= Insubordinate movement in Spain =

Antimilitarist movement in Spain

Broken rifle, main symbol of the War Resisters' International.

The Insubordinate movement (Spanish: movimiento insumiso or insumisión, Catalan: moviment d'insubmissió, Galician: movemento insubmiso, Basque: intsumisio mugimendua) was a mass antimilitarist movement of civil disobedience to compulsory military service in Spain, the movement lasting from the early 1970s until the abolition of conscription on 31 December 2001.

== History ==
The immediate predecessor of insubordination was the movement of conscientious objectors initiated in the last years of the Francoist regime, a movement seeking legal recognition of the right not to perform the, then, compulsory military service on conscience or moral grounds. Conscientious objectors, therefore, refused to join the Spanish Armed Forces, but were nevertheless prosecuted and tried by it, and in many cases ended up in military prisons.

In 1984, the Congreso de los Diputados passed a law on conscientious objection, which recognised the rights of objectors, establishing an alternative civilian service of 18 months, called "Prestación Social Sustitutoria" (Substitutionary Social Service, PSS), as an alternative to 12 months compulsory military service. The previous objectors were then amnestied and freed from military obligations. A few of them, however, considered that the longer duration of the PSS penalised objectors, amounted to forced labour, and deprived ordinary workers of their jobs; they demanded complete abolition of military service. Those objectors therefore rejected the amnesty and returned to Spain apparently ready to be called up.

When the army tried to enlist them again, the so-called "Insumisos" (insubordinates) refused to join either the army or the PSS. By doing so they committed a crime and were tried again, but the existence of a largely unfavourable public opinion to compulsory military service made the judicial proceedings, especially when the penalty included imprisonment, a considerable political cost for the government.

Refusal to perform military service was punishable under the military penal code, and was part of the jurisdiction of the army, with a minimum penalty of a year in jail. Refusal to perform PSS was punished by the ordinary penal code, with two years, four months and one day in prison.

In subsequent years the number of young people refusing to join the army or, once recognised as conscientious objectors, refused to perform PSS, exponentially increased. If repression of the "insumisos" was difficult, given the broad social support that they had, it was even more difficult when undertaken by the military courts, because the military courts were denounced by antimilitarists as "judge and jury" in the army's own cause, and because the accused were not part of the army, but remained civilians. Also, the adjudication of civilians by military courts and sending them to prison evoked for many the Franco era. Thus, the army asked the government to release it from the task of repressing the insubordination movement, which was finally agreed by the government. From then the "insumisos" were tried by ordinary courts. Despite this, in the first years the ordinary courts continued applying military law. Later the ordinary courts judged the "insumisos" by applying a reformed version of the ordinary penal code that included the crime of refusing to perform military service, with an increased penalty to equate it to that applied for refusing to do PSS.

The Insubordination was a grassroots, nonpartisan and decentralised movement. Despite the nonpartisan character it was supported by several left-wing parties, like the United Left, Herri Batasuna, Republican Left of Catalonia, Galician Nationalist Bloc, Auzolan, Popular Unity Candidates, Socialist Party of Mallorca, Galician Socialist Party-Galician Left, Valencian Nationalist Bloc, Unitarian Candidacy of Workers, Communist Movement, LCR and many others. In all the major cities there were assemblies of "insumisos", co-ordinated with each other in different antimilitarist fora. The most important groups were the Conscientious Objection Movement (MOC), close to the ideas of nonviolence, and a constellation of groups generically called Mili KK, more linked to the extra-parliamentary left, although the dividing lines were never totally clear. Anarchist groups also played an important role in the antimilitarist struggle, promoting most of them total disobedience tactics (such as the CNT, CGT and FIJL organisations). In the late 1980s and the 1990s many antimilitaristic, magazines and groups appeared. On the eve of the disappearance of compulsory military service the number of "insumisos" exceeded the tens of thousands, probably more than the number of "no-insumisos".

Insubordination was mostly a purely antimilitarist movement. There were also, however, people who joined the insubordination for other reasons, especially, in more recent times, people favouring a professional army. One of the most important components of the insubordination movement were the Basque, Catalan, Galician or Canarian nationalists, not necessarily anti-militarist, although the majority were also strong antimilitarists and antiimperialists; that especially applied to the Galicians and Canarians, who denounced the presence of any military force in their respective territories, and routinely protested against them. The Basque Abertzale left also considered the Spanish army an occupation force in the Southern Basque Country, and campaigned for full withdrawal of any Spanish army from Euskadi; who refused to serve in a "Spanish" army. Another reason for insubordination was the popular perception of the Spanish army as a fascist and/or francoist institution, a perception renewed by the various coup attempts in the 1980s, like the 23F in 1981 or the 2J conspiracy in 1985. Some people also opposed military service on religious grounds, such as the Jehovah's Witnesses or some pacifist Christians.

== Tactics and strategy ==
Regarding the strategy to follow in civil disobedience, there were also different viewpoints:

- Some "insumisos" chose not to avoid prison, considering that the existence of prisoners of conscience favoured the objectives of the movement due to the high political cost to the government of having objectors in prison.
- Another group, on the other hand, sought to avoid prison through an elaborate legal defence, as they felt that freedom (interim or final) was a small victory and that imprisonment could discourage young people of military age to join the movement.
- A third group (sometimes known as the "invisibles") also declared insubordination to the courts, and did not go to their own trials, and did not accept orders to report to prison. They survived by hiding, at least until they were located and arrested. Many, however, managed to remain free until the total disappearance of conscription. This strategy was advocated and practised by the Colectivo Antimilitarista Pro-Insumisión (Pro-insubordinatio Antimilitarist Collective, CAMPI), that rejected the right of any court to judge the legitimacy of their ideas, and on the other hand considered the PSS an arbitrary punishment that provided the state with a free and forced workforce, removing employment opportunities to qualified persons for those functions. This group was active in many cities. The majority of anarchists also followed this tactic.

Those who could not be "insumisos" (for example, men who had already completed military service or women) put up initiatives of "self-incrimination": based on the legal principle that whoever incites someone to commit an offence is also guilty, they signed statements accusing themselves of promoting insubordination. Self-incriminations were generally not accepted by the courts. Many people used self-incriminations to establish an active link with the insubordinate movement, among them prominent intellectuals, politicians, filmmakers, singers, actors and other personalities and celebrities.

The Spanish insubordinate movement was a civil disobedience movement unparalleled in any other European country, its closest precedent in the Western world being the disobedience and insubordination to the Vietnam War in the United States. Attempts to do something similar in other countries, such as Germany and France, failed due to the lack of a social base and popular support. The success of insubordination in Spain has been attributed to an antimilitarist sentiment supposedly rooted in the Spanish society and linked both to the resistance against conscription during the Carlist Wars and during the Rif War between 1909 and 1927, and even some have tried to establish a relationship of this movement to the wide diffusion of anarchism in Spain (a minor phenomenon elsewhere), specially in the first decades of the twentieth century.

Insubordination was one of the main causes of the reduction of military service from 12 to 9 months and, later, of its total abolition. The other main cause was the 1996 pact between the People's Party and the Basque Nationalist Party and Convergence and Union in 1996, that included the disappearance of military service in 2001.

== Chronology of the movement ==
1937

- Antonio Gargallo Mejía executed at Jaca by the Francoists on 18 August 1937 for refusing to join the 17th Regiment. He was a member of the Jehovah's Witnesses.

1960–1970

- Hundreds of "Jehovah's Witnesses" remain in prison, with sentences of more than ten years, for refusing compulsory military service. In the castle of San Fernando (Cádiz) over 200 conscientious objectors served long sentences, almost all members of Jehovah's Witnesses.
- Large number of new sentences against Jehovah's Witnesses.
- First camps of nonviolence.

1970

- First attempt, unsuccessful, to legislate the right to conscientious objection in the Cortes Españolas (Francoist pseudo-parliament).

1971

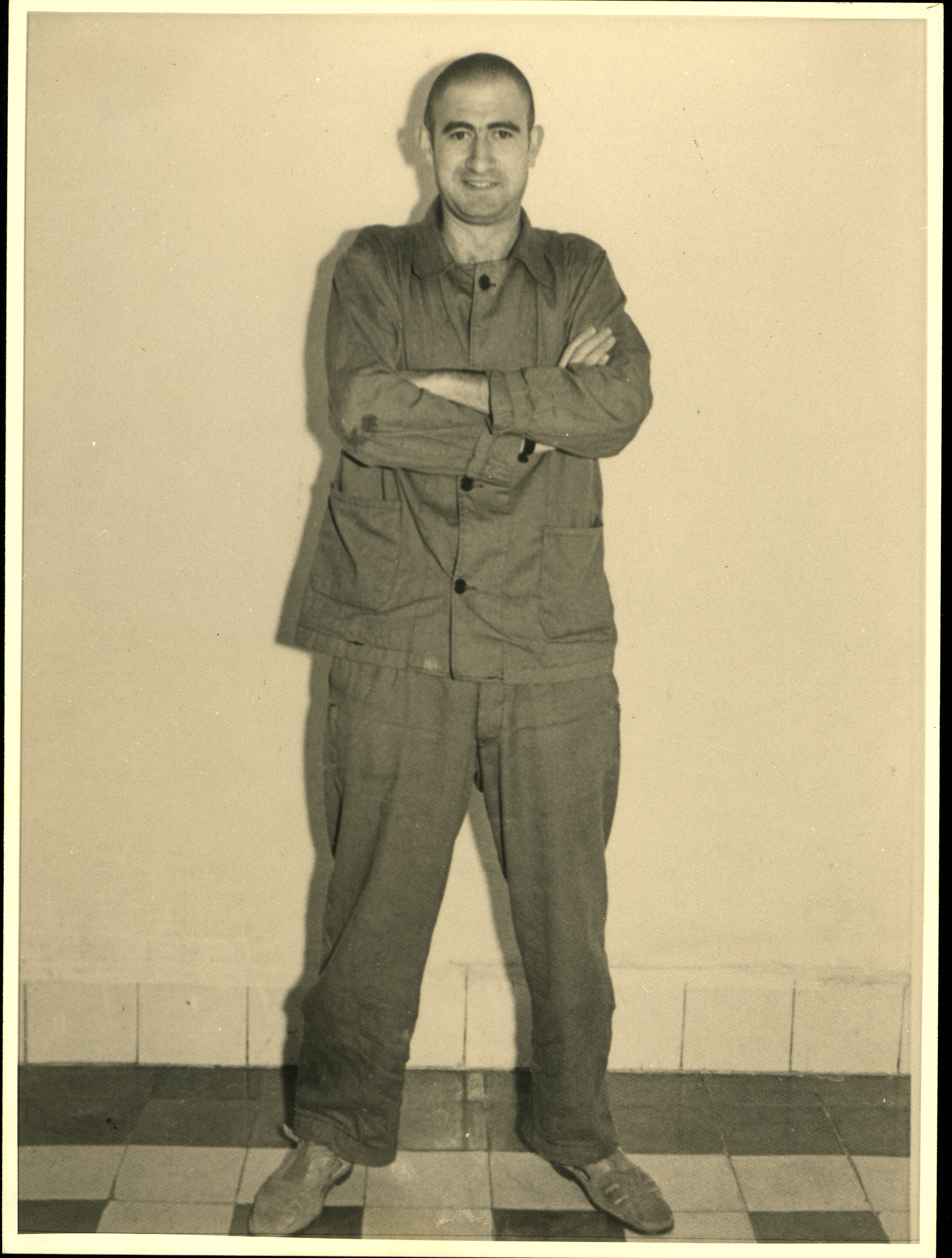
Pepe Beunza in prison at Jaén.

- The government withdraws proposed Conscientious objection law, after being rejected by the Cortes Españolas and the Spanish army.
- Detention of Pepe Beunza and trial in Valencia.
- International campaign to support Pepe Beunza: march from Geneva to the prison of Valencia.
- Other "objectionists" follow the steps of Pepe Beunza and use the same tactics.

1972

- Cristóbal Halffter composes "Gaudium et Spes" honouring Pepe Beunza.

1974

- Gonzalo Arias and Pepe Beunza promote "Voluntary Service for Development".

1975

- First organised groups of objectors.
- Project of "Voluntary Service for Development", as an alternative to military service, is presented. Receives more than 1,250 signatures of people willing to do it.
- "Self-managed civilian service" projects are launched, including Can Serra (L'Hospitalet de Llobregat). Later, similar groups appear in Bilbao, Madrid, Málaga, Tarragona, Vic and València.

1976

- There are 285 objectors jailed.

1977

- The defence minister, Manuel Gutiérrez Mellado, issues the order of "postponed incorporation" for some objectors.
- The Amnesty Law frees both political prisoners and objectors.
- The Conscientious Objection Movement (MOC) is founded, with the goal of co-ordinating the different objector groups.
- A proposed law allowing conscientious objection on religious grounds is rejected by the Congreso de los Diputados

1978

- The 1978 Constitution, designates the Spanish army the "guarantor of territorial integrity of the state" and stipulates that "the law shall determine the military obligations, conscientious objection and other exemptions from the compulsory military service, it may impose an alternative social service".

1979

- Congress of the MOC at Landa (Álava): first ideological declaration of the Spanish antimilitarist movement.

1980

- Arrests of objectors accused of insulting the army: multitude of support actions all over Spain.
- Gira de contactos internacionales del MOC.

1981

- Failed coup. This, and other military conspiracies, turn public opinion even more against the army.
- Spain joins NATO.

1982

- The PSOE wins the general elections.
- FACA program, acquisition of F-14 warplanes.
- The Andalusian Assembly of Nonviolence calls for tax resistance against military spending.
- International nonviolent march for demilitarisation in La Linea, Andalusia, and Gibraltar. Fifteen nonviolent activists from different countries climb over the closed Spanish gate from Gibraltar into Spain; thirteen of them are taken under heavily armed guard the whole length of Spain to Port Bou, and deported to France.

1983

- Project of the Conscientious objection Law.
- The MOC announces that it will not comply with the law.

1984

- Assembly of Vallvidrera (Barcelona): a collective objection campaign is planned.
- Founding of MiliKK in Catalonia.
- 28 December: the Conscientious Objection Law is approved.

1985

- Petitions of unconstitutionality against the Conscientious Objection Law.
- Campaign of "collective objection".
- The CNOC accepts about 15,000 collective declarations.
- Final draft of Regulation concerning the PSS.
- Foundation of the Association of Conscientious Objectors (AOC).

1986

- Referendum on permanence of Spain in NATO; broad social mobilisation for NO; despite this, YES to NATO wins.
- Second congress of the MOC.

1987

- The Constitutional Court dismisses the constitutional complaint on the Conscientious Objection Law.
- The Human Rights Association granted their annual award to the conscientious objection movement.
- The MOC defines its lines of action against the PSS: disobedience and total insubordination and boycotting the entities that collaborate with the implementation of the PSS.

1988

- First year of the PSS.
- The CNOC (National Council of Conscientious Objection) begins to reject collective conscientious objection statements.
- Objectionist groups prepare a civil disobedience campaign to the Conscientious Objection Law.
- Amnesty International recognises Joseph M. Fierro, objector, as a "prisoner of conscience".
- Legislative Decree on the incorporation of women into the army. The first women enter the Spanish Army.

1989

- First collective presentations of "insumisos", that were both against military service and the PSS.
- Covert amnesty: most objectors go to the reservation in "deferred integration".
- 43 objectors begin to fulfill the PSS.
- Enrique Múgica Herzog, Minister of Justice accuses the "insumisos" of "using conscientious objection to destabilize the democratic state and of being supported by radical and violent elements" and warns them that "all the weight of the law" would fall upon them.
- Manifesto for the abolition of conscription and first wave of collective self-incriminations.
- Trial of the first two "insumisos" of MiliKK, sentenced to 13 months in prison.
- The first national congress of "objection to military spending" is celebrated in Madrid.
- This year the 5.49% of the people called to join the military service declare themselves "insumisos", refusing also to do the PSS.

1990

- 386 objectors fulfill the PSS.
- 2,450 "insumisos" that year; 130 of them are jailed.

1991

- Trial of several "insumisos" to the PSS in Albacete.
- First sentences of 2 years, 4 months and 1 day (new maximum sentence)
- Gulf War: several recruits serving in the Spanish frigates that were to be sent to the war desert. Amnesty International recognizes them as "prisoners of conscience".
- Hunger strike of both "insumisos" and deserters in the military prison of Alcalá de Henares.
- Sharp increase in conscientious objection.
- The Ministry of Defence declares that "there isn't a general feeling against conscription, but some social sectors contrary to the concepts of sacrifice and solidarity".
- Military Service Law amended: the cases of insubordination will now be judged by the civil jurisdiction. Penalties were increased to 28 months.

1992

- 107 trials are held against the "insumisos".
- The Progressive Union of Prosecutors publicly criticized the statement of the Attorney General of the State, requesting the imprisonment of the "insumisos".
- First sentences absolving "insumisos", the majority in Barcelona.
- 42.454 applications for the PSS, a 51% more than the previous year.
- The 19.87% of the people called to join the military service declare themselves "insumisos", refusing also to do the PSS.
- 56% of the Navarrese youth called to the military service or the PSS joins the insubordinate movement, rejecting both.
- Campaign or all or none denounces the selective repression.
- Spanish troops are sent to Bosnia-Herzegovina: UNPROFOR.

1993

- The Basque and Catalan parliaments approve motions in favor of the total decriminalization of insubordination.
- Amending of the Prison Regulations: the "insumisos" will have more favourable prison conditions.
- Start of the campaign of disobedience to the new prison conditions: the plante.

1994

- A confidential report of the CESID about the antimilitarist movement was leaked to the press. The secret services have been monitoring it. This puts public opinion even more in favour of the movement.
- Objectors serving in Bosnia-Herzegovina report their instrumentalization against the movement and sign a letter of support for the "insumisos".
- PSS Special plan: subsidies are given to private entities that accept objectionists.
- Juan Alberto Belloch, minister of Justice, publicly recognizes that the growth of insubordination is a "state problem".
- 188 insumisos are serving sentences in prison.
- The "plantes" continue.
- Limited hunger strike of 46 insubordinate prisoners at the prison of Pamplona. Dispersion of 8 of them.

1995

- The new penal code was adopted. The "insumisos" will now be "disqualified", although jail still remains as a possible punishment for them.

1996

- Enters into force the new penal code.
- The association of pro-insubordinate municipalities EUDIMA is created in the Basque Country . EUDIMA tries to prevent young people from their municipalities from being forcibly recruited by the army.
- There are 348 "insumisos" at prison.
- The Defence Ministry revealed that only one in five objectors makes the PSS.
- The People's Party wins the elections and announces the full professionalization of the Armed Forces in 2003.

1997

- Defence invests 2 billion of Pesetas in an intense image and recruiting campaign for the new professional army.
- The MOC starts the "Disobedience in the barracks" campaign: first appearances of "insumisos-deserters".
- The universities of the Basque Country and Aragón, the municipality of San Sebastián, and the municipalities and administrations governed by the Basque Nationalist Party, Eusko Alkartasuna, United Left and Herri Batasuna refuse to expel the "insumisos".
- First trials and imprisonments of insumisos-deserters. The sentences are 2 years and 4 months in a military prison.
- "Tonto el último" operation: present about 130,000 applications for conscientious objection, an historical record.
- The "insumiso" Enrique Mur dies in the jail of Zaragoza. The Collective of Insubordinate Prisoners denounces poor healthcare.

1998

- Judicial processes opened to more than 40 antimilitarist actions, specially for occupying military installations.
- Reform of the criminal code: the minimum period of disqualification for the insubordinates is reduced to four years.
- Pardons to jailed "insumisos".
- March to the Alcalá de Henares military prison.
- Professional recruitment figures fall, below three candidates per seat.
- Takes effect, retroactively, the new Conscientious objector Law. The new law equals the length of compulsory military service and the PSS, and passes to the reserve to thousands of objectors on hold. The number of outstanding extension exceeds one million people.

1999

- The Spanish army participates in the NATO bombing on Yugoslavia. New antimilitarist backlash of the war.
- New public presentations of insumisos-deserters.
- War councils to civilians for carrying out antimilitarist nonviolent actions at military installations.

2000

- 12 insumisos-deserters in the military prison of Alcalá de Henares.
- The José María Aznar government announces that the replacement leaving the barracks in December 2001 will be the last to perform the compulsory military service, two years before the previous planning.
- Last official conscription: festivities and antimilitarist actions in various parts of Spain.
- 460 "insumisos" partially pardoned by the government, no more people will go to jail for being against compulsory military service, the government announces. The disqualifications from holding public office are maintained for 4 years.

2001

- The People's Party prevents their votes in the Congreso de los Diputados the official decriminalization of insubordination.
- The last conscripts leave the barracks; only 5000 of 91,000 drawn have actually joined the army.
- There are 76,000 professional soldiers instead of the 102,000 expected in the plans of the Ministry of Defence.
- Seven insumisos-deserters remain in the military prison of Alcalá de Henares despite the disapparition of the compulsory military service.
- The MOC celebrates its III Congress.
- Demonstration in Alicante against the Day of the Armed Forces: 5000 protesters. Two antimilitarists of the Tortuga Group remaining 12 hours atop of a palm tree in the promenade where the parade was going to be celebrated.

2002

- All the crimes related with insubordination disappear from the penal code. Amnesty to about 4000 processed and to the 20 "insumisos" that remained in prison.

== Insubordination in popular music ==
One of the main ways of propaganda of the Insubordinate movement was music, mainly within the punk scene, but also in pop and pop rock, Metal, Ska and other scenes. Antimilitarist music was very popular among the youth during the campaign against Military Service. Some groups like Negu Gorriak even donated their profits to the movement. Among the most notable songs and hymns are:

- Cruzar los brazos (1986) Víctor Manuel
- Soldados (1984) Eskorbuto
- No al ejército (1984) IV Reich
- Morireis como Imbéciles (1985) La Polla Records
- Antimilitar (1986) RIP
- ¿El militar? ¿Qué militar? (1996) Los Muertos de Cristo
- ¿Qué voy a hacer yo? (1990) Celtas Cortos
- Mili KK (1991) and Rompan Filas (2001) Reincidentes
- Mili KK (1989) Legion
- Insubmís (1991) Lluís Llach
- Soldadito español (1992) El Último Ke Zierre
- Insumisión (1992) and Estado Militar (1989) Guerrilla Urbana
- Insumisión (1993) Kojón Prieto y los Huajolotes
- Deskontrol (1993) Piperrak
- Mili mierda (1993) Soziedad Alkoholika
- 20 años (1995) Saratoga
- Sargento Bolilla (1995) Ska-P
- Jodido Facha (1996) Hamlet
- Tod@s con la insumisión (1997) Síndrome de Abstinencia
- Mi amigo Mambrú (1998) Eskorzo
- Matxinada (1993) Exkixu

== See also ==
- Antimilitarism
- Conscientious objector
- Pacifism in Spain
- War resister

== Notes ==
- Several authors; En legítima desobediencia: Tres décadas de objeción, insumisión y antimilitarismo, Ed. Traficantes de Sueños, Madrid, 2002. (Authorized PDF version.)
- Carlos M. Beristain; La insumisión encarcelada. Virus editorial, 1992. Barcelona. ISBN 84-88455-00-3.
