= Basque Radical Rock =

Musical genre

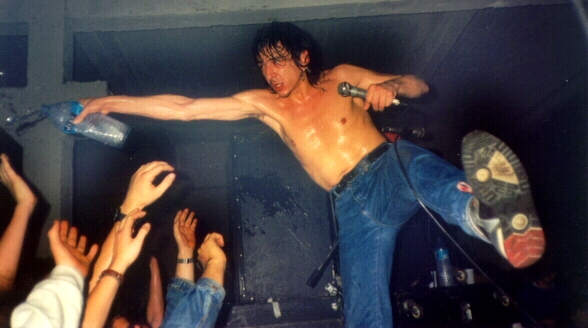
Evaristo, singer of La Polla Records (which means Dick Records in Spanish) at a concert.

Basque Radical Rock (Spanish: Rock radikal vasco (RRV), Basque: Euskal Herriko rock erradikala) was a musical genre born in the Southern Basque Country at the beginning of the 1980s and, although there was no specific event, it is considered to have ended in the last years of the decade. Basque Radical Rock bands were particularly influenced by punk bands like the Sex Pistols and the Clash. It was considered an underground movement, born in opposition to the values proclaimed by Francisco Franco and spread by thousands of people who felt with the Spanish transition to democracy their Basque national and social aspirations were betrayed.

The name Basque Radical Rock was first used in 1983 in an article published in the newspaper Egin signed by José Mari Blasco (ex manager of the band La Polla Records), after a music festival against Spain remaining in NATO. The concept of BRR was very controversial from the beginning. Despite sharing a progressive mindset, anti-system stance and often a Basque nationalist view, some bands felt manipulated and denied the label as they considered it commercial. The band Eskorbuto, for one, claimed that "rock does not have any fatherland".

All the bands showed a social and political criticism and a high number of the lyrics criticised organizations in power, such as the Spanish state, the police, the Spanish monarchy, the Roman Catholic Church, the military, the bullfights and the Guardia Civil. Together with independent radio stations, fanzines, squat houses and some alternative groups, the movement surrounding the leftist pro-independence political party Herri Batasuna backed the movement. Herri Batasuna began in a campaign called Martxa eta Borroka (Rhythm and Fight) organizing rock concerts combined with political rallies. This helped the bands spread their music in the whole Basque Country. Moreover, thanks to the contests organized by the newspaper Egin, many bands became more widely known, e.g. La Polla Records, Hertzainak, Potato, Kortatu, RIP, Barricada and Cicatriz.

== History ==
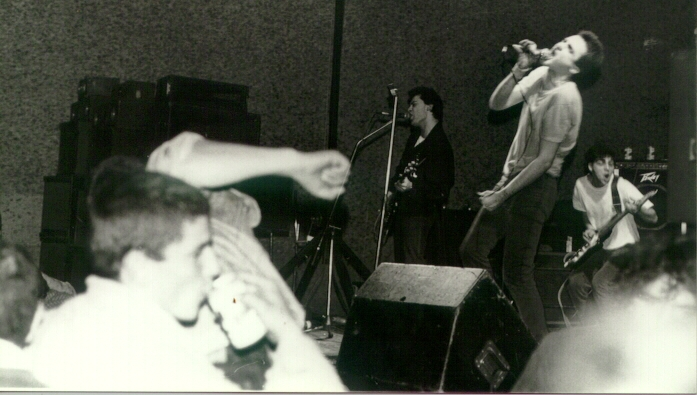
Zarama in Irun in 1986.

=== The birth of the movement ===
Before the invention of the label Basque Radical Rock, there were some minor radical bands in the Basque Country, but these had limited influence. In 1977 the first Basque punk-rock bands were created, mainly influenced by the rhythms coming from England. These bands spread across the Basque region and had limited resources. Linked to the punk philosophy that someone does not necessarily need to know an instrument to play it, more bands were quickly created. Odio (Hate), Basura (Trash), Vulpess, Optalidon, Cirrosis and RIP were some of the early bands, most of them hailing from industrial areas (Bilbao, Mondragon...).

In the mid-1980s, as the movement grew stronger, some bands began to stand out and pull together a keen following determined to boost the movement ahead. These bands included Hertzainak, La Polla Records, Zarama, MCD, Eskorbuto, Barricada, RIP, Kortatu, Vómito and BAP!! However, Basque Radical Rock hardly left an imprint in the Northern Basque Country, where the punk outlook didn't take hold and rock bands developed along the lines of a concern for Basque culture and cleaner sounds (Minxoriak, Niko Etxart, Errobi,...).

Approx. in 1987 the movement reached its peak when the compilation album Bat, bi, hiru... hamar was released by daily newspaper Egin, providing the springboard for many bands, who secured a wide audience. However, it was heralding by then the decline of the movement, gradually losing initial cohesion provided by rage and a common social outlook, diversifying and taking more individual paths. Softer tunes started to find a slot in the Basque society's taste and some BRR flagship bands were hard hit by drugs and AIDS, such as Cicatriz, RIP or Eskorbuto, while others decided to put an end to their course (Kortatu, last live album Azken guda dantza in 1988).

=== Campaigns and contests ===
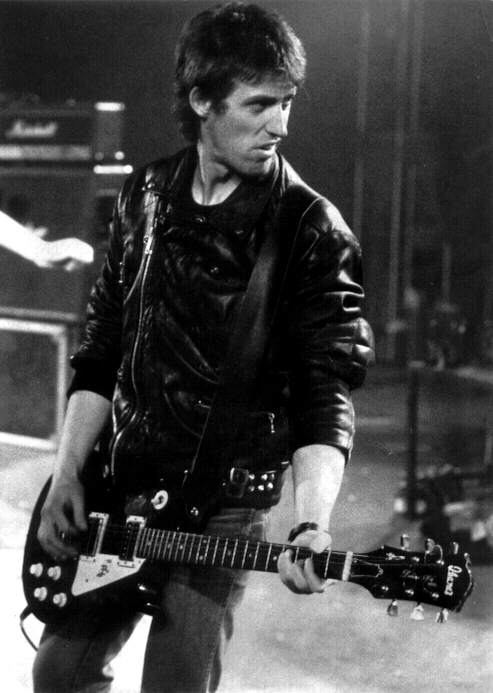
Member of RIP, Jul (1986).

The newspaper Egin, and especially the journalist Pablo Cabeza, had a big influence on spreading the BRR. The promoters of the movement used the music section of the newspaper to promote these bands' names and their philosophy. They also organized a competition (Egin Rock Txapelketa) to choose which were their readers' favourite bands. The final of the competition was held in the football stadium of Gasteiz and thousands of punk fans turned out. The bands receiving most votes in each Basque Spanish province were performing, namely RIP (from Gipuzkoa), Hertzainak (from Álava), Barricada (from Navarre) and Zarama (from Biscay).

Another important step in spreading the movement was the campaign Martxa eta borroka (Rhythm and Fight) waged by the leftist pro-independence political party Herri Batasuna beginning in 1985. In this campaign political rallies were interspersed by concerts by BRR (RRV) bands. Despite some bands refusing to join the campaign, the initiative was very successful, allowing Herri Batasuna to correct the initial reaction people may have had against punk and rock music, linking it with drugs and the loss of the Basque awareness, and the BRR movement continued along these political lines.

The gaining of social support and the increasing number of concerts had a big impact in a short period of time, and the movement that was initially marginal and supported by few people became common ground for thousands of Basque people. Many concerts were linked to the Basque National Liberation Movement, so many were supporting ETA prisoners, Nicaragua, ikastolas or Basque language schools, anti-nuclear movements, local squat houses or free radio, or against militarism, fascism, racism and sexism.

Musically it was not a homogeneous movement. Different musical styles were played under the RRV banner. For example, Barricada played rock, Kortatu and Hertzainak ska and punk, Potato played reggae, Vomito dark rock, while La Polla Records and Cicatriz played punk-rock. It was the attitude rather the music that linked all these groups.

The movement became known outside the Basque Country. Many groups, particularly those who sang in Spanish, played concerts in Europe or South America. Nevertheless, bands singing in Basque like Kortatu, Hertzainak and Jotakie, played in Germany, the Netherlands, Italy and France. In particular the festival held in Barcelona (Catalonia) in November 1985 under the name of Basque Rock, attracted more than 10,000 people to see RIP, Hertzainak (who did not play because of trouble with the Spanish police), La Polla Records, Kortatu and Cicatriz.

=== From Spanish to Basque ===
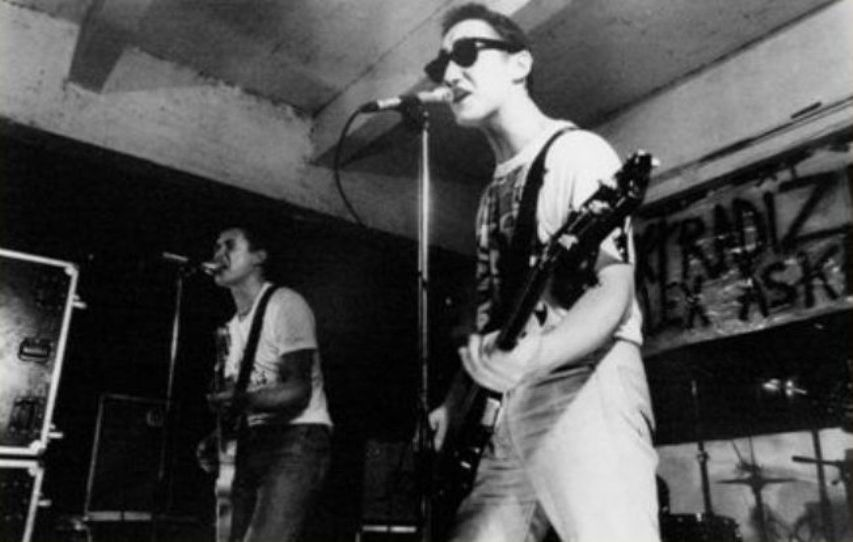
Iñigo Muguruza, member of Kortatu playing in Egia

Even though Spanish was the main language of the movement, some groups chose to sing in Basque, notably Hertzainak and Zarama. Despite the fact they came from very different areas, they both made the same decision, i.e. punk in the Basque Country had to be sung in Basque. The singers of both bands (Xabier Montoia of Hertzainak (who later would create M-ak) and Roberto Moso of Zarama) decided to learn the language.

Some groups switched from Spanish to Basque, notably Kortatu, who released their first album only in Spanish. They gradually added more songs in Basque, with their last album Kolpez kolpe featuring a Basque language only track list. Fermin Muguruza, the singer of the band, learnt the language and would later create other bands like Negu Gorriak with virtually all lyrics in Basque. Danba and BAP!! evolved along similar lines.

=== Independent record companies and the media ===
The consolidation of the movement is linked to the social-political reality of the Basque Country in the 80's. The massive birth of black and white fanzines, the network of free radio stations and the squatting movement had a big influence on spreading everything related to the BRR.

At the beginning of the decade of the 80s the first independent record companies were created: Soñua Oihuka, Discos Suicidas and Basati Diskak, while informal magazines reported on the bands recording their discs with these record labels.

Slowly the movement initially created in an underground environment of bands, recording studios and managers, became more professional. Record companies such as Elkar, IZ and Soñua opened recording studios and the first sound technicians, such as Jean Phocas, César Ibarretxe, Kaki Arkarazo and Angel Katarain, were trained there. The movement even created its own rock management agencies such as Matxitxa.

=== Legacy ===
As well as politics, there were other important influences on BRR, especially drugs. Hundreds of musicians and fans died of heroin. Many others who survived the addiction later discovered they had the AIDS virus, which was unknown at the time.

The music and attitudes of the period struck a chord in the whole Basque Country and are still important for many young people. BRR also had a rebirth when many younger bands released their first records inspired by bands such as La Polla Records, Hertzainak, Eskorbuto or RIP, instead of looking for references in the US or England. Some of these bands are Etsaiak, Soziedad Alkoholika, Negu Gorriak, Su Ta Gar, Berri Txarrak, Skalariak, Betagarri. Some other later bands from outside the Basque Country were influenced by the BRR, including Reincidentes, Boikot, Ska-P or Extremoduro in Spain, Banda Bassotti or Talco in Italy, and Mokoka in France.

There was no clear end to the movement, but it occurred at the beginning of the 1990s, as newer bands began to play in more sophisticated music styles. Nevertheless, the influence of the movement is still present in bands, bars, town festivals and popular movements after almost 20 years.

== The Basque Radical Rock in films ==
The documentary Salda Badago directed by Eriz Zapirain describes the beginning of the movement.

== Bands ==
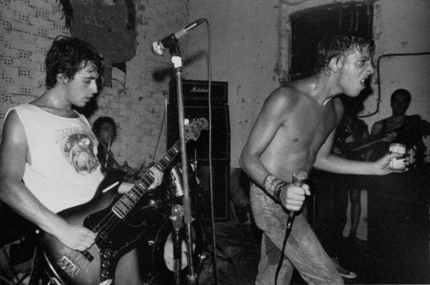
Cicatriz at a concert in the squat house of Hondarribia

- Anti-Régimen
- BAP!!
- Baldin Bada
- Barricada
- Basura
- Cicatriz
- Delirium Tremens
- Eskorbuto
- Hertzainak
- Jotakie
- Korroskada
- Kortatu
- La Polla Records
- Naste Borraste
- M.C.D.
- Odio
- Piperrak
- Potato
- RIP
- Tijuana in Blue
- Txorromorro
- Skalope
- Vómito
- Vulpess
- Zarama
- Zer Bizio?

== See also ==
- Basque music
