= Rebujas Rock =

- Genre: Rock
- Dates: September
- Locations: San Mateo, Cantabria
- Years active: 1997 – present
- Founders: S.C.D. Rebujas
- Website: www.rebujasrock.com

The Rebujas Rock is a Rock Music Festival held every September in the village of San Mateo, Cantabria, Spain.

== History ==
What began in 1997 as a small festival where local rock groups and groups of traditional music performed for no more than 600 people, is today a major national festival, that attracts more than 9,000 people while maintaining its original identity including free admission and free camping. There is no profit motive, and it is organised by the S.C.D. Rebujas.

Since 2002 the Rebujas Rock is held in memory of Gabriel Gutierrez Laguillo. The year 2009, as the big news came to light a tribute song to the Festival; "Que No Amanezca", which have worked in the major rock groups throughout the state. Besides being an indelible anthem, serves as an important tool to defend and claim the status of San Mateo as the People to avoid extinction. It is the first musical work that is published throughout the long history of people and leaving fruit to the work of the SCD Rebujas.

== Posters ==
- 1997. The Humera - Atlantica
- 1998. La Fuga - The Humera - Karonte - Entramborrios - Mordor
- 1999. La Fuga - Desastre - The Burla - Entraborrios
- 2000. Porretas - Desastre - Entramborrios
- 2001. Marea - Canallas - Vantroi - Los Perezosos - Desastre
- 2002. El Ultimo k Zierre - Silencio Absoluto - Desastre - Apuraos - The Birras - Silencio Absoluto - YaSonSEIS
- 2003. Rata Blanca - Ars Amandi - Possesiön - Desastre- Mala Reputaticion - Conocimento Zero
- 2004. Reincidentes - Sublevados - Forrage - Propaganda - Amusia
- 2005. Sugarless - Porretas - Desastre - Los Nadie - Sin KoncienZia
- 2006. Hamlet - Boikot - Estrago - Ars Amandi - Propaganda
- 2007. Los Suaves - Kaotiko - PonchoK - Eslabon - Blind Dogs
- 2008. Barricada - Koma - Desastre- Kloakao
- 2009. Rosendo - Fe De Ratas - Desastre - King Size Co.
- 2010. Soziedad Alkoholika - Lendakaris Muertos - Hora Zulu - Desastre - A-Tono
- 2011. Txarrena - Gatillazo - Bocanada - Desastre - De Entramborrios
- 2012. Koma - Hora Zulu - Obrint Pas - Desastre - Benito Kamelas - Emboque
- 2013. El Drogas - Kaotiko - Skunk D.F. - Desastre - A.R.D.E.N - Yelko
- 2014. Boikot - Obus - Segismundo Toxicomano - Vita Imana - Desastre - Karne Cruda
