= Cicatriz =

Basque punk band

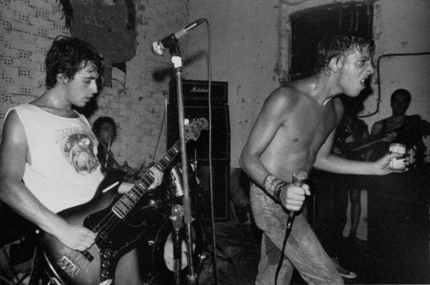
- Cicatriz at a concert, in Fuenterrabía.

Background information
- Origin: Vitoria, Basque Autonomous Community, Spain
- Genres: Punk rock Hard rock Heavy metal
- Years active: 1983–1995
- Labels: Oihuka; Zika Records
- Past members: Natxo Etxebarrieta†; Goar Iñurrieta; Pakito Rodrigo†; Pedro Landatxe†; La Poti; Manolo; El Pescadilla; Diego "Dieguillo" Garay; Pedro Fernández Iradier; José "Pepin" Arteaga†; Pedro Landatxe

Cicatriz was a punk rock band from the Basque Autonomous Community (Spain) formed in 1983. The band was significant within the Basque Radical Rock (Rock Radical Vasco or RRV) movement.

Best known for albums such as Inaptados (1986), the band reached a huge degree of influence in Spanish punk, alongside other bands like La Polla Records, Kortatu and Eskorbuto, which rose to fame in the 80's underground scene.

== Overview ==
=== 1983–1986: Origins, early days and Inadaptados ===
The band was formed in 1983 as group therapy in a Rehabilitation Center in Las Nieves, Vitoria. The first name was "Cicatriz en la Matriz", which included Natxo Etxebarrieta and his girlfriend Poti, together with Pescadilla on bass, Pedro Landatxe on the drums and Pepin Arteaga on guitar. The group is consolidated with Natxo and Poti as the singers, and this line-up recorded a demo in Pamplona, in 1984, with the songs "Botes de humo" (Tear gas), "Cuidado burócratas" (Beware, bureaucrats) and "Aprieta el gatillo" (Pull the trigger). That same year, Poti left the band.

In 1985, the band renamed simply as Cicatriz, recording with the label Soñua a shared album with Kortatu, Jotakie and Kontuz-Hi! Cicatriz contributed with three songs "Escupe" (Spit), "Cuidado burócratas" and "Enemigo Público" (Public enemy, second version of "Aprieta el gatillo"). The band began to be well known in the Basque Country for its in-your-face attitude, live provocative manners and no-holds-barred lyrics.

By 1986, the band released its first LP Inadaptados ("Misfits"), recorded at Elkar (Lasarte) Studios, with Jean Phocas as engineer and Josu Zabala (leader of Hertzainak) as producer. The album is considered one of the most important Spanish-language punk scene piece. That year, Cicatriz were voted "best live band" by the readers of the Basque newspaper Egin.

=== 1987–1990: New sound on the band and Natxo's arrest and accident ===
In 1987, Pepin Arteaga was fired from the band due to his heroine addiction. His replacement was Goar Iñurrieta (member from the hard rock bands Bizkar Hezurra and Korroskada) and continued performing shows to 1988, where Natxo is arrested in Barajas, on charges of drug traffic from the Netherlands, to find a package of amphetamine pills in his luggage. Natxo was tried and sentenced to four years in jail for illegal possession of drugs, although his friends and close people paid bail to release him after two months in prison. Also, that same year, Natxo suffered a near-fatal car accident in San Sebastián, where he was hospitalized in Valencia, after being rejected by two previous clinics, due to his condition of hepatitis. After one week, having had surgery on the back, he lost part of his legs driving mobility.

=== 1991–1996: Second album, struggles and the end of the band ===
After a while, Tati Jimenez (Natxo's mother) sued the driver who's car collided with her son and after a long trial, she attained a monetary compensation of 70.000.000 of spanish pesetas for the damage caused. Soon, Natxo decided to fund his own label and travel to London with his band to record the second album, 4 años, 2 meses y 1 día, released in 1991, produced by the band and Peter Peck.

In 1992, Natxo suffered from depression due to their health problems, and the rest of Cicatriz began to prepare a new album without a singer, although once finished with the tracks, Natxo participated and the LP was completed. By 1994, Natxo, Pakito and Pedro revealed that they had AIDS, and Pakito was the first to die from this disease in July of that same year. Then, Natxo and Goar continued with the group with Diego "Dieguillo" Garay (former Quemando Ruedas bass guitar) and Pedro Fernández Iradier (Rock DAM drummer) as replacements, recording the live album En Directo.

By 1995, Pedro Landatxe, who had left the group due to health issues, died from HIV complications. A few months after, on January 5th 1996, Natxo Etxebarrieta died from the same disease. After that, the band dissolved.

== Music style and legacy ==
Although labeled from the beginning as a radical Basque rock group, Cicatriz adopted hard rock and heavy metal elements, adding these to its own sound, along with a punk attitude. Although the band recorded only three studio albums, and one "live in concert" album, it has a "cult" following in far-flung parts of the world.

== Members ==
Core Members

- Natxo Etxebarrieta† – Lead Vocals (1984–1996).
- Goar Iñurrieta - Lead Guitar (1987–1996).
- Pakito Rodrigo† - Bass guitar (1984–1994).
- Pedro Landatxe† - Drums (1984–1995).

Other Members

- José "Pepin" Arteaga† - Lead Guitar (1984-1987).
- La Poti – Lead Vocals (1983–1984).
- Manolo - Drums (1983).
- El Pescadilla - Bass guitar (1983).
- Diego "Dieguillo" Garay - Bass guitar (1994–1996).
- Pedro Fernández Iradier - Drums (1994–1996).

== Discography ==
=== EP's ===
- Kortatu Cicatriz Jotakie Kontuz Hi! (Soñua, 1985) Maxi-EP shared with Kortatu, Jotakie and Kontuz-Hi!.

=== Studio albums ===
- Inadaptados (1986)
- 4 años, 2 meses y 1 día (1991)
- Colgado por ti (1992)

=== Live albums ===
- En Directo (1994)
