= BAP (Basque band) =

B.A.P.!! was a Basque-language hardcore punk from Andoain, Basque Autonomous Community, Spain, formed in 1984. The band's name BAP had various explanations including; Babarruna ta Aza Popularra!! (Basque for "Popular Beans and Cabbage"), and Brigada Anti Policial (Spanish for "Anti-Police Brigade"). The name was soon shortened to just B.A.P.!!, and cited as BAP.

== Discography ==
Their discography is limited to the Basque musical scene:

- Bidehuts eta etxehuts (Empty way and empty home). 1988, Basati Diskak.
- Zuria Beltzez (White in black). 1992, Basati Diskak.
- Lehertzeko garaia (Time to explode). 1994, Esan Ozenki.

After their dissolution in the mid 90s, their members have eventually participated in other musical projects such as Negu Gorriak, DUT and Inoren Ero Ni.

== See also ==
- Basque music
- Basque Radical Rock
