= Iosu Expósito =

Spanish punk rock musician

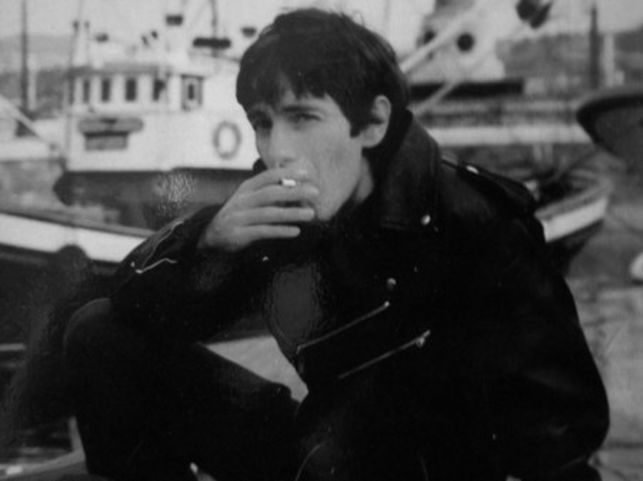

Background information
- Also known as: Iosu
- Born: Jesús María Expósito López; 23 December 1960; Santurce, Vizcaya
- Died: 31 May 1992 (aged 31) Baracaldo
- Genres: Punk rock; Alternative rock; hardcore punk
- Instruments: Vocals; guitar; bass guitar
- Years active: 1977–1992

Jesús María Expósito López (Santurce, Vizcaya, 23 December 1960 – Baracaldo, 31 May 1992) better known by his nickname Iosu was a Spanish rock musician, known as the guitarist from the punk rock band Eskorbuto.

== Career ==
Iosu Expósito was the guitarist and second singer of Eskorbuto from 1980 to early 1992. Iosu lived his entire life in the city of Santurce (Basque Country). During his childhood enjoyed listening to The Kinks, The Rolling Stones, The Who and then The Clash and Sex Pistols, also he was a great fan of football soccer. Expósito was part of the rock band Zarama as bass player between 1977 and 1979. In the late 1970s, Expósito worked in a factory at the Santurce harbour. He wrote about the experience in his song, "Cualquier Lugar" (Anywhere). In 1980 formed Eskorbuto with Juanma Suárez and Pako Galán. Iosu would be the band's principal songwriter with occasional contributions from Juanma Suárez. In early 1991, he left the band due to health problems and was absent from the Eskorbuto Mexico Tour, replaced by Iñaki "Gato". After three weeks, Expósito rejoined to the band, recording Demasiados enemigos... in 1991.

== Death ==
In 1991, Iosu began a treatment to quit heroin, as he had become very weak after years of addiction. On 31 May 1992, Iosu died of AIDS-related pneumonia, at the Hospital de Cruces in Baracaldo.

== Discography with Eskorbuto ==
Studio Albums

- Zona Especial Norte EP (1984)
- Eskizofrenia (1985)
- Anti Todo (1986)
- Ya No Quedan Más Cojones, Eskorbuto A Las Elecciones EP (1986)
- Los demenciales chicos acelerados (1987)
- Las mas macabras de las vidas (1988)
- Demasiados enemigos... (1991)

Live Albums

- Impuesto revolucionario (1986)
- La Otro Cara Del Rock, Live at Villarreal Castellón (2004)
- Sin fronteras, ni gobiernos (Recorded on 10 April 1987) (2007)

Demos

- Jodiéndolo todo (1983)
- Primeros ensayos 1982 (1992)
- Que Corra La Sangre: Segunda Maketa (1998)

Singles

- "Mucha Policia, Poca Diversión" (1983)
- "Eskorbuto Al Parlamento" (1986)
- "Adios Reina Mía" (1992)
