= Eskorbuto =

Spanish punk rock band

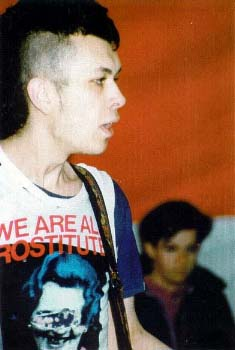
- Juanma Suárez, Bassist and Lead Vocalist from the band

Background information
- Origin: Santurtzi, Vizcaya, Spain
- Genres: Punk rock; hardcore punk; alternative rock
- Years active: 1980–1999
- Labels: Spansuls; Dro; Discos Suicidas; Buto eskor; Oihuka
- Past members: Iosu Expósito; Juanma Suárez; Pako Galán; Urko Igartiburu; Miguel; Iñaki "Gato"; Garlopa; Sergio Kalaña; Ali Kalaña; Kañas; Layky

Eskorbuto was a Spanish punk rock band from Santurtzi, Greater Bilbao, Basque Autonomous Community, that formed in 1980. They are considered to be one of the most influential bands for Spanish and Latin American punk rock.

Shortly after their formation, they became associated with the newly coined genre known as “Basque radical rock.” Subsequent public statements by the band expressed their rejection of this classification, asserting the group’s musical independence and unique identity.

They were known for their attitude and crass lyrics. They were one of the first bands to perform punk with lyrics in Spanish. Eskorbuto is a modified word taken from escorbuto (scurvy in Spanish).

Along with the band La Polla Records, Eskorbuto were very influential in the Spanish rock and punk scene.

In 2015, Pako Galán announced that he would be performing the band's discography solo. In May 2016, the backing line-up was announced, with Ali Kalaña performing bass and lead vocals, and Naty Penadas performing guitar and backing vocals. Pako was the only original member. He toured under the name "Pako Eskorbuto".

In 2025, former Eskorbuto member Sergio Kalaña performed some of Eskorbuto's songs during a tour of Chile and other Latin American countries with a group of Chilean musicians. He performed under the name "Sergio Kalaña: La última voz de Eskorbuto" (roughly: Sergio Kalaña: The Final Voice of Eskorbuto). He performed these songs as a homage to Eskorbuto's legacy and for fans who never had the chance to see the band live in their countries.

== Biography ==
=== Formation and Early Years (1980–1982) ===
Eskorbuto began in Nervión, Santurtzi in 1980. Their primary influence was the increase in popularity of punk music in United Kingdom in the 1970's. The band’s name was decided in a bar, where various options were considered, in part by Roberto Moso, the lead singer of Zarama, who suggested “Eskorbuto” (Scurvy) because of their “sickly appearance and that eccentric image.” They liked the name immediately, especially since in Santurce—a town with a seafaring tradition—scurvy was a common disease. Eskorbuto’s original lineup included Jesús María Expósito López (also known as Iosu Expósito) on electric guitar. Expósito had been the bassist for the rock band Zarama; Juan Manuel Suárez Fernández (also known as Jualma) on vocals; Roberto Kañas (who was soon replaced by Gugu) on drums; and Layky on bass. In 1981, they played their first concert at a school in the San Juan neighborhood before an audience of children around ten years old.

During 1981 and 1982, Eskorbuto performed several times at small nightclubs, schools, and carnival events. In mid-1982, Layky and Gugu left the band. They were replaced by Jualma on bass and Pako Galán on drums. Galán already had professional musical training and had been a member of several bands during the 1970s, including Atlantic and Eskombro. Little by little, they began to gain recognition through word of mouth and various graffiti messages.

In August 1982, the band recorded their first demo in Madrid. They travelled in an old Fiat 124 that broke down in Burgos. The band considered burning it but ultimately sold it for 3000 pesetas. The trip paid off, however, as they were signed by the independent label Spansuls Records where they recorded their first single. At that time, the nascent punk movement in Spain primarily focused on humorous subjects and messing around. Eskorbuto decided instead they decided to write about taboo topics.

=== Zona Especial Norte and Eskizofrenia (1983–1985) ===
In 1983, during a trip to Madrid, Eskorbuto recorded their first album with Sardi: “Mucha policía, poca diversión,” a seven-minute single featuring the songs “Mucha policía, poca diversión,” “Enterrado vivo,” and “Mi Degeneración,” released on the Spansuls Record label. The single sold out in three months.

While in Madrid on August 2, 1983, the band took a path through a park to get to a friend’s house, where they planned record a demo in greater detail. As they left the park, they passed in front of a police station. Because of their "suspicious appearance," they were questioned by the police, who searched them until they found the recorded demo. They were arrested and charged with insulting the state due to the content of the song lyrics (with songs such as “E.T.A.,” “Spit on the Flag,” and “Damn Country (Spain)”), and the Anti-Terrorism Law was applied to them. During Eskorbuto’s 36-hour detention, they felt abandoned by certain sectors of the Basque Country, particularly the so-called “Abertzale left” and by Spanish amnesty groups. The attorney the band chose to defend them was Cristina Almeida. After their release, both the Spanish and Basque press did not hesitate to label Eskorbuto as "the most radical band," although the band members always rejected that title.

In 1984, they released their second album under Spansuls Records: a split album with the band RIP titled Zona Especial Norte, which included the song “A la mierda el País Vasco.” Due to poor distribution, the EP was discontinued quickly. During this time, Jose Mari Blasco coined the term Rock Radical Vasco (Basque Radical Rock) for the genre and established the Soñua label, which began recording the bands La Polla Records, Hertzainak, and Barricada. Soñua offered to help Eskorbuto record alongside other Basque radical rock artists, a choice that would have opened doors in the Basque Country. This would require them to move away from their previous genre and topics. Eslorbuto refused. This release, combined with their refusal to label themselves as “radical Basque rock” (They viewed this genre as an external label created to make money) created many problems when trying to perform in the Basque Country. In response they said, "rock has no country, not even the Basque." Specifically, the newspaper Egin, aligned with the Basque nationalist left, organized a boycott against the band to prevent them from giving concerts in the Basque Country. They were also accused of being traitors due to the song "A La Mierda El País Vasco."

After this, Eskorbuto were censured in some stations and newspapers, and people became increasingly reluctant to hire them to play in the Basque Country. In their exact words: "We play more in the rest of Spain than in Euskadi." However, they were never anti-Basques, they preferred to play on their land instead of traveling to faraway concerts. As Iosu said, "we never play A La Mierda El País Vasco in Spain, there we prefer to play Maldito País España".

In 1984, they decided to secure a contract to record their first full-length album, but several record labels refused to offer them any promotion. Eventually, Twins Producciones in Madrid (through Javi Lennon) offered to let them record a full album in Bilbao. In 1985, the album Eskizofrenia was released. The disc contained 18 tracks composed between 1980 and 1984. This release allowed new opportunities to perform outside the Basque Country, up to this point they had few chances to play in their home region. In addition, in 1985 they appeared on the TVE program La bola de cristal, performing “Os engañan.” In 1987, Eskizofrenia was reissued by Discos Suicidas with a different cover. The same year they staged a concert in Hernani, sharing the bill with La Polla Records and Cicatriz, who performed in the political campaign Martxa eta Borroka.

=== Anti-Todo and breakthrough success (1986) ===
In early 1986, they released their second album, Anti todo, recorded at Tsunami Studios and released by Discos Suicidas. The meaning of the title was to say that they were anti-everything, everyone is anti-everything, but they were not against everything. Recorded in just twenty-six hours, this album is considered by many to be one of the best punk albums ever made in Spain, as well as a classic.

The band attempted a direct recording on a tour called Bloody Christmas, but was unsuccessful. After some planning, the band tried again: the chosen location was the end of the assembly hall of a school in Santurce. The same year, they released a double live album titled Impuesto revolucionario, making Eskorbuto one of the first bands to release a live album in Spain, following in the footsteps of Máquina! En directo (1972), Leño en Directo (1981), and Barón al rojo vivo (1984). The band said on the matter, "We do a lot of records because we play a little bit, our albums are Live." The cover art included a caricature of the three members of Eskorbuto by Niko from MCD.

At the end of that same year, they released their second EP, Ya no quedan más cojones, Eskorbuto a las elecciones. Later they released a cassette which included a Fanzine. The cassette consisted of six tracks and was titled Ya No Quedan Más Cojones, Eskorbuto A Las Elecciones. Despite the CSS trying to censor it and refusing to make the tape due to the song "Escupe A La Bandera," the cassette was an incredible success and sold out quickly.

=== New sounds, successes and struggles (1987–1990) ===
In 1987, their third studio album and second double album, Los demenciales chicos acelerados, was released—originally on Discos Suicidas and, months later, on DRO Records. This album was characterized as Zarzuela Rock (punk rock opera). Aitor Amezaga played the keyboard on the album. The band sold the same master twice without notifying the record labels (on an exclusive basis), so the album went on sale twice within six months, and neither of the contracts associated with it were valid. Following the album’s release, the band rarely performed songs from Los demenciales... live.

By 1988, they decided to go independent to avoid conflicts with record labels. Thus, they founded their own record label called Buto Eskor (an anagram of Eskorbuto) and released their fourth studio album, Las más macabras de las vidas. This album focused on the themes of death anger, hopelessness, and disappointment. At this point Iosu and Juanma were suffering from serious health problems due to heroin addiction. Soon after, heroin became more prevalent in the lives of Iosu and Juanma, and they were called less to play.

In 1989, relations amongst band members began to suffer, even though all three felt that, as Eskorbuto had said, “only death can separate them.” Concerts became increasingly rare, leaving them with plenty of free time for future creative projects.

=== Mexico Tour and Demasiados enemigos... (1991) ===
In 1991, Eskorbuto received an offer to tour Mexico (the band’s first and only trip abroad), where they would travel without Iosu due to his health condition; he was replaced by Iñaki Huarte, guitarist for the band Speed, since Juanma was friends with that band. Huarte was given the setlist on the trip between the plane and the hotel. The concerts were scheduled for Saturday, April 13, and Sunday, April 14, at the former Olympic Spa in Pantitlán, Mexico City. However, both were canceled due to overselling and rescheduled for Saturday, April 20 (with Rebel’D Punk, Aquelarre, and Psicodencia) and Sunday, April 21 (with Síndrome Del Punk and Sedición as opening acts) at the López Mateos Arena in Tlalnepantla, State of Mexico. The shows led to a large number of disturbances and damage in the area, resulting in forty-seven injuries and seventy arrests. They were, however, a hit with the audience, performing to an audience of over 7,000 people.

Back from Mexico and after spending three weeks with Iñaki Huarte—and with Iosu out of the hospital—Eskorbuto reunited once again and decided to record a new album: Demasiados enemigos. It was released in late 1991 on the label Matraka.

=== Death of Iosu and Juanma (1992) ===
In December 1991, the band performed a New Year’s Eve show that was recorded as a new live album; however, dissatisfied with the results, they decided to re-record it in early 1992. By this point, however, Iosu’s declining health had become increasingly severe, prompting him to temporarily step away from the band once again to rest and recover.

Eskorbuto’s final concert took place in Matiena, a small town in Vizcaya, under a contract with a festival committee: a group of young people from the neighborhood. the contract was signed by Iosu de Txalupa and José Ignacio Delgado on April 30, 1992, and was the last contract signed by the “authentic” Eskorbuto while the original lineup of performers were still alive.

On May 31, 1992, Iosu Expósito died in Baracaldo from AIDS, which he had contracted as a result of his previous heroin addiction. A few months before his death, he had time to record a video for the program “Al día” on the Euskal Telebista (ETB) network, in which he gave an emotional and honest account of his experience with drugs, advising everyone—especially young people—never to get involved in that world and ruin their future. The video is titled "Iosu Expósito, bajo el caballo."

After Iosu's death, Juanma and Pako Galán decided to continue Eskorbuto with Urko Igartiburu as the new singer/guitarist. They began rehearsing a new project with him every Friday. However, Juanma died on October 9, 1992, after years of substance abuse and complications from endocarditis.

Following the deaths of Iosu and Juanma, Pako Galán announced in 1993 that he would continue with the band. This sparked widespread criticism and became one of the group’s most controversial episodes. In response to the negative response from fans, Pako responded, “Eskorbuto does whatever the hell it wants; we never rely on anyone for our projects or failures. We don’t need anything from anyone—nothing from you and nothing from rock. Eskorbuto was born to die protesting.” He also added, “Leaving Eskorbuto right now would be a clear victory for our enemies… and that will never happen!”

=== Eskorbuto and Breakup(1993–1999) ===
In 1993, Pako Galán began recording the original project they had started with Jualma, alongside Iñaki Gato on bass, and Urko Igartiburu and Garlopa on guitars. The result was the album Aki No Keda Ni Dios, released in 1994. This album featured songs that Pako and Juanma had composed in 1992. In 1995, Urko Igartiburu decided to step down from the band; he was replaced by Sergio Kalaña as the permanent lead singer. Miguel Ángel Manjón and Alik Kalaña took over the bass, replacing Iñaki Gato. With this lineup, they recorded the album Kalaña in 1996 for Discos Suicidas.

In 1998, the band released the album Dekadencia on the label Surco label, recorded with Sergio Kalaña on vocals, Alik Kalaña (who later left the band), Garlopa, and Miguel Ángel Manjón. This was Eskorbuto’s final album release. Neither this album nor the previous one had resonated with the public, leading to the band’s breakup. In 1999, the band officially disbanded.

== Social Context and Lyrical Themes ==
Eskorbuto emerged in the early 1980s in Santurce, a working-class town on the left bank of the Nervión River. This time was marked by industrial restructuring, which led to the closure of numerous factories, driving up the unemployment rate and leaving the economy in dire straits. In addition to these serious economic problems facing the Basque Country, there was police repression and widespread drug use. Also worth noting is the conflict over the Lemóniz nuclear power plant, which sparked citizen protests and even terrorist attacks between 1972 and 1984.

Political violence in the Basque Country reached its peak in 1980, the year in which ETA killed more than one hundred people. At that time, there were three violent groups operating simultaneously in the Basque Country: ETAm, ETApm, and the Autonomous Anti-Capitalist Commandos. There was also widespread extralegal police violence (the Spanish Basque Battalion, Triple A, and the GAL). Another event worth noting for the social context which inspired Eskorbuto was the attempted coup d’état of February 23, 1981 (23-F). Lyrics such as “so much lead wasted on unnecessary bodies” and “the old military men will want to win their last war” are directly inspired by these contexts.

In this context, Eskorbuto put into words and music the “sense of rootlessness” of a generation living in a “decaying, violent world that offered no desirable future.”

== Style and Influence ==
The group has stated their influences in punk and rock have included the Sex Pistols, the Clash, the Vibrators, the Rolling Stones, the Who, ZZ Top and Motörhead.

Eskorbuto wrote songs that quickly became anthems of the era, such as “Mucha policía, poca diversión” and “Historia triste.” Their lyrics were full of rage and social commentary. They were a highly controversial band, loved by many and hated by others. They never aligned themselves politically with any ideology, even going so far as to claim that “rock has no homeland, not even the Basque Country.”

Their relationships with other music groups were not good, even with La Polla Records (who they stole a guitar from) and Kortatu (particularly with Fermín Muguruza). This caused a boycott on one or another of them, and venues had to choose to have Eskorbuto or La Polla Records play.

== Members ==
Current Members

- Ali Kalaña - Bass and Lead vocals (1995-1999, 2016–present)
- Pako Galán - Drums (1982–1999, 2015–present)

Core Members

- Iosu Expósito - Guitar and vocals (1980-1992, until his death)
- Juanma Suárez - Bass and vocals (1980-1992, until his death)
- Pako Galán - Drums (1982–1999)

Other Members

- Rafael "Kañas" Moriel - Drums (1980)
- Layky - Bass guitar (1980–1981)
- Seni - Bass guitar (1982)
- Gugu - Drums (1981–1982)
- Garlopa - Guitar (1993–1999).
- Urko Igartiburu - Guitar and Vocals (1993–1995).
- Iñaki "Gato" - Bass guitar and Vocals (1993–1995), Lead Guitar (1991).
- Sergio - Lead Vocals (1995–1999).
- Miguel - Bass guitar (1995–1999).

== Discography ==
Studio Albums

- Eskizofrenia (1985)
- Anti Todo (1986)
- Los demenciales chicos acelerados (1987)
- Las más macabras de las vidas (1988)
- Demasiados enemigos... (1991)
- Aki no keda ni dios (1994)
- Kalaña (1996)
- Dekadencia (1998)

Live Albums

- Impuesto revolucionario (1986)
- La Otro Cara Del Rock, Live at Villarreal Castellón (2004)
- Ni fronteras, ni gobiernos (Recorded on April 10, 1987) (2007)

Demos

- Primeros ensayos 1982 (1992)
- Segunda maketa 1984: Que corra la sangre (2000)
- Primera maketa 1983: Jodiendolo todo (2000)

EPs

- Z.E.N. (Zona Especial Norte), with RIP (1984)
- Ya No Quedan Mas Cojones, Eskorbuto A Las Elecciones (1986)

Compilations

- El infierno es demasiado dulce (1992)
- Kanziones Malditas (1997)
- Kanziones Malditas II (1998)
- Maldito País: Primera Época 1982-84 (2010)

== See also ==
- Zarama
- Basque music
