= Juanma Suárez =

Spanish musician

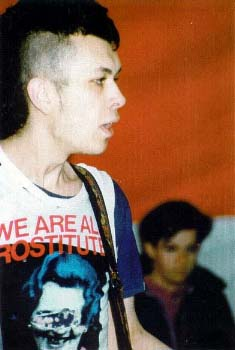

Background information
- Born: Juan Manuel Suárez Fernández; 11 July 1962
- Origin: Santurce, Vizcaya, Spain
- Died: 9 October 1992 (aged 30)
- Genres: Punk rock
- Occupations: Musician; composer
- Instruments: Vocals; bass
- Years active: 1980–1992
- Labels: DRO; Spansuls; Buto Eskor; Discos Suicidas

Juan Manuel Suárez Fernández (11 July 1962 – 9 October 1992) also known by Juanma Suárez was a Spanish punk rock bassist and singer, founder and member of one of the most influential Spanish punk rock bands, Eskorbuto, since 1980 to 1992. With Iosu Expósito founded a previous band called Sección Mortuoria (Spanish for Mortuary Section), then Muñecas de Acero (Spanish for Steel Dolls). His friend, Roberto Moso (leader and singer of Zarama), gave them the nickname "Eskorbuto" (scurvy in Spanish) for their scrawny look. He is widely considered an icon of Spanish punk.

== Career ==
=== Early life ===
Juanma Suárez attended the same high school where he was in the same class as Iosu Expósito. He was characterized by his dark sense of humor. He spent most of his life in a block of apartments on Lauaxeta Street, in Santurce. For a short time he was a barman; this was his only work experience before forming a rock band. During his youth he was a member of a Maoist group, and later on he became an engineer.

=== With Eskorbuto ===
Suárez employed dark themes, such as death and extermination, which contrasted with his bandmate Iosu Expósito's preference for political issues. Suárez often told him to lead off topics with the sentence: "No te comas la cabeza, hombre, que son cuatro días" (in English: Don't bother yourself, man, we live for four days). He wrote the songs "Historia triste" (Sad Story), "Cerebros Destruidos" (Destroyed Brains) and "Más allá del cementerio" (Beyond the Graveyard).

Juanma was a sexually active person, but was negligent with his health, he smoked, drank alcohol and took amphetamines. As early as the 1980s was said to be "un kamikaze del pastilleo" (kamikaze of drugs). Suffered from a case of endocarditis that nearly killed him in 1985, when he chose to treat himself with analgesics instead of seeking the advice of a doctor. Another serious hospitalization was at the early 1985. In 1988 his addiction to drugs became more complicated. He was frequently spotted on his white mobylette, working temporally to get money for heroin. His relationship with Iosu broke down during that period, although among them were never held distances.

== Death ==
On 9 October 1992 Juanma Suárez died in Santurce of a heart attack and resulting complications. He was 30. He was buried a short distance from his long-time friend Iosu Expósito.

== Equipment ==
Juanma mainly played a Westone Thunder 1A Bass to the late 1980s, he occasionally used a Fender Jazz Bass to the early 1990s. His playing style uses both pick and fingers, although he played mostly with picks.

== Discography with Eskorbuto ==
=== Studio albums ===
- Zona Especial Norte EP (1984)
- Eskizofrenia (1985)
- Anti Todo (1986)
- Ya No Quedan Más Cojones, Eskorbuto A Las Elecciones EP (1986)
- Los demenciales chicos acelerados (1987)
- Las mas macabras de las vidas (1988)
- Demasiados enemigos... (1991)

=== Live albums ===
- Impuesto revolucionario (1986)
- La Otro Cara Del Rock, Live at Villarreal, Castellón (2004)
- Sin fronteras, ni gobiernos (Recorded on 10 April 1987) (2007)

=== Compilations ===
- Jodiendolo todo (1983)
- Primeros ensayos 1982 (1992)
- Segunda maketa 1984: Que corra la sangre (1998)
