= Chiwawa =

Chiwawa may refer to:

- Chiwawa River
- Chiwawa class oiler
- "Chiwawa", a track in the 2015 dance video game Just Dance 2016

== See also ==
- Chihuahua (disambiguation)
- Chikwawa
