= Vulpes (band) =

Spanish punk rock band

Vulpes (aka Las VulpeSS) was the first Spanish all-female punk rock band, formed in Barakaldo (Greater Bilbao, Basque Country) in the summer of 1982. They became famous the following year when they appeared on Spain's national television programme Caja de Ritmos, performing their song "Me Gusta Ser una Zorra" ("I Like Being a Slut"). The song is a cover of the Stooges song "I Wanna Be Your Dog" with adapted Spanish lyrics. Many viewers complained about their performance, which was broadcast at noon on a Saturday, and a media scandal and court case ensued. The court case (a complaint filed by the public prosecutor's office) was dismissed by a judge in 1986.

To capitalise on the attention, the song was recorded and released as a single by the Dos Rombos record label, which went on to sell 12,000 copies. However, legal difficulties created problems for the group on their promotional tour. The band dissolved in 1983 although they reformed briefly in 1985 to play some gigs.

Lupe Vázquez died in 1993. The remaining Vulpes reformed for a concert in 2005. An album of rerecordings, Me Gusta Ser, was released in 2006.

== Members ==
- Loles Vázquez "Anarkoma Zorrita" – guitar
- Mamen Rodrigo "Evelyn Zorrita" – voice
- Begoña Astigarraga "Ruth Zorrita" – bass
- Lupe Vázquez "Pigüy Zorrita" – drums

== Discography ==
- "Me Gusta Ser una Zorra" / "Inkisición" (7-inch, Dos Rombos ["Two Diamonds"], 1983).
- Barbarela '83 (LP, Punk Away, 2012)
- Me Gusta Ser (CD, Oihuka, 2006).

== Sources ==
- Álvaro Heras Gröh (2008). Lluvia, Hierro y Rock&Roll: Historia de las bandas de rock de Bilbao. Ediciones Sirimiri – Vudumedia. ISBN 978-84-612-5979-3.

== See, also ==
- Radical Basque Rock
