= Negu Gorriak (album) =

Studio album by Negu Gorriak
- Released: June 1990
- Recorded: May 1990
- Studios: Estudios IZ, San Sebastián
- Genres: rock, hardcore, hip hop, punk, reggae, ska
- Length: 33:49 (original); 36:19 (re-release)
- Labels: Oihuka (original), Esan Ozenki (re-release)
- Producer: Negu Gorriak

Negu Gorriak chronology
Negu Gorriak (1990)	Gure Jarrera (1991)

Singles from Negu Gorriak
- 1. "Radio Rahim" Released: June 1990; 2. "Bertso-Hop" Released: December 1990

Negu Gorriak is the eponymous debut album by the Basque band Negu Gorriak. It was released in June 1990 and the band was intentional in its use of an independent record label, Oihuka.

The secrecy around the new project was made clear by the fact that they did not have any intention to do live shows nor provide any information about the album they had the intention to record.
