= Helduen Alfabetatze eta Berreuskalduntzerako Erakundea =

State-owned institution fomenting the learning of the Basque language

HABE (Helduen Alfabetatze eta Berreuskalduntzerako Erakundea) (Institution for Adults Alphabetization and Revasconization) is a Basque government institution which works to help adults learn the Basque language. Since its inception in 1983, The Government of the Basque Autonomous Community has opened a network of euskaltegi, Basque language education centres. HABE was created in 1983 and since then it has opened 107 euskaltegis with 1500 teachers and over 350,000 students throughout the network. Additionally, roughly between 3000 and 4000 people outside of the Basque Country study Basque through HABE each year.

Its headquarters are on Vitoria-Gasteiz street, Donostia.
