= San Mateo (Cantabria) =

Coordinates: 43°16′23″N 4°4′43″W

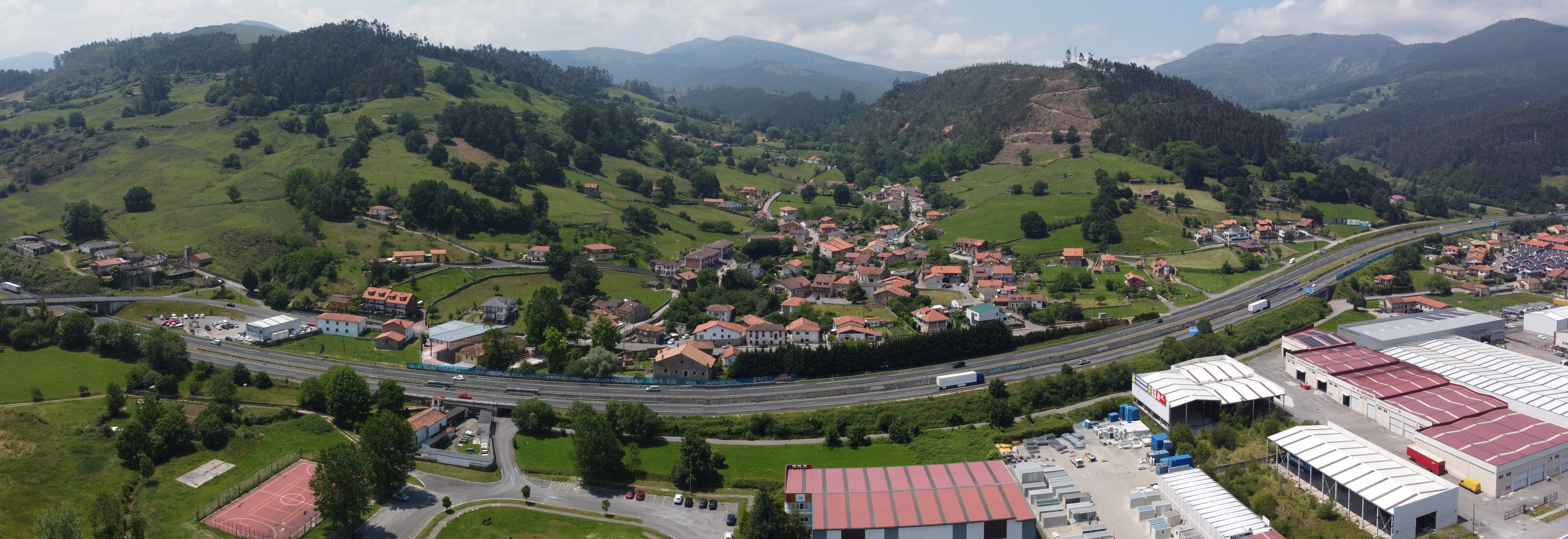
San Mateo

San Mateo is a village in the municipality of Los Corrales de Buelna in the autonomous community of Cantabria, Spain. The Rebujas runs through it. It is bordered to the north by Barros, to the south-east by Los Corrales de Buelna and the west by Saja-Besaya Natural Park. In 2016, its population was 290. It is located within the Central European Time Zone (GMT+1).

It is the site of the Rebujas Rock festival.
