= Chihuahua =

Chihuahua usually refers to:

- Chihuahua (state), a state in Mexico
- Chihuahua (city), capital city of that state
- Chihuahua (dog breed), a breed of dog named after the state

Chihuahua may also refer to:

== Food ==
- Queso Chihuahua, a type of cheese originating in the state

== Music ==
- "Chihuahua" (song), a song by Louis Oliveira and His Bandodalua Boys, covered and made famous by DJ BoBo
- "Chihuahua", a song by The Sugarcubes from the 1992 album Stick Around for Joy
- "Chihuahua", a song by Bow Wow Wow from See Jungle! See Jungle! Go Join Your Gang Yeah, City All Over! Go Ape Crazy!
- "Chihuahua", a song by Kaotiko (a punk-rock band from Basque country) from the 2003 album Raska y Pierde

== People ==
- Chihuahua (chief), a leader of the Chiricahua tribe of Apache Native Americans

== Places ==
- Chihuahua (city), the capital city of the Mexican state
- Chihuahua (municipality), the municipality surrounding the city
- Chihuahuan Desert, the second largest desert in North America
- Chihuahua tradition, a proposed archaeological tradition for that desert region
- Chihuahua, Uruguay, a resort in the Maldonado department of Uruguay

== Vessels ==
- ARM Chihuahua, a ship of the Mexican Navy
