= RIP (band) =

Punk band from Basque Country (Spain)

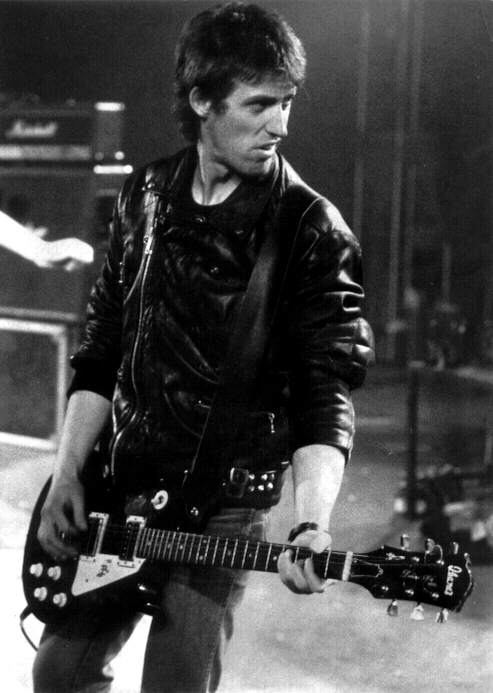
- Guitarist Jul, 1986

Background information
- Origin: Mondragón, Basque Autonomous Community
- Genres: Punk; Hardcore punk D-beat
- Years active: 1981–1988; 1994–2003
- Labels: Spansuls Records; Basati Diskak
- Past members: Mahoma†; Yul†; Portu†; Txerra

R.I.P. was a hardcore punk group from Mondragón, Basque Autonomous Community (Spain), and were part of the Basque Radical Rock musical movement in the early 1980s. By 2014, three of the band's classic four members — lead singer Karlos "Mahoma" Agirreurreta, bassist "Portu" Mancebo and guitarist Jul Bolinaga — had died.

== History ==
=== 1981–1983: The beginning ===
In 1981, the Bolinaga brothers Jul and Txerra formed a band called Doble Cero, along with bassist and singer Eduardo Mancebo, a.k.a. "Portu". They added Juan Luis Mallabi as lead singer, and initially pursued a hardcore punk direction. Mallabi was then drafted for military service, and was replaced by the group manager Karlos Agirreurreta, best known as "Mahoma", i.e. Muhammad.

When Mallabi returned to the band, tensions escalated between him and "Mahoma", making Mallabi walk out from the group.

=== 1984–1988: Breakthrough, No Te Muevas and first hiatus ===
The remaining members renamed the band as RIP, releasing the maxi-single Zona Especial Norte in 1984, edited by the label Basati Diskak, shared with Eskorbuto.

In 1985, although they could only get an independent record deal, releasing their first live album: 83 84 Elgoibar Vitoria Lasarte Barna, this recording has subsequently become more widely available as cassette (then as CD re-issue by Destruye!!! Records in 2006). RIP opened the Euskal Rock festival, at Barcelona in November 1985, along with La Polla Records, Kortatu and Cicatriz.

In 1987, they launched their only full studio album No Te Muevas, released by the label Basati Diskak. It is generally regarded as one of the most important albums in the history of Basque and Spanish punk. But then in 1988, the members broke up the band.

In 1991, the band reconvened to play in a concert for the Arrasate Press festival, at Mondragón.

=== 1994–2003: Reunion and final break-up ===
While Fermin Muguruza was working on a festival in 1994, he and his own label Esan Ozenki, invited Mahoma, Jul, Txerra and Portu to share the show with another bands, officially reunited as RIP. By 1995, the reunion show was released on CD as HIESari Aurre Egiten!!. On 1996 Portu died from a heroin overdose, replaced by his brother Xabi temporally.

In 2001, RIP recorded for the last time a new song, "Anti-Politica", for the compilation Gaztetxeak martxan! In 2003 Karlos "Mahoma" died from cancer, and that was the end of the band. In parallel, Jul and Txerra formed by 2003 with Evaristo Páramos the short-lived group The Kagas, then The Meas in 2004.

On 15 November 2014, the band's co-founding member, Jul Bolinaga, died in Guipúzcoa while performing with his band The Potes. His death, at the age of 50, was the result of a heart attack.

== Personnel ==
Classic Line-Up (1983–1996)

- Karlos "Mahoma" Agirreurreta† - Lead vocals.
- Jul Bolinaga† - Lead guitar.
- Portu Mancebo† - Bass guitar, backing vocals.
- Txerra Bolinaga - Drums.

== Discography ==
=== Studio albums ===
- Zona Especial Norte (12" EP, Spansuls Records, ZENS 45007, 1984), split album with Eskorbuto. Reissued on CD by Discos Suicidas in 1991 and 1996.
- No Te Muevas (LP, Basati Diskak, 8/87). Reissued on CD by Discos Suicidas in 1996.

=== Live albums ===
- 83 84 Elgoibar Vitoria Lasarte Barna (Destruye C.O.M. 001, 1985, re-issue in 2006)
- HIESari Aurre Egiten!! (CD, ...Ta Segi Aurrera!!!/Esan Ozenki, 1995)
- Punkaren 25 Urteko Historia Bizia. Historia viva del Punk (CD and DVD, Goiena-Hotsak, 2006)

=== Demos ===
- Premiere demo (1983, 4 songs, including "Brigada criminal" and "Anti-militar")

=== Compilations ===
- Spanish HC (BCT Tapes, 1984)
