= Zarama (band) =

Organization

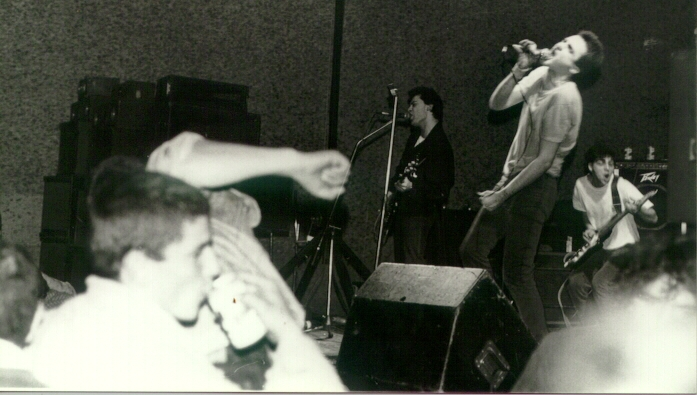
A Zarama concert on its early stage

Zarama is a Spanish music band in the Basque Radical Rock genre formed in 1977. The band, spearheaded by Roberto Moso, got together at Santurtzi, (Biscay, Basque Autonomous Community, Spain), combining for the first time punk rock and Basque language, a cultural mingling fraught with difficulties at the time.

After its first steps during a period in which local punk music cohabited in the Basque Country with socio-political turmoil and violence, the band transitioned towards more sophisticated and cleaner sounds and more personal lyrics, especially after 1989 (album Bostak bat). It made a comeback in 2009, following a hiatus of several years. By then, it had released 5 LP albums and 2 EPs.

== See also ==
- Basque music
- Kortatu
- Eskorbuto
