= Guerrilla Urbana (Spanish band) =

- Origin: San Cristóbal de La Laguna, Canary Islands
- Genres: Punk rock
- Years active: 1983–present
- Members: Rocko; Angelucho; Zurda; Chiru
- Past members: Ojo Trueno; Cuervo; David; Fredi; Tato; Pachon

Guerrilla Urbana (Urban Guerrilla in Spanish language) is a punk-rock group of the Canary Islands.

== History ==
The group was formed in San Cristóbal de La Laguna (Tenerife) in 1983, sharing members with Eskorbuto Crónico, a pioneering punk-rock band in the Canary Islands dating back to the late 1970s. Gradually, the members of this group were integrated into Guerrilla Urbana as the original members were leaving the band until, in mid-1984, Eskorbuto Crónico was dissolved. Two years later "Cuervo", the drummer, was also brought into the band, the final member joining.

After numerous local performances, two tours in the Basque Country and several demos, Guerrilla Urbana recorded their first album, Razón de Estado, in 1989.

In 2012, Guerrilla Urbana released their tenth album, the first recorded live, called Serenata para antro y chusma Opus X.

== Ideas ==
The majority of the lyrics of the group are either about social issues or on antireligious, antimilitaristic, antiauthoritarian, anti-fascist and anticolonialist themes. The group members are close to anarchist ideas.

== Members ==
- Angelucho: drums
- Chiru: bass guitar
- Rocko: vocals
- Zurda: guitar

== Discography ==
- Razón de Estado (1989)
- Toque a Degüello (1992)
- Palabra de Dios (1994)
- Spanish Diarrea (1996)
- Bestiario (2000)
- Guerrilla Urbana 1983–1993 (Compilation) (2000)
- La Venganza de los Pueblos (2002)
- Microcefalia (2006)
- Incendiario (2009)
- Guerrilla Urbana / Escorbuto Crónico (2011)
- Serenata para antro y chusma Opus X (Live) (2012)
- Apátridas (2018)
- Destrípate (2021)
