= Negu Gorriak =

Spanish band from the Basque Country

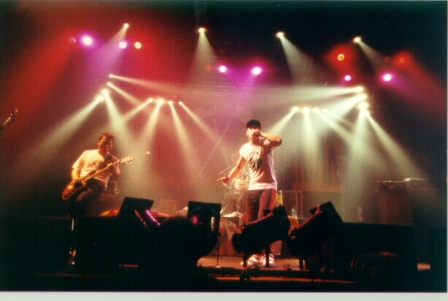

Background information
- Origin: Gipuzkoa, Basque Country
- Genres: Rock; hardcore; hip-hop; ska; reggae
- Years active: 1990–1996; 2001
- Past members: Fermin Muguruza, Iñigo Muguruza, Kaki Arkarazo, Mikel Anestesia, Mikel Bap

Negu Gorriak (Basque: "Red Winters", a phrase that means "Severe/Harsh Winters") were an underground group from the Basque Country. Their musical style combines various styles such as hardcore punk, hip-hop, ska, and reggae, always linked to the band's political ideology and its identification with the Basque Country and its language (Euskara).

== History ==
Negu Gorriak was formed in 1990 by the brothers Fermin and Iñigo Muguruza with Kaki Arkarazo (former members of the band Kortatu). Later in 1990, Mikel Anestesia joined them and in 1991, Mikel Bap. This was the complete membership of the group until its dissolution in 1996.

They were completely committed to the political movement, starting with their choice to sing only in Basque and continuing through their way of work and the message in their songs. They decided to manage themselves and created the record label Esan Ozenki (Basque: Say it loudly). They performed their first concert in front of Herrera de la Mancha maximum security prison, leading to problems with the government. They were denounced by the Guardia Civil general, and leader of the state-sponsored death squad GAL, Enrique Rodríguez Galindo for the lyrics of the song «Ustelkeria», which accuses the general and the Guardia Civil of being involved in drug trafficking. This was the first time since the end of Francoist Spain that the government denounced a form of expression. These charges were dropped in 2001, five years after the group stopped performing together. In honour of their legal victory, the group performed three celebratory concerts to more than 30,000 people.

== Basque nationalism and other influences ==
Negu Gorriak was formed at the end of the Basque Radical Rock movement of the 1980s, a genre most similar to punk. Their sound can be identified as a mixture of Basque Radical Rock and American hip-hop. The Basque nationalist movement greatly affected the music and actions of all the members of the group. All of their songs are in Basque, and two of the group's members went to adult Basque language school (Euskaltegiak) in order to be able to communicate in their language. This was a strong message to the Basque Nationalist movement, demonstrating the importance of language with regard to identity. Negu Gorriak also incorporated traditional Basque instruments into their music, such as the trikitixa.

Negu Gorriak was also heavily influenced by American hip-hop and the African-American community. They considered Public Enemy one of their biggest influences because of their use of militant hip-hop to spread a message to African-Americans. The group related to the oppression of the African-American community because they viewed themselves, as Basques, similarly oppressed. However, when Public Enemy toured Spain, the group was disappointed that Public Enemy were ignorant to their cause. The popularity of Negu Gorriak was rapidly growing at this point throughout the world, and they turned to other oppressed people who appreciated the ally.

Blatantly criticizing the Spanish government, Negu Gorriak songs condemn police brutality, Spanish institutions like the Catholic Church, and the past Francoist State and its current remnants. Their song "Corruption" about police brutality accused the chief of police of San Sebastián of having ties to embezzling drugs. After releasing this song, the group was tried and required to pay 15 million pesetas (approx. €90,150). Just weeks later the chief of police was convicted of the drug charges. Thus, Negu Gorriak not only used their music to express ideas and opinions, they also educated the youth about the reality of the Basque Country situation and the restrictive policies of the new government. The group logo shows two crossed axes on a red background, that some people consider to be related to ETA's symbol, made up of a snake winding up an axe. With such a militant message, it is no surprise that the group idolised many black militants including Malcolm X, making more of a connection with the racist oppression and a marginalised form of expression, hip hop.

For these reasons, Negu Gorriak used hip hop not only to reach the young listeners, but also to make a radical political statement. On Negu Gorriak's album Esan Ozenki, the title of the track "Napartheid" (1990) is a pun cross-referencing the discrimination of the Basque culture and people in the province of Navarre to the system of legalized racism in South Africa. Furthermore, the song continues to pull at racism with the lyrics such as "the white man has invaded our earth. There is no peace, we have unearthed for always the war axe and it will stand until the death ends with us". These lyrics use the white man to symbolise the threat of Spanish nationalism and central government domination. Moreover, connecting the apartheid in South Africa with the Spanish political system draws on themes of injustice, racism, and oppression. All of these ideas allow the Basque people, like those of other stateless nations throughout the world, to use hip-hop music to make the connection between minority communities worldwide and the black experience in America. Then, the song calls for action against these restrictive institutions by saying, "let’s break the chains imposed by the white man". This is the very essence of Gorriak's music, not only creating awareness for the cause but also calling for organisation and action.

== Members ==
- Fermin Muguruza – lead singer
- Íñigo Muguruza – guitarist
- Kaki Arkarazo – guitarist
- Mikel Anestesia – bassist since Gure Jarrera (1991)
- Mikel Bap – drummer since Gure Jarrera (1991)

== Discography ==
- Negu Gorriak (1990)
- Gure Jarrera (1991)
- Gora Herria (1991)
- Borreroak Baditu Milaka Aurpegi (1993)
- Hipokrisiari Stop! Bilbo 93-X-30 (1994)
- Ideia Zabaldu (1995)
- Ustelkeria (1996)
- Salam, agur (1996)
- 1990-2001 (DVD + Live CD) (2005)

== See also ==
- Basque music

== Bibliography ==
- Urla, Jacqueline (2001). ""We are All Malcolm X!"" Global Noise: Rap and Hip-Hop Outside the USA. Ed. Toni Mitchell. New York: Wesleyen UP.
