= Skalariak =

Spanish ska band

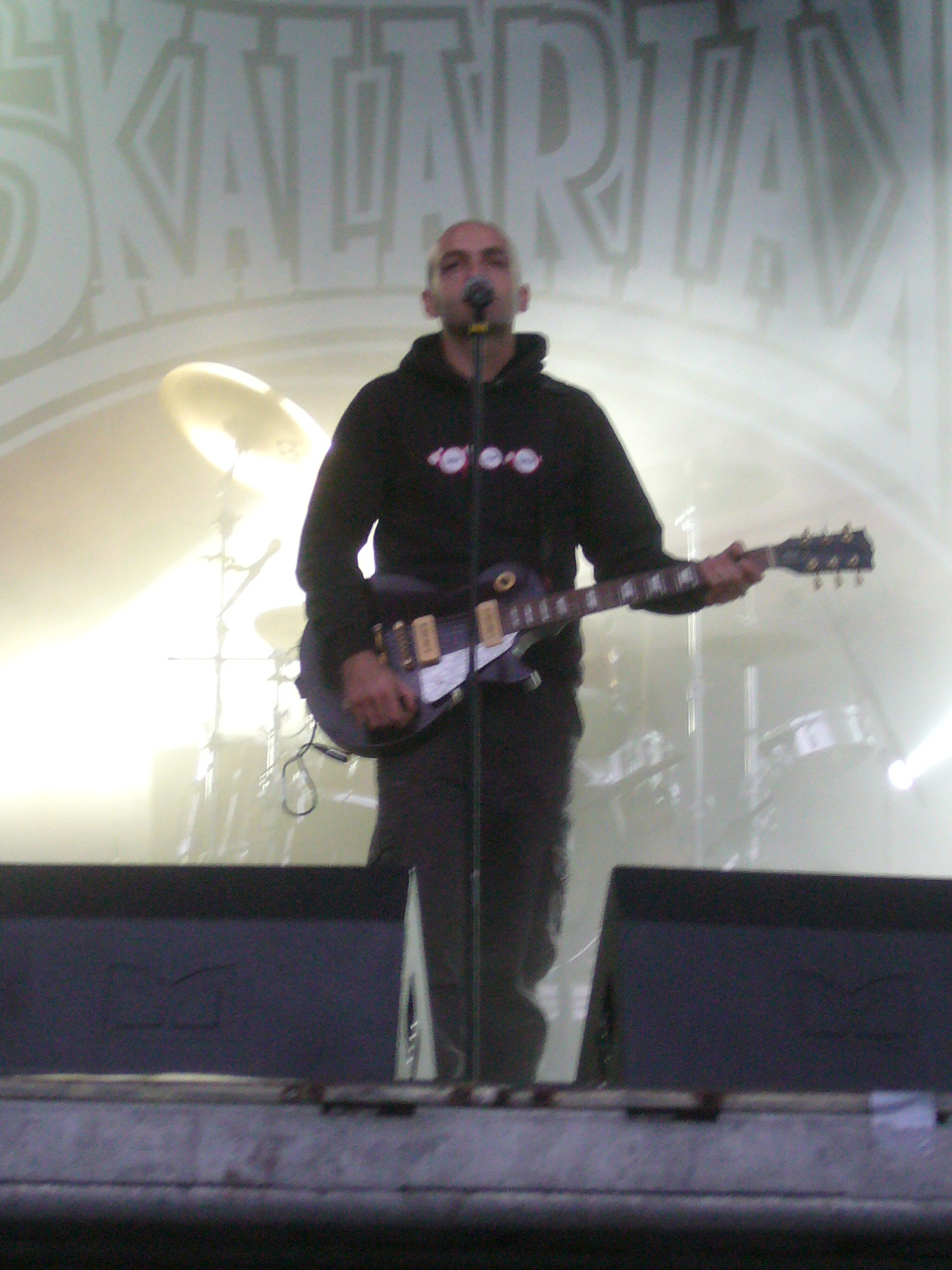

Background information
- Origin: Navarre, Spain
- Genres: ska, punk, reggae
- Years active: 1994–2008
- Labels: Gor diskak, Boa
- Members: Juantxo Skalari; Javier Etxeberria; Luisillo Kalandraka; Mario Memola; Enrique Rubiños; Guillermo; Rubén Antón; Olatz Andueza
- Past members: Zara; Naiara Krutxaga; Marco Bellizzi; David Orduña; Peio Skalari; Hiart Leitza
- Website: www.skalariak.com

Skalariak is a Spanish ska band founded in 1994 in Navarre by Juantxo Skalari and Peio Skalari. Their lyrics are in Spanish and Basque. In their works the sounds of punk, reggae, and other styles can also be found.

== Members ==
=== Current members ===
- Juantxo Skalari: vocals
- Javier Etxeberria: guitar
- Luisillo Kalandraka: bass
- Mario Memola: saxophone
- Enrique Rubiños: drums
- Guillermo: trombone
- Rubén Antón: trumpet
- Olatz Andueza: keyboard + accordion

=== Former Members ===
- Zara (Cristina Zariategi): bass
- Naiara Krutxaga: keyboard
- Marco Bellizzi: trombone
- David Orduña: trumpet
- Peio Skalari: drums
- Hiart Leitza: keyboard

== Discography ==
=== Albums ===
- Skalariak (Gor, 1997) CD.
- Namaluj Certa Na Zed (Gor, 1998) CD.
- Klub Ska (Gor, 1999) CD.
- En la kalle (Gor, 2001) CD.
- Radio Ghetto (Boa Music, 2003) CD.
- Luz rebelde (Boa Music, 2005) CD.
- Ska Republik Concert (Maldito Records, 2008) 2CD + DVD.

=== Singles ===
- O neure herri (Gor, 1997). CD-single.
- Sólo vivir (Gor, 1998). CD-single.
- Skalari Rude Klub (Gor, 2001). CD-single.
- Vodka Revolution (Gor, 2001). CD-single.
- Baietz Oraingoan! (2006). Single.

=== Videos ===
- Skalariak: Street's Ska (Gor, 2003). DVD.

=== Compilation Contributions ===
- "Txapeldunak" in Latin Ska Vol. II (Moon Ska, 1996). CD.
- "O neure herri" in Skankin' the Scum Away (Mad Butcher, 1998). CD. German compilation of European ska bands.
- "Sólo vivir" in UniverSonoro Vol. 5 (BOA, 1999). CD.
- "Uníos" in Wir Haben Eine Weltz Zu Gewinnen (Mad Butcher, 2000). CD. German compilation of European ska bands.
- Latin Ska Jazz (Sock It, 2000). CD.
- "Arazoak arazo" in Nafarroa Hitza Dantzan (Nafarroako Bertsozale Elkartea/Gor, 2001). CD in which Navarrese groups interpret poems of different Navarrese bertsolaris.
- Dance Ska La. 2001 (Banana Juice, 2001). CD.
