= Euskaltegi =

Basque language school

An euskaltegi is a centre for learning the Basque language. They can be either public or private.

The term euskaltegi is made up of the words euskal coming from the Basque name of the Basque language and -tegi, a suffix indicating a place or abode of something. The term can thus be translated either as "place/house of the Basque language".

Starting in 2020, studying at any one of the Basque country's 103 euskaltegiak (plural of euskaltegi) has been made free up to a level of B2.

== See also ==
- Alfabetatze Euskalduntze Koordinakundea, an organization representing private euskaltegiak.
- Helduen Alfabetatze eta Berreuskalduntzerako Erakundea, an organization representing the euskaltegiak owned by the Basque Government.
- Ikastola, a school teaching in Basque.
