= Kaotiko =

- Origin: Salvatierra, Basque Country, Spain
- Genres: Rock, punk
- Years active: 1999–Present
- Labels: Baga-Biga, Ohiuka
- Website: kaotiko.com

Kaotiko is a punk group from Salvatierra, Álava, Basque Country, Spain.

== History ==
The band was formed at the end of 1999 in Salvatierra. Three of its members (Aguayo, Fonta and Aguayiko) come from the group Kaos Etiliko. In September 2001 they released their first album, "Mundo kaotiko". In April 2003 was published their second disc "Raska y pierde". With these two discs, on 17 April decided to record a DVD at the Azkena room of Vitoria, that finally published on 14 March. With a new label come, "Destino escrito". In this disk collaborate "el drogas" (Barricada) in the songs "Abuso" and "Correre". La Miki, singer of No Relax, collaborated on second voice in "Recuerdo". The album is recorded in the studies Katarain, in Azkarate, between December 2005 and January 2006.

On 21 February 2008, Kaotiko published his fifth job, "Adrenalina", with the Oihuka label. This album contain the collaboration of Evaristo (La Polla, Gatillazo) and Banda Bassotti with them they recorded the theme "Luna Rossa".

In 2010 they released their album "Reacciona", with the record company "Baga-Biga".

Their last album is called "E.H Calling", they published in 2013. The Clash as regards for the title, paraphrasing "London calling", the group returned with their sixth work. This is the first time that they have been so long without new material. They were used to produce two song per year, but this time they have been three years without producing anything. They come back with the same members, the same discography Baga-Biga. They introduced their album like an absolute renewal, due to they changed the sound and the content comparing with the works which they had done before. Thanks to the production of Jimmy from Soziedad Alkoholika has known how to harden the material without losing the essence of accessibility, choruses and melodies.

== Members ==
- Mortx: bass and choirs
- Aguayo: guitar
- Jony: voice
- Aguayiko: guitar and choirs
- Xabi: drums and choirs

== Former Member ==
- Fonta

bass and choirs

== Discography ==
=== Mundo kaotiko ===
Published in 2001 with the record company Oihuka.

No.	Title	Length
1.	"Soberbia"	2:59
2.	"Mi curro"	3:17
3.	"Otra noche"	3:11
4.	"Odio obedecer"	3:01
5.	"Contento de ser así"	2:56
6.	"No, Como Barby no!!"	3:19
7.	"En el barrio de latón"	3:29
8.	"Vueltas y vueltas"	3:32
9.	"Mundo Kaotiko"	3:16
10.	"El último hipy"	3:28
11.	"María libre"	2:53
12.	"Siempre igual"	3:13
13.	"Jhimy kaos!!"	2:06

=== Raska y pierde ===
Published in 2003 with the record company Oihuka.

No.	Title	Length
1.	"Rico deprimido"	3:15
2.	"Juerga"	3:08
3.	"Yo nunca estuve allí"	3:17
4.	"La culpa de todo la tienes tú"	3:48
5.	"Chihuahuha"	3:05
6.	"Sucio criminal"	3:02
7.	"El circo"	3:03
8.	"Paranoia"	3:30
9.	"Preso 2023"	3:30
10.	"Fuera de control"	3:10
11.	"Raska y pierde"	3:19
12.	"Visto lo visto"	3:51
13.	"Amo a la gente"	3:05

=== Directo ===
Published in 2005 with the record company GOR Discos.

No.	Title	Length
1.	"Intro"	1:24
2.	"Ansiedad"	2:17
3.	"Soberbia"	3:21
4.	"Guerra"	2:33
5.	"Sale el sol"	4:01
6.	"Sucio Criminal"	3:04
7.	"La gran chingada"	2:26
8.	"Raska y pierda"	3:22
9.	"Rico deprimido"	3:14
10.	"Chiuaua"	3:19
11.	"Impossible"	2:43
12.	"Preso 2023"	3:28
13.	"Yo nunca estuve allí"	3:20
14.	"En la barra del bar"	3:44
15.	"Otra noche"	3:09
16.	"Y ahora que"	2:43
17.	"Paranoia"	3:33
18.	"Siempre igual"	3:12
19.	"Barrio de laton"	4:47
20.	"La culpa de todo la tienes tú"	4:24
21.	"Mi mejor colega"	2:06
22.	"Juerga"	3:07
23.	"Su falso mundo"	4:31

=== Destino escrito ===
Published in 2006 with the record company Universal Music.

No.	Title	Length
1.	"No es lo mismo"	3:45
2.	"Destino escrito"	3:27
3.	"Recuerdo"	2:54
4.	"Censura"	3:35
5.	"Otro mundo"	3:18
6.	"Abuso"	3:00
7.	"La mirada perdida"	4:00
8.	"Fanático"	3:45
9.	"Ciencia ficción"	3:47
10.	"Correré"	3:00
11.	"La venganza"	3:27
12.	"Loco yo?"	2:33
13.	"Mísera vida"	2:42
14.	"El gran txupinazo"	3:12

=== Adrenalina ===
Published in 2008 with the record company Oihuka.

No.	Title	Length
1.	"Adrenalina"	3:04
2.	"Alcoholemia"	3:20
3.	"Infancia"	3:08
4.	"Y tu que miras"	4:08
5.	"Oh Caroline!!"	246
6.	"Este muerto está muy vivo"	3:19
7.	"Paradisu taberna"	2:46
8.	"Buscando la mina"	2:39
9.	"Okupas S.A."	3:34
10.	"Oculto sueño"	3:17
11.	"Tic-Tac"	3:17
12.	"Malas ideas"	2:52
13.	"Luna Rossa"	3:54

=== Reacciona ===
Published in 2010 with the record company Baga-Biga.

No.	Title	Length
1.	"Quien manda aquí"
2.	"Bienvenido al show"
3.	"Al final del túnel"
4.	"Levantad la voz"
5.	"A kms"
6.	"Crisis"
7.	"Pederasta"
8.	"Gloria"
9.	"El txarly y el rata"
10.	"Adios"
11.	"Míratelo"
12.	"Distantas armas"
13.	"Resurrección"

=== E.H. Calling ===
Published in 2013 with the record company Baga-Biga.

No.	Title	Length
1.	"Psycho"	03:00
2.	"Boca de cristal"	03:07
3.	"Presa"	03:09
4.	"Así es la vida"	03:30
5.	"Hitz egin begiekin"	03:05
6.	"Triste historia"	02:49
7.	"Recarga"	02:32
8.	"Diario de un preso"	03:27
9.	"Fuera de juego"	02:44
10.	"Nuestro momento"	03:03
11.	"Un mal sueño"	03:07
12.	"Falta de riego"	03:20
13.	"Cuervos"	03:06
