= Egin (newspaper) =

Basque newspaper (1977–1998)

Egin was a Basque newspaper written in Spanish language and Basque language. Founded in 1977 the paper was in circulation until 1998 when it was closed down by the Spanish government.

== History and profile ==
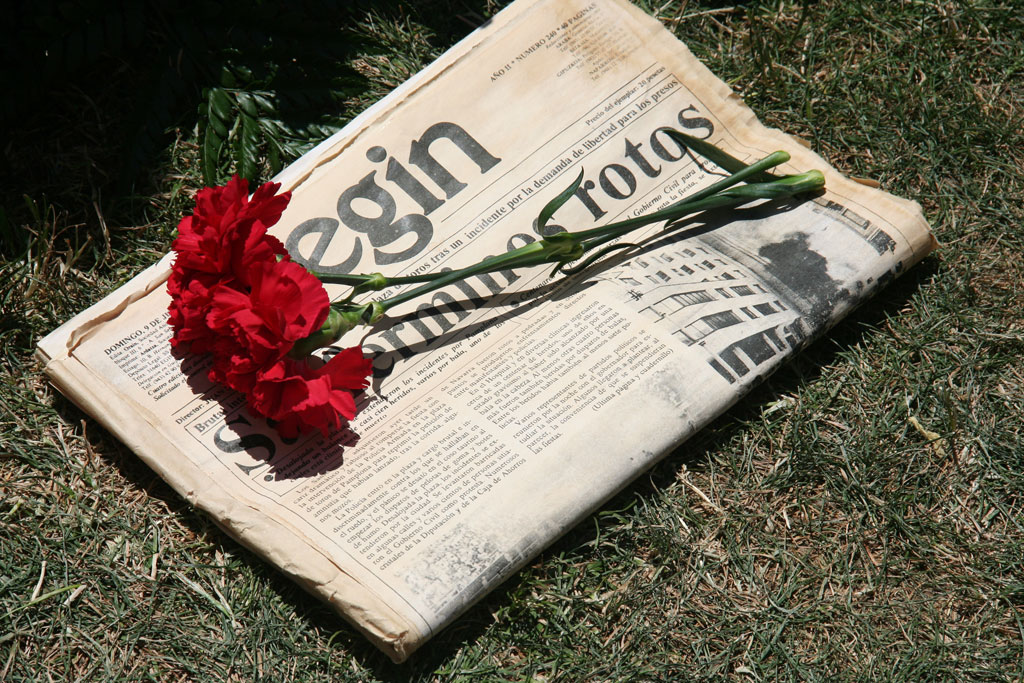
Cover of Egin in the wake of the 1978 San Fermín events

The first issue of Egin was published on 29 September 1977. The paper was published from Hernani by Orain SA, which also ran the radio station Egin Irratia. In 1993 its circulation was 51,366 copies. The publication was a major driving force behind Basque Radical Rock, releasing in 1987 the compilation Bat, Bi, Hiru... Hamar, considered a watershed in that musical movement.

For many years Egin was accused of being used by the separatist organization Euskadi Ta Askatasuna (ETA). One of its editors-in-chief was Josu Muguruza, a politician from Herri Batasuna, who was assassinated on 20 November 1989. In 1985, the editor Xabier Galeano was killed by the death squads GAL in the context of the 'dirty war'. In 1994, the Ertzaintza (Basque police) searched the headquarters of Egin.

== Closure after police operation ==
At dawn on 14 July 1998 Judge Baltasar Garzón ordered the precautionary closure of both media and the arrest of several of Orain, SA directives. Concern rose and anger mounted across the Basque Country for what many political, cultural personalities and jurists considered a politically driven operation of dubious legal grounds. It was followed by a mass demonstration and other street protests. Spanish president José María Aznar labeled it "an attack on terrorism", and left little margin as to the driving force behind the action, asserting with some bravado whether "someone thought we did not dare do it", which did not add to political reassurance, especially in the Basque context.

Spanish Socialist opposition leader Alfredo Pérez Rubalcaba accused the Spanish premier of attempting "to capitalize on this issue" to garner votes in Spain. Also in the Spanish context, Izquierda Unida leader Julio Anguita put the operation down directly to a governmental order. In August 1999, the judge authorised the reopening of the newspaper. However, by then the machinery had been dismantled or left useless by lack of upkeep, with the promoters having no funds, since they were being used to pay bails and fines imposed on the defendants. The newspaper remained closed.

The controversial 1998 police operation inaugurated a period of collective police raids and trials led by judge Baltasar Garzón under the motto "everything is ETA" against parties, political figures, associations, and media with Basque nationalist left sympathies or affinities.

== No grounds for closure ==
After over 10 years of proceedings, in 2009 the Spanish High Court overruled a previous sentence, declaring that no illicit activity was engaged by the newspaper and radio station Egin. The closure of newspaper Egin was followed by the release of Gara, relying initially on popular subscription. In 2004, the only Basque language newspaper Egunkaria was shut down in a Civil Guard raid on similar circumstances, and similar outcome: acquittal and case dismissed, but all its activity ceased. Afterwards, no damages have been allocated or public apologies made by state institutions.
