= La Polla Records =

Spanish punk rock band

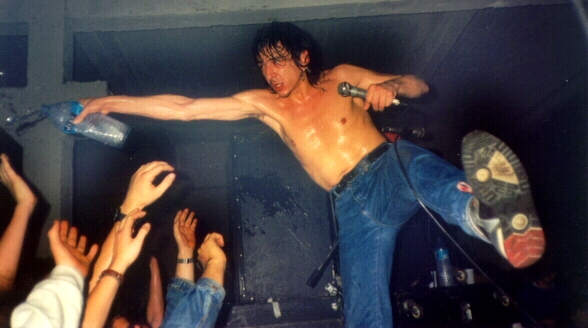
- Evaristo performing in a concert

Background information
- Also known as: La Polla
- Origin: Salvatierra, Basque Country, Spain
- Genres: Punk rock, hardcore punk
- Years active: 1979–2003; 2019-2021
- Labels: Oihuka; Gor Discos; Maldito Records
- Past members: Evaristo Paramos; Abel; Fernandito (deceased); Txarly; Sume; Maleguin; Tripi; Jokin; Txiki
- Website: www.lapollarecords.net

La Polla Records was a punk rock band from the Basque Country, formed in 1979 in Salvatierra/Agurain, a small town in Álava, Spain. Its founders were Evaristo Páramos "Evaristo" on vocals, Maleguin on bass, Fernandito on drums and Txarly and Sumé on guitars. The name was somewhat controversial because in Spanish, "polla" is vulgarly slang for "cock, penis". The lyrics of the band harshly criticized fascism, militarism, capitalism, and catholicism. La Polla Records has been very influential in the Spanish-language punk scene.

La Polla Records was a band that was known as a symbol of rebellion against everything, to the point of them being called "anti-everything". As a result of this they faced several major obstacles throughout their career, primarily threats and repression. The band members even faced jail time during a concert with Eskorbuto, another Basque punk band. In 2019, they announced a comeback and released an album after 16 years off-stage as a band. In 2021 they disbanded again.

== Background ==
=== 1979–1983: Early years ===
On 9 December 1979, inspired by the British punk movement, La Polla Records did their first gig at the only pub from Salvatierra, with all the town's people at the show, in words of Evaristo: "to see what the fools of the village made".

In 1981, the band performed and recorded their first demo called Banco Vaticano, never released officially. During this time, the band performed some shows in Basque Country and the rest of the Spain territories, although the group's popularity was low because they had yet to embrace punk on the level seen in the UK.

The band recorded their first EP called ¿Y ahora qué? ("So Now What?") in 1983, containing four songs, under the indie label Oihuka, where they managed to draw the attention of producer Marino Goñi.

=== 1984–1989: First albums and breakthrough success in Spain ===
By 1984, La Polla Records began frequently playing large shows, also releasing their first LP Salve, to Oihuka label and produced by Marino Goñi. The album was certified Gold, but the group rejected the disc. The following years they recorded Revolución (1985), with Abel Murua replacing Maleguin on the bass in this album. That same year played in the Euskal Rock festival at Barcelona, along with Kortatu, RIP and Cicatriz.

In early 1986, La Polla Records played at the San Isidro Festival in Madrid, attended by a big audience. However, riots almost erupted between the police and the fans. La Polla Records began to stage performances on their own, but one of them ended up in an incident in which Txarly was seriously injured, forcing the band to play with just one guitar until early 1988. In 1987, under their own label, Txaca Records, they released No somos nada, but did not come in for good reviews. Following this release, La Polla got back to record label Oihuka with Donde se habla to critical and public acclaim (1988), boosting their sales again. In 1989 their first live LP album ensued, En directo, to celebrate the band's 10th Anniversary.

=== 1990–1994: International tours, new successes and lawsuit ===
The 1990s began with a new album: Ellos dicen mierda, nosotros amén ("They say shit, we say Amen") in 1990, which was played in Europe and Latin America for the first time, in Mexico as the only leg. At year-end, released Los jubilados, and in 1991 the second EP Barman. In 1992, published the seventh album Negro, although was roughly divided among the fans, and Hoy es el futuro ("Today is the Future") in 1993, which was better received, and toured by Argentina, Chile, and Uruguay.

In 1994 the band was sued by Ángel, a former band sound engineer since 1991, and then a tribunal forbade their use of the name La Polla Records. The band ignored the sentence and released Bajo presión under the forbidden name.

=== 1996–2001: New name, 20th anniversary and Bocas ===
In 1996, however, they changed their name and simply became La Polla, receiving a new contract with GOR Records. Under this new name released Carne para la picadora. A new world tour by Europe and South America, followed a new live album La Polla en tu recto, released in 1998 and the last made by GOR label. In 1999, they celebrated their 20th anniversary recording Toda la puta vida igual, published by Maldito Records. Shortly after, Txarly left the band in January 2000, due to health problems, replaced by Jokin, a former member of M.C.D. This new line-up released Bocas in 2001, with another extended world tour.

=== 2002–2003: Death of Fernandito, reformation and break-up ===
In 2002, La Polla were still actively playing when, quite suddenly, Fernandito died of a heart attack on September 3. The band cancelled the remaining concerts of the tour. After the loss of their drummer, Jokin was fired and the vacancy was completed with Txiki and Tripi on guitar and drums respectively. After some shows in 2003, including the Viña Rock, they released their last album: El último (el) de la Polla (literally, "La Polla's last") on 3 August of that same year, and with the release of this CD, it was published by the official separation of the group. After the split, Evaristo released a book named "Por los Hijos lo que sea" where he told stories and anecdotes that told many of the same messages as his songs. Then, Evaristo founded Gatillazo in 2005, with Txiki, Tripi (his former band-mates)and Xabi (former RIP bass guitar) and continued performing and recording new material since.

== Legacy ==
La Polla Records was one of the first punk bands to sing in Spanish. They, along with dozens of other bands were part of an underground movement that existed throughout the 1980s in Spain, particularly in the Basque Country, quite distinct from the rising bands in Madrid. While the latter put an accent on innovative aesthetics and manners, the Basque brand of alternative rock showed an in-your-face stage attitude and no-holds-barred lyrics, including blunt social and political views. It came as a reaction first to the end of Francisco Franco's dictatorship in Spain (1975), and then as an outlet to vent frustration at the limitations of the democratic transition. The brand of DIY rock music developing in the Basque Country during this period came to be known as "Rock Radical Vasco" (Basque Radical Rock). La Polla Records would share this stage with many other influential bands from the Basque Country as Eskorbuto, Kortatu, RIP, Barricada, and many others. The ska-punk band Ska-P cites La Polla Records as one of their primary influences.

== Members ==
Core members

- Evaristo – vocals (1979–2003) (2019–present)
- Sumé – rhythm guitar, backing vocals (1979–2003)
- Txarly – lead guitar, backing vocals (1979–2000)
- Fernandito – drums (1979–2002)
- Abel – bass guitar (1985–2003) (2019–present)

Other members

- Maleguin – bass guitar (1979–1985)
- Jokin – lead guitar (2000–2002)
- "Tripi" – drums (2002–2003)
- "Txiki" – lead guitar (2002–2003)

== Discography ==
=== Studio albums ===
- Salve (1984)
- Revolución (1985)
- No somos nada (1987)
- Donde se habla (1988)
- Ellos dicen mierda, nosotros amén (1990)
- Los jubilados (1990)
- Negro (1992)
- Hoy es el futuro (1993)
- Bajo presión (1994)
- Carne para la picadora (1996)
- Toda la puta vida igual (1999)
- Bocas (2001)
- El último (el) de La Polla (2003)

=== Re-recordings ===
- Ni descanso, ni paz! (2019)

=== Extended plays ===
- Y ahora qué? (1983)
- Barman (1991)

=== Demos ===
- Banco Vaticano (demo, 1981)

=== Live albums ===
- En directo (1988)
- En tu recto (1998)
- Vamos entrando (2005)

=== DVD ===
- Vamos entrando (2004)

=== Compilations ===
- Volumen 1
- Volumen 2
- Volumen 3
- Volumen 4
- 14 años de La Polla (1996)
