= Piperrak =

Spanish punk band

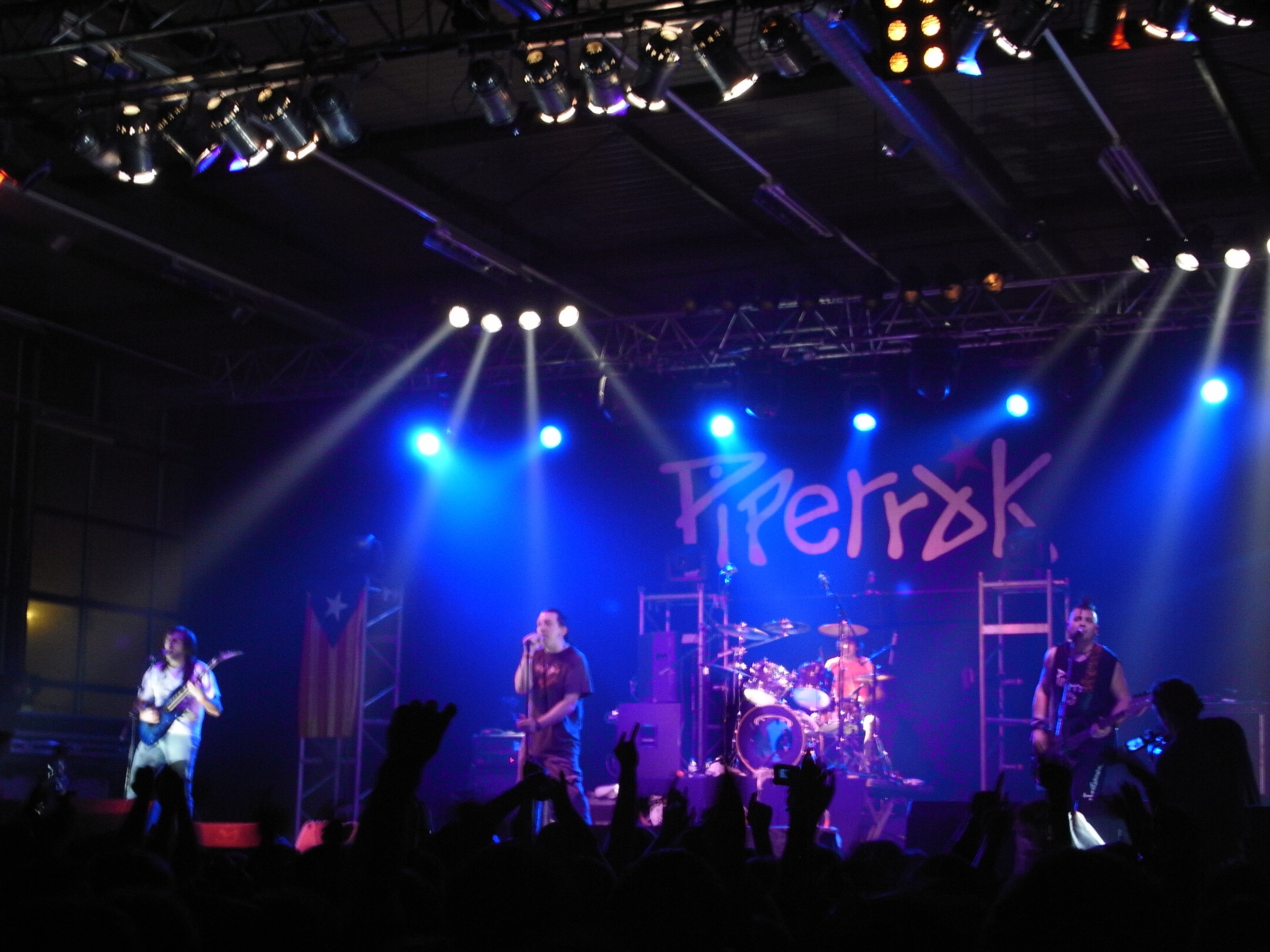
- Piperrak in a concert in Durango, Biscay

Background information
- Origin: Navarre and La Rioja
- Genres: Punk rock
- Years active: 1990–1998/2007–2010
- Labels: Discos Suicidas; Piperrak Produzioak
- Members: Josetxu; Txitxarro; Rufo; Fermín/Jabitxo
- Past members: Javi
- Website: piperrak.org

Piperrak was a Spanish punk band from La Ribera (Southern Navarre and Northern La Rioja). The band started in 1990. They recorded two demos between 1990 and 1992, and two albums between 1994 and 1996, getting a certain transcendence in the Spanish punk scene. In 1997, there was a change of guitar when Javi joined the band. The name comes from the horticultural tradition of his area as "Piperrak" means "peppers" in Basque language. The band had a temporary withdrawal from November 1998 until January 2007. The band disbanded in 2010.

== Members ==
- Rufo: drums.
- Txitxarro: bass and chorus.
- Josetxu: vocals.
- Fermín: guitar and chorus.

== Discography ==
- Ahórkate (demo). 1990.
- La ribera R'N'R (demo). 1992.
- Arde Ribera. Discos Suicidas, 1994.
- Los Muertos de Siempre. Discos Suicidas, 1996.
- Kualkier día (Live DVD). GOR Discos, 2003.
- La Kemos Liau (Live disc + DVD). Piperrak Produzioak, 2008.
