= Gatillazo =

Spanish punk band

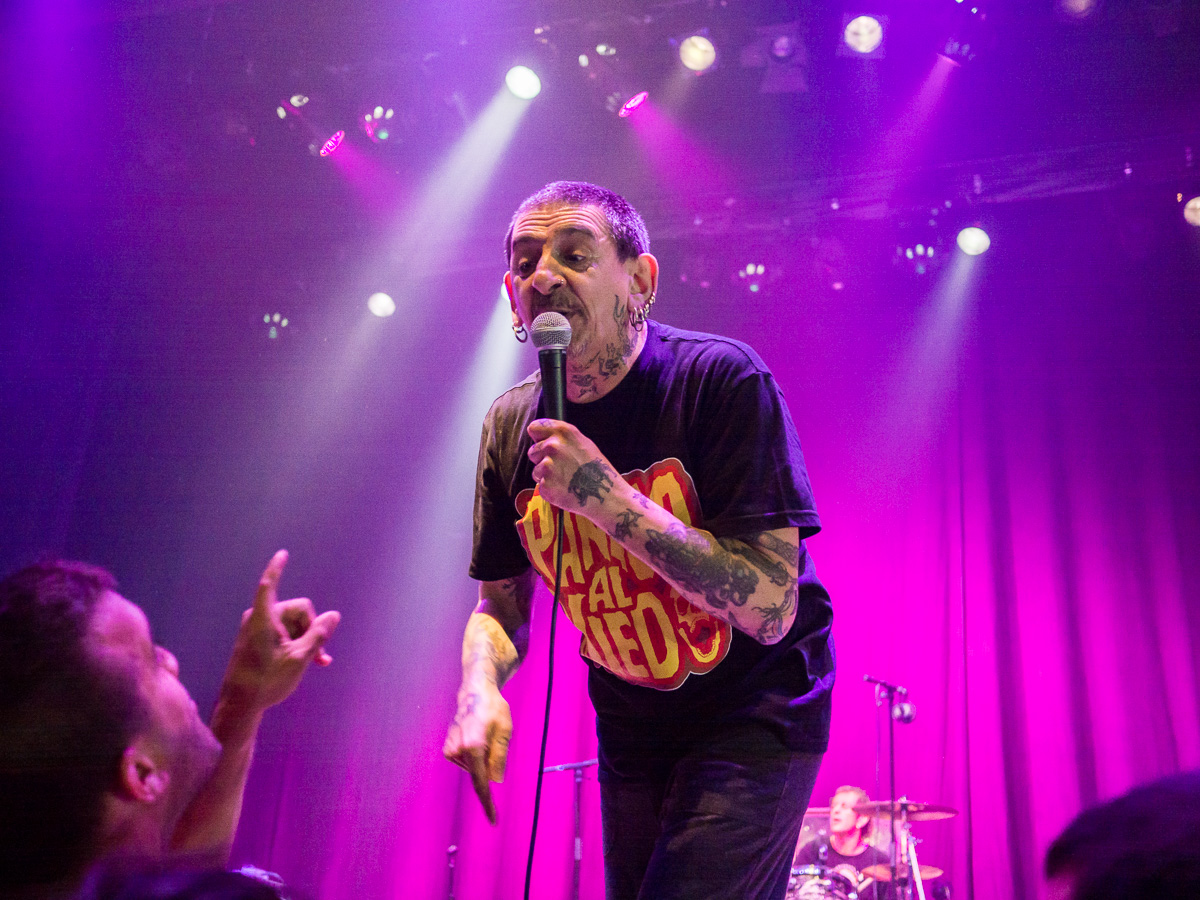
- Gatillazo performing in Zaragoza in 2016

Background information
- Origin: Basque Country (Basque Country (autonomous community))
- Genres: Punk rock Hardcore punk
- Years active: 2005–present
- Labels: Oihuka; Entzun; Santo Grial; Maldito Records
- Members: Evaristo; Txiki; Angel; Butonbiko; Tripi
- Website: www.gatillazo.com

Gatillazo is a Spanish punk band formed in the Basque Country in 2005 by former La Polla Records singer Evaristo Páramos.

== Background ==
After La Polla Records disbanded in 2003, Evaristo formed the band The Kagas with other musicians of the Basque punk scene. After releasing one album, the band was reformed as The Meas in 2004, and released one album as well. In 2005, Evaristo created Gatillazo with former members of La Polla, the guitarist Txiki, the drummer Tripi and other punk musicians from Spain.

In 2005, the band released their debut album on the Oihuka label, although it did not sell as well. Then, in 2007, the band released Dianas Legales, which was Gatillazo's most successful album, toured through Europe and Latin America between 2007 and 2008.

Then in 2008, Gatillazo released their third studio album, Sex Pastels, with a DVD by a jam session, with songs from La Polla Records, The Kagas and own songs.

On April 2, 2013, the band's fifth album Siglo XXI was released.

== Members ==
Current Line-Up

- Evaristo Páramos – vocals (2005-)
- Txiki – guitar (2005-)
- Tripi - drums (2005-)
- Butonbiko - bass (2008-)
- Angel – guitar (2009-)

Former members

- Osoron – guitar (2005–2008)
- Xabi – bass (2005–2006)
- Mikel – bass (2006–2008)

== Discography ==
- Gatillazo (2005)
- Dianas Legales (2007)
- Sex Pastels (2008) CD+DVD
- Sangre y Mierda (2011)
- Siglo XXI (2013)
- Cómo Convertirse en Nada (2016)
