= Barricada =

Spanish hard rock

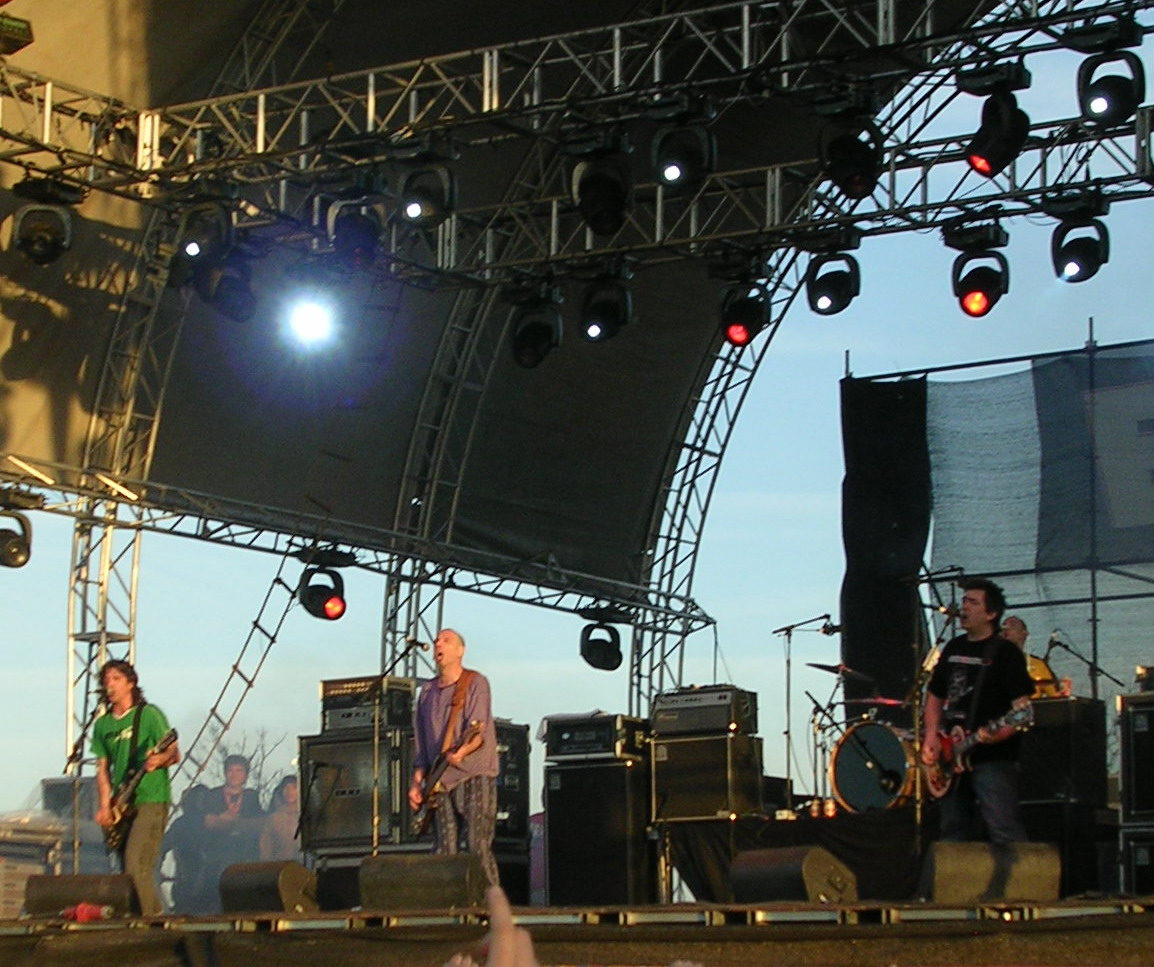
- Barricada at Extremusika festival in 2006

Background information
- Origin: Pamplona/Iruñea
- Genres: Hard rock, heavy metal, punk rock
- Years active: 1982–2013
- Labels: Soñua (1983–1985); BMG Ariola (1986); Polygram (1987–1997); Dro East West (2000–present)
- Members: Enrique Villarreal, El Drogas; Javier Hernández, El Boni; Alfredo Piedrafita; Ibon Sagarra, Ibi
- Website: www.barricada.es

Barricada (from Spanish: Barricade) were a Spanish hard rock band created in 1982 in the Txantrea neighbourhood of Pamplona/Iruñea.

The band members were Enrique Villareal (El Drogas) as bassist and vocalist, Javier Hernandez (Boni) guitarist and vocalist, Alfredo Piedrafita as guitarist and Ibon Sagarra (Ibi) on drums. Together they have written over 100 songs and sold over a million discs.

On January 8, 2021, Boni died at age 58 of laryngeal cancer.

== Discography ==
Year	Album	Notes
1983	Noche de Rock&Roll	
1985	Barrio conflictivo	
1986	No hay tregua	
1987	No sé qué hacer contigo	
1988	Rojo	
1989	Pasión por el ruido	
1990	Barricada	Live, Gold disc
1990	Barricada 83–85	
1991	Por instinto	Platinum disc
1992	Balas blancas	Platinum disc
1994	La araña	Gold disc
1995	Los singles	
1996	Insolencia	
1997	Salud y rocanrol	Live
2000	Acción directa	
2002	Bésame	
2004	Hombre mate hombre	
2006	Latidos y mordiscos	Live
2008	25 años de rocanrol	2 CD + 2 DVD
2008	Otra noche sin dormir	CD + 2 DVD, feat Rosendo & Aurora Beltrán, Gold disc
2009	La tierra está sorda	CD + Book
2012	Flechas cardinales	CD
2014	Agur: Pabellón Anaitasuna - Pamplona 23/11/13	CD
