= Por la Boca Vive el Pez =

Studio album by Fito & Fitipaldis
- Released: 11 September 2006
- Recorded: 3 June 2005–7 July 2006
- Genre: Rock; rockabilly; blues rock
- Language: Spanish
- Label: DRO

Fito & Fitipaldis chronology
Vivo...Para Contarlo (2004)	Por la Boca Vive el Pez (2006)	Dos Son Multitud (2008)

Singles from Por la Boca Vive el Pez
- 1. "Por la boca vive el pez" Released: 2006; 2. "Me equivocaría otra vez" Released: 2007; 3. "Acabo de llegar" Released: 2007

Por la Boca Vive el Pez (English: The Fish Lives Through Its Mouth) is the fourth studio album by Spanish rock band Fito & Fitipaldis, released by DRO on 11 September 2006. Produced by Joe Blaney and Carlos Raya, it was recorded at Music Lan Studios in Aviñonet de Puigventós in Girona. The album's title came from a phrase in a book, reinterpreting the saying "the fish dies by its mouth" as a metaphor for the artist's experience.

== Background ==
After the huge success of the band's previous album, Lo Más Lejos a Tu Lado (2003), lead singer Fito Cabrales went through a period of creative block. After three years without releasing any new material, he returned to songwriting with renewed energy; the result was Por la Boca Vive el Pez, in which he sought "a change" of studio, producing, and sound.

The album includes an eclectic mix of genres, including rock with touches of swing, blues, soul, and pop, maintaining Fito's characteristic introspective lyrics.

Notable songs include the album's title track, "Por la boca vive el pez", "Me equivocaría otra vez" ("I would make the same mistake again"), and "Acabo de llegar" ("I just arrived"), whose atmosphere is sometimes reminiscent of the classic rock and roll of Fito's early days.

It also includes covers of songs by other artists, featuring "Deltoya" by Extremoduro and "Abrazado a la tristeza" by Extrechinato y Tú, highlighting Fito's ties to the contemporary Spanish rock scene.

The recording of Por la boca vive el pez took place at Music Lan Studios (Aviñonet de Puigventós, Girona) under the production of Joe Blaney and bandmate Carlos Raya. This process was "old school": the band played live together in the studio, in an atmosphere of "total relaxation and complicity", according to Fito.

== Commercial performance ==
Por la boca vive el pez was a sales success. It debuted on the Spanish weekly album charts as the best-selling album in Spain, achieving Platinum status (more than 80,000 copies at that time) in just one week. After a few weeks, it sold almost 200,000 copies.

According to Promusicae, in the 2007 annual balance sheet, the album ranked among the five best-selling albums in Spain, being one of the few Spanish works to exceed 100,000 units that year. In 2010, the band achieved their most recent certification of seven times Platinum in Spain.

== Tour ==
To promote the album, Fito & Fitipaldis embarked on an extensive tour entitled "Por la boca vive la gira" ("The tour lives through the mouth"), which ran from late 2006 to 2007. The tour included more than 90 concerts in various cities in Spain and Latin America, attracting nearly a million spectators. During the summer of 2007, Fito & Fitipaldis also performed the mini-tour Dos Son Multitud in collaboration with Argentine rock musician Andrés Calamaro, playing songs by both artists (the concert was recorded on a CD and DVD in 2008). The quality of the tour was later recognized: in 2008, the Spanish Music Academy awarded the tour the "Best Tour of 2007" prize.

== Critical reception ==
Professional ratings
Review scores
Source	Rating
Allmusic	4/5 stars

Por la boca vive el pez has received positive reviews. According to Allmusic, the album is certainly one of the most accomplished collections of pop/rock songs to come out of Spain in recent times. Los 40 highlighted that Por la boca vive el pez was the band's "definitive consecration", with reviews describing it as a "resounding success", "the rock album par excellence", and "a milestone for the band". Likewise, El País highlighted its strength in live performances, noting that the concerts on the album sounded "agile and complete" and explained the enormous success of the fall of 2006.

== Track listing ==
No.	Title	Length
1.	"Por la boca vive el pez"	4:30
2.	"Me equivocaría otra vez"	5:06
3.	"Como pollo sin cabeza"	4:11
4.	"Sobra la luz"	3:36
5.	"Viene y va"	4:35
6.	"214 Sullivan Street"	2:15
7.	"Donde todo empieza"	5:33
8.	"Deltoya (Extremoduro cover)"	2:26
9.	"Acabo de llegar"	6:16
10.	"No soy Bo Diddley"	3:50
11.	"Medalla de cartón"	5:20
12.	"Esta noche"	4:04
13.	"Abrazado a la tristeza (Extrechinato y Tú cover)"	3:26

== Personnel ==
- Adolfo "Fito" Cabrales – lead vocals, acoustic and electric guitar
- Carlos Raya – electric guitar, slide guitar, pedal steel guitar
- Javier Alzola – saxophone
- José "El niño" Bruno – drums
- Roberto "Candy" Caramelo – bass and backing vocals
- Joserra Senperena – Hammond organ
- Luis Pardo - piano

== Chart performance ==
Chart (2006)	Peak position
Spanish Albums Chart	1

== Certifications ==
Region	Certification	Certified units/sales
Spain (PROMUSICAE)	7× Platinum	560,000^{^}
^{^} Shipments figures based on certification alone.
