= Décima Víctima =

Post-punk band

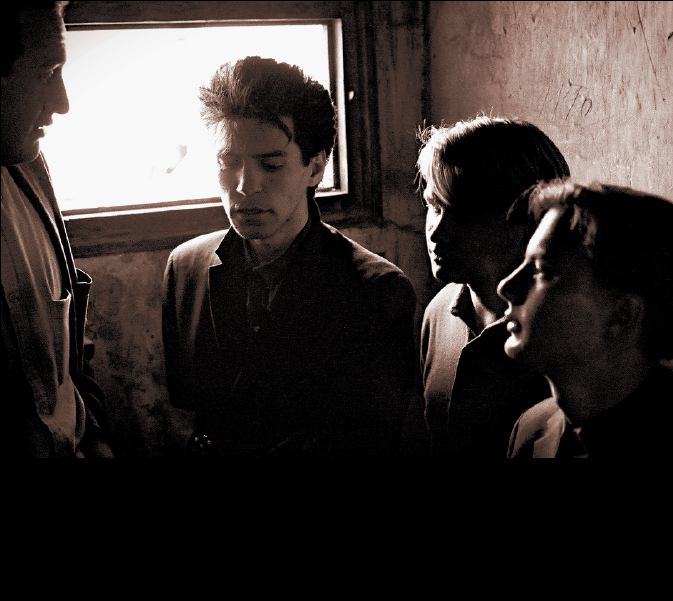

Background information
- Origin: Madrid, Spain
- Genres: Post-punk
- Years active: 1981-1984
- Labels: Grabaciones Accidentales, DRO, Munster Records
- Past members: Carlos Entrena; Lars Mertanen; Per Mertanen; José Brena
- Website: www.decimavictima.com

Decima Victima (English: Tenth Victim) was a band formed by two Swedes and two Spaniards. During their short career between 1981 and 1984, they released two LPs, a maxisingle, two EPs and three singles.

== History ==
=== Early years ===
In 1981, brothers Lars and Per Mertanen formed the instrumental duo Cláusula Tenebrosa. After a show, they started talking about the possibility of rehearsing with Carlos Entrena, a friend at the time and ex-singer of the recently split Ejecutivos Agresivos.

In 1981, with some friends, they started the independent label Grabaciones Accidentales (GASA), so they could release their own records.

=== Quartet ===
In 1982, they decided to replace the drum machine by real drums and Jose Brena joined the band.

'Tan Lejos' was so well received by the radio that months later Décima Víctima won The Maqueta de Oro (Golden Demo), an award voted by the listeners of Radio 3 (Radio Nacional de España, Spain's National Public Broadcaster), as one of the favourite tracks of 1982.

=== The End ===
The band ended mainly for work reasons beyond their control. There were no musical or personal differences.

Their last show was at Madrid's Rock-Ola on December 3, 1983.

In the winter of 1983, Décima Víctima recorded live, on a 4-track, a demo for their second Lp, 'Un Hombre Solo'. A few months later, already disbanded, they recorded it in the studio.

== Discography ==
Studio albums

- 1982: Décima Víctima LP
- 1984: Un Hombre Solo LP

Maxis, EPs and singles

- 1982: El Vacío EP
- 1982: Tan Lejos EP
- 1982: Detrás de la Mirada Single
- 1983: Algo en Común Maxisingle
- 1983: Un lugar en el Pasado Single
- 1984: Un Hombre Solo Single

Compilation albums

- 1994: Resumen CD
- 2010: Décima Víctima Box Set which includes their two LPs, an LP with the singles and demos and a booklet with the group's history, rare photos and lyrics.

== Band members ==
- Carlos Entrena (Vocals)
- Lars Mertanen (Guitar)
- Per Mertanen (Bass)
- José Brena (Drums)
