= Fitografía =

Compilation album by Fito & Fitipaldis
- Released: 10 November 2017
- Genre: Rock and roll; pop rock; alternative rock; blues rock
- Label: Warner Music
- Producer: Various

Fito & Fitipaldis chronology
Huyendo conmigo de mí (2014)	Fitografía (2017)	Cada vez Cadáver (2021)

Fitografía (English: Fitography) is a compilation album by Spanish rock band Fito & Fitipaldis, released on 10 November 2017. This album celebrates the 20-year career of the band, led by singer and guitarist Fito Cabrales, and includes a selection of their most iconic songs, as well as live versions and special collaborations.

== Background ==
Fito & Fitipaldis, formed by Fito Cabrales in 1997 after the breakup of his last band Platero y Tú, have been one of the most influential bands in contemporary Spanish rock. Their style blends rock, blues, soul, and swing, and is notable for its introspective lyrics and catchy melodies. To mark their two decades in music, the band decided to release Fitografía, a retrospective of their career.

== Release ==
"Fitografía" was released on 10 November 2017, to commemorate Fito & Fitipaldis' 20-year career. This compilation is a special edition that includes the following:

- 3 CDs:
  - CD 1 and CD 2: A selection of the band's most representative hits, personally chosen by Fito Cabrales.
  - CD 3: Collaborations with various artists and friends who have accompanied Fito throughout his career.
- 2 DVDs:
  - All of the band's official music videos.
  - Live footage, unreleased moments, and a documentary that traces the career of Fito & Fitipaldis.
- 88-page book: Contains unreleased photographs and texts by musician friends and journalists paying tribute to Fito. Contributors include Carlos Tarque, Quique González, El Drogas, Kutxi Romero, Dani Martín, Andrés Calamaro, and Ovidi from Los Zigarros.
- 8 drink coasters: Featuring the covers of the band's albums.

== Tour ==
To celebrate two decades of music, Fito & Fitipaldis embarked on their "20 años, 20 ciudades" ("20 Years, 20 Cities") tour in 2018. The tour began on 10 March 2018, at the Palacio de Deportes de Santander and continued until June of the same year, visiting 19 Spanish cities and then officially concluded on 18 September in London, England, at the Royal Albert Hall. At each concert, Fito invited different artists and friends to share the stage, offering unique and memorable performances. Spanish artist Muchachito was in charge of opening the concerts in the style of a one-man band, bringing his energy and charisma to the start of each night.

== Track listing ==
- CD 1:
1. Entre dos mares (Platero y Tú cover)
2. Por la boca vive el pez
3. Me equivocaría otra vez
4. Viene y va
5. Donde todo empieza
6. Deltoya (Extremoduro cover)
7. Acabo de llegar
8. Medalla de cartón
9. Antes de que cuente diez
10. Me acordé de ti
11. Tarde o temprano
12. Todo a cien
13. Entre la espada y la pared
14. Lo que sobra de mi
15. Pájaros disecados
16. Garabatos
17. Nos ocupamos del mar
- CD 2:
1. Rojitas las orejas
2. Trozos de cristal
3. Mirando al cielo
4. Ojos de serpiente
5. Al mar
6. Para toda la vida
7. A la luna se le ve el ombligo
8. La casa por el tejado
9. Un buen castigo
10. Soldadito marinero
11. Feo
12. Siempre estoy soñando
13. Whisky barato
14. Los huesos de los besos
15. Cerca de las vías
- CD 3:
1. Baile de ilusiones (with Ariel Rot)
2. Tipo normal (with Roberto "Candy" Caramelo)
3. Pan duro (with Marea)
4. Callejón sin salida (Tribute to Barricada)
5. La negra flor (Tribute to Radio Futura)
6. La fiesta (with Amparanoia)
7. Me quedo aquí (with Fetén Fetén)
8. Sixteen con (with Leiva and Carlos Tarque)
9. Puerto presente (with Macaco)
10. Sueños de papel (with La Fuga)
11. Mis amigos (with Flying Rebollos)
12. Luché contra la ley (with Loquillo and Trogloditas)
13. Urepel (with Gatibu)
14. En nombre de la vida (with Pedro Guerra and Amparanoia)
15. Mi trozo de cielo (with Rosana)
16. Si el cielo está gris (with Extrechinato y Tú)
17. A los ojos (with Andrés Calamaro)
18. Carolina (with M Clan)
19. Nada sin ti (with El Drogas)
20. Flojos de pantalón (con Rosendo Mercado)
21. Quiero beber hasta perder el control (with Los Secretos)

== Chart performance ==
=== Weekly charts ===
Chart (2017)	Peak position
Spanish Albums Chart	2

=== Year-end charts ===
Chart (2017)	Position
Spanish Albums Chart	14

== Certifications ==
Region	Certification	Certified units/sales
Spain (PROMUSICAE)	Platinum	40,000^{‡}
^{‡} Sales+streaming figures based on certification alone.
