= Antes de que Cuente Diez =

Studio album by Fito & Fitipaldis
- Released: 15 September 2009
- Genre: Rock
- Label: DRO

Fito & Fitipaldis chronology
Dos Son Multitud (2008)	Antes de que Cuente Diez (2009)	En directo desde el Teatro Arriaga (2014)

Singles from Antes de que Cuente Diez
- 1. "Antes de que cuente diez" Released: 2009; 2. "Los huesos de los besos" Released: 2010; 3. "Me acordé de ti" Released: 2010; 4. "Tarde o temprano" Released: 2010

Antes de que Cuente Diez (English: Before I Count to Ten) is the fifth studio album by Spanish rock band Fito & Fitipaldis, released by DRO on 15 September 2009. It was recorded in June 2009 at Du Manoir Studios in Landes in southern France, and was mixed at Avatar Studios in New York under the production of Joe Blaney, and mastered by Bob Ludwig at Gateway Mastering in Portland, Maine. It includes a cover of "Todo A Cien", a song by La Cabra Mecánica.

The album was presented on a tour in which La Cabra Mecánica performed as the opening act, marking their farewell tour after 15 years of playing together.

== Reception ==
Professional ratings
Review scores
Source	Rating
Allmusic	3.5/5 stars

According to Allmusic, Antes de que Cuente Diez is indisputably an accomplished record, but it is also content with repeating a by-now familiar formula.

== Track listing ==
No.	Title	Length
1.	"Antes de Que Cuente Diez"	4:44
2.	"Me acordé de ti"	4:07
3.	"Tarde o temprano"	5:04
4.	"Catorce vidas son dos gatos"	6:27
5.	"Todo a cien (La Cabra Mecánica cover)"	3:51
6.	"Los huesos de los besos"	4:31
7.	"Que me arrastre el viento"	4:30
8.	"Qué necesario es el rock & roll"	5:30
9.	"Conozco un lugar"	4:04
10.	"La cuisine de Bernard"	4:42

== Personnel ==
- Adolfo "Fito" Cabrales – lead vocals, acoustic and electric guitar
- Carlos Raya – electric guitar, slide guitar, pedal steel guitar, backing vocals
- Javier Alzola – saxophone
- Joserra Semperena – Hammond organ, keyboards
- Pete Thomas – drums
- Andy Hess – bass guitar

== Chart performance ==
Chart (2009)	Peak position
Spanish Album Charts	1

== Certifications ==
Region	Certification	Certified units/sales
Spain (PROMUSICAE)	3× Platinum	180,000^{^}
^{^} Shipments figures based on certification alone.
