= Duncan Dhu =

Spanish band

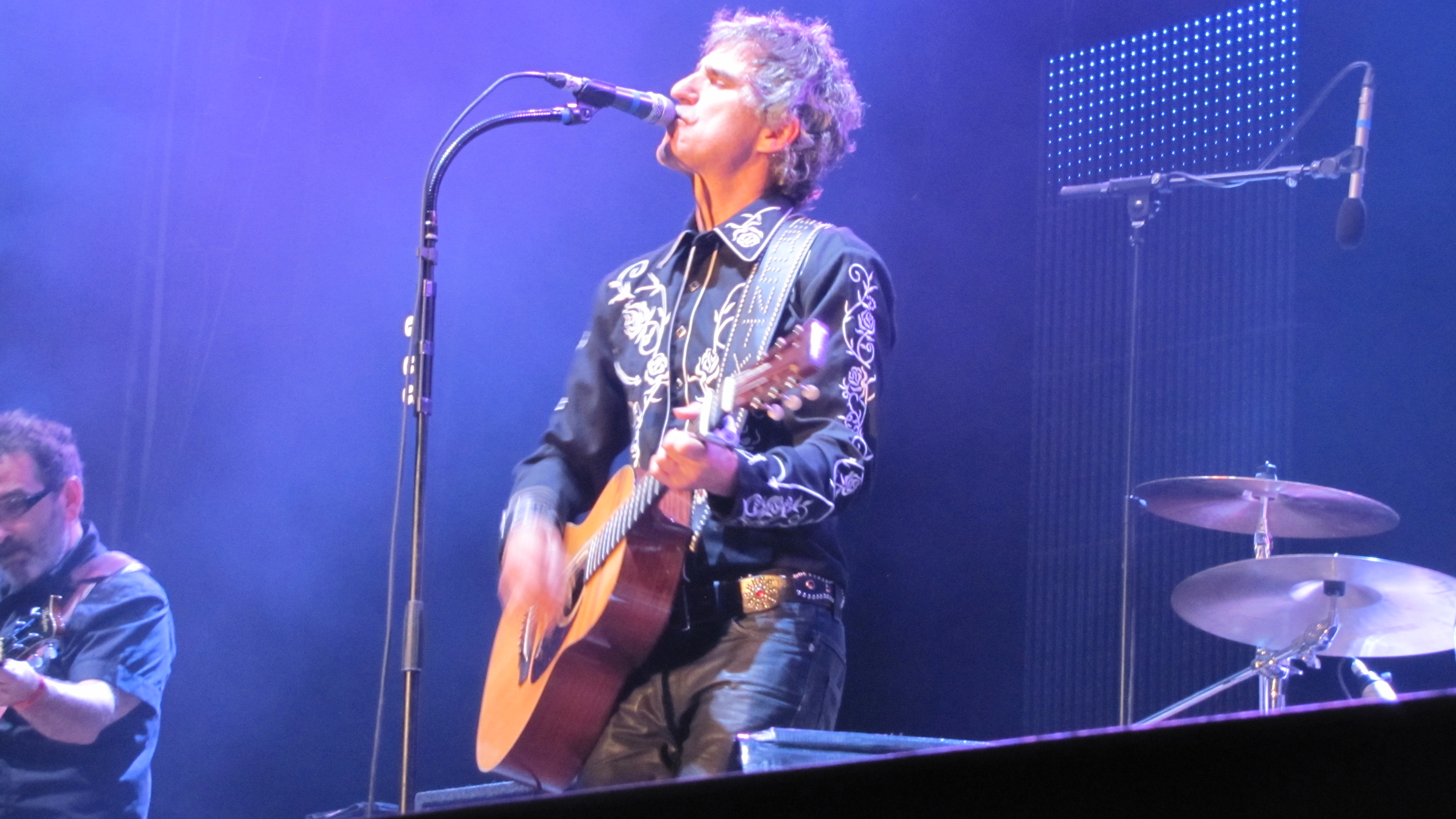
- Vocalist Mikel Erentxun performing with Duncan Dhu, August 2014.

Background information
- Origin: San Sebastián, Gipuzkoa, Spain
- Genres: Rock en español rockabilly; soft rock; pop rock
- Years active: 1984–2001, 2013–2016
- Labels: GASA; DRO Records; Warner
- Past members: Mikel Erentxun; Diego Vasallo; Juan Ramón Viles

Duncan Dhu was a Spanish group created in San Sebastián, Spain in 1984. Its original members were Mikel Erentxun (former singer in "Aristogatos"), Diego Vasallo and Juan Ramón Viles (former members of "Los Dalton"). Nowadays, it mainly consists of Mikel and Diego.

== History ==
The group's style was based on an acoustic and simple pop-rock with a touch of rockabilly in great contrast with the more radical rock played in the area at the time. After being signed by Grabaciones Accidentales, S.A. they contributed with two songs ("Mi Amor" and "Bésame Mucho") to the new bands compilation La única alternativa (The Only Alternative).

In 1985 the group recorded its first album, Por Tierras Escocesas (Around Scottish Lands), and Canciones (Songs) a year later, both produced by Paco Trinidad. The songs were immediately successful and gave the group big popularity. After even more successful El Grito del Tiempo (Cry for our Times, 1987) and Grabaciones Olvidadas (Forgotten Recordings, a compilation of B-Sides, 1989) it became a duo and recorded the double album Autobiografía (Autobiography), with collaborations by Black and Sam Brown among others. The album was nominated for a Grammy Award for Best Latin Performance in 1991. The group later also had several hits such as Esos Ojos Negros ("Those Black Eyes"). The group finally ceased to exist as a band after the release of "Crepúsculo y Crudités" (Sunset and Crudités), which was more orchestrated and softer than its older music.

The group's most-known hit is En Algún Lugar ("In Some Place" / "Somewhere"). The song was initially featured in Canciones, but it was the remix included on El Grito del Tiempo that became widely popular.

The name Duncan Dhu comes from the book Kidnapped by Robert Louis Stevenson, in which there is a character named Duncan Dhu, who is a lover of music. "I need not say if I was pleased to see him; Mrs. Maclaren, our hostess, thought nothing good enough for such a guest; and as Duncan Dhu (which was the name of our host) had a pair of pipes in his house, and was much of a lover of music, this time of my recovery was quite a festival, and we commonly turned night into day."

== Members ==
- Mikel Erentxun – lead vocals, guitars
- Diego Vasallo – bass guitar
- Juan Ramón Viles – drums, percussion

== Discography ==
- Por Tierras Escocesas (1984)
- Canciones (1986)
- El Grito del Tiempo (1987), Cry for our Times (1987, published on Les Disques du Crépuscule, TWI 876)
- Grabaciones Olvidadas (1989)
- Autobiografía (1989)
- Supernova (1991)
- Piedras (1994)
- Teatro Victoria Eugenia (1995)
- Colección 1985-1998 (1998)
- Crepúsculo (2001)
- El Duelo (2013)
- 1 (2013)
