= En directo desde el Teatro Arriaga =

Live album by Fito & Fitipaldis
- Released: 4 March 2014
- Recorded: October 2013
- Venue: Teatro Arriaga (Bilbao, Spain)
- Genre: Rock
- Label: DRO; Warner Music Spain

Fito & Fitipaldis chronology
Antes de que Cuente Diez (2009)	En directo desde el Teatro Arriaga (2014)	Huyendo conmigo de mí (2014)

Singles from En directo desde el Teatro Arriaga
- 1. "Cerca de las vías" Released: 11 February 2014

En directo desde el Teatro Arriaga (English: Live from the Arriaga Theater) is the third live album by Spanish rock band Fito & Fitipaldis, recorded in October 2013 at the Teatro Arriaga in Bilbao, during the band's charity concert tour of theaters throughout Spain.

The album was released on 4 March 2014 by DRO and Warner Music Spain, in a digipack with two CDs and one DVD. It was also available in a special limited edition format that included 3 vinyl records with the two CDs and the DVD and in digital format.

== Track listing (CD) ==
CD1
No.	Title	Length
1.	"Por la boca vive el pez"	5:27
2.	"Sobra la luz"	4:06
3.	"Me equivocaría otra vez"	5:52
4.	"Cerca de las vías"	3:07
5.	"A la luna se le ve el ombligo"	8:55
6.	"Quiero beber hasta perder el control"	3:52
7.	"Como pollo sin cabeza"	4:52
8.	"El funeral"	5:30
9.	"Que me arrastre el viento"	5:36
10.	"Me acordé de ti"	6:52

CD2
No.	Title	Length
1.	"El ojo que me mira"	4:45
2.	"Esta noche"	6:57
3.	"La casa por el tejado"	5:20
4.	"A mil kilómetros"	4:32
5.	"Antes de que cuente diez"	6:30
6.	"Al cantar"	4:40
7.	"Soldadito marinero"	7:42
8.	"Acabo de llegar"	7:15

== Track listing (DVD) ==
1. Por la boca vive el pez
2. Sobra la luz
3. Me equivocaría otra vez
4. Cerca de las vías
5. A la luna se le ve el ombligo
6. Quiero beber hasta perder el control
7. Como pollo sin cabeza
8. 214 Sullivan Street
9. ¡Qué divertido!
10. El funeral
11. Que me arrastre el viento
12. Me acordé de ti
13. El ojo que me mira
14. Esta noche
15. La casa por el tejado
16. A mil kilómetros
17. Para toda la vida
18. Antes de que cuente diez
19. Al cantar
20. Soldadito marinero
21. Acabo de llegar

== Personnel ==
- Adolfo "Fito" Cabrales – lead vocals, acoustic and electric guitar
- Carlos Raya – electric guitar, octave mandolin, slide guitar, pedal steel guitar, backing vocals
- Javier Alzola – saxophone and clarinet
- Joserra Semperena – Hammond organ and keyboards
- Daniel Griffin – drums
- Alejandro "Boli" Climent – bass guitar

== Chart performance ==
Chart (2014)	Peak position
Spanish Album Charts	2

== Certifications ==
Region	Certification	Certified units/sales
Spain (PROMUSICAE)	Gold	20,000^{^}
^{^} Shipments figures based on certification alone.
