= Vivo...Para Contarlo =

Live album by Fito & Fitipaldis
- Released: 22 November 2004
- Recorded: 19 August 2004
- Genre: Rock
- Label: DRO

Fito & Fitipaldis chronology
| Lo Más Lejos a Tu Lado (2003) | Vivo...Para Contarlo (2004) | Por la Boca Vive el Pez (2006) |

Vivo...Para Contarlo (English: Live... to Tell) is the first live album by Spanish rock band Fito & Fitipaldis, and was released by DRO on 22 November 2004. The concert was performed 19 August 2004 in Bilbao.

== Track listing (CD) ==
| No. | Title | Length |
|---|---|---|
| 1. | "Quiero beber hasta perder el control" | 4:04 |
| 2. | "La casa por el tejado" | 4:50 |
| 3. | "Trozos de cristal" | 4:35 |
| 4. | "Barra americana" | 3:16 |
| 5. | "Un buen castigo" | 7:17 |
| 6. | "A la luna se le ve el ombligo" | 5:35 |
| 7. | "Cerca de las vías" | 2:36 |
| 8. | "Qué divertido" | 3:21 |
| 9. | "Vamonó" | 5:23 |
| 10. | "Siempre estoy soñando" | 4:10 |
| 11. | "Whisky barato" | 3:31 |
| 12. | "Para toda la vida" | 3:21 |
| 13. | "Soldadito marinero" | 7:23 |
| 14. | "Nada que decir" | 9:36 |
| 15. | "Corazón oxidado" | 10:55 |

== Track listing (DVD) ==
Live performance
| N.º | Nombre |
|---|---|
| 01 | Quiero beber hasta perder el control |
| 02 | La casa por el tejado |
| 03 | Trozos de cristal |
| 04 | Barra americana |
| 05 | Un buen castigo |
| 06 | A la luna se le ve el ombligo |
| 07 | Cerca de las vías |
| 08 | Qué divertido |
| 09 | Vamonó |
| 10 | Siempre estoy soñando |
| 11 | Whisky barato |
| 12 | Ni negro ni blanco |
| 13 | Alegría |
| 14 | Para toda la vida |
| 15 | Soldadito marinero |
| 16 | Nada que decir |
| 17 | Corazón oxidado |
MUSIC VIDEOS
| 1 | La casa por el tejado |
| 2 | Soldadito marinero |
| 3 | Siempre estoy soñando |
| 4 | Whisky barato |
| 5 | Feo |
| 6 | Para toda la vida |
| 7 | Perro viejo |
| 8 | A la luna se le ve el ombligo |
| 9 | Mirando al cielo |

== Chart performance ==
| Chart (2004) | Peak position |
|---|---|
| Spanish Albums Chart | 17 |

| Chart (2004) | Peak position |
|---|---|
| Spanish Video Chart | 3 |

== Certifications ==
| Region | Certification | Certified units/sales |
|---|---|---|
| Spain (Promusicae) | Platinum | 100,000^{^} |
^{^} Shipments figures based on certification alone.
