= Grabaciones Accidentales =

Spanish independent record label

- Parent company: Warner Music Group
- Founded: 1981
- Founder: Paco Trinidad, Esclarecidos, Décima Víctima
- Distributor: Pancoca (1982–1983)
- Genre: alternative rock
- Country of origin: Spain
- Location: Madrid

Grabaciones Accidentales, SA (English: Accidental Recordings; often abbreviated to GASA) is a Spanish independent record label founded in 1981 by Paco Trinidad with members of the bands Esclarecidos and Décima Víctima. In addition to publishing albums by the founding members, the label was responsible for releases by other Spanish artists and the distribution of releases by some foreign artists.

Along with other labels founded around the same time, such as DRO Records, Grabaciones Accidentales is considered to be one of Spain's first independent record labels.

== History ==
Grabaciones Accidentales was established in Madrid in late 1981 by members of the bands Esclarecidos and Décima Víctima. Aviador Dro's label DRO Records, with which GASA would later collaborate, was also founded around this time. Music critic Diego Manrique announced the label's establishment in the December 1981 issue of Spain's Rock Espezial magazine, explaining that the label would sign artists for one release at a time (often a single) rather than making long-term contracts. GASA is one of Spain's earliest independent record labels.

As alternative rock became more popular in Spain, Grabaciones Accidentales and other small Spanish labels presented the opportunity for independent artists, especially those based in Madrid, to release music to a wider audience.

GASA's first releases, 7-inch EPs by founding artists Esclarecidos and Décima Víctima, were issued in March 1982. In that year, the label also released EPs by Los Coyotes and Derribos Arias. The following year, GASA continued to take on new artists. However, the collapse of its original distributor, Pancoca, which had also handled distribution for other independent labels such as DRO and Tres Cipreses, caused a crisis for the label. Grabaciones Accidentales began acting as a distributor for DRO to help alleviate pressures. It was absorbed into DRO in 1984. In 1993, struggling to meet increasing demand in an unstable market, DRO was acquired by Warner.

== Notable artists ==
The following Spanish artists released music through Grabaciones Accidentales:

- Esclarecidos
- Gabinete Caligari
- Los Coyotes
- Décima Víctima
- Derribos Arias
- Loquillo
- Los Trogloditas
- Duncan Dhu

== See also ==
- List of record labels
