= La Fuga (band) =

Spanish rock band

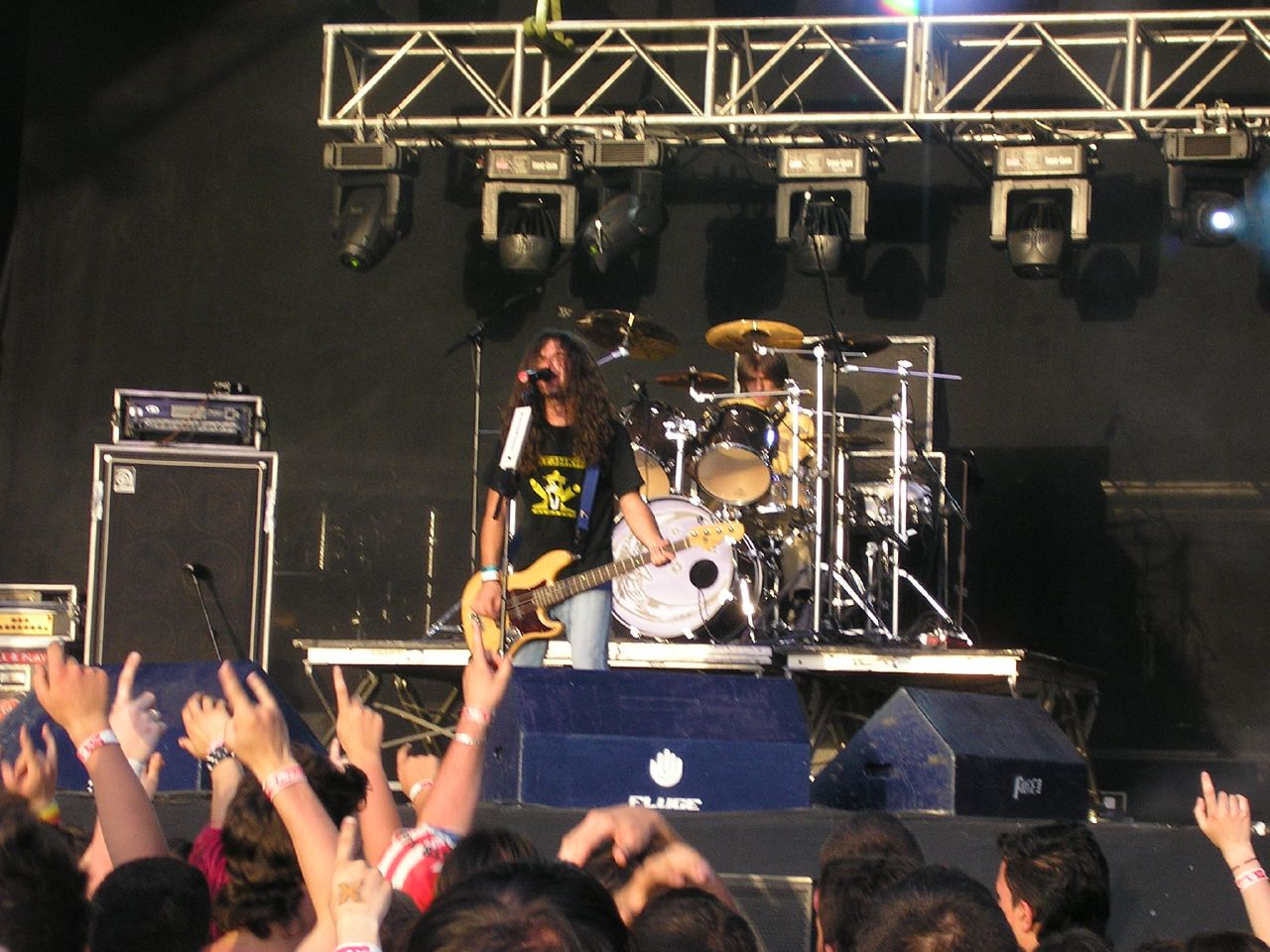
- The band performing at the Viña Rock festival in 2005

Background information
- Origin: Reinosa, Cantabria, Spain
- Years active: 1996–present
- Labels: FAK Records (1998, 2002); EDG Music (2001, 2006); Dro-Atlantic (2003-2012); Produlam (2012-)
- Members: Pedro; Nando; Raúl; Edu
- Past members: Rulo; Fito; Iñaki Durán
- Website: lafuga.net

La Fuga is a Spanish rock band from Reinosa, Cantabria that formed in the summer of 1996. It is composed by Xavi Moreno (voice and guitar), Nando (guitar), Raúl (bass) and Edu (drums). They have played more than 600 concerts over the course of ten tours, and they have published 10 albums to date.

== Formation and beginnings ==
The group started to play in 1997. In the month of September, the band, formed then by Edu (drums), Rulo (lead vocals and guitar), Fito (guitar and backing vocals) and Iñaki (bass), started to give their first concerts in Reinosa and other places of Cantabria and Palencia.

=== First disc: Mira ===
After the great success of their demo, they started playing more and more concerts in more cities out of their locality, even playing in Madrid. They gained popularity, and people began to ask for their own songs. Because of this they decided to record their first studio album called Mira, which was released in 1998.

To raise funds for the recording, they went to the city hall of Reinosa to request help. They were hired to give two concerts there in order to attain enough money to record in Navarra, in the Sonido XXI studies, with the San Martín brothers. Half of the costs of the album were paid by the members, whereas the other half was paid for by an independent seal of Santander, FAK Records.

As collaboration, José Romero, guitar tech of the band, recorded a solo in sueños.

For family and financial reasons, Fito had to leave the band. Nando joined as a guitarist to fill Fito's role, participating on the record. Thanks to this, La Fuga went on their first tour, with more than 80 concerts across Spain.

=== Un juguete por navidad ===
In 1998 Fito joined the group as a guest in a benefit concert organized by the band, which managed to fill the Teatro Municipal of Reinosa. The quartet played their own songs and covers of songs by other rock bands, such as Platero y tú, Maná or Los Suaves. The actuation was recorded for the album Un juguete por Navidad, launched as a special limited signed edition, with just 1,000 copies.

After the concert, the members of the group asked Fito to return, and he accepted. The structure of the band changed, Nando kept playing the guitar, Edu the drums, Rulo kept singing, Fito played the guitar and sang and Iñaki played the bass, but the last one left the group, this arrangement remained until 2009 when Rulo decided to leave the group followed by Fito. Shortly before releasing the album, Rulo took his role as bass, in addition to singing and playing the harmonica.

=== A golpes... de rock and roll ===
The group was still looking for a record when in the year 2000 they decided to ask for a credit to auto produce their second studio album, A golpes de Rock and Roll. In the months of March and April they also started recording in Sonido XXI, releasing the album in June, they started a tour with good results.

During the tour, the San Martín brothers (the owners of the studio) asked La Fuga to sign a contract with EDG Music, and record two albums with them, and the band agreed.

=== A las doce ===
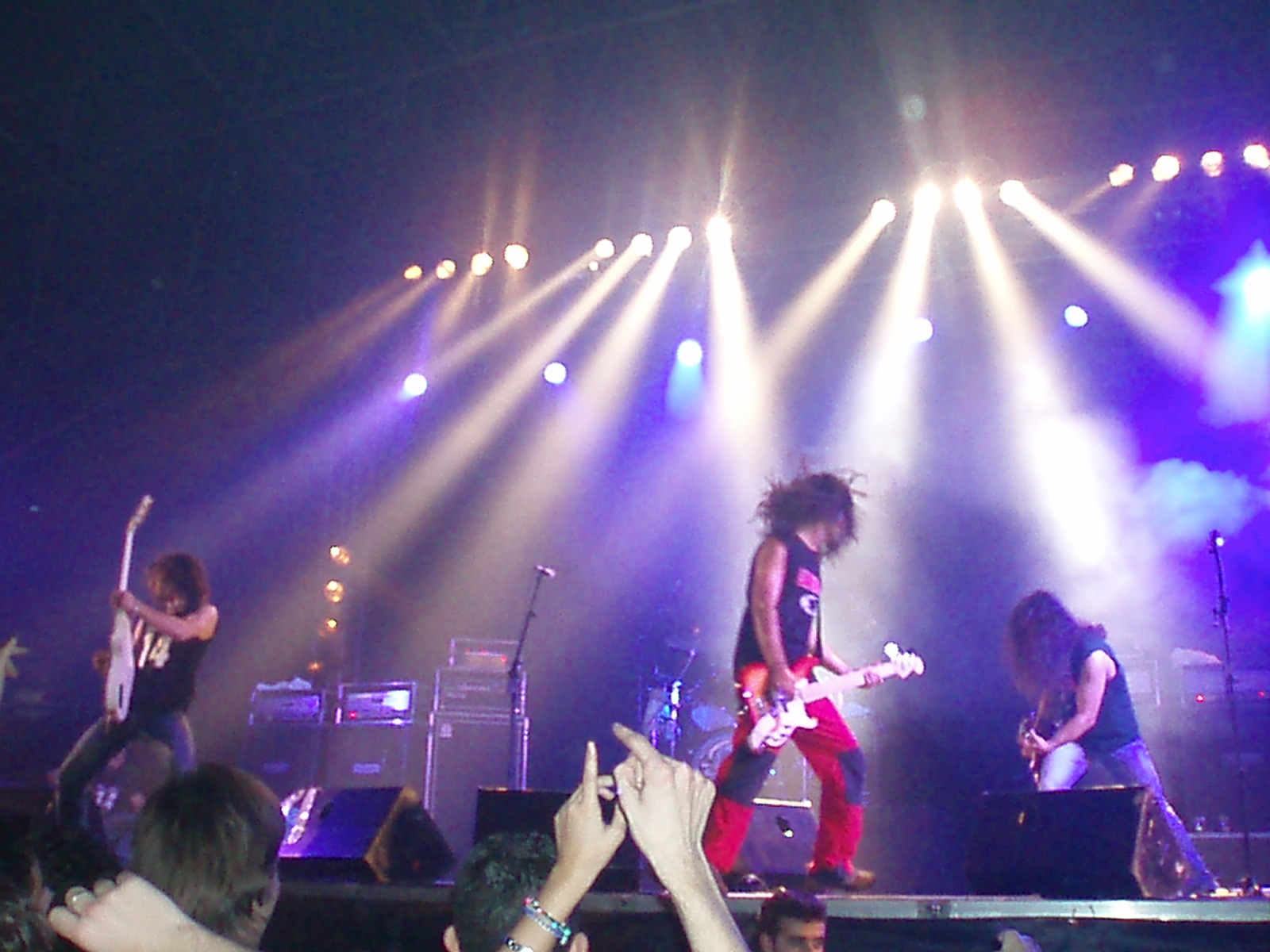
La Fuga in Salamanca.

In 2001, and after some months composing new songs and recording demos, the band went back to Navarra to record A las doce. They recorded the album in just two weeks, with better equipment than before.

The new tour was bigger than other years, with about 60 concerts, including national festivals, such as Viña Rock and Derrame Rock, where they won new fans.

Aurora Beltrán also collaborated with them on the track "Balada del despertador", and their first music videos were recorded: "Pa volar" y "Conversación, habitación".

=== Calles de papel ===
They still had not any contract with EDG to record a new studio album, when they started to receive calls from other record companies. EDG, encouraging the group to continue with their plans, did not have any problem the band signing with a multinational company Dro-Atlantic.

Calles de papel, launched in May 2003, included a video with images of the tour of 2002. The work was highlighted by the maturity of the quartet. They also recorded a video to "En vela" in Madrid. The album performed well, getting on the list of AFYVE (now Promusicae) in their first week.

On this occasion, the invited artists were Fito Cabrales, whose voice appears in "Sueños de papel", and Kutxi Romero, whose voice appears in "Los lunes de octubre".

The tour was bigger than previous, called the Calles de Papel Tour they performed 82 concerts, finishing in Las Ventas, with Fito & Fitipaldis, which was well received.

In the same year they participated in a tribute to Barricada, called Un camino de piedras: un homenaje a Barricada, contributing their version of "Pasión por el ruido". In 2004 they appeared in another tribute, this time to Radio Futura, recording a version of "37 grados".

=== Negociando gasolina ===
In April 2005 they launched Negociando gasolina, and they became more famous with the first single "Buscando en la Basura".

Contributors to the album include El Drogas, of Barricada, in "Baja por diversión", and Laura, from a group of Cantabria, who does the chorus on "Amor de contenedor".

The tour started a month after the album's release.

=== La Fuga en directo ===
After the Negociando Gasolina tour, the quartet decided to record live in the Aqualung auditorium. In two concerts, on 9 and 10 December 2005, they recorded audio and video for the DVD La Fuga en directo, which went on sale in 2006, starting with it a new tour.

=== Nubes y claros ===
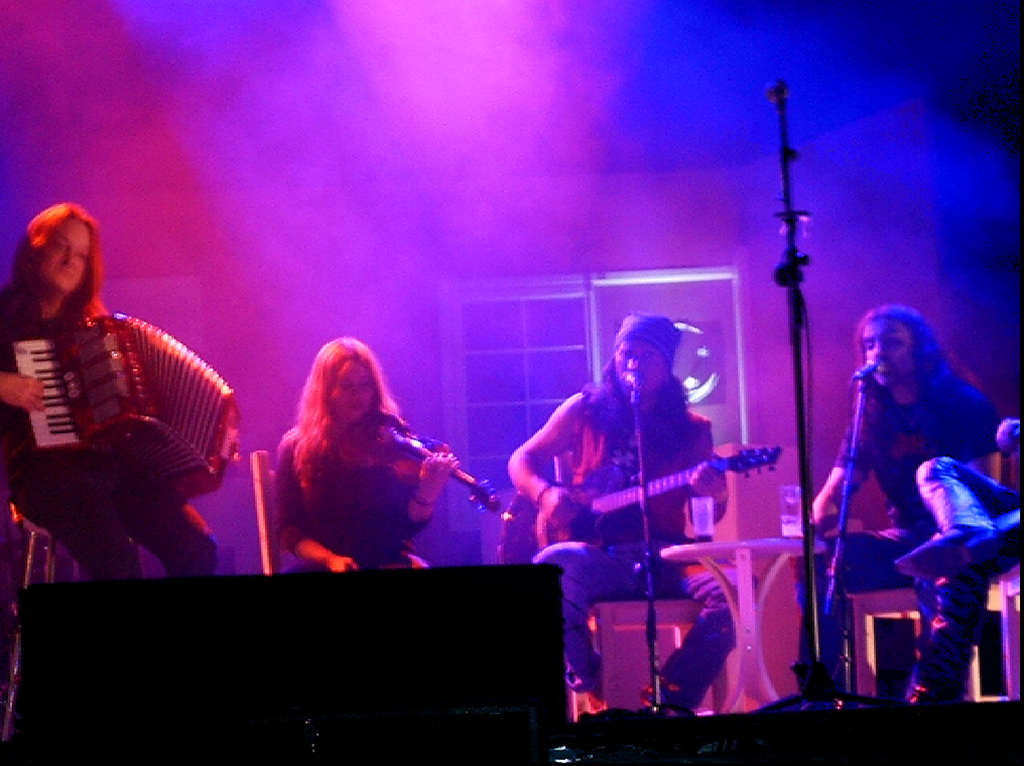
La Fuga acoustic, in Zaragoza.

The band decided to make an experiment with their old songs, making an acoustic disc called Nubes y Claros, which went on sale in 2006. They included new instruments: violins, flutes, accordions... Nando, in the reportage La Fuga: diez años defined the disc as something strange. They also did different versions of their old songs and a version of "Donde habita el olvido", of Joaquín Sabina.

They announced an acoustic mini-tour, using all the new instruments they had used in their new disc, with a special staging due to the different auditoriums in where they played.

The disc included a special DVD with videos and reportage.

For the first time in their career, they toured outside Spain. In May and September 2007, they visited Argentina, Uruguay and Chile, countries where they had a great reception and they played with the Uruguayan band La Chancha and the Argentinians Bulldog.

=== Asuntos pendientes ===
After 3 years without releasing a studio album, La Fuga announced Asuntos Pendientes, their new studio album. This time the production was bigger than anyone before, they even were title page in the magazine HeavyRock.

The disc was on a part conditioned by the tour all over South America: some songs were written during the tour, and it is seen in the lyrics the surprise of the group when they realized about the lifestyle of some of the people of the zone.

The first single, "No sólo respirar", changes the rhythm and is faster compared to their other songs.

On this tour they again played Viña Rock, and also played at the Mediatic Festival.

=== Changes ===
27 October 2009, la Fuga announced that Rulo, bassist and vocalist, was leaving the band. But the group continued doing music as always.

Later, in June 2010 Fito also left La Fuga to play with Rulo.

The separation of the band created two bands:

- In one hand Rulo and Fito created a band called Rulo y la contrabanda, headed by Raúl (Rulo).
- In the other hand, La Fuga continued, in 2010 presenting Pedro (ex—Mr. Fylyn) as the new voice and Raúl Serrano as the bassist. They released a studio album called Raíces on 8 March 2011.

=== Raíces ===
After their rupture they released a new album with their new line-up consisting out of: Pedro, Nando, Edu and Raúl.

== Band members ==
=== Current members ===
- Pedro: Lead vocals and guitar (2010–present)
- Nando: Guitar (1998–present)
- Raúl Serrano: Bass (2010–present)
- Edu: Drums (1996–present)

=== Former members ===
- Raúl Gutiérrez "Rulo" lead vocals and guitar (1996–1999); bass (1999–2009)
- Adolfo Garmendia "Fito": guitar and backing vocals (1996–1998, 1998–2010)
- Iñaki Durán (1996–1999)

== Discography ==
=== Studio albums ===
- Mira (1998).
- A golpes de Rock and Roll (2000).
- A las doce (2001).
- Calles de papel (2003).
- Negociando gasolina (2005).
- La Fuga en directo (Auditorium Aqualung of Madrid) (2006).
- Nubes y claros (Acoustic) (2006).
- Asuntos pendientes (2008).
- Raíces (2011)
- Más de cien amaneceres (2013)

=== Models ===
- El camino (1997).
- Un juguete por navidad (Limited edition) (1999).

=== DVD ===
- La Fuga en directo (Auditorium Aqualung of Madrid) (2006).

=== Collaborations ===
- 2003- "Pasión por el ruido": Collaboration in Un camino de piedras. A tribute to Barricada.
- 2004- "37 grados": Collaboration in Arde la Calle. A tribute to Radio Futura.
