= Huyendo conmigo de mí =

Studio album by Fito & Fitipaldis
- Released: 28 October 2014
- Recorded: July–September 2014
- Genre: Rock
- Language: Spanish
- Label: DRO; Warner Music Spain
- Producer: Carlos Raya

Fito & Fitipaldis chronology
En directo desde el Teatro Arriaga (2014)	Huyendo conmigo de mí (2014)	Fitografía (2017)

Singles from Huyendo conmigo de mí
- 1. "Entre la espada y la pared" Released: 18 September 2014; 2. "Lo que sobra de mí" Released: 2015; 3. "Garabatos" Released: 2015; 4. "Pájaros disecados" Released: 2015

Huyendo conmigo de mí (English: Running Away With Me From Myself) is the sixth studio album by Spanish rock band Fito & Fitipaldis, released on 28 October 2014 by DRO. The album was produced by band member Carlos Raya, and was recorded between July and September 2014.

== Track listing ==
No.	Title	Length
1.	"Entre la espada y la pared"	4:52
2.	"Lo que sobra de mí"	3:40
3.	"Pájaros disecados"	4:19
4.	"Nos ocupamos del mar (Javier Krahe cover)"	4:44
5.	"Nada de nada"	4:20
6.	"El vencido"	4:17
7.	"Garabatos"	4:40
8.	"Lo que siempre quise hacer"	4:45
9.	"Umore ona"	3:53
10.	"Después del naufragio"	4:39

== Personnel ==
=== Fito & Fitipaldis ===
- Fito Cabrales – lead vocals, electric guitar
- Carlos Raya – acoustic guitar, electric guitar, pedal steel guitar, backing vocals, producer
- Alejandro "Boli" Climent – bass guitar
- Daniel Griffin – drums
- Joserra Senperena – Hammond organ, pump organ, piano

=== Additional personnel ===
- Joe Blaney – sound engineer
- Jordi Cristau – sound engineer
- Héctor Kaz – additional producer
- Pablo Pulido – assistant engineer
- Omar Carrascosa – assistant engineer
- Tyler Hartman – mixing assistant
- Bob Ludwig – mastering engineer
- Javier Salas – photography
- José Luis Mazarlo – cover art and drawings
- Manuel Guio – design
- Manolo del Campo – harmonica
- Toni Jurado – percussion
- Josué García – trumpet
- David Carrasco – baritone saxophone

== Chart performance ==
Chart (2014)	Peak position
Spanish Album Charts	1

== Certifications ==
Region	Certification	Certified units/sales
Spain (PROMUSICAE)	3× Platinum	120,000^{^}
^{^} Shipments figures based on certification alone.
