= A Puerta Cerrada (album) =

Studio album by Fito & Fitipaldis
- Released: 16 October 1998
- Genre: Rock
- Length: 31:42
- Label: DRO
- Producer: Iñaki "Uoho" Antón and Fito Cabrales

Fito & Fitipaldis chronology
A Puerta Cerrada (1998)	Los Sueños Locos (2001)

A Puerta Cerrada (English: Behind Closed Doors) is the first studio album by Spanish rock band Fito & Fitipaldis. It was produced by Iñaki "Uoho" Antón and Fito Cabrales, and released by DRO on 16 October 1998.

== Background ==
The band's lead singer, Fito Cabrales, was the lead singer of another Spanish rock band: Platero y Tú. The album was recorded in December 1997 but its release was delayed so as not to interfere with the tour he was doing with Platero y Tú. The album is mainly acoustic, while mixing rock & roll, swing, and blues, but with a very simple and intimate sound. The recording featured Miguel Colino (bassist for Extremoduro), Txus Alday on guitars, and Polako and Arturo on drums and percussion, respectively. José Alberto Bátiz and Javier Alzola collaborated on specific tracks, and from the second album onwards they would be the guitarist and saxophonist respectively in the Fitipaldis line-up. Robe from Extremoduro and Uoho from Platero y Tú also collaborated on specific tracks.

The first track, "Rojitas las orejas", was later recorded by another musical project in which Fito participated, Extrechinato y Tú, although this time with a more rock sound, combining poet Manolo Chinato's verses with Fito's lyrics on a more powerful musical base.

== Track listing ==
No.	Title	Length
1.	"Rojitas las orejas"	3:45
2.	"Trozos de cristal (feat. Roberto Iniesta)"	3:41
3.	"Barra americana"	2:40
4.	"Mirando al cielo"	4:13
5.	"Quiero beber hasta perder el control (Los Secretos cover)"	2:55
6.	"El lobo se espanta"	3:55
7.	"¡Qué divertido!"	2:50
8.	"Trapos sucios"	3:02
9.	"Ojos de serpiente"	3:07
10.	"El funeral"	1:45

== Personnel ==
- Adolfo "Fito" Cabrales – lead vocals, guitars
- Txus Alday – guitars
- Miguel Colino – bass guitar
- Polako – drums
- Arturo – percussion, backing vocals
- Iñaki "Uoho" Antón – guitar solo on "Trozos de Cristal" and trombone in "El funeral"
- Roberto Iniesta – vocals on "Trozos de cristal"
- José Alberto Bátiz – guitar solo on "Trozos de cristal" and slide guitar on "El lobo se espanta"
- Javier Alzola – saxophone on "Ojos de serpiente"
- Mario Larrañaga – piano on "Rojitas las orejas" and "Quiero beber hasta perder el control"
- Fermin Goñi – trumpet in "Barra americana"
- Garicotx Badiola – helicon on "El funeral"

== Chart performance ==
Chart (1998)	Peak position
Spanish Albums Chart	61

== Certifications ==
Region	Certification	Certified units/sales
Spain (PROMUSICAE)	2× Platinum	200,000^{^}
^{^} Shipments figures based on certification alone.
