= Dos Son Multitud =

Live album by Fito & Fitipaldis featuring Andrés Calamaro
- Released: 25 March 2008
- Genre: Rock
- Label: DRO

Fito & Fitipaldis chronology
Por la Boca Vive el Pez (2006)	Dos Son Multitud (2008)	Antes de que Cuente Diez (2009)

Andrés Calamaro chronology
La Lengua Popular (2007)	Dos Son Multitud (2008)	On the Rock (2010)

Professional ratings
Review scores
Source	Rating
Allmusic	3/5 stars

Dos Son Multitud (English: Two Are a Crowd) is a live album, double DVD and CD by Spanish rock band Fito & Fitipaldis featuring Argentine rock musician Andrés Calamaro. It is Fito & Fitipaldis' second live album and was released by DRO on 25 March 2008. It was recorded during the first concert in Getafe, based on a tour in July 2007 (Getafe on the 7th, Benidorm on the 14th, Santiago de Compostela on the 21st, and Barcelona on the 28th).

== Track listing (CD) ==
No.	Title	Length
1.	"A los ojos"
2.	"Viene y va"
3.	"El salmón"
4.	"Lo que no existe más"
5.	"Crucifícame"
6.	"Estadio Azteca"
7.	"Por la boca vive el pez"
8.	"Me equivocaría otra vez"
9.	"Como pollo sin cabeza"
10.	"Whisky barato"
11.	"Medalla de cartón"
12.	"Alta suciedad"
13.	"Flaca"

== Track listing (DVD) ==
DVD 1
N.º	Name
01	A los ojos
02	Viene y va
03	Quiero ser una estrella
04	No se puede vivir del amor
05	El salmón
06	Crucifícame
07	Todo lo demás
08	Lo que no existe más
09	Hacer el tonto
10	Loco - Corte de Huracán
11	Días distintos
12	Las heridas
13	Crímenes perfectos
14	Flaca
15	Canal 69
16	Paloma
DVD 2
1	Por la boca vive el pez
2	A la luna se le ve el ombligo
3	Donde todo empieza
4	Me equivocaría otra vez
5	Como pollo sin cabeza
6	214 Sullivan Street
7	Cerca de las vías
8	La casa por el tejado
9	Soldadito marinero
10	Me arde
11	Whisky barato
12	Medalla de cartón
13	Alta suciedad

== Chart performance ==
Chart (2008)	Peak position
Spanish Albums Chart	2
