= Mystechs =

Mystechs (sometimes referred to as The Mystechs) is an electronic/punk music group formed in 1998 in Chicago, Illinois. The band's lineup consists of keyboardist/songwriter Emil Hyde joined by a host of other musicians and collaborators. Their music covers a wide range of genres from indie rock to new wave, hip hop and heavy metal. The Mystechs began as an electronica group, gradually incorporating other genres to their sound. Hyde says of the band, "Mystechs began as a nice, normal, female-fronted trip-hop group like Portishead or Esthero".

Formed in 1999, the Mystechs have issued CDs and DVDs on the independent Omega Point label. The CDs are 1999's Fantaseed, 2000's Dark Age Disco, 2001's Unholy Land, 2002's Showtime at the Apocalypse, 2003's City Folk, 2004's Jook Een Dah, 2005's Warriors & Warlocks, 2006's Escape From Planet Love, and 2007's Hot Tub o' Blood.

The DVDs are Legend of the Buick Brothers, Warriors & Warlocks: The Movie, and 2007's Escape From Planet Love: The Motion Picture.

The Mystechs have toured with Aviador Dro and Rick Johnson Rock N' Roll Machine, among other groups.
