= Los Sueños Locos =

Studio album by Fito & Fitipaldis
- Released: 19 October 2001
- Genre: Rock
- Label: DRO

Fito & Fitipaldis chronology
A Puerta Cerrada (1998)	Los Sueños Locos (2001)	Lo Más Lejos a Tu Lado (2003)

Los Sueños Locos (English: Crazy Dreams) is the second studio album by Spanish rock band Fito & Fitipaldis, released by DRO on 19 October 2001.

== Track listing ==
No.	Title	Length
1.	"Al mar"	6:11
2.	"Para toda la vida (Flaco Jiménez cover)"	3:15
3.	"Perro viejo"	4:31
4.	"Cerca de las vías"	3:10
5.	"A la luna se le ve el ombligo"	4:51
6.	"Ni negro ni blanco (feat. Roberto Iniesta)"	3:45
7.	"Sevilla de Bilbao"	4:00
8.	"Mientras tanto (Leño cover)"	3:54
9.	"Alegría"	5:50
10.	"A mil kilómetros"	3:04

== Chart performance ==
Chart (2001)	Peak position
Spanish Albums Chart	30

== Certifications ==
Region	Certification	Certified units/sales
Spain (PROMUSICAE)	2× Platinum	200,000^{^}
^{^} Shipments figures based on certification alone.
