= OBK =

Spanish synth-pop music group

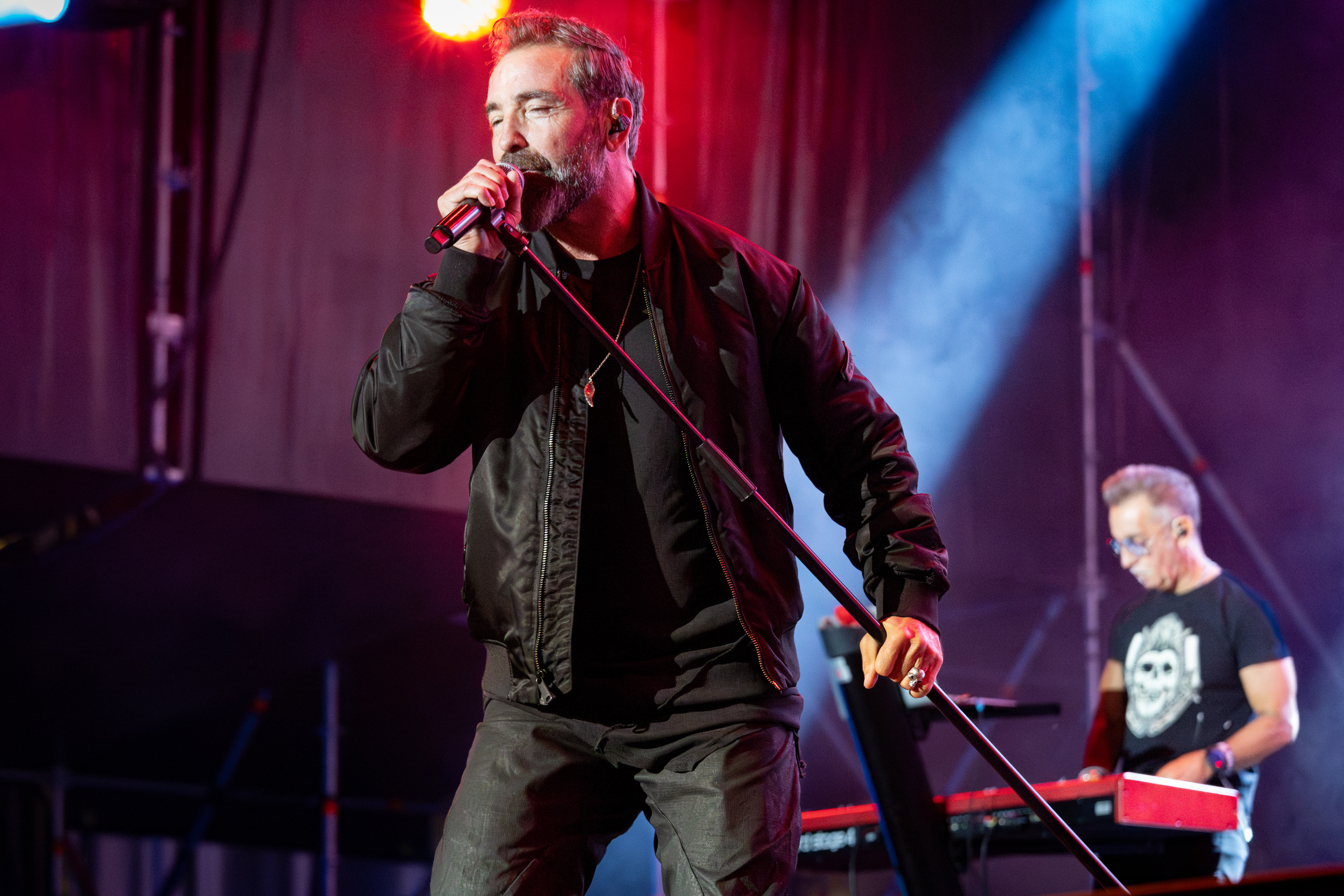
- OBK performing in 2026

Background information
- Origin: Sant Feliu de Llobregat (Barcelona), Spain
- Genres: Synth-pop, trance
- Years active: 1990–present
- Label: Warner Music Group
- Members: Jordi Sanchez; Miguel Arjona
- Website: www.obkmusic.net

OBK is a Spanish synth-pop music group from Barcelona (Spain) composed of Jordi Sánchez and Miguel Arjona. The group was famous for introducing the electronic music in Spain in the 1990s (in the early 1980s some Spanish synth-pop bands as Azul y Negro and Aviador Dro, among others, had gained great success also).

== Members ==
- Jordi Sánchez from 1990 to present
- Miguel Arjona from 1990 to 2012

== History ==
=== The OBK boom ===
Jordi Sanchez and Miguel Arjona met for first time in the Athletism club of Sant Feilu de Llobregat. They were influenced by groups like Depeche Mode, Erasure and Orchestral Manoeuvres in the Dark. The group debuted in the musical scene with Konga Music, an indie record label which supported all kinds of electronic music. In 1991 appeared their first release, a mini album called Llámalo sueño (Call it a dream). This album is the most successful of their career and sold over 400,000 copies in Spain. In fact, they entered in the history of the Spanish pop music for being the first group that had such sales with a debut album. Four singles were released from the album. The first one was "¿De que me sirve llorar?" (What can I do by crying?), "Oculta realidad" (Hidden truth), "La princesa de mis sueños" (The princess of my dreams), and the most famous hit: "Historias de amor" (Love stories), which is considered the icon song from the group.

Two years later appeared their second album, called Momentos de fe (Moments of faith), that was released with the label Blanco y negro music. This time the album was highly promoted, but it didn't have the success of the first album. It sold over 130,000 copies. The singles extracted from the album were: "Dicen" (They say), "Robarle al tiempo" (To steal from Time), "Lágrimas de soledad" (Loneliness tears) and "Todavía" (Still). The first single was very polemical because the title song was directed at the musical critics who used to make very bad reviews about their music.

=== Decline in sales and popularity ===
The third album, called "Trilogía" (Trilogy), was released in 1995. It was their first album released with the Spanish branch of EMI, the same label in which they would release their next albums. Trilogía was famous for its first single: "Mi razón de ser" (My reason for being), the first single that became an instantaneous hit. The following singles were: "Nada soy sin ti" (I'm nothing without you), "Dulce final" (Sweet end), and "Otra canción de amor" (Another love song). In spite of being under promoted, the album was well received, but its success was only moderate: It sold 80,000 copies and was certified gold. This was much lower than expected, and was the start of a long bad relationship with their record label.

One year later they released their fourth album, called Donde el corazón nos lleve (Where the heart may lead us). The title of the album was intended as an ultimatum to EMI in result of the bad relationship with this label. The sales of this album were a huge failure. In fact, the album was not certified, which led to a quick decline of the popularity of the group.

In 1998 they released a compilation album Singles 91/98. This retrospective album was a "goodbye" to their fans because EMI had completely lost confidence in them. The album contained four new songs: "En medio de nada" (In the middle of nothing), "Juicio interior" (Inner judgment), a cover of "De qué me sirve llorar?", and a remix of "Historias de amor". The unexpected and surprising success of this album (200.000 copies) was one of the reasons why the group regained popularity, and gave them the chance to stay with EMI.

=== Return to pre-eminence ===
In 2000, two years after the compilation album, they released their fifth studio album, called "ANTROPOP", the second best selling album of their career (300,000 copies sold in Spain and 800,000 in Latin America). This album was produced by Carlos Jean, one of the big names of the Spanish electronic music scene. This album had four singles: "Tu sigue así" (Keep on like that), whose music video won the Ondas award for the best promotional video. The second single "El cielo no entiende" (Heaven doesn't understand) was used as the main theme for Spain's cycling tour coverage. The remaining singles were: "Falsa moral" (False morality) and "Lo tengo que dejar" (I have to stop this). Babylon, Feeling, Ultimatum, and 20BK are the albums which complete their discography. In June 2012 they released a new single called "Promises", which will be included in the new studio album of original material that will be released in 2013.

== Discography ==
=== Albums ===
Kind	Name	Year	Peak	Kind	Sales	Seal/Company
LP/CD	Llámalo sueño	1991	2		3× Platinum (300,000)	Blanco y Negro Music
LP/CD	Momentos de fe	1993	8		Platinum (100,000)	Blanco y Negro Music
LP/CD	Trilogía	1995	10		Gold (50,000)	EMI / Hispavox
LP/CD	Donde el corazón nos lleve	1996	27		-	EMI / Hispavox
LP/CD	Singles 91/98	1998	6	Compilation	2× Platinum (200,000)	EMI / Hispavox
LP/CD	Antropop	2000	2		3× Platinum (300,000+)	EMI / Hispavox
LP/CD	Extrapop	2001	10	Remix album	Gold (50,000)	EMI / Hispavox
LP/CD	Babylon	2003	2		Gold (50,000)	EMI / Capitol
LP/CD	Sonorama	2004	7	2nd compilation	Gold (50,000)	EMI / Capitol
LP/CD	Feeling	2005	5		Gold (50,000)	EMI / Capitol
LP/CD	Ultimatum	2008	8		-	Warner Music Group
LP/CD	20BK	2011	1		-	Warner Music Group
LP/CD	Live in Mexico	2016	39		-	Parlophone

=== Singles ===
- 1991: De que me sirve llorar
- 1991: Oculta realidad
- 1992: Historias de amor
- 1992: La princesa de mis sueños
- 1993: Dicen!...
- 1993: Robarle al tiempo
- 1993: Lágrimas de soledad
- 1994: Todavía
- 1995: Mi razón de ser
- 1995: Nada soy sin ti
- 1995: Dulce final
- 1996: Otra canción de amor
- 1996: Si esto no es amor
- 1997: Un día gris
- 1998: A contrapié
- 1998: Historias de amor (ASAP mix)
- 2000: Tu sigue así...
- 2000: El cielo no entiende
- 2000: Falsa moral
- 2001: Lo tengo que dejar
- 2003: Lucifer
- 2003: Quiereme otra vez
- 2004: La herida
- 2005: Sin rencor
- 2005: A ras del suelo
- 2006: Yo no soy COOL♥
- 2008: Yo no me escondo
- 2008: Siempre tú
- 2011: Oculta realidad '11
- 2011: El cielo no entiende '11
- 2011: Historias de amor '11
- 2012: Promises Ft. Pierre N'Sue
