= Mikel Erentxun =

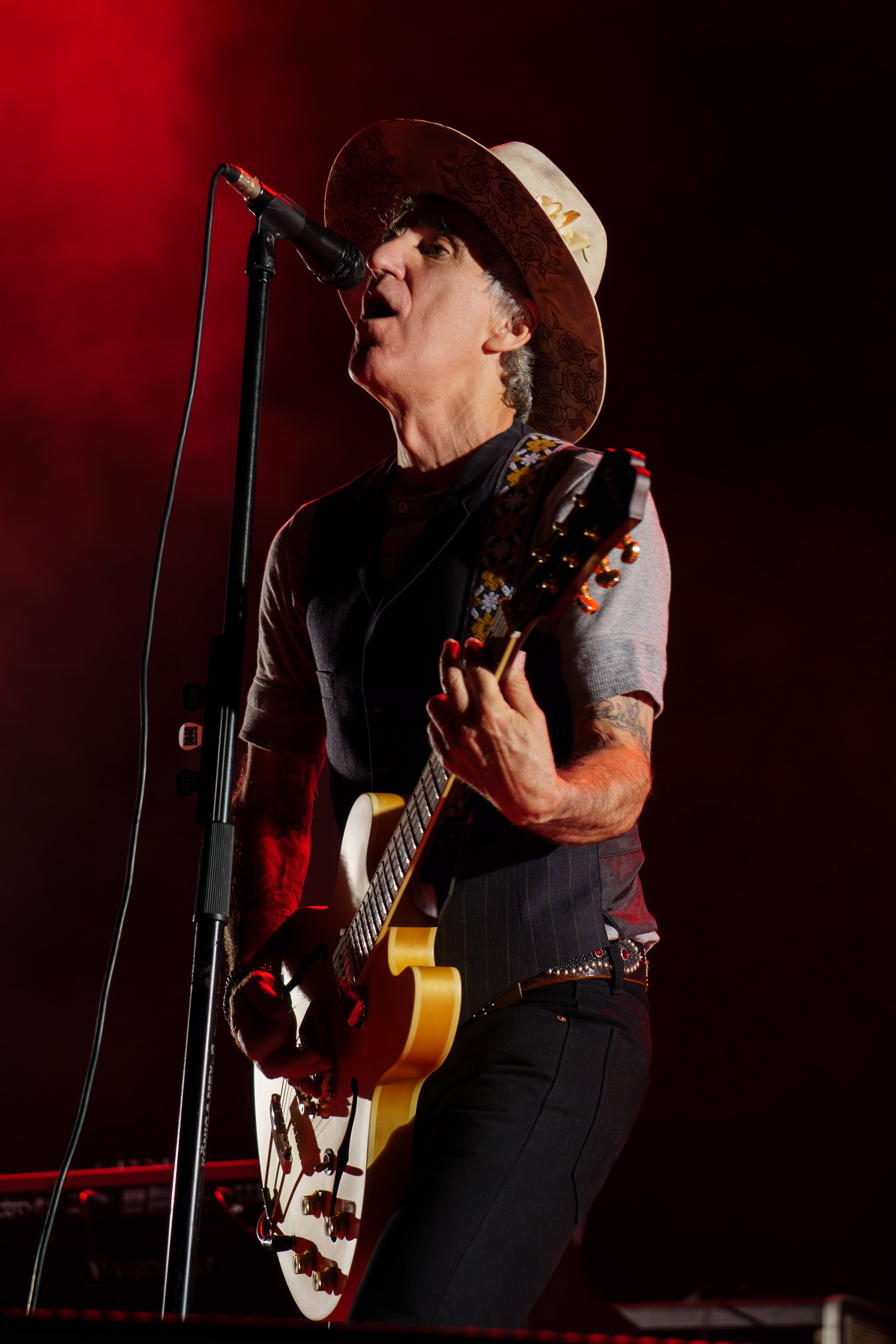
- Erentxun in 2025

Background information
- Born: 23 February 1965 (age 61); Caracas, Venezuela
- Origin: Spain
- Genres: Rock en Español
- Occupations: Musician; vocalist
- Years active: 1978–present
- Website: Official website

Mikel Erentxun Acosta (born 23 February 1965) is a Spanish rock singer and musician.

== Career ==
Formerly with the group Duncan Dhu, he started his solo career in 1992. He has released 16 albums as a solo artist and has covered The Smiths' song, "There Is a Light That Never Goes Out", as "Esta luz nunca se apagará", as well as Morrissey's "Everyday Is Like Sunday" as "Todo es Igual Siempre". He has collaborated with Mark Gardener, Robert Quine, drummer Pete Thomas, Lloyd Cole, Matthew Sweet and Fred Maher. In 2005 the band the Lightning Seeds sued Erentxun for alleged plagiarism of their song "Pure", but the suit was eventually dismissed.

== Discography ==
Albums

- Naufragios (1992)
- El abrazo del Erizo (1995)
- Acróbatas (1998)
- 7 Años (1999)
- Te dejas ver (2000)
- Ciudades de Paso (2003)
- Éxitos (2004)
- El corredor de la suerte (2006)
- Tres Noches en el Victoria Eugenia (2008)
- Detalle del Miedo (2010)
- 24 Golpes (2012)
- Electrica PKWY (Limited edition) (2012)
- Corazones (2015)
- Corazón Salvaje EP (2015)
- El hombre sin sombra (2017)
- Live at the Roxy (2018)
- Amigos de Guardia (2021)
- Septiembre (2023)

Singles

- A un minuto de ti
- Esta luz nunca se apagará
- Jugando con el tiempo
- Miénteme
- Lentamente
- De espaldas a mí
- Suelta las riendas de mi corazón
- El cielo es el color de las hormigas
- Ahora sé que estás
- El abrazo de erizo
- ¿Quién se acuerda de ti?
- A pleno sol
- Todo es igual siempre
- Tu nombre en los labios
- California
- Fácil
- Rara vez
- La orilla de carla
- Mañana
- En el sur
- Loco de atar
- Grandes éxitos
- Esos días
- A un minuto de ti (2004 rerecorded version)
