= El monte de los aullidos =

Studio album by Fito & Fitipaldis
- Released: 24 October 2025
- Genre: Rock; Spanish rock
- Language: Spanish
- Label: Warner Music Spain
- Producer: Carlos Raya

Fito & Fitipaldis chronology
| Cada vez Cadáver (2021) | El monte de los aullidos (2025) |

Singles from El monte de los aullidos
- 1. "Los cuervos se lo pasan bien" Released: 4 September 2025

El monte de los aullidos (English: The Mountain of the Howls) is the eighth studio album by Spanish rock band Fito & Fitipaldis. It was released on 24 October 2025 by Warner Music Spain, and was produced by band member Carlos Raya.

== Background ==
After completing the "Cada vez Cadáver" tour, frontman Fito Cabrales announced a break before resuming the composition of new songs. The creative process of the album unfolded slowly during 2024 and early 2025, with the aim of recovering the classic band dynamic and a direct approach to recording.

The album was recorded in April 2025 at Estudio Uno, located in Colmenar Viejo, Madrid, and was once again produced by Carlos Raya, a regular collaborator with Fito & Fitipaldis since the band's early albums and fellow band member. The recording was made with a focus on live takes, seeking to capture the band's natural energy and minimizing the use of digital editing. Unlike previous works, El monte de los aullidos is the band's first studio album that does not include covers of other artists, being composed entirely of original material.

Musically, the album maintains its foundation of rock and blues rock, with touches of rockabilly and swing in songs such as "Una maldita suerte" ("Damn luck") and even ballads such as "La noche más perfecta" ("The most perfect night"), and lyrics that explore personal introspection, love, pain, humor, and social issues from a personal point of view, such as references to war in "Volverá el espanto" ("The horror will return").

According to statements by Fito himself, the lyrics reflect moments of anxiety, personal therapy, and emotional growth, with an introspective and emotional approach.

== Tour ==
The promotional tour, the Aullidos Tour, began on 22 November 2025, in Santander and will visit 28 Spanish cities and conclude in May 2026. The band has sold more than 380,000–400,000 tickets, with several dates already sold out (including Madrid, Barcelona, Bilbao, and Seville).

== Track listing ==
| No. | Title | Length |
|---|---|---|
| 1. | "Los cuervos se lo pasan bien" | 4:26 |
| 2. | "El monte de los aullidos" | 5:01 |
| 3. | "Volverá el espanto" | 3:19 |
| 4. | "Como un ataúd" | 3:06 |
| 5. | "A contraluz" | 4:22 |
| 6. | "La noche más perfecta" | 4:45 |
| 7. | "Marea imparable" | 3:47 |
| 8. | "Una maldita suerte" | 3:16 |
| 9. | "Mentira y verdad" | 3:33 |
| 10. | "Ardi" | 3:17 |

== Personnel ==
- Fito Cabrales – lead vocals, guitar
- Carlos Raya – guitar, production
- Coki Giménez – drums
- Boli Climent – bass
- Javier Alzola – saxophone

== Chart performance ==
| Chart (2021) | Peak position |
|---|---|
| Spanish Albums Chart | 1 |

== Certifications ==
| Region | Certification | Certified units/sales |
|---|---|---|
| Spain (PROMUSICAE) | Gold | 20,000^{‡} |
^{‡} Sales+streaming figures based on certification alone.
