= Cada vez Cadáver =

Studio album by Fito & Fitipaldis
- Released: 24 September 2021
- Genre: Rock
- Length: 44:35
- Language: Spanish
- Labels: Warner Music Spain
- Producer: Carlos Raya

Fito & Fitipaldis chronology
Fitografía (2017)	Cada vez Cadáver (2021)	El monte de los aullidos (2025)

Singles from Cada vez Cadáver
- 1. "Cada vez cadáver" Released: 11 May 2021; 2. "Cielo hermético" Released: 27 August 2021; 3. "A quemarropa" Released: 12 May 2022; 4. "Si me ves así" Released: 7 October 2022

Cada vez Cadáver (roughly: More and More Like a Corpse) is the seventh studio album by Spanish rock band Fito & Fitipaldis, released on 24 September 2021 by Warner Music Spain and produced by band member Carlos Raya.

It is the band's first album that does not contain a cover of a Spanish artist's song, but instead includes a cover of "Transporte" by Uruguayan musician Jorge Drexler.

== Background ==
After a long period of inactivity, lead singer Fito Cabrales decided to return to the studio to record new material. The album was produced by bandmate Carlos Raya, who has worked with the band on previous productions. It was recorded in various studios in Spain and featured collaborations with musicians from the rock and blues scene.

The album continues in the characteristic style of Fito & Fitipaldis, mixing rock and roll, blues, and pop. Fito Cabrales' lyrics address introspective themes, often reflecting on the passage of time, life, and death, which is reflected in the album's title.

== Tour ==
To promote the album, Fito & Fitipaldis embarked on a tour of Spain, which began in March 2022. The tour was a success, with several sold-out dates and a warm reception from the public.

== Reception ==
Professional ratings
Review scores
Source	Rating
Mondo Sonoro	7/10

Alejandro Caballero Serrano of Mondo Sonoro rated the album seven out of ten, highlighting that "[Fito & Fitipaldis] are capable of creating new songs despite having filled our music library for more than thirty years. Ten tracks in which they innovate in the lyrics, but little in the music."

== Industry awards ==
Year	Ceremony	Category	Result	Ref.
2022	Premios Odeón	Album of the Year	Nominated	
2022	Premios Odeón	Best Rock Album	Won	
2022	Premios Odeón	Odeón Rock Artist	Nominated	
2022	Latin Grammy Awards	Best Rock Album	Nominated	
2023	Premios Odeón	Tour of the Year	Won	

== Track listing ==
No.	Title	Length
1.	"Cada vez Cadáver"	5:40
2.	"Cielo hermético"	4:00
3.	"Fantasmas"	4:27
4.	"A quemarropa"	4:54
5.	"Las palabras arden"	5:16
6.	"Si me ves así"	3:50
7.	"Quiero gritar"	4:52
8.	"En el barro"	4:20
9.	"A morir cantando"	4:23
10.	"Transporte"	3:05

== Personnel ==
- Adolfo "Fito" Cabrales – lead vocals, acoustic guitar, electric guitar
- Javier Alzola – saxophone
- Joserra Senperena – Hammond organ, keyboards, piano
- Carlos Raya – electric guitar, slide guitar, pedal steel guitar
- Alejandro "Boli" Climent – bass guitar
- Daniel Griffin – drums
- Coki Giménez – drums

== Chart performance ==
Chart (2021)	Peak position
Spanish Album Charts	1

== Certifications ==
Region	Certification	Certified units/sales
Spain (Promusicae)	Platinum	40,000^{‡}
^{‡} Sales+streaming figures based on certification alone.
