= Fito & Fitipaldis =

Spanish rock band

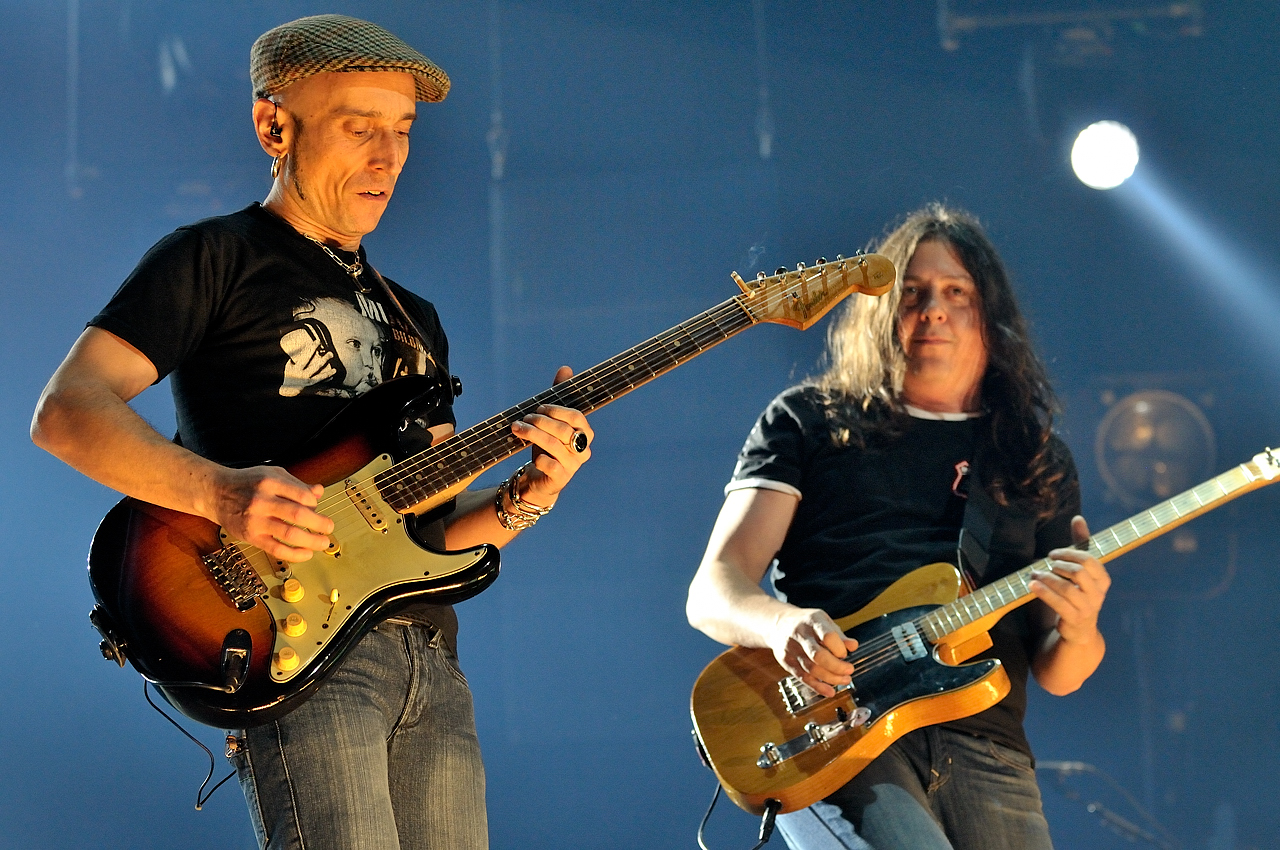
- Fito Cabrales (left) and Carlos Raya of Fito & Fitipaldis performing in Barcelona in 2009

Background information
- Origin: Bilbao, Spain
- Genres: Rock and roll; blues rock; rockabilly; rhythm and blues; swing; jazz; Latin rock
- Years active: 1997–present
- Label: Warner Music Spain
- Members: Fito Cabrales; Carlos Raya; Javier Alzola; Alejandro "Boli" Climent; Coki Giménez; Joserra Semperena
- Past members: José Alberto Bátiz; Miguel Colino; Roberto Caballero; Irazoki; Polako; Chema "Animal"; José "El niño" Bruno; Candy Caramelo
- Website: http://www.fitoyfitipaldis.com

Fito & Fitipaldis, also known in Spanish as Fito y Fitipaldis (Spanish pronunciation: [ˈfitoj fitiˈpaldis]), is a Spanish rock band, formed in 1997 by vocalist and guitarist Fito Cabrales. Initially emerging as a side project that Cabrales decided to continue after the breakup of his previous band, Platero y Tú, the band was created with the intention of publishing songs which were not in the style of Platero y Tú. The band's musical style is a mix of many genres, such as rock, soul, and swing. The band's sales led to the group receiving a Diamond Disc for selling over a million albums in October 2007. By October 2014, the band's sales had surpassed 1,600,000 discs.

== History ==
=== 1997–2000: Beginnings ===
Adolfo “Fito” Cabrales, lead singer and guitarist of Platero y Tú, began in 1997 to shape a side project to give vent to compositions that did not fit with the harder, more electric sound of his main band. The new group, who would then be known as Fito & Fitipaldis, allowed him to explore genres such as rockabilly, rhythm and blues, swing, jazz, and other sounds from the southern United States.

Fito has been described by colleagues and the press as a hyperactive musician who, between rehearsals and tours, sought out any opportunity to play. After concerts, he would prolong the night in bars, sometimes until the early hours in his hotel room, which led him to meet musicians who would eventually join the band. In one of those impromptu sessions, an assistant joined in with an electric bass; shortly after, Txus Alday (guitar, formerly of The Flying Rebollos), Miguel Colino (bass), Polako (drums, formerly of Zer Bizio?), and percussionist Arturo García joined along with Fito. The group's first official concert took place at the Umore Ona bar, where the name “Fito & Fitipaldis” was adopted at Polako's suggestion.

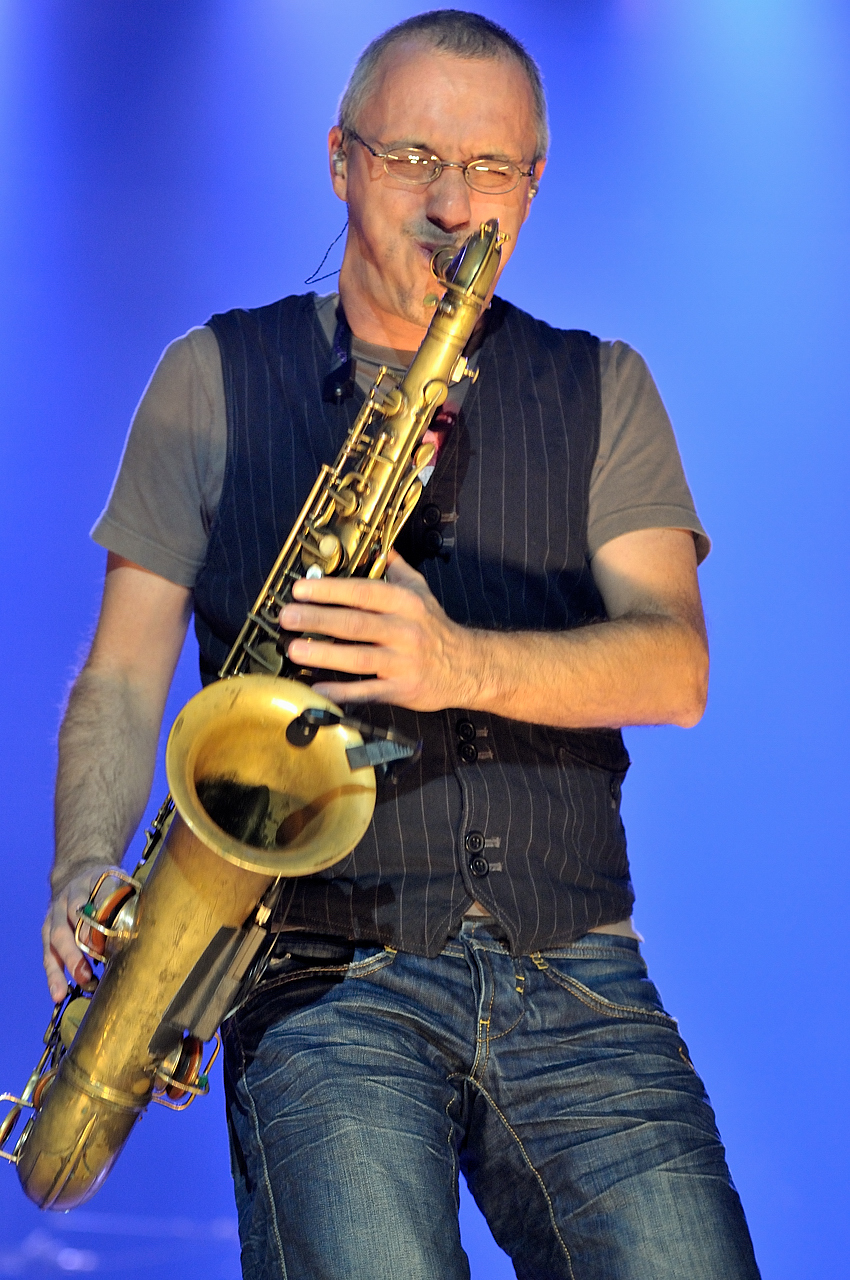
Javier Alzola performing with Fito & Fitipaldis in 2009. He provided saxophone on the band's debut album, A Puerta Cerrada.

During this time, Iñaki Antón (“Uoho”), Fito's bandmate in Platero y Tú, suggested recording the songs the group performed. This led to the creation of A Puerta Cerrada (Behind Closed Doors), recorded in December 1997 and released on 23 October 1998, with the release date delayed so as not to coincide with Platero y Tú's tour. The album, produced by Antón, included Javier Alzola on saxophone and Arturo García providing percussion, and was recorded in just one week, with everyone playing at the same time and repeating the minimum necessary.

The album features an acoustic and intimate style, with touches of swing and blues, and has been described as "an acoustic Platero y Tú" due to its instrumental simplicity and introspective lyrics, which are more intimate than those Fito used to present in his main band. Among his most notable songs are “Rojitas las orejas” (Red Ears), his first single, “Mirando al cielo” (Looking at the Sky), “Trapos sucios” (Dirty Laundry), and “Trozos de cristal” (Pieces of Glass) with Robe. The repertoire, direct and without unnecessary embellishments, was well received by critics, who appreciated its honesty and creative urgency.

The promotion of A puerta cerrada began in November 1998 with performances in small venues, although in 1999 the band joined Extremoduro as their opening act on tour, which expanded their audience. By the end of the tour, the album had sold around 35,000 copies and eventually went double platinum.

=== 2001–2005: Second lineup and Platero y Tú's breakup ===
While Platero y Tú was finishing up its last tour in 2001, Fito & Fitipaldis released their second album, Los Sueños Locos (Crazy Dreams). In 2002, a special edition of the album was released with several live tracks. Electric guitars and rock and roll reappeared on this second album, although with a very personal style that Fito had been developing over the previous years. One of the characteristics of the artist's solo project was the combination of multiple styles and sounds, which allowed him to reach a wider audience. Ultimately, this album also went platinum.

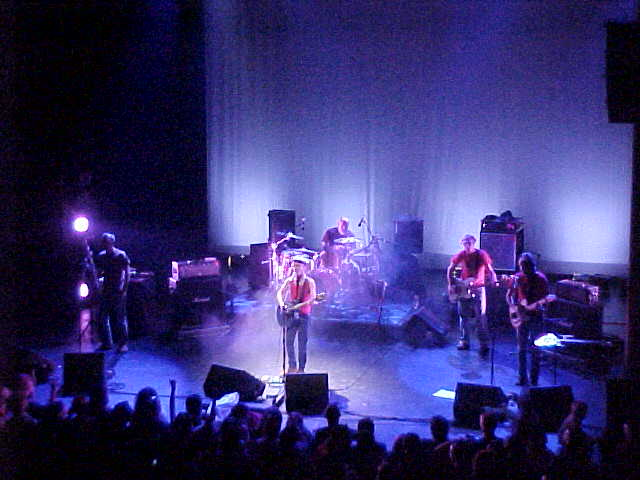
Fito & Fitipaldis performing in Puerto del Rosario in 2005

Also in 2001, the year Los Sueños Locos was released, Fito participated alongside Iñaki 'Uoho' Antón and Roberto "Robe" Iniesta in the project Extrechinato y Tú, where, on Robe's initiative, the album Poesía básica (which they had been recording since 1999) was released with lyrics by the poet Manolo Chinato. Fito was one of the key members of the project, recording the vocals with Robe, the guitars with Uoho, and contributing his own compositions. The album eventually went Gold.

The reception of Fito's solo project had positive responses, and Fito gave an interview to the press in which he confirmed that he was leaving Platero y Tú, and as a result, the band broke up, to devote himself fully to Fito & Fitipaldis.

In 2003, Fito & Fitipaldis released Lo Más Lejos a Tu Lado (The Furthest Next to You), their third studio album. Radio stations began playing songs from the album such as "La casa por el tejado" and "Soldadito marinero", and the album consolidated the band's position on the national scene, as the album went triple platinum in 2009. In August 2004, Fito & Fitipaldis gave a free concert at the Bilbao festivities in front of nearly 70,000 people. The concert was recorded in Vivo...Para Contarlo (Live... to Tell), a live CD+DVD that went Platinum. The name of the album was suggested by Andrés Calamaro.

=== 2005–2021: Expansion and further success ===
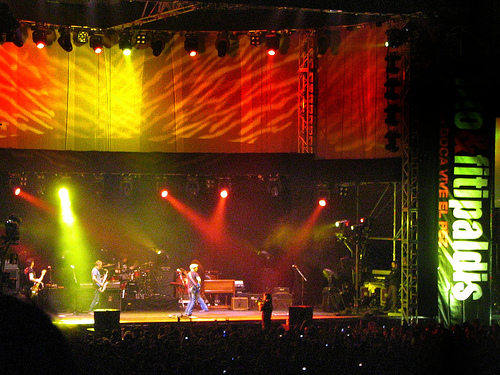
Fito & Fitipaldis performing in 2007

In 2005, journalist Darío Vico (Rolling Stone, El País) published the book Cultura de bar, in which Fito speaks candidly and gives a comprehensive overview of his career from its beginnings to that moment.

In September 2006, Por la Boca Vive el Pez (The Fish Lives Through Its Mouth), Fito & Fitipaldis' fourth studio album, was released. The album went double platinum in just fifteen days and ranked No. 1 on the Spanish album charts for several weeks. Fito received the awards for "Best Song" and "Best Rock Album" at the Music Awards and sales reached Triple Platinum. In November 2006, the album's promotional tour began. By the time the tour ended in December 2007, more than 100 concerts had been performed, with a total attendance of over 700,000 spectators.

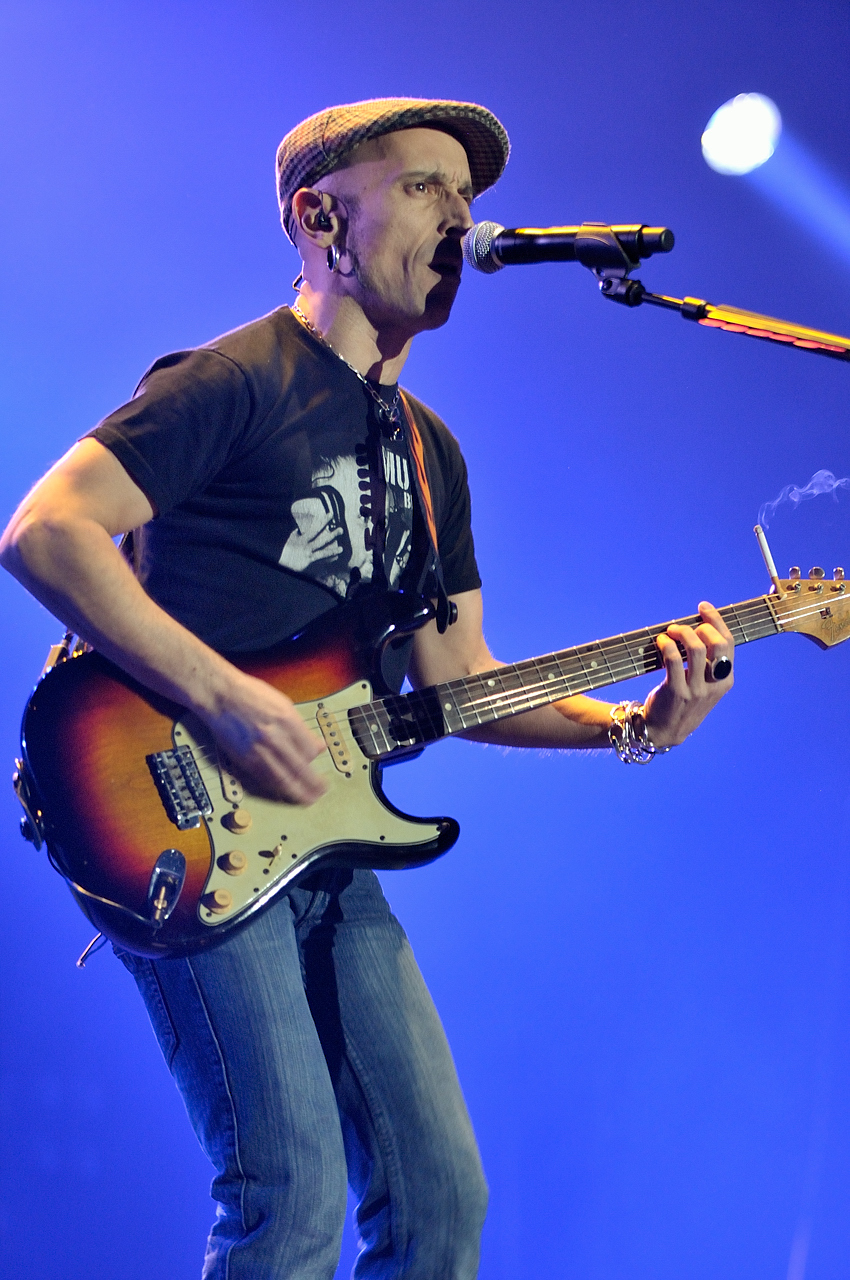
Fito Cabrales performing with Fitipaldis at Palau Sant Jordi in Barcelona, 2009

In the middle of the Por la Boca Vive el Pez tour, in the summer of 2007, Fito put together a mini-tour of five concerts called Dos Son Multitud, in which he shared the stage with Andrés Calamaro. A CD+DVD of the live tour was later released. In December 2007, the experience continued when Calamaro invited Fito & Fitipaldis to tour with him for five concerts in Latin America.

In 2008, Fito received a Diamond Disc for selling over a million albums with Fitipaldis, and his autobiography, Soy todo lo que me pasa (I Am Everything That Happens to Me), was released on 8 April of that year. Los Secretos invited him to play at their anniversary concert, and the City Council of his native Bilbao named him "Illustrious Citizen of Bilbao".

In 2009, Fito returned to music with new songs and made some slight changes: he repeated with the production of Joe Blaney and the guitar support of fellow member Carlos Raya, but chose Landes (Du Manoir studios in southern France) as the place to record his new repertoire and entrusted the rhythm section to two veteran instrumentalists, drummer Pete “The Attractions” Thomas and bassist Andy Hess. The result was Fito & Fitipaldis' fifth studio album, titled Antes de que cuente diez (Before I Count to Ten), which went on sale on 15 September that year.

Prior to that, Fito received the 2009 Ondas Award for "Best National Artist" in Barcelona, while Dani Griffin and Alejandro "Boli" Climent joined Fitipaldis, replacing drummer José "Niño" Bruno and bassist Candy Caramelo, respectively. On 6 November 2009, Fito & Fitipaldis kicked off their Antes de que cuente diez tour in Santander, Spain, which ended on 30 December 2010, with seventy-three concerts. In addition, the summer break of that year served as the timeframe for two new experiences: concerts in London, England (17 August) and Shanghai, China (22 August).

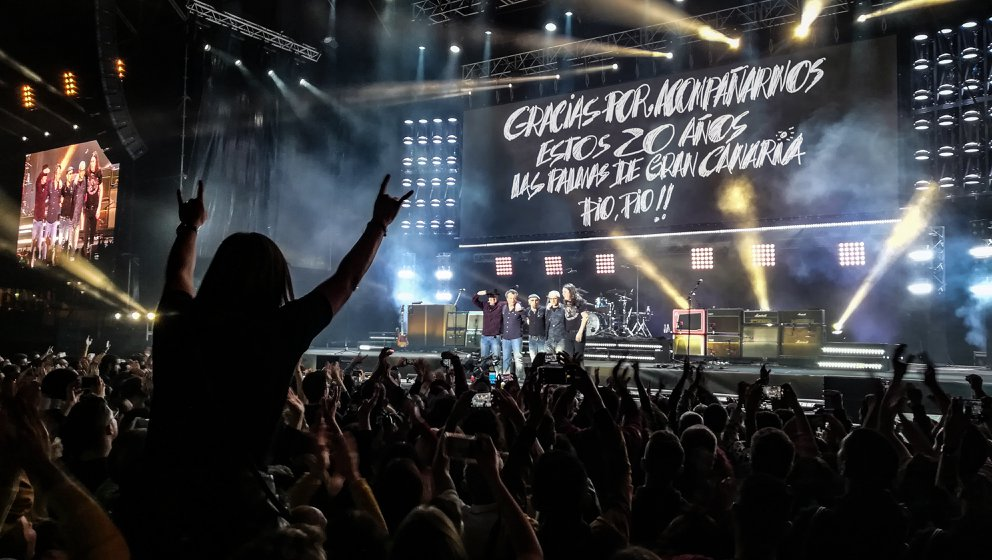
Fito & Fitipaldis wrapping up a concert in Las Palmas in 2019

In the fall of 2012, the band decided to embark on a theater tour that traveled throughout the country and sold out most venues in Spain. The band's intention was to have a more limited capacity so they could revisit old songs and perform them acoustically, as well as reinvent some new songs. Thus, on 4 March 2014, the En directo desde el Teatro Arriaga (Live from the Arriaga Theater) double CD & DVD was released, recorded live at the charity concerts the band gave in October 2013 at the Teatro Arriaga in Bilbao.

On 28 October 2014, the band released Huyendo conmigo de mí (Running Away With Me From Myself), their sixth studio album, which maintains Fito's characteristic style of fusing rock, blues, and pop. The album was well received by critics and the public, reaching number 1 on the sales charts in Spain and obtaining triple platinum certification for more than 120,000 copies sold. The band promoted the album with an extensive tour of Spain, as well as performing in Argentina, Chile, and Uruguay.

On 10 November 2017, the band's first compilation album Fitografía (Fitography) was released, featuring more than fifty tracks that span his entire career, including a cover of Entre dos mares by Platero y tú. In March 2018, the band embarked on a tour of Spain entitled 20 años, 20 ciudades (20 years, 20 cities).

=== 2021–present: Current events and recent projects ===
Seven years after the band's last studio album, in September 2021, they released their seventh album Cada vez Cadáver (roughly: More and More Like a Corpse) The album maintains the characteristic style of Fito & Fitipaldis, fusing rock, blues, and pop. The lyrics by Fito are described as introspective, addressing themes such as the passage of time, life, and death, reflected in the album's title.

After the release of Cada vez cadáver, Fito & Fitipaldis embarked on a tour throughout Spain in 2022, which was a huge success. On that tour, Fito shared the stage with guest artists such as Morgan, a soul-rock band from Madrid.

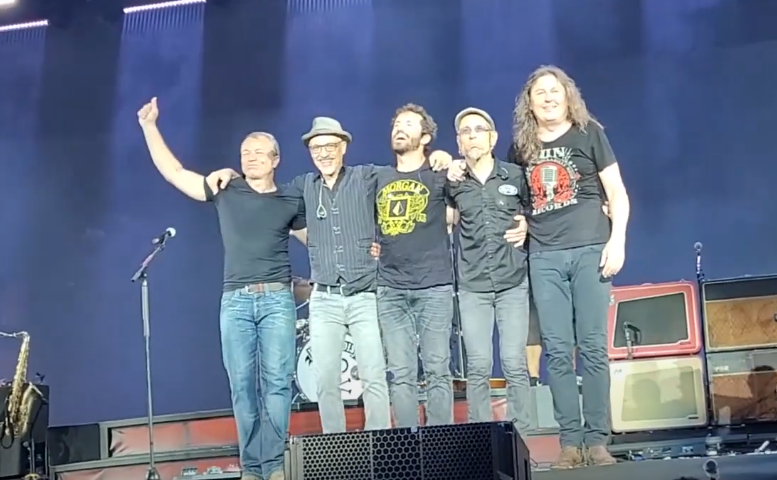
Fito & Fitipaldis concluding their concert in San Mamés Stadium in 2022

On 11 June 2022, Fito & Fitipaldis performed a concert at the San Mamés Stadium in Bilbao as part of their Cada vez cadáver tour. In front of more than 46,000 people, the band gave a lengthy performance that lasted almost two and a half hours. The concert featured performances by several prominent artists, including Dani Martín, Leiva, Morgan, Carlos Tarque, and Iñaki “Uoho” Antón, Fito's former bandmate in Platero y Tú, who participated in "Hay poco rock and roll" and "El roce de tu cuerpo." The concert was broadcast live on ETB2, Radio Euskadi, EITB, and RTVE, reaching an average audience of 728,000 viewers throughout Spain.

During their Cada vez cadáver tour in 2022, Fito & Fitipaldis became the Spanish artist with the greatest drawing power, bringing together almost 330,000 attendees at 27 concerts, 13 of which were sold out. This surpassed other prominent artists such as Alejandro Sanz, who drew 288,000 people to 16 concerts, and Manuel Carrasco, with 260,800 attendees at 19 concerts.

After four years, the band released their eighth studio album, El monte de los aullidos (The Mountain of the Howls), in October 2025, which retains the band's characteristic rock style, mixing melodic rock, warm guitars, and meticulous production. At the same time, there are moments that incorporate influences from swing music, ballads, and rockabilly.

== Influences ==
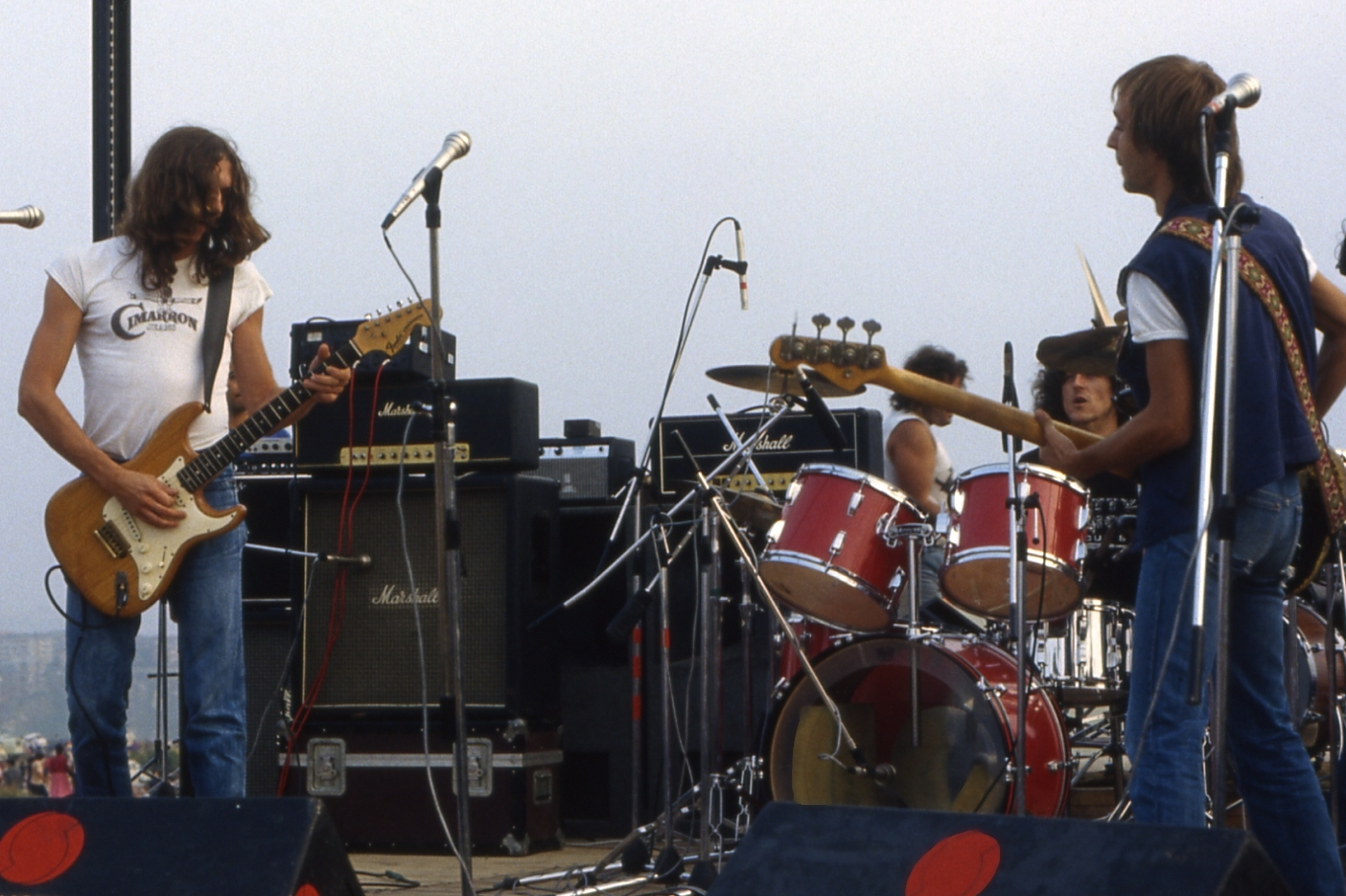
Spanish rock band Leño (pictured in 1981) inspired Fito's songwriting.

Fito & Fitipaldis is known for their eclectic musical style, which blends genres such as rock and roll, blues, soul, swing, pop rock, Latin jazz, flamenco and Tex-Mex.

Fito, the band's frontman, preferring American rock over British rock, has always had a special interest in blues and rhythm and blues, being inspired by artists such as Rory Gallagher, Status Quo, Johnny Winter, Van Morrison, Clarence Gatemouth Brown, JJ Cale, and Mark Knopfler. He was also greatly inspired by the hard rock of AC/DC. From a more local approach, Miguel Ríos, Cucharada, Manolo Tena, and Leño served as his main sources of inspiration.

With the formation of Fito & Fitipaldis in 1997, Fito began to explore a less standardized style of rock in his compositions, incorporating influences from artists such as Flaco Jiménez and Compay Segundo.

== Acknowledgements ==
=== Industry ===
Fito is known for being one of the most influential rock bands in the Spanish music industry. Many famous artists have spoken about how the band has influenced them through their songs, such as Estopa, Camilo, Alejandro Moya, Angy Fernández, Dani Martín, Manuel Carrasco, Leiva, Kutxi Romero, Lichis, Fernando Madina (frontman of Reincidentes), Albert Rivera, Melendi, and El Gran Wyoming, among others.

=== Diamond Disc ===
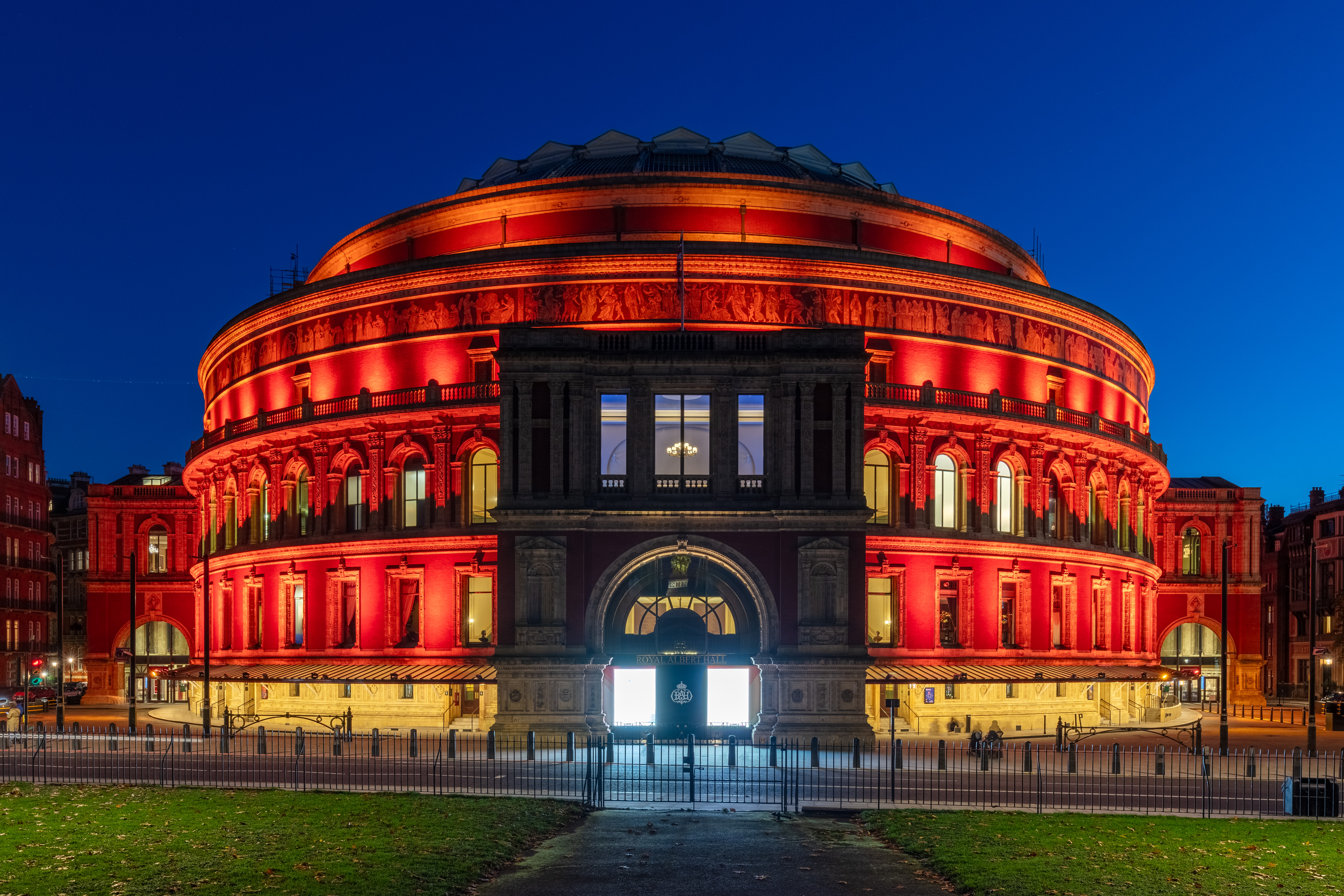
Royal Albert Hall, London

In October 2007, Fito & Fitipaldis were awarded the Diamond Disc for having sold over a million records throughout their career. This recognition was presented at a ceremony held at the headquarters of the General Society of Authors and Publishers (SGAE) in Madrid, where musician Quique González, a close friend of the band, had the honor of presenting them with the award.

=== Concert at the Royal Albert Hall ===
Fito & Fitipaldis concluded their "20 Years, 20 Cities" tour with a concert at London's Royal Albert Hall on 16 September 2018. This event marked a milestone in the band's career, as they became the first Spanish rock group to perform at one of the most historical venues in the world. The concert featured a selection of their most famous hits, including "Siempre estoy soñando", "Un buen castigo", and "Por la boca vive el pez". The performance was well received by the audience, consolidating the band's international presence.

== In other media ==
The song "Por la boca vive el pez", the title track from Fito & Fitipaldis’ fourth album of the same name, is a DLC song in the video game Guitar Hero World Tour.

== Band members ==
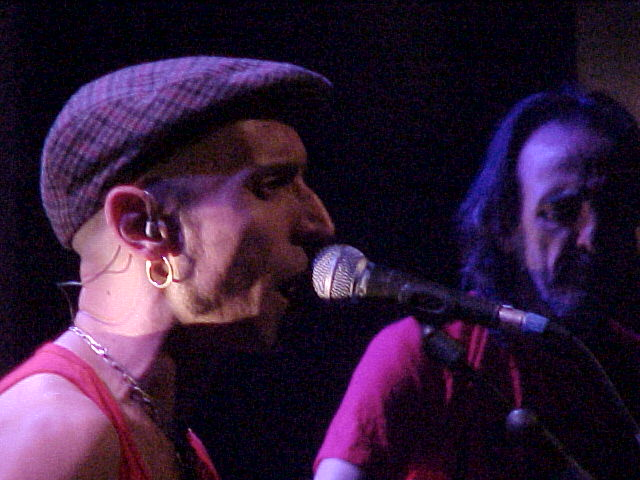
The band's frontman Adolfo "Fito" Cabrales

=== Current ===
- Adolfo "Fito" Cabrales – lead vocals, acoustic and electric guitar (1998–present)
- Carlos Raya – acoustic guitar, electric guitar, slide guitar, pedal steel guitar (2006–present)
- Alejandro "Boli" Climent – bass guitar (2009–present)
- Javier Alzola – saxophone (1998–present)
- Joserra Semperena – piano, keyboards, Hammond organ (2001–present)
- Coki Giménez – drums (2021–present)

=== Former ===
- Txus Alday – guitar (1997–2001)
- Miguel Colino – bass guitar (1997–2001)
- Cheva – drums (1997–2001)
- Ortuño – percussion (1997–2001)
- Gino Pavone – percussion (1997–2001)
- Mario Larrinaga – piano, keyboards (1997–2001)
- Edu "Baxter" Basterra – bass guitar (1998–2001)
- "Polako" – drums (1998–2001)
- José Alberto Batiz – guitar (2001–2005)
- Roberto Caballero – bass guitar (2001–2005)
- Ricardo Cantera – drums (2001–2005)
- Chema "Animal" Pérez – drums (2001–2005)
- Fernan Irazoki – drums (2001–2005)
- José "El niño" Bruno – drums (2006–2008)
- Roberto "Candy" Caramelo – bass guitar, vocals (2006–2008)
- Daniel Griffin – drums (2009–2021)

== Discography ==
=== Studio albums ===
Year	Studio albums	Peak chart positions	Certifications (sales thresholds)
Year	Studio albums	SPA	Certifications (sales thresholds)
1998	A Puerta Cerrada: Released: 16 October 1998; Label: Dro	54	SPA: Platinum
2001	Los Sueños Locos: Released: 19 October 2001; Label: Dro	30	SPA: Platinum
2003	Lo Más Lejos a Tu Lado: Released: 1 September 2003; Label: Dro	2	SPA: 3× Platinum
2006	Por la Boca Vive el Pez: Released: 11 September 2006; Label: Warner Music Spain	1	SPA: 4× Platinum
2009	Antes de que Cuente Diez: Released: 15 September 2009; Label: Warner Music Spain	1	SPA: 4× Platinum
2014	Huyendo conmigo de mí: Released: 28 October 2014; Label: Warner Music Spain	1	SPA: 3× Platinum
2021	Cada vez Cadáver: Released: 24 September 2021; Label: Warner Music Spain	1	SPA: Platinum
2025	El monte de los aullidos: Released: 24 October 2025; Label: Warner Music Spain	1	SPA: Gold
"—" denotes releases that did not chart or were not released in that country.

=== Live albums ===
Year	Live albums	Peak chart positions	Certifications (sales thresholds)
Year	Live albums	SPA	Certifications (sales thresholds)
2004	Vivo...Para Contarlo: Released: 22 November 2004; Label: Dro	8	SPA: Platinum
2008	Dos Son Multitud featuring Andrés Calamaro: Released: 25 March 2008; Label: Dro	2	—
2014	En directo desde el Teatro Arriaga: Released: 4 March 2014; Label: Dro	2	SPA: Gold
"—" denotes releases that did not chart or were not released in that country.

== See also ==
- Platero y Tú
- Extrechinato y Tú
- Extremoduro
- M Clan
