= Lo Más Lejos a Tu Lado =

Studio album by Fito & Fitipaldis
- Released: 1 September 2003
- Recorded: May–July 2003
- Genre: Rock; country rock; pop rock
- Language: Spanish
- Label: DRO

Fito & Fitipaldis chronology
Los Sueños Locos (2001)	Lo Más Lejos a Tu Lado (2003)	Vivo...Para Contarlo (2004)

Singles from Lo Más Lejos a Tu Lado
- 1. "La casa por el tejado" Released: 1 September 2003; 2. "Soldadito Marinero" Released: 1 September 2003

Lo Más Lejos a Tu Lado (English: The Furthest Next to You) is the third studio album by Spanish rock band Fito & Fitipaldis, released by DRO on 1 September 2003. The album marked the commercial success of the band, thanks to songs such as "La casa por el tejado" ("The house through the roof") and "Soldadito marinero" ("Little sailor soldier"). The album was produced by Iñaki "Uoho" Antón and combines rock, country, and urban rhythms. It went five times platinum in Spain in 2010. The original edition included a live DVD of the previous tour.

== Background ==
After the end of Platero y Tú, frontman Fito Cabrales formed Fito & Fitipaldis to record songs in styles different from those of his former group. Cabrales has described "Lo más lejos, a tu lado" as a "synthesis" of the group's first two albums, but with a strong emphasis on simplicity. According to El País, Fito and guitarist J. Alberto Batiz worked for months on demos before entering the studio for this third album, "This is the most carefully prepared album of the three recorded with Fitipaldis."

Musically, the album blends rock and roll, semi-acoustic, country, and other genres already present on previous albums. For example, the song "Nada que decir" ("Nothing to Say") has a similar style to Jerry Lee Lewis, while "El ojo que me mira" ("The Eye That Looks at Me") includes a final phrase in the similar style of The Police. The instrumentation incorporates wind instruments and urban elements into the band's basic rock sound. For example, there is an instrumental song, "Vámono" ("Let's go"), with wind arrangements and turntable scratching, and a trombone is featured in "Corazón oxidado" ("Rusty heart"). In addition, the album includes a cover of the classic "Quiero ser una estrella" ("I want to be a star"), originally by Los Rebeldes, as well as a DVD with a concert in San Sebastián (from the previous tour "Los sueños locos") in the initial edition.

The album was recorded between May and July 2003 at La Casa de Iñaki, the private studio of Iñaki "Uoho" Antón in Muxika in Biscay. Iñaki Antón, guitarist for Extremoduro and Fito's former bandmate in Platero y Tú, once again took on the tasks of producing, recording, and mixing the album.

The album cover shows Fito Cabrales wearing his trademark beret.

== Commercial performance ==
Lo Más Lejos a Tu Lado was a major sales success. It debuted high on the Spanish charts (Promusicae) and reached number 2 on the Top 100 albums in Spain, and by 2007, it had already spent 160 weeks on the charts.

It went gold in the year of its release and then platinum that same year after selling 100,000 copies. After this, Promusicae lowered the number of units needed to achieve platinum status from 100,000 to 80,000 units. In 2006, it achieved double platinum status, and in 2007, triple platinum status before any further reductions in figures were made, adding another 80,000 physical copies sold in Spain. In 2010, it achieved quintuple platinum status in Spain.

The single "Soldadito marinero" was particularly noteworthy, although the single "La casa por el tejado" also received significant airplay.

== Cultural impact and legacy ==
The album catapulted Fito & Fitipaldis to popularity, marking a turning point in their career. Several of its songs, such as "Soldadito marinero" or "Por la boca vive el pez" ("The fish lives through its mouth"), a preview of their next album, have become modern Spanish rock anthems. In retrospective lists and critics' polls, it often appears among the best Spanish albums of its time.

It has also been considered by some magazines to be one of the best albums in Spanish history.

== Reception ==
Professional ratings
Review scores
Source	Rating
Allmusic	4/5 stars

Lo más lejos a tu lado has received very positive reviews. Rolling Stone Spain claimed that is their best album and also was ranked number 26 on Rolling Stone's "50 Greatest Spanish rock albums".

== Track listing ==
No.	Title	Length
1.	"La casa por el tejado (ft. Lichis from La Cabra Mecánica)"	4:30
2.	"Un buen castigo"	4:40
3.	"Feo"	4:55
4.	"El ojo que me mira"	3:10
5.	"Soldadito Marinero"	4:15
6.	"Corazón oxidado"	4:01
7.	"Quiero ser una estrella (Los Rebeldes cover)"	3:22
8.	"Nada que decir"	3:02
9.	"Vamonó"	5:10
10.	"Las nubes de tu pelo"	3:30
11.	"Whisky barato"	3:20
12.	"Siempre estoy soñando"	4:16

== Personnel ==
=== Main musicians ===
- Fito Cabrales – lead vocals (all songs except "Vamonó"), electric guitar (all songs), guitarra acústica (3–5, 6, 9)
- José Alberto Batiz – electric guitar (all songs except 9 and 10), slide guitar (2–4, 12), backing vocals (1, 4, 6, 7, 11, 12), classical guitar, harmonica and mouth harp (9)
- Javier Alzola – saxophone (1–3, 6–9, 11), backing vocals (1, 4, 6, 8)
- Chema "Animal" Pérez – drums (1, 2, 4, 6, 7, 11)
- Roberto Caballero – bass (all songs except "Vamonó" and "Las nubes de tu pelo")
- Javier Mora – piano (1–3, 6, 9, 12)

=== Extra musicians ===
- Lichis – bass in "Vamonó" and voice at the end of La casa por el tejado
- Olga Román – backing vocals (3–6, 12)
- Joseba Tapia – diatonic accordion in "Whisky barato"
- Iñaki Antón – trombone in "Corazón oxidado" and electric guitar solo in "Feo"
- Gino Pavone – percussion (1–6, 9, 11, 12), drums (3, 5, 8, 9, 12)
- Melatocas Enelfaro – street percussion in "Vamonó"
- Aiert Ercoreca – piano in "Quiero ser una estrella"
- DJ Veneno – turntable scratching in "Vamonó" and mixing and effects in "Corazón oxidado"

== Chart performance ==
Chart (2003)	Peak position
Spanish Albums Chart	19

== Certifications ==
Region	Certification	Certified units/sales
Spain (Promusicae)	5× Platinum	500,000^{^}
^{^} Shipments figures based on certification alone.
