= DRO Records =

Spanish record label; Spain's first indie record label

DRO
- Parent company: Warner Music Group
- Founded: 1982
- Founder: Aviador Dro
- Distributors: Pancoca (1982–1983); Grabaciones Accidentales (1983–1984)
- Genre: alternative rock
- Country of origin: Spain
- Location: Madrid

DRO Records (often referred to simply as DRO) is a Spanish independent record label founded in 1982 by members of the band Aviador Dro. It is one of Spain's first independent record labels. During the 1980s DRO was an important label for independent artists in Spain, especially in Madrid.

== Name ==
DRO is an acronym which stands for Discos Radioactivos Organizados (English: Organized Radioactive Records). In the 1990s, the multinational label Eastwest Records acquired DRO. Following the acquisition the label was renamed DRO EastWest.

== History ==
DRO Records was founded in Spain in 1982 by members of the band Aviador Dro. The label, which was one of the earliest independent labels in Spain, was created in order to give the band the resources to publish their music after being rejected by major labels. At the time, alternative music was emerging in Spain, especially around Madrid. DRO and other independent labels helped alternative artists distribute their music to wider audiences in the 1980s. Because of its role as a label for important artists during this time, the label has been called a pioneer of Spanish independent music. Many of the most successful Spanish artists of the 1980s were signed to DRO.

In 1983, following the collapse of DRO's distributor, Pancoca, the independent label Grabaciones Accidentales (GASA) began handling DRO's distribution. GASA was absorbed into DRO in the following year. DRO also acquired another independent label, Twins, in 1989.

The DRO-GASA group was ultimately acquired by Warner Music Group in 1993 due to financial pressures. The label current operates as DRO EastWest, SA.

== See also ==
- List of record labels
