= Balaídos Stadium =

Football stadium in Vigo, Spain

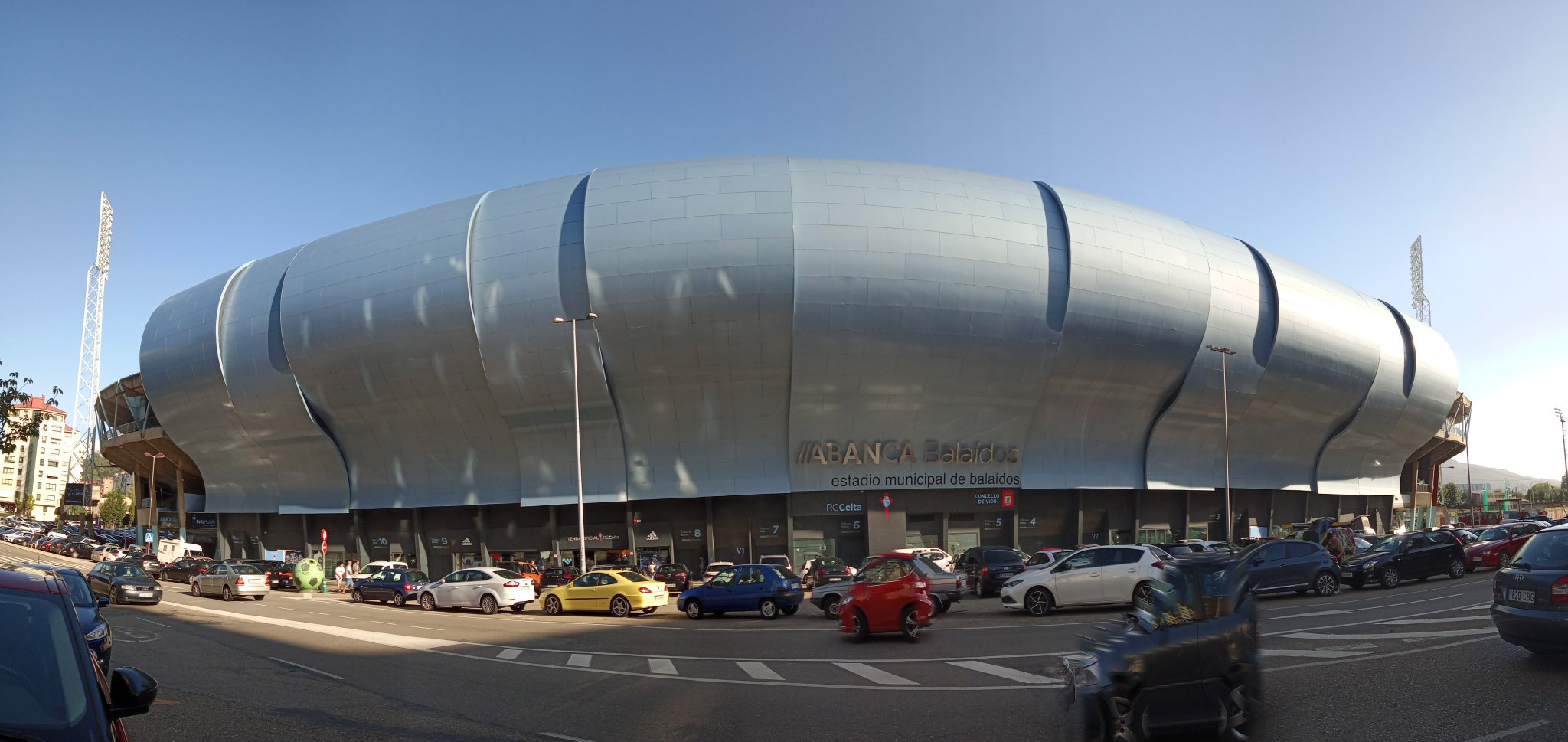
- Balaídos in 2020
- Interactive map of Balaídos Stadium
- Full name: Estadio Municipal de Balaídos
- Former names: Stadium de Balaídos (1928–1946)
- Address: Avenida de Balaídos, s/n 36210 Vigo, Pontevedra
- Location: Vigo, Galicia, Spain
- Coordinates: 42.2118°N 8.7397°W
- Owner: Concello de Vigo
- Operator: Celta Vigo
- Capacity: 24,870
- Surface: Grass
- Record attendance: 45,000 (Celta Vigo vs Getafe, 16 May 1982)
- Field size: 105 m × 70 m (344 ft × 230 ft)

Construction
- Built: 1925–1928
- Opened: 30 December 1928
- Renovated: 2004, 2015–2018, 2021–2023, 2025–present
- Expanded: 1967, 1981–1982
- Architect: Jenaro de la Fuente
- General contractors: Stadium de Balaídos, S.A.

Tenants
- Celta Vigo (1928–present); Celta Fortuna (2022–present)

The Balaídos Stadium (Galician: Estadio Municipal de Balaídos; Galician pronunciation: [balaˈiðʊʃ]), known as Estadio Abanca Balaídos for sponsorship reasons, is an all-seater stadium located in Vigo, Spain. It is owned by the Vigo's city council, and is the home of La Liga club Celta Vigo. The stadium opened in 1928 and currently accommodates 24,870 spectators.

== History ==
=== Construction ===
In September 1924, a group of local businessmen took the first steps towards the construction of the stadium by buying the 75,000 m^{2} on which the stadium would be built. The first job they faced was diverting the Lagares river. Two years later, the businessmen founded the Stadium de Balaídos, S.A. company, which would carry out the actual construction work on the new stadium. The architect of the stadium was Jenaro de la Fuente.

=== Inauguration ===
Balaídos was inaugurated on 30 December 1928. The stadium was blessed by the archpriest of Fragoso, Father Faustino Ande.

The inaugural match was played between the hosts, Celta Vigo, and the Basque team Real Unión. The ceremonial kick-off was made by Carmen Gregorio-Espino, the daughter of former mayor Adolfo Gregorio Espino. Celta Vigo's Graciliano was the first player to score a goal in the new stadium, in a 7–0 win.

=== Renovations ===
Balaídos underwent a large-scale renovation in preparation for the 1982 FIFA World Cup; The Rio stand was completely re-built, the Gol end was added to the stadium, and the Tribuna and Marcador stands were renovated.

==== 2003–2004 ====
After finishing in fourth place in the 2002–03 La Liga season, Celta qualified for the UEFA Champions League for the first time in their history. Their celebrations were cut short when the stadium failed the subsequent UEFA stadium inspection required to host their fixtures. It was briefly rumoured that Celta might have to play their home games at a different venue; however, the necessary upgrades were paid for by the local authorities.

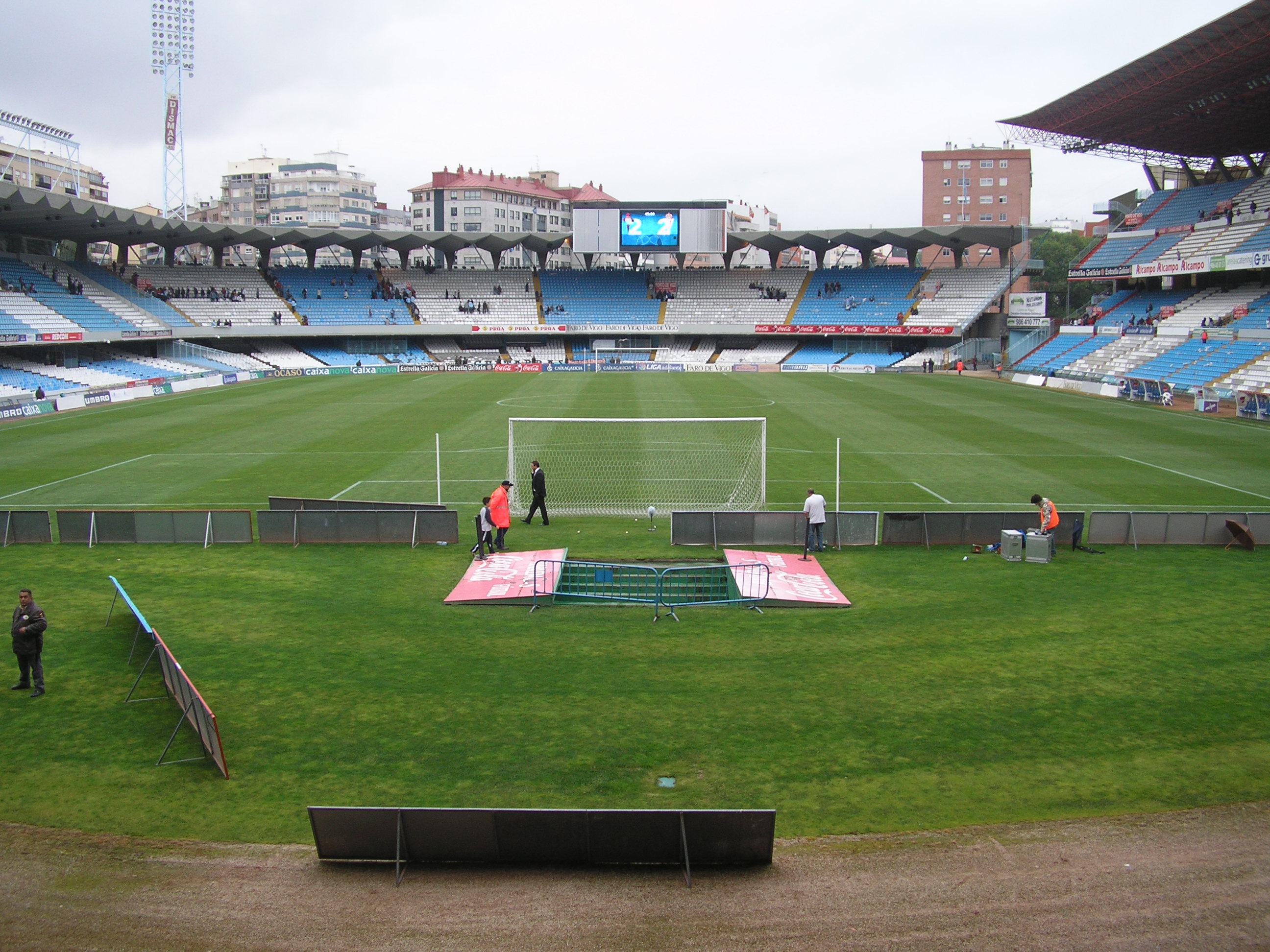
Balaídos in 2009, before the reconstruction

==== 2015–2023 ====
At the beginning of 2015, the reconstruction of the stadium began, divided into four phases corresponding to the four stands of the venue. In the first phase of the project, the front part of the Tribuna (North Stand) was moved three meters closer to the pitch, and the new changing rooms and private boxes were constructed. The Rio (South Stand) has been refurbished and includes new media facilities, and both stands also got new roofs. The reconstruction of both stands was completed by 2018. During the renovations, the stadium continued to host Celta's home matches.

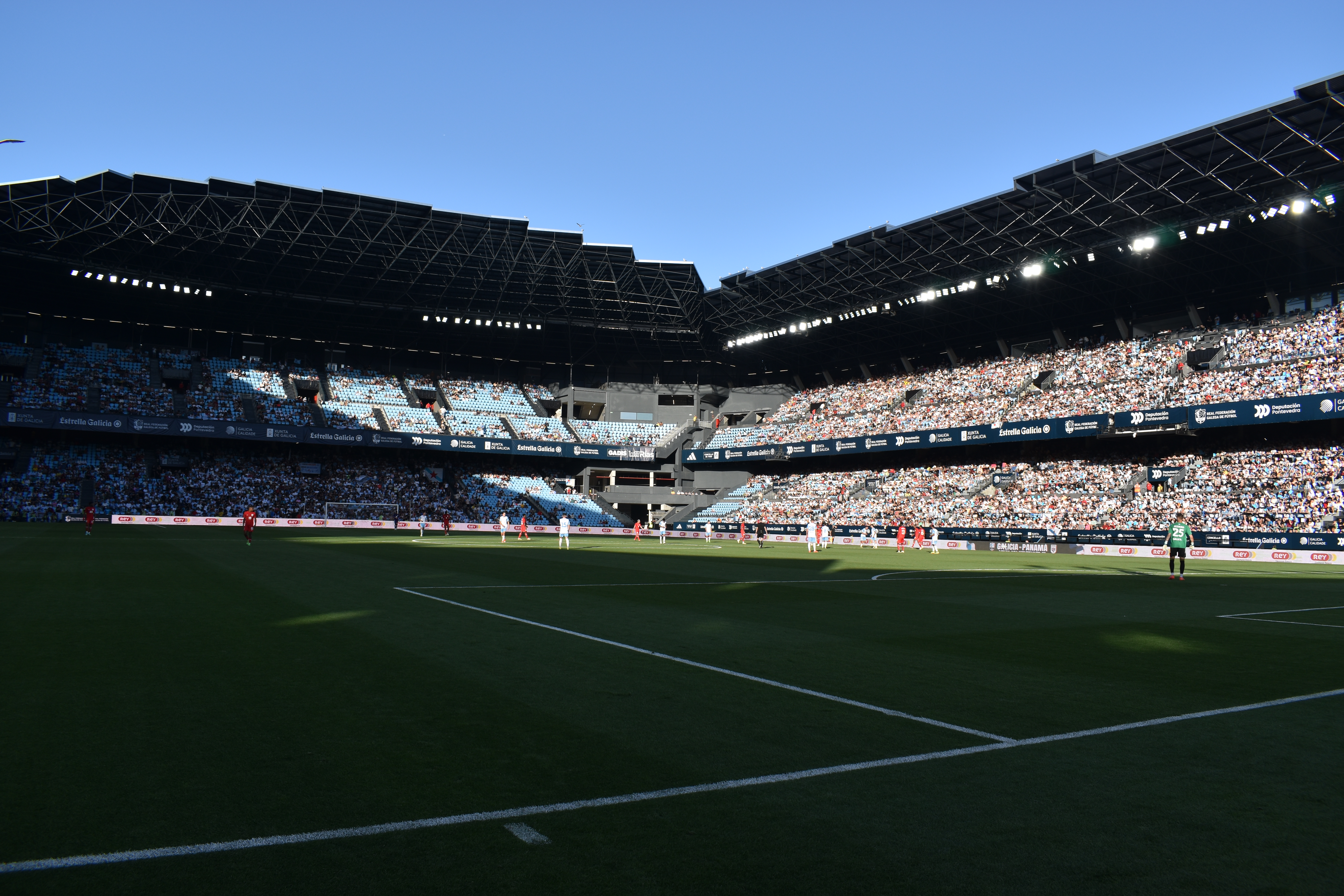
Interior of the stadium in 2024

The Marcador (East Stand) was completely reconstructed by 2023 and accommodates 6,209 spectators.

==== 2025–2026 ====
In April 2025, the fourth and final phase of Balaídos' redevelopment began with the reconstruction of the Gol (West Stand). The project included a new stand for over 7,000 spectators, improved spectator facilities, and a roof that matches the rest of the stadium. Completion is scheduled for the end of 2026, with a further expansion of the Tribuna Stand planned to increase capacity for the 2030 FIFA World Cup.

== International matches ==
=== Spain national team matches ===
Data	Opponent	Score	Competition
2 April 1933	Portugal	3–0	Friendly match
26 September 1979	Portugal	1–1	Friendly match
23 January 1980	Netherlands	1–0	Friendly match
19 January 1994	Portugal	2–2	Friendly match
25 March 1998	Sweden	4–0	Friendly match
13 November 1999	Brazil	0–0	Friendly match
18 November 2014	Germany	0–1	Friendly match

=== 1982 FIFA World Cup ===
The stadium hosted three group matches at the 1982 FIFA World Cup.

14 June 1982	Italy	0–0	Poland
17:15 CEST		(Report)		Attendance: 33,000; Referee: Michel Vautrot (France)

18 June 1982	Italy	1–1	Peru
17:15 CEST	Conti 18'	(Report)	Díaz 83'	Attendance: 25,000; Referee: Walter Eschweiler (West Germany)

23 June 1982	Italy	1–1	Cameroon
17:15 CEST	Graziani 60'	(Report)	Mbida 61'	Attendance: 20,000; Referee: Bogdan Dotchev (Bulgaria)

== Other uses ==
Balaídos has hosted concerts on several occasions.

The first ever concert held at Balaídos took place on 26 August 1983, when Miguel Ríos performed as part of his El Rock de una noche de verano tour. He was supported by Rosendo Mercado's band Leño, and Luz Casal. On 29 July 1990, as part of her Blond Ambition World Tour, Madonna performed at the stadium with Siniestro Total as the opening act in front of 20,000 people. Madonna sang several tracks while wearing Celta's shirt.

In July 1992, Festival Afroamérica took place in Vigo for two days, and featured artist such as B.B. King, Celia Cruz, Dr. John, Gilberto Gil, Milton Nascimento, Tito Puente, Tracy Chapman and Willy Deville. On 1 August 1992, Julio Iglesias performed in front of 12,000 spectators. In the same month, Dire Straits performed in front of 40,000 spectators.

On 4 July 1998, A Roda, Astarot, Milladoiro and Carlos Santana performed in front of 12,000 spectators as part of Celta's 75th anniversary. On 18 July 1998, as part of the Bridges to Babylon Tour, The Rolling Stones performed in front of a crowd of 35,000.

On 21 July 2001, Alejandro Sanz performed in front of 15,000 spectators. On 10 September 2022, British band Muse performed at the stadium, with The Killer Barbies and Years & Years as opening acts, in front of 17,000 spectators. The concert was part of several performances organized by Xunta de Galicia across the autonomous community.
