= Radio Exitosa =

Peruvian radio station

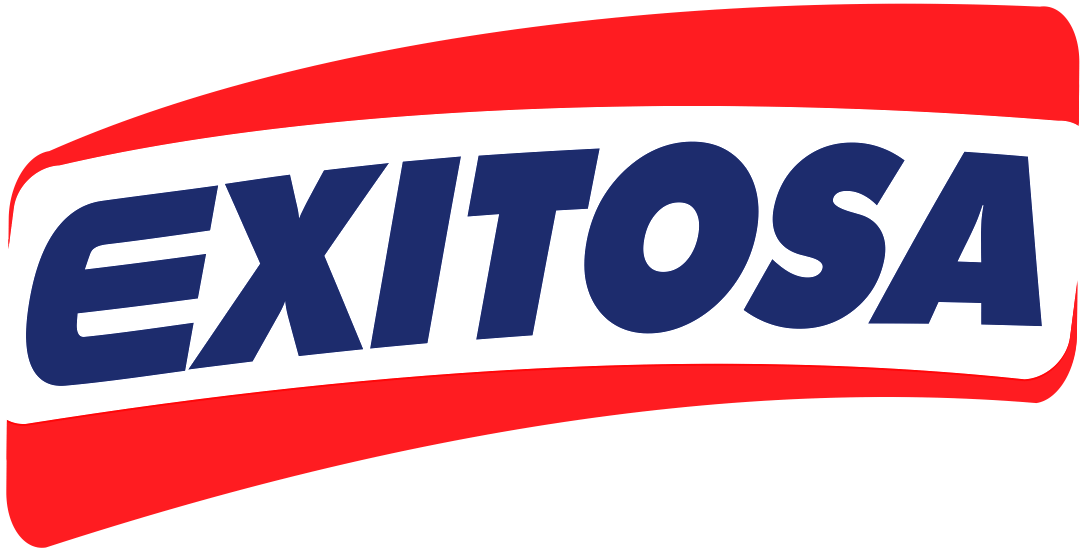
- Country: Peru
- Headquarters: Lima, Peru

Programming
- Language(s): Spanish

Ownership
- Owner: Corporación Universal
- Sister stations: Radio Karibeña; Radio La Kalle; Radio Zeta Rock & Pop

History
- Launch date: 2004

Links
- Webcast: Listen live
- Website: www.exitosanoticias.pe

Radio Exitosa is a Peruvian radio network headquartered in Lima, owned by Corporación Universal, which also operates Radio Karibeña and Radio Zeta Rock & Pop. Its main station in Lima broadcasts on 95.5 MHz, and the network is present in over 60 cities.

== History ==
Radio Exitosa began broadcasting in Chiclayo in 2004, initially as La Exitosa, with an eclectic music format that included salsa, cumbia, merengue, vallenato, and techno, as well as news inserts. After achieving success, it expanded to other provinces. In 2008, it shifted its focus to news content and adopted the name Exitosa Noticias. In 2010, it entered the Lima market, initially on 96.1 MHz (acquired from Radio Miraflores) before switching with sister station La Kalle and moving to the more powerful 95.5 MHz facility.

Starting in 2011, the station adopted a hybrid format of news and Spanish ballads from the 1970s and 1980s, targeting an adult audience. Faced with a ratings decline, it gradually incorporated Andean music to broaden its reach in the country's interior regions. In 2013, Exitosa dropped music programming to become an all-news and talk station.

In 2014, the station expanded its presence to television with the launch of the digital channel Exitosa TV. In the following years, there were brief returns of music programming in overnight hours, though the station returned to all-talk in 2017 and again in 2018.

In October 2024, Radio Exitosa replaced Radio Satélite on 100.7 MHz from Callao.

== Audience and editorial perspective ==
In 2020, Radio Exitosa reached an estimated weekly audience of 2.95 million listeners, according to CPI data. The station's team includes journalists from diverse political backgrounds, among them former Fujimorism affiliates, such as the well-known journalist Nicolás Lúcar, who was previously associated with media executive José Enrique Crousillat and investor Ernesto Flores Vilchez. In 2023, the Reuters Institute for the Study of Journalism noted that Exitosa's editorial perspective shows tendencies toward left-wing populism.
