= Juliana Oxenford =

Peruvian journalist, television and radio presenter

- Born: María Juliana Oxenford Tuja; 28 December 1978 (age 47); Buenos Aires, Argentina
- Occupations: Journalist; television presenter; radio presenter
- Spouse: Milovan Radovic (m. 2018)
- Children: 2

María Juliana Oxenford Tuja (born 28 December 1978) is an Argentine-born Peruvian journalist, television and radio presenter.

== Biography ==
=== Early life and education ===
Oxenford was born in Buenos Aires on 28 December 1978, the daughter of Argentine actor Marcelo Oxenford and his first wife, the Argentine journalist Liliana Tuja. She moved with her parents to Peru when she was three years old. Oxenford also has a half-sister named Lucia. She studied Communication Sciences at the University of San Martín de Porres, where she obtained a bachelor's degree.

=== Career ===
At the age of eighteen, Oxenford began working as a sports reporter for ATV. She did reports for América Televisión, and they hired her to be the presenter of the Buenos Días, Perú block of shows. In 2004, she began in investigative and political journalism by working with César Hildebrandt in the program En la boca del lobo. She hosted the radio show Arde Troya on Radio Planeta. In 2006, she joined the journalistic program Día D, broadcast by ATV and hosted by Nicolás Lúcar. She hosted the morning newscast Primer reporte, on ATV.

Oxenford joined the group of journalists from Lúcar's new program, Punto final, por Latina, where she worked until 2011. From 2012 to 2016, she hosted the interview program Al estilo Juliana, on RPP TV, and she hosted the Informativo capital radio program on Radio Capital. From January 2017 to December 2019, she presented the news program 90 central, por Latina. From October 2018 to November 2019, she hosted the program Las cosas por la nombre de ella, on Radio Exitosa. In 2020, she rejoined ATV, where she hosts the ATV news program: Al estilo Juliana.

== Personal life ==
Oxenford and her partner, publicist Milovan Radovic, became parents in April 2013. On 1 December 2018, Oxenford married Radovic.
