= Raúl Celis =

Raúl Celis may refer to:

- Raúl Celis López (1954–2025), murdered Peruvian journalist
- Raúl Celis Montt (born 1962), Chilean businessman and politician
- Raul Sanzotti (Raúl Celis Sanzotti) (born 1975), Argentine footballer
