= Radio A La Radio del Amor =

Radio "A"
Lima, Peru; Peru
- Broadcast area: Peru
- Frequency: 94.9 MHz

Programming
- Format: Romantic music
- Affiliations: Sociedad Nacional de Radio y Televisión (SNRTV)

Ownership
- Owner: Grupo Emisoras Perú
- Sister stations: Radio Retro Perú; Radio Boleros Inolvidables; Radio La Ñ 100.1; Radio Del Amor

History
- First air date: February 14, 1984
- Former call signs: OCZ-4T FM (Lima)

Technical information
- Class: Commercial

Links
- Website: https://radioa.fmlima.com

Radio "A" La Radio del Amor (The Radio of Love) was a radio station owned by Corporación Aeropuerto Inc., which broadcast its FM signal and was later acquired by Grupo Emisoras Perú via the internet through its official website from Peru to the entire world. Radio A was characterized by its unique style of promoting boleros and ballads from the 70s, 80s, 90s, and present-day Peru.

== History ==
=== First years ===
Its founder and owner, Dr. Dagoberto Láinez, politician and broadcaster of the History of the Radio in Peru. Radio A, radiostation which appeared on Valentine's Day in 1984, initially on 95.1 MHz of the FM, and after on 94.9 MHz of the FM Stereo. In the beginning the station played on Boleros, then Dance Music and finally consolidating itself at Romantic Ballads in Spanish first in uninterrupted way without locutions until 1985, in with the slogan "La Hispanoamericana del Dial" ("The Hispanic American of the Dial"), the DJ's staff of the broadcasting station was formed with Carlos Cabrera, Doris Camino, Julio Mayo, Elio Tello and Paco Espinoza. In that year, Mónica Delta, Mario Guimarey and Agatha Lys also passed through Radio A's microphones.

=== Peak age ===
Radio A became a strong competitor of RBC La Estación FM which also played on Ballads in Spanish. At the beginning of November 1990 it was that the direct competence of Radio A which is Ritmo Romántica with the same format in music has appeared. The broadcasting radiostation was the standard-bearer of the radial group that was conformed with Sabor Mix 95.5 MHz (then by 8 December 1997 changed for Z Rock & Pop) and R-700 La Grande ("The Big") on 700 kHz.

=== Controversy with RBC ===
Towards the end of 1986, Radio A Excelente was a youth station which took a few months on air with the very young announcers staff commanded by the remembered Julio Mayo. After a short period of broadcasting continued music without interruptions, the radiostation executives thought as acceptable to innovate the FM with new voices (among the ones that was found on this server). Until then, the audience of the radiostation was very poor, in part by the ignorance of its existence by part of the public and by the overpower supremacy of RBC La Estación, a leader radiostation in difussionate uniquely Spanish music in an age of strong influence of the Anglo-Saxon music.

=== The end of the radiostation ===
Nothing made it indicate that the radiostation would reach its final on 11 November 2007 (day of Radio A's last broadcasting); on the next day at 00:00 hrs, it would change the musical rhythm and it would give way to a new radial project that weeks later would be Radiomix. Some of its DJ's became part of its sister station Z Rock & Pop except Carlos Quinto, who stayed in the same booth with most of Z Rock & Pop's DJ's who left that for the brand-new station.

== Programs and sequences ==
Radio A has been characterised on bringing pleasure to the audience with these programs, as well as sequences:

- Estrellas al Amanecer (Stars at Dawning) (with Oskar Campos)
- Bienvenidos El Estelar de la Música en Español // Duelo de Estrellas (with Paco Espinoza)
- Tu Maratón Musical (Your Musical Marathon) (with Ylda Bravo, then Soffy Escurra)
- Lo Mejor de Tu Vida (The Best of Your Life) (with Felipe Alfredo and Carmen Ruidías)
- Sólo Pedidos (Only Orders)
- Especiales (Specials)
- Música y Noticias (Music and News) (with Junior Vásquez)
- Billboard Latino (Latin Billboard) (with Junior Vásquez)
- El Horóscopo del Día (The Horoscope of the Day)
- Un Momento con las Secretarias (One Moment with Secretaries) (with Roy Salazar, then Michael Phun)
- A Mil por Hora (A Mile a Minute) (with Juliana Oxenford)
- Lo Mejor de Mundo del Espectáculo (The Best of the World of the Spectacle) (with Juliana Oxenford)
- Las 10 Principales (The 10 Principals)
  Daily countdown with the most requested ballads.
- Ruta 949 (949 Route) (with César Bernales)
- Sintonía de Amor (Tune of Love) (with Marco Antonio Vásquez)
  Monday to Friday 22:00
- Escape en la Radio (Scape on the Radio) (with Bruno Pinasco)
- Ranking de la Semana: Las 10 Principales (Ranking of the Week: The 10 Principals) (with Juliana Oxenford)
  A weekly countdown with the ballads of the moment.
  Saturday 12:00–14:00
- Especial (Special) (with César Bernales)
  Half an hour of an artist or group.
  Saturday 16:00–16:30
- Atrapados en la Noche (Caught Up in the Night) (with DJ Tavo)
  Saturday 21:00
- Sólo Recuerdos (Only Memories)
  Sunday 04:00–06:00
- De Retorno a los 70 y 80 (Back to the 70's and 80's) (with Roy Salazar)
  Sunday 06:00–10:00
- Descubre Tu Futuro con Mario Salazar (Discover Your Future with Mario Salazar)
  Saturday 08:00–09:00
- Artistas por Partida Doble (Artists with Double-Entry) (with Roy Salazar)
  Sunday 07:00–10:00
- El Invitado en un Domingo con lo Mejor de Tu Vida (The Guest on Sunday with the Best of Your Life) (with Michael Phun)
  Sunday 14:00-18:00
- A la Franca (The Frank) (with Martín Sánchez)
  Sunday 22:00
- De a Dos (Of Two) (with Juliana Oxenford and Roy Salazar)
  Saturday 10:00–12:00
- Entre Sábanas (Between Sheets) (with Cecilia and Enrique)
  Monday to Friday 02:00–04:00
- El Especial de: Lo Mejor de Tu Vida (The Special of: The Best of Your Life)
- Entre Nosotras (Between Us)
- A Tu Estilo (At Your Style) (with Malena Rospigliosi)
  Monday to Friday 16:00-16:30
- Luces, Música, Acción (Lights, Music, Action) (with Malena Rospigliosi)
  Monday to Friday 18:00–19:00
- Sólo Noventas (Only 90's) (with Karla Fernández)
- En la Intimidad (In the Intimacy)
  Sequence of Sintonía de Amor with Dr. Bruno Zanolo which went from 22:00 to 00:00.
- Contacto con Mario Salazar (Contact with Mario Salazar)
  Saturday 08:00-09:00
- Buenas Nuevas (Good News) (with Héctor Felipe and Mario Salazar) Monday to Friday 06:00–10:00
- Rumbo a Casa (Way Back Home)
  Monday to Friday 18:00-19:00
- Casos y Cosas del Amor (Cases and Things of Love) (with Carmen Ruidías and Malena Rospigliosi)
- El Ranking de Radio A, La Radio del Amor (The Ranking of Radio A, The Radio of Love)
- Las Pre-seleccionadas a los 20 Años del Amor (The Pre-selected Ones for the 20 Years of Love)
  Countdown of the pre-selected hits for the 20 years of the radiostation.
- Las Seleccionadas a los 20 Años del Amor (The Selected Ones for the 20 Years of Love)
  Countdown of the selected hits for the 20th anniversary of the broadcasting station.
- Sencillamente Frieda (Simply Frieda) (with Mrs. Frieda Holler)
  Sequence of Entre Nosotras which went from Monday to Friday from 12:00 to 12:30.
- Buena Onda (Good Wave)
- Nueva Generación (New Generation)
- Numerología con Mario Salazar (Numerology with Mario Salazar)
  Sequence of Sintonía de Amor which went on Monday, Wednesday and Friday from 22:00 to 00:00.
- Los Nuevos Clásicos (The New Classics) (with Michael Phun)
  Saturday 06:00–08:00
- El Especial de Lo Mejor de Tu Vida (The Special of The Best of Your Life)
- Tus Mejores Canciones de Amor (Your Best Love Songs)
- A Calzón Quitao (At Underpants Off) (with Alessandra Rampolla)
  Monday to Friday 00:00–01:00
- Con Sello de Mujer (With Woman's Stamp) (with Martha Medina)
- Duelo de Estrellas (Stars' Duel) (with Karla Fernández)
  Saturday 12:00–13:00
- Los Clásicos del Amor (The Classics of Love)
- Clase 949 (949 Class)
- El Diario de Carmen (Carmen's Diary) (with Carmen Ruidías)
- El Escape (The Scape)
- Cómplices (Accomplices) (with Carlos Quinto and Katherine Schaeffer)
  Saturday 18:00-22:00
- Lectura de Cartas (Reading of Cards) (with Angélica Figueroa)

== Presenters ==
Radio A has been characterised for being a broadcasting station with fresh voices. Always with professionalism. Later on, the relation of presenters, announcers or DJ's who passed through the radiostation's booths:

=== 1984–1989 ===
- Paco Espinoza (1984–1994)
- Elías Bautista (1984–1989)
- Carlos Cabrera (1985–1987)
- Doris Camino (1985–1987)
- Julio Mayo (1985–1986, 1987)
- Elio Tello (1985–1988)
- Mónica Delta (1985–1986)
- Mario Guimarey (1985–1986)
- Agatha Lys (1985–1986)
- Yolvi Traverso (1985–1990, 1997-1998)
- Marco Antonio Vásquez (1998–2007)
- Richard Romero (1986–1992)
- Leo Ramírez Lazo (1984–1996)
- Ylda Bravo (1984–1993)
- Soffy Escurra (1989–1994, 1998-2000)
- Yadhira Álvarez (1988–2000)
- Katherine Schaeffer (1988, 2007)
- Jesús Cueva (1988–1998)
- Pepe Ponce (1989–1992)

=== 1990–1999 ===
- Rocky Rodríguez (1990–1993)
- Carlos Sánchez (1990–1994)
- Rubén Raffo (1990–1994)
- Silvia Verano (1991–1998)
- Jéssica Aguilar (1991–2001)
- Luigi Santana (1992–1994)
- Martín Acha (1990–1993)
- Carlos Fernández (1991–1993)
- Randy Calandra (1991–1993)
- César Bernales (1992–2003)
- Hibar Saldaña (1992–1998, 2007)
- Víctor Tejada (1994–1996)
- José Luis Romero (1994–1998)
- Rossana Ivonne (1995–1997)
- Carolina Cossio (1994–1996)
- Rafo Pereira (1994–1995)
- Eddy Rodríguez (1995–1998)
- Ricardo Ascencio (1995–1998, 1999-2001)
- Richard Roque (1995–2000)
- Carmen Ruidías (1996–2007)
- Juan Carlos Hurtado (1997)
- Willy Chilón Ventura (1997–2000)
- Felipe Alfredo Maguiña (1998–2003)
- Mario Arroyo (1998–1999)
- Arturo Otoya (d. 2014) (1999)

=== 2000–2007 ===
- Roy Salazar (2000–2003)
- Junior Vásquez (2000–2001, 2002)
- Leticia (2000)
- Lucía Pacheco (2001–2004)
- Bruno Pinasco (2002)
- Juliana Oxenford (2002–2003)
- Martín Sánchez (2002–2003, 2005–2007)
- Michael Phun (2002–2007)
- Mario Salazar (2002–2004)
- Myrian (2003)
- Malena Rospigliosi (2003–2005)
- Karla Fernández (2003–2007)
- Cecilia (2004)
- Enrique Iglesias (2004, 2005)
- Héctor Felipe (2004–2007)
- Romy Salinas (2004–2005)
- Angélica Figueroa (2005–2007)
- Carlos Quinto (2005–2007)
- Martha Medina (2005–2007)
- Alessandra Rampolla (2006)

== Frequencies ==
City	Call sign	Frequency	ERP	Period
Abancay	OAT-5F FM	93.3 MHz	250 W	-2007
Andahuaylas	OCT-5K FM	100.3 MHz	500 W	2003-2007
Arequipa	OAT-6V FM	104.9 MHz	1 kW	1996-2007
Ayacucho	OAT-5H FM	97.3 MHz	500 W	2000-2007
Barranca	OCR-4J FM	95.3 MHz	1 kW	2000-2007
Cajamarca	OCW-2Y FM	103.3 MHz	1 kW	1995-2007
Cañete	OAR-4Y FM	97.7 MHz	1 kW	2007
Cañete	OBR-4K FM	99.9 MHz	1 kW	1998-2007
Cerro de Pasco	OBT-4W FM	98.5 MHz	1 kW	-2007
Chachapoyas	OCW-9P FM	95.5 MHz	1 kW	1997-2007
Chiclayo	OCW-1Z FM	106.9 MHz	2 kW	1995-2007
Chimbote	OCT-3X FM	90.9 MHz	1 kW	1998-2007
Chincha	OCR-5B FM	100.5 MHz	1 kW	-2003
Chincha	OCW-5U FM	99.9 MHz	250 W	2003-2007
Chulucanas	OAT-1A FM	96.9 MHz	250 W	2003-2007
Cusco	OCW-7F FM	88.3 MHz	500 W	1993-2007
Huacho	OBQ-4Q FM	90.9 MHz	1 kW	-2003, 2005-2007
Huacho	OAT-4U FM	96.1 MHz	1 kW	2003-2005
Huancavelica	OAT-5J FM	94.3 MHz	250 W	-2007
Huancayo	OBW-4L FM	95.1 MHz	1 kW	1995-2007
Huánuco	OCT-3G FM	91.9 MHz	250 W	1996-2007
Huaral	OAR-4B FM	91.3 MHz	250 W	1998-2009
Huaraz	OCT-3F FM	107.3 MHz	1 kW	-2007
Ica	OCZ-5X FM	94.7 MHz	1 kW	1995-2007
Ilo	OCT-6H FM	99.9 MHz	250 W	1995-2009
Iquitos	OCW-8J FM	92.5 MHz	1 kW	1995-2007
Jaén	OCT-2S FM	93.3 MHz	1 kW	2003-2007
Juliaca	OCW-7X FM	94.9 MHz	1 W	1995-2007
Lima	OCZ-4T FM	95.1 MHz	20 kW	1984-1993
Lima	OCZ-4T FM	94.9 MHz	20 kW	1993-2007
Mollendo	OCW-6A FM	100.7 MHz	250 W	-2007
Moquegua	OBT-6L FM	99.3 MHz	1 kW	2003-2007
Moyobamba	OAT-9Y FM	88.3 MHz	1 kW	2002-2007
Pisco	OBT-5Q FM	94.9 MHz	1 kW	1998-2007
Piura	OCW-1Y FM	90.7 MHz	2 kW	1995-2007
Pucallpa	OCW-8K FM	94.5 MHz	1 kW	1995-2007
Puerto Maldonado	OAT-7X FM	102.7 MHz	1 kW	1997-2007
Puno	OAT-7M FM	89.5 MHz	1 kW	2003-2007
Rioja	OCZ-9U FM	92.3 MHz	250 W	1995-2001
Sicuani	OAK-7P FM	100.3 MHz	500 W	2003-2007
Sullana	OCT-1P FM	91.3 MHz	700 W	1997-2007
Tacna	OBW-6T FM	102.1 MHz	250 W	1986-2007
Talara	OCZ-1J FM	92.7 MHz	250 W	1997-2007
Tarapoto	OCW-9U FM	95.1 MHz	1 kW	1995-2007
Tarma	OBO-4B FM	104.9 MHz	500 W	1993-2006
Tingo María	OAT-3R FM	94.9 MHz	300 W	-2007
Trujillo	OAT-2A FM	103.3 MHz	1 kW	-2007
Tumbes	OCW-1X FM	94.3 MHz	1 kW	1995-2007
Yurimaguas	OBW-8X FM	89.3 MHz	250 W	2000-2007

== Slogans ==
Period	Slogan
1984-2000	Excelente (Excellent): 1984-1990 La Hispanoamericana del Dial (The Hispanic American Station of the Dial); 1991-1993 De Película (As a Movie); 1997-2000 Excelente… La Radio del Amor (Excellent… The Radio of Love)
2000-2007	La Primera y la Mejor Radio Romántica (The First and the Best Romantic Radiostation)
2000-2025	La Radio del Amor (The Radio of Love): 2004 20 años de amor (20 years of love) (anniversary); 2005-2006 Déjate enamorar con Radio A (Let yourself fall in love with Radio A); 2005-2006 Vuélvete a enamorar con Radio A (Let yourself fall in love again with Radio A); 2007 La Radio Joven del Amor (The Youth Radio of Love); 2025 La Radio del Amor (The Radio of Love)

== See also ==
- List of radio stations in Peru
- Media of Peru
