= El Río =

El Río may refer to:

== Places ==
- El Rio, California, U.S.
- El Rio Villa, California, U.S.
- El Río (es), barrio of Las Piedras, Puerto Rico
- El Río (es), in San Cristóbal de La Laguna, Tenerife, Spain
- El Río (es), in San Millán de la Cogolla, La Rioja, Spain

== Books ==
- "El río" (es) 1964 story by Julio Cortázar

== Music ==
- El Rio (album), by Frankie Ballard 2016
- "El Río" (song), 1968 single which was first hit for Miguel Ríos
- "El Rio", song by Café Tacuba from Yo Soy

== Other ==
- El Rio, gay bar in San Francisco, California

== See also ==
- Rio (disambiguation)
- Los Ríos (disambiguation)
