= Rock urbano =

1970s Spanish musical movement

Rock Urbano (Spanish for Urban Rock) is a rock movement developed at mid 1970s in Spain. Initially influenced by hard rock acts and progressive rock bands, in the 1980s punk rock influences were added as well. Their lyrics deal about social and marginal problems. They standarized the usage of Spanish as the dominant language in the local rock scene.

Thus, in groups like Leño were influenced by hard rock and blues rock, in others as Barricada, the heavy metal and punk, while in groups like Extremoduro and Marea performs a rock with poetic lyrics, however, they retain the rawness in the vocals.

Besides, in bands such as Fito & Fitipaldis or Albertucho there are included a mixture of musical influences. The phenomenon arises in the 1970s, with bands like Burning, Asphalt, Topo and, above all, Leño. These bands started to differentiate from the rest of the other because of their lyrics deal. In the following years, some of the leading Rock Urbano acts were Barricada, Los Suaves, Extremoduro, Platero y Tú, Reincidentes or Rosendo.

Notable urban rock bands:

- 70s: Leño, Asfalto, Topo, Burning
- 80s: Los Suaves, Barricada, Rosendo, Leize
- 90s: Extremoduro, Platero y Tú, Reincidentes, The Flying Rebollos, Quijotes Urbanos, Porretas, Desastre, Canallas, Transfer, Kalean
- 00s: La Fuga, Marea, Fito & Fitipaldis, Poncho K, Albertucho, Sínkope, Mala Reputación, Tensa Espera..., Silencio Absoluto, Diagnóstico Canalla.

In various Latin American countries similar movements exist. For example, in Mexico City there is a large Rock Urbano scene with bands such as El Tri, Interpuesto (Historia de un Minuto), El Haragán (A esa gran velocidad), Hazel, Banda Bostik, Sam Sam, Heavy Nopal, Perro Callejero and Barrio Pobre. Urban poet / singer-songwriter Rodrigo (Rockdrigo) González is considered one of the most important forefathers of the current Rock urbano bands in Mexico, he died during the September 19, 1985 earthquake in Mexico City; González bequeathed rock urban hymns such as Metro Balderas.
