= Ñu =

Spanish rock band

- Origin: Madrid, Spain
- Genres: Hard rock; progressive rock; celtic rock; folk rock; heavy metal
- Years active: 1974–present
- Label: Chapa/Zafiro
- Members: José Carlos Molina; Ramón Álvarez; Nacho de Carlos; Peter Mayer; Javi Arnaiz "Bumper"

Ñu, also known as José Carlos Molina-Ñu, are a Spanish hard rock band formed in 1974 in Madrid. Their music style, often described as medieval rock, has medieval music, celtic rock and heavy metal influences. The band have experienced multiple line-up changes, with vocalist José Carlos Molina being the only constant presence in the band through the years. The flute predominance in their sound has been compared with Jethro Tull's style, but playing a way heavier sound they are in fact a predecessor of folk metal. As time went by, their style tended to be less folk and more heavy. Their lyrics usually are about medieval castles, riders, villains and heroes.

== History ==
Initially formed in 1972 as Fresa, they decided to change the band's name in 1974, so the new band would be called Ñu. Their first record was the single "Que nadie escape de la evolución / Volando en sociedad" released with band's no permission two years later. The discrepancies between Rosendo Mercado and Molina caused that Rosendo leave the band in order to form a new one, Leño. Continuous line-up changes (up to sixty different musicians have participated throughout his discography) have been related to the character of the leader, described by a critic as "irascible, self-sufficient and undiplomatic".

== Members ==
- José Carlos Molina (vocals, flute, guitar, violin)
- Rosendo Mercado (guitar, 1974–77)
- Juan Almarza (bass, 1974–76)
- Felipe Salinas (drums, 1974–76)
- Chiqui Mariscal (bass, 1976–77, 1981–84)
- Ramiro Penas (drums, 1976–77)
- José María García [aka Sini] (guitar, 1978–79)
- Jean François André (violin, 1978–80)
- Jorge Calvo (bass, 1978–80)
- Enrique Ballesteros (drums, 1978–79, 1985–91)
- Raúl Garrido (drums, 1979–80)
- Eduardo Pinilla (guitar, 1979–80, 1984–85, 1988)
- Jerónimo Ramiro (guitar, 1981–84, 1988–91)
- Miguel Ángel Collado (keyboards, 1981–85, 1988)
- Bernardo Ballester (drums, 1981–83, 1994–97)
- Bob Thackway (drums, 1983)
- Alejandro Colantonio (drums, 1984–85)
- José Luis Ajenjo (bass, 1984–85)
- José Luis Rodríguez (bass, 1985–88)
- Enrique Bertrán de Lis (guitar, 1985–88)
- Toni [aka El mago] (keyboards, 1985–86)
- Enrique Valiño (violin, 1987–88)
- Nicolás del Hierro [aka Niko] (bass, 1988–91)
- Carlos Kakutani (guitar, viola, 1992–94)
- Javier Rocaberti (bass, 1992–97)
- Luis García (drums, 1992–94)
- José Antonio Casal (guitar, 1994–97)
- Willie Sagone (drums, 1995)
- Miguel Lozano (bass, guitar, 1997–98)
- Juan Miguel Rodríguez (bass, keyboards, 1997–2002)
- Tony de Juan (guitar, 1997)
- Pedro Vela (guitar, 1997–2002)
- Jesús Sánchez (drums, 1997–99)
- Jorge Calvo (keyboards, flute, 1999–2002)
- Álvaro Tenorio (bass, 1995–97)
- Vesko Kountchev (viola, 1995–1999–Present)
- José Carlos Molina Jr. (drums, 1999–2000)
- Joaquín Arellano (drums, 2000)
- Gorka Jon Alegre (bass, 2002–)
- Francisco Javier Arnaiz [aka Bumper] (drums, 2002–)
- Manuel Arias (guitar, 2002–present)

== Discography ==
Studio albums

- Cuentos de ayer y de hoy (1978)
- A golpe de látigo (1979)
- Fuego (1983)
- Acorralado por ti (1984)
- El mensaje del mago (1987)
- Vamos al lío!! (1988)
- Dos años de destierro (1990)
- La danza de las mil tierras (1994)
- La taberna encantada (1997)
- Cuatro gatos (2000)
- Réquiem (2002)
- Títeres (2003)
- Viejos himnos para nuevos guerreros (2011)
- ... Y nadie escapó de la evolución (2011)
- Yo Estoy Vivo (2023)

Live albums

- No hay ningún loco (1986)
- Imperio de paletos (1992)
- La noche del juglar (1999)

Singles

- Que nadie escape de la evolución / Volando en sociedad (1976)
- Aquellos músicos fueron nosotros / La explosión del universo (1978)
- El flautista / Velocidad (1980)
- La bailarina / El hombre de fuego (1983)
- Más duro que nunca / Flor de metal (1983)
- Más, quiero más / Romance fantasma (1984)
- No hay ningún loco / El flautista (1986)
- Sé quien / La bailarina (1986)
- Amor en el cielo / Ella (1987)
- La saeta / Los ojos de la zíngara (1987)
- Manicomio / Robin Hood (1987)
- Una copa por un viejo amigo / Más, quiero más (1987)
- La granja del loco / El tren azul (1988)
- No te dejes ganar / Trovador de ciudad (1988)
- Tuboescape / Conjuros (1990)
- Imperio de paletos / Que nadie escape de la evolución (1992)
- La danza de las mil tierras / Ella / El teatro de la suerte (1994)

Compilation albums

- 1975-1995: Veinte años y un día (1995)
- Colección (2001)
- Esperando (2003)

== Bibliography ==
- Giner, Pedro (1995): Ñu: no te dejes ganar. Veinte años de resistencia, Vosa, ISBN 978-84-8218-013-7.
