= Radio Zeta Rock & Pop =

"Z" Rock & Pop
Lima, Peru; Peru
- Broadcast area: Peru
- Frequency: 91.5 MHz

Programming
- Format: Rock & Pop
- Affiliations: Sociedad Nacional de Radio y Televisión (SNRTV)

Ownership
- Owner: Corporación Universal
- Sister stations: R-700 (defunct); Radio A (defunct); Radiomix (defunct); Karibeña (active); La Kalle (active); Exitosa (active); Radio Amor (active); La Hot (defunct); Sabor Mix (active)

History
- First air date: 8 December 1997
- Former call signs: OCW-4Z FM (Lima, 1997-2009); OCR-4N FM (Lima, 2012); OCW-4U FM (Lima, 2015-2016)
- Call sign meaning: OAT-4F FM (Ventanilla, 2024-present)

Technical information
- Class: Commercial

Links
- Website: www.radioz.pe

Radio Zeta Rock & Pop (mostly known as "Z Rock & Pop" or simply as "Radio Z") is a most popular Peruvian rock and pop radio station in Peru. Z Rock & Pop characterises in broadcasting music from the 60's until 2020's and now at Rock & Pop format for 24 hours per day via internet. Actually it's the ownership of Monsefú's broadcaster Higinio Capuñay's Corporación Universal (Universal Corporation), since the broadcasting station was bought to the extinct Corporación Aeropuerto S.A. (Airport Corporation Inc.) where it belonged to with the departed radio stations like Radio A and R-700, both administrated by deceased politician and broadcaster Dr. Dagoberto Láinez.

== History ==
=== Antecedents ===
A broadcasting station of varied music called Sabor Mix occupied on 95.5 MHz, which belonged to the same Corporación Aeropuerto S.A. where it was along with Radio A and R-700, in which it had to be shut down because that station didn't sell. Therefore, the general manager Hugo Salazar Díaz, Mrs. Martha Díaz Láinez Widow's son, in a risky businessman outburst decided to change the format to the station to bet for something newfangled and quality.

Meanwhile, the announcer Juan Carlos Hurtado, who laboured at the Hispanic Music station (Radio A), welcomed the manager who demonstrated his concern about what he wanted a radial product that has quality, popularity and above all that gets to the A1 customers as he called them.

There were many things to do like making an announcers staff and select the themes that will give life to this new project and that they would be the principal protagonists of the radio station...thus Ninoska Cuba (Juan Carlos Hurtado's spouse) joined the project. The new broadcasting station was set to go quietly on-air by 1 December, 15 December or when 1998 starts, but they selected so the radiostation goes on-air by 8 December 1997 for cabalistic question: for John Lennon, Jim Morrison (The Doors) and for being the Announcer's Day.

Long meetings were held among Juan Carlos, Ninoska and Hugo to find the name of the new station. They had the surname "Rock & Pop", the name was missing though. The new radiostation could be called "Radioactiva" ("Radioactive"), "Planeta" ("Planet"), "Andrómeda" ("Andromed"), "Blue", "Onyx", "Oxígeno" ("Oxygen") or "La Clásica" ("The Classic") but none of these names convinced them; till one day the deceased politician and radial administrator Dr. Dagoberto Láinez told Juan Carlos Hurtado that if he had a radiostation which played Spanish Music on (Radio A) and the new one would play on the opposite, so he put "Z" which was the opposite to "A"; and it was that "Z Rock & Pop" was born.

=== First years ===
Z Rock & Pop 95.5 FM officially went on-air on 8 December 1997 at 00:00 with the 1970s classic "Venus" by Dutch band Shocking Blue as the first song. In its first years the station bet for the latest in music mixing with the classics of Rock & Pop such in English as in Spanish with genres like rock, pop, R&B, oldies, adult contemporary, AOR, new wave, ballads and reggae. The first DJ's staff was formed with Juan Carlos Hurtado, Ninoska Cuba, Coco Valderrama, Arturo Otoya, Juan Vargas and Luigi Santana. Likewise, the station added to its hourly programming the news micros directed by María Elena Castro (Mariaelena Cruz), and developed by 16 reporters. Timely and truthful information increased the audience at that time. With the voice of Randy Calandra.

The radio station became competitor of Stereo 100, which played on the classic format; and of Studio 92 and Radio América 94.3 FM for the latest and the best in music. Then by May 2004, the radio station also had a direct competence which was Oxígeno 102.1 FM, a brand-new station of then which played the same format on.

From 1998, the radio station decided to innovate with the entry of more DJ's who will form the group, such in sound support, production and contents. In addition, by broadcasting the weekly countdowns where the one-hit wonders were played on, so "The Hot Z" is named for the song which was the number one of the mentioned ranking. Also, the annual countdowns were held and broadcast every 8 December, date of the anniversary of the radiostation, where they selected the "Hot Z" of the year. The ranking lasted until 2005 so the radio station started broadcasting more classic music, specially from the 80's.

In 2002, the website of the radiostation www.radioz.fm is premiered, where the audience could get some information about the latest music and artists, play games online, laugh with some humorous sketches and specially, vote for songs for any ranking that were set to be played on the radio.

=== Change to 1980s music ===
After the broadcasting of the special ranking "Los Últimos 20" ("The Last 20") held on 13–15 May 2005, Z Rock & Pop shut down the weekly countdowns which played current music to broadcast music from the 1960s, 1970s, 1980s, 1990s and alternating with some themes of the moment. Therefore, Z Rock & Pop changes its slogan to "Lo mejor de los 80… y más" ("The best of the 80… and more") as a base to broadcasting of 1980s songs. The change caused indignation to many listeners who wanted to hear more actual themes the radiostation used to play on. The last broadcasting of the annual ranking "The Hot Z" was held when the radiostation turned 8 years on-air where Keane's "Everybody's Changing" was the song of that year.

In July 2006, the website of the station changed its structure. The sections like "Chica Zeta" ("Girl Z"), "Hogar" ("Home"), "Tecnología" ("Technology"), among others that were since the website was created so they could be replaced for the new sections like "Wallpapers Z", "Musicómetro" ("Musicometre"), etc. At the end of August of that year, the DJ's Juan Carlos Hurtado, Ninoska and Coco Valderrama left Z Rock & Pop to appear on other broadcasting stations.

=== The last years ===
Although it only focused on 1980s music, Z Rock & Pop also played some songs of the moment between 2005 and 2009 such as the following:

- 2005

(England) The Rolling Stones - Streets of Love
(England) Keane - This Is the Last Time
(England) Keane - Bend and Break
(England) Robbie Williams - Tripping
(United States) Bon Jovi - Have a Nice Day
(England) James Blunt - You're Beautiful
(Mexico) Santana feat. (United States) Michelle Branch & (United States) The Wreckers - I'm Feeling You
(United States) Green Day - Wake Me Up When September Ends

- 2006

(Canada) Daniel Powter - Bad Day
(United States) Dixie Chicks - Not Ready to Make Nice
(England) Yusuf - Heaven/Where True Love Goes
(Sweden) Roxette - One Wish
(France) Bob Sinclar feat. (England) Steve Edwards - World, Hold On (Children of the Sky)
(United States) Scissor Sisters feat. (England) Elton John - I Don't Feel Like Dancin'

- 2007

(United States) Maroon 5 - Makes Me Wonder
(United States) Bon Jovi - Lost Highway
(United States) Bruce Springsteen - Radio Nowhere
(England) Muse - Starlight
(England) Mika - Relax, Take It Easy

- 2008

(Spain) Miguel Ríos - Memorias de la Carretera
(England) Coldplay - Viva la Vida
(Argentina) Rata Blanca - Mujer Amante (Live)
(United States) The Killers - Read My Mind
(United States) The Killers - Human

- 2009

(Peru) Julio Andrade - Bajo el Sol de California
(Peru) Nosequien y Los Nosecuantos - La Tierra del Sol
(Peru) Libido - Nadie Sabe Lo Que Vendrá
(Peru) Libido - Malvada
(United States) Michael Jackson - This Is It
(United States) Lady Gaga - Poker Face
(Peru) Pedro Suárez-Vértiz feat. (Peru) Juan Diego Flórez - Nadia
(Peru) Pedro Suárez-Vértiz - Amazonas
(Argentina) Gustavo Cerati - Déjà Vu
(England) Muse - Uprising

In November 2007, some DJ's of the recently disappeared Radio A became part of Z Rock & Pop such as Karla Fernández, Marco Antonio Vásquez and the return of the DJ's Hibar Saldaña (who went back to the radiostation after 7 months) and Michael Phun, who was back on Z Rock & Pop after 5 years. Hence, during the period November 2007-August 2008, Z Rock & Pop had a DJ's staff in which all were part of its sister station Radio A except Leo Pro, this is because the current DJ Felipe Alfredo had been part of that broadcasting station during 1997–2003. By that month, the DJ's Rocky Rodríguez, Elizabeth Rodríguez and Tito Bernaza left Z Rock & Pop to become part of a brand-new sister station Radiomix (radiostation that substituted Radio A).

In the middle of 2008 the weekly countdowns were back but for this time as "La Esencia de la Semana" ("The Essence of the Week") where it broadcast the most ordered songs from the 60's, 70's, 80's, 90's, as well as some new songs. This weekly countdown lasted until the end of February 2009.

In February 2009, the radiostation was sold to a Monsefú radio entrepreneur Higinio Capuñay Sarpán. As a result of that, on 1 March some Z Rock & Pop's subsidiary stations were replaced by a Cumbia radiostation "La Karibeña", causing depression to the "fanatics" who loved the good music because Z was the only station which difussionated Rock & Pop music. The website of Z Rock & Pop was changed from www.radioz.fm to www.radioz.pe so it matches with the other links of the other stations in the same company.

However, in July 2009 Z Rock & Pop started to play Spanish Ballads on, a fact that occasioned that the audience are indignators by wondering why a Rock & Pop station could play that genre in which isn't its format. As a result of complaints about the wrong genre the station played on, Z Rock & Pop was back to its original format at the beginning of August 2009. In that month, DJ Coco Valderrama was back to Z Rock & Pop's microphones till December 2009.

Nonetheless, whilst Z Rock & Pop sponsored a concert that was set by 19 January 2010 which was of Thrash Metal band Metallica, an upcoming Capuñay's brand-new radiostation was announced to go on-air by the end of December 2009 on 95.5 MHz. This occasionates that many listeners wonder what could happen with the concert if the sponsored station disappeared. But in the middle of December 2009, every DJ was gradually taking leave of their listeners because the broadcasting station was going to change its format. In consequence, in the night of 30 December 2009, the radiostation presenter Mariley Paredes presented the last song for the station which was "Por Qué No Se Van" ("Why Don't They Go") by Los Prisioneros ("The Prisoners"). Afterwards, exactly at 20:00, the brand-new station of Reggaeton-Salsa-Cumbia format called "La Kalle" went on-air. The off-the-air of Z Rock & Pop caused much anger and depression to many listeners or "fanatics" who loved good music and who wanted to enjoy the Rock & Pop music of all time.

=== The return ===
Due to many complaints by the radiostation audience, on 26 January 2010 Z Rock & Pop was released as "Zeta Online" via www.radioz.pe. In the other hand, Z Rock & Pop was back on-air in some cities of Peru like Arequipa, Chiclayo, Cusco, Ilo, etc.

By the period 2010–2012, Z Rock & Pop was gradually expanding its signal throughout the country. Such signal was listened in Chachapoyas, Huancayo, La Oroya, Tarapoto, Pucallpa, Iquitos, Ica, Tacna, Camaná, inter alia. On 23 May 2012 the signal of Z Rock & Pop returned to Lima through 96.1 MHz at the audience's request who needed to listen to good music.

However, the relaunch didn't thrive because on the frequency 96.1 MHz in Lima was in dispute: Z Rock & Pop could be attained to be heard but another youth format station that was owned by a concert organiser company interfered Z Rock & Pop's signal, making both to sound at the same time on the same frequency. Because of that, Radio Miraflores S.A. entered into a judgement against Corporación Universal and Kandavu Producciones (Kandavu Productions) to get the frequency. In consequence, 6 September would be the last day that Z Rock & Pop broadcasting its signal in Lima, causing much depression to the audience again.

In 2013, the coverage was gradually reducing due to low ratings the station had. The majority of its frequencies were taken over by its sister stations like Exitosa (Successful), La Hot (radiostation which lasted till the beginning of 2014) and La Kalle (station that replaces La Hot at the beginning of 2014). In the other hand, the annual ranking "La Hot Z del Año" ("The Hot Z of the Year") was back after 8 years one day before Z Rock & Pop turned 16 years on-air. In the mentioned countdown, the song "Memoria" ("Memory") by French band Indochine was crowned as the song of that year.

=== Present time ===
Z Rock & Pop offers all the best Rock & Pop from the 60's, 70's, 80's, 90's as well as the current ones at all its styles. It broadcasts in some cities in Peru through its assigned frequencies, as on internet via www.radioz.pe for the rest of the country and in all over the world.

On 12 August 2015, Z Rock & Pop's signal returned to Lima via 98.7 MHz. That is because numerous listeners made the reiterated request of the return to the dial. The Signal could be heard clearly in the East zone of the city. In addition, Z Rock & Pop's signal returned to its frequency in Piura (89.5 MHz), as well as in Mollendo via 93.9 MHz. In a few days towards the end of August 2015, the signal returned to Iquitos via 107.1 MHz.

By this new stage of the radio station, it commenced to play Eurodance in its programming along with Rock, Pop, Oldies and rest of genres, including soft music in "Z Sunset" (Monday to Friday 18:00-19:00) and "La Balada de Tu Vida" ("The Ballad of Your Life") (Sundays 18:00-20:00). On October 2, 2015, Mariley Paredes returned to the microphones of Z Rock & Pop booth again to lead the radio program "Entre Zeteros" ("Amongst "Z" Lovers") by replacing the announcer Karim Juliet who was sacked off the broadcasting station.

In November 2015, the radio station stopped broadcasting in Cusco where it appeared on 88.3 MHz to be replaced by its sister station La Kalle. On the other hand, the radio station is announcing a ranking for its 18 years of broadcasting by the day of its anniversary (8 December). Furthermore, from Saturday 21 November 2015, the announcer Juan Carlos Hurtado is back to Z Rock & Pop replacing César André in the mornings. But it lasted almost one week until César André reappeared on "Café con Z" ("Coffee with Z"), causing the audience wonder what happened with Juan Carlos Hurtado.

In the middle of December 2015 its signal in Piura was shut down so Radio Inspiración (Radio Inspiration) returned to its frequency (89.5 MHz). However, there are some rumors that its owner (Higinio Capuñay) had bought the frequency of 105.5 so that Z Rock & Pop could broadcast on that frequency due to complaints of its listeners who lived in Lima: that the sound was heard too weak, that there were interferences with another radio station, etc.

At the end of January 2016, Gino Lozano and Julio Zeta announced their departure of the radio station, leaving Mariley Paredes as an only announcer of Z Rock & Pop. The program "Z Sunset" is now broadcasting from Monday to Thursday at the same schedule (18;00-19;00) from March 2016. In mid-April 2016, the frequency in Lima (98.7 MHz) stopped broadcasting its signal. Recently on 5 May 2016, all its frequencies were substituted by a Latin-American music station; so the radio station shut down its signal in the cities where it used to broadcast on (Arequipa, Chiclayo, Ica, Mollendo and Tacna) to continue broadcasting via internet. From that point, no presenters are heard on the radiostation any longer.

At the beginning of August 2016, DJ Felipe Alfredo announced his departure of Z Rock & Pop to commence his new stage of his life.

In the middle of August 2016, the radiostation was back to normal: the ballads are played on again 24 hours a day along with Rock, Pop, Oldies, and rest of genres, including a little bit of Eurodance. However, most of the radiostation's old id's are played on 24 hours a day such as Es Música (Is Music), Mas y mejor música de los 80 (More and better 80's music), a bit of La esencia de los 80 (The essence of the 80's) along with some of the latest ids of the radiostation such as Marca Original (Original Brand). Also, there are some rumours that the radiostation could broadcast back on the FM. On the last days of 2016, Randy Calandra, the ex-DJ of the radiostation who is now the Exitosa's voiceover, announced that on 31 December from 20:00 La Caja de Año Nuevo (The New Year's Box) will be broadcast with the best mixes by DJ Z. Besides, there are rumours that Randy Calandra would be the official voiceover of the radiostation, this is due to an advertisement which features his voice with some songs from the 80's, 90's and today's.

From May 2017, Hispa Rock & Pop and Domingo 80 y Z (Sundays 80 & Z, then changed to Domingo Clasico) are back to the station.

== Programs and sequences ==
The programs, sequences and identifications of the radio station have an origin, the production department directed by the suitable person (Ninoska Cuba)...the maximum creativity, the imagination never before was so well focused and directed to the right place they offered in their proposal, hence the names appeared:

=== Current programs and sequences ===
- Hispa Rock & Pop
  Half an hour of Rock & Pop in Spanish
  Monday to Friday 12:00-12:30
- La Hora del Break (Break Time)
  Monday to Friday 13:00-14:00
- Z Sunset
  Monday to Saturday 18:00-19:00
- La Caja (The Box) (with DJ Z, previously with DJ Tavo)
  The best remixes of three decades of music directed by DJ Z.
  Friday and Saturday 19:00-06:00
- Domingo Clásico (Classic Sunday)
  Sunday all-day
- Disco Z (program)
  Sunday 08:00-10:00 (remixes by DJ Z) and 18:00-20:00
- Duplex
  Two songs by an artist or group that were played on in any moment.
- Disco 70 y Z (Disco 70 & Z)
  Sequence where Disco music is played on in any moment, specially on Classic Sundays.
- Un Instante en Liverpool (One Instant in Liverpool)
  Sequence of The Beatles played on in any moment.

=== Past programs and sequences ===
- Billboard Año por Año (Billboard Year by Year) (with Juan Carlos Hurtado)
- Billboard Rock & Pop(with Juan Carlos Hurtado)
- Billboard 80's (with Juan Carlos Hurtado)
- Jet Z (with Juan Carlos Hurtado)
  Mon-Fri 10:00-12:30
- Pasajeros en Primera Clase (Passengers in First Class)
  Half an hour of the specials of an artist or group.
  Mon-Fri 12:30-13:00
- Etiqueta Negra (Black Label) (with Coco Valderrama)
- Ranking: Las 10 "Z" de la Semana (Ranking: The 10 "Z" of the Week)
  Saturday 10:00-11:00
- Z Express (Sequence)
- Sábados de Pura Música (Saturdays of Full Music)
- Expo Z
- Ionósfera (Ionosphere)
- Z Zoom
- La Fiesta de las 100 Horas (The Party of 100 Hours)
  Independence Day and New Year's Day program.
- Pijamas Party
- Hey Judy (with Judy Mejía)
- Z Noticias (Z News) (with Randy Calandra)
- Jack el Despertador (Jack the Alarm Clock) (with Randy Calandra)
- Rockosaurios (Rockosaurs) (with Randy Calandra)
- Tiranosaurio (Tiranosaurus)
- El Cuarto Oscuro (The Dark Room)
- El Agujero Negro (The Black Hole)
  The New Wave break of the radiostation.
- Clases de Español (Spanish Classes) (with Juan Vargas)
- Factor Z
- Azulado (Bluish)
- Generación Z (Generation Z)
- Top News del Fin de Semana (Top News of the Weekend)
- Z Pedidos (Z Orders)
- Morning Show (with Ninoska Cuba)
- Conexión Z (Conexion Z) (with Angee Gonzáles)
  A program that broadcast 90's music.
- 90 60 90 (with Mariley Paredes)
- Jazz en Z (Jazz on Z) (with Daniel Chapell)
  Sunday 21:00-22:00
- La 10 Calientes del Día (The Hot 10 of the Day) (with Coco Valderrama)
- Las Top News del Día (The Top News of the Day)
- Z Rock & Rock (with Carlos Chávez, then Mariley Paredes)
  One hour of Hard rock and Heavy Metal.
  Monday to Thursday 22:00-23:00
- La Balada de Tu Vida (The Ballad of Your Life)
  Sunday 18:00-19:00
- El Charly en Z (The Charly on Z) (with Carlos Chávez)
  Monday to Thursday 23:00-00:00
- Open Mind (with Carlos Chávez and Mario Arroyo in some editions)
  An early riser show of the radiostation.
  Monday to Thursday 23:00-06:00
- El Show de Mariley (Mariley's Night Show) (with Mariley Paredes)
- Hugo de Éstos Días (Hugo of These Days) (with Hugo Salazar)
- El Más Clásico (The Most Classic)
- Viernes 80 y Z (Friday 80 & Z)
- Clásicos Etiqueta Negra (Black Label Classics) (with Coco Valderrama)
- Hispa Rock
- Generación 80 (Generation 80) (with Felipe Alfredo)
- El Coleccionista... (The Collector…) (with Hugo Salazar)
- Liverpool
  One hour with The Beatles' hits.
  Sunday 22:00-23:00
- Noctámbulos (Night Owls) (with Sonia Freundt)
- Sábados con Felipe (Saturdays with Felipe) (with Felipe Alfredo)
- Sábados con Ninoska (Saturdays with Ninoska) (with Ninoska Cuba)
- Sábados con Mariley (Saturdays with Mariley) (with Mariley Paredes)
- El Ranking del Siglo (The Ranking of the Century)
- Música Z Rock & Pop (Music Z Rock & Pop)
- I Feel Good (with Gerardo Manuel)
  Monday to Friday 20:00-21:00
- Prime Time (with Coco Valderrama)
- Soft Z (with Felipe Alfredo, then Coco Valderrama)
- Especialmente Z (Specially Z)
- Lima Airplay (with Ninoska Cuba)
  The memories of Lima city in the 80's and 90's
  Saturday 10:00-11:00
- Café con Z (Coffee with Z) (with Ninoska Cuba)
  Monday to Friday 07:00-09:00
- Top Ten del Oyente (Top 10 of the Listener)
  The 10 songs most requested by the public, specially based on the 80's.
- Super Mario (with Mario Arroyo)
- Bailando con... (Dancing with… )
- Rock Clásico en Z (Classic Rock on Z)
- Una y Una (One and One)
- Zona Z (Z Zone)
- Z Express (Program)
- El Domingo 80 y Z (Sunday 80 & Z)
  Sunday all-day
- 5a las 5 (5 at 5)
- La Central (The Central)
- La Esencia de la Semana (The Essence of the Week)
  The top 20 of 70's, 80's, 90's and 00's songs most requested of the week.
- Cosecha 80 y Z (Reap 80 & Z)
  Sequence of 80's music.
- El Musiquarium (The Musiquarium) (with Randy Calandra)
  Monday to Friday 06:00-10:00
- En Blue Jeans (In Blue Jeans) (with Coco Valderrama)
  Monday to Friday 10:00-14:00 and Saturday 14:00-17:00
- Control Z (with Felipe Alfredo)
  Monday-Friday 14:00-17:00 and Saturday 10:00-14:00
- Pecado Original (Original Sin) (with Mariley Paredes)
  Monday to Saturday 17:00-20:00
- Nochentera (Whole Night + 80's) (with César André)
  Monday to Friday 21:00-00:00
- Z Vip and Vip
  Sunday all-day
- Classic
  Sequence where all the classic songs from 1960 to 1979 are played on.
- Disco Z
  Sequence of Disco music
- Made in Peru
  Sequence where Peruvian artists and groups are played on.
- Z Non-Stop (with DJ Z)
  The best mix of Rock & Pop music made and produced by DJ Z
  Friday and Saturday 21:00
- Z Extreme
  Sequence of Hard rock and Heavy Metal music.
- Xpress Music
  Program where people requested a song.
- Z Advance
  Sequence of the latest in music.
- Descarga 80 y Z (Download 80 & Z) (Sequence of Radiopolis)
  Monday to Friday 15:00-15:30
- La Previa de los Sábados (The antechamber of Saturdays) (with César André)
- Billboard: Un Día como Hoy (Billboard: One Day Like Today)
- Zábado con Z ("Zaturday" with "Z")
  Saturday all-day
- El Tocadiscos (The Turntable) (with Gino Lozano)
  Monday to Friday 19:00-23:00
- Radiopolis (with Julio Zeta)
  Monday to Saturday 14:00-18:00
- Entre Zeteros (Amongst "Z" lovers) (with Mariley Paredes)
  Monday to Friday 09:00-13:00
- Rezeteando (Re-Z-ing)
  Sunday to Friday 23:00-06:00
- La Hora del Sunset (Sunset Time)
  Monday to Saturday 18:00-19:00 (program that substituted Z Sunset in the first weeks of August 2016)

== Presenters ==
Z Rock & Pop has been characterised for being a broadcasting station with fresh voices. Always with professionalism. Right now, the relation of presenters, announcers or DJ's who have passed through the radiostation's booths:

=== 1997-1999 ===
- Juan Carlos Hurtado (1997–2006, 2015)
- Ninoska Cuba (1997–2006)
- Coco Valderrama (1997–2006, 2009, 2010–2012)
- Luigi Santana (1997–1999)
- Juan Vargas (1997–2003)
- Arturo Otoya (d. 2014) (1997–1998, 1999–2000)
- Daniel Chapell (1998–2006)
- Judy Mejía (1998–2000)
- Mauricio Martínez (1999)
- José Ángeles (1998–2000)
- Randy Calandra (1999, 2009)
- Michael Phun (1999–2001, 2007–2009)
- Víctor McDonald (1999–2002)
- Mario Arroyo (1999–2002, 2004, 2005–2007, 2009)
- Mariley Paredes (1999–2007, 2009, 2010–2013, 2015–2016)

=== 2000-2009 ===
- Jesús Cueva (2000–2001)
- Saulo Gonzáles (2002–2003)
- José Araujo (2002)
- Angee Gonzáles (2002–2004)
- Carlos Chávez (2003, 2003–2005)
- Kique Castro (2003–2004, 2005)
- Hugo Salazar (2003–2004)
- Gustavo Bisbal (DJ Tavo) (2004–2006)
- Felipe Alfredo Maguiña (2004–2009, 2010–2016)
- Alfredo Cañote (2004–2006)
- Sonia Freundt (2004)
- Gerardo Manuel (2005–2006)
- Elizabeth Rodríguez (2006–2007)
- Rocky Rodríguez (2006–2007)
- Hibar Saldaña (2006–2007, 2007–2009)
- Leo Pro (2007–2009)
- Tito Bernaza (2007)
- Denisse Mac Cubbin (2007)
- Karla Fernández (2007–2009)
- Marco Antonio Vásquez (2007–2008)
- José Arias (2008–2009)
- César André (2009, 2010–2015, 2015–2016)
- Carlos Vásquez (DJ Z) (2009–2016, 2016-current)

=== 2010-current ===
- Gino Lozano (2010–2011, 2015–2016)
- Kike Fernández (2014–2015)
- Karim Juliet Alegría (2015)
- Virguit Delawicht (2015)
- Julio Santos (Julio Zeta) (2015–2016)

== Frequencies ==
=== Current frequencies ===
2024–present

City	Call sign	Frequency	ERP	Period
Ventanilla	OAT-4F FM	91.5 MHz	1 kW	2024–present

=== Past frequencies ===
1997-2009

City	Call sign	Frequency	ERP	Period
Abancay	OAT-5E FM	101.5 MHz	250 W	1998-2009
Arequipa	OCZ-6S FM	99.1 MHz	3 kW	1997-2009, 2010–2016
Asia	OCO-4M FM	89.3 MHz	100 W	2007-2009
Ayacucho	OAT-5A FM	103.3 MHz	250 W	1997-2009
Cajamarca	OBW-2Z FM	91.1 MHz	1 kW	1997-2009
Cañete	OAR-4Y FM	97.7 MHz	1 kW	1998-2007, 2009
Cañete	OBR-4K FM	99.9 MHz	1 kW	2007-2009
Cerro de Pasco	OAO-4P FM	105.5 MHz	1 kW	2006-2009
Chachapoyas	OCW-9P FM	95.5 MHz	1 kW	2007-2009
Chiclayo	OBW-1L FM	98.9 MHz	1 kW	1997-2009
Chimbote	OCZ-3V FM	105.9 MHz	1 kW	1997-2009
Chincha	OAT-5O FM	91.5 MHz	1 kW	1998-2009
Chulucanas	OAT-1A FM	96.9 MHz	250 W	1998-2003
Cusco	OCZ-7M FM	99.3 MHz	500 W	1997-2009
Huacho	OAT-4U FM	96.1 MHz	1 kW	1998-2003, 2005–2009
Huancavelica	OBT-5M FM	91.5 MHz	250 W	1998-2009
Huancayo	OBR-4Q FM	92.3 MHz	1 kW	2007-2009
Huánuco	OCT-3I FM	99.3 MHz	250 W	2001-2009
Huaral	OBT-4Y FM	96.9 MHz	250 W	1997-2009
Huaraz	OCZ-3E FM	92.5 MHz	500 W	2007-2009
Ica	OAT-5W FM	99.9 MHz	1 kW	1997-2009
Ilo	OBT-6I FM	92.9 MHz	1 kW	1997-2009
Iquitos	OBW-8R FM	88.9 MHz	1 kW	1998-2009
Jaén	OCT-2S FM	93.3 MHz	1 kW	1997-2003
Juliaca	OAT-7H FM	89.5 MHz	250 W	1997-2009
Lima	OCW-4Z FM	95.5 MHz	20 kW	1997-2009
Moquegua	OBT-6L FM	99.3 MHz	1 kW	1998-2003
Moyobamba	OCW-9P FM	92.9 MHz	1 kW	2003
Pisco	OBT-5T FM	95.5 MHz	1 kW	1997-2009
Piura	OCT-1I FM	89.5 MHz	1 kW	1997-2009, 2015
Pucallpa	OBW-8H FM	107.1 MHz	1 kW	1997-2009
Puerto Maldonado	OBW-7R FM	93.3 MHz	250 W	1997-2009
Puno	OAT-7M FM	89.5 MHz	1 kW	1998-2003
Sullana	OAT-1H FM	90.1 MHz	1 kW	1997-2009
Tacna	OBW-6T FM	102.1 MHz	250 W	2009, 2011–2016
Talara	OCT-1O FM	101.9 MHz	1 kW	1998-2002
Talara	OCT-1O FM	103.9 MHz	250 W	2002-2009
Tarapoto	OCW-9V FM	100.1 MHz	1 kW	1997-2009
Tarma	OBO-4B FM	104.9 MHz	500 W	2006-2009
Trujillo	OCZ-2W FM	93.5 MHz	1 kW	1997-2009
Tumbes	OCT-1E FM	96.7 MHz	1 kW	1997-2009

2010-2011

City	Call sign	Frequency	ERP	Period
Chachapoyas	OCW-9P FM	95.5 MHz	1 kW	2010-2011
Chiclayo	OBW-1L FM	98.9 MHz	1 kW	2010-2013
Cusco	OCZ-7M FM	99.3 MHz	500 W	2010-2011
Huancayo	OBW-4L FM	95.1 MHz	1 kW	2010-2013
Iquitos	OBW-8S FM	107.1 MHz	1 kW	2010-2011

2011-2012

City	Call sign	Frequency	ERP	Period
Cusco	OCW-7F FM	88.3 MHz	500 W	2011-2015
Ica	OBT-5J FM	97.3 MHz	250 W	2011-2013
Ilo	OBW-6M FM	98.3 MHz	250 W	2011-2013
Iquitos	OBW-8R FM	88.9 MHz	1 kW	2011-2013
Tarapoto	OCW-9V FM	100.1 MHz	1 kW	2011-2013

2012-2013

City	Call sign	Frequency	ERP	Period
Camaná	OCQ-6V FM	100.7 MHz	500 W	2012-2013, 2014–2015
Chimbote	OCW-3A FM	98.9 MHz	1 kW	2012-2013
La Oroya	OAK-4Z FM; OAC-4B FM	95.1 MHz; 103.1 MHz	500 W	2012-2013
Lima	OCR-4N FM	96.1 MHz	6 kW	May 23, 2012 – September 6, 2012

2014-2016

City	Call sign	Frequency	ERP	Period
Chiclayo	OBW-1L FM	98.7 MHz	1 kW	2014
Chiclayo	OBW-1F FM	89.7 MHz	1 kW	2015-2016
Ica	OCW-5P FM	104.1 MHz	5 kW	2014-2016
La Oroya	OAK-4Y FM	92.9 MHz	250 W	2014-2015
Lima	OCW-4U FM	98.7 MHz	250 W	2015-2016
Mollendo	OBR-6K FM	93.9 MHz	250 W	August 2015, December 2015 – 2016

== Slogans ==
Period	Slogan
1997-2002, 2016-current	La Marca de la Buena Música (The brand of good music): 1997-2002, 2009 La primera cadena Rock & Pop del Perú (The first Rock & Pop network in Peru); 1997-current Sólo Rock & Pop (Only Rock & Pop); 1997-current Mucha Música (Much Music); 1997-2000, 2016-current; 1997-2000, 2016-current Lo mejor de ayer, hoy (The best of yesterday, today); 1997-2000 La banda sonora de tu vida (The soundtrack of your life); 1997-2005 Gente que ama la música (People who love music); 1997-2000 Antes que todas (Before all of them); 1997-2000 El pasado, presente y futuro de la música (The past, present and future of music); 1997-2000 Porque los tiempos cambian, pero la música queda (Because the times change, but the music remains); 1999-2000 Rumbo al 2001 (Heading to 2001); 1999 2 años de radio, con la música de toda tu vida (2 years of radio, with music of your lifetime) (anniversary)
2002-2005	Desde 1997, la radio Rock & Pop del Perú (Since 1997, the Rock & Pop radiostation of Peru)
2002-2005, 2016-current	Es Música (Is Music): 2003-2005, 2016-current Donde el placer se convierte en música (Where pleasure becomes music); 2004 Amamos la música (We love music); 2004 Amamos la música, tenemos la mejor (We love music, we've got the best); 2004 Sólo hay una (There's just one); 2004 7 años de buena música (7 years of good music) (anniversary)
2005-2006	Lo mejor de los 80… y más (The best of the 80's… and more): 2005 8 años con lo mejor de los 80… y más (8 years with the best of the 80's… and more) (anniversary); 2005 8 años... ¿Quién lo diría? (8 years... Who would say it?) (anniversary)
2006-2007	La mejor música de los 80… y más (The better 80's music… and more): 2006, 2016-current Más y mejor música de los 80 (More and better 80's music)
2007-2009, 2016-current	La esencia de los 80 (The essence of the 80's): 2008 11 años, la esencia de los 80 (11 years, the essence of the 80's) (anniversary)
2009	¡Vive! (Live It!): 2009 ¡Vive! La esencia de los 80 (Live It! The essence of the 80's); 2009 Con las mejores bandas, ¡Vive! (With the best bands, Live It!); 2009 Tu radio (Your radio); 2009 12 años (12 years) (anniversary)
2010-2012	Todo el Rock & Pop, todas las décadas… (All the Rock & Pop, all decades…)
2012-2016	¡Marca Original! (Original Brand!): 2012 Desde 1997, La marca original del Rock & Pop (Since 1997, The Rock & Pop original brand); 2013 16 años, marca original (16 years, original brand) (anniversary); 2014 17 años, marca original (17 years, original brand) (anniversary); 2015 18 años, marca original (18 years, original brand) (anniversary)
2016-2017	Lo mejor de los 70's, 80's, 90's y hoy (The best of the 70's, 80's, 90's & now) (Only on Facebook page): 2016-2017 Lo mejor del Rock & Pop (Only on Facebook page)

== Ranking ==
Z Rock & Pop has broadcast different annual rankings during 1998–2005 as well as in the 2013–2014. These are the annual rankings the radiostation provided every 8 December:

- 1998

10° (United States) Aerosmith - I Don't Want to Miss a Thing
9° (Argentina) Fito Páez - El Amor Después del Amor
8° (England) Jimmy Ray - Are You Jimmy Ray?
7° (United Kingdom) Lighthouse Family - High
6° (England) Supertramp - Sooner or Later
5° (Canada) Céline Dion - My Heart Will Go On
4° (Australia) Savage Garden - Truly Madly Deeply
3° (Canada) Shania Twain - You're Still the One
2° (Germany) Fool's Garden - Lemon Tree
Hot Z: (Australia) Natalie Imbruglia - Torn/ (United States) Fastball - The Way

- 1999

20°
19°
18°
17°
16°
15° (Canada) Shania Twain - Man! I Feel Like a Woman!
14°
13°
12°
11°
10° (Mexico) Santana feat. (Mexico) Maná - Corazón Espinado
9° (Canada) Shania Twain - That Don't Impress Me Much
8° (United States) Backstreet Boys - I Want It That Way
7° (Australia) Savage Garden - I Knew I Loved You
6° (Germany) Lou Bega - Mambo No. 5
5° (United States) Blondie - Maria
4° (United States) Shawn Mullins - Lullaby
3° (Mexico) Santana feat. (United States) Rob Thomas - Smooth
2° (United States) New Radicals - You Get What You Give
Hot Z: (United States) Cher - Believe

- 2000

40° (Wales) Tom Jones feat. (Sweden) The Cardigans - Burning Down the House
39° (Norway) a-ha - Summer Moved On
38° (Spain) Mikel Erentxun - California
37° (Republic of Ireland) The Corrs - Breathless
36° (England) Chumbawamba - She's Got All the Friends That Money Can Buy
35° (Mexico) Caifanes - Afuera
34° (Mexico) Santana - Primavera
33° (England) Richard Ashcroft - A Song for the Lovers/ (Italy) Eiffel 65 - Move Your Body
32° (Spain) Tam Tam Go! - Atrapados en la Red
31° (Republic of Ireland) Westlife - Fool Again
30° (United States) Britney Spears - (You Drive Me) Crazy
29° (Canada) Alanis Morissette - That I Would Be Good
28° (Australia) Savage Garden - Crash and Burn/ (Italy) Eiffel 65 - Blue (Da Ba Dee)
27° (Colombia) Shakira - Dónde Están los Ladrones?/ (United States) Anastacia - I'm Outta Love
26° (Canada) Shania Twain - Don't Be Stupid (You Know I Love You)
25° (United States) The Wallflowers - Sleepwalker
24° (United States) Backstreet Boys - Show Me the Meaning of Being Lonely
23° (Scotland) Travis - Why Does It Always Rain on Me?
22° (New Zealand) Bic Runga - Sway
21° (Spain) Ana Torroja - Ya No Te Quiero
20° (United States) Red Hot Chili Peppers - Otherside
19° (England) Five - Keep on Movin'
18° (Wales) Tom Jones feat. (Germany) Mousse T. - Sex Bomb
17° (United States) Vertical Horizon - Everything You Want/ (Belgium) Lara Fabian - I Will Love Again
16° (United States) Lonestar - Amazed
15° (Argentina) La Mosca Tsé - Tsé - Para No Verte Más/ (Italy) Eiffel 65 - Too Much of Heaven
14° (United States) Filter - Take a Picture
13° (Peru) Pedro Suárez-Vértiz - Rapta la Mona
12° (United States) Madonna - American Pie
11° (Chile) La Ley - Fuera de Mí
10° (England) Sting feat. (Algeria) Cheb Mami - Desert Rose
9° (Peru) Pedro Suárez-Vértiz - Alguien Que Bese Como Tú
8° (Scotland) Mark Knopfler - What It Is
7° (Peru) Libido - En Esta Habitación
6° (United States) Macy Gray - I Try
5° (Argentina) Viejas Locas - Me Gustas Mucho
4° (Republic of Ireland) U2 - Beautiful Day
3° (United States) Red Hot Chili Peppers - Californication
2° (United States) Madonna - Music
Hot Z: (Chile) La Ley - Aquí

- 2001

40° (Sweden) Roxette - Real Sugar
39° (United States) Sugar Ray - When It's Over
38° (Republic of Ireland) The Corrs feat. (Spain) Alejandro Sanz - Una Noche
37° (Republic of Ireland) Westlife - My Love
36° (United States) Madonna - Amazing
35° (England) Robbie Williams - Better Man
34° (Colombia) Juanes - Fíjate Bien
33° (Italy) Laura Pausini - Quiero Decirte que te Amo
32° (United States) Backstreet Boys - More Than That
31° (United States) R.E.M. - Imitation of Life
30° (United States) Train - Drops of Jupiter
29° (Spain) Ana Torroja feat. Miguel Bosé - Duende
28° (United States) Aerosmith - Jaded
27° (Republic of Ireland) U2 - Walk On
26° (Scotland) Travis - Side
25° (England) Dido - Hunter
24° (Chile) La Ley - Eternidad
23° (England) Robbie Williams - Supreme
22° (United States) Janet Jackson - Someone to Call My Lover
21° (United States) Aerosmith - Fly Away from Here
20° (Canada) Nelly Furtado - Turn Off the Light
19° (France) Modjo - Lady (Hear Me Tonight)
18° (United States) NSYNC - This I Promise You
17° (Republic of Ireland) U2 - Stuck in a Moment You Can't Get Out Of
16° (United States) Bon Jovi - Thank You for Loving Me
15° (Spain) La Oreja de Van Gogh - La Playa
14° (England) Dido - Don't Think of Me
13° (United States) Michael Jackson - You Rock My World
12° (England) Robbie Williams - Rock DJ
11° (United States) Backstreet Boys - Shape of My Heart
10° (United States) Madonna - What It Feels Like for a Girl
9° (Sweden) Roxette - The Centre of the Heart
8° (England) Dido - Here with Me
7° (United States) Madonna - Don't Tell Me
6° (Chile) La Ley - Mentira
5° (Scotland) Travis - Sing
4° (United States) Lenny Kravitz - Again
3° (Canada) Nelly Furtado - I'm Like a Bird
2° (Republic of Ireland) U2 - Elevation
Hot Z: (England) Dido - Thank You

- 2002

40° (United States) Sheryl Crow - Soak Up the Sun
39° (Spain) Miguel Ríos feat. Manolo García - Insurrección
38° (Republic of Ireland) The Corrs - Would You Be Happier?
37° (Sweden) Roxette - A Thing About You
36° (England) Robbie Williams feat. (United States) Nicole Kidman - Somethin' Stupid
35° (Argentina) Charly García - Tu Vicio
34° (England) Eric Clapton - Believe in Life
33° (England) Dido - Hunter
32° (Canada) Shania Twain - I'm Gonna Getcha Good!
31° (Spain) El Canto del Loco - Son Sueños
30° (Canada) Alanis Morissette - Precious Illusions
29° (Chile) La Ley - Intenta Amar
28° (United States) Five for Fighting - Superman (It's Not Easy)
27° (Spain) Enrique Bunbury - Lady Blue
26° (England) Elton John - I Want Love
25° (Canada) Bryan Adams - Here I Am
24° (Chile) La Ley feat. (Mexico) Ely Guerra - El Duelo (Unplugged)
23° (Spain) Miguel Ríos feat. (Mexico) Álex Lora - Triste Canción
22° (United States) Wheatus - A Little Respect
21° (Australia) Kylie Minogue - Love at First Sight
20° (Spain) Hombres G - Lo Noto
19° (Chile) Los Prisioneros - Por Qué No Se Van (Live)
18° (United States) P!nk - Get the Party Started
17° (Mexico) Maná - Eres Mi Religión
16° (Canada) Nelly Furtado - ...on the Radio (Remember the Days)
15° (Canada) Alanis Morissette - Hands Clean
14° (Colombia) Juanes feat. (Canada) Nelly Furtado - Fotografía/ (Colombia) Juanes - Es Por Ti
13° (England) Coldplay - In My Place
12° (England) The Rolling Stones - Don't Stop
11° (United States) Vanessa Carlton - A Thousand Miles
10° (England) Sophie Ellis-Bextor - Murder on the Dancefloor
9° (Scotland) Travis - Side
8° (England) Coldplay - Trouble
7° (Mexico) Maná - Ángel de Amor
6° (Mexico) Elefante - De La Noche a la Mañana
5° (Canada) Avril Lavigne - Complicated
4° (Colombia) Juanes - A Dios le Pido
3° (Australia) Natalie Imbruglia - Wrong Impression
2° (Australia) Kylie Minogue - Can't Get You Out of My Head
Hot Z: (Mexico) Santana feat. (United States) Michelle Branch - The Game of Love

- 2003

40° (Italy) Zucchero feat. (Mexico) Maná - Baila Morena
39° (Chile) Gondwana - Felicidad
38° (Peru) Pedro Suárez-Vértiz - Bailar
37° (United States) Madonna - American Life/ (United States) Madonna - Die Another Day
36° (Canada) Shania Twain - I'm Gonna Getcha Good!
35° (Sweden) The Cardigans - For What It's Worth
34° (Colombia) Juanes - Mala Gente
33° (Wales) Stereophonics - Maybe Tomorrow
32° (Jamaica) Ziggy Marley - True to Myself
31° (Argentina) Kevin Johansen - El Círculo
30° (United States) Audioslave - Like a Stone
29° (Peru) Libido - Frágil
28° (United States) Sixpence None the Richer - Don't Dream It's Over
27° (Chile) La Ley - Ámate y Sálvate
26° (Spain) Jarabe de Palo - Bonito
25° (Australia) INXS - Tight
24° (Russia) t.A.T.u. - Not Gonna Get Us
23° (Peru) Zen - Sol
22° (United States) Evanescence feat. (United States) Paul McCoy - Bring Me to Life
21° (Canada) Avril Lavigne - Knockin' on Heaven's Door
20° (United States) Nelly feat. (United States) Kelly Rowland - Dilemma
19° (United States) The Black Eyed Peas - Where Is the Love?
18° (Argentina) Babasónicos - Los Calientes
17° (England) Sophie Ellis-Bextor - Mixed Up World
16° (Chile) La Ley - Más Allá
15° (Mexico) Santana feat. (United States) Michelle Branch - The Game of Love
14° (Argentina) Gustavo Cerati - Karaoke
13° (England) Coldplay - God Put a Smile upon Your Face
12° (United States) Michelle Branch - Are You Happy Now?
11° (England) Robbie Williams - Feel
10° (England) Coldplay - The Scientist
9° (Canada) Avril Lavigne - I'm with You
8° (Argentina) Gustavo Cerati - Cosas Imposibles
7° (United States) Dishwalla - Angels or Devils
6° (England) Dido - White Flag
5° (Russia) t.A.T.u. - All the Things She Said
4° (United States) Michelle Branch - All You Wanted
3° (England) Simply Red - Sunrise
2° (England) The Rolling Stones - Don't Stop
Hot Z: (England) Coldplay - Clocks

- 2004

40° (United States) Lenny Kravitz - California
39° (Peru) Verttigo - Virus de Amor
38° (United States) Eamon - F**k It (I Don't Want You Back)
37° (England) George Michael - Amazing
36° (Peru) Nosequien y Los Nosecuantos - Yo de Ti
35° (England) Robbie Williams - Radio
34° (United States) Lenny Kravitz - Where Are We Runnin'?
33° (Mexico) Julieta Venegas - Lento/ (Mexico) Julieta Venegas - Andar Conmigo
32° (Mexico) Maná - Te Llevaré al Cielo
31° (United States) The Black Eyed Peas - Where Is the Love?
30° (Argentina) Babasónicos - Y Qué?
29° (Argentina) Coti feat. (Argentina) Andrés Calamaro - Nada Fue un Error
28° (Australia) The Vines - Winning Days
27° (Canada) Avril Lavigne - My Happy Ending
26° (Peru) Cementerio Club - Inmortales
25° (Canada) Alanis Morissette - Everything
24° (Australia) Kylie Minogue - Slow
23° (England) Joss Stone - Fell in Love with a Boy
22° (United States) No Doubt - It's My Life
21° (England) Keane - Everybody's Changing
20° (United States) Evanescence - My Immortal
19° (Peru) TK - Ilusión
18° (England) Duran Duran - (Reach Up for The) Sunrise
17° (Canada) Nelly Furtado - Try/ (Canada) Nelly Furtado - Powerless (Say What You Want)
16° (Argentina) Babasónicos - Irresponsables
15° (Hawaii) Israel Kamakawiwoʻole - Somewhere over the Rainbow
14° (Germany) Reamonn - Supergirl
13° (Canada) Avril Lavigne - Don't Tell Me
12° (United States) 3 Doors Down - Here Without You
11° (United States) Scissor Sisters - Take Your Mama
10° (United States) Limp Bizkit - Behind Blue Eyes
9° (Argentina) Babasónicos - Putita
8° (Finland) The Rasmus - In the Shadows
7° (United States) OutKast - Hey Ya!
6° (United States) Maroon 5 - She Will Be Loved
5° (Republic of Ireland) U2 - Vertigo
4° (Mexico) Café Tacvba - Eres
3° (United States) Hoobastank - The Reason
2° (United States) Maroon 5 - This Love
Hot Z: (England) Keane - Somewhere Only We Know

- 2005

15° (England) Robbie Williams - Tripping
14° (England) Keane - Bend and Break
13° (United States) Bon Jovi - Have a Nice Day
12° (England) The Rolling Stones - Streets of Love
11° (England) Keane - This Is the Last Time
10° (Mexico) Santana feat. (United States) Michelle Branch & (United States) The Wreckers - I'm Feeling You
9° (United States) Audioslave - Be Yourself
8° (Peru) Frágil - No Soy De Fierro
7° (United States) Scissor Sisters - Take Your Mama
6° (Australia) Natalie Imbruglia - Shiver
5° (United States) Maroon 5 - Sunday Morning
4° (United States) Green Day - Boulevard of Broken Dreams
3° (England) Coldplay - Speed of Sound
2° (England) James Blunt - You're Beautiful
Hot Z: (England) Keane - Everybody's Changing

- 2013 (*)

10° (United States) P!nk feat. (United States) Nate Ruess - Just Give Me a Reason/ (United States) The Black Keys - Lonely Boy
9° (England) Keane - Higher Than the Sun
8° (England) The Rolling Stones - Doom and Gloom
7° (England) Muse - Panic Station
6° (United States) Fun feat. (United States) Janelle Monáe - We Are Young
5° (United States) Bruno Mars - Locked Out of Heaven
4° (Canada) Nickelback - Lullaby
3° (United States) Bon Jovi - Because We Can
2° (United States) Foster the People - Houdini
1° (England) Keane - Disconnected
Hot Z: (France) Indochine - Memoria

- 2014

20° (United States) Neon Trees - Everybody Talks/ (Sweden) Lykke Li - Get Some
19° (United States) OneRepublic - Counting Stars
18° (United States) Foster the People - Best Friend
17° (France) Daft Punk feat. (United States) Pharrell Williams - Lose Yourself to Dance
16° (Republic of Ireland) U2 - The Miracle (Of Joey Ramone)
15° (United States) Fall Out Boy - Young Volcanoes
14° (United States) Bruno Mars - Treasure
13° (United States) Capital Cities - One Minute More
12° (United States) The Killers - Just Another Girl
11° (United States) Kings of Leon - Supersoaker
10° (United States) American Authors - Best Day of My Life
9° (United States) The Black Keys - Fever
8° (England) Placebo - Loud Like Love
7° (England) Coldplay - Magic
6° (England) Two Wounded Birds - If Only We Remain
5° (France) Daft Punk feat. (United States) Julian Casablancas - Instant Crush
4° (Republic of Ireland) U2 - Ordinary Love
3° (England) Coldplay - A Sky Full of Stars
2° (United States) Capital Cities - Safe and Sound
1° (United States) Pharrell Williams - Happy
Hot Z: (France) Daft Punk feat. (United States) Pharrell Williams & (United States) Nile Rodgers - Get Lucky

- 2015 (**)

18° (United States) Goo Goo Dolls - Iris (1998) / (England) Robbie Williams - Angels (1998)
17° (United States) Dishwalla - Angels Or Devils (2003)
16° (England) Gorillaz - Clint Eastwood (2001)
15° (France) Indochine - Memoria (2013)/ (Scotland) Travis - Sing (2001)
14° (United States) Bon Jovi - It's My Life (2000)
13° (Australia) Natalie Imbruglia - Torn (1998)
12° (United States) Red Hot Chili Peppers - Otherside (2000)
11° (United States) The Wallflowers - One Headlight (1997)
10° (Argentina) Gustavo Cerati - Cosas Imposibles (2003)
9° (England) Coldplay - Yellow (2001)
8° (United States) Hoobastank - The Reason (2004)
7° (England) The Verve - Bitter Sweet Symphony (1997)
6° (United States) Audioslave - Like a Stone (2003)
5° (England) Coldplay - Clocks (2003)
4° (United States) Red Hot Chili Peppers - Californication (2000)
3° (England) Coldplay - The Scientist (2003)
2° (England) Keane - Everybody's Changing (2005)
Hot Z: (England) Keane - Somewhere Only We Know (2004)

(*) Ranking broadcast on 7 December.

(**) Ranking based on the 18th anniversary of the radiostation.

== See also ==
- List of radio stations in Peru
- Media of Peru
