= Corre, corre =

Corre, Corre

Studio album by Leño
- Released: 1982
- Recorded: February 1982, Kingsway records, United Kingdom
- Genre: Hard Rock; Blues rock
- Length: 30:28
- Language: Spanish
- Label: Chapa Discos
- Producer: Carlos Narea

Leño chronology
Más madera (1981)	Corre, Corre (1982)	Vivo '83 (2006)

Corre corre is the third and final studio album by Spanish Hard rock band Leño. It was produced by Carlos Narea and published by Chapa Discos in 1982.

It was recorded at Ian Gillan's recording studio located in London, with the production of Carlos Narea. There are notable songs included such as Sorprendente or ¡Qué desilusión!. The intention was to achieve prestige both inside and outside Spain but when the critics of Kerrang! evaluated the album, the result was awful. Some of them claimed that was impossible to rate the album because of the language.

The album was ranked number 19 on Rolling Stone's "50 Greatest Spanish rock albums". The Spanish magazine Efe Eme ranked Corre, corre as the 129th best Spanish rock album ever.

== Track listing ==
Side one
No.	Title	Writer(s)	Length
1.	"¡Corre, Corre!"	Rosendo Mercado / Tony Urbano / Ramiro Penas	3:23
2.	"Sorprendente"	Rosendo Mercado / Tony Urbano / Ramiro Penas	4:05
3.	"No Se Vende El Rock & Roll"	Rosendo Mercado / Tony Urbano / Ramiro Penas	3:09
4.	"La Fina"	Rosendo Mercado / Tony Urbano / Ramiro Penas	4:49

Side two
No.	Title	Writer(s)	Length
5.	"¡Que Tire La Toalla!"	Rosendo Mercado / Tony Urbano / Ramiro Penas	4:10
6.	"Entre Las Cejas"	Rosendo Mercado / Tony Urbano / Ramiro Penas	3:30
7.	"No lo entiendo"	Rosendo Mercado / Tony Urbano / Ramiro Penas	3:26
8.	"¡Qué Desilusión!"	Rosendo Mercado / Tony Urbano / Ramiro Penas	3:42

== Personnel ==
Leño

- Rosendo Mercado: Guitar and vocals
- Ramiro Penas: Drums and backing vocals
- Tony Urbano: Bass guitar and backing vocals

== Chart performance ==
Chart (2006)	Peak position
Spanish Album Charts	90
