= Cuentos de ayer y de hoy =

Studio album by Ñu
- Released: October 1978
- Genre: Progressive rock; hard rock; progressive folk
- Label: Chapa/Zafiro
- Producer: Vicente "Mariskal" Romero

Ñu chronology
| Cuentos de ayer y de hoy (1978) | A golpe de látigo (1979) |

Cuentos de ayer y de hoy ("Tales from Yesterday and Today") is the debut album by the Spanish hard and folk rock band Ñu released in October 1978.

This album features a progressive rock style combining hard and folk rock. The flute predominance in the album's sound has been compared with Jethro Tull's style, but playing a way heavier sound it is in fact a predecessor of folk metal. Regarded as one of the best Spanish progressive rock albums, it has been issued in Spain, Japan and South Korea. The Spanish magazine Efe Eme ranked Cuentos de ayer y de hoy as the 148th best Spanish rock album ever.

== Track listing ==
Side one
| No. | Title | Writer(s) | Length |
|---|---|---|---|
| 1. | "Profecía" | José Carlos Molina | 3:50 |
| 2. | "Preparan" | J.C. Molina / Jorge Calvo / Enrique Ballesteros | 6:47 |
| 3. | "Algunos músicos fueron nosotros" | José Carlos Molina | 3:28 |
| 4. | "Cuentos de ayer y de hoy" | José Carlos Molina | 5:26 |

Side two
| No. | Title | Writer(s) | Length |
|---|---|---|---|
| 5. | "El juglar" | José Carlos Molina | 8:05 |
| 6. | "Paraíso de flautas" | José Carlos Molina | 9:32 |

== Personnel ==
- José Carlos Molina – Vocals, flute, keyboards, harmonica, percussion, concertina
- Enrique Ballesteros – Drums, percussion
- José Mª García – Guitar, mellotron
- Jorge Calvo – Bass
- Jean François André – violin, baton
- Mariscal Romero – producer
