= Leño (album) =

Studio album by Leño
- Released: 1979
- Recorded: December 1978, Kirios Studios, Madrid
- Genre: Hard rock, progressive rock
- Length: 39:54
- Language: Spanish
- Label: Chapa
- Producer: Teddy Bautista

Leño chronology
Leño (1979)	Más madera (1980)

Leño is the debut studio album by Spanish hard rock band Leño. It was produced by Teddy Bautista and released by Chapa Discos in 1979.

During the recording, bassist Chiqui Mariscal left the band and was replaced by Tony Urbano as shown on the cover of the album.

It was ranked as the 106th best rock en español album ever according to American magazine Al Borde. The Spanish magazine Efe Eme ranked Leño as the 72nd best Spanish rock album ever.

== Track listing ==
Side one
No.	Title	Writer(s)	Length
1.	"Castigo"	Rosendo Mercado / Chiqui Mariscal / Ramiro Penas	10:26
2.	"El oportunista"	Rosendo Mercado / Chiqui Mariscal / Ramiro Penas	4:26
3.	"El tren"	Rosendo Mercado / José Carlos Molina	4:24

Side two
No.	Title	Writer(s)	Length
4.	"Este Madrid"	Rosendo Mercado / Chiqui Mariscal / Ramiro Penas	5:48
5.	"La nana"	Rosendo Mercado / Chiqui Mariscal / Ramiro Penas	8:03
6.	"Sodoma y chabola"	Rosendo Mercado / Chiqui Mariscal / Ramiro Penas / Mª Fernanda de Andrés	4:12
7.	"Se acabó"	Rosendo Mercado	2:37

== Personnel ==
Leño

- Rosendo Mercado: guitar, lead vocals
- Chiqui Mariscal: bass (all but 3), backing vocals
- Tony Urbano: bass (3), backing vocals
- Ramiro Penas: drums, backing vocals

Additional personnel

- Teddy Bautista: harmonica, keyboards
