= Más madera =

Studio album by Leño
- Released: 1980
- Recorded: April 1980, Kirios Studios, Madrid
- Genre: Rock and roll, new wave
- Length: 32:14
- Language: Spanish
- Label: Chapa
- Producer: Teddy Bautista

Leño chronology
Leño (1979)	Más madera (1980)	En Directo (1981)

Más madera is the second studio album by the Spanish hard rock band Leño. It was recorded in March 1980, produced and arranged by Teddy Bautista and published by Chapa Discos that same year. The Spanish magazine Efe Eme ranked Más madera as the 142nd best Spanish rock album ever.

== Track listing ==
All songs written by Rosendo Mercado, Chiqui Mariscal and Ramiro Penas

Side one
No.	Title	Length
1.	"Insisto"	3:15
2.	"¿Dónde está la salvación?"	3:56
3.	"Sin solución"	3:04
4.	"No voy más lejos"	2:57
5.	"Como debe ser"	2:19

Side two
No.	Title	Length
6.	"¡Sí señor, sí señor!"	2:18
7.	"Cucarachas"	2:49
8.	"La noche de que te hablé"	2:59
9.	"Calendario"	3:25
10.	"Apágalas"	2:31
11.	"Lo que acabas de elegir"	2:20

== Personnel ==
Leño

- Rosendo Mercado: Guitar and vocals
- Ramiro Penas: Drums and backing vocals
- Tony Urbano: Bass guitar and backing vocals

Additional personnel

- Teddy Bautista: Keyboards
- Manolo Morales: Saxophone
- Luz Casal: Backing vocals
- Jaime Asúa: Backing vocals
