= Two Wounded Birds =

English rock band

Two Wounded Birds were an English rock and roll band, formed in Margate, Kent, in 2010. The band consisted of Johnny Danger (vocals, guitar), Ally Blackgrove (bass), Joe Stevens (guitar) and James Shand (drums). The band's sound had been compared to The Tornados, The Beach Boys, The Velvet Underground, Link Wray, and Phil Spector. The band had also been compared to The Drums, who discovered Two Wounded Birds in 2010, before taking them on their first European tour.

== History ==
In January 2011, Two Wounded Birds released the EP Keep Dreaming Baby. Three songs from the EP, Night Patrol, My Lonesome and Summer Dream were performed at BBC's Maida Vale Studios as part of a BBC Introducing Session for BBC Radio 1. The EP was followed by two further singles, "All We Wanna Do" and "Together Forever", which were released by Moshi Moshi Recordings. "All We Wanna Do" was chosen as Radio 1's Tip of the Week in August 2011.

At Glastonbury 2011, the band played Glastonbury's BBC Introducing Stage.

In June 2012, Two Wounded Birds released their self-titled debut album to good critical reception. NME gave the album 8/10, while The Fly, Q Magazine and Metro gave the album 4/5. One of the tracks was used in the 2015 film Hitman: Agent 47.

In 2012 Ally Blackgrove left the band, replaced by Sam Parker. On 6 November 2012, Two Wounded Birds announced via their Facebook and Twitter page that they had disbanded.

== Discography ==
- Two Wounded Birds (2012)

=== Singles ===
- "All We Wanna Do"
- "Together Forever"
