= Raúl Celis López =

Peruvian journalist (1954–2025)

Raúl Celis López (18 May 1954 – 7 May 2025) was a Peruvian journalist. At the time of his death he was the presenter of the early-morning show Hora Zero on Radio Karibeña. He was known for reporting on corruption and crime within Peru.

In 1994, Celis López was detained for contempt for two days in Iquitos, with the reasoning believed to be his ongoing media campaign exposing corruption in the region.

== Death ==
On 7 May 2025, Celis López was shot dead by two unidentified men on a motorbike in Iquitos. Reporters Without Borders and the Inter American Press Association condemned the attack, and more than 100 protestors assembled at the National Police headquarters in Iquitos to demand justice. One of the unidentified biker was then arrested and taken to custody who is now charged of the murder of López.
