= Radio Karibeña =

Peruvian radio station

Peru
- Frequencies: 94.9 MHz (Lima), others nationwide

Programming
- Format: Cumbia, salsa

Ownership
- Owner: Corporación Universal

History
- First air date: December 17, 1998

Links
- Website: lakaribena.com.pe

Radio Karibeña (better known as La Karibeña) is a Peruvian radio station. Its programming consists of tropical genres such as cumbia and salsa.

Its main station is OCZ-4T FM, which transmits on the frequency 94.9 MHz of the FM band in Lima. The station has several repeater stations nationwide and also broadcasts via the Internet. Its owner is Corporación Universal.

== History ==
Radio Karibeña began airing on December 17, 1998, in the cities of Chiclayo and Arequipa, as a station of cumbia, boleros, salsa, merengue and vallenato, on 97.3 MHz FM replacing its sister radio Radio Universal.

== Notable hosts ==
- Raúl Celis López (1954–2025), hosted Hora Zero. López was murdered in Iquitos whilst reporting.
