= Rosendo Mercado =

Spanish rock singer and songwriter (born 1954)

Rosendo
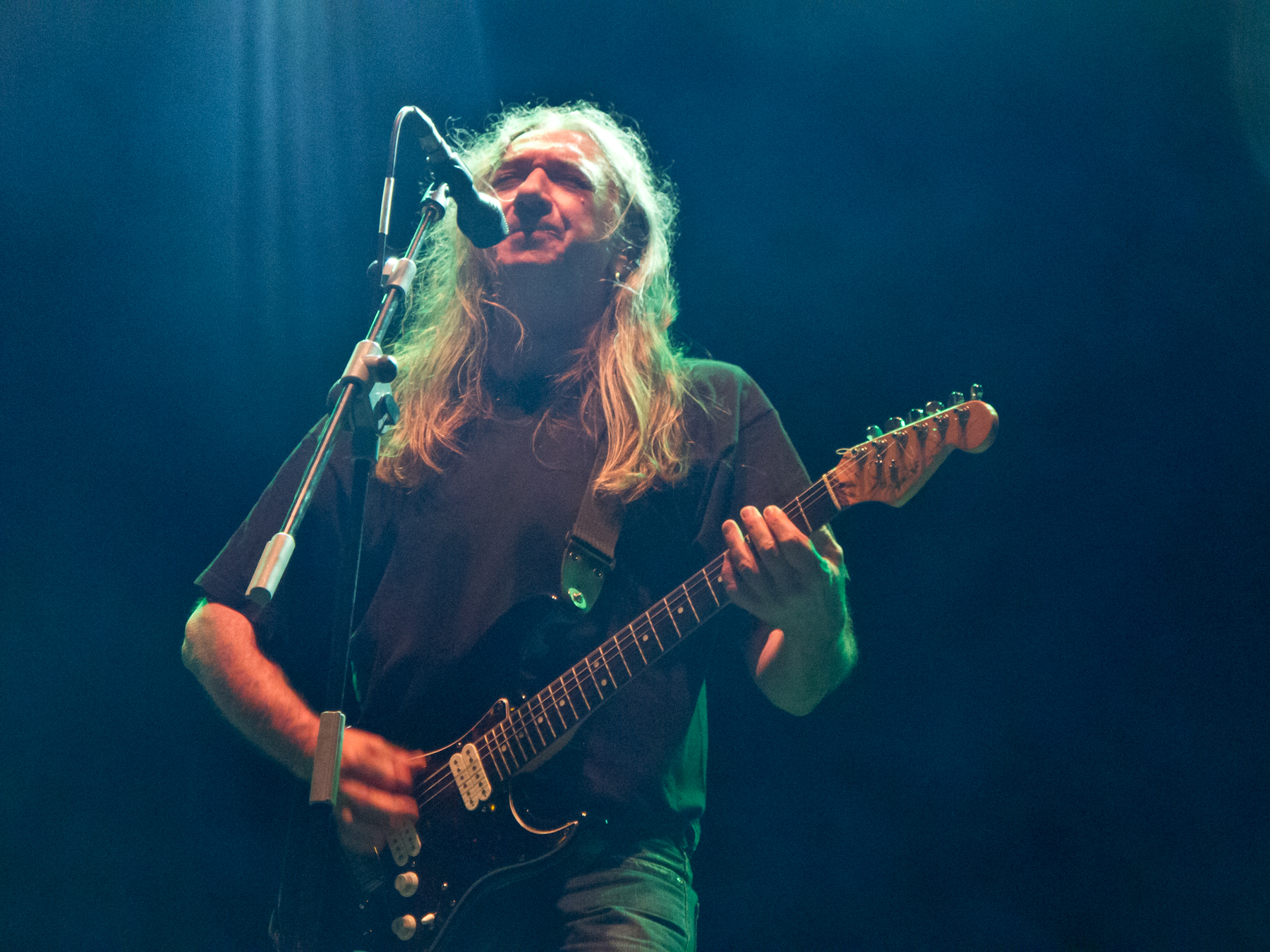
- Rosendo live in 2012

Background information
- Born: Rosendo Mercado Ruiz; 23 February 1954 (age 72); Madrid, Spain
- Genres: Hard rock; rock and roll; blues rock
- Occupations: Musician; songwriter
- Instruments: Vocals; guitar
- Years active: 1972–2019
- Website: Official website

Rosendo Mercado Ruiz (born 23 February 1954, Madrid, Spain) is a Spanish rock singer and songwriter. He was a member of bands Ñu and Leño, and is a prominent exponent of the so-called urban rock in Spain.

== Biography ==
=== First steps ===
His family was from Bolaños de Calatrava, in the province of Ciudad Real, but he was raised in Carabanchel, where he still resides (as of 2005). After dropping out of ICAI engineering school, he joined the band Fresa as a guitarist, in 1972. Fresa usually played covers of hits of the time, and sometimes they also backed other soloists and singers. Following some changes, including singer José Carlos Molina joining the band, this changed its name to Ñu. In 1974 Rosendo discovered Rory Gallagher's music, who became one of his main influences, together with other bands such as Jethro Tull, Canned Heat, Cream, Deep Purple and Black Sabbath.

=== Leño period ===
After being discharged from the compulsory military service in 1975, he took part in the recording of Ñu's first album. Molina and himself were not in very good terms, so Rosendo left the group in 1977. He then formed Leño, where he played the guitar and acted as a vocalist as well. Chiqui Mariscal (bass player) and Ramiro Penas (drums) also left Ñu to join him in Leño.

They made their debut in 1978, acting as the support band at an Asfalto's gig. They had been hired by Vicente Romero (producer). Romero was founding Chapa Discos ("Chapa Records") at that time, and published the collective disc Viva el Rollo, Vol. II. Rock del Manzanares, which included two Leño's songs: Este Madrid and Aprendiendo a escuchar.

Later in 1979 they published their first album, entitled Leño. It was produced by Teddy Bautista, and it characterises for including songs with long instrumental sections. Two songs: El tren and Este Madrid are remarkable. Chiqui Mariscal left the band in the middle of the recording sessions, and he was substituted by Tony Urbano; the disc sleeve portrays this fact.

In 1980 they published their second album, Más madera. It evidences Teddy Bautista's influence. The songs are shorter and have a lighter style.

In 1981 Leño recorded live En directo at the Carolina club in Madrid. Despite its poor sound quality, the disc made it quite well at the shops, granting great success to the band. It includes one of Rosendo's best-known songs, Maneras de vivir. Luz Casal (chorus) and Teddy Bautista (keyboards) played with them.

The last of their official releases is ¡Corre, corre!. This was made with more resources, due to the success of their previous live record. ¡Corre, corre! was recorded in London, and produced by Carlos Narea. Notable songs include Sorprendente and ¡Qué desilusión!.

1983 would see their last performances. Among Miguel Rios and Luz Casal, they took part in the tour Rock de una noche de verano. This was a long series of gigs all around Spain, featuring a set of lights and sound assets as they never had been seen before. The tour was organized by Miguel Ríos, and few years later it would be marked as a milestone in the Spanish rock history. At the end of the Rock the una noche de verano tour, in the fall of 1983, and when they were at their best and most successful moment, Leño members decided to split off.

=== Solo period ===
Rosendo's first solo disc (Loco por incordiar) was pushed back until 1985, due to problems with his former label, Zafiro (to which Chapa Discos belonged). The disc was edited by RCA, and produced by Carlos Narea. It marked the moment of greatest commercial success in his career, thanks to songs like Agradecido, Pan de higo or Loco por incordiar.

However, his next album, Fuera de lugar, edited next year, was negatively criticized. His last disc for RCA, ... a las lombrices, was published in 1987, and was received coldly. Jo Dworniak was the producer, and Rafael J. Vegas joined as a bass player.

After leaving RCA, Rosendo started recording with Twins. The first album with this label was Jugar al gua (1988), which features songs with a different style (e.g., the Del pulmón reggae), but also one of his key songs Flojos de pantalón. The second record for Twins was Directo (1989), a live disc including two songs by Leño.

Later Twins joined DRO, with whom Rosendo has kept on recording up to present (2005). The first album for DRO, Deja que les diga que no, appeared in 1991. Eugenio Muñoz took part in the production, as he did in later discs. Next year Rosendo published the disc La tortuga, containing a song that became quite popular: Majete.

With Para mal o para bien (1994), he recorded for the first time in the El Cortijo del Aire studio, in the Cabo de Gata. Some outstanding songs are ¿De qué vas? and Hasta de perfil. The latter criticizes power and three members of Celtas Cortos collaborated on the song.

His next album, Listos para la reconversión was published in 1996. After that disc two of his musicians left, namely the keyboard player Gustavo Di Nóbile and the drummer Miguel Ángel Jiménez. Next year he recorded the soundtrack of Hector Carré's movie Dame algo, and in 1998 he changed the setup of the band to a trio (bass, drums and guitar, giving up the keyboard), and changed his lifelong Fender Stratocaster guitar for a Gibson, allegedly for its looks. The first disc of this stage is A tientas y barrancas (1998), followed in 1999 by Siempre hay una historia... en directo, which he recorded live in the yard of the Carabanchel prison.

In 2001 Canciones para normales y mero dementes was published. This disc features a harder sound, which was also present in Veo, veo... mamoneo (2002). In 2005 Lo malo es... ni darse cuenta was released.

In 2006 he was awarded the Medalla de Oro al Mérito en las Bellas Artes.

His latest album, El endémico embustero y el incauto pertinaz, released in 2007, was recorded in the PKO (Madrid) and El Cortijo (Almería) studios.

== Members ==
- Rosendo Mercado – Composer, singer, guitar, bass
- Rafa J. Vegas – Bass
- Mariano Montero – drums
- Miguel A. Jiménez – drums
- Gustavo Di Nobile – Keyboard, programmer

== Discography ==
=== With Leño ===
- Leño (1979)
- Más madera (1980)
- En Directo (1981) (Live album)
- ¡Corre, corre! (1982)
- Vivo '83 (2006) (Live album)

=== As a solo artist ===
- Loco por Incordiar – 1985
- Fuera de Lugar – 1986
- ... A las Lombrices – 1987
- Jugar al gua – 1988
- Directo – 1990 (Live album)
- Deja que les diga que No! – 1991
- La Tortuga – 1992
- Para mal o para bien – 1994
- Listos para la reconversión – 1996
- Dame algo B.S.O – 1997
- A tientas y Barrancas – 1998
- Siempre Hay una Historia …en Directo – 1999 (Live album)
- Canciones para Normales y Mero Dementes – 2001
- Veo, Veo ... Mamoneo!! – 2002
- Salud y Buenos Alimentos – 2004
- Lo malo es... ni darse cuenta – 2005
- El endémico embustero y el incauto pertinaz – 2007
- Otra noche sin dormir (with Barricada and Aurora Beltrán) – 2008 (Live album)
- A veces cuesta llegar al estribillo – 2010
- En el Palau de la Música de Barcelona 07.05.11 – 2011 (Live album)
- Vergüenza torera – 2013
- Directo en las Ventas 27-9-14 – 2014 (Live album)
- De escalde y trinchera – 2017
