= El Río (Miguel Ríos song) =

"El Rio" (The River) is a 1968 song by Miguel Ríos, composed by Fernando Arbex. The song was the artist's first major hit. and has been covered by other artists including Joan Manuel Serrat.
