= Nicolás Lúcar =

Peruvian journalist

Jorge Arturo Nicolás Lúcar de la Portilla has been a Peruvian journalist since the 1980s. In 1991 he started his first investigative news program in América Televisión called "La revista dominical" roughly translated in English as "The Sunday report", it featured almost the same format as used in the long-running CBS News Sunday newsmagazine 60 Minutes. The show at the time was considered one of the most outstanding newsprograms, and it used to be on the top of the ratings during almost all the 1990s. The program lasted until 1999 when low ratings pushed América Televisión executives to mark the end of the show.

At the end of the Fujimori era in Peru, in the early 2000s, Lúcar's career was highly discredited, after he showed in a new Sunday program called Tiempo Nuevo (translated "A New Time") a videotape where he interviewed a supposed agent associated to Vladimiro Montesinos who in some way claimed to be connected to the newly interim President elected in Peru, Valentín Paniagua. The president called some minutes after the report was shown and he argued with Lúcar on the air, and as a result the journalist was forced to resign on the following day. Scandals of corruption involving his wife's family soon appeared on the following days and he finally left Peru for a couple of weeks.

Nicolás Lúcar returned to Peruvian media in 2005 in a different channel, ATV (Andina de Televisión) a private Peruvian network and one of the most highly watched in Peru. His new program is called "Dia D" in some sort of allusion to D-Day (showing, perhaps a sign of a time strike back on media).

Lúcar's new show has the same format as he used on "La revista dominical". The new program has gained some popularity in Peru, and he has nearly encompassed on the ratings for Jaime Bayly's show "El Francotirador" (translated to "The Straight shooter or The sniper").

The public opinion in Peru has changed towards Nicolás Lúcar over the years; however nowadays Peruvians are divided over Lúcar, regarding him as a dishonest figure.

== See also ==
- Investigative journalism
- Bill Kurtis
