= Miguel Ríos =

Spanish singer and composer (born 1944)

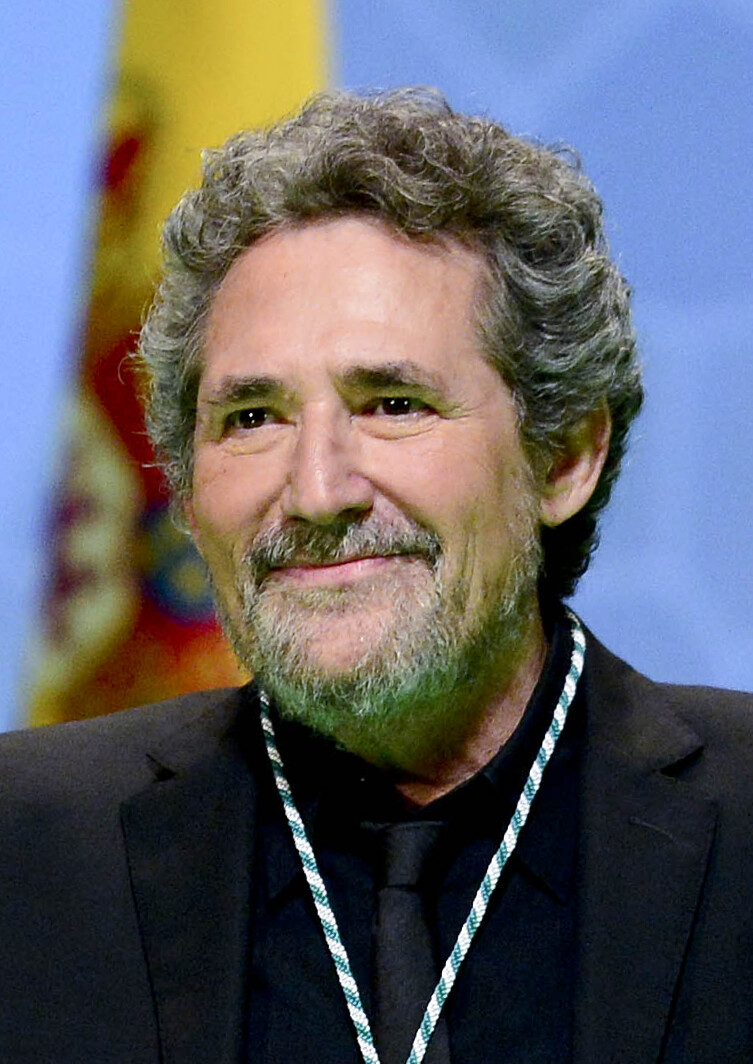
- Miguel Ríos, 2014

Background information
- Also known as: Mike Ríos
- Born: Miguel Ríos Campaña; 7 June 1944 (age 81); Granada, Spain
- Genres: Rock and roll; progressive rock; blues rock; latin rock; arena rock; symphonic rock; pop; jazz; new wave; baroque pop
- Occupations: Singer, composer
- Instrument: Vocals
- Years active: 1961–present
- Label: A&M Records

Miguel Ríos Campaña (born 7 June 1944) is a Spanish singer and composer. He is one of the pioneers of rock and roll in Spain.

== Biography ==
Ríos was born in La Cartuja, a neighborhood of Granada. He is one of nine children. He went to work in a local bar at the age of fifteen after little formal education. His interest in rock and roll led him to participate in a song contest at Cenicienta 60 radio station, in which he and his friends won a prize for singing the Paul Anka song "You Are My Destiny".

With his mother's permission (his father had died a few months earlier), he moved to Madrid in 1961 at the age of sixteen, where he recorded his first four songs. In popular circles he became known as Mike Ríos, the King of Twist.

As Mike Ríos he obtained some television popularity during the first half of the 1960s. In 1964 he resumed using his real name which cost him the support of his group, Los Relámpagos (the Lightning). He made his first incursion into cinema with a movie titled Dos chicas locas, locas ("Two Crazy Girls").

An introspective search for his true identity resulted in some rocky times. In 1967 he recorded "Vuelvo a Granada", "El río", "Contra el cristal", "El cartel", and "Mira hacia ti". It was in 1970 that he came to be known as a superstar in Spain. His song "Himno de la alegría" (Hymn of Joy) was an extract of the last movement of the ninth symphony of Beethoven and appeared at the height of what was known as symphonic rock. It was released in both North America and the United Kingdom as "A Song of Joy" in May 1970 on the A&M Records label, where combined sales in the U.S. and Canada reached the one million mark in July. It reached No. 16 in the UK singles charts in August 1970. It was awarded a gold record by the Recording Industry Association of America. The song peaked at number 1 in Australia and Canada.

Ríos sold three million copies worldwide and was number one on some foreign music charts. It reached Number 14 on the Billboard Hot 100 chart in 1970.

His next single, Like An Eagle, reached number 72 in Canada and number 29 in Australia.

The artistic career of Rios came to a sudden stop when, in 1972, he was arrested and jailed for smoking marijuana shortly after his Rock y Amor (Rock and Love) concert. In the mid seventies he recorded three progressive rock albums, but they were not commercially successful.

In 1980, one of his most successful songs, "Santa Lucía", a ballad by Argentinian Roque Narvaja, appeared in his Rocanrol bumerang album.

In 1982, Rios released Rock and Rios a live double album recorded during the 5 and 6 March in Madrid at the Pabellón del Real Madrid and published in June of the same year. This album is considered by many music critics and fans as one of the most important works of modern Spanish (Iberian) rock and a turning point for the music industry in Spain. Rios sold over 450,000 copies in less than one year, a feat he never again came close to surpassing. Ironically this concert was a celebration of his 20 years in the music business, yet most of the audience members had not even been born when he began his career. One of the unique aspects of this album was its release. While most live albums at the time were released after a tour was over, Rios released his at the same time as he started his tour. The success of both made him one of the wealthiest entertainers of the era. Rock and Rios is also considered a cultural marker for the transformation of Spanish society, as it slowly begun to enjoy the freedoms of a democracy born only six years earlier. It is also thought of as the precursor to Spain's "La Gran Movida" (literal translation: The Great Movement or The Great Flow - conceptual translation: The Great Vibe) or La Movida Madrileña, which is a term that loosely defines the street youth culture of the 1980s in Spain.

In 1983, Miguel Ríos published his tenth studio album, The rock of a summer night, with which he made his biggest tour, accompanied by artists such as Luz Casal and Leño as opening acts. . Ríos fills 32 soccer fields and bullrings throughout Spain, with an attendance of more than 700,000 spectators.

A year later he published the album La encrucijada and in 1985, Rock en el ruedo, a compilation with his greatest hits to date and which included an unreleased song. The new tour was a commercial failure and we had to wait until 1986 to be able to listen to a new album by the Granada singer, The Year of the Comet.

== Discography ==
- Mira hacia ti (1969)
- Despierta (1970)
- Unidos (1971)
- Miguel Ríos en directo: Conciertos de Rock y amor (1972)
- Miguel Ríos: Éxitos (1973)
- Memorias de un ser humano (1974)
- La huerta atómica (1976)
- Al-Andalus (1977)
- Los viejos rokeros nunca mueren (1979)
- Rocanrol bumerang (1980) – Spain: Gold
- Extraños en el escaparate (1981) – Spain: Gold
- Rock and Rios (1982) – Spain 3× Platinum
- El Rock de una noche de verano (1983)
- La encrucijada (1984) – Spain: Gold
- Lo más de rock en el ruedo (1985)
- El año del cometa (1986)
- Que noche la de aquel año (1987)
- Miguel Ríos (1989)
- Directo al corazón (1991)
- Así que pasen treinta años (1992)
- Por siempre (1995)
- Canciones de amor para tiempos difíciles (1995)
- Como si fuera la primera vez (1996)
- Miguel Ríos en concierto: Big Band Ríos (1998)
- Ana Belén, Miguel Ríos cantan a Kurt Weill (1999)
- Miguel Ríos y las estrellas del rock latino (2001)
- 60mp3 (2004)
- Solo o en compañía de otros (2008)
- Bye Bye Ríos (2010)
- Symphonic Ríos CD + DVD (2018)
- Un largo tiempo (2021)
