= Leño =

Spanish hard rock band

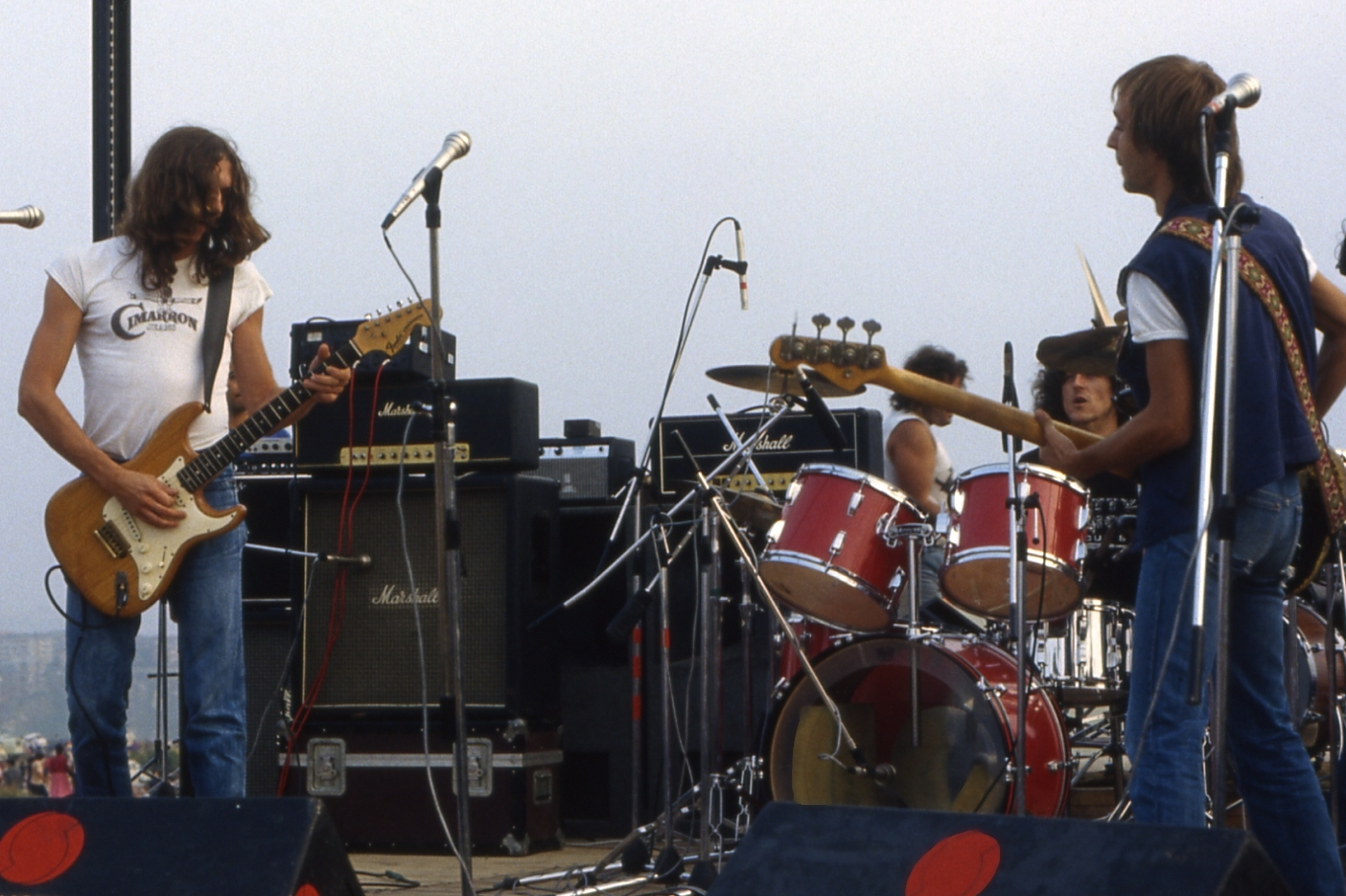
- Leño playing live in 1981. From L-R: Rosendo Mercado (guitar), Ramiro Penas (drums) and Tony Urbano (bass).

Background information
- Origin: Madrid, Spain
- Genres: Hard rock blues rock
- Years active: 1978–1983
- Labels: Chapa/Zafiro; Sony BMG
- Members: Rosendo Mercado; Ramiro Penas; Chiqui Mariscal; Tony Urbano

Leño was a Spanish hard rock band created in 1978 in Madrid.

The band members were Rosendo Mercado as guitarist and vocalist, Chiqui Mariscal as bassist and Ramiro Penas on drums. When they started to record their first album Leño, Chiqui Mariscal left the band and Tony Urbano entered as the new bassist in order to complete the recording. This line up would continue until their break-up in 1983 at their peak of popularity. In 2012 the band was ranked number 13 on Rolling Stone's "50 Greatest Spanish rock bands".

== History ==
After finishing the compulsory military service in 1975, Rosendo took part recording the first album for the band Ñu. Molina and he were not on very good terms, so Rosendo left the group in 1977, and formed Leño, playing the guitar and singing. Chiqui Mariscal (bass player) and Ramiro Penas (drums) also left Ñu to join him in Leño.

They made their debut in 1978, as supporting band in a concert of Asfalto. They had been hired by Vicente Romero, who was setting up Chapa Discos ("Chapa Records"), and published the collective disc Viva el Rollo, Vol. II. Rock del Manzanares, including two songs: Este Madrid and Aprendiendo a escuchar.

In 1979 they published their first album, titled Leño. The album, produced by Teddy Bautista, contains songs with long instrumental sections, among which El tren and Este Madrid are remarkable. During the recording Mariscal left the group, and was substituted by Tony Urbano, as portrayed in the disc cover. Later it would be ranked as the 106th best Rock en Español album according to American magazine Al Borde.

In 1980 they published their second album, Más madera. Teddy Bautista's influence can be seen in that the songs are shorter and have a lighter style.

In 1981 they recorded in the Carolina club the En directo live disc. The disc sold very well, even though the recording quality was not very good. This disc includes one of Rosendo's best-known songs, Maneras de vivir. Luz Casal (chorus) and Teddy Bautista (keyboards) play with them.

The last official disc of Leño, ¡Corre, corre!, was made with more resources, thanks to the success of their previous one. It was recorded at Ian Gillan's recording studio located in London, with the production of Carlos Narea. Notable songs include Sorprendente and ¡Qué desilusión!. Later, in 2012 the album would be ranked number 19 on Rolling Stone's "50 Greatest Spanish rock albums".

In 1983 they took part in Rock de una noche de verano, a tour organized by Miguel Ríos that would become a milestone in the Spanish rock history, by organizing a long series of concerts all around Spain, with big sound and light resources. In the 1983 fall, in their best success moment, they decided to break up. Chiqui Mariscal died in 2008. In 2010, the band reunited for the release of their album tribute Bajo la corteza: 26 canciones de Leño to perform a short concert.

== Discography ==
=== Studio albums ===
- Leño – 1979
- Más madera – 1980
- ¡Corre, corre! – 1982

=== Live albums ===
- En Directo – 1981
- Vivo '83 – 2006

=== Singles ===
- Este Madrid / Aprendiendo a escuchar(non-album single) – 1978
- El tren – 1980
- El oportunista – 1980
- La noche de que te hablé / Sin solución" – 1980
- Maneras de vivir (Studio version) / Todo es más sencillo*(non-album single) – 1981
- Corre, corre / Sorprendente – 1982
- Que tire la toalla! / Sorprendente – 1982
- Maneras de vivir (CD single, BMG) – 1997

=== Compilation albums ===
- Maneras de vivir – 1997
- Indirecto – 1992
- Nos va la marcha (Soundtrack) – 1978
- Bajo la corteza: 26 canciones de Leño (Tribute) – 2010

=== Box Sets ===
- Leño 1978-1983 – 2013
