= Iros todos a tomar por culo =

Live album

Live album by Extremoduro
- Released: 21 April 1997
- Recorded: 1996
- Genre: Hard rock
- Length: 72:29
- Label: DRO
- Producer: Iñaki "Uoho" Antón

Extremoduro chronology
Agila (1996)	Iros todos a tomar por culo (1997)	Canciones Prohibidas (1998)

Iros todos a tomar por culo (English: All of You Go Fuck Yourselves) is a live album by Spanish hard rock band Extremoduro. It was produced by Iñaki "Uoho" Antón and published by Dro Records in 1997. It was recorded during the tour which promoted their album Agila, performed along with the band Platero y Tú.

== Track listing ==
No.	Title	Concert	Length
1.	"Amor castúo" (from Rock transgresivo)	Sevilla, Auditorio de la Cartuja de Sevilla, 18/10/1996	4:04
2.	"Buscando una luna" (from Agila)	Sevilla, Auditorio de la Cartuja de Sevilla, 18/10/1996	4:11
3.	"De acero" (from Deltoya)	Asturias, Sala Cuattro de Aviles, 01/11/1996	3:46
4.	"Correcaminos, estate al loro" (from Agila)	Asturias, Sala Cuattro de Aviles, 01/11/1996	2:50
5.	"La hoguera" (from Rock transgresivo)	Navarra, Sala Gares de Puente la Reina, 25/10/1996	4:17
6.	"Jesucristo García" (from Rock transgresivo)	Madrid, Palacio de los Deportes, 08-09/11/1996	6:33
7.	"Tu corazón" (from Somos unos animales)	Madrid, Palacio de los Deportes, 08-09/11/1996	5:08
8.	"Bri, bri, bli, bli" (from ¿Dónde están mis amigos?)	Madrid, Palacio de los Deportes, 08-09/11/1996	3:24
9.	"Quemando tus recuerdos" (from Somos unos animales)	Madrid, Palacio de los Deportes, 08-09/11/1996	5:54
10.	"La carrera" (from Agila)	Madrid, Palacio de los Deportes, 08-09/11/1996	2:35
11.	"Pepe Botika" (from ¿Dónde están mis amigos?)	Madrid, Palacio de los Deportes, 08-09/11/1996	4:38
12.	"Deltoya" (from Deltoya)	Madrid, Palacio de los Deportes, 08-09/11/1996	5:47
13.	"Pedrá (fragmento)" (from Pedrá)	Madrid, Palacio de los Deportes, 08-09/11/1996	11:23
14.	"Ama, Ama, Ama y ensancha el alma" (from Deltoya)	Madrid, Palacio de los Deportes, 08-09/11/1996	6:04

== Personnel ==
Extremoduro

- Roberto "Robe" Iniesta – Guitar and vocals
- Ramón "Mon" Sogas – Bass and backing vocals
- Alberto "Capi" Gil – Drums
- Iñaki "Milindris" Setién – Guitar

Platero y tú

- Iñaki "Uoho" Antón – Guitar
- Fito Cabrales – Backing vocals, percussion instrument and vocals
- Juantxu Olano – Bass
- Jesús García – Drums

== Charts and certifications ==
=== Chart performance ===
Chart (1997)	Peak position
Spanish Album Charts	3

=== Certifications ===
Region	Certification	Certified units/sales
Spain (PROMUSICAE)	Platinum	100,000^{^}
^{^} Shipments figures based on certification alone.
