= Besos de perro =

Studio album by Marea
- Released: 19 April 2002
- Recorded: February–April 2002, La Casa de Iñaki
- Genre: Hard rock
- Length: 47:06
- Language: Spanish
- Label: DRO
- Producer: Iñaki Antón

Marea chronology
| Revolcón (2000) | Besos de perro (2002) | 28000 puñaladas (2004) |

Besos de perro is the third studio album by Spanish rock band Marea released on 19 April 2002. With their third label contract signed in as many years, Marea went about recording their third album in February 2002 with producer Iñaki "Uoho" Antón, a guitarist in the bands Extremoduro and Platero y Tú. Besos de Perro was recorded over the course of two months in the home studio of Antón and features numerous contributions from outside musicians, including Roberto Iniesta (aka Robe, of Extremoduro), Fito Cabrales (of Platero y Tú and Fito & Fitipaldis), and Martín Romero (Kutxi's brother).

== Track listing ==
1. "Romance de Jose Etxailarena" - 04:13
2. "El rastro" - 04:10
3. "La luna me sabe a poco" - 04:24
4. "A la mierda primavera" - 05:19
5. "En tu agujero" (feat. Roberto Iniesta) - 05:02
6. "Manuela canta saetas" - 03:53
7. "Alfileres" - 03:19
8. "Me estoy quedando solo" (feat. Martín Romero) - 04:00
9. "Venas con humo y palabras" - 04:35
10. "Como el viento de poniente" - 03:42
11. "Pan duro" (feat. Fito Cabrales) - 03:41

== Certifications ==
| Region | Certification | Certified units/sales |
|---|---|---|
| Spain (Promusicae) | Gold | 50,000^{^} |
^{^} Shipments figures based on certification alone.
