= Rock Transgresivo =

1989 studio album by Extremoduro

Tú en Tu casa, Nosotros en la Hoguera

Studio album by Extremoduro
- Released: 1989
- Recorded: 1989, M-20 Studios
- Genre: Hard rock
- Length: 31:48
- Language: Spanish
- Label: Avispa
- Producer: Extremoduro

Extremoduro chronology
Tú en Tu casa, Nosotros en la Hoguera (1989)	Somos unos Animales (1991)

Rock Transgresivo is the debut album of the Spanish hard rock band Extremoduro. After recording their demo tape Rock Transgresivo in January 1989, they released their first studio album Tú en Tu Casa, Nosotros en la Hoguera. The result left them unsatisfied so the original demo tape was remixed and partially re-recorded and it was released in August 1994 in order to replace the older studio album.

== Background, recording and production ==
In 1987 the band was on hiatus when Roberto Iniesta decided to come back with Salo and Luis "von Fanta" as new members in 1988. They didn't have enough money for recording a studio album so they sold tickets that would be exchanged for the album. When they sold 250 tickets they had earned enough money to afford the recording. At January 1989 they started the recording of their first 7 songs on Duplimatic Studios in Madrid, containing Extremaydura, Emparedado, Decidí, Romperás, Arrebato, Jesucristo García, La Hoguera.

The distribution of the demo tape Rock Transgresivo began to attract attention inside and outside their home region of Plasencia; it was so well received that the Catalan television program Plastic invited them for a live performance. They were then selected for the national final of the Yamaha trophy in which they finished third.

After their appearance on the TV, Avispa Music noticed them and offered them a three-year contract. The album was recorded that summer, containing the same songs as Rock Transgresivo (in addition to "Amor Castúo"). It was made "in a big hurry and with few resources," so that from the outset the result left them unsatisfied. Technical and economic problems with the label started during the recording session, so a few years later they decided to re-release the album.

== Track listing ==
All songs written by Roberto Iniesta.

No.	Title	Length
1.	"La hoguera"	4:31
2.	"Extremaydura"	3:29
3.	"Romperás"	3:54
4.	"Amor Castúo"	4:21
5.	"Decidí"	2:46
6.	"Jesucristo García"	5:04
7.	"Emparedado"	4:37
8.	"Arrebato"	3:27

== Rock Transgresivo (1994) ==
Rock Transgresivo

Studio album (remixed) by Extremoduro
- Released: 26 August 1994
- Recorded: January 1989, Duplimatic Studios; 1994, Lorentzo Records
- Genre: Hard rock
- Length: 35:55
- Language: Spanish
- Label: DRO
- Producer: Extremoduro and Iñaki Antón

Extremoduro chronology
¿Dónde Están Mis Amigos? (1993)	Rock Transgresivo (1994)	Pedrá (1995)

In 1994 they decided to remix the original demo, adding some new guitar and keyboard takes, so that it would replace their first studio album. This new album includes three additional tracks compared to the demo tape. It was released on 26 August 1994.

=== Track listing ===
All songs written by Roberto Iniesta.

No.	Title	Length
1.	"Extremaydura"	3:17
2.	"Emparedado"	4:14
3.	"Decidí"	2:30
4.	"Romperás"	3:31
5.	"Adiós, abanico, que llegó el aire"	3:37
6.	"Arrebato"	3:23
7.	"Jesucristo García"	4:50
8.	"La hoguera"	3:56
9.	"Te juzgarán sólo por tus errores (Yo no)"	2:59
10.	"Caballero andante (¡No me dejéis asíii!)"	2:32

2011 edition bonus tracks
No.	Title	Length
11.	"Amor castúo (2004 version)"	3:26
12.	"Extremaydura (remixed)"	3:25
13.	"Jesucristo García (2004 version)"	4:36
14.	"Decidí (2004 version)"	2:32
15.	"Arrebato (2004 version)"	3:41

=== Charts ===
Chart performance for Rock Transgresivo
Chart (2025)	Peak position
Spanish Albums (PROMUSICAE)	83

Chart (2026)	Peak position
Spanish Albums (PROMUSICAE)	79

=== Certifications ===
Region	Certification	Certified units/sales
Spain (PROMUSICAE)	Gold	50,000^{^}
^{^} Shipments figures based on certification alone.

== Personnel ==
Extremoduro

- Robe Iniesta: Guitar and vocals
- Salo: Bass
- Luis "von Fanta": Drums

Additional Personnel for 1994 version

- Iñaki Buenrostro: Triangle
- Iñaki "Uoho" Antón (Platero y Tú): Guitar and keyboards
- Juantxu Olano (Platero y Tú): Bass (in the new songs)
- Iratxe (Quattro Clavos): Backing vocals
