= Inconscientes (band) =

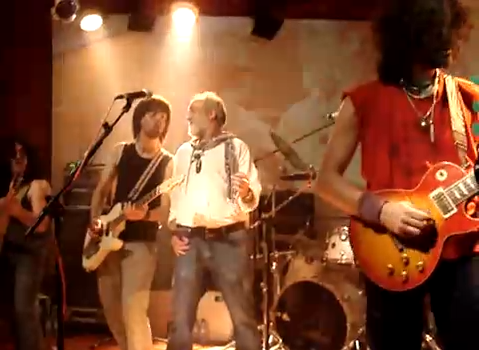
- Inconscientes playing live featuring Manolo Chinato (centre).

Background information
- Origin: Bilbao, Vizcaya, Spain
- Genres: Hard rock, rock & roll
- Years active: 2006–2018
- Labels: Muxik
- Members: Iñaki "Uoho" Antón; Jon Calvo; Miguel Colino; José Ignacio Cantera

Inconscientes (Spanish pronunciation: [iŋkonsˈθjentes]) was a Spanish hard rock band founded by Iñaki "Uoho" Antón, former guitarist of Platero y Tú and Extremoduro. Their music style resembles the aforementioned bands, mainly influenced by classic rock bands such as Deep Purple or Status Quo.

== History ==
At late 2006, Extremoduro's frontman Roberto Iniesta declared that he was uninspired and the band wouldn't tour or release new albums. However, Iñaki Antón decided to form a new band parallel to Extremoduro. Antón who had recently created his own label Muxik to release albums of new rock bands, he joined to his bandmates Miguel Colino and José Ignacio Cantera and a new rock vocalist, bandmember of Memoria de Pez, Jon Calvo. At first, the band would be named as La Inconsciencia de Uoho but later was changed to Inconscientes. The album was recorded at Antón's home studio located in Vizcaya and was mastered by Tony Cousins in London (Metropoli Mastering). The recording lasted from December 10, 2006 to January 21, 2007. Finally their first studio album La Inconsciencia de Uoho was released on February 27, 2007 under Muxik label. The tour began on March 16 at the Sagarrondotik Festival in Hernani. During their tour, there were collaborations of Juantxu Olano (ex-Platero y Tú, current La Gripe), poet Manolo Chinato and José Alberto Batiz (ex-Fito & Fitipaldis). They covered songs of Platero y Tú, Extremoduro and Extrechinato y Tú, in addition to playing their own songs.

== Members ==
- Iñaki "Uoho" Antón – Guitar
- Jon Calvo – Vocals and Guitar
- Miguel Colino – Bass
- José Ignacio Cantera – Drums

== Discography ==
=== Album ===
Album Title	Album details	Peak chart positions
Album Title	Album details	SPA
La Inconsciencia de Uoho	Released: February 27, 2007; Label: Muxik; Format: CD	98
Quimeras y otras realidades	Released: December 9, 2016; Label: El Dromedario Records; Format: CD	–
No somos viento	Released: May 18, 2018; Label: El Dromedario Records; Format: CD	–
