= Hay Poco Rock & Roll =

Studio album by Platero y Tú
- Released: 23 September 1994
- Recorded: May 1994
- Genre: Rock and roll, hard rock, blues rock
- Length: 46:16
- Language: Spanish
- Label: DRO
- Producer: Platero y Tú

Platero y Tú chronology
| Vamos Tirando (1993) | Hay Poco Rock & Roll (1994) | A Pelo (1996) |

Singles from Hay Poco Rock & Roll
- 1. "Si la tocas otra vez" 2. "Hay poco rock'n'roll" 3. "Juliette"

Hay Poco Rock & Roll is the fifth studio album by Spanish rock band Platero y Tú. It was produced by Platero y Tú, recorded in May 1994 and published by DRO on 23 September 1994.

The song "Hay Poco Rock & Roll" is a DLC song in the Rock Band series.

== Track listing ==
| No. | Title | Writer(s) | Length |
|---|---|---|---|
| 1. | "Somos los Platero (pa' lo bueno y pa' lo malo)" | Iñaki Antón / Fito Cabrales | 6:46 |
| 2. | "Hay poco Rock & Roll" | Iñaki Antón / Fito Cabrales | 5:31 |
| 3. | "Por fin...!!" | Iñaki Antón / Fito Cabrales | 3:14 |
| 4. | "Tenemos que entrar" | Iñaki Antón / Fito Cabrales | 4:21 |
| 5. | "Si la tocas otra vez" | Fito / Iñaki / Juantxu / Jesús | 4:09 |
| 6. | "Juliette (feat. Roberto Iniesta and Evaristo Páramos)" | Iñaki Antón / Fito Cabrales | 3:43 |
| 7. | "La vecina" | Juantxu / Iñaki / Fito | 5:28 |
| 8. | "Bebiendo del mismo vaso" | Juantxu / Jesús / Iñaki / Fito | 3:14 |
| 9. | "La noche" | Iñaki Antón / Fito Cabrales | 3:58 |
| 10. | "Maldita mujer" | Juantxu / Jesús / Iñaki / Fito | 6:10 |

== Personnel ==
- Fito Cabrales: Vocals and guitar.
- Iñaki "Uoho" Antón: Guitar.
- Juantxu Olano: Bass.
- Jesús García: Drums.

== Certifications ==
| Region | Certification | Certified units/sales |
|---|---|---|
| Spain (PROMUSICAE) | Platinum | 100,000^{^} |
^{^} Shipments figures based on certification alone.
