= Agila (album) =

Studio album by Extremoduro
- Released: 23 February 1996
- Recorded: November 20, 1995 – December 1995
- Studio: Estudios BOX
- Genres: Hard rock; heavy metal
- Length: 43:22
- Language: Spanish
- Label: DRO
- Producer: Iñaki "Uoho" Antón

Extremoduro chronology
Pedrá (1995)	Agila (1996)	Iros Todos a Tomar por Culo (1997)

Agila (Spanish dialect Castúo for "Liven up") is the sixth studio album by Spanish hard rock band Extremoduro. Recorded in 1995, produced by Iñaki "Uoho" Antón and released on 23 February 1996.

Agila is often considered to be their breakthrough album. Arguably their most popular album, was published in 1996, a year after its preceding album, Pedrá, it featured instruments that had not appeared before on any of Extremoduro's albums. It includes some of the most famous songs by the band: "So payaso", "Buscando una luna", "Prometeo", "Sucede" and "El día de la bestia", which was included on the movie of the same name soundtrack.

It was during the tour that followed the album’s release as part of its promotion that Extremoduro’s only live album, Iros todos a tomar por culo, was recorded.

== Track listing ==
No.	Title	Writer(s)	Length
1.	"Buscando una luna"	Roberto Iniesta	4:13
2.	"Prometeo"	Roberto Iniesta	3:29
3.	"Sucede"	Roberto Iniesta	3:09
4.	"So payaso"	Roberto Iniesta	4:43
5.	"El día de la bestia"	Roberto Iniesta	4:46
6.	"Tomás"	Roberto Iniesta	1:29
7.	"¡Qué sonrisa tan rara!"	Roberto Iniesta	3:18
8.	"Cabezabajo"	Roberto Iniesta	3:42
9.	"Ábreme el pecho y registra"	Roberto Iniesta	3:32
10.	"Todos me dicen"	Roberto Iniesta	4:13
11.	"Correcaminos, estate al loro"	Roberto Iniesta / Ramone	2:34
12.	"La carrera"	Roberto Iniesta / Zosi Pascual	2:18
13.	"Me estoy quitando"	Roberto González / Pedro Ramírez/ José Manuel Ramírez / Jesús Ortiz	2:12

2011 edition bonus tracks

No.	Title	Writer(s)	Length
14.	"Sucede (Nueva Mezcla 2004)"	Roberto Iniesta	3:05

== Personnel ==
Extremoduro

- Roberto "Robe" Iniesta – vocals; acoustic and electric guitars; keyboards on #10
- Iñaki "Milindris" Setién – guitars except on #04, 09, 12, 13
- Ramón "Mon" Sogas – bass except on #04, 07, 09, 13
- Alberto "Capi" Gil – drums except on #04, 05, 09, 13

Additional personnel

- Iñaki "Uoho" Antón – guitars except on 06, 07, 09, 10, 13; bass on #04, 07, 09; keyboards on #01, 05, 10; piano on #04; hammond organ on #11; percussion on #02, 03, 08, 11, 14
- Fito Cabrales – Spanish guitar on #06; 13; cajón on #13
- Albert Pla – vocals on #07
- José Sañudo – saxophone on #01, 02, 03, 06, 08, 10, 14; flute on #13
- Sergio (Ratanera) – drums on #04, 09
- Pepegu (Ratanera) – bass on #04, 09
- Isaac (Ratanera) – guitars on #04, 09
- Sime – trombone on #04
- "Reverendo" – hammond organ on #06
- Josu Monje – programming on #05; drums on #05
- Elena – chorus on #05

== Charts and certifications ==
=== Chart performance ===
Chart (1996)	Peak position
Spanish Album Charts	13

Chart (2021)	Peak position
Spanish Album Charts	81

=== Certifications ===
Region	Certification	Certified units/sales
Spain (Promusicae)	2× Platinum	200,000^{^}
^{^} Shipments figures based on certification alone.

== Reception ==
Professional ratings
Review scores
Source	Rating
El País	4.5/5 stars

Rolling Stone magazine referred to it as a masterpiece of the Spanish rock. In 2007 it was ranked by American magazine Al Borde as the 227th best Ibero-American album of all time, being a relative low position because at the time of the album's release the band was still unknown to Latin America. In 2012 was ranked as the 12th best album of the Spanish rock according to Rolling Stone.

The track "So payaso" was ranked as the 103rd best song of the rock en español ever by the magazine Al borde, in addition to winning the award for best music video of the Spanish Music Awards in 1997. Likewise, it was included as DLC in the video game Guitar Hero III: Legends of Rock.
