= Gira 2002 =

Video by Extremoduro
- Released: 3 May 2004
- Recorded: 2002
- Genre: Hard rock, punk rock
- Length: 116 min
- Label: DRO

Gira 2002 is a live concert DVD documenting Spanish rock band Extremoduro’s Gira 2002 (2002 Tour) released on 3 May 2004. The DVD includes footage from three concerts performed in 2002 in Leganés, Lesaka and Bilbao.

In 2020, the video was published by Warner Music as a streaming release featuring two additional unreleased tracks.

== Track listing ==
1. "A fuego"
2. "Buscando una luna"
3. "El duende del parque"
4. "Tu corazón"
5. "Hoy te la meto"
6. "Golfa"
7. "Quemando tus recuerdos"
8. "La vereda de la puerta de atrás"
9. "So payaso"
10. "Deltoya"
11. "La vieja"
12. "Autorretrato"
13. "Pedrá" (unreleased)
14. "Sucede" (unreleased)
15. "Pepe Botika"
16. "J.D. La central nuclear"
17. "Menamoro"
18. "Amor castúo"
19. "Salir"
20. "Standby"
21. "Ama, ama, ama y ensancha el alma"

=== Music videos ===
1. "So payaso"
2. "Esclarecido"
3. "A fuego"
4. "Puta"
5. "Standby"

== Chart positions ==
=== DVD charts ===
Chart (2004)	Peak position
Spanish DVD Charts	1

== Certifications ==
Region	Certification	Certified units/sales
Spain (PROMUSICAE)	Gold	10,000^{^}
^{^} Shipments figures based on certification alone.

== Personnel ==
Extremoduro

- Roberto Iniesta - vocals, guitar
- Iñaki "Uoho" Antón, guitar
- Miguel Colino - bass guitar
- Jose Ignacio Cantera - drums

Additional personnel

- Félix Landa - Guitar
- Aiert Erkoreka - Keyboards
