= Yo, Minoría Absoluta =

Studio album by Extremoduro
- Released: 5 March 2002
- Recorded: October 2001 – January 2002
- Genres: Hard rock; heavy metal
- Length: 42:51
- Language: Spanish
- Label: DRO
- Producer: Iñaki "Uoho" Antón

Extremoduro chronology
Canciones Prohibidas (1998)	Yo, Minoría Absoluta (2002)	Grandes Éxitos y Fracasos (2004)

Yo, minoría absoluta is the eighth studio album by Spanish hard rock band Extremoduro. It was produced by Iñaki "Uoho" Antón and published by DRO on 5 March 2002.

== Track listing ==
Lyrics by Roberto Iniesta, music by Roberto Iniesta and Iñaki Antón.

No.	Title	Length
1.	"A fuego"	5:26
2.	"La vereda de la puerta de atrás"	4:03
3.	"Hoy te la meto hasta las orejas"	3:43
4.	"Standby"	3:28
5.	"Menamoro"	3:08
6.	"Luce la oscuridad"	3:51
7.	"Cerca del suelo"	4:42
8.	"Puta"	5:38
9.	"Buitre no come alpiste"	4:18
10.	"La vieja (canción sórdida)"	4:42

Limited edition bonus live DVD
No.	Title	Length
1.	"Papel secante"	4:23
2.	"Buscando una luna"	4:05
3.	"Jesucristo García"	5:14
4.	"De acero"	4:39
5.	"Sol de invierno"	5:16
6.	"Puta [music video]"	5:40
7.	"A fuego [music video]"	5:05

== Personnel ==
Extremoduro

- Roberto "Robe" Iniesta – Vocals and guitar
- Iñaki "Uoho" Antón – Guitar
- Miguel Colino – Bass
- José Ignacio Cantera – Drums

Additional musicians

- Fito Cabrales – Backing vocals
- Sara – Backing vocals
- Gino Pavone –Percussion instrument
- Batiz – Slide guitar
- Javi Isasi – Trumpet
- Lourdes Aldekoa – Backing vocals on "Hoy te la meto..."

== Charts and certifications ==
=== Chart performance ===
Chart (2002)	Peak position
Spanish Album Charts	4

=== Certifications ===
Region	Certification	Certified units/sales
Spain (Promusicae)	Platinum	100,000^{^}
^{^} Shipments figures based on certification alone.
