= 7 (Platero y Tú album) =

Studio album by Platero y Tú
- Released: 29 September 1997
- Recorded: 1997
- Genre: Rock and roll, hard rock
- Length: 38:40
- Language: Spanish
- Label: Warner Music
- Producer: Platero y Tú

Platero y Tú chronology
A Pelo (1996)	7 (1997)	Correos (2000)

Singles from 7
- 1. "Por mí" 2. "Al cantar" 3. "Si miro a las nubes" 4. "Alucinante"

7 is the sixth studio album by Spanish rock band Platero y Tú. It was produced by Platero y Tú, recorded in 1997 and published by DRO on 29 September 1997.

== Track listing ==
No.	Title	Writer(s)	Length
1.	"Por mi"	Iñaki Antón / Fito Cabrales	5:34
2.	"Si miro a las nubes (feat. Roberto Iniesta)"	Iñaki Antón / Fito Cabrales	5:34
3.	"Rock'n'Roll"	Fito / Iñaki / Juantxu / Jesús	4:08
4.	"Magia"	Iñaki Antón / Fito Cabrales	4:16
5.	"Mujer"	Iñaki Antón / Fito Cabrales	3:33
6.	"Alucinante"	Iñaki Antón / Fito Cabrales	3:09
7.	"Mendrugos"	Iñaki Antón / Fito Cabrales	3:07
8.	"Al cantar"	Iñaki Antón / Fito Cabrales	4:47
9.	"Que larga es la noche"	Fito / Iñaki / Juantxu / Jesús	4:55

== Personnel ==
- Fito Cabrales: Vocals and guitar.
- Iñaki "Uoho" Antón: Guitar.
- Juantxu Olano: Bass.
- Jesús García: Drums.

== Certifications ==
Region	Certification	Certified units/sales
Spain (PROMUSICAE)	Gold	50,000^{^}
^{^} Shipments figures based on certification alone.
