= ¿Dónde Están Mis Amigos? =

Studio album by Extremoduro
- Released: 17 September 1993
- Recorded: 1993, Estudios Box, Madrid
- Genre: Hard rock
- Length: 37:29
- Label: DRO
- Producer: Ventura Rico

Extremoduro chronology
Deltoya (1992)	¿Dónde Están Mis Amigos? (1993)	Pedrá (1995)

¿Dónde Están Mis Amigos? is the fourth studio album by Spanish hard rock band Extremoduro. It was produced by Ventura Rico, recorded and published by Dro Records in 1993. The album was recorded in autumn 1993 and was published later that year. While all his works hitherto had been self-produced, this is the first record for which they hired a professional producer: Ventura Rico. This LP is considered the most personal and intimate of the band.

== Track listing ==
All songs written by Roberto Iniesta.

No.	Title	Length
1.	"El duende del parque"	4:20
2.	"No me calientes que me hundo"	2:52
3.	"Sin Dios ni amo"	3:50
4.	"Pepe Botika (¿Dónde están mis amigos?) (feat. Fernando Madina from Reincidentes)"	4:15
5.	"Estoy muy bien"	3:31
6.	"Bri, bri, bli, bli (En el más sucio rincón de mi negro corazón)"	3:16
7.	"Malos pensamientos"	3:13
8.	"Posado en un nenúfar"	2:22
9.	"Islero, shirlero o ladrón"	4:19
10.	"Historias prohibidas (Nos tiramos a joder)"	2:28
11.	"Los tengo todos"	2:55

2011 edition bonus tracks

No.	Title	Length
13.	"No me calientes que me hundo (Versión 2004)"	2:52
14.	"Pepe Botika (Versión 2004)"	3:57
15.	"El duende del parque (Versión 2004)"	4:16
16.	"Bri bri bli bli (Versión 2004)"	3:19
17.	"Historias prohibidas (Versión 2004)"	2:23

== Personnel ==
Extremoduro

- Robe Iniesta – Vocals, backing vocals, guitar, flute and reed
- Eugenio Ortiz "UGE" – Guitar
- Jorge "el Moja" – Drums
- Miguel Ferreras – Bass
- Ramón "Mon" Sogas – Bass

Additional personnel

- Belén – Vocals on No me calientes que me hundo, Pepe Botika, Estoy muy bien, Bribriblibli
- Fernando Madina – Vocals on No me calientes que me hundo, Pepe Botika, Bribriblibli and Malos pensamientos
- Aitor Bengoa – Vocals on No me calientes que me hundo
- Selu – Saxophone and reed
- Iñaki "Uoho" Antón – Guitar on Los tengo todos

== Certifications ==
Region	Certification	Certified units/sales
Spain (PROMUSICAE)	Platinum	100,000^{^}
^{^} Shipments figures based on certification alone.
