= Pedrá =

Studio album by Extremoduro
- Released: 17 February 1995
- Recorded: August 1993, Lorentzo Records
- Genre: Hard rock Progressive rock Punk rock
- Length: 29:28
- Language: Spanish
- Label: DRO
- Producer: Raúl and Biri

Extremoduro chronology
¿Dónde Están Mis Amigos? (1993)	Pedrá (1995)	Agila (1996)

Pedrá (Spanish: Rock Strike) is an album by musicians from different bands, signed as Extremoduro. It contains just one song. At first, it would be the first album of the "Pedrá" project. However, just one label, DRO, accepted to release, but the group name should be "Extremoduro". Its lyrics contains around 180 verses, of which four are in Catalan.

== Track listing ==
No.	Title	Writer(s)	Length
1.	"Pedrá"	Roberto Iniesta	29:28

== Personnel ==
Pedrá

- Roberto Iniesta "Robe" (from Extremoduro) - vocals, Guitars
- José Luis Nieto "Selu" (from Reincidentes) - Sax
- Joserra "Gary" Garitaonandia (from Quattro Clavos) - drums
- Iñaki "Uoho" Antón (from Platero y Tú) - Guitars, Keys
- Diego Garay 'Dieguillo' (from Quemando Ruedas)- Bass

Additional personnel

- Fito Cabrales (from Platero y Tú) - Guitar
- Ramone (from Capitán Kavernícola) - Vocals

== Charts ==
Chart performance for Pedrá
Chart (2025)	Peak position
Spanish Albums (PROMUSICAE)	13

== Certifications ==
Region	Certification	Certified units/sales
Spain (PROMUSICAE)	Platinum	100,000^{^}
^{^} Shipments figures based on certification alone.
