= Ara Malikian =

Ara Malikian Արա Մալիքեան
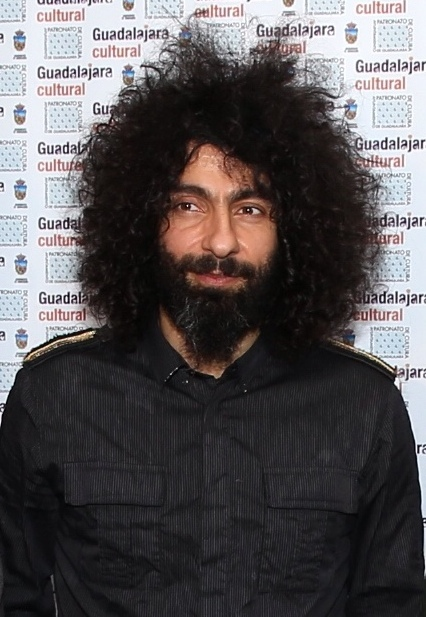
- Malikian at the Teatro Moderno de Guadalajara, 2015

Background information
- Born: Ara Malikian; September 14, 1968 (age 58); Beirut, Lebanon
- Origin: Armenian born in Lebanon
- Occupations: Violinist; musician
- Instrument: Violin
- Labels: Picos & Ham Records
- Website: www.aramalikian.com

Ara Malikian (Western Armenian: Արա Մալիքեան; born 1968) is a Lebanese-born violinist of Armenian descent. He was educated in Germany and was later based in Spain. He has a wide repertoire and includes music from many cultures. He has played in over 40 countries and has won numerous prizes in international competitions. Malikian has recorded nearly 30 albums over a period of 25 years.

== Biography ==
Malikian was born on September 14, 1968 in Beirut, Lebanon, to an Armenian family. His father was a violinist. He started playing the violin at a young age, encouraged by his father, who had performed with established Lebanese singer Fairuz, and Ara gave his first concert at the age of 12.

He has also performed solo violin recitals, with programs featuring complete cycles of the "24 Caprices" of Paganini, the "Six Sonatas" of Eugène Ysaÿe, and the "Sonatas and Partitas" of J.S. Bach.

Malikian was the concertmaster of the Orquesta Sinfónica de Madrid (resident orchestra of the Madrid Royal Opera). He played in Le Boeuf sur le Toit by D. Milhaud, in the version for violin and orchestra, under the direction of Gómez Martínez; and in the "Concerto for Violín and Orchestra in D minor" by Aram Khachaturian under the baton of Jesús López-Cobos.

Since 1995, Malikian has performed as a duo, with the Armenian pianist Serouj Kradjian. They recorded the complete cycle of Sonatas by Robert Schumann (Hänsler), as well as the record "Miniatures" (Malkrafon), an anthology of music for violin and piano, written by Armenian composers. Malikian has also recorded numerous albums for record companies such as BMG, Auvidis, Trittico Classics and Elite Music, including "The Four Seasons" of Vivaldi, of which more than 80,000 copies were sold for UNICEF.

Malikian has maintained a close collaboration with José Luis Montón, Lebanese singer Fairuz, flamenco dancers Joaquín Cortés and Belén Maya, the Ensamble Nuevo Tango and jazz pianist Horacio Icasto. He has also worked with film-music composers such as Alberto Iglesias, with whom he recorded the soundtrack for Hable Con Ella, a movie by Almodóvar, or Pascal Gainge in Otro Barrio by the director Salvador García Ruiz.

Malikian has released two albums, "Manantial" and "De la felicidad", accompanied by flamenco guitarist José Luis Montón. De la felicidad was nominated by the Spanish Academy of Music for best New Music CD of the year. Malikian recorded a double CD of Paganini for Warner Bros. including his "24 Caprices for Violin Solo"; an album of compositions by Sarasate, accompanied by Armenian pianist Serouj Kradjian; the "Six Sonatas" for violin by Ysaÿe; and the "Sonatas and Partitas" by J. S. Bach.

Malikian has been nominated twice for best classical performance in the 2007 Music Prizes in Spain by the Spanish Academy for his recording of the Poema Concertante by Xavier Montsalvatge with the Castilla y León Symphonic Orchestra; as well as for a piece with Joan Valent, Suso Sáiz and Marc Blanes.

He participated as a guest artist in the film J: Beyond Flamenco, by Carlos Saura (2016).

== Personal life ==
Malikian married Natalia Moreno in 2018. They live in Madrid, and have one child, Kairo.

== Discography ==
=== Albums ===
- 1995: Le quattro stagioni
- 1996: 750 Jahre Wölpinghausen
- 1996: Miniatures
- 1997: Bow on the String
- 1999: 500 motivaciones
- 2000: All Seasons for Different
- 2000: Robert Schumann
- 2002/2004: Manantial
- 2003: 24 Caprices for Solo Violin by Paganini
- 2003: Sarasate
- 2003: Six Sonatas for Solo Violin by Ysaÿe
- 2003: Sonatas and Partitas for Solo Violin by Bach
- 2004: El arte del violín
- 2004: The Four Seasons by Vivaldi
- 2005: De la felicidad
- 2005: De los Cobos / Montsalvatge
- 2006: Tears of Beauty
- 2007: Meeting with a friend
- 2007: Lejos
- 2010: Conciertos románticos españoles de violín (Orquesta sinfónica de Castilla & León-Alejandro Posada & Ara Malikian)
- 2011: Con los ojos cerrados (Ara Malikian & Fernando Egozcue Quinteto)
- 2011: Christmas mood
- 2013: Pizzicato
- 2015: 15
- 2016: The Incredible Story of Violin
- 2017: Symphonic at Las Ventas (Live)
- 2019: Royal garage

As guest artist

- 2006: Insula poética En Son Brull
- 2008: La ley innata Extremoduro
- 2011: Material defectuoso Extremoduro
- 2011: Krasivuye glazha Huecco
- 2013: Para todos los públicos Extremoduro
- 2019: Ira Dei Mägo de Oz

=== Soundtracks ===
- 1999: Manolito Gafotas – Directed by Miguel Albaladejo
- 2000: El otro barrio – Directed by Salvador García Ruiz
- 2001: Los pasos perdidos – Directed by Manane Rodríguez
- 2002: Hable con ella⁣ – Directed by Pedro Almodóvar
- 2005: La mala educación – Directed by Pedro Almodóvar
- 2006: Ecos – Directed by Estefanía Muñiz
- 2010: Pájaros de papel – Directed by Emilio Aragón
- 2016: J: Beyond Flamenco – Directed by Carlos Saura
- 2016: The Promise – Directed by Terry George
