= Extrechinato y Tú =

Musical project by Robe Iniesta, Iñaki Antón and Fito Cabrales

- Genres: Hard rock, symphonic rock, poetry
- Years active: 1996–2001
- Labels: DRO
- Members: Manolo Chinato; Robe Iniesta; Iñaki "Uoho" Antón; Fito Cabrales

Extrechinato y Tú (Spanish pronunciation: [e(ɣ)stɾetʃiˈnato j ˈtu]) was a musical project by Robe Iniesta (Extremoduro), Iñaki "Uoho" Antón (Platero y Tú and Extremoduro) and Fito Cabrales (Platero y Tú and Fito & Fitipaldis). It is a tribute to the poet Manolo Chinato. The unique album of this supergroup, Poesía básica, puts music to the poems by Manolo Chinato so most of the lyrics are verses made by him.

== Members ==
- Manolo Chinato – Lyrics and vocals
- Roberto Iniesta, "Robe" (Extremoduro) – Guitar and vocals
- Fito Cabrales (Platero y Tú, Fito & Fitipaldis) – Guitar, vocals and lyrics
- Iñaki "Uoho" Antón (Platero y Tú, Extremoduro, Inconscientes) – Guitar, bass and keyboards

=== Extra staff ===
- José Ignacio Cantera (Extremoduro, Inconscientes) – Drums
- Jesús García "Maguila" (Platero y Tú, La Gripe) – Drums
- Ricardo Cantera – Drums
- Javier Alzola (Fito & Fitipaldis) – Saxophone, clarinet, flute and piccolo
- Gino Pavone (Fito & Fitipaldis) – Percussion
- José Alberto Bátiz (Fito & Fitipaldis) – Slide guitar

== Poesía básica ==
Poesía Básica

Studio album by Extrechinato y Tú
- Released: 27 April 2001
- Recorded: Lorentzo Records, June 1999 – March 2001
- Genre: Hard rock, Symphonic rock, poetry
- Label: DRO
- Producer: Iñaki Antón

Singles from Poesía Básica
- 1. "A la sombra de mi sombra" 2. "Juguete de amor"

No.	Title	Length
1.	"A la sombra de mi sombra"	5:12
2.	"Juguete de amor"	4:30
3.	"Viento (déjame ir contigo)"	3:31
4.	"Abrazado a la tristeza"	5:39
5.	"Eterno viajero"	4:38
6.	"Tres puertas"	4:03
7.	"Si el cielo está gris"	3:04
8.	"Sueños"	4:05
9.	"Rojitas las Orejas"	3:52
10.	"Manolillo Chinato"	1:50

=== Chart performance ===
Chart (2001)	Peak position
Spanish Album Charts	7
