= Material Defectuoso =

Studio album by Extremoduro
- Released: 24 May 2011
- Genre: Art rock, progressive rock, hard rock
- Language: Spanish
- Label: Warner Music
- Producer: Iñaki "Uoho" Antón

Extremoduro chronology
La Ley Innata (2008)	Material Defectuoso (2011)	Para Todos los Públicos (2013)

Singles from Material Defectuoso
- 1. "Tango Suicida" Released: 17 May 2011

Material Defectuoso (Spanish: Flawed product) is the tenth studio album by Spanish hard rock band Extremoduro. It was produced by Iñaki "Uoho" Antón, and released on 24 May 2011. The first single "Tango Suicida" was released on 17 May 2011.

== Track listing ==
No.	Title	Length
1.	"Desarraigo"	7:37
2.	"Mi espíritu imperecedero"	5:42
3.	"Otra inútil canción para la paz"	6:11
4.	"Si te vas"	8:36
5.	"Tango suicida"	8:07
6.	"Calle esperanza s/n"	7:06

== Personnel ==
Extremoduro

- Roberto "Robe" Iniesta – vocals, guitars, chorus on #01, 03, 06
- Iñaki "Uoho" Antón – guitars, chorus, bass on #03, 04; organ on #01, 04, 05, 06; trombon on #03; piano on #04
- Miguel Colino – bass on #01, 02, 05, 06; vocals on #05
- José Ignacio Cantera – drums; vocals on #05

Additional musicians

- María "Cebolleta" Martín – chorus
- Gino Pavone – percussion on #01, 02, 04, 05, 06
- Javier Mora – clavinet on #01; organ on #03, 05; piano on #05
- Mikel Piris – saxophone on #03, 05; flutes on #06
- Ara Malikian – violin on #04, 06
- Mario Pérez – violin on #04, 06
- Humberto Armas – viola on #04, 06
- Juan Pérez de Albéniz – contrabass on #04, 06

== Charts ==
=== Weekly charts ===
Weekly chart performance for Material Defectuoso
Chart (2011)	Peak position
Spanish Albums (PROMUSICAE)	1

=== Year-end charts ===
Year-end chart performance for Material Defectuoso
Chart (2011)	Position
Spanish Albums (PROMUSICAE)	15

== Certifications ==
Region	Certification	Certified units/sales
Spain (PROMUSICAE)	Platinum	60,000^{^}
^{^} Shipments figures based on certification alone.

== Reception ==
Professional ratings
Review scores
Source	Rating
Allmusic	3/5 stars
Rolling Stone	4.5/5 stars

Material defectuoso has received generally positive reviews. Rolling Stone Spain claimed that the album was excellent and innovative. However, Allmusic complained that it was good but too relaxed.

== Notes ==
=== External links ===
- Extremoduro official website (in Spanish)
