= Grandes Éxitos y Fracasos =

Grandes éxitos y fracasos is a compilation series by Spanish hard rock band Extremoduro. It features re-recorded versions of the band's early hits, as well as some newer album tracks.

Later, it was released a Box set that included both compilation albums, the DVD Gira 2002 and an instrumental compilation album called Canciones sin voz.

== Grandes éxitos y fracasos (Episodio primero) ==
Grandes Éxitos y Fracasos (Episodio Primero)

Compilation album (re-recorded) by Extremoduro
- Released: 3 May 2004
- Recorded: 2000–2004
- Genre: Hard rock
- Length: 62:12
- Label: DRO
- Producer: Iñaki Antón

Extremoduro chronology
Yo, Minoría Absoluta (2002)	Grandes Éxitos y Fracasos (Episodio Primero) (2004)	Grandes Éxitos y Fracasos (Episodio Segundo) (2004)

No.	Title	Length
1.	"No me calientes que me hundo"
2.	"Jesucristo García"
3.	"Pepe Botika (¿Dónde están mis amigos?)"
4.	"Necesito droga y amor (Los camellos no me fían)"
5.	"Extremaydura [misprinted as "Tu corazón"]"
6.	"Tu corazón [misprinted as "Extremaydura"]"
7.	"La canción de los oficios"
8.	"Sucede"
9.	"Sol de invierno"
10.	"El día de la bestia"
11.	"Golfa"
12.	"La vereda de la puerta de atrás"
13.	"So payaso"
14.	"A fuego"
15.	"Ama, ama, ama y ensancha el alma"

=== Chart performance ===
Chart (2004)	Peak position
Spanish Album Charts	3

=== Certifications ===
Region	Certification	Certified units/sales
Spain (PROMUSICAE)	Gold	50,000^{^}
^{^} Shipments figures based on certification alone.

== Grandes éxitos y fracasos (Episodio segundo) ==
Grandes Éxitos y Fracasos (Episodio Segundo)

Compilation album (re-recorded) by Extremoduro
- Released: 15 November 2004
- Recorded: 2000–2004
- Genre: Hard rock
- Length: 72:28
- Label: DRO
- Producer: Iñaki Antón

Extremoduro chronology
Grandes Éxitos y Fracasos (Episodio Primero) (2004)	Grandes Éxitos y Fracasos (Episodio Segundo) (2004)	La Ley Innata (2008)

No.	Title	Length
1.	"Papel secante"
2.	"Amor castúo"
3.	"Decidí"
4.	"Quemando tus recuerdos"
5.	"El duende del parque"
6.	"Deltoya"
7.	"Bribribliblí"
8.	"Bulerías de la sangre caliente"
9.	"De acero"
10.	"Historias prohibidas"
11.	"Estado policial"
12.	"Arrebato"
13.	"Salir"
14.	"Volando solo"
15.	"Buscando una luna"
16.	"Prometeo"
17.	"Puta"
18.	"Standby"

=== Chart performance ===
Chart (2004)	Peak position
Spanish Album Charts	23

== Box Set ==
Grandes Éxitos y Fracasos

Box set by Extremoduro
- Released: 15 November 2004
- Recorded: 2000–2004
- Genre: Hard rock
- Label: DRO
- Producer: Iñaki Antón

Extremoduro chronology
Grandes Éxitos y Fracasos (2004)	20 Años. Discografía Completa (2010)

The box set contains the two episodes, the DVD performance of the 2002 Tour and an instrumental compilation album called Canciones sin voz.

== Canciones sin voz ==
Canciones sin Voz

Compilation album by Extremoduro
- Released: 15 November 2004
- Recorded: 2000–2004
- Genre: Hard rock
- Label: DRO
- Producer: Iñaki Antón

Extremoduro chronology
Grandes Éxitos y Fracasos (Episodio Segundo) (2004)	Canciones sin Voz (2004)	La Ley Innata (2008)

Canciones sin voz is an instrumental compilation album only included in Grandes éxitos y fracasos Box Set.

=== Track listing ===
1. Presentación
2. No me calientes, que me hundo
3. Jesucristo García
4. Pepe Botika
5. Necesito droga y amor
6. Tu corazón
7. Sol de invierno
8. La vereda de la puerta de atrás
9. A fuego
10. Ama, ama, ama y ensancha el alma
11. Papel secante
12. Amor castúo
13. Decidí
14. Quemando tus recuerdos
15. Bribribliblí
16. De acero
17. Historias prohibidas
18. Salir
19. Puta
20. Standby
