= Estefanía Muñiz =

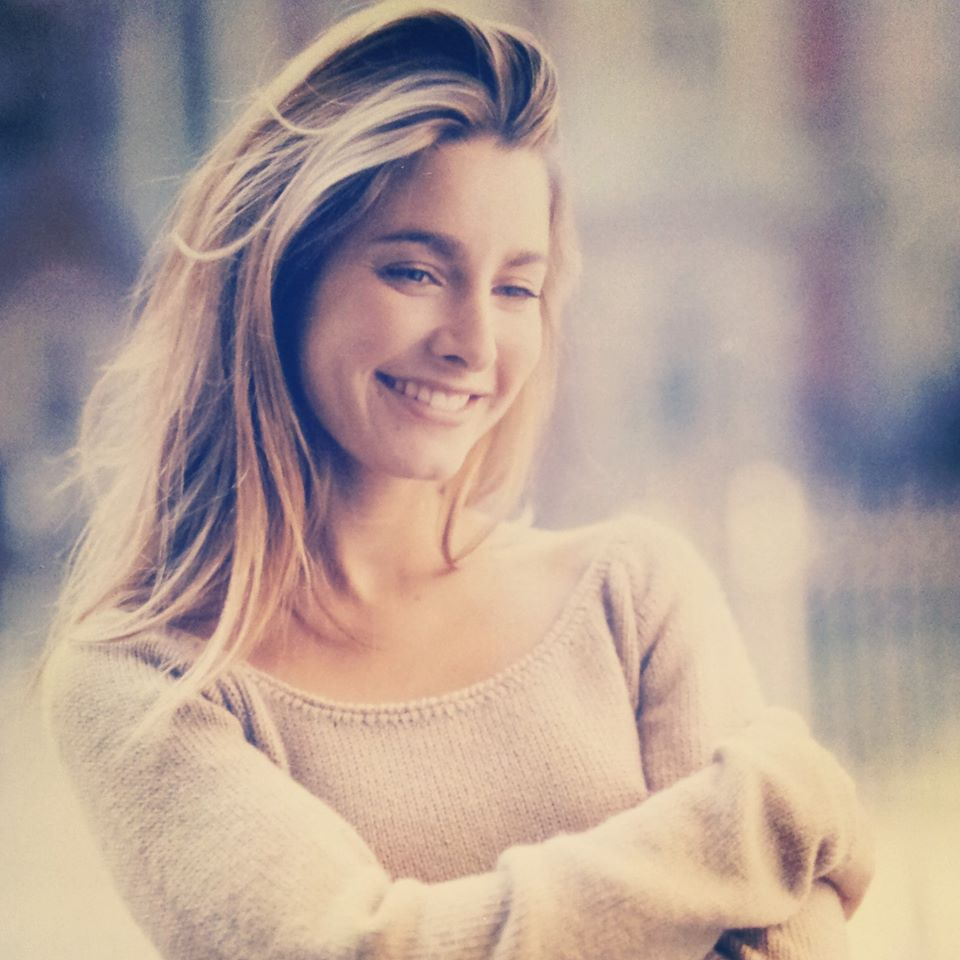
- Festival de Cine de Alcalá de Henares 2003.
- Born: 8 January 1974 (age 52); León, Spain, Castilla y León, Spain
- Occupations: Director, Scriptwriter, critic.
- Years active: 2003–present
- Website: www.estefaniamuniz.com

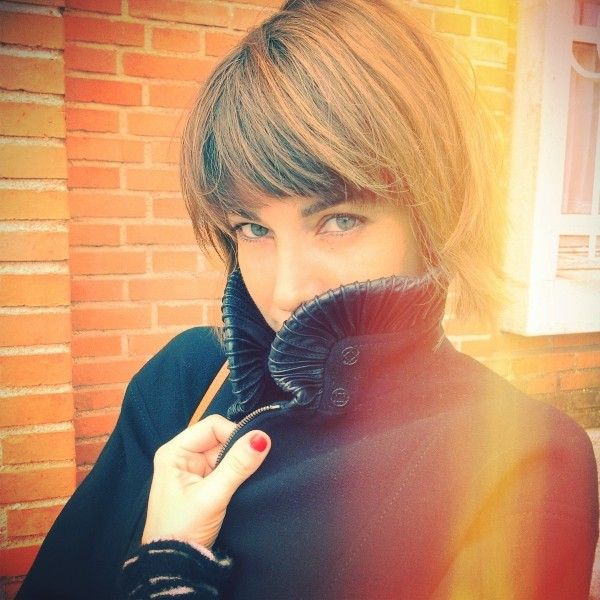
Estefanía Muñiz Villa (2014).

Estefanía Muñiz Villa (León, 8 January 1974) is a Spanish film director, scriptwriter, critic, and author of two poetry books.

== Career ==
=== Film ===
Estefanía is an attorney at law who practiced for over five years before finally dedicating herself exclusively to film making. She studied drama at Escuela de Actores (Acting School) with Daniel Cicaré and took various scriptwriting courses at Estudio Internacional with Juan Carlos Corazza and at Escuela de Guión (Scriptwriting School) with Alicia Luna. Her first release was Construir (2003), a short film codirected with Ana Prieto Gracia starring Carmelo Gómez. Construir was awarded the first prize at The Torino Film Festival and was broadcast on the Swedish and Norwegian television for a long period of time. She then directed two other short films. The first one. No me quieras tanto (2003), was awarded Best Video Creation at the Alcalá de Henares Film Festival, and the second prize at the Jerez Short Film Festival, Best Gender Equality Short Film at the Villareal Film Festival, and the Jury Prize at the Valladolid La Fila Film Festival, among others.

Recognition outside Europe came with her third short film Ecos (2006), starring Mercè Llorens and the Armenian origin violinist Ara Malikian, who also composed the film’s music. Ecos received the first prize at the New York International Independent Film and Video Festival, Best Short Film at the Lago Film Festival of Treviso, Italy, and Best soundtrack at the Sant Sadurní Film Festival. After gaining experience as a short film maker, Estefanía Muñiz wrote the script to her first feature film Vértice, funded by Comunidad de Madrid, which awarded and published the project in 2008. In 2014 she signed up a contract with various American production companies. The independent Light Age Films entrusted her with the creation of a script for a feature film that will be released in 2015. She works as a film critic for the digital version of the leisure magazine Guía del Ocio.

=== Poetry ===
She published two poetry books. Her first book, Corazón ombligo (Sistemas Editoriales, 2004) was illustrated by painter and sculptor from León, José Ramón Villa. Her second book of poems, Versos bipolares y otras criaturas luminiscentes (Ediciones Atlantis, 2009) whose prologue was written by Spanish singer and composer Joaquín Sabina. She took part in two poem anthologies published by Ediciones Atlantis: Tic-tac (2006) y Golpe a la corrupción (2013).
