= Canciones Prohibidas =

1998 album by Extremoduro

Studio album by Extremoduro
- Released: 28 September 1998
- Recorded: June–September 1998, Lorentzo Records
- Genre: Hard rock
- Length: 44:57
- Language: Spanish
- Label: DRO
- Producer: Iñaki "Uoho" Antón

Extremoduro chronology
Iros todos a tomar por culo (1997)	Canciones Prohibidas (1998)	Yo, Minoría Absoluta (2002)

Canciones Prohibidas is the seventh studio album by Spanish hard rock band Extremoduro. It was produced by Iñaki "Uoho" Antón, recorded and published by DRO on 28 September 1998.

== Track listing ==
Lyrics by Roberto Iniesta, music by Roberto Iniesta and Iñaki Antón.

No.	Title	Length
1.	"Salir"	5:18
2.	"Esclarecido"	6:23
3.	"Érase una vez"	4:35
4.	"Golfa"	5:59
5.	"Su culo es miel"	5:58
6.	"Extraterrestre"	3:28
7.	"Autorretrato"	7:23
8.	"Enemigo"	2:38
9.	"Villancico del rey de Extremadura"	3:01

2011 edition tracklist
No.	Title	Length
1.	"Salir"	5:20
2.	"Golfa"	6:00
3.	"Su culo es miel"	6:00
4.	"Autorretrato"	7:24
5.	"Enemigo"	2:40
6.	"Villancico del rey de Extremadura"	3:02
7.	"Esclarecido"	6:24
8.	"Érase una vez"	4:36
9.	"Extraterrestre"	3:30
10.	"Salir (nueva mezcla 2004)"	5:18

== Personnel ==
Extremoduro

- Roberto "Robe" Iniesta – Vocals, guitar, fuzz bass, tambourine...
- Iñaki "Uoho" Antón – Guitar, bass, piano, organ, trombone, percussion instrument, backing vocals...
- José Ignacio Cantera – Drums

Additional personnel

- Mikel Irazoki – Bass
- Arkadiusz Tomasz Czyzewski – Violin
- Iwona Przyzecka – Violin
- Iwona Skrzypczak – Viola
- Jurek Andrzejczak – Cello
- Carlos "Alma" Almaguer Torres – Percussion instrument
- Joseba Molina "Canario" – Bandurria and laúd
- Garikoitz Badiola "Gari" – Trombone
- Patxi Urtxegi – Trumpet and flugelhorn

== Charts and certifications ==
=== Chart performance ===
Chart (1998)	Peak position
Spanish Album Charts	4

=== Certifications ===
Region	Certification	Certified units/sales
Spain (PROMUSICAE)	Platinum	100,000^{^}
^{^} Shipments figures based on certification alone.
