= Voy a Acabar Borracho =

Studio album by Platero y Tú
- Released: June 1991
- Recorded: 22–24 February 1991
- Genre: Rock and roll, hard rock
- Length: 41:20
- Label: Wellcome Records / DRO
- Producer: Platero y Tú

Platero y Tú chronology
Burrock'n Roll (1990)	Voy a Acabar Borracho (1991)	Muy Deficiente (1992)

Voy a Acabar Borracho is the mainstream debut album by Spanish rock band Platero y Tú. It was produced by Platero y Tú, recorded from 22 to 24 February 1991 and published by Wellcome Records in June 1991. On 26 August 1996, DRO republished the album.

The outro of the song "Si tú te vas" is taken from Status Quo's version of the song Rockin' All Over the World.

== Track listing ==
Side one
No.	Title	Writer(s)	Length
1.	"Voy a acabar borracho"	Iñaki Antón / Fito Cabrales	4:54
2.	"Tiemblan los corazones"	Iñaki Antón / Fito Cabrales	2:45
3.	"Un abecedario sin letras"	Fito Cabrales	2:59
4.	"Por detrás"	Iñaki Antón / Fito Cabrales	3:13
5.	"Si tú te vas"	Fito / Iñaki / Juantxu / Jesús	4:17
6.	"Mira hacia mi"	Iñaki Antón	3:44

Side two
No.	Title	Writer(s)	Length
7.	"No me quieres saludar"	Juantxu	2:55
8.	"La maté porque era mía"	Iñaki / Fito	2:38
9.	"Ya no existe la vida"	Iñaki Antón / Fito Cabrales	2:36
10.	"Déjame en paz"	Iñaki / Fito	4:10
11.	"Ramón"	Iñaki / Fito	5:16
12.	"Imanol"	Iñaki / Fito	2:14

== Personnel ==
- Fito Cabrales: Vocals and guitar
- Iñaki "Uoho" Antón: Guitar
- Juantxu Olano: Bass
- Jesús García: Drums
