= A Pelo =

Live album by Platero y Tú
- Released: May 1996
- Genre: Rock and roll, hard rock
- Length: 70:13 / 29:57
- Label: DRO
- Producer: Platero y Tú

Platero y Tú chronology
| Hay Poco Rock & Roll (1994) | A Pelo (1996) | 7 (1997) |

Singles from A Pelo
- 1. "Voy a acabar borracho" 2. "El roce de tu cuerpo"

A Pelo is a live studio album by Spanish rock band Platero y Tú. It was produced by Platero y Tú and published by DRO in 1996.

== Track listing ==
=== CD1 ===
| No. | Title | Writer(s) | Length |
|---|---|---|---|
| 1. | "A un tipo listo" | Fito / Iñaki / Jesús | 5:59 |
| 2. | "Un ABC sin letras" | Fito | 2:58 |
| 3. | "Ramón" | Fito / Iñaki | 5:29 |
| 4. | "Bobo" | Fito / Iñaki | 3:13 |
| 5. | "Tras la barra" | Fito / Iñaki | 3:02 |
| 6. | "Por fin..." | Fito / Iñaki | 3:36 |
| 7. | "Voy a acabar borracho" | Iñaki / Fito | 6:02 |
| 8. | "Juliette" | Iñaki / Fito | 4:02 |
| 9. | "Esa chica tan cara" | Iñaki / Fito | 5:11 |
| 10. | "Me dan miedo las noches" | Juantxu / Jesús / Iñaki / Fito | 5:11 |
| 11. | "Ya no existe la vida" | Iñaki / Fito | 3:06 |
| 12. | "Mira hacia mi" | Iñaki / Fito | 5:10 |
| 13. | "Hay poco Rock & Roll" | Iñaki / Fito | 6:54 |
| 14. | "Si tú te vas" | Iñaki / Fito | 10:46 |

=== CD2 ===
| No. | Title | Writer(s) | Length |
|---|---|---|---|
| 1. | "Mari Madalenas" | Fito / Iñaki | 3:48 |
| 2. | "El roce de tu cuerpo" | Juantxu / Jesús / Iñaki / Fito | 4:20 |
| 3. | "Desertor" | Fito / Iñaki | 6:03 |
| 4. | "Marabao" | Fito / Iñaki | 4:09 |
| 5. | "Tenemos que entrar" | Fito / Iñaki | 5:26 |
| 6. | "Bobo (Madrid)" | Fito / Iñaki | 3:39 |
| 7. | "Muero por vivir (Previously unreleased studio track)" | Juantxu / Jesús / Iñaki / Fito | 3:01 |

== Personnel ==
- Fito Cabrales: vocals and guitar
- Iñaki "Uoho" Antón: guitar
- Juantxu Olano: bass
- Jesús García: drums

== Certifications ==
| Region | Certification | Certified units/sales |
|---|---|---|
| Spain (PROMUSICAE) | Gold | 50,000^{^} |
^{^} Shipments figures based on certification alone.
