= Correos (album) =

Studio album by Platero y Tú
- Released: 2 October 2000
- Recorded: 2000
- Genre: Rock and roll, hard rock
- Length: 42:12
- Label: Warner Music
- Producer: Platero y Tú

Platero y Tú chronology
7 (1997)	Correos (2000)	Hay Mucho Rock'n'Roll Vol 1 (2002)

Singles from Correos
- 1. "Naufragio"; 2. "Entre dos mares" 3. "Un ticket para cualquier lugar"

Professional ratings
Review scores
Source	Rating
Kerrang!	4/5 stars
Heavy Rock	6/6 stars

Correos is the seventh studio album by Spanish rock band Platero y Tú. It was produced by Platero y Tú, recorded in 2000 and published by DRO on 2 October 2000.

== Track listing ==
No.	Title	Writer(s)	Length
1.	"Cigarrito"	Iñaki Antón / Fito Cabrales	3:58
2.	"Un ticket para cualquier lugar"	Edorta Arostegui	4:45
3.	"Entre dos mares"	Fito / Iñaki / Juantxu	4:13
4.	"Caminar cuesta arriba"	Edorta Arostegui	3:57
5.	"Naufragio"	Iñaki Antón / Fito Cabrales	3:59
6.	"Entrando cruzado"	Iñaki Antón / Fito Cabrales	4:04
7.	"Salvaje"	Iñaki Antón / Fito Cabrales	2:30
8.	"Humo de mis pies"	Iñaki Antón / Fito Cabrales	3:28
9.	"Me da igual"	Iñaki Antón / Fito Cabrales	4:02
10.	"¿Qué demonios?"	Iñaki Antón / Fito Cabrales	5:01
11.	"Pero al ponerse el sol (bonus track)"	Los Bravos	2:38

== Personnel ==
- Fito Cabrales: Vocals and guitar.
- Iñaki "Uoho" Antón: Guitar.
- Juantxu Olano: Bass.
- Jesús García: Drums.

== Certifications ==
Region	Certification	Certified units/sales
Spain (PROMUSICAE)	Gold	50,000^{^}
^{^} Shipments figures based on certification alone.
