= Muy Deficiente =

Studio album by Platero y Tú
- Released: 12 June 1992
- Genre: Rock and roll, hard rock, blues rock
- Length: 40:44
- Label: DRO
- Producer: Platero y Tú

Platero y Tú chronology
Voy a Acabar Borracho (1991)	Muy Deficiente (1992)	Vamos Tirando (1993)

Singles from Muy deficiente
- 1. "Rompe los cristales" 2. "El roce de tu cuerpo" 3. "Esa chica tan cara"

Muy Deficiente is the third studio album by Spanish rock band Platero y Tú. It was produced by Platero y Tú and published by DRO on 12 June 1992.

== Track listing ==
No.	Title	Writer(s)	Length
1.	"El roce de tu cuerpo"	Fito / Iñaki / Juantxu	4:12
2.	"Rompe los cristales"	Fito / Iñaki	3:41
3.	"Esa chica tan cara"	Fito / Iñaki	4:24
4.	"Estás solo"	Fito / Iñaki	3:12
5.	"Sin solución (feat. Rosendo)"	Fito / Iñaki	6:28
6.	"No hierve tu sangre"	Iñaki Antón / Fito Cabrales	3:15
7.	"Contaminamos"	Anonymous	3:17
8.	"Meando en la pared"	Fito Cabrales / Iñaki Antón	2:19
9.	"Desertor"	Fito Cabrales / Iñaki Antón	5:17
10.	"Cantalojas"	Fito Cabrales / Iñaki Antón	5:59

== Personnel ==
- Fito Cabrales: Vocals and guitar.
- Iñaki "Uoho" Antón: Guitar.
- Juantxu Olano: Bass.
- Jesús García: Drums.
