= La Ley Innata =

La ley innata

Studio album by Extremoduro
- Released: 9 September 2008
- Genre: Hard rock, progressive rock
- Length: 45:08
- Language: Spanish
- Label: Warner Music
- Producer: Iñaki "Uoho" Antón

Extremoduro chronology
Grandes Éxitos y Fracasos (Episodio Segundo) (2004)	La ley innata (2008)	Material Defectuoso (2011)

La ley innata is the ninth studio album by Spanish hard rock band Extremoduro. It was produced by Iñaki "Uoho" Antón and published by Warner Music on 9 September 2008.

The cover of the album features a text in Latin language.

«Est enim, iudices, haec non scripta, sed nata lex, quam non didicimus, accepimus, legimus, verum ex natura ipsa arripuimus, hausimus, expressimus, ad quam non docti, sed facti, non instituti, sed imbuti sumus»

— Cicero in Pro milone.

Appearing as the main focus of the cover of the studio album. This quote is a segment of the wide known Pro milone speech belonging to Roman lawyer, philosopher and thinker Cicero. Known from his use of specch.

For indeed, judges. This law lies unscripted but embraced as an innate law; a law which we have not learned, received, or read, but one which we have seized, absorbed, and drawn forth from nature itself; a law for which we have not been instructed, but been made; not educated, but been imbued into.

It describes the innate response of defending oneself.

The album peaked at 1st place on PROMUSICAE's Top 100 Álbumes chart in its first week.

After Robe's passing, the first segment of the song: «Dulce introducción al caos» peaked at 42 on the Spanish PROMUSICAE Top 100 Canciones chart.

== Track listing ==
Lyrics by Roberto Iniesta, music by Roberto Iniesta and Iñaki Antón.

No.	Title	Length
1.	"Dulce introducción al caos"	7:42
2.	"Primer movimiento: el sueño"	6:03
3.	"Segundo movimiento: lo de fuera"	11:43
4.	"Tercer movimiento: lo de dentro"	7:36
5.	"Cuarto movimiento: la realidad"	5:49
6.	"Coda flamenca (otra realidad)"	6:14

== Personnel ==
Extremoduro

- Roberto "Robe" Iniesta – Vocals, guitar and backing vocals
- Iñaki "Uoho" Antón – Guitar, piano, organ and backing vocals
- Miguel Colino – Bass
- José Ignacio Cantera – Drums

Additional musicians

- Ara Malikian – Violin
- Thomas Potiron – Violin
- Humberto Armas – Viola
- Juan Pérez de Albéniz – Cello
- Gino Pavone –Percussion instrument
- Ander Erzilla – Oboe
- Mikel Piris – Flute
- Aiert Erkoreka – Piano
- Javier Mora – Piano on "Coda Flamenca (Otra Realidad)"
- Patxi Urchegui – Trumpet
- Sara Íñiguez – Backing vocals
- Airam Etxániz – Backing vocals
- Gastelo – Backing vocals on "Dulce introducción al caos"

== Charts and certifications ==
=== Chart performance ===
Chart (2008)	Peak position
Spanish Album Charts	1

=== Certifications ===
Region	Certification	Certified units/sales
Spain (Promusicae)	Gold	40,000^{^}
^{^} Shipments figures based on certification alone.
