= Burrock'n Roll =

- 1992 CD cover

Demo album by Platero y Tú
- Released: 1990; 24 February 1992 (CD Version)
- Recorded: July 1990, Estudios Arion (Pamplona)
- Genre: Rock and roll, hard rock
- Length: 38:38
- Label: DRO
- Producer: Platero y Tú

Platero y Tú chronology
Burrock'n Roll (1990)	Voy a Acabar Borracho (1991)

Singles from Burrock'n'roll
- 1. "Un ABC sin letras"

Burrock'n Roll is a demo tape by Spanish rock band Platero y Tú released in 1990. It was reissued by DRO on 24 February 1992. The outro of the song "Si tú te vas" is taken from Status Quo's version of the song Rockin' All Over the World.

Several songs from the album were re-recorded and released as part of the band's follow-up and mainstream debut Voy a Acabar Borracho.

== Track listing ==
1990 original track listing

Side one
No.	Title	Length
1.	"Un ABC sin letras"
2.	"Ramón"
3.	"No me quieres saludar"
4.	"Ya no existe la vida"
5.	"Vamos a ponernos muy bien"
6.	"Si tú te vas"

Side two
No.	Title	Length
7.	"Déjame en paz"
8.	"Canción pa' ti"
9.	"Cómo has perdido tú"
10.	"Esa chica tan cara"
11.	"Desertor"
12.	"Mira hacia a mi"

1992 reissue track listing

No.	Title	Writer(s)	Length
1.	"Un ABC sin letras"	Fito Cabrales	2:47
2.	"Ramón"	Iñaki Antón	5:03
3.	"No me quieres saludar"	Juantxu Olano	3:15
4.	"Vamos a ponernos muy bien"	Iñaki Antón	3:59
5.	"Si tú te vas"	Fito / Iñaki / Juantxu / Jesús	4:08
6.	"Déjame en paz"	Iñaki Antón / Fito Cabrales	4:46
7.	"Canción pa' ti"	Fito Cabrales / Iñaki Antón	3:47
8.	"Cómo has perdido tú"	Fito Cabrales / Iñaki Antón	4:07
9.	"Mira hacia mí"	Iñaki Antón	4:04
10.	"Ya no existe la vida"	Fito Cabrales	2:41

== Personnel ==
- Fito Cabrales: Vocals and guitar.
- Iñaki "Uoho" Antón: Guitar.
- Juantxu Olano: Bass.
- Jesús García: Drums.
