= Vamos Tirando =

Studio album by Platero y Tú
- Released: 30 April 1993
- Recorded: March 1993
- Genre: Rock and roll, hard rock, blues rock
- Length: 45:30
- Label: DRO
- Producer: Platero y Tú

Platero y Tú chronology
Muy Deficiente (1992)	Vamos Tirando (1993)	Hay Poco Rock & Roll (1994)

Singles from Vamos tirando
- 1. "Mari Madalenas"; 2. "Esta noche yo haría" 3. "No me hagas soplar" 4. "Tras la barra"

Vamos Tirando is the fourth studio album by Spanish rock band Platero y Tú. It was produced by Platero y Tú, recorded in March 1993 and published by DRO on 30 April 1993.

== Track listing ==
No.	Title	Writer(s)	Length
1.	"A un tipo listo"	Iñaki Antón / Fito Cabrales / Jesús	5:16
2.	"Esta noche yo haría"	Iñaki Antón / Fito Cabrales	3:17
3.	"No me hagas soplar"	Iñaki Antón / Fito Cabrales	3:16
4.	"Marabao"	Iñaki Antón / Fito Cabrales	3:16
5.	"Lo que os merecéis"	Fito / Iñaki	2:23
6.	"R&R Batzokian"	Josu Zabala	5:19
7.	"Bobo"	Iñaki / Fito	3:05
8.	"Mari Madalenas"	Iñaki / Fito	3:44
9.	"Tras la barra"	Iñaki Antón / Fito Cabrales	3:13
10.	"Me dan miedo las noches"	Juantxu / Jesús / Iñaki / Fito	3:58
11.	"Mírame"	Juantxu / Jesús / Iñaki / Fito	5:16
12.	"No estoy loco"	Iñaki / Fito	3:33

== Personnel ==
- Fito Cabrales: Vocals and guitar.
- Iñaki "Uoho" Antón: Guitar.
- Juantxu Olano: Bass.
- Jesús García: Drums.
