= Para Todos los Públicos =

Studio album by Extremoduro
- Released: 8 November 2013
- Genre: Hard rock, progressive rock
- Language: Spanish
- Label: Warner Music
- Producer: Iñaki "Uoho" Antón

Extremoduro chronology
Material Defectuoso (2011)	Para Todos los Públicos (2013)

Singles from Para Todos los Públicos
- 1. "¡Qué Borde Era Mi Valle!" Released: 22 October 2013

Professional ratings
Review scores
Source	Rating
Rolling Stone	4/5 stars

Para Todos los Públicos is the eleventh and final studio album by Spanish hard rock band Extremoduro, released on 8 November 2013. It was produced by Iñaki "Uoho" Antón, The album's recording started at early 2012 and it was finished at spring of 2013. It was published by Warner Music on 8 November 2013. The first single "¡Qué Borde Era Mi Valle!" was released on 22 October 2013. The album release date was initially scheduled for 19 November 2013 but the album was illegally leaked.

== Track listing ==
Lyrics written by Roberto Iniesta, music composed by Roberto Iniesta and Iñaki Antón.

No.	Title	Length
1.	"Locura Transitoria"	8:14
2.	"Entre Interiores"	4:07
3.	"¡Qué Borde Era Mi Valle!"	3:54
4.	"Poema Sobrecogido"	5:44
5.	"Manué IV"	0:30
6.	"Mama"	6:09
7.	"Mi Voluntad"	3:20
8.	"Pequeño Rocanrol Endémico"	5:08
9.	"El Camino de las Utopías"	7:30

== Personnel ==
Extremoduro

- Roberto "Robe" Iniesta – Vocals, guitar and backing vocals
- Iñaki "Uoho" Antón – Guitar, piano, keyboards and backing vocals
- Miguel Colino – Bass
- José Ignacio Cantera – Drums

Additional musicians

- María "Cebolleta" Martín – Backing vocals
- Gino Pavone –Percussion instrument
- Javier Mora – Piano and organ
- Ara Malikian – Violin
- Carmen Mª Elena González – Violin
- Humberto Armas – Viola
- Irene Etxebest – Violoncello
- Félix Landa – Backing vocals
- Agnes Lillith – Backing vocals
- Airam Etxaniz – Vocals on Poema Sobrecogido
- José Alberto Batiz – Second guitar solo on Pequeño Rocanrol Endémico

== Charts ==
=== Weekly charts ===
Weekly chart performance for Para Todos los Públicos
Chart (2013)	Peak position
Spanish Albums (PROMUSICAE)	1

=== Year-end charts ===
Year-end chart performance for Para Todos los Públicos
Chart (2013)	Position
Spanish Albums (PROMUSICAE)	15
Chart (2014)	Position
Spanish Albums (PROMUSICAE)	34

== Certifications ==
Region	Certification	Certified units/sales
Spain (PROMUSICAE)	Platinum	40,000^{^}
^{^} Shipments figures based on certification alone.

== Notes ==
=== External links ===
- Extremoduro official website (in Spanish)
