= Extremoduro =

Spanish hard rock band

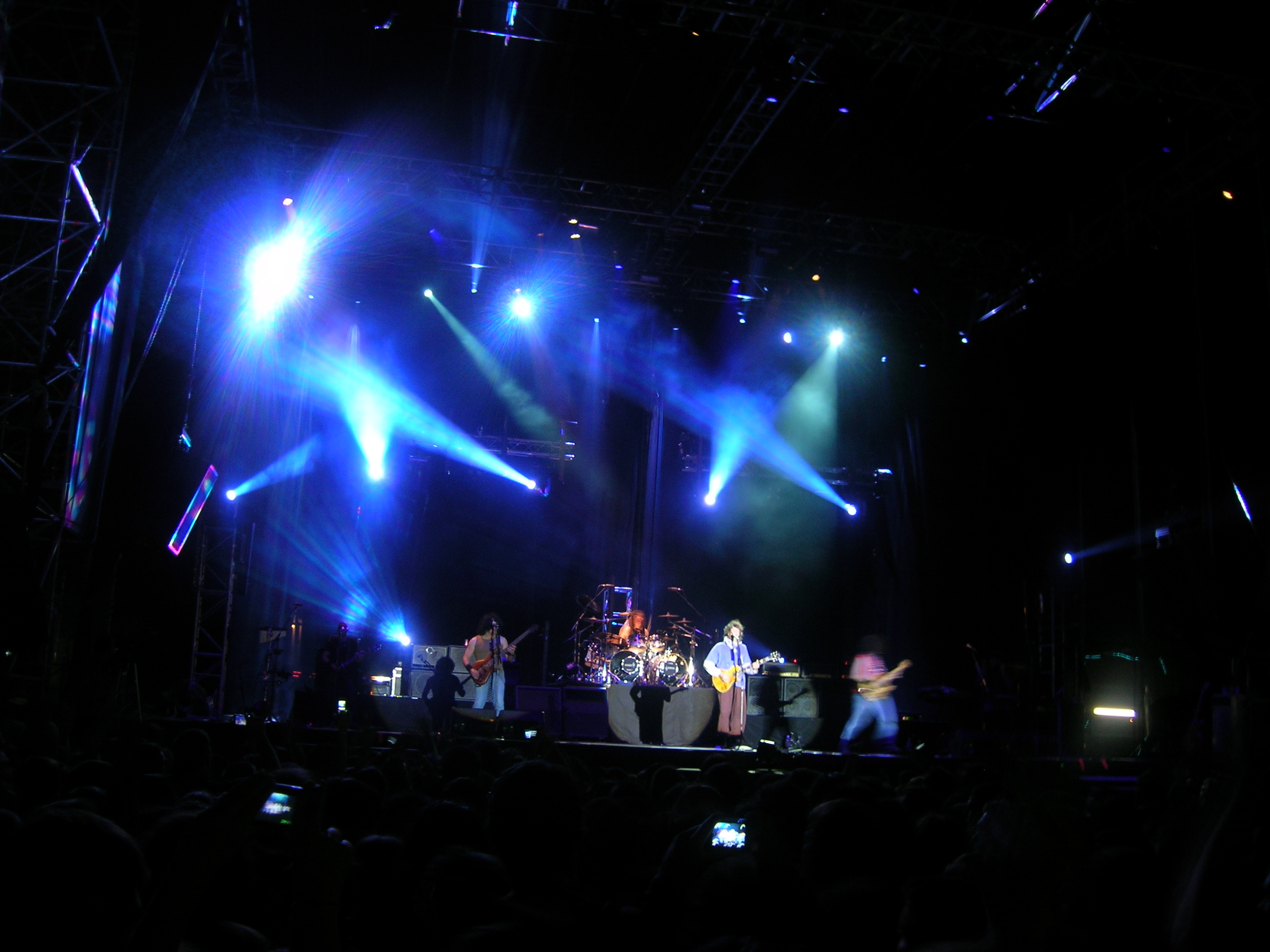
- Spanish hard rock band Extremoduro in concert in Getafe in 2008.

Background information
- Origin: Plasencia, Extremadura, Spain
- Genres: Hard rock; punk rock; progressive rock
- Years active: 1987–2019
- Labels: Avispa; Área Creativa/Pasión Cía. Discográfica; DRO/Warner Music Group; El Dromedario Records
- Members: Roberto Iniesta; Iñaki "Uoho" Antón; Miguel Colino; José Ignacio Cantera
- Past members: Salo; Eugenio; Iñaki "Milindris" Setién; Kaito; Carlos "El Sucio"; Miguel Ferreras; Ramón "Mon" Sogas "William"; Luis "von Fanta"; Jorge "El Moja"; Alberto "Capi" Gil; Diego Garay
- Website: extremoduro.com

Extremoduro (Spanish pronunciation: [e(ɣ)stɾemoˈðuɾo]) was a Spanish hard rock band from Plasencia, Extremadura. The band was led by Roberto Iniesta, also known as "Robe", who is often referred as "El rey de Extremadura" (lit. 'the king of Extremadura'). The name Extremoduro is a pun on the band's home region in western Spain, Extremadura, and may be translated as "extremely tough", "rough edge", or "hard extreme".

The band was created in 1987 and is regarded as one of the most influential bands of the Spanish hard rock scene, besides being a symbolic representative for their region. Influenced by Spanish literature, Iniesta's lyrics are often described as rude street poetry, with frequent allusions to drugs, sex and self-destruction.

Songs by Extremoduro include "So payaso", "Golfa", "Salir", "Extremaydura", "Puta" and "Jesucristo García". The highest moment in the band's career was probably reached with the release of their album Agila, which was awarded a prize for best video in the first edition of the Spanish Music Awards in 1997.

It is considered one of the best Spanish bands ever by several music magazines. They were ranked number 6 on Rolling Stone's "50 Greatest Spanish rock bands".

In December 2019, the band announced a farewell tour of eight cities for May and June 2020. Due to the COVID-19 pandemic, the tour was first postponed to autumn 2020, then cancelled and the band officially disbanded.

== History ==
=== 1987 to 1991 ===
Extremoduro's logo.

Roberto Iniesta (also known as "Robe") established the band in the summer of 1987 in Plasencia, the second most important city of Cáceres, a province of the west of Spain. Previously, in 1983, he had formed the band ‘Dosis Letal’ with Zósimo "Zosi" Pascual, with whom he composed the song "La Carrera", that would later come to be the penultimate track of Extremoduro's 1996 disc Agíla.

Extremoduro were initially formed by Robe, as vocalist and guitarist, "Chico" on the bass and "Miguelin" on the drums. This initial set-up lasted just a few months, after which Robe decided to reconfigure the group and found Salo and Louis "von Fanta" to replace Kaito and William respectively. With this new dynamic in place, and with the difficulty they faced recording an album, they decided to sell vouchers to their acquaintances (at a thousand pesetas each) that would entitle each of them to a copy of the demo tape after it had been produced. They sold 250 of these "coupons" (whose buyers are credited in the finished production). After this, they produced 1000 copies of this first "demo" which already contained some of the quintessential anthems of the group, such as "Extremaydura" or "Jesucristo Garcia"; the collection is Rock transgresivo.

The distribution of this transgressive musical offering of rock began to attract attention inside and outside their home region of Plasencia; it was so well received that the Spanish television program Plastic invited them for a live performance. They were then selected for the national final of the Yamaha trophy in which they finished third.

It was in this final that Avispa Music noticed them and began negotiations for the release of their debut professionally recorded album, Tú en tu casa, nosotros en la hoguera. The album was recorded that summer, containing the same songs as Rock Transgresivo (in addition to "Amor Castúo"). The group often expressed dissatisfaction with the outcome and, in fact, in 1994 it was remixed and partially re-recorded to be reissued under another name.

At the end of this deal-making 1989, Robe restructured the band again: he switched to the role of supporting guitarist, to focus on the delivery of the vocals. In this way, Salo became lead guitarist and Carlos "Dirty" took up the vacancy for a bassist. In 1991, a deal was struck with Wasp to record the second album, but due to the poor expectations that the label offered, they decided to break this contract and sign with Pasión-Área Creativa, like Avispa Music, an independent company, but this time with better conditions. They recorded a second album with them in Madrid Somos unos animales, published in July 1991.

With the collaboration of vocalist and guitarist Madrid Rosendo Mercado (ex-Leño) on the songs " La canción de los oficios " (voice) and " Perro Callejero " (guitar), they themselves define it as the beginning of the true sound of Extremoduro that the band calls "transgressive Rock."

In this first period, drugs – especially heroin – were the inseparable 'other member' of the group. As such, the group's live performances (usually considered their greatest asset) were unpredictable to say the least. Though they now had presence in the Spanish rock scene, it was said that Extremoduro's live gigs were either "unforgettable or a disaster." The group began to sell a lot and Pasión-Área Creativa proved too small for their ambitions, which together with other disputes (royalties not being paid for this LP), led to them signing with DRO in 1991, giving them better distribution and promotion, and the means to the success that later years brought.

=== DRO Atlantic signing ===
DRO (Discos Radioactivos Organizados) was a record company founded in the '80s as Spain's first independent record label by members of the Aviator Dro techno pop outfit. When Extremoduro got signed up with them in 1992, it was one of the largest independent labels in Spain, in the process of a sale to Warner Music International, one of the most important multinational actors in the music business. Although the label has changed its name (DRO-Atlantic, DRO East-West, Warner Music España...), Extremoduro has published all of its albums through them since signing up. Indeed, they have re-edited their two previous albums with DRO.

In 1992, the third studio album came to be; the first within their contract with DRO, Deltoya. This had its origin in a spin-off project from the band, of Robe's: Extremozoide, although circumstances would cause this to be published as another album of Extremoduro's. The album has a more erotic—and less social—theme than the previous discs, and most of the lyrics are adaptations of the poems by Kiko "Luna Creciente", Tomás Rodríguez (the band's manager) and Manolo Chinato. The album includes the voices and participation of other artists, such as Argentinian singer and guitarist Ariel Rot in "Volando solo". It would not be the last time that Robe hatched a project that was independent of the group, nor the last time that this independence would prove to be short lived.

1993 is a crucial year in the history of Extremoduro. For starters, they cross paths with Iñaki "Uoho" Antón (then guitarist of Platero y Tú) in Bilbao and together with other musicians start a new project: La Pedrá. Robe is responsible for voice and guitar, Uoho for a second guitar, keyboards and percussion, and they join Dieguillo (bassist for Quemando Ruedas, Cicatriz, Antisocial), Gary (drums for Quattro Clavos) and Selu (from Reincidentes) with his saxophone and cante jondo. In August, they take to the studio to record a half-hour of music but it is highly experimental and discontinuous and the label refuses to back it, as it is seen as too risky. They would have to wait two more years for it to be sold commercially. Still, thanks to the stability that DRO gives the band, Robe is able to start a side project to Extremoduro in Barcelona: The Q3. This gives space to accommodate the ideas that did not work within Extremoduro. Jorge "el Moja" is on drums, Eugene on the guitar, Miguel Ferreras on bass and Ramón Sogas "Mon", on the other bass.

Meanwhile, drugs continue to permeate Extremoduro, and throughout the tour there are disagreements in the band that lead to its break up. After being part of the band since recording the demo, and three albums, drummer Luis "von Fanta", bassist Carlos "el Sucio" and guitarist Salo left the group. Robe, not about to see the band go down the pan, or abandon their dreams, replaces the disbanded members of Extremoduro with members of Q3, which marks the end of this project, but saves Extremoduro. It was with this collection of musicians that recorded the fourth album: ¿Dónde están mis amigos?, which continues the style begun with Deltoya and confirms their reputation as one of the most important groups of Spanish rock. They remain unknown to the public at large due to their political incorrectness and raw style. The album was recorded in autumn 1993 and was published later that year. While all his works hitherto had been self-produced, this is the first record for which they hired a professional producer: Ventura Rico. This LP is considered the most personal and intimate of the band. This is probably due to the disintegration of the group, because now the other musicians are employees in a band that is directed by Robe himself. Fernando Madina from Reincidentes takes part in the song Pepe Botika (¿Dónde están mis amigos?).

== Band members ==
=== Last line-up ===
- Roberto Iniesta, "Robe": voice and guitar
- Iñaki "Uoho" Antón: guitar, keyboard and other instruments
- Miguel Colino: bass
- José Ignacio Cantera: drums

=== Previous band members ===
- Guitar:
  - Salo (1990–1993).
  - Eugenio (1993–1994).
  - Iñaki "Milindris" Setién (1994–1997).
- Bass:
  - "Kaito" (1987–1988).
  - Salo (1988–1990).
  - Carlos "el Sucio" (1990–1993).
  - Miguel Ferreras (1993–1994)
  - Ramón "Mon" Sogas (1993–1998).
  - "Dieguillo" Garay (1998–2001) and bass guitar on Pedrá (1995)
- Drums:
  - "William" (1987–1988).
  - Luis "von Fanta" (1988–1993).
  - Jorge "el Moja" (1993–1994).
  - Alberto "Capi" Gil (1994–1997).

== Discography ==
=== Main albums ===
- Rock Transgresivo (1989) (Note: After recording their demo tape Rock Transgresivo in January 1989, they released their first studio album Tú en Tu Casa, Nosotros en la Hoguera. The result left them unsatisfied so the original demo tape was remixed and it was released in August 1994 in order to replace the older studio album.)
- Somos unos Animales (1991)
- Deltoya (1992)
- ¿Dónde Están Mis Amigos? (1993)
- Pedrá (1995)
- Agila (1996)
- Iros Todos a Tomar por Culo (1997) (Live album)
- Canciones Prohibidas (1998)
- Yo, Minoría Absoluta (2002)
- Grandes éxitos y fracasos (Episodio primero) (2004) (Compilation album)
- Grandes éxitos y fracasos (Episodio segundo) (2004) (Compilation album)
- La Ley Innata (2008)
- Material Defectuoso (2011)
- Para Todos los Públicos (2013)
- Canciones (1989-2013) (2021) No.21 Spain

=== Videography ===
- Gira 2002 (2004, DVD live performance)

== See also ==
- Platero y Tú
- Extrechinato y Tú
- Inconscientes
- Fito & Fitipaldis
- Marea
- Rosendo
