= Deltoya =

Studio album by Extremoduro
- Released: June 1992
- Recorded: 1992, Estudios Box, Madrid
- Genre: Hard rock
- Length: 47:06
- Language: Spanish
- Label: DRO
- Producer: Extremoduro

Extremoduro chronology
Somos unos Animales (1991)	Deltoya (1992)	¿Dónde Están Mis Amigos? (1993)

Deltoya is the third studio album by Spanish hard rock band Extremoduro. It was produced by Extremoduro, recorded and published by Dro Records in 1992. The album has a more erotic—and less social—theme than the previous discs, and most of the lyrics are adaptations of the poems by Kiko "Luna Creciente", Kiko Murillo from Trujillo and Manolo Chinato. The front page was a portrait painting by Chuty, from Tope Ganso Collective from Trujillo. The album includes the voices and participation of other artists, such as Argentinian singer and guitarist Ariel Rot in "Volando solo".

== Track listing ==
No.	Title	Writer(s)	Length
1.	"Sol de invierno"	Roberto Iniesta	4:51
2.	"De acero"	Roberto Iniesta	3:45
3.	"Última generación"	Roberto Iniesta / T. Rodríguez	3:00
4.	"Lucha contigo"	Roberto Iniesta	4:00
5.	"Con un latido del reloj"	Roberto Iniesta	3:45
6.	"Bulerías de la sangre caliente"	Roberto Iniesta	3:52
7.	"Deltoya"	Roberto Iniesta	5:42
8.	"Relación convencional"	Roberto Iniesta	3:02
9.	"Volando solo"	Roberto Iniesta	3:34
10.	"Ama, ama, ama y ensancha el alma"	Manolo Chinato / Roberto Iniesta	2:35
11.	"Papel secante"	Roberto Iniesta	5:00
12.	"Estado policial"	Roberto Iniesta	4:06

2011 edition bonus tracks

No.	Title	Writer(s)	Length
13.	"Ama, Ama, Ama y Ensancha el Alma[*]"	Roberto Iniesta / Manolo Chinato	2:47
14.	"Sol de Invierno[*]"	Roberto Iniesta	4:33
15.	"Papel Secante[*]"	Roberto Iniesta	4:55
16.	"Deltoya[*]"	Roberto Iniesta	5:31
17.	"Bulerías de la Sangre Caliente[*]"	Roberto Iniesta	3:37
18.	"De Acero[*]"	Roberto Iniesta	3:42
19.	"Estado Policial[*]"	Roberto Iniesta	3:55
20.	"Volando Sólo[*]"	Roberto Iniesta	3:31

- * Bonus tracks are on their 2004 version.

== Personnel ==
Extremoduro

- Robe Iniesta – Guitar and vocals
- Salo – Guitar
- Carlos "el Sucio" – Bass
- Luis "von Fanta" – Drums

Additional personnel

- María – Vocals on Sol de Invierno, Con un Latido del Reloj, Papel Secante and Ama, Ama, Ama y Ensancha el Alma
- Belén – Vocals on Sol de Invierno, Con un Latido del Reloj, Papel Secante and Ama, Ama, Ama y Ensancha el Alma
- Salvador – Guitar on De Acero and Relación Convencional
- Rafa Kas – Guitar, keyboards and vocals on Lucha Contigo
- Ariel Rot – Guitar on Volando Sólo
- Luisma – Vocals on Papel Secante

== Charts ==
Chart performance for Deltoya
Chart (2026)	Peak position
Spanish Albums (PROMUSICAE)	92

== Certifications ==
Region	Certification	Certified units/sales
Spain (PROMUSICAE)	Platinum	100,000^{^}
^{^} Shipments figures based on certification alone.
