= Somos unos Animales =

Studio album by Extremoduro
- Released: July 1991
- Recorded: 1991, Estudios Audiomadrid
- Genre: Hard rock
- Length: 38:38
- Label: Pasión-Área Creativa
- Producer: Extremoduro

Extremoduro chronology
Rock Transgresivo (1989)	Somos unos Animales (1991)	Deltoya (1992)

Somos unos Animales (Spanish: We’re Such Animals) is the second studio album by the Spanish hard rock band Extremoduro recorded in two weeks and released under the Pasión-Área Creativa label in July 1991. With the collaboration of vocalist and guitarist Rosendo Mercado (ex-Leño) on the songs " La canción de los oficios " (vocals) and " Perro Callejero " (guitar). Released in CD format on 27 October 1995 under DRO label.

== Track listing ==
All songs written by Roberto Iniesta.

Side one
No.	Title	Length
1.	"Tu corazón"	4:50
2.	"La canción de los oficios"	3:52
3.	"Quemando tus recuerdos"	5:50
4.	"V Centenario"	3:23
5.	"J.D. La central nuclear"	1:29

Side two
No.	Title	Length
6.	"Ni príncipes ni princesas"	4:21
7.	"Perro callejero"	2:59
8.	"Desidia"	4:30
9.	"Resolución"	3:52
10.	"Necesito droga y amor (Los camellos no me fían)"	3:26

2011 edition bonus tracks

No.	Title	Length
11.	"Tu corazón[*]"	4:52
12.	"Necesito droga y amor[*]"	3:47
13.	"La canción de los oficios[*]"	3:19
14.	"Quemando tus recuerdos[*]"	5:31

- * Bonus tracks are on their 2004 version.

== Personnel ==
Extremoduro

- Robe Iniesta – vocals, guitar
- Salo – guitar, bass
- Carlos "el Sucio" – bass
- Luis "von Fanta" – drums

Additional personnel

- Rosendo Mercado (ex-Leño) – Vocals on "La canción de los oficios" and guitar on "Perro Callejero"
- J. L. Macías – Piano on "La canción de los oficios" and kazoo on "Ni príncipes ni princesas"
- Goyo Esteban – Organ on "Ni príncipes ni princesas"
- María y Belén – Backing vocals on "Tu corazón", "Quemando tus recuerdos" and "Desidia"
- Engineering: Kike Díez
- Assistant engineering: Goyo Esteban and Kiji
- Design: T. Rodríguez and Carmelo Oñate

== Charts and certifications ==
=== Certifications ===
Region	Certification	Certified units/sales
Spain (PROMUSICAE)	Gold	50,000^{^}
^{^} Shipments figures based on certification alone.
