= Marea (band) =

Spanish rock band

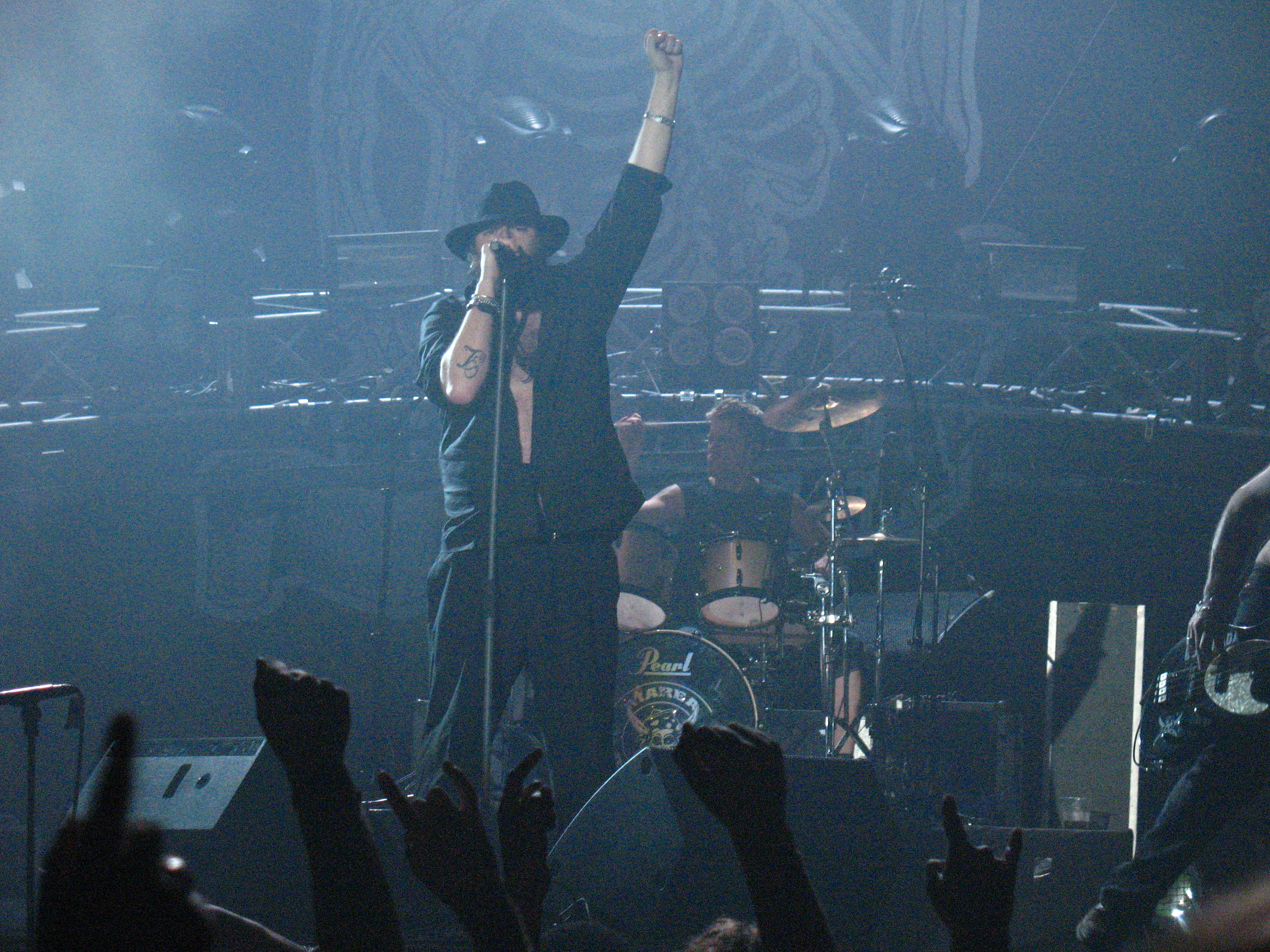
- Kutxi Romero at Pavelló Olímpic de Badalona.

Background information
- Origin: Spain
- Genres: Hard rock
- Years active: 1997–present
- Labels: BGM (1997–2000); GOR (2000–2001); Dro Records (2001–present)
- Members: Kutxi Romero - vocals Alen Ayerdi - drums César Ramallo - Electric guitar David Díaz "Kolibrí" - Electric guitar and acoustic guitar Edu Beaumont "Piñas" - Bass
- Website: Official website

Marea are a Spanish rock band from Berriozar, Navarre formed in 1997 by Kutxi Romero. The band deals with lyrics influenced by Spanish folklore and literature using archaic terms and expressions.

They have released eight studio albums, a collection boxset and a live album.

== History ==
In 1997, after having been a member of 9 different punk bands, Kutxi Romero decided to form a rock group.

He called Alen Ayerdi - former drummer of Begira - who joined Kutxi's project. He then contacted Edu Beaumont "Piñas", whom he had met one year before. Piñas had not previously played in any other band, but Kutxi - who was a very good friend of his - persuaded him to join as bassist. Piñas accepted and introduced Kutxi to César Ramallo, who would become one of Marea's guitarists. David Díaz, a.k.a. Kolibrí, also a guitarist, also joined the band.

The band was initially called "La Patera" but as a band with the same name already existed they adopted the name Marea, that was supposed to be the title of their first album that they instead named La Patera.

BMG expressed an interest in their first album and in 1999 they became Marea's first label. Their first album was released all across Spain.

In 2000, due to problems with BMG they left them to join GOR. That year they released their second album: Revolcón.

A year later, on 2001, they began having conflicts with GOR and they ended their contract with them. They signed a new one with Dro Records. They began working on their 3rd album, Besos de perro.

Besos de Perro was released in 2002. After having played live about 200 times in approximately 3 years, they decided to a break from touring to work on their following album.

In 2004, they released their fourth album, 28.000 Puñaladas. They began touring until 2005.

In 2006, Kutxi Romero announced that Marea were working on their fifth album, Las aceras están llenas de piojos, which was released in 2007.

Also in 2007, Marea released the boxset Coces al aire 1997-2007. It includes two CDs; one featuring 18 of their best songs (Coces al aire), and one with previously unreleased songs and alternate versions (Jaurías de perros verdes), 2 DVDs - one with all their videos and some live recording and another including a whole live concert, a picture book and a biography of the band written by the journalist J. Óscar Beorlegui.

In 2008 they released Las putas más viejas del mundo, a live CD+DVD.

In 2011 they released their sixth studio album En mi hambre mando yo mixed in Canada by Mike Fraser.

== Members ==
- Kutxi Romero: lead vocals and lyrics
- Eduardo Beaumont (Piñas): bass and vocals (occasionally).
- César Ramallo: electric guitar
- David ''Kolibrí'' Díaz: electric and acoustic guitar
- Alén Ayerdi: drums and backing vocals

== Discography ==
- La Patera (1999)
- Revolcón (2000)
- Besos de perro (2002)
- 28.000 puñaladas (2004)
- Las aceras están llenas de piojos (2007)
- Coces al aire (2007, collection with unreleased tracks and DVD)
- Las putas más viejas del mundo (2008, live CD + DVD)
- En mi hambre mando yo (2011)
- El azogue (2019)
- Los Potros del Tiempo (2022)

=== Compilation albums ===
- 2007- Secos los pies: 1997-2007 (2007)
- 2007- Coces al aire: 1997-2007 (2007)
- 2008- Jauría de perros verdes (2008)
