= Hay Mucho Rock'n Roll =

Hay Mucho Rock'n Roll is a compilation series by Spanish rock band Platero y Tú. Most of the songs are re-recorded and remastered due to the low quality audio in previous releases.

== Volume 1 ==
Hay Mucho Rock'n Roll Volumen 1

Compilation album by Platero y Tú
- Released: 18 November 2002
- Genres: Rock and roll, hard rock, blues rock
- Length: 78:18
- Label: DRO
- Producer: Iñaki Antón

Platero y Tú chronology
Correos (2000)	Hay Mucho Rock'n Roll Volumen 1 (2002)	Hay Mucho Rock'n Roll Vol 2 (2005)

No.	Title	Length
1.	"Voy a acabar borracho"
2.	"Bobo"
3.	"Esa chica tan cara"
4.	"Mari Madalenas"
5.	"El roce de tu cuerpo"
6.	"Tras la barra"
7.	"Por mí"
8.	"Esta noche yo haría"
9.	"Me dan miedo las noches"
10.	"Ramón"
11.	"Rompe los cristales"
12.	"Somos los Platero"
13.	"Hay poco Rock'n Roll"
14.	"Sin Solución"
15.	"Cantalojas"
16.	"Si tú te vas"
17.	"Cigarrito"

DVD Music videos
N.º	Title
01	No me quieres saludar
02	Si tú te vas
03	Rompe los cristales
04	Esta noche yo haría
05	Hay poco Rock & Roll
06	Juliette
07	Alucinante
08	Al cantar
09	Naufragio

== Volume 2 ==
Hay mucho Rock'n Roll Volumen 2

Compilation album by Platero y Tú
- Released: 5 December 2005
- Genres: Rock and roll, hard rock, blues rock
- Length: 64:41
- Label: DRO
- Producer: Iñaki Antón

Platero y Tú chronology
Hay Mucho Rock'n Roll Vol 1 (2002)	Hay mucho Rock'n Roll Volumen 2 (2005)	Hay Mucho Rock'n Roll Resumen (2005)

No.	Title	Length
1.	"Tiemblan los corazones"
2.	"Ya no existe la vida"
3.	"¿Cómo has perdido tú?"
4.	"Un abecedario sin letras"
5.	"Alucinante"
6.	"Si la tocas otra vez"
7.	"Bebiendo del mismo vaso"
8.	"¿No hierve tu sangre?"
9.	"Juliette"
10.	"La noche"
11.	"Mira hacia mí"
12.	"Entre dos mares"
13.	"La maté porque era mía"
14.	"Al cantar"
15.	"Contaminamos"
16.	"No me quieres saludar"
17.	"Maldita mujer"
18.	"Imanol"

DVD Live at Sala Canciller, Madrid 1997
N.º	Title
01	Somos los Platero
02	No hierve tu sangre
03	La maté porque era mía
04	Mendrugos
05	Alucinante
06	Desertor
07	Voy a acabar borracho
08	Tras la barra
09	Rock'n'Roll
10	Al cantar

== Resumen Edition ==
Hay Mucho Rock'n Roll Resumen

Compilation album by Platero y Tú
- Released: 5 December 2005
- Genres: Rock and roll, hard rock, blues rock
- Label: DRO
- Producer: Iñaki Antón

Platero y Tú chronology
Hay Mucho Rock'n Roll Vol 2 (2005)	Hay Mucho Rock'n Roll Resumen (2005)

No.	Title	Length
1.	"Ya no existe la vida"
2.	"Un abecedario sin letras"
3.	"Alucinante"
4.	"Si la tocas otra vez"
5.	"Juliette"
6.	"Al cantar"
7.	"Maldita mujer"
8.	"Hay poco rock'n'roll"
9.	"Por mí"
10.	"Mari Madalenas"
11.	"El roce de tu cuerpo"
12.	"Me dan miedo las noches"
13.	"Ramón"
14.	"Sin solución"
15.	"Cantalojas"
16.	"Cigarrito"
