= Iñaki Antón =

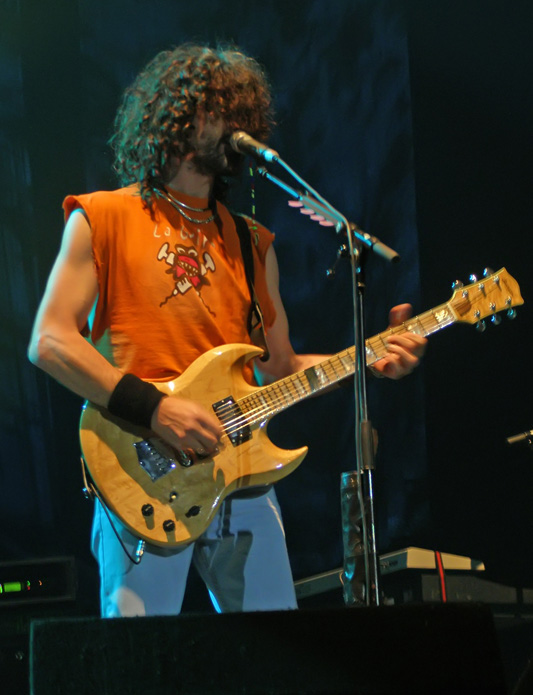
- Antón with Extremoduro at the Palacio de los Deportes de Madrid in 2008

Background information
- Also known as: Uoho
- Born: Iñaki Antón González; August 3, 1964 (age 61)
- Origin: Bilbao, Spain
- Genres: Hard rock, rock and roll, blues rock
- Occupations: Musician, songwriter, producer
- Instruments: Guitar, piano, keyboards, trombone
- Years active: 1989–present
- Label: Dro
- Website: www.extremoduro.com www.plateroytu.com www.inconscientes.es muxik.es

Iñaki Antón González (Spanish pronunciation: [iˈɲakjanˈtoŋ gonˈθaleθ]; August 3, 1964), also known by his stage name Uoho, is a Spanish musician, songwriter and record producer. He is best known for having been the lead guitarist of Platero y Tú and Extremoduro.

== Biography ==
Iñaki Antón González was born on August 3, 1964, in Bilbao. He spent his youth at Zabala (Bilbao), where he met his Platero y Tú bandmates. He started with classical music learning piano. At 14 or 15 years old started to listen to classic rock bands such as Deep Purple or Status Quo and at 17 or 18 he learned to play guitar self-taught. He started playing with Juantxu Olano in a band called Ke and they recorded a four songs demo tape. In 1989 Antón joined Juantxu, Jesús García and Fito Cabrales and they formed Platero y Tú. He also started a collaboration with the band Extremoduro and from 1996 he joined them too. In 2001 Antón, Fito and Roberto Iniesta formed the supergroup Extrechinato y Tú along with poet Manolo Chinato. The following year, Fito gave an interview to the press and he confirmed that he left Platero y Tú, and consequently the group disbanded. He created the record label Muxik along with Robe in 2006. Antón also formed another band called Inconscientes that year and released a studio album in 2007 under his own label, Muxik.

== Discography ==
=== Platero y Tú ===
- Voy a Acabar Borracho, (1991), Welcome Records. Reedited by DRO in 1996.
- Burrock'n Roll, (1992), DRO.
- Muy Deficiente, (1992), DRO.
- Vamos Tirando, (1993), DRO.
- Hay Poco Rock & Roll, (1994), DRO
- A Pelo, (1996), DRO
- 7, (1997), DRO
- Correos, (2000), DRO
- Hay Mucho Rock'n Roll, Volumen I (2002) and Volumen II (2005), DRO

=== Extremoduro ===
- Pedrá, (1995)
- Agila, (1996)
- Iros Todos a Tomar por Culo, (1997) (Live Album)
- Canciones Prohibidas, (1998)
- Yo, Minoría Absoluta, (2002)
- Grandes Éxitos y Fracasos, Episodio I (2004) and Episodio II (2005) (Compilation Album)
- La Ley Innata (2008)
- Material Defectuoso (2011)
- Para Todos los Públicos (2013)

=== Extrechinato y Tú ===
- Poesía Básica (2001), Dro.

=== Inconscientes ===
- La Inconsciencia de Uoho, (2007), Muxik.
- Quimeras y otras realidades, (2016), El Dromedario Records.
- No somos viento, (2018), El Dromedario Records.

== Career as record producer ==
=== Extremoduro ===
- Rock transgresivo (1994, along with Extremoduro)
- Agila (1996)
- Iros todos a tomar por culo (1997)
- Canciones prohibidas (1998)
- Yo, minoría absoluta (2002)
- Grandes éxitos y fracasos (Episodio primero) (2004)
- Grandes éxitos y fracasos (Episodio segundo) (2004)
- La ley innata (2008)
- Material defectuoso (2011)
- Para todos los públicos (2013)

=== Marea ===
- Besos de perro (2003)

=== Chorra 'n Rock ===
- En peligro de extinción (2003)

=== Afónicos Perdidos ===
- Sin dar marcha atrás (2004)

=== Fito and Fitipaldis ===
- A puerta cerrada (1998)
- Los sueños locos (2001)
- Lo más lejos a tu lado (2003)

=== Despistaos ===
- Lejos (2006)

=== Doctor Deseo ===
- Sexo, ternura y misterio (2008)

=== Memoria de Pez ===
- En el mar de los sueños (2008)

=== Forraje ===
- Retales de vino y luna (2009)

=== Gatibu ===
- Zoramena (2002)
- Disko Infernu (2005)
- Laino Guztien Gainetik, Sasi Guztien Azpitik (2008)

=== James Room ===
- Bulletman (2020)
- Chocolate Jesus (2020)
- Comin' Down (2020)
