= Fito Cabrales =

Spanish musician

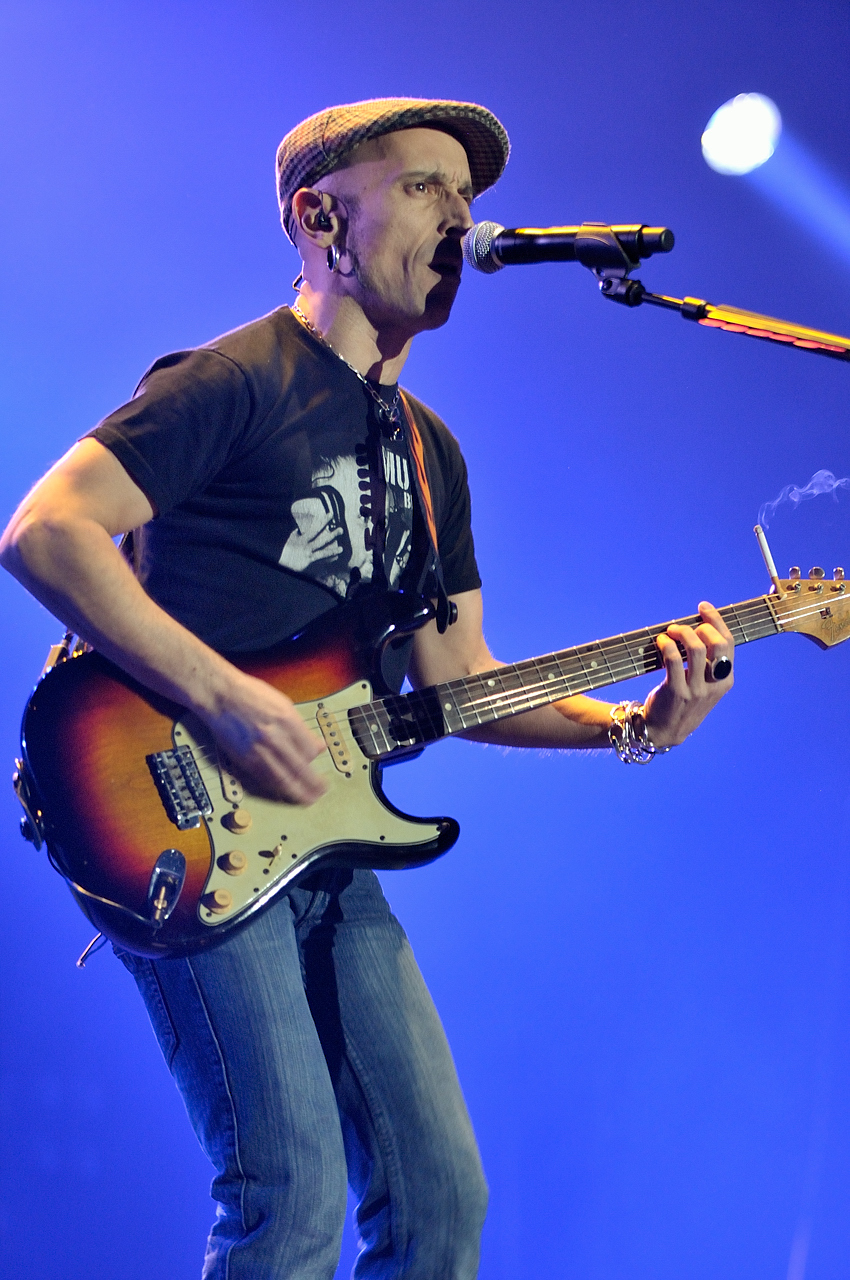
- Fito live with the Fitipaldis in 2009

Background information
- Also known as: Fito
- Born: Adolfo Cabrales Mato; 6 October 1966 (age 59); Bilbao, Spain
- Genres: Rock 'n' roll; blues rock; hard rock; rockabilly; rhythm & blues; swing
- Occupations: Musician; songwriter
- Instruments: Guitar; banjo
- Years active: 1989–present
- Label: Dro
- Formerly of: Platero y Tú; Fito & Fitipaldis; Extrechinato y Tú
- Website: www.plateroytu.com www.fitoyfitipaldis.com

Adolfo "Fito" Cabrales Mato (Spanish pronunciation: [aˈðolfo kaˈβɾales ˈmato]; born 6 October 1966) is a Spanish musician. He has been singer and guitarist of the bands Platero y Tú, Extrechinato y Tú and his current band Fito & Fitipaldis. As of October 2014, he sold more than 2.6 million records throughout his career; 1.6 million of which corresponded to sales of Fito & Fitipaldis alone.

== Biography ==
Adolfo "Fito" Cabrales was born on 6 October 1966 in the Zabala neighbourhood in Bilbao, and spent part of his childhood and adolescence in Laredo, Cantabria, and Málaga. In his youth he worked as a barman in the brothel his father owned. In these early periods of his musical career he admits to having consumed drugs, although now he declares himself "clean". A Spanish guitarist plays in the original and concert songs in Bilbao.

In 1989 Fito joined Iñaki "Uoho" Antón, Juantxu "Mongol" Olano and Jesús "Maguila" García, raised also in Fito's neighborhood, and formed the group Platero y Tú. They recorded their first album in 1991, Voy a acabar borracho ("I will end up drunk"). During the 90s, Platero made a name in the Spanish rock scene, and formed links to other important artists such as La Polla Records (Evaristo has a collaboration in the song Juliette), Rosendo Mercado (Sin solución) and, most prominently, the group Extremoduro, with whom they made a joint tour in 1996.

In 1998, and in parallel to Platero y Tú, the group Fito & Fitipaldis is formed, with the aim of publishing the songs that do not fit in the Platero repertoire. At first both groups coexisted without problems, but after Platero y Tú dissolved in 2001, Fito worked exclusively in his new group, obtaining an even greater success.

Fito is remarkable both in style and personality. He is thin and short (about 1.64 m and 50 kg), usually wears long sideboards and a shaven scalp. He is nearly always seen wearing a flat cap, which he used to give away after concerts (when he was with Platero y Tú.)

He currently lives in the town of Guernica, Biscay. He has three children: Guillermo (born in 1997), Diego (born in 2002) and Marisa (born in 2015).

Fito received a Latin Grammy nomination in 2015 for Best Rock Song for "Entre la Espada y Pared". His musical career stopped between 2015 and 2022, a period in which he coped with various addictions. After receiving professional treatment in a detoxification clinic, he clung to music as “his salvation, his guide in the midst of the storm”. After this period of introspection and personal reconstruction, Fito y Fitipaldis released 'Cada Vez Cadáver', an album that reflects the emotional journey he has lived, and which was published in 2022.

=== Platero y Tú ===
In 1989 he joined Iñaki Antón, Juantxu «Mongol» Olano and Jesús «Maguila» García, also from the same neighbourhood, to form the rock and roll group Platero y Tú. Platero y Tú distanced itself from the Basque radical rock that was so in vogue at that time to embrace the more classic rock tradition via Status Quo, Leño, AC/DC, The Rolling Stones or John Fogerty, with lyrics that speak of bars, love, drugs and rock and roll.

They maintained a close relationship with other important artists of their genre such as La Polla Records, Rosendo Mercado (who collaborated on Sin solución) and especially with Roberto Iniesta, "Robe", voice and guitar from Extremoduro, with whom they went on a joint tour in 1996. Throughout their career they achieved three Gold records and one Platinum record in Spain until 2002.

== Influences ==
Despite the differences between the Platero y Tú rock & roll, and the blues, soul and jazz mix of Fito & Fitipaldis, Fito has always sung of personal stories, often revolving around night-life, bars, drugs and women.

He refers to his time working in a brothel and other run-down areas of Bilbao in some of his songs: in the Platero y Tú album Muy deficiente, there is a song devoted to the Cantalojas bridge, and a "girl of the Cortes" (a prostitute in the neighborhood by that name.)

== Discography ==
=== Platero y Tú ===
- Voy a Acabar Borracho, (1991), Welcome Records. Reedited by DRO in 1996.
- Burrock'n Roll, (1992), DRO.
- Muy Deficiente, (1992), DRO.
- Vamos Tirando, (1993), DRO.
- Hay Poco Rock & Roll, (1994), DRO
- A Pelo, (1996), DRO
- 7, (1997), DRO
- Correos, (2000), DRO
- Hay Mucho Rock'n Roll, Volumen I (2002) and Volumen II (2005), DRO

=== Extrechinato y Tú ===
- Poesía básica, (2001), DRO

=== Fito & Fitipaldis ===
- A puerta cerrada, (1998), DRO
- Los sueños locos, (2001), DRO
- Lo más lejos a tu lado, (2003), DRO
- Vivo... para contarlo, (live, 2004), DRO
- Por la boca vive el pez, (2006), DRO
- Antes de que cuente diez, (2009), DRO
- Huyendo conmigo de mí, (2014), DRO
- Cada vez cadáver, (2021), DRO
- El Monte de los Aullidos, (2025), DRO

== See also ==
- Platero y Tú
- Fito & Fitipaldis
- Extrechinato y Tú
