= Reincidentes =

Spanish rock/punk rock band

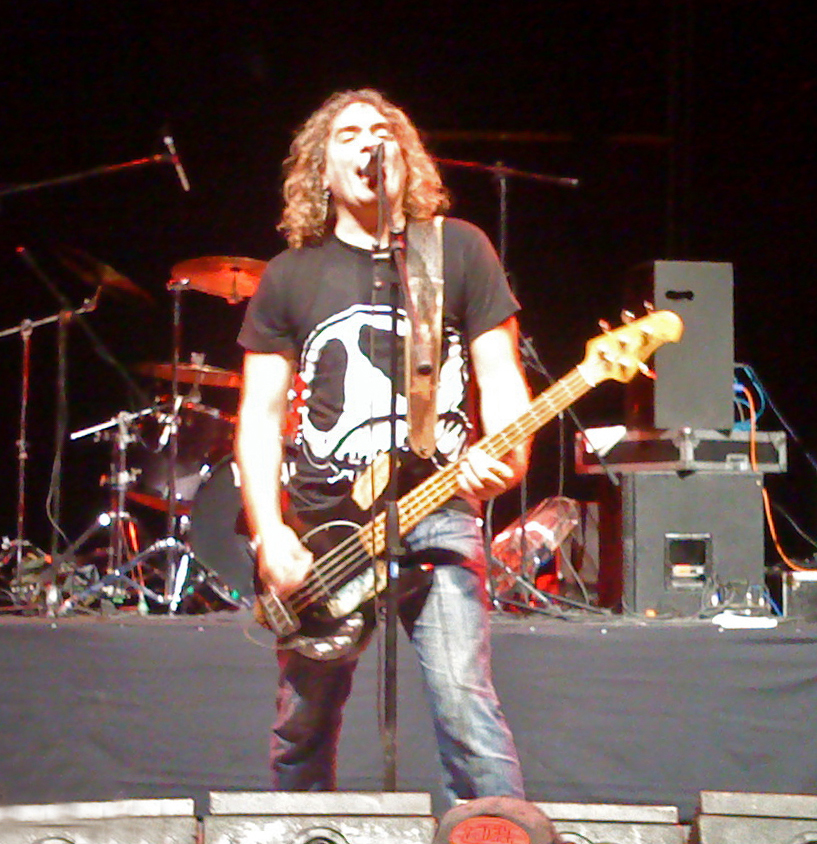
- Fernando Madina performing with Reincidentes in 2011

Background information
- Origin: Sevilla, Spain
- Genres: Rock; punk rock
- Years active: 1987–present
- Labels: Locomotive; BMG; Discos Suicidas
- Members: Manuel J. Pizarro Fernández; Fernando Madina Pepper; Juan M. Rodríguez Barea; Javi Chispes
- Past members: Finito de Badajoz; José Luis "Selu" Nieto
- Website: reincidentes-sca.es

Reincidentes is a Spanish rock/punk rock band. They were formed in the 1980s as Incidente Local, by Manuel Pizarro on drums, Juan Barea on guitar, and Fernando Medina on bass and vocals. They performed their first live concert in 1987 at University of Seville. After they became finalists at a local rock contest and were joined by sax player José Luis Nieto, they recorded their self-titled debut album in 1989 released by '"Discos Trilita". After signing up to the "Discos Suicidas" label and participating in Seville Expo '92, they started touring Central America. Later, Selu left the band and Finito de Badajoz became the new guitarist. In 1997, the band signed to BMG and shortly thereafter their live album Algazara became their first gold record in Spain in 2000.

== History ==
Reincidentes came into being through the Sevillian rock band Incedente Local, which was active their city's music scene between 1985 and 1986. Later on, its members became involved in the student protests of 1987, playing at the University of Seville, that had been occupied by students.

After this, Reincidentes recorded at Juanjo Pizarro's studios. The demo that came out of the studio was used to participate in a rock concert promoted by Seville's Deputation in 1989, where they were finalists.

Since then, Reincidentes has grown and developed their personality, turning into one of the most social rock bands in Andalucia and Spain.

Their most known songs are Andalucía entera (dedicated to the village, Marinaleda), La historia se repite, Camela-3 (which criticised the manipulation of information, directly attacking the TV station Antena 3), Vicio, Hablando con mi cerebro, Un pueblo (about the basque conflict, with the collaboration of Fermín Muguruza) and Ay Dolores (dedicated to women that suffered from domestic abuse, which includes a flamenco chorus).

Their work is a reflection of their left-wing ideology, shown in songs such as Sáhara adelante (supporting Western Sahara), México levanta (in support of the Zapatista movement), La republicana (in support of the Spanish Republic), and Resistencia (supporting the Cuban Revolution). Some of their songs, such as Andaluces Levantaos (a version of the Andalusian anthem) and Jornaleros andaluces, address Andalusian topics. On their album América: canciones de ida y vuelta, they cover various bands and Latin-American solo artists, a variety of them identifying with protest music and left-wing ideas. The group has participated in numerous editions of the historic PCE party.

Reincidentes are not only against not pirating in the music industry, but are in favour of it, describing it as "very beneficial" for musicians and authors, believing that less known and less commercial bands can reach a broader audience. This makes setting up concerts a much easier task, which in their opinion is where musicians really make money.

== Band members ==
- Manuel J. Pizarro Fernández – drums
- Fernando Madina Pepper – bass, vocals
- Juan M. Rodríguez Barea – guitar, vocals
- Javi Chispes – guitar, vocals

== Discography ==
- Reincidentes. Discos Trilita, 1989, reedited by Discos Suicidas.
- Ni un paso atrás. Discos Suicidas, 1991.
- ¿Dónde está Judas? Discos Suicidas, 1992.
- Sol y Rabia. Discos Suicidas, 1993.
- Nunca es tarde... si la dicha es buena. Discos Suicidas, 1994.
- Materia Reservada. Discos Suicidas, 1997.
- ¡Te lo dije!. BMG Ariola/RCA, 1997.
- Los Auténticos. Discos Suicidas, 1998.
- Algazara, BMG Ariola/RCA, 1998.
- ¿Y ahora qué? BMG Ariola/RCA, 2000.
- La otra orilla. La otra orilla, 2001.
- Cosas de este mundo. Locomotive Music, 2002.
- Acústico. Locomotive Music, 2004.
- El comercio del dolor. Locomotive Music, 2005.
- Dementes. Locomotive Music, 2006.
- América: Canciones de ida y vuelta, Realidad Musical, 2008.
- Tiempos de ira, Maldito Records, 2011.
- Aniversario, 2013.
- Awkan Haciendo hablar Al Silencio, 2015.
- Vergüenza, 2017

== Documentaries ==
- Reincidentes, erre que erre (2013)

== Bibliography ==
- El sol y la rabia: Biografía de Reincidentes by Kike Babas and Kike Turrón. A biography of Reincidentes and an appendix with political texts by Hebe Bodafini and Eva Forest, and prologues by El Cabrero, Fermín Muguruza, and Fito Cabrales.
