= Roberto Iniesta =

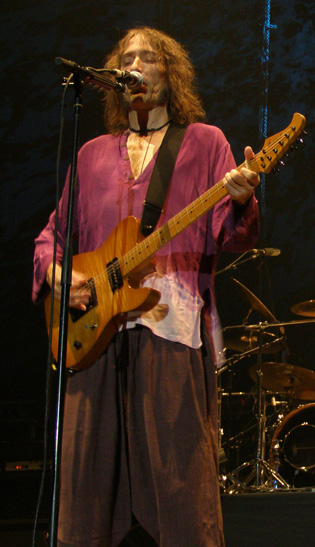
- Iniesta performing 2008

Background information
- Also known as: Robe
- Born: Roberto Iniesta Ojea; 16 May 1962; Plasencia, Spain
- Died: 10 December 2025 (aged 63) Baracaldo, Vizcaya, Spain
- Genres: Hard rock; progressive rock; symphonic rock
- Occupations: Musician; songwriter; novelist
- Instrument: Guitar
- Years active: 1983–2025
- Labels: Avispa; Pasión-Área Creativa; DRO/Warner Music
- Website: Official website

Roberto Iniesta Ojea (Spanish pronunciation: [roˈβeɾtojˈnjesta oˈxe.a]; 16 May 1962 – 10 December 2025), also known as Robe, was a Spanish singer-songwriter and guitarist. He was the frontman of the rock band Extremoduro and was also active as a solo artist.

== Life and career ==
Roberto Iniesta Ojea was born in Plasencia, Spain on 16 May 1962. After having left school with a third-class Baccalaureate, he worked with his father. At the age of twenty, he began writing songs and he formed his first band, Dosis Letal.

In 1987, he formed Extremoduro, the band that brought him fame. They did not have enough money for recording a studio album so they sold tickets that would be exchanged for the album. When they sold 250 tickets, they had earned enough money to afford the recording. In January 1989, they started the recording of their first demo tape. The distribution of the demo tape began to attract attention inside and outside their home region of Plasencia; it was so well received that the Catalan television program Plastic invited them for a live performance.

In 1996, he shot to fame in Spain due to the release of Agila. That same year, he received the news of the death of his father. The entrance to the band of guitarist and producer Iñaki "Uoho" Antón, at that time belonging to rock and roll band Platero y Tú, was a turning point in the history of the band. They toured along with Platero y Tú that year.

He also joined Fito Cabrales (from Platero y Tú), Iñaki Antón to form the supergroup Extrechinato y Tú. After five years of recording sessions, playing music inspired by lyrics written by urban poet Manolo Chinato, finally the album Poesía Básica was released in 2001.

In 2006, he created the record label Muxik along with Iñaki Antón.

He wrote his first novel, El viaje íntimo de la locura, which was released on 28 September 2009. The novel sold 10,000 copies in just over a week.

Iniesta died on 10 December 2025, at the age of 63, from health complications after suffering a pulmonary embolism in November 2024, forcing him to cancel his tour. The embolism caused a blockage in an artery in his lung due to a blood clot. Following the incident, he announced that he was improving, although he did not set a return date, and focused on his recovery, which required complete rest and medical treatment.

== Discography ==
=== As a solo artist ===
- Lo que aletea en nuestras cabezas (2015)
- Destrozares. Canciones para el final de los tiempos (2016)
- Bienvenidos al temporal (2018) (Live album)
- Mayéutica (2021)
- Se nos lleva el aire (2023)

=== Extremoduro ===
- Rock Transgresivo (1989) (Note: After recording their demo tape Rock Transgresivo in January 1989, they released their first studio album Tú en Tu Casa, Nosotros en la Hoguera. The result left them unsatisfied so the original demo tape was remixed and partially re-recorded and it was released in August 1994 in order to replace the older studio album.)
- Somos unos Animales (1991)
- Deltoya (1992)
- ¿Dónde Están Mis Amigos? (1993)
- Pedrá (1995)
- Agila (1996)
- Iros Todos a Tomar por Culo (1997) (Live album)
- Canciones Prohibidas (1998)
- Yo, Minoría Absoluta (2002)
- Grandes éxitos y fracasos (Episodio primero) (2004) (Compilation album) (Note: Remastered and partially re-recorded.)
- Grandes éxitos y fracasos (Episodio segundo) (2004) (Compilation album)
- La Ley Innata (2008)
- Material Defectuoso (2011)
- Para Todos los Públicos (2013)

=== Extrechinato y Tú ===
- Poesía básica (2001)

== Novels ==
- El víaje íntimo de la locura (2009)
