= WarCry discography =

Spanish power metal band

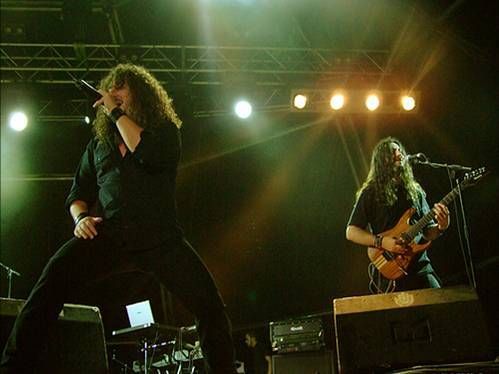
- Studio albums: 11
- Live albums: 2
- Compilation albums: 2
- Video albums: 2
- Music videos: 31
- Demos: 1

WarCry is a Spanish power metal band formed in 2001 after Víctor García and Alberto Ardines were ejected from Avalanch. WarCry has released ten studio albums, one live album, one demo (released in 1997 while being just a side project from the members original bands), and one music video. This list does not include material performed by members or former members of WarCry that was recorded with Avalanch, DarkSun, Relative Silence, Darna, or Sauze.

Self-titled debut album WarCry was released on 17 April 2002. Guitarists Pablo García and Fernando Mon appeared only as guest musicians on the debut album, but became full-time members on 2002 along with keyboardist Manuel Ramil and bassist Alvaro Jardón. Second album El Sello De Los Tiempos was released on 1 December 2002. At the end of 2003, Jardón left the band due to musical and personal issues. On 1 January 2004 was released the third album Alea Jacta Est striking all the music stores around Spain. On the first concert of the tour supporting the album, the band presented Roberto García, formerly of Avalanch, as Jardón's replacement. Their fourth studio album, ¿Dónde Está La Luz?, was released on 1 February 2005, considered by critics "their heaviest album to date". They embarked on a supporting tour throughout Spain. WarCry played a sold-concert in Madrid. That performance was released on 27 February 2006 as a live album, named Directo A La Luz and soon was certified gold. La Quinta Esencia was their fifth album, released on 18 September 2006 with a great acceptance by the fans and the press, taking them to the highest positions on the Spanish charts. Sixth album was set to be released in May/June 2008, but after the lineup changes they pushed it back to September 2008. Víctor García stated that "this album will express much duality in human beings — good and evil."

== Albums ==
=== Studio albums ===
Year	Album details	Peak chart positions
Year	Album details	SPA
2002	WarCry: Released: 17 April 2002; Label: Avispa (AS # 957-02); Format: CD	—
2002	El Sello De Los Tiempos: Released: 1 December 2002; Label: Avispa (AS # 4400-02); Format: CD	—
2004	Alea Jacta Est: Released: 1 January 2004; Label: Avispa (AS # 5138-03); Format: CD	—
2005	¿Dónde Está La Luz?: Released: 1 February 2005; Label: Avispa (AS # 04302-06); Format: CD-DVD	16
2006	La Quinta Esencia: Released: 18 September 2006; Label: Avispa (AS # 56-06); Format: CD-DVD	19
2008	Revolución: Released: 27 October 2008; Label: Estudio Lamiña Producciones; Format: CD-DVD	22
2011	Alfa: Released: 15 April 2011; Label: Estudios Eclipse; Format: CD-DVD	—
2013	Inmortal: Released: 31 July 2013; Label: Estudios Distrito Federal; Format: CD	10
2017	Donde El Silencio Se Rompió...: Released: 29 May 2017; Label: Estudios Distrito Federal; Format: CD	19
2022	Daimon: Released: 21 October 2022; Label: OVNI Estudio; Format: CD	37
2026	Entre La Niebla: Released: 30 October 2026; Label: Jaus Records; Format: CD	55

=== Compilation albums ===
Title	Label	Released
Momentos	Estudios Distrito Federal	17 November 2017
La Voz Dormida	ONE EMPIRE MUSIC	21 July 2020

=== Live albums ===
Year	Album details	Peak chart positions	Certifications (sales thresholds)	Notes
Year	Album details	SPA	Certifications (sales thresholds)	Notes
2006	Directo A La Luz: Released: 27 February 2006; Label: Avispa (AS # 247/06); Format: DVD-CD	1	ESP: Gold	Recorded at Madrid's music hall "Divino Aqualung" on 5 November 2005. The CD only contained a selection of the most successful songs performed in the concert.
2012	Omega: Released: 1 December 2012; Label: Jaus Records (AS # 247/06); Format: DVD-CD	-	ESP:	Recorded at Palacio Vistalegre Madrid on 21 January 2012.

== Music videos ==
Year	Title	Album
2026	"Hoy Gano Yo (en vivo)"	WarCry
2026	"Lo Siento (en vivo)"	Entre La Niebla
2026	"Un Lugar Sin Dios"	¿Donde Está La Luz?
2026	"El Hombre En El Espejo"	Entre La Niebla
2026	"Lo Siento"	Entre La Niebla
2025	"Perdido"	¿Donde Está La Luz?
2025	"El Mas Triste Adiós"	La Quinta Esencia
2025	"Ego"	Daimon
2024	"Orfeo"	Daimon
2024	"Nuevo Mundo"	¿Dónde Está La Luz?
2024	"Cielo e Infierno"	Donde El Silencio Se Rompió
2024	"Un Poco De Fe"	La Quinta Esencia
2024	"Devorando El Corazón"	Revolución
2024	"Alma De Conquistador"	Alfa
2024	"Para Siempre (en vivo)"	Daimon
2023	"Siempre (en vivo)"	Inmortal
2023	"Condenado"	Daimon
2023	"Que Se Vaya"	Daimon
2022	"La Hora De Sufrir"	Daimon
2022	"Solo Se"	Daimon
2017	"Así Soy"	Donde El Silencio Se Rompió
2013	"Quiero Oírte"	Inmortal
2013	"Venganza"	Inmortal
2013	"Venganza" (Vídeo lírico)	Inmortal
2013	"Huelo El Miedo"	Inmortal
2012	"Cobarde (en vivo)"	Omega (DVD)
2006	"Nuevo Mundo (en vivo)"	Directo A La Luz (DVD)
2006	"Luz Del Norte (en vivo)"	Directo A La Luz (DVD)
2006	"Hijo De La Ira (en vivo)"	Directo A La Luz (DVD)
2005	"Contra El Viento"	¿Dónde Está La Luz?
2002	"Dispuesto a Combatir" (Vídeo lírico)	El Sello De Los Tiempos

== Demos ==
Year	Album details	Notes
1997	Demon 97: Released: 1997; Label: Self-produced; Format: Cassette	First work ever recorded by WarCry, which is also their only English effort to date.
