= List of awards and nominations received by WarCry =

WarCry awards and nominations
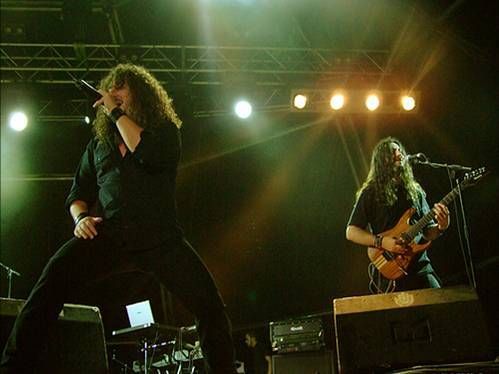
- WarCry at Viña Rock, Valencia, Spain, 2008
Awards and nominations
Award	Wins	Nominations
Radial Awards	11	28
AMAS Awards	4	5
Rockferendum	2	11
MetalZone	4	7

Totals (Note: Certain award groups do not simply award one winner. They acknowledge several different recipients, have runners-up, and have third place. Since this is a specific recognition and is different from losing an award, runner-up mentions are considered wins in this award tally. For simplification and to avoid errors, each award in this list has been presumed to have had a prior nomination.)
- Wins: 21
- Nominations: 51

WarCry is a Spanish power metal band, currently consisting of vocalist Víctor García, guitarists Pablo García and José Rubio, bassist Roberto García, and drummer Rafael Yugueros.

WarCry formed in 2001 when the members Víctor García and former drummer Alberto Ardines were expelled from Avalanch. They released two albums in less than a year and by the third release they had become one of the most important groups on the Spanish metal music scene. After the fourth album critics stated that WarCry is "one of the few bands in the Spanish heavy metal that actually reinvents itself steadily". The band received many awards with their fifth album, and critics said, "Hats off, it's clear that WarCry is one of the best metal bands, not to say the best". They are noted for the use of keyboards, aggressive and fast drumming style, García's high pitched and gravel vocals, and twin-guitar sound. Allmusic's Evan Gutierrez stated that "already well-known throughout Spain, WarCry have begun to gain a reputation among metal enthusiasts throughout Latin America."

== Awards ==
=== Radial Awards ===
==== 2003 ====
Year	Nominated work	Award	Result
2003	WarCry	Revelation Band	Won
2003	WarCry	Best Band In Concert	Nominated
2003	Víctor García	Best Singer	Nominated
2003	Víctor García	Best Composer	Nominated
2003	Víctor García	Funniest Character	Nominated
2003	El Sello De Los Tiempos	Best Album	Nominated
2003	El Sello De Los Tiempos	Best Coverbox	Nominated
2003	"Hoy Gano Yo"	National Song	Nominated
2003	"Capitán Lawrence"	National Song	Nominated
2003	Alberto Ardines	Best Drummer	Nominated
2003	Manuel Ramil	Best Keyboardist	Won
2003	Alvaro Jardón	Best Bassist	Nominated
2003	Pablo García	Best Guitarist	Nominated
2003	Directo A La Luz	Best Concert	Nominated
2003	WarCry.as	Best Website	Won

==== 2004 ====
Year	Nominated work	Award	Result	Position
2004	WarCry	Best Band	Nominated	2nd place
2004	Víctor García	Best Singer	Won	
2004	Pablo García	Best Guitarist	Nominated	3rd place
2004	Roberto García	Best Bassist	Nominated	2nd place
2004	Alberto Ardines	Best Drummer	Nominated	3rd place
2004	Manuel Ramil	Best Keyboardist	Won	
2004	Alea Jacta Est	Best Album	Won	
2004	"El Guardián De Troya"	Best Song	Nominated	2nd Place
2004	WarCry	Best Band in Concert	Won	
2004	Alea Jacta Est	Best Album Coverbox	Nominated	5th Place
2004	WarCry.as	Best Website	Won	

==== 2005 ====
Year	Nominated work	Award	Result
04/06 /2005	Víctor García	Best Singer	Won
04/06 /2005	Alea Jacta Est	Best Album	Won
04/06 /2005	WarCry	Best Band	Won
04/06 /2005	Manuel Ramil	Best Keyboardist	Won
04/06 /2005	WarCry.as	Best Website	Won

=== AMAS Awards ===
Date	Nominated	Award	Result
February 25, 2006	Directo A La Luz	Best Concert	Won
02/17 /2007	Víctor García	Best Singer	Won
02/17 /2007	Roberto García	Best Bassist	Nominated
March 2, 2008	Pablo García	Best Guitarist	Won
March 2, 2008	Rafael Yugueros	Best Drummer	Won

=== Rockferendum ===
Rockferendum is an award held by votes from readers of the magazines Kerrang! and HeavyRock.

Date	Nominated	Award	Result	Position
January 26, 2007	Víctor García	Best Singer	Nominated	2nd place
January 26, 2007	Fernando Mon	Best Guitarist	Nominated	10 first places
January 26, 2007	Directo A La Luz	Best Concert	Nominated	2nd place
January 26, 2007	La Quinta Esencia	Best Album	Won	
January 26, 2007	"Ulises"	Song Of The Year	Nominated	2nd place
January 26, 2007	"Tu Recuerdo Me Bastará"	Song Of The Year	Nominated	3rd Placep
January 26, 2007	Alberto Ardines	Best Drummer	Nominated	2nd Place
January 26, 2007	Roberto García	Best Bassist	Nominated	10 first places
January 26, 2007	La Quinta Esencia	Best Coverbox	Won	
January 26, 2007	Pablo García	Best Guitarist	Nominated	10 first places
January 26, 2007	Manuel Ramil	Best Keyboardist	Nominated	2nd place

=== MetalZone ===
Date	Nominated	Award	Result	Position
January 29, 2007	WarCry	Best Band	Won	
January 29, 2007	"La Vieja Guardia"	Best Song	Nominated	2nd place
January 29, 2007	Directo A La Luz	Best Concert	Nominated	2nd place
January 29, 2007	Manuel Ramil	Best Keyboardist	Won	
January 29, 2007	Pablo García	Best Guitarist	Won	
January 29, 2007	Alberto Ardines	Best Concert	Nominated	3rd place
02/04 /2008	Manuel Ramil	Best Keyboardist	Won	

=== Other ===
- WarCry received a gold certification for the live album Directo A La Luz on September 18, 2006.
- Heavy Metal Radio from Argentina, on August 15, 2007 awarded WarCry "International Band of the Month".
