= Contra El Viento =

Song by WarCry

from the album ¿Dónde Está La Luz?
- Released: 2005
- Length: 4:31
- Label: Jaus/Avispa Music
- Songwriter: Víctor García
- Producers: Víctor García and Alberto Ardines

Contra El Viento (en: "Against the Wind") is the seventh track from WarCry album ¿Dónde Está La Luz?, and was also released as a music video created after a montage of scenes from a live concert given by the band. It is also featured on live album Directo A La Luz on both DVD and CD versions.

== Meaning ==
The lyrics were written entirely by Víctor García, who explained them on the band's website as follows:

I'm sure you all have seen pictures of children in a hospital with their heads shaved, suffering of various types of cancer, with that sad look but at the same time sweet, which tell us that rather than sick, they are just children. There are many other images that show adverse environments in which a human being tries to survive, many cases in which the calculation of possibilities is adverse, but many of them the human ended up victorious.

This story talks about a terminal patient who notices that his time is about to come, and still grasps desperately to his life. It's common to hear expressions like: "If I have an accident and end up blind, I prefer to die", or "If I lose a leg I prefer to die"... Dying, is like total surrender. There might be a life after death, but one thing is totally clear, it won't be the same. The human being is a viscous substance that exists in our heads, everything else is replaceable and complementary. The loss of an organ, vision, or hearing is not a loss of identity, also, your family wouldn't leave you just because you're blind, or anything else, their support and affection will always be present.

Imagine you the protagonist of this story, think of any way of survival, think that every second is vital, and that life is a disease with constant pain and thousands of barriers to whom you need to face. Escaping is not allowed, but only resistance, struggle, and fights to solve problems. At the end of our years death will win, but no one can take away the pleasure of having fought every single day of our lives... against the wind.

== Personnel ==
- Víctor García - vocals
- Pablo García - guitars
- Fernando Mon - guitars
- Roberto García - bass
- Manuel Ramil - keyboards
- Alberto Ardines - drums
