= El Regreso (song) =

Song by WarCry

from the album ¿Dónde Está La Luz?
- Released: 2005
- Length: 4:59
- Label: Jaus/Avispa Music
- Songwriter(s): Víctor García
- Producer(s): Víctor García and Alberto Ardines

"El Regreso" (English: "The Return") is the third track from WarCry's ¿Dónde Está La Luz?. "El Regreso" is a well-known song among the band's fans and one of their most controversial ones due to the lyrics referring to revenge from a son to his alcoholic father who abused of him and his mother. "El Regreso" is featured on live album Directo A La Luz on both DVD and CD versions.

== Personnel ==
=== Band ===
- Víctor García - vocals
- Pablo García - guitars
- Fernando Mon - guitars
- Roberto García - bass
- Manuel Ramil - keyboards
- Alberto Ardines - drums

=== Production ===
- Esteban Casosolas - Sounds
- Simón "Big Simon" Echeverría - Mastering
