= Hoy Gano Yo =

Song by WarCry

from the album WarCry
- Released: 2002
- Length: 6:00
- Label: Jaus/Avispa Music
- Songwriter(s): Víctor García
- Producer(s): Víctor García and Alberto Ardines

Hoy Gano Yo (en: "Today I Win") is the tenth track from WarCry's self titled debut album. It's one of the band's best-known songs, played nearly in every concert often as closing track, due to its lyrics about the way heavy metal is seen in the society. "Hoy Gano Yo" is featured on live album Directo A La Luz on both DVD and CD versions. The song also appears on Finnish music video game Frets on Fire.

== Meaning ==
On the band's official website Víctor García stated that the song talks about heavy metal, and about the "heavies", with a clear message, "one for all and all for one". He said the main purpose of the song is "to appeal for unity" among the metal enthusiasts, stating also that "sometimes total victory is an accumulation of partial victories, like opening a bar to play only metal music [...] to do things to make heavy metal more important in the society."

Hoy Gano Yo makes reference to how ignored is heavy metal on these times, in lyrics like:

El periódico no habló, del grupo que tocó ayer El heavy no interesa Nada en la televisión, esa es su intención Creer que ya no existimos Ya no nos pueden acusar De las drogas y demás, lo saben bien	The newspaper didn't mention the band that played yesterday Heavy metal doesn't interest them Nothing on television, that's their intention To believe we don't exist anymore They can no longer blame us About drugs and such things, they know it well

On the main chorus appears what García said it was an "appeal for unity"

Pero al ponerse el sol Habrá algún concierto Y mi gente allí se reunirá Al ponerse el sol Todas las almas puras Oirán acordes de metal	But at sundown There will be a concert And my people will unite there At sundown All the pure souls Will listen to metal chords

== Personnel ==
- Víctor García - vocals, bass, guitars, keyboards
- Alberto Ardines - drums

with:

- Fernando Mon - guitar solos
- Pablo García - guitar solos
