= Ramón Lage =

Spanish metal musician

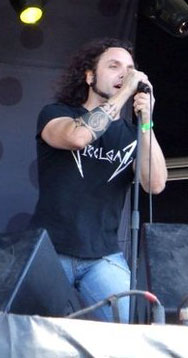
- Ramón Lage in 2010

Background information
- Born: 9 June 1973 (age 53); Oviedo, Asturias, Spain
- Genres: Power metal; Thrash metal; Progressive metal; Rock
- Occupations: Musician; singer
- Instruments: Vocals; guitar

Ramón Lage (born 9 June 1973 in Oviedo, Asturias, Spain) is a Spanish musician, best known for his work as vocalist of power/progressive metal band Avalanch. Currently, he is the vocalist of DELALMA.

== Career ==
Having shown an interest in singing from a very early age, Lage's musical career started in the 90's with the band Arkaes as lead singer and guitarist.

Later, he was recruited as a singer for the band Paco Jones with which he recorded the album "Invisible" in 1999 and performed, until joining Avalanch marked the definitive beginning of his professional career.

In 2006, he was the first vocalist ever to receive one of the official Asturian Music Awards, by winning in the category of Best Singer in the first edition of the AMAS Awards.

As of 2011, he started working as a vocal coach in Asturias, first at Derrame Rock School in Oviedo and later at the M Feeling Center in La Felguera.

His voice has often been described as greatly versatile, easily able to switch "from an aggressive sound to some very calm and very pleasant singing"

=== Avalanch ===
In early 2002 he became the lead vocalist of Avalanch, having already worked with them in the past as a roadie and background vocalist. He is the vocalist who has recorded the most albums with the band, which led him to perform multiple tours in Spain and all around the world.

In parallel, during this era Lage also lent his voice to the bands Stunned Parrots and Geysser, working in both side projects alongside former bandmate Alberto Rionda.

Avalanch entered an indefinite hiatus on 2012 after performing two farewell shows in Mexico supporting Scorpions.

=== Human ===
In February 2013, he was announced as the new vocalist and guitarist for Human, an Asturian thrash metal band he had previously collaborated with.

The following years the band went through some line up changes, and then focused on working on their third studio album; the first one with Lage as a frontman and songwriter.

After a long silence, in 2016 Human announced the return of their original line up for a farewell tour in Asturias and then disbanded.

=== Withdrawal from the stages (2016–2022) ===
In December 2016, Avalanch's leader Alberto Rionda unilaterally announced a comeback with a completely new line up. Shortly after, in February 2017, all the rest of musicians from the previous line up, including Lage, signed an official statement confirming they had not taken part in any decision regarding the band's return.

Acclaimed for the wide versatility of his voice, Lage continues featuring as guest vocalist, backing vocalist, or vocal producer for several bands and projects. He is also engaged in dubbing and audiobook narration.

=== DELALMA ===
In September 2022, a lot of hype was raised when he reappeared publicly as the main vocalist of DELALMA, a supergroup led by the well-known guitarist Manuel Seoane, which includes other renowned musicians such as Manuel Ramil.

== Discography ==
=== With Paco Jones ===
==== Studio albums ====
- Invisible (2000)

=== With Avalanch ===
==== Studio albums ====
- Los poetas han muerto (2003)
- El hijo pródigo (2005)
- Muerte y vida (2007)
- El ladrón de sueños (2010)
- Malefic Time: Apocalypse (2011)

==== English versions/Re-recorded albums/Compilations ====
- Las ruinas del Edén (2004) – Re-recorded old songs.
- Mother Earth (2005) – English version of Los Poetas Han Muerto
- Un paso más (2005) – Greatest hits.
- Del Cielo a La Tierra (2012) – Greatest hits.

==== DVD/Live Albums ====
- Cien Veces (2005)
- Lágrimas Negras (DVD) – (2006)
- Caminar sobre el agua (2CD+DVD) – (2008)

==== Singles ====
- Lucero (2003)
- Las ruinas del Edén (2004)
- Where The Streets Have No Name (2004) – U2 cover
- Alas de cristal (2005)
- Mil motivos (2010)
- Malefic Time: Apocalypse (2012)

=== With Stunned Parrots ===
==== Studio albums ====
- Vol. 1 - Pining for the Fjords (2006)

=== With Geysser ===
==== Studio albums ====
- El hombre sin talento (2010)

=== With Human ===
==== Demos ====
- All Together (2013)
- No More (2014)
- We Are One (2014)

=== With DELALMA ===
==== Studio albums ====
- DELALMA (2023)

== Guest appearances ==
Year	Appearance	Main artist	Album
2000	"Hell Patrol" (Backing vocals)	Avalanch	Metal Gods - Tribute to Judas Priest
2001	Backing vocals	Avalanch	El ángel caído
2003	"Venganza"	Human	Indecission
2003	"Prepotenzia"	Human	Indecission
2003	"Paraíso Perdido I: Éxodo"	Furia Animal	Sentencia Divina
2004	"La Nave Blanca"	Vendaval	Mi Otra Mitad
2008	"Himno del Sporting: Versión rock"	Bras Rodrigo	Sporting: Nunca Irás Solo
2009	"La Cruzada del Miserable"	Amadeüs	Caminos del alma
2009	"Llanto del desierto"	Tendencia	Confidencial
2010	"Ya Te Dije"	Jivaro	Finos Licores
2011	La Mirada Rendida	Heraldicca	Robando el Aire
2012	"Requiem"	Taranus	Taranus
2012	Backing vocals	Jbara	Jadba
2012	"23:59 Pedirle al Sol"	Mysterika	Pedirle al Sol (single)
2012	"Un Solo Corazón"	Ariday	¿Qué Nos Queda?
2014	"Sunset Superman" (Tribute to DIO)	Adgar	Fuente de la Vida Eterna
2014	"Heart of Stone"	Leather Boys	Back In The Streets
2015	"Traición"	Alborea	Alborea: Parte I
2015	"El Puente de las Estrellas"	Alborea	Alborea: Parte I
2015	"Libros Prohibidos"	Oscura Tentación	Cronovisor
2016	Backing vocals	La Destilería	La Fuga y La Furia
2017	"Mamá"	Angelitos Negros	Sanatorio Mental
2018	"Tuareg"	Angelitos Negros	Sanatorio Mental
2018	Backing vocals and vocal production	Angelitos Negros	Sanatorio Mental
2018	"Te debo una canción" (Tribute to Ixo Rai!)	Miguel Barrero	
2019	"Monstruos de Papel"	Omnia Transit	Examen de Conciencia
2019	"Dime Dónde Está Ese Cielo"	Omnia Transit	Examen de Conciencia
2020	(TBA)	Bajel	Nacom
2020	"Nuestros Padres"	Omnia Transit	
2021	"Canto XII - Acto I: Hijos de Medea"	Amadeüs	Black Jack II
2022	"Check In for Death"	Monasthyr	Eterno Linaje
2023	"No seré yo"	Saurom	
