= WarCry (album) =

Studio album by WarCry
- Released: April 17, 2002
- Recorded: 2001–2002
- Genre: Heavy metal; power metal
- Length: 56:42
- Language: Spanish
- Label: Jaus/Avispa
- Producer: Víctor García; Alberto Ardines

WarCry chronology
Demon 97 (1997)	WarCry (2002)	El Sello De Los Tiempos (2002)

Professional ratings
Review scores
Source	Rating
Kerrang!	4/5 stars
Karma	96%
HeavyRock	4.5/6 stars

WarCry is the first full-length album by Spanish power metal band WarCry, released on April 17, 2002 through Avispa Music.

== Overview ==
While working in Avalanch, singer Víctor García and drummer Alberto Ardines decided to release an album with the songs they had composed in their spare time, as those were not accepted in the band. All the songs dealt mostly with epic stories, immortal warriors, and personal experiences. Both members were later expelled from Avalanch, due to be working on a project behind the band's back. They decided create a band as they already had an "open path". The album was produced by themselves; recorded, mixed, and edited in Jaus Records, with cover and graphic design by Ricardo Menéndez (represented by Rick-Art). García handled lead vocal duties, primary lyricist, main songwriter, bassist, rhythm guitarist, and keyboardist, but received the collaboration of Pablo García and Fernando Mon on the guitar solos, who later became full-time members, along with bassist Alvaro Jardón. Jardón didn't work on the album as it had already been recorded. In search of a keyboardist, the band conducted auditions from June 22 to August 12, 2002, recruiting Manuel Ramil. WarCry kept working in a new album before giving a tour, in order to have enough songs to choose from.

Japanese rock magazine Karma catalogued WarCry as "a Spanish album that boosts true metal!". Kerrang! said it was a "very good debut from a very good band that has pleasantly surprised everyone". Rock magazine HeavyRock stated that WarCry was "giving Avalanch a hard time". Spanish music critic Rafa Basa said "WarCry is national [Spain] heavy metal, powerful, direct, and convincing!"

== Track listing ==
All tracks are written by Víctor García.

No.	Title	Length
1.	"Intro" ("Intro")	1:20
2.	"Luz del Norte" ("Northern Light")	5:04
3.	"Quiero" ("I Want")	5:36
4.	"Nadie" ("No One")	4:45
5.	"Pueblo Maldito" ("Cursed Town")	4:52
6.	"Cada Vez" ("Each Time")	4:49
7.	"Señor" ("Lord")	5:41
8.	"Al Salir el Sol" ("At Sunrise")	6:14
9.	"Trono del Metal" ("Metal Throne")	5:21
10.	"Hoy Gano Yo" ("Today I Win")	6:00
11.	"Nana" ("Lullaby")	4:07
12.	"Amanecer" ("Dawn")	2:46
Total length:		56:42

== Personnel ==
=== Musicians ===
- Víctor García – vocals, bass, guitars, keyboards
- Alberto Ardines – drums
- Fernando Mon – guitar solos
- Pablo García – guitar solos

=== Production ===
- David de la Torre – mastering
- Ricardo Menéndez – design
- Romi – photos
