= Simón Echeverría =

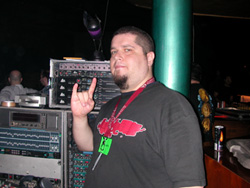
- Big Simon

Background information
- Born: Simón Echeverría Romero; 9 July 1972; Santiago, Chile
- Died: 31 July 2006 (aged 34) Madrid, Spain
- Genres: heavy metal, rock, pop
- Occupation: Record producer
- Years active: 1995–2006

Simón Echeverría Romero, also known as "Big Simon", (9 July 1972 – 31 July 2006) was a Chilean record producer best known for his work with Alejandro Sanz, Amaral, Celtas Cortos, Nacho Vega, Rosana, Joaquín Sabina, Mägo de Oz, Luis Cobos, Saratoga, Los Pecos, Sergio Dalma, Sôber, Stravaganzza, Skizoo, Dark Moor, WarCry, Ebony Ark, Coilbox, Dreamaker, Silver Fist, Miguel Bosé, Terroristars, Infernoise, FreakMind, etc.

== Biography ==
When he was only 2 years old he and his family emigrated to Peru after being exiled by Pinochet's military regime, after a few months they moved to London, where he lived until finishing kindergarten. He arrived to Spain in December 1978.

He began to study, Madrid, computing to 8 years and music at age 10, when it bought his first guitar; later enrolling at the academy Rockservatorio, where he studied guitar, music theory and harmony with Jero Ramiro. His first job in a study audiovisual went to the 15 years since that time did not stop studying and improved, both in music as in computing, until a magnificent career as music producer.

With only 18 years, was Disk-jockey resident of the mythical Chamber Chancellor Madrid, from 1990 to 1993. Later the same activity conducted in another emblematic of local heavy in Madrid, the city of Kas, until 1995. These activities were parallel to his musical studies, and his job as network administrator and computer systems, and responsible for the area of graphics and design company in Madrid Aysav Sad.

His career began as a music producer in the former studies Sintonía Madrid where producers collaborated with national and international as well as with artists and groups like Alejandro Sanz, Amaral, Celtas Cortos, Nacho Vega, Rosana, Joaquín Sabina Mägo de Oz, Luis Cobos, Saratoga, Fish, Sergio Dalma Sôber Stravaganzza Skizoo Dark Moor WarCry, Ebony Ark, Coilbox, Dreamaker, Silver Fist, The Clash, Terroristars, Infernoise, FreakMind, and so on.

He also worked in the world of advertising creating and arranging covers and original jingles for advertisements, was the expert in Dolby Digital 5.1 mixes in the vast number of films that doubled to Disney as well as other titles in the film Spanish.

In recent years served as Free-Lance requested by hard rock and progressive bands, as well as sound technician for direct groups like Dover, Skizoo, Carmen Paris, and so on. He collaborated on two videos at least, to be Happy Today Toca, (curiously interpreting the magician) and Mägo de Oz's "La Posada de los muertos".

As a musician was part of the band Not for Us, which was guitarist and producer, with their debut album in 1999 Methods in Déjà-vuand a year later the album Not for us. In Sôber was charged with keyboards and samplers, Reddo during the tour.

He died in Madrid on July 31, 2006, after cancer pancreatic it discovered a few weeks earlier, when just completed in Murcia the production of new album of Skizoo.

In March 2007 editing a double-disc tribute to Not For Us Urban Dux Terroristars, Stravaganzza Skunk City, Skizoo, Silver Fist, Savia, Melquiades, Mägo de Oz, Kaothic, Infernoise, Zulu Time, Ebony Ark, Dreamaker, Dark Moor, and Basic. A work which includes the song"Y seras cancion" song (written by Txus di Fellatio, from Mägo de Oz) recorded by major artists who collaborated with him throughout his life, all the revenue was given to his family.

== Works ==
=== Music ===
- Hora Zulu - El que la lleva la Entiende (2006) - producer
- Mägo de Oz - Gaia II: La Voz Dormida (2005) - producer
- Dark Moor - Beyond the Sea (2005) - producer
- Skizoo - Skizoo (2005) - mixing and producer
- Skizoo - Incerteza (2006) mixing and producer
- Saratoga - Tierra de lobos (2005) - producer
- Dreamaker - Enclosed (2005) - producer
- Savia - Insensible (2005) - programming
- Stravaganzza - Sentimientos (2005) - producer
- Sergio Dalma - Lo Mejor 1989–2004 (2004) - mastering engineer
- Saratoga - El Clan de la lucha (2004) - producer
- Pecos - Donde Estabas Tu?: 25 Aniversario (2004) - mastering
- TerroriStars - Satanistars (2004) - producer
- WarCry - ¿Dónde Está La Luz?
- Joaquín Sabina - Dímelo en La Calle (2002) - programming
- Andrés Calamaro - El Salmón (2000) - additional recordings
- FreakMind - Six degrees of Separation (2006) - producer

=== Theater ===
- El As - Martin Coiffier (2003) - sound engineer
