= La Quinta Esencia =

Studio album by WarCry
- Released: September 18, 2006
- Recorded: 2006
- Genre: Power metal
- Length: 55:00
- Language: Spanish
- Label: Jaus/Avispa
- Producer: Jaus Records

WarCry chronology
Directo A La Luz (2006)	La Quinta Esencia (2006)	Revolución (2008)

Professional ratings
Review scores
Source	Rating
Metal Symphony	4.5/5 stars

La Quinta Esencia ("The Fifth Element") is the fifth studio album by the power metal band WarCry, released on September 18, 2006, and distributed through Avispa Music. Front man, and lead vocals Víctor García said that this album is a mixture of all the works from their four previous albums.

La Quinta Esencia was the last work to feature drummer Alberto Ardines and guitarist Fernando Mon, who left on August 29, 2007, the reasons remained between the members, as accorded from both sides. They were replaced by Rafael Yugueros, an Asturian heavy metal drummer who had worked for the band on Demon 97, and José Rubio better known as the former guitarist of the band Trilogy.

Later, on February 18, 2008, keyboardist Manuel Ramil left the band due to the distance between his home in Galicia to the rest of the members in Asturias, it was also said that Manuel could only attend to the new album's recording in the studio just a 10% compared to the rest of the members. All three members, along with vocalist Toni Amboaje reunited to form an alternative/power metal band, called Sauze.

== Track listing ==
1. "¡Que vengan ya!" ("[Let Them] Come Now!") – 4:14
2. "Ulises" ("Ulysses" or "Odysseus") – 5:28
3. "Tu Recuerdo me Bastará" ("Your Memory Will Be Enough for Me") – 4:43
4. "La Vieja Guardia" ("The Old Guard") – 4:29
5. "Un Poco de Fe" ("A Little Bit of Faith") – 5:21
6. "El más Triste Adiós" ("The Saddest Good Bye") – 5:31
7. "Buscando Una Luz" ("Looking for a Light") – 5:04
8. "Ha Pasado Su Tiempo" ("His Time Went By") – 4:03
9. "Redención" ("Redemption") – 4:56
10. "Mirando al Mar" ("Staring at the Sea") – 7:18
11. "Más Allá" ("Beyond") – 4:53

== Awards ==
Type	Nominated work	Award	Result	Position
Rockferendum; 2007	La Quinta Esencia	Best Album	Won	1st Place
Rockferendum; 2007	La Quinta Esencia	Best CD Coverbox	Won	1st Place
Rockferendum; 2007	"Ulises"	Song of the Year	Nominated	2nd Place
Rockferendum; 2007	"Tu Recuerdo Me Bastará"	Song of the Year	Nominated	3rd Place
MetalZone 2007	"La Vieja Guardia"	Best Song	Nominated	2nd Place

== Credits ==
=== Band ===
- Víctor García – vocals
- Pablo García – guitars
- Fernando Mon – guitars
- Roberto García – bass
- Manuel Ramil – keyboards
- Alberto Ardines – drums

=== Production ===
- Sergio Blanco – Photos
- Daniel Alonso – Design
