= AMAS Awards =

- Country: Spain
- First award: 2005
- Website: http://www.premiosamas.com/

AMAS (an acronym for Anuario de la Musica de Asturias) Awards is the official music award in Asturias, held every year since 2005. The name translates in English as "Yearbook of the Music of Asturias". Some important Spanish bands, like Avalanch (also Alberto Rionda as singer and composer), WarCry (also Víctor García as singer, Pablo García as guitarist, Rafael Yugueros as drummer), El Sueño de Morfeo have received awards as musical ensemble and in the sub-categories. Some other influential artists, such as Melendi, Feedbacks, among others

== Categories ==
These are the different categories of AMAS awards:

- Revelation Band
- Best Singer
- Best Guitarist
- Best Bassist
- Best Keyboardist
- Best Drummer
- Best Folk Song
- Best Song (other scenes)
- Best Rock Song
- Best Rock-Pop Song
- Best Composer
- Best Producer
- Best Folk Album
- Best Hip-Hop Album
- Best Album (other scenes)
- Best Rock Album
- Best Rock-Pop Album
- Best Piper (new values)
- Best Performer (other instruments)
- Best Lyricist
- Best Soundtrack of Asturian Short Film.
- Best Concert
- Best Album Cover
- Best Music Video
- Award of Honor
