= ¿Dónde Está La Luz? =

Studio album by WarCry
- Released: February 1, 2005
- Recorded: 2004; M-20 Studios in Madrid, Spain
- Genre: Heavy metal power metal
- Length: 50:31
- Language: Spanish
- Label: Jaus/Avispa
- Producer: Víctor García; Alberto Ardines

WarCry chronology
Alea Jacta Est (2004)	¿Dónde Está La Luz? (2005)	Directo A La Luz (2006)

Professional ratings
Review scores
Source	Rating
Rolling Stone	4/5 stars
El Gráfico	favorable
Metal Storm	7.5/10 stars
Metal Symphony	9.5/10 stars

¿Dónde Está La Luz? (English: Where Is The Light?) is the fourth studio album by power metal band WarCry, released on February 1, 2005, and distributed through Avispa Music.

¿Dónde Está La Luz? was recorded in the M-20 Studios in Madrid. Roberto García left Avalanch after the release of El Ángel Caído due to personal and professional problems with Alberto Rionda. He had always worked as guitarist, but WarCry needed a bassist after Jardón's departure at the end the band's last concert from El Sello De Los Tiempos Tour, so he decided to handle bass duties in order to become a member. The album was released in digipak format, as a CD-DVD. The DVD contained a music video of the song "Contra El Viento", an interview with the band members, some of the recording sessions in the studio, and more. All the songs were composed by frontman, lead singer, and songwriter Víctor García.

The album was well received by critics and mostly by fans, being considered as "WarCry's heaviest album to date" (the previous ones were power metal). The lyrics of this work deal with agony, fantasy, but most of all, with social issues, such as abuse, crime, and discrimination.

The ¿Dónde Está La Luz? Tour supported the album, from which was released Directo A La Luz, a recording of a concert in Madrid on November 5, 2005. This live album had a great reception by critics and fans. It was soon certified gold and reached number 1 in the Spanish chart of DVD sales, staying in a high position for many weeks.

== Track listing ==
=== CD ===
All tracks are written by Víctor García.

No.	Title	English translation	Length
1.	"Nuevo Mundo"	New World	4:49
2.	"El Anticristo"	The Antichrist	5:14
3.	"El Regreso"	The Return	4:59
4.	"Perdido"	Lost	5:22
5.	"Hacia el Infierno"	To Hell	4:31
6.	"El Amor de Una Madre"	A Mother's Love	4:56
7.	"Contra el Viento"	Against the Wind	4:31
8.	"En un Lugar sin Dios"	In a Place without God	5:24
9.	"Tu Ausencia"	Your Absence	4:43
10.	"El Último"	The Last One	6:02
Total length:			50:31

=== DVD ===
1. Interview (García and Ardines talk about the album's title, theme, etc.)
2. Recording Sessions (scenes of the recording sessions in the studio with every member)
3. Extras:

- "Video" (a montage of scenes from Alea Jacta Est/¿Dónde Está La Luz? Tour with the song "Contra El Viento")
- "Backing Vocals Recording" (Mon and Avalanch's former keyboardist Iván Blanco recording choruses for ¿Dónde Está La Luz?)
- "Mastering" (a video of the mastering by Simón "Big Simon" Echeverría and Esteban Casasolas in Madrid, Spain)

4. Credits

== Songs ==
All the information is given by Víctor García on their website, where he commented that "this work is based on the current social reflexions. With my personal involvement in all the songs, where I try to clarify everything that is not so obvious, and a subjectivity that could either match or not your point of view":

- Nuevo Mundo: Talks about the migration in Spain; express emigrants' feelings, how the citizens show rejection to them, who are escaping from war or poverty, trying to find a better life.
- El Anticristo: This song is mainly about rebellion. How the people make decisions in certain circumstances, trying to find what they're looking for, and being prepared to do what decided.
- El Regreso: A controversial song which emphasizes how life is under abuse and mistreatment, long-time used ways to get rid of them; and how the people are losing the ability to think and act correctly.
- Perdido: Talks of a person who suffers of amnesia, tries to find out his past and where is he coming from. Makes emphasis on how he wastes his time searching for the origin of life, rather than living it.
- Hacia El Infierno: A normal person is now a prisoner in a cold cell for having committed a crime, trying to end up the situation he was going through. Also shows that sometimes the decisions we make are not the best ones and need to think more before acting.
- El Amor De Una Madre: Talks of a mother who applies euthanasia to her paraplegic son, and who is sentenced by law who took it as "convenience", instead of "pity". It shows how big is a mother's love who sacrifices herself to give peace to her child.
- Contra El Viento: The song is mainly about how human beings try to survive when death is closer than life itself. There're many people who prefer to die instead to see themselves without an organ, while the suffering ones prefer giving almost everything just to live.
- En Un Lugar Sin Dios: Talks about those states of nervousness and at the same time parsimonious called dreams, how real they are; and how could it feel to be a witness and the main character of a burial.
- Tu Ausencia: Tries to transmit how people feel after having fallen in love with someone and now being left alone, that internal chaos in our soul after a break up.
- El Último: One day you wake up and see you're the last person in the world, don't need to worry about anything, you're totally free; but how much damage may cause to you that loneliness.

== Credits ==
=== Band ===
- Víctor García – vocals
- Pablo García – guitars
- Fernando Mon – guitars, backing vocals
- Roberto García – bass
- Manuel Ramil – keyboards
- Alberto Ardines – drums

=== Collaborations ===
- Iván Blanco – backing vocals

=== Production ===
- Esteban Casosolas — sounds
- Big Simon — mastering
- Sergio Blanco — photos
- Ricardo Menéndez (Rick-Art) — design

== See also ==
- 2005 in music
- 2005 in heavy metal music
