= Triple A-Metal =

Spanish record label

- Logo
- Founded: 2007
- Genre: Heavy metal
- Location: Asturias, Spain
- Official website: TripleA-Metal.as

Triple A-Metal is a record company, recording studio, and also the name of its webpage, created and directed by Alberto Ardines from Sauze (former WarCry and Avalanch drummer).

== Information ==
Triple A-Metal was created in 2007 to support and help new Spanish bands who play heavy metal (and its subgenres), "trying to give an opportunity to those bands who had just entered in the world of music", as said by Ardines.

The webpage shows the bands they're working with and their works, also publicizes everything related to Ardines within the music, such as his avatars as record producer, technician, mastering and mixing, etc..

== See also ==
- Sauze
- Hard Spirit
