= El ángel caído (album) =

El Ángel Caído

Studio album by Avalanch
- Released: 2001
- Recorded: June to December 2000
- Genre: Power metal Heavy metal
- Label: Avispa
- Producer: Alberto Rionda

Avalanch chronology
| Llanto De Un Héroe (1999) | El Ángel Caído (2001) |

El Ángel Caído is the third studio album by the Spanish Power metal band Avalanch and the last one featuring Víctor García, released in 2001. It features the collaboration of Leo Jiménez (from Saratoga and Stravaganzza).

== Track listing ==
All tracks written by Alberto Rionda

1. "Hacia la luz" ("To The Light")
2. "Tierra de nadie" ("No Man's Land")
3. "El ángel caído" ("The Fallen Angel")
4. "Xana"
5. "La buena nueva" ("The Good News")
6. "Levántate y anda" ("Get Up and Go")
7. "Alma en pena" ("Cursed Soul")
8. "Corazón negro" ("Black Heart")
9. "Delirios de grandeza" ("Delusions of Grandeur")
10. "Antojo de un Dios" ("Whim of A God")
11. "El séptimo día" ("The Seventh Day")
12. "Las ruinas del Edén (Acto I)" ("The Ruins of Eden (Act I)")
13. "Las ruinas del Edén (Acto II)" ("The Ruins of Eden (Act II)")
14. "Las ruinas del Edén (Acto III)" ("The Ruins of Eden (Act III)")
15. "Santa Bárbara" ("Saint Barbara")

== Personnel ==
- Víctor García - vocals
- Francisco Fidalgo - bass
- Alberto Rionda - lead guitar
- Roberto García - rhythm guitar
- Alberto Ardines - drums
- Iván Blanco - keyboards

=== Collaborations ===
- Leo Jiménez - vocals on "Las Ruinas del Edén, Acto II"
- Chorus by: Víctor García, Iván Blanco, Alberto Rionda, Ramón Lage, Marcos Cabal, Leo Jiménez, Tina Gutiérrez
- Omar Bouza - percussion
- Edel Pérez - percussion
