= El Regreso =

El Regreso or El regreso may refer to:

- El Regreso (film), a 1950 Argentine film
- El Regreso (album), a 2005 live album by Andrés Calamaro
- "El Regreso" (song), a 2005 song by WarCry
- El regreso (TV series), a 2013–2014 Chilean telenovela
- The Return (2013 film) (Spanish: El regreso), a Venezuelan drama
