= Alea Jacta Est (album) =

Studio album by WarCry
- Released: January 1, 2004
- Recorded: 2003
- Genres: Heavy metal; power metal; progressive metal
- Length: 58:22
- Language: Spanish
- Label: Jaus/Avispa
- Producers: Víctor García; Alberto Ardines

WarCry chronology
El Sello De Los Tiempos (2002)	Alea Jacta Est (2004)	¿Dónde Está La Luz? (2005)

Singles from Alea Jacta Est
- 1. "El Guardián de Troya" Released: 2004; 2. "Sin Tu Voz" Released: 2004

Professional ratings
Review scores
Source	Rating
HeavyRock	4/5 stars
Metal Symphony	favorable

Alea Jacta Est (en: "The Die Is Cast") is the third studio album by the Asturian power metal band WarCry, released on January 1, 2004, (see 2004 in music and 2004 in heavy metal music) and distributed through Avispa.

== Overview ==
Alea Jacta Est was mastered in the M-20 Studios in Madrid by Francisco Martínez, produced by Víctor and Alberto, and co-produced by Slaven Kolak. Esteban Casasolas mixed it in Jaus Records where was also edited, and the graphic design ran by Ricardo Menéndez. the first album to feature writing contributions from all the band members (excluding Ardines and Mon), turning all the music and lyrics more introspective.

The album was the last work by the band to include the bass guitarist Alvaro Jardón, who left after the last concert for El Sello De Los Tiempos tour at Sala Quattro in Avilés, leaving a communiqué on the band's website: "For personal and musical reasons, I have decided to leave WarCry. I would like to thank those who have supported me during these years and those who bought the discs in which I participated. I hope we meet again in future projects." The rest of the members said they respected his decision, and Alvaro's work on WarCry would always be a part of the band history.

Ttwelve days after its release, the album reached #3 in the Fnac's list of sales, competing with albums from all musical styles. It also had a great reception, with critics that have prized this work. A month later, Víctor García and Manuel Ramil won the prizes as best vocals and keyboard player respectively, in the Radial Awards, celebrated in Spain.

Alea Jacta Est Tour, the tour to support the album, started on March 5, 2004, and lasted more than seven months, playing with bands like DarkSun, Abyss and Transfer. On the first concert of the tour, WarCry made the official presentation of Jardón's replacement, Roberto García who had left Avalanch due to personal and professional problems with Alberto Rionda. He mainly played the guitar, but in order to become a member he decided to play bass guitar.

== Track listing ==
All tracks composed by Víctor García, except where noted.

1. "El Guardián de Troya" ("The Guardian of Troy") – 6:06
2. "Iberia" ("Iberia") – 5:19
3. "Despertar" ("Awakening") (Pablo García) – 5:36
4. "Lamento" ("Cry") (Alvaro Jardón) – 4:57
5. "Sin tu voz" ("Without Your Voice") – 5:59
6. "Aire" ("Air") – 5:23
7. "Junto a Mí" ("Next to Me") (Music: Pablo, Manuel; Lyrics: Pablo García) – 4:47
8. "Espíritu de Amor" ("Spirit of Love") – 5:13
9. "Fe" ("Faith") (Manuel) – 7:13
10. "Reflejos de Sangre" ("Reflections of Blood") (Pablo, Manuel) – 7:49

== Personnel ==
=== Musicians ===
- Víctor García – vocals
- Manuel Ramil – keyboards
- Alvaro Jardón – bass guitar
- Fernando Mon – guitars
- Pablo García – guitars
- Alberto Ardines – drums

=== Production ===
- Carlos Rodríguez – photos
- Ricardo Menéndez – design
- Slaven Kolak – co-production
- Esteban Casasolas – mix
- Francisco Martínez – mastering
