= A morir =

A morir (Spanish "till death") may refer to:

- A morir (Américo album), album by Chilean singer Américo 2008
- A morir (es), album by Spanish heavy metal band Saratoga (band), 2003
- A Morir (es), album by Argentine band Catupecu Machu, 1998
