= Ready to the Glory =

EP by Avalanch
- Released: 1993
- Genre: Power metal
- Label: Vudu Records

Avalanch chronology
Ready to the Glory (1993)	La Llama Eterna (1997)

Ready to the Glory is an EP by the power metal band Avalanch, released in 1993 under the record label Vudu Records. From that recording was only saved to be used on "La Llama Eterna" the song Excalibur.

== Track listing ==
1. Intro (0:40)
2. Misery (3:32)
3. Ready to the Glory (4:38)
4. Red Night (4:08)
5. Vencer (3:00)
6. Excalibur (4:40)
7. Strangers in the night (5:34)
8. Treat them fine (3:44)
9. The wink of the Moon (04:08)

== Personnel ==
- Juan Lozano - vocals
- Juan Ángel Aláez - Guitar
- Javier de Castro - Guitar
- Charly García - Bass
- Alberto Ardines - Drums
