= Álvaro Jardón =

Spanish bassist (born 1977)

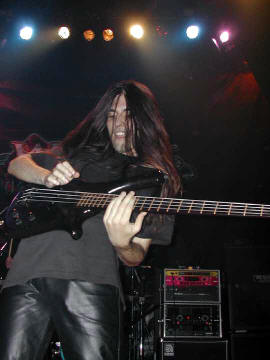

Background information
- Born: November 13, 1977 (age 48); Oviedo, Asturias, Spain
- Genres: Power metal
- Instruments: Bass, vocals
- Years active: 1992–2004
- Label: Avispa

Álvaro Jardón (born November 13, 1977, in Oviedo, Asturias) is a Spanish bassist, who played in the Power metal bands WarCry and Darna.

== Career ==
In 1997, when Jardón was 19, he met Víctor García and joined him to form part of WarCry. The next year, after their recording of the album "Llanto De Un Héroe", Víctor left to be a part of Avalanch. Warcry was unsuccessful after Victor left, so a year later Jardón joined Darna.

They recorded their self-titled debut album "Darna" in May 2001. After working with Darna for three years and sharing the stage with bands like Dark Moor and Ñu, Víctor García asked him to join WarCry once again. They rejoined and recorded their second album, "El Sello De Los Tiempos".

== Discography ==
=== Darna ===
- Darna (2002)

=== WarCry ===
- 2002 — El Sello De Los Tiempos
- 2004 — Alea Jacta Est
