= El Estepario Siberiano =

Spanish drummer (born 1996)

- Born: Jorge Garrido; Valencia, Spain
- Genres: Heavy metal; progressive metal; rock
- Occupations: Musician; content creator
- Instrument: Drums
- Years active: 2013–present
- Member of: The Cost
- Formerly of: Saratoga; Residente
- Website: www.elestepariosiberiano.com

Jorge Garrido, known professionally as El Estepario Siberiano, is a Spanish drummer and content creator. He is a former member of the Spanish metal band Saratoga (2020–2023), and he has toured with the Puerto Rican rapper Residente. He plays with the metal band the Cost.

Garrido has gained recognition for his drumming technique, particularly his speed and one-handed drumming capabilities, which have been profiled in publications such as Modern Drummer and Metal Hammer. In 2023 and 2024, he was recognized by Drumeo in their annual awards.

== Early life ==
Garrido was born in Valencia, Spain. He began playing drums at a young age, citing influence from rock and metal genres. Before achieving professional prominence, he worked as a drummer in various local orchestras and cover bands in Spain to support his musical career.

== Career ==
=== Saratoga (2020–2023) ===
Garrido entered the Spanish metal scene in 2020, when he replaced Dani Pérez as the drummer for the Spanish metal band Saratoga. He performed on the band's 30th-anniversary tour and is featured on the live album 22/10/22... La historia continúa, recorded at La Riviera in Madrid. Garrido announced his departure from the band in March 2023, citing the desire to focus on his health as well as personal projects.

=== The Cost and Residente (2024–present) ===
Following his departure from Saratoga, in 2023, Garrido formed the band the Cost with vocalist Peter Connolly and bassist Chris Attwell. They released the singles "Not for Me" and "Into the Drone" in 2024. That year, Garrido also joined the live touring band for Puerto Rican rapper Residente. Garrido performed internationally with Residente, including a concert at the Zócalo in Mexico City, attended by approximately 180,000 people.

=== Online presence and tutorials ===
Garrido maintains a significant online presence, where he publishes drum covers, tutorials, and demonstration videos. He is noted for his complex "one-handed" drumming arrangements of songs by bands such as Slipknot and Avenged Sevenfold.

His educational content and technical skills have led to repeated recognition by the online drumming education platform Drumeo. He won the "Drummer of the Year" award (Internet/Social Media category) in 2023 and Drummer of the Year in 2024.

== Style and influences ==
Garrido uses a matched grip and is known for high-speed kick drum techniques and linear drumming. He has publicly discussed his rigorous practice routine, which often involves playing for several hours daily to maintain endurance. He is an endorser of Pearl Drums, Meinl Percussion, and Evans Drumheads.

== Discography ==
=== with Saratoga ===
- 22/10/22... La historia continúa (2023)

=== with the Cost ===
- "Not for Me" (2024)
- "Into the Drone" (2024)
- "Her Eyes" feat. Serj Tankian (2024)
- Doppler Affection (2025)

== Awards and nominations ==
Year	Award	Category	Result
2023	Drumeo Awards	YouTube Drummer of the Year	Won
2024	Drumeo Awards	Drummer of the Year	Won
