= El Sello De Los Tiempos =

El Sello de los Tiempos

Studio album by WarCry
- Released: 1 December 2002
- Recorded: 2002
- Genre: Power metal
- Length: 54:50
- Language: Spanish
- Label: Jaus/Avispa
- Producer: Víctor García; Alberto Ardines

WarCry chronology
WarCry (2002)	El Sello de los Tiempos (2002)	Alea Jacta Est (2004)

El Sello de los Tiempos (en: "The Seal of Times") is the second studio album by the Spanish power metal band WarCry, released on December 1, 2002 (see 2002 in music and 2002 in heavy metal music) through Avispa Music. This album is considered to be their first effort as a band, because all the musicians appeared as full-time members, and contributed to the composition, arrangements, and recording of the album.

It had a great reception in Spain and the band won several metal music awards. Víctor García had stated they would release a second album before touring, in order to have a larger repertoire to perform, El Sello De Los Tiempos tour was the tour supporting the album.

== History ==
Just some weeks before WarCry's release Alvaro Jardón, previously of Darna, was hired as the official bassist. In mid-2002 WarCry began recording a new album, with the idea to release it at the end of the year. As Víctor handled keyboard duties on the first album, the band decided to recruit a full-time member to cover that position. They held the auditions from June to August 2002, finally deciding on Galician keyboardist Manuel Ramil. The album was produced by Víctor and Ardines, and recorded, mixed, and edited in Jaus Records. In November 2002, started the album-mastering and manufacturing by David de la Torre, in the M20 Studios in Madrid. Luis Royo, represented by Norma Editorial, was the graphic artist who drew the album cover. Carlos Rodriguez took the promotional shot and the album's back cover. Ricardo Menéndez, represented by Rick-Art, worked on the graphic design and DTP.

El Sello De Los Tiempos Tour started on 13 December 2002, extending for a whole year, where they played with many important bands in the Spanish heavy metal, such as Saratoga, Barón Rojo, Hamlet, Sôber, ending with a final concert in Avilés on 13 December 2003 where Alvaro Jardón left WarCry stating that the reasons were all due to musical and personal issues, thanking his bandmates and fans for everything, and hoping to return to music in upcoming years. On the same communicate the rest of the members said they respected his decision, and his work on WarCry would always be a part of the band history.

== Reception ==
Professional ratings
Review scores
Source	Rating
Kerrang!	link
Metal Hammer	favorable link
Rock Hard	link

Probably due to that all of the members appeared as an entire part of the band, contributing with new ideas, this work received better critics than self-titled debut album. Mariano Munieza from Rock Hard said "the sound is basically European heavy metal, such as Stratovarius, Rage, Blind Guardian, Helloween, Iron Maiden... that is WarCry's musical basis". Kerrang! stated that "the band led by García and Ardines has demonstrated with this record that overcoming and improving is possible". Radio program "Derrame Rock" chose the "Top Ten Metal Albums" of the year, El Sello De Los Tiempos appeared on the list among works such as HammerFall's Crimson Thunder, Avantasia's Metal Opera Pt. II, Dio's Killing the Dragon, and Korpiklaani's Shamániac.

Rock music magazine HeavyRock awarded WarCry "band of the year". Rock Circus chose El Sello De Los Tiempos their "Album of the Month". On the third edition of the Radial Awards, celebrated in 2003, each of the members, the album, and the official website were nominated, making it a total of 15 categories, where they won 3 ("revelation band", "best keyboardist", and "best website").

== Track listing ==
All tracks are written by Víctor García, except 1 and 11 by Manuel Ramil.

No.	Title	Length
1.	"El Sello de los Tiempos (Instrumental)" ("The Seal of Times (Instrumental)")	0:54
2.	"Alejandro" ("Alexander")	5:35
3.	"Hijo de la Ira" ("Child of the Rage")	5:05
4.	"Capitán Lawrence" ("Captain Lawrence")	5:47
5.	"Tú mismo" ("Yourself")	4:37
6.	"Un mar de estrellas" ("A Sea of Stars")	6:54
7.	"Un lugar" ("A Place")	5:01
8.	"Dispuesto a Combatir" ("Willing to Fight")	5:25
9.	"Vampiro" ("Vampire")	7:00
10.	"Hacia Delante" ("(Going) Forward")	6:39
11.	"Renacer" ("Reborn")	1:50
Total length:		54:50

== Credits ==
- Víctor García – vocals
- Fernando Mon – guitars
- Pablo García – guitars
- Alvaro Jardón – bass
- Manuel Ramil – keyboards
- Alberto Ardines – drums

=== Production ===
- David de la Torre – Mastering
- Ricardo Menéndez – Design
- Carlos Rodriguez – Photos
