= Silver Fist =

Spanish thrash/speed metal

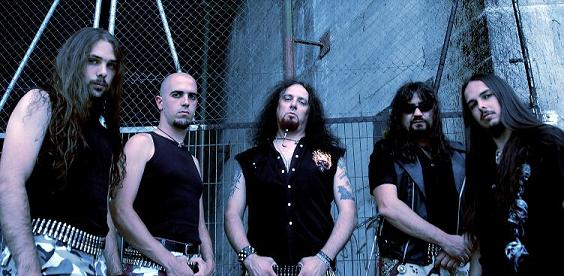

Background information
- Origin: Spain
- Genres: Thrash metal, speed metal
- Years active: 2002–present
- Labels: Avispa Music
- Members: Silverio Solórzano; Erik Raya; Carlos Garcia "Legolas"; Nacho de Carlos; Alex Escorza; Ismael Filtho
- Website: silverfistmetal.com

Silver Fist is a Spanish thrash metal/speed metal band founded in 2002. Some of their riffs are near to melodic death metal.

== Biography ==
- After the separation of Muro, his singer Silver decides to form a new band at the end of 2002 with the name Silver Fist along with the ex-drummer of Muro Iván Manzano with the clear idea to practice pure and direct Heavy Metal.

Soon they begin to compose and to play emphasizing the concerts in the Aqualung club of Madrid opening like guests of Saratoga the day of the recording of its live DVD, with Mötorhead and in the Viña Rock festival (2003 and 2005).

They joined the Spanish label Avispa and in October 2003 record their very first album "Ave Fénix" in the M-20 studios, released in April 2004, and that includes 1 CD with 11 own songs and a second CD with 6 versions of classic bands of the Heavy Metal like Black Sabbath, Savatage or Slayer.

Shortly after Diego Lopez (guitar) and Jose M. Perez (bass) join the band. In September 2004 they record the subject "Killer of Giants" for the album tribute to Ozzy Osbourne "Tribute to Madman" devised and produced by Jorge Escobedo (Sober, Skizoo), idea that took to the band to participate in the festival Viña Rock 2005 under the name of "The Mad Ones" with other musicians who participated in this tribute album (Antonio Bernardini and Jorge Escobedo (Sober, Skizoo) on the guitars, Oscar Sancho (Lujuria) voice, Enrik Garcia guitar and Alfred Romero voice (Dark Moor) and David Martinez, keyboards.

During the year 2005 they begin to compose great part of which will be the second album of Silver Fist and playing in several Spanish festivals as the baptism of Rockzinante Excalibur Metal Festival that took place in Alcala de Henares (Madrid) together with Saratoga, Baron Rojo and Medina Azahara.

The 2006 being a great year for the band, accompany in January Saratoga in Madrid in the presentation by its last album and in April presenting "Ave Fenix" live, also in Madrid, and with great participation of its followers, later to stay in Germany on the 6th edition of the festival Keep It True where they share stage with bands like Exciter, Paradox, Ross the Boss, Grim Reaper, Riot... very being valued between the public who 2 times a year meets for this festival, which also served so that at the end of June they return to German lands to another metal event, Thrash Till Death near Hannover.

Festivals like ViñaRock 2006, Leyendas del Rock Festival, Kastañorock, Carabañarock in Madrid, Maizrock in Leon and several more counted with the presence of Silver Fist this year by great part of the country, as well as in clubs of cities like Valladolid, Sevilla, Dos Hermanas, Guadalajara, Avila etc. And already finally, after several delays, the band began the recording of its second album, that will be called "Lágrimas de Sangre", during the months of June and July, that will be released during the final part of this year 2006.

At this moment it is when Nacho Ruiz leaves the band and Pablo Fernandez replaces him, and his first gig with the band is Leyendas del Rock in Mazarrón (Spain) in August.

The 6 November 2006 "Lágrimas de Sangre" was released, pre-produced by Big Simon (Saratoga, Terroristars, Dark Moor), produced and recorded in the M-20 studios of Madrid with David Martinez and Hadrien Fregnac, mixed by Fredrik Nordström and Hendrik Udd in the Fredman Studios (Sweden) and finally mastered by David Martinez. The cover was in charge of Jowita Kaminska (Exodus, Attacker).

The album receives superb reviews by all specialized press in Spain (Metal Hammer, RockHard, etc.), is album of the month in Metalzone.biz and Mariskalrock.com and cover of the HeavyRock magazine of December 2006. The band is right now on its tour 2007 with great amount of gigs in Spain and festivals within the country as Extremusika or Leyendas del Rock Festival or outside like the Metal Thunder Fest in Puerto Rico and the Headbangers Open Air in Germany.

Band on their 2007 tour performed many dates throughout Spain and festivals within the country as Extremusika, legends of Rock or Heavy Metal Heart festival in Valencia where recorded a live DVD of his performance and outside as the Metal Thunder Fest in Puerto Rico and the Headbangers Open Air in Germany. Also ending the recording of "Lágrimas de Sangre" in English which is entitled "Tears of Blood" and is distributed in Europe, Japan and many more countries via Soulfood Music.

In 2008 playing in Athens (Greece) in the Up The Hammers Festival III, getting a good response from the Greek public. In October 2009 Diego, José, Ivan and Paul leave the band leaving a statement on the official website of the Group and in various media. In July 2011 entering new components, Fran Soler and Alex Escorza on guitars, the low Julito component of Muro and Erik stripe battery a young 17-year-old and with a great future behind the drums.

With this formation in METAL LORCA 2011 touch festival in aid of the victims of the earthquake the Murcia town on 11 May of that year and in the give a concert more than outstanding, making it clear the quality that store the components of this new formation, also participate in the fifth edition of the TRIANA METAL FESTIVAL held in Seville on 24 September, after this concert there is the exit of Alex Escorza being replaced by Antonio Pino, ex-Ankhara, with this new addition they act in the room el tren of Granada on 18 February 2012 at 4THE METAL FESTIVAL, alongside bands like DESASTER (Germany) and BAPHOMET´S BLOOD (Italy) among others, the same year played at several festivals including XXV anniversary of LA CABAÑA Uncle ROCK, METAL, HONTORIA and GENET ROCK 2012. After an input and output of musicians group is finally stabilized with the arrival of Carlos G.hernandez "Legolas" (ex-RockWave, ex-Sons Of Carthage) on bass, Nacho de Carlos (Ñú, ex-Ars Amandi, ex-Hebrea, ex-Beethoven R.) on guitar and the return of Alex Escorza (ex-Hateskor, ex-Muro, ex-Crienium) on the other guitar.

== Band members ==
- Silverio Solórzano "Silver" – Vocals
- Erik Raya – Drums
- Carlos Garcia"Legolas" – Bass
- Nacho de Carlos – Lead/Rhythm Guitars
- Alex Escorza – Lead/Rhythm Guitars
- Ismael Filtho – Keyboard

== Discography ==
- Ave Fénix (2004)
- Lágrimas de Sangre (2006)
- Tears of Blood (2007) English version of Lágrimas de Sangre
- Demo(n) MMVIII (Demo) "English" (2008)
- Fe Ciega (2016)

Compilations and tributes

Tribute to a Madman – Ozzy Osbourne – Killer of Giants (2005)
...Y Seras Canción – Tribute to Big Simon – Mártir (2007)

=== DVD ===
- Directo HMH Festival (2008)
