= WarCry (band) =

Spanish power metal band

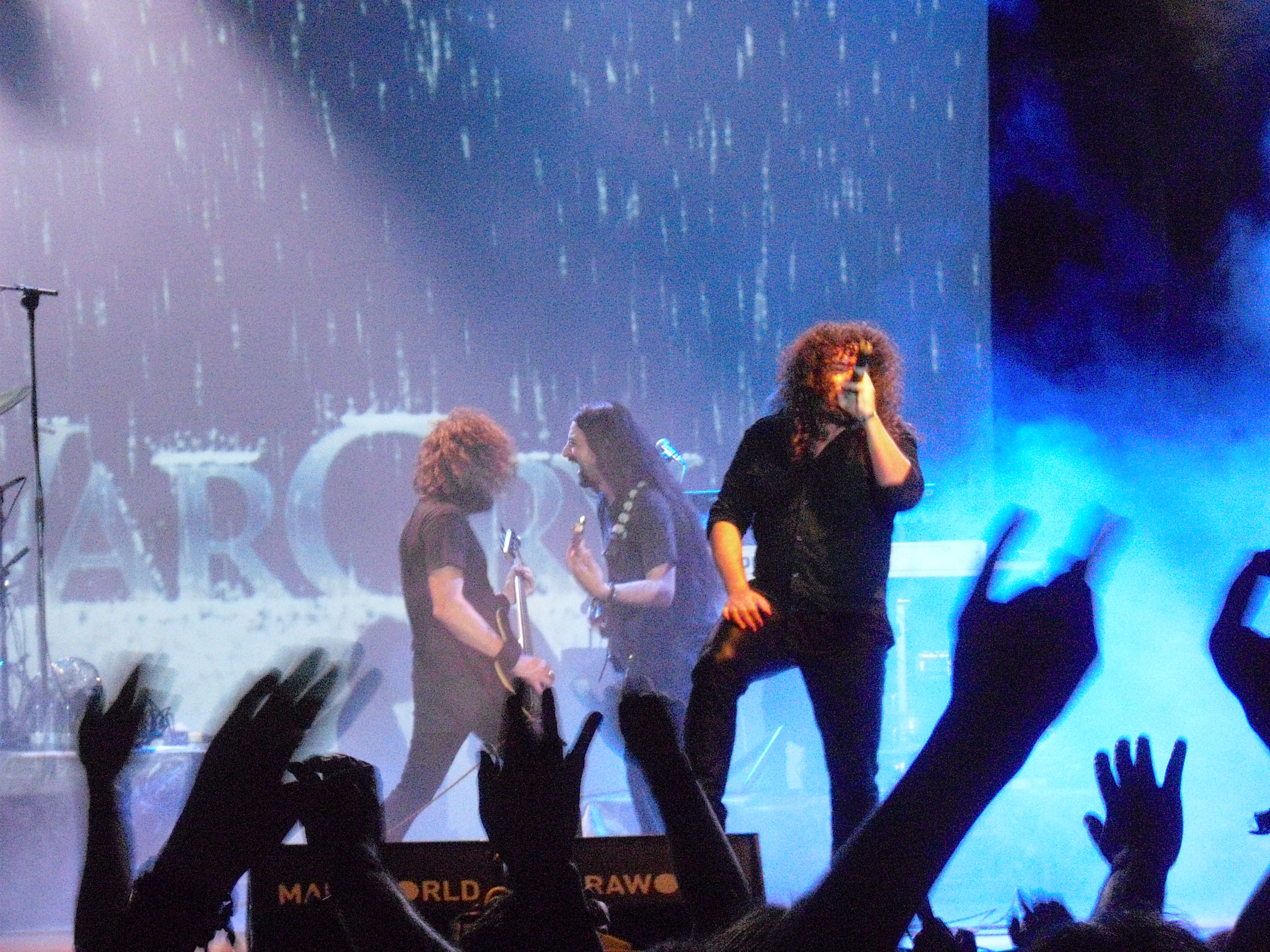
- WarCry performing live at the Costa de Fuego festival in Benicàssim in July 2012

Background information
- Origin: Oviedo, Asturias, Spain
- Genres: Heavy metal, power metal, progressive metal
- Years active: 2001–present
- Label: Jaus/Avispa
- Spinoffs: Sauze
- Spinoff of: Avalanch
- Members: Víctor García; Pablo García; Santi Novoa; Roberto García; Rafael Yugueros
- Past members: Manuel Ramil; Alberto Ardines; Fernando Mon; Álvaro Jardón
- Website: www.warcry.es

WarCry is a Spanish power metal band led by founder, singer, and songwriter Víctor García. Formed in 2001 when García and drummer Alberto Ardines were ejected from Avalanch, the band has since released seven studio albums and two live albums, with an eighth studio album currently in progress. WarCry has had a fluctuating lineup with García as the sole constant member. The band has been acclaimed as one of Spain's most famous heavy metal acts and has won numerous awards in both Spain and Latin America.

== History ==
=== Early days and debut: 2001–2002 ===
In the middle of 2001, while working in Spanish power metal band Avalanch, vocalist Víctor García and drummer Alberto Ardines decided to record an album with the songs they had been composing in their spare time. Most of the songs had been written during the 1990s with lyrics in English. The pair translated the lyrics into Spanish and produced the album themselves, with García singing as well as playing bass guitar, rhythm guitar, and keyboards. Guitarists Fernando Mon, formerly of Avalanch, and Pablo García of Relative Silence also collaborated on the album by recording guitar solos. Upon learning of García and Ardines' project, the other members of Avalanch disapproved of it and expelled them from the band. García has stated that he presented many of his song ideas to Avalanch, but received writing credit on only two released songs: "Aquí Estaré" and "Por Mi Libertad". "Aquí Estaré" had barely been accepted by the band but went on to become one of Avalanch's most popular songs, and so he decided "to release a couple of songs, but never with the idea of leaving Avalanch."

"Señor"
Sample of "Señor" from self-titled debut album WarCry.

"WarCry" had always been Víctor García's idea of a band. In 1992 he formed a band named War-Cry, playing as guitarist, but disbanded it in 1994 when he became the rhythm guitarist for Avalanch. After leaving Avalanch, in February 1996 he reformed the group as WarCry, this time acting as songwriter and lead vocalist. They recorded a demo entitled Demon 97, but disbanded again a year later when Víctor rejoined Avalanch as lead singer. After being expelled from Avalanch, Víctor showed Ardines the name and logo of WarCry. Ardines felt that those were "fantastic", and that they should continue working on their new musical project, as they already had an "open path".

They were joined by Pablo García and Fernando Mon, and recorded their debut album WarCry which was released on 17 April 2002. Shortly after the album's recording they were joined by bassist Álvaro Jardón, formerly of Darna. The album received several positive reviews, with Japanese rock magazine Karma calling it "a Spanish album that boosts true metal!", and Kerrang! declaring it a "very good debut from a very good band that has pleasantly surprised everyone". The band held auditions for a keyboardist in June and August 2002, deciding on Manuel Ramil. Instead of touring in support of WarCry, the band began working on new songs so that they would have a larger repertoire to perform.

=== El Sello de los Tiempos: 2002–2003 ===
WarCry's second album, El Sello De Los Tiempos, was released in December 2002 through Avispa. Kerrang! stated that "the band led by García and Ardines has demonstrated with this record that overcoming and improving is possible". Radial Awards and the magazine Heavy Rock awarded WarCry "revelation band of the year". The band performed their first live concert on 13 December 2002 in Avilés, Asturias as the start of their El Sello De Los Tiempos tour. The tour lasted a year, during which WarCry played with many other heavy metal acts such as Moonspell, Saratoga, Barón Rojo, Sepultura, and Rage. Jardón left the band following the tour, citing musical and personal issues. The other band members stated that they "respected his decision, and Álvaro's work on WarCry would always be a part of the band history, having the friendship of his partners."

=== Alea Jacta Est: 2003–2004 ===
The members of WarCry announced that their next album would be sung in English, but dropped this idea due to the positive reviews that the Spanish-sung El Sello De Los Tiempos received in Central Europe. In August 2003 they began recording a third album, produced by Víctor García and Ardines with the collaboration of Slaven Kolak. The album, Alea Jacta Est, was mixed and edited in the band's own recording studio Jaus Records, and was released on 1 January 2004 through Avispa Music. It was their first album to include writing contributions from each band member (with the exception of Ardines and Mon), as Víctor García had written all of the songs on the previous two albums. Alea Jacta Est reached No. 3 on the FNAC sales list within twelve days of its release.

The album was well received by critics, with Metal Archives stating that "WarCry has become the biggest metal band in Spain after this 3rd release". Francisco Fonseca categorized it as "the best power metal album sung in Spanish", with "a more progressive approach than their usual straightforward power metal". Metal Symphony called it "one of the best Spanish albums of the year". The Alea Jacta Est tour ran from March to November 2004 throughout Spain and included bands such as Sôber, Abyss, and Transfer. At the first performance of the tour the band officially presented Roberto García, formerly of Avalanch, as their new bassist.

=== ¿Dónde Está La Luz?: 2004–2006 ===
In mid-2004 the band began to work on their fourth album ¿Dónde Está La Luz?. It was their only album to be mastered by Simón Echeverría, a record producer known for his work with both mainstream and heavy metal acts. For ¿Dónde Está La Luz? Víctor García resumed the role of primary songwriter, writing all of the lyrics and most of the music as he had for the band's first two albums. The album was released on 1 February 2005 through Avispa, debuting at No. 16 in Spain, and was noted for its lack of double bass drum and more social themes in the lyrics. Both Rolling Stone and Metal Storm declared it "WarCry's heaviest album to date", while El Gráfico said that "WarCry's metal reinvents itself steadily". Such positive reception helped WarCry to increase their exposure throughout Europe. WarCry's tour to support ¿Dónde Está La Luz? lasted seventeen months, running from March 2005 to August 2006. The band played many concerts in Spain, including the Viña Rock festival alongside Sepultura, Mägo de Oz, and Los Suaves. Playing to a crowd of over 15,000 people, WarCry's performance was praised with the band being called "a machine!" and "delivering pure heavy metal". On 25 June 2005 the band participated in the second edition of the BullRock Festival in Asturias.

In November 2005 they played a sold-out concert at the Divino Aqualung in Madrid to a crowd of over 2,500 people. This performance was released in February 2006 as the live album and DVD Directo A La Luz. It was No. 1 in DVD sales in Spain and stayed high on the charts for several weeks, with Metal Symphony saying that it "doesn't lose the energy, metal from beginning to end." They finally concluded their year and a half of touring with a concert in a football pitch in Buñol, Valencia on 26 August 2006.

WarCry's 2004-2007 lineup. L-R: Manuel Ramil, Alberto Ardines, Fernando Mon, Víctor García, Roberto García, and Pablo García.

=== La Quinta Esencia: 2006–2008 ===
While touring WarCry had begun work on their fifth studio album, La Quinta Esencia. It was released on 18 September 2006, the same day that the band received a gold sales certification for Directo A La Luz. La Quinta Esencia peaked No. 19 on the Spanish charts, and the band embarked on a supporting tour the following month. In 2007 WarCry received several awards and recognitions: They were acknowledged in "Rockferendum", a poll held by Kerrang! and Heavy Rock, as well as in Metal Zone and the second edition of AMAS. In May 2007 they played the Mägo de Oz Fest in Mexico alongside Mägo de Oz, U.D.O., Cage, and Maligno. The festival marked WarCry's first performances in Mexico, playing to over 15,000 attendees. In August 2007 Argentinian radio station Heavy Metal Radio named WarCry the "international band of the month".

In August 2007 Víctor García announced that Alberto Ardines and Fernando Mon had left the band on amicable terms, with Ardines wanting to focus on his new record label and own recording studio Triple A-Metal. Rafael Yugueros was the new drummer, having previously worked with Víctor García on the WarCry demo Demon 97 in 1997 before performing in Darna and DarkSun. In the same announcement the band solicited demos from prospective guitarists, finally deciding on José Rubio, formerly of Trilogy. Touring in support of La Quinta Esencia continued in Spain, ending on 28 December 2007 with a performance at the Jamón Rock festival in Guijuelo, Salamanca.

=== Revolución: 2008–present ===
In February 2008 Manuel Ramil was expelled from the group due to his inability to participate in much of the recording of the band's new album (Ramil lived in Galicia, while the album was being recorded in Asturias). Ramil remarked that he was skeptical that physical distance was the true reason that he was expelled from the band, as the group had been working in that manner for five years already. Shortly after, Ramil, Ardines, Mon, and vocalist Toni Amboaje formed a new band called Sauze. These lineup changes forced WarCry to delay the release of their upcoming sixth album from May to September 2008.

WarCry's sixth studio album was mastered in the United States by Tom Baker, known for his work with heavy metal bands such as Alter Bridge, Avenged Sevenfold, Alice Cooper, Judas Priest, and Mötley Crüe. José Rubio stated that for this album the band are using different models of guitars than they have on previous albums, as well as different amplifiers.

In 2017 the band released two albums, one in May called Dónde el Silencio de Rompió... and another in November called Momentos

== Style and lyrical themes ==
"Luz Del Norte"
Ardines' aggressive drumming was prominent on the band's early works. From WarCry (2002).

"El Guardián De Troya"
Víctor García's high-pitched vocal style is demonstrated in this song-ending 17-second scream. From Alea Jacta Est (2004).

"Tu Recuerdo Me Bastará"
WarCry has expanded their use of keyboard harmonies on more recent albums. From La Quinta Esencia (2006).

The band's first two albums contained a straightforward power metal style, with fast tempos, aggressive double bass drumming from Ardines, harmonies with use of keyboards, and García's high-pitched vocal style. All the songwritings ran by Víctor García, which dealt mostly with medieval and epic issues, on songs like "Señor" which references the biblical herculean figure Samson or "Alejandro" referring to Alexander the Great, the ancient Greek king who was one of the most successful military commanders in history.

In 2004 the band released Alea Jacta Est, which is Latin for "the die is cast", this album incorporated progressive metal tendencies, making use of their twin-guitar sound, and most of the members collaborated on the songs. The lyrics now contained personal struggles and mythological themes; "Despertar", explains how it is to open one's eyes to the reality, "Reflejos De Sangre" talks about abuse between two brothers, similar to the story of Cain and Abel.

With ¿Dónde Está La Luz? the lyrics turned more introspective, charged of social issues, such as abuse on songs like "El Regreso", isolation, sin, and also discrimination which is the main idea on "Nuevo Mundo" talking about the immigration in Spain. The music was more elaborated, full of guitar riffs, almost no fast drumming, and García's singing style became more melodic with a soft reflective sound.

Fifth studio album La Quinta Esencia was a mix of their four previous works. The lyrics pointed to all directions, from epic stories like "Ulises" which talks about Odysseus, the legendary Greek king of Ithaca and hero of the Odyssey, to love songs such as "El Más Triste Adiós" and "Tu Recuerdo Me Bastará", or war-related ones like "La Vieja Guardia", "¡Que Vengan Ya!" among others. The music was actually power metal with speed and progressive tendencies, keyboards atmosphere, fast drumming, and García's use of a raugh-and-gravel vocal style.

== Band members ==
- Víctor García – lead vocals (2001–present)
- Pablo García – guitars, backing vocals (2002–present)
- Santi Novoa – keyboards (2008–presente)
- Roberto García – bass, backing vocals (2004–present)
- Rafael Yugueros – drums (2007–present)

=== Former members ===
- Manuel Ramil – keyboards (2002–2008)
- Alberto Ardines – drums (2001–2007)
- Fernando Mon – guitars, backing vocals (2002–2007)
- Álvaro Jardón – bass, backing vocals (2002–2003)
- José Rubio – guitars, backing vocals (2007–2009)

== Discography ==
- 2002: WarCry
- 2002: El Sello De Los Tiempos
- 2004: Alea Jacta Est
- 2005: ¿Dónde Está La Luz?
- 2006: La Quinta Esencia
- 2008: Revolución
- 2011: Alfa
- 2013: Inmortal
- 2017: Donde El Silencio Se Rompió...
- 2017: Momentos
- 2022: Daimon
- 2026: Entre La Niebla

== Awards ==
Radial Awards:

- 2002: Revelation Band - WarCry
- 2002: Best Keyboardist – Manuel Ramil
- 2002: Best Website – WarCry.as
- 2003: Best Singer – Víctor García
- 2003: Best Keyboardist – Manuel Ramil
- 2003: Best Website – WarCry.as
- 2004: Best Singer – Víctor García
- 2004: Best Keyboardist – Manuel Ramil
- 2004: Best Album – Alea Jacta Est
- 2004: Best Band in Concert – WarCry
- 2004: Best Website – WarCry.as

Rockferendum:
Award held by votes from readers of Kerrang! and HeavyRock.

- 2007: Best Album - La Quinta Esencia
- 2007: Best Coverbox - La Quinta Esencia

MetalZone:

- 2007: Best Band - WarCry
- 2007: Best Keyboardist - Manuel Ramil
- 2007: Best Guitarist - Pablo García
- 2008: Best Keyboardist - Manuel Ramil

AMAS Awards:
Anuario de la Musica de Asturias (en: Yearbook of the Music of Asturias).

- 2005: Best Band in Concert – WarCry
- 2006: Best Singer – Víctor García
- 2007: Best Drummer – Rafael Yugueros
- 2007: Best Guitarist – Pablo García

== Tours ==
Duration	Tour	Band lineup						Dates	Ref.
Duration	Tour	Vocals	Guitars		Bass	Keyboard	Drums	Dates	Ref.
December 2002–December 2003	E.S.D.L.T. Tour	V. García	P. García	F. Mon	A. Jardón	M. Ramil	A. Ardines	33	
March–November 2004	A.J.E. Tour	V. García	P. García	F. Mon	R. García	M. Ramil	A. Ardines	26	
March 2005–August 2006	¿D.E.L.L.? Tour	V. García	P. García	F. Mon	R. García	M. Ramil	A. Ardines	45	
October 2006–December 2007	L.Q.E. Tour	V. García	P. García	F. Mon	R. García	M. Ramil	A. Ardines	31	
June–September 2008	Summer Tour	V. García	P. García	J. Rubio	R. García	A. Carrio^{[I]}	R. Yugueros	7	

I Adrián Carrio played only as live keyboardist on the band's 2008 summer tour.
