= Llanto De Un Héroe =

Studio album by Avalanch
- Released: 1999
- Recorded: September 1998 to February 1999
- Genre: Power metal; heavy metal
- Label: Flame Records
- Producer: Alberto Rionda

Avalanch chronology
La Llama Eterna (1997)	Llanto De Un Héroe (1999)	El Ángel Caído (2001)

Llanto De Un Héroe ("Cry Of A Hero") is an album by the power metal band Avalanch, and the first one featuring Víctor García as the lead vocals. The lyrics talk about epic themes, such as Rodrigo Díaz de Vivar, Don Pelayo or Tomás de Torquemada the inquisitor, and about Asturian legends like "Cambaral" and ecologist thematic like "Vientos del Sur", dedicated to Jacques-Yves Cousteau.

== Track listing ==
- All songs by Alberto Rionda, Except 3 and 11 Víctor García
1. "Intro" 01:48
2. "Torquemada" 06:26
3. "Por Mi Libertad" ("For My Freedom") 06:06
4. "Pelayo" 07:16
5. "Vientos Del Sur" ("South Winds") 06:54
6. "Polvo, Sudor Y Sangre" ("Dust, Sweat and Blood") 01:05
7. "Cid" 05:11
8. "¿Dias De Gloria...?" ("Days Of Glory...?") 06:01
9. "No Pidas Que Crea En Ti" ("Don't Ask Me To Believe In You") 05:06
10. "Cambaral" 06:07
11. "Aquí Estaré" ("Here I'll Be") 05:27
12. "Llanto De Un Héroe" ("Cry Of A Hero") 05:04

== Credits ==
- Víctor García - lead vocals, backing vocals
- Alberto Rionda - lead guitar, keyboards
- Rodrigo García - rhythm guitar
- Francisco Fidalgo - bass
- Alberto Ardines - drums

=== Collaborations ===
- Fernando Arias - percussions
- Xuacu Amieva - flutes

=== Production ===
- Raul Alonso - box cover art
- Ricardo Menéndez - graphic design
- Panci Calvo - photography
- Tim Young - mastering
