= Adrián Carrio =

- Born: 1986 (age 39–40); Oviedo, Asturias, Spain
- Genre: Jazz
- Instrument: Piano
- Years active: 1994–present

Adrián Carrio (born 1986) is jazz pianist from Oviedo, Spain. He has led his own band, Rendez-Vous Project.
