= Víctor García (Spanish singer) =

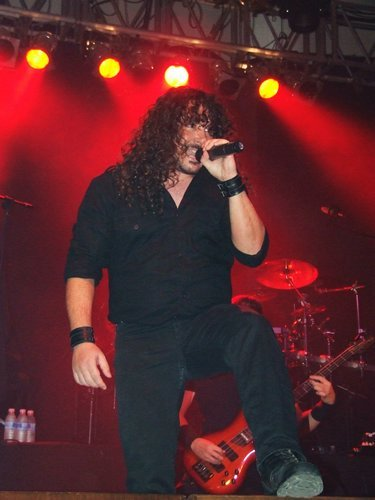
- Víctor García in 2005

Background information
- Born: Víctor García; 5 June 1970 (age 56); Brisbane, Australia
- Origin: Oviedo, Asturias, Spain
- Genres: Power metal; Heavy metal
- Instruments: Vocals; guitar
- Years active: 1987–present
- Label: Avispa
- Website: Official website

Víctor García (born 5 June 1970 in Brisbane, Australia) is the lead vocalist and songwriter for the heavy metal band WarCry. He is the central figure and sole original member of WarCry and a former Avalanch lead vocalist, being considered one of the best Spanish metal singers. García has often cited that his biggest and most important influences are Stryper, Manowar, and Virgin Steele.

== Biography ==
=== Early days ===
Víctor García discovered his passion for metal music around 1987, after listening to Europe's Final Countdown, and some other bands like Bon Jovi. In 1992, he acquired his own guitar and created a band with some friends, named War-Cry. In 1994, Asturian power metal band Avalanch asked García to join them as rhythm guitarist. They recorded a demo and gave some concerts in various localities around Asturias. After leaving Avalanch in February 1996, he reformed the group as WarCry, this time acting as songwriter and lead singer, and recorded the demo Demon 97.

=== Avalanch ===
In 1998, Avalanch expelled their lead vocalist Juan Lozano in the middle of the tour in support of La Llama Eterna, and invited García to re-join them as lead vocalist. García tried to keep working with both bands, but finally decided to break up War-Cry and go up with his work on Avalanch. Now as the new Avalanch front man, they recorded Llanto De Un Héroe in 1999 where he received songwriting credits on two songs, "Por mi Libertad" and "Aquí Estaré". After the successful tour on support of the album, Avalanch recorded their first live work, entitled Días De Gloria and released in 2000. The band was going through a great moment, and entered the studio in late 2000 to record El Ángel Caído, with the vocals contribution of Leo Jiménez (of Saratoga fame) in the song "Las Ruinas del Edén". The album was released in 2001 and became the band's most successful and acclaimed album. García along with Avalanch drummer Alberto Ardines decided to release an album aside from the band with the songs they had been composing in their spare time. Both members were later expelled from Avalanch with the excuse that they were working on a project behind the band's back. Víctor García replied he showed many songs for the albums, but only two were recorded, "Aquí Estaré" and "Por Mi Libertad", becoming "Aquí Estaré", one of the band's hymns, so he decided "to release a couple of songs, but never with the idea of leaving Avalanch."

=== WarCry ===
At the end of the tour on support of El Ángel Caído, Víctor García and Avalanch's drummer decided to record an album with the songs they had composed in their spare time. Most of which had been written during the 1990s with lyrics in English. The pair translated the lyrics into Spanish and produced the album themselves, with Victor singing as well as playing bass guitar, rhythm guitar, and keyboards. Fernando Mon, who had previously worked for Avalanch, and Pablo García of Relative Silence, collaborated on the album by recording guitar solos. Upon learning of Víctor and Ardines' project, Avalanch disapproved of it and expelled them from the band. García stated that he presented many of his song ideas to Avalanch, but received writing credit on only two released songs: "Aquí Estaré" and "Por Mi Libertad". "Aquí Estaré" had barely been accepted by the band but went on to become one of Avalanch's most popular songs, and so he decided "to release a couple of songs, but never with the idea of leaving Avalanch." After being expelled from Avalanch, García showed Ardines the name and logo of WarCry. Ardines felt that those were "fantastic", and that they should continue working on their new musical project using the WarCry name as they already had an "open path". They were joined by Pablo García and Fernando Mon, and recorded their debut album WarCry which was released in April 2002. Shortly after the album's recording they were joined by bassist Alvaro Jardón, formerly of Darna. The album received several positive reviews. WarCry started composing new songs instead of touring in support of the album, so that they would have a larger repertoire to perform.

WarCry's second album, El Sello De Los Tiempos, was released in December 2002 through Avispa. Receiving better critics than the debut album. The band performed their first live concert on 13 December 2002 in Avilés, Asturias as the start of their El Sello De Los Tiempos tour. The tour lasted a year, during which WarCry played with many other heavy metal acts such as Moonspell, Saratoga, Barón Rojo, Sepultura, and Rage. Jardón left the band following the tour, citing musical and personal issues.

In August 2003 they began recording a third album, produced by Víctor García and Ardines with the collaboration of Slaven Kolak. The album, Alea Jacta Est, was mixed and edited in the band's own recording studio Jaus Records, and was released on 1 January 2004 through Avispa Music. It was their first album to include writing contributions from each band member (with the exception of Ardines), as Víctor García had written all of the songs on the previous two albums. Alea Jacta Est reached #3 on the FNAC sales list within twelve days of its release. On the first concert for the tour, WarCry officially presented Roberto García, formerly of Avalanch, as their new bassist.

== Discography ==
WarCry

- 2002: WarCry
- 2002: El Sello De Los Tiempos
- 2004: Alea Jacta Est
- 2005: ¿Dónde Está La Luz?
- 2006: Directo A La Luz [live]
- 2006: La Quinta Esencia
- 2008: Revolución
- 2011: Alfa
- 2012: Omega
- 2013: Inmortal
- 2017: Donde El Silencio Se Rompió...

Avalanch

- 1999: Llanto De Un Héroe
- 2000: Días De Gloria [live]
- 2001: El Ángel Caído

Adventus

- 2021: Morir y Renacer

Tribute albums

- 1999: Transilvania 666 — Iron Maiden ("Run to the Hills")
- 2000: The Attack of the Dragons — Queen
- 2000: Metal Gods — Judas Priest ("Hell Patrol")

Important collaborations

- 2002: Mixture? — Relative Silence
- 2004: Belfast — Mägo De Oz
- 2005: Gaia II: La Voz Dormida — Mägo De Oz
