= FreakMind =

Spanish alternative metal band

Freakmind
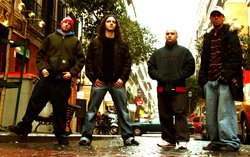

Background information
- Origin: Madrid, Spain
- Genres: Alternative rock, alternative metal, nu metal, progressive rock, post-rock
- Years active: 2001–present
- Labels: Underground, M-20
- Members: Alberto (vocals); Dani (drums); Javi (guitar); Rubén (bass)

FreakMind is a Spanish alternative metal band formed in 2001 in Madrid. Its lineup consisted of Alberto, Dani, Javi and Rubén. The band has released one demo and three studio albums with the label Underground, M-20. Their musical style mixes alternative rock and nu metal.

== History ==
In December of 2001, Alberto (lead vocals) and Dani (drums), coming from Only For, began to look forother members for a new musical project. The pair hired Javi (lead guitar) of Holocausto. In February 2002, after having shuffled several names for the group, they chose FreakMind.

During the second week of December of 2002, FreakMind recorded their first demo in the Cube studios of Madrid with producer Luis Tarraga and sound engineer Alberto Seara. The songs that are included in this demo are Empty, Liquid Sand and Madness Threads. The demo was received positively, with numerous Internet forums hosting positive reviews.

In the summer of 2004, after going through multiple bass guitarists, Ivan (bass guitar - The Dandelion) joined the group. FreakMind recorded at the studios M-20 (Madrid) with BigSimon (Mago de Oz, Stravaganzza, Coilbox, Terroristars, Skizoo) as producer on its first album “Six Degrees of Separation” in April–May 2005.

Ivan decided to leave the group in the summer of 2006. A few weeks later, Ruben (bass guitar) joined FreakMind, coming from Osmio.

"Six Degrees of Separation” was released in March 2007 by Lengua Armada.

== Discography ==
- Demo – 2002
- Six Degrees of Separation – 2005
- A través de tus ojos – 2008
- 42 días – 2009

== Members ==
- Alberto – vocals
- Javi – guitar
- Rubén – bass
- Dani – drums
