= Skunk City =

Neighborhood in Syracuse, New York

Coordinates: 43.0361°N 76.1799°W

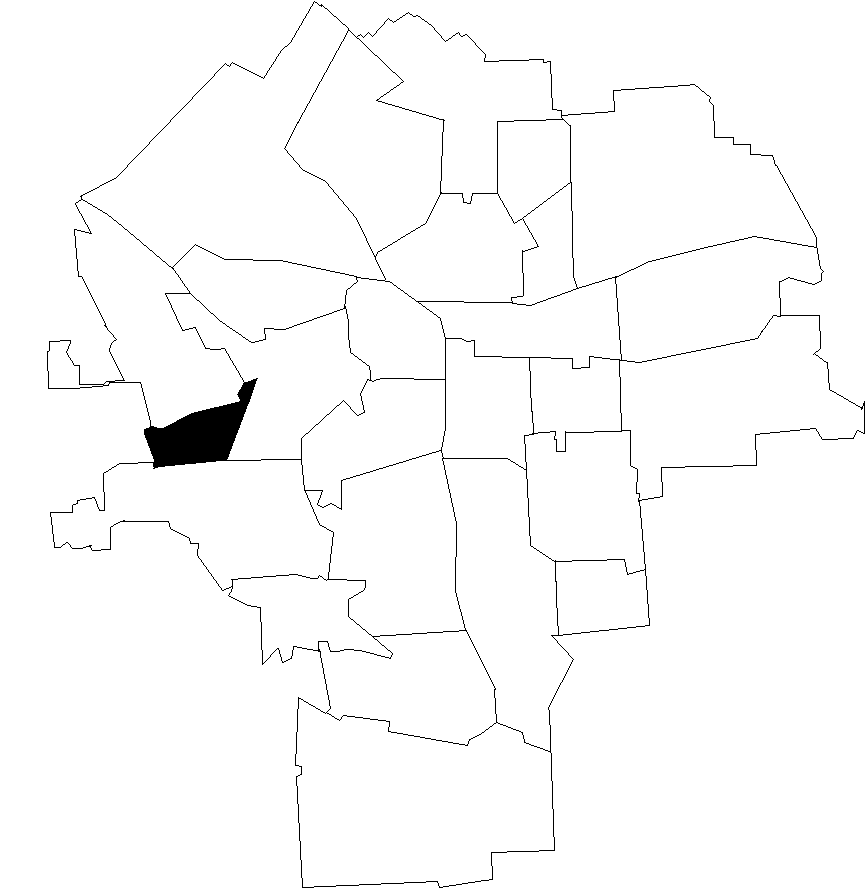
- Established: 1886

Population (2000)
  - Total: 2,355
- ZIP Codes: 13204

Skunk City is a Syracuse, New York neighborhood that for a number of years has been known by this name, and before 1886 was a rural part of the Town of Geddes. The area was first inhabited by Irish immigrants but later grew to include a variety of ethnic communities. The neighborhood boundaries are Geddes St. on the east, Grand Ave. and Burnet Park on the north, and West Onondaga St. on the south. Harbor Brook Retention area is to the west. The root of neighborhood's name is not explicitly stated. While some attribute it to the unusually high number of skunks that roam the area at night, others cite the smell given off by the local creek.
