= Revolución (WarCry album) =

Studio album by WarCry
- Released: October 27, 2008
- Recorded: March 31, 2008–July, 2008 in Bilbao, Spain
- Genre: Power metal
- Length: 56:29
- Language: Spanish
- Producer: WarCry

WarCry chronology
La Quinta Esencia (2006)	Revolución (2008)	Alfa (2011)

Revolución (English: Revolution) is the sixth studio album by Spanish power metal band WarCry. This was the band's first release after La Quinta Esencia and with the new line-up. Víctor García stated on the band's website that the name of the songs had pretty much nothing to do with the meaning of the lyrics, e.g. "El Cazador" (The Hunter) "doesn't talk about the profession of being hunter, but the word's darker side, where killer would be the right way to describe it.

== Track listing ==
1. La Última Esperanza ("The last hope")
2. El Cazador ("The hunter")
3. Nada Como Tú ("Nothing like you")
4. La Carta Del Adiós ("The letter of goodbye")
5. Invierno En Mi Corazón ("Winter inside my heart")
6. Coraje ("Braveness")
7. La Prisión Invisible ("The invisible prison")
8. La Vida En Un Beso ("Life in a kiss")
9. El Camino ("The way")
10. Absurda Falsedad ("Absurd falseness")
11. Devorando El Corazón ("Devouring the heart")
12. Abismo ("Abyss")

== Personnel ==
WarCry

- Víctor García – vocals
- Pablo García – guitars
- José Rubio – guitars
- Roberto García – bass
- Rafael Yugueros – drums
