= Human (band) =

New Zealand death metal band

Human is a death metal band from Christchurch, New Zealand.

Human was formed on 8 March 1992 by brothers Paul and Scott Harrison, on drums and guitars, respectively, and vocalist / guitarist Nathan Ballard. Bassist Vaughn Richardson joined in May of that year.

Human entered Nga Matuaka Studios in May and recorded the three-track demo cassette Organ Splatters, which was distributed throughout the heavy metal underground / tape-trading networks of the time. The band appeared on a September 1992 edition of New Zealand's 60 Minutes programme on TV3 as part of a documentary on suicide and depression, and the connection to heavy metal music.

Human has toured and recorded several times since then and continues today.

== Discography ==
- 1992 – Organ Splatters (3 song demo)
- 1993 – Vomit Discreetly (10 song demo)
- 1993 – Things That Make You Go (6 song demo)
- 1994 – Crunchy Frog (7" single, b/w Foreskin Face)
- 1995 – Not So Famous Game Show Themes (7 song demo)
- 1996 – Playtime for the Sex Machine (6 song demo)
- 1999 – The Sound of Yellow (album)
- 2000 – 69 Minutes of Self Abusement (demo compilation)
- 2002 – Demo Disc (3 song promo disc)
- 2004 – Blood Bucket (album + 2 videos)
- 2009 – Cadaver Academy (album)

== Personnel ==
=== Current ===
- Scott Spatcher-Harrison – vocals, lead guitar (1992–present)
- Vaughn Richardson – vocals, distorted bass (1992–present)
- Keiran Brewster – vocals, rhythm guitar (2005–present)
- Victor Thompson – drums, percussion (2013–present)

=== Former ===
- Adam McGrath – bass (1992)
- Nathan Ballard – vocals, rhythm guitar (1992)
- Matt "Matt Alien" Johnstone – vocals (1993–1995)
- Tim Facoory – rhythm guitar (1997–2004)
- Mitch Hopley – rhythm guitar (2004–2005)
- Paul Harrison – drums (1992–2008)
- Nikolas Kissel – drums (2008–2012)
- Daniel Pawsey – drums (2012–2013)
