= Roberto García (bassist) =

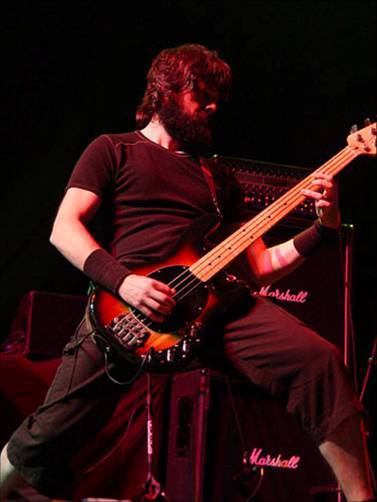
- Roberto García in 2006

Background information
- Born: 13 August 1972 (age 52); Oviedo, Spain
- Genres: Heavy metal, power metal
- Instrument(s): Bass, guitar
- Years active: 1994–present
- Labels: Avispa

Roberto García (born 13 August 1972 in Oviedo, Spain) is the bassist for the power metal band WarCry, also known for his work on Avalanch.

== History ==
García's interest in music started around the age of five. The Spanish guitar, as well as the keyboard, were the instruments he first learned to play. Although his education was centered on classic authors, Roberto had been very interested since his adolescence in bands such as Metallica, Accept and Judas Priest.

In 1997, García asked his friend Alberto Rionda, from Avalanch, to give him guitar classes, and in that manner he became part of the band. He played on four Avalanch albums, La Llama Eterna, Llanto De Un Héroe, Días De Gloria and El Ángel Caído.

After personal and professional problems with Alberto Rionda, Garcia left Avalanch. In 2004, he joined the band WarCry, which had been formed by friends Víctor García and Alberto Ardines.

== Discography ==
=== Avalanch ===
- 1997 — La Llama Eterna
- 1999 — Llanto De Un Héroe
- 2000 — Días De Gloria (live)
- 2001 — El Ángel Caído

=== WarCry ===
- 2005 — ¿Dónde Está La Luz?
- 2006 — Directo A La Luz (live)
- 2006 — La Quinta Esencia
- 2008 — Revolución
- 2011 — Alfa
- 2012 — Omega (live)
- 2013 — Inmortal

=== On tributes ===
- 1999 — Transilvania 666 (Iron Maiden)
- 2000 — The Attack of the Dragons (Queen)
- 2000 — Metal Gods (Judas Priest)

=== Collaborations ===
- Indiceission (Human) (2003)
