= Sauze (Spanish band) =

Spanish alternative/power metal band

- Origin: Asturias, Spain
- Genres: Heavy metal Alternative metal Power metal
- Years active: 2008 - 2010
- Label: Triple A-Metal
- Spinoff of: WarCry
- Members: Toni Amboaje; Fernando Mon; Manuel Ramil; Alberto Ardines
- Website: Sauze.es

Sauze was an alternative/power metal band from Asturias, Spain. The band was formed in 2008 after the departure of the ex-WarCry members Alberto Ardines, Fernando Mon, and Manuel Ramil, along with ex-Hard Spirit Toni Amboaje.

== History ==
When they were out of WarCry they decided to form a new band, Ardines called Mon to show him an album by Hard Spirit a metal band that had just been created and helped by Triple-A-Metal (Ardines's own record label), with the purpose of showing Mon the vocal qualities of Amboaje. They decided that he was the singer they were looking for, and called Ramil to join them. Manuel Ramil was trying to participate in both bands WarCry and Sauze, but it was getting more difficult due to the distance between his home in Galicia and the rest of the members' in Asturias, they decided that Ramil could no longer be a member of the band and he left WarCry, now he's completely dedicated to Sauze, which is currently working on what it will be their debut album.

== Discography ==
- Nada Tiene Sentido (2008)
- El Mejor Momento (2009)

== Members ==
- Toni Amboaje - vocals
- Fernando Mon - guitars
- Manuel Ramil - keyboards
- Alberto Ardines - drums

== See also ==
- WarCry
- Avalanch
- Hard Spirit
- List of bands from Spain

== Notes ==
All sites in Spanish:
