= Rafael Yugueros =

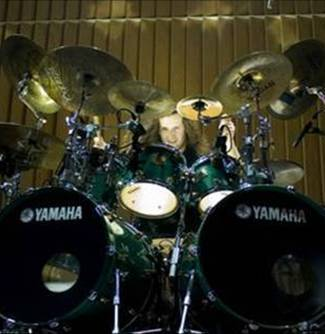

Background information
- Born: 8 September 1977 (age 48); Asturias, Spain
- Genres: Power metal
- Instrument: Drums
- Years active: 1994 – present
- Label: Avispa
- Member of: WarCry

Rafael Yugueros (born 8 September 1977 in Oviedo, Asturias, Spain) is the drummer of the power metal band WarCry where he played, until the band's split, and rejoined in September, 2007. With influences from Metallica, U2, Pink Floyd, The Police, Led Zeppelin and Death.

== Career ==
In 1986, when The Final Countdown was released Yugueros, along with his cousin, built a home-made drum composed of, cans?!! From that moment he never got away from the drums, and music in general, especially Rock and Metal, but he liked Jazz too, after listening to The Jazz Messengers, by Art Blakey.

Once he had his own drums, in 1994, he began to play on some bands until he formed part of WarCry, in 1997.

After the band's split he played on many other bands, like Darna and DarkSun.

Meanwhile, he was part of an orchestra and various groups with different music-styles, such as Blues, Jazz and Pop. Receiving classes from various music-professors like Félix Morales. He combines his music with intense activity with the facet of durum-professor.

== Discography ==
=== WarCry ===
- Demon 97 (Demo) (1997)
- Revolución (2008)
- Alfa (2011)
- Omega (2012)
- Inmortal (2013)

=== Darna ===
- Darna (2001)
- II (2003)

=== DarkSun ===
- El Lado Oscuro (2006)
- The Dark Side (2007)
