= La Llama Eterna =

Studio album by Avalanch
- Released: 1997
- Recorded: 1996–1997
- Genre: Power metal
- Length: 76:24
- Producer: Alberto Rionda

Avalanch chronology
Ready to the Glory (1993)	La Llama Eterna (1997)	Llanto De Un Héroe (1999)

La Llama Eterna is the first studio album by the Asturian power metal band Avalanch, released in 1997. This work was later released in English under the name Eternal Flame on April 17, 2002.

== Track listing ==
1. "La Llama Eterna" – 5:08
2. "El Mundo Perdido" – 6:29
3. "El Despertar" – 1:17
4. "Vicio Letal" – 4:52
5. "Esclavo de la Ira" – 5:35
6. "Avalon, la Morada del Rey Arturo" – 1:12
7. "Excalibur" – 6:22
8. "Sigue así" – 4:43
9. "Rainbow Warrior" – 5:58
10. "Juego cruel" – 6:05
11. "La Taberna" – 3:30
12. "Avalanch" – 12:33
13. "El Cierre de la Taberna – 2:01

== Personnel ==
- Vocals: Juan Lozano
- Bass: Francisco Fidalgo
- Chorus: Elena Pérez Herrero, Mauricio Septién, Fernando Mon, Juan Moyano
- Percussion: Fernando Arias
- Flute: Lluis
- The rest of the instruments: Alberto Rionda
