= Jaus Records =

Spanish record label

- Founded: 2002
- Status: Active
- Genre: Power metal Heavy metal
- Country of origin: Spain
- Location: Oviedo, Asturias
- Official website: WarCry.as

Jaus Records is an independent record label and recording studio from Oviedo, Asturias, Spain, created on 2002 exclusively to record and support the works by Spanish power metal band WarCry. It has recorded and helped to release every single work by the band, except for the demo Demon 97, which was released on 1997 when the band was still a side project from the members original groups. They had the idea to support other bands, preferably from Asturias, Spain. But in an interview to WarCry's front-man Víctor García he commented that this needs a lot of responsibility, sacrifice, and work, and it could be a better option to support the bands' best works only.

== Works released ==
All the works released by WarCry.

- 2002 — WarCry
- 2002 — El Sello De Los Tiempos
- 2004 — Alea Jacta Est
- 2005 — ¿Dónde Está La Luz?
- 2006 — Directo A La Luz [live]
- 2006 — La Quinta Esencia
- 2008 — Revolución
- 2011 — Alfa

== See also ==
- List of record labels
- List of record labels starting with J
