= Pablo García (musician) =

Spanish guitarist (born 1976)

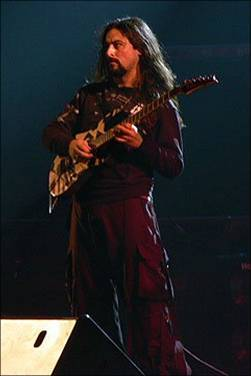
- Pablo García playing with WarCry at the "Atalaya Rock" festival, in Spain, 2007.

Background information
- Born: December 26, 1976 (age 49); Oviedo, Spain
- Genres: Heavy metal Power metal
- Instrument: Guitar
- Years active: 1993 - present
- Label: Avispa

Pablo García Fernández (born December 26, 1976, in Oviedo, Spain) is a guitarist, for the power metal band WarCry.

== Career ==
Pablo's first contact with the guitar occurred at the age of 16, in the summer of 1993. He was self-taught and decided to dedicate most of his time to the instrument, leading him to form his first band with some friends. When things became more serious, he joined WarCry in 1996. Later he became part of another local band, Presto, recording an EP, "Disciples Of Fear", covering some Yngwie Malmsteen songs at the venue Quatro De Avilés. During that time he attended the Instituto de Música y Tecnología (IMT) in Madrid in July, where they mainly studied harmony.

After Presto separated, he started a Progressive metal project named Relative Silence along with former members of Presto and WarCry. They recorded two albums: the first one was untitled and contained three tracks, including a version of Iron Maiden, and the second album was recorded between December 2001 and January 2002, entitled "Mixture?", with four tracks.

In January 2001, Víctor and Alberto asked him to collaborate on their first studio album, WarCry. After a while, he decided to become an active member of the band and left aside his participation in Relative Silence.

Over the years he has attended several jazz courses by the pianist Joshua Edelman and the guitarists Chema Saiz and Joaquín Chacón, combining his role in WarCry with another career as a "Guitar Professor". His main influences include Dream Theater, Symphony X, and guitarists such as John Petrucci, Michael Romeo, Paul Gilbert, Steve Vai and Yngwie Malmsteen. Pablo's first contact with a guitar emerges at the age of 16, in the summer of 1993, on a self-taught, and decides to dedicate most of his time to that instrument. Leading him to form his first band with some friends. When everything becomes a little bit more serious he joins WarCry in 1996. Later he would become part of another local band Presto recording an EP "Disciples Of Fear" covering some Yngwie Malmsteen's songs in the salon Quatro De Avilés. During that time he attends to the Instituto de Música y Tecnología (IMT) in Madrid in the month of July where they mainly studied harmony.

After Presto's separation he starts along with former components of Presto and WarCry a Progressive metal project named Relative Silence recording two albums, the first one was untitled and contained three specific tracks which included a version of Iron Maiden, and the second album was recorded between December 2001 and January 2002, entitled "Mixture?" with 4 tracks.

In January 2001 Víctor and Alberto asked him to collaborate in their first studio album WarCry. After a while, he finally decides to become an active member of the band and leaves aside his participation in Relative Silence.

Over the years he has attended to several courses of Jazz by the pianist Joshua Edelman and the guitarists Chema Saiz and Joaquín Chacón. Combining his role in WarCry with another career "Guitar Professor". His biggest influences are Dream Theater, Symphony X, and guitarists like John Petrucci, Michael Romeo, Paul Gilbert, Steve Vai and Yngwie Malmsteen.

== Discography ==
=== Presto ===
- Presto (EP) (1998)

=== Relative Silence ===
- Mixture? (2002)

=== WarCry ===
- WarCry (2002)
- El Sello De Los Tiempos (2002)
- Alea Jacta Est (2004)
- ¿Dónde Está La Luz? (2005)
- Directo A La Luz (2006)
- La Quinta Esencia (2006)
- Revolución (2008)
- Alfa (2011)
- Omega (2012)
- Inmortal (2013)

== Personal information ==
- Name: Pablo García Fernández.
- Birthplace: Oviedo, Spain.
- Date Of Birth: December/26/1976.
- Instrument: Guitar.
- In WarCry: 1996 - 1997/2002–present.
- Influences: Dream Theater, John Petrucci, Symphony X, Michael Romeo, Racer X, Yngwie Malmsteen...
- Formations: WarCry, Relative Silence, Presto.
- First CD: Street Lethal - Racer X
