= Fernando Mon =

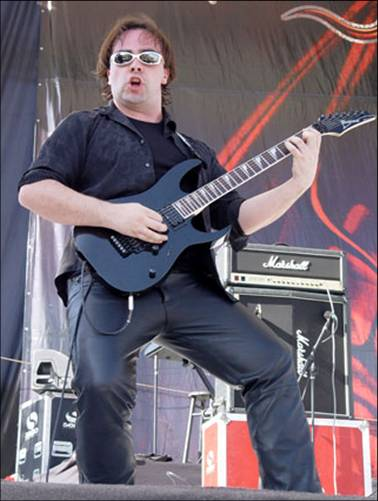

Background information
- Born: 12 December 1976 (age 49); Oviedo, Spain
- Genres: Power metal
- Instrument: Guitar
- Years active: 1989 – present

Fernando (born 12 December 1976 in Oviedo, Spain) is a member of the Asturian power metal band WarCry. He is working on a new alternative/power metal band called Sauze formed by himself, along with Manuel Ramil, Alberto Ardines, and Toni Amboaje.

== Career ==
When he was eight years old, he was interested in the keyboard and the flute. Two years later he began studying music theory, rhythm, piano and organ. When he was 13 he began to play the guitar, the instrument he would focus on.

He knew Alberto Rionda, through whom he joined the Asturian Power metal band Avalanch which was being formed. He was 17 years old and he was competent on the keyboard. During that time he met Víctor García (from WarCry).

He then left the band because he wanted to focus on his guitar-studies, and rejoined later. In 2001 he was fired from Avalanch, along with Alberto Ardines. His friend Víctor García asked him to join the band. At first he only collaborated on their debut self-titled album WarCry.

However, following the album release he was invited to join the band and accepted. Since 2002 he has worked on all the band's albums.

On 25 August 2007 he participated in his last concert with WarCry. Four days later he decided to leave the band, along with Alberto Ardines.

== Discography ==
=== WarCry ===
- 2002 — El Sello De Los Tiempos
- 2004 — Alea Jacta Est
- 2005 — ¿Dónde Está La Luz?
- 2006 — Directo A La Luz
- 2006 — La Quinta Esencia

=== Sauze ===
- 2008 — Nada Tiene Sentido

=== Collaborations ===
- 2002 — WarCry
