= Directo A La Luz =

Live album by WarCry
- Released: February 27, 2006
- Recorded: Nov 5, 2005 - Madrid, Spain
- Genres: Heavy metal Power metal
- Length: DVD ??? CD 70:18
- Language: Spanish
- Label: Jaus/Avispa
- Producer: Jaus Records

WarCry chronology
¿Dónde Está La Luz? (2005)	Directo A La Luz (2006)	La Quinta Esencia (2006)

Alternative cover
- Alternative cover

Professional ratings
Review scores
Source	Rating
Metal Symphony	4.5/5 stars

Directo A La Luz (en: "Straight To The Light/Live To The Light") is the first live album by the Spanish power metal band WarCry, recorded in Madrid, Spain on November 5, 2005 in the music hall "Divino Aqualung" to a crowd of over 2,500 people. In the concert WarCry played various songs from every album released to that point. It was released on February 27, 2006 (see 2006 in music) in digipak format DVD-CD. The CD format only contained a selection of the band's most successful songs played on the concert.

Around those days, WarCry was the only one band to perform a sold-out concert, where even Steve Vai, who participated before couldn't make it. On February 25, 2006 just 2 days before its release, Directo A La Luz was awarded as the year's best national concert, on the AMAS awards first edition. The public and the sales have praised this work which, as said by the band itself, "tries to transmit every single thing who describes WarCry on stage".

They were invited twice to the TV channel Televisión Española in less than 2 months, the first show was given on April 4, with the song "Nuevo Mundo" on the program Música Uno; and the other one on May 12, 2006. Directo A La Luz was also the # 1 on DVDs sales in Spain and stood in high positions for many weeks, among works like U2's Vertigo 2005: Live from Chicago, Iron Maiden's Death on the Road, Jimi Hendrix's Live at Woodstock. On September 18, 2006, WarCry attended to a celebration with the press and fans in Madrid signing more than 1,500 people's discs, to receive the gold certification for Directo A La Luz and make the official presentation of the new album, La Quinta Esencia.

== Track listing ==
=== DVD ===
1. "Nuevo Mundo" ("New World")
2. "Luz Del Norte" ("Northern Light")
3. "El Regreso" ("The Return")
4. "Aire" ("Air")
5. "Perdido" ("Lost")
6. "Despertar" ("Awaken")
7. "Tu Ausencia" ("Your Absence")
8. "Hijo De La Ira" ("Son Of The Rage")
9. "Contra El Viento" ("Against The Wind")
10. "Señor" ("Lord")
11. "El Amor De Una Madre" ("A Mother's Love")
12. "Alejandro" ("Alexander")
13. "En Un Lugar Sin Dios" ("In A Place Without God")
14. "Dispuesto A Combatir" ("Willing To Fight")
15. "El Anticristo" ("The Antichrist")
16. "Trono Del Metal" ("Throne Of The Metal")
17. "Tú Mismo" ("Yourself")
18. "Espíritu De Amor" ("Spirit Of Love")
19. "El Guardián De Troya" ("The Guardian Of Troy")
20. "Nana" ("Lullaby")
21. "Capitán Lawrence" ("Captain Lawrence")
22. "Hoy Gano Yo" ("Today I Win")

Extras

1. Making off: How was the day until the concert from WarCry's point of view.
2. Preparation
3. Images of the public waiting for the concert.
4. Before the concert scenes.

=== CD ===
1. "Nuevo Mundo" ("New World") - 6:12
2. "Luz Del Norte" ("Northern Light") - 5:23
3. "Hijo De La Ira" ("Son Of The Rage") - 6:05
4. "Contra El Viento" ("Against The Wind") - 5:00
5. "El Amor De Una Madre" ("A Mother's Love") - 5:28
6. "Trono Del Metal" ("Throne Of The Metal") - 6:06
7. "Espíritu De Amor" ("Spirit Of Love") - 6:21
8. "Tú Mismo" ("Yourself") - 4:57
9. "En Un Lugar Sin Dios" ("In A Place Without God") - 5:56
10. "Nana" ("Lullaby") - 4:59
11. "Capitán Lawrence" ("Captain Lawrence") - 7:02
12. "Hoy Gano Yo" ("Today I Win") - 6:49

== Credits ==
- Víctor García - vocals
- Pablo García - guitars
- Fernando Mon - guitars
- Roberto García - bass
- Manuel Ramil - keyboards
- Alberto Ardines - drums

=== Production ===
- Francisco De Borja - Video Recording
- Hand Made S.L. - Audio Recording
- Pronorte - Illumination
- Daniel Alonso - Design
- Daniel Sanz - Edition
- Sergio Blanco - Photos
- Esteban Casasolas & Alberto Ardines - Mastering
