= Toni Amboaje =

- Born: 1981 (age 44–45); Spain
- Genres: American Rock; Power metal Alternative metal
- Instrument: vocals
- Years active: Present
- Label: GMG

Toni Amboaje is a Spanish-born singer former metal band Sauze member, which formed in early 2008 and currently the lead singer for AMBOJE.

== History ==
Amboaje discovered his passion for music when he was only four years old, during the 1980s while listening to his parents' favorite singer Bruce Springsteen and band Dire Straits, this marked his influences to be a musician. It was not until 1992 that he discovered Bryan Adams's Waking Up the Neighbours that changed the way he thought of music leading him to play the guitar, write and sing his own songs.

Amboaje was self-taught and bought his own electric guitar in 1998, forming a band along with a friend of his, Gus Velasco. After some years improving themselves, learning how to play in a more professional way, decide the style and recruit the correct members, it's formed on mid 2002 the metal band Hard Spirit.

Already on Hard Spirit he lived processes of creation and evolution of a band, after more than 50 concerts in Spain, winning the award for best vocalist on Villa de Bilbao, Hard Spirit released their debut album Walk the Wild with good critics reception. That same year Amboaje participated in an AOR project from Jaén Hardleywood's band, where he co-wrote and sang on 3 songs. On late 2007 he accepted Ardines, Mon and Ramil's invitation to join them as lead vocalist for alternative metal band Sauze, where he participated on debut album Nada Tiene Sentido, released on June 1, 2008.

Toni signed with Global Music Group [GMG] USA in late 2015 to release the band's latest LP "All About Living".

== Discography ==
=== With Hard Spirit ===
- Walk the Wild - 2007

=== With Sauze ===
- Nada Tiene Sentido - 2008
- El Mejor Momento - 2009

=== With AMBOAJE ===
- All About Living - 2016
