= Saratoga (band) =

Spanish metal band

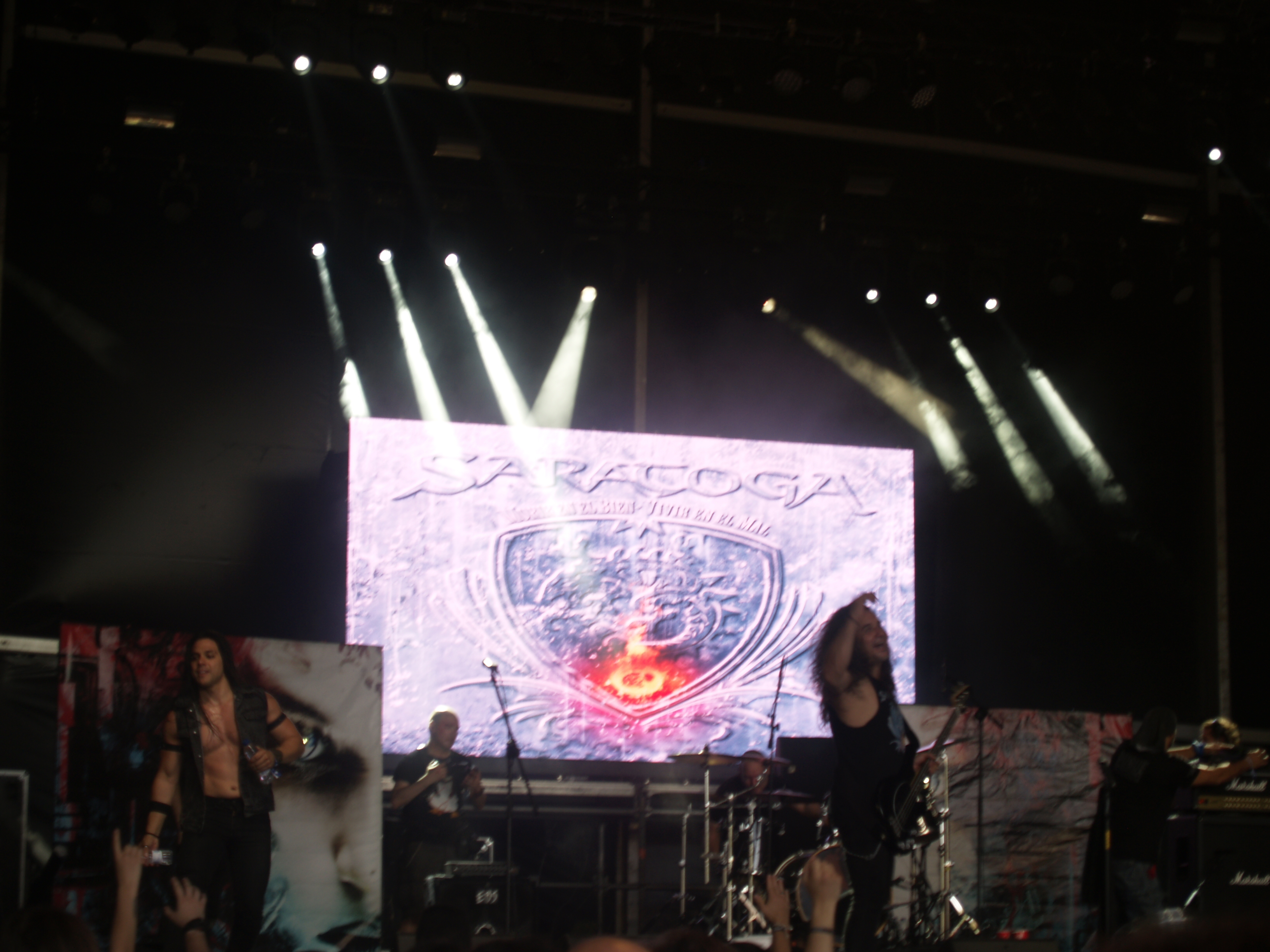
- Saratoga performing in 2017

Background information
- Origin: Madrid, Spain
- Genres: Heavy metal; power metal; speed metal
- Years active: 1992–2013; 2015–present
- Labels: Avispa; Maldito Records
- Members: Niko Del Hierro; Tete Novoa; Arnau Martí; Charlie Parra
- Past members: Marcos Parra; Joaquín Arellano; Tony Domínguez; Fortu Sánchez; Gabriel Boente; Leo Jiménez; Andy C.; Tony Hernando; Dani Pérez; Jorge Garrido; Jero Ramiro
- Website: saratoga.com.es

Saratoga is a Spanish heavy metal band established in Madrid in 1992 by bassist Niko del Hierro (Ñu, Barón Rojo) and guitarist Jero Ramiro (Santa, Ñu). Since March 2023, the band's lineup has consisted of del Hierro, Ramiro, Tete Novoa (vocals), and Arnau Martí (drums). The band experienced their biggest success during the tenure of vocalist Leo Jiménez (1999–2006). Since 2014, with the arrival of Novoa, they have seen a resurgence in popularity. Saratoga has released fourteen studio albums, five live records, and four compilations, as well as numerous singles.

== History ==
=== Early years: Saratoga, Mi Ciudad, and Vientos de Guerra (1992–1999) ===
Saratoga was formed in Madrid in 1992 by Ñu bassist Niko Del Hierro and guitarist Jero Ramiro. They were soon joined by drummer Marcos Parra. The latter left shortly after and was replaced by Joaquín "el niño" Arellano. Vocalist Tony Dominguez joined the band but was asked to leave in 1993 as his voice was seen as not fitting the band's style. Fructuoso "Fortu" Sánchez took over his post. They signed a contract with the Madrid record company Avispa in December 1994 and a year later released their debut, self-titled album. With the same lineup, they released a covers album a year later, titled Tributo, which constituted a tribute to the most important Spanish hard rock bands of the 1970s and 1980s. After the album came out, Sánchez departed the group and was replaced by Gabriel Boente. In 1997, their third album, Mi Ciudad, came out, demonstrating a heavier sound, and garnering the band some success in European countries. In 1998, after the departure of Arellano and Boente, Saratoga hired drummer Dani Pérez and vocalist Leo Jiménez, who brought a fresh style to the band's sound. A year later, they released the album Vientos de Guerra, a harder-sounding record than their previous work.

=== Agotarás and El Clan de la Lucha (2000–2004) ===
In the first year of the new millennium, Saratoga issued their first live record, a double-CD titled Tiempos de Directo. This was followed by their fifth studio album, Agotarás, in 2002. The album proved to be seminal in the band's career, bringing greater international recognition, with Latin America as a new market. In an attempt to secure English-speaking audiences, the band recorded two songs in English for the EP Heaven's Gate in 2003. They followed this with the live CD/DVD A Morir the same year.

In March 2004, Saratoga entered the studio to record their next album, El Clan de la Lucha. They launched a tour to promote it on 20 March, with the opportunity to open for folk metal band Mägo de Oz at Las Ventas, Madrid, in front of 10,000 spectators. This was their longest tour up to that point, lasting close to two years nonstop. The band also released the CD/DVD Saratoga 1992–2004, consisting of a compilation of rarities spanning their career up to that time.

=== Tierra de lobos, lineup changes, and The Fighting Clan (2005–2006) ===
In October 2005, Saratoga began mixing their next record, with Ramiro and del Hierro on production duties. The album, titled Tierra de lobos, was released on 28 November. On 17 December 2005, the band revealed that Dani Pérez had left Saratoga. The drummer, who was at the time playing for three bands concurrently, including Stravaganzza and Skizoo, had decided to put his energy into his other two projects. Andres Cobos (known as Andy C.), previously of Dark Moor, replaced Pérez. The Tierra de Lobos tour started on 14 January 2006 in Madrid. However, at the beginning of the summer, Leo Jiménez officially announced that Saratoga would be going on hiatus starting in October. Among the reasons cited, Jiménez mentioned that both he and Ramiro wanted to take a break from Saratoga's busy schedule, as well as in his case, spending more time with his other band, Stravaganzza.

On 2 November 2006, Saratoga announced that Jiménez and Ramiro were departing the band, with del Hierro and Andy C. remaining. Before the end of the year, they reissued their 2004 album El clan de la lucha in English, under the name The Fighting Clan. This version of the album had been recorded at the same time as the Spanish one, and retained the vocals of Leo Jiménez.

=== VII, Secretos y Revelaciones (2007–2011) ===
At the beginning of 2007, guitarist Tony Hernando joined Saratoga, followed by vocalist Tete Novoa. The band entered the studio to record their seventh album, aptly titled VII, which went on sale on 8 October 2007. The record was produced by Niko del Hierro and Tony Hernando. The band immediately went on tour to promote it, even performing in the Americas for the first time, specifically in Quito, Ecuador.

On 5 October 2009, Saratoga released their next album, Secretos y Revelaciones. This album was again produced by del Hierro and Hernando, and mastered by Roland Grapow. They began a tour of Spain the same month, and the following year they toured Latin America once more; for the first time in their career, the band got a chance to perform in the United States. While on this tour, they recorded the live CD/DVD Revelaciones de una noche, and released it on 7 June 2011. In September of that year, their record label Avispa released the collection Si no amaneciera (Baladas), which compiled all the ballads the group had recorded up to that point, as well as a few rarities.

=== Némesis and breakup (2012–2014) ===
On 8 May 2012, Saratoga's ninth album, Némesis, went on sale. Like its predecessor, it was produced by del Hierro and Hernando, and mastered by Grapow. The promotional tour for this album began in May in Valladolid, Spain, and ran until 2013; it again included a tour of Latin America. To commemorate the band's twentieth anniversary, a concert was held during the tour in Madrid, with former members of Saratoga joining the band onstage, except Jero Ramiro. With tour dates still pending, on 6 August 2013 the band published a statement from del Hierro, announcing an indefinite cessation of musical activities, citing personal fatigue after twenty-one years of existence.

=== Return; Morir en el bien, Vivir en el mal; Aeternus; XXX (2015–present) ===
In October 2014, Niko del Hierro and Jero Ramiro announced Saratoga's return to performing, without announcing a full lineup. The following month, it was revealed that Tete Novoa and Dani Pérez had rejoined the band. They embarked on a tour that included stops in Latin America. Ramiro announced that the band was working on a new album, to be released in 2016. Morir en el bien, Vivir en el mal saw the light on 13 May 2016, and was followed by another tour.

On 27 June 2017, it was announced that the band would go on tour to celebrate their 25-year history and 15 years since the release of Agotarás. The tour, referred to as 25/15, began in Mallorca on 14 October 2017 and culminated in Madrid after passing through Spain and Latin America.

On 16 November 2018, the group issued their latest album, Aeternus. On 9 October 2020, they announced Dani Pérez's departure and his replacement, Jorge "El Estepario Siberiano" Garrido.

On 5 November 2021, Saratoga released the album XXX.

In March 2023, the band announced that Jorge Garrido had decided to leave the band to focus on his YouTube channel and that Arnau Martí would be replacing him on drums. Jero Ramiro left in 2026 and was replaced by Charlie Parra. In April of that year, Saratoga released the album En estado puro.

== Band members ==
Current

- Niko Del Hierro – bass
- Tete Novoa – vocals
- Arnau Martí – drums
- Charlie Parra – guitar

Past

- Tony Domínguez – vocals (1993)
- Fortu Sánchez – vocals (1994–1996)
- Gabi Boente – vocals (1997–1998)
- Leo Jiménez – vocals (1999–2006)
- Tony Hernando – guitar (2007–2013)
- Marcos Parra – drums (1992)
- Joaquín Arellano (El Niño) – drums (1992–1998)
- Andy C. – drums, keyboards (2005–2013)
- Dani Pérez – drums (1998–2006, 2014–2020)
- Jorge "El Estepario Siberiano" Garrido – drums (2020–2023)
- Jero Ramiro – guitar (1992–2026)

== Discography ==
Studio albums

- Saratoga (1995)
- Tributo (1996)
- Mi ciudad (1997)
- Vientos de guerra (1999)
- Agotarás (2002)
- El clan de la lucha (2004)
- Tierra de lobos (2005)
- The Fighting Clan (2006)
- VII (2007)
- Secretos y revelaciones (2009)
- Némesis (2012)
- Morir en el bien, Vivir en el mal (2016)
- Aeternus (2018)
- XXX (2021)
- En estado puro (2026)

Live albums

- Tiempos de directo (2000)
- A morir (2003 )
- Revelaciones de una noche (2010)
- El Concierto de los Cien Duros (2014)
- Vuelve a Morir (15 Años Después) (2018)
- 22/10/22... La historia continúa (2023)

EPs

- En Acústico (1996)
- Heaven's Gate (2003)

Compilations

- Saratoga 1992–2004 (2004)
- Si no amaneciera (Baladas) (2011)
- Grandes Éxitos (2016)
- Cuarto de Siglo (2017)
