= Manuel Ramil =

Spanish musician (born 1978)

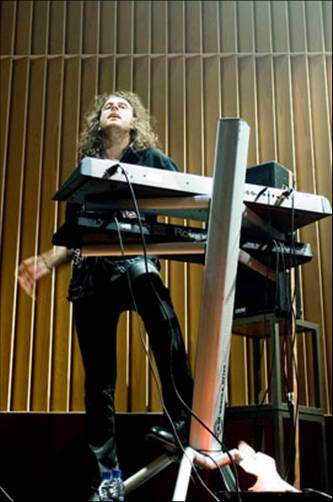

Background information
- Born: 8 March 1978 (age 47); Ares, A Coruña, Spain
- Genres: Power metal
- Instrument: Keyboards
- Years active: 1995 – present
- Labels: Avispa

Manuel Ramil (born 8 March 1978 in Ares, A Coruña, Spain) is a Spanish musician, best known as the former keyboardist for the Power metal band WarCry and Torquemada and as the current keyboardist of alternative/power metal band Sauze, formed by himself, along with Alberto Ardines, Fernando Mon, and Toni Amboaje. His influences are Dream Theater, Yngwie Malmsteen, Angra, Symphony X, Kamelot, Ark, and many more.

== Career ==
After going through several bands of unstable formation, in 1996 he formed the Heavy metal band Torquemada. A year later he recorded his first EP, Santa Inquisición.

He remained in the band for almost 6 years but in September 2001 he left the band. Also collaborated with some bands like Thánatos, recording diverse Intros for their concerts, and participated with the band Trashnos in the recording of their debut album Tiempo.

In all this time he extended his musical vision and began to feel specially attracted by bands like Dream Theater, Angra, Symphony X. Two months later, in December 2001, he decided to embark in a Progressive metal project called Fake Intermisión, which he still works on.

In July 2002 he went to Lugones to take a test as WarCry's keyboard-player, the band in which he worked until early 2008.

== Discography ==
=== Torquemada ===
- Santa Inquisición (1997)

=== WarCry ===
- El Sello De Los Tiempos (2002)
- Alea Jacta Est (2004)
- ¿Dónde Está La Luz? (2005)
- Directo A La Luz (2006)
- La Quinta Esencia (2006)

=== Sauze ===
- Nada Tiene Sentido

=== Projects and collaborations ===
- Fake Intermisión (2001–2003)
- Thánatos (Working in concerts)
- Trashnos - Tiempo (2001)

== Personal information ==
- Name: Manuel Ramil.
- Birthplace: Ares A Coruña, Spain.
- Date of birth: 8 March 1978.
- Instrument: Keyboard.
- In Sauze: 2008–present.
- Influences: Dream Theater, Yngwie Malmsteen, Symphony X, Kamelot.
- Formations: Sauze, WarCry, Fake Intermisión, Torquemada, Avalanch.
- First CD: Cassette - Yngwie Malmsteen - Odyssey/Whitesnake -1987

=== Faves ===
- Band: Dream Theater.
- Drink: Beer.
- Food: Italian Food.
- Film: Amadeus.
- Nonmusical Likings: Go To The Movies, Spend Time With His Family, And His 3 Crazy Nephews.
- Song: "The Spirit Carries On" - Dream Theater.
- Concert: Dream Theater Oporto (17 June 2002)
- Keyboardist: Jordan Rudess
