= Alberto Ardines =

Spanish musician (born 1970)

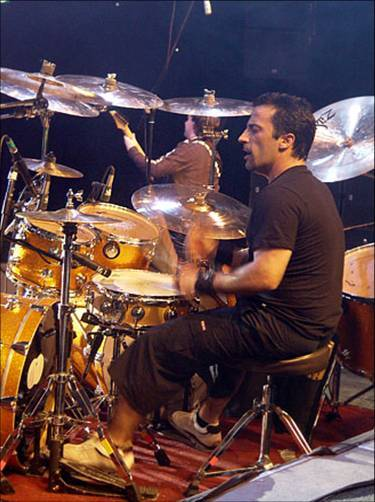
- Alberto Ardines in 2006

Background information
- Born: 4 July 1970 (age 56); Oviedo, Spain
- Genres: Power metal
- Instrument: Drums
- Years active: 1988–present
- Label: Avispa

Alberto Ardines (born 4 July 1970) is a Spanish musician. He is working on a new alternative/power metal band called Sauze that he formed with Manuel Ramil, Fernando Mon, and Toni Amboaje.

== Career ==
Born in Oviedo, when he was almost 12 years old, he started getting interested in music, but it was not until he was 14 that he discovered his passion for heavy metal. In 1989, he formed the band called Speed Demons with some friends from school. After changing the band's name for Avalanch and leaving back some friends with the ones he started recorded some EPs, he went to the recording studio to make his first album Ready To The Glory, which was released in 1992.

In 1996, he began taking drumming classes with Fernando Arias a wonderful drummer, who taught him some different styles. That same year he entered the school of music of Llanera, Asturias, where he spent two years studying drums and musical language. With influences from Dave Wake, or Mike Portnoy and classes given by his particular professor he became a great drummer. A year later, his dream started becoming true, when he participated in a tour around Spain, which continued until 28 December 2001.

Throughout this time, he was either or learning or touring, which was not easy. Because of all his perseverance, he has been classified as one of the best drummers of Spain. But he says "I still have to learn a lot, and a person gotta go step by step".

During 2001, in his free time, he started recording a project with his band companion Víctor García, who would receive the name of WarCry.

== Discography ==
=== Avalanch ===
- 1992 — Ready To The Glory
- 1997 — La Llama Eterna
- 1988 — Eternal Flame
- 1999 — Llanto De Un Héroe
- 2000 — Días De Gloria
- 2001 — El Ángel Caído

==== Tributes ====
- 1999 — Transilvania 666 (Iron Maiden)
- 2000 — The Attack of the Dragons (Queen)
- 2000 — Metal Gods (Judas Priest)

=== WarCry ===
- 2002 — WarCry
- 2002 — El Sello De Los Tiempos
- 2004 — Alea Jacta Est
- 2005 — ¿Dónde Está La Luz?
- 2006 — Directo A La Luz
- 2006 — La Quinta Esencia

=== Sauze ===
- 2008 — Nada Tiene Sentido

=== Last Days Of Eden ===
- 2015 - Ride The World
