= Avalanch =

Spanish heavy metal band

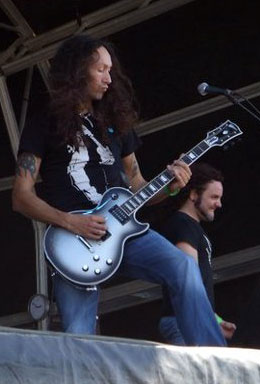

Background information
- Origin: Asturias, Spain
- Genres: Progressive metal Alternative metal Heavy metal Power metal Hard rock
- Years active: 1993–2012, 2016–present
- Members: Alberto Rionda; Manuel Ramil; José Pardial; Nando Campos; Bjørn Mendizábal
- Past members: Víctor García; Alberto Ardines; Roberto García; Fernando Mon; Juan Lozano; Roberto Junquera; Dany León; Fran Fidalgo; Marco Álvarez; Ramón Lage; Chez García; Jose Manuel Paz; Magnus Rosén; Israel Ramos; Alirio Netto; Dirk Schlächter; Jorge Salán; Mike Terrana

Avalanch is a Spanish heavy metal band formed in Asturias in 1993.

Led by composer, producer and guitar player Alberto Rionda, the band has released nine studio albums, plus a handful of compilations, DVDs and English versions of their works.

== Biography ==
Spanish band Avalanch combines power metal and progressive metal with elements of hard rock, pop and folk. Their albums are published in several European and American countries, and they mostly tour in Latin America. They have been described as one of the "leading" Spanish-language heavy metal bands.

== Discography ==
=== Studio albums ===
- La Llama Eterna (1997)
- Llanto De Un Héroe (1999)
- El Ángel Caído (2001)
- Los Poetas Han Muerto (2003)
- El Hijo Pródigo (2005)
- Muerte Y Vida (2007)
- El Ladrón De Sueños (2010)
- Malefic Time: Apocalypse (2011)
- El Secreto (Castilian version) / The Secret (English version) (2019)
- El Dilema De Los Dioses (2023)

=== DVD ===
- Cien Veces (2005)
- Lágrimas Negras (2006)
- Caminar sobre el agua (2008)

=== Compilations and re-recorded albums ===
- Eternal Flame (1998) (English version of La Llama Eterna)
- Mother Earth (2004) (English version of Los Poetas Han Muerto)
- Las Ruinas del Edén (2004) – Re-recorded songs.
- Un Paso Más (2005) – Greatest hits.
- Del Cielo a la Tierra (2012) - Greatest hits.
- El ángel caido (2017) - Re-recorded songs.

=== Live albums ===
- Días De Gloria (2000)
- Caminar sobre el agua (2008)
- Hacia La Luz - Directo desde Madrid (2018)

=== Demos ===
- Ready To The Glory

== See also ==
- WarCry
- List of bands from Spain
