= Avispa =

Spanish record label

- Avispa logo

Background information
- Genres: Heavy metal
- Website: AvispaMusic.com

Avispa (or Avispa Music per the URL) is a record label from Spain specializing in heavy metal; it is the largest Spanish company specializing in this type of music. When it was new, it was limited to the Spanish market, but it later launched itself internationally.

== Some artists ==
- Absolute
- Adagio
- Amistades Peligrosas
- Angra
- Arkania
- Avantasia
- Avatar
- Axxis
- Barón Rojo
- Breaker
- Cruachan
- Darna
- Dragonfly
- Edguy
- Europe
- Kotipelto
- Masterplan
- Medina Azahara
- Pyramaze
- Rata Blanca
- Rob Rock
- Saratoga
- Sauze
- Silver Fist
- Stravaganzza
- Theatre Of Tragedy
- U.D.O.
- WarCry
- White Skull
- Wereworld

== See also ==
- List of record labels
