= PledgeMusic =

Former online direct-to-fan music platform

- Website type: Direct-to-fan music platform
- Available in: English; French; German; Japanese; Spanish
- Founder: Benjie Rogers
- Industry: Crowdsourcing for musicians
- Website: Archived 2019-01-10 at the Wayback Machine
- Commercial: Yes
- Registration: viewing – no, selling/buying – yes
- Launched: August 2009; 17 years ago
- Current status: Bankrupt

PledgeMusic was an online direct-to-fan music platform, launched in August 2009. It was started to facilitate musicians looking to pre-sell, market, and distribute projects, such as recordings and concerts. It bore similarities to other artist payment platforms as ArtistShare, Kickstarter, Indiegogo, Patreon, RocketHub and Sellaband.

The company announced it was facing bankruptcy in May 2019, after a year of artists reporting slow payment problems. The company was granted permission to wind up on 19 August 2019.

== History ==
=== Formation ===
PledgeMusic was formed in the UK and registered with Companies House on 1 October 2008.

In the next few years, a number of complementary companies were also formed under the PledgeMusic banner. They were PledgeMusic Retail Ltd on 18 June 2009; PledgeMusic Recordings Limited on 18 August 2010 (originally named PledgeMusic 2.0 Limited); and PledgeMusic Publishing on 11 November 2010.

=== Early successes ===
Ginger Wildheart was awarded the 2012 Classic Rock Awards 'Event of the Year' award for his PledgeMusic campaign.

By 2013, roughly thirty artists who used the site had subsequently signed label recording contracts.

In 2014, PledgeMusic reported a 90% campaign success rate (higher than Kickstarter or Indiegogo), with most artists raising an average 140% of their goal. PledgeMusic and Lynda.com teamed up to produce a documentary about 'super fans' and their role in the future of the music industry. The documentary features footage and interviews from SXSW and interviews with artists such as Nicole Atkins and San Fermin.

=== Payment issues since 2018 ===
In early 2018, reports emerged of artists not being paid in accordance with their agreements with PledgeMusic. Also at that time, PledgeMusic's accounts for 2017 had not been filed with Companies House in the UK and by then were 4 months overdue. On 24 January 2019, PledgeMusic issued a statement via its blog page that claimed the company was having "discussions with several strategic players in the industry who have an interest in the PledgeMusic platform" and that it expects "payments will be brought current within the next 90 days."

On January 29, PledgeMusic founder Benji Rogers issued a statement saying he was returning to the company as "a volunteer strategic advisor and observer to the board." While the company was still working to "sort the back payments issue", Rogers claimed that "all funds coming into the company from now on will be managed by an independent third party (to be named soon)."

In February 2019, a company charge was placed on PledgeMusic by Sword, Rowe & Company LLC.

On May 3, a report was published in Digital Music News in which a leaked email was quoted, apparently sent from Robbie Wirdnam, an assistant manager at FRP Advisory LLP, who, according to the email, were due to be appointed as administrators for the winding up of PledgeMusic.com. The email was attempting to find potential buyers for all or part of the PledgeMusic business before selling off the company's assets.

=== Administration and liquidation: May to July 2019 ===
Benji Rogers, the company's co-founder, stated in a blog post dated May 8 that efforts to sell the company had failed and that "PledgeMusic will shortly be heading into administration". Rogers said that the crowdfunding platform had used money that was pledged for use by musical artists to pay off the company's debts instead. Many artists who pledged money through the website will most likely not receive the money that was promised to them. John Zorn is among the artists affected, who is owed $197,559, money which was pledged to help him finish his 25-year-long project, The Book Beriah.

On 9 May, Kevin Brennan, Labour MP, raised the question of musician and consumer protection in light of PledgeMusic's collapse, in Parliament.

By June 5, a number of trade bodies in the United Kingdom, including UK Music, had launched a survey to investigate the impact PledgeMusic's failure would have on the industry.

Sometime between July 13 and July 25, the PledgeMusic.com website became unavailable. The latest archived copy held by web.archive.org was dated July 13.

On July 31, a petition to wind up PledgeMusic.com was heard in the High Court of London. The petition was presented by Russell Rieger on behalf of the directors of PledgeMusic.com, who at that time were Russell Rieger, Joshua Sason, Donald Ienner, Daniel Rowe and David Walsh, and was granted on August 19.

=== Aftermath of insolvency and liquidation ===
PledgeMusic went bankrupt before John Zorn and hundreds of other artists were paid money owed via campaign pledges. In November 2019, Failure frontman Ken Andrews alleged PledgeMusic owed them $75,000 from their 2018 album campaign. Andrews further claimed that former CEO Dominic Pandiscia changed the company's policy of ring-fencing artists' money in 2016. Pandiscia denied the claims and mentioned considering legal action against Andrews.

In March 2020, the BBC reported that the band CC Smugglers lost £20,000 when PledgeMusic went bankrupt. It also stated the Insolvency Service was still investigating the company's insolvency.

By September 2021, a startup direct-to-fan site, Sonicly, had hired Benji Rogers as a consultant, in an attempt to avoid making similar mistakes as PledgeMusic. Sonicly plans not to hold any funds paid by fans; instead artists will be paid directly via Square.

== Business model ==
PledgeMusic considered itself a direct-to-fan platform as opposed to a crowdfunding website. Features that the site claimed distinguished it from similar competitors:

- Sole focus on raising funds for musicians
- Not retaining any ownership or rights to any music created through the platform
- Encourages artists to include contributions to charity
- Absorbs all transaction processing costs involved in pledging on a project
- Encourages artists to offer a wide range of incentives and exclusive content to fans
- No processing of any fund transactions until the fund target is reached
- International, accepting artists, projects and pledges from all over the world
- Pledger refunds

PledgeMusic had two distinct types of campaigns: direct-to-fan and preorder. In direct-to-fan campaigns, fans were not charged until the project target was reached. If a target was not reached, fans were not charged. In preorder campaigns, fans were charged immediately, and the artist was paid directly upon project completion.

=== Charity ===
PledgeMusic artists had the option of donating a percentage of their total or post-goal revenue to a charity of their choice. As of 2014, 67% of projects had been linked with a charity. Artists without a cause in mind were able to meet with the company's charity outreach specialist to pair them up with charities.

=== Critique ===
In 2010, while discussing the Digital Economy Bill Lord Errol, in the UK House of Lords, described PledgeMusic as a "rather clever idea" in the context of developing proportionate legal structures to protect copyright within the creative industry.

In June 2019, Musically reported that Kickstarter decided against launching a similar service due to being unable to find a sustainable business model that would support a high number of lower-volume creators.

== Campaigns ==
List of artists that used the site to raise money:

Release/End date	Artist	Type	Project title	Label	Ref	Note
October 22, 2016	Joe Hawley (Former member of Tally Hall)	Album	Joe Hawley Joe Hawley	Independent		
January 2019	OhGr	Album	Tricks	Independent		
2018	Failure	Album	In The Future Your Body Will Be The Furthest Thing From Your Mind			$75,000 allegedly withheld by PledgeMusic
2018	Neil Innes	Album	Nearly Really	Innes Music		£23,000 withheld by PledgeMusic
2018	Lucky Chops	Album				
2018	Bobby Long (musician)	Album	Sultans	Compass Records		
2018	John Zorn	Album (11 CDs)	The Book Beri'ah	Tzadik		Money withheld by PledgeMusic
October 2016	Sum 41	Album	13 Voices	Hopeless Records		
–	Shayne Ward	Album	Closer	PledgeMusic		

== Awards ==
PledgeMusic was nominated for:

- 2010 BT Digital Music Awards in the category "Best Innovation or Gadget".
- 2011 Music Week Awards in the category "Consumer-Facing Digital Music Service of the Year".
- 2011 BT Digital Music Awards in the category "Best Innovation or Gadget".
- SoundCtrl's 2013 Best in Artist Support award.
- American Association of Independent Music 2013 Annual Libera Awards (The "LIBBYs") 21st Century Award – celebrating the service provider or platform that was most beneficial to Independent labels and artists.

PledgeMusic was noted as one of Billboard's "Five digital startups to watch in 2013".

PledgeMusic won the Grammy Music Technology Lab in 2013.

Co-founders Benji Rogers and Malcolm Dunbar were named to The Hospital Club 100 list in 2013 in the category of Music.

Benji Rogers, founder and ex-president of PledgeMusic, won A&R Worldwide's International Music Industry Awards' Distinguished Digital Executive of the Year, 2014.

== See also ==
- Bandzoogle – similar services offered
- Crowdsourcing
- Comparison of crowdfunding services
- Fan-funded music
- Music 2.0
- Netlabel
- Social commerce
- Web 2.0
