= Osyrhianta =

Studio album by Fairyland
- Released: 22 May 2020
- Genre: Symphonic power metal
- Length: 57:05
- Label: Massacre

Fairyland chronology
Score to a New Beginning (2009)	Osyrhianta (2020)	The Story Remains (2025)

Singles from Osyrhianta
- 1. "Hubris Et Orbis" Released: 7 April 2020; 2. "Heralds of the Green Lands" Released: 21 April 2020; 3. "The Hidden Kingdom of Eloran" Released: 7 May 2020

Professional ratings
Review scores
Source	Rating
Metal.de	6/10
Metalitalia.com	7/10
Rock Hard	4/10
Sonic Perspectives	9/10

Osyrhianta is the fourth studio album by French symphonic power metal band Fairyland. It was released by Massacre Records on 22 May 2020. It is their final studio album with founding keyboardist Philippe Giordana before his death in 2022.

== Track listing ==
1. "The Age of Birth" – 2:57
2. "Across the Snow" – 5:17
3. "The Hidden Kingdom of Eloran" – 6:13
4. "Eleandra" – 4:08
5. "Heralds of the Green Lands" – 4:33
6. "Alone We Stand" – 4:40
7. "Hubris et Orbis" – 5:53
8. "Mount Mirenor" – 7:19
9. "Of Hope and Despair in Osyrhia" – 12:03
10. "The Age of Light" – 4:02

== Personnel ==
- Francesco Cavalieri – lead vocals
- Sylvain Cohen – guitars
- Willdric Lievin – guitars, bass
- Philippe Giordana – keyboards, backing vocals
- JB Pol – drums

=== Guest musicians ===
- Tony Rabusseau – additional vocals, guitars, bass, and keyboards
- Camille Dominique – violin, flute
- Dan Wilberg – narration on track 1
- Elisa C. Martin (Dark Moor) – vocals on track 4
- Victoria Cohen – vocals on track 10
- Flora Spinelli (Kerion) – vocals on track 10
