= Tarot (Dark Moor album) =

Studio album by Dark Moor
- Released: 21 February 2007
- Recorded: Late 2006
- Genres: Symphonic power metal, neo-classical metal
- Length: 58:50
- Label: Scarlet Records

Dark Moor chronology
Beyond the Sea (2005)	Tarot (2007)	Autumnal (2009)

Professional ratings
Review scores
Source	Rating
Rock Hard	3/10 stars
Metal.de	3/10 stars
Powermetal.de	
Vampster	
Noise.fi	2/5 stars
Heavymetal.dk	7/10 stars

Tarot is the sixth full-length album by the Spanish power metal band Dark Moor. The songs of the album are all named after the Major Arcana deck in the Tarot card game. The first single extracted from the album was "The Chariot". Manda Ophuis of Dutch band Nemesea is the guest female vocalist on Tarot. The final track, "the Moon", samples Ludwig van Beethoven's "Symphony No. 5" and "Moonlight Sonata". The bonus track, "Mozart's March" is based on Wolfgang Amadeus Mozart's "Rondo A'la Turca".

== Track listing ==
1. "The Magician" - 1:29
2. "The Chariot" - 4:20
3. "The Star" - 4:25
4. "Wheel of Fortune" - 3:55
5. "The Emperor" - 4:07
6. "Devil in the Tower" - 7:49
7. "Death" - 4:58
8. "Lovers" - 4:04
9. "The Hanged Man" - 5:27
10. "The Moon" - 11:28
11. "The Fool" [bonus] - 4:12
12. "Mozart's March [bonus] - 2:42

== Personnel ==
=== Dark Moor ===
- Alfred Romero - vocals
- Enrik García - guitars, orchestral arrangements, producer
- Daniel Fernández - bass
- Roberto Cappa - drums

=== Guest/session musicians ===
- Manda Ophuis - vocals
- Hendrik Jan de Jong - guitar
- Andy C. - drums
- Sincopa 8 - choir

=== Crew ===
- Derek Gores - artwork
- Luigi Stefanini - producer, recording, mixing, mastering
- Diana Álvarez - graphic design, band photography
