= In Control (Nemesea album) =

Studio album by Nemesea
- Released: June 21, 2007
- Recorded: Studio Spitsbergen, Netherlands, 2007
- Genres: Electronic rock, gothic metal, alternative metal
- Length: 33:51
- Label: Sellaband
- Producers: Hendrik Jan de Jong, Tony Platt, Ronald Prent, Bauke van der Laaken, Ronald Molendijk

Nemesea chronology
Mana (2004)	In Control (2007)	The Quiet Resistance (2011)

Professional ratings
Review scores
Source	Rating
Femme Metal	80/100
Metal Reviews	69/100
Sonic Cathedral	9/10
Sputnikmusic	3.5/5

In Control is the second studio album by the Dutch alternative rock band Nemesea. The album was recorded at Studio Spitsbergen, Netherlands. The album was mixed and mastered at Galaxy Studios, Belgium. Mixing was done by Ronald Prent and mastering Darcy Proper.

== Track listing ==
All lyrics are written by Manda Ophuis and Hendrik Jan de Jong; all music is composed by Hendrik Jan de Jong.

In Control track listing
No.	Title	Length
1.	"No More"	3:24
2.	"In Control"	3:00
3.	"Home"	2:43
4.	"The Way I Feel" (featuring Cubworld)	3:59
5.	"Lost Inside"	3:23
6.	"Remember"	3:35
7.	"Believe"	4:22
8.	"Like the Air"	2:49
9.	"Broken"	3:40
10.	"Never"	2:56

== Personnel ==
=== Band members ===
- Manda Ophuis – vocals
- Hendrik Jan de Jong – guitars, producer
- Martijn Pronk – guitars
- Sonny Onderwater – bass
- Steven Bouma – drums

=== Additional musicians ===
- Jake Kongaika (Cubworld) – male vocals on "The Way I Feel"
- Jeroen Reitbergen – additional keyboards on "Never"
- Hans De Wild – additional keyboards on "The Way I Feel"

=== Production ===
- Bauke van der Laaken, Ronald Molendijk – producers, engineers
- Tony Platt – producer
- Ronald Prent – producer, mixing
- Darcy Proper – mastering
