= Project X (Dark Moor album) =

Studio album by Dark Moor
- Released: 6 November 2015
- Recorded: 2015
- Genres: Symphonic power metal, neoclassical metal, hard rock
- Length: 46:05, 71:20 (with bonus CD)
- Label: Scarlet Records

Dark Moor chronology
| Ars Musica (2013) | Project X (2015) | Origins (2018) |

Professional ratings
Review scores
| Source | Rating |
|---|---|
| Rock Hard | 6.5/10 stars |
| Scream Magazine | 3/6 stars |
| Stormbringer.at | 3/5 stars |
| Dead Rhetoric | 7/10 stars |

Project X is the tenth full-length album by the Spanish power metal band Dark Moor, released on 6 November 2015.

Instead of being an album in which each song has its own concept inspired by classical themes and cultural legends, it is a science-fiction inspired concept album set in the year 3023. The album also cites influences of classic heavy metal and hard rock, similar to artists like Meat Loaf and Queen.

The deluxe Digipak edition includes a bonus disc containing re-recorded versions of five songs from the band's second and third albums, The Hall of the Olden Dreams and The Gates of Oblivion.

== Track listing ==
1. "November 3023" (Intro) - 1:07
2. "Abduction" - 4:43
3. "Beyond the Stars" - 4:58
4. "Conspiracy Revealed" - 3:07
5. "I Want to Believe" - 5:00
6. "Bon Voyage!" - 6:18
7. "The Existence" - 4:06
8. "Imperial Earth" - 4:30
9. "Gabriel" - 4:14
10. "There's Something in the Skies" - 8:05

=== Digipak bonus CD ===
Re-recorded versions of songs from Dark Moor's second and third albums

1. "In the Heart of Stone" - 4:40
2. "Maid of Orleans" - 5:03
3. "Nevermore" - 4:46
4. "A New World" - 5:54
5. "Somewhere in Dreams" - 4:51

== Personnel ==
- Alfred Romero - vocals
- Enrik García - guitars, orchestral arrangements
- Mario García - bass
- Roberto Cappa - drums

== Additional musicians ==
- Mara Boston - choir voice
- Luigi Stefanini - piano, synthesizer, hammond organ

== Other staff ==
- Luigi Stefanini - producer, mixing
- Gyula Havancsák - cover art
