= The Story Remains =

Studio album by Fairyland
- Released: 13 June 2025
- Genre: Symphonic power metal
- Length: 65:07
- Label: Frontiers

Fairyland chronology
Osyrhianta (2020)	The Story Remains (2025)

Singles from The Story Remains
- 1. "A New Dawn" Released: 7 March 2025; 2. "To Stars and Beyond" Released: 8 April 2025; 3. "Karma" Released: 13 May 2025

Professional ratings
Review scores
Source	Rating
Dead Rhetoric	8/10
Metal Express Radio	7.5/10
Metal.de	6/10
Metalitalia.com	6/10
Rock Hard	6.5/10

The Story Remains is the fifth studio album by French symphonic power metal band Fairyland. It was released by Frontiers Records on 22 May 2020. It is their first studio album without founding keyboardist Philippe Giordana who died in 2022. It is also their first album with keyboardist Gideon Ricardo, guitarist Brieuc de Groof, and vocalist Archie Caine.

A lyric video was made for "To Stars and Beyond", followed by a music video for "Karma".

== Track listing ==
1. "Downfall" – 1:52
2. "To Stars and Beyond" – 5:28
3. "Karma" – 4:17
4. "A New Dawn" – 4:50
5. "We Shall Hunt the Sun" – 0:54
6. "Hopeless Still" – 5:28
7. "Samsara" – 4:40
8. "Unity" – 5:30
9. "Council of the Gods" – 2:19
10. "The Chosen Ones" – 5:46
11. "Unbreakable" – 10:14
12. "Postscript" – 8:37
13. "Suffering Ages" (Hamka cover) – 5:12

== Personnel ==
- Archie Caine – lead vocals
- Brieuc De Groof – guitars
- Willdric Lievin – guitars, bass, backing vocals
- Gideon Ricardo – keyboards, backing vocals
- JB Pol – drums

=== Guest musicians ===
- Sylvain Cohen – guitar solo on track 2
- Connor McCray – guitar solo on track 4
- Patrick Rondat – guitar solo on track 8
- Elisa C. Martin (Dark Moor) – vocals on track 13
