= The Quiet Resistance =

Studio album by Nemesea
- Released: 17 November 2011
- Recorded: January–March 2011
- Studios: Kiksound Studios, Studio Lobbes
- Genres: Alternative rock, gothic rock, hard rock, heavy metal
- Length: 55:51
- Label: Napalm
- Producers: Hendrik Jan de Jong, Joost van den Broek

Nemesea chronology
In Control (2007)	The Quiet Resistance (2011)	Uprise (2016)

Singles from The Quiet Resistance
- 1. "Afterlife" Released: October 14, 2011; 2. "Whenever" Released: August 10, 2012

Professional ratings
Review scores
Source	Rating
Femme Metal	95/100
Metal Reviews	25/100
Metal.de	6/10
Sonic Cathedral	9/10

The Quiet Resistance is the third studio album by Dutch rock band Nemesea, released in 17 November 2011.

== Background and composition ==
After recording their then-untitled third album, Nemesea was signed to Napalm Records for a planned summer release for the album. The album title was revealed on 21 May 2011, and the cover artwork and track listing were unveiled on 10 September. A video teaser was released for the album on 30 September.

The album's first single, "Afterlife" was released on 14 October, with a music video released on 4 November. The Quiet Resistance was released in different European countries on varying dates from 17 to 21 November, and 22 November in North America.

The songs were mainly written lyrically by vocalist Manda Ophuis and compositionally by Hendrik Jan 'HJ' de Jong. Ophuis stated in an interview, "HJ (Hendrik Jan de Jong), our guitarist is the main song writer and he always has certain parts of songs written in a rapid tempo. The hardest thing for him is to finish the songs the way he wants and that’s always very time consuming. He’s a bit of perfectionist so... But I agree, some songs just come automatically and other need some more work."

== Track listing ==
All lyrics are written by Manda Ophuis and Hendrik Jan 'HJ' de Jong, except where indicated; all music is composed by Hendrik Jan 'HJ' de Jong and Nemesea, except where indicated.

No.	Title	Lyrics	Music	Length
1.	"The Quiet Resistance"	Gerben Verhaar	De Jong, Lasse Dellbrügge	0:52
2.	"Caught in the Middle"			4:50
3.	"Afterlife"			3:12
4.	"Whenever"			3:31
5.	"If You Could"			3:54
6.	"High Enough" (featuring Charlotte Wessels from Delain)			4:13
7.	"Say"			4:05
8.	"It's Over" (featuring Matt Litwin & Marcus Klavan from BulletProof Messenger)		De Jong, Nemesea, Matt Litwin	4:00
9.	"I Live"			4:31
10.	"Stay with Me"			3:49
11.	"Rush"			5:27
12.	"Release Me"			3:40
13.	"2012"			5:58
14.	"Allein" (Bonus track, featuring Heli Reißenweber from Maerzfeld)	Ophuis and Heli Reißenweber		3:58

== Personnel ==
Nemesea

- Manda Ophuis - vocals
- Hendrik Jan "HJ" de Jong - guitars
- Lasse Dellbrügge - keyboards
- Sonny Onderwater - bass guitar
- Frank van der Star - drums

Guest musicians

- Joost van den Broek - additional piano on tracks 5 and 9
- Gerben Verhaar - guest vocals on track 1
- Charlotte Wessels - guest vocals on track 6
- Matt Litwin (BulletProof Messenger) - turntables and strings on track 8
- Marcus Klavan (BulletProof Messenger) - vocals on track 8
- Heli Reißenweber (Maerzfeld) - guest vocals on track 14
