= Between Light and Darkness =

EP by Dark Moor
- Released: 28 April 2003
- Genres: Power metal, acoustic rock
- Length: 51:36
- Label: Arise Records

Dark Moor chronology
The Gates of Oblivion (2002)	Between Light and Darkness (2003)	Dark Moor (2003)

Between Light and Darkness is the second studio EP by the Spanish power metal band Dark Moor, released in 2003 by Arise Records. Released some months before Dark Moor, the EP consists of new acoustic songs as well as songs that had appeared as bonus tracks on Korean and Japanese versions of previous albums.

== Reception ==
Scream Magazine noted that Elisa C. Martin was present on the recordings even though she had left the band by then. The new songs were "great", but "a little unnecessary", warranting a 4 out of 6 rating. Asked the reviewer: "Who really cares about an acoustic version of Dark Moor? We want the metal version". The reviewer of Powermetal.de also found himself to "much prefer" the metal output of Dark Moor. The EP "only partially convinces this reviewer" and could mostly be recommended "to die-hard fans".

Another Norwegian magazine Exact gave 3 points, noting that the EP contained mostly familiar material, but the new songs were a bit more "symphonic and delicate", making the band stand out "from the mass of pompous, epic bands that exist out there".

Vampster stated that the string versions "suit the Spanish band quite well and are simply much more engaging than their rather monotonous melodic/speech material". With the second half of the EP being "what you'd expect from Dark Moor", this release was still "the most interesting one for me so far". Rock Hard gave a positive review with a 7.5 rating out of 10.

== Track listing ==
1. "Memories (Acoustic)" – 5:47
2. "From Dawn to Dusk (Acoustic)" – 5:05
3. "A Lament of Misery (Acoustic)" – 5:36
4. "Echoes of the Seas (Acoustic)" – 3:34
5. "Mistery of Goddess" – 5:30
6. "Shadow of the Nile" – 6:02
7. "Dies Irae (Orchestral Version)" – 9:32
8. "The Fall of Melnibonè" – 10:30
