= Uprise =

Studio album by Nemesea
- Released: April 29, 2016
- Studio: Giesound
- Genres: Alternative metal; alternative rock; electronic rock
- Length: 35:52
- Label: Napalm
- Producer: Joost van den Broek

Nemesea chronology
| The Quiet Resistance (2011) | Uprise (2016) | White Flag (2019) |

Uprise is the fourth studio album by Dutch alternative metal band Nemesea. For this album, one lyric video, one official music video, and an audio samples video have been released so far.

== Track listing ==
Standard Edition
| No. | Title | Length |
|---|---|---|
| 1. | "Hear Me" | 03:02 |
| 2. | "Twilight" | 03:31 |
| 3. | "Forever" | 03:48 |
| 4. | "Let It Burn" | 03:46 |
| 5. | "Time to Make It" | 03:16 |
| 6. | "Can't Believe It" | 04:10 |
| 7. | "Light Up the Sky" | 03:45 |
| 8. | "Get Out" | 03:12 |
| 9. | "Bones" | 03:58 |
| 10. | "Hold On" | 03:27 |
| Total length: | | 35:52 |

Deluxe Edition Bonus Tracks
| No. | Title | Note(s) | Length |
|---|---|---|---|
| 11. | "The Way I Feel" (Acoustic Version) | featuring Cubworld | 03:46 |
| 12. | "Broken" (Orchestral Version) | | 03:40 |
| 13. | "If You Could" (Acoustic Version) | | 03:55 |
| 14. | "No More" (Alternate Version) | | 03:24 |
| Total length: | | | 50:35 |

== Personnel ==
Nemesea

- Manda Ophuis – vocals, lyrics
- Sonny Onderwater – bass
- Hendrik Jan de Jong – guitars, keyboards, backing vocals, programming, lyrics, songwriting

Guest appearances

- Cubworld - male vocals on "The Way I Feel"
- Jasper Blokzijl - piano on "The Way I Feel"
- Dor Friedman - orchestrations on "Broken"
- Niels Lingbeek - songwriting on "Get Out"
- Jasper Dijkstra - backing vocals on "Let It Burn" and "Light Up The Sky"
- Jan Henk de Groot - backing vocals on "Let It Burn" and "Light Up The Sky"
- Freek van der Heide - songwriting on "Let It Burn"
- Jeroen Sjoers - songwriting on "Let It Burn"
- Steven Bouma - drums, percussion
- Ruben Wijga - piano on "Let It Burn" and "Light Up The Sky", programming
- Joost van den Broek - piano on "If You Could"
- Bas Veeren - programming on "No More"
- Guido Aalbers - programming on "No More"

Crew

- Stefan Heilemann – artwork, photography
- Dor Friedman – recording "If You Could"
- Ruben Wijga – programming
- Darius van Helfteren – mastering
- Guido Aalbers – producer, recording, engineering, mixing

Preproduction was done at Key Studios and Mastersound Studios
