= Of Wars in Osyrhia =

Studio album by Fairyland
- Released: April 21, 2003
- Recorded: 2001–2002
- Genre: Symphonic power metal
- Length: 60:52
- Label: N.T.S.

Fairyland chronology
Realm of Wonders (demo) (2000)	Of Wars in Osyrhia (2003)	The Fall of an Empire (2006)

Professional ratings
Review scores
Source	Rating
Heavymetal.dk	5/10
Pandemonium	7.4/10
RevelationZ	8/10
Rock Hard	4.5/10

Of Wars in Osyrhia is the debut album by Fairyland, released on April 21, 2003 by N.T.S. It was the only release of the band featuring the band's co-creator, bassist and songwriter, Willdric Lievin, before he came back in 2015, although he was a guest on the 2009 album Score to a New Beginning. The album has received mixed-to-positive feedback from reviewers for its "Rhapsodian Metal" sound, with some comparing it to Rhapsody of Fire and Dark Moor, with the latter band's ex-vocalist Elisa Martin providing lead vocals for this album.

== Track listing ==
All tracks written by Philippe Giordana and Willdric Lievin.

1. "And So Came the Storm" – 1:25
2. "Ride with the Sun" – 4:54
3. "Doryan the Enlightened" – 5:44
4. "The Storyteller" – 3:47
5. "Fight for Your King" – 5:44
6. "On the Path to Fury" – 5:37
7. "Rebirth" – 4:30
8. "The Fellowship" – 6:24
9. "A Dark Omen" – 5:57
10. "The Army of the White Mountains" – 5:59
11. "Of Wars in Osyrhia" – 10:51
12. "Guardian Stones" (Japanese bonus track) - 4:13
13. "The Fellowship (Remaster Demo Version)" (Korean bonus track) - 6:13

== Credits ==
- Elisa Martin – vocals
- Anthony Parker – guitars
- Willdric Lievin – guitars, bass, drums
- Philippe Giordana – keyboards, backing vocals
