= The Fall of an Empire =

Studio album by Fairyland
- Released: November 27, 2006
- Genres: Symphonic metal, power metal
- Length: 67:53
- Label: Napalm
- Producer: Fairyland

Fairyland chronology
Of Wars in Osyrhia (2003)	The Fall of an Empire (2006)	Score to a New Beginning (2009)

Professional ratings
Review scores
Source	Rating
Allmusic	2.5/5 stars
Metal Express Radio	9/10
Metal Storm	8/10
Metal.de	9/10
Rock Hard	6.5/10

The Fall of an Empire is the second album by Fairyland, released on November 27, 2006 by Napalm. The album has received mixed-to-positive feedback from reviewers for its "Hollywood metal" sound, with some comparing it to Rhapsody of Fire and Kamelot.

== Track listing ==
All music, lyrics, vocal lines and concept by Philippe Giordana.

1. "Endgame" - 1:16
2. "The Fall of an Empire" - 5:55
3. "Lost in the Dark Lands" - 6:01
4. "Slaves Forlorn" - 1:11
5. "The Awakening" - 4:50
6. "Eldanie Uelle" - 5:21
7. "Clanner of the Light" - 6:07
8. "To the Havenrod" - 1:05
9. "The Walls of Laemnil" - 5:57
10. "Anmorkenta" - 6:01
11. "In Duna" - 5:02
12. "The Story Remains" - 10:38
13. "Look into Lost Years" - 3:14
14. "Across the Endless Sea" (Japanese bonus track) - 5:31

== Credits ==
- Anthony Parker - guitars
- Philippe Giordana - keyboards, backing vocals
- Thomas Caesar - guitars, bass
- Pierre-Emmanuel Desfray - drums
- Maxime Leclercq - vocals

=== Guest musicians ===
- Emiliano Fernández - vocals on tracks 6
- Flora Spinelli (Kerion) - vocals on track 6 and 13
- Sarah Layssac - vocals on track 11
