= Score to a New Beginning =

Studio album by Fairyland
- Released: April 21, 2009
- Genres: Progressive metal, symphonic power metal
- Length: 50:13
- Label: Napalm

Fairyland chronology
| The Fall of an Empire (2006) | Score to a New Beginning (2009) | Osyrhianta (2020) |

Professional ratings
Review scores
| Source | Rating |
|---|---|
| Dead Rhetoric | 8/10 |
| Metal.de | 8/10 |
| Rock Hard | 6/10 |
| Sputnikmusic | 4/5 |

Score to a New Beginning is the third studio album by French symphonic power metal band Fairyland. It was released by Napalm Records on April 21, 2009 in Asia, April 29 in Finland and Spain, April 30 in Germany, Austria, Switzerland, Benelux, France, Italy, and Sweden, May 4 in the rest of Europe, and May 19 in the United States and Canada. The album was recorded by keyboardist and main composer Philippe Giordana as a solo project with various guests.

== Track listing ==
All songs written and composed by Philippe Giordana.

1. "Opening Credits" – 1:28
2. "Across the Endless Sea Part II" – 5:17
3. "Assault on the Shore" – 5:08
4. "Master of the Waves" – 6:08
5. "A Soldier's Letter" – 5:33
6. "Godsent" – 4:54
7. "At the Gates of Morken" – 4:53
8. "Rise of the Giants" – 4:19
9. "Score to a New Beginning" – 9:03
10. "End Credits" – 3:29
11. "A Soldier's Letter (Edit)" (Japanese and Korean bonus track) – 5:31

== Personnel ==
- Philippe Giordana – keyboards, acoustic guitars, compositions, concept, programming
- Gonzalo Ordóñez Arias – album art

=== Guest musicians ===
- Marco Sandron (Pathosray): Lead Vocals
- Georg Neuhauser (Serenity): Add. Vocals on tracks 2, 3, 5, 9, 10
- Flora Spinelli (Kerion): Lead Vocals on track 10
- Klaaire (Syrayde): Add. Vocals on tracks 4, 5, 9
- Geraldine Gadaut (Benighted Soul): Add. Vocals on track 7
- Jean-Gabriel Bocciarelli (Benighted Soul): Add. Vocals on track 7
- Fabio D'Amore (Pathosray, Serenity): Bass, Add. Vocals, Guitar Solo on track 6
- Willdric Lievin (Hamka): Drums, Choirs
- Chris Menta (Razordog): Rhythmic and Acc. Guitars, Guitar Solos on track 5
- Alessio Velliscig (Pathosray): Guitar Solo on track 2
- Alex Corona (Revolutions): Guitar Solos on tracks 3, 6, 9
- Olivier Lapauze (Heavenly): Guitar Solo on track 9
- Hugo Lefebvre (Anthropia): Guitar Solo on track 4
- Yann Mouhad (Anthropia): Guitar Solo on track 4
- Remy Carrayrou (Kerion): Guitar Solo on track 7
- Dushan Petrossi (Iron Mask, Magic Kingdom) – Guitar Solos
- Marc Rhulmann (Whyzdom): Keyboard Solo on track 9
