= Arm Yourself =

Studio album by BulletProof Messenger
- Released: January 30, 2009
- Recorded: 2008
- Genre: Alternative rock
- Length: 40:54, 44.30(LE)
- Label: Independent
- Producer: BulletProof Messenger

BulletProof Messenger chronology
The Crucial Line (2006)	Arm Yourself (2009)

Professional ratings
Review scores
Source	Rating
Melodic.net	4.5/5 stars

Arm Yourself is the second album of Long Island rock band BulletProof Messenger. This album crowdfunded through Sellaband. The album was recorded, engineered, and mixed by Anthony “Rocky” Gallo and mastered by Howie Weinberg at Masterdisk. The album was recorded in 2008 and released January 30, 2009.

== Track listing ==
All tracks are written by BulletProof Messenger.

No.	Title	Length
1.	"This Fantasy"	3:37
2.	"Move on"	3:22
3.	"Lose It All"	3:17
4.	"DLD"	0:53
5.	"Arm Yourself"	3:25
6.	"Control"	3:16
7.	"No Way Out"	5:32
8.	"Wasted"	3:25
9.	"Where We All Belong"	4:16
10.	"Grand Disaster"	4:02
11.	"Step Out"	5:51
12.	"Break Outside"	3:39

The song "Break Outside" is only available on the limited-edition version of this album.

== Personnel ==
- Marcus Klavan - Vocal
- Matt Litwin - DJ/Electronics
- Voley Martin - Guitar
- Alex Straiter - Drums
- Jesse Downing - Bass
- Scott Martin - Guitar
