= Mana (Nemesea album) =

Studio album by Nemesea
- Released: November 16, 2004
- Recorded: Frankie's Recording Kitchen, Studio Spitsbergen, Netherlands
- Genres: Symphonic metal, gothic metal
- Length: 46:26
- Label: Ebony Tears
- Producer: Hendrik Jan de Jong

Nemesea chronology
| Mana (2004) | In Control (2007) |

Professional ratings
Review scores
| Source | Rating |
|---|---|
| Femme Metal | 90/100 |
| Metal Storm | 9/10 |
| Metalfan.nl | 70/100 |
| Sonic Cathedral | 8/10 |

Mana is the debut studio album by the Dutch gothic metal band Nemesea, released in 2004. The lyrics detail different characters in songs such as "Nemesis", "Empress", "Lucifer", and the four-track suite "Mortalitas".

== Track listing ==
| No. | Title | Lyrics | Music | Length |
|---|---|---|---|---|
| 1. | "Nemesis" | Manda Ophuis | Hendrik Jan de Jong | 1:33 |
| 2. | "Threefold Law" | Manda Ophuis | Hendrik Jan de Jong | 3:44 |
| 3. | "Empress" | Manda Ophuis | Hendrik Jan de Jong | 4:25 |
| 4. | "Angel in the Dark" | Hendrik Jan de Jong | Hendrik Jan de Jong | 6:13 |
| 5. | "Mortalitas" (The Taker) | Hendrik Jan de Jong | Hendrik Jan de Jong | 4:49 |
| 6. | "Mortalitas" (Dies Irae) | Manda Ophuis | Hendrik Jan de Jong | 1:25 |
| 7. | "Mortalitas" (Moriendum Tibi Est) | Manda Ophuis | Hendrik Jan de Jong | 3:45 |
| 8. | "Mortalitas" (From Beneath You, It Devours) | Manda Ophuis | Manda Ophuis & Hendrik Jan de Jong | 3:36 |
| 9. | "Lucifer" | Manda Ophuis | Hendrik Jan de Jong | 4:16 |
| 10. | "Disclosure" | Manda Ophuis | Manda Ophuis & Hendrik Jan de Jong | 4:19 |
| 11. | "Beyond Evil" | Manda Ophuis | Manda Ophuis & Hendrik Jan de Jong | 3:53 |
| 12. | "Cry" | Manda Ophuis | Hendrik Jan de Jong | 3:01 |
| 13. | "Outro: Krad Eht Ni Legna (Dark Angel)" | | | 1:26 |

== Personnel ==
=== Band members ===
- Manda Ophuis - lead vocals, alto and soprano in the choir
- Hendrik Jan de Jong - guitars, voice and grunts, producer, strings and choir arrangements
- Martijn Pronk - guitars
- Berto Boijink - keyboards
- Sonny Onderwater - bass
- Chris Postma - drums

=== Additional musicians ===
- Peter van Dijk - voice on tracks 2 and 5
- Jeroen Kriek - vocals on track 5
- Ido Gerard Kampenaar - percussion

Strings

- Segei Arseniev - violin
- Jan Buizer - viola
- Sietse Jan Weijenberg - cello

Choir

- Judith Bouma, Saskia de Vries - sopranos
- Marieke Bouma, Mirjam Leentvaar - altos
- Gerard van Beijeren - tenor
- David van Royen - bass

=== Production ===
- Berthus Westerhuis, Bauke van der Laaken - engineers
- Klaas Pot - mixing
