= Man in Red Bandana =

2016 American documentary film by Matthew J. Weiss

- Directed by: Matthew J. Weiss
- Written by: Matthew J. Weiss
- Produced by: Matthew J. Weiss; Chad A. Verdi; Joshua Sason
- Edited by: Doug Forbes; Sam Eilertsen
- Music by: Mark Degli Antoni; David Bateman
- Production companies: Verdi Productions; Magna Entertainment; RDZ Prods
- Distributed by: Verdi Productions
- Release date: September 8, 2017
- Running time: 76 minutes
- Country: US
- Language: English

Man in Red Bandana is a 2017 American documentary feature about Welles Remy Crowther, an equities trader known for saving as many as 18 lives from the upper floors of the South Tower during the September 11 attacks in New York City, during which he lost his own life when the South Tower collapsed.

== Synopsis ==
Gwyneth Paltrow narrates the story of Welles Crowther, an equities trader known for saving at least ten lives during the September 11 attacks in New York City, during which he lost his own life. It includes interviews with Welles' parents and sisters, and many of the survivors whom Welles saved including Ling Young, Ed Nicholls, Donovan Cowan, Ron DiFrancesco, Richard Fern, Donna Spera and Kelly Reyher. It also includes interviews with former Fire Department of New York Commissioner Salvatore Cassano and architect Robert Siegel. Archival footage includes President Barack Obama at the World Trade Center Memorial's opening ceremony, honoring Crowther and introducing his mother to speak. Lyle Lovett arranged and recorded the film's original song "One Red Bandana", written by Stive Linek.

== Production ==
Production began on April 11, 2011 and was finished May 2017. It was written and directed by Matthew J. Weiss, produced by Weiss, Chad A. Verdi, and Joshua Sason, edited by Doug Forbes and Sam Eilertsen, and distributed by Verdi Productions. Its original score was composed by Mark Degli Antoni and David Bateman.

On April 30, 2015, Gwyneth Paltrow recorded narration for the film in Santa Monica, California. She learned afterward that her parents, writer-producer Bruce Paltrow and actress Blythe Danner, were friends with the Crowther family.

== Release ==
The film had its world premiere on September 6, 2017, at the Lafayette Theater in Suffern, New York. It opened theatrically on September 8, 2017.

== Reception ==
On Rotten Tomatoes the film has an approval rating of 63% based on reviews from 8 critics, with an average of 6.12/10.

Gary Goldstein of the Los Angeles Times called the film "a powerful and inspiring experience". Nick Schager of Variety said that, "Despite its frustratingly crude formal construction, [the film] proves an equally sorrowful and stirring portrait of selflessness in the face of tragedy". Frank Lovece of Film Journal International felt the "emotionally devastating documentary ... falls apart toward the end when it loses all objectivity and descends into hagiography."

== Accolades ==
The film won the Grand Prize in the Humanitarian Category at the 2017 Rhode Island International Film Festival and the People's Choice Award at the 2018 Niagara Falls International Film Festival.
