= Orion's Reign =

Greek metal band

Orion's Reign is a Greek symphonic power metal band. They have released two albums.

Their debut album Nuclear Winter came out in 2009, then saw a release through IceWarrior Records in 2010 with extra tracks. Using, strings and choirs, Orion's Reign performed "one anthem after another" with massive arrangements. Powermetal.de scored the album 8 out of 10.

Their second album Scores of War was released in 2018 by Pride & Joy Music. It featured guest vocals by Tim "Ripper" Owens, Mark Boals and returning collaborator Minniva Børresen as well as keyboards by Bob Katsionis. Scores of War received a 9/10 rating from Powermetal.de, with the reviewer praising both the guests and the main vocalist Daniel Vasconcelos, the "powerful drumming and outstanding guitar work". The songwriting was typical for symphonic power metal, including "massive, bombastic ballads", but still allowed Orion's Reign "to carve out its own identity".

Select songs from Scores of War were performed in symphonic versions and released as Symphony of War EP in 2019. In addition the EP contained a cover version of "Élan" by Nightwish. Later, Scores of War was also re-released in 2021. The artwork was the same, but the album featured two bonus tracks with guest vocals by Francesco Cavalieri (Wind Rose, Fairyland), the tracks being "Raining Blood" and "Dragonborn" from The Elder Scrolls V: Skyrim.

Orion's Reign also became known for releasing novelty Christmas songs as singles. These include "Carol of the Bells" from 2014, "A Lot to Be Done by Christmas" in 2023 and "O Come, All Ye Faithful" in 2025 featuring Fabio Lione. They also released ordinary album tracks as singles.
