= White Flag (album) =

Studio album by Nemesea
- Released: August 23, 2019
- Genres: Alternative rock; pop rock; hard rock; heavy metal
- Length: 49:28
- Label: Napalm
- Producers: Joost van den Broek, Guido Aalbers, HJ

Nemesea chronology
| Uprise (2016) | White Flag (2019) |

Singles from White Flag
- 1. "Kids with Guns" Released: June 24, 2019; 2. "Fools Gold" Released: July 23, 2019; 3. "White Flag" Released: August 20, 2019

Professional ratings
Review scores
| Source | Rating |
|---|---|
| Arrow Lords of Metal | 8.4/10 |
| Dead Rhetoric | 8.5/10 |
| Metal Hammer | 4.5/7 |
| Metal-Exposure | 7/10 |
| Metalfan.nl | 84/100 |
| Music in Belgium | 4.5/5 |
| RockZine | 4/5 |

White Flag is the fifth studio album by Dutch alternative rock band Nemesea, released on August 23, 2019 via Napalm Records. Lyric videos were released for a few songs from the album including the title track.

== Track listing ==
| No. | Title | Length |
|---|---|---|
| 1. | "The Storm" | 3:23 |
| 2. | "Kids with Guns" | 2:42 |
| 3. | "White Flag" | 3:29 |
| 4. | "Sarah" | 4:15 |
| 5. | "Don't Tell Me Your Name" | 3:16 |
| 6. | "Fools Gold" | 4:25 |
| 7. | "Ratata" | 3:23 |
| 8. | "Nothing Like Me" | 2:53 |
| 9. | "Lions" | 3:12 |
| 10. | "Heavyweight Champion" | 4:49 |
| 11. | "Rise" | 3:46 |
| 12. | "Let This Be All" | 3:40 |
| 13. | "Sayonara" | 3:08 |
| 14. | "Dance in the Fire" | 3:07 |
| Total length: | | 49:28 |

== Personnel ==
Nemesea

- Sanne Mieloo – vocals
- Sonny Onderwater – bass
- Hendrik Jan de Jong – guitars, keyboards, programming, backing vocals
- Mathijs van Til – keyboards
- Steven Bouma – drums

Crew

- Stefan Heilemann – artwork, photography
- Leonie Kuizenga – photography
- Darius van Helfteren – mastering
- Guido Aalbers – producer, engineering, mixing
- Joost van den Broek – producer, mixing
- HJ – producer, engineering
