= Bosley Crowther =

American film critic (1905–1981)

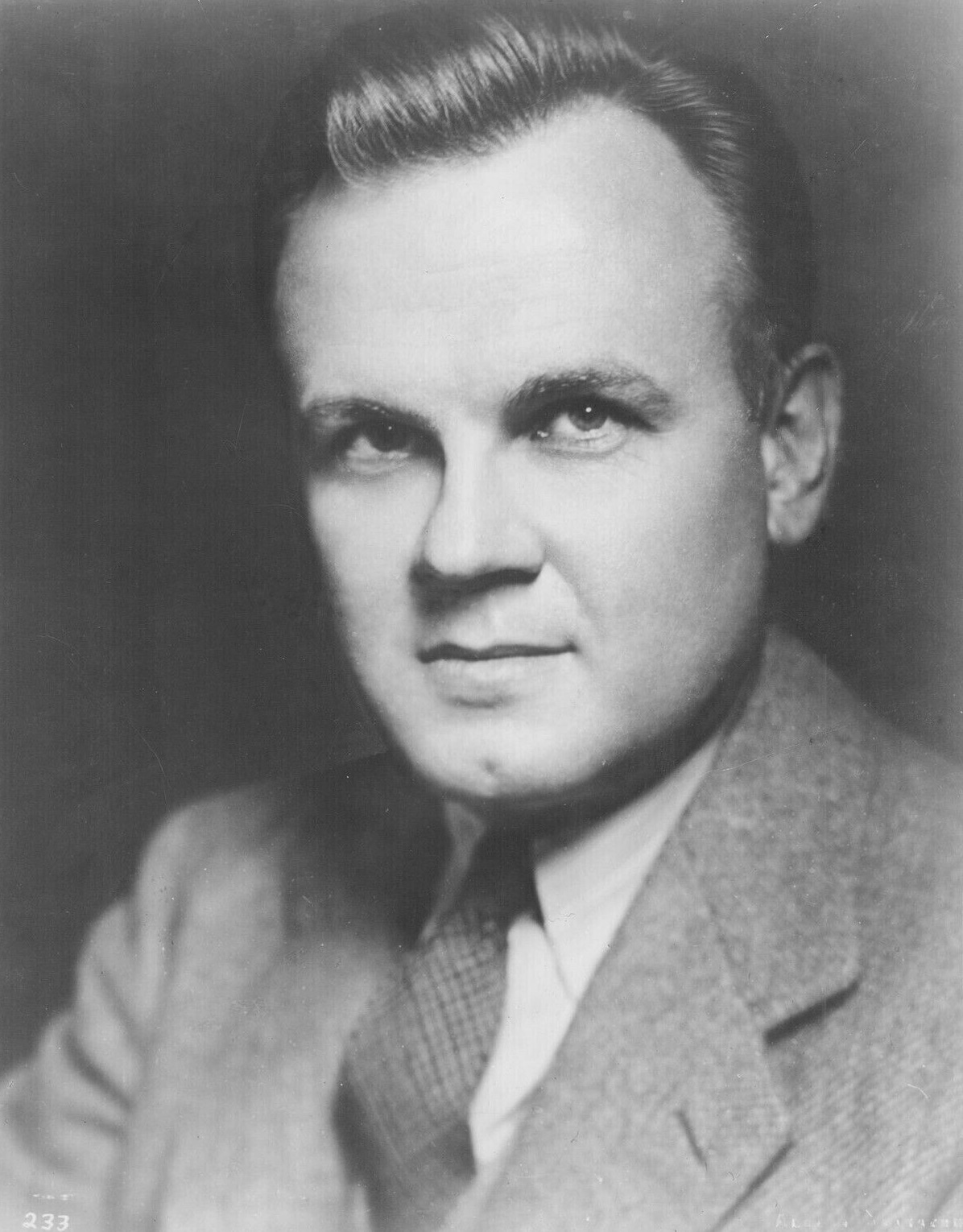
- Crowther in 1949
- Born: Francis Bosley Crowther Jr. July 13, 1905; Lutherville, Maryland, U.S.
- Died: March 7, 1981 (aged 75); Mount Kisco, New York, U.S.
- Education: Princeton University
- Occupations: Journalist, author, film critic
- Spouse: Florence Marks (m. 1933)
- Children: 3 (including John M.)
- Relatives: Welles Crowther (grandson)

Francis Bosley Crowther Jr. (July 13, 1905 – March 7, 1981) was an American journalist, writer, and film critic for The New York Times for 27 years. His work helped shape the careers of many actors, directors and screenwriters, though some of his reviews of popular films have been seen as unnecessarily harsh. Crowther was an advocate of foreign-language films in the 1950s and 1960s, particularly those of Roberto Rossellini, Vittorio De Sica, Ingmar Bergman, and Federico Fellini.

== Life and career ==
Crowther was born Francis Bosley Crowther Jr. in Lutherville, Maryland, the son of Eliza Hay (née Leisenring, 1877–1960) and Francis Bosley Crowther (1874–1950). As a child, Crowther moved to Winston-Salem, North Carolina, where he published a neighborhood newspaper, The Evening Star. His family moved to Washington, D.C., and Crowther graduated from Western High School in 1922. After two years of prep school at Woodberry Forest School, he entered Princeton University, where he majored in history and was editor of The Daily Princetonian. During his final year in 1928, he won The New York Times's Intercollegiate Current Events Contest and won a trip to Europe. Following his return, Crowther was offered a job as a cub reporter for The New York Times at a salary of $30 per week. He declined the offer, made to him by the publisher Adolph S. Ochs, hoping to find employment on a small Southern newspaper. When the salary offered by those papers was not half of the Times offer, he went to New York and took the job. He was the first nightclub reporter for the Times, and in 1932 was asked by Brooks Atkinson to join the drama department as assistant drama editor. He spent five years covering the theater scene in New York, and even dabbled in writing for it.

While at the Times in those early years, Crowther met Florence Marks, a fellow employee; the couple married on January 20, 1933. They had three sons, Bosley Crowther III, an attorney; John M. Crowther, a writer and artist; and Jefferson, a banker and the father of Welles Remy Crowther, who died in the September 11 attacks in 2001.

In 1937 he became assistant screen editor and in 1940 replaced Frank Nugent as film critic for The New York Times as well as screen editor. He was film critic for the Times until he semi-retired in 1967 and became critic emeritus. In 1954, he received the Directors Guild of America's first film criticism award.

After he semi-retired from the Times, he also started to work for Columbia Pictures helping them identify stories and films to buy. One of the stories he suggested was S. J. Wilson's To Find a Man.

In addition to his film criticism, Crowther wrote The Lion's Share: The Story of an Entertainment Empire (1957), the first book documenting the history of Metro-Goldwyn-Mayer, Hollywood Rajah: The Life and Times of Louis B. Mayer (1960), a biography of the head of the MGM studio, The Great Films: 50 Golden Years of the Motion Picture Industry (1967), and Treasury of the Talking Picture.

== Film criticism ==
Perhaps conscious of the power of his reviews, Crowther adopted a tone that New York Times obituarist Robert D. McFadden considered to be "scholarly rather than breezy". Frank Beaver wrote in Bosley Crowther: Social Critic of the Film, 1940–1967 that Crowther opposed displays of patriotism in films and believed that a movie producer "should balance his political attitudes even in the uncertain times of the 1940s and 1950s, during the House Un-American Activities Committee". Crowther's commentary on the wartime drama Mission to Moscow (1943), made during the period when the Soviet Union was one of the Allied Powers with the United States, chided the film by saying it should show "less ecstasy", and wrote: "It is just as ridiculous to pretend that Russia has been a paradise of purity as it is to say the same thing of ourselves".

In the 1950s, Crowther was an opponent of Senator Joseph R. McCarthy, whose anti-communist crusade targeted the State Department, the administration of Harry S. Truman, the U.S. Army, and individual government employees. However, he also criticised the left-wing film Knock on Any Door for blaming law-abiding society for a juvenile delinquent's descent into murder: "Rubbish! The only shortcoming of society which this film proves is that it casually tolerates the pouring of such fraudulence onto the public mind."

Crowther opposed censorship of films, and advocated greater social responsibility in the making of them. He approved of movies with social content, such as Gone with the Wind (1939), The Grapes of Wrath (1940), Citizen Kane (1941), The Lost Weekend (1945), All the King's Men (1949), and High Noon (1952).

Crowther barely concealed his disdain for Joan Crawford when reviewing her films, saying that her acting style in Female on the Beach (1955) was characterized by "artificiality" and "pretentiousness," and also chided Crawford for her physical bearing. In his review of the Nicholas Ray film Johnny Guitar (1954), Crowther complained that "no more femininity comes from (Crawford) than from rugged Mr. Heflin in Shane (1953). For the lady, as usual, is as sexless as the lions on the public library steps and as sharp and romantically forbidding as a package of unwrapped razor blades".

Though his preferences in popular movies were not always predictable, Crowther in general detested action and war films that depicted violence and gunplay. He defended epics such as Ben-Hur (1959) and Cleopatra (1963), but gave the World War II film The Great Escape (also 1963) a highly unfavorable review, and panned David Lean's later works. He called Lawrence of Arabia (1962) a "thundering camel-opera that tends to run down rather badly as it rolls on into its third hour and gets involved with sullen disillusion and political deceit."

Crowther often admired foreign-language films, especially the works of Roberto Rossellini, Vittorio De Sica, Ingmar Bergman, and Federico Fellini. However he was critical of some iconic releases as well. He found Akira Kurosawa's classic Throne of Blood (1957, but not released in the U.S. until 1961), derived from Macbeth, ludicrous, particularly its ending; and called Godzilla (1954) "an incredibly awful film". Crowther dismissed Alfred Hitchcock's Psycho (1960) as "a blot on an otherwise honorable career". After other reviewers praised the film, Crowther recanted his criticism and named it one of the top ten movies of the year, writing that Psycho was a "bold psychological mystery picture.... [I]t represented expert and sophisticated command of emotional development with cinematic techniques." He commented that while Satyajit Ray's Pather Panchali (1955; U.S., 1958) took on "a slim poetic form," the structure and tempo of it "would barely pass as a 'rough cut' with editors in Hollywood". Writing about L'Avventura (1960; U.S., 1961), Crowther said that watching the film was "like trying to follow a showing of a picture at which several reels have got lost."

The career of Bosley Crowther is discussed at length in the 2009 documentary film For the Love of Movies: The Story of American Film Criticism. The film includes discussions of his support for foreign-language cinema and his public repudiation of McCarthyism and the Blacklist. And it includes appearances of critics who appreciate his work, such as A. O. Scott, as well as those who found his work too moralistic, such as Richard Schickel, Molly Haskell, and Andrew Sarris.

== Bonnie and Clyde criticism ==
The end of Crowther's career was marked by his disdain for the 1967 film Bonnie and Clyde. He was critical of what he saw as the film's sensationalized violence. His review was negative:

It is a cheap piece of bald-faced slapstick comedy that treats the hideous depredations of that sleazy, moronic pair as though they were as full of fun and frolic as the jazz-age cut-ups in Thoroughly Modern Millie... [S]uch ridiculous, camp-tinctured travesties of the kind of people these desperadoes were and of the way people lived in the dusty Southwest back in those barren years might be passed off as candidly commercial movie comedy, nothing more, if the film weren't reddened with blotches of violence of the most grisly sort... This blending of farce with brutal killings is as pointless as it is lacking in taste, since it makes no valid commentary upon the already travestied truth. And it leaves an astonished critic wondering just what purpose Mr. Penn and Mr. Beatty think they serve with this strangely antique, sentimental claptrap.

Other critics besides Crowther panned the film. John Simon, the critic of New York magazine, while praising its technical execution, declared "Slop is slop, even served with a silver ladle." Its distributor pulled the film from circulation. However, the critical consensus on Bonnie and Clyde reversed, exemplified by two high-profile reassessments by Time and Newsweek. The latter's Joe Morgenstern wrote two reviews in consecutive issues, the second retracting and apologizing for the first.Time hired Stefan Kanfer as its new film critic in late 1967; his first assignment was an ostentatious rebuttal of his magazine's original negative review. A rave review in The New Yorker by Pauline Kael was also influential.

Even in the wake of this critical reversal, however, Crowther remained one of the film's most dogged critics. He eventually wrote three negative reviews and periodically blasted the movie in reviews of other films and in a letters column response to unhappy Times readers. The New York Times replaced Crowther as its primary film critic in early 1968, and some observers speculated that his persistent attacks on Bonnie and Clyde had shown him to be out of touch with current cinema and weighed heavily in his removal. Crowther worked as an executive consultant at Columbia Pictures after leaving the Times.

== Death ==
Crowther died of heart failure on March 7, 1981, at Northern Westchester Hospital in Mount Kisco, New York.

Media offices
Preceded by Frank Nugent	Chief film critic of The New York Times; 1940-1968	Succeeded by Renata Adler
