= Ars Musica (album) =

Studio album by Dark Moor
- Released: 18 June 2013
- Recorded: Late 2012
- Genre: Power metal, symphonic metal, neoclassical metal
- Length: 55:55
- Label: Scarlet Records

Dark Moor chronology
Ancestral Romance (2010)	Ars Musica (2013)	Project X (2015)

Professional ratings
Review scores
Source	Rating
Allmusic	3/5 stars
Rock Hard	3/10 stars
Metal.de	3/10 stars
Powermetal.de	5/10 stars
Kaaoszine	7/10 stars
Heavymetal.dk	3/10 stars
Dead Rhetoric	6.5/10 stars
Metal Hammer Norway	1/10 stars

Ars Musica is the ninth studio album by the Spanish power metal band Dark Moor, released on 18 June 2013.

== Track listing ==
1. "Ars Musica (Intro)" - 02:05
2. "First Lance of Spain" - 05:06
3. "This Is My Way" - 04:17
4. "The Road Again" - 04:34
5. "Together as Ever" - 04:53
6. "The City of Peace" - 04:08
7. "Gara and Jonay" - 04:27
8. "Living in a Nightmare" - 04:22
9. "El Último Rey" - 05:18
10. "St. James Way" - 04:07
11. "Asturias (Outro suite)" - 05:32
12. "The Road Again" (Acoustic version - Bonus track on some CDs) - 02:43
13. "Living in a Nightmare" (Orchestral version - Bonus track on some CDs) - 04:19

=== Japanese edition bonus disc ===
These tracks are orchestral versions of some songs including a bonus track.

1. "The Road Again (Acoustic version)" - 02:43
2. "Living in a Nightmare" - 04:19
3. "This Is My Way" - 04:06
4. "Together As Ever" - 04:15
5. "El Último Rey" - 04:38
6. "First Lance Of Spain" - 04:57
7. "Bohemian Caprice (Bonus Track)" - 02:51

== Personnel ==
- Alfred Romero - vocals & acoustic guitars
- Enrik García - guitars & piano
- Mario García - bass
- Roberto Cappa - drums

=== Additional musicians ===
- Berenice Musa - soprano voice
- Luigi Stefanini - piano on #03, hammond organ on #06

=== Production ===
- Luigi Stefanini - Producer
- Nathlia Suellen - Cover art
