= Cubworld =

Hawaiian singer-songwriter

- Origin: United States
- Genres: Acoustic, Ambient
- Label: Sellaband
- Members: Jake Kongaika
- Website: Official website

Cubworld (real name: Jake Kongaika) is a Hawaiian singer-songwriter and one of the first three artists to release their CD on the music website Sellaband with the raised US$50,000.

== Discography ==
- The Sample - 2000 (2006).
- Step Lightly (Create Out Loud) (2007).
- Life Is Music (2013).

== Guest appearances ==
- The Way I Feel (Available on Nemesea's 2007 album In Control)
- Sin City (Available on Maitreya's 2010 album. The track won New Zealand's Silver Scroll Maioha Award.)
