= Autumnal =

Studio album by Dark Moor
- Released: 24 February 2009
- Recorded: 2008
- Genres: Symphonic power metal, neo-classical metal
- Length: 47:22
- Label: Scarlet Records

Dark Moor chronology
Tarot (2007)	Autumnal (2009)	Ancestral Romance (2010)

Professional ratings
Review scores
Source	Rating
Melodic	2/5 stars
RevelationZ	6.5/10
Rock Hard	4/10; 7.5/10

Autumnal is the seventh full-length album by the Spanish power metal band Dark Moor. The album was released on 24 February 2009 and made available for streaming on MySpace until 4 March.

== Track listing ==
1. "Swan Lake" - 7:59
2. "On the Hill of Dreams" - 4:45
3. "Phantom Queen" - 4:03
4. "An End So Cold" - 4:00
5. "Faustus" - 4:08
6. "Don't Look Back" - 4:37
7. "When the Sun Is Gone" - 4:37
8. "For Her" - 4:37
9. "The Enchanted Forest" - 3:32
10. "The Sphinx" - 4:27
11. "Fallen Leaves Waltz" - 2:37
