= John M. Crowther =

American writer (1939–2018)

- Born: March 28, 1939; New York City, US
- Died: April 27, 2018 (aged 79); Los Angeles, California, US
- Education: Princeton University
- Occupations: Cartoonist, artist, writer, director
- Spouse: Carla Romanelli Crowther
- Parent(s): Bosley Crowther and Florence
- Relatives: Welles Crowther (nephew)

John M. Crowther (March 3, 1939 – April 27, 2018) was an American artist and writer known for the cartoons he produced for Mad magazine, oil portraits, and his writing for television and film.

== Career ==
Crowther was born to Florence and Bosley Crowther, a film critic for The New York Times. In 1957, he graduated from the George School of Bucks County, Pennsylvania, followed by Princeton in 1961. He studied art and theater in school, and had two successful performances on Broadway. His father's interest in Italian foreign films led him to furthering acting in Italy. In total he is credited with writing nine movies and television series; and at least six books. Outside of writing, Crowther performed in his biographical one-man shows that toured the United States called Einstein: A Stage Portrait. and taught painting with his wife in Tuscany, Italy. He was a member of the Portrait Society of America.

== Bibliography ==
=== Novels ===
- Firebase (1975)

=== Comics collections ===
- Out of Order: A Cartoon Odyssey (2008)
- Face Off (2012)
- Harley and Bear Going Nowhere Half Fast (2015)

=== Children's books ===
- How the Waif Bunny Saved the Boy (2009), illustrator
- The Man In the Red Bandanna (2013) written by Honor Crowther Fagan and illustrated by John M. Crowther, a story about his nephew Welles Crowther, a volunteer firefighter who died during the September 11 attacks

=== Illustrated works ===
- 101 Souls (2015)

== Plays ==
- Something About a Soldier 1962 (actor)
- The Martlet’s Tale (director)
- Affected Memories (writer)

== Films ==
- Kill and Kill Again (Writer), (1981)
- The Evil That Men Do (Writer), (1984)
- Missing in Action (Writer), (1984)
- Damned River (Writer), (1989)

== See also ==
- Robert Crumb
- Gary Larson
- Angus Oblong
- Marvin Townsend
- Gahan Wilson
