= Ancestral Romance =

Studio album by Dark Moor
- Released: 24 November 2010
- Genres: Power metal, symphonic metal, neo-classical metal
- Length: 50:23
- Label: Scarlet Records

Dark Moor chronology
Autumnal (2009)	Ancestral Romance (2010)	Ars Musica (2013)

Professional ratings
Review scores
Source	Rating
Allmusic	3.5/5 stars
Rock Hard	7/10 stars
Chronicles of Chaos	7/10 stars
Stormbringer.at	3.5/5 stars

Ancestral Romance is the eighth full-length album by the Spanish power metal band Dark Moor, released on 24 November 2010.

== Track listing ==
1. "Gadir" - 4:59
2. "Love from the Stone" - 4:02
3. "Alaric de Marnac" - 4:42
4. "Mio Cid" - 6:39
5. "Just Rock" - 2:35
6. "Tilt at Windmills" - 5:19
7. "Canción del Pirata" - 5:39
8. "Ritual Fire Dance" - 3:58
9. "Ah! Wretched Me" - 4:59
10. "A Music in My Soul" - 7:31

== External link ==
- Dark Moor official website

=== Further reading ===
- Review by Eternal Terror
- Review (archived) by Metal Cry (in Spanish)
