= Welles Crowther =

American financial worker, September 11 rescuer (1977–2001)

- Born: Welles Remy Crowther; May 17, 1977; New York City, U.S.
- Died: September 11, 2001 (aged 24); South Tower, World Trade Center, New York City, U.S.
- Cause of death: Collapse of 2 World Trade Center as part of the September 11 attacks
- Other name: The Man in the Red Bandana
- Education: Boston College
- Known for: Rescuing occupants of the World Trade Center during the September 11 attacks
- Relatives: John M. Crowther (uncle) Bosley Crowther (grandfather)
- Awards: Presidential Medal of Freedom (2026; posthumous)

Welles Remy Crowther (May 17, 1977 – September 11, 2001) was an American equities trader known for heroically stepping in to save as many as 18 lives during the September 11 attacks in New York City, during which he lost his own life in the collapse of the World Trade Center's South Tower. In 2006, Crowther was posthumously named an Honorary FDNY firefighter.

== Early life ==
Welles Remy Crowther was the first born of three children. His parents, Jefferson and Alison, raised him and his two sisters, Honor and Paige, in the New York City suburb of Nyack, New York. Through his father, he was a grandson of Bosley Crowther, film critic of The New York Times from 1940 to 1967. As a child, Crowther saw his father getting dressed for church and wrapping a small comb in a blue or red bandana he kept in his right hip pocket. When Welles was six years old, his father gave him a red bandana that would become Crowther's trademark, one that Crowther would wear under all his sports uniforms in high school.

At 16, Crowther joined his father as a volunteer firefighter, becoming a junior member of the Empire Hook and Ladder Company in Nyack. He later attended Boston College, where he played lacrosse. In 1999, Crowther graduated with honors with a degree in economics. He subsequently moved to New York City, taking a job as an equities trader for Sandler O'Neill and Partners, settling into an office on the 104th floor of the South Tower of the World Trade Center. He later entertained dreams of joining the FDNY, the FBI, or the CIA.

== September 11 attacks ==
On September 11, 2001, nine minutes after United Airlines Flight 175 struck the South Tower between floors 77 and 85 at 9:03 a.m., Crowther called his mother from his office at 9:12 a.m., leaving the message, "Mom, this is Welles. I wanted you to know that I'm okay." Crowther made his way to the 78th-floor sky lobby, where he encountered a group of survivors, including a badly burned Ling Young, who worked on the 86th floor in New York's Department of Taxation and Finance. Young had been among a group of people waiting at a bank of elevators to evacuate when the plane hit the tower, and was one of 17 survivors from at or above the impacted floors in the Twin Towers. Crowther, carrying a young woman on his back, directed them to the one working stairway. The survivors followed him 17 floors down, where he dropped off the woman he was carrying before heading back upstairs to assist others. By the time he returned to the 78th floor, he had a bandana around his nose and mouth to protect him from smoke and haze. He found another group of survivors, which included AON Corp. employee Judy Wein (who worked on the 103rd floor) in pain from a broken arm, cracked ribs, and a punctured lung. According to Wein, Crowther assisted in putting out fires and administering first aid. He then announced to that group, "Everyone who can stand, stand now. If you can help others, do so." He directed this group downstairs as well. As occupants of the tower headed for the street, Crowther returned up the stairs to help others. He was last seen doing so with members of the FDNY before the South Tower collapsed at 9:59 a.m.

A mostly completed New York City firefighter application was discovered in his home after his death. According to survivor accounts, Crowther saved as many as 18 people during the attacks.

Crowther's body was found in March 2002, alongside those of several firefighters and emergency workers bunched in a suspected command post in the South Tower lobby. The New York medical examiner's office said his body was found intact, with no signs of burns, and that authorities speculated that he was aiding the rescue effort as a civilian usher when the building collapsed.

Crowther's family was unaware of his actions between his last phone call to his mother and his death, until Alison Crowther read Judy Wein's firsthand account in May 2002 in The New York Times of being saved by a man in a red bandana. Alison then met with the people Welles had saved, including Wein and Young, and they confirmed his identity through photographs.

== Legacy ==
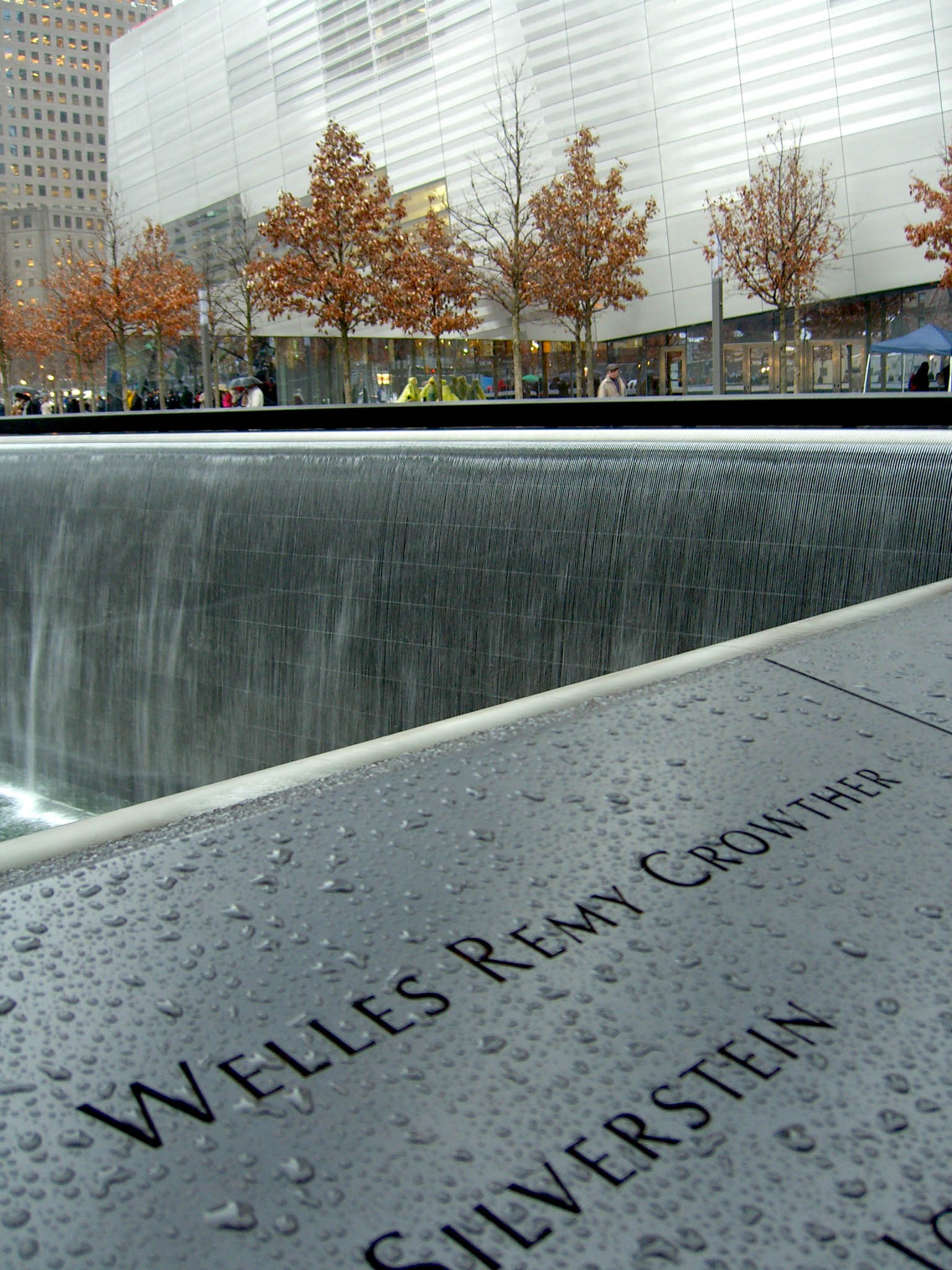
Crowther's name is located on Panel S-50 of the National September 11 Memorial's South Pool.

Crowther's parents, with the support of a Michigan foundation, created the Red Bandana Project, a character-development program for classrooms, sports teams, camps and youth programs. The family also established the Welles Remy Crowther Charitable Trust, which they use to fund charitable work.

The Welles Remy Crowther Red Bandana Run, a 5-kilometer road race, is held every October at Boston College.

In 2006, Crowther was posthumously named an honorary New York City firefighter by Commissioner Nicholas Scoppetta. That same year, Crowther's Boston College lacrosse teammate, Tyler Jewell, wore a red bandana in honor of Crowther when he competed as a member of the United States snowboarding team in the 2006 Winter Olympics.

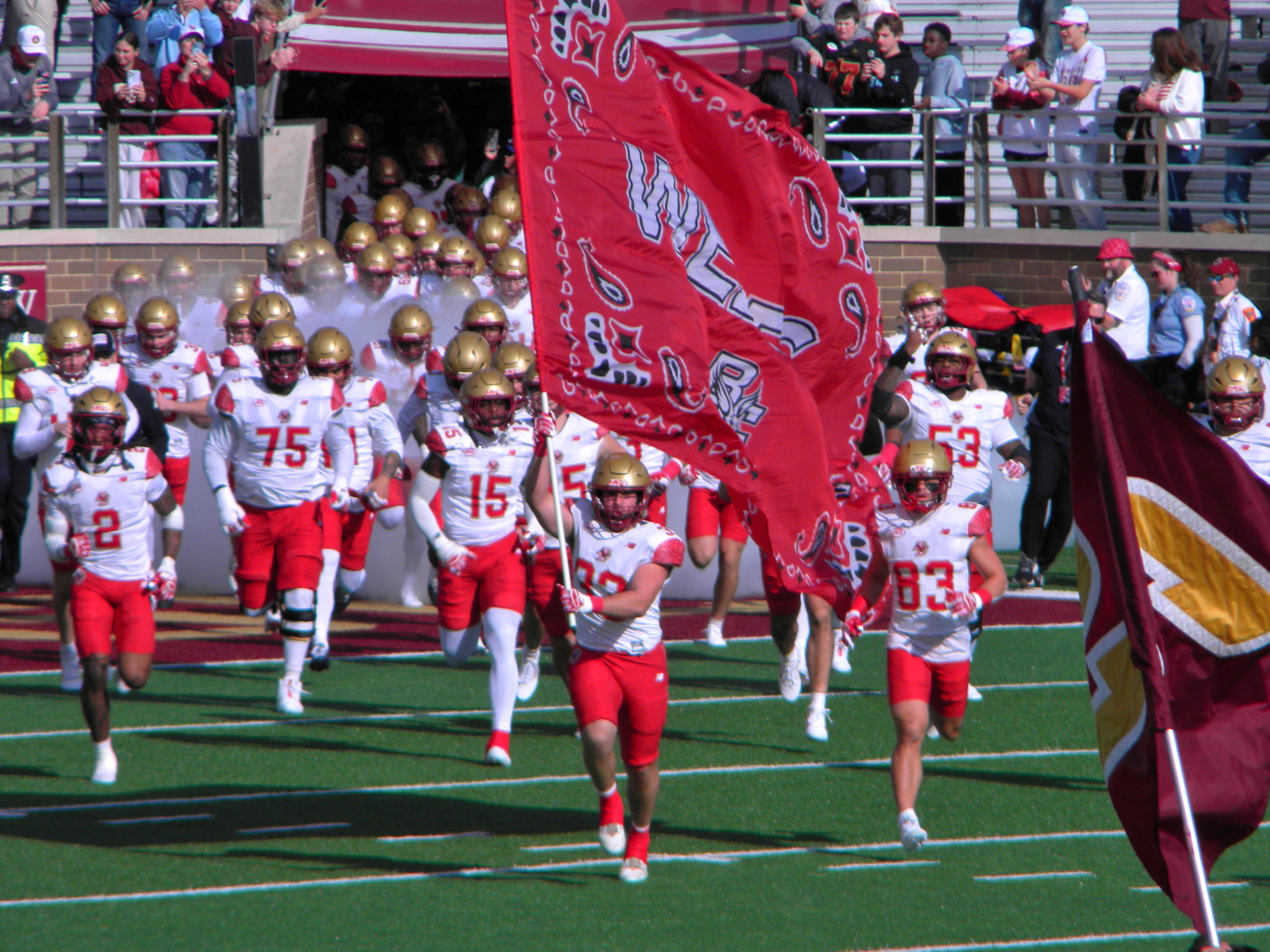
Boston College's football team wears red bandana uniforms once a year.

During a UCF-Boston College football game in Orlando, Florida, on September 10, 2011, (a day before the 10th anniversary of the September 11 attacks) both schools honored Crowther. Boston College players wore helmet stickers featuring Crowther's signature red bandana during the game, and Crowther's sisters, Honor Fagan and Paige Crowther, were introduced to the crowd during the third quarter. On September 13, 2014, Boston College played the University of Southern California (USC) and the team wore uniforms symbolizing Crowther's red bandana, including a helmet stripe, cleats and gloves with a red bandana pattern. Every year since 2014, Boston College has chosen one home football game to serve as the "red bandana game" with special red bandana-themed uniforms.

In 2013, Crowther's sister, Honor Crowther Fagan, published a children's book about Welles's actions during the September 11 attacks called The Man In the Red Bandana. It was illustrated by his uncle, John M. Crowther.

At the National September 11 Memorial, Crowther is memorialized at the South Pool, on Panel S-50.

President Barack Obama, during his May 15, 2014, dedication of the museum, said of Crowther, "They didn't know his name. They didn't know where he came from. But they knew their lives had been saved by the man in the red bandana. He called for fire extinguishers to fight back the flames. He tended to the wounded. He led those survivors down the stairs to safety, and carried a woman on his shoulders down 17 flights. Then he went back. Back up all those flights. Then back down again, bringing more wounded to safety. Until that moment when the tower fell." One of Crowther's bandanas is on display at the museum.

Welles Remy Crowther's bravery and selflessness have inspired numerous tributes. He was the subject of the 2017 feature documentary Man in Red Bandana. The film was narrated by Gwyneth Paltrow.

The Premier Lacrosse League's Welles Crowther Humanitarian Award is given to a player in the league who has made a meaningful impact in their community. Past recipients of the PLL's Welles Crowther Humanitarian Award include Lyle Thompson (2021, 2022) Eric Law (2023) and Romar Dennis (2024, 2025).

President Donald Trump meets Allison and Paige Crowther at an event commemorating the 25th anniversary of 9/11 in Washington D.C., where Welles was posthoumously awarded the Presidential Medal of Freedom (2026)

In 2024, Rockland County introduced a cyber detection dog named "Remy" in his honor. Remy, a black Lab trained to detect electronic devices used in criminal activities, wears a red bandana.

Aspire Park in Clinton, Tennessee, which opened in 2024, is home to a memorial statue dedicated to Welles Crowther.

In October 2025, Dropkick Murphys released a song about Crowther, "A Hero Among Many", on their album For the People. The song was released as a single and music video on November 7, 2025 and the video features images and footage of Crowther supplied to the band by his mother, Alison Crowther, and his friends Tim Epstein, Amy Dewhurst and Pat McCavanagh.

On September 8, 2026, Crowther was posthumously awarded the Presidential Medal of Freedom by President Donald Trump.

== See also ==
- Zhe Zeng
