= Beyond the Sea (Dark Moor album) =

Studio album by Dark Moor
- Released: 28 February 2005
- Recorded: May–October 2004
- Studios: New Sin Studios, M20 Studios
- Genres: Neo-classical metal, power metal, symphonic metal
- Length: 50:23
- Label: Arise Records
- Producers: Luigi Stefanini, Enrik García, Big Simon

Dark Moor chronology
Dark Moor (2003)	Beyond the Sea (2005)	Tarot (2007)

Professional ratings
Review scores
Source	Rating
Rock Hard	5/10 stars
Scream Magazine	3/6 stars
Powermetal.de	
Noise.fi	3/5 stars

Beyond the Sea is the fifth full-length album by Spanish neo-classical metal band Dark Moor.

Recorded in 2004, it was released in early 2005. It is the band's first record to feature new bassist Dani Fernández. The song "Beyond the Sea" was featured on a compilation in the memory of producer Big Simon.

== Track listing ==
1. "Before the Duel" - 3:50
2. "Miracles" - 6:11
3. "Houdini's Great Escapade" - 4:59
4. "Through the Gates of the Silver Key" - 0:52
5. "The Silver Key" - 6:15
6. "Green Eyes" - 4:36
7. "Going On" - 4:41
8. "Beyond the Sea" - 3:57
9. "Julius Caesar (Interlude)" - 2:23
10. "Alea Jacta" - 5:01
11. "Vivaldi's Winter (Bonus track)", (includes 2-minute silence and a hidden piano-only track) - 7:40
12. "Innocence" (Japanese bonus track) - 4:06

== Personnel ==
- Alfred Romero - vocals & choirs, acoustic guitars
- Enrik García - guitars, guttural voice
- Dani Fernández - bass
- Andy C. - drums, piano

=== Additional musicians ===
- Dobrin Ionela - choirs
- Mamen Castaño - choirs
- Nacho Ruiz - choirs
- José Garrido - choirs
- Kiko Hagall - choirs
- Marcial Ortiz - choirs
- Juan Vidal - choirs
- Elena Canales - choirs
- Lucia Ribera - choirs
- Tina Alonso - choirs
- Yolanda Alonso - choirs
