= Zhe Zeng =

Victim of 9/11 (1972–2001)

Zack Zeng
- Zeng in the 1990s
- Born: September 30, 1972; Guangzhou, Guangdong, China
- Died: September 11, 2001 (aged 28); World Trade Center, Manhattan, New York City, U.S.
- Cause of death: Collapse of 1 World Trade Center as part of the September 11 attacks
- Education: University of Rochester
- Employer: Bank of New York
- Known for: Acts of heroism during the September 11 attacks

Zack Zeng (September 30, 1972 – September 11, 2001), also known by his Chinese name Zhe Zeng (Chinese: 曾喆; pinyin: Zēng Zhé; Jyutping: Cang4 Zit3), was a Chinese American banker and volunteer emergency medical technician (EMT) known for providing aid to the injured at the World Trade Center site during the September 11 attacks in New York City, during which he died.

== Early life and career ==
Zeng was born on 1972 in Guangzhou. He attended Guangzhou No. 1 Middle School and in 1988, he immigrated to the United States with his parents. He completed his undergraduate and master's degree in business administration from the University of Rochester in 1998. In the same year, he joined the Bank of New York as an assistant treasurer at the bank's receipts depository division. During part time, he worked as a volunteer EMT with the voluntary ambulance in Brighton, New York.

== September 11 attacks ==
Zeng (left) aiding an injured person at the World Trade Center site during 9/11. This footage taken by WNYW-TV Fox 5 is the last known image of Zeng.

On September 11, 2001, Zeng was in his office at the Bank of New York building at 101 Barclay Street when the South Tower of the World Trade Center was struck by United Airlines Flight 175 at 9:03 a.m. As a result, he and other occupants in the Bank of New York building were forced to evacuate due to the building's close proximity to the World Trade Center.

Zeng, due to his EMT experience, collected medical supplies from his office and informed his colleagues that he was heading to the World Trade Center site to help the rescue workers and aid the injured. He called his mother and informed her that he was fine and he was going to save people, which would be his last words to her. Upon his arrival at the site, he was reported to be seen alongside firemen who were assisting two injured women to safety and appeared in the news footage of WNYW-TV Fox 5 on the area surrounding the South Tower minutes before it collapsed.

Zeng was killed as he was assisting people close to the North Tower of the World Trade Center when it collapsed at 10:28 a.m.

== Legacy ==
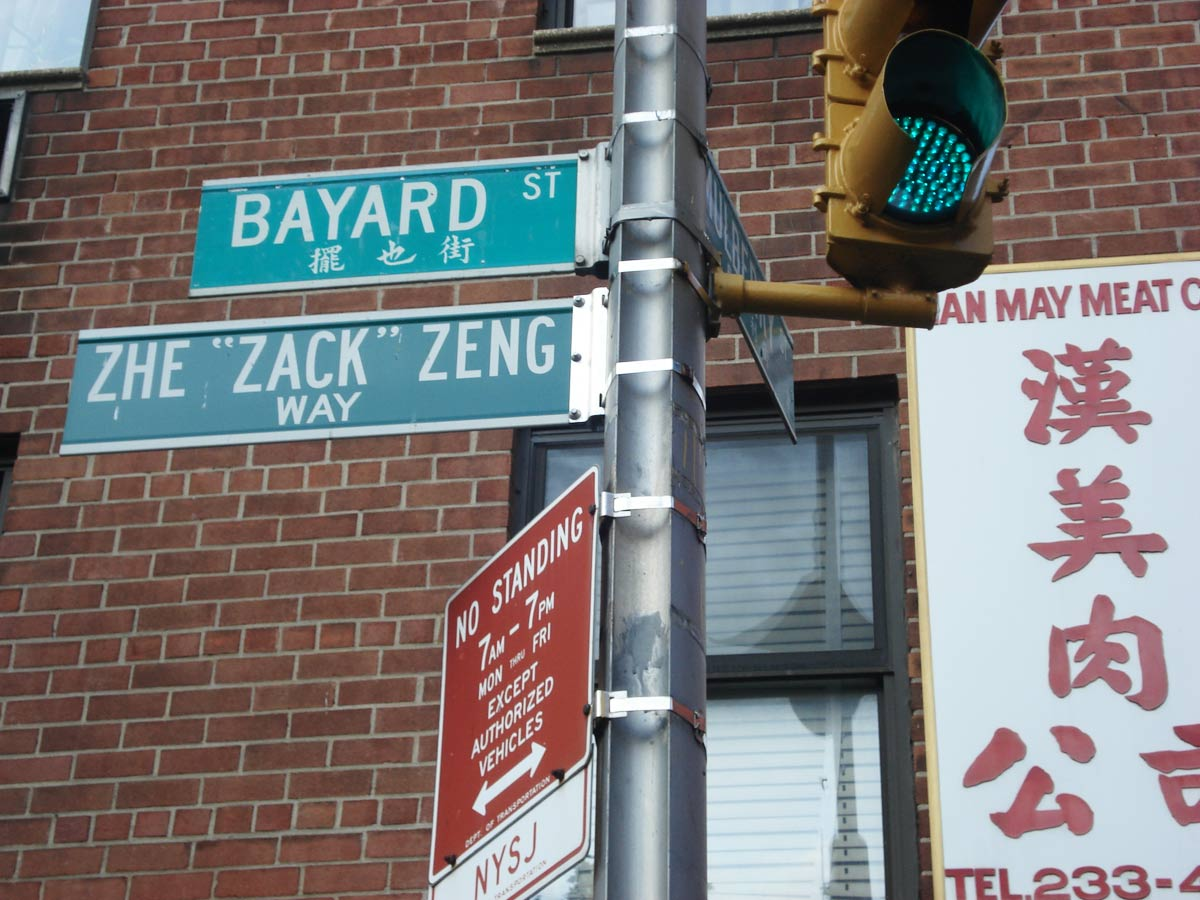
Zhe "Zack" Zeng Way at the intersection of Bayard Street and Mulberry Street in Chinatown, New York

In May 2002, he was posthumously awarded a certificate of commendation by the Governor of New York George Pataki.

Zeng's remains were recovered on May 18, 2002, and his funeral services were held on September 7, 2002, at Chinatown, New York, which was attended by more than 100 people, including then Chinese Consul General in New York Zhang Hongxi. During the funeral services, Timothy Kearney, a representative of Bank of New York announced that the bank would dedicate one of its conference rooms in Zeng's honor and would raise money every year for Brighton Volunteer Ambulance. Memorial services honoring Zeng were also held in Fengqing Shouyue Primary School and his alma mater No. 1 Middle School in Guangzhou where students were taught about his acts. He was survived by his older brother Zeng Shen and mother Cen Jiaoxian.

In December 2003, Manhattan Community Board #3 passed a motion to name a block in Bayard Street in New York's Chinatown as Zhe "Zack" Zeng Way. In 2016, the Brighton Volunteer Ambulance dedicated one of their ambulances in honor of Zeng.

A plaque honoring Zeng is placed on a patio at the Simon School of Business at the University of Rochester. At the National September 11 Memorial, Zeng is memorialized at the South Pool, on Panel S-37.

== See also ==
- Welles Crowther
