= Dark Moor (album) =

Studio album by Dark Moor
- Released: 24 November 2003
- Recorded: April–June 2003
- Studio: New Sin Studio
- Genres: Power metal, symphonic metal
- Length: 65:40
- Label: Arise Records
- Producers: Luigi Stefanini & Dark Moor

Dark Moor chronology
The Gates of Oblivion (2002)	Dark Moor (2003)	Beyond the Sea (2005)

Professional ratings
Review scores
Source	Rating
Rock Hard	5.5/10 stars
Scream Magazine	5/6 stars
Powermetal.de	
Vampster	

Dark Moor is the fourth full-length album of the spanish neoclassical power metal band Dark Moor.

Shortly before releasing The Gates of Oblivion, the band announced their split. Due to musical differences, Elisa C. Martín, Albert Maroto and Jorge Saez left the band, and formed Dreamaker. Enrik García and Anan Kaddouri remained with Dark Moor. Alfred Romero joined the band as the new lead singer. José Garrido (guitars) joined shortly after, followed by Andy C. on the drums.

The band traveled to Italy to record their self-titled album at the New Sin Studio. The album was recorded and mixed by Luigi Stefanini. It was produced by Luigi Stefanini and Dark Moor. All songs were written by Enrik García, and most of the lyrics were written by the lyricist Francisco José García.

== Track listing ==
1. "A Life for Revenge" - 5:48
2. "Eternity" - 4:23
3. "The Bane of Daninsky (The Werewolf)" - 5:30
4. "Philip, The Second" - 6:45
5. "From Hell" - 3:51
6. "Cyrano of Bergerac" - 7:41
7. "Overture (Attila part I)" - 2:48
8. "Wind Like Stroke (Attila part II)" - 5:16
9. "Return for Love (Attila part III)" - 4:19
10. "Amore Venio (Attila part IV)" - 0:55
11. "The Ghost Sword (Attila part V)" - 4:53
12. "The Dark Moor" - 8:36
13. "The Mysterious Maiden" (Japanese bonus track) - 4:55

== Personnel ==
=== Dark Moor ===
- Alfred Romero - lead vocals
- Enrik García - guitars, backing vocals
- José Garrido - guitars, backing vocals
- Anan Kaddouri - bass
- Andy C. - drums

=== Additional musicians ===
- Beatriz Albert - soprano on tracks 6, 10 & 12, and backing vocals
- Isabel García - piano, keyboards
- Mamen Castaño - backing vocals
- Valcavasia's Choir - choir
- Choir of Scciola Media "Montegrappa" di Romano D'ezzelino - choir
