= The Crucial Line =

Studio album by BulletProof Messenger
- Released: 2006
- Recorded: 2006
- Genre: Alternative rock
- Length: 49:18
- Label: Independent
- Producers: Matt Litwin & Voley Martin

BulletProof Messenger chronology
The Crucial Line (2006)	Arm Yourself (2009)

Music video
- "Wake Up Call" on YouTube

Professional ratings
Review scores
Source	Rating
Tunelabmusic.com	8.5/10 stars
alternativeaddition.com	4/5 stars
melodic.net	4/5 stars

The Crucial Line is the debut album of Long Island rock band BulletProof Messenger and was self released in October 2006. The album was recorded and engineered by Matt Litwin, Voley Martin and Bob Stander and mastered by Tony Dawsey at Masterdisk in New York, NY.

== Track listing ==
Music by Matt Litwin and Voley Martin. Lyrics by Matt Litwin, Voley Martin, and Marcus Klavan.

No.	Title	Length
1.	"Wake Up Call"	4:19
2.	"Can't Call It A Fall"	3:11
3.	"Bring Me To Life"	3:33
4.	"Best Of Me"	3:10
5.	"Heavenly Answer"	3:42
6.	"The Way"	3:53
7.	"Finest Hour"	3:30
8.	"11:59"	1:36
9.	"Tomorrow"	4:13
10.	"Save Me"	3:51
11.	"Awaken"	3:04
12.	"DTD"	3:52
13.	"The Truth"	3:26
14.	"Crucial Line"	3:58

== Personnel ==
- Marcus Klavan - Vocals
- Matt Litwin - Turntables/Programming/Beats/Guitar
- Voley Martin - Guitar/Bass/Drums
- Alex Straiter - Drums
