= BulletProof Messenger =

American rock band

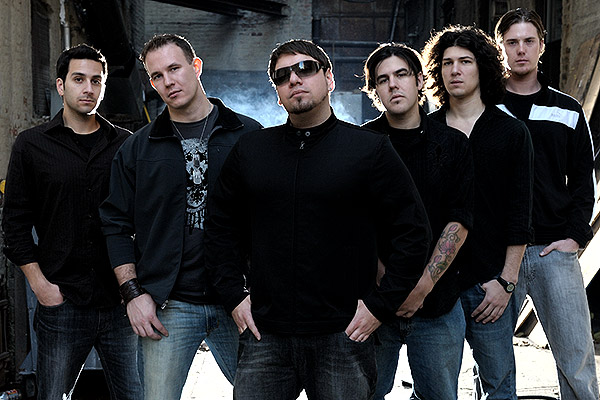
- Bulletproof Messenger - Left to right - Matt Litwin, Voley Martin, Marcus Klavan, Alex Straiter, Scott Martin, Jesse Downing.

Background information
- Origin: Long Island, New York, USA
- Genres: Alternative rock post-grunge
- Years active: 2001–Present
- Label: Independent
- Members: Matt Litwin; Voley Martin; Marcus Klavan; Scott Martin; Jesse Downing
- Past members: Josh Rieger; Jon Maisel; Marc (last name unknown); Alex Straiter; Vince Gorski III; Joseph Rubino
- Website: BulletProof Messenger

Bulletproof Messenger is a rock band from Long Island, NY.

== History ==
=== Formation and early years (2001–2005) ===
Prior to being named BulletProof Messenger (BPM), the group was originally named Gone To Earth (GTE). GTE was formed by DJ/Programmer Matt Litwin, bassist Josh Rieger and guitarist Jon Maisel in 2001.

Rieger and Maisel met while attending the same high school while Litwin joined the band through an introduction of a cousin of Rieger. Due to the band's use of programming and electronics it was a struggle to find a drummer who could keep up. After unsuccessfully auditioning multiple candidates, the band's drummer Voley Martin (current guitarist) was found in 2002 through an ad posted in a music store.

At this point the band still didn't have a vocalist and all of the music being played was instrumental. In Farmingdale, NY the band played an open mic at a venue called The Downtown in hopes of meeting a potential vocalist and after a few performances, paired with vocalist Marc (Last Name Unknown).

With Marc the band added vocals to some of the instrumental tracks and recorded a demo at a friend's local studio. Because of the success at the open mics the band was invited to be the opening act for Derek Sherinian at The Downtown in the summer of 2003. For this performance, most of the songs performed were instrumental while Marc joined later in the set to perform a few additional tracks.

However, a few months later Marc ended up parting ways with the group to pursue a different style project. As a result of Marc's departure the group began a search for a new vocalist. Making the search more difficult was that the group attended different colleges at the time. Litwin and Rieger attended Binghamton University, Martin went to SUNY Cortland and Maisel attended Miami University. The group was forced to try out potential vocalists through demo tapes sent via email or CD and writing new material came to a slow down. Over the next 2 years, Litwin and Martin spent time writing and recording parts of new songs sending each part back and forth over the internet to each other, piecing songs together part by part.

In November 2003 the band received an email from Marcus Klavan expressing his interest in the project. However, since Klavan lived in Maryland at the time the band sent him an instrumental track to prepare something to. Upon hearing his demo the band believed that he was the right person for the project. After some discussion the band met Klavan in January 2003 for a live tryout, after which the group decided to bring him on board as the group's vocalist.

During the 2-year period without a vocalist, Litwin and Martin had written a significant number of new instrumental tracks. With these instrumentals in hand, Klavan spent the next few months traveling back and forth between Maryland and Long Island to join Litwin and Martin in writing and recording vocals. Apart from the demo Klavan recorded over named “Eight” the first two tracks recorded as a group were entitled “Break Outside” and “Wasted” respectively - (“Wasted” appears on Arm Yourself). Also recorded over the following months were songs entitled “Everyone”, “And You Say” and “Like a Drug” (An updated version of which appears on Arm Yourself)

In the summer of 2004 Klavan relocated to Long Island. The band had rented a studio and began rehearsing on a daily basis. During this time the band was working on their live performance as well as writing some new songs including, “Next To Me” and a song entitled “Tomorrow” (which appeared on The Crucial Line).

Over the next few months the band played live at local venues including CBGB, The Crazy Donkey and The Knitting Factory. In October 2004 the band secured an opening slot with national rock act Incubus. This opportunity lead to spots on MTV, CBS, FOX, as well as being voted one of the top unsigned acts in the country by XM satellite radio.

In early 2005 the band was alerted about a Clear Channel Radio battle of the bands being hosted by 92.5 KGB-FM and "Magic City Music Hall” in Johnson City, NY. The band agreed to play the gig with the exception of Guitarist Maisel who declined to participate.

The band had wanted to move Martin to guitar and bring in a new drummer due to Martin's military obligations, as an attempt to prevent the band from coming to a standstill if he was deployed. Through Klavan's introduction, Alex Straiter, a friend from Maryland traveled to NY a few weeks before the show. Despite the last minute lineup change, the band went on to win the contest.

Straiter ultimately relocated to NY to be the group's full-time drummer and Martin took the role of the band's second guitarist. With the new lineup the band played shows with Collective Soul and Trapt in 2005.

In the winter of 2005 Maisel, upset with the groups refusal to sign a 3-song demo recording contract, attempted to bring the project to a standstill by sabotaging the band's MySpace page. Frustrated with this situation, Straiter left the band to play in a side project of From Autumn To Ashes guitar player Scott Gross. Rieger left the group to attend law school and Klavan's involvement decreased briefly, leaving Litwin and Martin to determine which way to go with the band.

=== Debut album The Crucial Line (2006-07) ===
To reset the project, Litwin introduced the potential name BulletProof Messenger, intended to be a play on the phrase "Don't shoot the messenger" and an easy to remember abbreviation (BPM).

With the new band name in place Litwin and Martin decided to self-fund their debut album The Crucial Line (an enhanced CD with video) and complete the group's lineup at a later date. Collaborating on the production of the new album over the internet, Litwin and Martin wrote over 25 songs using the same methods that worked for their earlier demo recordings – with Litwin coming home during college breaks to get together and finalize the tracks, as Martin had previously graduated.

Klavan returned to the group partially through the writing process and spent much of January and March 2006 writing and recording demo vocals in Litwin's home studio on the newly written tracks. The band (now with 3 members) continued work on the album until June 2006. By then the album had been almost completely recorded and produced at home by Litwin and Martin. At which time, the band relocated to a local recording studio "Vudu Studios" in Long Island, NY to record the final version.

The band headed into the studio and started the professional recording of The Crucial Line in June 2006 with Litwin and Martin personally financing the recording. The Crucial Line was produced by Litwin and Martin, and performed by Litwin, Martin – playing guitar, bass and selected drum parts (prior to Straiter's return), Klavan and Straiter - who rejoined the group towards the beginning of the recording process. Despite the majority of editing being done outside of the studio to manage the budget the project faced extremely high overages, causing a standstill in production. However, last minute financing was obtained to complete the album which was completed and mastered by Tony Dawsey at Masterdisk in New York, NY and released in October 2006.

The band spent months promoting the album via MySpace and targeting people with similar musical interests to review the album before it released. However, despite its positive reception the band's lineup had not been finalized.

Though the album was complete the band was still missing a bassist and a second guitarist. The group had tried out a number of potential bassists and guitarists during the recording process but found nobody suitable.

In November 2006 the band was introduced to guitarist Scott Martin through a potential bassist they had been trying out. Impressed by the speed S. Martin learned the tracks the group decided to bring him into the group. After two months of attempting to incorporate the bassist, Straiter mentioned that he knew a potential candidate, Jesse Downing, who he had played with through his side project.

Straiter contacted Downing who was living in Albany, NY at the time and presented 3 tracks for him to learn. Downing took a weekend trip to Long island and visited Litwin where he performed the 3 songs as well as the rest of the album. At that time the band was hesitant to remove the bassist they had been trying to break in, however upon a live tryout with the group a week later, the group decided Downing would be the perfect fit.

By the beginning of 2007 the band had a complete lineup.

In 2007 the band was practicing and performing around the East Coast of the US. During that time Downing received an email from Rob Parzek of Wetwerks (band) saying they had reached 15,000 dollars of investment on Sellaband, which he forwarded to the rest of the group.

After researching Sellaband and the site, the group decided it would be a good opportunity to fund the band's second album and a great opportunity to gain new fans worldwide.

On March 21, 2007, the band registered on Sellaband with their album The Crucial Line backing them. During this time The Crucial Line was receiving a great deal of attention and positive reviews from respected music sites such as “Tunelabmusic.com” and allowed the group to enter the top unsigned acts chart on MySpace.

Joining Sellaband in its infancy with a professionally recorded album, believers rapidly rallied behind the group. The band progressed extremely quickly, holding the number 1 position on Sellaband, based on money raised, for their first 3 weeks on the site. At that time Sellaband also announced their London Calling competition. Rallying all the fans they had made from The Crucial Line through MySpace and other outlets, the group earned a slot on the show.

The band was subsequently flown to London, England in June 2007 to perform at London Calling at Gibson Guitar Studios. Through the time of London Calling the band had progressed to approximately $17,000 in budget (out of the $50,000 required). After London Calling the band progressed rapidly to their $50,000 target. In order provide the greatest support for the release for their second album, the group attempted to rally the most believers of any Sellaband artist. To do, the band unexpectedly requested that believers limit their investments and delay reaching the $50,000 target.

On December 21, 2007, BPM hit the $50,000 target mark with 1171 believers. This is currently the highest number of believers any act on Sellaband.

=== Arm Yourself (2008 - present) ===
By this time, V. Martin had deployed to Fort Rucker, AL for Army flight training. Litwin and V. Martin had always been the writing team for the band. This, as well as the introduction of 2 new members caused a change in the writing structure for the new album Arm Yourself.

In March 2008, Litwin and Downing flew to Fort Rucker, AL for a week to work on the tracks for the new album. However, as was done for The Crucial Line, most of the tracks were written collaboratively by sending parts back and forth over the internet. Frequently, Klavan and Litwin joined to write and record vocals for many of the tracks while Klavan tracked the remainder at home. Upon V. Martin's return from flight school the group finished their writing process and chose the songs for the album.

In October 2008 the band began the official tracking of Arm Yourself at “The Cutting Room” in NYC. This album was self-produced and mixed by Anthony "Rocky" Gallo. Tracking was completed in early December 2008 and mastered a week later by Howie Weinberg at Masterdisk in New York, NY. Arm Yourself was released in January 2009.

In 2009, the song "Can't Quite Call it A Fall" was used as part of the soundtrack of the multiple-award-winning documentary, "The Invisible Ones: Homeless Combat Veterans" produced by Crystal Pyramid Productions in San Diego.

In early 2010, the songs "Arm Yourself", "Lose it All", "This Fantasy" and "Control" were featured in the video game Rock Band by Harmonix

Since the release of Arm Yourself, the band has continued to tour, performing with a number of regional and national acts including: Fuel, Seether, Everclear, Nonpoint, Cold, Drowning Pool, and Smile Empty Soul, to name a few.

In 2011, Matt Litwin and Marcus Klavan also made an appearance on It's Over, a track from the album The Quiet Resistance by the Dutch metal band Nemesea.

== Discography ==
Studio albums

- The Crucial Line (2006)
- Arm Yourself (2009)

=== Remix albums ===
2010 - "FiXT Remix vs. BulletProof Messenger"
