= Fairyland (band) =

French symphonic power metal band

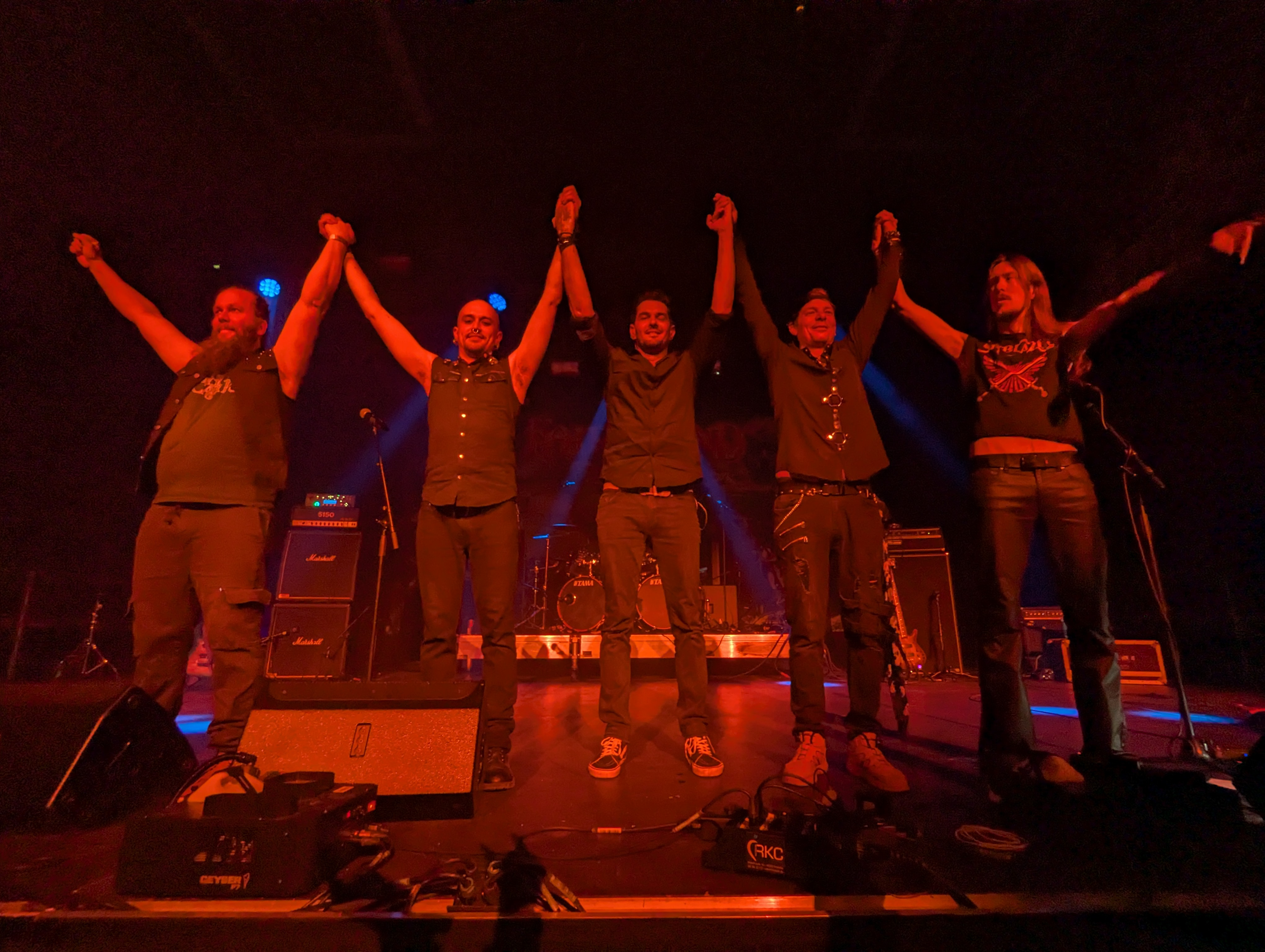
- Fairyland at Epic Fest 2026.

Background information
- Also known as: Fantasia (1998–2002)
- Origin: Nice, France
- Genre: Symphonic power metal
- Years active: 1998–2009, 2015–present
- Labels: N.T.S. (2003); Napalm (2006–2009)
- Members: Willdric Lievin; Archie Caine; Jean-Baptiste Pol; Sylvain Cohen; Brieuc de Groof; Gideon Ricardo
- Past members: Philippe Giordana; Thomas Caesar; Elisa C. Martin; Anthony Parker; Francesco Cavalieri; Max Leclercq; Pierre-Emmanuel Desfray; Marco Sandron

Fairyland is a French symphonic power metal band, created by songwriters Philippe Giordana and Willdric Lievin in 1998.

After going through several line-up changes in the 2000s, the band turned into a one-man musical project, when Giordana parted ways with the rest of the band in 2007. He subsequently released Score to a New Beginning in 2009 as Fairyland, with guest musicians and singers. In 2015, however, Fairyland became a band once again with a full line-up, including Lievin, returning for the first time since 2004.

== Biography ==
The band was created in 1998 as "Fantasia" by keyboardist Philippe Giordana together with bassist/drummer Willdric Lievin. The two musicians shared the same passion for epic and symphonic heavy metal. Following the release of their first demo, Tribute to Universe, their basic metal style began evolving into something more fantastic and symphonic, as in Realm of Wonders.

Through various metal contacts, Fantasia enlisted guitarist Anthony Parker (Heavenly) and soon gave up looking for a label to enter Wizard Studio in February 2002. During the recordings of their debut, the band began looking for a vocalist and they found Elisa C. Martin, already known for her work with the successful Spanish power metal band Dark Moor. Around that time, the band's name was changed to "Fairyland".

With their first full-length complete, they signed on with Denmark-based Intromental Management, and shortly thereafter secured a recording contract with the French label N.T.S. (now Replica Records).

Of Wars in Osyrhia was released in April 2003. The response from media and fans enabled the band to tour with Sonata Arctica in France, as well as to perform in the Sweden Rock Festival in 2003.

Internal band problems led to both Willdric Lievin and Elisa C. Martin leaving the band. The band continued on without them to finish the recordings for the new concept album The Fall of an Empire, again composed by Philippe Giordana and Anthony Parker, who had gathered a new line-up composed of vocalist Max Leclercq (formerly of Magic Kingdom), drummer Pierre-Emmanuel "Piwee" Desfray, and bassist Thomas "Tom" Cesario.

The unreleased album soon caught the attention of the Austrian-based label Napalm Records, who signed the band and released The Fall of an Empire in the fall of 2006, along with a re-release of Of Wars in Osyrhia. A European tour with Kamelot and Leaves' Eyes soon followed.

Shortly after the tour that followed the album, Philippe and the rest of the band parted ways. As the sole composer of Fairyland material, finding a new line-up would not pose much of a problem for Philippe Giordana. Yet after working on the new material, he decided to take a completely different approach by enlisting instead the services of guest musicians for his latest release. The album Score to a New Beginning was completed in 2009, keeping the same musical style of its predecessors.

In 2015, Fairyland reformed and became a full band once again, with Giordana being rejoined by Fairyland co-creator Willdric Lievin, who had left the band in 2004, and by new members Francesco Cavalieri, Jean-Baptiste Pol, and Sylvain Cohen. The group immediately went on to work on their next album. On May 31, 2016, the first song from the album, "Heralds Of The Green Lands", was released on YouTube. In February 2018, they revealed the tracklist for their next album, Osyrhianta, another concept album that will serve as a prequel to their original trilogy. On March 31, 2019, the band confirmed that the album was fully recorded and mastered, and would be released around November 2019. However on September 29, they stated that the band "had to rearrange release dates with regards to parallel releases", and would instead release Osyrhianta in early 2020. It eventually came out on 22 May.

Philippe Giordana, keyboardist and main composer of the band, died on October 21, 2022.

On March 6, 2023, Archie Caine was announced as the band’s new lead singer.

== Lineup ==
=== Current members ===
- Willdric Lievin - guitars, drums (1998-2003, 2009), bass, backing vocals (2003, 2015-present)
- Sylvain Cohen - guitars (2015-present)
- Jean-Baptiste Pol - drums (2015-present)
- Archie Caine - lead vocals (2023-present)
- Brieuc de Groof - guitars (2024-present)
- Gideon Ricardo - keyboards (2024-present)

=== Former members ===
- Philippe Giordana - keyboards, backing vocals (1998-2022, died in 2022), acoustic guitars (2007-2022)
- Thomas Caesar - bass (1998-2003, 2005-2007), guitars (2003)
- Elisa C. Martin - lead vocals (2003)
- Anthony Parker - guitars (1998-2007)
- Max Leclerq - lead vocals (2004-2007)
- Pierre-Emmanuel Desfray - drums (2004-2008)
- Marco Sandron - lead vocals (2009)
- Francesco Cavalieri - lead vocals (2015-2020)

== Discography ==
- Tribute to Universe (1998, demo)
- Realm of Wonders (2000, demo)
- Of Wars in Osyrhia (2003)
- The Fall of an Empire (2006)
- Score to a New Beginning (2009)
- Osyrhianta (2020)
- The Story Remains (2025)
