= Pathosray =

Pathosray is a progressive metal band based in Italy that formed in 2000. The band has released two demos and two full-length studio album as of 2009.

== History ==
Pathosray is an Italian progressive metal band founded in 2000, originally called N.D.E., by Ivan Monibidin (drums), Luca Luison (guitars), and Marco Sandron (vocals).

Their first demo, Strange Kind of Energy, was released in 2002 under their new name, Pathosray.

In 2006, the band's line-up changed; with Fabio D'Amore on bass and Gianpaolo Rinaldi on keyboards, the band published their second demo, Deathless Crescendo.

Their self-titled debut album, Pathosray, was made with new guitarist Alessio Velliscig and picked up by Intromental Management in Denmark. This led to a deal with the American-based record company Sensory Records, which released the album during the last quarter of 2007. In the January 2008 issue of renowned Dutch metal magazine Aardschok, the album received positive praise.

In May 2009, they released their second album, Sunless Skies.

== Discography ==
Demos

- Strange Kind of Energy (2002)
- Deathly Crescendo (2006)

Albums

- Pathosray (2007)
- Sunless Skies (2009)

== Band members ==
- Ivan Moni Bidin (drums)
- Fabio D'Amore (bass)
- Marco Sandron (vocals)
- Gianpaolo Rinaldi (keyboards)
- Alessio Velliscig (guitar)

== Online reviews ==
- Pathosray at AllMusic
