= Shadowland (Dark Moor album) =

Studio album by Dark Moor
- Released: 12 December 1999
- Recorded: September–October 1999
- Genre: Power metal, symphonic metal
- Length: 54:18
- Label: Arise

Dark Moor chronology
Shadowland (1999)	The Hall of the Olden Dreams (2000)

Professional ratings
Review scores
Source	Rating
Rock Hard	6/10 stars
Powermetal.de	
Vampster	

Shadowland is Dark Moor's first album released in 1999 by Arise Records.

== Track listing ==
1. "Shadowland" – 0:36
2. "Walhalla" – 6:57
3. "Dragon into the Fire" – 5:05
4. "Calling On the Wind" – 5:04
5. "Magic Land" – 4:58
6. "Flying" – 6:40
7. "Time Is the Avenger" – 7:11
8. "Born in the Dark" – 5:06
9. "The King’s Sword" – 5:50
10. "The Call" – 6:51

Bonus tracks from demos:

1. "Intro: God Save The King" - 0:42
2. "Valhalla" - 7:14
3. "Flying" - 6:38
4. "For You" - 6:32
5. "Infinite Dreams" - 5:01
6. "Dreams of Madness" - 6:22
7. "Time Is the Avenger" - 7:28
8. "The King's Sword" - 4:54

== Credits ==
- Elisa Martin – Vocals
- Enrik Garcia – Guitar
- Albert Maroto – Guitar
- Anan Kaddouri – Bass
- Roberto Peña De Camus – Keyboards
- Jorge Saez – Drums
- Produced by Dark Moor, Chema and Javi M.
- Engineered by Chema
- Recorded and mixed at NC Studios
- Mastered at T.S.S. Studios
