= Elisa Martin =

Spanish singer (born 1972)

Elisa C. Martin
- Born: 3 August 1972 (age 54)
- Genres: Power metal, Symphonic metal
- Occupation: Singer
- Instrument: Vocals
- Years active: 1994–present
- Website: https://elisacmartin.com/

Elisa C. Martin (born 3 August 1972) is a Spanish singer. She has served as a vocalist in several European power metal bands, including Dark Moor, Dreamaker, and Fairyland.

== Career ==
Elisa started singing in metal bands when she was only 12 years old. She formed a few Spanish bands: Necrópolis, Five Cross and Sabatan, which she recorded two E.P's for in 1994, but the band split up and Elisa entered Dark Moor.

With Dark Moor she recorded two demos until 1997, when the band signed a contract with the Spanish label ‘Arise Records’ and recorded their first album Shadowland.

In 1998 the second album The Hall of the Olden Dreams was released and in the same year she recorded an EP The Fall of Melnibone, which features unpublished songs, covers from other bands and bonus tracks from Japan.

In 2002, she recorded a new CD called The Gates of Oblivion and a few months later she joined the young French band Fairyland as their special guest in their debut album. Elisa accepted their offer to join the band and in 2003 she recorded her first album with ‘Fairyland’ called Of Wars in Osyrhia, published for the French label ‘NTS’. Elisa came back to Spain and recorded the E.P Between Light and Darkness with Dark Moor. It was the last album she would record with Dark Moor before the band split up.

Subsequently, three of Dark Moor's ex-members formed her recent band called Dreamaker, which she recorded the albums called Human Device (2004) and Enclosed (2005) with. Dreamaker officially split up in 2011.

Since mid-2007, she has been with another power metal band called Hamka, with whom Elisa has released two albums.

In 2018, Elisa published her autobiography, "My life: from delinquency to heavy metal", written in Spanish.

At present she is a Vocal Coach in Calafell, Tarragona.

== Private life ==
In 2021 she announced that she and her partner of ten years were going to be mothers.
