= Joshua Sason =

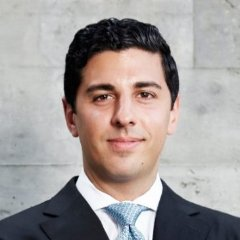
- Born: Plainview, New York, U.S.
- Citizenship: United States
- Occupation: Founder & CEO of Magna

Joshua Sason is an American entrepreneur, investor, and entertainment producer. He is the founder and chief executive officer of Magna, a global investment firm based in New York City.

== Overview ==
Sason founded Magna, a New York-based investment firm, in 2009. The firm now operates three investment platforms – Magna Equities, Magna Ventures, and Magna Entertainment – focused on direct investments into public companies, private ventures, and entertainment productions and businesses, respectively. According to its website, the firm has invested more than $200 million in public equities since its inception in 2009.

Sason is a benefactor to community organizations near Long Island, New York. On June 16, 2014, Sason was honored at the Mid-Island Y Jewish Community Center's 13th Annual Golf Outing at Glen Head Country Club in Glen Head, New York. Sason is the executive producer of three feature films. His most recent production was The 50 Year Argument, a feature documentary co-directed by Martin Scorsese. Sason is the executive producer of Bleed for This, a film based on the true story of world-champion boxer Vinny Pazienza, which began production in November 2014.

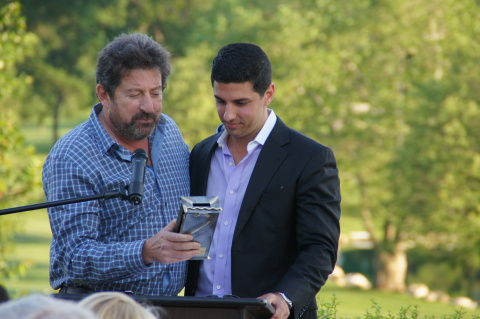
Al Berg (left), CEO of Marchon Eyewear and Vice President of the MIY JCC's Board of Directors, presented Sason with a handcrafted tzedakah box in honor of his key role in the continued success and growth of the organization.

== Filmography ==
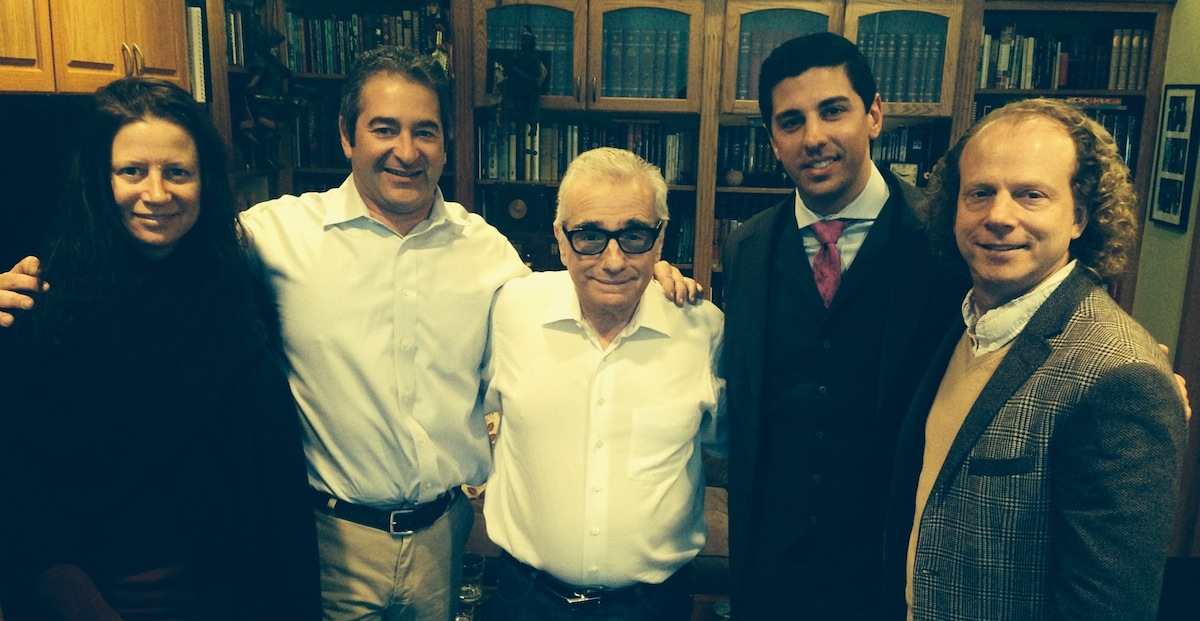
From the left: Bleed for This producer Emma Tillinger Koskoff, producer/Verdi Productions president Chad A. Verdi, executive producer Martin Scorsese, executive producer Sason, producer Bruce Cohen

Title	Role	Status	Year
Bleed for This	Executive producer	Completed	2015
Almost Mercy	Executive producer	Post-production	2015
Opposite Sex	Executive producer	Completed	2014
The 50 Year Argument	Executive producer	Completed	2014
