= Kerion (band) =

- Origin: Nice, France
- Genres: Symphonic metal Power metal
- Years active: 2003 - present
- Website: www.kerion.net

Kerion is a symphonic metal band from France.

== Biography ==
Kerion features a lyrical choir, as well as metal choirs by Phil Gordana (Fairyland) and a lyrical singer as their guest vocalist. The cover art of their albums is done by artist JP Fournier (Avantasia, Edguy) and their work is mixed in Harkam Studio by Wildric Lievin (Hamka, Fairyland) and Guillaume Serra.

Kerion began as an instrumental prog metal band in 1997 under the name of "Kirlian". However, a female singer named Flora then joined the lineup and the band's sound evolved into one which leaned more towards symphonic metal. They released two demos conceptually based on the heroic fantasy tale "Staraxis" written by Chris Barberi: the "Conspiracy of Darkness" and "The Last Sunset".

2008's "Holy Creatures Quest" was the third and final part of Barberi's novel.

As newer fans asked to hear old demos, the band decided to rewrite some of the songs and make a quality studio recording, as they were not happy with the quality of the demos. These would be released as "The Origins".

== Line-up ==
- Rémi - Guitars
- Sylvain - Guitars
- Flora - Vocals
- Antony - Bass
- JB - Drums

== Past members ==
- Sam - Drums
- Stéphane - Bass

== Discography ==
=== Studio albums ===
- 2008: Holy Creatures Quest
- 2010: The Origins
- 2012: CloudRiders Part I: Road to Skycity
- 2015: CloudRiders Part 2: Technowars
- 2022: CloudRiders: Age Of Cyborgs

=== Demos ===
- 2003: Conspiracy of Darkness
- 2005: The Last Sunset
