= Sellaband =

Defunct music website

- Website type: Crowdfunding / Music
- Available in: English, German, Japanese
- Owner: Sellaband GmbH
- Creators: Johan Vosmeijer, Dagmar Heijmans
- Registration: Required for buying parts, not required for listening
- Launched: August 2006 / Bankrupt Feb 2010 / Relaunched Feb 2010

Sellaband was a music website that allowed artists to raise the money from their fans and the SellaBand community in order to record a professional album. Sellaband used the mechanisms of crowdfunding and was to be seen as a Direct-to-Fan/fan-funded music platform utilising a Threshold Pledge System / Provision Point Mechanism. It was set up by Johan Vosmeijer (ex Sony/BMG), Pim Betist (ex Shell), and Dagmar Heijmans (ex Sony/BMG) in August 2006. Its offices used to be located in Amsterdam, Netherlands, but it was originally incorporated in Bocholt, Germany.

On April 8, 2008, Sellaband raised EU€3.5 million (US$5 million) in their Series A round led by Prime Technology Ventures.

In early 2009, Pim Betist left Sellaband to set up Africa Unsigned, using Sellaband technology as a base and supported by the Dutch government.

In January 2010, Sellaband filed for bankruptcy. It relaunched days later, after an investor stepped forward. The office was relocated to Munich, Germany. On August 28, 2015, the Sellaband GmbH filed for bankruptcy, too. This was rejected because of lack of mass by the District Court Charlottenburg on January 12, 2016.

For three years, Sellaband supported the sharing of revenue, a form of equity crowdfunding. Research from the Journal of Economics & Management Strategy examined investment data on the Sellaband platform during this time period. The data shows that, while investments can come from funders around the world, distance continues to affect the flow of funding and information.

== Events ==
Sellaband conducted three official concerts in Europe.

- "New Years Party" (January 2007), the Paradiso, Amsterdam, NL
- "London Calling" (June 2007), Gibson Studios, London, UK
- "Sellabration - Birthday Party" (August 15, 2007 & 2008), the Paradiso, Amsterdam, NL

== Artists who reached their goal ==
86 artists reached their fundraising goal. In December 2009 Cubworld was the first artist, closing his second budget. Less than two weeks after bankruptcy, Aryn Michelle was the first artist, closing her budget under the new SellaBand-management. In October 2010 Epyllion closed the first budget on Sellaband that was not used for recording new but for promoting of already released music.

Upon closure of the site, there were over 700 artists registered on Sellaband raising funds.

The following table shows the most notable artists that reached their funding goal on SellaBand:

| # | Artist | Budget | Project aim | Closing date | Country | Notes |
|---|---|---|---|---|---|---|
| 1 | Nemesea | $50.000 | Album | 2006-11-02 | Netherlands | first artist ever to complete a funding on SellaBand |
| 2 | Cubworld | $50.000 | Album | 2007-12-01 | United States | first artist ever to complete two fundings on SellaBand |
| 3 | Julia Marcell | $50.000 | Album | 2007-10-05 | Poland | first eastern European artist to complete a funding on SellaBand |
| 4 | BulletProof Messenger | $50.000 | Album | 2007-21-12 | United States | artist with most believers on SellaBand |
| 5 | Electric Eel Shock | $50.000 | Album | 2008-25-06 | Japan | first Japanese artist to reach a funding goal on SellaBand |
| 6 | Hind | €40.000 | Album | 2009-12-06 | Netherlands | collected €40.000 within 11 days and charted on #8 in the Dutch charts |
| 7 | Epyllion | €1500 | Promotion | 2010-10-20 | Canada | first artist raising funds for promotion of an already released record |
| 8 | Public Enemy | €59.100 | Album | 2010-11-28 | United States | first established artist raising funds on SellaBand |
| 9 | Jonathan Davis | €25.000 | DVD | 2011-04-14 | United States | lead singer of KORN and first artist raising funds for a DVD |
| 10 | John Coffey | €4.000 | Album | 2011-10-23 | Netherlands | first hardcore punk band that completed a funding on SellaBand |
| 11 | Lana Wolf | €3.000 | Album | 2014-07-05 | Netherlands | artist that will record a country album in Nashville |

== See also ==
- Comparison of crowd funding services
- Crowdsourcing
- Music 2.0
- Netlabel
- Social commerce
- Web 2.0
