= The Gates of Oblivion =

Studio album by Dark Moor
- Released: 11 March 2002
- Recorded: September–October 2001
- Genre: Power metal, symphonic metal, neoclassical metal
- Length: 56:38
- Label: Arise Records

Dark Moor chronology
The Hall of the Olden Dreams (2000)	The Gates of Oblivion (2002)	Dark Moor (2003)

Professional ratings
Review scores
Source	Rating
Allmusic	4.5/5 stars
Rock Hard	7.5/10 stars
Metal.de	8/10 stars
Powermetal.de	
Vampster	

The Gates of Oblivion is the third full-length album of the Spanish power metal band Dark Moor, released March 31, 2002 on Arise Records. It's also the last album with singer Elisa C. Martín.

This album had the collaboration of the Valcavasian Choir and the singer Dan Keying of Cydonia. It was produced by Luigi Stefanini.

== Track listing ==
No.	Title	Length
1.	"In the Heart of Stone"	4:40
2.	"A New World"	5:56
3.	"The Gates of Oblivion"	1:42
4.	"Nevermore"	4:48
5.	"Starsmaker (Elbereth)"	5:47
6.	"Mist in the Twilight"	0:53
7.	"By the Strange Path of Destiny"	5:51
8.	"The Night of the Age"	4:40
9.	"Your Symphony"	4:34
10.	"The Citadel of the Light"	1:15
11.	"A Truth for Me"	5:08
12.	"Dies Irae (Amadeus)"	11:17

Japanese/Russian edition bonus track
No.	Title	Length
13.	"The Shadow of the Nile"	6:02

Japanese edition bonus track
No.	Title	Length
14.	"Mystery of Goddess"	05:30

2012 reissued edition bonus tracks
No.	Title	Length
13.	"Flying (demo)"	06:38
14.	"Halloween (Helloween cover)"	13:23

== Band ==
- Elisa Martin - lead & backing vocals, soprano voice on #12
- Enrik Garcia - guitars & backing vocals
- Albert Maroto - guitars & backing vocals
- Anan Kaddouri - bass
- Jorge Sáez - drums
- Roberto Peña de Camús - keyboards

== Guest musicians ==
- Valcavasia's choir - choir on #01, 02, 04, 08 & 12
- Dan Keying - guest vocals on #04, 05, 07, 08 & 11

== Production ==
- Luigi Stefanini - producer
- Andreas Marschall - artwork
