= MT9 =

Digital audio format

- Filename extension: .mt9
- Type of format: digital audio

MT9 is a digital audio file format developed by Korea's Electronics and Telecommunications Research Institute (ETRI). The format is currently being promoted by Audizen under the commercial name of Music 2.0.

MT9 allows listeners to adjust the volume for each channel – such as guitar, drums, bass and vocals – muting or amplifying their favourite parts. This feature would also likely be used by artists, who could more easily create remixes from existing songs, and this could create intellectual property conflicts.

The format was supposedly presented to the Moving Picture Experts Group (MPEG) in its 84th meeting in Archamps, France, in April 2008, and voted as a candidate for a new international standard for digital audio, being scheduled to be further discussed by the MPEG during its 85th meeting in Hanover, Germany, in July 2008. However, the press releases of both meetings make no mention of this.

Samsung and LG both showed interest in equipping their mobile phones with an MT9 player and their first commercial products are likely to debut early 2009, according to Audizen's CEO Ham Seung-chul.
