= Nemesea =

Dutch alternative rock band

- Singer Manda Ophuis in 2008

Background information
- Origin: Netherlands
- Genres: Alternative metal, alternative rock, gothic rock, electronic rock, symphonic gothic metal (early)
- Years active: 2002–present
- Labels: Ebony Tears, Napalm
- Members: Hendrik Jan de Jong; Sonny Onderwater; Steven Bouma; Lasse Dellbrügge; Manda Ophuis
- Past members: Sanne Mieloo; Lasse Dellbrugge; Frank van der Star; Chris Postma; Sander Zoer; Martijn Pronk; Berto Booijink
- Website: nemesea.com

Nemesea is a Dutch alternative rock band formed in Groningen in 2002 by singer Manda Ophuis and guitarist/songwriter Hendrik Jan 'HJ' de Jong and shortly thereafter completed with Sonny Onderwater on bass. Initially, Nemesea were a symphonic gothic metal act, and were compared to Dutch compatriots After Forever. However, since 2007's In Control, the band's music has become more rock-oriented, also incorporating strong electronic influences.

== History ==
=== Early years ===
Following a three-song demo, Nemesea had their first performance as support act for After Forever in the P60 Amstelveen and remained that band's support for a year. They attracted record company interest and signed for the Dutch independent label Ebony Tears in November 2003.

=== Mana ===
In November 2004, Nemesea released their debut album Mana, touring the Netherlands, Belgium and other European countries extensively until December 2005. By this time, they were well-established in the European gothic/symphonic metal scene.

=== In Control and Pure Live @ P3 ===
For their second album, Nemesea had talks with major record labels, but later decided to sign up to the Dutch crowdsourcing website Sellaband. They were the first band to raise more than $50,000 from fans in a three-month period. The album In Control, mixed by Ronald Prent and co-produced by Tony Platt was released on 21 June 2007. A distribution deal was made with Rough Trade Records to bring the new album to music stores in Benelux on 26 October 2007. The band signed also a booking deal with Dutch agent AT Productions and found a new manager in David Arden, brother of Sharon Osbourne and former manager of James Brown.

In 2009 a live album was released following the band's performances at the P3 in Purmerend. The two live shows were set up in full 9.2 omni surround to give the audience the feeling they were "immersed in sound". The live album Pure Live@P3 was released on 7 September 2009. The album was later on remixed and re-released as part of a special 5.1 surround album bundled with the 5.1 surround version of In Control with Ronald Prent again in charge of the 5.1 surround mix.

=== The Quiet Resistance ===
In 2010 Nemesea signed with the Austrian music label Napalm Records and preparations for their new album began, resulting in Nemesea's third studio album The Quiet Resistance, released November 2011.

In July 2010, the band announced they were recording their third studio album, which they hoped would be early late 2011. On a tight budget, recording at their home studio, new elements were added to the Nemesea sound developed on both previous albums. This resulted in more synth heavy, somewhat darker, bigger sound with melodic arrangements. The new song "Caught in the Middle" was posted on YouTube, and was added to the track list of The Quiet Resistance.

The album's 14 songs contain three duets, one with Charlotte Wessels (Delain), one with BulletProof Messenger members Marcus Klavan (vocals) and Matt Litwin (DJ) and another one with vocalist Heli Reißenweber from Maerzfeld. For drums Nemesea attracted Frank van der Star and for keyboards/DJ Lasse Dellbrügge. The band reached out to producer and mix engineer Joost van den Broek for production and mix. The album was met with positive reviews and The Quiet Resistance helped grow Nemesea's fan base. "Afterlife" was released as a single and video and after the release Nemesea toured extensively in Holland and Germany.

=== Uprise ===
On 9 August 2012, guitarist Hendrik Jan de Jong posted a photo on his Facebook timeline stating that the band had officially started working on their yet to be named fourth studio album. On 2 April 2015 the band began with early pre-production that resulted in three new songs in Key Studio's and Mastersound studios. The band posted the front cover of the album on their Facebook page on 28 January 2016, the stating that it would be called Uprise and the release date would be 29 April 2016. This was also announced by Blabbermouth.net.

Uprise was recorded at the Giesound-studios in Zwolle. Producer Guido Aalbers (Muse, Coldplay, No Doubt) played a crucial role. Nemesea pushed for a more natural, organic, pure sound while avoiding over-production and adding electronics as a flavour this time. Former Nemesea drummer Steven Bouma joined Nemesea again in the studio. From the album 'Twilight' was released as a lyric video and 'Forever' released as a single and video on YouTube. According to the press Uprise is the testimony of Nemesea reminiscing after an emotional chapter of hanging on to the past whilst dealing with a new reality and allowing oneself (as well as others) to make the next step. With Uprise Nemesea has evolved from a metal band to a rock band with songs to match.

=== New singer ===
On 1 August 2016, Manda reported on Facebook that she is "giving up [her] dream of being a singer" and therefore has left the band. Later the same day the band reported on their homepage that Manda was going to focus on "her education job with highly gifted children". Nemesea also stated that they will continue as a band and that their previous drummer Steven Bouma had rejoined the band.

In September 2016 Nemesea played on a festival in De Oosterpoort in Groningen, Netherlands. The festival was hosted by De Oosterpoort together with the record store Plato. The performance featured 5 different vocalists as Nemesea played various songs from the album Uprise. On 10 October 2016 Nemesea started the search for a new singer.

On 19 May 2017 Nemesea released their first single with new singer Sanne Mieloo called "Dance In The Fire". A music video was released on YouTube by Napalm Records on 1 June 2017.

Mieloo also occasionally played the role of Kala in the Dutch musical version of Tarzan and even appeared on the 2018 re-release of Andreas Nergård's The Haunted, taken from the 2018 re-release of his album Memorial for a Wish.

=== Since 2017 ===
In November 2017, a new version of "Hear Me", and in March 2018, a new version of "Twilight", both taken from the album Uprise, were released. Both songs were remixed and remastered and feature Sanne Mieloo on vocals. Additionally new samples and keyboard parts were added by Matthijs van Til.

On 24 June, the single Kids With Guns, taken from the upcoming album White Flag, was released. Napalm Records released a teaser before uploading the complete song to YouTube. On 22 July the second single – Fools Gold – was released. The 3rd and final single -White Flag- was released on 19 August.

On 23 August, the full album -White Flag- was released. It contains 14 songs including -Dance in the Fire-, a single that was released in 2017. Recording (drums, percussion and bass guitar) partly took place in an empty house with the drums set up in the kitchen. Vocals, keys and guitar were partly recorded at different locations. Mixing was done by Joost van den Broek who also mixed -The Quiet Resistance. Mastering was done by Darius van Helfteren.

On 22 March 2020, a video was posted to Nemesea's Facebook page by Nemesea and Sanne Mieloo announcing she was parting ways with the band.

On 8 July 2022, a new single "No Good - Start the Dance" was released. It is a cover of electronic band The Prodigy's 1994 single "No Good (Start the Dance)".

Until 28 March 2024, there has been no further news regarding a potential new female singer or new original music, but the band has commented a few times against the idea of remaining with only male vocals.

On 29 March 2024, the band released a new single, called "Save Me", with guest vocals by Charlotte Wessels, and lead vocals by Sanne Mieloo, marking it her return to the band.

On 21 December 2024, the band released a new single called "Black Dress", and has Manda Ophuis on vocals.

== Band members ==
Current

- Hendrik Jan de Jong – guitars, keyboards, vocals (2002–present)
- Sonny Onderwater – bass, keyboards (2002–present)
- Steven Bouma – drums (2006–2011, 2016–present)
- Lasse Dellbrügge – keyboards (2007–2015, 2019–present)
- Manda Ophuis – vocals (2002–2016, 2024-present)

Former

- Sanne Mieloo – vocals (2017–2020, 2024)
- Frank van der Star – drums (2011–2015)
- Chris Postma – drums (2002–2005)
- Sander Zoer – drums (2005–2006)
- Martijn Pronk – guitars (2002–2007)
- Berto Booijink – keyboards (2002–2007)

== Discography ==
=== Studio albums ===
- Mana (2004)
- In Control (2007)
- The Quiet Resistance (2011)
- Uprise (2016)
- White Flag (2019)

=== Live albums ===
- Pure: Live @ P3 (2009)

=== Singles ===
- No More (2009)
- Twilight (2016)
- Forever (2016)
- Dance in the Fire (2017)
- Hear Me (Alternate Version 2017) (2017)
- Twilight (New Vocal Version 2018) (2018)
- Kids with Guns (2019)
- Fools Gold (2019)
- White Flag (2019)
- New Year's Day (2020)
- Wake Up! (2020)
- Threefold Law 2021 (2021)
- No Good - Start the Dance (2022)
- Save Me (featuring Charlotte Wessels) (2024)
- Black Dress (2024)
