= The Hall of the Olden Dreams =

Studio album by Dark Moor
- Released: 1 December 2000
- Recorded: August–November 2000
- Genre: Symphonic metal, power metal
- Length: 48:48
- Label: Arise Records

Dark Moor chronology
| Shadowland (1999) | The Hall of the Olden Dreams (2000) | The Gates of Oblivion (2002) |

Professional ratings
Review scores
| Source | Rating |
|---|---|
| Rock Hard | 6/10 stars |
| Metal.de | 5/10 stars |
| Powermetal.de | |
| Vampster | |

The Hall of the Olden Dreams is the second full-length album released by Spanish power metal band Dark Moor.

Many of the songs are based on historic figures or events, such as "Maid of Orleans", "Bells of Notre Dame", and "Quest for the Eternal Fame".

== Track listing ==
1. "The Ceremony" - 1:29
2. "Somewhere in Dreams" - 4:49
3. "Maid of Orleans" - 5:02
4. "Bells of Notredame" - 4:40
5. "Silver Lake" - 5:15
6. "Mortal Sin" - 5:34
7. "The Sound of the Blade" - 3:57
8. "Beyond the Fire" - 6:09
9. "Quest for the Eternal Fame" - 6:47
10. "Hand in Hand" - 4:33
11. "The Fall of Melniboné" [Bonus track] - 10:30
12. "Wood's Song" [Korean Bonus Track] - 03:11
