= Dark Moor =

Spanish metal band

- Origin: Madrid, Spain
- Genres: Power metal; neo-classical metal; symphonic metal
- Years active: 1993−present
- Labels: Arise; Scarlet; Maldito Records (current)
- Members: Enrik Garcia; Dani Fernandez; Carlos Delgado
- Past members: Javier Rubio; Roberto Peña; Elisa C. Martin; Albert Maroto; Anan Kaddouri; Jorge Sáez; Jose Garrido; Andy C. Ricardo Moreno; Mario Garcia; Roberto Cappa; Alfred Romero
- Website: dark-moor.com

Dark Moor is a Spanish symphonic power metal band from Madrid. Formed in 1993, they produced three full-length albums before undergoing a line-up change in which three members left the band to form their own project, Dreamaker. Afterwards, the band continued under the same name, recruiting suitable replacements in time for their eponymous 2003 album. Since 2002, guitarist Enrik Garcia has been the band's sole remaining founding member.

== Background ==
Dark Moor was formed in 1993 in Madrid, Spain, and recorded and released their debut album, Shadowland, in 1999. Dark Moor began the recording sessions for their second album, The Hall of the Olden Dreams, in Italy in August 2000. Their EP The Fall of Melnibone was released in June 2001. Later that year the band began the recording of their third album, The Gates of Oblivion, which was released in 2002. Dark Moor signed with the major label JVC for the Asian release. The band played 18 gigs at festivals such as Rock Machina, Viña Rock and Nit De Reis. After the first part of the tour, keyboardist Roberto Peña left the band and they were forced to finish the tour with a guest musician.

In August 2002, Dark Moor recorded four new exclusive acoustic tracks along with a string quartet, to be included in the EP Between Light and Darkness, which was released in April 2003. Due to differing points of view regarding the musical direction for the next Dark Moor album, vocalist Elisa Martin, guitarist Albert Maroto and drummer Jorge Sáez decided to leave Dark Moor to start a new band, Dreamaker. That band made two albums before splitting up; Human Device (2004) and Enclosed (2005).

The two remaining Dark Moor members searched recruited vocalist Alfred Romero, guitarist Jose Garrido, and drummer Andy C. In August 2003, the band started recording their fourth album, Dark Moor. This was followed by Beyond the Sea (2005) and Tarot (2007).

In November 2006, the band announced the departure of their drummer on their official website, due to "incompatibility with his other musical projects." He would go on to play drums for Saratoga. His replacement, Roberto Cappa, was previously in the Spanish metal band Anima Sola.

In January 2009, their seventh album Autumnal was released. The band made an announcement on their website on 4 June 2010, that their eighth album was in the works. It featured Berenice Musa as a guest vocalist. The album is titled Ancestral Romance and it was released in November 2010. On 18 June 2013 the band released their ninth album Ars Musica. They toured Mexico and Asia the same year, as well as few dates in Europe in 2014 to support the new album.

Dark Moor started recording their 10th studio album, Project X, on 27 July 2015 and released it in Europe on 6 November 2015 on Scarlet Records.

On 21 July 2018, Enrik Garcia, guitarist and founder of the band, announced via Facebook that their next album would be called Origins and that, after the parenthesis they did with ufology themes on Project X, they would return to their habitual themes; Origins will be about the Celtic world, also adding Celtic instruments on their new songs. This album was released on 12 December 2018.

On 25 May 2026, it was announced that the vocalist Alfred Romero left the band.

== Members ==
Current members

- Enrik Garcia (1993–present) - guitar
- Dani Fernandez (2004–2008, 2015–present) - bass
- Carlos Delgado (2021–present) - drums

Former members

- Javier Rubio (1993-1998) - guitar
- Iván Urbistondo (1996-1999) - vocals
- Roberto Peña (1994–2002) - keyboards
- Elisa C. Martin (1999–2003) - vocals
- Albert Maroto (1999–2003) - guitar
- Anan Kaddouri (1998–2004) - bass
- Jorge Sáez - (1998–2003) drums
- Jose Garrido (2003–2004) - guitar
- Jamie Mylles (2004-2006) - guitar
- Andy C. (2003–2006) - drums, keyboards
- Mario Garcia (2008–2015) - bass
- Ricardo Moreno (2015) - bass
- Roberto Cappa (2006–2021) - drums
- Alfred Romero (2003–2026) - vocals

== Discography ==
=== Studio albums ===
- Shadowland (1999)
- The Hall of the Olden Dreams (2000)
- The Gates of Oblivion (2002)
- Dark Moor (2003)
- Beyond the Sea (2005)
- Tarot (2007)
- Autumnal (2009)
- Ancestral Romance (2010)
- Ars Musica (2013)
- Project X (2015)
- Origins (2018)

=== Demos and EPs ===
- Dreams of Madness (1998)
- Flying (1999)
- The Fall of Melnibone (2001)
- Between Light and Darkness (2003)

=== Singles ===
- "From Hell" (2003)
- "The Road Again" (2013)
- "Birth of the Sun" (2018)
- "Vivaldi Summer Storm" (2022)
- "Héroe del Mar" (2023)
- "Wallada la Omeya" (2023)
- "Mío Cid 2023" (2023)
- "V de Vendetta" (2024)
- "Viviendo en un mal sueño" (2025)
