= Manda Ophuis =

Dutch singer (born 1980)

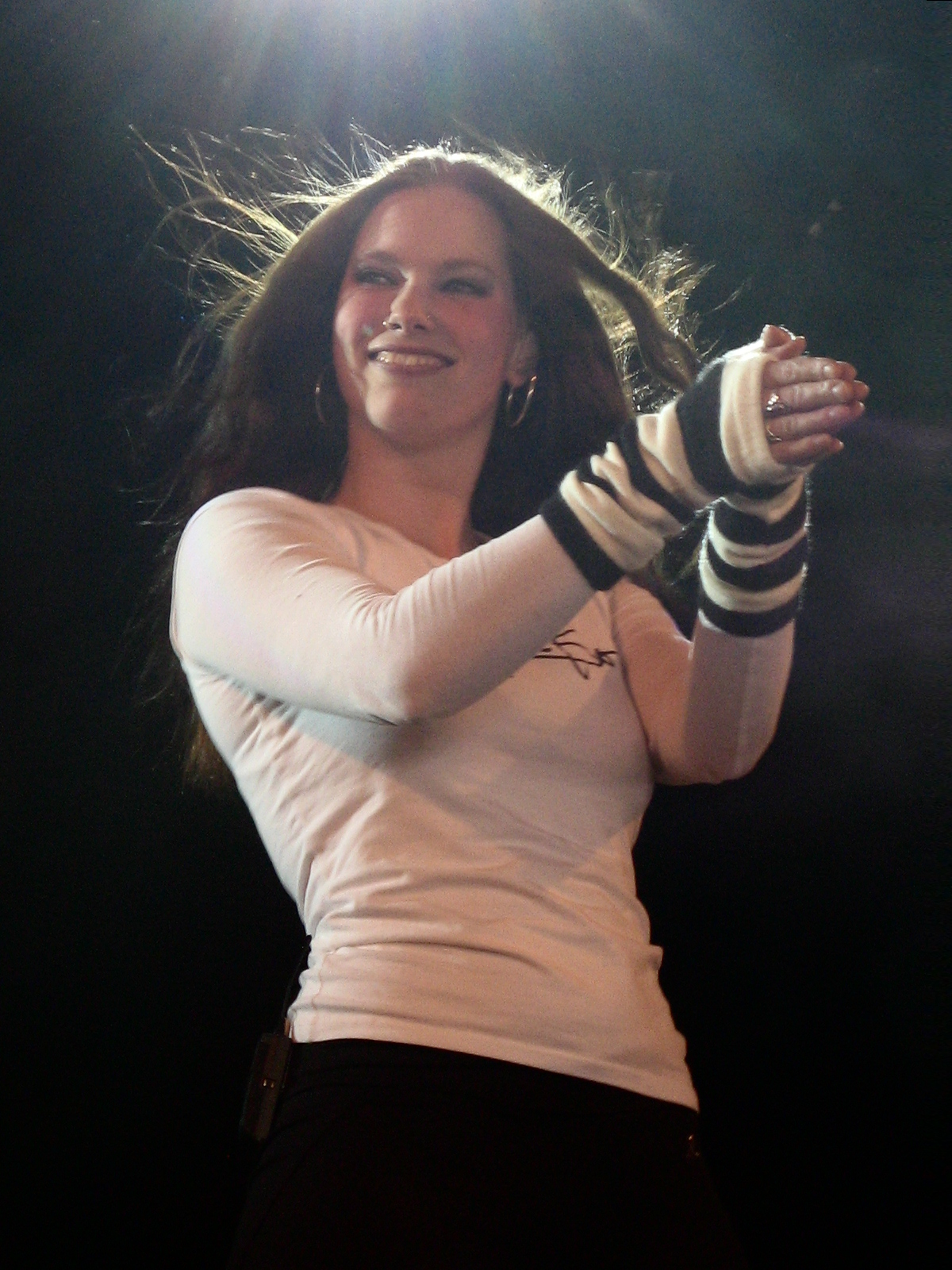

Background information
- Born: 27 November 1980 (age 45)
- Origin: Netherlands
- Genres: Symphonic metal, alternative rock
- Occupation: Singer
- Years active: 2002–2016, 2024-present
- Member of: Nemesea
- Website: nemesea.com

Manda Ophuis (born 27 November 1980) is a Dutch singer and the lead vocalist in the symphonic rock band Nemesea. She has been involved in music since a young age.

== Biography ==
In 1998, Ophuis started taking singing lessons. Her teacher was a student at the conservatory in Groningen, where she herself was admitted a year later. There she began taking vocal lessons with Floor van Zutphen who remained her vocal teacher during her time at the conservatory (2000–2004).

In 2003, Ophuis started taking classical singing lessons as well, also with a student from the conservatory. She took those lessons for two years. She graduated in 2004. In 2005, Ophuis found a new vocal teacher in Kees Taal. Taal taught her about breathing, resonance and how to use the whole body as an instrument.

In 2011, Ophuis decided that she wanted to broaden her range and started taking singing lessons with Setske Mostaert as well.

In August 2016, Ophuis quit the band after 14 years. She has continued in music, working with children.

In 2024, she rejoined Nemesea to provide vocals on the single "Black Dress".

== Influences ==
Ophuis's main inspirations are Anneke van Giersbergen, Tori Amos, Christina Aguilera, and Kelly Clarkson.
