= List of bands from Spain =

This is a list of music bands originating from Spain. For individual musicians, see List of Spanish musicians. See also Music of Spain.

== A ==
- Aerolíneas Federales
- Alaska y los Pegamoides
- Alaska y Dinarama
- Al-Firdaus Ensemble
- Amaral
- Amarok
- Amistades Peligrosas
- Amparanoia
- Andy & Lucas
- Ángeles del Infierno
- Antònia Font
- Avalanch
- Aventuras de Kirlian
- Aviador Dro
- Avulsed
- Azúcar Moreno

== B ==
- Baccara
- Barón Rojo
- Bajoqueta rock
- Barrabás
- Barricada
- Bellepop
- Betagarri
- Boikot
- Bravo
- Bravo Johnson
- Los Bravos
- Los Brincos
- La Buena Vida

== C ==
- Cadillac
- Café Quijano
- Camela
- Los Canarios
- El Canto Del Loco
- La Casa Azul
- Celtas Cortos
- Centinela
- Chambao
- Los Chichos
- El Chojin
- Chucho
- Los Chunguitos
- Cómplices
- Contradanza

== D ==
- Danza Invisible
- Dareysteel
- Dark Moor
- DarkSun
- La Década Prodigiosa
- Décima Víctima
- Def Con Dos
- Delorean
- Los del Mar
- Los del Río
- Los Diablos
- Dixebra
- D'Nash
- Dover
- Duncan Dhu
- Dúo Dinámico
- Duo kie
- Dvicio

== E ==
- EASO Choir
- Elefantes
- Ella Baila Sola
- Eskorbuto
- Esplendor Geométrico
- Estopa
- La Excepción
- Extremoduro
- El Último de la Fila

== F ==
- Facto delafé y las flores azules
- Family
- Fangoria
- Fito y los Fitipaldis
- Forever Slave
- Fórmula V

== G ==
- Gossos
- Los Gandules
- Golpes Bajos
- Las Grecas
- La Guardia

== H ==
- Haemorrhage
- Hamlet
- Héroes del Silencio
- Hidrogenesse
- Hinds
- Hombres G

== I ==
- Itoiz

== J ==
- Jarabe de Palo

== K ==
- K-Narias
- Kaxta
- Ketama
- The Killer Barbies
- Kortatu

== L ==
- Lax'n'Busto
- Le Mans
- Leño
- Los Enemigos
- Los Limones
- Los Suaves
- Lole y Manuel
- Lunae

== M ==
- Macaco
- Machetazo
- Mägo de Oz
- La Mala Rodríguez
- Marea
- Marlango
- M-Clan
- Mecano
- Mezquita
- Milladoiro
- Mocedades
- Mojinos Escozíos
- La Musgaña
- Los Mustang

== N ==
- Nacha Pop
- Nahemah
- Negu Gorriak
- Nena Daconte
- Los Nikis
- Nosoträsh

== Ñ ==
- Ñu

== O ==
- OBK
- Obrint Pas
- Obús
- Ojos de Brujo
- La Oreja De Van Gogh
- Orquesta Mondragón

== P ==
- La Pandilla
- Parálisis Permanente
- Parchís
- Pastora
- Pata Negra
- Los Payasos de la Tele
- Los Pekenikes
- Pereza
- Els Pets
- Pic-Nic
- Pignoise
- Un Pingüino en mi Ascensor
- The Pinker Tones
- Los Planetas
- Platero y Tú
- La Polla Records
- Los Pop Tops
- Presuntos Implicados
- Proyecto Eskhata
- Los Punsetes

== Q ==
- La Quinta Estación

== R ==
- Radio Futura
- Reincidentes
- Os Resentidos
- Los Rodríguez
- Russian Red

== S ==
- Sangtraït
- Sangre Azul
- Santa Justa Klan
- Saratoga
- Sau
- Sauze
- Savia
- Sergio y Estíbaliz
- Sex Museum
- Sexy Sadie
- SFDK
- Sidonie
- Siempre Así
- Siniestro Total
- Los Sírex
- Ska-P
- Skalariak
- Skizoo
- Smash
- Sôber
- Sonblue
- Sopa de Cabra
- Soziedad Alkoholika
- Stravaganzza
- Los Suaves
- El Sueño de Morfeo
- Las Supremas de Móstoles

== T ==
- Tahúres zurdos
- Tako
- Tequila
- Tess
- Tierra Santa
- Los Toreros Muertos
- Tote King
- Triana
- Txarango

== U ==
- El Último de la Fila
- The Unfinished Sympathy

== V ==
- Van Tard
- Vulpes
- Violadores del verso

== W ==
- WarCry

== Z ==
- Zero db
- ZPU
