= Shinova =

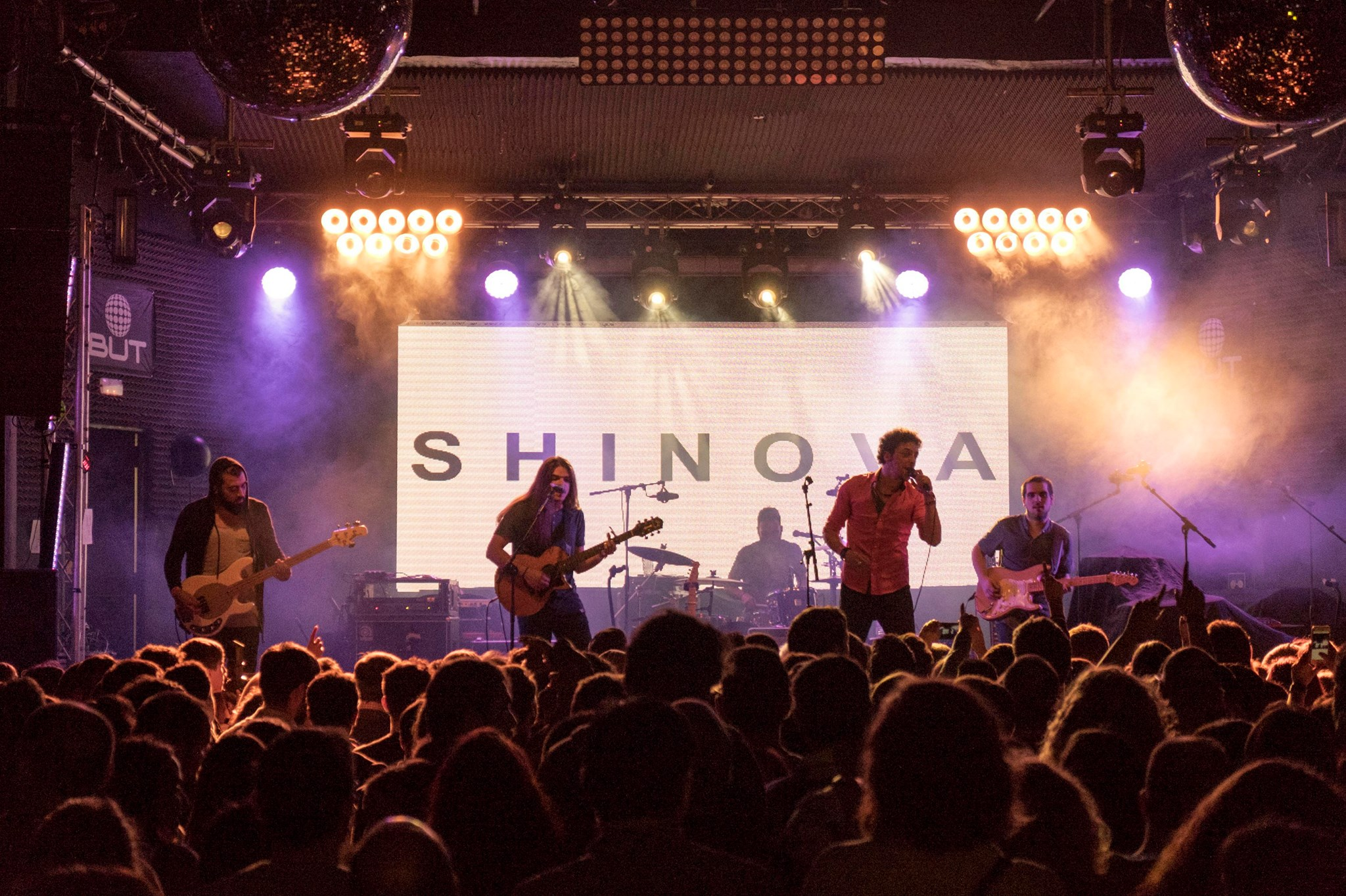
- Shinova in Madrid (2017).

Background information
- Origin: Berriz (Vizcaya), Spain
- Genres: Early: Hard rock; alternative metal; Current: Indie rock; alternative rock; symphonic rock; pop rock
- Years active: 2008–present
- Labels: Maldito Records; Warner Music Spain
- Members: Gabriel de la Rosa; Daniel del Valle; Erlantz Prieto; Ander Cabello; Joshua Froufe
- Past members: Eneko Urcelay; Iñaki Elorza; Javier Martín; Xabier Laria; Argi; Christian Rodriguez; David Gorospe
- Website: shinovarock.es

Shinova is a Spanish alternative rock group, formed in 2008 in Berriz, Vizcaya (Spain). The band's music were initially close to hard rock and alternative metal, they were often compared to Spanish compatriots Sôber, Savia and Skizoo. However, since 2014's Ana y el Artista Temerario released via Spanish label Maldito Records, the music has become more indie rock-oriented. Their fourth album Volver was released in 2016 via Warner Music and peaked at no. 49 in Spanish Albums Charts.

== Current members ==
- Gabriel de la Rosa – vocals
- Daniel del Valle – guitars
- Erlantz Prieto – guitars
- Ander Cabello – bass
- Joshua Froufe – drums

=== Past members ===
- Eneko Urcelay – drums (2008–2014)
- Iñaki Elorza – guitars (2008–2010)
- Javier Martín – guitars (2008–2011)
- Xabier Laria – guitars (2011–2014)
- Argi – guitars (2012–2013)
- Christian Rodriguez – keyboards (2011–2014)
- David Gorospe – studio drummer in the recording of Ana y el Artista Temerario.

== Discography ==
- Latidos (DFX) – 2009
- La Ceremonia de la Confusión (Independent) – 2011
- Ana y el Artista Temerario (Maldito Records) – 2014
- Volver (Warner Music Spain) – 2016
- Cartas De Navegación (Warner Music Spain) – 2018
- La Buena Suerte (Warner Music Spain) – 2021
- El Presente (Warner Music Spain) – 2024
