= Jub Khaleh =

Jub Khaleh or Jubkhaleh (Persian: جوب خله), also known as Chuy Qaleh or Jukheleh or Juy Khaleh, may refer to:

- Jub Khaleh-ye Olya
- Jub Khaleh-ye Sofla
