= Chuy (disambiguation) =

Chuy is a city in Uruguay.

Chuy may also refer to:

== Places ==
- Chüy District of Kyrgyzstan
- Chüy Prospekti, a major avenue in Bishkek, Kyrgyzstan
- Chūy Qal‘eh, Iran
- Chüy Region of Kyrgyzstan
- Chüy, the Kyrgyz name for the river Chu in Kyrgyzstan and Kazakhstan
- Chuy Stream, in Brazil and Uruguay
- Chüy Valley, valley located in north Tian-Shan
- Chüy, Kemin, village in the Kemin District, Chüy Region, Kyrgyzstan
- Chüy, Kyrgyzstan, town in the Chüy District, Chüy Region, Kyrgyzstan
- Posta del Chuy, historic landmark in Cerro Largo Department, Uruguay
- Barra del Chuy

== People ==
=== People with the given name Chuy ===
- Chuy Bravo (1956–2019), Mexican-American actor and entertainer
- Chuy Campusano (1944–1997), also known as Jesus Campusano, American visual artist and muralist
- Jesús "Chuy" García (born 1956), American politician
- Chuy Sanchez (born 1990), Mexican professional footballer
- Chuy Andrade (born 1956), a ring name of Espanto Jr.
- Chuy Hinojosa (born 1946), politician

=== People with the surname Chuy ===
- Don Chuy (1941–2014), American football player

== Fictional characters ==
- Chuy Castillos, Cheech Marin's character on The Golden Palace
- Chuy, title character of Ceasar and Chuy animated television series

== Other uses ==
- Chuy tribes, a collective name for a group of Hunnic tribes Chuüe, Chumi, Chumuhun, Chuban, and Shato
- Chuy (TV program), a teen magazine show in ABS-CBN Northern Mindanao
- Chuy's, a Tex-Mex chain restaurant
- An affectionate nickname for those with Jesus in their names

== See also ==
- Chucho
- Chui (disambiguation)
- Chewy (disambiguation)
