= Monica Moss =

Monica Moss may refer to:

- Monica Moss (fashion designer)
- Monica Moss (artist)
