= Nach (rapper) =

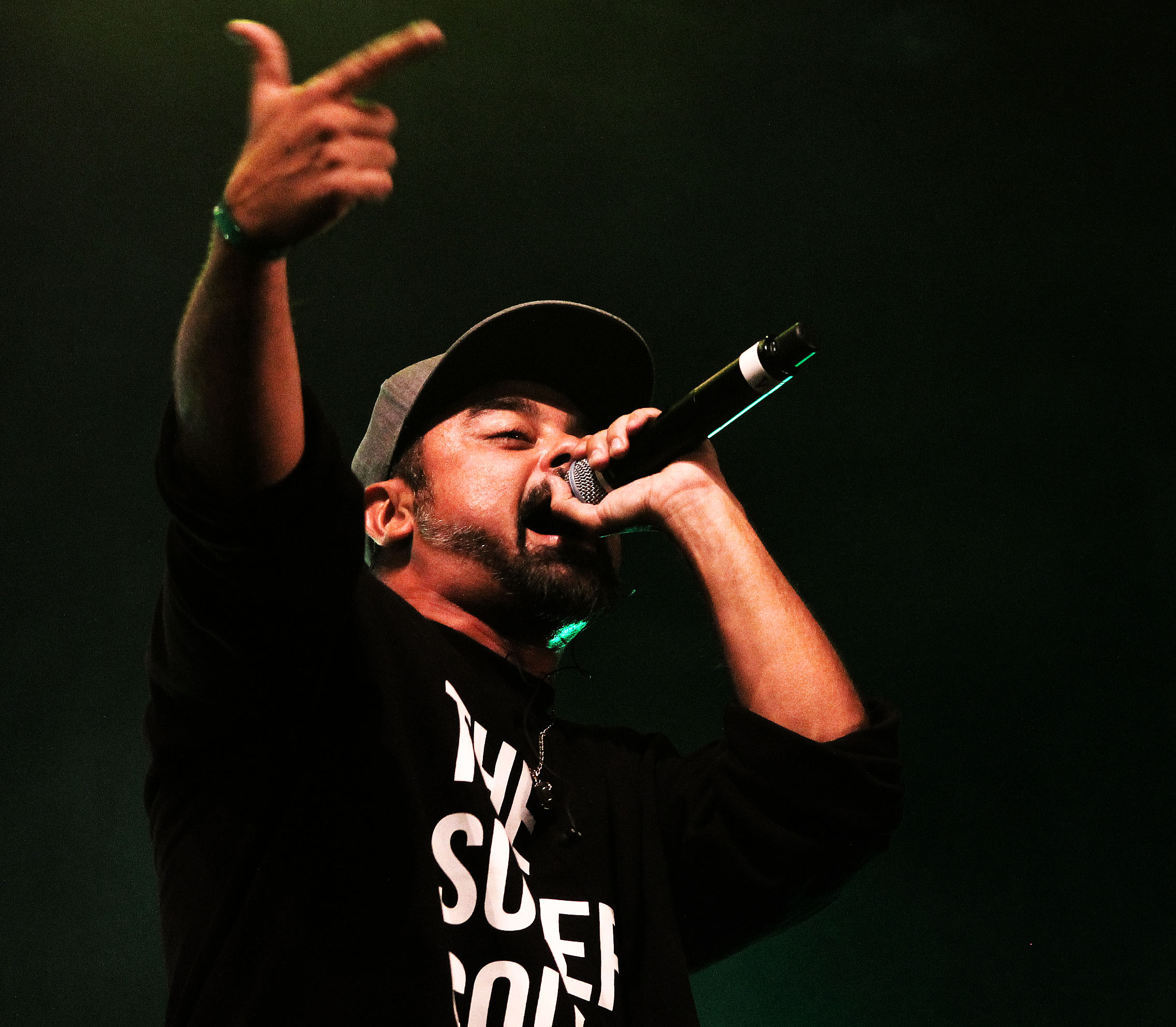
- Nach in 2014

Background information
- Also known as: Nach Scratch; Nach; El rapero poeta; El guerrero de la rima; El cuenta cuentos
- Born: Ignacio José Fornés Olmo; October 1, 1974 (age 52); Albacete, Spain
- Genre: Hip hop
- Occupations: Rapper; songwriter; record producer; actor; entrepreneur
- Instrument: Vocals
- Years active: 1994–present
- Label: Universal
- Website: nach.es

Ignacio José Fornés Olmo (Albacete, Spain, October 1, 1974) is a Spanish rapper, poet, writer, sociologist and actor, initially known as Nach Scratch.

== Early life and education ==
Although a native of Albacete, Nach grew up in Alicante, specifically in the neighborhood of San Blas, there he developed his childhood, he forged his first friends (some perennial as his manager and best friend Francisco Cañas, who Nach referred to in social networks as "my brother from another mother"), he grew up as a rapper, and developed his educational stage, first in the IES Jorge Juan and later at the University of Alicante, where he majored in sociology, he has always been considered an Alicantino, even he considers himself an Alicantino. his songs that allude to this find, for example, "Repaso de mis pasos" (track 3 album "Ars Magna") and "Anochece" (track 16 Album Un Dia En Suburbia).

== Musical career ==
In 1994 Ignacio Fornés Olmo made his first demo, entitled "D.E.P." and in 1997 his second demo was released, called "Trucos".

About this time Nach remembers:

His second album Poesia Difusa is full of manifestos against hypocrisy and social criticism. Features collaborations Arma Blanca, Lirico, Shuga Wuga, Titó and Quiroga, among others. Due to the great acceptance by the public of this disc, a DVD of a concert of Nach in November 2003 was published in Barcelona, with almost all the groups that collaborated on the disc and supported in the concert by Arma Blanca. It was published in two versions, one CD reissuing the Poesia Difusa excluding changes, and another only with the DVD of the concert.

The ACB chose to write and star in the hymn to the Copa del Rey of the 2004–2005 season CBA basketball. The theme is called Juega, which came a maxi.

In early November 2005 he published his third album, Ars Magna – Miradas. It is a complex project by being a double CD, but with different themes in each track. The first, entitled Ars Magna is a continuation of his style in terms of lyrical content. On topics related environmental future, the passage of time or the recording market are discussed. The second, entitled Miradas is a conceptual disc because each song is a different way of seeing life, portrayed by several people including a newborn, a prostitute, an ex-convict, an immigrant, a blind, a homosexual couple, a taxi driver, a parent to be fired and people from different cultures. In this disc the featuring artists are Arma Blanca, Juaninacka, Payo Malo, Aniki and Flavio Rodriguez.

In 2008 he joined the ranks of major label Universal and publishes Un Dia En Suburbia on May 27. Track Efectos Vocales (with the collaboration of the actress dubbing, Montse Bru) and Manifiesto could be heard on their MySpace weeks before the release of the disc. The presentation took place in the Fnac Alicante, one day before departure.

On Un Dia En Suburbia there is a song, Angel, dedicated to his older sister who was born with cerebral palsy and died at 16 years of age.

In the disc Diversidad Nach collaborated with artists from various European countries. Also in 2010 he collaborated with Zénit on the track Utopia and released the track Hoy converso con Miguel to commemorate the 100th anniversary of the birth of poet Miguel Hernandez. Nach reported via the internet in November 16, that he would start recording his next album whose name Mejor que el silencio confirmed with a teaser that rose in their social networks, which suggests several collaborations by famous artists MC's and others' gender, and the release date was on April 12, 2011.

On April 12, 2011, he released the LP Mejor que el silencio, consisting of 17 tracks, with contributions from artists like Rapsusklei, Madnass, Ismael Serrano, El Chojín and ZPU, among others. In 2011 he makes a cameo in the film Chapero-Jackson, Verbo.

On December 5, 2011, released Mejor que el silencio, special edition, consisting of two CDs plus a DVD, this disc includes apart from the 17 tracks of the first version of the album, new songs (El tiempo del miedo, 16, Verbo y Mejor que el silencio, Autorretrato de una trayectoria), and the DVD contains interviews, concerts and videos of Verbo and Balas del silencio, etc.

In 2012 he made his first tour in Latin America, called "Latam Tour", which visited Mexico, Colombia, Venezuela, Chile, Argentina, Ecuador and Peru.

In 2013 he received a gold record for his LP Un Dia en Suburbia.

In July 2013, Nach begins to work on his album called Los Viajes Inmóviles which was officially launched on February 25, 2014. This new album is a change in his musical style, leaving aside the rap and moving to a different style called slam.

In early 2015 he announced that, after releasing the last album in style slam that this same year he would launch a project back to its original style, Rap. The title of the new album is A través de mi and went on sale on March 3, 2015.

== Discography ==
- "DEP" (Demo) (1994)
- "Trucos" (1997)
- "En la brevedad de los días" (LP) (Revelde, 2000)
- "Poesía diffusa" (LP) (Boa Music, 2003)
- "Juega" (Maxi) (Boa Music, 2004)
- "Ars Magna – Miradas" (LP) (Boa Music, 2005)
- "Un día en Suburbia" (LP) (Universal, 2008)
- "Mejor que el silencio" (LP) (Universal, 2011)
- "Los Viajes Inmóviles" (LP) (Universal, 2014)
- "A través de mí" (LP) (Universal, 2015)
- "Cazadores de Instantes" (Mixtape, 2016)
- "Almanauta" (LP) (Universal, 2018)

== Collaborations ==
Year	Song	Other artists	Album
1997	"El primer asalto (La patrulla estilo)"	SFDK	Llámalo como lo quieras
1997	"Otra victoria"	Nerviozzo	El hombre temah
1998	"Micro abierto"	Expresión En Conserva	Expresión En Conserva
1998	"No hay rebaja"	La Gota que Colma	Mordiendo el micro
2000	"Me he acostumbrado"	Magnatiz	A Puerto
2001	"Maestros de ceremonia"	Nona	Nadie Como Yo
2001	"Esperando mi tren"	Maese KDS	Viviendo y aprendiendo
2003	"Hemos creado un monstruo"	El Chojin	Jamás intentes negarlo
2003	"La misión"	Arma Blanca	La misión
2003	"Mis días"	Dlux & Flavio Rodríguez	Después de la marea
2003	"Ni retirada ni rendición"	Jefe de la M	Entra El Dragón
2004	"Shock remix"	Dj Yulian	Shock!
2004	"Endemoniados"	Loren	El proyecto del mono
2004	"R-Evolución y Desde el Otro Lado"	Arma Blanca	R-Evolución
2005	"La esperanza"	Abram	Necrópolis
2005	"Intro"	Arkangeles	Escrito en sangre
2006	"Noches en BCN"	ZPU	El hombre de oro
2006	"El carcelero"	Lesky & Dino BBD	Dr. Cannibal
2006	"Sensaciones"	Tino & Sake	Vendíos
2006	"Alfa remix"	DJ Klean & Dj Joaking	Quid Pro Quo CD 2
2007	"Por amor al arte"	Cres	Reflexiones
2007	"Paraíso privado"	Flavio Rodríguez	Flaviolous
2007	"Error del sistema"	VV.AA.	Alicante Hip Hop Vol. 2 CD 2
2007	"Resistencia"	Unomasuno	Plenitud
2007	"Cada golpe"	DOSHERMANOS	Sangre de mi sangre
2007	"El musicólogo"	Arma Blanca	Autodidactas
2008	"Deslizamiento"	ZPU	Contradicziones
2008	"El franco tirador"	Dogma Crew	La Octava Plaga
2008	"Humo"	Kedir	Metafísica
2009	"Infinite avenue"	La Odysea	Como 5 dedos de una mano
2009	"El Último Día"	Complot	The Show
2010	"Vida Rap Ida"	Desplante & ZPU	Kalashnikov
2010	"¿Por qué?"	Rayden	Estaba Escrito
2010	"Energía"	Syla	Energía
2010	"Números uno"	Abram	Intenso
2010	"Utopia"	Zénit (MC)	Nadir
2011	"The Experience"	Diversidad	Diversidad "The Experience"
2011	"Anthem"	Diversidad	Diversidad "The Experience"
2011	"Go Hard"	Diversidad	Diversidad "The Experience"
2011	"Where i'm From"	Diversidad	Diversidad "The Experience"
2011	"We don't Sleep"	Diversidad	Diversidad "The Experience"
2011	"RAP vs Racismo"	El Chojin	El Ataque de los que Observaban
2011	"Classic"	Dj Zide & Baghira	Diggin in the Crates for Classics
2012	"After Hours: Alicante"	DJ Joaking & DJ SaoT ST	After Hour: "The Mixtape"
2013	"Los PRO"	El Chojin	I.R.A.
2013	"El espejismo"	Ismael Serrano	
2013	"Hombres de luz"	Versoterismo	
2013	"Mi fortaleza"	Rigor Mortis	
2013	"Escalera hacia el cielo"	Heavy Roots	
2013	"Estira Los Dedos"	ZPU	Doce lunas
2014	"No tiene precio"	Shotta	Flowesia
2014	"Classic"	Abram con Rapsuskle & Dlux	Cazadores de sueños
2014	"Tres otoños"	Rayden con Rozalén	En alma y hueso
2015	"Saliendo del círculo"	Baghira	Bloody Halloween
2015	"Andrómeda"	Tron Dosh	Mi horizonte de sucesos
2018	"Rap Bruto"	Residente	

== Unedited tracks ==
- "Perro No Come Perro" version with Tres Coronas (P.N.O and Rocca)
- "Hoy Converso con Miguel" (2010) [Tribute to Spanish poet Miguel Hernández in celebration for centenary of his birth]
- "Basado en Hechos Reales" (2011) [Special edition created for reaching 300.000 followers on Facebook]..
- "No Sale el Sol" (2012).
- "After Hour" Con DJ Joaking & DJ SaoT ST (2012)
- "Verbo"
- "Latam Tour"
