= Tarde (disambiguation) =

Gabriel Tarde (1843–1904) was a French sociologist, criminologist and social psychologist. Tarde may also refer to:

- Pravin Tarde, Indian film director, actor, producer, and scriptwriter
- Jean Tarde (1561/62–1636), Vicar general of Sarlat, known for his chronicles of the diocese

== See also ==
- Tard (disambiguation)
- Tardes, commune in the Creuse department of France
- Tardes (river), in the Creuse department of France
- Tardy, adjective form of Tardiness
- Tardy (surname)
