= Savia =

Savia or SAVIA can refer to:

- Savia (plant), a plant genus
- Pannonia Savia, a Roman province created in the 3rd century AD
- Savia, a 9th century Slavic principality in Lower Pannonia
- Ezio Della Savia (born 1942), Italian swimmer
- Savia (album), an album by the J-pop singer Mami Kawada
- Savia (band), a Spanish rock band
