= Amarok =

Amarok may refer to:

== Music ==
- Amarok (band), a Spanish progressive rock band
- Amarok (Mike Oldfield album), 1990
- Amarok (Nargaroth album), 2000
- Amarok, 2010 album by Francisco López (musician)

== Other uses ==
- Amarok (wolf), in Inuit mythology
- Amarok (software), an open-source audio player named after the Mike Oldfield album
- Volkswagen Amarok, a pickup truck
