= Tard =

Tard may refer to:

- Tard, Hungary, a village in Borsod-Abaúj-Zemplén county
- Jean-Baptiste Tard (fl. 1980s–2000s), a Canadian production designer
- Tard, a shorter form of retard
- Tardiness, habit of being late or delaying arrival
  - Tardiness (scheduling), measure of delay in executing certain operations in scheduling

== See also ==
- Tarde (disambiguation)
- Van Tard, Spanish rock band formed in Barcelona in 2008
