= Chewy =

Chewy may refer to:

- Chewy (company), pet food company based in the United States
- Chewy: Esc from F5, a 1996 computer game and its title character
- Andrew Lichtenberger (born 1987), American poker player
- Daniel Mongrain (born 1976), member of the Canadian band Martyr
- Luis Suárez (Uruguayan footballer), Uruguayan association footballer
- Chewy the puppy, a character from the animation series Foster's Home for Imaginary Friends
- Chewbacca, a fictional character, whose name is often shortened to "Chewy" or "Chewie"
- An Australian abbreviation for chewing gum
- A wine tasting descriptor
- Chewy bar, a brand name granola bar made by the Quaker Oats Company

== See also ==
- "Chewy Chewy", a song by Ohio Express
- Chewiness, used to describe any foodstuff that requires a lot of chewing
- Chuy (disambiguation)
