= Ella baila sola =

Spanish musical duo

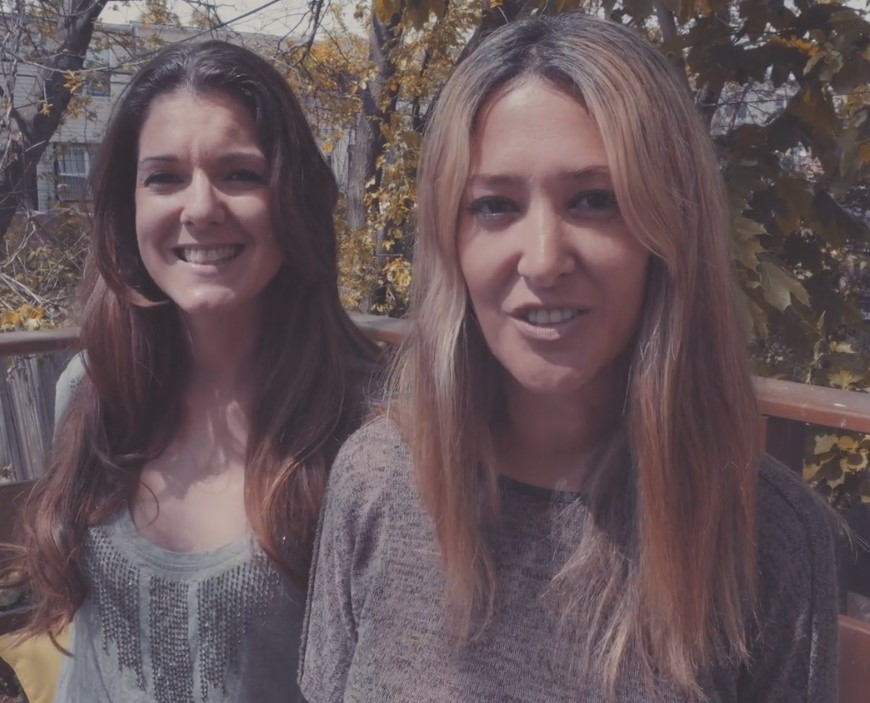
- Ella Baila Sola in 2016

Background information
- Origin: Madrid, Spain
- Genres: Pop
- Years active: 1996–2001; 2009–2013; 2015–present
- Label: EMI-Odeon
- Members: Marta Botía; Virginia Mos
- Past members: Marilia Andrés; Rocío Pavón; María del Mar García

Ella baila sola (English: She dances alone) is a Spanish musical duet formed by Marta Botía Alonso (Madrid, Spain, September 15, 1974) and Marilia Andrés Casares (Cuenca, Spain, December 17, 1974). The group dissolved in 2001. It is active right now with Marta touring Latin America. However, Marilia is not in the band anymore. As of April 2021, Marta & Marilia announced their reunion tour to commemorate the band's 25th anniversary.

== History ==
Marilia Andrés Casares and Marta Botía met while studying at Madrid's San Agustin School. Originally, the duo dubbed "The Just", and sang exclusively in English. However, once producer Gonzalo Benavides listened to a demo by the duo, he convinced them to begin singing in Spanish. Upon switching languages, the group also underwent a transformation of its own. The duo, now titled "Ella Baila Sola" (inspired by the song "They Dance Alone" by Sting) recorded its first self titled album in 1996. Their musical style consisted of a mix of Latin Cantautor, Latin Pop, Spanish Pop and Spanish Pop Rock. Just a year later, the group was awarded the "Best Spanish Band" award at Premios Amigos. The group's debut album was a huge hit in Spain, selling over a million copies. The album also generally sold very well across Latin America. Songs such as "Lo echamos a suertes" and "Amores de barra" quickly became staple hits of the 1990s in Spain. The duo have toured Mexico, Chile, the United States and Spain. In the months before the separation of Ella Baila Sola, the distance between the duo became increasingly evident as they avoided each other completely. Furthermore, after her departure from Ella Baila Sola, Marilia Andrés Casares continued to pursue her individual artistic passions and continued her career as a singer songwriter

== Music ==
Shortly after their first album in 1996, the duo released two more albums which furthered their success and notoriety in the Latin world. However, due to personal differences, in 2001, Marta and Marilia chose to part ways and pursue their own musical careers and lifestyles. After years of inactivity, Marta Botía relaunched the group with new member Rocío Pavón in 2009. With Pavón, Ella Baila Sola released two new albums in 2009 and 2010 dubbed Awake and Grandes Exitos. Awake consisted of new music and a new tour across Spain, whilst Grandes Exitos was a compilation of the duo's greatest hits from the 90's. In 2013 the band was dissolved and Rocío Pavón left the group after a collection of reproaches over Facebook. Soon after Pavón's departure, in 2015, Marta brought in María del Mar García (2015–2018) to accompany her on tours. Later, the group relaunched for a fourth time in 2018 with another new member, Virginia Mos and have recently hinted at new music.

== Discography ==
- Ella baila sola (1996)
- E.B.S. (1998)
- Marta y Marilia (2000)
- Grandes éxitos (2001)

=== Collaborations ===
- Mira que eres canalla Aute (Ella baila sola – Ay de ti, Ay de mí)
- Mujer (Ella baila sola – No sabes como sufrí || Todos – Hay que volver an empezar)
- Homenaje a Jesús de la Rosa (Marilia – Tu frialdad || Todos – Recuerdos de una noche)
- Elefantes (Elefantes & Marilia – Me gustaría hacerte feliz)
- Se vende (Tonxu & Marta Botía – Risk || Tonxu & Ella baila sola – El caprichoso)
- Vampiros en La Habana (Guaraná & Marta Botía – Échame a mí la culpa)
