= Monica Moss (artist) =

- Mónica Ramos Palomo
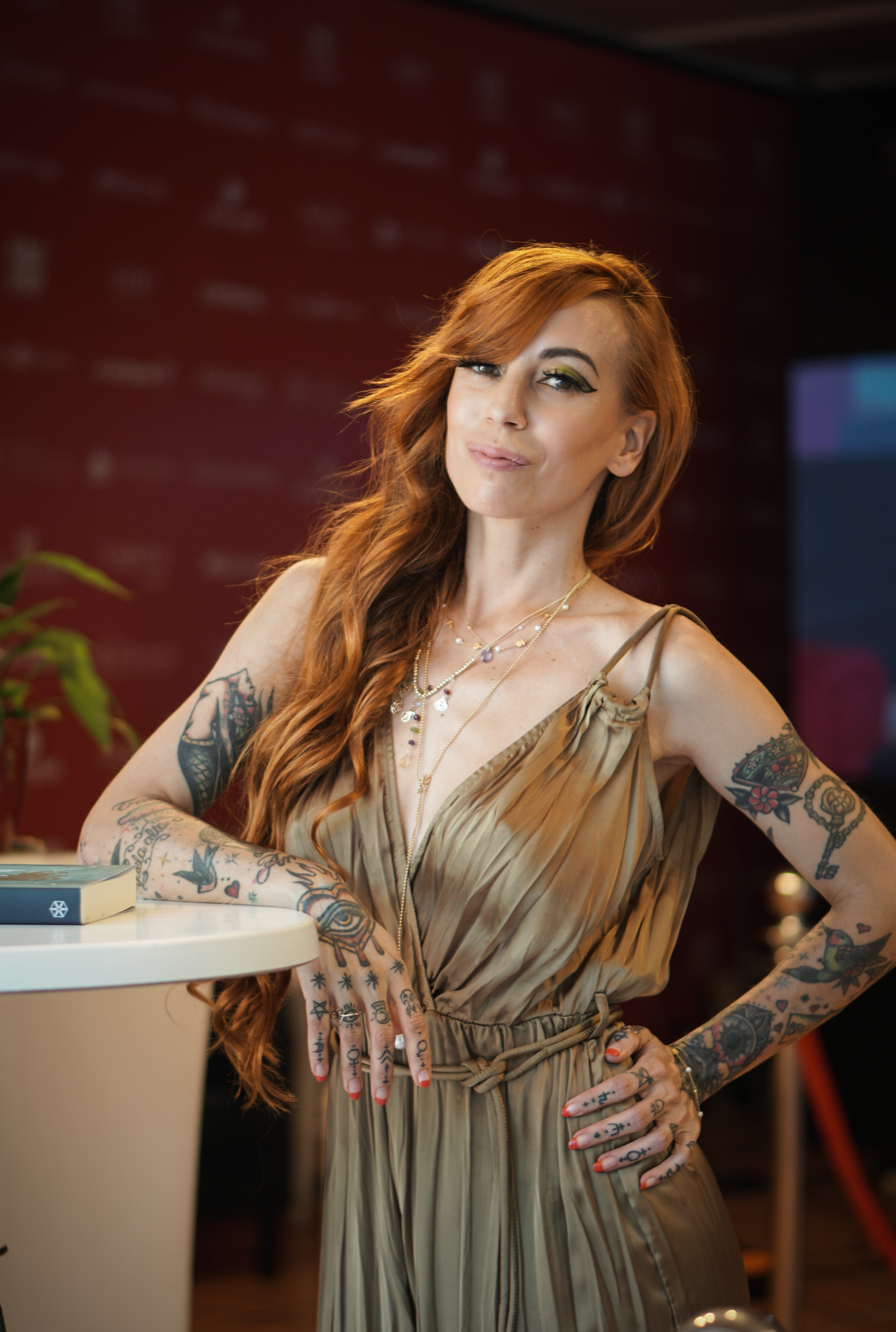
- Born: 1978 (age 47–48); Madrid
- Citizenship: Spanish
- Education: Royal Academy of Dance
- Occupations: Dancer, performer, producer, composer
- Style: Electronic Music
- Website: https://monicamossmusic.com/

Mónica Ramos Palomo, known as Monica Moss (Madrid, 1978), is a writer, composer, dancer, performer and independent producer of music and video clips, as well as an activist for women's rights. She has won several awards and honours.

== Formation ==
A dancer since the age of 4, she trained in classical ballet and obtained various certifications with honours at Cechetti and RAD (Royal Academy of Dance). While training and entering the world of music, she studied Clinical Psychology, graduating in 2001 from the Universidad Complutense de Madrid.

== Multidisciplinary artistic career ==
She was a pioneer of electronic music, the electropop sound fused with urban rhythms and sounds, and a singer at the main European electronic music parties: Scream Paris, Matinèe, Supermartxé... and has taken part in tours and gigs in various cities: Paris, Milan, Cairo, Moscow, Dubai...

She has also performed at the MADO - Madrid Gay Pride Festival 2015, 2016 and 2017, presented the Mad Cool Festival 2016 gala for Mediaset, at the Independent Music Awards (MIN) and provided the music for Atresmedia's "Ponle freno" race in 2017.

She has collaborated with DJs Dr. Kucho!, The Kickstarts and Jerry Ropero, as well as prominent rappers such as Chojin, Rayden, Nine Black (UK), Trad Montana, Sholo Truth, Mitsuruggy and Latex Diamond.

As a songwriter, composer, performer, producer and artistic director, she has produced 30 singles, 18 video clips and four solo albums: Moss Rules! (2013), Forever Perras (2016), Ritual (2019) and Astroqueen (2022).

As a multidisciplinary artist, she has mixed different artistic expressions (video, music and dance, blog, poetry and performances) in a kind of provocative and erotic appeal that has sometimes been censored, and at other times attracted great interest from the media and the press, as happened in 2015 with Carmen Oh!, her electronic version of Carmen by Bizet and Merimèe.

== Activist ==
Committed to women's rights, she works with various foundations and NGOs with disadvantaged groups and minors at risk of social exclusion, using music as a tool for transformation.

Committed to the management and development of intellectual property and musicians' rights, she is co-founder of A.M.C.E. (Asociación de mujeres Creadoras de Música en España), member of the board of A. M.P.E. (Asociación de Músicos Profesionales de España), the Fondo Asistencial y Cultural and the Consejo de Administración de la Sociedad de Artistas, Intérpretes y Ejecutantes (A.I.E.).

== Awards and recognitions ==
In 2010 she was nominated for the Spanish Music Awards alongside Dr Kucho and her track 'Lose Control'; she has twice been nominated for Best Electronic Female Vocalist (2011 and 2013) at the VMAs ( Vicious Music Awards) of the Electronic Music Awards. She was the winner of the IV Puro Cuatro Talent Contest (Mediaset) in the Dance category (2013). Her autobiographical book Color Karma "El Día que la Música murió en mí" (Editorial Samarcanda), received an honourable mention at the International Latino Books Awards 2022 (Los Angeles, California).

NOTE: Content in this biography was translated from the existing Spanish Wikipedia article at es:Monica Moss; see its history for attribution.
