= Marta Botía Alonso =

Spanish singer-songwriter

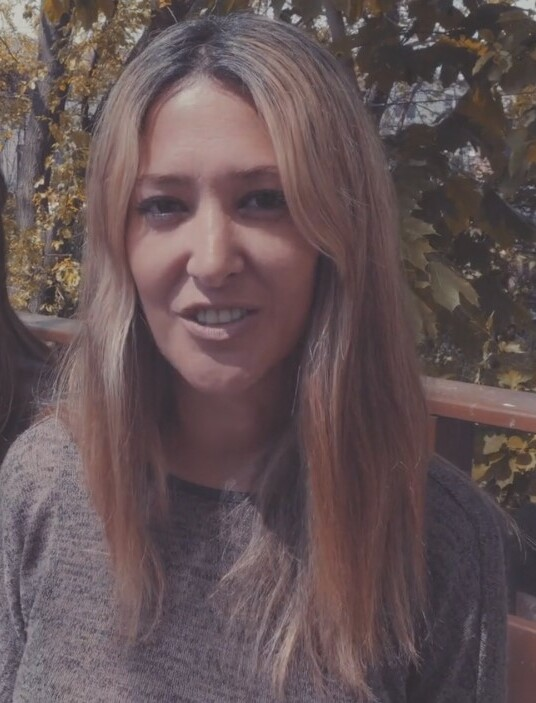

Marta Botía Alonso (born 15 September 1974 in Madrid) is a Spanish singer-songwriter. She has a sister named Lidia. Their father is a publicist and their mother is an Iberia director.

She grew up in Lavapiés block, in Madrid. Since she was a child, she showed a great interest in music and in the last course of high-school, she met Marilia Andrés Casares, with whom she created the band Ella baila sola, they split up in 2001.

== Discography ==
=== With Ella Baila Sola ===
- Ella Baila Sola (1996)
- EBS (1998)
- Marta y Marilia (2000)
- Grandes Éxitos (2001)

=== Solo albums ===
- Cumplir lo prometido (2003)
- Martamente (2015)
