= Chui (disambiguation) =

Chui may refer to:

== Surname ==
- Chui (surname)
- Cui (surname), Cantonese Chinese surname

== Places ==
In Kyrgyzstan:

- Chüy Region
- Chu (river) (also known as Chüy)

In South America:

- The contiguous towns of
  - Chuí, in Rio Grande do Sul, Brazil
  - Chuy, in Rocha Department, Uruguay
- Chuí Stream, on the Brazil-Uruguay border

== Other ==
- Chuí (Chinese weapon)
- An affectionate nickname for those with Jesus in their names
- Chui, light penalty in judoka

== See also ==
- Chuy (disambiguation)
- Choi (disambiguation)
