= Marilia Andrés Casares =

Spanish singer-songwriter

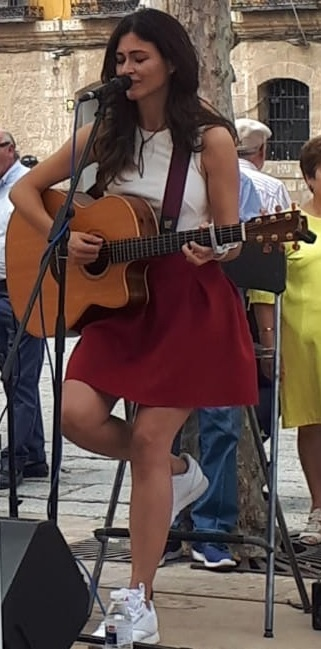
Marilia Andrés Casares

Marilia Andrés Casares (born 17 December 1974 in Cuenca) is a Spanish singer-songwriter.

Since she was a child, she showed a great interest in music and in the last course of high-school, she met Marta Botía, with whom she created the successful group Ella baila sola. They performed in several parks in Madrid until they recorded their first album in 1996. They split up in 2001. However, in 2021, the duo (original members Marta y Marilia) reunited to perform a few live concerts in celebration of their 25th anniversary.

== Discography ==
=== With Ella Bala Sola ===
- Ella Baila Sola (1996)
- EBS (1998)
- Marta y Marilia (2000)
- Grandes Éxitos (2001)
- Colección Definitiva 25 Aniversario (2021)

=== Solo albums ===
- Subir una montaña (2012)
- Infinito (2017)

=== Singles ===
- Mi Dragon (2019)
- Me Voy (2019)
- Volver a los Diecisiete (2018)
- Claro Que Hace Falta Hablar (2017)
- Si No Es un Si Es un No (2017)
- Infinito (2017)
- Superviviente (2017)
- Entra (2017)
- Subir una Montana (2012)
- Una Luz (2017)
- Senoras (2012)
- Marilyn y Superman (2012)
- Casi Me Rindo (2012)
