= Obsesión (Sangre Azul album) =

Studio album by Sangre Azul
- Released: 1987
- Recorded: September 1986
- Studios: Estudios Mediterráneo, Ibiza
- Genres: Glam metal, AOR
- Label: Hispavox
- Producers: Sangre Azul, Vicente "Mariskal" Romero

Sangre Azul chronology
Obsesión (1987)	Cuerpo a cuerpo (1988)

Singles from Obsesión
- 1. "América" / "Invadiendo tu Ciudad" Released: 1987; 2. "Todo Mi Mundo Eres Tú" / "Maestro del crimen" Released: 1987

Obsesión is the first album by Spanish glam metal band Sangre Azul, released in 1987 by Hispavox.

== Track listing ==
*All tracks by Sangre Azul, except where noted

Side one

1. "Obsesión" 3:18
2. "Sediento de sangre" 4:05
3. "Todo mi mundo eres tú" (Letra: José Castañosa; Música: Carlos Raya / J.A. Martín) 4:25
4. "Velocidad" 2:56
5. "El rey de la ciudad" (Letra: José Castañosa; Música: Carlos Raya / J.A. Martín) 4:35

Side two

1. "América" 4:00
2. "Maestro del crimen" 3:33
3. "Tras de ti" 3:36
4. "Sólo fue un sueño" 3:28
5. "Invadiendo tu ciudad" 3:16

== Personnel ==
- Tony Solo - vocals
- Carlos Raya - guitar
- J. A. Martín - guitar
- Julio Díaz - bass
- Luis Santurde - drums
- James SK Wān - bamboo flute
