= El Chojin =

Spanish rapper and songwriter

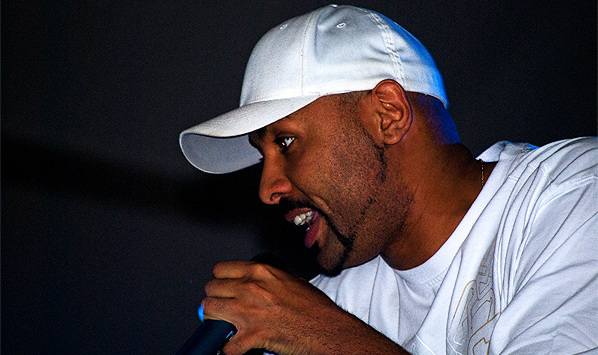
- El Chojín rapping at Azuqueca de Henares.

Background information
- Born: Domingo Edjang Moreno; 28 April 1977 (age 49); Torrejón de Ardoz, Madrid, Spain
- Genre: Hip hop
- Occupations: Rapper; singer; songwriter
- Years active: 1992–present
- Labels: BoaCor/Boa Music; Revelde; PIAS Spain
- Formerly of: 995
- Website: www.elchojin.net

Domingo Antonio Edjang Moreno (born 28 April 1977), better known by his stage name El Chojin (pronounced as in Japanese Chōjin, not with a Spanish J), is a Spanish rapper and songwriter. He is the current Guinness World Record holder for most syllables rapped in one minute.

== Early life ==
Chojin was born in Torrejón de Ardoz, Madrid, to a father from Equatorial Guinea and an Extremaduran (Spanish) mother.

== Career ==
El Chojin takes his name from the Overfiend in the hentai anime Urotsukidōji. During the first part of his rap career, he was a member of the WFN crew ("Wild for da Night"), so called after a Rampage/Busta Rhymes song of the same name. He was later part of the group 995 and with them released four albums.

As a solo artist he has put out twelve LPs as of 2013, including Cuando Hay Obstáculos... and ...Jamás Intentes Negarlo (the initials of those two titles spelling out C.H.O.J.I.N.). After his first five full-length solo records, in 2004 Chojin returned with a demo, Rap por placer, available as a free download.

In early 2005, his eighth LP 8jin was released. The record tackles such issues as professionalism in rap and violence against women. The album cover was chosen from among almost 400 submissions, from a contest organized by the rapper through his webpage.

In 2007 he released Striptease, an album in which he "bares" his soul. It is a collaboration with various producers, both veteran and new, and includes instrumentation such as guitars, harmonicas, pianos, and a gospel chorus. The following year he released Aún rap por placer, a follow-up to his previous demo, consisting of six solo tracks and one featuring Duo Kie. Like its predecessor, it could also be legally downloaded for free.

In March 2009, he released Cosas que pasan, que no pasan y que deberían pasar (Things that Happen, Don't Happen, and Should Happen), a 30-track album with a diverse array of contributors, including Locus from Duo Kie, Maika Sitté from blues band Red House, comedian El Gran Wyoming, and singer-songwriter Luis Eduardo Aute, as well as others.

Chojin is known for the social commentary of his lyrics, his solo record Mi turno being perhaps his most "radical" work. He avoids coarse language in his music, and his raps also frequently espouse non-violence, anti-racism, and warn of the dangers of drugs and alcohol. One of the main themes covered on most albums is the discrimination against and general mistreatment of immigrants. Although, being born and raised in Spain, he is not an immigrant himself, he is well aware of the problems they face. As is reflected in his songs "Yo no soy de esos", "Mami, el negro está rabioso", and "Cara sucia", he has suffered such discrimination due to the colour of his skin. He also is known for his track "Lola", promoting condom use, which came to be used in a Barcelona contraceptive awareness campaign. Amnesty International used one of his songs (featuring Meko and Kraze Negroze) for their "Ponte en mi piel" ("Put Yourself in My Skin") campaign, another attempt to raise awareness, this time regarding immigration, and, with the release of 8jin, Amnesty selected "El final del cuento de hadas" ("The End of the Fairy Tale") for a campaign against gender-based violence.

In addition to lyrics, Chojin has also written poetry and various articles. In 2007, he wrote and starred in El alma de Alexander Oboe (The Soul of Alexander Oboe), a play produced by Casa de los Pueblos, which debuted at the Festival Madrid Sur and went on to tour various theatres in Spain. While finishing and preparing for the launch of his first book, 98 rimas y 7 leyendas (98 Rhymes and 7 Legends), he has collaborated on movie soundtracks such as Tánger and created what he calls "the first rap opera in Spanish", entitled Rimas para todos los públicos (Rhymes for All Audiences).

Since 28 January 2010, El Chojin has appeared every Wednesday on Noticias 2, performing a rap summarizing the week's news.

=== World record ===
On 23 December 2008, El Chojin appeared on Telecinco in an attempt to break Rebel XD's record, but failed to rap more than 852 syllables within 42.2 seconds. El Chojin did however create his own separate record from Rebel XD, where he took 1 minute to rap 921 syllables, which came out to be 15 syllables per second on his song titled "Vo-ca-li-za". Rebel XD rapped 20 syllables per second.

As of January 2015, no one has beaten the 852 syllables in 42 seconds record, or the 921 in 60 seconds record, except Outsider whose attempt did surpass El Chojin by 2 syllables per second but wasn't accepted because he rapped in Korean.

== Discography ==
=== With 995 ===
- 995 (2001)
- II (2002)
- III: Kompetición (2003)
- K2 – Kompetición II (2004)

=== Solo releases ===
- 100% = 10.000 (Mi estilo) (maxi) (Revelde Discos, 1997) – 100% =10.000 (My Style)
- Mi Turno (LP) (Revelde Discos, 1999) – My Turn
- El nivel sube (LP) (Revelde Discos, 2000) – The Level Rises
- Lola (maxi) (Boa Music, 2001)
- Sólo para adultos (LP) (Boa Music, 2001) – Adults Only
- Cuando Hay Obstáculos... (LP) (Boa Music, 2002) – When There Are Obstacles...
- ...Jamás Intentes Negarlo (LP) (Boa Music, 2003) – ...Never Try to Deny It
- Rap por placer (demo) (independent, 2004) - Rap for Pleasure
- 8jin (LP) (Bombo Records, 2005)
- Rap positivo (maxi) (PIAS Spain, 2007) – Positive Rap
- Striptease (LP) (PIAS Spain, 2007)
- Aún rap por placer (demo) (2008) – Still, Rap For Pleasure
- Cosas que pasan, que no pasan y que deberían pasar (LP) (Boa Music, 2009) – Things that Happen, Things that Don't Happen, and Things that Should Happen
- El ataque de los que observaban (LP) (Sony Music Entertainment España, S.L., 2011) – The Attack of Those Who Were Observing
- I.R.A. (Instinto, Razon, Autobiografia) (LP) (Sony Music Entertainment España, S.L., 2013) - I.R.A. (Instinct, Reason, Autobiography)
- Energía (LP) (Sony Music Entertainment España, S.L., 2015) - Energy
- Recalculando ruta (LP) (Frida Ediciones, 2017) - Recalculating route

=== Collaborations ===
- El Meswy "Tesis doctoral" (1997)
- Frank T "Los pájaros no pueden vivir en el agua porque no son peces" (1998)
- Frank T "La gran obra maestra" (1998)
- Black Bee "La Homilía" (1998)
- Zeta "Hacia el infinito" (1999)
- Zeta "Guateque" (1999)
- Zenit "Sólo para adultos" (2001)
- DJ Paco aka DJ Jam "69 Studio el plan perfecto" (2001)
- Makamersim "Original Dancehall" (2002)
- La Konexión "Destilando stylo" (2003)
- Meko y Kraze "AK-47" (2003)
- Jefe de la M "Entra el dragón" (2003)
- Bombo Records "Kompetición" (2003)
- Duo Kie "El rap es esto" (2004)
- Meko "Zona de guerra" (2004)
- Bombo Records "K2: Kompetición II" (2004)
- Destroyer "Amor por esto" (2005)
- Lydia "El final del cuento de hadas" (2005)
- Panzers "Resurrección" (2005)
- Sindicato Argentino del Hip Hop "Sangre, sudor y furia" (2005)
- Various artists "Tiempo de kambio" (2006)
- Black Bee "Génesis" (2006)
- Dlux "Encadenadas"(2007)
- Estado Mental "Ahórrate el psicologo"(2007)
- Duo Kie "21-centímetros"(2008)
- Nach "Hemos creado un monstruo"
- Morodo, Meko, Ose & Black Bee "Estoy cansao"
- Frost and MC Say "2 legendarios" (2009)
- Akil Ammar "Singular" (2016)

=== Videography ===
- "Si mi chica se llamara Shakira"
- "Superhéroe"
- "Quisiera ser"
- "No más"
- "Lola"
- "Rap contra el racismo"

== See also ==
- Spanish hip hop
- NoClue
- Outsider
