= Kedir =

Kedir is a surname. Notable people with the surname include:

- Haile Micael Kedir (born 1944), Ethiopian cyclist
- Mohamed Kedir (born 1954), Ethiopian runner
- Muktar Kedir (fl. 1999–present), Ethiopian politician

== See also ==
- Keir
