= Sonblue =

Spanish pop group

- Origin: Córdoba, Spain
- Genres: Pop, pop-rock
- Years active: 2006–present
- Website: www.sonblue.com

Sonblue is a Spanish pop group.

== Members ==
- Nacho [born July 10, 1987] (vocals)
- Salva [born June 23, 1989] (guitar)
- Manu [born December 31, 1987] (guitar)
- Carlos [born May 29, 1989] (bass)
- Alex [born July 23, 1987] (drums)

== Biography ==
The group was initially consisted of 5 teenagers which were studying in the same school in Córdoba, where they organized their punk-rock group. When Álex received a guitar as his Christmas gift, he decided to commence practicing in playing guitar together with Manu. They convinced Nacho to begin singing in their group, which had been firstly named Someblue before they found their present name Soneblue. During their rehearsal they came to the idea to be dressed in the used school uniform which featured them now. Under the influence of International groups the likes of Blink 182, Good Charlotte, Green Day, Sum 41, and inspired by their national groups and artistes such as Dickers, El Canto del Loco and others they began writing their own songs.

Sonblue made their debut as a band last 2006 with their first single "Sueños De Ayer" (English: "Yesterday Dreams"), which reached #3 in the official list of Spanish singles Promusicae. After this success, on June 12, they released their first album with the same degree as the single. Their following singles were only promotional: "¿Dónde Está El Amor?" (English: "Where This Love?)") and in the autumn of 2006 they released two double promotional singles: "Ahora Toca Imaginar" (English: "Now It Has To Imagine") and "Lo Mejor De Mi" (English: "The Best of Me").

In February 2007 they continue with their tour performing concerts in Barcelona, Seville, Madrid... They are nowadays preparing what will be their second album, which might be ready for summer 2007.

== Discography ==
Sueños De Ayer

Studio album by Sonblue
- Released: June 12, 2006
- Recorded: 2005/2006
- Genre: Pop Rock Punk

Album Information
Sueños De Ayer
- Released: June 12, 2006 (SPA)
- Sales: +6,500
- Official singles:
  - 2006: "Sueños De Ayer" — #3 (SPA)
  - 2006: "Donde Esta El Amor" promo
  - 2006: "Ahora Toca Imaginar" / "Lo Mejor De Mi" promo

=== Full track listing ===
1. "Especial"
2. "Na Na Na"
3. "Tu y Yo"
4. "Sólo Dímelo"
5. "Mi Mundo De Papel"
6. "Lo Mejor De Mí"
7. "En Forma De Estrella"
8. "Sueños De Ayer"
9. "Ahora Toca Imaginar"
10. "Dónde Esta El Amor"
11. "Mundo Loco"
12. "Un Día Gris"
