= Un Pingüino en mi Ascensor =

Spanish band

Un Pingüino en mi Ascensor (A Penguin in my Elevator in Spanish) is a Spanish music band.

The band was formed in the 80s by the attorney José Luis Moro, the singer and composer of the songs. Mario Gil (La Mode and Aviador Dro) produced some of the records, elevating the overall quality of the songs.

The musical style of the compositions is deliberately cheesy and corny, which contrasts with the lyrics, which use black humor, sarcasm and irony in a way that it only makes sense in the "everything is valid" punk rock creative impulse of La Movida in Madrid during the 1980s.
