= Bajoqueta rock =

Music group

Bajoqueta rock is a Spanish rock group who sings in valencian and founded in 1986 in Riba-roja de Túria. The band is very popular in Valencian Community and Catalonia cause they eccentricals village lyrics with a huge sense of humor.

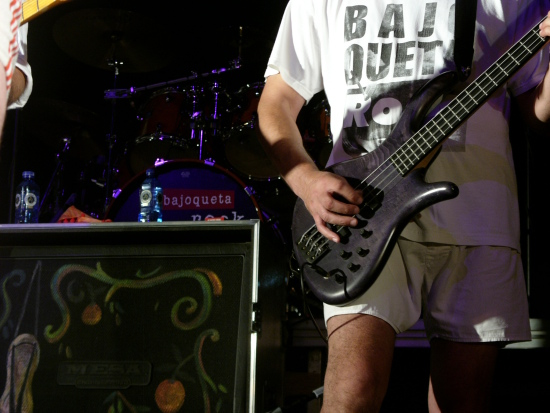
Bajoqueta rock

== Discography ==
- A pèl (1998)
- Amb dos pinyols (2001)
- Retruqu3 (2004)
- Ie, el de l'oli (2010)
