= Jub Khaleh-ye Sofla =

Jub Khaleh-ye Sofla جوب خله سفلي
- Village
- Location within Iran
- Coordinates: 30°32′48″N 51°53′37″E
- Country: Iran
- Province: Fars
- County: Sepidan
- Bakhsh: Central
- Rural District: Komehr

Population (2006)
  - Total: 63
- Time zone: UTC+3:30 (IRST)
  - Summer (DST): UTC+4:30 (IRDT)

Jub Khaleh-ye Sofla (Persian: جوب خله سفلي, also Romanized as Jūb Khaleh-ye Soflá and Jūbkhaleh-ye Soflá; also known as Jūb Khaleh-ye Pā’īn and Jūy Khaleh Pā’īn) is a village in Komehr Rural District, in the Central District of Sepidan County, Fars province, Iran. At the 2006 census, its population was 63, in 13 families.
