= Contradanza (band) =

Spanish folk/acoustic music band

Contradanza is a folk and acoustic music band formed in 1998 in Seville (Andalusia, Spain), playing traditional music as well as original compositions in the style.

Contradanza offers a different perspective of folk and traditional music by collecting various influences they manage to blend in their acoustic mixer: traditional music, flamenco, jazz, Arab music, renaissance dances. Special focus is set on the revision of traditional ballads and of Andalusian popular lyrical poems as well as on the composition of their own pieces based on the study of contemporary Spanish poetry.

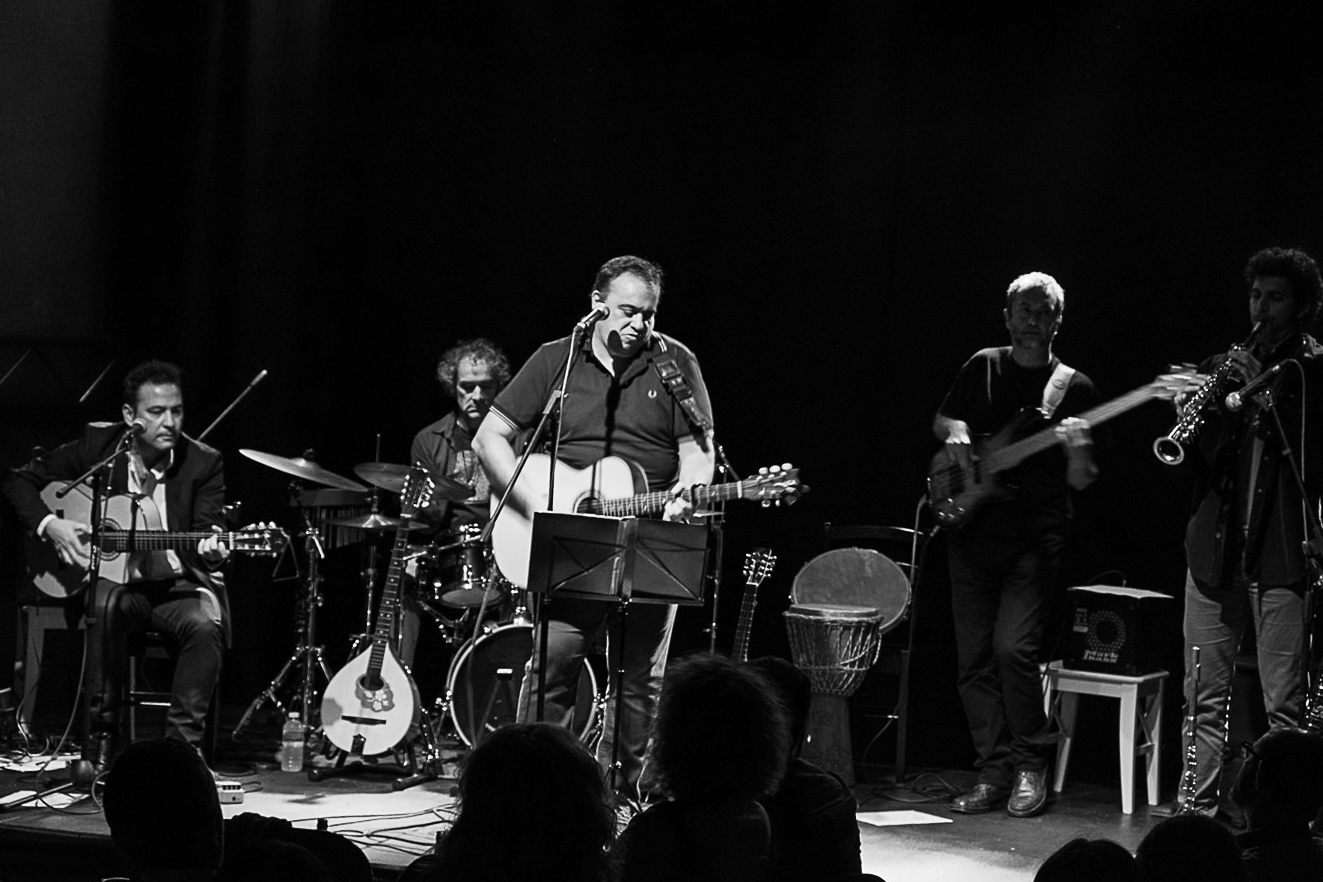
Contradanza en Granada

== Discography ==
- Mar de Fondo (Galileo, 2003)
- Meridional (Galileo, 2006)
- Tentenelaire (Galileo, 2010)
- Desconcierto (Live) (Etnomeridional, 2010)

== Band members ==
- Ricardo de Castro: Acoustic guitar, mandola and voice.
- Luis Gómez "El Canario": Saxes and flutes.
- Fernando García Conde: drums, Arab & African percussion (djembe, bendhir, darbuka...)...
- Julio Castell. Flamenco and electric guitar, ukulele, buzuki, banjo.
- Antón Ramírez: Bass.
