= Sangre Azul =

- Origin: Madrid, Spain
- Genres: Pop metal, hard rock, AOR
- Years active: 1982-1992
- Label: Hispavox

Sangre Azul were a Spanish glam metal / AOR band from Madrid, active from 1982 to 1992. The group had a short-lived reunion in 2005.

== Career ==
Sangre Azul was founded in Pinto, Madrid in 1982 by José Castañosa “Lili” (vocals), J.A. Martin & Carlos Raya (guitars), Julio Díaz (bass), and Luis Santurde (drums). They won the "Trofeo Rock Villa de Madrid", a contest for new bands organized by the City Council of Madrid, which allowed them to be featured on a split release with two more bands.

In 1985 the group recorded and released an EP with four songs through an independent company. After this, vocalist "Lili" Castañosa quits the band, being replaced by Tony Solo (ex-Muro). Eventually, their manager secured them a contract with Hispavox, a major Spanish label, subsidiary of EMI Records, with whom they released three studio albums: Obsesión (1987), Cuerpo a cuerpo (1988), and El silencio de la noche (1989).

The group finally disbanded in 1992, due to the lack of support from their company, and the general decline of the melodic hard rock and pop metal style. In 2005, original singer "Lili" Castañosa re-activated the group with a different line-up for a few shows.

== Discography ==
- Sangre Azul EP (1985)
- Obsesión (1987)
- Cuerpo a cuerpo (1988)
- El silencio de la noche (1989)
