= Skizoo =

Spanish metal band

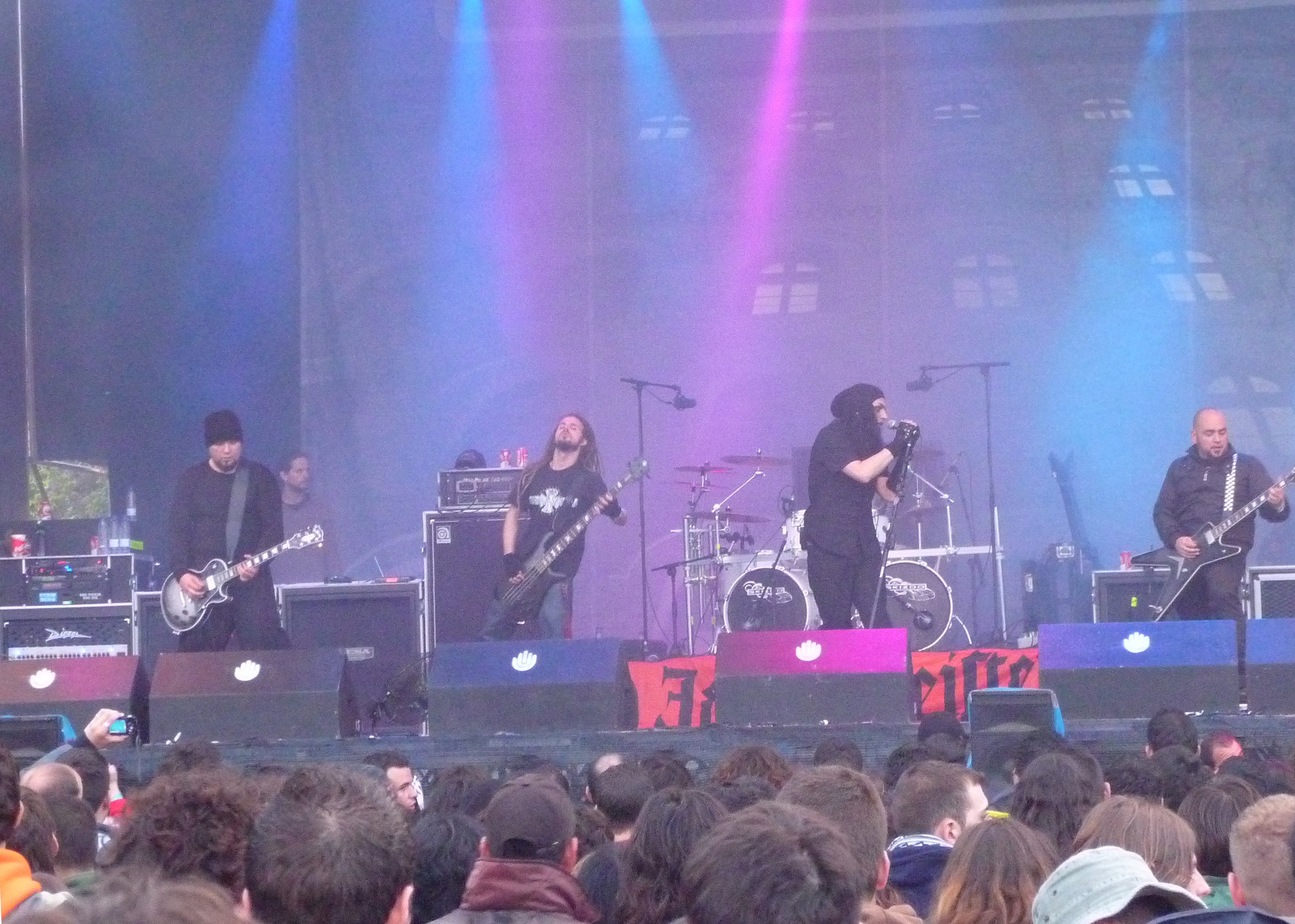

Background information
- Origin: Madrid, Spain
- Genres: Alternative metal Post-grunge
- Years active: 2005–2010
- Labels: EMI
- Members: Morti; Jorge Escobedo; Antonio Bernardini; Dani Pérez; Edu Fernandez

Skizoo was a Spanish alternative metal band from Madrid formed in 2005.

== History ==
Sôber split in 2005, and Carlos Escobedo and Alberto Madrid formed Savia and Antonio Bernardini and Jorge Escobedo formed Skizoo. Drummer Daniel Perez, bassist Daniel Criado and singer Morti recorded their debut eponymous album, released in May 2005. Daniel Criado left the group and joined Edu Fernandez. They recorded a second album, Incerteza, launched on February 19, 2007.

== Band members ==
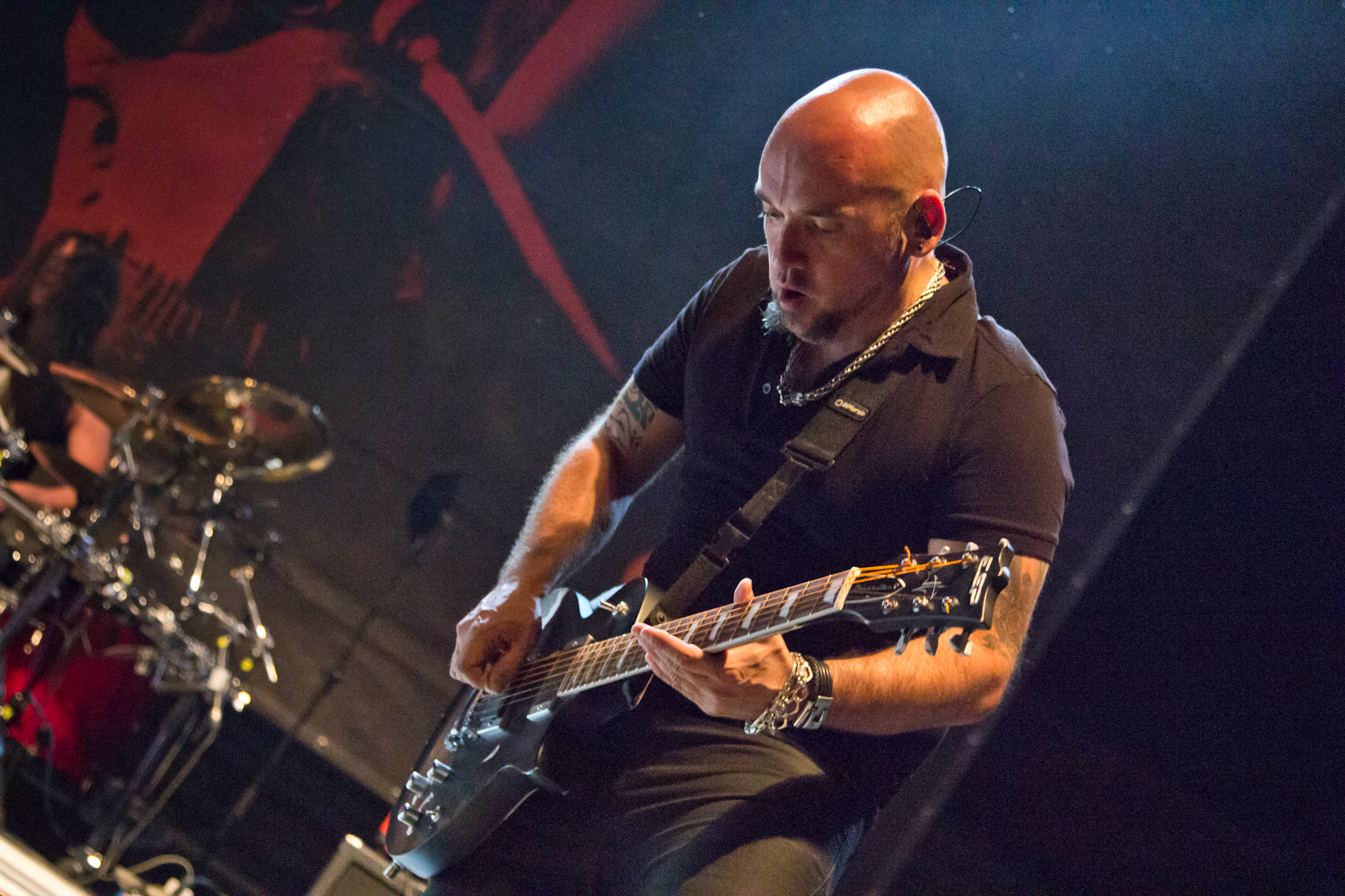
Jorge Escobedo in 2013.

Final lineup

- Morti - vocals
- Jorge Escobedo - guitars
- Antonio Bernardini - guitars
- Dani Pérez - drums
- Edu Fernandez - bass (2005–2010)

Past members

- Daniel Criado - bass (2005)

== Discography ==
Studio albums

- Skizoo (2005)
- 2007: "Incerteza (2007)
- 3 (2008)
- La Cara Oculta (2008)
