= Elefantes (band) =

Spanish pop band

Elefantes is a Spanish band playing pop music

The band is composed of musicians Jordi Ramiro (drum), Julio Cascán (bass guitar), Hugo (guitar) and Shuarma (vocals and composer of the musical themes).

The band was formed in 1994. In 2006 they announced that they were splitting up to focus on their solo careers however in 2013 they announced that they were back, and they have been active since then.

== Discography ==
=== EP ===
- Elefantes - (1996)

=== Albums ===
- El hombre pez - (1998)
- Azul - (EMI, 2000)
- Azul en acústico - (EMI, 2001)
- La forma de mover tus manos - (EMI, 2003)
- La forma de mover tus manos y otros paisajes - (EMI, 2004) - (CD|Doble CD)
- Somos nubes blancas - (EMI, 2005)
- Gracias - (EMI, 2006) - (CD|Doble CD recopilatorio + DVD (Concierto + Videoclips))
- El rinoceronte - (Warner, 2014)
- Nueve canciones de amor y una de esperanza - (Warner, 2016)
- La primera luz del día - (Warner, 2018)
- Trozos de papel / Cosas raras - (Warner, 2022)
- Para Todos - (Warner, 2026)

=== Singles ===
- "El hombre pez" - (AZ, 1998)
- "Azul" - (EMI, 2001)
- "Piedad" - (EMI, 2001)
- "Se me va" - (EMI, 2001)
- "Me gustaría poder hacerte feliz" (sencillo promocional EMI, 2001)
- "Me falta el aliento" - (sencillo promocional EMI, 2003)
- "Que yo no lo sabía" - (sencillo promocional EMI, 2003)
- " Que yo no lo sabía, con Antonio Vega"' - (sencillo promocional EMI, 2003)
- "Tan difícil como amar" - (sencillo promocional EMI, 2003)
- "Al olvido" - (sencillo promocional EMI, 2004)
- "Somos nubes blancas" - (sencillo promocional EMI, 2004)
- "Abre más ancho el camino" - (sencillo promocional EMI, 2004)
- "Equilibrios" - (Warner Music, 2014)
- "Descargas eléctricas" - (Warner Music, 2014)
- "Aún más alto" - (Warner Music, 2014)
- "Momentos" - (Warner Music, 2015)
- "Te quiero (versión de Jose Luis Perales)" - (Warner Music, 2015)
- "Duele" - (Warner Music, 2016)
- "Que todo el mundo sepa que te quiero" - (Warner Music, 2017)
- "Cada vez" - (Warner Music, 2017)
- "Deja el aire correr" - (Warner Music, 2022)
- "Mañana" - (Warner Music, 2022)
- "El Gran Salón" - (Warner Music, 2022)
- "Tu ya lo sabes" - (Warner Music, 2022)
