= Al-Firdaus Ensemble =

Sufi musical group

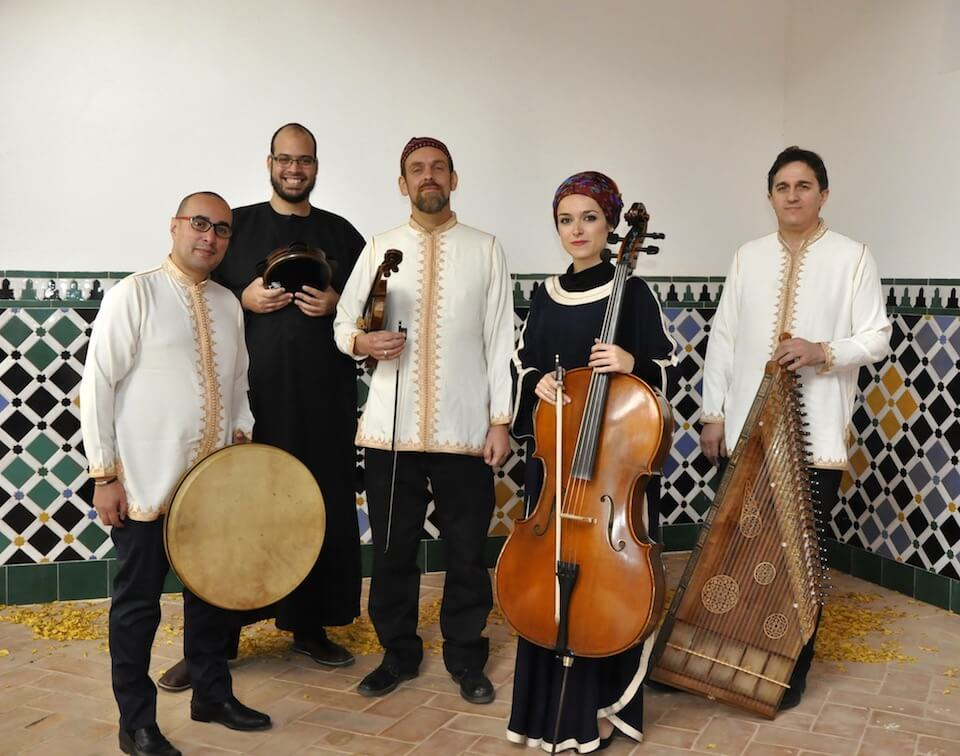
Members of Al-Firdaus Ensemble

Al Firdaus Ensemble is a Sufi musical group based in Granada, Spain. Founded in 2012 by the English singer Ali Keeler, the ensemble consists of musicians from England, Spain, Morocco and Venezuela.

== Name ==
The name of the ensemble is inspired by the Arabic word "Firdaus", the Arabic name for the highest garden in paradise from an Islamic perspective.

== Musical style ==
The ensemble follows a combination of different musical styles, such as western classical sounds, Celtic music and flamenco, as well as new arrangements of numerous pieces from traditional Islamic Sufi music, which originate from Arabic, Andalusian and Turkish sources. The lyrics are mostly in Arabic and inspired by the poetry of the well-known Sufis of Al-Andalus as well as from the Arab world such as Ibn Arabi and Al-Shushtari. In addition, its repertoire consists of musical adaptations of poems in old Spanish (called Aljamiado), which the Moriscos wrote down using Arabic script. The ensemble uses a variety of instruments, a combination of Persian, Arabic and Turkish (e.g. Oud, Daf, Darbuka, Riq, Ney longitudinal flute) and western classical instruments (e.g. violin, cello) as well the flamenco guitar. The ensemble consists of a number of singers, some of whom are soloists and others who sing in choirs.

== Discography ==
- Safa (2014)
- Nur (2017)
- Shifa (2022)
