= Morodo =

Telecommunication company

- Company type: Privately held company
- Industry: Telecommunications
- Founded: 2006
- Headquarters: London, United Kingdom
- Key people: Andrew Reid, CEO & Co-Founder
- Number of employees: 25
- Website: www.morodogroup.com

Morodo is a software based provider of the low-cost and free communication service called MO-Call which includes desktop, mobile and web applications. It enables low cost text messaging, low cost international calls and instant messaging services, saving its users up to 90% on phone bills compared to the cost of traditional mobile and fixed operators. Morodo’s mobile applications feature direct calling, callback, VoIP and SMS. The desktop application features include VoIP, SMS and Instant Messaging . Morodo’s applications are supported on 95% of all handsets on the market today, as well as a desktop application supporting Windows XP, Vista and 7, Mac OS X and Linux. The mobile application works in more than 200 countries around the world.

== Technology ==
Morodo’s mobile application, MO-Call, supports over 2000 handsets across iOS, BlackBerry, Android, Symbian, Java and Windows Mobile. The desktop version of MO-Call was developed in QT and supports Windows, Mac and Linux.

To use MO-Call on smart phones, the application can be minimised to the background of the phone and will recognize international numbers and route the call onto Morodo’s network. Calls can be connected to Morodo’s network via a local access number, a call back or over an internet data channel such as Wi-Fi or 3G. SMS works by converting the text into data and then delivered via the internet connection through the Morodo network. The MO-Call app also supports VoIP calling where calls are connected using Voice Over Internet Protocol.
