= Bravo Johnson =

- Origin: Santander, Spain
- Genres: Americana, blues, folk, classic rock
- Years active: 2006-present
- Label: Stone Junction

Bravo Johnson is a band led by the Spanish songwriter Ricardo Amurrio. The music of Bravo Johnson covers a variety of genres including blues, Americana, classic rock, and folk. Bravo Johnson has been played on radio stations nationwide, and was called one of the potential "breakthrough artists of 2008".

Amurrio, the band's lead singer and songwriter, provided the soundtrack of the Bernardo Bertolucci film Cinema Sex Politics: Bertolucci Makes "The Dreamers".

== Discography ==
- 2006 - Aimlessly Drifting
- 2008 - The Crooked and the Straight
