= Kaxta =

Spanish rock band

- Origin: Badajoz, Extremadura, Spain
- Genres: Rock
- Years active: 2007–present
- Members: Isidoro Gil "el Isi"; Juan Carlos Preciado "el Pi"; Rafael Rodríguez; Javier López; Kike Fernández
- Past members: Martín; Dani
- Website: kaxta.com

Kaxta is a Spanish rock band from Badajoz, Extremadura. The group consists of Isi, Pi, Kike, López and Rafa. The band was created in 2007 out of members from other bands from Extremadura such as Distrito Desperado, Veinte:30, Última Hora, Línea Mortal or Alergia.

== History ==
The band was founded in 2007. A month after their official formation they recorded their first EP “La cuenta atrás” (The countdown). Kaxta started to play some live shows and continued to work until the band’s first album, named: “No soy un bicho raro” (I’m not a weirdo), produced by Álvaro Gandul and Pepe Bao came (pasado) out in 2009. Recognized musicians such as/like Manolo Chinato or Juanjo Pizarro collaborated on this first project.

One of their founding members, Martín, had to leave the band because of some personal problems and was replaced by Dani. Rafa Rodriguez (their sound technician) joined the band as their main guitarist to record their second album “Arremeto” (I lash out), released in 2011. They toured the country with this album.

Not only have they accomplished many things they've also been finalists in important competitions like “Antigua Rock”, “Perro Rock” and “el DycRectos”. Kaxta has also shared the stage with well-known groups such as Sinkope. After playing over 200 shows, the band got back in the studio in 2014 and released their latest album “Centro de Intoxicación” (Habilitation center).

They have been touring the country since 2008 and have been playing in a huge number of clubs in Spain. Also at important festivals as “Viña rock” or “Shikillo”.

== Band members ==
=== Current ===
- Isidoro Gil " el Isi" (lead vocals and guitar)
- Juan Carlos Preciado "el Pi" (bass guitar)
- Rafael Rodriguez (lead guitar)
- Javi López (rhythm guitar)
- Kike Fernández (drums)

=== Past ===
- Martín (drums)
- Dani (drums)

== Discography ==
EP La cuenta atrás (2007):

1. No se porke
2. Hechizo de luna
3. Ciudad infundada
4. La cuenta atrás

No soy un bicho raro (2009):

1. La ciudad de los vampiros
2. Agua pal sembrao
3. Cochambre
4. Ciudad infundada
5. No se porke
6. Hechizo de luna
7. Mar de refranes
8. Dulce locura
9. La cuenta atrás
10. Sabio del pastor

Arremeto (2011):

1. Bésame
2. Dame de mamar
3. Por las buenas o por las malas
4. No queda nada
5. Arremeto
6. Los pájaros de mi cabeza
7. En otra dirección
8. Salvaje y libre
9. Sudor y frio
10. Princesa
11. Y qué dirán las flores

Centro de Intoxicación (2014):

1. Dentro de mi
2. Nada me para
3. ¡¡Explosión!!
4. Corazón
5. Malos pelos
6. Jícaras de chocolate
7. Centro de intoxicación
8. Efímero
9. Entre cuatro paredes
