= La Musgaña =

Spanish folk music ensemble

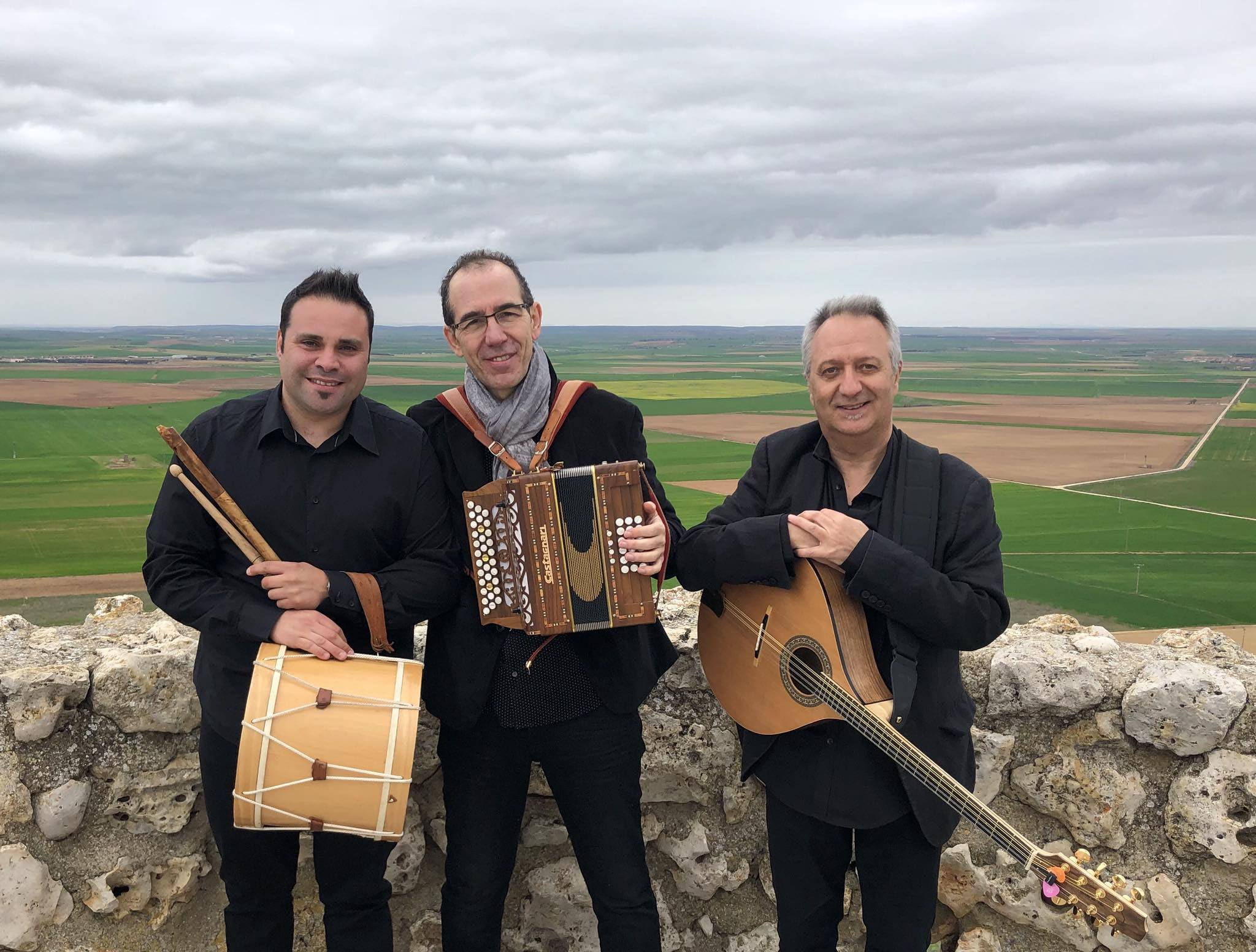
La Musgaña - Spanish folk music ensemble

La Musgaña is a Spanish folk music ensemble, founded in 1986 by Enrique Almendros, José María Climent and Rafa Martin. The band incorporates various instruments such as the salterio, fiddle, hurdy-gurdy, bagpipes, flutes, guitar and bass, and performs traditional music from the Iberian peninsula, mostly from the Spanish regions of Castile, Zamora, Leon, Extremadura and La Mancha. "musgaña" means "shrew" in Spanish.

== Biography ==
La Musgaña was founded when Almendros, a former Irish music performer, joined Climent and Martin in 1986. Six months later flutist Jaime Muñoz and bassist Carlos Beceiro were added to the line-up.

Their 1988 debut album "El Diablo Cojuelo" won the Spanish National Folk Award for young performers and propelled them through the ranks of Spanish music. Their second album, El Paso de la Estantigua, was signed under the Radio Nacional Espana label in 1989.

Their third album, Lubicán, released in 1991 under Xenophile-Green Linnet label, was their first release in North America and gave them international fame, but later in the year original members Climont and Martin left the band, and were replaced with Cuco Pérez, on the accordion, and composer, percussionist and hurdy-gurdy player Luis Delgado. The next year they made their first concert in the United States.

A fourth album, Las Seis Tentaciones, was released in 1995, under the Xenophile-Green Linnet label.

== Members ==
- Jaime Muñoz (Clarinets, accordion, saxophone, flutes, Bulgarian bagpipe)
- Carlos Beceiro (Bouzouki, guitar, bass)
- Luis Antonio Pedraza (three hole flute and drum, bagpipes from Aliste and Sanabria, singing and tambourine)
- Jorge Arribas (Accordion)
- Diego Galaz (Violin)
- Luis Delgado (Hurdy-gurdy, percussions)

Former members

- Enrique Almendros [Bagpipes (gaita de fole), 3-holed flute and tabor (gaita charra y tamboril), salterio 1986-2004
- José María Climent (Violin, bagpipes) 1986-1991
- Rafa Martin (Hurdy-gurdy, guitar) 1986-1991

== Discography ==
- 1988: La Musgaña
- 1989: El Paso de la Estantigua
- 1991: Lubicán
- 1992: El Diablo Cojuelo
- 1997: La Musgaña en Concierto
- 1998: Las Seis Tentaciones
- 2003: Temas Profanos
- 2008: 20
- 2009: Idas y Venidas
