= Tardy (surname) =

The surname Tardy has several origins. It is an old French family name. It may also refer to a number of families of Hungarian nobility: Tardy alias Lélek, Tardy alias Pap, Tardy alias Szeles, Tardy de Csaholy, Tardy de Kisár, Tardy de Kőröstopa et Mezőtelegd, Tardy de Tard.

Notable people with the surname include:

- Donald Tardy (born 1970), American drummer
- Fernand Tardy (1919–2017), French politician
- Gregory Tardy (born 1966), American jazz saxophonist
- Jacque Alexander Tardy (1767–1827), French pirate
- James Tardy, (between 1773 and 1787 – 1835), Irish naturalist
- John Tardy (born 1968), American singer
- Joshua Tardy, American politician
- Lionel Tardy (born 1966), French politician
- Louis-Marie-François Tardy de Montravel (1811–1864), French admiral, explorer, and colonial administrator
- Richard Tardy (born 1950), a French football manager
