= Van Tard =

Spanish rock band

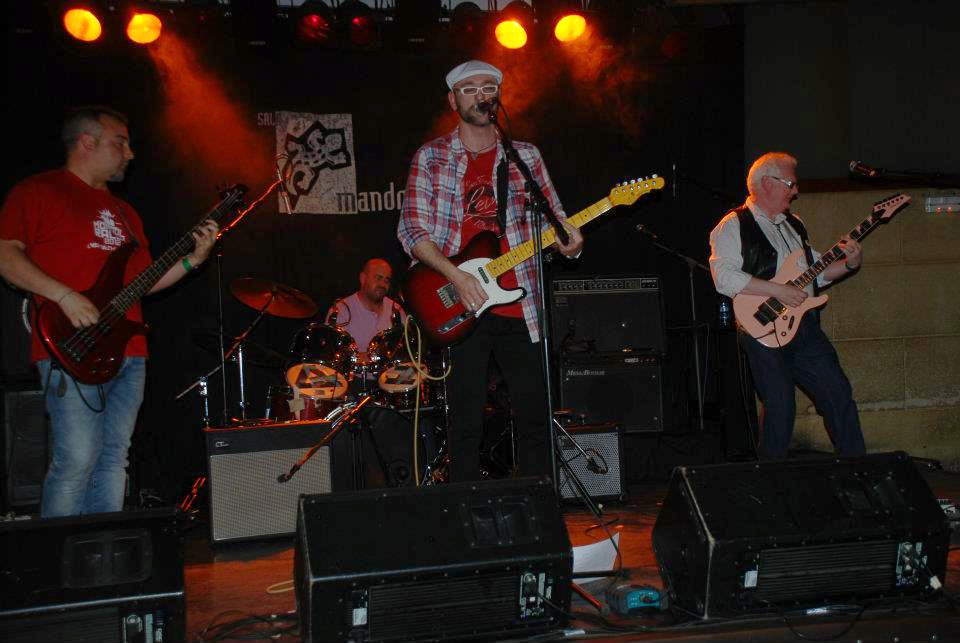
- Van Tard in "Sala Salamandra" concerthall in 2012.

Background information
- Origin: Barcelona, Spain
- Genres: Rock
- Years active: 2008–present
- Labels: JosMir Estudios (2008-actualidad)
- Members: Raul: Vocals and guitar; Chema: Drummer; Jorge: Bass guitar; José: guitar and Backing vocals
- Past members: Jesús Salvador; José Carlos Ocaña
- Website: VanTard Rock

Van Tard are a Spanish rock band formed in Barcelona in Spring 2008, offering a fresh and contemporary rock. They were rewarded with funding by the Iniciativas Culturales ONCE in 2011, with whom they released their first work El motor de tus dias.

== Band members ==
- Raúl Aguado : vocals and guitar
- Chema Sánchez-Gómez: drummer
- Jorge del Corral: bass guitar
- José Manuel Jimenez: guitar and backing vocals

== History ==
Van Tard are a Spanish rock band formed in Barcelona in Spring 2008. It has influences from bands like Platero y tu, Extremoduro, La Fuga, Heroes del Silencio, Barricada, Nirvana, Los Suaves or Fito & Fitipaldis.

Van Tard was born in the Spring of 2008 after a fortuitous meeting between Raúl (guitar and vocals) and Jorge (electric bass), both with the intention of sharing musical interests.

Soon after, they received the help of nearby friends to complete the band, which was changing rapidly with comings and goings of components.

The introduction of José Carlos Ocaña (as guitar and vocals) and Jesús Salvador seemed to indicate that the band was completed, but work and family obligations led Jesús to leave the formation; this resulted in the incorporation of Chema Sanchez-Gomez into the band (as drums). At that time, Raúl had already composed some of his own songs, such as Empieza a correr, Quisiera ser, and Olvide.

In Autumn 2010, there were some small concerts with José Carlos Ocaña, and then later with his departure Raúl as vocals. Van Tard were a trio, at this time.

In the course of 2011, thanks to a grant from the ONCE cultural contest, they recorded their first album, with 10 original songs under the title of El motor de tus dias (Josmir Estudios).

While recording the album, know José Manuel Jiménez (lead guitar), in addition to producing and playing on some songs, did not hesitate to volunteer as a guitarist stable and return to complete the circle of the band.

With this ultimate format, they presented his album to the public in a charity event, Benefit Concert for ONG Action for Child Development, in famous concert hall "Salamandra" in L’Hospitalet (Barcelona). Since then and until today have been walking their work by various halls.

Now they are recording his second CD.

== Discography ==
- El motor de tus dias, CD, (2011), JosMir Estudios.
