= Duo Kie =

Spanish rap group

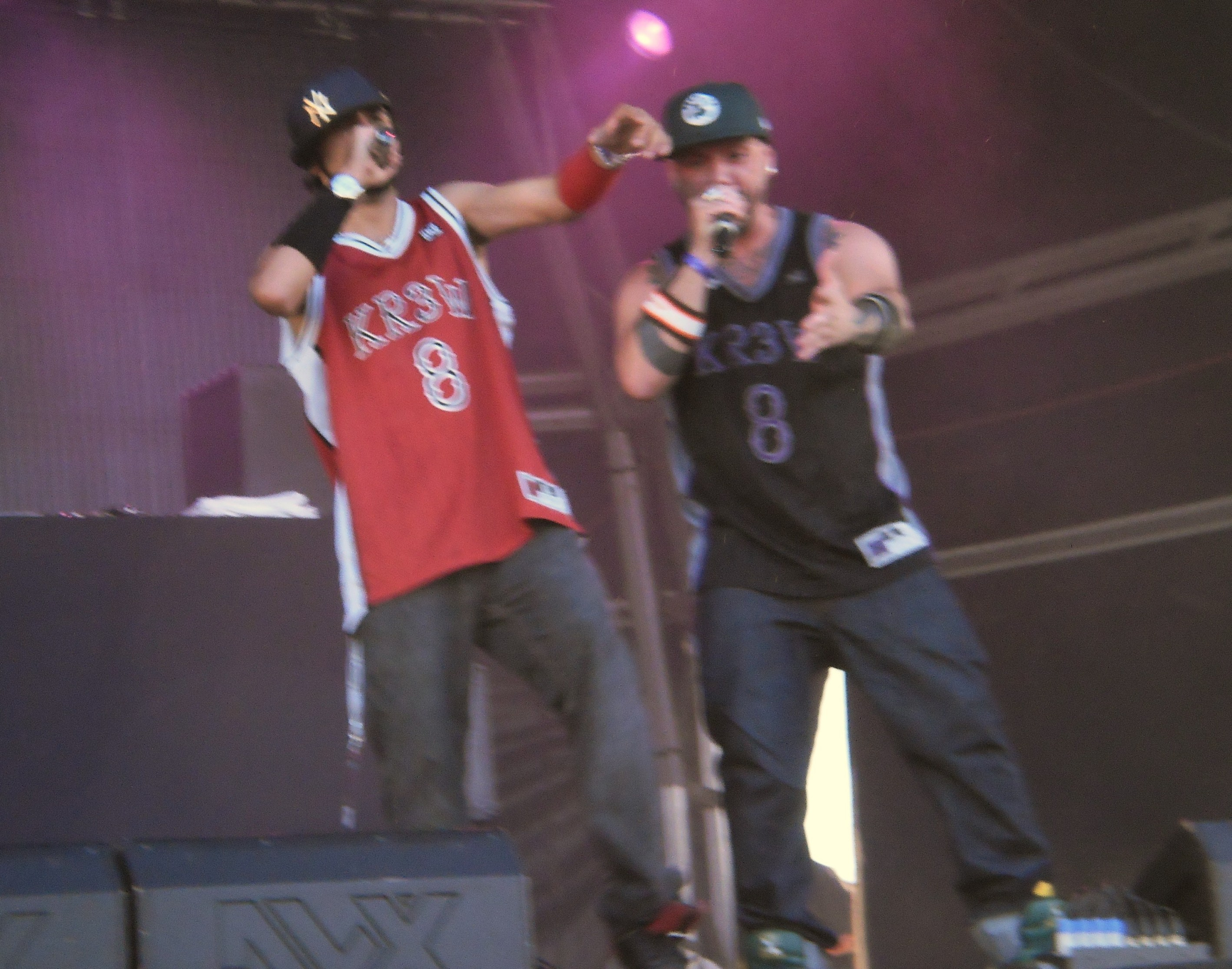

Duo Kie is a Spanish rap group from Madrid, formed by Javier Díaz (Locus) and Eduardo Sánchez (Nerviozzo). They hosted the TV show MTV Tunning España. Óscar Juárez (DJ Time) was also a member of the group from 2002 to 2006.

== Discography ==
=== Solo releases ===
Nerviozzo was the first to release a demo, in 1995, with "3 0‘ Jazz". One year later, in 1996, he released a number of demos, including "Otanisessah". In 1998 Locus released his first LP, "Un día más en la vida de un don nadie", under his previous artistic name "Locus Amenus".

=== Group releases ===
Nerviozzo and Locus released the maxi "2000 y pico", in 1999. The maxi was released with the name "Nerviozzo + Locus Amenus". The first LP that they released was "La famosa 12/13" in 2000, also under the name "Nerviozzo + Locus Amenus". Their second LP, "Non freno" was released under the name of "Duo kie". The third disc, "Barroco" was released in 2004. The 26 March 2008 the group released their fourth LP "21 Centímetros". They filmed video clips of "Nosotros lo hicimos" and "Yeah", which were produced by Bajocero.

On 19 December 2009 they released a mix-tape in their concerts called "Tremenda Vendetta," which contains their songs with the most important collaborations.

The 5 April 2011 they realised their new CD "De cerebri mortis". This disc contains songs like "Quien se apunta". The 26 May a short film "Bendita masacre", inspired in the video clip of "Quien se apunta" was released. It was directed by Jota Aronak and produced by Bajo Cero .

They are currently working in their new LP, due for release at the end 2012.
