= Amarok (band) =

Spanish progressive rock band

Amarok, named after the Eskimo word for 'wolf', are a Spanish progressive rock band, with mediterranean and Middle Ages musical influences. The group was founded in 1990 by Robert Santamaría and Lídia Cerón.

The band address environmental issues, and much of their material is recorded using solar powered equipment.

== Discography ==
- Els nostres petits amics (recorded in a home studio using solar powered equipment)
- Canciones de los mundos perdidos (1995, Lyricon)
- Gibra'ara (1998, Beringia)
- Tierra de especias (2000, recorded using only solar energy)
- Mujer Luna (2002)
- Quentadharkën (2004, Tecnosaga)
- Sol De Medianoche (2007)
- Gouveia 2005 (2011)
- Hayat Yolunda (Path Of Life) (2015)
- El Ojo Del Mundo (2021)
- Canciones Para Un Planeta Herido (2024)
