= Sôber =

Spanish alternative rock band

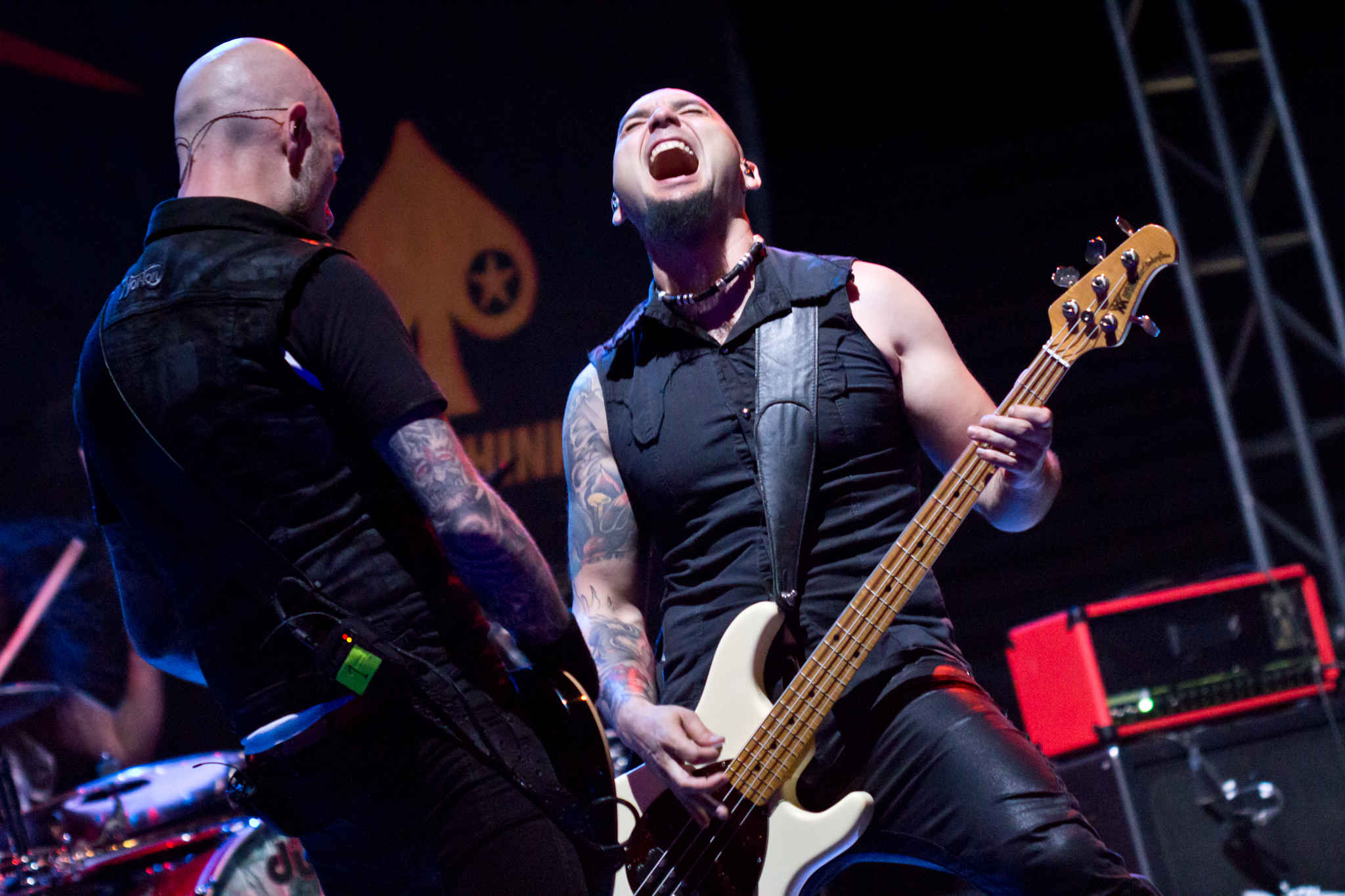
- Sôber at Asaco Metal Fest 2013.

Background information
- Origin: Madrid, Spain
- Genres: Alternative rock Alternative metal
- Years active: 1994–2005; 2010–present
- Labels: Sober Records; Zero Records; Muxxic (Gran Via Musical); Universal Music Spain
- Spinoffs: Savia (band), Skizoo
- Members: Carlos Escobedo; Jorge Escobedo; Antonio Bernardini; Manu Reyes
- Past members: Elías Romero; Luis Miguel Planelló; Alberto Madrid (deceased)
- Website: www.soberband.com

Sôber is an alternative rock band from Madrid, Spain, formed in 1994. Founded when Carlos Escobedo posted an advertisement in a local guitar store and was then contacted by Antonio Bernardini to start Sober Stoned. The band's line-up has primarily consisted of vocalist/bassist Carlos Escobedo, guitarists Jorge Escobedo and Antonio Bernardini, while going through a number of drummers. In 2002, with Alberto Madrid as drummer, the band released Paradÿsso. The album sold more than 100,000 copies. In 2004 they released Reddo, which sold more than 50,000 copies.

On 1 January 2010, the band announced their reunion with Manu Reyes as drummer.

== History ==
=== Early years ===
Sôber is a band from Madrid, Spain, formed in 1994. Founded when Carlos Escobedo posted an advertisement in a local guitar store and was then contacted by Antonio Bernardini to start Sober Stoned. The band's first line-up consisted of the Escobedo brothers, Carlos and Jorge, vocals/bass and guitar, respectively. Antonio Bernardini, also guitar, and Elías Romero as the drummer. Since then the band has had a couple of drummer changes. Sôber takes its name from the literal meaning of sober, and from the song "Sober" by the band Tool, from their first album, Undertow

=== Torcidos ===
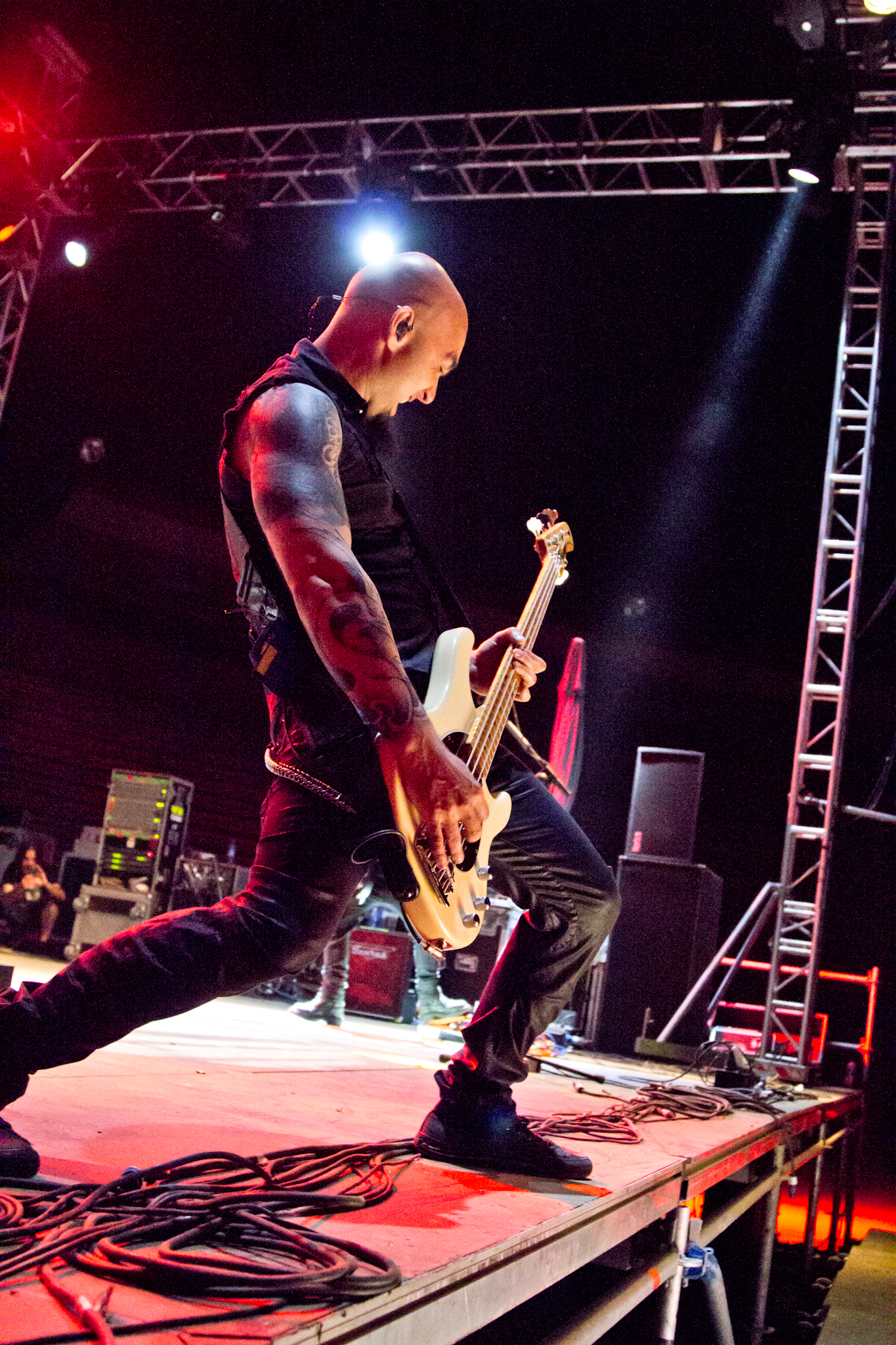
Carlos Escobedo in 2013

They began singing in English and in 1994 they recorded their first demo, titled Mirror’s Way, which included 5 songs. Shortly after, the band signed with their first label. The label forced them to switch from English to Spanish in the process. In 1995, ready to release their first studio album, Torcidos, the record company went bankrupt. Later in 1997, under their own label, Sober Records, they finally released Torcidos.

=== Morfología ===
The band continued working on new songs, and one of them, "La Prisión del Placer", was included in a compilation for the magazine Heavy Rock. The band started to get many calls and letters and they decided to start recording again. They ended up in Rocksoul Studios, with production done by themselves and Alberto Seara. They recorded 3 songs and send the samples to many record companies. Zero Records signed them in 1998. The band changed its name from Sober Stoned to Sôber and Luis Miguel Planelló replaced Elías Romero as drummer. Towards the end of September, they released an EP titled Condenado. In 1999, they released their second studio album, Morfología, which included songs like "Abstinencia", "Loco", "Predicador" and "La Prisión del Placer". After the recording of the album, Alberto Madrid replaced Luis Miguel Planelló as drummer.

=== Synthesis ===
In the year 2000 they released the EP Oxígeno (Ô₂), which contained songs that would later be included in their third studio album, titled Synthesis. It was produced by Oscar Clavel and recorded at Kirios and Eurosonic studios. Some of the songs include "Versus (Vs.)", "Si Me Marcho" and "Vacío". Synthesis is one of the best Pop rock albums of Spain and sold more than 30,000 copies. Shortly after, the band left Zero Records and signed with Muxxic (Gran Vía Musical).

=== Paradÿsso ===
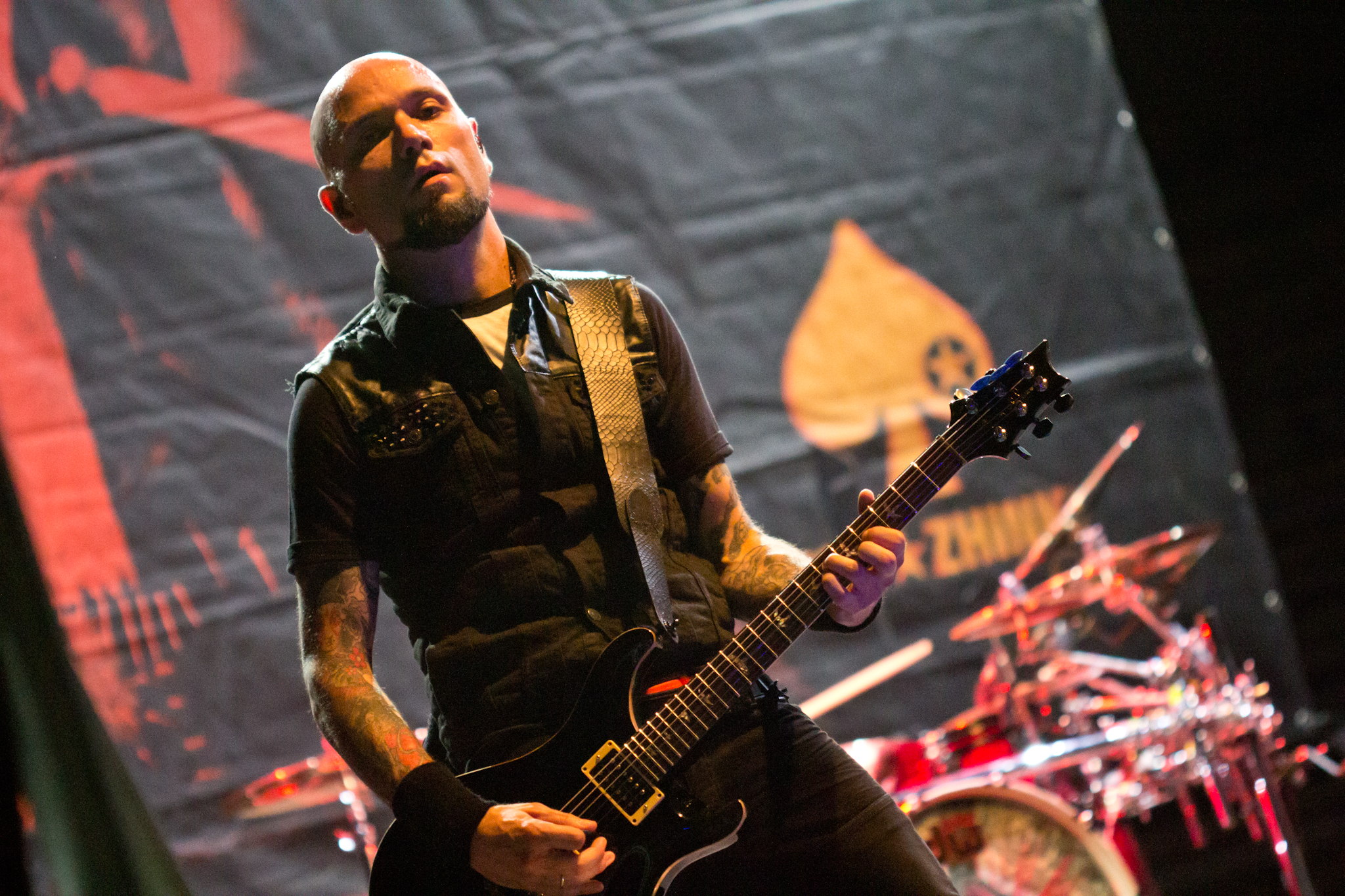
Antonio Bernardini live in 2013.

Sôber began to become known among the rock scene and played alongside bands like Deftones, HIM, and Dover. They became the revelation group after their performance in a well-known rock festival, Festimad. In 2002, after an intense tour, they released their fourth studio album, Paradÿsso. Songs like "Diez Años" and "Paradysso" rapidly become hit songs in Spain. The album was recorded in Cube Studios by Alberto Seara and was self-produced entirely by the band, giving them the opportunity to develop their own personal ideas. The album has been the band's best, and was certified Gold and Platinum for selling more than 100,000 copies. They set off on a 2-year tour performing over 100 concerts.

=== Reddo ===
After releasing Backstage 02/03, which included 3 songs from their concert in Salamanca in 2003, the band released their fifth studio album, Reddo, which translates into "reflection" in Latin. It was again recorded and self-produced by the band in Cube Studios. It was mixed in Los Angeles by Scott Humphrey, who has worked with artists and bands like Bon Jovi and Metallica, among many others. The album went on sale in February 2004. The lyrics and the majority of the songs were composed by vocalist and bassist, Carlos Escobedo.

=== Separation in 2005 ===
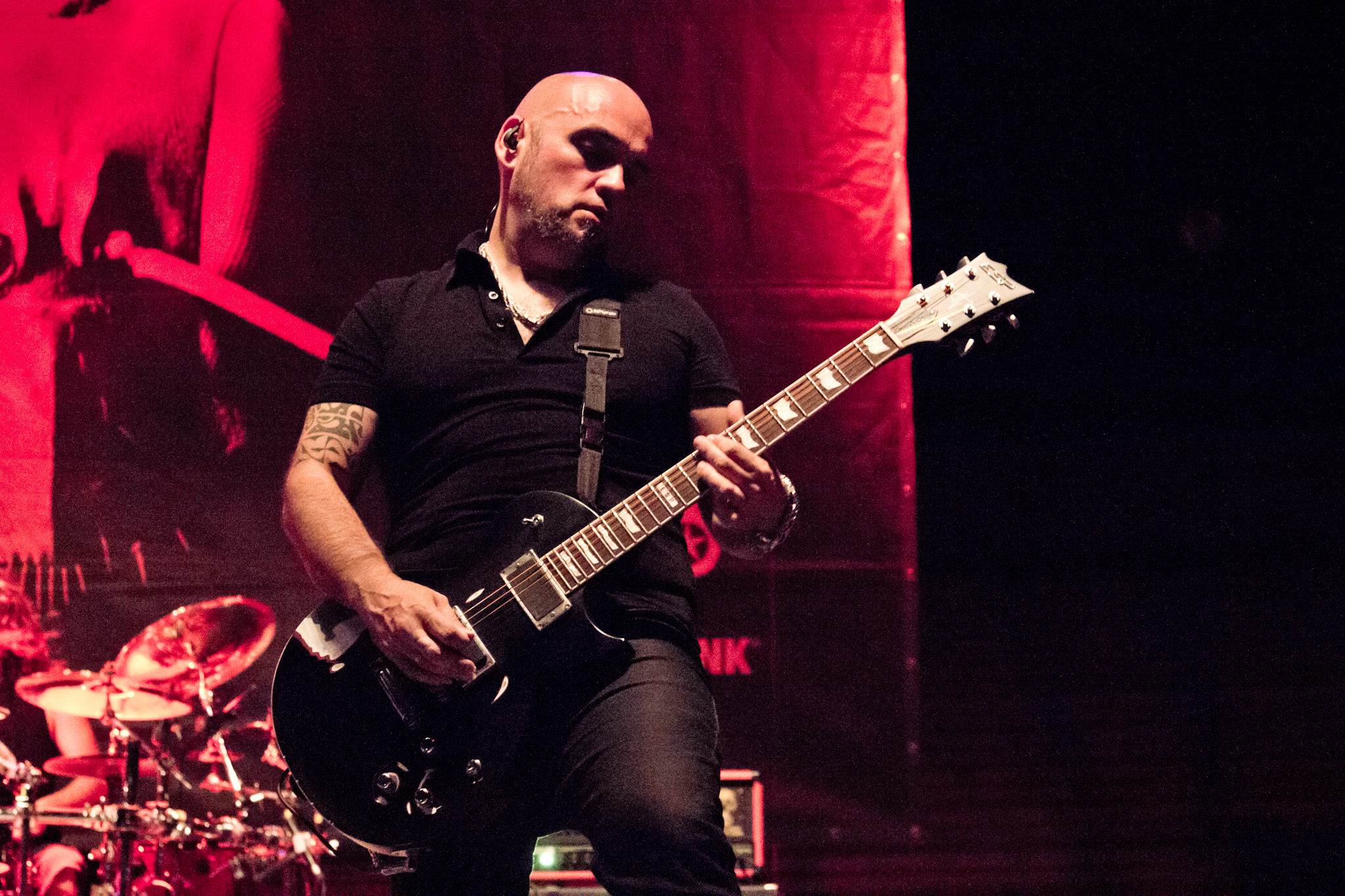
Jorge Escobedo during Asaco Metal Fest 2013.

After more than ten years of working together, the band decided to separate for some time and take on other projects, with two new groups: Savia, (Carlos Escobedo's project with the collaboration of Alberto Madrid) and Skizoo (formed by Sôber's two guitarists, Antonio Bernandini and Jorge Escobedo). On 31 October 2005, Universal released a compilation of their greatest hits, titled Grandes Éxitos 1994–2004.

=== Death of Alberto Madrid ===
On 30 November 2006, Alberto Madrid was involved in a fatal traffic accident along the M-40 road in Madrid, Spain.

=== Return in 2010 ===
After almost six years working on side projects, on 1 January 2010, the band officially announced on their website their return and the addition of Manu Reyes as drummer. The band also confirmed a tour in Spain, Mexico, Venezuela, Costa Rica, Argentina, and Chile.

== Band members ==
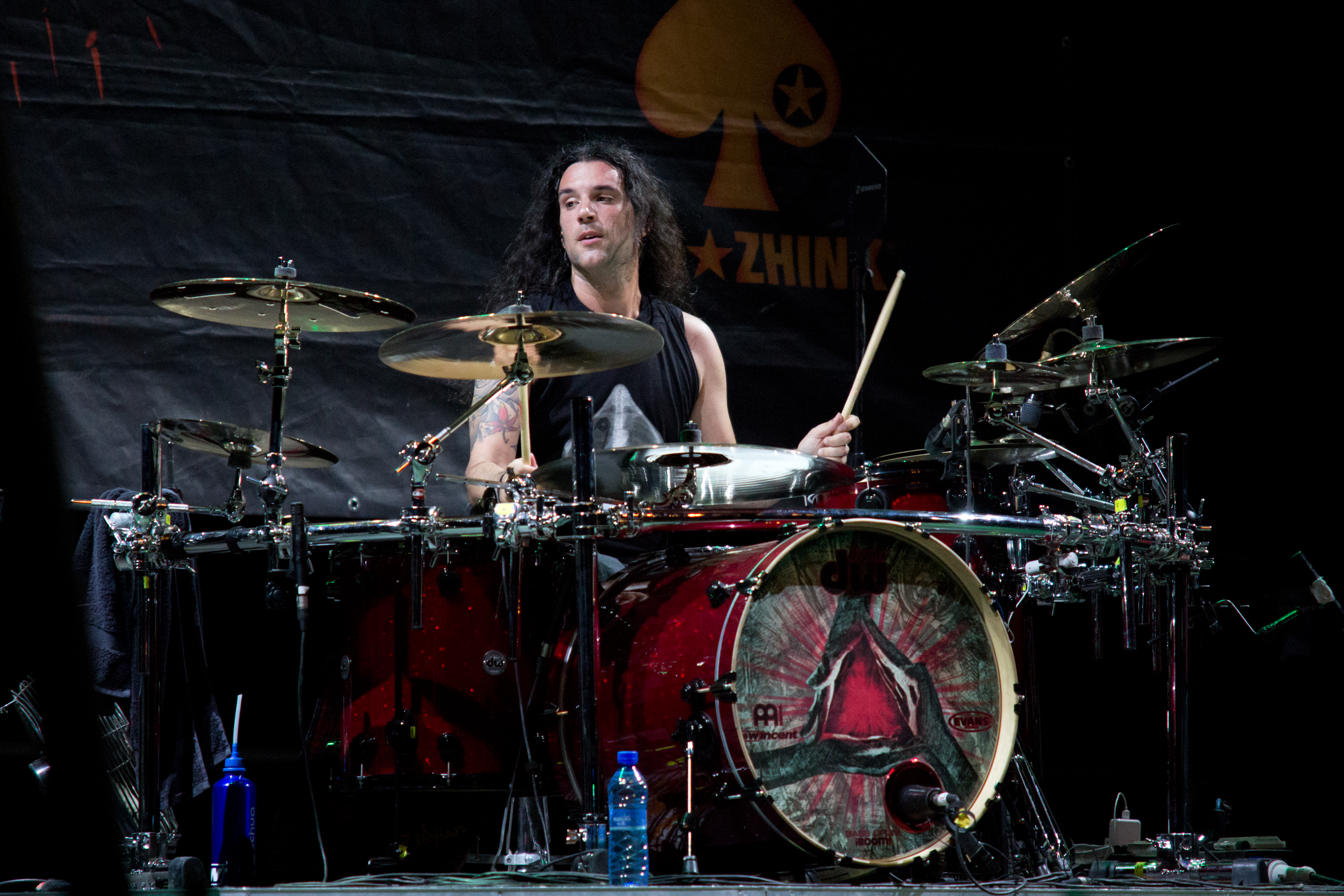
Manu Reyes at the drums

- Carlos Escobedo – Vocals / Bass
- Jorge Escobedo – Guitar
- Antonio Bernardini – Guitar
- Manu Reyes – Drums

=== Former members ===
- Elías Romero -Drums (1994–1998)
- Luis Miguel Planelló – Drums (1998–1999)
- Alberto Madrid (deceased) – Drums (1999–2005)

== Discography ==
=== Albums ===
Year	Album	Label
1997	Torcidos (Twisted)	Sober Records
1999	Morfología (Morphology)	Zero Records
2001	Synthesis	Zero Records
2002	Paradÿsso	Muxxic (Gran Via Musical)
2003	Backstage 02/03	Muxxic (Gran Via Musical)
2004	Reddo	Muxxic (Gran Via Musical)
2005	Grandes Éxitos 1994–2004 (Greatest Hits 1994–2004)	Universal Music Spain
2010	De aquí a la eternidad (From Here to Eternity)	Universal Music Spain
2011	Superbia	Last Tour Records
2014	Letargo (Lethargic)	Warner Music Spain
2016	Vulcano	Warner Music Spain
2018	La sinfonía del Paradÿsso (Symphony of Paradÿsso)	El Dromedario Records
2021	ELEGÍA (Elegy)	El Dromedario Records
2024	Retorcidos	El Dromedario Records

=== Singles / videos ===
Year	Song	Album
1999	Loco (Mad)	Morfología
2001	Versus (Vs.)	Synthesis
2001	Vacío (Empty)	Synthesis
2002	Diez años (Ten Years)	Paradÿsso
2002	Eternidad (Eternity)	Paradÿsso
2003	Arrepentido (Regretful)	Paradÿsso
2003	Paradÿsso	Paradÿsso
2004	La nube (The Cloud)	Reddo
2004	Cientos de preguntas (Hundreds of Questions)	Reddo
2004	El hombre de hielo (The Ice Man)	Reddo
2010	Sombras (Shadows)	De aquí a la eternidad
2011	Tic-Tac (Tick Tock)	Superbia
2011	Náufrago (Castaway)	Superbia
2012	La araña (The Spider)	Superbia
2013	Una vida por exprimir (One Life to Express)	Promotional single
2014	Blancanieve (Snow White)	Letargo
2014	Encadenado (Chained)	Letargo

== Appearance in movies and video games ==
- The songs "Versus (Vs.)" and "Esfera", from the album "Synthesis", are part of the soundtrack for the Spanish film "School Killer" (2001).
- The song "Paradÿsso", from the album of the same name, is part of the soundtrack for the Spanish film "Cosa de brujas" (2003).
- The song "Cientos de preguntas", from the album "Reddo", is part of the soundtrack for the FIFA 2005 video game.
