= Los Suaves =

Spanish hard rock band

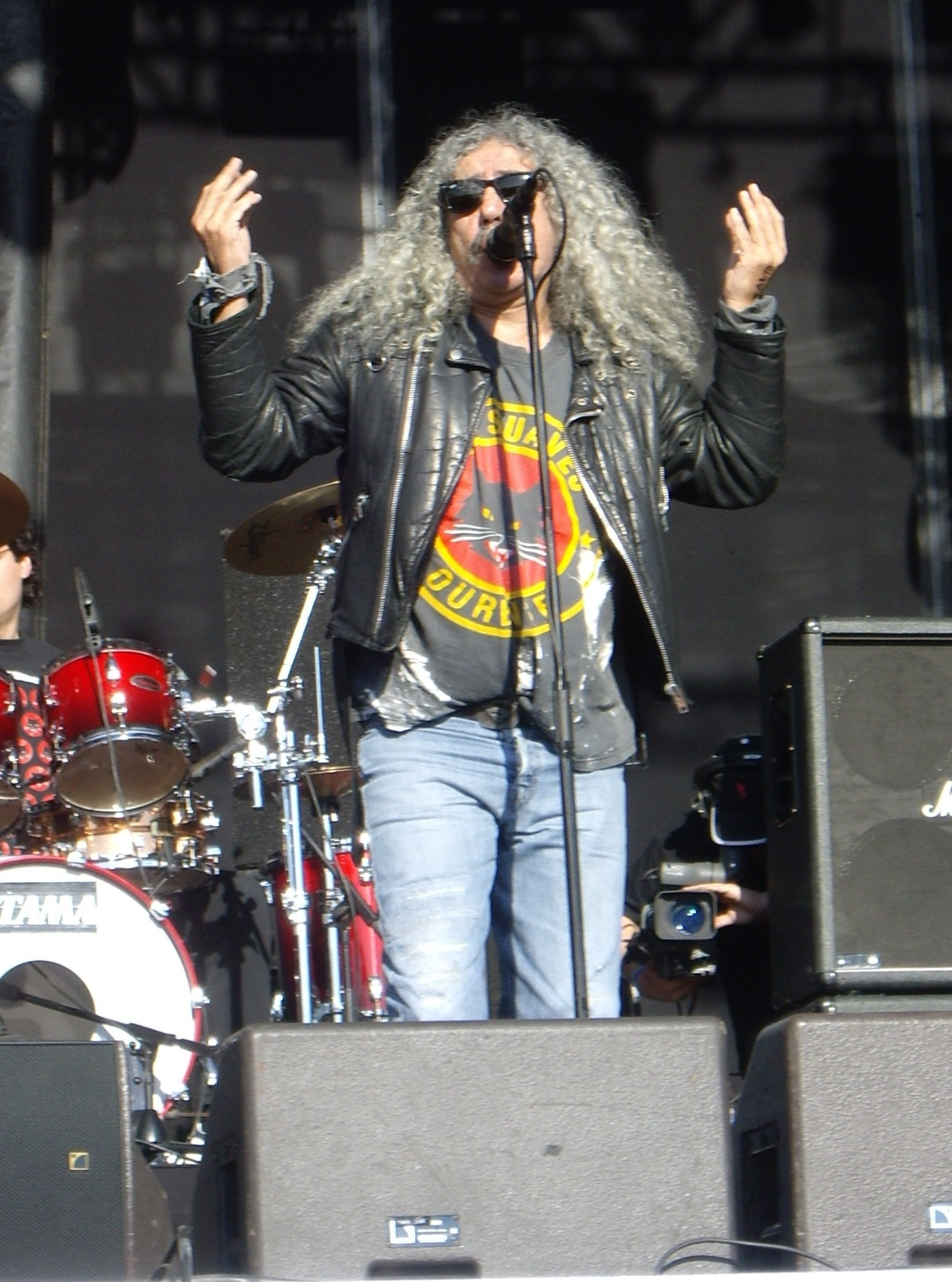
- Yosi, the band leader, at Viñarock 2009

Background information
- Origin: Ourense, Spain
- Genres: Rock; hard rock; heavy metal
- Years active: 1980–present
- Label: Locomotive Music
- Members: Yosi Domínguez; Alberto Cereijo; Fernando Calvo; Charly Domínguez; Tino

Los Suaves is a Spanish hard rock band from Ourense, Galicia, Spain. The band was founded in the 1980s by the Domínguez brothers: Charly, bassist, and Yosi Domínguez, vocalist.

The chance to record their first album, Esta vida me va a matar (This Life is going to kill me), appeared after being the support band of the Ramones in A Coruña, during one of the visits of this punk band to Europe. With this album important songs like "Peligrosa María" or "Viene el tren" were published. After eight years passed going unnoticed they achieved a real success with their third album Ese día piensa en mí (1989). This point marked the beginning of their most successful stage.

The band has received the "Medalla de Oro de Galicia" (Gold Medal of Galicia) award in the year 2016 from Xunta de Galicia. The band also has its name in a square in the city of Ourense, named in 2003 as "Plaza dos Suaves".

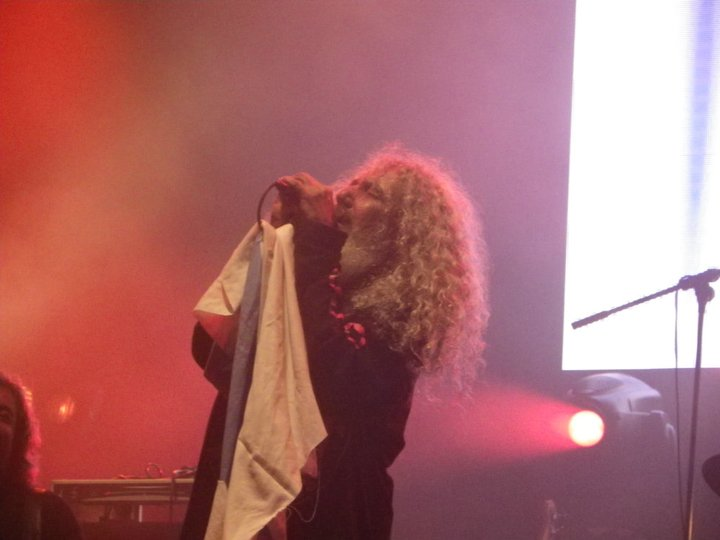
Yosi singing at Riazor beach in 2011

== Discography ==
- Esta vida me va a matar (1982)
- Frankenstein (1984)
- Ese día piensa en mi (1989)
- Maldita sea mi suerte (1989)
- Suave es la noche (live, 1990)
- 10 años de rock (compilation, 1992)
- Malas noticias (1993)
- Santa Compaña (1994)
- Especial acústico CADENA 100 (acoustic album, 1995)
- Hay alguien ahí (live, 1995)
- Lo mejor de ¿Hay alguien ahí? (1995)
- Con el corazón (compilation, 1996)
- San Francisco Express (1997)
- Víspera de todos los santos (2000)
- Un paso atrás en el tiempo (compilation, 2002)
- Si yo fuera Dios (2003)
- El jardín de las delicias (2005)
- Adiós, adiós (2010)
- Vispera de Todos Los Santos (2021)
- No puedo dejar el Rock (2021)
