= Jub Khaleh-ye Olya =

Jub Khaleh-ye Olya جوب خله عليا
- Village
- Location within Iran
- Coordinates: 30°32′25″N 51°53′38″E
- Country: Iran
- Province: Fars
- County: Sepidan
- Bakhsh: Central
- Rural District: Komehr

Population (2006)
  - Total: 120
- Time zone: UTC+3:30 (IRST)
  - Summer (DST): UTC+4:30 (IRDT)

Jub Khaleh-ye Olya (Persian: جوب خله عليا, also Romanized as Jūb Khaleh-ye 'Olyā and Jūbkhaleh-ye 'Olyā; also known as Chūy Qal‘eh, Jub Khaleh, Jūbkhāleh-ye Bālā, Jūb Khaleh-ye Bālā, Jūkheleh, and Jūy Khaleh Bālā) is a village in Komehr Rural District, in the Central District of Sepidan County, Fars province, Iran. At the 2006 census, its population was 120, in 25 families.
