= Chucho =

Chucho is a given name. Notable people with the name include:

- Chucho Avellanet (born 1941), Puerto Rican singer and comedic actor
- Christian Benítez (1986–2013), Ecuadorian footballer nicknamed 'Chucho'
- Chucho Castillo (born 1944), former Mexican boxer
- Chucho Merchán (born 1953), session jazz bassist
- Chucho Navarro, (1913–93), singer and founding member of the Trio Los Panchos
- Chucho Ramos (1918–77), outfielder/first baseman in Major League Baseball during the 1944 season
- Chucho Sanoja (1926–98), Venezuelan musician, pianist, composer, music director and arranger
- Chucho Valdés (born 1941), Cuban pianist, bandleader, composer and arranger
