= Madrid – Las Ventas =

Live album by Mägo de Oz
- Released: 2005
- Genre: Folk metal
- Label: Locomotive Music

Mägo de Oz chronology
Belfast (2004)	Madrid – Las Ventas (2005)	Gaia II: La Voz Dormida (2005)

Madrid – Las Ventas is a live album by folk metal artists Mägo de Oz, which was released in 2005.

== Track listing ==
=== Disc one ===
1. "Obertura MDXX"
2. "Van a rodar cabezas"
3. "Ancha es Castilla"
4. "Fiesta pagana"
5. "El que quiera entender que entienda"
6. "El pacto"
7. "El árbol de la noche triste"
8. "Gaia"

=== Disc two ===
1. "El peso del alma" (Spanish cover version of HammerFall's "Glory to the Brave")
2. "La rosa de los vientos"
3. "Noche toledana"
4. "Astaroth"
5. "La leyenda de la llorona"
6. "La danza del fuego"
7. "La costa del silencio"
8. "Molinos de viento"

== Concert DVD ==
The DVD has the same track listing as the CD.

A film is shown during "Obertura MDXX", with natural and historical imagery. Nick Ut's famous photograph of Kim Phuc during the Vietnam War appears.

The stage is a pirate ship with the bandmembers dressed in pirate costume. (Invited guests are not dressed as pirates.)

"Fiesta pagana" begins with fireworks, and Walter Giardino guests on guitar. Four dancers (two male, two female) arrive on stage during "El árbol de la noche triste" and strip.

José Andrëa performs "Gaia" seated, at first, in an electric chair. After the instrumental break, he returns in an orange prisoner's jumpsuit. During his final screams, he is strapped into the chair and receives the last rites from a priest. Flames erupt along the front of the stage. The corpse of José Andrëa is wheeled off.

During the grand piano introduction to "El peso del alma", Patricia Tapia (from Nexx) arrives at centre stage. There she is joined by a female string quartet, then finally José Andrëa for their duet, which they act out operatically. They embrace during the piano close.

For "La rosa de los vientos", Txus leaves his drumkit and performs at centre stage with José Andrëa and the quartet.

Jorge Salán is guest guitarist on "Noche Toledana". He continues on into "Astaroth" when a belly dancer (Isabel) arrives on the upper deck and moves about, distracting members of the band. Patricia Tapia returns for her vocal. Patricia and the belly dancer kiss. The song ends with José Andrëa and Patricia on the runway.

On "La leyenda de la llorona", Javier Cruz guests on bongos.

For "La danza del fuego", La Bruja forms a giant backdrop on the upper deck.

After a soothing violin and flute passage, fireworks go off and the band starts into "Molinos de Viento", as a giant Don Quixote inflates on the upper deck. José Andrëa allows the audience to sing the first verse. "El sueño es realidad."

The concert ends with fireworks and José Andrëa setting off the cannon along the front of the stage.

== Credits ==
- José Andrea: vocals
- Txus Di Fellatio: drums, backing vocals, vocals in "La Rosa de Los Vientos"
- Carlitos: lead guitar, backing vocals
- Frank: rhythm guitar, acoustic guitar, backing vocals
- Sergio Martínez: bass
- Mohamed: violin
- Fernando Ponce: flutes, Irish whistle, backing vocals
- Kiskilla: keyboards, synthesizers

== Invited musicians ==
- Walter Giardino: lead guitar in "Fiesta Pagana"
- Jorge Salán: lead guitar in "Noche Toledana" and "Astaroth", acoustic guitar in "La Costa del Silencio"
- Isabel: dancer in "Astaroth"
- Javier Cruz: percussions in "La Leyenda de La Llorona"
- Patricia Tapia: vocals in "El Peso del Alma" and "Astaroth"
- Las Cuartetas (Adriana, Isabel, Sara and Ana): string quartet in "El Peso del Alma" and "Astaroth"
