= No Looking Back =

No Looking Back may refer to:

== Film and TV ==
- Out of the Blue (1980 film), released in Canada as No Looking Back, directed by Dennis Hopper
- No Looking Back (1998 film), a film directed by Edward Burns
- No Looking Back (2021 film), a Russian dark comedy crime film
- No Looking Back, documentary on Jorge Salán 2014

== Music ==
- No Lookin' Back, a 1985 album by Michael McDonald
- No Looking Back (Gerard McMahon album), 1983
- No Looking Back (Clarence Gatemouth Brown album), 1992
- No Lookin' Back, a 1990 album by Yui Asaka
- No Looking Back, a 2008 album by Damita, or the title track
- No Looking Back, a 1992 album by LaVerne Butler
- No Looking Back, a 2014 album by Jorge Salán
- No Lookin' Back (song) by Michael McDonald
- "No Lookin' Back", song by Wes Mack from Edge of the Storm
- "No Looking Back", song by Leo Sayer from the 1978 album Leo Sayer
