= Rock n' Oz =

Rock 'N' Oz

Compilation album by Mägo de Oz
- Released: 2006
- Genre: Folk rock
- Label: Locomotive Music, Warner Music Group

Mägo de Oz chronology
Gaia II: La Voz Dormida (2005)	Rock 'N' Oz (2006)	La Ciudad de los Árboles (2007)

Rock 'N' Oz is the first greatest-hits compilation of the Spanish folk metal band Mägo de Oz. It also comes with a special edition entitled The Best Oz which includes an extra disc containing rare recordings as well as a DVD highlighting their American tour.

The album also has four rerecorded songs: "Molinos de viento", "Jesús de Chamberí", "El Cantar de la Luna Oscura", and "Hasta que tu muerte nos separe". The band also announced that they would be signing copies of the album throughout multiple locations in Spain.

== Controversy ==
Chilean songwriter Fernando Ubiergo claimed that the band's leader (Txus di Fellatio) recorded one of their songs without copyright permission, and credited to Txus. The band apologized and told the media it was a print-mistake.

== Tracks ==
- Disc 1
  1. Molinos de viento (Version 2006)
  2. La Costa del Silencio
  3. Fiesta Pagana
  4. La Danza del Fuego
  5. El Lago
  6. El Atrapasueños
  7. La Rosa de los Vientos
  8. El Que Quiera Entender Que Entienda
  9. Hoy Toca Ser Feliz
  10. La Posada de los Muertos
  11. Diabulus in Música
  12. Hasta Que Tu Muerte Nos Separe (Version 2006)
  13. Hasta Que el Cuerpo Aguante
  14. El Cantar de la Luna Oscura (Version 2006)
- Disc 2
  1. Jesús De Chamberí (Version 2006)
  2. Van A Rodar Cabezas
  3. El Santo Grial
  4. Satania
  5. La Leyenda De La Mancha
  6. Gaia
  7. Maritormes
  8. El Paseo De Los Tristes
  9. Astaroth
  10. Réquiem
- Disc 3 (only on The Best Oz version)
  1. Noches de Bohemia (New song)
  2. Para Ella (old recording sung by Juanma, adapted from Cuando Agosto era 21 by Fernando Ubiergo)
  3. Brisa de Otoño (old recording sung by Juanma)
  4. Por Volver a Tenerte (old recording sung by Juanma)
  5. El Tango del Donante
  6. Domingo de Gramos (old recording sung by Juanma)
  7. Jesús de Chamberí (sung in 1995 by Juanma just before the recording of the album and his firing)
  8. El Ángel Caído (demo)
  9. La Canción de Pedro (demo)
  10. Al-Mejandría (demo)
  11. Memoria da Noite (cover)
  12. Sueños Diabólicos (instrumental)
  13. La Fina
  14. Take on Me (cover)
  15. Como un Huracán (cover)
  16. Adiós Dulcinea (First released on the Txus Di Fellatio's poetry book-cd "El Cementerio de los Versos Perdidos" as an inedit track)
