= Finisterra (album) =

Studio album by Mägo de Oz
- Released: 19 May 2000
- Recorded: 2000
- Genre: Folk metal
- Length: 1:48:46
- Label: Locomotive Music

Mägo de Oz chronology
La Leyenda de la Mancha (1998)	Finisterra (2000)	Fölktergeist (2002)

Professional ratings
Review scores
Source	Rating
Allmusic	link

Finisterra is the fourth studio album by the Spanish folk metal band Mägo de Oz, which was released in 2000. It is their first double album and their second rock opera since Jesús de Chamberí. It narrates the story of Satania, a fictional society in the future where life depends on the Internet and computers.

== Plot ==
In the year 2199, a new order, Satania, is ruling the world. This was caused in the beginning of the 21st century, when the Third World, under the name of "Batallón de la Cochambre", made a revolution called "la guerra del hambre" (the war of hunger). This made the world's dominant powers to use all their bacteriological and nuclear arsenals, causing the destruction of all animal and plant life, but not destroying all humanity. A selected group of corporate leaders, politicians and computer programmers, organized by the enigmatic figure of "elmaestro.com", created Satania, a world without violence, revolutions or the right of the people to think by themselves to create another option. Years passed in a world where reading was forbidden, sex was practiced in the "clean way" (virtually), oxygen was rationed, and society was slowly falling on itself. In Necropolis, the official capital of Satania, a group of "doubters" (people who were not conformed with digital life and with an automatic society) began the search of another way of life, based more on the spiritual ways, and running away from the advances that will lead to the destruction of the Earth. Bribing the biggest hacker in the zone, "alamierda.es" (toshit.es), with oxygen credit cards and the most powerful hallucinating drug that ever existed (which is, a video of notable moments of a game show), they search in the hard drive of "elmaestro.com" (themaster.com) for the reason why humanity reached that point.

They find a CD-ROM that narrates the story of Diego Cortéz, a swordsman that protects an enigmatic pilgrim from Puente La Reina to Santiago de Compostela, known to be the pilgrimage of the Way of St. James and they both make a long voyage of self-discovery. When they finally reach Santiago de Compostela the pilgrim kills Diego, after revealing he is Astaroth (the Devil). He then goes to the nearby church. To close the agreement, the Devil leaves a CD-ROM with an inscription on it, "You are in Satania, this is the end of the road!".

== Track listing ==
=== Disc one ===
1. "Prólogo" (Prologue) - 1:59
2. "Satania" (Satania) - 8:14
3. "La Cruz de Santiago" (Santiago's Cross) - 5:19
4. "La Danza del Fuego" (The Dance of Fire) - 5:13
5. "Hasta que el cuerpo aguante" (As much as the body can stand) - 4:32
6. "El Señor de los Gramillos" (The Lord of the Grams, pun on The Lord of the Rings in Spanish) - 4:59
7. "Polla Dura no cree en Dios" ("Boner" does not believe in God, Spanish saying) - 4:30
8. "Maite Zaitut" (Basque for "I Love You") (cover of "Deu tu Ganeme" by Gwendal) - 3:20
9. "Duerme... (Canción de cuna)" (Sleep... (Lullaby)) (cover of "Scarborough Fair", popularized by Simon & Garfunkel) - 4:29
10. "Es hora de marchar" (It's Time To Go) (cover of "Rainbow Eyes" by Rainbow) - 5:03

=== Disc two ===
1. "Fiesta Pagana" (Pagan Party) - 4:56
2. "El que quiera entender, que entienda" (who wants to understand, may do so) - 7:27
3. "Los renglones torcidos de Dios" (The Twisted Lines of God) - 6:31
4. "La dama del amanecer (kelpie)" (The Lady of Dawn) (cover of "Kelpie" by Jethro Tull) - 4:50
5. "Tres Tristes Tigres" (Three Sad Tigers, the beginning of a popular Spanish tongue twister) - 2:43
6. "A Costa da Morte" (Galician for "The Coast of Death") - 3:34
7. "La Santa Compaña" ("The Holy Company") - 5:34
8. "Conxuro (da Queimada)" (Incantation) - 3:45
9. "Astaroth" - 6:31
10. "Finisterra" - 15:16

== Certifications ==
Region	Certification	Certified units/sales
Spain (Promusicae)	Platinum	100,000^{^}
^{^} Shipments figures based on certification alone.
