= Debler Eternia =

Spanish symphonic metal band

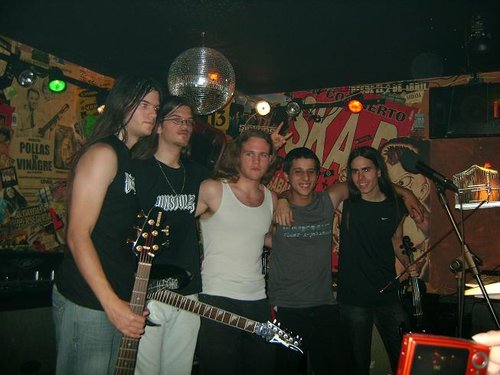
- Débler in 2009

Background information
- Origin: Coslada, Madrid, Spain
- Genres: Symphonic metal; Folk metal; Melodic power metal
- Years active: 2006–present
- Label: Duque Productions
- Members: Rubén Kelsen; Pablo Rodríguez; Abraham Roca; Javi Javat; Pablo Sabater
- Website: deblereternia.com

Debler Eternia, formerly known as Débler, is a Spanish symphonic metal band from Coslada, Madrid. The band is known for its heavy orchestral elements and albums based around famous works of film and literature. It is strongly influenced by Mägo de Oz, whose leader Txus di Fellatio was producer for Débler from 2016 to 2019, while in turn Débler's singer Rubén Kelsen became a usual replacement singer for Mägo de Oz.

== History ==
=== Early stage ===
Débler was founded in 2006 by brothers Sergio and Alex García, who gathered singer and guitar Víctor Suárez, drummer Nelson Valenzuela and keyboard and violin Dani Fuentes. They released in 2008 their first demo, Alcanzando mi destino, containing three songs. The following year they started production of a bigger work, but personal problems paralyzed the band until 2011, when they released it under the name Último deseo. They went into hiatus again until 2012, when Suárez left and was replaced by former Vestigia singer Adriän del Sol. With them they made El retrato, a concept work strongly divergent in style, inspired by Oscar Wilde's The Picture of Dorian Gray. This established the band's style.

=== First albums and success ===
In 2014, during the production of the band's first LP, inspired by 1994 film The Crow, Adriän del Sol was replaced by Rubén Kelsen by invitation of Alex García. The work also featured voice actors Txemi del Olmo and Rosa Romay. The resultant album, earned highly positive reviews from critics, winning awards to Best New Band, Best Male Singer and Best Music Video in magazine El Metal en España in 2015.

By mediation of Alberto Seara "Flor" and Carlos Escobedo from Sôber, who had lent their studio Cube to record it, the album attracted the attention of Mägo de Oz leader Txus di Fellatio, leading him to become their producer and mentor. In turn, Kelsen became a usual replacement singer for Mägo's voice Zeta. Coincidentally, before joining Débler, Kelsen had participated without success in Mägo de Oz's casting to replace their previous singer José Andrëa.

Two years later, Di Fellatio produced their next work, Somnia, inspired by Tim Burton's 2007 film Sweeney Todd: The Demon Barber of Fleet Street. The album featured collaborations by multiple Mägo de Oz members, like Di Fellatio, Zeta, Patricia Tapia, Diego Palacio and Javi Díez, as well as former Avalanch member Alberto Rionda, and former Sirenia singer Ailyn. It also featured famous voice actor Miguel Ángel Jenner. Somnia was critically praised and placed Débler 49th in the top 100 of Promusicae, being the only metal band in the list along with American band Mastodon. Débler solidified their place by becoming Mägo de Oz's opening act, and extended their range to Portugal and Mexico.

The band's third album, Adictium, was recorded again in Cube and released in 2019. It was based in J. M. Barrie's Peter Pan and co-produced again by Txus di Fellatio. It featured again members of Mägo de Oz, adding Manuel Seoane, and included a collaboration with Leo Jiménez, along with another renowned voice actor, Sergio Zamora. The album reflected novel electronic music influences. Adictium reached 12th place in the top and remained nine weeks among the best sellers in Amazon Spain.

=== Departures and Debler Eternia ===
The banda was forced into hiatus due to the COVID-19 pandemic in 2020, causing along with personal problems the departure of several members. Dani Fuentes abandoned Débler for folk metal band Lèpoka in March, being replaced by Sara Ember from Last Days of Eden, having her introduction in the music video of single "Nunca jamás". In October, Ember and the García brothers abandoned Débler in a process in which disbanding was considered. In June, the brothers stated they left due to a legal conflict, revealing their original intention for Di Fellatio to produce the album again were frustrated by other members' solo projects.

In May 2022, Kelsen and Valenzuela announced Débler's return and the change of name to Debler Eternia, introducing new members Dani Arcos, Pablo Sabater and Abraham Roca. In October, Debler Eternia released its first album under the new name, Perversso, based on 1996 film From Dusk till Dawn, Kelsen described the disc's style as discoteca metal ("club metal"). It featured Diego Palacio from Mägo de Oz along with Carlos Escobedo and Leo Jiménez.

In 2023, Dani Arcos left the band due to personal affairs, being replaced by Javi Javat from Celtian, although Arcos had a brief return the following year substituting an injured Javat. Valenzuela also left Debler Eternia in January 2024, replaced by Pablo Rodríguez.

== Musical style and influences ==
Debler produces a highly distinctive style of symphonic metal, with power metal and folk metal influences. Their international influences include Nightwish, Amaranthe and Helloween, while their domestic influences are most notably Mägo de Oz (specifically during the era of their 2003 album Gaia), also encompassing bands such as Saratoga, Stravaganzza, Avalanch, WarCry, Saurom and Sôber. Their albums are typically conceptual works, designed to convey emotions and tell a story, an approach also inspired by Mägo de Oz. Film scores by Hans Zimmer and John Williams serve as an additional source of influence for the band.

== Band members ==
- Rubén Kelsen: vocals (2014–present)
- Pablo Rodríguez: drums (2024–present)
- Abraham Roca: bass (2022–present)
- Javi Javat: guitar (2023–present)
- Pablo Sabater: violin (2022–present)

== Discography ==
=== Studio albums ===
- 2015: Noctem diaboli
- 2017: Somnia
- 2019: Adictium
- 2022: Perversso
- 2025: Lacrimosa

=== EPs ===
- 2008: Alcanzando mi destino
- 2011: Último deseo
- 2013: El retrato
