= Mägo de Oz (La Bruja) =

EP by Mägo de Oz
- Released: 1997
- Genre: Folk metal
- Length: 25:59
- Label: Locomotive Music

Mägo de Oz chronology
| Jesús de Chamberí (1996) | Mägo de Oz (La Bruja) (1997) | La Leyenda de la Mancha (1998) |

Mägo de Oz (La Bruja), also known as Mägo de Oz: La Bruja or simply La Bruja, is an extended play by Spanish folk metal band Mägo de Oz, which was released in 1997.

It includes five tracks from their self-titled debut album, redone with the current band members. The title is not actually La Bruja - it is self-titled - but that is the name it acquired due to the witch (bruja in Spanish) on the cover. The album is currently labelled La Bruja on the band's official website.

== Track listing ==
1. "El Lago" (The Lake) - 4:25
2. "T'esnucaré contra'l Bidé" (I Will Break Your Spine Against the Bidet) - 4:19
3. "El Hijo del Blues" (The Son of the Blues) - 4:45
4. "Gerdundula" - 1:48 [cover of Status Quo]
5. "Mägo de Oz" (Wizard of Oz) - 10:43
