= Fölktergeist =

Live album by Mägo de Oz
- Released: 2002
- Genre: Folk metal
- Label: Locomotive Music

Mägo de Oz chronology
Finisterra (2000)	Fölktergeist (2002)	Gaia (2003)

Fölktergeist is a live album by Mägo de Oz, which was released in 2002.

== Track listing ==
=== Disc one ===
1. "Satania"
2. "Maritornes"
3. "El que quiera entender que entienda"
4. "El Santo Grial"
5. "El Lago"
6. "Hasta que el cuerpo aguante"
7. "El Cantar de la Luna Oscura"
8. "La Leyenda de La Mancha"
9. "Pensando en tí" (Cover of "Dust in the Wind" by Kansas)

=== Disc two ===
1. "Jesús de Chamberí"
2. "El pacto"
3. "Réquiem"
4. "La santa compaña"
5. "Astaroth"
6. "La danza del fuego"
7. "Fiesta pagana"
8. "Hasta que tu muerte nos separe"
9. "Molinos de viento"

== Certifications ==
Region	Certification	Certified units/sales
Spain (PROMUSICAE)	Gold	50,000^{^}
^{^} Shipments figures based on certification alone.
