= Stepa =

Stepa is a given name.

Stepa may refer to:

== Persons ==
- Dariusz "Stepa" Stepnowski, former member of Polish punk band Dezerter, known as Stepa
- Stepa Stepanović (1856–1929), vojvoda of the Serbian Army
- Tatiana Stepa (1963–2009), Romanian folk singer
- Stepa Zivkovic (2002) Italian author
- Joni Stenberg (1987–), artist name Stepa, Finnish rapper

== Places ==
- Vojvoda Stepa, village in Serbia

== Music ==
- Stepa (band), American nu metal band
- Stepa, Finnish rap artist

== See also ==
- Stepas Butautas (1925–2001), Lithuanian basketball player who competed for the Soviet Union in the 1952 Summer Olympics
- Steppe, Ecoregion of plain grasslands without trees
