= I Will Be Your Friend =

"I Will Be Your Friend" may refer to:

- "I Will Be Your Friend", song by Sade from Diamond Life 1984
- "I Will Be Your Friend", song by Clarence Gatemouth Brown from No Looking Back 1992
- "I Will Be Your Friend", song by Amy Grant from Behind the Eyes 1997
- "I Will Be Your Friend", song by Michael W. Smith from This Is Your Time 1999
