= Gaia III: Atlantia =

Studio album by Mägo de Oz
- Released: 6 April 2010
- Recorded: 2009–2010
- Genre: Folk metal
- Length: 94:46
- Label: Atlantic
- Producer: Alberto Seara

Mägo de Oz chronology
La Ciudad de los Árboles (2007)	Gaia III: Atlantia (2010)	Hechizos, pócimas y brujería

Gaia III: Atlantia is the tenth album by the folk metal band Mägo de Oz. It was the third installment of the trilogy "Gaia" that began in 2003 with Gaia and continued in 2005 with Gaia II: La Voz Dormida. It was released worldwide on 6 April 2010.

On Saturday, 27 February 2010, there was a showcase exclusively for Mägo's latest album, Gaia III: Atlantia, and the accompanying video, "Que el Viento Sople a Tu Favor". The release of "Que el Viento Sople a Tu Favor" was planned for March 30.

== Gaia box set ==
According to an interview given by bandleader Txus to Mariskal Rock on the web, the entire trilogy will be sold in a deluxe package titled simply Gaia that will contain the three albums (Gaia, Gaia II: La Voz Dormida and Gaia III: Atlantia), plus 8 bonus tracks that could not be included in the 3 discs (2 left off Gaia to avoid a double disc set, 3 from Gaia II: La Voz Dormida because BigSimon said it was too much, and 3 for Gaia III: Atlantia due to lack of time).

== Anticipated 2010 tour ==
The name of the tour will be "Agaiate Que Vienen Curvas Tour 2010" and will focus only on Gaia III: Atlantia. For next year, he foresees a new tour focused on the entire trilogy. Furthermore, according to Txus's statement, after Gaia III: Atlantia, the band will take a break from work. Similarly to Txus, he noted that this does not mean that the group will break up or anything like that. Only Gaia III: Atlantia is the closure of a long period of the band, so a break will be given indefinitely. Maybe they will return with an album much easier and simpler than the Gaia trilogy. In addition, it may not follow the line of a concept album or novel. The band will try some rawer songs, without following the pattern of a story.

== Track list ==
CD 1:

1. El Latido de Gaia (Intro) "The Heartbeat of Gaia" - 4:09
2. Dies Irae "Day of Wrath (In Latin)" - 9:26
3. Für Immer ("Forever", or "For Always", in German) - 4:42
4. Vodka'n'Roll - 3:36
5. El Príncipe de la Dulce Pena (Parte IV) "The prince of sweet sorrow (Part IV)" - 4:23
6. Mi Hogar Eres Tú "You're My Home" - 6:03
7. Fuerza y Honor: El Dorado (Instrumental) "Strength and honor: el dorado (Instrumental) - 4:48
8. El Violín del Diablo "The Devil's Violin" - 4:55
9. Siempre (Adiós Dulcinea - Parte II) "Always (Goodbye Dulcinea part II) - 4:45

CD 2:

1. Mis Demonios (Atrévete a Vivir) "My demons (dare to live)" - 4:15
2. Que el Viento Sople a tu Favor "Good Riddance" - 4:16
3. Sueños Dormidos "Sleeping Dreams" - 5:17
4. Aún Amanece Gratis "It still dawns for free" - 4:53
5. La Soga del Muerto (Ayahuasca) "The rope of the dead man (Ayahuasca)" - 3:15
6. La Ira de Gaia "The Wrath Of Gaia" - 6:47
7. Atlantia - 19:16
