= Gaia II =

Gaia II may refer to

- Gaia II (Valensia album) a 2000 album by Dutch musician Valensia
- Gaia II: La Voz Dormida a 2005 album by Spanish folk metal group Mägo de Oz'
