= Hechizos, pócimas y brujería =

Studio album by Mägo de Oz
- Released: November 27, 2012
- Recorded: Summer 2012
- Genre: Folk metal
- Length: 63:22
- Label: Warner Music Spain
- Producer: Alberto Seara

Mägo de Oz chronology
Gaia III: Atlantia (2010)	Hechizos, pócimas y brujería (2012)	Ilussia (2014)

"Hechizos, pócimas y brujería" (lit: Spells, potions and witchcraft) is the twelfth album by the Spanish folk metal band Mägo de Oz. After the controversial retirement of their last vocalist José Andrëa, this is the first album of Zeta as the band's vocalist.

== Track list ==
No.	Title	Length
1.	"El libro de las sombras (The Book of Shadows)"	5:30
2.	"H2OZ"	3:53
3.	"Xanandra"	4:22
4.	"Sácale brillo a una pena (Shine a Sorrow)"	4:11
5.	"Satanael"	5:39
6.	"No pares" (de oír Rock & Roll (Don't stop (listening to Rock & Roll))	5:49
7.	"A marcha das meigas (The Witches' March)"	1:41
8.	"Quiero morirme en ti (I want to die in you)"	4:18
9.	"Sigue la luz (Follow the Light)"	5:18
10.	"El mercado de las brujas (The Witches' Market)"	4:23
11.	"Celtian"	4:10
12.	"Brujas (Witches)"	5:34
13.	"Hechizos, pócimas y brujería (Spells, potions and witchcraft)"	8:22

== Bonus tracks ==
These tracks were available only in iTunes

No.	Title	Length
14.	"Piratas*"	3:39
15.	"Desde mi cielo*" (orquestal)	2:44
16.	"Obertura Xanandra*"	3:39

== Personnel ==
- Txus Di Fellatio – drums
- Zeta – lead vocal
- Patricia Tapia – vocals in "Brujas" and chorus
- Carlos Prieto "Mohammed" – violin
- Frank – rhythm guitar
- Carlitos – lead guitar
- Javi Diez – keyboards
- Fernando Mainer – bass
- Josema – flutes
