= La Ciudad de los Árboles =

Studio album by Mägo de Oz
- Released: 6 November 2007
- Recorded: May–September 2007
- Genre: Folk metal
- Label: Warner Dro Atlantic
- Producer: Alberto Seara

Mägo de Oz chronology
Rock N' Oz (2006)	La Ciudad de los Árboles (2007)	Gaia III: Atlantia (2010)

Professional ratings
Review scores
Source	Rating
Allmusic	link

La Ciudad de los Árboles (The City of the Trees) is the eighth studio album by Spanish folk metal group Mägo de Oz, it was released on 6 November 2007. It comes in Digibook format and includes a DVD.

The first single of the album is "Y Ahora Voy a Salir (Ranxeira)", a tribute to Mexico in ranchera style.

The second single of the album is "Deja de Llorar (Y Vuélvete a Levantar)"

== Tracks ==
1. El Espíritu del Bosque (Intro) (The Spirit Of The Forest) - 1:46
2. La Ciudad de los Árboles (The City Of the Trees) - 6:02
3. Mi Nombre es Rock & Roll (My Name Is Rock & Roll) - 6:03
4. El Rincón de los Sentidos (The Corner of Senses) - 4:39
5. Deja de Llorar (Y Vuélvete a Levantar) (Stop Crying And Stand Up Again) - 4:18
6. La Canción de los Deseos (The Song of Desires) - 4:01
7. Y Ahora Voy a Salir (Ranxeira) (And Now I'm Going to Leave [ranchera version]) - 3:53
8. Runa Llena* (Full Rune) - 4:46
9. Resacosix en la Barra (cover version of Queen's "'39") - 3:47
10. No Queda sino Batirnos (There's no option but to Fight) - 4:19
11. Sin Ti, Sería Silencio (Parte II) (Without You, It Would Be Silence) - 4:42
12. Si Molesto, Me Quedo (If I Disturb, I Stay) - 4:38
13. El Espíritu del Bosque II (Outro) (The Spirit Of the Forest II) - 1:15
- * A play on the phrase "Full Moon", in Spanish "Luna Llena".
