= Belfast (album) =

Compilation album of cover songs by Mägo de Oz
- Released: 2004
- Genre: Heavy metal; hard rock
- Label: Locomotive Music

Mägo de Oz chronology
Gaia (2003)	Belfast (2004)	Madrid - Las Ventas (2005)

Belfast is a cover album by folk metal artists Mägo de Oz, which was released in 2004.

== Track listing ==
1. "Irish Pub" (cover of Gwendal) - 3:00
2. "Belfast" (cover of Boney M.) - 4:53
3. "La Rosa de los Vientos" (metal version of The Compass Rose) - 6:20
4. "Dame tu Amor"(cover of Whitesnake's "Guilty of Love") (Give me your love) - 3:25
5. "Mujer Amante" (cover of Rata Blanca) (Lover Woman) - 7:03
6. "Alma" (orchestral version) (Soul) - 6:49
7. "Más que una Intención" (cover of Asfalto) (More than an intention) - 7:18
8. "Dama Negra" (cover of Uriah Heep's "Lady in Black") - 5:03
9. "Todo Irá Bien" (cover of Elvis Presley's "Can't Help Falling in Love") (Everything will be ok) - 5:19
10. "Se Acabó" (cover of Leño) (This is the end) - 2:53
11. "Hasta que tu Muerte nos Separe" (orchestral version) (Till your death do us part) - 5:32
12. "Somewhere Over the Rainbow" (cover of Israel Kamakawiwo'ole) - 4:37

=== DVD ===
1. "La rosa de los vientos" (video)
2. "Entrevista - Photo Gallery"
- All tracks written by Mägo de Oz except when noted.

== Members ==
- Mägo de Oz
- Víctor García - Additional vocals on La Rosa De Los Vientos (guest)
