= Blues fiddle =

"Blues fiddle" is a generic term for bowed, stringed instruments played on the arm or shoulder that are used to play blues music.

While unequivocally an African-American creation, with the rising popularity of the blues, violinists in the Anglo-American dance fiddling traditions and white country fiddlers, adopted stylistic elements and added songs from the blues to their repertoire.

Blues violin features most prominently in rural blues, string-band, jug band and jazz. It won this attention because, "The violin is by nature a lead instrument that can replicate vocal expressions through the use of vibrato and sliding notes."

== History ==
In the 17th century, before the blues existed as a genre, the violin featured prominently in African-American string bands.

As a result of the social climate in the early 20th century, especially in the rural Southern United States, black fiddlers and black music in general were under-represented in the music industry. Blues violin comprises a part of the larger repertoire of African American string-band music, first recorded in the 1920s. Some of the earliest documented blues fiddling is Bessie Smith's recording with Robert Robbins in 1924.

The surviving recorded music from this era presents a skewed portrait. Dixon, Goderich and Rye's discography of pre-1999 blues and gospel recordings identifies sixty-eight fiddlers as principal artists and accompanists. As Marshall Wyatt points out, "the violin once held center stage in the rich pageant of vernacular music that evolved in the American South … and the fiddle held sway as the dominant folk instrument of both races until the dawn of the 20th century." As the practice demands of the fiddle conflicted with the work life of most musicians during the Depression, fiddlers found little opportunities to record. The violin fell out of use among blues players beginning in the 1930s.

When the record business began to expand in the mid 1950s, increasing demand for guitarists and a change in style resulted in even fewer chances for frontline fiddlers to participate. Another reason for the violin's exclusion in post war blues was that it could not be effectively electrified. When artists migrated to the industrial centers from the Mississippi Delta and rural south, they found a way to do so, but African-American music later mostly abandoned the instrument.

Many blues guitar greats, such as Lonnie Johnson and Big Bill Broonzy, made early recordings on the violin. They are among the most-represented artists in the canon. The connection between guitar and violin is highlighted by these players' respective melodic sensibility. The violin's history, in the context of the overarching history of the blues, is reflected by the career trajectories of these two artists.

== Characteristics ==
Typically a single fiddle is used with other instruments (most often a guitar) and a vocalist.

=== Tuning ===
For the majority of recordings, the strings are tuned a fifth apart, usually to some approximation of standard violin tuning: (from lowest to highest note) G, D, A, E. However, during the height of blues violin recordings 440 Hz for A was a far less commonly used concert pitch. Concert pitch apparently varied from ensemble to ensemble, from one recording session to the next, and quite likely from day to day, or from one climate to the next. Groups such as Jack Kelly and his South Memphis Jug Band and the Mississippi Sheiks, tuned as much as a minor third, or three semi-tones low for various recordings.

=== Key signatures ===
Although the keys of C, G, and D appear frequently, blues fiddle, is very often played in keys more commonly associated with jazz, and more often heard on horns: Bb, Eb, Ab, and F.

=== Playing position ===
In contrast to many of the Anglo-American rural fiddlers, most blues fiddlers adopted a semi-classical posture, holding the instrument high on the shoulder and gripping the bow at the frog rather than over the hair. Right-hand technique employed heavy on-string bowing, limited string crossings and bowed tremolo. Left-hand technique emphasized simple fingerings, slid into third and fifth positions, and used few or no fingered ornaments such as trills and turns.

Though orchestral violin playing uses varied techniques, the position is usually very regal in a sense; the performer is meant to sit up on the edge of their seat, with the violin sitting on a shoulder rest and more often than not, right out of their periphery. Blues fiddle is almost exactly opposite. The playing position is left entirely up to the player, usually without the utilization of a shoulder rest, with the fiddle leaned substantially forward where the player can see the whole fingerboard. This is due to the fact that most blues fiddlers improvise their music. The bow is typically played closer to the fingerboard, depending upon the style of the piece and the individual player. The actual bow is played closer to the frog, which is the bottom of the bow.

== Repertoire ==
Blues, jazz, jug band, country dances, rags, stomps, folk songs, hokum, western swing.

== List of notable blues fiddlers ==
- Lonnie Johnson
- Eddie Anthony
- Andrew and Jim Baxter
- Charlie Pierce
- Howard Armstrong
- Big Bill Broonzy
- James Cole
- Henry "Son" Sims
- Clarence "Gatemouth" Brown
- Papa John Creach
- Don "Sugarcane" Harris

== Blues fiddle discography ==
- Violin, Sing the Blues for Me : African-American Fiddlers 1926-1949 : Old Hat CD-1002
- Folks, He Sure do Pull Some Bow : Vintage Fiddle Music, 1927-1935 : Blues, Jazz, Stomps, Shuffles & Rags : Old Hat CD 1003

== Additional resources ==
- Glenn, Eddie.Fiddlin' Folk. Talequah Daily Press, June 25, 2007. Retrieved January 8, 2009.
- Wright, Leif M. Greatness wears a big beard: World's best rock fiddle player also inspires. OK Weekend.com. July 20, 2007. Retrieved January 8, 2009.
- Tryggestad, Erik and Colberg, Chris. Weekend Look: In town and around. The Oklahoman, November 3, 2006. Retrieved January 8, 2009.
- Blogspot.com. An Interview with Randy Crouch. Formerly published on the now defunct Texas Troubadours website. September 5, 2007. Retrieved January 12, 2009.
- a b Critter, Chris B. The 'green' beginnings of red dirt. The Current, December, 2008, p. 68-9. Retrieved January 9, 2009.
- Critter, Chris B. The farm that grew the red dirt. The Current, October, 2008, p. 14-5. Retrieved January 9, 2009.
- Conner, Thomas. Guthrie folk festival "matures". Tulsa World, July 15, 2002. Retrieved January 9, 2009.
- Woody Guthrie Folk Festival website. Sneak Preview of 2007 Woody Guthrie Folk Festival Entertainers. Retrieved January 8, 2009.
- Reverbnation.com. Randy Crouch. Retrieved January 12, 2009.
