= Mägo de Oz =

Spanish folk metal band

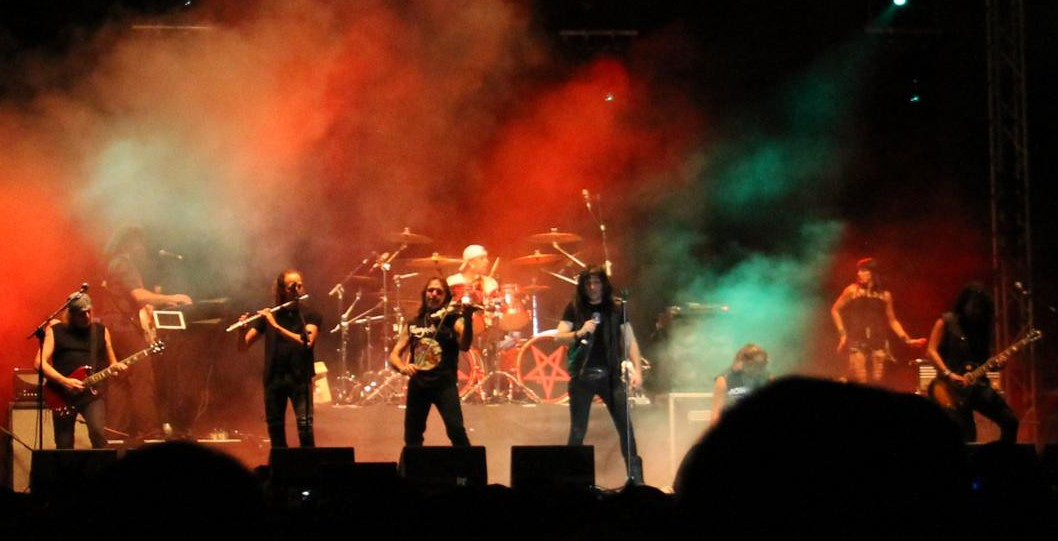
- Mägo de Oz in Valencia in 2015

Background information
- Origin: Begoña, Madrid, Spain
- Genres: Folk metal; Celtic metal; power metal
- Years active: 1988–present
- Label: Warner Dro Atlantic
- Members: Txus di Fellatio (1988–); Carlos Prieto "Mohamed" (1992–); Victor de Andrés (2020–); Fernando Mainer (2012–); Rafa Blas (2023–); Manuel Seoane (2018–)
- Website: magodeozoficial.com

Mägo de Oz (Spanish for Wizard of Oz, with a metal umlaut) are a Spanish folk metal band from Begoña, Madrid formed in mid-1988 by drummer Txus di Fellatio. The band became well known for the strong Celtic feel to their music strengthened through their consistent usage of a violinist and flautist. The name for the band was chosen, according to founding member Txus, because "life is a yellow brick road, on which we walk in the company of others searching for our dreams." On the 26th of October, 2018, the band played a special concert to celebrate their 30th anniversary, playing with a symphony orchestra at the WiZink Center in Madrid.

== History ==
=== Early stages ===
The band was founded in 1988 by the drummer Txus di Fellatio, who slowly recruited the rest of the members for the band, finalising the line-up by 1992. Originally, the band was called "Transilvania" ("Transylvania" in Spanish), named after an instrumental piece by Iron Maiden, a heavy influence on the band. In 1992, the band members were Txus (drums and backing vocals), Mohamed (violin), Charlie (lead guitar), Chema (rhythm guitar), Salva (bass), and Juanma (lead vocals, backup drums). They recorded several demos: Y qué más da (in 1989), Canción de cuna para un bohemio (1990), and Con la cabeza bien alta, in 1992. Their music had a wide range of styles and influences, but was primarily based around folk metal and Celtic music.

In 1992, the band was a finalist in the "Concurso Villa de Madrid", and in 1994, the band released their debut album, produced by Txus and Alberto Plaza under the name Mago de Oz. This album found very little success and people were barely aware of the band's existence. During this time, Mago de Oz went through a period of turbulence and substantial line-up changes, before the line-up that has persisted almost until the present time was formed in 1996. At this point, the lineup consisted of Txus (drums and backing vocals), Mohamed (violin and backing vocals), Carlitos (lead Guitar and backing vocals), Frank (rhythm Guitar, acoustic guitar, and backing vocals), Salva (bass and backing vocals), and José Andrëa (lead Vocals, keyboards).

=== Jesús de Chamberí and La leyenda de La Mancha ===
The same year, the band began recording their rock opera album, Jesús de Chamberí, produced by Alberto Plaza and the band themselves, which told a story of Jesus returning to the Madrid neighbourhood of Chamberí. The album was edited and released on the label Locomotive Music. Mago de Oz saw a huge surge in popularity across Spain following the release of the album, which was promoted with the "Via Crucis Tour". In 1997, the band decided to re-record five songs from their debut album with the new singer. The resulting EP was officially self-titled, but it referred to by many fans as La Bruja ("The Witch" in Spanish), as the album cover features a witch playing a violin with a moon backdrop. The name has now become as a de facto name for the EP and even the official website now refers to the EP as "La Bruja". La Bruja surpassed the success of Jesús de Chamberí, further raised Mägo de Oz's profile, and led to more festival appearances.

Clearly fans of concept albums and rock operas, Mägo de Oz released their third album, La Leyenda de La Mancha, a modern retelling of Miguel de Cervantes' Don Quixote. Rock opera has been a feature of all of their albums from Jesús de Chamberí onwards. Mägo de Oz embarked on "The Riiiichal Tour", which consisted of 115 dates, their longest to that point. To mark the success of La leyenda de La Mancha, and to mark their tenth anniversary, the band released a documentary about themselves entitled "Resacosix en Hispania", in 1999, later released on DVD in 2004.

Mägo de Oz - Molinos de Viento
30 second sample from Mägo de Oz "Molinos de Viento", from the album La Leyenda de la Mancha.

=== Conceptual phase ===
Towards the end of 1999 Mägo de Oz started writing and recording a double album named Finisterra, released in 2000. For this album they added Sergio "Kiskilla" on keyboards and accordion and Fernando on flute. This album was the most folk of their albums, while still rooted in heavy metal. The live tour supporting this album featured more elaborate stage production, with more sophisticated sets, pyrotechnics, and lights. Around this time bassist Salva left the band, to be replaced by Sergio. In 2002, the band released their first live album, Fölktergeist, a compilation of songs played at various shows on the tour.

In 2003, Mägo de Oz released Gaia, the first album in a trilogy which would be completed in 2010. The album was a concept album with two main themes: the Spanish conquest of America and the ecological damage wrought by mankind on Earth (Gaia). The CD liner notes detail the plot of the concept album. The album, with a Celtic rock sound, features flutes and violins, and met with a mixed reception. Around this time, Mägo de Oz started performing concerts in Latin America.

In 2004, Mägo de Oz returned to the studio to record Belfast named after the city in Northern Ireland and the numerous sectarian conflicts that have taken place there. Many of the songs on the album are simply re-recordings of songs on previous albums. The band recorded a metal version of "La Rosa de los Vientos" as well as adding some orchestral parts to certain earlier songs. They also added a third guitarist, Jorge Salán, and the bassist, Sergio, left the band.

=== Change of label ===
In 2005, Mägo de Oz released two albums. The first one, was a second live album called Madrid - Las Ventas, recorded in Madrid's bullfighting arena, Las Ventas. There were some contractual complications with this album, since Locomotive Music had released the album, and Mägo de Oz had now signed with a new label, and therefore, Locomotive Music did not have the consent of the band. The second disc, Gaia II: La Voz Dormida, on the new label, Warner Dro, was the second album in the Gaia trilogy and contained the single "La Posada de los Muertos". For this album, they recruited another bassist, Pedro "Peri". After "La Posada de los Muertos" came the "Hoy Toca Ser Feliz" and "Diabulus in Musica". "Hoy Toca Ser Feliz" was accompanied by a video with the members of the band dressed as the characters from The Wizard of Oz, Txus drumming in costume as Glinda the Good Witch, with giant wings. During the tour for Gaia II, Txus temporarily left the band due to extreme exhaustion and personal problems. His substitute for a month and a half period was Joaquín Arellano. On 8 September 2006, Txus returned to the drums.

On 5 December 2006, Mägo de Oz released their first greatest hits album Rock n' Oz, including a re-recording of the songs "Molinos de Viento, "Jesús de Chamberí", "Hasta que tu Muerte nos Separe", and "El Cantar de la luna Oscura". The album is a double album; the first disc contains singles and the second non-singles. A special edition of Rock n' Oz, entitled The Best Oz came in a box set with the original two discs and an extra disc of rare recordings, including old recordings of songs never before released with the first singer Juanma still in the lineup. It also contains a DVD documenting their American tour.

On 10 October 2007, the video for their single "Y ahora voy a salir" ("And now I'm going to leave") was uploaded to the band's website. The single was released on 16 October 2007 and was the first from their album La Ciudad de los Árboles (The city of trees), which was released on 6 November. On 10 November 2008, Jorge Salán announced on the band's website that he was leaving the band to focus on his own music. Salán would continue recording and touring with the band on special occasions.

On April 6, 2010, the band released Gaia III: Atlantia, the final part of the Gaia trilogy. That same year they released Gaia - Epílogo, an extra album connected to the trilogy featuring songs that were not included on any of the original releases.

=== Departure of José Andrea ===
In late 2011, lead vocalist and keyboardist José Andrëa left Mägo de Oz, citing personal problems and differences with the band. Asked why he had left, he replied: "Because I don't feel the group as I did before. The moment the love itself shatters, it's better to end it before living a farce. But we still are more than brothers. I guess the breaking point was noticing that I wasn't motivated, a band like Mägo de Oz doesn't deserve a front man that only gives a 50%. The moment of conversing with my fellow band members was somewhat tranquil, I explained how I felt we hugged it out and shed a tear or two." Fans and Spanish media speculated that Andrëa had left the band because the length of the band's shows had exhausted his voice, which Andrea denied. After the end of the tour on 30 December, Mägo de Oz decided to take a break to look for a new vocalist, and Andrëa started work on a new project José Andrëa y Uróboros.

In 2013, Mägo de Oz released Hechizos, pócimas y brujería in double vinyl and digibook formats, featuring new vocalist Zeta. A two-disc compilation entitled Celtic Land was released on 13 November 2013 to celebrate the 25th anniversary of the creation of the group. The first disc consists of the band's hits sung in English by renowned artists from Europe, such as Jonne Järvelä of Korpiklaani, Damnagoras of Elvenking, Eric Martin from Mr. Big, Ralf Scheepers from Primal Fear, and Paul Shortino from King Kobra. The second disc contains several of their hits with Jose Andrëa and Zeta and some remastered tracks performed by artists such as Leo Jimenez, Víctor García, and Cristian Bertonceli. The album was released internationally in countries where the band was previously unknown such as England, Italy, and Japan.

Their next album was Ilussia, released on 21 October 2014. The concept of the album revolves around a bloody circus, abandoned in a forest, that comes alive. The album features a symphony orchestra with soprano and falsetto choruses and choirs, incorporating Power Metal and Folk.

For the 15th anniversary of their album Finisterra, Mägo de Oz re-recorded the album in the band's current style, featuring numerous collaborations. The album, Finisterra Opera Rock, was released in November 2015. New albums Ira Dei and Bandera Negra followed in 2019 and 2021, the former featuring the collaboration of their mentored band Débler. Their album Alicia en el Metalverso (2024) with new singer Rafa Blas (former winner of the Spanish version of The Voice) earned them a Latin Grammy nomination.

== Band members ==
=== Current ===
- Txus di Fellatio – drums (1988–present)
- Diego Palacio – flute, bagpipes, galician gaita, castilian whistle, Irish whistle, bodhran (2020–present)
- Fernando Mainer – bass guitar (2012–present)
- Jorge Salán – lead guitar (2004–2008, 2023–present)
- Victor de Andrés – lead and rhythmic guitar (2020–present)
- Ix Valiery - rhythmic and lead guitar (2024-present)
- Francesco Antonelli - keyboards, synthesizers (2023–present)
- Rafa Blas - vocals (2023–present)
- Carlos Prieto 'Mohamed' – violin (1992–present)
- Raquel Eugenio 'Xana Lavey' - backing vocals (2025-present)

=== Former members ===
- Salva – bass guitar (1989–2002)
- Charlie – lead guitar (1990-1993)
- Juanma Rodríguez – vocals (1989–1995)
- José María Alonso "Chema" – rhythm guitar (1990–1996)
- Tony del Corral – saxophone (1994)
- Auri – vocals (1995–1996)
- Sergio Martínez – bass guitar (2003–2004)
- Luis Miguel Navalón – bass guitar (2004)
- Fernando Ponce de León – flute, whistles, gaita, bagpipes (1999–2010:died 2024)
- José Andrëa – vocals (1996–2011)
- Pedro Diaz "Peri" – bass guitar (2004–2012)
- Sergio Cisneros "Kiskilla" – keyboards, accordion (1999–2012:died 2025)
- J.C. Marín "Carlitos" - guitar (1992–2020)
- Francisco Javier Gómez de la Serna "Frank" - guitar (1996–2020)
- Javi Díez – keyboards, synthesizers, accordion, rhythm guitar (2012–2022)
- Manuel Ramil - keyboards, synthesizers (2022)
- Javier Domínguez 'Zeta' – vocals (2012–2023)
- Patricia Tapia – backing vocals (2007–2023)
- Manuel Seoane – guitar (2018–2023)

== Discography ==
=== Studio albums ===
- Mägo de Oz (1994)
- Jesús de Chamberí (1996)
- La Leyenda de la Mancha (1998)
- Finisterra (2000)
- Gaia (2003)
- Belfast (2004)
- Gaia II: La Voz Dormida (2005)
- La Ciudad de los Árboles (2007)
- Gaia III: Atlantia (2010)
- Gaia: Epílogo (2010)
- Hechizos, pócimas y brujería (2012)
- Ilussia (2014)
- Finisterra Opera Rock (2015)
- Ira Dei (2019)
- Bandera Negra (2021)
- Alicia en el Metalverso (2024)
- Malicia: la noche de las brujas (2025)

=== Live albums ===
- Fölktergeist (2002)
- Madrid - Las Ventas (2005)
- A Costa da Morte (2007)
- Barakaldo D.F. (2008)
- Diabulus in Opera (2017)

=== EPs ===
- Mägo de Oz (La Bruja) (1997)
- Demos EP (2016)

=== Compilations ===
- Grandes (2003)
- The Best Oz: 1988-2006 (2006)
- Rock n' Oz (2006)
- Rarezas (2006)
- Grandes Éxitos (2007)
- Love and Oz (2011)
- Celtic Land (2013)
- 30 Años 30 Canciones (2018)
- Love and Oz II (2022)

=== Singles ===
- Molinos de viento (1997)
- Resacosix en Hispania (1999)
- Fiesta pagana (2000)
- ¡Feliz Navidad, Cabrones! (2000)
- El que quiera entender que entienda (2000)
- Molinos de viento (live) (2001)
- La danza del Fuego (2001)
- Pensando en ti (2002)
- La costa del silencio (2003)
- El atrapasueños (Promo) (2004)
- La rosa de los vientos (2004)
- La posada de los muertos (2005)
- Hoy toca ser feliz (2006)
- Diabulus in Musica (2006)
- Y ahora voy a salir (Ranxeira) (2007) (No.1 Spain)
- Deja de llorar (2008)
- Que el viento sople a tu favor (2010)
- Vodka and Roll (2010)
- Xanandra (2012)
- Fiesta Pagana 2.0 (2013)
- Pagan party (2014)
- Cadaveria (2014)
- La danza del fuego (2015)
- La cantata del diablo (2017)
- Te traeré el horizonte (feat. Ara Malikian) (2019)
- El Cervezo (El árbol de la birra) (2020)
- Tu madre es una cabra (2021)
- Bandera Negra (2021)
- La Dama del Mar (2021)
- El Sombrerero Loco (2023)
- Seremos Huracán (2023)
- Luna de Sangre (2024)
- El Vals de las Almas Rotas (2025)
- La Tierra de Nunca Jamás (2025)
- La Ruta de los Sordos (2025)
- La Noche Celta (2025)

=== Demos ===
- Y qué más da (1989)
- Canción de cuna para un bohemio (1990)
- Con la cabeza bien alta (1992)
