= Jorge Salán =

Spanish guitarist (born 1982)

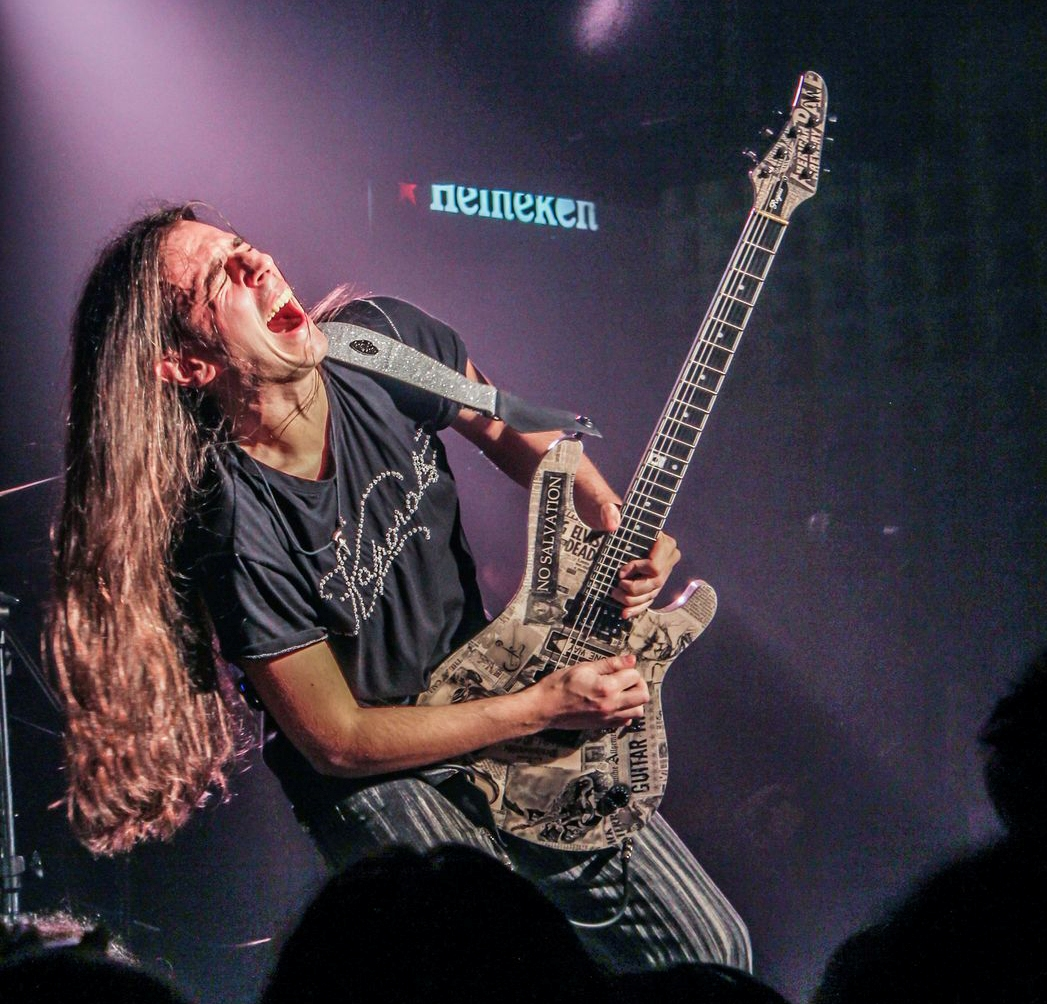
- Jorge Salán in 2012

Background information
- Born: April 4, 1982 (age 44); Madrid, Spain
- Genres: Hard rock, heavy metal, R&B
- Occupations: Musician, singer-songwriter
- Instruments: Vocals, guitar
- Years active: 1997–present
- Label: Warner Music Group
- Website: www.jorgesalan.com

Jorge Salán (born April 4, 1982) is a Spanish rock lead guitarist, singer, producer and songwriter. He is most well known for being the lead guitar for the metal rock solo singer Jeff Scott Soto (leading voice of Journey, Yngwie Malmsteen) and the Jeff Scott Soto Band (now SOTO) from 2009 till today, the lead guitar on Robin Beck's European Tour 2013, and for having collaborated with a long list of legendary rock musicians such as Fiona Flanagan or bass guitar player Bob Daisley.

== Career ==
Jorge Salán is a rock guitarist hailed, both by critics and audiences, as one of the most valuable and impressive guitarist in the rock scene nowadays. He was awarded a scholarship by the prestigious Berklee College of Music in Boston, Massachusetts at the age of 17 and recorded his first solo album at the age of 19, The Utopian Sea of Clouds. This album drew in a lot of attention within the Spanish rock scene and earned him the label of best guitarist player for several magazines and radio shows. He is also well known for being the leading guitar for the Spanish metal rock band Mägo de Oz from 2004 till 2008. In 2014 he was awarded for 10th time in a row with the "Best rock solo guitarist award" in the RockReferendum, the most important Spanish contest for rock musicians.

He has toured throughout the world presenting his solo work or accompanying other artists. With Jeff Scott Soto he has toured Brazil, Argentina and throughout Europe playing in the most prestigious Rock festivals, most notably Graspop Metal Meeting, Bang Your Head!!! and Rock Of Ages, both in Germany, sharing the stage with bands like Alice Cooper, Helloween and Slayer.

Jorge Salán often plays guitar for American singers Fiona and Robin Beck. He played for Beck at the Firefest Festival in Nottingham, England, alongside Gotthard, Tyketto and Danger Danger. He continued playing for Robin Beck on every concert of his European tours including Hard Rock Hell and Aor Festival and Sweden Rock, sharing stage with Black Sabbath, Alter Bridge and Billy Idol. Many of these prestigious artists highlight his skills and personality on a 2014 music documentary based on his life and career, No looking Back.

== Discography ==
=== Solo albums ===
- The utopian sea of clouds (2002)
- From now on (2004)
- Chronicles of an evolution (2007)
- Subsuelo (2009)
- Estatuas en la calle (2010)
- Sexto asalto (2011)
- Directo a San Javier (2012)
- No looking back (2014)
- Madrid / Texas (2015) – Rock Estatal Records.
- Graffire (2016) – Rock Estatal Records.
- Live in Madrid (2017) – Duque Producciones

== Collaborations ==
=== Mägo de Oz ===
- Belfast (2004)
- Madrid, Las Ventas (2005)
- Gaia II: La Voz Dormida (2005)
- The Best Oz (2006)
- La ciudad de los árboles (2007)
- Barakaldo D.F. (2008)

=== Miguel Ríos ===
- Solo o en compañía de otros (2008)

=== TAKO ===
- Takorce (2009)

=== Jeff Scott Soto ===
- One night in Madrid (2009)
- Damage Control (2012)

=== Robin Beck ===
- Wrecking ball (2013)

=== James Christian ===
- Lay it on me (2013)

=== Avalanch ===
- El Ángel Caído 2017 (2017)
- Hacia La Luz – Directo desde Madrid (2018)

=== Others ===
- Bob Daisley (Bajista de Ozzy Osbourne, Rainbow, Gary Moore...)
- Eric Martin (Vocalista de Mr.Big)
- Danny Vaughn (Vocalista de Tyketto y Waysted)
- Danger Danger
- Carlos Tarque (M-CLAN)
- Carmine Appice (Batería de Rod Stewart, Ozzy Osbourne...)
- Carlos Escobedo (Cantante de Sôber y Savia)
- Fiona Flanagan
- Javier Vargas (Vargas Blues Band)
- Paul Shortino (Quiet Riot)
- Abraham Laboriel (Ray Charles, Michael Jackson...)
- Joe Lynn Turner (Rainbow...)
