= Clarence "Gatemouth" Brown =

American singer and multi-instrumentalist (1924–2005)

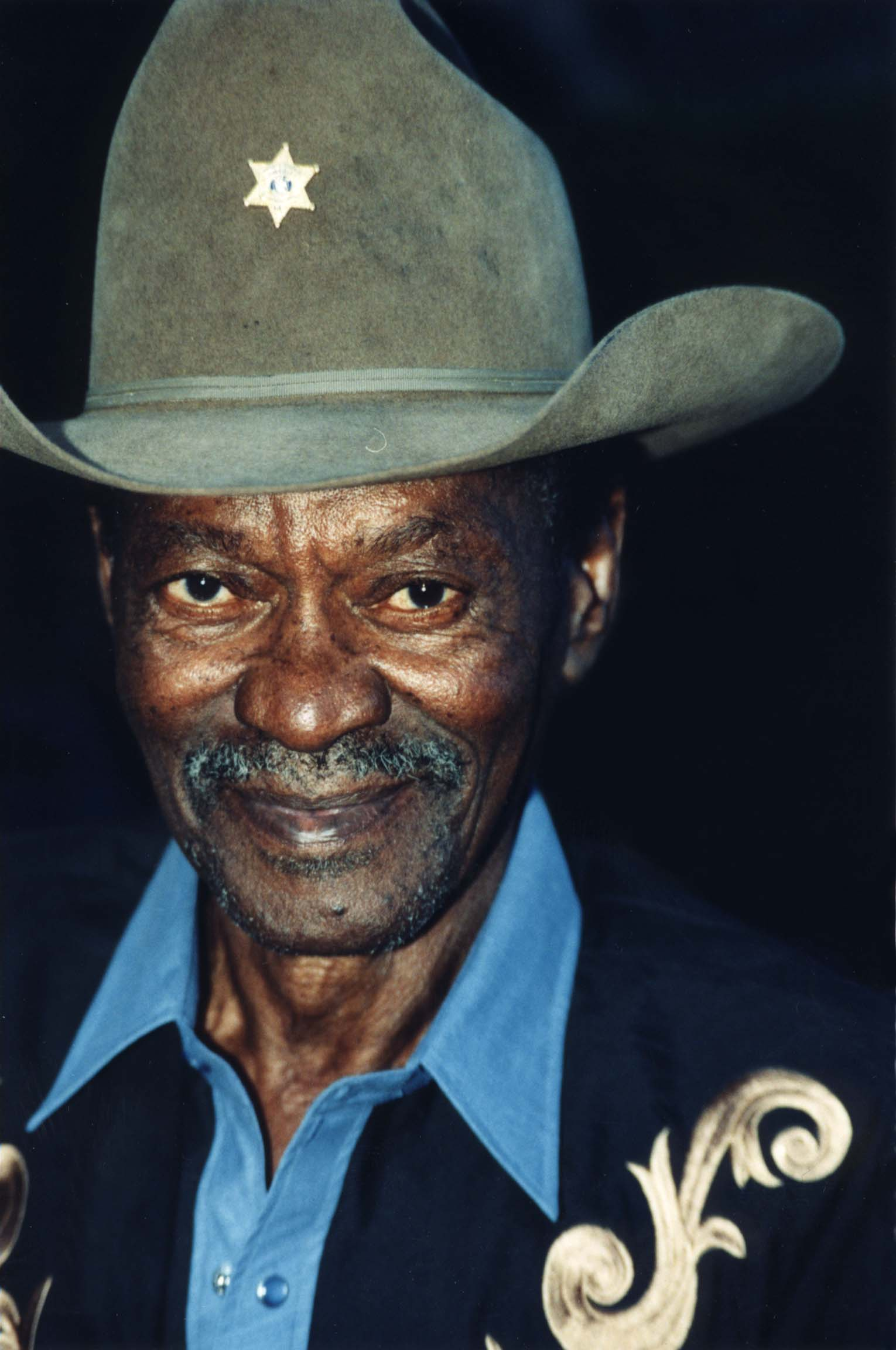
- Brown in 1999

Background information
- Born: April 18, 1924; Vinton, Louisiana, U.S.
- Died: September 10, 2005 (aged 81) Orange, Texas, U.S.
- Genres: Blues; swing; country; Cajun; R&B
- Occupation: Musician
- Instruments: Guitar; violin; vocals; viola; mandolin; drums; harmonica; piano
- Years active: 1947–2005
- Labels: Aladdin; Peacock; Cindrella Records; Black & Blue; Barclay; Music Is Medicine; Rounder; Alligator; Verve; Occidental

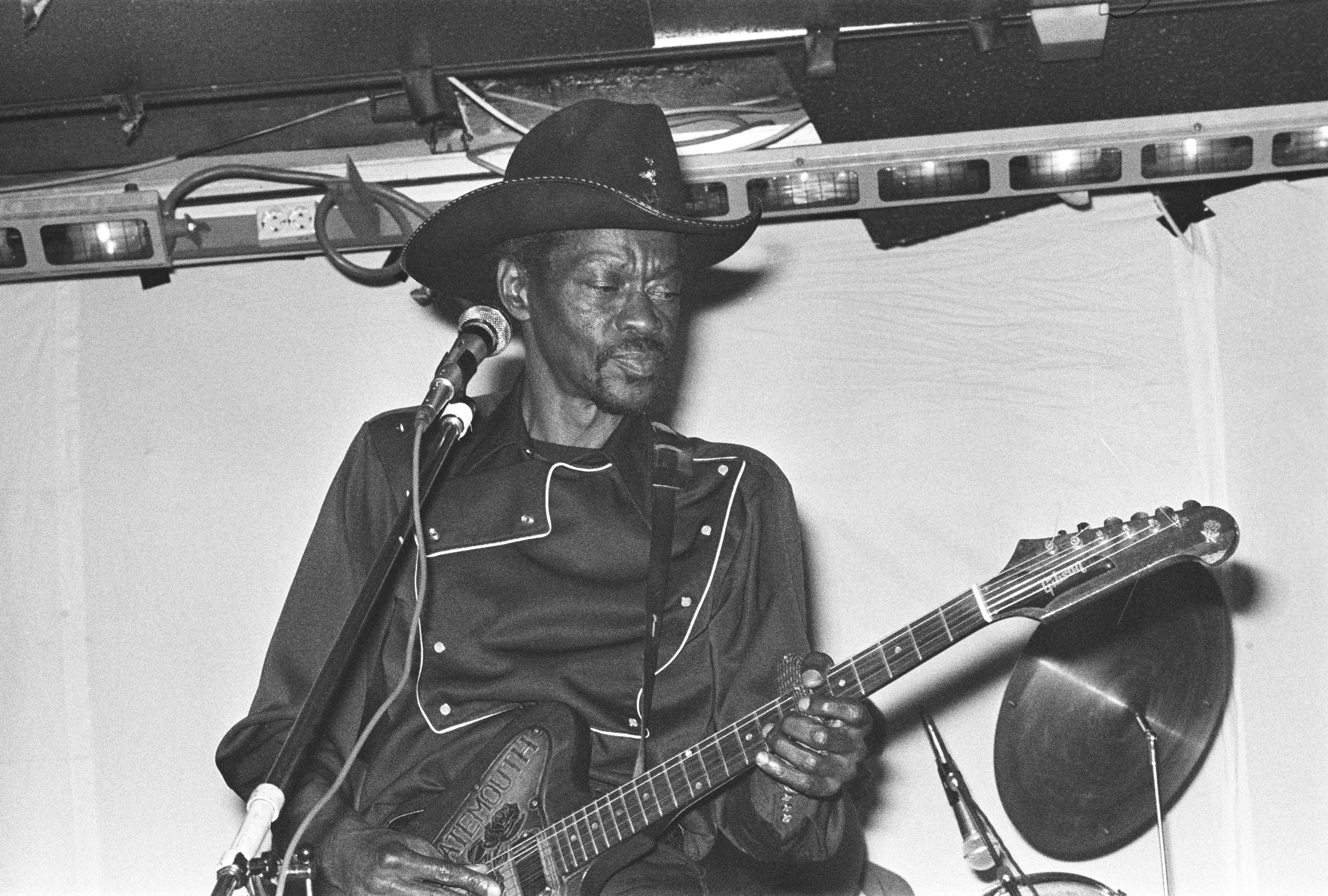
Clarence "Gatemouth" Brown playing guitar on stage in Norway (1981)

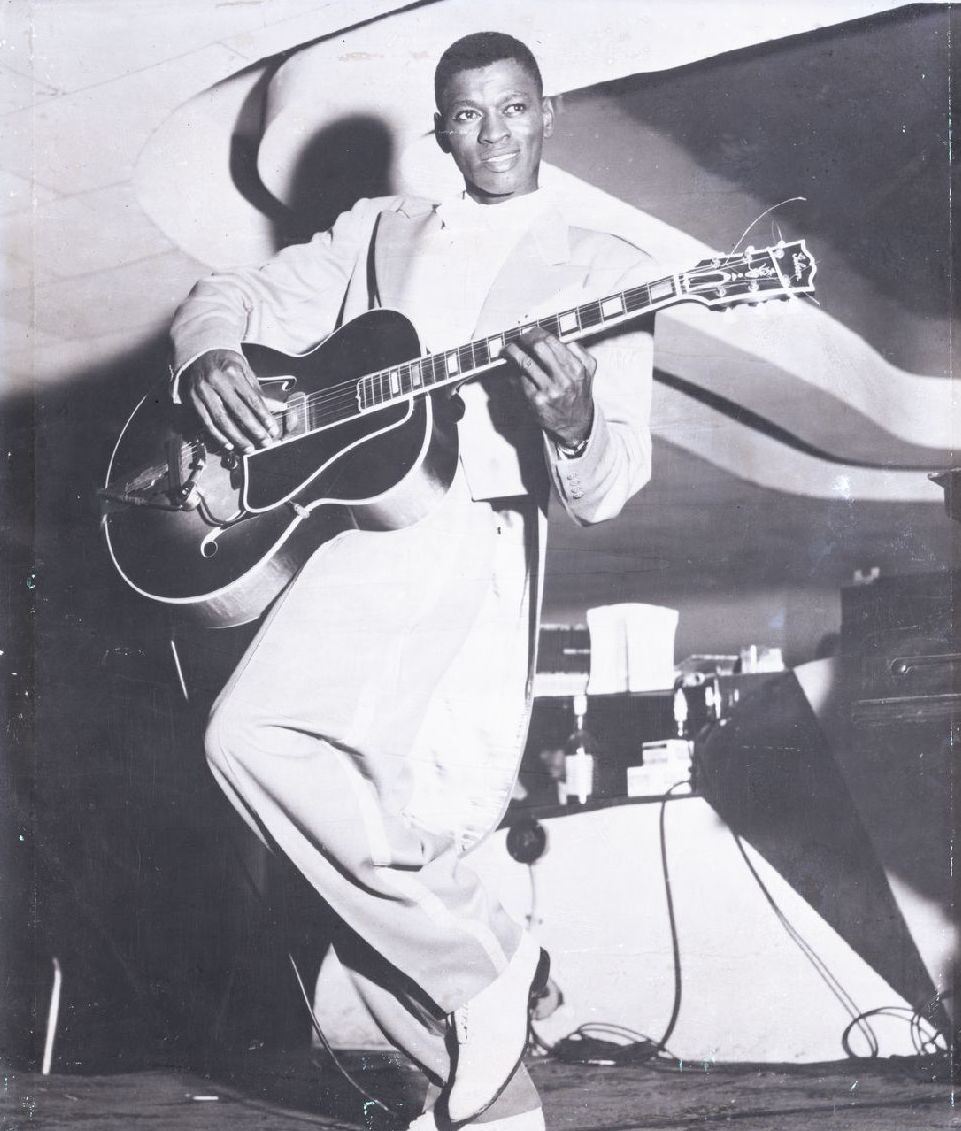
Clarence "Gatemouth" Brown in 1940s Duke-Peacock Records publicity photo

Clarence "Gatemouth" Brown (April 18, 1924 – September 10, 2005) was an American singer and multi-instrumentalist from Louisiana. He was best-known as a blues performer, but his music was often eclectic and also touched on genres including country, jazz and rock and roll. Brown won a Grammy Award for Best Traditional Blues Album in 1983 for his album, Alright Again!

== Early life ==
Brown was born in Vinton, Louisiana, and raised near Orange, Texas. His father was a railroad worker and local musician who taught him several musical instruments, including fiddle by age 5; as well as piano and guitar. He had at least one brother.

== Career ==
Brown was performing guitar by age ten. He also played drums in swing bands as a teenager.

=== 1940s and 1950s ===
Brown served in the military during World War II. His professional music career began in 1945, playing drums in San Antonio, Texas. He was given the nickname "Gatemouth" by a high school teacher who said he had a "voice like a gate". His career was boosted when he attended a concert by T-Bone Walker in Don Robey's Bronze Peacock Houston nightclub in 1947; Walker became ill, and Brown took up his guitar and quickly wrote and played "Gatemouth Boogie", to the delight of the audience.

In 1949 Robey founded Peacock Records in order to showcase Brown's virtuoso guitar work. Brown's "Mary Is Fine" backed with "My Time Is Expensive" was a hit for Peacock in 1949. A string of Peacock releases in the 1950s were less successful commercially, but were nonetheless pioneering musically. Particularly notable was the 1954 instrumental "Okie Dokie Stomp", in which Brown solos continuously over a punchy horn section (other instrumentals from this period include "Boogie Uproar" and "Gate Walks to Board"). "Okie Dokie Stomp" was also recorded by Cornell Dupree in the 1970s, who also had a commercial success with it. As for his gutsy violin playing, Robey allowed Brown to record "Just Before Dawn", his final release on the Peacock label, in 1959.

=== 1960s and 1970s ===
In the 1960s Brown moved to Nashville, Tennessee, to participate in a syndicated R&B television show, and while he was there recorded several country singles. He struck up a friendship with Roy Clark and made several appearances on the television show Hee Haw. In 1966, Brown was the musical director for the house band on the short-lived television program, The !!!! Beat. Later in the decade, he worked as a deputy sheriff in New Mexico.

However, in the early 1970s several countries in Europe had developed an appreciation for American roots music, especially the blues, and Brown was a popular and well-respected artist there. He toured Europe twelve times, beginning in 1971 and continuing throughout the 1970s. He also became an official ambassador for American music, and participated in several tours sponsored by the U.S. State Department, including an extensive tour of Eastern Africa. Brown appeared at the 1973 Montreux Jazz Festival, where he jammed with American blues rock band Canned Heat, playing guitar and harmonica. In 1974, he recorded as a sideman with the New Orleans pianist Professor Longhair on his album, Rock 'N' Roll Gumbo (originally a Blue Star Records release). He moved to New Orleans in the late 1970s. In 1979, through his manager at the time, Jim Halsey, Brown embarked on a 6-week, 44 concert tour of the Soviet Union. This was an historic event as it marked the first time the Soviet Union made a contract with a U.S. private citizen (Jim Halsey) as regards a musical tour. All previous tours were under the auspices of the U.S. State Department. This was by far the most extensive tour an American band had taken in the USSR.

=== Later years ===
In the 1980s, a series of releases on Rounder Records and Alligator Records revitalized his U.S. career, and he toured extensively and internationally, usually playing between 250 and 300 shows a year. He won a Grammy in 1982 for the album Alright Again! and was nominated for five more. Alright Again! is credited with putting Brown back on the musical map. He also won eight W. C. Handy Awards.

In 1999, Brown was inducted into the Blues Hall of Fame. The next year, he sat in as a guest with the Saturday Night Live Band on April 15, 2000.

In his last years, he maintained a full touring schedule, including Australia, New Zealand, South America, Africa and Eastern Europe. His final record Timeless was released in 2004.

== Personal life ==
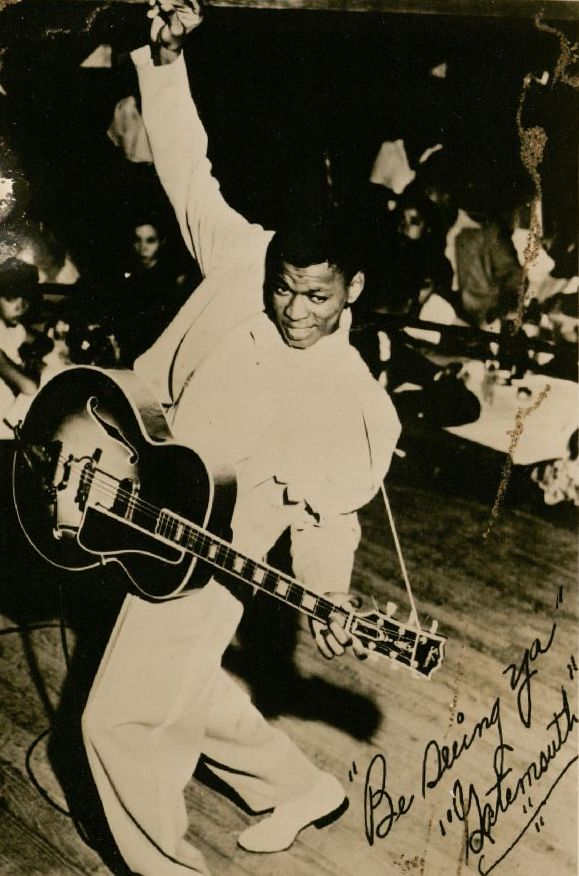
Performance at the Bronze Peacock Dinner Club in 1947 or 1948

Brown was married and divorced three times. He had four children: three daughters, Ursula Brown of Houston, Celeste Biles of Vista, California, and Renée Brown of New Orleans, and a son, Dwayne Brown, of Oklahoma City.

Brown smoked a pipe. In September 2004, Brown was diagnosed with lung cancer. He already had emphysema and heart disease, and he and his doctors decided to forgo treatment for the cancer. His home in Slidell, Louisiana, was destroyed by Hurricane Katrina on August 29, 2005, although he had been evacuated to his childhood hometown of Orange, Texas, and lived with his brother before the storm hit.

He died in Orange on September 10, 2005, at the apartment of a grandniece, at the age of 81. Brown is buried in the Hollywood Cemetery in Orange. Flooding caused by Hurricane Ike in September 2008 damaged his grave. His grave has since been refurbished and through the estate funds, a headstone has been erected in his honor. A marker honoring Brown was placed by the Texas Historical Commission next to the flagpole at Hollywood Cemetery.

== Musical style and influences ==
Known for his work as a blues musician, Brown spent his career fighting purism by synthesizing traditional blues and country, jazz, Cajun music and rhythm and blues.

Brown was acclaimed for his skills on multiple instruments, including the guitar, mandolin, viola, violin, harmonica and drums. He is regarded as one of the most influential exponents of the blues fiddle and has had enormous influence in American fiddle circles.

Brown's biggest musical influences were Louis Jordan, T-Bone Walker, and Count Basie. His highly original electric guitar style influenced many blues and rock guitarists, including Guitar Slim, Albert Collins, and Johnny "Guitar" Watson.

Composer Frank Zappa, in his autobiography, The Real Frank Zappa Book (1989), credited Brown, along with Guitar Slim and Johnny "Guitar" Watson, as important influences on his guitar playing.

== Discography ==
=== Original albums ===
- 1972 The Blues Ain't Nothing (Black & Blue 33.033; CD reissue: Black & Blue BB-428.2)
- 1973 Sings Louis Jordan (Black & Blue 33.053)
- 1973 Cold Strange [AKA Cold Storage] (Black & Blue 33.096; CD reissue: Black & Blue 59096.2)
- 1973 Gate's On The Heat [AKA The Drifter Rides Again] (Blue Star/Barclay 80 603; CD reissue: Sunnyside SSC-3052)
- 1974 Rock 'n' Roll Gumbo (with Professor Longhair) (Blue Star/Barclay 80 606; CD reissue: Sunnyside SSC-3049)
- 1974 Down South...In The Bayou Country (Barclay 90 002; CD reissue: Sunnyside SSC-3046)
- 1975 The Bogalusa Boogie Man (Barclay 90 035; CD reissue: Sunnyside SSC-3060)
- 1977 Heatwave (with Lloyd Glenn) (Black & Blue 33.129; CD reissue: Black & Blue BB-465.2)
- 1977 Blackjack (Music Is Medicine MIM-9002; CD reissue: Sugar Hill SHCD-3891)
- 1978 Double Live At The Cowboy Bar (Music Is Medicine MIM-9013) 2-LP
- 1979 Makin' Music (with Roy Clark) (MCA 3161; CD reissue: MCA Special Products MCAD-22125)
- 1981 Alright Again! (Rounder 2028)
- 1983 One More Mile (Rounder 2034)
- 1986 Real Life (Rounder 2054)
- 1989 Standing My Ground (Alligator AL-4779)
- 1992 No Looking Back (Alligator AL-4804)
- 1994 The Man (Verve/Gitanes 523761)
- 1995 Long Way Home (Verve/Gitanes 529465)
- 1997 Gate Swings (Verve/Gitanes 537617)
- 1999 American Music, Texas Style (Verve/Blue Thumb 547536)
- 2001 Back To Bogalusa (Verve/Blue Thumb 549785)
- 2004 Timeless (Hightone HCD-8174)

=== Compilations and bootlegs ===
- 1974 San Antonio Ballbuster (Red Lightnin') Peacock recordings
- 1980 Texas Blues [Live in Concert, Internationales Jazzfestival Bern, SBV]
- 1983 Atomic Energy (Blues Boy) Peacock recordings
- 1985 Pressure Cooker (Alligator) Black & Blue recordings
- 1985 More Stuff (Black & Blue) Black & Blue recordings
- 1987 Texas Swing (Rounder) Rounder recordings
- 1989 Hot Times Tonight (P-Vine) various recordings of the 1960–1970s
- 1990 The Original Peacock Recordings (Rounder) Peacock recordings
- 1993 Just Got Lucky (Evidence Music) Black & Blue recordings
- 1994 Clarence "Gatemouth" Brown: Live (Charly) [previously unreleased live recording]
- 1995 The Best of Clarence "Gatemouth" Brown: A Blues Legend (Verve) Barclay recordings
- 1999 Okie Dokie Stomp (Bullseye Blues & Jazz) Rounder recordings
- 1999 Guitar In My Hand (Catfish) Aladdin and Peacock recordings
- 1999 Hot Club Drive (P-Vine) Black & Blue recordings
- 1999 The Blues Ain't Nothing (P-Vine) Black & Blue recordings
- 2000 Okie Dokie (AIM) various recordings of the 1960s
- 2002 The Chronological "Gatemouth" Brown: 1947–1951 (Classics "Blues & Rhythm" series) Aladdin and Peacock recordings
- 2003 Clarence "Gatemouth" Brown: In Concert (DVD)
- 2005 The Chronological "Gatemouth" Brown: 1952–1954 (Classics "Blues & Rhythm" series) Peacock recordings
- 2006 Dirty Work At The Crossroads 1947–1953 (Acrobat) Aladdin and Peacock recordings
- 2010 Rockin' Boogie Blues (Blues Boulevard) Aladdin and Peacock recordings
- 2017 Boogie Uproar: The Complete Aladdin/Peacock Singles As & Bs 1947–1961 (Jasmine)

=== Other contributions ===
- 1976 Grey's Mood (with Al Grey) rec. 1973–1975 (Black & Blue 33.085; Classic Jazz CJ-118; CD reissue: Black & Blue BB-912.2)
- 2003 Johnny's Blues: A Tribute to Johnny Cash (NorthernBlues) Brown sings Johnny Cash's 1956 rockabilly song "Get Rhythm" with Benjy Davis

== See also ==
- List of blues musicians
- List of fiddlers
- List of Gibson players
- Music of Texas
