= Jesús de Chamberí =

Studio album by Mägo de Oz
- Released: 1996
- Genre: Folk metal
- Length: 67:15
- Label: Locomotive Music

Mägo de Oz chronology
Mägo de Oz (1994)	Jesús de Chamberí (1996)	Mägo de Oz (La Bruja) (1997)

Jesús de Chamberí is the second album by Spanish folk metal band Mägo de Oz, which was released in 1996. The album that made Mägo de Oz popular in Spain, when they reached 72 on the national charts.

It is a rock opera about a modern-day Jesus in Madrid, and the start of the band's trend of heavily criticizing the Catholic Church. This concept album was the first album with their third and most popular singer José Andrëa.

== Track listing ==
1. "Génesis" - 1:03
2. "Jesús de Chamberí" (Jesus of Chamberí) - 7:30
3. "El ángel caído" (The Fallen Angel) - 5:05
4. "Al-Mejandría" (parody of "Alexandria", ancient city of Egypt) - 3:46
5. "El cuco y la zíngara" (The Cuco and the Gypsy) - 4:05
6. "Hasta que tu muerte nos separe" (Till your death do us part) - 5:40
7. "La canción de Pedro" (Peter's Song) - 5:32
8. "Domingo de gramos" (Gram Sunday) - 4:14
9. "Jiga irlandesa" (Irish Jig) - 2:52 (cover of "Irish Jig" by Gwendal)
10. "El cantar de la Luna oscura" (The Singing of the Dark Moon) - 5:22
11. "Judas" (Judas) - 4:56
12. "La última cena" (The Last Supper) - 3:50
13. "Czardas" - 4:28
14. "El fin del camino" (The End of the Road) - 8:53

== Personnel ==
- José Andrëa: lead vocals, keyboards
- Mohamed: violin
- Carlitos: guitar
- Frank: guitar
- Salva: bass
- Txus: drums

=== Guests ===
- Mariano Muniesa: narrator in "Génesis"
- Amalia: viola in "Jesús de Chamberí" and "Hasta que tu muerte nos separe"
- Tony del Corral: sax on "Al-mejandría" and "Domingo de Gramos"
- Ramón Maroto: trumpet on "Al-mejandría" and "Domingo de Gramos"
- Óscar Cuenca: trombone on "Al-mejandría" and "Domingo de Gramos"
- Luis Guillén: backing vocals
- Joaquín Arellano "El niño": backing vocals
- César de Frutos "El Oso": backing vocals
- Oscar Sancho: backing vocals
