= Mägo de Oz (album) =

Studio album by Mägo de Oz
- Released: 1994
- Genre: Celtic Rock
- Length: 45:55
- Label: Locomotive Music
- Producer: Txus, Alberto Plaza

Mägo de Oz chronology
Mägo de Oz (1994)	Jesús de Chamberí (1996)

Mägo de Oz is the first studio album by the band Mägo de Oz.

Unlike their later metal-oriented works, this production has elements of jazz, blues, country and rock and roll, rhythms that are very different from the current ones and that prevailed in a couple of songs by Jesús de Chamberí.

The album initially was not very successful (no more than 150 copies sold in the first year), this caused the departure of Chema, Juanma and Tony in the following months.

== Track listing ==
No.	Title	Length
1.	"T'esnucaré contra'l bidé"	3:51
2.	"El Lago" ("The Lake")	4:29
3.	"Rock kaki rock"	3:14
4.	"Gerdundula" (Status Quo cover)	1:51
5.	"Lo que el viento se dejó" ("What the Wind Kept")	6:19
6.	"Yankees Go Home"	4:50
7.	"El hijo del blues" ("The Son of the Blues"; featuring Loch Lomond)	4:56
8.	"Nena" ("Girl")	4:00
9.	"Gimme Some Lovin'" (Spencer Davis Group cover)	3:09
10.	"Mago de Oz" ("Wizard of Oz")	9:16
Total length:		45:55

== Personnel ==
- Juanma: Voice
- Txus di Fellatio : Drums, Voice in "Gone with the Wind" and "Yankees go Home"
- Mohamed : Violin
- Tony Corral: Saxophone
- Carlitos : Rhythmic Guitar
- Chema: Solo Guitar
- Salva: Bass

=== Collaborations ===
- Francisco J. Urchegui: Trumpet in "T 'esnucaré contra'l bidet" and "Gimme some lovin"
- Manuel Villoria: Trombone in "T 'esnucaré contra'l bidé" and "Gimme some lovin"
- Miguel Mengual: Alto sax in "T 'esnucaré contra'l bidé" and "Gimme some lovin"
- Bob Sands: Tenor sax in "T 'esnucaré contra'l bidet" and "Gimme some lovin"
- Javier Iturralde: Baritone saxophone in "T 'esnucaré contra'l bidé"
- Josemi Redondo: Keyboards and piano in "Rock kaki rock", "Gone with the wind left" and "Mägo de Oz"
- Miguel: Harmonica in "Yankees go home" and "Nena"
- Eva: Choirs
- Pedro Gil: Choirs
- Enrique Gil: Choirs
- guitar
- guitar
- bass
