= La Leyenda de la Mancha =

Studio album by Mägo de Oz
- Released: 2 October 1998
- Genre: Folk metal
- Length: 55:42
- Label: Locomotive Music

Mägo de Oz chronology
Mägo de Oz (La Bruja) (1997)	La Leyenda de la Mancha (1998)	Finisterra (2000)

La Leyenda de La Mancha (The Legend of La Mancha) is the third studio album by Spanish folk metal band Mägo de Oz, released in 1998. It is a concept album, specifically a modern-day retelling of the Spanish classic Don Quixote. The song "Molinos de Viento" is one of Mägo de Oz's biggest hits and is often the concluding song in concerts.

== Track listing ==
1. En un Lugar... (In a Certain Village...) – 1:44
2. El Santo Grial (The Holy Grail) – 5:10
3. La Leyenda de la Mancha (The Legend of La Mancha) – 4:19
4. Noche Toledana (Night in Toledo) – 1:12
5. Molinos de Viento (Windmills) – 4:11
6. Dime Con Quién Andas (Tell Me Who You Are With) – 5:33
7. Maritornes – 4:20
8. El Bálsamo de Fierabrás (The Balm of Fierabrás) – 3:40
9. El Pacto (The Pact) – 5:43
10. La Ínsula de Barataria (The Island of Barataria) – 2:58
11. El Templo del Adiós (The Temple of Goodbye) [cover of "The Temple of the King" by Rainbow with Spanish lyrics] – 4:49
12. Réquiem – 8:10
13. Ancha es Castilla (Castile is Wide) – 3:45
