= Ilussia =

Studio album by Mägo de Oz
- Released: October 21, 2014
- Recorded: July 2014
- Genre: Folk metal; Celtic metal
- Length: 61:41
- Label: Warner Music, Spain

Mägo de Oz chronology
Hechizos, pócimas y brujería (2012)	Ilussia (2014)	Finisterra Opera Rock (2015)

Ilussia is the thirteenth studio album by the Spanish folk metal band Mägo de Oz. It was released on October 21, 2014, on Warner Music.

== Track listing ==
No.	Title	Length
1.	"Pensatorium"	7:02
2.	"Melodian"	4:07
3.	"Abracadabra"	3:48
4.	"Vuela alto ("Fly High")"	4:08
5.	"Si supieras... ("If You Only Knew...")"	5:48
6.	"Pasen y beban ("Come In And Have A Drink")"	5:27
7.	"Salvaje ("Wild")"	3:55
8.	"La viuda de O'Brian ("O'Brian's Widow")"	4:20
9.	"Cadaveria"	4:27
10.	"Constelación Alpha D.C.I. ("Constellation Alpha D.C.I")"	4:55
11.	"De la piel del diablo ("The Flesh of the Devil")"	4:40
12.	"Ilussia"	7:54
13.	"Moriré siendo de ti ("I'll Die Belonging to You")"	4:13
