= Standing My Ground =

Studio album by Clarence "Gatemouth" Brown
- Released: 1989
- Genre: Blues
- Label: Alligator
- Producer: Jim Bateman, Clarence Brown

Clarence "Gatemouth" Brown chronology
Hot Times Tonight (1989)	Standing My Ground (1989)	The Original Peacock Recordings (1990)

Standing My Ground is an album by the American musician Clarence "Gatemouth" Brown, released in 1989. Brown supported the album with a North American tour. Standing My Ground was nominated for a Grammy Award for Best Traditional Blues Recording.

== Production ==
Brown played guitar, piano, violin, and drums. He wrote seven of the album's songs. Terrance Simien contributed on accordion. "What Am I Living For" is a cover of the Chuck Willis song. As on other albums, Brown avoided songs in the Mississippi Delta blues style, considering them too loud and too negative. The album title refers in part to Brown's refusal to stick to certain musical genres despite pressures from record labels. "Born in Louisiana" is about life along the Louisiana-Texas border. "Cool Jazz" is an instrumental.

== Critical reception ==
Professional ratings
Review scores
Source	Rating
AllMusic	4/5 stars
Calgary Herald	B+
Chicago Tribune	3.5/4 stars
The Cincinnati Post	4/5 stars
The Encyclopedia of Popular Music	4/5 stars
The Grove Press Guide to the Blues on CD	4/5 stars
MusicHound Blues: The Essential Album Guide	3.5/5 stars
The Penguin Guide to Blues Recordings	2.5/4 stars
St. Petersburg Times	4/5 stars
Winston-Salem Journal	3/5 stars

The Chicago Tribune praised Brown's "one-of-a-kind technique: unrelentingly swinging, punctuated by playful, almost human-sounding cries and accents." The Calgary Herald deemed the album a "white-hot collection of blues and swing." The St. Petersburg Times concluded that "Standing My Ground offers ample evidence that Brown is a true American original who would be a major star in a society blind to barriers of both race and musical genres." The Winston-Salem Journal opined that it "rarely offers performances above the perfunctory and the expected."

The Ottawa Citizen noted that, "though he can't cover all the bases—a zydeco tune, 'Louisiana Zydeco' sounds stilted and forced—his haunting fiddle on 'What Am I Living For' is convincing and true to his roots." The Washington Post labeled Standing My Ground "a wonderfully effortless, eclectic and inspired piece of work." The Cincinnati Post admired the "fluid electric guitar" and considered the album to be one of Brown's best.

AllMusic called the album "a delightfully eclectic program spotlighting nearly all of Gate's musical leanings."

== Track listing ==
No.	Title	Length
1.	"Got My Mojo Working"
2.	"Born in Louisiana"
3.	"Cool Jazz"
4.	"I Hate These Doggone Blues"
5.	"She Walks Right In"
6.	"Leftover Blues"
7.	"Louisiana Zydeco"
8.	"What Am I Living For"
9.	"Never Unpack Your Suitcase"
