= Molinos de viento (Mägo de Oz song) =

"Molinos de viento (Live)"

Single by Mägo de Oz

from the album La Leyenda de la Mancha
- Released: 2002
- Genre: Folk metal
- Length: 4:13
- Songwriter(s): Txus di Fellatio

Mägo de Oz singles chronology
"La danza del fuego" (2001)	"Molinos de viento (Live)" (2002)	"La costa del silencio" (2003)

"Molinos de viento" ("Windmills") is a single from the Spanish folk metal group Mägo de Oz and is their most famous and widely known song. This track belongs to their 1998 album La Leyenda de la Mancha, but it was released as a single in 2002 from their live album Fölktergeist with the single "El lago".

This song talks about a conversation between Don Quixote and Sancho Panza, where the first reprehends the latter about his pessimism and his lack of belief. The actual conversation does not take place in the book. However, Don Quixote's idealism and Sancho's pessimism is a principal theme on it. The song is named after the adventure with the windmills (from the title of the song), where Don Quixote attacks the windmills that he believes to be giants.

In 2006, the group recorded the song again for their compilation album The Best Oz.

== Lyricist ==
- Txus di Fellatio (drummer)

== Musicians ==
- José Andrëa, vocals
- Carlitos, soloist guitar
- Frank, rhythmic guitar
- Salva, bass guitar
- Mohammed, violin
- Txus di Fellatio, drums
- Fernando Ponce de León, flute (Fölktergeist, The Best Oz)
- Sergio Cisneros, accordion (Fölktergeist, The Best Oz)
- Peri, bass guitar (The Best Oz)
- Jorge Salán, rhythmic and soloist guitar (The Best Oz)
