= Gaia II: La Voz Dormida =

Studio album by Mägo de Oz
- Released: 14 November 2005
- Genre: Folk metal
- Length: 1:48:53
- Label: Locomotive Music
- Producer: Big Simon

Mägo de Oz chronology
Madrid – Las Ventas (2005)	Gaia II: La Voz Dormida (2005)	Rock n' Oz (2006)

Gaia II: La Voz Dormida is a 2005 album by Spanish folk metal group Mägo de Oz. It is a continuation of Gaia, in which Azaak is captured by the Spanish Inquisition and awaits her execution.

The subtitle La voz dormida refers to a novel by Dulce Chacón about a group of women imprisoned during the Spanish Civil War.

== Disc one ==
1. "Volaverunt Opus 666" – 4:25
2. "La voz dormida" (The sleeping voice) (melody of first and second verses based on the chorus of the song "Guardians" from Helloween) – 9:58
3. "Hazme un sitio entre tu piel" (Make me a place in your skin) – 4:54
4. "El poema de la lluvia triste" (The poem of the sad rain) – 7:52
5. "El callejón del infierno" (Hell's alleyway) – 5:57
6. "El paseo de los tristes" (The walkway of the sad) – 5:20
7. "La posada de los muertos" (The inn of the dead) – 4:44
8. "Desde mi cielo" (From my heaven) – 6:20
9. "En nombre de Dios" (In the name of God) (melody based on "Gates of Babylon" by Rainbow) † - 7:04

† Special Edition CD release only.

== Disc two ==
1. "Incubos y súcubos" – 0:36 (Incubi and succubi)
2. "Diabulus in Música" – 4:44 (Diabolus in musica)
3. "Mañana empieza hoy" - 5:35 (Tomorrow begins today) [melody based on Hymn by Ultravox] †
4. "El Príncipe de la dulce pena" – 1:35 (The prince of the sweet sorrow)
5. "Aquelarre " – 9:03 (Coven)
6. "Hoy toca ser feliz " – 4:19 (Today we get to be happy) - music from Starman by David Bowie
7. "Creo (La Voz Dormida-Parte II)" – 5:15 (I believe (The sleeping voice part II))
8. "La Cantata del Diablo – Missit me Dominus" – 21:11 (The Devil's Cantata – Missit me Dominus) [includes an incrustation of "The Edge of Darkness" by Iron Maiden]

† Special Edition CD release only.

== Additional members ==
- Víctor García and Leo Jiménez – Additional vocals on "La Cantata del Diablo (Missit me dominus)"

== Sequel ==
- Gaia III: Atlantia
