= Gaia (Mägo de Oz album) =

Studio album by Mägo de Oz
- Released: 8 Sep 2003
- Genre: Folk metal
- Length: 72:25
- Label: Locomotive Music

Mägo de Oz chronology
Fölktergeist (2002)	Gaia (2003)	Belfast (2004)

Gaia is a 2003 album by Spanish folk metal band Mägo de Oz. It is the first rock opera of a trilogy. The album tells of a woman, the reincarnation of Azzak (or Gaia), who after her execution, is relieved of her soul: the soul of Azzak. Gaia, now free of her mortal skin, uses an e-mail to converse with the man who ordered her execution and tells him the story of Azzak and her affair in Colonial times. Upon his finishing the e-mail, she appears before him and it is left as a cliffhanger for Gaia II: La Voz Dormida to finish.

== Track listing ==
1. "Obertura MDXX" (Overture MDXX [1520]) 3:56
2. "Gaia" 11:04 (incorporating the 23rd Psalm and The Lord's Prayer)
3. "La Conquista" 5:08 (The Conquest)
4. "Alma" 6:42 (Soul)
5. "La Costa del Silencio" 4:41 (The Shore of Silence)
6. "El Árbol de la Noche Triste" 4:50 (The Night of Sorrows' Tree)
7. "La Rosa de los Vientos" 4:17 (The Compass Rose)
8. "La Leyenda de la Llorona" 4:22 (The Legend of La Llorona)
9. "Van a Rodar Cabezas" 6:32 (Heads Will Roll)
10. "El Atrapasueños" 4:17 (The Dreamcatcher)
11. "Si Te Vas" 6:00 (If You Leave)
12. "La Venganza de Gaia" 11:04 (Gaia's Vengeance)

=== DVD ===
1. "Introducción
2. "Gaia y su concepto
3. "El álbum y su proceso
4. "Canción a canción
5. "La sesión de fotos
6. "La grabación del vídeo-clip
7. "El diseño gráfico
8. "La Costa del Silencio (Video)
9. "Créditos

== Story of Gaia ==
The album comes with a novella that narrates the story behind every song.

Obertura MDXX: It introduces the story with an orchestral melody set with the sound of the sea and the Spanish ships traveling to the New World.

Gaia: Set in 2003, it tells the last moments of the life of Alma Echegaray, who has been unjustly sentenced to die on the electric chair by Georgia's governor, Joe Hamilton. She asks herself why has this happened, since she never hated anyone before. This traumatic event leads her soul to seek for revenge.

La Conquista: When returning home after the execution, Joe Hamilton receives an e-mail sent by Alma herself, in which she tells him a story dating back to the year 1500. This song is the beginning of that e-mail, narrating the journey by sea of Hernan Cortés's army and their arrival to Mexico's shores, as well as the fear that the natives felt when they saw white men coming to their lands in strange floating wooden mountains. One of the main characters in the story is introduced, Pedro de Alcázar, a soldier in Cortés's army. He begins to realize the evil that will fall over the people they'll find on this New World, all in order to take their gold and their lands.

Alma: The song introduces another main character, Azaak, an 18-year-old native made prisoner by the Spaniards, who imprisoned any woman capable of giving birth. When Pedro sees her for the first time, he's captivated by her beauty; in that moment she is surrounded by a group of old women crying their hearts out. Pedro asks Azaak about them, and she shows him a litter made of leaves with a 4-year-old lying sick there. After that, the old women start a song in order to save the child's soul.

La Costa del Silencio: In this song, Azaak tells that for every evil against the sea and against Mother Nature, we'll be punished by her [Mother Nature] because of our (Humanity) actions. Azaak foretells that in many years, when the humans no longer need the wind to travel by sea, a big catastrophe will happen in a place called Galicia.

El Arbol de la Noche Triste: The lyrics address Hernán Cortés directly, criticizing his arrogance and the bloodshed committed in the name of the Spanish Crown. The tree reminds him of his defeat and suggest that the pain and tears of history should serve as a lesson: never to enslave human beings and to respect the planet.

La Rosa de los Vientos:Txus gifted this song to Juan Antonio Cebrián, a journalist and radio broadcaster, in honor of his famous late-night radio program, La rosa de los vientos. aired on Onda Cero. It isn't related to the story.

La Leyenda de la Llorona: Its name refers to "La Llorona", a popular legend in Latin America, this song focuses on the instruments rather than singing, it does, however, have lyrics, just very occasionally.
