= Stepa (band) =

American nu metal band

- Also known as: Phlip (1998–2001)
- Origin: Thousand Oaks, California
- Genre: Nu metal
- Years active: 1998–2003, 2022–present
- Labels: Locomotive Music; Interscope Records
- Members: Blake Beckmann; Jesse Krapff; Brendon Oates; Ian Corabi; Jay Frederick
- Past members: Chaz Kindschi; Mark Thorley; Shane Swayney

Stepa is an American nu metal band from Thousand Oaks, California, that was active from 1998 to 2003, and again starting in 2022. The band was formed in 1998 as Phlip. Under that name, the band recorded a few demos. In 2001, Phlip renamed to Stepa and the group released their self-titled debut album through Locomotive Music on July 30, 2002.

The band toured with Locomotive labelmates Medication in 2002. In 2003, vocalist Blake Beckman and DJ Chaz Kindschi left the band. A three song demo called Teenage Funeral was released in 2003, containing songs that were supposed to appear on their scrapped second album. Teenage Funeral is the only release not to feature Blake Beckmann. The group disbanded in 2003 after the departure of guitarist Shane Swayney. Beckmann went on to front the alternative rock band Fermata and his solo project ...And the Fixation.

In August 2022, it was announced that the band had reunited and was working on their second album. On October 10, 2025, the album entitled "Icarus Flight" was released. To commemorate the release, they played their first show since 2003 at Tarantula Hill Brewing Co. in Thousand Oaks.

== Debut album ==
The band's debut album was a self titled release on Locomotive Music, which was released 30 July 2002. The album was produced by Scott Gaines, and Jay Baumgardner, with additional songwriting contributions from Mark Renk. Scott Borland, brother of Limp Bizkit guitarist Wes Borland, contributed additional keyboards to the album. The songs "Aquarium" and "Spaceships And Airplanes" were released as singles, despite plans of making music videos for both songs, only "Spaceships And Airplanes" got a music video.

== Lineup ==
Current members

- Blake Beckmann – lead vocals (1998–2003, 2022–present)
- Brendon Oates – guitar (1998–2003, 2022–present)
- Jesse Krapff – bass (1998–2003, 2022–present)
- Ian Corabi – drums (2024–present)
- Jay Frederick – guitar (2024–present)

Former members

- Chaz Kindschi – turntables, keyboards, programming (1998–2003; died 2022)
- Mark Thorley – drums (1998–2003, 2022–2024)
- Shane Swayney – guitar, backing vocals (2002–2003, 2022–2024); lead vocals (2003)

== Discography ==
=== Studio albums ===
- Stepa (2002, Locomotive Music)
- Icarus Flight (2025)

=== Singles ===
- Aquarium (2002)
- Spaceships and Airplanes (2003)
- Wish / Avalanches (2024)
- fall awake (2024)
- Idiot Summer (2025)
- Mechanical (2025)

=== Other ===
- 3 Song Demo (2003)
- Teenage Funeral (2003, demo)
