= No Looking Back (Clarence Gatemouth Brown album) =

Studio album by Clarence "Gatemouth" Brown
- Released: 1992
- Genre: Blues, Texas blues
- Label: Alligator
- Producer: Jim Bateman, Clarence "Gatemouth" Brown

Clarence "Gatemouth" Brown chronology
The Original Peacock Recordings (1990)	No Looking Back (1992)	Just Got Lucky (1993)

No Looking Back is an album by the American musician Clarence "Gatemouth" Brown, released in 1992. Brown supported the album with a North American tour.

The album was nominated for a Grammy Award for "Best Traditional Blues Album".

== Production ==
The album was produced by Jim Bateman and Brown. Brown included four instrumental tracks and played fiddle as well as guitar. Michelle Shocked duetted with Brown on "I Will Be Your Friend". "Better Off With the Blues" is a cover of the Delbert McClinton song; "C-Jam Blues" is a version of the Duke Ellington composition. "Alligator Eating Dog" is a novelty song that includes sound effects.

== Critical reception ==
Professional ratings
Review scores
Source	Rating
AllMusic	3/5 stars
The Encyclopedia of Popular Music	3/5 stars
Los Angeles Daily News	4/4 stars
The Republican	3.5/5 stars

The Chicago Tribune wrote: "Lively Texas jump blues (fleshed out by a hot big-band-styled horn section and Brown's delightfully idiosyncratic guitar and violin work) is at the heart of the album, but the always eclectic Brown mixes it up with some sweet slow blues, a bit of funk, even a country ballad." The Telegram & Gazette stated that the album "features fleet-fingered jazzy blues solos and pungent country-flavored riffs over a swinging horn section."

Guitar Player called Brown "a master arranger [who] writes horn parts that add texture, melody, and excitement." The Pittsburgh Post-Gazette determined that Brown's "eclectic music is firmly planted in Texas swing blues, but still manages some magical meandering."

AllMusic wrote that "Brown's vocals, which feature consistently intelligent lyrics ... are part of the music rather than the entire show; he even gives his obscure backup horns chances to solo."

== Track listing ==
No.	Title	Length
1.	"Better Off with the Blues"
2.	"Digging New Ground"
3.	"Dope"
4.	"My Own Prison"
5.	"Stop Time"
6.	"C-Jam Blues"
7.	"Straighten Up"
8.	"The Peeper"
9.	"Alligator Eating Dog"
10.	"I Will Be Your Friend"
11.	"We're Outta Here"
