= Locomotive Music =

- Founded: 1997
- Founder: Gregorio Esteban
- Genre: Hard rock, heavy metal, progressive metal, punk rock
- Country of origin: Spain
- Location: Villaviciosa de Odón, Madrid
- Official website: www.locomotiverecords.com^{[usurped]}

Locomotive Music or Locomotive Records is an independent record label based in Spain. The label's music catalogue was acquired by One Media iP on 25 February 2019.

== Selected artists ==
- Adagio
- Alogia
- Anubis Gate
- Astral Doors
- Barón Rojo
- Before the Dawn
- Benedictum
- Blood Stain Child
- Crystallion
- The Diamond Dogs
- Doro
- Elegy
- Eminence
- Figure Of Six
- Grave Digger
- Grenouer
- Hamlet
- José Andrëa
- Lanfear
- Los Suaves
- Maeder
- Mägo de Oz
- Medication
- Prong
- Randy Piper's Animal
- Sex Museum
- Spider Rockets
- Stormlord
- Stepa
- Stryper
- Tierra Santa
- Wuthering Heights

== See also ==
- List of record labels
