= Sonorama Ribera =

Music festival in Spain

Coordinates: 41.6679°N 3.7004°W

Sonorama Ribera Festival
- Genre: Indie pop, indie rock, electronic music
- Dates: mid-August (4 days)
- Locations: Aranda de Duero, Castile and León, Spain
- Years active: 14 (since 1998)
- Website: www.sonorama-aranda.com

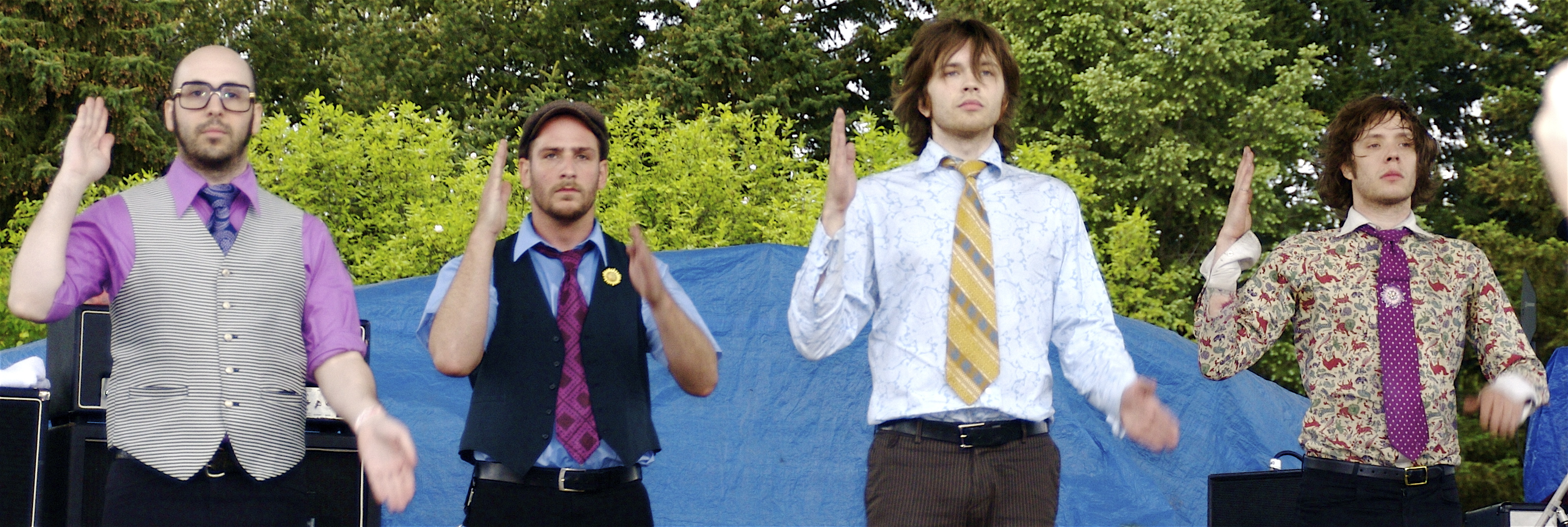
Ok Go, the New York City band, performed at the Sonorama Festival in 2006.

The Sonorama Festival (since 2008 Sonorama-Ribera) is an annual music festival which takes place in the city of Aranda de Duero, in Castile and León (Spain), since 1998. It is organized by the cultural association and non-profit Art de Troya, in mid-August each year. The lineup mainly consists of indie pop, indie rock, and electronic music.

With a progressive growth, it has become one of the biggest summer festivals in Spain, and it is broadcast live on Spanish National Radio: Radio 3. In 2010, it was voted the third-best Spanish festival by the readers of the magazine Rockdelux, and as fourth-best Spanish festival by magazine Mondosonoro. Also, it has been nominated for the Independent Music Awards, organized by the Unión Fonográfica Independiente, in the category of Best Music Festival in Spain in 2010 and in 2012.

The festival is also composed of other activities:

- Sonorama Festival of Short Films, since 2000
- Music demo contest
- Visit and lunch in the old underground wineries of Aranda de Duero, with Ribera del Duero wine
- Wine tasting courses
- Tourist Route: Ruta del Vino (Wine´s Route)
- Conferences
- Sonorama Kids, a show specially designed for children, since 2011

During all 14 editions, the festival has had an international character, but mainly it focuses on the Spanish music scene. In its last edition, in 2011, more than 40,000 people attended the 4-day festival.

== Sonorama's influence on the Spanish music scene ==
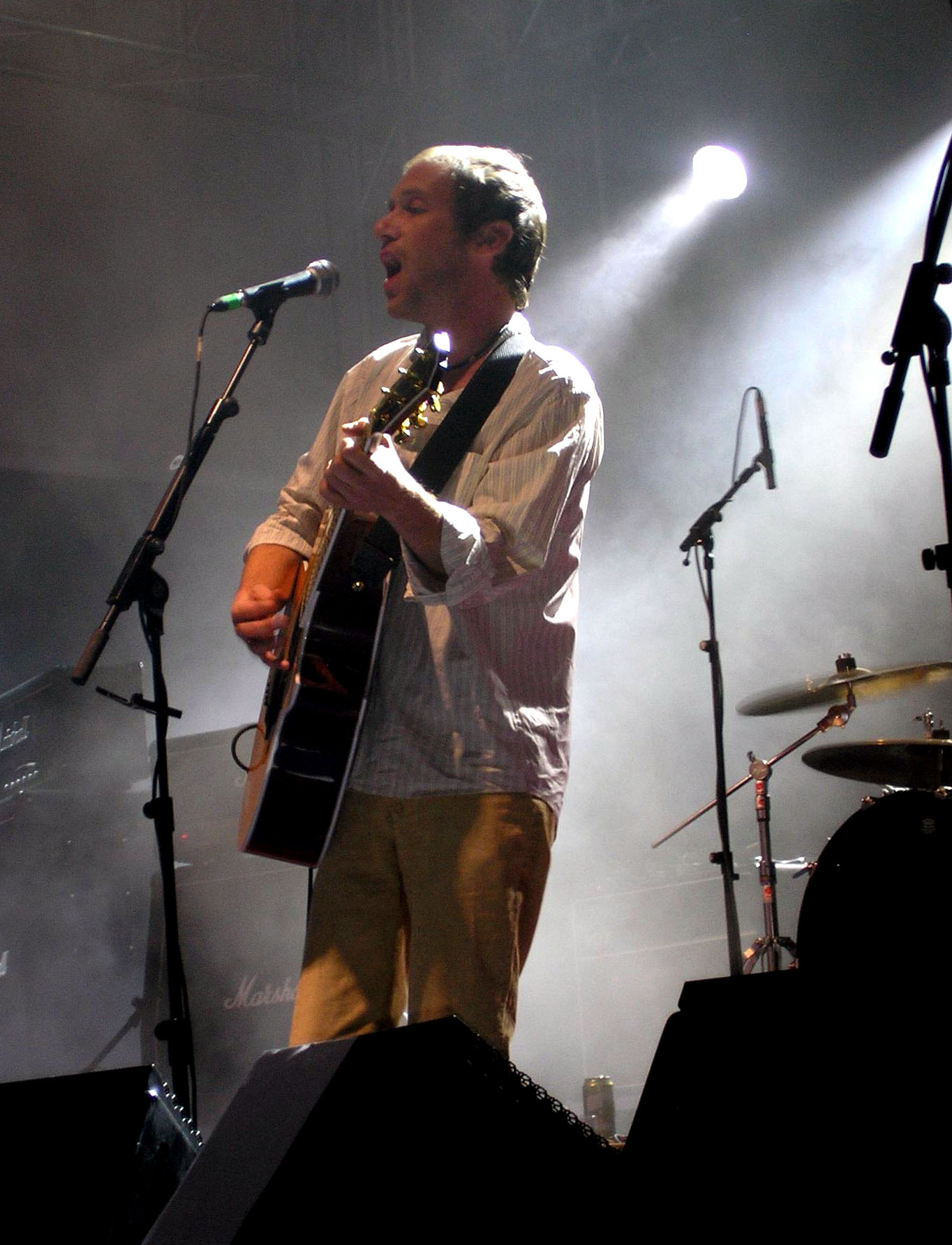
Ocean Colour Scene, the Birmingham band, performed at the Sonorama Festival in 2005.

Over the years the Festival Sonorama has become a launching point for Spanish indie pop groups. Although its stages have featured nearly all the big bands in the indie scene since it began, it has now opted for new names and emerging bands. In 2000 it already had names like Los Planetas and Digital 21. In 2001 and 2002 Deluxe and Ellos played, in 2003 Second, and in 2005 The Sunday Drivers.

In 2007 concerts began in the city centre during the morning. Since then the Plaza del Trigo stage has become an emblematic scenario and confirmation of a group as an "indie" national band. This also happened in 2008 with Vetusta Morla, and most recently in 2010 with Supersubmarina.

The festival is not only important as a driver for new talent, it is also known as a farewell venue for national groups. In 2005, the Catalan band Mercromina said goodbye at the festival. On that occasion each national band that performed at the festival paid tribute to the band by playing at least one of their songs.

The festival caters not only to indie rock and pop. Sometimes accompanied by controversy, Sonorama has diversified into other styles and musical environments, from the singer-songwriter Bebe to the hip hop of La Mala Rodriguez to the electropop/hard rock of Dover. Even in 2007 Nacha Pop launched their comeback with a performance at Sonorama.

== Bands who have played the festival ==
During its 20 years, several famous bands have performed at Sonorama, including Mogwai, !!!, Ocean Colour Scene, OK Go, Yeah Yeah Yeahs, The Rentals, Asian Dub Foundation, Ash, Gogol Bordello, Nada Surf, Amy Macdonald, James, The Sounds, The Ettes, Brett Anderson, Molotov, Ecologist, Rinôçérôse, The Hidden Cameras, Los Campesinos!, Shout Out Louds, Teenage Fanclub, The Raveonettes, The Dandy Warhols, Kakkmaddafakka, The Primitives, Travis, Belle and Sebastian, Cut Copy, Mando Diao and The Hives.

== Lineups ==
=== 2008 Festival ===
Headliners

- Gogol Bordello (United States)
- Nada Surf (United States)
- Vetusta Morla
- Sidonie
- Iván Ferreiro
- Deluxe
- Josele Santiago
- Dinero
- Russian Red
- Triángulo de Amor Bizarro
- Love of Lesbian
- Quique González
- Jet Lag
- El Columpio Asesino
- Lagartija Nick
- Najwajean: Najwa Nimri+Carlos Jean
- Lori Meyers
- ...

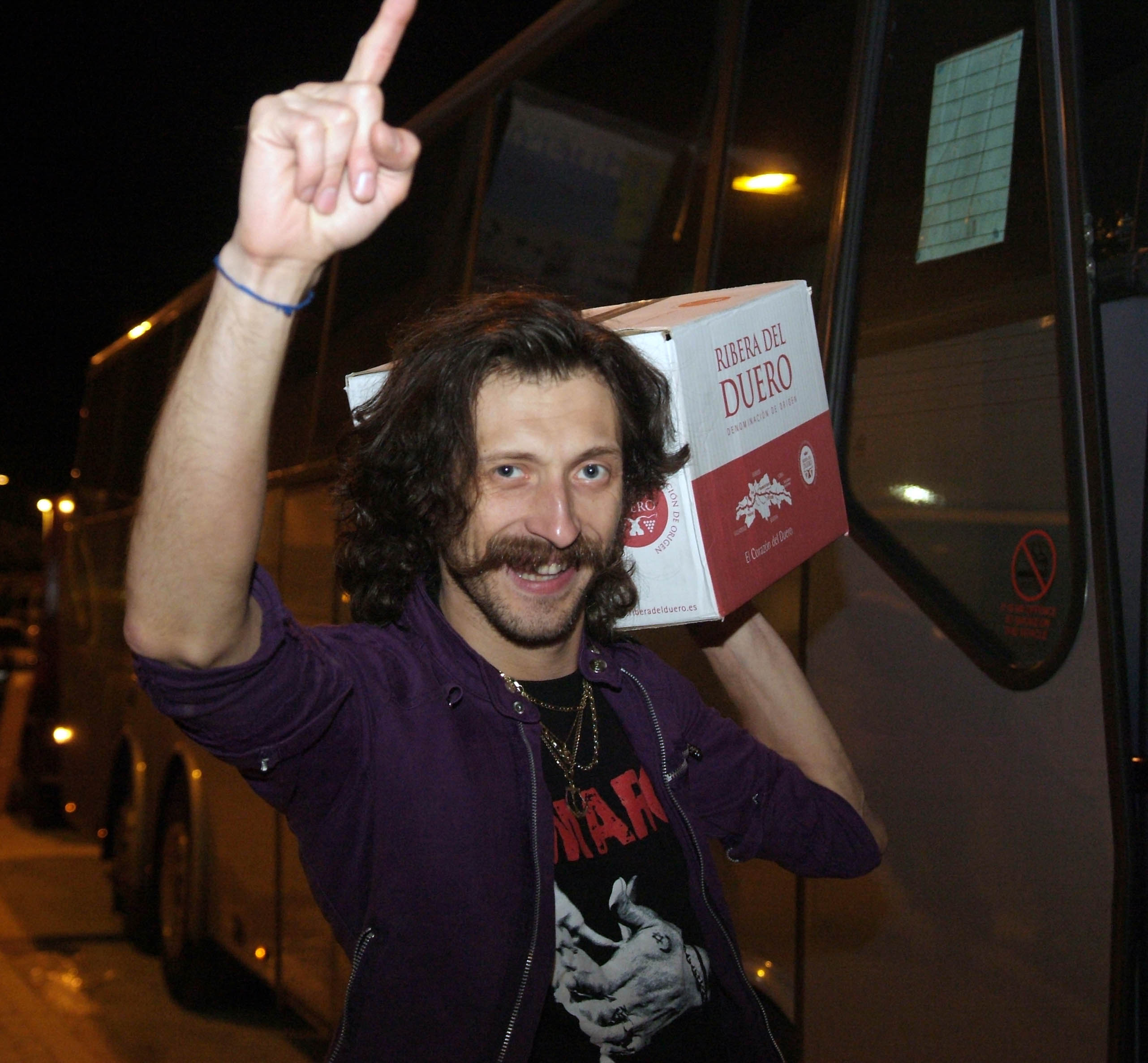
Eugene Hütz, lead singer of New York City Gypsy punk band Gogol Bordello, just before his performance in Sonorama 2008

=== 2009 Festival ===
Headliners

- Amy Macdonald (Scotland)
- James (England)
- Infadels (England)
- Josh Rouse (United States)
- Vetusta Morla
- Christina Rosenvinge
- Kiko Veneno
- The Unfinished Sympathy
- DIGITAL 21
- Los Coronas
- Anni B Sweet
- Ojo con la Mala (La Mala Rodríguez)
- The Sunday Drivers
- Nacho Vegas
- Dorian
- Lagartija Nick
- Second
- Catpeople
- La Habitación Roja
- Jugoplastika
- Arizona Baby
- ...

=== 2010 Festival ===
Headliners

- Brett Anderson (UK)
- The Sounds (Sweden)
- The Pains of Being Pure at Heart (United States)
- The Ettes (United States)
- The Raveonettes (Denmark)
- Los Planetas
- Loquillo
- Shuarma
- Love of Lesbian
- Vinila von Bismark
- Lori Meyers
- Sidonie
- Delorean
- Los Coronas,...

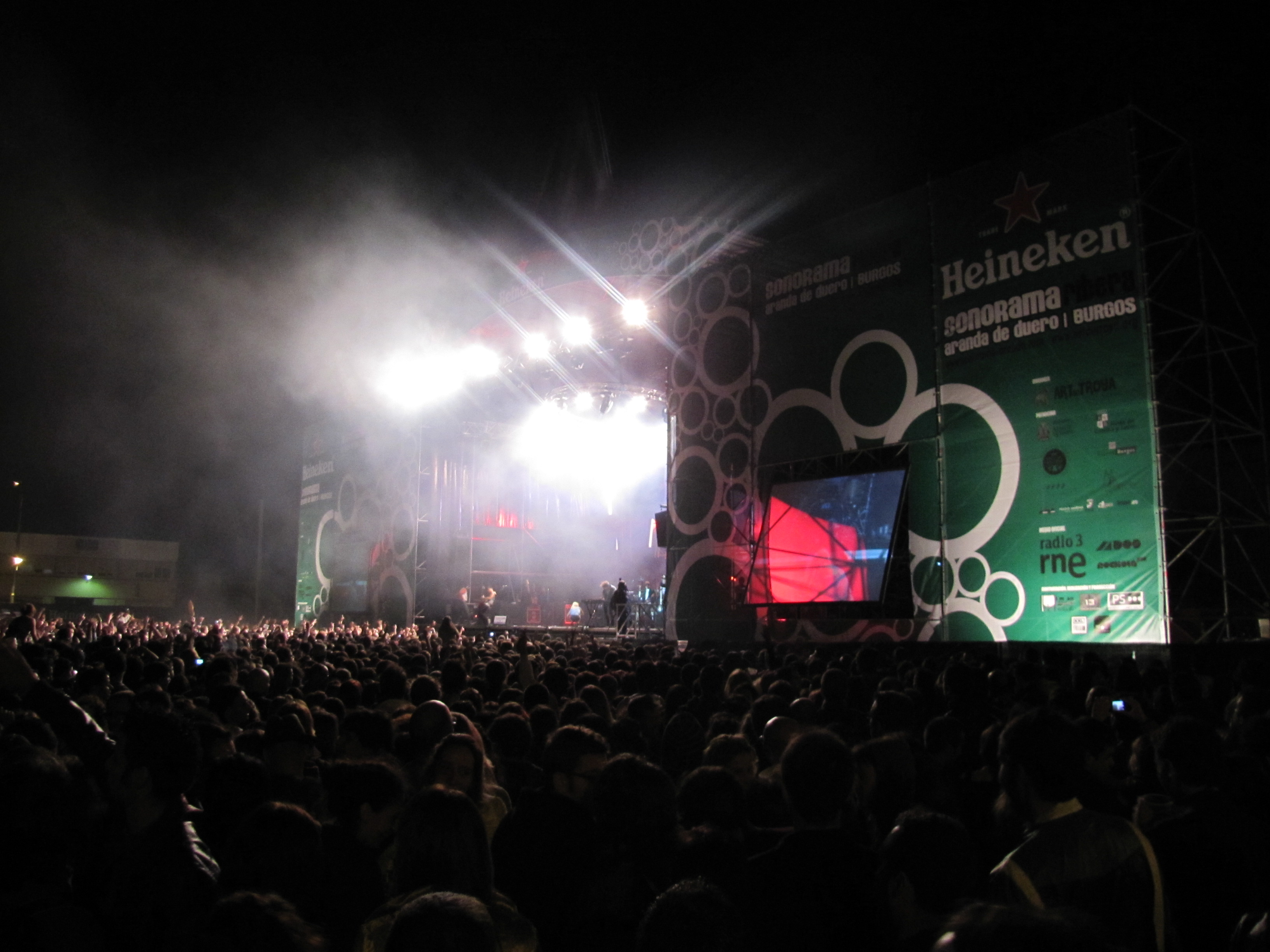
The Sounds in its performance in Sonorama 2010

=== 2011 Festival ===
During the 2011 edition, more than 100 bands performed and 40,000 people attended the 4-day festival. A new activity just for children, Sonorama Kids, was set up.

Headliners

- Rinôçérôse (France)
- Teenage Fanclub (Scotland)
- The Hidden Cameras (Canada)
- Los Campesinos! (Wales)
- Shout Out Louds (Sweden)
- Amaral
- Cycle
- Delorean
- Dorian
- Ellos
- Iván Ferreiro
- La Frontera
- La Habitación Roja
- Nacho Vegas
- Sexy Sadie
- Supersubmarina
- Coque Malla
- Triángulo de Amor Bizarro
- El Guincho
- Catpeople
- El Columpio Asesino
- Xoel López
- Dos Bandas y un destino (Los Coronas + Arizona Baby), with Curro Savoy
- La Orquesta Poligonera (Iván Ferreiro + Coque Malla + Anni B Sweet + ...)

=== 2012 Festival ===
Dates: 9, 10, 11, August 12.

Headliners

- The Dandy Warhols (United States)
- Sunshine Brothers (Australia)
- The Gift (Portugal)
- The Primitives (England)
- Instituto Mexicano del Sonido (Mexico)
- Vetusta Morla
- Love of lesbian
- Odio París
- Lüger
- Maga
- Cooper
- Fuel Fandango
- Sidonie
- Jero Romero (The Sunday Drivers)
- The Zombie Kids
- Calle 13 (Puerto Rico)
- Kakkmaddafakka (Norway)
- Gaoler's Daughter (England)
- M. Alfonso (Cuba)
- El Columpio Asesino
- We Are Standard
- Los Enemigos
- La Casa Azul
- Russian Red
- Corizonas (Los Coronas + Arizona Baby)
- Dinero
- The Cabriolets (Bimba Bosé)
- Anni B Sweet
- Napoleón Solo
- ...

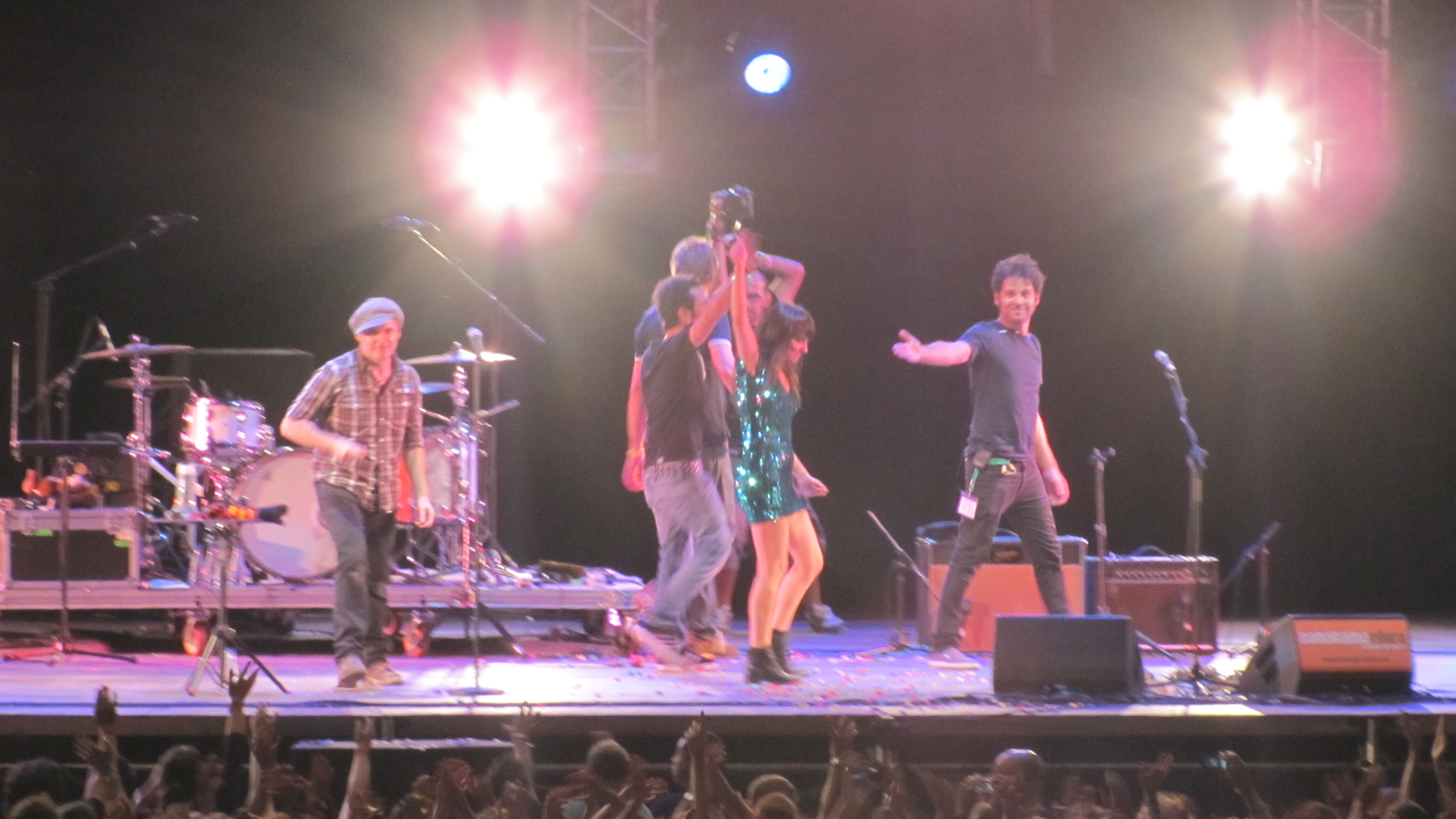
Amaral in its performance in Sonorama 2011

=== Sonorama 2013 ===
Dates: 14, 15, 16, August 17.

Headliners

- Travis (Scotland)
- Belle and Sebastian (Scotland)
- Supersubmarina
- Standstill presents Cenit
- Jaime Urrutia
- Havalina
- Xoel López
- Jero Romero
- Esterotypo
- Delafé y las flores azules
- L. A.
- ...
- Lori Meyers
- Soleá Morente y los evangelistas
- Mendetz
- Izal
- Miss Caffeina
- Triángulo de Amor Bizarro
- Capsula
- Pony Bravo
- The New Raemon & Maga
- Loquillo & Amigos
- Eme Dj
- León Benavente
- DUNE (band)

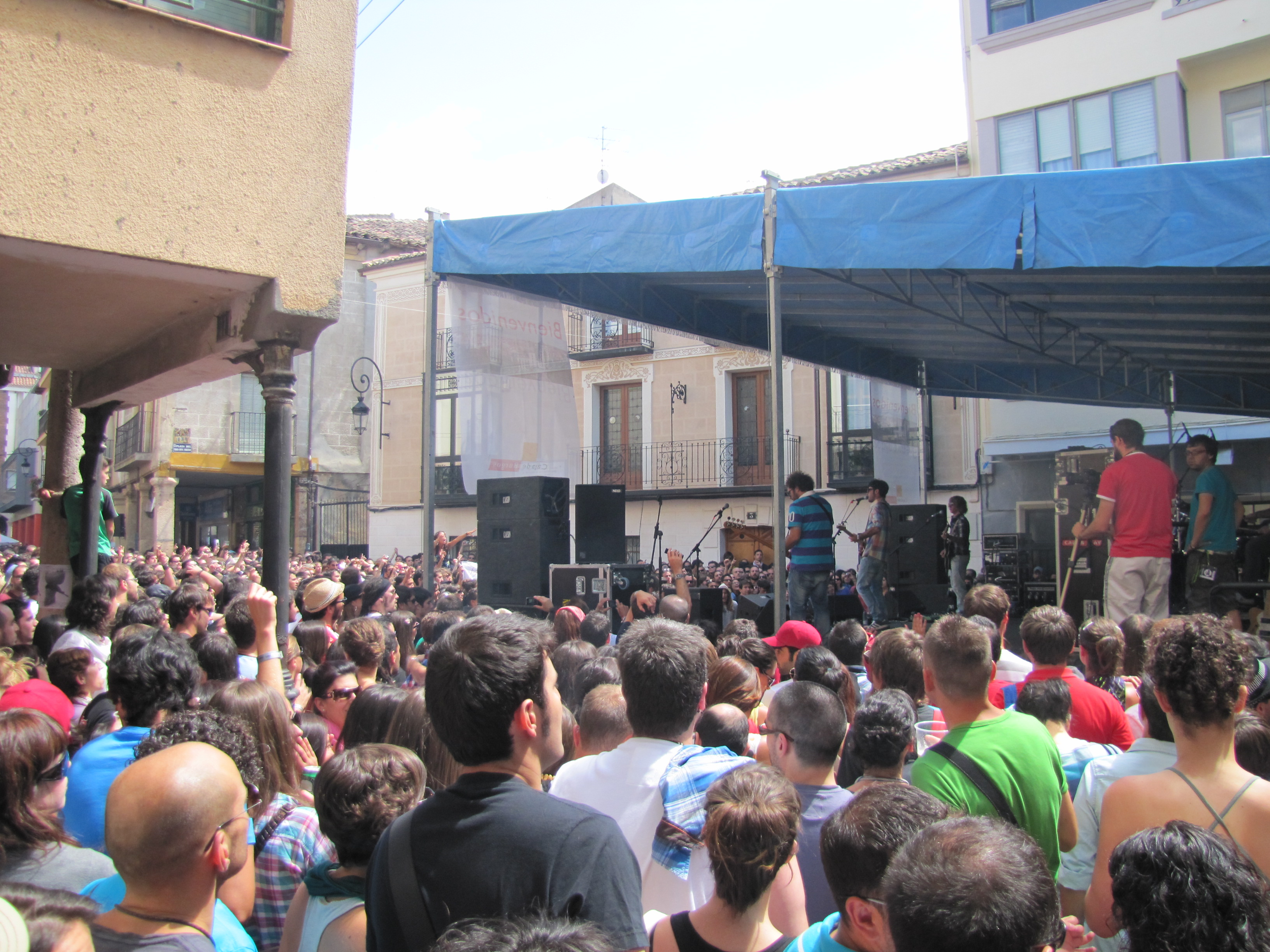
Supersubmarina in its performance in Sonorama 2011

=== Sonorama 2014 ===
Dates: August 13, 14, 15 & 16

Headliners

- Cut Copy (Australia)
- David Fonseca (Portugal)
- Reptile Youth (Denmark)
- Los Planetas
- Raphael
- Iván Ferreiro
- Niños Mutantes
- We Are Standard, plays The Clash
- Amaral
- Fuel Fandango
- Izal
- Second con Sinfónica2502
- ...
- Exsonvaldes (France)
- The Corner (Canada)
- Jay Malinowski (Canada)
- Duncan Dhu
- El Columpio Asesino
- Cosmic Birds
- Nacho Vegas
- Depedro
- Elefantes
- León Benavente
- Najwa Nimri
- Tachenko

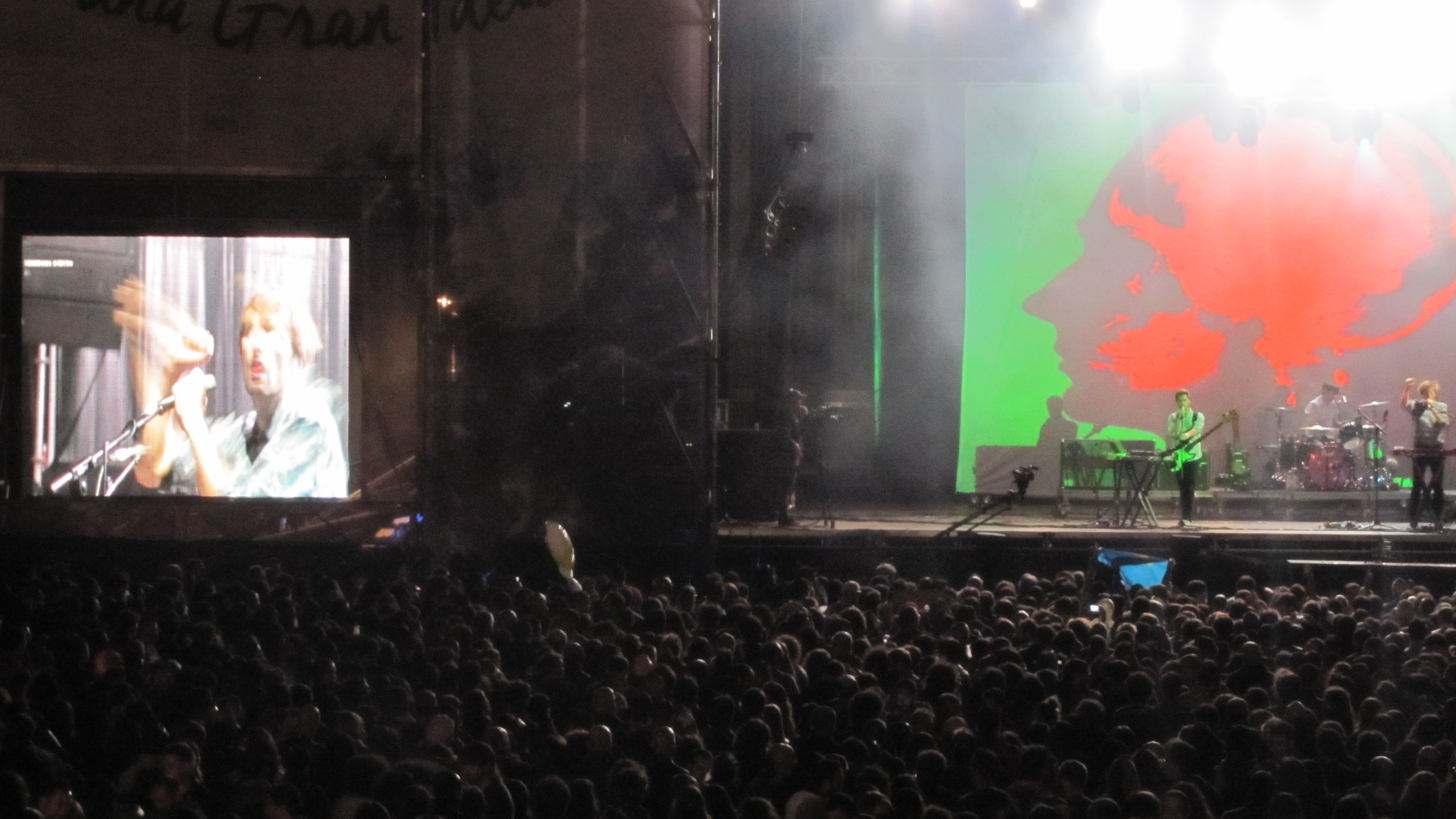
Cut Copy in its performance in Sonorama 2014

=== Sonorama 2015 ===
Dates: mid-August (4 days)

Headliners

- Anna Calvi (England)
- Calexico (United States)
- Monarchy (England)
- Vetusta Morla
- Australian Blonde (only performance in festivals 2015)
- Supersubmarina
- Sidonie
- Vive Morente (Estrella Morente + Soleá Morente + Los Evangelistas: Jota (Los Planetas) + Eric Jiménez + Florent Muñoz + Antonio Arias (Lagartija Nick))
- Arizona Baby
- Bigott
- Marlango
- Lichis
- Sexy Zebras
- Fetén Fetén with Mastretta
- Grupo de Expertos Solynieve
- La M.O.D.A.
- Clap Your Hands Say Yeah (United States)
- The Royal Concept (Sweden)
- 2ManyDJs (Belgium)
- Carlos Jean
- Mi Capitán
- Toundra
- Xoél López
- Dinero
- Dorian
- Jero Romero
- Miguel Campello
- La Habitación Roja
- Joe Crepúsculo
- Ángel Stanich
- Rufus T. Firefly
- Toreros Muertos
- Aerolíneas Federales
- ...

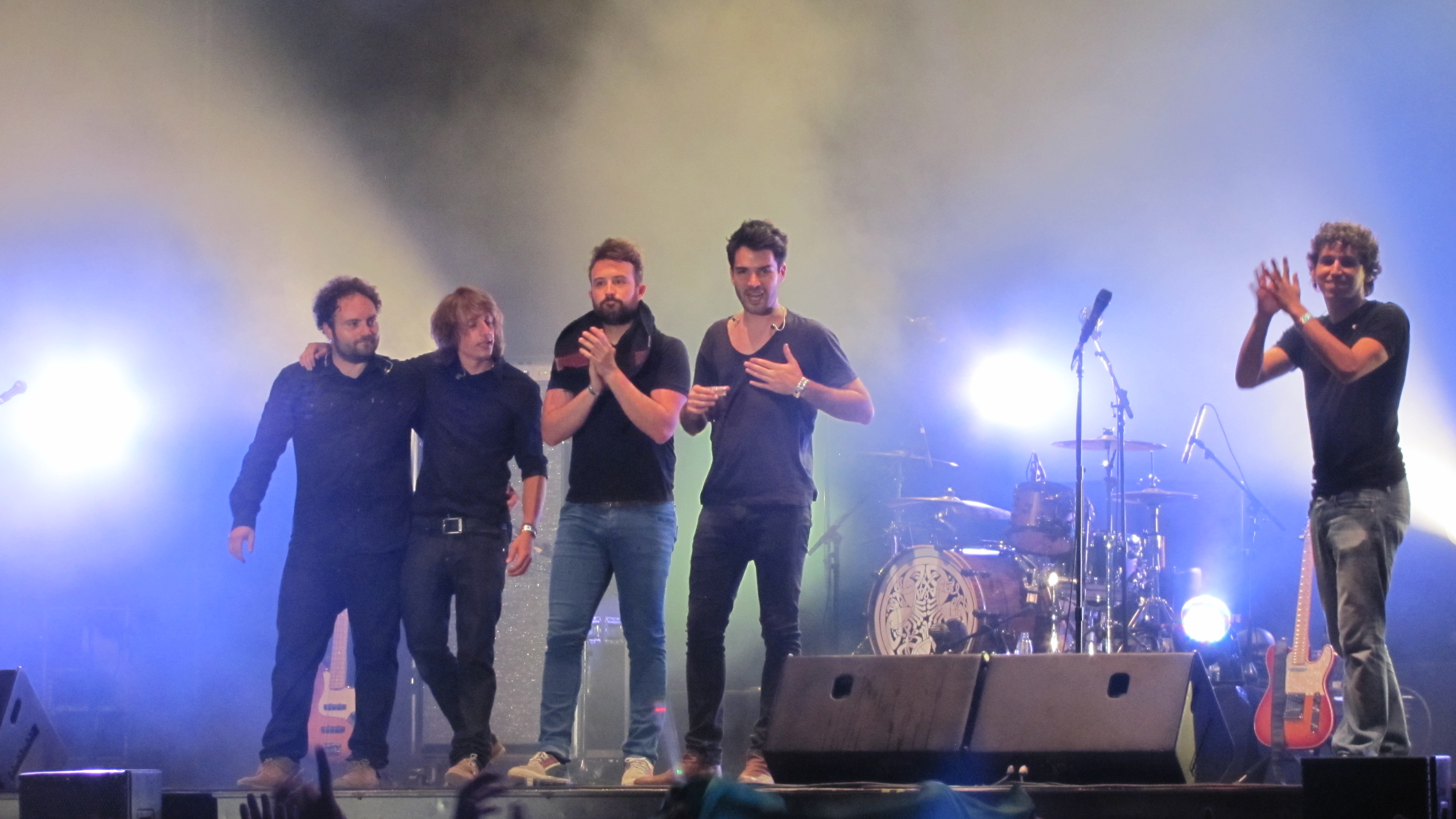
Supersubmarina in its performance in Sonorama 2013

=== Sonorama 2016 ===
Dates: August 10–14 (5 days)

Headliners

- Mando Diao (Sweden)
- Cycle (New Zealand / Spain)
- Kula Shaker (England)
- Javiera Mena (Chile)
- Izal
- Sidecars
- Ellos
- Luis Brea y el miedo
- Maga
- Mucho
- Perro
- Señores
- Carlos Sadness
- Egon Soda
- Elyella Dj's
- Micky y los colosos del ritmo
- Miss Caffeina
- Nudo Zurdo
- Niño de Elche
- Triángulo de Amor Bizarro
- The Hives (Sweden)
- Molotov (Mexico)
- Exsonvaldes (France)
- Digital XXI + Stefan Olsdal (Sweden / Spain)
- Dúo Dinámico
- Love of Lesbian
- Second
- Fuel Fandango
- 091
- Quique González & Los Detectives
- León Benavente
- Alex Cooper
- Corizonas
- Cycle
- Delorean
- Ángel Stanich
- L.A.
- La Frontera
- Manel
- Belako
- ...

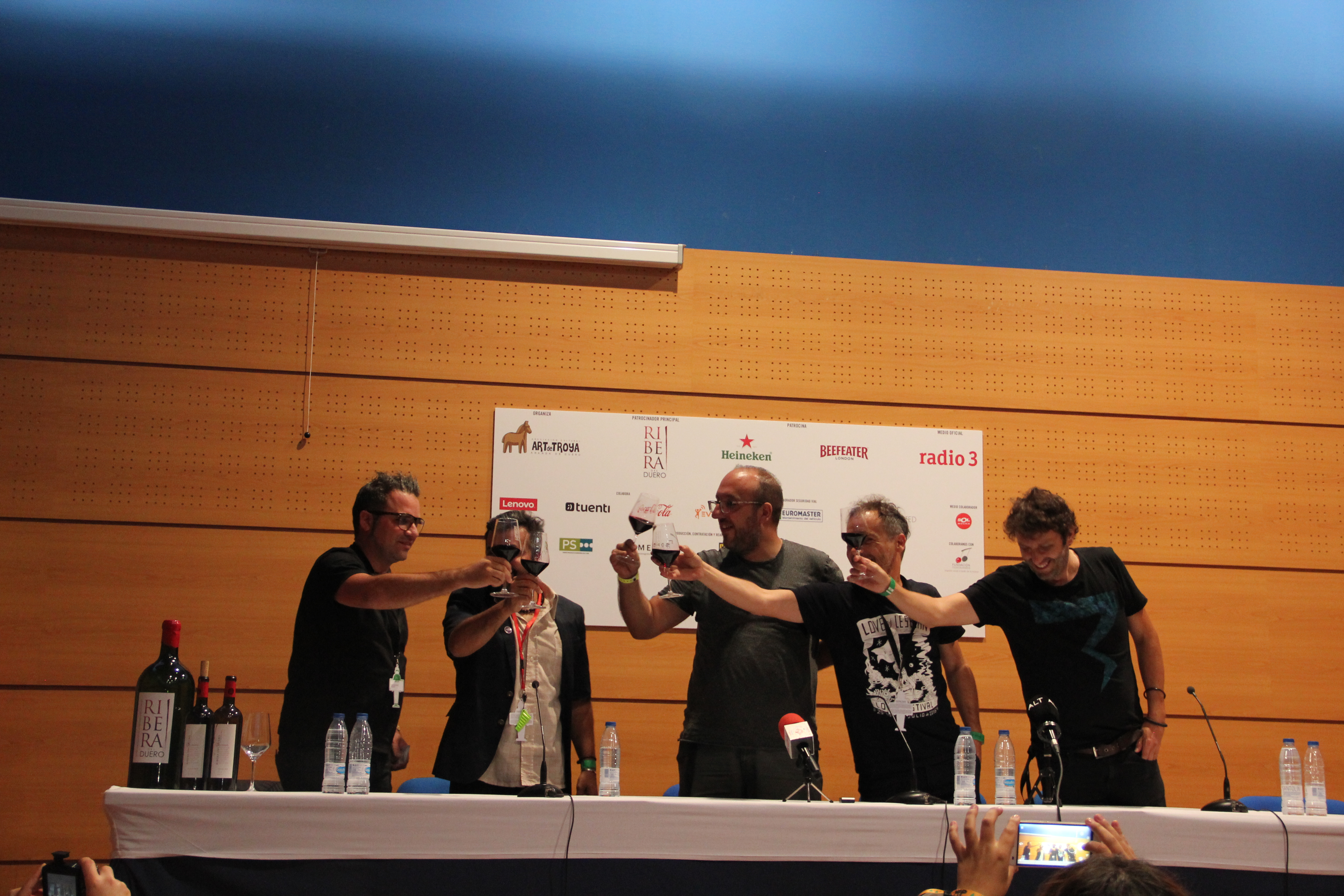
News conference from Love of Lesbian during Sonorama 2016

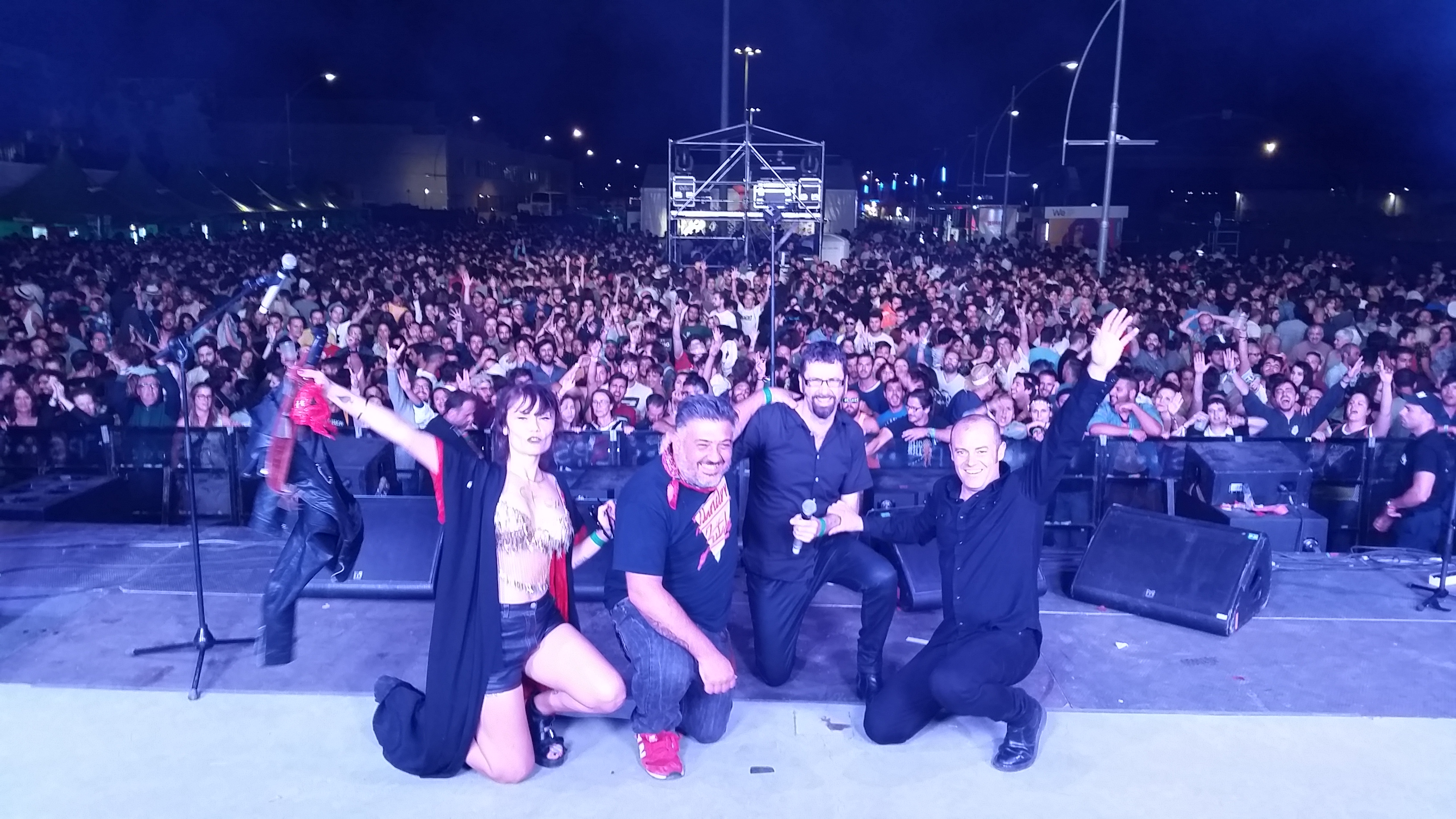
Cycle in its performance in Sonorama 2016

=== Sonorama 2019 ===
Dates: August 7–11 (5 days)

Headliners

- Love of Lesbian
- Miss Caffeina
- Kitai
- Orquesta Mondragón
- La Sonrisa de Julia
- Zahara
- Deacon Blue (Scotland)
- Carlos Sadness
- Depedro
- Shinova
- Tote King
- Grises
- ...

=== Sonorama 2020 ===
- Emir Kusturica
- Kaiser Chiefs
- Amaral
- Viva Suecia
- Loquillo
- Sidonie
- Celtas Cortos
- Def con Dos
- Manel
- Belako
- Nach
- Monarchy
- Javiera Mena
- Coque Malla
- Leiva
- Delaporte
- Derby Motoreta’s Burrito Kachimba
- La Casa Azul
- León Benavente
- Novedades Carminha
- La Habitación Roja

=== Sonorama 2021 ===
- Estereobrothers
- We Are Not Dj's
- Cala Veto
- El Kanka
- Los Zigarros
- Nach
- Sidonie
- Viva Suecia
- Ley Dj
- Amaral
- Anni B. Sweet
- Arde Bogotá
- Delaporte
- Derby Motoreta’s Burrito Kachimba
- León Benavente
- María de Juan
- Queralt La Hoz
- We Are Not Dj's
- Amable Dj
- Comandante Twin
- Ginebras
- Jack Bisonte
- La Habitación Roja
- La La Love You
- Lucia Tacheti
- Varry Brava
- Vetusta Morla
