= Sonorama 2015 =

Music festival in Spain

Coordinates: 41.6679°N 3.7004°W

Sonorama Ribera Festival
- Genre: Indie pop, indie rock, electronic music
- Dates: August 12–15
- Locations: Aranda de Duero, Castile and León, Spain
- Years active: 18 (since 1998)
- Website: www.sonorama-aranda.com

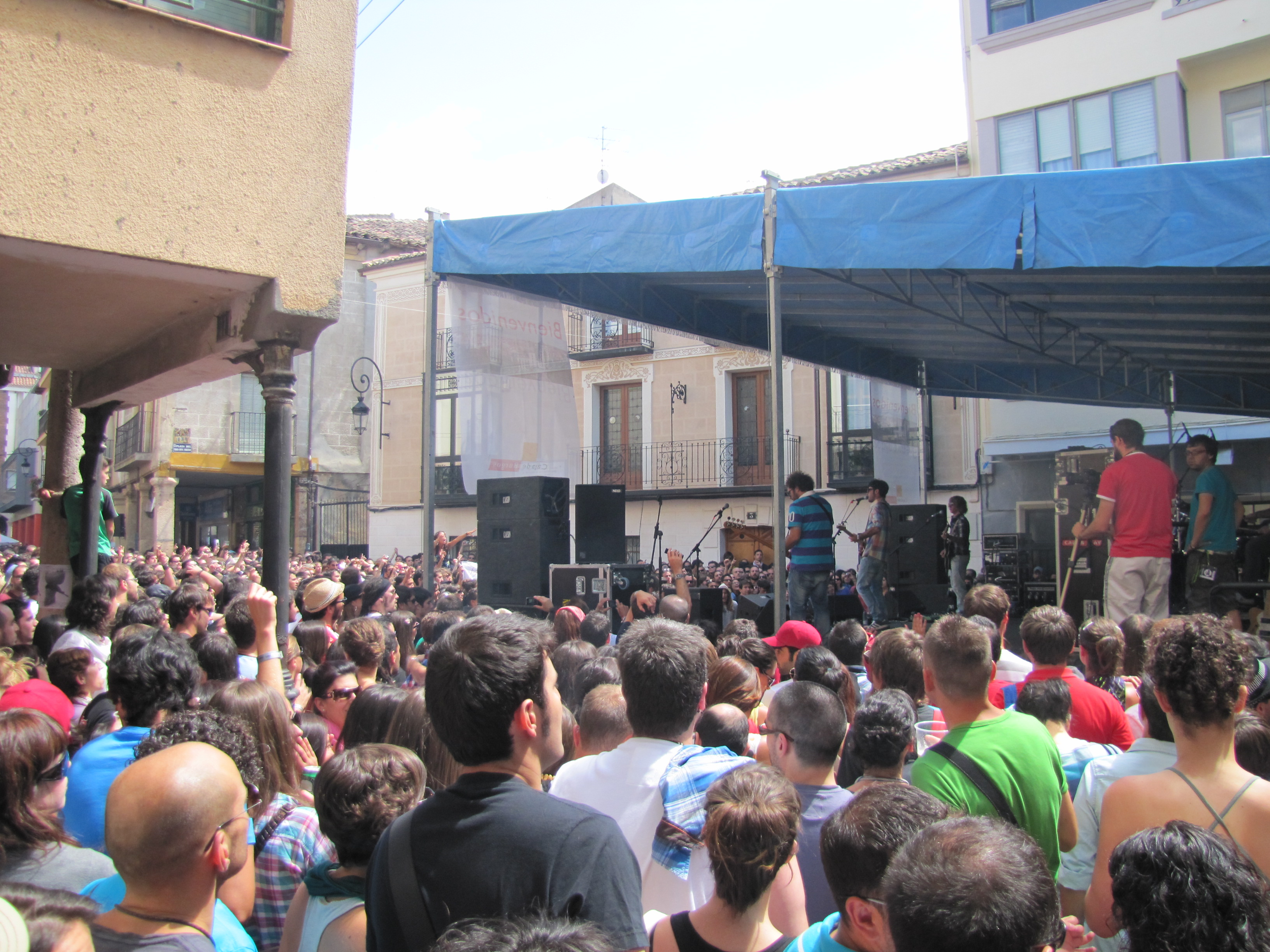
Supersubmarina during their performance in Sonorama 2011.

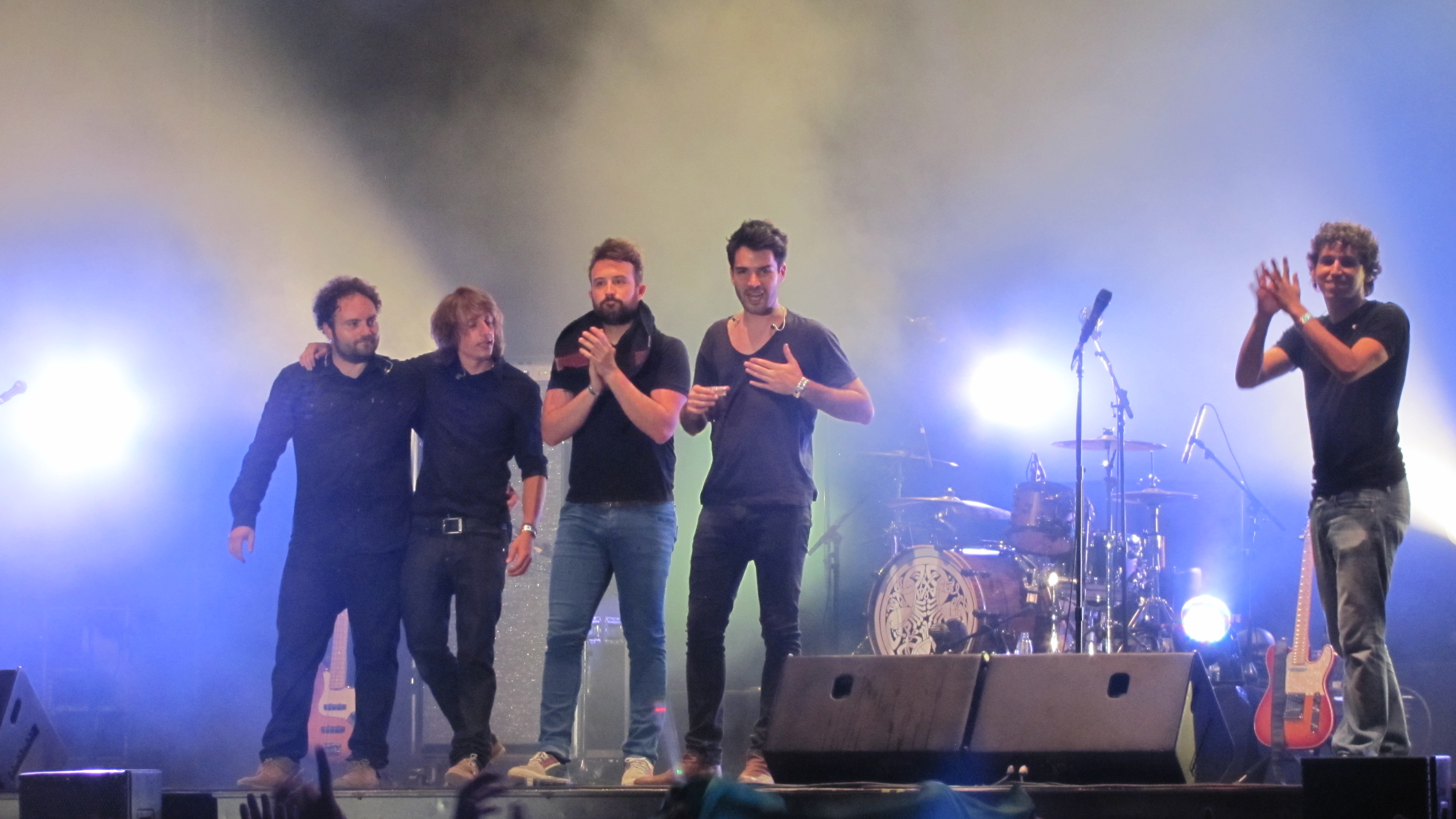
Supersubmarina during their performance in Sonorama 2013.

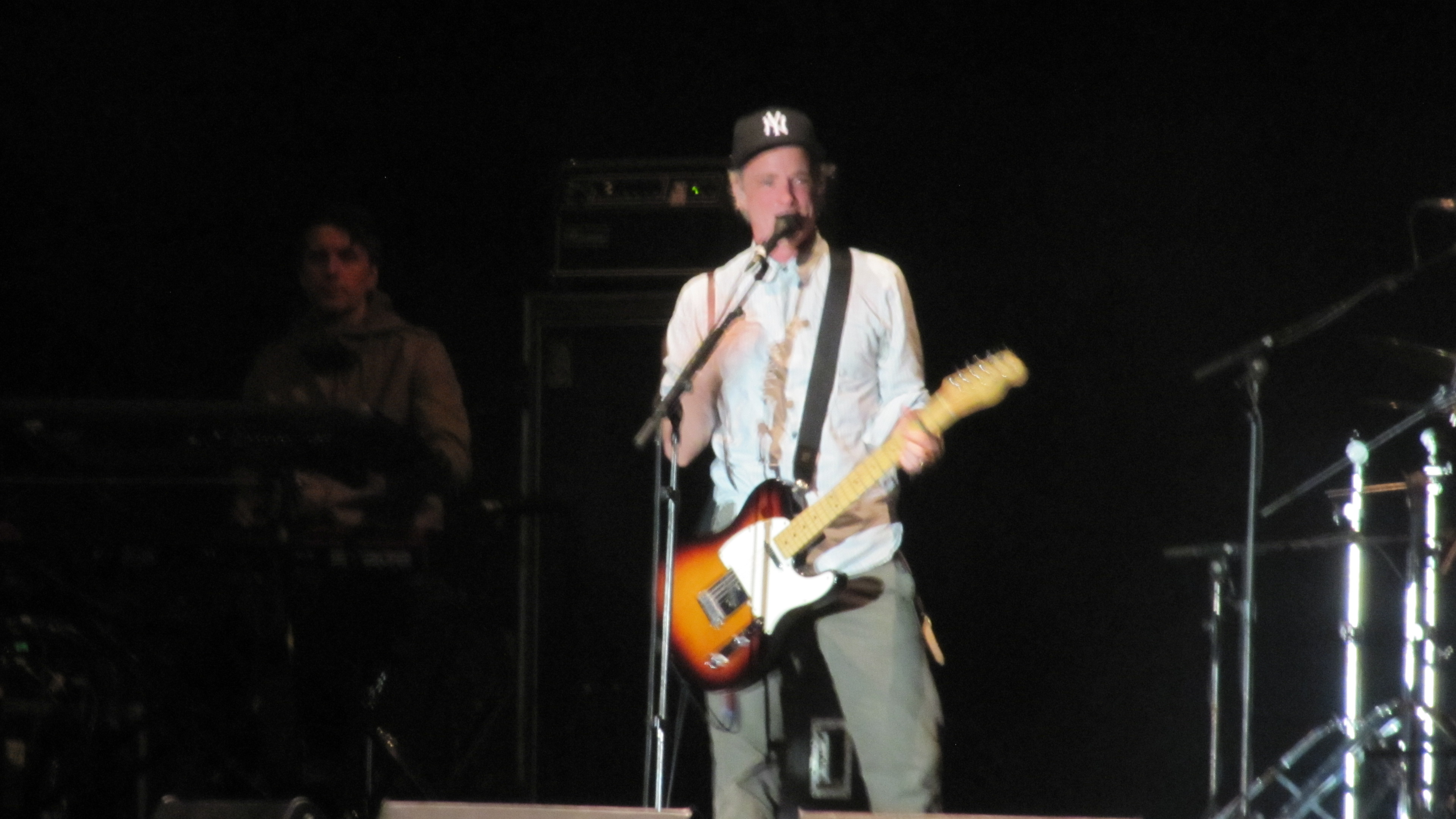
Travis performing at Sonorama 2011.

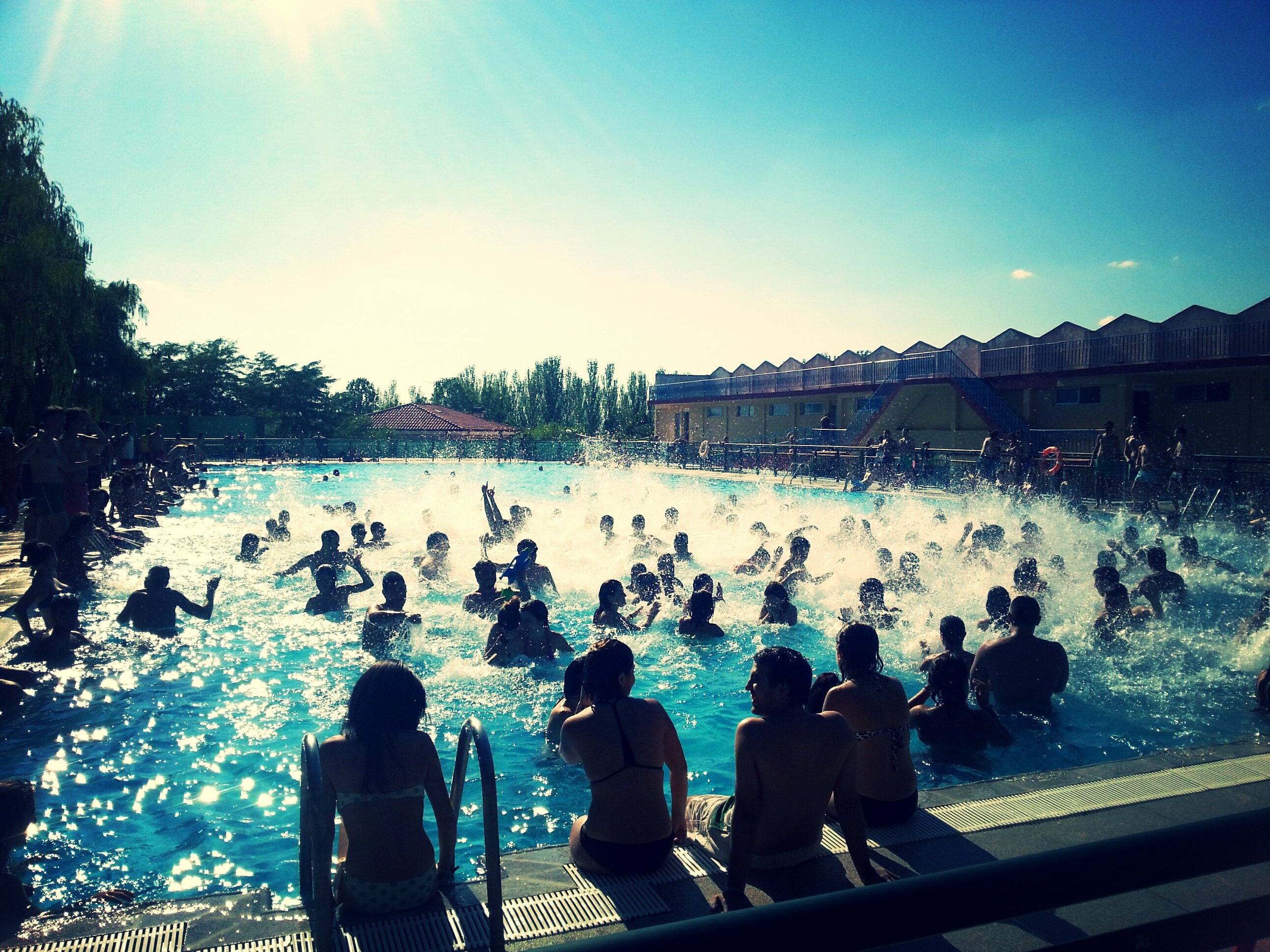
Pool party during Sonorama 2011.

Sonorama 2015, or Sonorama Ribera 2015, will be the 18th edition of the Sonorama Music Festival. It will take place in Aranda de Duero, Castile and León, (Spain) during mid August. It is organized by the non-profit cultural association "Art de Troya". The four-day music festival is expected to attract 40,000 spectators.

== International bands ==
- Anna Calvi (England)
- Calexico (United States)
- Clap Your Hands Say Yeah (United States)
- The Royal Concept (Sweden)
- Monarchy (England)
- 2ManyDJs (Belgium)

== Spanish bands Spain ==
- Vetusta Morla
- Supersubmarina
- Vive Morente (Estrella Morente + Soleá Morente + [[Los_Planetas_(band])#Los_Evangelistas|Los Evangelistas]]: Jota (Los Planetas) + Eric Jiménez + Florent Muñoz + Antonio Arias (Lagartija Nick))
- Arizona Baby
- Australian Blonde (only performance in festivals 2015)
- Carlos Jean
- Sidonie
- Xoél López
- Dorian
- Los Toreros Muertos
- Toundra
- Bigott
- Grupo de Expertos Solynieve
- Marlango
- Lichis
- Eme Dj
- Dinero
- Jero Romero
- Miguel Campello
- Joe Crepúsculo
- Sexy Zebras
- Fetén Fetén with Mastretta
- La Habitación Roja
- Acróbata
- Rufus T. Firefly
- La M.O.D.A.
- Ángel Stanich
- Aloha Carmouna
- Analogic
- Ángel Pop
- Ara Musa
- Bambinika
- Belize
- Bizgana
- Blusa
- Blutaski Dj
- Bye Bye Lullabye
- Canciller Polaco
- Casual Groupies
- Charanga Los Sobrinos de la Tía Damiana
- Chema Rey Dj
- Club del Río
- Con X de Banjo
- Corbat and Bola
- Correos
- Corrientes Circulares Dj Set
- The New Technocrats
- Digital XXI
- Dj Filo
- Dj La Fábrica de Colores
- Dj Ziry
- Don Gonzalo
- Durango 14
- El Cantaitor
- Eladio y los Seres Queridos
- Estereoclub Estereo
- Estrogenuinas
- Fast Forward
- Full
- Jacobo Serra
- Julian Maeso
- Kube (band)
- ...

== See also ==
- Sonorama
- Music of Spain

Preceded by Sonorama 2014	Festivals; Sonorama 2015	Succeeded by Sonorama 2016
