= Sonorama 2013 =

Spanish Music Festival

Coordinates: 41.6679°N 3.7004°W

Sonorama Ribera Festival
- Genre: Indie pop, indie rock, electronic music
- Dates: August 14–17
- Locations: Aranda de Duero, Castile and León, Spain
- Years active: 16 (since 1998)
- Website: www.sonorama-aranda.com

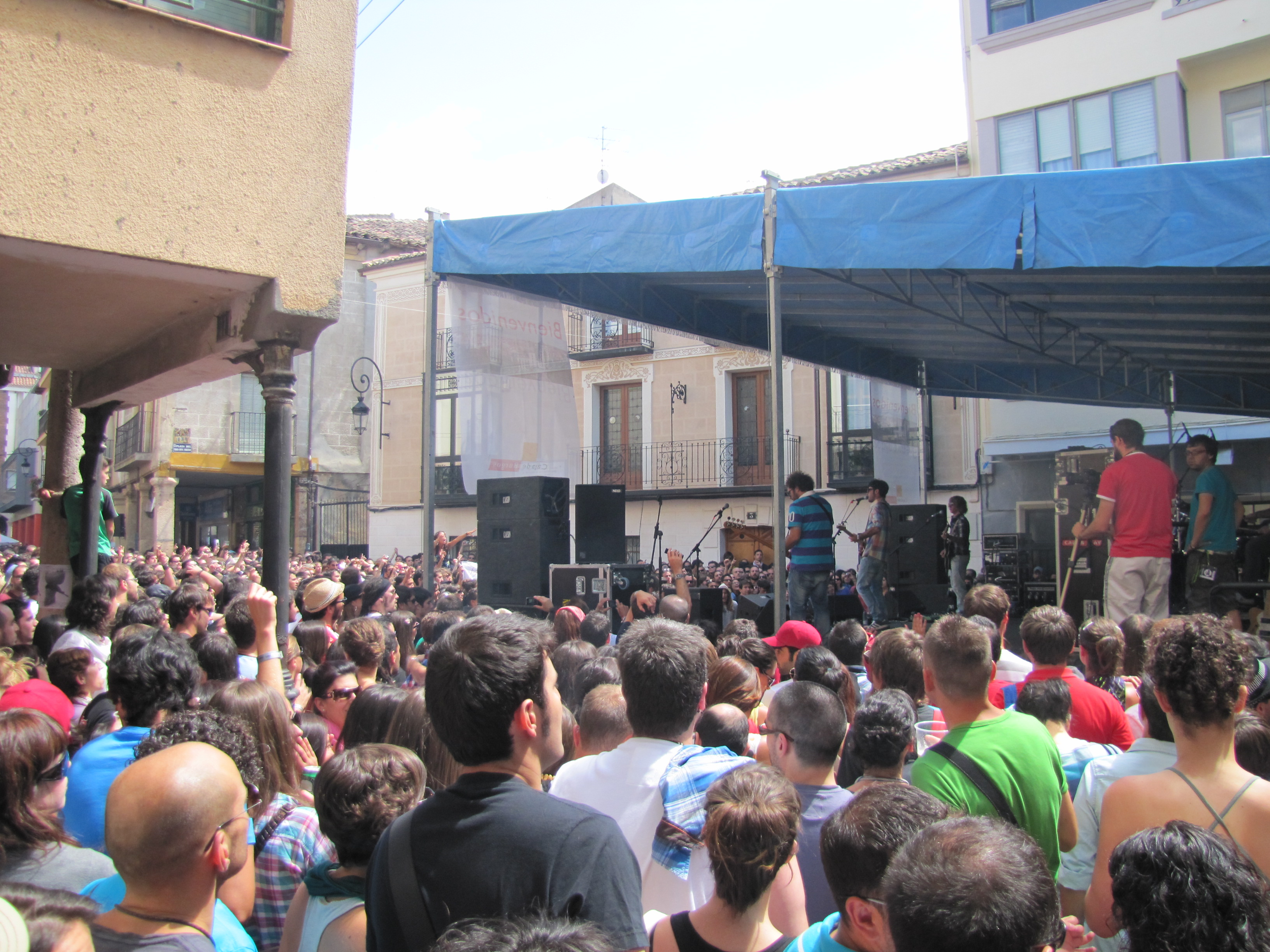
Supersubmarina in its performance in Sonorama 2011.

Sonorama 2013, or Sonorama Ribera 2013, was the 16th edition of the Sonorama Music Festival. It took place in Aranda de Duero in Castile and León (Spain) in mid-August. It was organized by the non-profit cultural association "Art de Troya". The four-day music festival had an expected participation of 40,000 spectators.

== International bands ==
- Travis (Scotland)
- Belle and Sebastian (Scotland)

== Spanish bands Spain ==
- Supersubmarina
- Lori Meyers
- Standstill presents Cenit
- Soleá Morente y los Evangelistas
- Loquillo y Amigos (30 Anniversary of El ritmo del Garaje)
- Jaime Urrutia
- Delafé y las flores azules
- Xoel López
- L.A.
- Luis Brea
- Mendetz
- Cyan
- Jero Romero (The Sunday Drivers)
- Stay
- Estereotypo
- Misscaffeina
- 84
- Alis
- Arsenal
- Astrobahn
- Autumn Comets
- Andrés Garrasparri
- Ángel Stanich
- Banda de Turistas
- Buffet Libre Dj's
- Cápsula
- Dehra Dun
- Drow
- DUNE
- Edredón
- Egon Soda
- El Capitán Elefante
- Eme dj
- Full
- Garamendi
- Havalina
- Igloo
- Indies Cabreados Dj´s
- Izal
- Jack Knife
- Jane Joyd
- Kill The Hipsters
- Klein
- Kuve
- La Doble Fila
- Las Despechadas Pinchadiscos
- Leon Benavente
- Llum
- Lorena Álvarez y su Banda Municipal
- Los Madison
- Los Marañones
- Los Nastys
- Los Tiki Phantoms
- Los Zigarros
- Man Pop & Güendi Dj
- Margot
- McEnroe
- Mine
- Mi pequeña radio
- Mucho
- Mummuc
- Musst H
- Pantones
- Para normales
- Pasajero
- Perro
- Pinky Dj (Radio3 Extra)
- Plank
- Pony Bravo
- Pumuky
- Raisa
- Santos
- Sethler
- Sexy Zebras
- Sharon Bates
- Sick Devils
- Sin Rumbo
- Superframe Dj's
- The Chinese Birdwatchers
- The Handicaps
- The Girondines
- The New Raemon & Maga
- The Panteras
- The Tea Servants
- Tokyo Sex Destruction
- Trajano!
- Tres notas project
- Triángulo de Amor Bizarro
- Tuya
- Última Experiencia
- We Are England
- Wiggum
- Wolrus

== See also ==
- Sonorama
- Music of Spain

Preceded by Sonorama 2012	Festivals; Sonorama 2013; 16	Succeeded by Sonorama 2014
