= Mondo Sonoro =

Spanish music magazine

- Categories: Music magazine
- Frequency: Monthly
- Circulation: 125.000
- Founder: Sergio Marqués; Jose Macarro
- Founded: 1994
- First issue: October 1994
- Country: Spain
- Based in: Barcelona
- Language: Spanish
- Website: mondosonoro.com

Mondo Sonoro, sometimes shortened to la Mondo, is a Spanish magazine established in 1994 which focuses on current alternative, popular and indie music, as well as national emerging bands. Co-founded by Sergio Marqués and Jose Macarro in Barcelona, Dani López joined them in 1995 and they are still in charge of the magazine. By 2019, Mondo Sonoro had a circulation of 125.000 monthly copies and over two million visits to its website every year.

Mondo Sonoro is distributed every month in clothes shops, discos, pubs and music venues for free, in eight regional divisions of Spain (Madrid, Catalonia-Balearic Islands, Valencian Community, Basque Country, Asturias-Cantabria, Galicia-Castile and León, Aragón, and Andalusia-Murcia-Extremadura), having a local edition for each area.

The magazine organises the yearly events Fiesta Demoscópica and Plaza Sonora, both serving as springboards for emerging bands.

== History ==
Mondo Sonoro was founded in 1994 by Sergio Marqués and Jose Macarro, two university students from Barcelona. The magazine evolved from their previous fanzine entitled BUM (Boletín Universitario Musical, translated as University's Music Bulletin). The magazine's first issue was published in October 1994, including reviews of shows by Red Hot Chili Peppers and Mano Negra. Using a rotary press, within the first year they distributed between 15.000 and 20.000 monthly copies of Mondo Sonoro in Barcelona, being the second independent magazine to reach that number after ABarna. The following year they were joined by commercial director Dani López. In 1996, the magazine expanded its coverage to Madrid and by 1998 it had seven regional editions across the country. In 1997, it was launched a website for the magazine and in March 2000 they began collaborating with Terra Networks. As of that year, Mondo Sonoro had around 30.000 and 40.000 monthly visits to its website.

Since 1999, Mondo Sonoro has organised the yearly Fiestas Demoscópicas free tour, where a group of emerging bands without any album are chosen to perform after they sent their demos to the magazine. In 2018, the magazine partnered with Matadero Madrid to launch Plaza Sonora, a 12-hour free show realised each year at the venue, and also including workshops, exhibitions and talks.

To mark the 20th anniversary of Mondo Sonoro in October 2014, the bands Sidonie, Love of Lesbian, Dorian and Standstill, all linked to the magazine from their beginnings, performed at Razzmatazz in Barcelona. Celebrating the magazine's 25th anniversary in 2019, there was a special show in Madrid in addition to the release of a compilation album featuring bands who appeared in the magazine during their formative years.

In April 2020, Mondo Sonoro published its first online issue due to the COVID-19 pandemic, and started a podcast series on this issue as well.
