= Izal (band) =

Former Spanish indie band

IZAL
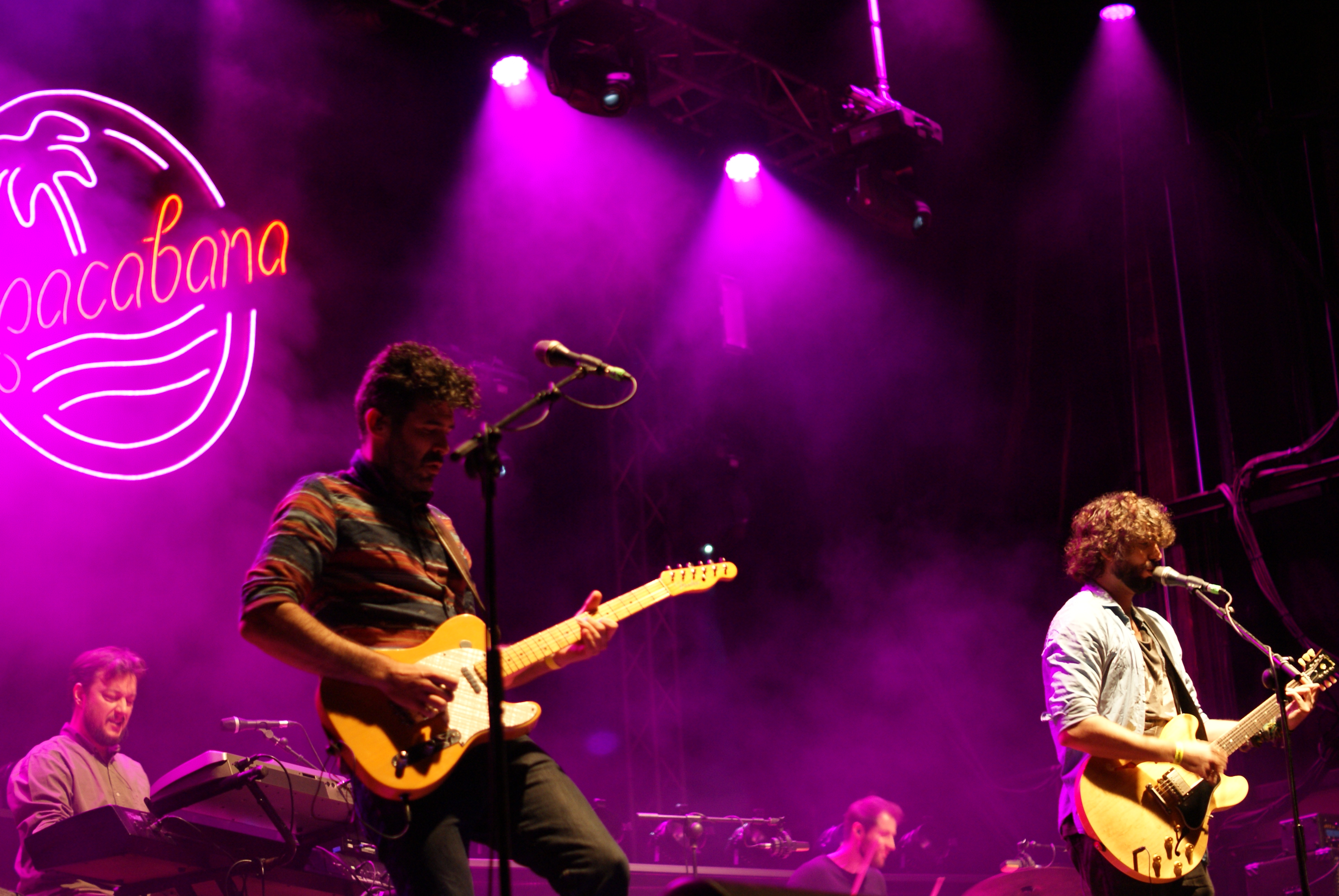
- Izal in concert 2016

Background information
- Origin: Madrid, Spain
- Genres: Indie pop, Indie rock
- Years active: 2010–2022
- Labels: Hook Ediciones Musicales, Altafonte
- Members: Mikel Izal; Alejandro Jordá; Emanuel Pérez; Alberto Pérez; Iván Mella
- Website: www.izalmusic.com

Izal, stylised as IZAL, was a Spanish indie band, formed in Madrid in 2010 by the lead singer Mikel Izal. The group disbanded in October 2022. The group released seven albums and two EPs during their existence, with a compilation album released in 2023. Their most successful album was Autoterapia (Self-therapy) which spent 134 weeks in the Spanish official album charts over four calendar years from 2018 to 2021, and earned their only album platinum disc.

The group members were Mikel Izal (composer, lead singer, guitarist), Alejandro Jordá (drums), Emanuel Pérez, also known as Gato (bass), Alberto Pérez (guitars), and Iván Mella (keyboards).

== History ==
=== Early years ===
Izal was formed in June 2010 in Madrid, though Mikel Izal and Emanuel Pérez had previously met up in September 2009 on a music project in Skopje, North Macedonia. The group took its name from the surname of the lead singer; this was at the behest of the other members of the band in order to head off Mikel Izal from deploying his own suggestions, such as El Último Hombre de Europa (The Last Man in Europe), (Note: Last Man in Europe was George Orwell's alternative title for his novel Nineteen Eighty-Four.) which were not so well received.

Izal's first concert was 26 November 2010 in Madrid, at Sala Taboo, now known as Club Malasaña. This gig saw the launch of Izal's first record release, an EP, Teletransporte (Teletransport). Much of 2011 was spent playing small venues and festivals in Madrid and elsewhere in Spain, as well as developing material for their first album. This was a self published and self distributed album Magia y Efectos Especiales (Magic and special effects) in March 2012. The initial print run sold out, and was re-released in February 2014, where it spent three weeks in the album charts.

In 2013 Izal released another album, Agujeros de Gusano, and this was distributed through mainstream channels. This entered the charts in October 2013 and reached 8th place in November, Izal's first commercial success. Their first recorded album, Magia y Efectos Especiales, followed in early 2014 and therefore is listed as their second album in terms of chart history.

=== Commercial success ===
Two years later came the third studio album, Copacabana, which entered the charts in September 2015 in number 2 position and was to spend 92 weeks there in total.

Between these record releases, Izal spent significant time on the road, doing gigs at increasingly larger venues, and being pitched higher up in the running order of festivals.. After Copacabana Izal developed a more themed approach to their own concerts, and were less reliant on supporting roles in festivals. They were also getting better radio airplay, video and music streaming exposure. Major retailers such as Fnac and El Corte Inglés were selling Izal's records, newspapers were interested in doing interviews with the group.

Izal's live performances were used to create the VIVO album in 2017, before Izal had their biggest commercial success with the album Autoterapia. With good publicity and radio coverage Autoterapia went to number 2 in the official charts March 2018. Izal appeared in a feature article in Esquire's Spanish edition.

Up until 2019 the band spent much of their time touring and participating in festivals inside Spain. There was a solo concert by Mikel Izal for the Sucre International Festival in Quito, Ecuador in June 2011. Their first concert as a band outside of Spain came in October 2014 when they performed at the Scala in London. This was followed in April 2015 when they played three concerts in Argentina. Emanuel Pérez is from Henderson, Argentina.. They returned to Argentina in February 2019, and at different times Izal toured the United States, Mexico, Colombia, the United Kingdom, Switzerland, Germany, France and Ireland, performing mainly in festivals. Their first gig in the United States was 2 July 2015 at the Instituto Cervantes in Chicago. They appeared at SXSW in Austin, Texas in March 2017..

In the early months of 2018 Izal become embroiled in a social media crisis. A number of women accused Mikel Izal of sexual harassment on X, then known as Twitter. Mikel Izal flatly denied any such harassment, and the allegations did not evolve further. The group and Mikel Izal found this the most traumatic stage of their career. When they released the album Hogar in 2021, it included a track called Meiuqèr — Requiem spelt backward — the lyrics of which addressed the pain they felt when the accusations were being circulated: "A whole year of doubt and silence, of hangover, whip, and salt. Of fighting, of risking my life, killing all truth with lies."

=== Launch of Autoterapia ===
The launch of the album Autoterapia at the end of 2018 prompted two sets of tours. The first tour round was also known as Autoterapia, and was launched with Izal's return to Argentina, at the Roxy, Buenos Aires, on 6 February 2019. The first performance in Spain was the Coliseum in A Coruña on 23 February. The Autoterapia tour made full use of projections as part of the performances. There were standalone events, including at the WiZink Center in Madrid, and an adapted version for use at festivals. The tour ended in October 2019, and had attracted 500,000 spectators.

In November 2019 Izal announced a second tour based on the Autoterapia album. The tour started in Granada for two nights starting 21 February 2020, then a further two nights in Barcelona, before going to Zaragoza for a single night on 9 March. The tour was scheduled with 12 performances in seven cities, and was due to end after two nights in Madrid on 19 April 2020. The tour was given the name of El Final del Viaje, the End of the Journey. On 13 March the Spanish government announced a state of alarm, restricting non-essential activities, as part of their response to the emerging Covid-19 pandemic. The tour was cut short after the Zaragoza show, with the remaining performances eventually cancelled. When restrictions were eased in the middle of 2021, Izal restarted the tour on 4 July 2021 in Valencia, with health restrictions in place, but this time dubbed El Pequeño Gran Final del Viaje (the Small Great End of the Journey), one of the many wordplays that came from Izal's 2015 song, Pequeña Gran Revolución (Small Great Revolution).

== End of Izal ==
In 2022, after two years with a limited roster of live performances, Izal launched a new set of tour dates, based around their last studio album Hogar. Hogar was different from their previous studio albums in that Izal engaged the services of the English producer Brett Shaw, who had previously worked with Florence and the Machine and Foals, as well as Spanish producer Sancho Gómez-Escolar. In February 2022 Izal announced that the last gig of that tour, on 29 October 2022 at WiZink Center in Madrid, would be the band's final concert. Due to the demand for tickets triggered by that announcement, Izal added an additional night at the same venue on 28 October. The band framed this as an "indefinite halt" (Note: The Spanish words used on their social media channels were: "el grupo parará de forma indefinida.") to their activities. The last song performed by Izal on both nights was La mujer de verde.

A year later Mikel Izal was interviewed as to the reasons behind the end of Izal. He said that it was his decision, prompted by his own artistic restlessness. He said the other members of the band were understanding of his motives.

== Singles ==
None of their singles were eligible for gold or platinum discs through the official Spanish singles chart, however their record distribution companies certified six songs in 2019 for platinum and gold discs as singles: Copacabana was certified as double platinum; Pequeña Gran Revolución, El Baile, Qué Bien and Pausa as platinum; and La Mujer de Verde as gold. At the time Qué Bien was their most popular Spotify track, with 22 million streams.

List of singles, with selected chart positions
Released	Single	Peak chart position	Weeks in chart
Released	Single	SPA	SPA
2015	Copacabana	72	3
2018	El Pozo (The well)	51	5
2018	Pausa (Pause)	46	4
2018	Autoterapia (Self-therapy)	97	1
2020	La Buena Sombra (The good shade)	97	1

== Albums ==
Izal released five studio albums, and two live performance albums. A further double album was released in 2023, after the band's dissolution, which was a compilation of singles, and some live versions in collaboration with other artists.

Izal's most successful album was Autoterapia, their fourth studio album, which went to number 2 in the album charts by sales in March 2018, and number 1 by streaming. One reviewer noted that Izal's sound was "becoming increasingly distinctive and identifiable."

All but one of their albums made appearances in the official Spanish charts. Izal's least successful chart album was the 2023 compilation Pequeños grandes éxitos, with a single week in the charts.

List of albums, with selected chart positions
Released	Album	Peak chart position	Weeks in chart	Certifications
Released	Album	SPA	SPA	Certifications
2012	Magia y Efectos Especiales (Magic and special effects)	33	3	
2014	Agujeros de Gusano (Worm holes)	8	42	
2014	Directo Sonorama 2014 (Festival live performance)			
2015	Copacabana	2	92	SPA: Gold
2017	VIVO (Copacabana live performance)	3	30	
2018	Autoterapia (Self-therapy)	2	134	SPA: Platinum
2021	Hogar (Home)	2	60	SPA: Gold
2023	Pequeños Grandes Éxitos (Small great hits) (compilation)	78	1	

== Extended play records ==
Izal's first record was an EP, Teletransporte, released in November 2010. Towards the end of the band's career Izal released their second and final EP, Micro abierto (Open mike) in March 2020. This second EP had collaborations with other artists.

== Musical style ==
Izal has been labelled as an indie group, and compared to another Spanish indie group, Love of Lesbian. Mikel Izal has stated that their musical genre is their own, and has suggested their style as pop arquitectónico (architectural pop). In later interviews Mikel Izal suggested that while the band was in the pop and rock category, their songs did have folk, psychedelic and flamenco influences. Miguel Ángel Bargueño, who wrote a biography of the band, said:

IZAL was categorized as indie, and they were: radically independent, since they never had a record label. Beyond that, one can find traces in their composition that have little to do with the "indie sound", if such a thing exists. Well into their career, Mikel's lyrics maintained a singer-songwriter feel. Alberto's guitar style is quite close to traditional rock, not to mention Iván's keyboards, often a legacy of progressive rock. Gato broke the languid bass lines of indie by introducing, if the song called for it, flourishes that could have been on a Red Hot Chili Peppers album. Those ingredients are not found in the music of other indie bands.
