= Anni B Sweet =

Spanish musical artist (born 1987)

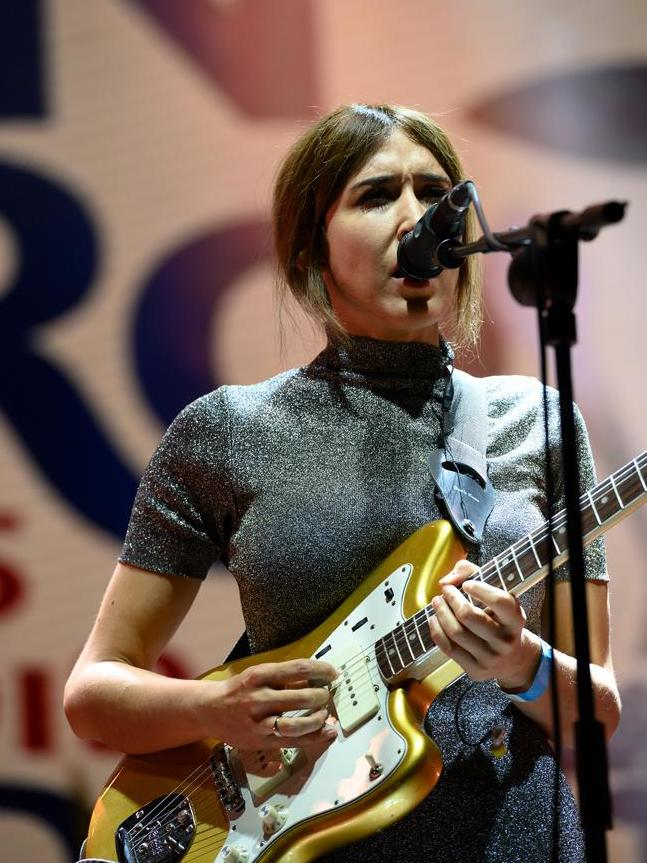
- 2019

Background information
- Born: Ana López Rodríguez; 1987 (age 38–39); Málaga, Spain
- Genre: Indie music
- Years active: 2007–present
- Website: Anni B Sweet

Anni B Sweet is the stage name of Ana Fabiola López Rodríguez (born 1987 in Málaga), a Spanish indie and folk singer-songwriter.

== Career ==
López has been composing songs since the age of seven and in her teenage years performed in a number of bands with her friends. In 2007, Anni started to perform as a solo artist and word of her spread among music fans through MySpace. In 2008, she was signed by Subterfuge Records, Spain's biggest independent label, with whom she released her debut album Start, Restart, Undo the following year. Anni was offered the chance to perform at the Festival Internacional de Benicàssim in 2009 before having released her album. This was followed up by a massive tour of Spain and several other countries. In October 2009 Anni's acoustic cover version of Take On Me, by A-Ha, was used on a television advert for a major fast food chain, and in 2019 it was used in Season One of the UK television show Brassic. She was also voted Artist Sensation of 2009 by El País online.

== Discography ==
=== Albums ===
- Start, Restart, Undo (2009)
- Oh, Monsters! (2012)
- Chasing Illusions (2015)
- Universo por Estrenar (2019)
- Alegria (2026)

=== Singles ===
- "Motorway"
- "La La La"
- "Take On Me"
- "At Home"
- "Getting Older"
- "Ridiculous Game 2060"
- "Locked In Verses"

== Awards and nominations ==
Award Ceremony	Year	Nominated work	Category	Result
Berlin Music Video Awards	2020	BUEN VIAJE	Best Song	Nominated
