= List of number-one albums of 2020 (Spain) =

Top 100 España is a record chart published weekly by PROMUSICAE (Productores de Música de España), a non-profit organization composed of Spanish and multinational record companies. This association tracks both physical sales (including CDs and vinyl) and digital (digital download and streaming) record consumption in Spain.

Since the chart dated July 2, 2020 (week 27), the sales list and the streaming list were merged into one chart.

== Albums ==
Week	Chart date	Album	Artist(s)	Ref
1	January 2	Tributo a Sabina: Ni tan Joven ni tan Viejo	Various Artists	
2	January 9	En tus planes	David Bisbal	
3	January 16	En tus planes	David Bisbal	
4	January 23	En tus planes	David Bisbal	
5	January 30	Origen	Fuel Fandango	
6	February 6	Un planeta llamado nosotros	Maldita Nerea	
7	February 13	En tus planes	David Bisbal	
8	February 20	Hecho en México	Alejandro Fernández	
9	February 27	Map of the Soul: 7	BTS	
10	March 5	Operación Triunfo 2020: Lo Mejor 1ª Parte	Various artists	
11	March 12	Bestieza	Los Enemigos	
12	March 19	EP2	Natalia Lacunza	
13	March 26	Impulso	Dvicio	
Chart suspended due to the COVID-19 pandemic				
27	July 2	Emmanuel	Anuel AA	
28	July 9	Acústico acústico acústico (En directo)	Manolo García	
29	July 16	Emmanuel	Anuel AA	
30	July 23	Emmanuel	Anuel AA	
31	July 30	Emmanuel	Anuel AA	
32	August 6	Emmanuel	Anuel AA	
33	August 13	Emmanuel	Anuel AA	
34	August 20	Emmanuel	Anuel AA	
35	August 27	Emmanuel	Anuel AA	
36	September 3	Libertad	Agoney	
37	September 10	Ruido de Fondo	Sidecars	
38	September 17	Enoc	Ozuna	
39	September 24	Un susurro en la tormenta	La Oreja de Van Gogh	
40	October 1	Enoc	Ozuna	
41	October 8	Enoc	Ozuna	
42	October 15	Con los pies en el suelo	Cepeda	
43	October 22	Lo que me dé la gana	Dani Martín	
44	October 29	Siete veces sí	Vanesa Martín	
45	November 5	El Árbol y el Bosque	Rozalén	
46	November 12	Aviónica	Antonio Orozco	
47	November 19	Power Up	AC/DC	
48	November 26	Madrid Nuclear (En Directo)	Leiva	
49	December 3	El Último Tour Del Mundo	Bad Bunny	
50	December 10	Aviónica	Antonio Orozco	
51	December 17	Vértigo	Pablo Alborán	
52	December 24	Vértigo	Pablo Alborán	
53	December 31	Vértigo	Pablo Alborán	

== Best selling albums in Spain in 2020 ==
Rank	Album	Artist(s)	Weeks charting	Release	Country	Ref(s)
1	YHLQMDLG	Bad Bunny	43	2020	Puerto Rico	
2	En Tus Planes	David Bisbal	52	2020	Spain	
3	Vértigo	Pablo Alborán	3	2020	Spain	
4	Emmanuel	Anuel AA	31	2020	Puerto Rico	
5	Colores	J Balvin	41	2020	Colombia	
6	Lo Que Me Dé La Gana	Dani Martín	11	2020	Spain	
7	La Cruz del Mapa	Manuel Carrasco	108	2018	Spain	
8	Prisma	Beret	62	2019	Spain	
9	Ni Tan Joven Ni Tan Viejo	Various artists	48	2019	Various	
10	Fine Line	Harry Styles	55	2019	England	
11	Aviónica	Antonio Orozco	9	2020	Spain	
12	El Danzar de las Mariposas	El Barrio	61	2019	Spain	
13	Letter To You	Bruce Springsteen	10	2020	United States	
14	Las Que No Iban a Salir	Bad Bunny	34	2020	Puerto Rico	
15	Siete Veces Sí	Vanesa Martin	10	2020	Spain	
16	Spoiler	Aitana	82	2019	Spain	
17	Future Nostalgia	Dua Lipa	40	2020	England	
18	Enoc	Ozuna	17	2020	Puerto Rico	
19	Power Up	AC/DC	7	2020	Australia	
20	11 Razones	Aitana	3	2020	Spain	
21	#ElDisco	Alejandro Sanz	88	2019	Spain	
22	6.0	Raphael	5	2020	Spain	
23	Nuclear	Leiva	93	2019	Spain	
24	Easy Money Baby	Myke Towers	39	2020	Puerto Rico	
25	El Árbol y el Bosque	Rozalén	9	2020	Spain	
26	When We All Fall Asleep, Where Do We Go?	Billie Eilish	92	2019	United States	
27	Mirándote a los Ojos	José Luís Perales	42	2020	Spain	
28	El Último Tour del Mundo	Bad Bunny	5	2020	Puerto Rico	
29	El Mal Querer	Rosalía	113	2018	Spain	
30	Acústico, Acústico, Acústico (en Directo)	Manolo García	25	2020	Spain	
31	Bailando en la Batalla	Nil Moliner	45	2020	Spain	
32	Chromatica	Lady Gaga	32	2020	United States	
33	Map of the Soul: 7	BTS	41	2020	South Korea	
34	Por Primera Vez	Camilo	37	2020	Colombia	
35	Unikornio - Once Millones de Versos Después de Ti	Pablo López	2	2020	Spain	
36	x100pre	Bad Bunny	39	2018	Puerto Rico	
37	Sabina 70	Joaquín Sabina	56	2019	Spain	
38	10-20-40	Melendi	53	2019	Spain	
39	Fuego	Estopa	55	2019	Spain	
40	Posible	Bunbury	16	2020	Spain	
41	Balas Perdidas	Morat	111	2018	Colombia	
42	Tragas o Escupes	Jarabe de Palo	32	2020	Spain	
43	Afrodisíaco	Rauw Alejandro	7	2020	Puerto Rico	
44	Todas Las Mujeres Que Habitan en Mi	Vanesa Martín	108	2018	Spain	
45	Lo Mejor - Parte 1	Operación Triunfo 2020	21	2020	Spain	
46	Papi Juancho	Maluma	19	2020	Colombia	
47	1 Of 1	Sech	28	2020	Panama	
48	Con Los Pies En El Suelo	Cepeda	12	2020	Spain	
49	Un Susurro a la Tormenta	La Oreja de Van Gogh	15	2020	Spain	
50	Madrid Nuclear (en Directo)	Leiva	6	2020	Spain	
