= Exsonvaldes =

French alternative rock/indie rock band

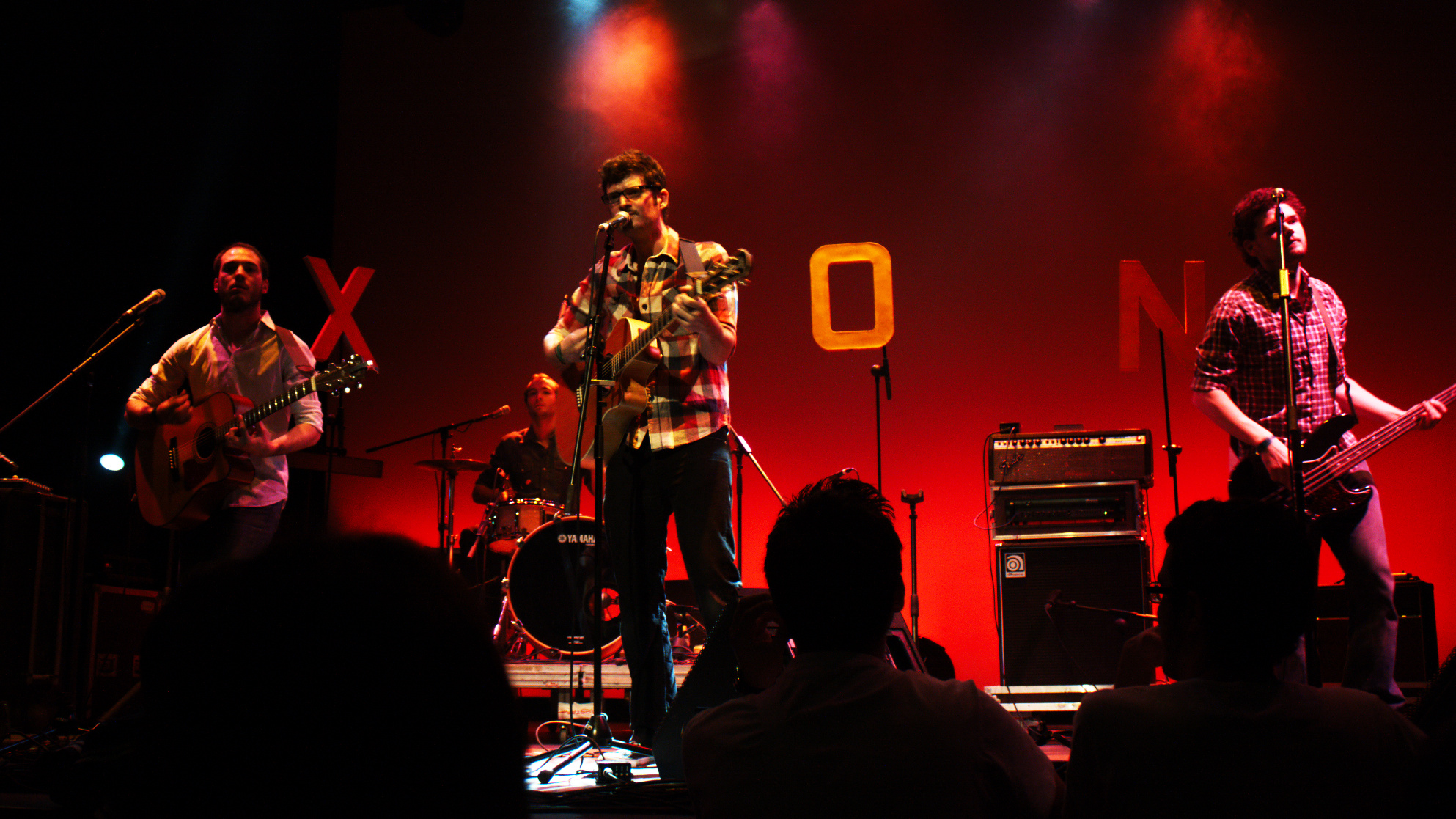
- Exsonvaldes in Seville in 2010.

Background information
- Origin: Paris, France
- Genres: Alternative rock, indie rock, indie pop
- Years active: 2001–present
- Labels: Interference, Le Periscope, Green UFOs
- Members: Simon Beaudoux; Antoine Bernard; Martin Chourrout
- Website: www.exsonvaldes.net

Exsonvaldes is an alternative rock/indie rock band from Paris, France, consisting of Simon Beaudoux, Antoine Bernard, Martin Chourrout and Cyrille Nobilet.

== History ==
The four founding members (Simon, Antoine, Guillaume and Martin) met at the university in Paris. The name of the band, inspired by the infamous Exxon Valdez disaster, was chosen only for its sound, and modified to be unique.

The band's first album, Time we spent together was released in May 2004. The band then toured extensively in France and Europe, notably with Girls in Hawaii.

The band's second album, Near the Edge of Something Beautiful, produced by Alex Firla (known for his work on Phoenix's first album United), was released in March 2009. While touring for this album in France, Spain and Germany, the band experimented with House shows, and eventually performed more than 50 shows in living-rooms across Europe. The band released the acoustic album There's no place like homes in January 2010 (including covers of Take on me and As tears go by) as testimony of this experiment.

In 2012, Guillaume Gratel left the band and was replaced by Cyrille Nobilet.

In March 2013, Exsonvaldes released its third album, Lights, to great reviews. Again produced by Alex Firla, the album features songs sung in French (for the first time in the band's history), especially the single L'aérotrain. The video for this song, direct by Naël Marandin, features previously unreleased archive footage of the French Aérotrain. The video for the first single, Days, shot in sequence using only Apple devices, received praise from Jonathan Ive himself.

The band's fourth album, Aranda, was released on March 3, 2016. Produced by Alex Firla, it has been partly recorded in Spain (where the band has received both public and critical acclaim), in the city of Aranda De Duero. It includes two songs with the Spanish singer Helena Miquel, from the bandFacto Delafé y las Flores Azules.

In 2017, the band announced they were taking an indefinite hiatus. In 2018, Simon Beaudoux and Martin Chourrout launched a new project, Ravages.

== Members ==
Current members

- Simon Beaudoux - Vocals, guitars
- Antoine Bernard - Guitars, keyboards, backing-vocals
- Martin Chourrout - Drums

Live members

- Quentin Rochas - Bass
- Noé Russeil - Bass

Past members

- Guillaume Gratel - Bass
- Cyrille Nobilet - Bass
- Jérôme Arrighi - Bass

== Discography ==
=== Albums ===
Title	Date	Label
Time We Spent Together	2004	Noise Digger
Near The Edge of Something Beautiful	2009	Volvox Music, Green UFOs, Cargo Records, Flake Records
There's No Place Like Homes	2010	Volvox Music, Green UFOs
Lights	2013	Interference, Le Periscope, Green UFOs
Aranda	2016	Finalistes
Maps	2023	Finalistes
