= Loquillo (singer) =

Spanish rock singer (born 1960)

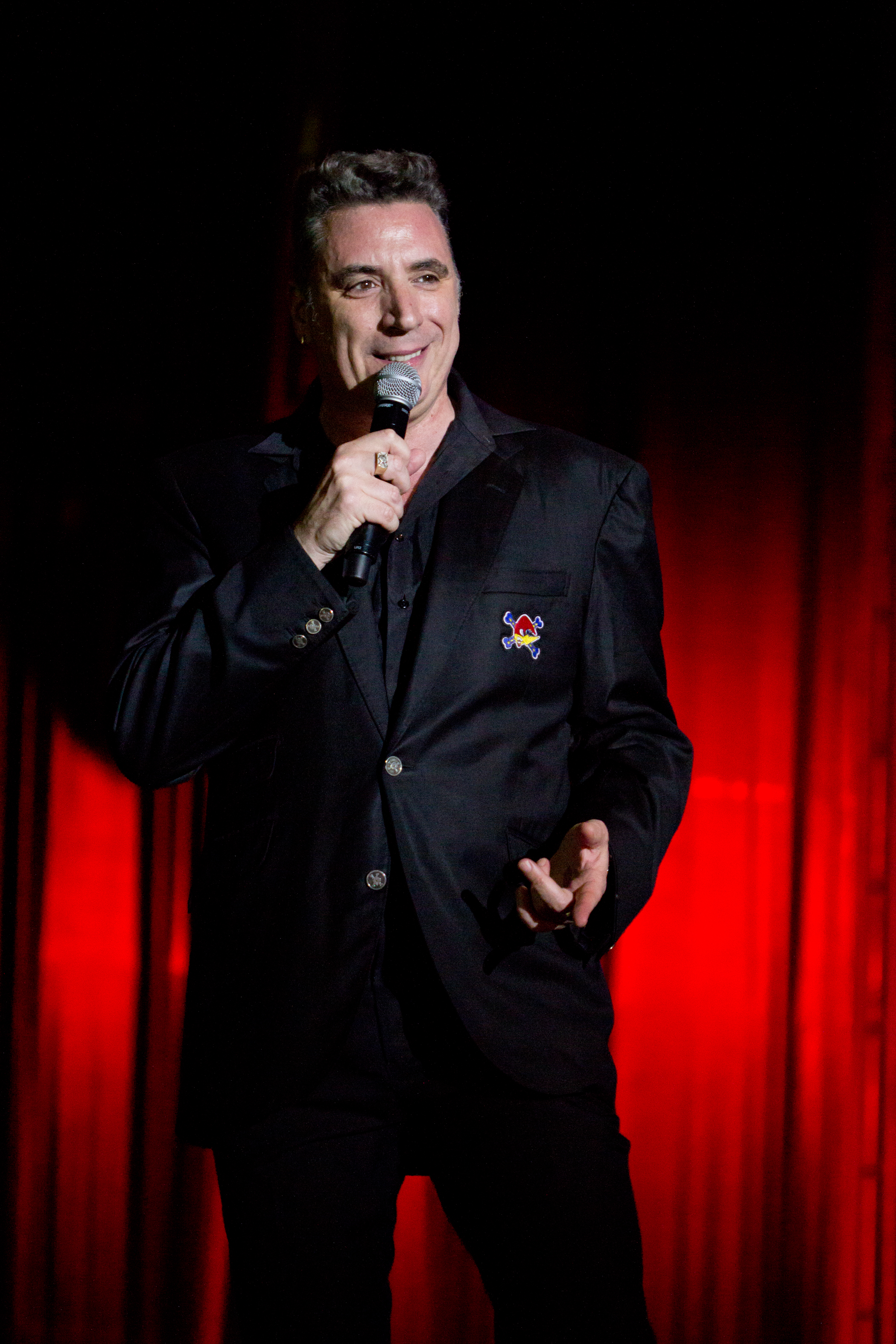
Loquillo during a concert in Músicos en la naturaleza in Hoyos del Espino (2013)

José María Sanz Beltrán, Loquillo or Loco (born 21 December 1960) is a Spanish rock singer. He was born in Barcelona. Beginning in the 1980s, he performed as Teddy Loquillo, and then with the groups Loquillo y los Intocables, and later Loquillo y Los Trogloditas. He started out as a rockabilly artist, and then became more famous mixing pop, punk and rock. He played as a solo act as well as performing with the Trogloditas, but they broke up in 2008. Nowadays, he's a widely recognised solo artist in Spain. He also writes blogs on elmundo.es.

== Discography Loquillo y los Intocables ==
- 1980- Los tiempos están cambiando, Cúspide
- 1981- Rock and Roll Star (single), Cúspide
- 1981- Esto no es Hawaii (single), Cúspide
- 1982- Autopista (single)

== Discography Loquillo y Los Trogloditas ==
Studio and Live Albums:

- 1983- El ritmo del garaje, Tres Cipreses
- 1984- ¿Dónde estabas tú en el 77?, DRO/Tres Cipreses
- 1985- La Mafia del Baile, Hispavox
- 1987- Mis problemas con las mujeres, Hispavox
- 1988- Morir en Primavera, Hispavox
- 1989- ¡A por ellos...! que son pocos y cobardes (doble directo), Hispavox
- 1991- Hombres, Hispavox
- 1993- Mientras respiremos, Hispavox
- 1996- Tiempos asesinos, Hispavox
- 1997- Compañeros de viaje (doble directo), EMI-Hispavox
- 2000- Cuero Español, EMI music Spain-Odeón
- 2001- Feo, fuerte y formal, Konga Music/Blanco y Negro
- 2004- Arte y ensayo, DRO East West
- 2006- Hermanos de Sangre (doble directo + DVD), DRO Atlantic

== Reeditions ==
- 2001- El ritmo del garage (remastered, sold as a disc/book), DRO East West/3 Cipreses
- 2005- ¡A por ellos...! que son pocos y cobardes (remastered with a DVD), EMI-Hispavox
- 2007- Compañeros de viaje (remastered with a DVD), EMI-Hispavox

== Compilations ==
- 1987- Loquillo & Sabino 1981-1984, DRO/Tres Cipreses
- 1993- Héroes de los 80, DRO
- 1997- Simplemente lo mejor, Hispavox
- 1998- 1978-1998, Hispavox
- 2002- Historia de una actitud * 25 años de Rock & Roll* (+ DVD), EMI-Hispavox
- 2007- The Platinum Collection, EMI-ODEON

== Discography Loquillo ==
With Gabriel Sopeña:

- 1994- La vida por delante, EMI-Hispavox
- 1998- Con elegancia, PICAP
- 2005- Mujeres en pie de guerra (banda sonora original del documental homónimo), DRO Atlantic

== Solo ==
- 1999: Nueve tragos, Zanfonia
- 2008: Balmoral
- 2016: Viento del este
- 2016: Salud y Rock and Roll
- 2019: El último clásico
- 2022: Diario de Una Tregua

== Others ==
- 1981- Loquillo y sus amigos (Los tiempos están cambiando), Cuspide - Reedita Hispavox
- 2000- Loquras (rarities), EMI-Hispavox
- 2007- Nueve tragos (remastered reedition), DRO Atlantic
