= Dorian (Spanish band) =

Spanish pop-rock band

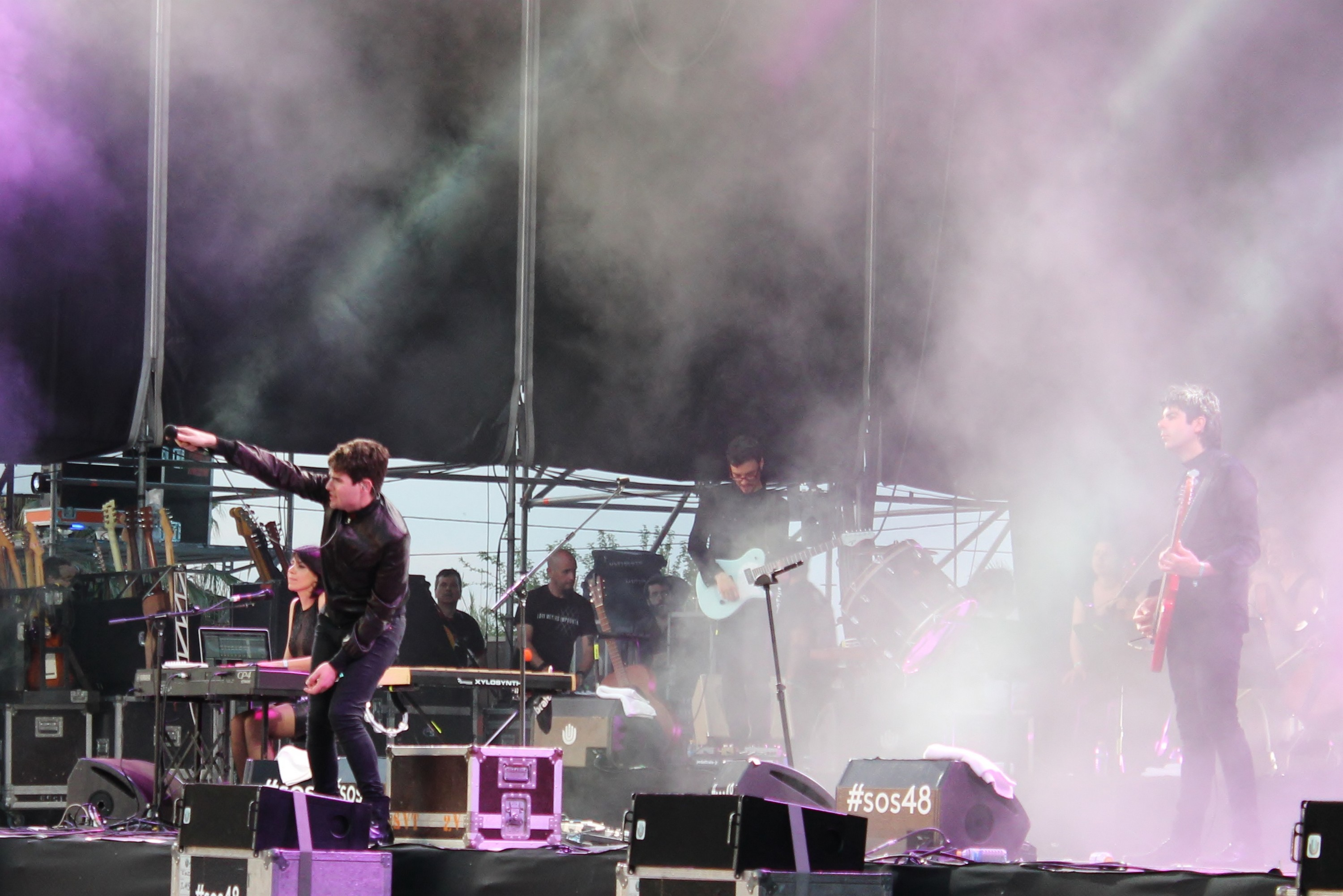
- Dorian performing at SOS 4,8 Festival in Murcia, Spain

Background information
- Origin: Barcelona, Spain
- Genres: Indie Pop, Indietronic, Electropop, Dance-Punk, Electronic Rock
- Years active: 2002 - present
- Label: Bip bip PIAS
- Members: Marc Gili (vocals, guitar, arrangements) Belly Hernández (piano, synthesizers, arrangements) Bart Sanz (bass) Victor López (drums) Lisandro Montes (guitar, synthesizers, arrangements)
- Website: http://www.webdorian.com

Dorian is a Spanish band from Barcelona which was formed in 2004. Its sound is a mixture of styles such as new wave, electronic music and indie rock. Dorian is considered one of the most nationally renowned artists in the Spanish music scene. They regularly go on tour in Latin America and European countries like France and Portugal. As of now they have recorded 6 albums: 4 studio albums with original songs, an unplugged album named ‘’Diez años y un día’’ (featuring acoustic versions of their most successful songs) and a CD which was recorded during their concert at Arenal Sound Festival, in 2015.

The band was formed by Marc Gili (main composer and lyricist), Belly Hernández (piano, synthesizers, arrangements and vocals) and Bart Sanz (bass). The other two main members are Lisandro Montes (synthesizers, guitar, arrangements and vocals) and Víctor López (drums).

In recent years, some of their songs like Cualquier otra parte, Paraísos artificiales and La tormenta de arena have become hits and have received millions of views in YouTube.

== History ==
=== Early years ===
At the beginning of the 2000s, Barcelona had a lively music scene, in both the rock & pop and electronic genres. Marc Dorian, Belly Hernández and Bart Sanz (three musicians linked to the independent scene) decided to start a project the sound of which was a combination of new wave elements from the 80s and electronic sounds from the 90s and 2000s. That is why some of the earliest influences of the band were groups like Radio Futura, Nacha Pop, Aviador Dro, New Order, The Cure, The Chameleons, Dntel and The Postal Service.

It was not easy for Dorian at the beginning. They went for a sound based on the mixture of synthesizers and guitars and lyrics in Spanish, but the underground musical scene was mostly dominated by rock in English. Nevertheless, the band made their way step by step winning demo competitions, like the one organized by the Zorrock Festival in which the band won against 1500 contestants.

The band's first forays abroad were at festivals like the MIFOC (Balkans) and the Maus Hábitos (Portugal). Between 2003 and 2004 Dorian performed in many Spanish cities. This tour helped the band to be recognized just before they released their first album.

=== 2004: 10.000 metrópolis ===
10.000 metrópolis is the title of their debut album. Critics praised their work and the band had its own place in the musical scene. Songs like Solar or Te echamos de menos (which is about the death of a young person) became underground hits which are still being played in indie clubs. Between 2005 and 2009, Te echamos de menos was included on 12 compilation albums.

In 2005 this debut album was reissued named 10,000 metropolis Vs. 10,000 metropolis remixes, including a second album of remixes of the songs performed by some of the best DJs in the music scene at the time, among which were DJ Undo (Razzmatazz / The Loft), Ferenc (Nitsa - Apolo) and Dj Coco (Nitsa - Apolo).

In 2006 Dorian toured the best clubs and festivals in Spain. Internationally recognized events, such as Benicassim (at which they are regulars), BAM and Primavera Sound, in addition to other events such as Expresa Pamplona, Festival Do Norte, Festival Tendencias, Indirama, Low Cost, Razzmatazz, Apolo, Stereo, and El Cau, allowed the band to perform on big stages and share bills with artists such as Suede, Placebo, Frank Black and Underworld. At the same time, the band began to focus on recording a second album that would unexpectedly end up driving the band's career.

=== 2007: El futuro no es de nadie ===
In 2007, Dorian released El futuro no es de nadie, reinforcing its indie musical style composed of electronic melodies, and poetic and politically motivated lyrics, the anthem of which is the successful single "Cualquier otra parte", turned into a generational hymn in Spain the importance of which has now reached countries like Mexico, Chile, Colombia, Peru and Argentina. This second album resulted in an extensive two-year tour and more than 150 performances, which allowed them to perform at renowned clubs and festivals in Spain, Portugal and the United States.

At the moment "Cualquier otra parte" is considered one of the first songs that obtained massive support thanks to social networks in Spain, without relying on the support of promotional or marketing campaigns.

Some lyrics from El futuro no es de nadie, like "La playa bajo el asfalto", "Cualquier otra parte" or the title track, were used as slogans by some protesters during the campout of the movement 15-M in Madrid, when the economic crisis that struck the United States and Europe broke out in 2008.

=== 2009: La ciudad subterránea ===
The band's third album, titled La ciudad subterránea, was released in 2009 after a tough recording process that lasted 8 months. This album reached the top 30 on the AFYVE sales list and it was rated as the best album of 2009 and the 32nd of the decade in the independent magazine Mondosonoro.

With this work, Dorian conquered the dance floors and they managed to consolidate as one of the leading bands in the new independent music scene, formed by groups that have managed to get ahead without submitting to the mercantilist interests of the music industry. La ciudad subterránea took the band to Canada, Argentina, Chile and Mexico, a country where they played in front of thousands of spectators at several festivals and venues, among them the prestigious festival Vive Latino.

For the singles from La ciudad subterránea, the band filmed an original trilogy of video clips, with the video producer Crampton, in which the same story of love between young people is narrated as beginning, middle and end. The songs selected for this trilogy of video clips were in this order: La tormenta de arena, Paraísos artificiales and La mañana herida, that nowadays are essential songs at any of the band's concerts. This trilogy of video clips has received millions of views on Internet channels like YouTube and Vimeo.

After an extensive tour that brought them for the first time to Canada, Argentina and Chile, Dorian ended 2009 with fourteen consecutive hits in Spain and three well-attended concerts in Mexico, in which they accompanied Zoé and Café Tacvba, two of the most important bands of the Aztec scene.

In 2010 Dorian did a joint tour of Spain with Love of Lesbian and continued to visit Mexico, a country in which the band is widely valued and ended up spending much of 2012.

The Mexican edition of La ciudad subterránea is edited by Terrícolas Imbéciles and collaborates with Denise Gutiérrez (lo blondo) from the band Hello Seahorse! In the song Verte amanecer and by Leon Larregui, the singer of Zoé, in the song Simulacro of emergencia.

=== 2013: La velocidad del vacío ===
La velocidad del vacío, the Barcelona band's fourth album, was produced by Phil Vinall, known for his work with bands such as Placebo, Pulp, the Auteurs, Radiohead and Zoé. The album reached the top 11 in the Spanish sales charts (AFYVE), remaining near the top of the chart for several weeks, and number 3 on ITunes.

It was released in countries such as Colombia, Mexico, Argentina and Chile. La velocidad del vacío was recorded and produced in Fatman Studios in Mexico City. This work is distinguished from the rest of the band's productions by its sound, more analogue and direct, in which electronics does not play such a predominant role.

In La velocidad del vacío the band also introduced some sounds typical of the United States-Mexico border area, especially in songs like the hit song "El tremblor" and "El sueño eterno", considered unanimously by public and critics as two of the best compositions of the band.

"Los amigos que perdí", the first single from La velocidad del vacío, was voted by the musical press of Spain, Mexico and Colombia as one of the best songs of 2013.

=== 2015: Diez años y un día ===
In 2015 Dorian celebrated their first ten years as a band with a special album: Diez años y un día.

It is an unplugged album in which the band reinvented in an acoustic key some of their most iconic themes, such as "Cualquier otra parte", "Verte amanecer", "El temblor", "Los amigos que perdí" and "La tormenta de arena". They round off the album with two unreleased tracks: "Arrecife" (which opens the album) and "Ara", a song sung in Catalan, in which the band tackles the profound disconnection that is being experienced in Europe and Spain between the political class and the citizens. Diez años y un día shows a rare instrumental display in contemporary music that includes pianos, cello, violins, wind instruments, theremin, harpsichords, acoustic and electric guitars, mandolins, percussion and even the harmonious timbre of the ronroco, an instrument made of rope originating in the Southern Cone of America that belongs to the charangos family.

The album includes a version of "Los amigos que perdí" sung as a duet with Santi Balmes, lead singer of Love of Lesbian, and "El temblor", which features the collaboration of Mexican singer Marion Sosa, member of the Mexican duet Love la femme. Diez años y un día was top 9 in Spain and has been released in numerous countries. The band is currently immersed in an intense tour of Spain and much of Latin America.

They recently released the video of the other version included in Diez años y un día, starring the prestigious actors Daniel Brühl (Inglorious Bastards, Good Bye, Lenin!, Rush, Captain America: Civil War) and María Valverde (Three Meters above the sky, Exodus, now or never). Directed in quality film by Alexandre Tregón, the video shows the origin of an infectious love between both protagonists, who are found again through the music of Dorian after a separation.

== Discography ==
- 2004: 10.000 metrópolis (LP).
- 2005: 10.000 metrópolis vs. 10.000 metrópolis remixes (doble CD).
- 2006: El futuro no es de nadie (LP).
- 2009: La ciudad subterránea (LP).
- 2013: La velocidad del vacío (LP).
- 2015: Diez años y un día
- 2016: Arenal Sound live performance: Diez años y un día
- 2018: Justicia Universal
- 2022: Ritual
- 2024: Futuros Imposibles

=== Singles ===
- Solar.
- 2006: Te echamos de menos.
- 2007: Cualquier otra parte.
- 2007: Tan lejos de ti.
- 2008: Más problemas.
- 2009: La tormenta de arena.
- 2010: Paraísos artificiales.

=== Music videos ===
- 2007: Cualquier otra parte.
- 2007: Tan lejos de ti.
- 2008: Más problemas.
- Trilogy La ciudad subterránea: the story is narrated in three parts in short clip format, it was filmed by the producer Crampton.
- 2009: La tormenta de arena.
- 2010: Paraísos artificiales.
- 2010: La mañana herida.
- 2013: El temblor.
- 2013: El sueño eterno.
- 2013: Soda Stereo.
- 2015: Arrecife.
- 2015: Los amigos que perdí feat. Santi Balmes from Love of Lesbian
- 2015: Cualquier otra parte feat. Daniel Brühl and María Valverde.

== Nominations ==
The band has been nominated for the IMAS (Mexican independent music awards) for Best Spanish Artist. They have also been nominated for the MIN awards (independent music awards in Spain) and for the MTV EMAs (Europe Music Awards) in 2010.
