= The Sunday Drivers =

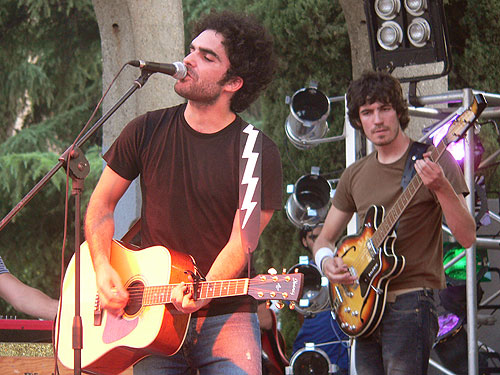
- Sunday Drivers performing in a park in Berlin, Germany, 2005

Background information
- Origin: Toledo, Spain
- Genres: Indie pop
- Years active: 1999-2010

The Sunday Drivers was a Spanish indie-pop group that was formed in Toledo, Spain in 1999. They retired after playing for the last time on July 17, 2010, at the Festival Internacional de Benicàssim (FIB).

They were winners of several contests of new bands, including the "Young Artists Competition of Castilla La Mancha." They provided songs for TV commercials such as the promotional advertising campaign for Castilla La Mancha. They recorded in "The Concert Radio3" at least three times. They launched their first album, Rock Indiana, at a party in the venue Moby Dick in Madrid in 2002.1 With them The Sunday Drivers released their first self-titled album in 2003. They cite their influences as The Raconteurs and The Black Keys.

Later, after his first job, they start working with management December Producciones and his hand ficharían in 2004 by Mushroom Pillow, who released their second album, Little Heart Attacks, distributed internationally by the French independent label launched in 2007 Naïve.1 their third album, Tiny Telephone.

They reaped some success in countries such as France (where they toured, playing with artists such as Beastie Boys), Holland (where they played at the Festival "Eurosonic"), or Greece. In Spain they opened for artists such as Wilco and Coldplay, playing festivals like FIB, and received good reviews. They, along with their tours of Spain, a tour of several European concert accompanied by a symphony orchestra.

Their last album, The End of Maiden Trip, was released in 2009.

The May 12, 2010, after months of rumours, Jero Romero, the singer and guitarist of the group, confirmed that the group had split up, eleven years after its creation. Currently Jero Romero runs a project of his own with great musicians and funded from crowdfunding help.

== Members ==
- Jero Romero (lead singer and acoustic guitar)
- Fausto Pérez (lead guitar)
- Miguel de Lucas (bass)
- Carlos Pinto (drums)
- Lyndon Parish (guitars, keyboards and backing vocalist)
- Julián Maeso (Hammond organ, Fender Rhodes, keyboards and backing vocalist) until 2007.

== Discography ==
=== Albums ===
- "The Sunday Drivers" (Rock Indiana, 2002)
- "Little Heart Attacks" (Mushroom Pillow, 2004)
- "Little Heart Attacks (International edition)" (Naïve, 2005)
- "Tiny Telephone" (Mushroom Pillow/Naïve, 2007)
- "The End of Maiden Trip" (Mushroom Pillow, 2009)

=== Singles ===
- "Time, time, time" (Rock Indiana, 2003)
- "On my mind" (Little hearts attacks, 2004)
- "Do it" (Tiny telephone, 2007)
- "My Plan" (2009)
