= Standstill (band) =

Spanish post-hardcore band

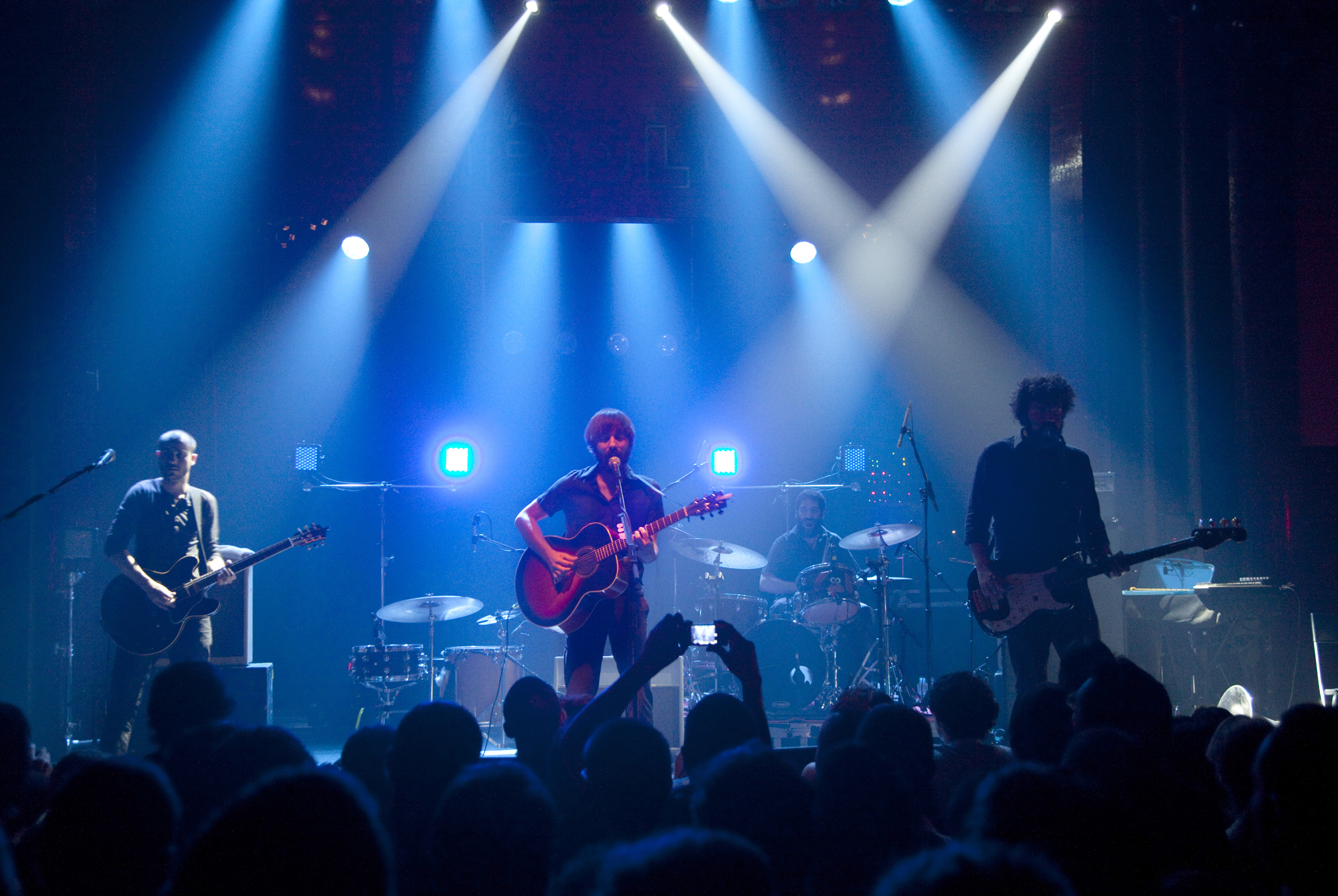
Standstill playing in Sala Apolo, Barcelona (2010).

Standstill is a Spanish post-hardcore-band from Barcelona, formed in 1995.

Outside of Spain, most of their albums were published by Defiance Records. In Spain, the band's label used to be BCore Disc until they decided to go fully DIY with 2006's Vivalaguerra.

== Discography ==
=== Albums ===
- 1998: The Tide
- 2001: The Ionic Spell
- 2002: Memories Collector
- 2003: The Latest Kiss
- 2004: Standstill (Defiance/ BCore)
- 2006: Vivalaguerra
- 2010: Adelante Bonaparte
- 2013: Dentro de la Luz

=== Singles ===
- Standstill / Engrave split 7-inch, Defiance
