= Love of Lesbian =

Spanish band from Catalonia

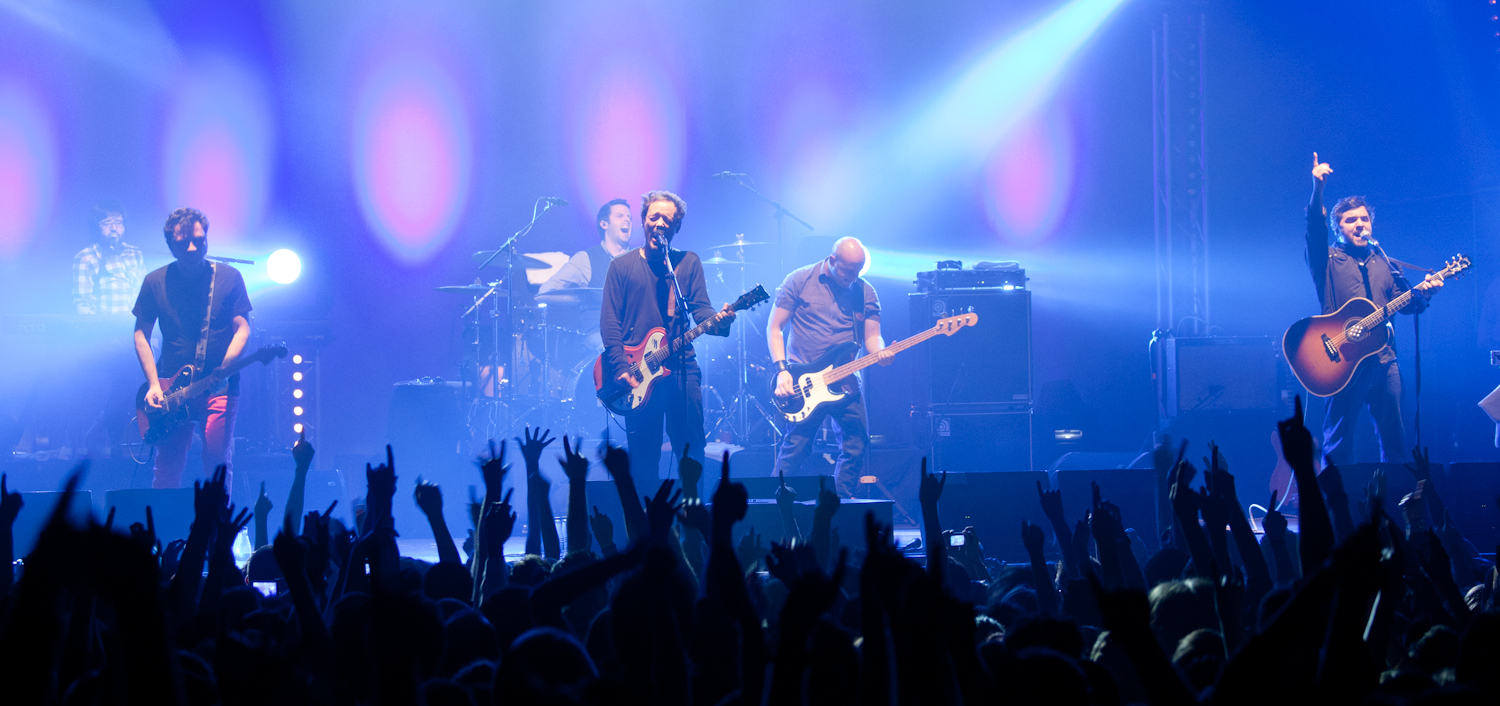
- Love of Lesbian

Background information
- Origin: Catalonia, Spain
- Genres: Indie pop, indie rock
- Years active: 1997–present
- Labels: Warner Music, Naïve, Rock K, Pussycats
- Members: Santi Balmes; Julián Saldarriaga; Jordi Roig; Joan Ramón Planell; Oriol Bonet
- Website: loveoflesbianband.com

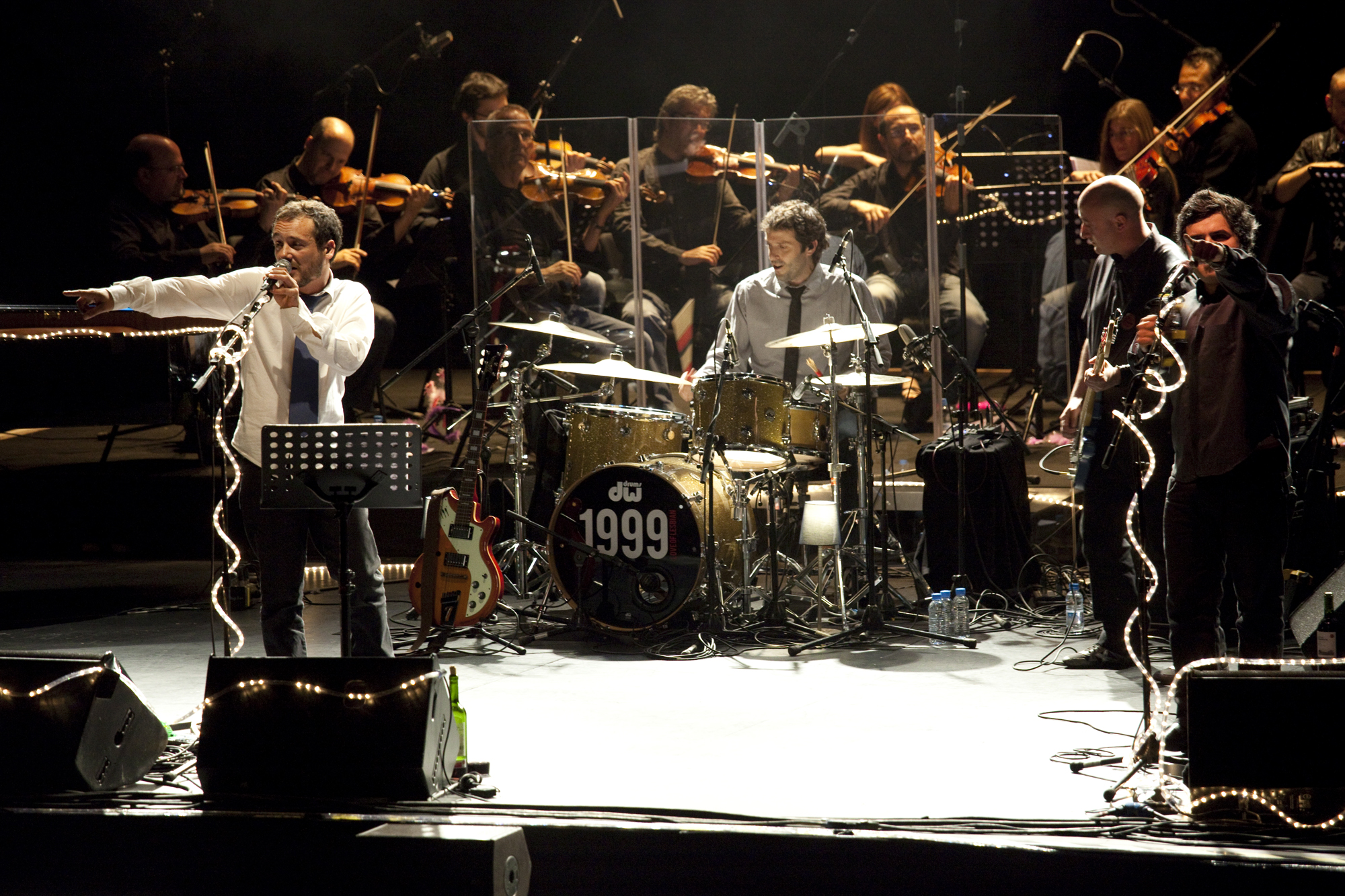
Love of Lesbian in concert in Sant Cugat del Vallès

Love of Lesbian is a Spanish indie pop band. They were nominated for the MTV Europe Music Award for Best Spanish Act at the 2012 MTV Europe Music Awards. Their album La noche eterna. Los días no vividos. reached number 1 in 2012.

On March 27, 2021, the band held the first large-scale concert in Spain as a test of reducing restrictions on large gatherings during the COVID-19 pandemic.

== Members ==
- Santi Balmes – vocals, guitar, piano, keyboards, synthesizers
- Oriol Bonet – drums, percussion, programming
- Joan Ramón Planell – bass guitar, synthesizers
- Jordi Roig – guitar, keyboards
- Julián Saldarriaga – guitar, synthesizers, sequencer, percussion, vocals

Touring members

- Dani Ferrer – keyboards, trumpet

== Discography ==
=== Albums ===
List of albums, with selected chart positions
Year	Album	Peak chart positions	Certifications
Year	Album	SPA	Certifications
1999	Microscopic Movies	—	
2002	Is It Fiction?	—	
2003	Ungravity	—	
2005	Maniobras de escapismo	—	
2007	Cuentos chinos para niños del Japón	—	
2009	1999 (O cómo generar incendios de nieve con una lupa enfocando a la luna)	33	SPA: Gold
2011	Últimos días de 1999: Aquellas noches de incendio (re-edition)	11	
2012	La noche eterna. Los días no vividos	1	
2014	Nouvelle Cuisine Caníbal	—	
2016	El Poeta Halley	1	
2018	El gran truco final	1	
2021	V.E.H.N (Viaje épico hacia la nada)	1	
2024	Ejército de salvación	1	
2026	Nouvelle Cuisine Canibal	21	

=== Singles ===
List of singles, with selected chart positions
Year	Title	Peak chart positions	Certifications	Album
Year	Title	SPA	Certifications	Album
2012	"Wio"	33		La noche eterna. Los días no vividos
2012	"El hambre invisible"	34		La noche eterna. Los días no vividos
2012	"Los seres únicos"	39		La noche eterna. Los días no vividos
2013	"Fantastic Shine"	3		
2014	"Manifiesto delirista"	38		
2016	"Bajo el volcán"	38		El Poeta Halley

=== Compilation albums ===
- Maniobras en Japón (2010, Music Bus/Warner Music)
- John Boy (2011, Warner Music)
- Últimos días de 1999: Aquellas noches de incendion (2011, Warner Music)

== Awards and nominations ==
Award	Year	Category	Nominated work	Result	Ref.
Latin Grammy Awards	2021	Best Rock Album	V.E.H.N (Viaje Épico Hacia la Nada)	Nominated	
Latin Grammy Awards	2021	Best Rock Song	"El Sur" (with Bunbury)	Nominated	
Latin Grammy Awards	2021	Best Pop/Rock Song	"Cosmos (Antisistema Solar)"	Nominated	
MTV Europe Music Awards	2012	Best Spanish Act	Love of Lesbian	Nominated	
MTV Europe Music Awards	2018	Best Spanish Act	Love of Lesbian	Nominated	
Premios Odeón	2022	Best Alternative Artist	Love of Lesbian	Nominated	
Premios Odeón	2022	Best Rock Song	"El Sur" (with Bunbury)	Nominated	
Premios Odeón	2022	Best Alternative Album	V.E.H.N (Viaje Épico Hacia la Nada)	Won	

Note: At the 17th Annual Latin Grammy Awards, Sergio Mora was nominated for Best Recording Package as the art director for El Poeta Halley.

== Videography ==
- "Freakie goes to Hollywood" (1999)
- "Is it fictions?" (2002)
- "Wasted days" (2002)
- "Domingo Astromántico"
- "Houston, tenemos un poema" (2005)
- "Universos Infinitos" (2007)
- "La Niña Imantada" (2007)
- "Noches Reversibles" (2007)
- "Me amo" (2007)
- "Allí donde solíamos gritar" (2009)
- "Club de fans de John Boy" (2009)
- "Cuestiones de familia" (2009)
- "Segundo Asalto" (2009)
- "Te hiero mucho" (2009)
- "1999" (2009)
- "Oniria e insomnia" (2012)
- "Si tú me dices Ben, yo digo Affleck" (2012)
- "Wío, antenas y pijamas" (2012)
- "Pizzigatos" (2012)
- "Los días no vividos" (2012)
- "Bajo el Volcán" (2016)
