= 2025 Premios de la Academia de Música =

2025 edition of the Premios de la Academia de Música

2nd Premios de la Academia de Música
- Date: 4 June 2025
- Venue: IFEMA Palacio Municipal, Madrid, Spain
- Hosted by: María Peláe; Rodrigo Cuevas

Highlights
- Most wins: Nathy Peluso (4)
- Most nominations: Valeria Castro (7)

Television/radio coverage
- Network: La 2 RTVE Play

The 2nd Premios de la Academia de Música took place on 4 June 2025 at IFEMA Palacio Municipal in Madrid, Spain, presented with the intention of recognizing the work of authors, artists, songwriters, and in general, all professionals involved in Spanish music releases of 2024. The ceremony was hosted by singers and musicians María Peláe and Rodrigo Cuevas, and was broadcast on La 2 and RTVE Play.

The submissions period began on 3 February, with almost 5000 entries being received. The nominees were announced on 4 April 2025. Singer-songwriter Valeria Castro led the nominations with seven, followed by Amaia, Nathy Peluso, La Plazuela, and Dani Fernández, all with four each.

Nathy Peluso was the most awarded with four wins. Amaia, Leiva, Rozalén, and Valeria Castro, also were multiple winners with three awards each.

== Winners and nominees ==
Nominees were announced on 4 April 2025. Winners are listed first and in bold.

=== General ===
**Artist of the Year**: **Rozalén**; Amaia; Carolina Durante; Dani Fernández; Zahara	**Album of the Year**: **La Jauría – Dani Fernández**; Alcalá Norte – Alcalá Norte; Bolsa Amarilla y Piedra Potente – Derby Motoreta's Burrito Kachimba; Elige Tu Propia Aventura – Carolina Durante; Nueva Sinfonía Sobre el Caos – León Benavente
**Song of the Year**: **"Tengo un Pensamiento" – Amaia**; "El último Día de Nuestras Vidas" – Dani Fernández; "La Soledad" – Valeria Castro; "La Vida Cañón" – Alcalá Norte; "Yo Solo Quería Escribir una Canción de Amor" – Zahara	**Best New Artist**: **Alcalá Norte**; Ángeles Toledano; Barry B; Marta Santos; Shego
**Songwriter of the Year**: **Amaia**; Carolina Durante; Dani Fernández; Valeria Castro; Zahara
**Best Tour**: **Gira 25 Aniversario Estopa – Estopa**; Aunque Estemos Muertos Tour – Coque Malla; Bellodrama Tour – Ana Mena; Cowboys de la A3 - Fin de Gira 2024 – Arde Bogotá; La Romería – Rodrigo Cuevas; Peregrino – Carlos Ares; Pura Sangre – Israel Fernández	**Best Music Event**: **Noches del Botánico**; Inverfest; La La Day; Música Desde el Corazón; She Sounds; Sonorama Ribera

=== Pop ===
**Best Pop Album**: **Estopía – Estopa**; Entre Cuatro Paredes y una Verdad – Marlena; Éxtasis – Edurne; Génesis – Ruslana; Insomnio – Abraham Mateo	**Best Traditional Pop Album**: **El Abrazo – Rozalén**; Todo es Posible en Navidad – David Bisbal; PaloSanto – NIA; Ayer... Aún – Raphael; Universo de Ley – Rosario	**Best Pop Song**: **"Tengo un Pensamiento" – Amaia**; "Ahí Estás" – Amaral; "En los Espejos" – Samuraï; "Loca x Ti" – KUVE; "Palmeras en el Jardín" – Alejandro Sanz

=== Urban / Rap ===
**Best Urban Music Album**: **Grasa – Nathy Peluso**; Costuras del Karma – Elane; La Favorita – LaBlackie; P.E.K.E. (Poca Estatura Korazón Enorme) – III Pekeño; Preludio – Recycled J	**Best Urban Song**: **"Manhattan" – Nathy Peluso & Duki**; "Kilometrocero" – Recycled J; "mil yardas" – ANADIE, El Virtual, Kfé & Bass Seismic; "Noti" – LaBlackie; "Qué Te Debo" – Lia Kali & Toni Anzis
**Best Fusion/Urban Performance**: **"TODO ROTO" – Nathy Peluso & Ca7riel & Paco Amoroso**; "Al Límite" – Ale Acosta & Juancho Marqués; "Colocón" – Dollar Selmouni & Lucas Otero; "Canto al Cansancio" – Bewis de la Rosa & Karmento; "Llorando en el Lambo" – Lerica, Mar de Lucas & Daviles de Novelda	**Best Rap/Hip Hop Song**: **"APRENDER A AMAR" – Nathy Peluso**; "Buscavidas" – III Pekeño, Ergo Pro & Dollar Selmouni featuring A.Dense; "Chevy Red" – Tote King & HOKE; "James Harden" – Cyril Kamer & Slayter; "Lo Que Sea" – Sara Socas

=== Electronic Music ===
**Best Electronic Music Album**: **Aquí y Ahora – Delaporte**; Barullo – Baiuca; La Caleta – La Plazuela; El Porvenir – Ale Acosta; Vapor y Cielo – Blackpanda	**Best Electronic Music Song**: **"La Ceniza" – Ale Acosta featuring Valeria Castro**; "Barullo" – Baiuca & Felisa Segade; "Mama Calling" – Buika & Kiko Navarro; "Mercurio" – Blackpanda; "Rumba de Los Bajos" – La Plazuela, David de Jacoba & Texture

=== Rock ===
**Best Rock Album**: **¡Ahora! – Biznaga**; Blissphony – Stoned At Pompeii; Cantares de Arcilla – Kike M; Bolsa Amarilla y Piedra Potente – Derby Motoreta's Burrito Kachimba; Progresa Adecuadamente – Gilipojazz	**Best Rock Song**: **"Gigante" – Leiva**; "El Entusiasmo" – Biznaga; "El Dios de América" – KING SAPO; "Franz Ferdinand" – Gilipojazz; "La Cara de la Muerte" – Kike M
**Best Pop/Rock Album**: **Un Lugar Perfecto – Depedro**; Bonita Resaca – 84; Contenido Sensible – Malva; Ignis – Vega; Tanto por Hacer – Cariño	**Best Pop/Rock Song**: **"El Hombre del Tiempo" – La La Love You**; "La Gloria" – Depedro; "La Herida" – Alberto & García featuring Kevin Johansen; "La Orilla" – Viva Suecia; "Leaks and Creaks" – Break the Senses; "Puentes" – Vetusta Morla

=== Alternative Music ===
**Best Alternative Music Album**: **La Caleta – La Plazuela**; La Llave de Ágora – Ágora Flamenco, Manuel Ángel Rojas Llano & Antonio Ortiz Vilchez; Sangre Sucia – Ángeles Toledano; Sinfonía – Jon Plágaro; Sinvergüenza – Muerdo	**Best Alternative Music Song**: **"Rumba de Los Bajos" – La Plazuela**; "Alma Vieja" – Emilia y Pablo; "Negro Infinito" – Maria Arnal featuring Ángela Molina; "SABROSURA" – Los Vinagres; "Sinvergüenza" – Muerdo & Eliades Ochoa

=== Flamenco ===
**Best Flamenco Album**: **Pepito y Paquito – Paco de Lucía & Pepe de Lucía**; 40 Años de Flamenco: En Directo – Carmen Linares; Callejón del Arte – David de Arahal; Concierto n° 1 Guitarra Flamenca: La Perla – Rycardo Moreno; Recordando a Marchena – Sandra Carrasco & David de Arahal	**Best Flamenco Song**: **"Pasodoble a José Tomas" – Vicente Amigo**; "De Tanto Rezarle al Santo" – Lela Soto & Rubén Martínez; "La Casada Infiel" – Antonio El Turry & Juan Carlos Garvayo; "Te Llevaste Mis Tormentos (Partía de Verdiales, Conciliación)" – María Terremoto; "Yo Voy a Perder el Sentío" – Israel Fernández & Antonio El Relojero

=== Singer-Songwriter ===
**Best Singer-Songwriter Album**: **El Abrazo – Rozalén**; Encore – Carmen Boza; Lentamente – Sílvia Pérez Cruz & Juan Falú; Parceiros, Vol. 2 – Pedro Guerra; Peregrino – Carlos Ares	**Best Singer-Songwriter Song**: **"La Soledad" – Valeria Castro**; "Madrid, Madrid" – Calequi y Las Panteras; "Peregrino" – Carlos Ares; "Sapiens" – Pedro Pastor & Los Locos Descalzos; "Silencio" – Ombligo & Alejandro y María Laura

=== Tradicional, Jazz, Children's Music and Instrumental ===
**Best Folk Album**: **La Serrana – Karmento**; Basal – A Pedreira; Cuero – Guada; Naranjas al Mar – Faneka; Néctar – Balkan Paradise Orchestra	**Best Jazz Album**: **Spain Forever Again – Michel Camilo & Tomatito**; Del Alma – Chicuelo & Marco Mezquida; La Salut i la Bellesa – Magalí Datzira; Nómadas – Lucía Rey; Timelapse – David Pastor
**Best Children's Music Album**: **Cuatro – Yo Soy Ratón**; Casi un Juguete – La Fantástica Banda; Jo, Tarzan (Banda Sonora Original) – Núria Sarró; Los órganos Cantan... y Cuentan: La Digestión – Ana Navarro Wagner; Yo Sí Sabo lo Que Quiero – Caracolino	**Best Instrumental Album**: **Spain Forever Again – Michel Camilo & Tomatito**; Dreams & Daggers – Nectar Project Music; Progresa Adecuadamente – Gilipojazz; Sisters of the Moon – Susana Gómez Vázquez; Symphonic Genesis – Orquesta Sinfónica RTVE; Juan J. Colomer (composer); Paco Moya (producer)

=== Visual Media ===
**Best Soundtrack Album**: **The Room Next Door – Alberto Iglesias**; The Asunta Case – Adrian Foulkes & Federico Jusid; The 47 – Arnau Bataller; They Will Be Dust – Maria Arnal; Salve Maria – Zeltia Montes	**Best Song Written for Visual Media**: **"El Borde del Mundo" from The 47 – Valeria Castro**; "Invisible" from Invisible – Siloé; "Negro Infinito" from They Will Be Dust – Maria Arnal featuring Ángela Molina; "Sensible" from Desde Nueva York – Vicente Alamo; "Un Premio" from Salve María – Zeltia Montes

=== Classical Music ===
**Best Classical Music Album**: **Lorquiana – Ana Valderrama (violin), Federico García Lorca (composer), Paco Moya (producer)**; Cello Concerto "Ekaitza" – Tres Sonetos de Michelangelo – Piano Concerto "Piscis" – Gabriel Erkoreka; Le Divin Poème – Josep Vicent, ADDA Simfònica & Fernando Arias; Reflets – Alba Ventura; Symphonic Genesis – Orquesta Sinfónica RTVE, Juan J. Colomer, IBS Classical & Paco Moya; XXIV Concurso Internacional de Piano de Ibiza – Hehuan Yu & Primer Premio	**Best Classical Music Composition**: **"Torre de La Calahorra" – Pepe Sánchez & Gerardo Núñez**; "Afilador" – Andrea Casarrubios; "Galdosiana" – Orquesta Sinfónica de Navarra; Lucía Marín (directora); Laura Vega (compositora); Paco Moya (productor); "Llanto por Ignacio Sánchez Mejías" – Tomás Marco; "Quietude" – Javier Márquez

=== Co-Official Languages ===
**Best Song in Catalan/Valencian/Aranese**: **"Sort de Tu" – Oques Grasses**; "Actitud" – Buhos; "Estaré Millor Demà" – Marlena & The Tyets; "La Marina Sta Morena" – Figa Flawas; "Rumba Catalan" – Alfred García	**Best Song in Basque**: **"Etxe Bat" – Gorka Urbizu**; "Ahizpa/Germana" – Judit Neddermann; "Berandu" – Ezpalak; "Haginekaz" – Maren; "Kantauri" – Süne; "Nola Hartu Arnasa" – Janus Lester	**Best Song in Galician/Asturian/Bable**: **"Catro Cousas" – Caamaño & Ameixeiras & Rodrigo Cuevas**; "A NOsa Verbena" – Ortiga; "Hi. My Love" – Sabela; "Pedindo Perdón" – Tanxugueiras; "Sísamo" – Baiuca; "Tes Que Ser de Aquí (Meigas)" – Miriam Rodríguez

=== Arrangement, Packaging and Production ===
**Best Arrangement**: **"Tengo un Pensamiento" (Live en La Revuelta) – Víctor Martínez, arranger (Amaia)**; Lorquiana: Canciones Populares Españolas – Alberto Martín Díaz, arranger (Ana Valderrama & David Kadouch); "Todo Lo Que Amaste" – Fernando Velázquez, arranger (Rozalén featuring Fernando Velázquez); "Hoy es Navidad" – Julio Jiménez Chaboli, arranger (Niña Pastori); Abuelo Bigote – María Toledo, arranger (María Toledo)	**Best Recording Package**: **El Último Día de Nuestras Vidas – Bego Martín, art director (Dani Fernández)**; Una Noche en el Botánico – Álvaro P-FF, art director (Rulo y la Contrabanda); La Caleta – Bandiz Studio, art director (La Plazuela); Pepito y Paquito – Emilio Lorente, art director (Paco de Lucía & Pepe de Lucía); Inteligencia Natural – NOCTURNA, art director (David Otero)
**Producer of the Year**: **Carlos Raya – "La Torre Picasso" (Arde Bogotá)**; Ale Acosta – El Porvenir (Ale Acosta); Alex Moreno, Pablo Fergus, Juan Aguirre & Eva Amaral – "Ahí Estás" (Amaral); Carles Campi Campón – "La Soledad" (Valeria Castro); Paco Salazar – La Jauría (Dani Fernández); Martí Perarnau IV – Nueva Sinfonía Sobre el Caos (León Benavente)	**Best Engineered Album or Song**: **"Hasta el Final" – José Nortes, Pablo Pulido, engineers (Coque Malla featuring Leiva)**; "La Soledad" – Carles Campi Campón, engineer (Valeria Castro); "Cuento de Hadas en Madrid" – José María Rosillo, Ángel Medina, Santos Berrocal, engineers (Iván Ferreiro); "Yo Solo Quería Escribir una Canción de Amor" – Martí Perarnau IV, Zahara, engineers (Zahara); La Jauría – Paco Salazar, Dave Kutch, Felipe Guevara, Pablo Pulido, Francisco Meneses, engineers (Dani Fernández)

=== Music video ===
**Best Music Video**: **"Gigante" – Leiva**; "COM ESTÀ EL PATI" – Oques Grasses; "Este Amor" – Elefantes; "Experiencia Religiosa" – Albert Pla; "Salud y Dinero" – Dollar Selmouni	**Best Long Form Music Video**: **The Flamenco Guitar of Yerai Cortés – Yerai Cortés**; "Elefantes y Amigos - Concierto Sonorama 2023" – Elefantes; Llámame Pepa – Marisol; Megamix Brutal; The Show – OCO; Vivir – Nino Bravo
