= 2024 Premios de la Academia de Música =

2024 edition of the Premios de la Academia de Música

1st Premios de la Academia de Música
- Date: 10 June 2024
- Venue: IFEMA Palacio Municipal, Madrid, Spain
- Hosted by: Abril Zamora; Andrea Guasch; Ángel Carmona; Johann Wald

Highlights
- Most wins: Arde Bogotá (6)
- Most nominations: Arde Bogotá (9)

The 1st Premios de la Academia de Música took place on 10 June 2024 at IFEMA Palacio Municipal in Madrid, Spain, presented with the intention of recognizing the work of authors, artists, songwriters, and in general, all professionals involved in Spanish music releases of 2023. The ceremony was hosted by actress Abril Zamora, singer Andrea Guasch, television and radio host Ángel Carmona, and television presenter Johann Wald.

Following the creation of the Academia de la Música de España (ACAMUS), an organization whose main objective is to promote Spanish music, it was announced that an annual awards ceremony would have its first edition in May 2024. The period for submissions extended from 14 to 29 February 2024.

The nominations were announced on 22 March 2024, with the rock band Arde Bogotá leading with nine nominations, followed by Sílvia Pérez Cruz with six, and Aitana and Quevedo, both with five each. While the category for Best Children's Music Album was among the awards set to be presented, no nominees were announced due to an insufficient number of entries.

== Winners and nominees ==
Nominees were announced on 22 March 2024. Winners are listed first and in bold.

=== General ===
**Artist of the Year**: **Arde Bogotá**; Aitana; Guitarricadelafuente; María José Llergo; Quevedo; Sílvia Pérez Cruz	**Album of the Year**: **Cowboys de la A3 – Arde Bogotá**; Boicot – Alizzz; ULTRABELLEZA – María José Llergo; Se Nos Lleva el Aire – Robe; Manual de Romería – Rodrigo Cuevas; Toda la Vida, un Día – Sílvia Pérez Cruz
**Song of the Year**: **"Los Perros" – Arde Bogotá**; "Madrid City" – Ana Mena; "¿Volverá?" – Coque Malla; "Me la Pegue" – Delaporte; "El Tonto" – Lola Índigo & Quevedo; "La Raíz" – Valeria Castro	**Best New Artist**: **Arde Bogotá**; Jimena Amarillo; La Plazuela; Tanxugueiras; Valeria Castro
**Songwriter of the Year**: **Iván Ferreiro (Song: "En las Trincheras de la Cultura Pop")**; Arde Bogotá (Song: "La Salvación"); Coque Malla (Song: "¿Volverá?"); María José Llergo (Song: "Superpoder"); Nathy Peluso (Song: "Salvaje"); Valeria Castro (Song: "La Raíz")
**Best Tour**: **Cuando Te Muerdes el Labio – Leiva**; La Romería – Rodrigo Cuevas; Cowboys de la A3 – Arde Bogotá; Contra Todo Pronóstico – Joaquín Sabina; Tinta y Tiempo – Jorge Drexler	**Best Music Event**: **Noches del Botánico**; Boombastic; Cooltural Fest; Inverfest; Sonorama Ribera 2023

=== Pop ===
**Best Pop Album**: **Bellodrama – Ana Mena**; αlpha – Aitana; Aldatu Aurretik – Bulego; El Dragón – Lola Índigo; Casi Perfecto – Nena Daconte	**Best Traditional Pop Album**: **Desbarajuste Piramidal – El Último de la Fila**; Doce – Jacobo Serra; La Ventana de Mi Alma – Luz Casal; Victoria Tour Edition – Raphael; Sonríe Porque Estás en la Foto – Sergio Dalma	**Best Pop Song**: **"El Paraíso" – Mikel Izal**; "Automóviles" – Besmaya; "Clavaito" – Chanel & Abraham Mateo; "La Ciudad Intermitente" – Gonzalo Hermida; "Salitre" – Manuel Carrasco & Camilo; "Mira Cómo Bailan" – Pablo López

=== Urban / Rap ===
**Best Urban Music Album**: **Donde Quiero Estar – Quevedo**; Casanova – Recycled J; DPQDP – Cano; Storm – Soge Culebra; Inkebrantable – SFDK	**Best Urban Song**: **"miamor" – Aitana & Rels B**; "Columbia" – Quevedo; "Generación Maldita" – Delarue; "150 Canciones" – Recycled J & Selecta; "No Pienso Llamar" – Soge Culebra
**Best Fusion/Urban Performance**: **"Péiname Juana" – La Plazuela**; "Generación Maldita" – Delarue; "Paris" – Ly Raine; "Antes" – RVFV; "Sin-Ceros" – SFDK	**Best Rap/Hip Hop Song**: **"Estrecho/Alvarado" – C. Tangana**; "ANBU" – Saske, Ergo Pro, III Pekeño, J. Moods; "Salvaje" – Nathy Peluso; "Ten Cuidao" – RVFV; "Sin-Ceros" – SFDK

=== Electronic Music ===
**Best Electronic Music Album**: **RONEO FUNK CLUB_REMIXED – La Plazuela**; αlpha – Aitana; De las Cenizas – Amatria; Duro – Natalia Lacunza; Réciprocité – Sparrow & Barbossa	**Best Electronic Music Song**: **"Los Ángeles" – Aitana**; "Ready" – Sila Lua; "Vagabundo" – Sparrow & Barbossa, Chico Castillo; "Química" – Mr. Pauer & Goyo; "Aralarko Dama" – Zetak

=== Rock ===
**Best Rock Album**: **Cowboys de la A3 – Arde Bogotá**; Aftermath – Angelus Apatrida; Se Nos Lleva el Aire – Robe; Vol. 2 – Tarque; El Amor de la Clase que Sea – Viva Suecia	**Best Rock Song**: **"Los Perros" – Arde Bogotá**; "Me Quedo con el Mal" – Johnny Garso; "El Poder del Arte" – Robe; "Confeti" – Rulo y la Contrabanda; "He Vuelto Para Veros Arder" – Tarque
**Best Pop/Rock Album**: **Trinchera Pop – Iván Ferreiro**; La Velada del Lobo – Ciudad Jara; Blockbuster – La La Love You; Que Se Caiga el Cielo – Marlon; 5 – Rulo y la Contrabanda	**Best Pop/Rock Song**: **"En las Trincheras de la Cultura Pop" – Iván Ferreiro**; "La Salvación" – Arde Bogotá; "Solo Tienes Que Avisar" – Dani Fernández; "El Principio de Algo" – La La Love You; "Brillante" – Repion

=== Alternative Music ===
**Best Alternative Music Album**: **RONEO FUNK CLUB – La Plazuela**; Casa Linda – Cala Vento; 10 Años de Flores, Viento y Fue – Muerdo; PO2054AZ (Vol.I) – Sen Senra; Sed – Triángulo de Amor Bizarro	**Best Alternative Music Song**: **"Péiname Juana" – La Plazuela**; "Fiebre" – Amaia; "Iker Ya No Me Debe un Café" – Gilipojazz; "Estrella Solitaria" – Triángulo de Amor Bizarro; "Fort Da" – Xoel López

=== Flamenco ===
**Best Flamenco Album**: **Pura Sangre – Israel Fernández**; Tamiz – Alejandro Hurtado; 50 Años de Cante – Enrique el Extremeño; Fértil – José Quevedo "Bolita"; Zarabanda – Sebastián Cruz; Estrella y Rafael – Estrella Morente & Rafael Riqueni	**Best Flamenco Song**: **"Al Tercer Mundo - Bulería" – Israel Fernández, Diego del Morao & Pional**; "Pólvora y Jazmín" – Blue Tomasa; "Amores" – Carmen Linares; "A José María" – Gerardo Núñez; "El Sabio" – Tomatito & Camarón de la Isla

=== Singer-Songwriter ===
**Best Singer-Songwriter Album**: **Toda la Vida, un Día – Sílvia Pérez Cruz**; Cosas de los Vivientes – El Kanka; LAR – Judit Neddermann; Parceiros Vol I – Pedro Guerra; Doce – Jacobo Serra; Cyclamen – Nuria Graham	**Best Singer-Songwriter Song**: **"Para Vivir" – El Kanka**; "Noche del Paragüay" – Calequi y Las Panteras & Myriam Latrece; "La Búsqueda de lo Imposible" – Jacobo Serra; "El Ángel Simón" – Nacho Vegas; "Abril y Mayo" – Valeria Castro

=== Tradicional, Jazz, Children's Music and Instrumental ===
**Best Folk Album**: **ULTRABELLEZA – María José Llergo**; Cantora – Alba Carmona; Mezcla Rica – Calequi y Las Panteras; Intrépido Viaje a Velocidad Cero – Ombligo; Manual de Romería – Rodrigo Cuevas	**Best Jazz Album**: **The Chick Corea Symphony Tribute – ADDA SINFONICA, Josep Vicent & Emilio Solla**; Rodizio Musical en Recoletos – Albert Sanz & Javier Colina; El Siempre Mar – Emilio Solla & Antonio Lizana; The Boss – Pepe Sanchez; Electrica – Trinidad Jiménez
**Best Children's Music Album**: No nominees or winner announced	**Best Instrumental Album**: **The Chick Corea Symphony Tribute – ADDA SINFONICA, Josep Vicent & Emilio Solla**; Dialegs per a Flauta y Clarinet – Elvira Querol & Severine Rospocher; Ecos de Breogán – Ira Folgado; Origin Works for Solo Violin – Lucía Veintimillia; Piano y Troba – Pepe Rivero

=== Visual Media ===
**Best Soundtrack Album**: **La mesías – Raül Refree**; Burning Body – Aitor Etxebarria; Strange Way of Life – Alberto Iglesias; The Tenderness – Fernando Velázquez; Awareness – Roque Baños	**Best Song Written for Visual Media**: **"El Amor de Andrea" from Andrea's Love – Vetusta Morla & Valeria Castro**; "Las Navas de Tolosa" from Los Caballeros de Santiago – Ainhoa Arteta & Miguel Poveda; "Suspiro Tierno" from Caged Wings – Ángeles, Víctor, Gloria & Javier; "Tout ou Rien" from Berlin – Pipo Romero; "Eco" from Friends Till Death – Xoel López

=== Classical Music ===
**Best Classical Music Album**: **Falla: Corregidor & Sombrero – Orquesta Filarmónica de Málaga**; Sixena – Capella de Minestrers Carlos Magraner; Dialegs per a Flauta y Clarinet – Elvira Querol & Severine Rospocher; Bach – Claudio Constantini; Niebla – Yhael May	**Best Classical Music Composition**: **"Aleluya" – Juan Antonio Simarro**; "Concierto de Yuste para Violín, Piano, Timbales y Arcos" – Eduardo Grau; "1936" – Lidia Pozo; "Umbral de la Desolación" – Tomás Marco Aragón; "En la Línea del Cielo" – AMP Classic All Stars & Pepe Sanchez Lianes; "Eixos Teus Ulls" – Ainhoa Arteta & Rodolfo Bada

=== Co-Official Languages ===
**Best Song in Catalan/Valencian/Aranese**: **"Ell no vol que el món s'acabi" – Sílvia Pérez Cruz**; "Els teus ulls" – Alfred García; "Mussegu" – Figa Flawas; "Ressaca a sa platja" – Maria Jaume; "Coti x Coti" – The Tyets	**Best Song in Basque**: **"Aralarko dama" – Zetak**; "Zure Begi Horiek" – Bulego; "Fandango Nasty" – Dupla; "Abendua" – Nøgen; "Hiri ilunen umeak" – Sara Azurza	**Best Song in Galician/Bable**: **"Oliveira dos cen anos" – C. Tangana**; "II. Lisístrata (Varre Vasoira)" – Fillas de Cassandra; "Romeiro aou lonxe" – Luar na Lubre; "Añada de Lea" – Nacho Vegas; "Aire" – Tanxugueiras

=== Arrangement, Packaging and Production ===
**Best Arrangement**: **"El Sabio" – Tomatito**; "Spain" – ADDA Sinfonica, Josep Vicent & Emilio Solla; "La Marimorena" – Demarco Flamenco; "Vicente" – María Toledo; "Flor de Olas" – Noriko Martín	**Best Recording Package**: **Toda la Vida, un Día – Sílvia Pérez Cruz**; Desbarajuste Piramidal – El Último de la Fila; Himnos de Guerra – Merino; La Palmera – Sexy Zebras; PaloSanto – NIA
**Producer of the Year**: **Coque Malla & José Nortes – Aunque Estemos Muertos (Coque Malla)**; Alba Reig – Al Baño María (María Peláe); Anxo Ferreira & Sen Senra – PO2054AZ (Vol.I) (Sen Senra); Daniel Ruiz & Víctor Cabezuelo – Septiembre (Mikel Erentxun); Eduardo Cabra – Manual de Romería (Rodrigo Cuevas); Ricky Falkner – Trinchera Pop (Iván Ferreiro); Ralphie Choo & Israel Fernández – "Platero" (Israel Fernández)	**Best Engineered Album or Song**: **Boicot – Alizzz (Alizzz)**; Aunque Estemos Muertos – José Nortes, engineer (Coque Malla); Trinchera Pop – Luis Antelo & Sergi Bautista, engineers (Iván Ferreiro); ULTRABELLEZA – Daniel Alanis, engineer (María José Llergo); "Shakira: Bzrp Music Sessions, Vol. 53" – Roger Rodes (Bizarrap featuring Shakira)

=== Music video ===
**Best Music Video**: **"Oliveira dos cen anos" – C. Tangana**; "Aunque Estemos" – Coque Malla; "Al Tercer Mundo" – Israel Fernández, Diego del Morao & Pional; "El Tonto" – Lola Índigo & Quevedo; "Toda la Vida, un Día" – Sílvia Pérez Cruz	**Best Long Form Music Video**: **Bailando Hasta el Apagón – Vetusta Morla**; Bisbal El Documental – David Bisbal; La Butxaca – LA KRUEL BAND; Bose Renacido – Miguel Bosé
