= Premios de la Academia de Música =

Spanish annual music award ceremony

- Current: 2026 Premios de la Academia de Música
- Awarded for: Outstanding achievements in the Spanish record industry market
- Location: Spain
- Presented by: Academia de la Música de España (ACAMUS)
- First award: 10 June 2024; 2 years ago
- Website: academusica.es/index

The Premios de la Academia de Música (Music Academy Awards in English) are an annual music ceremony destined to reward outstanding achievements in Spanish music. Presented by the Academia de la Música de España (ACAMUS), they serve as a continuation for the Premios Amigo, Premios de la Música, and Premios Odeón, which have been the main awards ceremony for Spanish music releases over the years.

The first edition of the awards took place at IFEMA Palacio Municipal in Madrid, Spain, on 10 June 2024, presenting a total of 43 categories.

== Background ==
From 1997 to 2007, Spanish music was recognized annually through the Premios Amigo, presented by the Sociedad General de Autores y Editores (SGAE) and the Autor Foundation, in collaboration with Sociedad de Artistas Intérpretes o Ejecutantes de España (AIE) and Productores de Música de España (PROMUSICAE). Simultaneously, the Premios de la Música were also presented by SGAE and AIE, held from 1997 to 2011. In 2020, the awards were merged into the Premios Odeón, organized by the previously mentioned entities in addition to the Asociación de Gestión de Derechos Intelectuales (AGEDI). These awards were presented from 2020 to 2023.

In 2001, SGAE and AIE created the Academia de las Artes y las Ciencias de la Música, which was in charge of organizing the Premios de la Música. After 2011, the awards were discontinued and the academy remained inactive until 2024, when it was renewed into the Academia de la Música de España. Hosted by Abril Zamora, Andrea Guasch, Ángel Carmona, and Johann Wald, the inaugural edition of the Premios de la Academia de Música were held at IFEMA Palacio Municipal in Madrid, Spain, on 10 June 2024. Spanish band Arde Bogotá was both the most awarded and nominated artist of the ceremony, with six wins out of nine nominations.

== Editions ==
No.	Date	Host(s)	Venue	Artist of the Year	Most awards	Most nominations	Ref.
1	10 June 2024	Abril Zamora, Andrea Guasch, Ángel Carmona and Johann Wald	IFEMA Palacio Municipal, Madrid	Arde Bogotá	Arde Bogotá (6)	Arde Bogotá (9)	
2	4 June 2025	María Peláe and Rodrigo Cuevas	IFEMA Exhibition Centre, Madrid	Rozalén	Nathy Peluso (4)	Valeria Castro (7)	
3	26 May 2026	Leonor Watling	IFEMA Exhibition Centre, Madrid	Rosalía	Rosalía (8)	Rosalía, Amaia, Leiva, and Guitarricadelafuente (8)	

== Categories ==
As of 2025, the following categories were presented:

General

- Artist of the Year
- Album of the Year
- Song of the Year
- Songwriter of the Year
- Best New Artist
- Best Tour
- Best Music Event

Pop

- Best Pop Album
- Best Traditional Pop Album
- Best Pop Song

Urban

- Best Urban Music Album
- Best Urban Song
- Best Fusion/Urban Performance

Rock

- Best Rock Album
- Best Rock Song
- Best Pop/Rock Album
- Best Pop/Rock Song

Alternative Music

- Best Alternative Music Album
- Best Alternative Song

Electronic Music

- Best Electronic Music Album
- Best Electronic Music Song

Rap

- Best Rap/Hip Hop Song

Traditional

- Best Folk Album

Co-Official Languages

- Best Song in Catalan/Valencian/Aranese
- Best Song in Basque
- Best Song in Galician/Asturian/Bable

Flamenco

- Best Flamenco Album
- Best Flamenco Song

Singer-Songwriter

- Best Singer-Songwriter Album
- Best Singer-Songwriter Song

Instrumental

- Best Instrumental Album

Jazz

- Best Jazz Album

Classical Music

- Best Classical Music Album
- Best Classical Music Composition

Visual Media

- Best Soundtrack Album
- Best Song Written for Visual Media

Children's Music

- Best Children's Music Album

Arrangement

- Best Arrangement

Recording Package

- Best Recording Package

Production

- Producer of the Year
- Best Engineered Album or Song

Music Video

- Best Music Video
- Best Long Form Music Video
