= Arroyo de Abejuela =

River in Spain

Coordinates: 38°23′N 1°58′W

Location
- Country: Spain
- Location: Province of Albacete, Spain

Physical characteristics
- Source
  - location: Calamorra
- Mouth
  - location: La Mora Brook

Basin features
- Progression: Letur and Ferez

Arroyo de Abejuela is a river of the Province of Albacete, Spain. It is a small river that crosses the municipalities of Letur and Férez. It is a tributary of the La Mora Brook.

== Course ==
In its upper course, it is usually dry during the summer. It begins under the Calamorra at an elevation of 961 metres (3,153 ft) and follows a northerly direction until reaching the village of Abejuela. Beyond the village, it turns west, below Bermeja (921), where there is a mill. It reaches the Férez Township, bordering the highlands of La Solana, to the north, before emptying into the La Mora stream.
