= Guitarricadelafuente =

Spanish singer and guitarist

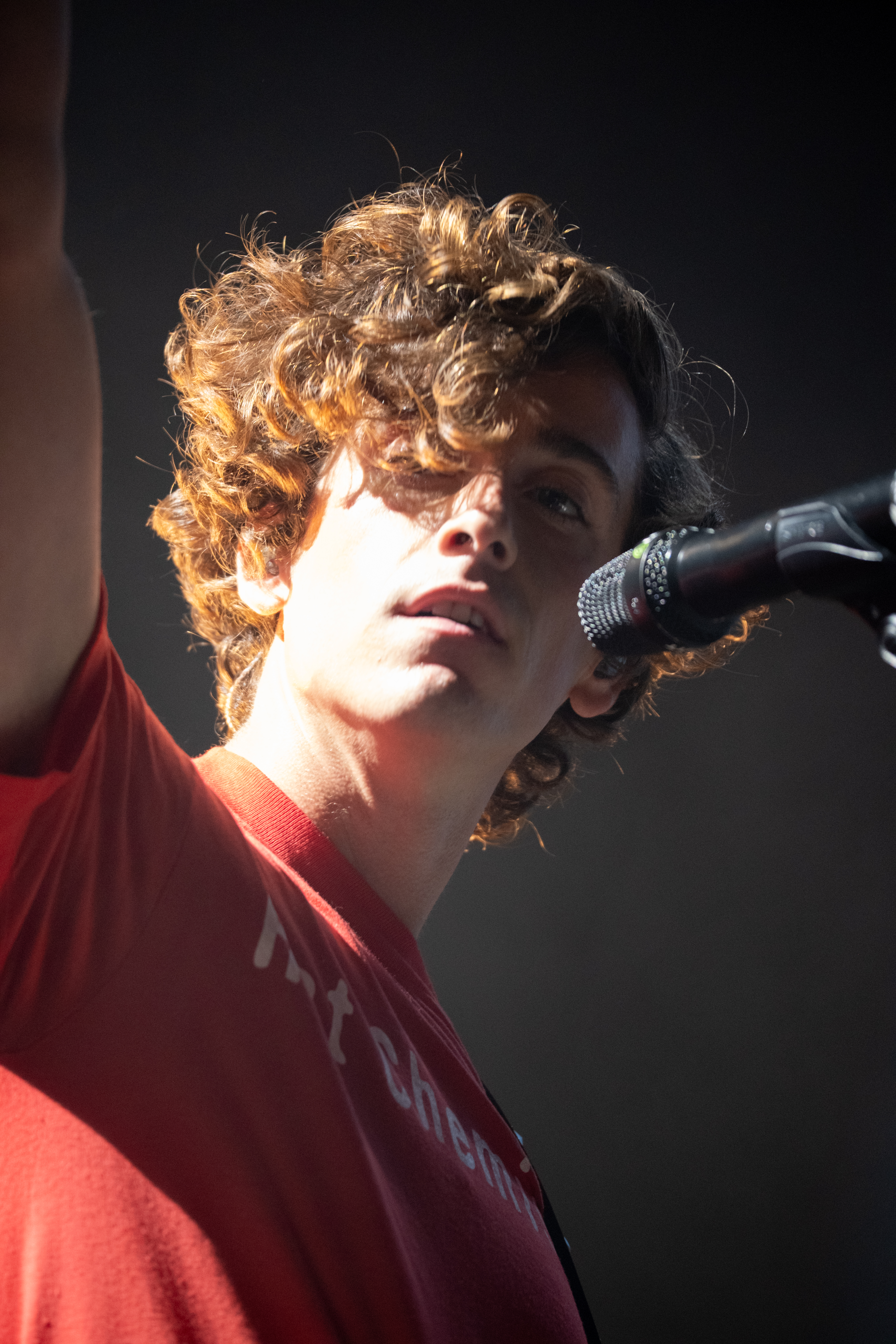
- Lafuente at the 2026 Montreux Jazz Festival
- Born: Álvaro Lafuente Calvo; 27 August 1997 (age 29); Benicàssim, Valencian Community, Spain
- Occupations: Singer; songwriter; guitarist; actor
- Years active: 2017–present
- Musical career
- Genres: New flamenco; chamber folk
- Label: Sony Music

Álvaro Lafuente Calvo (born 27 August 1997), known professionally as Guitarricadelafuente, is a Spanish singer-songwriter, guitarist and actor based in Barcelona. He began sharing cover versions of songs on Instagram in 2017. His style, which blends elements of indie folk, rumba, and flamenco, gradually attracted an audience.

In April 2018, Lafuente released his first original composition, "Conticinio", recorded at home with a PlayStation microphone. He reached a broader audience after collaborating with Operación Triunfo contestant Natalia Lacunza on her debut single, "Nana Triste", which reached number four on the Spanish singles chart. Following this success, he continued to issue singles independently.

The singer later signed with Sony Music, and released two albums: La Cantera (2022) and Spanish Leather (2025). Lafuente made his acting debut in 2026, starring in the Cannes Film Festival–winning film La bola negra, directed by Javier Calvo and Javier Ambrossi.

== Biography ==
Álvaro Lafuente Calvo was born on 27 August 1997 in Benicàssim, a small tourist-orientated village in the coast of the province of Castellón. During his teenage years, he spent a lot of time in Las Cuevas de Cañart, a 70-inhabitant rural town in the hills of the Sierra de Albarracín, where his grandmother lives. He received his first acoustic guitar on his fifteenth birthday and taught himself how to play. In 2017 he started posting covers of different Spanish-language songs on his social media profiles. That same year he started composing original songs with "El Conticinio" being the first one to be released on streaming platforms. He was contacted by the team of television talent competition La Voz through his Instagram messages to audition for the contest although he was never selected after accepting the opportunity. He also tried to participate in series nine of talent show Operación Triunfo which came back to television after a six-year hiatus. The singer is now based in Barcelona.

He is gay.

== Career ==
=== 2017–2018: Beginnings ===
Lafuente first started posting covers of different songs on YouTube and Instagram in 2017. His mix of modern and antique musical arts attracted multiple people. He was asked by the team of La Voz to audition for the television contest but didn't make it to the show. In December 2017 he played his first official concert at La Rockeria, a small musical bar in Valencia. Throughout 2018 he continued posting covers and original songs on different streaming platforms and played a couple concerts in the Valencian Community and Madrid. In 2018, he also collaborated with Balcony TV, a Catalan web platform that serves as a showcase for emerging artists which has also collaborated with artists like C. Tangana, Eurovision performer Alfred García or global pop phenomenon Rosalía back in the day. In October 2018 he posted four songs on Spotify, "Guantanamera", "Sixtinain", the previously released "El Conticinio" and a cover of Manuel Vallejo's 1926 track "Catalina" and continued promoting them in local radios and free performances in local parks. He left university after changing his specialisation three times (first architecture, then cinema and then a degree in design) to focus on his music.

=== 2019–2020: Breakthrough and La Cantera ===
In January 2019, he sang the main song for the movie "Nada Será Igual" and started a small tour which he named "La Girica" a month later. The tour visited selected musical bars in a couple of cities. On 5 June he posted the music video for "Guantanamera" directed by Pedro Artola on YouTube, this being his first music video. That same month he performed two sold-out shows at Galileo Galilei, a 500-capacity musical venue in the centre of Madrid. He also opened the show for Diego el Cigala at the Jardins de Pedralbes festival in Barcelona and performed for the first time on television in the musical segment of La 2 evening newscast. That same day, 14 June, his collaboration with friend Natalia Lacunza was released for digital download through Universal Music. Lacunza had participated in the tenth edition of the Spanish televised musical contest Operación Triunfo which had an average audience of two million people. Thus, her first single, "Nana Triste", which features Guitarricadelafuente, became a must-listen song in Spain thanks to its high expectancy. The music video for "Nana Triste" was viewed more than a million times in its first 24 hours and peaked at number four on the PROMUSICAE chart, the organisation responsible for the Spanish Albums Chart. The song charted for 18 consecutive weeks, leaving the chart in December 2019. Thanks to the success of the collaboration, his song "Guantanamera" peaked at number 69 and spent 3 weeks on the chart. Lafuente became extremely popular and performed in several national festivals throughout the year in Valladolid and Galicia. He also expanded his tour and performed sold-out concerts in Castellón, Málaga, Granada, Murcia and Barcelona between others, all of them being sold-out. On 17 August 2019 he performed a whole concert at Las Cuevas de Cañart's old monastery ruins which, following his words, has been his most emotional and special concert to date.

The singer collaborated with Muerdo on his album "Fin de la Primera Vida", which was released in January 2020. He also covered "Cerrado Por Derribo" alongside Niño de Elche for Joaquin Sabina's tribute album "Ni Tan Joven Ni Tan Viejo" which was a best-selling album that topped the album charts for several weeks. In 2020 he extended his national tour and scheduled two concerts in Mexico which had to be postponed due to the COVID-19 pandemic. Other shows in theatres in Spain were cancelled or rescheduled. That same year he was also nominated for three MIN awards for "Best New Artist", "Best Music Video" for "Guantanamera" and "Song of the Year" for "Agua Y Mezcal". These awards congratulate independent music performers. In January 2020 he collaborated with Mexican musician Silvana Estrada on the acoustic remix of "Guantanamera".

Recording sessions for his debut album (then planned as an EP) began in October 2019. On 3 April 2020 he released "Desde las Alturas" which has been confirmed to be the first single of the album, which is scheduled to be released in late 2020 although the recording sessions have been stopped due to the ongoing pandemic. The album is being produced by Raúl Lamina and Refree, who has worked with Rosalía and Amaia among others. The release of the songs ends his droplet no-radio impact era where he released "Nacido Pa Ganar", "Agua Y Mezcal" and "ABC" in June and September 2019 respectively.

=== 2026: La Bola Negra ===
In 2026, Guitarricadelafuente made his acting debut as the lead in the Spanish epic drama La Bola Negra, which premiered at the Cannes Film Festival in May, where the directors, Javier Calvo and Javier Ambrossi, won the Best Director prize. The film — inspired by the life and work of Federico García Lorca — followed the lives of three intertwined gay men, each set in a different timeline; Lafuente played Sebastián, a village trumpeter who is forced to become a Nationalist soldier in the Spanish Civil War in 1937. Calvo and Ambrossi discovered Lafuente when he was on stage with Troye Sivan at Primavera Sound in Barcelona and approached him with the project. They "sad musician eyes" made him perfect for the role, despite his lack of acting experience. He also wrote an original song for the film, "La Nieve," which plays during a pivotal scene.

== Artistry ==
Lafuente has been cited as "an old soul based in the hills of Aragón with Andalusian air and with a Valencian heart; an old soul, that has no other explanation for a sensitivity typical of the greats of Spanish-Latin music". The singer describes his music as "real music, with truth and without any arrangement or production; with clear and concise messages that I didn't realise could touch the hearts of this many people"; he states that "there is no songwriting process in my songs, they occur to me on the go".

The singer has cited urban artists like Nathy Peluso or Bad Gyal as major influences for his songs. He gets inspired by their persona rather than their musical genre. He has also stated that he listened a lot to Loquillo and Extremoduro while growing up but doesn't think that it will influence his music. He has also cited South American culture as a major influence by saying, "I like all the Southern American imagery, it is a very rich and colorful culture. Very nice to tell. With many stories, it transmits a lot".

== Discography ==
=== Studio albums ===
List of studio albums, with selected details, chart positions, and certifications
Title	Details	Peaks	Certifications
Title	Details	SPA	Certifications
La Cantera	Released: 6 May 2022; Label: Sony Music Spain; Format: LP, CD, digital download, streaming	3	
Spanish Leather	Released: 16 May 2025; Label: Sony Music Spain; Format: LP, CD, digital download, streaming	3	

=== Extended plays ===
List of studio albums, with selected details, chart positions, and certifications
Title	Details
Caramullo	Released: 16 December 2022; Label: Sony Music Spain, De Esta Edición; Format: LP, CD, digital download, streaming

=== Singles ===
List of singles as lead artist, showing year released, selected chart positions, certifications, and originating album
Title	Year	Peak chart positions	Certifications	Album
Title	Year	SPA	Certifications	Album
"Guantanamera"	2018	69	PROMUSICAE: 2× Platinum	Non-album single
"Catalina"	2018	—		Non-album single
"Sixtinain"	2018	—		Non-album single
"Agua y Mezcal"	—			Non-album single
"ABC"	—			Non-album single
"Nacido Pa Ganar"	—			Non-album single
"Desde las Alturas"	2020	79	PROMUSICAE: Gold	Non-album single
"Ya Mi Mamá Me Decía"	2020	60	PROMUSICAE: Platinum	La Cantera
"Conticinio"	2020	—		Non-album single
"Límite" (with Feten Feten)	2020	—		Non-album single
"Mil y una Noches"	2021	—	PROMUSICAE: Gold	La Cantera
"Vidalita del Mar"	2022	—		La Cantera
"Quién Encendió la Luz"	2022	—		La Cantera
"A Mi Manera"	2022	—		Non-album single
"Romancera"	2023	—		Non-album single
"Sidekick" (with pablopablo)	2024	—		Non-album single
"Full Time Papi"	2025	97		Spanish Leather
"Futuros Amantes"	2025	—		Spanish Leather
"Tramuntana"	2025	—		Spanish Leather
"Pipe Dream"	2025	—		Spanish Leather
"Babieca!"	2025	58		Spanish Leather
"Calypso"	2026	—		Non-album single
"La Nieve"	2026	—		La Bola Negra Soundtrack

=== Collaborations and other charted songs ===
List of singles as lead artist, showing year released, selected chart positions, certifications, and originating album
Title	Year	Peak chart positions		Certifications	Album
Title	Year	SPA	NZ Hot	Certifications	Album
"Nana Triste" (featuring Natalia Lacunza)	2019	4	—	PROMUSICAE: 3× Platinum	Non-album single
"Vas a Encontrarte" (with Muerdo)	2019	—	—		Non-album single
"Cerrado por Derribo" (with Niño del Elche)	2019	—	—		Non-album single
"Góndolas" (with Nostalgia.en.los.autobouses and Raül Refree)	2020	—	—		Non-album single
"In My Room" (with Troye Sivan)	2023	—	9		Something to Give Each Other
"Santiago de chile" (with Akriila)	2026	—	—		Lucy miró al mundo y notó que está girando

== Filmography ==
Year	Original title	English title	Role	Director(s)	Notes
2026	La bola negra	The Black Ball	Sebastián Azcuna	Javier Calvo & Javier Ambrossi	

== Awards and nominations ==
Name of the award ceremony, year presented, nominee(s) of the award, award category, and the result of the nomination
Award ceremony	Year	Category	Nominee(s)/work(s)	Result	Ref.
Esquire Men of the Year Awards	2023	Musical Innovation	Guitarricadelafuente	Won	
Latin Grammy Awards	2023	Best Short Form Music Video	"A Carta Cabal"	Nominated	
Latin Grammy Awards	2025	Best Short Form Music Video	"Full Time Papi"	Nominated	
Premios de la Academia de Música	2024	Artist of the Year	Guitarricadelafuente	Nominated	
Premio Ruido	2022	Best Album from Spain	La Cantera	Nominated	
Rolling Stone en Español Awards	2023	Album of the Year	La Cantera	Nominated	
Rolling Stone en Español Awards	2023	Song of the Year	"¿Quién Endendió la Luz?"	Nominated	
Rolling Stone en Español Awards	2023	Promising Artist of the Year	Guitarricadelafuente	Nominated	
Rolling Stone en Español Awards	2023	Video of the Year	"Mil y Una Noches"	Nominated	
UK Music Video Awards	2025	Best Cinematography in a Video – Newcomer	"Babieca!"	Nominated	

== Tours ==
Headlining

- La Girica (2019–20)
- La Cantera Tour (2022–23)
- Spanish Leather Tour (2025-26)
