= Cariño (disambiguation) =

Cariño may refer to:

- Cariño, a municipality in the province of A Coruña in the autonomous community of Galicia in northwestern Spain
- Cariño (band), Spanish pop-rock band
- Cariño (restaurant), in Chicago, United States
- "Cariño" (song), song recorded by American singer Jennifer Lopez
- Cariño, Paniqui, Tarlac, one of the 35 barangay of the municipality of Paniqui

== People ==
- Carino of Balsamo, murderer of Saint Peter of Verona and a Dominican lay brother
- Alberta Cariño, the director of CACTUS, a community organization in Oaxaca, Mexico.
- Bugoy Cariño (born 2002), Filipino child actor and dancer
- Joanna Cariño (born 1951), Filipino human rights activist and educator
- Ledivina V. Cariño (1942-2009), Filipino sociologist and political scientist
- Nestor Cariño (1938–2025), Filipino Roman Catholic prelate
- Mateo Cariño (1841-1908), Ibaloi chieftain
