= Rozalén =

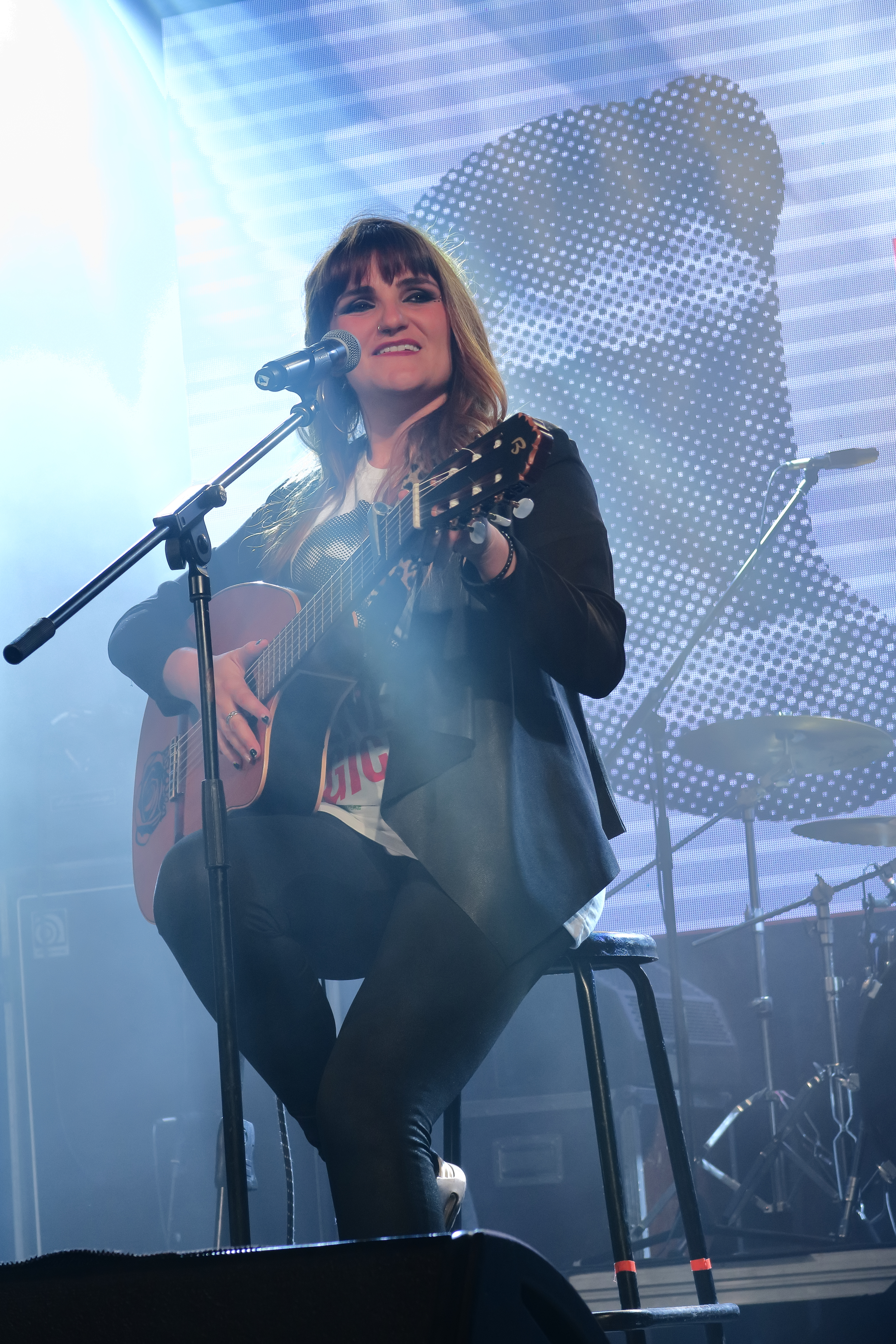
- Rozalén at the Greenpeace concert in Madrid 2018.
- Born: María de los Ángeles Rozalén Ortuño; 12 June 1986 (age 40); Albacete, Spain
- Education: University of Murcia
- Occupations: Singer; songwriter
- Years active: 2012–present
- Height: 1.68 m (5 ft 6 in)
- Musical career
- Genres: Pop; Rock; Folk
- Instruments: Vocals; Guitar; Bandurria
- Label: Sony Music
- Website: www.rozalen.org

María de los Ángeles Rozalén Ortuño (born 12 June 1986 in Albacete, Spain) known professionally as Rozalén is a Spanish singer and songwriter.

== Life ==
She grew up in Letur.

She studied psychology at the University of Murcia with a master in music therapy.

She has collaborated with social organizations and NGOs like Plan Internacional, AECC or Fundación Vicente Ferrer.

On 6 February 2021 she won the Goya Award for her song "Que no, que no".

== Discography ==
=== Albums ===
- Con derecho a…, 2013
- Quién me ha visto... , 2015
- Cuando el río suena... , 2017
- El Árbol y el Bosque, 2020
- Matriz, 2022
- El abrazo, 2024

=== Singles ===
- 80 veces, 2013
- Comiéndote a besos, 2013
- Saltan chispas, 2014
- Vuelves, 2015
- Ahora, 2015
- Será mejor, 2016
- Girasoles, 2017
- La puerta violeta, 2017
- Antes de verte, 2018
- Aves enjauladas, 2020
- Te Quiero Porque Te Quiero featuring Rodrigo Cuevas, 2022
- Amor del Bo featuring Silvia Pérez Cruz, 2022
- A Virxe Do Portovello featuring Tanxugueiras, 2022

== Books ==
- Cerrando puntos suspensivos, 2018

== Awards and nominations ==
Award	Year	Category	Nominated work	Result	Ref.
Latin Grammy Awards	2018	Album of the Year	Cuando el Río Suena...	Nominated	
Latin Grammy Awards	2018	Song of the Year	"La Puerta Violeta"	Nominated	
Latin Grammy Awards	2021	Best Singer-Songwriter Album	El Árbol y el Bosque	Nominated	
Latin Grammy Awards	2024	Best Singer-Songwriter Album	El Abrazo	Pending	
Latin Grammy Awards	2024	Best Singer-Songwriter Song	"Entonces"	Pending	
The Latin Recording Academy	2025	Leading Ladies of Entertainment	Rozalén	Won	
Goya Awards	2020	Best Original Song	"Que No, Que No" (from Rosa's Wedding)	Won	
Goya Awards	2022	Best Original Song	"En los Márgenes" (from On the Fringe)	Nominated	
