= Fillas de Cassandra =

Galician musical duo

- Origin: Vigo, Galicia, Spain
- Genres: Folk, Electronic, Pop
- Years active: 2022–present
- Label: Altafonte
- Members: María Pérez (María SOA); Sara Faro

Fillas de Cassandra (Galician: "Daughters of Cassandra") is a Galician musical duo formed in 2022, composed of María Pérez (also known as María SOA; born Vigo, 1996) and Sara Faro (born Vigo, 2001). Their music combines Galician traditional music with electronic pop, classical influences, and feminist lyrical themes drawn from Greek mythology.

== Formation ==
The duo formed in Vigo after meeting at an event organized by Feminismo Unitario, a feminist platform based in the city, to which both had been invited to perform separately. Pérez proposed that they perform a song together, and after an impromptu joint performance the two decided to formalize a partnership. Their first official concert as Fillas de Cassandra took place on 25 November, the International Day for the Elimination of Violence Against Women, at an event organized by the Vigo city council.

They adopted the name Fillas de Cassandra before having released any recorded material together.

== Musical style ==
Fillas de Cassandra's sound has been described by the artists themselves as "electronic pop music of traditional roots with vocal harmonies" (música pop electrónica de raíz con harmonías vocais). Their compositions draw on the repertoire of Galician oral tradition, including forms associated with cantareiras and pandereteiras (traditional female singers and frame drum players), blended with electronic production, piano, and contemporary pop structures.

Sara Faro plays voice and percussion, principally the pandeireta (a Galician frame drum); María Pérez plays voice, percussion, and piano. The duo conceive of their live performances in theatrical terms, with choreographed movement between instruments and deliberate staging.

Their stated musical influences in the traditional sphere include Xosé Lois Romero e Aliboria, Leilía, Baiuca, and the album Contrapunto by Tanxugueiras. In harmony they cite Baroque music as a reference, and in electronic production they name Rosalía and Bad Gyal.

== Discography ==
=== Acrópole (2023) ===
Fillas de Cassandra released their debut album Acrópole in February 2023, produced by Berto (of the Galician duo Verto) and released through Tremendo Audiovisual under the cooperative label Nave de Lata. The album consists of ten tracks, each named after a figure from Greek mythology — Cassandra, Antigone, Lysistrata, Pandora, Echo, the Moirai, Daphne, and Syrinx — and uses these mythological frameworks to draw parallels between the experiences of women in antiquity and those of women in the present.

The album was launched with a concert on 4 March 2023 at the Sala Capitol in Santiago de Compostela. Prior to the album's release, the duo had built an audience entirely through live performance, having given approximately fifteen concerts without any recordings available on streaming platforms.

The first single released from the album was "II. Lisístrata (Varre Vasoira)", published on 9 September 2022, along with the track "Antígona".

=== Hibernarse (2025) ===
In 2025, the duo released Hibernarse, an expanded project in EP, fanzine, and film format, described as a reflection on the creative pause necessary between artistic processes.

=== Tertúlia (2026) ===
In 2026, Fillas de Cassandra released their second full-length album, Tertúlia, with shared musical production by Çantamarta and distributed through Altafonte. The album is described as exploring everyday life, evoking the informal sociability of neighborhood conversation and communal dancing.

== Awards and recognition ==
In 2022, the song "II. Lisístrata (Varre Vasoira)" won the VIII Premio aRi[t]mar for Best Music of the Year in Galicia, an award determined by public vote. That edition received 6,792 votes, an increase of approximately 30 percent from the prior year.

In 2024, Fillas de Cassandra received the Premio Rosa dos Ventos from the Instituto Santiago Apóstol in Buenos Aires, Argentina. The award is granted annually by the school's final-year students to a person or entity demonstrating outstanding merit in the defense of Galician cultural identity. The citation recognized the duo for the dignification of traditional Galician culture through an approach described as modern and appealing to new generations. Previous recipients include Carlos Núñez (2015), Ana Peleteiro (2020), Tanxugueiras (2022), and Xabier Díaz (2023).
