= Cariño (band) =

Spanish pop band

- Origin: Lavapiés, Madrid, Spain
- Genres: Pop; Indie pop; pop-punk
- Years active: 2017–present
- Labels: Elefant; Universal
- Members: Paola Rivero; Alicia Ros; María Talaverano

Cariño is a Spanish pop and rock band, formed in 2017. The band is made up of Paola Rivero, Alicia Ros and María Talaverano.

== History ==
Cariño was formed in 2017, when Rivero and Talaverano met on Guapa, a dating app for women. At this point, Rivero already played the drums and was just starting to learn how to play the guitar. After an El Buen Hijo concert, Rivero and Talaverano stopped bassist Alicia Ros and proposed that she join their band.

One evening at their friend’s house--producer Martín Vial-- took the lyrics Maria Talaverano wrote and created the base, while each member sang. Talaverano already had a name for this project, Cariño. Alicia accepted their invitation to join the band if she was able to be a vocalist along with being their bassist. She officially joined the band in February, 2018.

The group began by sharing home-recorded songs, two of which, Bisexual and Mierda Seca, would later form part of their mini-LP, entitled Movidas and published in November 2018 by the record label Elefant Records. In 2020, they published their second single, X si dejas me en visto, with the record label Sonido Muchacho.

On 7 January 2020, it was announced that Cariño would be participating in the Coachella festival. The festival was cancelled due to the COVID-19 pandemic, and Cariño did not perform there until their appearance in 2022.

== Artistry ==
Cariño's sound has been described as pop, indie pop, and pop-punk. They have stated that they were influenced by musical groups such as Juniper Moon, La Casa Azul and Los Fresones Rebeldes.

== Discography ==
=== Studio albums ===
- 2018 – Movidas
- 2022 – Cariño
- 2024 – Tanto Por Hacer
