= Los Fresones Rebeldes =

Spanish indie pop band

- Origin: Barcelona, Spain
- Genres: Indie pop Twee pop Pop-punk
- Years active: 1995–2001, 2014–2016, 2019, 2022–present
- Labels: Subterfuge; Spicnic
- Members: Joaquín Felipe Spada; Ana Vaquero; Roge; Quinito
- Past members: Eugènia Broggi; Cecilia Bayo; Eva María González Viejo; Inés Bayo; Cristina Segura; Sergi Farregut Gallès; Miguel López Blanco

Los Fresones Rebeldes is a Spanish indie pop band formed in Barcelona in 1995. The group drew on influences from the 1960s, punk, new wave, C86, and riot grrrl. They formed at the height of the indie explosion in Spain.

== Career ==
Miguel López Blanco (keyboards and Casiotone), a veteran of the 1980s group Síndrome Tóxico, was looking for a drummer for a new project when he crossed paths with his brother's best friend: Joaquín Felipe Spada, former guitarist of Los Canguros and Los Bretones. Together they decided to form a group called Pepito Sex. Cristina Segura then joined them, and the three founded Thy Surfyn' Eyes, but Miguel decided that Felipe and Cristina were not at his level and dismissed them from the group to continue on his own.

Felipe and Cristina continued rehearsing on their own until Miguel rejoined them, and together they decided to found Los Fresones Rebeldes alongside three other women in their twenties: Eugènia Broggi, Inés Bayo, and her sister Cecilia. Felipe, a civil servant at the Provincial Council of Barcelona and former political journalist for the Diario de Barcelona, and Miguel, a geology teacher, later admitted: "Los Fresones happened almost by accident, and look, it worked."

At Christmas 1996 they recorded their first single, Al amanecer, with Spicnic, a small label from Albacete founded by brothers Mauro and Nacho Canut. Subterfuge Records then took an interest in them, leading to a three-way arrangement: singles were released on Spicnic. At the same time, albums went to Subterfuge. They had previously contributed a track to the compilation Freaks Attacks, and in late 1997 released their debut album ¡Es que no hay manera! (Subterfuge, 1997), recorded in the summer of that year.

Al amanecer, accompanied by a playful music video shot at the Parque de Atracciones de Madrid, received wide airplay on various radio stations. The album also featured singles including La inocente and Quiero saber. Around this time, they also won a contest organized by Philips and Los 40 Principales.

In 1999 the band released their second album, Éxitos 99. Los Fresones Rebeldes reunited in June 2014 to perform at the 25th anniversary celebration of their label Subterfuge, held in Madrid.

== Discography ==
=== Albums ===
- ¡Es que no hay manera! (1997)
- Éxitos 99 (1999)
- Gran Selección 1995–2001 (2003)

=== Singles ===
- Al amanecer (1997)
- Bola de cristal (1997)

=== EPs ===
- Tributo a Pepito Sex y Thy Surfyn' Eyes (1998)
- Creo que me quiere (1998)
- Medio drogados (1999)
- Amor y tonterías (2022)

=== Tribute album ===
- Yo fui un Fresón Rebelde adolescente (2025) — a Spanish-Mexican tribute album to Los Fresones Rebeldes
