= Invisible (miniseries) =

2024 Spanish drama TV series

- Genre: Drama; Fantasy
- Created by: Virginia Yagüe Jota Linares Paco Caballero
- Based on: Invisible (Author: Eloy Moreno)
- Screenplay by: Virginia Yagüe Gonzalo Bendala Jota Linares Celia de Molina
- Directed by: Paco Caballero
- Music by: Fernando Velázquez
- Country of origin: Spain
- Original language: Spanish
- No. of seasons: 1
- No. of episodes: 6

Production
- Cinematography: David Valldepérez
- Running time: 50 minutes

Original release
- Network: Disney+
- Release: 13 December 2024

Invisible is a 2024 Spanish drama television series about a twelve-year-old boy who has suffered a terrible accident that has left him with severe post-traumatic stress disorder. It was produced by Morena Films and Áralan Films, and premiered on Disney+ on 13 December 2024.

== Plot ==
The story follows Capi, a 12-year-old boy who, after a traumatic accident, discovers that he is able to make himself invisible. This gift, at first fascinating, quickly becomes a burden as he confronts the isolation and responsibilities that come with his power. The series tackles profound themes of rejection, identity and coming-of-age, in a production that promises to be as emotional as it is gripping.

== Cast ==
- Eric Sejio as Chico Invisible
- Aura Garrido as La Profesora
- Miki Esparbé as El Psicólogo
- David Verdaguer as Dragón
- Diego Montejo as MM
- Alejandro Gasco as Jairo
- Izan Fernández as Zaro
- Nicolás Costi as Nacho
- Liv Dobner as Kiri
- Iñaki Godoy as '" *antagonist* "'
