= Akriila =

Chilean rapper and singer

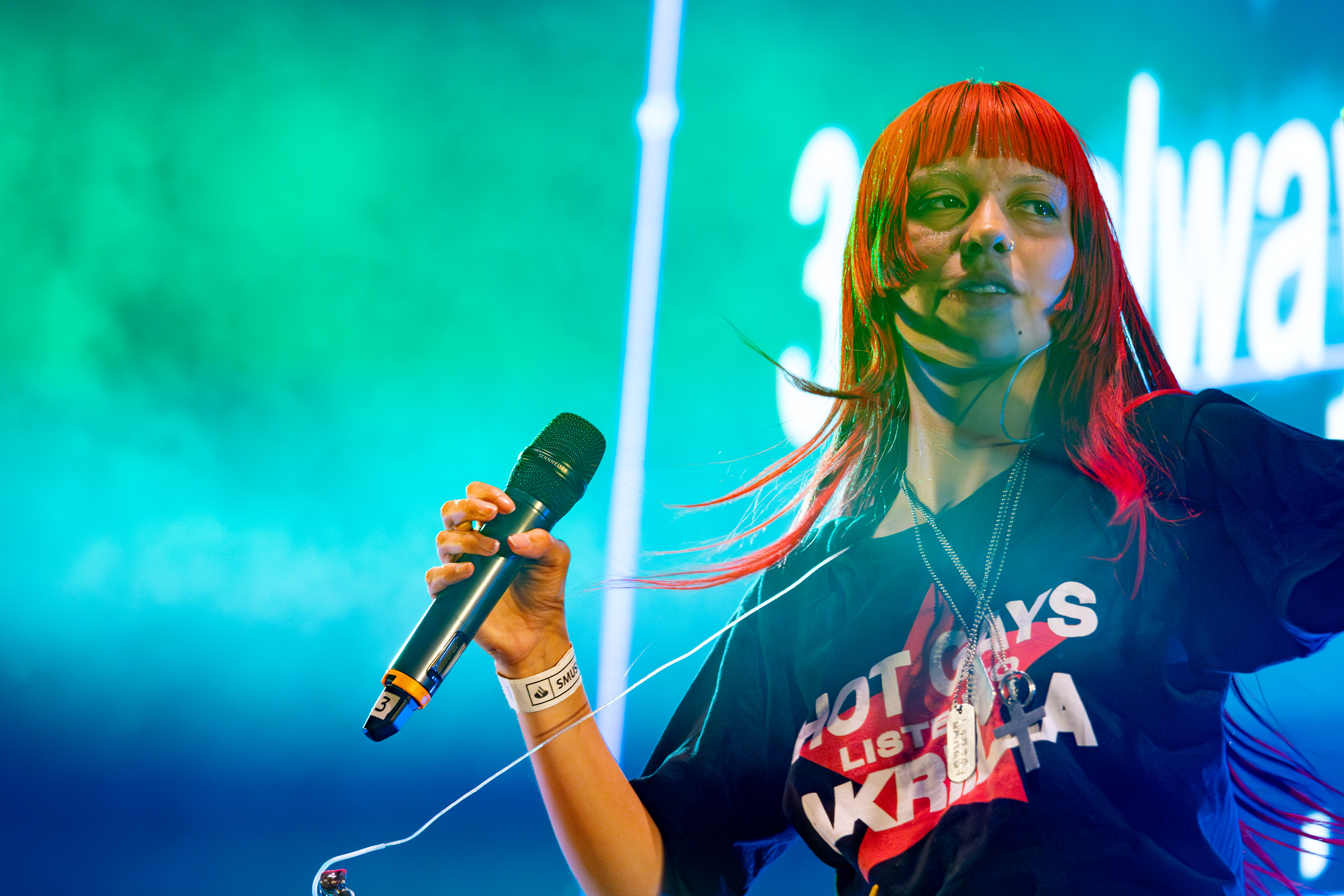
- Akriila performing live at Madrid Pride 2025.

Background information
- Born: October 17, 2003 (age 22); Maipú, Chile
- Genres: Plugg; pop; reggaeton; Digicore
- Occupations: Rapper; singer-songwriter
- Years active: 2020–present
- Labels: Atlantic; Warner

Fernanda Patricia Sepúlveda Tapia (born October 17, 2003 in Maipú, Chile), better known under her stage name Akriila (stylized in all-uppercase) or Akri, is a Chilean singer-songwriter and rapper based in Santiago.

After gaining a following through her singles and mixtape, Sepúlveda released her debut album, epistolares, in 2024, following it up with a deluxe version the next year. Recurring themes in her music include love, sex and heartbreak.

== Early life ==
Sepúlveda was born in Maipú and grew up in Santiago. Her mother is a preschool educator and her father was a university professor. While she had sometimes written songs for her then girlfriend, Sepúlveda only started to take music serious amid the COVID-19 pandemic, which broke out while she was in high school. She bought a microphone and recorded herself in her mother's car. Around this time she said she was inspired by mixtapes from Chilean singers Princesa Alba and Gianluca. Sepúlveda's father and older sister play instruments and she herself plays the guitar.

== Career ==
She uploaded her first song, "Dando Vuelta", to the internet in 2020. In 2022 Sepúlveda was surprised to find out she was set to perform at Primavera Sound Chile without being informed before the lineup was posted online. After the release of several more singles and a mixtape called 001 in the following years, Rolling Stone noted a pivot in Sepúlveda's music from trap to a more "commercial reggaeton sound" in early 2024.

Sepúlveda released her debut album, Epistolares, in August 2024 after working on it since at least early 2023. The album's sound has been described as a blend of alternative pop, reggaeton and drum & bass, "capturing the spirit of contemporary Latin music while pushing sonic boundaries." A deluxe version of the album, entitled Epistolares+, was released the following year, adding collaborations with artists such as BB Trickz and Latin Mafia. When asked about the influences on epistolares by Rolling Stone, Sepúlveda mentioned Caprisongs, Motomami, Arca and Julieta Venegas, among others.

In 2024 Akriila performed at both Lollapalooza Chile and Argentina. The production company behind the festivals also runs the record label Lotus Records, who Sepúlveda is signed with.

In 2025 Sepúlveda collaborated with record producer and label head Dinamarca, resulting in the 3-track EP headphones !. Sepúlveda described it as heavily inspired by Dinamarca's usual sound, with her influence on the project being felt most in the hard-hitting percussive elements.

In 2026 Sepúlveda announced her sophomore album, Lucy miró al mundo y notó que está girando.

== Critical reception ==
In a profile written for Revista Anfibia, Raimundo Flores Sierralta called Sepúlveda one of the most important emerging artists. He draws a connection between her eclectic taste and access to the internet and notes left-wing political ideas in the lyrical content of her songs.

== Style and influences ==
Sepúlveda described her creative project as consisting of "60% music and 40% visual". As a child Sepúlveda was a fan of K-pop, leading to her watching a lot of anime in her early teens and describing herself as "the anime girl" in her school. This, alongside pop-punk music and culture, has influenced her eventual visual style and fashion sense, she says. Among her favorite anime are Another and Nana. Her decision to dye her hair red followed a desire to distinguish herself. The hair color has since become one of her trademarks.

Describing her relationship with her music being identified with the genre of trap, she has said that she thinks of her music primarily as pop, putting herself into a broader modern pop umbrella alongside artists such as Charli XCX, Rosalía and Tokischa. In comparison to trap, plugg music is "romantic and dreamy", according to Sepúlveda.

Sepúlveda has mentioned Japanese contemporary artist Yayoi Kusama as a creative influence. She has also shared that FKA Twigs' 2022 mixtape Caprisongs played a big part in her musical trajectory.

== Discography ==
=== Albums ===
- 2024 – epistolares
- 2026 – Lucy miró al mundo y notó que está girando

=== Mixtapes ===
- 2023 – 001

=== EPs ===
- 2024 - 4EVER FERIADO
- 2025 – headphones ! (with Dinamarca)

=== Singles ===
The following list excludes singles which are released in the rollout of and included on an album or mixtape for legibility.

- 2020 – "Dando Vuelta"
- 2020 – "VELOUR"
- 2021 – "ya no cuento el 8"
- 2021 – "XEKERAU"
- 2021 – "si algún dia soy>
- 2022 – "SAINT V"
- 2022 – "Blue V2"
- 2022 – "MONA XINA"
- 2023 – "VATA"
- 2023 – "e-mail"
- 2023 – "tú no"
- 2023 – "nunca es lo mismo y.y"
- 2024 – "arreglo floral" (with Kidd Voodoo)
- 2024 – "lunes feriadooOoOO"
- 2024 – "POPPER!" (with TAICHU)
- 2024 – "para siempre (。˃﹏˂)"
- 2026 – "suave" (with Jane Remover)
- 2026 – "roger"
- 2026 – "partedemipartedeti"
