= Valeria Castro =

Spanish singer-songwriter (born 1999)

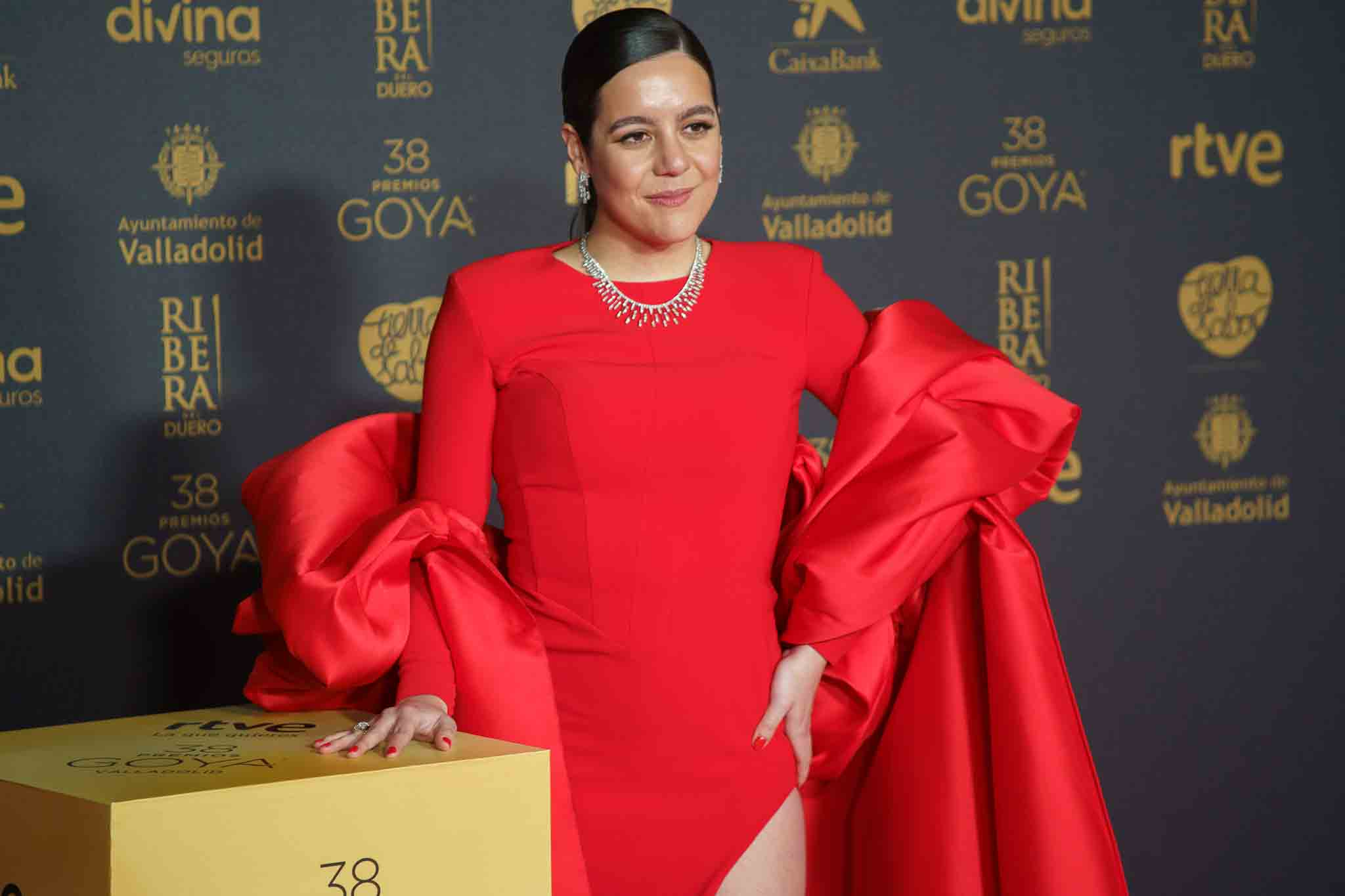
- Castro in 2024

Background information
- Born: Valeria Castro Rodríguez; 28 April 1999 (age 26); Los Llanos de Aridane, La Palma, Canary Islands, Spain
- Genres: Flamenco; indie folk; alternative rock
- Occupations: Singer; songwriter
- Instrument: Vocals

Valeria Castro Rodríguez (born 28 April 1999) is a Spanish singer and songwriter. In 2023, she was nominated for the Latin Grammy Awards in the Best Singer-Songwriter Song category for "La Raíz", a song composed for the island of La Palma after the Cumbre Vieja volcano erupted in 2021. She was the winner of the award for Best Song of the Year at the 2023 Canarian Music Awards and nominated for the 2024 Goya Awards in the category of Best Original Song together with the band Vetusta Morla for "El Amor de Andrea".

== Early life ==
From a very young age, Castro began to show a great interest in music, at the age of 4 she began to play the piano and sing. She began her training at the Insular School of Music of La Palma. She studied biotechnology at the Polytechnic University of Madrid, studies that she combined with her love of music.

== Career ==
In 2021, Castro published her first EP "chiquita" (Warner Music). In 2023, she released her first LP "con cariño y con cuidado" (self-published), a work that she presented in several countries during the year of its release and for which she received a multitude of awards, including the third best national album of 2023 by the specialized magazine Mondo Sonoro and one of the 10 best albums of the year according to El País.

During 2023, Castro sold out tickets in large theaters throughout the Spanish national territory, performing in places such as the Real Jardín Botánico de Madrid within the framework of the Noches del Botánico festival, as well as the Teatro Circo Price. That year she also performed at the Mercedes-Benz Fashion Week in Madrid, lending voice to the fashion show of designer J.C. Pajares.

Castro has collaborated both in the studio and live with artists such as Alejandro Sanz, Vetusta Morla, Silvana Estrada, Sílvia Pérez Cruz, Iván Ferreiro, Vicente García, Viva Suecia, Macaco, Tanxugueiras, Pedro Guerra, Daniel, Me Estás Matando and Isaac Et Nora among others. Some of her songs have been featured on the soundtracks of renowned series or films such as Elite and Caged Wings. She has also provided image and voice for campaigns for multinational brands such as the Japanese Uniqlo and the French Decathlon.

== Discography ==
	Year	Title	Notes
Studio albums	2023	con cariño y con cuidado	
EPs	2021	chiquita	
Singles	2021	la corriente	
Singles	2021	guerrera	
Singles	2022	la raíz	
Singles	2022	poquito	
Singles	2023	lo que siento	
Singles	2023	abril y mayo	
Singles	2023	costumbre	
In collaboration	2021	La Despedida	with Colectivo Panamera
In collaboration	2021	Tierra y Fuego	with Muerdo y Pedro Guerra
In collaboration	2022	Un Recuerdo	with Macaco
In collaboration	2023	Palmero Sube a La Palma	with Isaac et Nora
In collaboration	2023	Hablar de Nada	with Viva Suecia
In collaboration	2023	El Amor de Andrea	with Vetusta Morla
In collaboration	2023	Hoxe, Mañá e Sempre	with Tanxugueiras

== Awards and honors ==
Year	Awards	Category	Result
2022	Premio Taburiente		Won
2023	Latin Grammy Awards	Best Singer-Songwriter Song	Nominated
2023	Canarian Music Awards	Best Song	Won
2023	Canarian Music Awards	Best New Artist	Nominated
2024	Goya	Best Original Song	Nominated
2024	Latin Grammy Awards	Best Latin Electronic Music Performance	Nominated
