= Letur =

Coordinates: 38°22′N 2°06′W

- Municipality
- Coat of arms

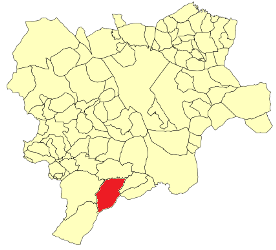
- Country: ESP
- Autonomous community: Castile-La Mancha
- Province: Albacete
- Mancomunidad: Sierra del Segura

Government
  - Mayor: Carmen Álvarez López (PP)

Area
  - Total: 263.56 km^{2} (101.76 sq mi)
- Elevation: 720 m (2,360 ft)

Population (2025-01-01)
  - Total: 911
- Postal code: 02434
- Area code: 967

Letur is a municipality in the province of Albacete, in the autonomous community of Castile-La Mancha, Spain. To the south, it borders the Murcia Region (Moratalla Township). It has a population of 1,285, according to INE.

== Districts ==
The municipality of Letur is made up of the following districts:

- Abejuela
- La Dehesa
- La Sierra

== Feasts ==
=== Holy Week ===
- Holy Thursday - Procession of Our Father Jesus of Nazareth and Holy Mary of Sorrows.

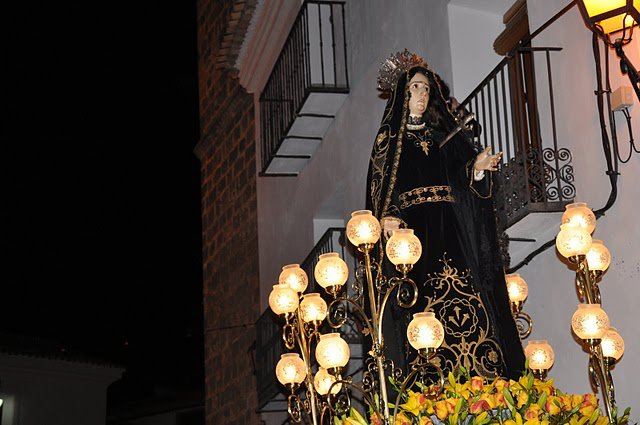
Holy Mary of Sorrows

- Holy Friday in the afternoon - The "Funeral" procession.
- Holy Friday in the night - The "Silence" procession.
- Holy Friday at 6:00 am - Our Lord leaves from the Church of Our Lady of the Assumption of Letur and walks through the streets of the old town, afterwards Our Lady leaves, to cross the path of our Lord in the Plaza Mayor, where the "encounter" takes place.

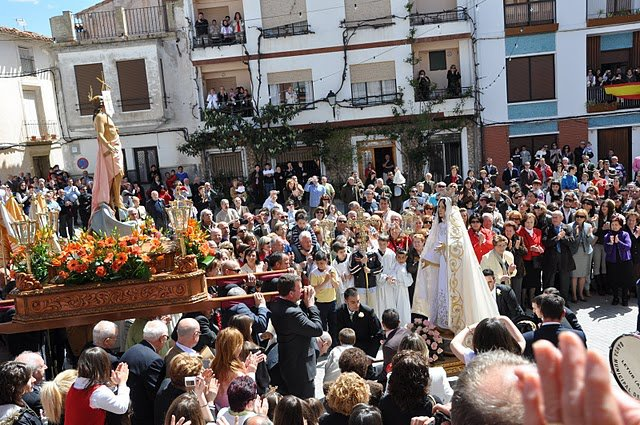
Letur's Resurrection Sunday's "Las Cortesias" Procession

- Resurrection Sunday - Letur's "Las Cortesias" Procession. This famous celebration is held in Plaza Mayor and white doves are released. The procession starts at around 11:30 a.m., first Our Lady of Sorrows leaves dressed in mourning, she passes behind the Town Hall and the Arc of Moreras and climbs up to the Plaza Mayor. At the same time Our Father also comes from this church to the Plaza Mayor where the meeting takes place, followed by the anthem of Spain.
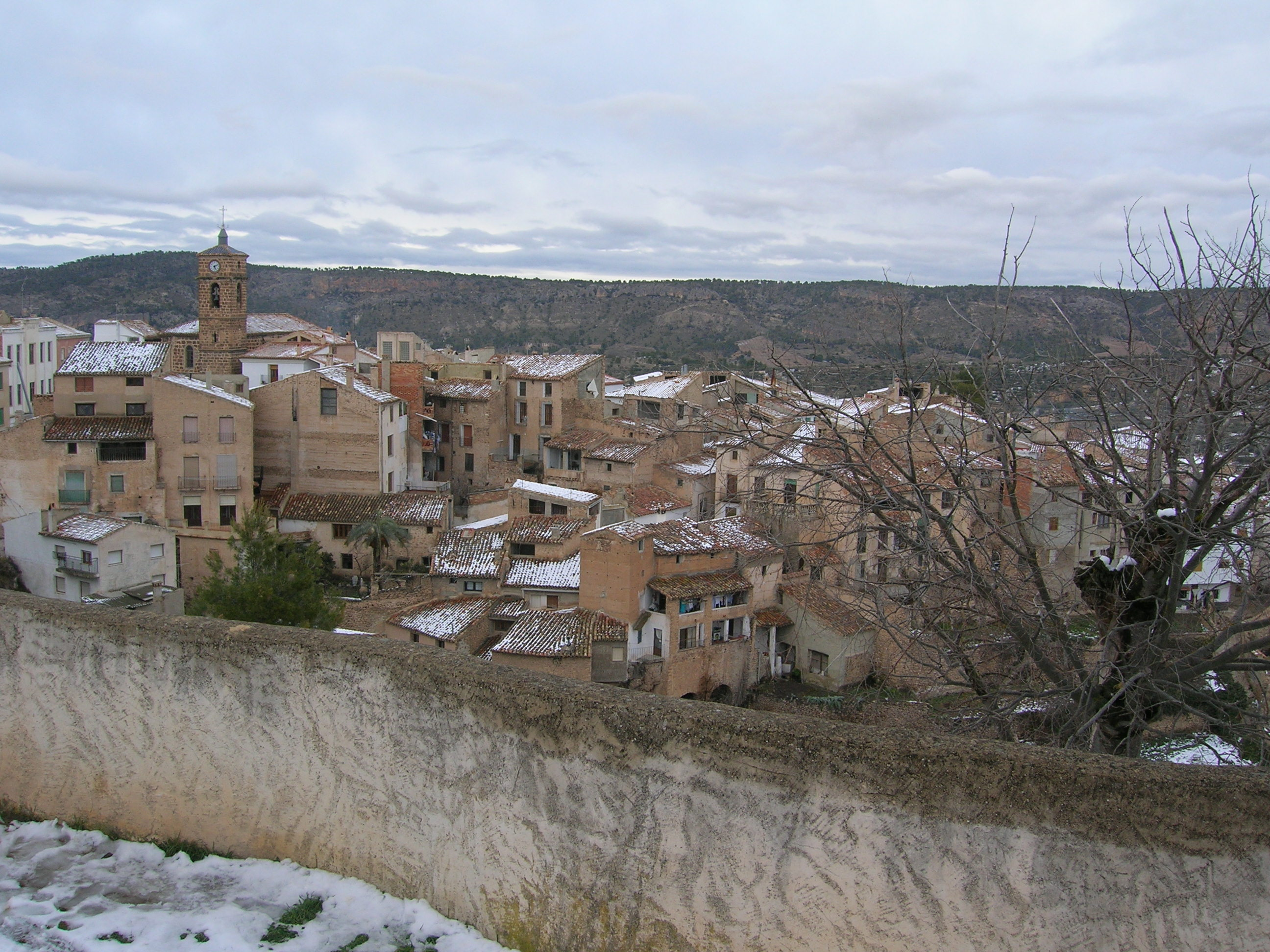
Gerenal view

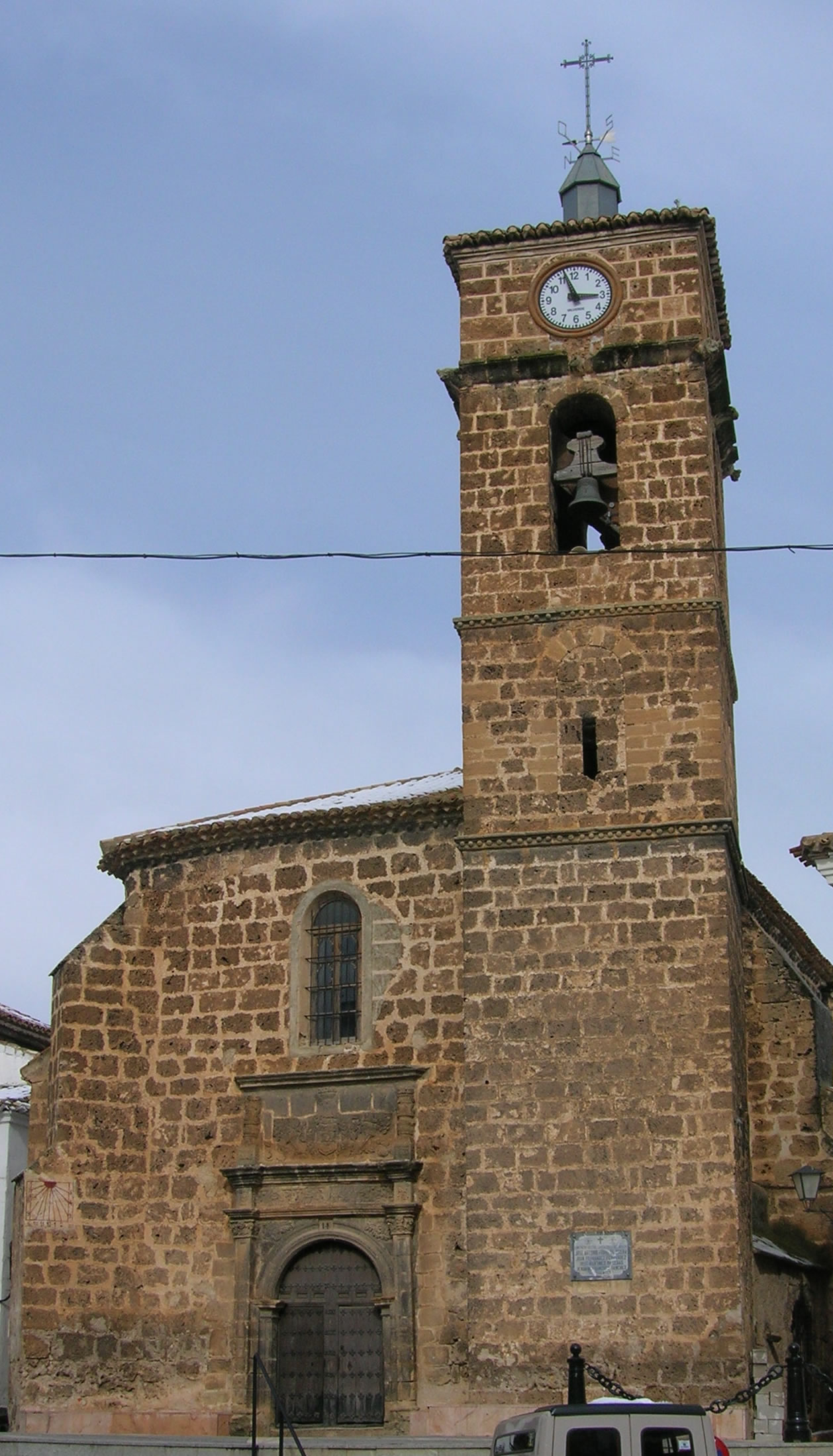
Letur Church

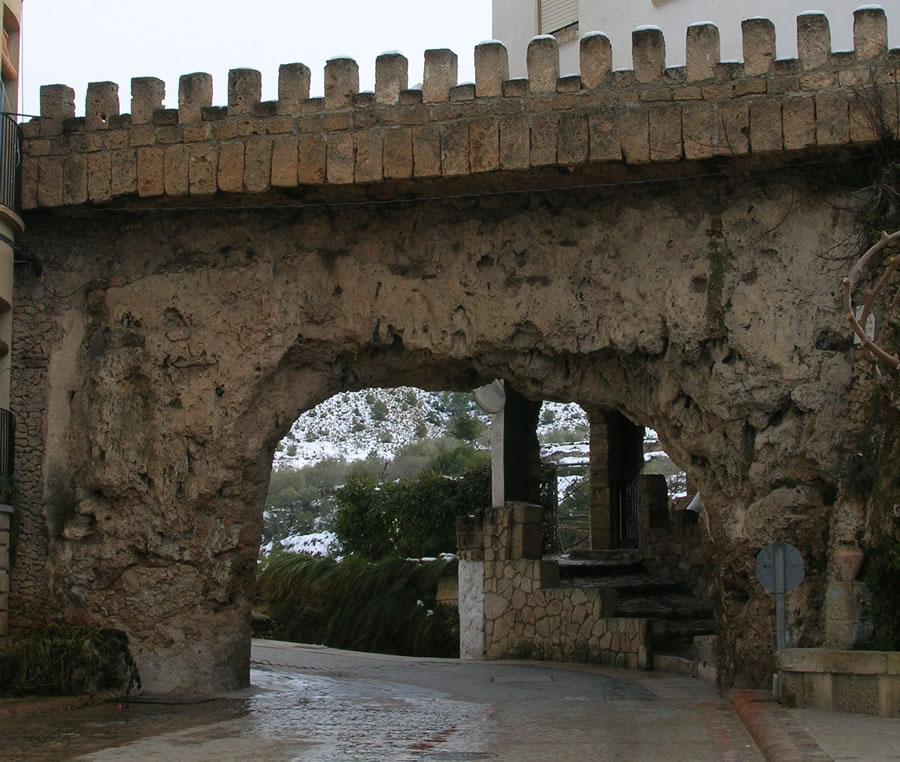
The Town Walls

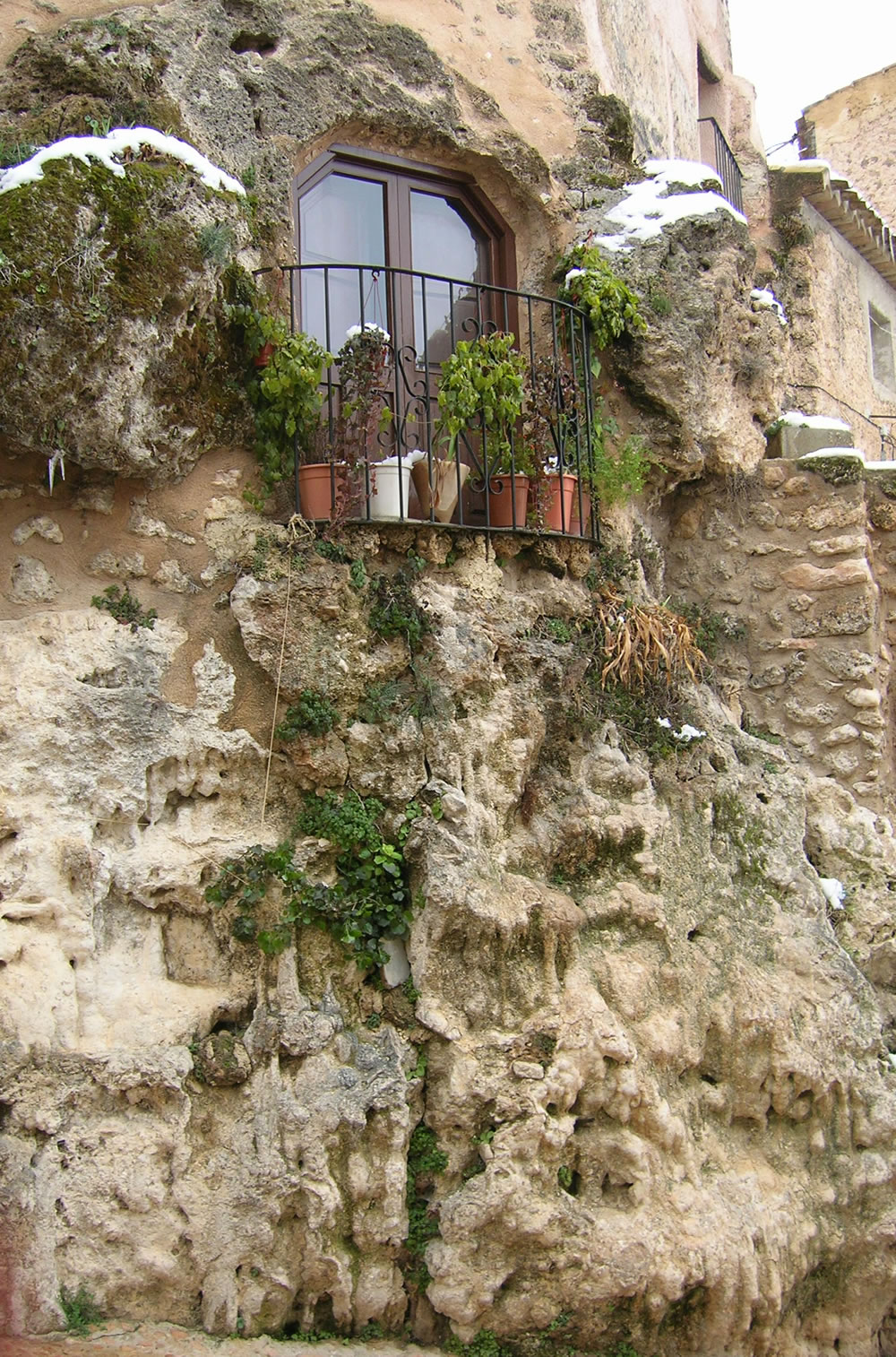
Casa en la roca
