= Abejuela (Albacete) =

Coordinates: 38.365723°N 2.039872°W

Abejuela is a village in Albacete, Castile-La Mancha, Spain. Found in the municipality of Letur, it is located to the west of the municipality, near the city limits of Férez; it is crossed by the Abejuela stream. It has a population of 58 inhabitants.

== History ==
Abejuela was founded as a transit town some time ago for shepherds who used the village as an opportunity to rest in the mountains on their way to the farms, tinades and corrals that were in the surrounding areas.

== Access ==
Abejuela is accessible by a local (A-36) track that leaves the Elche de la Sierra (CM-3217) highway, at the height of the hamlet of Las Cañadas.

== Facilities ==
The town had a school which is now closed due to a lack of young people, and which was later refurbished. It also has a health center. Among the historical monuments are a laundry room in disrepair and the St. Bartholomew chapel, much better conserved. This is a simple chapel with nave ceiling, wooden beam gables and a small entrance staircase.
