= Israel Fernández =

Spanish singer

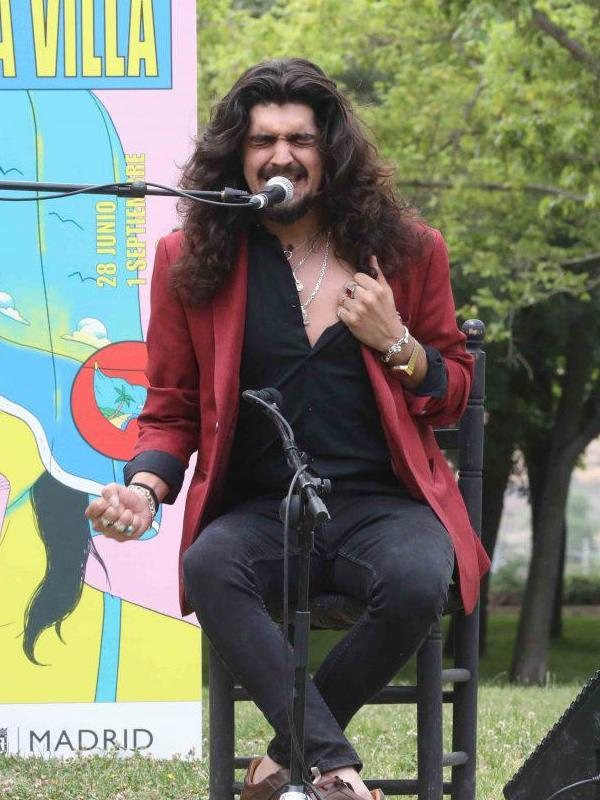

Background information
- Born: 1989 (age 36–37); Corral de Almaguer, Spain
- Genre: Flamenco
- Years active: 2008–present

Israel Fernández (born 1989) is a Spanish Romani flamenco singer.

== Biography ==
Fernández was born into a Romani family in Corral de Almaguer, Toledo. At an early age, his family instilled in him an interest in flamenco. He began to participate in musical television competitions and at the age of 18 he recorded his first album.

In November 2021, Fernández performed Fiesta (Bulería) on A COLORS SHOW. His album Amor was nominated for Best Flamenco Album at the 22nd Annual Latin Grammy Awards.

Fernández works jointly with guitarist Diego del Morao on most of his songs.

== Discography ==
=== Albums ===
- 2008: Naranjas Sobre la Nieve
- 2014: Con Hilo De Oro Fino
- 2018: Universo Pastora
- 2020: Amor
- 2023: Pura Sangre
