= La Plazuela =

Spanish musical duo

- Origin: Granada, Spain
- Genres: Funk, flamenco, electronic music
- Label: Universal Music Spain

La Plazuela is a musical duo from Granada, Spain. The duo is composed of Manuel Hidalgo Sierra, El Indio, and Luis Abril Martín, El Nitro. Formed in 2019, the duo's music is a fusion of flamenco, funk, pop, and electronic music.

== History ==
Manuel Hidalgo Sierra, El Indio, and Luis Abril Martín, El Nitro, meet during childhood when they were in the same class as three year olds. They became closer friends at 13 but it would be at 16 when they began to create covers of artists they admired, like Manzanita, Los Chichos, or Pata Negra.

La Plauzela arose when a group of friends, including El Indio and El Nitro, met up to play music together for fun. The group met in a spare room of El Nitro's apartment building to play music, and that space would become an improvised studio and a hang-out spot. The name of the group comes from this place, as El Indio referred to it once as La Plazuela Techá, meaning in English, the small roofed plaza. Later and with the release of their first EP, the duo decided to shorten the name to La Plazuela.

== Musical Influences ==
The music of La Plazuela is influenced by flamenco and funk. Regarding flamenco, they are influenced by genre's early period, such as the music of Camarón, Enrique Morente, Pata Negra and Ketama. In regards to more recent Flamenco artists, their music is influenced by musicians like David de Jacoba or Agujetas Chico. As for funk music, their main influences are Silk Sonic, Jungle, Aaron Taylor and Free Nationals. The duo has expressed the wish to collaborate with artists such as Dellafuente.

== Discography ==
=== Albums ===
- Roneo Funk Club (2023), Universal Music Spain, co-produced by Juanito Makandé.

=== EPs ===
- Yunque, Clavos y Alcayatas (2019)
- Jamila (2022) produced by Antonio Narváez, Chico Blanco y Loren de Califato ¾.

=== Singles ===
- Placeta de la Charca (2020)
- Principios del XX (2020)
- Tangos de Copera (2021)
- Campanas del olvido (2022)
- Mi tarara (2022)
- Perico el de La Tomasa (2022)
- Perico el de La Tomasa (por bulerías) (2022)
- Realejo Beach (2022)
- El lao de la pena (2023)
- Péiname, Juana (2023)
- La vuelta (2023)
- La primerica helá (2023)
