= Vetusta Morla =

Musical ensemble

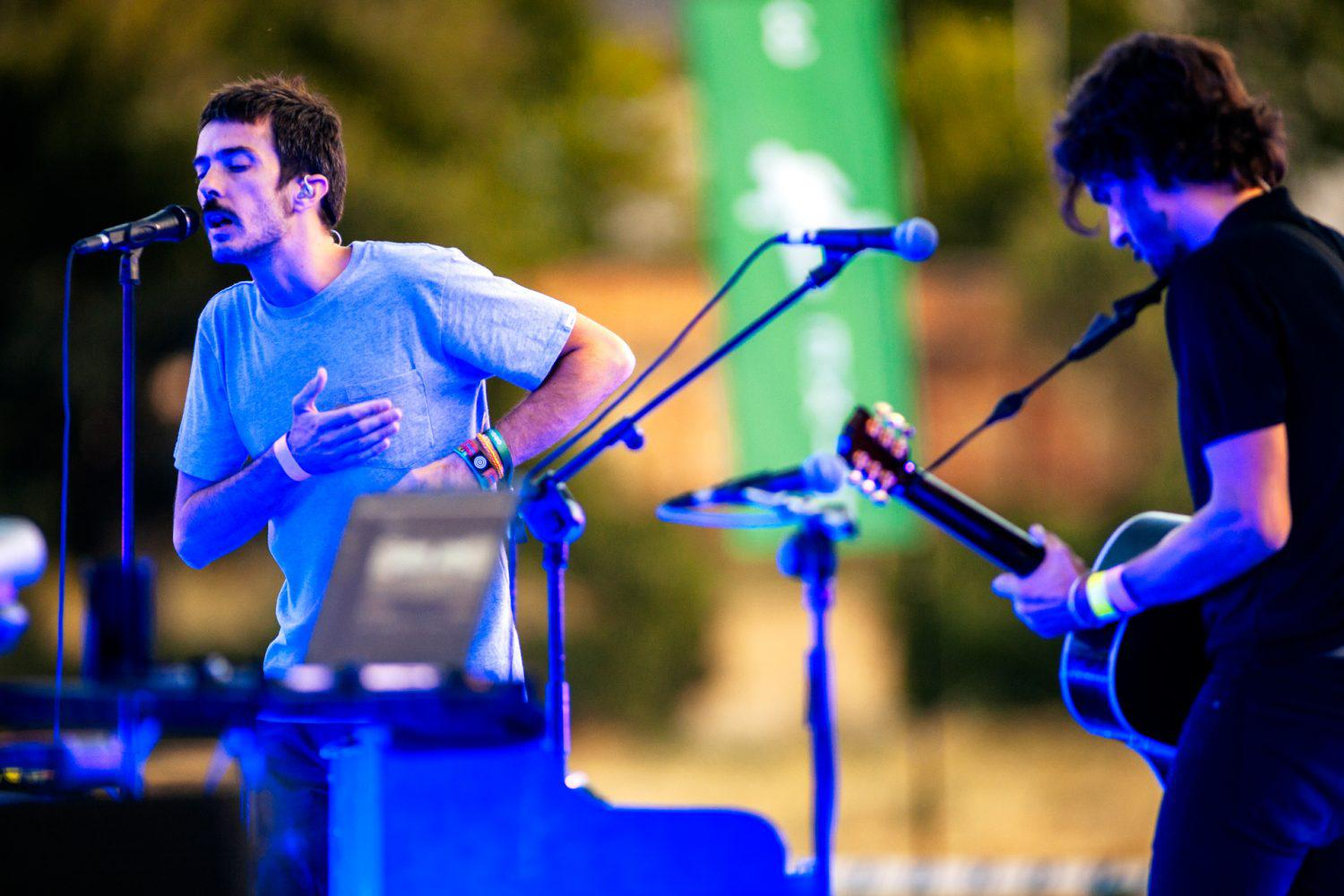

Background information
- Origin: Tres Cantos (Madrid)
- Genres: Indie rock; Alternative rock; Indie pop; Pop rock
- Years active: 1998–present
- Label: Pequeño Salto Mortal
- Members: Pucho; David "el Indio"; Álvaro B. Baglietto; Jorge González; Guillermo Galván; Juanma Latorre
- Website: www.vetustamorla.com

Vetusta Morla is a Spanish indie-rock band originally from the city of Tres Cantos located near Madrid, Spain. The band was formed in 1998 and took its name from the giant old tortoise Morla, a character in the children's book The Neverending Story by Michael Ende. "Vetusta" means "extremely old" or "decrepit" in Spanish.

== History ==
Vetusta Morla was formed in the summer of 1998 at the José Luis Sampedro Secondary School in Tres Cantos, Madrid, where a few students decided to perform at the institute's culture week and founded a rock band. The band was a hobby project for the participants; lead singer Pucho was engaged in graphic design, drummer David "el Indio" ("the Indian") Garcia worked as a teacher, guitarist Juan Manuel Latorre had a program on Radio 3, and keyboardist Jorge Gonzalez taught physics.

The first demo, "13 Horas Con Lucy" ("13 Hours With Lucy"), was released in 2000 and won a few local music awards. Winning the Concurso de Rock de La Elipa in 2001 brought them to the attention of a professional producer, David Hyam, who produced the band's first EP, La Cuadratura Del Circulo, which wasn't released until 2003. At the end of 2001, the new bass-player Alvaro Baglietto replaced Alejandro Notario and since then, the band's composition has not been changed.

For several years, Vetusta Morla tried unsuccessfully to find a label. Indie music labels were reportedly not attracted to the commercial sound of the band and large ones did not see prospects for their music. The situation changed in 2006, when their performances at RTVE's Radio 3 concerts and as representatives for Spain at the International Anti-Crisis Festival in Beirut, won them an international audience of rock fans. Following this, the musicians decided to start working on the project seriously and quit their day jobs to fully devote themselves to music. To solve the problem of lacking a label, they created their own, Pequeño Salto Mortal (Fatal Little Leap).

Due to the "hobby" aspects of the project, Vetusta Morla performed intensively at various festivals and on radio and received some awards but their first album wasn't released until February 2008, after the band had been in existence for almost a decade. This album, titled Un día en el mundo (A Day in the World), contained twelve songs, one of which, "La Marea" ("The Tide"), had first been released on the La cuadratura del círculo EP in 2003. By the end of the year, Un día en el mundo appeared on almost every music chart in Spain and was called the best Spanish debut rock album. That same year Vetusta Morla went on their first big tour.

Three years later, in the spring of 2011, the band released their second album, Mapas (Maps), which also became popular. It had a more complex and minor-key sound than Un día en el mundo. The next year, having increased tour experience and two full-length albums, the band undertook an experiment by recording with the Regional Symphony Orchestra of Murcia in order to raise money for the restoration of the Narciso Yepes Conservatory building in the city of Lorca, which had been damaged in an earthquake in May 2011. The concert was officially released almost a year later in the spring of 2012.

Later that same year, the band released an original soundtrack album for the video game Los Rios De Alice (Rivers of Alice) from Delirium Studios. The disc consists mainly of instrumental compositions with only one track, "Los Buenos" ("The Good Ones"), a song in their usual style.

At the end of 2013, the band announced the release of their third album, La Deriva (Drift). The first single "Golpe maestro" ("Masterstroke") was released in Spain on February 23, 2014, and the album itself on April 8, 2014. This was accompanied by numerous concerts and music videos. Their, Mismo sitio, distinto lugar (Same site, different place), was recorded at Hansa Studios in Berlin and released on November 10, 2017.

In 2017, the band took part in an audiovisual project from the Spanish national broadcaster Radio 3. Called Suena Guernica, (Singing Guernica), it commemorated the 80th anniversary of the painting of the same name by Pablo Picasso. As part of this project, famous Spanish musicians performed several songs in a front of the painting, which hangs in the Reina Sofia Museum in Madrid. Vetusta Morla performed three songs: "Alto!" and "Golpe Maestro" from their third album and "Puente de los franceses", a folk song from the Spanish Civil War.

In 2020, the band released an experimental album MSDL - Canciones dentro de canciones ("Songs in Songs"), which the musicians themselves describe as a nesting doll, where the songs from the fourth album were rethought in a different format. In 2021, they announced the upcoming release of a sixth studio album, Cable a Tierra (Cable to Earth).

== Awards and nominations ==
Award	Year	Category	Nominated work	Result	Ref.
Critical Eye Awards	2008	Modern Music	Vetusta Morla	Won	
Latin Grammy Awards	2018	Best Alternative Music Album	Mismo Sitio, Diferente Lugar	Nominated	
Latin Grammy Awards	2018	Best Alternative Song	"Consejo de Sabios"	Nominated	
Latin Grammy Awards	2020	Best Recording Package	MSDL - Canciones dentro de canciones	Nominated	
Latin Grammy Awards	2022	Best Pop/Rock Album	Cable a Tierra	Nominated	
Latin Grammy Awards	2022	Best Rock Song	"Finisterre"	Nominated	
Latin Grammy Awards	2022	Best Long Form Music Video	Matria	Nominated	
MTV Europe Music Awards	2011	Best Spanish Act	Vetusta Morla	Nominated	
Premios Odeón	2021	Best Alternative Artist	Vetusta Morla	Won	
Premios Odeón	2021	Best Alternative Album	MSDL - Canciones dentro de canciones	Nominated	
Premios Odeón	2022	Best Alternative Album	Cable a Tierra	Nominated	
Rolling Stone en Español Awards	2023	Album of the Year	Bailando Hasta el Apagón	Nominated	
UFI Awards	2009	Best Artist	Vetusta Morla	Won	
UFI Awards	2009	Best Album	Un Día en el Mundo	Won	
UFI Awards	2009	Best Rock Album	Un Día en el Mundo	Won	
UFI Awards	2009	Best Song	"Valiente"	Won	

Note: At the 19th Annual Latin Grammy Awards, Mismo Sitio, Diferente Lugar was also nominated for Best Recording Package, the nomination was received by Rubén Chumillas as the art director of the album.

=== Recognitions ===
- "Copenhague", the fourth track from Un día en el mundo, was chosen as one of the three best Spanish indie songs of the last 30 years in a vote carried out among Internet users and listeners of Radio 3 as part of a song contest called "Indispensable" launched by the Independent Phonographic Union and Radio 3 to celebrate July 4 as Independent Music Day. "Copenhague" came in third place after "Qué nos va a pasar" from La Buena Vida and "La revolución sexual" from La Casa Azul.
- Vetusta Morla's first album, Un día en el mundo, occupied the second position in the MTV network's classification, where the 2008 favorites were chosen.
- In 2011 the group was named Best Group of the Year by the Rolling Stone magazine, and their second LP Mapas was named Best Album of the Year.
- In 2012, after performing a total of 107 concerts, 6 of them with the Murcia Region Symphony Orchestra and 28 abroad, the band received the award for Best Tour of the Year from the Rolling Stone magazine.
- In 2019, Vetusta Morla was awarded the Gràffica Prize for the visual aspects of their presentation. "In their records, design, illustration, visual resources, the packaging itself, and typography are an indispensable part of understanding the concepts they relate musically. Also on stage and, specifically, in their scenography, everything is a visual spectacle that emphasizes the need to also graphically narrate their stories. For uniting music and image in a unique and original format to convey ideas beyond music."

== Band Members ==
- Juan "Pucho" Pedro Martín Almarza (vocals, percussion)
- David "el Indio" García (drums, vocals)
- Álvaro B. Baglietto (bass guitar)
- Jorge González (percussion and electronic music)
- Guillermo Galván (guitar, keyboards and vocals)
- Juan Manuel Latorre (guitar and keyboards)

== Discography ==
=== Studio albums ===
- Un día en el mundo (2008)
  No.	Title	Length
  1.	"Autocrítica"	4:42
  2.	"Sálvese Quien Pueda"	3:22
  3.	"Un Día en el Mundo"	4:12
  4.	"Copenhague"	5:03
  5.	"Valiente"	3:28
  6.	"La Marea"	3:43
  7.	"Pequeño Disastre Animal"	3:34
  8.	"La Cuadratura del Círculo"	4:35
  9.	"Año Nuevo"	4:26
  10.	"Rey Sol"	3:27
  11.	"Saharabbey Road"	4:37
  12.	"Al Respirar"	3:35
  13.	"Un Plan Mejor"	4:14
  Total length:		51:58
- Mapas (2011)

No.	Title	Length
1.	"Los Días Raros"	6:27
2.	"Lo Que Te Hace Grande"	4:12
3.	"En el Río"	3:07
4.	"Baldosas Amarillas"	4:16
5.	"Boca en la Tierra"	3:47
6.	"El Hombre del Saco"	3:05
7.	"Maldita Dulzura"	3:47
8.	"Cenas Ajenas"	4:02
9.	"Mapas"	3:51
10.	"Canción de Vuelta"	3:53
11.	"Escudo Humano"	4:35
12.	"Mi Suerte"	4:40
Total length:		49:42

- La Deriva (2014)

No.	Title	Length
1.	"La Deriva"	3:39
2.	"Golpe Maestro"	3:48
3.	"La Mosca en Tu Pared"	3:44
4.	"Fuego"	4:05
5.	"Fiesta Mayor"	3:36
6.	"¡Alto!"	3:13
7.	"La Grieta"	3:46
8.	"Pirómanos"	3:39
9.	"Las Salas de Espera"	3:40
10.	"Cuarteles de Invierno"	3:55
11.	"Tour de Francia"	4:15
12.	"Una Sonata Fantasma"	3:50
Total length:		45:10

- Mismo sitio, distinto lugar (2017)

No.	Title	Length
1.	"Deséame Suerte"	03:49
2.	"El Discurso del Rey"	03:41
3.	"Palmeras en La Mancha"	03:37
4.	"Consejo de Sabios"	05:18
5.	"23 de Junio"	03:27
6.	"Guerra Civil"	03:34
7.	"Te lo Digo a Ti"	02:27
8.	"Punto Sin Retorno"	04:40
9.	"La Vieja Escuela"	04:13
10.	"Mismo Sitio, Distinto Lugar"	03:42
Total length:		38:28

- MSDL — Canciones dentro de canciones (2020)

No.	Title	Length
1.	"Deséame Suerte – MSDL"	04:03
2.	"El Discurso del Rey – MSDL"	03:44
3.	"Palmeras en La Mancha – MSDL"	03:50
4.	"Consejo de Sabios – MSDL"	04:35
5.	"23 de Junio – MSDL"	03:02
6.	"Guerra Civil – MSDL"	03:42
7.	"Te lo Digo a Ti – MSDL"	02:50
8.	"Punto sin Retorno – MSDL"	03:46
9.	"La Vieja Escuela – MSDL"	04:13
10.	"Mismo Sitio, Distinto Lugar – MSDL"	03:28

- Cable a Tierra (2021)

No.	Title	Length
1.	"Puñalada Trapera"	03:34
2.	"La Virgen de La Humanidad"	03:05
3.	"No Seré Yo"	04:31
4.	"El Imperio del Sol"	02:58
5.	"Corazón de Lava"	04:17
6.	"La Diana"	02:46
7.	"Palabra Es lo Único que Tengo"	03:15
8.	"Si Te Quiebras"	03:39
9.	"Finisterre"	03:16
10.	"Al Final de la Escapada"	03:54
Total length:		35:15

- FIGURANTES (2024)

No.	Title	Length
1.	"Puentes"	03:20
2.	"¡Ay, Madrid!"	03:55
3.	"La Sábana de mis Fanstasmas"	03:26
4.	"Figurantes"	03:19
5.	"Catedrales"	03:42
6.	"Parece Mentira"	03:41
7.	"1, 2, 3, Big Bang"	02:47
8.	"Cosas que Hacer un Domingo por la Tarde"	03:31
9.	"La Derrota"	04:50
10.	"Nadadores"	03:34
11.	"Drones"	03:42

=== EPs ===
- 13 horas con Lucy (demo, 2000)
- Vetusta Morla (demo, 2001)
- La cuadratura del círculo (demo, 2003)
- Mira (EP, 2005)
