= Arde Bogotá =

Musical ensemble

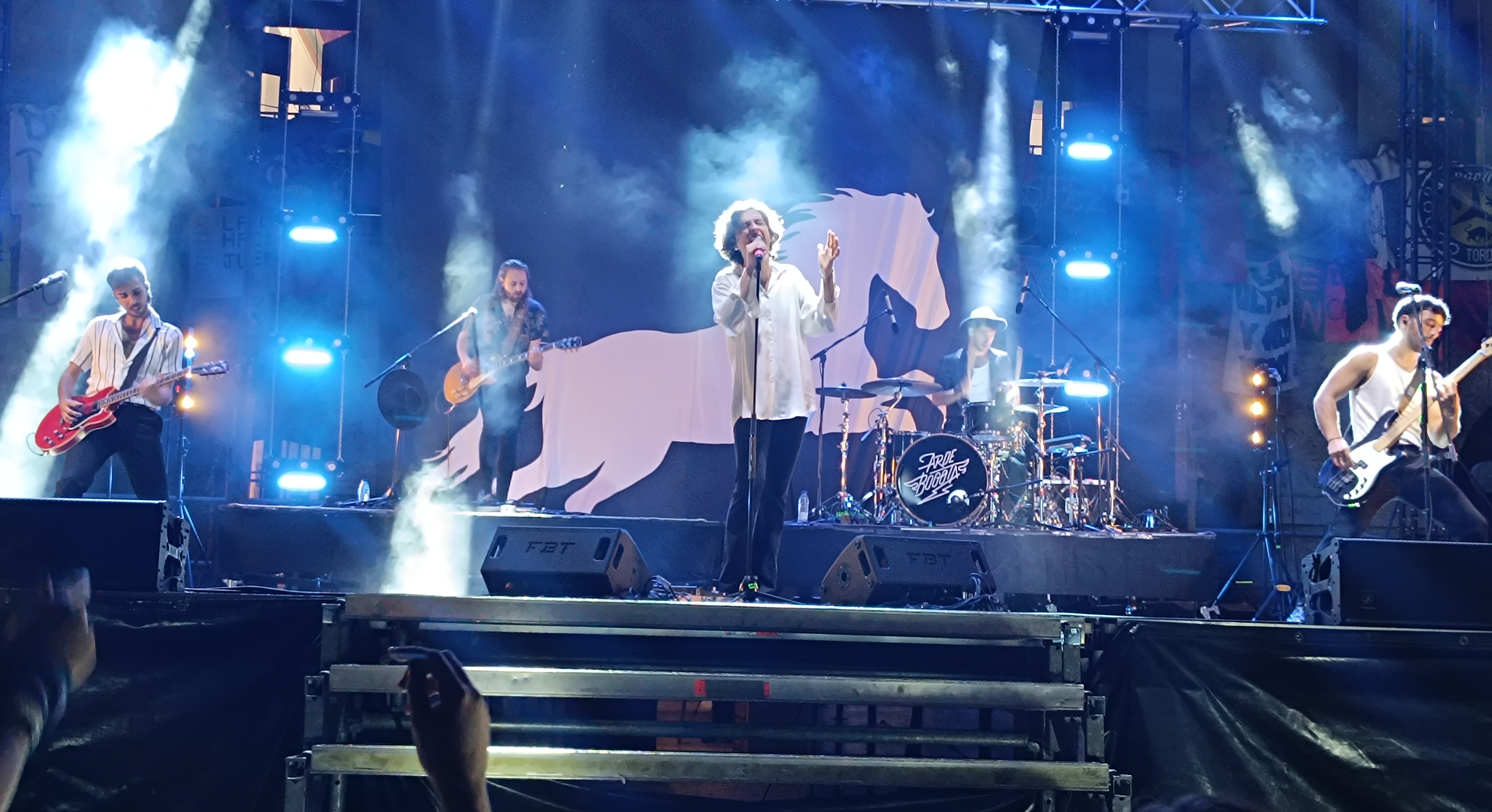

Background information
- Origin: Cartagena (Murcia)
- Genres: Alternative rock; Indie rock
- Years active: 2017–present
- Label: Sony Music
- Members: Antonio García; Dani Sánchez; Pepe Esteban; José Ángel Mercader
- Website: www.ardebogota.com

Arde Bogotá (English: Bogotá burns) is a Spanish alternative rock band originally from the city of Cartagena located in the Region of Murcia. The band was formed in 2017 and took its name from the Colombian city of Bogotá, where its first recordings were heard. The group is made up of Antonio García, Dani Sánchez, Pepe Esteban and José Ángel Mercader.

Their second studio album, Cowboys de la A3, entered directly at No. 3 on the sales charts in Spain and was nominated for the "Best Rock Album" at the Latin Grammy Awards. Among their influences, bands such as Arctic Monkeys, Foo Fighters or Héroes del Silencio usually stand out.

== Discography ==
=== Studio albums ===
Year	Title	Position in lists	Details
Year	Title	(Spain) ESP	Details
2021	La noche	22	Release date: 7 May 2021; Label: Sony Music Entertainment España
2023	Cowboys de la A3	3	Release date: 12 May 2023; Label: Sony Music Entertainment España
2026	Manufacturas del Club de la Gente Sola	1	Release date: 2 October 2026; Label: Sony Music Entertainment España

=== EPs ===
Year	Title	Details
2020	El tiempo y la actitud	Release date: 12 June 2020; Label: Sony Music Entertainment España
