= IFEMA Palacio Municipal =

Convention center in Madrid, Spain

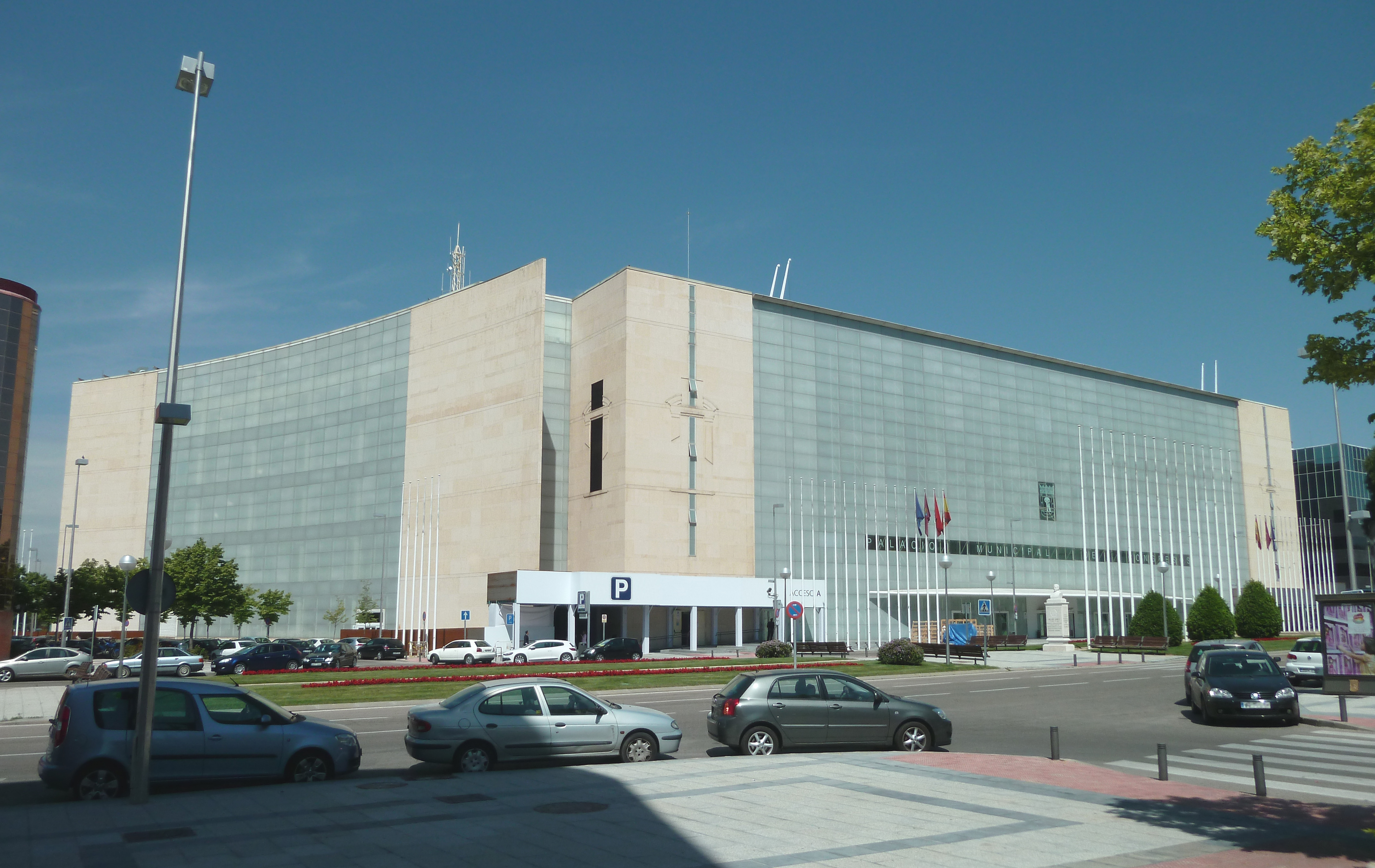
- Interactive map of the IFEMA Palacio Municipal area
- Former names: Palacio Municipal de Congresos

General information
- Type: Convention centre
- Location: Avenida Capital de España Madrid, 7, 28042, Madrid, Spain
- Current tenants: IFEMA
- Construction started: March 1991
- Completed: May 1993
- Opened: 19 October 1993

Design and construction
- Architect: Ricardo Bofill

The IFEMA Palacio Municipal, formerly known as Palacio Municipal de Congresos, is a convention centre in Madrid, Spain. Designed by Bofill Taller de Arquitectura, it is located near the IFEMA's main fairground complex in the Campo de las Naciones area. It is operated by IFEMA since 2019.

== History ==
It is located in the Corralejos neighborhood, Barajas district. Designed by Ricardo Bofill, building works lasted from March 1991 to May 1993. The building was inaugurated on 19 October 1993. Since 1995, when the Goya Awards moved from the similarly named Palacio de Congresos in the Paseo de la Castellana, the venue has hosted several editions of the awards' ceremonies. On 15 December 1995, the venue hosted the EU summit that ratified the creation of the "euro" currency. It has also hosted other international events such as IMF and World Bank meetings as well as NATO and UN summits. The facility closed down on 8 November 2012 to undergo building works to improve on its security. It re-opened on 24 April 2013. In 2018, the Ayuntamiento de Madrid and IFEMA agreed on the lease of the building to the latter party to for a period of 25 years, to be effective from 1 January 2019 onward.
