= Tanxugueiras =

Galician folk band

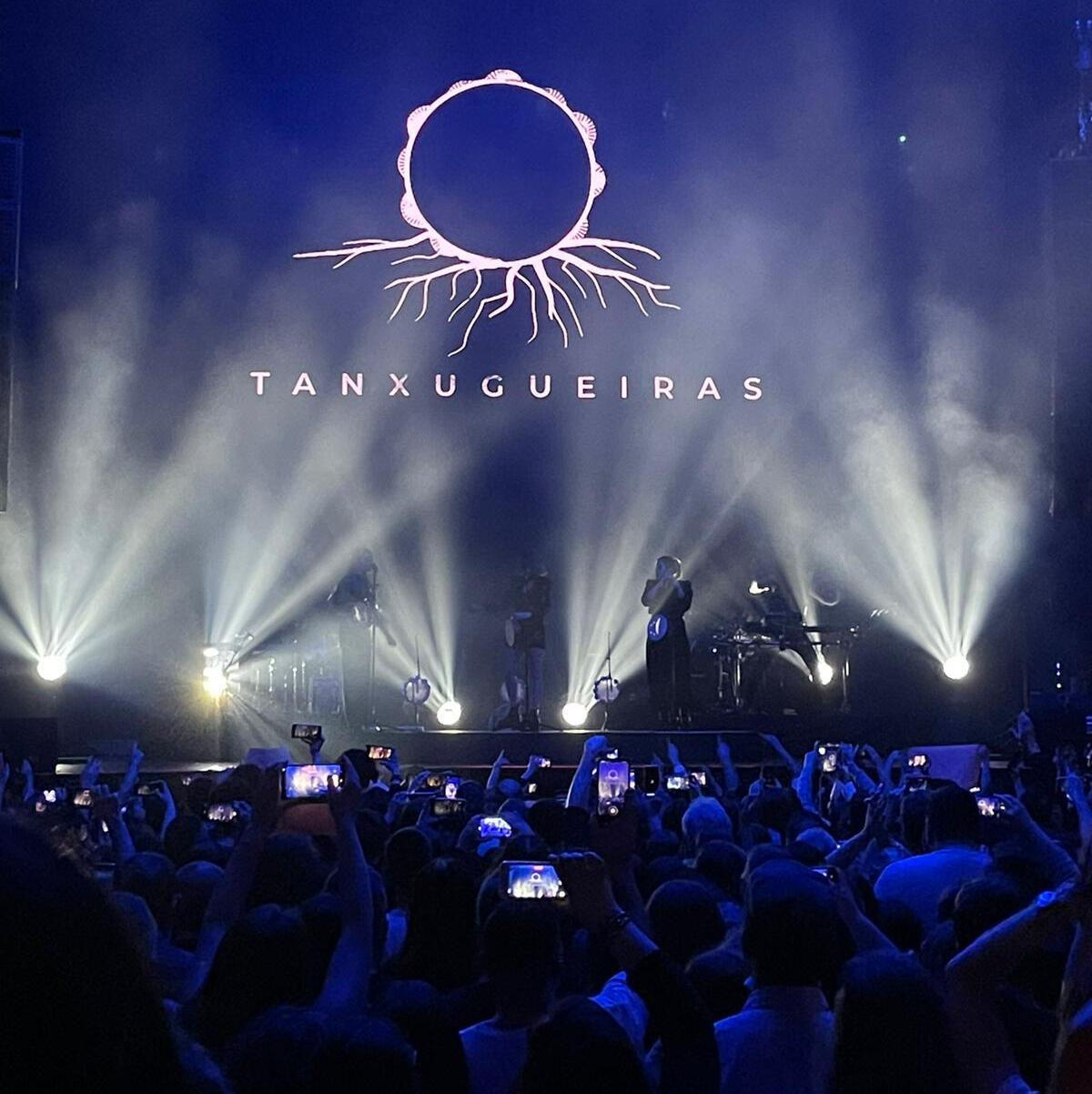

Background information
- Origin: Galicia, Spain
- Genres: Folk music; folktronica; Galician traditional music
- Years active: 2016–present
- Members: Aida Tarrío; Olaia Maneiro; Sabela Maneiro
- Website: tanxugueiras.com

Tanxugueiras (Galician pronunciation: [tanʃuˈɣejɾɐs̺]) is a Galician folk trio formed in 2016 by Aida Tarrío and twin sisters Olaia and Sabela Maneiro. The group aims to bring a modern sound to traditional Galician music by merging folk sounds with pop and world music influences. Their music focuses on themes such as the understanding between peoples, the defense of the Galician language and culture, and women's empowerment.

== History ==
=== Beginnings ===
Tanxugueiras made a name for themselves in Spain even before the release of their first album. In early 2017, a video of the trio singing with A Banda das Crechas in Glasgow became popular on social media. Later in 2017, they collaborated with fellow Galician band A banda da Loba on the song "Pepa".

=== 2018: Tanxugueiras ===
In 2018, they released their first album, the self-titled Tanxugueiras. For this they won the 2018 MIN Award for the best album in Galician.

=== 2019: Contrapunto ===
In 2019, the band received the Martín Códax da Música Prize in the category of Traditional Galician and Folk Music. Later in the same year, their second album Contrapunto was released. It was produced by Tanxugueiras with the collaboration of Isaac Palacín. Along with pieces closer to traditional music, such as "Perfidia" and "Miña Nai", other tracks such as "Malquerenza" and "Desposorio" have sounds reminiscent of pop or electronic music.

=== 2020–2021: Recognition and new singles ===
In 2020, Tanxugueiras received the award for Best Adaptation of a Traditional Piece at La Opinión de Música de Raíz Awards.

One of their singles released in 2021, "Figa", was chosen in a vote among fans of the Eurovision Song Contest as the favourite song to participate in the 2022 edition. Subsequently, they entered Benidorm Fest with the song "Terra", which is based on the traditional rhythm of Muiñeira, with the aim of representing Spain at Eurovision. The song was published to significant positive reception, garnering over half a million plays on platforms such as YouTube, Spotify, and Apple Music on the first day of release.

=== 2022: "Terra" and Benidorm Fest ===
Tanxugeiras progressed to the final of Benidorm Fest 2022, winning both the televote and demoscopic vote, coming in second place overall in the semi-final behind Chanel Terrero's song "SloMo". In the final, they came in third place behind Chanel and Rigoberta Bandini. In addition, they collaborated with Rayden on the song "Averno", which will feature on their upcoming album.

Following the competition, Tanxugueiras entered the Spanish charts for the first time. "Terra" peaked at number seven on the Spanish Singles Chart and "Averno" entered at number eighty-one. In addition, their 2019 album Contrapunto entered the Spanish Albums Chart at number fifty-two.

On 29 July 2022, Tanxugueiras released their third studio album titled Diluvio, which includes the singles "Midas", "Figa", "Terra", "Averno" and "Pano Corado". The album debuted at number four on the Spanish Albums Chart, marking their second entry on the chart and first top 10.

== Discography ==
=== Studio albums ===
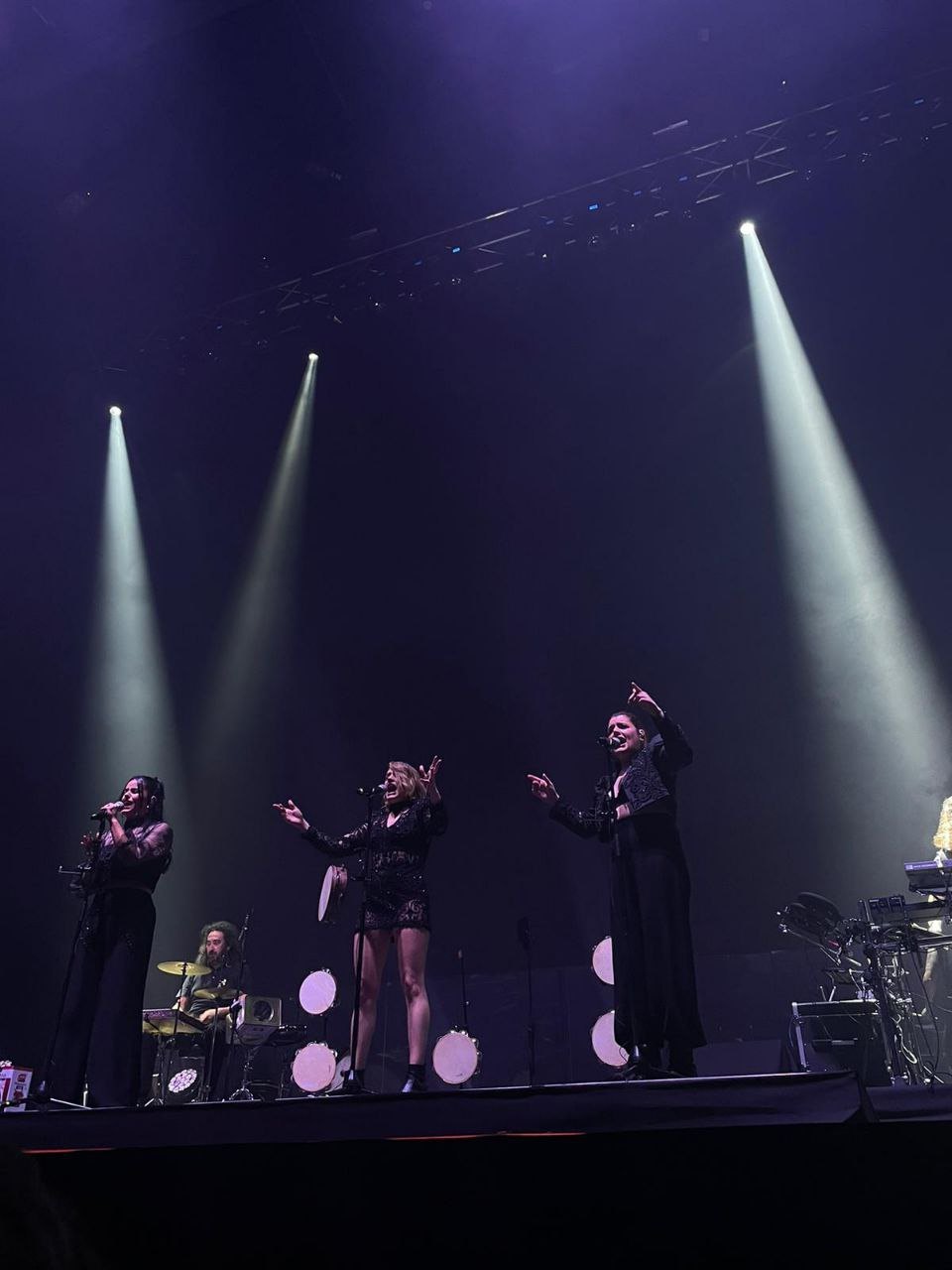

Title	Details	Peak chart positions
Title	Details	SPA
Tanxugueiras	Released: 2018; Format: CD, Digital, streaming; Label: Independent	—
Contrapunto	Released: 2019; Format: CD, Digital, streaming; Label: Calaverita Records SL and Play Plan Cultural	52
Diluvio	Released: 29 July 2022; Format: CD, Digital, streaming; Label: Calaverita Records SL	4

=== Singles ===
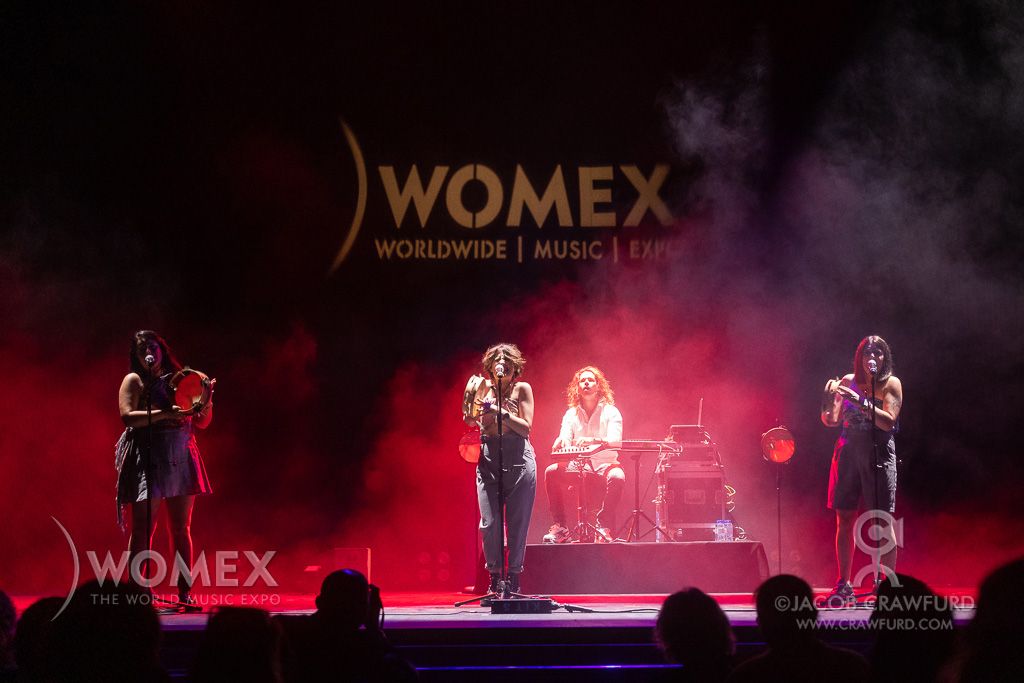

Title	Year	Peak chart positions	Album
Title	Year	SPA	Album
"Que non mo neguen"	2018	—	Tanxugueiras
"Perfidia"	2019	—	Contrapunto
"Desposorio"	2019	—	Contrapunto
"Malqueranza"	2020	—	Contrapunto
"Midas"	2021	—	Diluvio
"Telo"	2021	—	Non-album singles
"Coda" (with Chalart58)	2021	—	Non-album singles
"Figa"	2021	—	Diluvio
"Terra"	2021	7	Diluvio
"Averno" (with Rayden)	2022	81	Diluvio
"Pano Corado"	2022	—	Diluvio
"—" denotes single that did not chart or was not released.

== Awards and nominations ==
Year	Organization	Category	Nominee/work	Result	Ref.
2019	Premios MIN	Best Album in Galician Language	Tanxugueiras	Won	
2022	Premios MIN	Best Breakthrough Artist	Tanxugueiras	Won	
2022	Premios MIN	Song of the Year	"Terra"	Nominated	
2022	Premios MIN	Best Video	"Figa"	Nominated	

- XIX Premios La Opinión de Música de Raíz 2020 (Mejor adaptación de una pieza tradicional)
- World Music Charts Europe 2020 (20 mejores discos de World Music en mayo de 2020)
- Certame aRi(t)mar Galiza e Portugal 2019 (Mejores Músicas de Galiza 2019)
- Premios Mestre Mateo do Audiovisual Galego 2019 (Finalistas Mejor videoclip por Perfidia)
- Scots Trad Music Awards 2019 (Finalistas en la categoría de Mejor vídeo con Shooglenifty)
- Premios MIN de la Música Independiente 2019 (Finalistas Mejor álbum gallego)
- Premios Martín Códax da Música 2019 (Mejor grupo de Música tradicional y folk)
- Premios MIN de la Música Independiente 2018 (Mejor álbum gallego)
