= Premio Ruido =

- Awarded for: Best album from Spain
- Location: Spain
- First award: 2015
- Website: premioruido.es

Premio Ruido (Spanish for "Noise Prize") was set up in October 2015 as a yearly single-category award for the best music album produced in Spain. The first ceremony to present the award took place in January 2016, after the nominees had been announced in November of the previous year.

In terms of the process followed and rules, Premio Ruido bears a close similarity to the Mercury Prize in the UK, and the intention is to recognise artistic quality over sales success, in contrast to previously existing awards. However, whilst the Mercury Prize is awarded by a mixed panel that includes both musicians and figures of the music industry, as well as members of the media and journalists, and was established by the British Phonographic Industry, Premio Ruido was established by Periodistas Asociados de Música (the Spanish Association of Music Journalists) and it is their members who take part in the selection. The company Virtual Contenidos SL manages and produces the annual awards, while PAM's Board of Directors conducts and ratifies the voting process.

At the initial stage, PAM members vote for their favourite national records launched that year. This is so as to draw a stylistically diverse shortlist of twelve nominated albums. A recording is deemed "national" if at least half of the artists taking part are Spanish nationals or else have permanent residency in Spain. At the final stage, the associates vote for just one of the nominees. The winning artist is presented with a trophy.

El Niño de Elche was the inaugural winner with the album "Voces del extremo".

== Winners and shortlisted nominees ==
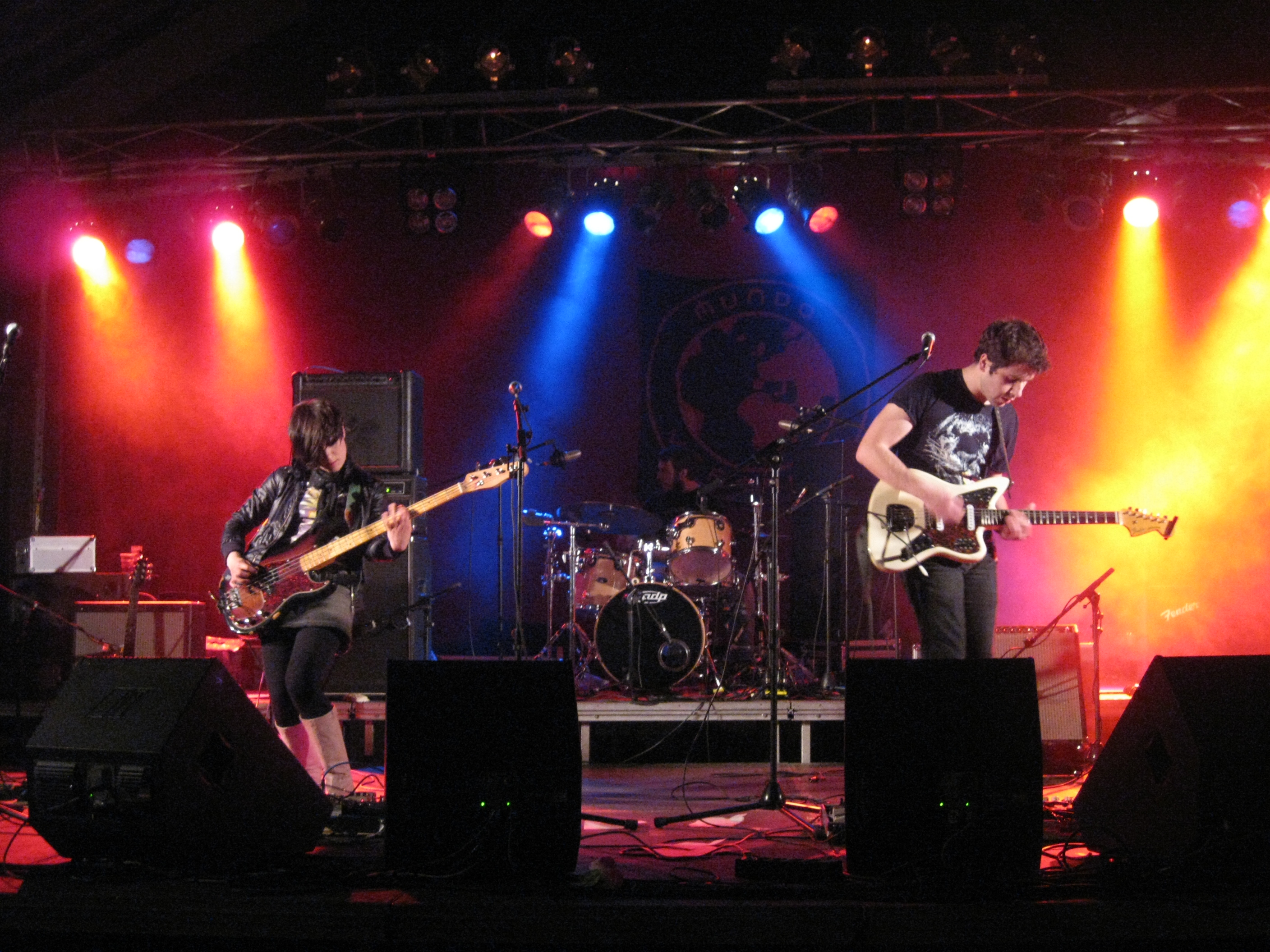
Winners of the 2016 edition Triángulo de Amor Bizarro

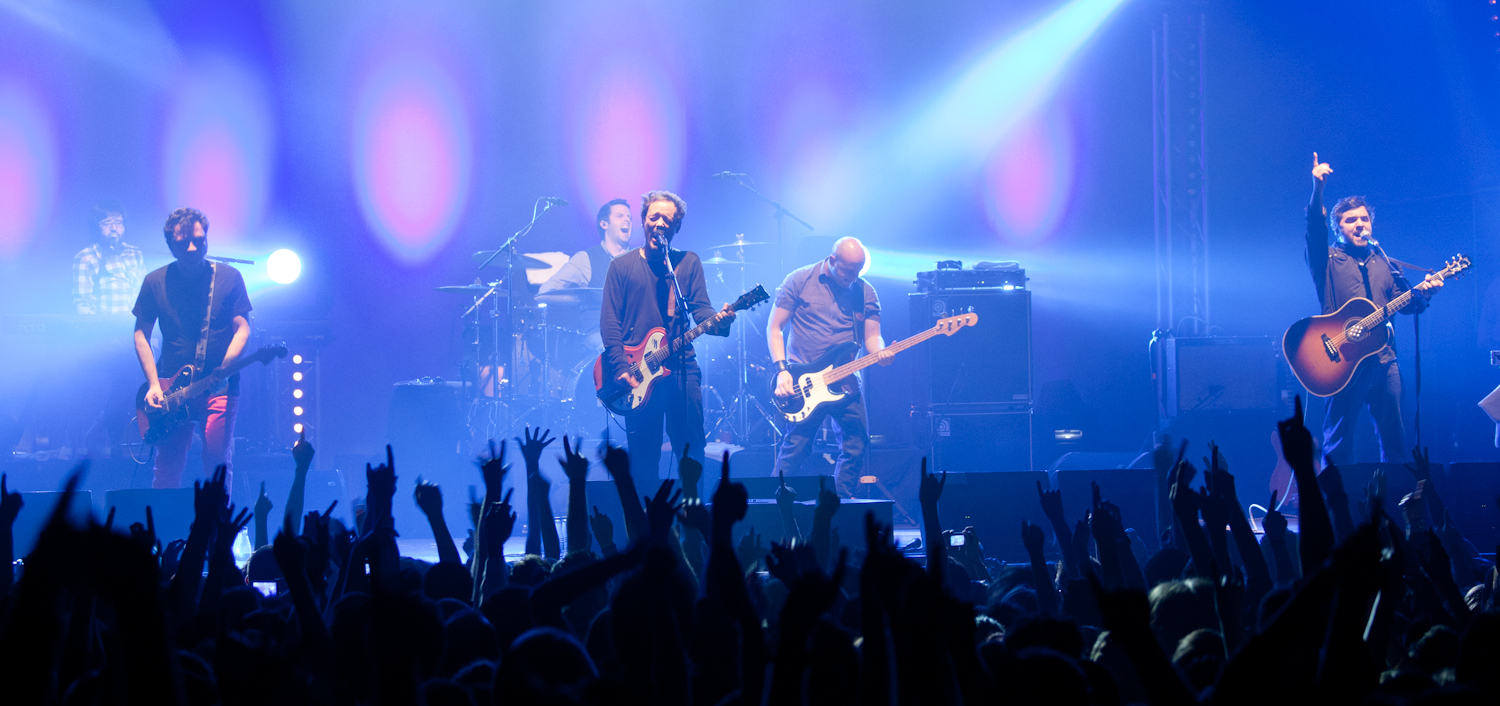
Love of Lesbian

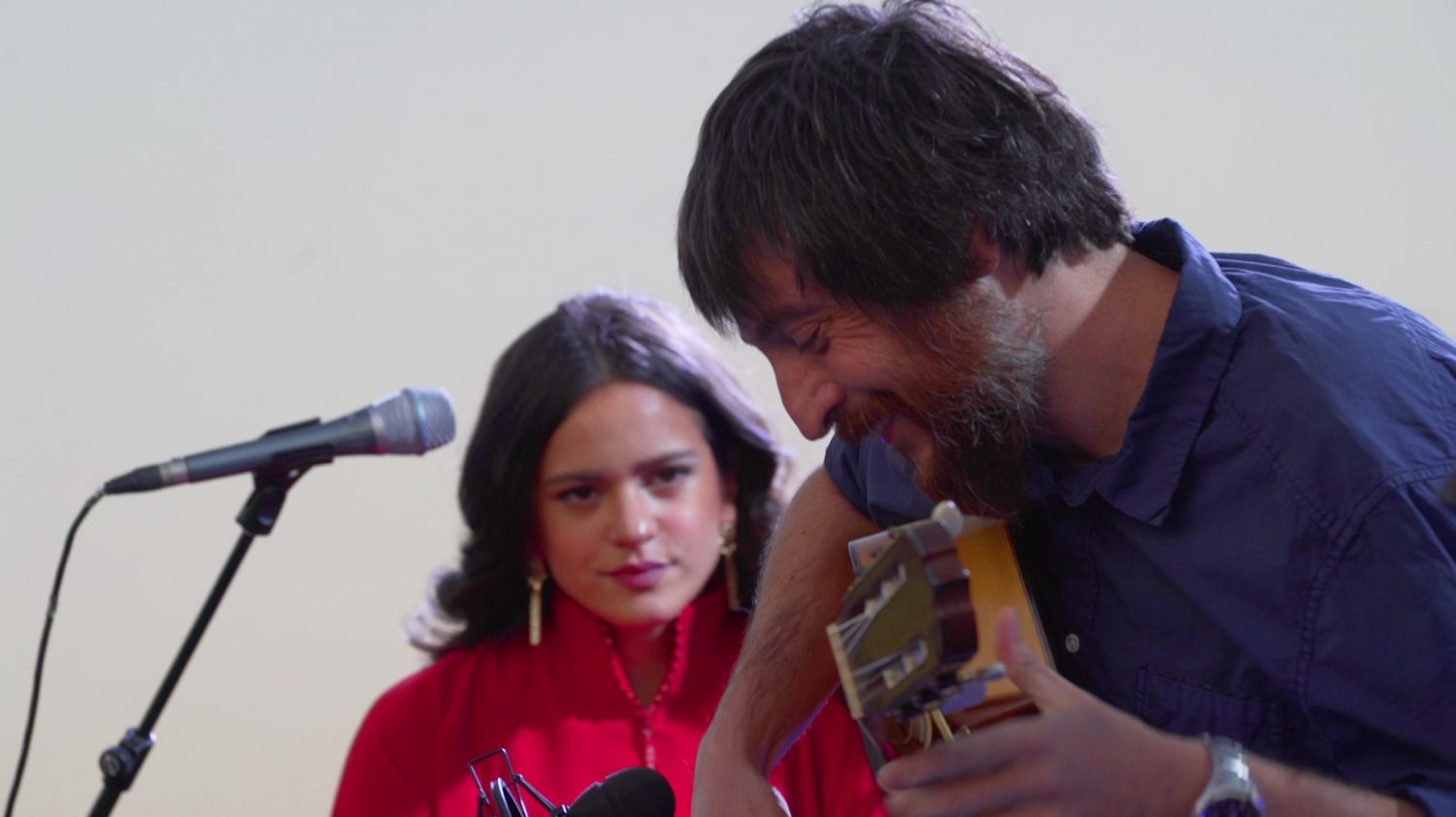
Rosalía and Raül Refree

Year	Winner	Shortlisted nominees
2015	Niño de Elche – Voces del Extremo	Disco Las Palmeras! – Asfixia; Francisco Nixon – Lo Malo Que Nos Pasa; Guadalupe Plata – Guadalupe Plata; L.A. – From The City To The Ocean Side; La Bien Querida – Premeditación, Nocturnidad y Alevosía; Nueva Vulcano – Novelería; Pablo Und Destruktion – Vigorexia Emocional; Soleá Morente –Tendrá Que Haber Un Camino; Toundra – IV; Tulsa – La Calma Chicha; Xoel López – Paramales
2016	Triángulo de Amor Bizarro – Salve Discordia	Aries – Adieu or die; Belako – Hamen; Depedro – El Pasajero; Espanto – Fruta Y Verdura; Hinds – Leave Me Alone; Iván Ferreiro – Casa; Juventud Juché – Movimientos; Kokoshca – Algo Real; León Benavente – 2; Love of Lesbian – El Poeta Haley; Manel – Jo Competeixo; Novedades Carminha – Campeones del Mundo; Quique González – Me Matas Si Me Necesitas; Silvia Pérez Cruz – Domus
2017	Rosalía – Los Ángeles (featuring Raül Refree)	Sentido del Espectáculo – Biznaga; Cala Vento – Fruto Panorama; C. Tangana – Ídolo; Exquirla – Para Quienes Aún Viven; Maria Arnal and Marcel Bagés – 45 Cerebros Y Un Corazón; Pablo Und Destruktion – Predación; Los Planetas – Zona Temporalmente Autónoma; Rocío Márquez – Firmamento; Rufus T. Firefly – Magnolia
2018	Rosalía – El Mal Querer	La Plata – Desorden; Morgan – Air; Nacho Vegas – Violética; Niño de Elche – Antología del Cante Flamenco Heterodoxo; PUTOCHINOMARICÓN – Corazón de Cerdo Con Ginseng Al Vapor; Rufus T. Firefly – Loto; Toundra – Vortex; Zahara – Astronauta
2019	Derby Motoreta's Burrito Kachimba - Derby Motoreta’s Burrito Kachimba	Cala Vento - Balanceo; Carolina Durante - Carolina Durante; Cupido - Préstame Un Sentimiento; Fuerza Nueva - Fuerza Nueva; La Bien Querida - Brujería; La Casa Azul - La Gran Esfera; León Benavente - Vamos a Volvernos Locos; Los Estanques - Los Estanques; Los Punsetes - Aniquilación; Novedades Caraminha - Ultraligero; Viva Suecia - El Milagro
2020	Triángulo de Amor Bizarro - Triángulo de Amor Bizarro	_Juno - _BCN626; Belako - Plastik Drama; Biznaga - Gran Pantalla; Confeti de Odio - Tragedia Española; Futuro Terror - Sangre; Ginebras - Ya Dormiré Cuando Me Muera; Hinds - The Prettiest Curse; Los Estanques - IV; María José Llergo - Sanación; Melenas - Días Raros; Mujeres - Siento Muerte; Soleá Morente - Lo Que Te Falta; Somos La Herencia - Dolo; The New Raemon - Coplas del Andar Torcido; Viva Belgrado - Bellavista
2021	María Arnal i Marcel Bagès - Clamor	Alizzz - Tiene Que Haber Algo Más; Baiuca - Embruxo; Califato 3/4 - La Contraçeña; C. Tangana - El Madrileño; Derby Motoreta's Burrito Kachimba - Hilo Negro; Kiko Veneno - Hambre; Kokoshca - Kokoshca; Maika Makovski - MKMK; Morgan - The River and the Stone; Quique González - Sur en el Valle; Rufus T. Firefly - El Largo Mañana; Soleá Morente - Aurora y Enrique; Vetusta Morla - Cable a Tierra; Zahara - Puta
2022	Rocío Márquez y BRONQUIO - Tercer Cielo	Biznaga - Bremen No Existe; Carolina Durante - Cuatro Chavales; Depresión Sonora - El Arte de Morir Muy Despacio; Guitarricadelafuente - La Cantera; Jorge Drexler - Tinta y Tiempo; Los Estanques y Anni B Sweet - Burbuja Cómoda y Elefante Inesperado; Los Punsetes - AFDTRQHOT; Maria Rodés - Fuimos los Dos; Menta - Un Momento Extraño; Nacho Vegas - Mundos Inmóviles Derrumbándose; Rigoberta Bandini - La Emperatriz; Rosalía - Motomami; Yawners - Duplo
2023	María José Llergo - Ultrabelleza	Adiós Amores - El Camino; Cala Vento - Casa Linda; Havalina - Maquinaria; La Paloma - Todavía No; La Plazuela - Roneo Funk Club; Mujeres - Desde Flores y Entrañas; Rodrigo Cuevas - Manual de Romerías; Sílvia Pérez Cruz - Toda la Vida, Un Día; Triángulo de Amor Bizarro – Sed; Tulsa - Amadora; Xoel Lopez - Caldo Espírito
2024	Alcalá Norte - Alcalá Norte	Ángeles Toledano - Sangre sucia; Bad Gyal - La Joya; Baiuca - Barullo; Bala - Besta; Biznaga - ¡Ahora!; Carolina Durante - Elige tu propia aventura; Hinds - Viva Hinds; Judeline - Bodhiria; Maestro Espada – Maestro Espada; Viuda - Provinciana; Viva Belgrado - Cancionero de los cielos
2025	Rufus T. Firefly - Todas las cosas buenas	Amaia - Si abro los ojos no es real; Carlos Ares - La boca del lobo; Frente abierto - Guerra a todo eso; Fuet! - Make It Happen; Guitarricadelafuente - Spanish Leather; Pumuky - No sueltes lo efímero; Repion - 201; Rosalía - Lux; Rusowsky – Daisy; Shego - No lo volveré a hacer; Valeria Castro - El cuerpo después de todo

== See also ==
- Mercury Prize (United Kingdom)
- Polaris Music Prize (Canadá)
- Shortlist Music Prize (United States)
- Choice Music Prize (Ireland)
- Irish Recorded Music Association
- Prix Constantin (France)
- Scottish Album of the Year Award (Scotland)
- Australian Music Prize (Australia)
- Nordic Music Prize (Scandinavian countries)
