= Triángulo de Amor Bizarro =

Galician post-punk/indie rock band

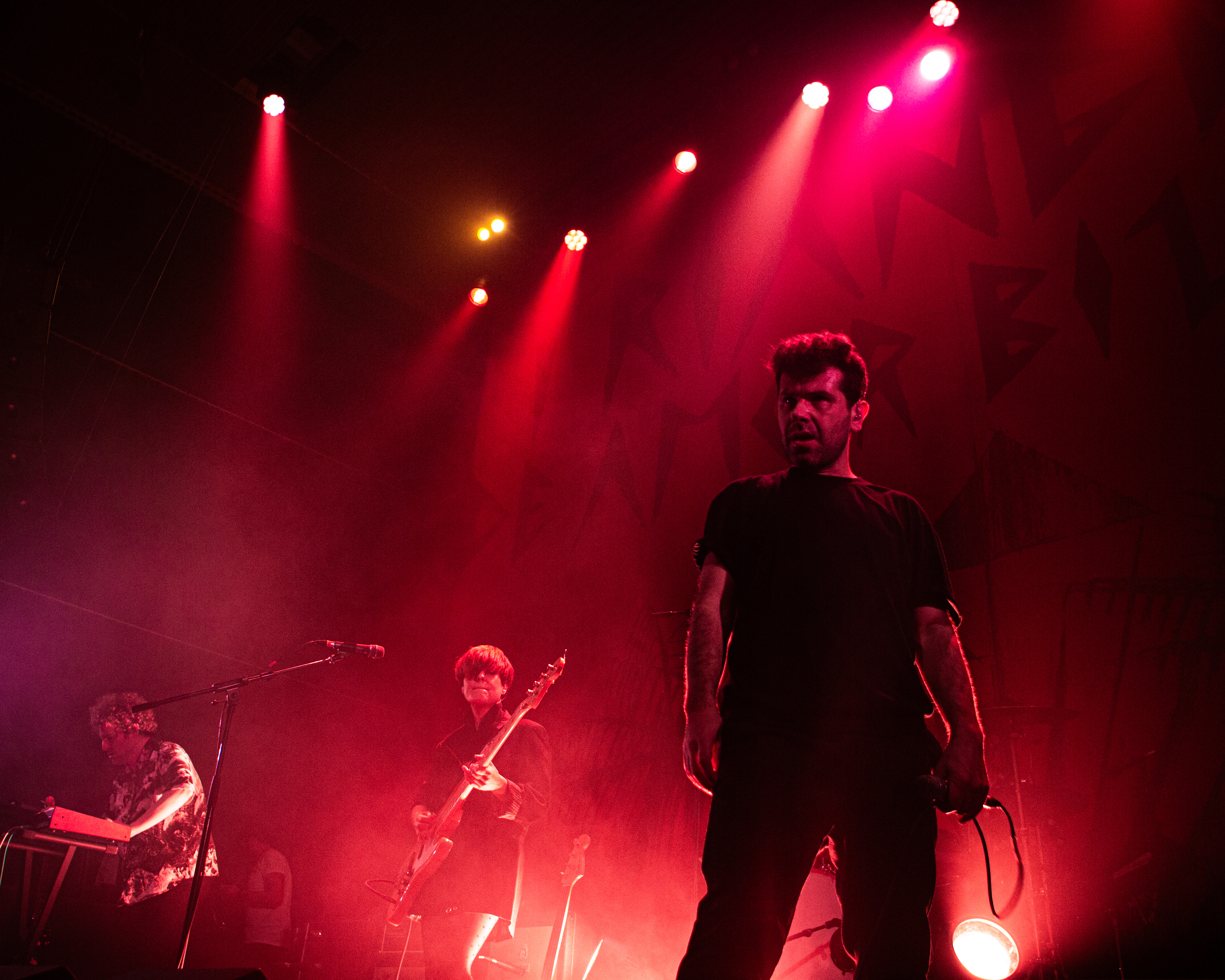
- Triángulo de Amor Bizarro in 2024

Background information
- Origin: Galicia, Spain
- Genres: Shoegaze; Post-punk; Neo-psychedelia; Noise rock; Indie rock; Space rock
- Years active: 2004–present
- Label: Mushroom Pillow
- Members: Isabel Cea; Rodrigo Caamaño; Rafael Mallo; Rubén "Zippo" Muñoz

Triángulo de Amor Bizarro is a Galician post-punk/indie rock band formed in 2004.

== History ==
The group was formed in A Coruña, although the members are from different parts of Barbanza, and A Coruña. They take their name from the song "Bizarre Love Triangle" by the British band New Order. Before recording their first album, Triángulo de Amor Bizarro recorded two self-produced demos that reached the semifinals of the demo competition DEMO Project of the Festival Internacional de Benicàssim two consecutive years in 2004 and 2005. In their beginnings the band was a quartet, evolving over time into a quintet before the recording of their first album, in which they were a trio until the entrance of Oscar Vilariño and Rafael Mallo, and with the departure of Julián Ulpiano (drums) in 2009.

Once signed to the label Mushroom Pillow, they recorded their debut self-titled album, Triángulo de Amor Bizarro in 2007, with technical Carlos Hernandez, known for the producing independent music albums independent of well-known bands like Los Planetas Sr. Chinarro and Mercromina. The album received very good reviews from the press, appearing among the top Spanish albums 2007 (ranked 2nd in the journal Mondosonoro and 9th in Rockdelux). In addition it was also picked among the best of the decade's most influential music media, as Rockdelux, Mondosonoro, Jenesaispop and others.

That same year they also released El Hombre del Siglo V, a compilation album of their two early demos which also includes three new songs.

At the end of 2009 they begin to record their second album entitled Año Santo, produced by Paco Loco, and released in May 2010. De la Monarquía a la Criptocracia was released as a single accompanied by a video directed by Luis Cervero. Año Santo received positive critical acclaim from both the press and public, and was celebrated as one of the best so far the year. They toured the album in Mexico and played the festivals of the peninsula, like el FIB, Paredes de Coura, and de México, where they participated in Corona Capital. The promotional tour was extended to 2011.

In 2011 Rubén Muñoz, also known as Zippo, joined the band and Oscar Vilariño left. They won the IMAS prize in Mexico for best Spanish band. Año Santo was nominated in 9 categories at the Independent Music Awards (UFI) and are awarded four of them, including Album of the Year.

In 2012 they recorded the digital single "Ellas Se Burlaron de Mi Magia" at the Red Bull Studios in Madrid, produced by Peter Kember (Sonic Boom) and mixed by Roberto Mallo. Later that year they began recording their third studio album, Victoria Mística. The album was released in July 2013, produced by the band itself, recorded in their own studio by Roberto Mallo, mixing by Manny Nieto (Breeders, Health, The Wolves) and mastering by Shane Smith.

In 2016 they released Salve Discordia, recorded by Carlos Hernández Nombela. The band embarked on a tour of a large number of halls and festivals in Spain, such as Bilbao BBK Live, Noroeste Pop Rock in A Coruña and Primavera Sound. They then toured across the United States and Mexico.

At the beginning of 2017 they received the Premio Ruido, awarded by the Association of Music Journalists of Spain for the best album of the year. They won the four major awards at the Independent Music Awards, receiving Best Artist, Album of the Year, Rock Album and Music Production.

In 2018 they released their latest work, an EP entitled El Gatopardo.

In 2020 their fifth full-length album, the self-titled Triángulo de Amor Bizarro (stylized as oɹɹɐzıqɹoɯɐǝpolnƃuɐıɹʇ), was released. The album became a critical success evidenced by their second Ruido Award in four years. The corresponding tour was extended in an unconventional way due to the restrictions related to COVID-19, performing throughout Spain both in theaters and places with limited capacity (due to the corresponding restrictions), up to large festivals.

In 2021 they released two new works. The first was No eres tú, defined as their pocket techno-opera or their particular Autobahn: an album with 17 tracks based on the song "No eres tú" from their 2020 album, but designed so that they can be listened to randomly and indefinitely, without cuts and so that the album lasts as long as the listener likes. Together with Toño Chouza, director of Boiro and also responsible for the video clip of the song "Fukushima", they created an audiovisual version called "NO ERES TÚ 666D" with a version of the album lasting 6:06:06: "every time you use it, thanks to our new shuffling technology, the song will be different." Manolo Martínez, a member of the band Astrud, collaborated on this album with the song "Donkey Kong in Minecraft".

That year they also published Detrás del Espejo, Variaciones y Ecos, a collaborative album based on oɹɹɐzıqɹoɯɐǝpolnƃuɐıɹʇ in which each song is covered by different artists: Erik Urano, Soleá Morente, Sr. Chinarro, Miguel Prado, Carolina Durante, Biznaga, Esplendor Geométrico, Sonic Boom, Boyanka Kostova, Aries, Menta, J de Los Planetas and Joaquín Pascual.

After a series of concerts in Mexico, they returned to Spain and began recording in their studio in Boiro what became their sixth album, Sed, recorded by Carlos Hernández, co-produced by him and the band and released in 2023. Defined by their record company as a complete and complex album, direct and anti-nostalgic. A month before the release of the album, they presented the video clip for the song "Estrella Solitaria" directed by Toño Chouza and recorded entirely in Boiro: "Without a doubt one of the richest and most symbolically charged videos of Triángulo de Amor Bizarro."

== Discography ==
- Triángulo de Amor Bizarro (2007)
- El Hombre del Siglo V (2007)
- Año Santo (2010)
- Victoria Mística (2013) No. 77 Spain
- Salve Discordia (2016) No. 35 Spain
- El Gatopardo (EP, 2018)
- Triángulo de Amor Bizarro (2020) No. 5 Spain
- Detrás del Espejo: Variaciones y Ecos (2021)
- Sed (2023) No. 62 Spain
- Mi catedral (2026)
