= Carolina Durante =

Spanish rock band

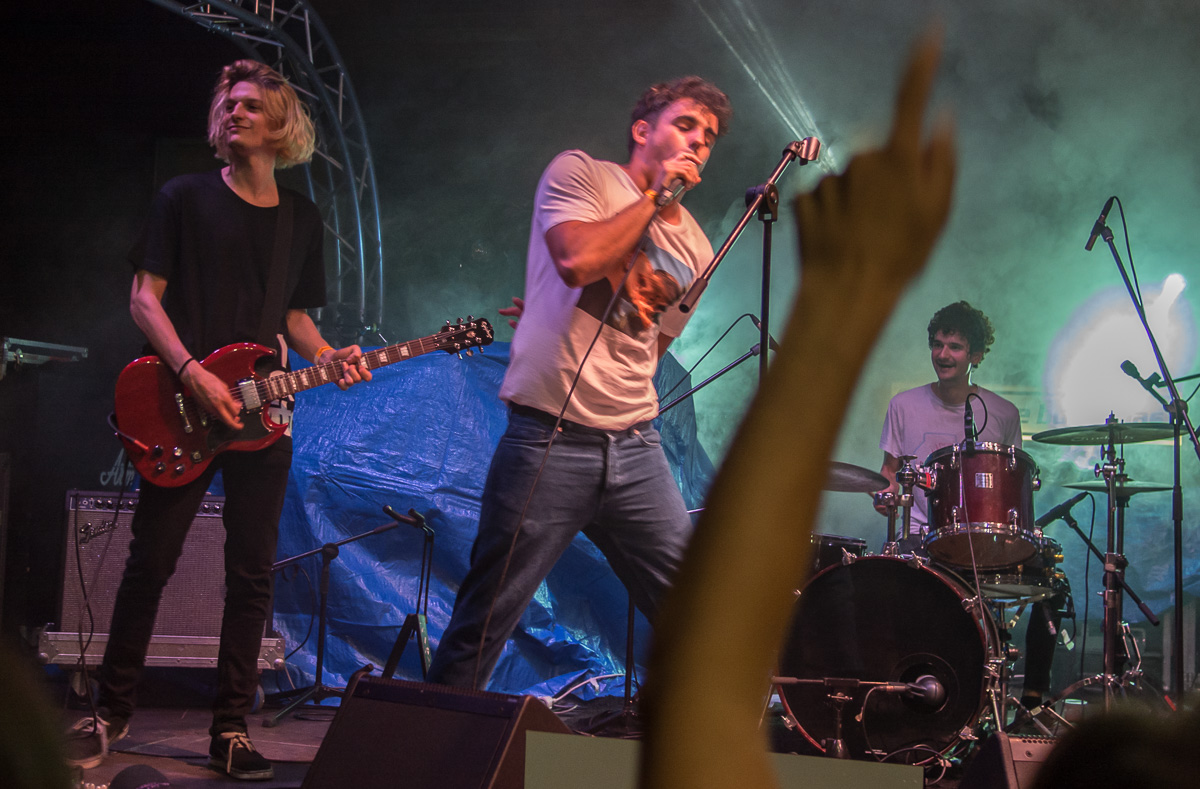
- Carolina Durante performing in Zaragoza in 2018

Background information
- Origin: Madrid, Spain
- Genres: Rock; pop rock; indie rock; pop-punk
- Years active: 2017–present
- Labels: Sonido Muchacho; Universal Music Spain
- Members: Diego Ibáñez; Martín Vallhonrat; Juan Pedrayes; Mario del Valle
- Website: carolinadurante.com carolinadurante.bandcamp.com

Carolina Durante is a Spanish indie rock band formed in 2017 in Madrid composed of Diego Ibáñez, Martín Vallhonrat, Juan Pedrayes and Mario del Valle. The group signed a joint record deal with Sonido Muchacho and released their debut extended play Necromántico in December 2017. Their debut studio album was released in April 2019 and debuted at the second spot of the PROMUSICAE chart. In 2019, Carolina Durante was the Spanish act that more concerts had offered in that year.

== Background ==
The band was formed in 2017 in Madrid, and was named after a summer romantic interest that Mario del Valle had as a teenager. Carolina Durante is a real woman who also studied alongside Ibáñez at the religious school Santa María de Yelmo in Chamberí and is now a journalist at the Agencia EFE.

== Career ==
Carolina Durante signed a joined contract in 2017 with Sonido Muchacho and released their first EP titled Necromático on December 23 which was well received by the critics. In March 2018 the band released their first hit single 'Cayetano' which caused major controversy due to its explicitly and naming of the main politic parties in Spain. The song earned the band a Premio MIN for 'Song of the Year' and another one for 'Best New Artist. In November 2018 the band released a more pop track titled 'Perdona (Ahora Sí Que Sí)" alongside Amaia, who won the ninth edition of the very well-known Spanish musical talent competition Operación Triunfo. This one is the one who opened them the doors to a major national popularity. However, "Perdona" is not an original song but a cover of Marcelo Criminal's. Thus, the band released their debut studio album, which they called Carolina Durante, on April 26, 2019 and premiered with four secret shows in Madrid, Valencia, Barcelona and Seville. The album debuted at the second position of the PROMUSICAE chart, lasted on it for 25 consecutive weeks and was named the best Spanish album of 2019 by specialized portals like El Cultural. In May they started a festival tour that visited many festivals like the Benicàssim International Festival, Dcode, Low Festival or Donostia Festibala. In November they started their first solo tour that visited Spain, London and Berlin. They performed at the 2019 United Nations Climate Change Conference in Madrid. In March 2020 the tour stopped due to the 2020 coronavirus pandemic.

== Discography ==
=== Studio albums ===
- Carolina Durante (2019)
- Cuatro Chavales (2022)
- Elige Tu Propia Aventura (2024)

=== EPs ===
- Necromático (2017)
- Examiga (2018)
- Del Horno a la Boca (2020)
- Al Cielo, Devil May Cry (2026)

=== Singles ===
- "La noche de los muertos vivientes" (2017)
- "En verano" (2017)
- "Necromántico" (2017)
- "Cayetano" (2018)
- "Niña de hielo" (2018)
- "300 golpes" (2018)
- "El himno titular" (2018)
- "Perdona (ahora sí que sí)" with Amaia (2018)
- "Joder, no sé" (2019)
- "Las canciones de Juanita" (2019)
- "El año" (2019)
- "No tan jóvenes" (2019)
- "El parque de las balas" (2020)
- "La canción que creo que no te mereces" with J of Los Planetas (2020)
- "Espacio vacío" – Él Mató a un Policía Motorizado with Carolina Durante (2020)
- "Famoso en tres calles" (2021)
- "Moreno de contrabando" (2021)
- "10" (2021)
- "La planta que muere en la esquina" (2021)
- "Granja escuela" (2022)
- "Salvaje pasión" (2022)
- "Casa Kira" with Orslok (2022)
- "Marta, Sebas, Guille y los demás" – Amaral's cover (2023)
- "Ya no hay verano" – Depresión Sonora's cover (2023)
- "Elige tu propia aventura" (2024)
- "Joderse la vida" (2024)
- "Yo pensaba que me había tocado Dios" – Barry B with Carolina Durante (2024)
- "Misil" (2024)
- "Hamburguesas" (2024)
- "De viaje" – Los Planetas' cover (2024)

=== Guest appearances ===
- "¿Qué?" – La Bien Querida with Diego Ibáñez of Carolina Durante (2019)
- "Vigilantes del espejo" – Triángulo de Amor Bizarro with Carolina Durante (2021)
- "Rock y amistad" – Mujeres with Carolina Durante (2021)
- "Joker (Reputa)" – Zahara with Carolina Durante (2022)
- "Plan de mierda" – La Élite with Diego Ibáñez of Carolina Durante (2024)
- "Untitled" – Los Punsetes with Carolina Durante (2024)

== Awards and nominations ==
Year	Awards	Category	Nominee/work	Result
2019	Premios MIN	Best New Artist	Carolina Durante	Won
2019	Premios MIN	Song of the Year	Cayetano	Won
2019	MTV Europe Music Awards	Best Spanish Act	Themselves	Nominated
2020	MTV Europe Music Awards	Best Spanish Act	Themselves	Nominated
2022	Berlin Music Video Awards	Best Performer	FAMOSO EN TRES CALLES	Nominated
