= Dan Peralbo and The Convoy =

Dan Peralbo i El Comboi
- Origin: Torelló, Catalonia
- Genres: Pop rock, rock
- Years active: 2020–present
- Labels: The Yellow Gate, The Magic Mountain, Montgrí
- Members: Dan Peralbo – vocals, guitar; Albert "Ret" Rams – guitar; Aleix "Jimmy" Vilarrasa – drums; Pol Villegas – bass
- Website: Official page at FIM

Dan Peralbo i El Comboi is a Catalan pop rock band from Torelló (Osona), Catalonia. They rose to prominence after winning the Sona9 contest in 2021.

Dan Peralbo is also the author of "Vermell i negre", the official anthem of the Club de Futbol Torelló.

== History ==
=== Beginnings ===
After spending some time in London playing in pubs and busking, Dan Peralbo moved to Barcelona and recorded his first EP as a singer-songwriter, Cosquis My (The Yellow Gate, 2020), at home. To perform the songs live, Pol Villegas, Aleix "Jimmy" Vilarrasa and Albert "Ret" Rams – former members of bands such as Flipats, Wood, Falciots Ninja and MiNE! – joined him. Under the name El Comboi, they became a solid band accompanying Dan and consolidating the project.

=== Breakthrough ===
In 2021 the band won the Sona9, which launched them into the Catalan music scene. With new EPs such as Immaculada concepció (2021) and Miris com t’ho miris (2022), the band consolidated itself within the emerging scene.

=== Signing with Montgrí and debut album ===
In 2024 the group signed with the Montgrí label and released their first album, Dan Peralbo i El Comboi. The record included eleven songs, two of which had appeared on previous works, and was produced by Aleix Turon and Joan Delgado of Cala Vento. A notable anecdote was that the drums had to be recorded with one hand due to the drummer's injury.

== Musical style and influences ==
The band describes its sound as a fusion between guitar-based rock and pop melodies, with a clear emphasis on the drums and lyrics that mix personal experiences with a playful tone. Critics have highlighted their energy and ability to connect with audiences.

== Band members ==
- Dan Peralbo: vocals, guitar
- Albert "Ret" Rams: guitar
- Aleix "Jimmy" Vilarrasa: drums
- Pol Villegas: bass

== Discography ==
=== EPs ===
- Cosquis My (The Yellow Gate, 2020)
- Immaculada concepció (The Yellow Gate, 2021)
- Miris com t'ho miris (The Magic Mountain / The Yellow Gate, 2022)
- Cosa fina (The Yellow Gate, 2023)

=== Albums ===
- Dan Peralbo i El Comboi (Montgrí, 2024)

=== Notable singles ===
- "Bang, Bang, Bang" (2024)
- "Tot allò que vaig sentir" (2024)
- "No em feu cas" (2023)

== Awards and recognition ==
- Winners of Sona9 2021

== Notable concerts and festivals ==
- Album presentation of Dan Peralbo i El Comboi at Sala Apolo in Barcelona (2025).
- Performances at Fira de Música Emergents i Familiar (Vila-seca), Fires de Sant Narcís (Girona), Festival MAIG 2025, and others.

== Critical reception ==
The band's debut album was well received, with critics praising its energy and blend of rock and pop. Outlets such as Enderrock, Núvol, Mondo Sonoro, and El Nacional published positive reviews and interviews.

== Collaborations ==
- Production of the debut album by members of Cala Vento.

== Other ==
- Author of the anthem "Vermell i negre" for Club de Futbol Torelló.
