= María José Llergo =

Spanish singer (born 1994)

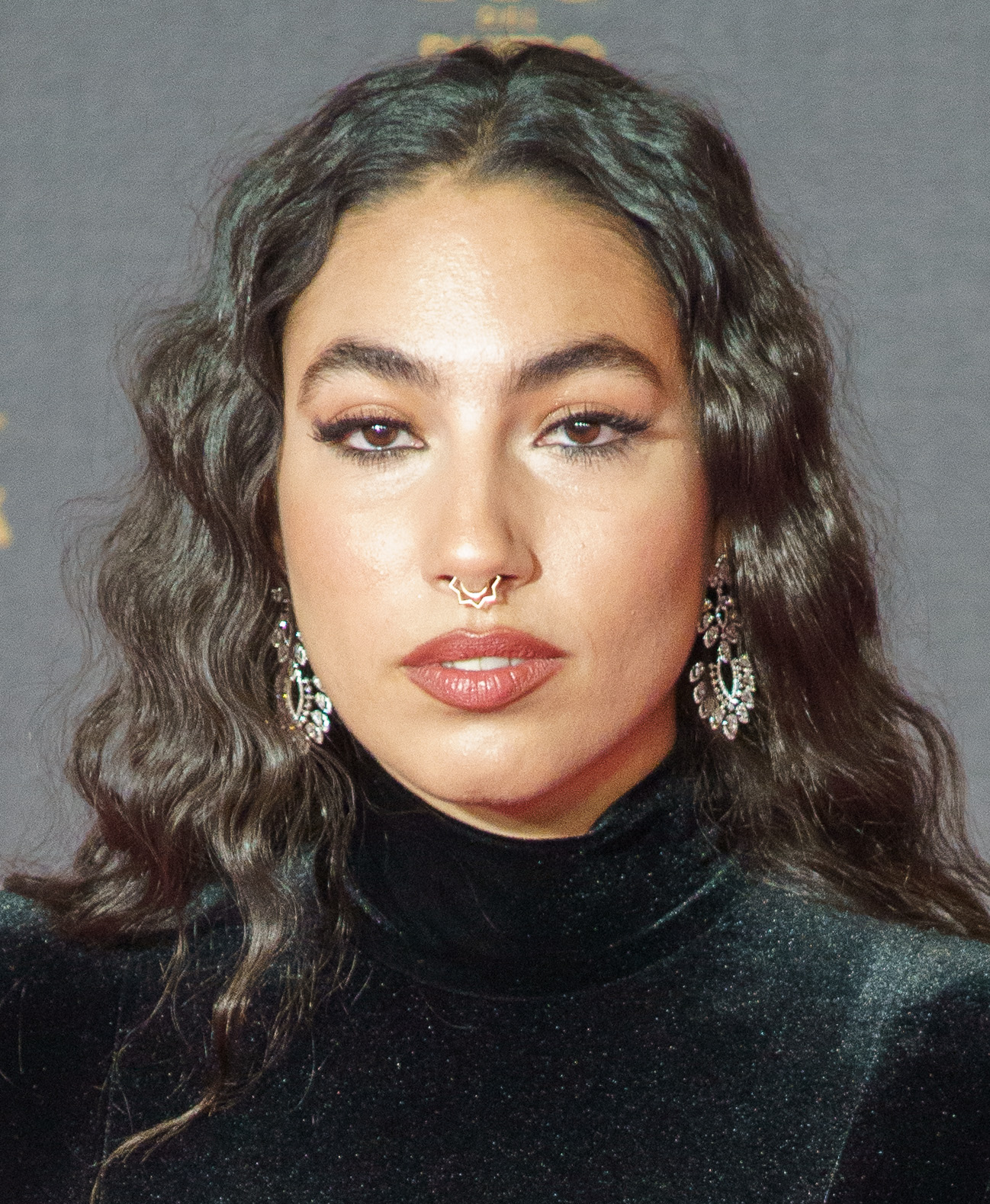
- Llergo in 2024

Background information
- Born: 1994 (age 30–31); Pozoblanco, Andalusia, Spain
- Genres: Flamenco; Flamenco pop
- Occupation: Singer
- Instrument: Vocals
- Years active: 2018–present

María José Llergo (born 1994) is a Spanish singer.

== Biography ==
Born in Pozoblanco, in 1994, Llergo joined the local violin school at a young age. She also stood out in the choir of the Colegio Concepcionistas. Owing to being granted a musical scholarship, she moved to Barcelona when she was 19 years old, continuing her musical education, starting a professional career as a singer.

Llergo's first single was "Niña de las dunas" (2018), performing alongside guitarist Marc López. After the release of several songs such as "Nana del Mediterráneo" or "Me miras pero no ves", she published her first EP, Sanación, in 2020. In 2022, she won a Goya award for her song "Te Espera El Mar", which formed part of the soundtrack for the Spanish film Mediterráneo. In June, it was announced that José Llergo would collaborate with Zahara for her reissue "REPUTA". The song was released on September 23, alongside the album's release.

== Discography ==
=== EPs ===
- Sanación (2020)

=== Singles ===
- Niña de las Dunas (2017)
- Me Miras Pero No Me Ves (2019)
- Nana del Mediterráneo (2019)
- Nana de los Rosales (feat. Paquete) (2019)
- El Péndulo (2019)
- El Hombre de las Mil Lunas (2020)
- ¿De Qué Me Sirve Llorar? (2020)
- Soy Como El Oro (2020)
- Pena, Penita, Pena (Lola Flores cover) (2020)
- A Través De Ti (2020)
- La Luz (with Didi Gutman$, hyhook) (2020)
- Que Tú Me Quieras (2021)
- Te Espera El Mar (2021)
- SANSA (REPUTA) (Zahara feat. María José Llergo) (2022)

=== Albums ===
- ULTRABELLEZA (2023)

== Awards and nominations ==
Year	Award	Category	Work	Result	Ref.
2022	36th Goya Awards	Best Original Song	"Te espera el mar" (Mediterraneo: The Law of the Sea)	Won	
