= I Don't Run =

Studio album by Hinds
- Released: 6 April 2018
- Studios: Paco Loco Studios, Cádiz
- Genre: Garage rock
- Length: 39:40
- Labels: Lucky Number; Mom + Pop
- Producers: Hinds; Gordon Raphael

Hinds chronology
Leave Me Alone (2016)	I Don't Run (2018)	The Prettiest Curse (2020)

Singles from I Don't Run
- 1. "New for You" Released: 2018; 2. "The Club" Released: 2018; 3. "Finally Floating" Released: 2018

I Don't Run is the second studio album by Spanish garage rock band Hinds. It was released on April 6, 2018, by Mom + Pop Music and is the band's first studio album since Leave Me Alone in 2016. The band worked on the album with Gordon Raphael, who produced albums for American band The Strokes and singer Regina Spektor. The album was preceded by the singles and music videos for "New For You", "The Club" and "Finally Floating". On October 1, 2018, Hinds released an alternative acoustic version of "Rookie" through Amazon Music, inspired by a relaxed version of "Revolution" by The Beatles.

== Music and lyrics ==
I Don't Run features jangling guitar and the interplay of dual vocalists Ana Perrote and Carlotta Cosials, with critics making musical comparisons to The Strokes, The Velvet Underground, The Breeders, Beach House, and The Libertines. The album includes both upbeat and relaxed songs, employing vocal harmonies, chants, guitar riffs, and fuzzed vocals.

Lyrically, the album deals with more mature themes than Leave Me Alone, including the unglamorous realities of awkward romantic situations, infidelity, long-distance romance, and the loneliness of touring. The album includes lyrics in both English and Spanish.

== Reception ==
Professional ratings
Aggregate scores
Source	Rating
AnyDecentMusic?	7.4/10
Metacritic	77/100
Review scores
Source	Rating
AllMusic	4/5 stars
The A.V. Club	B−
The Independent	4/5 stars
NME	4/5 stars
The Observer	4/5 stars
Pitchfork	7.4/10
Q	3/5 stars
Rolling Stone	4/5 stars
Uncut	7/10
Vice (Expert Witness)	A−

I Don't Run received uniformly positive reviews upon its release. Critics praised Hinds's ability to remain playful and authentic even while maturing their lyrics and diversifying their sound. Several critics noted an increase in sophistication of song structure and precision compared to their first album, with Stuart Berman of Pitchfork praising its "superior songcraft." Rolling Stone's Will Hermes called the album a "gem of indie-rock revivalism," and described the album's musical qualities as "bouncy pluck, boozy melodicism and hard-sparkling guitars." For Flood Magazine, Lydia Pudzianowski wrote that Hinds has "learned a lot since their breakout, resulting in a more confident sound that amplifies what made people love the band in the first place."

With respect to the album's lyrics, The Independent's Ilana Kaplan wrote that they are intended to be taken seriously, even as the band "thrives on its imperfections." Pitchfork's Berman wrote that the "audible sense of camaraderie" between the two vocalists, Ana Perrote and Carlotta Cosials, is the strongest characteristic of the album. Discussing a weak point of the album in an otherwise positive review, Jordan Bassett of NME wrote that the album does not push musical boundaries, but rather mostly draws on sounds from past decades.

In June 2018, Rolling Stone included I Don't Run on its list of "50 Best Albums of 2018 So Far", with Will Hermes praising its "off-handed magnificence" and comparing the drum beats to those of The Velvet Underground's Moe Tucker.

== Track listing ==
All tracks were written by Hinds (Carlotta Cosials, Amber Grimbergen, Ade Martín, and Ana Perrote). All tracks were produced by Hinds and Gordon Raphael, except "New for You", which was produced by Hinds.

No.	Title	Length
1.	"The Club"	3:17
2.	"Soberland"	2:45
3.	"Linda"	3:34
4.	"New for You"	3:26
5.	"Echoing My Name"	3:36
6.	"Tester"	3:54
7.	"Finally Floating"	4:06
8.	"I Feel Cold But I Feel More"	3:51
9.	"To the Morning Light"	3:41
10.	"Rookie"	3:13
11.	"Ma Nuit"	4:17
Total length:		39:40

== Personnel ==
=== Hinds ===
- Carlotta Cosials – vocals, guitar
- Amber Grimbergen – drums
- Ade Martín – bass guitar
- Ana García Perrote – vocals, guitar

=== Additional personnel ===
- Shawn Everett – mixing
- Paco Loco – engineering
- Gordon Raphael – production
- Neelam Khan Vela – photography

== Charts ==
Chart (2018)	Peak position
Spanish Albums (Promusicae)	31
UK Albums (Official Charts)	77
UK Independent Albums (Official Charts)	11
US Heatseekers Albums (Billboard)	8
US Independent Albums (Billboard)	22
