= Triángulo de Amor Bizarro (2007 album) =

Studio album by Triángulo de Amor Bizarro
- Released: 2007
- Length: 33:09
- Label: Mushroom Pillow
- Producer: Carlos Hernandez

Triángulo de Amor Bizarro chronology
Triángulo de Amor Bizarro (2007)	El Hombre del Siglo V (2007)

Professional ratings
Review scores
Source	Rating
LaFonoteca	4/5 stars
MondoSonoro	8/10 stars

Triángulo de Amor Bizarro, is the first album by the Galician band Triángulo de Amor Bizarro, released in 2007 by Mushroom Pillow. The album received wide acclaim and was ranked as one of the best albums of the year and the decade by three publications.

== Track listing ==
No.	Title	Length
1.	"El Himno de la Bala"	3:31
2.	"El Crimen: Cómo Ocurre y Cómo Remediarlo"	3:21
3.	"¿Quiénes Son Los Curanderos?"	3:06
4.	"El Fantasma de la Transición"	3:17
5.	"Mal Como Efecto de Mala Voluntad"	2:46
6.	"Estrella Azul de España"	3:04
7.	"Ardió la Virgen de Las Cabezas"	6:22
8.	"Cómo Iluminar Una Habitación"	3:30
9.	"Isa vs. El Partido Humanista"	2:06
10.	"Para Los Seres Atados (A Las Condiciones Terrenas)"	2:05

== Accolades ==
Publication	Accolade	Year	Rank
Club Fonograma	The 50 Best Albums of The Decade	2009	7
MondoSonoro	The 100 Best Albums of The Decade	2009	33
Jenesaispop	The 100 Best Albums of The Decade	2009	30
