= Leave Me Alone (Hinds album) =

Studio album by Hinds
- Released: 8 January 2016
- Studios: Paco Loco Studios, Cádiz
- Genre: Garage rock
- Length: 37:58
- Labels: Lucky Number; Mom + Pop
- Producer: Diego García

Hinds chronology
Leave Me Alone (2016)	I Don't Run (2018)

Singles from Leave Me Alone
- 1. "Chili Town" Released: 2015; 2. "Garden" Released: 2015; 3. "San Diego" Released: 2015; 4. "Easy" Released: 2016; 5. "Warts" Released: 2016; 6. "Bamboo" Released: 2016

Leave Me Alone is the debut full-length studio album by Spanish garage rock band Hinds. It was released on 8 January 2016 under Lucky Number and Mom + Pop Music. The album follows several singles and a 10"-compilation the band released between 2014 and 2016 as a duo and since adding drummer Amber Grimbergen and bassist Ade Martín as a quartet. "Chili Town", "Garden" "San Diego", "Easy" and "Warts" were released as singles and music videos.

In October 2016 a deluxe edition of Leave Me Alone was released, featuring a bonus disc of B-sides, rarities and cell phone demos that were mostly recorded prior to the album's recording. An animated music video for "Bamboo" was released to promote the deluxe edition.

== Music and lyrics ==
Leave Me Alone has been described as a set of cheerful, casual, lo-fi, guitar-driven pop songs, with many critics referring to the music as "surf-rock". Most songs feature duets by the band's two vocalists, Ana Perrote and Carlotta Cosials. The songs are sung in English, and thematically cover positive and negative romantic situations, among other subjects.

== Reception ==
Professional ratings
Aggregate scores
Source	Rating
AnyDecentMusic?	7.3/10
Metacritic	74/100
Review scores
Source	Rating
AllMusic	3/5 stars
Financial Times	4/5 stars
The Guardian	4/5 stars
NME	4/5
The Observer	3/5 stars
Pitchfork	7.5/10
Q	4/5 stars
Rolling Stone	3.5/5 stars
Spin	6/10
Uncut	7/10

Leave Me Alone received mostly positive reviews upon its release, largely describing the album as playful, energetic, and exuberant, although some critics identified a more serious and gloomy side to the music. Though drawing comparisons to many other similarly unpolished garage rock bands, critics praised the album's distinctive success at conveying the band's camaraderie and their enthusiasm for their music. Noel Gardner of NME commented on "the impression [the album] gives of Hinds as a tight-knit girl gang," and Spin's Harley Brown wrote that the band often sounds like "they got carried away with the sheer good fortune of discovering their musical talent -- and how much fun it is playing with each other."

The dual vocalists were identified as one of the best aspects of the album, with Quinn Moreland of Pitchfork writing that "the best moments on Leave Me Alone occur when Cosials and Perrote are going all-out, belting together without restraint."

The album has also been criticized for not expanding creatively beyond other bands in the genre, with Spin's Gardner writing that "it's a little hard to avoid feeling like you've heard this one before." Ken Capobianco of The Boston Globe criticized the predictability of the songs, saying that he hopes the band's songwriting improves in the future, and that "too many songs... seem like first drafts."

== Track listing ==
No.	Title	Length
1.	"Garden"	4:07
2.	"Fat Calmed Kiddos"	3:02
3.	"Warts"	2:35
4.	"Easy"	2:24
5.	"Castigadas en el Granero"	3:46
6.	"Solar Gap"	2:25
7.	"Chili Town"	3:17
8.	"Bamboo"	3:49
9.	"San Diego"	2:30
10.	"And I Will Send Your Flowers Back"	3:34
11.	"I'll Be Your Man"	3:17
12.	"Walking Home"	3:12
Total length:		37:58

Deluxe edition bonus disc
No.	Title	Length
1.	"Holograma" (Los Nastys cover)
2.	"When It Comes to You" (Dead Ghosts cover)
3.	"Castigadas en el Granero" (Barn version)
4.	"Between Cans" (Barn version)
5.	"Trippy Gum"
6.	"Davey Crockett" (Thee Headcoats cover)
7.	"Whiskey" (demo of unreleased song, 11 January 2014)
8.	"Walking Home" (demo, 16 April 2015)
9.	"San Diego" (demo, 6 August 2014)
10.	"Fat Calmed Kiddos" (demo, 24 May 2014)
11.	"Chili Town" (demo, 28 February 2015)
12.	"Castigadas en el Granero" (8-bit version)

== Personnel ==
Credits for Leave Me Alone adapted from album liner notes.

=== Hinds ===
- Carlotta Cosials – vocals, guitar
- Amber Grimbergen – drums
- Ade Martín – bass guitar
- Ana García Perrote – vocals, guitar

=== Additional personnel ===
- Miqui Brightside – photography
- Diego García – mixing, production
- Paco Loco – mixing
- Ashley Standford – photography

== Charts ==
Chart (2016)	Peak position
Belgian Albums (Ultratop Flanders)	176
ERROR in "Oricon": Invalid position: 273. Expected number 1–200 or dash (–).
UK Albums (Official Charts)	47
UK Independent Albums (Official Charts)	3
US Heatseekers Albums (Billboard)	4
US Independent Albums (Billboard)	9
US Top Alternative Albums (Billboard)	21
US Top Rock Albums (Billboard)	20
