= Hinds (band) =

Spanish indie rock band

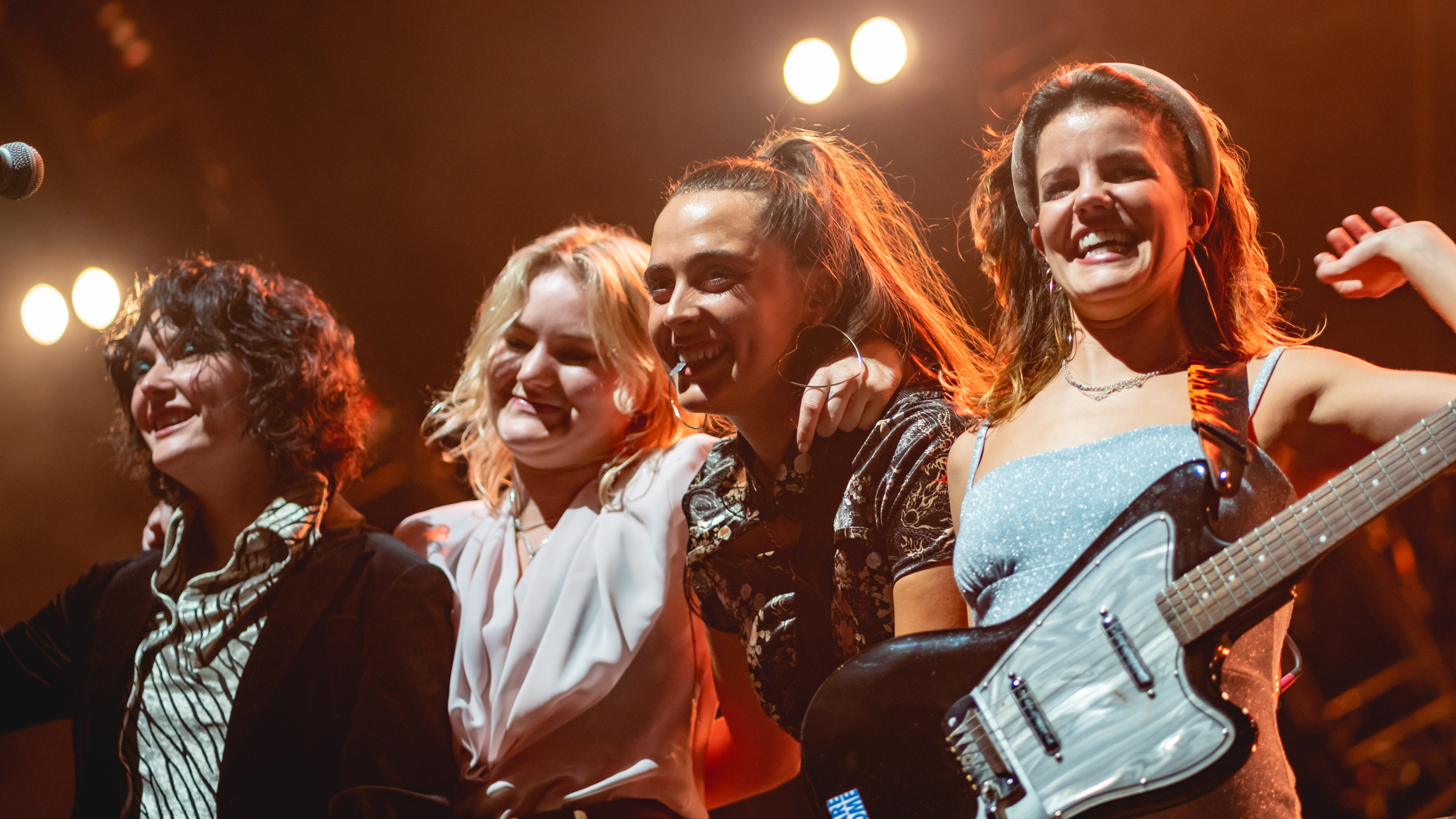
- Hinds (From left: Ade Martin, Amber Grimbergen, Ana Perrote and Carlota Cosials) performing live in December 2019

Background information
- Origin: Madrid, Comunidad de Madrid, Spain
- Genres: Indie rock; lo-fi; garage rock
- Years active: 2011–present
- Labels: Lucky Number; Burger Records; Mom + Pop
- Members: Carlotta Cosials; Ana Perrote
- Past members: Ade Martín; Amber Grimbergen
- Website: vivahinds.com

Hinds is a Spanish indie rock band from Madrid, formed in 2011 by Carlotta Cosials (vocals, guitar) and Ana Perrote (vocals, guitar). The original name of the band was Deers, but they changed it at the end of 2014 after a threat of legal action from the similarly named band The Dears. The group chose "Hinds", an English word of Germanic origin that means "does" or "female deers", as the new name of the band and officially implemented the name change on 7 January 2015. In 2014, Ade Martin (bass, backing vocals) and drummer Amber Grimbergen (drums) were added to the band and remained with the band until their departure in 2023.

They have released four albums, one compilation LP, and numerous singles. Their first studio album, Leave Me Alone, was released on 8 January 2016, and their second studio album, I Don't Run, was released on 6 April 2018. The band's third studio album, The Prettiest Curse, was released on 5 June 2020. Their fourth studio album, Viva Hinds, their first album without Martin and Grimbergen, was released on 6 September 2024.

== History ==
=== Duo ===
Hinds started in 2011 as a duo called Deers, consisting of Carlotta Cosials and Ana Perrote. After a break of a year and a half, the duo reformed in 2013. In March 2014, still as a duo, they recorded the tracks "Bamboo" and "Trippy Gum" and released both songs in Bandcamp as "Demo". The single was praised by music magazines including NME and by Paul Lester of The Guardian, who chose Deers as "new band of the week" in September 2014, and by major musicians, such as Patrick Carney, The Pastels, and Bobby Gillespie.

=== Four piece ===
After releasing "Demo" the duo became a four piece, with close friend Ade Martín on bass and Netherlands-born Amber Grimbergen on drums.

In May 2014, Deers won the "Make Noise Malasaña" festival contest and were rewarded with recording their second single "Barn" in Converse Rubber Tracks Studio in Berlin. In June 2014 Deers played London for the first time and the following month "Demo" was released on vinyl by the record labels Lucky Number Music (UK) and Mom + Pop Music (USA). Later in 2014 they also played Germany and France, amongst other countries, and supported The Libertines, The Vaccines and Black Lips.

During this time they received positive reviews in Pitchfork, Pigeons and Planes, Gorilla vs. Bear, The Irish Times, Paste, and DIY. On 3 November 2014, they released the single "Barn" with the tracks "Castigadas en el granero" ("Punished in the Barn") and "Between Cans". Once again it was released by Lucky Number and was well received by the press.

=== World tour ===
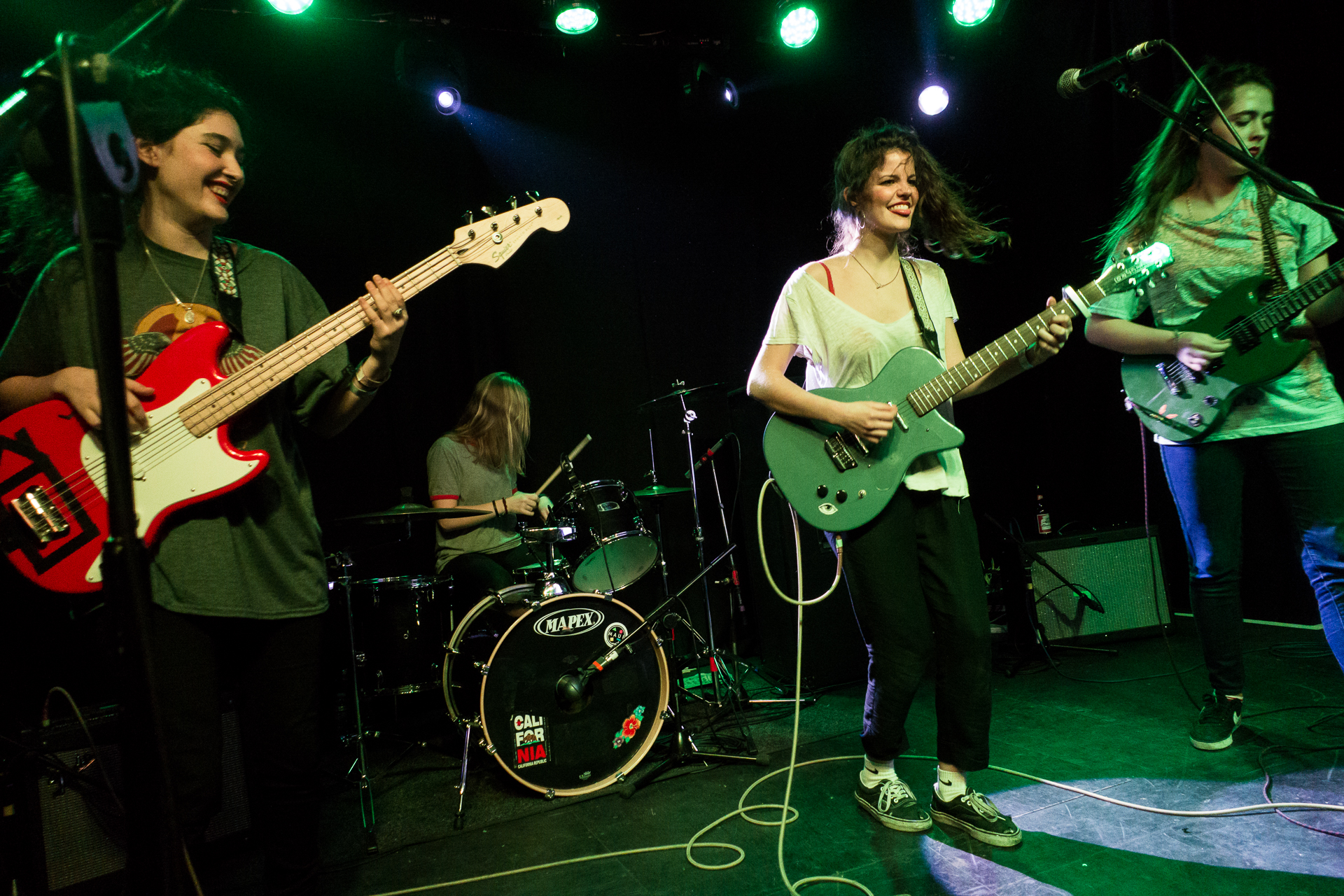
Hinds in London during their 2015 world tour

In 2015, the band embarked on their first world tour, having already played Thailand and Australia in February and the United States in March, and played many major festivals, including Festival Internacional de Benicàssim, South by Southwest (where they played 16 concerts in just four days), Burgerama, Best Kept Secret and Dot to Dot Festival.

=== Leave Me Alone ===
On 13 April 2015, they began recording their debut album, with Paco Loco and Diego García (from The Parrots) as producer and engineer respectively. The band also released a split single in April with The Parrots for Record Store Day, featuring the track “Davey Crockett (Gabba Hey!)", a cover from Thee Headcoats, produced by Árni Árnason from The Vaccines.

The band's debut album Leave Me Alone was released on 8 January 2016 on the label Lucky Number. The album featured 12 tracks, including a new single "Garden", previous singles "Bamboo", "Castigadas en el granero" ("Punished in the barn") and "Chili Town", and several new tracks. The album debuted at number 47 on the UK Albums Chart and charted on the Oricon weekly albums chart in Japan. A deluxe version of the album was released in September 2016 and featured previously released B-sides, 2 new cover songs and the first-take demos of tracks from the original album.

In August 2016, Very Best of Hinds So Far was released on the Mom & Pop Music label. The limited to 2,500 copies 10-inch LP featured six songs (the band's singles that were released prior to their debut album, and one live song).

In February 2017, the band designed an exclusive clothing line through Urban Outfitters that also included an exclusive limited edition 7-inch of their song "Holograma", with 50% of the proceeds of sales going to Attendance Records, an Austin-based non-profit providing students at public schools a platform to create, write and produce their own albums and magazines.

=== I Don't Run ===
Production of the second Hinds album began in March 2017. In July 2017, Hinds performed the main title track to Disney movie Cars 3 for the Spanish version of the movie's soundtrack. On 11 August 2017, Hinds released a cover of Kevin Ayers' "Caribbean Moon" that was recorded while making their second album. The band's second album, I Don't Run, was released on 6 April 2018. The album was preceded by the singles and music videos for "New For You", "The Club" and "Finally Floating". In October 2018, the band released the new single "British Mind" along with a music video.

=== The Prettiest Curse ===
The third Hinds studio album, The Prettiest Curse, was released on 5 June 2020 on Mom + Pop Music. It was originally scheduled for 3 April 2020, but was delayed because of the 2019-20 coronavirus pandemic. It includes more diverse instrumentation than previous albums, as well as singing in Spanish. During the pandemic, Hinds recorded a video performance of two songs, "New For You" and "Come Back and Love Me". The video was recorded separately at each band members' home and edited together for release through the Rolling Stone website.

In the recording sessions for The Prettiest Curse, the band also recorded a cover of "Spanish Bombs" by The Clash. Explaining why they chose that song, the band said, "As Spaniards, we don’t usually get shout-outs in songs, like New York or London, so the Clash writing a song about our civil war made us feel honored." They released the song on 31 July 2020 and performed it on 21 August 2020 during a live stream 68th birthday tribute show to Joe Strummer called "A Song for Joe: Celebrating the Life of Joe Strummer".

On 21 August 2020, Hinds released a single jointly with Japanese band CHAI called "United Girls Rock'n'Roll Club", which has lyrics in Spanish, Japanese, and English. The song was released with a music video.

=== Departure of Ade and Amber and fourth studio album Viva Hinds ===
On 25 July 2023, Hinds through their social media confirmed in a letter from Ade Martin and Amber Grimbergen that they had quit the band in December 2022. As of May 2023, the group had already been performing shows with new touring members Paula Ruiz (bass, backing vocals) and Maria Lázaro (drums). Since leaving the group, Martin went on to release her own music under the name Shanghai Baby and Grimbergen began releasing her own solo music in 2025 under the name Amber Grimbo.

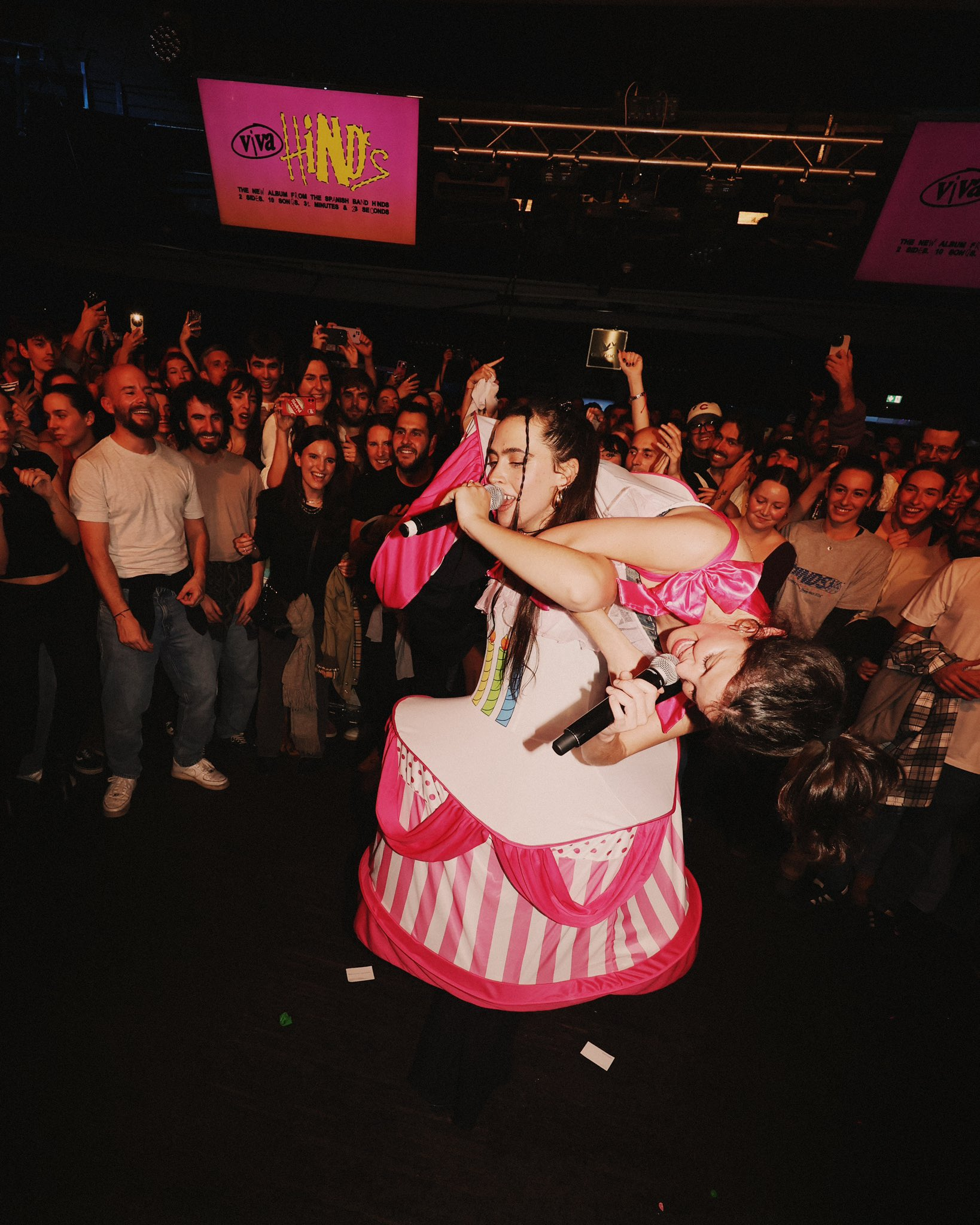
Carlotta Cosials and Ana Perrote in Madrid for the Viva Hinds World Tour at the Teatro Barcelo (24 January 2025)

In early 2024, Hinds completed work on their fourth studio album. On 28 February 2024, Hinds released a new song called "Coffee" and on 7 May 2024, Hinds released another new song called Boom Boom Back, which features Beck. Their fourth album, Viva Hinds, was released on 6 September 2024. The album was record as a duo and without their new touring members Ruiz and Lázaro. The album's third single, "En Forma", was released on 12 June 2024, the fourth single, "Superstar", was released on 23 July 2024, and the fifth single, "The Bed, the Room, the Rain and You", was released on 14 August 2024. Following the release of Viva Hinds, Rolling Stone listed Viva Hinds in their 100 Best Albums of 2024 at number 81.

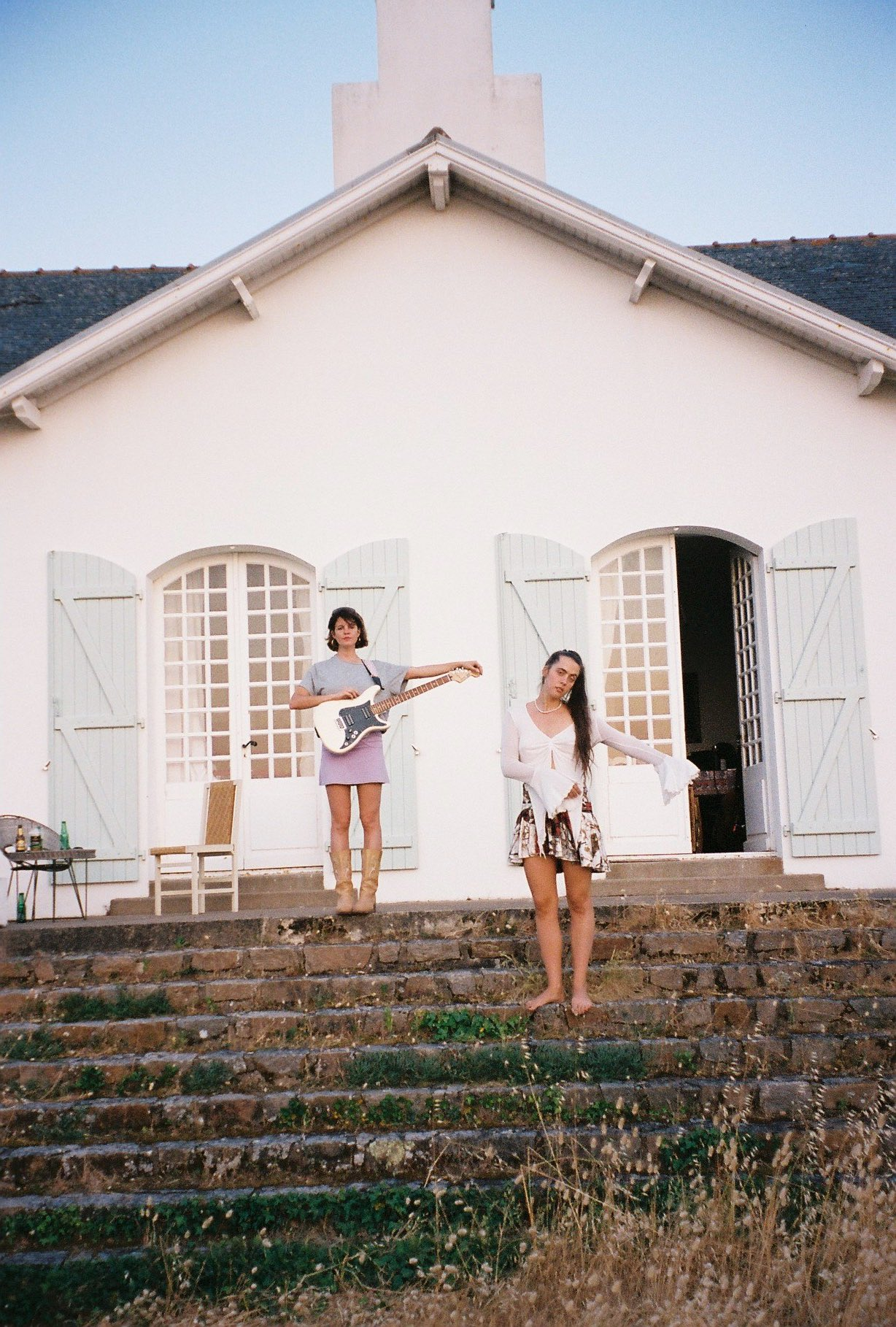
Carlotta Cosials and Ana Perrote in France during the Viva Hinds recording sessions (2023)

On 9 September 2025 to celebrate the one year anniversary of Viva Hinds, the band released a cover of the Charli xcx song "Girl, So Confusing" as a single and music video. The song, which was recorded during the Summer of 2025, marks the band's first studio recording with Ruiz and Lázaro.

== Musical style ==
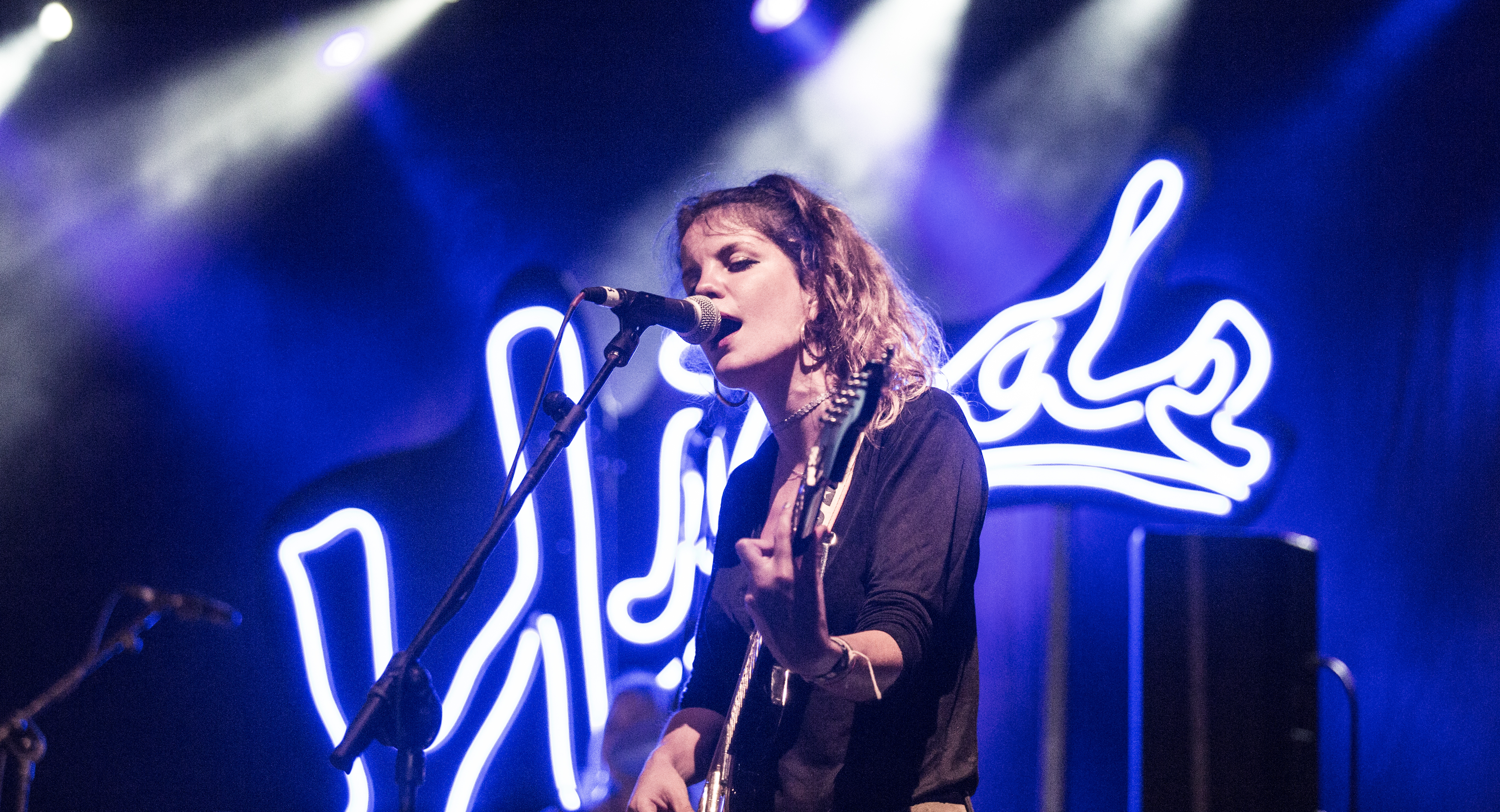
Carlotta Cosials at Festival Internacional de Benicàssim 2016

Hinds are considered a garage rock, garage pop and lo-fi band, and have been compared to a blend of rock bands such as Velvet Underground, The Pastels, and C86-like bands, contemporary garage rock and 1960s groups with a pop sound, although they have mentioned Black Lips, Ty Segall, The Parrots, The Strokes, The Vaccines, and Mac DeMarco as their main influences.

== Instruments ==
In a 2020 interview with Mixdown, Hinds talked about the instruments they play. Former bassist Ade Martin played a 1966 Kalamazoo KB1 short-scale bass guitar with a Fender Bassman 100T amplifier and Fender Bassman 810 Neo Enclosure cabinet. Guitarist and singer Ana Perrote plays a Fender American Jazzmaster with a Fender Hot Rod Deluxe IV amplifier, and Casio keyboards. Former drummer Amber Grimbergen played a Gretsch drum kit with Zildjian cymbals, along with a Roland SPD-SX sampling pad. Guitarist and singer Carlotta Cosials plays a Gibson SG Standard Ebony with a Fender Hot Rod DeVille 212 IV amplifier.

== Members ==
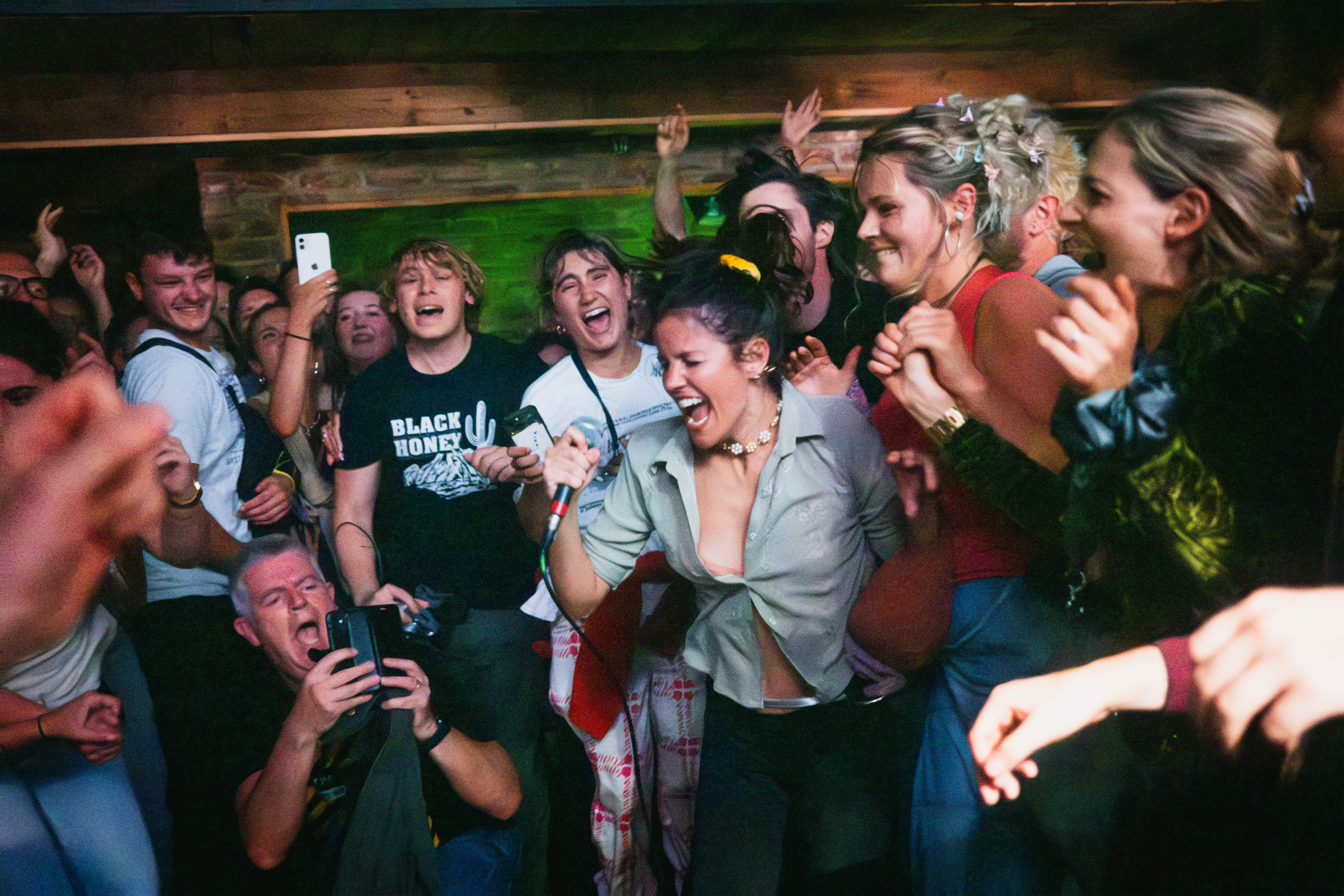
Hinds in the UK in 2024 by Paul Hudson

Current

- Carlotta Cosials – vocals, guitar (2011–present)
- Ana Perrote – vocals, guitar (2011–present)

Former

- Ade Martin – bass, backing vocals (2014–2022)
- Amber Grimbergen – drums (2014–2022)

Touring

- Paula Ruiz – bass, backing vocals (2023–present)
- Maria Lázaro – drums (2023–present)

== Discography ==
=== Albums ===
- Leave Me Alone (2016) UK #47
- I Don't Run (2018) UK #77
- The Prettiest Curse (2020)
- Viva Hinds (2024)

=== Compilation ===
- Very Best of Hinds so Far (2015) (10-inch LP limited to 2,500 copies)

=== Singles ===
- "Demo" as Deers (2014)
- "Barn" as Deers (2014)
- "Split 7-inch w/ The Parrots (2015)
- "Chili Town" (2015)
- "Garden" (2015)
- "San Diego" (2015)
- "Easy" (2016)
- "Warts" (2016)
- "Bamboo" (2016)
- "Holograma" (2016)
- "Holograma" (2017) (limited edition 7-inch pink vinyl exclusive for Urban Outfitters)
- El Sueño De Benilandia split 7-inch w/ Los Nastys (2017) (limited to 1,000 copies on translucent blood red vinyl)
- "Caribbean Moon" (2017)
- "British Mind" (2018)
- "Riding Solo" (2019)
- "Good Bad Times" (2020)
- "Come Back and Love Me <3" (2020)
- Just Like Kids (Miau)" (2020)
- "Burn" (2020)
- "Spanish Bombs" (2020)
- "United Girls Rock'n'Roll Club" w/ Chai (2020)
- "De la Monarquía a la Criptocracia" (2021)
- "¿Y Cómo?" w/ Bratty (2022)
- "Coffee" (2024)
- "Boom Boom Back" ft. Beck (2024)
- "En Forma" (2024)
- "Superstar" (2024)
- "The Bed, the Room, the Rain and You" (2024)
- "Girl, So Confusing" (2025)

=== Music videos ===
- "Bamboo" (2014)
- "Trippy Gum" (2014)
- "Castigadas en el Granero" (2014)
- "Chili Town" (2015)
- "Davey Crockett" (2015)
- "Garden" (2015)
- "San Diego" (2015)
- "Easy" (2016)
- "Warts" (2016)
- "Bamboo" (animated video) (2016)
- "New For You" (2018)
- "The Club" (2018)
- "Finally Floating" (2018)
- "British Mind" (2018)
- "Riding Solo" (2019)
- "Good Bad Times" (2020)
- "Just Like Kids (Miau)" (2020)
- "Burn" (2020)
- "United Girls Rock'n'Roll Club" with Chai (2020)
- "Coffee" (2024)
- "Boom Boom Back" ft. Beck (2024)
- "En Forma" (2024)
- "Superstar" (2024)
- "The Bed, the Room, the Rain and You" (2024)
- "Girl, So Confusing" (2025)
