= Triángulo de Amor Bizarro (2020 album) =

Studio album by Triángulo de Amor Bizarro
- Released: 2020
- Length: 42:03
- Label: Mushroom Pillow

Triángulo de Amor Bizarro chronology
El Gatopardo (2018)	Triángulo de Amor Bizarro (2020)

Professional ratings
Review scores
Source	Rating
LaFonoteca	5/5 stars
MondoSonoro	8/10

Triángulo de Amor Bizarro (stylized as oɹɹɐzıqɹoɯɐǝpolnƃuɐıɹʇ) is the fifth album by the Galician band Triángulo de Amor Bizarro, released in 2020 by Mushroom Pillow. The album peaked at number five in Spain.

== Background ==
The idea behind the album was to start a new path with their fifth album. Leave the first four as a unit and separate both blocks with the conceptual EP El Gatopardo they released in 2018. The objective was to make a contemporary record, they comment that "it is our first contemporary pop album, it is an album in which we try to transmit our emotions reflected in the now, transformed and distorted by the technology we use to transmit them."

== Track listing ==
No.	Title	Length
1.	"Ruptura"	2:28
2.	"No Eres Tú"	5:20
3.	"Vigilantes del Espejo"	3:22
4.	"Canción de la Fama"	4:21
5.	"Fukushima"	6:01
6.	"ASMR para Ti"	5:22
7.	"Acosadores"	2:50
8.	"SYF, Paga"	0:33
9.	"Calígula 2025"	2:50
10.	"Folía de las Apariciones"	3:09
11.	"Cura Mi Corazón"	5:16
12.	"Los Golpes Olvidados"	0:31

== Charts ==
Chart (2020)	Peak position
Spanish Albums (PROMUSICAE)	5
