= Pablo Und Destruktion =

Music project by Pablo García

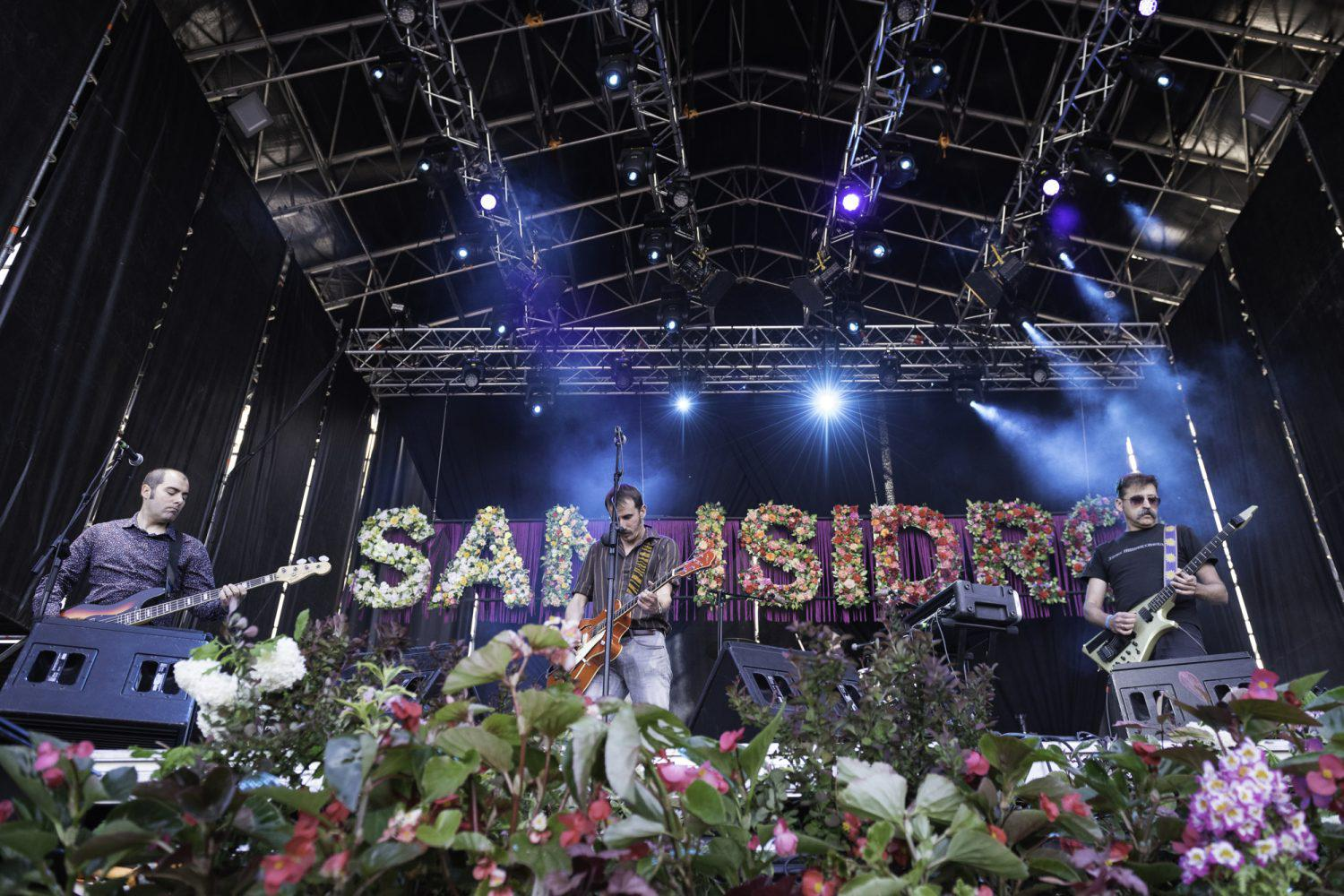
Pablo Und Destruktion performing in Madrid in 2018

Pablo Und Destruktion is a music project by Pablo García and originating from the region of Asturias in Spain. Pablo Und Destruktion first started by self-releasing a series of music videos on Vimeo, which ended up earning them an article on the widely popular Spain rock magazine MondoSonoro. As of 2017 they have over 5,000 fans on their Facebook page.

Their music has haunting electric guitars with fuzz effects and García is often seen in the music videos shirtless in the forest. The project’s albums appear in almost every significant music website in Spain, such as Jenesaispop.com. Spain's biggest newspaper El País said that Pablo Und Destruktion is capable of displaying social and political ideology with their music.

Discography

- animal con parachoques (2012)
- sangrín (2014)
- funeral de estado EP (2014)
- vigorexia emocional (2015)
- Canciones para antes de una guerra (2015)
- predación (2017)
- futuros valores (2020)
- ULTRAMONTE (2022)
- te quiere todo el mundo (2025)
