= Viva Hinds =

Studio album by Hinds
- Released: 6 September 2024
- Genre: Garage rock
- Length: 31:21
- Label: Lucky Number
- Producer: Pete Robertson

Hinds chronology
The Prettiest Curse (2020)	Viva Hinds (2024)

Singles from Viva Hinds
- 1. "Coffee" Released: 28 February 2024; 2. "Boom Boom Back" Released: 7 May 2024; 3. "En Forma" Released: 12 June 2024; 4. "Superstar" Released: 23 July 2024; 5. "The Bed, the Room, the Rain and You" Released: 14 August 2024

Viva Hinds is the fourth studio album by Spanish garage rock band Hinds. The album was released on 6 September 2024 under Lucky Number and is the band's first new album in four years since the 2020 release of The Prettiest Curse. Founding members Carlotta Cosials (vocals, guitar) and Ana García Perrote (vocals, guitar) recorded the album as a duo and it marks the first release by the band since the departure of Ade Martin (bassist) and Amber Grimbergen (drums) who quit the band in 2022 and were replaced the following year by touring members Paula Ruiz (bassist) and Maria Lázaro (drums) however the two did not appear on Viva Hinds.

Viva Hinds was preceded by the singles and music videos for "Coffee", "Boom Boom Back", "En Forma", "Superstar" and "The Bed, the Room, the Rain and You".

The album was produced by former drummer for The Vaccines, Pete Robertson, and features guest appearances by Beck and Grian Chatten from Fontaines D.C. The album also features songs in Spanish.

== Reception ==
Professional ratings
Aggregate scores
Source	Rating
Metacritic	81/100
Review scores
Source	Rating
Rolling Stone	4/5 stars

The album was acclaimed by critics. It was listed in The Independent as the 15th best album of 2024, with Mark Beaumont calling it "a sonic tapas platter of styles, all melting on the eardrum."

== Track listing ==
Viva Hinds track listing
No.	Title	Writer(s)	Length
1.	"Hi, How Are You"	Carlotta Cosials; Ana García Perrote; Jason Bell; Jordan Miller; Sean Silverman	2:38
2.	"The Bed, the Room, the Rain and You"	Cosials; Perrote; Silverman	2:28
3.	"Boom Boom Back" (featuring Beck)	Cosials; Perrote; Jennifer Decilveo; Beck Hansen; Silverman	3:25
4.	"Stranger" (featuring Grian Chatten)	Cosials; Perrote; Grian Chatten; Silverman	3:27
5.	"Superstar"	Cosials; Perrote	4:03
6.	"Mala Vista"	Cosials; Perrote; Javier Rodriguez	3:28
7.	"On My Own"	Cosials; Perrote; Silverman	2:32
8.	"Coffee"	Cosials; Perrote; Bell; Miller	2:30
9.	"En Forma"	Cosials; Perrote	3:48
10.	"Bon Voyage"	Cosials; Perrote; Rodriguez	3:02
Total length:			31:21

Digital bonus track
No.	Title	Length
11.	"Bats"	3:03

== Personnel ==
=== Hinds ===
- Carlotta Cosials – vocals, guitar
- Ana García Perrote – vocals, guitar

=== Technical ===
- Pete Robertson – production (all tracks), engineering (track 8)
- Matt Colton – mastering
- Caesar Edmunds – mixing
- Tom Roach – engineering

== Charts ==
Chart performance for Viva Hinds
Chart (2024)	Peak position
Scottish Albums (OCC)	31
UK Album Downloads (OCC)	40
UK Independent Albums (OCC)	8
