= The Prettiest Curse =

Studio album by Hinds
- Released: 5 June 2020
- Recorded: August–November 2019
- Studios: Bunker (Brooklyn); Strongroom (London)
- Genre: Garage rock
- Length: 32:45
- Labels: Lucky Number; Mom + Pop
- Producer: Jennifer Decilveo

Hinds chronology
I Don't Run (2018)	The Prettiest Curse (2020)	Viva Hinds (2024)

Singles from The Prettiest Curse
- 1. "Riding Solo" Released: December 3, 2019; 2. "Good Bad Times" Released: February 4, 2020; 3. "Come Back and Love Me <3" Released: March 6, 2020; 4. "Just Like Kids (Miau)" Released: April 28, 2020; 5. "Burn" Released: July 14, 2020

The Prettiest Curse is the third studio album by Spanish garage rock band Hinds. It was released on June 5, 2020 under Mom + Pop Music and follows 2018's I Don't Run. The album was recorded in New York City and produced by Jennifer Decilveo, who produced albums for Bat for Lashes, The Wombats, and Anne-Marie. The Prettiest Curse was preceded by the singles "Riding Solo", "Good Bad Times", "Come Back and Love Me <3", and "Just Like Kids (Miau)", along with music videos for "Good Bad Times", "Just Like Kids (Miau)" and "Burn".

The album is the final release by the group with members Ade Martin and Amber Grimbergen who left the band in December 2022.

== Recording and production ==
After spending time songwriting in Los Angeles and London, the band recorded The Prettiest Curse in London and New York. "Riding Solo" and "Just Like Kids (Miau)" were recorded in London, while the rest was recorded in Brooklyn, New York. Unlike their previous albums, The Prettiest Curse was not recorded during a concert tour. Singer and guitarist Carlotta Cosials told Rolling Stone about the leisurely recording pace, saying, "For the first time, we had time to sit down and not rush … and think not only ‘What do we want to tell to the world,’ but how we want to tell it.”

Speaking about the recording of the album, singer and guitarist Ana Perrote told BBC News, "Everything felt really different and exciting. We worked with different people and there's different instruments, like keyboards or just more Spanish [lyrically and sonically]."

During the recording of the album, the band had a practice of listening to a different band's album before each recording session, and another album afterward.

In describing producer Jenn Decilveo's influence on the album, the band said, "She made us yell louder than ever, would pretty much force us to do guitar solos every second she could and I think just helped us find our new sound identity."

== Music and lyrics ==
Musically, The Prettiest Curse contains a richer set of instruments than previous albums, including keyboards. The band also opted for more songs with pop melodies than on their previous albums.

Lyrically, this is Hinds' first album that contains their native language of Spanish. While the band said that they had opted for English lyrics after imitating bands they admire, they say that singing in Spanish has helped them continue to establish their identity.

In writing the album, the band stated that they were influenced by The Jesus and Mary Chain, Molotov, and Los Punsetes.

Speaking about the album's third single, "Come Back and Love Me <3", singer and guitarist Carlotta Cosials said that it is "the most romantic song we’ve ever done." She also said that the band "went full-spaniards here", including "bossa-nova vibes [drummer and bassist] Amber and Ade created".

The album's fourth single, "Just Like Kids (Miau)" addresses the all-female band's experiences of sexism in the music industry.

== Tutorial video ==
During the COVID-19 pandemic, Hinds published a tutorial video on Instagram for how to play "Come Back and Love Me <3". The video features each band member separately teaching how to play their own part in the song, as they are practicing social distancing during the pandemic. While the band was initially wary of giving an overly basic tutorial, they wanted it to be accessible to women and girls learning instruments for the first time. After the tutorial was released, fans posted videos showing what they learned.

== Release ==
The Prettiest Curse was originally scheduled to be released on April 3, 2020, but was delayed until June 5, 2020 because of the COVID-19 pandemic. Hinds decided that marketing the album during the pandemic would be uncomfortable. The band's corresponding tour for the album was cancelled. Along with the delay in releasing the album, they put on the following statement:

We all need music now more than ever, and we were so excited to release our album next month and share it with you! but right now, things are a bit scary in spain and the coronavirus is something that is affecting a lot of our loved ones, so for right now we think all of our focus should be on staying safe and staying home, not promoting a new album.

While recording The Prettiest Curse, the band also recorded a cover of "Spanish Bombs" by The Clash. They released the single as a flexi disc on July 31, 2020. In explaining how they chose to cover that song, the band wrote, "As Spaniards, we don’t usually get shout-outs in songs, like New York or London, so the Clash writing a song about our civil war made us feel honored."

== Reception ==
Professional ratings
Aggregate scores
Source	Rating
AnyDecentMusic?	7.6/10
Metacritic	78/100
Review scores
Source	Rating
AllMusic	4/5 stars
And It Don't Stop	A−
Clash	8/10
DIY	4/5 stars
NME	4/5 stars
Paste	8.5/10
Pitchfork	7.2/10
PopMatters	8/10
Q	3/5 stars
Rolling Stone	3.5/5 stars

At Metacritic, which assigns a weighted average rating out of 100 to reviews from mainstream publications, the release received an average score of 78, based on 15 reviews, which evaluates at "generally favorable reviews".

In an advance review of The Prettiest Curse for NME, Hannah Mylrea said, "Blending growling riffs worthy of The Strokes with soaring melodies and a generous dash of the band's no-fucks-given attitude, it's a break-neck 30 minutes of glorious chaos."

Writing for the Hampstead & Highgate Express, Stephen Moore called the album Hinds's "best record yet", writing that it is "highly listenable chart fodder, the lyrics centering on highly dysfunctional kidult relationships, and opens a record which explores the fertile crossovers between garage rock, disco, sampling, synth-pop and more."

In his "Consumer Guide" column, Robert Christgau hailed the album as "the charming maturation of these club kids who've mastered pop songcraft". He found that Hinds "emote ever more catchily about their ever twistier love lives" and "ponder possibilities that have gotten so much chancier" in the wake of a pandemic that gives the release a sharp poignancy.

== Track listing ==
All tracks are written by Hinds (Carlotta Cosials, Amber Grimbergen, Ade Martín, and Ana Perrote).

No.	Title	Length
1.	"Good Bad Times"	3:19
2.	"Just Like Kids (Miau)"	2:09
3.	"Riding Solo"	3:37
4.	"Boy"	3:17
5.	"Come Back And Love Me <3"	3:51
6.	"Burn"	2:54
7.	"Take Me Back"	3:11
8.	"The Play"	3:06
9.	"Waiting For You"	3:30
10.	"This Moment Forever"	3:53
Total length:		32:45

== Personnel ==
=== Hinds ===
- Carlotta Cosials – vocals, guitar, artwork
- Amber Grimbergen – drums
- Ade Martín – bass guitar
- Ana García Perrote – vocals, guitar

=== Additional contributors ===
- Jennifer Decilveo – production
- Emily Lazar – mastering
- Ben Baptie – mixing on all tracks except "Riding Solo"
- Dave Cerminara – mixing on "Riding Solo"
- Matt Wiggins – engineering
- Iggy Rathmann – demo recording
- Nico Yubero – demo recording
- Alex Conroy – musical assistance
- Grace Banks – musical assistance
- Ouka Leele – photography
- Maria Rosenfeldt – photography assistance
- Paula Yubero – photography assistance
- Rodrigo Autric – photography assistance

== Charts ==
Chart performance for The Prettiest Curse
Chart (2020)	Peak position
Scottish Albums (Official Charts)	14
