= Cala Vento =

Spanish Indie Rock Band

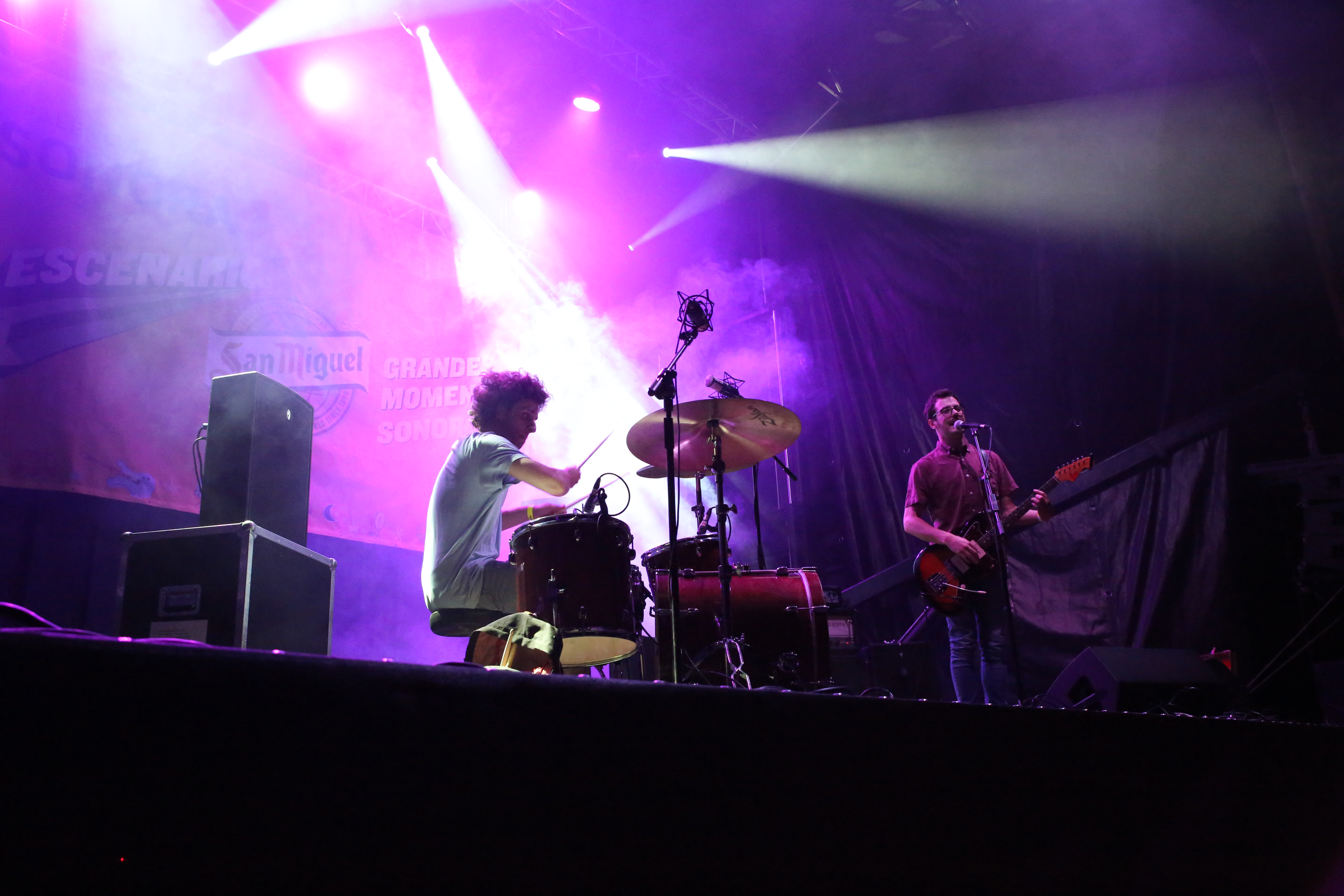
- Cala Vento performing in 2017

Background information
- Origin: Empordà (Girona)Catalonia Spain
- Genres: indie rock
- Works: #Discography
- Years active: 2014 - present
- Labels: Bcore, Montgrí
- Members: Joan Delgado; Aleix Turon
- Website: calavento.com

Cala Vento is a spanish indie rock music group formed by Joan Delgado and Aleix Turon, two friends from l'Empordà, after being selected to participate in a workshop training for new groups in which professionals from the sector supported them to improve their projection.

They have recorded four albums: ' Cala Vento' (BCore, 2016), 'Fruto Panorama' (BCore, 2017), 'Balanceo' (Montgrí, 2019) and 'Casa Linda' (Montgrí, 2023) and two EP's: 'Unos Poco y Otros Tanto' (BCore, 2015) and 'Canciones de sobra ' (BCore, 2018).

== Career ==
The group formed by Aleix (guitar) and Joan (drums) in 2014 in Barcelona, Spain inspired by the formula of Japandroids or Nueva Vulcano. After a break in their respective bands, they felt the need to play, rehearse and give concerts. The idea had been on Aleix's mind for some time, and he saw Joan as the perfect candidate. They took the name of their homeland, l'Empordà, a place where the wind and the coves are protagonists, and where they returned to the town of Flaçà to continue developing his career.

After self-releasing the 'Rossija' demo in 2014, with the help of Eric Fuentes (The Unfinished Sympathy) in production and Iban Rodríguez at the Lluerna study group, recorded the EP 'Unos pocos y otros tanto' at the end of 2015. Mixed by Santi García and mastered by Víctor García at Ultramarinos Costa Brava.

In 2016 they released the self-titled album, repeating with the production team of the previous EP, and re-recording the songs from the original demo. After this, they played in the United States at the South by Southwest festival, being well received by the public, especially in the Latino community. They also played in Primavera Sound 2016.

In 2017 they published their second full length, “Fruto Panorama”, where they included string arrangements (cello). The album was recorded by Santi Garcia, Víctor Garcia and Borja Pérez at Cal Pau Recordings and by Iban Rodríguez in Lluerna, and mixed by Santi García and mastered by Víctor García at Ultramarinos Costa Brava, garnering good reviews. This album was followed by the EP Canciones de Sobra.., with outtakes from this recording. In 2018 Lori Meyers personally chose them as the guest group at their 20th anniversary concert at the WiZink Center in Madrid.

In 2019 they released Balanceo, in which they dare to experiment with wind arrangements and melodies inspired by English pop, with influences from Prefab Sprout. They have the collaboration of Cándido Gálvez from Viva Belgrado and declare themselves fans of funk and classic groove, without losing brute force of its beginnings, and winking at Foo Fighters, Nirvana, or Weezer. They are qualified by the newspaper El País as "the duo of the season".

In 2020 they were nominated for the XII MIN independent music awards, winning the 'Gibson Award for Best Rock Album' by Balancingo. On January 29, 2021, they published a maxi single made up of two tracks, with the songs El acecho (how does he stop crying?) and Teletecho - a collaboration with Amaral. For the first time, they set aside their usual collaboration with Eric Fuentes and Santi Garcia to work with Martin Glover Youth, member of Killing Joke, and producer of bands like The Verve, Primal Scream or The Jesus and Mary Chain.

== Discography ==
=== Demos ===
- ROSSIJA (demo) (2014)

=== EPs ===
- Unos Poco y Otros Tanto (2015)
- Canciones de Sobra (2018)

=== Studio Album ===
- Cala Vento (2016)
- Fruto Panorama (2017)
- Balanceo (2019)
- Casa Linda (2023)
- Brindis (2025), álbum íntegramente de versiones
