= Los Planetas =

Spanish indie rock group

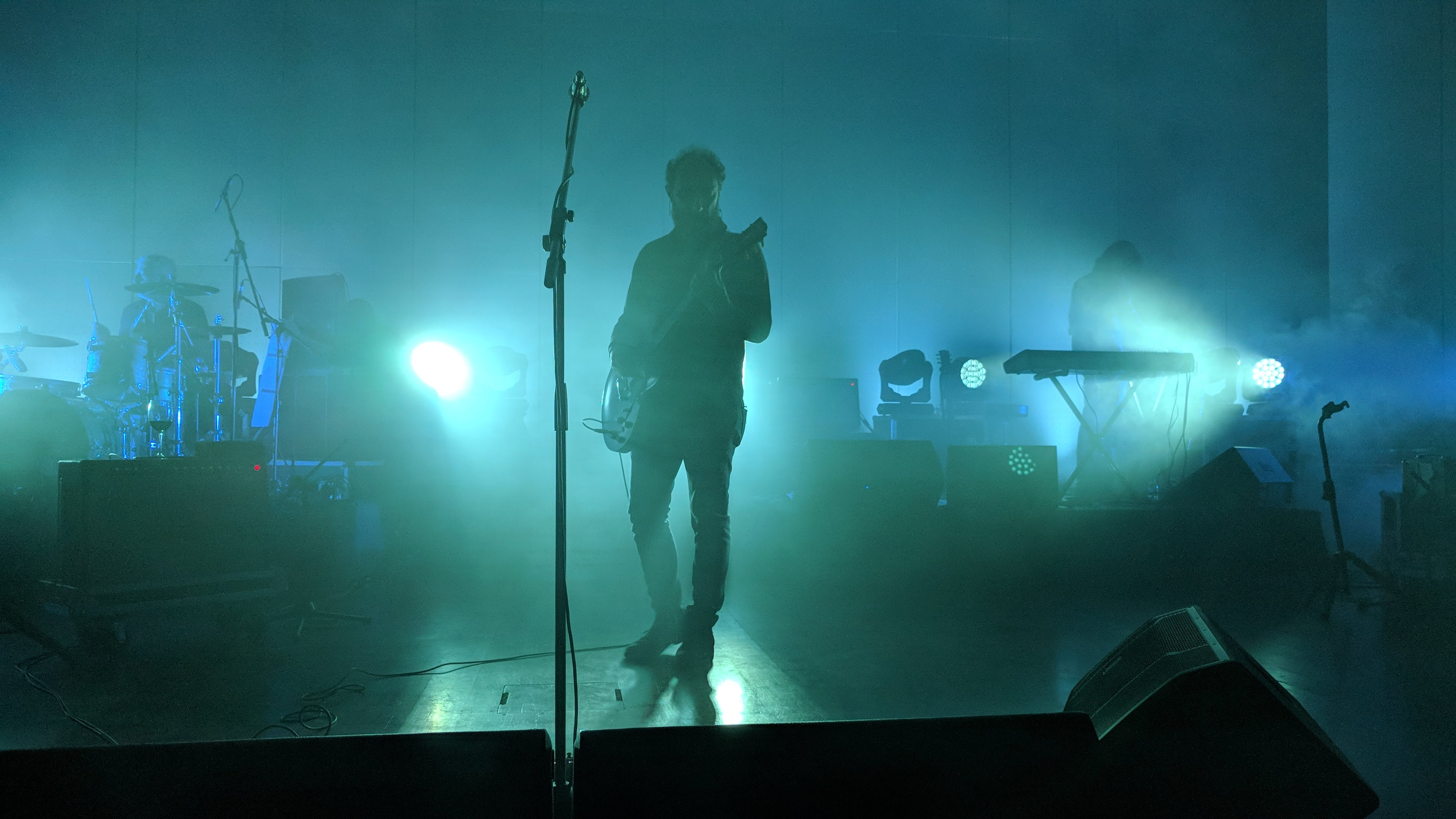
- Los Planetas playing in en A Coruña (Spain), 22 December 2017

Background information
- Origin: Granada, Spain
- Genres: Indie rock, shoegaze
- Years active: 1993–present
- Labels: Elefant Records; RCA-BMG; RCA-Sony BMG; Octubre-Sony Music Entertainment; El Segell del Primavera; El Ejército Rojo
- Members: Juan Ramón Rodríguez Cervilla (J); Florentino Muñoz Lozano (Florent); Ernesto Jiménez Linares (Eric); Alonso Díaz (Alonso); Miguel López
- Past members: May Oliver; Paco Rodríguez; Carlos Salmerón; Raúl Santos; Fernando Novi; Jesús Izquierdo; Kieran Stephen; Julián Méndez Podadera (Julián); Esteban Fraile Maldonado (Banin)

Los Planetas (The Planets) is a Spanish indie rock group from the city of Granada, formed in 1993. The group's first hit was "Qué puedo hacer" (What can I do?) from their album "Super 8", although they had previously achieved some success with various demos on a contest run by the Spanish national public radio station Radio 3.

After "Super 8" (1994 RCA-BMG Music Spain) the group produced albums which caught on quickly in the Spanish indie scene, including "Pop" (1996 RCA-BMG Music Spain), "Una semana en el motor de un autobús" (A week in the engine of a bus, 1998 RCA-BMG Music Spain), "Unidad de Desplazamiento" (Movement unit, 2000 RCA-BMG Music Spain), "Encuentro con entidades" (Encounter with entities, 2002 RCA-BMG Music Spain), "Los Planetas contra la ley la gravedad" (Los Planetas against the laws of gravity, 2004 RCA-BMG Music Spain), "La Leyenda del Espacio", and "Una Ópera Egipcia".

They have released two compilation albums: one including all of their singles and EPs in 1999, "Canciones para una orquesta química" (Songs for a chemical orchestra, 1999 RCA-BMG Music Spain), and a greatest hits album in 2009, "Principios básicos de astronomía" (Basic principles of astronomy, 2009 Octubre - Sony Music Entertainment).

Los Planetas are strongly influenced by English-language rock bands such as Joy Division and early-period Mercury Rev and are considered to be a key reference point in the world of Spanish Indie.

A notable influence from flamenco music is evident in their 2007 work ("La leyenda del espacio" (2007 RCA-Sony BMG), as well as in their latest albums "Una ópera egipcia" (2010, Octubre - Sony Music Entertainment) and "Zona temporalmente autónoma" (2017, El Ejército Rojo - El Volcán Música).

== Members ==
- Juan Ramón Rodríguez Cervilla / J Rodríguez / J / Jota: vocals and guitar
- Florentino Muñoz Lozano / Florent Muñoz / Florent: guitar
- Ernesto Jiménez Linares / Eric Jiménez / Erik / Eric: drums
- Alonso Díaz / Alonso: keyboards, guitars
- Miguel López / Miguel: bass

== Discography ==
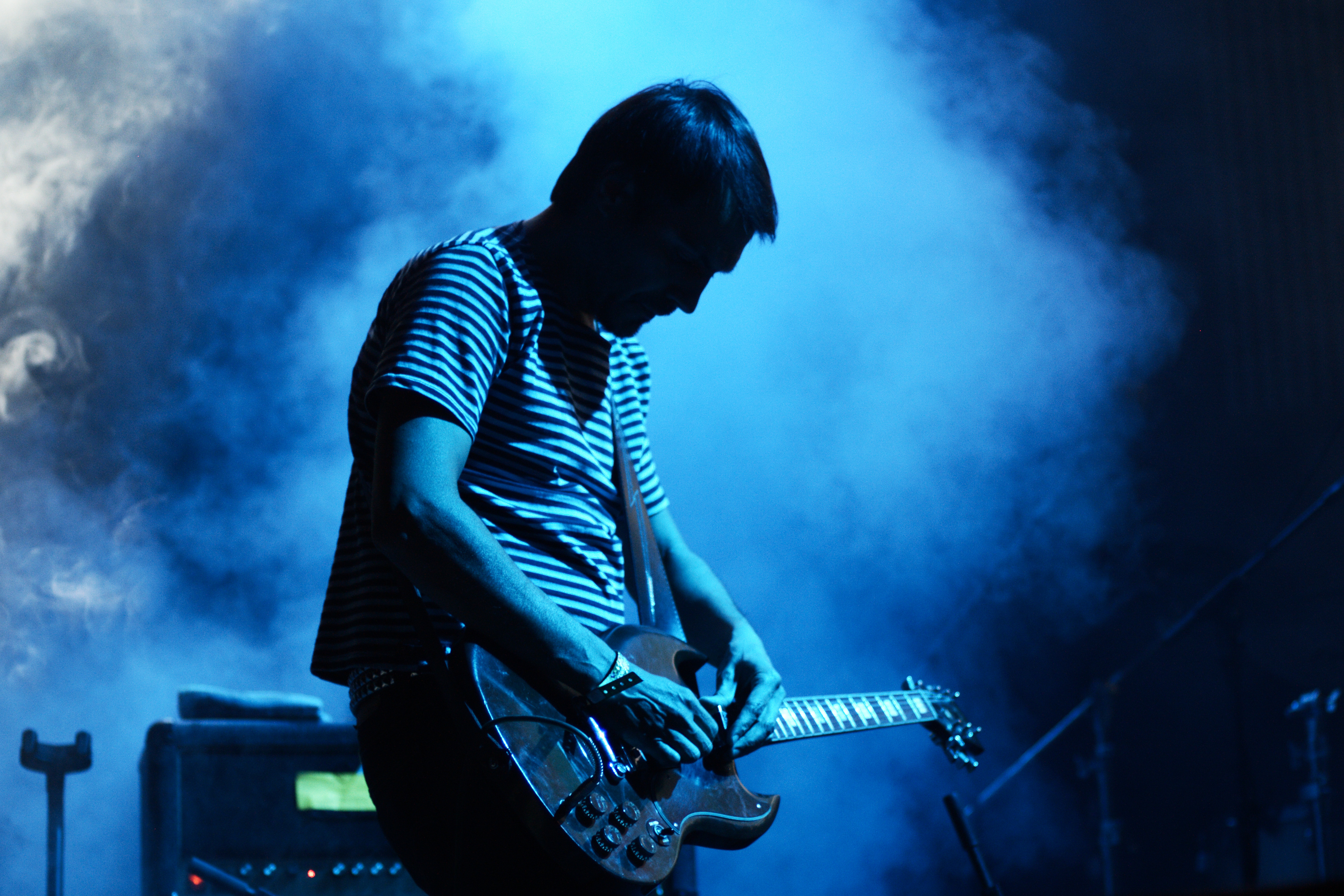
Los Planetas in 2010.

=== Albums ===
1. Super 8 (1994 RCA-BMG Ariola)
2. Pop (1996 RCA-BMG Ariola)
3. Una Semana en el Motor de un Autobús (1998 RCA-BMG Music Spain)
4. Canciones para una orquesta química (compilation, May 1999 RCA-BMG Music Spain)
5. Unidad de desplazamiento (Sep 2000 RCA-BMG Music Spain)
6. Encuentros con entidades (2002 RCA-BMG Music Spain)
7. Los Planetas contra la la ley de la gravedad (Jul 2004 RCA-BMG Music Spain)
8. La leyenda del espacio (2007 RCA-Sony BMG)
9. Principios básicos de astronomía (compilation, Jul 2009 Octubre - Sony Music Entertainment)
10. Una ópera egipcia (2010 Octubre - Sony Music Entertainment)
11. Zona temporalmente autónoma (2017 El Ejército Rojo - El Volcán Música)
12. Las canciones del agua (2022 El Ejército Rojo)

=== Singles ===
1. Medusa EP (1993 vinyl / 1996 cd Elefant Records)
2. Qué puedo hacer (1994 RCA-BMG Ariola)
3. Brigitte (1994 RCA-BMG Ariola)
4. Nuevas sensaciones EP (1995 RCA-BMG Ariola)
5. Himno Generacional No. 83 (1995 RCA-BMG Ariola)
6. David y Claudia (1996 RCA-BMG Ariola)
7. Punk (1996 RCA-BMG Ariola)
8. Segundo premio (1998 RCA-BMG Music Spain)
9. Cumpleaños total (1998 RCA-BMG Music Spain)
10. La playa (1998 RCA-BMG Music Spain)
11. ¡Dios existe! El rollo mesiánico de Los Planetas EP (1999 RCA-BMG Music Spain)
12. Vas a verme por la tele (May 2000 RCA-BMG Music Spain)
13. Un buen día (Aug 2000 RCA-BMG Music Spain)
14. Santos que yo te pinte (Feb 2001 RCA-BMG Music Spain)
15. Maniobra de evasión (2001 RCA-BMG Music Spain)
16. Corrientes circulares en el tiempo (2002 RCA-BMG Music Spain)
17. Pesadilla en el parque de atracciones (2002 RCA-BMG Music Spain)
18. El espíritu de la Navidad (2002 RCA-BMG Music Spain)
19. El artista madridista (2003 RCA-BMG Music Spain)
20. Los Planetas se disuelven EP (2003 Cáñamo / RCA-BMG Music Spain)
21. Y además es impossible (2004 RCA-BMG Music Spain)
22. No ardieras (2004 RCA-BMG Music Spain)
23. Alegrías del incendio (Mar 2007 RCA-Sony BMG)
24. Soy un pobre granaíno (colombiana) (2009, Octubre - Sony Music Entertainment) (only digital download)
25. Cuatro palos EP (2009 Octubre - Sony Music Entertainment)
26. No sé cómo te atreves (2010, Octubre - Sony Music Entertainment) (only digital download)
27. Dobles fatigas (2015, El Segell del Primavera)
28. Espíritu olímpico (2017, El Ejército Rojo)
29. Islamabad (2017, El Ejército Rojo)
30. Hierro y níquel 18 (2018, El Ejército Rojo)
31. Spotify Live (2018, El Ejército Rojo - Spotify)
32. Ijtihad (2018, El Ejército Rojo - El Volcán Música)
33. Santos que yo te pinte (en directo) (2019, El Ejército Rojo)
34. Eterna Lucha (Himno para el ascenso del Granada) (2019, El Ejército Rojo) (digital, featuring Lori Meyers, Grupo de Expertos Solynieve, Niño de Elche and Apartamentos Acapulco)
35. La nueva normalidad (2020, El Ejército Rojo)
36. Navidad en reserva (2020, El Ejército Rojo) (digital)
37. El negacionista (2021, El Ejército Rojo)
38. El rey de España (2021, El Ejército Rojo)
39. El antiplanetismo (2021, El Ejército Rojo)
40. Alegrías de Graná (2021, El Ejército Rojo)
41. Se quiere venir (2022, El Ejército Rojo)
42. Dos cruces (2026, El Ejército Rojo)

=== Compilation Appearances ===
1. Screamin' & Shoutin' 2. A Live Compilation: "Where's Bill Grundy Now?" (Television Personalities cover) (1993 Subterfuge Records)
2. Navidades Furiosas: "Canción de Navidad" (1993 La Fábrica Magnética)
3. Gimme More of That Sound: "Where's Bill Grundy Now?" (Television Personalities cover) (1994 Spiral)
4. A Tribute To Felt: "Apple Boutique" (Felt cover) (1994 Elefant Records)
5. Warsaw: Un Homenaje a Joy Division: "Disorder" (Joy Division cover) (1995 El Colectivo Karma, now Green Ufos)
6. Maraworld 1.0: "Doctor Osmond (Para Remontarte Angélico)" (1996 Sala Maravillas)
7. 21 Inéditos y Exclusivos: "Todos los Periódicos Mienten" (Una Semana en el Motor de un Autobús' outtake) (2002 Rockdelux magazine)
8. Un Soplo En El Corazón. Homenaje A Family: "El Mapa" (Family cover) (2003 Rockdelux)
9. Bambino, Por Ti y Por Nosotros: "Podría Volver" (Bambino cover) (2004 RCA-BMG Music Spain)
10. Viaje alrededor de Carlos Berlanga: "El verano más triste" (Carlos Berlanga cover) (El Volcán Música, 2010)
11. El alpinista de los sueños: Homenaje a Antonio Vega: "Quiero estar mejor" (Nacha Pop cover)(Universal, 2010)
12. PSM Festival: "Tormenta en la mañana de la vida" (La Buena Vida cover) (Rockdelux 2012)
13. El ombligo del mundo: "La torre de la vela" (091 cover) (Fundación Escuela de Solidaridad 2022)

=== Vinyl EPs / Singles ===
1. Medusa (1993 Elefant Records)
2. Nuevas sensaciones (1995 Subterfuge Records)
3. Himno generacional No. 83 (1996 Subterfuge Records. Coleccionistas "Mil copias")
4. David y Claudia (1996 Subterfuge Records. Coleccionistas "Mil copias")
5. Punk (1996 Subterfuge Records)
6. Su mapamundi, gracias (1997 Acuarela; split single with Sr. Chinarro)
7. Cuatro palos EP (2010 Octubre - Sony Music Entertainment)
8. Dobles fatigas (2015, El Segell del Primavera)
9. Espíritu olímpico (2017)
10. Islamabad (2017 Acuarela; split single with Yung Beef)
11. Hierro y níquel 18 (2018 El Ejército Rojo)
12. Ijtihad (2018 El Ejército Rojo)
13. Santos que yo te pinte (en directo) (2019 El Ejército Rojo)
14. La nueva normalidad (2021, El Ejército Rojo)
15. El rey de España (2021, El Ejército Rojo)
16. El antiplanetismo (2021, El Ejército Rojo)
17. Se quiere venir (2022, El Ejército Rojo)
18. Dos cruces (2026, El Ejército Rojo)
