= Zahara (Spanish musician) =

Spanish singer-songwriter

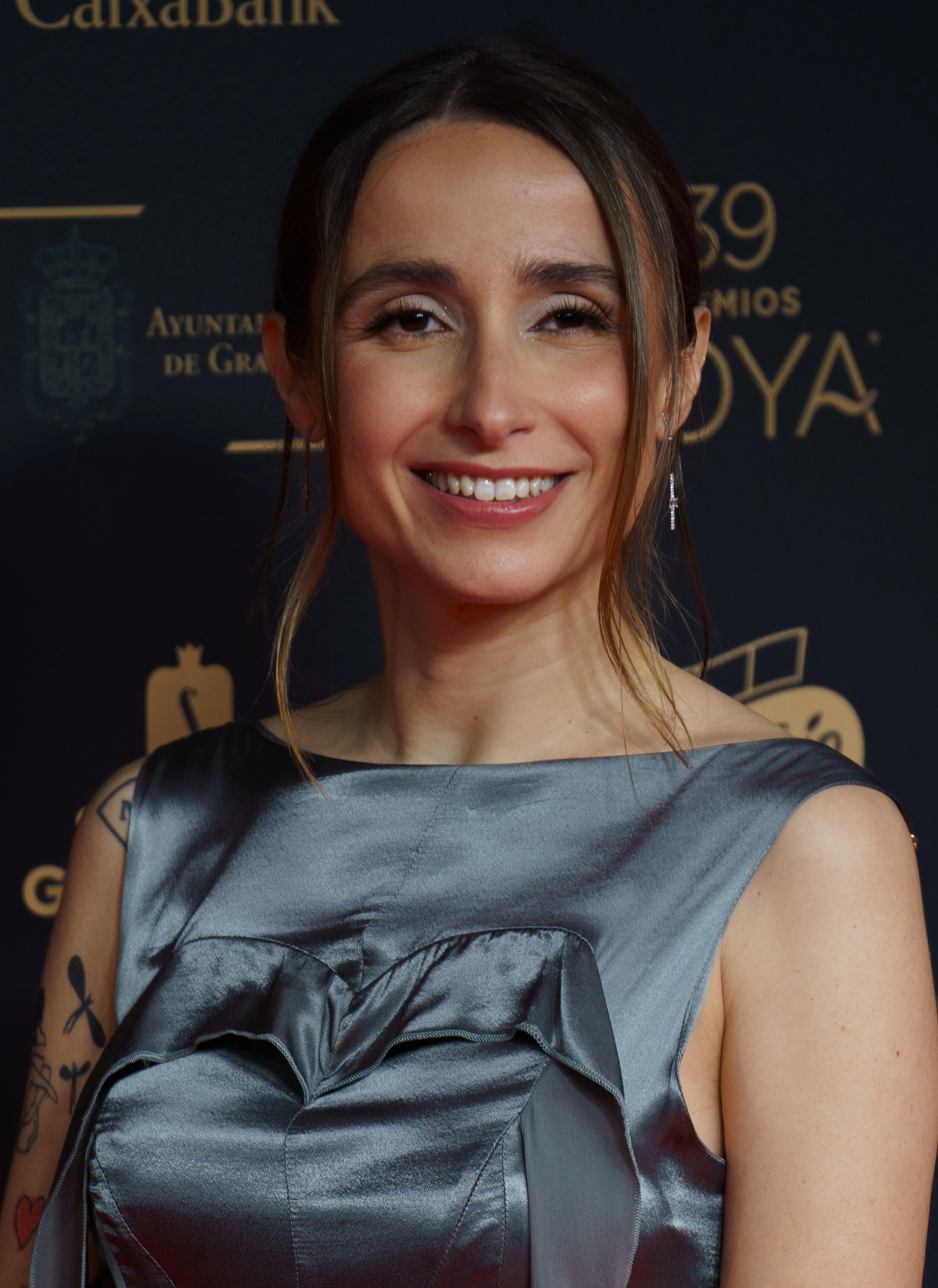

Background information
- Born: María Zahara Gordillo Campos; 10 August 1983 (age 42); Úbeda, Jaén, Spain
- Occupation: Singer-songwriter
- Instruments: Vocals, Guitar
- Years active: 2005–present
- Labels: Universal Music Group (2005–2011)
- Website: www.laparejatoxica.com www.zaharamania.net (in Spanish)

María Zahara Gordillo Campos (born 10 September 1983), better known simply as Zahara, is a Spanish singer-songwriter.

== Biography and education ==
Zahara wrote her first song when she was fifteen years old, "Una Palabra" (One Word). Zahara attended the Colegio Público Sebastián de Córdoba, and she studied her music at the Conservatorio de Música in Ubeda. She spent half a semester at the Instituto Francisco. For her tertiary education, she studied in, and graduated from, the Magisterio Musical between Almería and Granada.

In March, Zahara released a single "Oh, salvaje" (English: O, Savage), which would appear on her fourth studio album, Santa (2015). It was written and produced by Zahara and Sergio Sastre. The single has received national acclaim from music critics who encouraged its sound as a great pop ballad which is fresh and different to what the singer usually composes.

== Studio albums ==
- Día 913 (Day 913) (2005)
- La Fabulosa Historia De... (The Fabulous History Of...) (2009)
- La Pareja Tóxica (The Toxic Couple) (2011)
- Santa (Saint) (2015)
- Astronauta (Astronaut) (2018)
- Alienígena (Alien) (2019)
- Puta (Whore) (2021)
- REPUTA (2022)
- Lento Ternura (2025)

=== Recopilatorios ===
- Bestiario 1 (2016)
- MADRE (2022)

== Singles ==
- Merezco (I Deserve) (2009)
- Con Las Ganas (Left Wanting) (2010)
- Lucha De Gigantes (Fight of Giants) with Love of Lesbian (2010)
- Pregúntale Al Polvo (Ask The Dust) (2011)
- Leñador y La Mujer América (Lumberjack And The American Woman) (2011)
- El Lugar Donde Viene a Morir El Amor (The Place Where Love Comes To Die) (2012)
- Crash (2015)
- El Frío (The cold) (2015)
- Hoy La Bestia Cena en Casa (2018)
- Guerra Fría (2018)
- El Fango (2018)
- Soy un aeropuerto (2020)
- MARICHANE (2021)
- canción de muerte y salvación (2021)
- TAYLOR (2021)
- berlin U5 (2021)
- DOLORES (2021)
- Stranger Things (2021)
- Delirios (2022)
- la hostia de dios (2022)
- berlin U5 (REPUTA) (with Alizzz) (2022)
- RAMONA (REPUTA) (with Pretty Pretty 2000) (2022)
- MERICHANE (REPUTA) (with shego) (2022)
- médula (REPUTA) (with La Oreja De Van Gogh) (2022)
- ESTO NO ES UNA CANCIÓN POLÍTICA (2023)
- Liturgia (with Samantha Hudson) (2024)
- Yo solo quería escribir una canción de amor (2024)
- Tus michis (2024)
- Quién dijo (2025)
- Demasiadas canciones (2025)
