= Resurrection Fest =

Annual Spanish rock festival

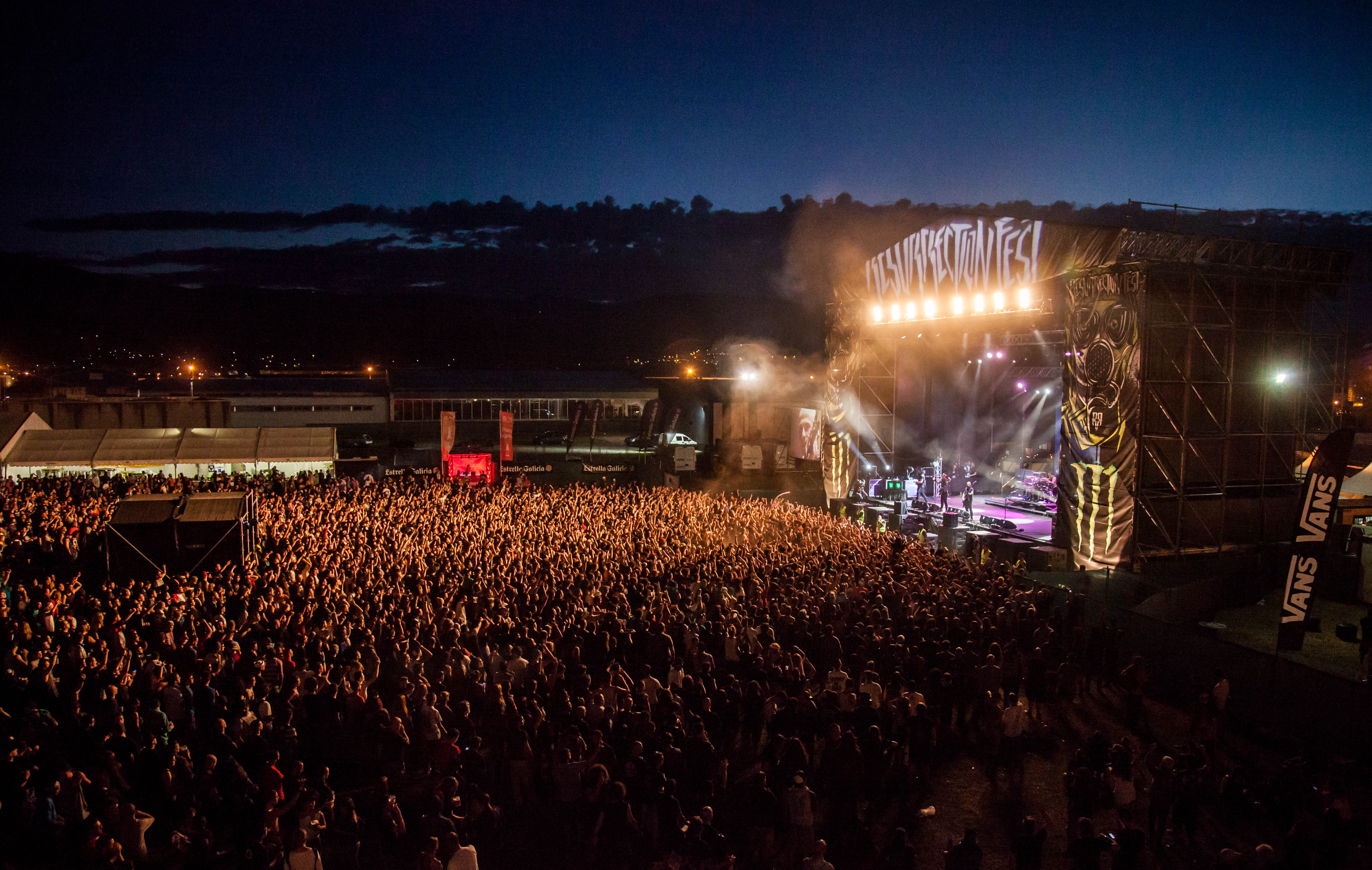
- Trivium at Resurrection Fest 2013
- Genre: Heavy metal, hardcore punk, punk rock
- Dates: July, August
- Locations: Viveiro, Spain
- Years active: 2006–present
- Founders: O.N.P. Producciones
- Website: www.resurrection-fest.com

Resurrection Fest is a rock music festival that takes place in Viveiro, region of Lugo, Spain. This festival has been held annually since 2006 during July or early August and features mainly heavy metal, hardcore punk and punk rock bands. Since its emergence it has become one of the most important music festivals in Spain due to its genre specialization. In 2013 edition set its record of 33,000 attendees, with a measured socio-economic impact of 3.3 million euros in the region. In 2015, these numbers increased to more than 54,500 people and a 6.15-million euros impact.

Along its history, more than 200 bands have performed, including world-wide important groups such as Iron Maiden, Korn, Motörhead, Kiss, Scorpions, Rammstein, Slipknot, In Flames, Black Label Society, Megadeth, Anthrax, Slayer, Cannibal Corpse, Sabaton, NOFX, Lamb of God, Refused, Testament, Five Finger Death Punch, Trivium, Down, Crowbar, Sick of It All, Bad Religion, Bullet for My Valentine, Heaven Shall Burn, Pennywise, Hatebreed, At the Gates, Dead Kennedys, Exodus, and Black Flag.

== History ==
The festival was first held in August 2006 under the name of Viveiro Summer Fest, and admission was free thanks to local government. Two days before the event, its headliner, Sick of It All, had to cancel its show because of a sudden illness of one of their members. Besides the lack of support after this accident, it was postponed until November of the same year being called Resurrection Fest and it enjoyed great success.

Nowadays it is a four-day festival (3-days since 2010, 4-days since 2015), the number of performances has reached 78 in 2015, and every year the attendance record is broken with the current one of 54,500 people in 2015, coming mostly from all over Spain. Other countries like Portugal or France are increasingly represented.

== Line-ups ==
Confirmed bands during the different editions of the festival:

=== 2006 ===
Dates: 18 November

- Sick of It All
- Walls of Jericho
- Twenty Fighters
- Anal Hard
- Ofensiva
- The Band Apart
- Sound of Silence

=== 2007 ===
Dates: 17 and 18 August

- Napalm Death
- Caliban
- Madball
- Devil in Me
- The Awake
- Rain Is Art
- Shattered Dreams
- Ignite
- Backfire
- Angel Crew
- Grankapo
- Twenty Fighters
- Against the Spirits
- The Black Panthys Party

=== 2008 ===
Dates: 1 and 2 August

- Misfits
- Madball
- Manu Chao
- Agnostic Front
- Soziedad Alkoholika
- Bane
- Sun Eats Hours
- All Against the World
- Oppugno
- Anger Second
- Migraine
- Voodoo Glow Skulls
- Unearth
- No Fun at All
- Heaven Shall Burn
- Death by Stereo
- No Turning Back
- Habeas Corpus
- Anal Hard
- Shoot Again
- Confront Hate

=== 2009 ===
Dates: 31 July and 1 August

- Toy Dolls
- Mad Caddies
- Ratos de Porão
- Napalm Death
- Madball
- Strike Anywhere
- H_{2}O
- Walls of Jericho
- Hazen Street
- Ignite
- Black Friday 29
- Berri Txarrak
- Not Available
- Maroon
- Rain Is Art
- The Red Chord
- The Eyes
- Knuckledust
- Overcome
- L'Espirit du Clan
- For the Glory
- Read My Lips
- Adrenalized
- By the Face
- No Humano

=== 2010 ===
Dates: 29, 30 and 31 July

- Down
- Sick of It All
- No Use for a Name
- Lagwagon
- Enter Shikari
- Converge
- Gallows
- Heaven Shall Burn
- Municipal Waste
- Catch 22
- Escuela de Odio
- Black Friday 29
- Useless ID
- Nasty
- Angelus Apatrida
- Onesta
- Aphonnic
- Vortice
- First Blood
- Kylesa
- Polar Bear Club
- No Turning Back
- Cro-Mags
- Raised Fist
- The Ghost of a Thousand
- Twenty Inch Burial
- Sound of Silence
- For the Glory
- Nunnery
- Shoot Again
- Fresh Trash
- Truth Through Fight

=== 2011 ===
Dates: 28, 29 and 30 July

- Bring Me the Horizon
- Pennywise
- Bullet for My Valentine
- Gorilla Biscuits
- Comeback Kid
- CIV
- Kvelertak
- Meshuggah
- Strife
- The Real McKenzies
- The Adicts
- The Bouncing Souls
- Architects
- A Wilhelm Scream
- Your Demise
- Misconduct
- Authority Zero
- Angelus Apatrida
- Do or Die
- More Than Life
- Freygolo
- Anal Hard
- Avenues and Silhouettes
- Vita Imana
- Legacy of Brutality
- Hills Have Eyes
- Tragic Vision
- Death Will Come
- Sworn Enemy
- Sylosis
- Six ft Dich
- Nothink
- Switchtense
- Alea Jacta Est
- Dawn of the Maya
- Bastards on Parade
- Vera Cruz
- This Drama
- Toundra
- Cohen
- Echovolt
- Cuernos de Chivo
- For Ophelia's Death

=== 2012 ===
Dates: 2, 3 and 4 August

- At the Gates
- Dead Kennedys
- Hatebreed
- Descendents
- Suicidal Tendencies
- Converge
- Agnostic Front
- Nasum
- Anti-Flag
- Good Riddance
- Glassjaw
- Against Me!
- Soziedad Alkoholika
- The Black Dahlia Murder
- Berri Txarrak
- Angelus Apatrida
- Suicide Silence
- Municipal Waste
- Unearth
- MxPx AllStar
- H_{2}O
- Wisdom in Chains
- Reel Big Fish
- Pianos Become the Teeth
- Set Your Goals
- This Is Hell
- Adrift
- Skarhead
- Deez Nuts
- Here Comes the Kraken
- The Eyes
- G.A.S. Drummers
- Give Em Blood
- Primitive
- Tim Vantol
- Back to 1984
- Proud'Z
- Grankapo
- Crisix
- Nasty Mondays
- Ninja Kore

=== 2013 ===
Dates: 1, 2 and 3 August

- Slayer
- Bad Religion
- Lamb of God
- Killswitch Engage
- Black Flag
- Millencolin
- Trivium
- Biohazard
- Exodus
- Comeback Kid
- Jello Biafra
- Madball
- The Exploited
- Your Demise
- Sylosis
- I Killed the Prom Queen
- Street Dogs
- The Casualties
- Evergreen Terrace
- Integrity
- Avulsed
- Belvedere
- The Flatliners
- Lendakaris Muertos
- Dia De Los Muertos
- Brutality Will Prevail
- Toundra
- No Turning Back
- Crisix
- Rise of the Northstar
- Vita Imana
- Escuela de Odio
- Noctem
- Switchtense
- Mostomalta
- The Amsterdam Redlight District
- Rise to Fall
- For the Glory
- Devil in Me
- Possession
- Bastards on Parade
- Dawn of the Maya
- Thirteen Bleed Promises
- Blowfuse
- Horn of the Rhino
- Violent Eve
- We Ride
- A New Heaven Arise
- Inordem
- Mutant Squad
- Against the Waves
- Exodia
- Noiseast
- Rancis
- Display of Power
- Amenaza de Muerte
- 1906
- CVLT
- Nao
- Ånima
- Barbarian Prophecies
- Wolves Are Coming
- Trashnos
- Blast Off
- Oddy Lane

=== 2015 ===
Dates: 15, 16, 17 and 18 July

- Biohazard
- Pro-Pain
- The Decline
- Killus
- Bastards on Parade
- Mutant Squad (few weeks after they switch their name to "Mutant")
- Defclones (Spanish tribute to Deftones)
- Refused
- Black Label Society
- Soulfly
- Berri Txarrak
- Devil Sold His Soul
- Heart of a Coward
- Aphonnic
- Cannibal Corpse
- Suicide Silence
- Decapitated
- Gama Bomb
- Betraying the Martyrs
- The Algorithm
- Misanthrope
- Jardin de la Croix
- Brothers Till We Die
- Comeback Kid
- Toundra
- Defeater
- Oathbreaker
- Nasty
- Landscapes
- Adrenalized
- Abaixo Cu Sistema (Portuguese tribute to System of a Down)

- Motörhead
- In Flames
- Backyard Babies
- Children of Bodom
- Kadavar
- Iron Reagan
- Get Dead
- D.R.I.
- The Exploited
- Nuclear Assault
- Toxic Holocaust
- Dr. Living Dead!
- Anestesia
- Dagoba
- Blaze Out (twice; first time playing their original stuff on 17 July)
- Terror
- 7 Seconds
- Deez Nuts
- Anti-Nowhere League
- Expire
- Risk It!
- Intolerance
- The Everlongs (Spanish tribute to Foo Fighters)

- Korn
- Fear Factory
- Danko Jones
- Heaven Shall Burn
- Skindred
- Carnifex
- Monuments
- Behemoth
- Moonspell
- Dark Funeral
- Ne Obliviscaris
- Syberia
- Der Weg einer Freiheit
- In Mute
- Borderlands
- Satanic Surfers
- Strung Out
- Dog Eat Dog
- Merauder
- No Turning Back
- Dawn of the Maya
- Providence
- Blaze Out (twice; second time playing Metallica and Iron Maiden songs on 18 July)

=== 2016 ===
Dates: 6, 7, 8, and 9 July

Venue: Campo de fútbol Celeiro, Viveiro

Wednesday, July 6, 2016

- Electric Callboy
- For the Glory
- Hyde Abbey
- Narco
- Siberian Meat Grinder
- Skindred
- Strikeback

Thursday, July 7, 2016

- Bad Religion
- Bring Me the Horizon
- Brujería
- Crisix
- Fleshgod Apocalypse
- H_{2}O
- Implore
- Minor Empires
- Norma Jean
- Persefone
- Rotting Christ
- Soldier
- Stick to Your Guns
- TesseracT
- The Casualties
- Tierra Hostil
- Viva Belgrado
- Volbeat
- Walls of Jericho
- While She Sleeps
- Wormed

Friday, July 8, 2016

- Abaixo Cu Sistema
- Angel Crew
- Angelus Apatrida
- Arkangel
- Battlecross
- Being as an Ocean
- Dark Tranquillity
- Desakato
- Frank Carter & The Rattlesnakes
- Gojira
- Hamlet
- Hatebreed
- In Mute
- Madball
- Never Draw Back
- Protest the Hero
- Rise of the Northstar
- Sinistro
- The Offspring
- Thirteen Bled Promises
- Turisas

Saturday, July 9, 2016

- Abbath
- Bullet for My Valentine
- Cannibal Grandpa
- Destruction
- Enslaved
- Entombed A.D.
- Graveyard
- Iron Maiden
- Municipal Waste
- Nashville Pussy
- No Fun at All
- Obsidian Kingdom
- Shining
- The Goddamn Gallows
- The Raven Age
- The Real McKenzies
- The Shrine
- The Wild Lies
- Thy Art Is Murder
- True Mountains
- Uncle Acid & the deadbeats

=== 2019 ===
Dates: 4, 5 and 6 July

Thursday July 4
Monster Energy Main Stage	Ritual Stage	Chaos Stage	Desert Stage
Slayer; Parkway Drive; Gojira; Crystal Lake; Cane Hill; Trallery	Batushka; Leo Jiménez; Toundra; Altarage; Meltdown	The Adicts; Terror; Misconduct; Higher Power; Kitai	Brant Bjork; Cro! Caboverde; Bones of Minerva; Electric Monolith

Friday July 5
Monster Energy Main Stage	Ritual Stage	Chaos Stage	Desert Stage
Slipknot; Arch Enemy; Trivium; While She Sleeps; Brothers Till We Die; Misvia	Cradle Of Filth; Avatar; Serrabulho; Childrain; Megara	Converge; Millencolin; Birds in Row; Mute	Radio Moscow; The Ocean; The Black Wizards; Wet Cactus; Santa Rostro

Saturday July 6
Monster Energy Main Stage	Ritual Stage	Chaos Stage	Desert Stage
King Diamond; Within Temptation; Lamb Of God; Testament; Alien Weaponry; Misvia	Cult Of Luna; Berri Txarrak; Vhäldemar; Strikeback; Talesien	Nasty; Analepsy; Brutality Will Prevail; Eraso! Close To The Sky; Morgen	Miss Lava; Colour Haze; Troubled Horse; Cobra; Atavismo; Cathexia; Syberia

=== 2021 (Limited Edition) ===
Dates: 26, 27 and 28 August

Thursday, 26 August 2021

- Kreator
- Angelus Apatrida
- Bala
- Viva Belgrado
- Aphonnic

Friday, 27 August 2021

- Eluveitie
- Jinjer
- Crisix
- The Ocean Collective
- Bellako

Saturday, 28 August 2021

- While She Sleeps
- Destruction
- Landmvrks
- Teksuo
- True Mountains

=== 2022 ===
Dates: 29 and 30 June, 1, 2 and 3 July

Wednesday 29 June
Warm Up

Deftones
Bullet for My Valentine
Alien Weaponry
Bleed from Within
Serrabulho
Onza
Bolu2 Death
Banderanegra DJs

Thursday 30 June
Main Stage	Ritual Stage	Chaos Stage	Desert Stage
Judas Priest; Opeth; Sepultura; Hamlet; Vita Imana	Dark Funeral; Vomitory; Benighted; Numen; Blaze Out; Lèpoka; Arsian	Crim; Morning Again; Misconduct; True Mountains; Bonecarver; Wasted Wiltons; Blaze The Trail	Me and that Man; Wiegedood; Adrift; Chris Masuak & the Viveiro Wave Riders Association; Green Desert Water; Fuzz Forward; Me Fritos and the Gimme Cheetos

Friday 1 July
Main Stage	Ritual Stage	Chaos Stage	Desert Stage
Sabaton; Rise Against; Jinjer; Caliban; Our Hollow, Our Home; Free City	Ill Niño; Decapitated; Hangman's Chair; The Raven Age; Thirteen Bled Promises; Graveyard	Lionheart; Bourbon Kings; Kids of Rage; Aphonnic; Machina; Turbokraks; Six Burning Knives	Celeste; El Altar del Holocausto; Skontra; Totengott; Dena; Seek 'Em All

Saturday 2 July
Main Stage	Ritual Stage	Chaos Stage	Desert Stage
Gojira; Mastodon; Crossfaith; Beyond the Black; Dagoba; Skunk D.F.	Bloodbath; Master Boot Record; Kontrust; Gaerea; Sound of Silence; Eon; Leaving Mars	Malevolence; Moscow Death Brigade; Blowfuse; Svalbard; The Broken Horizon; Grippers; We Exist Even Dead	Toundra; Planet of Zeus; The Picturebooks; Willis Drummond; Sharon Stoner; Acidproyect; Closing the Earth; Bulls on Parade

Sunday 3 July
Main Stage	Ritual Stage	Chaos Stage	Desert Stage
Bring Me the Horizon; Heaven Shall Burn; Stick to Your Guns; Electric Callboy; Deadly Apples	Angelus Apatrida; Enforced; Infected Rain; Bloodhunter; Golpe Radikal; Mosh; Mind Driller	Knocked Loose; Doyle; Belvedere; Ruxe Ruxe; Grima; Synlakross	Phil Campbell and the Bastard Sons; My Sleeping Karma; Ciclonautas; Frutería Toñi; The Dry Mouths; Elephant Riders; Kaleikia

== See also ==
- Viveiro
