= Bilbao BBK Live =

Annual music festival in Spain

- Poster for 2012 edition of poster
- Genre: Rock; pop; alternative rock; hard rock; indie; electronic
- Dates: 12–14 July
- Locations: Kobetamendi; Bilbao, Spain
- Years active: 2006–present
- Founders: Basque Government; Last Tour International
- Organizer: Last Tour Concerts
- Website: bilbaobbklive.com

Bilbao BBK Live is a rock and pop music festival that takes place annually in the city of Bilbao, Spain. Since its beginnings, the festival is held in its entirety on a special complex built specifically for the event on the slopes of Mount Cobetas, located southwest of the city.

The first edition was organized by Basque musical promoter Last Tour International and sponsored by the Bilbao City Council in the year 2006 under the name Bilbao Live Festival. Since the following year, the festival has been sponsored by local savings bank Bilbao Bizkaia Kutxa, who gave it its current name. The festival is the first of its kind and size to happen in the region. In the 2011 edition, the festival exceeded 100,000 visitors for the first time, doubling the 2006 attendance. The 2012 event was reported to left an economical impact estimated in over 17.5 million euros in the city.

The festival was nominated for "Best Foreign Festival" at the UK Festival Awards in 2010 and 2011, and for "Best Medium-Sized European Festival" at the European Festivals Awards three consecutive times in 2009–2011.

== History ==
=== Organization and first edition ===
After an unsuccessful attempt to establish a street circuit in the city for the Formula Renault 3.5 in July 2005, the city Government decided to fill in the summer events calendar with an open-air music festival. In early 2006, it approached local musical promoter Last Tour International, responsible for the organization of the Azkena Rock Festival, celebrated in nearby Vitoria-Gasteiz since 2002. The newborn festival received the name of Bilbao Live Festival, and had a budget of 4.2 million euros. The newly developed area in mount Cobetas was chosen as the location, which included two main stages for the rock acts, two electronic music tents, one pop music tent, and several bars and shops. Over 40 national and international bands participated in the first edition, celebrated during three days between 13 and 15 July 2006. The headliners included American hard rock band Guns N' Roses, British bands Placebo and Pretenders, and Argentinians Andrés Calamaro and Ariel Roth, former members of rock band Los Rodríguez.

Over 51,000 people attended this first edition, and was considered a "success". LTI representative, Alfonso Santiago praised the organization and the music acts, and defined the festival as a "good starting point". The festival was well received by critics, the authorities, and the general public, and a second edition for the next year was confirmed on 28 July 2006, with the possibility of making it a "permanent musical event" of the city's cultural offer.

=== BBK sponsorship and consolidation ===
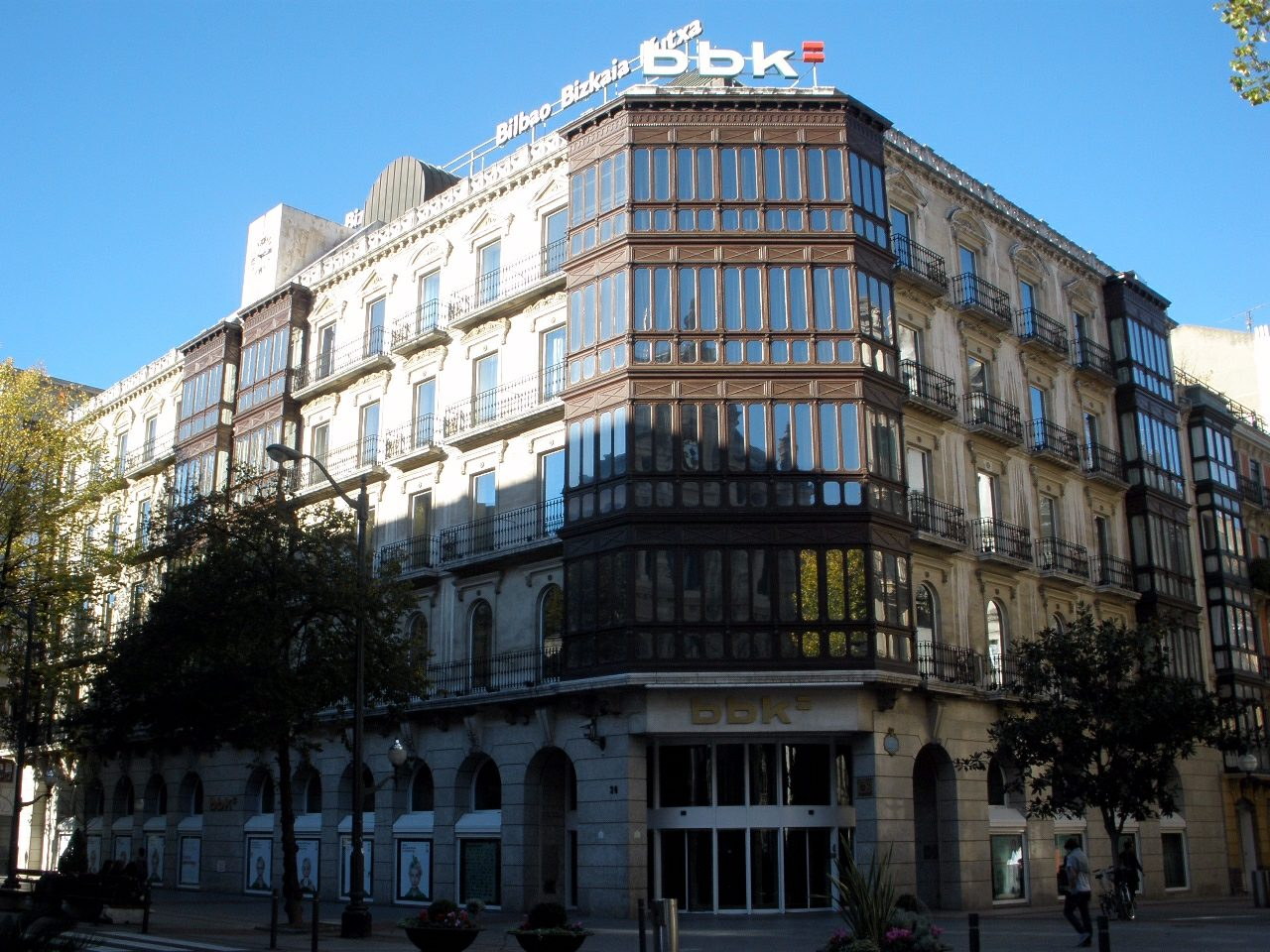
BBK, the main sponsor since 2007.

In early 2007, local savings bank Bilbao Bizkaia Kutxa decided to become an official sponsor for the festival, as part of the actions for its 100th anniversary celebration campaign. As a result, the festival's name was changed to Bilbao BBK Live. Unlike other sponsorship renamings, where the sponsor's name is usually dropped in an informal context, this festival is commonly referred to as "the BBK Live" or simply "the BBK". The second edition enjoyed a "significant budget rise", and the area designated for the stages and camping was also increased from 70,000 to 110,000 m^{2}. The 2007 edition was also the first (and currently only) to be celebrated in June, a decision took based on the "European summer festival calendar". An extra date was also added, spanning two weekends, 21-22 and 28–29 June. American bands Red Hot Chili Peppers, Metallica, Incubus, New York Dolls, My Chemical Romance, and British heavy metal band Iron Maiden were among the international headliners for this edition, meanwhile local rock band Fito & Fitipaldis stood out among Spanish acts, and received the largest audience of the event. Over 95,000 people attended the event, and produced an economical impact estimated in 13 million euros.

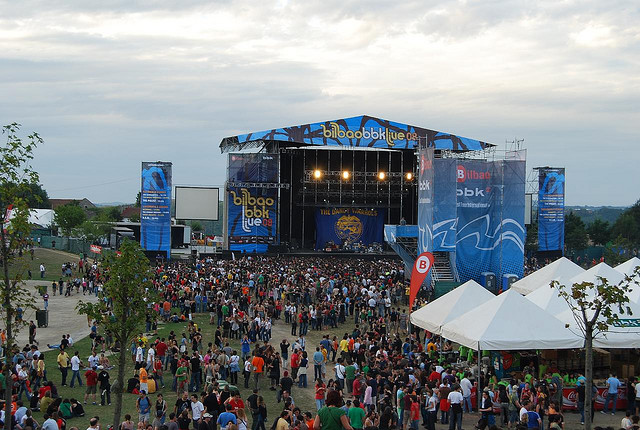
The main stage for the 2008 edition.

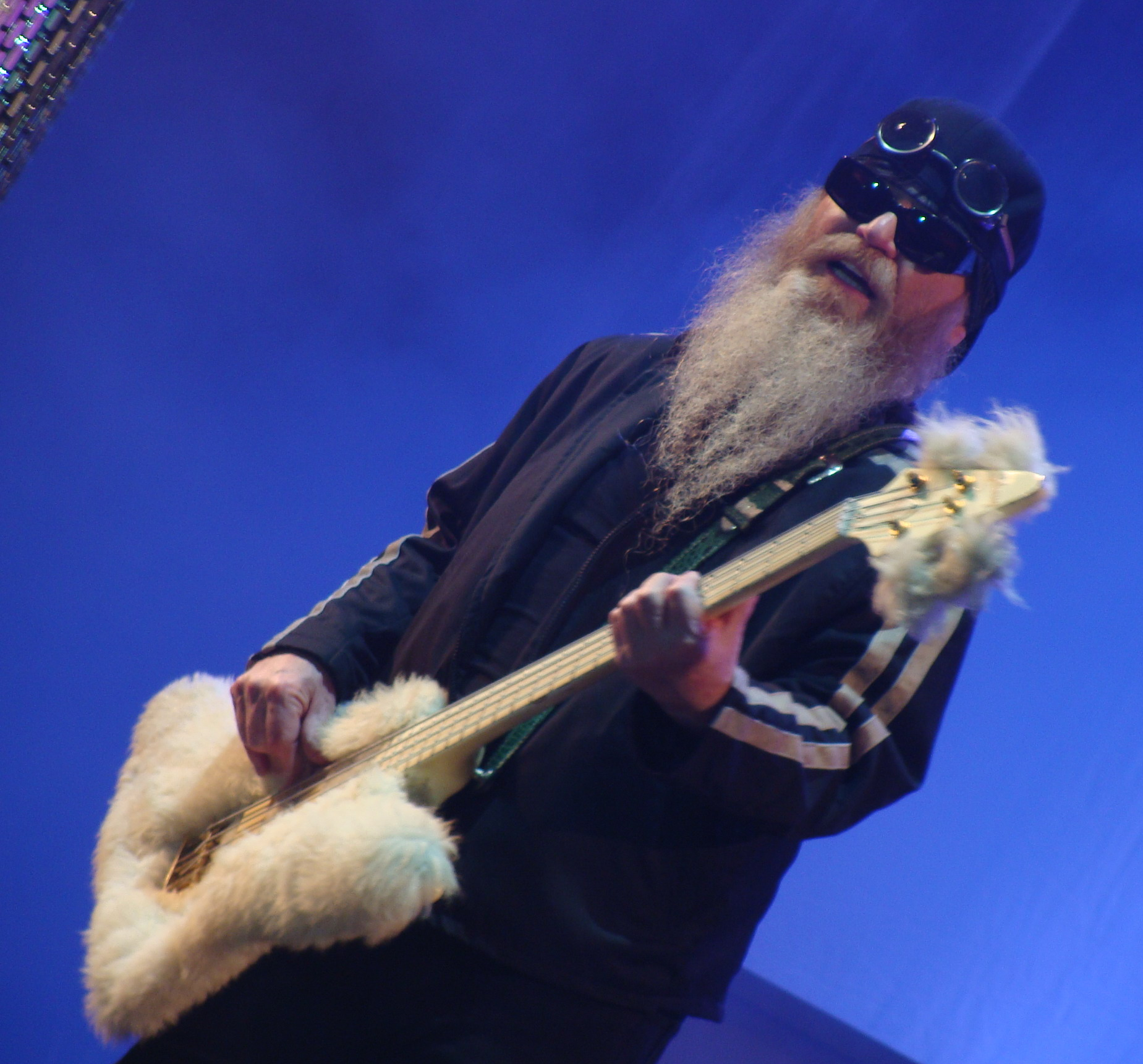
Dusty Hill in the 2008 edition.

For the 2008 edition, the festival moved back to its original dates in the first weekend of July and a three-day programme. This edition was headlined by American acts R.E.M., Lenny Kravitz, ZZ Top, and British bands The Police, The Prodigy, and Madness. This year saw the introduction of a new festival in the city; Kobetasonik was focused in heavy metal music, was headlined by Kiss and Judas Priest, and was held two weeks before BBK Live in the same venue at mount Cobetas. Bilbao BBK Live 08 was attended by a little less than 80,000 people, well below the expected 95,000. Rain and difficult access to the site, available only through shuttle buses provided by a private party instead of the city's public buses as in past editions, were seen as factors for the decrease in attendance. However, the edition was still considered a success, and despite a project of moving the festival to a new location at an abandoned amusement park in mount Artxanda, the organization decided to stick to Cobetas, and promised improvements in the area and services for 2009.

The fourth edition, held between 9–11 July 2009 suffered greatly from the financial crisis that struck Spain in that period. As a result, the line-up was considerately "less commercial", as defined by the organization. Headliners included Depeche Mode, Jane's Addiction, Kaiser Chiefs, Editors, and second-timers Placebo, among others. The festival received over 52,600 visitors, a "foreseen decrease", and although considered a "step back", the continuity of the festival was confirmed. This edition saw an increase of foreign visitors, a 5-point increase from the past edition, totaling 14,6%. Foreign attendees came principally from France and the United Kingdom. This was mainly due to a special offer aimed to anyone with a postal address outside of Spain, with a three-day ticket for £40, one third of the standard price.

== Lineups by year ==
=== 2006 ===
Number of visitors: 51.000

Stages
13 July	14 July	15 July
Ben Harper and the Innocent Criminals; The Cult; The Cardigans; Ladytron; Ojos de Brujo; Lori Meyers; Gatibu	Guns N' Roses; Deftones; Blue Öyster Cult; Fun Lovin' Criminals; Mando Diao; Heavy Trash; Hash	Placebo; Andrés Calamaro y Ariel Rot; Tricky; The Pretenders; Los Planetas; Rinôçérôse; El Inquilino Comunista; El Columpio Asesino; Zodiacs

Stages
13 July	14 July	15 July
Smoking Deluxx; Capri; Birdy; Sindikaat Djs; Carvalho Live; FC Kahuna; Alex Under & Paco Osuna	Iñigo Kriptonita; The Mfa Live; Matthew Dekay; Alexander Kowalski feat Khan live Robbie Rivera; Vitalic; Cristian Varela; Armin van Buuren; John Lord Fonda live Markus Schulz; Feliz Da Housecat	Donnacha costello Silicone Soul; Front 242; Oxia; Todd Terry; Rex The Dog; Derrick Carter; Der Dritte Raum; Francesco Farfa; Junkie XL

=== 2007 ===
Number of visitors: 94.712

Stages
21 June	22 June	28 June	29 June
Iron Maiden; Within Temptation; Mastodon; Juliette & The Licks; Stone Sour; Bloodsimple; Lauren Harris; Vhäldemar	Red Hot Chili Peppers; My Chemical Romance; Fishbone; Fermin Muguruza & afro-basque fire brigade Kula Shaker; Billy Talent; Berri Txarrak; One Direction Drive	Fito & Fitipaldis; New York Dolls; Maceo Parker; Los Ronaldos; Muchachito Bombo Infierno; I Love Ufo; The Pinker Tones; The Ellas; Nun	Metallica; Incubus; The (International) Noise Conspiracy; Bullet for My Valentine; Nebula; Zico Chain; Idi Bihotz; Biok; Laia

=== 2008 ===
Number of visitors: 79.810

Stages
4 July	5 July	6 July
The Police; The Dandy Warhols; The Charlatans; Morcheeba; The Raveonettes; The Gift; Fancy; Gari	R.E.M. Lenny Kravitz; The Prodigy; The Fratellis; The Sunday Drivers; The Pigeon Detectives; Krakovia; Dynamo	Madness; ZZ Top; Tequila; Riders on The Storm; The Blues Brothers Band; Quique González & La Aristocracia del Barrio

=== 2009 ===
Number of visitors: 52.663

Stages
9 July	10 July	11 July
Depeche Mode; Basement Jaxx; Editors; The Ting Tings; Vetusta Morla; The Gaslight Anthem; Motor; Lain	Jane's Addiction; Kaiser Chiefs; Echo and the Bunnymen; Dave Matthews Band; Chris Cornell; Babyshambles; Supergrass; El Columpio Asesino	Placebo; Primal Scream; Fischerspooner; Asian Dub Foundation; Baddies; The Phenomenal Handclap Band; Cycle; Expatriate; Ama Say

=== 2010 ===
Number of visitors: 76.579

Stages
8 July	9 July	10 July
Rammstein; Slayer; Skunk Anansie; Rise Against; Bullet for My Valentine; Anti-Flag; Volbeat; Rise to Fall	Pearl Jam; Alice in Chains; Paul Weller; Gogol Bordello; Coheed and Cambria; Biffy Clyro; Dropkick Murphys; Gómez; Wild Beasts; Cápsula	Faith No More; Manic Street Preachers; Jeff Tweedy; Jet; Feeder; Tsool; Los Campesinos! The Maccabees; Band of Skulls; Zain

=== 2011 ===
Number of visitors: 103.083

Stages
7 July	8 July	9 July
Coldplay; Blondie; Beady Eye; The Twilight Singers; Crystal Castles; Russian Red; Ken Zazpi; Neon Trees; Miss Caffeina; Sweet Oblivion; Mild; Oink! Oink! Djs	Suede; Kasabian; Kaiser Chiefs; Vetusta Morla !!! The Mars Volta; TV on the Radio; Noisettes; Zarama; CatPeople; Mamba Beat; Radiofunkens; The Zombie Kids; Montxo & Javi Green	The Black Crowes; Jack Johnson; The Chemical Brothers; 30 Seconds to Mars; M Clan; Les Savy Fav; Seasick Steve; Japanese Voyeurs; Enkore; Estereotypo; Smile; Le Noise; Independence Djs; Optigan1 Dj

=== 2012 ===
Number of visitors: 110.000

Stages
12 July	13 July	14 July
The Cure; Snow Patrol; Bloc Party; James Murphy; The Maccabees; Jon Spencer Blues Explosion; Pat Mahoney; Band of Skulls; Lori Meyers; The Gift; Ben Howard; Tribes; Young Guns; Belako; La Habitación Roja; McEnroe; Varry Brava; Elbis Reber; Ciudadano Kane; Montxo & Javi Green	Radiohead; The Kooks; Mumford & Sons; Vetusta Morla; Four Tet; Noah and the Whale; Warpaint; Zea Mays; We Are Augustines; Etienne de Crecy; Here We Go Magic; Zoé; Bigott; Triángulo de Amor Bizarro; Amós y LoSantos; Namek Planet; Victoria's Secret DJs; The Warriors DJs	Garbage; Keane; Glasvegas; Sum 41; The View; Eli "Paperboy" Reed; Corizonas; Enter Shikari; The Big Pink; The Inspector Cluzo & FB's Horns; PS I Love You; Pure Love; The Black Belle; Rubick; Supersubmarina; Onda Vaga; Lauroba; Dani Less & Oskar Destroy (Independence Club); Nasty Mondays

=== 2013 ===
Number of visitors: 105.000

Stages
11 July	12 July	13 July
Depeche Mode; Two Door Cinema Club; Editors; Biffy Clyro; Alt-J; Billy Talent; Charles Bradley & his extraordinaires Delorean; Toy; Edward Sharpe and the Magnetic Zeros; Miss Caffeina; L. A. Arcane Roots; Little Boots; Dj Amable; Banda de Turistas; Skasti y Javi Green & Montxo	Kings of Leon; PiL; The Vaccines; Klaxons; Mark Lanegan Band; 2ManyDJs; Benjamin Biolay with special guest Carl Barat; Standstill presenta Cénit; Gary Clark Jr. Johnny Borrell & Zazou; Spector; Birdy Nam Nam; Fuel Fandango; Los Zigarros; Ciudadano Kane; The Warriors DJs; Herri Oihua; Ainara LeGardon y The home phonema	Green Day; Vampire Weekend; Fatboy Slim; The Hives; Fermin Muguruza Kontrakantxa; White Denim; We Are Standard; Twin Shadow; Delorentos; Jamie N Commons; Hacktivist; The Bots; Syberia; Zuloak; You don't know me Daniless DJ / Göo; Elyella Djs; Sr. Chinarro y Bel Bee Bee

=== 2014 ===
Number of visitors: 120.000

Stages
10 July	11 July	12 July
Franz Ferdinand; Phoenix; Vetusta Morla; Crystal Fighters; John Newman; White Lies; Hercules and Love Affair; Parquet Courts; The Last Internationale; Allen Stone; Dorian; Future of the Left; Kostrok; Eskean Kristo; The Suicide of Western Culture; This not many djs Za! Los Pilotos	The Prodigy; Jack Johnson; Bastille; Foster the People; Conor Oberst; Frank Turner & The sleeping souls Palma Violets; Dawes; El Columpio Asesino; Izal; Chet Faker; The 1975; Baio; Sine3; Croissant djs Anímic; Lasers; Clip! Pional; El Txef_A	The Black Keys; MGMT; The Lumineers; Band of Horses; Los Enemigos; Skaters; Belako; John Talabot; Kuroma; La M.O.D.A; Elliott Brood; The Rebels; Smoke Idols; WLDV; M a j e s t a d Fira Fem; Kresy; Headbirds; Cardupuser

=== 2015 ===
Number of visitors: 120.000

Stages
9 July	10 July	11 July
Mumford & Sons; Disclosure; Counting Crows; Future Islands; BRMC; Capital Cities; Of Montreal; Bleachers; Triggerfinger; Dover; Totally Enormous Extinct Dinosaurs; Monarchy; Marmozets; Buffetlibre; Novedades Carminha; Olde Gods; Músculo! Larregi (banden lehia); Javi Green; Boreals; Exxasens; Nueva Vulcano	The Jesus and Mary Chain; Alt-J; Ben Harper and the Innocent Criminals; Azealia Banks; James Bay; Chromeo Dj Set; Catfish and the Bottlemen; We Were Promised Jetpacks; Shaka Ponk; Arizona Baby; Zea Mays; Begun Live; Fort Romeau; Dj Fra; The London Souls; Jupiter Lion; Der Panther; Siesta! Nazca; Huias; Grises; Champs	Muse; Of Monsters and Men; SBTRKT; Kodaline; The Cat Empire; Vintage Trouble; The Ting Tings; Delorean; Sheppard; Zoot Woman; Julio Bashmore; Bear's Den; Lapalux; Marc Piñol; Trajano! The Parrots; Elyella DJs; Sau Poler; Señores; Muñik; Caveliers of Fun; John Grvy; Neuman; I am dive

=== 2016 ===
Number of visitors: 102.865

Stages
7 July	8 July	9 July
Arcade Fire; New Order; M83; Chvrches; Hot Chip; Years & Years; Blood Red Shoes; Hola a Todo el Mundo; Hidrogenesse; French Films; Hinds; Little Scream; DMA's; Gallant; K-X-P; Rural Zombies; Begiz Begi; Them flying monkeys Ochoymedio DJs; Dark DJ	Pixies; Underworld; Love of Lesbian; Ocean Colour Scene (Performing Moseley Shoals); Grimes; José GonzáLez; We Are Standard; Belako; Junior Boys; Slaves; C. Tangana; Sophie; Nudozurdo; Blossoms; Hana; John Berkhout; Inheaven; Green Class; David Kano; Daniless	Foals; Tame Impala; Editors; Father John Misty; Soulwax; Courtney Barnett; 2Manydjs DJ Set; Wolf Alice; Jagwar Ma; Triángulo de Amor Bizarro; León Benavente; Mcenroe; Juventud Juché; Bad Breeding; Soleá Morente; Soledad Velez; Yellow Big Machine; Correos; Dekot; Bilbadino DJ

Basoa
7 July	8 July	9 July
Four Tet; Floating Points; Joe Goddard (Hot Chip); Horse Meat Disco (Severino & Jim Stanton); ABU SOU	Erol Alkan; Tim Sweeney; Fort Romeau; Jeremy Greenspan & Borys; Edu Imbernon; Undo	âMe; Red Axes; Agents of Time Live; Pional; Cpi (Marc Piñol & Hugo Capablanca); JMII; Javi Green

=== 2017 ===
Number of visitors: 112.114

Stages
6 July	7 July	8 July
Depeche Mode; Justice; The 1975; Austra; Cage the Elephant; Spoon; The Avalanches; Xoel López; Cabbage; Circa Waves; GusGus; Idles; Niña Coyote eta Chico Tornado; Rrucculla; Rufus T. Firefly; Vulk; Zazkel; David Van Bylen; Dj Maadraassoo	The Killers; Phoenix; Fleet Foxes; Royal Blood; Explosions in the Sky; Trentemøller; Anímic; Carla Morrison; Coque Malla; Empty Files; Izaro; Jens Lekman; Jessy Lanza; Joe Goddard (live); Los Punsetes; Sundara Karma; The Amazons; Daniless B2B Dark DJ; The Horrors DJ Set	Die Antwoord; Two Door Cinema Club; Primal Scream; Brian Wilson presents Pet Sound !!! (chk chk chk); Blonde Redhead; Aterciopelados; Los Bengala; Biznaga; Dellafuente & Maka; Kokoshca; Saint Motel; The Lemon Twigs; The Orwells; The Parrots; Naranja; WhoMadeWho; JotaPop DJ marc Dorian DJ set

Basoa
6 July	7 July	8 July
Dixon; The Black Madonna; Mike Servito; Honey Soudsystem; Baldo	Daphni; DJ Tennis; Marvin & Guy; Nicola Cruz; Bawrust	Andrew Weatherall; Motor City Drum Ensemble; Job Jobse; Lena Willikens; Javi Green

=== 2018 ===
Stages
12 July	13 July	14 July
Florence and the Machine alt-J; Childish Gambino; Bomba Estéreo; Cigarettes After Sex; Mount Kimbie; Bad Gyal; Gaz Coombes; Iseo & Dodosound; Parquet Courts; Temples; Ed is Dead; Let's Eat Grandma; Lukiek; Maria Arnal i Marcel Bagés; Melenas; Morgan; Quentin Gas & Los Zíngaros; Rural Zombies; Edu Anmu; Inmir	The xx The Chemical Brothers; My Bloody Valentine; David Byrne; Friendly Fires; Fat White Family; Meute; Neuman; Mexrrissey; Porches; Sophie; Anteros; Borrokan; Carolina Durante; Cecilia Payne; Gengahr; Nunatak; Pet Fennec; Dark Dj; Hal9000; Rock Nights	Gorillaz; Noel Gallagher's High Flying Birds; Benjamin Clementine; Fischerspooner; Hot Chip Megamix; James; Jungle; Ana Curra; Bejo; Cooper; Nilüfer Yanya; Triángulo de Amor Bizarro; Young Fathers; Aneguria; GreenClass; Joe La Reina; Las Odio; The Zephyr Bones; Yonaka; DaniLess; Dj Mato; Dj/Göo

Basoa
12 July	13 July	14 July
Modeselektor (DJ Set); Prosumer; Optimo (Espacio); Skatebård; Cora Novoa	Ben UFO; Hunee; Avalon Emerson; Dekmantel Soundsystem; Dj Fra	John Talabot; Anthony Naples; Young Marco; Samo DJ; Daniel Baughman

Lasai
Romy; Ramzi; Luka Productions; Young Turks dj DJ Lilocox	Joe Goddard; Sophie; Slow Porn; Sutsche; Ibon Errazkin	Discodromo; Tolouse Low Trax; Magic Teapot Records; YY; Olivia

=== 2019 ===
Stages
11 July	12 July	13 July
Liam Gallagher; Thom Yorke Tomorrow's Modern Boxes; Modeselektor live Nils Frahm; Vetusta Morla; John Grant; Khruangbin; Nicola Cruz live Slaves; Sleaford Mods; Yaeji; The Voidz; Baiuca; BELATZ; Biig Piig; DELAPORTE; Derby Motoreta's Burrito Kachimba; EraBatera; IDER; Mr K Ms. Nina; SUA; The Psychotic Monks	The Strokes; Rosalía; Suede; The Blaze; Brockhampton; Idles; Omar Souleyman; Princess Nokia; Second; Anari; ANTIFAN; Cecilio G. DJake; Georgia; Jonathan Bree; The Intergalactic Republic of Kongo; Lester y Eliza; Mourn; Mueveloreina; Olatz Salvador; Oso Leone; UNIFORMS; Zaza	Weezer; The Good, the Bad & the Queen; Hot Chip; Vince Staples; 2 Many DJ's DJ Set; Cut Copy; HVOB Live; Kero Kero Bonito; Nadia Rose; Nathy Peluso; Shame; Alien Tango; Boy Azooga; Cala Vento; Charlotte Adigéry; Cupido; Las Ligas Menores; Nøgen; Pony Bravo; Serrulla; Viagra Boys

Basoa
11 July	12 July	13 July
Honey Dijon; Midland; Octo Octa; Courtesy; Ketiov	Laurent Garnier; Bicep DJ Set; DJ Seinfeld; Moxie; Álvaro Cabana	John Talabot; Todd Terje DJ Set; DJ Dustin; Tama Sumo; Alicia Carrera

Lasai
11 July	12 July	13 July
Casper Tielrooij; Elena Colombi; Fort Romeau; Miravalles; Orpheu The Wizard	DJohnson; Julian Falk; Mislav; Muevelocumbia; Olivia	Fenna Fiction; Ninja; Nuel; Phuong Dan; Sacha Mambo

== Impact ==
The 2012 edition is said to have left an economical impact estimated in over 17.5 million euros, taking into account the expenditures of the general public, organization, sponsors, and artists during the three days of the festival. This indicates an increase of 1.3 million when compared to the previous edition. During festival days, the city's hotels had an occupancy rate of 95%. LTI spokesman, Alfonso Santiago, stated that Bilbao has established itself as the third Spanish concert capital, behind Madrid and Barcelona.

Along with Aste Nagusia, the local patronage festival held each August, BBK Live is often cited as an important component of the city's cultural offer, and responsible for the 200,000 tourists that Bilbao receives each summer. Many travel agencies offer special packages with transportation, accommodation and festival tickets.

== Venue ==
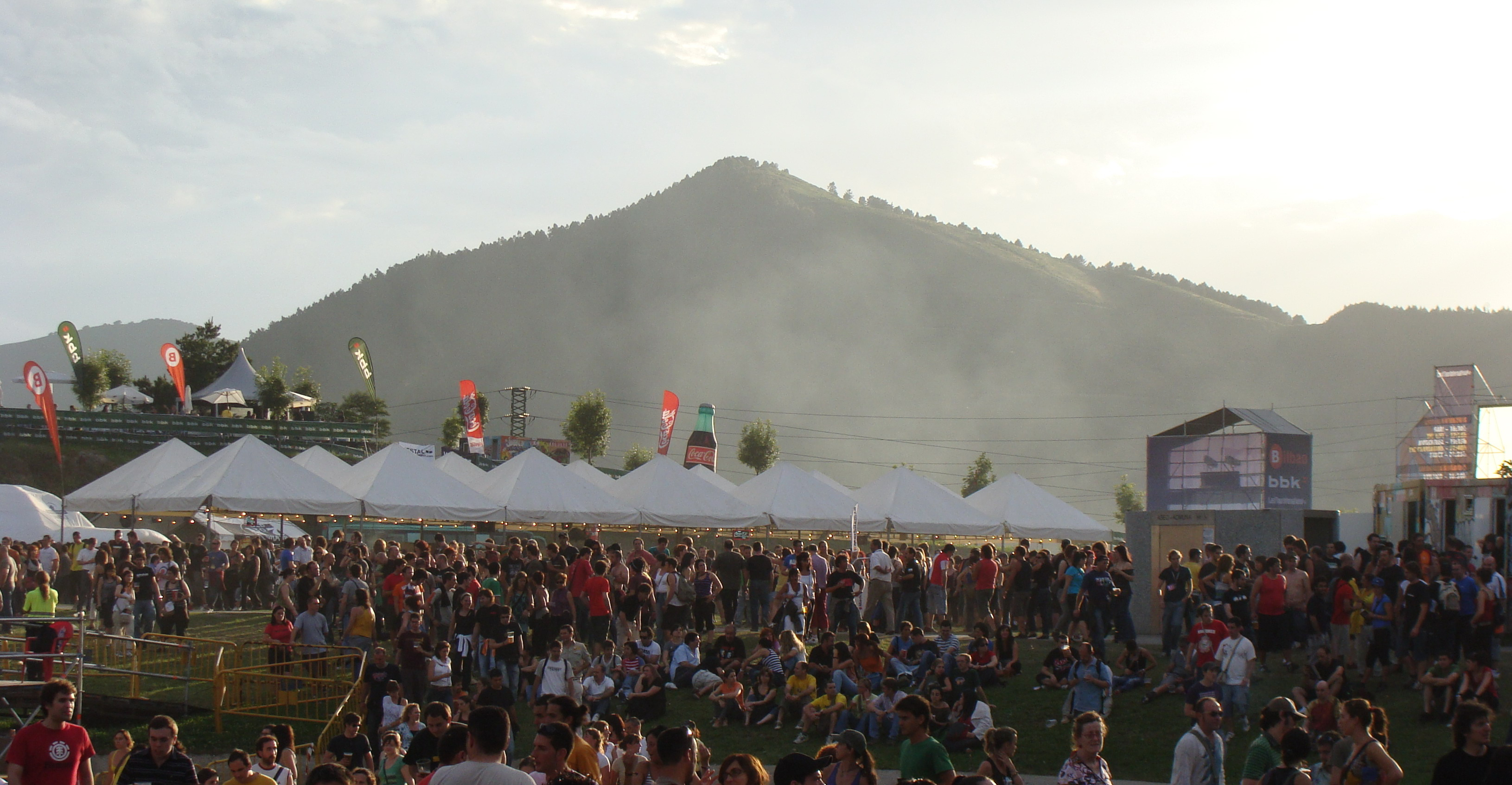
The food and drink stands during the 2008 edition.

Bilbao BBK Live is an open-air festival that takes place at Kobetamendi, located in Mount Cobetas, southeast from the city centre. With 18.5 ha (46 acres), it is Bilbao's largest park. The venue is built each year around a 110,000 m^{2} area and features three main stages, a DJs Tent, VIP zone, backstage facilities, food and drinks markets, and two camping areas, that total 30,000 m^{2} (320,000 sq ft) and have a total capacity of 15,000 people.

== Bilbao BBK Live Bereziak ==
Since 2011, the organization decided to arrange a series of spin-off concerts to be held at Sala BBK, a small venue located at the centre of the city, on the Gran Vía, the city's main street. Under the name Bilbao BBK Live Bereziak (Basque: Bilbao BBK Live Specials), it consists of a cycle of small profile concerts with a very limited capacity, distributed along the year. Among the artists that participated in this specials are: Lambchop, M. Ward, and Tortoise.
