= Escuela de Odio =

- Origin: La Felguera, Asturias
- Genres: Hardcore punk, crossover thrash
- Years active: 1993–present
- Website: escueladeodio.net

Escuela de Odio (Hate School in Spanish language) is a hardcore punk group from La Felguera, Asturias, Spain.

== History ==
The group was formed in La Felguera (Llangreu) in 1993, originally as a trio (Pirri, Rubén, Iván).

After numerous local performances, the band edited its first full album in 1998 (El sueño de los que no duermen – The dream of those that don't sleep). In 2000, now with Santo Grial Records, Escuela de Odio edited Cuando los mudos griten, los sordos sentirán el miedo (When the mute scream, deaf will feel fear). Rubén left the band that year, and was replaced by Michel. Escuela de Odio recorded a new album in 2004, after some years of little activity. After that, they had numerous tours, including and European tour in 2006, and a Mexican one in 2007.

The band recorded an EP with Habeas Corpus in 2010, a song with Roger Miret (Agnostic Front) and another one with Juan (Soziedad Alkoholika)

== Members ==
- Pirri – vocals (1993–)
- Guti – bass (1996–)
- Fonso – guitar (1998–)
- Michel – drums (2000–)

== Past lineup ==
- Ruben – drums (1993–2000)
- Ivan – guitar (1993–1998)
- Roger Miret – vocals
- Juan Aceña – vocals
- Marcos – guitar
- Sabino – bass
- Marqui – guitar

== Ideas ==
The majority of the lyrics of the group are either about social or political issues (Like antifascism, antimilitarism, antiauthoritarianism, anticapitalism or asturianism). The social reality of Asturias (unemployment, social protests, riots, poverty, deindustrialization, ...) is the most common theme in the lyrics. The group sings in both the Spanish and Asturian languages, although the majority of songs are in the first one.

== Discography ==
- La Escuela del Odio (1995) (demo)
- La Razón del Pensamiento (1996) (demo)
- El sueño de los que no duermen (1998)
- Cuando los mudos griten, los sordos sentirán el miedo (2000)
- De la esclavitud a las cenizas (2004)
- Quien siembra miseria, recoge la cólera (2008)
- Que nada nos pare (2009) (Direct)
- A Dolor (2010) (Split with a Habeas Corpus)
- Una democracia manchada de sangre (2012)
- Solo nos queda luchar (2015)
