= Mount Cobetas =

Mountain in Bilbao, Spain

Coordinates: 43°15′30″N 2°57′50″W

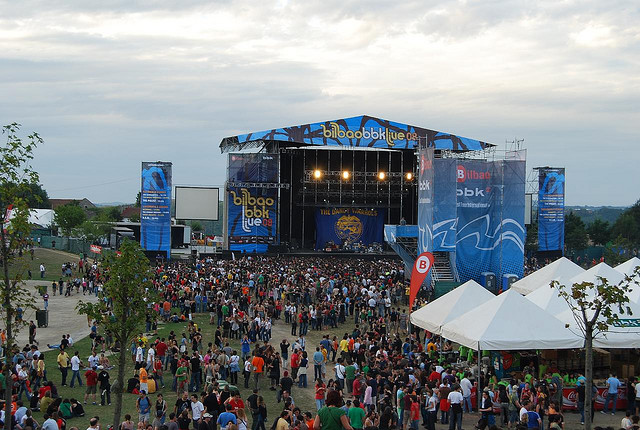
The main stage of the 2008 edition of the Bilbao BBK Live music festival, in Mount Cobetas.

Mount Cobetas (Spanish: Monte Cobetas; Basque: Kobeta Mendi) is a hill in the city of Bilbao, Spain. It is located southwest from the city center and stands 205 m (673 ft) high. It raises between the neighborhoods of Altamira and Zorroza, both located in the district Basurto-Zorroza. It was refurbished in 2005 and became the largest park of the city, with an area of 18.5 ha (46 acres). On the top stands the ruins of the Altamira Fort, used during the Spanish Civil War.

It is known locally as the location of the open air music festival Bilbao BBK Live, that takes place during the first weekend of July.
