= Eraso! =

Basque metal band

- Origin: Zarautz, Gipuzkoa, Basque Country, Spain
- Genres: Metal, rock
- Years active: 1996 – present
- Labels: Unsigned
- Members: Sergio Ruiz – vocals, guitar Nestor Urdanpilleta – guitar Ander Izeta – bass Iñigo Beitia – drums
- Past members: Amaiur Cajaraville – bass Javi – drums
- Website: www.erasomania.com

Eraso! (Basque for "Attack!") is a Basque metal band from Zarautz, Gipuzkoa, Basque Country, formed in 1996. The band's line-up consists of four members and have released four studio albums all written and performed in Basque.

== Biography ==
After two demos and 150 concerts they recorded their first studio album Erantzunik Gabe (Without An Answer) in 1999, and were selected by Slayer as support band during 2000. Their second album Oraina Eta Geroa (Present And future) recorded more professionally, was an inflection point in their career, during this time they shared stage with bands like Machine Head, Sepultura and Napalm Death. Since then they have released two more albums: Grisez Bustitako Egunak (Grey Dunked Days) nn 2003 and Kontra (Against) in 2005.

== Members ==
- Sergio Ruiz – vocals, guitar
- Nestor Urdanpilleta – guitar
- Ander Izeta – bass
- Iñigo Beitia – drums

== Discography ==
- Erantzunik Gabe (Mil A Gritos, 1999)
- Oraina Eta Geroa (Mil A Gritos, 2001)
- Grisez Bustitako Egunak (Metak, 2003)
- Kontra (Metak, 2005)

== Music videos ==
- "Gertaerak"
- "Aurrera"
