= Rise to Fall =

Spanish heavy metal band

- Origin: Bilbao, Spain
- Genres: Melodic death metal, alternative metal Metalcore
- Years active: 2006–present
- Labels: Coroner Records, Nonstop Music Records, Soulfood, Noble Demon
- Members: Alain Gutiérrez "Dalay Tarda"; Hugo Markaida; Javier Martin; Xabier del Va "Txamo"; Dann Hoyos
- Website: www.risetofall.net

Rise to Fall is a Spanish heavy metal band from Bilbao. Their music is strongly influenced by the Swedish melodic death metal scene. The band was formed in 2006 and they started recording an album in 2008. They released their first studio album Restore The Balance in 2010 under the label Coroner Records. During the same year they performed in the festival Bilbao BBK Live 2010.

The band performed in many pubs and festivals in Spain and other countries with bands like Rammstein, Slayer, Bullet for my Valentine, Amon Amarth, Scar Symmetry, The Agonist, Dagoba, Textures etc. In 2011, they toured in Japan between the cities Nagoya, Osaka and Tokyo with the Italian band Destrage and the Japanese band Blood Stain Child. The band released their second album Defying The Gods in 2012.

== Members ==
- Dalay Tarda - vocals
- Dann Hoyos - lead guitar
- Hugo Markaida- guitar
- Javi Martín- bass
- Xabi “Txamo” - drums

== Discography ==
- Restore the Balance (Coroner Records / Nonstop Music Records) - 2010
- Defying the Gods (Coroner Records / Soulfood) - 2012
- End VS Beginning (Coroner Records) - 2015
- Into Zero - 2018
- The Fifth Dimension (Noble Demon) - 2023

=== Videos ===
- "Redrum - 2010
- "Whispers of Hope" - 2012
- "The Threshold" - 2015
- "End Vs Beginning" - 2017
- "Burning Signs" - 2017
- "Acid Drops" - 2018
- "In the Wrong Hands" - 2018
