= Aphonnic =

Spanish metalcore band

- Origin: Vigo, Spain
- Genres: Metalcore; alternative metal; hard rock; nu metal
- Years active: 2001–present
- Label: Maldito Records

Aphonnic, sometimes stylized as APHONNIC, is a Spanish metal band from Vigo that was formed in 2001 by members of O Pequeno Baltimore.

The group has won some local awards, including Maketon given by Los 40 Vigo to the best album by a local group, which has been won by the band for 3 years in a row. They were also awarded the Martín Codax Prize in the metal category year 2017.

== Members ==
- Chechu - vocals
- Iago - guitars
- Richy - bass
- Alén - drums

== Discography ==
- Silencce (2003)
- Foolproof (2006)
- 6 Bajo Par (2009)
- Héroes (2013)
- Indomables (2016)
- La Reina (2020)
- Crema (2024)
