= Angelus Apatrida =

Spanish thrash metal band

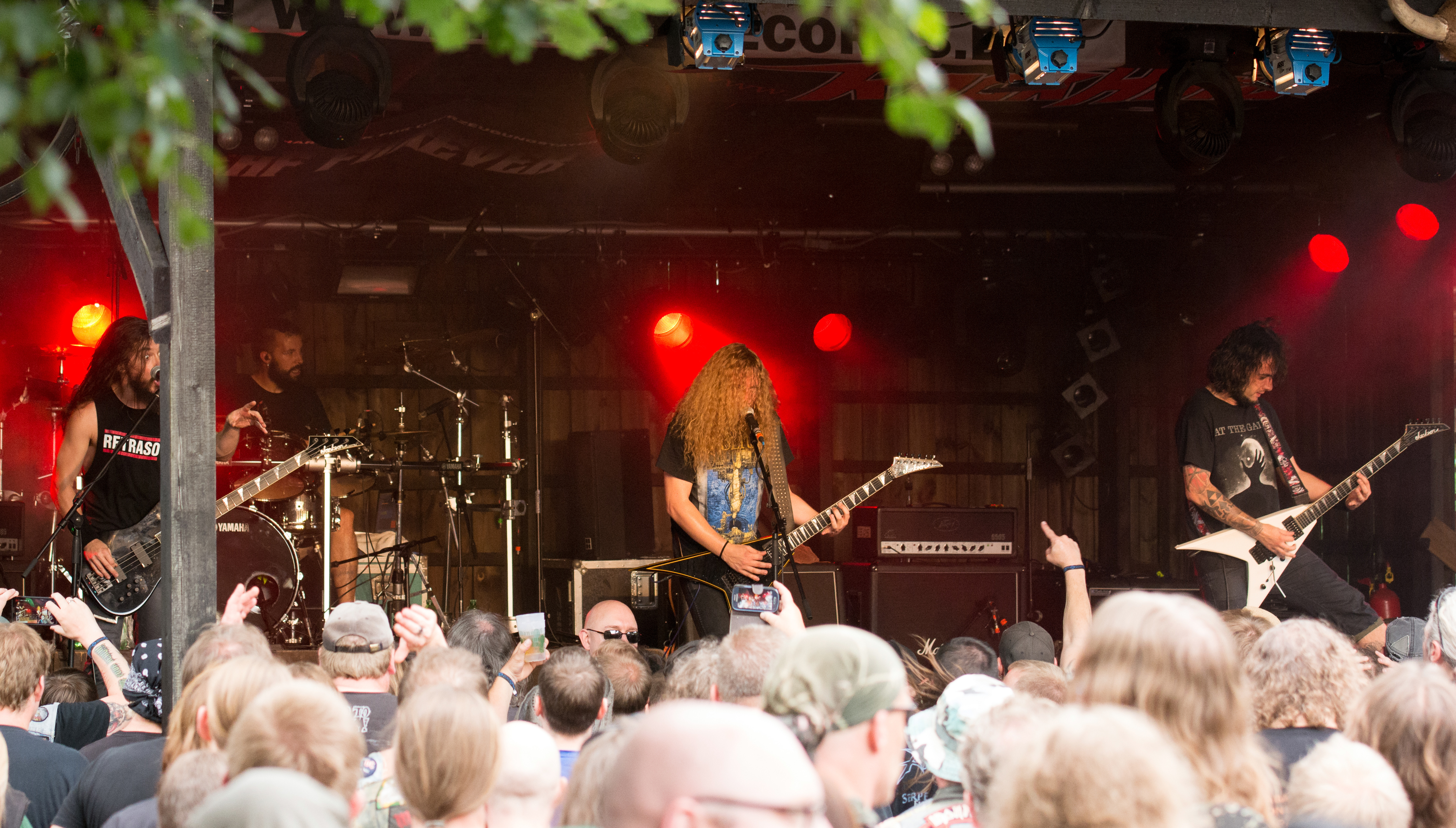
- Angelus Apatrida at Headbangers Open Air 2016

Background information
- Origin: Albacete, La Mancha, Spain
- Genre: Thrash metal
- Years active: 2000–present
- Label: Century Media
- Members: Guillermo Izquierdo; David G. Alvarez; Jose Izquierdo; Victor Valera
- Past members: Alberto Izquierdo; Alberto Gayoso
- Website: angelusapatrida.com

Angelus Apatrida is a Spanish thrash metal band formed in Albacete in 2000.

== History ==
=== Early years (2000–2003) ===
Angelus Apatrida was formed as a heavy/power metal band. Two demos were recorded in this period: Lost in the Realms of Orchinodaemon (2001) and Unknown Human Being (2003). With the latter, the band developed a post-thrash metal style.

With those demos the band started to play live shows supporting other bands like Saratoga and their popularity soon increased. They won a competition of bands and signed their first contract with the label Red Dragon and recorded the song "Danza de la Muerte" for a tribute album for the Spanish heavy metal band, Panzer.

The contract with Red Dragon Records was for three albums. The band recorded the first one, called Evil Unleashed in the Korsakov studios in Madrid during the summer of 2004 produced by Kosta Vázquez but it was never released due to problems with the label. Eventually, the band decided to break the contract with Red Dragon and to re-record the album one year later.

=== Evil Unleashed (2003–2006) ===
Evil Unleashed was re-recorded in the Studio54 studio in Valencia, produced by Enrique Soriano and mastered by Dave Horrocks in Canada at the Infinite Waves studio. The album was edited by Angelus Apatrida in March 2006 with Producciones Malditas. It was distributed through K-Industria all over the country.

The album received good reviews and Angelus Apatrida was considered as one of the most sensational new bands of the country. It sold many copies in Spain and other countries.

Angelus Apatrida started its first important tour with the Evil Unleashed Tour through many locations in Spain as well as recognized fests like Thrash Attack and Viña Rock, playing together with international bands like Sepultura and Horcas and supporting others like Warcry and Destruction.

=== Give 'Em War (2007–2008) ===
After the first album and the Evil Unleashed tour, the band started recording a new album one year later. They recorded Give 'Em War at the New Life studios in Madrid produced by José A. Garrido and Daniel Melian, mastered by Kosta Vázquez at the Oasis studios and distributed by Mastertrax.

The album was faster, darker and more aggressive than the previous one. The album received many good reviews and the band became one of the most representative bands Spanish thrash metal. It sold many copies all over the world and started a long tour in September 2007. The tour included shows all over the country and others in Europe, in many different fests or as supporting acts.

Three songs off the album were co-written with Edward S Duke (edtrax) from The United States. (Thrash Unlimited Radio) TU Radio pushed the promotion of the album by extensive airplay leading to listeners worldwide voting it as one of the best overall thrash releases of 2008.

=== Century Media Records and Clockwork (2009–2011) ===
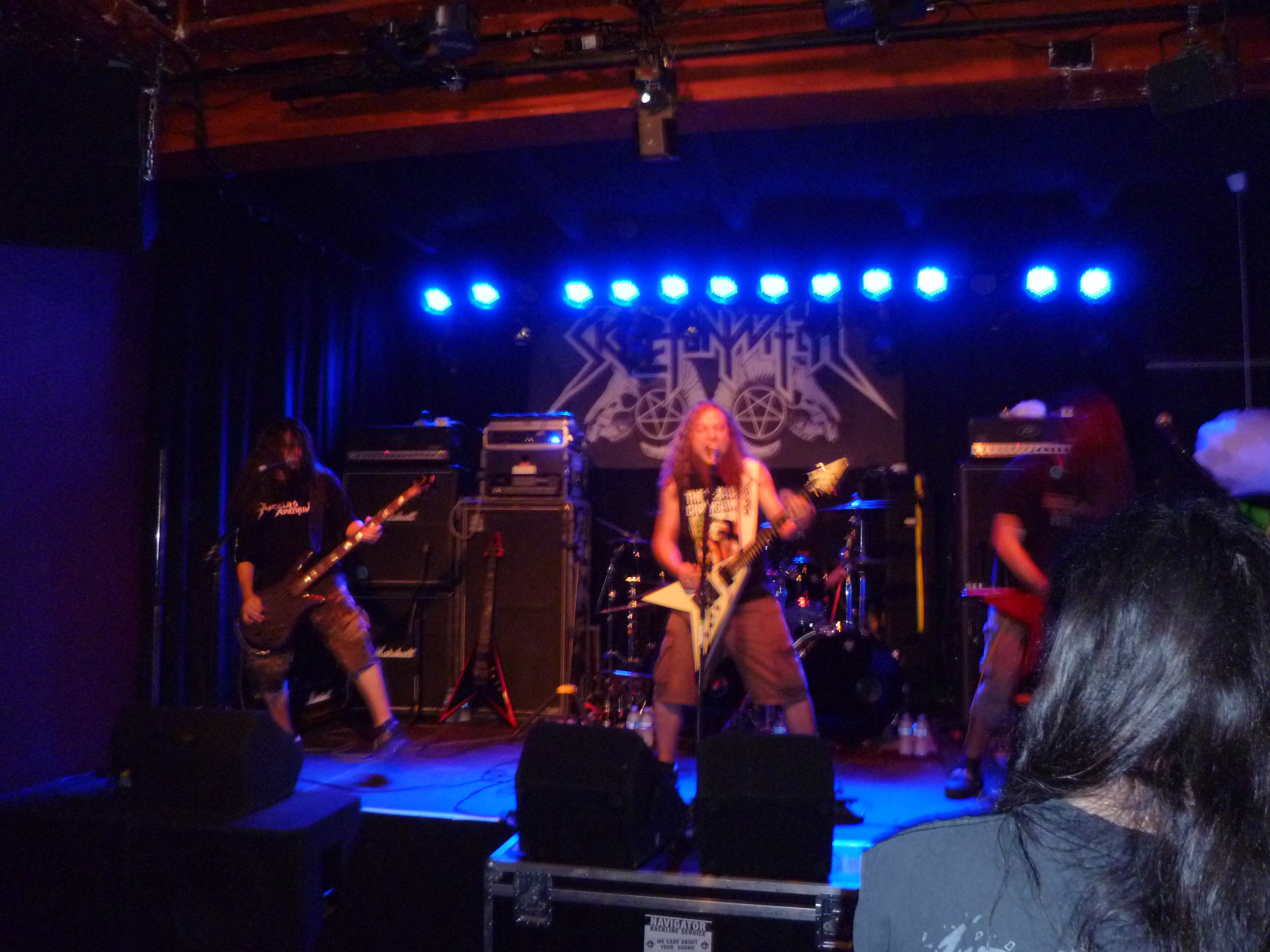
The band on tour with Skeletonwitch, 2009

In December 2009, Angelus Apatrida signed a worldwide deal with major label Century Media Records and toured with Swedish metal act Arch Enemy in Spain and Portugal. In January 2010, the band finished the recording sessions of their third album entitled Clockwork, the first for Century Media, which was recorded at the Portuguese studios Ultrasound with the producer Daniel Cardoso. The album was released on 21 June 2010, and it landed at position No. 44 on the official Spanish chart. On 28 October, the band released the music video for Blast Off, directed and produced by Stuff & Nonsense and directors Adriana Lorente and Sara Cort.

=== The Call, re-release of Evil Unleashed and Give 'Em War (2012–2014) ===
On 13 April 2012, Angelus Apatrida released their fourth studio album titled The Call, produced by Daniel Cardoso. Angelus Apatrida commented on the new album's opening song "You Are Next" and the material on The Call as follows: "We think that 'The Call' is a record that represents the wide variety of styles and elements in our music extremely well; every song stands alone strong and unique in its own way, making the album a whole piece that needs to be heard completely to get the full idea of the sound of the band. But, if we had to choose one song to represent the whole thing, it would be 'You Are Next' because, both lyrical and musically, it showcases the anger and fury we wanted to put into this album, and also reflects the step forward we feel we have made technically. It's a song that starts slowly and trying to capture the listener before exploding into a furious sonic assault." The Call entered the official chart in the band's home country, Spain, at position No. 14. This marked Century Media Records' highest-ever chart entry in that country.

On 18 September 2013, Angelus Apatrida announced their next European tour in November-December together with Havok and Savage Messiah, supporting their upcoming re-release of the band's first two albums as a double-disc set entitled Evil Unleashed / Give 'Em War, out in Europe via Century Media Records on 18 November 2013. This marked the first time that their first two albums, Evil Unleashed (2006) and Give 'Em War (2007), were properly made available outside of the band's home territory of Spain. The re-release gathered both albums onto a 2 CD package adding new layouts, liner notes and pre-production demo-tracks as a bonus. The creative team involved with this re-release is the same as on the previous two Angelus Apatrida albums, Clockwork (2010) and The Call (2012): Daniel Cardoso handled remastering duties for the material and Gustavo Sazes / Abstrata (Arch Enemy, Firewind, Dream Evil, etc.) revamped the artwork.

=== Hidden Evolution (2015–present) ===
Produced by Daniel Cardoso, their fifth studio album, Hidden Evolution, was released on 19 January 2015. Lead singer, Guillermo Izquierdo commented that he believes that the album is the band's most technical, and the perfect presentation of Angelus Apatrida. The artwork for Hidden Evolution was handled by Gyula Havancsák / Hjules.com, who has also created album sleeves for bands such as Annihilator, Destruction, Stratovarius, Grave Digger and Nightingale. Cabaret de la Guillotine, featuring one of their most well-known songs ("Sharpen the Guillotine") followed in 2018. The eponymous album Angelus Apatrida was released on 2021, conquered the top of the official album charts in Spain and also marked the band’s first ever chart entries in Germany and Switzerland.

On 20 October 2023, the band released their eighth album Aftermath and promoted it with a world tour, which included an Australian and Asian leg supported by Adelaide thrash metal band Hidden Intent. Guillermo Izquierdo would provide backing vocals on the title track of Hidden Intent's 2025 album Terrorform.

New Album "The Reckoning" out November 19, 2026 via Napalm Records.

== Members ==
=== Current members ===
- Guillermo Izquierdo – guitars, lead vocals
- David G. Alvarez – guitars, backing vocals
- Jose Izquierdo – bass, backing vocals
- Victor Valera – drums, backing vocals

=== Former members ===
- Alberto Izquierdo – drums
- Alberto Gayoso – lead vocals

== Discography ==
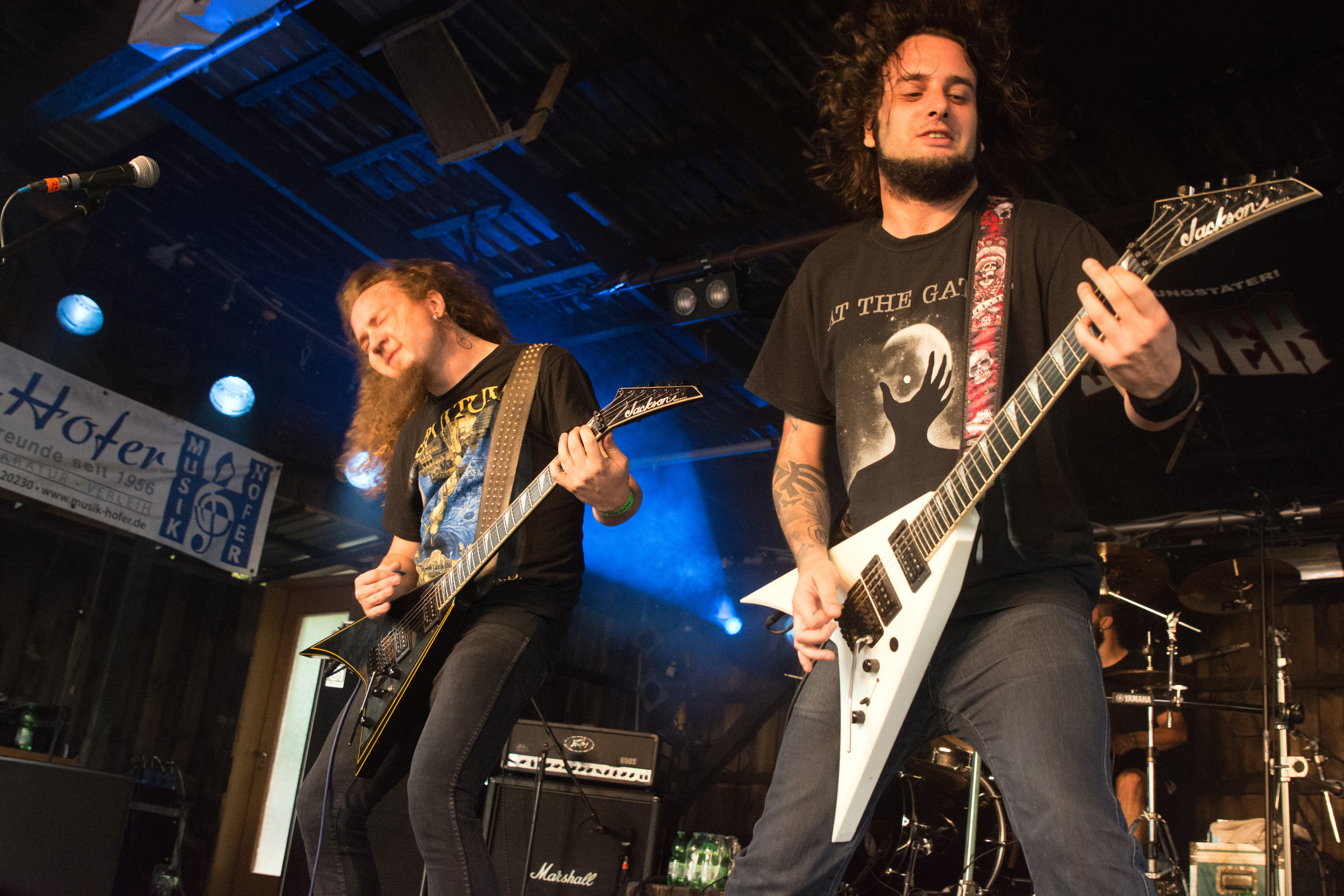
Angelus Apatrida performing in 2016

=== Studio albums ===
- Evil Unleashed (2006, Maldito Records / K-Industria)
- Give 'Em War (2007, Molusco Discos / Mastertrax)
- Clockwork (2010, Century Media Records)
- The Call (2012, Century Media Records)
- Hidden Evolution (2015, Century Media Records)
- Cabaret de la Guillotine (2018, Century Media Records)
- Angelus Apatrida (2021, Century Media Records)
- Aftermath (2023, Century Media Records)
- The Reckoning (2026, Napalm Records)

=== Demos ===
- Lost in the Realms of Orchinodaemon (2001)
- Unknown Human Being (2003)

=== Music videos ===
- "Blast Off", 2010
- "You Are Next", 2012
- "End Man", 2014
- "Serpents on Parade", 2015
- "'Downfall of the Nation", 2018
- "Farewell", 2018
- "Bleed the Crown", 2020
- "Cold", 2023
- "Cycle of Ruin", 2026
