= Vhäldemar =

Spanish metal band

Vhäldemar is a Spanish power metal and melodic heavy metal band from Basque Country. They have released seven albums, two of which on Arise Records and three on Fighter Records.

The band hails from Barakaldo.

== Select discography ==
- Fight to the End (2002)
- I Made My Own Hell (2003)
- Metal of the World (2010)
- Shadows of Combat (2013)
- Old King's Visions (EP, 2017)
- Against All Kings (2017)
- Straight to Hell (2020)
- Sanctuary of Death (2024)
