= Soziedad Alkoholika =

Spanish thrash metal band

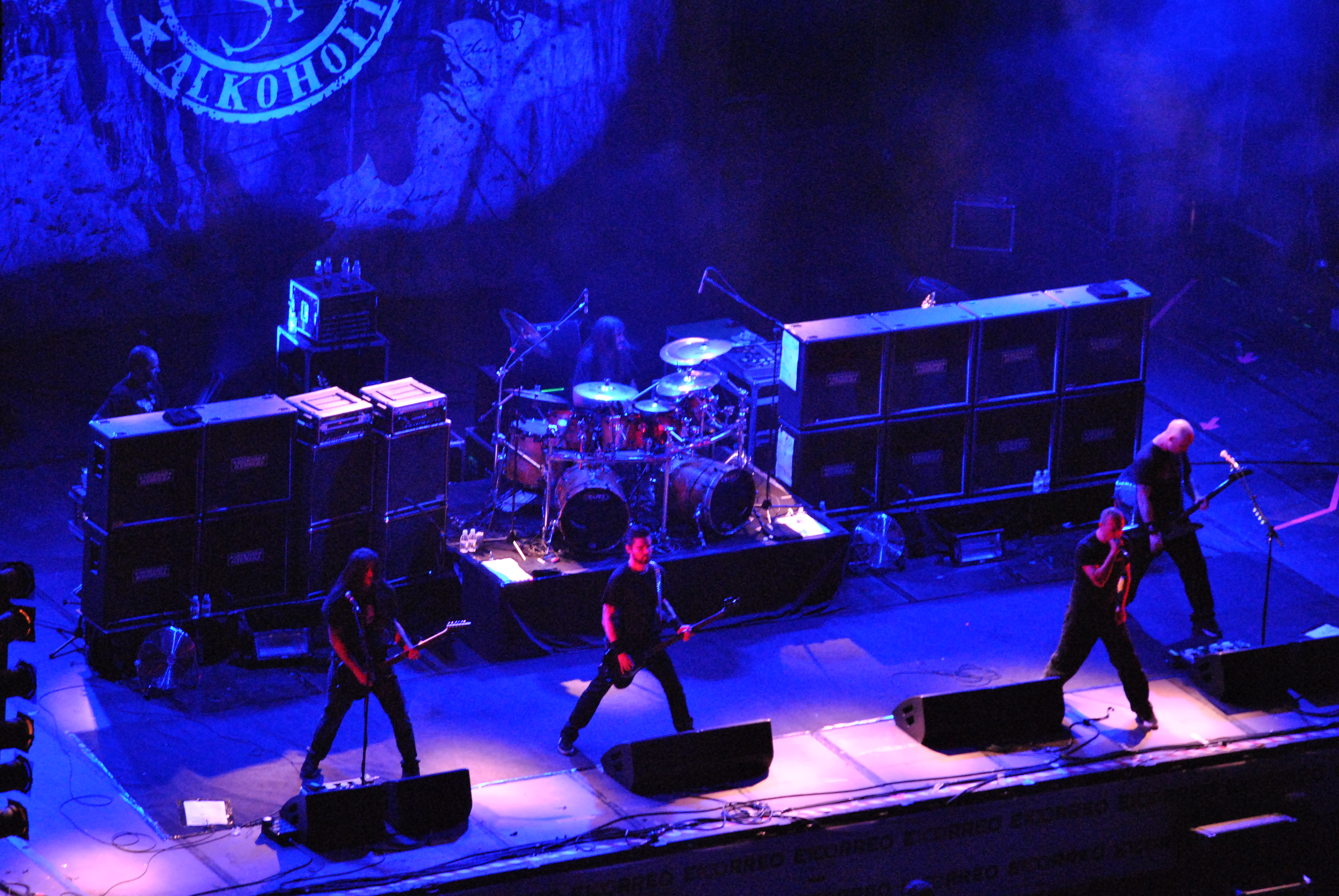
- Soziedad Alkoholika in 2010

Background information
- Also known as: SA
- Origin: Basque Country, Spain
- Genres: Crossover thrash, hardcore punk, thrashcore
- Years active: 1988–present
- Labels: Overdrive, Oihuka Diskak, Roadrunner, Mil A Gritos, Locomotive
- Members: Juan; Jimmy; Iñigo; Pirulo; Alfred Berengena
- Past members: Iñaki; Pedro; Oscar; Javi; Roberto
- Website: soziedadalkoholika.com

Soziedad Alkoholika ("alcoholic society"), commonly abbreviated to S.A., is a crossover thrash band from the Basque Country in Spain. They were founded in Vitoria-Gasteiz in 1988. Their lyrics tend to have a crude, direct and somewhat emotional approach to politics and, among others, deal with issues such as: militarism, fascism, racism, sexism, state violence and monarchy.

Over the years S.A. has become a controversial and yet successful band with considerable impact in the underground Spanish and Latin American punk and metal scenes.

From 2002 to 2006 the band was repeatedly accused by Asociación de Víctimas del Terrorismo (AVT) and other right-wing groups of glorifying ETA's terrorism,. They were ultimately acquitted of all charges, but as a consequence of this controversy, S.A. has been banned by some conservative local governments from playing in several places in Spain, Madrid being one of them.

Soziedad Alkoholika denounces an alleged lack of freedom and state oppression in the Basque Country, defends the right to self-determination and advocates for the dismantlement of the Basque Police Forces Ertzaintza. It also calls for the independence of the Basque Country, opposes animal testing and supports the Palestinian cause against the State of Israel.

== Members ==
- Juan Aceña – vocals (1988–present)
- Jimmy – guitar (1988–present)
- Pirulo – bass (1996–present)
- Iñigo Zubizarreta – guitar (2009–present)
- Alfred Berengena – drums (2014–present)

=== Past members ===
- Roberto Castresana – drums (1988–2014)
- Iñaki Bengoa – bass (1988–1996)
- Oskar – guitar (1988–1990)
- Pedro – guitar (1990–1997)
- Javi García – guitar (1998-2009)

== Discography ==
Year	Name	Label	Format
1990	Intoxikazión etílika	DDT	Demo
1991	Soziedad Alkoholika	Overdrive	CD/LP
1992	Feliz Falsedad EP	Overdrive	CD/EP
1993	Y Ese Que Tanto Habla, Está Totalmente Hueco, Ya Sabéis Que El Cántaro Vacío Es El Que Más Suena	Oihuka	CD/LP
1995	Ratas	Mil a Gritos Records	CD/LP
1996	Diversiones...?	Mil a Gritos Records	CD/LP
1997	No Intente Hacer Esto En Su Casa	Mil a Gritos Records	CD/LP
1999	Directo	Mil a Gritos Records	CD
2000	Polvo en los Ojos	Mil a Gritos Records	CD
2003	Tiempos Oscuros	Locomotive	CD
2008	Mala Sangre	Roadrunner Records	CD/LP
2009	Sesion#2	Roadrunner Records	CD/LP
2011	Cadenas De Odio	Mil A Gritos Records	CD/LP
2013	Caucho Ardiendo EP	Noise	Digital download
2017	Sistema Antisocial	Maldito	Digital download

=== Videos ===
Year	Name	Label	Format
1994	Kontzertua Gaztetxean	DDT	VHS
2006	Corrosiva!	Locomotive	DVD/CD
