= Rock music in Spain =

Music genre or scene

Spanish rock is the term used for the variety of rock music produced in Spain. Most bands formed in Spain have sung in Spanish, but many others have sung in English, French and Italian, in addition to the other languages spoken in Spain, such as Catalan, Galician, Basque, Aragonese, and Asturian.

== History ==
=== Beginnings (1950s–early 1960s) ===
At first, rock music was influenced by the surrounding countries like France or Italy. Despite Francoist censorship, many albums were released and mass media started to introduce the new sounds of international music. The most important rock scenes were in Madrid, Zaragoza, Sevilla, Cádiz, Barcelona, and Valencia.

=== Beat, pop, psychedelia (1960s) ===
Rock in Spain started to spread nationally. After the British Invasion, many artists such as Los Bravos, Lone Star, Los Brincos and Miguel Ríos appeared. Los Brincos achieved some international success in France, Portugal and Italy. Los Bravos hit some international charts with their single "Black Is Black", as did Mike Ríos with "A Song of Joy".

=== Progressive and hard rock (1970s) ===
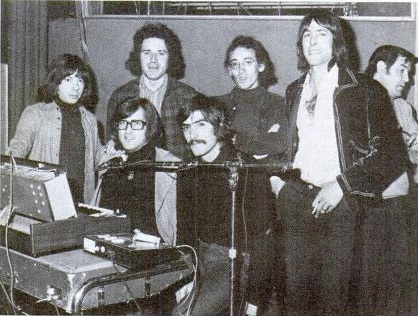
Triana in the recording studio of their debut album.

While mainstream Spanish rock declined during this decade, the underground scenes of progressive rock and rock urbano emerged. Spanish progressive rock was a commercial failure. In the mid-1970s, a new style called Andalusian rock that combined flamenco with prog rock started to gain some popularity with bands like Triana. During the Spanish transition to democracy in the late 1970s, hard rock acts appeared. Some hard rock bands influenced by early punk rock like Leño pioneered the rock urbano movement.

=== Golden Era. New wave, post-punk, heavy metal and punk (1980s) ===
Punk rock in Spain started its most successful stage with punk bands like Kortatu, La Polla Records and Eskorbuto. La Movida Madrileña was a countercultural movement that produced many bands influenced by punk and new wave, such as Kaka de luxe, Derribos Arias, Radio Futura, Alaska y Dinarama, Gabinete Caligari, Nacha Pop, Loquillo y los Trogloditas, Glutamato Ye-Yé and Los Secretos. Since many of the bands from La Movida did not achieve enough commercial success, many discographies left them supporting other bands like Mecano, which achieved some international success, Siniestro Total, or Aerolíneas Federales. As echoes of the Madrid scene, parallel movements emerged in other cities such as Barcelona (with bands like Loquillo y los trogloditas or Los Rebeldes), León (Los Cardiacos, Los Flechazos...), Vigo (Siniestro Total, Golpes Bajos, Os Resentidos, Aerolíneas Federales, Semen Up...), Granada (091), etc. Hard rock acts such as Los Suaves or Barricada emerged with lack of promotion. Heavy metal bands also appeared in the early 1980s like Barón Rojo and Obús.

=== Indie and alternative (1990s–present) ===
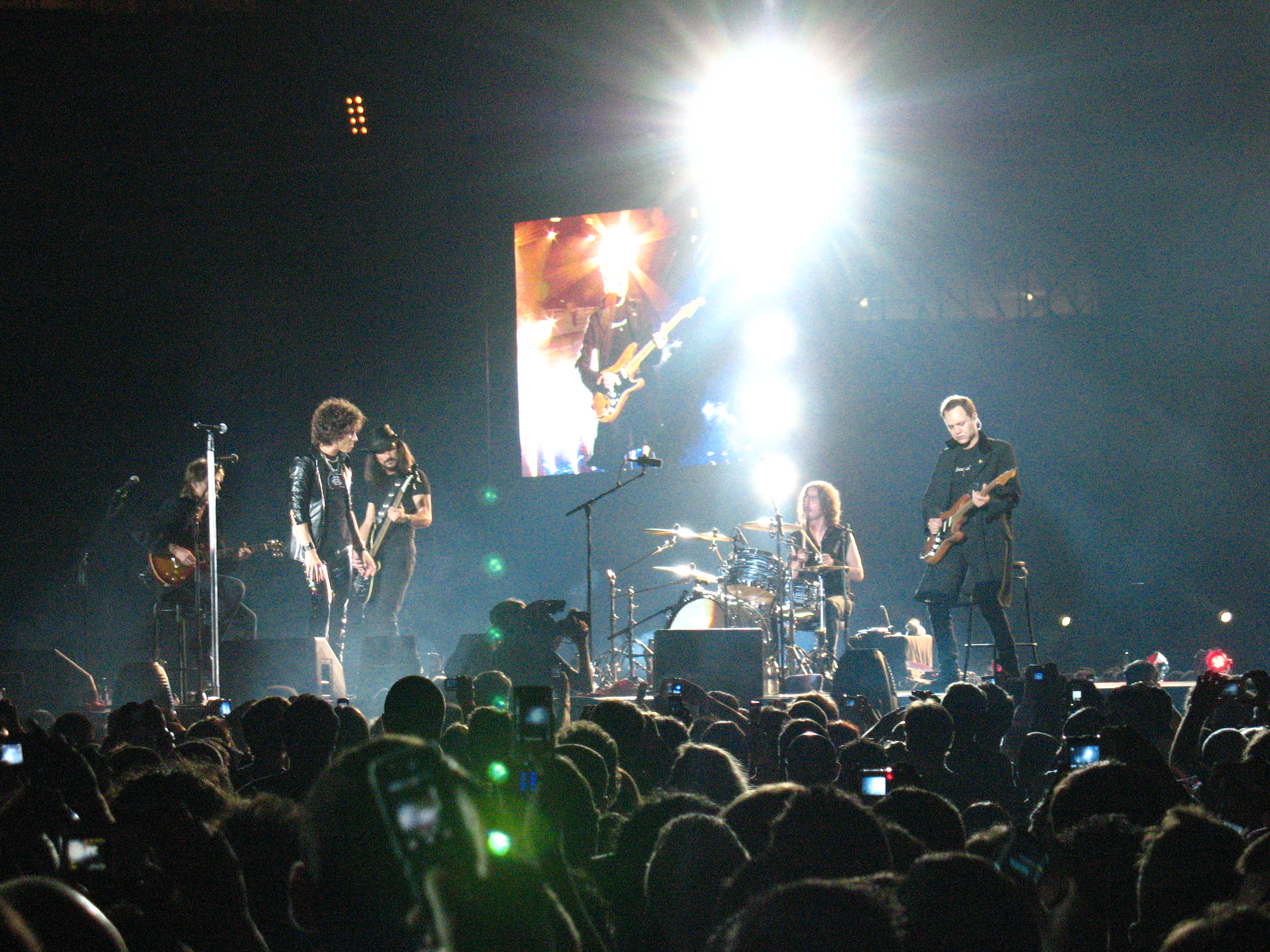
Héroes del Silencio playing live in 2007.

The band Héroes del Silencio achieved international success, hitting some charts in Europe and Latin America. Los Rodríguez also became popular in Spain and Latin America. In the mid-1990s, some cult bands like Los Enemigos, Extremoduro and Platero y Tú started to achieve mainstream success. Indie rock bands like Los Planetas appeared. Ska-punk band Ska-P and folk metal band Mägo de Oz emerged, showing the rise of rock diversification.
