= Alaska (singer) =

Spanish-Mexican singer

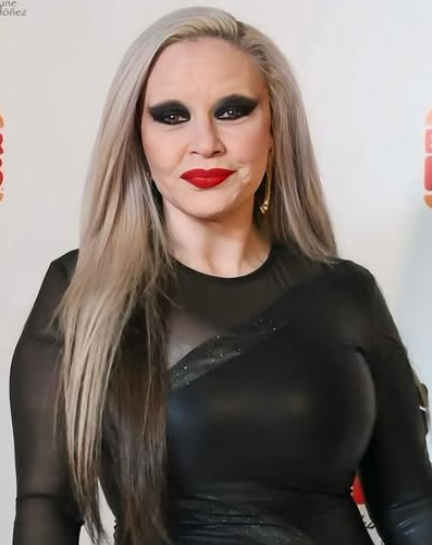
- Alaska in 2024
- Born: Olvido Gara Jova; 13 June 1963 (age 63); Mexico City, Mexico
- Other name: The Mexican Acid Queen
- Occupations: Singer; songwriter; actress; record producer; television host; author; DJ; businesswoman
- Years active: 1977–present
- Spouse: Mario Vaquerizo (m. 1999)
- Musical career
- Origin: Madrid, Spain
- Genres: Pop; electronica; rock; dance
- Labels: Chapa Discos; Zafiro; Hispavox; DRO; GASA; Metal Sonic Disco; Running Circle; Subterfuge; Warner Music Spain
- Member of: Fangoria
- Formerly of: Kaka de Luxe; Alaska y los Pegamoides; Negros S. A.; Alaska y Dinarama

Olvido Gara Jova (born June 13, 1963), known professionally as Alaska, is a Spanish-Mexican singer, songwriter, actress, television host and DJ. She was born and raised in Mexico City, until the age of 10, when her family moved to Spain. In Spain, she was a guitarist in the group Kaka de Luxe, until 1979, when she became the vocalist and composer of Alaska y los Pegamoides, a group with which she reached her first number one thanks to "Bailando", acquiring great recognition at a national level and in some Spanish-speaking countries. From 1983, she was the vocalist and composer of Alaska y Dinarama; group with which she continued releasing albums that reached a wide popularity. Many of her songs have reached number one on the music charts in Spain and wide recognition in several Spanish-speaking countries; her biggest hits include songs such as "Perlas ensangrentadas", "Rey del Glam", "Cómo pudiste hacerme esto a mí", "Ni tú ni nadie", "A quién le importa", "La funcionaria asesina", "Mi novio es un zombi" and "Quiero ser santa".

She has appeared in several films, television and radio programs. In the 1980s she was in La bola de cristal (1984-1988), a television program broadcast on Televisión Española, which reflected the socio-political change brought about by the Spanish transition, as well as the cultural and musical explosion known as the “movida madrileña”. As an actress, her most recognized role was in Pepi, Luci, Bom and Other Girls on the Heap (1980), a feature film written and directed by Pedro Almodóvar. Among her work in television stands out her participation as a juror in Lluvia de estrellas (2001), as a presenter in Alaska y Segura (2014-2015), the Benidorm Fest 2022 and starring in the reality show Alaska y Mario (2011-2018), with her husband.

Since 1989 she has been a member of Fangoria, an electronic music group that she leads together with Nacho Canut, who has accompanied her since her musical beginnings. The group began as part of the underground movement, and gained popularity with the release of their second album, Una temporada en el infierno (1999). Their greatest hits include songs such as "No sé qué me das", "Eternamente inocente", "Retorciendo palabras", "Miro la vida pasar", "Entre mil dudas", "Criticar por criticar", "Absolutamente", "Dramas y comedias", "Geometría polisentimental" and "Espectacular".

Influenced by several personalities, Alaska is recognized for her changing and transgressive aesthetic sense with respect to music, fashion, live performances and music videos.

== Life and career ==
=== 1963–1976: Early life ===
Olvido Gara Jova was born in Mexico City, Mexico, on June 13, 1963. Her father, Manuel Gara López, was Asturian, and her mother, América Belén Jova Godoy, is Cuban. The Gara family is originally from Gijón, her father having emigrated from Spain in exile during the Spanish Civil War. Alaska is the only daughter of the couple, although she has two step-siblings on her father's side, Manuel and Berta. On her mother's side, Alaska is related to a large part of the Cuban aristocracy, among them the presidents of the republic Osvaldo Dorticós Torrado and Miguel Mariano Gómez, through her mother América Arias; or the philanthropists Marta Abreu and Rosalía Abreu.

At the age of 10, in 1973, she emigrated to Spain with her parents and her maternal grandmother. For Alaska, the drastic cultural change was a hard blow, so she took refuge in books and comics that replaced the Mexican television culture. Among them was the book Gay Rock, by Eduardo Haro Ibars, where she took David Bowie and Lou Reed as cultural references. During her first years in Spain, she studied a course in aesthetics and dramatic art under the influence of glam rock, which determined her aesthetics as an artist. Throughout 1977, Alaska began to frequent the El Rastro in Madrid with her friend El Zurdo. Due to the latter's previous musical experience, the idea of creating a magazine and a group arose. Alaska, on the other hand, adopts her artistic name for the fanzine Bazofia. The name "Alaska" comes from the song "Caroline Says II" by Lou Reed, in the phrase "All her friends call her Alaska".

=== 1977–1982: Career beginnings, Kaka de Luxe and Alaska y los Pegamoides ===
During 1977 the punk rock band Kaka de Luxe is born, formed by Alaska, Carlos Berlanga, Nacho Canut, El Zurdo, Manolo Campoamor and Enrique Sierra. The first performance takes place in People, located in the neighborhood of Argüelles, Madrid, where Alaska debuts as the group's guitarist. In 1978, thanks to their participation in the Concurso Rock Villa de Madrid, where they came in second place, they released their first EP Kaka de Luxe (1977). Finally, in that same year the group dissolved due to differences between the members, and some of the male members began their military service.

Alaska y los Pegamoides was a Spanish band formed in 1979, after the dissolution of the group Kaka de Luxe, which included four of its members: Alaska, Nacho Canut, Manolo Campoamor and Carlos Berlanga. These musicians realized that they shared greater affinities among themselves than with the rest of the members of Kaka de Luxe, and decided to go their separate ways, since their musical and artistic interests were completely different. In its early stages, the band counted with the collaboration of Poch, who would later integrate Ejecutivos Agresivos and form Derribos Arias, as a solo guitarist. Javier Hamilton (better known as Javier Furia), who had been part of Kaka de Luxe, also joined the band to be in charge of backing vocals, although shortly after he joined Radio Futura. The departure of their first drummer, Álvaro de Torres, also a former member of Kaka de Luxe, was due to ideological disagreements, such as his refusal to use a drum machine that Alaska had acquired for her compositions, as well as other conflicts such as a discussion related to Alaska's habit of eating pipes during the recordings without offering them to her bandmates.

With the departure of Álvaro, the band incorporated two new members: Ana Curra, whom they met at the emblematic Madrid bar El Penta, and Eduardo Benavente, who joined after passing a test, after Juan Luis Vizcaya, the previous drummer, left the band due to his disagreement with the inclusion of keyboards in the group. The line-up continued to evolve, and another important change was the departure of Manolo Campoamor, who had initially been the vocalist. After his departure, the position was temporarily filled by Carlos Berlanga, until finally Alaska assumed the main role of vocalist, abandoning the guitar. Manolo Campoamor adopted the new identity of Eddie Neopreno and tried to form a new band under that name. Despite these changes, Alaska y los Pegamoides remained active and participated in the tribute concert to Canito, the drummer of Tos, who died in a traffic accident in February 1980. This was the first and only concert of the group in which they used a drum machine instead of a traditional drum kit.

Once this new formation was consolidated, the band recorded their first single, "Horror en el hipermercado", produced by Julián Ruiz, in 1980. This song was relatively successful, which allowed the recording of their second single, "Otra dimensión", the following year. In 1981, a parallel group to Pegamoides emerged, Parálisis Permanente, formed by Nacho Canut and Eduardo Benavente, whose sound reflected the British punk tendencies of the time, influenced by bands such as Killing Joke, GBH and The Exploited. In addition, Alaska and Ana Curra participated in the project Negros S.A., together with Los Nikis, while Curra and Benavente created another parallel group called Los Seres Vacíos. All these projects released albums in 1982, just when Alaska y los Pegamoides were enjoying their greatest success. On May 20, 1982, Alaska y los Pegamoides released their only album, Grandes éxitos, which included the iconic hit single "Bailando". Throughout their career, the band experimented with different aesthetics, ranging from colorful pop to a darker image linked to punk and goth.

The dissolution of Alaska y los Pegamoides began to take shape during the recording of their only album, between the end of 1981 and the beginning of 1982, which led to the departure of Carlos Berlanga from the group. Despite this, two more singles were released in 1982, "La línea se cortó" and "En el jardín" (the latter a limited edition flexi disc, which was given away to concertgoers). Meanwhile, Berlanga formed Dinarama with his childhood friend Nacho Canut. Internal tensions within Alaska y los Pegamoides were the trigger for their dissolution, and, after a successful period, the band broke up definitively at the end of 1982.

=== 1970s and 1980s ===
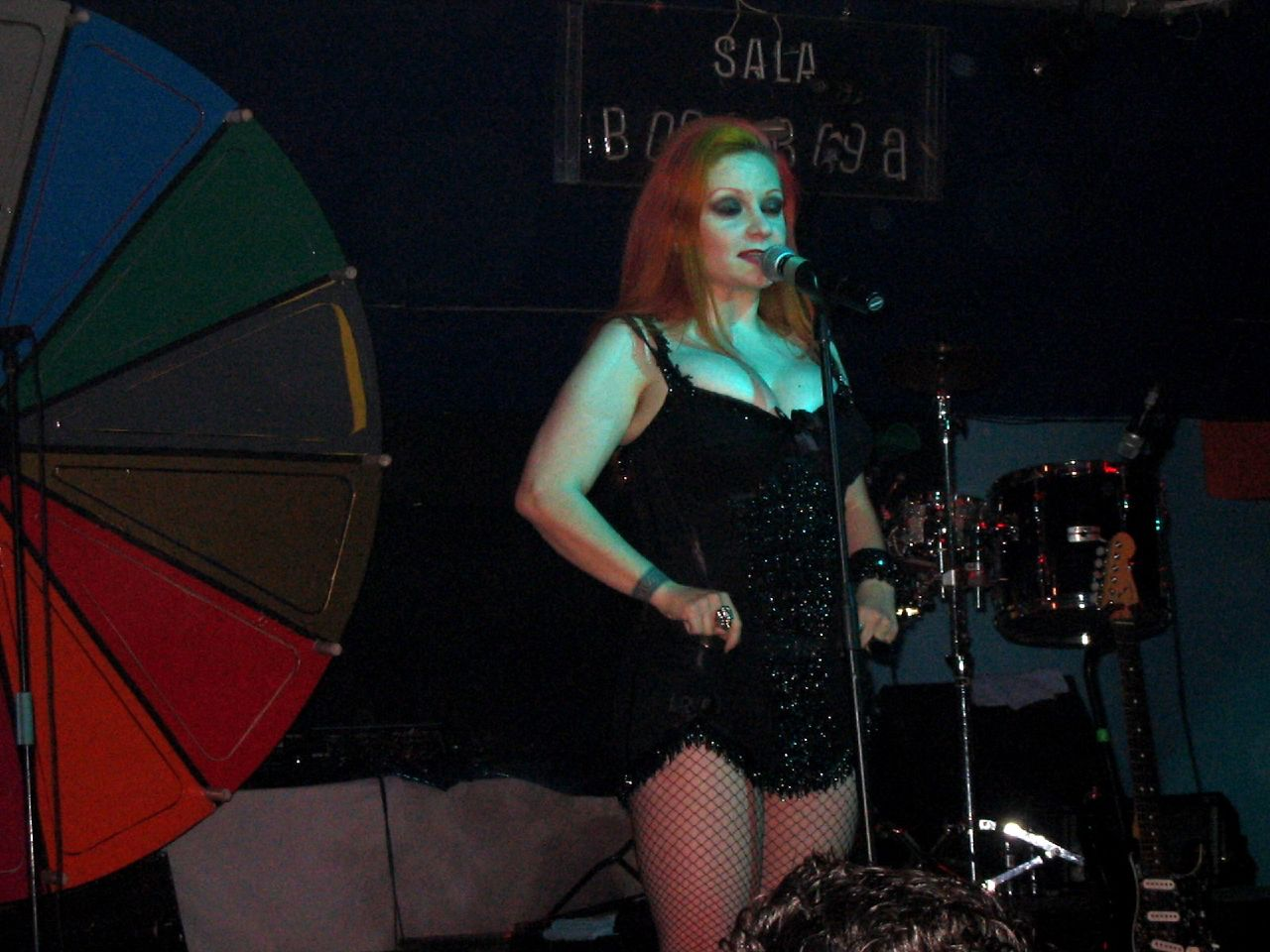
Alaska performing in Madrid, Spain

In 1977, Alaska along with Fernando Márquez, Nacho Canut, Carlos Berlanga and Enrique Sierra, among others, formed the band Kaka de Luxe, one of the first Spanish punk rock bands, where she played rhythm guitar. In 1979, Gara, Canut, Berlanga, Ana Curra and Eduardo Benavente formed the band Alaska y los Pegamoides. Alaska was lead singer for the first time with the group "Pegamoides". They took the name as a tribute to one of the bands they admired: Siouxsie and the Banshees. Due to some artistic differences, Carlos Berlanga left "Pegamoides", and with Nacho Canut they formed "Dinarama". At this time, Eduardo Benavente and Ana Curra were involved in Parálisis Permanente, one of the first goth bands in Spain. A few months after Carlos Berlanga left the band, "Pegamoides" split up. In 1982, Alaska joined "Dinarama" and the band released their first album in 1983 titled Canciones Profanas under the name Dinarama + Alaska. The band decided to use the name "Alaska y Dinarama" in their following album, Deseo carnal, and they kept the name until 1989. In 1989, Carlos Berlanga left "Alaska y Dinarama" in the middle of their tour of their last album Fan Fatal where all songs are tribute to the bands they loved and admired over the years: Ramones, Siouxsie and the Banshees, Michael Jackson, Depeche Mode, Aviador Dro, Parálisis Permanente, etc.

When "Alaska y Dinarama" split up, Nacho Canut and Alaska decide to call themselves "Fangoria". They changed their music style to electronic pop, in the style of Pet Shop Boys. They released their first album Salto Mortal with Hispavox, their record company since forming "Pegamoides". After that they left the company and released a trilogy with different independent companies: Un día cualquiera en Vulcano I, Un día cualquiera en Vulcano II and Un día cualquiera en Vulcano III. They did not play many concerts. It was during this period that Alaska became an icon for the LGBT community and became very active supporting Madrid Gay Pride.

Subterfuge, an important indie company released Fangoria's next album: Una Temporada en el Infierno, considered by some to be a masterpiece of electronic music. Fangoria started selling loads of CDs and the band became very popular. Another album with Subterfuge, Naturaleza muerta proved that Fangoria was an amazing electronic band and that Alaska was a fantastic performer. Some creative differences with Subterfuge forced Fangoria to leave its new recording label. In 2004, DRO (Warner) released their next album: Arquitectura Efímera.

In the late 1980s, Alaska was the host of a Spanish children's show on Televisión Española called La Bola de Cristal.

=== 21st century ===
In 2005, Fangoria visited Mexico to promote their new album Arquitectura efímera. Alaska appeared on two sketches of Telehit's Desde Gayola (a Mexican parody show). In the first sketch, she appeared as herself in an interview with Tesorito, in the second one, she played the character of Galaxia (a DJ) with Supermana, Chef Ornica & Manigüis.

Since 2011, she starred as herself in the MTV Spain reality series Alaska y Mario, alongside her husband/manager Mario Vaquerizo.

== Collaborations with other artists ==
In 1980, Alaska appeared as Bom in the Pedro Almodóvar film Pepi, Luci, Bom y otras chicas del montón. She has also had cameo roles in films like Airbag, Más que amor, frenesí, etc.

Alaska has collaborated on the soundtracks of The Killer Tongue (La Lengua Asesina) with Robert Englund, The Bear Cub (Cachorro), Bandid Lover (Amante Bandido) in Miguel Bosé's Papito (2007), etc.

In 2025, Alaska featured on Aitana's 4th studio album, Cuarto Azul, with the song LA CHICA PERFECTA.

== Reception ==
American academic and social critic, Camille Paglia, discovered Fangoria's music video "El Cementerio De Mis Sueños" ("The Cemetery of My Dreams") thanks to a reader of her column on www.salon.com, and had the following to say about Alaska in her column dated 10 January 2008:

Alaska, surrounded by Pete Best-style drag queens, is certainly a formidable character. Yards of bosom and assertive orange hair. She doesn't try to hide her age, the way American women actors and performers do. She's mature and flaunts it. No misty, baby-faced, shallow nymphet look for her! There are no parallels to Alaska in current American entertainment - a mark of our cultural poverty and punitive gender norms.

== Discography ==
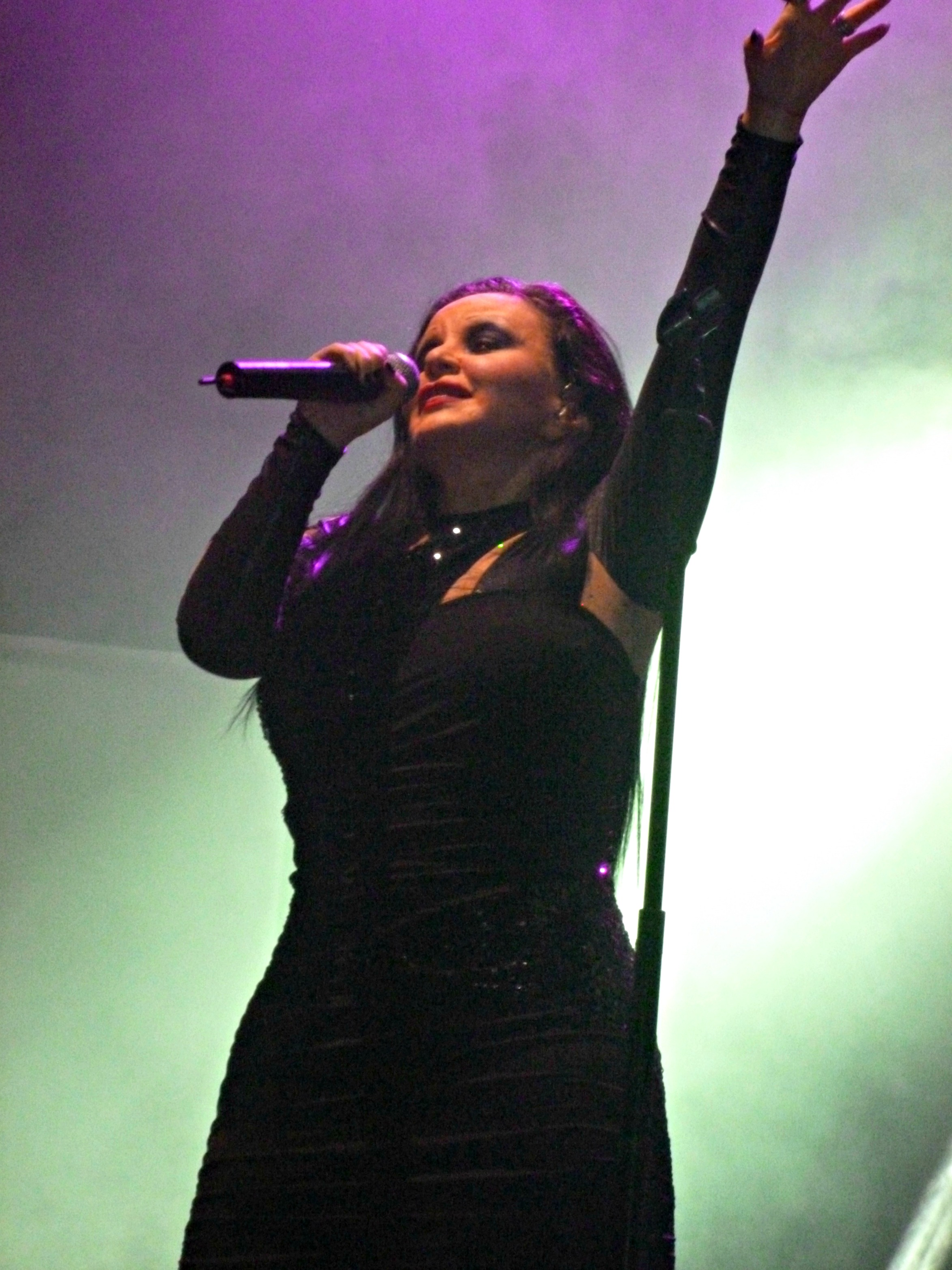
Alaska performing in 2013

=== Kaka de Luxe ===
- Kaka de Luxe (1978)
- Kaka de Luxe/Paraíso (1982)
- Las canciones malditas (1983)

=== Alaska y Los Pegamoides ===
- Grandes Éxitos (1982)
- Alaska y Los Pegamoides (1982)
- Llegando hasta el final (1982)
- Mundo Indómito (1998)

=== Alaska y Dinarama ===
- Canciones Profanas (1983)
- Deseo carnal (1984)
- No es pecado (1986)
- Diez (1988)
- Fan fatal (1989)

=== Fangoria ===
- "Salto mortal" (1990)
- "Un día cualquiera en Vulcano" (Super Extended Play 1.0) (1992)
- "Un día cualquiera en Vulcano" (Super Extended Play 2.0) (1993)
- "Un día cualquiera en Vulcano" (Super Extended Play 3.0) (1995)
- Interferencias (1998)
- Una temporada en el infierno (1999)
- Naturaleza muerta (2001)
- Arquitectura efímera (2004)
- El extraño viaje (2006)
- Entre Punta Cana y Monte Carlo (2008)
- Absolutamente (2009)
- El paso transcendental del vodevil a la astracanada (2010)
- "Policromía" (2013)
- "Cuatricromía" (2012)
- "Canciones para robots románticos" (2016)
- "Pianissimo" (2017)
- "Extrapolaciones y dos preguntas 1989–2000 (2019)
- "Extrapolaciones y dos respuestas 2001–2019 (2019)
- "Existencialismo pop" (2021)
- "Edificaciones paganas" (2022)
- "Exprofeso" (2022)
