= Eduardo Benavente =

- Born: October 30, 1962; Madrid, Spain
- Died: May 14, 1983 (aged 20) Alfaro, Spain
- Genres: punk rock, post-punk, gothic rock
- Occupations: singer, composer
- Instruments: vocals, drums, guitar
- Years active: 1980-1983

Eduardo Benavente Perez (October 30, 1962 - May 14, 1983) was a Spanish musician and the leader of Parálisis Permanente, a cult band of La Movida Madrileña. Benavente died at the age of 20 in a car accident. His untimely death made him into a symbol of the Spanish music scene of the 1980s.

== Musical career ==
Benavente's career began in the group Prisma, along with Toti Árboles y Nacho Cano, later a member of Mecano. After Prisma separated, Benavente and Árboles formed Plástico, with Benavente on vocals and Árboles on drums. Before the band's first album was recorded, Benavente left the group to form Los Escaparates with Ángel Álvarez Caballero. In 1980, he became the drummer for Alaska y los Pegamoides, where he also composed the lyrics to some songs, including "Volar" and "El jardín".

One year later, in 1981, Benavente and his brother Javier, along with Nacho Canut and his brother, Johnny Canut formed Parálisis Permanente. The band later included Jaime Urrutia, a former member of Gabinete Caligari, Rafa Balmaseda, a former member of Glutamato Ye-Yé and Derribos Arias, and Ana Curra, who was also Benavente's romantic partner at the time. The band released a single album, El Acto, prior to Benavente's death.

== Death and legacy ==
Benavente died on May 14, 1983, near Alfaro in a car accident while travelling from León, where they had been performing with Los Cardiacos, to Zaragoza, where Paralisis Permanente were to perform. He was in the car with Curra and Árboles, who suffered only minor injuries. At the time of his death, Benavente was 20 years old.
