= La Bola de Cristal =

- Created by: Lolo Rico
- Presented by: Alaska
- Country of origin: Spain
- Original language: Spanish

Production
- Production company: Televisión Española

Original release
- Network: TVE1
- Release: October 6, 1984 – June 25, 1988

La Bola de Cristal (English: The Crystal Ball) is a Spanish television show that was broadcast on La Primera Cadena of Televisión Española from 1984 to 1988.

The show was the brainchild of Spanish writer Dolores Rico Oliver (better known for her artistic name, Lolo Rico) and was hosted by pop singer Alaska. The program went beyond the norm set by the children's programs of its time and other more current ones, and bet on treating children as adults, which earned it recognition of different sectors of society. The show, which was ostensibly targeted at a young audience, reflected the spirit of the times, that of the post-Franco Spanish transition and of the cultural and musical movement known as la movida. In contrast to previous shows, with a very childish use of language, it had continuous puns related to electronics: the Electroduendes ("Electrogoblins") puppets included Maese Cámara (Master Camera), Hada Vídeo (the Video Fairy) and Bruja Avería (the Breakdown Witch) as regular characters.

In one of its sections, they used to introduce an episode of classic American series. The first season included The Little Rascals, the second season, The Munsters, and the third season, Bewitched.

Musical acts featured heavily on the program. Many emerging bands from those years, part of the Movida madrileña and its surroundings, appeared on the program. Among them were Alaska, Kiko Veneno, Radio Futura, Glutamato Ye-Yé, Los Cardiacos, Golpes Bajos, Siniestro Total, Loquillo y los Trogloditas, Los Nikis, and more.

La Bola de Cristal also included slogans against authority and capitalism, with political satires that led the show to its cancellation in 1988. Before the cancellation order, at least one new season of La Bola de Cristal was planned, with Sonia Martínez as new presenter.

Although it was never released on VHS video, in 2003 selected excerpts of the series were released on DVD. These DVDs did not feature episodes from The Munsters and Bewitched since they were copyrighted by their owners, but included episodes from The Little Rascals.
