= Tertulia de Creadores =

1983–1984 literary group in Madrid, Spain

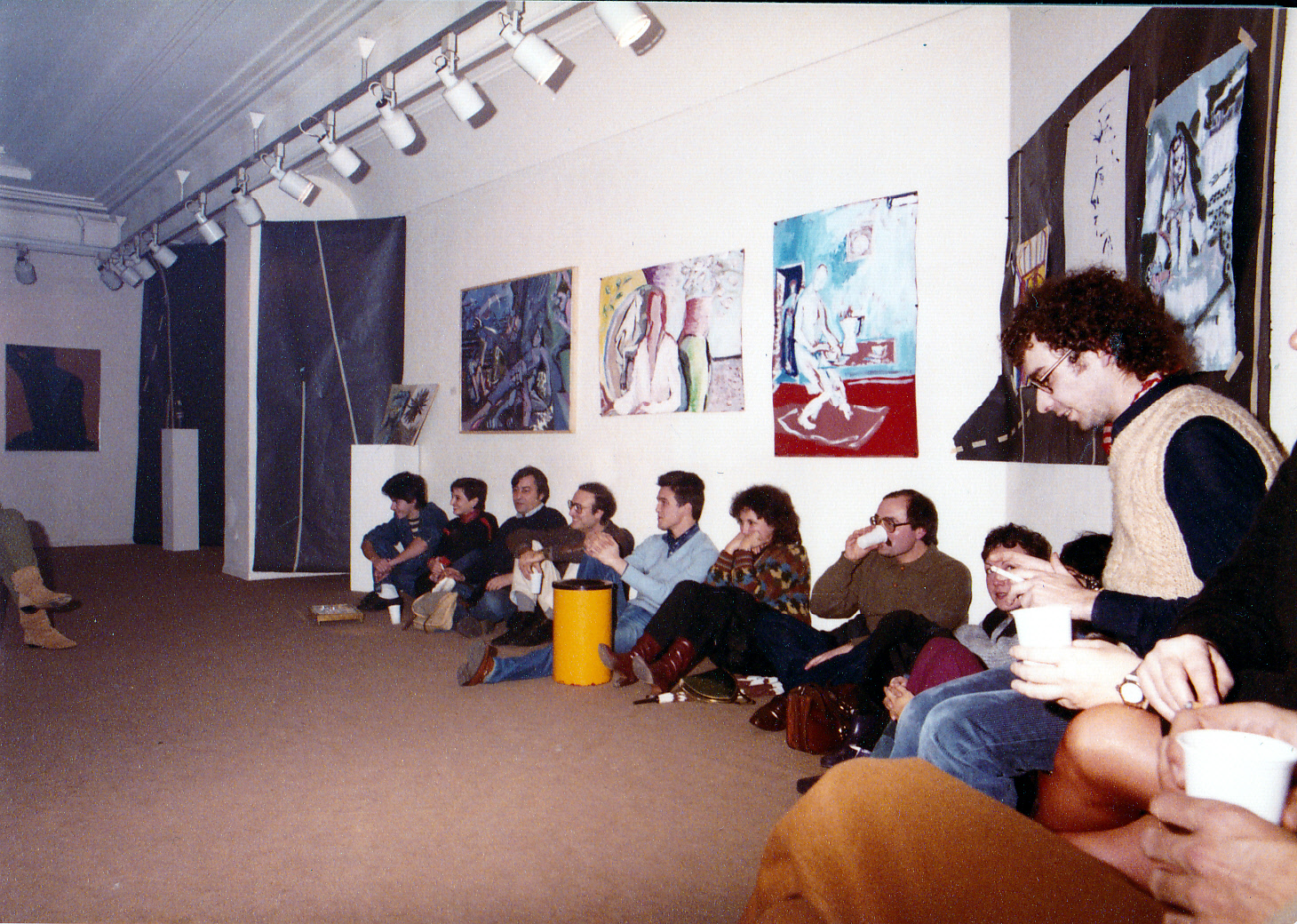
A 1984 session

The Tertulia de Creadores was a Madrileño tertulia at the Círculo de Bellas Artes from 1983 to 1984. Founded by Gregorio Morales, it represented the literary elements of La Movida Madrileña, a countercultural movement during the Spanish transition to democracy following the end of Francisco Franco's regime. Some members—including Morales, José Tono Martínez, and Luis Antonio de Villena—were simultaneously involved in the postmodernist La Luna de Madrid. Espido Freire asserts they defined postmodernity at the institution.

== History ==
In 1982, novelist Gregorio Morales moved to Madrid from Granada and founded the tertulia at the Círculo de Bellas Artes during La Movida Madrileña and rise of postmodernism. On 18 October 1983, the first session, themed "Modernity and postmodernity: an analysis of the current creative moment", was held. Over the next two months they also discussed general literature and cinema. Participants included Vicente Molina Foix, Luis Antonio de Villena, Óscar Ladoire, Íñigo Botas, and Matías Antolín. On 13 March 1984, a second debate entitled "Narrative in postmodernity" was held, in which Morales, Molina, Villena, Javier Barquín, José Tono Martínez, Luis Mateo Díez, José Antonio Gabriel y Galán, José Luis Moreno-Ruiz, and Ramón Mayrata participated. The resulting eponymous publication follows:

Overcoming 19th-century and avant-garde narrative. Complete assumption of the present, precisely to define it, deny it and leap over it. Construction of new realities that show unknown horizons. To be the queen of the arts, vanguard of renovation, the definer of fashions. To set oneself as the linguistic game of the environment, defining and organizing the other games. And despite everything, not to seek trascendente, although humor, irony, heartbreak, or beauty are. To be, in the end, as varied and original as the universe and as humble as an untouchable.

— Narrativa en la posmodernidad, 13 March 1984

Other participants in the group included Vicente Verdú, José Ramón Ripoll, Santiago Auserón, and Ouka Leele.

In 1984, Morales reflected in Ínsula, asserting the comparative accessibility and interdisciplinarity were important aspects of the group. He further covered it in his books La cuarta locura (1989) and La individuación (2003). He later founded the Tertulia del Salón in Granada, which lasted from 1998 to 2011.

== See also ==
- Liviandad del imperdible
- Madrid Me Mata
- Madriz
- Spanish society after the democratic transition
