= Nacho Canut =

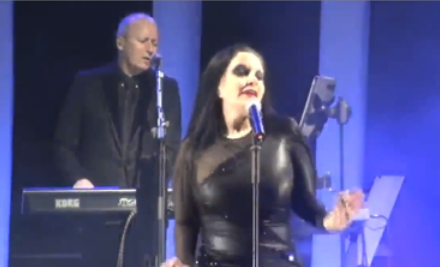
- Fangoria; Canut is in the background

Background information
- Also known as: Jet 7, Caligua 2000
- Born: Ignacio Juan Canut Guillén; 5 June 1957 (age 69); Valencia, Valencian Community, Spain
- Origin: Madrid, Spain
- Genres: Electropop; synthpop; dance-pop; house
- Occupations: Musician; composer; bass player, DJ; record producer
- Instruments: Synthesizer; keyboards; bass guitar
- Years active: 1977–present
- Member of: Fangoria

Ignacio "Nacho" Canut Guillén (born 5 June 1957) is the bass player and the main composer (along with Alaska) of the band Fangoria.

He was also in the music groups Alaska y los Pegamoides and Alaska y Dinarama together with Carlos Berlanga and Alaska.

He started his career with Kaka de Luxe in 1977, one of the first punk bands in Spain. Later, along with Berlanga and Alaska, Nacho Canut formed Alaska y los Pegamoides with Ana Curra and Eduardo Benavente. Alaska y los Pegamoides would become one of the cornerstones of La Movida Madrileña countercultural movement and an important influence for many Spanish punk bands. The name of the band was adopted along the line of Siouxsie and the Banshees (an important and recognizable influence in his music). With this band, Canut achieved hits like "Horror en el Hipermercado", "Bote de Colón", "Llegando Hasta el Final" and "Bailando" (which became an international hit). Songs by Alaska y los Pegamoides appeared in 1982 under the title Grandes Exitos (Hispavox).

After the dissolution of Alaska y los Pegamoides in 1982, Canut, Berlanga and Alaska formed one of the most successful bands of the Spanish eighties, Alaska y Dinarama. Alaska y Dinarama became one of the first glam bands in Spain. Some of the finest songs ever written in the history of modern Spanish music have been composed by Canut and Berlanga. Among them, "Ni tú ni nadie" and "¿A quién le importa?" became hymns for the LGBT Spanish movement, other hits include the massively successful songs, "Mi novio es un zombi", "Quiero ser santa" and "Descongélate".

When Carlos Berlanga left the band, Nacho Canut and Alaska formed a new band, Fangoria in 1989. This band represented a turn from rock to techno-pop, though the rock influence is still felt in certain songs. With this band, he has published nine studio albums, from Salto Mortal (1990) to Absolutamente (2009). Many of his songs have appeared in films like Mondays in the Sun, la lengua asesina, Sex and Lucia and Descongélate.
