= Le Mans (band) =

Spanish indie rock band

- Origin: Spain
- Genres: Indie rock Alternative rock
- Years active: 1993–1998
- Labels: Elefant Records
- Members: Jone Gabarain; Teresa Iturrioz; Ibon Errazkin; Peru Izeta; Gorka Ochoa

Le Mans was an indie rock band from the Basque country, Spain, in existence between 1993 and 1998. Having previously toured and released records under the name Aventuras de Kirlian, the group took a new direction as they hired a new member, Gorka Ochoa, to play the drums.

Together with La Buena Vida it was one of the main exponents of "Donosti Sound", a style similar to twee pop.

In 2000 the Argentine band Suárez recorded the EP 29:09:00, consisting of 5 cover versions of Le Mans songs.

== Line-up ==
- Jone Gabarain - vocals
- Teresa Iturrioz - bass
- Ibon Errazkin - guitar
- Peru Izeta - guitar
- Gorka Ochoa - drums

== Discography ==
=== Albums ===
- Le Mans (Elefant, 1993)
- Entresemana (Elefant, 1994)
- Zerbina (Elefant, 1995)
- Saudade (Elefant, 1996)
- Aquí vivía yo (Elefant, 1998)
- "Catástrofe nº17" (Elefant, 2003)
