= Sultana Wahnón =

Spanish essayist and literary critic

- Born: Sultana Wahnón Bensusan; 8 May 1960 (age 66); Melilla, Spain
- Education: University of Granada
- Occupations: Academic, writer
- Employer: University of Granada
- Organization: Academia de Buenas Letras de Granada

Sultana Wahnón Bensusan (born 8 May 1960) is a Spanish essayist and literary critic, a professor at the University of Granada specializing in literary theory and comparative literature.

== Academic activity ==
Sultana Wahnón graduated in Spanish Philology in 1982, with a licentiate in the poetry of the National Literature Prize winner Miguel Fernández, a Melillan author to whom she has dedicated two books. Her doctoral thesis, defended in 1987 and published by Rodopi in 1998, consists of a description of the Spanish fascist aesthetic system and the analysis of its progressive dissolution in postwar literary criticism. Specializing in literary theory, she has written books such as Introducción a la historia de las teorías literarias (1991) and Teoría de la literatura y de la interpretación literaria (2008).

In 1995 she began a line of research on the theater of García Lorca, a subject on which she continues to work today. In 1995 her book Lenguaje y literatura was released, in which she talks with the main representatives of the linguistic turn and hermeneutic skepticism. In 2000 she presented her hypothesis on the innocence of Josef K. in The Trial, which she developed extensively in the book Kafka y la tragedia judía (2003). The hermeneutic discussion contained in this book is continued in more recent publications such as El problema de la interpretación literaria. Fuentes y bases teóricas para una hermenéutica constructiva (2009) and Perspectivas actuales de hermenéutica literaria. Para otra ética de la interpretación (2014).

In 1992 Wahnón entered the field of Cultural and Jewish Studies with a work on the Hebrew poetics of Moses ibn Ezra, and another on the role of the Wandering Jew in One Hundred Years of Solitude. Beginning in 1995, within the framework of the research project Philosophy After the Holocaust, she began a line of research on thought and literature of the Shoah, for which she authored papers on Hannah Arendt and Elias Canetti, and the monograph that she coordinated with Reyes Mate for the journal Anthropos. Her most recent work in this line, from 2010, deals with the images of the Holocaust in post-war Spanish poetry. In this same period she participated in debates on anti-Zionism and antisemitism.

From 2006 to 2007 she contributed to the national newspaper ABC with a series of articles on the Palestinian-Israeli conflict. In recent years she has continued to develop this critical activity in some articles on the current university model. In 2014 she published En fuga irrevocable. Un ensayo de crítica de la cultura, which deals with textual proliferation in the cultural and university spheres.

She has dedicated several articles and reviews to contemporary poets and narrators, including Iris M. Zavala, Luis García Montero, José Gutiérrez, Miguel d'Ors, Inmaculada Mengíbar, Gregorio Morales, Francisco Díaz de Castro, Rosa Regàs, and Jacinto López Gorgé.

== Professional career ==
In 1977 Wahnón began her studies in Hispanic Philology at the University of Granada, where she has developed most of her professional and teaching activities. In 1990, she obtained a position as professor of the Department of General Linguistics and Literary Theory. In 2003 she directed the Instituto Cervantes of Utrecht. In 2004 she obtained the chair of Literary Theory and Comparative Literature. From 2008 to 2011 she directed Afinidades. Revista de literatura y pensamiento, a publication of comparative and pro-European character. In 2009 she was elected president of the Spanish Association of Literary Theory (ASETEL), a position she held until 2013. During her presidency, the association's First International Congress was held. In March 2010 she took office as a member of the Academia de Buenas Letras de Granada, with the reading of El campo y las cenizas. Imágenes del Holocausto en la poesía española de posguerra.

== Books ==
- Wahnón, Sultana (1983). El irracionalismo en la poesía de Miguel Fernández (in Spanish). Antonio Ubago Editor. ISBN 9788485551279.
- Wahnón, Sultana (1987). Estética y crítica literarias en España (1940–1950) (in Spanish). Granada: EUG.
- Wahnón, Sultana (1991). Saber literario y hermenéutica: en defensa de la interpretación (in Spanish). Granada: EUG. ISBN 9788433813602.
- Wahnón, Sultana (1991). Introducción a la historia de las teorías literarias (in Spanish). Granada: EUG. ISBN 9788433813022.
- Wahnón, Sultana (1995). Lenguaje y literatura (in Spanish). Barcelona: Octaedro. ISBN 9788480631006.
- Wahnón, Sultana (1997). Wahnón Bensusan, Sultana; Rosales, José Carlos (eds.). Luis Rosales, poeta y crítico (in Spanish). Granada: Diputación Provincial de Granada. ISBN 9788478071852.
- Wahnón, Sultana (1998). Poesía y poética de Miguel Fernández (in Spanish). Madrid: UNED.
- Wahnón, Sultana (1998). La estética literaria de la posguerra: del fascismo a la vanguardia (in Spanish). Amsterdam: Rodopi. ISBN 9789042006539.
- Wahnón, Sultana (2003). Kafka y la tragedia judía (in Spanish). Barcelona: Riopiedras. ISBN 9788472131668.
- Wahnón, Sultana (2008). Teoría de la literatura y de la interpretación literaria: ensayos y reflexiones (in Spanish). Vigo: Academia del Hispanismo. ISBN 9788496915282.
- Wahnón, Sultana (2009). Wahnón Bensusan, Sultana (ed.). El problema de la interpretación literaria: fuentes y bases teóricas para una hermenéutica constructiva (in Spanish). Vigo: Academia del Hispanismo.
- Wahnón, Sultana (2014). En fuga irrevocable (in Spanish). Granada: Alhulia. ISBN 9788415897569.
- Wahnón, Sultana (2014). Wahnón Bensusan, Sultana (ed.). Perspectivas actuales de hermenéutica literaria: para otra ética de la interpretación (in Spanish). Granada: EUG.
