= Muelle =

Spanish graffiti artist

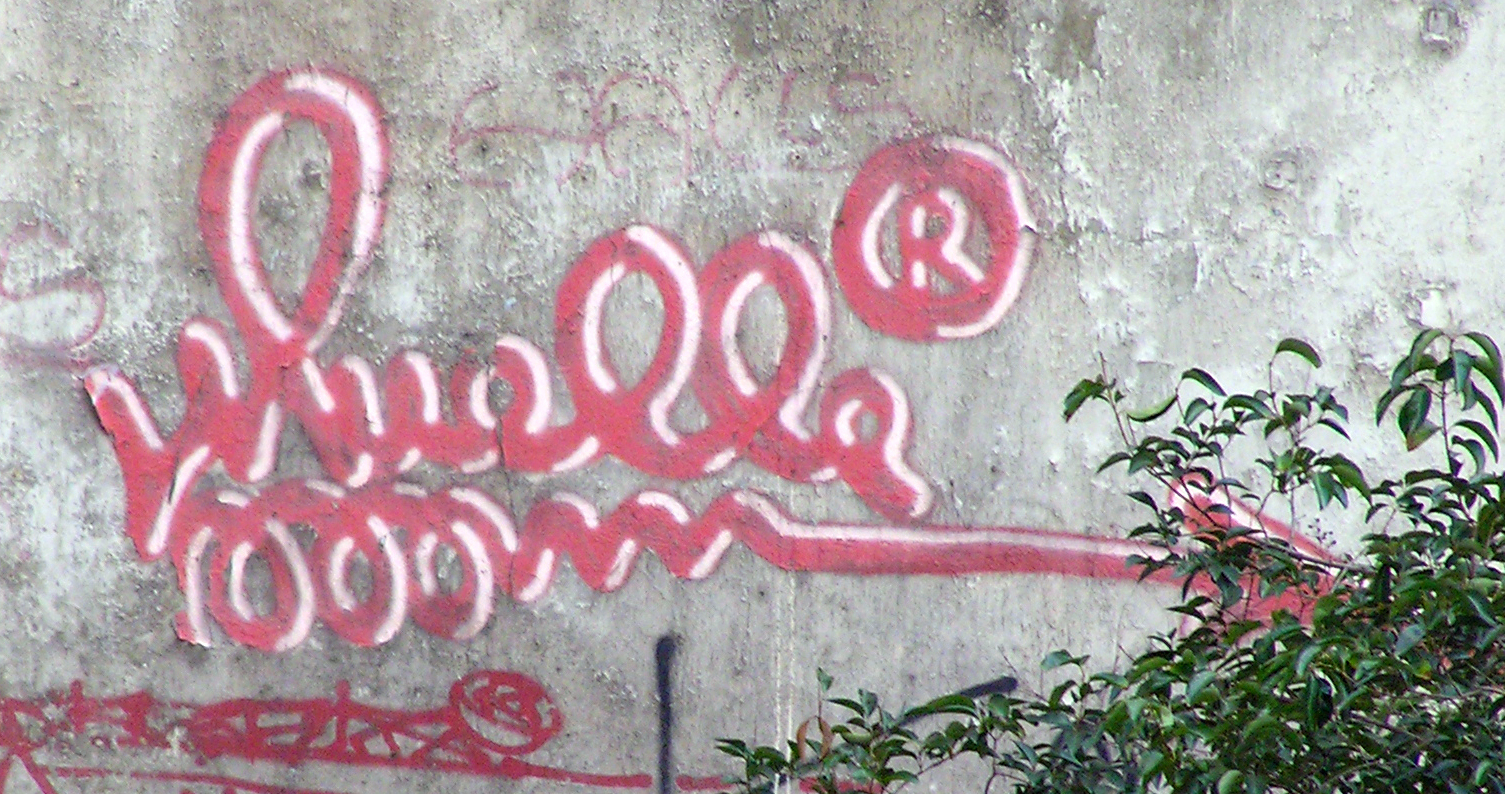
- A restored Muelle tag on the Calle de la Montera
- Born: Juan Carlos Argüello; 23 September 1965; Madrid, Spain
- Died: 1 July 1995 (aged 29); Spain
- Known for: First Spanish graffiti artist
- Style: Flechero
- Movement: La Movida Madrileña
- Memorials: Commemorative plaque at 2 La calle de Carazo, Madrid; Plaza Juan Carlos Argüello "MUELLE"; Madrid named in his honour
- Website: muelleart.com/en

Juan Carlos Argüello (23 September 1965 - 1 July 1995), known as Muelle [ˈmwe.ʝe], was a Spanish graffiti artist from Campamento, Madrid.

== Career ==
Around 1980, during La Movida Madrileña, Argüello started reproducing the tag he had designed on walls and public spaces of Madrid. It consisted of the word muelle, (Spanish for "spring"), or an R with an enclosing circle (®) and a line in the shape of a coiled spring ending in an arrowhead. At first, he used an ink marker and later spraypainted his signature extensively around Madrid (and to a lesser extent, in other Spanish localities). In the eighties, he improved his technique, using several colours in a technique labelled relleno, wider borders known as grosor, and 3-D effects.

== Influence ==
His innovative style, along with the profusion of his tags, made his work popular. Many other Madrilenian youths, known as flecheros created their own tags inspired by Muelle's, often ending strokes with arrowheads (flechas). The flechero scene developed at a time of cultural isolation, its practitioners being largely unaware of graffiti in the New York style. The spread of hip-hop culture in Spain in the late 1980s introduced the new graffiti styles developed in the United States. But, variations in Muelle's work basically kept his original design. Argüello appeared on Spanish television and in newspapers.

== Death ==
Argüello died of liver cancer on 1 July 1995 at the age of 29. His obituary appeared in El País.

== Legacy ==
In 2022, the Spanish graffiti brand Montana Colors released a special edition aerosol can featuring Muelle's tag alongside a short documentary about him.

At the behest of local PSOE politicians a tag of Argüello‘s in La Latina, threatened with obliteration by building renovations, was officially protected by the Government of the Community of Madrid in 2024.

== See also ==
- Akim Hoste
