= La buena vida =

La buena vida may refer to:

- La Buena Vida, an indie pop group from San Sebastián, Spain
- La Buena Vida (song), a song by Camila Cabello, from the album Familia
- The Good Life (2008 film), a 2008 Chilean drama film
- The Good Life (1996 film), a 1996 Spanish comedy film
