= Santiago Auserón =

Spanish singer and lyricist (born 1954)

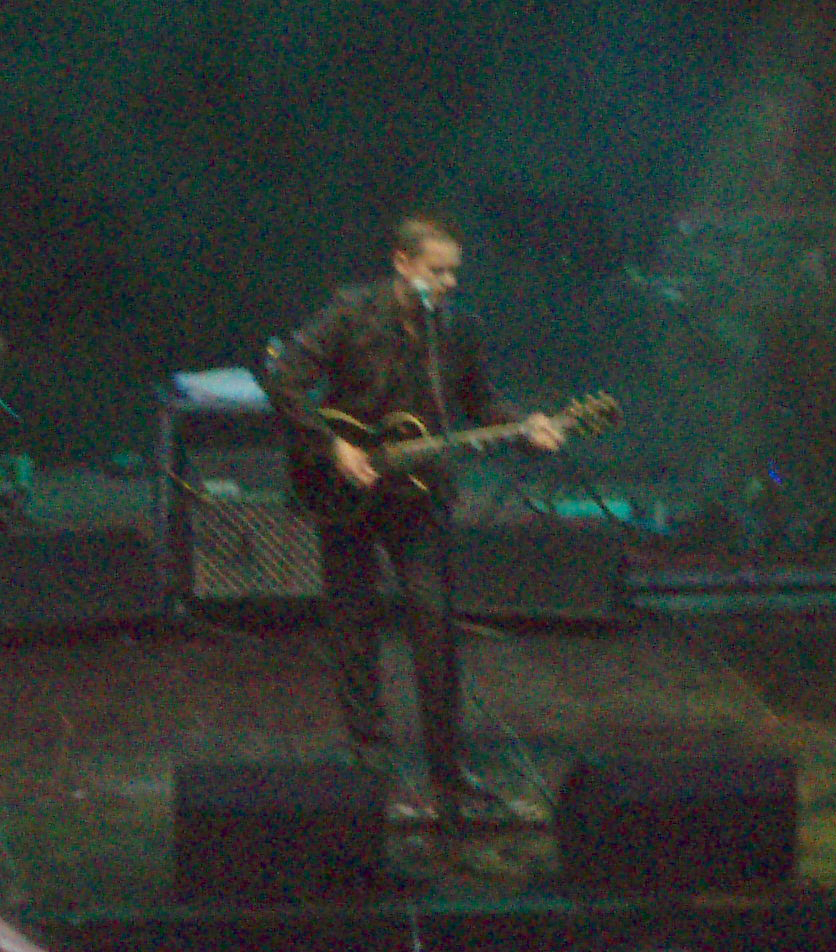
Juan Perro in a concert in 2006

Santiago Auserón, also known as Juan Perro (July 25, 1954 in Zaragoza, Aragon) is a Spanish singer and lyricist. He was songwriter and vocalist of Spanish rock's Radio Futura. Auserón has been recognized with the Aragón Music Prize for Career Trajectory in 2017, Cubadisco Prize for the Best International Album in 2017 and Aragón Music Prize for the Best Soloist 2019.

From 1972 to 1977 he attended the University of Madrid where he studied philosophy. After that he attended the University of Vincennes in Saint-Denis, Paris, where he stayed one year.

In 1979, Auserón founded Radio Futura, being part of the Madrilenian scene (Spanish: Movida Madrileña).

In 1992, he left the group and started his career as a soloist under his pseudonym of latin-rock "Juan Perro" and helped rediscovery Compay Segundo and the Music of Cuba in Spain before Ry Cooder's Buena Vista Social Club project.

== Discography ==
=== Radio Futura ===
- Música moderna (1980, Hispavox)
- La estatua del jardín botánico / Rompeolas (1982, single. Hispavox)
- Dance usted / Tus pasos (instrumental) (1983, single. Hispavox)
- La ley del desierto / La ley del mar (1984, Ariola)
- De un país en llamas (1985, Ariola)
- La canción de Juan Perro (1987, Ariola)
- Escueladecalor. El directo de Radio Futura (1989, BMG Ariola). (In live)
- Veneno en la piel (1990, BMG Ariola)
- Tierra para bailar (1991, BMG Ariola)

=== As soloist ===
- Raíces al viento (1995, Animal Tour/BMG-Ariola)
- La huella sonora (1997, Nueva Sociedad Lírica/BMG Music Spain)
- Mr. Hambre (2000, Nueva Sociedad Lírica/La Huella Sonora)
- Cantares de vela (2002, Nueva Sociedad Lírica/Animal Musik/La Huella Sonora)
- Río Negro (2011, Nueva Sociedad Lírica/La Huella Sonora).
