= Elefant Records =

Spanish independent record label

- Founded: 1989; 37 years ago
- Founder: Luis Calvo
- Genre: Indie pop, Indie, Synthpop
- Country of origin: Spain
- Location: Las Rozas, Madrid
- Official website: www.elefant.com

Elefant Records is an independent record label based in Madrid, Spain.

== History ==
Elefant Records was founded in 1989 by Luis Calvo as an offshoot of a fanzine he produced called "La Línea del Arco". In 2014, the label's 25th anniversary was celebrated with the launch of its entire catalog on the Bandcamp platform.

== Notable artists ==
- Attic Lights
- Aventuras de Kirlian
- BMX Bandits
- Camera Obscura
- Carlos Berlanga
- Family
- Go Kart Mozart
- Heavenly
- Helen Love
- Jupiter Apple
- La Casa Azul
- Le Mans
- Los Flechazos
- Lucky Soul
- Mirafiori
- My Little Airport
- Nick Garrie
- Nosoträsh
- Quickspace
- Stereo Total
- Television Personalities
- Tender Trap
- The Clientele
- The Frank and Walters
- The Primitives
- The School
- Trembling Blue Stars

== See also ==
- List of record labels
