= Spanish society after the democratic transition =

Period after the late 1970s

After the restoration of democracy in the late 1970s, the changes in everyday Spanish life were as radical as the political transformation. They are famously known as La Movida (The Movement). These changes were even more striking when contrasted with the values and social practices that had prevailed in Spanish society during the Francoist regime, especially during the 1940s and the 1950s. In essence, Spanish social values and attitudes were modernized at the same pace, and to the same degree, as the country's class structure, economic institutions, and political framework.

Under the rule of Francisco Franco, dominant Spanish social values were strongly conservative. Both public laws and church regulations enforced a set of social structures aimed at preserving the traditional role of the family, distant and formal relations between the sexes, and controls over expression in the press, film, and the mass media, as well as over many other important social institutions. By the 1960s, however, social values were changing faster than the law, inevitably creating tension between legal codes and reality. Even the Catholic church had begun to move away from its more conservative positions by the latter part of the decade. The government responded haltingly to these changes with some new cabinet appointments and with somewhat softer restrictions on the media. Yet underneath these superficial changes, Spanish society was experiencing wrenching changes as its people came increasingly into contact with the outside world. To some extent, these changes were due to the rural exodus that had uprooted hundreds of thousands of Spaniards and had brought them into new urban social settings. In the 1960s and the 1970s, however, two other contacts were also important: the flow of European tourists to "sunny Spain" and the migration of Spain's workers to jobs in France, Switzerland, and Germany.

== Contraception and abortion ==
During the Francisco Franco years, the ban on the sale of contraceptives was complete and rigid at least in theory, even though the introduction of the combined oral contraceptive pill had brought contraception to at least half a million Spanish women by 1975. The ban on the sale of contraceptives was lifted in 1978, but no steps were taken to ensure that they were used safely or effectively. Schools offered no sex education courses, and family planning centers existed only where local authorities were willing to pay for them. The consequence of a loosening of sexual restraints, combined with a high level of ignorance about the technology that could be substituted in their place, was a rise in the number of unwanted pregnancies, which led to the second policy problem: abortion.

Illegal abortions were fairly commonplace in Spain even under the dictatorship. A 1974 government report estimated that there were about 300,000 such abortions each year. Subsequently, the number rose to about 350,000 annually, which gave Spain one of the highest ratios of abortions to live births among advanced industrial countries. Abortion continued to be illegal in Spain until 1985, three years after the Spanish Socialist Workers' Party (Partido Socialista Obrero Español or PSOE) came to power on an electoral platform that promised a change. Even so, the law legalized abortions only in certain cases. In the Organic Law 9/1985, adopted on July 5, 1985, induced abortion was legalized in three cases: serious risk to physical or mental health of the pregnant woman, rape and malformations or defects, physical or mental, in the fetus. Eventually, abortion laws were further liberalized in 2010, to allow physicians to provide elective abortions during the first trimester. (see Abortion in Spain).

== Role of women ==
Perhaps the most significant change in Spanish social values, however, was the role of women in society, which, in turn, was related to the nature of the family. Spanish society, for centuries, had embraced a code of moral values that established stringent standards of sexual conduct for women (but not for men); restricted the opportunities for professional careers for women, but honored their role as wives and (most important) mothers; and prohibited divorce, contraception, and abortion, but permitted prostitution.

After the return of democracy, the change in the status of women was dramatic. One significant indicator was the changing place of women in the work force. In the traditional Spanish world, women rarely entered the job market. By the late 1970s, however, 22 percent of the country's adult women, still somewhat fewer than in Italy and in Ireland, had entered the work force. By 1984 this figure had increased to 33 percent, a level not significantly different from Italy or the Netherlands. Women still made up less than one-third of the total labor force, however, and in some important sectors, such as banking, the figure was closer to one-tenth. A 1977 opinion poll revealed that when asked whether a woman's place was in the home only 22 percent of young people in Spain agreed, compared with 26 percent in Britain, 30 percent in Italy, and 37 percent in France. The principal barrier to women in the work place, however, was not public opinion, but rather such factors as a high unemployment rate and a lack of part-time jobs. In education, women were rapidly achieving parity with men, at least statistically. In 1983, approximately 46 percent of Spain's university enrollment was female, the thirty-first highest percentage in the world, and comparable to most other European countries.

During Franco's years, Spanish law discriminated strongly against married women. Without her husband's approval, referred to as the permiso marital, a wife was prohibited from almost all economic activities, including employment, ownership of property, or even travel away from home. The law also provided for less stringent definitions of such crimes as adultery and desertion for husbands than it did for wives. Significant reforms of this system were begun shortly before Franco's death, and they have continued at a rapid pace since then. The permiso marital was abolished in 1975; laws against adultery were cancelled in 1978; and divorce was legalized in 1981. During the same year, the parts of the civil code that dealt with family finances were also reformed.

During the Franco years, marriages had to be canonical (that is, performed under Roman Catholic law and regulations) if even one of the partners was Catholic, which meant effectively that all marriages in Spain had to be sanctioned by the church. Since the church prohibited divorce, a marriage could be dissolved only through the arduous procedure of annulment, which was available only after a lengthy series of administrative steps and was thus accessible only to the relatively wealthy and was only applicable if the marriage was invalid to begin with. These restrictions were probably one of the major reasons for a 1975 survey result showing that 71 percent of Spaniards favored legalizing divorce; however, because the government remained in the hands of conservatives until 1982, progress toward a divorce law was slow and full of conflict. In the summer of 1981, the Congress of Deputies (lower chamber of the Cortes Generales, or Spanish Parliament) finally approved a divorce law with the votes of about thirty Union of the Democratic Center (Union de Centro Democratico or UCD) deputies who defied the instructions of party conservatives. As a consequence, Spain had a divorce law that permitted the termination of a marriage in as little as two years following the legal separation of the partners. Still, it would be an exaggeration to say that the new divorce law opened a floodgate for the termination of marriages. Between the time the law went into effect at the beginning of September 1981, and the end of 1984, only slightly more than 69,000 couples had availed themselves of the option of ending their marriages, and the number declined in both 1983 and 1984. There were already more divorced people than this in Spain in 1981 before the law took effect.

Despite these important gains, observers expected that the gaining of equal rights for women would be a lengthy struggle, waged on many different fronts. It was not until deciding a 1987 case, for example, that Spain's Supreme Court held that a rape victim need not prove that she had fought to defend herself in order to verify the truth of her allegation. Until that important court case, it was generally accepted that a female rape victim, unlike the victims of other crimes, had to show that she had put up "heroic resistance" in order to prove that she had not enticed the rapist or otherwise encouraged him to attack her.

In recent years, the role of women has largely increased in Spain, especially in politics but also in the labor market and other public areas. New laws have officially eliminated all kinds of discrimination, and are even perceived by some as positive discrimination, but a conservative part of the society is still ingrained in the macho culture. Anyway, Spanish women are quickly approaching their European counterparts, and the younger generations perceive machismo as outdated.

Currently, Spain has one of the lowest birth and fertility rates in the world, up to the point of heavily hampering the population replacement rates. One or two children families are pretty common, and the age of parents has been increasing.

== Sociopolitical and religious views ==
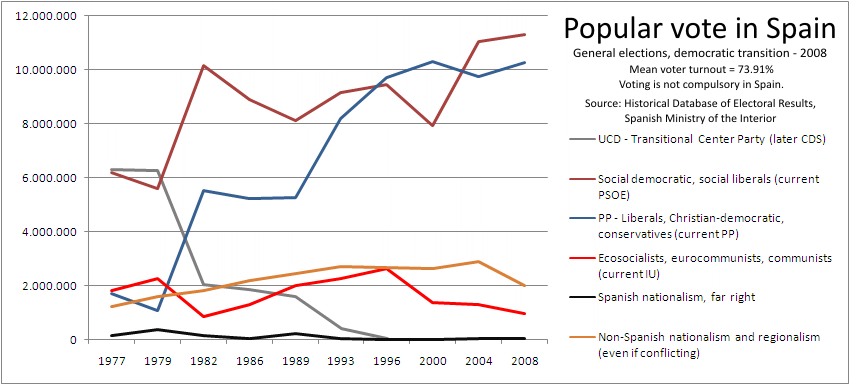
Evolution of the popular vote in Spanish General Elections from the democratic transition until 2008. Voter turnout is usually high.

After 36 years of theoconservative National-Catholic Francoism, Spanish society as a whole has consistently shown a secular, left-leaning trend. Over a period of 40 years of liberal democracy, the social democratic Spanish Socialist Workers' Party (PSOE) spent 21 years in office, although the conservative People's Party (PP) has since then steadily grown and has recently governed for eight years. Large regions as Andalusia or Extremadura have had PSOE regional governments since democracy was re-established in the country. Ecosocialist-Eurocommunist United Left has traditionally been the distant fourth political force in Spain, and recently has further lost some of its presence and representation. As a result of the overexploitation of national symbols and references by the Francoist regime, patriotism is not ingrained in Spanish society. Nationalisms and regionalisms are strong in spite of the high decentralization of the Spanish state, especially in Catalonia and in the Basque country.

While Roman Catholicism remains the largest nominal religion in Spain, most Spaniards - especially the younger ones — choose to ignore the Catholic teachings in morals, politics or sexuality, and don't attend Mass regularly. Agnosticism and atheism enjoy social prestige, in accordance with general secularization trends in Western Europe. Other religions like Christian Protestantism or Islam are on the rise, but only linked to the increase of immigrant population from poor Muslim (Arab countries of North Africa, Middle East, Asia) or Christian majority (Latin America, Caribbean, Sub-Saharan Africa, Central America, Philippines etc.) countries and the large acceptance of Evangelism among the Romani people. Culture wars are far more related to politics than to religion, and the huge lack of popularity of typically religion-related issues like creationism prevent them from being used in such conflicts. Revivalist efforts by the Roman Catholic Church and other creeds have not had any significant success outside their previous sphere of influence.

According to the Eurobarometer 69 (2008), only 6% of Spaniards consider religion as one of their three most important values, while the European mean is 7%.

Spanish society is considered one of the most culturally liberal and LGBT-friendly countries in the world, with 84% of Spaniards in 2015 believing that same-sex marriage should be allowed throughout Europe. The 2019 Eurobarometer showed that 91% of Spaniards believed gay and bisexual people should enjoy the same rights as heterosexual people, and 82% supported same-sex marriage.

Spain became the third country in the world to legalize same-sex marriage on 2005, and in June 2021, it became the sixth country to make euthanasia legal nationwide, with public support over 70%.

== See also ==
- Movida viguesa
- Spanish transition to democracy
