= Quantum aesthetics =

Cultural movement

Quantum Aesthetics is a movement that was inaugurated by Gregorio Morales at the end of the 1990s with his work “El cadaver de Balzac” or Balzac's Corpse (1998). Here he defined the objectives of the movement in the phrase “mystery and difference”.

Later the Quantum Aesthetics Group arose, formed by novelists, poets, painters, photographers, film producers, models... Gregorio Morales has applied these aesthetics not only to his novels, such as “Nómadas del Tiempo” or Nomads of Time (2005), but also to his poetry books such as “Canto Cuántico” or Quantum Song (2003). Here he enters emotively into the world of subatomic physics and the human mind. Other known artists in this movement are the painter Xaverio, the poets Francisco Plata and Miguel Ángel Contreras, the film director Julio Medem and the North American musician Lawrence Axerold.

== See also ==
- Quantum singularity (fiction)
