= Carlos Berlanga =

Spanish musician, composer and painter

- Born: Carlos García Berlanga; 11 August 1959; Madrid, Spain
- Died: 5 June 2002 (aged 42) Madrid, Spain, buried: Cementerio de Pozuelo de Alarcón, Madrid, Spain
- Genres: Pop; synthpop; pop rock
- Instruments: Vocals; guitar; synthesizer
- Labels: Elefant Records
- Formerly of: Alaska y Dinarama; Alaska y los Pegamoides; Kaka de Luxe

Carlos Berlanga, born Carlos García Berlanga, (11 August 1959 – 5 June 2002) was a Spanish musician, composer and painter.

Berlanga was born in Madrid, Spain. He died in Madrid at the age of 42 of liver cancer.

He was an influential figure in the Spanish music scene of the 1980s, especially in his various collaborations with the singer Alaska, such as Alaska y Dinarama and Alaska y los Pegamoides. He was the son of Luis García Berlanga, a Spanish film director.
