= La Buena Vida =

Spanish indie pop group

- Origin: San Sebastián, Spain
- Genres: Indie pop indie rock Twee pop alternative rock
- Years active: 1988–present
- Labels: Siesta; Sinnamon
- Members: Irantzu Valencia; Mikel Aguirre; Pedro San Martín; Javier Sánchez; Raúl Sebastián; José Luis Lanzagorta

La Buena Vida (lit. 'The Good Life') is a Spanish indie pop group from San Sebastián, Spain. The band was formed in 1988 and continues to make music as of today. They have recorded 7 albums and 14 EPs. Their music is a form of pop also known as the Donosti Sound, a 1990s indie pop movement in San Sebastián.

== Biography ==
The band's career can be divided into two stages. Initially, their music bore many similarities in sound and attitude with groups known as "twee pop", in particular those of the legendary UK label Sarah Records and of their countrymen Aventuras de Kirlian. They were also influenced by pop music of the late 1960s like Love, The Beatles, The Beach Boys, The Velvet Underground, Honeybus, Pic Nic and Vainica Doble, with touches of bossa nova and soul. They have also recognized the influence of French chanson (Serge Gainsbourg and Françoise Hardy). Their lyrics in this first stage reflect everyday life situations, as well as the feelings and concerns of average kids of their age (approximately 18) using a melancholy and evocative but natural tone.

Their second stage began with the LP Soidemersol (1997). Parting from their usual influences while keeping their own personality, they began to use complex orchestral arrangements in their songs. Their lyrics also began to mature, reflecting more complex sentiments and often being much more bitter and less innocent than before.

== Members ==
- Irantzu Valencia (vocals)
- Mikel Aguirre (vocals and guitar)
- Pedro San Martín (bass)
- Javier Sánchez (guitar)
- Raúl Sebastián (drums)
- José Luis Lanzagorta (keyboard)

Borja Sanchez, founder of the group and lead guitarist, left the group after the album Soidemersol. On February 17 of 2009, the departure of Irantzu Valencia, the group's main singer for the last 15 years, was announced via the band's website. Pedro San Martin (Bass) died on May 14, 2011. The musician who was 39 years old had a car accident after a concert in Burgos (Spain).

== Discography ==
=== Albums ===
- La Buena Vida (Siesta, 1992)
- La Buena Vida (Siesta, 1994) (known by fans as "Los mejores momentos", the title of the album's first song)
- Soidemersol (Siesta, 1997)
- Panorama (Siesta, 1999)
- Hallelujah! (Siesta, 2001)
- Álbum (Sinnamon, 2003)
- Vidania (Sinnamon, 2006)
- Sencillos (Siesta, 2007) (collection of singles and rarities)

=== Singles and EPs ===
- La Buena Vida (Siesta, 1992)
- La Buena Vida (Siesta, 1994)
- Magnesia (Siesta, 1995)
- Pacífico (Siesta, 1997)
- Desde Hoy en Adelante (Siesta, 1997)
- Tormenta en la Mañana (Siesta, 1999)
- Eureka (Siesta, 2000)
- Qué nos va a pasar (Siesta, 2001)
- Harmónica (Siesta, 2002)
- Los Planetas (Sinnamon, 2003)
- Desde Aquí (Sinnamon, 2003)
- Un Actor Mejicano (Sinnamon, 2003)
- hh-mm-ss (Sinnamon, 2004)
- La Mitad de Nuestras Vidas (Sinnamon, 2006)
- Viaje Por Países Pequeños (El Volcán, 2009)
