= Aventuras de Kirlian =

Spanish indie rock band

- Origin: San Sebastián, Spain
- Genres: Indie rock Alternative rock
- Years active: 1986–1989
- Labels: Elefant Records; Dro Records
- Members: Jone Gabarain; Teresa Iturrioz; Ibon Errazkin; Peru Izeta

Aventuras de Kirlian was a Spanish indie rock band in the 1980s. Although they experienced only moderate commercial success, they achieved a significant cult following in the Basque country, and their music has been a major influence on many Spanish bands of the 1990s. The band dissolved in 1989 and the members teamed up with drummer Gorka Ochoa to form a new group under the name of Le Mans.

== History ==
The core of the band was formed by Ibon Errazkin and Teresa Iturrioz, who began to jam together in the summer of 1985, both initially playing bass guitar. In February 1986, Jone Gabarain and Peru Izeta came on board and together they formed the group under the name Aventuras de Kirlian.

Their influences include Tamla Motown, Marine Girls, early Talking Heads, and the Spanish band Décima Víctima.

Between 1986 and 1988, Aventuras de Kirlian performed approximately fifteen times, exclusively in the province of Gipuzkoa. They frequently shared the stage with other local groups such as La Insidia, which would later become Family, indicating their active role and growing popularity in the Basque music scene at the time.

The band was closely associated with the Donosti Sound, a musical movement centered in San Sebastián that drew inspiration from British indie pop and shaped the identity of alternative music in the Basque Country during the late 1980s and early 1990s.

Aventuras de Kirlian disbanded in 1989. Shortly thereafter, its members regrouped and, joined by drummer Gorka Ochoa, formed a new band named Le Mans. The new group debuted in 1993 and continued to develop the introspective pop style associated with the Donosti Sound.

== Influence and legacy ==
Aventuras de Kirlian played a foundational role in the development of the Donosti Sound and influenced later Basque groups such as Family, Le Mans, and La Buena Vida. Their minimalist arrangements and introspective lyrics, influenced by British bands like Felt and Marine Girls, distinguished them from other Spanish groups of the era and resonated with local audiences seeking more delicate, introspective pop.

In 2022, the label Discos Madmua released Hiru Izar, a 7-inch vinyl single that includes the only known track by Aventuras de Kirlian sung in the Basque language. The release was significant for highlighting the band's connection to Basque cultural identity and renewing interest in their musical legacy decades after their initial disbandment.

== Line-up ==
- Jone Gabarain - vocals
- Teresa Iturrioz - bass
- Ibon Errazkin - guitar
- Peru Izeta - drums, guitar

== Discography ==
=== Albums ===
- Aventuras de Kirlian (Dro, 1989)
- 1986-1988 (Elefant, 2001)

=== Singles ===
- Víctor (Dro, 1989)
- Un día gris (Dro, 1989)
