= Akim Hoste =

Spanish street artist

- Born: 1981 (age 44–45); Barcelona, Spain
- Other names: Akim Graff, KYN
- Known for: Street artist
- Notable work: Association Espíritu Libre

KYN or Akim Graff (born 1981) is a Spanish street artist, currently living in Los Angeles. His work has been exhibited in Europe, the United States, and Morocco. He is the founder of a non-profit art therapy organization and is a regular volunteer with children.

== Early career ==
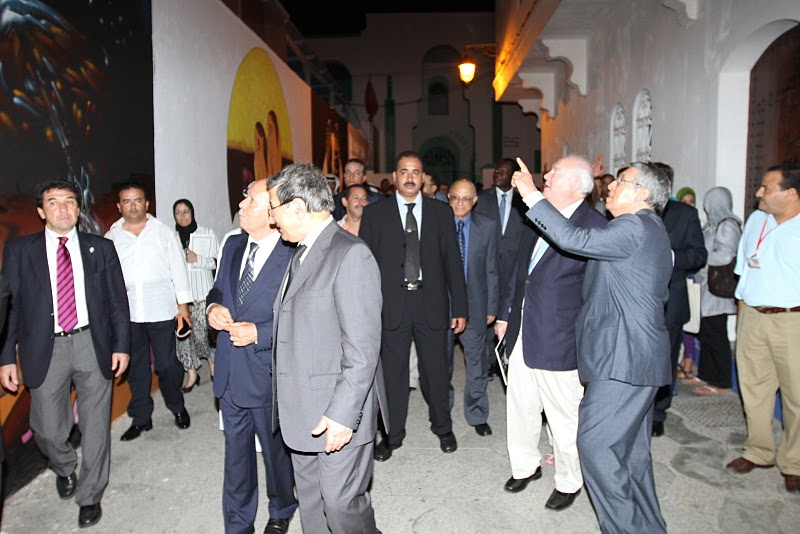
All the dignitaries presents in front KYN 's Wall Paint, in special Mr.Benaïssa and Mr.Moratinos, in inauguration of the 32 Festival International Forum Cultural of Assilah

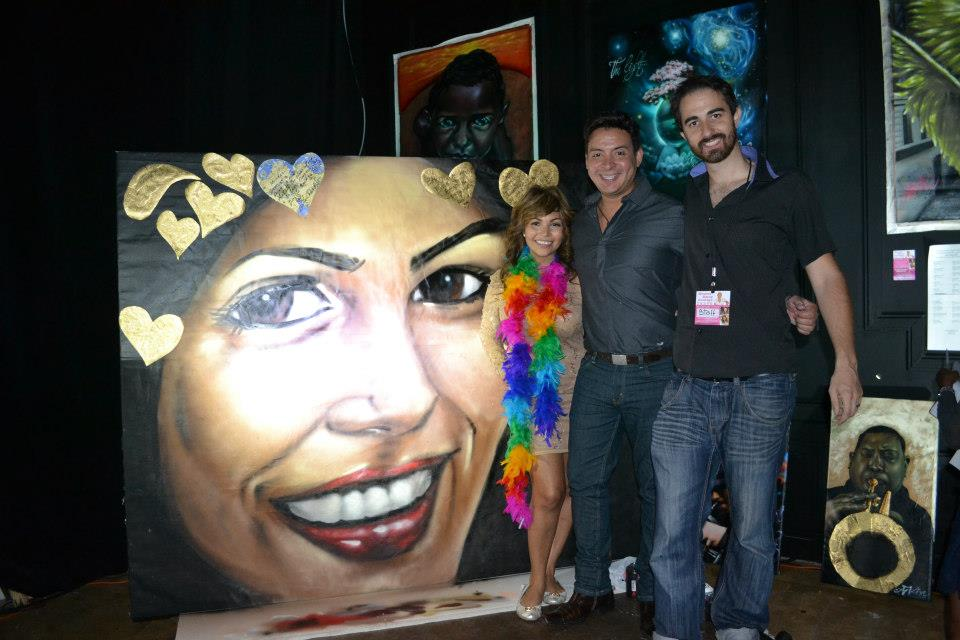
beneficial act organized by Hair for Angel with Richard Villasmil to Zhayr Ortiz with a live performance by Akim Graff.

Born in 1981 in Barcelona, Spain, Graff started his artistic career as a graffiti writer in the early 1990s. He has since painted throughout Europe and has won some graffiti competitions, including three 1st prizes in special competitions of Graffiti.

KYN is a licensed Art therapist. He is the founder of a non-profit “c” launched in 2008. He also works in several special centers: City Hall of Tarragona, “Hospital Joan XXIII”, “Hospital Vall d’Hebron,” as a volunteer with children with special needs. He uses Chromotherapy to facilitate the children's release of emotional states and internal locks.

He uses different materials and colors for his paintings as a great tool of expression. Furthermore, he also does plasma mixing techniques.

His extensive experience with sprays capture the Sketch, capturing realism and expression of every face perfectly. Inspired by design and open places, KYN created a new concept for the graffiti. He makes the design a conceptual part of the piece he is working on, leaving it as a piece fresh and floating in a new concept. The background of the piece is not secondary, it creates depth and gives more force as a whole.

== Exhibitions ==
The first most important solo exhibition of KYN was entitled "a new vision of the Christmas." It took over the famous gallery "Torre Vella de Salou" and generated interest from mass media, like TV3 (Catalonia), Tac12, print media like El Punt and radio.

In 2009 he was selected for the 32º Festival International Cultural of Forum Asilah. Honorable Mohamed Benaissa, with special guest EUA, attended the unveiling of a mural by Akim Graff, who completed the work in a few days and received positive feedback from both dignitaries and the public.

With art critics gaining interest in his work, as well as those of other urban artists, he began showing in international galleries as well. In 2013 he was invited during Art Basel Week in Miami, Florida.

He had murals at the Street Art International Art Fair, where 40,000 people came to view his work. He also showed works at Art Basel Week Miami.

He has collaborated with Richard Villasmil for Richards Touch's making an exhibition with Hair for Angel a Solidarity exhibition in the "Four Embassador" [sic] in Miami Brickell for "Todos por Zhayr".

== Wynwood - Miami ==
KYN was tasked with painting one of the trendier spaces in 2014, "The Hall of the arts", a cultural space with the more important theatrical productions of the moment in Miami. The main TV stations of Miami, Univision, Mira TV, America TV, Chic Magazine, etc. covered the opening and interviewed Akim Graff in every TV channel due to his abilities and his realism in the performance of his art in the "Hall of the Arts". KYN painharity Hed in one of the districts of high trendy of the arts in Miami, Wynwood. When he finalized his mural, he was interviewed by Danilo Carrera in a special program “El Camino” of Univision and Galavision where KYN finish in front of his mural with Danilo giving some advises about graffiti and invited the interviewer to try the sprays with his own hands.

== Special live exhibits ==
KYN has participated in several events with “Wall Brawl” in Miami Beach and Wynwood supporting Ronald McDonald Charity House, event covered by Javier Ceriani interviewing some of the artists and among them Akim Graff. His popularity is growing thanks to his exhibitions live and during the Art Basel Week in Spectrum 2015, where he was followed with all the visitors of the Fair Spectrum. The talent of KYN and the events where he has participated, opened the door to Camilo Egana of CNN, one of the most important TV chains internationally and with a big cultural prestige.

== Exhibitions and notable works ==
- LA ART SHOW 2019
- Exhibition. SPECTRUM MIAMI 2015. Spectrum 2015
- Exhibition Hangar Gallery Wynwood 2015
- Exhibition MRAF. Art Basel Week 2014 with MIIT (Museo di Italia di Torino)
- IBCA13. International Biennial of Contemporary Art. 33 Gallery in Chicago: Zhou Brother Foundation (EEUU) 2013
- Exhibition “Everyone for Zhayr” solidarity event in Four Embassador –Miami, Brickell (EEUU) 2012
- Exposition in Nina Torres Fine Art. Miami (EEUU) 2013
- Exhibition in Miami River Art Fair (2012) EEUU
- Exhibition in 8 edition ateliers opendoor in the downtown of Tarragona. 2011
- Exhibition in “Francoli” of Tarragona "murs per la Pau" (walls for peace). 2010
- Exhibition solidarity for the Hospital Joan XXIII of Tarragona. 2010
- Exhibition in “Peñiscola”-Castellón 2010
- Exposition in Museum Tarragona “Jazz in Canvas” (17 Festival International of Dixieland) 2010
- Tarragona (Catllar) in the Catllar City Hall 2010
- Exhibition in City Hall of Andorra (Andorra) 2010
- 32ème Moussem Cultural International d’Assilah. Contest International in Assilah (Marruecos). 2010
- Exhibition in 5 edition ateliers opendoor in the downtown of Tarragona. 2009
- Salou; “Torre Vella”: ”Exposition Art de Nadal” (Bethlehem in wall) Organized for the city hall of Salou by Akim. 2009
- Jazz in Canvas by Akim:
  - Sities Gallery in Barcelona (2008)
  - City Hall of Tarragona (2009)
  - Hotel SB of Tarragona (2009)
- Exhibition in Menorca (Arto).2008
- Exhibition in VidrArt Gallery (menorca).2008
- Exhibition in 3 edition ateliers opendoor in the downtown of Tarragona. 2007
- City Hall of Tarragona; Beneficial for “Asociación Espíritu Libre”.2007
- Exposition in Vendrell City Hall (Vendrell) 2005
- Exhibition in Boxtel (Netherlands). 2003
- Exhibition in Pineda de Mar- Dept of Culture 2001
- Exhibition “Urban Art”- Barcelona Young (Barcelona) 2000
- Exhibition “Street Art”- Lyon Art (Lyon) 2000
- Exhibition in Reus- Young Dept. 1999
