= Campamento (Madrid) =

Coordinates: 40°23′15″N 3°46′55″W

- City neighborhood
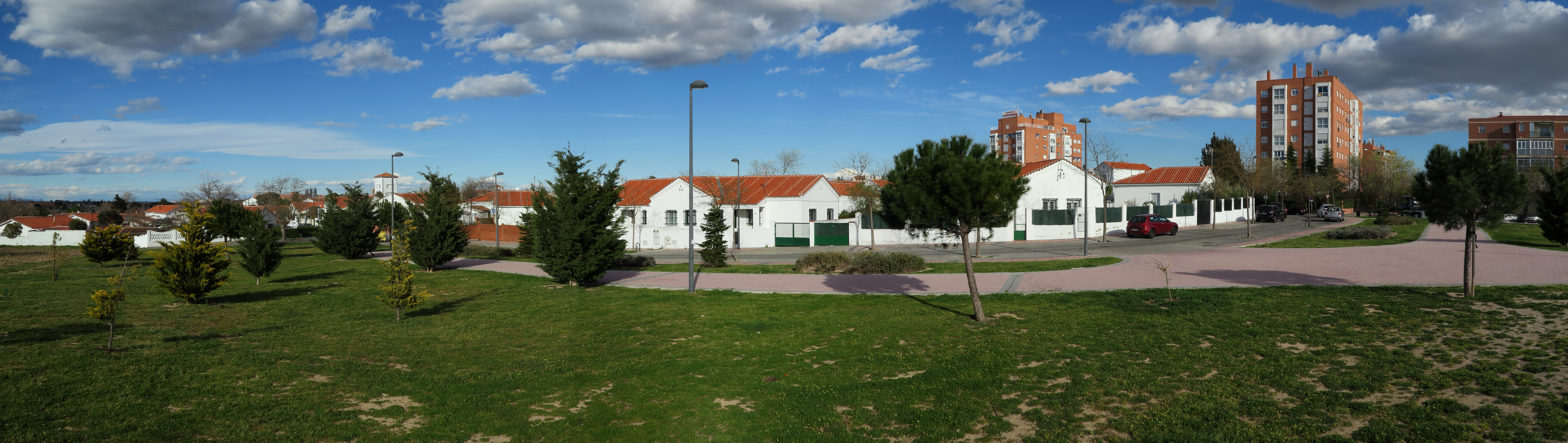
- Interactive map of Campamento
- Country: Spain
- Region: Community of Madrid
- Municipality: Madrid
- District: Latina

Campamento [kampaˈmento] is an administrative neighborhood (barrio) of Madrid belonging to the district of Latina.

== Notable people ==
- Muelle (1966–1995): Spanish graffiti pioneer
