= Gregorio Morales =

Spanish writer

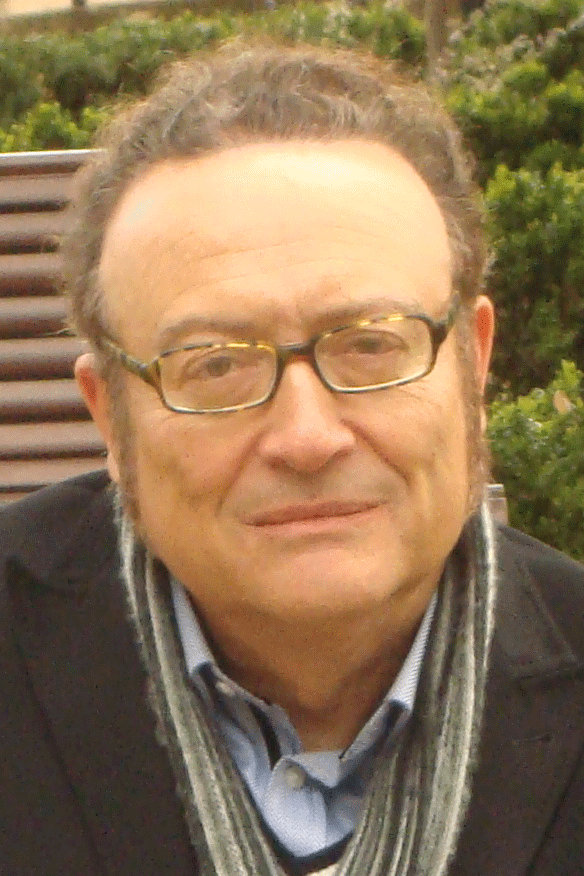
Gregorio Morales, 2013

Gregorio Morales (7 July 1952 – 22 June 2015), was a Spanish novelist.

Gregorio Morales represents a movement named quantum aesthetics that aims to look at human difficulties of all ages from a new perspective that solely derives from modern sciences such as particle physics, astronomy or psychology. In this way, Puerta del Sol (The Sun Door) (2002) is about love and genre violence. These themes are developed in a plot in which the boy representing the main character, faces the great assassin that he himself will be; and the adult murderer will face the little boy he was. These actions occur in a turbulent simultaneity of time and space. In Nómadas del Tiempo (Nomads of Time) (2005), Morales deals with the same problems, but this time inquires whether love is necessarily bound to age and space. He develops the story by having two couples travel to parallel dimensions, in which they change their ages and circumstances.

Although it may not seem so at first glance, quantum aesthetics has no relation with science fiction. The latter emphasizes different realities, while authors like Gregorio Morales are more interested in understanding humankind. This does not mean that they do not write about virtual worlds as in the case of Ptawardya in Morales’novel Nómadas del Tiempo (Nomads of Time).

Morales has also written essays, the most important of which is El Cadáver de Balzac (Balzac’s Corpse) (1998), in which – with respect to the great French novelist - Morales censures repetition and defends a new paradigm that will discover mystery to the readers making it a part of their daily lives. This book was basic for the foundation of The Quantum Aesthetics Movement, that spread throughout the world, and appeared in the United States of America as The World of Quantum Culture (2002), whose first chapter "Overcoming the Limit Syndrome", belongs to Morales. In the books Principio de incertidumbre (Uncertainty principle) (2003) and La isla del loco (The Island of the lunatic) (2005), the author goes deep into the chore and develops the ideas contained in El cadaver de Balzac. Morales cultivates and unites all the genres that transgress the habitual limits of humankind, in order to get to know and apprehend its nature. This is the reason why eroticism appears constantly in his works together with science and terror. In this way Morales has written El juego del viento y la luna (The wind and moon game) (1998), which is the only universal erotic anthology that has ever existed in Spanish; the book of tales called Erotica Sagrada (Sacred Eroticism) (1989) and the essay Por amor al deseo. Historia del erotismo (For the love of desire. The History of eroticism) (2006).

== Biography ==
Gregorio Morales was born in Granada (Spain) 7 July 1952. His childhood was marked by the assassination of his grandfather, the republican lord mayor of a little village of the Province of Granada, during the Spanish Civil War. He wrote his first narratives before the age of 10. He studied Roman Philology in the University of Granada. He worked as a waiter and later in his life he became a professor of Spanish literature. In 1982, he moved to Madrid where he introduced himself in the circle of The Belles Arts founding the "Tertulia de Creadores" that received the highest representants of La Movida Madrileña (The Madrilene movement) in the Spanish post-modern age. At this time he published his first novel Y Hesperia fue hecha (And Hesperia was done). In 1989 he published the novel that has been considered his masterpiece and one of the most relevant works in Spanish literature, La Cuarta Locura (The Fourth Madness). Antonio Muñoz Molina said that this novel was so dangerous that it could not be read with impunity. The dangers of the official culture made Morales take the initiative to found and to preside over, in 1994, The Saloon of Independents, integrated by 60 writers from all over the country. Many of the members of this saloon defended the New Aesthetic and they decided to call them 'quantum aesthetics'. El Cadaver de Balzac, that Morales published in 1998, is the manifest of this movement. In 1999, the Quantum Aesthetics Group was founded. At the beginning of the 21st century, Gregorio Morales published some of his most emblematic novels, such as La individuación (Individuation), Puerta del Sol (The Sun Door) and Nómadas del tiempo. At the same time, the polemic surrounding the quantum aesthetics grew. Gregorio Morales was a numeral member of La Academia de Buenas Letras de Granada. And he wrote a column in the local paper of Granada IDEAL. He was a compromised author and militant in the Republican Left in Spain.

== Works ==
- Y Hesperia fue hecha (1982)
- Puntos de vista (1986)
- Razón de amor (1987)
- La cuarta locura (1989)
- Erótica sagrada (1989)
- Cuentos de terror (Varios autores, 1989)
- El amor ausente (1990)
- El pecado del adivino (1992)
- El cadáver de Balzac (1998)
- El juego del viento y la luna. Antología de la literatura erótica (1998/1999)
- Ella. Él (1999)
- El devorador de sombras (relatos de suspense y terror) (2000)
- El mundo de la cultura cuántica (Varios autores, 2003)
- Puerta del Sol (2002)
- La individuación (2003)
- Principio de incertidumbre (2003)
- Canto cuántico (2003)
- Nómadas del tiempo (2005)
- La isla del loco Escritos sobre arte (2005)
- Quixote Erótico (El erotismo en el Quijote) (2005)
- El gigante de cristal. Textos sobre Granada (2005)
- Por amor al deseo. Historia del erotismo (2006)
