= Los Flechazos =

Spanish mod band

- Origin: León, Spain
- Genres: Pop, Garage, Beat
- Years active: 1986–1998
- Labels: Dro, Elefant, Fortune
- Past members: Alejandro Díez Garin (voice/guitar); Elena Iglesias Sastre (organ); José Berrot (harmonica/refrain); Héctor Escobar (bass guitar/refrain); Pedro Javier Alonso (drums)

Los Flechazos (Spanish for The Arrow Shots) were a Spanish mod band of the 1980s and 1990s whose musical style was strongly influenced by the sounds of British musical groups of the 1960s. Besides numerous original compositions, they also played several cover versions of other artists' songs, e.g. of the Rupert's People and Phil Spector. After twelve years, the group disbanded in 1998.

== Discography ==
- "Viviendo en la era pop", 1988 (Dro)
- "En el club", 1989 (Dro)
- "¡Preparados, listos, ya!", 1991 (Dro)
- "¡En acción!", 1992 (Dro)
- "El sorprendente sonido de Los Flechazos", 1993 (Dro)
- "Alta fidelidad", 1995 (Elefant)
- "Haciendo astillas el reloj", 1996 (Dro)
- "Dias grises", 1996 (Elefant)
- "Pussycat", 1996 (Fortune; live album of the Beat-O-Mania in Munich)
