= Los Nikis =

Spanish pop-punk group

- Also known as: Algete's Ramones
- Origin: Algete
- Genres: Pop-punk, punk rock
- Years active: 1981–present
- Website: www.losnikis.com

Los Nikis is a Spanish pop-punk group emerged from the 1980s associated to la Movida. They've been nicknamed "The Ramones from Algete" with songs that feature very simple music and humorous lyrics and subject matter. Some of their more famous songs are: El Imperio contraataca (The Empire strikes back), Mi chica se ha ido a Katmandú (My girl has gone to Kathmandu), Navidades en Siberia (Christmas in Siberia), Olaf el Vikingo (Olaf the Viking) and Medicina nuclear (Nuclear medicine).

Their cover of "Born to be alive" consisted of just repeating Me voy a Benidorm (I'm going to Benidorm). They also covered "Rhythm of the Rain", originally by The Cascades, as No vuelvo a ir a Benidorm (I'm not going to Benidorm again) with lyrics criticizing mass tourism in the Spanish coastal city. Due to this, the local administration declared them personae non gratae.
