= Glutamato Ye-Yé =

Spanish pop rock band

- Origin: Madrid, Spain
- Genres: Pop rock
- Years active: 1979–1986; 1987; 2008–present
- Labels: DRO; Goldstein; Ariola Records
- Past members: Ramón Recio (†); Iñaki Fernández (†); Manuel "Patacho" Recio; Alberto Haro (†); Eugenio Haro (†); Jacinto Golderos; Carlos Durante; Rafa Balmaseda

Glutamato Ye-Yé is a Spanish pop rock band formed in Madrid in 1979 and initially active until 1986. The group, along with Derribos Arias, Pelvis Turmix, and Sindicato Malone, was part of the so-called "hornadas irritantes" ("irritating waves"), opposing mainstream pop trends within the Movida Madrileña movement. They gained moderate commercial success in the mid-1980s with songs like "Todos los negritos tienen hambre (y frío)".

The band's flamboyant frontman, Iñaki Fernández, became an iconic figure of early 1980s Spanish pop culture, partly due to his provocative image, which included a fringe and a mustache reminiscent of Adolf Hitler and Charles Chaplin.

== History ==
Glutamato Ye-Yé was founded in 1979 by Ramón Recio and Iñaki Fernández, later joined by Manuel "Patacho" Recio and Alberto Haro. The band underwent numerous lineup changes, though its stable members included Ramón Recio (lyrics), Iñaki Fernández (vocals), Patacho (guitar), Eugenio Haro (guitar), Jacinto Golderos (bass), and Carlos Durante (drums).

After performing in various bars in Madrid, they signed with Spansuls in 1981 and recorded their first EP in 1982. Initially intended to be Spansuls release PNK-001, the record was sold to DRO, becoming their fifth release (DRO-005). It featured the track "Un hombre en mi nevera".

Due to Iñaki's compulsory military service, their first full-length album was replaced by the mini-LP Zoraida. In 1982, Ramón Recio founded the Goldstein label, which provided the band with more stability and allowed them to release songs like "Comamos cereales".

After the Goldstein distributor Pancoca went bankrupt, the band signed with Ariola Records. In 1984, they released the album Todos los negritos tienen hambre y frío, which included their eponymous satirical hit. The album sold approximately 40,000 copies. Their next release, Guapamente (1985), saw less commercial success but featured the song "Alicia", which earned them a Eurovision pre-selection nomination.

In 1986, they released Vivesubida, which adopted a more rock-oriented sound with tracks like "Hey, tío". Around that time, Eugenio Haro left to form the band Ciudad Jardín with Rodrigo de Lorenzo.

The group officially disbanded in 1986, reuniting for a farewell concert in 1987. In the following years, members pursued other projects. Iñaki Fernández formed Iñaki y Los Beatos, which later became Los Pecadores. Carlos Durante joined Desperados, and Patacho founded La Banda del Otro Lado with Fino Oyonarte and José María Granados (of Mamá).

Occasional reunions followed, often in tribute to deceased bandmates such as Ramón Recio (1962–1988), Alberto Haro (1964–1987), and Eugenio Haro Ibars (1958–1991).

On 23 May 2008, Glutamato Ye-Yé reunited for a concert at the Joy Eslava venue in Madrid.

Since then, the group has remained active, led by Patacho and Iñaki, performing regularly across Spain.

On 10 May 2025, lead singer Iñaki Fernández died of cancer at the age of 63.

== Discography ==
=== Albums ===
- Zoraida (Mini-LP, DRO, 1982)
- Todos los negritos tienen hambre y frío (Mini-LP, Ariola, 1984)
- Guapamente (Mini-LP, Ariola, 1985)
- Vivesubida (Album, Ariola, 1986)
- ¡VAYA CRISTO! (33rd Anniversary) (3-CD box set, Lemuria Music, 2011)

=== EPs ===
- Corazón loco (DRO, 1982)
- Conjuro a medias (La Fábrica Magnética, 1991)

=== Singles ===
- Comamos cereales (Goldstein, 1983)

=== Compilations and other releases ===
- Track on Navidades Radiactivas compilation: "Glutamatonavidad" (1982)
- Disco pocho (with Derribos Arias, GASA, 1983)
- ...¡Esto fue todo! (Double album, Twins, 1987)
- Y al tercer año (La Fábrica Magnética, 1989)
- Track on Homenaje a Poch: "No tienes ni idea" (1991)
- Track on Flamingo All Stars: "No sabes amar" (1998)
- Grandes éxitos, inéditos y rarezas (CD, Ventura, 2001)
