= Radio Futura =

Spanish pop rock group

- Origin: Madrid (Spain)
- Genres: Latin rock Punk rock Pop rock New wave Reggae
- Years active: 1979–1992
- Label: Ariola-RCA
- Past members: Santiago Auserón; Luis Auserón; Enrique Sierra; Herminio Molero; Javier Pérez Grueso; Carlos "Solrac" Velázquez; Carlos Torero; Pedro Navarrete; Javier Monforte; Óscar Quesada; Ollie Halsall; Antonio Vázquez

Radio Futura was a Spanish pop rock group. They rose to become one of the most popular bands in Spain during the 1980s and early 1990s. In 1989 they were voted the best Spanish act of the 1980s by the Spanish public.

== The beginnings ==
In 1979, painter, amateur singer and synthesizer experimenter Herminio Molero approached some of his acquaintances in order to form a pop-rock band. The final selection included the Auserón brothers, Luis and Santiago (who wrote reviews at the time in a music magazine under the name 'Corazones Automáticos'), Enrique Sierra (guitar player from Kaka de Luxe) and percussionist Javier Pérez Grueso. They got their name Radio Futura ("Future Radio") from an Italian independent radio station.

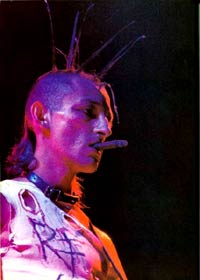
Enrique Sierra in his distinctively punk look (early 1980s)

Herminio Molero contributed with his fusion of electronic and traditional music to the style of the group while Enrique Sierra added a punk touch. The band soon became one of the iconic images of what came to be known as la Movida madrileña. After months of rehearsing and some live performances they published their first album Música Moderna in 1980, which yielded them an unexpected success with their single Enamorado de la moda juvenil (later on, the band's remaining core trio would say that they did not recognize themselves in this first record)

Molero and Pérez soon abandoned the group due to disagreements on the concept of their music, which left the band as a trio formed by Santiago Auserón (frontman, lyrics, guitar, vocals), Luis Auserón (bass guitar) and Enrique Sierra (guitar).

These three completed the line up in 1981 by recruiting drummer Carlos Velázquez, known as Solrac, who had already participated in the first album. After what had been a rather impromptu and basically amateur record, the new line up decided to take on a professional approach in their music career and get rid of their initial aura of "media pampered one hit wonder boys".

== The Quartet: a growing band ==
In 1981 they recorded the single "La estatua del jardín botánico", whose music video was one of the first ever produced in Spain, soon followed by "Dance usted", the former gave them a cult hit, with the latter they introduced what they described as a "funky-punky" sound virtually unknown in Spain by that time.

=== "La Ley del Desierto, la Ley del Mar" ===
The band had a struggle to escape from their contract with their original record company, Hispavox (nowadays a part of EMI, itself, due to EMI's regional offices being part of the Parlophone group, now part of Warner Music Group) since it desired to keep for their second album the same whimsical or mainstream touch of their first record, while the band's new line up had decided to break free from the fad and amateuresque touch of their first record, and devote themselves to developing a long term career.

They finally reached an agreement with their former record company and got signed for Ariola (part of BMG, itself now a part of Sony Music). During these months they had built a repertoire of several songs, which they played live, waiting for the record deal to release their second album. This was finally possible in 1984, when La ley del desierto, la ley del mar came out. A few years had passed from their first release and this interim helped the band to leave behind the echoes of their impromptu and whimsical, yet successful, debut album. At the same time, the hiatus allowed the band to work intensively on their new songs, which they self produced.

This their second album, whose sound was completely different from their debut, became another unexpected commercial success, with the hit single "Escuela de calor". Tracks included in this record such as "Semilla Negra" introduced the first hints of what would soon become their signature contribution: Latin rock based on a highly intellectualized basis (front man Santiago Auserón holds a degree in Philosophy and is known for lengthy answers in flourishing vocabulary) but, notwithstanding, aimed at the streets and addressed to the general populace; this popular turn became the standard in Spain after them, but was a virtually unknown territory back in the day when Radio Futura started defining its boundaries.

De un País en llamas (1985), the composed face in the cover is made up from captions from each band member

=== De un País en Llamas ===
Since the tour of La Ley del Desierto, La Ley del Mar had actually taken place before its actual release, it only took them one year to finish, in 1985, their next record De un país en llamas, a risky, stark and somewhat baroque new studio album recorded in London (an unusual choice for a Spanish band back in the day, due to a series of reasons -budget too). The album reads close to a concept album (starting with La ley del Desierto, la Ley del Mar, the band seemed to enjoy producing cohesive albums with some sort of internal leit motiv).

De un País en Llamas represented a big leap from its predecessor: it revolved around a punk attitude but, at the same time, it saw the band finally leaving behind their amateur times. Their record company provided a decent budget for the recording sessions, which allowed a state-of-the-art production and, with it, technical innovations and music effects new to the Spanish musical scene back then handled by producers Duncan Bridgeman and he who was to become their longtime musical companion and, in Santiago Auserón's words, some sort of a fourth band member in the dark: Jo Dworniak, both members of the band I-Level.

They also remixed their previous "Semilla Negra", increasing its Latin cadence and creating another cult pop song. The band was willing to explore a more Latin style in the fashion of songs like their own "El Tonto Simón" and drummer Solrac, who opposed this direction, abandoned the group in 1986.

== Quintet: La Canción de Juan Perro ==
By 1986, the band was looking for new textures for their music, more clear arrangements and a rhythm section leaning towards Latin sounds while keeping a rock attitude. Once the drummer position was filled with Carlos Torero, an additional fifth member was also recruited: Pedro Navarrete, at the keyboards, innovating this position in the band.

This new three core members plus two session musicians line-up gathered at Sigma Sound recording studio (owned then by Talking Heads) in New York City at the end of 1986 (that was, possibly, the first time that a Spanish band recorded in New York). Again, Jo Dworniak was in charge of production. The band delivered La Canción de Juan Perro, released in May 1987.

The record is characterized by a much more organic approach than its predecessor, from which it marked a new departure; their musical evolution brought to the band international hit singles such as "37 grados and "A Cara o Cruz". It aimed to get closer to the traditional sources of Spanish popular music, the hiring of a horns section (The Uptown Horns) for the recording sessions being probably the most clear statement of the new musical direction taken. The New York sessions are recalled by the band as their finest. The record had a good response and became their biggest seller to date. In retrospect, La Canción de Juan Perro is now considered, by the band and critics alike, as Radio Futura's finest effort. It is also credited for establishing in Spain the virtually unknown formulations of a Latin Rock based on standard Anglo Saxon pop-rock but, at the same time, deeply rooted in Spanish popular music, while striving for renovation at the same time. Santiago Auserón said regarding this record "we want the best with this record. We want to lay the foundations of Hispanic Rock"; the critic wrote regarding La Canción de Juan Perro: "it is not only a masterpiece of our domestic rock but it contains the entire musical landscape sung in Spanish during the last decades". The particular sound crafted in "La Canción de Juan Perro" was to become, later on, the touchstone of the Spanish musical scene. Also, beginning with this record, Santiago Auserón gave renewed importance to the lyrics, he has since become one of the finest lyricists in Spanish, earnestly using and renovating popular terms which had gone partially out of fashion.

Soon after the supporting tour for "La Canción de Juan Perro" started, Enrique Sierra was diagnosed with polycystic kidney disease and had to be temporary replaced by another newly hired session musician: Javier Monforte.

== Sextet and live album ==
By 1988, Enrique Sierra had overcome his health problems but the band decided to keep Javier Monforte as an additional guitar player, thus turning the band into a sextet (in the meantime, drummer Carlos Torero had been replaced by Óscar Quesada).

There was not any new LP scheduled for 1988 but the band toured instead and, in the meantime, released a new maxi-single, "Paseo con la Negra Flor", which is basically a new studio take of their song "La Negra Flor" (included in La Canción de Juan Perro), including features of what had been its growth as a song when performed live. The new single included a spoken word section which represented, once again, a big novelty in the Spanish musical scene.

La Canción de Juan Perro marked a success in the band's career, yet, following the suggestion of the label to compensate the relatively high budget (for a Spanish 1980s band) spent in NYC, the last two concerts of the tour were recorded, mixed and released by beginning 1989 as Radio Futura's only live album: Escuela de Calor which became a big seller.

Once the live album was released, the sextet disbanded and the remaining core trio planned what was going to be their last studio LP.

== Veneno en la Piel, mass success and last releases ==
In 1989, the band hit the road again for a tour. Again Enrique Sierra fell ill and was temporarily replaced by Ollie Halsall. The band was finally back in a studio by the end of the year with a new line up (Antonio Vázquez takes in the drums and Halsall was kept along with Enrique Sierra, whom the Auserón brothers waited on until he was recovered for the sessions). Also in 1989, the band is elected by popular vote as the best Spanish band of the 1980s.

By January 1990 they had completed what came to be their last studio LP, entitled Veneno en la piel. The self-produced album remained faithful to the Latin Rock its predecessor had defined, with no major style changes other than an even more basic or "clean" sound.

The album went straight to #1 in the charts and stayed there for weeks; prodded by their record company, the band took on their biggest live tour to date. On Sept. 30th, 1990, the band closed it in Madrid with what was going to be their last live performance as a band.

By the time the tour was finished, the band members had grown weary of the musical business and the enormous amounts of money generated around the band, with no precedent in the Spanish indie pop-rock scene. Having achieved notoriety and an almost uncontested lead in the Spanish pop-rock scene (only challenged by the synth-pop oriented trio Mecano), and also influenced by Enrique Sierra's health problems and Halsall's death due to an overdose in 1992, they decided it was time to disband at the height of their careers before the music industry devoured their creativity as artists.

== Remixing, compilations and tribute records ==
Still the band was forced by contractual ties to make a further record. To fulfil this obligation, in 1992 they went into the studio again with Dworniak to produce Tierra para bailar a record which includes new takes of old songs and a brand new one (El puente azul) which became their last original recording. With this one, their record deal with Ariola was finished and so too the band, as they had decided not to tour to support this record.

After they disbanded, there have been a number of rarities, compilations and tribute records, such as Rarezas (a rarities record part of a box released in 1992 including their whole discography). Then Memoria del porvenir was released six years after, in 1998, as a new compilation with different takes and re-recordings by the own band of some of their classics. In 2003, there was a final compilation in box format Caja de canciones which intends to be an ultimate luxury compilation aimed at the fan base including all of the band productions.

A Greatest Hits special edition was released in 2004 under the name Lo mejor de Radio Futura: Paisajes eléctricos (1982-1992). Also in 2004 appeared the tribute record Arde la calle. Un tributo a Radio Futura including covers of the band's hits by a selection of contemporary bands and artists from the Spanish speaking world. In 2008, "Escuela De Calor" was featured in Guitar Hero: World Tour.

== Former members ==
- Santiago Auserón - guitar, vocals, lyrics (1979-1992)
- Luis Auserón - bass guitar, backing vocals (1979-1992)
- Enrique Sierra - guitar (1979-1987, 1988-1989, 1989-1992; died 2012)
- Herminio Molero - vocals (1979-1980)
- Javier Pérez Grueso - drums (1979-1980)
- Carlos "Solrac" Velázquez - drums (1981-1986)
- Carlos Torero - drums (1986-1988)
- Pedro Navarrete - keyboards (1986-1992)
- Javier Monforte - guitars (1987-1992)
- Óscar Quesada - drums (1988-1989)
- Ollie Halsall - guitar (1989-1992; died 1992)
- Antonio Vázquez - drums (1989-1992)

== Discography ==
=== Albums ===
- Música moderna (Emi-Hispavox, 1980)
- La ley del desierto, la ley del mar (RCA, 1984)
- De un país en llamas (RCA, 1985)
- La Canción de Juan Perro (RCA, 1987)
- Escuela de calor. El directo de Radio Futura (RCA, 1989; live album)
- Veneno en la piel (RCA, 1990)
- Tierra para bailar (RCA, 1991; the band remixing some of their own songs)
- Memoria del porvenir (the band re-recording some of their own hits 1998)

=== Compilation albums ===
- Caja de canciones (includes all their records with RCA and a Rarities album) (RCA, 2003)
- Lo Mejor de Radio Futura: Paisajes Eléctricos (1982-1992) (2004)

=== Tribute albums ===
- Arde la Calle. Un Tributo a Radio Futura (2004)
