= Fangoria (band) =

Spanish band

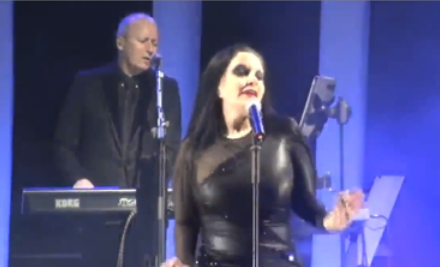
- Nacho Canut (left) and Alaska (right) during a concert in 2013

Background information
- Origin: Madrid, Spain
- Genres: Electropop; dance-pop; synth-pop; house; art pop
- Years active: 1989–present
- Labels: Hispavox; GASA; Sonic Metal Disco; Running Circle; Subterfuge; Atlantic; DRO; Warner Music Spain
- Members: Alaska; Nacho Canut
- Website: fangoriaoficial.com

Fangoria are a Spanish electropop duo formed in Madrid in 1989. Consisting of primary vocalist Alaska and keyboardist Nacho Canut.

== History ==
In 1977, Alaska, along with Nacho Canut and Carlos Berlanga, formed the band Alaska y los Pegamoides. Later, in 1982, they changed the name to Alaska y Dinarama. The group was popular and influential during La Movida Madrileña. Some of their famous recordings include "¿A quién le importa?" and "Ni tú ni nadie". The latter was entered for the Spanish heats of the Eurovision Song Contest in 1985 and later covered by the Mexican group Mœnia in 2004 and by the Puerto Rican band Circo in 2005. Their "¿A quién le importa?" also was later covered by Mexican pop musician Thalía in 2002.

In 1989, Carlos Berlanga left, and the band transformed once again, this time adopting the name of the American horror film magazine Fangoria. They had already made clear their fascination with American z-movies, with songs like "Mi novio es un Zombi" (My Boyfriend Is a Zombie) and "La rebelión de los electrodomésticos" (The Rebellion of the Household Appliances). With each name change, the band moved further away from punk and further embraced electropop, although strong guitars have generally always been present in their performances.

Since the birth of Fangoria in 1990, Alaska and Nacho Canut have recorded and launched several albums, always in the dance-pop electronica pattern.

Some of their best-known songs include

- "En la Disneylandia del amor" (1993)
- "No sé qué me das" (2001)
- "Eternamente inocente"(2001)
- "Retorciendo palabras" (2004)
- "Miro la vida pasar" (2004)
- "Criticar por Criticar" (2006)
- "Absolutamente" (2009)
- "Dramas y comedias" (2013)
- "Fiesta en el infierno" (2016)

Moreover, "Hombres" and "Me Odio Cuando Miento" were featured in the 2004 movie Cachorro. Their lyrics typically revolve around sadness, loneliness, jealousy and desire: these tragic contents usually contrast with the music, which normally is up-tempo and disco-oriented, although they have recorded downtempo songs as well. Some of their singles have been remixed by Marc Almond (formerly of Soft Cell) and Vive la Fête.

In 2009, they released their tenth studio album Absolutamente; the first single "Más es Más" was released before the release of the album. Later they released the second single, "La Pequeña Edad de Hielo". More recently, in 2010, a set of three CDs came out titled El Paso Trascendental del Vodevil a la Astracanada. This release consists of Fangoria's greatest hits and rare recordings, as well as 15 completely re-made versions of their older hits from their previous bands, such as "Bailando", "A quién le importa?", "Ni tú ni nadie" or "Perlas ensangrentadas".

== Discography ==
Studio albums

- Salto mortal (1991)
- Una temporada en el infierno (1999)
- Naturaleza muerta (2001)
- Arquitectura efímera (2004)
- El extraño viaje (2006)
- Absolutamente (2009)
- Cuatricromía (2013)
- Canciones para robots románticos (2016)
- Extrapolaciones y dos preguntas (1989-2000) (2019)
- Extrapolaciones y dos respuestas (2001-2019) (2019)
