= Gabinete Caligari =

Spanish rock band, 1981-1999

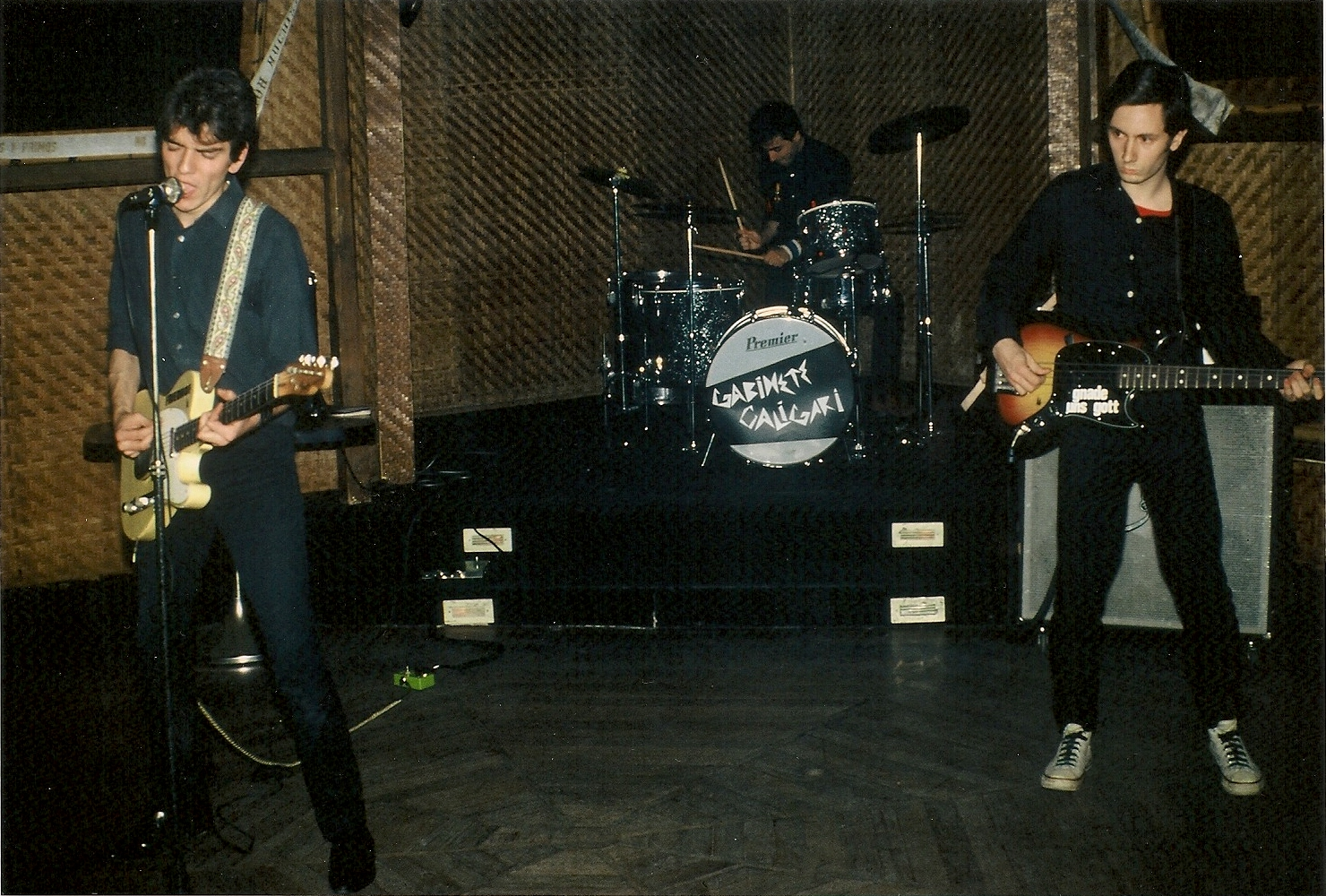
- Gabinete Caligari in 1981

Background information
- Origin: Madrid, Spain
- Genres: Pop, rock
- Years active: 1981-1999
- Labels: Tres Cipreses; EMI; Mercury Records
- Past members: Jaime Urrutia; Fernando Ferni Presas; Eduardo Edi Clavo

Gabinete Caligari is a Spanish rock band part of La Movida Madrileña movement. It lasted from 1981 to 1999.

Its name references the film The Cabinet of Dr. Caligari.

Its most famous songs are Cuatro rosas, Camino Soria, La culpa fue del cha-cha-cha and Al calor del amor en un bar.

== Discography ==
=== Records ===
- Parálisis Permanente/Gabinete Caligari (Tic Tac, 1981/Remade by Tres Cipreses, 1983) (alongside Parálisis Permanente).
- Obediencia (Tres Cipreses, 1982). EP.
- Que Dios reparta suerte (DRO/Tres Cipreses, 1983).
- Cuatro Rosas (DRO/Tres Cipreses, 1985). Mini álbum.
- Al calor del amor en un bar (DRO/Tres Cipreses, 1986).
- Camino Soria (EMI, 1987).
- Privado (EMI, 1989).
- Cien mil vueltas (EMI, 1991).
- Gabinetíssimo (Mercury Records, 1995).
- ¡Subid la Música! (Get, 1998).

=== Compilations ===
- Los singles (DRO/Tres Cipreses, 1987).
- Héroes de los 80 (DRO, 1991).
- Sombras negras (DRO/Tres Cipreses, 1993).
- Grandes éxitos (EMI, 1993).
- La culpa fue de Gabinete (EMI, 2004).
- Grandes éxitos: Gabinete Caligari|Grandes éxitos (EMI, 2005).
- Lo Mejor de Gabinete Caligari (EMI, 2009).

=== Singles ===
- Golpes (1981).
- Olor a carne quemada (1982).
- Obediencia (1982).
- Sangre Española (1983).
- Que Dios Reparta Suerte (1983).
- Cuatro Rosas (1984).
- Haciendo el Bobo (1985).
- Gasolina con ricino (BSO Madrid Tránsito) (1985).
- ¡Caray! (1985).
- Al calor del amor en un bar (1986).
- Malditos refranes (1986).
- El juego y el juguete (1986).
- La sangre de tu tristeza (1987).
- Camino Soria (1988).
- Suite nupcial (1988).
- Tócala, Uli (1988).
- Sólo se vive una vez (1989).
- Amor de madre (1990).
- Amor Prohibido (1990).
- La culpa fue del cha cha cha (1990).
- La culpa fue del cha-cha-cha (mix) (1990).
- Lo Mejor de Ti (1991).
- Queridos Camaradas (1992).
- Como un Animal (1992).
- Viaje al Averno (1992).
- Delirios de Grandeza (1993).
- Truena (1995).
- Un petardo en el C (1995).
- En paro (1998).
- Nadie me va a añorar (1998).
- Underground (1998).

=== Video/DVD ===
- A Tope (1983).
- La culpa fue de Gabinete (EMI, 2004).
- La filmoteca del Dr. Caligari (EMI, 2004).

=== Concerts ===
- Gabinete Caligari en directo (2016).
