= La Movida Madrileña =

20th-century Spanish countercultural movement

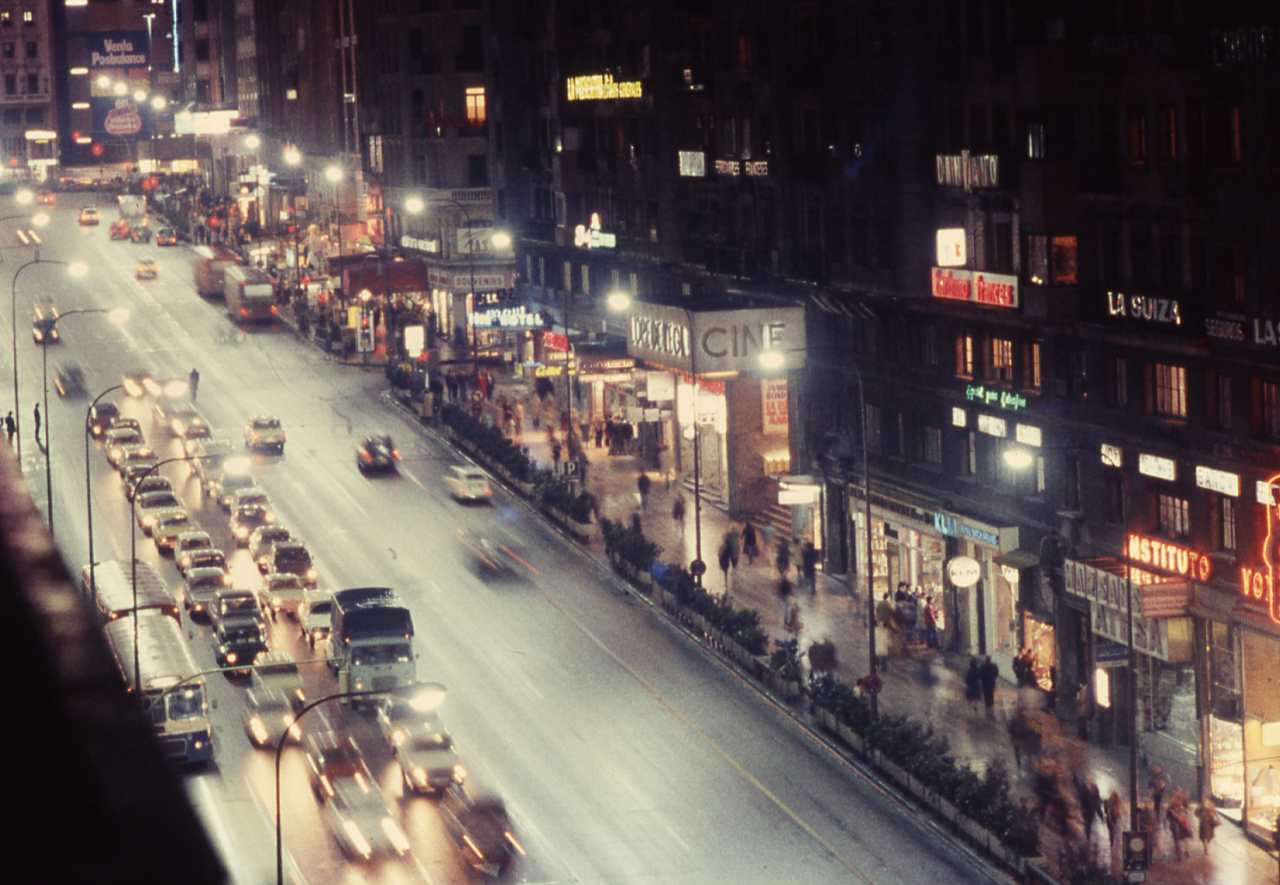
Madrid at night in 1980, photo by Paolo Monti. Members of the Movida coined several notable slogans of the city: Madrid nunca duerme ("Madrid never sleeps"), Esta noche todo el mundo a la calle ("Tonight everybody to the street") or Madrid me mata ("Madrid kills me").

La Movida Madrileña (Spanish: [moˈβiða maðɾiˈleɲa], 'the Madrilenian scene'), also known simply as La Movida, was a countercultural movement that emerged mainly in Madrid during the Spanish transition to democracy following the death of the dictator Francisco Franco in 1975. The movement coincided with Spain's economic growth and a widespread desire to forge a post-Franco identity. The tribute concert to "Canito" [es] held on 9 February 1980, is traditionally regarded as the beginning of La Movida Madrileña.

The movement was characterised by the rise of punk rock and synth-pop, a more open attitude towards sexual expression and drug use, and the emergence of new dialects such as cheli. This hedonistic cultural wave began in Madrid before spreading to other cities, including Barcelona, Bilbao and Vigo.

== Origins ==
In the years following the death of Francisco Franco, a growing underground punk rock music scene began to form in Madrid. Inspired by the growth of punk rock in the United Kingdom, a number of punk and synthpop bands, such as Tos and Aviador Dro, formed in the late 1970s. However, this new counterculture clashed heavily with the Spanish national government, during a time when evening curfew for women, criminalisation of homosexuality, and arrests of people with unorthodox appearances for violating a law regarding "dangerousness and social rehabilitation" were frequent.

La Movida Madrileña gained notoriety following a large concert at the Higher Technical School of Civil Engineers (ETSICCP) at the Technical University of Madrid on February 9, 1980. Although Francoist elements continued to oppose the increasing liberalization of the city, the government under socialist mayor Enrique Tierno Galván had a more open approach regarding the movement, and subsidized various artistic endeavours. A number of influential foreign artists, such as The Ramones and Andy Warhol, visited Madrid during this time.

== Characteristics ==
La Movida Madrileña's central component was an aesthetic influenced by punk rock and synth-pop music, as well as visual schools such as dada and futurism. The aesthetic permeated into the city's street fashion, photography, cartoons, and murals, manifesting itself in bright colours, voluminous hair, unconventional and revealing clothing, and heavy makeup use among both genders.

In addition to these artistic representations, La Movida Madrileña also effected an emergent LGBTQ+ community, illicit drug use, and the use of the cheli dialect.

Although some people involved with the movement testified to a lack of a unified political ideology, many elements of the movement were antifascist and had anarchist leanings. Writ large, the Movida represented an anti-systemic and nihilistic perspective, and was not a political movement.

== Examples ==
The Movida encompassed several different genres of art; Pedro Almodóvar became a well-known example internationally after his success as a film director.

=== Music ===
In moods, looks and attitude, musicians drew influence from punk rock, post-punk, synth-pop and new wave music, as well as Germany's Neue Deutsche Welle, while sometimes (in the case of Mecano) mimicking the visual styles of the British New Romantic movement.

Two popular bands of the Movida were Mecano and Alaska y los Pegamoides. Songs like "¿A quien le importa?" (What's it to you) and "Ni tú ni nadie" (Not you, not anyone) represented themes of self-expression and confidence.

Notable artists included Kaka de luxe, Derribos Arias, Parálisis Permanente, Ejecutivos agresivos, Radio Futura, Alaska y Dinarama, Los Nikis, Gabinete Caligari, Nacha Pop, Glutamato Ye-Yé and Los Secretos. As an echo of the Madrid scene, parallel movements emerged in many other cities of Spain like Barcelona (Loquillo y los trogloditas, Los Rebeldes, El último de la fila), León (Los Cardiacos, Los Flechazos...), Vigo (Siniestro Total, Golpes Bajos, Os Resentidos, Aerolíneas Federales, Semen Up...), and Granada (091).

=== Film and television ===
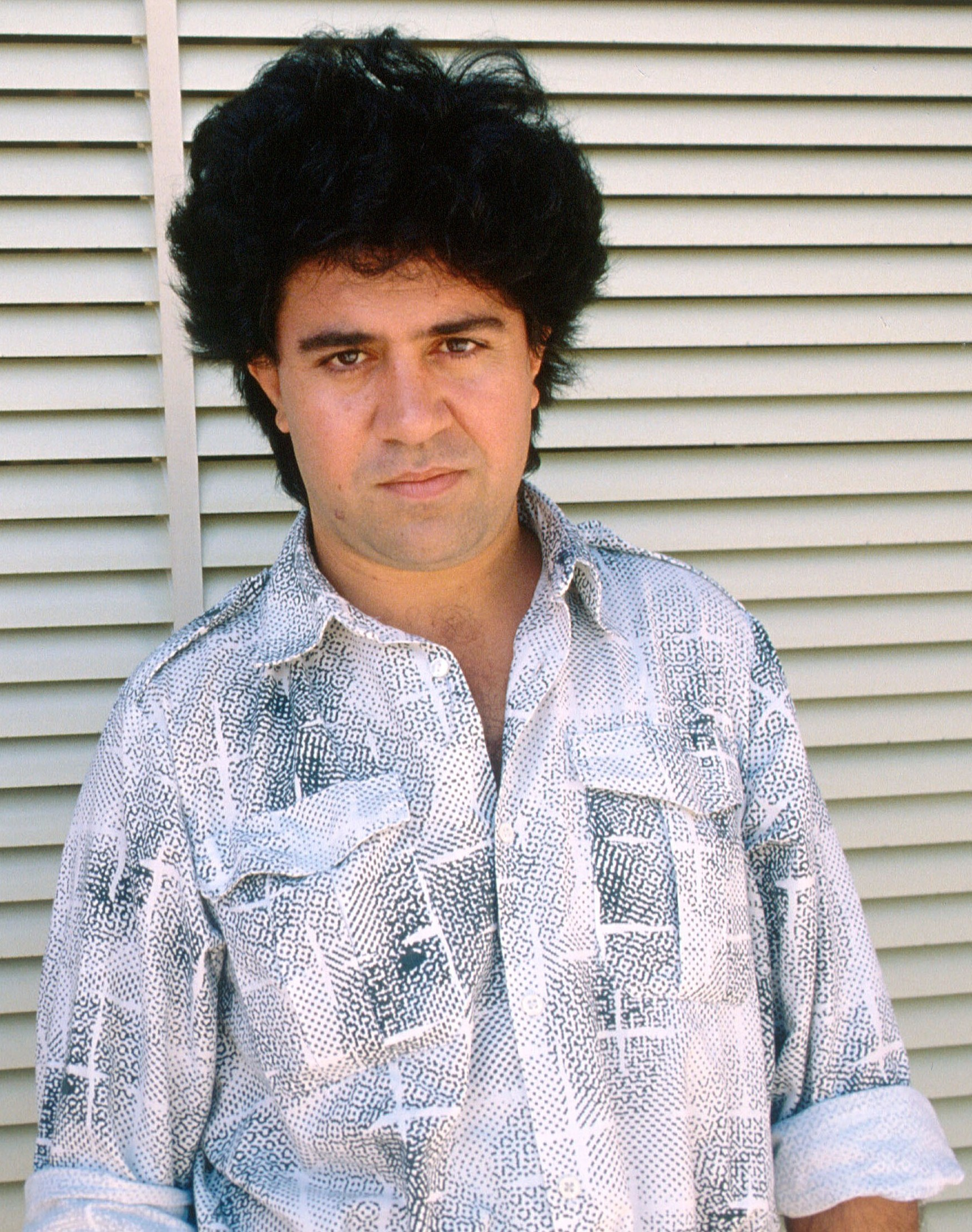
Film director Pedro Almodóvar (pictured in 1988) emerged during the Movida Madrileña.

Almodóvar comically reflected the messiness of the freedom of those years, particularly in his films Pepi, Luci, Bom y otras chicas del montón; Laberinto de pasiones; and ¿Qué he hecho yo para merecer esto! (1984). TV programs like La Bola de Cristal and La Edad de Oro contributed to spread the aesthetics of the movement to a wider audience.

Pedro Almodóvar had a significant influence on the Movida with his films, and remains its most internationally famous participant. His films included themes such as homosexuality and criticised the Catholic Church and Francoism, while his characters frequently challenged traditional family and gender roles.

=== Photography and painting ===
Notable photographers of the Movida include Alberto García-Alix, Ouka Leele, and Miguel Trillo. These photographers focused their work on bands, concerts, and their scenes. Illustrator Ceesepe is considered a major figure in the movement and with his friends El Hortelano and Ouka Leele moved from comics to painting as their primary expression—Ouka Leele's photographs were hand-painted color over black-and-white images.

=== Graffiti ===
Juan Carlos Argüello, a.k.a. Muelle, was the principal street artist of the Movida. Argüello's unique style, originating in Madrid's Campamento neighborhood, would later be described as “graffiti autóctono madrileño” (autochthonous Madrilenian graffiti) and inspired many subsequent Spanish street artists. Argüello also founded a punk rock band, Salida de Emergencia (“Emergency Exit”), in which he played the drums. He would die in 1995. While the graffiti arising from the Movida was originally treated with suspicion by Madrid authorities, it has since been preserved and promoted by the city. On October 19, 2016, Madrid dedicated a special garden to him in the neighborhood where he once lived.

=== Literature ===
Writers Gregorio Morales, Vicente Molina Foix, Luis Antonio de Villena, Javier Barquín, José Tono Martínez, Luis Mateo Díez, José Antonio Gabriel y Galán, José Luis Moreno-Ruiz and Ramón Mayrata were prominent in the Tertulia de Creadores, which were a cycle of meetings, lectures, debates and happenings that took place in the Círculo de Bellas Artes in Madrid between 1983 and 1984. Many of them, such as Gregorio Morales, José Tono Martínez or Ramón Mayrata, were regular collaborators of the art magazine La Luna de Madrid. Other publications, such as Oscar Mariné's magazine Madrid Me Mata (Madrid Kills Me) contributed to the creation of a common identity.

Another important figure outside the artistic world of the Movida was journalist Francisco Umbral, a writer for the newspaper El País, who wrote about and documented the movement.

=== Queerness ===
Queer people were prominent in the Movida, which aimed to create art and culture beyond Spain's traditional Catholic heteronormativity. The post-Franco era in Madrid was the first time in recent Spanish history where queer people were able to publicly embrace their identities, and the first time where homophobic attitudes were systemically challenged. During the flourishing of the Movida, Chueca became established as a central gay neighborhood of Madrid, a position it continues to hold. Chueca became renowned as a center of Spanish lesbian literature.

== Legacy ==
The Movida continues to exert cultural influence on Spain. In the late 2000s and early 2010s, aspects of the movement were revived in a movement dubbed "La Removida". The "Removida" aimed to enshrine the memory of the original Movida through documentation, events, and films, and bring the ambiguous principles of postmodern identity back to the fore.

== See also ==
- Movida viguesa
- Ruta del Bakalao
- Basque Radical Rock

== Sources ==
- Nichols, William J.; Song, H. Rosi, eds. (2013). Toward a Cultural Archive of la Movida: Back to the Future. Rowman & Littlefield. ISBN 978-1-61147-631-6.
