= Derribos Arias =

Spanish post-punk band

- Origin: Madrid, Spain
- Genres: Post-punk, punk, psychedelic rock
- Years active: 1981–1987
- Label: Grabaciones Accidentales (GASA)
- Past members: Poch (vocals, guitar); Alejo Alberdi (guitar, keyboards, programming); Juan Verdera (bass); Manuel "Paul" Moreno (drums); Deme Gómez (bass); Ñete (drums); Flete (guitar); Rafa Balmaseda (bass)

Derribos Arias was a Spanish post-punk band active during the 1980s and a notable figure within the cultural movement known as the Movida Madrileña. Formed in Madrid in 1981, the group was led by the eccentric and charismatic musician Poch (Ignacio Gasca). Their sound combined elements of post-punk, punk, and psychedelia with absurd, dadaist humor and an experimental, often chaotic sonic palette.

== History ==
The origins of Derribos Arias can be traced to the creative impulses of Poch, a former medical student from San Sebastián, known for his outlandish performances and surrealist flair. Before founding the band, he was involved in other musical projects such as Ejecutivos Agresivos, which recorded the minor hit "Mari Pili", and later, La Banda Sin Futuro, whose unreleased recordings gained cult status over time.

Derribos Arias was formed in 1981, initially consisting of Poch (vocals, guitar), Alejo Alberdi (guitar, keyboards, programming), Juan Verdera (bass), and Manuel "Paul" Moreno (drums). They quickly became one of the most irreverent and avant-garde acts of the early 1980s Spanish underground, often associated with the so-called hornadas irritantes movement.

Their debut EP, Branquias bajo el agua (1982), released on Grabaciones Accidentales (GASA), introduced their idiosyncratic style: surrealist lyrics, mechanical rhythms, and a minimalist aesthetic reminiscent of bands like Joy Division or Pere Ubu.

They followed up with several singles, including A-Flúor (1982) and Aprenda alemán en 7 días (1983), leading up to their only full-length studio album, En la guía, en el listín (1983). The album, while unconventional, received positive reviews in the alternative press and established their cult status.

Their final release, Disco Pocho (1984), marked a decline in critical reception, and shortly after, the band began to disband. Poch was diagnosed in the mid-1980s with Huntington's disease, a degenerative neurological disorder that progressively affected his mobility and cognition. He died in 1998.

In 1991, a tribute album entitled El chico más pálido de la playa de Gros was released, featuring covers of Poch’s work (both solo and with Derribos Arias) by groups such as Siniestro Total, Gabinete Caligari, Negu Gorriak, and Fangoria. The proceeds were intended to support Poch during the final stages of his illness.

== Musical style ==
Derribos Arias combined post-punk instrumentation with absurdist humor, satirical lyrics, and dadaist aesthetics. Their performances were theatrical, chaotic, and frequently surreal, involving costumes, props, and spontaneous disruptions. Critics often drew comparisons to The Residents or Devo, rather than their Spanish contemporaries. Poch’s vocals—often off-key, ironic, or distorted—became a hallmark of their unconventional sound.

== Members ==
- Poch (Ignacio Gasca) – vocals, guitar
- Alejo Alberdi – guitar, keyboards, programming
- Juan Verdera – bass
- Manuel "Paul" Moreno – drums

Other members:

- Deme Gómez – bass
- Ñete – drums
- Flete – guitar
- Rafa Balmaseda – bass

== Discography ==
=== Studio albums ===
- En la guía, en el listín (1983, GASA)

=== EPs and singles ===
- Branquias bajo el agua (EP, 1982)
- A-Flúor (Single & Maxi-Single, 1982)
- Aprenda alemán en 7 días (1983)
- Disco Pocho (Maxi-Single and Single, 1984)

=== Compilations ===
- CD (1996, GASA)
- La centralita de información (2001, DRO)

=== Tribute album ===
- El chico más pálido de la playa de Gros (1991)

== Legacy ==
Though short-lived, Derribos Arias has become a cult icon in Spanish underground music. Their satirical and avant-garde approach influenced a generation of musicians who embraced the absurd and the experimental within pop structures. Retrospectives and biographies continue to reassess their contribution to post-Franco counterculture.

== See also ==
- Movida Madrileña
- Post-punk
- Poch (musician)
