= Culture of Galicia =

Culture and traditions of Galicia, Spain

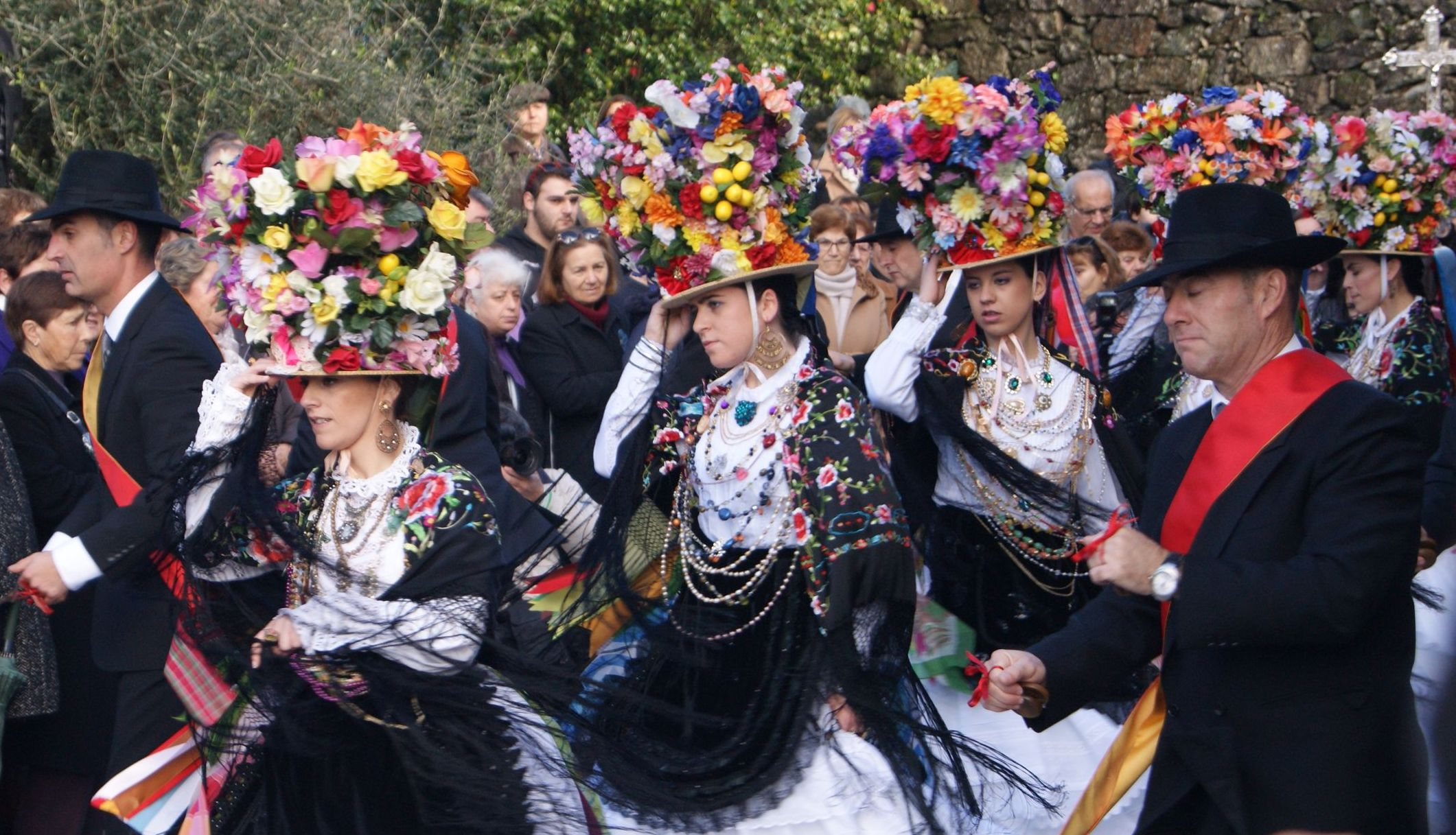
A Danza de San Sebastián

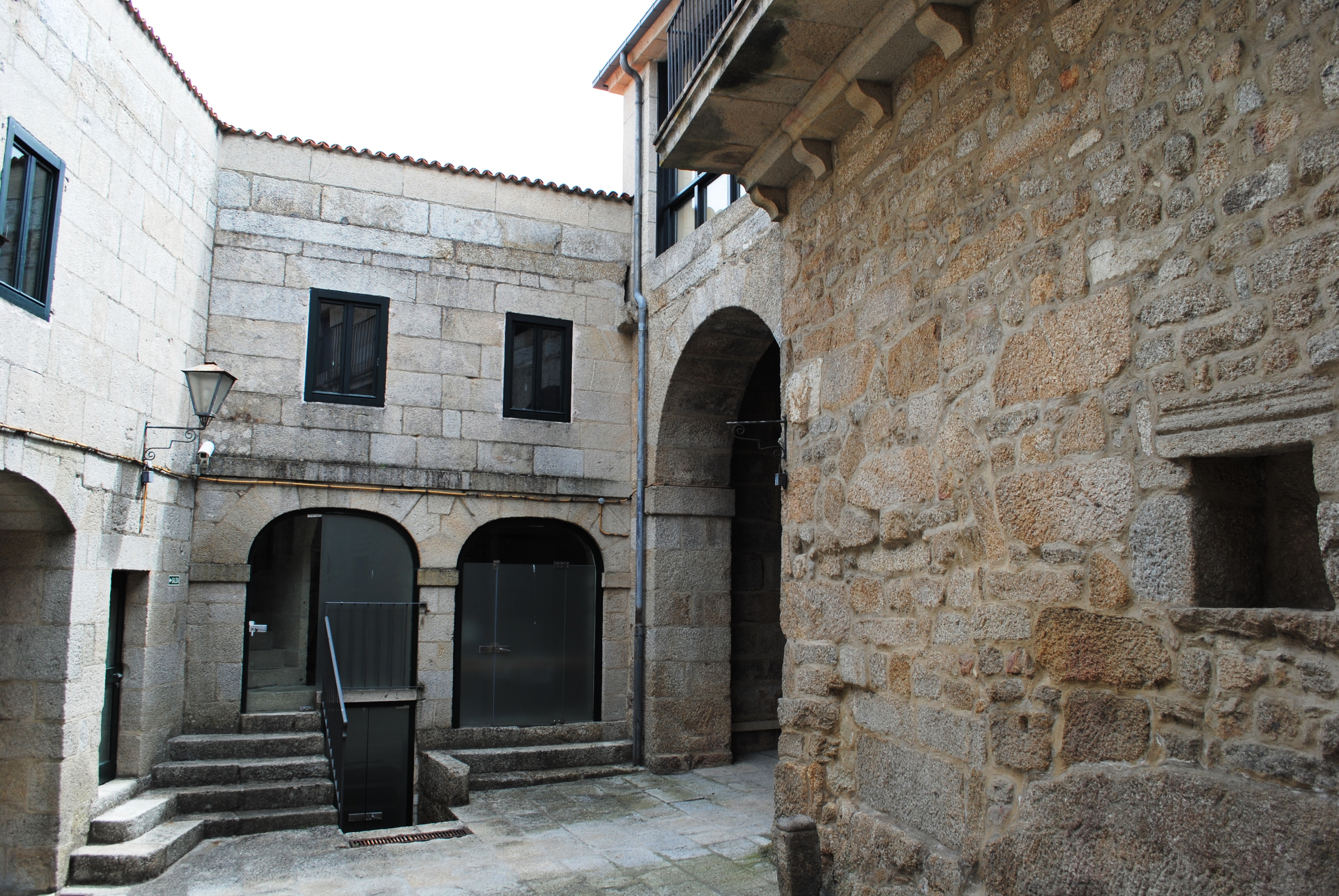
The Museo Etnolóxico de Ribadavia

The culture of Galicia encompasses the customs, practices, artistic expressions, and social norms associated with the Galician people of northwestern Spain. It is characterized by a distinct language (Galician), a rich tradition of music featuring the gaita (bagpipe), and a cultural heritage with historical connections to Celtic traditions. Mythology and folklore are significant parts of Galician culture, featuring figures such as Breogán, the legendary founder; the Mouros, associated with ancient sites; and the meigas, or witches. Important traditions include Entroido, the Galician equivalent of Carnival; and the numerous local "festas" or festivals, often centered around religious or agricultural cycles. Galicia also has a distinctive cuisine, architecture (including the characteristic "hórreos" or granaries), and a strong sense of regional identity.

== Literature ==
Medieval Galician poetry

What dear delight this summer day,
Its trees and flowers, to me doth bring,
And birds that songs of love here sing,
For joyfully without care
I go, ev'n as all lovers fare,
Who gay and merry are alway.

And when I pass by streams that wind
Beneath fair trees, through meadows fair,
It their love-song the birds say there,
Then all in love I sing straightaway,
And there of love compose my lay
And love-songs make in many a kind.
Great joy and mirth with me abide
When birds sing in sweet summertide.

— Joan Airas (13th century),
translation by Aubrey F. G. Bell

As with many other Romance languages, Galician-Portuguese emerged as a literary language in the Middle Ages, during the 12th-13th century, when a rich lyric tradition developed. However, in the face of the hegemony of Castilian Spanish, during the so-called Séculos Escuros ("Dark Centuries"), from 1530 to 1800, it fell from major literary or legal use, revived again during the 19th century Rexurdimento with such writers as Rosalía de Castro, Manuel Murguía, Manuel Leiras Pulpeiro, and Eduardo Pondal. In the 20th century, before the Spanish Civil War the Irmandades da Fala ("Brotherhood of the Language") and Grupo Nós included such writers as Vicente Risco, Ramón Cabanillas and Castelao; the Seminario de Estudos Galegos promoted the study of the language. Public use of Galician was largely suppressed in Francoist Spain but has been resurgent since the restoration of democracy. Contemporary Writers in Galician include Xosé Luís Méndez Ferrín, Manuel Rivas, and Suso de Toro. Recently, authors such as María Xosé Queizán, Luísa Villalta, Rexina Vega, Chus Pato, Olga Novo, Estíbaliz Espinosa, Ledicia Costas, Ismael Ramos and Berta Dávila have revolutionized Galician literature with new concepts, forms and perspectives.

== Cuisine ==
Wines of Galicia with Denominación de orixe

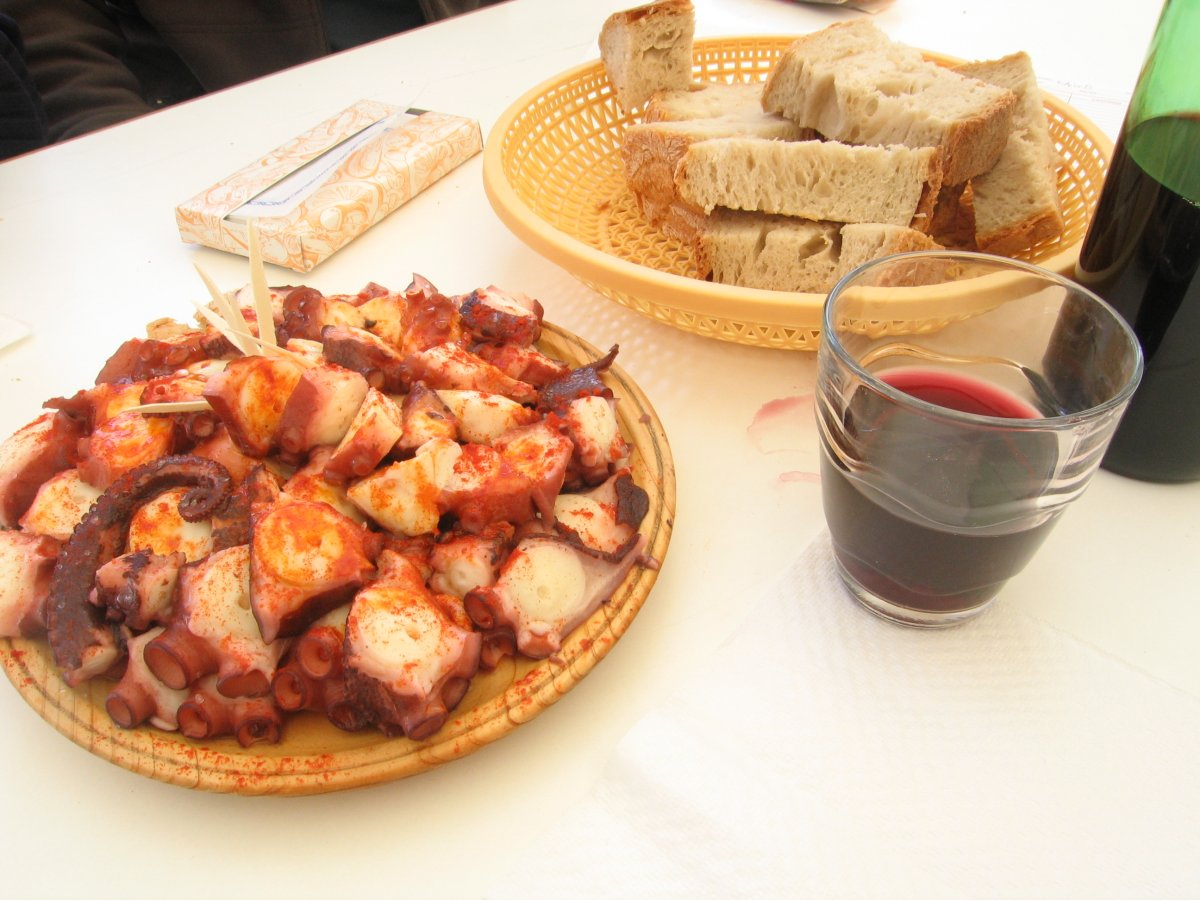
Polbo á feira

Galician cuisine often uses fish and shellfish. The empanada is a meat or fish pie, with a bread-like base, top and crust with the meat or fish filling usually being in a tomato sauce including onions and garlic. Caldo galego is a hearty soup whose main ingredients are potatoes and a local vegetable named grelo (Broccoli rabe). The latter is also employed in Lacón con grelos, a typical carnival dish, consisting of pork shoulder boiled with grelos, potatoes and chorizo. Centolla is the equivalent of King Crab. It is prepared by being boiled alive, having its main body opened like a shell, and then having its innards mixed vigorously. Another popular dish is octopus, boiled (traditionally in a copper pot) and served in a wooden plate, cut into small pieces and laced with olive oil, sea salt and pimentón (Spanish paprika). This dish is called Pulpo a la gallega or in Galician "Polbo á Feira", which roughly translates as "Galician-style Octopus". There are several regional varieties of cheese. The best-known one is the so-called tetilla, named after its breast-like shape. Other highly regarded varieties include the San Simón cheese from Vilalba and the creamy cheese produced in the Arzúa-Curtis area. The latter area produces also high-quality beef. A classical dessert is filloas, crêpe-like pancakes made with flour, broth or milk, and eggs. When cooked at a pig slaughter festival, they may also contain the animal's blood. A famous almond cake called Tarta de Santiago (St. James' cake) is a Galician sweet speciality mainly produced in Santiago de Compostela.

Galicia has 30 products with Denominación de orixe (D.O.), some of them with Denominación de Origen Protegida (D.O.P.). D.O. and D.O.P. are part of a system of regulation of quality and geographical origin among Spain's finest producers. Galicia produces a number of high-quality wines, including Albariño, Ribeiro, Ribeira Sacra, Monterrei and Valdeorras. The grape varieties used are local and rarely found outside Galicia and Northern Portugal. Just as notably from Galicia comes the spirit Aguardente—the name means burning water—often referred to as Orujo in Spain and internationally or as caña in Galicia. This spirit is made from the distillation of the pomace of grapes.

== Sport ==
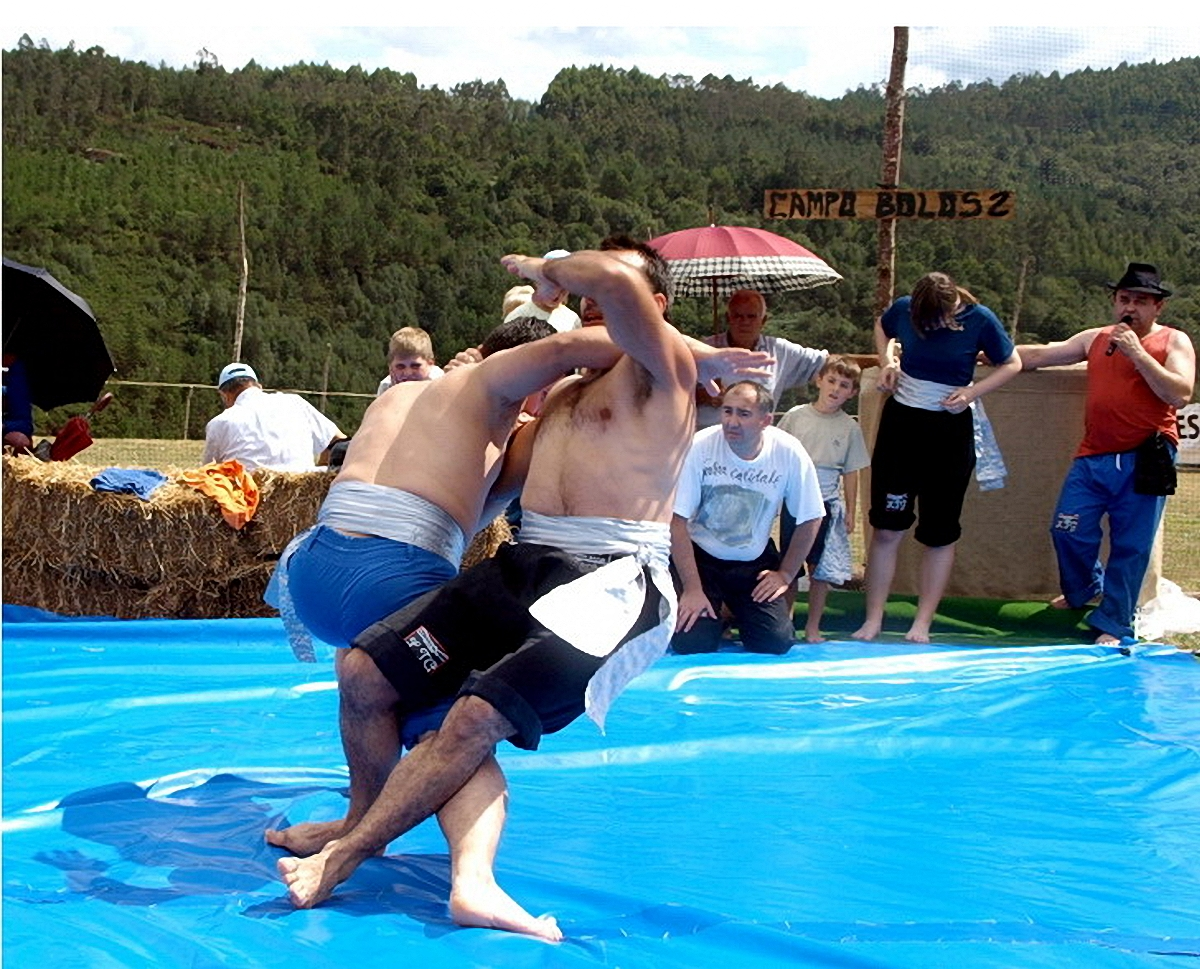
Galician wrestling

As in the rest of Spain, football is the most popular sport in Galicia. Deportivo de La Coruña, from the city of A Coruña, is the region's most successful club. Celta de Vigo, from Vigo, are also a major club and are Deportivo's principal regional rivals. When the two sides play, it is referred to as the Galician derby. SD Compostela from Santiago de Compostela and Racing Ferrol from Ferrol are two other notable club sides. Similarly to Catalonia and the Basque Country, Galicia also periodically fields a regional team against the international opposition (see Galicia autonomous football team).

Other popular sports in Galicia include futsal (a variety of indoor football), handball and basketball. Galicia is also noted for a great tradition of maritime sports, both sea and river-based - sports such as rowing, yachting, canoeing and surfing. Gaelic football is also a growing sport in the region, with multiple teams from Galicia playing in GAA Europe competitions.

== Contemporary music ==
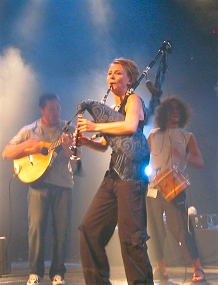
Piper Susana Seivane

=== Pop and rock ===
- Los Suaves: hard rock/heavy metal band active since the early 1980s, from Ourense
- Deluxe: pop/rock band from A Coruña led by Xoel López
- Los Limones: indie rock/indie pop/post-rock group from Ferrol led by Ferrol born Santi Santos, active since the early '80s
- Siniestro Total: punk rock band
- Os Resentidos: led by Antón Reixa in the 1980s
- Heredeiros da Crus: rock band singing in Galician language
- Triángulo de Amor Bizarro: indie rock/noise pop/post-punk band

=== Folk and traditionally based music ===
- Luar na Lubre: a band inspired by traditional Galician Celtic music. They have collaborated with Mike Oldfield and other musicians.
- Carlos Núñez: he has also collaborated with a great number of artists, being notable his long-term friendship with The Chieftains.
- Susana Seivane: virtuoso piper. She descends from a family of pipe makers and stated she preferred pipes instead of dolls during her childhood.
- Milladoiro
- Cristina Pato

== Public holidays ==
- Día de San Xosé (St. Joseph's Day) on 19 March (strictly religious)
- Día do Traballo (May Day) on 1 May
- Día das Letras Galegas (Galician Literature Day) on 17 May
- Día da Patria Galega (Galicia's National Day) also known as St. James the Apostle Day on 25 July
- Día da Nosa Señora (Day of Our Lady) on 15 August (strictly religious)

=== Festivals ===
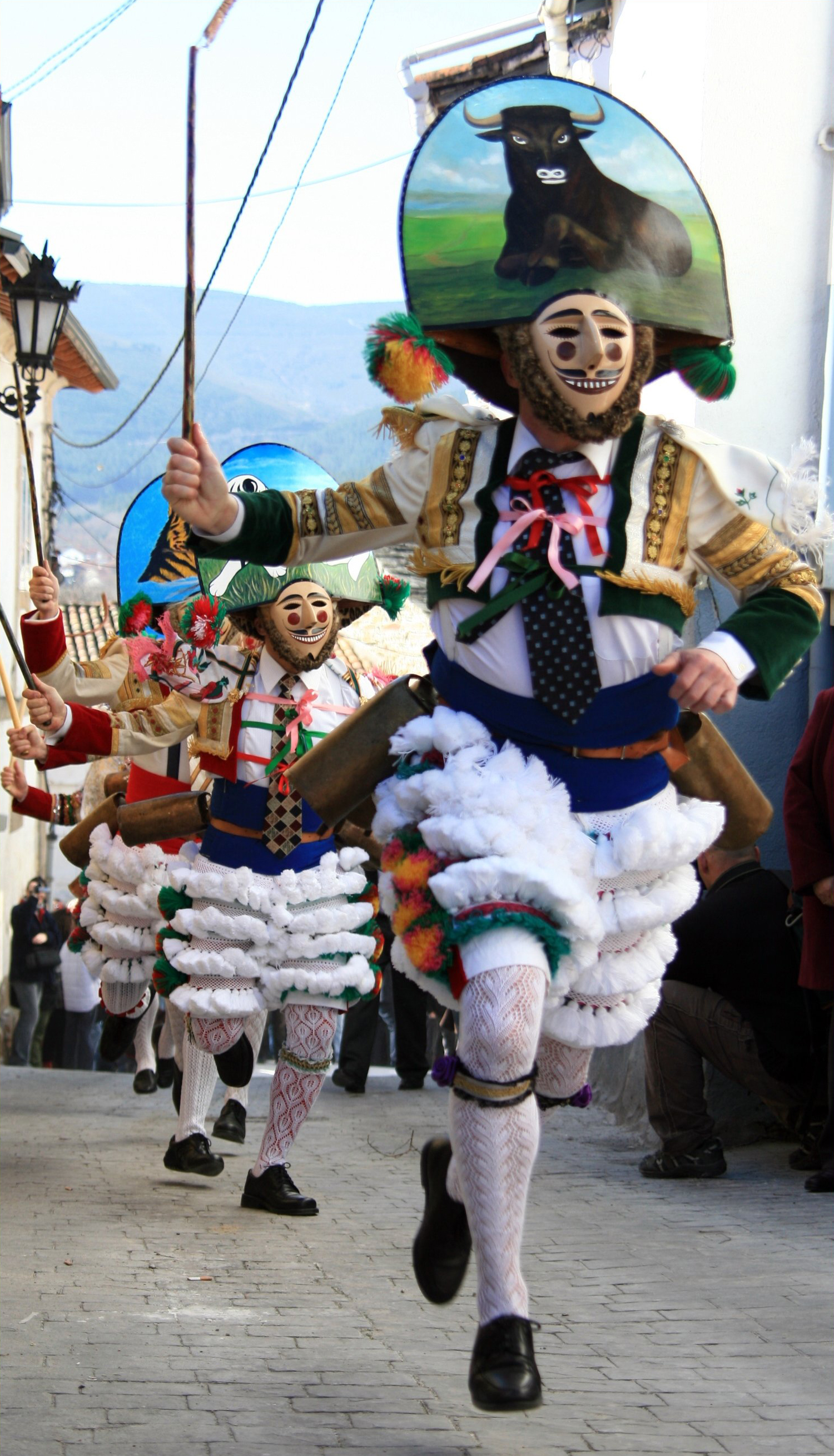
Entroido: Peliqueiros in Laza, arguably dressed as 16th century Castilian tax collectors

- Entroido, or Carnival, is a traditional celebration in Galicia, historically disliked and even forbidden by the Catholic Church. Famous celebrations are held in Laza, Verín, and Xinzo de Limia.
- Festa do Corpus Christi in Ponteareas, has been observed since 1857 on the weekend following Corpus Christi (a movable feast) and is known for its floral carpets. It was declared a Festival of Tourist Interest in 1968 and a Festival of National Tourist Interest in 1980.
- Arde Lucus, in June, celebrates the Celtic and Roman history of the city of Lugo, with recreations of a Celtic weddings, Roman circus, etc.
- Bonfires of Saint John, Noite de San Xoan or Noite da Queima is widely spread in all Galician territory, celebrated as a welcome to the summer solstice since the Celtic period, and Christianized in Saint John's day eve. Bonfires are believed to make meigas, witches, to flee. They are particularly relevant in the city of Corunna, where it became Fiesta of National Tourist Interest of Spain. The whole city participate on making great bonfires in each district, whereas the centre of the party is located in the beaches of Riazor and Orzan, in the very city heart, where hundreds of bonfires of different sizes are lighted. Also, grilled sardines are very typical.
- Rapa das Bestas ("shearing of the beasts") in Sabucedo, the first weekend in July, is the most famous of a number of rapas in Galicia and was declared a Festival of National Tourist Interest in 1963. Wild colts are driven down from the mountains and brought to a closed area known as a curro, where their manes are cut and the animals are marked, and assisted after a long winter in the hills. In Sabucedo, unlike in other rapas, the aloitadores ("fighters") each take on their task with no assistance.
- Festival de Ortigueira (Ortigueira's Festival of Celtic World) lasts four days in July, in Ortigueira. First celebrated 1978–1987 and revived in 1995, the festival is based in Celtic culture, folk music, and the encounter of different peoples throughout Spain and the world. Attended by over 100,000 people, it is considered a Festival of National Tourist Interest.
- Festa da Dorna, 24 July, in Ribeira. Founded 1948, declared a Galician Festival of Tourist Interest in 2005. Founded as a joke by a group of friends, it includes the Gran Prix de Carrilanas, a regatta of hand-made boats; the Icarus Prize for Unmotorized Flight; and a musical competition, the Canción de Tasca.
- Festas do Apóstolo Santiago (Festas of the Apostle James): the events in honor of the patron saint of Galicia last for half a month. The religious celebrations take place 24 July. Celebrants set off fireworks, including a pyrotechnic castle in the form of the façade of the cathedral.
- Romería Vikinga de Catoira ("Viking Festival of Catoira"), first Sunday in August, is a secular festival that has occurred since 1960 and was declared a Festival of International Tourist Interest in 2002. It commemorates the historic defense of Galicia and the treasures of Santiago de Compostela from Norman and Saracen pirate attacks.
- Feira Franca, first weekend of September, in Pontevedra recreates an open market that first occurred in 1467. The fair commemorates the height of Pontevedra's prosperity in the 15th and 16th centuries, through historical recreation, theater, animation, and demonstration of artistic activities. Held annually since 2000.
- Festa de San Froilán, 4–12 October, celebrating the patron saint of the city of Lugo. A Festival of National Tourist Interest, the festival was attended by 1,035,000 people in 2008. It is most famous for the booths serving polbo á feira, an octopus dish.
- Festa do marisco (Seafood festival), October, in O Grove. Established 1963; declared a Festival of National Tourist Interest in the 1980s.
- Bullfighting has no tradition at all in Galicia. In 2009 only 8 corridas, out of the 1,848 held throughout Spain, took place within Galicia. In addition, recent studies have stated that 92% of Galicians are firmly against bullfighting, the highest rate of the country, even more than Catalonia. Despite this, popular associations, such as Galicia Mellor Sen Touradas-Galicia Better without Bullfights, have blamed politicians for having no compromise in order to abolish it and have been very critical of local councils', especially those governed by the PP and PSOE, payment of subsidies for corridas.

== See also ==
- Outline of Spain
- Celtic nations
- Celts
- Ethnic groups in Europe
- Galician music
- Galician mythology
- Galician nationalism
- Galician people
