= Xabarín Club =

Galician children's television programme

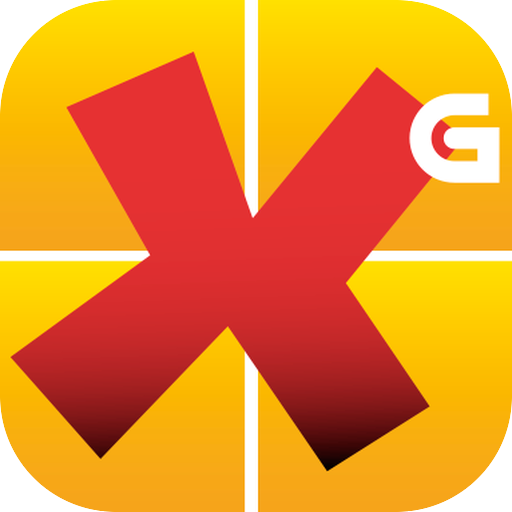
- Genre: Children's television
- Created by: Suso Iglesias; Toñito Blanco; Teresa Seara
- Directed by: Alberte Casal; Francisco Carballés
- Starring: Juanillo Esteban (voice of Xabarín); Carlos Portela; Manuel Manquiña; Silvia Superstar; Manolo Romón; Luís Tosar; Xavier Viana
- Country of origin: Spain
- Original language: Galician

Production
- Executive producers: Rosa Lorenzo; Loli Fraga

Original release
- Network: Televisión de Galicia (TVG / tvG2)
- Release: 18 April 1994 – present

Xabarín Club is a children's and youth television programme broadcast by Televisión de Galicia (TVG), the public broadcaster of the autonomous community of Galicia in northwestern Spain. It has aired continuously since 18 April 1994, making it one of the longest-running children's programmes in Spanish television history. Its mascot is an anthropomorphic wild boar (xabarín, the Galician word for wild boar) designed by cartoonist Miguelanxo Prado and voiced by Juanillo Esteban.

The programme combines animated series, predominantly Japanese anime acquired through the Federation of Autonomous Radio and Television Organizations (FORTA), with music videos, segments of original production, and a membership club. By 2021, the club had reached a record 146,000 registered members, representing approximately 30% of all Galician children between 1994 and that year.

== History ==
=== Origins ===
Xabarín Club launched on 18 April 1994, nearly a decade after TVG itself went on air on 24 July 1985. Although TVG had carried children's content before, it was not broadcast on a regular schedule. The concept for Xabarín Club arose from an internal commission to create a dedicated children's programming block that would also function as a social membership club, a format already proven successful in the United States with programmes such as the Mickey Mouse Club and Cartoon Network.

The programme originally featured a band of five pig characters (Clodio, Tareixa, Uxía, Xonxa, and Carolo) led by the Xabarín himself, an unusual choice for the genre, which had traditionally used human presenters.

=== The Xabarín Generation ===
In the second half of the 1990s, Xabarín Club became a significant cultural phenomenon among Galician children, a cohort that would later be collectively referred to as the Xeración Xabarín (Xabarín Generation). Alongside animated series, the programme featured an extensive soundtrack of music videos by Galician rock groups associated with the bravú movement and the Movida viguesa, including Killer Barbies, Siniestro Total, Os Diplomáticos de Monte-Alto, Aerolíneas Federales, Os Resentidos, and Heredeiros da Crus, as well as acts from Lusophone countries. This music was compiled into A cantar con Xabarín, a series of five CDs. In 1998 the programme held live concerts known as Xabaxiras, attended by thousands of children across Galicia.

In 1999, Xabarín Club broadcast Os vixilantes do Camiño, the first animated series produced in Galicia, a 2D production by Miguelanxo Prado and Suso Iglesias set along the Camino de Santiago and featuring the programme's characters. It comprised 13 episodes of 26 minutes and an 80-minute feature film, later released on DVD by TVG in 2008.

=== Redesign and later developments ===
In 2007, to mark its 13th anniversary, the programme relaunched with a new visual identity for the Xabarín character and added new segments including Xabarín Informa, a brief daily news slot aimed at young viewers.

In 2013, Hobby publisher Agalip released OINK!, a comics and youth literature magazine based on the programme, licensed from TVG and featuring contributors including Miguelanxo Prado, Kiko da Silva, Marilar Aleixandre, and others. Five monthly issues were published at €3 each before a crowdfunding campaign on Verkami fell short of its €36,000 target in early 2014.

From 2 February 2009, the programme moved to tvG2, the second channel of TVG. On 2 December 2016, a dedicated online stream, Xabarín TV, launched as a continuous playlist of the programme's content, later accompanied by a mobile application.

In March 2019, the programme celebrated its 25th anniversary with a concert at the Sala Capitol in Santiago de Compostela.

=== Iniciativa Xabarín ===
In 2020, A Mesa pola Normalización Lingüística, a Galician language advocacy organization, launched a petition called the Iniciativa Xabarín calling for expanded Galician-language children's programming and the creation of a dedicated Xabarín channel. After gathering more than 33,000 signatures, the initiative was brought before the Parliament of Galicia, which approved it unanimously on 11 May 2021. The approved proposal included the creation of a third TVG channel dedicated to children and youth content around the clock, and the inclusion of Galician-language content on Televisión Española platforms.

Following the vote, CRTVG expanded its digital children's offerings. On 17 January 2024, these were consolidated into AGalega, a new on-demand digital platform with over 1,400 original titles at launch.

== Membership club ==
A Xabarín Club membership card, featuring the wild boar character designed by Miguelanxo Prado.

A characteristic feature of Xabarín Club is its membership scheme. Upon joining, members receive a club card, have their photograph shown on the programme on their birthday, receive an annual birthday postcard, and can participate in prize draws.

Membership grew rapidly from launch: 15,000 members were registered by September 1994, five months after broadcast began, rising to 40,000 by November 1995 and 66,000 by 1996, at which point the club had members in every municipality in Galicia. By 1999, membership stood at 90,000, representing 25% of Galician children at the time. The figure exceeded 110,000 by the programme's tenth anniversary in 2004, reached 138,000 in 2013, and peaked at a record 146,000 in 2021.

== Selected Galician productions ==
- Os vixilantes do Camiño (1999) — first animated series produced in Galicia
- Os Bolechas (2012)
- As aventuras de Minchi
- Os Axóuxeres
- Bibopalula
- O sabedoiro
- Os contos do camiño
- Manda Truco
- Pipo (2025)

== Selected international series ==
Xabarín Club has broadcast a large number of international animated series over its run, acquired primarily through FORTA from Japanese and European producers. A selection of the most notable titles includes:

- Dragon Ball Z
- Dragon Ball GT
- Dragon Ball Kai
- One Piece
- Detective Conan (broadcast as O detective Conan)
- Neon Genesis Evangelion (broadcast as Evangelion)
- Doraemon (broadcast as Doraemon, o gato cósmico)
- Sailor Moon
- Shin-chan
- Samurai Champloo
- Heidi
- Looney Tunes
- Tom and Jerry
- The Pink Panther Show (broadcast as A Pantera Rosa)
- Totally Spies!
- ReBoot
- Spirou and Fantasio
- The Adventures of Tintin

== Awards and recognition ==
Year	Award	Result
1994	Premio Galicia de Comunicación	Won
1996	Premios AGAPI — Best Television Programme	Won
1997	Premio Ourense — Best Initiative for Galician Comics	Won
1998	Premio TV Joven (UNESCO / Conseil International du Cinéma et de la TV)	Won
2012	Premios Mestre Mateo — Premio de Honra Fernando Rey	Won
2021	Premios Rebulir da Cultura Galega	Won

== See also ==
- Televisión de Galicia
- Galician language
- Bravú
- Aerolineas Federales
