= Germán Coppini =

Spanish singer-songwriter (born 1961)

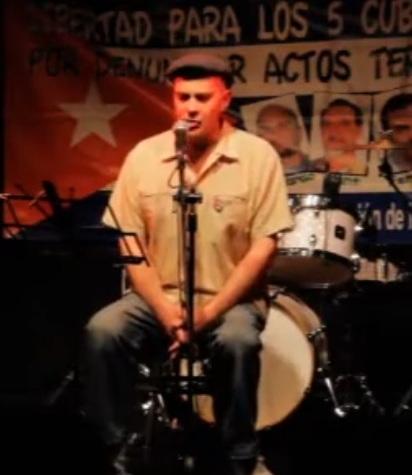
- Born: Germán Coppini López-Tormos; 19 November 1961; Santander, Cantabria, Spain
- Died: 24 December 2013 (aged 52); Madrid, Spain
- Occupation: Singer-songwriter
- Years active: 1980–2013
- Spouse: Elvira Reig
- Children: 3
- Musical career
- Genres: Sophisti-pop; new wave; post-punk; punk rock; latin music
- Instrument: Vocals
- Formerly of: Siniestro Total; Golpes Bajos; Anónimos; Lemuripop

Germán Coppini López-Tormos (19 November 1961 – 24 December 2013) was a Spanish singer-songwriter. He is regarded as one of Spain's most influential musicians of the late 20th century as well as one of the country's best lyricists. A leading figure of the Movida Viguesa, he was a founding member of Galician bands Siniestro Total and Golpes Bajos.

Coppini started his musical career in Vigo in 1980 as the lead vocalist of the group Coco y los del 1.500, alongside guitarist Miguel Costas and drummer Julián Hernández. In 1981, Costas and Hérnandez changed the name of their other group, Mari Cruz Soriano y los que Afinan su Piano, to Siniestro Total, and added Germán as a vocalist, effectively dissolving their previous band. With Siniestro Total, Coppini released the EP Ayudando a los enfermos, (1981) their debut album ¿Cuándo se come aquí? (1982) and the single "Sexo chungo / Me pica un huevo" (1983). That same year, he formed the sophisti-pop band Golpes Bajos with former school mate Teo Cardalda, he was a member of both bands until that spring, when he left Siniestro Total. With Golpes Bajos he released an homonymous EP, with the songs "Malos tiempos para la lírica" and "No mires a los ojos de la gente," garnering them national attention and acclaim. Their debut album A Santa Compaña was released in 1984, with their last output, Devocionario, coming in 1985. In September of that same year the group announced its dissolution.

After the band's dissolution Coppini started an uneven solo career, he released three LPs, El Ladron de Bagdad (1987), the 70's soul cover's album Flechas Negras (1989) and latin-infused Carabás (1996). During this period he also collaborated with other artists such as Mecano's Nacho Cano, Alaska y Dinarama and Paco Clavel. In 1997, he reunited again with Cardalda to release another Golpes Bajos record Vivo, but the discreet commercial response made them abandon the project soon after.

Coppini continued collaborating with other artists, and formed the band Anónimos in 2003. Three years later he released the rarities album Las Canciones del Limbo with unreleased songs recorded from 1999 until 2004. That same year he collaborated with trio Maga, and in 2007, had them as an accompanying band playing mainly Golpes Bajos and Siniestro Total classics. He also formed the project Lemuripop alongside Alex Brujas, releasing an album, Todas las pérdidas crean nudos (2012). A compilation album, Huellas de una voz was also released that year, including his two first solo records and unreleased material. In 2013, he released his fourth solo album America Herida, and had plans for an album with band Néctar, but on Christmas Eve 2013 he died of liver cancer; the record, Semper Audax, was released posthumously in 2014.

== Early life ==
Germán Coppini López-Tormos was born on 19 November 1961 in Santander, Cantabria. His mother, Marga López-Tormos, was from Cantabria, His paternal grandparents were Italian immigrants who had settled in Barcelona, his paternal grandfather was from Milan and practised naturism. His father, Juan Coppini, worked for Nestlé, and was transferred to the factory in La Penilla, where he met Marga. They had three children, Germán, and his younger siblings, Cristina and Ernesto. Due to his father's job, Coppini moved around Spain, living in Madrid, Barcelona, and again Santander. His father fed his musical ambition by gifting him a record player, and bringing home records, which at first included Italian music, but also new wave, punk, and rock. As a child he was asked to sing during family reunions, but he was shy so he would go to another room and do it where no one could see him. As a teenager he realized his voice had potential, which made him overcome his shyness. Coppini spent his adolescence in Vigo where he attended Nebrija School, with Teo Cardalda. He recalled, that due to the lack of cultural offers: "Living in a place as remote as Vigo in those years was awful", but with the advent of Punk in the 70s the city started changing, and he would use the little money he had saved to buy records.

== Career ==
=== Early steps in music ===
As a teenager he formed Coco y los del 1.500, with his friends, the Soaje siblings. The siblings had a holiday home where the band would practise and write songs, "with joints and beers". As soon as they had their first songs they performed for the first time in León, supporting Los Cardiacos. The concert was "horrible" as was the audience response, but Coppini had a fun time nevertheless.

== Personal life ==
Coppini married Elvira Reig, a healthcare worker, and together they had three children: Guillermo, Daniel and Carmen. Even though he was born in Santander, he considered himself an adoptive Galician. Coppini died of liver cancer on 24 December 2013, aged 52, in Madrid.

=== Politics ===
Coppini was a registered member of the Communist Party of Spain (marxist-leninist). In the 2011 Spanish general election he ran in third place in the ballot of the party "Republicanos" to the Congress of Deputies in Madrid.

== Discography ==
Solo

- El ladrón de Bagdad (1987)
- Flechas negras (1989)
- Carabás (1996)
- América herida (2013)
- Semper Audax (2014)
- Quimera (2016)

Compilation albums

- Las canciones del limbo (2006)
- Huellas de una voz (Volumen 1) (2012)

Siniestro Total

- Ayudando a los enfermos (EP, 1981)
- ¿Cuándo se come aquí? (1982)

Golpes Bajos

- Golpes Bajos (EP, 1983)
- A Santa Compaña (1984)
- Devocionario (EP, 1985)
- Vivo (1997)
