= Echo chamber =

Hollow enclosure used to produce reverberated sounds

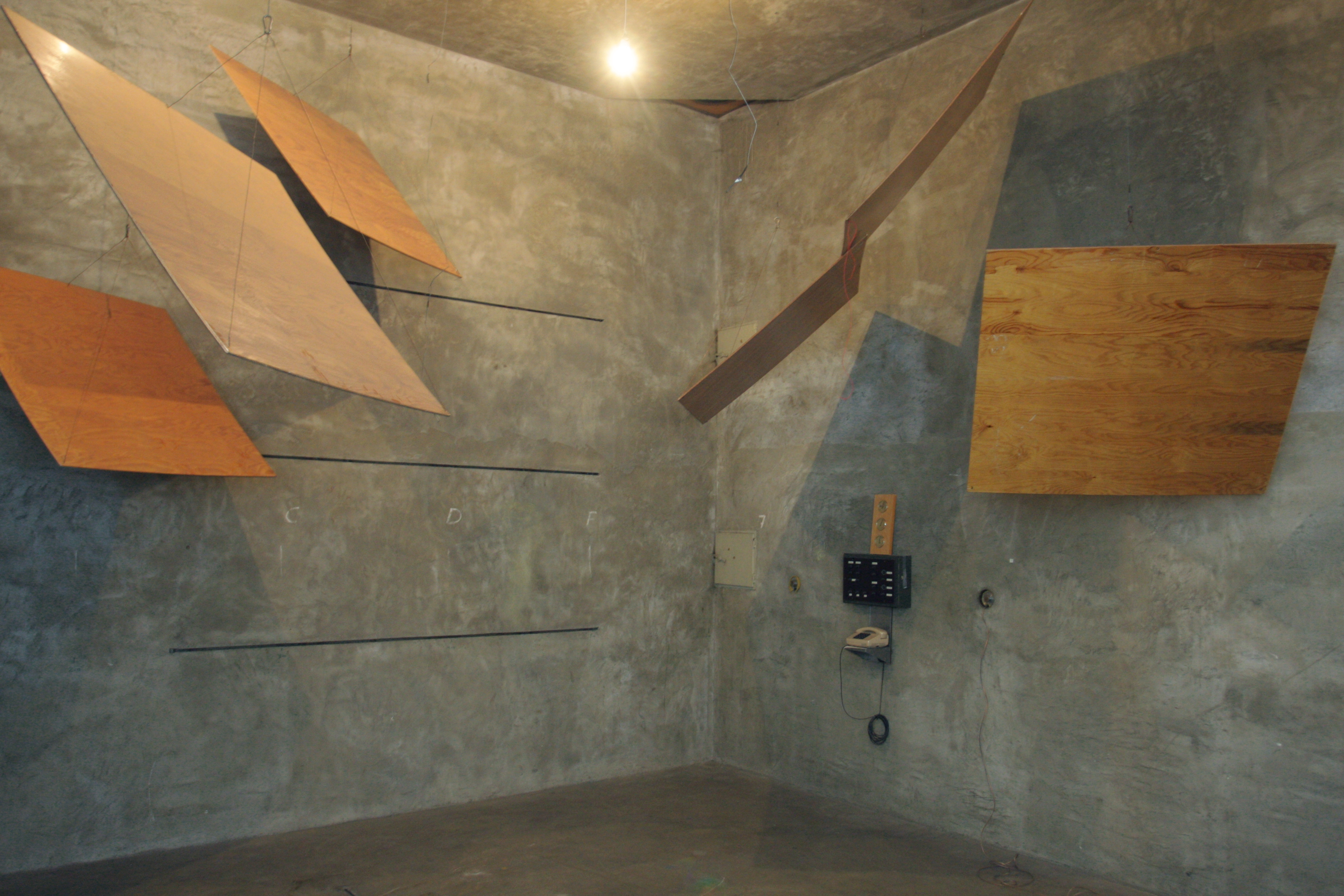
Echo chamber of the Dresden University of Technology

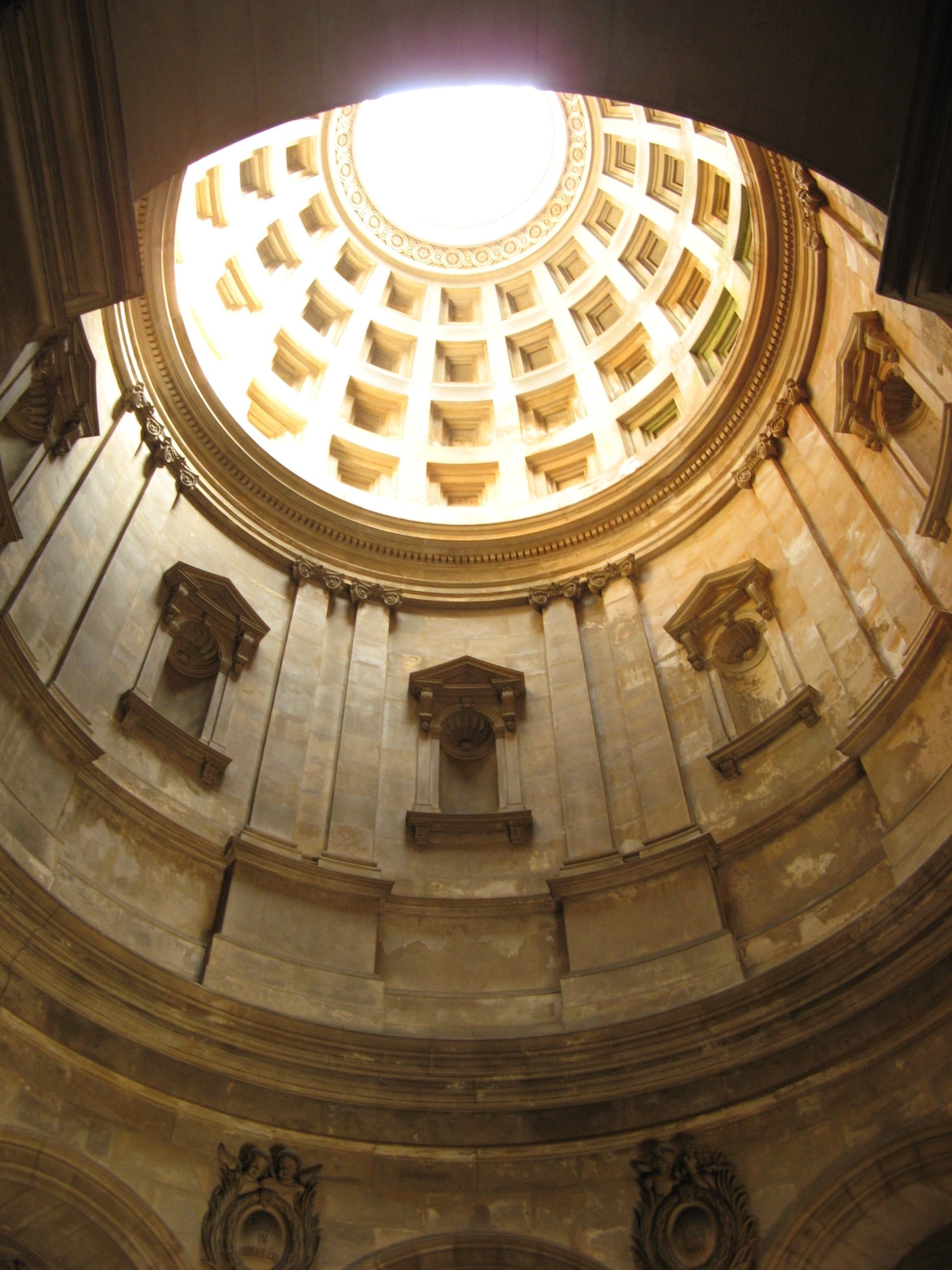
Hamilton Mausoleum has a long-lasting unplanned echo.

An echo chamber is a hollow enclosure used to produce reverberation, usually for recording purposes. A traditional echo chamber is covered in highly acoustically reflective surfaces. By using directional microphones pointed away from the speakers, echo capture is maximized. Some portions of the room can be moved to vary the room's decay time. Nowadays, effects units are more widely used to create such effects, but echo chambers are still used today, such as the famous echo chambers at Capitol Studios.

In music, the use of acoustic echo and reverberation effects has taken many forms and dates back many hundreds of years. Sacred music of the Medieval and Renaissance periods relied heavily on the composers' extensive understanding and use of the complex natural reverberation and echoes inside churches and cathedrals. This early acoustical knowledge informed the design of opera houses and concert halls in the 17th, 18th, and 19th centuries. Architects designed these to create internal reflections that would enhance and project sound from the stage in the days before electrical amplification. Sometimes echo effects are the unintentional side effect of the architectural or engineering design, such as for the Hamilton Mausoleum in Scotland, which has one of the longest reverberation times of any building.

== Electro-acoustic ==
Developments in electronics in the early 20th century—specifically the invention of the amplifier and the microphone—led to the creation of the first artificial echo chambers, built for radio and recording studios. Until the 1950s, echo and reverberation were typically created by a combination of electrical and physical methods.

Acoustically speaking, the "classic novel" echo chamber creates echoes in the same way as they are created in churches or caves—they are all simply large, enclosed, empty spaces with floors and walls made of hard materials (such as polished stone or concrete) that reflect sound waves well. The basic purpose of such chambers is to add colour and depth to the original sound, and to simulate the rich natural reverberation that is a feature of large concert halls.

The development of artificial echo and reverberation chambers was important for sound recording because of the limitations of early recording systems. Except in the case of live performances, most commercially popular recordings are made in specially constructed studios. These rooms were both heavily insulated to exclude external noises and internally somewhat anechoic—that is, they were designed not to produce any internal echoes or sound reverberation.

Because virtually every sound in everyday life is a complex mixture of direct sound from the source and its echoes and reverberations, audiences naturally found the totally 'dry' and reverberation-free sound of early recordings unappealing. Consequently, record producers and engineers quickly came up with a method of adding "artificial" echo and reverberation that experts could control with a high degree of accuracy.

Producing echo and reverberation in this form of echo chamber is simple. A signal from the studio mixing desk—such as a voice or instrument—is fed to a large high-fidelity loudspeaker located at one end of the chamber. One or more microphones are placed along the length of the room, and these pick up both the sound from the speaker and its reflections off the walls of the chamber. The farther away from the loudspeaker, the more echo and reverberation the microphone(s) picks up, and the louder the reverberation becomes in relation to the source. The signal from the microphone line is then fed back to the mixing desk, where the echo/reverberation-enhanced sound can be blended with the original 'dry' input.

An example of this physical effect can be heard on the 1978 David Bowie song "Heroes", from the album of the same name. The song, produced by Tony Visconti, was recorded in the large concert hall in the Hansa recording studio in Berlin, and Visconti has since been much praised for the striking sound he achieved on Bowie's vocals. Visconti placed three microphones at intervals along the length of the hall: one very close to Bowie, one halfway down the hall, and the third at the far end of the hall. During the recording, Bowie sang each verse progressively louder than the last, and as he increased volume in each verse, Visconti opened up each of the three microphones in turn, from closest to farthest. Thus, in the first verse, Bowie's voice sounds close, warm, and present; by the end of the song, Visconti has mixed in a large amount of signal from all three microphones, giving Bowie's voice a strikingly reverberant sound.

The original echo chamber at EMI's Abbey Road Studios was improved by Clive Robinson, site foreman at the time of construction. His construction and engineering teams perfected the echo booth at Abbey Road Studios in London. It was one of the first studios in the world to be specially built for recording purposes when it was established in 1931; it remains in place and is a prime example of the early 20th-century electro-acoustic echo chamber.

Buildings such as churches, church halls, and ballrooms have often been chosen as recording sites for classical and other music because of their rich, natural echo and reverberation characteristics. Famous examples include Sir George Martin's AIR Studios at Lyndhurst Hall in Belsize Park, London, a large, vaulted 19th-century building originally constructed as a church and missionary school. Montreal's Church of St. Eustache is the favored recording venue of the Montreal Symphony Orchestra and many others and is much sought after for classical recordings because of its unique acoustic characteristics. The distinctive reverberation on the early hit records by Bill Haley & His Comets was created by recording the band under the domed ceiling of Decca's studio in New York City, located in a former ballroom called The Pythian Temple.

Some recording companies and many small independent labels could not afford large purpose-built echo chambers such as the Abbey Road Chamber, so enterprising producers and engineers often made use of any large reverberant space. Corridors, lift-wells, stairwells, and tiled bathrooms were all used as substitute echo chambers. Many famous soul music and R&B music recordings released by the New York-based Atlantic Records feature echo and reverb effects produced by simply placing a speaker and microphone in the office bathroom—a process also used by Producer/Engineer Bruce Botnick while recording The Doors for their 1971 album L.A. Woman.

== Electronic echo machines ==
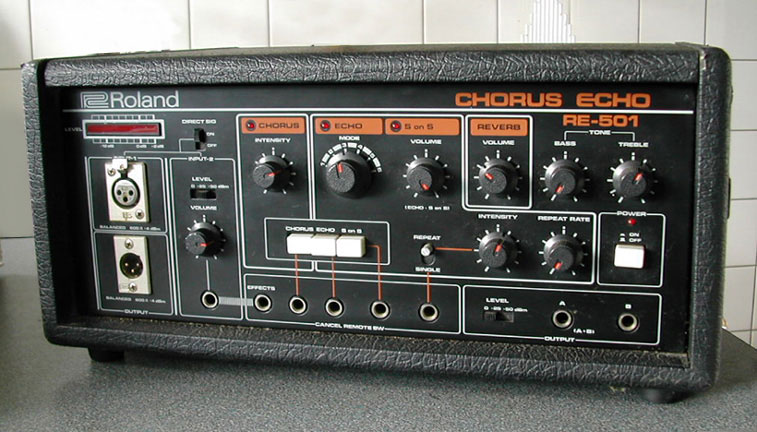
The Roland RE-501 is an audio effects device capable of creating echo, chorus, reverb and sound on sound type effects.

In the 1950s and 1960s, the development of magnetic audio tape technology made it possible to duplicate physical echo and reverberation effects entirely electronically. The Watkins Copicat, designed and built by renowned British electronics engineer Charlie Watkins in the late 1950s, is typical of this kind of electronic delay device.

Tape echo units use an endless loop of magnetic tape, which is drawn across a series of recording and playback heads. When a signal from a voice or instrument is fed into the machine, it records the signal onto the tape loop as it passes over the record head. As the tape advances, the newly recorded signal is then picked up by a series of playback heads mounted in line with the record head. These play the sound back as the signal passes over each head in turn, creating the classic rippling or cascading echoes that are typical of tape echo units.

The number of playback heads determines the number of repeats, and the physical distance between each playback head determines the ratio of delay between each repeat of the sound (usually some fraction of a second). The actual length of the delay between each repeat can be varied by a pitch control that alters the speed of the tape loop across the heads.

Typically, the playback heads of tape echo machines are also connected to controls that allow the user to determine the volume of each echo relative to the original signal. Another control (sometimes called "regeneration") allows the signal from the playback heads to be fed back into and variably mixed with the original input signal, creating a distinctive "feedback" effect that adds more and more noise to the loop with each repeat. If fully activated, this control ultimately produces a continuous feedback loop of pure noise. Roland manufactured various models of magnetic tape echo and reverb sound effect machines from 1973 until the introduction of digital sound effect machines.

A tape echo that has few repeats and a very short delay between each repeat is often referred to as a "slapback" echo. This distinctive sound is one of the key sonic characteristics of 1950s rock and roll and rockabilly, and can be heard on the classic mid-50s Sun Records recordings by Elvis Presley and others. This effect was a result of the unintentional combination of the recording and monitoring tape heads (physically located a few inches apart), which, on playback, created a gap that inadvertently produced the iconic "slap-back" effect.

=== Digital echo ===
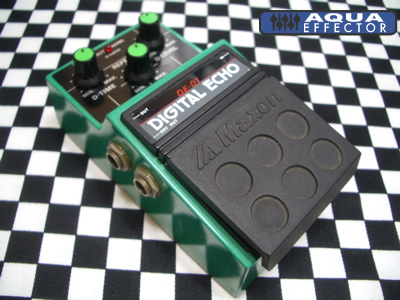
Maxon DE-01 digital echo sound effect pedal

With the advent of digital signal processing and other digital audio technologies, it has become possible to simulate almost every "echo chamber" effect by processing the signal digitally. Because digital devices are able to simulate an almost limitless variety of real reverberant spaces as well as replicate the classic tape-based echo effects, physical echo chambers fell into disuse. However, as noted above, naturally reverberant spaces such as churches continue to be used as recording venues for classical and other forms of acoustic music.

== See also ==
- Anechoic chamber
- Bathroom singing
- Delay (audio effect)
- Reverberation room – an echo chamber for scientific measurement (acoustics)
- Telephone game
