= A Santa Compaña =

Studio album by Golpes Bajos
- Released: 30 July 1984
- Recorded: March–April 1984
- Studio: Audiofilm, Madrid; Estudis Perpinyà, Barcelona (Note: Track Seven)
- Genre: Sophisti-pop; new wave; post-punk
- Length: 29:57
- Label: Nuevos Medios
- Producer: Luis Fernández Soria; Teo Cardalda; Pablo Novoa

Golpes Bajos chronology
Golpes Bajos (1983)	A Santa Compaña (1984)	Devocionario (1985)

Singles from A Santa Compaña
- 1. "Colecciono Moscas" Released: 1984; 2. "Fiesta de los Maniquíes" Released: 1984; 3. "Escenas Olvidadas" Released: 1985

Retrospective professional ratings
Review scores
Source	Rating
La Fonoteca	5/5 stars
Mondo Sonoro	9/10

A Santa Compaña is the debut studio album by Galician pop band Golpes Bajos, released on 30 July 1984 by Nuevos Medios. It was written by band frontman Germán Coppini and keyboardist Teo Cardalda. It was produced in Madrid and Barcelona by Luis Fernandez Soria, Cardalda, and guitarist Pablo Novoa. The album artwork depicts all four band members, wearing traditional Galician women's clothing, standing on a field of rocks, except for Coppini, who is sitting at their feet. Its title refers to the Santa Compaña, a Galician folk myth.

A Santa Compaña mainly features a sound that embodies Sophisti-pop, post-punk, new wave, as well as elements of Latin music. It also draws influence from Italian pop and bossa nova.

== Background ==
The album was written by band founders Germán Coppini and Teo Cardalda, it was produced by Luis Fernandez Soria, Cardalda, and guitarist Pablo Novoa at Audiofilm studios in Madrid, with a cover of Italian track Come Prima, being recorded at Estudis Perpinyà in Barcelona.

== Track listing ==
All tracks are written by Germán Coppini and Teo Cardalda, except where noted

A Santa Compaña track listing
No.	Title	Writer(s)	Length
1.	"Escenas Olvidadas"		4:05
2.	"Hazme un Nueve"		3:05
3.	"Hansel y Gretel"		2:27
4.	"Colecciono Moscas"	Coppini; Pablo Novoa	4:38
5.	"A Santa Compaña"		3:12
6.	"Cena Recalentada"		3:31
7.	"Come Prima"	Mario Panzeri; Vincenzo Di Paola; Sandro Taccani	2:13
8.	"La Reclusa"		3:22
9.	"Fiesta de los Maniquíes"		3:15
Total length:			29:57

== Personnel ==
Credits adapted from liner notes.

Golpes Bajos

- Germán Coppini – lead vocals and percussion
- Teo Cardalda – piano, guitar, drums, synthesizer, percussion, backing vocals
- Pablo Novoa – piano, guitar, synthesizer, percussion, keyboards, sampler Fairlight CMI
- Luis García – bass

Technical

- Luis Fernández Soria – production, engineering
- Teo Cardalda – production
- Pablo Novoa – production
- Josep Lluís Perpinyà – engineering (Barcelona)

Artwork

- Germán Coppini – idea
- Francis Montesinos – design
- Paco Navarro – photography
