= Heredeiros da Crus =

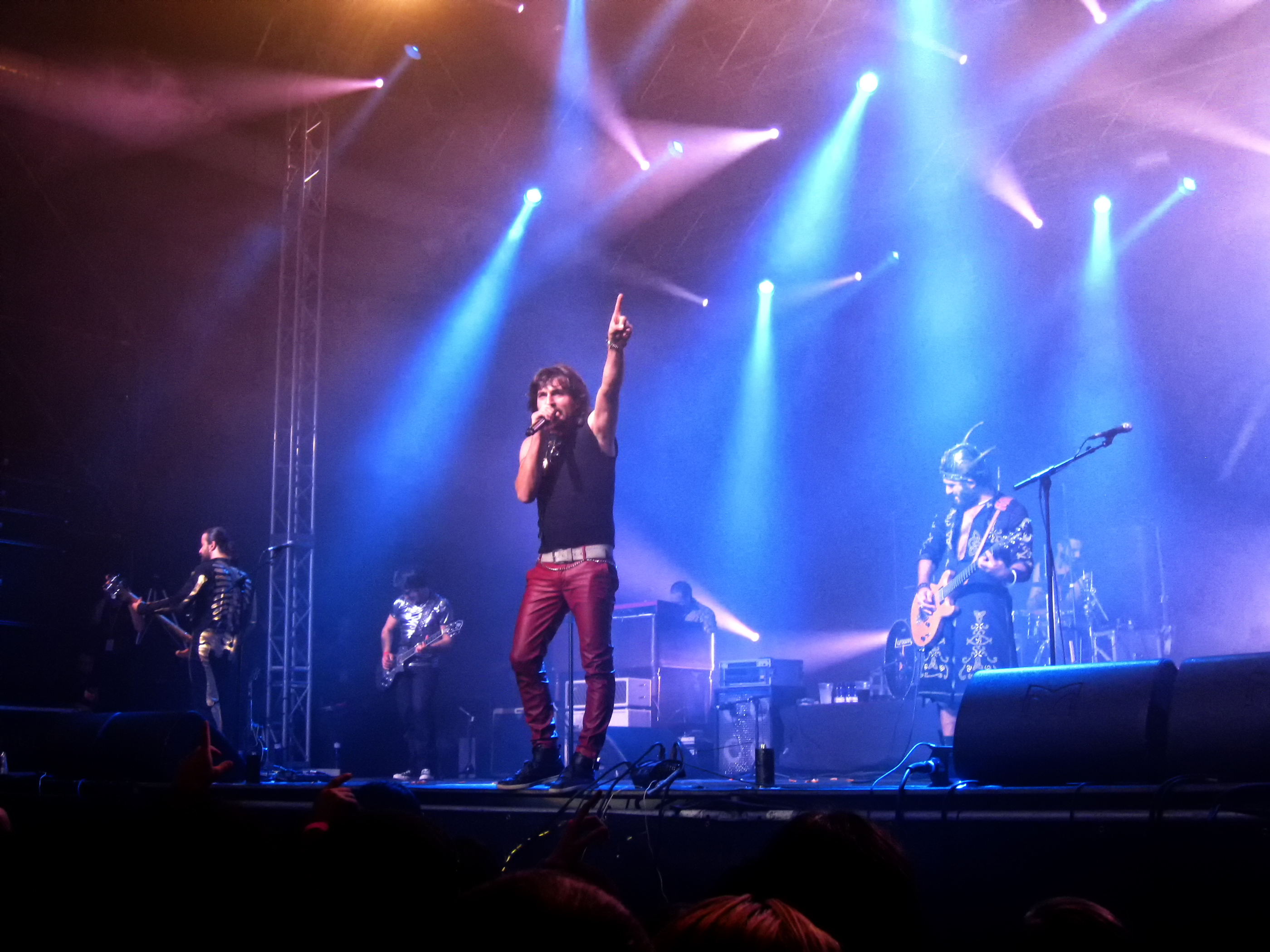

Background information
- Origin: Ribeira, Galicia
- Genres: Rock, rock and roll
- Years active: 1991–2007; 2012–present
- Labels: Xurelo Roxo, BOA music.
- Members: Singer: Francisco Javier Vázquez Maneiro Jarfuxo, O Fillo da necha Main guitar: Antonio Novo Suárez, Tuchiño. Second guitar:Antonio Ageitos Ares Tonhito de Poi; Bass: Francisco Javier Velo Cambeiro O Jran Fran; Drum: Avelino (1991–1994); José Manuel Santamaría Medín (1994–1999); Marcos Otero (1999–2004); Pedro Rodríguez Trelles (2004–2005)

Heredeiros da Crus is a Galician rock and roll band formed in 1992 by Antón Axeitos (Tonhito de Poi) in Ribeira, A Coruña. The rest of the band members were Antonio Novo (Tuchiño) as main guitarist, Francisco Velo (O Jran fran) playing the bass and the frontman and singer Javier Vazquez Maneiro (Jarfuxo). Several drummers have played in the band from the moment of its foundation; the last one was Pedro Rodriguez-Trelles, but before him Avelino, Benito, Pepe Santamaria(Medín) and Marcos have performed this task.

In 1994 they released their first album, "A cuadrilla de Pepa a Loba". Many of the songs from this album got soon very successful among the galician youth of the 90s, such as Quero josar or R7/O Jran batacaso, but its real popularity came thanks to the single Que jallo é that was emitted in the children's program Xabarín Club.

The main musical influences of the band were the Rock and Roll classics, specially The Rolling Stones (favourite band of Tuchiño, main writer of the songs). Nevertheless, talking about the themes of their songs, the appearance of the band and their lyrics, they would look more alike to AC/DC.

With the album "Está que te cajas" Heredeiros da Crus became one of the best-selling Galician rock bands of all time, and their success was confirmed. They also recorded the live album "All Right Chicago", and became the first Galician band to record a DVD (Chicarrón). Moreover, their international touring (Portugal, New York City, London, Barcelona, Asturias, etc.) had a good acceptance and attendance.

In 1997, Heredeiros da Crus was one of the bands who collaborated in the album L'asturianu muévese, with their single Frenaso no calsonsillo adapted as Frenazu nel calzonciellu (recorded to promote the asturian language, with the collaboration of Xune Elipe.

After the separation of the band in 2007, several members have started new projects. Pepe Santamaria works as a session drummer in the United Kingdom, Javi Maneiro is now leading the band Jabón Blue, while Tonhito de Poi has formed A banda de Poi and later Rasa Loba. In 2009 Tuchiño came back to the rock scene with a new band called "Recambios Tucho". They play mainly covers from 70's and Heredeiros' songs.

From the very moment the band split up, several rumors have emerged about their comeback but none of them was officially confirmed until 2012, when coinciding with the 20th anniversary of their first gig, they joined for a new concert. After the success of that performance they announced the band would take part in several music festivals during that Summer, events that would confirmate their return and deliverance of the band's 9th album, Jard Rock con Fé.

== Discography ==
- A Cuadrilla de Pepa a Loba (1994)
- Recambios Tucho
- Está que te cajas (1996)
- Criatura (1997)
- Des minutos (1998)
- Elecciones Munisipales (1999)
- All Right Chicago (doble directo) (2000)
- Chicarrón (2004)
- Jard Rock con Fé (2013)

== See also ==
- Siniestro Total
- Los Suaves
- Bravú
