= Charlie Watkins (sound engineer) =

British audio engineer (1923–2014)

- Born: Charles Watkins; 28 June 1923; London, England
- Died: 28 October 2014 (aged 91); Balham, London, England

Charlie Watkins (28 June 1923 - 28 October 2014) was a British musician, inventor, and entrepreneur best known as the founder of Watkins Electric Music and a pioneer of sound reinforcement systems for rock concerts. Watkins was the first to build PA systems with multiple slaved solid state amplifiers driving various loudspeaker stacks, beginning with the Windsor Festival in 1967.

== Early life ==
Watkins was born in London in 1923. He enlisted in the Merchant Navy with his brother Reg, serving during the Battle of the Atlantic. While serving in the Merchant Navy, Watkins began playing accordion, and after returning home following World War II, Watkins played professionally for several years.

== Career ==
In 1949, Watkins and his brother Reg opened Watkins Electric Music, a record shop in Tooting Market, London. Two years later the brothers relocated the shop to Balham and began selling accordions and guitars. Realizing the increasing need for guitarists to be able to amplify their instrument for live performances, Watkins experimented with building amplification systems for acoustic guitars. Encouraged by the popularity of Skiffle music, Watkins designed and introduced the Westminster guitar amplifier in 1954, later followed up by the V-fronted Dominator.

In 1958, inspired by the Marino Marini Quartet's song "Come prima", Watkins had the idea for a simple, affordable, portable tape echo unit. With the help of engineer Bill Purkis, the Watkins Copicat was designed and manufactured. Watkins' shop sold the entire first production run of 100 Copicats on the first day, including the very first Copicat sold to Johnny Kidd of Johnny Kidd & the Pirates, whose guitarist used it on the group's UK hit song "Shakin' All Over". The Copicat would become one of the company's most successful products, with various different Copicat models released over more than 50 years. By the end of the 1950s, Watkins' company, now branded with a shortened acronym of WEM, was one of the top 3 companies of the U.K. music trade, selling guitar amps, echo units, and a line of solid-body electric guitars designed by his brother Reg.

In 1965, Watkins was contacted by the promoter for the Byrds, who offered to pay Watkins £100 to build a sound reinforcement system for the band's highly publicized British tour. Interested in expanding his business into pro audio equipment, Watkins assembled a system of speakers and 30-watt amplifiers, but the resulting sound system performed poorly and the tour was not well-received due to group illness, inconsistent musicianship, and lackluster stage presence.

Determined to design an effective sound reinforcement system more powerful than what was available at the time, Watkins had the idea of adding together multiple slaved solid state amplifiers to drive stacks of loudspeakers, resulting in the WEM SL100 slave amplifier. Additionally, he had WEM's designers create a PA mixer with built-in equalization and outputs for the slave amplifiers. In 1967, he approached Marquee Club owner and Windsor Jazz & Blues Festival organizer Harold Pendleton with an offer to design and build a 1000-watt system (far more powerful than any PA system at that time) that would make it possible for the famous festival to expand its audience size significantly. Pendleton accepted, and Watkins delivered the 1000-watt system in time for the event. The PA system was so loud that local residents complained to the authorities, who leveled charges against Watkins and attempted to regulate the volume of the festival. Watkins was later defended in court by the Right Honourable Quintin Hogg, where the case was dismissed.

Watkins' PA mixer, which was modified during the festival to allow adjustment of the input sensitivity, resulted in a WEM product, the Audiomaster, in 1968.

Watkins' company's kilowatt-range PA systems became standard for British music festivals, including Stones in the Park in July 1969, the Isle of Wight Festival in 1969 and 1970, and the Glastonbury Festival. Watkins also provided the PA system for Janis Joplin's performance at the Royal Albert Hall in April 1969, with the singer announcing to the audience how pleased she was with the sound of her voice that night. Watkins established friendships with many of the musicians who used his equipment, including Jimi Hendrix, David Bowie, and Marc Bolan. In 1974, in the wake of controversy surrounding the dangers of sound levels at concerts, Watkins decided to shut down Watkins Electric Music and returned to playing the accordion. He continued to invent, developing new accordions, accordion amplifiers, and MIDI accordion systems.

In 2011, Watkins was awarded the Audio Pro International Lifetime Achievement Award for his groundbreaking approach to loudspeakers and PA for outdoor rock events. He died at his home in Balham in 2014 at the age of 91.
