= Antón Reixa =

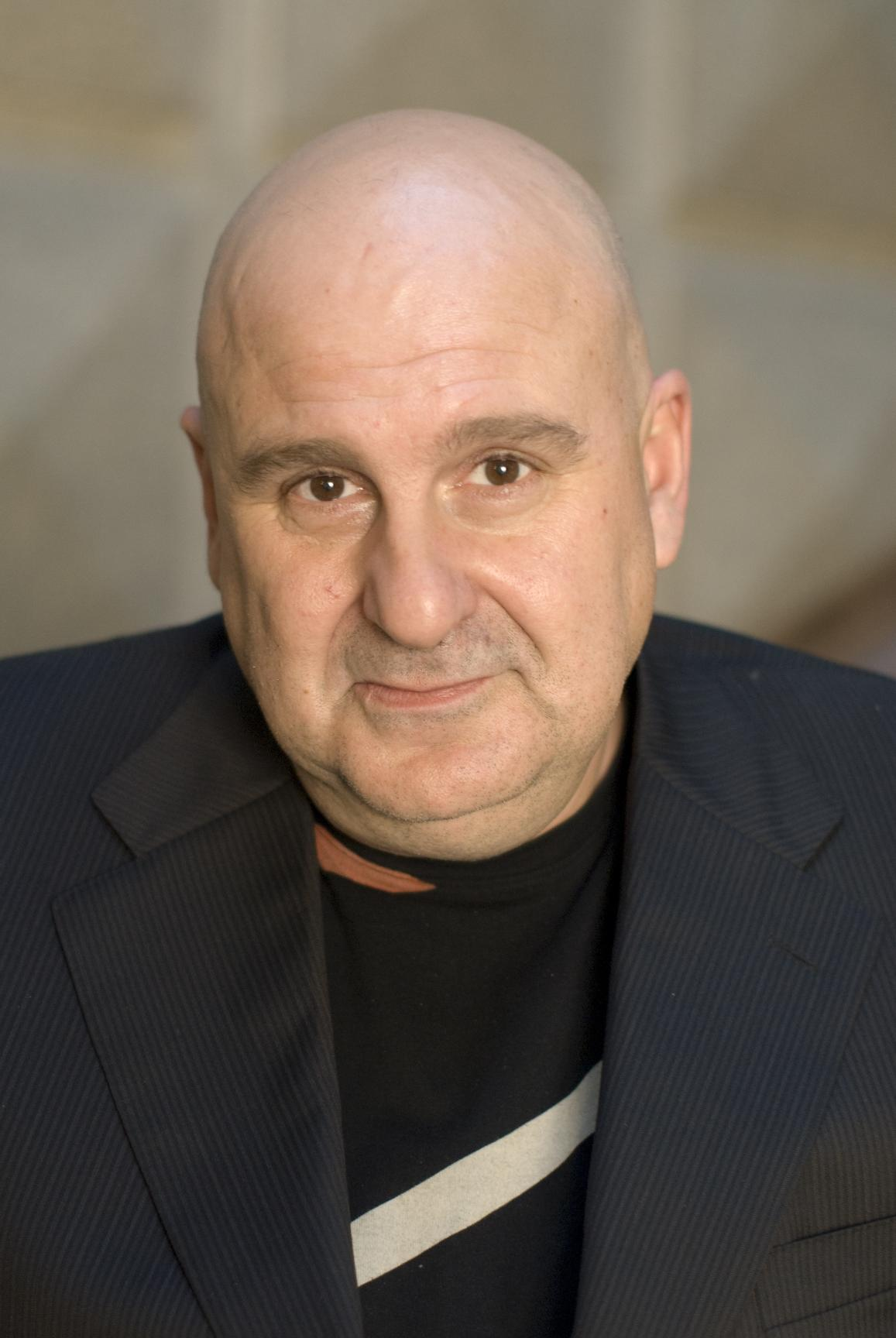
- Antón Reixa in 2007
- Born: Antonio Javier Eulogio Rodríguez Reija; April 17, 1957 (age 69); Vigo, Galicia, Spain
- Occupations: Poet, writer, musician, producer, director
- Known for: Grupo Rompente, Os Resentidos, *Mareas Vivas*
- Awards: Gold Medal of Merit in the Fine Arts (2021)

Antón Reixa (born in Vigo, 17 April 1957) is a Spanish poet, writer, musician, film and television director, and audiovisual producer. He is considered one of the leading figures of contemporary Galician culture and language, known for pioneering experimental poetry and rock music in the Galician language.

== Biography ==
Reixa was born in Vigo, Galicia. He studied Galician Philology at the University of Santiago de Compostela, where he became involved in avant-garde literary movements. In 1975, he co-founded the poetic collective Grupo de Comunicación Poética Rompente alongside Alberto Avendaño and Manolo Romón. The group's work combined dadaist influences with social critique and experimental performance.

In 1982, he founded the Galician rock band Os Resentidos, a key part of the cultural movement known as the Movida viguesa. The band is best known for their song Fai un Sol de Carallo (also known as Galicia Caníbal), which became a generational anthem. Their 1990 album Jei was named Best National Album by the Spanish magazine Rockdelux.

In the late 1990s, Reixa focused on audiovisual projects. He directed the popular TVG series Mareas Vivas and several films, including El lápiz del carpintero (2002), based on the novel by Manuel Rivas, and Hotel Tívoli (2007).

From 2012 to 2013, he served as president of the Spanish Society of Authors and Publishers (SGAE). In December 2021, Reixa received the Gold Medal of Merit in the Fine Arts, awarded by the Spanish Ministry of Culture and Sport, in recognition of his cultural contributions.

== Works ==
=== Poetry and literature ===
- Silabario da turbina (1978), with Grupo Rompente
- As ladillas do travesti (1979)
- A dama que fala (1983), with Grupo Rompente
- Michigan / Acaso Michigan (2018)
- Melancoholemia: vida de mamarracho (2020)

=== Music ===
- With Os Resentidos:
  - Fai un sol de carallo (1986)
  - Jei (1990)
- With Nación Reixa:
  - Alivio Rápido (1994)
  - Safari Mental (1997)

=== Film and television ===
- Mareas Vivas (TV series, 1998–2002)
- El lápiz del carpintero (2002)
- Hotel Tívoli (2007)
