= Bravú =

Galician rock music movement

Bravú (also known as Rock Bravú) is a Galician musical and cultural movement that originated in 1994, influenced by traditional Galician music and punk rock. A loose network of bands rather than a unified genre, many originating from sparsely populated rural areas of Galicia (Galicia profunda), it collectively asserted that the Galician language was a viable medium for rock music at a time when this was widely contested.

== History ==
=== Origins ===
The movement originated in Galicia in the early 1990s, inspired by anti-globalization sentiment and the regional musical precedents of the Movida viguesa and the Galician folk revival of the late 1980s. Bands drew influence from international acts such as The Clash, Mano Negra, and The Pogues, as well as Basque Radical Rock groups like Kortatu, alongside traditional Galician folk musicians. The movement challenged the prevailing assumption that Galician was a language suited only to folk and traditional music, not rock.

The term Bravú was officially coined in 1994 during the second edition of the Castañazo Rock festival in the hamlet of Viana, Chantada, at a gathering in a local tavern known as the Caballero de Viana. The word, meaning the characteristic smell and taste of uncastrated wild game meat, was chosen as a metaphor for an untamed, authentic and culturally resistant spirit. Founding bands present at this gathering included Os Diplomáticos de Monte-Alto from A Coruña and Os Rastreros from Chantada, alongside Os Impresentables de Vimianzo.

=== Development and mainstream visibility ===
The movement gained visibility through the popular Galician children's television program Xabarín Club, broadcast on TVG from 1994 to 2009. The program's use of music videos from Bravú-associated bands exposed the sound to a generation of Galician youth and helped normalize the use of the Galician language in popular music. The movement addressed concerns of Galician youth including unemployment, opposition to military service, and critiques of local political power structures, while also engaging with rural issues such as opposition to European Community milk production quotas, most notably in Os Rastreros' song "Tractorada."

The movement celebrated its 20th anniversary in 2014 at the Revenidas Festival in Vilaxoán, an event supported by the Galician regional government's cultural agency, the Agadic, which featured founding bands including Os Diplomáticos de Monte-Alto, Heredeiros da Crus, and Os Rastreros. In 2024, Nós Television released the documentary BRAVÚ XXX, marking the movement's 30th anniversary.

=== Legacy and critical reception ===
Scholar José Colmeiro identified the movement as a significant example of cultural hybridity, characterizing it as existing between the "rurban" and the "glocal," affirming Galician cultural identity while integrating modern international influences. Journalist Noel Feáns has credited Bravú with normalizing the Galician language in popular music more broadly. Critics have also noted the movement's internal tensions; journalist Iago Martínez argued that Bravú reproduced an idealized vision of rural Galician culture that excluded the urban experience and carried totalizing cultural ambitions.

Xurxo Souto, the founder of Os Diplomáticos de Monte-Alto and the movement's principal theorist, has reflected on the scene's shortcomings, particularly the near-total exclusion of women from the performing ranks, acknowledging that female musicians such as the members of As Gharotas da Ribeira and singer Mercedes Peón were largely marginalized at the time.

== Music ==
Bravú is a synthesis of punk rock and traditional Galician folk music, typically fast and loud, utilizing the standard rock setup of drums, overdriven guitars, and bass, often supplemented by traditional instruments including the Galician bagpipe (gaita) and accordion. The upright double bass was also featured in some acts. Lyrically, the music is almost entirely in Galician and frequently employs a sarcastic, humorous, and socially conscious tone addressing political and economic issues specific to the region.

Notable artists associated with the movement include Os Diplomáticos de Monte-Alto, Os Rastreros, Heredeiros da Crus, Os Papaqueixos, Yellow Pixoliñas, Pinto d'Herbón, Os Skornabois, Os Resentidos, and Ruxe Ruxe. Several of these acts, including Heredeiros da Crus and Yellow Pixoliñas, initially rejected the Bravú label despite being closely associated with the scene.

== Related media ==
The Bravú magazine was the main publication for the movement, with its first issue distributed alongside the compilation CD Selección Xa! in 1997. The Selección Xa! and Unión Bravú compilations brought together acts from across the scene. The 2024 documentary BRAVÚ XXX, produced by Nós Television, is the most comprehensive audiovisual record of the movement to date.

== See also ==
- Movida viguesa
- Basque Radical Rock
- La Movida Madrileña
- Xabarín Club
