= A Mesa pola Normalización Lingüística =

Social movement that defends the Galician language

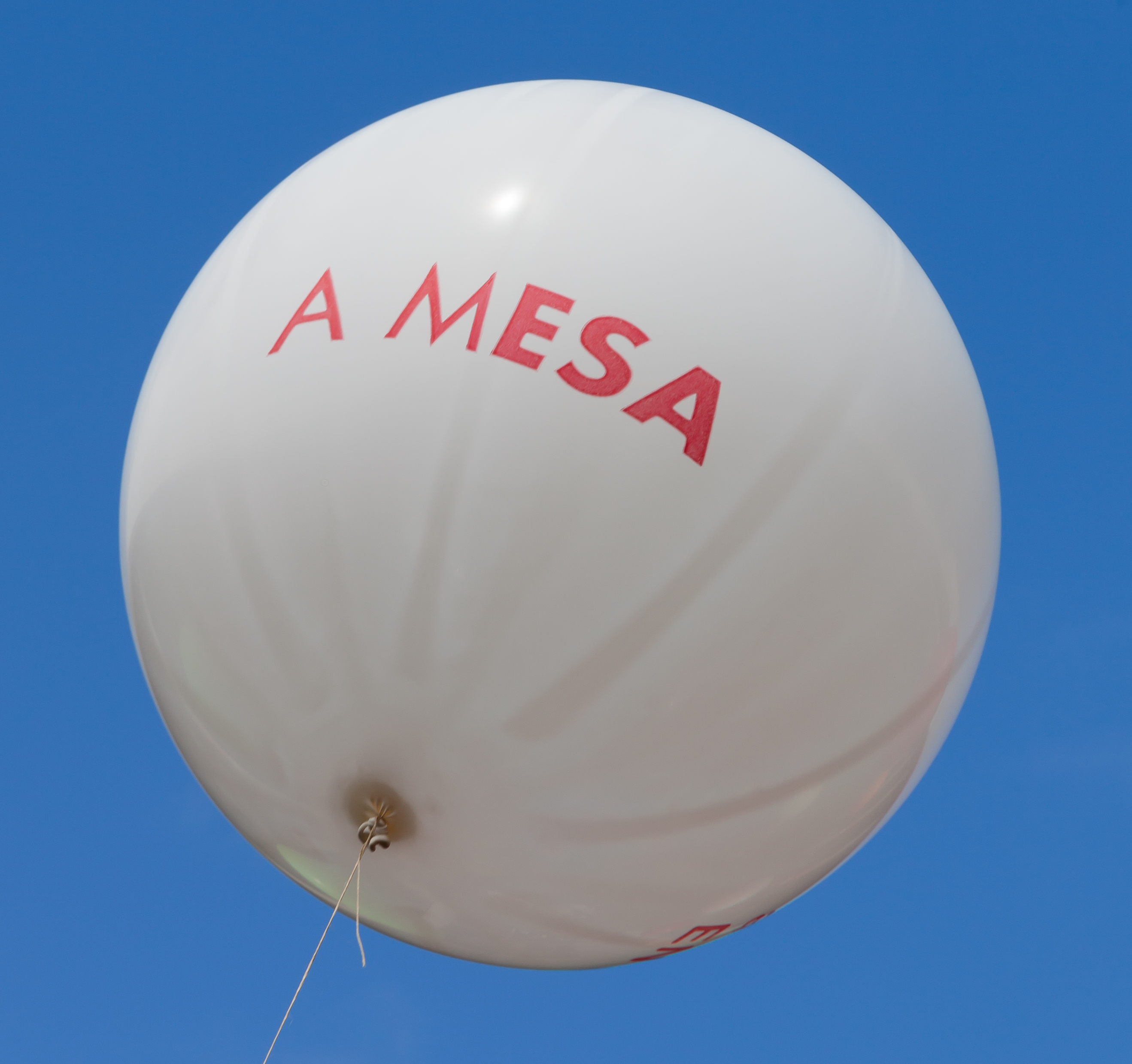

A Mesa pola Normalización Lingüística or, more commonly, A Mesa (English: Roundtable/Board for Linguistic Normalization) is a citizen platform and social movement, founded in 1986, that defends the Galician language, its public use and the linguistic rights of the Galician-speaking population. The main actions of the platform are demonstrations, boycotts, public pressure and public acts. The main goal of A Mesa is to fight against the linguistic policy of the People's Party of Galicia, especially through the movement Queremos Galego. Its president is Marcos Maceira.

== History and campaigns ==
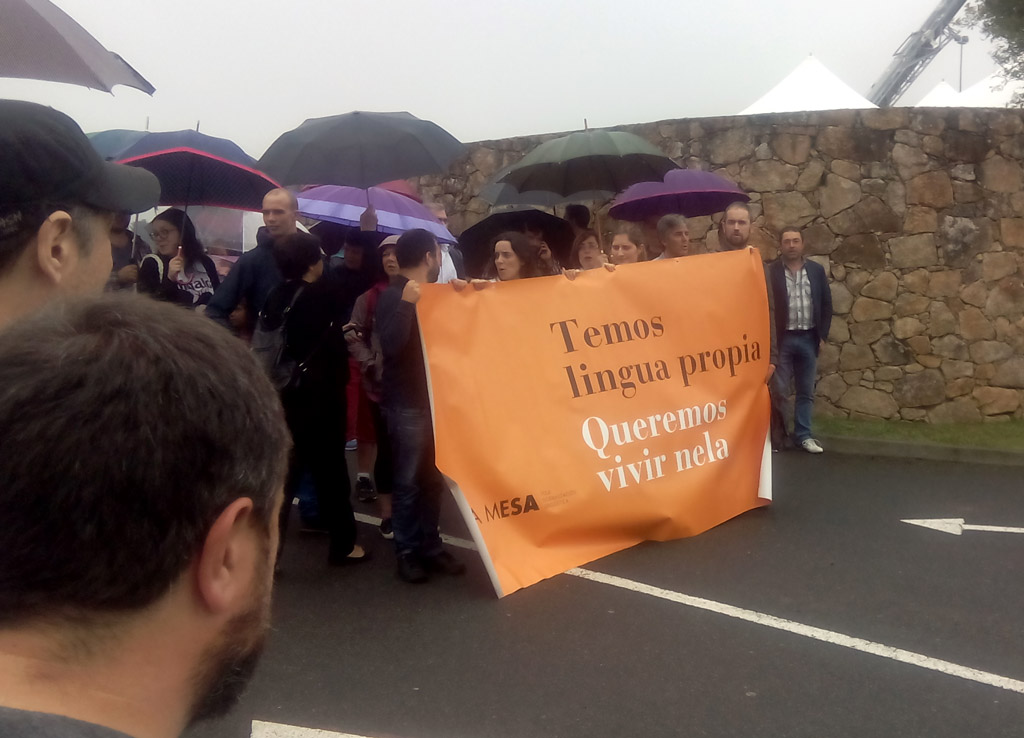

A Mesa was created after the "Meeting about the current state of linguistic normalization", held in 1986, and attended by the Galician Writers Association, Social and Pedagogical Galician Association, Federation of Cultural Associations and the Galician Language Association. Its first president was Xosé Manuel Sarille.

One of the main, and more successful, campaigns of the association was the SEAT Arosa one. SEAT used the unofficial, deturpated and unpopular toponym "Arosa", instead of the native and official Arousa, to name one of its cars. After much social pressure the car model was renamed SEAT Arousa.

The association also had a long fight with the 1985–2007 mayor of A Coruña, Paco Vázquez, over the lack of use of Galician language in the municipality of A Coruña and over its anti-Galician positions.

Another important event was the campaign in favour of expanding the use of Galician language in the magistrature. Despite being official and the language of the majority of the Galician people, Galician is almost never used in the judicial system.

== See also ==
- Galician language
- Diglossia
- Queremos Galego
