= La historia del blues =

Studio album by Siniestro Total
- Released: 2000
- Genre: Blues rock
- Label: Parlophone

Siniestro Total chronology
Sesión vermú (1997)	La historia del blues (2000)	¿Quiénes somos? ¿De dónde venimos? ¿A dónde vamos? (2002)

La Historia del Blues (History of Blues) is a concept album by the Spanish band Siniestro Total, released in 2000. The album tells the story of Jack Griffin, a fictional African-American musician. Siniestro Total use Griffin's life as a means to chronicle both the evolution of blues during the 20th century and "the recent history of the United States, with all of its wonders and all of its atrocities".

== Jack Griffin's story ==
Jack Griffin was born in the late 1800s in a cotton plantation on the banks of the Mississippi delta. As a young boy, Griffin was fascinated by the blues music played by itinerant bands, to the extent that the devil (which in this story adopts the name of Nick LeFreak) offers him a deal: eternal life and extraordinary musicianship in exchange for devoting his existence to spread blues (the devil's music, according to tradition) throughout the nation. Griffin accepts, but soon his attention shifts to other types of music (such as Tex-Mex, gospel, or rap) that LeFreak doesn't approve of. Considering that the contract has been breached, LeFreak starts tracking Griffin to collect his soul, but Griffin always seems to be one step ahead. He spends a large portion of his life criss-crossing the United States in a desperate flight from LeFreak, and always producing new music with different bands wherever he goes. From his home in Mississippi, he moves to Chicago, St Louis, Texas, California, and finally, New York City.

In a final confrontation in New York City in 1999, Griffin manages to shoot LeFreak to death, but is arrested and sentenced to die in the electric chair. In his final moments, he realizes that the priest standing next to him is the devil in a new body. He also realizes that the path he has taken in his travels traces a cross over the map of the United States, a sign that his life and death had been preordained, and that he is only a pawn in the struggle between Good and Evil. The devil calls Griffin a traitor and, before flipping the switch, lets him know that Evil will continue into the new millennium.

== Track listing ==
Even though the songs are presented as covers of original songs by Jack Griffin, they are all original compositions by Siniestro Total, with the only exception of track #3, Coleguita. The following list includes both the title of the fictitious original songs as well as the name of the equally fictitious bands that Griffin was a member of at the time.

1. La rabia de vivir, cover of Crazy Blues #2 by Bobby Jr. and the Dirty Old Men (1928).
2. Llueve, cover of It's raining by Cryin' Shame and the Stormy Tuesday Big Band (1949).
3. Coleguita, cover of the song by Zydeco Pierre and his Broken Accordions (1955).
4. Vuelvo hacia el hogar, cover of Going home by Barbacoa Lorenzo and the Red Hot Coals (1931).
5. ¿A quién vas a culpar?, cover of Who's to blame by Boycott Lynch (1944).
6. Bajo sus propias pistolas, cover of the song by the same name by Perfecto Mundo y su Mariachi (1961).
7. Llevadme a mi Tejas natal, cover of Take me to my Lone Star Country by Total Disaster (1966).
8. Inundación, cover of Highwater by Jack Griffin (1938).
9. El enanito y las tres blancanueces, cover of The Little Dwarf and the Three Snownuts by Luigi and the Wise Guys (1970).
10. Ni sí, ni no, cover of No Tits, no Love by Green Express (1975).
11. Mata al malo y pilla a la chica, cover of Kill the Bad Guy and Get the Girl by Neutron Smith (1988).
12. Dios tiene un plan, cover of God's Got a Plan by Reverend Griff Jackson (1999).

== Narration ==
During the live performances in the promotional tour of the album, each song was preceded by a monologue by actor Manuel Manquiña describing Jack Griffin's desperate flight from Satan and the circumstances that had led him to compose that particular song.
