= Golpes Bajos =

Spanish pop band

- Origin: Vigo, Galicia, Spain
- Genres: Sophisti-pop; new wave; art pop; post-punk
- Years active: 1982–1986, 1997–1998
- Label: Nuevos Medios
- Spinoff of: Siniestro Total
- Past members: Germán Coppini; Teo Cardalda; Pablo Novoa; Luis García

Golpes Bajos (lit. Low Blows) was a Galician pop band formed in Vigo, Galicia, in 1982. Founded by lead singer Germán Coppini and keyboardist Teo Cardalda, the band was originally a duet until 1983, when they were joined by guitarist Pablo Novoa, and bassist Luis García. They were one of the main groups of the Movida Viguesa, a period, that alongside the Movida Madrileña, would later be known as the "Edad de Oro del Pop Español", i.e. "The Golden Age of Spanish Pop Music". They were active in 1982–1986, with a final reunion tour in 1997–1998.

== History ==
=== Formation and early years (1982) ===
Singer and songwriter Germán Coppini and multi-instrumentalist and composer Teo Cardalda met as teenagers while attending Colegio Nebrija in Vigo, Pontevedra. They were part of a class were most students had been expelled from other schools. They became friends due to their similar taste in music, Coppini recalled that they liked punk and sinister music, but also black and Latin music like Motown and Fania. In 1982, Coppini, at the time lead singer of lead singer of punk band Siniestro Total, reconnected with Cardalda and in September of that year they hung out at Cardalda's house with the intention of making a cover of The Who's I Can't Explain. By October the duo had their first demo, recorded at Cardalda's garden shed. Cardalda's father decides to send the demo to a new band's contest organised by the musical publication Rock Espezial—later known as Rockdelux—before knowing the result, the duo had already given their first concert and added guitarist Pablo Novoa, who Cardalda had as a bandmate on Druida and Trenvigo, and bassist Luís García. They won the contest, and Mario Pacheco, head of label Nuevos Medios travels to Vigo to meet them after hearing their songs on the radio. Coppini gives the demo tape to the head of signing, who does so immediately.

=== First EP and national breakout (1983) ===
After winning the contest, Mario Pacheco, head of label Nuevos Medios travels to Vigo to meet them after hearing their songs on the radio. Coppini gives the demo tape to the head of signing, who does so directly. Shortly after they record their homonymous Extended Play at Audiofilm studios in Madrid. The sessions were done on a weekend, 20 and 21 May 1983. The EP was self-produced, and included three tracks from the demo tape, "Estoy Enfermo", "No mires a los ojos de la gente" and "Malos tiempos para la lírica", the latter, inspired by Bertolt Brecht's homonymous poem. Coppini's cavernous voice was a result of a cold, but Pacheco liked it so much that advised him to keep it. The EP was a commercial and critical success, leading them to appear on TVE's musical program La Edad de Oro a reference point for the cultural movement of La movida, and having a strong demand for live shows. Coppini, who was juggling his work between Siniestro Total and Golpes Bajos, was asked to leave Siniestro a day after his appearance on La Edad de Oro, after failing to mention his involvement with the band on television. From this point Coppini abandons Siniestro and devotes himself completely to Golpes Bajos.

=== A Santa Compaña (1984) ===
In 1984 the band releases their first record A Santa Compaña, once again recorded at Audiofilm in Madrid, with Luis Fernández Soria, Cardalda and Pablo Novoa as producers. The album's title comes from the Galician folk myth of the Santa Compaña, with a cover that also represents Galicia, as a way to bridge punk music with traditional culture. The album recovers one track from their first demo tape, "Colecciono Moscas", and contains a cover of Italian pop track Come Prima. The album is noted for its mix of pop music, post punk and Latin sounds. During this time Coppini and Cardalda move to Madrid, meanwhile García and Novoa remain in Vigo.

=== Devocionario (1985) ===
In 1985 the band releases their second EP and last record with the original line-up, Devocionario, recorded at frequent studio Audiofilm in Madrid and produced by the band and once again Luis Fernández Soria. This album contains string arrangements by Cardalda and Joan Albert Amargós. The EP's main themes are religion, spirituality and myths, going in a much darker and theatrical direction both lyrically and sonically, compared to their previous album. Novoa and García were not as keen on this new direction as Cardalda and Coppini but accepted it more as time went on. The tour for the EP ended in September 1985, during La Mercè, with a concert in Barcelona where the band publicly announced its dissolution.

=== Disbandment and aftermath (1985–1997) ===
"Things have a time, logic and determined duration. You can't do what most modern groups have done, and keep beating a dead horse. They don't even believe themselves in it. I rather be noble. If there's not good vibes between band members, then there's no way yo can do anything, why the fuck should we continue".

— Coppini on the band's break up.

After releasing the mini-LP "Devocionario", the founding duo decided to dissolve the group, and moved to other music projects. Some of the reasons for the end of the band were that, Novoa and García remained in Vigo, while Cardalda and Coppini went onto record the album alone in Madrid. Nuevos Medios' owner Mario Pacheco recommended Cardalda to work on other projects which angered Coppini, who wanted him to be centered on the band. The issues between them grew, due to advice from third parties for them to start solo careers. Them getting more involved in their respective romantic partners, was also decisive in their break up. Journalist Xavier Valiño pointed out, "It's not that their partners were influencing their decisions, rather that they were not listening only to one another anymore." Their rift began during the production of their second album and got worse by the end of the third, to the point where they had separate dressing rooms while they were on tour. In 1987, Coppini began his solo career. He made a brief collaboration with Nacho Cano "Dame un chupito de amor" ("Give me a shot of love", Ariola, 1986). Coppini then opted for riskier musical terrain: "El ladrón de Bagdag" ("The Thief of Baghdad", 1987), "Flechas Negras" ("Black Arrows", 1989) and "Carabas" (1996). After a brief interlude with the experimental "Desfigurat" (1987) for a choreography by César Gilabert, Teo Cardalda launched a new career as a producer. Then, he formed a new band, Duendes, later known as Cómplices, along with his partner, María Monsonís, launching a career that gave him many commercial successes over the next decade.

=== Vivo: Reunion and final dissolution (1997–1999) ===
In November 1997, Coppini and Cardalda reunited to record a television documentary directed by the Basque filmmaker Juanma Bajo Ulloa. They re-released songs from their golden age in a live album "Vivo" ("Alive"), which they presented in a tour that began in March 1998. Neither García nor Novoa were invited. When the tour, which was a resounding failure, ended, Cardalda decided to return to Cómplices, finally ending the history of Golpes Bajos. Coppini was not aware that Novoa and García were not invited at first, describing the collaboration as being, "between Teo and his manager", he felt uncomfortable and disliked most of the others elements of the project, from the "exorbitant caché" imposed by the recording company, the artistic arrangements, to the choice of guest musicians. A multinational label was supposed to run with the basic costs of the album, but they stepped down at the last moment, making Coppini, and label Nuevos Medios monetarily responsible for it. This resulted in Coppini not being able to release music for a while. Novoa, was angry at Coppini and Cardalda for not being called to collaborate on the album, and completely severed his relationship with both for a long period. Nevertheless, Novoa and Coppini were able to reconcile before the latter's death, he also reconnected with Cardalda later on and are still on good terms with one another. Coppini died without re-establishing his friendship with Cardalda, saying on his last interview: "I avoid him." He also recalled not being in contact with Luis García since "he had left the music industry".

== Style ==
Valiño said the band knew how to unite their different influences: punk music from Coppini, progressive rock from Cardalda and Novoa and funk from Luis García, with British pop, black music, post-punk, as well as Latin genres such as Salsa. The defining traits of the band were Cardalda's vibrant instrumentals mixed with Coppini's introspective lyrics and theatrical cadence. Coppini's lyrics have been described as pessimistic and mature. He explained his fixation with religion as a lyrical theme came from a "very spiritual period" where he was inspired by mystical figures such as Teresa of Ávila and Augustine of Hippo. Some of the bands they were inspired by on their early years were The Stranglers and The Who. On their first album, the influences were: Chic, Peter Gabriel, Japan, The Cure, and Aztec Camera.

== Legacy ==
The band influenced other Galician artists such as Iván Ferreiro, Baiuca and Carlangas.

== Records ==
=== Albums ===
- A Santa Compaña (Nuevos Medios, 1984)
- Vivo (Nuevos Medios, 1998)

=== EPs ===
- Golpes Bajos (Nuevos Medios, 1983)
- Devocionario (Nuevos Medios, 1985)

=== Singles ===
- Colecciono Moscas – 1984 Fiesta de los Maniquíes – 1984
- La Virgen Loca – 1985
- Desconocido – 1985
- Cena Recalentada – 1990
- Malos Tiempos para la Lírica – 1998

=== Compilations ===
- Todas Sus Grabaciones 1983/1985 (Nuevos Medios, 1991)
