= Watkins Copicat =

Audio effects unit

The Watkins Copicat is an effects unit that produces tape delay effects. One of the first commercially available tape delay units, the original Copicat model was produced by Watkins Electric Music beginning in 1958. The Copicat became one of Watkins' most successful products, and the company produced various Copicat models and versions over the following decades.

== History ==
In 1960, inspired by the tape echo unit on the Marino Marini Quartet's "Come prima", Charlie Watkins, co-founder of London music shop Watkins Electric Music, had the idea for a simple, affordable, portable tape delay unit. With the help of engineer Bill Purkis, Watkins designed the Watkins Copicat, a compact (12-inch by 8-inch) valve-based tape echo unit with three replay heads and selector switch, and a feedback loop for a variable echo-repeat effect.

Watkins' shop sold the entire first production run of 100 Copicats on the first day; the very first Copicat was sold to Johnny Kidd of Johnny Kidd & the Pirates, and appeared on their hit "Shakin' All Over".

The Copicat, which preceded other major European echo units like the Binson Echorec, Meazzi Echomatic, and Vox Echo Deluxe, would become one of the company's most successful products, with Watkins releasing various different Copicat models over more than 50 years.

== Models ==
- Watkins Copicat Mk1
- Watkins Copicat Mk2 (1961) (turquoise) or (1964) (black & cream) - rotary head replaced by push buttons
- WEM Custom Copicat (1966) - repeat, multi-repeat, reverberation-like multi-tap echo, 2 inputs, 2 gain controls. Also marketed as the "Kent Eko" by Hagström
- The Shadow Echo
- WEM Copicat MkIII (1970s) - Solid State
- WEM Copicat MkIV - highest volume model produced, also produced as a Guild-branded version to answer US demand
- WEM Copicat IC300 (late 70s)
- WEM Copicat IC300 Super (late 70s) - simplified electronics, lighter
- WEM Halle Cat (1975) - Copicat combined with 4-channel mixer
- WEM Copicat Varispeed
- WEM Copicat Varispeed IC400
- WEM Copicat IC500
- WEM Copicat Super Shadow Type 1 (1990s) - valve/tube with Varispeed
- WEM Copicat Super Shadow Type 2 (1990s)
- Watkins Copicat Gold (2009) - a programmable unit that emulates the characteristics of various Copicat models, as well as classic Binson, Meazzi, and Roland Space Echo units.

== Software emulations ==
Wavesfactory makes an analogue-modelling delay plug-in emulation of the Copicat called the Echo Cat.
