= Watkins Electric Music =

British musical instrument and PA manufacturer

- DayGlo orange WEM logo as used on the company's amplification since 1967
- Type: public
- Industry: musical instruments
- Founded: London, England 1949
- Founder: Charlie Watkins
- Headquarters: London, United Kingdom
- Products: guitar, bass and PA amplification
- Website: wemwatkins.co.uk

Watkins Electric Music (WEM) is a British company known for manufacturing PA systems, the Copicat tape echo unit, guitar amplifiers, and electric guitars.

== History ==
The company was co-founded by musician Charlie Watkins and his brother Reg Watkins in 1949, initially as a record shop in Tooting Market, London. Two years later the brothers moved to a small shop in Balham and began selling accordions and guitars.

Watkins Electric Music was one of the first to manufacture and sell guitar amplifiers in England, introducing the Watkins Westminster in 1954, followed up by the V-fronted Dominator.

In 1958, Watkins Electric Music introduced the Copicat, one of the first-ever portable tape echo units. The shop sold the entire first production run of 100 Copicats on the first day, including the very first Copicat sold to Johnny Kidd of Johnny Kidd & the Pirates, whose guitarist used it on the group's UK hit song "Shakin' All Over". The Copicat would become one of the company's most successful products, with various different Copicat models released over more than 50 years. By the end of the 1950s, selling amps, echo units, and a line of solid-body electric guitars designed by Reg, Watkins Electric Music was one of the top 3 companies of the U.K. music trade.

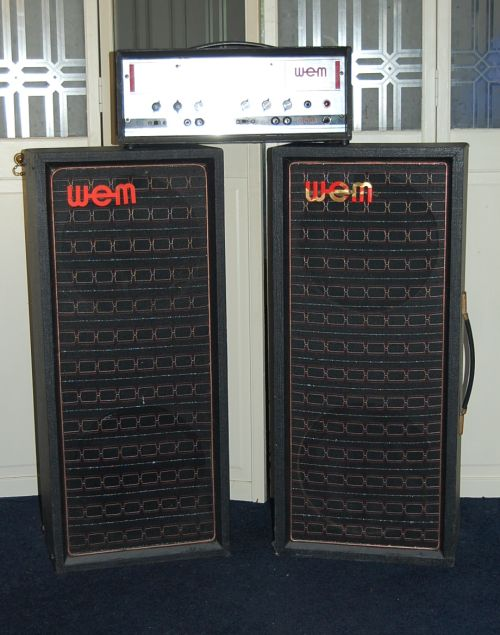
A WEM 100 watt PA dating from 1969

In 1967-1968 The Who used the WEM (Watkins Electric Music) Audiomaster five-channel mixer and multiple WEM 100-watt transistor PA amplifiers chained together as their sound system. In the concert movie Pink Floyd: Live at Pompeii (1972), the band is shown using WEM PA equipment as it performs in the ruins of an ancient amphitheatre in Pompeii, Italy. Jimi Hendrix and his Band of Gypsys also used WEM PA equipment at outdoor venues in the UK. WEM amplification can also be seen in footage of the Miles Davis Electric Band playing at the Isle of Wight festival in 1970, in Led Zeppelin's 1969 supershow in London, and in The Stones in the Park, one of the Hyde Park Free Concerts. The amps were also used by Jack Bruce of Cream. In a 2023 interview on That Pedal Show on YouTube, Noel Gallagher discusses his use of WEM amplifiers in conjunction with other amplifiers to produce his signature sounds, especially those used in the early years that made Oasis famous.

A scaled down version of the company still operates, focusing on accordions and a new handmade version of the Copicat tape echo units.
