= María Xosé Queizán =

Spanish feminist (born 1939)

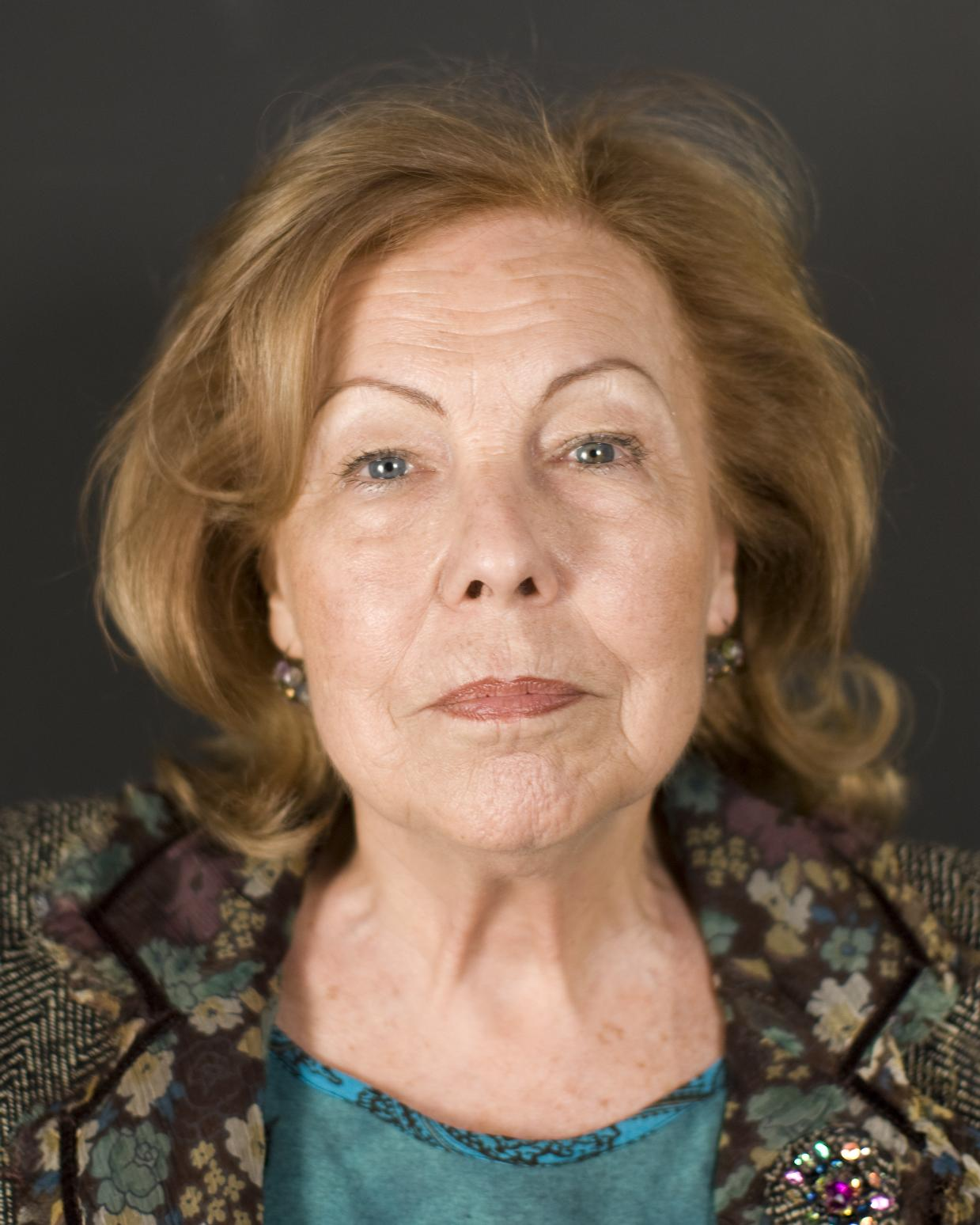
Queizán in 2007

María Xosé Queizán (born 1939) is a Spanish writer and feminist.

Queizán become a prominent public figure of the Spanish feminist movement in the 1950s. She founded the Art and Essay Theatre Group of Vigo's Press association in 1959. She founded the Popular Galician Theatre in 1967. She was an early writer in Galician feminist literary criticism, subverting traditional masculine interpretations of literature in her 1980 essay Recuperemos as mans (transl. Let Us Recover Our Hands).

Queizán has written plays, essays, and fictional narratives about feminism. Queizán's interpretation of feminism is influenced by nationalist feminism, Marxist feminism, and the ideas of Simone de Beauvoir. She is critical of Galician nationalism for what she described as its inordinate focus on men at the expense of women's history in the region. Queizán has written about the subject of motherhood, proposing that the social role of motherhood is distinct from the biological aspects of child-rearing. She argues that men have greater access to the social aspects of parenthood while women are restricted by the biological aspects.
