= Movida viguesa =

Spanish cultural movement

The Movida viguesa (or Movida gallega) was an important youth cultural movement that took place in Vigo, Spain during the 1980s, preceding and coinciding with the Movida Madrileña (the "Golden Age for Spanish Pop"). By the late seventies, the industrial port city of Vigo suffered high levels of youth unemployment and a massive, industrial reform of the naval sector. Born out of this context, the Movida viguesa was primarily a musical and aesthetic movement: a counterculture centered around nightlife and bars in the historic city center. It challenged the traditional values of the period amidst the general atmosphere of economic crisis as well as political skepticism (resulting from an overall sense of disenchantment during the political transition from Franco's fascist dictatorship to a democracy).

== Origins ==
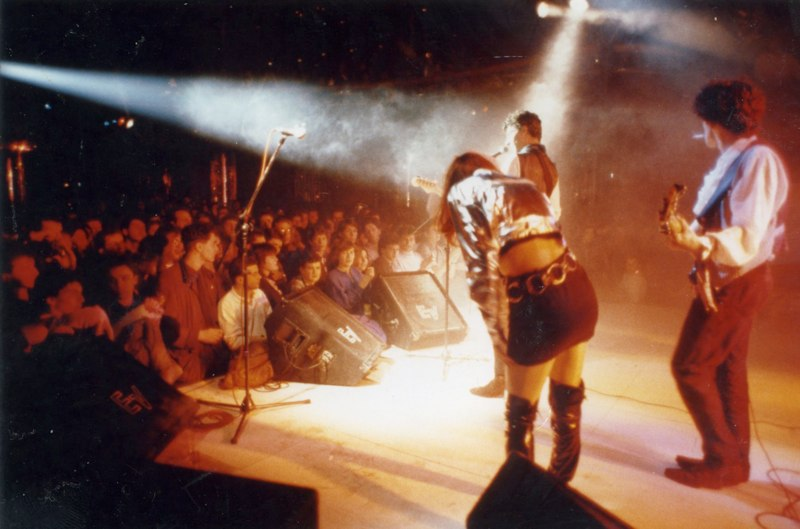
Aerolíneas Federales in concert in 1985

The movida viguesa was born out of local pubs and bars like Angara and Satchmo. The city boomed with new bands, leading to the rise of music groups like Bar, TrenVigo and Mari Cruz Soriano y los que afinan su piano (later known as Siniestro Total). Heavily influenced by postmodernism, each had with their own distinct style (punk, pop, techno, reggae, ska, funk) with chaotic, comical and irreverent lyrics that reflect the concentrated plurality of voices and opinions.

The movida then spread to other iconic pubs, many of which are still open, such as El Kremlin, El Manco de Lepanto and El Ruralex (now called Vademécum).

Among the more notable bands of this period were Golpes Bajos (a grouped organized by Germán Coppini), Aerolíneas Federales, Os Resentidos (led by Antón Reixa), Semen Up and Ultramarinos Troncoso (the only techno band in Vigo during this period). They enjoyed incredible success, but only Siniestro Total is still active today, achieving international success.

Video art was a particularly significant medium of the time. Director Xavier Villaverde produced one of the most recognizable music videos of the Movida viguesa: “Galicia Caníbal” by Os Resentidos. This song would later become an anthem of the Movida viguesa, achieving national recognition throughout Spain.

During a weekend trip to Galicia in September, 1986, Cabinete Caligari, Los Nikis, Alaska and los Pegamoides effectively married the movida madrileña and the movida viguesa. A planned reunion in Madrid (spring, 1987) failed to take place.

== See also ==
- Bravú
