= Queremos Galego =

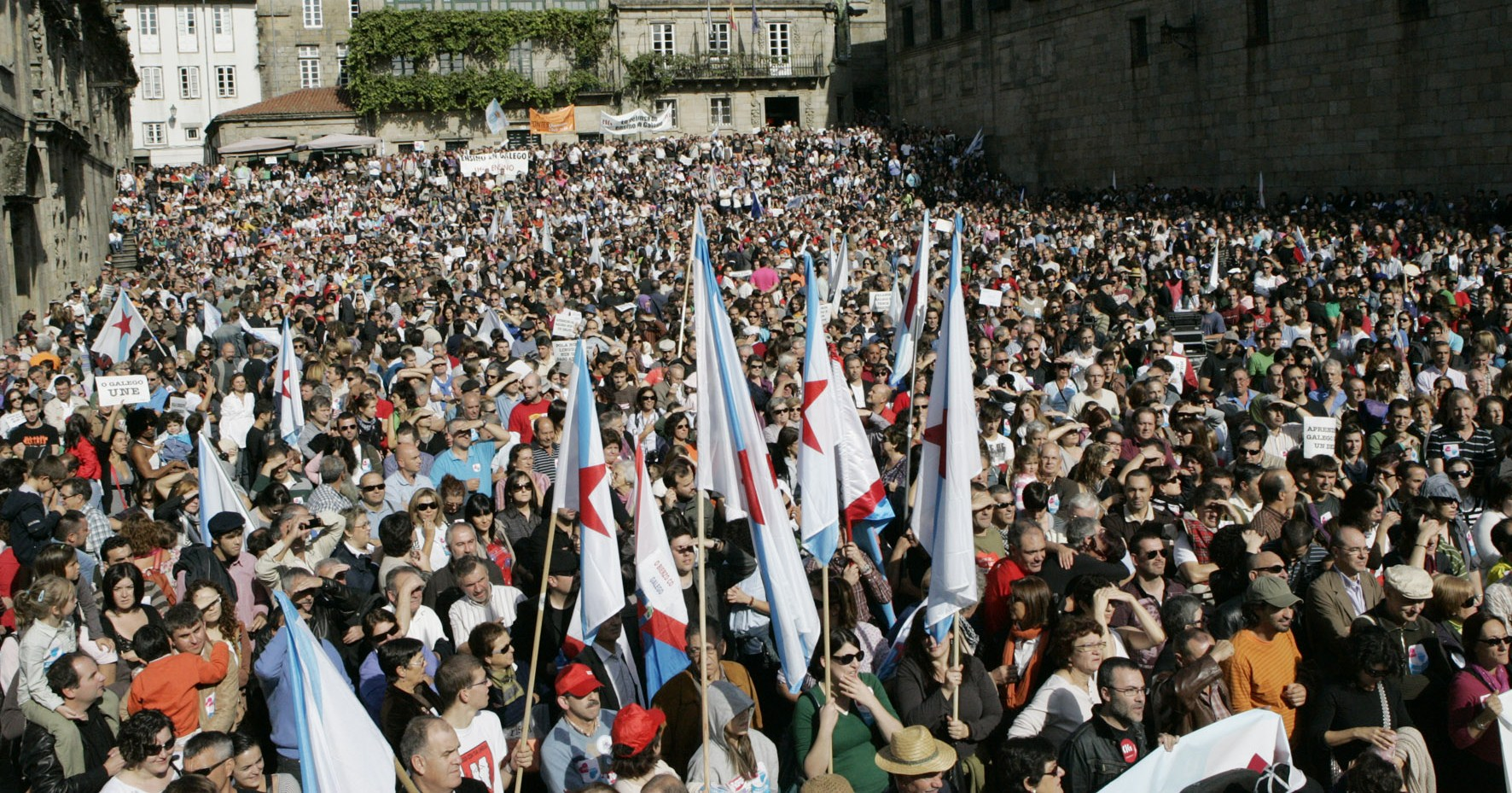
Demonstration de Queremos Galego! in Santiago de Compostela.

Queremos Galego or Plataforma Queremos Galego! (English: We want Galician!) is a citizen platform and social movement, consisting of 600 entities from different areas and by people individually, that was born in 2009 to articulate a collective response in defense of the Galician language, its public use, and the linguistic rights of the Galician-speaking population. The main actions of the platform are demonstrations and public acts. The current main goal of Queremos Galego is to fight against the linguistic policy of the People's Party of Galicia.

== History ==
The platform called for two demonstrations in 2009. The first one on May 17 and the second on October 18, with the assistance of 50,000 people.

On January 21, 2010, called a general strike in the Galician education system and for a demonstration in Santiago de Compostela, which was seconded by most unions, opposition political parties, teachers, students, parents, and various groups. The demonstration was attended by 50,000 people according to the police and by 100,000 according to Queremos Galego. According to the Xunta de Galicia 50% of teachers and students went on strike the same day, according to Quermos Galego it was the 90%. The coverage of the strike by the Galician public TV station was widely criticized.

Queremos Galego called for demonstrations again on the Galician Literature Day of 2012 and 2013. Both demonstrations had the assistance o around 25,000 people. On the Galician Literature Day of 2014 Queremos Galego called for 8 demonstrations in the main cities of Galicia against the linguistic policy of the People's Party of Galicia.

== See also ==
- Galician language
- Diglossia
