= Os Resentidos =

Galician rock band

- Origin: Vigo, Galicia, Spain
- Genres: Post-punk; Hip-hop; Electronic; Galician music
- Years active: 1983-1994, 2012-present
- Labels: Grabaciones Accidentales; Altafonte
- Spinoffs: Siniestro Total; Nación Reixa; Los Buzos; Os Cantores Do Sil; Semen Up
- Members: Antón Reixa; Javier Soto; Andrés Cunha; Anxo Graña
- Past members: Alberto Torrado; Rubén Losada; Xavier Debesa

Os Resentidos (The Resentfuls) was a Galician rock band from Vigo, Spain founded in 1982 by Antón Reixa, Alberto Torrado, Rubén Losada, and Javier Soto. In 1985, Javier later left the band, being replaced by Xabier Debesa. The leader of the band, Antón Reixa, was the vocalist and lyricist while the other band members were instrumentalists. Os Resentidos disbanded in 1994 but got back together again in 2012 on their 30th anniversary.

== History ==
The group almost exclusively sang in Galician—except for their hit "Rockin' Chair", in English. Their influences ranged from funk, Caribbean, African, and classic rock music to traditional Galician folk songs and period Hip hop, of which they were considered pioneers in Spain. The singing technique of Reixa, a well-known Galician poet and filmmaker, was similar to that of Old school hip hop, perhaps because he never was taught to sing. The instrumentation ranged from traditional Galician bagpipes (gaitas) to synthesizers, saxophones, keyboard, electric guitars, and bass.

According to José Colmeiro, their works present a postmodern, heterogeneous mix of “tradition and modernity”, “integrating the rural and the urban”. They were among the first bands to popularize the use of Galician in a rock song. Their most recognizable hit was "Fai un Sol de Carallo" (1986), a folk-inflected politic-danceable rock song that would become an anthem for the Movida viguesa. Due to its success, it was also translated into English and Basque. Other famous songs included "Galicia Sitio Distinto" and "Galicia Express", criticizing the state of Galicia with comical and irreverent lyrics. Their 1990 album Jei (the title song parodying the Julio Iglesias's singing style) was critically acclaimed and was declared the best national album of the year by Rockdelux magazine.

== Members ==
=== Original members ===
- Antón Reixa: Vocals (1983-1994, 2012-present)
- Alberto Torrado: Electric guitar (1983-1994, 2012)
- Xabier Soto: Electric bass (1983-1987, 2012-present)
- Rubén Losada: Saxophone, synthesizers, drum machines (1983-1987, 2012-2016)

== Discography ==
- Vigo, Capital Lisboa (Grabaciones Accidentales [GASA], 1984)
- Fai un Sol de Carallo (Gasa, 1986)
- Música Doméstica (Gasa, 1987)
- Fracaso Tropical (Gasa, 1988)
- Jei (Gasa, 1990)
- Delikatessen (Gasa, 1992)
- Xa Están Aquí (Gasa, 1993)
- Made in Galicia 1984-1994 (Gasa, 1994) (Greatest Hits Collection)

== See also ==
- Bravú
