= Siniestro Total =

Galician punk rock group

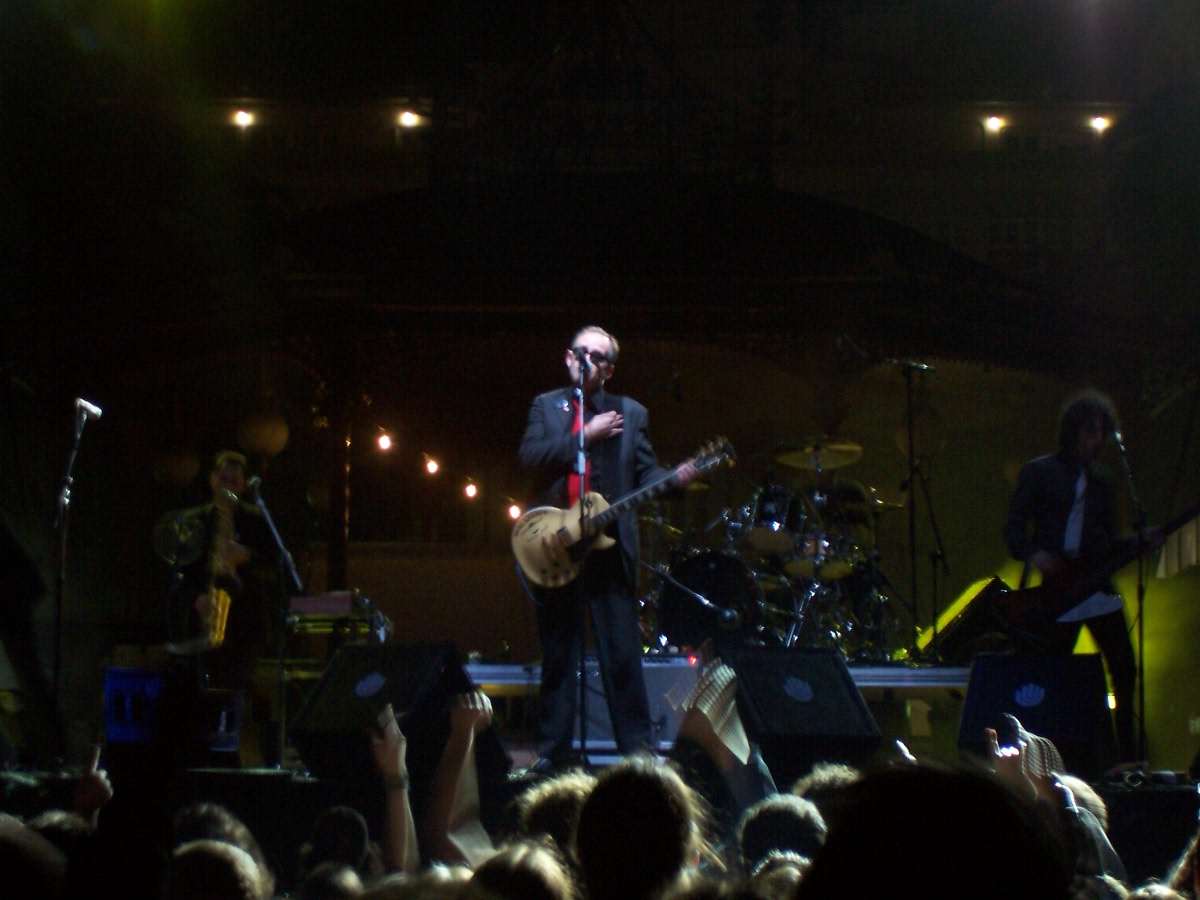
- Siniestro Total performing in 2007

Background information
- Also known as: Mari Cruz Soriano y los Que Afinan su Piano
- Origin: Vigo, Galicia, Spain
- Genres: Rock; punk rock; punk blues
- Years active: 1981–present
- Labels: Dro; BMG; Virgin; El Diablo
- Spinoffs: Os Resentidos; Aerolíneas Federales; Golpes Bajos; Los Buzos; Transportes Hernández y Sanjurjo; Os Cantores Do Sil; Def Con Dos
- Members: Julían Hernández; Javier Soto; Ángel González; Jorge Beltrán; Óscar G. Avendaño
- Past members: Miguel Costas; Alberto Torrado; Germán Coppini; Segundo Grandío
- Website: siniestro.com

Siniestro Total (meaning literally 'total write-off' as in the insurance term for a vehicle that is beyond repair following a motor accident) is a Galician punk rock group from Vigo, Spain. It was founded in 1981 during the cultural movement called Movida viguesa by Julián Hernández, Alberto Torrado and Miguel Costas. After many changes in personnel, current members are Julián Hernández, Javier Soto, Óscar G. Avendaño, Ángel González and Jorge Beltrán.

== Style ==
Their first album, ¿Cuándo se come aquí? (When do we eat here?), features very short songs, with a marked punk style. In the second one, Siniestro Total II: El Regreso (Siniestro Total II: The Return), songs are essentially punk, but more instruments come to play. In the third one, Menos mal que nos queda Portugal (At least we still have Portugal), the punk evolves to a more classical rock, although lyrics are still punk. In the fourth one, Bailaré sobre tu tumba (I'll dance over your grave) the rock style continues. The fifth and sixth ones, De hoy no pasa (Today is the last time) and Me gusta cómo andas (I like the way you walk), the rock is still softer, becoming power-pop, whereas the lyrics continue being punk in essence.

The seventh, En beneficio de todos (For the benefit of all), they get back to rock, and lyrics evolve and become more complex. The eighth and ninth ones, Made in Japan and Policlínico miserable (Miserable clinic), feature a harder rock (even heavy metal, and lyrics are darker and more critical. In their tenth album, Sesión vermú (Vermouth session), the rock is softer. They make an unexpected turn in their eleventh album, La historia del blues (The history of blues), and they play blues, with lyrics based on someone else's work (Jack Griffin). With the twelfth one, Popular, democrático y científico (Popular, democratic and scientific), they return to rock, with a style close to grunge.

== Members ==
Current members

- Julián Hernández — guitar, vocals, drums, synthesisers (1981–present)
- Javier Soto — guitar, backing vocals (1985–present)
- Jorge Beltrán — saxophone, backing vocals (1996–present)
- Óscar G. Avendaño — bass, backing vocals (2001–present)
- Andrés Cunha — drums (2018–present)

Former members

- Germán Coppini — vocals (1981-1983; died 2013)
- Alberto Torrado — guitar, bass, backing vocals (1981-1987)
- Miguel Costas — guitar, vocals (1981-1994)
- Segundo Grandío — bass, backing vocals (1988-2001)
- Ángel González — drums (1988–2018)

== Discography ==
=== Studio albums ===
- es:¿Cuándo se come aquí? (1982)
- es:Siniestro Total II: el regreso (1983)
- Menos mal que nos queda Portugal (1984)
- Bailaré sobre tu tumba (1985)
- es:De hoy no pasa (1987)
- Me gusta cómo andas (1988)
- En beneficio de todos (1990)
- es:Made in Japan (1993)
- es:Policlínico miserable (1995)
- Sesión vermú (1997)
- La historia del blues (2000)
- Popular, democrático y científico (2005)
- es:Country & Western (2010)
- El mundo da vueltas (2016)
- Que no cunda el orden (2024 - recorded in 1982)

=== Live albums ===
- Bailaré sobre tu tumba (1985 - only B side)
- Ante todo mucha calma (1992)
- Cultura popular (1997)
- Así empiezan las peleas (1997)
- Que parezca un accidente (2008)
- La Noche de La Iguana (2014)
- Acto fundacional (2025 - recorded in 1981)

=== Compilation albums ===
- Gran D Sexitos (1986)
- Héroes de los ochenta (1990)
- Trabajar para el enemigo (1992)
- Ojalá estuvieras aquí (1993)
- Gato por liebre (1997)
- ¿Quiénes somos? ¿De dónde venimos? ¿A dónde vamos? (2002)
- La edad de oro del pop español (2001)

=== Collaborations ===
- Navidades radioactivas (1982)
- El día de la bestia BSO (1996)
- Agradecidos... Rosendo (1997)
- L'asturianu muévese (1997)
