= Come prima =

Italian song performed by Tony Dallara

"Come prima" (English: "As Before") is an Italian song, with lyrics by Mario Panzeri and music by Vincenzo Di Paola and Sandro Taccani. First made popular by Tony Dallara in Italy in 1957, a version by the Marino Marini Quartet was a hit in the United Kingdom in 1958.

== Versions ==
The first and most popular version of "Come prima" in Italy was released by Tony Dallara (Antonio Lardera) in 1957. "Come prima" was Tony Dallara's first and breakthrough single. Although it was rejected for admission to the Sanremo Festival, it was an instant success and sold 300,000 copies, becoming the biggest selling single in Italy up to that point.

In 1958 Tony Renis and the Combos also recorded the 45 rpm piece (Combo Record, 5057), also published in Germany, as a soloist (Polydor, 23 815).

Also in 1958, Italian French singer Dalida recorded a bilingual version of ‘Come prima’ as part of her signature album Le disque d'or de Dalida. Come prima (Tu me donnes), as it became known in France and Belgium, was one of Dalida’s first major hit songs.

In 1958, a version of the song recorded by the Marino Marini Quartet made the United Kingdom charts. That same year, the song was also recorded by Domenico Modugno, Nicola Arigliano and Armando Trovajoli's orchestra with singer Miranda Martino. The following year, the song was a hit for Dalida under the same song title, but with lyrics sung in French. Besides being translated in English, "Come prima" ended up being translated to Croatian and was released as "Kao prije" in 1958 as a solo record by Ivo Robić.

The song's music also served as the basis of an English language song, "More Than Ever", with lyrics by Mary Bond, recorded in the United Kingdom by Malcolm Vaughan with the Michael Sammes Singers (His Master's Voice catalogue number POP 538) (14 weeks on the UK chart, peaking at #5), Robert Earl (4 weeks on the UK chart, peaking at #26), Eve Boswell, and others. Another English language lyric version of the song under the title "For the First Time", by Buck Ram, was recorded in the United States by Polly Bergen in 1958 (Columbia Records catalog number 41275). This version was also performed by Mario Lanza in his last film, For the First Time (1959).

Other performers who recorded versions of the song were The Platters (1958), Willy Alberti (1958), Dean Martin, Muslim Magomayev (1961), Tony Reno & the Sherwoods (1965), and Golpes Bajos (1985). Cliff Richard sang it in Italian on his album When In Rome (1965).

In 1991, Hong Kong actress Gloria Yip recorded a cover version of the song in Japanese.

In 2012, Belgian singer Frank Galan recorded a Dutch version of the song, entitled Valentina, which he included on his album Mooier dan woorden.

Brazilian superstar Caetano Veloso sang "Come prima" on his recorded concert Omaggio a Federico e Giulietta (a tribute to Fellini and Giulietta Masina) in 1997, performed it live at the Italian Sanremo Festival in 2013, and included the song in his world tour with Gilberto Gil in 2015 (live album in 2016).

In 2017, Dallara's recording was used in both a UK Coca-Cola commercial and a Fiat 500 commercial.
