= Festival Internacional de Benicàssim =

Music festival in Benicàssim, Spain

Coordinates: 40.0472°N 0.069444°E

Festival Internacional de Benicàssim (FIB)
- Genre: Pop, dance, indie rock, indie pop, electro
- Dates: 2nd week of July
- Locations: Benicàssim, province of Castelló, Valencian Community in Spain
- Years active: 1995–present
- Website: http://fiberfib.com

The Festival Internacional de Benicàssim (Valencian pronunciation: [festiˈval inteɾnasi.oˈnal de beniˈkasim]), commonly abbreviated as FIB, is an annual music festival that takes place in the town of Benicàssim, in the Valencian Community, Spain. It focuses mainly on pop, rock, and electronica artists, as well as short films, fashion shows and art.

The festival begins on the second Tuesday of July, which is when the camping grounds open – although music officially commences Thursday afternoon. FIB is notable for having bands play through the night (5 pm–8 am) and has three main stages, Las Palmas, Visa, and South Beach Dance, with capacities of approximately 30,000, 15,000 and 8,000, respectively. In 2009, the festival capacity exceeded 50,000; in 2020, more than 150,000 visited the festival over the four days the festival lasted.

== History ==
The first FIB took place in 1995. Since then, Benicàssim has been dedicated to rock, pop, and electronic music as well as featuring artists who are a reference on the world stage.

== Location ==
FIB is held in the seaside resort of Benicassim (Castellón province) on Costa del Azahar, Valencia, Spain, 92.2 km away from Valencia Airport. Festival goers who have purchased multi-day passes can camp for up to nine days starting the Monday before and ending Tuesday after the festival has ended.

== Previous bands ==
Since the first festival in 1995, some of the most notable artists who have played the festival include The Arctic Monkeys, Beck, Blur, The Chemical Brothers, Depeche Mode, Franz Ferdinand, The Killers, Kraftwerk, Ladytron, Morrissey, Oasis, Placebo, Primal Scream, Radiohead, Lou Reed, Ride, Sigur Rós, The Stone Roses, The Strokes, Teenage Fanclub, Paul Weller and Brian Wilson.

== 2005 Festival ==
The eleventh festival took place on August 5–7, 2005, with The Cure, Keane and Oasis headlining. Underworld were later announced as headliners of the "FIBstart" event on Thursday July 4, supported by The Tears and The Polyphonic Spree. Fischerspooner, !!! and Róisín Murphy headlined the weekend on the Hellomoto Stage, while The Kills, Kaiser Chiefs and The Wedding Present headlined the Fiberfib.com Stage. Other bands playing the festival included Basement Jaxx, The Lemonheads, Hot Hot Heat, Kasabian, Nick Cave and the Bad Seeds, Yo La Tengo, Dinosaur Jr., LCD Soundsystem, Ladytron, Doves, Egoexpress, Radio 4 and Richard Hawley.

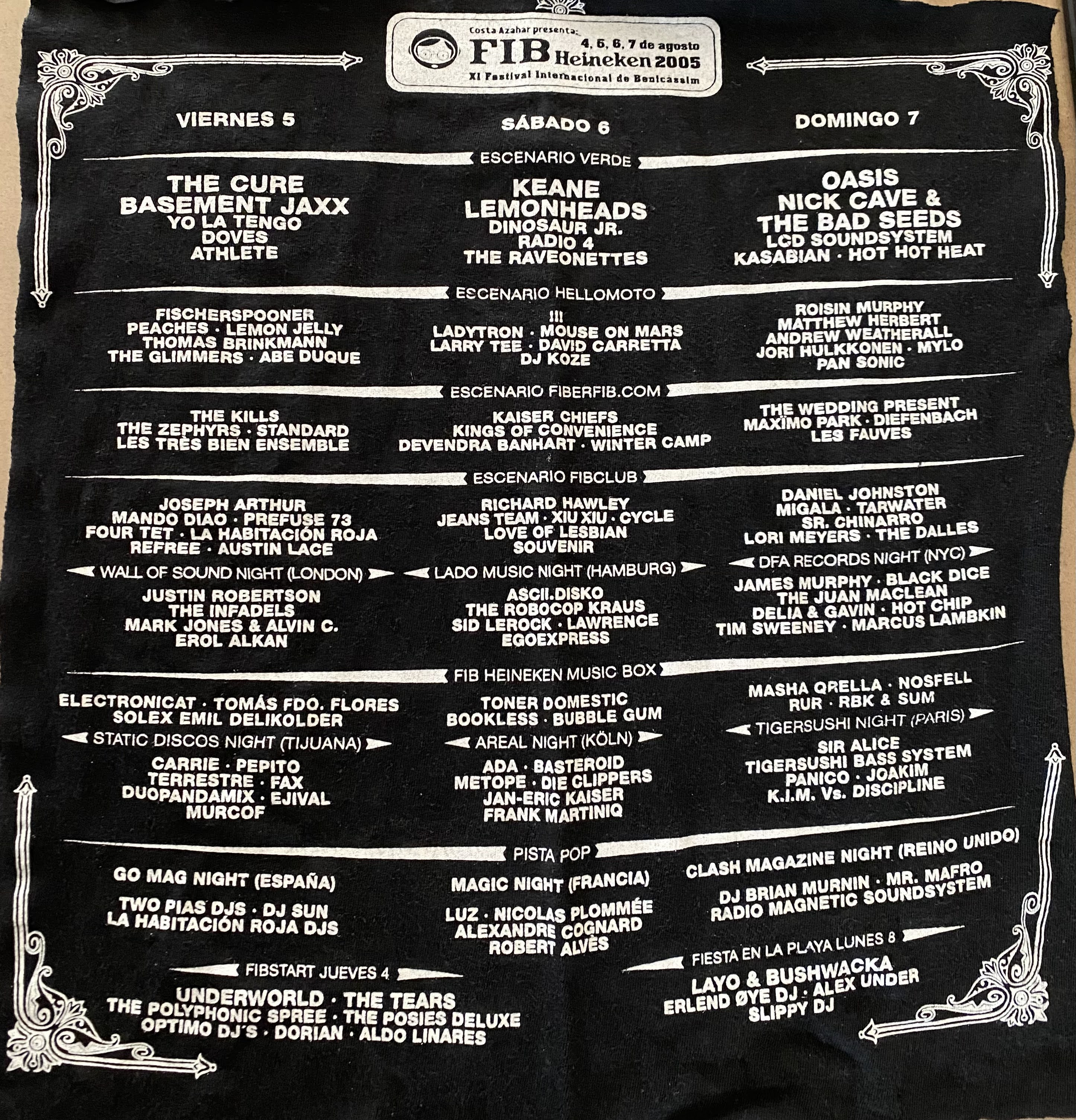

== 2006 Festival ==
The 12th Benicàssim Festival occurred between 20–23 July 2006. Performers included Franz Ferdinand, The Pixies, Depeche Mode, Placebo, Echo & the Bunnymen, Madness, Morrissey, The Strokes, Scissor Sisters, Babyshambles, Beth Orton, Editors, The Futureheads, We Are Scientists, The Kooks and Art Brut, among others.

== 2007 Festival ==
The 13th edition of the festival was held on the 19–22 July 2007. For this year's festival (and all subsequent festivals thereafter), there was no Hellomoto Stage, with the Pista Pop stage expanded instead. The line-up was as follows:

=== Escenario Verde (Main Stage) ===
| Thursday | Friday | Saturday | Sunday |
| Iggy & the Stooges; Bright Eyes; Mando Diao; Los Planetas; Brazilian Girls; JoJo De Freq; Jonston; Aldo Linares | Devo; Dinosaur Jr.; Wilco; Fangoria; Klaxons | Arctic Monkeys; The B-52's; Fischerspooner; The Magic Numbers; Albert Hammond Jr. | Muse; Black Rebel Motorcycle Club; Kings of Leon; Unkle; The Hives |

=== Fiberfib.com Stage ===
==== Afternoon Session ====
| Friday | Saturday | Sunday |
| Antony and the Johnsons; Rufus Wainwright; Nouvelle Vague; Olimpic | Os Mutantes; Astrud; The Clientele; Chris Aliano | Calexico; Animal Collective; The Pipettes; The Electric City |

==== Night Session ====
| Friday | Saturday | Sunday |
| Carl Craig; The Rapture; GusGus; Vitalic; WhoMadeWho; Oliver Huntemann | The Human League; !!!; Ellen Allien; Cansei de Ser Sexy; DJ Hoze; Damien Lazarus | Armand Van Helden; Amy Winehouse; Matthew Dear; DJ Yoda; Simian Mobile Disco |

=== Vodafone FIB Club Stage ===
| Friday | Saturday | Sunday |
| The Horrors; Kiko Veneno; OK Go; Herman Düne; Mirafiori; The Unfinished Sympathy; The Presets; DX7; Digitalism; Delon & Dalcan; Dan Le Sac Vs Scroobius Pip | Camera Obscura; Sondre Lerche and the Faces Down; Peter Bjorn and John; Najwajean; Jamie T; Dorian; Sascha Funke; Cielo; Lo-Fi-Fnk; Cosmo (Bitches Brew) | Clap Your Hands Say Yeah; The Go! Team; Patrick Wolf; Peter von Poehl; Catpeople; Remate & Loco Band; Cassius; Datarock; Tobias Thomas; Marc Romboy |

=== Vueling Pista Pop Stage ===
| Thursday | Friday | Saturday | Sunday |
| People Are Germs; Trash Pussies; Vacaciones Diyeis; Johann Wald; Artista Por Confirmar DJ | Jesús Ordovás; Jose Maria Rey; DJ Lui (The Melting Pot); Bluetonic; Maadraasso | Juan Demenzial; Dorian DJ; DJ Rojiblanco; Hascaso | Paco H; Potapop; Scream; Filthy Dukes |

== 2008 Festival ==
The 14th Edition of the festival was held on 17, 18, 19 and 20 July 2008.

=== Escenario Verde (Main Stage) ===
| Thursday | Friday | Saturday | Sunday |
| Sigur Rós; Nada Surf; Black Lips; Mates of State; These New Puritans; Krakovia; DJ Supermarkt; Aldo Linares | My Bloody Valentine; Mika; Róisín Murphy; New York Dolls; Babyshambles | Gnarls Barkley; The Raconteurs; The Kills; My Morning Jacket; The Brian Jonestown Massacre | Leonard Cohen; Morrissey; Siouxsie; Morente Omega con Lagartija Nick; Vive la Fête |

=== Fiberfib.com Stage ===
| Friday | Saturday | Sunday |
| Hot Chip; South San Gabriel; Erol Alkan; Josh Wink; The Glimmers; The Rumble Strips; Vincent Vincent and the Villains; El Guincho; Danton Eeprom | Tricky; American Music Club; John Acquaviva; Booka Shade; Heavy Trash; Ivan Smagghe; The Ting Tings; Kiki; The Marzipan Man | Justice; Death Cab for Cutie; The National; Tommie Sunshine; Supermayer; Radio Slave; Ewan Pearson; Calvin Harris; El Hijo |

=== Vodafone FIB Club Stage ===
| Thursday | Friday | Saturday | Sunday |
| Battles; Lightspeed Champion; Facto delafé y las flores azules; Single | Spiritualized; La Casa Azul; Fujiya & Miyagi; El Columpio Asesino; Metronomy; Gentle Music Men; Chromatics; Robert Babicz; Tobi Neumann | José González; Eef Barzelay; Bracken; Lori Meyers; Dapuntobeat; Manos De Topo; Tiefschwarz; Ascii.Disco; Metope | Richard Hawley; Micah P. Hinson; Yelle; The Courteeners; Moriarty; Joakim; David Duriez; Marc Marzenit; Jklmno |

=== Samsung Pista Pop Stage ===
| Thursday | Friday | Saturday | Sunday |
| Two Pias DJs; El Bueno, El Feo & El Malo; DJ Mamarracha; Pin & Pon DJs; Frankie & Annette | Tomás Fernando Flores; Derwinzige; Toxicosmos DJ; I Was There | Juan De Pablos; Calcetines & Johann Wald; Blanca db; Lineas Albiés DJs | Kinki; On Air; José María Rey |

== 2008 Festival: Saturday Night Fiber ==
Saturday Night Fiber, a spin-off festival created in 2008, took place on the Saturday night of Benicàssim in Madrid.

== 2009 Festival ==
On 23 December 2008, two of the four headliners for the 2009 festival were announced as Kings of Leon and Franz Ferdinand. Kings of Leon had previously played the festival in 2007, while Franz Ferdinand headlined in 2006. Tickets were made available at a discounted launch price between 15 December 2008 and 15 January 2009, with a four-day weekend pass available for €160 (£140). This includes full festival entry between 16–19 July, as well as camping between 13–21 July. On 27 January 2009, it was reported that Oasis would also be joining the line-up. On 2 February 2009, NME confirmed that The Killers would be headlining the final night of the festival, with Franz Ferdinand playing Saturday 18 July and Kings of Leon playing Friday 17 July. The article also stated that Oasis would headlining the "FIBstart" event on 16 July 2009. BBC News Online confirmed that Paul Weller would be playing on Friday 17 July. On 26 February 2009, it was announced that The Psychedelic Furs, Friendly Fires, White Lies, The Bishops and Boys Noize had been added to the line-up, with Benicàssim's official website confirming which days the bands would be playing. Further line-up additions were made on 17 March 2009, and again on 2 April 2009. The line-up was as follows:

| Thursday | Friday | Saturday | Sunday |
| Oasis; Aldo Linares; Anni B Sweet; The Bishops; The Coronas; Glasvegas; Mystery Jets; Naive New Beaters; No Reply; The Walkmen; We Are Standard | Boys Noize; Fight Like Apes; The Horrors; Joe Crepusculo; Magazine; Maxïmo Park; Nacho Vegas; Nudozurdo; Paul Weller; Yuksek; Polly Mackey & The Pleasure Principle | Franz Ferdinand; Aeroplane; Bell X1; Elbow; Gui Boratto; Foals; 2 Many DJ's; Jose Santiago; Lily Allen; The Mighty Stef; Peaches; Ratolines; Steve Aoki; Tadeo | The Killers; Catpeople; Friendly Fires; Klaus & Kinski; Late of the Pier; Laurent Garnier; Lykke Li; The Psychedelic Furs; TV on the Radio; White Lies |

=== 2009 festival disruption ===
On the night of Friday 17 July a large fire broke out in scrubland within a few hundred metres of the festival site. High winds contributed to the difficulty of fighting the fire and caused conditions on many of the stages to become unsafe. As a result, a number of acts including the Kings of Leon, Maxïmo Park, Boys Noize and Yuksek were unable to perform. Tom Tom Club did perform but had to be taken off for their own safety. Maxïmo Park performed the following night following a cancellation by Lily Allen.

Several hundred festival goers had to be evacuated from the campsite to a nearby sports hall. The festival resumed the following day with limited disruption. Glamour model Bianca Gascoigne and Ringtone artist Ross Kent were reported in tabloid newspapers as having "gone missing" but reappeared several days later.

== 2010 Festival ==
=== Escenario Verde (Main Stage) ===
| Thursday | Friday | Saturday | Sunday |
| Kasabian; Ray Davies; Charlotte Gainsbourg; Broken Bells; Southern Arts Society; The Paris Riots | Vampire Weekend; Hot Chip; DJ Shadow; Julian Casablancas; Fionn Regan; Triángulo De Amor Bizarro | The Prodigy; The Specials; Ian Brown; Klaxons; Ash; Gentle Music Men | Gorillaz; Dizzee Rascal; Lily Allen; Leftfield; The Courteeners; Standstill |

=== Fiberfib.com Stage ===
| Thursday | Friday | Saturday | Sunday |
| The Temper Trap; Love Of Lesbian; Magnetic Man; El Hijo; Skream; Benga; Cohete; Puggy | Goldfrapp; Calvin Harris; Mumford & Sons; Boys Noize; Timo Maas; Sr. Chinarro; Alondra Bentley; Delorentos | PiL; The Sunday Drivers; Cut Copy; Bigott; Alex Under; The Japanese Popstars; Chuchillo; The Ruskins | Echo & The Bunnymen; Foals; Midnight Juggernauts; Efterklang; Two Door Cinema Club; Prins Thomas; Funkagenda; I Blame Coco |

=== Eastpak FIB Club Stage ===
| Thursday | Friday | Saturday | Sunday |
| Brendan Benson; Scratch Perverts; Dirty Projectors; Joris Voorn; Phil Kieran; Jack L; Chin Yi | Peter Hook (performing Unknown Pleasures); Ilegales; The Haçienda Night (featuring Graeme Park, DJ Pierre & Justin Robertson); Yacht & The Straight Gaze; jj; Cola Jet Set | The Cribs; Four Tet (live); The Clientele; Deadelus; Motor; Jonston; Aaron Wright & The Aprils; Ryan Sheridan | Lindstrøm & Christabelle; Yuksek; Ellie Goulding; The Pinker Tones; Jack Beats; Parade; Marcus Doo & The Secret Family; Kidd Ross |

Due to illness, Lily Allen's Sunday set was canceled and Ellie Goulding was moved up to replace her. Roy Pridmore was a late addition to the bill.

== 2011 Festival ==
Maravillas Stage

| Thursday | Friday | Saturday | Sunday |
| The Streets; Plan B; Pendulum; Paolo Nutini; Russian Red; Layabouts | The Strokes; Brandon Flowers; Elbow; Friendly Fires; Nudozurdo; Atom Rhumba | Arctic Monkeys; Mumford and Sons; Primal Scream; Lori Meyers; Tame Impala; Mcenroe | Arcade Fire; Portishead; Noah and the Whale; Catpeople; Pigbag; The Coronas |

Fiberfib.com Stage

| Thursday | Friday | Saturday | Sunday |
| Lesser Gods; Henry Saiz; Jack Beats; Chase and Status; Congotronics vs. Rockers; Julieta Venegas; Antilles; The Spires | Mary Anne Hobbs; The Juan MacLean; James Murphy; The Stranglers; Herman Dune; The Paris Riots; Ainara LeGardon; Jane Joyd | Derrick Carter; Fake Blood; Big Audio Dynamite; Beirut; Bombay Bicycle Club; Astrud and Col-lectiu Brossa; Nadadora; Jerry Fish and the Mudbug Club | Gesaffelstein; Roska; Tinie Tempah; The Go! Team; Professor Green; The Joy Formidable; Antonia Font; Los Eterno |

Fib Club

| Thursday | Friday | Saturday | Sunday |
| Crystal Fighters; Dorian; Anna Calvi; Guille Milkway DJ Set; Grupo Salvaje; Aldo Linares; Gasteiz Gang | The Undertones; The Morning Benders; Zombie Zombie; The Marzipan Man; O Emperor; DJ Rojiblanco; Mondo Sonoro DJ's; The 1945 | Amable; Star Slinger; Spectrals; Smile; Logo; Los Ginkas; Sunta Templeton | Hidrogenesse; Anika; Chris Geddes DJ Set; And So I Watch You From Afar; Aldo Linares; Indienella |

Jack Daniels Stage Saturday

- The Dandies

== 2012 Festival ==
The 2012 Festival took place from 12–15 July 2012.

=== Maravillas ===
| Thursday | Friday | Saturday | Sunday |
| Florence and the Machine – Cancelled due to illness; At the Drive-In; The Horrors; Example; Pony Bravo; Los Tiki Phantoms | Bob Dylan; Bombay Bicycle Club; Chase & Status; The Maccabees; Miles Kane; Disappears | The Stone Roses; Noel Gallagher's High Flying Birds; Crystal Castles; Jessie J; School of Seven Bells; Delorentos | New Order; David Guetta; Ed Sheeran; The Vaccines; Cooper; The Secret Society |

=== Trident Senses ===
| Thursday | Friday | Saturday | Sunday |
| De La Soul; Bat for Lashes - Canceled; Dave Clarke; Kurt Vile & the Violators; Yuksek; Lisa Hannigan; Tuya; Chin Yi; Arveene & Misk | Katy B; Little Dragon; Sebastian; Jero Romero; Oscar Mulero; La Habitación Roja; Klaus & Kinski; Arp Attack; Viktor Flores | Dizzee Rascal; Maverick Sabre; Buzzcocks; Robyn Hitchcook & The Venus 3; The Shit Robot; Department S; Damian Schwartz; Modulok | La Casa Azul; Little Boots; Agoria Presents: Forms; Stevie Jackson; Spector; Maya Janes Coles; The Crookes; Juanita Y Los Feds |

=== FIB Club ===
| Thursday | Friday | Saturday | Sunday |
| —N/a | Django Django; Zola Jesus; Timber Timbre; Joe Crepúsculo; Virginia Diaz; Smart; Los Hermanos Pizarro; Sons Phonetic | Fujiya & Miyagi; Matmos; The New Raemon; Ham Sandwich; Blanca DB; Don Gonzalo; Kidd Ross; Ligers | Totally Enormous Extinct Dinosaurs; The Antlers; Howler; Todd Terje; Aldo Linares; Thee Brandy Hips; Two Pias (DJ set); Kauf Vintage (DJ set) |

== Controversy ==
FIB has received criticism from nationalist sectors in Spain, aimed at the fact that it does not support Valencian culture, even though it takes place in the Valencian Community and receives a high amount of public money to finance itself. FIB's director Jose Luis Morán stated in an interview that he did not intend to include any band in the festival that had lyrics in Catalan, Euskera or Galego. Among the people and associations that have criticized this is Marina Albiol, an Esquerra Unida politician.
