= Contempopránea Music Festival =

Contempopránea
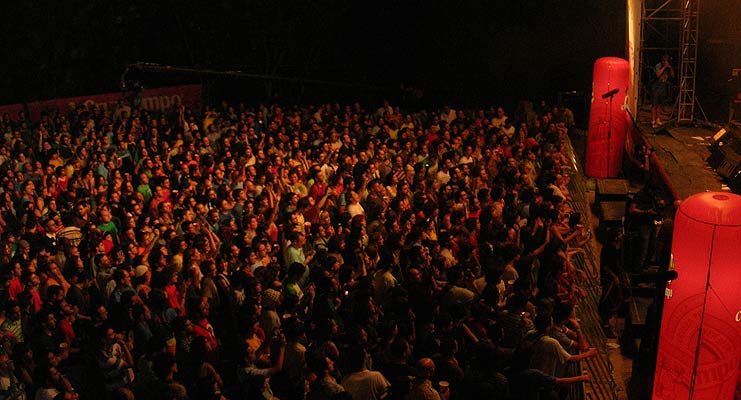
- Audience at the Contempopránea during the show of La Buena Vida.
- Genre: Indie pop, Twee pop
- Dates: last weekend of July
- Locations: Alburquerque, Badajoz, Spain
- Years active: 1996 - currently
- Website: contempopranea.com

Contempopránea is an Indie pop Music festival that takes place every summer in Alburquerque, Badajoz; however, since 2014, the festival has been divided between this city and the capital city of Badajoz. During the festival, many artists of the Spanish indie music and thousands of their followers meet.

The festival, which was first celebrated in 1996, after being verified the success of festivals like the Benicàssim, has been consolidated like a fundamental reference inside the universe of indie festivals that are celebrated in Spain. The dynamic of this festival is quite different to the one in the rest of the mass music festivals, this is because of its only stage, its short 2 days duration, its limited capacity (around 4000 people), and forever audience who normally repeat the experience every year.

Every year, it is also organized a tribute to a legendary group which is already dissolved, like, for example, The Smiths, Family, Los Flechazos... fro what every group invited to the festival have to play a song of the group selected for that year.

== Artists that have been playing in Contempopránea ==
The festival is mainly organized for Spanish indie groups, but there has also been some foreign groups at the festival, even so, the Spanish ones are the predominant ones.

- Amaral
- Astrid
- Astrud
- Bloomington
- Carrots
- Catpeople
- Cecilia Ann
- Cooper
- Cola Jet Set
- Chucho
- Deluxe
- Deneuve
- Deviot
- Digital 21
- Ellos
- Fangoria
- Los Fresones Rebeldes
- Galáctica
- Garzón ahora Grande-Marlaska
- Grupo de Expertos Solynieve
- Individual
- Izal
- Juniper Moon
- L-Kan
- La Bien Querida
- La Buena Vida
- La Casa Azul
- Lacrosse
- La Granja
- La Habitación Roja
- La Monja Enana
- Lori Meyers
- Los Magnéticos
- Love of Lesbian
- Maga
- Maika Makovski
- Me Enveneno de Azules
- Mercromina
- Meteosat
- Nadadora
- Napoleon Solo
- Niños Mutantes
- Nóbel
- Nosoträsh
- Pauline en la Playa
- Los Planetas
- Polar
- Russian Red
- Señor Chinarro
- Sexy Sadie
- Sidonie
- Tender Trap
- Tarik y la fabrica de colores
- The Sunday Drivers
- Underwear Tea Party
- Vacaciones
- Vetusta Morla
- We Are Standard
- Nacho Vegas
- Los Autonautas
- Hipo
- Cajón de Sastre
- Diane
- Supertennis

At the same time, this festival has also been an opportunity for a lot of groups, because previously to the festival, it ir organized a demo competition.
