= Summercase =

Music festival

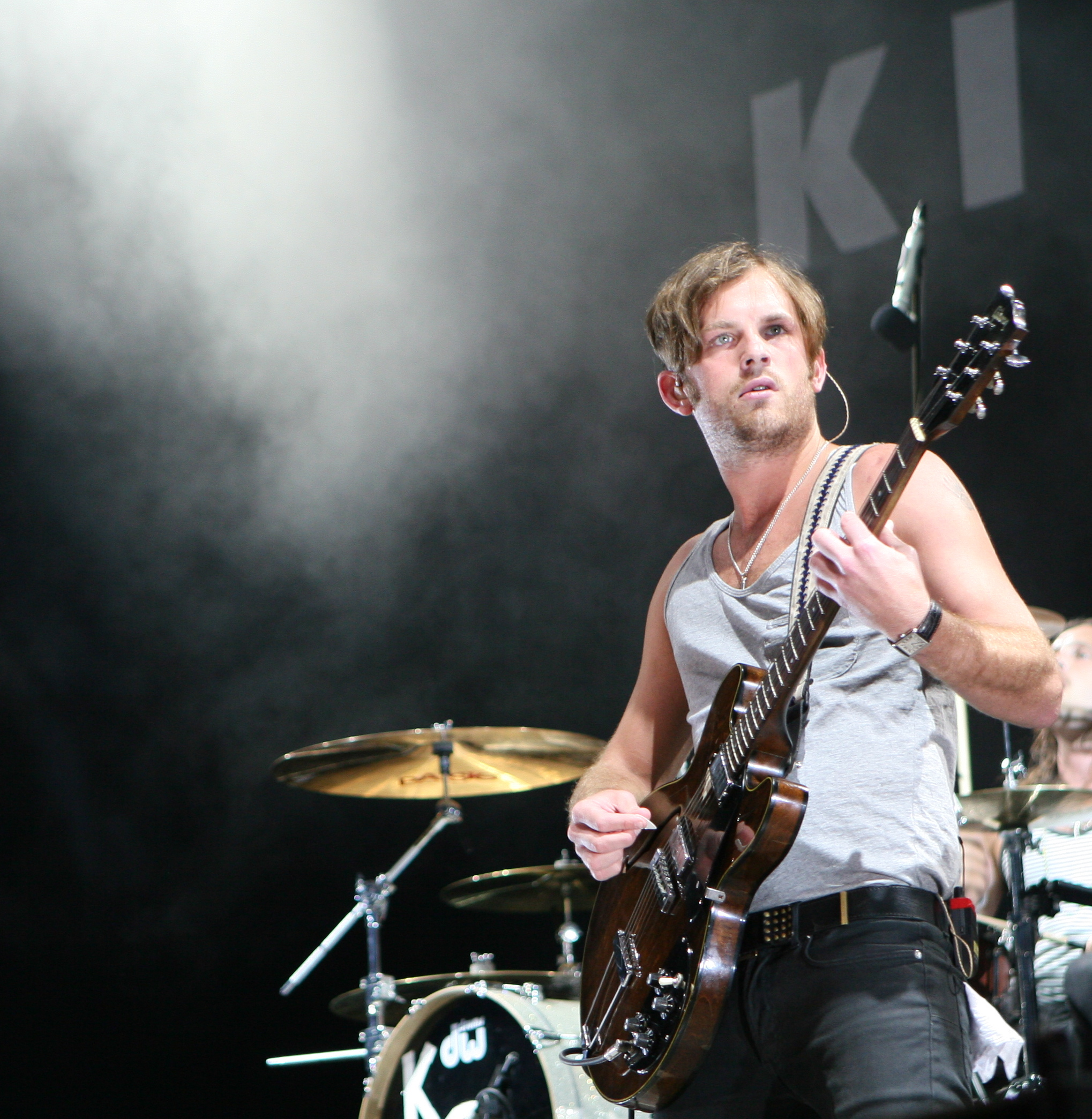
- Kings of Leon at the Summercase festival in Barcelona, 2008
- Genre: Rock, Pop
- Dates: 14 and 15 July 2006; 13 and 14 July 2007; 18 and 19 July 2008
- Locations: Spain: Madrid; Barcelona
- Years active: 2006–2008

Summercase was a two-day music festival held simultaneously in Barcelona and Madrid. The schedules were the same but reverted. The line up mainly consists of indie rock, electronic music and indie pop. Hence, the festival tries to blend indie pop, rock music and dance music into one. The first edition of the festival was organized in July 2006, with a total public of over 60,000. The second edition was celebrated on 13 and 14 July 2007, attracting over 109,000. In only one year, the festival has become one of the most important ones of Europe. It also falls into the category of world-famous music festivals such as the Denmark's Roskilde Festival, the Dutch Pinkpop, Ireland's Oxegen, the Spanish International Music Festival of Benicàssim or the major festivals in the UK: T in the Park, Reading Festival, Leeds Festival, the V Festival and Glastonbury Festival and may be compared to California's Coachella Festival or Chicago's Lollapalooza.

== 2006 Line-up ==
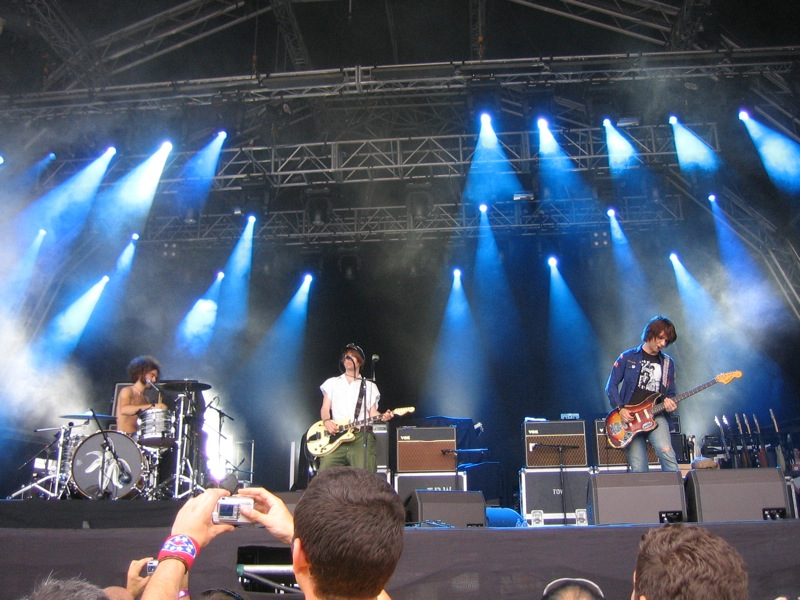
The Dandy Warhols at the 2006 festival in Barcelona.

- Adam Green
- Astrud
- Bell Orchestre
- Belle & Sebastian
- The Boyfriends
- The Brakes
- The Cardigans
- Carl Cox
- Captain
- The Chemical Brothers
- The Concretes
- Cut Copy
- Daft Punk
- The Dandy Warhols
- David Kitt
- Director
- Dirty Pretty Things
- The Divine Comedy
- Fatboy Slim
- The Feeling
- Happy Mondays
- Hope of the States
- James Murphy
- Keane
- Larry Tee
- The Long Blondes
- Maxïmo Park
- Massive Attack
- Midlake
- New Order
- My Latest Novel
- Mystery Jets
- The Paddingtons
- Primal Scream
- Razorlight
- Rufus Wainwright
- Shout Out Louds
- Sigur Rós
- Soulsavers
- Sparks
- The Spinto Band
- Starsailor
- Super Furry Animals
- Trabant
- The Twilight Singers
- Two Gallants

== 2007 Line-up ==
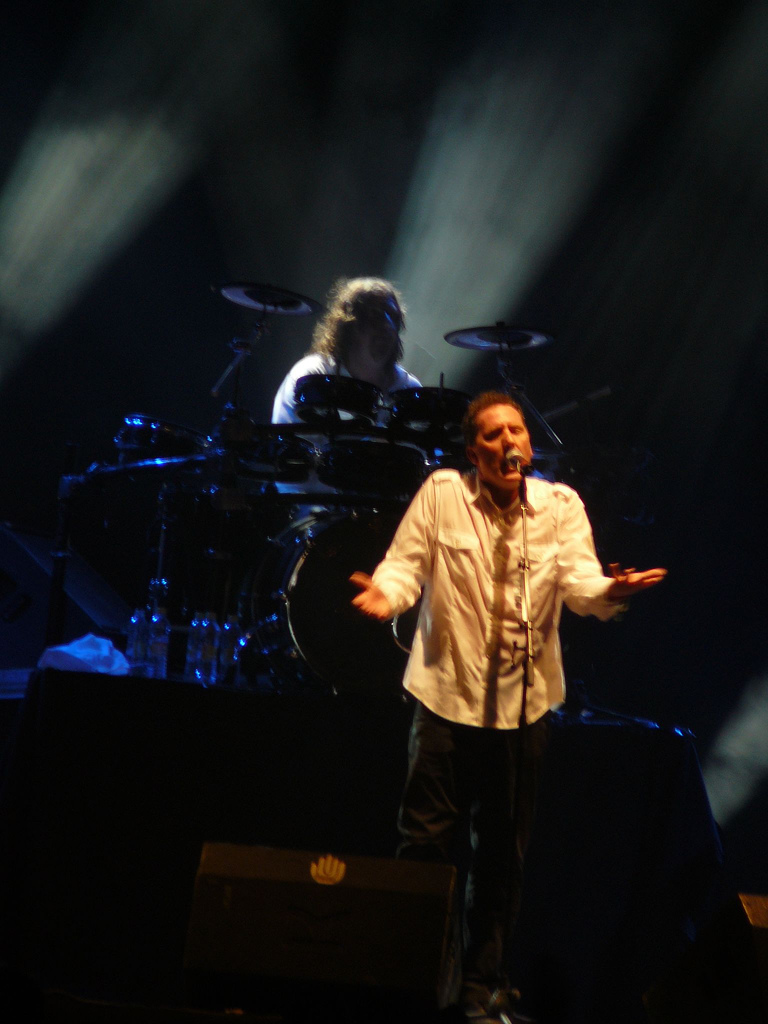
Orchestral Manoeuvres in the Dark at the 2007 festival in Madrid.

- !!!
- 1990s
- 2manydjs
- Air
- Arcade Fire
- Alex Torío
- Astrud
- Badly Drawn Boy
- Belle & Sebastian
- Bloc Party
- Bromheads Jacket
- The Chemical Brothers
- DJ Shadow
- Dragonette
- Editors
- Electrelane
- Felix Da Housecat
- Fionn Regan
- The Flaming Lips
- The Glimmers
- The Gossip
- Guillemots
- The Hidden Cameras
- The Hours
- James
- Jarvis Cocker
- The Jesus and Mary Chain
- Kaiser Chiefs
- LCD Soundsystem
- Lily Allen
- The Maccabees
- Mika
- My Brightest Diamond
- OMD (Orchestral Manoeuvres in the Dark)
- Perry Blake
- Phoenix
- The Pigeon Detectives
- PJ Harvey
- Ratatat
- Scissor Sisters
- Soulsavers & Mark Lanegan
- The Sunday Drivers
- The Twang
- The View
- The Whitest Boy Alive

== 2008 Line-up ==
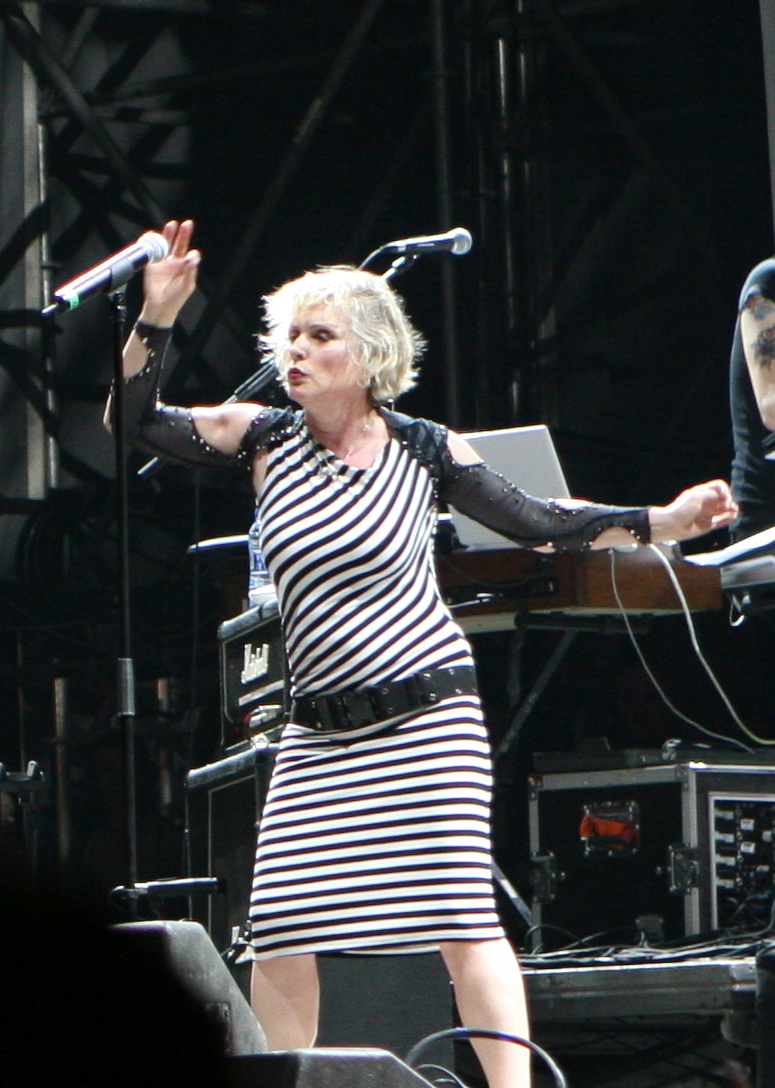
Blondie at the 2008 festival in Barcelona.

- Blondie
- Grinderman
- Interpol
- Maxïmo Park
- Primal Scream
- The Verve
- 2manydjs
- Cornelius
- Edwyn Collins
- Etienne de Crécy
- Ian Brown
- We Are Scientists
- Cadence Weapon
- Hidrogenesse
- Juan Maclean
- One Night Only
- Patrice
- Santogold (cancelled)
- Sons and Daughters
- The Breeders
- Kaiser Chiefs
- Kings of Leon
- Mogwai
- Los Planetas
- Sex Pistols
- CSS
- Foals
- The Kooks
- The Raveonettes
- The Stranglers
- Tiga
- Biffy Clyro
- Los Campesinos!
- Mystery Jets
- Pete and the Pirates
- Shout Out Louds
- The Magnetic Fields
- Bloc Party

=== Incidents ===
On Saturday July 19, 2008, following an incident at Summercase in Barcelona, Bloc Party frontman Kele Okereke claimed that he was verbally insulted by Sex Pistols frontman John Lydon and physically attacked by his "entourage". Okereke said that he was "set upon" by three members of Lydon's crew after praising Lydon's musical past and inquiring on the future of Lydon's group Public Image Ltd. One of Lydon's friends then told Okereke: "Your problem is your black attitude", and Lydon and members of his security detail attacked Ricky Wilson of Kaiser Chiefs and Yannis Philippakis of Foals when they attempted to aid Okereke. Philippakis informed the crowd at Latitude Festival the next day that the incident was so bad that he had been handcuffed and nearly didn't make it. Whilst the incident was witnessed by more than 50 people, including members of Mystery Jets, Kaiser Chiefs, Foals, Mogwai and The Raveonettes, Okereke's version of the events are disputed by Lydon. However Neon Neon and Super Furry Animals frontman Gruff Rhys, who also witnessed the incident, backed Okereke, describing it as "horrific". Rhys stated Kele was "a very brave man" and told MTV News that "the statements Kele has said are absolutely true. What he said is exactly what happened."

== End of the festival ==
In 2009, the festival wasn't reconducted for economic reasons.
