= Rumble Strips =

Rumble Strips may refer to:

- Rumble strip, the road safety feature
- The Rumble Strips, the British band

== See also ==
- Rumble Strip, a podcast
