= The Bishops =

British musical group

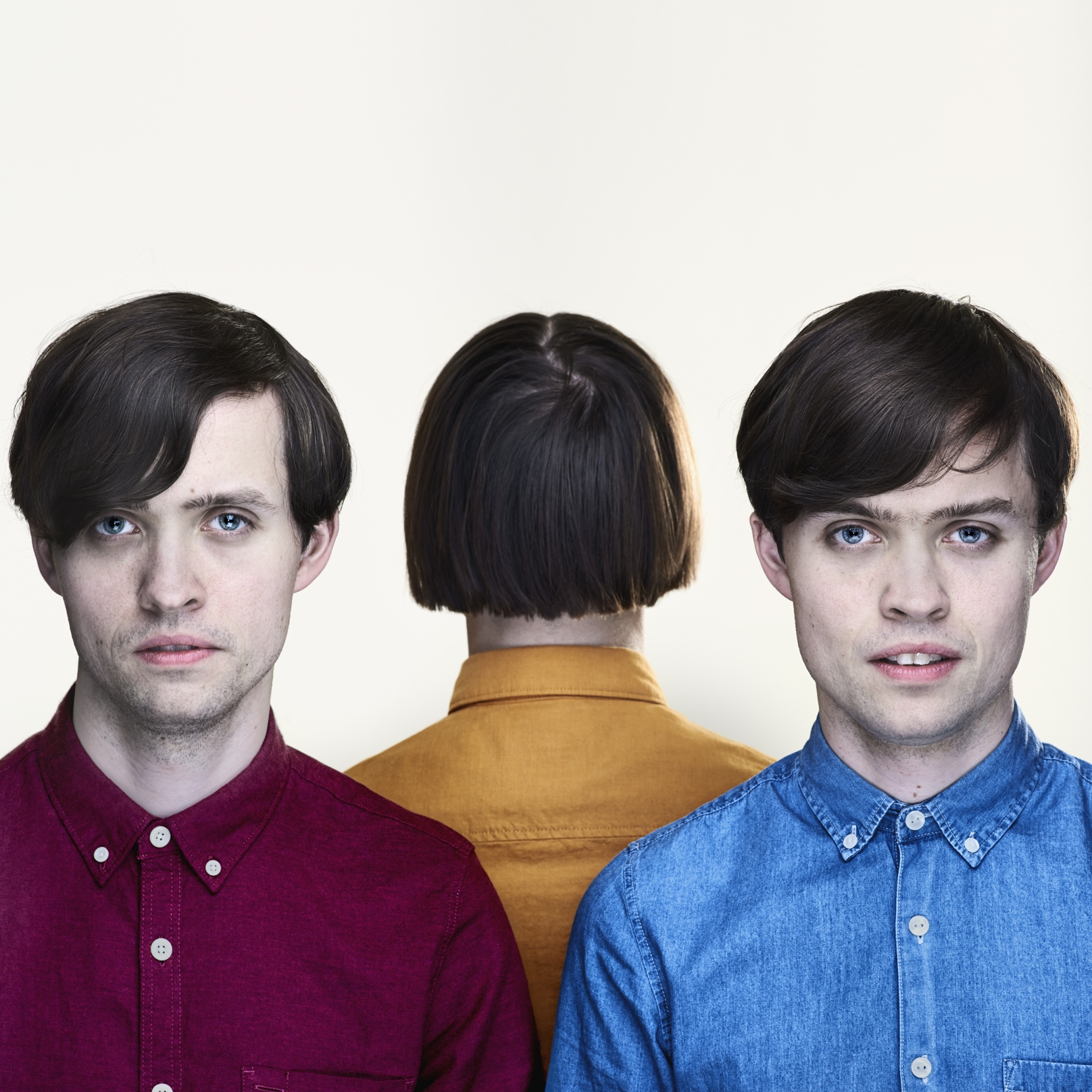

Background information
- Origin: London, England
- Genres: Indie rock Alternative
- Years active: 2002–present
- Labels: 1234 Records, W2 Records, Weekender Records
- Members: Mike Bishop; Pete Bishop; Chris McConville
- Past members: Alex Bishop
- Website: www.thebishopsband.com

The Bishops are a British indie rock band from London, England, who formed in 2002. The band has released three albums.

== History ==
=== Early years ===
The band formed in 2002 when twins Mike and Pete Bishop met drummer Chris Mcconville while working at 'The Kings Head', a pub close to the local YMCA in Barbican where they were living at the time. The band gigged regularly on the London scene during between 2002 and 2005, and would often play with bands associated with Chelsea College of Art which bassist Pete Bishop attended as an undergraduate. The early sound of the band was rooted in punk and rock and roll but would later develop a harmony vocal sound that was inspired by early 1960s influences. This would become a distinctive trademark of the band as well as their monochrome matching suits that would often be a talking point in interviews. The band met manager Grant Box in 2005 during this development in their sound and look and would later record a self-released single called "I Don't Really Know What To Say". On one occasion the single was played on XFM by John Kennedy prior to Paul McCartney's appearance on the program. During this period the band played with acts such as Billy Childish, Vincent Vincent and the Villains and Neil's Children which would help build up interest around the group.

=== The Bishops ===
The eponymous album was recorded at Toe Rag Studios in London and produced by Liam Watson. It was an all analogue production recorded on tape. The Bishops first came to the attention of Liam Watson at a gig at The Social on Little Portland Street. 1234 records signed the band in 2006 and recording started on their first single "The Only Place I Can Look is Down". The album was released internationally across Europe and Japan in 2007. The band toured and promoted the album extensively. The band was supported by acts such as: The Enemy, Glasvegas, Reverend and the Makers and Laura Marling. During this period the band supported: The Fratellis, the Rakes, Jamie T, Plan B and Little Barrie. The band would feature at festivals such as: Bestival, Lovebox, 1234 festival, Tapestry, Trans musicales (France) and Frequency festival (Austria). The record gained support from XFM, BBC Radio 2, BBC 6 Music, Le Mouv (France), Virgin (Italy), FM4 (Austria) as well as making various TV appearances in Europe and Japan. The band featured in numerous newspapers and magazines including Rolling Stone, NME, Esquire, Dazed & Confused, The Guardian, and getting 'disques de mois' (album of the month) in French magazine Rock and Folk. Opening track "Menace About Town" featured on the BBC's Dragon's Den.

=== For Now ===
For Now was the second album recorded by The Bishops. The album was recorded at London's Bark studios by Brian O'Shaughnessy and the album continued in the harmony driven vein of the group's debut. It was released internationally in 2009. Opening track "City Lights" became number 1 on the playlist for Berlin's Radio eins station and the album found the band promoting and touring the album extensively, leading to a special event the band created to celebrate their 500th gig at the 100 club. During the album's release the group played at the Benicassim festival (Spain) on the main stage alongside Oasis and also supported James Blunt in the UK and Europe. They also featured on mainstream TV programmes such as the Niels Roff show (Germany) and Starmag (France).

=== "Sojourn" ===
At the end of 2009 younger brother Alex Bishop joined the band which created a wholesale change of musical style for the group. The 'Sojourn' EP was the result of this, drawing inspiration from odd meter, polyrhythmic structures and modal jazz. The title of the album was inspired in part by short trips the band would make to places in Europe for various gigs or short tours, as well as by the length of the EP, which was itself a 'sojourn' of 5 tracks.

=== All Lost Time ===
Following on from the new musical direction of "Sojourn", the band started work on a third album to expand on the same themes. Titled "All Lost Time", the album was in part produced and recorded by Mark Sutherland and Cherif Hasizume at Cafe Music studios in Bow, East London. During this period Alex Bishop decided to leave the band to pursue his work as a guitar luthier. He no longer plays live with the band and the group are back to their original three piece line up. The band played a special release gig at the Sebright Arms in Hackney, to launch the release of the album. A special video with 2500 illustrations was made for the single 'Polygonn'. This became a ‘staff pick’ on infamous videomaker website Vimeo. Each vinyl edition of the album came with an original illustration from the video inserted in each copy, making each one unique.

== Band members ==
- Mike Bishop – Vocals and Guitar
- Pete Bishop – Vocals and Bass
- Chris McConville – Drums

== Former band members ==
- Alex Bishop – Vocals, Guitar and Keys

== Discography ==
=== Albums ===
- 2007 The Bishops
- 2009 For Now
- 2013 All Lost Time

=== EPs ===
- 2010 "Sojourn"

=== Singles ===
- 2005 "I Don't Really Know What To Say"
- 2006 "The Only Place I Can Look Is Down"
- 2006 "Higher Now"
- 2006 "Breakaway"
- 2007 "I Can't Stand It Anymore"
- 2008 "City lights"
- 2009 "If You Leave Today"
- 2009 "Hold On"
- 2014 "Polygonn / All Points In Between"
