= Metope (disambiguation) =

A metope is the space between two triglyphs of a Doric frieze.

Metope may also refer to:

- Metope (mythology), a river nymph in Greek mythology
- Metope (producer), electronic music producer Michael Schwanen
- Métopes Op.29, a piano work by Karol Szymanowski

== See also ==
- Metopes of the Parthenon, notably on the Parthenon
