= Saturday Night Fiber =

Music festival in Madrid, Spain

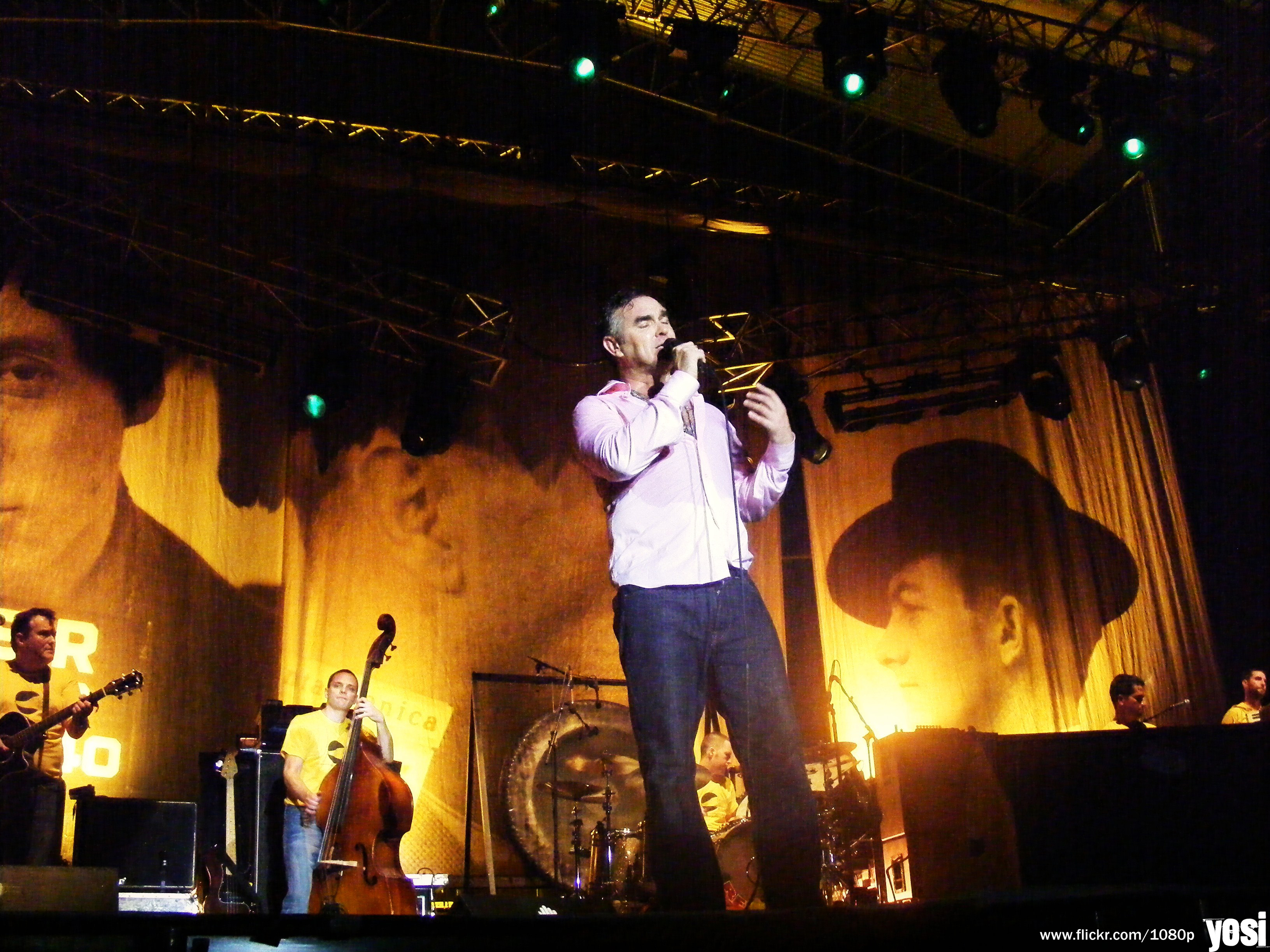
- Morrissey performing at the festival on May 22, 2008
- Genre: Various, mainly alternative rock and electronica
- Dates: Saturday of Benicàssim Festival, July of each year
- Locations: (Spain) Juan Carlos I Auditorium, Campo de las Naciones, Madrid
- Years active: 2008
- Founders: Maraworld S.A. Production team

Saturday Night Fiber was a small-scale music festival in Madrid, Spain that took place in 2008. It took place on the Saturday night of its similar sister festival, the Festival Internacional de Benicàssim, from which it took its name. The two festivals also had similar line-ups. The festival took place in the Juan Carlos I Auditorium, a large, 12,000-capacity complex incorporating an open air music venue and surrounding greenery. The festival is also known as "Benicàssim day in Madrid".

== Conception ==
Saturday Night Fiber was somewhat of a Benicàssim spin-off; organisers of the festival said that they created the festival to "geographically diversify the cultural offering of its brother festival", and had spent a number of years looking for a second location since the first Benicàssim in 1995. In contrast to Benicàssim, the festival lasts overnight, as opposed to a full camping music festival.

== 2008 festival ==
The 2008 inaugural festival took place on July 19, 2008, during the Saturday night-Sunday morning of Benicàssim. Tickets were priced at €60 for a general admittance ticket, with an optional VIP ticket available for €90. A VIP ticket allowed holders an exclusive entrance to the venue, and access to a VIP grandstand and bar. There was also a limited car parking facility available.

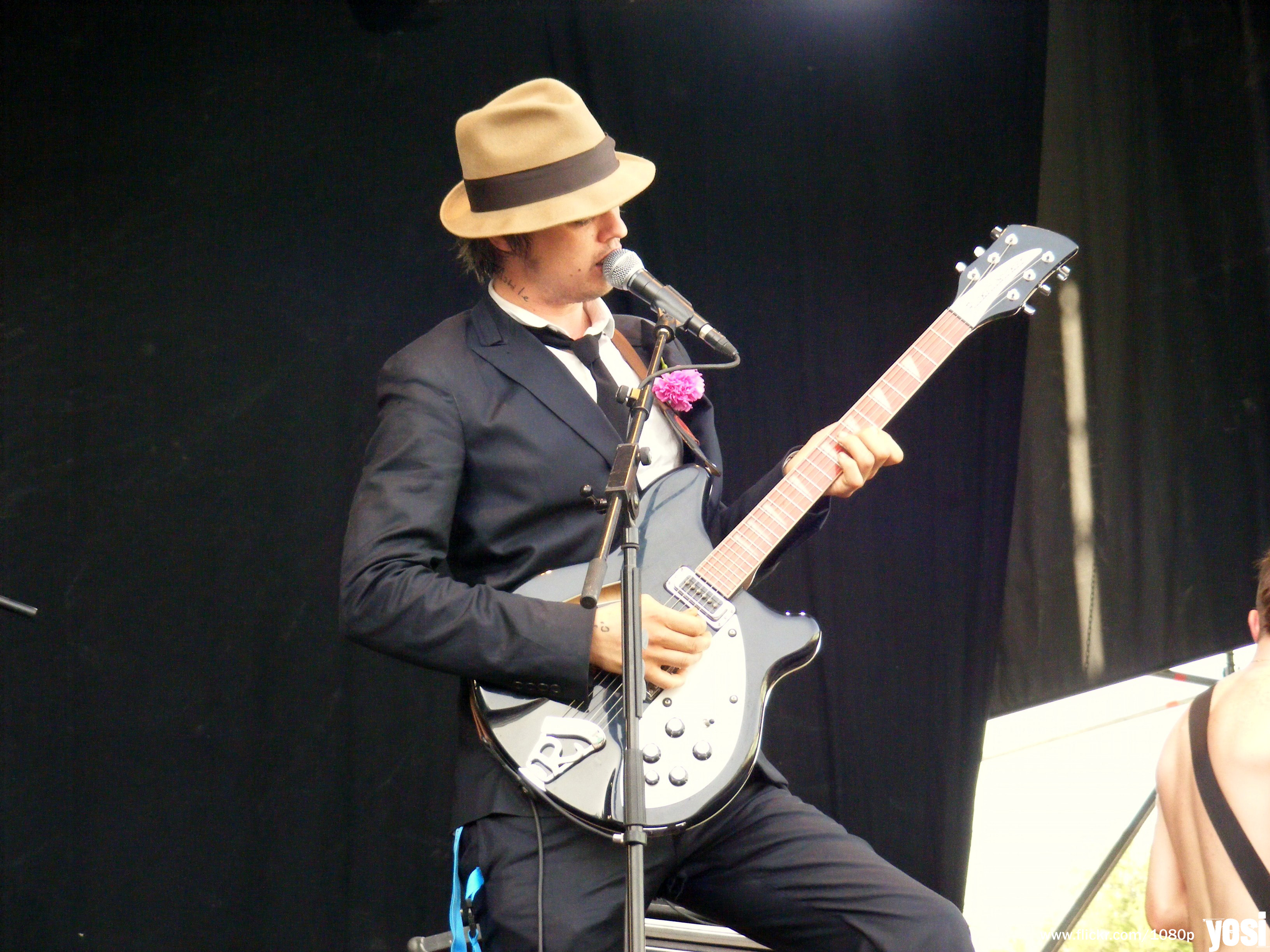
Babyshambles' Pete Doherty performing

The bands, in order of appearance, played as follows:

Saturday 19 July
- The Rumble Strips
- Babyshambles
- Siouxsie
- Morrissey
- My Bloody Valentine
- Hot Chip
- Mika
- DJ Supermarkt

Morrissey was billed as headlining the event, although unlike most music festivals, he was not the final act to play the festival. Sets by My Bloody Valentine, Hot Chip and Mika all followed Morrissey, despite being billed lower in the line-up. In a live review, Clash actually noted the later slot of My Bloody Valentine as the festival's highlight.

Morrissey's headline performance was noted as being his first in Madrid in twenty-three years, having last played there with The Smiths. My Bloody Valentine were playing their debut concert in Spain, while Siouxsie was also playing her first concert in the capital since playing with Siouxsie and the Banshees seventeen years earlier. It was announced that on the day following the event, Gnarls Barkley would be performing their 2008 album The Odd Couple at the Sala Heineken, also in Madrid. This was another Maraworld associated event; the duo had headlined the Escenario Verde (Main Stage) the day before at Benicàssim (the same day as the Saturday Night Fiber event).

Branching into an area outside of live music, the saturday night fiber festival also included a "Do it yourself" catwalk project, presented by Mustang. The catwalk was held between bands in the greenery surrounding the festival, and allowed entry to anyone who wished to participate. It was organised to observe the fashion trends of those attending the festival. Awards were presented at the end of the festival.

== Failure ==
In the press conference hold on 19 July 2008, festival organisers had named the festival an "urban celebration that is here to stay" and that it could become a multi-day festival, suggesting there would be more incarnations in the future. However, there were no further editions due to the lack of success of that first and unique night.
