= Alburquerque, Spain =

Alburquerque
- Municipality
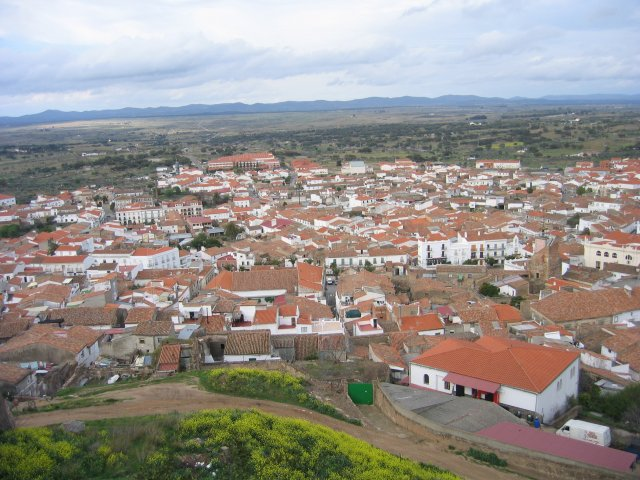
- The town as seen from its castle in 2005

- Flag Coat of arms

- Location of Alburquerque within Extremadura Alburquerque (Spain)
- Coordinates: 39°13′9″N 7°00′4″W
- Country: Spain
- Autonomous Community: Extremadura
- Province: Badajoz

Government
  - Mayor: Manuel Luis Gutiérrez Regalado (IPAL)

Area
  - Total: 723 km^{2} (279 sq mi)
- Elevation (AMSL): 506 m (1,660 ft)

Population (2025-01-01)
  - Total: 4,928
  - Density: 6.82/km^{2} (17.7/sq mi)
- Time zone: UTC+1 (CET)
  - Summer (DST): UTC+2 (CEST (GMT +2))
- Postal code: 06510
- Area code: +34 (Spain) + 924 (Badajoz)
- Website: www.alburquerque.es

Alburquerque (Spanish: [alβuɾˈkeɾke], Portuguese: Albuquerque, European Portuguese pronunciation: [aɫβuˈkɛɾkɨ]) is a town in the province of Badajoz in Spain. It has 5,340 inhabitants, as of 2018. The town is close to the border with Portugal and was an ancient dominion of the kings of that country.

The titles of Lord of Alburquerque (de Meneses) and later Count of Alburquerque (de Castilla) and Duke of Alburquerque (de La Cueva) were important in Castile in the Middle Ages (e.g. Sancho of Castile, Count of Alburquerque).

Its sister city of Albuquerque, New Mexico in the United States takes its name from this town.

== History ==
=== Population ===
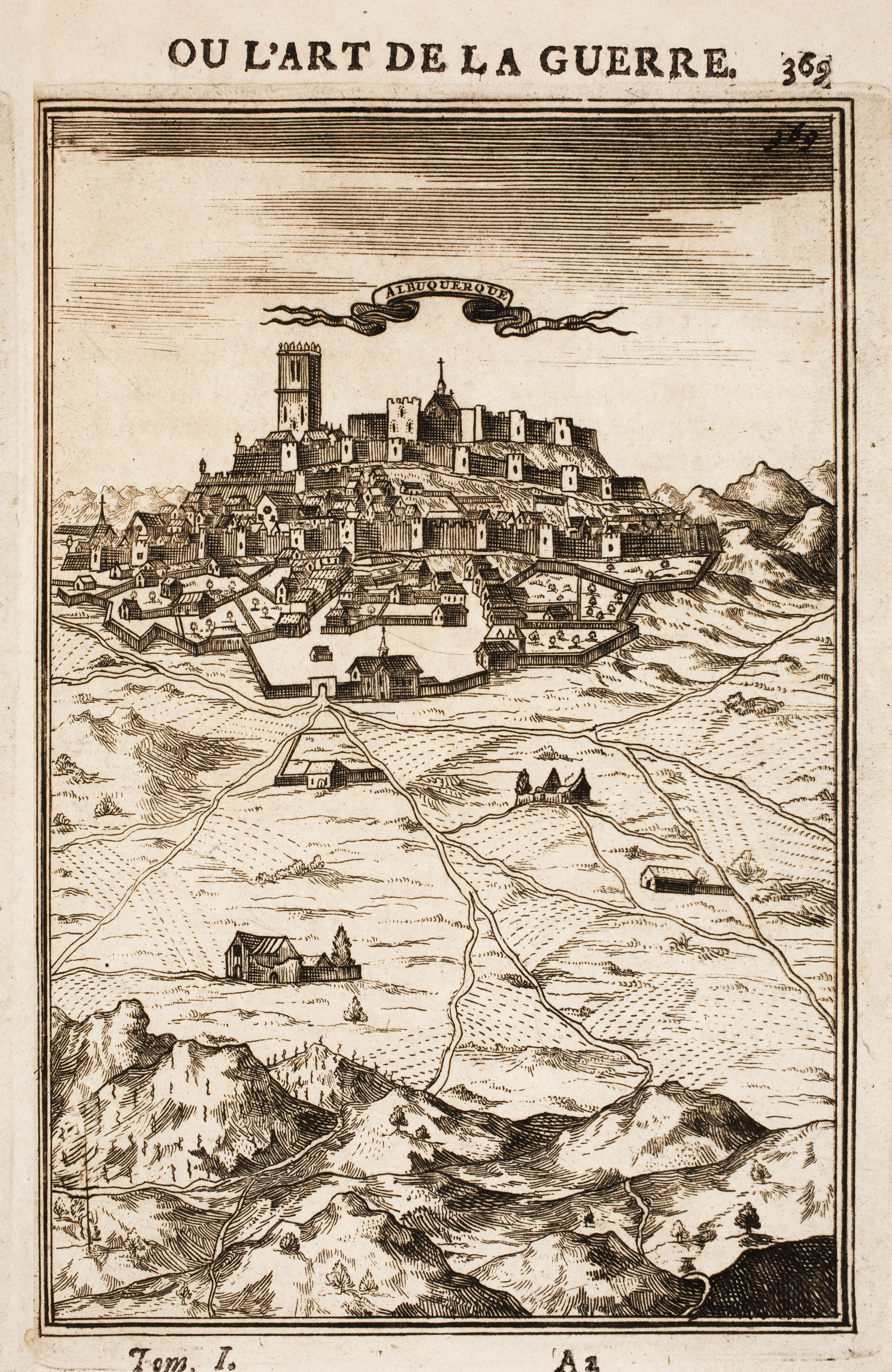
Fortified town of Alburquerque by the late 17th century. Alain Manesson Mallet: Travaux de Mars ou l'Art de la Guerre.

By 1530, the town had a population of 6,042, increasing up to 6,893 by the end of the century (1591) and to 7,600 in 1631.

As of 2018, the town's population is 5,340.

== Music ==
- Contempopránea Music Festival

== See also ==
- List of municipalities in Badajoz
