= Girls and Weather =

Studio album by The Rumble Strips
- Released: September 10, 2007
- Genre: Rock
- Length: 37:46
- Label: Fallout
- Producer: Tony Hoffer

The Rumble Strips chronology
Girls and Weather (2007)	Welcome to the Walk Alone (2009)

Professional ratings
Aggregate scores
Source	Rating
Metacritic	72/100
Review scores
Source	Rating
AllMusic	3.5/5 stars
NME	7/10 stars
Q	4/5 stars
Rocklouder	3/5 stars
Spin	4/5 stars

Girls and Weather is the debut album from the Devon-based band The Rumble Strips. It was released on September 10, 2007 by the Island Records sub-label Fallout Records.

AllMusic reviewer Katherine Fulton said that "happy melodies coupled with bittersweet lyrics are a running theme throughout the album", being quick to note this is a good thing because "it's a formula that works well for the Rumble Strips." She sums up the album by saying it "loses neither steam nor charm throughout; it's an album for adults who want an excuse to behave like kids again." NME reviewer Jamie Fullerton focuses in particular on the frontman, indicating that the "cheesy, into-the-sunset fantasy is just another indication of Waller's total detachment from the current grot-rock set, just as he's detached from the cretins who brand him a Dexy's photocopier."

== Track listing ==
No.	Title	Length
1.	"No Soul"	2:44
2.	"Alarm Clock"	3:13
3.	"Building a Boat"	2:38
4.	"Girls and Boys in Love"	2:33
5.	"Oh Creole"	3:15
6.	"Motorcycle"	3:56
7.	"Time"	3:32
8.	"Clouds"	3:37
9.	"Don't Dumb Down"	2:53
10.	"Cowboy"	2:39
11.	"Hate Me (You Do)"	3:13
12.	"Hands"	3:32
13.	"Girls and Weather" (Japanese Edition Bonus Track)	3:44
14.	"The Boys Are Back in Town" (Japanese Edition Bonus Track)	4:07
15.	"Girls and Boys in Love (Hot Chip Remix)" (Japanese Edition Bonus Track)	3:45

== Personnel ==
=== Band ===
- Charlie Waller - guitar, vocals
- Henry Clark - trumpet, vocals, piano
- Tom Gorbutt - saxophone, vocals, bass
- Matthew Wheeler - drums

=== Production ===
- Todd Burke, Jason Gossman - engineers
- Jonathan de Villiers - photography
- Duncan Ellis - management
- Tappin Gofton - art direction, design
- Tony Hoffer - music producer, engineer, mixing
- Stephen Marcussen - mastering
