= Welcome to the Walk Alone =

Studio album by The Rumble Strips
- Released: 13 July 2009
- Genre: Rock
- Length: 31:26
- Label: Island
- Producer: Mark Ronson

The Rumble Strips chronology
Girls and Weather (2007)	Welcome to the Walk Alone (2009)	The Lightship Recordings - Part 1 (2016)

Professional ratings
Aggregate scores
Source	Rating
Metacritic	69/100
Review scores
Source	Rating
AllMusic	3/5 stars
Clash	7/10 stars
Daily Express	4/5 stars
Drowned in Sound	7/10 stars
Gigwise	2/5 stars
Metro	3/5 stars
Planet Sound	8/10 stars
The Guardian	4/5 stars
The Independent	(Positive)
The Telegraph	3/5 stars

Welcome to the Walk Alone is the second album from the Devon-based band The Rumble Strips. It was released on 13 July 2009 by Island Records, and was preceded by a single release in June. The title and release date were confirmed by the band on their website on 11 May 2009, whilst "London" was made available to download for free from the band's website on 23 March. The album leaked onto the internet on 4 June 2009.

== Background ==
Following The Rumble Strips' reinterpretation of Amy Winehouse's "Back to Black", Mark Ronson offered his services in producing the album in New York. On working with Ronson, the band commented: "He definitely had an idea about how he wanted it to sound. Certainly for the drums, he kind of built the sound around this particular technique of drums. And obviously coming in fresh, he sort of sat down and listened to the songs, and trimmed off bits. But he’s no megalomaniac, he doesn’t come in and insist it has to be 'this way', but he’s got ideas."

As part of their First Listen series of features, The-Fly.co.uk put up a track-by-track synopsis of Welcome to the Walk Alone on 26 May. Whilst stating that "Ronson's kitchen sink production is evident after little more than a minute," they said that the sound of the record is "lush", highlighting "Dem Girls", "Sweet Heart Hooligan" and "Daniel" as the album's highlights.

== Track listing ==
No.	Title	Length
1.	"Welcome to the Walk Alone"	2:44
2.	"London"	3:10
3.	"Not the Only Person"	2:20
4.	"Daniel"	2:57
5.	"Douglas"	2:37
6.	"Back Bone"	3:11
7.	"Sweetheart Hooligan"	1:53
8.	"Running on Empty"	2:27
9.	"Dem Girls"	2:55
10.	"Raindrops"	3:29
11.	"Happy Hell"	3:23

== Personnel ==
The Rumble Strips

- Charles Waller – guitar, vocals
- Henry Clark – trumpet, vocals, piano
- Tom Gorbutt – saxophone, vocals, guitar
- Matthew Wheeler – drums
- Sam Mansbridge – bass guitar

Technical personnel

- Mark Ronson – producer
- Owen Pallett – string arrangements
