= La Bien Querida =

Spanish singer

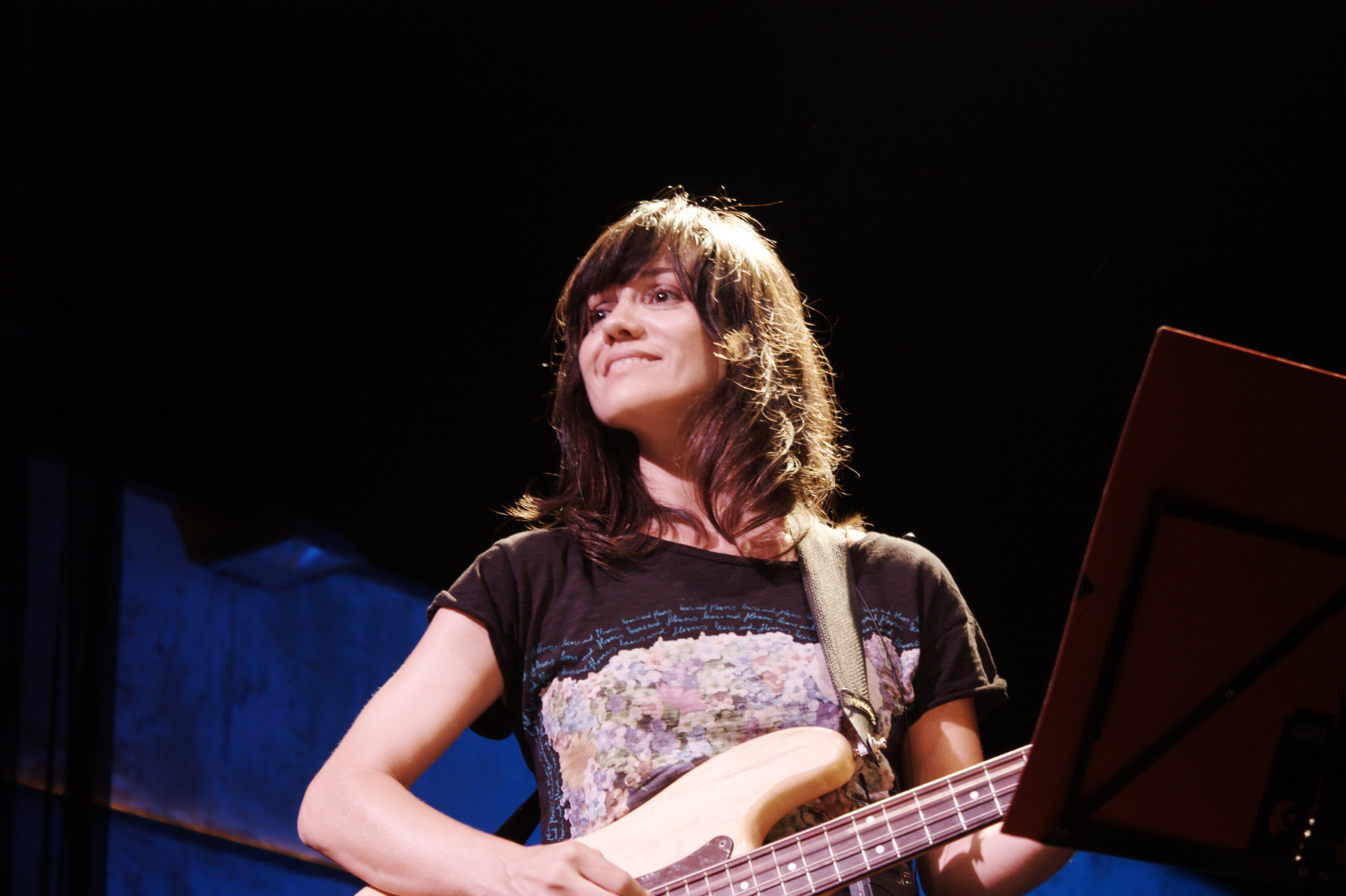
- Ana Fernández-Villaverde at a live concert playing electric bass.

Background information
- Also known as: La Bien Querida
- Born: Ana Fernández-Villaverde; 6 November 1972 (age 53)
- Origin: Bilbao, Spain
- Genre: Indie rock
- Instrument: Vocals
- Years active: 2005 – present
- Label: Elefant Records

La Bien Querida (The Well Liked) is the stage name Ana Fernández-Villaverde (born in Bilbao, November 6, 1972) used to develop her musical career. A painter by trade, she decided to initiate in 2007 her trajectory into the music world, motivated by the frontman of Los Planetas.

== Biography ==
In 2007, and supported by Horacio Nistal, she recorded her first demo, which would be selected as the best demo of the year by the magazine Mondosonoro.

2008 brought various updates supported by Antonio Luque's group and EP by the label Elefant Records with which, in 2009, she published her debut album Romancero, produced by David Rodríguez (frontman of Beef and La Estrella de David), who recovered the seven songs from the EP and five more. Romancero was chosen as best national disc of 2009 by the magazines Mondosonoro and Rockdelux. Fernández-Villaverde and Rodríguez continued working together, drawing from artists such as OMD, Depeche Mode and Grimes.

On March 7, 2011, the digital edition of their second album was released, Fiesta, followed by the CD on March 22.

Preceded by the single "Arenas movedizas", Ceremonia, her third studio album, went on sale November 5, 2012. Album that, according to the liner notes, sounded "darker and more electronic ending en some moments of an authentic symphony of infinite noises, cold and penetrating." ("más oscuro y electrónico terminando en algunos momentos en una auténtica sinfonía de ruidos infinitos, fríos y penetrantes").

In 2017, she published her fourth album, "Fuego", with Elefant records.

"Brujería" was her sixth album, also published on Elefant Records.

Her following album, "Paprika", was released in a different record label, Sonido Muchacho on 2022.

== Discography ==
=== Albums ===
- Romancero (Elefant Records 2009).
1. Ya no
2. Corpus Christi
3. De momento abril
4. A.D.N.
5. 9.6
6. Cuando lo intentas
7. El zoo absoluto
8. Medidas de seguridad
9. Bendita
10. Santa Fe
11. Los estados generales
12. Golpe de Estado

Produced by David Rodríguez. In collaboration with the Arab Orchestra of Barcelona and Joe Crepúsculo. Music videos of the canciones De momento abril (dirigido por Les Nouveaux Auteurs), 9.6 (dirigido por Luis Cerveró), and Corpus Christi (dirigido por Nadia Mata Portillo) were made.

- Fiesta (Elefant Records 2011).
1. Noviembre
2. Hoy
3. Queridos tamarindos
4. Sentido común
5. Piensa como yo
6. Cuando el amor se olvida
7. La muralla china
8. Monte de piedad
9. En el hemisferio austral
10. Me quedo por aquí
11. Monumentos en la luna
12. Lunes de Pascua

Produced by David Rodríguez. A music video de la canción Hoy was filmed (directed by CANADA).

- Ceremonia (Elefant Records, 2012)
1. Arenas movedizas
2. Luna nueva
3. Hechicera
4. Carnaval
5. A veces ni eso
6. Los picos de Europa
7. Pelea
8. Aurora
9. Más fuerte que tú
10. Mil veces
- Premeditación, nocturnidad y alevosía (Elefant Records, 2015)

CD compilation of their three 12" maxi-singles Premeditación, Nocturnidad, and Alevosía

1. Poderes extraños
2. El origen del mundo
3. Alta tensión
4. Disimulando
5. Ojalá estuvieras muerto
6. Encadenados
7. Carretera secundaria
8. Crepúsculo
9. Música contemporánea
10. Vueltas
11. Geometría existencial
12. Muero de amor
- Fuego (Elefant Records, 2017)
- Brujería (Elefant Records, 2019)
- Paprika (Sonido Muchacho, 2022)

=== Singles and EPs ===
- 9.6 (Elefant Records 2009 ER-375 cd-single).
1. 9.6 (Romancero)
2. 9.6 (Milkyway Dreamy Mix) (remezcla de Guille Milkyway)
3. 9.6 (French Hot Dog) (remezcla de Hidrogenesse)
4. 9.6 (En casa de Ana) (versión de la maqueta)
5. 9.6 (vídeo musical)
- Hoy (Elefant Records 2011, sólo disponible en digital format).
1. Hoy
- Queridos Tamarindos (Elefant Records 2011 ER-288 single 7" en vinilo rojo).
1. Queridos Tamarindos
2. No es terrestre
3. Diferente
- Arenas movedizas (Elefant Records 2012, sólo disponible en digital format).
1. Arenas movedizas
- Premeditación (Elefant Records 2014, maxi-single 12")
1. Poderes extraños
2. El origen del mundo
3. Alta tensión
4. Disimulando
- Nocturnidad (Elefant Records 2014, maxi-single 12")
1. Ojalá estuvieras muerto
2. Encadenados
3. Carretera secundaria
4. Crepúsculo
- Alevosía (Elefant Records 2015, maxi-single 12")
1. Música contemporánea
2. Vueltas
3. Geometría existencial
4. Muero de amor

=== Collaborations ===
La Bien Querida has done, to date, the following collaborations:

- Vocals on the song "Tú hueles mejor" on the album En la cama con Anntona (Gramaciones Grabofónicas 2009) de Anntona, guitarist of Los Punsetes.
- Vocals on No sé cómo te atreves and La veleta from the Los Planetas disk, Una ópera egipcia (Octubre / Sony Music Entertainment 2010).
- Voz en el tema "Ciencias Exactas" del single homónimo de Ed Wood Lovers, editado por Elefant Records en 2011.
