= Rumble Strip =

Society and Culture podcast by Erica Heilman

- Genre: Society; Culture

Cast and voices
- Hosted by: Erica Heilman

Production
- Length: 30–110 minutes

Technical specifications
- Audio format: MP3

Publication
- No. of episodes: 244
- Original release: May 1, 2013
- Updates: Monthly

Rumble Strip is a Vermont focused Society and Culture podcast, created by Erica Heilman, featuring uncommon conversations with everyday people. The show covers true life portraits of "road-crew workers, defense attorneys, farmers, Vermont’s mental-health-care system, taxidermists" and numerous rural subjects.

== Production ==
Growing up in Charlotte, Vermont, Heilman would observe her father chatting thoughtfully with his neighbor, and she felt inspired to want to speak with people the way her father did. After her time as a freelance television producer in New York City, Heilman found herself working as a private investigator which led to her interviewing people about their lives.

Heilman started out creating the episodes in her spare time, between working as a single mother with a part time job, releasing episodes weekly. Within the first two years of creating the show, Rumble Strip gained notoriety for lacking a clear narrative arc and defying easy categorization, as Heilman was primarily focused on creating a show about "the ephemera of trying to survive". The show garnered a loyal following as Heilman interviewed a variety of subjects, from prisoners to librarians, to salon owners recounting their days in the Vietnam War. She credits word of mouth as the main driver of the show's success.

In 2022, 99% Invisible featured Rumble Strip as a show about life in Vermont, but also about "life in general".

== Reception ==
In 2021, the episode "Finn and the Bell" won a Peabody Award, "for its tender treatment of a community in grief, and for embodying the power of local storytelling".

The NYTimes included Rumble Strip in their "Best Podcasts of 2022", calling it a "majestic, long-running and hard-to-classify series".

The show has received acclaim for its thorough and sensitive approach toward commonly difficult or controversial subject matter, such as gun control, death with dignity laws, and suicide.

== Episodes ==
No.	Title	Subject(s)	Duration	Release date
1	Colin McCaffrey Talks Shop		0:58:47	May 9, 2013
2	Miriam Bernardo		1:01:00	May 23, 2013
3	Road Scholars		0:49:42	June 7, 2013
4	Prisoners of War		0:56:01	July 19, 2013
5	Prisoner of Zion		0:45:46	August 3, 2013
6	That Song		0:30:40	August 14, 2013
7	Geof Hewitt		0:49:37	September 12, 2013
8	Deer Hunting			March 17, 2014
9	Thunder Road		0:11:57	July 19, 2014
10	Vermont Health Disconnect		0:7:07	August 17, 2014
11	Strange Days		0:22:27	August 25, 2014
12	The Taxidermists		0:22:53	September 12, 2014
13	My Son Teaches Me a Game		0:4:35	September 15, 2014
14	Town		0:22:03	October 10, 2014
15	Jamie Cope in Black and White		0:36:49	October 24, 2014
16	Peace, Love and Occupation?		0:05:21	November 6, 2014
17	Raw Tape		0:18:32	November 7, 2014
18	Rock Lottery		0:03:25	November 11, 2014
19	Magic: The Gathering		0:11:08	December 3, 2014
20	Gold, Frankenstein and Myrrh		0:05:05	December 7, 2014
21	The Eyes of Sibiu		0:17:30	December 7, 2014
22	A Vermonter's Lament		0:05:00	December 12, 2014
23	Buy Nothing Day		0:06:31	December 18, 2014
24	Poopy Old Man		0:06:00	December 24, 2014
25	Truck		0:07:47	December 26, 2014
26	Big Job		0:59:37	December 26, 2014
27	Piano Practice		0:04:55	Jan 21, 2015
28	Leland		0:09:34	Jan 27, 2015
29	Police Log		0:02:37	Feb 2, 2015
30	Object of My Affection		0:15:21	Feb 15, 2015
31	More Poopy Old People		0:07:49	Feb 23, 2015
32	Police Log, March 2015		0:03:09	Mar 1, 2015
33	Here's a Song For You		0:04:23	Mar 2, 2015
34	Ed Epstein, A Life in Art		0:49:11	Mar 2, 2015
35	The Oligarchy of Participation		0:04:24	Mar 4, 2015
36	Eyes on the Sky		0:03:30	Mar 19, 2015
37	Shannon		0:09:33	Mar 24, 2015
38	Why Cooking Sucks		0:10:14	April 2, 2015
39	After the Forgetting		0:58:47	April 2, 2015
40	Michael Chorney, Music Inventor		0:50:50	April 2, 2015
41	A Night on Mount Shasta		0:25:24	April 9, 2015
42	Three Things I Learned at School		0:04:22	April 13, 2015
43	Private Investigator		0:12:12	May 6, 2015
44	Police Log, May 2015		0:03:35	May 22, 2015
45	Another Day Older		0:16:03	June 3, 2015
46	Cats on Boats		0:07:24	June 11, 2015
47	Three Weeks		0:31:28	June 24, 2015
48	Soccer Mom		0:24:14	July 5, 2015
49	Drag Out		0:13:53	July 11, 2015
50	Kendall Wild, A Toast		0:25:45	July 11, 2015
51	Homeless		0:27:09	July 18, 2015
52	Vermont Private Eye		0:12:11	July 26, 2015
53	A Long Day on the Road		0:15:38	July 31, 2015
54	Bison Selfies		0:10:24	Aug 7, 2015
55	Fred Webster		0:39:07	Aug 15, 2015
56	Love Life		0:23:31	Aug 24, 2015
57	Police Log Summer 2015		0:02:40	Sep 3, 2015
58	The Defense			Sept 10, 2015
59	Farewell Mark Johnson		0:31:12	Sept 11, 2015
60	Jessamyn West. Technology Lady.		0:39:57	Sept 25, 2015
61	Press 4		0:05:31	Oct 1, 2015
62	Pretend You're the Grownup		0:29:52	Oct 9, 2015
63	Schwag		0:08:20	Oct 15, 2015
64	The Green River Stories		0:25:43	Oct 22, 2015
65	The Schwag Raffle Draw!		0:06:15	Nov 6, 2015
66	In Case of Emergency		0:05:40	Nov 13, 2015
67	Our School		0:22:55	Nov 19, 2015
68	Hot Bird		0:03:49	Nov 25, 2015
69	A Conversation with M.T. Anderson		0:31:28	Dec 9, 2015
70	Seasonal Update		0:07:57	Dec 16, 2015
71	Day Before Christmas Police Log		0:03:23	Dec 24, 2015
72	Inside DCF		0:44:35	Jan 24, 2016
73	The Test		0:15:28	Feb 7, 2016
74	Berned in Reno		0:11:30	Feb 29, 2016
75	A Beer with Ben Hewitt		0:35:58	Mar 2, 2016
76	Muskrat Trapper		0:13:52	Mar 25, 2016
77	Jesse		0:23:40	April 8, 2016
78	Police Log, Stolen Pie Edition		0:03:12	April 21, 2016
79	Leland, the Almost Middle School Edition		0:11:49	April 26, 2016
80	Aunties		0:05:09	May 9, 2016
81	Six Parents. Six DCF Stories		0:38:22	May 20, 2016
82	Last Chapter		0:23:09	June 9, 2016
83	The Neighborhood		0:09:40	July 2, 2016
84	Peter Schumann, Advisor General		0:33:49	July 30, 2016
85	Police Log, Bunk Bed Dispute Edition		0:03:48	Aug 10, 2016
86	Driving around with Susan		0:32:43	Aug 22, 2016
87	Jubal. Tail End of the Old School.		0:15:27	Sept 9, 2016
88	When the Food Runs Out		0:31:15	Sept 24, 2016
89	Jim Rooney		0:25:49	Oct 18, 2016
90	The Special Olympics Are Awesome		0:17:59	Oct 25, 2016
91	Charlie Hunter Paints Outside		0:20:30	Nov 10, 2016
92	Hot Bird. Again.		0:03:27	Nov 24, 2016
93	Lentils Suck		0:11:29	Nov 30, 2016
94	Nicholas is Waiting		0:08:23	Dec 16, 2016
95	Seasonal Update from the Keens!		0:09:45	Dec 20, 2016
96	Benedict Arnold's Leg		0:29:15	Jan 3, 2017
97	Dunkin’ Donuts		0:16:49	Jan 31, 2017
98	Deep Stealth Mode		0:20:22	Feb 14, 2017
99	Your Neighbor		0:16:49	Feb 24, 2017
100	Judge Cashman		0:21:17	Mar 8, 2017
101	The Wildlife		0:21:55	Mar 22, 2017
102	Hunger is Boring		0:18:30	April 3, 2017
103	Robert Ford Last Ambassador		0:34:23	April 13, 2017
104	We Are Sending You Light		0:18:09	April 28, 2017
105	Leland is Almost Done Seventh Grade		0:12:15	May 11, 2017
106	An American Life			May 25, 2017
107	Crime and Punishment Under Trump		0:19:24	June 7, 2017
108	Police Log, Burning Lawn Chairs Edition		0:03:05	June 19, 2017
109	Sylvan Esso is a Good Band		0:31:00	June 29, 2017
110	Plain Life		0:17:44	July 8, 2017
111	Mind Windows		0:11:44	July 28, 2017
112	Waitress		0:46:49	Sept 1, 2017
113	Hill Farm		0:19:26	Sept 24, 2017
114	Catastrophe and Grace		0:22:30	Oct 16, 2017
115	The Museum of Everyday Life		0:16:13	Oct 28, 2017
116	Rowell		0:09:39	Nov 14, 2017
117	Scott's Nature		0:10:25	Dec 5, 2017
118	A Good Death		0:14:39	Dec 14, 2017
119	Seasons Greetings From Liz and Jerry!		0:10:43	Dec 21, 2017
120	Hitchhiker		0:34:35	Jan 10, 2018
121	Emergency		0:26:55	Jan 16, 2018
122	Learning the Trade		0:21:22	Feb 9, 2018
123	Son Lux		0:22:18	March 3, 2018
124	Problems, Episode 1: Grout and the Contra Dance		0:10:49	March 21, 2018
125	Driving Around With Susan. Again!		0:12:27	March 29, 2018
126	A Tribute to Greg Sharrow		0:10:10	April 4, 2018
127	Carl. A Different Breed of Cat		0:16:41	April 24, 2018
128	Shaggs’ Own Thing: The Story of the Wiggin Sisters		0:30:42	May 10, 2018
129	Police Log, Gancy's Cows Edition		0:03:27	May 24, 2018
130	Problems, Episode 2: Open Mic		0:08:16	June 7, 2018
131	Leland. It's a Porcupine!		0:11:20	June 28, 2018
132	Thomas Talks About Coming Out. Twice.		0:14:26	July 20, 2018
133	Amelia Drives Around		0:24:56	Aug 10, 2018
134	One of Those Teachers		0:19:39	Aug 23, 2018
135	Let's Pull the Damn Woman Card		0:22:33	Sept 11, 2018
136	Graffiti Photographer		0:11:37	Sept 28, 2018
