= Metope (producer) =

Metope (Michael Schwanen) is an electronic music producer who has produced many singles on Sender Records and Areal Records, of which he is the head. His style is associated with German minimal techno and microhouse. His music features quirky melodies mixed with music influences comparable to that of Ada, who Schwanen is credited with discovering. Metope, however, is known more for his "timbral richness" than for his melody or structure. Metope describes his music as "seeming to long for a transformation of their digital being into flesh, and that by bit reduction they attempt to imitate life".
