= Los Punsetes =

Spanish pop/rock band

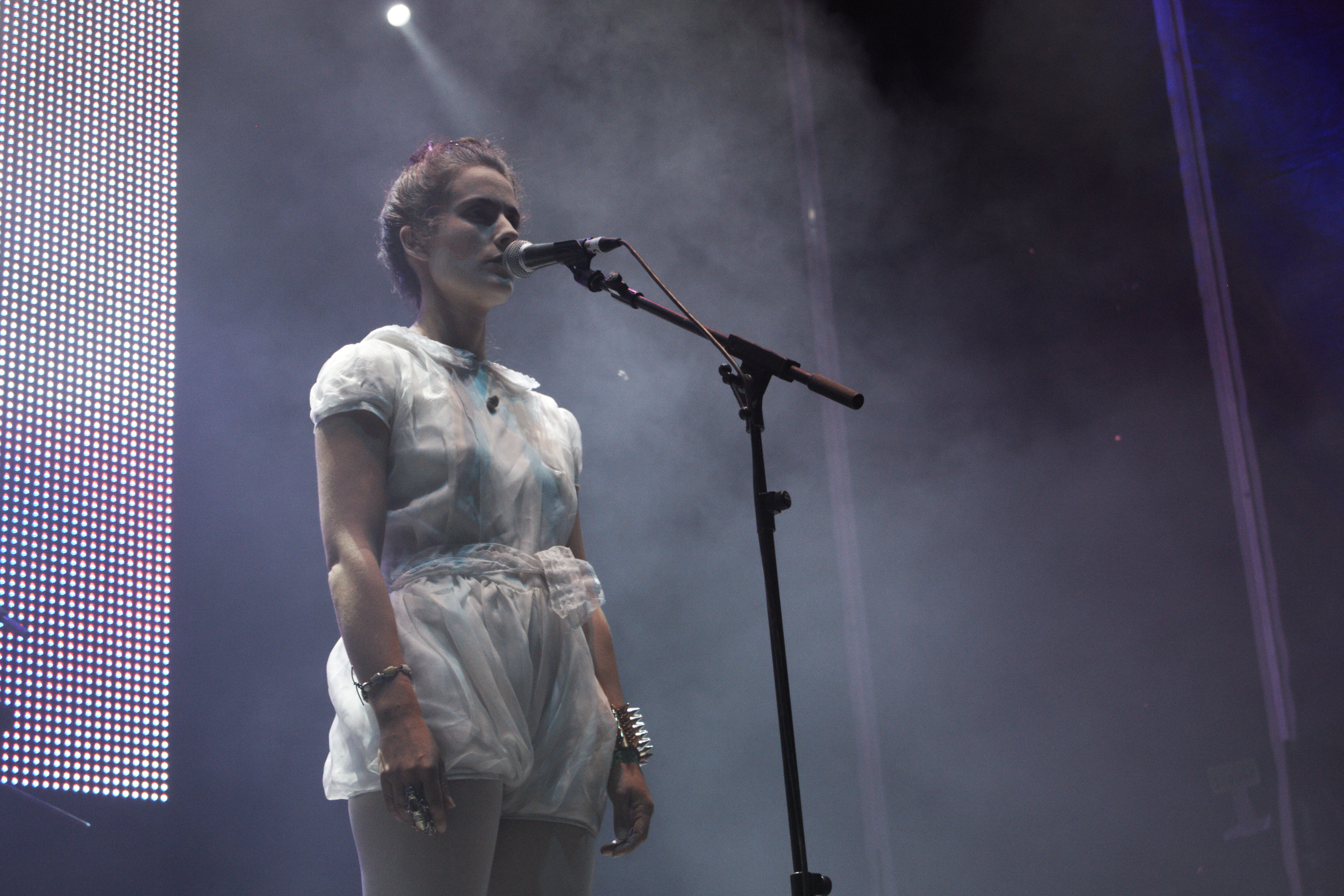
Los Punsetes in 2010.

Los Punsetes is a Spanish indie pop band formed in Madrid in 2004.

Named after the late politician, science communicator and television presenter Eduard Punset, its members consisting of university friends Manuel Sánchez (a.k.a. Anntona) (guitar), Ariadna Paniagua (vocals), Chema González (drums), Jorge García (guitar) and Gonzalo Prada (bass). Luis Fernández Sanz replaced Prada on bass in 2014.

They released their first LP in 2008, and are now regarded as among the most important and iconic figures in the Spanish indie scene.

The band is notable for its biting and acidic satirical lyrics. Tracks such as "Tus Amigos" and "Maricas" have anthemic status for their generation in Spain. Vocalist Ariadna is a fashion designer who make a new dress for every concert the band plays, and remains motionless throughout the band's "wall of sound" performance.

== Discography ==
- 2008: LP1 + Maquetas y rarezas (2004-2009) (Gramaciones Grabofónicas, Everlasting).
- 2010: LP2 (Everlasting).
- 2012: Una montaña es una montaña (Everlasting).
- 2014: LPIV.
- 2017: ¡Viva!.
- 2019: Aniquilación.
- 2021: España necesita conocer
- 2022: AFDTRQHOT (an acronym for Al Final Del Túnel Resulta Que Hay Otro Túnel)
