= Vincent Vincent and the Villains =

English rock band

- Origin: England
- Genres: Indie rock, rock n' roll, doo wop, rhythm and blues
- Years active: 2003 – 2008
- Label: EMI
- Past members: Vincent Vincent; Alex Cox; Tom Bailey; Will Church; Charlie Waller; Neill Kidgell
- Website: Official Site

Vincent Vincent and the Villains were an English rock band. They were signed to EMI.

== History ==
Vincent Vincent grew up in Hatch End, an area in the London Borough of Harrow. He later moved to East London's Bethnal Green and after leaving Art College decided to start a band. In 2003 he formed Vincent Vincent and the Villains and released a limited edition single on Smoking Gun Records in 2004 called "On My Own". With the band gaining local notoriety they were then talent spotted by Young And Lost Club, who signed the Villains and put out their second release, "Blue Boy". As well as Neill Kidgell on bass and Alex Cox on drums, the band at this time had two frontmen (Vincent himself and Charlie Waller) Waller left shortly after in 2005, to pursue his ambitions with his childhood band, The Rumble Strips. The final months for the original lineup of the Villains were described as "stifling, unpleasant and impossible" and inspired the song "Johnny Two Bands" which would be the band's first major release, taking the melody from a previous song "Making Raindrops". Vincent Vincent found a new bassist and guitarist in Will Church and Tom Bailey (who were friends from college, and with whom Vincent worked in the Ten Bells pub), and the third single - "I'm Alive" - was released on Young and Lost Club Records in April 2006. This secured a record deal with EMI, with "Johnny Two Bands" being chosen as the debut single. This was performed on Top of the Pops in October 2006. The band re-released "On My Own" the following year in October 2007. The next single "Pretty Girl" was released on 25 February 2008 on CD/7"/digital download. The album Gospel Bombs was released on 10 March 2008. A third single off the album was planned for May 2008, but due to ongoing problems at EMI Records these plans were shelved.

After being dropped by EMI the band cancelled most of their summer dates, but appeared at Benicassim Festival 2008. They played their final gig together at 93 Feet East, London on 13 September 2008.

== Members ==
- Vincent Vincent - Vocals & Guitar
- Alex Cox - Drums
- Tom Bailey - Lead guitar
- Will Church - Bass

The Villains evolved from The Double Card Bastards, The collaboration included Vincent Vincent, Neill Kidgell, Charlie Waller and William Shannon (who made the instruments out of cardboard, string and a baked bean tin). Will Church worked with Vincent at this time in The Ten Bells pub in East London, which was frequented by Tom Bailey (who wrote songs in a band with Church), and when Charlie Waller and Neill Kidgell left, the two became Villains.

== Releases ==
=== Albums ===
- Gospel Bombs (2008)

=== Singles ===
Date of release	Title	B-sides	Label	UK Singles Chart	Album
April 2004	"On My Own" (Limited Edition 7-inch)	"B-side baby"	Smoking Gun Records	N/A	N/A
April 2005	"Blue Boy/The Boy Who Killed Time" (Limited Double A-Side 7-inch)	N/A	Young and Lost Club YALC-0001	N/A	N/A
April 2006	"I'm Alive" (Limited 7-inch)	"There Is A Cloud"	Young and Lost Club YALC-0005	N/A	N/A
October 2006	"Johnny Two Bands"	"Seven Inch Record"	EMI EMVVV7 001	91	N/A
October 2007	"On My Own"	"Love and Pain" and "Bad Boy"	EMI EM 735	N/A	Gospel Bombs
25 February 2008	"Pretty Girl"	"Radio City" and "Can't Judge A Book By The Cover"	EMI CDEM740	N/A	Gospel Bombs
