= The Rumble Strips =

English band

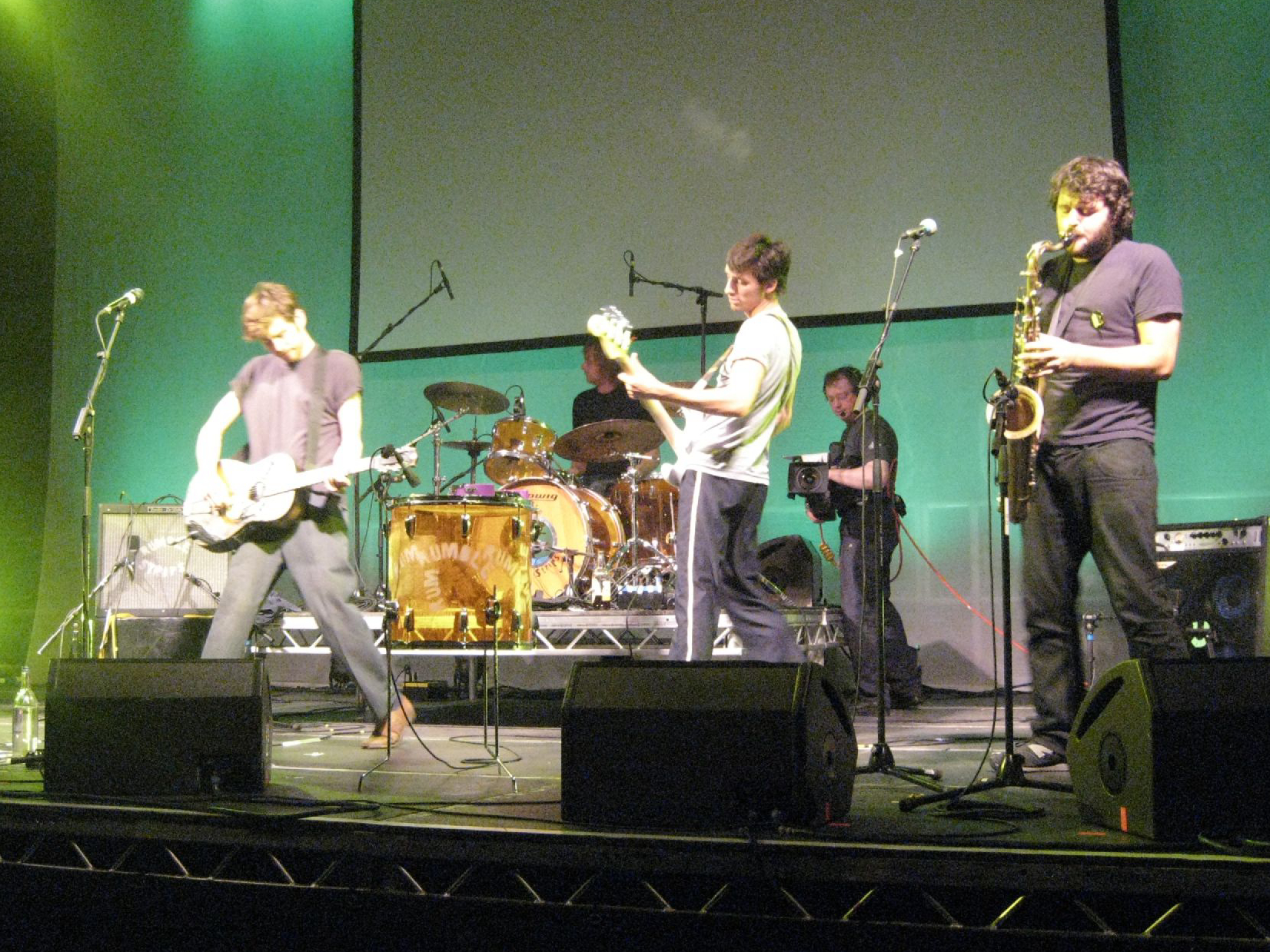
- The Rumble Strips performing in 2007

Background information
- Origin: Tavistock, Devon, England
- Genres: Indie pop, soul
- Years active: 2004–2010, 2015–present
- Labels: Fallout (Universal Island); Transgressive
- Members: Charlie Waller; Henry Clark; Tom Gorbutt; Matthew Wheeler; Sam Mansbridge

The Rumble Strips are an English band from Tavistock, Devon. The 4-piece line-up of Charlie Waller, Henry Clark, Tom Gorbutt & Matthew Wheeler was present from the first recordings until late 2006 when Sam Mansbridge joined to fill out the sound developed during the recording of 'Girls & Weather'. The band were signed to Fallout Records, a subsidiary of Universal Island Records.

== History ==
=== Formation ===
Having known each other since childhood, there is no precise conception date for the band. Lead singer Charlie Waller was involved in music from an early age, initial inspirations included Lou Reed's Transformer and bands such as Adam and the Ants. He moved to London for art college and played with his band from Devon, the Action Heroes. The Action Heroes included Matthew Wheeler, drums, Sam Mansbridge, Guitar & Harry Dwyer on keyboards. (Harry would later go on to direct most of the Rumble Strips' videos). The Action Heroes disbanded in 2002. At this point Waller began writing and playing again with former Tavistock friends Tom Gorbutt, and Henry Clark. These three maintained various residencies at the then local Wandsworth pubs until Matthew Wheeler, rejoined them in 2004. Also during this time, Charlie was one of two frontmen in Vincent Vincent and the Villains with flatmate and fellow singer/songwriter Vincent Vincent. The strain of playing in two bands eventually led to Waller quitting both groups before being coaxed back to the Rumble Strips. Vincent Vincent wrote the song "Johnny Two Bands" about Waller's departure. Old friend and former bandmate of all the Rumbles (from the Mother Eating Blackberries and Action Heroes) Sam Mansbridge, returning from overseas, spent some time on the road with the band after their return from recording 'Girls & Weather' in LA with Tony Hoffer. The band had been used to Tom Gorbutt alternating between playing the Bass or Sax live however the need for a complete sound with bass guitar and a bass backing vocal led to the natural inclusion of Mansbridge for the live shows. Not taking away from Tom's bass playing Sam introduced the Rumble Drum that became such a feature of the band's live act.

The band took their name from rumble strips, which are a series of small, continuous lines of bumps alongside a road designed to help prevent inattentive drivers straying off the road.

=== 2005–2007 ===
Always gigging, The Rumble Strips found themselves at the front of the then exploding live music scene. Often performing in the early clubs and parties of East London. It was at such a gig that the independent record label Transgressive Records – who have produced singles for The Young Knives and Regina Spektor – noticed the band, eventually offering to release the band's first single. It was over this period that Waller had left the band, but decided to not pass up this opportunity of a first release and so together they released "Motorcycle" on 12 December 2005. Waller said at this time "It was like, What have I to lose? – Since I was young I'd always been in bands until a few months ago and now i'm just working on a building site.". The band moved further into the public eye with a number of key support dates for Dirty Pretty Things and fellow Transgressive artists The Young Knives in early 2006, and then the release of their second single, "Hate Me (You Do)" on 5 June. A further tour supporting The Zutons, and the release of the band's first EP, Cardboard Coloured Dreams, followed this in November 2006.

The new year brought the Rumble Strips their first move into the charts, with their release of "Alarm Clock" on 19 March 2007 reaching No. 41 in the UK Singles Chart. It was in this year, that they were voted number 10 in BBC's "Sounds of 2007". The band were asked by NME to play their biggest headline tour to date, as headliners of the 2007 Topman NME New Music Tour throughout May 2007.The tour saw them play a number of venues around the country with other new bands Pull Tiger Tail, Blood Red Shoes and The Little Ones. The band released a live EP recorded whilst on the tour containing the tracks "Oh Creole", "Alarm Clock", "My Oh My" and previously unreleased track, "London". The band re-released "Motorcycle" on 4 June 2007. The single failed to reach the previous heights of "Alarm Clock", charting slightly lower at No. 46. Two 7-inch vinyls were also released of the track, containing b-side "My Oh My". A misprint was made on some of these vinyls where 1000 copies were distributed labelling the B-side on the opposite side to the one listed. These are not being considered collector's items, especially by the band themselves.

Following the release of "Motorcycle", the band stated that they had already decided on their next single, "Girls and Boys in Love", which was released on 3 September 2007 and was the official song of the film Run Fatboy Run, starring Simon Pegg and directed by David Schwimmer, and itself released on 10 September 2007. Their debut album, Girls And Weather, was released on 17 September, peaking at No. 70 in the UK album charts, with "Girls and Boys in Love", reaching No. 64 in the UK Singles Chart.

=== 2007–2010 ===
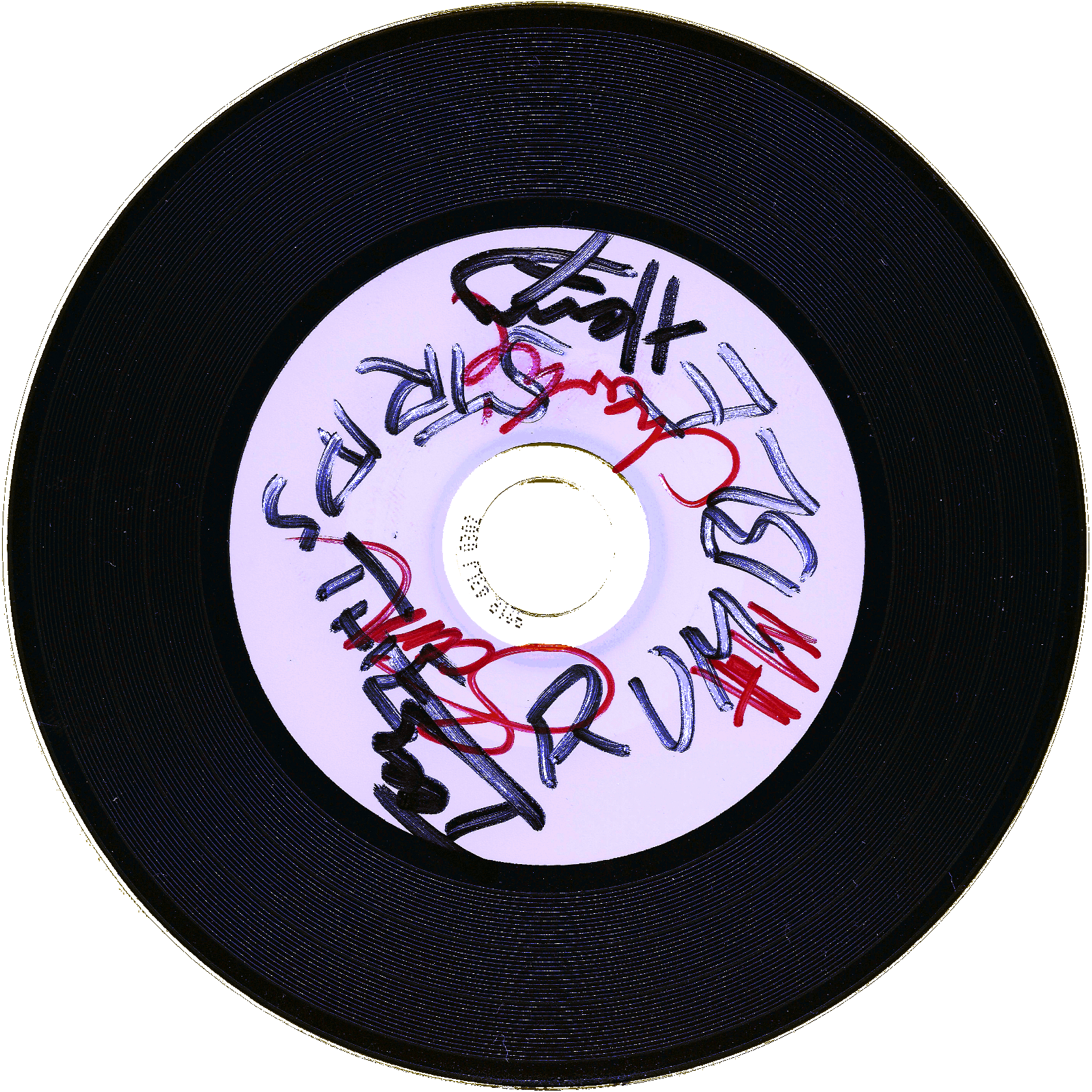
A Rumble Strips CD with the signatures of all band members

The Rumble Strips were asked by Island Records to remix the Amy Winehouse single "Back to Black", and this was released in 2007 on limited-edition white vinyl. The band also decided to re-record the song in their own style. This drew the attention of producer Mark Ronson and led to Waller being asked to sing lead vocals on "Back to Black" at The Electric Proms in 2007. In late 2008, with Sam Mansbridge now a full member, the band began working with Ronson on their second record at London rehearsal space The Joint. Recorded off the back of their first US tour the band lay down the bulk of the tracks at Avatar Studios, New York, leaving vocals to be completed in London, England whilst orchestration was composed and overseen by Owen Pallett (Final Fantasy, Arcade Fire) and completed in Prague. The album was released in July 2009 under the name Welcome to the Walk Alone. As part of their First Listen series of features, The-Fly.co.uk ran a track-by-track synopsis of Welcome to the Walk Alone on their site on 26 May. Whilst stating that "Ronson's kitchen sink production is evident after little more than a minute," they said that the sound of the record is "lush", highlighting "Dem Girls", "Sweet Heart Hooligan" and "Daniel" as the album's highlights. The tour for the album concluded in 2010, after which the band removed themselves from the scene for an indefinite period.

=== 2015–present ===
During the intervening five years, contact had always been close within the band despite much change. Geographically, all the members had been living around the world. Wheeler was in Berlin, Gorbutt went back to Devon, Clark was settled in Australia, and Waller was in Copenhagen, via Cuba. Since 2010 Waller and Clark had continued to write and perform in various projects, but as of late 2014-15 they began passing new ideas to each other. The writing was developed with each member's contributions until the summer of 2015, when the five members were able to be in the same place. The band decided to record what they could in those five days together. These recordings became known as 'The Lightship recordings' after the name of the studio, Lightship 95, a floating light-house moored at Trinity Buoy Wharf, East London. The recordings are being released in their entirety during 2016 with a limited edition physical release planned.

== Discography ==
=== Albums ===
- Girls and Weather (2007) 70# UK
- Welcome to the Walk Alone (2009) 76# UK
- The Lightship Recordings - part 1 (2016) digital release only
- The Lightship Recordings - part 2 (2016) digital release only
- The Lightship Recordings - part 3 (2016) digital release only

=== Singles ===
Year	Title	Chart positions	Certifications	Album
Year	Title	UK	Certifications	Album
2005	"Motorcycle / No Soul"	–		Girls and Weather
2006	"Hate Me (You Do)"	–		Girls and Weather
2007	"Alarm Clock"	41		Girls and Weather
2007	"Motorcycle"	46		Girls and Weather
2007	"Girls and Boys in Love"	64	BPI: Silver	Girls and Weather
2007	"Time"	–		Girls and Weather
2009	"London"	–		Welcome to the Walk Alone
2009	"Not The Only Person"	151		Welcome to the Walk Alone

=== EPs ===
Date of Release	Title	Tracks	Label
20 November 2006	Cardboard Coloured Dreams (CD/Poster 12-inch/8-inch )	1. "Oh Creole"; 2. "Born Bored"; 3. "High Street Heaven"; 4. "Running Away"	Fallout/Island Records

=== Contributions ===
- NME Presents The Best New Bands – contains "Motorcycle" (Issued with NME on 9 September 2006)
- NME Presents The Essential Bands – Festival Edition – contains "Alarm Clock" (Released 11 June 2007)
- Run Fatboy Run: Original Soundtrack – contains "Girls and Boys in Love" (Released 10 September 2007)
- Amy Winehouse "Back to Black" remix
- The song 'Sad City' was used in the Kurt Cobain documentary 'Too Young to Die'
- The songs "Girls and Boys in Love" and "Alarm Clock" have been used in the UK TV sitcom The Inbetweeners.
- Angus, Thongs and Perfect Snogging: Music From The Motion Picture – Contains "Girls and Boys in Love"
- 2010 Macy's denim jeans sale commercial uses the "Girls and Boys in Love" tune.
- In October 2010, Baileys used the song "Girls and Boys in Love" for their commercial.
- "Back Bone" featured in Remedy's 2010 video game Alan Wake as one of the songs found on the playable radios scattered throughout the game.
