= Astrud (band) =

Spanish pop-rock group

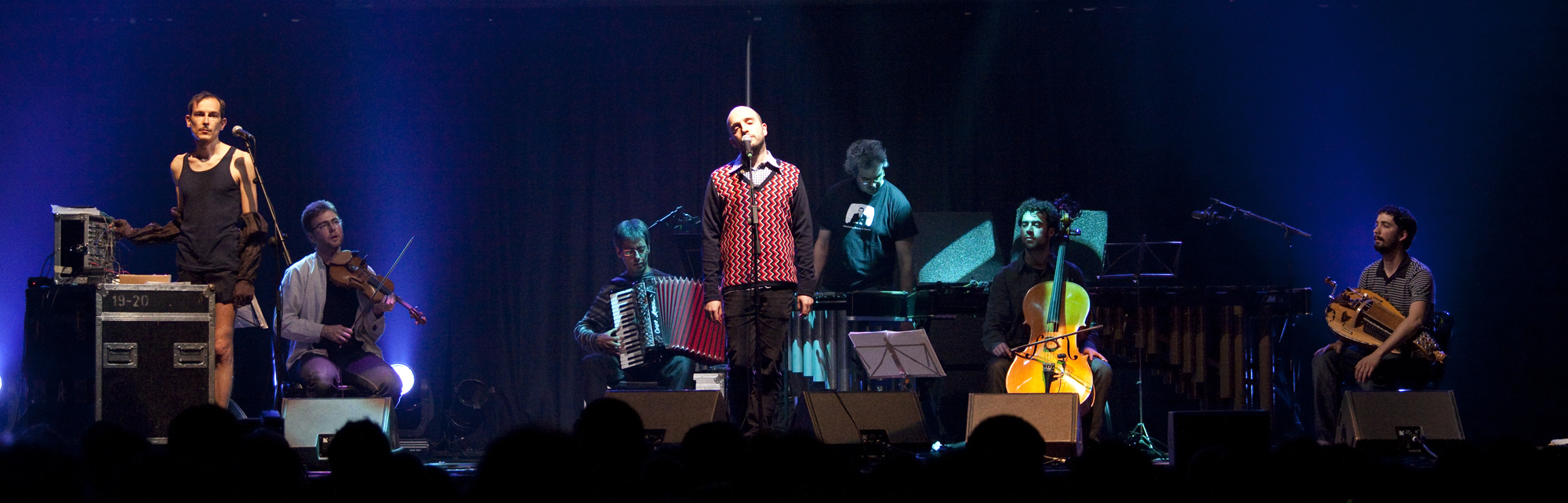
Astrud in concert (2010).

Astrud was a Spanish pop-rock group from the city of Barcelona which formed in the second half of the 1990s. Composed of Manolo Martínez and Genís Segarra (also in electronic band Hidrogenesse), they met with a degree of critical and commercial success within the Spanish indie music scene. In 2006 they released a collection of rarities and B-sides called Algo cambió (Something Changed), which includes a Spanish-language cover version of the Pulp song of the same name.

== Discography ==
=== Albums ===
- Mi Fracaso Personal 1999
- Gran fuerza 2001
- Performance 2004
- Algo cambió (Sinammon Records, 2006)
- Tú no existes 2007

=== CD singles ===
- Esto debería acabarse aquí 1999
- Mentalismo 2001
- La boda 2002
- Mírame a los ojos 2002

=== EPs ===
- Superman 1998
- Cambio de idea 2000
- Todo nos parece una mierda 2004

=== Other ===
- Un mystique determinado 2004
