= Venezia (song) =

Single by Hombres G

from the album Hombres G
- A-side: "Venezia"
- B-side: "Hace Un Año"
- Released: March 11, 1985
- Genre: Dance-Rock, pop rock, opera
- Label: Twins
- Songwriter(s): David Summers
- Producer(s): Paco Trinidad

Hombres G singles chronology
"Devuélveme a mi chica" (1985)	"Venezia" (1985)	"Dejad que las niñas se acerquen a mí" (1985)

"Venezia" (Venice) is a song by the Spanish pop rock band, Hombres G. It was released as a single from their debut album, Hombres G (1985).

The song was a hit in the summer of 1985, during which it reached number one on the Spanish singles chart. It became their second number one single in Spain, following the success of "Devuélveme a mi chica".

The song features an introductory a cappella by Javier Molina, the band's drummer. An earlier version of the song which appears on Hombres G's 1983 single "Milagro en el Congo / Venezia" does not include this introductory a cappella.

== Track listing ==
Venezia

1. "Venezia" - 4:33
2. "Hace Un Año" - 4:02

== Chart history ==
Chart	Provider(s)	Peak position
Spanish Singles Chart	Radio Luz (RR) Alcazar de S.Juan	1

== Certifications ==
Region	Certification	Certified units/sales
Spain (PROMUSICAE)	Platinum	60,000^{‡}
^{‡} Sales+streaming figures based on certification alone.

== Personnel ==
Hombres G

- David Summers - lead vocals, bass
- Rafa Gutiérrez - guitar
- Daniel Mezquita - guitar
- Javier Molina - drums, a capella vocals
