= Marta tiene un marcapasos / La cagaste, Burt Lancaster =

Single by Hombres G
- A-side: "Marta tiene un marcapasos"
- B-side: "La cagaste, Burt Lancaster"
- Released: 1983
- Recorded: 1983
- Genre: Pop rock Punk
- Length: 5:25
- Label: Lollipop
- Producer(s): Fernando Cabello

Hombres G singles chronology
"Milagro en el Congo / Venezia" (1983)	"Marta tiene un marcapasos / La cagaste, Burt Lancaster" (1983)	"Devuélveme a mi chica" (1985)

"Marta tiene un marcapasos / La cagaste, Burt Lancaster" is the second single released by Spanish rock band Hombres G. The title song is an early version of the single from their album, La cagaste... Burt Lancaster. It was released at the same time as "Milagro en el Congo / Venezia" and through their first label, Lollipop.

The Lollipop label was undergoing difficult financial circumstances at the end of 1983 and new recordings were delayed during 1984, when the group decided to split after a last performance in October. At this performance, they met with Paco Martin, owner of Twins Records, and signed with the new record label.

"Marta tiene un marcapasos" was re-recorded and a completely new version included on their second album, La cagaste... Burt Lancaster, while only a 1986 demo of "La cagaste, Burt Lancaster" has been subsequently released on Peligrosamente Juntos.

== Track listing ==
Marta tiene un marcapasos / La cagaste, Burt Lancaster

1. "Marta tiene un marcapasos" - 1:56
2. "La cagaste, Burt Lancaster" - 3:29

== Personnel ==
Hombres G

- David Summers - lead vocals, bass
- Rafa Gutierrez - guitar, vocals
- Javier Molina - drums, vocals
- Danny Hardy - guitar, piano, vocals
