= David Summers =

David Summers may refer to:

- David Summers Rodríguez (born 1964), Spanish musician and frontman of Hombres G
  - David Summers (album), self-titled album by David Summers
- David Summers (art historian), American art historian
- David Summers (diplomat), Canadian High Commissioner to Malaysia
- Dave Summers, fictional character on the Australian soap opera Neighbours
