= En la playa =

2011 live album by Hombres G

Live album by Hombres G
- Released: November 29, 2011
- Recorded: PKO Estudios, Noisy House, Madrid
- Genre: Rock, pop rock
- Length: 38:10
- Label: Sony

Hombres G chronology
Desayuno continental (2010)	En la playa (2011)

Singles from En la playa
- 1. "Lo noto (con Miguel Bosé)" Released: November 15, 2011

En la playa

Video by Hombres G
- Released: November 29, 2011
- Recorded: El Varadero de Zahara, Cádiz
- Genre: Rock, pop rock
- Label: Sony
- Director: Nahuel Lerena
- Producer: Fernando Montesinos

En la playa is a live acoustic CD/DVD by the Spanish pop rock band Hombres G, released on November 29, 2011. It consists of a film and album and features collaborations with Dani Martín, Pereza, Miguel Bosé, Ana Torroja, Álvaro Urquijo, Albert Hammond, and Ha*Ash. It includes live renditions of songs previously released by the group and features a new track called "Si seguimos así".

== Background ==
According to David Summers, En la playa was based on the idea of making a film about a new experience: the creative companionship between artists in a beautiful setting. The band wanted to make a live, acoustic, and refreshing record of a selection songs that meant something to Hombres G or to the guest artists. With those intentions, Hombres G and their invited guests made their way towards Zahara de los Atunes, a small and quiet village located on Costa de la Luz in Andalusia, Spain.

In the album's press release, Summers emphasized that En la playa was not meant to be an album of duets or greatest hits. He also noted that the natural sounds found on the DVD — those of the wind, the ocean, and the environment — could only go hand in hand with the scenic imagery of the beach. Therefore, for the CD version, Hombres G headed to a studio in Madrid and added chords, keyboards, and songs.

== Track listings ==
DVD

No.	Title	collaborating artist(s)	Length
1.	"Venezia"
2.	"Un par de palabras"	Álvaro Urquijo
3.	"Te vi"	David Summers with Albert Hammond
4.	"Si no te tengo a ti"	Ana Torroja
5.	"Devuélveme a mi chica"	Ana Torroja, Ha*Ash, and Albert Hammond
6.	"Marta tiene un marcapasos"	Ana Torroja, Ha*Ash, and Albert Hammond
7.	"Voy a pasármelo bien"	Pereza
8.	"Temblando"	Ha*Ash
9.	"Te necesito"	Dani Martín
10.	"La primavera"	Dani Martín
11.	"En la playa"	Dani Martín

CD

No.	Title	collaborating artist	Length
1.	"Voy a pasármelo bien"	Pereza	4:28
2.	"Lo noto"	Miguel Bosé	4:14
3.	"Si no te tengo a ti"	Ana Torroja	4:14
4.	"Te vi"	Albert Hammond	3:45
5.	"Temblando"	Ha*Ash	3:23
6.	"Te necesito"	Dani Martín	3:30
7.	"Un par de palabras"	Álvaro Urquijo	3:31
8.	"Te quiero"		3:42
9.	"Huellas en la bajamar"		3:07
10.	"Si seguimos así"		4:16
Total length:			38:10
