= Devuélveme a mi chica =

Single by Hombres G

from the album Hombres G
- Language: Spanish
- English title: "Give me back my girl"
- B-side: "Nassau"
- Released: 1986
- Recorded: 1985
- Genre: Dance-rock, pop rock
- Label: Twins
- Songwriter: David Summers
- Producer: Paco Trinidad

Hombres G singles chronology
"Marta tiene un marcapasos / La cagaste, Burt Lancaster" (1983)	"Devuélveme a mi chica" (1986)	"Venezia" (1985)

"Devuélveme a mi chica" the debut single by Spanish pop rock band Hombres G. It originally appeared on their eponymous debut studio album (1985).

The song was released as a single and an international success. It is one of the group's most popular songs and remains significant in the genres of rock en español and 1980s Spanish music, being ranked among VH1's "Las 100 + Grandiosas Canciones En Español".

The song is popularly known as "Sufre, mamón", due to the chorus catchphrase.

Over time, the song has become a Spanish 80's classic, keeping its popularity through the years in countries such as Mexico, where the song has been in the streaming charts for five years, making it the most successful song from the group and the most streamed song by a Spanish band in the country. It has also charted in Peru, Colombia, Bolivia and Ecuador, among others.

The song went viral in early 2022 after becoming massively successful on TikTok in Spain and Latin America.

== Lyrical content ==
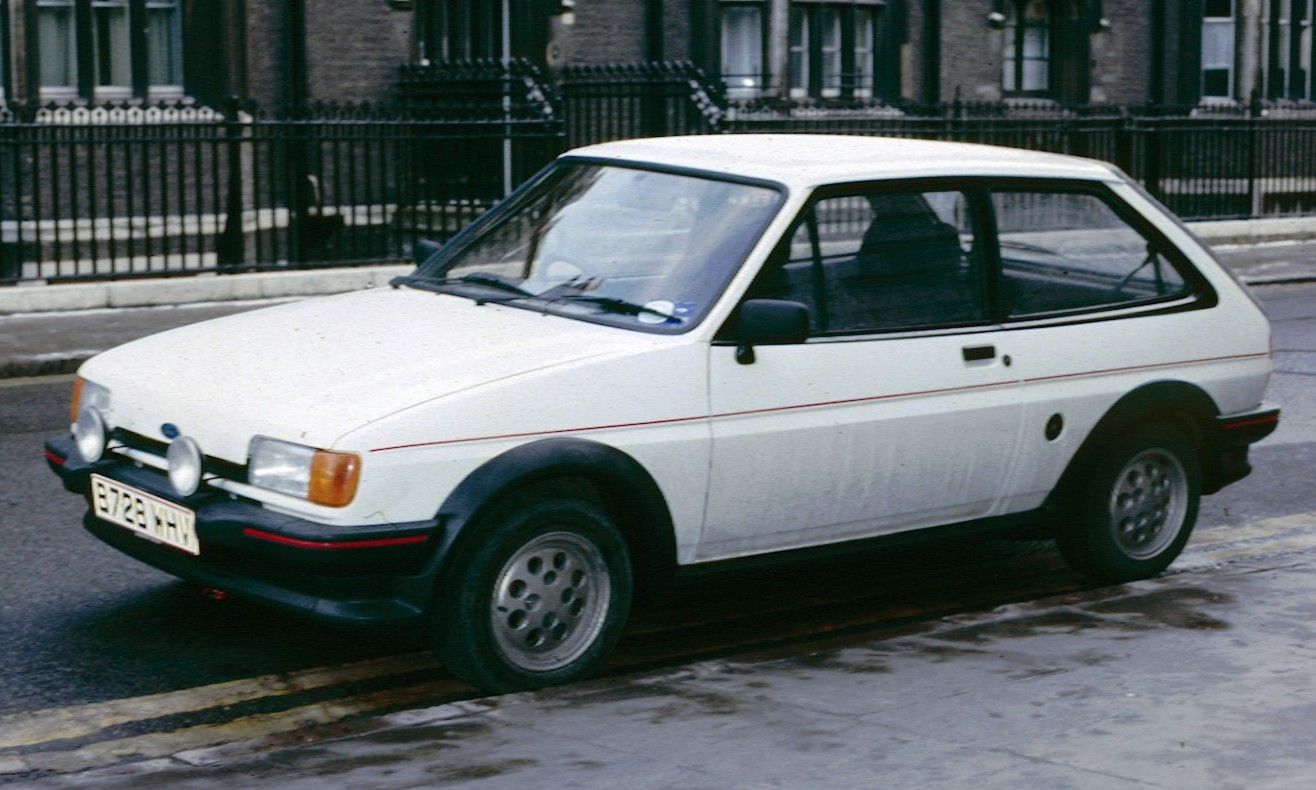
A 1984 model of a white Ford Fiesta, which is mentioned in the song.

The song's narrator describes the dread he feels as he witnesses the romantic encounter between the girl he likes and another boy. The boy travels in a white Ford Fiesta and wears a yellow jersey; the narrator describes him as preppy and a sissy ("pijo" and "marica" in Spanish, respectively). The narrator demands that the boy return his "girl" or that otherwise he will fall victim to "polvos picapica" (Note: In Spanish, polvos picapica are a variety of leaves and powders which cause a large amount of itching upon coming in contact with the skin.)

The narrator proceeds to burn the boy's jersey. To his dismay, the boy buys five or six more. Consequently, the narrator makes plans to destroy the boy's car. He announces that the boy will die and that the girl will return to him.

The lyrics of the song have been described as defying the cliché model of masculinity. Instead of chronicling a violent and physical encounter, the narrator uses an unexpected and mischievous method to take revenge: itchy powders.

== Release ==
The song was originally released as a single in Spain, in 1985. When it was released internationally, it faced scrutiny because of its lyrics, and was partially censored in Mexico. The lyrics include the word "mamón" (literally "sucker") which in Mexico is quite offensive (much stronger than "jerk"). Therefore, an edited version for the radio was released. The phrasing was then changed to "sufre, sufre".

== Track listing ==
Devuélveme a mi chica

No.	Title	Length
1.	"Devuélveme a mi Chica"	3:16
2.	"Nassau"	4:41

== Chart positions ==
Positions received for «Devuélveme a mi chica» in 1985
Country	List	Peak position	Ref.
Spain	Los40 España	1	

=== Year-end charts ===
Chart (2023)	Position
Perú Pop (Monitor Latino)	69

== Certifications ==
Region	Certification	Certified units/sales
Spain (Promusicae)	3× Platinum	180,000^{‡}
^{‡} Sales+streaming figures based on certification alone.

== Personnel ==
Hombres G

- David Summers - lead vocals, bass
- Rafa Gutierrez - guitar
- Daniel Mezquita - guitar
- Javier Molina - drums
