= Marta tiene un marcapasos =

Single by Hombres G

from the album La cagaste... Burt Lancaster
- A-side: "Marta tiene un marcapasos"
- B-side: "Tomasa me persigue"
- Released: 1986
- Genre: Dance-punk
- Label: Producciones Twins
- Songwriter(s): David Summers
- Producer(s): Paco Trinidad

Hombres G singles chronology
"Dejad que las niñas se acerquen a mí" (1985)	"Marta tiene un marcapasos" (1986)	"El ataque de las chicas cocodrilo" (1986)

"Marta tiene un marcapasos" (Spanish for Marta has a pacemaker) is the first single released by the Spanish rock band Hombres G for their sophomore studio album La cagaste... Burt Lancaster released through the music label Producciones Twins in 1986.

The song reached the top position on the Spanish singles chart in June 1986.

This was the second version released of the song, the first appearing on the 1983 single "Marta tiene un marcapasos / La cagaste, Burt Lancaster". The single's b-side, "Tomasa me persigue" has not been included on any subsequent release.

== Track listing ==
Marta tiene un marcapasos

1. Marta tiene un marcapasos - 2:14
2. Tomasa me persigue - 3:42

== Chart history ==
Chart	Provider(s)	Peak position
Spanish Singles Chart	Radio Luz (RR) Alcazar de S.Juan	1

== Personnel ==
Hombres G

- David Summers - lead vocals, bass
- Rafa Gutierrez - guitar
- Daniel Mezquita - guitar
- Javier Molina - drums
