= Voy a pasármelo bien =

Voy a pasármelo bien may refer to:

- Voy a pasármelo bien (album), a 1989 album by Hombres G
- Voy a pasármelo bien (film), a 2022 Spanish-Mexican musical comedy film
