= Milagro en el Congo / Venezia =

Single by Hombres G
- A-side: "Milagro en el Congo"
- B-side: "Venezia"
- Released: 1983
- Recorded: April – May 1983 at Estudios TRAK
- Genre: New wave, pop rock, punk rock
- Length: 6:06
- Label: Lollipop
- Songwriter(s): David Summers
- Producer(s): Fernando Cabello

Hombres G singles chronology
"Milagro en el Congo / Venezia" (1983)	"Marta tiene un marcapasos / La cagaste, Burt Lancaster" (1983)

Alternative cover
- Alternate cover

"Milagro en el Congo / Venezia" is a single by the Spanish pop rock band Hombres G. It is one of their very first singles, released through the label, Lollipop, in 1983.

The music on the single has been described as spontaneous and as being particularly influenced by the punk genre. This was one of only two singles Hombres G released through Lollipop. Difficult financial circumstances forced the label to delay new releases from the band. In 1984, the group accepted an offer from the record label, Twins. The song "Venezia" was re-recorded and an updated version included on their debut album, Hombres G.

In 2011, singer Miguel Bosé was quoted as saying, "La primera canción suya que escuché fue Milagro en el Congo. Me encantaron" (English: "The first song I heard by them was Milagro en el Congo. I really liked them.")

== Track listing ==
Milagro en el Congo / Venezia

1. "Milagro en el Congo" - 2:50
2. "Venezia" - 3:16

== Personnel ==
Hombres G

- David Summers - lead vocals, bass
- Rafa Gutierrez - guitar, vocals
- Javier Molina - drums, vocals
- Danny Hardy - guitar, piano, vocals

Additional Musicians

- Lidia Iovane and Eva Dalda - choirs
- Romy - percussion
- Fernando Cabello - tenor sax
