= Un Poco Más =

Un Poco Más may refer to:

== Music ==
=== Albums ===
- Un Poco Más (MDO album)
- Un Poco Más, by Guadalupe Pineda, 1985
- Un Poco Más, album by Los Palominos, 2002

=== Songs ===
- "Un Poco Más", song written by Álvaro Carrillo
- "Un Poco Más", song by Hombres from Todo esto es muy extraño
- "Un Poco Más", song by band Jumbo
- "Un Poco Más", song by Luis Miguel from Luis Miguel: 20 Años
- "Un Poco Más", song by Verónica Castro from Resurrección
