= Desayuno continental =

Studio album by Hombres G
- Released: November 16, 2010
- Recorded: Red Led & Cata
- Genre: Rock, pop rock
- Length: 39:17
- Producer: Carlos Jean

Hombres G chronology
10 (2007)	Desayuno continental (2010)	En la playa (2011)

Singles from Desayuno Continental
- 1. "El secreto de vivir" Released: October 17, 2010

Desayuno continental is the eleventh studio album by Spanish pop rock band Hombres G, released on November 16, 2010.

== Background ==
A video recording of "Separados" was released in October 2009 on HombresG.tv. Three songs, "Separados", "Desayuno continental", and "No puedo soportar perderte", then made their live debut during a performance at their Pop'n'Roll bar in Madrid.

The title of the album, Desayuno Continental, was announced in September 2010 and music website Popes80 revealed that the album was recorded at several locations; at Red Led and Cata and the home studios of David Summers and producer Carlos Jean.

Desayuno continental was released independently and in a February 2011 interview with Rolling Stone magazine, Hombres G expressed intentions of it being their last album.

== Promotion ==
To promote the release of the album, Hombres G performed at various cities in Spain: Madrid (November 9, 2010 at La Riviera), Barcelona (November 11, 2010), Valencia (November 13, 2010), Benidorm (November 14, 2010).

== Reception ==
Professional ratings
Review scores
Source	Rating
Allmusic	3/5 stars

In his review of the album, Mariano Prunes of Allmusic said:

"The new songs are not bad, but they are undeniably generic, whereas -- for better or for worse and precisely because of their kitsch attitude and wacky lyrics -- Hombres G used to be unique... Desayuno Continental is an eminently professional Spanish pop record that will certainly please fans of the band or of the genre. Casual listeners, on the other hand, will be hard-pressed to find any telling differences between the new Hombres G and any number of Spanish (or even Mexican) pop bands such as Taxi, Amaral, and El Canto del Loco, all bands that can be rightfully considered to be Hombres G descendants..."

However, Prunes praised "Separados" as an exception and "a truly beautiful song that marries the best lyric and melody of the album with an inspired guest vocal by Bebe, whose weary, longing voice brings a much welcome variety to this continental breakfast table."

== Track listing ==
No.	Title	Length
1.	"Soy como tú"	3:21
2.	"Vete de mí"	4:33
3.	"El secreto de vivir"	3:50
4.	"Separados (con Bebe)"	4:09
5.	"Desayuno continental"	3:08
6.	"No puedo soportar perderte"	5:05
7.	"Morir entre semana"	3:28
8.	"Sistema solar"	4:14
9.	"Aprendiendo a volar"	3:15
10.	"Déjame quedarme"	4:14
