= Álvaro Urquijo =

Spanish guitarist and singer-songwriter (born 1962)

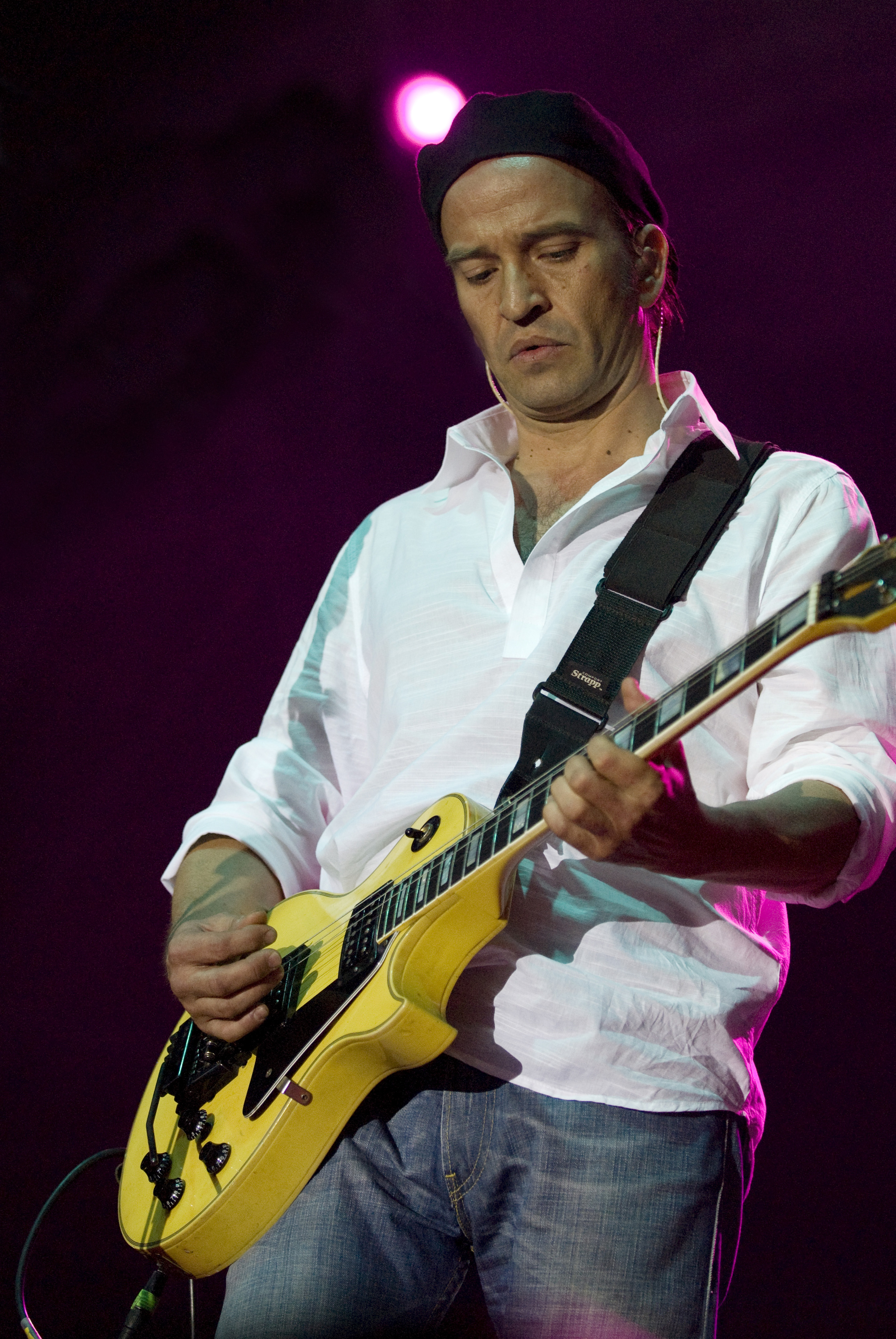
- Álvaro Urquijo performing in 2007.

Background information
- Born: 22 June 1962 (age 63); Madrid, Spain
- Genres: Pop rock
- Occupations: Musician, composer, guitarist, singer
- Years active: 1980–present
- Labels: Polydor, Producciones Twins, Dro
- Member of: Los Secretos

Álvaro Urquijo (born 22 June 1962) is a Spanish guitarist and singer-songwriter who is known as one of the founding members of the pop rock group, Los Secretos.

He founded Los Secretos with his brothers Javier and Enrique Urquijo in 1980.

== Discography ==
=== With Los Secretos ===
- Tos (1978)
- Los Secretos EP (1980)
- Los Secretos (1981)
- Todo siguel igual (1982)
- Algo más (1983)
- Lo mejor (1985)
- El primer cruce (1986)
- Continuará (1987)
- Directo (1988)
- La calle del olvido (1990)
- Adiós tristeza (1991)
- Cambio de planes (1993)
- Ojos de gata (1994)
- Dos caras distintas (1996)
- La historia de Los Secretos y CD de grandes éxtios(1996)
- CD Grandes éxitos II (1999)
- A tu lado (2000)

=== Solo career ===
- Álvaro Urquijo (1998)

=== Contribution with Taxi (2008) ===
In 2008, he was featured on Gibraltarian band Taxi's latest single, Quiero Un Camino.
