= 10 (Hombres G album) =

Studio album by Hombres G
- Released: 2007
- Genre: Rock, pop rock
- Label: Warner Music Spain
- Producer: Carlos Jean

Hombres G chronology
Todo esto es muy extraño (2005)	10 (2007)	Desayuno continental (2010)

Professional ratings
Review scores
Source	Rating
Allmusic	3.5/5 stars

10 is the tenth album recorded by Spanish rock band Hombres G, released in 2007.

10 is described as tuning into the "raw energy of early rock" and hinting at Euro-rock and at the "atmospheric aesthetic favored by Coldplay and the legendary U2" by Allmusic. The album cover depicts the band standing outside 10 Downing Street, London.

The album was nominated for "Best Pop Album By A Duo or Group With Vocal" at the 2008 Latin Grammy Awards.

== Track listing ==
All tracks are written by David Summers, except where noted

No.	Title	Length
1.	"No puedo apartar mis manos de tí"	3:25
2.	"Hombre real"	4:11
3.	"Nunca más"	5:12
4.	"Me siento bien"	3:40
5.	"Loco de amor"	3:20
6.	"Sólo quiero conocerte"	3:02
7.	"Sobre tu respiración"	3:57
8.	"Dificil de entender"	3:23
9.	"Mi vida sin tí"	3:59
10.	"Todo el mundo es feliz"	4:58
11.	"Multiplicados por 9" (Summers, Pancho Varona)	2:12
12.	"Nada que perder" (edición digital iTunes)	3:08

== Chart history ==
Chart	Provider(s)	Peak position
Spanish Albums Chart	PROMUSICAE	1

== Personnel ==
- David Summers – vocals, bass
- Rafa Gutiérrez – guitar
- Daniel Mezquita – guitar
- Javier Molina – drums
