= Los Secretos =

Spanish rock band

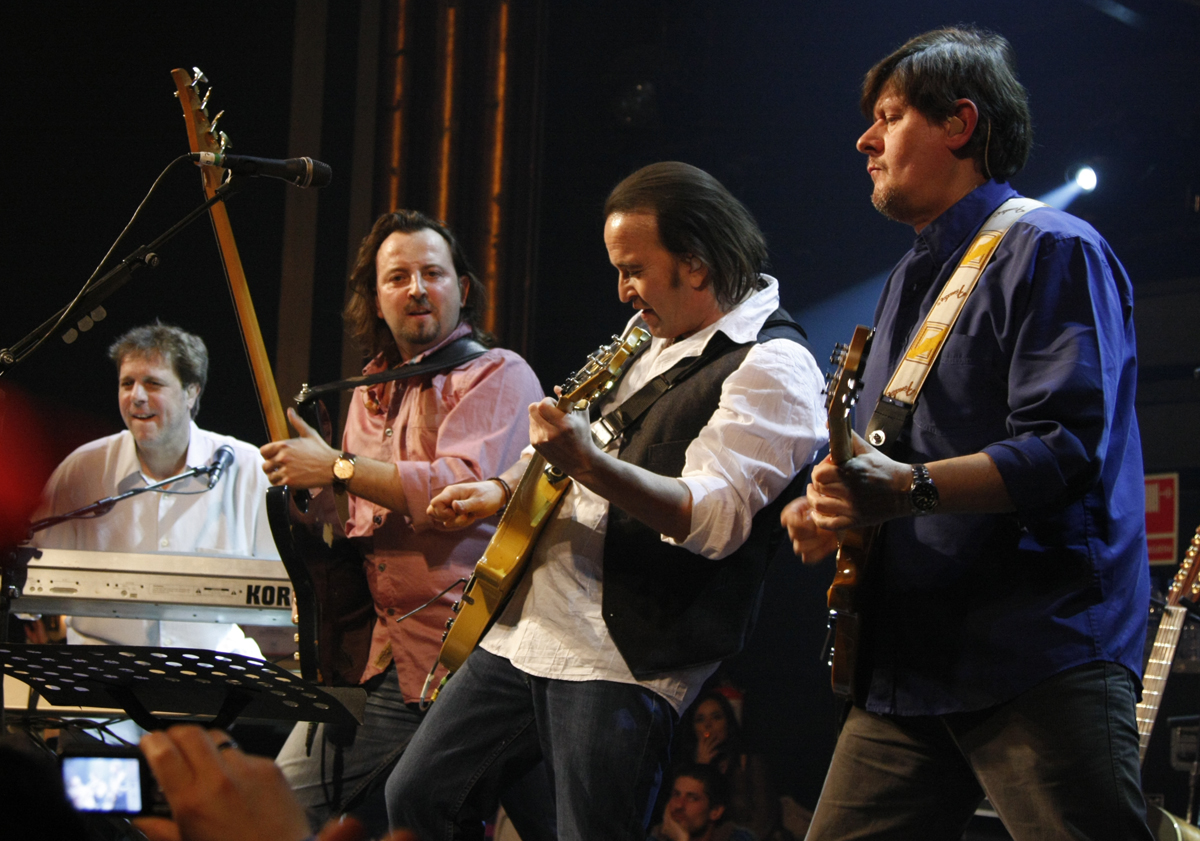
- Los Secretos performing in 2009

Background information
- Origin: Madrid, Spain
- Genres: Rock; new wave; pop rock; country rock
- Years active: 1978–present
- Members: Álvaro Urquijo; Ramón Arroyo; Jesús Redondo; Juanjo Ramos; Santiago Fernández
- Past members: Enrique Urquijo; José EnriqueCano; Pedro Antonio Díaz; Javier Urquijo; Nacho Lles; Paco Beneyto; Iñaki Conejero; Steve Jordan
- Website: los-secretos.net

Los Secretos are a Spanish rock band founded in Madrid in 1978 and often associated with the movida madrileña movement.

The band's lineup has undergone many changes over the years, beginning with the successive deaths of two of their drummers, Canito (1979) and Pedro A. Díaz (1984), both to traffic accidents. In their early years, the core of the band was made up of the three Urquijo brothers, Álvaro, Enrique, and Javier. Javier left the band in the mid-80's, and Enrique died of a drug overdose in 1999, leaving Álvaro as the sole remaining founding member. The band's current lineup consists of Álvaro Urquijo (vocals and guitars), Ramón Arroyo (guitars), Jesús Redondo (keyboards), Juanjo Ramos (bass), and Santi Fernández (drums).

Alongside such bands as Nacha Pop, Mamá, and Trastos, they were an integral part of the Spanish popular music revival which came to be known as "The New Wave of Madrid", and they have remained active for over thirty years; to this day they are considered to be one of the most important groups in the history of Spanish pop rock music.

== History ==
=== 1978–1979: Tos ===
In 1978, the Urquijo brothers Javier, Enrique, and Álvaro, together with drummer, composer, and singer José Enrique Cano, formed the band Tos. They were part of the explosion of creativity that took place in the music scene of Madrid at the time, while being influenced by various American country rock bands. In 1979, they recorded six demos that were later released as the EP Tos. On New Year's Eve of 1979, a traffic accident caused the death of Cano, thereby leading to the dissolution of the group.

=== 1980–1985: Formation of Los Secretos ===
In February 1980, a tribute concert to Canito was held in Madrid, which, in addition to the remaining members of Tos, included several groups from the "New Wave of Madrid", which later became subsumed in the movida madrileña movement.

The Urquijo brothers decide to continue playing music together, and with drummer Pedro Antonio Díaz, they relaunched the band under the name Los Secretos. They subsequently signed a recording deal with Polydor and recorded the 4-song EP Los Secretos. This was to be the forerunner of their first studio album, also titled Los Secretos, which was released in 1981.

In the next two years, Los Secretos released two new albums, Todo sigue igual (Everything remains the same - 1982), and Algo más (Something More - 1983). These were difficult years for the band, who received very little promotional support from their record company, and spent much of their time on the road. In May 1984, a traffic accident caused the death of Pedro Antonio Díaz, the band's second drummer to die in similar circumstances.

=== 1986–1988: Return ===
In 1986, after a brief hiatus, Enrique decided to change the band's direction, this time with a more country orientation and without the presence of Javier. In this formation, Enrique focused exclusively on singing, and left bass duties to his brother Alvaro. The same year, the band released the 6-track album El primer cruce (The first crossing), with the contributions of Ramón Arroyo on guitar, Nacho Lles on bass, and Steve Jordan on drums.

The album Continuará (To be continued) came out in 1987, and 1988 saw the release of the band's first live recording, titled simply Directo (Live). This recording was the first to feature the band's current keyboardist Jesús Redondo. Guest artists who collaborated on the album include José María Granados (Mamá), Javier Teixidor (Mermelada), and Joaquín Sabina. Directo went on to garner the band their first gold record.

=== 1989–1998: Years of stability ===
The year 1989 saw the release of the band's sixth studio album, titled La calle del olvido (The street of oblivion). The group's membership also stabilized around this time, settling on a lineup that would stay more or less the same for the next decade, with Enrique, Álvaro, Ramón, and Jesús. Nacho Lles had left during the recording of the album and Steve Jordan departed after the record was finished.

The albums Adiós tristeza (Goodbye sadness) and Cambio de planes (Change of plans) followed in 1991 and 1993 respectively.

During this period, Enrique launched his side project Los Problemas, which allowed him to explore other musical styles. The group released their debut album in 1993, titled Enrique Urquijo y Los Problemas (Enrique and the problems), which included original songs as well as versions of songs by Los Secretos and other artists such as Nacha Pop, Radio Futura, and Alaska y los Pegamoides.

Dos caras distintas (Two different faces), recorded in the UK, was released in 1995 and was the first Los Secretos album recorded outside of Spain. British session musicians were hired to fill in on bass and drums.

The band's first compilation album, Grandes éxitos (Big hits), came out in 1996.

1998 was a quiet year for the band as they each focused on other projects. Álvaro released a solo album titled Álvaro Urquijo, and Enrique's band Los Problemas issued their sophomore effort, Desde que no nos vemos (Since we haven't seen each other).

=== 1999–2001: Death of Enrique and tribute album ===
In 1999, Los Secretos prepared the launch of their second compilation album, Grandes éxitos II. On the night of 17 November (precisely one day before the album was released), Enrique was found dead of a heroin overdose. This was a tremendous blow to the group, whose future appeared uncertain.

In 2000, Álvaro, Ramón, and Jesús organized the recording of a tribute album to Enrique, titled A tu lado - Un homenaje a Enrique Urquijo (Next to you: a tribute to Enrique Urquijo), which featured the late musician's compositions as interpreted by the remaining three members of the band, accompanied by numerous guest musicians including Carlos Goñi, Antonio Vega, Carlos Tarque, Ariel Rot, Celtas Cortos, Cómplices, Cristina Lliso, Javier Álvarez, David Summers Rodríguez, José María Granados, Luz Casal, Manolo Tena, Miguel Ríos, Mikel Erentxun, Nacho Campillo, Pau Donés, and Enrique's brother Javier Urquijo.

=== 2002–2006: Return with Álvaro as frontman ===
In 2002, Los Secretos returned to the studio to work on their first album following Enrique's death, with Álvaro in the lead. Sólo para escuchar (For listening only) was released that year. The following year saw the release of the band's second live album, titled Con cierto sentido (With some sense). They returned to the studio once again in 2006 to publish their eleventh studio album, Una y mil veces (One and a thousand times).

=== 2007–2009: 30 years of Los Secretos ===
In 2007, 30 years after their beginning as Tos, Los Secretos published a box set titled 30 años (30 years), which included two CDs with old and new material, a booklet with the band's biography and discography, and two DVDs of collected videos.

A live album was released in 2008, titled Gracias por elegirme - Las Ventas 10 de octubre de 2008 (Thank you for choosing me - Las Ventas, 10 October 2008). This concert was held at the famous bullring in Madrid to commemorate three decades of the band's existence, and included numerous contributions from guest artists.

=== 2010–present ===
Los Secretos released two studio albums in the 2010s: En este mundo raro (In this strange world) in 2011 and Algo prestado (Something borrowed) in 2015. The latter is a tribute to the artists that have inspired them throughout their career, including Graham Parker, Peter Gabriel, Nick Lowe, Gram Parsons, Foreigner, Ry Cooder, and Ron Sexsmith.

== Band members ==
Current

- Álvaro Urquijo – vocals, guitar
- Ramón Arroyo – guitar
- Jesús Redondo – keyboards
- Juanjo Ramos – bass
- Santiago Fernández – drums

Past

- Enrique Urquijo
- José Enrique "Canito" Cano
- Pedro Antonio Díaz
- Javier Urquijo
- Nacho Lles
- Paco Beneyto
- Iñaki Conejero
- Steve Jordan

== Discography ==
Studio albums

- Los Secretos (1981)
- Todo sigue igual (1982)
- Algo más (1983)
- El primer cruce (1986)
- Continuará (1987)
- La calle del olvido (1989)
- Adiós tristeza (1991)
- Cambio de planes (1993)
- Dos caras distintas (1995)
- Sólo para escuchar (2002)
- Una y mil veces (2006)
- En este mundo raro (2011)
- Algo prestado (2015)
- Mi paraíso (2019)

EPs

- Tos (as Tos) (1979)
- Los Secretos (1980)

Live albums

- Directo (1988)
- Con cierto sentido (2003)
- Gracias por elegirme - Las Ventas 10 de octubre de 2008 (2008)
- Sinfónico (2012)
- Desde Que No Nos Vemos (2021)

Compilations

- Lo mejor (1985)
- La historia de Los Secretos (1996)
- Grandes éxitos (1996)
- La historia de Los Secretos (1996) - 3-disc box set
- Grandes éxitos II (1999)
- A tu lado - Un homenaje a Enrique Urquijo (2000)
- Grandes éxitos, ed. revisada y remasterizada (2001)
- 30 años (2007)
- Una vida a tu lado (2017) [4 CD + 1 DVD]

Singles

- "Déjame / Niño Mimado" (1980)
- "Todo Sigue Igual" (1981)
- "Ojos De Perdida" (1981)
- "Sobre un vidrio mojado / Me siento mejor (1981)
- "Problemas" (1982)
- "Hoy No" (1983)
- "No Me Imagino" (1983)
- "Quiero beber hasta perder el control" (1986)
- "El Primer Cruce" (1986)
- "Buena chica / Ella Me Dijo" (1987)
- "Por El Tunel" (1987)
- "Sin Dirección" (1988)
- "No Sé Si Se Acuerda" (1988)
- "Volver A Ser Un Niño" (1988)
- "Nada Mas" (1988)
- "No Vuelvas Nunca Más" (1989)
- "Que Solo Estás" (1989)
- "Si Te Vas" (1989)
- "Soy Como Dos" (1990)
- "Culpable" (1990)
- "La Calle Del Olvido" (1990)
- "El Hotel Del Amor" (1991)
- "Bailando En El Desván" (1992)
- "Buscando" (1992)
- "Ojos de gata" (1992)
- "He Perdido El Tiempo" (1993)
- "Agárrate A Mí, María" (1996)
- "Soy Como Dos" (1996)
- "Volver A Ser Un Niño" (1999)
- "Hoy La Vi" (2000)
- "Años Atrás" (2003)
- "Eres Tú" (2020)
