= Perdido en el espacio =

Studio album by David Summers
- Released: 1997
- Genre: Rock, Pop rock
- Label: Warner Music
- Producer: Nigel Walker

David Summers chronology
David Summers (1994)	Perdido en el espacio (1997)

Perdido en el espacio (Lost in the space) is the second studio album by Spanish musician David Summers, released in 1997.

== Track listing ==
Perdido en el espacio (1997)
No.	Title	Length
1.	"La luna es mía"	4:07
2.	"Si sí, o si no"	3:54
3.	"Todo va a cambiar"	4:20
4.	"Pan de oro"	4:22
5.	"Al lado del mar"	4:52
6.	"Perdido en el espacio"	5:37
7.	"No sé que mide el infinito"	4:42
8.	"Las murallas de Jericó"	5:21
9.	"Una palabra tuya"	3:56
10.	"La lluvia entre nosotros"	5:37
