= Estamos locos... ¿o qué? =

Studio album by Hombres G
- Released: 1987
- Recorded: Early 1987
- Genre: Rock, pop rock
- Label: WEA Latina Spain
- Producer: Carlos Narea

Hombres G chronology
La cagaste... Burt Lancaster (1986)	Estamos locos... ¿o qué? (1987)	Agitar antes de usar (1988)

Singles from Estamos locos... ¿o qué?
- 1. "Una mujer de bandera" Released: 1987; 2. "Temblando" Released: 1987; 3. "No, no, no..." Released: 1987; 4. "Y cayó la bomba (fétida)" Released: 1987

Estamos locos... ¿o qué? (Castilian for Are we crazy... or what?) is the third studio album by Spanish rock band Hombres G, released in 1987. The title, when translated literally into English, means "Are we crazy, or what?"

== History ==
After finishing filming their first movie, Sufre mamón, Hombres G began work on their third studio album. David Summers isolated himself for a week at a family house in Huelva and upon returning to the rest of the band, had composed 12 songs. To avoid pressure, Hombres G left for Manchester, where they recorded Estamos locos... ¿o qué? with producer Carlos Narea.

== Track listing ==
All tracks are written by David Summers.

No.	Title	Length
1.	"Una mujer de bandera"	3:06
2.	"Sólo me faltas tú"	2:35
3.	"Mis amigos"	4:33
4.	"Solo otra vez"	3:46
5.	"Huellas en la bajamar"	3:28
6.	"No, no... no"	3:08
7.	"En mi coche"	4:03
8.	"Y cayó la bomba (fétida)"	3:55
9.	"¿Qué te he hecho yo?"	2:34
10.	"Temblando"	3:13

== Personnel ==
- David Summers – vocals, bass
- Rafa Gutiérrez – guitar
- Daniel Mezquita – guitar
- Javier Molina – drums
