= La cagaste... Burt Lancaster =

Studio album by Hombres G
- Released: 1986
- Recorded: February 1986
- Genre: Rock, pop rock
- Label: Warner Music Spain
- Producer: Paco Trinidad

Hombres G chronology
Hombres G (1985)	La cagaste... Burt Lancaster (1986)	Estamos locos... ¿o qué? (1987)

Singles from La cagaste... Burt Lancaster
- 1. "Marta tiene un marcapasos" Released: 1986; 2. "Visite nuestro bar" Released: 1986; 3. "Te quiero" Released: 1986; 4. "El ataque de las chicas cocodrilo" Released: 1987

La cagaste... Burt Lancaster (the Spanish for "You screwed it up... Burt Lancaster") is the second studio album by Spanish rock band Hombres G, released in 1986.

== History ==
Hombres G entered TRAK studios in February 1986 to record their second studio album, La cagaste... Burt Lancaster. They recovered the song "Marta tiene un marcapasos" from the Lollipop singles and released a new version which became a top hit.

== Track listing ==
All tracks are written by David Summers.

No.	Title	Length
1.	"Visite nuestro bar"	3:22
2.	"Indiana"	2:54
3.	"En la playa"	4:09
4.	"Un par de palabras"	3:16
5.	"Te quiero"	3:45
6.	"Marta tiene un marcapasos"	2:13
7.	"El ataque de las chicas cocodrilo"	3:05
8.	"Él es... Rita la cantaora"	3:54
9.	"Dos imanes"	3:58
10.	"La carretera"	4:08

== Personnel ==
- David Summers – vocals, bass
- Rafa Gutiérrez – guitar
- Daniel Mezquita – guitar
- Javier Molina – drums

== Charts ==
Weekly chart performance for La cagaste... Burt Lancaster
Chart (2024)	Peak position
Spanish Albums (PROMUSICAE)	86
