= Agitar antes de usar =

Studio album by Hombres G
- Released: 1988
- Recorded: March 1988
- Genre: Rock, pop rock
- Label: Warner Music Spain
- Producer: Carlos Narea

Hombres G chronology
Estamos locos... ¿o qué? (1987)	Agitar antes de usar (1988)	Voy a pasármelo bien (1989)

Agitar antes de usar ("Shake before using") is the fourth studio album recorded by Spanish rock band Hombres G, released in 1988.

== Track listing ==
Agitar antes de usar
No.	Title	Length
1.	"Tengo Una Chica"	3:53
2.	"No Aguanto A Tu Prima"	2:40
3.	"Nassau"	4:30
4.	"Si No Te Tengo A Tí"	4:49
5.	"Viernes"	3:09
6.	"Suéltate El Pelo"	3:12
7.	"Será Esta Noche"	4:07
8.	"He Recuperado Mi Cabello"	3:06
9.	"La Madre de Ana"	3:38
10.	"Viernes (instrumental)"	1:41

== Personnel ==
- David Summers – vocals, bass
- Rafa Gutiérrez – guitar
- Daniel Mezquita – guitar
- Javier Molina – drums
