= Todo esto es muy extraño =

Studio album by Hombres G
- Released: March 8, 2005
- Genre: Rock, pop rock
- Label: DRO East West
- Producer: Nigel Walker

Hombres G chronology
Peligrosamente Juntos (2002)	Todo esto es muy extraño (2005)	10 (2007)

Todo esto es muy extraño is the ninth album recorded by Spanish rock band Hombres G, released in 2005. It is the first studio album to follow Historia del bikini, which was released 12 years earlier in 1992.

== Track listing ==
Todo esto es muy extraño (2004)
No.	Title	Length
1.	"El diablo dentro de mi"	3:17
2.	"¿Por qué no ser amigos?"	3:21
3.	"No lo sé"	3:14
4.	"¿Qué soy yo para ti?"	5:36
5.	"He de saber"	2:51
6.	"Un poco más"	3:26
7.	"Me quiero enamorar"	2:39
8.	"Todos menos tú"	4:09
9.	"Si te vas"	2:51
10.	"El cielo herido"	2:13
11.	"El resplandor"	4:17
12.	"¿Por qué no ser amigos? (dueto con Dani Martín)"	3:20

== Chart history ==
Chart	Provider(s)	Peak position
Spanish Albums Chart	PROMUSICAE	4

== Personnel ==
- David Summers – vocals, bass
- Rafa Gutiérrez – guitar
- Daniel Mezquita – guitar
- Javier Molina – drums
- Dani Martín - accompanying vocals on ¿Por qué no ser amigos?
