= Ésta es tu vida =

Studio album by Hombres G
- Released: 1990
- Genre: Rock, pop rock
- Label: Producciones Twins
- Producer: Nigel Walker, Geoff Foster, & Hombres G

Hombres G chronology
Voy a pasármelo bien (1989)	Ésta es tu vida (1990)	Historia del bikini (1992)

Ésta es tu vida (Spanish for This is your life) is the sixth album recorded by Spanish rock band Hombres G, released in 1990.

== Track listing ==
LP version
No.	Title	Length
1.	"Ésta es tu vida"	4:30
2.	"En la arena"	3:50
3.	"El Rey del Rock'n'Roll"	3:22
4.	"Estoy pintando tu sonrisa"	2:14
5.	"Sólo al llover"	5:35
6.	"No grites mi nombre"	3:45
7.	"Rita"	2:54
8.	"Tengo hambre"	2:53
9.	"Si alguna vez"	3:48
10.	"La primavera"	2:53
11.	"El tiempo no es mi amigo"	3:37

CD version
No.	Title	Length
1.	"Ésta es tu vida"	4:30
2.	"En la arena"	3:50
3.	"El Rey del Rock'n'Roll"	3:22
4.	"Voy a hablar con él"	2:44
5.	"Estoy pintando tu sonrisa"	2:14
6.	"Sólo al llover"	5:35
7.	"No grites mi nombre"	3:45
8.	"Rita"	2:54
9.	"Tengo hambre"	2:53
10.	"Si alguna vez"	3:48
11.	"La primavera"	2:53
12.	"Siempre huele a gasolina"	4:05
13.	"El tiempo no es mi amigo"	3:37
14.	"Ésta es tu vida - II"	2:42

* The CD version adds three "b" sides from album singles.

== Personnel ==
- David Summers – vocals, bass
- Rafa Gutiérrez – guitar
- Daniel Mezquita – guitar
- Javier Molina – drums
