= Enrique Urquijo =

Spanish musician (1960–1999)

Enrique Urquijo (15 February 1960 – 17 November 1999) was a Spanish singer, songwriter, and guitarist.

Born in Madrid, Spain, Urquijo is best known as one of three brothers in the Spanish new wave music group Los Secretos formed in 1980. Later in the career of Los Secretos, he formed his parallel band Los Problemas.

Urquijo died in Madrid on 17 November 1999 of a drug overdose. He is buried in the Cementerio de la Almudena in Madrid.

== Discography ==
=== With Los Secretos ===
- Tos (1978)
- Los Secretos EP (1980)
- Los Secretos (1981)
- Todo sigue igual (1982)
- Algo más (1983)
- Lo mejor (1985)
- El primer cruce (1986)
- Continuará (1987)
- Directo (1988)
- La calle del olvido (1990)
- Adiós tristeza (1991)
- Cambio de planes (1993)
- Dos caras distintas (1996)
- La historia de Los Secretos (1996)
- Grandes éxitos (1996)
- Grandes éxitos II (1999)
- A tu lado (2000)

=== With Los Problemas ===
- Enrique Urquijo y Los Problemas (1993)
- Desde que no nos vemos (1998)
