= David Summers Rodríguez =

Spanish singer

David Summers
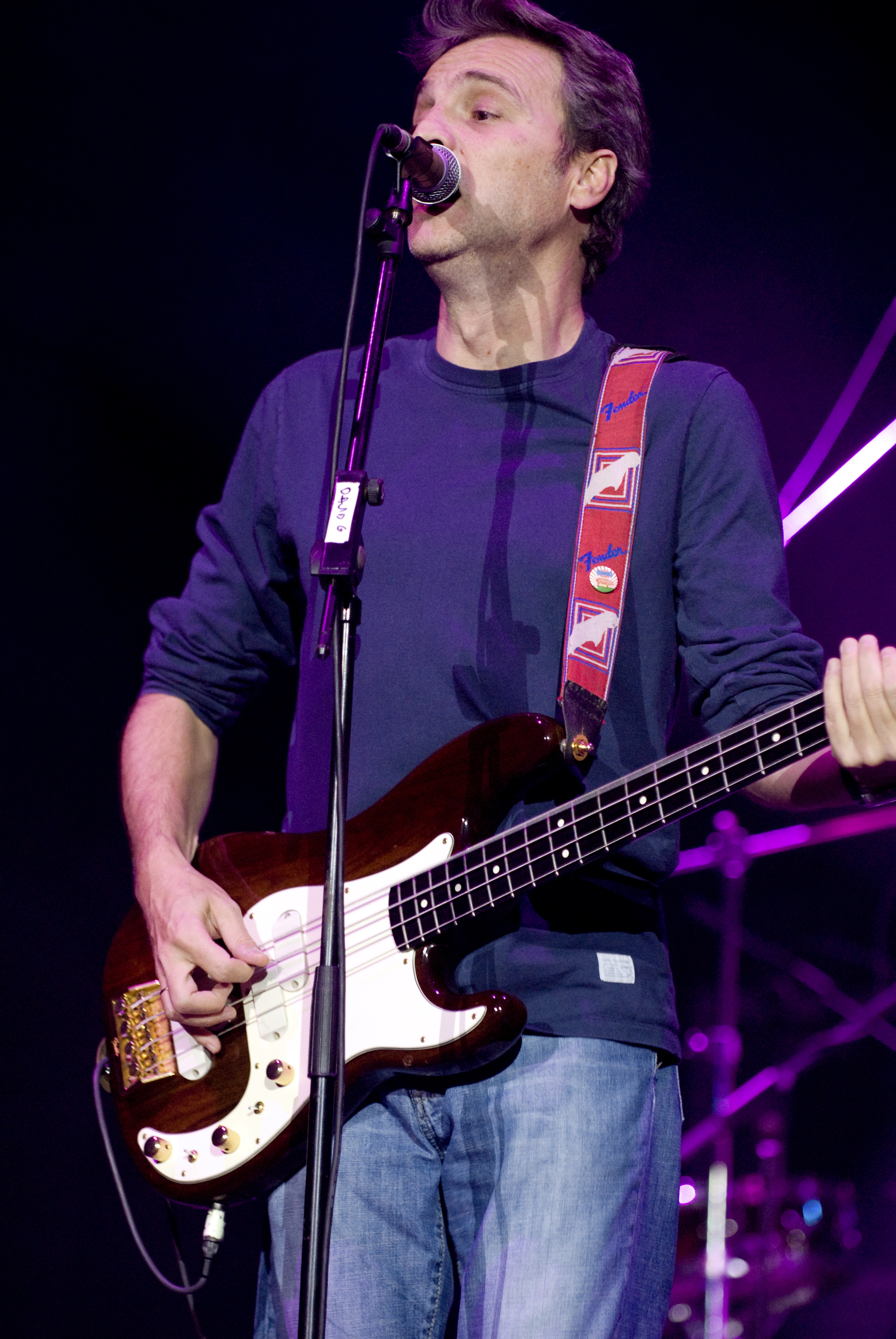
- Summers in 2007

Background information
- Born: David Summers Rodríguez; 26 February 1964 (age 62); Madrid, Spain
- Genres: Rock; pop
- Occupations: Singer; musician; songwriter
- Instruments: Vocals; bass guitar
- Years active: 1982–present
- Member of: Hombres G

David Summers Rodríguez (born 26 February 1964) is a Spanish musician who is the lead vocalist and bassist of the pop/rock band Hombres G.

== Early and personal life ==
Summers was born in the Chamberí district of Madrid, Spain, to Manuel Summers Rivero, a Spanish film director and screenwriter of partial Irish descent, and Consuelo Rodríguez Marquez on 26 February 1964.

Summers married Marta Madruga on 18 January 1992 and they're the parents of twins, Daniel and Lucía, born in 2000. Madruga played the role of Summers' girlfriend in the 1987 film Sufre Mamón and it is speculated that she is the subject of such songs as "Marta tiene un marcapasos". In 2024, Summers married Christine Cambeiro, an American expat.

== Career ==
=== The band ===
When Summers was in his late teens, he and three other friends formed a group by the name of Molina formed a second group called "La Burguesía Revolucionaria". However, the three alone were not successful. Summers then met Rafael Gutierrez in 1982 while they were both conducting business at Television Española (TVE) and the two became friends. Rafa accepted Summers's invitation to join the rest of the group and they renamed themselves "Hombres G" after the 1935 James Cagney movie, G Men (which in Spain aired as Contra el imperio del crimen).

Summers' songwriting lead and the newly launched label, Producciones Twins, helped the quartet establish a successful music career. The group's early work encompassed a juvenile and goofy nature, which set them apart as a distinct musical act. Releasing seven albums and two movies through the year 1992, the group became one of the most popular Spanish groups of the 1980s – evident by strong sales and a responsive fan community.

The group split in 1993 but reconvened in 2002 to tour America and Spain. To this day, Hombres G continue to release new material.

=== Solo career ===
Summers pursued a solo career after Hombres G broke up in 1993. The only member to remain actively involved in the recording of music, Summers released three studio albums and one live album. The recording of his first album, David Summers (1994) concurred with the death of his father, and for that reason Summers dedicated the album to him.

Most of his solo work has been described as romantic, deep and melodious. Summers has composed for the likes of Luz Casal and Presuntos Implicados.

In 2017, he released a collaboration with Aleks Syntek with the remake of the single El ataque de las chicas cocodrilo.

== Discography ==
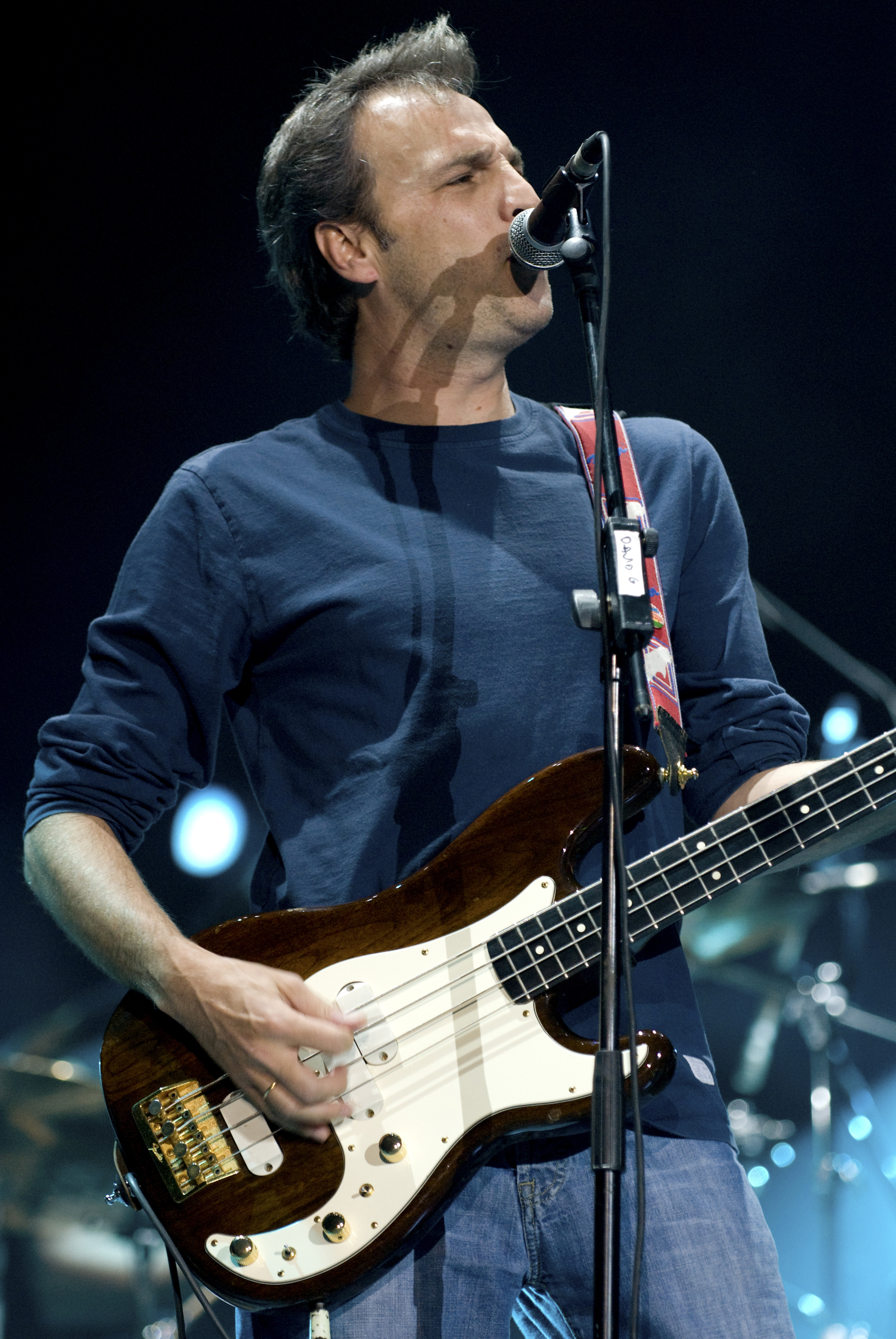
Summers with Hombres G in 2007

=== As a member of Hombres G ===
- Hombres G (1985)
- La cagaste... Burt Lancaster (1986)
- Estamos locos... ¿o qué? (1987)
- Agitar antes de usar (1988)
- Voy a pasármelo bien (1989)
- Esta es tú vida (1990)
- Historia del bikini (1992)
- Peligrosamente Juntos (2002)
- Todo esto es muy extraño (2004)
- 10 (2007)
- Desayuno continental (2010)

=== Solo ===
- David Summers (1994)
- Perdido en el espacio (1997)
- En directo desde el Metropolitan (1998)
- Basado en hechos reales (2001)

== Filmography ==
- Sufre Mamón (1987)
- Suéltate el pelo (1988)
