= Hombres G (album) =

Studio album by Hombres G
- Released: March 11, 1985
- Genre: Dance-punk, surf
- Length: 38:04
- Label: Producciones Twins
- Producer: Paco Trinidad

Hombres G chronology
Hombres G (1985)	La cagaste... Burt Lancaster (1986)

Singles from Hombres G
- 1. "Devuélveme a mi chica" Released: January 1985; 2. "Venezia" Released: 1985; 3. "Dejad que las niñas se acerquen a mí" Released: 1985

Hombres G is the debut album released by Spanish rock band Hombres G in 1985.

== History ==
Hombres G's original label, Lollipop, was unable to further support the band in early 1984.

At that time, Ricardo Chirinos, lead singer of Pistones, told Paco Martín that Hombres G would be present at Radio España for an interview regarding one of their concerts at Rock-Ola. Paco had just established a new label, Twins, and signed a contract with the band after attending one of their concerts.

Hombres G began recording their new album two weeks later at Estudios Trak. The band recorded "Venezia", a new version of the previous single, and the soon-to-be hit, "Devuélveme a mi chica". Among the album's ballads was a cover of Alice Cooper's "I Never Cry", which they named "No lloraré". They also adapted Vladimir Cosma's song "Reality" from the motion picture, La Boum, and called it "Sin ti".

Twins initial release attempts weren't very successful and Pepe Escribano, a partner of Paco Martín, decided to leave the company. Weeks later, however, Hombres G broke into the mainstream and sales of the album leaped.

== Content ==
In 2010, the following statement appeared on HombresG.Net, referring to the controversial content of the song "Matar a Castro": "If Fidel hears me, please know that I'm sorry, that even though I don't like him, I don't have an interest for his death, his or anyone's; that was a youth's naivety. - David Summers"

== Track listing ==
All tracks are written by David Summers, except where noted.

No.	Title	Length
1.	"Venezia"	4:33
2.	"Vuelve a mí"	3:19
3.	"Dejad que las niñas se acerquen a mí"	4:07
4.	"Hace un año" (Mezquita Hardy, Summers)	4:02
5.	"No lloraré" (Summers, Alice Cooper)	3:36
6.	"Devuélveme a mi chica"	3:16
7.	"Matar a Castro"	3:52
8.	"Lawrence de Arabia"	2:53
9.	"No te puedo besar"	3:45
10.	"Sin ti" (Summers, Vladimir Cosma)	4:38

== Personnel ==
- David Summers – vocals, bass
- Rafa Gutiérrez – guitar
- Daniel Mezquita – guitar, keyboards, piano
- Javier Molina – drums
