= Peligrosamente Juntos =

Compilation album by Hombres G
- Released: 2002
- Genre: Rock, pop rock
- Label: DRO East West
- Producer: Hombres G

Hombres G chronology
Historia del bikini (1992)	Peligrosamente Juntos (2002)	Todo esto es muy extraño (2004)

Peligrosamente Juntos is the eighth album released by Spanish rock band Hombres G, released in 2002. A second version was released in 2004.

== Track listing ==
Peligrosamente Juntos (2002)
No.	Title	Length
1.	"Venezia"	4:35
2.	"Devuélveme a mi chica"	3:19
3.	"Visite nuestro bar"	3:27
4.	"Marta tiene un marcapasos"	2:15
5.	"Indiana"	2:55
6.	"Un par de palabras"	3:16
7.	"Te quiero"	3:44
8.	"El ataque de las chicas cocodrilo"	3:07
9.	"Temblando"	3:10
10.	"Una mujer de bandera"	3:05
11.	"Si no te tengo a ti"	4:46
12.	"Suéltate el pelo"	3:14
13.	"Voy a pasármelo bien"	4:43
14.	"Esta es tú vida"	4:32
15.	"La primavera"	2:53
16.	"Un minuto nada +"	4:27
17.	"No te escaparas"	3:11
18.	"Lo noto"	4:19
19.	"Te ví"	3:23
20.	"Intimidad"	3:15
21.	"En otro mundo"	3:46
22.	"Temblando (en directo '02)"	3:48
23.	"La cagaste Burt Lancaster (demo '86)"	3:40
24.	"Nassau (demo '86)"	4:37
25.	"El tiempo no es mi amigo (demo '90)"	3:44
26.	"Mi cumpleaños (demo '90)"	3:55

Peligrosamente Juntos (2004)
No.	Title	Length
1.	"Lo Noto"	4:20
2.	"En otro mundo"	3:45
3.	"Nassau (demo '86)"	4:36
4.	"Marta tiene un marcapasos"	2:12
5.	"Dos imanes (nueva versión)"	3:56
6.	"El ataque de las chicas cocodrilo"	3:04
7.	"Si no te tengo a ti"	4:46
8.	"Indiana"	2:53
9.	"Visite nuestro bar"	3:21
10.	"Te quiero (nueva version)"	3:47
11.	"Suéltate el pelo"	3:12
12.	"La cagaste Burt Lancaster (demo '86)"	3:40
13.	"La carretera"	4:08
14.	"El tiempo no es mi amigo (demo '90)"	3:43
15.	"Un minuto nada mas"	4:26
16.	"Voy a pasarmelo bien"	4:43
17.	"Mi cumpleaños (demo '90)"	3:55
18.	"Esta es tú vida"	4:32
19.	"Devuélveme a mi chica"	3:19
20.	"Temblando (en directo)"	3:48
21.	"Venezia"	4:35

== Personnel ==
- David Summers – vocals, bass
- Rafa Gutiérrez – guitar
- Daniel Mezquita – guitar
- Javier Molina – drums
