= David Summers (album) =

Studio album by David Summers
- Released: 26 August 1994
- Label: Warner Music

David Summers chronology
David Summers (1994)	Perdido en el espacio (1997)

Professional ratings
Review scores
Source	Rating
Allmusic	3/5 stars

David Summers is the first solo album released by Spanish musician David Summers in 1994.

The album includes collaborations with Alejandro Sanz and Dani Mezquita, and was dedicated to David's father, Manuel Summers, in light of his death.

== Track listing ==
David Summers (1994)
No.	Title	Length
1.	"El mundo grita"	4:04
2.	"El beso y el perfume"	5:58
3.	"Si me dejas"	6:20
4.	"De vuelta a casa"	4:44
5.	"Quiero que tu seas para mi"	4:14
6.	"Ámame dos veces"	4:26
7.	"Mi amor"	4:01
8.	"2.000 kilómetros"	4:07
9.	"Donde ella lloró"	4:53
10.	"Todo lo que puedo decir"	3:50
