= Voy a pasármelo bien (album) =

Studio album by Hombres G
- Released: 1989
- Recorded: Summer 1989
- Genre: Rock, pop rock
- Label: Warner Music Spain
- Producer: Carlos Narea & Nigel Walker

Hombres G chronology
Agitar antes de usar (1988)	Voy a pasármelo bien (1989)	Esta es tu vida (1990)

Voy a pasármelo bien (Spanish or I'm Going to Have Fun) is the fifth studio album recorded by Spanish rock band Hombres G, released in 1989.

It's the first and only album on whose cover appears the group members. All the previous releases always had covers on which any member appeared.

== Track listing ==
Voy a pasármelo bien
No.	Title	Length
1.	"Voy a Pasármelo Bien"	3:57
2.	"El Último Baile"	3:08
3.	"Te Necesito"	4:07
4.	"Chico, Tienes Que Cuidarte"	4:05
5.	"Aprender a Caer"	2:55
6.	"Madrid, Madrid"	3:47
7.	"Esta Tarde"	2:51
8.	"México"	4:25
9.	"Tú Me Gustas"	2:56
10.	"Dulce Belén"	4:40

== Personnel ==
- David Summers – vocals, bass
- Rafa Gutiérrez – guitar
- Daniel Mezquita – guitar
- Javier Molina – drums
