= Historia del bikini =

Studio album by Hombres G
- Released: 1992
- Genre: Rock, pop rock
- Label: Producciones Twins
- Producer: Colin Fairley

Hombres G chronology
Esta es tú vida (1990)	Historia del bikini (1992)	Peligrosamente Juntos (2002)

Historia del bikini (History of bikini) is the seventh album recorded by Spanish rock band Hombres G, released in 1992.

== Track listing ==
Historia del bikini
No.	Title	Length
1.	"Un minuto nada +"	4:26
2.	"Esto es el mar"	5:20
3.	"Encima de ti"	3:46
4.	"El orgullo de mamá"	5:14
5.	"Tormenta contigo"	5:47
6.	"El otro lado"	4:38
7.	"Ella es una mujer"	3:12
8.	"Los dos hemos caído"	5:56
9.	"Si tú quieres"	5:01
10.	"Blues del camarero"	5:38
11.	"Te echo de menos"	3:55

== Personnel ==
- David Summers – vocals, bass
- Rafa Gutiérrez – guitar
- Daniel Mezquita – guitar
- Javier Molina – drums
