= Invierno =

Invierno may refer to:

- The Winter (Spanish: El Invierno), a 2016 Argentine film
- Mina Invierno, a coal mine in Riesco Island, Chile
- "El Invierno", a tapestry cartoon by Francisco Goya, c. 1787
- "Invierno", a short story in Junot Díaz' 2012 collection This Is How You Lose Her

== Songs ==
- "Invierno", on the album Secuencia, Reik, 2006
- "Invierno", on the album Las 4 Estaciones del Amor, Natalia Lafourcade, 2007
- "Invierno", on the album Los Claxons, Los Claxons, 2010
- "Invierno", on the album Revoltosa, Bongo Botrako, 2012

== See also ==
- Winter (Spanish: invierno)
