= Parranda (disambiguation) =

Parranda is a Galician-Spanish terminology with a variety of meanings—generally referring to a carousal, jamboree, spree, or party. Conjointly, music and dance have adopted its name as well.

Parranda may also refer to:

== Culture & Holidays ==
- Parranda, a Puerto Rican Christmas tradition, in which family and friends casually sing secular aguinaldos
- Parranda (dance), a Spanish dance style from the Murcia region, similar to the seguidilla
- Las Parrandas de Remedios, a.k.a. Parrandas, street fairs that occur throughout Cuba twice a year
- Parranda of San Pedro, a Venezuelan religious festivity celebrated every June 29 in the state of Miranda

== Entertainment ==
- Parranda, a 1977 Spanish-language drama film directed by Gonzalo Suárez
- "Andamos de Parranda", a 2014 single by Mexican hip-hop artist MC Davo from his third album, El Dominio
- "Mi Parranda", a song off of Menudo's 1982 Christmas album, Feliz Navidad; sung by Óscar Meléndez
- "La Parranda", a 1996 promotional single by Cuban-American singer Gloria Estefan
- Punk Parranda, a 2014 live album from Spanish alternative rock band Bongo Botrako

== See also ==
- Aguinaldo (music), a genre of Puerto Rican and Venezuelan music, played by parrandas
- A Esmorga, the 1959 novel by Galician author Eduardo Blanco Amor, adapted into aforementioned film, Parranda
