= Drown (short story collection) =

Short story collection by Junot Diaz

- First edition cover image
- Author: Junot Díaz
- Language: English
- Genre: Fiction, Short story collection
- Publisher: Riverhead Books
- Publication date: 1996
- Publication place: United States of America
- Media type: Print (hardcover)
- Pages: 208
- ISBN: 1-57322-606-8

Drown is the semi-autobiographical, debut short story collection from Dominican-American author Junot Díaz that address the trials of Dominican immigrants as they attempt to find some semblance of the American Dream after immigrating to America. The stories are set in the context of 1980s America, and are narrated by an adult who is looking back at his childhood. Drown was published by Riverhead Books in 1996.

Drown precedes his novel The Brief Wondrous Life of Oscar Wao, which won the 2008 Pulitzer Prize for Fiction, and the short story collection This Is How You Lose Her. Drown is dedicated to his mother, Virtudes Díaz.

== Background ==
Díaz was born in the Dominican Republic and came with his family to New Jersey when he was a young boy. When asked if he remembers the experience, he says: "If I burn your entire country down, would you remember being six or seven? There is nothing like the trauma of losing one's country and gaining another. It makes recollection very, very sharp." Díaz's father came to the U.S. first, got a job at a Reynolds aluminum warehouse in Elizabeth, N.J., and Díaz, his mother, and four siblings followed five years later in 1974. The people living in his neighborhood, Díaz says, were "colorful, poor, working, and transitional," and the area itself was "no joke," but his family was "already accustomed to a very rough-and-tumble upbringing." Of himself, Díaz says, "I was a child. I didn't speak English, and I experienced the competitiveness of America, and it's a profoundly cruel childhood culture.”

Díaz attended Kean College in Union, New Jersey for one year before transferring and ultimately completing his B.A. at Rutgers University in 1992. Yunior would become central to much of Díaz's work and Díaz would later explain: "My idea, ever since Drown, was to write six or seven books about him that would form one big novel." He earned his MFA from Cornell University in 1995, where he wrote most of his first collection of short stories.

As David Gates wrote in his The New York Times review of Drown: "In five of these ten stories, his narrator is young Ramon de las Casas, called Yunior, whose father abandons his wife and children for years before returning to the Dominican Republic and bringing them back with him to New Jersey. In other stories, the nameless tellers may or may not be Yunior, but they're all young Latino men with the same well-defended sensitivity, uneasy relations with women and obsessive watchfulness."

== Contents ==
Story	Originally published in
"Ysrael"	Story
"Fiesta, 1980"	Story
"Aurora"	Original
"Aguantando"	Original
"Drown"	The New Yorker
"Boyfriend"	Time Out New York
"Edison, New Jersey"	The Paris Review
"How to Date a Browngirl, Blackgirl, Whitegirl, or Halfie"	The New Yorker
"No Face"	Original
"Negocios"	Original

== Synopsis ==
Epigraph of Drown

The fact that I
am writing to you
in English
already falsifies what I
wanted to tell you.
My subject:
how to explain to you that I
don't belong to English
though I belong nowhere else

— Gustavo Pérez Firmat

=== "Ysrael" ===
This story was included in The Best American Short Stories, 1996. "Ysrael" tells the story of Yunior and his brother Rafa in the Dominican Republic searching for a neighborhood boy whose face was disfigured by a pig, causing him to wear a mask at all times.

=== "Fiesta, 1980" ===
This story is mostly about the narrator's father, a party at his aunt and uncle's, and his father's relationship with "the Puerto Rican woman".

=== "Aurora" ===
This story discusses Lucero's life as a drug dealer and his romantic relationship with a heroin addict. Here, he dreams of having a normal life with Aurora, but her addiction presents major obstacles. This story focuses on the idea of love as something difficult to define. While the narrator hopes to have a normal relationship with Aurora, any semblance of normalcy is threatened by the characters' dangerous lifestyles.

=== "Aguantando" ===
Yunior tells a series of anecdotes about his time living in Santo Domingo and his anticipation to hear from his father, who has left for the United States.

=== "Drown" ===
This story describes the narrator's alienation from a friend visiting from college. He retraces the final summer they spent together and the sexual experiences they had that the narrator is confused by. Often times the audience is left feeling contempt for the main character finding themselves indifferent about his self inflicted state of decay.

=== "Boyfriend" ===
The story focuses on the narrator overhearing the ups and downs of a relationship between his two neighbors through the walls, and hoping to build up the courage to speak to the woman.

=== "Edison, New Jersey" ===
In Junot Diaz's "Edison," The text follows the day of a pool maintenance guy. It entails the process of his deliveries while serving wealthy people, all the while just recently getting out of a relationship with his ex. The narrator shares how through his deliveries, he would encounter all different types of people, those who are kind and others who stereotype and look down on the narrator and his coworker Wayne. In one specific delivery, the narrator and Wayne are ignored at the door and continue off with their work day. When returning to work, the narrator and Wayne learned that the unavailable client Pruitt was furious that his order was not delivered and quickly assumed the narrator and Wayne were delinquents. "The boss nearly kicked our asses over the Gold Crown. The customer, an asshole names Pruitt, called up crazy, we were delinquent. That's how the boss put it. Delinquent" (Diaz 129). The narrator shares the encounters and experiences he faces as a merchandise delivery boy, often being stereotyped for Wayne and his ethnic background as young criminals. Through this text, it can be seen the experiences that Diaz shares within the narrator's life, knowing and feeling the stereotype of his community, ethnicity, and background and living through that experience every day.

Alongside Pruitt was his guest, who ignored the narrator and Wayne when attempting their delivery. During their second attempt, both workers could finally enter and set up the ordered pool table. Through the narrator's encounter with the guest, the narrator decides to help Pruitt's guest and get her back home to New York. Throughout their interaction, it can be seen that the narrator expected "the girl" to have sexual relations with him. Although it was never discussed that her free ride came with a payment, the narrator assumed he could have sex with her anyway. This can be seen when the narrator takes one of Pruitt's condoms from his room before heading out to drop her off at home.

=== "How to Date a Browngirl, Blackgirl, Whitegirl, or Halfie" ===
The story takes the guise of an instructional manual, purporting to offer advice as to how to act or behave depending upon the ethnicity and social class of the reader’s date.

=== "No Face" ===
This story tells of Ysrael from his own perspective and his anticipation regarding facial reconstruction surgery by Canadian doctors.

=== "Negocios" ===
This story explains Yunior's father Ramon's arrival to the United States, first to Miami and then New York. Ramon struggles both financially and with the guilt of having left his family behind after he marries an American to obtain citizenship.

== Major themes ==
=== The American Dream ===
The book centers around an immigrant family from the Dominican Republic. First, Ramon comes to the United States searching for a better life for his family. He is often frustrated by how hard he works with little return and little wealth to show for it. Then, when his family joins him, they too try to find some balance between the American Dream and their reality. Ramon’s dream was to own his own business and provide for his family, which he achieves to a certain degree. But is doesn’t make him better or happier.

=== Community ===
In both Santo Domingo and in New York, Diaz portrays tight-knit communities that are bound together by heritage and social class.

=== Family ===
Drown is about a family that is forced to separate in order to immigrate to the U.S. and the strain that separation evokes as well as the irreparable damage their father creates by being unfaithful to his wife and abusive to his children.

=== Sexuality ===
Both Rafa and his father are with several women throughout the book and explore their sexuality outside of committed relationships. Yunior, however, struggles more with his sexuality and while he has a girlfriend at several points in the book, he also has a sexual experience with a man. In a conversation with Hilton Als, Junot explains that he is confounded by how little attention is paid to the homosexual experiences in this narrative when critics talk about the fictive world of Yunior De las Casas because it's fundamental to who he is as a character.

== Major characters ==
- Ramon de las Casas or “Yunior”- An immigrant from the Dominican Republic and often the main character and narrator of the stories.
- Rafa- Yunior’s older brother who he has a complicated and sometimes belligerent relationship with.
- Madai- The younger sister of Yunior and Rafa.
- Virta- Yunior’s mother and wife of Ramon. She is seen as very beautiful and works in a chocolate factory to provide for her children while Ramon is living in the U.S.
- Ramón- Father of Yunior, Rafa and Madai. Ramon leaves his family in Santo Domingo to travel to the U.S. and gain citizenship in order for them to join him. Though, once he arrives in U.S., he marries someone else and tries to forget about his family, he eventually brings them over. Ramon is seen often cheating on his wife and abusing his children.
- Nilda- Ramon’s wife whom he marries in the U.S. to gain citizenship.

== Reception ==
Drown was nominated for the 1997 Quality Paperback Book "New Voices award and "Ysrael and “Fiesta, 1980” were included in Best American Short Stories 1996 and 1997.

Gates writes of Díaz's characters: "Mainstream American literature from William Bradford to Toni Morrison has always been obsessed with outsiders; its Hucks and Holdens are forever duking it out with the King's English, and writers as different as Ezra Pound, Zora Neale Hurston and Donald Barthelme have delighted in defiling the pure well with highbrow imports, nonstandard vernacular and Rube Goldberg coinages. Despite his professed discomfort, Mr. Díaz is smart enough to play his hand for all it's worth." He also compares Díaz to Raymond Carver, writing: "Mr. Diaz transfigures disorder and disorientation with a rigorous sense of form. He whips story after story into shape by setting up parallel scenes."

The San Francisco Chronicle described Drown: "This stunning collection of stories offers an unsentimental glimpse of life among the immigrants from the Dominican Republic—and other front-line reports on the ambivalent promise of the American dream—by an eloquent and original writer who describes more than physical dislocation in conveying the price that is paid for leaving culture and homeland behind."
