= Punk Parranda =

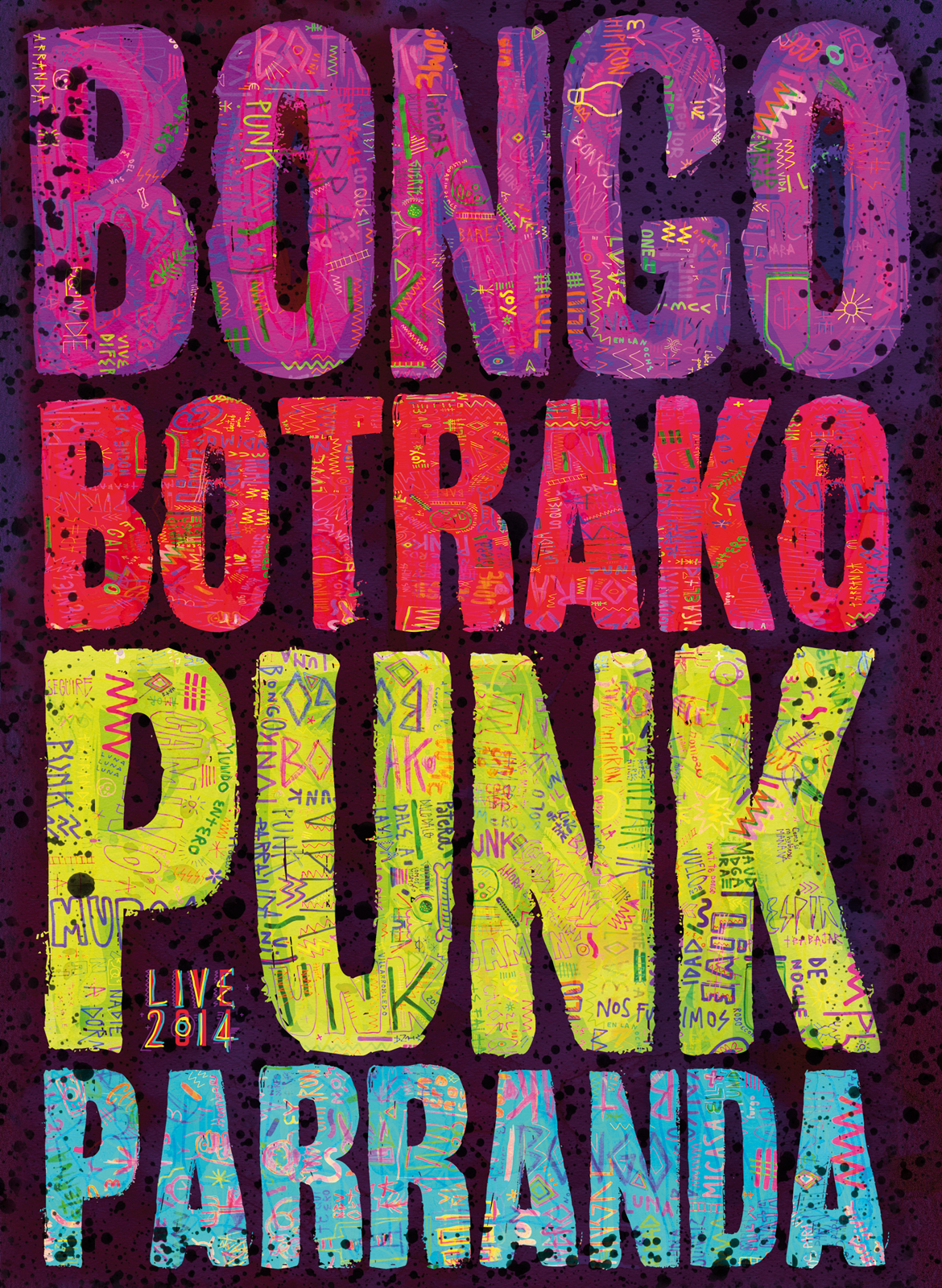

Live album by Bongo Botrako
- Released: November 3, 2014
- Recorded: May 2, 2014
- Venue: Viña Rock Festival in Villarrobledo, Spain
- Genre: Alternative rock; reggae rock; ska punk; reggae; ska
- Length: 70:18
- Label: Kasba Music
- Producer: Gambeat; Uri Giné

Bongo Botrako chronology
Revoltosa (2012)	Punk Parranda (2014)

Singles from Punk Parranda
- 1. "Mundo nuevo" Released: October 14, 2014

Punk Parranda (English: Punk Party) is the first live album by Spanish alternative rock band Bongo Botrako. It was recorded on May 2, 2014, at Viña Rock Festival in Villarrobledo, Spain, in front of a crowd of more than 60,000 people. The album was produced by Gambeat and lead vocalist Uri Giné, and was released on November 3, 2014, on Kasba Music.

== Track listing ==
All tracks are written by Uri Giné, except where noted.

No.	Title	Original album	Length
1.	"Intro"	Previously unreleased	2:20
2.	"Libre"	Todos los días sale el sol	2:59
3.	"Gira la vida"	Todos los días sale el sol	2:57
4.	"Dinero no se come"	Revoltosa	4:19
5.	"De bar en bar"	Todos los días sale el sol	3:58
6.	"Bastante normal"	Todos los días sale el sol	2:45
7.	"Caminante"	Todos los días sale el sol	3:52
8.	"Seguiré"	Revoltosa	4:03
9.	"Dale a la vida"	Revoltosa	3:59
10.	"Mundo nuevo"	Previously unreleased	4:18
11.	"Bonobo"	Todos los días sale el sol	2:39
12.	"We want less"	Revoltosa	3:46
13.	"Punk parranda"	Revoltosa	4:46
14.	"One love"	Todos los días sale el sol	4:20
15.	"Incívico"	Todos los días sale el sol	3:42
16.	"Give us your love"	Revoltosa	4:17
17.	"Volare" (Domenico Modugno, Franco Migliacci)	Previously unreleased	2:06
18.	"Todos los días sale el sol"	Todos los días sale el sol	4:33
19.	"Revoltosa"	Revoltosa	4:39
Total length:			70:18

== Personnel ==
Credits adapted from the liner notes of Punk Parranda.

Bongo Botrako

- Uri Giné – lead vocals, guitar, production
- Nacho Pascual – guitar, backing vocals
- Xavi Vallverdú – keyboard, backing vocals
- David Garcia – bass, backing vocals
- Gorka Robert – drums, backing vocals
- Xavi Barrero – trumpet, backing vocals
- Oscar Gómez – sax, backing vocals

Production

- Gambeat – production
- Kaki Arkarazo – engineering, mixing
- Jonan Ordorika – mastering

Design

- Luis Toledo – design
- Javier Rosa – photography
