= Junot Díaz =

Dominican-American writer and academic (born 1968)

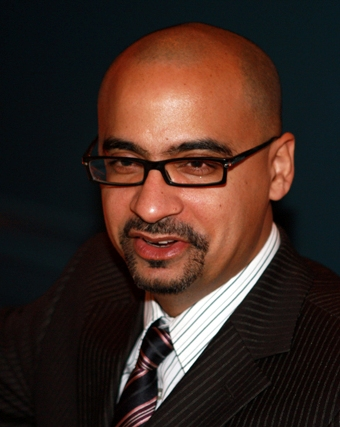
- Díaz in 2012
- Born: December 31, 1968 (age 57); Santo Domingo, Dominican Republic
- Education: Rutgers University, New Brunswick (BA); Cornell University (MFA)
- Occupations: Novelist; professor; writer
- Writing career
- Years active: 1995–present
- Notable awards: Guggenheim Fellowship (1999); National Book Critics Circle Award (2007); Pulitzer Prize (2008); MacArthur Fellowship (2012) Inducted into American Academy of Arts and Letters (2017)
- Movement: Afro-Surrealism
- Website: junotdiaz.com

Junot Díaz (/ˈdʒuːnoʊ/ JOO-noh; born December 31, 1968) is a Dominican American writer, creative writing professor at Massachusetts Institute of Technology, and a former fiction editor at Boston Review. Central to Díaz's work is the immigrant experience, particularly the Latino immigrant experience.

Born in Santo Domingo, Dominican Republic, Díaz migrated with his family to New Jersey when he was six years old. He earned a Bachelor of Arts degree from Rutgers University, and shortly after graduating created the character "Yunior", who served as narrator of several of his later books. After obtaining his MFA from Cornell University, Díaz published his first book, the 1995 short story collection Drown.

Diaz received the 2008 Pulitzer Prize for Fiction for his novel The Brief Wondrous Life of Oscar Wao, and received a MacArthur Fellowship "Genius Grant" in 2012.

== Early life ==
Díaz was born in Santo Domingo, Dominican Republic on December 31, 1968, to Rafael and Virtudes Díaz. He was the third child among seven siblings. Throughout most of his early childhood, he lived with his mother and grandparents while his father worked in the United States. In December 1974 he migrated to Parlin, New Jersey, where he was re-united with his father. There he lived less than a mile from what he has described as "one of the largest landfills in New Jersey".

Díaz attended Madison Park Elementary and was a voracious reader, often walking four miles to borrow books from his public library. At this time Díaz became fascinated with apocalyptic films and books, especially the work of John Christopher, the original Planet of the Apes films, and the BBC mini-series Edge of Darkness. Growing up, Diaz struggled greatly with learning the English language. He comments that it "was a miserable experience" for him, especially since it seemed that all of his other siblings "acquired the language in a matter of months; in some ways, it felt overnight". As his school took notice Diaz's family was contacted and he soon was placed in special education to provide him with more resources and opportunities to learn the language.

Díaz graduated from Cedar Ridge High School in 1987 (now called Old Bridge High School) in Old Bridge Township, New Jersey, though he would not begin to write formally until years later.

== Career ==
Díaz attended Kean College in Union, New Jersey, for one year before transferring and ultimately completing his BA at Rutgers University-New Brunswick in 1992, majoring in English; there he was involved in Demarest Hall, a creative-writing, living-learning, residence hall, and in various student organizations. He was exposed to the authors who would motivate him to become a writer: Toni Morrison and Sandra Cisneros. He worked his way through college by delivering pool tables, washing dishes, pumping gas, and working at Raritan River Steel. During an interview conducted in 2010, Díaz reflected on his experience growing up in America and working his way through college:

I can safely say I've seen the US from the bottom up ... I may be a success story as an individual. But if you adjust the knob and just take it back one setting to the family unit, I would say my family tells a much more complicated story. It tells the story of two kids in prison. It tells the story of enormous poverty, of tremendous difficulty.

A pervasive theme in his short story collection Drown (1996) is the absence of a father, which reflects Diaz's strained relationship with his own father, with whom he no longer keeps in contact. When Diaz once published an article in a Dominican newspaper condemning the country's treatment of Haitians, his father wrote a letter to the editor saying that the writer of the article should "go back home to Haiti".

After graduating from Rutgers, Díaz worked at Rutgers University Press as an editorial assistant. At this time he also first created the quasi-autobiographical character of Yunior in a story Díaz used as part of his application for his MFA program in the early 1990s. The character would become important to much of his later work including Drown and This Is How You Lose Her (2012). Yunior would become central to much of Diaz's work, Diaz later explaining how "My idea, ever since Drown, was to write six or seven books about him that would form one big novel". Díaz earned his MFA in 1995 from Cornell University, where he wrote most of his first collection of short stories.

Díaz joined the creative writing at Syracuse University as a faculty in 1997. He moved to MIT in 2002.

Díaz teaches creative writing at the Massachusetts Institute of Technology as the Rudge and Nancy Allen Professor of Writing and was the fiction editor for Boston Review. He is active in the Dominican American community and is a founding member of the Voices of Our Nation Arts Foundation, which focuses on writers of color. He was a Millet Writing Fellow at Wesleyan University, in 2009, and participated in Wesleyan's Distinguished Writers Series.

== Personal life ==
Díaz lives in a domestic partnership with paranormal romance writer Marjorie Liu in Cambridge, Massachusetts. Díaz is also a cousin of actor Manny Pérez.

== Work ==
=== 1994–2004: Early work and Drown ===
Díaz's short fiction has appeared in The New Yorker magazine, which listed him as one of the 20 top writers for the 21st century. He has been published in Story, The Paris Review, Enkare Review and in the anthologies The Best American Short Stories five times (1996, 1997, 1999, 2000, 2013), the PEN/O. Henry Prize Stories (2009), and African Voices. He is best known for his two major works: the short story collection Drown (1996) and the novel The Brief Wondrous Life of Oscar Wao (2007). Both were published to critical acclaim and he won the 2008 Pulitzer Prize for Fiction for the latter. Diaz himself has described his writing style as "a disobedient child of New Jersey and the Dominican Republic if that can be possibly imagined with way too much education".

Díaz has received a [Eugene McDermott] Award, a fellowship from the John Simon Guggenheim Memorial Foundation, a Lila Wallace Reader's Digest Writers Award, the 2002 PEN/Malamud Award, the 2003 US-Japan Creative Artist Fellowship from the National Endowment for the Arts, a fellowship at the Radcliffe Institute for Advanced Study at Harvard University and the Rome Prize from the American Academy of Arts and Letters. He was selected as one of the 39 most important Latin American writers under the age of 39 by the Bogotá World Book Capital and the Hay Festival.

The stories in Drown focus on the teenage narrator's impoverished, fatherless youth in the Dominican Republic and his struggle adapting to his new life in New Jersey. Reviews were generally strong but not without complaints. Díaz read twice for PRI's This American Life: "Edison, New Jersey" in 1997 and "How to Date a Brown Girl (Black Girl, White Girl, or Halfie)" in 1998. Díaz also published a Spanish translation of' Drown, entitled Negocios. The arrival of his novel (The Brief Wondrous Life of Oscar Wao) in 2007 prompted a noticeable re-appraisal of Díaz's earlier work. Drown became widely recognized as an important landmark in contemporary literature—ten years after its initial publication—even by critics who had either entirely ignored the book or had given it poor reviews.

=== 2005–11: The Brief Wondrous Life of Oscar Wao ===
The Brief Wondrous Life of Oscar Wao was published in September 2007. New York Times critic Michiko Kakutani characterized Díaz's writing in the novel as "a sort of streetwise brand of Spanglish that even the most monolingual reader can easily inhale: lots of flash words and razzle-dazzle talk, lots of body language on the sentences, lots of David Foster Wallace-esque footnotes and asides. And he conjures with seemingly effortless aplomb the two worlds his characters inhabit: the Dominican Republic, the ghost-haunted motherland that shapes their nightmares and their dreams; and America (a.k.a. New Jersey), the land of freedom and hope and not-so-shiny possibilities that they've fled to as part of the great Dominican diaspora. Díaz said about the protagonist of the novel, "Oscar was a composite of all the nerds that I grew up with who didn't have that special reservoir of masculine privilege. Oscar was who I would have been if it had not been for my father or my brother or my own willingness to fight or my own inability to fit into any category easily." He has said that he sees a meaningful and fitting connection between the science fiction and/or epic literary genres and the multi-faceted immigrant experience.

Writing for Time, critic Lev Grossman said that Díaz's novel was "so astoundingly great that in a fall crowded with heavyweights—Richard Russo, Philip Roth—Díaz is a good bet to run away with the field. You could call The Brief Wondrous Life of Oscar Wao ... the saga of an immigrant family, but that wouldn't really be fair. It's an immigrant-family saga for people who don't read immigrant-family sagas." In September 2007, Miramax acquired the rights for a film adaptation of The Brief Wondrous Life of Oscar Wao.

In addition to the Pulitzer, The Brief Wondrous life of Oscar Wao was awarded the John Sargent Sr. First Novel Prize, the National Book Critics Circle Award for Fiction of 2007 the Anisfield-Wolf Book Award, the 2008 Dayton Literary Peace Prize, the 2008 Hurston/Wright Legacy Award, and the Massachusetts Book Awards Fiction Award in 2007. Díaz also won the James Beard Foundation's MFK Fisher Distinguished Writing Award for his article "He'll Take El Alto", which appeared in Gourmet, September 2007. The novel was also selected by Time and New York Magazine as the best novel of 2007. The St. Louis Post-Dispatch, Los Angeles Times, Village Voice, Christian Science Monitor, New Statesman, Washington Post, and Publishers Weekly were among the 35 publications that placed the novel on their 'Best of 2007' lists. The novel was the subject of a panel at the 2008 Modern Language Association conference in San Francisco. Stanford University dedicated a symposium to Junot Díaz in 2012, with roundtables of leading US Latino/a Studies scholars commenting on his creative writing and activism.

In February 2010, Díaz's contributions toward encouraging fellow writers were recognized when he was awarded the Barnes & Noble Writers for Writers Award, alongside Maxine Hong Kingston and poet M.L. Liebler.

=== 2012–present: This Is How You Lose Her and other works ===
In September 2012, he released a collection of short stories entitled This Is How You Lose Her. The collection was named a finalist for the 2012 National Book Award on October 10, 2012. In his review of the book on online arts and culture journal Frontier Psychiatrist, editor-in-chief Keith Meatto wrote: "While This Is How You Lose Her will surely advance Diaz's literary career, it may complicate his love life. For the reader, the collection raises the obvious question of what you would do if your lover cheated on you, and implies two no less challenging questions: How do you find love and how do you make it last?"

One reviewer wrote, "The stories in This Is How You Lose Her, by turns hilarious and devastating, raucous and tender, lay bare the infinite longing and inevitable weaknesses of our all-too-human hearts. They capture the heat of new passion, the recklessness with which we betray what we most treasure, and the torture we go through – "the begging, the crawling over glass, the crying" – to try to mend what we've broken beyond repair. They recall the echoes that intimacy leaves behind, even where we thought we did not care ... Most of all, these stories remind us that the habit of passion always triumphs over experience, and that "love, when it hits us for real, has a half-life of forever".

In 2012, Diaz received a $500,000 MacArthur "Genius grant" award. He said "I think I was speechless for two days" and called it "stupendous" and a "mind-blowing honor".

After Oscar Wao, Diaz began work on a second novel, a science-fiction epic with the working title Monstro. Diaz had previously attempted to write a science fiction novel twice prior to Oscar Wao, with earlier efforts in the genre "Shadow of the Adept, a far-future novel in the vein of Gene Wolfe's The Shadow of the Torturer, and Dark America, an Akira-inspired post-apocalyptic nightmare" remaining incomplete and unpublished. Part of the appeal of science fiction to Diaz, he explained in an interview with Wired, is that science fiction grapples with the idea of power in a manner other genres do not: "I didn't see mainstream, literary, realistic fiction talking about power, talking about dictatorship, talking about the consequences of breeding people, which of course is something that in the Caribbean is never far away." In an interview with New York Magazine prior to the release of This Is How You Lose Her, Diaz revealed that the work-in-progress novel concerns "a 14-year-old 'Dominican York' girl who saves the planet from a full-blown apocalypse". but he also warned that the novel may never be completed: "I'm only at the first part of the novel, so I haven't really gotten down to the eating," he says, "and I've got to eat a couple cities before I think the thing will really get going." As of June 2015, the novel-in-progress appears to be abandoned – in a June 2015 interview for Words on a Wire, when asked about his progress on Monstro, Diaz said "Yeah, I'm not writing that book anymore ..."

Diaz's first children's book, Islandborn, was published March 13, 2018. The story follows an Afro-Latina girl named Lola whose journey takes her back to collect memories of her country of origin, Dominican Republic.

In 2023 and 2024, two of his short stories appeared in The New Yorker: "The Ghosts of Gloria Lara" (2023) and "The Books of Losing You" (2024).

With regard to his own writing, Diaz has said: "There are two types of writers: those who write for other writers, and those who write for readers," and that he prefers to keep his readers in mind when writing, as they'll be more likely to gloss over his mistakes and act as willing participants in a story, rather than actively looking to criticize his writing.

A poll of US critics in January 2015 named Díaz's The Brief Wondrous Life of Oscar Wao as "the best novel of the 21st century to date." In February 2017, Diaz was formally inducted into the American Academy of Arts and Letters.

== Activism and advocacy ==
Díaz has been active in a number of community organizations in New York City, from Pro-Libertad, to the Communist Dominican Workers' Party (Partido de los Trabajadores Dominicanos), and the Unión de Jóvenes Dominicanos ("Dominican Youth Union"). He has been critical of immigration policy in the United States. With fellow author Edwidge Danticat, Díaz published an op-ed piece in The New York Times condemning the Dominican government's deportation of Haitians and Haitian Dominicans.

In response to Díaz's criticism, the Consul General of the Dominican Republic in New York called Díaz an "anti-Dominican" and revoked the Order of Merit he had been awarded by the Dominican Republic in 2009.

On May 22, 2010, it was announced that Díaz had been selected to sit on the 20-member Pulitzer Prize board of jurors. Díaz described his appointment, and the fact that he is the first of Latin background to be appointed to the panel, as an "extraordinary honor".

As of September 2014, he is the honorary chairman of the DREAM Project, a non-profit education involvement program in the Dominican Republic.

== Allegations of abusive behavior ==
In May 2018, the author Zinzi Clemmons publicly confronted Díaz, alleging that he had once forcibly cornered and kissed her. Other women, including the writers Carmen Maria Machado and Monica Byrne, responded on Twitter with their own accounts of "belittling" and condescension by Díaz. The author Alisa Valdes wrote a blog post alleging "misogynistic abuse" on the part of Díaz some years prior; she said that she had been rebuked for attacking a fellow Latino author when she had called attention to Díaz's behavior in the past.

Literary and feminist circles were divided between supporters of Díaz and his accusers. The issue of how sexual-harassment claims might be handled differently depending on the race or ethnicity of the accused provoked particular controversy. Several weeks before Clemmons made her allegations, Díaz had published an essay in The New Yorker, recounting his own experience of being raped at the age of eight, along with its effect on his later life and relationships. He addressed the essay to a reader who had once asked him if he had been abused, writing that the childhood abuse he experienced led him to hurt others in later life. While the essay was widely praised as honest and courageous, others accused Díaz of trying to defuse allegations about his own behavior.

The author Rebecca Walker, along with a group of academics, including educators from Harvard and Stanford universities, protested the media response to the accusations in an open letter to The Chronicle of Higher Education, saying it amounted to "a full-blown media-harassment campaign." While not dismissing the allegations, they cautioned against an "uncritical" and "sensationalist" handling of the issue that they said could reinforce stereotypes of Black people and Latinos as sexual predators. Linda Martín Alcoff, a professor of philosophy at Hunter College, wrote an essay in The New York Times placing allegations of sexual assault such as those against Díaz within a larger political context, writing of the need "to develop critiques of the conventions of sexual behavior that produce systemic sexual abuse".

MIT, where Díaz teaches creative writing, later announced that their investigation had not revealed any evidence of wrongdoing. The editors of Boston Review also announced that Díaz would stay on at the magazine, writing that the allegations lacked "the kind of severity that animated the #MeToo movement". Both decisions were criticized; the magazine's poetry editors resigned in protest. One of the Boston Review editors has since written in detail about their investigation into the allegations regarding Díaz and their decision to retain him as fiction editor.

Following an initial statement in which he wrote of taking "responsibility for my past", Díaz later denied having inappropriately kissed Clemmons; he stated that "people had already moved on to the punishment phase" and that he doubted his denial would be believed at first. The Boston Globe later described the case as a "turning point" in public response to the Me Too movement, largely because Díaz faced less institutional backlash than other prominent male figures who had been accused of sexual misconduct and "the deluge of #MeToo stories his accusers predicted" did not materialize. Díaz voluntarily resigned as chair of the Pulitzer Prize board soon after the allegations were made public. After a five-month review by an independent law firm, the board announced it "did not find evidence warranting removal of Professor Diaz". It also discovered that the forcible kiss alleged by Clemmons had been a kiss on the cheek, a detail which Ben Smith wrote was "decisive" for the Pulitzer board. He has since been welcomed back onto the board of the Pulitzer prize.

== Bibliography ==
=== Novels ===
- The Brief Wondrous Life of Oscar Wao. New York: Riverhead. 2007. ISBN 9781594489587.

=== Short story collections ===
- Drown. New York: Riverhead. 1996. ISBN 9781573220415.
- This Is How You Lose Her. New York: Riverhead. 2012. ISBN 9781594487361.

=== Children's books ===
- Islandborn. New York: Dial Press. 2018. ISBN 9780735229860.

=== Essays ===
- "Homecoming, with Turtle" (The New Yorker, June 14, 2004)
- "Summer Love, Overheated" (GQ, April 2008)
- "One Year: Storyteller-in-Chief" (The New Yorker, January 20, 2010)
- "Apocalypse: What Disasters Reveal" (Boston Review, May/June 2011)
- "MFA vs. POC" (The New Yorker, April 30, 2014)
- "The Silence: The Legacy of Childhood Trauma" (The New Yorker, April 16, 2018)

=== Speculative fiction ===
- "Monstro". Latinx Rising. The Ohio State University Press. 2020.

== Awards and nominations ==
=== Honors ===
- 2002: PEN/Malamud Award
- 2008: Fellow of the American Academy Rome Prize
- 2011: The Nicolas Guillen Philosophical Literature Prize, Caribbean Philosophical Association
- 2012: MacArthur Fellowship
- 2013: Honorary Doctorate (Doctor of Letters), Brown University
- 2013: Norman Mailer Prize (Distinguished Writing)
- 2017: Inducted into the American Academy of Arts and Letters

=== Awards ===
- 2007: Center for Fiction First Novel Prize for The Brief Wondrous Life of Oscar Wao
- 2007: Los Angeles Times Book Prize (Fiction) finalist for The Brief Wondrous Life of Oscar Wao
- 2007: National Book Critics Circle Award for The Brief Wondrous Life of Oscar Wao
- 2007: Salon Book Award for The Brief Wondrous Life of Oscar Wao
- 2008: Anisfield-Wolf Book Award (Fiction) for The Brief Wondrous Life of Oscar Wao
- 2008: Dayton Literary Peace Prize (Fiction) for The Brief Wondrous Life of Oscar Wao
- 2008: Pulitzer Prize for Fiction for The Brief Wondrous Life of Oscar Wao
- 2009: International Dublin Literary Award shortlist for The Brief Wondrous Life of Oscar Wao
- 2012: Goodreads Choice Awards, Best Fiction, finalist, This Is How You Lose Her
- 2012: National Book Award, finalist, This Is How You Lose Her
- 2012: The Story Prize, finalist, This Is How You Lose Her
- 2013: Andrew Carnegie Medal for Excellence in Fiction finalist (Fiction) for This Is How You Lose Her
- 2013: Frank O'Connor International Short Story Award longlist for This Is How You Lose Her
- 2013: Sunday Times EFG Private Bank Short Story Award, winner, "Miss Lora" from This Is How You Lose Her

=== Other lit distinctions ===
- 2012: Kansas City Star Top 100 Books, This Is How You Lose Her
- 2012: New York Times 100 Notable Books, This Is How You Lose Her
- 2012: Publishers Weekly Best Books, This Is How You Lose Her

== See also ==
- Dominican-Americans in Boston
- Latino literature
- Weird fiction
- American literature
- Caribbean literature
- Speculative fiction
