= How to Date a Brown Girl (Black Girl, White Girl, or Halfie) =

- Short story by Junot Díaz
- Country: United States
- Language: English
- Genres: Satire, short story

Publication
- Published in: The New Yorker, Drown
- Publication date: December 25th, 1996

"How to Date a Brown Girl (Black Girl, White Girl, or Halfie)" is a satirical short story by Junot Díaz. The story takes the guise of an instructional manual, purporting to offer advice as to how to act or behave depending upon the ethnicity and social class of the reader’s date.

== Plot summary ==
Diaz’s dating guide for the Dominican American teenage male takes on the authority of experience by employing a narrator speaking in second person. The story is centered around a young teenage boy giving instructions about readiness for a date. Starting off with removing obvious signs of Dominican "ghetto" culture such as the "government cheese", then to approaching the female depending on whether or not she is an "insider" or "outsider". As the story progresses you see how the narrators words and mannerisms change according to the race of the female. These observations determine his speech and physical approach to them. The narrator constantly shifts descriptions of both the women and the male's ethnicities and social class to where it is very difficult to determine exactly what type of person is speaking or to whom.

== Analysis ==
The narrator's style is said to "undercut both individuality and objectivity" by pointing out the different ways to court women or to hide your particular ethnicity. Diaz is not afraid to include small gestures that reveal cultural attitudes, even if these attitudes do not put Dominicans in the best light. When the narrator hides his origin when he gets rid of the Dominican "artifacts" in his apartment. He also recollects on his mother’s experiences of the tear gas from when the Americans invaded the "island". He also recommends running a hand through your hair like "the white boys do". Also stereotypical machismo can be seen through this piece as Diaz writes about the narrator’s attitude towards women. However overall, the narrator never allows for all the potential outcomes of the date to outstrip that there is a date to begin with.

As Diaz himself admits, much of his work is thinly veiled autobiography. His work is definitely fiction, however, and not to be seen as accurately portraying his own life. His life serves as literary inspiration, but he freely embellishes and changes characters, settings, and events. Díaz has commented on his story, saying "the issue is, is that these tendencies are deeply rooted in our community and that even though there's plenty of people who are not held by these tendencies, there's plenty of people who do not feel compelled to pursue these kind of craziness".

== Character(s) ==
The narrator is assumed to be a teenage chamaco living in an urban area. He is trying to win the hearts of local girls. However, because of his upbringing and his culture, he knows he has to hide his identity in order to please a white girl or a halfie. Multiple dimensions of his character are brought out by race.

== Publication ==
How to Date a Brown Girl (Black Girl, White Girl, or Halfie) was first published in the December 1995 issue of The New Yorker. The short story was reprinted in the short story anthology Drown in 1996. Díaz read the story for an episode of the radio show, This American Life, which aired on February 27, 1998.
