= Bongo Botrako =

Spanish rock band

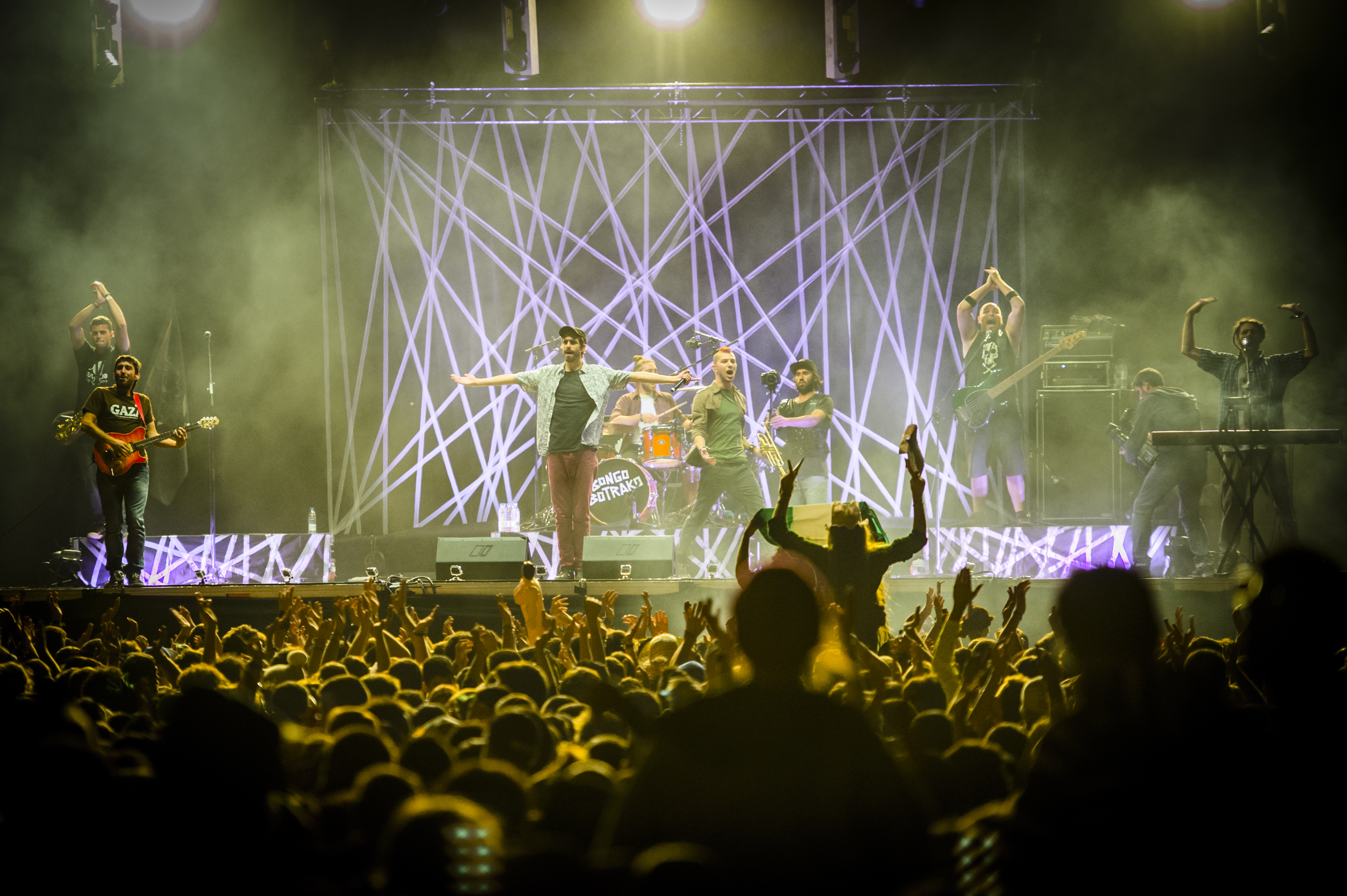
- Bongo Botrako performing at Viña Rock Festival in Spain in May 2014. From left to right: Oscar Gómez, Nacho Pascual, Uri Giné, Gorka Robert, Xavi Barrero, David Garcia and Xavi Vallverdú.

Background information
- Origin: Tarragona, Spain
- Genres: Alternative rock; reggae rock; ska punk; reggae; ska
- Years active: 2007–2015 (on hiatus)
- Label: Kasba Music
- Members: Uri Giné; Nacho Pascual; Xavi Vallverdú; Gorka Robert; Xavi Barrero; Oscar Gómez; David Garcia
- Past members: Marc Vallverdú; Mercè Verge; Xavi Artiol; Àlex Huguet; Pitus Siles; Juanhito Sáez; Xavi Latorre
- Website: bongobotrako.com

Bongo Botrako is a Spanish alternative rock band formed in Tarragona, Spain, in 2007 by lead vocalist and songwriter Uri Giné. The band released their first studio album, Todos los días sale el sol, in 2010; it featured their most notable hit, "Todos los días sale el sol" (also known as "Chipirón"), which peaked at #12 on the Spain Songs chart. In 2012, they released their second studio album, Revoltosa, leading to extensive tours across eleven European countries.

The band's first and only live album, Punk Parranda, was released in 2014. In October 2015, Bongo Botrako announced an indefinite hiatus and a six-date farewell tour, performing their last concert on December 26, 2015.

== History ==
=== Early years (2007–2009) ===
Bongo Botrako frontman Uri Giné joined the punk rock band Extracto de Lúpulo as its guitarist, backing vocalist and songwriter in 2003. Some of the songs he wrote didn't fit in the genre of the band, so he kept them apart. In October 2007, Giné decided to create his own band with all those songs and named it Bongo Botrako. He recorded a ten-track demo at his small home studio, programming the drums and performing all the rest of instruments himself. After passing the demo around, Giné quickly recruited eight more musicians: Nacho Pascual on guitar, Xavi Vallverdú on keyboard, Marc Vallverdú on bass, Gorka Robert on drums, Pitus Siles on percussion, Xavi Artiol on trumpet, Àlex Huguet on trombone and Mercè Verge on backing vocals. They started rehearsing in January 2008 and they performed live for the first time on March 20, 2008 in their hometown, Tarragona.

There were some line-up changes in 2008 and early 2009: Mercè Verge left the band, Xavi Latorre replaced Pitus Siles on percussion, Xavi Barrero replaced Xavi Artiol on trumpet, Juanhito Saez replaced Àlex Huguet on trombone and Oscar Gómez joined the band as saxophonist.

In February and March 2009, the band recorded a self-produced seven-track demo, called La maketa, in their rehearsal space. A few days before the expected release date for the demo, Uri Giné wrote the song "Todos los días sale el sol" while being in Granada, Spain. 500 CD copies of the demo were already being produced at that moment, so they had no time to include the new song. The demo La maketa was released on May 5, 2009 and the band sold the CD copies in their concerts. The song "Todos los días sale el sol" was premiered live in Lleida, Spain on May 7, 2009 and it became an instant success in every concert of their catalan tour, despite not being included in the demo.

Uri Giné left Extracto de Lúpulo on September 24, 2009 to focus entirely on Bongo Botrako. After almost two years running both bands at the same time, Bongo Botrako had become way more successful than Extracto de Lúpulo and many gigs started to coincide, so Giné felt the need to make the move.

In late 2009, there were some more line-up changes that finally set the current line-up: Juanhito Saez and Xavi Latorre left the band, and David Garcia replaced Marc Vallverdú on bass.

=== Todos los días sale el sol (2010–2011) ===
As a result of the buzz created by the song "Todos los días sale el sol", the band caught the attention of Joni Sahún, an A&R rep for the independent record label Kasba Music. They recorded their debut album Todos los días sale el sol in La Atlántida Studio in Barcelona and released it on September 27, 2010 in Spain on Kasba Music. The album was later also released in France, Germany, United Kingdom, Belgium, Netherlands, Luxembourg and Japan.

The band's first headline tour started in October 2010 and took them to many sold-out indoor venues across Spain. During spring and summer of 2011, they played well-received sets at festivals in Spain and France which helped add to their growing fanbase.

Bongo Botrako released the music video for the album's first single "Todos los días sale el sol" on June 23, 2011. The song became very popular in Spain after the men's national basketball team, including Pau Gasol, Marc Gasol and Ricky Rubio, took the habit of singing it before every game in the EuroBasket 2011 Championship, which they eventually won. In September 2011, "Todos los días sale el sol" peaked at #12 on the Spain Songs chart and #2 on the iTunes Spain Songs chart. The song accumulates more than 31 million streamings on YouTube and more than 31 million streamings on Spotify, which ultimately makes it Bongo Botrako's most popular song by far.

In October 2011, after attending a live show, Germán Quimasó of Sonde3 Producciones became the band's manager, a role that Uri Giné had played until then.

=== Revoltosa (2012–2013) ===
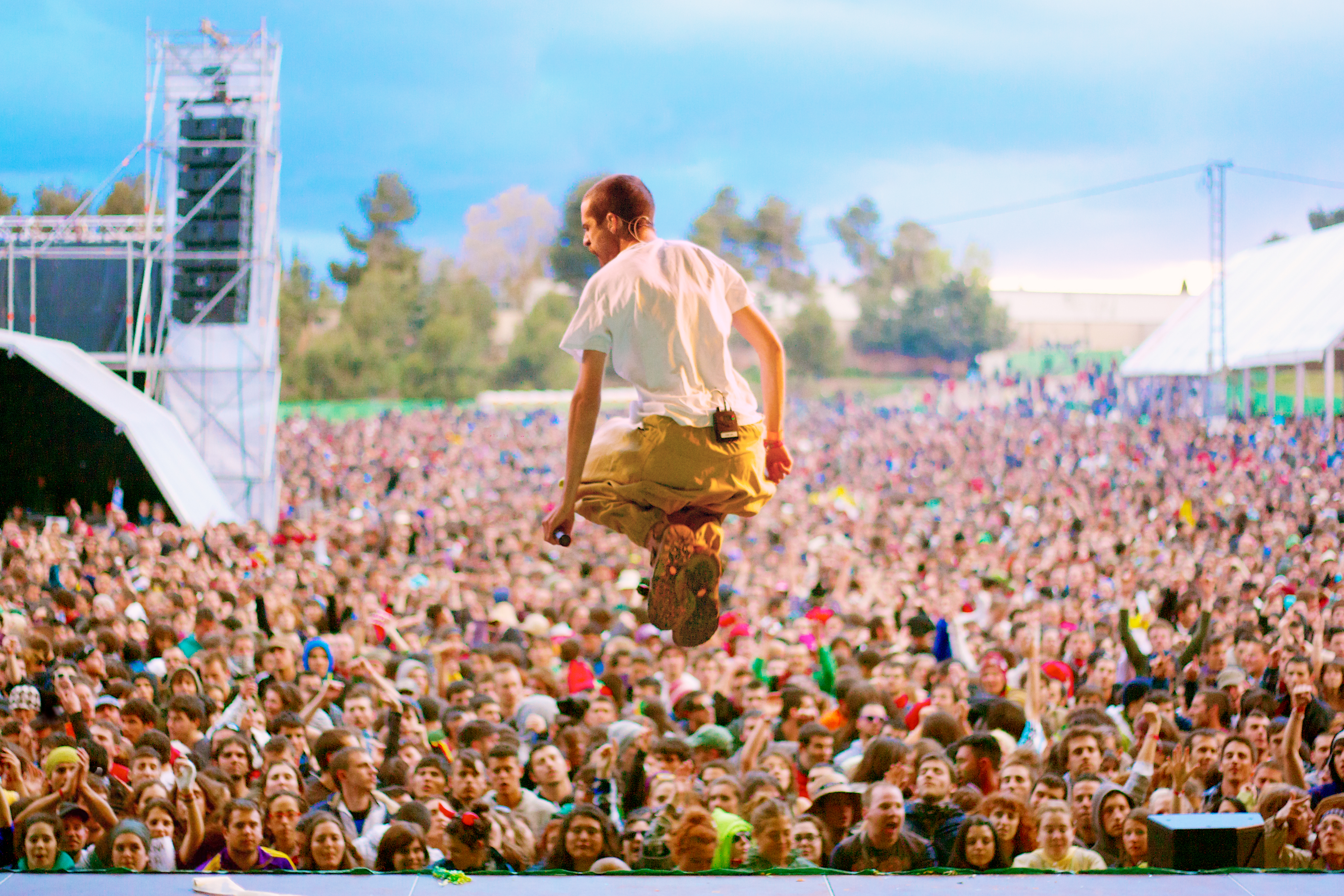
Uri Giné performing with Bongo Botrako at Viña Rock Festival 2012 in Spain.

The band's second studio album, Revoltosa, was recorded in Garate Studios in Andoain, Spain and produced by Spanish musician Amparo Sánchez, also known as Amparanoia. It was released on November 12, 2012 in Spain, France, Germany, United Kingdom, Belgium, Netherlands, Luxembourg and Japan on Kasba Music.

The music video for the album's first single "Revoltosa" was released on November 15, 2012 amid controversy surrounding the appearance of riot police officers having fun while using brutal violence against a crowd of peaceful protesters. Uri Giné explained that they wanted to denounce police brutality and noted that they used sarcasm, satire and humour because they thought it would attract more attention on the issue than showing realistic images, since people is overexposed to this kind of images.

During 2012 and 2013, the band embarked on an extensive tour that took them to France, Italy, Netherlands, Austria, Andorra, Belgium and Switzerland. They also became a frequent act in the line-up of Spanish major festivals such as Viña Rock or Arenal Sound.

=== Punk Parranda and hiatus announcement (2014–2015) ===
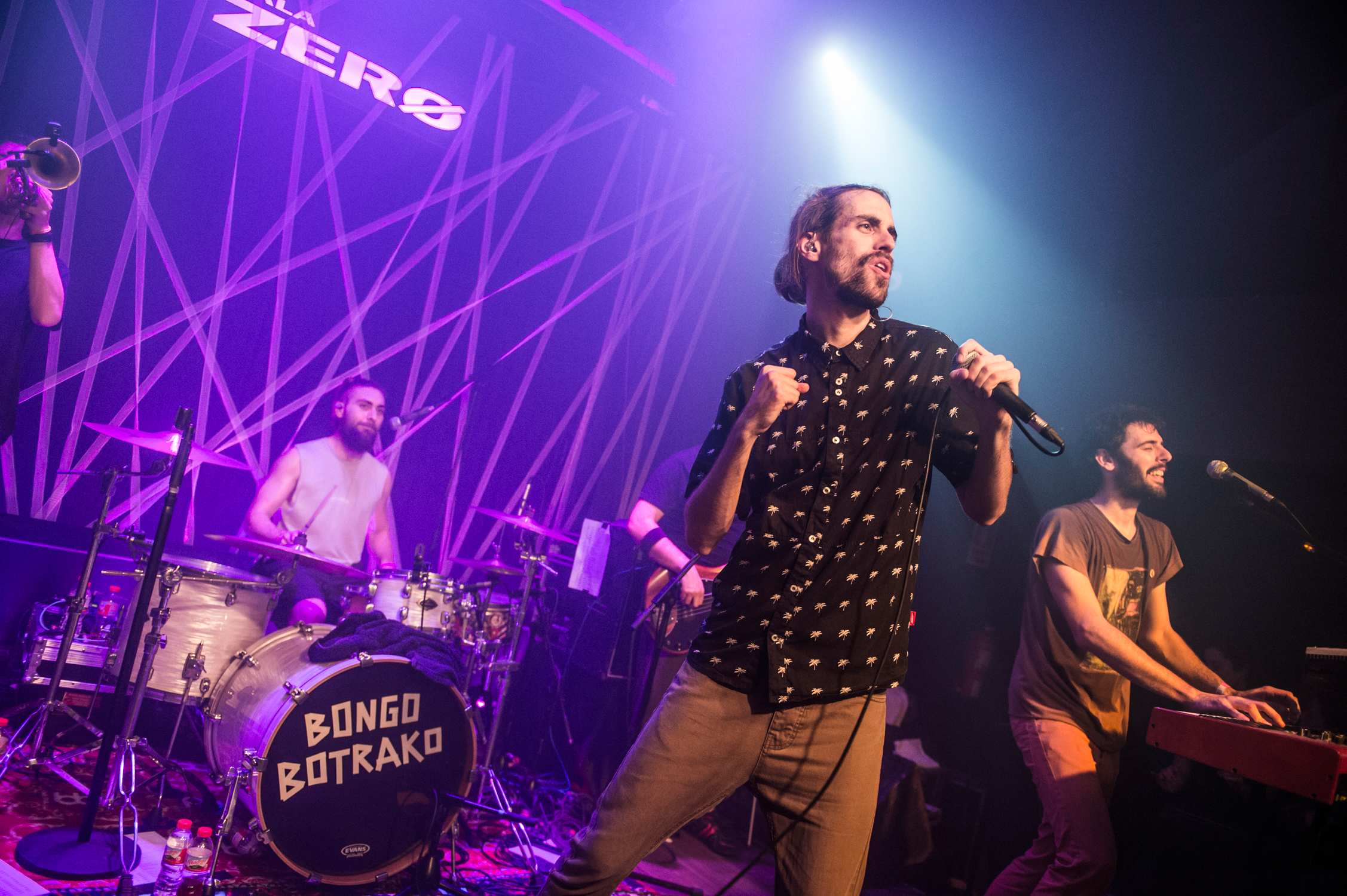
Bongo Botrako performing their last concert before the hiatus.

The band's first and only live album, Punk Parranda, was released on November 3, 2014 on Kasba Music. They recorded it performing to a crowd of more than 60,000 people at Viña Rock Festival on May 2, 2014 in Villarrobledo, Spain.

During 2014 and 2015, the band continued touring Europe and visited France, Italy, Netherlands, Austria, Andorra, United Kingdom, Germany and Czech Republic. They reached particular success in the Netherlands, where they played a sold-out indoor tour and some major festivals such as Lowlands 2014, Parkpop 2015 and Zwarte Cross 2015.

On October 13, 2015, Bongo Botrako announced an indefinite hiatus and a six-date farewell tour in a statement via their official website:

"With this release we Bongo Botrako announce that we’ve decided to stop. It’s been eight years now since we started, quite a while. Eight years of joy, of good friends, of incredible collaborations, of exhausting travels, of wild parties and also of some wounds. But above all it’s been eight years we wouldn’t change for anything in this world. And now it’s time to breathe. Because the path enriches the heart but it’s also a weight for it. And we don’t want to continue if it’s not with the same enthusiasm of the first day. We don’t know if it’s a see you later or a goodbye, time will tell." – Bongo Botrako

Uri Giné explained that he felt exhausted after eight years of non-stop touring and noted that the band had lost the enthusiasm. However, he said he would continue to write songs and he left the door open to create a new music project in the future. Bongo Botrako performed their last and 500th concert in Giné's hometown Tarragona on December 26, 2015.

== Musical style ==
Giné has often proclaimed the band's music as "punk parranda", which translates as "punk party". He explains that it's not a very accurate label but he likes it because it comprises the punk soul, understood as social activism and fast-paced songs, and the festive tone, characterized by positive messages and danceable rhythms.

Bongo Botrako has been described as alternative rock, reggae rock, ska punk, reggae and ska. Many people have also labeled their music as catalan rumba, but they have tried to distance themselves from this label claiming that they have only released three rumba-classifiable songs, all of them in their first album. The band has been known for radically transforming some of their songs when played live, often delivering fast-paced and hard-eged live versions from originally slower and quieter songs.

Bongo Botrako's sound has been compared to Mano Negra, The Clash, Bob Marley and Kortatu. Indeed, current Manu Chao's Radio Bemba bassist Gambeat produced the band's live shows from 2011 to 2015.

== Activism ==
Bongo Botrako has spoken out against animal torture and police brutality. They support Amnesty International and performed two benefit shows for them in Barcelona, in 2012 and 2013. They also included an Amnesty International quote in the music video for their song "Revoltosa" in 2012.

== Members ==
=== Current members ===
- Uri Giné – lead vocals, guitar (2007–2015)
- Nacho Pascual – guitar, backing vocals (2008–2015)
- Xavi Vallverdú – keyboard, backing vocals (2008–2015)
- David Garcia – bass, backing vocals (2009–2015)
- Gorka Robert – drums, backing vocals (2008–2015)
- Xavi Barrero – trumpet, backing vocals (2008–2015)
- Oscar Gómez – sax, backing vocals (2009–2015)

=== Former members ===
- Marc Vallverdú – bass (2008–2009)
- Pitus Siles – percussion (2008)
- Xavi Latorre – percussion (2008–2009)
- Xavi Artiol – trumpet (2008)
- Àlex Huguet – trombone (2008–2009)
- Juanhito Sáez – trombone (2008–2009)
- Mercè Verge – backing vocals (2008)

== Discography ==
=== Studio albums ===
- Todos los días sale el sol (2010)
- Revoltosa (2012)

=== Live albums ===
- Punk Parranda (2014)

== Awards ==
Bongo Botrako won the Catalan Bookers Association Award for "Best Indoor Tour" in 2013 and the Enderrock Award for "Best Band in Foreign Language" in 2014.
