= Uri Giné =

Spanish musician, singer and songwriter (born 1986)

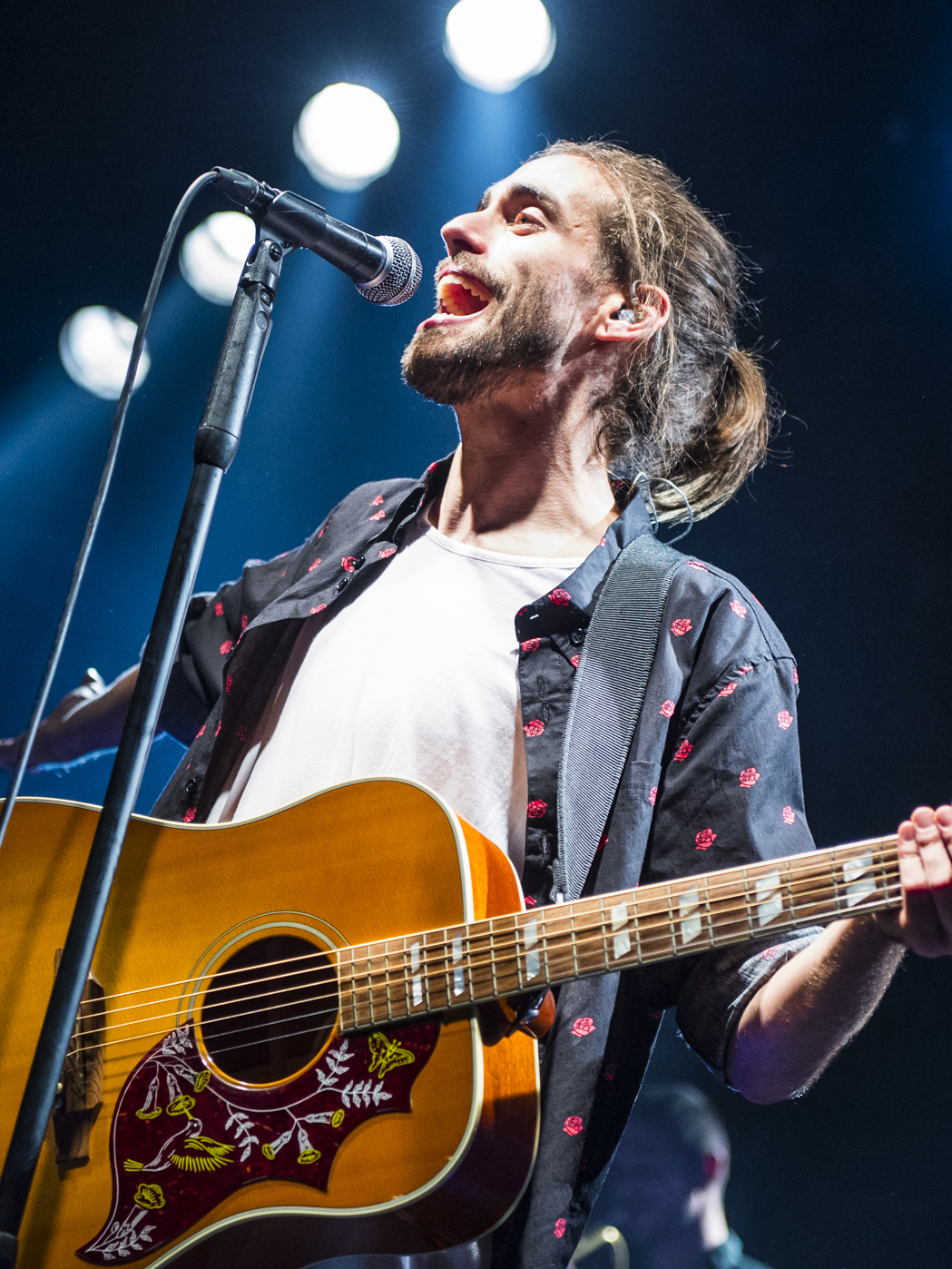
- Uri Giné in 2015

Background information
- Born: Oriol Giné de Lera; August 24, 1986 (age 39); Tarragona, Spain
- Genres: Alternative rock; reggae rock; ska punk
- Occupations: Musician; singer; songwriter
- Instruments: Vocals; guitar
- Years active: 2003–present
- Label: Kasba Music

Uri Giné (Catalan pronunciation: [ˈuɾi ʒiˈne]; born Oriol Giné de Lera; August 24, 1986) is a Spanish musician, singer, and songwriter. He is best known as the founder, lead singer, and songwriter of the alternative rock band Bongo Botrako from their formation in 2007 until their indefinite hiatus announcement in 2015.

== Early life ==
Giné, the second of three children, was born and raised in Tarragona, Spain, a city just south of Barcelona. His mother, Maria José de Lera, is a nurse, and his father, Josep Giné, is a retired software developer. His younger sister, Alba, died at only ten months old from a heart malfunction, when Giné was 3. Some of his songs focus on the loss of his sister.

Giné grew up listening to his older sister, Celia, practise the piano for hours daily, but even though she and his parents tried to encourage him to play an instrument since he was young, he was reluctant for many years. At the age of 13, Celia gave him a cassette of a friend's punk rock band and he was so fascinated that he bought an electric guitar and started learning to play it and sing. He taught himself imitating rock, grunge and punk rock bands such as Nirvana, The Offspring, Red Hot Chili Peppers and Extremoduro.

Giné attended Pompeu Fabra University in Barcelona, but after four years taking classes in Audiovisual Communication, he dropped out to focus entirely on his musical career.

== Career ==
=== Extracto de Lúpulo (2003–2009) ===
Giné joined punk rock band Extracto de Lúpulo in 2003 while in high school. He wrote his first songs for this band but he soon realised that some of the songs he wrote didn't fit in the genre, so he kept them apart. In late 2007, Giné decided to create his own band with all those songs and named it Bongo Botrako. In 2008 Giné recorded Extracto de Lúpulo's first album, El agua pa los peces, which was released in the following year. However, after almost two years running both bands at the same time, Bongo Botrako had become way more successful than Extracto de Lúpulo and many gigs started to coincide, so in 2009 Giné left Extracto de Lúpulo to focus entirely on Bongo Botrako.

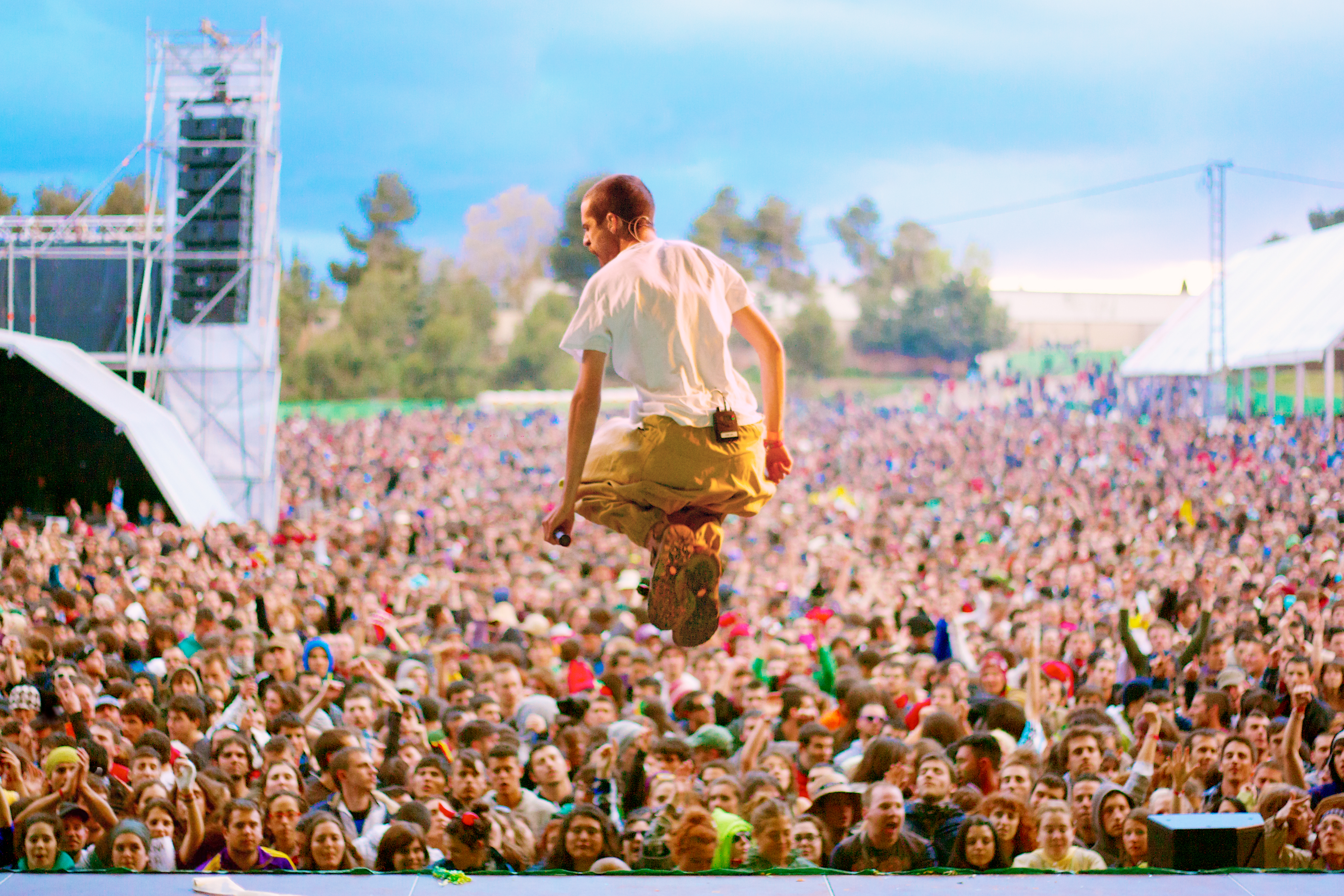
Uri Giné performing with Bongo Botrako at Viña Rock Festival 2012.

=== Bongo Botrako (2007–2015) ===
In October 2007, Giné recorded a ten-track demo titled Bongo Botrako at his small home studio. He programmed the drums and performed all the rest of instruments himself. After passing the demo around, Giné quickly recruited eight more musicians and they started performing live in March 2008.

Giné wrote the song "Todos los días sale el sol" (also known as "Chipirón") in 2010 as part of Bongo Botrako's first album, Todos los días sale el sol, which was released on September 27, 2010. The song became very popular in Spain after the men's national basketball team players, including Pau Gasol, Marc Gasol and Ricky Rubio, took the habit of singing it before every game in the EuroBasket 2011 Championship, which they eventually won. In September 2011, "Todos los días sale el sol" peaked at No. 12 on the Spain Songs chart and No. 2 on the iTunes Spain Songs chart. The song accumulates more than 31 million streamings on YouTube and more than 31 million streamings on Spotify, which ultimately makes it Giné's most popular song by far.

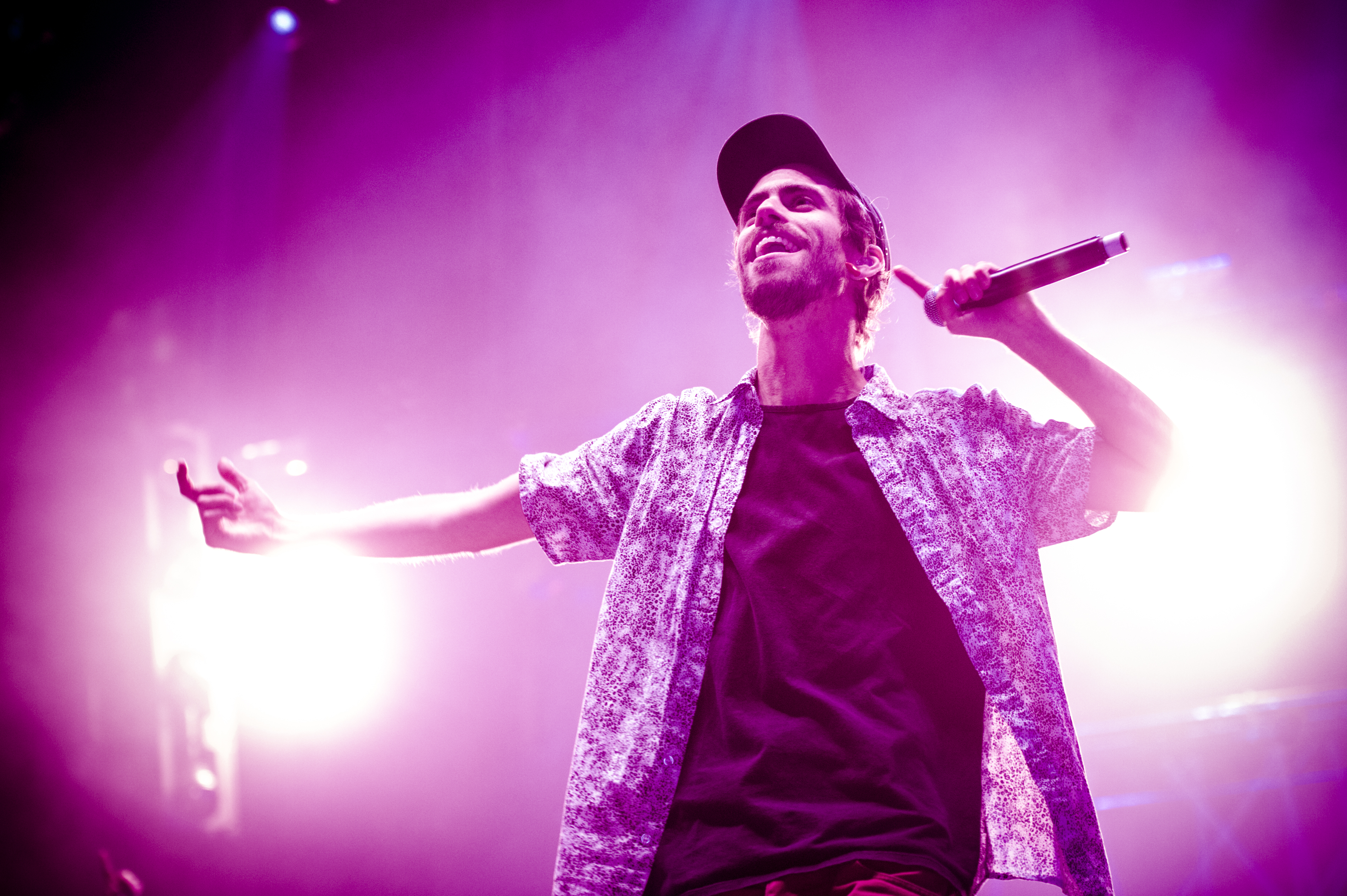
Uri Giné performing with Bongo Botrako at Viña Rock Festival 2014.

The band's second studio album, Revoltosa, was released on November 12, 2012. Giné and his bandmates embarked on an extensive tour that took them to eleven European countries, reaching particular success in the Netherlands, where they played at major festivals such as Lowlands 2014, Parkpop 2015 and Zwarte Cross 2015.

The band's first and only live album, Punk Parranda, was released on November 3, 2014. They recorded it performing to a crowd of more than 60,000 people at Viña Rock Festival 2014 in Villarrobledo, Spain.

On October 13, 2015, Bongo Botrako announced an indefinite hiatus and a six-date farewell tour. Giné explained that he felt exhausted after eight years of non-stop touring and noted that the band had lost the enthusiasm. However, he said he would continue to write songs and he left the door open to create a new music project in the future. Bongo Botrako performed their last and 500th concert in Giné's hometown Tarragona on December 26, 2015.

== Personal life ==
Giné has been an active supporter of human rights movements throughout his career as a musician. In 2012 and 2013, he performed two Amnesty International benefit shows in Barcelona. He also included an Amnesty International quote in the music video for Bongo Botrako's song "Revoltosa" in 2012.

In May 2016, Giné took an Accelerated Freefall training to become a solo skydiver. When he's not touring or songwriting, some of his main occupations are travelling, photography and skydiving.

== Discography ==
=== Extracto de Lúpulo ===
- El agua pa los peces (2009) – guitar, vocals

=== Bongo Botrako ===
- Todos los días sale el sol (2010) – lead vocals
- Revoltosa (2012) – lead vocals
- Punk Parranda (2014) – lead vocals, guitar
