= Islandborn =

2018 children's book

Islandborn is the first children's book by Dominican-American author and Pulitzer Prize-winner Junot Díaz. With illustrations by Leo Espinosa, who was born in Colombia, the picture-book features Dominican girls living in the Bronx, much like Díaz's goddaughters to whom he had long promised a children's book. The protagonist, Lola, who immigrated when she was six years old, does not remember the Dominican Republic, and sets out to fill in her missing memories. The 48-page work was published by Dial Books for Young Readers on March 13, 2018.

== Critical reception ==
In The Chicago Tribune, Nara Schoenberg reviewed Islandborn as a "pitch-perfect children's book", noting Díaz's "humor, vivid detail and an authentic kid’s-eye view" as well as the "enticing mixed-media illustrations that bring Lola’s candy-colored world to life, infusing it with myth and magic."
