= Yunior de Las Casas =

- First appearance: Drown
- Created by: Junot Díaz

In-universe information
- Gender: Male
- Family: Virta de Las Casas (mother); Ramón de las Casas (father); Rafa de Las Casas (brother)

Yunior de Las Casas is a fictional character and the subject of two short story collections by author Junot Díaz entitled Drown in 1996 and This Is How You Lose Her in 2012. Yunior was also the main narrator in Diaz's first novel The Brief Wondrous Life of Oscar Wao in 2007.

== Inception ==
Yunior came to life by the pen of Junot Díaz in 1991. He states that Yunior was the subject of a short story that was used as his piece to get into Cornell University. Díaz has also stated that with Yunior, the idea was to be able to get out six or seven books about Yunior that would form a novel. Díaz writes about the immigrant experience from Santo Domingo, Dominican Republic to the industrial background of New Jersey. Front and center for all the exploration of this theme as well as race, masculinity, and sex is Yunior, the alter-ego of Junot Díaz.

== In Other Media ==
In the off-broadway adaptation The Brief Wondrous Life of Oscar Wao that premiered in 2019 at Spanish Repertory Theatre, Yunior is played by Dominican actor Mario Peguero. The play is still part of the theater's repertoire and they have performances scheduled until December 2023.
