= This Is How You Lose Her =

2012 short story collection by Junot Díaz

- Author: Junot Díaz
- Cover artist: Rodrigo Corral
- Language: English
- Genre: Short story collection
- Publisher: Riverhead Books
- Publication date: September 11, 2012
- Publication place: United States
- Media type: Print (hardcover)
- Pages: 224
- ISBN: 978-1-101-59695-1

This Is How You Lose Her is the second collection of short stories by Junot Díaz. It is the third of Díaz's books to feature his recurring protagonist Yunior, following his 1996 short story collection, Drown and his 2007 novel, The Brief Wondrous Life of Oscar Wao. The collection is composed of nine interlinked short stories.

== Contents ==
Story	Originally published in
"The Sun, The Moon, The Stars"	The New Yorker
"Nilda"	The New Yorker
"Alma"	The New Yorker
"Otravida, Otravez"	The New Yorker
"Flaca"	Story
"The Pura Principle"	The New Yorker
"Invierno"	Original
"Miss Lora"	The New Yorker
"The Cheater’s Guide to Love"	The New Yorker

== Synopsis ==
=== "The Sun, The Moon, The Stars" ===
This story was included in The Best American Short Stories 1999. It traces Yunior taking Magdalena on a vacation to Santo Domingo in an unsuccessful effort to salvage their relationship.

=== "Nilda" ===
This story was included in The Best American Short Stories 2000. Like in "The Pura Principle," the title character of "Nilda" is the girlfriend of Yunior's brother, Rafa. The basis of Nilda and Yunior's relationship is that she spends the night at Yunior and Rafa's house largely to avoid her drunken mother and Yunior develops a friendship with her as they talk together waiting for Rafa to get home at night. Nilda also dreams of opening a group home for runaway kids.

=== "Alma" ===
This story was originally published in the 24 December 2007 edition of The New Yorker and is the shortest story in the collection. A key sentence from this story is the source of the collection's title. Yunior has been dating the title character for eight months and the story takes place as she had opened his journal to learn that Yunior was cheating on her with another girl. Alma waits for him to publicly ridicule and dump him.

=== "Otravida, Otravez" ===
This is an exception to the other stories in the collection as it is told from the perspective of an immigrant woman who works at a laundromat. She is the woman with whom Yunior's father, Ramon, builds a relationship with leaving the Dominican Republic. In conversation with Hilton Als, Junot calls it a foundational story, and an alternative to the narrative "Negocios," found in Drown.

=== "Flaca" ===
The title character is named Veronica Hardrada from Paterson, New Jersey and she meets Yunior in a James Joyce class in college. Despite their intentions, the two enter into a serious relationship that lasts two years.

=== "The Pura Principle" ===
This story is told from the first-person perspective of Yunior and begins: "Those last months. No way of wrapping it pretty or pretending otherwise: Rafa estaba jodido." The story recalls Rafa's battle with leukemia and his subsequent relationship with Pura, whom he eventually marries, which strains Rafa's relationship with Mami and Yunior. Eventually Rafa and Pura move out and Mami allows Rafa to take money from her, pretending she does not know otherwise.

=== "Invierno" ===
This story has been described as "the collection's most subtly devastating story, unfurls an exquisite, threadbare tapestry of alienation. Yunior, along with his mother and older brother, Rafa, has just arrived in New Jersey from Santo Domingo, relocated by the father he barely knows." Papi has been working in the U.S. for five years, while Yunior, Rafa, and Mami have waited in Santo Domingo. It traces Yunior's family having difficulty learning English, Papi working days at a time without coming home, Mami being depressed, housebound, and missing Santo Domingo, and Yunior and Rafa trying to find familiarity in school and with their neighbors. It closes with a scene involving snowflakes scattering across Yunior's cold, hard scalp.

=== "Miss Lora" ===
In this story, "a teenage Yunior ponders his emergent lust in the context of Papi and Rafa’s rutting ways." Miss Lora is a middle-aged woman and one of Yunior's neighbors. He has a sexual relationship with her and she eventually becomes a substitute teacher at his high school. "Miss Lora" was included in The Best American Short Stories 2013 and won the 2013 Sunday Times EFG Short Story Award. Díaz also described this story as being the "absolute easiest" to write in the collection.

=== "The Cheater’s Guide to Love" ===
This story spans five years and traces Yunior's initial break-up and his subsequent relationships of varying lengths. Díaz establishes a parallel between Yunior's love life and the marriage of his friend, Elvis, an Iraq War veteran. It begins, "Your girl catches you cheating. (Well, actually she's your fiancé, but hey, in a bit it so won't matter.) She could have caught you with one sucia, she could have caught you with two, but as you're a totally bat shit cuero who didn't ever empty his e-mail trash can, she caught you with fifty! Sure, over a six-year period, but still. Fifty fucking girls? Goddamn."

== Themes ==
The majority of the stories in the collection deal with men's infidelity in romantic relationships. Díaz describes the book as being "a tale about a young man’s struggle to overcome his cultural training and inner habits in order to create lasting relationships... [By the end of the book,] he finally begins to see the women in his life as fully human. He finally gains, after much suffering, a true human imaginary. Something that for the average guy is very difficult to obtain, considering that most of us are socialized to never imagine women as fully human."

== Reception ==
The collection received positive reviews from publications including The New York Times, which describes the collection: "In the new book, as previously, Díaz is almost too good for his own good. His prose style is so irresistible, so sheerly entertaining, it risks blinding readers to its larger offerings. Yet he weds form so ideally to content that instead of blinding us, it becomes the very lens through which we can see the joy and suffering of the signature Díaz subject: what it means to belong to a diaspora, to live out the possibilities and ambiguities of perpetual insider/outsider status."

The Telegraph notes of the collection: "Junot Díaz's short story collection is so sharp, so bawdy, so raw with emotion, and so steeped in the lingo and rhythms of working-class Latino life that it makes most writing that crosses the Atlantic seem hopelessly desiccated by comparison" and "Language is key. Díaz is both a minimalist—scraping, chiselling, honing his prose into its flinty essence—and a maximalist who's capable of code switching, flipping between the colloquial and the highbrow, creating a taut lexical calabash made up of Caribbean phrases, black American vernacular and the playful pugilism of urban street banter."

Virginia Vitzthum, writing in Elle, praised Díaz's prose, but criticized his representations of female characters, writing that "we pretty much only see the women as exes, crying and screaming after they've been cheated on, or as new possibilities, cataloged in terms of their fuckworthiness."

This Is How You Lose Her was a finalist for the National Book Award for Fiction (2012), and the Andrew Carnegie Medal for Excellence in Fiction (2013).
