= Todos los días sale el sol =

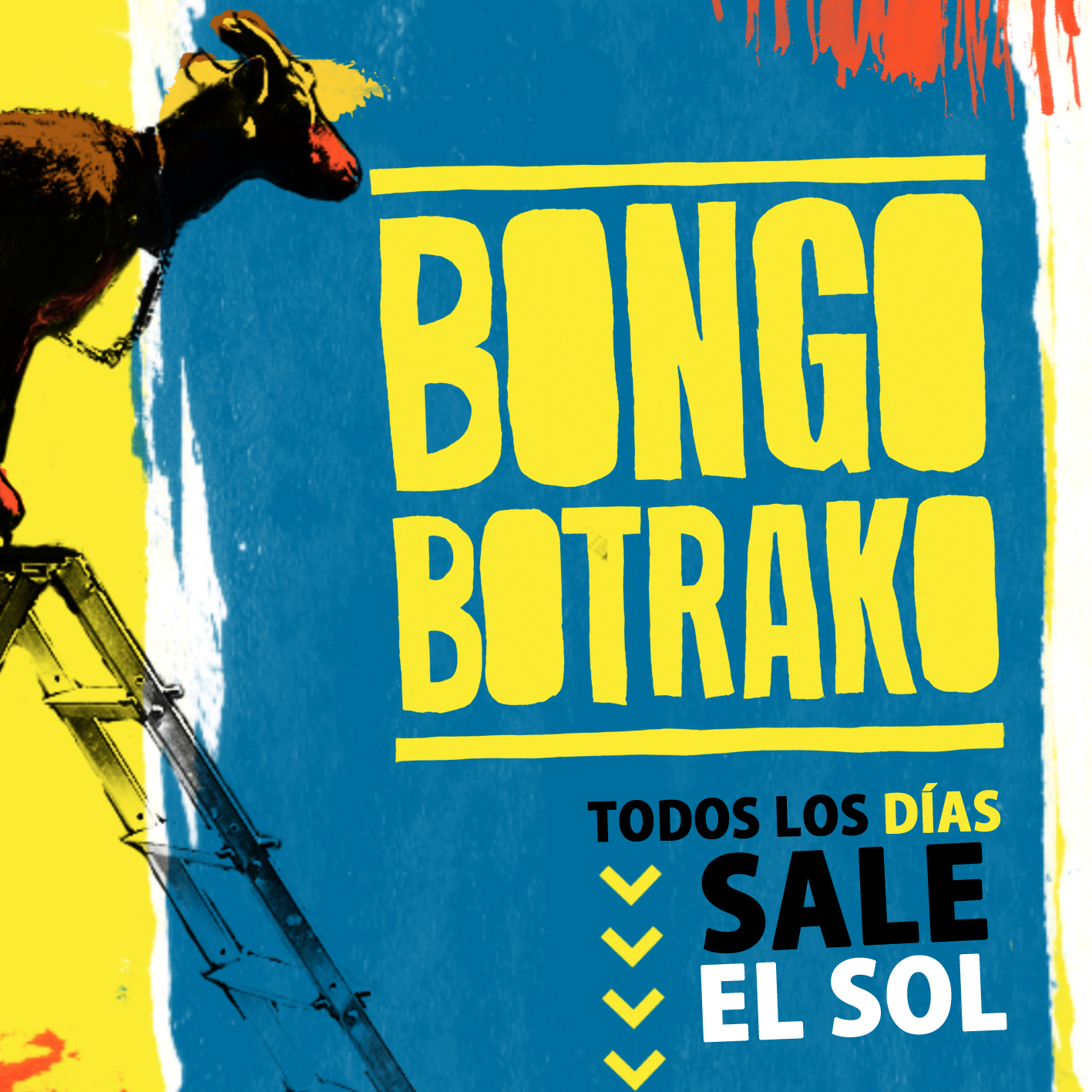

Studio album by Bongo Botrako
- Released: September 27, 2010
- Recorded: April–June 2010
- Studio: La Atlántida Studio in Barcelona, Spain
- Genre: Alternative rock; reggae rock; ska punk; reggae; ska
- Length: 37:50
- Label: Kasba Music
- Producer: Mario Patiño; Uri Giné

Bongo Botrako chronology
Todos los días sale el sol (2010)	Revoltosa (2012)

Singles from Todos los días sale el sol
- 1. "Todos los días sale el sol" Released: June 18, 2010; 2. "Caminante" Released: April 30, 2012

Todos los días sale el sol (English: The sun rises every day) is the debut studio album by Spanish alternative rock band Bongo Botrako. It was produced by Mario Patiño and lead vocalist Uri Giné, and was released in Spain on September 27, 2010, on Kasba Music. The album features the most notable hit of the band, "Todos los días sale el sol" (also known as "Chipirón"), which peaked at No. 12 on the Spain Songs chart. Todos los días sale el sol was later also released in France, Germany, United Kingdom, Belgium, Netherlands, Luxembourg and Japan.

== Track listing ==
All tracks are written by Uri Giné, except where noted

No.	Title	Length
1.	"Todos los días sale el sol"	2:26
2.	"Llegará la primavera"	2:47
3.	"Gira la vida"	2:49
4.	"Caminante"	3:14
5.	"Bonobo"	2:33
6.	"La plaça de la alegría"	2:55
7.	"Libre"	3:18
8.	"Incívico"	2:53
9.	"La mancha" (Nacho Pascual)	2:56
10.	"De bar en bar"	3:32
11.	"Tanto con tan poco"	3:21
12.	"One love"	3:32
13.	"Bastante normal"	1:34
Total length:		37:50

== Personnel ==
Credits adapted from the liner notes of Todos los días sale el sol.

Bongo Botrako

- Uri Giné – vocals, production
- Nacho Pascual – guitar
- Xavi Vallverdú – keyboard
- David Garcia – bass
- Gorka Robert – drums, percussion
- Xavi Barrero – trumpet
- Oscar Gómez – sax

Additional musicians

- Rubén Sierra – vocals (track 1)
- Adrià Salas – vocals (track 1)
- José Capel – vocals (track 4)
- Leo Fernández – vocals (track 8)
- Meri López – vocals (track 11)
- El Bravo – guitar (track 11)
- Romain Renard – accordion (tracks 6, 7)
- Sergi López – percussion (tracks 6, 11)

Production

- Mario Patiño – production, engineering, mixing
- Edgar Beltri – additional engineering
- Yves Roussel – mastering

Design

- Cristina Pastrana – design
