= Revoltosa =

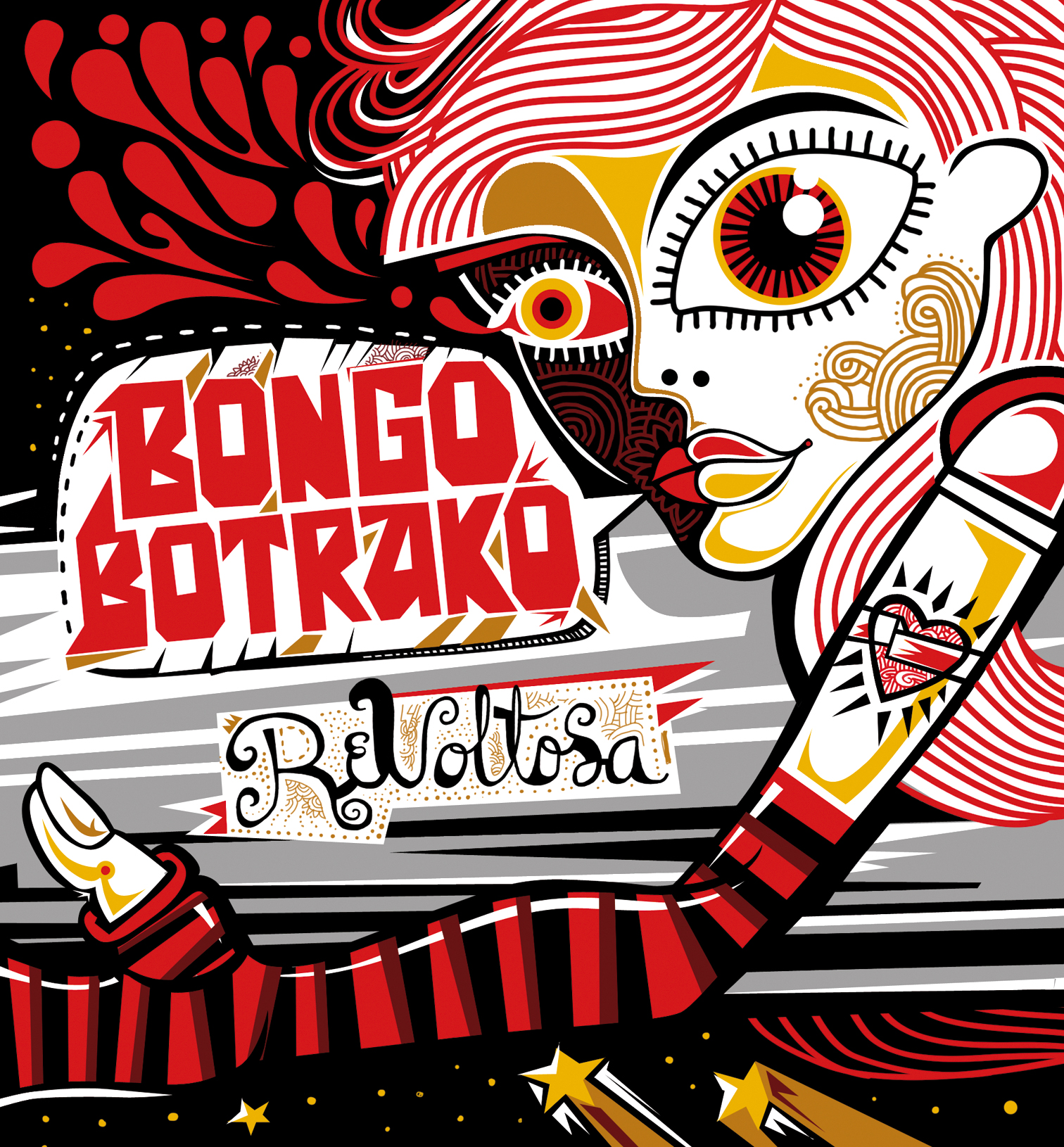

Studio album by Bongo Botrako
- Released: November 12, 2012
- Recorded: August–October 2012
- Studio: Garate Studios in Andoain, Spain
- Genre: Alternative rock; reggae rock; reggae; ska
- Length: 41:47
- Label: Kasba Music
- Producer: Amparo Sánchez; Uri Giné

Bongo Botrako chronology
Todos los días sale el sol (2010)	Revoltosa (2012)	Punk Parranda (2014)

Singles from Revoltosa
- 1. "Revoltosa" Released: October 29, 2012

Revoltosa (English: Rebellious) is the second studio album by Spanish alternative rock band Bongo Botrako, produced by Amparo Sánchez and lead vocalist Uri Giné. It was released on November 12, 2012, in Spain, France, Germany, United Kingdom, Belgium, Netherlands, Luxembourg and Japan on Kasba Music.

== Track listing ==
All tracks are written by Uri Giné, except where noted.

No.	Title	Length
1.	"Intro"	1:04
2.	"Revoltosa"	2:47
3.	"Give us your love"	3:12
4.	"Dinero no se come"	3:51
5.	"We want less"	2:47
6.	"Punk parranda"	3:36
7.	"Dale a la vida"	3:24
8.	"Invierno" (Amparo Sánchez)	3:28
9.	"Coge el vuelo"	3:46
10.	"Contra-intro"	1:26
11.	"Respirar pa trabajar"	3:50
12.	"Seguiré"	3:46
13.	"Lluna"	4:50
Total length:		41:47

== Personnel ==
Credits adapted from the liner notes of Revoltosa.

Bongo Botrako

- Uri Giné – vocals, production
- Nacho Pascual – guitar
- Xavi Vallverdú – keyboard
- David Garcia – bass
- Gorka Robert – drums, percussion
- Xavi Barrero – trumpet
- Oscar Gómez – sax

Additional musicians

- Benjammin – vocals (track 3)
- Anita Kuruba – vocals (track 7)
- Chiki Lora – vocals (track 7)
- Amparo Sánchez – vocals (tracks 8,12)
- Joan Garriga – vocals (track 13)
- Jordi Mestres – guitar, bass
- Gerard Casajús – percussion
- Jose Alberto Varona – trumpet

Production

- Amparo Sánchez – production
- Gerard Casajús – additional pre-production
- Kaki Arkarazo – engineering, mixing, mastering

Design

- Robertiko Ramos – design, illustration
