= Parranda (dance) =

Traditional Spanish dance

The parranda is a traditional Spanish dance that originated from the Region of Murcia, the eastern areas of Almería, and the southeastern areas of Albacete in the 18th century. It is a dance similar to the seguidilla, and is usually characterized by its usage of extraordinary jumps and turns in the air.

== Etymology ==
According to the Diccionario de la lengua española, the origin of the word parranda is similar to that of a "group of musicians who come out at night to play music and dance" and a "boisterous spree, especially one that is done from one place to another". The variety of parranda native to the county in the northwest region of Murcia and to the populations of the Sierra de Segura de Albacete is called the pardica.

== Origin ==
The Region of Murcia in Spain is one of the birthplaces of the parranda

The parranda originated from seguidilla, an old Castilian form of folk music and dance, during the 18th century, within the Region of Murcia, as well as the eastern areas of Almería (Los Vélez, Levante Almeriense and Valle de Almanzora) and the southeastern areas of Albacete (Campos de Hellín and Sierra de Segura) in the 18th century.

== Characteristics ==
=== Music ===
A parranda is formed by three couplets paired with three verses. Its structure is similar to the beginning, ending, return, couplets and ending structure of a seguidilla. The melody is diatonic and syllabic. It has a ternary rhythm, and a tonal harmony and is played in major key. The three types of parranda are solo, trio, and campo.

The dance is often accompanied by Murcian castanets or pitos (finger snapping). The instruments used for this variety of music are guitars, guitarros, violins, and bandurrias (similar to Spanish lutes).

=== Dance ===
The parranda is usually danced by two people, like the seguidilla, but it is distinct from the seguidilla in its usage of extraordinary jumps and turns in the air. At the beginning of the dance, two rows are made, leaving the pairs in front. In its basic structure, it begins with some lateral steps and then the dancers cross with their partner and turn themselves around. However, there are many varieties of steps and turns that are characteristic to each town or community.

The parranda is danced chiefly outdoors.
