= Todos los días sale el sol (song) =

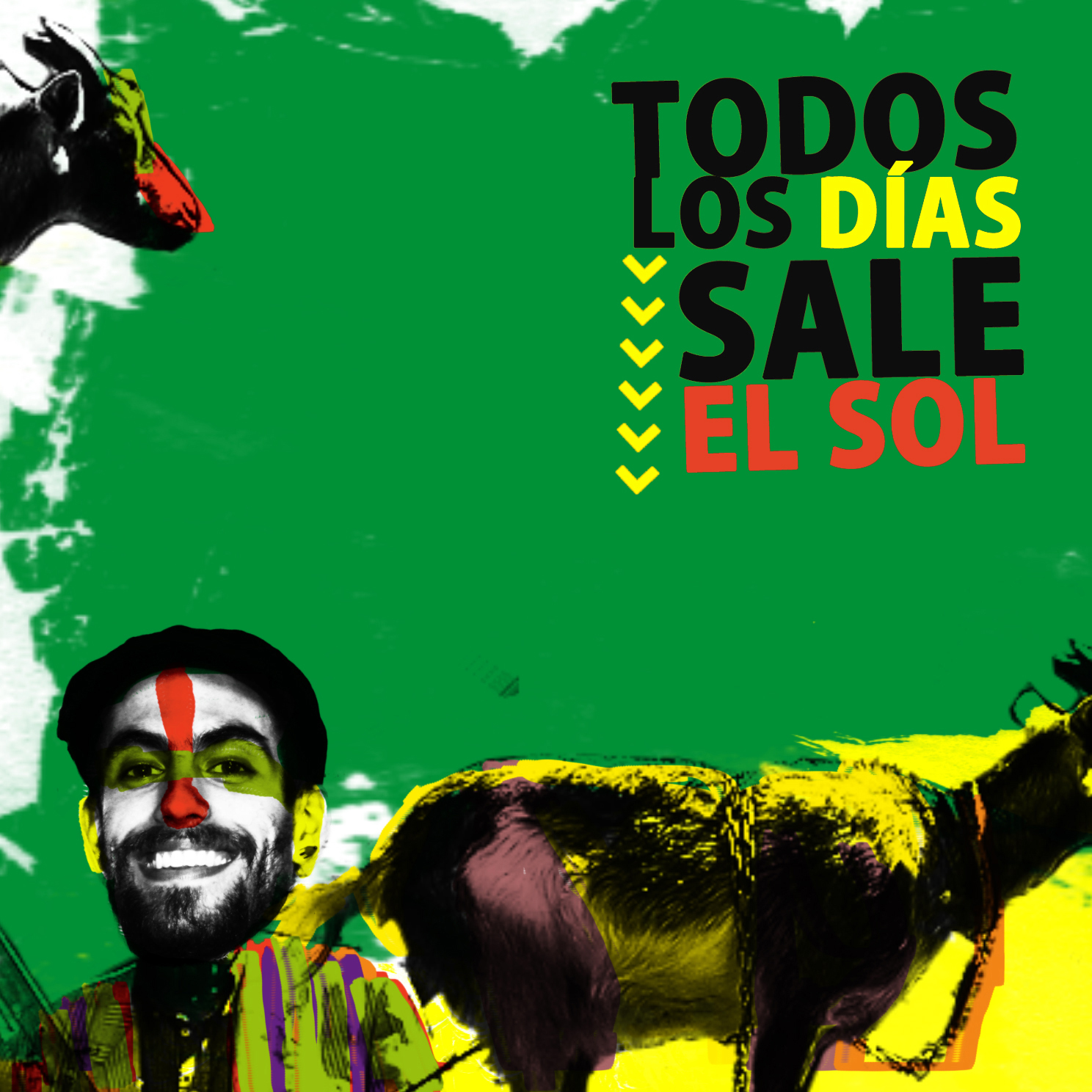

Single by Bongo Botrako

from the album Todos los días sale el sol
- Released: 18 June 2010
- Recorded: April–June 2010 at La Atlántida Studio in Barcelona, Spain
- Genre: Ska; rock
- Length: 2:26
- Label: Kasba Music
- Songwriter(s): Uri Giné
- Producer(s): Mario Patiño; Uri Giné

Bongo Botrako singles chronology
"Todos los días sale el sol" (2010)	"Caminante" (2012)

Music video
- "Todos los días sale el sol" on YouTube

"Todos los días sale el sol", (English: "The sun rises every day"), also known as "Chipirón", is a song by Spanish alternative rock band Bongo Botrako, written by lead vocalist Uri Giné and featuring uncredited vocals by Spanish band La Pegatina. It was recorded by the band for their 2010 debut studio album Todos los días sale el sol and was released as the album's first single on 18 June 2010.

The song became very popular in Spain after the men's national basketball team players, including Pau Gasol, Marc Gasol and Ricky Rubio, took the habit of singing it before every game in the EuroBasket 2011 Championship, which they eventually won. In September 2011, "Todos los días sale el sol" peaked at No. 12 on the Spain Songs chart and No. 2 on the iTunes Spain Songs chart. The song accumulates more than 31 million streamings on YouTube and more than 31 million streamings on Spotify, which ultimately makes it Bongo Botrako's most popular song by far.

== Inspiration ==
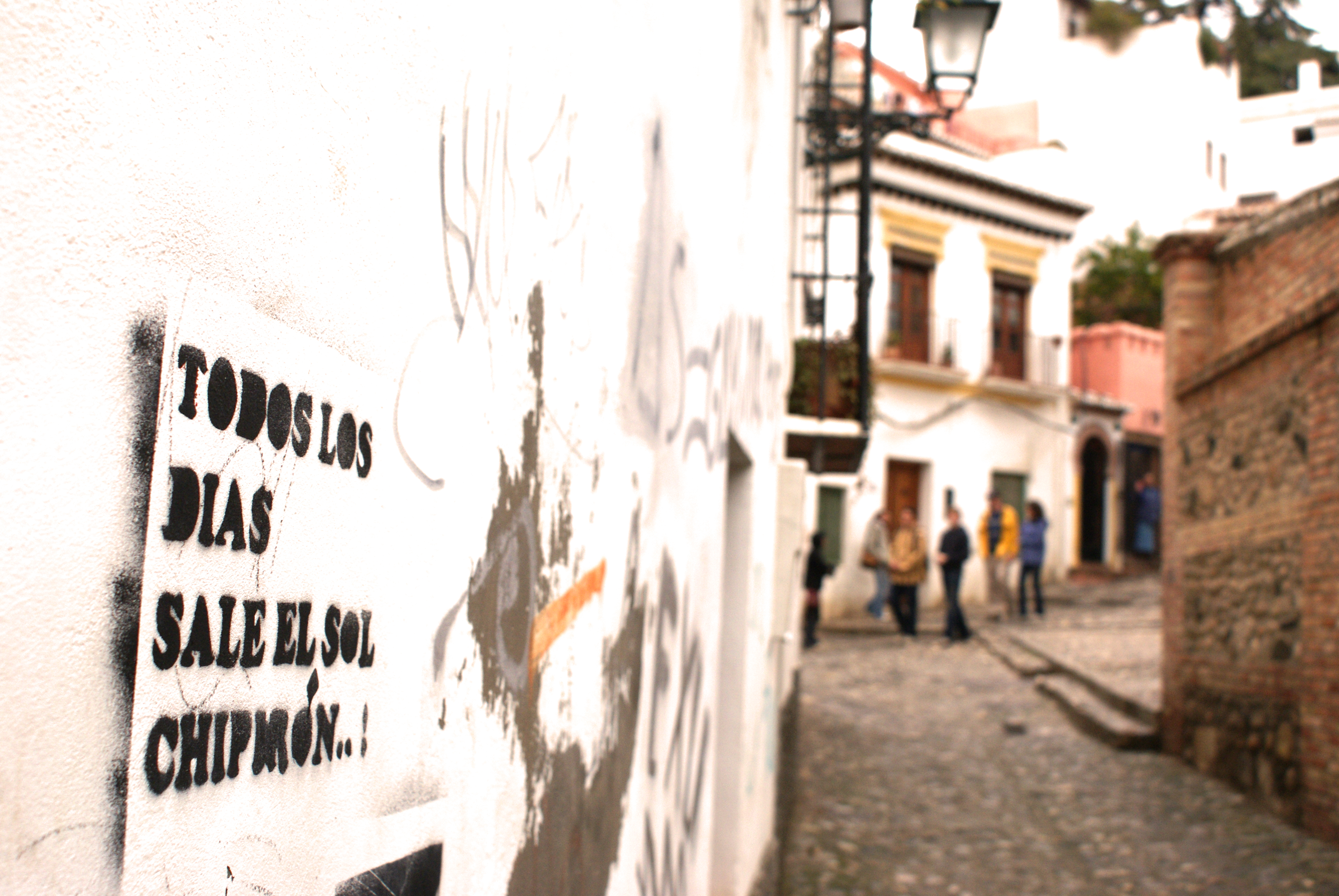
Original graffiti that inspired the song, in Granada, Spain.

Uri Giné wrote the song in Granada, Spain, where he lived for a few months. He was inspired by a graffiti on a wall that he saw while walking around the Albayzín district. The graffiti read the optimistic phrase "Todos los días sale el sol chipirón..!". In Spanish, "chipirón" means "small squid", but in this context the word was used as a funny way to refer to a person. A few days later, Giné woke up in the middle of the night with this phrase in his head and wrote the whole song in thirty minutes. Even though the lyrics aren't completely explicit, Giné once admitted that the song is mainly about sexual experiences that he had while living in Granada.

== Music video ==
The music video for "Todos los días sale el sol" was directed by Egoi Suso. It was shot in Tarragona, Spain on 20 May 2011 and was released on 23 June 2011. In the video, frontman Uri Giné is shown singing the song as he walks down the street and meets his bandmates. He also passes through two bars, a hair salon and a bar's kitchen, and he finally arrives to a small square where he sings along with the whole band and a crowd of fans. Uri Giné wanted the music video to end in this square because he used to play his songs there very often before forming the band. Actually, another song from the same album, called "La plaça de la alegría", is about this square and some stories that took place there. The real name of the square is Plaça Sedassos and it is located in the old town of Tarragona, Spain.

== Personnel ==
Credits adapted from the liner notes of Todos los días sale el sol.

Bongo Botrako

- Uri Giné – vocals, production
- Nacho Pascual – guitar
- Xavi Vallverdú – keyboard
- David Garcia – bass
- Gorka Robert – drums, percussion
- Xavi Barrero – trumpet
- Oscar Gómez – sax

Additional musicians

- Rubén Sierra – vocals
- Adrià Salas – vocals

Production

- Mario Patiño – production, engineering, mixing
- Edgar Beltri – additional engineering
- Yves Roussel – mastering

Design

- Cristina Pastrana – design

== Charts ==
Chart (2011)	Peak position
Spain Top 50 (Promusicae)	12
Spain iTunes Top 10	2
