= The Brief Wondrous Life of Oscar Wao =

2007 novel by Junot Díaz

- First edition hardcover
- Author: Junot Díaz
- Cover artist: Rodrigo Corral
- Language: English, Spanish
- Publisher: Riverhead
- Publication date: September 6, 2007
- Publication place: United States
- Media type: Print (hardback and paperback)
- Pages: 352 pp
- ISBN: 1-59448-958-0
- OCLC: 123539681
- Dewey Decimal: 813/.54 22
- LC Class: PS3554.I259 B75 2007

The Brief Wondrous Life of Oscar Wao is a 2007 novel written by Dominican American author Junot Díaz. The novel is set in New Jersey in the United States, where Díaz was raised, and deals with the Dominican Republic's experience under dictator Rafael Trujillo. The book chronicles the life of Oscar de León, an overweight Dominican boy growing up in Paterson, New Jersey, who is obsessed with science fiction and fantasy novels and with falling in love, as well as a curse that has plagued his family for generations.

Narrated by multiple characters, the novel incorporates a significant amount of Spanglish and neologisms, as well as references to fantasy and science fiction books and films. Its overarching theme of the fukú curse also contains elements of magic realism. It received highly positive reviews from critics, who praised Díaz's writing style and the multi-generational story. The Brief Wondrous Life of Oscar Wao went on to win numerous awards in 2008, such as the National Book Critics Circle Award and the Pulitzer Prize for Fiction.

== Concept ==
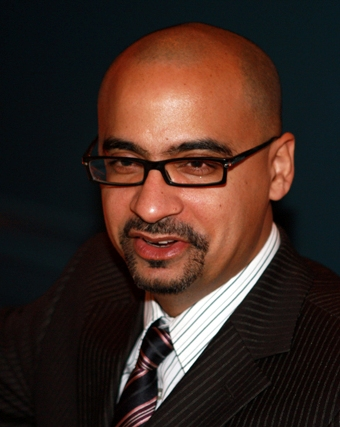
Junot Díaz

The book chronicles the life of Oscar de León, a Dominican boy growing up in Paterson, New Jersey, who is obsessed with science fiction and fantasy novels and with falling in love, as well as with the curse that has plagued his family for generations.

The middle sections of the novel center on the lives of Oscar's runaway sister, Lola; his mother, Hypatia Belicia Cabral; and his grandfather, Abelard. Rife with footnotes, science fiction and fantasy references, comic book analogies, and various Spanish dialects, the novel mediates story-telling, the Dominican diaspora, identity, sexuality, and oppression.

Most of the story is told by an apparently omniscient narrator who is eventually revealed to be Yunior de Las Casas, a college roommate of Oscar's who dated Lola. Yunior also appears in many of Díaz's short stories and is often seen as an alter ego of the author.

== Plot ==
=== Main narrative ===
Oscar de León (nicknamed Oscar Wao, a bastardization of Oscar Wilde) is a Dominican growing up in Paterson, New Jersey. Oscar desperately wants to be successful with women but, from a young age, cannot find love, primarily because he is a nerd obsessed with science fiction and comic books who is often bullied for his large weight. His greatest fear is that he will die a virgin.

After high school, Oscar attends Rutgers University–New Brunswick. His sister's boyfriend Yunior (the narrator of much of the novel) moves in with Oscar, trying to help him get in shape and become more "normal". After "getting dissed by a girl", Oscar attempts to kill himself by drinking three bottles of liquor and jumping off the Raritan River Bridge. He survives the fall but is seriously injured.

Oscar recuperates and graduates from Rutgers. He teaches as a substitute at his former high school and dreams about writing an epic work of science fiction. Eventually, he moves to the Dominican Republic and falls helplessly in love with Ybon, a woman who lives near him and who works as a prostitute. Ybon is kind to Oscar but rejects his frequent romantic overtures. Ybon's boyfriend, a violent police captain, becomes jealous of Oscar and sends two goons who kidnap Oscar, take him to the sugarcane fields, and beat him into a coma. Oscar's family takes him back to the United States to heal.

Oscar recovers from the beating, borrows money from Yunior, and returns to the Dominican Republic. He spends 27 days writing and stalking Ybon. She is horrified at first but softens and eventually has sex with Oscar. Ybon's boyfriend's goons then find Oscar, take him back to the sugarcane fields, and kill him.

=== Flashbacks and secondary narratives ===
The novel contains significant exposition on Oscar's family history. One section is a first-person narrative from the perspective of Oscar's sister, Lola, who explains her struggles to get along with their headstrong mother, Beli. Subsequent sections detail Beli's backstory growing up as an orphan in the Dominican Republic after her father was imprisoned and her mother and two sisters died. Her father was imprisoned after failing to bring his wife and daughter to meet some government officials, as he feared they would take them. After being raised by an aunt, Beli enters a relationship with a wealthy gangster named Dionisio. However, Dionisio turns out to be married to one of Rafael Trujillo's sisters, who, in parallel with her son, has Beli taken to a cane field and also beaten nearly to death. She then escapes to the United States.

== Style ==
=== Narration ===
Instead of Díaz directly telling the story to the reader, he creates an aesthetic distance by speaking through the novel's narrator, Yunior. Yunior provides analysis and commentary on the events he relays in the novel. His speech often exemplifies code switching, switching rapidly from a lively, Caribbean-inflected vernacular, replete with frequent profanity, to wordy, eloquent, and academic prose. This runs in parallel to several central themes of the novel regarding identity, as Yunior's code-switching alludes to a struggle between his Dominican identity and his identity as a writer. Code-switching between Spanish and English is also central to the narrative itself of the book, as characters switch back and forth as they see fit.

The book's narration also shifts away from Yunior to another character at several critical moments in the story. In chapter two, Lola narrates her story in the first person, foreshadowing the intimacy between Lola and Yunior. The beginning of chapter two also features second-person narration, which is rarely used in literature.

Díaz's use of Yunior as the book's main narrator strengthens the novel's idea as metafiction. Yunior consistently reminds the reader that he is telling the story instead of the story happening in its own right.

=== Footnotes ===
The Brief Wondrous Life of Oscar Wao extensively uses footnotes to the point that many of the characters are developed in the footnotes in addition to the story. Rather than provide factual background, Yunior's narrative continues in the footnotes just as it does in the body of the novel. When describing Oscar's deep love of science fiction and fantasy literature, Yunior continues in the footnotes: "Where this outsized love of genre jumped off from no one quite seems to know. It might have been a consequence being Antillean (who more sci-fi than us?) ..." The presence of Yunior's footnotes, therefore, reminds the reader that there is always more to one's story.

Yunior even refers in the footnotes to his present life earlier in the novel than when he describes it in Chapter Eight. "In my first draft, Samaná was actually Jarabacoa, but then my girl Leonie, resident expert in all things Domo, pointed out that there are no beaches in Jarabacoa." Yunior thus builds the writing of the novel and his relationship with Oscar into the greater history of the Dominican Republic. The many science fiction references throughout the novel and footnotes emphasize (Yunior believes) the fantastical elements of Dominican history. Yunior cites the fall of Mordor and the dispelling of evil from Middle Earth from The Lord of the Rings as a complement to the fall of Trujillo.

The footnotes contain many references specifically to the reign of Rafael Trujillo from 1930 to 1961, providing historical background on figures like the Mirabal Sisters, whom Trujillo assassinated, and Anacaona, an Indigenous woman who fought against the invading Spanish colonialists. While referencing historical figures, Yunior frequently includes the novel's fictional characters in the historical events.

"But what was even more ironic was that Abelard had a reputation for being able to keep his head down during the worst of the regime's madness—for unseeing, as it were. In 1937, for example, while the Friends of the Dominican Republic were perejiling Haitians and Haitian-Dominicans and Haitian-looking Dominicans to death, while genocide was, in fact, in the making, Abelard kept his head, eyes, and nose safely tucked into his books (let his wife take care of hiding his servants, asked her nothing about it). When survivors staggered into his surgery with unspeakable machete wounds, he fixed them up as best he could without making any comments as to the ghastliness of their wounds."

Thus, Yunior builds a context for Dominican history, where the characters are used just as much in the footnotes as in the body of the novel.

Many footnotes ultimately connect to themes of coming to a new world (underscored through the novel's references to fantasy and sci-fi) or having one's world completely changed. Trujillo's reign, as revealed in the novel's footnotes, becomes as dystopian as one of Oscar's favorite science fiction novels.

=== Slang ===
Díaz moves between several styles in the novel as the narrative shifts to each character. Oscar's speech reflects an autodidactic language based on his knowledge of fantasy, 'nerd' literature and his speech is filled with phrases such as "I think she's orchidaceous" and "I do not move so precipitously", whereas Yunior "affects a bilingual b-boy flow" and intersperses it with literary language. The story of the De Léon family is told and collected by the fictional narrator Yunior and the New York Times critic Michiko Kakutani has described the voice of the book as "a streetwise brand of Spanglish". He often gives his commentary and analysis on the events he is relating in the story and sometimes reveals failings in his own life, both as a narrator and a person: "Players: never never never fuck with a bitch named Awilda. Because when she awildas out on your ass, you'll know pain for real."

His informal and frequent use of neologisms can be seen in sentences such as a description of Trujillo as "the Dictatingest Dictator who ever Dictated" or his description of the effectiveness of Trujillo's secret police force: "you could say a bad thing about El Jefe at eight-forty in the morning and before the clock struck ten you'd be in the Cuarenta having a cattleprod shoved up your ass."

Oscar Wao also oscillates between English and Spanish. Yunior peppers the English-speaking novel with Spanish vocabulary and phrases, and specific English sentences are built with Spanish syntax: "Beli might have been a puta major in the cosmology of her neighbors but a cuero she was not."

Oscar lives his life surrounded by the culture of fantasy and, as Oscar describes them, "the more speculative genres", and the language of these cultures are strewn throughout the book along with Spanish. Brief phrases relating to games like Dungeons & Dragons and tabletop role-playing game terms are used as common colloquialisms: "He [Oscar] could have refused, could have made a saving throw against Torture, but instead he went with the flow."

=== Magical realism ===
The Brief and Wondrous Life of Oscar Wao contains several of the hallmarks of Latin American magical realism. The novel's plot is intricately bound up with the notion of Fukú Americanus, which is "generally a curse of doom of some kind; specifically, the Curse or Doom of the New World". The reliance on Fukú, and its counterpart Zafa gives the novel a fantastical element which shows the magical realism aspect of the plot, as the narrative follows the impact of the supernatural curse. This is coupled with other supernatural elements, such as the man with no face and the mongoose.

The novel's fantastical elements occur in New Jersey and the Dominican Republic. This combination establishes a real-world setting for these events and blends the natural with the supernatural, another attribute of magical realism.

In addition to the fantastical elements of the novel, Oscar Wao also includes a degree of political critique in the discussion of the Trujillo dictatorship of the Dominican Republic and a portrayal of metafiction in Oscar's writing on fantasy novels. Both political critique and metafiction are typical features of magical realism.

Díaz also hints at the novel’s magical realist elements by claiming that Fúku was popular in places like Macondo, which is the fictional setting for One Hundred Years of Solitude by Gabriel García Márquez, which is seen as one of the most prominent Latin American magical realist novels.

=== Speculative fiction ===
The Brief Wondrous Life of Oscar Wao can be used as an example of speculative fiction. Speculative fiction is a sub-category that deals with ideas that are not directly real but imaginative or futuristic. The plot of this novel skips from past to present. It focuses on different characters' stories at various times to convey the long-lasting impression that Rafael Trujillo's dictatorship in the Dominican Republic from 1930 to 1961 left. To emphasize the brutality of the past, the novel blends aspects of sci-fi and fantasy with horror as well as popular culture. By combining all of these elements, Diaz creates a work of speculative fiction that holds various social critiques.

==== Using Trujillo as a minor character ====
The novel uses history to set the scene and create its social and political commentary. The basis of all of the problems in this novel is the dictatorship of Rafael Trujillo, which lasted for over 30 years. Junot Diaz surely includes Trujillo as a character in the story but limits his representation to descriptions that come from Yunior's perspective. Because of this, Trujillo has an important role in the story, but is ultimately weakened due to the given perspective. Diaz creates irony using this strong dictator as a minor character and focusing on the characters that would have otherwise been marginalized. This arrangement destabilizes established power hierarchies, putting more emphasis on the seemingly least powerful characters and taking power away from the most prominent and infamous characters.

Furthermore, when Trujillo is referenced by Yunior in his narration, the descriptions are entirely negative. Yunior's references show little respect and are meant to belittle Trujillo's presence in the story. By actively disparaging the brutal dictator, Diaz breaks social and cultural norms about how common people function in a power hierarchy. Yunior is given the power to represent Trujillo which lessens Trujillos dominance in the power scale, allowing the novel to have a strong stance against the dictatorship, stripping Trujillo of the meaning behind his title. Overall, making Trujillo the minor character allows Trujillo to be seen as more of a joke than a strong leader while also enforcing the seriousness and long-lasting effects of his power.

==== Lola's Daughter ====
Throughout the novel, Diaz uses metaphors and symbols to present Dominican history as well as the fuku curse. Lola is Oscar's older sister, and her daughter serves as a symbol of the potential to break the fuku curse. Lola's daughter is a character that holds the future for the De Leon family and symbolically the entire Dominican culture. She symbolizes the Dominican identity struggle of growing up with two cultural ties, that of the Dominican Republic and that of the United States. Although in the story her character does not know her own role, she must accept and embrace her Dominican culture to break the curse. This sense of uncertainty towards this fantastical curse allows the novel to speculate as to how it can be broken. The curse itself is meant to be a defining factor of Dominican culture. Diaz ties in Lola's daughters character with breaking the curse to show that the future of Dominican culture is to be defined by aspects others that a history of oppression and colonization. The idea that an individual has the power the change the effects of the curse in their own life is a way for the novel to show that Dominican culture can be changed in a way that marginalized people can have power.

==== Yunior as the narrator ====
Although Yunior is the narrator of the story, and everything that is said comes from his perspective, the story revolves around the unlikely hero, Oscar. Oscar is a shy, overweight teenager who loves to read and write science fiction and fantasy and is searching for love. He is constantly deemed not masculine enough by those around him, and he does not follow the norms of his Dominican culture. He too is affected by the fuku curse that stems from a long history of oppression, and the only way for him to break free is to acknowledge his own culture while also adapting to his new surroundings in the United States. Oscar's character's love for science fiction allows Diaz to intertwine metaphors from the science fiction realm such as that of "Watchmen". This reference allows Diaz to propose the question of whether or not it is just to 'save humanity' by killing a human and make parallels to Oscar's decision running away with Ybon as well as the future of Dominican culture and history. By referencing "nothing ever ends" on page 331 in the novel, Diaz proposes that the past cannot be changed, but must ultimately be accepted to create a better future and reclaim the culture.

Oscar's story is not the only one that Yunior tells. Yunior covers multiple generations of the De Leon family history to emphasize the transgenerational struggles and the inheritance of the fuku curse. Because of the way that the story is narrated, the readers get a comprehensive view of the cultural factors that surround Oscar that ultimately lead to his tragic death. Diaz shows that the mistakes made in Oscar's family lead to Oscar's fate, providing a cautionary tale for the future of Dominican culture in a fantastical context. Furthermore, Yunior recounts the stories and history of a family that is not his own. He is invested with the telling of their story, but is simultaneously reserved. He even admits that as the one telling the story, he holds a certain amount of power. By reconstructing the De Leon family story, and not letting the characters speak for themselves, Yunior subconsciously follows the 'Trujillan model of narration', suppressing their own stories for his own mental gain whether it be a recreated connection to Lola, his ex-girlfriend or Oscar, his friend.

Even when talking about Oscar, Yunior does not focus on the fact that he is nerdy and does not hide it, but rather makes allusions to science fiction and fantasy works that Oscar would be familiar with. Yunior also shows that he and Oscar were not so different after all, but the difference was in the fact that Oscar was not able to hide the fact that he was an outcast while Yunior was able to fit in while keeping his unique qualities and interests to himself.

== Themes and motifs ==
=== The mongoose ===
Mongooses appear throughout The Brief Wondrous Life of Oscar Wao as guardians of the family. Historically, the mongoose was imported from Asia during the 18th century. Mongooses were imported to tropical islands such as the Dominican Republic, Jamaica, and Hawaii. Used to protect sugar cane fields from rat infestations, mongoose were pivotal in the DR's growing sugar economy. While the mongoose is transplanted from Asia, it retroactively becomes a "norm" within the DR's plantation system. While the mongoose guides Beli, its presence is necessary for sugar production. The mongoose is known for its sociability and cunning. Like the de Leon family, the mongoose is an immigrant, an invasive, non-native species. The mongoose was transplanted westward to the Dominican Republic, just as Oscar's family was forced out of the Dominican Republic. Díaz has stated the importance of the mongoose as being alien, creating an other-worldly quality to its assistance. Furthermore, in a footnote, the mongoose is described as "an enemy of kingly charriots, chains, and hierarchies... an ally of Man", suggesting the mongoose's importance in helping the de Leon family not just for their misfortune but also as a means of undermining Trujillo's oppression.

At the most superficial level, the mongoose can be equated with the zafa, the counter-spell to the family's fukú. For example, when Beli is beaten in the canefield, a "creature that would have been an amiable mongoose if not for its golden lion eyes and the absolute black of its pelt" motivates Beli and sings to her to guide her out of the canefield. The creature acts as her protector, saving her after the atrocities just committed against her. The mongoose further stops a bus directly in front of her, preventing her from being hit and providing her transportation to safety. Similarly, Oscar remembers a "Golden Mongoose" which appeared just before he throws himself from the bridge and again when he is beaten in the canefield for the first time. In the canefield, the mongoose talks to Oscar and saves him just as Beli was saved. Furthermore, just as the singing mongoose leads Beli to safety, a singing voice leads Clives to Oscar.

This symbolic relationship is heightened by the transient nature of the mongoose, disappearing as suddenly as it appears. Each time the mysterious animal appears in a time of dire need, the narrator includes a disclaimer on the accuracy in the visions of the creature. In the case of Beli in the cane fields, the narrator shares that whether her encounter with the mongoose "was a figment of Beli's wracked imagination or something else altogether" cannot be determined (149). Whether or not this creature is a figment of the young woman's imagination, it led her to safety and provided hope in a situation where death seemed imminent. In having this character take on such a surreal nature with characteristics not found in most mongooses, such as the ability to talk and vanishing in the blink of an eye, Díaz establishes an uncertainty that mirrors the controversies over whether superstitions exist. While the encounters with the creature may or may not have happened, their significance in the book still holds strong just like the superstitions, because "no matter what you believe, the fukú believes in you" (5). The connection between a superstition and a magical character is more easily followed than one with an ordinary animal, highlighting the mongoose being a zafa against the de Leon's fukú.

=== Canefields ===
The re/appearances of canefields in Oscar Wao are symbolic. The scenes of physical violence against Beli and Oscar are set in this specific, geographical space of the sugar canefields. Sugar was introduced to the Dominican Republic and Haiti, then Hispaniola, through colonialism. Sugar and canefields were so important to the Spanish as they fueled their wealth and the creation of a white elite, and thus plantation economy, in Hispaniola.

Brother murder is a central theme. The grandfather Abelard's name makes it clear that the homonym cane/Cain is no coincidence.

They first appear when Beli is kidnapped and taken to be beaten in a canefield. Here, the canefields are surrounded by the context of the Trujillato. After Beli (unknowingly) becomes involved with Trujillo's sister's husband, The Gangster's men assault her there. The canefields are thus a violent space where Trujillo's henchpeople also take care of business. As written in footnotes, the Mirabal sisters were murdered there, too. In this section of the book Yunior says, "Canefields are no fucking joke, and even the cleverest of adults can get mazed in their endlessness, only to reappear months later as a cameo of bones". Much later, after Oscar returns home to La Inca's to try to be with Ybón, he also ends up assaulted in a canefield, but this time by the Capitan's friends. A lot of the emotions and the atmosphere laid out in Oscar's canefield scene parallels Beli's.

The canefields in the Dominican Republic are a space made significant through their history of slavery and violence—a racialized space. Canefields are where enslaved Africans were forced into labor and dehumanization. These Beli and Oscar canefield scenes are haunted by the displacement and violence against enslaved Africans, the displacement and genocide of indigenous folks, and also the revolts and resistance to these systems.

=== Power of appearance ===
Beli understood how advantageous appearance is in the social situations of the Dominican Republic, but not until she had undergone major physical and psychological changes. Beli desired the same romantic experience as Oscar, despising school in her early years from being "completely alone" (83). Her loneliness derived from her "defensive and aggressive and mad overactive" personality that pushed people miles away from her. Unlike Oscar, however, her predicament reversed, becoming not one of a lack of power, but an abundance. She had to choose whether or not to take advantage of her new curvaceous body which puberty had generously bestowed upon her. With these new curves she was thrown into a world where she could get what she wanted, where she was given attention without having to ask for it. Her model-like body presented her with the relationships that she could have never attained otherwise. After recovering from her initial shock of the metamorphosis, she discovered how "her desirability was in its own way, Power" (94). She had been presented with a magical sceptre that allowed her to satisfy her desires. Asking her not to abuse that power was akin to, as Díaz says it "asking the persecuted fat kid not to use his recently discovered mutant abilities" (94). By using her appearance, she gained a complete understanding of the influences of her body.

The power of appearance in the era of Trujillo can not be underestimated, as seen by its dangerous consequences in the de León family history. Abelard Luis Cabral, Oscar's grandfather, learned this first hand after repeatedly refusing to bring his first-born daughter Jacquelyn to Trujillo's events. Trujillo's rapacity towards women knew no bounds, employing "hundreds of spies whose entire job was to scour the provinces for his next piece of ass" (217). Trujillo's appetite for ass was "insatiable" (217), pushing him to do unspeakable things. His culture of placing appearance above all else does nothing to deemphasize appearance in Dominican culture, seeing as in a normal political atmosphere people follow their leaders, much less in the tightly controlled Trujillan dictatorship. Abelard, by withholding his daughter's "off-the-hook looks" (216) from Trujillo, he was in effect committing "treason" (217). His actions eventually resulted in Trujillo arranging for his arrest and 18-year sentence, where he was brutally beaten and treated to an endless series of electric shock treatments (237). During his imprisonment, Socorro committed suicide, Jackie "was found drowned" in a pool, Astrid is struck by a stray bullet, and his third child is born (248–250). Abelard and Socorro's third child, a daughter they name Belicia, was born "black", a terrible thing for the Dominicans, who viewed having a child of "black complexion as an ill omen" (248). They felt so strongly about this that Yunior, offering his own opinion, comments "I doubt anybody inside the family wanted her to live, either" (252). She eventually was tossed around the extended family and eventually "sold", yes "That's right-she was sold" (253). All of these tragedies as a result of the desire for a beautiful young lady, a by product of the preeminence given to physical appearance.

Even under Trujillo, however, the power of appearance is called into the question, as appearance's power ultimately takes second place to the power of words. Cabral is incarcerated, tortured and almost destroyed at least in part as a result of words he has spoken and written, and Trujillo has Cabral's entire library, including any sample of his handwriting, destroyed. As Trujillo never attempts to sleep with Jackie, the narrator and reader are left to wonder if at some level the motivation for this family ruin has to do with silencing a powerful voice.

=== Reexamining masculinity through Yunior and Oscar ===
Yunior and Oscar are character foils that illustrate two different types of masculinity: if Oscar's nerdiness, fatness and awkwardness make him the antithesis of Dominican hypermasculinity, then Yunior, as a Don Juan and a state school player who can "bench 340 pounds" (170), is the embodiment of that identity. They also have completely opposite values: while Yunior cheats habitually and can't appreciate even the most beautiful and loving women, Oscar is faithful and sees beauty in a middle-aged prostitute; while Yunior doesn't value sex for anything other than physical pleasure (at least not at first), Oscar refuses to go to brothels (279). Yunior's masculinity echoes that of Trujillo, who in his violent actions and lust for women, also embodies Dominican hypermasculinity.

Despite their differences, Yunior and Oscar become important to each other and develop an unusual friendship. As Oscar has no father or brothers, Yunior is the only male with whom he can discuss his romantic yearnings; Yunior is his access into masculinity. As for Yunior, Oscar models an alternative form of masculinity and ultimately pushes him to reexamine his ideas about manhood. VanBeest points out that in spite Oscar's lack of machismo, he possesses "other masculine traits that Yunior admires." For example, Yunior envies the way Oscar can develop friendships with women (like Jenni) and talk to them about non-sexual topics. He also respects Oscar's writing style and his ability to "write dialogue, crack snappy exposition, keep the narrative moving" (173). Finally, although Oscar dies in the end, Yunior admires how he was able to achieve real intimacy with a girl by being loving, faithful and vulnerable. VanBeest argues that Oscar "succeeds in educating Yunior, indirectly, in the responsibilities of manhood; after Oscar's death, Yunior claims that it is Oscar's influence that encourages him to stop following the dictates of el machismo and finally settle down and get married." At the end of the novel, Yunior manages to develop a healthier form of masculinity that allows him to love others and to achieve intimacy.

Through Yunior and Oscar's friendship, Díaz critically examines Dominican machismo and shows how it can lead to violence and an inability to connect with others. Through the figure of Oscar, he explores alternatives to hypermasculinity. If "fukú" is "[the] manifestation of the masculine ideals imposed on the Dominican Republic herself," then is Oscar the zafa of this fukú.

=== Filling the blank pages – stories as "zafa" for the fukú of violence ===
Throughout the novel, violence is transmitted from the system of colonialism and dictators to the domestic sphere and perpetuated through the generations. Virtually all the relationships in the book – Trujillo and Abelard, Beli and the Gangster, Beli and Lola, Oscar and Ybón – are marked with physical or emotional abuse. Violence is an aspect of the "fukú" or curse that haunts the Cabrals and de Leons.

At the very beginning of the novel, it is explained that zafa is the "one way to prevent disaster from coiling around you, only one surefire counterspell that would keep you and your family safe" (7). In this way, zafa can be read as an undoing of colonialism because as fuku brings misery and bad luck, zafa has the potential to foil it and restore a more favorable balance.

Although by the end none of the characters seem to have escaped the cycle of violence or the effects of fukú, Yunior has a dream in which Oscar waves a blank book at him, and he realizes that this can be a "zafa" (325) to the family curse. Yunior also has hope that Isis, Lola's daughter, will one day come to him asking for stories about her family history, and "if she's smart and as brave as I'm expecting she'll be, she'll take all we've done and all we've learned and add her own insights and she'll put an end to it [the fukú]" (331). Thus, the empty pages in Yunior's dreams signify that the future has yet to be written despite the checkered past, in both his life and in the painful history of oppression and colonialism in the Dominican Republic. On the other hand, Isis potentially coming to Yunior to learn more about her uncle represents gaining an understanding of the past, which is key to decolonizing and pinpointing the structures that are systematically oppressive. Yunior implies that storytelling is a way to acknowledge the past and its influence over one's life, a way to make sense of what has happened, and is the starting point for healing.

With the absence of any embodiments of white characters to emphasize the lasting impact of the colonial imaginary, the mysticism behind the fuku and zafa become that much more convincing. When interpreted as magic instead of as the literal actions of white people, the fuku and zafa transcend human beings and remind us that even when colonialism is not particularly obvious, it is a force that looms over all, and its effects must first be confronted before anyone can take action accordingly, as Yunior's dream suggests.

In an interview with Edwidge Danticat, Junot Díaz commented:

"For me, though, the real issue in the book is not whether or not one can vanquish the fukú—but whether or not one can even see it. Acknowledge its existence at a collective level. To be a true witness to who we are as a people and to what has happened to us. That is the essential challenge for the Caribbean nations—who, as you pointed out, have been annihilated by history and yet who've managed to put themselves together in an amazing way. That's why I thought the book was somewhat hopeful at the end."

== Literary allusions ==
Comic books, science-fiction, and fantasy literature all play an important role in Oscar's upbringing and identity, and each is incorporated into the novel to reflect the world he lives in. Díaz has said that to dismiss the novel's reflexivity with fiction and fantasy is to do to the novel "exactly what Oscar suffered from, which is that...Oscar's interests, his views of the world, were dismissed as illegitimate, as unimportant, as make-believe", and that the novel asks the reader "to take not only Oscar seriously but his interests seriously."

=== Comic books ===
The novel opens with an epigraph: "Of what import are brief, nameless lives…to Galactus?" Díaz has said that this question can be read as being directed at the reader, "because in some ways, depending on how you answer that question, it really decides whether you're Galactus or not." In the Fantastic Four comic book however, Galactus is asking the question of Uatu the Watcher, whose role is played out in Díaz's novel by the narrator Yunior, indicating to Díaz that the question is both a "question to the reader but also a question to writers in general."

Early in the novel, Díaz aligns Oscar with comic book superheroes: "You want to know what being an X-man feels like? Just be a smart bookish boy of color in a contemporary U.S. ghetto...Like having bat wings or a pair of tentacles growing out of your chest." Díaz hints at possible latent abilities or qualities Oscar may possess that will reveal themselves or develop later in the novel.

The novel describes the history of relationships between dictators and writer in terms of comic book rivalries as well: "Since before the infamous Caesar-Ovid war they've [dictators and writers] had beef. Like the Fantastic Four and Galactus, like the X-Men and the Brotherhood of Evil Mutants, like the Teen Titans and Deathstroke"

There is also a strong suggestion that the fantastical element of Oscar's life is a powerful method for him to relate to other people and to the world around him. When he examines his own body in the mirror he feels "straight out of a Daniel Clowes book. Or like the fat blackish kid in Beto Hernández's Palomar." Oscar's vast memory of comic books and fantasy/science-fiction is recalled whenever he is involved in the text, and his identity is multiform, composed of scraps of comic book marginalia.

Díaz creates a distinct link between human beings' performative nature and the masks required to express it, and the masks worn by superheroes. When Oscar meets Ana, one of the many women with whom he falls in love, he notices different aspects of her life and "there was something in the seamlessness with which she switched between these aspects that convinced him that both were masks". Díaz connects the removal of masks with both the intimacy that springs from vulnerability and the concept of identity, hidden or otherwise. Oscar's infinite capacity for empathy and connection with other human beings is a superpower in its own right. Contemporary masculinity and contemporary power structures leave no room for vulnerability, but for Díaz, "the only way to encounter a human is by being vulnerable." The "man with no face" who reoccurs in several parts of the novel can also be read as a sort of mask embodying the fukú.

=== Fantasy and science-fiction ===
Díaz frequently uses references to works of science-fiction and fantasy. These references serve both to illuminate the world that Oscar lives in and create a parallel between the supernatural events in fantasy literature and the history of the Dominican Republic. In the opening pages of the novel, the narrator quotes Oscar as having said "What more sci-fi than Santo Domingo? What more fantasy than the Antilles?" One of Díaz's frequent references to J. R. R. Tolkien comes when he describes Trujillo: "Homeboy dominated Santo Domingo like it was his very own private Mordor." In another section, Felix Wenceslao Bernardino, an agent of Trujillo is metaphorically described as the Witchking of Angmar.

Near the end of the book Diáz comprehensively links the fantasy world of Middle-Earth with the world of the Dominican Republic and the novel.

At the end of The Return of the King, Sauron's evil was taken by "a great wind" and neatly "blown away", with no lasting consequences to our heroes; but Trujillo was too powerful, too toxic a radiation to be dispelled so easily. Even after death his evil lingered. Within hours of El Jefe dancing bien pegao with those twenty-seven bullets, his minions ran amok−fulfilling, as it were, his last will and vengeance. A great darkness descended on the Island and for the third time since the rise of Fidel people were being rounded up by Trujillo's son, Ramfis, and a good plenty were sacrificed in the most depraved fashion imaginable, the orgy of terror funeral goods for the father from the son. Even a woman as potent as La Inca, who with the elvish ring of her will had forged within Banί her own personal Lothlόrien, knew that she could not protect the girl against a direct assault from the Eye.

Twice in the novel the mantra "Fear is the mindkiller" is repeated. The phrase originated in the Frank Herbert novel Dune and Oscar uses it to try and quell his own fear near the end of the story, to no avail.

Díaz also references Stephen King on a number of occasions, including a reference to Captain Trips, the fictional virus that wipes out mankind in The Stand, as well as two references to its characters, Harold Lauder, compared to Oscar, and to Mother Abagail, compared to La Inca. Likewise, there is a mention of being "flung into the macroverse" by "the ritual of Chud", a nod to the ending of It.

== Critical reception ==
The Brief Wondrous Life of Oscar Wao was widely praised by critics and appeared in a number of "best of the year" book lists.

The book won the John Sargent, Sr. First Novel Prize, the Dayton Literary Peace Prize in Fiction, the National Book Critics Circle Award, and the Pulitzer Prize for Fiction in 2008. New York magazine named it the Best Novel of the Year and Time magazine's Lev Grossman named it the best work of fiction published in 2007, praising it as "a massive, heaving, sparking tragicomedy".

In a 2009 poll by The Millions a panel of writers, critics, and editors voted The Brief Wondrous Life of Oscar Wao the eighth-best novel since 2000, and readers ranked it in first place. In a poll of American literary critics organised by BBC Culture (the arts and culture section of the international BBC website) in 2015, The Brief Wondrous Life of Oscar Wao was voted the twenty-first century's best novel so far. In 2024, it was named the 11th best book The New York Times' 100 Best Books of the 21st Century list.

== Adaptations ==
A staged version of the novel, called Fukú Americanus, was adapted by Sean San Jose and co-directed by San Jose and Marc Bamuthi Joseph through San Jose's Campo Santo theatre company in 2009. The production received mixed reviews, with critic Robert Hurwitt stating that "'Fukú' doesn't show us how that works or what the curse has to do with anything ... for that, you have to read the book."

In 2019, Repertorio Español produced La Breve y Maravillosa Vida de Oscar Wao, a Spanish-language adaptation of the novel at Gramercy Arts Theatre in New York written and directed by Marco Antonio Rodríguez. An English version of the play also written by Rodríguez and directed by Wendy Mateo premiered at the Goodman Theatre in Chicago in February 2026.

=== Film ===
The novel's film rights were optioned by Miramax Films and producer Scott Rudin in 2007. Director Walter Salles and writer Jose Rivera (The Motorcycle Diaries) were hired by Rudin to adapt the novel. According to Díaz, Miramax's rights on the book have since expired.

== See also ==
- Latino literature
- American literature
