= List of folk rock artists =

This is a list of musicians who have both significant folk and rock elements in their music, even if they are not considered primarily folk rock artists.

== Singer-songwriters ==
- Chava Alberstein
- Eric Andersen
- Ian Anderson
- Joan Armatrading
- Asaf Avidan
- Joan Baez
- Đorđe Balašević
- Devendra Banhart
- James Bay
- Beck
- Ryan Bingham
- Andrew Bird
- David Blue
- Tim Buckley
- Bon Iver
- Jonatha Brooke
- Jackson Browne
- Jeff Buckley
- Jake Bugg
- Cletis Carr
- Peter Case
- Cat Power
- Harry Chapin
- Tracy Chapman
- Vic Chesnutt
- City and Colour
- Gene Clark
- Bruce Cockburn
- Leonard Cohen
- David Crosby
- Keaton Henson
- Judy Collins
- Matt Costa
- Jonathan Coulton
- Jim Croce
- John Denver
- Kevin Devine
- Lee DeWyze
- Ani DiFranco
- Donovan
- Alan Doyle
- Nick Drake
- Marshall Drew
- Bob Dylan
- Jonathan Edwards
- Cass Elliot
- E
- Marianne Faithfull
- Brian Fallon
- Leslie Feist
- William Fitzsimmons
- Dan Fogelberg
- Steve Forbert
- Art Garfunkel
- Aaron Gillespie
- Steve Goodman
- Mark Gormley
- Nanci Griffith
- Arlo Guthrie
- Dae-Soo Hahn
- Glen Hansard
- Tim Hardin
- Françoise Hardy
- PJ Harvey
- Jake Holmes
- Ben Howard
- Iron & Wine
- Gérard Jaffrès
- Joshua James
- Bert Jansch
- Jewel
- Amy Jo Johnson
- Jack Johnson
- Wizz Jones
- Jorma Kaukonen
- Paul Kelly
- Carole King
- David Knopfler
- Mark Knopfler
- Ray LaMontagne
- Ronnie Lane
- Gordon Lightfoot
- Philip Lindholm
- Shane MacGowan
- Bill Madden
- Laura Marling
- John Martyn
- Dave Matthews
- Mark McCafferty
- Country Joe McDonald
- Shelagh McDonald
- Don McLean
- James McMurtry
- Ralph McTell
- Joni Mitchell
- Jason Molina
- Van Morrison
- Alexi Murdoch
- Graham Nash
- Fred Neil
- Joanna Newsom
- Nico
- Conor Oberst
- Phil Ochs
- Tom Paxton
- Ben Parcell
- Patrick Park
- Phillip Phillips
- Shawn Phillips
- John Prine
- Gerry Rafferty
- Chuck Ragan
- Bonnie Raitt
- Mary Ramsey
- Willis Alan Ramsey
- Damien Rice
- Josh Ritter
- Sixto Rodriguez
- Mike Rosenberg
- Ryan Ross
- Emma Ruth Rundle
- Tom Rush
- Andrew Scott
- John Sebastian
- Paul Siebel
- Judee Sill
- Paul Simon
- Langhorne Slim
- P. F. Sloan
- Todd Snider
- Bruce Springsteen
- Cat Stevens
- Sufjan Stevens
- Laura Stevenson
- Al Stewart
- John Stewart
- Alan Stivell
- Stephen Stills
- The Tallest Man on Earth
- James Taylor
- Lynda Thomas
- Richard Thompson
- Teddy Thompson
- Josh Tillman
- Eddie Vedder
- Suzanne Vega
- M. Ward
- Gillian Welch
- Emily Jane White
- Chelsea Wolfe
- Roddy Woomble
- Neil Young
- Warren Zevon
- Jack Savoretti
- Jaimin Rajani

== 1960s North American folk rock vocal groups ==
- The Band
- The Beach Boys
- The Beau Brummels
- Bermuda Triangle Band
- The Blue Things
- Buffalo Springfield
- Bunky and Jake
- The Byrds
- Country Joe and the Fish
- Creedence Clearwater Revival
- Crosby, Stills, Nash & Young
- The Grass Roots
- Ian & Sylvia
- Love
- The Lovin' Spoonful
- The Mamas & the Papas
- Mason Proffit
- The Rose Garden
- Peter, Paul and Mary
- Simon & Garfunkel
- Stone Poneys
- The Turtles
- We Five
- The Youngbloods

== British folk rock ==
- The Albion Band
- Comus
- Sandy Denny
- Fairport Convention
- Fotheringay
- Gryphon
- Roy Harper
- Hedgehog Pie
- Jack the Lad
- Jethro Tull
- Matthews Southern Comfort
- Jim Moray
- Oysterband
- Pentangle
- Radical Face
- Steeleye Span
- Richard Thompson
- Treetop Flyers

== Celtic rock ==
- Barleyjuice
- Alan Stivell
- Belfast Food
- Big Country
- Blackthorn
- Blaggards
- The Bluehorses
- Brother (Australian band)
- Carbon Leaf
- Celtas Cortos
- Christy Moore
- The Cranberries
- Coast
- The Corrs
- The Corries
- Dalriada
- Dan Ar Braz
- Sue Draheim
- The Dreaming
- Dropkick Murphys
- The Duhks
- The Elders
- Eluveitie
- Enter the Haggis
- The Fables
- Five Hand Reel
- Gaelic Storm
- Glengarry Bhoys
- Great Big Sea
- Horslips
- Irish Stew of Sindidun
- Ithilien
- Gerard Jaffrès
- JSD Band
- The Killdares
- Lehto and Wright
- Lindisfarne
- Luka Bloom
- Ashley MacIsaac
- The Men They Couldn't Hang
- Moving Hearts
- Neck
- Orthodox Celts
- The Paperboys
- Peat and Diesel
- The Proclaimers
- The Prodigals
- Prydein
- Red Cardell
- Roze Poze
- Runrig
- The Saw Doctors
- Scythian
- Seven Nations
- Spirit of the West
- The Tannahill Weavers
- Tempest
- Tir na n'Og
- Tri Yann
- The View
- The Waterboys
- Wolfstone

== Folk punk ==
- Against Me!
- Andrew Jackson Jihad
- Attila the Stockbroker
- Paul Baribeau
- Blackbird Raum
- Billy Bragg
- Captain Chaos
- Cordelia's Dad
- Kimya Dawson
- Days N' Daze
- The Dreadnoughts
- Filthy Thieving Bastards
- Patrik Fitzgerald
- The Front Bottoms
- Galloping Coroners
- Galloping Wonder Stag
- The Gaslight Anthem
- Gogol Bordello
- Jeffrey Lewis
- Johnny Hobo and the Freight Trains
- The Levellers
- The Menzingers
- Mischief Brew
- Mutiny
- The Newcranes
- New Model Army
- The Psalters
- Ramshackle Glory
- Mike Scott
- Sforzando
- Swamp Zombies
- Frank Turner
- This Bike Is a Pipe Bomb
- Violent Femmes
- Wingnut Dishwashers Union
- X-tal

=== Celtic punk ===
- Black 47
- Boiled in Lead
- The Briggs
- Dropkick Murphys
- Fiddler's Green
- Filthy Thieving Bastards
- Flatfoot 56
- Flogging Molly
- The Go Set
- Greenland Whalefishers
- Irish Stew of Sindidun
- Jackdaw
- The Mahones
- Mill a h-Uile Rud
- Mr. Irish Bastard
- Neck
- Paddy and the Rats
- Pipes and Pints
- The Pogues
- The Prodigals
- Les Ramoneurs de menhirs
- The Real McKenzies
- Roaring Jack
- The Rumjacks
- Shane MacGowan and The Popes
- Sir Reg
- SMZB
- Street Dogs
- Swingin' Utters
- The Tossers

== Uncategorized folk rock ==
- 10,000 Maniacs
- The 502s
- 54-40
- The Accidentals
- Altan Urag
- Amaral
- Đorđe Balašević
- Barenaked Ladies
- The Bedridden
- Beirut
- Bela Fleck and the Flecktones
- The BibleCode Sundays
- Big Thief
- Bijelo Dugme
- Borknagar
- Bright Eyes
- Casa del Vento
- Celtas Cortos
- Cobirds Unite
- Continental Drifters
- Counting Crows
- Dah
- Dave Matthews Band
- The Decemberists
- Den Fule
- Den Za Den
- Design
- DeVotchKa
- Eclection
- Energy Orchard
- The Felice Brothers
- Fever Fever
- Fiddler's Green
- Bela Fleck
- Fleet Foxes
- Fleetwood Mac
- Flight of the Conchords
- Fly My Pretties
- Johnny Flynn
- A Fragile Tomorrow
- Faun
- Garavi Sokak
- Garmarna
- Gåte
- Gordon Giltrap
- Grace Potter and the Nocturnals
- The Grapes of Wrath
- The Greencards
- Griva
- Gundula Krause
- Hedningarna
- The Hooters
- Hrdza
- The Incredible String Band
- Indigo Girls
- The Infamous Stringdusters
- Los Jaivas
- James
- The Jayhawks
- John & Mary
- Juniper Tar
- Korni Grupa
- Leb i Sol
- Lost Dogs
- Lyube
- The Lumineers
- MagellanMusic
- Magna Carta
- Bill Mallonee
- Chris Mason
- Sandra McCracken
- McGraw & Fer
- Midlake
- Modena City Ramblers
- the Mountain Goats
- Mumford & Sons
- Neutral Milk Hotel
- Old Crow Medicine Show
- Original Harmony Ridge Creekdippers
- Andrew Osenga
- Otava Yo
- Over the Rhine
- Pesniary
- Phoenix (Romanian band)
- Jill Phillips
- R.E.M.
- The Rails
- Roaring Jack
- Rokeri s Moravu
- Ruby Blue
- Run River North
- S Vremena Na Vreme
- Schandmaul
- The Shells
- The Shins
- The Smiths
- Siniša Vuco
- Smak
- Elliott Smith
- Spiral Dance
- Aaron Sprinkle
- Steam Powered Giraffe
- Strawbs
- Kazuki Tomokawa
- The Tragically Hip
- Trees
- Trembling Bells
- Los Tres
- The Twilight Hours
- Two Gallants
- Varihnaz
- The Waifs
- Wagakki Band
- Derek Webb
- Weddings Parties Anything
- Andy White
- Wilco
- Denison Witmer
- David Wolfenberger
- The Wood Brothers
- Wu Tiao Ren
- YU Grupa

== See also ==
- List of folk metal bands
