= Mark Gormley =

American singer-songwriter (1957–2024)

- Born: May 7, 1957; Key West, Florida, U.S.
- Died: May 24, 2024 (aged 67) Pensacola, Florida, U.S.
- Genres: Outsider music, folk rock, soft rock
- Occupations: Musician, singer-songwriter
- Instruments: Vocals, guitar
- Label: UZ Media

Mark Donan Gormley (May 7, 1957 – May 24, 2024) was an American singer-songwriter from Pensacola, Florida, who achieved internet fame for his music videos on YouTube.

== Early years ==
Gormley learned to play the guitar as a teenager and later wrote and recorded a number of original compositions in the 1970s and 80s. His musical influences included Led Zeppelin, Bob Dylan, Rush, James Taylor, Jimi Hendrix, and Boston. During his time enlisted in the Marines, Gormley was stationed in Scotland where he recorded a demo for some of his songs, but he was unable to gain a recording contract on his return to the US.

== The Uncharted Zone ==
Having decided to give up pursuing a career as a musician, Gormley didn't release his music to the public until his first music video was filmed in 2006. Gormley was given a platform when his music videos appeared on The Uncharted Zone, a weekly public-access television music show that plays original and cover videos by local artists. The Uncharted Zone is shown on the Blab Television cable station and is based in the Gulf Coast of Florida. Gormley had since recorded a number of music videos for the show.

The low-budget music videos were produced by Phil Thomas Katt, a local musician and former radio DJ. The videos are characterized by their frequent use of green screen effects, local scenery and, quite often, comedic or dramatic story lines. Katt runs The Uncharted Zone with his co-host and longtime friend Tommy Robinetti. The two can be found introducing each video with quirky commentary and anecdotes about each featured artist.

In addition to the television broadcast, The Uncharted Zone began posting videos on YouTube in 2007. These videos gained popularity during 2009. In a 2010 interview, Phil Thomas Katt explained: “The videos had been on YouTube for a while, and then, last year, things really took off.” Thanks to these YouTube videos, Katt became a cult icon to a growing group of fans and fellow musicians, and Gormley was propelled to internet stardom.

In October 2010, Gormley received the first ever The Uncharted Zone 'Youzie Award'. The award signified Gormley becoming the first artist in The Uncharted Zone's history to have a music video surpass one million views on YouTube.

== Internet fame ==
Gormley's music videos have reached an audience of millions on YouTube. In an article on Gormley, UK-based newspaper Metro proclaimed "The internet has a new musical hero in the form of singer-songwriter Mark Gormley". Gormley and his music have been featured on the G4TV television program Attack of the Show!, and later G4TV's Web Soup, where "Weird Al" Yankovic performed an impression of Gormley. Gormley has been the inspiration for several fan-made videos, including remixes of his songs, cover versions, and parodies of his music videos. The standing posture adopted by Gormley in several of his music videos, known as the "Power Stance", became an internet meme.

Gormley had been asked to perform by concert bookers and TV shows including the late-night talk show Jimmy Kimmel Live!, but he decided to decline the offers. Gormley avoided the spotlight and was notoriously reclusive. In an interview conducted by The Uncharted Zone's Michele Carnley, Gormley claimed "I'm just little old me from Pensacola." When asked about his sudden internet fame, Gormley replied "It's a bit overwhelming. You know, when I did this I just did it for fun. Something to do, something therapeutic."

== Music videos ==
Gormley's debut music video is for the song "Beginnings", which includes still images of scenery in his native Pensacola. The music video features an appearance by model Ashton Shane, who is also a VJ for The Uncharted Zone. Woot found the song "thought-provoking" and noted the profound insights offered by the lyrics. Gormley considered the song his personal favorite.

The "Little Wings" music video includes footage of seagulls in flight, as Gormley sings in front of ocean scenes. Gormley and his music video for "Little Wings" were featured on the website of Colorado-based newspaper Westword, who remarked "there's something strangely appealing about Gormley...I have to say that this song is actually pretty great". Videogum listed the "Little Wings" music video as one of the best viral videos of 2009. As of September 2013, "Little Wings" has received over one million views on YouTube. In December 2013, "Little Wings" was featured on the ITV2 television show MC Hammer's Big Shot Academy.

"Gray Days" is one of Gormley's darkest songs, that LimeLife referred to as a "moving, Zeppelinesque tribute". "Gray Days" and "Little Wings" were featured on the website of Seattle-based newspaper The Stranger, who argued that although the quality of Gormley's videos had garnered him much of the initial attention, "what really should be considered is his music, for all the right reasons, as credit is due...his voice and his song writing certainly shoot for the realms of greatness" adding that "his song writing and voice approach the league of rock's finest angelic singers", comparing his vocals to Jon Anderson, Bryan MacLean, and Tim Buckley.

The music video for "Stars" shows Gormley performing the song while backed by footage of the night sky and the beaches of Perdido Key, Florida.

Gormley's breakthrough music video is for "Without You", released in 2008. "Without You" is a love song about heartbreak and loneliness that music website The Daily Swarm described as a "soft metal masterpiece". Alternative culture magazine Coilhouse called the track "an honest, well-crafted song" and noted Gormley's "soulful voice". Pensacola News Journal described the music video as "a frenetic mix of Gormley, scenic backdrops and a lovely young lady". Media journal BuzzFeed considered "Without You" to be a contender for 'Video of the Year' and listed it among the 'Most Memorable Amateur Music Videos of the 2000s'. On January 14, 2009, "Without You" was named a viral video by music magazine Blender and Comedy Central. On January 16, 2009, "Without You" was the daily featured music video on the website Today's BIG Thing. Later that same year, it was featured on G4's Web Soup where Gormley would shortly be parodied by the show's guest "Weird Al" Yankovic. The music video achieved cult status through word-of-mouth and blog posts. When asked about the success of "Without You", Phil Thomas Katt stated: “It spread like wildfire. I started hearing from folks all over the country. Mark never cared about being a celebrity, but the interest was there.” In January 2011, "Without You" was featured on truTV's The Smoking Gun Presents: World's Dumbest Performers #6. Commentators on the music video included actor Daniel Baldwin, comedian Loni Love, and writers Billy Kimball and Michael Loftus. Loni Love criticized Gormley's choice of clothing, whereas Michael Loftus commented "you don't expect him to have a golden throat like that". In September 2012 and January 2013, "Without You" was featured on the Channel 4 television program Rude Tube, including an interview with Phil Thomas Katt. As of February 2022, "Without You" has received over four million views on YouTube.

Gormley's missed opportunities and sudden fame were parodied in the music video for "The Cries in Our Eyes". During the course of the video, Gormley is depicted performing in front of famous landmarks from around the world and being photographed by paparazzi. According to Missouri newsweekly Riverfront Times, the music video created "the Mark Gormley tour that could have been".

The music video for "Sing Me Your Song" largely takes place on the Moon and in space. The video capitalized on Gormley's success by featuring product placement for the Cheetos snack food. Music website Video Static described the song as "haunting" and praised the music videos use of product placement. Gormley opted to receive no money from the product placement deal, giving all revenue to The Uncharted Zone to help them during the difficult economy.

Gormley's music video for the song "All We Need" was released on June 27, 2010. It marks the final music video from his debut album. Gormley planned to write and record new songs in the future, and in February 2014 he began working on new songs at The Uncharted Zone's recording studio. A Mark Gormley DVD is also in production.

The music video for the song "Together" was released on February 7, 2017. The video features Gormley in space and on the beach. Phil Thomas Katt has explained the reason behind the near seven year wait for Gormley's new music video: “Mark Gormley’s been slowly working on new tunes since his last hit in 2010. The recording process with Mark is extremely slow. He generally only works about 20 minutes per session.”

== Recordings ==
Gormley's self-titled debut album of original recordings was released via The Uncharted Zone.

== Death ==
Gormley died in Pensacola on May 24, 2024, at the age of 67.

== See also ==
- Internet celebrity
- Outsider music
- List of folk rock artists
