= Casa del Vento =

Italian folk rock band

Casa del vento
- Origin: Arezzo, Italy
- Genres: Folk rock combat folk patchanka
- Years active: 1991 – present
- Labels: Mescal Records; EMI; Sony Music Entertainment; Sony BMG
- Members: Luca Lanzi, Sauro Lanzi, Massimiliano Gregorio, Fabrizio Morganti, Andreas Petermann, Riccardo Dellocchio
- Website: www.casadelvento.eu

Casa del vento is a left wing Italian folk rock band.

== History ==
Casa del Vento is an "extremely controversial, Italo-Celtic, Euro-socialist" folk rock band founded in Italy in 1991. Its current members are Luca Lanzi, Sauro Lanzi, Massimiliano Gregorio, Fabrizio Morganti, Andreas Petermann and Riccardo Dellocchio. The band's popular albums are Pane E Rose, Sessant Anni Di Resistenza and Tbc.

Casa del Vento is influenced from Modena City Ramblers (MCR) founded by emilian boys on 17 March 1991, on Saint Patrick's Day to play Celtic songs in patchanka style, which influenced the most the Italian folk rock in the last 15 years. MCR's first demo-tape was Combat Folk: a musical manifesto: a fusion of Combat Rock by The Clash and folk: traditional Irish excerpt, political songs (Contessa) and partisans' songs (Fischia il vento and Bella Ciao) rearranged with Irish sound. Combat folk will be a new musical genre: folk rock with a strong political and social message. Later M.C.R. travelled in South America, Morocco, Palestine and South Africa, world sound met rock, punk, loops and samples: the new genre is Celtic patchanka which is a mixture of traditional music, punk, reggae, rock and political lyrics. The singer of the group Cisco along with producer Kaba Cavazzuti who also became "a new member of the Modena City Ramblers after changes in the original line-up", released the album of the ‘brother band’ Casa del Vento, titled "900" which came out in February 2001.

They have been contributed to the 17 track Fuori dal Mucchio "Combat Folk Vol. 2" compilation album (every band 2 track and 1 extra song by Modena City Ramblers) and reviewed as "a young five piece band with strong voice and interesting arrangements".

In 2002, band's Carne da cannone song were published as 7th track in compilation album Tora! Tora! '02 by Mescal Records. tora tora 2002 album

In March 2009, their song Il fuoco e la neve, is selected to the L’Altraradio's Golden Playlist compilation CD published by Repertoire Records.

Casa del Vento is one of the leading artists of Mescal Records (founded 1993).

== Members ==
- Luca Lanzi: vocals, acoustic guitar
- Sauro Lanzi: fiati, accordion, trumpet, trombone, tin whistle, piano, organ
- Massimiliano Gregorio: bass guitar
- Fabrizio Morganti: percussions
- Andreas Petermann: violin, viola
- Riccardo Dellocchio: electric guitar

== Discography ==
- 1999 - Senza bandiera Self Production
- 1999-2001 (?) - A las barricadas Mescal/Sony Music Entertainment
- 2001 - 900 (Stefano "Cisco" Bellotti) Mescal/Sony Music Entertainment
- 2002 - Genova chiama Mescal Records/ Il Manifesto
- 2002 - Pane e rose Mescal Records/Sony BMG
- 2003 - Non in mio nome (EP) Mescal/Sony Music Entertainment
- 2004 - Sessant'anni di Resistenza Mescal - Provincia di Arezzo e Comunità Montana/Sony Music Entertainment
- 2005 - Al di là degli alberi Mescal/Sony Music Entertainment
- 2006 - Il grande niente Mescal/Sony BMG
- 2008 - Il fuoco e la neve 2 CD (Casa del Vento compilation) Mescal/EMI
- 2009 - Articolo Uno Mescal/Sony BMG
- 2010 - Seeds In The Wind 5-track cd issued exclusively to be sold through Emergency channels
- 2012 - Giorni dell'Eden Mescal/Sony BMG

== Participations ==
- 2001 Italia tour with Roger Lucey
- 11 April 2009 Pratovecchio (Arezzo) "SCArtati" concert

== See also ==
- Modena City Ramblers
- List of folk rock artists
