= Cuéntame un cuento =

Studio album by Celtas Cortos
- Genre: Rock
- Length: 43:46
- Producer: Juan Ignacio Cuadrado

Cuéntame un cuento ('Tell me a story') is the third album published by the Spanish rock band Celtas Cortos. It was published in 1991 by the DRO and marked the point at which the band reached a mass audience. It sold over 500,000 copies.

The album contains songs such as "20 de abril" and the album's title track, which helped the band win the Ondas Award for the revelation group of 1991.

== Track list ==
1. El ritmo del mar
2. Trágame tierra
3. ¡¡Ya está bien!!
4. El alquimista loco
5. Si te gusta
6. ¡¡Más kilómetros!!
7. 20 de abril
8. El pelotazo
9. Cuéntame un cuento
10. Onda Caribe 10.5 (Muévete brother aquí y ahora)
11. Aguantando el tirón
12. Vals de la poltrona

== Credits ==
- Executive producer: Juan Ignacio Cuadrado

Celtas Cortos

- Nacho Martín
- Carlos Soto
- Goyo Yeves
- Alberto García
- Oscar García
- Jesús H. Cifuentes
- César Cuenca
- Nacho Castro
- Eduardo Pérez
