= Mr. Irish Bastard =

Irish folk punk band from Germany

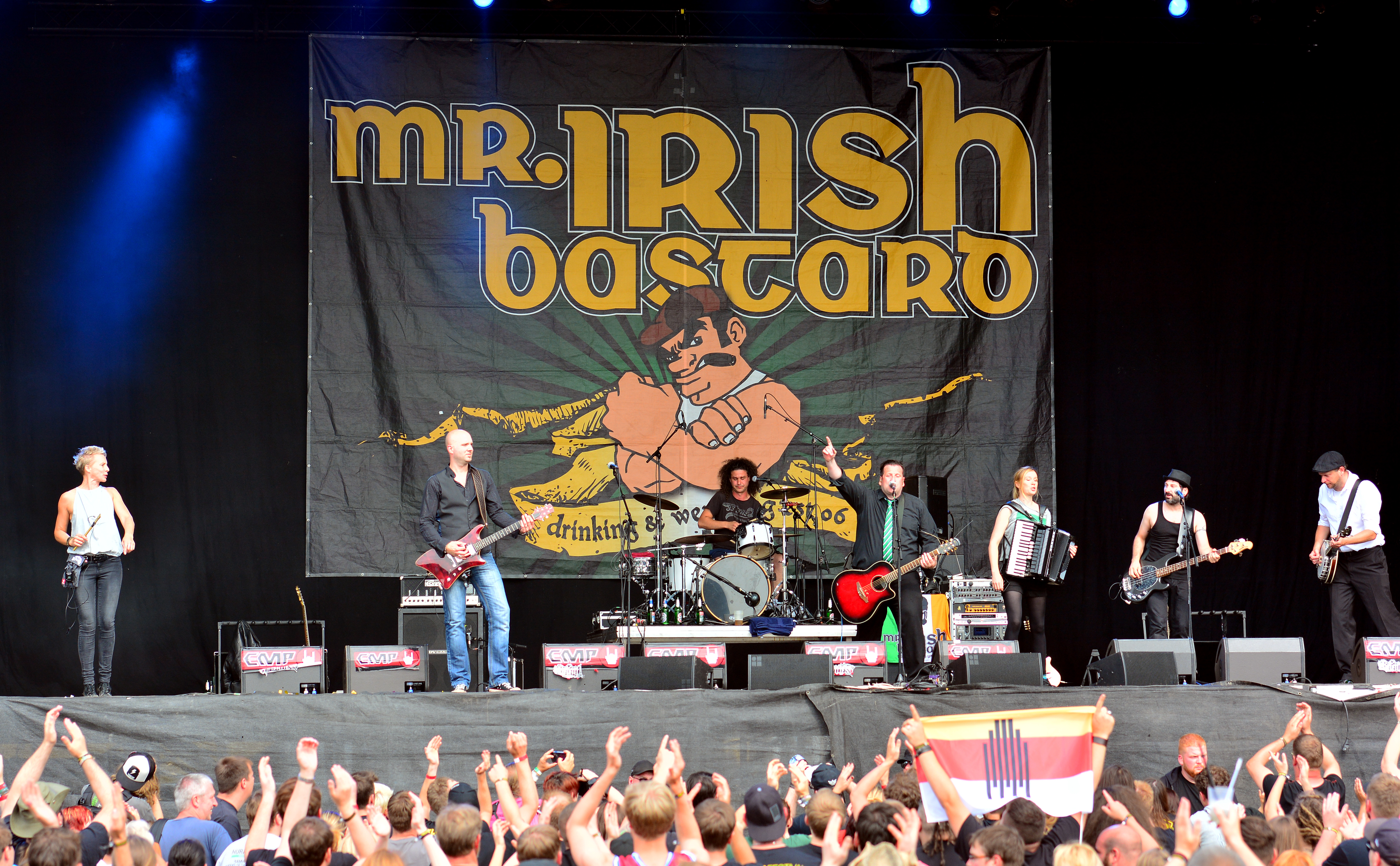
Mr. Irish Bastard
- Origin: Münster, Germany
- Genres: Rock, folk rock, folk punk
- Years active: 2006–present
- Labels: Reedo Records, Mad Drunken Monkey Records, I Hate People Records, (Germany), Proletopia Records (China), Uncle Owen Records (Japan)
- Members: The Irish Bastard (Himself): vocals, guitar Hatey Katey: tin whistle Gran E.Smith: banjo, mandolin Boeuf Strongenuff: bass guitar Ivo K’Nivo: drums Paddy Eyepole: accordion P: guitar Moe Leicester: guitar
- Past members: Ron Calli: drums Dominik Bröcker: drums Henrik Wächter: guitar Mitch Mackes: guitar The Dutch Irish Bastard: accordion Herb Random: accordion Itchy Quetchy: accordion Lady Lily: tin whistle
- Website: www.myspace.com/mririshbastard

Mr. Irish Bastard is an Irish folk punk band from Münster, Germany.

== History ==
The Band was founded in the middle of 2006 by the singer The Irish Bastard (Himself), the banjo player Gran E. Smith and Lady Lily on tin whistle. These three had already played together in another band with strong folk influences. The bass guitarist Boeuf Strongenuff, with whom The Irish Bastard had also been playing in a band for years, were recruited for this project. Other band members were Ron Calli and Mitch Mackes. Increasing success, coupled with immense touring, led to many changes in the lineup within the first few months. By now, the four founding members and drummer Ivo K’Nivo were the fixed lineup, who are supported by the “Travelling Bastards” Itchy Quetchy (Accordion) and the guitar players P or Moe Leicester. Sometimes, former members of the band still join them on stage. By now, a loyal fan community and a first unofficial fan club, the “Mr. Irish Bastard Street Team”, had been established and the band plays to audiences of up to 6,000 people (e.g. at the “Open Flair” festival, see Eschwege).

== Music ==
Musically Mr. Irish Bastard are influenced by bands like The Pogues, Flogging Molly, Dropkick Murphys as well as classic punk bands. These roots are linked in a unique way while also often using other musical styles, like ska for example. This breaking down of genre borders is also expressed in innovative cover versions of popular songs like Ricky Martin’s “Livin’ la Vida Loca”, The Cure’s “Why Can’t I be You?” or “Temple of Love”, originally by The Sisters of Mercy. Nevertheless, Irish influences prevail and traditional songs like Galway Bay (song) or Dirty Old Town are often played. The band members name Sepultura, Portishead (band), Social Distortion, German Oi! band Broilers and German comedy musician Helge Schneider as their personal influences.

== Releases and tours ==
=== Releases ===
After publishing their first EP St. Mary’s School of Drinking, which the band sold over 3,000 times on their own, the debut album The Bastard Brotherhood was released in early 2008. Both CDs were published on the band’s own record label Reedo Records. By now, The Bastard Brotherhood is available in its second edition after the first edition was sold out exceptionally quickly. Special collectors' vinyl record versions of both CDs are now also available at Mad Drunken Monkey Records. Further releases followed in Japan; here, the University of Hard Knocks CD was released on Uncle Owen Records in November 2008, and China, where Fortune & Glory was released in March 2009 on Proletopia Records.

Their album A Fistful of Dirt was released on Reedo Records on April 23, 2010. Mr. Irish Bastard are also featured on the Almost St. Patrick’s Day, Almost St. Patrick’s Day, Vol. II (both in Germany) and Rising Suns (Japan) samplers. American audiences may be familiar with their song "Everything Must Die" that was featured in the independent film Townies by Boston filmmaker Mike O’Dea. A live video of their song "Last Pint" was issued on the DVD to the "Tribal Area DVD-Mag No. 8" in SLAM alternative music magazine.

The band's latest release, Never Mind The Bastards - Here Is Mr. Irish Bollocks, is a cover version of the album Never Mind the Bollocks, Here's the Sex Pistols by British punk band The Sex Pistols.

=== Tours ===
Only two months after being founded, the band was invited to tour Europe with the Levellers (band). A headliner tour with sold out venues as well as a tour with the German speed folk/folk rock band Fiddler’s Green followed in fall 2007 through spring 2008. Further concerts as headliners followed throughout 2008 when they also joined The Mahones on some of their shows. On these and other occasions, Mr. Irish Bastard’s accordion player – by then, “The Dutch Irish Bastard” – would join The Mahones on stage too. In January 2009, they played a full length concert on the German TV-channel “Kanal 21”. This show is also available on DVD. After touring Germany intensively in 2009 and playing many rock festivals like the “Open Flair”, “Vainstream Rockfest” or “Serengeti”, many concerts were scheduled all over Germany for 2010. Shows have been played in Italy, Austria, Switzerland and the Netherlands. In September 2009 two shows were also played in England when participating in the "Best of Both Worlds" festival at Redhill, Surrey (September 26) and Brighton (September 27).

== Reception ==
The readers of the German Celtic-Rock online magazine acknowledged the band's style by voting them "German Celtic Folk Rock and Folk Punk band of the year" in 2007, followed by a second place in 2008 and a third place in 2009 in the same category. In addition, Bastard Brotherhood was voted second in the category "album of the year" and the song "Let Go" came in third in the "Song of the Year" category in 2008. In the "Best Live Act" category, the band took third place in 2009.

Their cover of "God Save the Queen" from the album Never Mind The Bastards - Here Is Mr. Irish Bollocks has been issued on a compilation by the Zillo Medieval print magazine. It was praised by the magazine's reviewer who preferred Mr. Irish Bastard's style to The Pogues, Flogging Molly and the Dropkick Murphys.

== Band members ==
Mr. Irish Bastard live at Rockharz 2019

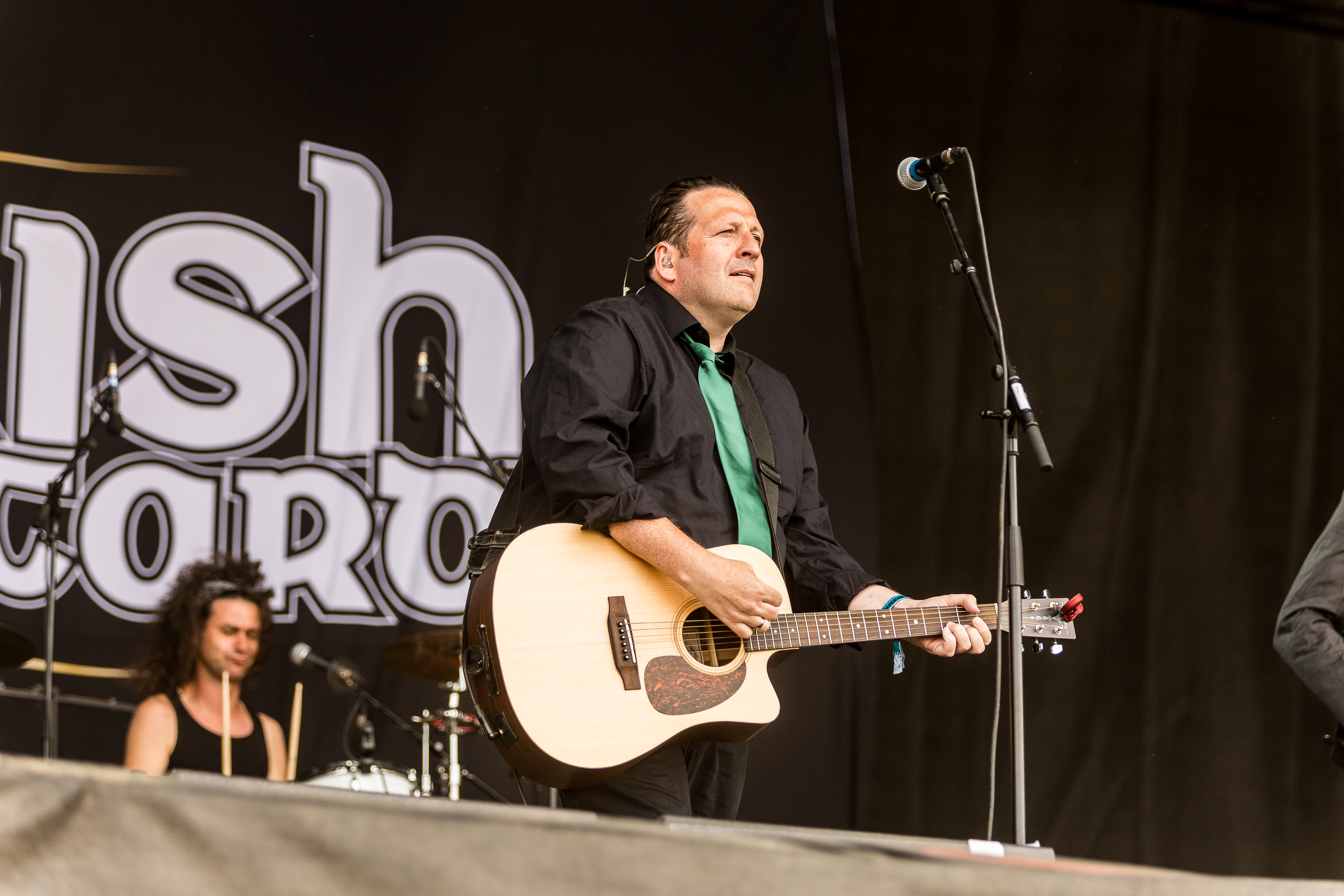
Singer and Guitarist Mr. Irish Bastard

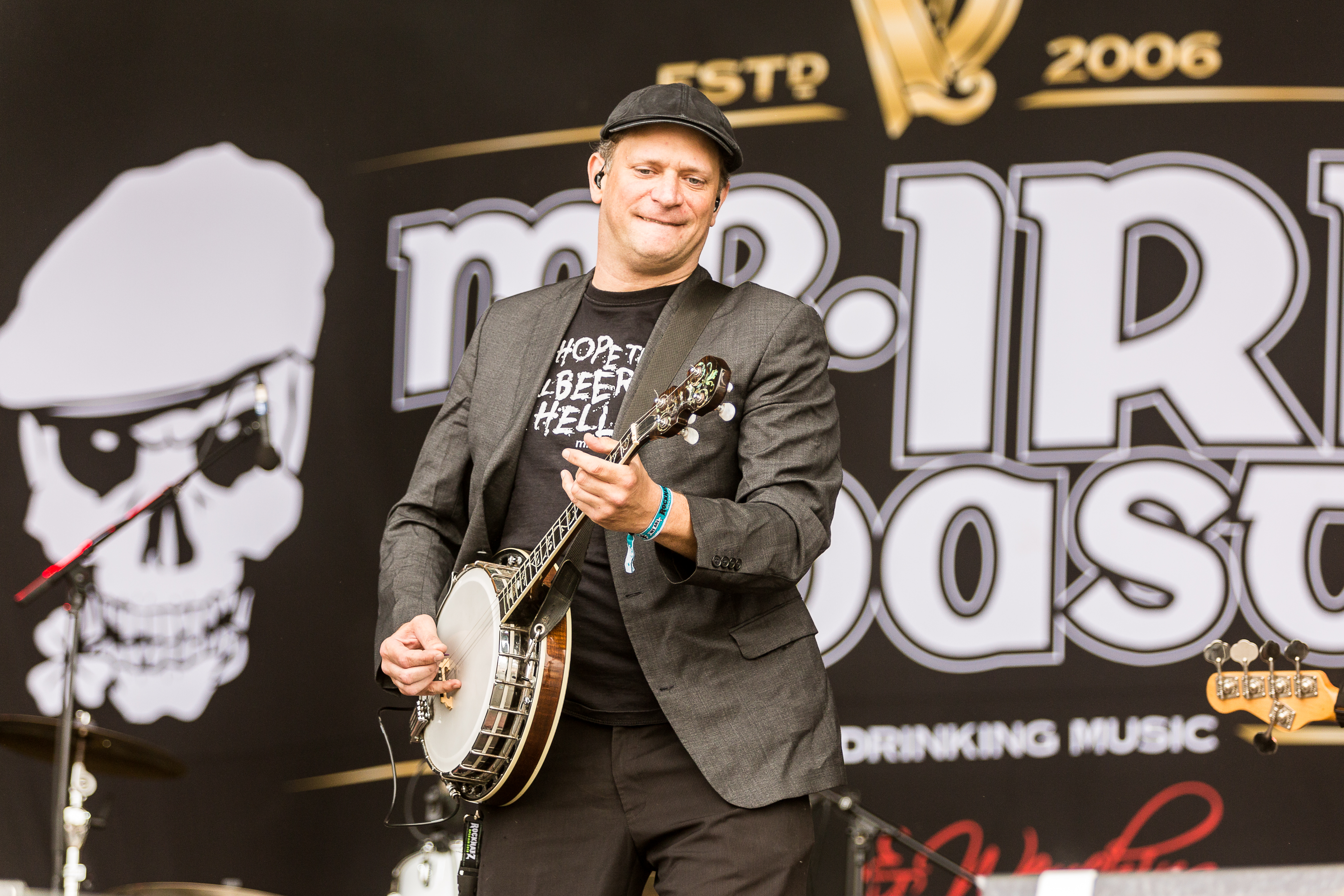
Banjo player Gran E. Smith

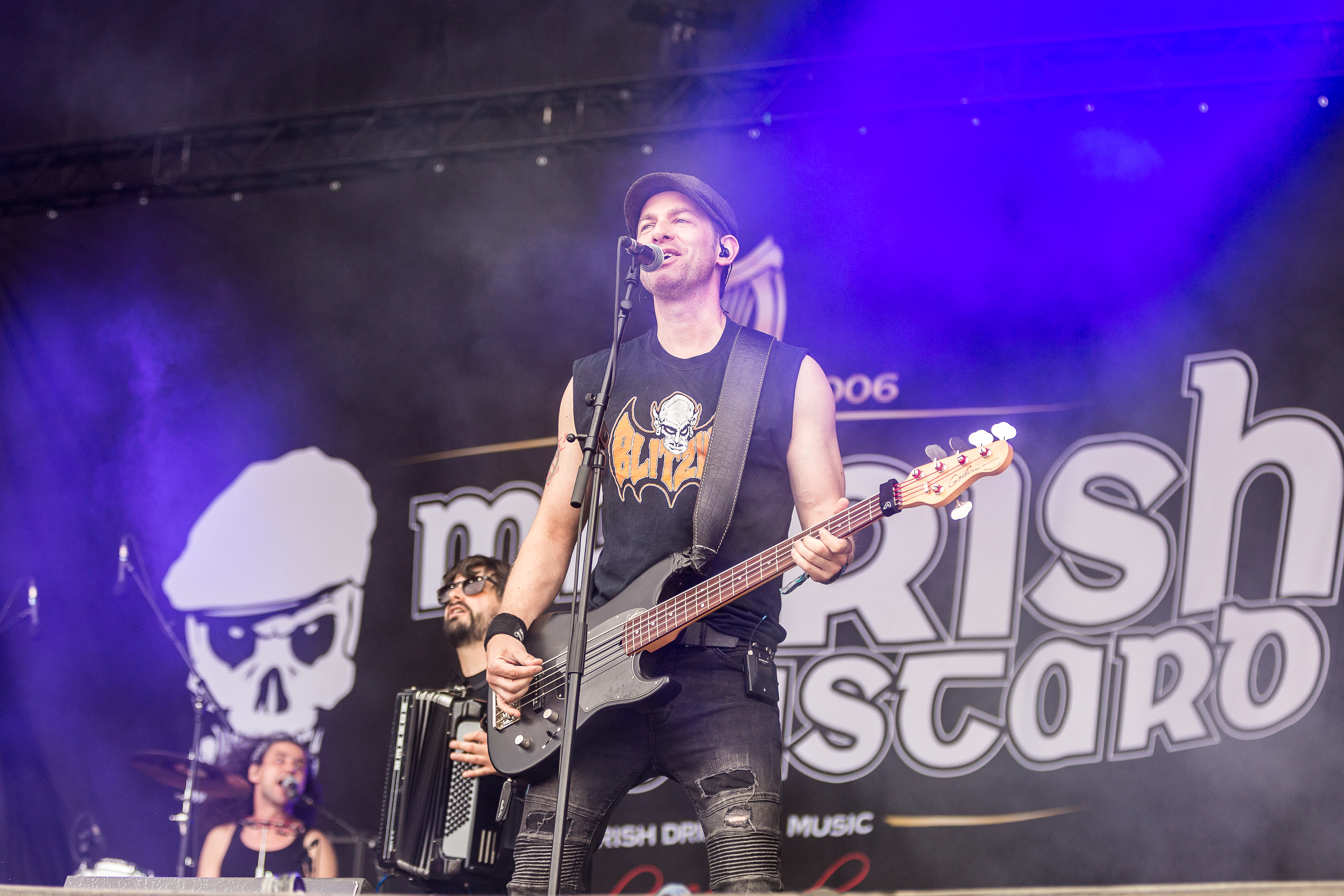
Bassist Boeuf Strongenuff

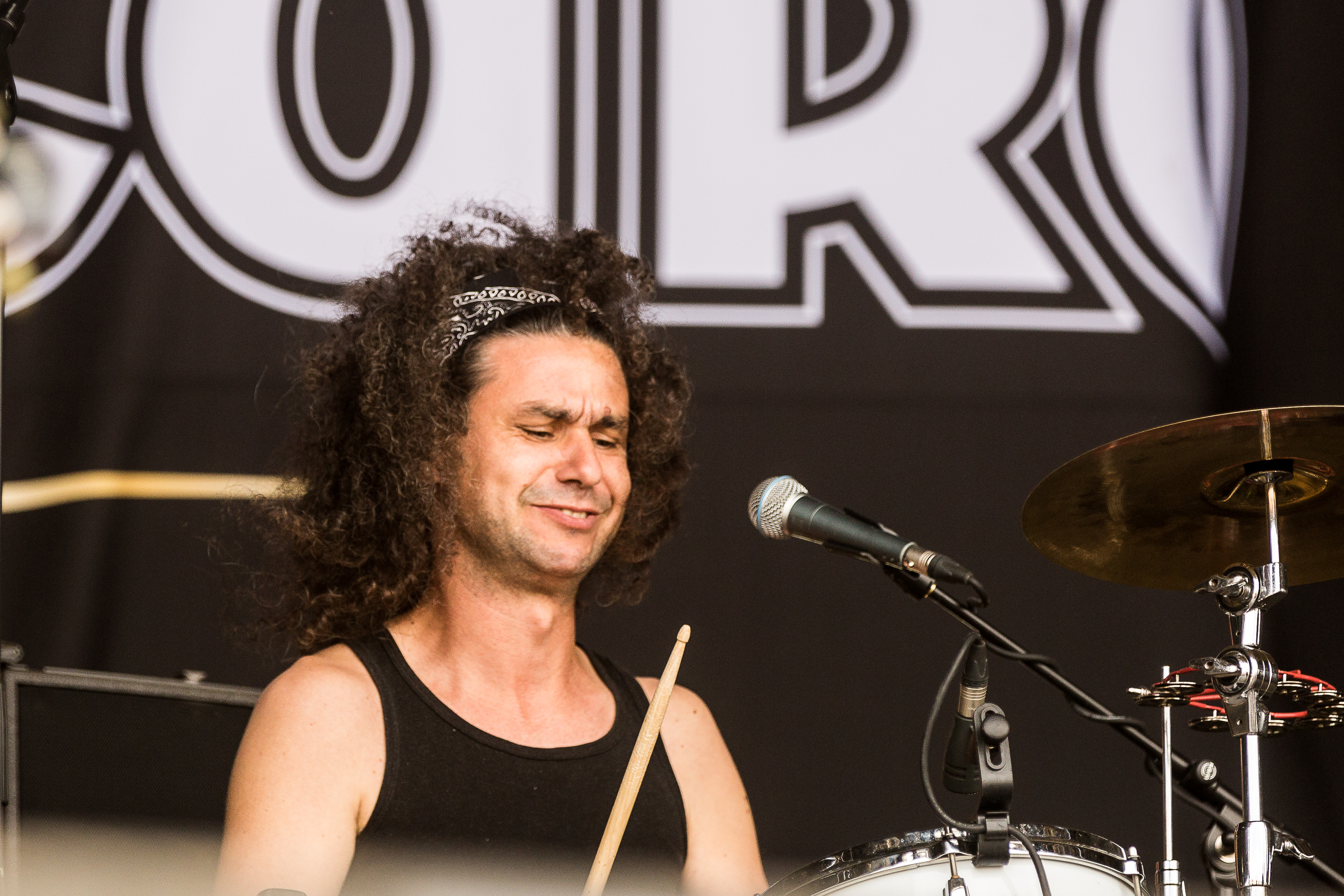
Drummer Ivo K'Nivo

== Discography ==
=== Studio albums ===
- The Bastard Brotherhood – 2008
- University of Hard Knocks – 2008 (Japan)
- Fortune & Glory – 2009 (China)
- A Fistful of Dirt – 2010
- Never Mind The Bastards - Here Is Mr. Irish Bollocks – 2011
- The World, The Flesh & The Devil – 2015
- The Desire for Revenge – 2018
- Battle Songs of the Damned – 2024

=== Compilations ===
- Almost St. Patrick's Day – 2007
- Rising Suns – 2009
- Almost St. Patrick's Day, Vol. II – 2009
- Zillo Medieval CD 2/12 – 2012

=== EPs ===
- St. Mary's School of Drinking – 2006

=== DVDs ===
- Fernsehkonzert Mr. Irish Bastard 15.01.2009 - 2009

=== Vinyl ===
- "St. Mary's School of Drinking" - 2009
- "The Bastard Brotherhood" - 2009
- "A Fistful of Dirt" - 2009 (available in USA at Interpunk)
- "I Smell The Blood" - 2011 7"
- "Never Mind The Bastards - Here Is Mr. Irish Bollocks" - 2011

=== Participations ===
- Soundtrack for Townies (Everything must Die)
- Tribal Area DVD-Mag No. 8 (Last Pint)
