= Modena City Ramblers =

Italian folk rock group

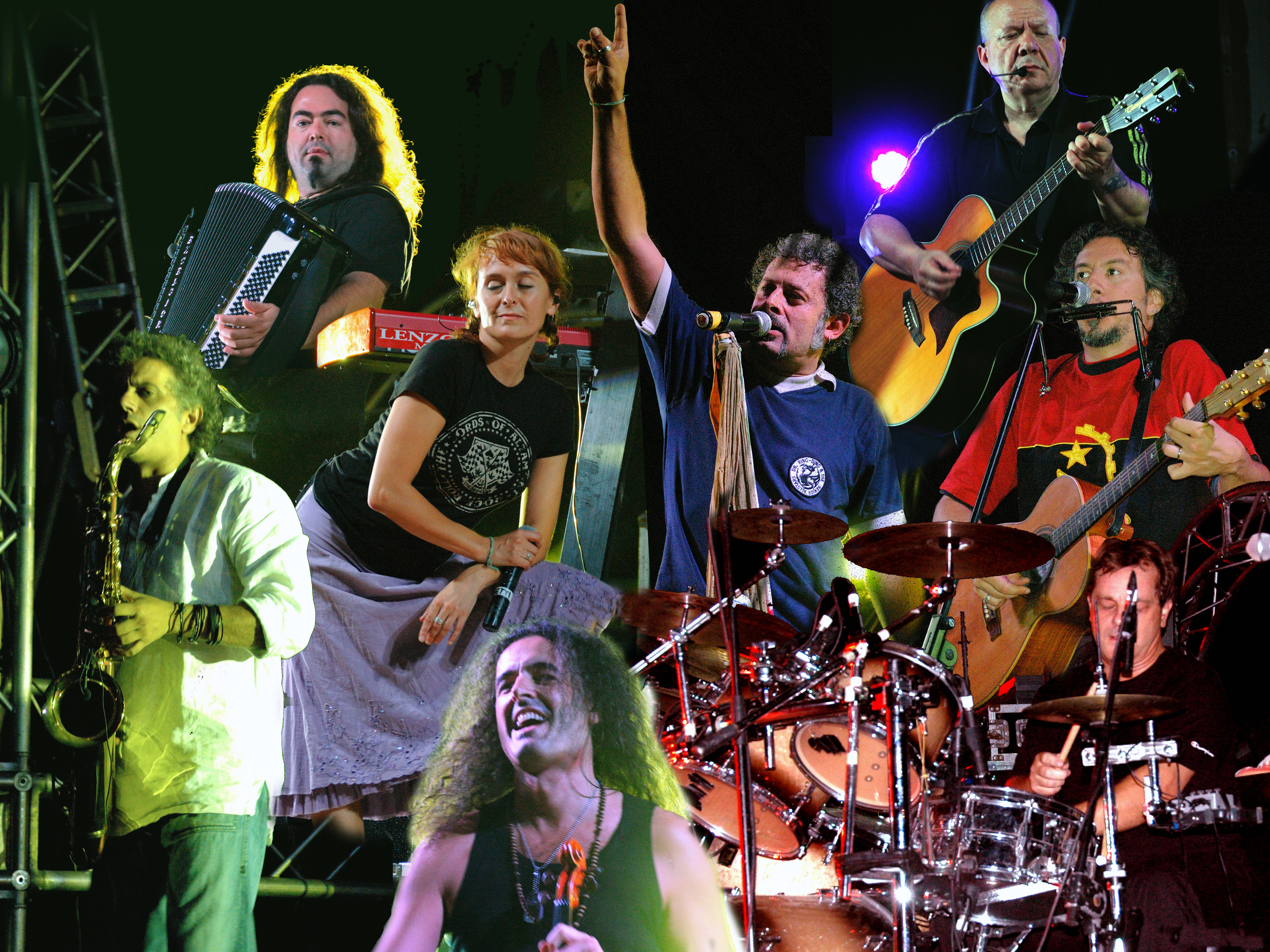
- Collage of the members of the Modena City Ramblers; Photographer and creator of collage: Roberto Scorta

Background information
- Origin: Modena, Emilia-Romagna, Italy
- Genres: Folk rock; folk
- Years active: 1991–present
- Members: Arcangelo "Kaba" Cavazzuti; Elisabetta "Betty" Vezzani; Davide "Dudu" Morandi; Francesco "Fry" Moneti; Franco D'Aniello; Massimo "Ice" Ghiacci; Roberto Zeno; Sara Troccolo
- Past members: Luca "Gabibbo" Giacometti; Stefano "Cisco" Bellotti; Alberto Cottica; Luciano Gaetani; Massimo Giuntini; Marco Michelini; Alberto Morselli; Giovanni Rubbiani
- Website: ramblers.it

Modena City Ramblers (also known as M.C.R.) is an Italian folk rock band founded in 1991. Their music is heavily influenced by Celtic themes, and can be compared to folk rock music. The band has sold over 500,000 albums. Known for their left-wing politics, their lyrics often speak out against the Mafia and fascism.

== Biography ==
We started as a hobby, for fun pure and simple. We had a punk vibe, we went and played without even rehearsing, sometimes we were six, sometimes seven, even eleven.

— Franco D'Aniello

The Modena City Ramblers were formed in 1991 by a group of friends who wanted to play traditional Irish music. The first to join were Alberto Morselli, Giovanni Rubbiani and Alberto Cottica (previously in Lontano da dove), Chris Dennis (formerly a member of Nomadi), Filippo Chieli, Franco D'Aniello and Luciano Gaetani from 'Abazia dei folli. On Saint Patrick's Day in 1991, during a concert in a pub in Modena, they chose the name Modena City Ramblers. The name was a homage to Dublin City Ramblers, an Irish band.

In 1992, they were joined by bassist Massimo Ghiacci (formerly in the band Plutonium 99). During the evening of 1 March, they recorded their first demo. During a concert at a pub in Carpi, Stefano "Cisco" Bellotti sang "The Wild Rover" for the first time. At this time the Modena City Ramblers became an open company, and have remained so during throughout their history, with almost all members who have left the band returning sporadically to play with the group. Their most famous concert was performed as the opening act for the Pogues in Modena. Their repertoire has since expanded considerably, including traditional Italian songs such as "Bella ciao", "Fischia il vento", and "Contessa".

The singer of the group Cisco, along with producer Kaba Cavazzuti, who also became "a new member of the Modena City Ramblers after changes in the original line-up", released the album of the ‘brother band’ Casa del Vento, titled "900" which came out in February 2001.

== Members ==
The band's lineup has changed many times since its formation. After the first album, singer Alberto Morselli left the band; in 1996, Francesco Moneti replaced Marco Michelini, and Giovanni Rubbiani and Alberto Cottica left the band in 2001. Singer Stefano "Cisco" Bellotti left the band in 2005 after fourteen years. The lineup in 2006 was:

- Davide "Dudu" Morandi: singer, bass, acoustic and electric guitar, banjo, glockenspiel, harmonica
- Elisabetta "Betty" Vezzani: singer, acoustic and electric guitar, tambourine, mandolin
- Massimo "Ice" Ghiacci: acoustic and electric bass, double bass, tea chest bass, sax, backing vocals, acoustic guitar
- Franco D'Aniello: flute, tin whistle, trumpet, sax, backing vocals, acoustic guitar, glockenspiel, percussion
- Francesco "Fry" Moneti: acoustic and electric guitar, acoustic, electric and Indian violin, banjo, oud, mandolin, backing vocals
- Roberto Zeno: drums, percussion, backing vocals, mandolin, acoustic guitar and piano
- Arcangelo "Kaba" Cavazzuti: drums, percussion, acoustic guitar, bass, charango, piano, trumpet, shaker, banjo, backing vocals
- Luca "Gabibbo" Giacometti (died in 2007): bouzouki, mandolin, banjo, acoustic guitar, backing vocals

== Discography ==
=== Album ===
- 1994 – Riportando tutto a casa
- 1996 – La grande famiglia
- 1997 – Terra e libertà
- 1998 – Raccolti
- 1999 – Fuori campo
- 2002 – Radio Rebelde
- 2004 – ¡Viva la vida, muera la muerte!
- 2005 – Appunti partigiani
- 2006 – Dopo il lungo inverno
- 2008 – Bella ciao – Italian Combat Folk for the Masses
- 2009 – Onda libera
- 2011 – Sul tetto del mondo
- 2013 – Niente di nuovo sul fronte occidentale
- 2014 – Venti
- 2015 – Tracce Clandestine

=== EPs ===
- 1998 – Cent'anni di solitudine
- 1999 – L'Italia ai tempi dei Modena City Ramblers
- 2003 – Modena City Remix
- 2003 – Gocce (for Acqua per la Pace)
- 2004 – El presidente

=== Rarities ===
- 1992 – On the first day of March...Live demo – autoproduced demotape
- 1993 – Combat Folk – autoproduced demotape
- 2000 – Il resto raccolto – recorded only for fan club

=== DVD ===
- 2004 – Clan Banlieue – twelve years of songs, concerts, interviews, journey, unreleased videos

=== Participations ===
- 1995 – Tributo ad Augusto (CGD) – with L'atomica cinese
- 1995 – Materiale resistente – with Bella ciao
- 1995 – I disertori – a tribute to Ivano Fossati – play Gli amanti d'Irlanda
- 1999 – A come Ambiente (La Stampa)- with Madre Terra
- 2002 – Piazza Carlo Giuliani ragazzo – with La legge giusta (inspired by the 27th G8 summit)
- 2002 – Lontano – by Landscape Prayers
- 2003 – Balla veloce vivi lento – with Le lucertole del folk
- 2007 – Tre colori by Graziano Romani – with Spiriti Liberi; Stesso Viaggio Stessa Città; Corre Buon Sangue.
- 2007 – Nessuno oltraggi nessuno – with Socialdemocrazia by Gang, live version.

== Collaborations ==
- Several of the Ramblers' songs, such as "Cent'anni di solitudine", "Macondo Express", and "Remedios la Bella" are inspired by the 1967 novel One Hundred Years of Solitude (Spanish: Cien años de soledad) by Nobel Prize-winning Colombian author Gabriel García Márquez.
- The song "Il bicchiere dell'addio" features Irish singer Bob Geldof. The Ramblers later recorded a version of "The Great Song of Indifference" in Emiliano-Romagnolo language, inspired by Geldof's version 1990 hit from Vegetarians of Love album.
- The Ramblers' album Appunti Partigiani features collaborations with many artists, including Goran Bregović, Billy Bragg, Moni Ovadia, Piero Pelù, and Francesco Guccini.
