= The Newcranes =

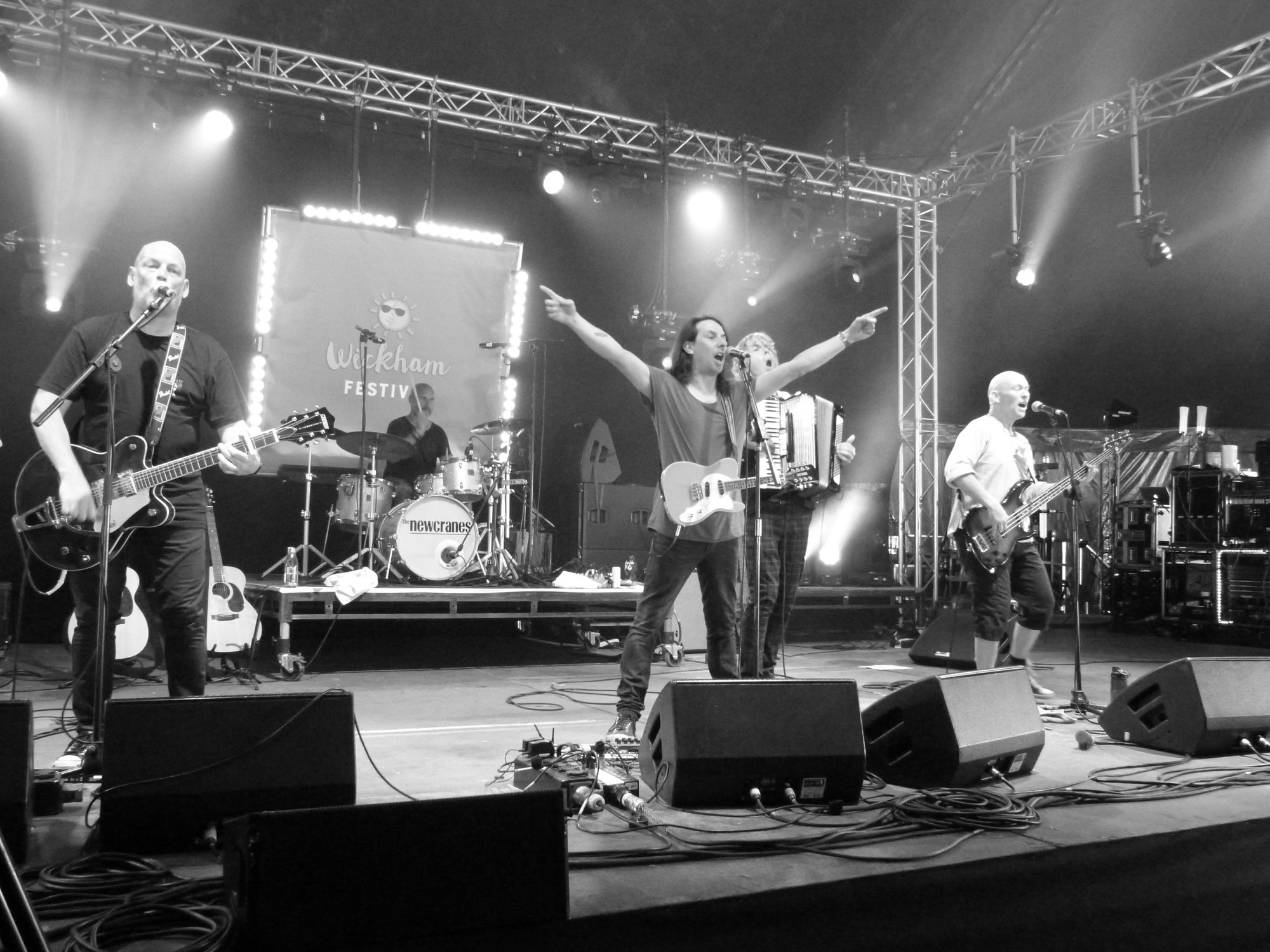
The Newcranes onstage at Wickham Festival 2019

The Newcranes are a British folk punk band, formed in Derby, England. They are frequently compared to the Levellers and other contemporary folk-rock groups such as The Men They Couldn't Hang. The Newcranes quickly became a popular band on the early 1990s touring circuit. They signed with French label Musidisc Records and recorded their debut album, Frontline, which garnered critical acclaim and won the band many followers. They subsequently supported The Mission, Stiff Little Fingers, Bob Dylan and The Saw Doctors, and went on to release several more EPs. The band disbanded in 1996 after several line-up changes. In 2018, the principal songwriter Mark Simpson, along with bass player Bob Rushton and drummer Marcus Carter decided to reignite the band after a campaign by fans. They recruited Jonny Wallis and Julian Butt and, in March 2019, they played a well-received reunion show at The Venue in Derby. The band have gone on to play festivals throughout the UK including Bearded Theory, Wickham Festival, Boomtown and YNot?.
In 2022 Marcus Carter decided to leave the band to concentrate on other projects, Giles Henshaw took his place as the master of the beat.

2024 saw the release of their long awaited first full album "Sing To The End Of The World" which also featured their new violinist Fi Fraser.

== Line-up ==
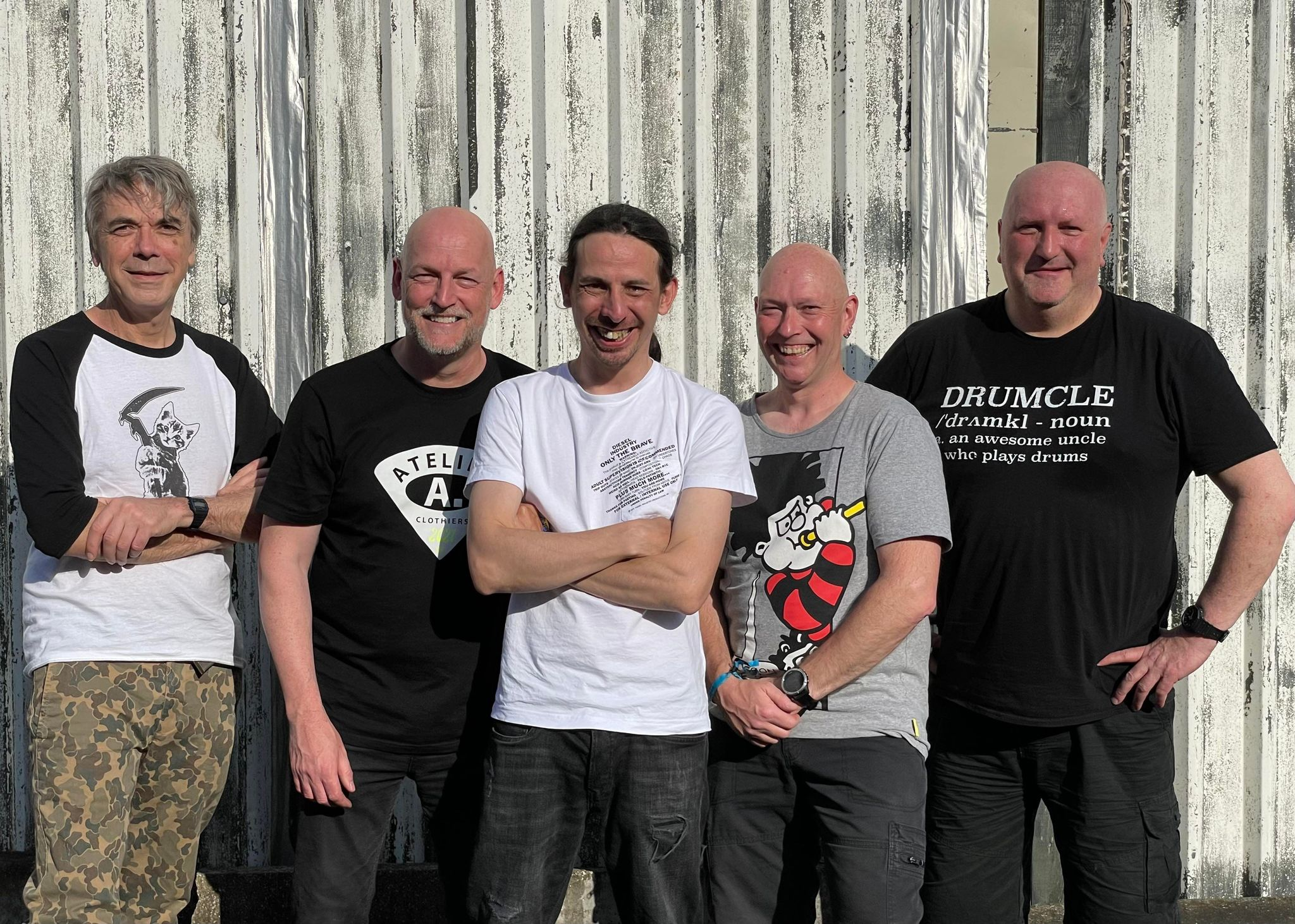
The Newcranes 2022 Left - RIght Julian Butt, Mark Simpson, Jonny Wallis, Bob Rushton, Giles Henshaw

Current:

- Mark Simpson: Guitars, Vocals, Mandolin, Harmonica
- Bob Rushton: Bass, Vocals
- Giles Henshaw: Drums,
- Jonny Wallis: Vocals, Mandolin, Acoustic guitar, Electric guitar
- Julian Butt: Accordion
- Fi Fraser: Violin

Previous:

- Wolodymyr "Wolly" Dyszkant: Vocals, Mandolin, Acoustic guitar (now living in Australia)
- Micky Nesteruk: Accordion, Backing Vocals
- David Petty: Bass Guitar (Crown of Thorns)
- Steve Cosgrove: Drums and Percussion (Frontline)
- Chris Lilley: Drums (Crown of Thorns)
- Ray Buckley: Electric Guitar, Bass, Vocals (Big Bad World)
- Ken 'Kenny' Lavish: Accordion, Bass (Big Bad World)
- John Leonard: Accordion, Guitar
- Wayne Banks, now with Blaze
- Rick Millband: Drums; (now living in Australia)
- Marcus Carter: Drums

== Discography ==
Sing To The End Of The World (2024)
CD/Digital Album. Recorded, Mixed and Mastered by Robin Newman and Richard Collins at Snug Recording Co.

1. I'll Go Alone.
2. This Is The Story.
3. Crime Of Rights.
4. All As One.
5. So Go Home.
6. Rewind.
7. How Do You Sleep (Ft. Flo Parker).
8. A Long Time Ago.
9. Are You Happy Now.
10. Social Divide.
11. Think It Over.
12. Sing To The End Of The World.

See you next Tuesday (2022)
CD Album.
Recorded and produced during the covid-19 pandemic by The Newcranes

1. Theme
2. Turpentine
3. Box of Shadows
4. Too Good With A Gun
5. Don't Drag My Body Down
6. Man's Inhumanity
7. Natures Love
8. Frontline
9. Crown Of Thorns

Frontline (1992).
CD Mini Album.
12" Mini Album. Musidisc 109841/MU210.
Produced by Philip Tennant.
Prelude to Frontline based on Zapowit (The Final Testament) by Taras Shevchenko.

1. Frontline.
2. Box of Shadows.
3. Nature’s Love.
4. Theme.
5. Turpentine.
6. Man’s Inhumanity.

Don’t Drag my Body Down. (1993).
12" Single. Vinyl Urinyl 12UV001.
CD Single. Vinyl Urinyl CU001.
Produced by Philip Tennant.

1. Don’t Drag My Body Down.
2. West of the City.
3. Too Good with a Gun.

Crown of Thorns (1994).
Produced by Pat Collier.
12" Single. Red Records. RED121.

1. Crown of Thorns.
2. Back in the Old Country.
3. You Can’t Have it All.

Big Bad World (1991).
Produced by The Newcranes with Pete Stewart.
12" Single. Vinyl Urinal. VU9155.

1. Big Bad World.
2. Natures Love.
3. West Of The City.

Various Artists: Boo! Ere Cop a Load of This (1992).
Compilation Album Musidisc CD 110062.

- Turpentine & Natures Love.

Also Wolly's Travelling in Sound (1989).
12" Album. Reel Run Records. SRT 9KL 2334.
Produced by Joe King.

1. Brighter Weather (3:05).
2. Sounds of Change (4:30).
3. I See You (3:00).
4. Josephina (3:25).
5. Can Someone Explain (5:30).
6. Mandonleen (3.05) Traditional Ukrainian.
7. At The End of the Day (2:50).
8. To Be With You Once Again (4:45).
9. Time To Go (4:20).
10. The Ride, The Trap (5:15).
