= Celtas Cortos =

Spanish Celtic rock band

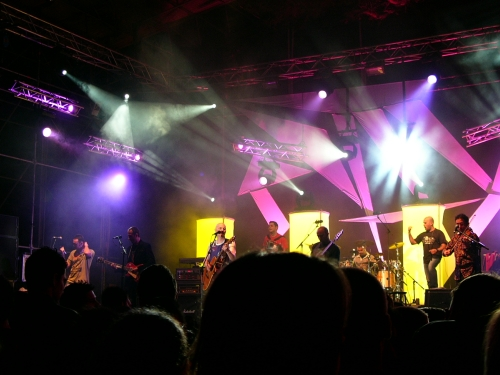

Background information
- Origin: Valladolid, Spain
- Genres: Celtic rock, folk rock
- Years active: 1986–present
- Members: Jesús H. Cifuentes; Goyo Yeves; Alberto García; Antón Dávila; José Sendino; Diego Martín; Chuchi Marcos
- Past members: Carlos Soto; César Cuenca; Luis M. de Tejada; Óscar García; Nacho Castro; Jesús González; Antuán Muñoz
- Website: https://celtascortos.com/

Celtas Cortos is a Spanish Celtic rock band. They have sold over two million records during their career, making them one of the most commercially successful Spanish groups of all time.

They formed in Valladolid (Castilla y León) in 1986. Eight friends, four of whom played in the group Almenara, decided to participate in a music contest under the name "Colectivo Eurofolk". They won the first prize and continued to play together, changing their name to Celtas Cortos. Nacho Castro, the former drummer, suggested the name based on his favourite tobacco.

They won another contest in April 1987, where the prize was the production of an album. They shared the prize with two other winners, and contributed three songs to the album Así es como suena: Folk joven.

Executive producer Paco Martín helped them get out their first album, Salida de emergencia, with only instrumental songs. The next album, Gente Impresentable added the voice and the lyrics of Jesús H. Cifuentes (Cifu) to the powerful instruments. Their Celtic rock style was combined with protest and other more melancholic lyrics. Through the years their music mixed with different styles such as Caribbean music, flamenco, electronic music or reggae. Their list of hits include 20 de Abril, La senda del tiempo and Tranquilo Majete.

In 2002, Cifu left the group, a definitive turning point after the departure of César Cuenca and Nacho Martín. At the beginning of 2006, Cifu came back to the group to prepare their next release, 20 years after their foundation. Their 2008 album 40 de Abril was very popular, landing in the top five of the Spanish albums chart. Between 2008 and 2016 they released another four albums.

== Discography ==
- 1988 - Así es como suena: folk joven (Demo)
- 1989 - Salida de emergencia
- 1990 - Gente impresentable
- 1991 - Cuéntame un cuento
- 1993 - Tranquilo majete
- 1995 - ¡Vamos!
- 1996 - En estos días inciertos
- 1997 - Nos vemos en los bares
- 1998 - El alquimista loco
- 1999 - The best of (Compilation)
- 1999 - Tienes la puerta abierta
- 2001 - Grandes éxitos, pequeños regalos (Compilation)
- 2002 - Gente distanta (Compilation)
- 2003 - C'est la vie
- 2004 - Celtificado (Bootleg)
- 2006 - 20 soplando versos (Compilation)
- 2008 - 40 de Abril
- 2010 - Introversiones
- 2012 - Vivos y Directors
- 2014 - Contratiempos
- 2016 - In Crescendo
- 2018 - Energía positiva
