= Sir Reg =

SIR REG
- Also known as: SIR REG
- Origin: Köping, Sweden; Dublin, Ireland
- Genres: Celtic punk, folk punk, punk rock
- Years active: 2009–present
- Label: Despotz Records
- Members: Brendan Sheehy; Karin Ullvin; Chris Inoue; Johan Sand; Anders Sevebo; Filip Burgman; Johan Månsson
- Website: SIR REG

SIR REG is a Swedish seven-piece band formed in Köping, Sweden 2009 which plays Celtic punk rock, led by Irish vocalist Brendan Sheehy. They are signed to Despotz Records.

== History ==
Sir Reg was founded in 2009 of members from the band The Barcrawlers and consists of Irish singer Brendan Sheehy and six Swedish musicians, Karin Ullvin, Chris Inoue, Johan Sand, Johan Månsson, Filip Burgman and Anders Sevebo who all come from different musical backgrounds; classical, jazz, rock and punk. They have released five albums, all of which have received positive reviews.

== Career ==
Sir Reg tours constantly and has played in many places throughout Europe. In 2010 they joined Misfits (band) for a three-week tour of Europe.

They've also shared the stage with Danko Jones, Thin Lizzy, Fiddler's Green, The Real McKenzies, Talco, H.E.A.T., The Exploited, The Mahones, KSMB and The Meteors.

Their eponymous début album was voted "Best Celtic rock and punk albums of 2010" by the readers of the Celticfolkpunk and also by listeners on internet radio station Paddy Rock Radio.

Celticfolkpunk has also voted Sir Reg "Best Celtic band of 2010". Their second album "A Sign Of The Times" received great reviews around the world and made it possible for Sir Reg to receive the award for "Best Celtic Rock & Punk Album of 2011" by Paddy Rock Radio, for the second year they have been nominated . Even when the charts from the four main pages of this genre were compared, "A Sign Of The Times" was the most popular album among both fans and critics.

The first two singles from their latest album "21st Century Loser", "'Til The Dead Come Alive" and "Emigrate" are played frequently on radio stations worldwide. On Sweden's biggest rock radio station, Sir Reg - Emigrate ended up on their "Most Wanted" list (five most played songs) many times, including first place twice so far and have now become one of the bands which are played daily.

Paddy Rock Radio and their listeners voted their album "21st Century Loser" into first place out of 25 bands/albums from all over the world, in the category "Best Of Celtic Rock & Punk 2013".

In late 2013, SIR REG got two "Bandit Rock Awards" nominations:

- Swedish Breakthrough of the Year
- Best Swedish Album

In late August 2014 SIR REG signed with GAIN Music.

In 2018 they signed with Swedish label Despotz Records.

== Musical style ==
Their music can be described as Celtic punk/rock with strong melodies and meaningful lyrics. Many of the songs are about Ireland, its politicians and the Irish boom, called The Celtic Tiger. The band is often compared musically with punk heroes Flogging Molly and Dropkick Murphys.

== Members ==
- Brendan Sheehy - lead vocals, acoustic guitar
- Karin Ullvin – fiddle
- Chris Inoue – electric guitar
- Johan Sand – electric guitar
- Johan Månsson – drums
- Filip Burgman – mandolin
- Anders Sevebo - bass

== Discography ==
=== Album releases ===
- 2010 - SIR REG
- 2011 - A Sign Of The Times
- 2013 - 21st Century Loser
- 2016 - Modern Day Disgrace
- 2018 - The Underdogs
- 2022 - Kings Of Sweet Feck All

=== Single releases ===
- 2011 - Far Away
- 2011 - Dublin City
- 2011 - A Sign Of The Times
- 2012 - How The Hell Can You Sleep?
- 2013 - 'Til the Dead Come Alive
- 2013 - Emigrate
- 2018 - “FOOL (Fight of our Lives)”
- 2018 - “Sinner of the Century”
- 2018 - “The Underdogs”
