= Paddy and the Rats =

Hungarian celtic punk band

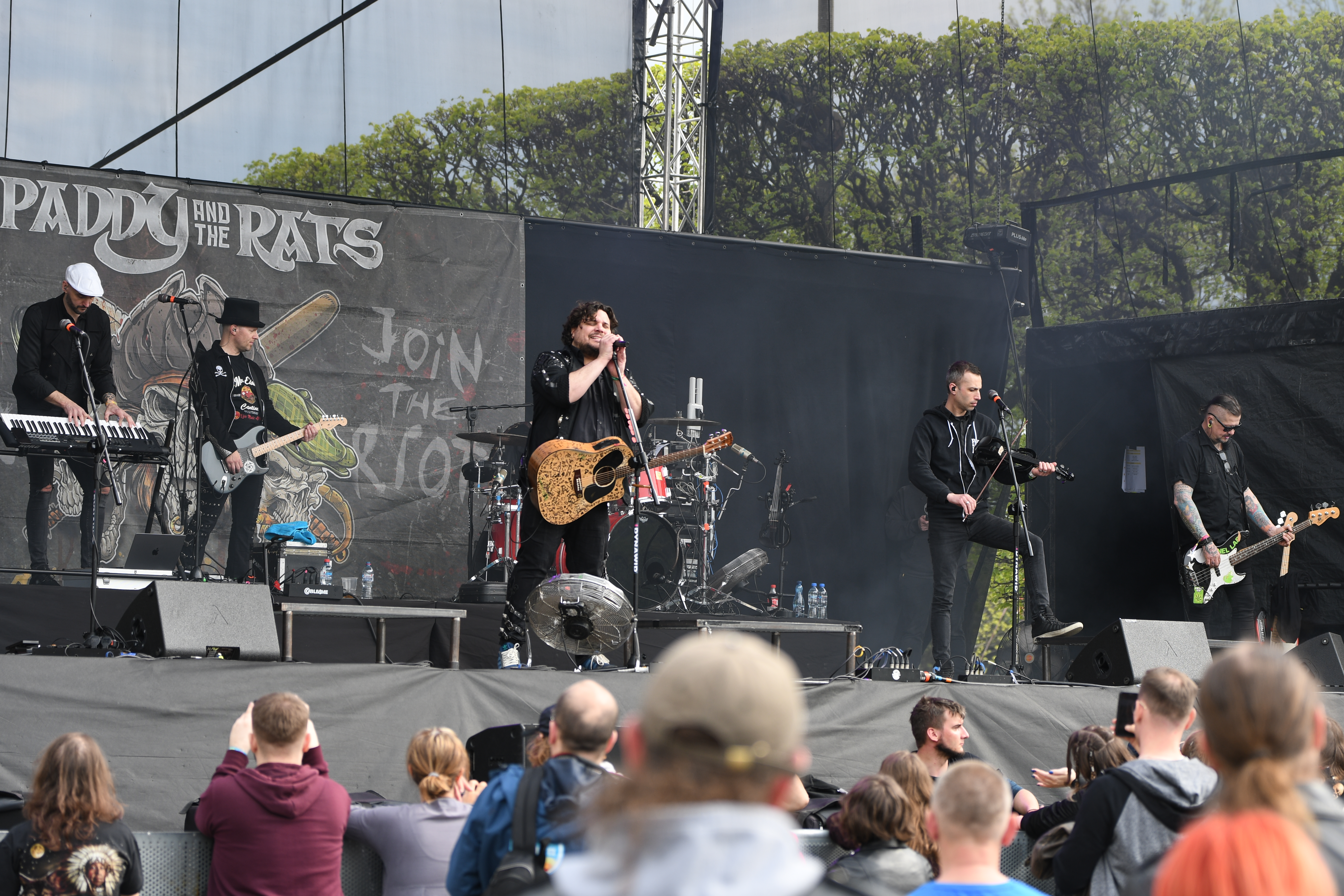
- Paddy and the Rats - Live concert in 2023

Background information
- Origin: Miskolc, Hungary
- Genres: Celtic Punk, folk punk, punk rock
- Years active: 2008–present
- Labels: Napalm Records
- Members: Paddy O'Reilly (Kristóf Oravecz); Sam McKenzie (Sándor Szabó); Joey MacOnkay (Géza Maczonkai); Vince Murphy (Péter Takács); Seamus Connelly (Balázs Pongrácz)
- Past members: Sonny Sullivan; Bernie Bellamy (Bernát Babicsek)
- Website: www.paddyandtherats.hu

Paddy and the Rats is a Celtic punk band from Miskolc, Hungary. The group was founded by Paddy O'Reilly (songwriter, vocals), Vince Murphy (bass) and Joey MacOnkay (electric guitar) in 2008. Seamus Connelly (drums), Sonny Sullivan (accordion) and Sam McKenzie (fiddle, Irish whistles, bagpipes, mandolin) later joined the group. The music is Irish and Celtic folk but they combine punk rock, sea shanties, and some Russian, Romani and polka elements.

In 2008, they released their first album Itz Only Pub 'n Roll, But I Like It.

In 2009, the band's second album Rats on Board was released. It was a big hit even outside Hungary, even winning second place in the album of the year poll from Celtic-rock portal. That same year, they were the most downloaded Hungarian band on iTunes.

In 2011, the third album from Paddy and the Rats was released titled, Hymns For Bastards, which was a more upbeat album.

In 2012, their fourth album, Tales From The Docks was released. In 2012, Sonny Sullivan left the band while Bernie Bellamy took his place.

On September 7, 2015, the fifth album, Lonely Hearts' Boulevard was released. Paddy stated that this album was more experimental and darker than their previous album and wanted a title that showed that. The title was also influenced by Green Day's "Boulevard of Broken Dreams".

On June 7, 2017, they released the sixth album Riot City Outlaws. They worked with the famous producer, Cameron Webb.

On January 12, 2018, they signed with Napalm Records.

On January 1, 2022, they announced the death of accordionist Bernie Bellamy (Bernát Babicsek).

== Discography ==
=== Albums ===
- Itz Only Pub 'n Roll, But I Like It (2008)
- Rats on Board (2009)
- Hymns for Bastards (2011)
- Tales from the Docks (2012)
- Lonely Hearts' Boulevard (2015)
- Riot City Outlaws (2017)
- From Wasteland to Wonderland (2022)
- Lord of The Drinks (2024)
