= Mark McCafferty =

Mark McCafferty was the chief executive officer of Premiership Rugby, the entity that organises the English Premiership rugby union competition. McCafferty served as the Premier Rugby Association's chief executive since taking over from Howard Thomas in 2005. Under McCafferty's tenure, the Premiership obtained a sponsorship contract with Guinness. The Premiership then obtained a multi-year sponsorship from Aviva in 2010 for US $7.5 million annually; Aviva later signed a sponsorship renewal through 2017. McCafferty has also helped the Premiership improved its Sky TV contract, before signing in 2012 a four-year contract with BT worth 38 million British pounds annually.

Rugby World ranked McCafferty as the most influential person in world rugby in 2014, due in large part to McCafferty's leadership in moving international European rugby competition to a new system where Premiership rugby has an increased role in governance, a larger share of revenues, and a revamped competitive format.

McCafferty held several positions in the business world before taking up his role in Premiership Rugby — with Midland Bank, with the Thomas Cook group, and then with Avis.
