= MagellanMusic =

American musical group

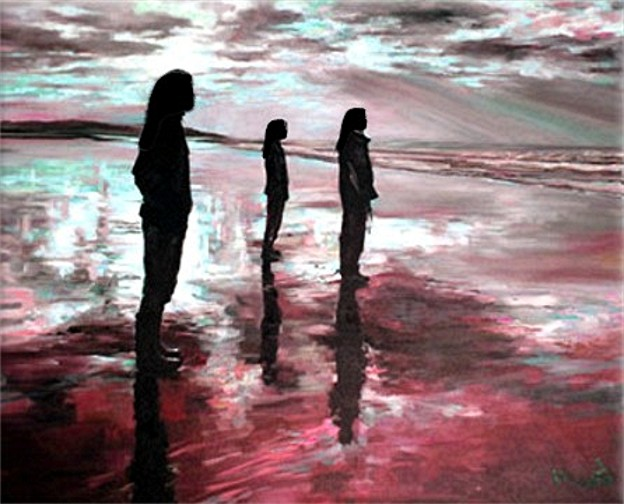

Background information
- Origin: Minneapolis, Minnesota, United States
- Genres: Rock, pop rock, progressive rock, indie rock, folk, blues, electronic
- Years active: 1975–present
- Members: Jeff Youngblood; Ike Erwin; Fred Wheeler; Jerry Handegan; Liij Korg
- Website: www.magellanmusic.com

MagellanMusic, formerly "Magellan", is an independent musical group that formed in 1975. They have produced 25 studio albums since that year with the last seven in digital format. They were initially considered part of the progressive rock era but were known for playing acoustic instruments, which was something of an oddity at that time. Soon after they branched out into pop, rock, blues, folk, electronic, and spoken word comedy. They named the group in admiration of the Portuguese explorer, Ferdinand Magellan.

== Background ==
MagellanMusic is primarily known in progressive rock and alternative rock circles.

In MagellanMusic's early years they were innovative by selling their recordings at live performances, as well as publishing newsletters, which is standard practice for independent artists today. They also used humorous pseudonyms and homonyms instead of their real names to satirize that common habit in entertainment.

The band split up in 1984 but reunited in 1988 with an album called R, which was influenced by the Beatles' White Album. At that point they were strictly a studio band collaborating with other musicians in different cities, but soon returned to occasional live performances.

MagellanMusic was also among the first to use MP3 on the internet before it became a standard digital program, their first CD, A Strange Traffic of Dreams, appearing in 1997. That was followed with Ghost of a Living Twilight in 2001, MagellanMusic Presents - Phanus Phallus Phobias Greatest Sh!ts! in 2004, Yesterday's Children in 2005, which was later discontinued for Yesterday's Children (V.2) released in 2009, Whispers in 2011, and Impressions in 2021.

The band originated in Paducah, Kentucky, but today MagellanMusic remains an active studio group based in Minneapolis and Oklahoma City.

Their name, MagellanMusic, was trademarked in 2013.

== Members ==
- Jeff Youngblood a.k.a. Per Jensen – vocals, guitar, keyboards
- Ike Erwin a.k.a. Derek Story – vocals, guitar
- Fred Wheeler a.k.a. Cy Kadellick – keyboards, programming
- Jerry Handegan a.k.a. Syl O. Syben – vocals, bass guitar
- Liij Korg .a.k.a. Ellis Dee – drums, percussion

In addition to the main quintet, the band has performed with a number of artists called "Fellow Travelers."

== Discography ==
- The Voyage of Magellan (1975)
- The Soundtrack (1976)
- Beyond the Visible World (1976)
- Death of a Favorite Cat (1976)
- Made (1977)
- In The Night (1978)
- The Metronome Stops (1978)
- 969695 (1979)
- The Way of the Wind (1980)
- Troik Systems (1981)
- Songs for the Evening (1984)
- Magellan (1987)
- R (1988)
- Red Moon (1989)
- The 15th Anniversary Collection (1990)
- Not the Next Magellan Album (1991)
- Broadcast (1992)
- Who Watches the Watchers (1993)
- A Phanus XXX-mas (1994)
- A Strange Traffic of Dreams (1997)
- Ghost of a Living Twilight (2001)
- Phanus Phallus Phobias – Greatest Sh!ts! (2004)
- Yesterday’s Children (2005)
- Yesterday’s Children (V.2) (2009)
- Whispers (2011)
- Impressions (2021)
