= Phil Thomas Katt =

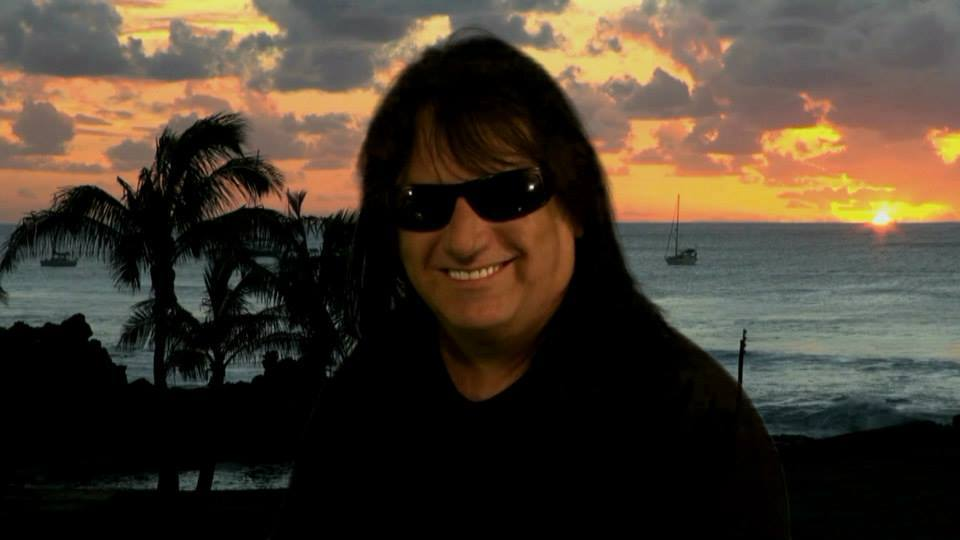

Background information
- Also known as: PTK
- Origin: Pensacola, Florida, United States
- Genres: Techno Crooner, Bubblegum, Rockabilly, New Wave, Soft Rock, Beach Rock, Outsider
- Occupations: Singer/Songwriter, Music Video Producer, Radio DJ
- Instruments: Vocals, synthesizer, guitar
- Website: www.philthomaskatt.com

Phil Thomas Katt, sometimes called PTK, is a singer/songwriter, filmmaker, music video producer, and radio DJ from Pensacola, Florida. He is the creator and host of The Uncharted Zone, a weekly, web-based program that showcases the music videos of both local musicians and artists across the globe. He also hosts PTK Late Nite on Radio Free Pensacola, an internet radio station.

Phil Thomas Katt is renowned for his use of self-describing adjectives, including "The Space-Happy," "The Flamboyant," and, perhaps his best known, "The Eccentric". He is recognized for his "smooth, Southern voice" and trademark black shag hairdo and sunglasses.

== Early life ==
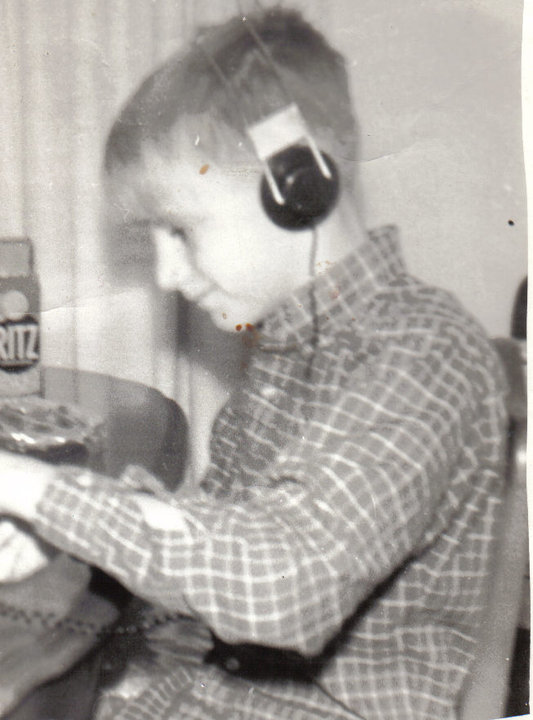
Phil Thomas Katt, 1970

In 1967, Phil Thomas Katt gave his first live performance before an audience of nine fellow neighborhood children. The set included his own rendition of the "Gilligan's Island" theme song. According to Katt, "The first time I performed, I sang the 'Gilligan's Island' song for the neighborhood kids. I knew right then that I wanted to be a musician."

Katt was briefly on the air in his childhood neighborhood, having built an AM Radio Transmitter from a schematic. The FCC eventually tracked down the station Katt called WPHL, shut it down, and fined his father.

== Early recording career ==
Katt was heavily influenced by the music of David Gates and Bread. This influence eventually inspired him to begin writing his own songs. One of his first compositions was penning lyrics to an instrumental on an album he owned. He later learned guitar to accompany his singing, and, in 1974, formed an acoustic duo, called SUNRISE, with singer/songwriter, Roger Beasley, performing at private parties.

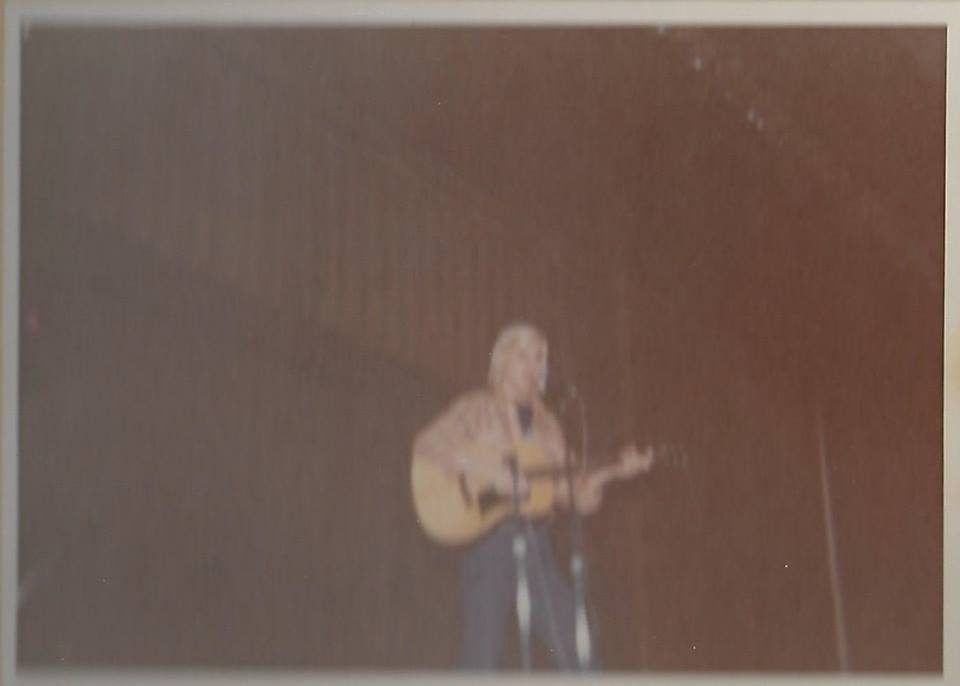
Phil Thomas Katt performing live in the Late 70s

By 1977, Katt had recorded his first record, titled "Brand New Love." He recorded it under the name "Phil" at Prestige Productions Records in Birmingham, Alabama. Katt hand-delivered copies of the 45 rpm record to radio stations across the southeastern United States and received airplay on a number of them.

That same year, Katt also made his first television appearance on The Country Boy Eddie Show, a local morning music, variety and talk show also based in Birmingham. He was also the warm-up act for Tony McGil, an Elvis impersonator, touring the Southeast and performing at Saenger Theaters and various Municipal Auditoriums.

In 1978, Katt signed a contract with King Records. His second single, "Rockin' In My Chevy," was recorded in Nashville, Tennessee and was released nationwide. To support the single's release, Katt toured a string of roller skating rinks, where he signed his first autographs.

== Radio career ==
In 1978, Katt got his first radio job at WFTW, a station based out of Fort Walton Beach, Florida. While there, Katt gained a following for his trivia show, "Journey Through the Night." By 1981, Katt was working at WNVY in Pensacola, where he developed a fan club intermixing his music and radio careers. Katt later joined WXBM, a country music station also based out of Pensacola, in 1985. However, in 1986, WXBM fired him. According to Katt, the station management felt he was "too Rock 'N' Roll." Katt eventually rejoined WXBM in 1988, once new management came in.

In 1990, Katt joined Mobile's ROCK 104. His overnight show went to #1. It was during this time that Katt met Tommy Robinetti, with whom he has since worked with both on The Uncharted Zone and Radio Free Pensacola.

During a period of several months in 1991, Katt was on the air at five separate radio stations, including WXBM, WCOA, and Q100, ROCK 104 and KISS-FM. His overnight request show at WXBM, Radio Jukebox, became the "highest rated overnight show in the history of Gulf Coast FM Radio."
