= Lehto and Wright =

Lehto and Wright are a Celtic/American/English folk and progressive rock band from Minneapolis, USA. Steve Lehto and John Wright perform either as a duo or, with the addition of Matt Jacobs on drums and percussion, a Celtic rock trio. They have been positively reviewed by such notable magazines and webzines as Dirty Linen, fRoots (folk roots), Allmusic and Sing Out!.

== Current band members ==
- John Wright: acoustic guitar, bass guitar, bass pedals and vocals
- Steve Lehto: acoustic and electric guitars, mandolin and vocals
- Matt Jacobs: drums and assorted percussion

== Discography ==
=== Lehto & Wright ===
- 2019- Curios
- 2012- November (New Folk Records)
- 2010 - Children's Songs (New Folk Records)
- 2007 - Between the Jigs and the Reels (New Folk Records)
- 2006 - Live at the Focal Point (New Folk Records)
- 2005 - The Thrashing Machine and Other Stories (New Folk Records)
- 2004 - A Game of Chess (New Folk Records)
- 2002 - The Further Adventures of Darling Cory (New Folk Records)
- 2001 - Ye Mariners All (featuring Matt Jacobs) (New Folk Records)

=== John Wright solo releases ===
- 2000 - Just Left of Center
- 1998 - At Cross Purposes

=== John Wright appearances with others ===
- 2006 - I Love Your Soup - Paul Mayasich
- 2005 - It Plays Me - Greg Herriges (New Folk Records)
- 2005 - Times is Hard - Paul Mayasich with Benderheads
- 2005 - Coming Home - Darren Crossey
- 2003 - Where You Been? - Paul Mayasich
- 2002 - Hard Times - Karie Oberg (New Folk Records)
