= Folk rock =

Fusion genre of rock and folk music

- Stylistic origins: Folk; rock
- Cultural origins: Early to mid-1960s, United States
- Derivative forms: Acid rock; roots rock; heartland rock; neofolk; sunshine pop

Subgenres
- British folk rock; Celtic rock; folk punk; indie folk; medieval folk rock

Other topics
- Folk metal; blues rock; garage rock; singer-songwriters; jangle; list of artists; progressive country; progressive folk; progressive rock; psychedelic folk; raga rock; rockabilly; soft rock

Folk rock is a fusion genre of rock music with heavy influences from English and American folk music. It arose in the United States, Canada, and the United Kingdom in the mid-1960s. In the U.S., folk rock emerged from the folk music revival. Performers such as Bob Dylan and the Byrds—several of whose members had earlier played in folk ensembles—attempted to blend the sounds of rock with their pre-existing folk repertoire, adopting the use of electric instrumentation and drums in a way previously discouraged in the U.S. folk community. The term "folk rock" was initially used in the U.S. music press in June 1965 to describe the Byrds' music.

Although British rock band the Animals had released an electric version of "The House of the Rising Sun" in the U.S. in August 1964 —which reached number one on the Billboard Hot 100 singles chart and stayed there for three weeks, selling over a million copies in just five weeks in the U.S., and inspiring Dylan to record with an electric band—it was ultimately the commercial success of the Byrds' cover version of Dylan's "Mr. Tambourine Man" and their debut album of the same name, along with Dylan's own recordings with rock instrumentation—on the albums Bringing It All Back Home (1965), Highway 61 Revisited (1965), and Blonde on Blonde (1966)—that encouraged other folk acts, such as Simon & Garfunkel, to use electric backing on their records, and led to the formation of groups such as Buffalo Springfield. Dylan's controversial appearance at the Newport Folk Festival on 25 July 1965, where he was backed by an electric band, was also a pivotal moment in the development of the genre.

During the late 1960s in Britain and Europe, a distinct, eclectic British folk rock style was created by Pentangle, Fairport Convention and Alan Stivell. Inspired by British psychedelic folk and the North American style of folk rock, British folk rock bands began to incorporate elements of traditional British folk music into their repertoire, leading to other variants, including the overtly English folk rock of the Albion Band and Celtic rock.

== Definition and etymology ==
"Folk rock" refers to the blending of elements of folk and rock music, which arose in the U.S. and UK in the mid-1960s. The genre was pioneered by the Byrds, who began playing traditional folk music and songs by Bob Dylan with rock instrumentation, in a style heavily influenced by the Beatles and other British Invasion bands. Dylan also contributed to the creation of the genre, with his recordings utilizing rock instrumentation on the albums Bringing It All Back Home, Highway 61 Revisited, and Blonde on Blonde.

With Bob Dylan as the stimulus and the Byrds as disciples, a wave of folk-rock is developing in contemporary pop music.

— Eliot Tiegel, Billboard, June 1965

The term folk rock was coined by the journalist Eliot Tiegel, who used it in Billboard magazine on June 12, 1965. In his article, "Folkswinging Wave On – Courtesy of Rock Groups", Tiegel used the term principally to describe the music of the Byrds, who issued their debut album in the U.S. later that month. In the same article, he wrote that Billy J. Kramer, Jackie DeShannon and Sonny & Cher had all started incorporating "folk-oriented material on singles", and he listed Rising Sons, Joe and Eddie and the Lovin' Spoonful as new folk-rock acts.

== Antecedents ==
=== Folk revival ===
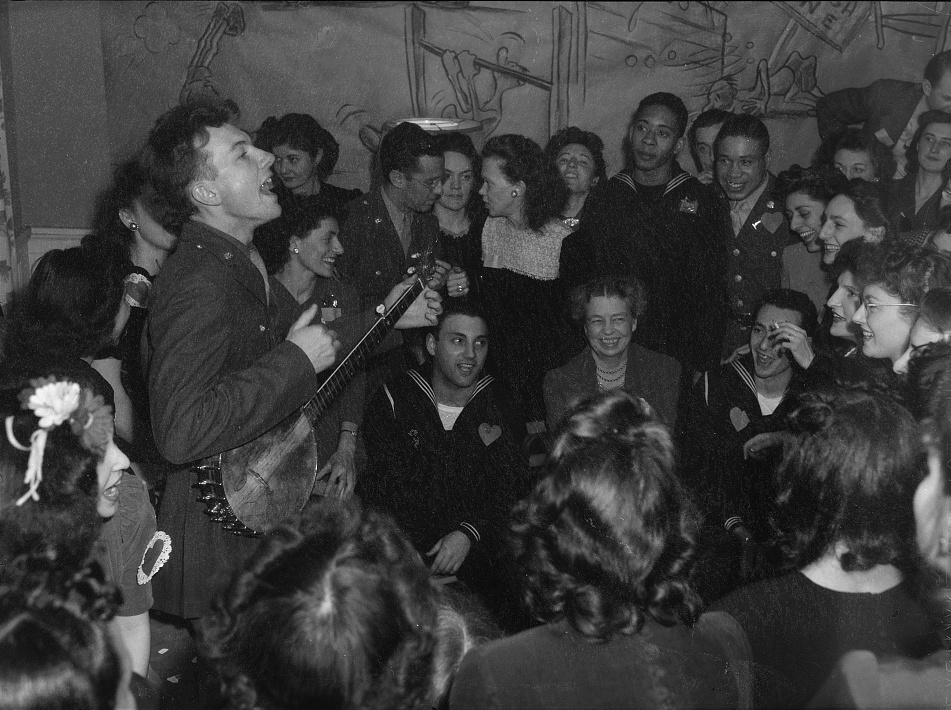
Pete Seeger entertaining Eleanor Roosevelt (center), at a racially integrated Valentine's Day party, 1944

The American folk-music revival began during the 1940s; building on the interest in protest folk singers such as Woody Guthrie and Pete Seeger, it reached a peak in popularity in the mid-1960s with artists such as Bob Dylan and Joan Baez. In 1948, Seeger formed the Weavers, whose mainstream popularity set the stage for the folk revival of the 1950s and early 1960s and also served to bridge the gap between folk, popular music, and topical song. The Weavers' sound and repertoire of traditional folk material and topical songs directly inspired the Kingston Trio, a folk group who came to prominence in 1958 with their hit recording of "Tom Dooley". The Kingston Trio provided the template for a flood of "collegiate folk" groups between 1958 and 1962.

Tom Dooley
An excerpt from the Kingston Trio's hit recording of the traditional folk song "Tom Dooley". The song reached #1 on the Billboard Hot 100 chart in 1958 and provided a template for the nascent "collegiate folk" movement, which itself was one of the foundation stones of the mid-1960s folk rock boom.

At roughly the same time as these "collegiate folk" vocal groups came to national prominence, a second group of urban folk revivalists, influenced by the music and guitar picking styles of folk and blues artist such as Woody Guthrie, Lead Belly, Brownie McGhee, and Josh White, also came to the fore. Many of these urban revivalists were influenced by recordings of traditional American music from the 1920s and 1930s, which had been reissued by Folkways Records; Harry Smith's Anthology of American Folk Music was particularly influential. While this urban folk revival flourished in many cities, New York City, with its burgeoning Greenwich Village coffeehouse scene and population of topical folk singers, was widely regarded as the centre of the movement. Out of this fertile environment came such folk-protest luminaries as Bob Dylan, Tom Paxton, Phil Ochs, and Peter, Paul and Mary, many of whom would transition into folk rock performers as the 1960s progressed.

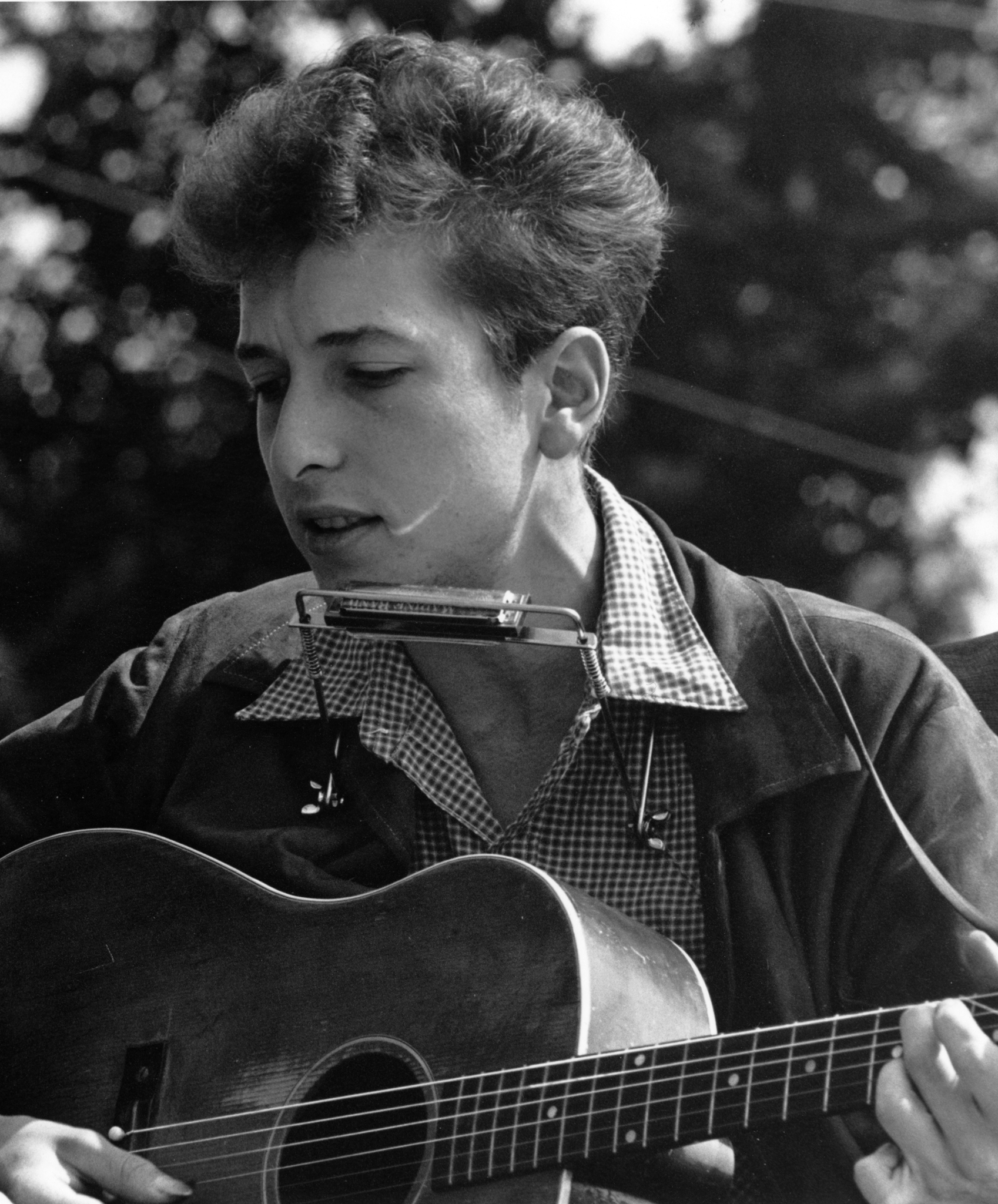
Bob Dylan was the most influential of all the urban folk-protest songwriters.

The vast majority of the urban folk revivalists shared a disdain for the values of mainstream American mass culture and led many folk singers to begin composing their own "protest" material. The influence of this folk-protest movement would later manifest itself in the sociopolitical lyrics and mildly anti-establishment sentiments of many folk rock songs, including hit singles such as "Eve of Destruction", "Like a Rolling Stone", "For What It's Worth", and "Let's Live for Today".

During the 1950s and early 1960s in the UK, a parallel folk revival referred to as the second British folk revival, was led by folk singers Ewan MacColl and Bert Lloyd. Both viewed British folk music as a vehicle for leftist political concepts and an antidote to the American-dominated popular music of the time. However, it was not until 1956 and the advent of the skiffle craze that the British folk revival crossed over into the mainstream and connected with British youth culture. Skiffle renewed popularity of folk music forms in Britain and led directly to the progressive folk movement and the attendant British folk club scene. Among the leading lights of the progressive folk movement were Bert Jansch and John Renbourn, who would later form the folk rock band Pentangle in the late 1960s. Other notable folk rock artists with roots in the progressive folk scene were Donovan, Al Stewart, John Martyn and Paul Simon.

=== The Beatles and the British Invasion ===
They were doing things nobody was doing. Their chords were outrageous, just outrageous, and their harmonies made it all valid. You could only do that with other musicians. Even if you're playing your own chords you had to have other people playing with you. That was obvious. And it started me thinking about other people.

— Bob Dylan reflecting on how the Beatles influenced his decision to record with an electric backing band

Beginning in 1964 and lasting until roughly 1966, a wave of British beat groups, including the Beatles, the Rolling Stones, the Dave Clark Five, Gerry & the Pacemakers, the Kinks, and Herman's Hermits amongst others, dominated the U.S. music charts. These groups were all heavily influenced by American rock 'n' roll, blues, and R&B—musical genres they had been introduced to via homegrown British rock 'n' roll singers, imported American records, and the music of the skiffle craze. These UK groups, known collectively as the British Invasion, reintroduced American youth culture to the broad potential of rock and pop music as a creative medium and to the wealth of musical culture to be found within the United States.

Of particular importance to the development of folk rock by the British Invasion were the subtle folk influences evident in such Beatles' compositions as "I'll Be Back", "Things We Said Today", and "I'm a Loser", with the latter song being directly inspired by folk singer-songwriter Bob Dylan. In the opinion of Roger McGuinn of the Byrds, writers who attempt to define the origins of folk rock "don't realise that the Beatles were responsible as far back as 1963". He cites "She Loves You" as one of the first examples where the Beatles introduced folk chord changes into rock music and so initiated the new genre. These songs were all influential in providing a template for successfully assimilating folk-based chord progressions and melodies into pop music. This melding of folk and rock 'n' roll in the Beatles' music became even more explicit during 1965, with the release of "You've Got to Hide Your Love Away", a folk-derived song with introspective lyrics, again influenced by Dylan. Although the Beatles themselves utilized folk as just one of many styles evident in their music, the underlying folk influences in a number of their songs would prove to be important to folk rock musicians attempting to blend their own folk influences with beat music.

I'm a Loser
The subtle folk influences evident in such Beatles' songs as "I'm a Loser" were important in demonstrating how folk-based chord progressions and melodies could be to assimilated into pop music.

You've Got to Hide Your Love Away
The use of folk influences in the Beatles' music became even more explicit during 1965, with the release of "You've Got to Hide Your Love Away".

The effect that the music of these British bands, and the Beatles in particular, had on young Americans was immediate; almost overnight, folk—along with many other forms of homegrown music—became passé for a large proportion of America's youth, who instead turned their attention to the influx of British acts. The influence of these acts also impacted on the collegiate folk and urban folk communities, with many young musicians quickly losing interest in folk music and instead embracing the rock 'n' roll derived repertoire of the British Invasion. Future members of many folk rock acts, including the Byrds, Jefferson Airplane, the Lovin' Spoonful, the Mamas & the Papas, and Buffalo Springfield, all turned their backs on traditional folk music during 1964 and 1965 as a direct result of the influence of the Beatles and the other British Invasion bands. Author and music historian Richie Unterberger has noted that the Beatles' impact on American popular culture effectively sounded the death knell for the American folk music revival.

In addition to The Beatles, the two British groups that were arguably the most influential on the development of folk rock were the Animals and the Searchers. The Animals released a rock interpretation of the traditional folk song "The House of the Rising Sun" in the U.S. in August 1964. The song reached number 1 on the Billboard Hot 100 singles chart and stayed there for three weeks, selling over a million copies in just five weeks in the U.S. The band's arrangement of "The House of the Rising Sun", which transmuted the song from an acoustic folk lament to a full-bore electric rock song, would go on to influence many folk rock acts but none more so than Dylan himself, who cited it as a key factor in his decision to record and perform with an electric rock band in 1965.

==== Electric Twelve-String Guitar in Folk Music ====
The Searchers were influential in popularizing the jangly sound of the electric twelve-string guitar. Many musicians in the collegiate and urban folk movements were already familiar with acoustic twelve-string guitars via the music of folk and blues singer Lead Belly. However, the Searchers' use of amplified twelve-strings provided another example of how conventional folk elements could be incorporated into rock music to produce new and exciting sounds. The Beatles' lead guitarist, George Harrison, also influenced this trend towards jangly guitars in folk rock with his use of a Rickenbacker twelve-string guitar on the Beatles' mid-1960s recordings. This relatively clean, jangly sound—without distortion or other guitar effects—became a cornerstone of folk rock instrumentation and was used in many American folk rock records made during 1965 and 1966.

=== Other precursors ===
We were a group, but not professional musicians. I had to de-complicate my music and get it simpler and simpler, so that we could play it and make it sound like a popular thing. Whenever you have a format like that, it sounds folky, because it's not glitzed over with anything. We only had acoustic and electric guitars, so every chance we got, we'd try to add some variety. The only way you could get variety was to go to a harmonica during this song, or get an acoustic in this space; get different moods that way.

— Ron Elliott of The Beau Brummels on the origins of the band's folk-flavored sound

Although folk rock mainly grew out of a mix of American folk revival and British Invasion influences, there were also a few examples of proto-folk rock that were important in the development of the genre. Of these secondary influences, Unterberger has cited the self-penned, folk-influenced material of San Francisco's the Beau Brummels as arguably the most important. Despite their Beatlesque image, the band's use of minor chords, haunting harmonies, and folky acoustic guitar playing—as heard on their debut single "Laugh, Laugh"—was stylistically very similar to the later folk rock of the Byrds. (Note: Neither the band nor their guitarist and chief songwriter Ron Elliott were overtly influenced by folk music. Elliot's own musical leanings were more towards country and western and musical theatre, with any folk influence in the band's music appearing to have been entirely unintentional.) Released in December 1964, "Laugh, Laugh" peaked at number 15 on the Billboard Hot 100 in early 1965, while its similarly folk-flavored follow-up, "Just a Little", did even better, reaching number 8 on the U.S. singles chart. The high-profile success of the Beau Brummels' music was important in demonstrating that a hybrid of folk and rock could potentially be translated into mainstream commercial success.

Pre-dating the Beau Brummels' commercial breakthrough by almost two years, singer-songwriter Jackie DeShannon's April 1963 single "Needles and Pins" marked, according to Unterberger, the earliest appearance of the ringing guitar sound that would become a mainstay of early folk rock. This use of cyclical, chiming guitar riffs was repeated on DeShannon's late 1963 recording of her own composition "When You Walk in the Room". The following year, both songs would become hits for the Liverpudlian band the Searchers, who chose to place even greater emphasis on the jangly guitar playing in the songs. In addition, a number of DeShannon's songs from the period, including "When You Walk in the Room", displayed a greater degree of lyrical maturity and sensuality than was usual for pop songs of the time. This heightened degree of emotional introspection was inspired by her love of Bob Dylan's folk songwriting and represents one of the first attempts by an American artist to absorb folk sensibilities into rock music.

In the UK, the folk group the Springfields (featuring Dusty Springfield) had been releasing folk-oriented material featuring full band arrangements since the early 1960s, including renditions of "Lonesome Traveler", "Allentown Jail", and "Silver Threads and Golden Needles". Although these records owed more to orchestral pop than rock, they were nonetheless influential on up-and-coming folk rock musicians on both sides of the Atlantic. In mid-1965, folk singer-songwriter Donovan was also experimenting with adding electrified instrumentation to some of his folk and blues-styled material, as evidenced by songs such as "You're Gonna Need Somebody on Your Bond" and "Sunny Goodge Street". In spite of his folky persona and repertoire, Donovan himself had always considered himself a pop star, rather than a folk singer. As a result, he had been thinking of a way in which to introduce folk styled acoustic guitars and socially conscious lyrics into pop music for several years prior to his 1965 breakthrough as a recording artist. By January 1966, he had recorded the self-penned hit "Sunshine Superman" with a full electric backing band.

Other bands and solo artists who were blurring the boundaries between folk and rock in the early 1960s include Judy Henske, Richard and Mimi Fariña, and the Mugwumps, the latter of which were a New York band featuring future members of the Lovin' Spoonful and the Mamas & the Papas. Also of note are the Australian band the Seekers, who had relocated to England in 1964 and reached number 1 on the UK Singles Chart with "I'll Never Find Another You" in February 1965. Unterberger has noted that, although it was not strictly a folk song, "I'll Never Find Another You" was heavily influenced by Peter, Paul and Mary and featured a cyclical, twelve-string guitar part that sounded similar to the guitar style that Jim McGuinn of the Byrds would popularize later that same year.

There are also a few antecedents to folk rock present in pre-British Invasion American rock 'n' roll, including Elvis Presley's 1954 cover of the Bill Monroe bluegrass standard "Blue Moon of Kentucky"; Buddy Holly's self-penned material, which strongly influenced both Dylan and the Byrds; Ritchie Valens' recording of the Mexican folk song "La Bamba"; Lloyd Price's rock 'n' roll adaptation of the African-American folk song "Stagger Lee" (originally recorded by Mississippi John Hurt in 1928); Jimmie Rodgers' rock 'n' roll flavored renditions of traditional folk songs; and the folk and country-influenced recordings featured on the Everly Brothers' 1959 album Songs Our Daddy Taught Us.

== 1960s ==
=== The Byrds ===
The moment when all of the separate influences that served to make up folk rock finally coalesced into an identifiable whole was with the release of the Byrds' recording of Bob Dylan's "Mr. Tambourine Man". The term "folk rock" was coined by the U.S. music press to describe the band's sound in June 1965, at roughly the same time as "Mr. Tambourine Man" peaked at number 1 on the Billboard chart. Within three months it had become the first folk rock smash hit, reaching number 1 on both the Billboard Hot 100 and the UK Singles Chart. The single's success initiated the folk rock boom of 1965 and 1966, during which a profusion of Byrds-influenced acts flooded the American and British charts. (Note: The nucleus of the Byrds formed in early 1964, when Jim McGuinn, Gene Clark, and David Crosby—united by a shared love of the Beatles' music—came together under the moniker of the Jet Set at The Troubadour folk club in Los Angeles. The trio all had a background in folk music, with each member having worked as a folk singer on the acoustic coffeehouse circuit during the early 1960s. They had also spent time, independently of each other, in various folk groups, including the New Christy Minstrels, the Limeliters, the Chad Mitchell Trio, and Les Baxter's Balladeers. Soon after forming the Jet Set, Crosby introduced McGuinn and Clark to his associate Jim Dickson, who became the group's manager. Dickson had access to World Pacific Studios in Los Angeles, which he began to utilize as a rehearsal space for the band. During the course of 1964, the trio expanded their ranks to include drummer Michael Clarke and bassist Chris Hillman, with the band eventually changing its name to the Byrds in November.) In particular, the Byrds' influence can be discerned in mid-1960s recordings by acts such as the Lovin' Spoonful, Barry McGuire, the Mamas & the Papas, Simon & Garfunkel, Jefferson Airplane, the Turtles, We Five, Love, and Sonny & Cher.

It was during the rehearsals at World Pacific that the band began to develop the blend of folk music and Beatles-style pop that would characterize their sound. However, this hybrid was not deliberately created; it evolved organically out of some of the band members' own folk music roots and their desire to emulate the Beatles. The band's folk influences, lack of experience with rock music forms, and Beatleseque instrumentation all combined to color both their self-penned material and their folk derived repertoire. The band themselves soon realized that there was something unique about their music and, with Dickson's encouragement, they began to actively attempt to bridge the gap between folk and rock.

Mr. Tambourine Man's blend of abstract lyrics, folk-influenced melody, complex harmonies, jangly 12-string Rickenbacker guitar playing, and Beatles-influenced beat, resulted in a synthesis that effectively created the subgenre of folk rock. The song's lyrics alone took rock and pop songwriting to new heights; never before had such intellectual and literary lyrics been combined with rock instrumentation by a popular music group.

Dylan's material would provide much of the original grist for the folk rock mill, not only in the U.S. but in the UK as well, with many pop and rock acts covering his material in a style reminiscent of the Byrds. Their reworking of "Mr. Tambourine Man", along with the Animals' rock interpretation of "The House of the Rising Sun" (itself based on Dylan's earlier cover), helped to give Dylan the impetus to start recording with an electric backing band.

As the 1970s dawned, folk rock evolved away from the jangly template pioneered by the Byrds, but their influence could still be heard in the music of bands like Fairport Convention and Pentangle. The Byrds themselves continued to enjoy commercial success with their brand of folk rock throughout 1965, most notably with their number 1 single "Turn! Turn! Turn!". By the start of 1966, however, the group had begun to move away from folk rock and into the new musical frontier of psychedelic rock. The folk rock sound of the Byrds has continued to influence many bands over the years, including Big Star, Tom Petty and the Heartbreakers, R.E.M., the Long Ryders, the Smiths, the Bangles, the Stone Roses, and Teenage Fanclub, among others.

=== Bob Dylan ===
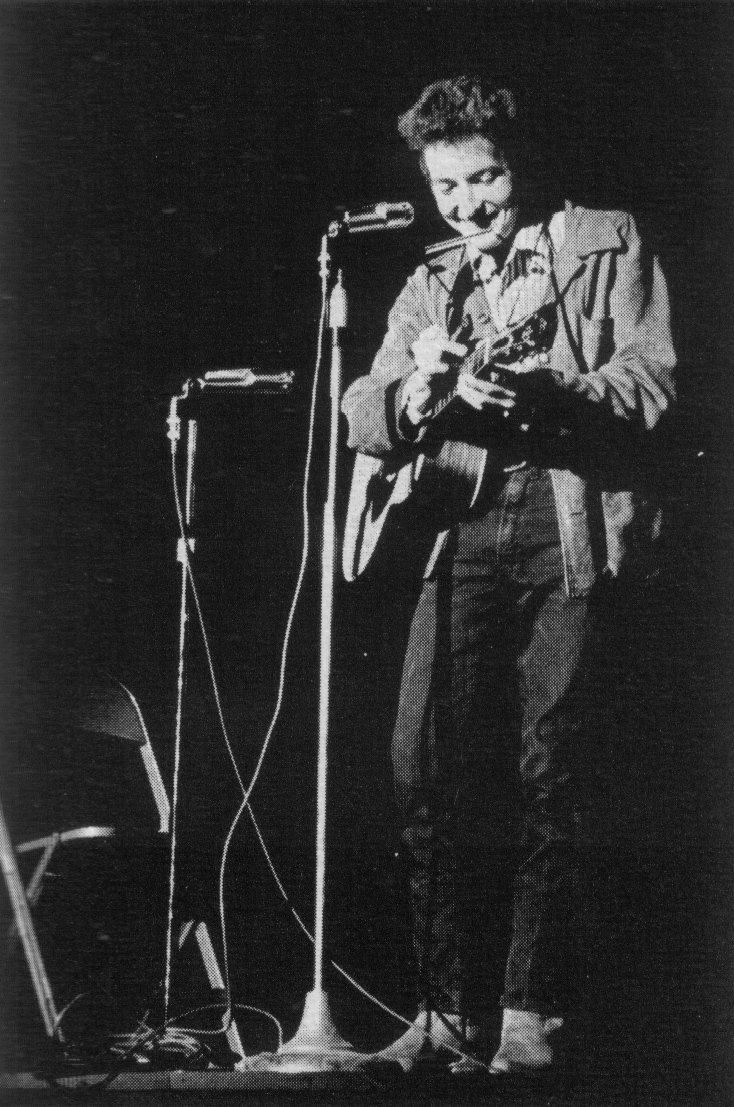
Bob Dylan in 1963.

Five days before the Byrds entered Columbia Studios in Hollywood to record his song "Mr. Tambourine Man", Bob Dylan completed the recording sessions for his fifth album, Bringing It All Back Home. Of the eleven tracks on the album, seven featured Dylan backed by a full electric rock band, in stark contrast to his earlier acoustic folk albums. Dylan's decision to record with an electric backing band had been influenced by a number of factors, including the Beatles' coupling of folk derived chord progressions and beat music, the Byrds' rock adaptation of "Mr. Tambourine Man" (which Dylan had heard at a Byrds' rehearsal in late 1964), and the Animals hit cover of "The House of the Rising Sun".

Bringing It All Back Home was released on 22 March 1965, peaking at number 6 on the Billboard Top LPs chart and #1 on the UK Album Chart. The album's blend of rhythm and blues-derived rock and abstract, poetic lyrics was immediately influential in demonstrating that intelligent lyrical content could be wedded with rock 'n' roll. The songs on the album saw Dylan leaving folk music far behind. Even with this folkier, acoustic material, Dylan's biting, apocalyptical, and often humorous lyrics went far beyond those of contemporary folk music, particularly the folk-protest music with which he had been previously associated.

On 20 July 1965, Dylan released the groundbreaking "Like a Rolling Stone", a six-minute-long scathing put-down, directed at a down-and-out society girl, which again featured Dylan backed by an electric rock band. Released just as the Byrds' cover of "Mr. Tambourine Man" topped the charts in the United States, the song was instrumental in defining the burgeoning folk rock scene and in establishing Dylan as a bona fide rock star, rather than a folksinger. "Like a Rolling Stone" managed to reach the Top 5 on both sides of the Atlantic. Five days after the release of "Like a Rolling Stone", on 25 July 1965, Dylan made a controversial appearance at the Newport Folk Festival, performing three songs with a full band. He was met with derisive booing and jeering from the festival's purist folk music crowd, but in the years since the incident, Dylan's 1965 Newport Folk Festival appearance has become widely regarded as a pivotal moment in the synthesis of folk and rock.

Dylan followed "Like a Rolling Stone" with the wholly electric album Highway 61 Revisited and the non-album single "Positively 4th Street", which itself has been widely interpreted as a rebuke to the folk purists who had rejected his new electric music. Throughout 1965 and 1966, hit singles like "Subterranean Homesick Blues", "Like a Rolling Stone", "Positively 4th Street", and "I Want You" among others, along with the Bringing It All Back Home, Highway 61 Revisited and Blonde on Blonde albums, proved to be hugely influential on the development and popularity of folk rock. Although Dylan's move away from acoustic folk music served to outrage and alienate much of his original fanbase, his new folk rock sound gained him legions of new fans during the mid-1960s. The popularity and commercial success of the Byrds and Bob Dylan's blend of folk and rock music influenced a wave of imitators and emulators that retroactively became known as the folk rock boom.

=== Tom Wilson ===
Although he started out as a jazz musician, the young, African-American Columbia Records producer Tom Wilson became known as the "mid-wife of folk-rock" for his seminal work behind the scenes. As Bob Dylan's producer during the key transitional albums The Times They Are A-Changin, Another Side of Bob Dylan, and Bringing It All Back Home, he was a key architect of Dylan's electric sound. He is perhaps even better known, however, for first discovering Simon & Garfunkel at the tail end of the folk movement and then transforming them into folk-rock superstars with the unauthorized rock remix that made a number one hit out of their previously underappreciated song, "The Sound of Silence".

=== Other musicians ===
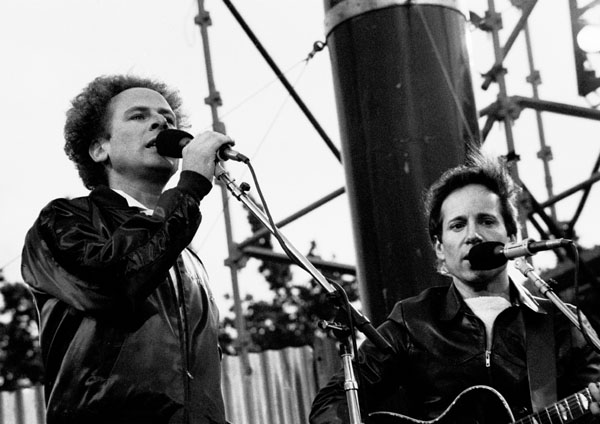
Folk rock musicians Simon & Garfunkel performing in Dublin

Music critic Richie Unterberger has noted that the commercial success of the Byrds' cover version of Dylan's "Mr. Tambourine Man", along with Dylan's own contributions to the genre on the albums Bringing It All Back Home, Highway 61 Revisited, and Blonde on Blonde, initiated an explosion of emulators and imitators. Their success led record producer Tom Wilson to add electric guitar, bass, and drums overdubs to "The Sounds of Silence", a song which had been recorded by the folk duo Simon & Garfunkel in 1964 and first released on their album Wednesday Morning, 3 A.M.. The reissued single rose to number 1 on the Billboard pop chart in late 1965, became a hit around the world, and set the duo on one of the most successful careers in pop and rock music. Simon and Garfunkel have been described as "folk-rock's greatest duo, and one whose fame and influence would persist well beyond folk-rock's heyday."

One of the first bands to craft a distinctly American sound in response to the British Invasion was the Beach Boys; while not a folk rock band themselves, they directly influenced the genre and at the height of the folk rock boom in 1966 had a hit with a cover of the 1920s West Indian folk song "Sloop John B", which they had learned from the Kingston Trio, who had learned it from the Weavers.

Much of the early folk-rock music emerged during a time of general global upheaval, the Vietnam War, and new concerns for the world by young people. In the United States, the heyday of folk rock was arguably between the mid-sixties and the mid-seventies, when it aligned itself with the hippie movement and became an important medium for expressing radical ideas. Cities such as San Francisco, Denver, New York City and Phoenix became centers for the folk rock culture, playing on their central locations among the original folk circuits. The "unplugged" and simplified sound of the music reflected the genre's connection to a critical view of a technological and consumerist society. Unlike pop music's escapist lyrics, arguably a fantasy distraction from the problems in life, folk artists attempted to communicate concerns for peace, global awareness, and other touchstones of the era. Bands whose music was significantly folk rock in sound during the mid-to-late 1960s included Donovan, the Lovin' Spoonful, the Mamas & the Papas, the Youngbloods, Love, and, in their early years, Jefferson Airplane.

In the mid-1960s, singer-songwriter Gordon Lightfoot began moving his folk songs into a folk-rock direction with recordings such as the percussion-driven "Black Day in July" about the 1967 Detroit riot. He would rise to top the charts in the 1970s with a number of his folk-rock recordings such as "Sundown" and "Carefree Highway" and eventually become known as a folk-rock legend. Some artists who originally produced with a harder edged rock sound found the ability to communicate more easily and felt more genuine in this method of delivery. In this category was Cat Stevens, who began in London much like the Byrds did in the United States but toned down the sound more frequently with acoustic instruments. He performed songs that contained concern for the environment, war, and the future of the world in general. The Canadian singer-songwriter Joni Mitchell won many Grammy Awards with her folk rock/pop songs.

== Related movements ==
=== British folk rock ===
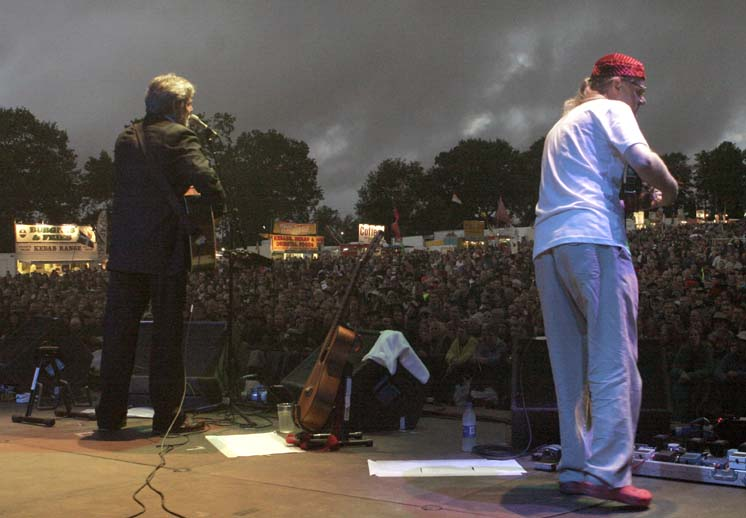
Simon Nicol and Ric Sanders of Fairport Convention performing at Fairport's Cropredy Convention 2005

British folk rock developed in Britain during the mid to late 1960s by the bands Fairport Convention, and Pentangle. It uses traditional British music and self-penned compositions in a traditional style, and is played on a combination of traditional and rock instruments. This incorporation of traditional British folk music influences gives British folk rock its distinctly British character and flavour. It evolved out of the psychedelia-influenced folk rock of British acts such as Donovan, the Incredible String Band, and Tyrannosaurus Rex, but was also heavily influenced by such American folk rock bands as the Byrds, Love, and Buffalo Springfield. British folk rock was at its most significant and popular during the late 1960s and 1970s, when, in addition to Fairport and Pentangle, it was taken up by groups such as Steeleye Span and the Albion Band.

Steeleye Span, founded by Fairport Convention bass player Ashley Hutchings, was made up of traditionalist folk musicians who wished to incorporate electrical amplification, and later overt rock elements, into their music. This, in turn, spawned the conspicuously English folk rock music of the Albion Band, a group that also included Hutchings. In Brittany folk rock was developed by Alan Stivell (who began to mix his Breton, Irish, and Scottish roots with rock music) and later by French bands like Malicorne. During this same period, folk rock was adopted and developed in the surrounding Celtic cultures of Ireland, Scotland, Wales, Brittany, and Cornwall, to produce Celtic rock and its derivatives.

=== Country folk ===
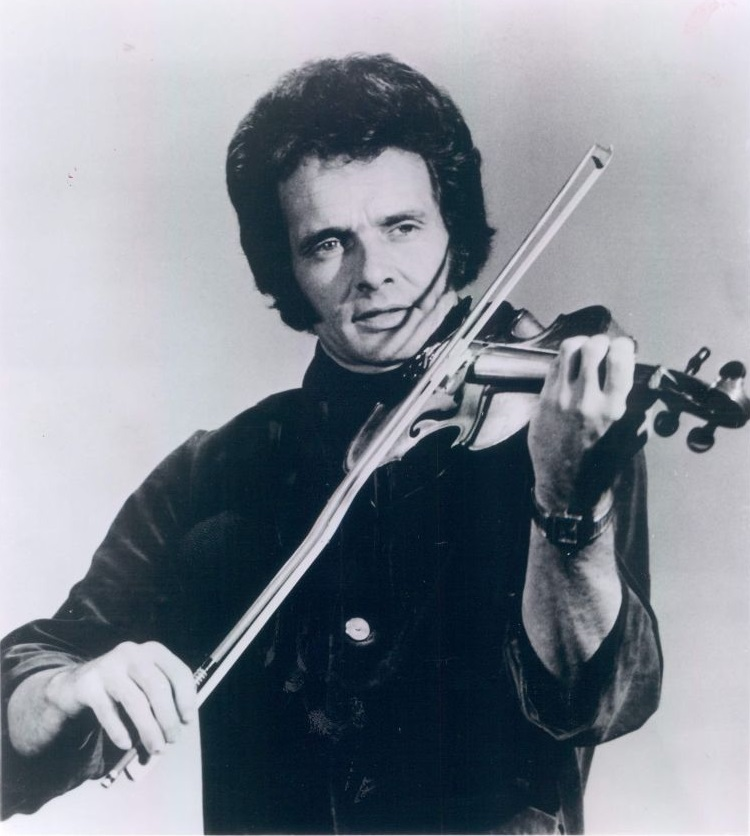
Merle Haggard and others influenced the sound of artists such as Bob Dylan, Ian and Sylvia, and the Byrds who adopted the sound of country music in the late 1960s.

A subgenre originally arising from the early 1960s folk and country-influenced music of singer-songwriter artists such as Bob Dylan and Bobby Bare, as well as from folk revivalist vocal groups like the Kingston Trio. During the late 1960s, many folk rock artists including Dylan, Ian and Sylvia, and the Byrds began to incorporate a strong country influence into their music, drawing heavily on Hank Williams, Merle Haggard, and Buck Owens amongst others, resulting in the concurrent offshoot of country rock. This successful blending of country, folk and rock styles led to pioneering country folk records by folk-influenced singer-songwriters such as John Denver and Neil Young during the 1970s. Country folk music usually displays a softer, more "laid-back" feel than the majority of country music and is often complemented by introspective lyrics, thus preserving its folk singer-songwriter roots. Since the 1970s, the country folk subgenre has been perpetuated by artists including John Prine, Nanci Griffith, Kathy Mattea, Mary Chapin Carpenter, and Iris DeMent.

=== Celtic rock ===
A subgenre of folk rock that combines traditional Celtic instrumentation with rock rhythms, often influenced by a wide variety of pop and rock music styles. It emerged from the electric folk music of the late 1960s and was pioneered by bands such as Horslips, who blended Gaelic mythology, traditional Irish music and rock. The British singer-songwriter Donovan was also influential in developing Celtic rock during the late 1960s, with his albums The Hurdy Gurdy Man, Barabajagal, and Open Road, the latter of which actually featured a song entitled "Celtic Rock".

The subgenre was further popularised in 1973 by Thin Lizzy, who had a hit with "Whiskey in the Jar", a traditional Irish song performed entirely in the rock idiom. Throughout the 1970s, Celtic rock held close to its folk roots, drawing heavily on traditional Celtic fiddle, pipe, and harp tunes, as well as traditional vocal styles, but making use of rock band levels of amplification and percussion. In the 1980s and beyond, Celtic rock was perpetuated by bands such as the Pogues, the Waterboys, Runrig, Black 47, and the Prodigals. A more recent folk rock band based in England is the BibleCode Sundays. Celtic rock is also popular in Spain where bands such as Celtas Cortos have had a large following since the early 1990s.

=== Medieval folk rock ===
Medieval folk rock developed as a subgenre of electric folk from about 1970 as performers, particularly in England, Germany and Brittany, adopted medieval and renaissance music as a basis for their music, in contrast to the early modern and nineteenth century ballads that dominated the output of Fairport Convention. This followed the trend explored by Steeleye Span, and exemplified by their 1972 album Below the Salt. Acts in this area included Gryphon, Gentle Giant and Third Ear Band. In Germany Ougenweide, originally formed in 1970 as an acoustic folk group, opted to draw exclusively on High German medieval music when they electrified, setting the agenda for future German electric folk. In Brittany, as part of the Celtic rock movement, medieval music was focused on by bands like Ripaille from 1977 and Saga de Ragnar Lodbrock from 1979. However, by the end of the 1970s almost all of these performers had either disbanded or moved, like Gentle Giant and Gryphon, into the developing area of progressive rock. In the 1990s, as part of the wider resurgence of folk music in general, new medieval folk rock acts began to appear, including the Ritchie Blackmore project Blackmore's Night, German bands such as In Extremo, Subway to Sally or Schandmaul and English bands like Circulus.

=== Progressive folk rock ===
In Britain the tendency to electrify brought several progressive folk acts into rock. This includes the acoustic duo Tyrannosaurus Rex, who became the electric combo T. Rex. Others, probably influenced by the electric folk pioneered by Fairport Convention from 1969, moved towards more traditional material, a category including Dando Shaft, Amazing Blondel, and Jack the Lad, an offshoot of northern progressive folk group Lindisfarne, who were one of the most successful UK bands of the early 1970s. Examples of bands that remained firmly on the border between progressive folk and progressive rock were the short lived (but later reunited) Comus and, more successfully, Renaissance, who combined folk and rock with elements of classical music.

=== Folk metal ===
Folk metal is a fusion genre of heavy metal music and traditional folk music that developed in Europe during the 1990s. It is characterised by the widespread use of folk instruments and, to a lesser extent, traditional singing styles (for example, Dutch Heidevolk, Danish Sylvatica and Spanish Stone of Erech). It also sometimes features soft instrumentation influenced by folk rock.

The earliest folk metal bands were Skyclad from England, Cruachan from Ireland and Mägo de Oz from Spain. Skyclad's debut album The Wayward Sons of Mother Earth was released in 1991 and would be considered a thrash metal album with some folk influences, unlike Cruachan's early work which embraced the folk element as a defining part of their sound. It was not until 1994 and 1995 that other early contributors in the genre began to emerge from different regions of Europe and beyond. Among these early groups, the German band Subway to Sally spearheaded a different regional variation that over time became known as medieval metal. Despite their contributions, folk metal remained little known with few representatives during the 1990s. It was not until the early 2000s when the genre exploded into prominence, particularly in Finland with the efforts of such groups as Finntroll, Ensiferum, Korpiklaani, Turisas, and Moonsorrow.

The music of folk metal is characterised by its diversity with bands known to perform different styles of both heavy metal music and folk music. A large variety of folk instruments are used in the genre with many bands consequently featuring six or more members in their regular line-ups. A few bands are also known to rely on keyboards to simulate the sound of folk instruments. Lyrics in the genre commonly deal with fantasy, mythology, paganism, history and nature.

== See also ==
- List of folk rock artists
- Rockabilly
- Pagan rock
