= Best of Mano Negra =

Compilation album by Mano Negra
- Released: 1 October 1998
- Recorded: 1988–1994
- Genres: Latin alternative French rock Rock en español Ska punk Worldbeat
- Length: 65:44
- Label: Virgin France S.A.
- Producer: Mano Negra

Mano Negra chronology
B.O. Du Livre (1994)	Best of Mano Negra (1998)	Illegal (2001)

Professional ratings
Review scores
Source	Rating
Allmusic	4/5 stars

Best of Mano Negra is a compilation album by Mano Negra, released in 1998. It included their greatest hits from 1988 to 1994.

== Track listing ==
1. "Mano Negra" (Manu Chao, Mano Negra) – 0:58
  - From In the Hell of Patchinko
2. "King Kong Five" (Manu Chao, Mano Negra) – 1:58
  - From Puta's Fever
3. "Soledad" (Manu Chao) – 2:34
  - From Puta's Fever
4. "Mala Vida" (Manu Chao) – 2:53
  - From Patchanka
5. "Sidi H' Bibi" (traditional, arranged by Mano Negra) – 3:27
  - From In the Hell of Patchinko
6. "Rock Island Line" (traditional, arranged by Mano Negra) – 3:03
  - From Patchanka
7. "Noche De Accion" (Manu Chao) – 2:45
  - From Patchanka
8. "Guayaquil City" (Mano Negra, Thomas Darnal) – 3:03
  - From Puta's Fever
9. "Peligro" (traditional, arranged by Mano Negra) – 2:52
  - From Puta's Fever
10. "Sueño De Solentiname" (Manu Chao) – 2:51
  - From Casa Babylon
11. "Indios De Barcelona" (Manu Chao) – 2:01
  - From In the Hell of Patchinko
12. "Mad Man's Dead" (Manu Chao, Mano Negra) – 2:03
  - From In the Hell of Patchinko
13. "Señor Matanza" (Manu Chao, Mano Negra) – 4:06
  - From Casa Babylon
14. "Out Of Time Man" (Manu Chao, Mano Negra) – 3:25
  - From King of Bongo
15. "Pas Assez De Toi" (Manu Chao, Mano Negra) – 2:19
  - From Puta's Fever
16. "King Of Bongo" (Manu Chao, Mano Negra) – 3:38
  - From King of Bongo
17. "Ronde De Nuit" (Manu Chao) – 2:55
  - From Patchanka
18. "Patchanka" (Manu Chao) – 3:05
  - From Puta's Fever
19. "Salga La Luna" (Manu Chao, Mano Negra) – 3:34
  - From Patchanka
20. "Santa Maradona" (Manu Chao, Mano Negra) – 3:27
  - From Casa Babylon
21. "El Sur" (Manu Chao, Mano Negra) – 1:00
  - From Puta's Fever
22. "Long Long Nite" (Manu Chao, Mano Negra) – 3:28
  - From King Of Bongo (S)
23. "On Telefon" (Manu Chao, Mano Negra) – 1:36
  - From Bande Originale Du Livre
24. "Darling Darling" (Manu Layotte) – 1:45
  - From In the Hell of Patchinko

== Band line-up and crew (1988 - 1994) ==
Manu Chao; Antoine Chao; Santiago Casariego; Philippe Teboul; Daniel Jamet; Olivier Dahan; Thomas Darnal; Pierre "Krøpöl" Gauthé Tomas Arroyos; Jacques Clayeux; Chino; Frank Maaut; Philippe Renaud	: Lead Vocals & Guitar : Trumpet & Vocals : Drums & Vocals : Percussion & Vocals : Lead Guitar & Vocals : Bass & Vocals : Keyboards & Vocals : Trombone & Vocals : Sound Engineer : Road & Stage : Sound Engineer : Lights : Tour Manager

== Guest musicians (1988 - 1994) ==
Anouk; Napo "Chihuahua" Romero; Jimmy Miller; Jean-Marc "Guilouli"; Alain Wampas; Dirty District (Denis, Gilles, Fred, Geo); Les Casse-Piers (Manu, Lolo, Daniel, Phillippe, Jo, Tomas)	: Vocals : Vocals : Vocals : Bass : Double Bass & Vocals : Vocals, Guitar, Bass, Synthesizer : Vocals, Guitar, Bass, Drums

== Certifications ==
Region	Certification	Certified units/sales
France (SNEP)	2× Platinum	600,000^{*}
^{*} Sales figures based on certification alone.
