= Bande Originale Du Livre =

EP (picture disc & book) by Mano Negra
- Released: 1994
- Genre: French rock
- Length: 19:06
- Label: Virgin France S.A., Syros
- Producer: Mano Negra

Mano Negra chronology
Casa Babylon (1994)	Bande Originale Du Livre (1994)	Best of Mano Negra (1998)

Bande Originale Du Livre is an EP by Mano Negra, released in 1994.

== Track listing ==
No.	Title	Writer(s)	Length
1.	"Intro"	Manu Chao	0:41
2.	"The Monkey"	Mano Negra	2:40
3.	"Retour A La Civilisation"	Manu Chao	3:00
4.	"Blood and Fire"	Manu Chao, Mano Negra	2:55
5.	"Radio DJ Au Japon: Direct Live"	Manu Chao	1:06
6.	"On Telefon"	Manu Chao, Mano Negra	1:35
7.	"Les Esprits Etaient Deja Ailleurs"	Manu Chao	4:49
8.	"Viva Zapata"	Manu Chao	2:16

== Personnel ==
- Manu Chao – lead vocals, guitar
- Antoine Chao – trumpet, vocals
- Santiago Casariego – drums, vocals
- Philippe Teboul – percussion, vocals
- Daniel Jamet – lead guitar, vocals
- Olivier Dahan – bass, vocals
- Thomas Darnal – keyboards, vocals
- Pierre "Krøpöl" Gauthé – trombone, vocals
