= Los Carayos =

French band

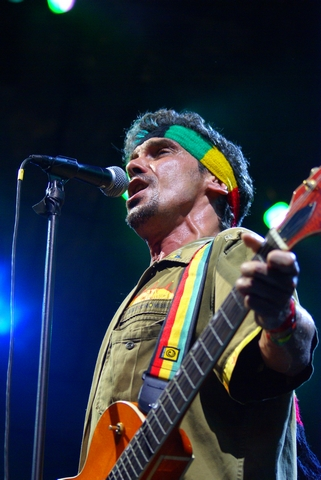
Manu Chao in Brooklyn, Prospect Park, 27 and 28 June 2007

Los Carayos was a French band which released four albums between 1986 and 1994. They were active mostly in Paris in the mid-1980s, but side interests of the musicians, notably of Manu Chao, did not allow the band to take off.

Their songs were largely of a parodic style, mixing rockabilly, punk, blues, and various genres of folk from throughout the world, especially country, and hispanic music. They were also influenced by Italian composer Ennio Morricone, who is famous for his work in movie soundtracks.

== Name ==
"Carayo" is how a Spanish or French would pronounce the Portuguese word caralho (carallo in the Galician spelling). Caralho is Portuguese for mast. The word is a popular and rude slang for the penis.

== Members ==
The members of Los Carayos have gone on to achieve success in separate projects on the French and world music scenes. The group members include:

- François Hadji-Lazaro (also in Pigalle and Les Garçons Bouchers): vocals and diverse instruments
- Manu Chao (also being in the Hot Pants, then founding Mano Negra): vocals and guitar
- Schultz from Parabellum: vocals and guitar
- Tonio Chao (Manu's brother, also being in Chihuahua, then in Mano Negra)
- Alain from Les Wampas

== Discography ==
- Hot Chicas (1986) - this album also featured music from Hot Pants
- Ils Ont Osé LIVE (1986) All or Nothing Rec. (D. Pasquier prod)
- Persistent et Signent (1987)
- Au prix où sont les courges (1994)
