= Amerika Perdida =

Compilation album by Mano Negra
- Released: 28 October 1991
- Recorded: 1989–1991
- Genre: Latin alternative Worldbeat; French rock Rock en español
- Length: 40:37
- Label: Virgin France S.A.
- Producer: Mano Negra

Mano Negra chronology
King of Bongo (1991)	Amerika Perdida (1991)	In the Hell of Patchinko (1992)

Professional ratings
Review scores
Source	Rating
Allmusic	2.5/5 stars

Amerika Perdida is a compilation album by Mano Negra, released on 28 October 1991.

== Track listing ==
All tracks composed by Manu Chao; except where indicated

1. "Mano Negra" – 1:44 [Patchanka]
2. "Mala Vida" – 2:53 [Patchanka]
3. "Amerika Perdida" (Manu Chao, Mano Negra) – 2:58
4. "Peligro" (Traditional arranged by Mano Negra) – 2:52 [Puta's Fever]
5. "Sidi H' Bibi" (Traditional arranged by Mano Negra) – 2:36 [Puta's Fever]
6. "Noche de Accion" – 2:46 [Patchanka]
7. "El Sur" – 1:00 [Puta's Fever]
8. "Patchuko Hop" (Joe "King" Carrasco) – 2:28 [Puta's Fever]
9. "Mano Negra" – 0:57 [Puta's Fever]
10. "Patchanka" (Manu Chao, Mano Negra) – 3:05 [Puta's Fever]
11. "Indios De Barcelona" – 2:34 [Patchanka]
12. "Guayaquil City" (Mano Negra, Thomas Darnal) – 3:01 [Puta's Fever]
13. "El Jako" (Manu Chao, Mano Negra) – 2:48 [King of Bongo]
14. "Soledad" – 2:34 [Puta's Fever]
15. "King Kong Five" (Manu Chao, Mano Negra) – 1:56 [Puta's Fever]
16. "Salga La Luna" – 3:34 [Patchanka]

== Personnel ==
- Manu Chao – Lead Vocals & Guitar (All Tracks)
- Antoine Chao – Trumpet & Vocals (All Tracks)
- Santiago Casariego – Drums & Vocals (All Tracks)
- Philippe Teboul – Percussion & Vocals (Tracks 4–5, 7–10, 12–15)
- Daniel Jamet – Lead Guitar & Vocals (Tracks 4–5, 7–10, 12–15)
- Joseph Dahan – Bass & Vocals (Tracks 4–5, 7–10, 12, 13–15)
- Thomas Darnal – Keyboards & Vocals (Tracks 4–5, 7–10, 12–15)
- Pierre Gauthé – Trombone & Vocals (Tracks 4–5, 7–10, 12, 14–15)

== Guest musicians ==
- Anouk – Vocals (All Tracks)
- Jean-Marc – Bass (Tracks 1, 2, 6, 11, 16)
- Mamack Vachter – Saxophone & Vocals (Tracks 1, 2, 6, 11, 16)
- Dirty District (Denis, Gilles, Fred, Geo) – Vocals, Guitar, Bass, Synthesizer (Tracks 1, 2, 6, 11, 16)
- Les Casse-Pieds (Lolo, Daniel, Phillippe, Jo, Tomas) – Vocals, Guitar, Bass, Drums (Tracks 1, 2, 6, 11, 16)
- Alain Wampas – Double Bass & Vocals (Tracks 1–2, 4–12, 14–16)
- Napo Romero – Vocals (Tracks 4–5, 7–10, 12, 14–15)
- Zofia – Vocals (Tracks 4–5, 7–10, 12, 14–15)
