= L'Essentiel =

L'Essentiel may refer to:

== Publications ==
- L'essentiel (newspaper), free newspaper in Luxembourg (2007–)
- L'essentiel (journal), regional magazine of La Rochelle (1996–)

== Music ==
- L'Essentiel many individual French compilation albums, of which the more notable include:
- (fr) Daniel Balavoine 1995
- a 2003–2004 series by EMI France, including:
- fr Jeanne Mas 2003
- fr Mireille Mathieu 2003
- L'Essentiel (Mano Negra album) 2004
