= Talco (band) =

Italian ska punk and alternative band

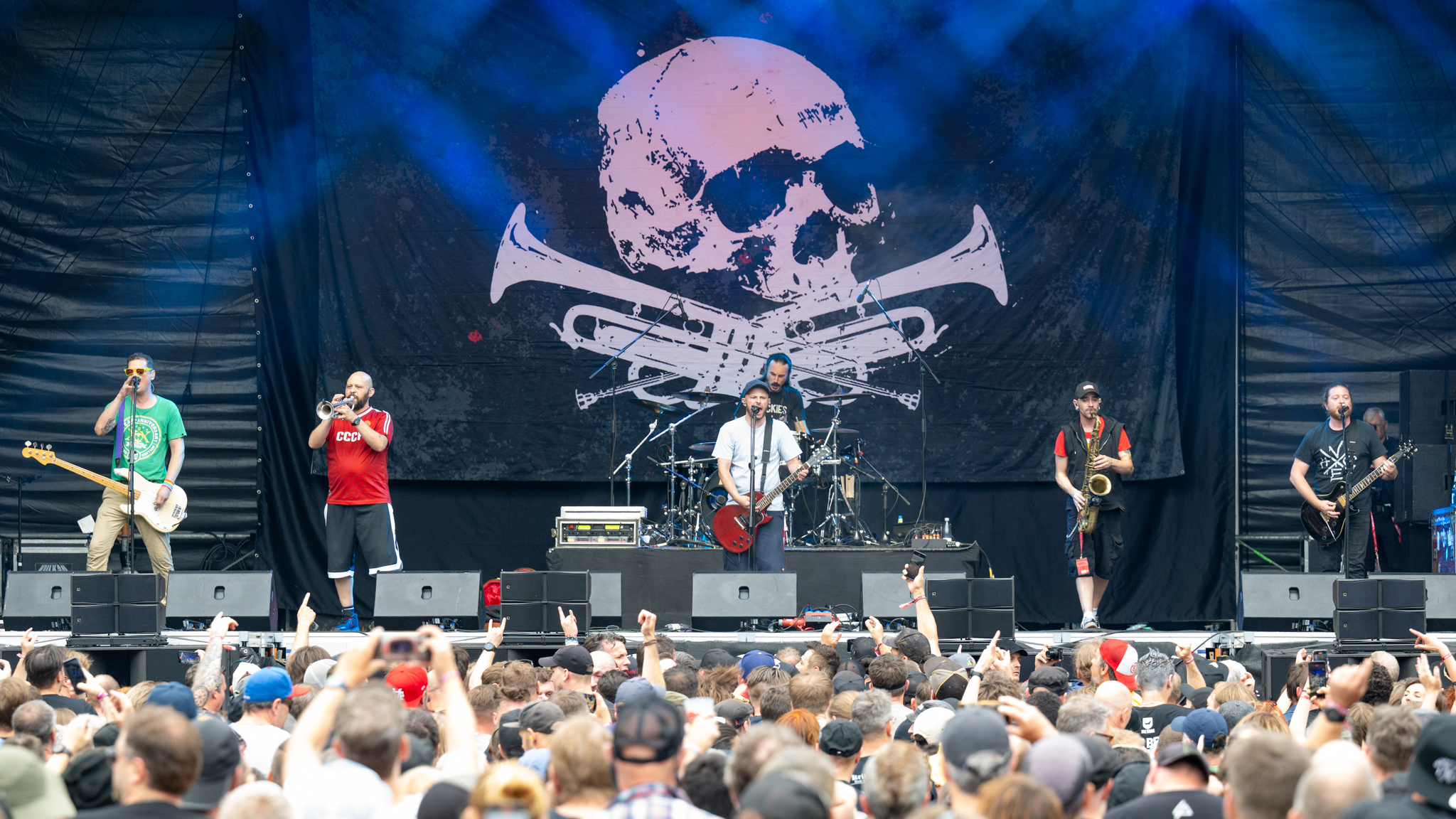
- Talco performing in 2024

Background information
- Origin: Marghera, Italy
- Genres: Ska punk, folk punk, Patchanka
- Years active: 2001–present
- Past members: Dema (Tommaso De Mattia)-guitar and vocals Jesus (Emanuele Randon)-guitar; Ketto (Marco Salvatici)-bass; Nick (Nicola Marangon)-drums; Cioro (Enrico Marchioro)-saxophone; Turborizia (Andrea Barin)-trumpet
- Website: www.talco-punkchanka.com

Talco is an Italian ska punk band and alternative band from Marghera, Venice. Musically the group combines the horns and rhythms of ska-punk with Italian folk music. Their lyrics reflect the band's support for left-wing politics and often include anti-fascist, anti-capitalist, and anti-imperialist themes. Musical influences include The Clash, Ska-P, Modena City Ramblers and especially Mano Negra, often describing their sound as "patchanka" after Mano Negra's first album.

In 2009 the group wrote the song "St. Pauli" about the cult German football club FC St. Pauli. The team has since used the song as an anthem and Talco has played a number of concerts at Millerntor-Stadion in Hamburg, Germany.

== Discography ==
=== Studio albums ===
- Tutti Assolti (2004)
- Combat Circus (2006)
- Mazel Tov (2008)
- La Cretina Commedia (2010)
- Gran Galà (2012)
- Silent Town (2015)
- And the Winner Isn't (2018)
- Locktown (2021)
- Insert Coin (2022)
- Videogame (2022)
- Others
  - Talco Mentolato (Maqueta)
  - Live (Maqueta)

=== Live albums ===
- 10 Years (Live in Iruña) (2014)

=== Compilations and collaborations ===
- 100 Jahre St. Pauli - St. Pauli
- St. Pauli EP - St. Pauli
- Skannibal Party Vol.4 - "Notti Cilene
- Nextpunk Vol.2 - L'odore della morte
- Punx United for Chapas - 60 anni
- Kob vs Mad Butcher - Corri e La Carovana
