= In the Hell of Patchinko =

- Mano Negra - In The Hell Of Patchinko

Live album by Mano Negra
- Released: 9 November 1992
- Recorded: 2 November 1991
- Venue: Chitta, Kawasaki, Japan
- Genre: Latin alternative French rock Rock en español Ska punk Worldbeat
- Length: 51:37
- Label: Virgin France S.A.
- Producer: Mano Negra

Mano Negra chronology
Amerika Perdida (1991)	In the Hell of Patchinko (1992)	Casa Babylon (1994)

Professional ratings
Review scores
Source	Rating
Allmusic	link

In the Hell of Patchinko is a live album by Mano Negra; it was recorded on 2 November 1991 in Club Citta, Kawasaki, Japan with mobile studio "Sound Creators" and released on 9 November 1992.

This album is dedicated to Marc Police, ex-guitarist of Les Wampas, who committed suicide in December 1991.

== Track listing ==
No.	Title	Length
1.	"Mano Negra (1)"	1:01
2.	"Magic Dice"	2:34
3.	"County Line"	2:21
4.	"Don't Want You No More"	3:04
5.	"Lonesome Bop"	2:33
6.	"Mano Negra (2)"	0:52
7.	"Rock Island Line"	2:38
8.	"King Kong Five"	3:55
9.	"Mad Man's Dead"	2:01
10.	"Bring The Fire"	3:29
11.	"Indios De Barcelona"	2:23
12.	"El Sur"	1:23
13.	"Killing Rats"	2:54
14.	"Mano Negra (3)"	0:40
15.	"Sidi H' Bibi"	3:27
16.	"The Rebel Spell"	3:23
17.	"I Fought the Law"	1:51
18.	"Mano Negra (4)"	0:19
19.	"Darling Darling"	1:45
20.	"Patchuko Hop"	2:32
21.	"Mala Vida"	2:31
22.	"Junky Beat"	2:18
23.	"Madeline"	1:37

== Personnel ==
- Manu Chao - Lead vocals, guitar
- Antoine Chao - Trumpet, vocals
- Santiago Casariego - Drums, vocals
- Philippe Teboul - Percussion, vocals
- Daniel Jamet - Lead Guitar, vocals
- Joseph Dahan - Bass, vocals
- Thomas Darnal - Keyboards, vocals
- Pierre Gauthé - Trombone, vocals

=== Guest musicians ===
- Chinois: Vocals (at Track 23)

== Certifications ==
Region	Certification	Certified units/sales
France (SNEP)	Gold	100,000^{*}
^{*} Sales figures based on certification alone.
