= Talco =

Talco may refer to:

- The Tajik Aluminium Company, abbreviated as TALCO
- Talco, Texas, a city in Titus County
- Talco (band), an Italian ska punk band
- Talco (band), a Costa Rican post-hardcore band
