= Puta's Fever =

Studio album by Mano Negra
- Released: 1 September 1989
- Recorded: 1989
- Studio: Mix It, Paris
- Genre: French rock
- Length: 40:37
- Label: Virgin France S.A.
- Producer: Mano Negra

Mano Negra chronology
Patchanka (1988)	Puta's Fever (1989)	King of Bongo (1991)

Professional ratings
Review scores
Source	Rating
AllMusic	4/5 stars
Chicago Sun-Times	3.5/4 stars
Entertainment Weekly	B−
Los Angeles Times	3/5 stars
NME	8/10
Record Mirror	4 1/2/5
Sounds	3.5/5 stars

Puta's Fever is the second studio album by Mano Negra, released in 1989. The French edition of Rolling Stone magazine named it the 8th greatest French rock album (out of 100).

== Track listing ==
No.	Title	Writer(s)	Length
1.	"Mano Negra"	Manu Chao	0:57
2.	"Rock 'n' Roll Band"	Manu Chao	2:33
3.	"King Kong Five"	Manu Chao, Mano Negra	1:56
4.	"Soledad"	Manu Chao	2:34
5.	"Sidi H' Bibi"	Traditional; arranged by Mano Negra	2:36
6.	"The Rebel Spell"	Traditional; arranged by Mano Negra	2:01
7.	"Peligro"	Manu Chao	2:52
8.	"Pas assez de toi"	Manu Chao	2:19
9.	"Magic Dice"	Manu Chao	1:23
10.	"Mad House"	Manu Chao, Joe Dahan	2:40
11.	"Guayaquil City"	Manu Chao, Thomas Darnal	3:01
12.	"Voodoo"	Manu Chao	3:00
13.	"Patchanka"	Manu Chao	3:05
14.	"La Rançon du succès"	Manu Chao	1:57
15.	"The Devil's Call"	Manu Chao	1:42
16.	"Roger Cageot"	Manu Chao, Daniel Jamet	2:27
17.	"El Sur"	Manu Chao	1:00
18.	"Patchuko Hop"	Joe "King" Carrasco	2:28

== Personnel ==
Mano Negra

- Oscar Tramor (Manu Chao) – lead vocals, guitar
- Tonio Del Borño (Antoine Chao) – trumpet, vocals
- Santiago "El Águila" Casariego – drums, vocals
- Garbancito (Philippe Teboul) – percussion, vocals
- Roger Cageot (Daniel Jamet) – lead guitar, vocals
- Jo (Joseph Dahan) – bass guitar, vocals
- Helmut Krumar (Thomas Darnal) – keyboards, vocals
- Krøpöl 1er (Pierre Gauthé) – trombone, vocals

Guest musicians

- Mme Oscar (Anouk) – vocals
- Napo "Chihuahua" Romero – vocals
- Alain "L'Enclume De Choisy" Wampas – double bass, vocals
- Zofia – vocals

== Charts ==
Chart	Peak position
French Albums (SNEP)	130
Dutch Albums (Album Top 100)	43

== Certifications and sales ==
Region	Certification	Certified units/sales
France (SNEP)	Platinum	350,000
Summaries
Worldwide	—	550,000
