= Ignacio Ramonet =

Spanish academic, journalist and writer (born 1943)

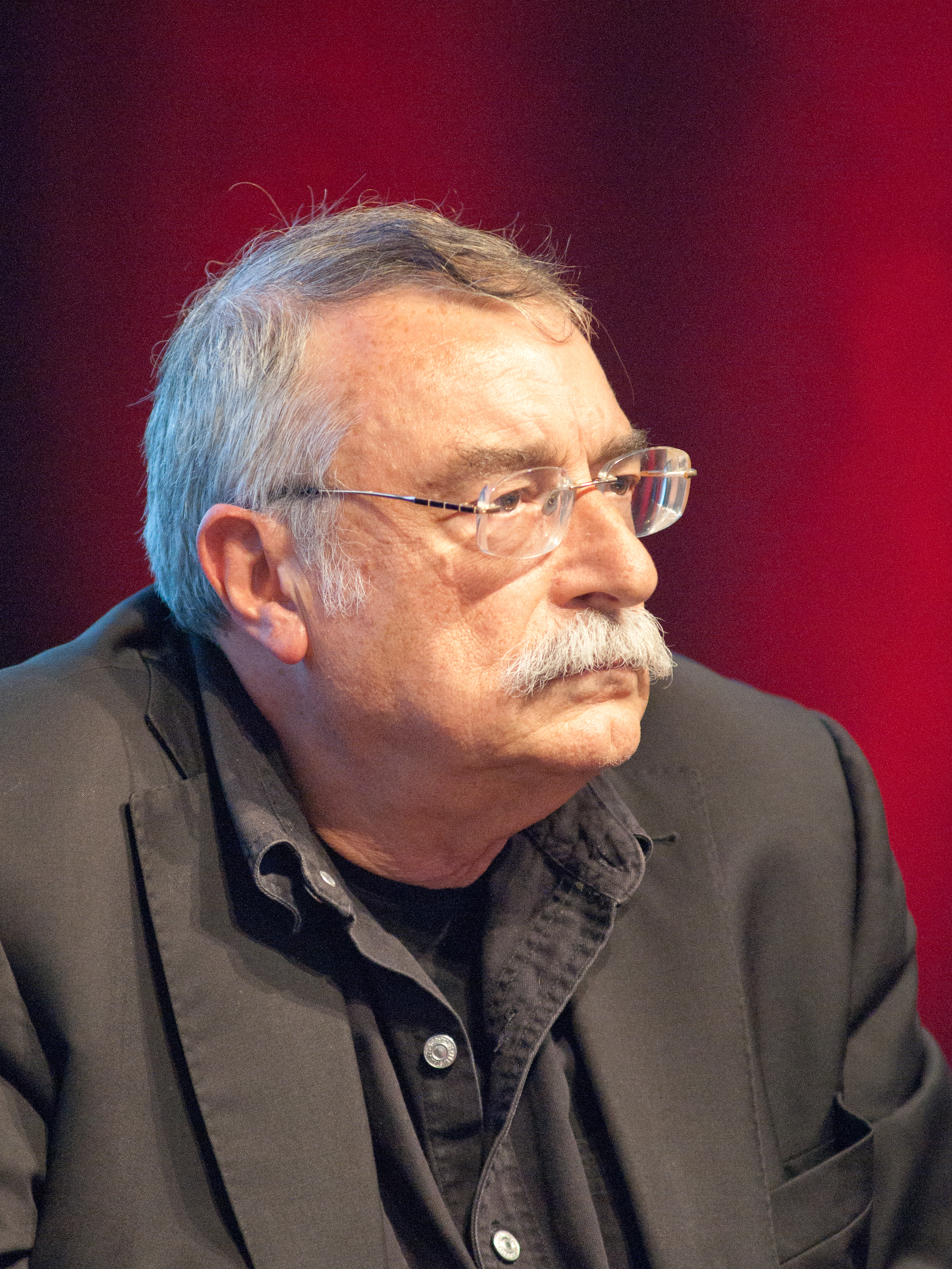
- Ramonet in Geneva, 2011
- Born: Ignacio Ramonet Miguez; 5 May 1943 (age 83); Redondela, Galicia, Spain
- Education: Bordeaux Montaigne University
- Writing career
- Years active: 1972–present
- Notable work: Fidel Castro: biografía a dos voces

Ignacio Ramonet Miguez (born 5 May 1943) is a Spanish academic, journalist, and writer who has been based in Paris for much of his career. After becoming first known for writing on film and media, he became editor-in-chief of Le Monde diplomatique, serving from 1991 until March 2008. Under his leadership, LMD established editorial independence in 1996 from Le Monde, with which it had been affiliated since 1954.

Ramonet published an editorial in December 1997 in Le Monde diplomatique on the Tobin tax that led to the launching of ATTAC. This is an activist organization promoting taxation of foreign exchange transactions. Ramonet is one of the founders of the non-governmental organization Media Watch Global, and its president. He frequently contributes to El País, among other media, and participates in an advisory council to the Venezuelan network Telesur.

== Life ==
Ramonet was born in Redondela (Pontevedra), Spain, in 1943. He went to Tangier, Morocco, to study engineering. He continued these studies at Bordeaux, Rabat and Paris. In Paris he earned a PhD in Semiology and the History of Culture, at Ecole des Hautes Etudes en Sciences Sociales (School for Advanced Studies in the Social Sciences)- EHESS, one of the French Grande Écoles.

Ramonet has been a professor of Communication Theory at Paris Diderot University. He also taught at the Paris Diderot University. He first started writing journalism as a film critic and writer about film for various magazines. Ramonet later wrote more frequently about media culture, communications, and national affairs, becoming associated with Le Monde Diplomatique, started in 1954 as a monthly publication associated with the newspaper.

Ramonet was elected as editor-in-chief in January 1991, serving to March 2008. Under his leadership, the magazine became editorially independent of Le Monde in 1996. It has been an independent critic outside academia of media culture and its ties to national society. In 2000, he received the prize "Archivio Disarmo - Golden Doves for Peace" from IRIAD. In 2007, Ramonet participated in the Stock Exchange of Visions project.

== Opinions ==
=== Socialism ===
Ramonet says that it is a betrayal of socialism for some social democrat parties to have chosen the Third Way between socialism and capitalism.

==== Fidel Castro ====
In May 2004, Ramonet supported Castro when Castro disputed the claim by Forbes that he was the seventh wealthiest head of state. In 2006, after Castro had retired from public life, Ramonet praised Castro's legacy in a series of articles in Foreign Policy. He said reforms under Castro "have proceeded from a popular movement in which the hopes of peasants, workers, and even professionals from the small urban bourgeoisie have converged". He was approved as Castro's only authorised biographer. In September 2006, Ramonet published Fidel Castro : Biografía a Dos Voces.

=== Against globalization and neoliberalism ===
Ramonet has called for autarky and for regulation, taxes and tariffs that reduce international trade.

== ATTAC ==
According to Ramonet, globalization and neoliberalism threaten the sovereignty of national states. In his December 1997 editorial "Disarming the Markets", Ramonet attributed the Asian economic crisis to globalization, and said that it threatened the identity of national states. To counter this, he called for an NGO to promote the Tobin tax on foreign exchange. He became a founder of Association for the Taxation of Financial Transactions and for Citizens' Action (ATTAC).

== Works ==
- 1981 : Le Chewing-gum des yeux (French: Chewing Gum for the Eyes)
- 1989 : La Communication victime des marchands
- 1995 : Cómo nos venden la moto, with Noam Chomsky
- 1996 : Nouveaux pouvoirs, nouveaux maîtres du monde (French: New Powers, New World Masters)
- 1997 : Géopolitique du chaos (French: Geopolitics of Chaos)
- 1998 : Internet, el mundo que llega (Spanish: Internet, the Coming World)
- 1998 : Rebeldes, dioses y excluidos (Spanish: Rebels, Gods, and the Excluded), with Mariano Aguirre
- 1999 : La Tyrannie de la communication (French: The Tyranny of Communication)
- 1999 : Geopolítica y comunicación de final de milenio (Spanish: Geopolitics and Communication at the End of the Millennium)
- 2000 : La golosina visual
- 2000 : Propagandes silencieuses
- 2001 : Marcos, la dignité rebelle
- 2002 : La Post-Télévision
- 2002 : Guerres du XXIe siècle (Wars of the 21st Century)
- 2004 : Abécédaire partiel et partial de la mondialisation, with Ramón Chao and Wozniak
- 2006: Fidel Castro: biografía a dos voces (Spanish: Fidel Castro: Biography with Two Voices) also titled Cien horas con Fidel (One Hundred Hours with Fidel)
- 2007: Fidel Castro: My Life, edited by Ignacio Ramonet, translated by Andrew Hurley, Allen Lane.
- 2018, Cinco entrevistas a Noam Chomsky (Le Monde Diplomatique / Editorial Aun Creemos en los Sueños) by Michel Foucault, Ignacio Ramonet, Daniel Mermet, Jorge Majfud y Federico Kukso. ISBN 978-956-340-126-4

== Articles ==
- Set The Media Free by Ignacio Ramonet (2003)

== See also ==
- ATTAC
- Financial transaction tax
- Tobin tax
