= Ramón Chao =

Spanish journalist and writer (1935–2018)

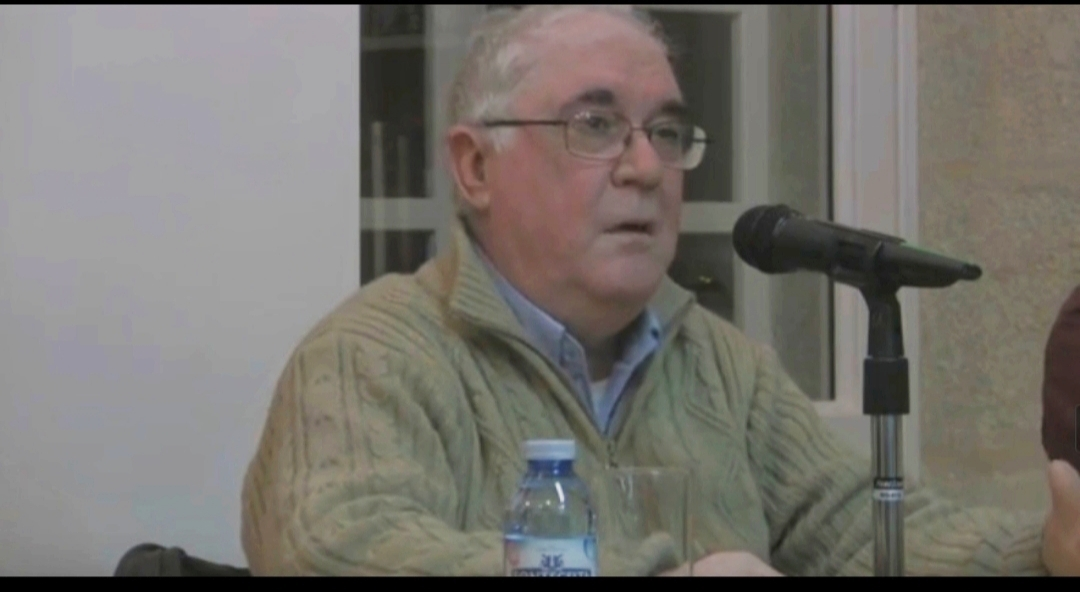
- Photo of Ramón Chao
- Born: Ramón Luis Chao Rego; 21 July 1935; Vilalba, Galicia, Spain
- Died: 20 May 2018 (aged 82); Barcelona, Spain
- Occupations: Journalist, writer
- Spouse: Felisa Ortega
- Children: Manu Chao, Antoine Chao

Ramón Luís Chao Rego (21 July 1935 – 20 May 2018) was a Spanish journalist and writer. He won the Premio de Virtuosismo for Piano in 1955. The same year he moved to Paris, France to study music with Nadia Boulanger and Lazare Lévy. In 1960 he began his collaboration with the RTF's Iberian Languages Service. He was head of this service ten years later. At the same time he was collaborating with the Spanish weekly Triunfo, the monthly Le Monde Diplomatique, and the daily newspapers Le Monde and La Voz de Galicia.

Ramón Chao was named chevalier de Ordre des Arts et des Lettres in 1991 and named as an officier in 2004. In 2003 the Spanish government awarded him the Orden del Mérito Civil. In 1997 he won the prize Premio Galicia de la Comunicación. In 2001, the Liberpress prize in Gerona for his human coherence and his solidarity in the field of journalism: “per la seva coherència humana i solidaritat periodística”.

He was the father of radio journalist Antoine Chao and of the musician and singer Manu Chao, both of them members of the Mano Negra band whose Colombian adventure was described in Ramón Chao's book Mano Negra en Colombia: Un tren de hielo y fuego.

== Bibliography ==
- Georges Brassens (1973)
- Después de Franco, España (1975)
- Guía secreta de París (1979)
- O lago de Como (1982)
- Conversaciones con Alejo Carpentier (1984)
- Un possible Onetti (1992)
- Mano negra en Colombia: Un tren de hielo y fuego (1992) (English translation: The Train of Ice and Fire, published by Route, 2009, ISBN 978-1-901-92737-5).
- Prisciliano de Compostela (1999)
- Abecedario (subjetivo) de la globalización (with Ignacio Ramonet and Jacek Woźniak)
- La pasión de la Bella Otero (2001)
- Desde mi otero (2003)
- Porque Cuba eres tú (2005)
- Las Travesías de Luis Gontán (2006)
- Las andaduras del Che with Jaceck Wozniak) (2007)
- Guia del París Rebelde con Ignacio Ramonet, (2008)
- Memorias de un invasor (2008)
- Cuba-Miracles (with Jacek Wozniak and Antoine Chao (2009)

== Films ==
- Llorens Artigas with Georges Ferraro TVF (1970)
- Arriba España with José María Berzosa and André Camp. SFP París (1976)
- Oú es-Tu ? with J.M. Berzosa FR3 (1989)
- 50 años después de la guerra, with José Maria Berzosa (1980- SFR)
- Tres días con Onetti, with José María Berzosa - SFP-Paris (1990), Océaniques

== Radio ==
- De la Bastilla a Moncada Premio Radio La Habana. ORTF (1978
- Conversaciones con Jorge Luis Borges in collaboration with Ignacio Ramonet ORTF (1980)
- Julio Cortázar Esbozo with (Adelaida Blázquez) Premio International "España" (1984)
- De Berceo al altiplano, itinerario del español Premio International "España" (1985), with Erlens Calabuig.
