= L'Essentiel (Mano Negra album) =

Compilation album by Mano Negra
- Released: 28 May 2004
- Recorded: 1988–1994
- Genre: Latin alternative Worldbeat; French rock Rock en español
- Length: 33:19
- Label: Virgin France S.A.
- Producer: Mano Negra

Mano Negra chronology
Illegal (2001)	L'Essentiel (2004)

Professional ratings
Review scores
Source	Rating
AllMusic	3/5 stars

L'Essentiel is a compilation album by Mano Negra, released on 28 May 2004.

== Track listing ==
1. "Mala Vida"; 2. "King Kong Five"; 3. "Pas Assez De Toi"; 4. "Killin' Rats"; 5. "La Ventura"; 6. "La Rançon Du Succès"; 7. "Don't Want You No More"; 8. "Madame Oscar"; 9. "El Jako"; 10. "Le Bruit Du Frigo"; 11. "Amerika Perdida"; 12. "El Alakran"	(Manu Chao) (Manu Chao / Mano Negra) (Manu Chao / Mano Negra) (Manu Chao) (Manu Chao) (Manu Chao) (Manu Chao / Mano Negra) (Manu Chao / Mano Negra) (Manu Chao / Mano Negra) (Manu Chao / Mano Negra) (Manu Chao / Mano Negra) (Manu Chao)	2:54; 1:57; 2:21; 2:25; 2:58; 1:59; 3:08; 2:39; 2:49; 3:12; 3:00; 3:51	[Patchanka] [Puta's Fever] [Puta's Fever] [Patchanka] [Patchanka] [Puta's Fever] [King Of Bongo] [King Of Bongo] [King Of Bongo] [King Of Bongo] [Amerika Perdida] [Casa Babylon]

== Personnel ==
Manu Chao; Antoine Chao; Santiago Casariego; Philippe Teboul; Daniel Jamet; Olivier Dahan; Thomas Darnal; Pierre "Krøpöl" Gauthé	: Lead Vocals & Guitar : Trumpet & Vocals : Drums & Vocals : Percussion & Vocals : Lead Guitar & Vocals : Bass & Vocals : Keyboards & Vocals : Trombone & Vocals
