= King of Bongo =

Studio album by Mano Negra
- Released: 1 April 1991
- Studio: Mix It; Conny's Studio; Roadhouse, Paris
- Genre: French rock
- Length: 41:08
- Label: Virgin France S.A.
- Producer: Mano Negra

Mano Negra chronology
Puta's Fever (1989)	King of Bongo (1991)	Amerika Perdida (1991)

Professional ratings
Review scores
Source	Rating
AllMusic	3/5 stars

King of Bongo is the third studio album by Mano Negra, released in 1991. The French edition of Rolling Stone magazine named it the 61st greatest French rock album (out of 100).

== Track listing ==
No.	Title	Writer(s)	Length
1.	"Bring the Fire"	Manu Chao, Mano Negra	3:27
2.	"King of Bongo"	Manu Chao, Mano Negra	3:38
3.	"Don't Want You No More"	Manu Chao, Mano Negra	3:07
4.	"Le Bruit du frigo"	Manu Chao, Mano Negra	3:10
5.	"Letter to the Censors"	Manu Chao, Mano Negra	2:30
6.	"El Jako"	Manu Chao, Mano Negra	2:48
7.	"It's My Heart"	Mano Negra	1:42
8.	"Mad Man's Dead"	Manu Chao, Mano Negra	2:43
9.	"Out of Time Man"	Manu Chao, Mano Negra	3:25
10.	"Mme Oscar"	Manu Chao, Mano Negra	2:37
11.	"Welcome in Occident"	Manu Chao, Mano Negra	4:20
12.	"Furious Fiesta"	Manu Chao, Mano Negra	1:26
13.	"The Fool"	Naomi Ford, Lee Hazlewood; arranged by Mano Negra	2:49
14.	"Paris la nuit"	Manu Chao	3:20

== Personnel ==
Mano Negra

- Oscar Tramor (Manu Chao) – lead vocals, guitar, accordion, keyboard
- Tonio Del Borño (Antoine Chao) – trumpet, vocals
- Santiago "El Águila" Casariego – drums, vocals
- Garbancito (Philippe Teboul) – percussion, vocals, guitar
- Roger Cageot (Daniel Jamet) – lead guitar, vocals, kazoo
- Jo (Joseph Dahan) – bass guitar, vocals, synthesizer, guitar
- Helmut Krumar (Thomas Darnal) – keyboards, vocals, guitar, triangle

Additional personnel

- Bruno Gephard – delay, noise gate, midi synch, patch
- Anouk – vocals
- Petra Fisher – "casserloe", "marmite fourneaux"
- Christa Fast – "bon esprit", "bonne companie"
- Ingo Krauff – "studio retours"
- Programe – management
- El Lagarto – mixing, reverb, compressor
- Jako – "volant", "accordeur", "loi du stage"
- La Couette "Reundüf" – tour manager
- Chinois – "retours"
- Spory – lights

== Charts ==
Chart	Peak position
Dutch Albums (Album Top 100)	72
Swedish Albums (Sverigetopplistan)	40
Swiss Albums (Schweizer Hitparade)	32

== Certifications and sales ==
Region	Certification	Certified units/sales
France (SNEP)	2× Gold	300,000
