= My Life: A Spoken Autobiography =

Autobiography of Fidel Castro

- Author: Fidel Castro
- Audio read by: Todd McLaren and Patrick Lawlor
- Original title: Fidel Castro: Biografía a dos voces
- Translator: Andrew Hurley
- Subject: Fidel Castro
- Genre: Biography
- Publisher: Scribner
- Publication date: 2006
- English publication date: 2008
- Media type: Print
- Pages: 736
- ISBN: 978-1-4165-5328-1
- OCLC: 186349018

My Life: A Spoken Autobiography by Fidel Castro and Ignacio Ramonet was published in Spanish in 2006 (Fidel Castro: Biografía a dos voces), and English in 2008. The book was written by Ramonet based on more than 100 hours of interviews with Castro.
