= The Disinherited (group) =

Spanish clandestine anarchist group

- Los Desheredados
- Leader: No leader
- Dates active: 26 September 1882 – 1885
- Split from: Federation of Workers of the Spanish Region
- Country: Spain
- Active regions: Andalusia
- Ideology: Anarcho-communism, illegalism
- Political position: Far-left

The Disinherited (Spanish: Los Desheredados) was a Spanish clandestine anarchist group that defended the use of violence framed in the doctrine of propaganda of the deed.

== History ==
After the celebration in September 1882 of the 2nd Congress of the Federation of Workers of the Spanish Region (FTRE) in Seville, the illegalists and anarcho-communists, contrary to the official anarcho-collectivist line which defended of legal and public action, were expelled. These, among whom were Miguel Rubio, Francisco Gago, Pedro José Durán, Manuel Oca, Rafael Romero, Andrés Barbadilla, José Rachel, Ricardo Arana, José Ponce and Antonio Bonilla, constituted a new federation under the name of Los Desheredados. In their press organ The Social Revolution they would denounce three years later that the Federal Commission had concealed the agreement of the London Congress of 1881 favorable to "propaganda of the deed", and had led the FTRE "as if by the charm of the revolutionary terrain to legalism".

The expelled held a congress at the end of 1882, and then two more in Seville (1883) and in Cádiz (1884) —the latter, the FTRE called a "congress of the disturbers". It was in the Seville Congress that they consolidated how they organized, starting from then on their expansion, as told by The Social Revolution in its April 1885 issue, in which reference was also made to the affair of the Black Hand harshly criticizing the position adopted by the FTRE Federal Commission, accusing it of being an accomplice of the bourgeoisie, thus reflecting the rupture that had occurred within the Spanish anarchism:

As a consequence of the right spirit of that congress, the organization was developing in an extraordinary way, despite the bad means put into play by the federal commission appointed in the Seville public congress; the one to represent the comedy of the Black Hand in Andalusia, chose in it a characteristic role, that of "Slanderer".
It found the occasion (in union with the bourgeoisie) of "knowingly" confusing the workers who were in agreement with its procedures, with certain individual facts that occurred between organized workers belonging to the Spanish Regional Federation; to those who, after having flattered them repeatedly in their acts of ignorance, and eating the pennies that those wretches sent them, had no problem slandering them and betraying them to the bourgeoisie, in the terrible days of revenge.

Its scope of action was the provinces of Málaga, Cádiz and Seville – more specifically the quadrilateral of the Baja Andalucía formed by Seville, Málaga, Algeciras and San Lúcar de Barrameda – although they claimed to have associates in three Valencian and three Catalan towns (Gràcia, Sant Martí de Provençals and Sabadell). They advocated the use of violence in order to accelerate the social revolution. They were suspicious of the reformist and legalistic tactics of the Federal Commission, in addition to vindicating the positions of the anarchist Congress of London of 1881 favorable to violence and clandestine struggle. However, illegalism and propaganda of the deed was not accompanied by a doctrinal anarcho-communist definition, but at least at the beginning they continued to be collectivist partisans. "It seems that we will have to wait until the middle of 1885 for anarcho-communism, which was later called libertarian communism, to finally begin to take shape."

According to Josep Termes, "they presented themselves as heirs of the AIT, declared the bourgeoisie "outside the law of nations" and decided to structure themselves into secret groups, made up of a maximum of five or ten people each (affinity groups), as they considered that workers' society was anachronistic and authoritarian.”

The persecution of the Andalusian anarchists as a consequence of the Mano Negra affair also affected Los Desinherdados, starting their decline thereafter.

According to Miguel Iñiguez, "the split of Los Desheredados confirmed the fragile unity of the FTRE and that there was a current contrary to circumstantial compromises and favorable to insurrectionary policy, for which the FTRE did not take into consideration the desperate situation of the proletariat Andalusian peasant".

== See also ==
- Anarchism in Spain
- Secret society

== Bibliography ==
- Avilés Farré, Juan (2013). La daga y la dinamita. Los anarquistas y el nacimiento del terrorismo (in Spanish). Barcelona: Tusquets Editores. ISBN 978-84-8383-753-5.
- Iñiguez, Miguel (2001). Esbozo de una Enciclopedia histórica del anarquismo español (in Spanish). Madrid: Fundación de Estudios Libertarios Anselmo Lorenzo. ISBN 84-86864-45-3.
- Termes, Josep (2011). Historia del anarquismo en España (1870-1980) (in Spanish). Barcelona: RBA. ISBN 978-84-9006-017-9.
