= José María Berzosa =

Spanish TV director (1928–2018)

- Born: José María Berzosa; 15 August 1928; Albacete, Spain
- Died: 2 January 2018 (aged 89); Paris, France
- Education: Institut des hautes études cinématographiques
- Occupations: Film director, screenwriter, author
- Years active: 1959–2001
- Known for: Jorge Luis Borges: Le passé qui ne menace pas (1969); Jorge Luis Borges: Les journées et les nuits (1969); Arriba España (1975); Chile: Impressions (1976); Juan Carlos Onetti (1989); Rafael Alberti (1996)

José Maria Berzosa (15 August 1928 – 2 January 2018) was a Spanish television director who lived the most part of his life auto–exiled in France.

His documentaries are characterized by having the humor of Luis Buñuel and the erudition of Jorge Luis Borges. His work details objectivity ideas in favor of staging (even when he films «the real» and claims creative subjectivity).

One of his most important productions was "Chile Impresiones" (1976), a documentary for French television whose purpose was to discredit the international image of the Augusto Pinochet dictatorship, the de facto administration that justified its human rights violations in the name of order and depoliticization. The novelty of this film lies in its exposure of the Chilean reality using a methodology that combined ridicule with intimate scenes of everyday life. Berzosa interviewed three Chilean generals, asking them questions on ontological themes such as philosophy and aesthetics about happiness, ethics and art, which none of them, except to some extent Gustavo Leigh, knew how to answer. The Military Junta generals only discovered how Berzosa had portrayed them after the documentary was broadcast.

== Biography ==
Born in Albacete, he was a film critic during his youth in Spain. However, in 1956, he decided to leave the Iberian country for political reasons that involved clash of francoism censorship towards his potential professional development.

He died on 2 January 2018 aged 89.

== Works ==
- 1959: Les Cinq Dernières Minutes (assistant réalisateur stagiaire de Claude Loursais)
- 1967: Le Musée de Sèvres
- 1967: Le Musée de la police
- 1967: La realidad supera a la ficción
- 1967: Miguel Ángel Asturias, un maya a la cour du roi Gustave
- 1968: Alberto Giacometti
- 1968: Luis Buñuel tourne La Voie lactée
- 1969: Festival Théâtral de Nancy
- 1969: Dubuffet
- 1969: Giacometti
- 1969: L'architecture paysanne en Iran
- 1969: Jorge Luis Borges : Le passé qui ne menace pas
- 1969: Jorge Luis Borges : Les journées et les nuits
- 1970: Matisse
- 1970: Le malentendu du design
- 1970: Daumier
- 1970: Brouillon d’un reportage autour Pablo Ruiz Picasso, artiste-peintre
- 1970: Julio González
- 1971: Colette/Sido
- 1971: Fernand Léger
- 1971: Le christianisme au Portugal
- 1971: Francis Bacon : l’ultime regard
- 1972: La musique de l’exil, les Russes
- 1972: Rouge, Greco, rouge
- 1972: Charles Fourier
- 1973: L’amour et la charité
- 1973: Zurbarán, la vie des moines et l’amour des choses
- 1973: Espagnes
- 1974: Retour au Portugal I : Lourdes Castro de Madere
- 1974: Retour au Portugal II : Les intellectuels
- 1975: ¡Arriba España!
- 1976: Chili Impressions : Les pompiers de Santiago / Voyage au bout de la droite / Au bonheur des généraux / Monsieur le Président
- 1977: Les candidates de Saint-Amour
- 1978: Des choses vues et entendues ou rêvées en Bretagne à partir desquelles Dieu nous garde de généraliser
- 1979: Import Export
- 1979: Coupez les cheveux de quatre mouches entre midi et quatorze heures
- 1979: Joseph et Marie : les mots et les gestes
- 1980: Quatre adresses pour Viollet-le-Duc
- 1981: Eduardo Chillida
- 1981: Tomi Ungerer
- 1982: Haïti : Entre Dieu et le président / Les lois de l'hospitalité / Les enfants de Millbrook
- 1983: Antonio Saura, quelques rêveries d’un promeneur solitaire
- 1983: La leçon de cinéma de François Truffaut
- 1983: Entre-Temps
- 1985: De la sainteté I-II-II-IV
- 1987: Ceux qui se souviennent
- 1989: Juan Carlos Onetti
- 1990: Iconoclasme
- 1992: Montaigne aimé autour de nous
- 1993: Où es-tu ? (Le diable en Galicie)
- 1995: L'éducation, la souffrance, le plaisir
- 1995: Le Château de Liechtenstein et le Paternoster de Prague
- 1996: Franco, un fiancé de la mort
- 1996: Rafael Alberti
- 2001: Pinochet et ses trois généraux
