= Casa Babylon =

Studio album by Mano Negra
- Released: 6 May 1994
- Studios: Studio Ornano, Paris
- Genre: French rock
- Length: 49:22
- Label: Virgin France S.A.
- Producer: Mano Negra

Mano Negra chronology
In the Hell of Patchinko (1992)	Casa Babylon (1994)	Bande Originale Du Livre (1994)

Professional ratings
Review scores
Source	Rating
AllMusic	4.5/5 stars

Casa Babylon is the fourth and final studio album by Mano Negra, released in 1994.

== Track listing ==
No.	Title	Writer(s)	Length
1.	"Viva Zapata"	Mano Negra	2:04
2.	"Casa Babylon"	Manu Chao, Mano Negra	2:34
3.	"The Monkey"	Dave Bartholomew, Mano Negra	2:47
4.	"Señor Matanza"	Manu Chao, Mano Negra	4:06
5.	"Santa Maradona"	Manu Chao, Mano Negra	3:27
6.	"Super Chango"	Manu Chao, Mano Negra	2:53
7.	"Bala Perdida"	Fidel Nadal, Manu Chao, Mano Negra	2:13
8.	"Machine Gun"	Manu Chao, Mano Negra	4:25
9.	"El Alakran"	Manu Chao	3:50
10.	"Mama Perfecta"	Traditional; arranged by Mano Negra	1:54
11.	"Love and Hate"	Manu Chao, Mano Negra, José Manuel Ortega Heredia "Manzanita"	2:28
12.	"Drives Me Crazy"	Manu Chao, Mano Negra	3:38
13.	"Hamburger Fields"	Manu Chao, Mano Negra	3:14
14.	"La Vida"	Manu Chao, Philippe Teboul, J.M. Andre	2:41
15.	"Sueño De Solentíname"	Manu Chao	3:51
16.	"This Is My World"	Mano Negra	4:57

== Personnel ==
Mano Negra

- Manu Chao – lead vocals, guitar
- Antoine Chao – trumpet, vocals
- Santiago Casariego – drums, vocals
- Philippe Teboul – percussion, vocals
- Daniel Jamet – lead guitar, vocals
- Joseph Dahan – bass guitar, vocals
- Thomas Darnal – keyboards, vocals
- Pierre "Krøpöl" Gauthé – trumpet, vocals
- Fidel Nadal – vocals

Guest musicians

- Anouk – vocals
- Ana – vocals
- Rocio – vocals
- Djerba – vocals
- Abraham – vocals
- Jhonder – vocals
- Carlos de Nicaragua – vocals
- Napo Romero – vocals
- Matéo Van Vliet – vocals
- Jello Biafra – vocals
- Les Moskokids – vocals
- Tempo – bass guitar (9)

== Charts ==
Chart	Peak position
Swiss Albums (Schweizer Hitparade)	32

== Certifications ==
Region	Certification	Certified units/sales
Spain (Promusicae)	Gold	50,000^{^}
^{^} Shipments figures based on certification alone.
