= Mano Negra (band) =

French music group

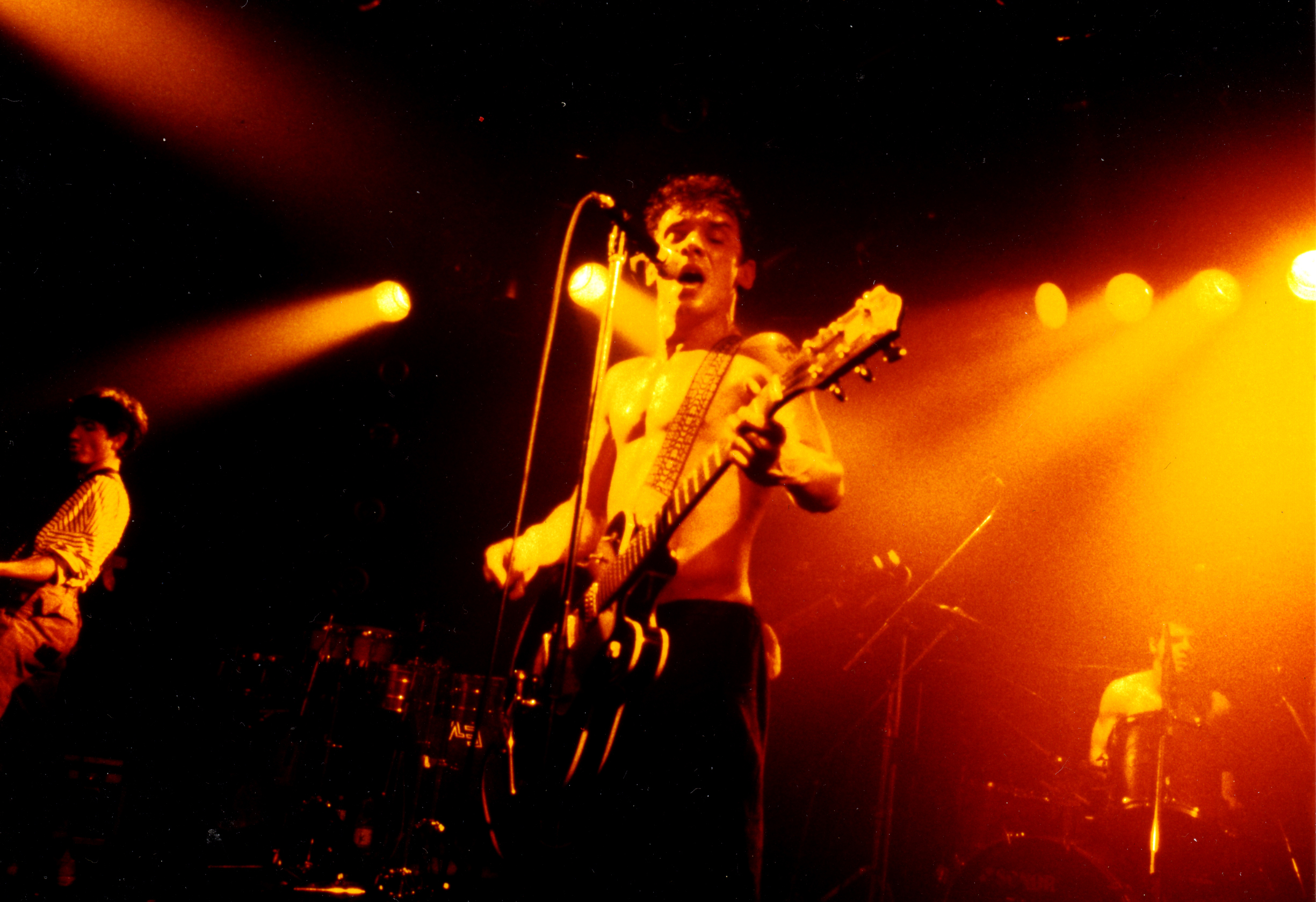
- Mano Negra live at Club Quatro, Shibuya, Tokyo, 1990.

Background information
- Origin: Paris, France
- Genres: Latin alternative; ska punk; rock en Español; French rock; worldbeat
- Years active: 1987–1994
- Label: Virgin
- Past members: Manu Chao; Antoine Chao; Santiago Casariego; Joseph Dahan; Pierre Gauthé; Thomas Darnal; Daniel Jamet; Philippe Teboul

Mano Negra (complete Spanish name: La Mano Negra, sometimes abbreviated to La Mano in France) was a French music group active from 1987 to 1994 and fronted by Manu Chao. The group was founded in Paris by Chao, his brother Antoine and their cousin Santiago, all born of Galician and Basque parents with partly Cuban roots. Their songs were mostly in Spanish, English and French, often switching from one language to the other in the same song or in the middle of a sentence or title (e.g. "Puta's Fever"). They also had a hit song in Arabic. They are considered pioneers of world fusion.

Mano Negra incorporated an impressive array of musical styles: punk rock, folk, flamenco, ska, salsa, French chanson, hip-hop, raï, rockabilly, reggae and African rhythms. They also made frequent use of samples of everyday sounds, electronica and experimental post-production techniques. This omnivorous approach, based on absorption and combination of a broad range of styles and sounds, was termed patchanka by the group (literally "patchwork", and the name of their first album). Taking Paris by storm in the winter of 1988–9, Mano Negra was touring the world by the following spring, achieving mainstream success in most of Europe and South America and recording a live album in Japan. However, their embrace by the English-speaking world remained limited. "Mala Vida" (1988, later covered by Gogol Bordello), "King Kong Five" (1990), "Out of Time Man" (1991) and "The Monkey" (1994) are among their most famous songs.

The group earned a cult following through its eclectic sound and festive performances. After the release of their highly anticipated second album, Mano Negra famously declined to play the major Paris venues and toured only the cabarets of Pigalle instead (in accordance with the theme of the album, Puta's Fever i.e. "whore's fever"), sometimes ending their sets with illegal street performances. In 1992 they celebrated the 500th anniversary of Columbus's voyage with a Latin American tour completed on a cargo ship in which a street of Nantes had been recreated. ("[H]aving transported a street of Paris [sic] across the Atlantic is a marvel [una maravilla]", commented Gabriel García Márquez who visited the attraction.) It included a performance at the Earth Summit where they were joined on stage by Jello Biafra of the Dead Kennedys.

Their last and most exploratory album, Casa Babylon (1994), was released right before the band's split. The band was signed up to play at Stockholm Vattenfestival, summer 1994, however, its fans received the news about the cancellation and subsequent split of the band right before the concert.

Frontman Manu Chao went on to have a successful solo career, bringing some of Casa Babylon's songs to the stage with his group Radio Bemba Sound System. Mano Negra is now considered a cult band and still spreads their spirit to multiple acts around the world.

== Name ==
The band's name came to the group when reading a comic—the Condor series by Dominique Rousseau. "Mano Negra" was the name of a group of guerrilla fighters in South America, and the band liked the black-hand symbol. Ramón, the father of the Chao brothers, a political exilee of the Francoist dictatorship in Spain living in France, explained to Manu the historical origins of the name which referred to an alleged secret, anarchist organization persecuted by the government. The band considered the name a good choice.

== Origins ==
In mid-1980s France, alternative rock bands such as Bérurier Noir, Noir Désir, and Los Carayos were leading the local scene. It is in this context that the musician Manu Chao, with the intention of recording some songs he had written that did not fit into the groups he had previously been a member of, decided to start a band with his brother, trumpeter Antoine Chao, and his cousin, drummer Santi Casariego. Needing more musicians, they called the group "Dirty District" and recorded the 1987 EP Takin' it up (Boucherie Productions). Also included in the initial combo was Jo Dahan on bass, from the legendary French punk band Les Wampas.

After the recording, the group dissolved temporarily, with three members participating in other projects: Manu in Les Casse Pieds, Antoine with The Kingsnakes and Los Carayos with Santi. However, the following year, they recorded their first LP, Patchanka. The album contains songs previously written by Manu Chao and featuring Dirty District along with other musicians from Les Casse Pieds, Hot Pants and Los Carayos. Patchanka is an album that reflects the DIY ethos of the era, made on a budget and with imagination, and Manu Chao allowed the recording of several songs as unedited renditions: "Mala Vida", "Indios de Barcelona" and "Ronde de Nuit", among others.

The laborious search for the "patchanka" sound did not stop there, as Manu continued to collaborate with other groups. All the while Patchanka was continuing to accumulate good reviews. Daniel Jamet (lead guitar), Jo Dahan (bass) and Philippe Teboul (drums), three members of Les Casse Pieds, decided to join the Mano Negra project and would later be joined by keyboardist Tomas Darnal. The group toured France and drew media attention, getting a record deal with major label Virgin Records France. This attracted criticism from the French alternative scene but otherwise allowed them to pay for their travels.

== Success ==
In 1989 the band started recording their second LP, Puta's Fever ("Whore's Fever"), the title being an ironic stab at the contempt with which other groups were treating them for signing with Virgin Records. Pierre Gauthe, trombone, joined as the eighth member of the group, and they went on tour to Latin America, choosing countries like Peru or Ecuador that were unaccustomed to hosting foreign rock bands and causing a sensation by performing free concerts in auditoriums and public places. Recording concluded on Puta's Fever, considered one of the best albums of the group, which mixes Tex-Mex ("Patchuko Hop"), Arabic songs ("Sidi H'Bibi"), flamenco, etc.

Enriched with the Latin American experience and basking in the success of the new album in France and other European countries, in 1990 they began a world tour to more than fifteen countries, including Japan, Holland, Germany and the United States, where they opened for Iggy Pop. However, the U.S. tour was not a good experience, and the band decided not to pursue the Anglo market.

During 1991, while the group continued to tour the European continent, its members began to show signs of disunity. However, they began recording in Cologne (Germany) what would become their third LP, King of Bongo. The album, which was not well received by critics, included more lyrics in English, fewer Latin rhythms and more rock and hardcore sounds. Among the English-language songs are "Mad Man's Dead", "Out of Time Man" and "Bring the Fire". Later, the group performed what would be its last concert in Paris with all its members in the parvis of la Défense, with attempts to cancel the show by the municipality.

== Worldwide tours ==
Later that same year, 1991, during one of its Japanese tours, they decided to record the only live album of the group, In the Hell of Patchinko, recorded during two concerts in the city of Kawasaki (Japan). The work captures, in essence, the energy of the live band, as Mano Negra was a band of performance, which owed much of its success to its eccentric performances and travel. Precisely in this year, they started the Cargo 92 project, embarking from the city of Nantes in the cargo ship Melquiades with the theater company Royal de Luxe in order to start a boat trip to South America subsidized by the French government. The tour, which lasted nearly five months and visited countries such as Colombia, Venezuela, Dominican Republic, Mexico, Cuba, Ecuador, Brazil, Uruguay and Argentina and featured free performances in public places, witnessed the weakening of the group. After four months without a break in unfavorable economic conditions, the rebellious spirit of the group showed signs of unwillingness to continue. In July 1992, in Buenos Aires (Argentina), Mano Negra gave its last concert with all original members, preceded by an incident on the television program La TV ataca where the keyboard player broke a monitor. That same year, they released the compilation album Amerika Perdida ("Lost America").

Upon returning from South America, the tension between group members continued to grow and trumpeter Antoine left the band. The rest of the band, especially Manu, worked on what would become their next album, Casa Babylon ("Babylon House"), an album like King of Bongo, unrelated to their previous albums. At the same time, the group published a biographical book collection that includes a picture disc Bande Originale Du Livre with new songs, some included later in the album Casa Babylon. During the recording sessions, Jo Dahan and Daniel Jamet also left the group, allowing in new members who were not welcomed by some former members. Among them were Fidel Nadal, Argentine vocalist from Todos Tus Muertos, and Gambeat, the bass player from Manu's new band French Lovers. The result of the recordings was the only concept album from the group; piece by piece, it becomes a party of Latin rhythms mixed with shreds of rock and hardcore.

The group as such did not perform tracks from Casa Babylon live although several of its members gave performances in Spain under different names, such as "Larchuma FC" or "Radio Bemba", and collaborated with other groups, especially the Basque alternative rock band Negu Gorriak.

== End ==
In late 1993, several members of the group decided to make a trip by train through Colombia during which they were joined by members of the groups Royal de Lux and French Lovers. After two weeks of travel, and after the last of their two concerts in Santa Marta and Aracataca, all other members of the group except Manu and Thomas decided to return to Paris. It was the end of an era, which Ramon Chao described in the book The train of Ice and Fire: Mano Negra in Colombia.

However, in 1994 the details were finalized for the start of the album Casa Babylon, which wasn't released in either the United States or Britain. The music video of the song "Señor Matanza" (Mr. Slaughter) brought more publicity to the band in Latin America, where their popularity had been on the rise. The band was already dissolved, a fact ignored by many of its admirers. Meanwhile, among the old members there were two possibilities for the future of Mano Negra: continuity of the band with some freedom for other participants to enter while leaving the door open for the original members to return or, alternately, the group could cease to exist under the Mano Negra name. This second approach was chosen.

In 1995, Manu Chao and other members of the band wanted to continue to offer concerts in Madrid but, due to the restriction on the use of the former name of the group, had to do so as "Radio Bemba"—a project that was also ultimately dissolved. In 1998, the compilation album Best of Mano Negra was released, including 22 hits and two previously unreleased tracks. The album was well received, although it was criticized for the fact that it was released just as the LP Clandestino, Manu Chao's solo album, was having some success.

In 2005, there was a planned release of a double DVD of the group with six hours of concerts, documentaries, and rare images of the band's history. Manu Chao was not involved in the production but six other members—Jo, Tom, Phillipe, Daniel, Antoine and Pierre—offered interviews to promote the work. In a presentation to France Inter's program Le Fou du Roi, they performed three numbers: "Jamie Jamie", "Sidi H'Bibi" and a version of "Jesus Reviens" (Jesus Return) that they titled "Manu Reviens", calling on the former leader of the group to return. In December 2005, the same members participated in a festival as "Mano Negra Sound System", playing the song "Sidi H'Bibi" and others, but more like DJs, as they contributed only brass and keyboards.

== Manu Chao solo ==
After the band split, Manu Chao continued his solo career, always committed with political and social issues, immigration, ghettos, and injustice, sometimes releasing albums completely in Spanish, and others in French. His Clandestino album aimed to feature groups from diverse backgrounds, such as Mexico's Tijuana No!, Brazil's Skank, and Argentina's Todos Tus Muertos. The goal was to replicate the sound of street music and bar scenes from a variety of cultures. The album was a major success in Latin America; though not an instant success in Europe, it eventually earned the Best World Music Album award in 1999's Victoires de la Musique awards and sold in excess of 5 million copies worldwide. This success was followed by Próxima Estación: Esperanza ("Next station: Hope"), released in 2001, with similar Latin, Caribbean, and ska sounds. Two years later, Chao returned to his French roots, with the French-only album Sibérie m'était contée ("All About Siberia").

Though Chao is quite well known in Europe and Latin America, he has not had the same success in the English-speaking world. Tours in the United States with Mano Negra were not as successful as elsewhere and Chao seems inclined to focus his efforts in the places where his musical style finds its roots. Though his live performances in the U.S. are infrequent, Chao played a handful of dates there in 2006, including a headline show at Lollapalooza 2006 in Chicago, IL, "Celebrate Brooklyn" in 2007, and at Merriweather Post Pavilion in Columbia, Maryland to a sellout crowd on 23 June 2007. He was one of the headliners at the 2008 Austin City Limits Music Festival (Texas) and the Outside Lands Music Festival in Golden Gate Park (San Francisco, CA).

In 2011 he took his "La Ventura" tour to several cities around the United States.

== Band members ==
- Manu Chao (Oscar Tramor) – lead vocals, rhythm guitar (1987–1995)
- Antoine Chao (Tonio Del Borño) – trumpets, vocals (1987–1992)
- Santiago Casariego (Santi El Águila) – drums, vocals (1987–1993)
- Philippe Teboul (Garbancito) – percussion, vocals (1989–1993)
- Daniel Jamet (Roger Cageot) – lead guitar, vocals (1989–1992)
- Joseph Dahan (Jo) – bass, vocals (1989–1993)
- Thomas Darnal (Helmut Krumar) – keyboards, vocals (1989–1995)
- Pierre Gauthé (Krøpöl 1er) – trombone, vocals (1989–1993)

== Discography ==
=== Singles ===
Year	Single	Peak positions				Album
Year	Single	FRA	NED	BEL (FLA)	UK	Album
1987	"Takin' It Up"	—	—	—	—	Patchanka
1988	"Mala Vida"	—	—	—	—	Patchanka
1990	"King Kong Five"	—	8	11	95	Puta's Fever
1990	"Patchanka"	—	—	—	—	Puta's Fever
1990	"Rock 'N' Roll Band"	—	—	—	—	Puta's Fever
1990	"Pas assez de toi"	32	—	—	—	Puta's Fever
1991	"Sidi h'bibi"	47	—	—	—	Puta's Fever
1991	"King of Bongo"	38	—	—	—	King of Bongo
1991	"Madame Oscar"	—	—	—	—	King of Bongo
1991	"Out of Time Man"	—	—	—	—	King of Bongo
1992	"Don't Want You No More"	—	—	—	—	King of Bongo
1993	"Mad Man's Dead"	—	—	—	—	King of Bongo
1994	"Señor Matanza"	—	—	—	—	Casa Babylon
1994	"Santa Maradona (Larchuma Football Club)"	42	—	—	—	Casa Babylon
"—" denotes releases that did not chart or were not released.

=== Studio albums ===
- 1988: Patchanka
- 1989: Puta's Fever
- 1991: King of Bongo
- 1994: Casa Babylon

=== Live recordings ===
- 1992: In the Hell of Patchinko

=== Compilations ===
- 1991: Amerika Perdida (Lost America)
- 1998: Best of
- 2004: L'Essentiel (The Essential)

=== Other releases ===
- 1994: Bande Originale Du Livre (picture disc)
- 2001: Mano Negra Illegal (tribute album)

== Video ==
=== DVD ===
- 2005: Out of Time (DVD)

== Media ==
=== Television ===
- Les Nuls L'émission, canal +, France 1990
- Live pinkpop, holland 1990
- Live Lyon, France 1991
