= Hot Pants (band) =

1980s European rockabilly group

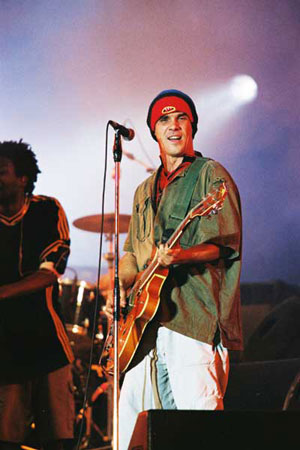
Manu Chao in concert

Hot Pants was an early 1980s European rockabilly group. It was the first band featuring Manu Chao, a French singer-songwriter of Spanish descent, and was heavily influenced by The Clash. In 1984, the group released its first demo "Mala Vida", which went on to become a hit single for Chao's subsequent band, Mano Negra.

As with all of Chao's music, the group had many influences, most notably The Clash, which contributed to their rockabilly sound. The group sang in English and Spanish. Following the 1984 demo tape entitled "Mala Vida," in 1985 they released a 45 with the single "So many nites" (and B-side "Lover Alone"). They released a full-length album entitled Loco Mosquito in 1986, which was re-released in 2000.

The band also involved Chao's cousin, drummer Santi. The members of the group were:

- Manu Chao: guitar/vocals
- Pascal Borgne: guitar
- Jean-Marc: bass guitar
- Santi: drums
