= Mala Vida =

Song by Mano Negra

from the album Patchanka
- Released: 1988
- Genre: French rock; Latin alternative; worldbeat; rock en Español; ska-punk
- Length: 2:53
- Label: Boucherie Productions/Virgin France
- Songwriter(s): Manu Chao
- Producer(s): Mano Negra

"Mala Vida" is the second single by French rock group Mano Negra, appearing on their 1988 debut album Patchanka. Written by lead singer Manu Chao, the song also appeared on a 1984 demo tape of the same name by Hot Pants, a predecessor to Mano Negra. "Mala Vida" was an early hit for Mano Negra and became a staple of the band's live shows and has been covered by several artists. The song has also been performed by Chao as a solo artist; a live performance of the song by Chao was recorded for his 2002 album Radio Bemba Sound System. Boucherie Productions, who published Patchanka, financed a music video for the song, which received airplay on national radio stations and TV channels in France. Mano Negra's success with the release of "Mala Vida" led the band to a contract with Virgin.

== Cover versions ==
Notable cover versions of "Mala Vida" include:

- Yuri Buenaventura, on the 2001 tribute album Mano Negra Illegal
- Café Tacuba, on their 2005 live album Un Viaje (album)
- Gogol Bordello, on their 2005 EP East Infection
- Nouvelle Vague featuring Olivia Ruiz, on their 2010 album Couleurs Sur Paris
- Элизиум (Elisium), on their 2014 album Cover Day
- Belgian pop-punk band Janez Detd.
