= Patchanka =

Studio album by Mano Negra
- Released: 1988
- Genre: French rock
- Length: 38:33
- Labels: Boucherie Productions, Virgin France S.A.
- Producer: Mano Negra

Mano Negra chronology
Patchanka (1988)	Puta's Fever (1989)

Professional ratings
Review scores
Source	Rating
AllMusic	4/5 stars

Patchanka is the debut studio album by Mano Negra, released in 1988. The French edition of Rolling Stone named it the 32nd greatest French rock album (out of 100).

== Track listing ==
No.	Title	Length
1.	"Mano Negra"	1:44
2.	"Ronde de nuit"	2:55
3.	"Baby You're Mine"	2:55
4.	"Indios de Barcelona"	2:34
5.	"Rock Island Line"	3:03
6.	"Noche de Accion"	2:45
7.	"Darling Darling"	1:46
8.	"Killin' Rats"	2:24
9.	"Mala Vida"	2:53
10.	"Takin' It Up"	3:40
11.	"La Ventura"	2:57
12.	"Lonesome Bop"	2:28
13.	"Bragg Jack"	2:32
14.	"Salga La Luna"	3:34

== Charts ==
Chart	Peak position
French Albums (SNEP)	145
