= Manu Chao =

Spanish musician (born 1961)

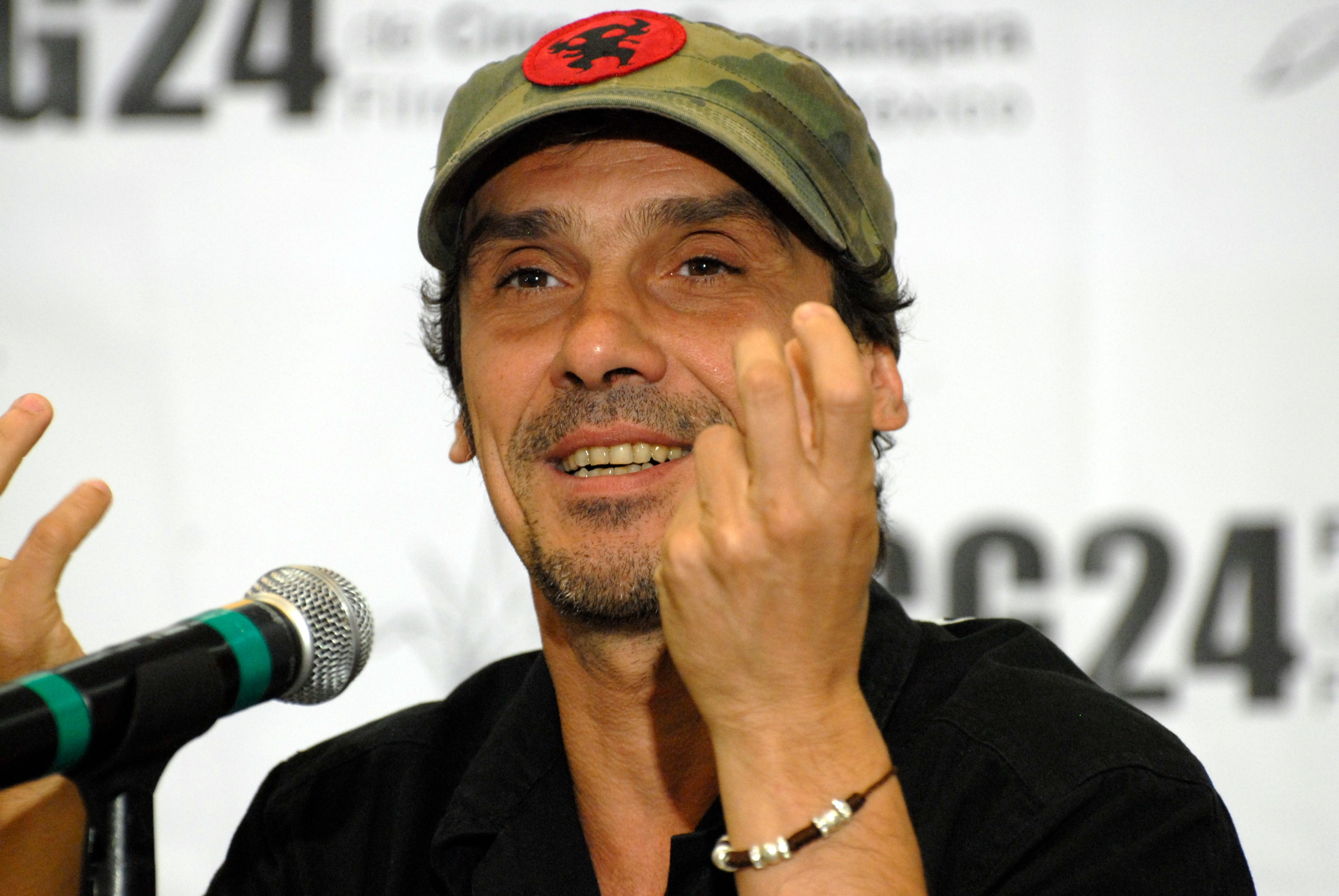
- Manu Chao in 2009
- Born: José Manuel Tomás Arturo Chao Ortega; 21 June 1961 (age 65); Paris, France
- Occupations: Musician; singer; composer; record producer
- Father: Ramón Chao
- Relatives: Antoine Chao (brother)
- Musical career
- Also known as: Oscar Tramor
- Genres: Latin alternative; reggae; worldbeat; ska
- Instruments: Vocals; guitar
- Years active: 1984–present
- Labels: Nacional; Because; Virgin
- Formerly of: Mano Negra
- Website: manuchao.net

Manu Chao (Spanish pronunciation: [ˈmanu ˈtʃao]; born José Manuel Tomás Arturo Chao Ortega on 21 June 1961) is a French-Spanish musician. He sings in French, Spanish, English, Italian, Arabic, Catalan, Galician, Portuguese, Greek and occasionally in other languages. Chao began his musical career in Paris, busking and playing with groups such as Hot Pants and Los Carayos, which combined a variety of languages and musical styles. With friends and his brother Antoine Chao, he founded the band Mano Negra in 1987, achieving considerable success, particularly in Europe. He became a solo artist after its breakup in 1995 and since then has toured regularly with his live band, Radio Bemba Sound System.

== Early life ==
Chao is of Spanish and Spanish-Cuban origins. Chao's mother, Felisa Ortega, is from Bilbao, Basque Country, and his father, writer and journalist Ramón Chao, is from Vilalba, Galicia. They emigrated to Paris to avoid Francisco Franco's dictatorship—Manu's grandfather had been sentenced to death. Shortly after Manu's birth, the Chao family moved to the outskirts of Paris, and Manu spent most of his childhood in Boulogne-Billancourt and Sèvres. As he grew up he was surrounded by many artists and intellectuals, most of whom were acquaintances of his father. Chao cites much of his childhood experience as inspiration for some songs. As a child, he was a big fan of Cuban singer-pianist Bola de Nieve.

== Career ==
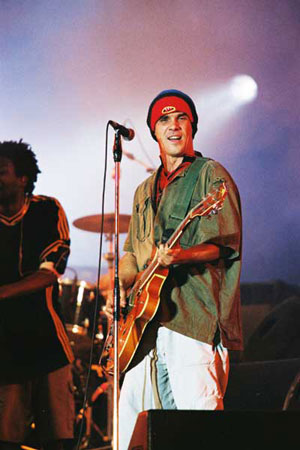
Manu Chao performs live (2001)

=== Early years and Mano Negra (1984–1995) ===
Heavily influenced by the UK rock scene, particularly The Clash and The Jam, and Dr. Feelgood, Chao and other musicians formed the Spanish/English rockabilly group Hot Pants in the mid-1980s. The group released a demo entitled "Mala Vida" in 1984, which received plenty of local critical praise but otherwise gained them little attention. By the time the group released their first album in 1986 the Parisian alternative music scene had taken flight, and Manu, his brother Antoine Chao, and friends such as Alain from Les Wampas formed Los Carayos to incorporate this sound with the rockabilly and punk styles of Hot Pants. Los Carayos remained a side project of the artists for eight years, releasing three albums in the first two years followed by a final album in 1994.

In 1987, the Chao brothers and their cousin Santiago Casariego founded the band Mano Negra. Manu Chao said in Alt.Latino in 2011,

"Mano Negra started playing in a subway in Paris before the band started to be known and selling records. We started in a subway for a living. This is what made the musicians of Mano Negra. And so the people using the subway in Paris was very eclectic. There were people from a lot of different countries, different cultures. So we have to be able to play all kinds of music to please all the people in a subway. So that was a perfect school to learn a lot of different styles of music."

Starting on a smaller label, the group released a reworked version of the Hot Pants single "Mala Vida" in 1988, which quickly became a hit in France. The group soon moved to Virgin Records, and their first album Patchanka was released the following year. Though the group never gained much fame in the English-speaking market, popularity throughout the rest of the world soon followed, reaching the Top 5 in the Netherlands, Italy, and Germany. The band achieved some fame in South America with 1992's Cargo Tour, where it played a series of shows in port cities, performing from a stage built into their tour ship's hold. Mano Negra also performed a tour through much of Colombia in a retired train, the "Ice Express". Still, rifts began to grow among band members during the port tour and the following year's train tour; many band members, including Manu's brother Antoine, had left the group by the end of 1994. Following that year's release of their final album, Casa Babylon, Manu Chao moved the band to Madrid, but legal problems with former bandmates led Chao to disband the group in 1995.

Mano Negra's sound is mostly characterized by energetic, lively rhythms, symbolized by the title of their first album, Patchanka, derived from the word pachanga (which is a colloquial term for "party"), and a distinct informality which allows the audience to get involved and feel close to their sound. Mixed music genres are present throughout their albums. Manu Chao is friends with Gogol Bordello and that group has covered Mano Negra's song "Mala Vida" on their own and with Chao beginning in 2006.

=== Solo years with Radio Bemba (1995–present) ===
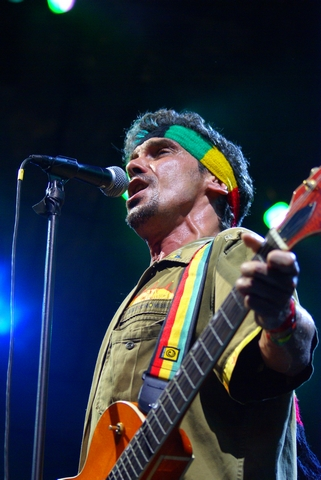
Manu Chao in Prospect Park, Brooklyn, June 2007

After arriving in Madrid, Chao and other bandmates from Mano Negra formed a new group, Radio Bemba Sound System (named for the communication system used in the Sierra Maestra by the Castro-and-Guevara-led rebels in the Cuban Revolution), featuring groups from diverse backgrounds, such as Mexican Tijuana No!, Brazilian Skank, and Argentinian Todos Tus Muertos. The goal was to replicate the sound of street music and bar scenes from a variety of cultures; to that end, Chao and the group spent several years travelling throughout South and Central America, recording new music as they went. The resulting music differed drastically from Mano Negra; the songs were primarily sung in Spanish with far fewer French tracks and the musical style had shifted from punk and alternative styles to the street vibe Chao was aiming for. The songs were collectively released as Clandestino in 1998, under Manu Chao's own name. Though not an instant success, the album gained a steady following in France with hits such as "Bongo Bong" and "Clandestino", and the album eventually earned the Best World Music Album award in 1999's Victoires de la Musique awards. It sold in excess of 5 million copies.

Chao's second album with Radio Bemba Sound System, Próxima Estación: Esperanza, was released in 2001. This album, named after a Madrid metro station stop (the title translates to Next Station: Hope), features similar sounds to Clandestino but with heavier Caribbean influences than the previous album. The album was an instant hit, and its single "Me Gustas Tú" became the most successful song of Chao's career, reaching number one in several European and Latin American countries; as of 2024, it had accumulated more than 300 million plays on YouTube. The tour that followed resulted in the 2002 live album Radio Bemba Sound System. Two years later, Chao returned to his French roots with the French-only album Sibérie m'était contéee, which included a large book featuring lyrics to the album and illustrations by Jacek Woźniak.

Chao's next album La Radiolina (literally "little radio" in Italian, but also "pocket radio") was released on 17 September 2007. This was the first international release since 2001's Próxima Estación: Esperanza. "Rainin in Paradize" was the first single from the album, available for download on his website before the release of the album. Concert reviews indicate that music from La Radiolina was already being performed live as early as April 2007's Coachella show.

Chao's most recent album, Viva Tu, was released on September 20, 2024. It was preceded by videos for two songs, "Viva Tu" and "Sao Paulo Motoboy", released May 29, 2024 and June 26, 2024, respectively.

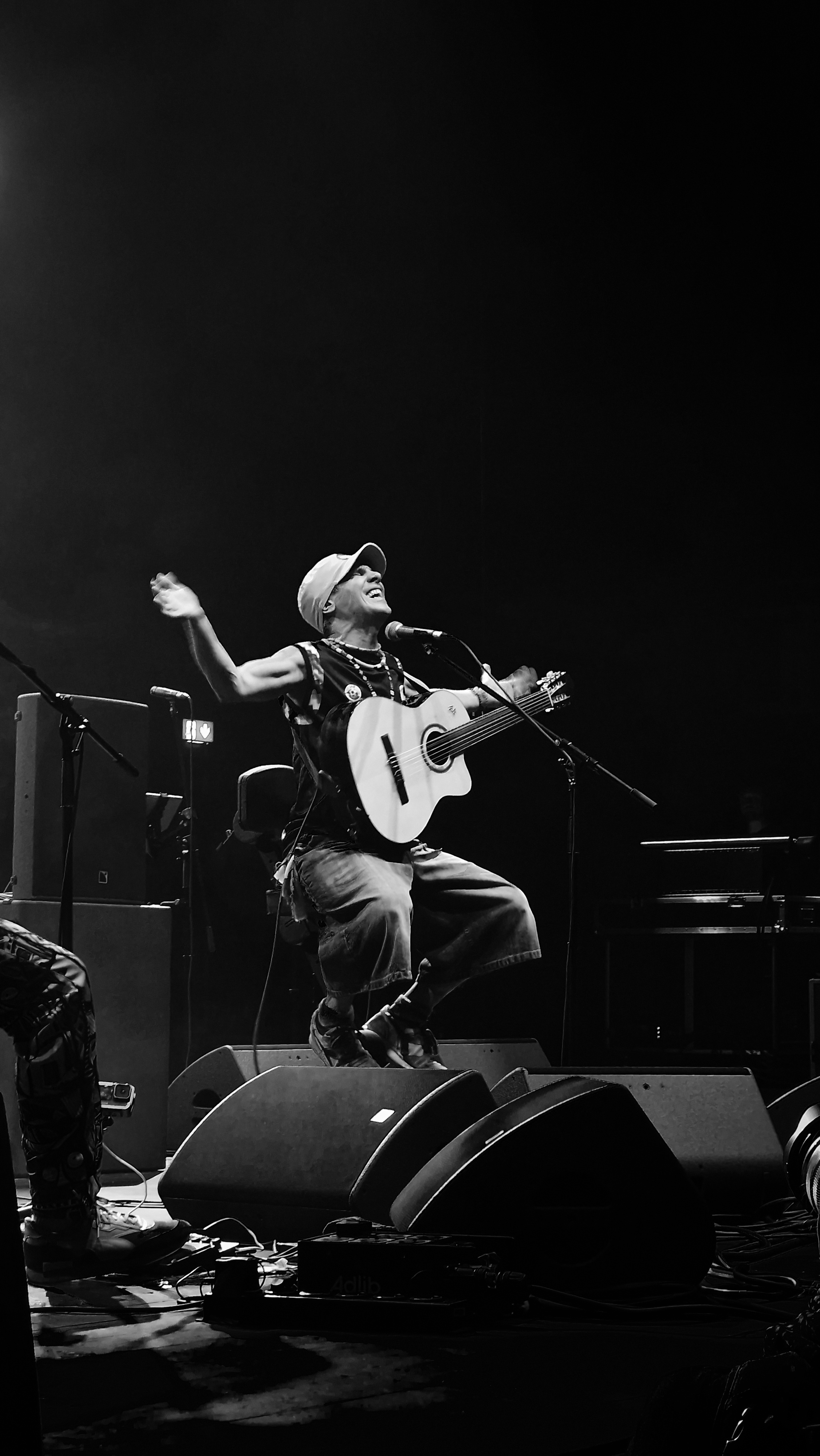
Manu Chao at the O2 Academy Brixton, London, 22 September 2024

=== Other works ===
In 2003, he approached Amadou & Mariam and later produced their 2004 album Dimanche à Bamako ("Sunday in Bamako"). His song "Me llaman Calle", written for the 2005 Spanish film Princesas, won a Goya Award for Best Original Song. The song was later included on 2007's La Radiolina. Vocals from the song are included in the Go Lem System song "Calle Go Lem". Time magazine named "Me Llaman Calle" one of The 10 Best Songs of 2007, ranking it at No. 8. Writer Josh Tyrangiel observed:

Chao's warm singing over José Manuel Gamboa and Carlos Herrero's leaping Flamenco counter melody creates a direct emotional line to the core of this mid-tempo ballad. With its easy melody and universal rhythm Me Llaman Calle walks proudly in the shadow of Bob Marley, the last guy who made world music this disarmingly simple.

Manu Chao was featured on the album True Love by Toots and the Maytals, which won the Grammy Award in 2004 for Best Reggae Album, and showcased many notable musicians including Willie Nelson, Eric Clapton, Jeff Beck, Trey Anastasio, Gwen Stefani / No Doubt, Ben Harper, Bonnie Raitt, The Roots, Ryan Adams, Keith Richards, Toots Hibbert, Paul Douglas, Jackie Jackson, Ken Boothe, and The Skatalites.

His song "La Vida Tómbola" was featured in the documentary film Maradona by Serbian filmmaker Emir Kusturica. The song "La Trampa", recorded with Tonino Carotone for the compilation album Fuerza! was used as the theme song for the short-lived improvisational comedy Drew Carey's Green Screen Show.

The songs "Bongo Bong" and "Je ne t'aime plus", which appear back-to-back on Clandestino, were covered by British singers Robbie Williams and Lily Allen, who recorded them as a single track, "Bongo Bong and Je Ne T'aime Plus" and released it as a single from the album Rudebox.

In 2025, Chao was featured on Italian singer Alfa's single "A me mi piace", released on May 9, 2025, whose chorus reprises the melody and part of the lyrics of "Me Gustas Tú". The song topped the Italian FIMI singles chart.

== Musical style and influences ==
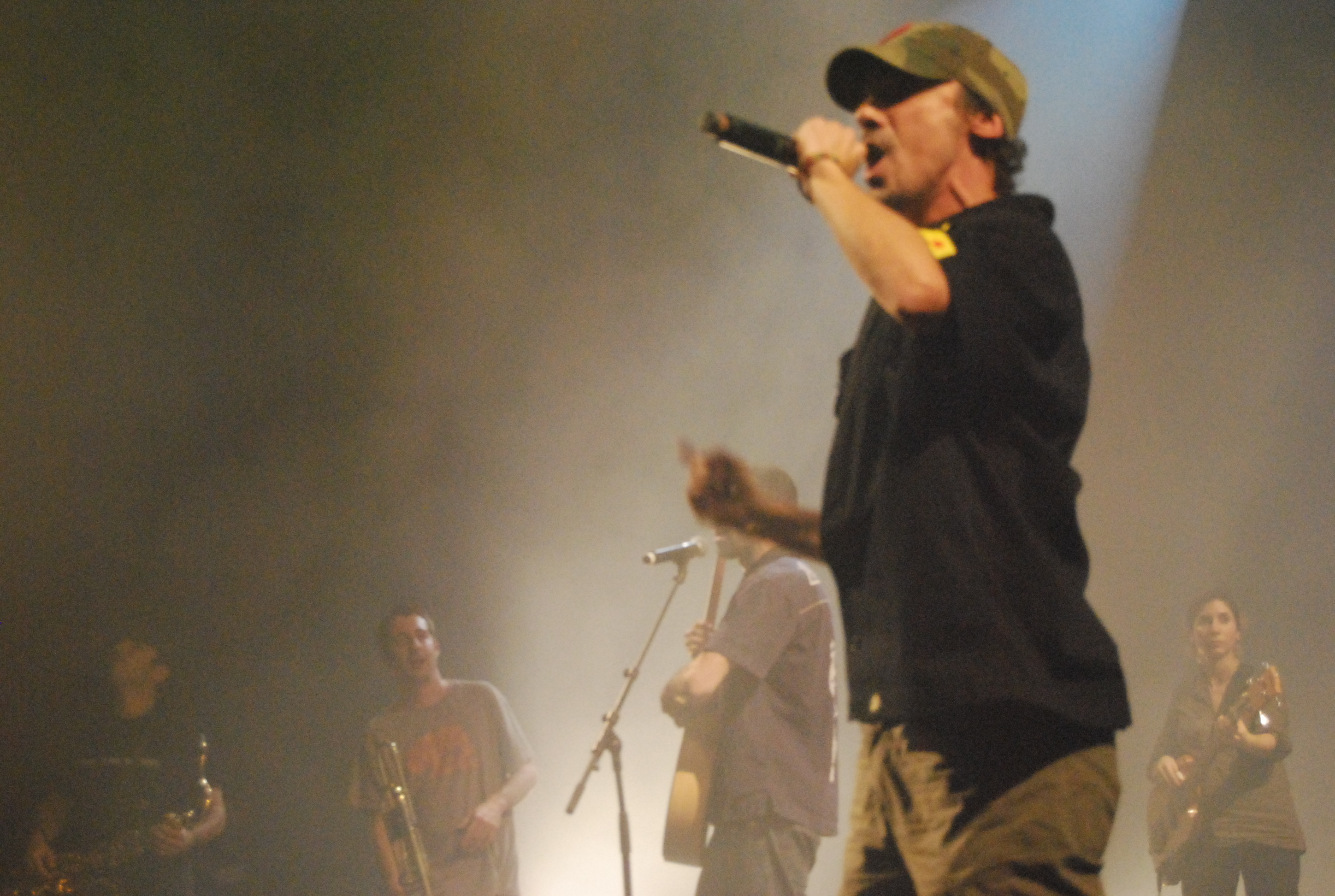
Manu Chao performs in Paris (2008)

Manu Chao sings in Spanish, French, Italian, English, Portuguese, Galician, Arabic and Wolof, often mixing several languages in the same song. His music has many influences, such as punk, rock, French chanson, Iberoamerican salsa, reggae, ska, and Algerian raï. These influences were obtained from immigrants in France, his Iberian connections, and foremost his travels in Mesoamerica as a nomad following the disbanding of Mano Negra. While Mano Negra called their style patchanka (literally "patchwork"), Manu Chao speaks of música mestiza (de:Mestizo-Musik), a musical style which may also incorporate elements of rap, flamenco, Afro-Cuban music, samba and cumbia.

In many of his pieces he layers lyrics, music, and sound recordings over each other. In the short documentary film Infinita tristeza (essentially a video travelogue of Chao's 2001 tour of South America), included within the bonus section of his 2002 live DVD release Babylonia en Guagua, Chao explained that his only recording tool is a small IBM ThinkPad laptop computer, which he carries with him wherever he goes; he has occasionally used conventional recording studios, such as Europa Sonor in Paris, to overdub instruments such as drums, electric guitars and brass, but the vast majority of his material (including all sorts of spoken-word samples from radio stations, TV, films, old vinyl records and, on Próxima Estación: Esperanza, announcements from the Madrid Metro) has been recorded by Chao himself exclusively on his laptop. The Spanish credit Grabado en el Estudio Clandestino ("Recorded in Studio Clandestino/Clandestine Studio"), which appears on all of his solo album starting from 1998's Clandestino, actually refers to the laptop.

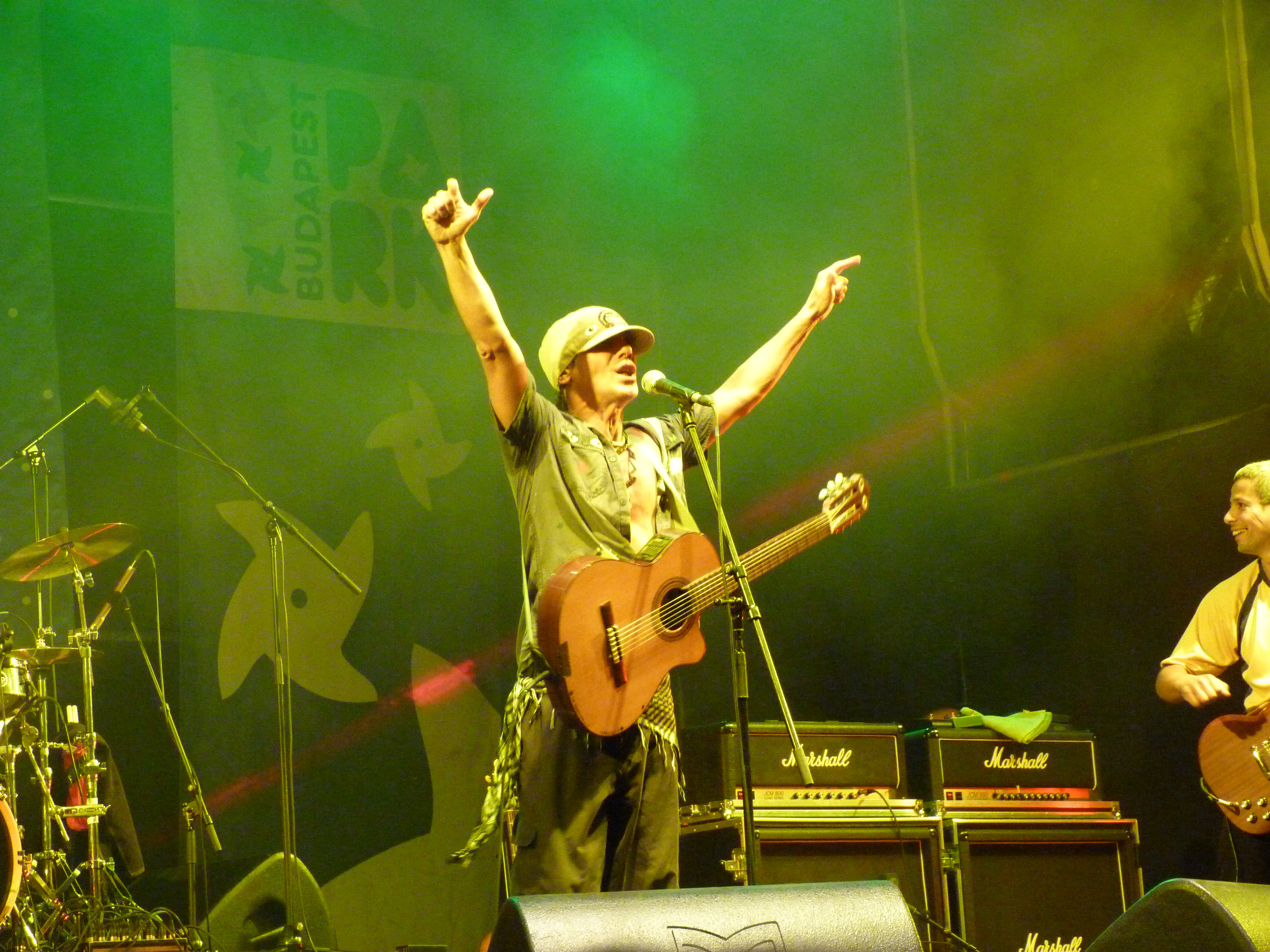
Manu at Budapest Park, 2013

Chao also has a tendency to reuse music or lyrics from previous songs to form new songs. The contemporary hit single in France "Bongo Bong", takes its lyrics from the earlier Mano Negra hit "King of Bongo", which bears a similar style to that of The Clash. The musical backdrop for "Bongo Bong", in turn, was used in several other Chao songs, including "Je Ne T'Aime Plus" from the same album and "Mr. Bobby" and "Homens" from Próxima Estación: Esperanza. (According to a statement by Chao himself in the Próxima Estación CD booklet, "Homens" is the song which the backdrop was originally written and recorded for, and all the others came later.) Also, the tune of "La Primavera", a track from that same album, is used in several other songs featured on the LP, while lyrics for a few songs on Sibérie m'était contéee are repeated several times with different music, leading the lyrics to be interpreted in various ways depending on the mood of the track. Several musical themes and clips from that album also appear on Amadou & Mariam's Chao-produced Dimanche à Bamako, which were being produced at approximately the same time.

Though his live performances in the U.S. are infrequent, Chao played a handful of dates there in 2006, including a headlining show at Lollapalooza 2006 in Chicago. He was one of the headlining acts at the 2008 Austin City Limits Music Festival and the Outside Lands Music Festival in Golden Gate Park. In January 2012 he was the headline act at the opening night of Sydney Festival, marking his first concert in Australia.

== Political views and activism ==
Chao believes that our world lacks spaces for "collective therapy" and describes his concerts as small temporary spaces where people of different backgrounds can come together.

Chao's lyrics provoke his audience to think about immigration, love, living in ghettos, drugs, and often carry a left-wing message. This reflects Chao's own political leanings—he is very close to the Zapatistas and their public spokesman, Subcomandante Marcos. He has many followers among the European left, the Latin American left, the anti-globalisation, and anti-capitalist movements. Chao is a founding member of ATTAC. Punk and reggae historian Vivien Goldman commented of his work, "I was writing about Good Charlotte and The Police. They adopted the trappings of punk. They aren't bad groups, but the punk aspect is more manifested by somebody like Manu Chao. He's one of the punkiest artists out there I can think of. It's an inclusionary spirit that is punk."

Since 1991, Chao has been working with La Colifata, which is an NGO made up of a group of patients and ex patients of Hospital Borda, a psychiatric hospital in Buenos Aires, Argentina. Chao uses both a website and a Facebook account to show the work he does with these patients and ex patients. On their Facebook page, he explains that the mission of this group is to diminish the stigma that people place on mental illness and to promote the use of services that are meant to help those with mental illnesses.

=== Interview with the University of Southern California (2010) ===
In an interview with the School for Communication and Journalism at the University of Southern California in 2010, Chao expressed his opinions about topics such as the effects of economic globalization on social inequality. He explained how he believes that the global market is causing social inequality, and how issues in education and immigration are connected to this. In this interview, he expressed a worry that mafias are the greatest threat to democracy and that this is already evident in certain places, like Russia and Mexico. He stated that this is one reason that he is for the legalization of drugs such as marijuana - he explained that mafias are making capital off of the distribution of illegal drugs which gives them more economic power, thus making it easier for them to potentially overthrow governments.

In this interview he also expressed his belief that currently, the global market is the largest force shaping the lives of people throughout the world. For this reason, he believes that the most effective way to solve social problems in individual countries is to address them at a global level by changing the policies dictating the global market. He explained that since most people are not given the power to directly change these policies, the most effective way to bring about change would be to make a statement to those running the economy by becoming self-sufficient through boycotting corporations, growing one's own vegetables, and making one's own clothes.

He then added that he does not own a car or cell phone because he does not need either of these. He also talked about having weak leaders as a threat to democracy and explained that there are small movements in Spain that are fighting for blank votes to be recorded as legitimate votes. He explained this could be a solution because blank votes currently make up a majority of the votes in elections, which means that election results are inaccurate.

Chao also discussed education during this interview. He expressed his belief that education is important and should be free for everyone. He mentioned that Cuba is able to provide free education for all those living in Cuba despite being a small country and that he does not understand how the United States being such a powerful nation was not able to do the same. He then expressed frustration at the fact that one can enroll in the armed forces in the United States and "learn to kill" for free, but had to pay to learn to do anything else. He suggested that this is a sign that the United States is afraid of its future.

When asked about immigration during this interview, Chao mentioned that the West, particularly the United States, has a population with a lot of elderly people and that in order to excel in the future, the West needs the youth from "Third World" countries. He explains that providing legal status to immigrant young people would require the United States to honor the rights of these immigrants, and therefore it is cheaper and easier for the United States to deny so many young immigrants a legal status. He then said that the "Occident...needs to open the borders."

=== Mentioned in The Journal of Natural and Social Philosophy ===
In an article published in 2010, Cornelia Gräbner mentioned Chao's lyrics in a discussion about how the work of four different authors who contribute to the alter-globalization movement. Gräbner discusses how Manu Chao, Eduardo Galeano, Subcomandante Marcos, and José Saramago present alternative practice of politics from different perspectives. Gräbner states that Chao's work emphasizes the connection of contemporary 'contentious Europe' with past struggles, particularly through his lyrics and combinations of musical styles. Gräbner believes that Chao's family history plays a crucial role in his political views and how that has shaped the way he creates his music. She explains that "Chao translates his family's anti-fascist political tradition into a politicized embrace of cultural difference and into a clear anti-racist and anticapitalist stance." She also states that Chao continues to use these messages in his music even after the dissolution of Mano Negra.

== Discography ==
"Mr. Bobby"
A 23 second sample of "Mr. Bobby", the last single from Próxima Estación: Esperanza. The song uses samples from diverse sources and several instruments layered on top of each other.

- Clandestino (1998)
- Próxima Estación: Esperanza (2001)
- Sibérie m'était contéee (2004)
- La Radiolina (2007)
- Viva Tu (2024)

== Awards and nominations ==
Award	Year	Nominated work	Category	Result	Ref.
Goya Awards	2006	"Me Llaman Calle"	Best Original Song	Won	
Grammy Awards	2002	Próxima Estación: Esperanza	Best Latin Rock or Alternative Album	Nominated	
Latin Grammy Awards	2007	"Me Llaman Calle"	Best Alternative Song	Won	
Latin Grammy Awards	2008	La Radiolina	Best Alternative Music Album	Nominated	
Latin Grammy Awards	2008	"Me Llaman Calle"	Best Short Form Music Video	Nominated	
MTV Europe Music Awards	2001	Himself	Best French Act	Won	
