= Manu Chao discography =

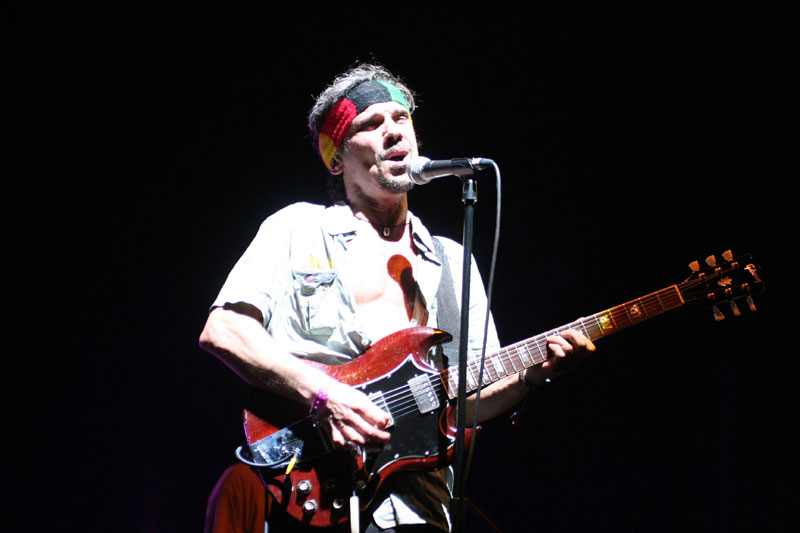
- Manu Chao at the 2007 Coachella Valley Music and Arts Festival
- Studio albums: 4
- Live albums: 2
- Singles: 6

Manu Chao is a French-Spanish singer and guitarist. This is a list of official releases by Chao as a solo artist with his backing band Radio Bemba Sound System.

== Studio albums ==
List of albums, with selected chart positions
Title	Album details	Peak chart positions										Sales	Certifications
Title	Album details	FRA	BEL (Fl)	BEL (Wa)	GER	ITA	MEX	SPA	SWI	UK	US	Sales	Certifications
Clandestino	Released: 6 October 1998; Label: Virgin; Format: CD	1	20	20	14	20	—	80	9	—	—	FRA: 1,500,000; ITA: 300,000; WW: 3,000,000	SNEP: Diamond; BRMA: 2× Platinum; BPI: Gold; BVMI: Gold; FIMI: Platinum; IFPI SWI: 2× Platinum; PROMUSICAE: Platinum
Próxima Estación: Esperanza	Released: 5 June 2001; Label: Virgin; Format: CD	1	3	1	4	1	—	1	1	—	— (Note: Próxima Estación: Esperanza did not enter the Billboard 200, but it peaked at number 8 on Billboard Top Latin Albums and number 10 on Billboard's World Albums chart.)	WW: 3,000,000	SNEP: 3× Platinum; BRMA: Platinum; BPI: Silver; IFPI SWI: 3× Platinum; PROMUSICAE: 2× Platinum; RIAA: Platinum (Latin)
Sibérie m'était contéee	Released: 2004; Label: Virgin; Format: CD	32	—	—	—	—	—	—	—	—	—		
La Radiolina	Released: 4 September 2007; Label: Nacional/Because Music; Format: CD	2	1	2	5	2	10	1	1	41	71	FRA: 400,000; US: 111,000; WW: 1,000,000	BRMA: Gold; IFPI SWI: Platinum; RIAA: Gold (Latin)
Viva Tu	Released: 20 September 2024; Label: Because Music; Format: CD	4	36	8	29	54	—	—	6	—	—		
"—" denotes a recording that did not chart or was not released in that territory.

== Live albums ==
Title	Album details	Peak chart positions									Sales	Certifications
Title	Album details	FRA	BEL (Fl)	BEL (Wa)	GER	ITA	MEX	SPA	SWI	US World	Sales	Certifications
Radio Bemba Sound System	Released: 17 September 2002; Label: Virgin; Format: CD	3	10	1	32	13	66	—	2	3		SNEP: 2× Gold; BRMA: Gold; IFPI SWI: Gold; PROMUSICAE: Gold
Baionarena	Released: 2009; Label: Virgin; Format: CD	5	17	12	36	63	99	36	17	11	Europe: 150,000	
"—" denotes a recording that did not chart or was not released in that territory.

== Singles ==
=== As lead artist ===
List of singles, with selected chart positions
Title	Year	Peak chart positions										Certifications	Album
Title	Year	FRA	AUT	BEL (Fl)	BEL (Wa)	GER	ITA	NLD	SPA	SWE	SWI	Certifications	Album
"Bongo Bong" (feat. Anouk Khelifa)	1999/ 2000	40	4	—	—	7	5	42	—	45	15	BVMI: Gold; FIMI: Platinum; PROMUSICAE: Gold	Clandestino
"Clandestino"	2000	196	—	—	—	—	—	—	—	—	—	FIMI: Gold	Clandestino
"Merry Blues"	2001	—	—	—	—	—	—	—	—	—	90		Próxima Estación: Esperanza
"Me Gustas Tú"	2001	2	29	11	8	—	1	35	1	51	11	SNEP: Gold; BRMA: Gold; FIMI: Platinum; PROMUSICAE: Platinum	Próxima Estación: Esperanza
"Mr. Bobby"	2002	86	—	—	—	—	16	—	15	—	60		Próxima Estación: Esperanza
"Rainin In Paradize"	2007	—	—	—	—	—	—	—	—	—	39		La Radiolina
"La Vida Tómbola"	2008	—	—	—	—	—	—	—	—	—	72		La Radiolina
"—" denotes a recording that did not chart or was not released in that territory.

=== As featured artist ===
List of singles, with selected chart positions
Title	Year	Peak chart positions										Certifications	Album
Title	Year	FRA	BLR Air.	CIS Air.	ITA	KAZ Air.	LAT Air.	LTU Air.	MDA Air.	RUS Air.	UKR Air.	Certifications	Album
"Sénégal Fast Food" (Amadou & Mariam featuring Manu Chao)	2005	28	*	—	—	*				—	—		Dimanche à Bamako
"Leave Me Alone" (Calypso Rose featuring Manu Chao)	2016	163	*	—	—	*	—	—	*	—	—		Far from Home
"A me mi piace" (Alfa featuring Manu Chao)	2025	162	5	2	1	7	6	25	23	1	74	FIMI: 2× Platinum	Non so chi ha creato il mondo ma so che era innamorato
"—" denotes a recording that did not chart or was not released in that territory. "*" denotes the chart did not exist at that time.
