= Clandestino (disambiguation) =

Clandestino(s) may also refer to:

== Music and entertainment ==
- "Clandestino" (Manu Chao song), 1998
- "Clandestino" (Shakira and Maluma song), 2018
- "Clandestino", a 2014 song by Francesco Gabbani from Greitist Iz
- Clandestino is a 1998 album by Manu Chao
- Clandestino, a 2016 album by Lartiste
- Clandestino, a 2010 album by Roser
- Clandestino, a character on The Bluffers
- Clandestinos (1987 film), a 1987 Cuban film directed by Fernando Pérez
- Clandestinos (2007 film), a 2007 Spanish film directed by Antonio Hens

== Other uses ==
- Clandestino, a clandestine operative of Fretilin or Falintil during the Indonesian occupation of East Timor

== See also ==
- Clandestine (disambiguation)
