= Madjid Fahem =

French guitarist

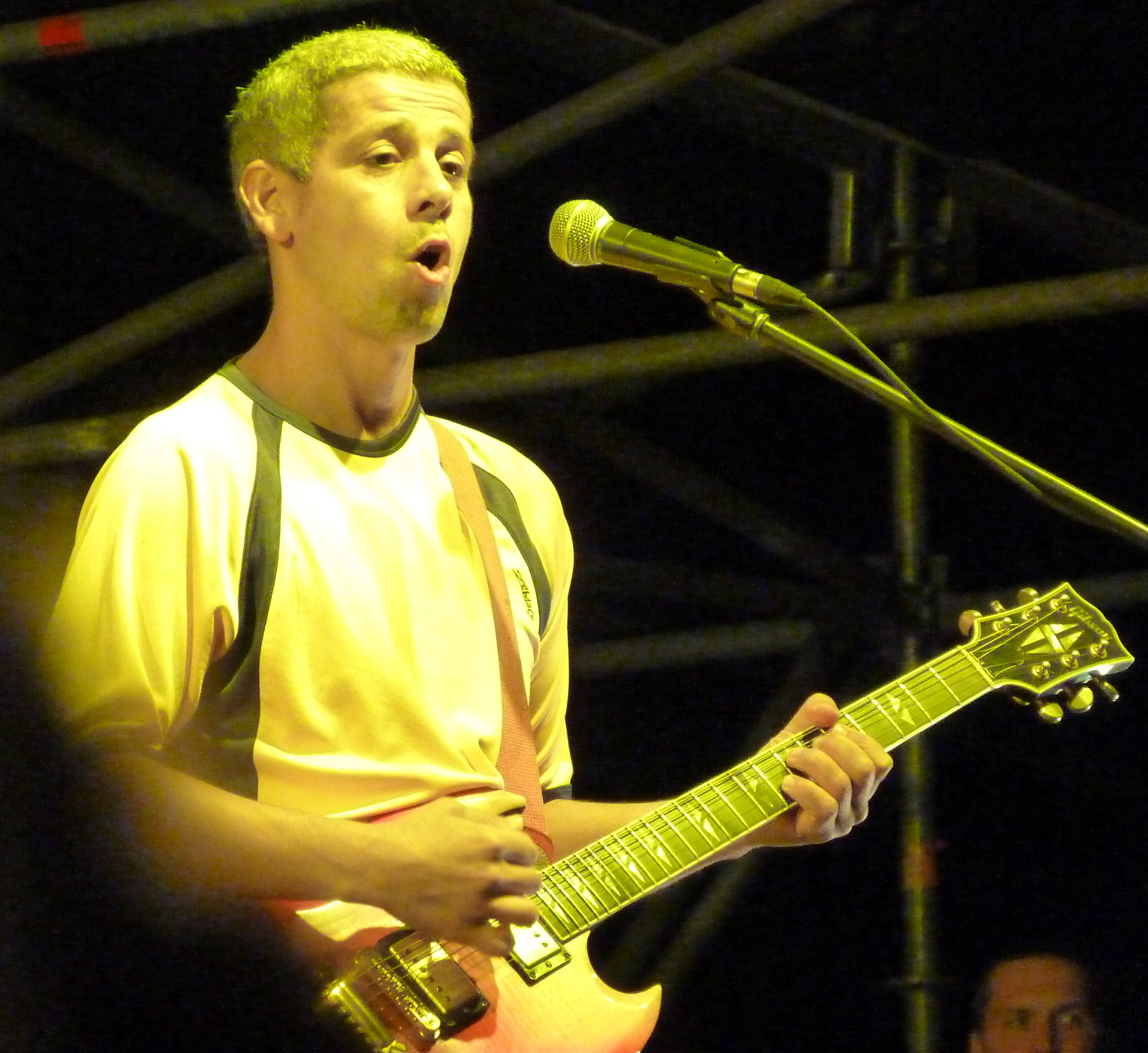
- Fahem performing in 2013

Background information
- Birth name: Madjid Fahem
- Born: 1973; Mantes-la-Jolie, Paris, France
- Genres: Rock, flamenco, rumba
- Occupation: Musician
- Instrument(s): Vocals guitar keyboard
- Years active: 2000–present
- Labels: Virgin Records, Because Music

Madjid Fahem is a French guitarist born in Paris in 1973. He has been a member of Manu Chao’s band Radio Bemba Sound System since 2000.

He was born in the suburbs of Paris to Algerian parents, where he began playing guitar at the age of 16, when he began playing with his uncles. His musical role models include Django Reinhardt and Paco de Lucía, while Dire Straits and Eric Clapton influenced him in the early stages of his musical development.

Fahem initially played with various local bands before joining the band La Kinky Beat. He joined Manu Chao’s backing band Radio Bemba Sound System in 2000, participating in the recording of Chao's second solo album Clandestino.

He is known for his soloing skills, including a live version of "Clandestino". He plays a Gibson SG for electric tracks, and a classical guitar for songs that sound rumba or traditional.

Fahem was involved in the development of Manu Chao's latest album, La Radiolina, in 2007. In addition to Chao, Fahem has collaborated with over 15 other artists on various recordings.

Manu Chao admires Fahem's work, describing Fahem in an interview "a monster, one of the best guitarists in the world".

== Discography ==
- 2002: Radio Bemba Sound System
- 2004: Sibérie m'était contéee
- 2004: Made in Barna
- 2007: La Radiolina
- 2008: Asthmatic Lion Sound Systema
- 2008: I Come From
- 2009: Baionarena
- 2009: L'hiver Est Là
- 2009: Tudo é possible
- 2013: Santalegria
- 2016: Black Is Beltza ASM Sessions – Irun Lion Zion in Dub (Vol II)
