= Viva Tu =

Studio album by Manu Chao
- Released: 20 September 2024
- Length: 38:19
- Language: English; French; Portuguese; Spanish
- Label: Because
- Producer: Manu Chao

Manu Chao chronology
Baionarena (2008)	Viva Tu (2024)

Singles from Viva Tu
- 1. "Viva Tu" Released: 29 May 2024; 2. "São Paulo Motoboy" Released: 26 June 2024; 3. "Tu Te Vas" Released: 28 August 2024

Viva Tu is the fifth studio album by the French-Spanish singer Manu Chao, released on 20 September 2024 through Because Music. It was Chao's first studio release since 2007's La Radiolina seventeen years prior, as he opted to collaborate with other artists. Produced entirely by Chao, the album features guest appearances from Willie Nelson and Laeti.

== Background ==
After the release of his 2007 album La Radiolina, Manu Chao seemingly disappeared from the public eye, leading many to believe he had gone on hiatus. However, he hardly remained inactive at all. Instead, Chao chose to embrace a simpler, more introspective lifestyle. He traveled with a small group of friends, adopting a minimalist approach to life, focusing on the essentials and maintaining a "pure heart" free of pretension. He also collaborated with various artists, contributing to projects with Bomba Estéreo, Rumbakana, Chalart58, Carlangas, Dani Lança, and Calypso Rose, among others. It wasn't until Chao decided to release "Viva Tu" as a single on 29 May 2024, with no prior announcement, ultimately breaking the silence.

== Critical reception ==
Professional ratings
Aggregate scores
Source	Rating
Metacritic	81/100
Review scores
Source	Rating
AllMusic	4/5 stars
Financial Times	3/5 stars
Mojo	4/5 stars
PopMatters	8/10
Rolling Stone	3.5/5 stars
Uncut	4/5 stars

Viva Tu was met with widespread acclaim from music critics. At Metacritic, which assigns a normalized rating out of 100 to reviews from professional publications, the album received an average score of 81, based on 5 reviews.

The critical reception of Manu Chao's Viva Tu highlights both its strengths and its limitations. David Honigmann of the Financial Times notes that while the album is "a more original set than La Radiolina," it still suffers from the "recycling" of familiar ideas, suggesting a lack of newness compared to Chao's earlier works. Similarly, Mariano Prunes of AllMusic acknowledges that the album sticks to the same formula, but praises its "warm and engaging" songs that sound "positively inspired and refreshing," offering a welcome return for Chao. Luis Aguisvivas from PopMatters sees the album as an "art of feeling," highlighting the emotional depth of its "simplistic composition," which he feels is its strongest suit. Meanwhile, Jon Dolan of Rolling Stone offered a more mixed view, calling it "a satisfying continuation of his artistic journey," but noting that it lacks the same impact and excitement as Clandestino and Próxima Estación: Esperanza though "has a little more of a singer-songwriter quality than its predecessors."

== Track listing ==
All tracks are written by Manu Chao except where noted. All tracks composed by Manu Chao.

Viva Tu track listing
No.	Title	Writer(s)	Length
1.	"Vecinos En El Mar"		2:37
2.	"La Couleur du Temps"		2:08
3.	"River Why"		3:16
4.	"Viva Tu"		3:08
5.	"Heaven's Bad Day" (featuring Willie Nelson)		2:05
6.	"Tu Te Vas" (featuring Laeti)	Manu Chao, Laetitia Kerfa	3:25
7.	"Coraçao No Mar"		2:37
8.	"Cuatro Calles"		4:20
9.	"La Colilla"		2:34
10.	"São Paulo Motoboy"		2:28
11.	"Tom et Lola"		2:44
12.	"Lonely Night"		2:34
13.	"Tantas Tierras"		4:23
Total length:			38:19

== Charts ==
Chart performance for Viva Tu
Chart (2024)	Peak position
Austrian Albums (Ö3 Austria)	5
Belgian Albums (Ultratop Flanders)	36
Belgian Albums (Ultratop Wallonia)	8
Dutch Albums (Album Top 100)	100
French Albums (SNEP)	4
German Albums (Offizielle Top 100)	29
Italian Albums (FIMI)	54
Portuguese Albums (AFP)	36
Spanish Albums (Promusicae)	22
Swiss Albums (Schweizer Hitparade)	6
