= La Radiolina =

Studio album by Manu Chao
- Released: 30 August 2007
- Genres: Latin alternative, rock
- Label: Because
- Producer: Manu Chao

Manu Chao chronology
Sibérie m'était contéee (2004)	La Radiolina (2007)	Viva Tu (2024)

Singles from La Radiolina
- 1. "Rainin in Paradize" Released: 2007; 2. "La Vida Tómbola" Released: 2008

Professional ratings
Review scores
Source	Rating
AllMusic	link
Entertainment Weekly	A− link
The Guardian	link
LA Times	link
The Observer	link
The Onion	A− link
Pitchfork	7.5/10 6Sep2007
Q	link
Rolling Stone	link
Uncut	link

La Radiolina is the fourth studio album by Manu Chao. It was released on 4 September 2007. Italy saw an advance release of the album on 30 August.

"Rainin in Paradize", the first single from the album, was available before its official release for download on his website. The single features a music video directed by Serbian filmmaker Emir Kusturica. There is also a video for the song "Me Llaman Calle", featuring Manu Chao performing in a local bar.

== Languages and style ==
The album's title La Radiolina means the small radio in Italian, referring to a small-sized transistor radio. The album is mainly sung in Spanish. "Politik Kills", "Rainin In Paradize", "The Bleedin Clown" and the first two lines of "Siberia" are in English; "Besoin de la Lune" and "Panik Panik" are in French; "A Cosa" is in Italian, a first for Manu Chao; "Amalucada Vida" is in Brazilian Portuguese.

Musically, the album features a trademark of Manu Chao's style in its re-utilizing of the same instrumental backing tracks with different melodies and lyrics:

- "Rainin In Paradize", "El Kitapena", "Siberia" and "Mama Cuchara" all feature the same backing track, which is slightly heavier and rockier than the usual Manu Chao output, with distorted guitars played by Madjid Fahem.
- "El Hoyo" and "Panik Panik" are similar in style to the above song, but the chords are slightly different.
- Other tracks on the album are just coupled by using the same music: "13 Días" and "Besoin de la Lune"; "Politik Kills" and "Mundorévès"; "A Cosa" and "Amalucada Vida"; "The Bleedin Clown" and "Y Ahora Qué?", which at the same time have the same lead guitar melody as "Tristeza Maleza", but on a different chord.
- "Piccola Radiolina" is an edited instrumental version of "Mala Fama".
- "Soñé Otro Mundo" is a short instrumental excerpt from "Otro Mundo".
- "Me Llaman Calle" and "La Vida Tómbola" feature the same chords and the same accompaniment pattern, although the music is not exactly identical.

A similar "recycling" process also affects some of the lyrics. "Tristeza Maleza" features the repeated phrase "Infinita Tristeza", from the album Próxima Estación: Esperanza; the lyrics for "Besoin de la Lune" originally appeared with different music, and in a slightly longer version, on the album Sibérie m'était contéee; that same album also included the original French lyrics of "Sibérie" (again with different music), which Chao partly translated in "Siberia"; the lyrics for "Mama Cuchara" were originally written in Quito, Ecuador, during a rainy Sunday, and originally appeared, with different music, in Chao's short film "Infinita Tristeza", included in the Kikelandia bonus section of the 2002 Babylonia en Guagua DVD (that performance was never officially released). Additionally, "13 Días" and "Otro Mundo" contain phrases appearing several times in Chao's previous output, such as "Me hielo en la habitación / No tengo calefacción" in "13 Días" and "Calavera no llora / Serenata de amor" in "Otro Mundo". The lyrics to the tracks "Panik Panik" and "Politik Kills" are the same as those in the tracks "Camions Sauvages" and "Politic Amagni" respectively on Amadou & Mariam's album Dimanche à Bamako which was produced by Manu Chao.

== Track listing ==
1. "13 Días"
2. "Tristeza Maleza"
3. "Politik Kills"
4. "Rainin in Paradize (Scheps version)"
5. "Besoin de la Lune"
6. "El Kitapena"
7. "Me Llaman Calle"
8. "A Cosa"
9. "The Bleedin Clown (Scheps version)"
10. "Mundorévès"
11. "El Hoyo"
12. "La Vida Tómbola"
13. "Mala Fama"
14. "Panik Panik"
15. "Otro Mundo"
16. "Piccola Radiolina"
17. "Y Ahora Qué?"
18. "Mama Cuchara"
19. "Siberia"
20. "Soñe Otro Mundo"
21. "Amalucada Vida"

== Personnel/credits ==
- Manu Chao – vocals and guitars
- Madjid Fahem – guitars and bass
- David Bourguigon – drums
- Jean Michel Dercourt a.k.a. Gambeat – bass and vocals
- Roy Paci – trumpets
- Angelo Mancini – trumpets on "Politik Kills"
- Tonino Carotone – vocals and harmonies on "A Cosa"
- Amadou Bagayoko – guitar on "A Cosa"
- Cheik Tidiane – keyboard on "A Cosa"
- Flor – Spoken vocals on "A Cosa"
- Beatnik – vocals on "Tristeza Maleza"
- José Manuel Gamboa and Carlos Herrero – flamenco guitars on "Me Llaman Calle"
- Writing, composition, and production – Manu Chao
- Mixing – Mario C., Andrew Scheps, Manu Chao, and Charlie VDE Farravox
- Mastering – Adam Ayan at Gateway Sound
- Artwork – Manu Chao and Wozniak
- Photos – Chucolinai

== Charts ==
Chart (2008)	Peak position
Austrian Albums (Ö3 Austria)	5
Belgian Albums (Ultratop Flanders)	2
Belgian Albums (Ultratop Wallonia)	1
Canadian Albums (Billboard)	6
Danish Albums (Hitlisten)	20
Dutch Albums (Album Top 100)	10
Finnish Albums (Suomen virallinen lista)	13
French Albums (SNEP)	2
German Albums (Offizielle Top 100)	2
Hungarian Albums (MAHASZ)	3
Italian Albums (FIMI)	2
Mexican Albums (Top 100 Mexico)	10
Norwegian Albums (VG-lista)	7
Portuguese Albums (AFP)	11
Scottish Albums (Official Charts)	61
Spanish Albums (Promusicae)	1
Swedish Albums (Sverigetopplistan)	4
Swiss Albums (Schweizer Hitparade)	1
UK Albums (Official Charts)	41
UK Album Downloads (Official Charts)	31
US Billboard 200	71
US Billboard Top Latin Albums	1
US Top Alternative Albums (Billboard)	23
US Independent Albums (Billboard)	7
US Top Rock Albums (Billboard)	23

Year-end charts

Chart (2007)	Peak position
US Billboard Top World Albums	14

== Sales and certifications ==
Region	Certification	Certified units/sales
Argentina (CAPIF)	Gold	20,000^{^}
Belgium (BRMA)	Gold	15,000^{*}
France	—	400,000
Hungary (MAHASZ)	Gold	3,000^{^}
Switzerland (IFPI Switzerland)	Platinum	30,000^{^}
United States (RIAA)	Gold (Latin)	111,000
Summaries
Europe	—	500,000
Worldwide	—	1,000,000
^{*} Sales figures based on certification alone.^{^} Shipments figures based on certification alone.
