= Music for Babies =

Studio album by Howie B
- Released: 1996
- Genre: Electronic
- Label: Polydor; Island Independent
- Producer: Howie B

Howie B chronology
Music for Babies (1996)	Turn the Dark Off (1997)

Music for Babies is the debut album by the Scottish musician Howie B, released in 1996. It is about becoming a father.

Run Wrake produced an animated short to accompany the album.

== Production ==
The album was produced by Howie B and contains eight tracks. It incorporates strands of trip-hop, jazz, ambient house, and dub.

== Critical reception ==
Professional ratings
Review scores
Source	Rating
AllMusic	4/5 stars
Robert Christgau	D
The Encyclopedia of Popular Music	3/5 stars
The Guardian	5/5 stars
MusicHound Rock: The Essential Album Guide	2/5 stars
Muzik	4.5/5 stars

The Irish Times wrote that "the opening two tracks, beatless and bereft of rhythm, are gorgeous examples of extra chilled head music." The Guardian called the album "superb," writing that it "is imbued throughout with a funky, chilled-out ambience."

The Independent determined that the album "may well provide a softly comforting soundtrack to his new daughter's life, but the slowly modulated electronic tones and textures of Howie B's album struggle to offer any more substantial value." Robert Christgau concluded that the musician "takes the aimless vapidity of ambient another step toward total stasis."

AllMusic wrote that, "though Music for Babies is one step ahead of most fill-in-the-dots trip-hop, its sleepy mood is a bit too infantile." The Sunday Times deemed it "sweet but overrated."

== Track listing ==
No.	Title	Length
1.	"Music for Babies"
2.	"Cry"
3.	"Shag"
4.	"Allergy"
5.	"Away Again"
6.	"How to Suckle"
7.	"Here Comes the Tooth"
8.	"On the Way"
