= Clandestine =

Clandestine may refer to:

- Secrecy, the practice of hiding information from certain individuals or groups, perhaps while sharing it with other individuals
- Clandestine operation, a secret intelligence or military activity

== Music and entertainment ==
- Clandestine (album), a 1991 album by Entombed
- Clandestine (band), a Celtic music band from Texas, U.S.
- Clandestine, a short film included with the special limited edition of the album Sing the Sorrow by AFI
- ClanDestine, a comic book series by Alan Davis published by Marvel Comics
- Clandestine (novel), a 1983 novel by James Ellroy

== Other uses ==
- Clandestine Industries (Fashion), a merchandise line by Pete Wentz of Fall Out Boy
- La Clandestine Absinthe, a Swiss absinthe brand
- Clandestine is a name for the parasitic plant Lathraea clandestina
- Clandestine cell system, a method of organizing people

== See also ==
- Clandestine worker, a term for some illegal immigrants
- Clandestinity (canon law), an impediment to marriage in the canon law of the Roman Catholic Church
- Clandestino, an album by Manu Chao
- Clandestino is also the name of the evil antagonist of the children's series The Bluffers
- Clandestiny, a 1996 video-based puzzle computer game
- National Clandestine Service, the main U.S. intelligence agency for coordinating human intelligence services
- Conspiracy
