= Angels Go Bald:Too =

Single by Howie B

from the album Turn the Dark Off
- Released: 1997
- Genre: Instrumental
- Length: 5:20
- Label: Polydor Records
- Songwriter(s): Howie B
- Producer(s): Howie B

"Angels Go Bald:Too" is a 1997 song by Howie B. It made #36 on the UK Singles Chart. A music video, directed by Run Wrake, was produced for the single.

== Critical reception ==
Electronicmusic.com complimented the song for containing "a delightful fluffy groove that NEVER gets soppy" and compared it to "taking a bath in scented motor oil".
