= La Pegatina =

Spanish ska band

- Origin: Montcada i Reixac, Vallès Occidental
- Genres: Catalan rumba, reggae, punk music, ska
- Instruments: Drums, electric bass, percussion, guitar, accordion, trumpet
- Years active: 2003–present
- Labels: Kasba Music, Warner Music
- Members: Adrià Salas Viñallonga (voice); Rubén Sierra "Pegatina" (voice and guitar); Axel Magnani (trumpet and backing voices); Romain Renard (accordion and backing voices); Ovidi Diaz "Movidito" (percussion and backing vocals); Sergi López (drums and backing vocals); Ferran Ibañez (bass and backing vocals); Miki Florensa (electric and acoustic guitars ); Miguelón García (trombone)
- Website: lapegatina.com

La Pegatina is a ska and Catalan Rumba music group founded in 2003 in Montcada i Reixac.

== History ==
The group began their career in 2003 under the name Pegatina Sound System, with more than twenty performances on stage and a couple of songs collected in an EP, they began to tour the peninsula and play at festivals and concerts.

In 2006, and already under the name La Pegatina, after recording songs for several compilations, they recorded their first album, which would be released at the beginning of 2007. It was called Al carrer! and they paid for it themselves.

This album, as well as mixing languages such as Spanish, Catalan and Galician, had the collaboration of artists such as Manu Chao, Gambeat, Che Sudaka and Txarango.

With this album and the intense work at concerts and dealing with their self-promotion, La Pegatina appeared two years later with 4 new members, 4,500 copies sold, 180,000 Internet downloads and a tour that took them around Switzerland, France, Italy and Spain, where they had more than 250 concerts. In the final tour concert, at the Sala Apolo in Barcelona, there was a sold out 10 days before the performance.

In February 2009, they released their new album, Via Mandarina, produced by Kasba Music and recorded in the studios of "La Atlántida". This album counted with the collaboration of musicians from D'callaos and El Puchero del Hortelano, amongst others. Once again, they also express themselves in different languages such as Catalan, Galician, Spanish and Portuguese. In the 2009 tour ("Via Mandarina Tour") they performed in Spain, England, France, Germany and Switzerland amongst others.

The group consolidated itself as a phenomenon that breaks with all old foundations of the music industry, continuously adhering to social networks and followed by thousands of fans, even if they didn't conform to the commercial circuit. At the beginning of 2010 they received the award for Best 2009 Pop / Rock Artist from Enderrock magazine, as well as the award for Best Website (www.lapegatina.com).

This served to give a new impetus to the project and to establish themselves as a reference band in Europe as well. That year, they played in the Netherlands, Austria, Liechtenstein, France, Italy and Canada, too.

In February 2011 they presented the album that would consolidate them as one of the great national and European groups. The album is called Xapomelön, released once more by Kasba Music. The album features Joan Garriga, Amparo Sánchez, the rappers In*digna and the Sey Sisters.

In 2011, they also visited China with a special tour called La PegaChina.

In February 2013 they released their fourth album Eureka!, which has 15 songs. This album includes the participation of Mario Díaz, Romi Anauel, Love of Lesbian, Esne Beltza and the Sicilians Baciamoleman. They also presented the documentary La Pegatina: El docu.

At the beginning of 2014 they presented the new Lloverá y yo veré Tour in which they continued playing their star songs in different countries. On 12 May, their fifth album, Revulsiu, went on sale. An album with the collaboration of Dubioza Kolektiv, Capitán Cobarde, Ska-P, Hanggai, Turttle Island, MS Maiko, Rayden from the A3Bandas group and Oques Grasses. They presented it in Madrid, Barcelona and Bilbao and the tour went through Asia, Europe and South America, without forgetting other Catalan venues such as Canet Rock, Clownia or towns like Mataró, Igualada or Mollerussa.

== Members ==
- Rubén Sierra: Voice and guitar
- Adrià Salas: Voice and guitar
- Ovidi Díaz: Flamenco Box Drum, percussion, ambient music and backing vocals
- Ferran Ibañez: Bass and backing vocals
- Axel Magnani: Trumpet and backing vocals
- Romain Renard: Accordion, voice and backing vocals
- Sergi López: Drums
- Miki Florensa: Electric and acoustic guitar. After forming part of the groups Els Llums de Colors and Möndo Loco, he joined the project La Gran Pegatina as an electric guitarist, when the group temporarily grew from 7 to 13 members. He recorded the solo album Antártica (EP, Calaverita Records, 2021).
- Miguelón García: Trombone

== Discography ==
- Al carrer!. 2007
- Via Mandarina. 2009
- Xapomelön. 2011
- Eureka!. 2013
- Revulsiu. Warner Music, 2015
- Cançó: «Jo et seguiré», 2017.
- Ahora o nunca. Warner Music, 2018.
- Darle la vuelta. Warner Music, 2020

== Tours ==
- La Pegatina, 2003
- La Pegatina Sound System, 2004
- Calentando Motores, 2005
- Moviditos, 2006
- Al Carrer!, 2007
- La Conxi Tour, 2008
- Via Mandarina, 2009
- Mira que mira, 2010
- Xapomelön, 2011
- Adrenalina, 2012
- Eureka!, 2013
- Lloverá y yo veré, 2014
- Revulsiu, 2015
- La gran Pegatina, 2016
- World Tour, 2017
- Ahora o nunca, 2018
- La fiesta más grande del año, 2019
