= Switch (Howie B song) =

Single by Howie B

from the album Turn the Dark Off
- Released: 1997
- Genre: Instrumental
- Length: 4:59
- Label: Polydor Records
- Songwriter(s): Howie B
- Producer(s): Howie B

"Switch" is a 1997 song by Howie B. It made #62 on the UK Singles Chart. A music video for the song, directed by Run Wrake, was produced.
