= Turn the Dark Off =

Studio album by Howie B
- Released: July 28, 1997
- Genre: Electronic
- Length: 51:05
- Label: Polydor; Island Records
- Producer: Howie B

Howie B chronology
Music for Babies (1996)	Turn the Dark Off (1997)	Snatch (1999)

Turn the Dark Off is a 1997 album by Howie B. It made #58 on the UK Albums Chart and at the end of that year was voted at #47 on NME's 1997 Critics' Poll.

== Background ==
Turn the Dark Off is a less repetitive work than his first album, Music for Babies. Whereas Music for Babies contained exclusively instrumentals, Turn the Dark Off contains a single vocal track, "Take Your Partner by the Hand". In an interview with Jockey Slut magazine, Howie revealed that the vocals were added upon request; after he had finished the album and had sent the CD out, Robbie Robertson rang Howie up and told him he wanted to add vocals to the song. Other tracks contain assorted grunts and other non-coherent vocal noises.

Prior to release, Howie had worked with U2 for their 1997 album, Pop and with Björk for her third studio album, Post. Howie had previously worked with U2 on their compilation album, Original Soundtracks 1. To produce the album, he used, among other things, a turntable and a Nord Lead.

== Singles ==
"Angels Go Bald:Too" was released as the lead single in July 1997 and charted at #36 on the UK Singles Chart. Three months later, "Switch" was released and suffered from a sophomore slump, stalling at #62. In February 1998, Howie released the one vocal song from the album, "Take Your Partner by the Hand", which charted at #74.

== Critical reception ==
Critical reception was mixed. John Bush of AllMusic said that the album "fits in with the crop of late-'90s big beat maestros; though it doesn't quite outdistance the pack, the album still contains enough of Howie B's studio tweaks to make it worthwhile". Electronicmusic.com concurred, suggesting that it might be "one of the coolest CD's to have in your collection this summer" and that it was "full of wonderful moments". In addition, New Musical Express described it as a high Ennio Morricone-esque "warm, dripping collage of beats and buzzing melodies" that was "a pleasant change of pace from the cut-and-paste formula of other popular rock-techno acts".

However, Jim DeRogatis gave the album a negative review, dismissing it as a "Whitman's Sampler of current electronic sounds", adding that "Howie would have been better off focusing his considerable talents to hone a particular sound, as he did on Music for Babies, rather than dabbling half-heartedly in a lot of them". Matt Diehl was even less kind, finishing a diatribe by calling it a "techno turnoff".

== Track listing ==
No.	Title	Length
1.	"Fizzy in My Mouth/Your Mouth"	4:22
2.	"Hopscotch"	5:14
3.	"Switch"	4:59
4.	"Sore Brown Eyes"	4:15
5.	"Take Your Partner by the Hand"	7:22
6.	"Limbo"	4:58
7.	"Angels Go Bald:Too"	5:20
8.	"Who's Got the Bacon?"	4:25
9.	"Baby Sweetcorn (Come Here)"	4:29
10.	"Butt Meat"	5:41
Total length:		51:05
