= Take Your Partner by the Hand =

- CD cover art

Single by Howie B ft. Robbie Robertson

from the album Turn the Dark Off
- Released: 1998
- Genre: Electronica, rock
- Length: 7:22
- Label: Polydor Records
- Songwriter: Howie B/Robbie Robertson
- Producer: Howie B

"Take Your Partner by the Hand" is a 1998 song by Howie B featuring Robbie Robertson. It samples The Electric Prunes' "Holy Are You".

The song was the least commercially successful of the three singles from the Turn the Dark Off album, charting at #74 on the UK Singles Chart.

== Background ==
In an interview, Howie B said of the song:

Robbie Robertson from The Band, Bob Dylan's backing band is on it. He phoned me up three or four months ago when I was doing the U2 stuff. He was like, 'Howie I've just heard something you've done. I don't know if you know who I am but I'd love to do some tunes'. I was like, 'Magic! let's do that! ' He kept sending me cassettes in Dublin. In December we hooked up and did three tunes. Crazy fucking tunes. Then when I finished my album I sent him out a CD and he rang up and said, 'Howie I'd love to do a vocal on 'Take Your Partner By The Hand'. I was like, 'Magic!'"

According to the album's liner notes, Howie B notes that it is the only song on the album with coherent vocals on it.

== Music video ==
A music video was produced for the song by Run Wrake.

== Critical reception ==
Jim DeRogatis gave the song a negative review, saying, "For the benefit of those older listeners who are still having trouble with this new-fangled music, Howie B includes 'Take Your Brother By the Hand', a track co-written by former Band leader Robbie Robertson. It features Robertson reciting pseudo-Beat poetry ('Where am I, on this elevator to nowhere?') over a strange and slinky groove, but it never really establishes a mood". Electronicmusic.com disagreed, saying, "A narrative on 'Take Your Partner By The Hand' describes some dreamy inner city situation similar to the ramblings of the entrepreneur on Grace Jones' Slave To The Rythm [sic] who subsequently [sic] jettisons her to stardom".

== Appearances in other media ==
The DJ Premier remix of the song was featured in the album Contact from the Underworld of Redboy. It was also included in Robertson's 2002's compilation album, Classic Masters, which raised the ire of AllMusic chief editor Stephen Thomas Erlewine, who dismissed it as a "non-starter, since not only did he not have hits from this era, he made albums that were mood pieces, intended to be taken that way".
