= Istanpitta (band) =

Musical group from the United States

Istanpitta is a musical group from the United States that primarily plays 10th–14th century music using traditional instruments and tunes.

It was initially formed by Al Cofrin in 1994 to perform for medieval dance music developed as part of a college thesis project at the University of Texas. But it later grew and the musical group would perform in several places throughout the United States. The instruments played include: a medieval lute, vielle, bagpipes, recorder and percussions. The band also incorporates many traditional Arabic musical styles.

Al Cofrin previously worked on a thesis project on medieval monophonic music and dances of pre-15th century transcriptions along with studies on Renaissance dance music. He played in the Celtic band Clandestine in 2006. He has performed music worldwide.

== Discography ==
- Chevrefoil (2002)
- Pilgrimage to the Shrine of Saint Mary (2005)
- Exiled (2007)
