= Contact from the Underworld of Redboy =

Studio album by Robbie Robertson
- Released: March 10, 1998
- Genre: Electronica
- Length: 60:01
- Label: Capitol/EMI Records; 7243 8 54243 2 8 C2-54243
- Producer: Howie B. Robbie Robertson; Marius de Vries; Tim Gordine; Jim Wilson

Robbie Robertson chronology
| Music for the Native Americans (1994) | Contact from the Underworld of Redboy (1998) | How to Become Clairvoyant (2011) |

Professional ratings
Review scores
| Source | Rating |
|---|---|
| Rolling Stone | 4/5 stars |

Contact from the Underworld of Redboy is an album by Robbie Robertson. It was released in 1998 by Capitol Records. The album is composed of music inspired by Aboriginal Canadian music (including traditional Aboriginal Canadian songs and chants), as well as modern rock, trip hop, and electronica, with the various styles often integrated together in the same song. It features many guest artists.

The album peaked at No. 119 on the Billboard 200.

== Critical reception ==
AllMusic wrote that Robertson's "lyrical and musical concerns can get bogged down in their own pretensions, but often, the results are provocative and unique."

== Track listing ==
1. "The Sound Is Fading" featuring Leah Hicks-Manning (lyrics: traditional; music: Howie Bernstein, Robbie Robertson) – 5:00
2. "The Code of Handsome Lake" (Robertson) – 6:11
3. "Making a Noise" (Robertson) – 5:11
4. "Unbound" (Robertson, Tim Gordine) – 4:35
5. "Sacrifice" featuring Leonard Peltier (Robertson, Marius de Vries, Peltier) – 6:18
6. "Rattlebone" (Robertson, de Vries) – 4:26
7. "Peyote Healing" featuring Verdell Primeaux and Johnny Mike (lyrics: Primeaux, Mike; music: de Vries, Robertson) – 6:10
8. "In the Blood" (Robertson, Gordine) – 4:35
9. "Stomp Dance (Unity)" featuring The Six Nations Women Singers (Robertson, Jim Wilson; traditional) – 4:49
10. "The Lights" (Robertson, Bernstein) – 5:54
11. "Take Your Partner by the Hand (Red Alert Mix)" (Robertson, Bernstein) – 6:43 [bonus track]

== Personnel ==
1. "The Sound Is Fading"

- Produced by Howie B and Robbie Robertson
- Engineered and Mixed by Howie B
- Featuring Leah Hicks-Manning – vocals
- Jeremy Shaw – keyboards and tuning
- Jules Brooks – keyboards
- Jony Rockstar – programming
- Robbie Robertson – guitar and vocals

2. "The Code of Handsome Lake"

- Produced by Marius de Vries and Robbie Robertson
- Mixed by Andy Bradfield and Marius de Vries
- Joanne Shenandoah – vocals
- James Bilagody – vocals
- Chief Jake Thomas – spoken word
- Marius de Vries – keyboards and programming
- Robbie Robertson – guitar and vocals

3. "Making a Noise"

- Produced by Howie B, Marius de Vries and Robbie Robertson
- Engineered and Mixed by Howie B
- James Bilagody, Jackie Bird, Star Nayea, Ivan Neville, Rita Coolidge, Cree Summer – vocals
- Jeremy Shaw – keyboards and tuning
- Jony Rockstar – programming
- Marius de Vries – programming
- Geoffrey Gordon – frame drum
- David Campbell – string arrangement
- Robbie Robertson – guitar and vocals

4. "Unbound"

- Produced by Tim Gordine and Robbie Robertson
- Engineered and Mixed by Tim Gordine
- Rupert Brown – drums
- Caroline MacKendrick – vocals
- Tim Gordine – keyboards and programming
- Robbie Robertson – guitar and vocals

5. "Sacrifice"

- Produced by Marius de Vries and Robbie Robertson
- Mixed by Andy Bradfield and Marius de Vries
- Featuring Leonard Peltier – spoken word
- Bonnie Jo Hunt – vocals
- Anthony Begay – vocals
- Maztl Galindo – flute
- Benito Concha – drum
- Marius de Vries – keyboards and programming
- Robbie Robertson – guitar and vocals

6. "Rattlebone"

- Produced by Marius de Vries and Robbie Robertson
- Mixed by Carmen Rizzo and Marius de Vries
- Tudjaat (Madeleine Allakariallak and Phoebe Atagotaaluk) – throat singing
- James Bilagody – vocals
- Cree Summer – vocals
- Marius de Vries – keyboards and programming
- Robbie Robertson – guitar and vocals

7. "Peyote Healing"

- Produced by Marius de Vries and Robbie Robertson
- Mixed by Andy Bradfield and Marius de Vries
- Featuring Verdell Primeaux and Johnny Mike – vocals
- Geoffrey Gordon, Jim Wilson – drums and percussion
- Marius de Vries – keyboards and programming
- Robbie Robertson – guitar

8. "In the Blood"

- Produced by Tim Gordine and Robbie Robertson
- Engineered by Tim Gordine and Mixed by Chris Fogel
- Jony Rockstar – programming
- Caroline MacKendrick – vocals
- Tim Gordine – keyboards and programming
- Robbie Robertson – guitar and vocals

9. "Stomp Dance (Unity)"

- Produced by Jim Wilson and Robbie Robertson
- Mixed by Carmen Rizzo
- The Six Nations Women Singers – vocals
- Rita Coolidge, Priscilla Coolidge, Laura Satterfield, Star Nayea – vocals
- Geoffrey Gordon – percussion
- Joel Shearer – bass
- Jim Wilson – keyboards and programming
- Vinez Pvel – re-programming
- Andrew Scheps – programming
- Robbie Robertson – guitar and vocals

10. "The Lights"

- Produced by Howie B and Robbie Robertson
- Engineered and Mixed by Howie B
- Laura Satterfield – vocals
- Jony Rockstar – programming and NC-303 treatment
- Bill Dillon – guitar
- Jeremy Shaw – keyboards and tuning
- Robbie Robertson – guitar and vocals

11. "Take Your Partner by the Hand (Red Alert Mix)"

- Remix by DJ Premier
