= Buhos =

Spanish rock band

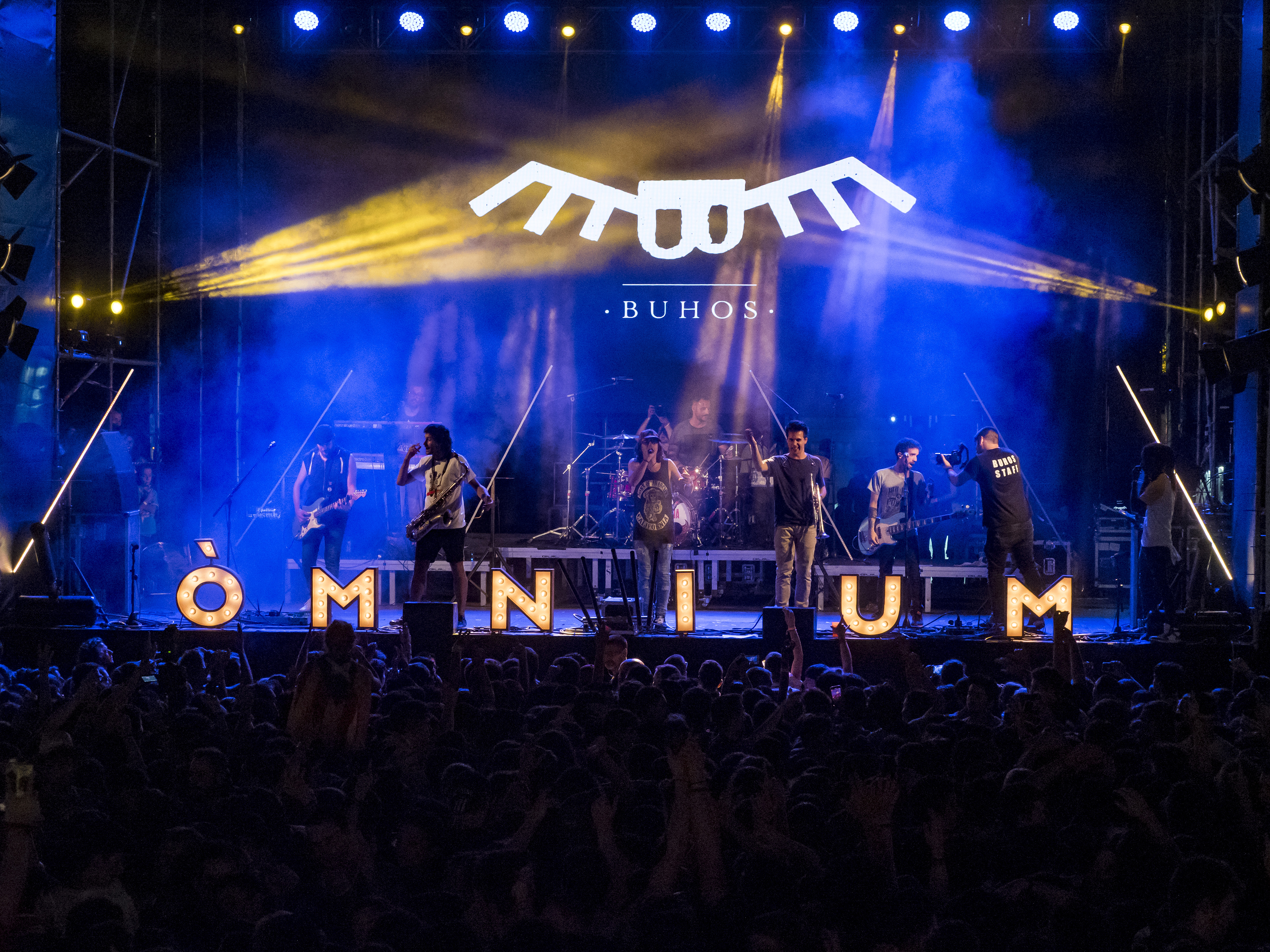
- Buhos performing at the Diada Nacional de Catalunya, 11 September 2019

Background information
- Origin: Calafell, Catalonia
- Genres: rock, ska, reggae, punk, pop
- Years active: 2005–present
- Members: Guillem Solé (voice; lyrics); Jaume Nin (guitar; songwriter); Joan Blázquez (percussion); Pep Vila-Abadal (keyboard); Josep Contreras, "Puça" (sax); Klaus Stroink (trumpet; songwriter).; Rai Benet (bass)
- Website: buhosrock.com

Buhos is a rock group from Calafell in the comarca of Baix Penedès in Catalonia, Spain which was founded in 2005.

== History ==
=== Early period (2007–2013) ===
After its founding in 2007, their first demo Rebelión was published on the street. The group gained popularity after a series of songs about FC Barcelona which they recorded for radio stations Ona FM and RAC 1. They also published satirical songs about current events for TV programs on Catalan TV station TV3. During this time, the band devoted a large part of its repertoire to covers, along with some original songs of their own.

Búhos musically celebrated soccer titles won by FC Barcelona, accompanied by Pep Guardiola in Plaça de Catalunya and in Barcelona's Arc de Triomf. During the first years of their career, the songs that could be heard at Búhos concerts were covers from other groups along with some original material, including their Niño de los 80 ("Child of the 80s", with Gerard Quintana), Messi (the first song among many dedicated to the Argentinian soccer star), Birres i més Birres Estoy Quemao, Botelló and Fiesta Mayor.

The Buhos made a compilation album in 2010 from all the demo tapes they recorded in their early period, which they called Gratis Hits.

=== Later period (2014–present) ===
In 2014, their later period began with a new line-up, and the release of their album Natura salvatge ("Wilderness") consisting of all original songs, which would become a hallmark of this period. With the release of this album, they began touring venues such as Clownia, Acampada Jove, or the annual La Mercè festival.

In March 2016, the album Lluna plena ("Full Moon") went on sale and consolidated their position as one of the leading Catalan music groups. They performed it at Clownia on Saint John's Eve and after a series of summer concerts, received Ràdio 4's Catalan Album of the Year Award and the 2016 Enderrock Award for best video for their Barcelona s'il·lumina ("Barcelona lights up"). In December of that year, they performed the TV3 Christmas song of the year, entitled Campanes de benvinguda ("Welcome Bells").

In 2018, the Buhos released La gran vida ("Living It Up"), the third album of their latter period. The album has more of a rock style, and more demanding lyrics, as in La trama ("The Plot") or La última colonia ("The Last Colony"). Weeks after the album was released they sold out the Razzmatazz in Barcelona, and the lead track of the album, "Volcans", became the 2018 song of the year by audience vote of the Enderrock audience.

In 2019 the group had its best tour ever, performing at all the top venues of the Catalan countries, including at least 70 concerts where they were headliners on top programs of Catalan music. In April 2019, the previously unpublished song "Connectats" came out.

The song Volcans by the Catalan band Búhos has been reported as a traditional musical track played to celebrate goals at the Spotify Camp Nou following its reopening, being played when FC Barcelona scores during official matches at the stadium.

== Discography ==
- Canciones para no dormir (2005)
  1. F.C. Clandestinos
  2. 100 ventanas
  3. Llámame
  4. La suegra
  5. Zumo sexual
  6. Volverás
  7. Lunes de miel
- Rebelión en la plaza (2007)
  1. La danza de la esperanza
  2. Botellón
  3. Agua
  4. Pedrito el Cantante
  5. Esta calor me está matando
  6. Estoy quemado
  7. Que tengas suerte
  8. Rock and Roll
  9. España (la fiesta de la especulación)
  10. Los vecinos de este bar
  11. La dansa de l'esperança (Bonus track)
- Radio Buhos (2009)
  1. Que es faci de nit
  2. Nen dels 80
  3. Muro de Gibraltar
  4. Estic bé
  5. Bailando en el infierno
  6. Mileurista pobre desgraciado
  7. El regidor
  8. Cógelo
  9. Birres
  10. Salir a cazar
  11. Messi
- Gratis Hits (2010)
  1. Dansa de l'esperança
  2. Birres
  3. Estoy quemao y no es del sol
  4. Salir a cazar
  5. El regidor
  6. Los vecinos de este bar
  7. Que es faci de nit
  8. Mileurista pobre desgraciao
  9. Botellón
  10. Nen dels 80
  11. L'eclipsi
  12. Correfoc
  13. Minut 92
- Cau la nit (2012)
  1. Festa Major
  2. Quan cau la nit
  3. Santuari on fire
  4. Número 1
  5. La meva inspiració
  6. Petons de color verd
  7. Aigua salada
  8. El cambrer
  9. La patrulla de l'alegria
  10. Em deixo portar
  11. La meva inspiració (digital)
- Natura Salvatge (2014)
  1. 180° (feat. Els Catarres and Strombers
  2. Brama 3. El Vaso Albert Pla i Álvarez
  3. Toca Hamelin (feat. Pulpul of Ska-P)
  4. Volem guanyar
  5. Som una melodia Miquel i Bo and Marcel "Tito" of Txarango)
  6. Chingao
  7. Res a les butxaques
  8. No serà etern
  9. Ales noves
  10. Sol naixent
- Lluna Plena (2016)
  1. La última y nos vamos
  2. El temporal
  3. Barcelona s'il·lumina
  4. Prenent la Lluna
  5. El cor m'apreta (feat. Esne Beltza)
  6. El soneto de Geppetto
  7. Mentides de plàstic Aspencat
  8. Mi vida es como un pogo
  9. Ens ballem aquesta nit
  10. Tornem al Penedès
  11. Birres
  12. Estoy quemao
- La Gran Vida (2018)
  1. Volcans
  2. La gran vida
  3. Escales fins al cel
  4. L'estiu és llibertat
  5. Transmets energia
  6. La bala del temps
  7. Els nostres tambors
  8. La trama
  9. Tu i jo som aire
  10. Cómplices del mal
  11. La darrera colònia
  12. Nos vamos pa'l festi
- Connectats (2019)

== See also ==
- Music of Catalonia
- Catalan rumba
- Doctor Prats
- World music
