= Me Gustas Tú (Manu Chao song) =

2001 single by Manu Chao

Single by Manu Chao

from the album Próxima Estación: Esperanza
- B-side: "La Primavera"
- Released: 14 May 2001
- Genre: Latin; reggae
- Length: 3:58
- Label: Virgin Records
- Songwriter: Manu Chao
- Producers: Manu Chao; Renaud Letang

Manu Chao singles chronology
"Merry Blues" (2001)	"Me Gustas Tú" (2001)	"Mr. Bobby" (2002)

Music video
- "Me Gustas Tú" on YouTube

"Me Gustas Tú" is the second single from Manu Chao's second solo album, Próxima Estación: Esperanza. One of the artist's most popular songs worldwide, Its lyrics have a simple but rhythmic structure and are mostly in Spanish with parts the chorus in French. The song, as well as two other tracks from the same album, "La primavera" and "Infinita tristeza", feature the same background music. In fact, on the album, "La primavera" fades and leads into "Me Gustas Tú".

== Music video ==
A music video was produced for the song in Urrao, Colombia, featuring Manu Chao dancing and singing the lyrics while some spare words from it appear on the screen, always surrounded by a frame of colourful patterns. A blonde woman (Spanish actress Paz Gómez) dances beside him and sings at the end of the song.

== Lyrics ==
"Me Gustas Tú" means "I like you" in Spanish (literally, "You are pleasing to me"). The text "Doce de la noche en La Habana, Cuba. Once de la noche en San Salvador, El Salvador. Once de la noche en Managua, Nicaragua" is to the radio station Radio Reloj.

== Commercial performance ==
The song reached number one in several European and Latin American countries, becoming Chao's most commercially successful single. As of 2024, it had accumulated more than 300 million plays on YouTube.

== Legacy ==
In 2025, Italian singer Alfa released "A me mi piace", featuring Chao, whose chorus reprises the melody and part of the lyrics of "Me Gustas Tú"; the song topped the Italian FIMI singles chart.

== Track listing ==
CD single

1. "Me Gustas Tú" – 3:58
2. "La primavera" – 1:52
3. "Infinita tristeza" – 3:56

== Charts ==
=== Weekly charts ===
2001 weekly chart performance for "Me Gustas Tú"
Chart (2001)	Peak position
Austria (Ö3 Austria Top 40)	29
Belgium (Ultratop 50 Flanders)	11
Belgium (Ultratop 50 Wallonia)	8
Chile (IFPI)	6
Colombia (ASINCOL)	3
France (SNEP)	2
Italy (FIMI)	1
Netherlands (Dutch Top 40)	28
Netherlands (Single Top 100)	35
Portugal (AFP)	3
Romania (Romanian Top 100)	2
Spain (Promusicae)	1
Sweden (Sverigetopplistan)	51
Switzerland (Schweizer Hitparade)	11
US Billboard Latin Pop Airplay	27
Venezuela (APFV)	1

2025 weekly chart performance for "Me Gustas Tú"
Chart (2025)	Peak position
Israel International Airplay (Media Forest)	20

=== Year-end charts ===
2001 year-end chart performance for "Me Gustas Tú"
Chart (2001)	Position
Belgium (Ultratop 50 Flanders)	66
Belgium (Ultratop 50 Wallonia)	47
Brazil (Crowley)	69
Europe (Eurochart Hot 100)	43
France (SNEP)	22
Romania (Romanian Top 100)	44
Spain (PROMUSICAE)	4
Switzerland (Schweizer Hitparade)	41

2023 year-end chart performance for "Me Gustas Tú"
Chart (2023)	Position
Switzerland (Schweizer Hitparade)	75

== Certifications ==
Region	Certification	Certified units/sales
Belgium (BRMA)	Gold	25,000^{*}
France (SNEP)	Gold	250,000^{*}
Italy (FIMI) sales since 2009	Platinum	100,000^{‡}
New Zealand (RMNZ)	Gold	15,000^{‡}
United Kingdom (BPI)	Silver	200,000^{‡}
^{*} Sales figures based on certification alone.^{‡} Sales+streaming figures based on certification alone.

== See also ==
- List of number-one hits of 2001 (Italy)
- List of number-one singles of 2001 (Spain)
