= Bongo Bong =

1999 single by Manu Chao

Single by Manu Chao

from the album Clandestino
- B-side: "Je ne t'aime plus"; "Mr. Bobby"; "Mentira..."; "Bienvenido a Tijuana"
- Released: 1999
- Genre: Reggae
- Length: 2:38
- Label: Virgin
- Songwriter: Manu Chao
- Producers: Manu Chao; Renaud Letang

Manu Chao singles chronology
"Bongo Bong" (1999)	"Clandestino" (2000)

Music video
- "Bongo Bong" on YouTube

"Bongo Bong" is the first solo single by Manu Chao, from his debut album, Clandestino. It is a remake of "King of Bongo", a track from Manu Chao's previous band, Mano Negra. The title and lyrics are taken from the 1939 jazz song "King of Bongo Bong" by Black American trumpeter Roy Eldridge. It also uses the background music from Black Uhuru's song "Bull ina di Pen", from their 1984 album, Anthem. The song is part of a medley with "Je ne t'aime plus" on Clandestino. Moreover, the music has been reused for other songs, such as "Mr. Bobby", which was first released on this single before being re-recorded for Chao's second album, Próxima Estación: Esperanza, and "Homens", from the same record.

The song is about a bongo player from the Congo.

== Track listing ==
European CD single

1. "Bongo Bong" – 2:38
2. "Je ne t'aime plus" (with Anouk) – 2:02
3. "Mr. Bobby" – 2:57
4. "Mentira..." – 4:37
5. "Bienvenido a Tijuana" – 2:43

European maxi-CD single

1. "Bongo Bong" – 2:38
2. "Je ne t'aime plus" (with Anouk) – 2:02
3. "Mr. Bobby" – 2:57
4. "Bienvenido a Tijuana" – 2:43

== Charts ==
=== Weekly charts ===
Chart (1999–2000)	Peak position
Austria (Ö3 Austria Top 40)	4
France (SNEP)	40
Germany (GfK)	7
Italy (Musica e dischi)	3
Italy Airplay (Music & Media)	1
Netherlands (Dutch Top 40)	27
Netherlands (Single Top 100)	42
Poland Airplay (Music & Media)	18
Sweden (Sverigetopplistan)	45
Switzerland (Schweizer Hitparade)	15

=== Year-end charts ===
Chart (1999)	Position
Europe Border Breakers (Music & Media)	49
Italy (Musica e dischi)	33

Chart (2000)	Position
Austria (Ö3 Austria Top 40)	38
Europe Border Breakers (Music & Media)	9
Germany (Official German Charts)	57
Switzerland (Schweizer Hitparade)	97

== Certifications ==
Region	Certification	Certified units/sales
Germany (BVMI)	Gold	300,000^{‡}
Italy (FIMI)	Platinum	100,000^{‡}
Spain (Promusicae)	Gold	30,000^{‡}
^{‡} Sales+streaming figures based on certification alone.

== Robbie Williams version ==
"Bongo Bong and Je ne t'aime plus"

Single by Robbie Williams

from the album Rudebox
- B-side: "Lovelight" (Dark Horse Mix)
- Released: 22 January 2007
- Recorded: 2006; New York City, US
- Genre: Pop
- Length: 4:48
- Label: Chrysalis; EMI
- Songwriters: Manu Chao; Anouk Khelifa
- Producer: Mark Ronson

Robbie Williams singles chronology
"Lovelight" (2006)	"Bongo Bong and Je ne t'aime plus" (2007)	"She's Madonna" (2007)

In 2006, English singer Robbie Williams recorded a version of the song that combined "Bongo Bong" with "Je ne t'aime plus", which appeared on his 2006 album, Rudebox. It was released as a single of its own in 2007. The track was produced by Mark Ronson and included vocals by Lily Allen.

=== Track listing ===
European CD single

1. "Bongo Bong and Je ne t'aime plus" – 4:48
2. "Lovelight" (Dark Horse Mix) – 6:25

=== Personnel ===
- Robbie Williams – lead vocals
- Lily Allen – backing vocals
- Tiggers – guitars
- Vaughan Merrick – Moog synthesizer
- Dave Guy – trumpet
- Neil Sugarman – tenor saxophone
- Ian Hendrickson-Smith – baritone saxophone
- Raymond Angry – Rhodes piano, keyboards
- Mark Ronson – keyboards, guitar, bass, drum programming, percussion
- Serban Ghenea – mixing

=== Charts ===
Weekly chart performance for "Bongo Bong and Je ne t'aime plus"
Chart (2007)	Peak position
Czech Republic (Rádio Top 100)	14
Italy (FIMI)	22
Italy (Musica e dischi)	31
Romania (Romanian Top 100)	45
Switzerland (Schweizer Hitparade)	77
Turkey (Turkey Top 20)	4

== Certifications ==
Certifications for "Bongo Bong"
Region	Certification	Certified units/sales
Germany (BVMI)	Gold	300,000^{‡}
Italy (FIMI) sales since 2009	Platinum	50,000^{*}
Spain (Promusicae)	Gold	30,000^{‡}
^{^} Shipments figures based on certification alone.^{‡} Sales+streaming figures based on certification alone.^{†} Streaming-only figures based on certification alone.
