= Run Wrake =

English animator (1965–2012)

- Born: John Wrake; 24 November 1965; Yemen
- Died: 21 October 2012 (aged 46); Ashford, Kent
- Occupations: Animator, film director
- Years active: 1990–2012
- Spouse: Lisa Wrake
- Children: 2

John "Run" Wrake (24 November 1965 – 21 October 2012) was an English animator, film director, graphic designer, and music video director. He was best known for his 2005 short film, Rabbit.

== Early life and education ==
Wrake was born in Yemen on 24 November 1965. His father was a chaplain assigned to the British army there. He grew up in Sussex. He studied graphic design at the Chelsea College of Arts, later graduating with an M.A. in animation from the Royal College of Art in London. His 1990 animated student film from his days at the Royal College, Anyway, aired on MTV's Liquid Television in 1994.

== Career ==
After graduating, Wrake worked freelance, illustrating and designing album covers and tour visuals for artists such as U2 and Howie B, in addition to directing commercials for companies such as Coca-Cola throughout the 1990s and early 2000s. He also directed music videos, many of which were for Howie B. He later began working with Animate Projects, which commissioned him to direct animated short films. In 2005, he released his animated short film entitled Rabbit, his most notable work. Rabbit tells a morality tale about the dangers of greed through a Dick and Jane art style. Wrake's main inspiration for the film was an envelope he found in a thrift shop containing children's educational stickers, illustrated by Geoffrey Higham, from the 1950s. The film received numerous awards and nominations, including a BAFTA nomination for Best Short Animation Film at the 2006 BAFTA Awards.

== Death ==
In November 2011, Wrake was diagnosed with lung cancer. This inspired him to direct the short film, Down with the Dawn, with music by Howie B. On 21 October 2012, aged 46, Wrake succumbed to the illness.

== Filmography ==
Film
Year	Title	Role	Notes
1990	Anyway	Director, writer	Short film
1994	Jukebox	Director	Short film
1996	Music for Babies	Director	Short film to accompany Howie B's album of the same name
1998	M2 – Ping Batter Pong	Director	Short film
2001	What Is That	Director	Short film
2002	Lessons in Smoking	Director	Short film
2002	NME Gallery	Director	Short film
2005	Rabbit	Director, producer, writer	Short film Nominated–BAFTA Award for Best Short Animation Film
2008	The Control Master	Director, writer	Short film
2009	Just a Minute	Director	Short film
2011	Here We Go Loopy Lou	Director	Short film
2011	Public Meat	Director	Short film to accompany Public Image Ltd's song "Public Image"
2012	Down with the Dawn	Director, producer	Short film to accompany Howie B's album of the same name
2012	Meat Street	Director	Unfinished pilot

Music videos
Year	Video	Artist	Role
1991	"Cadillac"	Gang of Four	Director
1993	"TV Tan"	The Wildhearts	Director
1996	"Butt Meat"	Howie B	Director
1996	"We Have Explosive"	The Future Sound of London	Director, photography
1997	"Angels Go Bald:Too"	Howie B	Director
1997	"Switch"	Howie B	Director
1998	"Maniac Melody"	Howie B	Director
1998	"Take Your Partner by the Hand"	Howie B	Director
1999	"I Can Sing but I Don't Want To"	Howie B	Director
1999	"She Called Again"	Howie B	Director
2000	"Papua New Guinea"	The Future Sound of London	Director
2001	"The Beamer"	Spacer	Director
2001	"We Belong in This World Together"	Stereo MCs	Director
2002	"Mr. Bobby"	Manu Chao	Director
2004	"Try Again Today"	The Charlatans	Director, producer
2005	"Flyover"	Asian Dub Foundation	Director
