= Clandestine (band) =

Celtic music group from Houston, Texas

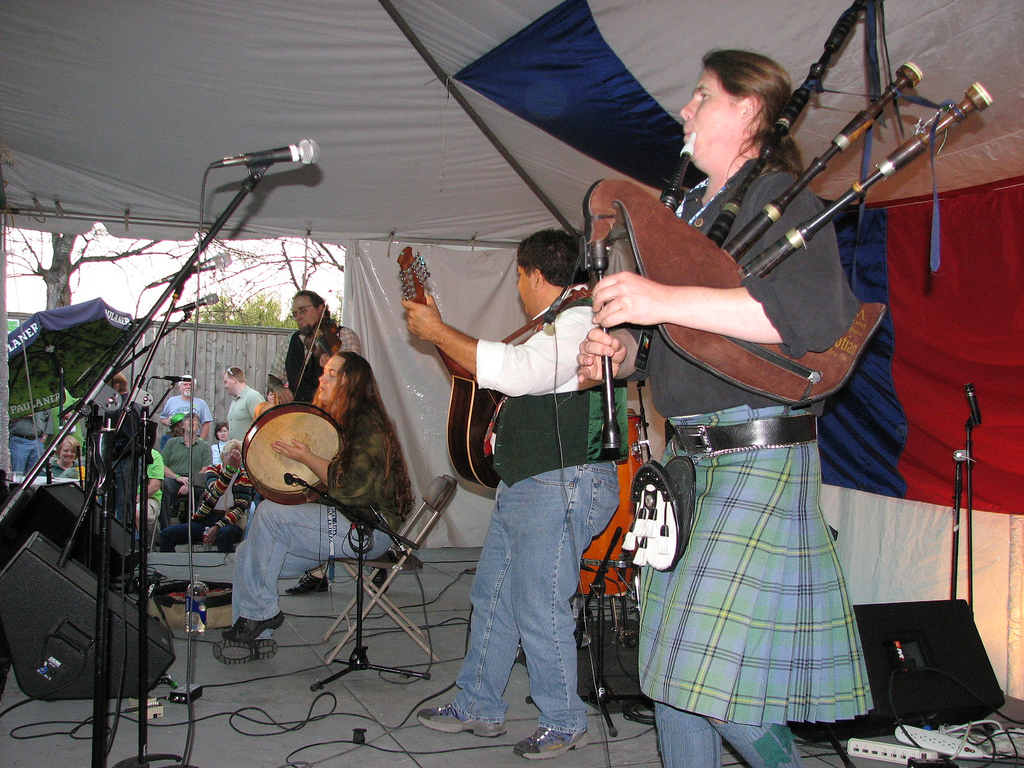
- Clandestine in 2007

Background information
- Origin: Houston, Texas, U.S.
- Genres: Celtic music
- Years active: 1995–2003, 2006–present
- Members: E.J. Jones; Emily Dugas; Gregory McQueen; Al Cofrin
- Past members: Jen Hamel
- Website: clandestineceltic.com

Clandestine is a Celtic music group from Houston, Texas. Featuring bagpipes, guitar, fiddle, and drums (bodhrán and conga drums), they play traditional Celtic music (both instrumental and vocal) as well as some modern tunes (including some originals) in a Celtic style. Some songs include additional instruments like the flute, bombarde and various whistles. They formed in 1991, stabilized as a quartet in 1996, and dissolved for a time in 2003. In their original incarnation, the band made 4 discs and toured heavily around the US and also performed in Europe. They were favorites at McGonigel's Mucky Duck Pub in their hometown of Houston, as well as the Cactus Cafe in nearby Austin.

The band reformed with a change in membership in late 2006.

== History ==
The original Clandestine was a pipe-and-drum quartet in Houston. Original member bagpiper E.J. Jones moved to Pittsburgh, met guitarist and singer Jen Hamel in Pittsburgh, and convinced her to return to Houston to perform as part of Clandestine. In 1995, fiddle player Gregory McQueen joined. The first disc (The Ale is Dear) featured this trio. In 1996 percussionist and singer Emily Dugas joined, and the remaining 3 discs include all 4 members. Jen Hamel and Emily Dugas both sang. In February 2003 the band performed their last show in that original incarnation.

In 2005, E.J., Emily and Gregory began playing with various other artists as the Emily Dugas Band. In 2006, with Jen's blessing, they officially reformed Clandestine with themselves and a fourth member, Al Cofrin, on Irish cittern, folk guitar, and medieval bagpipes. The band made their formal debut as Clandestine at the Mucky Duck Pub in Houston on St. Andrew's Day, November 30, 2006.

== Discography ==
- The Ale Is Dear (1996)
- The Haunting (1997)
- To Anybody at All (1999)
- Music from Home (live album, and the band's last) (2001)
- Fine Small Storm (Jen Hamel) (2001)
- The Willow (E.J. Jones) (2002)
- ReD (2008)

Apparently Clandestine also appears on 2 discs The Houston Music Council Eclectic Music Showcase and Blarneyfest, according to Celtic Nations World.

== See also ==
- Istanpitta
