= Mr. Bobby =

2002 song by Manu Chao

Single by Manu Chao

from the album Próxima Estación: Esperanza
- B-side: "Mr. Bobby" (Politik Kills); "Mr. Bobby" (Wyskyfacile)
- Released: 9 September 2002
- Genre: Reggae
- Length: 3:49
- Label: Virgin
- Songwriter: Manu Chao
- Producers: Manu Chao; Renaud Letang

Manu Chao singles chronology
"Me Gustas Tú" (2002)	"Mr. Bobby" (2002)	"Rainin in Paradize" (2007)

"Mr. Bobby" is the last single from Manu Chao's second album, Próxima Estación: Esperanza. Originally, the song was released in a stripped-down form without any wind instruments on the "Bongo Bong" single in 1998. The album version is built on the same backing track as "Bongo Bong" and "Homens"; in the short documentary film Infinita tristeza, included in the bonus section of Chao's 2002 live DVD Babylonia en Guagua, Chao stated that the backing track was originally recorded for "Homens".

The song, which is a tribute to reggae legend Bob Marley, had success in European countries such as Spain, Italy and Switzerland. During live performances, Manu Chao's band performs the "Politik Kills" version as it is more reggae-influenced than the album version (which has the same backing track as "Bongo Bong").

== Track listing ==
1. "Mr. Bobby" (Politik Kills)
2. "Mr. Bobby" (Wyskyfacile)
3. "Mr. Bobby"

== Music video ==
A music video directed by Run Wrake was produced for the song. Like most of Manu Chao's videos at the time, it is mostly animated except for the singer.

== Charts ==
Chart (2002)	Peak position
Belgium (Ultratip Bubbling Under Flanders)	17
France (SNEP)	86
Italy (FIMI)	16
Spain (Promusicae)	15
Switzerland (Schweizer Hitparade)	60

== B.o.B cover ==
American musician B.o.B recorded a cover of the song, with original lyrics, which can be found on his fifth mixtape, B.o.B vs. Bobby Ray (2009).
