= Radio Bemba Sound System =

Live album by Manu Chao
- Released: 17 September 2002
- Recorded: 4–5 September 2001
- Genres: Latin, reggae, ska
- Length: 1:04:24
- Label: Virgin
- Producer: Renaud Letang

Manu Chao chronology
Próxima Estación: Esperanza (2001)	Radio Bemba Sound System (2002)	Sibérie m'était contéee (2004)

Professional ratings
Review scores
Source	Rating
Allmusic	4/5 stars
Entertainment Weekly	A−
Pitchfork Media	(8.0/10)

Radio Bemba Sound System is a live album by Manu Chao that was released in 2002. It is the accompanying CD to the performer's live DVD Babylonia en Guagua, filmed over two nights (4–5 September) in 2001 during the tour for Proxima Estacion: Esperanza. Many of the songs found on Radio Bemba Sound System, such as "Machine Gun", "Peligro","Mala Vida","King Kong Five" and "The Monkey", are songs originally recorded by Manu Chao's previous band, Mano Negra. However the arrangements performed with Radio Bemba Sound System are more reggae-, ska-, and rock-oriented. The album is sequenced and edited in such a way that there is very little audience noise and cheering between the tracks, thus giving the impression of an all-night happy party - which calms down in the penultimate track ("Minha Galera") only to explode again in the last one ("Promiscuity"); the cheering at the end of "Promiscuity" is cut short by a very early fade.

== Track listing ==
1. "Intro" – 0:50
2. "Bienvenida a Tijuana" – 01:55
3. "Machine Gun" – 02:13
4. "Por Dónde Saldrá el Sol?" – 02:41
5. "Peligro" – 03:09
6. "Welcome to Tijuana" – 02:50
7. "El Viento" – 02:41
8. "Casa Babylon" – 02:34
9. "Por el Suelo" – 03:55
10. "Blood and Fire" – 02:35
11. "EZLN... Para Tod@s Todo..." – 01:41
12. "Mr. Bobby" – 03:36
13. "Bongo Bong" – 01:05
14. "Radio Bemba" – 00:20
15. "Qué Pasó Qué Pasó" – 00:54
16. "Pinocchio (Viaggio In Groppa Al Tonno)" – 00:45
17. "Cahí en la Trampa" – 02:10
18. "Clandestino" – 02:59
19. "Rumba de Barcelona" – 03:31
20. "La Despedida" – 04:02
21. "Mala Vida" – 02:26
22. "Radio Bemba" – 00:34
23. "Qué Pasó Qué Pasó" – 01:10
24. "Pinocchio (Viaggio In Groppa Al Tonno)" – 00:45
25. "La Primavera" – 03:32
26. "The Monkey" – 01:59
27. "King Kong Five" – 02:44
28. "Minha Galera" – 03:17
29. "Promiscuity" – 01:44

== Personnel ==
Radio Bemba Sound System is also the name of Manu Chao's backing band, named for the communication system used in the Sierra Maestra by the Castro-and-Guevara-led rebels in the Cuban Revolution.

- Vocals and rhythm guitar – Manu Chao
- Lead guitar – Madjid Fahem
- Bass guitar – Jean Michel Dercourt a.k.a. Gambeat
- Drum kit – David Bourguignon
- Percussion – Gerard Casajus Gaita
- Keyboards – Julio García Lobos
- Vocals – Bidji a.k.a. Lyricson
- Trumpet – Roy Paci
- Trombone – Gianny Salazar Camacho (Q.E.P.D)
- Accordion – B-Roy

== Charts ==
=== Weekly charts ===
Chart (2002)	Peak position
Austrian Albums (Ö3 Austria)	16
Belgian Albums (Ultratop Flanders)	10
Belgian Albums (Ultratop Wallonia)	1
Danish Albums (Hitlisten)	35
Dutch Albums (Album Top 100)	52
French Albums (SNEP)	3
German Albums (Offizielle Top 100)	32
Italian Albums (FIMI)	13
Norwegian Albums (VG-lista)	13
Swedish Albums (Sverigetopplistan)	20
Swiss Albums (Schweizer Hitparade)	2

=== Year-end charts ===
Chart (2002)	Position
Belgian Albums (Ultratop Wallonia)	82
Canadian Alternative Albums (Nielsen SoundScan)	178
French Albums (SNEP)	53
Swiss Albums (Schweizer Hitparade)	54

Chart (2003)	Position
Belgian Albums (Ultratop Flanders)	96

== Certifications ==
Region	Certification	Certified units/sales
Argentina (CAPIF)	Gold	20,000^{^}
Belgium (BRMA)	Gold	25,000^{*}
France (SNEP)	2× Gold	200,000^{*}
Spain (Promusicae)	Gold	50,000^{^}
Switzerland (IFPI Switzerland)	Gold	20,000^{^}
^{*} Sales figures based on certification alone.^{^} Shipments figures based on certification alone.
