= Howie B =

Scottish musician (born 1963)

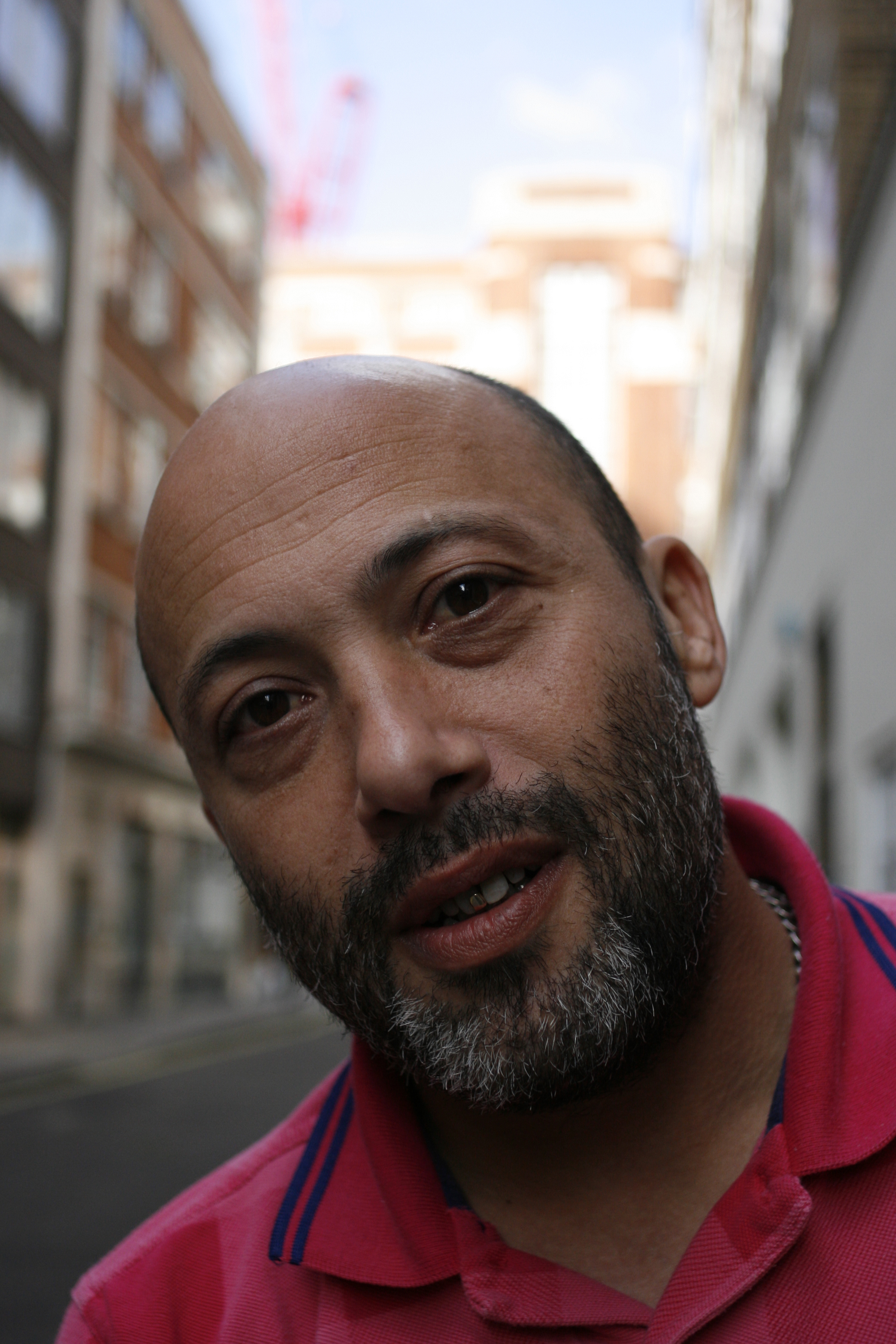
- Howie B in 2007

Background information
- Born: Howard Simon Bernstein; 18 April 1963 (age 63); Glasgow, Scotland
- Genres: Trip hop, electronic
- Occupation: Music producer
- Label: Island Records

Howard Simon Bernstein (born 18 April 1963, Glasgow, Scotland) is a Scottish musician, producer and DJ, who has worked with artists including Björk, U2, Tricky, Siouxsie and the Banshees, Soul II Soul, Robbie Robertson, Elisa, Mukul Deora, Marlene Kuntz and the Gift.

== Early life and career ==
Born into a Jewish family amidst the Catholic-Protestant sectarianism of Glasgow, Bernstein attended socialist Jewish youth clubs in the city while finding a musical education in John Peel's radio shows, recording tracks from the show on a two-track tape recorder and making rudimentary mixes from them.

Later, he spent a year in Israel working on a kibbutz as part of Jewish cultural youth movement Habonim before living for a period in the United States.

Once back in the UK, he moved to a squat in Limehouse, London. When asked in 2018 "What’s the best gig you've ever been to?", he mentioned "Siouxsie and the Banshees in 1978". In the 1980s, he was "heavily influenced" by the London skating scene and its DIY attitude. He saved to buy an album a week and then listened to it all day long. The bands he liked the most at the time were "Siouxsie and the Banshees - of which I was a big fan - but also Santana, John McLaughlin, Sly & Robbie, a lot of reggae, and Brian Eno".

He had a desire to work in the music industry, and after establishing himself as a DJ, he found a job working as a teaboy at Lillie Yard studios, owned by film composer Hans Zimmer. He worked his way up there between 1984 and 1986, from teaboy to tape operator to assistant engineer to engineer. He learnt there all the technical details and procedures.

== Artist production, engineering and collaboration ==
He started working mixing and engineering with Siouxsie and the Banshees, on their 1988 singles "Peek-a-Boo" and "The Killing Jar". "I could not believe I was doing it. Four years earlier I'd been jumping up on the stage trying to touch her, and then I'm in the studio with her. That was a big moment". He engineered and mixed on Soul II Soul's debut album Club Classics Vol. One in 1989, after he befriended the group during regular visits to their parties at London's Africa Centre. By the early 1990s, he was hired by Massive Attack and Goldie. Following the success of these collaborations, he left Lillie Yard to go freelance. In 1993, he set up his own label Pussyfoot.

He worked as a programmer for Björk on several albums, engineering on 1995's Post and co-writing "I Miss You". His mix of "All is Full of Love" was included in the final cut of her following album, 1997's Homogenic.

At the same time, he collaborated with U2 on different projects. He supervised their side-project Passengers: Original Soundtracks 1 alongside producer Brian Eno. He was heavily involved in the U2's electronically focused Pop in 1997, co-producing it with Flood. "At the beginning they were trying to find a role for me" he said of the beginning of the project. "My original title was 'DJ and Vibes'. It was a bit of a difficult title to be given, because some of the tunes didn't need that kind of input – it's not as though there's scratching and loops all over the record. And vibes... that's a really difficult word to describe, and to put your finger on. So it was a bit ad hoc at first. As we got further and further into the project, the role I was playing came out – I was co-producer, engineer, and mixer. I gave the band a direct line into club culture and freestyle DJing." He then embarked on their PopMart tour, for a DJ set.

Other notable credits include producing Tricky's Ponderosa, performing 'noises' on Marlene Kuntz's Ricoveri Virtuali E Sexy Solitudini, producing two albums (Reale and collaborative album Not in the Face) for Italian funk rock group Casino Royale, producing and co-writing Take Your Partner by the Hand with Robbie Robertson for his album Turn the Dark Off, producing Sly and Robbie's album Drum & Bass Strip to the Bone, producing a solo project for U2's The Edge and producing for Hal Willner.

In 2021, Italian duo Pinhdar released the album Parallel, produced by Howie B. He told ondarock that "this is one of the records I'm most proud of."

== Solo career ==
He has been releasing music under his own name since the early 1990s, as well as under other various monikers and as part of groups including ambient/electronica Skylab. His productions appeared on seminal electronic labels including Mo'Wax and Eye Q, while he signed with major label Polydor (sister label Island in the US) for a deal that spanned four full-length albums and several singles.

As a DJ, he compiled and mixed FabricLive.05 for London nightclub Fabric's nascent label in 2002.

His album Down with the Dawn, was announced in late 2013 and released on 9 April 2014.

== Film scores, TV, advertising music and theatre ==
He produced a remix of the cover version of "Theme from Mission: Impossible" for the 1996 feature-film remake, called "Mission: Impossible Theme (Mission Accomplished)" performed by U2 members Adam Clayton and Larry Mullen, Jr., which peaked at No. 7 in both the UK and US charts and sold over 500,000 copies.

He has produced, co-produced, composed and written a number of scores and soundtracks for full-length feature and short films alike, including The End of Violence with Ry Cooder, Dollhouse, How To Sell A Banksy, Double Xposure, Lost in Thailand, Brick, Dr. Chan Cheng, Made in China and Rabbit. He frequently collaborated with director Run Wrake, who would animate short films and music videos set to accompany Howie B's music. He also soundtracked a pornographic film directed by Jacob Pander.

His TV work includes creating music for BBC One's Imagine documentary on The Royal Ballet's principal guest artist Carlos Acosta, for a Dazed & Confused short film project Stop for a Minute and for a Dazed series on Channel 4.

His work for advertising campaigns includes creating music for Maserati, Hyundai, Range Rover, Hugo Boss and BUPA.

He collaborated with Argentine theatre group De La Guarda on an album produced by one of their members, Gaby Kerpel, whom he mentored.

His remix of "Cherry Lips" by Garbage is used after every home run hit by the Milwaukee Brewers.

Howie scored the soundtrack to the documentary The Sinking of the Lisbon Maru, a look at the sinking of the Japanese freighter, which was torpedoed carrying 2,000 British prisoners of war back in 1942. He wrote the title track "A Long Way From Home".

Howie's composition work can be seen in the documentary Kiss The Future, which tells a story of defiance amid the 1990s' siege of Sarajevo during the Bosnian War. Howie accompanied U2 to Sarajevo to support them in their tour.

== Pussyfoot Records and HB records ==
His label, Pussyfoot Records, ran from 1994 to 2002 and released over 20 albums and compilations and around 50 singles.

He set up HB Records in 2013 to release a new album Down with the Dawn.

== Discography ==
=== Albums ===
- Music for Babies (1996)
- Turn the Dark Off (1997) – UK No. 58
- Sly and Robbie drum & bass Strip to the Bone by Howie B (1998)
- Snatch (1999)
- Folk (2001)
- Another Late Night: Howie B (DJ mix album, 2001)
- FabricLive.05 (DJ mix album, 2002)
- Last Bingo in Paris (2004)
- Mayonnaise (2004) with Crispin Hunt and Will O'Donovan
- Music for Astronauts and Cosmonauts (2007)
- Howie B vs Casino Royale: Not in the Face - Reale Dub Version (2008)
- Good Morning Scalene (2010)
- Down with the Dawn (2014)

=== Chart singles ===
- "Angels Go Bald: Too" (1997) – UK No. 36
- "Switch" (1997) – UK No. 62
- "Take Your Partner By the Hand" (1998) – UK No. 74 †

† Howie B featuring Robbie Robertson from Contact from the Underworld of Redboy

=== Remixes ===
- Angélique Kidjo – "Agolo (How's Tricks mix)"
- Garbage – "Cherry Lips (Go Baby Go!)" (Howie B remix)
- Unkle – "The Time Has Come" (Howie B vs U.N.K.L.E. remix)
- Björk – "Hyperballad" (Robin Hood Riding Through The Glen mix)
- Annie Lennox – "Waiting in Vain" (Howie B Sub Aqua remix)
- Simply Red – "You Make Me Believe" (Howie B remix)
- New Order – "Age of Consent" (Howie B remix)
- Model 500 – "The Flow" (Howie B mix)
- Polaroid Kiss – "Pay Your Dues" (Howie B mix)
- U2 – "Discothèque" (Howie B Hairy B mix)
- Placebo – "Pure Morning" (Howie B remix)
- The Creatures (Siouxsie Sioux's second band) – "Prettiest Thing" (Howie B Hormonal mix)
- Steve Reich – "Eight Lines" (Howie B remix)
- Leftfield – "Dusted" (Howie B vocal remix)
- Jeff Beck – "What Mama Said" (remix)
- Serge Gainsbourg – "Ballade De Melody Nelson" (Howie B remix)
- Ofeliadorme – "Paranoid Park" (Howie B remix)
- Metric – "The Police and the Private" (Howie B Remix)

== Production ==
- East 17 – "All I Want"
- Tricky – "Aftermath"
- Tricky – "Ponderosa"
- Björk – Post
- Tricky – Maxinquaye
- Everything but the Girl – "Flipside"
- Adam Clayton & Larry Mullen, Jr. – "Theme from Mission: Impossible"
- U2 – Pop
- Björk – Homogenic
- Elisa - Asile's World
- The Gift – Film
- Overunit Machine – Ungod EP
- Casino Royale – Reale
- Les Négresses Vertes - Trabendo
- Robbie Robertson – Contact from the Underworld of Redboy (1998)
- Ofeliadorme
- Nylo – Soft Escape (2011)
- Pinhdar - Parallel (2021)

== Participations ==
- Emmaus Mouvement – Emmaus Mouvement 50th anniversary record (1999)
