= Gambeat =

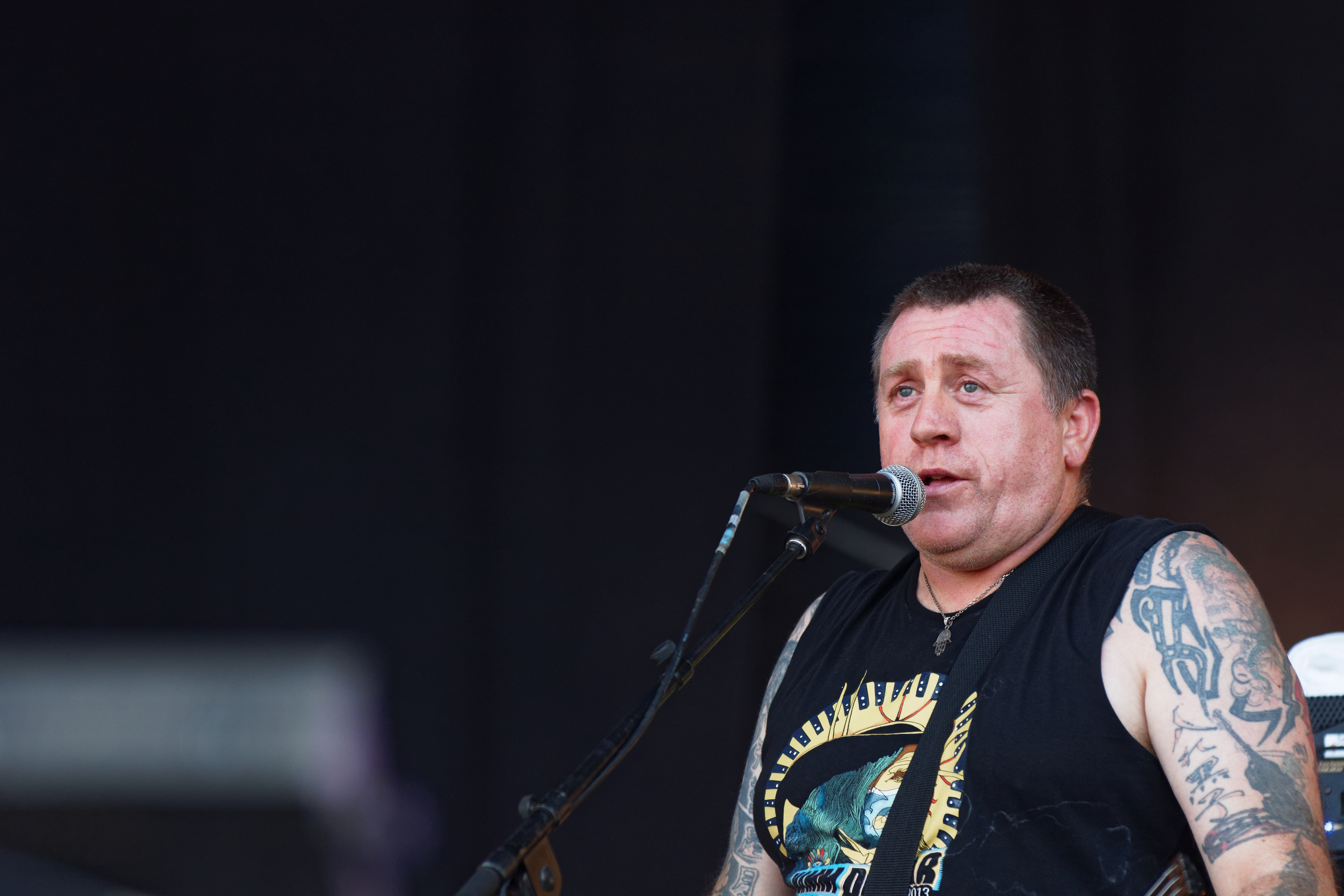
Gambeat with Calypso Rose in concert at the 2016 old plough festival.

Gambeat is the stage name of Jean Michel Dercourt, a French bass guitarist and DJ, best known for his musical collaboration with Manu Chao. As a member of the Parisian group French Lovers, Gambeat travelled with Manu Chao and his band Mano Negra during their famous rail tour through civil war-racked Colombia in the early 1990s. The tour was later commemorated in Ramon Chao's book The Train of Ice and Fire.

After Mano Negra was disbanded and a new band Radio Bemba founded by Manu Chao, Gambeat became one of its integral members alongside Madjid Fahem. Thanks to his distinctive appearance and high-energy playing, Gambeat was one of the most charismatic presences at the band's live performances; he often appeared shirtless on stage, his burly torso heavily tattooed, playing the double bass guitar, which he had named (according to Ramon Chao) "Madame Dercourt".
