= Clandestino (Manu Chao song) =

Single by Manu Chao

from the album Clandestino
- B-side: "Bienvenido A Tijuana" (More Image Version); "Mama Call"
- Released: 11 July 2000
- Genre: Reggae; Latin music
- Songwriter: Manu Chao
- Producers: Manu Chao; Renaud Letang

Manu Chao singles chronology
"Bongo Bong" (1999)	"Clandestino" (2000)	"Merry Blues" (2001)

"Clandestino" is the second single and the title track from Manu Chao's first album, Clandestino. The lyrics of the song are sung in Spanish and deal with the issue of immigration: "I wrote it about the border between Europe and those coming from poorer nations. Look around — maybe 30% of the people in this street are clandestino [illegal]." The song peaked at number 78 on the French charts. It charted again in November 2013, peaking at number 196.

== Track listings ==
1. "Clandestino"
2. "Bienvenido A Tijuana" (More Image Version)
3. "Mama Call"
4. "Clandestino" (Enhanced Video)

== Music video ==
A music video was produced for the song along with the album track which appears on the single, "Mama Call".

== Cover versions ==
- Argentinian singer Pil Trafa (El monopolio de las palabras, 2004)
- Playing for Change released a version, featuring Manu Chao and other musicians from around the world (2014)
- Adriana Calcanhotto (Público - (Ao Vivo), 2000)
- Tihuana (Ilegal, 2000)
- Fiorella Mannoia (Concerti, 2004)
- Scala & Kolacny Brothers (2005)
- El Gafla (featuring Manu Chao) (pA/Ris-Casbah, 2006)
- José Mercé
- NoBraino (in Italian)
- Modena City Ramblers (Tracce clandestine, 2015)
- Lila Downs (Al Chile, 2019)
- Sombra Alor (2025)

== Certifications ==
Region	Certification	Certified units/sales
Italy (FIMI)	Gold	50,000^{‡}
^{‡} Sales+streaming figures based on certification alone.
