= Próxima Estación: Esperanza =

Studio album by Manu Chao
- Released: 12 May 2001
- Genres: Worldbeat; Latin alternative
- Length: 45:33
- Languages: Arabic; English; French; Galician; Brazilian Portuguese; Spanish
- Label: Virgin
- Producer: Renaud Letang

Manu Chao chronology
| Clandestino (1998) | Próxima Estación: Esperanza (2001) | Radio Bemba Sound System (2002) |

Singles from Próxima Estación: Esperanza
- 1. "Merry Blues" Released: 2001; 2. "Me Gustas Tú" Released: 14 May 2001; 3. "Mr. Bobby" Released: 9 September 2002

Professional ratings
Review scores
| Source | Rating |
|---|---|
| AllMusic | 3/5 stars |
| DownBeat | 4/5 stars |
| Pitchfork | 7.7/10 |
| Q | 4/5 stars |
| Rolling Stone | 3.5/5 stars |
| Spin | 8/10 |
| Uncut | 4/5 stars |
| The Village Voice | A |

Próxima Estación: Esperanza (English: Next Station: Hope) is the second studio album by French latin artist, Manu Chao. The album was released originally in Europe on 12 May 2001 and was later released in the United States and surrounding regions on 5 June 2001 by Virgin Records.

== Background ==
The album title comes from a sample of an announcement for the Esperanza station of Madrid Metro's Line 4; in Spanish "esperanza" means "hope". Another Line 4 station, named Avenida de la Paz (literally "Peace Avenue") is also mentioned several times on the album, but the two stations are actually several blocks apart, and the sample used by Chao actually consists of two separate announcements pasted together. The voice actor Javier Dotú and a Metro announcer later sued for infringement of intellectual property rights over the use of their voices.

== Music and lyrics ==
Chao and features sing in Arabic, English, French, Galician, Portuguese and Spanish on various songs on the record. The backing track to "Homens", a tight rap about various kinds of men, written and performed by Brazilian journalist Valeria dos Santos Costa, is identical to the backing track for "Bongo Bong", Chao's successful single from four years earlier; however, in the short documentary film Infinita tristeza (included within the bonus section of his 2002 live DVD Babylonia en Guagua), Chao stated that "Homens" was the song for which the well-known backing track was originally recorded. The same backing track also underpins "Mr. Bobby" on this album and "Je ne t'aime plus" on Clandestino (1998). "La Primavera" likewise shares its backing music with "Me Gustas Tú", into which it fades directly on the album.

The final song on the album, "Infinita Tristeza", does not contain any vocals by Chao, but it consists of the same backing track as "Me Gustas Tú", over which several samples and soundbites are layered; most of them come from a cartoon-based TV documentary film about pregnancy and childbirth, produced in 1977 by TVE and aimed at children. A number of voice samples from the documentary are looped and repeated throughout the track in Chao's typical fragmented style.

== Reception and legacy ==
Próxima Estación: Esperanza received a Grammy nomination for Best Latin Rock/Alternative Performance. In 2010 Esperanza was listed at #65 in Rolling Stone's "Best Albums of the Decade." In 2012, the magazine listed it at No. 474 on its list of the 500 greatest albums of all time, saying "this gem gave Americans a taste of [Chao's] wild-ass greatness. Chao rocks an acoustic guitar over horns and beat-boxes while rambling multilingually about crucial topics from politics to pot."

== Track listing ==
All tracks are written by Manu Chao, except where noted.

| No. | Title | Writer(s) | Language | Length |
|---|---|---|---|---|
| 1. | "Merry Blues" | | English | 3:36 |
| 2. | "Bixo" | | Galician | 1:52 |
| 3. | "El Dorado 1997" | Chao, François Meslouhi, Tito Velez | Portuguese | 1:29 |
| 4. | "Promiscuity" | | English | 1:36 |
| 5. | "La Primavera" | | Spanish | 1:52 |
| 6. | "Me Gustas Tú" | | Spanish; French | 4:00 |
| 7. | "Denia" | | Arabic | 4:39 |
| 8. | "Mi Vida" | | Spanish | 2:32 |
| 9. | "Trapped by Love" | | English | 1:54 |
| 10. | "Le Rendez-Vous" | | English; French | 1:56 |
| 11. | "Mr. Bobby" | | English | 3:49 |
| 12. | "Papito" | | Spanish | 2:51 |
| 13. | "La Chinita" | | Spanish | 1:33 |
| 14. | "La Marea" | | Mexican Spanish | 2:16 |
| 15. | "Homens" | Chao, Valeria dos Santos Costa | Brazilian Portuguese | 3:18 |
| 16. | "La Vacaloca" | | Spanish | 2:23 |
| 17. | "Infinita Tristeza" | | Spanish | 3:56 |

== Charts ==
=== Weekly charts ===
| Chart (2001) | Peak position |
|---|---|
| Austrian Albums (Ö3 Austria) | 2 |
| Belgian Albums (Ultratop Flanders) | 3 |
| Belgian Albums (Ultratop Wallonia) | 1 |
| Danish Albums (Hitlisten) | 5 |
| Dutch Albums (Album Top 100) | 3 |
| Finnish Albums (Suomen virallinen lista) | 10 |
| French Albums (SNEP) | 1 |
| German Albums (Offizielle Top 100) | 4 |
| Hungarian Albums (MAHASZ) | 21 |
| Italian Albums (FIMI) | 1 |
| Norwegian Albums (VG-lista) | 4 |
| Spanish Albums (PROMUSICAE) | 1 |
| Swedish Albums (Sverigetopplistan) | 6 |
| Swiss Albums (Schweizer Hitparade) | 1 |
| US Top Latin Albums (Billboard) | 8 |

=== Year-end charts ===
Year-end chart performance for Próxima Estación: Esperanza
| Chart (2001) | Position |
|---|---|
| Austrian Albums (Ö3 Austria) | 46 |
| Belgian Albums (Ultratop Flanders) | 24 |
| Belgian Albums (Ultratop Wallonia) | 16 |
| Canadian Albums (Nielsen SoundScan) | 162 |
| Dutch Albums (Album Top 100) | 46 |
| European Albums (Music & Media) | 16 |
| French Albums (SNEP) | 4 |
| German Albums (Offizielle Top 100) | 35 |
| Spanish Albums (AFYVE) | 10 |
| Swedish Albums (Sverigetopplistan) | 35 |
| Swiss Albums (Schweizer Hitparade) | 3 |

| Chart (2002) | Position |
|---|---|
| French Albums (SNEP) | 113 |

== Certifications and sales ==
| Region | Certification | Certified units/sales |
|---|---|---|
| Argentina (CAPIF) | Platinum | 40,000^{^} |
| Belgium (BRMA) | Platinum | 50,000^{*} |
| Canada (Music Canada) | Gold | 50,000^{^} |
| France (SNEP) | 3× Platinum | 900,000^{*} |
| Greece (IFPI Greece) | Gold | 15,000 |
| Italy (FIMI) | Platinum | 100,000^{*} |
| Netherlands (NVPI) | Gold | 40,000^{^} |
| Spain (Promusicae) | 2× Platinum | 200,000^{^} |
| Switzerland (IFPI Switzerland) | 3× Platinum | 120,000^{^} |
| United Kingdom (BPI) | Silver | 60,000^{*} |
| United States (RIAA) | Platinum (Latin) | 100,000^{^} |
Summaries
| Europe (IFPI) | 2× Platinum | 2,000,000^{*} |
| Worldwide | — | 3,000,000 |
^{*} Sales figures based on certification alone.^{^} Shipments figures based on certification alone.

== See also ==
- List of best-selling Latin albums
