= Clandestino =

Studio album by Manu Chao
- Released: 6 October 1998
- Genres: Reggae rock; worldbeat
- Length: 45:51
- Labels: Virgin; Ark21; Mafia Cartel Studio
- Producers: Manu Chao; Renaud Letang

Manu Chao chronology
Clandestino (1998)	Próxima Estación: Esperanza (2001)

Singles from Clandestino
- 1. "Bongo Bong" Released: 1999; 2. "Clandestino" Released: 11 July 2000

Clandestino is the debut studio album by French artist Manu Chao, released in 1998. The album contains many soundbites throughout, two of which are bits of a speech by Subcomandante Marcos and, like Chao's subsequent albums, was mostly recorded by the musician himself in various locations around the world, using a small laptop—which is referred to in the liner notes as Estudio Clandestino. The French edition of Rolling Stone magazine named this album the 67th greatest French rock album (out of 100). The album was also included in the book 1001 Albums You Must Hear Before You Die. The album was ranked number 469 in Rolling Stone's list of the 500 Greatest Albums of All Time in 2020.

== Background ==
Clandestino emerged from a period of personal and professional upheaval for Manu Chao, following the breakup of his band, Mano Negra, in 1994. Mano Negra had been a pioneering force in the world of punk-infused Latin rock, but after years of internal strife and a chaotic tour across war-torn Colombia, the group disbanded before their 1994 studio album Casa Babylon was even released. The aftermath of this experience left Chao in a fragile state, both personally and professionally.

For the next three years, Chao spiraled into a deep sense of restlessness and depression, continuing his music career by performing at bars in Tijuana and Rio. He wandered across Europe, Africa, and South America, unable to settle anywhere for long. His journey took him through cities like London, Paris, and Naples, and even to Colombia and Mexico, where he found solace among the Zapatistas and experimented with peyote. Chao's mental health reached a low point in Brazil, where he came close to taking his own life. It was here, in a rundown Rio favela, that an encounter with a cow, which he described as "tender," gave him a renewed sense of purpose, pulling him back from the brink. Chao's time as a wandering musician deeply influenced the creation of Clandestino.

== Recording ==
The recording process was unconventional. Chao's journey took him to places like Tijuana and Mexico, where he immersed himself in the raw energy of the border region and spent time with the Zapatistas. During these travels, he began recording ideas on a portable recorder, capturing not just his own music, but also street sounds, snippets of conversation, and other noises that would later shape the atmosphere of the album. Chao returned to Spain, armed with little more than his portable recorder, on which he had stored the songs and sounds. He continued writing more songs in Madrid and Galicia before making his way to Paris, where he briefly worked on an album with former girlfriend Anouk for Virgin. This experience pushed him into thinking about creating his own album from the 50 songs and snippets he had accumulated during his travels.

The process of making the album was somewhat haphazard. By the summer of 1997, Chao began organizing his recordings, deciding which tracks to develop further. In Paris, he partnered with producer Renaud Letang to sift through a collection of songs that would eventually form the album. Initially, the album had a strong electronica influence, with dance beats dominating the sound. However, as Chao continued to experiment, a technical glitch with Letang's computer inadvertently stripped out most of the electronic elements and drums, leaving behind a more acoustic, organic sound. Rather than being discouraged, Chao embraced the unexpected turn of events, famously stating, "le hazard est mon ami"—"chance is my friend." Chao later described the process as "pure therapy," reflecting the cathartic nature of the album for him personally. He and Letang continued experimenting with different mixes, even testing the tracks on the children of Chao's neighbors. According to Chao, the songs that resonated most with the children were the ones that ultimately made the cut. The result was an album that felt completely unique and unlike anything they had heard before. As Letang described it, they felt as though they had "given birth to a UFO," something entirely foreign to the music scene at the time. However, industry professionals were skeptical, with many expecting the album to have limited appeal, mainly among Mano Negra's fanbase.

== Release ==
When the album was released, few predicted its eventual success. Without a major promotional campaign or a band to support it, Clandestino seemed an unlikely contender for commercial success. Mainstream radio stations avoided it, citing the controversial drug references in songs like "Welcome to Tijuana" as reasons for not playing it. Critics doubted the album's ability to break through, suggesting it would sell only a few thousand copies, primarily to fans of Mano Negra. Despite this, Clandestino began to gain momentum organically, especially among travelers and backpackers in popular destinations like Ko Samui and Puerto Escondido. Its lack of promotion allowed word-of-mouth to fuel its success. A year after its release, Clandestino entered the French Top 10 and remained on the charts for the next four years. It eventually became a massive international hit, selling over five million copies and becoming regarded as a modern classic in Europe and South America. Its success prompted Chao to begin work on a follow-up album, Próxima Estación: Esperanza.

== Critical reception ==
Professional ratings
Review scores
Source	Rating
AllMusic	5/5 stars
Q	4/5 stars
Uncut	9/10

Clandestino received positive reviews from music critics. John Bush of AllMusic described the album as an "enchanting trip through Latin-flavored worldbeat rock," highlighting its eclectic mix of musical styles and noting that Chao's "infectious, freewheeling delivery" made tracks like "Mentira" and "Bongo Bong" particularly compelling. Nigel Williamson of Uncut called it a "stoner classic," emphasizing its "bouncing global rhythms" and the way Chao's "irresistible rhythms and message of resistance continue to sound fresh and vibrant a generation on."

== Track listing ==
No.	Title	Language	Length
1.	"Clandestino"	Spanish	2:30
2.	"Desaparecido"	Spanish; Brazilian Portuguese	3:47
3.	"Bongo Bong"	English	2:38
4.	"Je ne t'aime plus"	French	2:02
5.	"Mentira..."	Spanish	4:37
6.	"Lágrimas de Oro"	Spanish	2:57
7.	"Mama Call"	English	2:21
8.	"Luna y Sol"	Spanish	3:07
9.	"Por el Suelo"	Spanish	2:21
10.	"Welcome to Tijuana"	Spanish; English	4:04
11.	"Día Luna... Día Pena"	Spanish	1:30
12.	"Malegría"	Spanish	2:55
13.	"La vie à 2"	French	3:00
14.	"Minha Galera"	Brazilian Portuguese	2:21
15.	"La Despedida"	Spanish	3:09
16.	"El Viento"	Spanish	2:26

== Personnel ==
Credits adapted from AllMusic:

Music

- Manu Chao – primary artist, composer, drums, producer
- Chico César
- Angelo Mancini – trumpet
- Antoine Chao – trumpet
- Jef Cahours – trombone
- Anouk – vocals
- Awa Touty Wade – vocals

Production

- Cedric Champalou – mixing assistant
- Greg Calbi – mastering
- Laurent Lupidi – producer
- Renaud Letang – producer

== Charts ==
=== Weekly charts ===
Chart (1998–2016)	Peak position
Austrian Albums (Ö3 Austria)	13
Belgian Albums (Ultratop Flanders)	20
Belgian Albums (Ultratop Wallonia)	20
Danish Albums (Hitlisten)	29
French Albums (SNEP)	1
German Albums (Offizielle Top 100)	14
Hungarian Albums (MAHASZ)	12
Italian Albums (FIMI)	20
Dutch Albums (Album Top 100)	45
Norwegian Albums (VG-lista)	35
Spanish Albums (Promusicae)	80
Swiss Albums (Schweizer Hitparade)	9

=== Year-end charts ===
Chart (1998)	Position
French Albums (SNEP)	19
Spanish Albums (AFYVE)	50

Chart (1999)	Position
Belgian Albums (Ultratop Wallonia)	52
French Albums (SNEP)	6

Chart (2000)	Position
Austrian Albums (Ö3 Austria)	43
Belgian Albums (Ultratop Wallonia)	92
French Albums (SNEP)	53
German Albums (Offizielle Top 100)	56
Swiss Albums (Schweizer Hitparade)	35

Chart (2001)	Position
Belgian Albums (Ultratop Flanders)	70
Belgian Albums (Ultratop Wallonia)	52
French Albums (SNEP)	26
Swiss Albums (Schweizer Hitparade)	85

Chart (2002)	Position
French Albums (SNEP)	74

== Certifications and sales ==
Region	Certification	Certified units/sales
Argentina (CAPIF)	Platinum	60,000^{^}
Austria (IFPI Austria)	Gold	25,000^{*}
Belgium (BRMA)	2× Platinum	100,000^{*}
Canada (Music Canada)	Gold	50,000^{^}
France (SNEP)	Diamond	1,000,000
Germany (BVMI)	Gold	250,000^{^}
Greece (IFPI Greece)	Gold	15,000^{^}
Italy 1998-2000 sales	—	300,000
Italy (FIMI) sales since 2009	Platinum	50,000^{‡}
Netherlands (NVPI)	Gold	50,000^{^}
Spain (Promusicae)	Platinum	100,000^{^}
Switzerland (IFPI Switzerland)	2× Platinum	100,000^{^}
United Kingdom (BPI)	Gold	100,000^{‡}
Uruguay (CUD)	Gold	3,000^{^}
Summaries
Europe (IFPI)	Platinum	1,000,000^{*}
Worldwide	—	3,000,000
^{*} Sales figures based on certification alone.^{^} Shipments figures based on certification alone.^{‡} Sales+streaming figures based on certification alone.
