= 11th Pedro Sienna Awards =

- Date: August 5, 2017
- Site: Municipal Theatre, Chillán
- Hosted by: Daniela Vega; Matías Assler

Highlights
- Best Picture: Much Ado About Nothing Rara
- Best Actor: Sergio Hernández; You'll Never Be Alone
- Best Actress: Paulina Urrutia; Chameleon
- Most awards: Neruda (5)
- Most nominations: Chameleon (11)

The 11th Pedro Sienna Awards were presented at the Municipal Theatre in Chillán on August 5, 2017 given by the National Council of Culture and the Arts (CNCA) to honour the best in Chilean films of 2017. Daniela Vega and Matías Assler hosted the ceremony.

The nominees were announced on July 19, 2017. Chameleon led the nominations with eleven including Best Film, Best Director, Best Actor, Best Actress twice, Best Supporting Actor and Best Screenplay, followed by Much Ado About Nothing with nine nominations.

Much Ado About Nothing won Best Film, as well as Best Screenplay. Rara won Best Film too. Neruda won the most awards with five. Jorge Riquelme won Best Director for Chameleon.

== Winners and Nominees ==
Best Picture	Best Director
Much Ado About Nothing; Rara; Chameleon	Jorge Riquelme – Chameleon; Alejandro Fernández Almendras – Much Ado About Nothing; María José San Martín – Rara
Best Actress	Best Actor
Paulina Urrutia – Chameleon as Paulina; Paulina Moreno – 7 semanas as Camila; Paula Zuñiga – Chameleon as Paula	Sergio Hernández – You'll Never Be Alone as Juan; Gastón Salgado – Chameleon as Gastón; Agustín Silva – Much Ado About Nothing as Vicente
Best Supporting Actress	Best Supporting Actor
Mariana Loyola – Rara as Paula; Paulina García – Much Ado About Nothing as Roxana; Francisca Vidal – La mujer de la esclavina as Alicia	Roberto Farías – Neruda as Singer; Alejandro Sieveking – Fragmentos de Lucía as Emilio; Alejandro Goic – Much Ado About Nothing as Uncle Julio
Best Screenplay	Best Original Score
Much Ado About Nothing - Alejandro Fernández and Jerónimo Rodríguez; Chameleon - Jorge Riquelme; El primero en la familia - Carlos Leiva	Chameleon - Carlos Cabezas; Much Ado About Nothing - Domingo García Huidobro; You'll Never Be Alone - Álex Anwandter
Best Documentary Film	Best Documentary Short Film
Quilapayún, más allá de la canción; Atrapados en Japón; Te Kuhane o Te Tupuna (El espíritu de los ancestros)	Yo no soy de aquí; Hemos estado peor; Materia prima
Best Short Film	Best Animated Short Film
Y todo el cielo cupo en el ojo de la vaca muerta; Cazador; Non Castus	Cantar con sentido; W.A.R.F.
Best Art Direction	Best Cinemaography
Neruda - Estefanía Larraín; El primero de la familia - Ignacio Ruiz; You'll Never Be Alone - Andrea Contreras	Neruda - Sergio Armstrong; Much Ado About Nothing - Inti Briones; You'll Never Be Alone - Matías Illanes
Best Make-Up	Best Costume Design
Neruda - Margarita Marchi; Chameleon - Patricia Figueroa; Un caballo llamado Elefante - Michelle Cervera	Neruda - Muriel Parra; Chameleon - Patricia Figueroa; Un caballo llamado Elefante - Carolina Espina
Best Editing	Best Special Effects
Much Ado About Nothing - Alejandro Fernández and Soledad Salfate; Chameleon - Valeria Hernández and Jorge Riquelme; El primero de la familia - Macarena Yurjevic	Un caballo llamado Elefante - Raúl Prado; Chameleon - Margarita Marchi; Neruda - Tomás Roca

== Honorary Award ==
- Jacqueline Mouesca

== Films by number of nominations and awards ==
Films by number of nominations
Film	Nominations
Chameleon	11
Much Ado About Nothing	9
Neruda	6
You'll Never Be Alone	4
Rara	3
El primero de la familia	3
Un caballo llamado Elefante	3

Films by number of awards
Film	Awards
Neruda	5
Chameleon	3
Much Ado About Nothing	3
Rara	2
You'll Never Be Alone	1
El caballo llamado Elefante	1
