= Pedro Sienna Awards =

- Awarded for: Best film and audiovisual work
- Sponsored by: National Council of Culture and the Arts
- Date: 31 January 2006
- Country: Chile
- Website: pedrosienna.cultura.gob.cl

The Pedro Sienna Awards (Spanish: Premios Pedro Sienna) are honors granted for Chilean audiovisual production. Named for silent film director Pedro Sienna, they were given for the first time in 2006. Outstanding artists are awarded for the development and strengthening of national audiovisual media and the best works, artists, and technicians of the production of works released in the country between January and December of the previous year.

They came about as a result of Law No. 19.981 of 2005 that created the Council of the Art and Audiovisual Industry (CAIA) and the Audiovisual Promotion Fund, both under the National Council of Culture and the Arts (CNCA).

Pedro Sienna was one of the forerunners of Chilean cinema, directing El Húsar de la Muerte (1925) and winning the National Prize for Art in 1966.

The aim of the awards is to recognize an author, artist, technician, or producer who stands out for their artistic quality or projection of their audiovisual work and the relevant activities of dissemination and preservation of audiovisual production.

Except for the Career award, given by the CAIA, the awards are granted by a jury. Two pre-selection committees choose the nominees in the categories for feature films and short films.

All winners receive the Pedro Sienna sculpture. It was created by Cristina Pizarro, an outstanding sculptor, and inspired by the lens of a camera. It is made of stainless steel with a base of black granite.

== Ceremony format ==
Beginning with their first edition, the Pedro Sienna Awards were handed out at the end of each year to reward the best of that year. However, in 2016 it was decided to move the awards ceremony to the middle of the year, modifying the period of the release dates of the films that are eligible. That is, beginning with the 10th edition, the awards celebrate the best of the previous year. So although there is no version called 2015 Pedro Sienna Awards, strictly speaking, the films released that year were awarded in 2016.

== Summary of winners ==
Edition	Date	Best Picture	Best Director	Best Actor	Best Actress	Location	Presenter
1st	31 Jan 2006	Play	Alicia Scherson	—N/a	Blanca Lewin	Museum of Visual Arts, Santiago	Esperanza Silva
2nd	31 Jan 2007	La Sagrada Familia	Sebastián Lelio	Jaime Vadell	Patricia López	Museum of Visual Arts, Santiago	—N/a
3rd	31 Jan 2008	Life Kills Me	Pachi Bustos; Jorge Leiva	Daniel Muñoz	Marcela Osorio	Castillo Hidalgo, Santiago	Gloria Laso
4th	31 Mar 2009	The Good Life	Andrés Wood	Alfredo Castro	Aline Kuppenheim	Teatro Huemul, Santiago	Javiera Contador
5th	1 Sept 2010	The Maid	Sebastián Silva	Eduardo Paxeco	Catalina Saavedra	Teatro Oriente, Santiago	Blanca Lewin
6th	25 Nov 2011	Violeta Went to Heaven	Patricio Guzmán	Martín Castillo	Francisca Gavilán	Cine Sala Estrella, Punta Arenas	Mariana Loyola
7th	9 Nov 2012	No; My Last Round	Cristián Jiménez	Luis Dubó	Bélgica Castro	J. Bohr Municipal Theater, Punta Arenas	Elisa Zulueta; Luis Gnecco
8th	29 Nov 2013	Gloria	Raúl Ruiz	Sebastián Ayala	Paulina García	J. Bohr Municipal Theater, Punta Arenas	Mariana Loyola; Luis Alarcón
9th	19 Dec 2014	The Dance of Reality	Sebastián Silva	Jaime Vadell	Paulina García	Quinta Normal Park, Santiago	Juanita Ringeling; Héctor Morales
10th	1 Aug 2016	The Club	Pablo Larraín	Luis Gnecco	Catalina Saavedra	U. of Concepción Theater, Concepción	Sigrid Alegría; Pablo Cerda
11th	5 Aug 2017	Much Ado About Nothing; Rara	Jorge Riquelme	Sergio Hernández	Paulina Urrutia	Municipal Theater, Chillán	Daniela Vega; Matías Assler
12th	20 June 2022	A Fantastic Woman	Claudia Huaiquimilla	Andrew Bargsted	Antonia Zegers	—N/a	—N/a
13th	14 December 2024	Nobody Knows I'm Here	Maite Alberdi	Alfredo Castro	Amparo Noguera	Centro Cultural Gabriela Mistral, Santiago	Elisa Zulueta; Paloma Salas
14th	14 December 2024	My Brothers Dream Awake	Claudia Huaiquimilla	Alfredo Castro	Javiera Velázquez	Centro Cultural Gabriela Mistral, Santiago	Elisa Zulueta; Paloma Salas
15th	14 December 2024	1976	Manuela Martelli	Néstor Cantillana	Antonia Zegers	Centro Cultural Gabriela Mistral, Santiago	Elisa Zulueta; Paloma Salas
16th	14 December 2024	The Settlers	Felipe Gálvez Haberle	Jaime Vadell	Paula Zúñiga	Centro Cultural Gabriela Mistral, Santiago	Elisa Zulueta; Paloma Salas
17th	26 September 2025	The Dog Thief	Alfredo Pourailly de la Plaza	Gastón Salgado	Amparo Noguera	Centro Cultural Gabriela Mistral, Santiago	Elisa Zulueta; Paloma Salas

== Categories ==
- Best Fiction Feature Film, since 2007
- Best Documentary Feature Film, since 2007
- Best Director, since 2006
- Best Cinematography, since 2006
- Best Editing, since 2006
- Best Original Music, since 2006
- Best Screenplay, since 2006
- Best Art Direction, since 2006
- Best Special Effects, since 2007
- Best Costume Design, since 2007
- Best Makeup, Since 2007
- Best Lead Actress Performance, since 2006
- Best Lead Actor Performance, since 2006
- Best Supporting Actress Performance, since 2009
- Best Supporting Actor Performance, since 2009
- Best Fiction Short Film, since 2009
- Best Animated Short Film, since 2009
- Best Documentary Short Film, since 2007
- Career Award, since 2006

=== Discontinued categories ===
- Best Feature Length Fiction, Animated, or Documentary Film (2006 only)
- Best Costume or Makeup Design (2006 only)
- Best Sound Design (only 2007)
- Best Soundtrack (2008 only)
- Best Supporting Performance (2006, 2007, and 2008)
- Best Short or Medium-length Film (2006 only)
- Best Fiction or Animated Short Film (2007 and 2008)

== See also ==
- Altazor Award
- Pablo Neruda Order of Artistic and Cultural Merit
