= Paulina Urrutia =

Chilean actress and politician

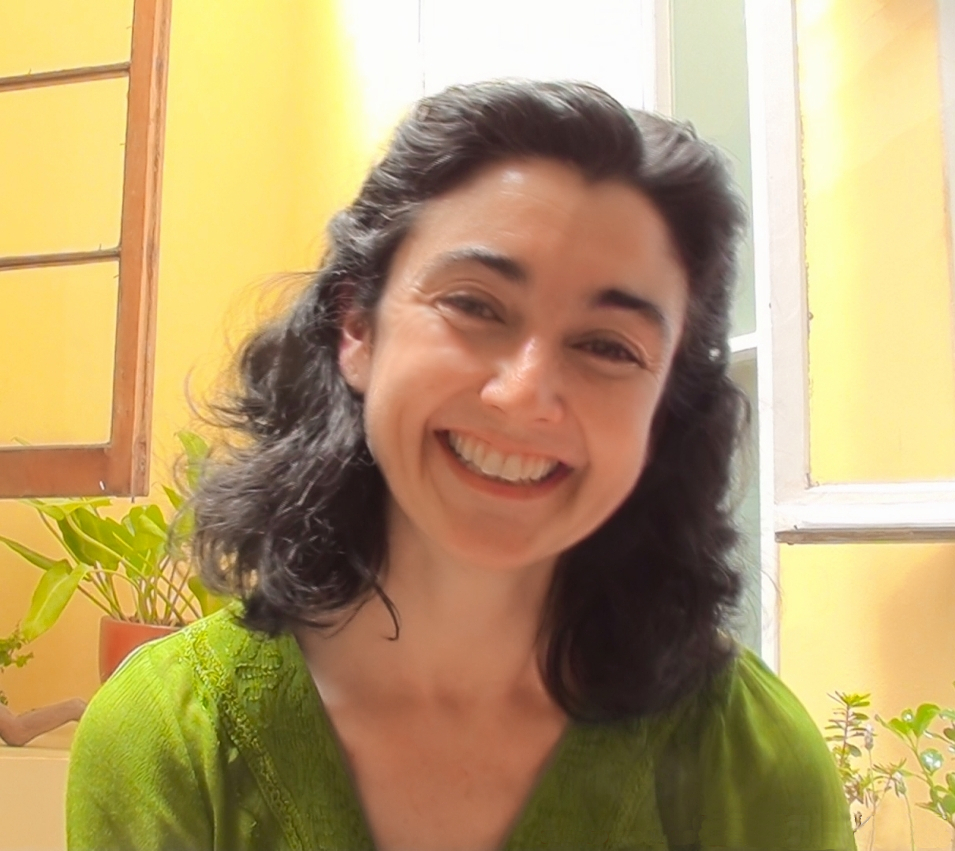
- Urrutia in 2014

Minister-president of the National Council of Culture and the Arts of Chile
- In office March 11, 2006 – March 11, 2010
- President: Michelle Bachelet
- Preceded by: José Weinstein
- Succeeded by: Luciano Cruz-Coke

Personal details
- Born: Paulina Marcela Urrutia Fernández; January 1969 (age 57) Santiago, Chile
- Spouse: Augusto Góngora (m. 2016; died 2023)
- Education: Pontifical Catholic University of Chile
- Occupation: Actress, politician

Paulina Marcela Urrutia Fernández (born January 1969) is a Chilean actress and former culture minister. She served as minister-president of the National Council of Culture and the Arts from 2006 to 2010, during the first presidency of Michelle Bachelet.

Urrutia became known for the title role in the television miniseries Teresa de los Andes (1989) and subsequently worked in theater, film and television. Her acting awards include Altazor Awards for Fuera de control, Devastados and La amante fascista, and a Pedro Sienna Award for Camaleón. Before entering government, she was a leader of the Chilean actors' union, Sidarte.

She and her late husband, the documentary filmmaker Augusto Góngora, were the subjects of Maite Alberdi's documentary The Eternal Memory (2023), which follows their life together after his diagnosis with Alzheimer's disease.

== Early life and education ==
Paulina Marcela Urrutia Fernández was born in Santiago, Chile, in January 1969. She grew up in San Miguel and attended the Colegio Compañía de María. Her parents both worked in public administration. She joined the theater school at the Pontifical Catholic University of Chile in 1985. She began working as an actress while still a student, but received her acting degree in January 2025, decades after leaving the school.

== Early acting career ==
Urrutia made her stage debut in 1987, at age 18, in Esperando la carroza. Her profile was raised when she played the title role in the 1989 television miniseries Teresa de los Andes. Urrutia later recalled that producer Sonia Fuchs persuaded her to audition for the role while she was studying theater, after she had avoided earlier television auditions out of fear. In a 2023 interview, she described the sudden public recognition following the series as traumatic. After filming the miniseries, director Vicente Sabatini invited her to join the cast of El milagro de vivir. She began working with Alfredo Castro in 1989, and their early collaborations included Teatro La Memoria's production of La manzana de Adán.

In 1992, Urrutia played La Chica del Peral in Teatro La Memoria's Historia de la sangre, directed by Castro. The production drew on testimonies collected in prisons and psychiatric institutions and formed the second part of the company's Trilogia Testimonia de Teatro La Memoria. In a 2018 interview, Ramón Griffero recalled her performance as a breakthrough in her career.

Her other collaborations with Castro included the television productions Volver a empezar (1991) and Puertas adentro (2003), the film Fuga (2006), and the stage production Devastados, an adaptation of Sarah Kane's Blasted. Her first film was Johnny 100 Pesos (1993), for which she received an Asociación de Periodistas de Espectáculos (APES) award for best film actress. She played the leading role of Paula Quesney in Jaque mate (1993). Looking back in 2020, she described the workload and criticism of her performance as distressing and said the experience led her to avoid further leading roles in telenovelas.

In 1999 she played Sarita Mellafe in Canal 13's telenovela Fuera de control, winning the Altazor Award for best television actress the following year. In a 2016 interview, she recalled her surprise that the antagonist was neither killed nor imprisoned at the end of the series. She received another Altazor Award, for theater acting, for Devastados in 2003.

== Union and politics ==
Urrutia served as general secretary of Sidarte, the Chilean actors' union, and became its president in 2001. By January 2006 she sat on the national board of the National Council of Culture and the Arts and taught at the theater school of the University of Chile. That month, President-elect Michelle Bachelet chose her, a member of no political party, to succeed José Weinstein as the council's minister-president. She held the post, equivalent to Minister of Culture, from March 2006 to March 2010, and was the first woman to do so. Writing in 2014, the sociologist and cultural manager Arturo Navarro Ceardi called the choice of an insider a smooth transition and wrote that, in her first press interview, she identified audiences as the new priority of public cultural policy. She paused her acting work while in government. The Council had ministerial status but operated through a governing board that included representatives from the arts and cultural sectors. In a 2007 interview with Página 12, Urrutia defended this collective structure and said that she would prioritize decentralization, support for artistic endeavors and public access to culture.

In June 2007 she launched a cultural centers program intended to benefit districts with a population of more than 50,000 by 2010. The program's initial allocation of more than two billion Chilean pesos covered 28 districts and could be used either for new infrastructure or for refurbishment. The stated aims included developing audiences and providing spaces for artistic activity.

In her end-of-year review in December 2007, Urrutia announced a 33% increase in the council's budget for 2008. Initiatives to convert the fire-damaged Diego Portales building into the Centro Cultural Gabriela Mistral and develop new heritage institutions were announced. In March 2009 the council's staff association, Anfulcultura, criticized her administration over delays in payments for funded projects and working conditions. The Council responded that it had taken steps to resolve outstanding payments and rejected the association's claim that it had failed to maintain dialogue with employees. By November 2009, the cultural centers program had 54 centers under construction, rehabilitation or remodeling nationwide, with investment in excess of 21 billion Chilean pesos since 2007.

Urrutia, and the culture minister of Uruguay, María Simón, signed a two-year renewable memorandum of understanding between the countries in July 2008. It sought to foster collaboration, paricularly through film co-production.

In August 2009, Bachelet reprimanded Urrutia for using her taxpayer-funded car to attend a campaign event in support of Eduardo Frei Ruiz-Tagle. A few days later, Urrutia was aboard a helicopter that distributed 50,000 postcards by Chilean photographers across Santiago from the air, to mark the National Day of Photography.

On January 13, 2010, the Senate of Chile unanimously approved amendments to the intellectual property law to protect copyright, thereby completing its passage through the National Congress of Chile and meaning that it would pass to the President for formal sign-off. Urrutia spoke during the vote, calling it a historic step and stressing the need for modern, balanced copyright legislation.

Her term ended in March 2010, when new President Sebastián Piñera named the actor Luciano Cruz-Coke as her successor. Urrutia commented "Vuelvo a lo mío, al teatro." (I'm back to what I do best, to the theater.")

== Return to acting and later work ==
After her ministerial term, Urrutia returned to the stage in La amante fascista, written by Alejandro Moreno and directed by Víctor Carrasco, which premiered in 2010. She played Iris Rojas, a woman who supports the Chilean military dictatorship, and won the 2011 Altazor Award for best theater actress for the role. Patricia Espinosa of Ámbito Financiero saw a performance at the Buenos Aires International Festival in 2011, and praised Urrutia's physical expressiveness, comic timing and transitions between emotions, while criticizing aspects of the staging. Urrutia reprised the role in a 2022 production at Teatro Biobío, alongside actors from the local area.

In the television miniseries Ecos del desierto (2013), directed by Andrés Wood, she and Castro played a married couple in a military household. She won a Caleuche Award for supporting actress for the series Sudamerican Rockers in 2016, and won the Pedro Sienna Award for leading actress for Camaleón in 2017. Reviewing Camaleón, Antonella Estévez of Cinechile praised the nuanced performances of Urrutia, Paula Zúñiga and Gastón Salgado, while arguing that the screenplay failed to establish a strong connection between the audience and the characters.

In May 2017 the board of the Círculo de Periodistas (Circle of Journalists) appointed Urrutia artistic director of Santiago's Teatro Camilo Henríquez, succeeding Ramón Griffero. She had performed there in Prometeo, el origen in 2015 and, at the time of her appointment, was appearing in 99 La Morgue and La amante fascista there. She said she intended to continue the theater's work with younger companies and retain the programming established by her predecessor. In 2018, she starred in La iguana de Alessandra, a comedy written for her by Griffero, in which her character travels through different periods of twentieth-century history. Evelyn Briceño of La Tercera praised Urrutia's versatility in moving between comedy and drama, as well as her dancing.

During the COVID-19 pandemic, she performed in Mentes salvajes over Zoom before returning to live performances. In an interview with CNN Chile, she criticized the use of competitive grants during the pandemic that she felt had made cultural workers compete with one another and argued that public support could have helped theaters remain active. She received the 2025 Caleuche Award for supporting actress in a series for playing La Buitre in Baby Bandito.

In 2025, after twenty years away from Canal 13, she returned to the network in the vertical telenovela El obrero que me enamoró while in treatment for breast cancer. In 2026 she returned to the stage in Proyecto Villa and in a revival of Los invasores at the Teatro Nacional Chileno. She appeared in Manuela Martelli's El deshielo (2026).

== Personal life and documentary ==
Urrutia and documentary filmmaker Augusto Góngora began a relationship in 1997; they started living together in 2000 and married in 2016. After his diagnosis with Alzheimer's disease in 2014, she cared for him while continuing her career. Góngora died on May 19, 2023.

Maite Alberdi filmed the couple for The Eternal Memory, a documentary released in 2023. It follows Urrutia and Góngora's life together after his diagnosis with Alzheimer's disease. Urrutia recorded some of the material herself during the pandemic. In a 2024 interview, she said she had initially been reluctant to participate and had not seen the completed film until after its Sundance Film Festival premiere. The film received the World Cinema Grand Jury Prize for documentary at the 2023 Sundance Film Festival. It was also nominated for the Academy Award for Best Documentary Feature Film in 2024.

In October 2024, Urrutia said in a television interview that she had been diagnosed with triple-negative breast cancer and had been in treatment since late August.

== Filmography and performances ==
=== Film ===
Film appearances
Year	Film	Role	Director	Ref.
1993	Johnny 100 Pesos	Paty	Gustavo Graef Marino	
1995	La rubia de Kennedy		Arnaldo Valsecchi	
1996	El encierro		Marcelo Ferrari	
1999	No tan lejos de Andrómeda		Juan Vicente Araya	
2001	La tercera oreja		Nicolás Acuña	
2003	Carga vital	Julia's daughter, 30 years later	Sebastián Lelio	
2004	Cachimba	Lucy	Silvio Caiozzi	
2005	Play	Nurse	Alicia Scherson	
2006	Fuga	Macarena	Pablo Larraín	
2007	Tendida mirando las estrellas	Nieves Carrasco	Andrés Racz	
2016	Camaleón		Jorge Riquelme Serrano	
2016	La gravedad del púgil		Jorge Mella	
2016	Prueba de actitud		Augusto Matte and Fabrizio Copano	
2017	La rima de la última fila		Claudio Figueroa	
2020	Tengo miedo torero	Doña Clarita	Rodrigo Sepúlveda	
2021	Un lugar llamado dignidad		Matías Rojas Valencia	
2022	Mujeres bajo Saturno		María Paz Venegas	
2023	The Eternal Memory	Herself	Maite Alberdi	
2023	Historia y geografía	Francisca Pallazo	Bernardo Quesney	
2024	Isla Negra	Carmen	Jorge Riquelme Serrano	
2024	Ürsula		Edison Cájas	
2026	El deshielo	Techa	Manuela Martelli	

=== Telenovelas ===
Telenovela appearances
Premiere year	Title	Role	Channel or platform	Ref.
1990	El milagro de vivir	Elcira Troncoso	TVN	
1991	Volver a empezar	Nancy Jara	TVN	
1992	Trampas y caretas	Doris Machuca	TVN	
1993	Jaque mate	Paula Quesney	TVN	
1994	Champaña	Marly	Canal 13	
1995	El amor está de moda	Soledad	Canal 13	
1996	Marrón Glacé, el regreso	Rosita Monarde	Canal 13	
1997	Eclipse de luna		Canal 13	
1998	Amándote	Nelly	Canal 13	
1999	Fuera de control	Sarita Mellafe	Canal 13	
2000	Sabor a ti	Lucero del Campo	Canal 13	
2001	Piel canela	María Conejo	Canal 13	
2003	Puertas adentro	Sofía	TVN	
2004	Tentación	Dominga Jiménez	Canal 13	
2005	Gatas y tuercas	Brenda Lillo	Canal 13	
2017	Dime quién fue	Eliana Bustos	TVN	
2019	Amar a morir	Rita	TVN	
2025	El obrero que me enamoró	Sara Salinas	Canal 13's digital platforms	

=== TV series ===
Television series appearances
Year	Title	Role	Channel or platform	Ref.
1989	Teresa de los Andes	Juana Fernández Solar	TVN	
2005	Casados		Chilevisión	
2011	Prófugos	Adriana Bascuñán	HBO	
2013	Ecos del desierto	Inés	Chilevisión	
2014	Sudamerican Rockers	Carmen	Chilevisión	
2014	Pulseras rojas	Dr. Andrade	TVN	
2015	Juana Brava	Hilda	TVN	
2017	12 días que estremecieron Chile		Chilevisión	
2018	Casa de Angelis	Gladys Soto	TVN	
2021	No nos quieren ver	Fernanda Salazar	Mega	
2022	Celeste	Maruja	NTV	
2023	Casado con hijos	Pilar	Mega	
2024	Baby Bandito	La Buitre	Netflix	
2024	Vencer o morir		Prime Video	

=== Theater ===
Theater appearances
Year(s)	Production	Author	Role	Director	Venue	Ref.
1987	Esperando la carroza	Jacobo Langsner		Raúl Osorio		
1989–1990	La manzana de Adán	Alfredo Castro, based on work by Claudia Donoso and Paz Errázuriz		Alfredo Castro		
1992, 2010	Historia de la sangre	Alfredo Castro; texts by Francesca Lombardo, Rodrigo Pérez and Castro	La Chica del Peral	Alfredo Castro	Sala Nuval (1992); Teatro La Memoria (2010)	
1993–1994	Los días tuertos	Claudia Donoso (source text)		Alfredo Castro	Sala Nuval	
1996	El seductor	Benjamín Galemiri		Alejandro Goic	Sala Agustín Siré	
1996–1997	La misión	Heiner Müller		Alexander Stillmark	Goethe-Institut, Santiago (1996); Berliner Ensemble (1997)	
1998	Santa Juana de los mataderos	Bertolt Brecht		Alexander Stillmark		
2000	Cinema Utoppia	Ramón Griffero	Ella	Ramón Griffero	Teatro San Ginés	
2001	Todos saben quién fue	Alejandro Moreno		Ramón Griffero	Teatro San Ginés	
2002	Devastados	Sarah Kane		Alfredo Castro	Matucana 100	
2003, 2012	Tus deseos en fragmentos	Ramón Griffero	Various roles	Ramón Griffero	Matucana 100; Teatro Ladrón de Bicicletas (2012)	
2005	Éxtasis o la senda de la santidad	Ramón Griffero		Ramón Griffero	Sala Camilo Mori	
2010, 2022	La amante fascista	Alejandro Moreno	Iris Rojas	Víctor Carrasco	Teatro Biobío; CEINA (2022)	
2014–2015	Prometeo, el origen	Ramón Griffero		Ramón Griffero	GAM (2014); Teatro Camilo Henríquez (2015)	
2016–2017	99 La Morgue	Ramón Griffero		Ramón Griffero	Teatro Camilo Henríquez	
2018	La iguana de Alessandra	Ramón Griffero	Alessandra	Ramón Griffero	Sala Antonio Varas, Teatro Nacional Chileno	
2019, 2023, 2026	Proyecto Villa	Daniela Contreras López and Edison Cájas	Various roles	Daniela Contreras López and Edison Cájas	GAM	
2020, 2022	Mentes salvajes	Marcus Lindeen	Ana	Víctor Carrasco	Zoom, produced by GAM (2020); CEINA (2022)	
2021	Baviera	Daniela Contreras López and Edison Cájas		Daniela Contreras López and Edison Cájas	Online, through Escenario Compartido	
2022	La infancia es la casa que habitaremos para siempre	Carla Zúñiga		Víctor Carrasco	CEINA	
2026	Los invasores	Egon Wolff	Pietá	Marcelo Leonart	Sala Antonio Varas, Teatro Nacional Chileno	

Theater directing credits
Year	Production	Author	Urrutia's credit	Venue	Ref.
2005	Chita que es linda mi tierra		Director		
2025	La directora	Paulina Urrutia	Playwright and director	Sala Arrau, Teatro Municipal de Santiago	

=== Music videos ===
Year	Title	Artist	Ref.
2017	"Para ser aceptada"	Martina Lecaros	

== Awards ==
Acting awards
Year	Award	Category	Work	Ref.
1990	Asociación de Periodistas de Espectáculos	Best television actress	—	
1993	Asociación de Periodistas de Espectáculos	Best film actress	Johnny 100 Pesos	
2000	Altazor Award	Best television actress	Fuera de control	
2003	Altazor Award	Best theater actress	Devastados	
2007	Festival del cinema latino americano, Trieste	Best performance	Tendida mirando las estrellas	
2011	Altazor Award	Best theater actress	La amante fascista	
2016	Caleuche Awards	Supporting actress in a series	Sudamerican Rockers	
2017	Pedro Sienna Awards	Leading actress	Camaleón	
2025	Caleuche Awards	Supporting actress in a series	Baby Bandito	
