= USCGC Vigilant (WMEC-617) =

U.S. Coast Guard cutter

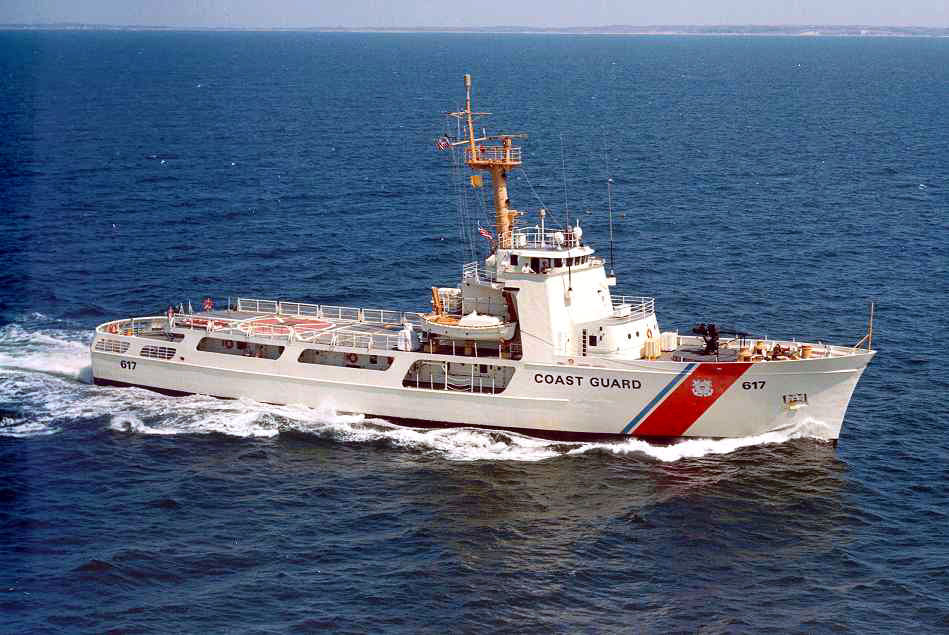
- USCGC Vigilant (WMEC-617)

History

United States
- Builder: Todd Shipyards, Houston, Texas
- Commissioned: October 3, 1964
- Home port: Port Canaveral, Florida
- Identification: MMSI number: 367293000; Callsign: NHIC
- Motto: Semper Vigilans; (Always Vigilant)
- Status: Active
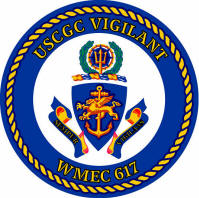
- Badge

General characteristics
- Displacement: 759 tons
- Length: 210 ft 6 in (64.16 m)
- Beam: 34 ft (10 m)
- Draft: 10 ft 6 in (3.20 m) max
- Propulsion: 2 x V16 2550 horsepower ALCO diesel engines
- Speed: max 18 knots; 2,700 mile range
- Range: cruise 14 knots; 6,100 mile range
- Complement: 12 officers, 63 enlisted
- Sensors & processing systems: 2 x AN/SPS-64
- Armament: 1 × Mk 38 25mm autocannon; 2 × M2HB .50 caliber machine gun
- Aircraft carried: HH-65 Dolphin

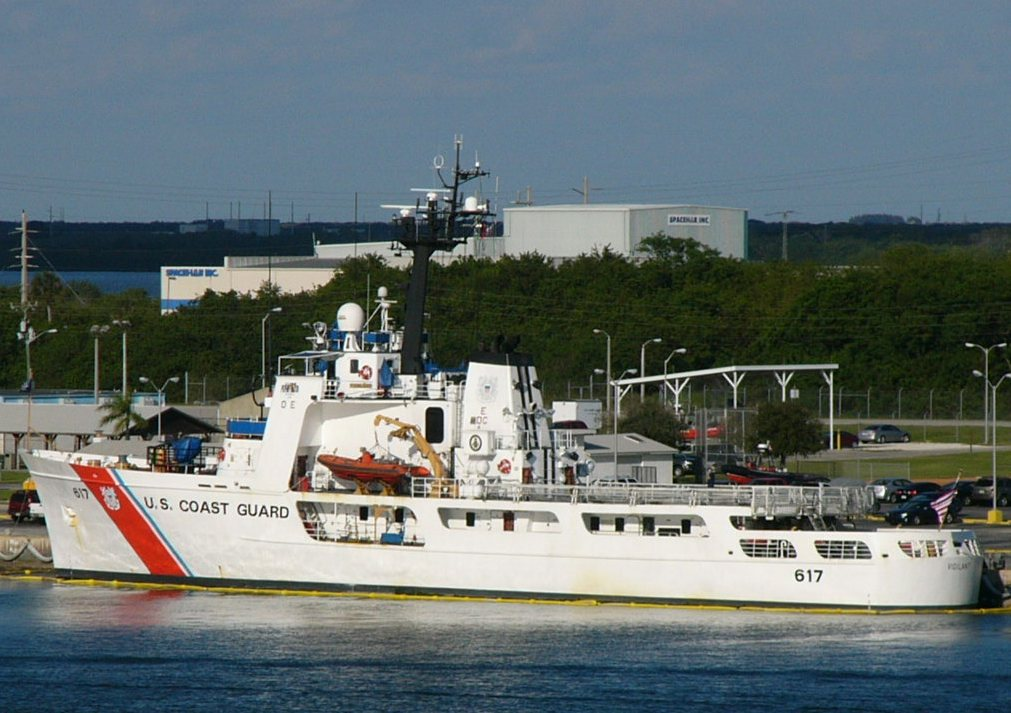
U.S. Coast Guard Cutter Vigilant docked in Port Canaveral, Florida in 2008.

USCGC Vigilant (WMEC-617) is a United States Coast Guard medium endurance cutter. She is the twelfth cutter to bear the name Vigilant, dating back to 1790 when the original Vigilant was built for the United States Revenue-Marine. She was commissioned on October 3, 1964, at Todd Shipyards in Houston, Texas, at a cost of 2.3 million dollars. From 1964 through 1989 Vigilant was homeported in New Bedford, Massachusetts at Coast Guard Station New Bedford. In 1989, she underwent an 18-month Major Maintenance Availability in order to modernize her capabilities. In 1990, Vigilant moved her homeport to Port Canaveral, Florida. In 2006 Vigilant completed another yard period, updating her with the most modern electronic and engineering equipment available.

== Kudirka incident ==
On November 23, 1970, Simonas "Simas" Kudirka, a Soviet seaman of Lithuanian origin, leapt from the 400-foot (120 m) mother ship Sovetskaya Litva, anchored in U.S. waters near Aquinnah, Massachusetts, on Martha's Vineyard, aboard Vigilant, sailing from New Bedford, Massachusetts. The Soviets accused Kudirka of theft of 3,000 rubles from the ship's safe. Ten hours passed. After attempts to get the U.S. State Department to provide guidance failed, Rear Admiral William B. Ellis, commander of the First Coast Guard District, ordered Commander Ralph E. Eustis to return Kudirka to the Soviets. Commander Eustis refused to subject his own crew to the task and instead permitted a detachment of Soviet seamen to board the Vigilant to return Kudirka to the Soviet ship. (The engineering crew had offered to hide Kudirka in the engine air intake shaft which could not be opened while the engines were running but the offer was declined.) This led to a change in asylum policy by the U.S. Coast Guard. Admiral Ellis and his chief of staff were given administrative punishment under Article 15 of the UCMJ. Commander Eustis was given a non-punitive letter of reprimand and assigned to shore duty.

Subsequent investigations revealed that Kudirka could claim American citizenship through his mother and was allowed to come to the United States in 1974.

A book detailing the incident, Day of Shame, by Algis Ruksenas, was published in 1973. The book helped spur further investigations into the incident that eventually led to Kudirka's release by the Soviets. It remains part of the reading curriculum in the U.S. Coast Guard Academy.

The incident was portrayed in a 1978 television movie, The Defection of Simas Kudirka, with Alan Arkin playing Kudirka and Donald Pleasence playing the captain of the Soviet ship. In the movie, the USCGC Decisive (WMEC 629) played the part of the Vigilant.

The incident is also portrayed in a 2020 documentary film The Jump directed by Giedrė Žickytė, with Simonas Kudirka as himself and Ralph E. Eustis as himself.

== Notable crew ==
- Thomas H. Collins, served as Commandant of the Coast Guard from 2002 to 2006.
- Andre Douglas, NASA astronaut
