= Chameleon (2016 film) =

- Official poster (Chile)
- Camaleón
- Directed by: Jorge Riquelme Serrano
- Written by: Jorge Riquelme Serrano
- Produced by: Jorge Riquelme Serrano; Karla Kri; Sandra Del Valle Casals; Daniel Díaz
- Starring: Gastón Salgado; Paula Zúñiga; Paulina Urrutia; Alejandro Goic
- Cinematography: Cristián Petit-Laurent
- Edited by: Valeria Hernández
- Music by: Carlos Cabezas
- Production company: Laberinto Films
- Release date: September 29, 2016
- Running time: 82 minutes
- Country: Chile
- Language: Spanish

Chameleon (Spanish: Camaleón) is a 2016 Chilean psychological thriller film written and directed by Jorge Riquelme Serrano. It had its world premiere at the 2016 BFI London Film Festival where it was selected to compete for the Sutherland Award (first feature competition).

== Plot ==
Chameleon is a psychological thriller that chronicles Paula and Paulina's last day together at their summer home. Their intimate farewell is disrupted by the arrival of an unexpected guest, which leads to a shocking transformation, exposing the darkest corners of the human mind.

== Cast ==
- Gastón Salgado as Gastón
- Paulina Urrutia as Paulina
- Paula Zúñiga as Paula
- Alejandro Goic as Franco

== Release ==
Chameleon had its domestic Chilean premiere on 25 August 2016 at the Santiago International Film Festival (SANFIC) ahead of its theatrical release across Chile on the 29 September 2016. It went on to have its International Premiere on 9 October 2016 at the 2016 BFI London Film Festival, where it was nominated for the Sutherland Award in the first feature competition. It went on to have its North American premiere at the 2017 Seattle International Film Festival where it was selected for the Ibero-American competition. It was also selected for international festivals including the Lima Film Festival's official fiction competition, Havana Film Festival, Yucatán and Mérida Film Festival's Latin American first feature competition where it received a Special Jury Mention, Hidalgo International Film Festival of the Americas' LGBT and first feature competition where Gastón Salgado received the best actor award and the Latin American Film Festival of Rotterdam (FLAR).

== Reception ==
=== Accolades ===
Chameleon received 11 nominations at the 2017 Pedro Sienna Chilean film awards for Best Film, Best Director, Best Leading Actress (Paulina Urrutia and Paula Zúñiga), Best Leading Actor (Gastón Salgado), Best Script, Best Editing, Best Original Music (Carlos Cabezas), Best Special Effects, Best Costume and Best Make-up. It won three awards for Best Director, Best Leading Actress (Paulina Urrutia) and Best Original Music (Carlos Cabezas).
