= Simas Kudirka =

Lithuanian sailor (1930–2023)

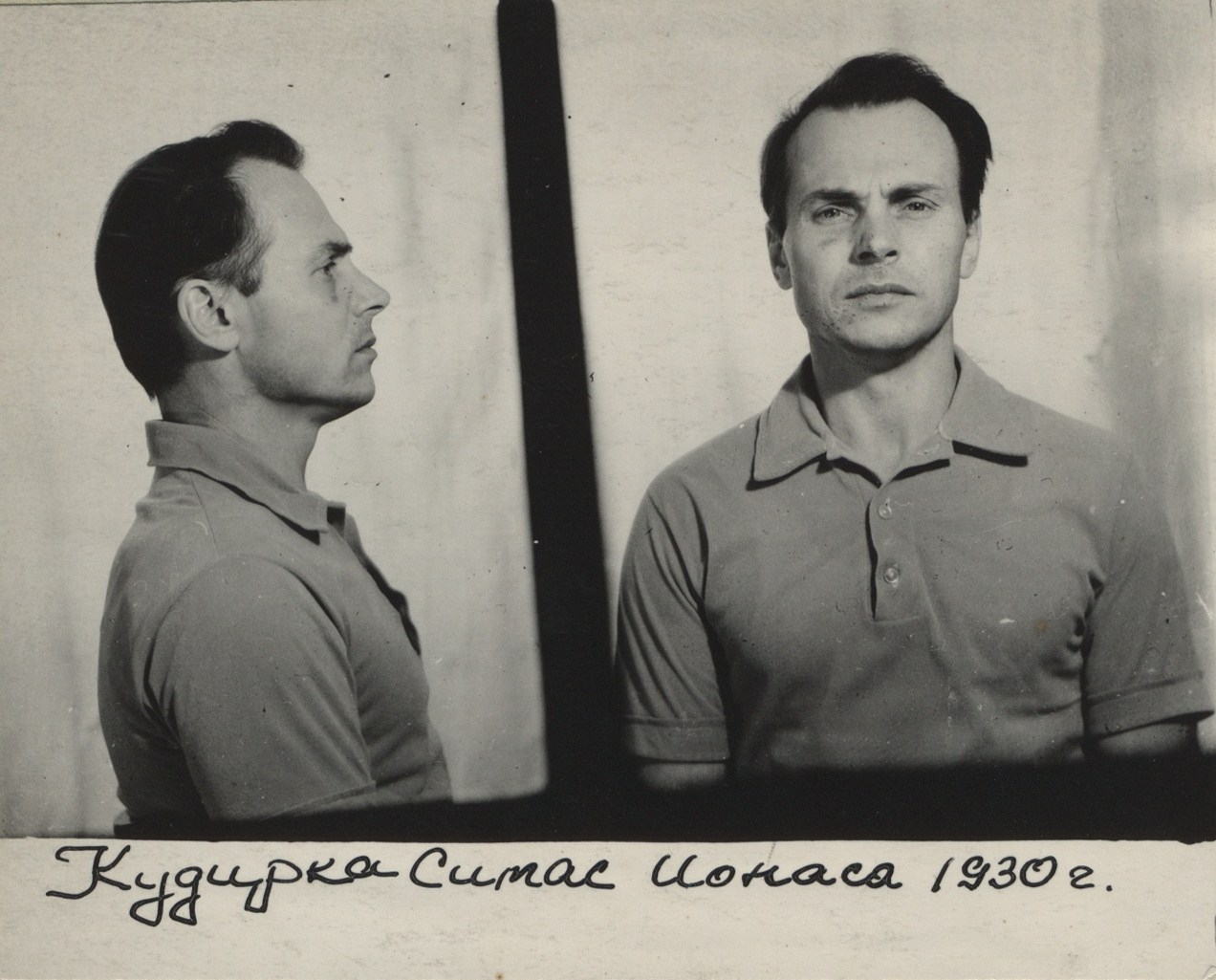
- KGB prison photo
- Born: 9 April 1930; Griškabūdis, Lithuania
- Died: 11 February 2023 (aged 92); Pilviškiai, Lithuania
- Education: Lithuanian Maritime Academy
- Occupation: Sailor

Simas Kudirka (9 April 1930 – 11 February 2023) was a Lithuanian sailor. He is best known for the attempted defection from the Soviet Union in 1970 and subsequent activism against the Soviet regime in Lithuania. An important outcome of the incident was the creation of the improved guidelines for handling defections by American officials.

== Biography ==
Born in Griškabūdis on 9 April 1930, Kudirka graduated from the Lithuanian Maritime Academy in 1952. He worked as a radio operator on various ships from 1956 to 1970. He was denied promotions due to his refusal to join the Communist Party. On 23 November 1970, during bilateral negotiations between the United States and the Soviet Union regarding fishing rights, he jumped from his ship, the trawler Sovetskaya Litva ('Soviet Lithuania'), onto the American Coast Guard cutter, the USCGC Vigilant (WMEC-617). He requested political asylum, but he was detained, beaten, and forcibly returned to the Soviet ship by Soviet troops who had been let on board by the Americans.

Actions by U.S. and Soviet officials were condemned by American news sources, particularly the Voice of America. President Richard Nixon was angered by the incident, because of the violation of the procedure for defections. After that three high officers associated with the incident were relieved from duty. A more important outcome was the creation of the new guidelines for handling defections, which made the standing procedures more specific to ensure that similar situations would not happen again.

In May 1971, Kudirka was sentenced to 10 years of correctional labour camps and he served his time in camps in Pskov Oblast and at Potma in Mordovia. His mother, who had been born in the United States, confirmed her U.S. citizenship despite Soviet interference, and Kudirka managed to secure release from imprisonment in 1974. He moved to the United States with his family and gave lectures about the communist regime in Lithuania. He returned to Lithuania in 2000, ten years after the country's independence.

Kudirka died in Pilviškiai on 11 February 2023, at the age of 92.

== Honors ==
- Commander of the Order of the Cross of Vytis (2008)

== Works about Kudirka ==
Several books and films have been produced about the life and story of Kudirka:

- Simas (1971) – book written by Jurgis Gliauda
- Day of Shame (1973) – book written by Algis Rukšėnas
- Simas Kudirka in Chicago (1974) – film directed by Algimantas Kezys
- The Defection of Simas Kudirka (1978) – US television film starring starring Alan Arkin as Kudirka; the film won two Emmys
- For Those Still at Sea (1978) – book written by Kudirka and Lawrence E. Eichel
- The Jump (2020) – Lithuanian documentary film
