= Augusto Góngora =

Chilean journalist (1952–2023)

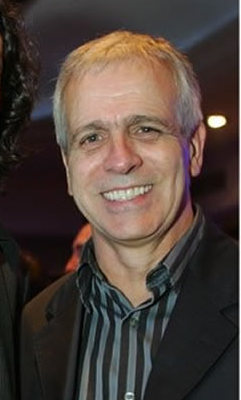
- Born: January 2, 1952
- Died: May 19, 2023 (aged 71)
- Resting place: Parque del Recuerdo
- Education: Pontifical Catholic University of Chile
- Occupations: Journalist; Filmmaker
- Years active: 1976–2023
- Employer: TVN (1990–2010; 2016–2017)
- Spouses: Patricia Neut; Paulina Urrutia (m. 2016)
- Children: 2

Augusto José Góngora Labbé (2 January 1952 – 19 May 2023) was a Chilean journalist, filmmaker and television presenter. After working in independent media during the military dictatorship in Chile, he went on to work for the country's national broadcaster, Televisión Nacional de Chile, from 1990 until 2010, primarily focusing on cultural programming. After leaving the channel, Góngora went on to serve on TVN's board of directors between 2016 and 2017.

== Career ==
After completing high school at the Liceo de Aplicación in Santiago, Góngora went on to study journalism at the Pontifical Catholic University of Chile. During the military dictatorship under Augusto Pinochet, Góngora worked for independent media outlets that opposed the regime, including in 1976 serving as the editor of Solidaridad, a magazine published by the Vicariate of Solidarity, a human rights organisation that offered support to victims of the Pinochet regime and their families. During this time, Góngora also hosted the alternative news programme Teleanálisis, which aimed circumvent the military dictatorship's strict censorship laws. Góngora worked as an editor for Teleanálisis between 1984 and 1986, before becoming its director from 1986 until 1989.

On 11 March 1990, Chile started its transition back to a democracy, and Góngora subsequently joined the state broadcaster, Televisión Nacional de Chile. On 12 and 13 October 1990, Góngora hosted two charity concerts, Desde Chile... un abrazo a la esperanza, organised by Amnesty International to mark the end of the Pinochet regime and the transition to democracy, at the Estadio Nacional in Santiago.

Góngora subsequently started hosting and producing cultural content for TVN, including hosting the cultural programme Cine video (later rebranded as Cine video + teatro) until 2002. In 1993, he became TVN's cultural editor, a position he held until he left the channel in 2010. He directed multiple programmes for the channel, including El mirador (1991–2004), which focused on social issues; and El show de los libros (1992–2002), which focused on Chilean literature. Góngora also hosted programmes, including Coyote (2003) and Hora 25 (2006–2010), a cultural panel show.

In 2007, Góngora served as an executive producer on the folklore-based miniseries La Recta Provincia, created by Raúl Ruiz, as well as Ruiz's follow-up series, Litoral (2008); he also had a small acting role in the former. Góngora also hosted the radio programme Concert Enfoque on the radio station Radio Concierto.

After leaving TVN in 2010, in August 2016 Góngora was nominated by Michelle Bachelet, the President of Chile, to serve as one of its directors. After being approved by the Senate, Góngora took up the role. He resigned from the board in 2017, citing health reasons.

In addition to his media work, Góngora also worked in academia, including at the Pontifical Catholic University of Chile, the University of Chile, Andrés Bello National University, and Finis Terrae University.

== Personal life ==
Góngora's first marriage was to Patricia Neut, with whom he had two children, Javiera and Cristóbal. In 1997, he began a romantic relationship with actress Paulina Urrutia. On 17 June 2016, Góngora and Urrutia married.

== Illness and death ==
Góngora was diagnosed with Alzheimer's disease in 2014, when he was 62. His health declined during the subsequent years, and in September 2020 his wife announced that he was showing symptoms of dementia. Góngora was hospitalised for most of April 2022 due to his worsening health.

On 17 May 2023, Góngora was reported to have entered into a state of sopor. He died on 19 May, at the age of 71, with his death being announced later that day by the Centro Cultural Gabriela Mistral. Following a funeral procession that passed the headquarters of TVN in Providencia, Góngora was buried at the Parque del Recuerdo in Santiago.

== Legacy ==
In 2023, the documentary The Eternal Memory premiered at the 2023 Sundance Film Festival. The film, directed by Maite Alberdi, followed Góngora and Urrutia's marriage following his diagnosis with Alzheimer's disease. The Eternal Memory received critical acclaim, and was dedicated to Góngora's memory. The film was nominated for an Academy Award for Best Documentary Feature.
