= Francisca Merino =

Chilean actress and television presenter

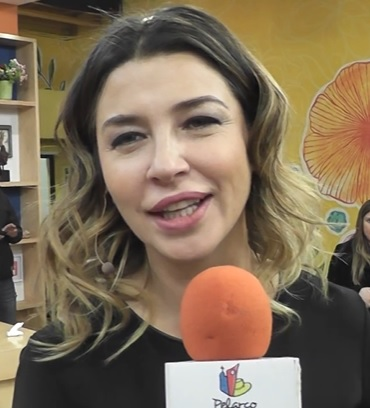
- Francisca Merino en 2016
- Born: María Francisca Rosa Merino Garrido; 9 May 1973 (age 53); Santiago, Chile
- Other name: Pancha Merino
- Education: Saint John's Villa Academy, Santiago
- Occupations: Actress, television presenter
- Years active: 1995–present
- Spouse: Claudio Labbé (2001–2016)

María Francisca Rosa Merino Garrido (born 9 May 1973), known as Pancha Merino, is a Chilean actress and television presenter. Her most prominent roles have been on Canal 13 series, including Adrenalina, Playa Salvaje and Cerro Alegre.

== Biography ==
Francisca Merino started appearing in commercials at age 14 and has been financially independent ever since. She studied theater at the schools of Gustavo Meza in Chile and Juan Carlos Corazza in Spain.

She made her acting debut in 1995 on the Canal 13 telenovela Amor a domicilio, but she achieved greater popularity the following year when she portrayed Cathy Winter, the protagonist of Adrenalina.

In 1999, she starred with Jorge Zabaleta in the TV series Cerro Alegre, playing Beatriz León Thompson, a young upper-class woman in the city of Viña del Mar.

In theater she joined the cast of Te vas a morir de pena cuando yo no esté, one of the most notable productions of the 2002 Santiago a Mil International Theater Festival. This was written by Pablo Illanes, with Andrés Gómez in the other leading role. She would return to work with both of them in the 2011 play Infierno Beach.

In 2005 she appeared in the film The Last Moon by director Miguel Littín, where she was a castmate of Alejandro Goic and Tamara Acosta.

Merino's extroverted personality led to her being a frequent guest on television programs. But it was only in 2008 that she agreed to work on a series: SQP. Appearing on the variety show exposed a side of her that often drew laughter but also controversy. After spending six years on Chilevisión, where she was also a juror of the Viña del Mar Festival, her contract was not renewed.

In December 2015, after being away from television, the morning show Bienvenidos, led by Tonka Tomicic and Martín Cárcamo, recruited her to be a panelist. She said she accepted that proposal because a morning show is a friendly format and is not exposed to the discussions that often occur in an entertainment show.

Although Chilevisión decided to let her go in 2014, in 2016 she was called on to reinforce Maldita moda due to the lukewarm ratings that it was receiving. In an unprecedented event in the television industry, Merino, with a contract on Canal 13, managed to work on two channels at the same time.

== Personal life ==
Francisca Merino is a Buddhist, and took refuge in the Three Jewels on a trip to India. She asserts that in show business she represents a "character", and that in her personal life she is not like that. In 2001 Merino married commercial engineer Claudio Labbé, from whom she separated in 2016. She has three children: Dominic, Amanda (goddaughter of screenwriter Pablo Illanes), and Chloé (goddaughter of actor Andrés Gómez).

== Controversy ==
On 9 April 2014, the SQP program discussed the performance of singer Ana Tijoux at the Lollapalooza festival, where some young people in the audience shouted cara de nana (housemaid face) to the artist. When it was Francisca Merino's turn to comment on the news, she said "Nana's face, but pretty." This drew the anger of comedian Pedro Ruminot, SQP's guest that day, who questioned her for what she had just said. Merino replied "you are angry because you are also dark. Better bring me a little cup of coffee." As a result, Chilevisión received 275 complaints with the National Television Council. Later the actress was suspended for more than a week of television, and on her return to SQP on 15 May 2014, she made public apologies, saying it was a bad joke. However, Chilevisión was reprimanded in August for "prejudices of a social nature". In the end, Merino did not continue on Chilevisión and said she did not want to return to the show.

== Filmography ==
=== Film ===
Year	Title	Role	Director
2003	The Chosen One	Celina	Nacho Argiró & Gabriel López
2005	The Last Moon	Alinne	Miguel Littín
2007	Normal con alas	Rosario Balmaceda	Coca Gómez
2008	Lokas	Dream woman	Gonzalo Justiniano
2011	Baby Shower	Claudia	Pablo Illanes

=== Series and specials ===
Year	Title	Role	Channel
2002	La vida es una lotería	Jenny	TVN

=== Telenovelas ===
Year	Title	Role	Channel
1995	El amor está de moda	Marcela Stuardo	Canal 13
1995	Amor a domicilio	Sofía Garrido	Canal 13
1996	Adrenalina	Cathy Winter	Canal 13
1997	Playa salvaje	Camila Aguirre	Canal 13
1999	Cerro Alegre	Beatriz Thompson	Canal 13
2001	Corazón pirata	Fátima Saud	Canal 13
2004	Hippie	Florencia Risopatrón	Canal 13

=== Programs ===
Year	Title	Role	Channel
2006	Gente como tú	Host	Chilevisión
2006–2014	SQP	Commentator	Chilevisión
2009–2011	Fiebre de baile	Co-presenter	Chilevisión
2013	Viña del Mar Festival	Juror	Chilevisión
2014	El elegido	Judge	Chilevisión
2014	Primer Plano	Commentator	Chilevisión
2015–present	Bienvenidos	Panelist	Canal 13
2016	La divina comida	Host participant	Chilevisión
2016	Maldita moda	Guest panelist	Chilevisión
