= A Child of My Own =

2026 documentary film

- Netflix release poster
- Spanish: Un hijo propio
- Directed by: Maite Alberdi
- Written by: Julián Loyola; Esteban Student
- Produced by: Sandra Godinez; Carla González Vargas; Maximiliano Sanguine
- Cinematography: Ignacio Miranda
- Edited by: Carolina Siraqyan
- Production company: Gato Grande
- Distributed by: Netflix
- Release dates: 14 February 2026 (Berlinale); 30 July 2026 (Mexico)
- Running time: 96 minutes
- Country: Mexico
- Language: Spanish

A Child of My Own (Spanish: Un hijo propio) is a 2026 Mexican hybrid documentary film directed by Maite Alberdi, written by Julián Loyola and Esteban Student. It follows Alejandra, a newly married woman who desires to become a mother and facing pressure, fakes becoming pregnant.

The film had its world premiere in the Berlinale Special section of the 76th Berlin International Film Festival on 14 February 2026. It was released theatrically in Mexico on 30 July 2026, and was released globally on Netflix on 13 August 2026.

== Premise ==
Eleonor Alejandra Marín Mendoza faces pressure to become a mother from her husband and in-laws, leading her to fake becoming pregnant.

== Release ==
It had its world premiere at the 76th Berlin International Film Festival on 14 February 2026, in the Berlinale Special section. It also screened at CPH:DOX, Full Frame Documentary Film Festival, San Francisco International Film Festival, Visions du Réel, and DC/DOX Film Festival. It was theatrically released in Mexico on 30 July 2026, and in the United States on 7 August 2026, before streaming worldwide on Netflix on 13 August 2026.
