= Coast Guard Station New Bedford =

Defunct United States Coast Guard station

Coast Guard Detachment New Bedford
- New Bedford, Massachusetts

Site information
- Type: Coast Guard Detachment
- Owner: United States Coast Guard
- Controlled by: 1st District
- Open to the public: Yes

Location
- Coordinates: 41°38′4.41″N 70°55′11.24″W

Site history
- In use: 1867 - 2003

United States Coast Guard Station New Bedford was a United States Coast Guard station located in New Bedford, Massachusetts. It was originally as station of the Revenue Cutter Service.

The Revenue Cutter Active was a 90 foot, 120 ton schooner which served at New Bedford from her commissioning in 1867 until she was sold in 1875. She was one of the last strictly sail powered cutters built for the Revenue Cutter Service.

From 1876 to 1900 New Bedford was the home of the School of Instruction of the Revenue Cutter Service, predecessor of the United States Coast Guard Academy.

From 1964 to 1979 the Station was the homeport of the Reliance class cutter Vigilant. Vigilant was replaced by a Famous class cutter.

The station was a sub-unit of Coast Guard Sector Southeast New England located in Coast Guard District One.

The station was closed in 2003 and its assets were relocated.

== See also ==
- List of military installations in Massachusetts
