= The Defection of Simas Kudirka =

- Genre: Drama
- Written by: Bruce Feldman
- Directed by: David Lowell Rich
- Starring: Alan Arkin
- Music by: David Shire
- Country of origin: United States
- Original language: English

Production
- Executive producers: Gerald W. Abrams; Gerald I. Isenberg
- Producers: Richard Briggs; Bruce Sallan
- Production locations: New Castle, New Hampshire; Portsmouth, New Hampshire
- Cinematography: Jacques R. Marquette
- Editor: John A. Martinelli
- Running time: 100 minutes
- Production companies: Paramount Television; The Jozak Company

Original release
- Network: CBS
- Release: January 23, 1978

The Defection of Simas Kudirka is a 1978 American made-for-television drama film based on actual events, featuring Alan Arkin as Simas Kudirka, a Lithuanian merchant seaman who attempts to defect from the Soviet Union to the United States by jumping onto a U.S. Coast Guard cutter. Among the movie's awards are two Emmy wins and three more Emmy nominations. The movie was directed by David Lowell Rich.

== Plot ==
The movie revolves around the true events of a Lithuanian man, Simas Kudirka, who was at the time a radio operator on a Soviet fish processing vessel. When his ship meets at sea with a U.S. Coast Guard cutter near Martha's Vineyard in 1970, Kudirka makes a dramatic leap from the deck, landing on the USCGC Vigilant. He announces that he wishes to defect, but confusion over U.S. policy on defections prevents the Americans from offering him asylum. As the crew of the Vigilant looks on, Soviet officers are allowed to board the cutter, beat and bind Kudirka, and drag him back to the Soviet ship. This tinderbox political incident occurs during a Soviet/U.S. conference over fishing rights.

== Cast ==
- Alan Arkin as Simas Kudirka
- Richard Jordan as Commander Edward Devon
- Donald Pleasence as Vladimir Popov
- George Dzundza as Gruzauskas
- Nicholas Guest as Baltrunar
- Shirley Knight as Genna Kudirka
- John McMartin as Phillip Chadway
- Ted Shackelford as Blain
- Barton Heyman as Dr. Paegle
- Joyce Vining Morgan as Mrs. Paegle
- Jack Blessing as Kabek

== Production ==
The movie was filmed in Portsmouth, New Hampshire, the Portsmouth Naval Shipyard in Kittery, Maine, and off the coast of New Hampshire and southern Maine. The final scene shows Simas Kudirka (Alan Arkin) and his wife Genna (Shirley Knight) reviewing the crew of the Coast Guard cutter Vigilant, the ship onto which Kudirka jumped. The actual ship shown in the movie was the USCGC Decisive at its home port of New Castle, New Hampshire. The TS State of Maine, the training ship of Maine Maritime Academy in Castine, Maine was used as the Russian fish factory ship. Many students at MMA were extras as Russian crewmen.

== Awards ==
In 1978, the movie won two Emmys and was nominated for another three at the 30th Primetime Emmy Awards.

Winners were:

- Outstanding Directing in a Special Program - Drama or Comedy: David Lowell Rich
- Outstanding Film Editing for a Special: John A. Martinelli

The nominated categories and nominees were:

- Outstanding Achievement in Music Composition for a Special (Dramatic Underscore): David Shire
- Outstanding Performance by a Supporting Actor in a Comedy or Drama Special: Donald Pleasence
- Outstanding Writing in a Special Program - Drama or Comedy - Original Teleplay: Bruce Feldman

In 1979, the movie won an "Eddie" from the American Cinema Editors, USA, for Best Edited Television Special, awarded to John A. Martinelli.

== Home media ==
The movie has been released on DVD on-demand format.
