= Family Life (2017 film) =

2017 film

- Film poster
- Directed by: Alicia Scherson; Cristián Jiménez
- Written by: Alejandro Zambra; Alicia Scherson; Cristián Jiménez
- Starring: Jorge Becker
- Release date: 20 January 2017 (Sundance)
- Running time: 80 minutes
- Country: Chile
- Language: Spanish

Family Life (Spanish: Vida de Familia) is a 2017 Chilean drama film directed by Alicia Scherson and Cristián Jiménez. It was screened in the World Cinema Dramatic Competition section of the 2017 Sundance Film Festival.

== Plot ==
A family goes on a trip and leaves their house and cat in the care of Martín, a distant cousin who is over forty years old and disappointed with life. Once settled in the house, he will try to conquer his attractive neighbor Paz, while inventing a fantastic life for himself.

== Cast ==
- Jorge Becker as Martín
- Gabriela Arancibia as Paz
- Blanca Lewin as Consuelo
- Cristián Carvajal as Bruno
