= José Weinstein =

Chilean politician (born 1959)

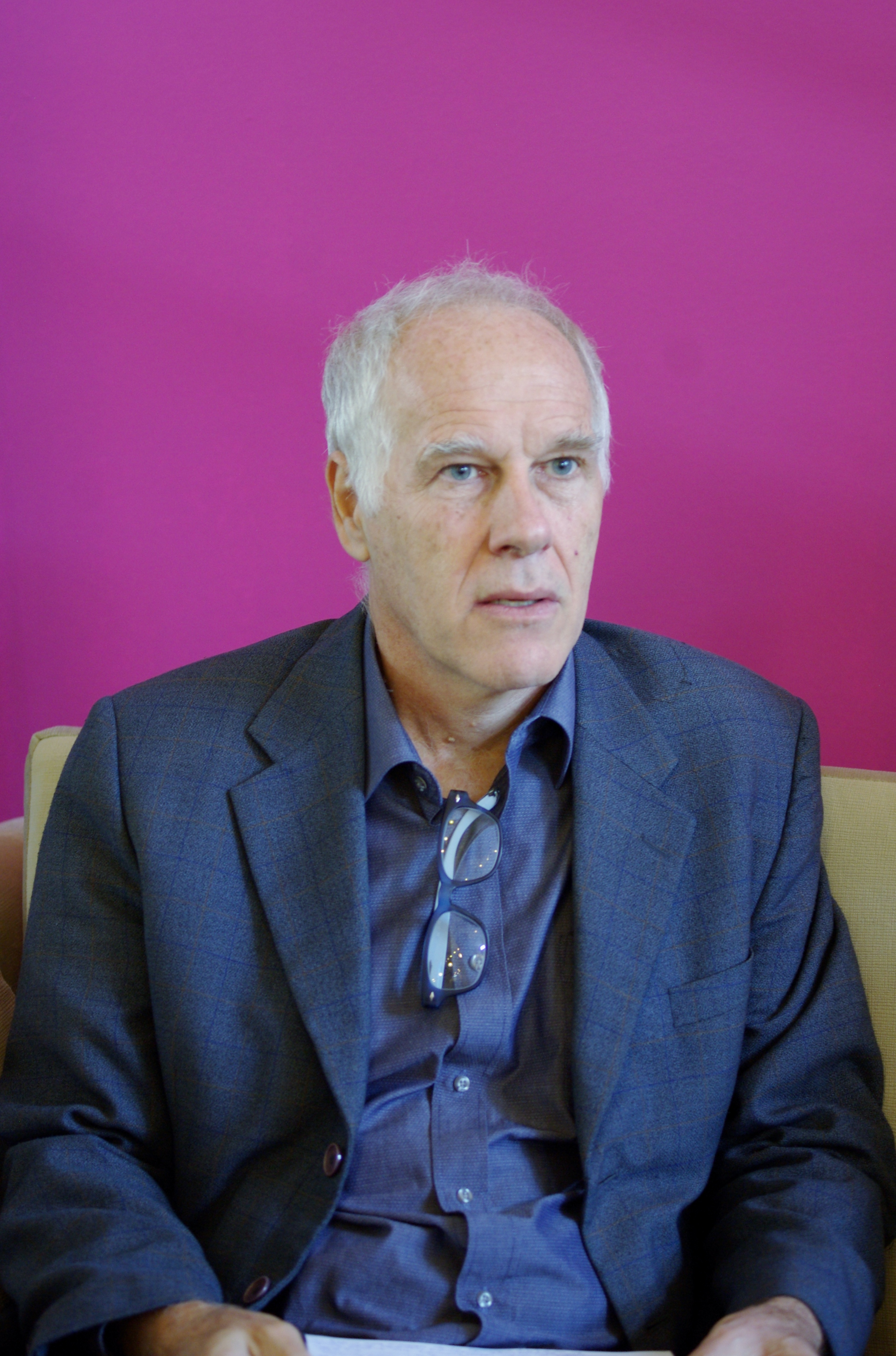
- Weinstein at 2016 FILSA

President of the National Council of Culture and the Arts
- In office 6 August 2003 – 11 March 2006
- President: Ricardo Lagos
- Preceded by: Creation of the position
- Succeeded by: Paulina Urrutia

Undersecretary of Education
- In office 11 March 2000 – 5 March 2003
- President: Ricardo Lagos
- Preceded by: Jaime Pérez de Arce
- Succeeded by: Marigen Hornkohl

Personal details
- Born: 20 September 1959 (age 67) Santiago, Chile
- Party: Party for Democracy (1987−present)
- Spouse: Cecilia Sotomayor
- Children: Three
- Parent(s): Luis Weinstein; María Luisa Cayuela
- Education: University of Chile (B.Sc); Université catholique de Louvain (M.Sc)
- Occupation: Politician; Scholar
- Profession: Sociologist

José David Weinstein Cañuela (born 13 July 1959) is a Chilean politician, sociologist and scholar who served as President of the National Council of Culture and the Arts during Ricardo Lagos' government (2000−2006).

== Early life ==
The son of Chilean-Jewish psychiatrist Luis Weinstein Grenovich and Spanish cardiologist María Luisa Cayuela, he spent his early years in the commune of Ñuñoa, in the Chilean capital, together with his siblings Marisa and Luis.

Raised in an agnostic family, he attended La Girouette School, the Lycée Antoine de Saint-Exupéry de Santiago, the Colegio Nacional de Buenos Aires in Argentina, and the Liceo N.º 1 de Hombres in Santiago. He later studied sociology at the University of Chile, graduating in 1985, and subsequently earned a doctorate in sociology from the Catholic University of Louvain in Belgium in 1990.

He is married to Cecilia Sotomayor, with whom he has three children.

== Public life ==
His career has been closely associated with culture, and particularly with education. Between March 2000 and March 2003, he served as Undersecretary of Education under President Ricardo Lagos. He had previously served as an adviser to Lagos in 1990, when the latter was Minister of Education.

Following the creation of the National Council for Culture and the Arts, Weinstein was appointed by Ricardo Lagos as Chile's first Minister of Culture, taking office in 2003. He remained in the position until the end of the Lagos administration and the inauguration of President Michelle Bachelet.

From March 2006 to April 2013, he served as Executive Director of the Education Programme at Fundación Chile, where he oversaw initiatives related to technology and education, school quality management, and technical assistance for underperforming schools. He has served as a member of the National Education Council, having been appointed in 2012 by President Sebastián Piñera, and as manager of the Centre for Innovation in Education.

He is a former director of the Doctorate in Education programme at the Diego Portales University. He was succeeded by María Teresa Rojas Fabris, an academic at the Alberto Hurtado University. On 17 August 2017, he became Interim Dean of the Faculty of Education at the university, succeeding Natalia Salas, who resigned for personal reasons.

He has also worked as a consultant for organizations including the World Bank, the Economic Commission for Latin America and the Caribbean (ECLAC), the Pan American Health Organization (PAHO), PREALC, the Latin American and Caribbean Economic System (SELA), and the Ministry of Labour and Social Welfare.
