= The Last Moon =

2005 film

- Film poster
- Directed by: Miguel Littín
- Written by: Miguel Littín
- Produced by: Coke Infante
- Starring: Aymann Abuloff
- Cinematography: Miguel Ioann Littin Menz
- Release date: 31 March 2005
- Running time: 105 minutes
- Countries: Chile; Mexico
- Language: Arabic

Last Moon (Spanish: La última luna) is a 2005 Chilean-Mexican drama film directed by Miguel Littín. It was entered into the 27th Moscow International Film Festival.

== Cast ==
- Aymann Abuloff as Solymann
- Tamara Acosta as Matty
- Alejandro Goic as Jacobeo
- Francisca Merino as Alinne
