= The Meltdown (film) =

2026 film by Manuela Martelli

- Chilean theatrical release poster
- Spanish: El deshielo
- Directed by: Manuela Martelli
- Written by: Manuela Martelli
- Produced by: Julio Chavezmontes; Alejandra García; Alex C. Lo; Andrés Wood
- Starring: Maya O'Rourke; Maia Rae Domagala; Saskia Rosendahl; Jakub Gierszał; Paulina Urrutia; Mauricio Pesutic
- Cinematography: Benjamín Echazarreta
- Edited by: Yibrán Asuad
- Music by: Mariá Portugal
- Production companies: Ronda Cine; Cinema Inutile; Wood Producciones
- Distributed by: El Camino Pictures
- Release dates: 14 May 2026 (Cannes); 3 September 2026 (Chile)
- Running time: 108 minutes
- Countries: Chile; United States; Spain; Mexico
- Languages: Spanish; German; English

The Meltdown (Spanish: El deshielo) is a 2026 drama film written and directed by Manuela Martelli. It stars Maya O'Rourke, Maia Rae Domagala, Saskia Rosendahl, Jakub Gierszał and Paulina Urrutia.

The film had its world premiere in the Un Certain Regard section of the 2026 Cannes Film Festival on 14 May. It was theatrically released in Chile by El Camino Pictures on 3 September 2026. It was also selected as the Chilean entry for Best International Feature Film at the 99th Academy Awards.

== Premise ==
In 1992 Chile, a young girl named Inés stays with her grandparents, who own a hotel near a ski resort. She befriends Hanna, a German skier training in Chile, before Hanna disappears.

== Cast ==
- Maya O'Rourke as Inés
- Maia Rae Domagala as Hanna
- Saskia Rosendahl as Lina
- Jakub Gierszał as Alexander
- Paulina Urrutia as Techa
- Mauricio Pesutic as Ricardo

== Production ==
=== Development ===
It is the second installment of a planned trilogy by Martelli about Chile late 20th century history, following 1976 (2022).

The film is produced by Alejandra Garcia at Ronda Cine (Chile); Alex C. Lo at Cinema Inutile (United States); and Andrés Wood at Wood Producciones (Chile); in co-production with Elastica Films (Spain), Piano (Mexico); and Rio Fundación (Chile).

=== Themes ===
The film contains themes of childhood, history, and horror. Martelli stated that her "main interest is going back to history through characters and through their emotions and experiences, instead of addressing history with a capital H".

== Release ==
The Meltdown was selected for the Un Certain Regard section of the 2026 Cannes Film Festival, where it had its world premiere on 14 May. It also made it to the 'Horizontes Latinos' competition of the 74th San Sebastián International Film Festival. The theatrical release in France was set for 26 August 2026.

The film was commercially released on 3 September 2026, in Chilean theaters.

== Reception ==
Sheri Linden of The Hollywood Reporter underscored the film to be "haunted and haunting" in the bottom line.

David Ehrlich of IndieWire gave the "unnerving thriller ", equal parts The Spirit of the Beehive and Picnic at Hanging Rock, a B− rating, pointing out that it rebukes "the notion that a certain amount of collective forgetting is required for a post-fascist country to make way for tomorrow".

On review aggregator website Rotten Tomatoes, the film holds an approval rating of 88% based on 17 reviews, with an average rating of 7.2/10.

== See also ==
- List of submissions to the 99th Academy Awards for Best International Feature Film
- List of Chilean submissions for the Academy Award for Best International Feature Film
