= Giedrė Žickytė =

Lithuanian film director (born 1980)

Giedrė Žickytė (born June 30, 1980) is a Lithuanian film director, producer, documentary film maker.

In 2022 she was awarded the Lithuanian National Prize for Culture and Arts "for a vigorous and impressive creative leap".

She is married to a Lithuanian diplomat Eitvydas Bajarūnas (since 2016).

== Notable filmography ==
- 2009: Baras; documentary about the avant-garde Lithuanian actor and filmmaker Artūras Barysas "Baras". The film won the 2009 "Silver Crane" award for the best TV film
- 2011: How We Played the Revolution; documentary about music of the "Singing Revolution" in Lithuania and the impact on it by the band Antis; the latter started as a joke parodying the Soviet life. Nominated at the 2012 "Silver Crane" awards in the category of the best documentary film
- 2014: Master and Tatiana; documentary about the Lithuanian photographer Vitas Luckus. The film won 4 nominations at the 2015 Silver Crane awards: the best documentary film of the year, the best work of the director of the year, the best work of cinematography, the best work of the director of editing
- 2016: Yo no soy de aquí (I'm Not from Here), co-directed with Maite Alberdi; documentary about a woman in a nursing home who thinks she had just arrived from the Basque Country, Best Documentary Short Film, 11th Pedro Sienna Awards; nominated for the Best Documentary at the 29th European Film Awards
- 2020: The Jump, documentary about the Soviet Lithuanian defector Simas Kudirka; Best Documentary Feature Award at the 36th Warsaw International Film Festival
- 2020: (co-producer) The Earth Is Blue as an Orange, documentary film, directed and written by Iryna Tsilyk; Directing Award in the "World Cinema Documentary" category for the film at the 2020 Sundance Film Festival.
