= Isla Negra (film) =

- Theatrical release poster
- Directed by: Jorge Riquelme Serrano
- Written by: Jorge Riquelme Serrano
- Produced by: Daniela Maldonado; Jorge Riquelme Serrano
- Starring: Alfredo Castro; Paulina Urrutia
- Cinematography: Sergio Armstrong
- Edited by: Jorge Riquelme Serrano; Nicolás Venegas; Valeria Hernández
- Music by: José Miguel Miranda; José Miguel Tobar
- Production company: Laberinto Films
- Distributed by: Market Chile
- Release dates: November 21, 2024 (FILMAR); April 17, 2025 (Chile)
- Running time: 105 minutes
- Country: Chile
- Language: Spanish

Isla Negra (lit. 'Black Island') is a 2024 Chilean social thriller film written, co-produced, co-edited and directed by Jorge Riquelme Serrano. Starring Alfredo Castro and Paulina Urrutia. It is about a real estate developer and his secretary who travel to Isla Negra to oversee the latest developments of an ambitious project, but tensions escalate when a family claims ownership of the place.

== Synopsis ==
In their comfortable beach house in Isla Negra, Guillermo and his assistant Carmen enjoy a weekend while overseeing the final developments of an ambitious real estate project in the area. The tranquility is shattered by the unexpected arrival of a woman, her husband, and her ailing father. From that moment on, their coexistence becomes fraught with tension, unleashing a conflict that brings to light deep political and social differences between the two worlds.

== Cast ==
- Alfredo Castro as Guillermo
- Paulina Urrutia as Carmen
- Gastón Salgado as Jacob
- Marcela Salinas as Marcela
- José Soza as Miguel

== Production ==
Principal photography lasted 7 days in El Quisco, Chile.

== Release ==
Isla Negra had its world premiere on November 21, 2024, at the 25th FILMAR Festival in Latin America, and then screened on November 25, 2024, at the 42n Torino Film Festival. It was commercially released on April 17, 2025, in Chilean theaters.

== Accolades ==
Year	Award / Festival	Category	Recipient	Result	Ref.
2024	25th FILMAR Festival in Latin America	Audience Award FOCUS SUD	Isla Negra	Won	
