= Luciano Cruz-Coke =

Chilean actor and politician (born 1970)

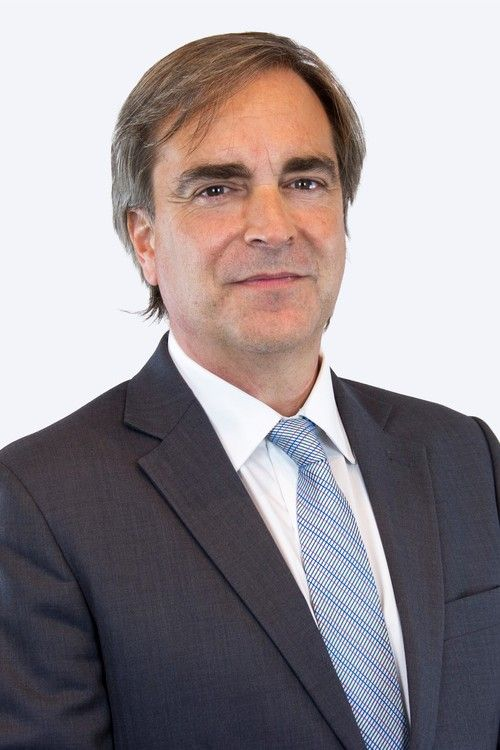
- Official portrait, 2022

Member of the Senate
- Incumbent
- Assumed office 11 March 2022
- Constituency: 7th Circumscription

Member of the Chamber of Deputies
- In office 11 March 2018 – 11 March 2022
- Preceded by: Creation of the district
- Constituency: 10th District

Minister of Culture, Arts and Heritage
- In office 11 March 2010 – 6 June 2013
- President: Sebastián Piñera
- Preceded by: Paulina Urrutia Fernández
- Succeeded by: Roberto Ampuero

Personal details
- Born: 1 July 1970 (age 56) Santiago, Chile
- Party: Independent (2010–2012); Evopoli (2012–present)
- Spouse: Javiera García-Huidobro
- Education: Lee Strasberg Theatre and Film Institute; Academy of Christian Humanism University; University of Chile
- Occupation: Actor, Politician

Luciano Cruz-Coke Carvallo (born 1 July 1970) is a Chilean actor and politician, and was the Minister of Arts and Culture under the 35th President Sebastián Piñera.

As a deputy, he was a member of the Commission on Culture and Communications, and of the Commission on Constitution, Legislation, Justice and Regulations; handling legislative initiatives such as the limit on successive reelection of authorities, the creation of the new Child Protection Service, and various enabling mechanisms for the 2020 constitutional plebiscite.

He rose to fame in Chile starting in 1995, when he debuted as an actor in the telenovela Amor a domicilio. In the 1990s and 2000s he played various leading roles, such as in Adrenalina (1996) and Fuera de control (1999). In 2001 he starred in Amores de mercado, where he performed the most-watched scene in the history of Chilean television.

== Biography ==
Cruz-Coke is the son of lawyer and university professor Carlos Cruz-Coke Ossa and Lucía Carvallo Arriagada. His brother is Carlos Cruz-Coke Carvallo, Councilman of Vitacura in Santiago; the nephew of cultural manager Marta Cruz-Coke and grandnephew of physician-politician Eduardo Cruz-Coke (Marta's father).

Cruz-Coke studied in the Colegio de los Sagrados Corazones de Manquehue. He went on to study law in the Universidad Finis Terrae, later changing his major to Architecture and finally became an actor. He studied acting at the Lee Strasberg Theatre and Film Institute in New York City.

He holds a degree in Documentary Filming from the Academy of Christian Humanism University and a master's degree in Mass Communications from University of Chile.

== Career ==
Cruz-Coke has a fifteen-year acting career in film, theater and television. He is also the founder and director of the non-profit organization Teatro Lastarria 90, which caters to activities in film, theater and visual arts. Lastarria 90 has become a model innovator, attracting both private and public supporters, and which has received recognition en the world of the arts and critique.

He was spotted by an executive of Canal 13 in a pub while he was singing. His first television role was in 1995 in the series El Amor Esta de Moda, where he became known as the "romeo" of telenovela. He would go on to play further roles in other series. He won the award Apes in 2004 for his part in a telenovela Destinos Cruzados.

== Politics ==
Cruz-Coke was the founder of the Comisión Cultura de los Grupos Tantauco (Cultural Commission of the Tantauco Groups). During the 2009-2010 Chilean Presidential elections he openly supported the current President-elect Sebastián Piñera, who would later nominate him to the Ministry of Arts and Culture.

Luciano is one of the founders of Evópoli, a conservative-liberal and centre-right party.

== Acting ==
=== Film ===
- Se arrienda (2005) as Gastón Fernández
- Gente Decente (2004) as Andrés
- En un Lugar de la Noche (2000) as Simón
- Bienvenida Casandra (1996) as Padre
- 4 °C
- Vino con sabor a vodka

=== Series ===
- Una Pareja Dispareja (2009) Félix
- Los Simuladores: El Gran Juicio (2005) as Alberto Bunster
- Amigas en Bach (2004) as Alejandro
- Amor a Domicilio, la comedia (1996) as Benjamín Smith

=== Soap operas ===
- El amor está de moda (1995) as Juan Pablo Sepúlveda
- Amor a Domicilio (1995) as Benjamín Smith
- Adrenalina (1996) as Andrés Betancourt
- Amándote (1998) as Julián Trosciani
- Fuera de Control (1999) as Axel Schumacher
- Sabor a Ti (2000) as Feliciano Calquín
- Amores de Mercado (2001) as Ignacio Valdés
- Purasangre (2002) as Gabriel Callassi
- Pecadores (2003) as Angello Botero
- Destinos Cruzados (2004) as Mateo Goycolea
- Gatas & Tuercas (2005) as Borja San Juan
- Charly Tango (2006) as Álvaro Edwards Salazar
- Fortunato (2007) as Raul Cuevas / Judith Mendez

=== Theater ===
- "Moscas sobre el mármol" of L.A.Heiremanns dir. Alejandro Castillo (2009)
- "Gorda" de Nelly Labute dir. Alejandro Castillo (2009)
- "Criminal" de C. Daulte dir. Alejandro Goic (2007)
- "Normal" de A. Neilson. Junto a Hector Noguera dir. Claudio Santana (2006)
- "Homero/Iliada" de Alessandro Barrico dir. Hector Noguera (2008)
- "Julio Cesar" de Shakespeare. dir. F. Albornoz (2005)
- "Enigmas" E. E:Schmitt dir. Willy Semler (2004)
- "Asesinos" de R. Achondo en Lastarria 90. Dir. Rodrigo Achondo. (2002)
- "La señorita Julia" de Strindberg en Teatro Municipal. Dir. Felipe Braun (2003)
- "Fragmentos leídos por geólogos" de N.Chaurette Dir. Felipe Braun. (2002)
- "La Indagación" P.Weiss en Teatro UC- I. Goethe Dir. R.Lopez, R.Griffero (2002)
- "Largo viaje del día hacia la noche" E. O'Neill Teatro UC Dir. Willy Semler (2001)
- "Zoológico de cristal" de T. Williams, Teatro El Conventillo Dir. A. Cohen (2000)
- "Dios ha muerto" de M.A. De la Parra. Cía. La puerta Dir. Luis Ureta. (1999)
- "Sostiene Pereira" de A. Tabucci ICTUS. Dir. Nissim Sharim. (1999)
- "Three Sisters" de A. Chejov Off-Broadway, N. York Dir. George Loros. (1999)
