= The Eternal Memory =

2023 documentary film by Maite Alberdi

- Theatrical release poster
- Directed by: Maite Alberdi
- Screenplay by: Maite Alberdi
- Produced by: Maite Alberdi; Juan de Dios Larraín; Pablo Larraín; Rocio Jadue
- Cinematography: Pablo Valdés
- Edited by: Carolina Siraqyan
- Music by: Miguel Miranda; José Miguel Tobar; Daniel H. Logar
- Production companies: Micromundo; Fábula
- Distributed by: MTV Documentary Films
- Release dates: 21 January 2023 (Sundance); 24 August 2023 (Chile)
- Running time: 85 minutes
- Country: Chile
- Language: Spanish
- Box office: $120,794

The Eternal Memory (Spanish: La memoria infinita) is a 2023 Chilean documentary film directed by Maite Alberdi. The film follows the relationship of Chilean journalist Augusto Góngora and Chilean actress Paulina Urrutia. It was selected in the World Cinema Documentary Competition at the Sundance Film Festival where it had its world premiere on 21 January 2023 and won the Grand Jury Prize. It received critical acclaim and was named one of the top 5 documentary films of 2023 by the National Board of Review.

The film was nominated for Best Documentary Feature Film at the 96th Academy Awards, being Alberdi's second nomination in the category as well as the second Chilean documentary film to be nominated for an Academy Award. It also won Best Ibero-American Film at the 38th Goya Awards.

== Plot ==
Augusto Góngora and Paulina Urrutia have been a couple for 23 years. Augusto is one of Chile's most prominent cultural journalists and television presenters. His wife, Paulina, affectionately called "Pauli," is an actress who served as Minister of Culture and the Arts of the country from 2006 to 2010. Eight years ago, Augusto was diagnosed with Alzheimer's disease, and since then, Paulina has been caring for him. Throughout his career, Augusto was dedicated to ensuring that the atrocities of the Pinochet dictatorship are not forgotten. Today, it is up to him and his wife to maintain his identity despite the challenges of his illness. Each day, the couple faces the difficulties caused by Alzheimer's disease, but they also maintain the tenderness and sense of humor that bind them together.

== Cast ==
- Augusto Góngora
- Paulina Urrutia

== Release ==
=== Festivals ===
The film was first screened as a part of the World Cinema Documentary Competition at the Sundance Film Festival, premiering on 21 January 2023. At the festival, it won the Grand Jury Prize of the competition. It also screened in the Panorama section at the 73rd Berlin International Film Festival where it had its European premiere. It was also invited to the 27th Lima Film Festival for competing in Documentary section, where it was screened on 11 August 2023.

=== Theatrical ===
MTV Documentary Films acquired the distribution rights of the film planning a theatrical release. It had a limited release in US theaters during August 2023 beginning on August 11, 2023, in New York. It was commercially released on August 24, 2023, in Chilean theaters.

== Reception ==
=== Critical reception ===
On the review aggregator website Rotten Tomatoes, the film has an approval rating of 93% based on 73 reviews, with an average rating of 8.1/10. The website's consensus reads: "Telling a deeply personal story against a profound political backdrop, The Eternal Memory offers poignant testament to the power of love and remembrance." Metacritic, which uses a weighted average, assigned the film a score of 85 out of 100, based on 19 critics, indicating "universal acclaim".

Guy Lodge from Variety wrote that the film "treats inexorably sad material with a lighter, more lyrical approach than most". Writing for The Hollywood Reporter, David Rooney called the film "a moving chronicle of a marriage challenged by Alzheimer's", finishing his review commenting that the film is "as unexpectedly stirring as it is sorrowful".

=== Accolades ===
Award	Date of ceremony	Category	Recipient(s)	Result	Ref.
Sundance Film Festival	29 January 2023	World Cinema Grand Jury Prize: Documentary Competition	The Eternal Memory	Won	
Berlin International Film Festival	25 February 2023	Panorama Audience Award – Documentary	The Eternal Memory	Runner-up	
Miami International Film Festival	12 March 2023	Documentary Achievement Award	The Eternal Memory	Nominated	
Guadalajara International Film Festival	9 June 2023	Iberoamerican Competition – Best Documentary Film	The Eternal Memory	Nominated	
Lima Film Festival	18 August 2023	Best Documentary	The Eternal Memory	Nominated	
Athens International Film Festival	9 October 2023	Best Documentary	The Eternal Memory	Nominated	
Critics' Choice Documentary Awards	12 November 2023	Best Documentary Feature	The Eternal Memory	Nominated	
Critics' Choice Documentary Awards	12 November 2023	Best Director	Maite Alberdi	Nominated	
National Board of Review	6 December 2023	Top 5 Documentary Films	The Eternal Memory	Won (Note: This award does not have a single winner, but recognizes multiple films.)	
Los Angeles Film Critics Association Awards	10 December 2023	Best Documentary Film	The Eternal Memory	Runner-up	
IndieWire Critics Poll	11 December 2023	Best Documentary	The Eternal Memory	5th Place (Note: Tied with Four Daughters.)	
New York Film Critics Online Awards	15 December 2023	Best Documentary	The Eternal Memory	Won	
Forqué Awards	16 December 2023	Best Latin-American Film	The Eternal Memory	Won	
Toronto Film Critics Association	17 December 2023	Allan King Documentary Award	The Eternal Memory	Runner-up (Note: Shared with Four Daughters and Swan Song.)	
Florida Film Critics Circle Awards	21 December 2023	Best Documentary Film	The Eternal Memory	Runner-up	
Cinema Eye Honors	12 January 2024	Outstanding Non-Fiction Feature	Maite Alberti, Juan de Dios Larraín, Pablo Larraín and Rocío Jadue	Nominated	
Cinema Eye Honors	12 January 2024	Outstanding Direction	Maite Alberdi	Won	
Cinema Eye Honors	12 January 2024	Outstanding Editing	Carolina Siraqyan	Nominated	
Cinema Eye Honors	12 January 2024	Audience Choice Prize	The Eternal Memory	Nominated	
Cinema Eye Honors	12 January 2024	The Unforgettables	Augusto Góngora and Paulina Urrutia	Won	
Houston Film Critics Society	22 January 2024	Best Documentary Feature	The Eternal Memory	Nominated	
Goya Awards	10 February 2024	Best Ibero-American Film	The Eternal Memory	Won	
Academy Awards	10 March 2024	Best Documentary Feature Film	Maite Alberdi	Nominated	
Platino Awards	20 April 2024	Best Documentary	The Eternal Memory	Won	
Platino Awards	20 April 2024	Film and Values Education	The Eternal Memory	Nominated	
Platino Awards	20 April 2024	Best Film Editing	Carolina Siraqyan	Nominated	
