= A Place Called Dignity =

- Theatrical release poster
- Directed by: Matías Rojas Valencia
- Written by: Matías Rojas Valencia
- Produced by: Sophia Ayissi Nsegue; Fernando Bascuñán; Jorge Botero; Luciana Azul Calcagno; Iván Granovsky; Linus Günther; Titus Kreyenberg; Giancarlo Nasi; Pierre Perrot; Denis Vaslin
- Cinematography: Benjamín Echazarreta
- Edited by: Andrea Chignoli; Matías Rojas Valencia
- Music by: Eryck Abecassis
- Production company: Don Quijote Films
- Distributed by: New Europe Film Sales
- Release dates: November 22, 2021 (PÖFF); March 31, 2022 (Chile)
- Running time: 90 minutes
- Countries: Chile; France; Colombia; Argentina; Germany
- Languages: Spanish; German

A Place Called Dignity (Spanish: Un lugar llamado Dignidad) is a 2021 drama film written and directed by Matías Rojas Valencia. Starring Salvador Insunza, the film also features Hanns Zischler, Amalia Kassai, Luis Dubó, David Gaete, Giannina Fruttero and Paulina Urrutia. It is a co-production between Chile, France, Colombia, Argentina and Germany.

The film was named on the shortlist for Chilean's entry for the Academy Award for Best International Feature Film at the 95th Academy Awards, but it was not selected.

== Synopsis ==
Pablo is a 12-year-old boy who attends the school established by Germans in Chile called Colonia Dignidad where he is the favorite of the leader of the colony, Uncle Paul. Over time, Pablo witnesses the strangest things that happen there: abuse, disappearances, and demon-like creatures used to scare children. But in this wicked world a revolution is brewing, and it may be their only way out.

== Cast ==
The actors participating in this film are:

- Salvador Insunza as Pablo
- Hanns Zischler as Uncle Paul
- Amalia Kassai as Gisela
- Noa Westermeyer as Rudolph
- Luis Dubó as Pastor
- David Gaete as Johannes
- Alex Gorlich as Gerhard
- Alejandro Goic as Colonel
- Giannina Fruttero as Cecilia
- Claudia Cabezas as Chilean Woman
- Paulina Urrutia as First Lady
- Vivian Mahler as Dorothea
- Philippa Zu Knyphausen as Ingrid
- Gerardo Naumann as Hermann
- Ignacio Solari as Benjamín
- Christiane Diaz as German Woman 1
- Victoria De Gregorio as German Woman 2

== Release ==
A Place Called Dignity had its international premiere on November 22, 2021, at Tallinn Black Nights Film Festival, Estonia. It was commercially released on March 31, 2022, in Chilean theaters.

== Reception ==
=== Critical reception ===
Ricardo Gallegos from La Estatuilla highlights the script work by Matías Rojas Valencia, portraying the suffocating environment of Colonia Dignidad, avoiding sensationalism. He also highlighted the work of audiovisual language to create a very effective sense of isolation. Rob Aldam from Backseat Mafia wrote: "A Place Called Dignity is an impeccably made period drama which plays out like a dark fairy tale... Director Matias Rojas Valencia’s film does a great job of highlighting the horrendous practices which took place while, at the same time, being an engaging and moving drama."

=== Accolades ===
Year	Award / Festival	Category	Recipient	Result	Ref.
2021	Tallinn Black Nights Film Festival	Grand Prix - Best Film	A Place Called Dignity	Nominated	
2022	Huelva Latin American Film Festival	Best Director	Matías Rojas Valencia	Won	
2023	Caleuche Awards	Best Leading Actor	Salvador Insunza	Nominated	
2023	Caleuche Awards	Best Supporting Actress	Amalia Kassai	Nominated	
