= National Council of Culture and the Arts =

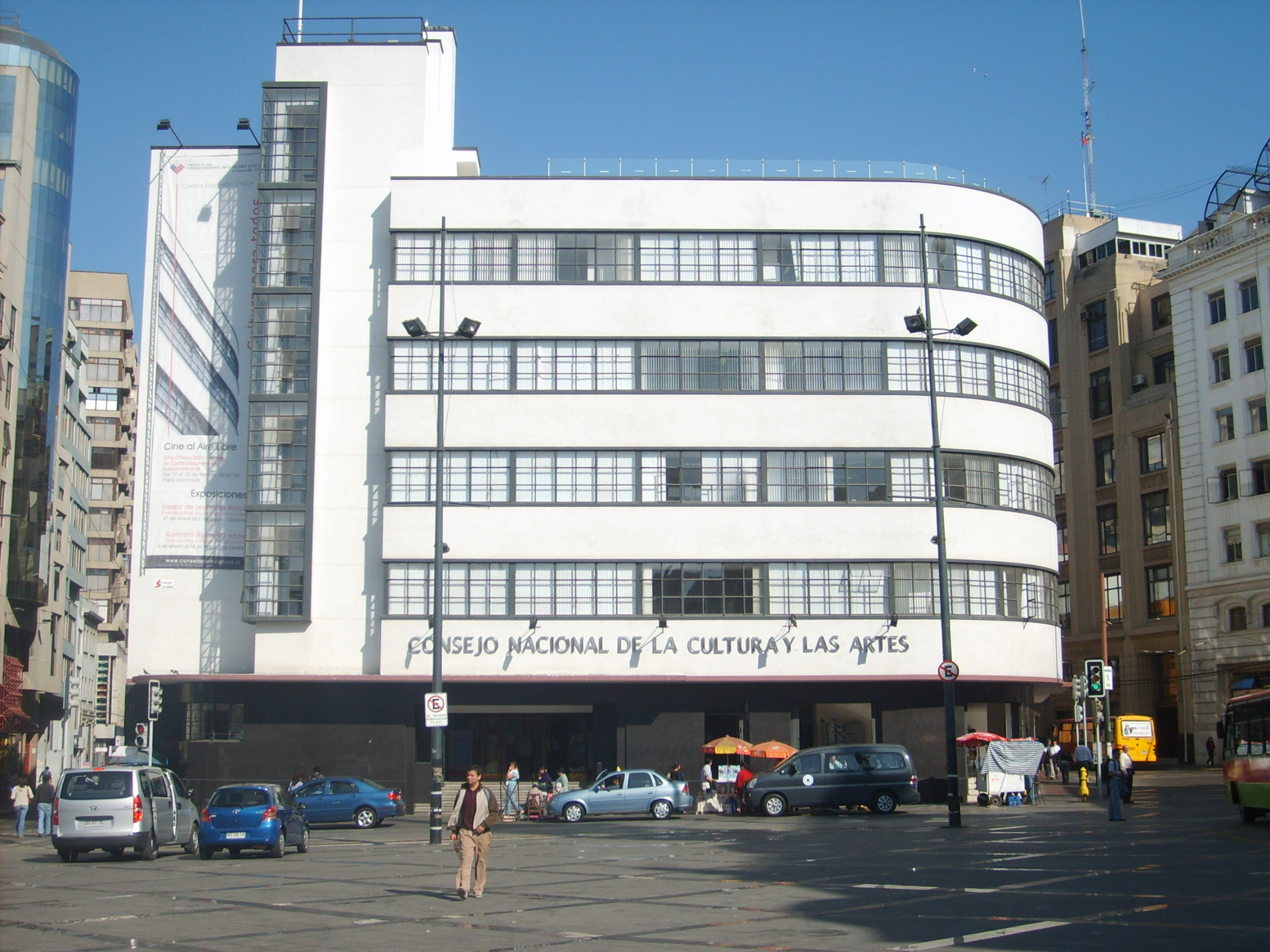

The National Council of Culture and the Arts (CNCA) was the Chilean government agency responsible for arts and cultural policy. The council was founded in 2003 and amalgamated arts and cultural policy under a single agency. It was a cabinet-level position in the Chilean government. Since the council was founded, six ministers were in charge of the council: José Weinstein under President Ricardo Lagos Escobar, Paulina Urrutia under President Michelle Bachelet, Luciano Cruz-Coke and Roberto Ampuero under President Sebastián Piñera, Claudia Barattini and Ernesto Ottone under the second term of President Michelle Bachelet.

Since 2004, CNCA has awarded the Pablo Neruda Order of Artistic and Cultural Merit to international figures who have stood out for contributions made in the field of art and culture, as well as the Pablo Neruda Ibero-American Poetry Award. Since 2006, as a result of Law No. 19.981, CNCA has given the Pedro Sienna Awards for Chilean audiovisual production.

The National Council of Culture and the Arts was replaced with the Ministry of Cultures, Arts and Heritage.
