= The Jump (2020 film) =

2020 film

- Promotional release poster
- Lithuanian: Šuolis
- Directed by: Giedrė Žickytė
- Written by: Giedrė Žickytė
- Produced by: Uldis Cekulis; Giedrė Žickytė
- Cinematography: Rimvydas Leipus
- Edited by: Thomas Ernst; Danielius Kokanauskis
- Music by: Kipras Masanauskas
- Release date: 22 June 2020
- Running time: 84 minutes
- Countries: Lithuania; Latvia; France; Germany; United States
- Languages: Lithuanian; English

The Jump (Lithuanian: Šuolis) is a 2020 documentary film written, co-produced and directed by Giedrė Žickytė. It was initially selected as the Lithuanian entry for the Best International Feature Film at the 94th Academy Awards, however, Isaac by Jurgis Matulevičius was ultimately submitted.

== Overview ==
In 1970, Lithuanian seaman Simas Kudirka caused an international incident after attempting defection by boarding a U.S. Coast Guard ship.

== See also ==
- List of submissions to the 94th Academy Awards for Best International Feature Film
- List of Lithuanian submissions for the Academy Award for Best International Feature Film
