= Griškabūdis =

- Town
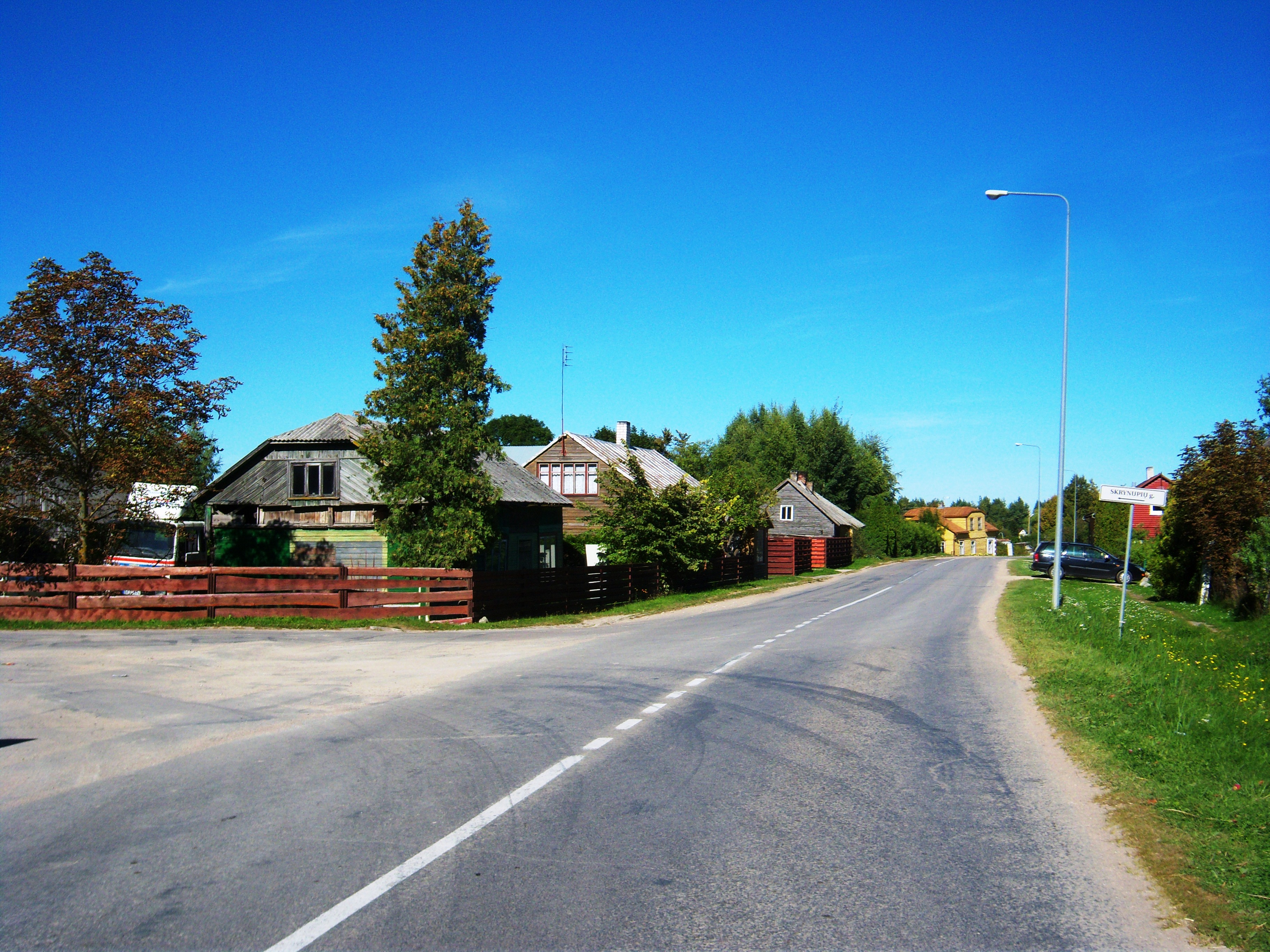

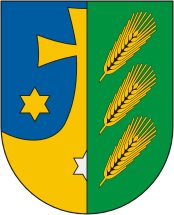
- Seal

- Location within Lithuania
- Coordinates: 54°51′10″N 23°10′0″E
- Country: Lithuania
- County: Marijampolė County

Population (2011)
  - Total: 857
- Time zone: UTC+2 (EET)
  - Summer (DST): UTC+3 (EEST)

Griškabūdis is a small town in Marijampolė County, in southwestern Lithuania. As of 2011, the town has a population of 857 people.

== History ==
The settlement started to develop towards the end of the seventeenth century. In the beginning, it was a wood processing area from which the timber was transported to Danzig. The very first time that the town called Griškabūdis was mentioned was in 1697–1706 in the Sintautai church heritage books. In 1715–1741 it consisted of 16-22 households and in 1742–1743 they built the first wooden church (chapel), which oversaw the Naumiestis Basieji Carmelites in which the Carmelite Monastery was founded and in 1805 it had been repealed. In 1796 they had built a new wooden church. The Carmelites contributed to the spiritual formation of the local population. From 1765 Griškabūdis had started to be called a town.

== Gallery ==
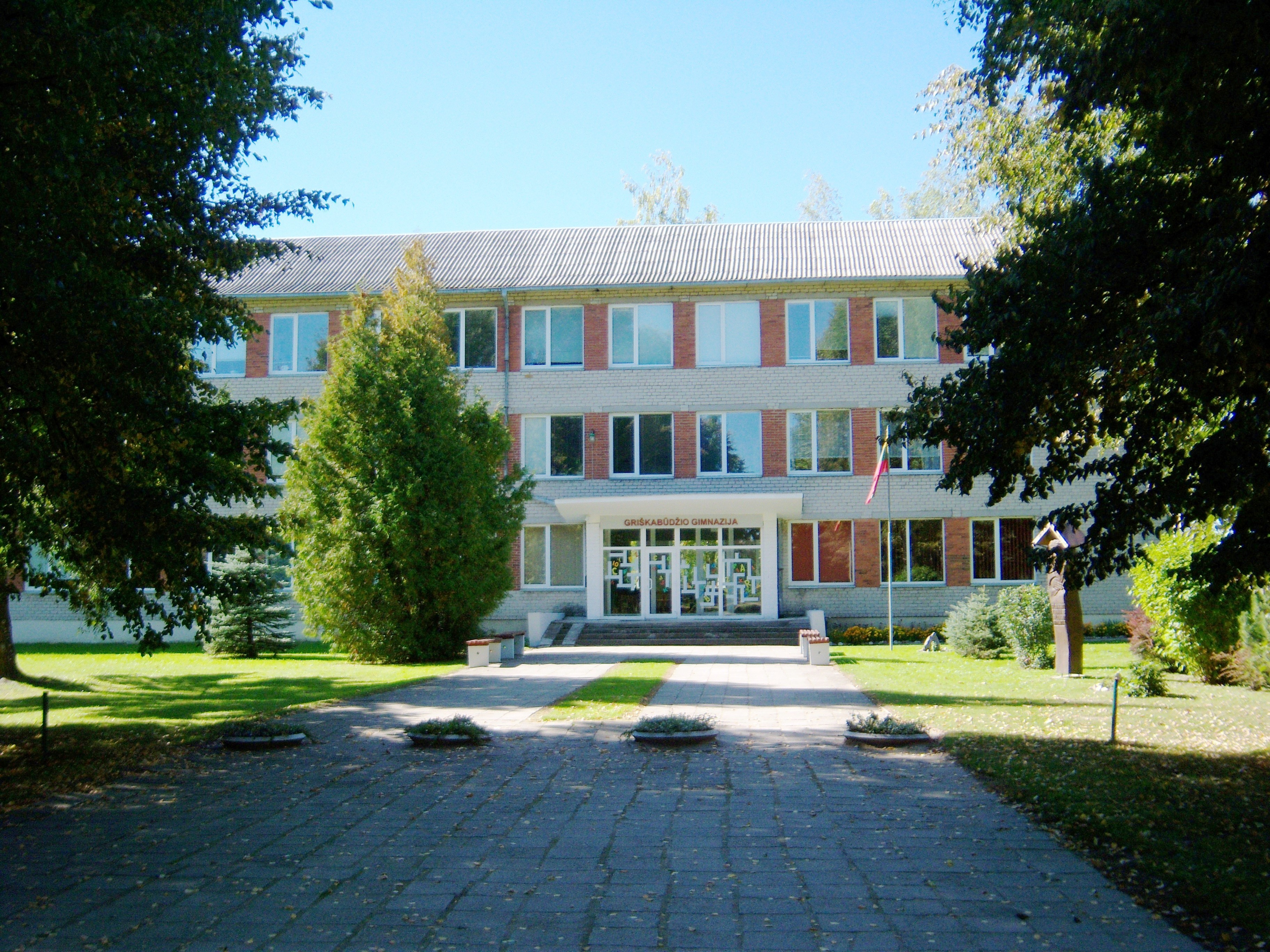
Griškabūdis Gymnasium

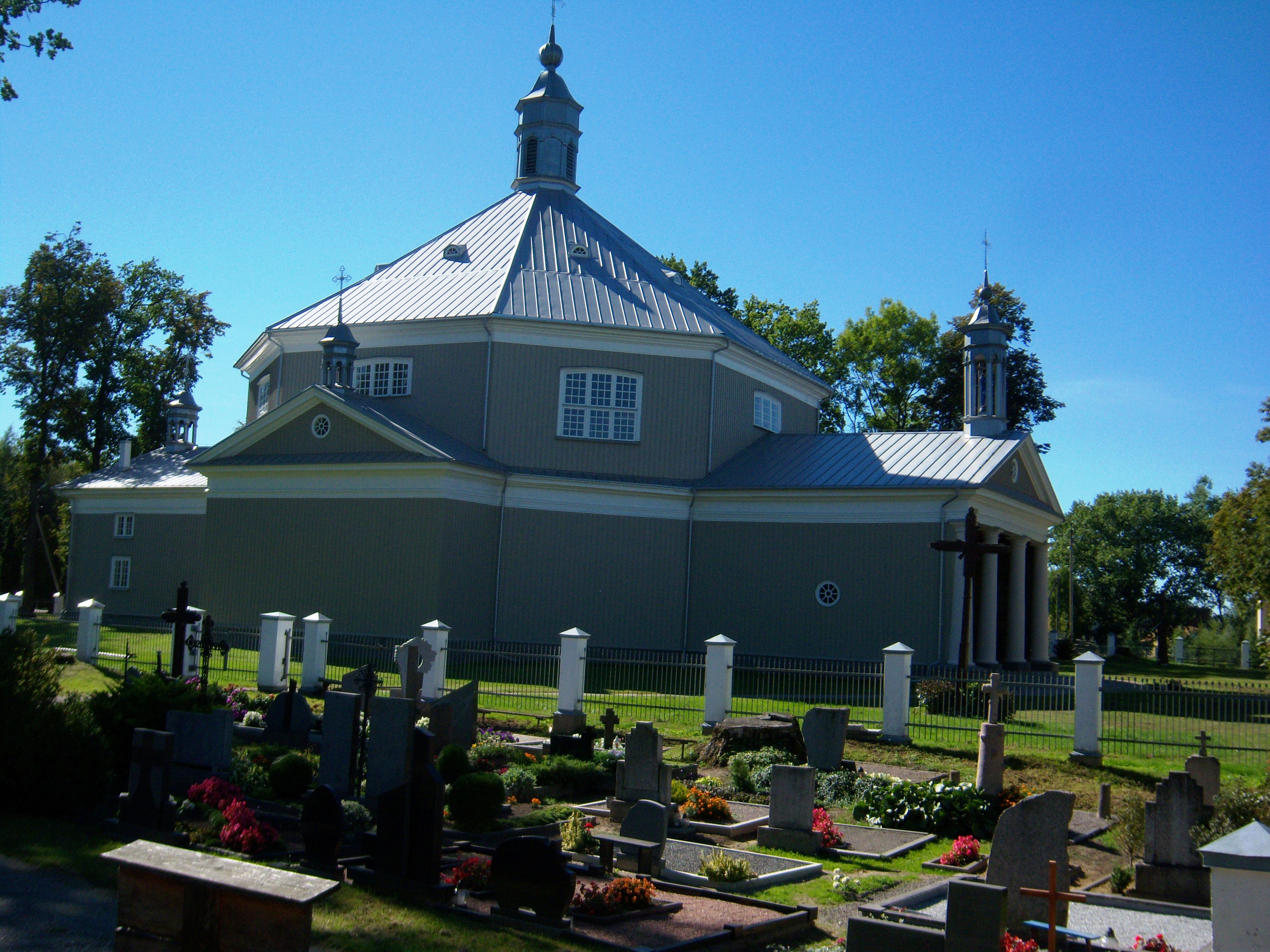
Church

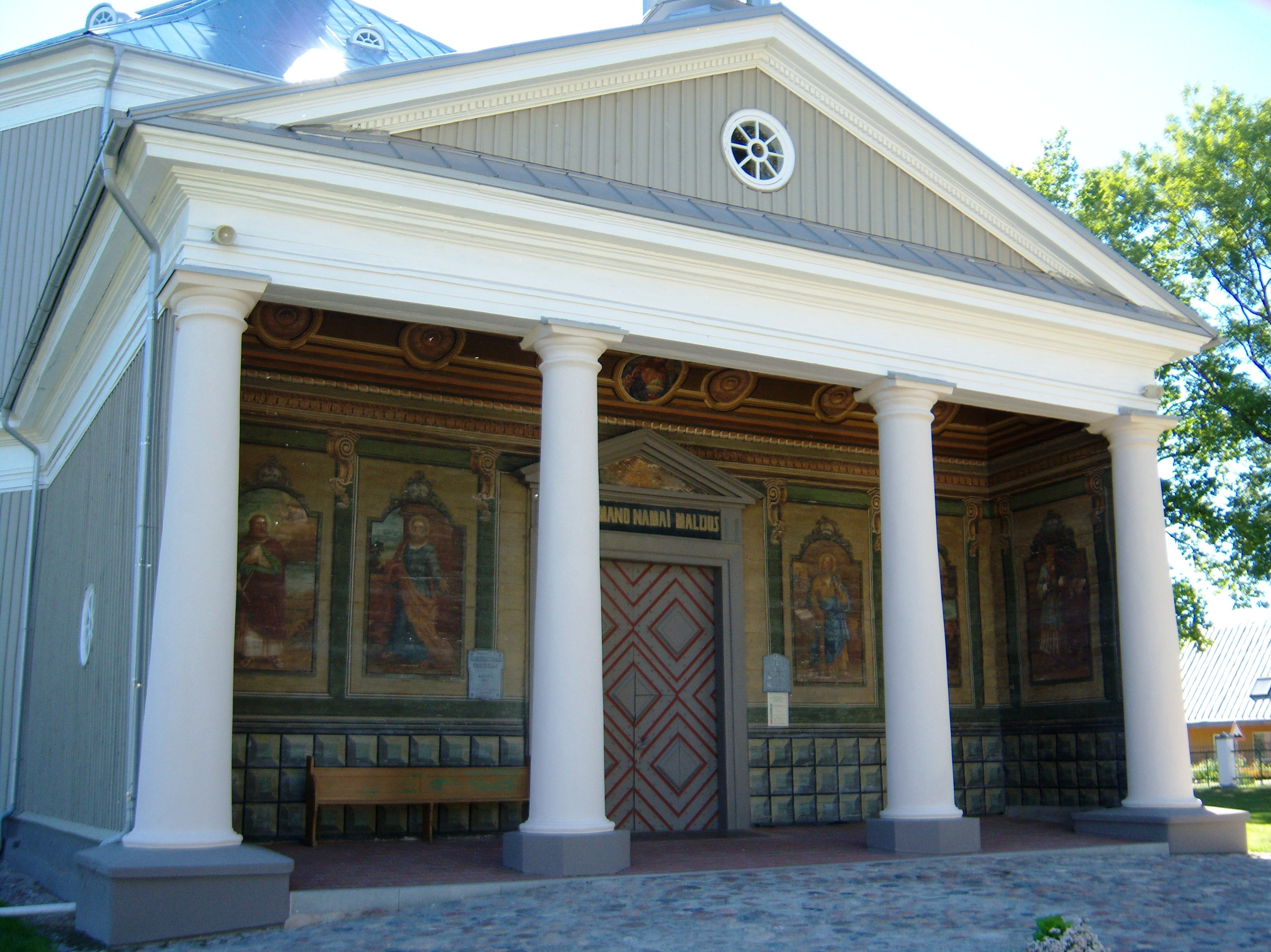
Front of the church

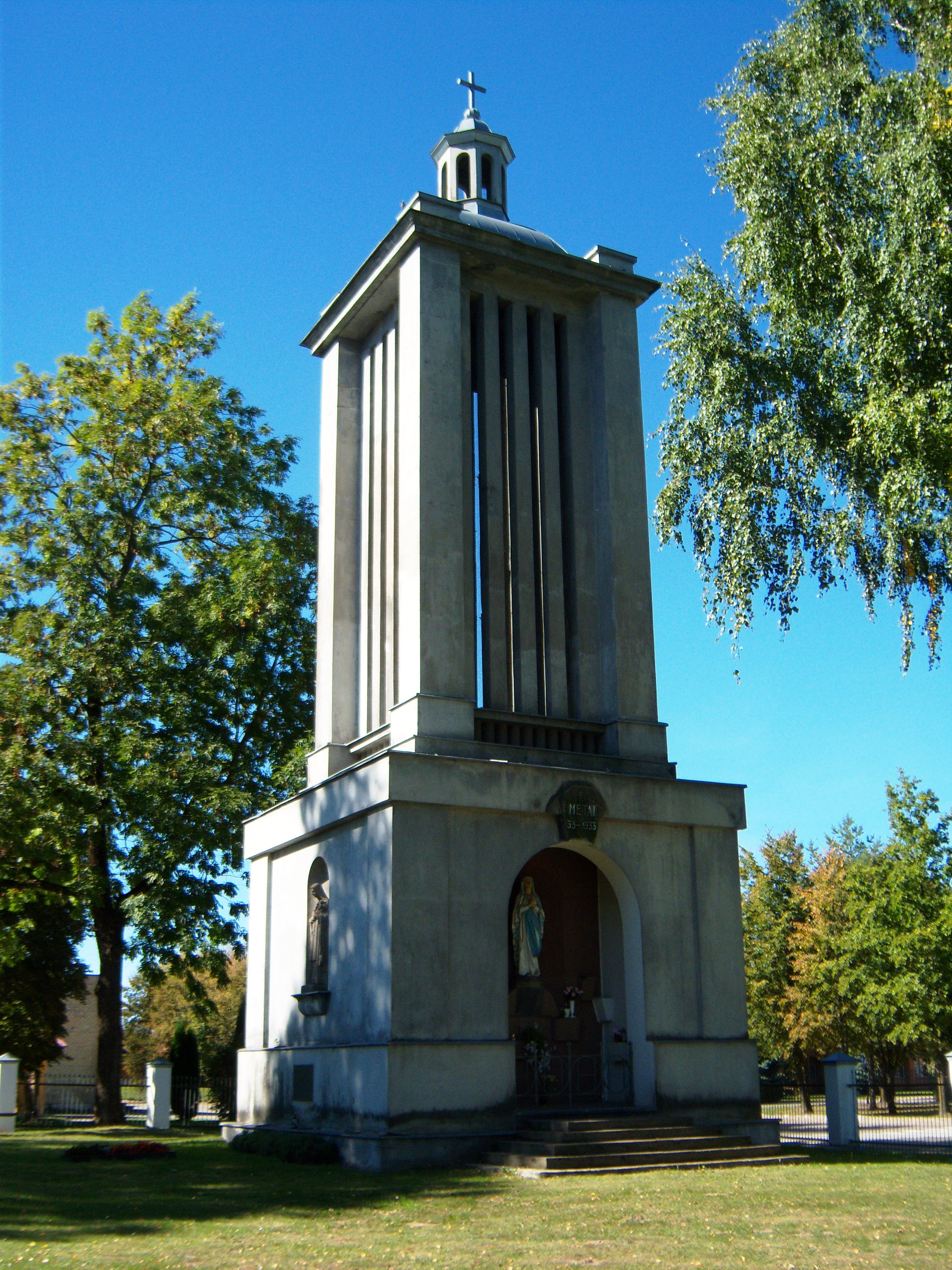
Church belfry

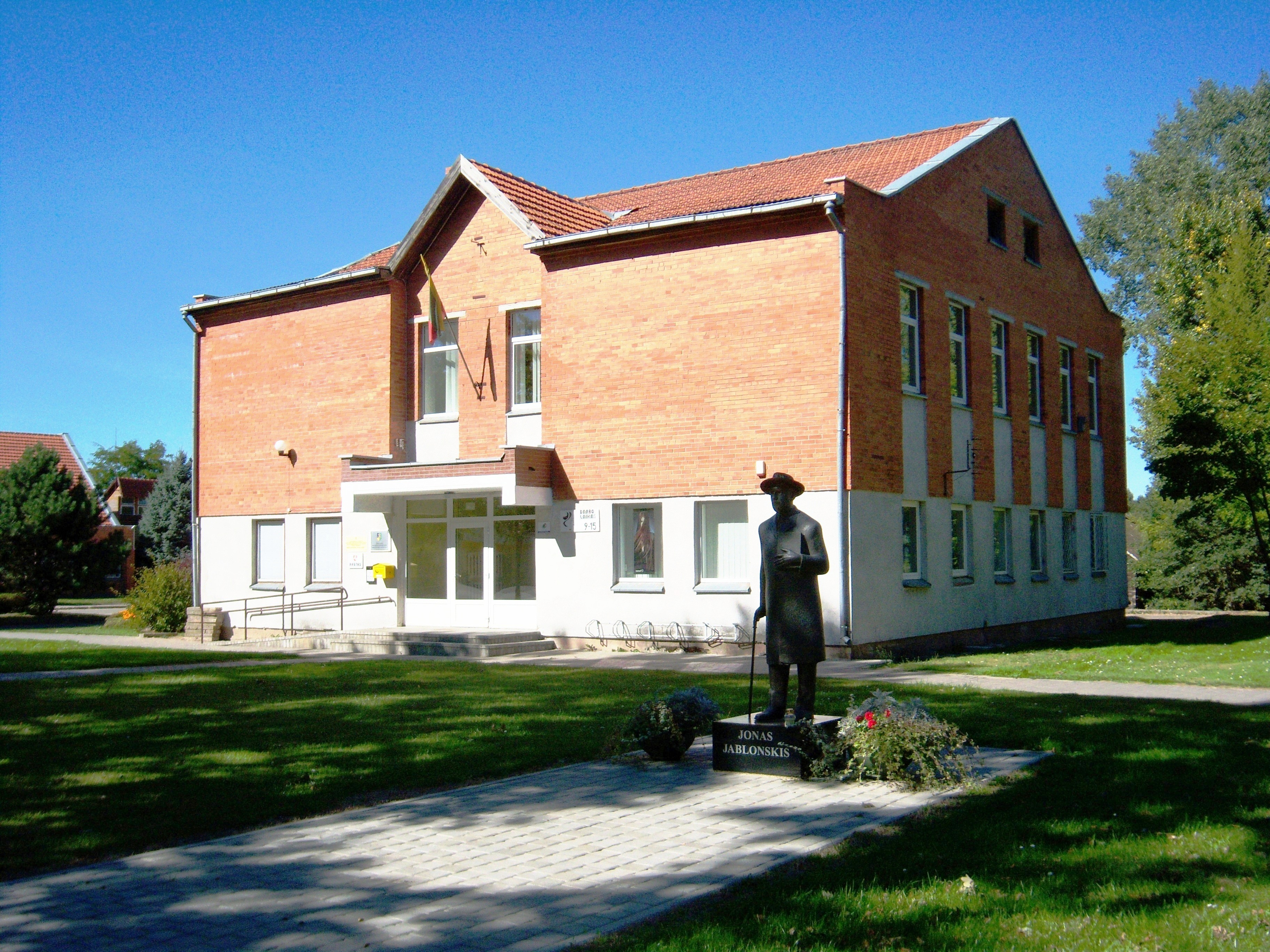
Town municipality building
