= You'll Never Be Alone (film) =

2016 film

- Film poster
- Directed by: Álex Anwandter
- Written by: Alex Anwandter
- Produced by: Isabel Orellana Guarello
- Starring: Sergio Hernández; Antonia Zegers
- Cinematography: Matías Illanes
- Edited by: Felipe Gálvez Haberle
- Music by: Alex Anwandter
- Production companies: 5AM Producciones; Araucaria Cine
- Release date: 16 February 2016 (Berlin)
- Running time: 90 minutes
- Country: Chile
- Language: Spanish

You'll Never Be Alone (Spanish: Nunca vas a estar solo) is a 2016 Chilean drama film written and directed by Álex Anwandter. It was shown in the Panorama section at the 66th Berlin International Film Festival. The film won a Jury Award from the Teddy Awards for LGBT-related feature films.

The film centres on Juan (Sergio Hernández), a shy factory worker struggling to pay the medical bills after his gay son is hospitalized in a gaybashing incident.

== Plot ==
After his teenage gay son is violently attacked, Juan (Sergio Hernández), a withdrawn manager at a mannequin factory, is faced with a difficult choice between paying for the exorbitant medical costs of his son Pablo (Andrew Bargsted) and making a final attempt to become a partner with his boss. As Juan struggles to navigate through dead ends and unexpected betrayals, he discovers that the world he thought he knew is also ready to be violent with him. Although Juan has made many mistakes, he still has a chance to save his son.

== Cast ==
- Antonia Zegers
- Sergio Hernández as Juan
- Gabriela Hernández as Lucy
- Andrew Bargsted as Pablo
- Edgardo Bruna as Bruno
- Astrid Roldan as Mari
