= Metro cuadrado =

- Directed by: Nayra Ilic
- Written by: Nayra Ilic
- Produced by: Nayra Ilic, Flor Ilic, Paulo Parra, Trébol film, Las Nenas, L90 cinedigital
- Starring: Natalia Grez, Fernanda Urrejola, Boris Quercia, Alvaro Viguera
- Cinematography: Tomás Yovane, Nicolás Canobra
- Edited by: Ilán Stehberg, Nayra Ilic
- Music by: Dominique Depret
- Distributed by: A Trebol Film/Lastarria 90 presentation
- Release date: 14 May 2011 (Cannes)
- Running time: 71 minutes
- Country: Chile
- Language: Spanish

Metro cuadrado (English: Square Meter) is a 2011 Chilean drama film directed and written by Nayra Ilic, and filmed in Santiago, Chile.

== Plot ==
The movie follows the story of Francisca, a young woman who has recently moved into an apartment with her boyfriend, Andrés. As she unpacks and builds her new life with her partner, her emotions are gradually deconstructed, and the film observes how everyday life can challenge the idea of living as a couple. The film quietly critiques the traditional notion of family, leaving clichés behind.

== Critics ==
The film has been well received by critics, with Variety.com saying: "Challenging herself to make a genuinely cinematic experience almost exclusively inside the confines of a big-city apartment, debuting Chilean writer-director Nayra Ilic surpasses her test with the sharply observed Square Meter".

== Cast ==
- Natalia Grez as Francisca
- Álvaro Vergura as Andrés
- Fernanda Urrejola as Romina
- Boris Quercia as The Father
- Consuelo Holzapfel as Andrea
- Nicolás Poblete as Nico
- Nicolás Botinelli as Eduardo
- Simon Bagioli as Gaspar
- NEA as The Band

== See also ==
- Cinema of Chile
