= Rara (film) =

- Film poster
- Directed by: Pepa San Martín
- Written by: Alicia Scherson; Pepa San Martín
- Produced by: Macarena López; Marianne Mayer-Beckh; Nicolás Grosso; Federico Sande Novo
- Starring: Julia Lübbert; Mariana Loyola; Agustina Muñoz; Emilia Ossandón; Daniel Muñoz; Sigrid Alegría; Coca Guazzini
- Cinematography: Enrique Stindt
- Music by: Ignacio Pérez
- Production companies: Manufactura de películas; Le Tiro Cine
- Release date: February 13, 2016 (Berlin International Film Festival)
- Running time: 90 minutes
- Countries: Chile, Argentina
- Language: Spanish

Rara is a 2016 Chilean-Argentine coming-of-age comedy film directed by Pepa San Martín, written by Alicia Scherson, and starring Julia Lübbert and Mariana Loyola. It is the first feature film produced by Manufactura de Películas, based in Santiago, and co-produced by Le Tiro Cine, from Buenos Aires.

Rara won the Jury Prize at the Berlin Film Festival in 2016, and received an Horizontes Latinos Award at the 64th edition of the San Sebastian Film Festival in 2016.

== Plot ==
Sara, a 13-year-old girl, faces challenges with school, boys, hiding a secret from her best friend, and her parents quarreling. She has no problems with her mother living with another woman, even if her father does not agree.

== Cast ==
- Julia Lübbert as Sara
- Emilia Ossandón as Catalina
- Mariana Loyola as Paula
- Agustina Muñoz as Lía
- Daniel Muñoz as Víctor
- Sigrid Alegría as Nicole
- Coca Guazzini as Icha
- Enrique Bustamante as school counselor
- Luz Croxatto as Eugenia
- Claudia Celedón as Ximena
- Micaela Cristi as Pancha
- Nicolás Vigneaux as Julián

== Awards ==
Award	Category	Recipient	Result
Berlin International Film Festival	Generation Kplus International Jury Award	Pepa San Martín	Winner
Berlin International Film Festival	Best First Feature Award	Pepa San Martín	Nominated
Berlin International Film Festival	Silver Bear	Pepa San Martín	Nominated
San Sebastián International Film Festival	Horizontes Latinos Award	Pepa San Martín	Winner
San Sebastián International Film Festival	Sebastiane Latino Award	Pepa San Martín	Winner
Jerusalem Film Festival	FIPRESCI Prize	Pepa San Martín	Nominated
Seattle International Film Festival	New Directors	Pepa San Martín	Nominated
Lisbon Gay & Lesbian Film Festival	Best Feature	Pepa San Martín	Winner
Lisbon Gay & Lesbian Film Festival	Best Actress	Julia Lübbert	Winner
Caleuche Awards	Best Lead Actress	Julia Lübbert	Winner
Caleuche Awards	Best Supporting Actress	Mariana Loyola	Winner
Platino Awards	Best Fiction Debut	Rara	Nominated
Platino Awards	Film and Education in Values	Rara	Nominated
Pedro Sienna Awards	Best Fiction Feature	Rara	Winner
Pedro Sienna Awards	Best Director	Pepa San Martín	Nominated
Pedro Sienna Awards	Best Supporting Actress	Mariana Loyola	Winner
