= Alicia Scherson =

Chilean film director, screenwriter, and producer (born 1974)

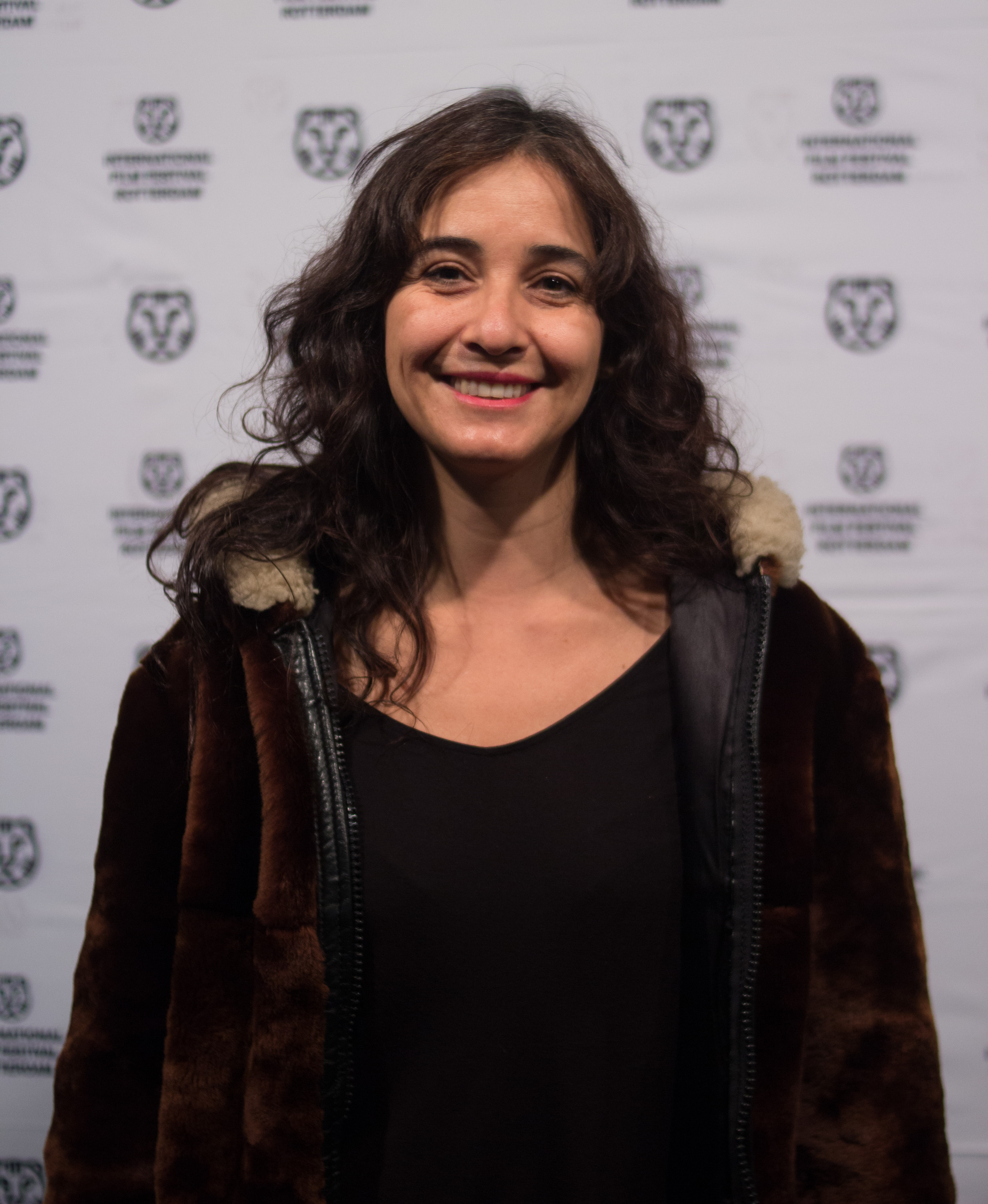
- Scherson at the International Film Festival Rotterdam in 2017
- Born: 1974 (age 51–52); Santiago, Chile
- Occupations: Director; screenwriter; producer
- Years active: 2001–present

Alicia Scherson (born 1974) is a Chilean film director, screenwriter, and producer.

== Biography ==
Scherson studied filmmaking in the Escuela de Cine de Cuba and in 1999 received a Fulbright Scholarship to study for a Master of Fine Arts from the University of Illinois at Chicago.

Scherson's debut film Play was awarded Best Director at the 2005 Tribeca Film Festival. The Times called Play a "doozy of a showreel," but also criticized its "sketchy emotional construction." Scherson's second film, Tourists, was selected for the 2009 Tiger Awards Competition.

Scherson collaborated with author Alejandro Zambra on Vida de Familia, a film based on one of his stories. The 80 minute feature was screened at the Sundance Film Festival in January 2017.

== Filmography ==
Year	Title	Director	Writer	Producer	Notes
2002	Crying Underwater	Yes	Yes	Yes	(short)
2005	Baño de mujeres	Yes	No	No	(short)
2005	Play	Yes	Yes	No	
2009	Optical Illusions	No	Yes	No	directed by Cristián Jiménez
2009	Tourists	Yes	Yes	Yes	(executive producer)
2011	Verano	No	No	Yes	directed by José Luis Torres Leiva
2012	Copia imperfecta: para Raúl Ruiz	No	No	Yes	(short) directed by José Luis Torres Leiva
2013	Las Analfabetas	No	No	Yes	directed by Moisés Sepúlveda
2013	Il Futuro	Yes	Yes	No	
2015	El Bosque de Karadima	No	Yes	No	directed by Matías Lira
2015	El Bosque de Karadima: La Serie	No	Yes	No	(TV mini-series) (1 episode)- "La Iniciación"
2015	Rara	No	Yes	No	directed by Pepa San Martín
2015	Las Plantas	No	No	Yes	directed by Roberto Doveris
2017	Vida de Familia	Yes	Yes	No	(co-directed with Cristián Jiménez)
2019	Invisible Heroes	Yes	No	No	Chilean-Finnish TV series

=== As a writer ===
- 2017 Vida de Familia
- 2015 El Bosque de Karadima: La Serie (TV mini-series) (1 episode)- "La Iniciación"
- 2015 Rara
- 2015 El Bosque de Karadima (written by)
- 2013 Il Futuro (written by)
- 2009 Optical Illusions (writer)
- 2009 Tourists (writer)
- 2005 Play
- 2002 Crying Underwater (short)

=== As a director ===
- 2017 Vida de Familia (co-directed with Cristián Jiménez)
- 2013 Il Futuro
- 2009 Tourists
- 2005 Baño de mujeres (short)
- 2005 Play
- 2002 Crying Underwater (short)

=== As a producer ===
- 2015 Las Plantas (associate producer)
- 2013 Las Analfabetas (co-producer)
- 2011 Verano (executive producer)
- 2009 Tourists (executive producer)
- 2002 Crying Underwater (short) (producer)

=== As an actress ===
- 2011 Verano - Turista Sewell
- 2005 Play - Woman at Photomat (uncredited)
- 2001 Time's Up!

=== As an editor ===
- 2002 Crying Underwater (short)
- 2002 Mi hermano y yo (documentary)

=== As part of the camera and electrical department ===
- 2002 Crying Underwater (short) (camera operator)

=== As part of the miscellaneous crew ===
- 2012 Thursday Till Sunday (script consultant)

=== Thanks ===
- 2012 Thursday Till Sunday (the director wishes to thank)
- 2011 Zoológico (the director wishes to thank)
- 2011 Bonsái (special thanks)
- 2011 Metro Cuadrado (thanks)
- 2005 Time Off (thanks)
