= Much Ado About Nothing (2016 film) =

2016 film

- Film poster
- Directed by: Alejandro Fernández Almendras
- Written by: Alejandro Fernández Almendras
- Produced by: Pedro Fontaine; Augusto Matte
- Starring: Agustín Silva; Paulina García; Daniel Alcaíno; Alejandro Goic; Luis Gnecco; Augusto Schuster
- Cinematography: Inti Briones
- Edited by: Sebastian Salfate (assistant editor)
- Distributed by: Market Chile
- Release dates: 23 January 2016 (Sundance); 1 September 2016 (Chile)
- Running time: 94 minutes
- Country: Chile
- Language: Spanish

Much Ado About Nothing (Spanish: Aquí no ha pasado nada) is a 2016 Chilean drama film directed by Alejandro Fernández Almendras. It was shown in the Panorama section at the 66th Berlin International Film Festival.

It was inspired by a real-life political scandal in Chile. In 2013, Martín Larraín, son of Senator Carlos Larraín (then-president of the right-wing party Renovación Nacional), was acquitted after killing a man in a DUI hit and run while his friends took the fall.

== Plot ==
Vicente, who resides in Los Angeles, returns to Chile to spend his summer at his parents' beach house. He is a reckless and somewhat solitary young man. However, one of those typical nights of pursuing girls and having drinks alters his life forever; he becomes the prime suspect in a hit-and-run accident that results in the death of a local fisherman. "I wasn't the one driving," he insists, but his memories are muddled. He does recall being in the car and that the driver was the son of a powerful politician.

== Cast ==
- Agustín Silva as Vicente "Vicho" Maldonado
- Samuel Landea as Manuel Larrea
- Paulina García as Roxana
- Alejandro Goic as Uncle Julio
- Daniel Alcaíno as Prosecutor Yáñez
- Augusto Schuster as Diego
- Pilar Ronderos as Camila
- Geraldine Neary as Francisca
- Isabella Costa as Ana
- Victoria de Gregorio as Sofía
- Li Fridman as Lucía
- Mariana di Girolamo as María
- Luis Gnecco as Gustavo Barría
