= Maite Alberdi =

Chilean film director

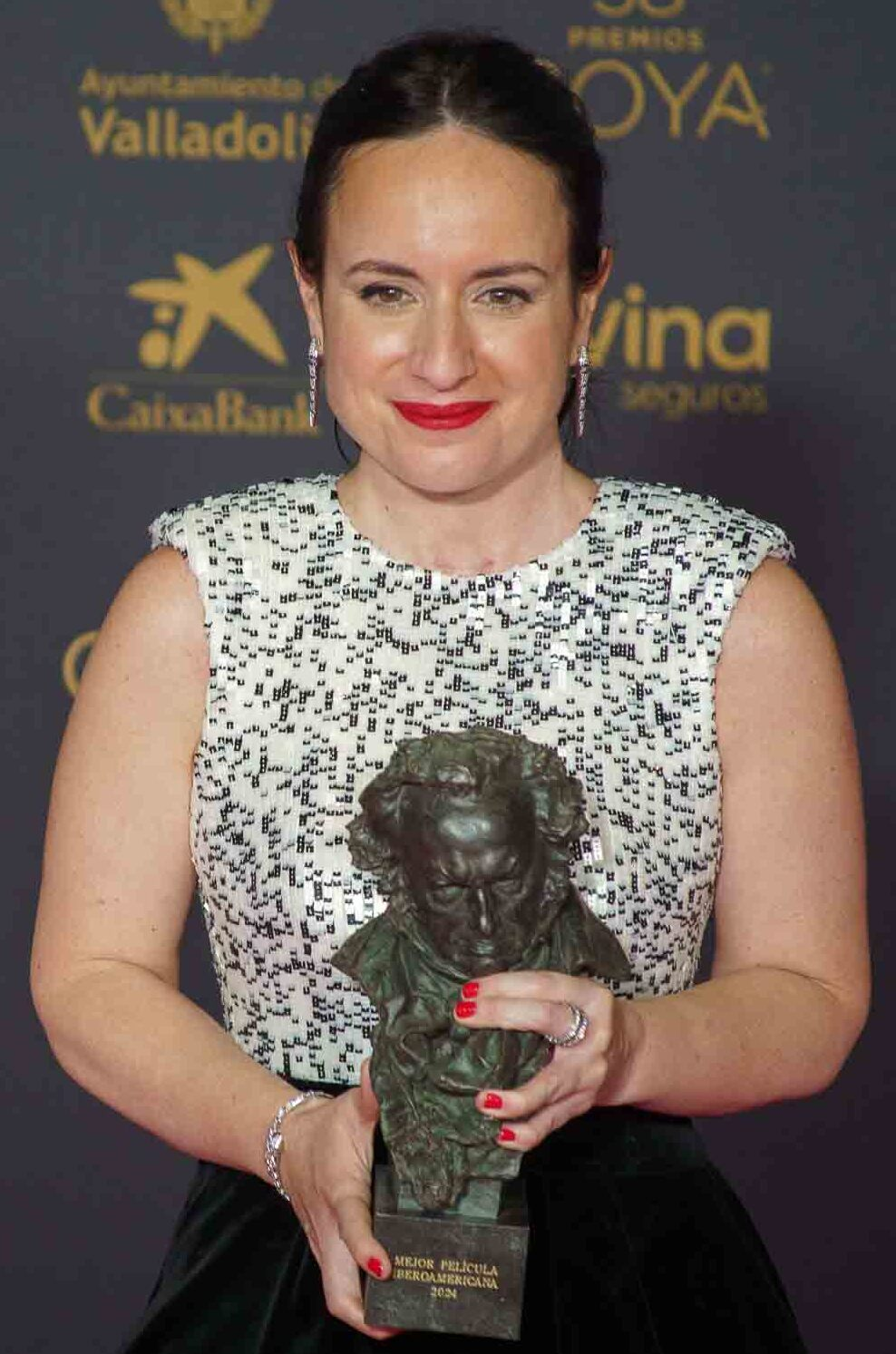
- Alberdi in 2024
- Born: Maite Alberdi Soto; 29 March 1983 (age 43); Santiago, Chile
- Education: Pontifical Catholic University of Chile
- Occupation: Filmmaker
- Years active: 2004–present
- Known for: The Mole Agent

Maite Alberdi Soto (born 29 March 1983 in Santiago, Chile) is a Chilean film producer, director, documentarian, screenwriter, and film critic. She is the founder of Micromundo Producciones.

== Education ==
Alberdi graduated from the Pontificial Catholic University of Chile with degrees in aesthetics and social communication.

== Career ==
Alberdi is a director and filmmaker from the Pontificial Catholic University of Chile, and teaches documentary directing at several universities. Her works as a film critic have been published on the website La Fuga, a film studies magazine founded in 2005 in Santiago, Chile, with the intent to "open a field of debate and academic reflection, producing and disseminating unpublished material of interest for the cinematographic cultural field." She co-authored a book, Teorías del cine documental en Chile: 1957-1973.

For her documentaries La once (The Tea Time, 2014) and Los niños (The Grown-Ups 2016), she won the Best Female Documentary Director Award at the International Documentary Film Festival Amsterdam.

She was invited as a member of the Academy of Motion Pictures Arts and Sciences in June 2018, under the documentary branch. She was also acting producer for Los Reyes, following the lives of two stray dogs as "they wander around the oldest skatepark (Los Reyes) in the Chilean capital of Santiago." In 2020, her film The Mole Agent gained international recognition and was nominated for the Academy Award for Best Documentary, being the first Chilean documentary film to be nominated for an Academy Award. The film was also a nominee at the Goya Awards for Best Ibero-American Film.

Her next film The Eternal Memory furthered her international recognition. It premiered at the 2023 Sundance Film Festival to critical acclaim, winning the Grand Jury Prize. In Spain, the film won both the Forqué Award for Best Latin American Film and the Goya Award for Best Ibero-American Film. The Eternal Memory was also nominated for the Academy Award for Best Documentary, being Alberdi's second nomination in the category.

== Filmography ==
Since 2004, Alberdi has participated in taking on various roles in the making of each of these films. Films with their original Spanish titles are followed by their English translation, or English-provided title in parentheses.

- A Child of My Own (2026)
- In Her Place (2024)
- The Eternal Memory (2023)
- The Mole Agent (2020)
- Los Reyes (The Kings) (2018)
- Los niños (2016)
- Yo no soy de aquí (I'm Not From Here; short film) (2016)
- Sex Life of Plants (2015)
- Propaganda (2014)
- La once (Tea Time) (2014)
- Verano (Summer) (2011)
- El salvavidas (The Lifeguard) (2011)
- Las peluqueras (The Hairdressers; short film) (2008)
- Los trapecistas (The Trapeze Artists; short film, 2005)
- Carrete Down (Reel Down; short film) (2004)

== Awards and nominations ==
| Year | Award | Category | Nominated work | Result | Ref. |
|---|---|---|---|---|---|
| 2015 | Goya Awards | Best Iberoamerican Film | La once | Nominated | |
| 2016 | Pedro Sienna Awards | Best Feature Length Documentary | La once | Nominated | |
| 2016 | Pedro Sienna Awards | Best Direction | La once | Nominated | |
| 2016 | Platino Awards | Best Documentary | La once | Nominated | |
| 2016 | 29th European Film Awards | Best Short Film (shared with Giedrė Žickytė) | I'm Not from Here | Nominated | |
| 2017 | Pedro Sienna Awards | Best Documentary Short Film | I'm Not from Here | Won | |
| 2017 | Miami International Film Festival | Knight Documentary Achievement Award | Los niños | Nominated | |
| 2017 | Miami International Film Festival | Zeno Mountain Award | Los niños | Won | |
| 2018 | Platino Awards | Best Documentary | Los niños | Nominated | |
| 2020 | Academy Awards | Best Documentary Feature (shared with Marcela Santibanez) | The Mole Agent | Nominated | |
| 2020 | Bergen International Film Festival | Documentaire Extraordinaire | The Mole Agent | Nominated | |
| 2020 | Goya Awards | Best Ibero-American Film | The Mole Agent | Nominated | |
| 2020 | Miami International Film Festival | Knight Documentary Achievement Award | The Mole Agent | Nominated | |
| 2020 | San Sebastián International Film Festival | Audience Award for Best Film | The Mole Agent | Nominated | |
| 2020 | San Sebastián International Film Festival | Audience Award for Best European Film | The Mole Agent | Won | |
| 2020 | National Board of Review Awards | Top Five Foreign Language Films | The Mole Agent | Won | |
| 2021 | Cinema Eye Honors | Cinema Eye Audience Choice Prize | The Mole Agent | Nominated | |
| 2021 | Independent Spirit Awards | Best Documentary Feature | The Mole Agent | Nominated | |
| 2023 | Sundance Film Festival | World Cinema Documentary Competition (Grand Jury Award) | The Eternal Memory | Won | |
| 2023 | Berlin International Film Festival | Audience Award | The Eternal Memory | Nominated | |
| 2023 | Miami International Film Festival | Documentary Achievement Award | The Eternal Memory | Nominated | |
| 2024 | Goya Awards | Best Ibero-American Film | The Eternal Memory | Won | |
| 2024 | Academy Awards | Best Documentary Feature Film | The Eternal Memory | Nominated | |
