= Play (2005 film) =

2005 film

- Film poster
- Directed by: Alicia Scherson
- Written by: Alicia Scherson
- Cinematography: Ricardo de Angelis
- Music by: Joseph Costa; Marc Hellner
- Release date: 2005
- Running time: 100 minutes
- Countries: Chile; Argentina; France
- Language: Spanish

Play is a 2005 Chilean-Argentine-French drama film directed by Alicia Scherson. It was selected as the Chilean entry for the Best Foreign Language Oscar at the 78th Academy Awards, but it did not make the final shortlist.

== Plot ==
This movie shows the events that happen to Cristina, a young Mapuche woman who works as a caretaker for an elderly man in Santiago, Chile, where she lives. One day, she runs into Tristán, a close friend who has just lost a suitcase and is in a state of shock. The movie begins with a proverb that says, "They were hard times, but modern."

== Cast ==
- Viviana Herrera
- Andrés Ulloa
- Aline Kuppenhein
- Coca Guazzini
- Jorge Alis
- Francisco Copello
- Juan Pablo Quezada
- Andrei Slobodianik
- María José San Martín

== See also ==
- List of submissions to the 78th Academy Awards for Best Foreign Language Film
- List of Chilean submissions for the Academy Award for Best Foreign Language Film
