= Alejandro Goic (actor) =

Chilean actor

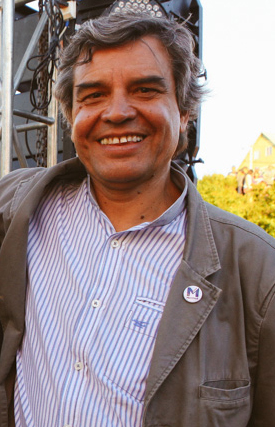
- Born: 11 September 1957 (age 68); Santiago, Chile
- Occupation: Actor
- Years active: 1988-present

Alejandro Eduardo Goic Jerez (born 11 September 1957) is a Chilean actor. He appeared in more than fifty films since 1988.

== Biography ==
Alejandro Goic is the son of physician Alejandro Goic Goic and Carmen Jerez Horta, and the nephew of former Christian Democratic senator Alberto Jerez Horta.

During his youth, Goic was active in the Socialist Youth and then the Socialist Party. After the 1973 military coup, he was interrogated and tortured by the DINA. In the 1980s he went into exile in Sweden, where his daughter was born.

== Selected filmography ==
Year	Title	Role	Notes
2005	The Last Moon		
2009	The Maid	Edmundo	
2010	Drama		
2010	Old Cats		
2012	Young and Wild		
2013	No	Ricardo	
2013	Gloria		
2015	The Club	Padre Ortega	
2016	The 33		
2016	Neruda		
2016	Jesús		
2021	A Place Called Dignity	Colonel	
2022	Blanquita		
2023	Mutt	Pablo	
2024	The Wild Years	Tommy Wolf	
2026	The Smell of Apples	Mr. Smith	
