= Bad Gyal discography =

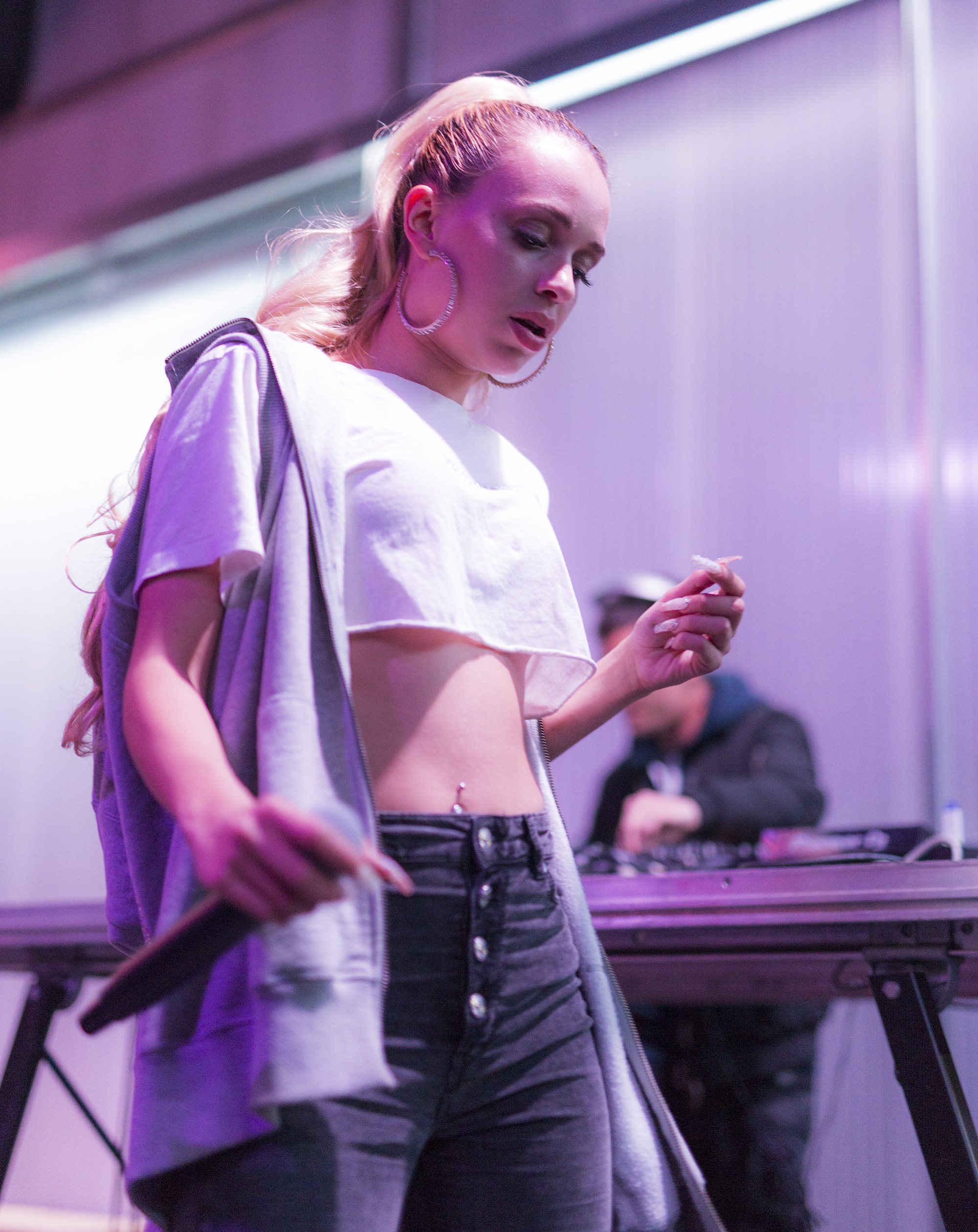
- Bad Gyal in 2018
- Studio albums: 2
- EPs: 2
- Singles: 56
- Music videos: 51
- Promotional singles: 1
- Mixtapes: 2

The discography of Spanish singer and songwriter Bad Gyal consists of one studio album, two mixtapes, two extended plays (EPs), and 56 singles (including one as a featured artist).

In 2016, Bad Gyal gained recognition after releasing "Pai", a reinterpretation of Rihanna's "Work" in the Catalan language; this led to the creation of Slow Wine Mixtape, her debut mixtape published the same year. It included the single "Fiebre", one of Bad Gyal's signature songs, which was certified 4× platinum in Spain and entered the Spanish Songs list at 96 eight years after its release, peaking at 93 in 2025. In 2018, she released her second mixtape, Worldwide Angel, to international critical acclaim. In 2019, Bad Gyal signed with Aftercluv Dance Lab and Interscope Records and saw mainstream acclaim with songs such as "Santa María", "Zorra", and "Alocao", the latter becoming the number-one song in Spain in 2019. In March 2021, Bad Gyal released her debut EP and first full-length release as a signed artist, Warm Up, followed by her second EP, Sound System: The Final Releases, in December of that year. In January 2024, Bad Gyal released her debut studio album, La joia. The album was supported by several singles, including "Chulo pt. 2" with rappers Tokischa and Young Miko, which became Bad Gyal's first song to chart in several countries.

== Albums ==
=== Studio albums ===
List of studio albums, with selected details, chart positions, and certifications
Title	Details	Peaks	Certifications
Title	Details	SPA	Certifications
La joia	Released: 26 January 2024; Label: Universal Latino, Interscope; Format: LP, CD, digital download, streaming	1	PROMUSICAE: Gold; RIAA: Gold (Latin)
Más cara	Released: 6 March 2026; Label: Universal Latino, Interscope; Format: LP, CD, digital download, streaming	2	

=== Mixtapes ===
List of mixtapes, with selected details and chart positions
Title	Details	Peaks
Title	Details	SPA
Slow Wine Mixtape	Released: 9 November 2016; Label: none (self-released); Format: digital download, streaming	75
Worldwide Angel	Released: 23 February 2018; Label: Puro, Canada; Format: digital download, streaming	11

== Extended plays ==
List of extended plays, with selected details and chart positions
Title	Details	Peaks
Title	Details	SPA
Warm Up	Released: 19 March 2021; Label: Aftercluv, Interscope; Format: digital download, streaming	5
Sound System: The Final Releases	Released: 9 December 2021; Label: Universal Latino, Interscope; Format: digital download, streaming	—
"—" denotes a recording that did not chart or was not released in that territory.

== Singles ==
=== As lead artist ===
List of singles as lead artist, showing year released, selected chart positions, certifications, and originating album
Title	Year	Peak chart positions										Certifications	Album
Title	Year	SPA	ARG	CHL	ECU	NIC	PAR	PER	URU	US Latin	WW	Certifications	Album
"Mercadona"	2016	—	*	*	*	—	—	*	—	—	*	PROMUSICAE: Gold	Slow Wine Mixtape
"Fiebre"	2016	93	*	*	*	—	—	*	—	—	*	PROMUSICAE: 4× Platinum	Slow Wine Mixtape
"Jacaranda" (featuring Dubbel Dutch)	2017	—	*	*	*	—	—	*	—	—	*	PROMUSICAE: Gold	Non-album single
"Nicest Cocky" (featuring Paul Marmota)	2017	—	*	*	*	—	—	*	—	—	*		Non-album single
"Blink" (featuring Florentino)	2018	—	*	*	*	—	—	*	—	—	*		Worldwide Angel
"Candela" (featuring Dubbel Dutch)	2018	—	*	*	*	—	—	*	—	—	*	PROMUSICAE: Gold	Worldwide Angel
"Por ti" (with Florentino)	2018	—	*	*	*	—	—	*	—	—	*		Fragmentos
"Internationally" (featuring Jam City and Dubbel Dutch)	2018	—	*	*	*	—	—	*	—	—	*		Worldwide Angel
"Más raro"	2018	—	*	*	*	—	—	*	—	—	*	PROMUSICAE: Gold	Non-album single
"Open the Door" (with Govana featuring DJ Papis)	2018	—	—	*	*	—	—	*	—	—	*	PROMUSICAE: Gold	Non-album single
"Yo sigo iual" (featuring Fakeguido and el Guincho)	2018	—	—	*	*	—	—	*	—	—	*		Worldwide Angel
"Unknown Feeling" (featuring Qraig Voicemail)	2018	—	—	*	*	—	—	*	—	—	*		Non-album single
"Santa María" (featuring Busy Signal)	2019	14	—	*	*	—	—	*	—	—	*	PROMUSICAE: Platinum	Non-album single
"Hookah"	2019	55	—	*	*	11	—	*	—	—	*	PROMUSICAE: Platinum	Non-album single
"Alocao" (with Omar Montes)	2019	1	—	*	*	13	—	*	—	—	*	PROMUSICAE: 6× Platinum	Non-album single
"Zorra" (solo or with Rauw Alejandro)	2019	2	—	*	*	—	—	*	—	—	*	PROMUSICAE: 3× Platinum	Non-album single
"Tú eres un bom bom (remix)" (with Kafu Banton or version with Kafu Banton and Guaynaa)	2020	9	—	*	*	—	—	*	—	—	*	PROMUSICAE: Platinum	Non-album single
"Aprendiendo el sexo"	2020	29	—	*	*	—	—	*	—	—	*	PROMUSICAE: Gold	Warm Up
"Blin blin" (featuring Juanka)	2020	7	—	*	*	—	—	*	—	—	—	PROMUSICAE: 2× Platinum	Warm Up
"Pussy" (featuring El Guincho)	2021	50	—	*	*	—	—	*	—	—	—		Warm Up
"Judas" (featuring Khea)	2021	44	—	*	*	—	—	*	—	—	—		Warm Up
"44" (featuring Rema)	2021	17	—	*	*	—	—	*	—	—	—	PROMUSICAE: Platinum	Warm Up
"Bobo" (with Mariah Angeliq and María Becerra)	2021	41	96	*	*	—	—	*	—	—	—	PROMUSICAE: Gold	La tóxica
"Esta noche" (with Lalo Ebratt)	2021	—	—	*	*	—	—	*	—	—	—		Non-album single
"Flow 2000" (solo or featuring Beny Jr)	2021	9	—	*	*	—	—	*	—	—	—	PROMUSICAE: 3× Platinum	Non-album single
"Nueva York (tot*)"	2021	5	—	*	*	—	—	*	—	—	—	PROMUSICAE: 2× Platinum	Sound System: The Final Releases
"Su payita (gramos)"	2021	18	—	*	*	—	—	*	—	—	—	PROMUSICAE: Gold	Sound System: The Final Releases
"Slim Thick"	2021	43	—	*	*	—	—	*	—	—	—		Sound System: The Final Releases
"Formosa (remix)" (with Kaio Viana and Toy el Frio featuring MC CJ)	2022	—	—	—	—	—	—	—	—	—	—		Non-album single
"La prendo"	2022	22	—	—	—	—	—	—	—	—	—	PROMUSICAE: 2× Platinum	Non-album single
"Tremendo culón"	2022	92	—	—	—	—	—	—	—	—	—	PROMUSICAE: Gold	Non-album single
"Sexy"	2022	62	—	—	—	—	—	—	—	—	—	PROMUSICAE: Gold	La joia
"Sin carné"	2022	35	—	—	—	—	—	—	—	—	—	PROMUSICAE: Gold	La joia
"Real G" (with Quevedo)	2022	12	—	—	—	—	—	—	—	—	—	PROMUSICAE: Platinum	La joia
"Chulo" (solo or with Tokischa and Young Miko)	2023	16	16	7	11	3	44	9	18	33	89	AMPROFON: Gold; PROMUSICAE: 4× Platinum; RIAA: 6× Platinum (Latin)	La joia
"Qué rico" (with el Dany MG and un Titico)	2023	—	—	—	—	—	—	—	—	—	—		Non-album single
"Mi lova" (with Myke Towers)	2023	21	—	—	—	—	—	—	—	—	—	PROMUSICAE: Platinum	La joia
"Ghetto Princess" (with Ovy on the Drums and Ryan Castro)	2023	—	—	—	—	—	—	—	—	—	—		Non-album single
"Enamórate" (with Nicki Nicole)	2023	24	68	—	—	—	—	—	—	—	—	PROMUSICAE: Gold	Non-album single
"Give Me"	2023	49	—	—	—	—	—	—	—	—	—		La joia
"Bota niña" (with Anitta)	2024	86	—	—	—	—	—	—	—	—	—		La joia
"Perdió este culo" (solo or with Ivy Queen)	2024	15	—	—	—	—	—	—	—	—	—	PROMUSICAE: Platinum	La joia
"Double Team" (with Anitta and Brray)	2024	—	—	—	—	—	—	—	—	—	—		Funk Generation
"SexeSexy" (with Mushkaa and Bexnil)	2024	37	—	—	—	—	—	—	—	—	—	PROMUSICAE: Gold	SexySensible
"Guay" (with Ozuna)	2024	8	—	—	—	—	—	—	—	—	—	PROMUSICAE: Platinum	Non-album single
"Party amanecio" (with Ryan Castro and De la Ghetto featuring Maldy, DJ Luian, and Mambo Kingz)	2024	—	—	—	—	—	—	—	—	—	—		Non-album single
"Duro de verdad pt. 2" (with los Sufridos)	2024	2	—	—	—	—	—	—	—	—	—	PROMUSICAE: 2× Platinum	Non-album single
"2AM" (with Sebastián Yatra)	2024	18	85	—	—	—	—	—	—	—	—	PROMUSICAE: Gold	Non-album single
"Angelito" (with Trueno)	2025	7	51	—	—	—	—	—	—	—	—	PROMUSICAE: Platinum	Non-album single
"Comernos" (with Omar Courtz)	2025	5	—	—	—	—	—	—	—	—	—	PROMUSICAE: Platinum	Non-album single
"Da Me"	2025	7	—	—	—	—	—	—	—	—	—	PROMUSICAE: Platinum	Más Cara
"Última Noche" (with Ozuna)	2025	23	—	—	—	—	—	—	—	—	—		Más Cara
"Fuma"	2025	42	—	—	—	—	—	—	—	—	—		Más Cara
"Choque" (with Chencho Corleone)	2026	7	—	—	—	—	—	—	—	—	—		Más Cara
"—" denotes a recording that did not chart or was not released in that territory. "*" indicates a chart that did not exist at the time.

=== As featured artist ===
List of singles as featured artist, showing year released and originating album
Title	Year	Album
"Commotion" (Lowlight featuring Bad Gyal and Demaro Small)	2017	Dopamine

=== Promotional singles ===
List of promotional singles, showing year released and chart positions
Title	Year	Peaks
Title	Year	SPA
"El sol me da"	2023	90

== Guest appearances ==
List of non-single guest appearances, showing year released, chart positions, certifications, and originating album
Title	Year	Peak chart positions					Certifications	Album
Title	Year	SPA	COL	US	US Latin	WW	Certifications	Album
"Tra" (with Soto Asa)	2018	—	*	—	—	*		Down Music
"Kiyaera" (with Soto Asa)	2020	—	*	—	—	—		Coupé
"Kármika" (with Karol G and Sean Paul)	2023	19	21	— (Note: "Kármika" did not enter the Billboard Hot 100, but peaked at number 17 on the Bubbling Under Hot 100 chart.)	25	169	PROMUSICAE: Platinum	Mañana será bonito
"Barcelona" (with Polimá Westcoast and Standly)	2023	—	—	—	—	—		De camino a Hermes
"Gato" (with J Balvin)	2024	—	—	—	—	—		Rayo
"Maille" (with Jul)	2024	—	—	—	—	—		Inarrêtable
"Wet" (with Gordo)	2024	82	—	—	—	—		No hay verano sin Gordo
"Se Le Ve" (with Kybba, Ryan Castro and Topboy-tgr)	2026	20	—	—	—	—		
"—" denotes a recording that did not chart or was not released in that territory. "*" indicates a chart that did not exist at the time.

== Other charted songs ==
List of other charted songs, showing year released, chart positions, and originating album
Title	Year	Peaks	Album
Title	Year	SPA	Album
"Iconic"	2021	91	Warm Up
"Gasto"	2021	99	Warm Up
"La que no se mueva" (with Tommy Lee Sparta)	2024	90	La joia
"Bad Boy" (with Ñengo Flow)	2024	51	La joia
"Skit"	2024	66	La joia
"Así soy" (with Morad)	2024	78	La joia
"Más cara"	2026	6	Mas cara
"Te Daré"	2026	28	Mas cara

== Music videos ==
=== As lead artist ===
List of music videos as lead artist, showing year released, other featured artists, and directors
Title	Year	Other artists	Directors	Ref.
"Mercadona"	2016	None	Pol Renom	
"Fiebre"	2016	None	Unknown	
"Jacaranda"	2017	Dubbel Dutch	Alexis Gómez	
"Nicest Cocky"	2017	Paul Marmota	Roger Guàrdia	
"Blink"	2018	Florentino	Alexis Gómez	
"Candela"	2018	Dubbel Dutch	Manson	
"Por ti"	2018	Florentino	Alexis Gómez	
"Internationally"	2018	Jam City; Dubbel Dutch	Bàrbara Farré	
"Más raro"	2018	Cadenza	Kirx	
"Open the Door"	2018	Govana; DJ Papis	Roger "Ruption" Walker	
"Yo sigo iual"	2018	Fakeguido; El Guincho	Cyprien Clément-Delmas	
"Santa María"	2019	Busy Signal	Unknown	
"Hookah"	2019	None	Miguel Ángulo	
"Alocao"	2019	Omar Montes	Fabricio Jiménez	
"Zorra"	2019	None	Manson	
"Tú eres un bom bom (remix)"	2020	Kafu Banton	Laura Vifer	
"Aprendiendo el sexo"	2020	None	Manson	
"Blin blin"	2021	Juanka	Pawla Casanovas; Javier Peralvo	
"Zorra (remix)"	2021	Rauw Alejandro	Pawla Casanovas; Javier Peralvo	
"Pussy"	2021	El Guincho	Pawla Casanovas; Javier Peralvo	
"Judas"	2021	Khea	Pawla Casanovas; Javier Peralvo	
"44"	2021	Rema	Pawla Casanovas; Javier Peralvo	
"Bobo"	2021	Mariah Angeliq; María Becerra	Iohana Sagaro	
"Esta noche"	2021	Lalo Ebratt	Andrés Gómez	
"Flow 2000"	2021	None	Bad Gyal	
"Slim Thick"	2021	None	Ismael OkBye	
"Flow 2000 (remix)"	2022	Beny Jr	Javier Peralvo	
"La prendo"	2022	None	Luca Dobry	
"Tremendo culón"	2022	None	Luca Dobry	
"Sin carné"	2022	None	Manson	
"Real G"	2022	Quevedo	Javier Peralvo	
"Chulo pt. 2"	2023	Tokischa; Young Miko	Artasans	
"Mi lova"	2023	Myke Towers	John Tashiro; Cam Erickson	
"Ghetto Princess"	2023	Ovy on the Drums; Ryan Castro	Eduardo Montes	
"Enamórate"	2023	Nicki Nicole	Facundo Ballve	
"Perdió este culo"	2024	None	Félix Bollaín	
"Bota niña"	2024	Anitta	Didi Domench	
"Double Team"	2024	Anitta; Brray	Sam Hayes	
"SexeSexy"	2024	Mushkaa; Bexnil	Souto; Jordilops	
"Perdió"	2024	Ivy Queen	Stillz	
"Party amanecio"	2024	Ryan Castro; De la Ghetto; Maldy; DJ Luian; Mambo Kingz	Gus	
"Duro de verdad pt. 2"	2024	Los Sufridos	Los Sufridos; Daniel D'Meza	
"2AM"	2024	Sebastián Yatra	Tomás Peña	
"Angelito"	2025	Trueno	Yavez Anthonio	

=== As featured artist ===
List of music videos as featured artist, showing year released, other featured artists, and directors
Title	Year	Other artists	Directors	Ref.
"Commotion"	2017	Lowlight; Demaro Small	Laura Martínova	

=== Cameo or guest appearances ===
List of cameo or guest appearances, showing year released, artists, and directors
Title	Year	Artists	Directors	Ref.
"La Baby"	2023	Tainy; Daddy Yankee; Feid; Sech	Elliot Muscat; Sho Mitsui; Jack Peros; Nick Collini	
