= Más Cara World Tour =

2026 concert tour by Bad Gyal

- Tour by Bad Gyal
- Location: Europe; Latin America; North America
- Associated album: Más Cara
- Start date: 20 March 2026
- End date: 8 November 2026
- Legs: 3
- No. of shows: 25

Bad Gyal concert chronology
- Bikini Badness Tour (2025); Más Cara World Tour (2026)

The Más Cara World Tour was the sixth concert tour by Spanish singer-songwriter Bad Gyal, in support of her second studio album, Más Cara. The tour began on 20 March 2026 in Barcelona and concluded on 8 November 2026 in Dallas. It consists of 25 scheduled shows.

== Background ==
In the summer of 2025, Bad Gyal embarked on the Bikini Badness Tour, during which she performed "Da Me" and "Última Noche", the lead singles from her second studio album, Más Cara, which was released on 6 March 2026.

On 25 September 2025, she was announced as one of the headlining acts for the 2026 edition of Primavera Sound. On the same day, she confirmed on the red carpet at Premios Juventud 2025 that she was completing her next album, which was scheduled for release in 2026. On 9 October 2025, Bad Gyal shared the first dates of the tour supporting the album on social media. During the presale on 14 October 2025, she posted a promotional poster for the Spanish leg of the tour on Instagram. Registration for the ticket presale opened the same day, with the presale taking place on 16 October. Later that month, she confirmed appearances at the Portuguese edition of Primavera Sound Porto and Roskilde Festival.

On 28 April 2026, she announced the Latin American and North American legs of the tour.

== Commercial performance ==
=== Ticket sales ===
During the presale, tickets for the Barcelona and Madrid concerts sold out quickly, and the ticketing platform again experienced technical issues because of heavy traffic. On 17 October 2026, Bad Gyal announced additional dates in Barcelona and Madrid in response to demand. On 20 October, further dates were added in Barcelona, Bilbao, and Madrid after the previously announced shows sold out.

== Setlist ==
This set list is from the March 20, 2026, concert in Barcelona.

Act I

1. "Un coro y ya :)"
2. "Más cara"
3. "Gatitas"
4. "Da me"
5. "Mi debili"
6. "Te daré"
7. "Sin carné"
8. "Noticia de ayer"
9. "Duro de verdad pt. 2"
10. "Qué rico"

Act II

11. "Fashion Girl pt. 2"
12. "Perro"
13. "Choque"
14. "Tic Tac (Hour Love)"
15. "Hoy te toca"
16. "Guay"
17. "Última noche"
18. "De to"
19. "La iniciativa"
20. "Comernos"
21. "Otra vez más"
22. "Blin blin"
23. "Flow 2000"
24. "Chulo pt. 2"

Act III

25. "De por vida"
26. "Fa$hion Killa"
27. "Zorra"
28. "Perdió este culo"
29. "Angelito"
30. "Muñeca"
31. "La que no se mueva"
32. "Orilla"
33. "Slim Thick"
34. "Fuma"
35. "Fiebre"

=== Miscellaneous ===
- During the third show in Madrid, Bad Gyal performed "Pai" following "Fuma".
- During the show in Seville, "Nueva York (tot*)" was performed as a special gift from Bad Gyal to the seville fans in the audience since the show was rescheduled.
- During the show in Porto, "Mi debili", "Sin carné", "Duro de verdad pt. 2", "Qué rico", "Hoy te toca", "Guay", "Última noche", "De to", "Comernos", "Otra vez más", "Blin blin", "De por vida", "Zorra", "Angelito", "Muñeca", "La que no se mueva", and "Slim Thick" were not performed.

=== Special guests ===
- 20, 21, 22 March, and 11, 12, 14 April: Bad Gyal performed "Tic Tac (Hour Love)" and "Orilla" with 8Belial.
- 14 April: Bad Gyal performed "La Iniciativa" and "La Pregunta" with J Álvarez.
- 18 October: Bad Gyal performed "De Dior XL" with Feid.
- 28 October: Bad Gyal performed "La Iniciativa" with J Álvarez.
- 4 November: Bad Gyal performed "Chulo pt. 2" with Tokischa.

== Dates ==
List of 2026 concerts
Date (2026)	City	Country	Venue	Opening act	Attendance	Revenue
20 March	Barcelona	Spain	Palau Sant Jordi	—N/a	—	—
21 March	Barcelona	Spain	Palau Sant Jordi	—N/a	—	—
22 March	Barcelona	Spain	Palau Sant Jordi	—N/a	—	—
11 April	Madrid	Spain	Movistar Arena	—N/a	—	—
12 April	Madrid	Spain	Movistar Arena	—N/a	—	—
14 April	Madrid	Spain	Movistar Arena	—N/a	—	—
24 April	Valencia	Spain	Roig Arena	—N/a	14,991 / 14,991	$746,702
15 May	Bilbao	Spain	Bilbao Arena Miribilla	—N/a	—	—
16 May	Bilbao	Spain	Bilbao Arena Miribilla	—N/a	—	—
23 May	A Coruña	Spain	Coliseum	—N/a	—	—
29 May	Seville	Spain	Live Sur Stadium	—N/a	—	—
12 June (Note: The concert on 12 June at the Parque da Cidade in Porto, is part of the Primavera Sound Porto.)	Porto	Portugal	Parque da Cidade	—N/a		
4 July (Note: The concert on 4 July at the Roskilde Dyreskueplads in Roskilde, is part of the Roskilde Festival.)	Roskilde	Denmark	Roskilde Dyreskueplads	—N/a		
14 October	Buenos Aires	Argentina	Movistar Arena	Zé Pequeña	—	—
16 October	Santiago	Chile	Movistar Arena	Akatumamy	—	—
18 October	Bogotá	Colombia	Chamorro City Hall	—N/a	—	—
22 October	Mexico City	Mexico	Palacio de los Deportes	Sayuri & Sopholov	—	—
23 October	Monterrey	Mexico	Auditorio Banamex	Sayuri & Sopholov	—	—
25 October	Guadalajara	Mexico	Telmex Auditorium	Sayuri & Sopholov	—	—
28 October	Miami Beach	United States	The Fillmore Miami Beach	Judith	—	—
30 October	San Juan	Puerto Rico	Coca-Cola Music Hall	—N/a	—	—
1 November	Chicago	United States	Riviera Theatre	Judith	—	—
4 November	New York City	United States	Terminal 5	Judith	—	—
6 November	Los Angeles	United States	The Wiltern	Judith	—	—
8 November	Dallas	United States	House of Blues	Judith	—	—

=== Cancelled shows ===
Date (2026)	City	Country	Venue	Reason	Ref.
4 June (Note: The concert on 4 June at the Parc del Fórum Live in Barcelona, is part of the Primavera Sound.)	Barcelona	Spain	Parc del Fòrum	Weather conditions	
