= La joia =

2024 studio album by Bad Gyal

Studio album by Bad Gyal
- Released: 26 January 2024
- Genres: Reggaeton; dancehall; house; Afrobeats
- Length: 41:30
- Languages: Spanish; Jamaican Patois (Note: Tommy Lee Sparta's vocals on "La que no se mueva".)
- Labels: Universal Latino; Interscope
- Producers: Merca Bae; SHB; Jeremy Ayala; Caleb Calloway; Nely el Arma Secreta; Scott Storch; Illa; el Guincho; Gabriel do Borel; LNK; Dany Wolf; Mag; Jasper Harris; Lil Geniuz; Nuviala; Scar; Fakeguido; Taiko; Sky Rompiendo

Bad Gyal chronology
Sound System: The Final Releases (2021)	La joia (2024)	Más cara (2026)

Singles from La joia
- 1. "Sexy" Released: 14 July 2022; 2. "Sin Carné" Released: 6 October 2022; 3. "Real G" Released: 2 December 2022; 4. "Chulo pt. 2" Released: 21 June 2023; 5. "Mi Lova" Released: 7 July 2023; 6. "Give Me" Released: 15 December 2023; 7. "Bota Niña" Released: 12 January 2024; 8. "Perdió Este Culo" Released: 26 January 2024

La joia (Note: In Central Catalan, which is the dialect spoken by Bad Gyal, La joia is pronounced [lə ˈʒɔjə].) (Catalan for 'The Jewel') is the debut studio album by Spanish singer-songwriter Bad Gyal. It was released on 26 January 2024 through Universal Music Latino and Interscope Records. It marks her first full body of work in over two years, following the extended play (EP) Sound System: The Final Releases (2021). The album was produced by a wide array of producers such as Merca Bae, Caleb Calloway, Nely el Arma Secreta, Scott Storch, el Guincho, Mag, Jasper Harris, Nuviala, Fakeguido, Taiko, and Sky Rompiendo, among others. It features appearances from Myke Towers, Anitta, Tommy Lee Sparta, Ñengo Flow, Tokischa, Young Miko, Morad, and Quevedo.

After releasing several mixtapes and EPs, La joia is Bad Gyal's fifth release overall. It is supported by eight singles: "Sexy", "Sin carné", "Real G", "Chulo pt. 2", "Mi Lova", "Give Me", "Bota niña", and "Perdió este culo"; all of them were released between July 2022 and January 2024. The album peaked at number one in Spain, being her highest-charting album in the country. It was also certified gold in Spain and the United States, being her first full-length release in being certified in any country.

== Background ==
Prior to La joia, Bad Gyal released the three-song EP Sound System: The Final Releases on 9 December 2021. In early 2022, she travelled to Miami to work with different producers for what would become her debut album. She recorded with producers she had worked in previous singles such as Scott Storch ("Zorra" and "Slim Thick"), Supa Dups ("Nueva York (tot*)"), and Nely el Arma Secreta ("Judas").

In February 2023, she gave concerts in Barcelona and Madrid at the Palau Sant Jordi and the WiZink Center, respectively. During said concerts, she revealed the name of the album as a "gift for the fans" and shared a potential tracklist, which included possible collaborations with Argentine singer Nicki Nicole and Puerto Rican rapper Ñengo Flow, these collaborations ended up being the non-album single "Enamórate" with the former and the album track "Bad Boy" with the latter. In an interview with V, she commented that "what my fans can expect this year is my debut album that will have songs that'll make them move. It'll have a lot of different genres, and it'll be a mix of styles and experiments [that] I always like to do."

In November 2023, the album was announced to be released on January of the following year through a teaser video uploaded to Bad Gyal's YouTube channel. Later in the year, on 13 December, she announced via her Instagram account, the album's official release date, tracklist, cover, and featured artists.

== Promotion ==
On 22 May 2022, Bad Gyal embarked on a tour titled La Joia Tour, which started with a concert at the Auditori Atrium in Viladecans, Spain. The tour included concerts in several cities in Spain and the United States, as well as different countries of Latin America such as Brazil, Argentina, Chile, and Mexico, as a part of the Primavera Sound music festival.

At the Latin American Music Awards of 2023, celebrated on 20 April 2023 in Las Vegas, she performed "Chulo", making her first musical appearance at an international awards show. Through 2023, she continued performing concerts, later announcing several concerts through Spain, the United States, and Latin America, as a part of La Joia 24 Karats Tour, a continuation of her previous tour.

=== Singles ===
The single "Sexy" was released on 14 July 2022. It was followed by "Sin carné", released on 6 October 2022. Both songs entered the songs chart in Spain peaking at numbers 62 and 35, respectively. "Sin carné" was certified gold in Spain. A music video for this song was directed by Manson, who had previously directed the videos for "Candela", "Zorra", and "Aprendiendo el sexo"; and produced by Canada. "Real G", a collaboration with rapper Quevedo, was first teased during a concert in Mexico City and released on 2 December 2022. It peaked at number 12 in Spain and was certified platinum in the country. The music video for the song was directed by Javier Peralvo and produced by Belledenuit.

On 10 February 2023, "Chulo" was released. It peaked at number 16 in Spain, and was certified 3× platinum in that country. A remix for the song, titled "Chulo pt. 2", was released on 21 June 2023 featuring rappers Tokischa and Young Miko. The music video was directed by Artasans and features the three women in a limousine, at a casino, and finally watching the sunrise on a beach after "having a wild girls' night out" in Barcelona. The remix was commercially successful in both the United States and Latin America. It peaked within the top ten in several countries, including Chile, Peru, and Nicaragua. It also peaked at number 33 and 89 on Billboard's Hot Latin Songs and Global 200 charts, respectively, being her highest-charting single on both charts since "Kármika", a collaboration with Karol G and Sean Paul. Additionally, the remix was certified platinum in the United States and gold in Mexico, being Bad Gyal's first single to be certified in any of the two countries. "Mi lova", a duet with Puerto Rican rapper Myke Towers, was released on 7 July 2023. The single peaked at number 21 in Spain and was certified platinum in the country, accompanied by a music video filmed in Las Vegas. "Give Me" was released on 15 December 2023 and peaked at number 49 in Spain.

"Bota niña", a duet with Brazilian singer Anitta, was released on 12 January 2024 and peaked at number 86 in Spain. The last single of the album, "Perdió este culo", was released along with the album on 26 January 2024. A music video was released for the song, directed by Félix Bollaín and starring Spanish actor Martiño Rivas. "Perdió este culo" peaked at number 15 in Spain. On 23 May 2024, a remixed version of the single, featuring Puerto Rican rapper Ivy Queen, was released with an accompanying music video, the titled shortened to simply "Perdió". The remix features different harmonies and ad-libs and additional bars from Ivy Queen, in-place of the original track's final bars.

== Critical reception ==
Professional ratings
Review scores
Source	Rating
Jenesaispop	4/5 stars
Mondo Sonoro	6/10
Mor.bo	8/10
The Guardian	3/5 stars
La Vanguardia	2/5 stars

Writing for Jenesaispop, Jordi Bardaji gave La joia four out of five stars, listing "Perdió este culo", "Mi lova", "Give Me", and "Chulo pt. 2" as highlights. He wrote that in the album, Bad Gyal "stays absolutely true to herself, little by little tightening the nuts, taking a step forward without anyone noticing." In a review for Mondo Sonoro, Pablo Tocino gave the album a score of six out of ten and described it as "concoction with better packaging than content, and with some moments of brilliance that in the end make it worth diving into many generic moments" and stated that it is a "good summary of her career in recent years." In a mixed review, Kitty Empire from The Observer gave the album three out of five stars, calling it "one frisky Latin banger after another". In a negative review for La Vanguardia, Esteban Linés gave the album two out of five stars and described it as "linear and repetitive", stating that Bad Gyal's proposal "swings between different sensory inputs, starting with the visual, then the textual and with the strictly musical input not always in a preeminent place."

== Commercial performance ==
La joia debuted at number two at the Spanish Albums chart, being her highest-charting album in the list, surpassing the 2021 EP Warm Up, which peaked at number five. Upon the release of the album, five tracks entered the Spain Song Chart: "Perdió este culo" at 15, "Bad Boy" at 51, "Skit" at 66, "Así soy" at 78, and "La que no se mueva" at 90.

After three weeks at number two and one at number three at the Spanish Albums chart, the album finally achieved the top position in its fifth week, being Bad Gyal's first number one album in her home country. The album was also certified gold in Spain and the United States.

== Track listing ==
La joia track listing
No.	Title	Writer(s)	Producer(s)	Length
1.	"Intro"	Alba Farelo; Merca Bae; Fakeguido	Merca Bae	1:09
2.	"Mi lova" (featuring Myke Towers)	Farelo; Michael Towers; Jeremy Ayala; Caleb Calloway; Andrea de Castro; Alejandro Ramírez; Jorge Pizarro	Merca Bae; SHB; Ayala; Calloway	3:39
3.	"Give Me"	Farelo; Nely el Arma Secreta; Scott Storch	Nely; Storch; Illa	2:45
4.	"Bota niña" (featuring Anitta)	Farelo; Larissa de Macedo; Gabriel do Borel; LNK; Danny Wolf; Fagu; Pablo Díaz-Reixa	El Guincho; Do Borel; LNK; Wolf	3:29
5.	"La que no se mueva" (featuring Tommy Lee Sparta)	Farelo; Mag	Mag	3:27
6.	"Perdió este culo"	Farelo; Mag	Mag	2:39
7.	"Sin Carné"	Farelo; Díaz-Reixa; Jasper Harris	El Guincho; Harris	1:57
8.	"Bad Boy" (featuring Ñengo Flow)	Farelo; Edwin Vázquez; Lil Geniuz	Lil Geniuz	3:25
9.	"Skit"	Merca Bae; SHB; Fakeguido	Merca Bae	1:32
10.	"Chulo pt. 2" (featuring Tokischa and Young Miko)	Farelo; Tokischa Peralta; María Ramírez de Arellano; Marco Borrero; Mag; Mauro; Ramírez	Mag; Mauro^{[a]}	3:38
11.	"Así soy" (featuring Morad)	Farelo; Morad El Khattouti; SHB; Nuviala; Scar	SHB; Nuviala; Scar	3:14
12.	"Sexy"	Farelo; Fakeguido	Fakeguido; Sohaib Temssamani^{[a]}; Nuviala^{[a]}	2:39
13.	"Pop Pop"	Farelo; Storch; Josias de la Cruz	Nely; Illa; Storch	2:13
14.	"Real G" (featuring Quevedo)	Farelo; Pedro Domínguez; Ramírez	Taiko; Sky Rompiendo; Merca Bae	3:11
15.	"Otra vez más"	Farelo; Ramírez	Sky	2:33
Total length:				41:30

Notes

- ^{^a} signifies an additional producer

== Personnel ==
=== Vocals ===
- Bad Gyal – vocals (all tracks)
- Myke Towers – vocals (track 2)
- Anitta – vocals (track 4)
- Tommy Lee Sparta – vocals (track 5)
- Ñengo Flow – vocals (tracks 8, 9)
- Tokischa – vocals (track 10)
- Young Miko – vocals (track 10)
- Morad – vocals (track 11)
- Quevedo – vocals (track 14)

=== Technical ===
- Earcandy – mixing (tracks 1, 3, 4, 8, 9, 13)
- Mike Fuller – mastering (tracks 1, 3, 4, 9, 13)
- Mag – mixing (tracks 5, 6)
- Colin Leonard – mastering (tracks 5, 6, 10)
- Jaycen Joshua – mixing, mastering (tracks 7, 11, 12)
- El Guincho – recording (track 7)
- Brian Hernández – mixing, mastering (track 14)
- Jorge Alamo – recording (track 14)
- Xavier Martínez – engineering (track 14)
- Alejandro Adrián Silva Mateos – engineering (track 14)
- Sergio Vicente – mixing assistance (track 14)
- Esteban Higuita Estrada – mixing, mastering (track 15)

== Charts ==
=== Weekly charts ===
Weekly chart performance for La joia
Chart (2024–2025)	Peak position
Spanish Albums (PROMUSICAE)	1

=== Year-end charts ===
2024 year-end chart performance for La joia
Chart (2024)	Position
Spanish Albums (PROMUSICAE)	13
Spanish Vinyls (PROMUSICAE)	100

== Certifications ==
Certifications for La joia
Region	Certification	Certified units/sales
Spain (Promusicae)	Platinum	40,000^{‡}
United States (RIAA)	Gold (Latin)	30,000^{‡}
^{‡} Sales+streaming figures based on certification alone.

== Release history ==
Release formats for La joia
Region	Date	Format	Label	Ref.
Various	26 January 2024	Digital download; streaming	Universal Latino; Interscope	
Spain	23 February 2024	CD	Universal Latino; Interscope	
Spain	15 March 2024	LP	Universal Latino; Interscope	

== La joia: Bad Gyal ==
La joia: Bad Gyal is a 2024 documentary film directed by David Camarero. It was written by Laura Herrero. It follows Bad Gyal throughout the creation of the studio album La joia. The film premiered at the 22nd Festival In-Edit Barcelona on 23 October 2024.
