= Skit =

Skit may refer to:

- A short segment in a performance, such as:
  - Sketch comedy
  - Hip-hop skit
  - Puppet skit
  - Promo (professional wrestling)
- Skit note, parody of a banknote
- "Skit", a song by Bad Gyal from La joia, 2024

== See also ==
- Skete, a monastic community in Eastern Christianity
