= Así soy =

Así soy may refer to:

- Así soy, a 2004 album by Oscar D'León
- "Así soy", a song by Bad Gyal from La joia, 2024
