= Govana =

Govana may refer to:

- Yanga Govana, South African politician
- Megalopyge govana
- Pyralis govana
- Open the Door (Bad Gyal and Govana song)

== See also ==
- Govan
