= Real G =

Single by Bad Gyal and Quevedo 2022

Single by Bad Gyal and Quevedo

from the album La joia
- Language: Spanish
- Released: 2 December 2022
- Length: 3:11
- Label: Universal Latino; Interscope
- Songwriters: Alba Farelo; Alejandro Silva; Alejandro Ramírez; Nicolás Jaña; Pedro Domínguez
- Producers: Taiko; Sky Rompiendo; Merca Bae

Bad Gyal singles chronology
"Sin carné" (2022)	"Real G" (2022)	"Chulo" (2023)

Quevedo singles chronology
"Lacone" (2022)	"Real G" (2022)	"Playa del Inglés" (2022)

Music video
- "Real G" on YouTube

"Real G" is a song recorded by Spanish singer-songwriters Bad Gyal and Quevedo. It was released on 2 December 2022 through Universal Music Latino and Interscope Records as the third single from Bad Gyal's debut studio album, La joia (2024).

== Composition ==
"Real G" was written by Alba Farelo, Alejandro Silva, Alejandro Ramírez, Nicolás Jaña and Pedro Domínguez. It was composed in the key of A major with a tempo of 113 beats per minute.

== Music video ==
The accompanying music video for "Real G" was released along with the song and it was directed by Javier Peralvo.

== Charts ==
Weekly chart performance for "Real G"
Chart (2022)	Peak position
Spain (PROMUSICAE)	12

== Certifications ==
Certifications for "Real G"
Region	Certification	Certified units/sales
Spain (Promusicae)	Platinum	40,000^{‡}
^{‡} Sales+streaming figures based on certification alone.
