= Slow Wine Mixtape =

Mixtape by Bad Gyal
- Released: 9 November 2016
- Genres: Reggaeton; dancehall; hip hop
- Length: 25:24
- Languages: Spanish; English
- Producers: AC3; Faberoa; Fakeguido; King DouDou; Plata

Bad Gyal chronology
| Slow Wine Mixtape (2016) | Worldwide Angel (2018) |

Singles from Slow Wine Mixtape
- 1. "Mercadona" Released: 22 September 2016; 2. "Fiebre" Released: 21 November 2016

Slow Wine Mixtape is the debut mixtape by Spanish singer-songwriter Bad Gyal. It was released on 9 November 2016 independently. It was presented with two singles: "Mercadona" and "Fiebre". It features appearances from Ms Nina and Elvis KNK. Regarding the title of the mixtape, wine is in Jamaican Patois a type of dance similar to twerking.

== Critical reception ==
Professional ratings
Review scores
| Source | Rating |
|---|---|
| Jenesaispop | 8.5/10 |
| Mondo Sonoro | 8/10 |

Yeray S. Iborra of Mondo Sonoro stated that with Slow Wine, Bad Gyal "dissociates herself from the disruptive nature of trap to embrace what she always considered her musical origins: Jamaican music", and that "night, money or love are part of a concept that clashes with the purism of those who wanted to see in [her] a banner of political commitment."

== Commercial performance ==
According to El Portal de la Música, Slow Wine peaked at number 75 on the Spanish Streaming Albums chart. In Spain, "Mercadona" was certified gold, and "Fiebre", 4× platinum. "Fiebre" became one of Bad Gyal's signature songs. In November 2024, shortly before the eighth anniversary of the release of the song's music video, "Fiebre" entered the Spanish Songs chart at 96 and maintained the position for a week. It re-entered the chart in January 2025 at 93.

== Track listing ==
Slow Wine Mixtape track listing
| No. | Title | Producer(s) | Length |
|---|---|---|---|
| 1. | "D Way You Do Me" | Plata | 4:50 |
| 2. | "Despacio" (transl. "Slowly") (featuring Ms Nina) | AC3 | 2:39 |
| 3. | "Dinero" (transl. "Money") | Fakeguido | 3:58 |
| 4. | "Fiebre" (transl. "Fever") | King DouDou | 4:07 |
| 5. | "Mercadona" | Fakeguido | 3:23 |
| 6. | "Turn Me On" (featuring Elvis KNK) | Faberoa | 2:57 |
| 7. | "Smthin Like This" | Plata | 3:29 |
| Total length: | | | 25:24 |

== Personnel ==
- Bad Gyal – vocals
- Ms Nina – vocals (track 2)
- Elvis KNK – vocals (track 6)
- Plata – production (tracks 1, 7)
- AC3 – production (track 2)
- Fakeguido – production (tracks 3, 5)
- King DouDou – production (track 4)
- Faberoa – production (track 6)
- Darío Alva – artwork

== Charts ==
Weekly chart performance for Slow Wine Mixtape
| Chart (2016) | Peak position |
|---|---|
| Spanish Streaming Albums (PROMUSICAE) | 75 |

== Release history ==
Release formats for Slow Wine Mixtape
| Region | Date | Format | Label | Ref. |
|---|---|---|---|---|
| Various | 9 November 2016 | Digital download; streaming | Self-released | |
