= Hookah (Bad Gyal song) =

2019 single by Bad Gyal

Single by Bad Gyal
- Language: Spanish
- Released: 19 July 2019
- Length: 3:00
- Label: Aftercluv; Interscope
- Songwriters: Alba Farelo; Alejandro Ramírez; Bigram Zayas; Dwayne Chin-Quee; Ender Zambrano
- Producers: Supa Dups; Sky Rompiendo; DVLP

Bad Gyal singles chronology
"Santa María" (2019)	"Hookah" (2019)	"Alocao" (2019)

Music video
- "Hookah" on YouTube

Audio sample
- file; help

"'Hookah" is a song recorded by Spanish singer-songwriter Bad Gyal. It was released on 19 July 2019 through Aftercluv Dance Lab and Interscope Records.

== Composition ==
"Hookah" was written by Alba Farelo, Alejandro Ramírez Suárez, Bigram Zayas, Dwayne Chin-Quee and Ender Zambrano. It was composed in the key of C major with a tempo of 104 beats per minute. Brendan Wetmore of Paper said, "'Hookah' has all the groove of [Bad Gyal's] previous songs, but with a boosted barrage of reggaeton drums and clicks to punctuate the blisteringly anthemic chorus."

== Music video ==
The accompanying music video for "Hookah" was released along with the song and it was directed by Miguel Ángulo.

== Charts ==
=== Weekly charts ===
Weekly chart performance for "Hookah"
Chart (2019)	Peak position
Nicaragua (Monitor Latino)	11
Nicaragua Urbano (Monitor Latino)	9
Spain (PROMUSICAE)	55

=== Year-end charts ===
2019 year-end chart performance for "Hookah"
Chart (2019)	Position
Nicaragua Urbano (Monitor Latino)	83

== Certifications ==
Certifications for "Hookah"
Region	Certification	Certified units/sales
Spain (Promusicae)	Platinum	40,000^{‡}
^{‡} Sales+streaming figures based on certification alone.
