= Double Team (song) =

Single by Anitta, Brray and Bad Gyal

from the album Funk Generation
- Language: Spanish; Portuguese
- Released: 21 March 2024
- Genre: Trap; dancehall
- Length: 3:51
- Label: Floresta; Republic; Universal Latin
- Songwriters: Larissa Machado; Alba Sole; Bryan Garcia; Eduardo Vargas; Elvin Roubert-Rodriguez; Kenneth Vargas; Roberto Félix
- Producer: Botlok

Anitta singles chronology
"Faldas y Gistros" (2024)	"Double Team" (2024)	"Um Por Cento (Un x100to)" (2024)

Brray singles chronology
"Te Colaboro" (2024)	"Double Team" (2024)

Bad Gyal singles chronology
"Perdió Este Culo" (2024)	"Double Team" (2024)	"Sexe Sexy" (2024)

Music video
- "Double Team" on YouTube

"Double Team" is a song by Brazilian singer and songwriter Anitta, Puerto Rican rapper Brray, and Spanish singer Bad Gyal. The song was recorded for Anitta's sixth studio album, Funk Generation (2024). It was released as the fourth single from the album on March 21, 2024, through Floresta Records, Republic Records, and Universal Latin Entertainment. "Double Team" is a trap song with elements of dancehall. Its lyrics focus on self-confidence and the freedom to indulge in uninhibited fun. The song was written by the performers themselves, along with Eduardo Vargas, Elvin Jesus Roubert-Rodriguez, Kenneth Vargas, and Roberto Félix.

== Live performances ==
Anitta and Brray performed "Double Team" for the first time on April 25, 2024, at the 2024 Latin American Music Awards.

== Tracks and Formats ==
No.	Title	Writer(s)	Length
1.	"Double Team"	Anitta; Alba Sole; Bryan Garcia; Eduardo Vargas; Elvin Jesus Roubert-Rodriguez; Kenneth Vargas; Roberto Félix	3:51

== Charts ==
Chart performance for "Double Team"
Chart (2024)	Peak position
Brazil Hot 100 (Billboard)	50
Portugal (AFP)	117
