= Worldwide Angel =

Mixtape by Bad Gyal
- Released: 23 February 2018
- Genres: Reggaeton; dancehall; pop; EDM
- Length: 29:31
- Languages: Spanish; Catalan (Note: Vocals in "Yo sigo iual".); English
- Labels: Puro; Canada
- Producers: El Guincho; Fakeguido; Dubbel Dutch; D33J; Faberoa; Florentino; Jam City; Paul Marmota

Bad Gyal chronology
Slow Wine Mixtape (2016)	Worldwide Angel (2018)	Warm Up (2021)

Singles from Worldwide Angel
- 1. "Blink" Released: 2 February 2018; 2. "Candela" Released: 20 March 2018; 3. "Internationally" Released: 29 June 2018; 4. "Yo sigo iual" Released: 22 November 2018

Worldwide Angel is the second mixtape by Spanish singer-songwriter Bad Gyal. It was released on 23 February 2018 by Puro Records and Canada Editorial. A 10-minute version of the album, mixed and edited by Rudeteo, was released along with the album on Bad Gyal's YouTube channel.

== Critical reception ==
Professional ratings
Review scores
Source	Rating
Crack	7/10
Pitchfork	6.2/10
Rolling Stone Argentina	2.5/5 stars

Philip Sherburne of Pitchfork stated that Worldwide Angel "largely sticks to the template established on previous Bad Gyal songs: synth-heavy, sticky-sweet dembow grooves tinged with airy melancholy", and "is clearly meant to signal [her] arrival as a global force." Sherburne found her melodies "often about as emphatic as a shrug", and noted that her lyrics "seem hesitant to stray far from themes she's already explored." Vibe included Worldwide Angel among the 18 Best Latinx Albums of 2018, with Clarissa Shine describing its melodies as "an excellent combination of those uptempo reggae beats with the sultriness of Spanish lyrics". Shine described its title as "self-explanatory ... for how Bad Gyal intends to become an international star, especially with the distinct sound created on this project."

Trimester- and year-end lists rankings for Worldwide Angel
Publication	Accolade	Rank	Ref.
Fact	The 25 Best Albums of the Last Three Months: January to March 2018	Unranked	
Jenesaispop	The Best Albums of 2018	16	
Mondo Sonoro	The Best National Albums of 2018	16	
Vibe	18 Best Latinx Albums of 2018	Unranked	
Vinyl Me, Please	The 10 Best Electronic Albums of 2018	Unranked	

== Commercial performance ==
Worldwide Angel peaked at number 11 on the Spanish Streaming Albums chart. In 2024, "Candela" was certified gold in Spain.

== Track listing ==
Worldwide Angel track listing
No.	Title	Writer(s)	Producer(s)	Length
1.	"Intro" (featuring Jam City and el Guincho)	Alba Farelo; Jack Latham	El Guincho; Jam City	0:36
2.	"Internationally" (featuring Jam City and Dubbel Dutch)	Farelo; Latham; Joaquín Bartra; Marc Glasser	Dubbel Dutch; el Guincho; Jam City	3:14
3.	"Tra" (featuring Dubbel Dutch)	Farelo; Bartra; Glasser	Dubbel Dutch	3:45
4.	"Yo sigo iual" (transl. "I'm Still the Same") (featuring Fakeguido and el Guincho)	Farelo; Pablo Martínez	El Guincho; Fakeguido	3:09
5.	"Candela" (transl. "Fire") (featuring Dubbel Dutch)	Farelo; Bartra; Glasser	Dubbel Dutch	3:16
6.	"Trust" (featuring Faberoa, Fakeguido and el Guincho)	Farelo; Juan Ignacio Torres Ramos; Martínez	Faberoa; Fakeguido	3:43
7.	"Blink" (featuring Florentino)	Farelo; Yeshe Beesley	Florentino	4:31
8.	"Tu moto" (transl. "Your Motorcycle") (featuring D33J))	Farelo; Djavan Santos; Bartra	D33J	3:15
9.	"Realize" (featuring Paul Marmota and Fakeguido)	Farelo; Martínez; Paul Marmota	Marmota; Fakeguido	3:58
Total length:				29:31

== Personnel ==
- Alba Farelo – vocals
- Faberoa – vocals (track 6)
- El Guincho – production (tracks 1, 2, 4); mixing
- Jam City – production (tracks 1, 2)
- Dubbel Dutch – production (tracks 2, 3, 5)
- Fakeguido – production (tracks 4, 6, 9)
- Faberoa – production (track 6)
- Florentino – production (track 7)
- D33J – production (track 8)
- Paul Marmota – production (track 9)
- Vlado Meller – mastering
- Alejandro Sonoro – artwork

== Charts ==
=== Weekly charts ===
Weekly chart performance for Worldwide Angel
Chart (2018)	Peak position
Spanish Streaming Albums (PROMUSICAE)	11

=== Year-end charts ===
2018 year-end chart performance for Worldwide Angel
Chart (2018)	Position
Spanish Streaming Albums (PROMUSICAE)	97

== Release history ==
Release formats for Worldwide Angel
Region	Date	Format	Label	Ref.
Various	23 February 2018	Digital download; streaming	Puro; Canada	
