= Mushkaa =

Spanish singer (born 2004)

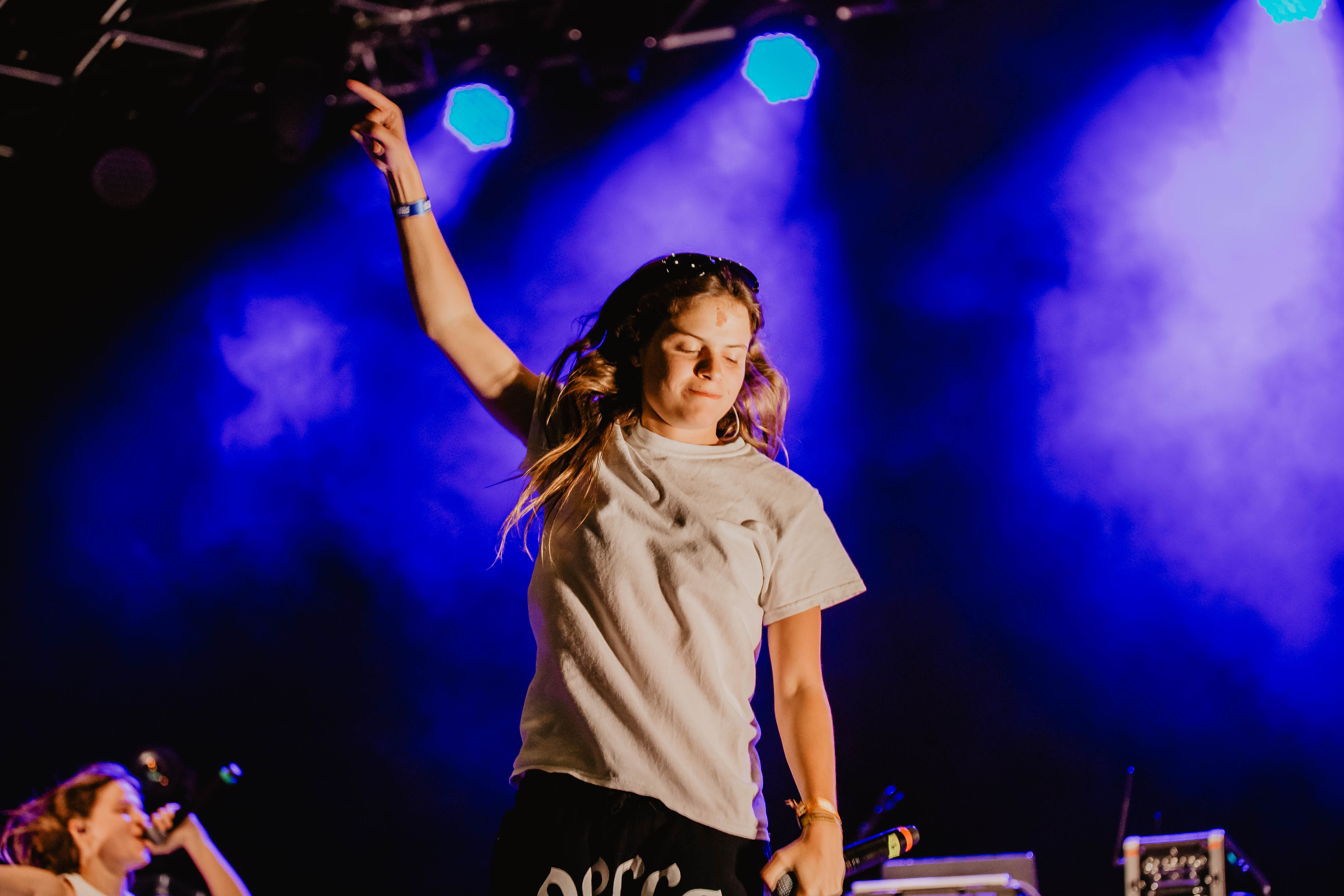
- Mushkaa in 2023
- Born: Irma Farelo i Solé; 13 April 2004 (age 21); Vilassar de Mar, Catalonia, Spain
- Education: Santa Cecilia Academy
- Father: Eduard Farelo
- Relatives: Bad Gyal (sister)
- Musical career
- Genres: Reggae; Trap; R&B; Urban
- Instrument: Vocals
- Years active: 2021–present
- Website: mushkaa.com

Irma Farelo i Solé (born 13 April 2004), known professionally as Mushkaa, is a Catalan urban singer.

== Early life and education ==
Irma Farelo i Solé is the daughter of television personality Eduard Farelo and manager Eva Solé, and was born in Barcelona's Vilassar de Mar on 13 April 2004. She has four siblings: Greta Farelo, her twin sister, who helps her sing and performs with the group in live concerts; Paula, Bruno as well as Alba, better known as the singer Bad Gyal.

Since Mushkaa was young she had a love for music, and she spent ten years studying trumpet. She later started attending the Music Workshop in Barcelona in 2023, but was forced to quit since she struggled to balance her studies with her musical career.

Mushkaa has discussed her own homosexuality in relation to her music, saying, "I always sing about girls when I make a more personal track, but that's because I like girls. It's unavoidable. It would be strange if it were the other way around." She said she does not often come across homophobic people in her daily life, saying, "In my generation, if someone is homophobic they are the idiot of the group".

== Music career ==
In 2021, Mushkaa started her professional career. "Res Kla" was the first song she published, and it has received 100,000 listens on Spotify. She has worked with some of the most well-known musicians in the Catalan music scene, including The Tyets, 31 FAM, and Flashy Ice Cream in Bona Vida. Furthermore, it appeared as though his 2023 single was a hoax when it went popular on TikTok and reached the 17th spot among the country's most listened to songs on Spotify with over 200,000 listens.

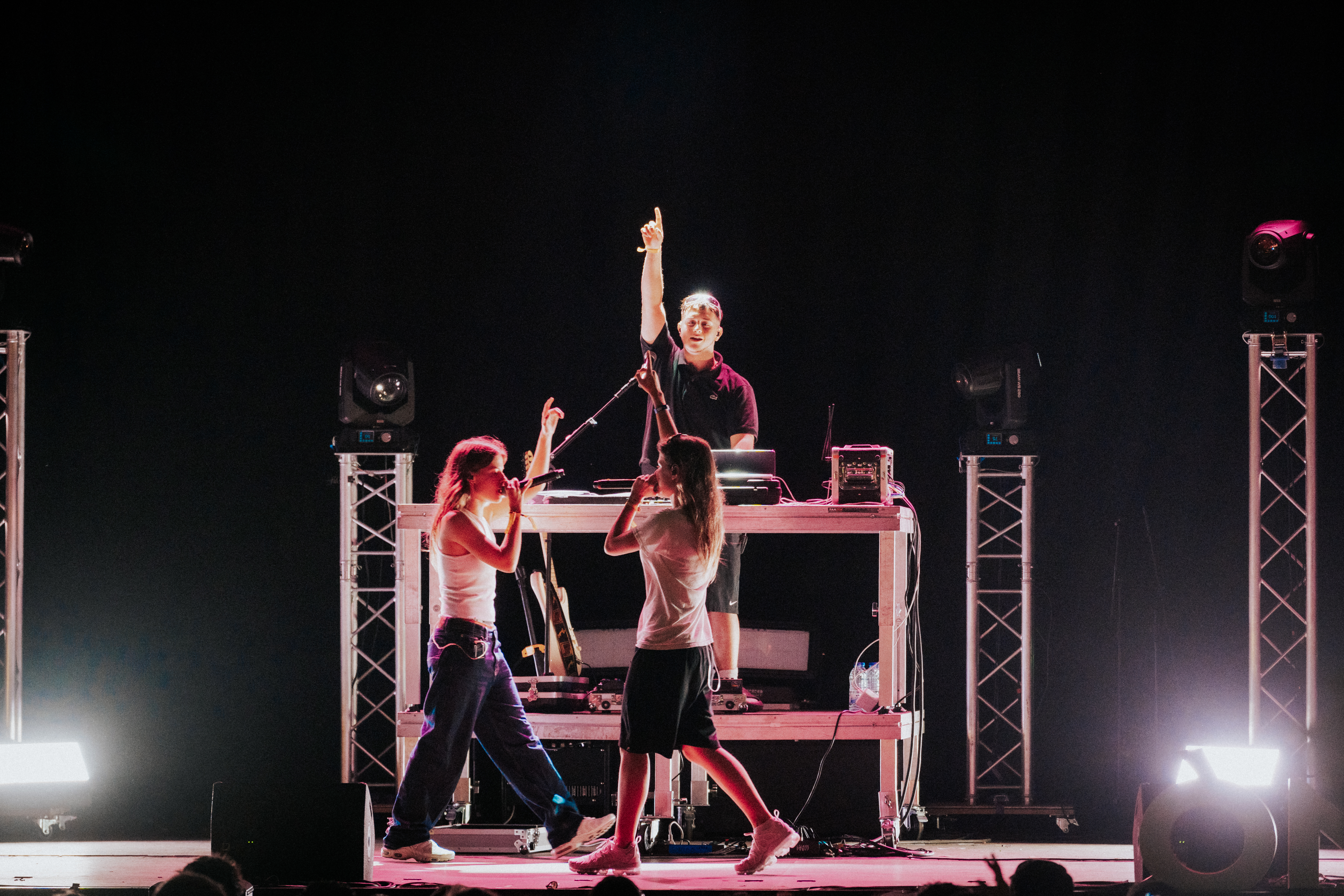
Mushkaa, Greta Farelo and Roots performing at Festival Límbic 2023

Mushkaa had her debut at the Clap rock band in Mataró in June 2022. The following month, she gave a performance at the SantJu Trap festival in the Girona region, where she appeared among musicians such as Baya Baye, Pol Bordas, Dora Mangara, Spxxn P, and Tramma on a poster. A week later, she attended the Maleducats festival, where she sang her debut song at the table with Roots, Greta Farelo as the vocalist, and two dancers (Gabi and Anna) as the show's entertainment.

In 2023, when Mushkaa began her studies at the Music Workshop, she was able to sell all her concert tickets in two weeks for the Sidecar band event in Barcelona. It was also announced for that year's Porta Ferrada Festival, where it was joined by La Pegatina, Macaco, El Pot Petit, Núria Graham, Blaumut, Niña Pastori, and Mishima, among others. She also took part in the Strenes Urbana, a new Strenes Festival segment featuring up-and-coming urban music, performing with musicians including Figo Flawas, Lal'Ba, Scorpio, Mama Dousha, Ceaxe, and Lildami. Produced by Roots and Bexnil, she dropped her debut EP, Tas Loko Mixtape, on 14 April 2023.

"Best Urban Music Album" was the Enderrock award given to her self-published album at the Premis de la Música Catalana 2024. "Best Revealing Artist" was another award that she took home from the same festival. She sang as one of the vocalists in the Fiestas de La Mercè in Barcelona in September, drawing an audience of over 18,000 spectators. She participated in the TV3-televised performances at Barcelona's Forum Park as part of the La Marató solidarity event in December. Alongside her on stage were performers from the Catalan urban scene including Julieta, The Tyets, and Figa Flawas.

Mushkaa released her second EP, Sexy Sensible, on 18 January 2024. Bexnil and Roots are the producers of nine of the album's tracks. With a mix of Spanish and Catalan lines, "SexeSexy" is the first joint single by Mushkaa and Bad Gyal. On 13 March, the Farelo sisters posted a video on TikTok interpreting a portion of the song, announcing the premiere. However, because of the songs' graphic language, the clip was taken down from the platform. The last track on Mushkaa's debut studio album, "SexySensible," is "SexeSexy." She performed twice at the Sala Apolo in Barcelona in February 2024, marking the beginning of a new tour showcasing the EP.

== Artistry ==
Mushkaa's genre of choice is described as "daring reggaeton and sad music." Rap, dancehall, R&B, and reggaeton are all combined in it. Nonetheless, he believes that his art is "nostalgic and sensitive" within the urban genre. She began writing as a kind of self-therapy and frequently writes about events that have happened to her or to others close to her. Though he utilises English and Spanish barbarisms that she claimed are a result of the language's natural progression, she sings in Catalan.

Videos show people dressed in athletic clothing with a "flow Mushkaa" dress design. Yung Beef, Albany, Soto Asa, Kaydy Cain, and even Joan Manuel Serrat, Estopa, and indie music are some of her inspirations. Her tracks are produced by Roots, who also collaborate with Kate and Basement Studio on musical endeavors like The Tyets, Andén, Doble, and Santa Salut.

== Discography ==
Year	Name	Album	Notes
2021	"Res Kla"	Single non-album	
2022	"Bello Bellako"	Single non-album	
2022	"Punt de Mira"	Single non-album	
2022	"Good life"	Single non-album	
2022	"SONIC"	Single non-album	
2022	"NO XDONA"	Single non-album	
2022	"BLESSINGS"	Single non-album	
2022	"THE 15 (PQ STAS TRISTE)"	Single non-album	
2023	"Tas Loko Mixtape"	Single non-album	
2023	"Diabla"	Single non-album	featuring Figa Flawas
2023	"El Mambo"	Single non-album	
2023	"No m'estima +"	Single non-album	featuring Julieta Gracián
2023	"TEMPS"	Single non-album	with Maria Hein
2023	"Between the smoke"	Single non-album	
2023	"Bandûlera"	Single non-album	featuring Luana Figueredo and Aleesha
2023	"PURR PURR PURR"	Single non-album	featuring Delgao
2023	"Spavila"	Single non-album	featuring Delgao
2023	"Tas Loko"	Las Toko	
2023	"Bello Bellaco"	Las Toko	
2023	"Barras Warras"	Las Toko	featuring Calagher
2023	"Sembla Mentida"	Las Toko	
2023	"Punt De Mira"	Las Toko	featuring blau, jovedry and Andana
2023	"Turra Malvada"	Las Toko	
2024	"SexySensible (Intro)"	SexySensible	
2024	"Sẽnal de Respeto"	SexySensible	featuring Greta
2024	"El Disfraz"	SexySensible	
2024	"Xarnega"	SexySensible	featuring Bexnil
2024	"SexeSexy"	SexySensible	featuring Bad Gyal and Bexnil
2024	"Imperio"	SexySensible	
2024	"habibi"	SexySensible	featuring Bexnil
2024	"Turra Malvada"	SexySensible	featuring Akilon 340 and Negro Dub
2024	"Entre el Fum"	SexySensible	
2024	"The Costume"	Single non-album	

== Awards and recognitions ==
Award	Year	Category	Nominated work	Result
Premis de la Música Catalana	2024	Best Urban Music Album	Tas Loko Mixtape	Won
Premis de la Música Catalana	2024	Best Revealing Artist	Tas Loko Mixtape	Won
