= Aprendiendo el sexo =

2020 single by Bad Gyal

Single by Bad Gyal

from the EP Warm Up
- Language: Spanish
- English title: 'Learning Sex'
- A-side: "Zorra"
- Released: 31 July 2020
- Length: 2:27
- Label: Aftercluv; Interscope
- Songwriters: Alba Farelo; Pablo Díaz-Reixa; Pablo Martínez; Pau Riutort
- Producers: El Guincho; Rawsanches; Fakeguido

Bad Gyal singles chronology
"Bom bom" (2020)	"Aprendiendo el sexo" (2020)	"Blin blin" (2020)

Music video
- "Aprendiendo el sexo" on YouTube

Audio sample
- file; help

"Aprendiendo el sexo" (Spanish for 'Learning Sex') is a song recorded by Spanish singer-songwriter Bad Gyal. It was released on 31 July 2020 through Aftercluv Dance Lab and Interscope Records as the first single from Bad Gyal's debut extended play (EP), Warm Up (2021).

== Composition ==
"Aprendiendo el sexo" was written by Alba Farelo, Pablo Díaz-Reixa, Pablo Martínez and Pau Riutort. It was composed in the key of E minor with a tempo of 98 beats per minute.

== Music video ==
The accompanying music video for "Aprendiendo el sexo" was released along with the song and it was directed by Manson.

== Charts ==
Weekly chart performance for "Aprendiendo el sexo"
Chart (2020)	Peak position
Spain (PROMUSICAE)	29

== Certifications ==
Certifications for "Aprendiendo el sexo"
Region	Certification	Certified units/sales
Spain (Promusicae)	Gold	20,000^{‡}
^{‡} Sales+streaming figures based on certification alone.

== Release history ==
Release history and formats for "Aprendiendo el sexo"
Region	Date	Format	Label	Ref.
Various	31 July 2020	Digital download; streaming	Aftercluv; Interscope	
Spain	5 March 2021	10" vinyl	Aftercluv; Interscope	
