= Sound System: The Final Releases =

EP by Bad Gyal
- Released: 9 December 2021
- Length: 7:18
- Language: Spanish
- Label: Universal Latino; Interscope
- Producer: El Guincho; Ricky Blaze; Supa Dups; Alejandro Armes; DJ Nelson; Arkey-O; Scott Storch; SickDrumz

Bad Gyal chronology
| Warm Up (2021) | Sound System: The Final Releases (2021) | La joia (2024) |

Singles from Sound System: The Final Releases
- 1. "Nueva York (tot*)" Released: 26 November 2021; 2. "Su payita (gramos)" Released: 3 December 2021; 3. "Slim Thick" Released: 10 December 2021

Sound System: The Final Releases is the second extended play (EP) by Spanish singer-songwriter Bad Gyal. It was released on 9 December 2021 through Universal Music Latino and Interscope Records. It was produced by el Guincho, Ricky Blaze, Supa Dups, Alejandro Armes, DJ Nelson, Arkey-O, Scott Storch and SickDrumz. The EP consists of three unreleased fan-favorite songs that appeared in various of her concerts.

== Background ==
Following the tour SoundSystem, Bad Gyal announced in November 2021 that she would release some songs that her fans had been asking for the past three years. The EP consists in three songs that she had previously performed on various of her concerts, the songs were well received by her fans and inspired her to record and release them as a project. The songs were conceived during recording sessions for other projects in Miami and Los Angeles. "Su payita (gramos)" was created mixing two different songs: "Gramos", produced by Arkey-O, and "Muro", produced by DJ Nelson.

The first single was "Nueva York (tot*)", released on 26 November 2021. The second single was "Su payita (gramos)", released on 3 December 2021. The third and last single was "Slim Thick", released on 10 December 2022. A music video directed by Ismael OkBye was released for the latter song.

== Reception ==
In a review for ABC, María Alcaraz commented that the project followed the formula of her previous releases, and that the EP "represents everything that Bad Gyal is: desire to dance, to have a good time and to brag a little."

Commercially, while the EP did not appear on the Spanish Albums chart, all three tracks charted at the Spanish Songs list. "Nueva York (tot*)" peaked at number five, being her third highest appearance on the chart. "Su payita (gramos)" and "Slim Thick" peaked at numbers 18 and 43, respectively. Additionally, "Nueva York (tot*)" and "Su payita (gramos)" were certified 2× platinum and gold, respectively, in Spain.

== Track listing ==
Sound System: The Final Releases track listing
| No. | Title | Writer(s) | Producer(s) | Length |
|---|---|---|---|---|
| 1. | "Nueva York (tot*)" | Alba Farelo; Pablo Díaz-Reixa; Ricky Blaze; Dwayne Chin-Quee | El Guincho; Ricky Blaze; Supa Dups | 2:34 |
| 2. | "Su payita (gramos)" | Farelo; Díaz-Reixa; Alejandro Armes; Armando Santos; Nelson Díaz Martínez; Arkey-O | El Guincho; Armes; DJ Nelson; Arkey-O | 2:20 |
| 3. | "Slim Thick" | Farelo; Díaz-Reixa; Scott Storch; SickDrumz | El Guincho; Scott Storch; SickDrumz | 2:24 |
| Total length: | | | | 7:18 |

== Release history ==
Release formats for Sound System: The Final Releases
| Region | Date | Format | Label | Ref. |
|---|---|---|---|---|
| Various | 9 December 2021 | Digital download; streaming | Universal Latino; Interscope | |
