= Tommy Lee Sparta =

Jamaican dancehall musician (born 1987)

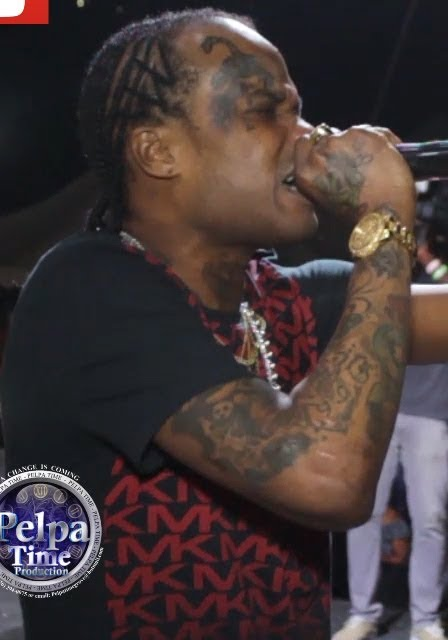
- Tommy Lee Sparta in 2018

Background information
- Also known as: Tommy Lee; Uncle Demon; Guzu; Lord Luci Godfather; Sparta
- Born: Leroy Russell Junior; 4 November 1987 (age 38); Montego Bay, Jamaica
- Genres: Dancehall; reggae; rock fusion; EDM
- Occupations: Deejay; singer; lyricist; songwriter; record producer
- Instrument: Guitar
- Years active: 2007–present
- Labels: Da Wiz/snipa (2008–2010); Adidjahiem (2010–2012); Guzu Musiq (2013–present)

Leroy Russell Junior (born 4 November 1987), better known by his stage names Tommy Lee and Tommy Lee Sparta, is a Jamaican dancehall artist from Flankers, Montego Bay, Jamaica. Tommy Lee Sparta gained popularity as a member of Adidjahiem Records and the associated Portmore Empire crew under the leadership of Vybz Kartel. He has been a controversial figure in dancehall due to his self-described "Gothic Dancehall" style, which often features dark and Satanist-inspired subject matter.

== Career ==
Tommy Lee Sparta began deejaying in late 2007 at Snipa Studios in Flankers, where he recorded his first song, "Spartan Story." During this time, he performed as an opening act for local shows, including several from Portmore artist Vybz Kartel. Kartel, noticing that the artist was receiving positive responses from the crowd, invited him to move to Kingston and become a part of the Portmore Empire, Kartel's music crew. Tommy Lee Sparta, however, was reluctant to leave his family and neighborhood, and declined the offer.

According to Tommy Lee Sparta, it wasn't until his performance at Vybz Kartel's Birthday Bash on 7 January 2010 that he decided to take the idea of being a musician seriously, and he soon accepted the offer to become an official member of the Portmore Empire crew. "Warn Dem," released in November 2010, was Tommy Lee Sparta's first recognized hit, based on a riddim by Da Wiz, his original producer from Snipa Studios. The accompanying music video, directed by Dk Konsepp, was also a first for the artist.

Tommy Lee Sparta's breakthrough hit came with "Some Bwoy (Link Pon Wi Chain)" on the 2011 So Bad Riddim. However, it was not until well after Kartel's arrest and the release of the music video in 2012, under new management from Junior "Heavy-D" Fraser, that the single gained traction. The single worked its way to the number one spot of many of Jamaica's informal music charts, including Pree Dis and Entertainment Report, and the video was in heavy rotation on Caribbean stations such as RETV, Hype TV, and Tempo Networks. "Some Bwoy," along with follow-up singles such as "Psycho," "Buss a Blank," and "Shook (Uncle Demon)," gave Tommy Lee Sparta significant exposure locally as well as internationally and in 2012 he was a headlining artist for both Reggae Sumfest in Montego Bay and the Sting music festival in Portmore.

In May 2012, Adidjahiem Records was shut down, citing the legal issues of owner Vybz Kartel and lack of ability to represent/promote artists as reasons for the closure. Shortly thereafter, Tommy Lee Sparta announced plans to launch a new label, PG 13, with former labelmate Gaza Slim.

In September 2012, Tommy Lee announced that he would be changing his stage name to Tommy Lee Sparta for trademark purposes, and to differentiate himself from Mötley Crüe drummer Tommy Lee and actor Tommy Lee Jones. The element "Sparta" was derived from an informal name given to the part of Flankers where he grew up. The move was suggested by his lawyer as a way to thwart potential copycat musicians from impersonating the artist.

Usain Bolt, Warren Weir and several other Jamaican sprinters have stated their appreciation of Tommy Lee Sparta and Adidjahiem Records, going so far as to flash the hand sign for the clique popularized by Tommy Lee Sparta after Jamaica won all three medals at the men's 200 metres in the 2012 Summer Olympics. In response, Tommy Lee Sparta released remixes for his songs "Psycho" and "Some Bwoy" with altered lyrics paying tribute to the Jamaican sprinters.

In 2012, Tommy Lee Sparta was given the Chart-topping Song of the Year award at Jamaica's Youth View awards for Psycho, in addition to nominations for Collaboration of the Year and Favorite Local Artiste (Male). In 2018, he entered the Billboard reggae albums top 10 chart at number 9 with his EP "New Creator." Tommy Lee Sparta was nominated in 2020 for an International Reggae and World Music award in the category of Best Dancehall Stagecraft Entertainer.

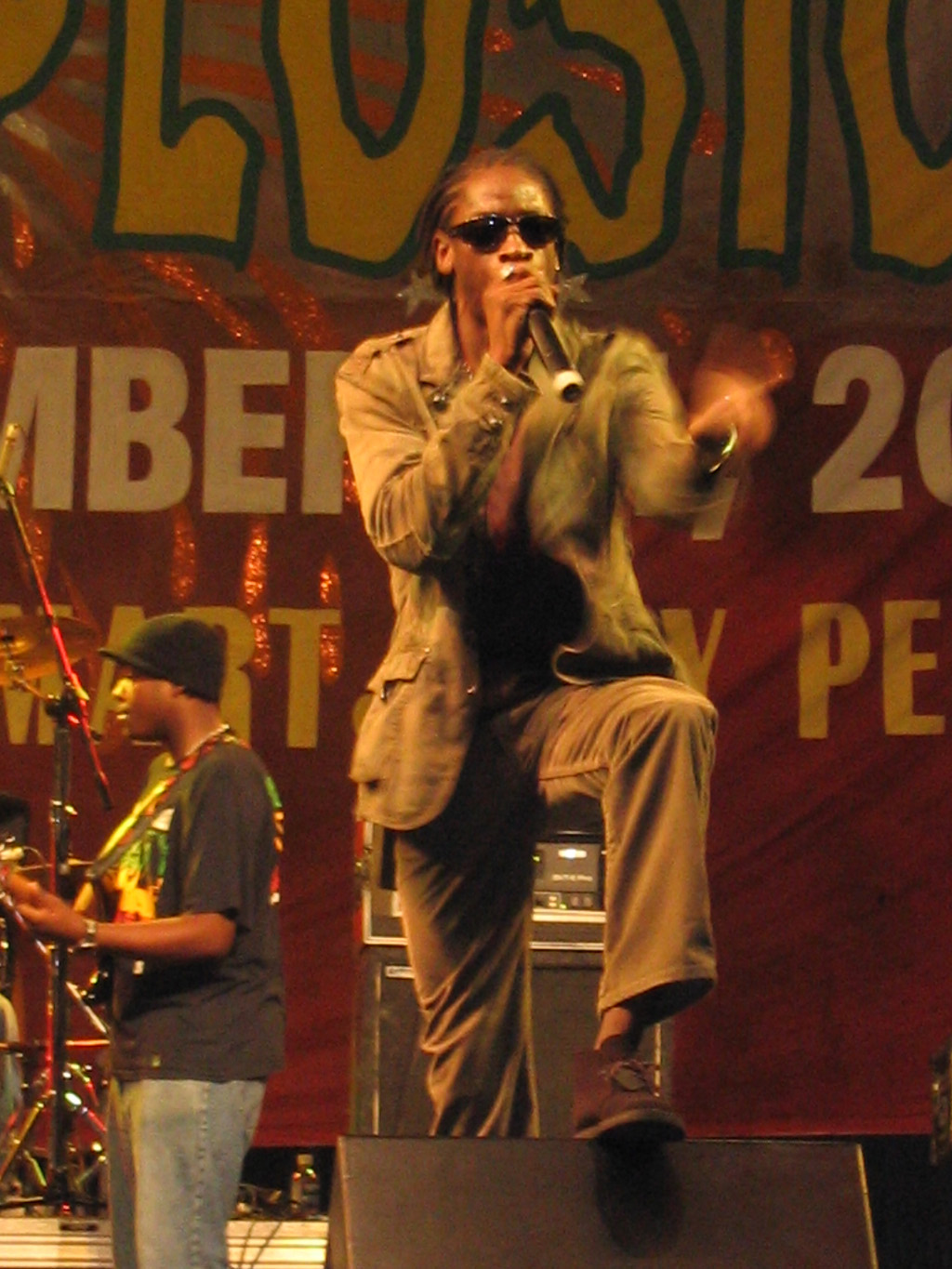
Deejay Bounty Killer in 2006

=== Bounty Killer feud ===
In September 2012, a feud formed between Tommy Lee Sparta and Alliance leader Bounty Killer over a series of Twitter posts that were perceived as an insult to Tommy Lee Sparta. One such message from Bounty Killer on 8 September said, "Christmas is 4 christ so nuh demon or devil cyaah win we a bloodclaat all a dem a dead a sting!!!" This was widely believed to be a reference to Tommy Lee Sparta's "Uncle Demon" persona and a threat against the artist regarding the upcoming Sting music festival on Boxing Day. Bounty Killer, however, denied that the tweet was directed towards Tommy Lee Sparta, stating that the message was against the devil and not any artist in particular. Tommy Lee Sparta said of the slight that he had great respect for the artist as an elder dancehall musician, and that as the statement was probably made to garner publicity, he would not respond with any disrespect.

However, just a little over a week later, Tommy Lee Sparta released the music video for a new diss track directed towards Bounty Killer entitled "Goat Head." Bounty Killer responded the next month with two diss songs of his own, "Di Gaad" and "Nyammy Lee." As a result of the growing feud, the two artists were slated to clash at the 2012 Sting music festival, with Bounty Killer comparing the matchup as equivalent to "a giant and an ant." However, when Sting's lead promoter, Isaiah Laing, implied that Tommy Lee Sparta might have a chance of defeating the veteran artist, Bounty Killer saw the remark as an insult and cancelled his performance. During Tommy Lee Sparta's performance at Sting, he expressed his support and respect for Bounty Killer, and both artists have since stated they consider the feud to be over.

== Personal life ==
Russell was born in 1987 and grew up in Flankers, an unofficial residential community located just east of Sangster International Airport in Montego Bay.

Russell obtained an American Visa in June 2014. He described his upbringing as difficult, having lost his father at the age of 9. Russell attended Anchovy High School in the nearby town of Anchovy. He had his first child at the age of 14 while he was in eighth grade with his high school sweetheart, Donna, who was then in the eleventh grade.

In February 2014, he was accused along with four others in connection with a lottery scam; the case was dismissed in 2018.

In March 2021, he pled guilty to illegal possession of a firearm and ammunition and was sentenced to three years in prison. He was released in March 2023.

== Discography ==
=== Extended plays ===
- 2012: "Pussy Mechanic" (UIM Records)
- 2012: "Gal Gimme Wine" (UIM Records)
- 2012: Psycho (Tad's Record Inc)
- 2012: Grim Reaper (UIM Records)
- 2013: Save Dem Soul (Da Wiz Records)
- 2013: "Bun Nu Nu" (UIM Records)
- 2012: Some Bwoy (Young Vibez Production)
- 2013: Spartan Soulja (Guzu musiq)
- 2014: "Dream" (UIM Records)
- 2015: "Big Bike" (UIM Records)
- 2015: "Rebirth" (UIM Records)
- 2017: "Diamond Blessings" (Damage musiq)
- 2018: "New Creator" (Ricardo Gowe Record)
- 2019: "Blessings" (damage musiq)
- 2019: "Under vibes" (Falmouth dinesty king records)
- 2019: "Rich badness" (herah musik production)
- 2020: "Procreator" (damage musiq)
- 2020: "Tattoo "(night owl musik)

=== LPs ===
- 2012: Grim Reaper – LP (UIM Records)
- 2012: Bay Badness – LP (UIM Records – TJ Records)
- 2013: Save Dem Soul – LP (UIM Records – Da Wiz Records)
- 2013: Sparta Hits – LP (UIM Records – Guzu Musiq)
- 2013: Uncle Demon – LP (Guzu Musiq)
- 2013: Sparta Boss – LP (Guzu Musiq)
- 2017: Diamond Blessings – LP (Damage Musiq)
- 2018: New Creator – LP (Guzu Musiq)
- 2019: Reincarnation – LP (Boss Lady Muzic, Inc.)
- 2021: Transition – LP (Boss Lady Muzic, Inc.)
