= Bad Gyal =

Spanish singer and songwriter (born 1997)

- Bad Gyal in 2026

Background information
- Born: Alba Farelo i Solé; 7 March 1997 (age 29); Barcelona, Catalonia, Spain
- Genres: Dancehall; EDM; reggaeton; pop
- Occupations: Singer; songwriter; DJ; model
- Works: Discography
- Years active: 2016–present
- Labels: Aftercluv; Interscope
- Website: akabadgyal.com (in Spanish and English)

Alba Farelo i Solé (Catalan: [ˈalβə fəˈɾɛlu suˈle]; born 7 March 1997), known professionally as Bad Gyal, is a Spanish singer and songwriter. Bad Gyal has developed a strong cult following ever since her musical career began in 2016, with an interpretation of Rihanna's "Work" in the Catalan language. She continued to make music as an independent artist, releasing records like "Jacaranda" and "Fiebre". Bad Gyal later released two mixtapes: Slow Wine (2016) and Worldwide Angel (2018), which established her as an emerging artist within the Spanish urban scene.

Bad Gyal signed with Interscope Records and Aftercluv in 2019 and saw mainstream acclaim with songs like "Santa María", "Zorra" and "Alocao", the latter becoming a number-one song in Spain in 2019. 2021 saw the release of her first project as a signed artist Warm Up, and Sound System: The Final Releases. Her debut album, La joia, was released in 2024. Her second album Más Cara was released in 2026.

== Early life and education ==
Farelo was born on 7 March 1997 in Barcelona. The eldest of five children, Farelo is the daughter of Eduard Farelo, actor and voice actor. Farelo's younger sister Irma is also a singer, performing under the name Mushkaa.

At 18, Farelo entered the University of Barcelona, aiming to study fashion design. While attending university and simultaneously working at a call centre, she released "Pai", an adaptation of "Work", by Rihanna and Drake, in Catalan.

== Career ==
=== 2016–2018: Slow Wine Mixtape and Worldwide Angel ===
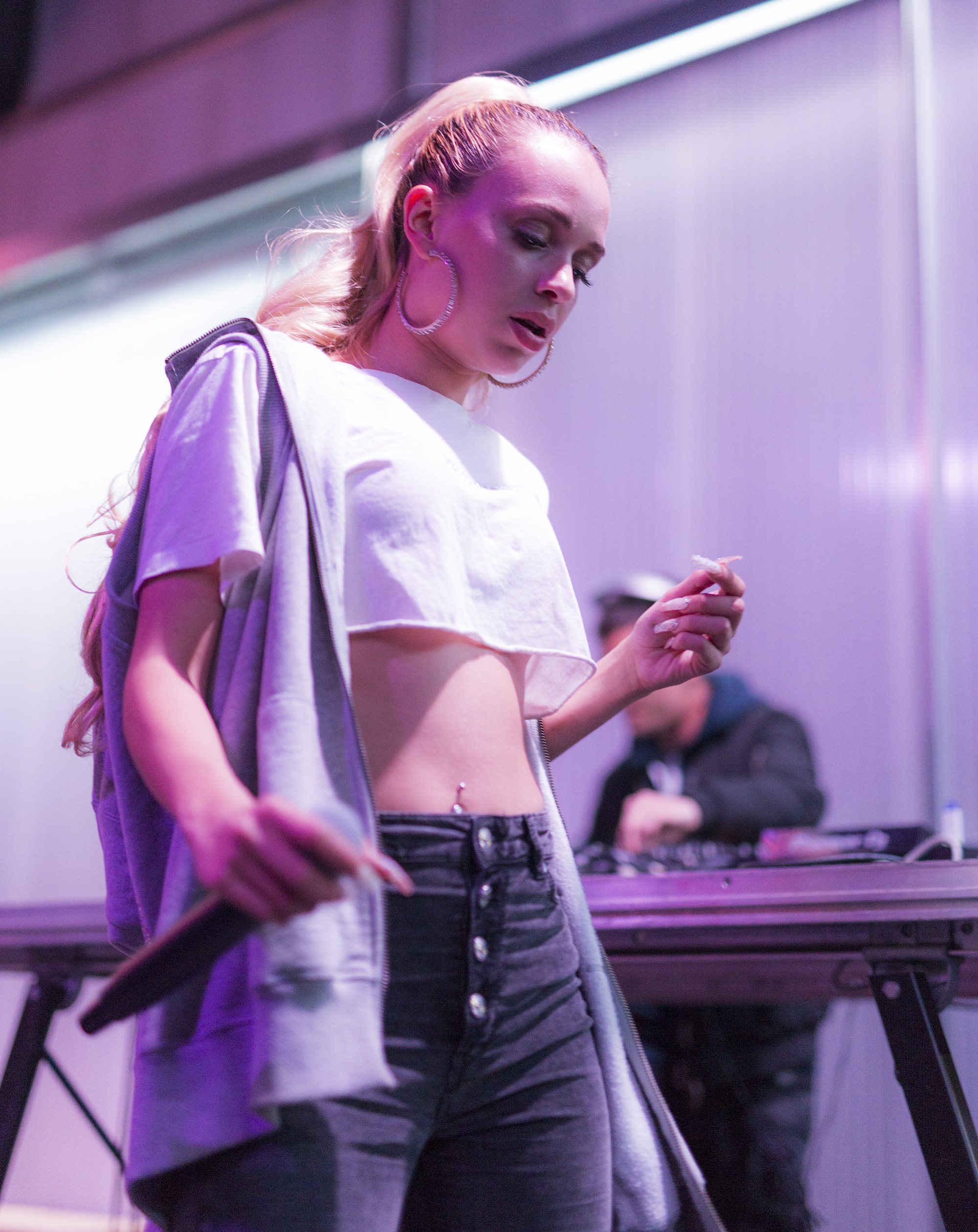
Bad Gyal performing in Barcelona, in 2018

After "Pai" gained popularity on YouTube, and was picked up by a local radio, Farelo started recording Slow Wine Mixtape, alongside producer Pablo Martínez. The mixtape was released on 9 November 2016 and caught the attention of several professional magazines and music outlets, including Pitchfork and Fact. The latter named her song "Jacaranda," the best single of 2017. After releasing the record's debut single "Fiebre", Bad Gyal's popularity grew exponentially. The song has developed a cult following ever since. The mixtape's success and critical acclaim led Farelo to perform at numerous festivals throughout Europe. In late 2017 she also toured Mexico and the United States.

In February 2018, she released her second mixtape, Worldwide Angel, to critical acclaim. The album was licensed and distributed by Canada Editorial. The mixtape was produced by Jam City, Dubbel Dutch, Florentino and El Guincho. It spawned many singles including "Blink", "Candela" and "Internationally". To promote the album, she took part in international festivals such as SXSW and Lollapalooza and toured the United States once again. In November 2018, she embarked on her first Asian tour, which visited Japan, China, and the Philippines. She also released "Open the Door" featuring Jamaican singer Govana, "Yo sigo iual" and "Unknown Feeling".

=== 2019–2021: Commercial breakthrough and Warm Up ===
Formerly signed with the production company Canada Editorial, in April 2019 it was announced Farelo had signed with Interscope Records and Aftercluv Dance Lab. As a signed artist, was able to enter the mainstream. Her first release was "Santa María", featuring Busy Signal, which became her first charting song in Spain, and was later certified gold. Its B-side, "Hookah", peaked at 55 in Spain. In October 2019, Farelo collaborated with Omar Montes on "Alocao", which peaked at number one in Spain for several weeks and is certified five times platinum. Two months later she released "Zorra", which peaked at number 2 in Spain. A remix featuring Rauw Alejandro was released in February 2021.

In 2020, Farelo was featured on Kafu Banton's "Tú eres un bom bom", which would later be remixed in collaboration with Guaynaa. She also released "Aprendiendo el Sexo" later on, with a music video produced by Canada and filmed at the W Hotel in Barcelona. In November, she released "Blin Blin" to commercial success and the acclaim of the general public. The track became viral in her home country and significantly used TikTok. She also partnered with Vodafone and offered a unique virtual concert.

Bad Gyal released her first extended play Warm Up on 19 March 2021. The EP peaked at 5 in Spain. She also collaborated with clothing brand Bershka and released an exclusive clothing line. On 25 June, she collaborated with Mariah Angeliq and María Becerra on "BOBO", which sampled TLC's "No Scrubs" and sparked controversy due to similarity with Luchy DR's "Bufón". As tour season came to an end, Farelo published "Flow 2000" as well as her second extended play Sound System: The Final Releases featuring songs she had been performing live for years yet remained unreleased. She released "A la mía" in parallel, exclusively for the Grand Theft Auto Online radio station Motomami Los Santos hosted by Rosalía and Arca.

=== 2022-2024: La Joia, La Joia Tour, and La Joia: Bad Gyal ===
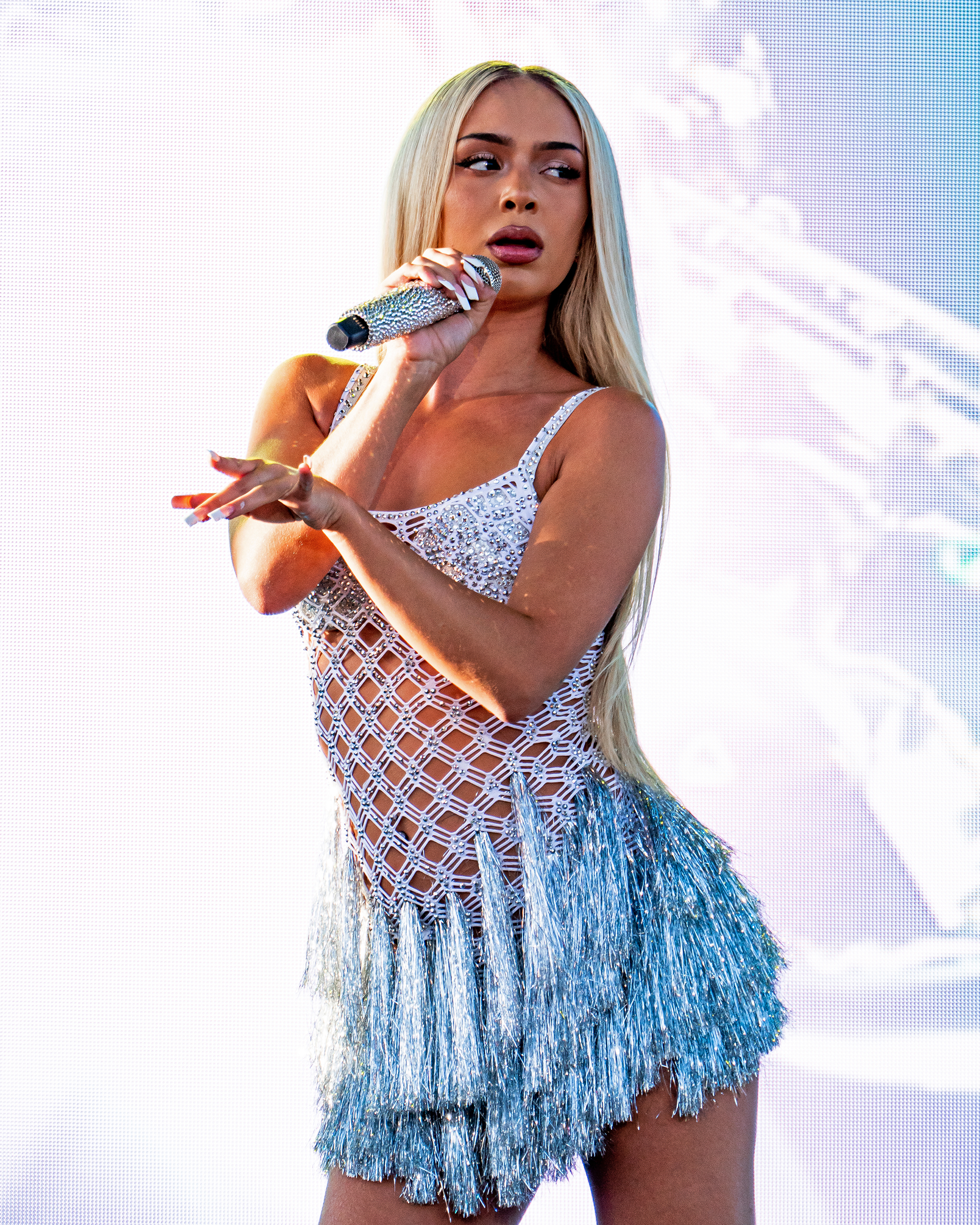
Bad Gyal at Primavera Sound 2022

At the beginning of 2022, Bad Gyal traveled to the United States to meet in the studio with producers such as Scott Storch, Supa Dups, and Nely el Arma Secreta, to record her first studio album. Additionally, she attended Paris Fashion Week. On 18 March, she released "Flow 2000 (Remix)" alongside singer Beny Jr, a release that she herself announced on social media on 15 March. A few days later, on 21 March, the rum brand Havana Club and Bad Gyal presented a new limited-edition bottle, which went on sale shortly thereafter. In April, one new collaboration were announced, "Formosa (Remix)", originally by Kaio Viana, featuring Totoy el Frío and MC CJ, which premiered on 6 May.

In May 2022, the Catalan artist announced her two biggest concerts yet, to be held in Madrid and Barcelona in February 2023. During the last week of May, she announced the release of the song "La prendo" on 26 May, produced by Leo RD and previewed during the first show of her new tour. The music video is the first part of a series of videos. The continuation was released on 17 June at midnight, led by the track "Tremendo culón", also previewed during her new tour shows, with a music video continuing the story from "La prendo". Continuing with the releases of songs previewed on La Joia Tour, the singer released the song "Sexy" at midnight on 15 July.

During the La Joia Tour show in New York, a surprise new song was performed, which was later released as "Sin Carné" at midnight on 6 October. On 28 November, Bad Gyal and Spanish artist Quevedo uploaded a video to TikTok dancing to the song "Real G". Two days later, she performed a snippet of the song during a concert in Mexico City. Finally, the song was officially released on 2 December.

The year 2023 began with the Catalan artist’s two largest concerts to date at the Palau Sant Jordi and WiZink Center. She also announced that her debut album would be released that same year. One day before the Barcelona concert, on 10 February, she premiered her song "Chulo", which had been previewed during La Joia Tour and on TikTok, where she had over ten thousand videos related to it before the official release. On 11 February, during her first concert at Palau Sant Jordi, she confirmed the album would be titled La Joia. On 24 February 2023, Karol G released her album Mañana será bonito, which includes the song "KÁRMIKA" a collaboration between the Colombian artist, Bad Gyal, and Jamaican Sean Paul.

On 20 April 2023, Bad Gyal performed "Chulo" live at the Latin American Music Awards in Las Vegas, marking her first invitation to perform at a major international music awards show. The following day, Spanish singer Amaia released her own version of the song "Fiebre", which she had been performing in concerts for some time. On 18 May, a remix of the song "Qué rico" by Un Titico and El Dany MG was released, featuring Bad Gyal.

On 7 June, Bad Gyal became the face of the annual summer advertising campaign Mediterráneamente by the renowned beer brand Estrella Damm. As part of this collaboration, the short film titled PKM (“Pussy K Mana”) and the song “El Sol Me Da” were released. Later, on 22 June, Bad Gyal released the remix "Chulo pt.2", a collaboration with Dominican artist Tokischa and Puerto Rican Young Miko. This song remained on the music charts of several Latin American countries, on the Hot Latin Songs chart and the Billboard Global 200 for several weeks. It was also certified six-times platinum in the United States by the Recording Industry Association of America and gold in Mexico by AMPROFON. Two weeks after this release, on 7 July, Bad Gyal launched her new song "Mi lova" alongside Myke Towers.

In September, the singer was awarded the International Young Talent award by the Spanish newspaper La Vanguardia. The ceremony took place at the Museu Nacional d'Art de Catalunya, with King Felipe VI, Queen Letizia, and the acting First Vice President of the Government, Nadia Calviño, presenting the award.

On 2 October, producer Ovy On The Drums posted an Instagram reel announcing that his next song would feature Bad Gyal and Colombian singer Ryan Castro, accompanied by a preview of the lyrics during the studio composition. "Ghetto Princess" was released on 5 October. Additionally, on 4 October, Chilean singer Polimá Westcoast announced the tracklist of his EP De Camino a Hermes, which includes the song "BARCELONA", a collaboration with Bad Gyal and Chilean artist Standly. The EP and the song were released on 9 November.

Later, singer Nicki Nicole announced via her Instagram channel the collaboration "Enamórate" with Bad Gyal. The track had been previewed in shows by both artists throughout 2023. The song was finally released on 14 November. On 23 November, the Catalan artist revealed the first official teaser of her debut album, La Joia, via an Instagram reel, announcing a January release the following year. Along with this, she published the upcoming Spanish dates for La Joia: 24 Karats Tour, which will visit Spanish indoor stadiums such as Palau Sant Jordi and WiZink Center. Later, during an interview on 6 December with Los 40, Bad Gyal announced that her song "Give Me", previously previewed during shows, would be released the following week as another advance from the album. To close the year, on 13 December, she revealed the album’s tracklist via Instagram. It will include 15 songs, among them previously released projects, show previews, and other unreleased tracks.

At the beginning of 2024, Bad Gyal revealed the release of a collaboration, and the final preview of her upcoming album, with Brazilian singer Anitta. The song, titled "Bota Niña", was released on 12 January.

Finally, after much anticipation and speculation surrounding the project, her debut album La Joia was released on 26 January 2024, across digital platforms. On the same day, the music video for the song "Perdió este culo" premiered, starring actor Martiño Rivas. Additionally, the official album merchandise was announced for sale on the singer’s website, along with LP, CD, and limited edition CD formats of the record.

On 22 February Bad Gyal performed "Bota Niña", together with Anitta, at the Premios Lo Nuestro, held at the Kaseya Center in Miami. Both artists took advantage of the trip to shoot the music video for the song, which was released on 14 March. Shortly after, on 22 March, "Double team", a single by Anitta featuring Puerto Rican artist Brray and Bad Gyal, was released as part of Anitta’s album Funk Generation.

On 28 March, Mushkaa and Bad Gyal released "SexeSexy", marking Bad Gyal’s first song in Catalan since the 2018 release of "Yo sigo igual", previously unreleased from her sister’s album. Her next collaboration came out on 18 April, "Guay" with Puerto Rican singer Ozuna. The song stayed for weeks on the Spanish weekly charts, reaching number 8 on PROMUSICAE’s Top 100 Canciones list. It also earned a platinum certification.

On 24 May, Bad Gyal released the remix of "Perdió este culo" alongside Puerto Rican artist Ivy Queen, titled "Perdió". Then, on 5 July, "Party Amanecio" was released, featuring Bad Gyal alongside Ryan Castro, De La Ghetto, Maldy (from the duo Plan B), and producers DJ Luian and Mambo Kingz, under the Hear This Music label.

On 9 July, Amazon Prime Video released the teaser for La Joia: Bad Gyal, a documentary about the making of the album La Joia, announcing its release for later in the year. One month later, Colombian artist J Balvin released his album Rayo, which includes a song featuring Bad Gyal titled "Gato".

On 12 September, "Duro De Verdad pt. 2", Bad Gyal’s first bachata, was released. It is a remix of the original song by Los Sufridos, a group of Dominican producers and artists. The track reached number 2 on PROMUSICAE’s charts in Spain, the highest position Alba has achieved on this list since the release of "Zorra" in 2019.

On 23 October, the documentary La Joia: Bad Gyal premiered at the In-Edit festival in Barcelona, and the following day it was released in cinemas across Spain and Andorra.

The singer received five nominations at the LOS40 Music Awards, where she won Mejor Colaboración Latina Urbana for "Mi Lova" with Myke Towers, and Mejor Artista Español Urbano. She also performed at the awards ceremony, presenting a medley of her songs including "Fiebre", "Flow 2000", "Chulo", "Perdió Este Culo", "La Que No Se Mueva", and "Duro de verdad pt.2".

=== 2025-present: New singles, Bikini Badness Tour and Más Cara ===
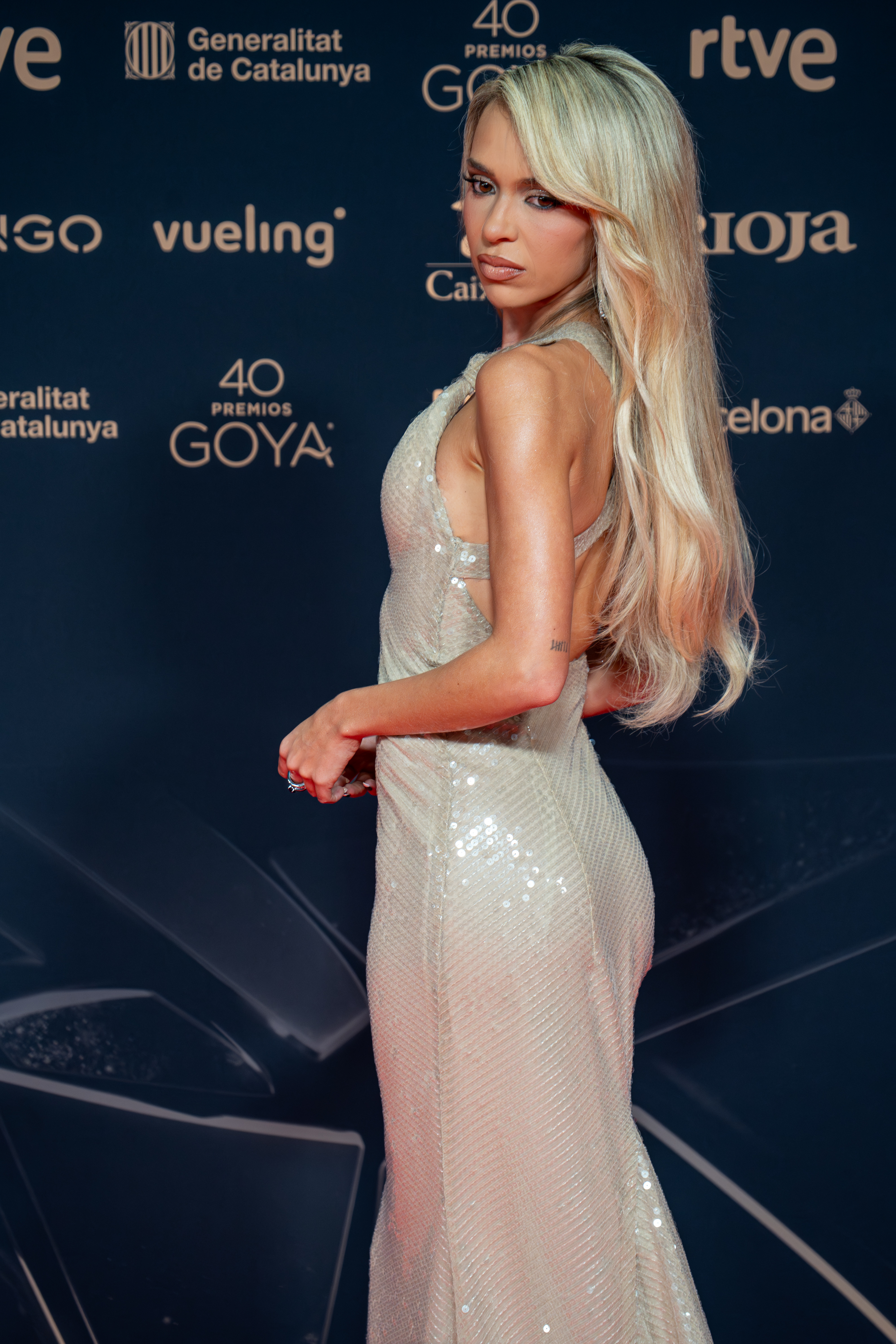
Bad Gyal at the 2026 Goya Awards

On 17 January she released her first single of the year, "Angelito", in collaboration with Argentine rapper Trueno. A month later, in February 2025, it was revealed that the Catalan artist had recorded a new track with singer Nicky Jam and American producer Scott Storch, generating high expectations among her fans.

On 20 February she attended the 37th edition of Premios Lo Nuestro, where she had received five nominations, including Album of the Year for La Joia. That night, she took home her first Premio Lo Nuestro in the category of Best Eurosong for "Chulo pt.2", alongside Tokischa and Young Miko. Continuing her streak of releases, on 18 April she dropped "Comernos", a collaboration with Puerto Rican artist Omar Courtz.

On 27 May she announced her upcoming festival tour, Bikini Badness Tour. The first show took place on 2 June at the well-known Pachá nightclub in Ibiza, where she also premiered "Da Me", her first solo single in over a year. The track was officially released on 6 June, and quickly climbed to number 7 on the PROMUSICAE Top 100 chart. During an Instagram Live session where she discussed the new single, she reflected on her artistic direction, stating: "You have to follow your own instincts", referring to her embrace of autotune in this new era.

On 13 June, during her performance at the O Son do Camiño festival, she surprised the audience with the live debut of an unreleased collaboration with Zion & Lennox. A few weeks later, on 18 July, she released "Última noche" with Ozuna, produced by Jorge Miliano and Cromo X. Staying true to the Caribbean sounds that have characterized her recent work, the song debuted at number 23 on the PROMUSICAE chart.

== Discography ==
- La joia (2024)
- Más cara (2026)

== Filmography ==
=== Television ===
Year	Title	Role	Ref.
2019	La hora musa	Performer	
2020	Gaudir	Co-protagonist	
2021	Maestros de la costura	Guest appearance	
2021	Drag Race España	Guest judge	
2024	La joia: Bad Gyal	Herself	

== Tours ==
=== Headlining ===
- Slow Wine Mixtape Tour (2017)
- 2018 WORLD TOUR (2018)
- BadGyal SoundSystem (2019–2021)
- Tour Bad Gyal 2022 (2022)
- La Joia Tour (2023–2024)
- Bikini Badness Tour (2025)
- Más Cara World Tour (2026)

=== Supporting ===
- Mañana Será Bonito Tour (2023)

== Awards and nominations ==
List of awards and nominations received by Bad Gyal
Award	Year	Recipient	Category	Result	Ref.
Baazar Women of the Year	2025	Herself	Trailblazer	Won	
Berlin Music Video Awards	2026	"Da Me"	Best Editor	Nominated	
Grammy Awards	2024	Funk Generation (as songwriter and featured artist)	Best Latin Pop Album	Nominated	
GQ Men of the Year	2024	Herself	Women of the Year	Won	
Heat Latin Music Awards	2024	Herself	Best New Artist	Nominated	
iHeartRadio Music Awards	2024	Herself	Best Latin New Artist	Nominated	
Los 40 Music Awards	2022	Herself	Best Urban Act	Nominated	
Los 40 Music Awards	2023	Herself	Best Spanish Urban Act	Nominated	
Los 40 Music Awards	2024	Herself	Best Spanish Urban Act	Won	
Los 40 Music Awards	2024	La Joia 24 Karats Tour	Best Spanish Tour or Concert	Nominated	
Los 40 Music Awards	2024	"Perdió este culo"	Best Spanish Video	Nominated	
Los 40 Music Awards	2024	"Guay" (with Ozuna)	Best Latin Video	Nominated	
Los 40 Music Awards	2024	"Mi Lova" (with Myke Towers)	Best Urban Collaboration	Won	
Los 40 Music Awards	2025	"Comernos" (with Omar Courtz)	Best Urban Collaboration	Nominated	
Los 40 Music Awards	2025	"Da Me"	Best Video	Nominated	
Los 40 Music Awards	2025	Herself	Best Spanish Urban Act	Nominated	
ARC Awards	2021	Herself	Best Self-Titled Artist Tour	Won	
Latin American Music Awards	2024	Herself	New Artist of the Year	Nominated	
Latin Grammy Awards	2023	Mañana Será Bonito (as songwriter and featured artist)	Album of the Year	Won	
Latin Grammy Awards	2026	"Choque"	Best Reggaeton Performance	Pending	
Latin Grammy Awards	2026	Más cara	Best Urban Music Album	Pending	
Latin Music Italian Awards	2020	"Alocao" (with Omar Montes)	Best Eurolatino Song	Won	
MTV Europe Music Awards	2022	Herself	Best Spanish Act	Won	
MTV Millennial Awards	2024	Herself	Celebrity Crush	Nominated	
MTV Millennial Awards	2024	Herself	Crack Artist	Nominated	
MTV Millennial Awards	2024	"Bota Niña" (with Anitta)	Bellakeo Supremo	Nominated	
Premios +Música	2025	La Joia	Best Urban Recording	Won	
Premios Juventud	2022	Herself	New Female Artist	Nominated	
Premios Juventud	2023	Herself	Female Artist – On The Rise	Nominated	
Premios Juventud	2025	"Chulo pt.2" (with Tokischa and Young Miko)	Girl Power	Nominated	
Premios Juventud	2025	"2AM" (with Sebastián Yatra)	Best Pop/Urban Son	Nominated	
Premios Juventud	2025	"Comernos" (with Omar Courtz)	Best Urban Mix	Nominated	
Premios Lo Nuestro	2023	Herself	Breakthrough Female Artist	Nominated	
Premios Lo Nuestro	2025	Herself	Urban Artist of the Year - Female	Nominated	
Premios Lo Nuestro	2025	"Chulo pt.2" (with Tokischa and Young Miko)	Best ‘EuroSong’ - Urban Pop	Won	
Premios Lo Nuestro	2025	"Chulo pt.2" (with Tokischa and Young Miko)	Song of the Year	Nominated	
Premios Lo Nuestro	2025	"Chulo pt.2" (with Tokischa and Young Miko)	Best Female Collaboration	Nominated	
Premios Lo Nuestro	2025	La Joia	Album of the Year	Nominated	
Premios Odeón	2021	"Alocao" (with Omar Montes)	Best Urban Song	Nominated	
Premios Odeón	2021	Herself	Breakthrough Urban Artist	Nominated	
Premios Odeón	2022	Herself	Urban Artist	Nominated	
Premios Odeón	2022	Warm Up	Album of the Year	Nominated	
Premios Odeón	2022	Warm Up	Best Urban Album	Nominated	
Premios Odeón	2022	"44" (with Rema)	Best Urban Song	Nominated	
Premios Tu Música Urbano	2022	Herself	Top New Artist – Female	Nominated	
Premios Tu Música Urbano	2023	Herself	Top Rising Star — Female	Nominated	
Premios Tu Música Urbano	2025	Herself	Top Rising Star — Female	Nominated	
Premios Tu Música Urbano	2025	"2AM" (with Sebastián Yatra)	Pop Song	Nominated	
Rolling Stone en Español Awards	2023	Herself	Voice of the Audience	Nominated	
Premios Vanguardia	2023	Herself	Premio Talento Joven Internacional (Young Talent Award)	Won	
