= Tokischa =

Dominican rapper (born 1996)

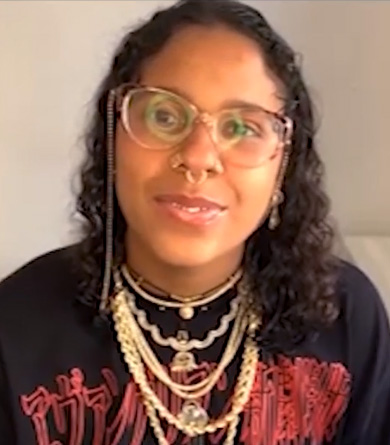
- Tokischa in 2021

Background information
- Born: Tokischa Altagracia Peralta Juárez; 17 March 1996 (age 30); Santo Domingo, Dominican Republic
- Genres: Dominican dembow; urbano; reggaeton; Latin trap
- Occupations: Rapper; songwriter
- Years active: 2018–present
- Labels: Paulus; Sony Latin; Warner Latina

Tokischa Altagracia Peralta Juárez (born 17 March 1996), known mononymously as Tokischa, is a Dominican rapper. After working for photographer Raymi Paulus, she was offered to enter the music industry. She signed a recording contract with Paulus Music and released her debut single "Pícala". After her song "Linda" alongside Rosalía was released with great commercial success, she continued collaborating with artists such as J Balvin, Madonna, Anuel AA and Ozuna. Her lyrics mostly refer to sexual activity. Tokischa has often been catalogued as "controversial" by media outlets, with her music sparking controversy and receiving notable media coverage.

== Early life ==
Tokischa was groomed into sex work at 18, about which she commented during an interview: "being with a person you aren't attracted to and like is frustrating. After I had sex with someone, I would go into the bathroom to take a shower, crying, frustrated". At first she would spend the money on drugs, then on music.

Tokischa identifies as bisexual.

== Career ==
In January 2021, Tokischa published the single "Yo No Me Voy Acostar", alongside Yailin La Más Viral and La Perversa. That same month she premiered "Bellaca Putona", with Químico Ultra Mega, which managed to position itself at the top of the charts in her home country. During the year, she continued to release songs in the urbano umbrella genre and collaborations with regional artist. Tokischa made international headlines in the summer of that year after several collaborations with Latin artists J Balvin and Rosalía. Both music videos were filmed in Santo Domingo. Both Tokischa and Rosalía largely teased their song "Linda", which was produced by Leo RD. It was released on 1 September. They collaborated again the following year on "La Combi Versace", from the latter's album Motomami. A week before, "Perra", the Balvin collaboration, was released for digital download. Tokischa, together with her record label Paulus Music, had previously signed a distribution deal with Equity Distribution, Roc Nation's indie distribution company earlier that season.

In September 2022, Tokischa was featured on "Hung Up on Tokischa", a remix of Madonna's 2005 hit single "Hung Up"; the song uses dembow.

== Artistry ==
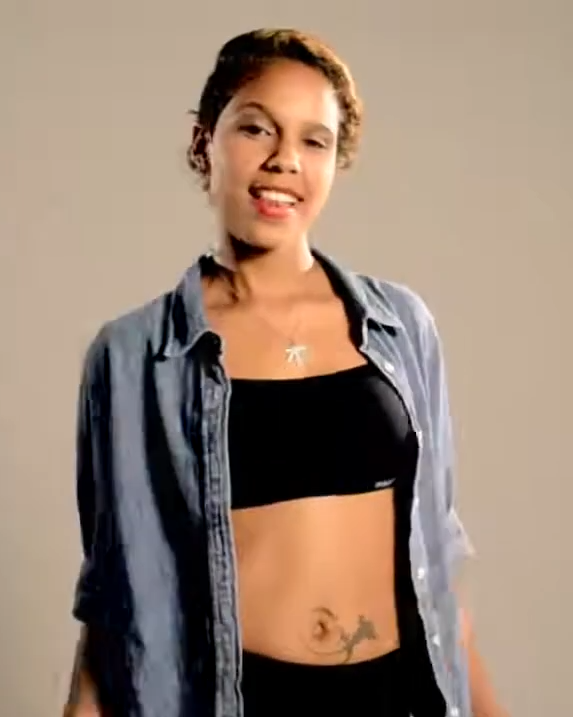
Tokischa in 2015

Tokischa cultivates various musical styles, where trap, hip hop, rap and urbano stand out. However, she has stated in different occasions that there is no genre that identifies her. Her songs have quite personal and "the most honest possible" lyrics. One artist who inspired her early in her career was DJ Scuff. Tokischa is also a fan of rock music. She has stated that: "I chose to trap because it is the closest thing there is now to rock, which has always been my favorite genre. Trap is modern rock. At that time I was very unleashed, and I expressed myself that way".

== Controversies ==
In December 2019, Tokischa signed up on OnlyFans and started to post sexually-explicit content after having previously been censored on Instagram. In 2021, the singer said that "I opened my account because I have always liked explicit content, sexuality, sexiness and horniness. That had always caused trouble to me as a child since my family saw me taking hot pictures. Instagram deleted a couple photos of me some years ago so, when OnlyFans became a thing, I saw the opportunity to do it with no censorship nor explanation. I also met a team of professionals who taught me how to make an economic profit out of it. That helped me quite a lot during the pandemic. All investment I did in my music in the last months has come from this platform".

In October 2020 she released the track "Desacato Escolar", a collaboration with Yomel El Meloso and Leo RD, on streaming platforms. The track caused controversy for its lyrics referencing prostitution. It was taken down from YouTube. Tokischa talked about it to RTVE, stating that: "I think that those people who criticize him do not want to accept life as it is. Dembow and urban music in general are the expression of the neighborhood and the underworld, of what is lived. If the rap tells you about crime and weapons, it is because that exists, not because the artist is inventing it. We cannot ignore those realities. Prostitution is the same, it has always existed, and if they talk about it in songs, it is because it is like that. If that person who criticizes feels very neat, then perhaps it is because he does not want to know about these realities or that all that comes to light, but we sing about what we live, and that is inevitable".

In August 2021, the rapper posed semi-naked at the sanctuary of the Virgin of Altagracia in La Vega. The town's mayor, released a statement in which he condemned that Tokischa "failed to the ethical norms and values that that govern the civilized and exemplary coexistence of our municipality". The rapper later expressed her regrets online and stated that "I didn't do it with the intention of offending, if not more to show that anyone can pray, come from wherever, or whatever it represents". Despite the apology, the La Vega Prosecutor's Office ruled that the performer will not be able to visit the sanctuaries of that province for a year, after Mayor Kelvin Cruz filed a complaint against her.

== Discography ==
=== Singles ===
==== As lead artist ====
Title	Year	Peak chart positions				Certifications	Album
Title	Year	DR	SPA	US Latin	WW	Certifications	Album
"Pícala" (with Tivi Gunz)	2018	—	—	—	*		Non-album singles
"Qué Viva" (with Químico Ultra Mega)	2018	—	—	—	*		Non-album singles
"Perras Como Tú" (with Farina)	2018	—	—	—	*		Miss Bala
"Empatillada" (with Jamby El Favo)	2019	—	—	—	*		Non-album singles
"Twerk" (with Eladio Carrión)	2019	—	—	—	*		Non-album singles
"Amor & Dinero" (with El Jincho)	2020	—	—	—	*		Non-album singles
"Varón"	2020	—	—	—	*		Non-album singles
"Me Lo Como" (with Luiyitox, Black Jonas Point, Quimico Ultra Mega and El Experimento)	2020	—	—	—	—		Non-album singles
"Desacato Escolar" (with Yomel El Meloso and Leo RD)	2020	—	—	—	—		Non-album singles
"Hoy Amanecí" (with Tivi Gunz)	2020	—	—	—	—		Non-album singles
"El Rey de la Popola" (with Rocky RD)	2020	—	—	—	—		Non-album singles
"Yo No Me Voy Acostar" (with Yailin La Más Viral and La Perversa)	2021	—	—	—	—		Non-album singles
"Bellaca Putona" (with Quimico Ultra Mega)	2021	—	—	—	—		Non-album singles
"Siete" (with DJ Scuff and Jaleoo)	2021	—	—	—	—		Non-album singles
"No Me Importa" (with Secreto El Famoso Biberon)	2021	—	—	—	—		Non-album singles
"Tukuntazo" (with El Cherry Scom and Haraca Kiko)	2021	—	—	—	—		Non-album singles
"Mala" (with Nino Freestyle)	2021	—	—	—	—		Non-album singles
"Perra" (with J Balvin)	2021	—	—	48	—		Jose
"Yo Lo Daño" (with El Cherry Scom and Leo RD)	2021	—	—	—	—		Non-album singles
"Linda" (with Rosalía)	2021	8	22	34	– (Note: "Linda" did not enter the Billboard Global 200 but peaked at number 169 on the Billboard Global Excl. US chart.)	AMPROFON: Gold; PROMUSICAE: Gold; RIAA: 2× Platinum (Latin)	Non-album singles
"Dorito & Coca-Cola" (with Danny Ocean)	2021	—	—	—	—		@dannocean
"Singamo" (with Yomel El Meloso, Paulus Music and Leo RD)	2021	—	—	—	—		Non-album singles
"Estilazo" (with Marshmello)	2022	—	—	—	—		Non-album singles
"Hola" (with Eladio Carrión)	2022	—	—	—	—		Non-album singles
"Somos Iguales" (with Ozuna)	2022	—	—	45	—		Non-album singles
"Delincuente" (with Anuel AA and Ñengo Flow)	2022	—	—	27	—	AMPROFON: Platinum; RIAA: 4× Platinum (Latin)	Non-album singles
"Hung Up on Tokischa" (with Madonna)	2022	—	—	— (Note: "Hung Up on Tokischa" did not enter the Hot Latin Songs but peaked at number 8 on the Latin Digital Song Sales chart.)	—		Non-album singles
"Kilos de Amor" (with Natanael Cano)	2022	—	—	—	—		Non-album singles
"Candy"	2023	—	—	—	—		TBA
"La Muerte" (with Luísa Sonza)	2023	—	—	—	—		Escândalo Íntimo
"Daddy" (featuring Sexyy Red)	2023	—	—	—	—		TBA
"Sol"	2024	—	—	—	—		TBA
"Chama" (with Arca)	2024	—	—	—	—		TBA
"De Maravisha" (with Nathy Peluso)	2024	—	—	—	—		TBA
"—" denotes a title that was not released or did not chart in that territory. "*" indicates a chart that did not exist at the time.

==== As featured artist ====
List of singles as featured artist, showing year released, chart positions, and originating album
Title	Year	Peaks						Certifications	Album
Title	Year	ARG	CHI	ECU	PER	SPA	WW	Certifications	Album
"Players (Tokischa remix)" (Coi Leray featuring Tokischa)	2023	—	—	—	—	—	—		Non-album single
"Chulo Pt. 2" (Bad Gyal featuring Tokischa and Young Miko)	2023	18	7	14	11	— (Note: Sales for the remix were included into the ones for the original version and not listed independently. "Chulo" entered at number 19 following the release of the remix (it had previously peaked at number 16) and was certified platinum.)	91	AMPROFON: Gold; RIAA: 6× Platinum (Latin)	La joia
"Ride or Die Pt. 2" (Sevdaliza featuring Villano Antillano and Tokischa)	2024	—	—	—	—	65	112	PROMUSICAE: Gold	Non-album single
"Flackito Jodye" (ASAP Rocky featuring Tokischa)	2026	—	—	—	—	—	—		Don't Be Dumb
"—" denotes a title that was not released or did not chart in that territory.

==== Other charted and certified songs ====
Title	Year	Peak chart positions		Certifications	Album
Title	Year	POR	SPA	Certifications	Album
"La Combi Versace" (Rosalía featuring Tokischa)	2022	189	12	PROMUSICAE: Platinum	Motomami

== Awards and nominations ==
Award	Year	Category	Nominated work	Result	Ref.
iHeartRadio Music Awards	2022	Best New Latin Artist	Tokischa	Nominated	
Latin Grammy Awards	2022	Album of the Year	Motomami (as songwriter)	Won	
Latin Grammy Awards	2025	Best Urban/Urban Fusion Performance	"De Maravisha" (with Nathy Peluso)	Nominated	
MTV Millennial Awards	2024	Viral Anthem	"Ride or Die, PT. 2" (with Sevdaliza & Villano Antillano)	Nominated	
Premios Juventud	2022	The New Generation – Female	Tokischa	Nominated	
Premios Juventud	2022	Best Girl Power Collab	"Linda" (with Rosalía)	Nominated	
Premios Juventud	2022	Best Social Dance Challenge	"Linda" (with Rosalía)	Nominated	
Premios Juventud	2023	Female Artist – On The Rise	Tokischa	Nominated	
Premios Juventud	2023	Girl Power	"Hung Up on Tokischa" (with Madonna)	Nominated	
Premios Juventud	2023	Best Dembow Collaboration	"Delincuente" (with Anuel AA & Ñengo Flow)	Won	
Premio Lo Nuestro	2023	New Artist – Female	Tokischa	Nominated	
Premio Lo Nuestro	2023	Female Urban Artist of the Year	Tokischa	Nominated	
Premio Lo Nuestro	2024	Crossover Collaboration of the Year	"Somos Iguales" (with Ozuna & Louchie Lou & Michie One)	Nominated	
Premios Tu Música Urbano	2022	Top Artist — Dembow	Tokischa	Nominated	
Premios Tu Música Urbano	2022	Top Song — Dembow	"Linda" (with Rosalía)	Nominated	
Premios Tu Música Urbano	2023	Top New Artist — Female	Tokischa	Nominated	
Premios Tu Música Urbano	2023	Top Artist – Dembow	Tokischa	Nominated	
Premios Tu Música Urbano	2023	Top Song — Dembow	"Delincuente" (with Anuel AA and Ñengo Flow)	Nominated	
