= Perdió este culo =

2024 single by Bad Gyal

"Perdió Este Culo"

Single by Bad Gyal

from the album La Joia
- Language: Spanish
- Released: 26 January 2024
- Genre: Reggaeton; Dancehall
- Length: 2:39
- Label: Universal Music Latino; Interscope
- Songwriters: Alba Solé; Marco Barrero
- Producer: MAG

Bad Gyal singles chronology
"Bota Niña" (2024)	"Perdió Este Culo" (2024)	"Double Team" (2024)

"Perdió Este Culo" (Spanish for "He Lost This Ass") is a song recorded by Spanish singer-songwriter Bad Gyal. It was released, along with the album, on 26 January 2024 as the eighth and final single from Bad Gyal's debut studio album, La joia (2024), through Universal Music Latino and Interscope Records. Lyrically, the song reminds an ex-lover "what he's missing out on." A music video directed by Félix Bollaín and starring Spanish actor Martiño Rivas was released for the song. The song peaked at number 15 in Spain.

On 24 May 2024, a remixed version of the single titled "Perdió" (English: "He Lost") featuring Puerto Rican rapper Ivy Queen was released with an accompanying music video. The remix features different harmonies, ad-libs and additional bars from Ivy Queen, in-place of the original track's final bars.

== Release and promotion ==
The song was first performed on May 22, 2022, in Viladecans, Barcelona, alongside tracks such as "Sexy", "Chulo", "Tremendo Culón" and "La Prendo". It quickly gained widespread popularity and public approval, as recordings of the performance were soon uploaded to social media platforms like SoundCloud and TikTok, where users began enthusiastically promoting and generating hype around the track.

At concerts, audiences were already chanting "Perdió Este Culo" before the song was officially released on streaming platforms. This organic anticipation significantly contributed to the track’s viral momentum and cultural traction.

"Perdió Este Culo" was released along with the album on 26 January 2024. Bad Gyal performed the song in a medley, along with "Fiebre," "Chulo," "La que no se mueva," "Flow 2000," and "Duro de verdad pt.2" at the 2024 Los 40 Music Awards. The official music video was released on Bad Gyal's official YouTube channel on 26 January 2024. It was directed by Félix Bollaín, starring Spanish actor Martiño Rivas. In the video, Rivas and Bad Gyal "play a couple who have just broken up." It has attained over 18 million views as of December 2024.

== Reception ==
Billboard, in their weekly round-up of the best new Latin music releases, said the song was "more fun and less racy than its title." Constanza Rodriguez for Chilean newspaper, La Rata named the song as one of the highlights of the album, comparing it to the earlier singles in her discography. At the 2024 Los 40 Music Awards, it was nominated for Best Spanish Video.

== Remix ==
"Perdió"

Single by Bad Gyal and Ivy Queen
- Language: Spanish
- Released: 24 May 2024
- Genre: Reggaeton; dancehall
- Length: 2:40
- Label: Universal Music Latino; Interscope
- Songwriters: Alba Solé; Marco Barrero; Martha Pesante
- Producer: Mag

Bad Gyal singles chronology
"Guay" (2024)	"Perdió" (2024)	"Party amanecio" (2024)

Ivy Queen singles chronology
"Primer aviso" (2024)	"Perdió" (2024)	"De luto" (2024)

=== Background ===
Bad Gyal credits Ivy Queen as one of her primary influences, revealing to have listened to her music since she was a young girl. In December 2023, Bad Gyal and Queen met for the first time backstage at Rauw Alejandro’s Club Saturno concert in San Juan, Puerto Rico. In March 2024, the pair celebrated their birthdays together in Miami.

=== Promotion and release ===
On 19 May 2024, Bad Gyal teased a collaboration with an unannounced artist via her Instagram account, stating La joia "is not done. I still have to release a song with an artist who I admire a lot." Inviting fans to check her TikTok account, Bad Gyal revealed the artist to be Ivy Queen. Bad Gyal revealed to Rolling Stone that Queen was the only person to make the song bigger, calling the collaboration process with Queen to be "incredible". Queen revealed to Spanish digital media company mitú that the collaboration brought a "moment of reflection". She went on to say while recording the music video for the song, she viewed Bad Gyal as her daughter. In an interview with Spanish newspaper El País, Bad Gyal admitted that recording the song was one of the "most intense experiences of her life." "Perdio" was released on 24 May 2024.

=== Music video ===
The official music video was released on May 23, 2024 in the United States and May 24, 2024 in Spain through Bad Gyal's official YouTube channel. The video was directed by Stillz and produced by We Own The City. Lucas Villa, for Remezcla said the pair "shined like diamond-studded goddesses in the 2000s-coded video." It has attained over 6.5 million views as of September 2026.

=== Reception ===
Writing for ¡Hola!, an editor selected the remix as the second best new release of the week, behind Rauw Alejandro's "Touching the Sky". Villa, for Remezcla claimed Queen to rule the track with an "iron fist", adding "her fierce flow" to the "break-up anthem". Chilean newspaper La Hora, called the song "remix of the summer."

== Charts ==
=== Weekly charts ===
Weekly chart performance for "Perdio este culo"
Chart (2024)	Peak position
Spain (PROMUSICAE)	15

== Certifications ==
Certifications for "Perdio este culo"
Region	Certification	Certified units/sales
Spain (Promusicae)	Platinum	60,000^{‡}
^{‡} Sales+streaming figures based on certification alone.
