= Warm Up (EP) =

EP by Bad Gyal
- Released: 19 March 2021
- Recorded: c. 2019–2021
- Studios: Angel Sound (Barcelona); Miami
- Length: 20:38
- Language: Spanish
- Labels: Aftercluv; Interscope
- Producers: El Guincho; Fakeguido; Izzy Beats; Jasper Harris; Nely el Arma Secreta; Rawsanches; Scott Storch; Sickdrumz; Star Boy; Supa Dups

Bad Gyal chronology
Worldwide Angel (2018)	Warm Up (2021)	Sound System: The Final Releases (2021)

Singles from Warm Up
- 1. "Aprendiendo el sexo" Released: 31 July 2020; 2. "Blin Blin" Released: 13 November 2020; 3. "Zorra (remix)" Released: 21 January 2021; 4. "Judas" Released: 18 March 2021; 5. "Pussy" Released: 24 March 2021; 6. "44" Released: 10 June 2021

Warm Up is the debut extended play (EP) by Spanish singer-songwriter Bad Gyal. It was released on 19 March 2021 by Aftercluv Dance Lab and Interscope Records, and it is her first full-length release after being signed with these two labels in 2019.

== Critical reception ==
Professional ratings
Review scores
Source	Rating
Mondo Sonoro	7/10

In a review for Mondo Sonoro, Luis M. Maínez highlighted the quality of the production and the beats of all the tracks, yet stated that "Bad Gyal does not stop improving without innovating too much", and noted that "the vocal collaborations are less interesting than the musical ones."

Year-end lists rankings for Warm Up
Publication	Accolade	Rank	Ref.
Mondo Sonoro	The Best Spanish Albums of 2021	48	
Rockdelux	National EPs of 2021	3	

List of awards and nominations received by Warm Up
Ceremony	Year	Recipient	Category	Result	Ref.
Odeón Awards	2022	Warm Up	Album of the Year	Nominated	
Odeón Awards	2022	Warm Up	Best Urban Album	Nominated	

== Commercial performance ==
Warm Up peaked at number five on the Spanish Albums chart. All eight tracks charted on the Spanish Songs list.

== Track listing ==
Warm Up track listing
No.	Title	Writer(s)	Producer(s)	Length
1.	"Pussy" (featuring el Guincho)	Alba Farelo; Pablo Díaz-Reixa; Pablo Martínez; Pau Riutort	El Guincho	2:17
2.	"44" (featuring Rema)	Farelo; Andron Francois Cross; Claudell M. Mosanto; Divine Ikubor; Dwayne Chin-Quee; Díaz-Reixa; Thomas Broussard	Izzy Beats; Supa Dups	3:05
3.	"Blin Blin" (transl. "Bling-bling") (featuring Juanka)	Farelo; Anton Martin Mendo; Jasper Lee Harris; Juan K. Bauza Blasini; Díaz-Reixa	El Guincho; Jasper Harris; Star Boy	2:24
4.	"Judas" (featuring Khea)	Nely el Arma Secreta; Farelo; Ivo Alfredo Thomas Serue; Díaz-Reixa; Martínez; Riutort	Nely el Arma Secreta; el Guincho; Fakeguido; Rawsanches	2:25
5.	"Iconic"	Farelo; Díaz-Reixa; Martínez; Riutort	El Guincho; Fakeguido; Rawsanches	2:14
6.	"Gasto" (transl. "I spend")	Farelo; Díaz-Reixa; Martínez; Riutort	El Guincho; Fakeguido	2:08
7.	"Aprendiendo el sexo" (transl. "Learning sex")	Farelo; Díaz-Reixa; Martínez; Riutort	El Guincho; Fakeguido; Rawsanches	2:27
8.	"Zorra" (remix) (transl. "Bitch") (featuring Rauw Alejandro)	Farelo; Díaz-Reixa; Te Whiti Warbrick; Scott Storch	El Guincho; Sickdrumz; Storch	3:36
Total length:				20:38

== Personnel ==
=== Vocals ===
- Bad Gyal – vocals (all tracks)
- Rema – vocals (track 2)
- Juanka – vocals (track 3)
- Khea – vocals (track 4)
- Rauw Alejandro – vocals (track 8)

=== Production ===
- El Guincho – featured artist (track 1); production (tracks 1, 3–8)
- Izzy Beats – production (track 2)
- Supa Dups – production (track 2)
- Jasper Harris – production (track 3)
- Star Boy – production (track 3)
- Nely el Arma Secreta – production (track 4)
- Fakeguido – production (tracks 4–7)
- Rawsanches – production (tracks 4, 5, 7)
- Sickdrumz – production (track 8)
- Scott Storch – production (track 8)

=== Technical ===
- Jaycen Joshua – mixing
- DJ Riggins – mixing assistance
- Jacob Richards – mixing assistance
- Mike Seaberg – mixing assistance
- Colin Leonard – mastering engineering (tracks 1, 2, 4–7)
- Rawsanches – recording engineering (tracks 1, 5, 6)
- Deli – recording engineering (track 2)
- Nely el Arma Secreta – recording engineering (track 4)

=== Artwork ===
- Paul Lorant – art design
- Lois Cohen – photography

== Charts ==
=== Weekly charts ===
Weekly chart performance for Warm Up
Chart (2021)	Peak position
Spanish Albums (PROMUSICAE)	5

=== Year-end charts ===
2021 year-end chart performance for Warm Up
Chart (2021)	Position
Spanish Albums (PROMUSICAE)	54

== Release history ==
Release formats for Warm Up
Region	Date	Format	Label	Ref.
Various	19 March 2021	Digital download; streaming	Aftercluv; Interscope	
