= Chulo (song) =

2023 single by Bad Gyal

Single by Bad Gyal
- Language: Spanish
- Released: 10 February 2023
- Genre: Reggaeton
- Length: 2:00
- Label: Universal Latino; Interscope
- Songwriters: Alba Farelo; Marco Borrero; Alejandro Ramírez
- Producer: Mag

Bad Gyal singles chronology
"Real G" (2022)	"Chulo" (2023)	"Qué rico" (2023)

Audio sample
- file; help

"Chulo" is a song recorded by Spanish singer-songwriter Bad Gyal. It was released on 10 February 2023 through Universal Music Latino and Interscope Records. A remix version featuring rappers Tokischa and Young Miko was released on 21 June 2023 as the fourth single from Bad Gyal's debut studio album, La joia (2024). The remix achieved significant success, becoming the first song by Bad Gyal to chart in several countries.

== Composition ==
"Chulo" was written by Alba Farelo, Marco Borrero, and Alejandro Ramírez. The production was handled by Mag. It was composed in the key of F minor with a tempo of 97 beats per minute. It was described as a reggaeton song. According to El Periódico, the lyrics narrate "the desire between two people who do not seek to become intimate in a loving way, but rather want to enjoy sex freely."

== Live performances ==
Bad Gyal performed "Chulo" at the 8th Annual Latin American Music Awards on 20 April 2023 at the MGM Grand Garden Arena.

== Charts ==
=== Weekly charts ===
Weekly chart performance for "Chulo"
Chart (2023–2024)	Peak position
Spain (PROMUSICAE)	16

=== Year-end charts ===
2023 year-end chart performance for "Chulo"
Chart (2023)	Position
Spain (PROMUSICAE)	44

== Certifications ==
Certifications for "Chulo"
Region	Certification	Certified units/sales
Spain (Promusicae)	4× Platinum	160,000^{‡}
United States (RIAA)	Platinum (Latin)	60,000^{‡}
^{‡} Sales+streaming figures based on certification alone.

== Remix ==
"Chulo pt. 2"

Single by Bad Gyal, Tokischa, and Young Miko

from the album La joia
- Language: Spanish
- Released: 21 June 2023
- Length: 3:39
- Label: Universal Latino; Interscope
- Songwriters: Alba Farelo; Marco Borrero; Mag; Mauro; Alejandro Ramírez; Tokischa Peralta; María Ramírez de Arellano
- Producer: Mag

Bad Gyal singles chronology
"Qué Rico REMIX" (2023)	"Chulo pt. 2" (2023)	"Mi Lova" (2023)

Tokischa singles chronology
"Players" (2023)	"Chulo pt. 2" (2023)	"No pare (remix)" (2023)

Young Miko singles chronology
"ID" (2023)	"Chulo pt. 2" (2023)	"Wiggy" (2023)

Music video
- "Chulo pt. 2" on YouTube

On 21 June 2023, Bad Gyal released a remix of the song, titled "Chulo pt. 2", along with Dominican rapper Tokischa and Puerto Rican rapper Young Miko as the fourth single from Bad Gyal's debut studio album, La joia (2024).

In Latin America, the remix achieved significant success, becoming the first song by Bad Gyal to chart in several countries. In the United States, the remix became her highest appearance in the Billboard Global 200 chart since "Kármika". It was certified platinum in the United States and gold in Mexico.

=== Background and composition ===
Bad Gyal called the remix "a very organic collaboration", saying that Tokischa and Young Miko "gave this song a new meaning and transformed it into a very original and perfect continuation, straying away from the typical remix". The production was handled by Mag and Mauro was credited as an additional producer. The cover art was designed by Pol Anglada, who also designed the cover for the original version.

=== Music video ===
A music video for the remix was uploaded to Bad Gyal's YouTube account on 21 June 2023. The video was directed by Artasans and produced by Nora Carbonell, and was shot in Barcelona, Spain. It features the three artists in a limousine "having a wild girls' night out". As of February 2024, the video has received over 203 million views, being Bad Gyal's most viewed video on the platform.

=== Charts ===
==== Weekly charts ====
Weekly chart performance for "Chulo pt. 2"
Chart (2023–2024)	Peak position
Argentina (Argentina Hot 100)	16
Chile (Billboard)	7
Chile Urbano (Monitor Latino)	14
Costa Rica (FONOTICA)	10
Dominican Republic (SODINPRO)	24
Ecuador (Billboard)	11
Global 200 (Billboard)	89
Honduras (Monitor Latino)	9
Honduras Urbano (Monitor Latino)	9
Nicaragua (Monitor Latino)	3
Nicaragua Urbano (Monitor Latino)	3
Paraguay (SGP)	44
Peru (Billboard)	9
Peru (Monitor Latino)	4
Peru Urbano (Monitor Latino)	3
Puerto Rico (Monitor Latino)	9
Puerto Rico Urbano (Monitor Latino)	5
Uruguay (CUD)	18
US Hot Latin Songs (Billboard)	33

==== Year-end charts ====
2023 year-end chart performance for "Chulo pt. 2"
Chart (2023)	Position
Chile Urbano (Monitor Latino)	62
Costa Rica Urbano (Monitor Latino)	39
Dominican Republic Urbano (Monitor Latino)	84
Honduras Urbano (Monitor Latino)	71
Nicaragua (Monitor Latino)	80
Nicaragua Urbano (Monitor Latino)	52
Peru (Monitor Latino)	37
Peru Urbano (Monitor Latino)	24
Puerto Rico (Monitor Latino)	65
Puerto Rico Urbano (Monitor Latino)	39

2024 year-end chart performance for "Chulo pt. 2"
Chart (2024)	Position
Chile Urbano (Monitor Latino)	66
Costa Rica Urbano (Monitor Latino)	64
Honduras (Monitor Latino)	42
Honduras Urbano (Monitor Latino)	30
Nicaragua (Monitor Latino)	29
Nicaragua Urbano (Monitor Latino)	20
Peru (Monitor Latino)	22
Peru Urbano (Monitor Latino)	13

=== Certifications ===
Certifications for "Chulo pt. 2"
Region	Certification	Certified units/sales
Mexico (AMPROFON)	Gold	70,000^{‡}
United States (RIAA)	6× Platinum (Latin)	360,000^{‡}
^{‡} Sales+streaming figures based on certification alone.
