= Zorra (Bad Gyal song) =

2019 single by Bad Gyal

Single by Bad Gyal
- Language: Spanish
- English title: 'Bitch' / 'Slut' / 'Whore'
- B-side: "Aprendiendo el sexo"
- Released: 12 December 2019
- Length: 3:06
- Label: Aftercluv; Interscope
- Songwriters: Alba Farelo; Scott Storch; Te Whiti Warbrick
- Producers: Sickdrumz; Scott Storch

Bad Gyal singles chronology
"Alocao" (2019)	"Zorra" (2019)	"Tú eres un bom bom (remix)" (2020)

Music video
- "Zorra" on YouTube

"Zorra" (Spanish for 'Bitch' / 'Slut' / 'Whore') is a song recorded by Spanish singer-songwriter Bad Gyal. It was released on 12 December 2019 through Aftercluv Dance Lab and Interscope Records. A remix version was released on 21 January 2021 along with Puerto Rican singer Rauw Alejandro as the third single from Bad Gyal's debut extended play (EP), Warm Up (2021).

== Composition ==
"Zorra" was written by Alba Farelo, Scott Storch and Te Whiti Warbrick. It was composed in the key of B major with a tempo of 176 beats per minute. Considered a feminist song, Bad Gyal reappropiates Spanish misogynistic slur zorra and uses it on an unfaithful man.

== Music video ==
The accompanying music video for "Zorra" was released along with the song and it was directed by Manson. It was filmed in July 2019 in the Barri Gaudí, Reus.

== Charts ==
=== Weekly charts ===
Weekly chart performance for "Zorra"
Chart (2019)	Peak position
Spain (PROMUSICAE)	2

=== Year-end charts ===
2020 year-end chart performance for "Zorra"
Chart (2020)	Position
Spain (PROMUSICAE)	80

2021 year-end chart performance for "Zorra"
Chart (2021)	Position
Spain (PROMUSICAE)	95

== Certifications ==
Certifications for "Zorra"
Region	Certification	Certified units/sales
Spain (Promusicae)	4× Platinum	240,000^{‡}
^{‡} Sales+streaming figures based on certification alone.

== Remix ==
"Zorra (remix)"

Single by Bad Gyal and Rauw Alejandro

from the EP Warm Up
- Language: Spanish
- Released: 21 January 2021
- Length: 3:36
- Label: Aftercluv; Interscope
- Songwriters: Alba Farelo; Rauw Alejandro; Scott Storch; Sickdrumz; El Guincho
- Producers: Scott Storch; Sickdrumz; El Guincho

Bad Gyal singles chronology
"Blin blin" (2020)	"Zorra (remix)" (2021)	"Judas" (2021)

Rauw Alejandro singles chronology
"La curiosidad" (2020)	"Zorra (remix)" (2021)	"Baila conmigo" (2021)

Music video
- "Zorra (remix)" on YouTube

On 21 January 2021, Bad Gyal released a remix of "Zorra" along with Puerto Rican singer Rauw Alejandro as the third single from Bad Gyal's debut extended play (EP), Warm Up (2021).

=== Music video ===
The accompanying music video for "Zorra (remix)" was released along with the song and it was directed by Pawla Casanovas and Javier Peralvo.

== Release history ==
Release history and formats for "Zorra"
Region	Date	Format	Version	Label	Ref.
Various	12 December 2019	Digital download; streaming	Original	Aftercluv; Interscope	
Various	21 January 2021	Digital download; streaming	Remix	Aftercluv; Interscope	
Spain	5 March 2021	10" vinyl	Original	Aftercluv; Interscope	
