= 2023 Rolling Stone en Español Awards =

2023 Latin music, film and television Awards

- Date: October 26, 2023
- Venue: The Fillmore; Miami, United States
- Hosted by: Renata Notni

Highlights
- Most awards: Natalia Lafourcade (3)
- Most nominations: Bad Bunny (6)

Television/radio coverage
- Network: TNT; HBO Max

The 1st Rolling Stone en Español Awards took place on October 26, 2023, at The Fillmore in Miami, United States, presented to recognize excellence in Ibero-American music releases, films and television productions of 2023. The ceremony was hosted by Mexican actress Renata Notni and broadcast on TNT and HBO Max.

The awards ceremony was announced in 2023 by the Spanish language edition of the American magazine Rolling Stone, intended to "highlight creations that have outstanding cultural impact, innovation, originality, boldness, quality, and a significant contribution to the industry".

The nominations were announced on August 10, 2023, with Puerto Rican singer Bad Bunny leading the nominations with six, followed by Rosalía with five, and Natalia Lafourcade, Guitarricadelafuente, Karol G and Juanes, all with four each. In the film and series categories, Argentine film Argentina, 1985 led the nominations with four, followed by the films The Beasts, 1976, Bardo, False Chronicle of a Handful of Truths, Official Competition and The Pack; and the series Belascoarán and News of a Kidnapping, all with three.

== Performers ==
List of musical performances
Artist(s)	Song(s)
Humbe	"CÓMO RESPIRAR???"
Elena Rose	"Disculpa Amiga"
iLe; Ivy Queen	"Algo Bonito"
Silvana Estrada	"Te Guardo"
Ximena Sariñana; Juan Pablo Vega	"Tenemos Que Hablar"
Kevin Kaarl	"mis compas tan aquí" "San Lucas"
Villano Antillano	"Kaleidoscópica"
Jay Wheeler	"Pacto" "Repeat"
Natalia Lafourcade	"De Todas las Flores"
Pedro Capó	"Volver a Casa"
Tiago PZK; Lit Killah	"luxxx"
Reik	"El Correcto" "Ya Me Enteré" "Me Niego" "Creo en Ti"
Ryan Castro	"Quema" "Ghetto Star"
Omar Montes	"La Llama del Amor"
Carín León	"Primera Cita" "Según Quién"

== Winners and nominees ==
The nominees were announced on August 10, 2023. The winners appear first and in bold.

=== Music ===
Music categories
**Album of the Year**: **De Todas las Flores – Natalia Lafourcade (Adan Jodorowsky & Lafourcade, producers)**; Bailando Hasta el Apagón – Vetusta Morla (Carles Campi Campón & Vetusta Morla, producers); Fórmula, Vol. 3 – Romeo Santos (Iván Chevere & Santos, producers); Futurología Arlt – Fito Páez (Diego Olivero, Gustavo Borner & Páez, producers); La Cantera – Guitarricadelafuente (Raül Refree, producer); La Neta – Pedro Capó (Diego Contento & Capó, producers); La sustancia X – Villano Antillano (Ismael Cancel & Villano Antillano, producers); Mañana Será Bonito – Karol G (Various producers); Marchita – Silvana Estrada (Gustavo Guerrero, producer); Mesa Dulce – Dante Spinetta (Spinetta, producer); Motomami – Rosalía (Various producers); Nacarile – iLe (iLe & Ismael Cancel, producers); Ozutochi – Ozuna (Various producers); Tinta y Tiempo – Jorge Drexler (Carles Campi Campón & Drexler, producers); Un Verano Sin Ti – Bad Bunny (Various producers); Vida Cotidiana – Juanes (Emmanuel Briceño, Juanes & Sebastian Krys, producers)	**Song of the Year**: **"Villano Antillano: Bzrp Music Sessions, Vol. 51" – Bizarrap + Villano Antillano (Gonzalo Julián Conde & Villana Santiago Pacheco, songwriters)**; "Algo Bonito" – iLe + Ivy Queen (David Alberto Pinto, Ileana Cabra, Ismael Cancel & Ivy Queen, songwriters); "Dance Crip" – Trueno (Brian Taylor, Mateo Palacios Corazzina & Santiago Ruiz, songwriters); "Despechá" – Rosalía (Chris Jedi, David Rodríguez, Dylan Wiggins, Gaby Music, Nino Segarra, Noah Goldstein & Rosalía Vila Tobella, songwriters); "Hey Mor" – Ozuna + Feid (Andres Jael Correa, Gerald Oscar Jimenez, Jan Carlos Ozuna Rosado & Salomon Villada Hoyos, songwriters); "La Jumpa" – Arcángel + Bad Bunny (Austin Santos & Benito Martínez Ocasio, songwriters); "Llévame Viento" – Natalia Lafourcade (Lafourcade, songwriter); "La Bachata" – Manuel Turizo (Andrés Jael Correa Ríos, Juan Diego Medina, Vélez, Luis Miguel Gómez Castaño "Casta", Manuel Turizo Zapata & Edgar Barrera, songwriters); "Monotonía" – Shakira + Ozuna (Albert Hype, Alejandro Robledo Valencia, Cristian Camilo Álvarez, Juan Carlos Ozuna Rosado, Kevyn Mauricio Cruz, Sergio Robledo & Shakira Mebarak, songwriters); "Provenza" – Karol G (Carolina Giraldo Navarro, Daniel Echavarria Oviedo & Kevyn Mauricio Cruz Moreno, songwriters); "¿Quién Endendió la Luz?" – Guitarricadelafuente (Álvaro Lafuente Calvo, songwriter); "Sudaka" – Dante Spinetta + Trueno (Spinetta, songwriter); "This Is Not America" – Residente + Ibeyi (Jeffrey Peñalva, Lisa-Kaindé Díaz, Naomi Díaz & René Pérez Joglar, songwriters); "Tití Me Preguntó" – Bad Bunny (Benito Martínez Ocasio & MAG, songwriters); "Tocarte" – Jorge Drexler + C. Tangana (Antón Álvarez Alfaro, Jorge Drexler, Pablo Drexler & Víctor Martínez, songwriters); "Volver a Casa" – Pedro Capó (Capó, songwriter)
**Artist of the Year**: **Natalia Lafourcade**; Bad Bunny; Bizarrap; Christian Nodal; Feid; Fito Páez; iLe; Jorge Drexler; Juanes; Karol G; Rosalía; Shakira	**Promising Artist of the Year**: **Kevin Kaarl**; Aitana; Guitarricadelafuente; Humbe; Omar Apollo; Omar Montes; Peso Pluma; Silvana Estrada; Trueno; Villano Antillano; Yahritza y su Esencia; Young Miko
**Voice of the Audience**: **Tiago PZK**; Alempan; Álvaro Díaz; Bad Gyal; Cazzu; Danna; Elena Rose; Gera MX; Humbe; Jay Wheeler; Kenia Os; Kevin Kaarl; Myke Towers; Ryan Castro; Silvana Estrada; Young Miko	**Music Producer of the Year**: **Tainy**; Arca; Bizarrap; Carles Campón Brugada; Edgar Barrera; Juan Pablo Vega; Mag; Natalia Lafourcade; Ovy on the Drums; Rosalía; Raül Refree; Sebastian Krys
**Video of the Year**: **"Solo Por Ser Indios" (Official Animated Video) – A.N.I.M.A.L. + Juanes (Penumbrart, director)**; "ARRANCARMELO" – WOS (Rafael Nir & Tomás Curland, directors); "Canción Desaparecida" – Juanes + Mabiland (Kacho López Mari, director); "Mil y Una Noches" – Guitarricadelafuente (Pedro Artola, director); "Ojitos Lindos" – Bad Bunny + Bomba Estéreo (Stillz, director); "Provenza" – Karol G (Pedro Artola, director); "Saoko" – Rosalía (Valentin Petit, director); "Sudaka" – Dante Spinetta + Trueno (Hernán Corera & Juan Piczman, directors); "Te Quería" – Lido Pimienta (J. Gallardo Kattah, director); "Tenemos Que Hablar" – Juan Pablo Vega + Ximena Sariñana (Estefanía Piñeres, director); "This Is Not America" – Residente + Ibeyi (Greg Ohrel, director); "Where She Goes" – Bad Bunny (Stillz, director)

=== Film & Series ===
Film & series categories
**Fiction Feature Film of the Year**: **The Beasts (Rodrigo Sorogoyen, director; Isabel Peña & Sorogoyen, writers / Spain)**; 1976 (Manuela Martelli, director; Alejandra Moffat & Martelli, writers / Chile); Alcarràs (Carla Simón, director; Simón & Arnau Vilaró, writers / Spain); Argentina, 1985 (Santiago Mitre, director; Mitre & Mariano Llinás, writers / Argentina); Bardo, False Chronicle of a Handful of Truths (Alejandro González Iñárritu, director; González Iñárritu & Nicolás Giacobone, writers / Mexico); Piggy (Carlota Pereda, director and writer / Spain); Official Competition (Gastón Duprat & Mariano Cohn, directors; Gastón Duprat, Mariano Cohn & Andrés Duprat, writers / Spain); Huesera: The Bone Woman (Michelle Garza Cervera, director; Garza Cervera & Abia Castillo, writers / Mexico); The Extortion (Martino Zaidelis, director; Emanuel Diez, writer / Argentina); The Pack (Andrés Ramírez Pulido, director and writer / Colombia); The Kings of the World (Laura Mora Ortega, director; María Camila Arias & Ortega, writers / Colombia); Utama (Alejandro Loayza Grisi, director and writer / Bolivia)	**Series of the Year**: **El Amor Después del Amor (Felipe Gómez Aparicio, & Gonzalo Tobal, directors; Juan Pablo Kolodziej, series creator / Argentina)**; Belascoarán (Ernesto Contreras, Hiromi Kamata & Gonzalo Amat, directors; Rodrigo Santos, series creator / Mexico); División Palermo (Santiago Korovsky & Diego Núñez Irigoyen, directors; Korovsky, series creator / Argentina); Hasta el Cielo (Jorge Guerricaechevarría & Daniel Calparsoro, directors and series creators / Spain); Eva Lasting (Dago García & Mateo Stivelberg, directors; Dago García, series creator / Colombia); Las pelotaris 1926 (Marc Cistaré, Jesús Rodrigo & Jacob Santana, directors; Cistaré, series creator / Mexico); Los Enviados (Juan José Campanella, Hiromi Kamata, Martino Zaidelis & Camilo Antolini, directors; Campanella, series creator / Argentina); Nacho (David Pinillos, Beatriz Sanchís & Eduardo Casanova, directors; Teresa Fernández-Valdés & Ramón Campos, series creators / Spain); I Don't Like Driving (Borja Cobeaga, director and series creator / Spain); News of a Kidnapping (Andrés Wood & Julio Jorquera Arriagada, directors; Wood & Rodrigo García, series creators / Chile, Colombia); The Marked Heart (Camilo Vega, director; Leonardo Padrón, series creator / Colombia); Santa Evita (Rodrigo García & Alejandro Maci, directors; García, series creator / Argentina)
**Documentary Feature Film of the Year**: **Hip Hop X Siempre (Jessy Terrero, director / Dominican Republic, United States)**; Alis (Clare Weiskopf & Nicolas van Hemelryck, directors / Colombia); Eami (Paz Encina, director / Paraguay); The Echo (Tatiana Huezo, director / Mexico); María Luisa Bemberg: El Eco de Mi Voz (Alejandro Maci, director / Argentina); The Yellow Ceiling (Isabel Coixet, director / Spain); Los Sobrevivientes (Rosario Cervio, director / Chile); Mi Casa Está en Otra Parte (Carlos Hagerman & Jorge Villalobos, directors / Mexico); My Imaginary Country (Patricio Guzmán, director / Chile); Si Dios Fuera Mujer (Angélica Cervera, director / Colombia); Sintiéndolo Mucho (Fernando León de Aranoa, director / Spain); Una Mirada Honesta (Roberto Persano, Santiago Nacif Cabrera, directors / Argentina)	**Director of the Year**: **Alejandro González Iñárritu – Bardo, False Chronicle of a Handful of Truths (Mexico)**; Alejandro Loayza Grisi – Utama (Bolivia); Andrés Ramírez Pulido – The Pack (Colombia); Carla Simón – Alcarràs (Spain); Francisca Alegría – The Cow Who Sang a Song Into the Future (Chile); Laura Baumeister – Daughter of Rage (Nicaragua); Laura Mora Ortega – The Kings of the World (Colombia); Gastón Duprat, Mariano Cohn – Official Competition (Spain); Manuela Martelli – 1976 (Chile); Michelle Garza Cervera – Huesera: The Bone Woman (Mexico); Rodrigo Sorogoyen – The Beasts (Spain); Santiago Mitre – Argentina, 1985 (Argentina)
**Performance of the Year**: **Ricardo Darín – Argentina, 1985 as Julio César Strassera (Argentina)**; Aline Küppenheim – 1976 as Carmen (Chile); Cristina Umaña – News of a Kidnapping as Maruja Pachón (Chile, Colombia); Daniel Giménez Cacho – Bardo, False Chronicle of a Handful of Truths as Silverio Gama (Mexico); Guillermo Francella – El Encargado as Eliseo (Argentina); Jhojan Estiven Jiménez – The Pack as Eliú (Colombia); Juan Diego Botto – I Don't Like Driving as Pablo Lopetegui (Spain); Juan Pablo Raba – News of a Kidnapping as Alberto Villamizar (Chile, Colombia); Laia Costa – Lullaby as Amaia (Spain); Laura Galán – Piggy as Sara (Spain); Luis Gerardo Méndez – Belascoarán as Héctor Belascoarán (Mexico); Marina Foïs – The Beasts as Olga (Spain); Natalia Oreiro – Santa Evita as Eva Perón (Argentina); Paulina Gaitán – Belascoarán as Irene (Mexico); Penélope Cruz – Official Competition as Lola Cuevas (Spain); Peter Lanzani – Argentina, 1985 as Luis Moreno Ocampo (Argentina)

=== Special awards ===
- Legacy Award: **Ivy Queen & Natalia Lafourcade**
- Pioneer Award: **Tainy**
- Pride Symbol Award: **Villano Antillano**
- Latin American Icon Tribute: **El rey, Vicente Fernández**
- Viva Mexico Award: **Carín León**
