= 1976 (film) =

- Film poster
- Directed by: Manuela Martelli
- Written by: Manuela Martelli; Alejandra Moffat
- Produced by: Omar Zúñiga Hidalgo Alejandra García; Nathalia Videla Peña; Dominga Sotomayor; Andrés Wood; Juan Pablo Gugliotta
- Starring: Aline Kuppenheim; Nicolás Sepúlveda; Hugo Medina; Alejandro Goic; Carmen Gloria Martínez; Antonia Zegers; Marcial Tagle
- Cinematography: Yarará Rodríguez
- Edited by: Camila Mercadal
- Music by: Mariá Portugal
- Production companies: Cinestación; Magma Cine (Argentina); Wood Producciones S.A
- Release dates: 26 May 2022 (Cannes); 20 October 2022 (Chile)
- Running time: 95 minutes
- Countries: Chile; Argentina
- Language: Spanish
- Box office: $549,926

1976, also known as Chile '76 in North America, is a 2022 drama film directed by Manuela Martelli in her directorial debut, with a screenplay co-written by Martelli and Alejandra Moffat. An international co-production between Chile and Argentina, the film premiered on 26 May 2022, in the Directors' Fortnight section at the Cannes Film Festival and was released in Chilean cinemas on 20 October 2022. It was nominated in the Best Ibero-American Film category at the 37th Goya Awards.

== Plot ==
Carmen, a 50-year-old housewife from a middle-class family, enjoys a comfortable life in Santiago with her successful and respected doctor husband Miguel and their adult children. In the winter of 1976, three years after Augusto Pinochet seized power in Chile through a coup and established a military dictatorship, Carmen travels to her summer house to oversee renovation work and take some time for herself. While there, Father Sánchez, the priest of the small coastal town, asks for her help in caring for Elías, a young man who is part of the resistance against the dictator, has been wounded by a bullet, and has taken refuge with him. Because Carmen has medical knowledge and had once aspired to study medicine herself, and has also been involved in charitable projects in the church, she agrees to assist.

== Cast ==
- Aline Kuppenheim as Carmen
- Nicolás Sepúlveda as Elías
- Hugo Medina as Father Sánchez
- Alejandro Goic as Miguel
- Carmen Gloria Martínez as Estela
- Antonia Zegers as Raquel
- Marcial Tagle as Osvaldo
- Amalia Kassai as Leonor
- Gabriel Urzúa as Tomás
- Luis Cerda as Pedro
- Ana Clara Delfino as Clara
- Elena Delfino as Elenita
- Mauricio Pesutic as Eugenio

== Production ==
1976 was directed by Chilean filmmaker Manuela Martelli, who co-wrote the screenplay with Alejandra Moffat. Martelli had previously worked on the Chilean horror stop-motion animated film La casa lobo. With 1976, Martelli made her feature film directorial debut, while also having appeared in more than 15 films as an actress.

The film is set in 1976, the year when Martelli's maternal grandmother died, and she wanted to explore the experiences that told the story of a different reality through family videos shot with a Super-8 camera.

The lead role of the housewife Carmen is played by Aline Küppenheim, a Chilean theater, film, and television actress of French descent, considered one of the greatest performers in her home country. Küppenheim gained international recognition for her role in Sebastián Lelio's A Fantastic Woman. The film also stars Nicolás Sepúlveda, who plays the wounded man named Elías, and Hugo Medina, who plays Padre Sánchez.

Filming took place in the summer of 2021, partly in Las Cruces, a holiday resort in the Chilean coastal town/municipality of El Tabo in the Valparaíso region. Yarará Rodríguez served as the cinematographer, while the film's score was composed by Brazilian jazz and improvisational musician Mariá Portugal.

== Release ==
1976 premiered at the Cannes Film Festival in May 2022, where it was shown in the Directors' Fortnight section. It was also screened at several other film festivals, including the Melbourne International Film Festival, the San Sebastián International Film Festival, the Hamburg Film Festival, the Osnabrück Film Festival, the Chicago International Film Festival, the Göteborg International Film Festival, the Tokyo International Film Festival, the BFI London Film Festival and the Palm Springs International Film Festival.

== Reception ==
=== Critical response ===
According to the review aggregation website Rotten Tomatoes, 1976 has a 91% approval rating based on 56 reviews from critics, with an average rating of 7.3/10. The site's consensus reads, "Chile '76 is an intriguing historical noir that radiographs Pinochet's patronizing and patriarchal society through the eyes of a steely bourgeoise woman who dares to take a stand". On Metacritic, which uses a weighted average, the film holds a score of 78 out of 100 based on 18 reviews, indicating "generally favorable reviews".

=== Accolades ===
Award	Date of ceremony	Category	Recipient(s)	Result	Ref.
Ariel Awards	9 September 2023	Best Ibero-American Film	1976	Nominated	
Athens International Film Festival	7 April 2022	Best Film	1976	Nominated	
Athens International Film Festival	7 April 2022	Best Director	Manuela Martelli	Won	
Brussels International Film Festival	2 July 2022	Jury Prize	1976	Nominated	
Caleuche Awards	29 January 2023	Best Actress in a Film	Aline Küppenheim	Won	
Caleuche Awards	29 January 2023	Best Supporting Actor in a Film	Hugo Medina	Won	
Caleuche Awards	29 January 2023	Best Supporting Actor in a Film	Nicolás Sepúlveda	Nominated	
Cannes Film Festival	28 May 2022	Caméra d'Or	Manuela Martelli	Nominated	
Directors Guild of America Awards	10 February 2024	Outstanding Directing – First-Time Feature Film	Manuela Martelli	Nominated	
Goya Awards	11 February 2023	Best Ibero-American Film	1976	Nominated	
Jerusalem Film Festival	31 July 2022	Best International Debut	Manuela Martelli	Won	
Lima Film Festival	12 August 2022	Trophy Spondylus	1976	Nominated	
Lima Film Festival	12 August 2022	Best Actress	Aline Kuppenheim	Won	
Lima Film Festival	12 August 2022	Best Debut	Manuela Martelli	Won	
Lima Film Festival	12 August 2022	APRECI Award for Best Film in Competition	1976	Won	
London Film Festival	16 October 2022	Sutherland Award for Best First Feature Film	1976	Won	
Palm Springs International Film Festival	16 January 2023	Best Ibero-American Film	1976	Won	
Platino Awards	22 April 2023	Best First Feature Film	1976	Won	
Platino Awards	22 April 2023	Best Actress	Aline Küppenheim	Nominated	
Platino Awards	22 April 2023	Best Screenplay	Manuela Martelli, Alejandra Moffat	Nominated	
Platino Awards	22 April 2023	Best Art Direction	Francisca Correa	Nominated	
Rolling Stone en Español Awards	26 October 2023	Fiction Feature Film of the Year	1976	Nominated	
Rolling Stone en Español Awards	26 October 2023	Direction of the Year	Manuela Martelli	Nominated	
Rolling Stone en Español Awards	26 October 2023	Performance of the Year	Aline Küppenheim	Nominated	
San Sebastián International Film Festival	24 September 2022	Latin Horizons Award	Manuela Martelli	Nominated	
Tokyo International Film Festival	2 November 2022	Tokyo Grand Prix	1976	Nominated	
Tokyo International Film Festival	2 November 2022	Best Actress	Aline Küppenheim	Won	
Valdivia International Film Festival	16 October 2022	Best Chilean Feature Film	1976	Won	
