= Villano Antillano =

Puerto Rican rapper (born 1995)

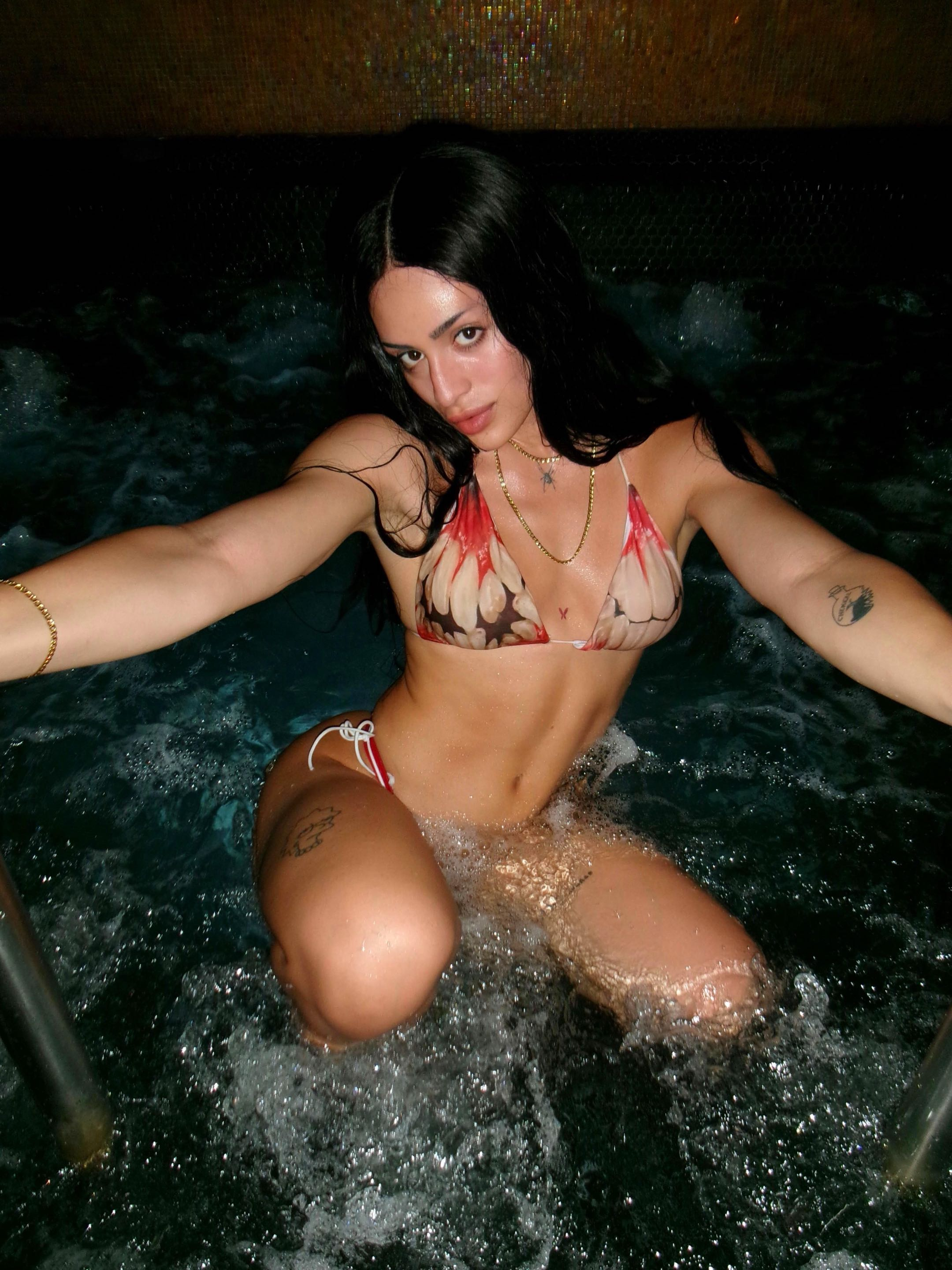
- Antillano in 2026
- Born: March 27, 1995 (age 31); Bayamón, Puerto Rico
- Other name: Villana Santiago Pacheco
- Education: Universidad del Sagrado Corazón
- Occupations: Rapper; singer; songwriter
- Years active: 2018–present

Villana Santiago Pacheco (born March 27, 1995), known professionally as Villano Antillano (Latin American Spanish pronunciation: [biˈʝano antiˈʝano]), is a Puerto Rican rapper, singer and songwriter. She (Note: Antillano uses she/her and they/them pronouns. This article uses she/her for consistency.) gained recognition in 2022 with the release of "Bzrp Music Sessions, Vol. 51" alongside producer Bizarrap. In 2026 she released her third studio album, Ante el Umbral del Peligro No Siento Temor.

== Early life ==
Antillano was born on March 27, 1995, in Bayamón, Puerto Rico. From an early stage, Antillano had an interest in music, one of her first musical inspirations being Rubén Blades. She grew up with four siblings in a conservative household and left the family home at the age of 17.

== Career ==
Antillano started her career in 2019 with her extended play Tiranía, which deals with themes of prejudice against LGBT people.

Since then, Antillano has released music regularly, collaborating with artists from the new wave of Puerto Rican music artists such as Young Miko or Paopao. Her lyrics are loaded with messages against machismo and homophobia present in urban music. At the time she still presented as a male artist; she later said she only came to understand herself as a musician once she understood herself as a woman.

In June 2022, she released "Villano Antillano: Bzrp Music Sessions, Vol. 51" with Argentine producer Bizarrap, a song that catapulted her to international fame outside the queer sphere. It reached number 11 on the Argentina Hot 100, as well as going number 5 in Spain, 23 in Colombia, 25 in Mexico, 18 in Peru and number 8 in Uruguay. In the same year she paid tribute to Ivy Queen on stage and made a surprise guest appearance during Bad Bunny's Un Verano Sin Ti tour at the Coliseo de Puerto Rico. Rolling Stone described her as the first prominent trans artist in Latin rap.

In 2026, Antillano released her third studio album, Ante el Umbral del Peligro No Siento Temor ("At the Threshold of Danger, I Feel No Fear"), produced by the Spanish producer Groove 2070. The album blends trap, reggaeton and experimental EDM, and its lyrics deal with her migration from Puerto Rico to Spain. The track "entre2AGUAS" refers to that move, while "CRACK" addresses violence against women and the experiences of trans women; a music video for "CRACK" was released on the same day as the album.

== Personal life ==
Antillano identifies as a transfemme non-binary person. Antillano uses she/her and they/them pronouns. She is a transfeminist. As of 2026, Antillano lives in Madrid.

== Discography ==
=== Albums ===
- La sustancia X (2022)
- Miss Misogyny (2024)
- Ante el Umbral del Peligro No Siento Temor (2026)

=== Extended plays ===
- Tiranía (2019)
- Ketaprincesa (2020)
- Hembrismo (Paopao, La Gabi and Villano Antillano featuring ARIA VEGA and Cami Da Baby) (2022)

=== Singles ===
==== As lead artist ====
List of singles as lead artist, showing year released, chart positions, certifications, and originating album
Title	Year	Peak chart positions						Certifications	Album
Title	Year	ARG	COL	MEX	PER	SPA	URU	Certifications	Album
"Prende"	2020	—	—	—	—	—	—		Non-album single
"Culo"	2020	—	—	—	—	—	—		Non-album single
"Brillo"	2020	—	—	—	—	—	—		Non-album single
"Pájara"	2020	—	—	—	—	—	—		Non-album single
"Toro mecánico" (with Skeptic Musica)	2021	—	—	—	—	—	—		Non-album single
"Muñeca" (with Ana Macho)	2021	—	—	—	—	—	—		Non-album single
"Vendetta" (with Young Miko)	2021	—	—	—	—	—	—		Non-album single
"Hebilla" (paopao, La Gabi and Villano Antillano featuring Aria Vega and Cami Da Baby)	2022	—	—	—	—	—	—		Hembrismo
"Veo veo" (with Rapetón Approved)	2022	—	—	—	—	—	—		Non-album single
"Vocales"	2022	—	—	—	—	—	—		Non-album single
"Bzrp Music Sessions, Vol. 51" (with Bizarrap)	2022	11	23	25	18	5	8	PROMUSICAE: 3× Platinum	Non-album single
"KLK"	2022	—	—	—	—	—	—		Non-album single
"Mujerón" (with Ptazeta)	2022	—	—	—	—	—	—		Non-album single
"Besties (remix)" (Joyce Santana and Young Miko featuring Luar la L, Villano Antillano and Yovngchimi)	2022	—	—	—	—	—	—		Non-album single
"Activa" (with Chesca and Corina Smith)	2022	—	—	—	—	—	—		Non-album single
"Cáscara de coco"	2022	—	—	—	—	—	—		La sustancia X
"Cuero"	2023	—	—	—	—	—	—		Non-album single
"—" denotes a recording that did not chart or was not released in that territory.

==== As featured artist ====
List of singles as featured artist, showing year released
Title	Year
"Fuetazo" (Isabella Lovestory featuring Villano Antillano)	2023
"ROCKSTAR" (Pabllo Vittar featuring Villano Antillano)	2026

== Awards and nominations ==
Award	Year	Category	Nominated work	Result	Ref.
GLAAD Media Awards	2025	Outstanding Breakthrough Music Artist	Herself	Nominated	
MTV Millennial Awards	2023	Artist to Watch	Herself	Nominated	
MTV Millennial Awards	2024	Viral Anthem	"Ride or Die, PT. 2" (with Sevdaliza & Tokischa)	Nominated	
Premios Juventud	2022	Girl Power	"Roce" (with Paopao, La Gabi, Aria Vega and Cami Da Baby)	Nominated	
Premios Juventud	2023	Girl Power	"Activa" (with Chesca & Corina Smith)	Nominated	
Premios Juventud	2023	Female Artist – On The Rise	Herself	Nominated	
Premios Lo Nuestro	2023	New Artist – Female	Herself	Nominated	
Premios Lo Nuestro	2024	Female Urban Artist of the Year	Herself	Nominated	
Premios Lo Nuestro	2024	Urban Album of the Year	La Sustancia X	Nominated	
Premios Tu Música Urbano	2023	Top New Artist – Female	Herself	Nominated	
Rolling Stone en Español Awards	2023	Album of the Year	La Sustancia X	Nominated	
Rolling Stone en Español Awards	2023	Song of the Year	"Villano Antillano: Bzrp Music Sessions, Vol. 51" (with Bizarrap)	Won	
Rolling Stone en Español Awards	2023	Promising Artist of the Year	Herself	Nominated	
Rolling Stone en Español Awards	2023	Pride Symbol	Herself	Won	
