= Neoperreo =

Subgenre of reggaeton

- Other names: Neo-perreo
- Stylistic origins: Reggaeton, hyperpop, witch house, trap, moombahton, hip-hop, Latin pop
- Cultural origins: Late 2010s, Latin America and Spain
- Typical instruments: Electronic instruments; vocals

Neoperreo is a subgenre of reggaeton with some degree of popularity in Los Angeles, Mexico City, and Chile. Among the most prominent acts of the scene are Tomasa del Real from Chile and Ms Nina from Argentina. Within the United States, neoperreo is more popular in Los Angeles than in Miami, where traditional reggaeton prevails.

== Origins and characteristics ==
Emerging in parallel with the rise of reggaeton as a mainstream genre globally, neoperreo is characterized by a darker production style that is less pop-oriented than that of the genre's most popular artists. In addition, neoperreo has been noted for having a strong presence of queer and female artists, as well as lyrics that often relate to subverting or re-appropriating gender stereotypes, especially those relating to sexuality. The term was coined as a hashtag by Tomasa del Real and Ms Nina, pioneering figures of the subgenre.

Neoperreo is also characterized by its eclectic character. In addition to the aforementioned influences, neoperreo frequently incorporates elements from electronic music. In particular, in the early stages of the movement, several artists utilized the sound of witch house.

== Development ==
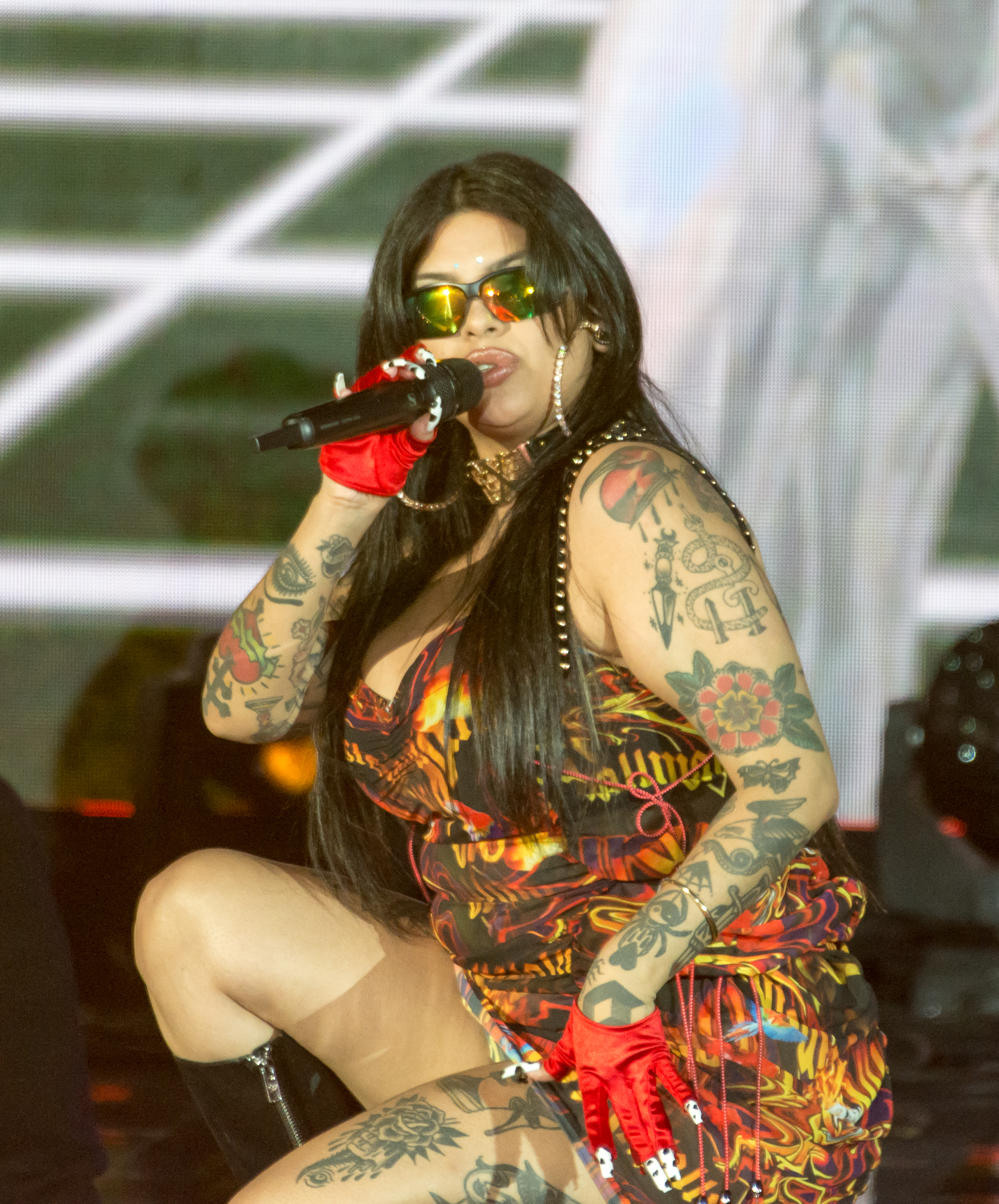
The singer Tomasa del Real performing at a concert in Santiago, Chile in July 2019.

Neoperreo establishes links with dembow and classical reggaeton, particularly with artists like Ivy Queen, whose feminist lyrics and demands for sexual autonomy have been considered a precedent. Reggaeton from this era is considered by these artists to be closer to the street-oriented roots of the genre, more corporeal and embodie while being less influenced by pop sensibilities. In this sense, Del Real has indicated that in neoperreo, "perreo has been converted into a social lubricant" that was being lost with new iterations of the genre. Neoperreo artists' lyrics highlight the antiracist, feminist, and inclusive aspects of reggaeton through a celebratory, festive lens, building alliances and creating safe spaces for "the freaks, the weirdos, the misfits." For these reasons, some analysts have considered the subgenre to be "a revolution" in reggaeton, contributing to a paradigm shift in how the genre is approached from a feminist and queer perspective that places emphasis on sexual liberty.

Very recently, neoperreo has been shaped by influences from deconstructed club, which revisits the language of classic reggaeton from an experimental and abrasive lens, mixing in elements of other genres. Artists doing this include Safety Trance, Kamixlo, Kelman Duran, Dinamarca, and most notably Arca, in songs on her albums Kick I and Kick II like "KLK" with Rosalía, "Prada", "Rakata", and "Tiro".

Despite its underground origins, in the late 2010s and early 2020s, the popularity of neoperreo grew significantly, influencing popular albums such as Motomami by Rosalía, as well as artists like Bad Gyaland La Zowi.

Red Bull Music has been a patron of neoperreo artists.

== Artists and aesthetics ==
Besides Tomasa del Real and Ms Nina, other figures usually cited as part of the subgenre are La Goony Chonga, Bea Pelea, Paul Marmota, DJ Florentino, Bad Gyal, DJ Sustancia, Lizz and Isabella Lovestory. The internet has been considered fundamental to the spread of the subgenre, and artists frequently have made use of an aesthetic that combines futuristic elements or net art with other aesthetics associated more with hood culture and the origins of reggaeton. Many artists like Isabella Lovestory and lila sky started posting their music independently to SoundCloud before collaborating with producers. Producer Dinamarca has notably worked with a number of artists on the list below including Meth Math, La Favi, Six Sex, Isabella Lovestory, and Ms Nina.

=== Associated artists ===
- Tomasa del Real
- Ms Nina
- Bad Gyal
- La Goony Chonga
- Lizz
- Bea Pelea
- Isabella Lovestory
- Safety Trance
- Akriila
- Meth Math
- Paul Marmota
- Dinamarca
- DJ Florentino
- Kamixlo
- Merca Bae
- Six Sex
- Tayhana
- King Doudou
- La Favi
- Rosa Pistola
- TECH GRL
- Virgen María
- Sassyggirl
- Yajaira la Beyaca
- Ratchet Racer
- Fake City Quiet Pills
- Chzter
- lila sky
- cherry chola
- arca
