= La Favi =

American singer-songwriter (born 1990)

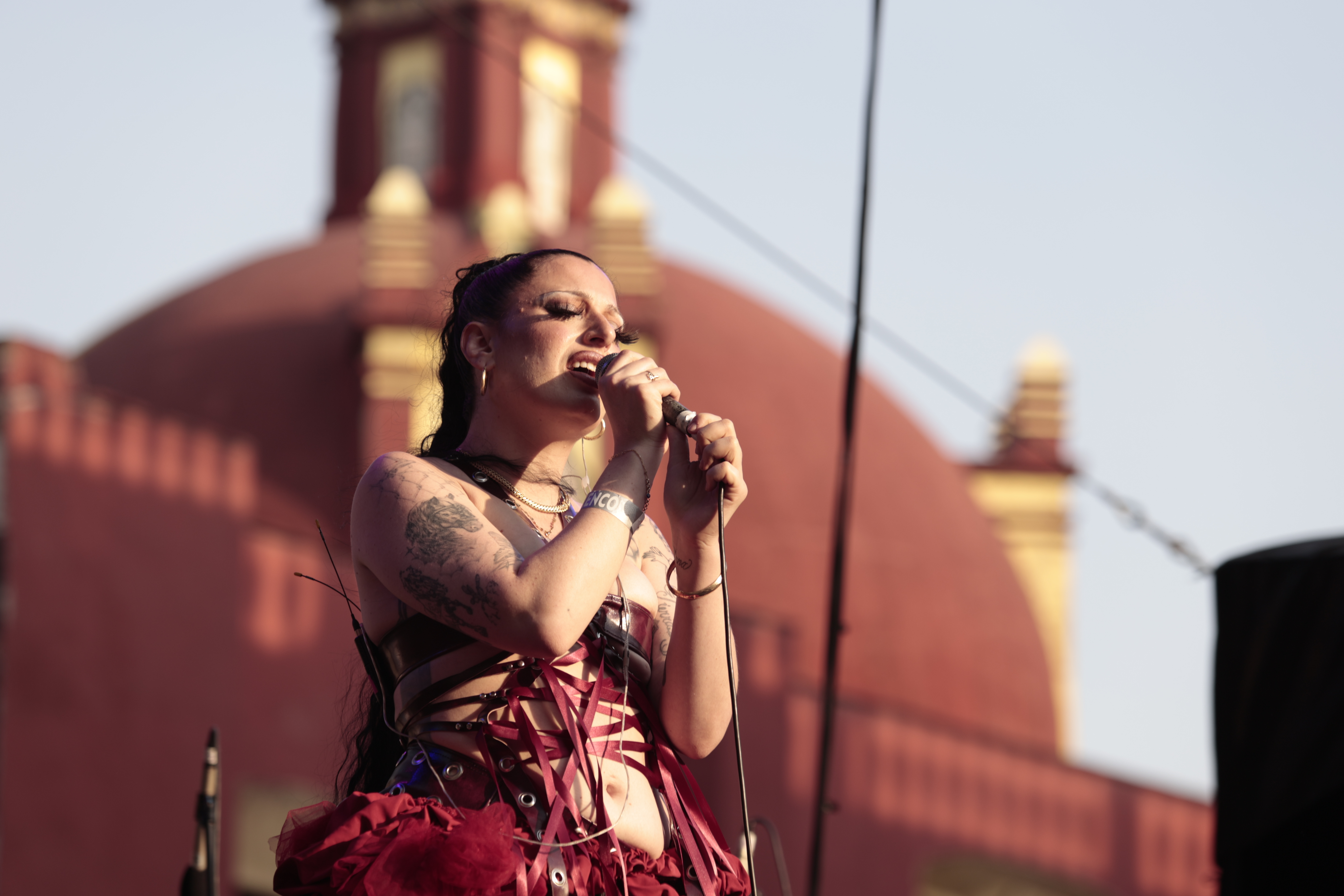
- La Favi in 2024
- Born: Natalia Garcia Pasmanick; December 21, 1990 (age 35); San Francisco, California, U.S.
- Other name: Faviola
- Occupations: Singer; songwriter
- Years active: 2010–present
- Musical career
- Genres: Reggaeton; EDM; neoperreo; R&B; Latin R&B
- Instrument: Vocals
- Labels: Dim Mak; Dim Mak En Fuego

Natalia García Pasmanick (born December 21, 1990), known professionally as La Favi, is an American singer and songwriter. La Favi is known for her bilingual English and Spanish recordings, covering a broad spectrum of Latin and urban music genres, including reggaeton, progressive R&B, neoperreo, flamenco, Latin trap, dembow, adult contemporary, dancehall, and electronic music. Her accolades include a Latin Grammy Award and a Grammy nomination.

La Favi first appeared on the music scene in 2010 as a featured artist on the track ‘'Abrázame'’ with Los Rakas. Her debut EP, Reír & Llorar (2017), along with multiple collaborations with the collective led by Yung Beef and its emerging label, La Vendición Records, established her presence in the Latin alternative scene, receiving recognition from international media outlets such as Rolling Stone, Billboard, The Guardian, The FADER, GQ, and Remezcla. She has since released multiple projects, including Is It Real (2020) and No Es Igual (2023). La Favi signed with Steve Aoki's label Dim Mak En Fuego in 2022, winning a Latin Grammy that same year for her participation in Chiquis Rivera’s album, Abeja Reina.

== Early life ==
Natalia García Pasmanick was born on December 21, 1990, in San Francisco, United States. Raised in a musically-inclined family, her connection to music developed from an early age, further shaped by the multicultural environment of her Glen Park neighborhood, the musical trends of the time, and her Spanish heritage.

During her teenager years, La Favi joined the SF Girls Chorus and participated in local music projects with rapper friends, contributing as a background vocalist and songwriter. She began creating her own music from her bedroom, using a laptop and a notebook to develop her compositions.

== Career ==
=== 2010-2016: Early Career ===
La Favi's initial rise in the music scene began in 2010 with her verse on the single “Abrázame” alongside the Panamanian duo Los Rakas. This marked the beginning of her solo trajectory, which she developed in the following years through the release of acoustic and traditional mixtapes on Bandcamp, including FLOR DE AZAHAR VOL. 1 (2011) and solsticio (2012).

In 2013, she released several urban-oriented projects on YouTube, including covers and original songs. In the summer of 2014, La Favi moved temporarily to Almería, Spain, where she established a key connection with Ms Nina, who introduced her to Yung Beef and the members of PXXR GVNG (now Los Santos). This introduction marked the beginning of her relationship with the emerging label La Vendicion.

Throughout 2015 and 2016, La Favi began releasing her first official works on digital platforms under her stage name. Her debut single, “Cruising with You”, was released on September 15, 2015. She collaborated regularly with members of La Vendicion Records, including Yung Beef on “Happy Hours” and “Lusifel”, PXXR GVNG on “OG’S”, and Ms Nina on “No Eres Bueno”, which was released in late 2016.

=== 2017: Reír & Llorar & La Vendicion Records ===
On March 7, 2017, La Favi released her debut EP Reír & Llorar, in collaboration with Peruvian DJ and producer Deltatron. The project received positive attention from critics and media outlets. The opening track, “Tú y Yo”, was highlighted in several year-end lists, including by NPR, which named it one of their “favorite songs by Latin artists in the alternative scene in 2017,” and by Remezcla, which ranked it second on their list of the 50 best songs of 2017, just behind Cardi B’s “Bodak Yellow”. That same year, Remezcla also named La Favi one of the Best Emerging Latinx Artists, alongside artists such as A. Chal and Tei Shi. Other outlets, including Vice and The FADER, praised her ability to blend elements of her Andalusian roots with contemporary rhythms from the San Francisco Bay Area, identifying her as an artist to watch in the coming years.

During that same year, La Favi also released her first two singles under La Vendicion Records during the SS17: “Crazy” and “Sácame.” She additionally released a remix of “Sirena” from Reír & Llorar, featuring Bea Pelea, as well as the track “Duele” with Ms Nina and Beauty Brain later that year.

=== 2018-2019: Better Off Alone with Soiceytrap ===
La Favi returned to the United States in 2018. She ended the year with the release of the single “Nieves de Enero”, produced by Sueuga Kamau, on December 10.

In 2019, she appeared on “El Consejo” with Ms Nina and “La 40” with Yung Beef. On March 29, she released an EP in collaboration with trap artist Soiceytrap, titled Better Off Alone. For the EP’s instrumentals, La Favi used unlicensed tracks by Chilean DJ and producer Dinamarca, which led to contact between the two artists and eventually prompted her relocation to Stockholm, Sweden, where Dinamarca was based at the time.

Dinamarca later invited La Favi to contribute vocals to the reissue of his EP Sol de Mi Vida, where she added lyrics to the tracks “Dino” and “Jevi”, the latter featuring Ms Nina. This collaboration led to further joint work between the two artists during La Favi’s stay in Sweden.

In late 2019, La Favi was among the first artists announced for the Primavera Sound 2020 lineup in Spain. Around the same time, GQ included her in its list of reggaeton singers transforming the music scene, comparing her to Rosalía.

=== 2020: Is It Real with Dinamarca ===
In early 2020, La Favi was preparing to leave San Francisco and travel to Mexico with Ulises Lozano "El Licenciado" to begin planning and producing her first full-length album. However, these plans were interrupted by the COVID-19 pandemic, which forced her to remain in her hometown.

In late August, Dinamarca announced that he had recorded a seven-track EP with La Favi. The two artists released a maxi-single on September 9, 2020, featuring the songs “Sana Sana” and “By My Side”. “No Contestaste” was released as a promotional single on September 30. Eight days later, the cover art and release date for the collaborative EP were revealed. The project, titled Is It Real, was officially released on October 23.

=== 2021-2022: Dim Mak En Fuego & Latin Grammys ===
In August 2021, the single “Wachu Did” was released through KinKon Records, produced by El Licenciado. However, the track was later removed from streaming platforms, and on October 29, “Fantasma”, also produced by El Licenciado, was released in its place.

In November 2022, it was announced that La Favi had signed with both Dim Mak and its Latin imprint Dim Mak En Fuego, record labels founded by Steve Aoki. Regarding the signing, Aoki commented: “It’s special when you are able to sign an artist like La Favi to Dim Mak En Fuego. As she pushes Latin Alternative and Underground forward, she still is representing a lot of the more traditional Latin culture and sounds from places like LA and the Bay, but able to create a hybrid that the world can vibe to”.

La Favi's first single under Dim Mak, “Action,” was released on November 22, 2022, with production by El Licenciado and Kiid Favelas.

A few weeks later, La Favi won a Latin Grammy for Best Banda Album due her contribution as a songwriter on Chiquis Rivera’s album Abeja Reina. She was also nominated for a Grammy Award for her work on the same album.

On December 9, La Favi released “En Secreto” as a celebration. The song had premiered earlier on November 25 during the Latin Grammys after-party hosted by Steve Aoki at his Las Vegas residency at OMNIA Nightclub.

During this period, Rolling Stone recognized La Favi, alongside artists like Bad Gyal and Bea Pelea, for her role in expanding the influence of neoperreo internationally, referring to her as a “Spanish American neoperreo phenom”.

=== 2023: Para Ti, No Es Igual & 14 Mission ===
In early 2023, La Favi began promoting Qué Hiciste, a five-track EP that marked her first official release under Dim Mak En Fuego. The project included previously released singles from the previous year, along with two new tracks: “Travesura” and a new collaboration with Ms Nina titled “Bebiendo”. The EP was distributed through online stores a few days ahead of its official release.

On February 17, La Favi released Para Ti, a revised version of Qué Hiciste, featuring the same five tracks with one change: the collaboration with Ms Nina was replaced by the EP’s title track, produced by American artist YAWNS. The release served as a prelude to her debut album and was featured in Billboard, which highlighted her “enigmatic allure” and “sad-girl dreamlike lyricism,” as well as noting the production by El Licenciado and her debut under Dim Mak.

On March 31, she released “Esa Fui Yo” as a promotional single off her debut album. On April 28, the track “Bebiendo” with Ms Nina which had been excluded from Para Ti, was released along with a music video. The following day, April 29, La Favi performed during Dinamarca's Boiler Room set in San Francisco.

During an Instagram livestream, La Favi confirmed the title of her debut album, No Es Igual, and announced its release for May. On May 8, she revealed the album’s cover and tracklist, confirming a release date of May 26. Leading up to the release, she shared “Con Mis Gatas” at midnight on May 22 as a surprise preview, followed by “Mil Horas” and “Dártelo” on May 23 and 24, respectively. The final single, “Contigo”, produced by YAWNS, was released alongside its official video and the full album on May 26.

In October 2023, La Favi announced a collaborative EP with producer YAWNS. The project was initially scheduled for release on November 9 but was ultimately released two weeks later, on November 27. The EP included six unreleased tracks that were not part of her debut album but had been performed during her tour and previewed on social media, named after the trolley bus route.

=== 2024-2025: I'm Pretty & Adicta ===
La Favi began 2024 with a collaboration on the single “I Like It,” released on February 10, alongside Manuka Honey and Safety Trance. On March 23, she performed at the Manuel Tolsá Plaza during the Noche de Primavera festival in Mexico City as part of her tour. On August 12, she appeared at the Outside Lands festival in San Francisco, performing on the newly added Casa Bacardí stage.

On October 25, she released her sixth EP, I’m Pretty (stylized in all caps), in collaboration with French producer Rosaliedu38 under KinKon Records. The project featured four tracks, including the singles “Memories,” released alongside the EP, and “Sola en la Ciudad,” released weeks later, both accompanied with music videos.

On April 4, 2025, La Favi released “Fall In Love,” the lead single off her second studio album, in collaboration with producers Louis Brodinski and Modulaw. The second single, “Ashes,” was released on April 26 and produced by the French duo Glass. On May 23, she released “Sticky,” a collaboration with Foudeqush, as the final preview of the album. In an interview with Equal Music, La Favi confirmed the album’s title, Adicta, as well as its release date. The album was released on June 20, 2025, via the Paris-based label Promesses.

== Discography ==
=== Studio albums ===
List of studio albums, with selected details
Títle	Details
No Es Igual	Released: 26 May 2023; Label: Dim Mak En Fuego; Format: Digital download, streaming
Adicta	Released: 20 June 2025; Label: Promesses; Format: Digital download, streaming

=== Extended Plays ===
List of EPs, with selected details
Títle	Details
Reir & Llorar	Released: 7 March 2017; Label: Terror Negro; Format: Digital download, streaming
Better Off Alone (With Soicytrap)	Released: 29 March 2019; Label: Independent; Format: Digital download, streaming
Is It Real (With Dinamarca)	Released: 23 October 2020; Label: STAYCORE; Format: Digital download, streaming
Para Ti	Released: 17 February 2023; Label: Dim Mak En Fuego; Format: Digital download, streaming
14 Mission (With YAWNS)	Released: 27 November 2023; Label: Independent; Format: Digital download, streaming
I'M PRETTY (With Rosaliedu38)	Released: 25 October 2024; Label: KinKon Records; Format: Digital download, streaming

=== Singles ===
==== As lead artist ====
List of singles as lead artist, showing year released and originating album
Títle	Year	Album
''Cruising With You''	2015	Non-album single
''No Eres Bueno'' (With Ms Nina)	2016	Non-album single
''Tú y Yo''	2016	Reír & Llorar - EP
''Sácame''	2017	Non-album single
''Crazy''	2017	Non-album single
''Sirena Remix'' (With Bea Pelea)	2017	Non-album single
''Nieves de Enero''	2018	Non-album single
''By My Side'' (With Dinamarca)	2020	Is It Real - EP
''Sana Sana'' (With Dinamarca)	2020	Is It Real - EP
''No Contestaste'' (With Dinamarca)	2020	Is It Real - EP
''Wachu Did''	2021	Para Ti - EP
''Fantasma''	2021	Non-album single
''Action''	2022	Para Ti - EP
''En Secreto''	2022	Para Ti - EP
''Para Ti'' (With Yawns)	2023	Para Ti - EP
''Esa Fui Yo''	2023	No Es Igual
''Bebiendo'' (With Ms Nina)	2023	No Es Igual
''Contigo'' (With Yawns)	2023	No Es Igual
''14 Mission'' (With Yawns)	2023	14 Mission - EP
''Memories'' (With Rosaliedu38)	2024	I'M PRETTY - EP
''Sola en la Ciudad'' (With Rosaliedu38)	2024	I'M PRETTY - EP
«Fall In Love»	2025	Adicta
''Ashes''	2025	Adicta
''Sticky'' (With Foudeqush)	2025	Adicta

==== As guest artist ====
List of singles as featured artist, showing year released and originating album
Títle	Year	Album
''Abrázame'' (Los Rakas featuring La Favi)	2010	Non-album single
''Lusifel'' (Yung Beef featuring Ms Nina & La Favi)	2015	Perreo de la Muerte
''Acelera'' (Ms Nina featuring La Favi)	2016	Non-album single
''Toda Friki'' (Chico Sonido featuring Ms Nina & La Favi)	2017	Non-album single
''Pastillas'' (Ms Nina featuring La Favi & King Doudou)	2017	Non-album single
''Mentiras'' (Jedet featuring La Favi)	2017	Non-album single
''Duele'' (Ms Nina featuring La Favi & Beauty Brain)	2017	Non-album single
''La Gasolina'' (Bea Pelea featuring La Favi)	2018	Reggaeton Romantico Vol. 1
''MIA'' (El Trinidad featuring La Favi)	2018	Non-album single
''Pinche Amor'' (Amandititita featuring La Favi & El Licenciado)	2019	Pinche Amor
''Dino'' (Dinamarca featuring La Favi)	2019	Sol De Mi Vida: Vocalized
''Jevi'' (Dinamarca featuring La Favi & Ms Nina)	2019	Sol De Mi Vida: Vocalized
''El Consejo'' (Ms Nina featuring La Favi)	2019	Perrando Por Fuera, Llorando Por Dentro
''La 40'' (Yung Beef featuring La Favi)	2019	Perreo de la Muerte 2
''Club Bang'' (Paul Maxwell featuring La Favi)	2021	Non-album single
''Me Perdiste'' (DJ Failure featuring La Favi)	2023	Non-album single
''I Like It'' (Manuka Honey featuring La Favi & Safety Trance)	2024	3Eternities Beneath You - EP

== Awards and Nominees ==
=== Berlin Music Video Awards ===
The Berlin Music Video Awards is an international festival that promotes the art of music videos.

Year	Nominated work	Award	Result	Ref.
2025	"MEMORIES"	Best Director	Nominated	
