= Lizz =

Chilean singer

Elisa Espinoza, also known as Lizz, is a Chilean drum and bass DJ and MC, as well as a singer, songwriter and producer. Her music is characterized by mixing sounds from the Latin underground with influences from trap, reggaeton, and electronic music. She is a co-founder of the neoperreo subgenre.

== Biography ==
Elisa Espinoza grew up in Hualpén. At the age of 17, she traveled to Oxford in the United Kingdom, where she studied English Language and Literature at Oxford Brookes University. Upon returning to Chile, she studied Art History with a minor in Aesthetics at the University of Chile.

She began DJing in 2012, mixing reggaeton and trap under the pseudonym Lizz. Her first stages were parties like Perreo Intenz and Hotmess in Santiago de Chile, in which she presented a visual proposal inspired by neighborhood life, the internet and art.

In 2016, she published her first EP titled Imperio Vol. 1, mixing her Latin roots with black music, followed by singles and collaborations with artists such as Tomasa del Real, Akatumamy, Albany, Ceaese, Panda Bear and Slow Body.

In 2017, the remix of her song "Chacal" was part of the official soundtrack of the Netflix series Elite.

In 2021, she released the single "La Puteria", in collaboration with the Chilean singer Tomasa del Real.

Lizz has played at the festivals Lollapalooza, Primavera Sound, Ultra Festival, Creamfields, EDC MEX, and Cabuland. She is currently a resident of the European radio station Rinse FM.

== Discography ==
Albums

• 2023: EXTASIS SILICONE

• 2026: PERRAS CORE

=== EPs ===
- 2016: Imperio, Vol. 1
- 2017: Chacal (Remix)
- 2022: NALGOTHIC

=== Singles ===
- 2017: "Fin de Semana" (feat. Ceaese)
- 2017: "Perdón" (feat. Slim Dee)
- 2017: "Mercurio Lento"
- 2019: "Embalao"
- 2020: "A Lo Loko"
- 2020: "Sexi Movimiento"
- 2020: "Papi Dame Lo Que Quiero"
- 2020: "Esa Niña Quiere" (feat. Don Elektron and Jamez Manuel)
- 2020: "Te Gusta el Perreo?" (feat. Tomasa del Real, DJ Sustancia and TECH GRL)
- 2021: "Culo"
- 2021: "La Puteria" (feat. Tomasa del Real)
- 2021: "Tengo Que Olvidarte"
- 2022: "Sorry"
- 2022: "Click Clack" (feat. Akatumamy)
- 2022: "Pal Pary" (feat. Albany y Zevra)
- 2022: "Pal Pary" (with Vicenta)
- 2023: "AMIGA" (with Tomasa del Real)
- 2023: "SORRY" (Remix) (with KUINA & Loyaltty)
- 2024: "GTA"
- 2024: "AMOR MALDITO" (with JEDET)
- 2024: "CHAU BEBE" (with BEA PELEA & Pipo Beatz)
- 2025: "Mambo Pa Las Gatas" (with Ms Nina)
- 2025: "LA CHISMOTEKA" (with Tomasa del Real, Sugaarrbbaby & Main Costa)
- 2026: "ROMANCE 3AM" (with Sugaarrbbaby & Cachorra)
