= La Goony Chonga =

American rapper

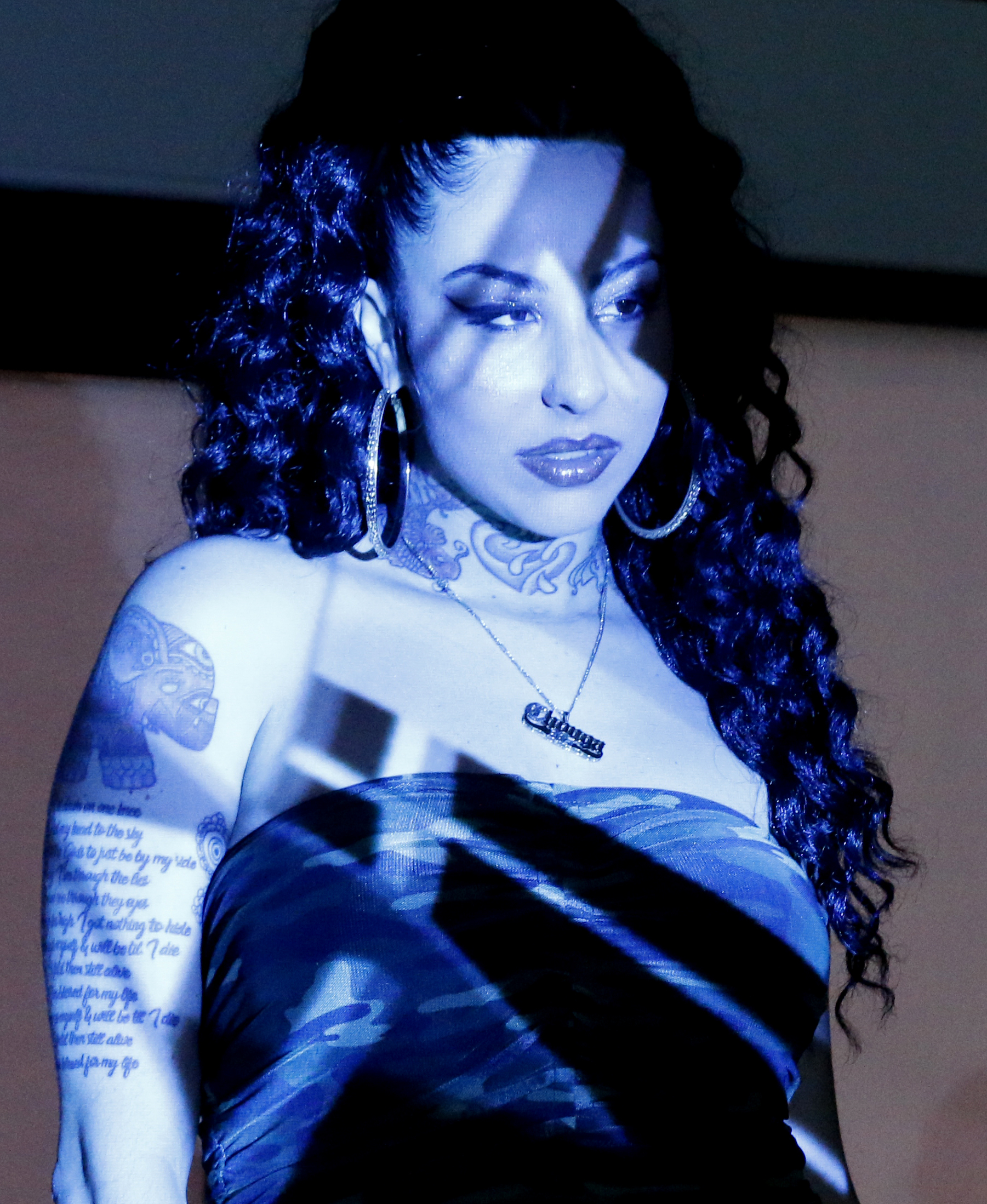
- La Goony Chonga in 2018

Background information
- Also known as: Twiggy Rasta Masta, Bankroll Chonga
- Born: Kasey Rose Avalos; March 19, 1992 (age 34); Miami, Florida, U.S.
- Genres: Reggaeton; trap; neoperreo; hip-hop
- Occupations: Rapper; singer
- Instrument: Vocals
- Years active: 2012–present
- Children: 2

Kasey Rose Avalos (born March 19, 1992), known professionally as La Goony Chonga, is an American rapper and singer. While in college, she posted videos of her freestyling on YouTube and began recording music. She released her first two studio albums, Santeria Pussy (2013) and Santeria Pussy 2 (2015), after dropping out of school. After working as a stripper for three years in Miami, she moved to Los Angeles to record and release her first Spanish-language album, Dinero (2018), followed by her first full-length album, Dimen5ión (2019). Her EP Descontrol was released in 2021.

== Life and career ==
Kasey Avalos was born on March 19, 1992 in Miami, Florida, and is Cuban-American. Her first language is Spanish. As a child, La Goony Chonga wrote poems and songs with her friends at school in a slam book. In 2012, while in college for advertising, La Goony Chonga began posting freestyles to YouTube under the name Twiggy Rasta Masta, her Tumblr username at the time. She also began recording songs in her home, and also released a video for her first song, "I Don't Play with Fuckboys", in 2012. Motivated by comments accusing her of lying about freestyling, she soon dropped out of college to pursue music full-time, and, in 2013, briefly moved from Miami to Los Angeles, where she performed live for the first time at the Ham on Everything party.

La Goony Chonga released her debut studio album, Santeria Pussy, in 2013, followed by her second studio album Santeria Pussy 2, in 2015. She worked as a stripper from 2014 until 2017, when she became pregnant. In 2016, she changed her stage name to La Goony Chonga, inspired by her own song "Goony Chonga Barbie", and started primarily making Latin trap music. She identifies as a chonga, a subculture of women that she has described as "a lifestyle and a reminder of who I am and where I come from" and as an aesthetic defined by hoop earrings, lip liner, nameplates, and Chinese slippers.

La Goony Chonga released her debut EP, Free Bankroll Chonga, in 2018. After moving to Los Angeles, La Goony Chonga got in contact with producers Freak City, with whom she made her third studio album and first Spanish-language album, Dinero, a trap and reggaeton record. The album's release was postponed for a year due to her pregnancy and it was released in September 2018. Her first full-length album, Dimen5ión, was released in 2019. In October 2019, she was featured on the song "Encore" from Brooke Candy's album Sexorcism. During the COVID-19 pandemic, she started a YouTube series, Chongafied, in which she turned friends into chongas. In December 2020, she made a cameo in Brooke Candy's music video for her song "Cum". On July 29, 2021, she released the experimental reggaeton EP, Descontrol, the title of which was inspired by two songs by Nicky Jam and Daddy Yankee both titled "Descontrol". NPR's Alt.Latino named the EP's title track one of the best songs of 2021.

La Goony Chonga performed as a supporting act on Pabllo Vittar's 2022 tour.

== Musical style ==
La Goony Chonga raps in both English and in Spanish. Her music has been described as neoperreo, Latin trap, hip hop, and reggaeton. She is inspired by Madonna, citing her controversial attitude and freestyle music as influential for her. She is also heavily influenced by Ivy Queen, stating, "When you think of reggaeton artists–women–you think of her." Other influences for La Goony Chonga include Jennifer Lopez, Trina, Selena, Pitbull, and Celia Cruz. Mexican singer Sailorfag has called La Goony Chonga an inspiration.

== Personal life ==
La Goony Chonga's son, Mazi, was born in 2018. She gave birth to her second child, a daughter, in 2025.

== Discography ==
=== Studio albums ===
List of studio albums with selected details
Title	Details
Santeria Pussy	Released: June 19, 2013; Label: Self-released; Format: CD, digital download, streaming
Santeria Pussy 2	Released: October 24, 2015; Label: Self-released; Format: CD, digital download, streaming
Dinero	Released: September 11, 2018; Label: Self-released; Format: Digital download, streaming
Dimen5ión	Released: November 15, 2019; Label: Self-released; Format: Digital download, streaming
La Hora de Perrear	Released: March 3, 2023; Label: Self-released; Format: Digital Download, streaming
Goonyverso	Released: November 11, 2023; Label: Self-released; Format: Digital Download, streaming

=== Extended plays ===
List of extended plays with selected details
Title	Details
Free Bankroll Chonga	Released: June 16, 2018; Label: Self-released; Format: Digital download, streaming
Descontrol	Released: July 29, 2021; Label: Self-released; Format: Digital download, streaming

=== Singles ===
==== As lead artist ====
List of singles as lead artist, showing year released and album title
Title	Year	Album
"I Don't Really Think So"	2016	Non-album single
"Tengo Dinero" (featuring Trap Sade)	2016	Non-album single
"Money I Get"	2016	Non-album single
"Cash on Me"	2016	Non-album single
"Spendin'"	2016	Non-album single
"Fast Money"	2016	Non-album single
"Buena y Guapa"	2016	Non-album single
"Yo Se"	2016	Non-album single
"La Puteria"	2016	Non-album single
"La Chismoteka" (featuring La Zowi)	2017	Non-album single
"Tira Tira" (featuring Sickboyrari)	2017	Non-album single
"Krazy Gloo"	2017	Non-album single
"Joya de Oro" (featuring Trap Sade)	2017	Non-album single
"Wish U Would"	2018	Non-album single
"No Effort" (Remix)	2018	Non-album single
"Hasta Luego"	2018	Non-album single
"Poder"	2018	Non-album single
"Be Me"	2018	Non-album single
"No Me Digas"	2018	Non-album single
"Trust No Bitch" (featuring Nikki Neal)	2018	Non-album single
"Kuccifrito" (featuring Bea Pelea)	2019	Non-album single
"No Quieres Lío"	2019	Dimen5ión
"Fiera"	2019	Non-album single
"Duro 2005"	2019	Dimen5ión
"In My Zone"	2020	Non-album single
"Nadie Mas"	2020	Non-album single
"Chongafied Theme Song"	2020	Non-album single
"Woah"	2020	Non-album single
"Mirame"	2021	Descontrol
"Control"	2021	Non-album single
"Thangin" (featuring Gangsta Boo)	2021	Non-album single
"No Quieres Lío 2"	2021	Non-album single
"Take It Easy" (with Nick Garcia)	2022	Non-album single
"Chongivity Activity"	2022	Non-album single
"La Pachanga"	2022	La Hora de Perrear
"Abanico"	2022	La Hora de Perrear
"Jodedera"	2023	Non-album singles
"Diskotech" (with Maxine Ashley)	2023	Non-album singles
"Tu Fantasy" (with Alexis Jae)	2023	Non-album singles

==== As featured artist ====
List of singles as featured artist, showing year released and album title
Title	Year	Album
"Pussy Poppin" (La Zowi featuring La Goony Chonga)	2019	Non-album single
"Latina" (Isabella Lovestory featuring La Goony Chonga)	2023	Non-album single
