= Tomasa del Real =

Chilean Singer and reggaetón artist

Tomasa Del Real
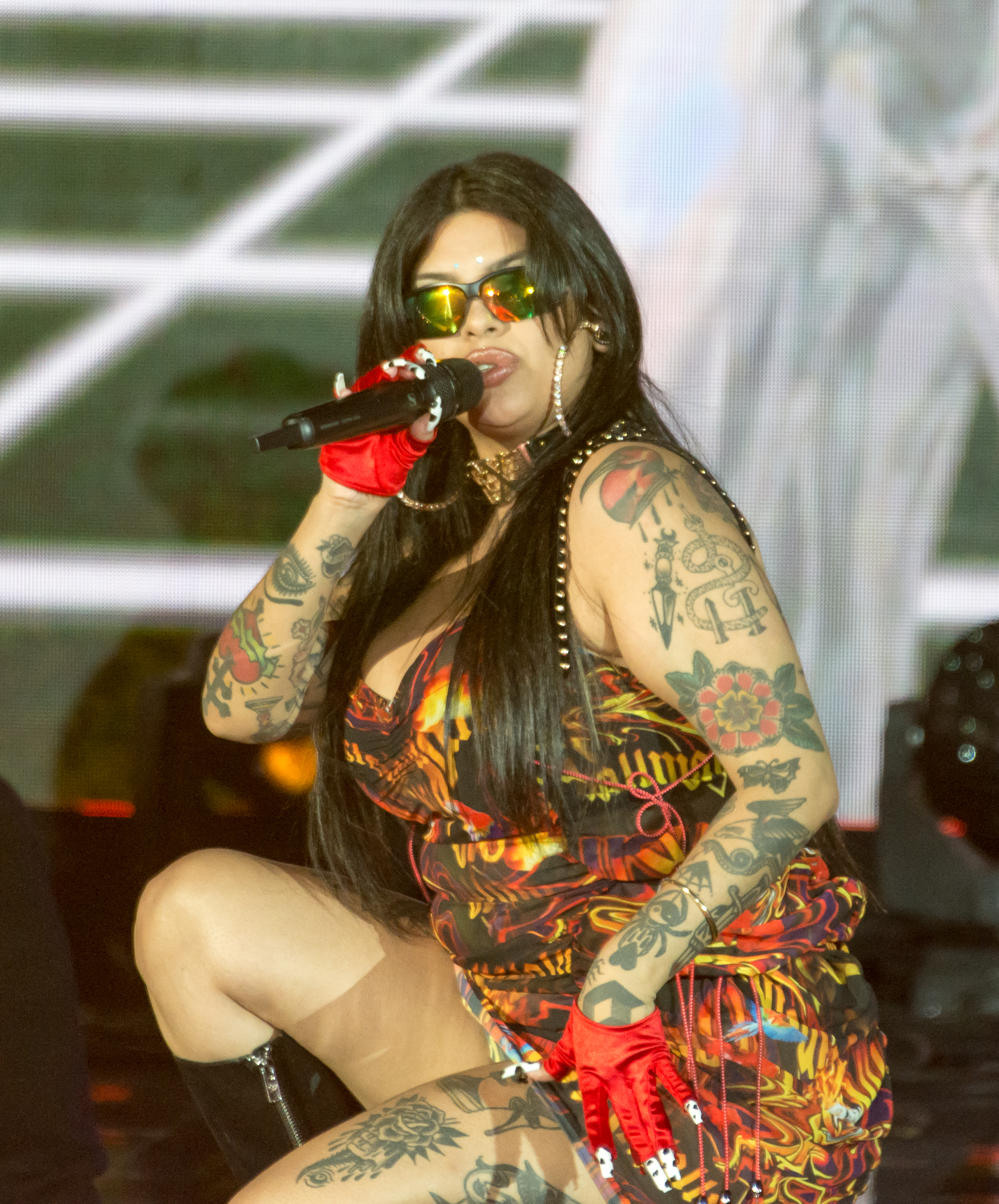

Background information
- Born: Valeria Cisternas; 1 December 1986 (age 39); Iquique, Chile
- Genres: Neoperreo, hip hop
- Years active: 2015–present
- Label: Nacional Records

Valeria Cisternas (born 1 December 1986), better known by her stage name Tomasa Del Real, is a Chilean singer, songwriter, and reggaetón artist. She is regarded as a pioneer of neoperreo, a social-media-inspired offshoot of reggaetón, and is referred to as "La Reina del Neoperreo", Spanish for "the Queen of Neoperreo".

== Early life ==
Tomasa was born in Iquique, Chile on December 1, 1986 in an upper-class family. She studied design in Santiago, Chile. Kids at school used to tease her by calling her Tomasa, but she eventually took the name because it sounded androgynous. She said that she feels like "a man but very much a woman".

== Musical career ==
During her time working in Iquique as a tattoo artist, Tomasa's mother bought her a laptop. Valeria would record herself singing and rapping on the Photo Booth application and then upload those videos to Facebook and YouTube During this time, she would tour around the whole world giving tattoos to people and on these tours she would begin performing reggaetón at DIY parties. As her customers worldwide learned about her love for reggaetón they would invite her to record songs in their home studios.

In 2015, due to growing success and demand as a performer, Del Real closed her tattoo shop as she no longer had the time to keep it running.

Del Real released her first album Bien y Mal in March 2016. Many of her oldest songs were included in this album leading critics to note that, despite its DIY spirit, many songs have become some of the best examples for the genre. Del Real has subsequently released two other albums. One on May 18, 2018, titled Bellaca del Año via Nacional Records. and the other on May 31, 2019, titled TDR.

In 2021, she released the single titled La Puteria, in collaboration with the Chilean singer Lizz.

Tomasa is a self-described "reggaetón nerd" and researches the genre daily.

== Discography ==
Albums

- Bien y Mal (2016)
- Bellaca del Año (2018)
- TDR (2019)

== Singles ==
- "Bellaca del Año" (2018)
