= Maybe It's True What They Say About Us =

- Theatrical release poster
- Directed by: Camilo Becerra; Sofía Paloma Gómez
- Written by: Camilo Becerra; Sofía Paloma Gómez
- Produced by: Carlos Núñez; Gabriela Sandoval
- Starring: Aline Kuppenheim; Camila Milenka; Julia Lübbert
- Cinematography: Manuel Rebella
- Edited by: Valeria Racioppi
- Music by: Pablo Mondragón
- Production companies: Baremo Films; HD Argentina; Murillo Cine; Storyboard Media
- Distributed by: Storyboard Media (Chile); Amazon Prime Video (Worldwide)
- Release dates: May 30, 2024 (Chile); June 7, 2024 (Prime Video)
- Running time: 95 minutes
- Countries: Chile; Argentina; Spain
- Language: Spanish

Maybe It's True What They Say About Us (Spanish: Quizás es cierto lo que dicen de nosotras) is a 2024 thriller drama film written and directed by Camilo Becerra and Sofía Paloma Gómez. An international co-production between Chile, Argentina and Spain, the film stars Aline Kuppenheim, Camila Milenka and Julia Lübbert.

== Synopsis ==
Ximena, a successful psychiatrist, receives an unexpected visit from her eldest daughter, Tamara, whom she hasn't seen for a long time. Her stay in a spiritual community has alienated and completely changed her. While Tamara takes refuge in her mother's house, an investigation is launched because Tamara's newborn son disappeared under strange circumstances within the sect to which she belongs. Both the justice system and Ximena will try to discover the fate of the missing baby.

== Cast ==
- Aline Kuppenheim
- Camila Milenka
- Julia Lübbert
- Alessandra Guerzoni
- María Paz Collarte

== Production ==
Principal photography wrapped in mid-May 2023 in Santiago, Pirque, and Laguna Verde.

== Release ==
The film had a limited theatrical release in Chile on May 30, 2024, followed by a worldwide release on June 7, 2024, on Amazon Prime Video. It was subsequently screened on September 26, 2024, at the 72nd San Sebastián International Film Festival, and on January 28, 2025, at the 48th Gothenburg Film Festival.

== Accolades ==
Award	Ceremony date	Category	Recipient(s)	Result	Ref.
San Sebastián International Film Festival	28 September 2024	Horizontes Latinos Award	Maybe It's True What They Say About Us	Nominated	
Caleuche Awards	30 January 2025	Best Leading Actress	Aline Kuppenheim	Nominated	
Caleuche Awards	30 January 2025	Best Supporting Actress	Camila Milenka	Nominated	
Gothenburg Film Festival	2 February 2025	Best International Film	Maybe It's True What They Say About Us	Nominated	
