= 42 Days of Darkness =

Chilean television series

- Also known as: 42 Days in the Dark
- Spanish: 42 días en la oscuridad
- Genre: Crime thriller
- Starring: Claudia Di Girólamo; Néstor Cantillana; Amparo Noguera; Alejandro Goic; Julia Lübbert; Aline Küppenheim; Eduardo Paxeco
- Country of origin: Chile
- Original language: Spanish
- No. of seasons: 1
- No. of episodes: 6

Production
- Running time: 40–59 mins
- Production companies: Fabula production company; Netflix

Original release
- Network: Netflix
- Release: 11 May 2022 – present

42 Days of Darkness (Spanish: 42 días en la oscuridad, lit. '42 Days in the Dark') is a six-part Chilean crime thriller television series that premiered on Netflix on May 11, 2022. Directed by Gaspar Antillo and Claudia Huaiquimilla, the series is partially based on the true story of the disappearance of Viviana Haeger in 2010, which is depicted by Aline Küppenheim, and on the search for answers undertaken by her sister Cecilia, played by Claudia Di Girolamo.

== Background ==
The series is based on the disappearance of Viviana Haeger on June 29, 2010, in Puerto Varas, Chile, but it takes some liberties with the actual events. Haeger, a mother of two daughters, was married at the time to Jaime Anguita. When her body was found in the attic of her Puerto Varas home on August 10, 2010, it was first thought to be suicide, and then murder. Her husband was charged, along with an accomplice, but the husband was ultimately acquitted due to a lack of evidence. The accomplice was sentenced to ten years in prison. Rodrigo Fluxá, who authored a book titled Usted sabe quién: notas sobre el homicidio de Viviana Haeger about the investigation and trial, also collaborated on the series.

== Plot ==
On the morning of June 29, 2010, Verónica Montes (Aline Küppenheim) disappeared from her home in the Altos del Lago condominium, an exclusive area of Puerto Varas in southern Chile. The first clues are puzzling: the car keys were left in place, the most valuable objects in the house are untouched, and there are no signs of a possible robbery.

Mario Medina (Daniel Alcaíno), her husband and father of their two daughters, Karen (Julia Lübbert) and Emilia (Monserrat Lira), says that on that day, while he was out running an errand, he received a call asking for money in exchange for his wife's release.

The head of the search is Cecilia Montes (Claudia Di Girolamo), who tirelessly seeks her sister Verónica, who disappeared from her home without a trace. In this mission, she is accompanied by her lawyer Víctor Pizarro (Pablo Macaya), and together they will have to face the indifference of institutions, the many prejudices of society, and the harassment of the press.

== Cast and characters ==
=== Main characters ===
- Claudia Di Girolamo as Cecilia Montes
- Pablo Macaya as Víctor Pizarro
- Daniel Alcaíno as Mario Medina
- Aline Küppenheim as Verónica Montes
- Gloria Münchmeyer as Berta Montes
- Julia Lübbert as Karen Medina
- Monserrat Lira as Emilia Medina
- Amparo Noguera as Nora Figueroa
- Néstor Cantillana as Braulio Sanchez
- Claudio Arredondo as Manuel Toledo
- Daniela Pino as Paula Asenjo
- Iván Cáceres as Joaquín Pizarro

=== Recurring cast ===
- Daniel Muñoz as Arturo Fernandez
- Tamara Acosta as Carmen Salazar
- Willy Semler as Cristian Lira
- Alejandro Goic as Regional Fiscal
- Eduardo Paxeco as Gustavo López
- Paola Giannini as Monica Jimenez
- Claudia Cabezas as Manuela Roa
- Nelson Polanco as Ricardo Montes
- Andrés Suknic as Adolfo Varas
- Rodolfo Pulgar como Mayor of the Region of La Araucanía
- Jaime Azócar como Southern District Police Chief
- Hernán Lacalle como Inzunza
- Elvis Fuentes como Nelson
- Roque Artiagoitía as Karen Friend's
- Constanza Rojas as Karen Friend's
- Juan Carlos Maldonado as Silva

== Episodes ==
No.	Title	Directed by	Written by	Original release date
1	"These Things Don't Happen Here" (Spanish: Esas cosas no pasan acá)	Gaspar Antillo & Claudia Huaiquimilla	Rodrigo Fluxá & Claudia Huaiquimilla	May 11, 2022
2	"If You Vanished, What Would They Say About You?" (Spanish: Qué dirían de ti si desapareces?)	Gaspar Antillo & Claudia Huaiquimilla	Rodrigo Fluxá & Claudia Huaiquimilla	May 11, 2022
3	"The House Across the Street" (Spanish: La casa del frente)	Gaspar Antillo	Rodrigo Fluxá & Claudia Huaiquimilla	May 11, 2022
4	"Day 42" (Spanish: Dia 42)	Gaspar Antillo & Claudia Huaiquimilla	Rodrigo Fluxá & Claudia Huaiquimilla	May 11, 2022
5	"I Don't Believe What They Say" (Spanish: No creo lo que dicen)	Gaspar Antillo & Claudia Huaiquimilla	Rodrigo Fluxá & Claudia Huaiquimilla	May 11, 2022
6	"Still In the Dark" (Spanish: Cada vez más a oscuras)	Claudia Huaiquimilla	Rodrigo Fluxá & Claudia Huaiquimilla	May 11, 2022

== Filming locations ==
This series was filmed in Santiago, Villarrica, Pucón, and Puerto Montt in Chile.
