= Chonga =

Term for an expressive and sexually liberated woman

Chonga is a Spanish-derived term used especially in South Florida, often to indicate a working-class, sexually liberated, very sassy, and emotionally expressive young woman.

Chongas are also a distinct subculture, believed to have developed in Miami in the late 20th century. Members are typically young, working-class Hispanic women. In South Florida the term is usually considered a pejorative, though some young women are proud to identify themselves as such. While feminist scholarship on chongas is limited, early work by gender studies scholar Jillian Hernandez has suggested that the chonga identity is an "emerging icon", and that it can be empowering for working-class women.

== Etymology and meaning ==
The intended meaning of the term "chonga" varies depending on the context in which it is used. The most specific meaning of the term denotes a member of the chonga subculture—young, usually working class and Latina women—who dress and often act in a sexualized, brash, sometimes aggressive manner. The term also has three looser meanings: as a synonym for prostitute; to refer to a woman who acts "gangsta" or in a thug like manner; and among female friends, as a jovial way to greet each other, as an alternative to "girlfriend!"

Usage of the term to refer to young women is believed to have arisen in Miami, and only became prominent in the early 21st century. The same word has long been used in Latin American countries such as Peru and Ecuador to refer to a brothel; the modern US usage of the word may be related to this, or might have arisen independently among Floridian Cuban-Americans.

"Chonga" has lexical similarities with several other Spanish terms, some of which have been in use for centuries. These include:

- chola – used in the Southwestern United States for women of Mexican or Mexican-American descent, sometimes with the added meaning that they are a "homegirl" or someone from the streets.
- chula – which denotes a cute or sexy young woman, whereas chulo is the male equivalent.

== Chonga subculture ==
Over the years the style evolved, with for instance tight jeans becoming more popular than shorts. Chongas may express loud, emotionally expressive and aggressive behavior. Not all chongas live up to these stereotypes; for example, sometimes women whose conduct is the most overtly sexualized will in fact be among the least interested in actual heterosexual encounters—in some cases chonga behavior is perhaps best understood as a kind of bonding between female friends.

=== Depictions in the media ===
Until 2007, chongas have rarely appeared in the media, despite their high visibility in real life. One of the rare exceptions was the Cheerleaders (2000) set of art photographs by Luis Gispert. In popular culture, the few exceptions include Bratz dolls which have a chonga-like appearance; the chonga-like characters Lydia and Melina in the television comedy MADtv; and the chonga-like character Tina in the movie Do the Right Thing. Hernandez noted that the only depiction she's aware of that accurately showed chongas in their social context was the 2007 "Bratz girls" exhibition by the GisMo Collective (Jessica Gispert and Crystal Molinary). Since 2012, reggaeton and trap artist La Goony Chonga has drawn added attention to the subculture by openly and proudly identifying as a chonga.

=== In cultural and gender studies ===
Hernandez argues the chonga image has become iconic in Miami, and states that the aesthetic appeal of the chonga can be considerable, which in her opinion partly explains why the cheerleaders set of photographs was successful in launching Gispert's international career. Since 2012, reggaeton and trap artist La Goony Chonga has drawn added attention to the subculture by openly and proudly identifying as a chonga.

The portrayal of chongas in the media can, however, be problematic, sometimes even repressive, as powerful negative images contribute to Latinas internalizing pressure to conform which originates from the dominant Anglo-American culture. Stereotypical representations of chongas can play a role in the United States' wider culture wars, adding to concerns about the sexuality of some Latina women being "out of control" with their perceived high rate of reproduction. Citing earlier work by Isabel Molina Guzmán, Hernandez relates this to the Elián González affair, where the media portrayal of Marisleysis González as having the chonga-like characteristic of emotional excess contributed to the degradation of the privileged, "model minority status" that Cuban Americans had previously enjoyed.

The creators of "Chongalicious", who are themselves middle class, found they had considerably more male attention while pretending to be chongas, one of them saying back in 2007 that "I think we would have boyfriends if we were real chongas." Hernandez suggests that the chonga sub culture is in several ways a positive thing, representing women who are not shamed into invisibility by their low-class status or ethnic identity. She anticipates a broadening and deepening of feminist scholarship on chongas, to uncover the ways in which the chonga identity can be helpful to young women exploring their "bodies and pleasures".

== See also ==
- Chicano Movement
- Ghetto fabulous
- List of subcultures
