= La Zowi =

Spanish singer (born 1993)

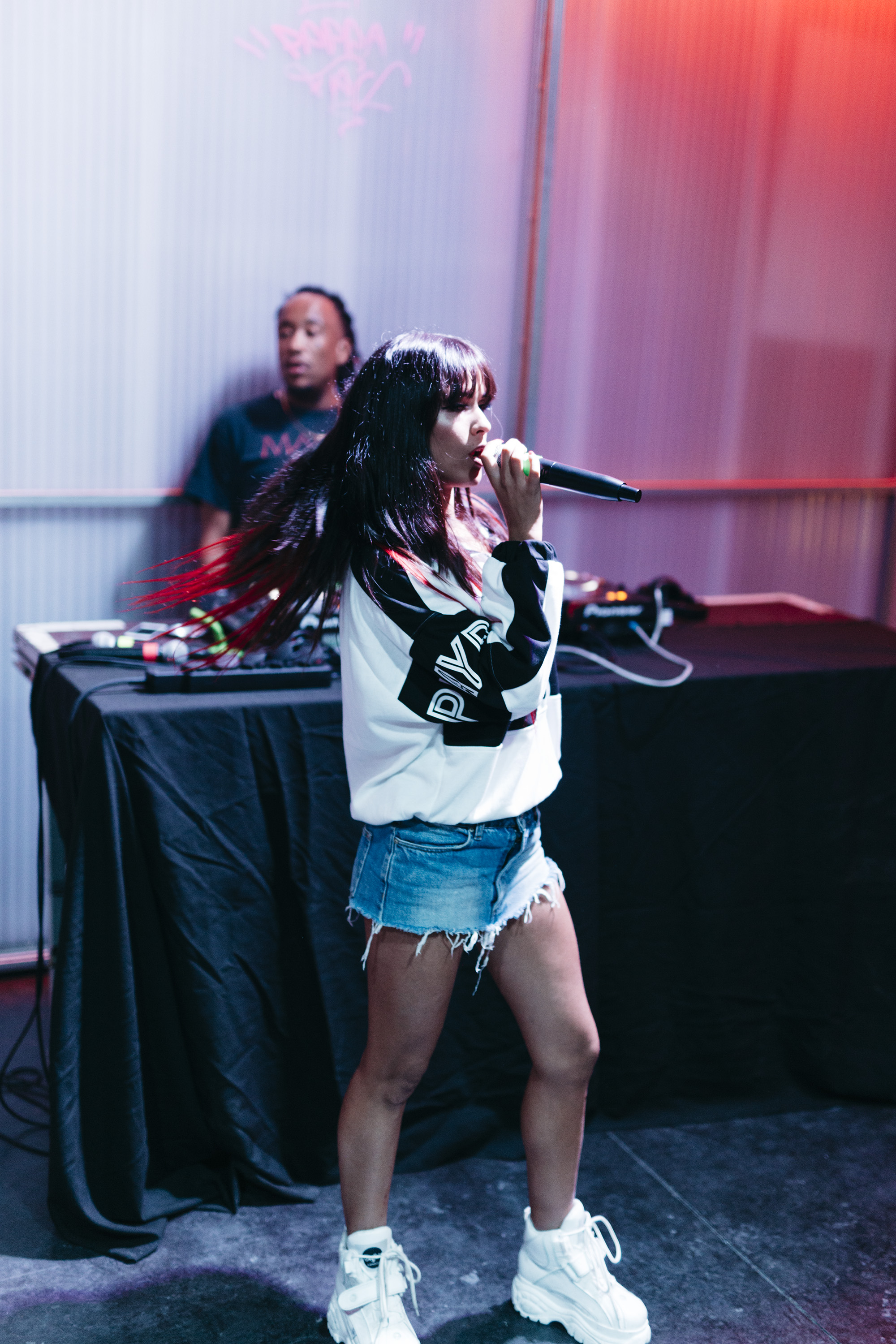
- La Zowi performing in 2018

Background information
- Born: Zoe Jeanneau Canto; 10 April 1993 (age 33); Paris, France
- Origin: Granada, Spain
- Genres: Spanish trap; reggaeton
- Occupations: Singer; songwriter; actress
- Years active: 2013–present

Zoe Jeanneau Canto (born 10 April 1993), also known as La Zowi, is a Spanish Latin trap musician.

== Early life ==
La Zowi was born in Paris, France and raised in Granada, Spain, and has lived in other European cities such as Marseille, Jaén, London, Barcelona and Madrid, where she currently resides. Her mother is a feminist poet and her father, Patrice Jean Marcel Jeanneau, is a flamenco guitarist known as El Yerbita. She grew up listening to flamenco, which, according to her, "has been my environment and my way of life. Latin and African music have also become the basis of my references."

== Career ==
She began her musical career creating music with friends, among whom were the members of Pxxr Gvng. She speaks mainly of social issues associated to trap music, such as drugs, money and putas (whores in Spanish). In several interviews she has expressed that she does not like her own voice. In her lyrics, social constructs such as money, putas, drugs and her "goonies" are repeated throughout her songs. Her most common catchphrase is "La Zowi Puta".

She released her first track "Raxeta" in 2013 through YouTube. The word "raxeta" is a loanword re-appropriation of the English word "ratchet", a term from Louisianan African American Vernacular English, which denotes any combination of trashiness, a working-class sensibility, and authenticity (especially of the Black American experience). "For me, a ratchet is someone like me, a humble neighborhood girl who wears cheap clothes and imitations of luxury brands, and does it provocatively." She has collaborated with almost every artist associated with La Vendicion Records, such as Bea Pelea and La Goony Chonga, and has worked recurrently with producers Zora Jones and Mark Luva.

On November 22 she released her first mixtape, titled "Ama de casa", published through the same label. The mixtape has vocal features from Albany, Flynt Hustle and GOA, as well as the producers DP Beats, Steve Lean, Barla, Oddlaw or Tweak.

La Zowi, together with Alizzz, were also in charge of introducing the second season of the musical show El Bloque TV, which is broadcast on YouTube.

In one of her interviews with WAG1 Magazine in 2016, La Zowi defined what trap was for her, a movement that gone viral during that year. According to what the artist commented, trap is "money and drugs" but also a way for women to empower.

In 2020, she released her debut album called "Elite" and goes back to the talk show La Resistencia to present it. It is a 9-song album which mixes her distinctive concepts with experimental electronic sounds. Zora Jones, Pablo Chill-E and Paul Marmota are some artists that have collaborations in Elite.

She debuted as an actress in the Spanish TV series Cristina La Veneno, created by Los Javis (Javier Ambrossi and Javier Calvo), playing the role of Sonia Monroy, a famous Spanish television character.

In 2022, she was a guest judge on season 2 of Drag Race España.

== Personal life ==
She has a child named Romeo with Spanish rapper Yung Beef.

== Discography ==
=== Mixtapes ===
- Ama de casa (2018)
- Élite (2020)
- La reina del Sur (2023)

=== Extended plays ===
- Pussy Taste (2024)

=== Singles ===
==== As lead artist ====
- Ratxeta (2013)
- Oye papi (2016)
- Mi chulo (2016)
- Obra de arte (2016)
- Random hoe (2016)
- La chismoteka (2017)
- Money hoe (2017)
- High (2017)
- Tu y yo (2017)
- Bitch te quemas (2017)
- Llámame (2018)
- B*tch mode (2018)
- No lo ves (2018)
- Empezar de cero (2019)
- Boss (2019)
- Filet mignon (2020)
- Full time (2020)
- Sugar mami (2020)
- Indecente (2020)
- Nada (2020)
- Sin modales (2021)
- Matrix (2021)
- Tutoto (2021)
- Terapia de choque (2022)
- Ping pong (2022)
- Bitch feka (2023)
- La 9 (2023)
- Chill (2023)
- Ya fue (2023)
- DURO (2024)
- ORGASM (2024)

==== As featured artist ====
- "Demonic" (Single by Namasenda)
- "Revolea" (Single by Ms Nina, TAICHU, Ebhoni)
- "Smartphone" (Single by Soto Asa)
- "YO TENGO UN NOVIO" (Single by Lola Índigo)
- "MollyPop" (Single by Jok'air)
- Dolce & Gabbana ( Single by Gallagher)
