= Dreaming of Julia =

- Dreaming of Julia film poster
- Directed by: Juan Gerard
- Written by: Letvia Arza-Goderich; Juan Gerard
- Produced by: Harvey Keitel; Letvia Arza-Goderich; Andrew Pfeffer; Bonnie Timmermann
- Starring: Gael García Bernal; Harvey Keitel
- Cinematography: Kramer Morgenthau
- Distributed by: Inferno Distribution
- Release date: October 24, 2003
- Running time: 109 min.
- Country: Dominican Republic
- Language: English
- Budget: $108,564,927

Dreaming of Julia (Cuba Libre) is a 2003 film directed by Juan Gerard. The debut film by the director, the story is based on Gerard's childhood life in Cuba. The film was released as Cuban Blood in the US. This film was initially released on 27 January 2006 in Mexico.

== Plot ==
Set in Cuba in 1958, the last year of Fulgencio Batista regime, the plot revolves around a boy who is torn between his friendship with a blonde American named Julia and the strife facing his family as a result of the revolution and turmoil in their nation.

== Cast ==
- Harvey Keitel as "Che"
- Iben Hjejle as Julia
- Andhy Méndez as Boy
- Diana Bracho as Beta
- Gael García Bernal as Ricky
- Aline Küppenheim as Katia
- Cecilia Suárez as Dulce
- Héctor Then as Captain Rosado's Bodyguard 1
- Ramses Cairo as Captain Rosado's Bodyguard 2
- Marilyn Romero as Tia Candita
- Gyana Mella as The Hooker

== Production ==
The movie was entirely filmed in the Dominican Republic, in 2000.
