= Isabella Lovestory =

Honduran singer (born 1993)

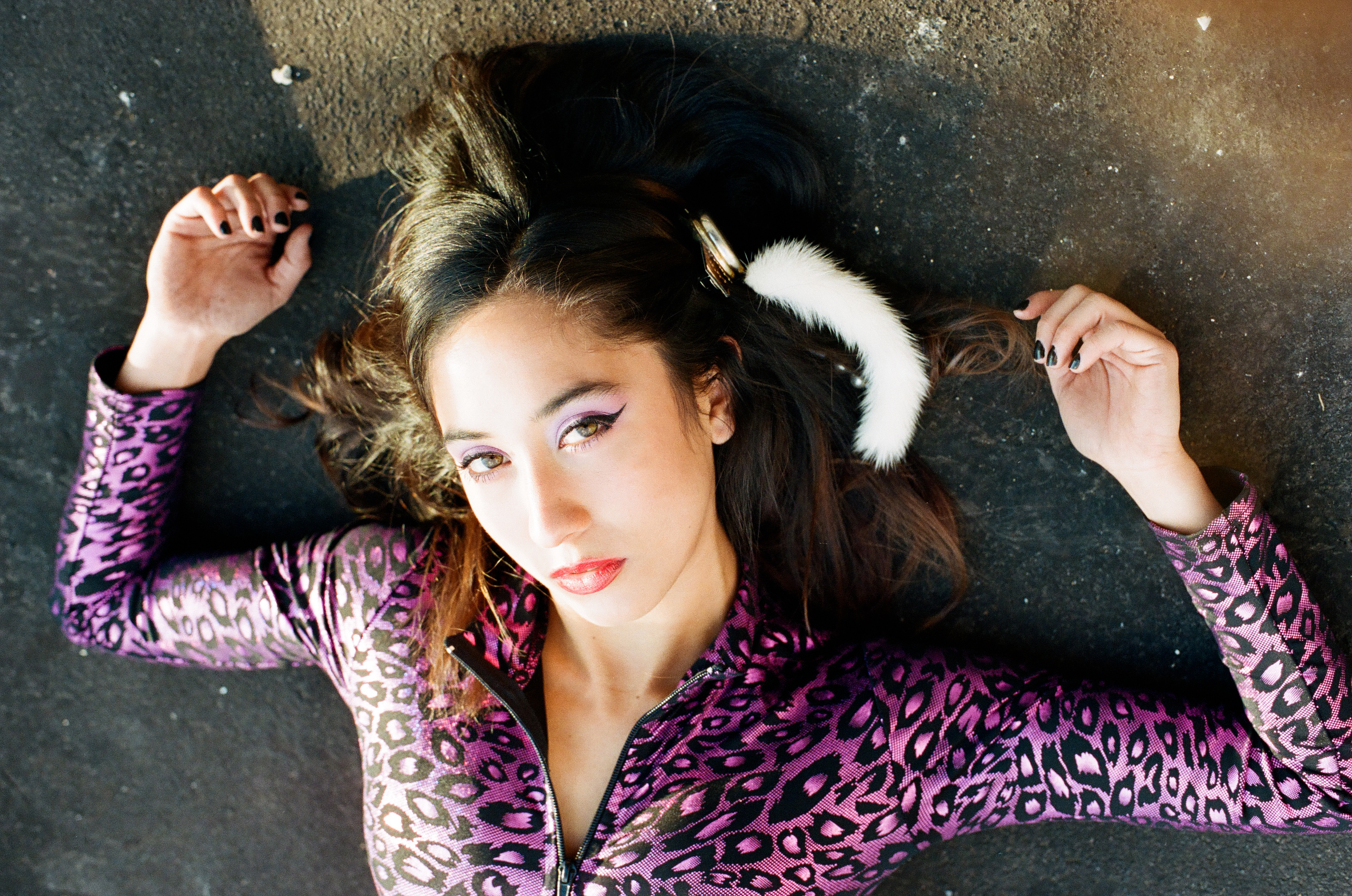
- Lovestory in 2020

Background information
- Born: Isabella Rodríguez Rivera; 30 November 1993 (age 32); Tegucigalpa, Honduras
- Genres: Neoperreo; reggaeton; electropop; perreo-pop
- Occupations: DJ; musician; producer; singer-songwriter
- Years active: 2018–present
- Labels: Twin Records; Giant Music
- Website: isabellalovestory.com

Isabella Rodríguez Rivera (born 30 November 1993), known professionally as Isabella Lovestory, is a Honduran pop and reggaeton singer based in Montreal, Canada. Her music has been described as perreo-pop.

Lovestory released her debut single, "Humo", in 2019. She gained further recognition in 2020 with the release of her single "Mariposa". She released her first full-length studio album Amor Hardcore in 2022, followed by her sophomore album Vanity in 2025. Lovestory has collaborated with many other artists such as Shygirl, Brooke Candy, Mura Masa, Bladee, Villano Antillano, and La Goony Chonga.

== Early life and education ==
Lovestory was born Isabella Rodríguez Rivera on 30 November 1993 in Tegucigalpa, Honduras. Her mother, Wendy Rivera, is an architect, and her father, Hector Rodriguez, was a radio show host; she has one younger brother named Andrès. She immigrated to the United States with her family at the age of 13 due to her mother's job, settling in Virginia, which she described as a culture shock. She moved to Montreal, Canada at the age of 17. She studied fine arts at Concordia University, but found its rules and structures dissatisfying and dropped out to become a musician. She initially started recording in 2018 with a song dedicated to her cat.

== Career ==
Lovestory began releasing DJ mixes and songs on her SoundCloud account before eventually releasing her debut mixtape, Juguete, in 2018. Following Juguete, she released two more extended plays, Humo in 2019 and Mariposa in 2020. Following success and praise from these releases, in 2021 she released three more singles, "Aló", "Vuelta", and "Tranki", respectively. Later that year, a second mixtape consisting of remixes from the latter EPs was released, which featured remixes from collaborators Kamixlo, Club Eat and Drumloop.

Lovestory's music reflects themes of self-expression and women's empowerment. She commented that Lovestory is a persona, and enjoys exaggerating her personality and having fun through the character. Lovestory's character embraces her own sexual objectification and commented: "Mocking men is fun. Mocking what society views as degrading to women is fun, because nobody gets to decide what a woman's true desires are."

In 2022, Lovestory was featured on SoundCloud's First on SoundCloud 2022 program, which is "an artist discovery program designed to break the next generation of superstars". Later that year, she released her debut album Amor Hardcore, which was proceeded by singles "Cherry Bomb", "Fashion Freak", "Sexo Amor Dinero" and "Exibisionista". The album saw collaborations from Six Sex and Ms Nina, and featured production from her main collaborator Chicken, alongside Kamixlo and Nick Léon. The album was recognized in various music and culture publications. The album was received well with critics, receiving a score of 7.2/10 from Pitchfork, the album was also ranked at 21st in the "50 Best Spanish-Language Albums of 2022" by Rolling Stone and was longlisted for the 2023 Polaris Music Prize. She also performed at the Pop Montreal festival later on in this year.

2022 also saw Lovestory produce, write and provide vocals for K-Pop girl group LE SSERAFIM, on their song "ANTIFRAGILE". The song incorporated Reggaeton and Neoperreo styles which Isabella has become known for. When announcing she had collaborated with LE SSERAFIM on the track she stated that she was "extremely happy" and that "dreams come true". She also collaborated with Mura Masa for a song on his demon time album, titled tonto, which they performed at Coachella together in 2023.

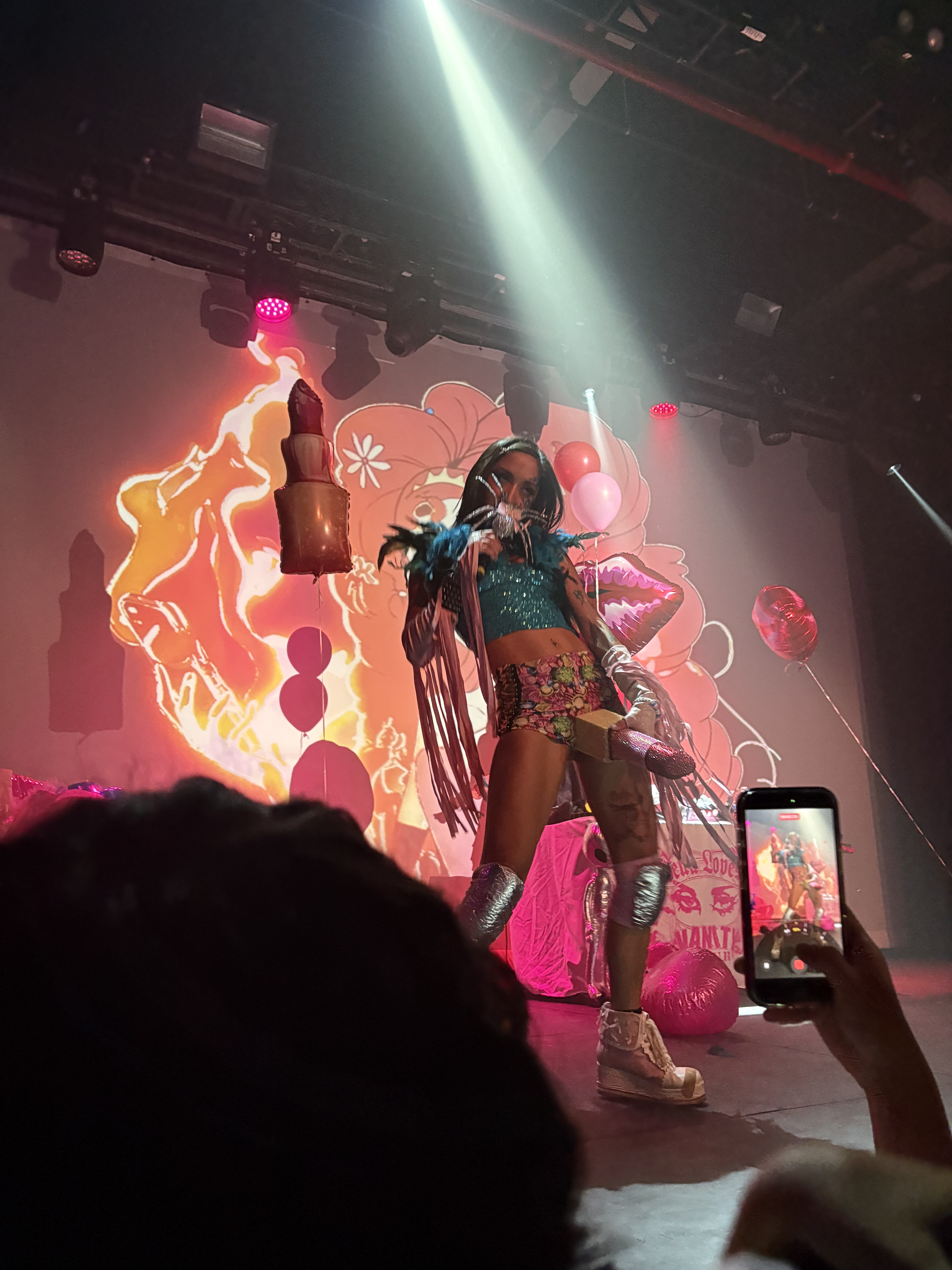
Isabella Lovestory performing on her Vanity tour in 2025

In 2023, Lovestory embarked on the Laticonica Tour with support from collaborator and boyfriend Kamixlo. The tour would be across 13 different countries over 24 dates. To support the tour, she released the single Latina. In July 2023, she played at the Festival d'été de Québec where she opened for Pitbull. In December 2023, she released "Fuetazo" featuring Villano Antillano in December 2023. The song was featured on Pitchfork's weekly selects playlist.

2024 saw Rodríguez embark on a European tour, the Plastic Fantasy Tour, was announced in May of this year and would see Lovestory play festivals such as CDMX Festival and MELT Festival in Germany. 2024 saw Lovestory release three singles, "Botoxxx", "VIP" and "Puchica", which was described as fun and carefree by Isabella herself. The latter two singles released this year would appear on Rodríguez’s second studio album.

In 2025, Lovestory announced her second studio album, Vanity, which was released on 27 June 2025. The album was preceded by six singles, "VIP", "Puchica", "Putita Boutique" with Taichu, "Telenovela", which was named Track of The Day by SoundCloud on April 28 of that year, Gorgeous and "Eurotrash". In a press release, Rodríguez described Vanity by saying "Thematically, this album explores fragility, how easily a mirror shatters, but it also explores the indestructible and eternal essence of beauty. I don’t mind when things break, I like to collect the pieces and create something new." The album has been received well by music critics, with critics noting Vanity's expansive range of genres and Isabella's lyricism. The album also placed 23 on Pitchfork’s Best Pop Albums list for the year. Alongside playing LadyLand festival on June 28, 2025, alongside FKA twigs and Pabllo Vittar, Lovestory would embark on the Vanity World Tour which saw her play shows in the United States, Canada, Europe and Latin America.

Vanity received a Juno Award nomination in the new Latin Music Recording of the Year category at the Juno Awards of 2026.

== Discography ==
=== Studio albums ===
List of studio albums, with selected details
Title	Details
Amor Hardcore	Released: 5 October 2022; Label: none (self-released); Formats: LP, digital download, streaming
Vanity	Released: 27 June 2025; Label: none (self-released), Giant Music; Formats: LP, Digital download, streaming

=== Mixtapes ===
List of mixtapes, with selected details
Title	Details
Juguete	Released: 29 May 2018; Label: none (self-released); Formats: Digital download, streaming
Remix Mixtape	Released: 6 May 2021; Label: none (self-released); Formats: Digital download, streaming
Vanity Remix Mixtape	Released: 23 September 2026; Label: none (self-released), Giant Music; Formats: Digital download, streaming

=== Extended plays ===
List of extended plays, with selected details
Title	Details
Humo	Released: 14 February 2019; Label: TWIN Records; Formats: Digital download, streaming
Mariposa	Released: 16 October 2020; Label: none (self-released); Formats: Digital download, streaming

=== Singles ===
==== As lead artist ====
List of singles as lead artist, showing year released, and originating album
Title	Year	Album
"Humo"	2019	Humo
"1 Time Thing"	2019	Humo
"JETAIME"	2020	Non-album single
"Golosa"	2020	Mariposa
"Kitten Heel"	2020	Mariposa
"Mariposa"	2020	Mariposa
"Whiskey & Coca-Cola"	2020	Mariposa
"Aló"	2021	Non-album single
"Vuelta"	2021	Non-album single
"Tranki"	2021	Non-album single
"Cherry Bomb"	2022	Amor Hardcore
"Fashion Freak"	2022	Amor Hardcore
"Sexo Amor Dinero"	2022	Amor Hardcore
"Exibisionista"	2022	Amor Hardcore
"Latina"	2023	Non-album single
"Fuetazo" (featuring Villano Antillano)	2023	Non-album single
"Botoxxx"	2024	Non-album single
"VIP"	2024	Vanity
"Puchica"	2024	Vanity
"Putita Boutique" (featuring Taichu)	2025	Vanity
"Telenovela"	2025	Vanity
"Gorgeous"	2025	Vanity
"Eurotrash"	2025	Vanity

==== As featured artist ====
List of singles as a featured artist, showing year released, and originating album
Title	Year	Album
"Sunnyside" (Coco & Clair Clair featuring Isabella Lovestory & Paul Maxwell)	2018	Non-album single
"Castasrofe" (Florentino featuring Isabella Lovestory)	2019	Ilimitado
"Entra In Me" (CECILIA featuring Isabella Lovestory)	2021	Summer In Sexilla
"O Sea, Si Te Quiero" (Nicola Cruz featuring Isabella Lovestory)	2021	Sentimientos Encontrados
"Fuego" (Florentino, Isabella Lovestory & Mc Buzzz featuring Mc Baby Perigosa)	2022	Non-album single
"Tonto" (Mura Masa featuring Isabella Lovestory)	2022	demon time
"Bad Vibes" (Palmistry, Bladee, Isabella Lovestory)	2022	PALMISTRY
"Glamorous" (Brooke Candy featuring Isabella Lovestory & Urias)	2024	SPIRAL
"Besos Robados" (DJ Python featuring Isabella Lovestory)	2025	i was put on this earth
"True Religion" (Shygirl featuring Isabella Lovestory & PinkPantheress)	2025	Club Shy Room 2

==== Promotional singles ====
List of promotional singles, showing year released, and originating album
Title	Year	Album
"Sunflower"	2023	The Sunflower Covers (From and Inspired by the Motion Picture "Spider-Man: Across the Spider-Verse")

=== Music videos ===
List of music videos, showing year released, and director
Title	Year	Director(s)
"Humo"	2019	Pepi Ginsberg
"1 Time Thing"	2019	Chicken
"JETAIME"	2020	Chicken
"Golosa"	2020	Tyler Cunningham
"Kitten Heel"	2020	Isabella Lovestory & Shahan Assadourian
"Mariposa"	2020	Chicken, Finnbar Porteous, Heji Shin & Isabella Lovestory
"Whiskey & Coca-Cola"	2020	Isabella Lovestory & Chicken
"Aló"	2021	Isabella Lovestory
"Vuelta"	2021	Isabella Lovestory
"Tranki"	2021	Isabella Lovestory
"Cherry Bomb"	2022	Isabella Lovestory
"Fashion Freak"	2022	Isabella Lovestory
"Sexo Amor Dinero"	2022	MOSHPXT
"Exibisionista"	2022	Samuel Ibram
"Keratina"	2022	Isabella Lovestory
"Gateo" (featuring Ms Nina)	2022	MOSHPXT
"Latina"	2023	Hugo Matula & Isabella Lovestory
"Fuetazo" (featuring Villano Antillano)	2023	JMP & Isabella Lovestory
"Botoxxx"	2024	Ariel Poupart
"VIP"	2024	Chicken & Isabella Lovestory
"Puchica"	2024	Isabella Lovestory
"Putita Boutique"	2025	Isabella Lovestory & Colter Fellows
"Telenovela"	2025	Charlotte Rutherford
"Gorgeous"	2025	Jim Alexander
"Vanity"	2025	Tohé Commaret
"Eurotrash"	2025	Victoria Davidoff
"Tu Te Vas"	2026	Claire Barrow
"Gorgeous (Remix)" (featuring The Deep and Cece Natalie)	2026	Hana Watanabe

== See also ==
- Latin American Canadians
- Music of Honduras
