= Fuetazo =

2023 single by Isabella Lovestory featuring Villano Antillano

Single by Isabella Lovestory featuring Villano Antillano
- Language: Spanish
- English title: "Sucker punch"
- Released: 6 December 2023
- Length: 2:23
- Label: Giant Music
- Songwriters: Burke Battelle; Camilo Padilla; Christian Dinamarca; Isabella Rodriguez; Villana Santiago
- Producers: Kamixlo; Dinamarca; Chicken

Isabella Lovestory singles chronology
"Latina" (2023)	"Fuetazo" (2023)	"Botoxxx" (2024)

Villano Antillano singles chronology
"Cuero" (2023)	"Fuetazo" (2023)	"Noches De Verano" (2024)

Music video
- "Fuetazo" on YouTube

"Fuetazo" (Spanish for "sucker punch") is a song recorded by Honduran singer-songwriter Isabella Lovestory featuring Puerto Rican rapper Villano Antillano. It was released on 6 December 2023 through Giant Music.

In December 2023, "Fuetazo" was included in Pitchfork's weekly selects playlist.

== Background ==
Lovestory met Antillano while touring in Madrid, Spain. They went to the studio after playing a show together and wrote "Fuetazo" in one night.

== Composition ==
"Fuetazo" was written by Burke Battelle, Camilo Padilla, Christian Dinamarca, Isabella Rodriguez, and Villana Santiago. It was composed in the key of B major with a tempo of 102 beats per minute.

== Music video ==
The accompanying music video for "Fuetazo" was released along with the song and it was directed by JMP and Lovestory. Tomás Mier of Rolling Stone said that the video shows "the two performers wearing mermaid tails while wading in water in the back of a truck and lying on a sandy beach."
