= Villano Antillano: Bzrp Music Sessions, Vol. 51 =

Single by Bizarrap and Villano Antillano
- Language: Spanish • English
- Released: June 9, 2022
- Recorded: 2022
- Studio: BZRP Studio (Ramos Mejía, Buenos Aires, Argentina)
- Genre: Hip house; pop rap; trap
- Length: 3:08
- Label: Dale Play
- Lyricist: Villana Santiago Pacheco
- Producer: Bizarrap

Bizarrap singles chronology
"Paulo Londra: Bzrp Music Sessions, Vol. 23" (2022)	"Villano Antillano: Bzrp Music Sessions, Vol. 51" (2022)	"Quevedo: Bzrp Music Sessions, Vol. 52" (2022)

Villano Antillano singles chronology
"Vocales" (2022)	"Villano Antillano: Bzrp Music Sessions, Vol. 51" (2022)	"KLK" (2022)

Music video
- "Villano Antillano: Bzrp Music Sessions, Vol. 51" on YouTube

"Villano Antillano: Bzrp Music Sessions, Vol. 51" is a song by Argentine producer Bizarrap and Puerto Rican rapper Villano Antillano, belonging to the BZRP Music Sessions. The collaboration marked a breakthrough for Antillano's career, being her first song to chart in various countries such as United States, Spain and Mexico.

== Background ==
The Session was announced by Bizarrap on June 7, 2022 on his social networks, through a promotional video in Madrid. In it, Bizarrap places a blackboard with a message in which he invites passersby to listen to his new session in a small room: "Listen to the next BZRP Session here." The video shows the reaction of the people when hearing the song, and them having a conversation with Bizarrap, who was hidden behind a black curtain.

Villano Antillano stated in an interview that she met Bizarrap thanks to Bad Bunny after an event, and it was approximately two months later when they decided to record a Session together.

=== Commercial performance ===
The single was well received by the public, managing to position itself on the charts of several countries, with the highest position reaching number 5 in Spain.

Thanks to the single, Villano Antillano was the first transgender woman to enter Spotify's Global Top 50, counting at that time with more than 50 million streams.

The single currently has more than 210 million streams on the platform since its release.

== Music video ==
The official music video was released on the Bizarrap's channel in YouTube on 9 June 2022. It has accumulated over 232 million views as of October 2023.

The clip was shot in the usual style as the other Music Sessions: that rapper performing the song on a microphone while Bizarrap produces the song in the background. On the second refrain, Villano is suddenly holding up a hand fan, which disappears in the next shot.

During the video clip, a cap with the letter R, belonging to Residente, can be seen in the background. However, from the second 0:45 to 0:52, the letter that appears on the cap changes to a Q, this would be the initial of the word Queer, with which Villano identifies, and refers to the fight that singer carries on. Other people affirm that it was a small advance on what would be the next BZRP Music Session, with the Spanish singer Quevedo.

== Reception ==
Although the song was generally well received by Bizarrap's followers, the Session had to deal with certain transphobic comments and hate messages towards Villano Antillano, such as "The Session comes with a surprise" or "He's a transformer." However, beyond some unfortunate comments, thousands of people came out to support and defend Villano for these messages.

== Charts ==
Chart performance for "Villano Antillano: Bzrp Music Sessions, Vol. 51"
Chart (2021–2022)	Peak position
Argentina (Argentina Hot 100)	10
Colombia (Billboard)	23
Mexico (Billboard)	25
Peru (Billboard)	18
Spain (PROMUSICAE)	5
Uruguay (CUD)	8

== Certifications ==
Certifications and sales for "Villano Antillano: Bzrp Music Sessions, Vol. 51"
Region	Certification	Certified units/sales
Spain (Promusicae)	3× Platinum	180,000^{‡}
^{‡} Sales+streaming figures based on certification alone.
