= La sustancia X =

Studio album by Villano Antillano
- Released: December 2, 2022
- Length: 32:02
- Language: Spanish
- Label: Sony Latin
- Producer: Villano Antillano; Mauro; Ismael Cancel; Young Martino; Jean Carlos Hernandez-Espinell; DJ Maff; Puka; Mitxhell; Marc Damble; Yaite Ramos; Orteez

Singles from La sustancia X
- 1. "Cáscara de coco" Released: November 11, 2022

Professional ratings
Review scores
Source	Rating
Mondo Sonoro	7/10
Pitchfork	7.9/10
Rolling Stone	4/5 stars

La sustancia X (Spanish for "substance X") is the debut studio album by Puerto Rican rapper Villano Antillano. It was released on December 2, 2022, through Sony Music Latin.

== Track listing ==
La sustancia X track listing
No.	Title	Producer(s)	Length
1.	"Precaución, esta canción es un hechizo"	Villano Antillano; Mauro; Ismael Cancel	2:53
2.	"Hedonismo"	Antillano; Young Martino; Cancel	3:10
3.	"Cáscara de coco"	Antillano; Jean Carlos Hernandez-Espinell; Cancel	2:56
4.	"Kaleidoscópica"	Antillano; Hernandez-Espinell; Cancel	2:34
5.	"Designer Pussy"	Antillano; DJ Maff; Cancel	1:53
6.	"Yo tengo un novio"	Antillano; Puka; Cancel	2:37
7.	"¡Hello Kitty!"	Antillano; Mauro; Mitxhell; Cancel	2:52
8.	"Puesta" (featuring la Dame Blanche)	Antillano; Cancel; Marc Damble; Yaite Ramos	3:13
9.	"Mujer" (featuring iLe)	Antillano; Puka; Cancel	3:48
10.	"Nena mala"	Antillano; Puka; Cancel	2:48
11.	"Poli"	Antillano; Orteez; Cancel	3:13
Total length:			32:02

Notes

- "Precaución, esta canción es un hechizo" is stylized as "Precaución, esta canción es un hechizo.", that is, with a full stop
- "Designer Pussy" is stylized as "Designer Pu$$y"
