= Aline Küppenheim =

Chilean actress

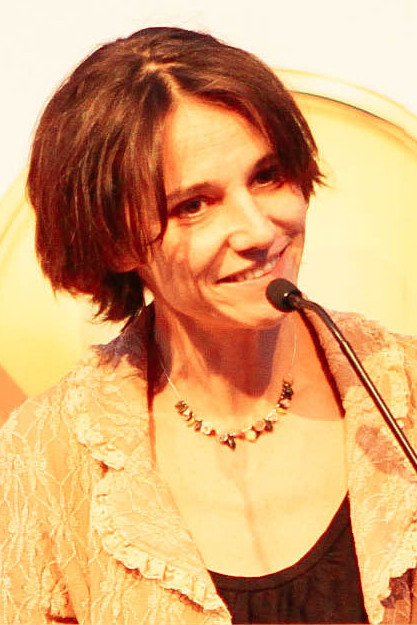
- Küppenheim supporting Michelle Bachelet's presidential campaign in 2013
- Born: Aline Adriana Küppenheim Gualtieri; 10 August 1969 (age 56); Barcelona, Catalonia, Spain
- Occupation: Actress
- Years active: 1991–present
- Spouse: Bastián Bodenhöfer (m. 2000; div. 2006)
- Children: 1 son

Aline Adriana Küppenheim Gualtieri (born 10 August 1969) is a Chilean film and television actress.

== Early life and career ==
Born to a French father of German descent and a Chilean mother of Italian descent, Küppenheim spent her early years traveling around different parts of Europe due to her parents' trade, both of whom were artisans. During this time, her interest in drawing also developed, as she used to draw with chalk on the streets of Paris while her parents worked.

In the early 1980s, Küppenheim returned to Chile and studied at La Girouette School in Las Condes. Later, she studied theater at Fernando González's academy-club.

Küppenheim made her telenovela debut in 1991 with the successful TV series Ellas por ellas on Canal 13, playing the role of Victoria "Vicky". She later moved to TVN and appeared in the teleseries Trampas y caretas and Jaquemate, where she landed her first significant role as one of the young protagonists of the story alongside Felipe Camiroaga.

Afterwards, Küppenheim returned to Channel 13 and appeared in several teleseries such as Champaña, El amor está de moda (where she made her debut as a singer interpreting the central theme of the show), Marron Glacé, el regreso, Eclipse de luna and Amándote. She then switched back to TVN, where she landed her first antagonistic role in the telenovela La Fiera, starring Claudia Di Girolamo. After the series ended, she decided to accompany her husband at the time, actor Bastián Bodenhöfer, to France, where he was appointed cultural attaché.

In 2004, Küppenheim returned to Chile and starred in Destinos cruzados and Entre medias. She was later signed by the production company Roos Film to star in the Chilean adaptation of Montecristo, which marked the end of her time in Mega. She also made a brief guest appearance in some episodes of Fortunato, the Chilean adaptation of a popular Argentine show.

On television, Küppenheim has also appeared in series such as JPT: Justicia para todos and Cárcel de mujeres 2.

In film, Küppenheim starred in Sangre de Cuba (Dreaming of Julia), where she shared the screen with actors such as Gael García Bernal and Harvey Keitel. Her performance in Machuca was highly praised, where she portrayed María Luisa Infante, a wealthy woman caught up in the changes brought about by the coup in Chile in 1973. In 2008, she won a Pedro Sienna Award for her role in Andres Wood's The Good Life. In 2011, she appeared in Prófugos as Prosecutor Ximena Carbonell. In 2014, she won an Altazor Award for Best Television Series Actress for her work in Ecos del desierto. In 2017, she stood out in her role in A Fantastic Woman, winner of the Academy Award for Best Foreign Language Film.

In 2022, Küppenheim starred alongside Claudia Di Girolamo in the Netflix series 42 Days of Darkness. In its opening week, the show climbed to the top of the streaming platform's list and settled into seventh place for the most successful non-English speaking series, accumulating 9.9 million hours viewed since its premiere. Later that year, she won the Best Actress award at the Tokyo International Film Festival for her leading role in Manuela Martelli's debut film, 1976.

== Personal life ==
Küppenheim was in relationships with Álvaro Rudolphy and Luciano Cruz-Coke during the 1990s. Later, she married actor Bastián Bodenhöfer in 2000, with whom she has a son named Ian, born in the same year. However, their marriage ended in 2006.

After that, Küppenheim began a relationship with an Italian man named Renzo Melai, who died on June 23, 2008, after his motorcycle collided with a truck in Peñalolén, Chile. According to the newspaper La Tercera, Melai had been working as an adventure tourism guide since he arrived in Chile in 2000.

== Filmography ==
Film
Year	Title	Role	Notes
2024	Maybe It's True What They Say About Us		
2023	Detrás de la lluvia		
2022	1976	Carmen	
2018	Princesita		
2017	A Fantastic Woman		
2014	El bosque de Karadima		
2014	Allende en su laberinto		
2012	Young and Wild		
2012	Las mujeres de Neruda		
2008	The Good Life	Teresa	
2007	Scrambled Beer	Bárbara	
2008	Turistas		
2007	Malta con huevo		
2005	Play		
2005	Pecados		
2005	Alberto: ¿quién sabe cuánto cuesta hacer un ojal?		
2005	El baño		
2004	Machuca		
2003	Dreaming of Julia		
2003	Buscando a la señorita Hyde		
2000	Historias de sexo		
1998	El hombre que imaginaba		

TV Series
Year	TV series	Role	
1991	Ellas por ellas	Victoria Celemín	
1992	Trampas y caretas	Antonia Fernández	Reparto
1993	Jaque mate	Carolina Möller	Reparto
1994	Champaña	Valentina Garcés	Papel co-principal
1994	Soltero a la medida	Ángela Soldi	Papel co-principal
1995	El amor está de moda	Valeria Correa	Papel co-principal
1996	Marrón Glacé, el regreso	Margot Derville	Antagonista
1996	Vecinos puertas adentro	Daniela	Papel principal
1997	Eclipse de luna	Almendra Riva	Papel principal
1998	Amándote	Susana Álvarez	Papel principal
1999	La Fiera	Magdalena Ossandón "La Joyita"	Antagonista
2003	Justicia para todos	Rocío Castañeda	Papel principal
2004	Destinos cruzados	Laura Squella	Papel principal
2005	Heredia y asociados	Emilia Mollet	Episodio: ¿Quién mató a Trinidad Mollet?
2005	Justicia para todos 2	Rocío Castañeda	Papel principal
2006	Entre medias	Maite Contreras	Papel principal
2006	El Aval	Abril	Papel principal
2006	Montecristo	Victoria Sáenz	Papel co-principal
2007	Fortunato	Rita Oyarzún	Especial
2007	Mujeres que matan	Matilde	Episodio: ¿?
2008	Cárcel de mujeres 2	Francisca Ossandón	2 episodios
2011	Divino tesoro	Maritza Paredes	Reparto
2011-2013	Prófugos	Ximena Carbonell	Papel co-principal
2013	Ecos del desierto	Carmen Hertz	Papel principal
2015	El bosque de Karadima, la serie	Leonor Leyton	Reparto
2016	Bala loca	Ángela Sepúlveda	Reparto
2017	12 días que estremecieron a Chile	Carmen Haselberg	Episodio: Caso Joannon
2019	En terapia	Alicia	Papel co-principal
2022	42 Days of Darkness	Verónica Montes	Main role
