= Rolling Stone en Español Awards =

Ibero-American annual music and film award ceremony

- Awarded for: Excellence in Ibero-American media productions.
- Sponsored by: Zyn
- Country: Ibero-America
- Presented by: Rolling Stone en Español
- First award: October 26, 2023
- Website: premiosrsee.com

The ZYN Rolling Stone en Español Awards are an annual awards presented by the Spanish language edition of the American magazine Rolling Stone. The awards ceremony is intended to recognize excellence in productions made by Ibero-American artists and includes categories for music releases as well as for feature films and television/streaming series.

The inaugural edition of the awards is set to take place on October 26, 2023, at The Fillmore in Miami Beach, United States.

== Background ==
American popular culture magazine Rolling Stone has released various international versions over the years. Among them, versions for Argentina, Colombia, Mexico and Spain have been released, all in Spanish. In 2023, it was announced that an awards ceremony would be presented later in the year, intended to "highlight creations that have outstanding cultural impact, innovation, originality, boldness, quality, and a significant contribution to the industry". Similar initiatives have been made for the British and Australian versions of the magazine, with the latter, the Rolling Stone Australia Awards, being handled since 2010.

== Categories ==
=== Music ===
- Album of the Year
- Song of the Year
- Artist of the Year
- Promising Artist of the Year
- Video of the Year
- Music Producer of the Year

=== Film / Series ===
- Fiction Feature Film of the Year
- Series of the Year
- Performance of the Year
- Direction of the Year
- Documentary Feature Film of the Year

== Ceremonies ==
- 2023
