= Yung Beef =

Spanish rapper

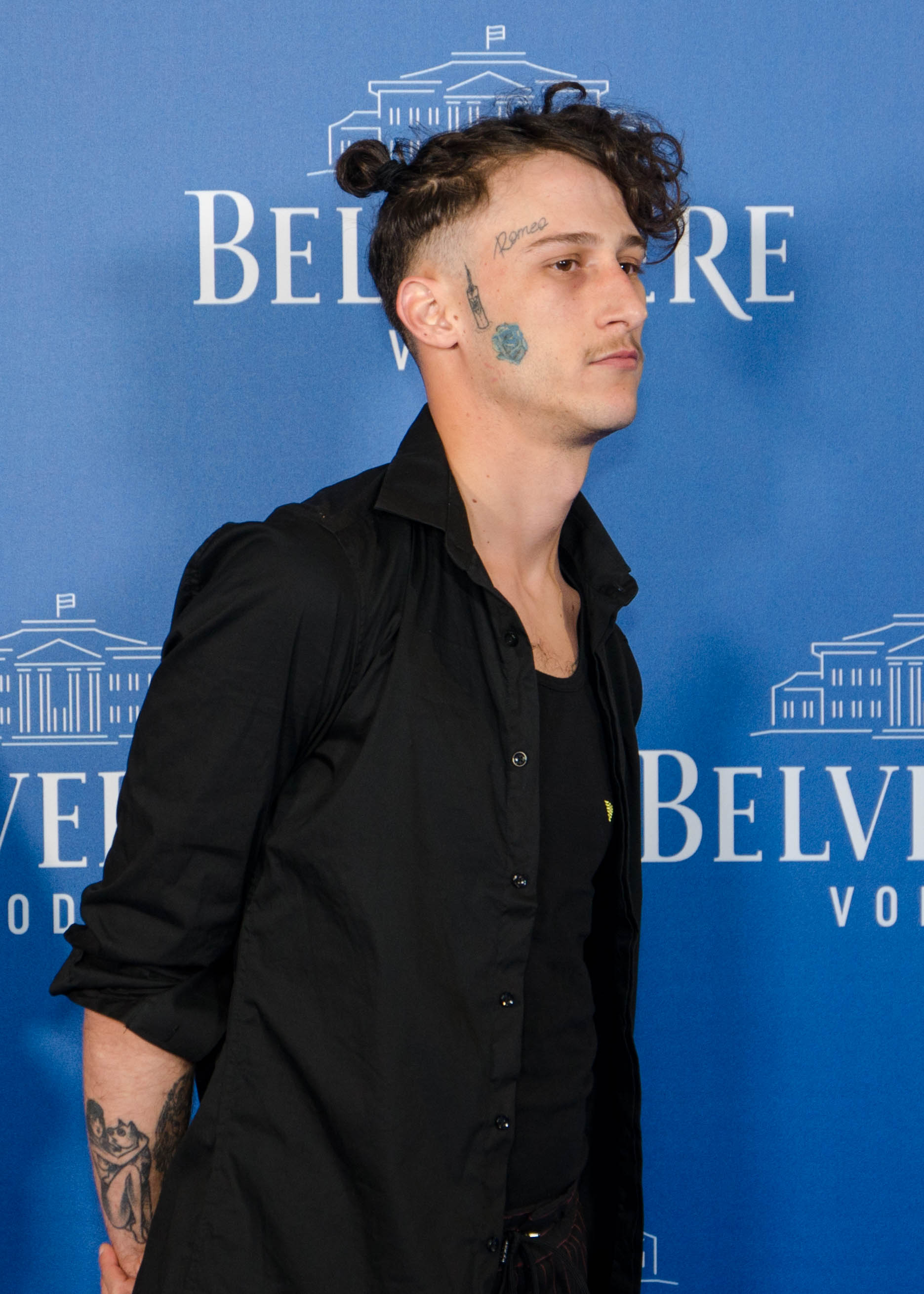
- Yung Beef in 2018
- Born: Fernando Gálvez Gómez; 23 January 1990 (age 36); Granada, Spain
- Occupations: Rapper; singer; record producer; model
- Musical career
- Genre: Spanish trap
- Label: La Vendición

Fernando Galvez Gómez (born 23 January 1990), known artistically as Yung Beef, is a Spanish rapper, singer, record producer and model. He is known for his mixing of Latin trap, salsa and reggaeton, as well as his bold fashion sense.

== Career ==
He began to become popular as a member of the extinct PXXR GVNG (today Los Santos), which was the first trap collective to sign with a multinational, but now he runs his own record label, La Vendición Records. He later gained popularity in the Spanish rap scene with his acclaimed mixtape A.D.R.O.M.I.C.F.M.S., with productions by Steve Lean and 808 Mafia.

In March 2017, Yung Beef and a number of other international artists were denied entrance into the U.S. and unable to perform at the South by Southwest music festival.

In the summer of 2016, he landed a Calvin Klein campaign and modelled for Hood By Air during Paris Fashion Week.

== Partial discography ==
=== Mixtapes ===
- A.D.R.O.M.I.C.F.M.S. 1 (2013)
- #Freemolly (with Steve Lean) (2014)
- Trunks Future Bricks (2015)
- Perreo de la Muerte (2015)
- A.D.R.O.M.I.C.F.M.S. 2 (with Steve Lean) (2015)
- Fashion Mixtape (2016)
- La Última Cena (with Fly Migo Bankroll) (2016)
- Kowloon Mixtape (2017)
- ADROMICFMS 4 (2018)
- El Plugg Mixtape (2018)
- Traumatismo Kraneoencefálico (with Goa) (2018)
- Perreo de la Muerte 2 (2019)
- Perreo de la Muerte 2.5 (2020)
- Shishi Plugg (2020)
- Lágrimas (2020)
- Sonrisas (2020)
- El Plugg 2 (2021)
- Gangster Original (2021)
- #A.D.R.O.M.I.C.F.M.S. 4 1/2 (2023)
- Traumatismo Kraneoencefálico 2 (with Goa) (2025)
- El Plugg 3 Ova 1 (2025)
- El Plugg 3 Ova 2 (2026)

=== Greatest hits albums ===
- Grandes Clásicos (2018)

=== Tracks ===
- Dinero De La Ola (for Mixtape Volume 1 by Neymar Jr. and Nike)
