= Omar Montes =

Spanish singer (born 1988)

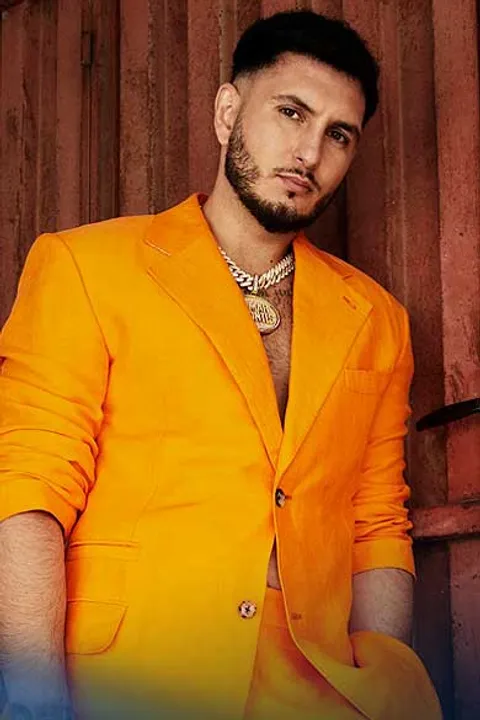
- Born: Omar Ismael Montes Moreno; 22 June 1988 (age 38); Madrid, Community of Madrid, Spain
- Occupation: Singer
- Years active: 2015–present
- Musical career
- Label: Sony Spain

Omar Ismael Montes Moreno (born 22 June 1988) is a Spanish singer and media personality who became known for his appearances in reality shows such as Mujeres y Hombres y Viceversa, Gran Hermano VIP, and Supervivientes, as well as for his relationship with Isa Pantoja (Isabel Pantoja's daughter). As a singer, he has achieved great success with some of his songs, such as "Alocao", "Solo" or "La Rubia (Remix 2)", with which he has achieved several platinum and gold record certifications.

Although the start of his career as a musician was in 2015, he began to be known for his sentimental relationship with Isa Pantoja and his participation in Gran Hermano VIP 6 in 2018. His life took a turn after his participation in Supervivientes 2019, when he became known to the general public.

== Biography ==
=== Early years and arrival on the television scene ===
He was born in the district of Carabanchel in Madrid. He became the Spanish Welterweight boxing champion, with more than 100 fights behind him. His foray into music began in 2015, coinciding with the debut of his first music video, "Mentiras." Years later, he participated on the reality show Gran Hermano VIP 6, where he shared a home with his then-partner, Isa Pantoja, as well as other celebrities such as Mónica Hoyos, Ángel Garó, and El Koala. Omar entered as a reserve in the contest and, after 14 days in the house and a direct nomination for inciting a partner to abuse a contestant, he became the third expelled of the edition.

=== 2018–2019: Supervivientes and first music hits ===
After his participation in the Telecinco reality show, Omar's professional career skyrocketed, releasing several singles with other artists, such as: "Así Así" with Alba Dreid, "Fuego" with Moncho Chavea, Denom, Fyahbwoy and Arce, and "Mamá" with Juanjo Sánchez and Daviles de Novelda, among others. In addition, his television career also increased with several interviews on programs such as Sábado Deluxe, Mujeres y Hombres y Viceversa, or Viva la Vida.

In 2019, he participated in the reality show Supervivientes, where he shared editions with his ex-mother-in-law Isabel Pantoja, journalist Chelo GarcÍa Cortés, singers Encarna Salazar and Toñi Salazar, and the presenter Carlos Lozano; in addition, he coincided again with Mónica Hoyos, one of his companions in Gran Hermano Vip 6, among others. Coinciding with his victory in the reality show, he released the remix "La Rubia" with La Nueva Escuela, a song that went platinum and stayed on the charts for several weeks.

With the success of the single "La rubia (Remix 2)" and the imminent release of his first album, "La Vida Mártir", it was announced the release of a song with the singer Bad Gyal called "Alocao", which remained number 1 in the charts for weeks and received four platinum discs. His singles and collaborations after "Alocao" have received great success among the public, especially "Como el agua" with Ana Mena, "Pegamos tela" with Abraham Mateo and Lérica, with a gold record, "Prendío (Remix)" in collaboration with RVFV and Daviles de Novelda, which remained in the charts from January 2020 until March 2020 and went platinum. Or "Más y más" with Ñengo Flow, which in less than 24 hours became the top trend on YouTube Spain.

As for his television career, in addition to participating in two reality-shows on the Mediaset network, he has collaborated on the program Mujeres y Hombres y Viceversa. He has also appeared in several interviews, such as the Christmas Eve special of Mi casa es la tuya with other artists such as Ainhoa Arteta, Santi Millán, or Paz Padilla, presented by Bertín Osborne, in Volverte a Ver, presented by Carlos Sobera, or in a special video of El hormiguero, presented by Pablo Motos.

=== 2020–present: Stability in music ===
In 2020, he was nominated for the Odeon Awards in the category "Best Song" with his song "La Rubia (Remix 2)" together with La Nueva Escuela. That same year, after the sustained increase of his cache in recent years, some sources estimated that Montes was earning 160,000 euros per month thanks to events, private parties, and concerts.

In the summer of 2020, he released with Nyno Vargas the song "Hola, Nena", with which he achieved platinum certification, and "Tinder" with Arce. At the end of the same year, it became known that he was the most listened Spanish singer on the Spotify platform.

In 2021, he released the single "Solo" with Ana Mena and Maffio, which became number 1 in YouTube trends in a short time and reached the seventh position in the top songs in Spain. The single was certified double platinum by the Spanish Music Producers. That same year, he participated in the second edition of the contest El Desafío on Antena 3, where he competed with celebrities such as Norma Duval, El Monaguillo, or Jesulín de Ubrique. In May, he released the single "Pa Ti" together with Italian artist Baby K. The song quickly entered the Italian charts at the 95th position. In June, he released the song "No quiero amor" with RVFV, which reached the 24th position in the Spanish music charts. In July, he collaborated with Camela on the single "Vete" and with Fabbio and Lennis Rodríguez in "Diablita remix". In August, he released a collaboration with JC el Diamante titled "Beba que quieres que haga".

In July 2021 Amazon Prime Video announced the development of a documentary series about the singer titled El Principito es Omar Montes for the end of the same year, composed of four episodes with key moments for the artist, remembering from his beginnings in Pan Bendito to his subsequent rise to fame and the management of this, as well as facing his ghosts to find inspiration for his next album. The project was released on November 12 on the platform. In August of the same year, he made his debut as a contributor to the Spanish television program Lazos de sangre. He also joined the remix of the song "Diablita" by Fabio Colloricchio, with which he obtained platinum certification and he also released the single "Beba que quieres que haga", with which he obtained another gold record certification.

He debuted as a runway model for Mercedes-Benz Fashion Week Madrid in September, working with designer Ágatha Ruiz de la Prada. In addition, his signing as a consultant for the next season of La Voz Senior on Antena 3 was announced, as well as his debut as a presenter for channel Cuatro with the talk show Montes y cía, for which he signed a five-episode contract. In October, he received a nomination for the Los40 Music Awards 2021 in the category of "Artist or group from 40 to 1".

Omar also participated in the seventh edition of the Spanish reality TV show MasterChef Celebrity, with celebrities such as José Mota, Isabel Preysler, Lorenzo Caprile, and Alba Carrillo.

On 23 March 2026 he announced he will quit his musical career this year.

== Discography ==
=== Studio albums ===
List of studio albums, with selected details, and chart positions
Title	Details	Peak
Title	Details	SPA
La vida mártir	Release: 5 April 2019; Label: Zamara Music; Format: CD, digital download, streaming	10
Quejíos de un Maleante	Release: 25 November 2022; Label: Sony Music; Format: CD, digital download, streaming	23
Lagrimas de un Maleante	Release: 24 May 2024; Label: Sony Music; Format: CD, digitaldownload, streaming	22

=== Singles ===
List of singles as lead artist, showing year released, chart positions, certifications, and originating album
Title	Year	Peak chart positions		Certifications	Album
Title	Year	SPA	ITA	Certifications	Album
"Más que amigos" (with Ylenia Padilla and Moncho Chavea)	2016	—	—		Non-album single
"Conmigo" (with Moncho Chavea)	2017	—	—		Non-album single
"Así así" (with Alba Dreid)	2017	—	—		Non-album single
"Fuego" (with Moncho Chavea, Denom, Fyahbwoy and Arce)	2018	—	—		Non-album single
"Pantera" (with Daviles de Novelda and Salcedo Leyry)	2018	—	—		Non-album single
"Tiki tiki" (with Elias, and Moncho Chavea)	2018	—	—		Non-album single
"La rubia (remix 2)" (with La Nueva Escuela)	2019	5	—	PROMUSICAE: 3× Platinum	Non-album single
"Alocao" (with Bad Gyal)	2019	1	—	PROMUSICAE: 5× Platinum	Non-album single
"Morena"	2019	—	—		La vida mártir
"Como el agua" (with Ana Mena)	2019	81	—		La vida mártir
"Prendío (remix)" (with RVFV y Daviles de Novelda)	2019	14	—	PROMUSICAE: 2× Platinum	Non-album single
"Pegamos tela" (with Abraham Mateo and Lérica)	2020	17	—	PROMUSICAE: Platinum	Non-album single
"No me olvida" (with Robledo and Quimico Ultramega)	2020	84	—		Non-album single
"Más y más" (with Ñengo Flow)	2020	45	—		Non-album single
"Rueda (remix)" (with Chimbala and Juan Magán)	2020	44	—	PROMUSICAE: Gold	Non-album single
"Hola, nena" (with Nyno Vargas)	2020	9	—	PROMUSICAE: Platinum	Non-album single
"Tinder" (with Arce)	2020	49	—		Non-album single
"Dime bbsita (remix)" (with Antonio Hernández and Moncho Chavea)	2020	47	—		Non-album single
"No puedo amar" (with RVFV)	2020	24	—	PROMUSICAE: Gold	Non-album single
"En mute" (with Lérica and Cali y el Dandee)	2020	—	—		Non-album single
"Normal que se lo crea" (with Daviles de Novelda, RVFV)	2020	75	—		Non-album single
"Fake Capo (remix)" (with RVFV and Karetta el Gucci)	2020	28	—	PROMUSICAE: Gold	Non-album single
"Rebelde" (with Yotuel and Beatriz Luengo)	2021	85	—		Non-album single
"Solo" (with Ana Mena and Maffio)	2021	7	—	PROMUSICAE: 3× Platinum	Non-album single
"Pa ti" (with Baby K)	2021	—	69	FIMI: Gold	Non-album single
"No quiero amor" (with RVFV)	2021	24	—	PROMUSICAE: Platinum	Non-album single
"Vete" (with Camela)	2021	—	—		Non-album single
"Diablita remix" (with Fabbio and Lennis Rodríguez)	2021	14	—	PROMUSICAE: 2× Platinum	Non-album single
"Beba que quieres que haga" (with JC el Diamante)	2021	8	—	PROMUSICAE: Platinum	Non-album single
"Rakata remix" (with various artists)	2021	39	—	PROMUSICAE: Gold	Non-album single
"Vida loca" (with Aiman JR)	2022	—	—		Non-album single
"Bésame" (with Kevin Roldán)	2022	82	—		Non-album single
"La culpa" (with C. Tangana)	2022	8	—		Non-album single
"Risueña" (with Daviles de Novelda)	2022	23	—		Non-album single
"Sueño" (with Llane)	2022				Fino
"La llama del amor" (with Jairo deRemache)	2022	6	—		Quejíos de un Maleante
"Tú y yo" (with Beret)	2022	77	—		Non-album single
"Si tú te vas" (with Khaled, Kaydy Cain and Yung Beef)	2022	6	—		Non-album single
"Una y Mil Veces" (with C. Tangana)	2022	11	—		Quejíos de un Maleante
"Patio de la Carcel" (with Farruko)	2022	14	—		Quejíos de un Maleante
"Arena y Sal" (with Saiko and Tunvao)	2023	6	—		Non-album single
"Spanish Teteo" (with RVFV and Rels B)	2023	44	—		Non-album single
"Oye BB" (with Nicky Jam)	2023	43	—		Non-album single
"Falsos Recuerdos" (with Abraham Mateo)	2024	22	—		Non-album single
"El Conjuntito" (with El Bobe)	2024	1	—		
"Le Sevillana"	2024	2	—		Lagrimas de un Maleante
"El Pantalon (Rumbas)" (with Lola Índigo and Las Chuches)	2024	3	—		Lagrimas de un Maleante
"Goteras" (with JC Reyes)	2024	3	—		Lagrimas de un Maleante
"Yotuloko" (with Rels B)	2024	18	—		
"—" denotes a recording that did not chart or was not released in that territory.

== Trajectory ==
=== Television programs ===
==== As collaborator / guest ====
Year	Program	Function	Channel
2019 - 2020	Mujeres y hombres y viceversa	Opinionist	Cuatro
2020 - 2021	Los Gipsy Kings	Starring	Cuatro
2020	Typical Spanish	Guest	TVE
2021	¡Feliz 2021!	Guest	TVE
2021	La resistencia	Guest	#0
2021	Lazos de sangre	Guest	TVE
2021	El hormiguero	Guest	Antena 3
2021	Ya son las ocho	Guest	Telecinco
2021	El principito	Starring	Amazon Prime Video
2022 - presente	La Voz Senior	Advisor	Antena 3
2022 - presente	Idol Kids	Jury	Telecinco
2022	Planeta Calleja	Guest	Cuatro

==== As a contestant ====
Year	Program	Function	Channel	Notes
2018	Gran Hermano VIP 6	Contestant	Telecinco	3rd eliminated
2019	Supervivientes: Perdidos en Honduras (2019)	Contestant	Telecinco	Winner
2019	Ven a cenar conmigo	Contestant / Host	Cuatro	Finalist
2022	El Desafío 2	Contestant	Antena 3	Runner-up

=== Television series ===
- 2019: Una vida de mierda on Mtmad as himself in an episode.

=== Promotional videos ===
- 2020: Hormigueddon on Antena 3 (YouTube).
- 2021: La clase de recuperación de El internado: Las Cumbres on Prime Video (YouTube).

== Awards and nominations ==
Year	Award	Category	Nominated work	Result	Ref.
2020	Premios Odeón	Best Song	«La rubia (Remix 2)» with La Nueva Escuela	Nominated	
2020	LOS40 Music Awards	Best new artist or group in Latin category	Himself	Nominated	
2021	Latin Music Italian Awards	Best Euro-Latin song	«Alocao» with Bad Gyal	Won	
2021	Premios Odeón	Best urban song	«Alocao» with Bad Gyal	Nominated	
2021	Premios Odeón	Best urban song	«Prendio (Remix)» with RVFV and Daviles de Novelda	Nominated	
2021	Premios Odeón	Odeon urban revelation artist	Himself	Nominated	
2021	LOS40 Music Awards	Artist or group from 40 to 1	Himself	Nominated	
