= Supervivientes: Perdidos en Honduras (2019) =

- Presented by: Jorge Javier Vázquez; Lara Álvarez
- No. of days: 85
- No. of castaways: 18
- Winner: Omar Montes
- Location: Cayos Cochinos, Honduras

Release
- Original network: Telecinco; Cuatro
- Original release: 25 April – 18 July 2019

Season chronology
- ← Previous; 2018 Next → 2020

Supervivientes 2019: Perdidos en Honduras is the fourteenth season of the show Supervivientes and the eighteenth season of Survivor to air in Spain. It was broadcast on Telecinco from 25 April 2019 to 18 July 2019. Jorge Javier Vázquez was the main host at the central studio in Madrid, with Lara Álvarez co-hosting from the island, Jordi Gonzalez hosting a side debate of the program and Carlos Sobera hosting a gala in Cuatro.

== Cast ==
On Saturday 20, all the contestants were spotted at the airport traveling to Honduras. The full line-up is:

Contestant	Occupation/Famous For	Original tribe	First switched tribe	Second switched tribe	Merged tribe	Finish
Loly Álvarez; 48, Toledo	Showbiz personality	Señores				1st voted out Day 15
Encarna Salazar; 58, Badajoz; Toñi's sister	Azúcar Moreno singer	Piratas				Quit; Day 18
Toñi Salazar; 56, Badajoz; Encarna's sister	Azúcar Moreno singer	Piratas				Quit; Day 18
Aneth Acosta; 31, Lima, Peru	Television personality	Señores	Abandonados			2nd voted out Day 22
Jonathan Piqueras; 20, Valencia	Television personality	Abandonados	Forgotten Pirate			3rd voted out Day 29
Lidia Santos; 26, Málaga	Curvy model	Señores		Abandonados		4th voted out Day 36
Carlos Lozano; 56, Madrid	Television host	Piratas	Señores	Forgotten Pirate		5th voted out Day 43
Oto Vans; 23, Madrid, Croatia	YouTuber	Abandonados	Señores	Abandonados		6th voted out Day 50
Violeta Mangriñán; 24, Valencia	MyHyV star	Abandonados	Piratas	Abandonados	Merged	Evacuated; Day 55
Colate Vallejo-Nágera; 47, Miami	Businessman	Señores	Abandonados	Señores	Merged	7th voted out Day 64
Dakota Tárraga; 25, Alicante	Hermano Mayor star	Abandonados	Señores	Abandonados	Merged	8th voted out Day 71
Chelo García-Cortés; 67, Castelldefels	Journalist and television panelist	Piratas	Señores		Forgotten Pirate	9th voted out Day 71
Isabel Pantoja; 62, Medina-Sidonia	Copla singer	Piratas	Abandonados	Señores	Merged	Evacuated; Day 74
Mónica Hoyos; 42, Valencia, Peru	Television host	Piratas	Abandonados	Señores	Merged	10th voted out Day 78
Mahi Masegosa; 29, Granada	Maestros de la Costura 1 semifinalist	Abandonados	Piratas	Abandonados	Forgotten Pirate	11th voted out Day 85
Fabio Colloricchio; 28, Rome, Argentina	Model and influencer	Abandonados	Piratas	Abandonados	Merged	Third Place; Day 85
Albert Álvarez; 30, Soria	Pole vaulter	Señores	Abandonados	Señores	Merged	Runner-up; Day 85
Omar Montes; 30, Carabanchel	Singer	Señores	Piratas	Señores	Merged	Sole Survivor; Day 85

== Nominations ==
	Week 1	Week 2	Week 3	Week 4	Week 5	Week 6	Week 7	Week 8		Week 9	Week 10	Week 11	Week 12	Final		Total votes
Omar	Aneth	Exempt	Exempt	Exempt	Chelo	Chelo	Mónica	Immune	Fabio	Dakota	Mónica	Mónica	Mahi	Nominated	Sole Survivor (Day 85)	1
Albert	Loly	Exempt	Mónica	Mónica	Chelo	Isabel	Mónica	Nominated	Mónica; Violeta	Fabio	Isabel	Fabio	Mahi	Finalist	Runner-up (Day 85)	8
Fabio	Mahi	Dakota	Exempt	Exempt	Lidia	Dakota	Dakota	Nominated	Dakota; Mónica	Colate	Mónica	Mónica	Albert	Nominated	Third Place (Day 85)	6
Mahi	Violeta	Fabio	Exempt	Exempt	Violeta	Violeta	Fabio	Forgotten; Pirate				Mónica	Albert	Eliminated (Day 85)		5
Mónica	Exempt	Toñi	Isabel	Albert	Chelo	Chelo	Albert	Nominated	Colate; Dakota	Exempt	Omar	Isabel	Eliminated (Day 78)			17
Isabel	Exempt	Carlos	Mónica	Albert	Mónica	Colate	Colate	Nominated	Colate; Mónica	Colate	Albert	Mahi	Evacuated (Day 74)			4
Chelo	Exempt	Mónica	Oto	Oto	Mónica	Colate	Forgotten; Pirate					Eliminated (Day 71)				11
Dakota	Violeta	Jonathan	Chelo	Chelo	Violeta	Violeta	Fabio	Nominated	Violeta; Mónica	Albert	Albert	Eliminated (Day 71)				7
Colate	Aneth	Exempt	Aneth	Isabel	Isabel	Chelo	Mónica	Nominated	Violeta; Isabel	Fabio	Eliminated (Day 64)					9
Violeta	Dakota	Mahi	Evacuated (Day 15)	Exempt	Lidia	Oto	Mahi	Nominated	Dakota; Albert	Re-Evacuated (Day 55)						12
Oto	Jonathan	Jonathan	Chelo	Chelo	Violeta	Violeta	Fabio	Nominated	Eliminated (Day 50)							4
Carlos	Exempt	Toñi	Dakota	Oto	Forgotten; Pirate		Eliminated (Day 43)									3
Lidia	Colate	Exempt	Chelo	Carlos	Violeta	Eliminated (Day 36)										1
Jonathan	Dakota	Mahi	Forgotten; Pirate		Eliminated (Day 29)											2
Aneth	Colate	Exempt	Mónica	Eliminated (Day 22)												2
Toñi	Exempt	Carlos	Exempt	Left Competition (Day 18)												2
Encarna	Exempt	Carlos	Exempt	Left Competition (Day 18)												0
Loly	Colate	Forgotten; Pirate	Eliminated (Day 15)													0
Notes	See note 1, 2, 3	See note 1, 4, 5	See note 1, 6, 7, 8, 9	See note 1, 10, 11, 12	See note 13, 14, 15	See note 16, 17	See note 18, 19	See note 20, 21	See note 22	See note 23, 24, 25	See note 26, 27, 28	See note 29, 30, 31	See note 32	See note 33	None	
Nominated by Tribe	Colate; Violeta	Carlos; Jonathan	Chelo; Mónica	Albert; Chelo	Chelo; Violeta	Chelo; Violeta	Fabio; Mónica		Dakota; Mónica; Violeta	Colate; Fabio	Albert	Isabel; Mónica	Mahi			
Nominated by Leader	Jonathan; Loly	Mahi; Mónica	Aneth; Dakota	Carlos; Isabel	Isabel; Lidia	Dakota; Isabel	Colate; Mahi		Fabio	Dakota	Mónica	Fabio	Albert			
Nominated	Colate; Jonathan; Loly; Violeta	Carlos; Jonathan; Mahi; Mónica	Aneth; Chelo; Dakota; Mónica	Albert; Carlos; Chelo; Isabel	Chelo; Isabel; Lidia; Violeta	Chelo; Dakota; Isabel; Violeta	Colate; Fabio; Mahi; Mónica	Albert; Colate; Dakota; Fabio; Isabel; Mónica; Oto; Violeta	Dakota; Fabio; Mónica; ~~Violeta~~	Colate; Dakota; Fabio	Albert; Dakota; Mónica	Fabio; ~~Isabel~~; Mónica	Albert; Mahi	Fabio; Omar	Albert; Omar	
Eliminated	Loly; Fewest votes (out of 3)	Jonathan; Fewest votes (out of 3)	Aneth; Fewest votes (out of 3)	Carlos; Fewest votes (out of 3)	Lidia; Fewest votes (out of 3)	Chelo; Fewest votes (out of 3)	Mahi; Fewest votes (out of 3)	Oto; Fewest votes to save	Mónica; Fewest votes to save	Colate; Fewest votes (out of 2)	Dakota; Fewest votes (out of 2)	Mónica; Fewest votes to save	Mahi; Fewest votes to save	Fabio; Fewest votes to save	Albert; 46.3% to win	
Eliminated	Loly; Fewest votes (out of 3)	Jonathan; Fewest votes (out of 3)	Aneth; Fewest votes (out of 3)	Carlos; Fewest votes (out of 3)	Lidia; Fewest votes (out of 3)	Chelo; Fewest votes (out of 3)	Mahi; Fewest votes (out of 3)	Oto; Fewest votes to save	Mónica; Fewest votes to save	Colate; Fewest votes (out of 2)	Dakota; Fewest votes (out of 2)	Mónica; Fewest votes to save	Mahi; Fewest votes to save	Fabio; Fewest votes to save	Omar; 53.7% to win	
Forgotten Pirate Nominated		Jonathan; Loly	Aneth; Jonathan	Carlos; Jonathan	Carlos; Lidia	Carlos; Chelo		Chelo; Mahi; Oto	Chelo; Mahi; Mónica	Chelo; Colate; Mahi	Chelo; Dakota; Mahi					
Forgotten Pirate Eliminated		Loly; Most votes to eliminate	Aneth; Most votes to eliminate	Jonathan; Most votes to eliminate	Lidia; Most votes to eliminate	Carlos; Most votes to eliminate		Oto; Most votes to eliminate	Mónica; 38% to return	Colate; Most votes to eliminate	Dakota; Most votes to eliminate					
Forgotten Pirate Eliminated		Loly; Most votes to eliminate	Aneth; Most votes to eliminate	Jonathan; Most votes to eliminate	Lidia; Most votes to eliminate	Carlos; Most votes to eliminate		Oto; Most votes to eliminate	Mónica; 38% to return	Colate; Most votes to eliminate	Chelo; Most votes to eliminate					

- Contestant was fake evicted and became a forgotten pirate.
- Contestant was immune
- Contestant was leader and whoever they nominated would automatically face elimination (Immune)
- Contestant was nominated

=== Notes ===
- ^Note 1: Piratas tribe has the privilege of being exempt from nominations.
- ^Note 2: As the leaders of the teams, Albert and Oto were given the power to name a nominee.
- ^Note 3: There was a tie between Dakota and Violeta, and the Piratas tribe broke it nominating Violeta.
- ^Note 4: Loly was fake evicted and was sent to the Forgotten Pirate zone.
- ^Note 5: As the leaders of the teams, Chelo and Violeta were given the power to name a nominee.
- ^Note 6: Jonathan was fake evicted and was sent to the Forgotten Pirate zone.
- ^Note 7: Contestants were split in three new groups decided randomly.
- ^Note 8: As the leaders of the teams, Carlos and Colate were given the power to name a nominee.
- ^Note 9: Violeta was evacuated for medical reasons so she was exempt from nominations. However, on day 18 she came back to the competition and joined Piratas tribe.
- ^Note 10: Aneth was fake evicted and was sent to the Forgotten Pirate zone.
- ^Note 11: As the leaders of the teams, Colate and Lidia were given the power to name a nominee.
- ^Note 12: There was a tie between Chelo and Oto and Lidia, as leader, broke it nominating Chelo.
- ^Note 13: Contestants were split in two new groups decided by age and distributed in new locations.
- ^Note 14: Carlos was fake evicted and was sent to the Forgotten Pirate zone.
- ^Note 15: As the leaders of the teams, Colate and Fabio were given the power to name a nominee.
- ^Note 16: Lidia was fake evicted and was sent to the Forgotten Pirate zone.
- ^Note 17: As the leaders of the teams, Albert and Fabio were given the power to name a nominee.
- ^Note 18: Chelo was fake evicted and was sent to the Forgotten Pirate zone.
- ^Note 19: As the leaders of the teams, Isabel and Violeta were given the power to name a nominee.
- ^Note 20: Mahi was fake evicted and was sent to the Forgotten Pirate zone.
- ^Note 21: Omar was the leader and the rest of contestants were automatically nominated. Oto received the fewest votes to save and was fake evicted and sent to the Forgotten Pirate zone.
- ^Note 22: As the leader of the team, Omar was given the power to name a nominee.
- ^Note 23: Mónica was fake evicted and was sent to the Forgotten Pirate zone.
- ^Note 24: As the leader of the team, Omar was given the power to name a nominee.
- ^Note 25: Mónica was voted to return to the main tribe and for this reason she was exempt from nominations.
- ^Note 26: Colate was fake evicted and was sent to the Forgotten Pirate zone.
- ^Note 27: As the leader of the team, Fabio was given the power to name a nominee.
- ^Note 28: Dakota was automatically nominated due to not following the rules.
- ^Note 29: Dakota was fake evicted and was sent to the Forgotten Pirate zone.
- ^Note 30: As the leader of the team, Albert was given the power to name a nominee.
- ^Note 31: There was a tie between Isabel and Mahi and Albert, as leader, broke it nominating Isabel.
- ^Note 32: As the leader of the team, Fabio was given the power to name a nominee.
- ^Note 33: Albert won the last immunity challenge and went through the final vote. Fabio and Omar were nominated.

== Tribes ==
	Pre-merge tribes			
	Abandonados	Piratas	Señores	Forgotten Pirate
Week 1	Dakota; Fabio; Jonathan; Mahi; Oto; Violeta	Carlos; Chelo; Encarna; Isabel; Mónica; Toñi	Albert; Aneth; Colate; Lidia; Loly; Omar	
Week 2	Dakota; Fabio; Jonathan; Mahi; Oto; Violeta	Albert; Aneth; Colate; Lidia; Omar	Carlos; Chelo; Encarna; Isabel; Mónica; Toñi	Loly
Week 3	Albert; Aneth; Colate; Isabel; Mónica	~~Encarna~~; Fabio; Mahi; Omar; ~~Toñi~~; Violeta	Carlos; Chelo; Dakota; Lidia; Oto	Jonathan
Week 4	Albert; Colate; Isabel; Mónica	Fabio; Mahi; Omar; Violeta	Carlos; Chelo; Dakota; Lidia; Oto	Jonathan
Week 5	Dakota; Fabio; Lidia; Mahi; Oto; Violeta		Albert; Chelo; Colate; Isabel; Mónica; Omar	Carlos
Week 6	Dakota; Fabio; Mahi; Oto; Violeta		Albert; Chelo; Colate; Isabel; Mónica; Omar	Carlos
Week 7	Dakota; Fabio; Mahi; Oto; Violeta		Albert; Colate; Isabel; Mónica; Omar	Chelo

== Ratings ==
=== "Galas" ===
Show N°	Day	Viewers	Ratings share
1 - Launch	Thursday, April 25	4.164.000	36.5%
2	Thursday, May 2	3.207.000	30.1%
3	Thursday, May 9	3.320.000	31.7%
4	Thursday, May 16	3.305.000	31.5%
5	Thursday, May 23	3.337.000	30.3%
6	Thursday, May 30	3.397.000	32.0%
7	Thursday, June 6	3.320.000	32.5%
8	Thursday, June 13	3.697.000	35.7%
9	Thursday, June 20	3.645.000	35.0%
10	Thursday, June 27	3.354.000	33.1%
11	Thursday, July 4	3.211.000	32.9%
12	Thursday, July 11	3.584.000	36.0%
13 - Final	Thursday, July 18	4.103.000	40.6%

=== "Conexión Honduras" ===
Show N°	Day	Viewers	Ratings share
1	Sunday, April 28	1.687.000	19.1%
2	Sunday, May 5	2.977.000	24.0%
3	Sunday, May 12	2.884.000	23.2%
4	Sunday, May 19	2.912.000	23.5%
5	Sunday, May 26	2.444.000	17.6%
6	Sunday, June 2	2.840.000	23.9%
7	Sunday, June 9	2.771.000	23.1%
8	Sunday, June 16	2.911.000	27.4%
9	Sunday, June 23	2.401.000	23.6%
10	Sunday, June 30	2.368.000	22.5%
11	Sunday, July 7	2.645.000	24.1%
12	Sunday, July 14	2.618.000	26.0%

=== "Tierra de Nadie" ===
Show N°	Day	Viewers	Ratings share
1	Tuesday, April 30	2.340.000	19.8%
2	Tuesday, May 7	2.429.000	21.4%
3	Tuesday, May 14	2.086.000	18.3%
4	Tuesday, May 21	2.411.000	21.4%
5	Tuesday, May 28	2.440.000	22.0%
6	Tuesday, June 4	2.559.000	24.0%
7	Tuesday, June 11	2.439.000	21.6%
8	Tuesday, June 18	2.412.000	22.3%
9	Tuesday, June 25	2.579.000	23.3%
10	Tuesday, July 2	2.593.000	25.5%
11	Tuesday, July 9	2.706.000	26.5%
