= Cadavid =

Cadavid is a Galician surname, "probably a topographic name related to cádavo, cádava ‘stump of a burned tree or bush’". Notable people with the surname include:

- Andrés Cadavid (born 1985), Colombian footballer
- Diego Cadavid (born 1978), Colombian actor and cinematographer
- Esmeralda Arboleda Cadavid (1921–1997), Colombian politician
- María Consolación García-Cortés Cadavid (born 1951), known as Chelo García-Cortés, Spanish journalist
- Sarah Cadavid (born 1993), Colombian medical designer
