= Alyson Eckmann =

American TV host and radio broadcaster (born 1990)

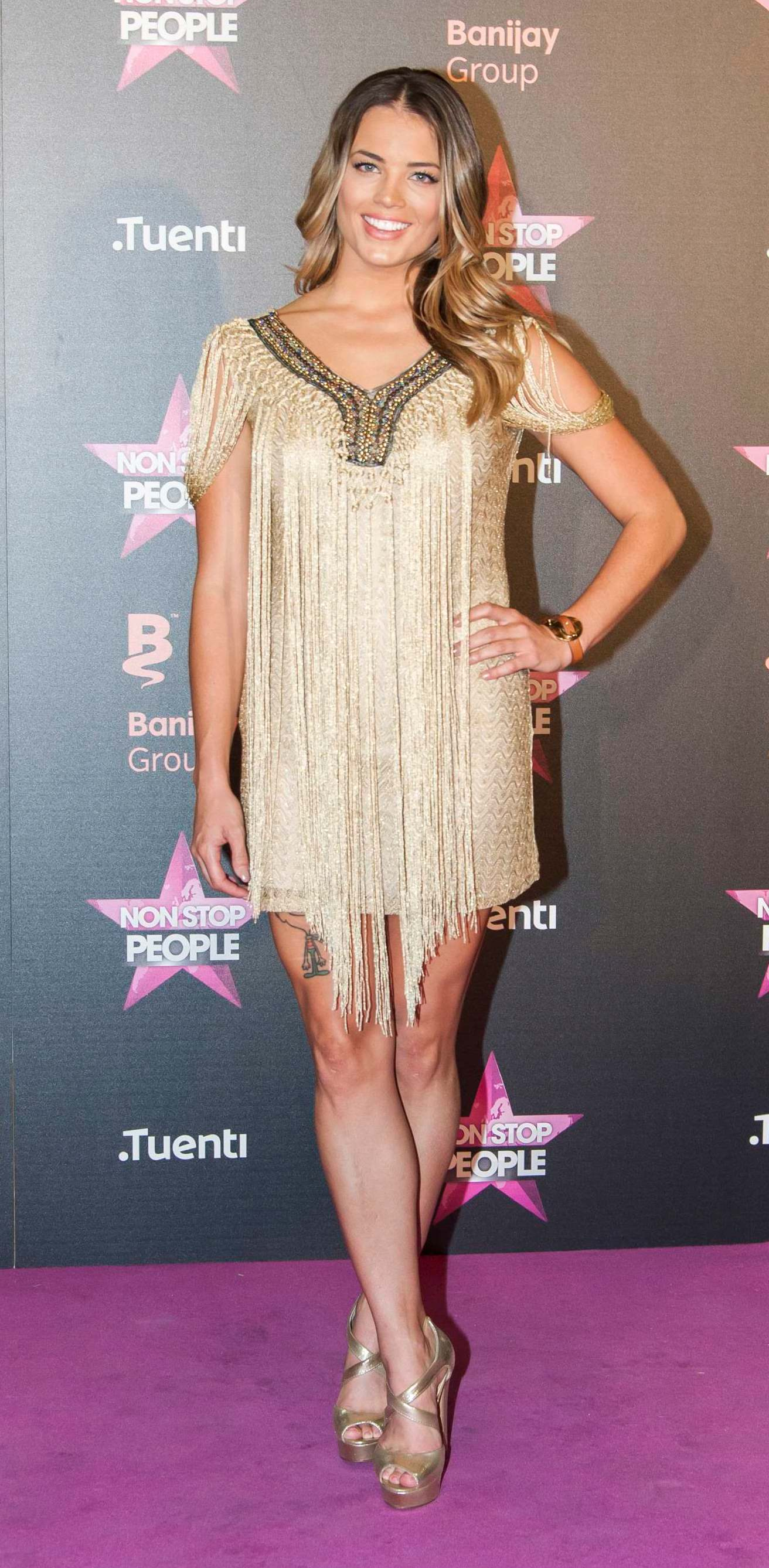
- Eckmann in 2015
- Born: Alyson Rae Eckmann; November 8, 1990 (age 35); Seattle, Washington, United States
- Occupations: Journalist, and radio and TV host

Alyson "Aly" Rae Eckmann (born November 8, 1990) is an American journalist, reporter, TV presenter, radio broadcaster and nude model.

== Early life ==
Eckmann was born in Winthrop, Washington on November 8, 1990, although at the age of eighteen, she moved to Mexico and later, at the age of twenty, she moved to Madrid, Spain. Initially, Eckmann would stay for about ten months, although after finding work as a babysitter she stayed for two more years. After this, Eckmann went on vacation to the Canary Islands where she found the recording of the television program Un príncipe para Corina, with which according to her: "I happened to stumble upon Corina's program, and without really knowing how, I ended up on TV." A casting director actually proposed the idea of participating in Cuatro's dating show. At first she was reluctant to it but finally accepted.

== Career ==
=== Television ===
After this, Eckmann signed for the television program Hable con ellas for the television channel Telecinco, where she became a presenter for the first time, and also works as a reporter. On the other hand, Eckmann also works as an announcer in the radio program No te cortes, from Los 40 Principales.

On October 22, 2014, she started as a reporter for the program Todo va bien de Cuatro. In April 2015, Eckmann made an appearance in the television series La que se avecina, where she starred as Megan Simons, Trevor's wife, Judith's ex-partner. Since 2014, Alyson has collaborated with Vevo Spain presenting the Vevo Fresh program and the DCODE festivals.

In 2015, Eckmann joined Non Stop People, a Movistar+ channel run by and for young people to present the Xtraǃ program. On 29 September 2016, she participated in the game show Sígueme el Rollo on Ten.

On 9 January 2017, she became one of the contestants on the Telecinco reality show Gran Hermano VIP 5. She won the 100,000 euros prize with 58.8% of the audience in her favor.

=== Music ===
Eckmann was the vocalist of a jazz group for 8 years. Later, she composed two singles, one in 2014, called "Believe Me" and another in 2015 titled "Day After Day." She has also participated in various musicals such as Cats, Seussical and Annie.

In 2016, she went to the Antena 3 musical program Tu cara me suena. At the end of that same year, Eckmann collaborated as a vocalist in "Get Over It", a song by Les Castizos that came out to the sold under the music label Clipper's Sounds.

== Filmography ==
Television
Year	Program	Network	Notes
2013	Un príncipe para Corina	Cuatro	Participant
2014	Hable con ellas	Telecinco	Presenter
2014-2015	Todo va bien	Cuatro	Collaborator
2015	Xtra!	Non Stop People	Reporting co-host
2016	Tu cara me suena	Antena 3	Guest
2017	Gran Hermano VIP 5	Telecinco	Contestant and winner
2017	Sábado Deluxe	Telecinco	Guest (2 episodes)
2017	Sálvame	Telecinco	Guest
2017	Me lo dices o me lo cantas	Telecinco	Contestant
2017	Gran Hermano Revolution	Telecinco	Collaborator and guest VIP
2017	Morninglory	Be Mad	Collaborator
2018	Xtra!	Non Stop People	Presenter
2018	Gran Hermano VIP 6	Telecinco	Guest VIP

Radio
Year	Program	Network	Notes
2013-2016	No te cortes	Los 40 principales	Presenter and reporter

Internet
Yeark	Program	Network	Notes
2014-2015	Vevo fresh	VEVO	Presenter
2017	English for Summer	Mtmad	Presenter

Television series
Year	Program	Network	Notes
2015-2016	La que se avecina	Telecinco	Megan Simons (3 episodes)
