= List of number-one singles of 2019 (Spain) =

This lists the singles that reached number one on the Spanish PROMUSICAE sales and airplay charts in 2019. Total sales correspond to the data sent by regular contributors to sales volumes and by digital distributors.

== Chart history ==
Week	Issue date	Top Streaming, Downloads & Physical Sales			Most Airplay		
Week	Issue date	Artist(s)	Song	Ref.	Artist(s)	Song	Ref.
1	January 3	Paulo Londra	"Adán y Eva"		Maroon 5	"Girls Like You"	
2	January 10	Paulo Londra	"Adán y Eva"		Maroon 5	"Girls Like You"	
3	January 17	Paulo Londra	"Adán y Eva"		Beret	"Lo siento"	
4	January 24	Anuel AA and Karol G	"Secreto"		Beret	"Lo siento"	
5	January 31	Anuel AA and Karol G	"Secreto"		Lukas Graham	"Love Someone"	
6	February 7	Anuel AA and Karol G	"Secreto"		Lukas Graham	"Love Someone"	
7	February 14	Daddy Yankee featuring Snow	"Con Calma"		Lukas Graham	"Love Someone"	
8	February 21	Daddy Yankee featuring Snow	"Con Calma"		David Guetta, Bebe Rexha and J Balvin	"Say My Name"	
9	February 28	Daddy Yankee featuring Snow	"Con Calma"		Lukas Graham	"Love Someone"	
10	March 7	Daddy Yankee featuring Snow	"Con Calma"		Ava Max	"Sweet but Psycho"	
11	March 14	Don Patricio and Cruz Cafuné	"Contando lunares"		Lukas Graham	"Love Someone"	
12	March 21	Don Patricio and Cruz Cafuné	"Contando lunares"		Lukas Graham	"Love Someone"	
13	March 28	Don Patricio and Cruz Cafuné	"Contando lunares"		Ava Max	"Sweet but Psycho"	
14	April 4	Rosalía, J Balvin and El Guincho	"Con Altura"		Lukas Graham	"Love Someone"	
15	April 11	Rosalía, J Balvin and El Guincho	"Con Altura"		Ava Max	"Sweet but Psycho"	
16	April 18	Rosalía, J Balvin and El Guincho	"Con Altura"		Lukas Graham	"Love Someone"	
17	April 25	Rosalía, J Balvin and El Guincho	"Con Altura"		Lukas Graham	"Love Someone"	
18	May 2	Rosalía, J Balvin and El Guincho	"Con Altura"		Lukas Graham	"Love Someone"	
19	May 9	Rosalía, J Balvin and El Guincho	"Con Altura"		Mark Ronson featuring Miley Cyrus	"Nothing Breaks Like a Heart"	
20	May 16	Lunay, Daddy Yankee and Bad Bunny	"Soltera" (Remix)		Ava Max	"Sweet but Psycho"	
21	May 23	Lunay, Daddy Yankee and Bad Bunny	"Soltera" (Remix)		Lukas Graham	"Love Someone"	
22	May 30	Sech and Darell	"Otro Trago"		Ed Sheeran and Justin Bieber	"I Don't Care"	
23	June 6	Rosalía	"Aute Cuture"		Ed Sheeran and Justin Bieber	"I Don't Care"	
24	June 13	Bad Bunny and Tainy	"Callaíta"		Lukas Graham	"Love Someone"	
25	June 20	Bad Bunny and Tainy	"Callaíta"		Alejandro Sanz and Camila Cabello	"Mi Persona Favorita"	
26	June 27	Bad Bunny and Tainy	"Callaíta"		Jonas Brothers	"Sucker"	
27	July 4	Bad Bunny and Tainy	"Callaíta"		Morat and Aitana	"Presiento"	
28	July 11	Rosalía	"Milionària"		Morat and Aitana	"Presiento"	
29	July 18	Bad Bunny and Tainy	"Callaíta"		Dvicio and Taburete	"5 Sentidos"	
30	July 25	Anuel AA, Daddy Yankee and Karol G featuring J Balvin and Ozuna	"China"		Ed Sheeran and Justin Bieber	"I Don't Care"	
31	August 1	Anuel AA, Daddy Yankee and Karol G featuring J Balvin and Ozuna	"China"		Manuel Carrasco	"Qué Bonito Es Querer"	
32	August 8	Anuel AA, Daddy Yankee and Karol G featuring J Balvin and Ozuna	"China"		Lewis Capaldi	"Someone You Loved"	
33	August 15	Anuel AA, Daddy Yankee and Karol G featuring J Balvin and Ozuna	"China"		Panic! at the Disco	"High Hopes"	
34	August 22	Anuel AA, Daddy Yankee and Karol G featuring J Balvin and Ozuna	"China"		Morat and Aitana	"Presiento"	
35	August 29	Rosalía and Ozuna	"Yo x Ti, Tú x Mí"		Ed Sheeran and Justin Bieber	"I Don't Care"	
36	September 5	Rosalía and Ozuna	"Yo x Ti, Tú x Mí"		Shawn Mendes and Camila Cabello	"Señorita"	
37	September 12	Rosalía and Ozuna	"Yo x Ti, Tú x Mí"		Shawn Mendes and Camila Cabello	"Señorita"	
38	September 19	Rosalía and Ozuna	"Yo x Ti, Tú x Mí"		Shawn Mendes and Camila Cabello	"Señorita"	
39	September 26	Rosalía and Ozuna	"Yo x Ti, Tú x Mí"		Shawn Mendes and Camila Cabello	"Señorita"	
40	October 3	Anuel AA, Daddy Yankee and Karol G featuring J Balvin and Ozuna	"China"		Shawn Mendes and Camila Cabello	"Señorita"	
41	October 10	Anuel AA, Daddy Yankee and Karol G featuring J Balvin and Ozuna	"China"		Manuel Carrasco	"Qué Bonito Es Querer"	
42	October 17	Anuel AA, Daddy Yankee and Karol G featuring J Balvin and Ozuna	"China"		Lewis Capaldi	"Someone You Loved"	
43	October 24	Anuel AA, Daddy Yankee and Karol G featuring J Balvin and Ozuna	"China"		Shawn Mendes and Camila Cabello	"Señorita"	
44	October 31	Omar Montes and Bad Gyal	"Alocao"		Shawn Mendes and Camila Cabello	"Señorita"	
45	November 7	Omar Montes and Bad Gyal	"Alocao"		Manuel Carrasco	"Qué Bonito Es Querer"	
46	November 14	Omar Montes and Bad Gyal	"Alocao"		Manuel Carrasco	"Qué Bonito Es Querer"	
47	November 21	Omar Montes and Bad Gyal	"Alocao"		Manuel Carrasco	"Qué Bonito Es Querer"	
48	November 28	Omar Montes and Bad Gyal	"Alocao"		Tones and I	"Dance Monkey"	
49	December 5	Karol G and Nicki Minaj	"Tusa"		Tones and I	"Dance Monkey"	
50	December 12	Karol G and Nicki Minaj	"Tusa"		Sinsinati	"Indios y vaqueros"	
51	December 19	Karol G and Nicki Minaj	"Tusa"		Morat	"A dónde vamos"	
52	December 26	Karol G and Nicki Minaj	"Tusa"		Dani Fernández	"Disparos"	
