= Alocao =

2019 single by Omar Montes and Bad Gyal

Single by Omar Montes and Bad Gyal
- Language: Spanish
- Released: 24 October 2019
- Genre: Reggaeton
- Length: 3:28
- Label: Universal
- Songwriters: Bad Gyal; Carlos José Montado Cruz; Jesús Gascón Santana; Omar Montes
- Producer: Chus Santana

Omar Montes singles chronology
"Enamorada" (2019)	"Alocao" (2019)	"Morena" (2019)

Bad Gyal singles chronology
"Hookah" (2019)	"Alocao" (2019)	"Zorra" (2019)

Music video
- "Alocao" on YouTube

"Alocao" is a song recorded by Spanish singers Omar Montes and Bad Gyal. It was released on 24 October 2019 through Universal Music Group. The song debuted at number one in Spain, becoming Montes' and Bad Gyal's first number-one song in the country.

== Critical reception ==
Shaad D'Souza of The Fader described the track as a "a fiery new collaboration" and highlighted Bad Gyal's "dexterous sing-rapping". Skope at Skopemag thought the song was "a beat-driven beauty that’s both irresistibly sexy and heartrendingly melancholy with powerful threads of longing and desire".

== Music video ==
The music video for "Alocao" was released along with the song and it was directed by Fabricio Jiménez. It was shot in Girona, Spain. It shows the singers dancing intimately with each other and features shots of a mansion and a Lamborghini. Bad Gyal is seen wearing different hair styles, both blonde and orange.

== Charts ==
=== Weekly charts ===
Weekly chart performance for "Alocao"
Chart (2019)	Peak position
Nicaragua (Monitor Latino)	13
Nicaragua Urbano (Monitor Latino)	11
Spain (PROMUSICAE)	1

=== Year-end charts ===
2019 year-end chart performance for "Alocao"
Chart (2019)	Position
Spain (PROMUSICAE)	34

2020 year-end chart performance for "Alocao"
Chart (2020)	Position
Spain (PROMUSICAE)	20

== Certifications ==
Region	Certification	Certified units/sales
Spain (Promusicae)	6× Platinum	240,000^{‡}
^{‡} Sales+streaming figures based on certification alone.
