= Gran Hermano VIP season 6 =

Gran Hermano VIP
- Season 6
- Gran Hermano VIP 6 logo
- Presented by: Jorge Javier Vazquez
- No. of days: 99
- No. of housemates: 16
- Winner: Miriam Saavedra
- No. of episodes: 15

Release
- Original network: Telecinco
- Original release: September 13 – December 20, 2018

Season chronology
- ← Previous; Season 5 Next → Season 7

Gran Hermano VIP 6 was the sixth season of the reality television Gran Hermano VIP series. The season was launched on 13 September 2018 on Telecinco. Jorge Javier Vazquez became the new host of the show, continuing his job as host of the last two Civilian seasons. Sandra Barneda has been confirmed to be back as the host of the weekly Debate. The motto of this season is "Who will dare?"

== Housemates ==
The first official housemate of the season, Mónica Hoyos, was announced on August 25 in the TV show Sábado Deluxe. The rest of the housemates were confirmed in later days. In the premiere day, it was announced that some contestants would face people from their past. Oriana would have to live with her ex-boyfriend Tony Spina and Isa Pantoja would have to live with Techi, who she shares an ex-boyfriend with. Also, it was announced that Miriam Saavedra, Mónica's arch-enemy, would enter the house as a housemate on Day 4 at the Debate. On Day 3, Oriana decided to leave the house. On Day 15, Omar Montes, Isa Pantoja's boyfriend, entered the house as a new housemate.

Housemates	Residence	Age	Famous for...	Entered	Exited	Status
Miriam Saavedra	Madrid	24	TV personality	Day 4	Day 99	Winner
Suso Álvarez	Barcelona	25	Gran Hermano 16 housemate	Day 1	Day 99	Runner-up
El Koala	Málaga	49	Musician	Day 1	Day 99	3rd Place
Asraf Beno	Ceuta	22	Model	Day 1	Day 92	12th Evicted
Mónica Hoyos	Madrid	41	Actress and TV host	Day 1	Day 85	11th Evicted
Tony Spina	Girona	29	Reality TV star	Day 1	Day 78	10th Evicted
Aurah Ruiz	Las Palmas	28	MYHYV star	Day 1	Day 71	9th Evicted
Makoke	Madrid	48	TV panelist and model	Day 1	Day 64	8th Evicted
Ángel Garó	Málaga	53	Actor and comedian	Day 1	Day 57	7th Evicted
Verdeliss	Navarra	33	YouTuber	Day 1	Day 50	6th Evicted
Darek Dabrowski	Madrid	38	Model	Day 1	Day 43	5th Evicted
Techi Cabrera	Madrid	33	TV personality	Day 1	Day 36	4th Evicted
Omar Montes	Madrid	30	Singer and boxer	Day 15	Day 29	3rd Evicted
Aramís Fuster	Cádiz	67	Occultist and fortune teller	Day 1	Day 22	2nd Evicted
Isa Pantoja	Sevilla	22	TV personality	Day 1	Day 15	1st Evicted
Oriana Marzoli	Madrid	26	Reality TV star	Day 1	Day 3	Walked

== Nominations table ==
	Week 1	Week 2	Week 3	Week 4	Week 5	Week 6	Week 7	Week 8	Week 9	Week 10	Week 11	Week 12	Week 13 Final	
Head(s) of Household	Darek; Makoke; Verdeliss	Ángel; Verdeliss	Ángel	Darek; Suso	Ángel	Tony	Tony	Asraf	Mónica	Asraf	none			
Miriam	Mónica; Tony; Aurah	Mónica; Techi; Aurah	Suso; Aurah; Makoke	Not eligible	Mónica; Makoke; Aurah	Makoke; Aurah; Mónica	Makoke; Ángel; Mónica	Mónica; Makoke; Tony	Aurah; Asraf; Suso	Mónica; Suso; Tony (1) Mónica	Mónica; Asraf; Suso	No; Nominations	Winner (Day 99)	
Suso	Miriam; Techi; Koala	Aramís; Koala; Miriam	Koala; Verdeliss; Miriam	Miriam; Koala; Verdeliss	Miriam; Koala; Tony	Miriam; Koala; Verdeliss	Miriam; Mónica; Makoke	Miriam; Koala; Makoke	Miriam; Koala; Tony	Miriam; Koala; Tony	Koala; Miriam; Mónica	No; Nominations	Runner-Up (Day 99)	
Koala	Mónica; Aurah; Asraf	Aramís; Mónica; Suso	Makoke; Mónica; Suso	Aurah; Tony; Makoke	Makoke; Aurah; Suso	Makoke; Aurah; Suso	Ángel; Makoke; Mónica	Tony; Makoke; Mónica	Tony; Aurah; Suso	Mónica; Suso; Tony	Asraf; Mónica; Suso	No; Nominations	Third Place (Day 99)	
Asraf	Miriam; Koala; Ángel	Aramís; Miriam; Koala	Makoke; Verdeliss; Miriam	Ángel; Techi; Tony	Verdeliss; Miriam; Makoke	Ángel; Miriam; Verdeliss	Not eligible	Makoke; Tony; Aurah	Tony; Aurah; Miriam	Miriam; Tony; Koala	Miriam; Koala; Mónica	No; Nominations	Evicted (Day 92)	
Mónica	Miriam; Koala; Isa	Miriam; Koala; Aramís	Asraf; Koala; Miriam	Verdeliss; Miriam; Koala	Miriam; Verdeliss; Koala	Miriam; Verdeliss; Koala	(6) Miriam	Koala; Makoke; Tony	Miriam; Koala; Aurah	Miriam; Koala; Tony	Miriam; Koala; Suso	Evicted (Day 85)		
Tony	Miriam; Isa; Koala	Aramís; Koala; Miriam	Techi; Miriam; Darek	Techi; Asraf; Miriam	Koala; Miriam; Suso	Koala; Miriam; Verdeliss	Koala	Koala; Mónica; Miriam	Asraf; Koala; Miriam	Mónica; Koala; Suso	Evicted (Day 78)			
Aurah	Koala; Miriam; Aramís	Aramís; Miriam; Koala	Verdeliss; Miriam; Koala	Koala; Ángel; Asraf	Koala; Miriam; Verdeliss	Miriam; Koala; Verdeliss	Asraf; Ángel; Mónica	Mónica; Koala; Tony	Asraf; Miriam; Koala	Evicted (Day 71)				
Makoke	Koala; Asraf; Miriam	Aramís; Koala; Miriam	Verdeliss; Koala; Miriam	Verdeliss; Asraf; Koala	Miriam; Verdeliss; Asraf	Koala; Miriam; Verdeliss	Miriam; Asraf; Mónica	Koala; Mónica; Miriam	Evicted (Day 64)					
Ángel	Isa; Mónica; Techi	Aramís; Aurah; Asraf	Asraf; Miriam; Verdeliss	Asraf; Mónica; Techi	Miriam; Verdeliss; Darek	Asraf; Miriam; Koala	Asraf; Suso; Aurah	Evicted (Day 57)						
Verdeliss	Suso; Miriam; Koala (3) Miriam	Asraf; Makoke; Suso	Asraf; Aurah; Makoke	Techi; Makoke; Mónica	Asraf; Mónica; Makoke	Makoke; Mónica; Asraf	Evicted (Day 50)							
Darek	Miriam; Isa; Techi	Aramís; Miriam; Koala	Miriam; Verdeliss; Tony	Miriam; Asraf; Koala	Miriam; Koala; Tony	Evicted (Day 43)								
Techi	Suso; Koala; Aramís	Miriam; Aramís; Koala	Miriam; Koala; Verdeliss	Miriam; Verdeliss; Ángel	Evicted (Day 36)									
Omar	Not in House	Exempt	Tony; Darek; Verdeliss	Evicted (Day 29)										
Aramís	Miriam; Koala; Techi	Miriam; Asraf; Mónica	Evicted (Day 22)											
Isa	Miriam; Koala; Ángel	Evicted (Day 15)						Guest (Day 57-58)	Evicted (Day 15)					
Oriana	Walked (Day 3)													
Notes	1, 2	3, 4	4, 5	6	4	4	7	4	4	4, 8	none	9	10	
Nominated (pre-HoH)	Isa; Koala; Miriam; Mónica	Aramís; Koala; Miriam	Koala; Miriam; Omar; Verdeliss	none	Koala; Miriam; Verdeliss	Koala; Makoke; Miriam	none	Koala; Makoke; Mónica	Asraf; Aurah; Miriam	Koala; Miriam; Mónica	none			
Saved (by HoH)	Mónica	none	Koala	none	Verdeliss	Makoke	none	Mónica	Asraf	Mónica	none			
Nominated for eviction	Isa; Koala; Miriam	Aramís; Koala; Miriam	Asraf; Miriam; Omar; Verdeliss	Asraf; Miriam; Techi; Verdeliss	Darek; Koala; Miriam	Koala; Miriam; Verdeliss	Ángel; Asraf; Koala; Miriam	Koala; Makoke; Tony	Aurah; Koala; Miriam	Koala; Miriam; Tony	Koala; Miriam; Mónica	Asraf; Koala; Miriam; Suso	Koala; Miriam; Suso	
Walked	Oriana	none												
Evicted	Isa; 65.4% to evict (out of 2)	Aramís; 65% to evict (out of 2)	Omar; 53.2% to evict (out of 2)	Techi; 75% to evict (out of 2)	Darek; 71% to evict (out of 2)	Verdeliss; 51.2% to evict (out of 2)	Ángel; 51.1% to evict (out of 2)	Makoke; 55.5% to evict (out of 2)	Aurah; 59.5% to evict (out of 2)	Tony; 60% to evict (out of 2)	Mónica; 67% to evict	Asraf; Fewest votes to save	Koala; Fewest votes to win (out of 3)	Suso; 28.9% to win (out of 2)
Evicted	Isa; 65.4% to evict (out of 2)	Aramís; 65% to evict (out of 2)	Omar; 53.2% to evict (out of 2)	Techi; 75% to evict (out of 2)	Darek; 71% to evict (out of 2)	Verdeliss; 51.2% to evict (out of 2)	Ángel; 51.1% to evict (out of 2)	Makoke; 55.5% to evict (out of 2)	Aurah; 59.5% to evict (out of 2)	Tony; 60% to evict (out of 2)	Mónica; 67% to evict	Asraf; Fewest votes to save	Miriam; 71.1% to win (out of 2)	

=== Notes ===
This housemate was the Head of Household.
This housemate was directly nominated for eviction prior to the regular nominations process.
This housemate was granted immunity from nominations.

- ^Note 1 : The public could have the chance via Twitter to give a housemate the power of 3 extra points in the nominations. Verdeliss won the right.
- ^Note 2 : Verdeliss couldn't participate in the HoH competition due to her pregnancy. In order for her to have a chance at the HoH, she had to guess the winning couple. She chose Darek and Makoke. Because she guessed correctly, she was crowned HoH too.
- ^Note 3 : As a new housemate, Omar was exempt from nominations.
- ^Note 4 : The HoH won the power to save one of the nominees and replace him/her with another housemate.
- ^Note 5 : Due to some unfortunate comments, the public was given the chance to decide if Omar should get a direct nomination, by a vote in the app. The audience decided with the 83.7% of the votes that Omar should be nominated.
- ^Note 6 : The HoH won the power to veto a housemate's nominations. They chose Miriam.
- ^Note 7 : On this round, the nominations were different. Each housemate had to pick a ball which had a different way of nominating. Tony won HoH and could automatically nominate a housemate, he chose Koala. Asraf picked a ball that didn't let him nominate. Mónica picked a ball which let her nominate a housemate with 6 points. The rest of balls were ordinary nominations with 3, 2 and 1 point.
- ^Note 8 : Because of the weekly task, Miriam won 1 extra point in nominations.
- ^Note 9 : Lines were opened to vote for the winner. The housemate with fewest votes would be evicted.
- ^Note 10 : Lines were opened to vote for the winner.

== Nominations total received ==
	Week 1	Week 2	Week 3	Week 4	Week 5	Week 6	Week 7	Week 8	Week 9	Week 10	Week 11	Week 12	Final	Total
Miriam	29	18	16	12	21	17	12	5	10	9	8	-	Winner	157
Suso	6	2	4	-	2	1	2	0	2	5	3	-	Runner-Up	27
Koala	19	12	10	8	11	12	-	13	7	7	7	-	Third Place	106
Asraf	3	6	9	10	4	4	8	-	8	-	5	-	Evicted	57
Mónica	8	6	2	3	5	3	6	11	-	10	7	Evicted		61
Tony	2	0	4	3	2	-	-	8	7	6	Evicted			32
Aurah	3	3	4	3	3	4	1	1	8	Evicted				30
Makoke	-	2	8	3	7	9	6	10	Evicted					45
Ángel	2	-	-	6	-	3	7	Evicted						18
Verdeliss	-	-	15	9	10	7	Evicted							41
Darek	-	0	3	-	1	Evicted								4
Techi	5	2	3	9	Evicted									19
Omar	Not in House	-	-	Evicted										0
Aramís	2	27	Evicted											29
Isa	8	Evicted												8
Oriana	Walked													N/A

== Debate: Blind results ==
Week	1stPlace to Evict	2ndPlace to Evict	3rdPlace to Evict	4thPlace to Evict
1	53.4%	29.1%	17.5%	
1	53.4%	30.9%	15.7%	
1	52.7%	33.7%	13.6%	
1	50.9%	35.4%	13.7%	
1	65.4%	34.6%		
2	62.9%	22.7%	14.4%	
2	68.1%	16.8%	15.1%	
2	67.4%	18.4%	14.2%	
2	66.7%	21.4%	11.9%	
3	51.5%	34.6%	8.4%	5.5%
3	52.1%	34.1%	7.4%	6.4%
3	56.2%	43.8%		
3	55.2%	44.8%		
3	53.9%	46.1%		
4	74.0%	16.4%	6.8%	2.8%
4	66.7%	20.9%	9.1%	3.3%
4	66.0%	21.0%	9.6%	3.4%
4	74.1%	25.9%		
4	73.9%	26.1%		
5	70.9%	28.3%	0.8%	
5	72.6%	26.1%	1.3%	
5	71.9%	26.2%	1.9%	
5	70.9%	29.1%		
6	51.7%	39.5%	8.8%	
6	51.8%	37.5%	10.7%	
6	58.1%	41.9%		
6	53.7%	46.3%		
6	51.2%	48.8%		
6	51.8%	48.2%		
7	73.9%	17.5%	5.4%	3.2%
7	64.9%	25.3%	5.9%	3.9%
7	56.1%	22.7%	16.1%	5.1%
7	51.1%	26.4%	22.5%	
7	38.2%	32.9%	28.9%	
7	53.1%	46.9%		
7	52.9%	47.1%		
7	51.8%	48.2%		
7	51.5%	48.5%		
7	51.1%	48.9%		
8	69.8%	26.1%	4.1%	
8	72.6%	23.7%	3.7%	
8	69.7%	26.4%	3.9%	
8	59.1%	37.1%	3.8%	
8	58.7%	37.1%	4.2%	
8	58.5%	41.5%		
8	54.9%	45.1%		
8	55.3%	44.7%		
9	46.5%	45.5%	8.0%	
9	53.6%	38.3%	8.1%	
9	55.5%	35.9%	8.6%	
9	62.4%	37.6%		
9	57.3%	42.7%		
10	65.1%	28.2%	6.7%	
10	64.9%	26.5%	8.6%	
10	66.8%	24.3%	8.9%	
10	72.2%	27.8%		
10	67.6%	32.4%		
10	60.9%	39.1%		
11	73.8%	15.8%	10.4%	
11	71.6%	17.0%	11.4%	
11	67.4%	21.3%	11.3%	
11	67.1%	18.3%	14.6%	
12	63.6%	29.4%	6.1%	0.9%
12	65.4%	26.6%	6.7%	1.3%
13	67.3%	25.8%	6.9%	
13	68.1%	25.3%	6.6%	

== Ratings ==
=== "Galas" ===
Show N°	Day	Viewers	Ratings share
1 – Launch	Thursday, September 13	2.473.000	24.9%
2	Thursday, September 20	2.872.000	28.4%
3	Thursday, September 27	3.202.000	31.1%
4	Thursday, October 4	2.922.000	29.5%
5	Thursday, October 11	3.286.000	29.8%
6	Thursday, October 18	3.087.000	29.4%
7	Thursday, October 25	2.969.000	29.1%
8	Thursday, November 1	3.429.000	32.1%
9	Thursday, November 8	3.281.000	31.0%
10	Thursday, November 15	3.361.000	31.5%
11	Thursday, November 22	3.097.000	29.3%
12	Thursday, November 29	3.243.000	30.2%
13	Thursday, December 6	3.188.000	29.4%
14	Thursday, December 13	2.779.000	26.5%
15 – Final	Thursday, December 20	3.649.000	32.6%

=== "Debates" ===
Show N°	Day	Viewers	Ratings share
1	Sunday, September 16	2.220.000	18.3%
2	Sunday, September 23	2.155.000	17.8%
3	Sunday, September 30	2.385.000	19.8%
4	Sunday, October 7	2.209.000	18.1%
5	Sunday, October 14	2.224.000	17.9%
6	Sunday, October 21	2.327.000	17.4%
7	Sunday, October 28	2.082.000	17.0%
8	Sunday, November 4	2.369.000	18.4%
9	Sunday, November 11	2.325.000	18.1%
10	Sunday, November 18	2.636.000	23.1%
11	Sunday, November 25	2.261.000	17.4%
12	Sunday, December 2	2.406.000	19.0%
13	Sunday, December 9	2.421.000	19.3%
14	Sunday, December 16	2.195.000	17.9%
15	Sunday, December 23	2.197.000	17.4%

=== "Límite 48H" ===
Show N°	Day	Viewers	Ratings share
1	Tuesday, September 18	2.245.000	22.5%
2	Tuesday, September 25	2.284.000	22.2%
3	Tuesday, October 2	2.648.000	26.2%
4	Tuesday, October 9	2.659.000	25.9%
5	Tuesday, October 16	2.888.000	27.9%
6	Tuesday, October 23	2.542.000	25.3%
7	Tuesday, October 30	2.792.000	27.8%
8	Tuesday, November 6	2.781.000	26.6%
9	Tuesday, November 13	2.804.000	27.1%
10	Tuesday, November 20	2.770.000	26.9%
11	Tuesday, November 27	2.665.000	25.7%
