= Gran Hermano VIP season 5 =

Gran Hermano VIP
- Season 5
- Presented by: Jordi González
- No. of days: 96
- No. of housemates: 15
- Winner: Alyson Eckmann
- Runner-up: Daniela Blume
- No. of episodes: 17

Release
- Original network: Telecinco
- Original release: January 8 – April 13, 2017

Season chronology
- ← Previous; Season 4 Next → Season 6

Gran Hermano VIP 5 was the fifth season of the reality television Gran Hermano VIP series. The series was launched in January 2017 on Telecinco. Jordi González returned to host the series, as Sandra Barneda has been confirmed to be back as the host of the weekly Debate. Also, Lara Álvarez would be back to co-host directly from the house. The season premiered the 8th of January. The motto of this season is Enter as you can.

== Housemates ==
The first official housemates of the season were announced on the 28 of December, artist representative Toño Sanchís and host Irma Soriano. The rest of the housemates were confirmed in later days. In the first gala, they announced Tutto Duran, a former professional football player who now works as a glazier and has a passion for singing and songwriting, trying to break into the music scene. With the help of Alejandro Abad, he has to make the other housemates believe he's a Grammy nominated songwriter and a chart topper reggaeton artist in Latin America. On 19 February, Aida Nizar entered the house as a new housemate. On Day 50, a public poll was made in order for the public to decide if, Aylén Milla, Marco's girlfriend, should enter the game as a contestant.

Housemates	Age	Residence	Famous for being...	Entered	Exited
Alyson Eckmann	26	Madrid	Radio broadcaster and TV host	Day 1	Day 96
Daniela Blume	31	Barcelona	Sexologist & radio host	Day 1	Day 96
Irma Soriano	53	Torrelodones	TV host	Day 1	Day 92
Elettra Lamborghini	22	Milan	TV personality, Lamborghini granddaughter	Day 1	Day 89
Emma Ozores	55	Madrid	Actress	Day 1	Day 89
Marco Ferri	28	Miami	Reality TV star	Day 1	Day 82
Aylén Milla	27	Santiago de Chile	Fashion blogger, reality TV star	Day 50	Day 75
Aída Nízar	41	Valladolid	Gran Hermano 5 housemate	Day 47	Day 68
Aída Nízar	41	Valladolid	Gran Hermano 5 housemate	Day 19	Day 33
Ivonne Reyes	49	Madrid	Actress, TV host & model	Day 1	Day 61
Sergio Ayala	25	Medina del Campo	PP councilor and model	Day 1	Day 54
Alejandro Abad	54	Barcelona	Singer-songwriter and music producer	Day 1	Day 47
Aless Gibaja	28	La Moraleja	Internet celebrity	Day 1	Day 40
Alonso Caparrós	46	Madrid	TV host	Day 1	Day 26
Tutto Durán	32	Las Palmas	Singer-songwriter (False VIP)	Day 1	Day 19
Toño Sanchís	43	Madrid	Talent agent & singer	Day 1	Day 12
Guest(s)
Contestant	Age	Residence	Occupation	Entered	Exited
Antônio & Manoel Rafaski	23	Vitória, Brazil	Entertainment promoters	Day 68	Day 75

== Nominations table ==
	Week 1	Week 2	Week 3	Week 4	Week 5	Week 6	Week 7	Week 8	Week 9	Week 10	Week 11	Week 12	Week 13 Final	
	Week 1	Week 2	Week 3	Week 4	Week 5	Week 6	Week 7	Week 8	Week 9	Week 10	Week 11	Week 12	Day 92	Day 96
Alyson	Toño; Alejandro; Tutto	Alejandro; Emma; Irma	Alonso; Elettra; Sergio	Not eligible	No; Nominations	Alejandro; Sergio; Emma	Sergio	Ivonne; Emma; Daniela	Daniela; Aylén; Aída	Daniela; Aylén; Marco	Marco; Daniela; Emma	No; Nominations	No; Nominations	Winner (Day 96)
Daniela	Toño; Alejandro; Alonso	Alejandro; Alonso; Emma	Emma; Marco; Irma	Not eligible	No; Nominations	Alejandro; Irma; Ivonne	Irma; Alyson; Ivonne	Elettra; Irma; Alyson	Irma; Alyson; Aylén	Alyson; Emma; Irma	Emma; Alyson; Irma	No; Nominations	No; Nominations	Runner-up (Day 96)
Irma	Toño; Marco; Tutto	Tutto; Alejandro; Alonso	Alonso; Elettra; Marco	Not eligible	No; Nominations	Alejandro; Marco; Ivonne	Daniela; Emma; Elettra	Daniela; Elettra; Alyson	Aída; Daniela; Aylén	Daniela; Aylén; Marco	Daniela; Marco; Alyson	No; Nominations	No; Nominations	Evicted (Day 92)
Elettra	Tutto; Toño; Alonso	Alejandro; Alonso; Tutto	Alyson; Irma; Alonso	Aída; Irma; Alejandro	No; Nominations	Alejandro; Sergio; Ivonne	Ivonne; Irma; Marco	Ivonne; Daniela; Irma	Aída; Aylén; Emma	Marco; Aylén; Daniela	Marco; Daniela; Irma	No; Nominations	Evicted (Day 89)	
Emma	Toño; Marco; Tutto	Tutto; Marco; Sergio	Alonso; Alyson; Daniela	Aída; Marco; Daniela	No; Nominations	Alejandro; Marco; Sergio	Marco; Irma; Ivonne	Alyson; Marco; Daniela	Aída; Alyson; Elettra	Daniela; Marco; Alyson	Daniela; Marco; Alyson	No; Nominations	Evicted (Day 89)	
Marco	Toño; Emma; Irma	Alejandro; Alonso; Emma	Irma; Emma; Alonso	Irma; Emma; Aída	No; Nominations	Alejandro; Emma; Irma	Irma; Emma; Elettra	Emma; Irma; Ivonne	Aída; Elettra; Irma	Emma; Irma; Elettra	Alyson; Emma; Irma	Evicted (Day 82)		
Aylén	Not in House						Guest	Nominated	Elettra; Irma; Alyson	Not eligible	Evicted (Day 75)			
Aída	Not in House		Exempt	Not eligible	Evicted (Day 33)		Exempt	Elettra; Irma; Emma	Irma; Elettra; Emma	Re-evicted (Day 68)				
Ivonne	Toño; Tutto; Alejandro	Tutto; Alonso; Alejandro	Alejandro	Aída; Alejandro; Daniela	No; Nominations	Alejandro; Emma; Elettra	Elettra; Daniela; Emma	Elettra; Alyson; Marco	Evicted (Day 61)					
Sergio	Alejandro; Toño; Tutto	Irma; Alejandro; Alonso	Irma; Alyson; Alonso	Alyson; Alejandro; Aída	No; Nominations	Elettra; Alyson; Alejandro	Elettra; Irma; Alyson	Evicted (Day 54)						
Alejandro	Elettra; Ivonne; Marco	Daniela; Elettra; Marco	Daniela; Marco; Elettra	Daniela; Ivonne; Alyson	No; Nominations	Irma; Elettra; Alyson	Evicted (Day 47)							
Aless	Toño; Tutto; Alonso	Tutto; Alonso; Alejandro	Alonso; Alyson; Emma	Not eligible	No; Nominations	Evicted (Day 40)								
Alonso	Toño; Elettra; Marco	Emma; Ivonne; Marco	Elettra; Daniela; Ivonne	Evicted (Day 26)										
Tutto	Ivonne; Elettra; Aless	Daniela; Ivonne; Sergio	Evicted (Day 19)											
Toño	Ivonne; Elettra; Marco	Evicted (Day 12)												
Nomination notes	None	1	2, 3	4	5	6	2, 7	8, 9	10	11	12	13	14	
Nominated for eviction	Elettra; Toño; Tutto	Alonso; Emma; Tutto	Alejandro; Alonso; Alyson; Irma	Aída; Alejandro; Daniela; Irma	Alejandro; Aless; Alyson; Daniela; Elettra; Emma; Irma; Ivonne; Marco; Sergio	Alejandro; Elettra; Emma; Sergio	Daniela; Elettra; Emma; Irma; Ivonne; Sergio	Aylén	Aída; Aylén; Elettra	Aylén; Daniela; Marco	Alyson; Daniela; Marco	Alyson; Daniela; Elettra; Emma; Irma	Alyson; Daniela; Irma	Alyson; Daniela
Nominated for eviction	Elettra; Toño; Tutto	Alonso; Emma; Tutto	Alejandro; Alonso; Alyson; Irma	Aída; Alejandro; Daniela; Irma	Alejandro; Aless; Alyson; Daniela; Elettra; Emma; Irma; Ivonne; Marco; Sergio	Alejandro; Elettra; Emma; Sergio	Daniela; Elettra; Emma; Irma; Ivonne; Sergio	Alyson; Daniela; Elettra; Irma; Ivonne	Aída; Aylén; Elettra	Aylén; Daniela; Marco	Alyson; Daniela; Marco	Alyson; Daniela; Elettra; Emma; Irma	Alyson; Daniela; Irma	Alyson; Daniela
Evicted	Toño; 75.97% to evict (out of 2)	Tutto; Most votes to evict	Alonso; 53.3% to evict (out of 2)	Aída; 69.69% to evict (out of 2)	Aless; 51.5% to evict (out of 2)	Alejandro; 50.2% to evict (out of 2)	Sergio; 56.5% to evict	Aylén; 53% to enter	Aída; 65.1% to evict (out of 2)	Aylén; Most votes to evict (out of 2)	Marco; 54.3% to evict (out of 2)	Elettra; Fewest votes to save (out of 4)	Irma; Fewest votes to save	Daniela; 41.92% to win
Evicted	Toño; 75.97% to evict (out of 2)	Tutto; Most votes to evict	Alonso; 53.3% to evict (out of 2)	Aída; 69.69% to evict (out of 2)	Aless; 51.5% to evict (out of 2)	Alejandro; 50.2% to evict (out of 2)	Sergio; 56.5% to evict	Ivonne; 54.6% to evict	Aída; 65.1% to evict (out of 2)	Aylén; Most votes to evict (out of 2)	Marco; 54.3% to evict (out of 2)	Emma; Fewest votes to save (out of 5)	Irma; Fewest votes to save	Alyson; 58.08% to win

=== Notes ===
This housemate was directly nominated for eviction prior to the regular nominations process.
This housemate was granted immunity from nominations.
This housemate won the right to directly nominate a housemate.

- ^Note 1: Because of the weekly task, Tutto won the right to save a nominee. He saved Alejandro.
- ^Note 2: As a new housemate, Aída could not be nominated.
- ^Note 3: Because of the weekly task, Ivonne won the right to directly nominate a housemate. She chose Alejandro.
- ^Note 4: This week there were two teams, Red team (Alejandro, Elettra, Emma, Ivonne, Marco and Sergio) and Black team (Aída, Aless, Alyson, Daniela and Irma) and the winning team in a task would win the privilege to nominate. Red team won it and was able to nominate.
- ^Note 5: This week there were no nominations due to all housemates facing eviction as a punishment for their behaviour throughout the week.
- ^Note 6: This week, housemates were split in two teams, Red team (Alejandro, Alyson, Daniela, Elettra, Irma) and Black team (Emma, Ivonne, Marco and Sergio) and the winning team in a task would win the privilege to save a nominee. Red team won it and saved Irma.
- ^Note 7: Because of the weekly task, Alyson won the right to directly nominate a housemate. She chose Sergio.
- ^Note 8: Because of the weekly task, Aída won the immunity.
- ^Note 9: On the Debate show, the public could vote to decide if Aylén could enter as a new housemate.
- ^Note 10: On this round, the housemate's relatives nominated. Because of the weekly task, there were two groups, Aliens (Aída and Daniela) and Humans (Alyson, Aylén, Elettra, Emma, Irma and Marco) and Humans won the privilege of saving a nominated housemate. Humans group's relatives saved Irma.
- ^Note 11: Because of the weekly task, Alyson won the right to avoid a housemate's nominations. She chose Aylén.
- ^Note 12: Because of the weekly task, Elettra won immunity in the nominations.
- ^Note 13: Lines were opened to vote for the winner. The two housemates with fewest votes would be evicted.
- ^Note 14: Lines were opened to vote for the winner.

== Nominations total received ==
	Week 1	Week 2	Week 3	Week 4	Week 5	Week 6	Week 7	Week 8	Week 9	Week 10	Week 11	Week 12	Final	Total
Alyson	0	0	9	4	-	3	3	7	5	4	7	-	Winner	42
Daniela	0	6	6	5	-	0	5	7	5	10	10	-	Runner-up	54
Irma	1	4	9	5	-	6	12	7	9	3	3	-	Evicted	59
Elettra	9	2	8	0	-	6	8	11	8	1	-	-	Evicted	53
Emma	2	7	6	2	-	5	5	6	2	5	6	-	Evicted	46
Marco	7	4	5	2	-	4	4	3	0	7	10	Evicted		46
Aylén	Not in House						-	-	6	6	Evicted			12
Aída	Not in House		-	11	Evicted		-	-	13	Re-evicted				24
Ivonne	8	4	1	2	-	3	5	7	Evicted					30
Sergio	0	2	1	0	-	5	-	Evicted						8
Alejandro	8	18	-	5	-	22	Evicted							53
Aless	1	0	0	0	-	Evicted								1
Alonso	3	12	15	Evicted										30
Tutto	11	13	Evicted											24
Toño	28	Evicted												28

== Debate: Blind results ==
Week	1stPlace to Evict	2ndPlace to Evict	3rdPlace to Evict	4thPlace to Evict	5thPlace to Evict	6thPlace to Evict	7thPlace to Evict	8thPlace to Evict	9thPlace to Evict	10thPlace to Evict
1	76.03%	18.66%	5.31%							
1	71.6%	23.1%	5.3%							
1	72.0%	22.5%	5.5%							
1	69.8%	24.8%	5.4%							
1	70.9%	23.2%	5.9%							
2	45.5%	39.6%	14.9%							
2	48.9%	36.7%	14.4%							
2	48.55%	37.6%	13.85%							
3	61.9%	20.2%	10.4%	7.5%						
4	43.2%	42.2%	12.0%	2.6%						
4	44.6%	37.5%	14.5%	3.4%						
4	59.7%	21.3%	15.1%	3.9%						
4	70.8%	29.2%								
5	35.7%	28.2%	27.9%	3.2%	1.4%	1.0%	0.9%	0.7%	0.6%	0.4%
5	32.0%	30.5%	30.1%	3.0%	1.3%	0.9%	0.8%	0.6%	0.4%	0.4%
5	38.6%	37.0%	19.8%	1.7%	0.7%	0.6%	0.6%	0.5%	0.3%	0.2%
5	39.5%	34.6%	25.9%							
6	67.1%	24.2%	6.8%	1.9%						
6	64.2%	26.8%	6.5%	2.5%						
6	49.8%	45.0%	3.1%	2.1%						
6	50.5%	49.5%								
7	60.2%	29.1%	5.0%	2.6%	1.8%	1.3%				
7	57.8%	30.6%	5.4%	2.6%	2.2%	1.4%				
7	54.7%	34.9%	4.4%	2.9%	2.1%	1.0%				
8	71.5%	13.4%	6.5%	5.4%	3.3%					
8	63.9%	17.2%	7.3%	7.3%	4.3%					
8	57.7%	25.5%	7.2%	5.7%	3.9%					
8	57.0%	24.6%	7.5%	5.6%	5.3%					
9	73.0%	24.7%	2.3%							
9	70.4%	27.1%	2.5%							
9	64.2%	35.8%								
10	79.4%	12.9%	7.7%							
10	59.1%	31.6%	9.3%							
10	56.9%	34.8%	8.3%							
10	51.7%	48.3%								
11	58.5%	34.1%	7.4%							
11	55.1%	44.9%								
11	54.4%	45.6%								
12	33.9%	29.1%	22.1%	14.1%	0.8%					
13	44.7%	38.5%	16.8%							
13	46.5%	38.6%	14.9%							
13	55.1%	44.9%								
13	57.1%	42.9%								
13	57.4%	42.6%								
13	57.7%	42.3%								

== Repechage ==
The public voting will decide the top ex-housemates to officially return to the Gran Hermano VIP house as official housemates.

The repechage was officially announced on Day 40 (February 16, 2017). All the evicted housemates (Toño, Tutto, Alonso, Aída and Aless) are up for returning to the house.

Ex-housemate	%	Elimination's Day
Aída Nízar	50%	Gala February 23, 2017
Tutto Durán	N/A	Gala February 23, 2017
Alonso Caparrós	N/A	Gala February 23, 2017
Toño Sanchís	N/A	Gala February 23, 2017
Aless Gibaja	N/A	Debate February 19, 2017

== Ratings ==
=== "Galas" ===
Show N°	Day	Viewers	Ratings share
1 - Launch	Sunday, January 8	2.261.000	17.4%
2	Tuesday, January 10	1.769.000	14.1%
3	Thursday, January 12	2.175.000	17.9%
4	Thursday, January 19	2.125.000	17.7%
5	Thursday, January 26	1.911.000	16.2%
6	Thursday, February 2	2.152.000	18.2%
7	Thursday, February 9	2.297.000	20.2%
8	Thursday, February 16	2.053.000	17.9%
9	Thursday, February 23	1.937.000	17.3%
10	Thursday, March 2	2.097.000	18.2%
11	Thursday, March 9	2.058.000	18.9%
12	Thursday, March 16	2.010.000	17.9%
13	Thursday, March 23	2.171.000	19.7%
14	Thursday, March 30	2.109.000	19.0%
15	Thursday, April 6	2.123.000	18.5%
16	Sunday, April 9	2.198.000	18.3%
17 - Final	Thursday, April 13	2.157.000	21.3%

=== "Debates" ===
Show N°	Day	Viewers	Ratings share
1	Sunday, January 15	1.861.000	14.5%
2	Sunday, January 22	1.791.000	13.5%
3	Sunday, January 29	1.791.000	14.0%
4	Sunday, February 5	1.818.000	14.5%
5	Sunday, February 12	1.818.000	14.5%
6	Sunday, February 19	1.739.000	13.8%
7	Sunday, February 26	1.927.000	15.4%
8	Sunday, March 5	1.712.000	13.9%
9	Sunday, March 12	1.755.000	14.6%
10	Sunday, March 19	1.686.000	14.6%
11	Sunday, March 26	1.835.000	14.1%
12	Sunday, April 2	1.777.000	14.6%
