= Ivonne Reyes =

Venezuelan actress and TV presenter (born 1967)

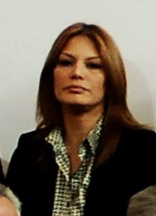
- Ivonne Reyes (2015)
- Born: Ivonne Dayanna Reyes Torres; 8 October 1967 (age 58); Valencia, Venezuela
- Other name: Ivonne Reyes
- Occupations: Television presenter, model, actress
- Spouse: Micky Mata (divorced)
- Children: Alejandro (b. 2000)
- Parent(s): Saúl Vicente Reyes González; Francisca Elena Torres
- Website: http://www.ivonnereyes.com/

Ivonne Reyes (born October 8, 1967 in Valencia, Venezuela) is a Venezuelan actress and TV presenter.

== Career ==
She started as a model and she went later to Miami and finally to Spain, where she became a celebrity thanks to TV programs like the quiz show El precio justo, or soap operas like Hechizo de Amor or La verdad de Laura. She has also taken part in movies like La sal de la vida and Muchacho solitario. On April 3, 2000, she had her first child, Alejandro.

She has a son born April, 2000 that after a paternity lawsuit was legally declared to be son of journalist Pepe Navarro.

In 2007 she was a contestant in the dancing show Mira quien baila.

In 2017, she was a contestant in the fifth edition of reality show Gran Hermano VIP.

== Actress ==
=== TV series ===
- Quién da la vez (1995), Antena 3.
- Este es mi barrio (1996), Antena 3.
- La verdad de Laura (2002), TVE.

=== Film ===
- Los pájaros se van con la muerte (2011)
- Santiago Apóstol (2016)

== TV presenter ==
- El precio justo (1991–1992), TVE, with Joaquín Prat.
- Todo por la pasta (1993), Antena 3, with Sancho Gracia.
- La batalla de las estrellas (1993–1994), Telecinco, with Bertín Osborne.
- Ta tocao (1994), Antena 3.
- El gran juego de la oca (1994–1995), Antena 3, with Pepe Navarro.
- La noche prohibida (1996), Antena 3, with José Coronado and Enrique del Pozo.
- El verano de tu vida (2005), TVE, with Jorge Fernández and Miguel Nadal.
- ¡Hagamos el humor! (2005), Canal Sur, with Guillermo Summers.
- Verano de campeones (2007), Antena 3
- Tensión sin límite (2011), Veo Televisión
