= El Koala =

Spanish musician

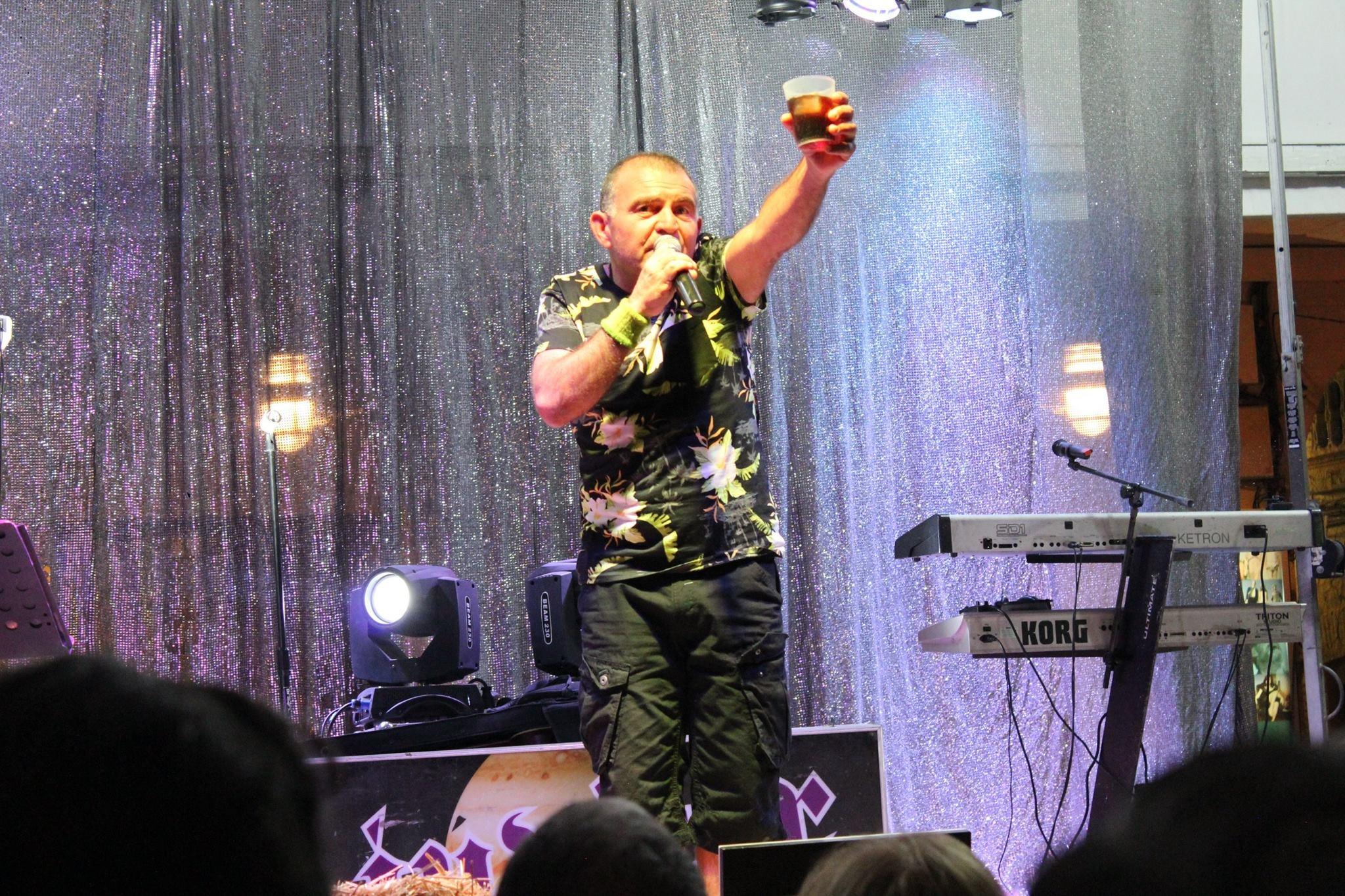
El Koala, 2016

Jesús Manuel Rodríguez, also known as El Koala (October 15, 1969) (Spanish for "the koala"), is a Spanish musician.

He started in the music world in 1986, creating a punk-rock group called "Santos Putos". Later he got involved in several projects, including "Los Ducati" music group. In 2006 he released his first music disc as El Koala, titled Rock Rústico de Lomo Ancho ("Wide loin rustic rock"). Its first single video clip, Opá, yo viazé un corrá, is one of the most ever viewed videos at YouTube, with more than 2 million views only in the first month after its release, currently more than 22.9 million views (April 12, 2014). A new version of the song, under the title Opá, vamo a por el mundiá, is used by the Spanish television station La Sexta to advertise its World Cup programmes.

El Koala has defined a new musical concept: "rustic rock music", in which simple style typical of country life lyrics got mixed with rock and pop melodies.
