= Chelo García-Cortés =

Spanish journalist (born 1951)

- Born: Maria Consolación García-Cortés Cadavid; 3 December 1951 (age 74); Ourense, Galicia, Spain
- Education: Autonomous University of Barcelona
- Occupation: Journalist
- Spouse: Marta Roca Carbonell (2005–present)
- Partner: José Manuel Parada (1974–1984)

María Consolación "Chelo" García-Cortés Cadavid (born 3 December 1951) is a Spanish journalist who has spent most of her professional career in the field of celebrity gossip (Spanish: la prensa del corazón, lit. 'the press of the heart').

== Early life and career ==
Although born in Ourense in 1951, at the early age of three months, she moved to live with her family in Madrid, returning to Galicia at age sixteen. Currently, she is living in Castelldefels, where she has resided for many years. She spends summers at her house in Ibiza.

García-Cortés graduated in Journalism from the Faculty of Information Sciences of the Autonomous University of Barcelona. She took her first professional steps in 1973 when she started working for La Voz del Miño, a syndicated radio station in her native Ourense, while performing social service, and from there moved to Radio Popular, also in Ourense.

In 1975, she was signed by Radio Miramar in Barcelona (where she moved to live), then directed by Marcelino Rodríguez de Castro. From that moment she began working in celebrity gossip, and published her first report in 1976 for the magazine ¡Hola! She was a longtime correspondent for the magazine Diez Minutos in Barcelona, where she had a page called "Por las Ramblas". She also contributed to the magazine Papillón, where she published the first male nude photograph in Spain, of the actor Joan Llaneras. Later she was hired by Cadena Catalana, where she collaborated with Paco Lobatón, until COPE (Radio Popular) required her for its morning show, next to Antonio Herrero.

Building on her experience in radio and print, García-Cortés made her television debut in 1997 with Jordi González on the TV3 program Les 1000 and one (though she had previously participated in some television programs in Catalonia). Between 1998 and 2004 she also worked on Ana Rosa Quintana's show Sabor a ti on Antena 3. In addition, she wrote for the magazine Lecturas and appeared on the radio with Cristina López Schlichting on COPE's La Tarde con Cristina, and later with Isabel Gemio on Te doy mi palabra on Onda Cero.

However, she is best known for the gossip talk show DEC (also known as ¿Dónde estás corazón?) hosted by Jaime Cantizano on Antena 3 from 2003 to 2011. In 2011 she joined Telecinco, after 13 years with its competitor Antena 3, where she appears on programs like Sálvame Diario and Sábado Deluxe (2011–present), La noria (2011–2012), and Abre los ojos y mira (2013).

Apart from her television work, García-Cortés regularly writes for the publications ¡Hola! and Semana.

Together with fellow journalist Jesús Locampos, she wrote the book Yo Acuso, published in 2008 by Grand Guignol. In it, she performs a self-critique of the tabloid press.

== Personal life ==
Chelo García-Cortés's mother died in 1962, when she was only eleven, and she was raised by her father, Rafael García-Cortés Alonso (1916–2001). She has one brother, Mariano García-Cortés Cadavid, who is a photographer. From 1974 to 1984, she was in a relationship with TV presenter José Manuel Parada. She has been married to Marta Roca Carbonell since 8 August 2005. She has declared herself to be openly bisexual.
