= Palau Sant Jordi =

Multi-purpose indoor arena in Barcelona, Spain

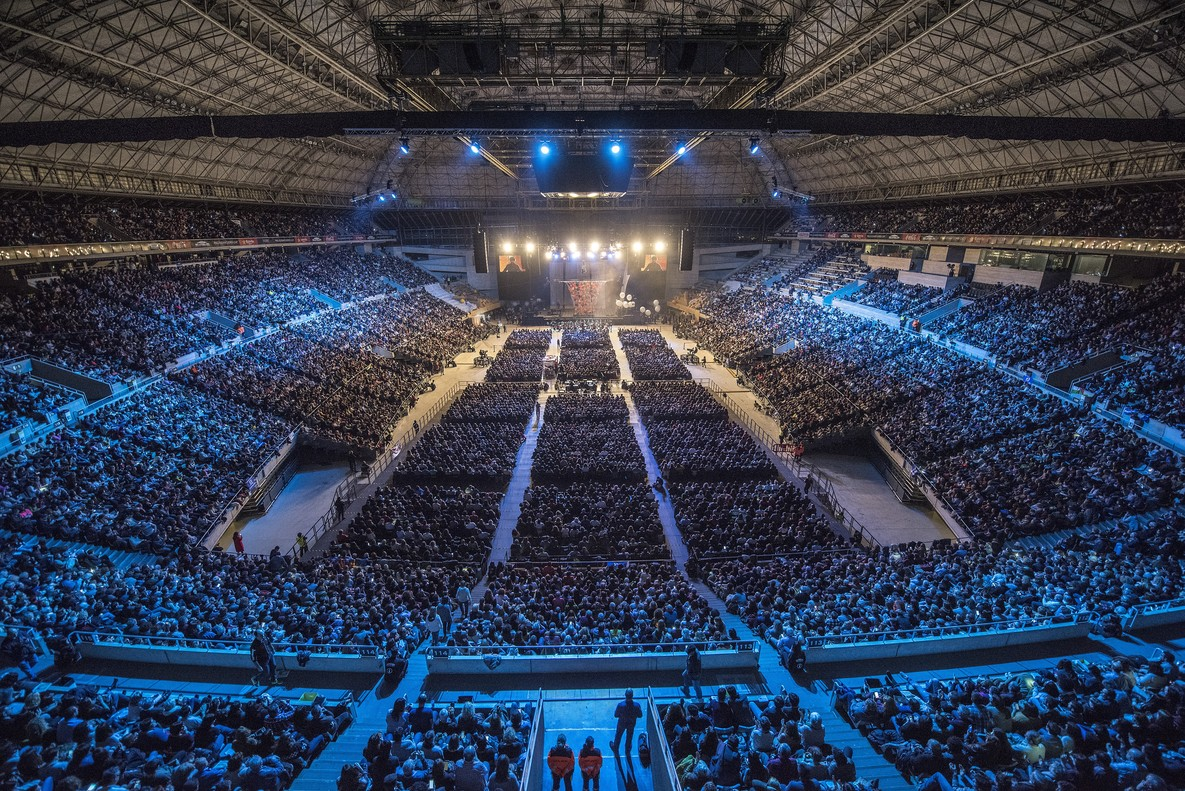
- The Palau Sant Jordi in 2017
- Interactive map of Palau Sant Jordi
- Location: Passeig Olímpic, 5-7, 08038 Barcelona
- Coordinates: 41°21′48.2″N 2°09′09.2″E
- Owner: Barcelona City Council
- Operator: Barcelona de Serveis Municipals (B:SM)
- Capacity: 17,960 (Main Hall); 3,000 (Sant Jordi Club)
- Surface: Parquet

Construction
- Groundbreaking: 1986
- Built: 1986–90
- Opened: 1990
- Renovated: 2014
- Expanded: 2009 (temporary) (architect: Nussli Group)
- Cost: €54 million
- Architects: Arata Isozaki and Mamoru Kawaguchi

Tenant
- FC Barcelona Bàsquet (1990–1992)

Website
- Official website

The Palau Sant Jordi (Catalan pronunciation: [pəˈlaw ˈsaɲ ˈʒɔɾði], English: St. George's Palace) is a multi-purpose indoor arena that is part of the Olympic Ring complex located in Barcelona, Catalonia, Spain. Designed by the Japanese architect Arata Isozaki, it was opened in 1990. With a maximum seating capacity of 17,960, it is the largest indoor arena in Spain.

The Palau Sant Jordi was one of the main venues of the 1992 Summer Olympics, hosting the artistic gymnastics, handball, and volleyball events. Today, it is used for a variety of indoor sport events as well as for concerts and other cultural activities, due to its great flexibility.

== Events ==
=== Sports ===
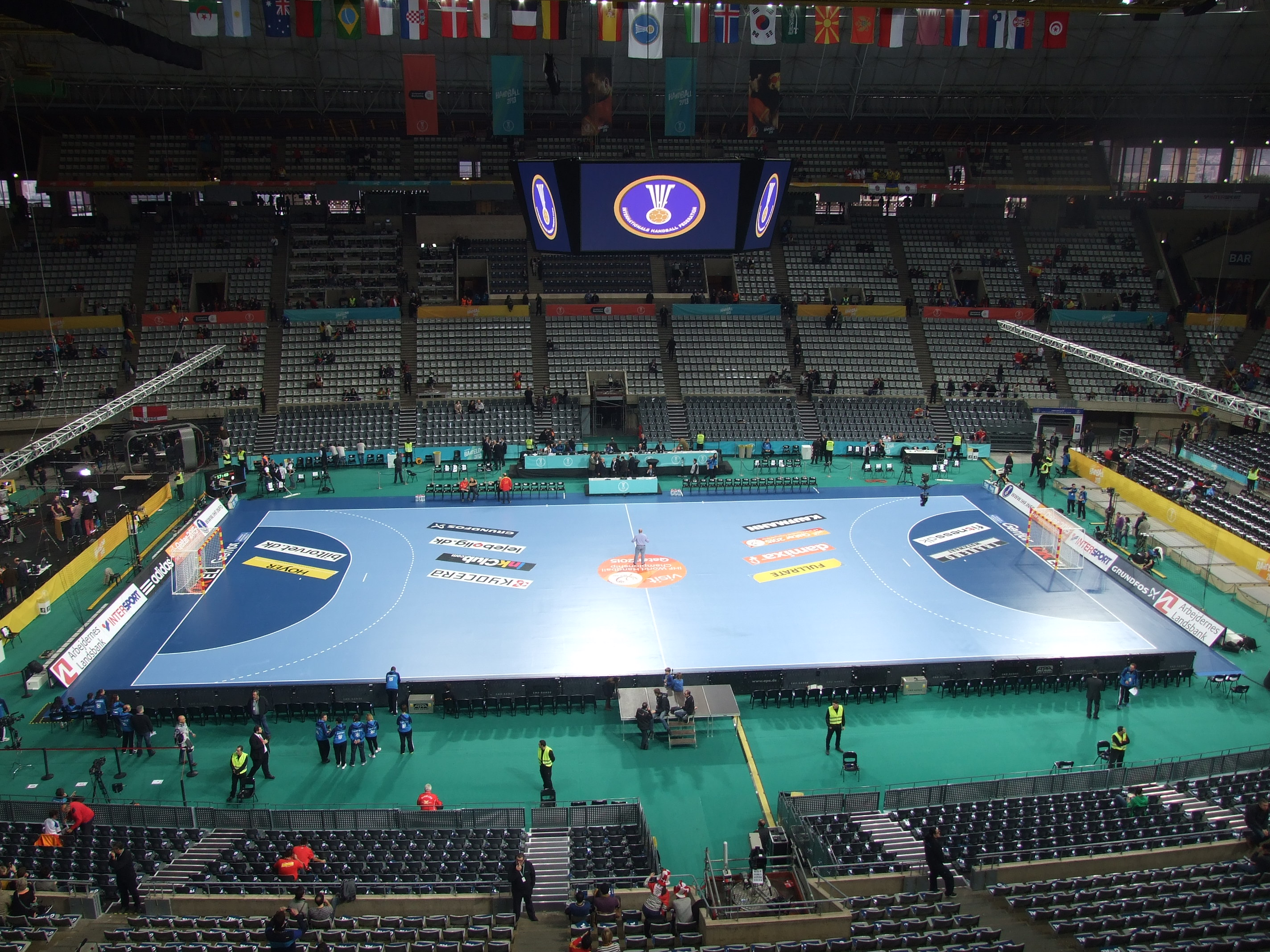
The Palau Sant Jordi ahead of the 2013 World Men's Handball Championship final

The arena was the venue of the IAAF World Indoor Championships in Athletics

It was the venue of three EuroLeague Final Fours. It also hosted the EuroBasket, from the quarterfinals on, and the Copa del Rey.

The final of Davis Cup was the 89th edition of the most important tournament between nations in men's tennis. Spain defeated Australia at Palau Sant Jordi on 8–10 December, giving Spain their first title. The arena also hosted the finals of Davis Cup between Spain and Czech Republic with the victory for the Spaniards 5–0.

Palau Sant Jordi was the main venue of the FINA World Championships. A temporary, regulation swimming pool was installed for the occasion. It played the same role for the FINA World Championships, since the city of Barcelona hosted the Championships again after 10 years.

It was one of six sites that hosted the World Men's Handball Championship including the final. It was also one of six sites to host the FIBA Basketball World Cup in Spain.

On 5 October, 2016, the arena hosted an NBA preseason game between the Oklahoma City Thunder and local team FC Barcelona Regal.

=== Concerts ===
Madonna performing live at the Palau Sant Jordi in 2023 during The Celebration Tour (left) and Within Temptation at the arena in 2024 (right)

Year	Date	Artist	Tour
1990	29 September	Luciano Pavarotti	—
1990	20 October (Note: Recorded for a live album/DVD or TV)	Miguel Bosé	Tour'90
1990	5 November	Depeche Mode	World Violation Tour
1990	22 November	Eros Ramazzotti	Tour 1990
1991	12 April	MC Hammer	Too Legit to Quit Tour
1991	22 May	Pet Shop Boys	Performance Tour
1991	10 June	Gloria Estefan	Into the Light World Tour
1991	14 June	Sau; Sopa de Cabra; Els Pets; Sangtraït	Concert del Palau Sant Jordi
1991	25 June	Bee Gees	High Civilization World Tour
1991	10 July	Diana Ross	Here & Now Tour
1991	15 July	Paul Simon	Born at the Right Time Tour
1991	22 July	Simple Minds	Real Life Tour
1991	1 October	Mecano	Aidalai Tour
1991	2 October	Mecano	Aidalai Tour
1991	4 December	Eros Ramazzotti	Eros in Concert
1992	16 May	U2	Zoo TV Tour
1992	18 May	U2	Zoo TV Tour
1992	3 June	Frank Sinatra	The Diamond Jubilee World Tour
1992	22 September	Julio Iglesias	Souvenir Collection Tour
1992	2 October	Dire Straits	On Every Street Tour
1992	3 October	Dire Straits	On Every Street Tour
1992	4 October	Dire Straits	On Every Street Tour
1992	12 November	Metallica	Wherever We May Roam Tour
1993	30 April	Bon Jovi	Keep the Faith Tour
1993	10 May	Peter Gabriel	Secret World Tour
1993	11 May	Sade	Love Deluxe Tour
1993	7 June	Elton John	The One Tour
1993	17 July	Depeche Mode	Devotional Tour
1993	28 July	Sting	Ten Summoner's Tales
1993	22 August	Prince	Act I and II
1993	5 October	Juan Luis Guerra	Areíto Tour
1993	6 October	Juan Luis Guerra	Areíto Tour
1993	26 October	Paul McCartney	The New World Tour
1993	27 October	Paul McCartney	The New World Tour
1994	4 May	Phil Collins	Both Sides of the World Tour
1994	22 September	Garth Brooks	The Garth Brooks World Tour
1994	1 December	Roxette	Crash! Boom! Bang! World Tour
1995	18 February	R.E.M.	Monster Tour
1995	26 March	Janet Jackson	Janet World Tour
1995	4 May	Eric Clapton	Nothing But the Blues Tour
1995	5 May	Eric Clapton	Nothing But the Blues Tour
1995	15 November	Héroes del Silencio	Avalancha Tour
1995	2 December	Simply Red	Life World Tour
1996	2 July	AC/DC	Ballbreaker World Tour
1996	3 July	AC/DC	Ballbreaker World Tour
1996	4 July	Bryan Adams	18 til I Die
1996	15 September	Tina Turner	Wildest Dreams Tour
1996	17 September	Tina Turner	Wildest Dreams Tour
1996	18 September	Tina Turner	Wildest Dreams Tour
1996	23 September	Metallica	Poor Touring Me
1996	25 October	Gloria Estefan	Evolution Tour
1997	6 February	Shakira	Pies Descalzos Tour
1997	23 April	Maria del Mar Bonet	El Cor del Temps
1997	25 April	Laura Pausini	World Wide Tour
1997	26 June	Supertramp	It's About Time Tour
1997	27 June	Julio Iglesias	European Tour
1997	8 July	Enrique Iglesias	Vivir World Tour
1997	7 October	Phil Collins	Trip Into the Light World Tour
1998	13 March	Spice Girls	Spiceworld: The Tour
1998	21 March	Genesis	Calling All Stations Tour
1998	9 April	Backstreet Boys	Backstreet's Back Tour
1998	12 May	Luis Miguel	Romances Tour
1998	18 June	Alejandro Sanz	Más Tour
1998	19 June	Alejandro Sanz	Más Tour
1998	16 October	Depeche Mode	The Singles Tour
1998	26 October	Eric Clapton	Pilgrim Tour
1998	27 November	The Corrs	Talk on Corners World Tour
1998	18 December	Prince	New Power Soul Tour
1999	9 April	Bruce Springsteen	Reunion Tour
1999	11 April	Bruce Springsteen	Reunion Tour
1999	2 May	Bryan Adams	On a Day Like Today Tour
1999	1 July	Jarabe de Palo	European Tour
1999	6 July	Mike Oldfield	Then and Now Tour
1999	12 July	Metallica	Garage Remains The Same
1999	13 July	Backstreet Boys	Into The Millennium Tour
1999	14 July	Backstreet Boys	Into The Millennium Tour
1999	15 July	Aerosmith	Nine Lives Tour
1999	5 October	Luis Miguel	Amarte Es Un Placer Tour
1999	6 October	Luis Miguel	Amarte Es Un Placer Tour
1999	14 November	Texas	White on Blonde Tour
1999	5 December	The Cranberries	Loud and Clear Tour
1999	15 December	Cher	Do You Believe?
2000	29 April	Ricky Martin	Livin' la Vida Loca World Tour
2000	30 April	Ricky Martin	Livin' la Vida Loca World Tour
2000	20 May	Santana	Supernatural Tour
2000	25 May	Pearl Jam	Binaural Tour
2000	13 July	Joaquín Sabina	19 Días y 500 Noches
2000	23 July	Iron Maiden	Brave New World
2000	7 September	Miguel Bosé & Ana Torroja	Girados
2000	22 October	Britney Spears	Oops!...I Did It Again Tour
2000	14 December	AC/DC	Stiff Upper Lip World Tour
2001	25 February	Eric Clapton	Reptile World Tour
2001	27 March	Tom Jones	European Tour
2001	9 May	Estopa	Gira Ducados
2001	8 June	Westlife	Where Dreams Come True Tour
2001	9 June	Madonna	Drowned World Tour
2001	10 June	Madonna	Drowned World Tour
2001	1 July	La Oreja de Van Gogh	European Tour
2001	3 July	Alejandro Sanz	El Alma al Aire Tour
2001	4 July	Alejandro Sanz	El Alma al Aire Tour
2001	6 July	Alejandro Sanz	El Alma al Aire Tour
2001	8 August	U2	Elevation Tour
2001	13 October	Depeche Mode	Exciter Tour
2001	24 October	Roxette	Room Service Tour
2002	15 March	Weezer	European Tour
2002	16 March	The Cranberries	Wake Up And Smell The Coffee Tour
2002	9-11 April	Operación Triunfo	OT en Concierto
2002	28 April	Supertramp	One More for the Road Tour
2002	8 May	Roger Waters	In The Flesh Tour
2002	30 May	Estopa	Destrangis
2002	13 September	Chayanne	Tour 2002
2002	9 October	Luis Miguel	Mis Romances Tour
2002	16 October (Note: Concert recorded, partially broadcast and later entirely released on DVD with the title Live in Barcelona)	Bruce Springsteen	The Rising Tour
2002	10 December	Shakira	Tour of the Mongoose
2002	11 December	Alice Cooper	Descent Into Dragontown Tour
2002	21 December	David Bisbal	Corazón Latino Tour
2003	4 January	Various	Festival Nit de Reis
2003	21 February	Bryan Adams	Here I Am Tour
2003	28 March	Paul McCartney	Back in the World
2003	29 March	Paul McCartney	Back in the World
2003	20 May	Bon Jovi	Bounce Tour
2003	1 June	Peter Gabriel	Growing Up Tour
2003	7 June	Operación Triunfo 2	Gira Generación OT
2003	11 June	Iron Maiden	Give Me Ed... 'til I'm Dead
2003	18 September	Hombres G	Peligrosamente Juntos Tour
2003	23 September	Santana	Shaman Tour
2003	22 October	Christina Aguilera	The Stripped Tour
2003	24 October	Robbie Williams	Cock of Justice Tour
2003	6 November	Van Morrison	European Tour
2003	3 December	Joan Manuel Serrat	Gira 2003
2003	21 December	Elton John	Solo Tour
2004	24 March	Eric Clapton	European Tour
2004	24 April	Eros Ramazzotti	Tour 2004
2004	2 June	Sting	Sacred Love Tour
2004	4 June	David Bisbal	Bulería Tour
2004	14 June	Lenny Kravitz	European Tour
2004	17 June	Estopa	Gira Muñoz vs. Muñoz
2004	1 July	Phil Collins	First Final Farewell Tour
2004	2 July	B. B.King	European Tour
2004	7 September	Alejandro Sanz	No Es lo Mismo Tour
2004	14 September	Chayanne	Tour Sincero
2004	15 September	Hilary Duff	Most Wanted Tour
2004	1 October	El Canto del Loco	Estados de ánimo
2004	2 October	Luis Miguel	Tour 33
2004	7 October	David Bisbal	Bulería Tour
2005	9 January	R.E.M.	Around the Sun Tour
2005	27 January	Bryan Adams	Room Service Tour
2005	2 April	Queen + Paul Rodgers	Return Of The Champions Tour
2005	7 April	Mark Knopfler	Shangri-La
2005	23 April	Various	Sant Jordi Musical
2005	27 May	Avril Lavigne	Bonez Tour
2005	11 June	Destiny's Child	Destiny Fulfilled... and Lovin' It
2005	16 June	Miguel Bosé	Velvetina Tour
2005	8 July	Rod Stewart	From Maggie May To The Great United States Songbook
2005	14 July	Hombres G, El Canto del Loco	Gira locos y en zapatillas
2005	15 September	Amaral	Pájaros en la Cabeza Tour
2005	19 September	Fito & Fitipaldis	European Tour 2005
2005	17 November	Andrés Calamaro	European Tour
2005	20 November	Coldplay	Twisted Logic Tour
2005	25 November	Operación Triunfo	OT 2005 en concierto
2006	10 February	Depeche Mode	Touring the Angel
2006	11 February	Depeche Mode	Touring the Angel
2006	8 March	Alejandro Fernández	Viento A Favor Tour
2006	17 May	Il Divo	The Ancora Tour
2006	23 May	Eagles	Farewell I Tour
2006	30 May	Red Hot Chili Peppers	Stadium Arcadium World Tour
2006	31 May	Red Hot Chili Peppers	Stadium Arcadium World Tour
2006	8 June	El Canto del Loco	Zapatillas
2006	9 June	El Canto del Loco	Zapatillas
2006	13 June	Mark Knopfler, Emmylou Harris	All the Roadrunning
2006	15 June	Estopa	Gira Ultrarumba
2006	20 June (Note: The concert was held at the Sant Jordi Club.)	Whitesnake	Live... In The Shadow of The Blues
2006	28 June	Shakira	Oral Fixation Tour
2006	29 June	Joaquín Sabina	Tour 2006
2006	7 September	Ana Torroja	Tour La Fuerza del Destino
2006	16 September	La Oreja de Van Gogh	European Tour
2006	23 September	George Michael	25 Live Tour
2006	15 October	Marc Anthony	Sigo Siendo Yo Tour
2006	24 October	Bruce Springsteen	Seeger Sessions
2006	30 November	Iron Maiden	A Matter of Life and Death Tour
2006	1 December	Fito & Fitipaldis	2006 European Tour
2006	2 December	Erreway	European Tour
2007	6 January	RBD	Tour Generación
2007	21 April	Roger Waters	The Dark Side of the Moon Live
2007	28 April	Operación Triunfo	OT 2007 en concierto
2007	30 April	Luis Miguel	México en la Piel
2007	12 May	Marea	European Tour
2007	27 May	Beyoncé	The Beyoncé Experience
2007	17 June	Il Divo	Il Divo Global Tour
2007	26 June	Maná	Amar es Combatir Tour
2007	3 July	Ricky Martin	Black and White Tour
2007	4 September	Alejandro Sanz	El Tren De Los Momentos Tour
2007	13 October	El Sueño de Morfeo	European Tour
2007	18 October	MIKA	Dodgy Holiday Tour
2007	20 October	Take That	Beautiful World Tour
2007	16 November	Fito & Fitipaldis	Tour 2007
2007	17 November	Fito & Fitipaldis	Tour 2007
2008	10 March	The Cure	4Tour
2008	16 March	Alicia Keys	As I Am Tour
2008	2 April	Mark Knopfler	Kill To Get Crimson Tour
2008	13 June	Estopa	Gira Allenrok
2008	27 June	Tokio Hotel	1000 Hotels European Tour
2008	29 June	Marc Anthony	Tour
2008	4 July	El Canto del Loco	Personas
2008	12 July	Operación Triunfo	Operación Triunfo en concierto
2008	25 August	RBD	Empezar desde Cero 08 World Tour - "Tour del Adiós"
2008	6 September	Coldplay	Viva la Vida Tour
2008	3 October	Amaral	Gato Negro - Dragón Rojo Tour
2008	9 October	Juan Luis Guerra	Travesia Tour
2008	11 October	Enrique Bunbury	European Tour
2008	22 October	Queen + Paul Rodgers	Rock the Cosmos Tour
2008	13 November	Sigur Rós	European Tour
2008	15 November	Simple Plan	European Tour
2008	23 December	El Canto del Loco	Personas
2008	27 December	Muchachito Bombo Infierno	Gira Visto lo Visto
2009	1 February	Marillion	Happiness Is The Road
2009	11 March	The Australia Pink Floyd	The "Wall" Tour
2009	31 March	AC/DC	Black Ice World Tour
2009	3 April	Il Divo	An Evening with Il Divo
2009	24 April	Ricardo Arjona	5to Piso Tour
2009	30 April	Laura Pausini	Primavera In Anticipo World Tour
2009	15 May	Fangoria	Absolutamente Tour
2009	20 May	Beyoncé	I Am... World Tour
2009	21 May	Gary Moore	Bad For You Baby World Tour
2009	13 June	Hombres G	10 World Tour
2009	14 July	John Fogerty	European Tour
2009	25 June	Katy Perry	Hello Katy Tour
2009	14 September	Deep Purple	Rapture of the Deep Tour
2009	19 September	Raphael	50 años de Artista
2009	21 September	Leonard Cohen	Leonard Cohen Tour -
2009	1 October	Green Day	21st Century Breakdown World Tour
2009	20 October	Elton John	Red Piano European Tour
2009	20 November	Depeche Mode	Tour of the Universe
2009	21 November	Depeche Mode	Tour of the Universe
2009	23 November	Porcupine Tree	The Incident Tour
2009	24 November	Muse	The Resistance Tour
2009	12 December	Fito & Fitipaldis	Antes de Que Cuente 10 Tour
2009	13 December	Fito & Fitipaldis	Antes de Que Cuente 10 Tour
2009	17 December	Joaquín Sabina	Vinagre y Rosas Tour
2009	19 December	El Canto del Loco	Gira Hasta Luego
2009	30 December	Cirque du Soleil	Saltimbanco
2010	24 January	Billy Talent	European Tour
2010	6 February	Arctic Monkeys	Humbug Tour
2010	16 February	Eros Ramazzotti	European Tour
2010	27 March	Tangerine Dream	European Tour
2010	5 April	Tokio Hotel	Welcome to Humanoid City
2010	9 April	Loquillo	Rock & Roll Star 30 Años
2010	16 April	Violadores del Verso	Tour
2010	18 April	MIKA	Imaginarium Tour
2010	23 April	Love of Lesbian	EscenaBCN
2010	12 May	Alejandro Sanz	Paraiso Tour
2010	27 May	Jamie Cullum	European Tour
2010	2 June	Alicia Keys	The Freedom Tour
2010	22 June	Placebo	Battle For The Sun Tour
2010	24 June	KISS	Sonic Boom Over Europe: From the Beginning to the Boom
2010	27 June	Aerosmith	Cocked, Locked, Ready to Rock
2010	12 September	Manowar	Death To Infidels Tour
2010	15 September	Alejandro Sanz	Paraiso Tour
2010	16 September	Joaquín Sabina	Vinagre Y Rosas Tour
2010	17 September	Chayanne	No Hay Imposibles Tour
2010	18 September	Supertramp	70-10 Tour
2010	23 September	Peter Gabriel	New Blood Tour
2010	25 September	Mägo de Oz	Gaia III
2010	29 September	Miguel Bosé	Cardio Tour
2010	15 October	A-ha	Ending on a High Note Tour
2010	20 October	Avenged Sevenfold	Nightmare Tour
2010	28 October	Joaquín Sabina	Vinagre Y Rosas Tour
2010	29 October	Sting	Symphonicity Tour
2010	30 October	Michael Bublé	Crazy Love Tour
2010	6 November	Blind Guardian	Sacred Worlds and Songs Divine Tour
2010	11 November	Sum 41	The Eastpak Antidote Tour
2010	12 November	!!!	European Tour
2010	13 November	Yann Tiersen	European Tour
2010	14 November	Interpol	European Autumn Tour
2010	21 November	Arcade Fire	The Suburbs Tour
2010	23 November	Alice Cooper	Theatre Of Death Tour
2010	24 November	Shakira	The Sun Comes Out World Tour
2010	25 November	Miguel Ríos	Bye Bye, Ríos, Rock Hasta el Final
2010	7 December	Lady Gaga	The Monster Ball Tour
2010	17 December	Motörhead	35th Anniversary Tour
2010	18 December	Thirty Seconds to Mars	Into the Wild Tour
2010	23 December	Pereza	Aviones Tour
2011	5 March	My Chemical Romance	World Contamination Tour
2011	12 March	Kylie Minogue	Aphrodite: Les Folies
2011	29 March	Roger Waters	The Wall Live
2011	30 March	Roger Waters	The Wall Live
2011	1 April	Slayer, Megadeth	European Carnage Tour
2011	6 April	Justin Bieber	My World Tour
2011	21 May	Franz Ferdinand	European Tour
2011	22 May	Fangoria	Operación Vodevil
2011	29 June	Ricky Martin	Música + Alma + Sexo World Tour
2011	9 September	Sopa de Cabra	Gira 25 Anys
2011	10 September	Sopa de Cabra	Gira 25 Anys
2011	11 September	Sopa de Cabra	Gira 25 Anys
2011	20 September	Maná	Drama Y Luz
2011	27 September	George Michael	Symphonica: The European Orchestral Tour
2011	1 November	Peter Frampton	Frampton Comes Alive! 35th Anniversary
2011	5 November	Yes	Fly from Here Tour
2011	8 November	Peter Frampton	Frampton Comes Alive! 35th Anniversary
2011	19 November	Roxette	Charm School World Tour
2011	14 December	Rihanna	Loud Tour
2011	15 December	Red Hot Chili Peppers	I'm With You Tour
2011	22 December	Maldita Nerea	Gira Fácil
2011	29 December	Amaral, Love of Lesbian	Fnac Music Festival Barcelona
2012	21 January	Enrique Bunbury	Licenciado Cantinas
2012	28 January	Arctic Monkeys	Suck It And See Tour
2012	11 February	Barón Rojo	30th Anniversary Reunion
2012	24 February	Dream Theater	A Dramatic Tour of Events
2012	25 February	Estopa	2.0
2012	3 March	Michel Teló	Na Balada
2012	17 March	LMFAO	Sorry for Party Rocking Tour
2012	13 April	Paul Kalkbrenner	European Tour
2012	21 April	Laura Pausini	Inedito World Tour
2012	26 April	Il Divo	Il Divo & Orchestra In Concert
2012	16 May	Judas Priest	Epitaph Tour
2012	17 May	Bruce Springsteen	Wrecking Ball World Tour
2012	18 May	Bruce Springsteen	Wrecking Ball World Tour
2012	3 June	Lenny Kravitz	Black And White America Tour
2012	20 June	Madonna	The MDNA Tour
2012	21 June	Madonna	The MDNA Tour
2012	19 July	Blink-182	20th Anniversary Tour
2012	12 September	Holyhell	Tour
2012	27 September	Miguel Bosé	PapiTwo
2012	29 September	Manic Street Preachers	International Treasures Tour
2012	3 October	Leonard Cohen	Old Ideas World Tour
2012	4 October	The Cranberries	Roses Tour
2012	6 October	Lady Gaga	The Born This Way Ball
2012	13 October	Manowar	The Lord of Steel World Tour
2012	19 October	Russian Red	Tour
2012	6 December	Primavera Club Festival	Primavera Club Festival
2012	15 December	Brit Floyd	A Foot In The Door World Tour
2013	2 February	David Bisbal	Tour Acústico
2013	3 February	Pep Sala	25 Anys de Sau
2013	16 February	Sigur Rós	Valtari Tour
2013	16 March	Justin Bieber	Believe Tour
2013	20 March	Mumford & Sons	Babel Tour
2013	14 April	Rammstein	Made in Germany Tour
2013	25 May	Melendi	Lágrimas Desordenadas
2013	29 May	Alejandro Sanz	La Música No Se Toca
2013	30 May	Alejandro Sanz	La Música No Se Toca
2013	1 June	Rihanna	Diamonds World Tour
2013	7 June	Muse	The Unsustainable Tour
2013	19 September	Eros Ramazzotti	Noi World Tour
2013	10 October	Dios Salve a la Reina	Tour
2013	11 October	Pablo Alborán	Tour Tanto
2013	12 October	Pablo Alborán	Tour Tanto
2013	18 October	Melendi	Lágrimas Desordenadas
2013	22 November	Malú	Tour Sí
2013	29 November	Violetta	Violetta en Vivo
2013	30 November	Violetta	Violetta en Vivo
2013	1 December	Violetta	Violetta en Vivo
2013	7 December	Imagine Dragons	Night Visions Tour
2013	27 December	Mägo de Oz	Brujería, Brujería Tour
2014	15 January	Depeche Mode	The Delta Machine Tour
2014	18 January	Dream Theater	Along for the Ride
2014	30 January	Michael Bublé	To Be Loved Tour
2014	20 February	Backstreet Boys	In A World Like This Tour
2014	1 March	Fall Out Boy	Save Rock and Roll World Tour
2014	22 March	WarCry	Inmortal Tour
2014	22 March	Romeo Santos	Vol. 2 World Tour
2014	24 March	Beyoncé	The Mrs. Carter Show World Tour
2014	29 March	Europe	World Tour
2014	5 April	Franz Ferdinand	Right Thoughts, Right Words, Right Action
2014	15 May	Crystal Fighters	European Tour
2014	27 May	Iron Maiden	Maiden England World Tour
2014	13 June	Miley Cyrus	Bangerz Tour
2014	19 June	Enrique Bunbury	Palosanto Tour
2014	29 June	Various Female Singers	Que Trabaje Rita
2014	5 July	David Bisbal	Tú Y Yo Tour
2014	12 July	Lena	No One Can Catch Us Tour
2014	20 July	Alejandro Fernández	Confidencias World Tour
2014	23 July	Katie Melua	European Tour
2014	1 October	Pharrell Williams	Dear GIRL Tour
2014	10 October	Morrissey	World Peace Is None Of Your Business
2014	10 October.	Malú	Tour Sí
2014	14 October	Kylie Minogue	Kiss Me Once Tour
2014	29 October	Placebo	Loud Like Love
2014	1 November	Extremoduro	Para Todos los Públicos
2014	8 November	Lady Gaga	artRAVE: The ARTPOP Ball
2014	13 November	Enrique Iglesias	Sex and Love World Tour
2014	19 November	OneRepublic	Native World Tour
2014	24 November	Ed Sheeran	X Tour
2014	6 December	Elton John	Follow the Yellow Brick Road Tour
2014	12 December	Mónica Naranjo	Tour 4.0
2014	13 December	Maldita Nerea	Gira Mira Dentro
2014	20 December	Abraham Mateo	Tour Who I AM
2014	21 December	Fito & Fitipaldis	Huyendo Conmigo de Mí
2014	22 December	Joaquín Sabina	500 noches para una crisis
2014	23 December	Joaquín Sabina	500 noches para una crisis
2015	10 January	Violetta	Violetta Live
2015	11 January	Violetta	Violetta Live
2015	31 January	El Barrio	Hijo del Levante Tour
2015	16 February	Katy Perry	Prismatic World Tour
2015	27 March	Robbie Williams	Let Me Entertain You Tour
2015	30 March	The Script	No Sound Without Silence Tour
2015	22 April	Joaquín Sabina	500 noches para una crisis
2015	24 April	Vetusta Morla	Gira La Deriva
2015	25 April	Vetusta Morla	Gira La Deriva
2015	14 May	Roxette	30th Anniversary World Tour
2015	15 May	The Vamps	Meet The Vamps Tour
2015	16 May	Melendi	Gira Un Alumno Más
2015	14 June	Maroon 5	Maroon V Tour
2015	16 June	Ariana Grande	The Honeymoon Tour
2015	18 June	Pablo Alborán	Tour Terral
2015	19 June	Pablo Alborán	Tour Terral
2015	21 June	KISS	The KISS 40th Anniversary World Tour
2015	3 July	The Bootleg Beatles	Tour
2015	4 July	Luis Fonsi	Somos Uno Tour
2015	8 July	Slash	World On Fire Tour
2015	19 July	Juan Luis Guerra	Todo Tiene Su Hora Tour
2015	6 September	Maná	Cama Incendiada Tour
2015	9 September	Miguel Bosé	Amo Tour
2015	10 September	Hombres G	30 Años y Un Día Tour
2015	16 September	Alejandro Sanz	Sirope Tour
2015	17 September	Alejandro Sanz	Sirope Tour
2015	19 September	Fito & Fitipaldis	Huyendo Conmigo de Mí
2015	3 October	Dios Salve a la Reina	Tour España
2015	5 October	U2	iNNOCENCE + eXPERIENCE Tour
2015	6 October	U2	iNNOCENCE + eXPERIENCE Tour
2015	9 October	U2	iNNOCENCE + eXPERIENCE Tour
2015	10 October	U2	iNNOCENCE + eXPERIENCE Tour
2015	23 October	Pablo Alborán	Tour Terral
2015	14 November	El Barrio	Hijo del Levante Tour
2015	24 November	Madonna	Rebel Heart Tour
2015	25 November	Madonna	Rebel Heart Tour
2015	27 November	Estopa	Rumba a lo desconocido
2015	29 November	Okean Elzy	European Tour
2015	11 December	Izal	Copacabana Tour
2015	19 December	Rosendo	Tour
2016	1–10 January	Cirque Du Soleil	Varekai
2016	30 January	Bryan Adams	Get Up! Tour
2016	5 February	Ellie Goulding	Delirium World Tour
2016	14 February	Eros Ramazzotti	Perfetto World Tour
2016	27 February	Simple Plan	Taking One For The Team Tour
2016	9 April	Noel Gallagher's High Flying Birds	Chasing Yesterday Tour
2016	14 April	Kygo	Cloud Nine World Tour
2016	16 April	Florence + the Machine	How Big, How Blue, How Beautiful Tour
2016	17 April	Silvio Rodríguez	European Tour
2016	20 May	Malú	Tour Caos
2016	22 May	Queen + Adam Lambert	Queen + Adam Lambert Summer Festival Tour
2016	24 May	Adele	Adele Live
2016	25 May	Adele	Adele Live
2016	10 June	5 Seconds of Summer	Sounds Live Feels Live World Tour
2016	11 June	Amaral	#NocturnalTour25
2016	19 June	Chris Brown	One Hell of A Nite Tour
2016	22 June	Pentatonix	Pentatonix World Tour
2016	28 June	Various	El Gusto Es Nuestro 20 Aniversario
2016	8 July	Alejandro Sanz	Sirope Tour
2016	21 July	Rihanna	Anti World Tour
2016	1 October	Red Hot Chili Peppers	The Getaway World Tour
2016	2 October	Red Hot Chili Peppers	The Getaway World Tour
2016	6 October	Brit Floyd	Space and Time Continuum World Tour
2016	7 October	Maluma	Pretty Boy, Dirty Boy World Tour
2016	14 October	Fifth Harmony	7/27 Tour
2016	15 October	Estopa	Gira Un paseo
2016	31 October	Operación Triunfo	Operación Triunfo: El Reencuentro
2016	20 November	Pixies	Head Carrier Tour
2016	22 November	Justin Bieber	Purpose World Tour
2016	26 November	The Cure	European Tour
2016	7 December	Crystal Fighters	Everything is My Family Tour
2016	23 December	Malú	Tour Caos
2016	28 December	Manuel Carrasco	Tour Bailar el Viento
2017	14 January	Izal	Copacabana Tour
2017	22 January	Sabaton	The Last Tour
2017	25 January	Biffy Clyro	Ellipsis European Winter Tour
2017	5 February	Bastille	Wild Wild World Tour
2017	18 February	Isabel Pantoja	Hasta Que Se Apague el Sol
2017	18 March	Korn	The Serenity of Suffering
2017	19 March	Gente de Zona	Tour
2017	21 March	Sting	57th & 9th Tour
2017	25 March	Gemeliers	Tour 2017
2017	5 April	Carlos Vives	La Fiesta de Todos Tour
2017	7 April	Bruno Mars	24K Magic World Tour
2017	9 April	Ed Sheeran	Divide Tour
2017	12 May	Shawn Mendes	Illuminate World Tour
2017	21 May	J Balvin	Energía Tour
2017	26 May	Melendi	Gira Quítate las Gafas
2017	30 May	Ricky Martin	One World Tour
2017	13 June	Ariana Grande	Dangerous Woman Tour
2017	16 June	David Bisbal	Hijos del Mar Tour
2017	28 June	Joaquín Sabina	Lo Niego Todo
2017	17 September	Maluma	Maluma World Tour
2017	7 October	Raphael	Loco Por Cantar
2017	9 October	Lorde	Melodrama World Tour
2017	12 October	John Legend	Darkness and Light Tour
2017	30 October	Royal Blood	How did we get so dark?
2017	24 November	Love of Lesbian	Gira El Poeta Halley
2017	25 November	Love of Lesbian	Gira El Poeta Halley
2017	1 December	Los Planetas	Zona Temporalmente Autónoma
2017	3 December	Elton John	Wonderful Crazy Night Tour
2017	7 December	Depeche Mode	Global Spirit Tour
2017	12 December	Five Finger Death Punch	European Tour
2017	20 December	Antonio Orozco	Tour Destino
2017	21 December	Antonio Orozco	Tour Destino
2017	22 December	Melendi	Gira Quítate las Gafas
2018	5 January	Soy Luna	Soy Luna Live
2018	7 January	Paramore	Tour Three
2018	8 January	Alt-J	Relaxer Tour
2018	14 January	Lady Gaga	Joanne World Tour
2018	16 January	Lady Gaga	Joanne World Tour
2018	20 January	Vanesa Martín	Gira Munay
2018	7 February	Metallica	WorldWired Tour
2018	17 February	India Martínez	Tour Secreto
2018	2 March	Operación Triunfo 2017	OT 2017 en concierto
2018	3 March	Operación Triunfo 2017	OT 2017 en concierto
2018	10 March	El Barrio	Tour 2017
2018	21 March	The Script	Freedom Child Tour
2018	30 March	Harry Styles	Harry Styles: Live on Tour
2018	6 April	Imagine Dragons	Evolve World Tour
2018	13 April	Roger Waters	Us + Them Tour
2018	14 April	Roger Waters	Us + Them Tour
2018	13 April	Thirty Seconds to Mars	The Monolith Tour
2018	19 April	Lana Del Rey	LA to the Moon Tour
2018	21 April	Arcade Fire	Infinite Content Tour
2018	10 May	Ramin Djawadi	Game of Thrones: Live Concert Experience
2018	11 May	Fito & Fitipaldis	Gira 2017 - 20 aniversario
2018	12 May	Fito & Fitipaldis	Gira 2017 - 20 aniversario
2018	12 May	Ricardo Arjona	Circo Soledad
2018	13 May	Ricardo Arjona	Circo Soledad
2018	15 May	Sam Smith	The Thrill of It All Tour
2018	17 May	Romeo Santos	Golden Tour
2018	19 May	Vetusta Morla	Mismo Sitio, Distanto Lugar
2018	26 May	Dani Martín	Grandes Éxitos y Pequeños Desastres
2018	8 June	Pablo Alborán	Prometo Tour
2018	9 June	Pablo Alborán	Prometo Tour
2018	10 June	Queen + Adam Lambert	Queen + Adam Lambert Tour –
2018	16 June	David Bisbal	David Bisbal Tour
2018	21 June	Demi Lovato	Tell Me You Love Me World Tour
2018	26 June	Ringo Starr & His All Starr Band	13th All Starr Band Tour
2018	26 June	Camila Cabello	Never Be the Same Tour
2018	28 June	Katy Perry	Witness: The Tour
2018	6 July	Shakira	El Dorado World Tour
2018	7 July	Shakira	El Dorado World Tour
2018	8 July	Luis Miguel	¡México Por Siempre!
2018	10 July	Pearl Jam	World Jam Tour
2018	15 September	Maluma	F.A.M.E. Tour
2018	28 September	Raphael	Gira Loco Por Cantar
2018	17 October	Laura Pausini	Fatti Sentire World Tour
2018	17 October	Jason Derulo	777 World Tour
2018	19 October	La Raíz	Tour
2018	20 October	Manolo García	Tour
2018	18 November	Slayer	Final World Tour
2018	23 November	Malú	Oxígeno Tour
2018	30 November	Antonio José	Gira A Un Milimetro de Ti
2018	1 December	Nightwish	Decades: World Tour
2018	8 December	El Barrio	Tour
2018	14 December	Loquillo	40 Años Rock and Roll Actitud
2018	15 December	Pablo López	Tour Santa Libertad
2018	20 December	Melendi	Ahora Tour
2018	21 December	Pablo Alborán	Prometo Tour
2018	23 December	Rosendo	Tour
2018	27 December	Operación Triunfo 2017	OT 2017: Hasta Pronto
2018	28 December	Operación Triunfo 2017	OT 2017: Hasta Pronto
2018	29 December	Kase.O	Gira El Círculo
2019	18–27 January	Cirque du Soleil	Toruk
2019	9 February	Ana Torroja, Ole'star	Yo Fui a EGB
2019	16 February	Massive Attack	Mezzanine XX1
2019	23 February	Gente de Zona	Tour España
2019	9 March	Billie Eilish	1 by 1 Tour
2019	15 March	CNCO	CNCO World Tour
2019	20 March	Florence and the Machine	High As Hope Tour
2019	23 March	Eros Ramazzotti	Vita Ce N'è World Tour
2019	23 March	Lágrimas de Sangre	LDS Tour
2019	26 March	Shawn Mendes	Shawn Mendes: The Tour
2019	5 April	Hans Zimmer, Lisa Gerrard	The World of Hans Zimmer
2019	25 April	Mark Knopfler	Down the Road Wherever
2019	27 April	Mumford & Sons	Delta Tour
2019	27 April	Fangoria	Extrapolaciones Y Dos Preguntas
2019	17 May	Backstreet Boys	DNA World Tour
2019	18 May	Pablo Alborán	Prometo Tour
2019	18 May	Morat	Balas Perdidas Tour
2019	24 May	Manuel Carrasco	La Cruz del Mapa
2019	24 May	Álvaro Soler	Mar de Colores Tour
2019	25 May	Leiva	Nuclear Tour
2019	26 May	Leiva	Nuclear Tour
2019	28 May	Blackpink	In Your Area World Tour
2019	31 May	Operación Triunfo 2018	OT 2018 en concierto
2019	31 May	Camela	Tour 2019
2019	24 June	Juan Luis Guerra	Literal Tour
2019	25 June	Glen Hansard	This Wild Willing Tour
2019	2 September	Billie Eilish	When We All Fall Asleep, World Tour
2019	8 September	Alice Cooper	Ol' Black Eyes Is Back
2019	27 September	Michael Bublé	An Evening with Michael Bublé
2019	5 October	Ara Malikian	Royal Garage World Tour
2019	11 October	Paulo Londra	Home Run Tour
2019	13 October	Anuel AA	Real Hasta la Muerte Tour
2019	23 October	Pixies	UK & Europe
2019	24 October	Mónica Naranjo	Renaissance Tour
2019	25 October	La Polla Records	Ni Descanso, Ni Paz!
2019	26 October	La Polla Records	Ni Descanso, Ni Paz!
2019	26 October	God Save the Queen	Dios Salve a la Reina
2019	1 November	Zoo	Tour
2019	3 November	Aitana	Play Tour
2019	3 November	Léo Santana	Baile da Santinha
2019	9 November	Alfred García	1016 Tour
2019	9 November	Raphael	RESinphónico
2019	15 November	Vanesa Martín	Gira Todas las mujeres que habitan en mí
2019	16 November	André Rieu and his Johann Strauss Orchestra	Tour 2019
2019	22 November	Amon Amarth	Berserker World Tour'19
2019	23 November	El Kanka	Donde Caben Dos Caben Tres
2019	26 November	Greta Van Fleet	"March of the Peaceful Army" World Tour
2019	28 November	Cepeda, Ana Guerra	Cepeda X Ana Guerra: Gira ImaginBank
2019	29 November	Els Catarres	Tour
2019	30 November	Amaral	Salto al Color
2019	30 November	Marea	Gira El Azogue
2019	4 December	Alter Bridge	Walk The Sky Tour'19
2019	5 December	Hans Zimmer	The World of Hans Zimmer
2019	7 December	Rosalía	El Mal Querer Tour
2019	8 December	Rosalía	El Mal Querer Tour
2019	8 December	Ghost	The Ultimate Tour Named Death
2019	11 December	Bryan Adams	Shine A Light Tour
2019	12 December	Morat	Balas Perdidas Tour
2019	14 December	Estopa	Gira Fuego
2019	15 December	Estopa	Gira Fuego
2020	11 January	Adexe & Nau	Tour 2020
2020	25 January	Joan Manuel Serrat; Joaquín Sabina	No Hay Dos Sin Tres
2020	28 January	Hatsune Miku	Hatsune Miku Expo Europe
2020	29 January	Dream Theater	The Distance Over Time Tour
2020	4 February	Sabaton	The Great Tour
2020	7 February	Halsey	Manic World Tour
2020	8 February	Fernando Costa	Tour 2020
2020	8 February	El Barrio	El Danzar de las Mariposas Tour
2020	15 February	Arnau Griso	Revolución Bananera
2020	17 February	Jonas Brothers	Happiness Begins Tour
2020	26 February	La Casa Azul	La Gran Esfera
2020	29 February	Izal	El Final del Viaje
2021	27 March	Love of Lesbian	Experiment
2021	17 April	Carlos Sadness	Isla Morenita Tour
2021	27 May	Antonio Orozco	Avionica Tour
2021	28 May	Antonio Orozco	Avionica Tour
2021	16 September	Ciro y los Persas	Un Viaje en el Tiempo
2021	27 September	Camilo	Mis Manos Tour
2021	9 October	Rauw Alejandro	Rauw Alejandro World Tour
2021	12 October	Justin Quiles	La Última Promesa Tour
2021	13 November (Note: The Dani Martín concert on 13 November 2021, became the first full-capacity concert at the Palau Sant Jordi since 29 February 2020 after COVID-19 social distancing restrictions started to lift.)	Dani Martín	Lo Que Me Dé La Gana
2021	19 November	ABBA: The New Experience	Tour 2021
2021	20 November	God Save the Queen	Real Queen Tribute
2021	25 November	David Bisbal	En Tus Planes Tour
2021	27 November	Roberto Iniesta	Gira Mayéutica
2021	4 December	Aitana	11 Razones Tour
2021	11 December	Raphael	Raphael 6.0
2021	18 December	Lluís Llach	Tour 2021
2021	22 December	Beret	Prisma Tour
2021	28 December	Pablo López	Gira Unikornio
2022	2 February	Bryan Adams	So Happy It Hurts Tour
2022	12 February	André Rieu and his Johann Strauss Orchestra	Tour 2022
2022	19 February	Bullet for My Valentine	Tour 2022
2022	5 March	Sen Senra	Corazón Cromado Tour
2022	12 March	Manuel Carrasco	La Cruz del Mapa Tour
2022	12 March	Ojete Calor	Tour 2022
2022	15 March	Franz Ferdinand	Hits to the Head Tour
2022	17 March	Tash Sultana	UK and Europe Tour
2022	18 March	Carlos Sadness	Isla Morenita Tour
2022	26 March	Nil Moliner	Nuestra Locura Tour
2022	31 March	Maluma	Papi Juancho World Tour
2022	22 April	Els Catarres	Gira 2022
2022	23 April	C. Tangana	Sin Cantar ni Afinar Tour
2022	24 April	Fangoria	Tour
2022	15 May	Lola Índigo	La Niña XXL
2022	20 May	Conan Gray	EU/UK Tour
2022	21 May	Vetusta Morla	Gira Cable a Tierra
2022	21 May	Hijos de la Ruina	Tour 2022
2022	28 May	Maka	Detrás de Esta Gira Hay Un Flamenco
2022	1 June	Dua Lipa	Future Nostalgia Tour
2022	3 June	Ru Paul's Drag Race	Werq the World
2022	4 June	Fito & Fitipaldis	Cada Vez Cadáver Tour
2022	26 June	Camilo	Mis Manos Tour
2022	30 June	Alicia Keys	Alicia + Keys World Tour
2022	1 July	Sebastián Yatra	Dharma Tour
2022	9 July	Anuel AA	Las Leyendas Nunca Mueren
2022	15 July	Gente de Zona	Tour 2022
2022	16 July	Eufòria	Eufòria En Concert
2022	17 July	Eufòria	Eufòria En Concert
2022	23 July	Rosalía	Motomami World Tour
2022	24 July	Rosalía	Motomami World Tour
2022	2 September	Morat	A Dónde Vamos Tour
2022	3 September	Aitana	11 Razones + Tour
2022	15 September	2Cellos	World Tour
2022	27 September	Russ	Shake the Globe Tour
2022	29 September	María Becerra	Animal Tour
2022	30 September	Malú	Mil Batallas Tour
2022	1 October	Melendi	Likes y Cicatrizes Tour
2022	1 October	Sigur Rós	Tour
2022	6 October	Backstreet Boys	DNA World Tour
2022	8 October	Izal	Gira Hogar
2022	15 October	Antònia Font	Reunion Tour
2022	16 October	The Black Crowes	Shake Your Money Maker Tour
2022	25 October	Franz Ferdinand	Hits to the Head Tour
2022	6 November	Moderat	Moderat Live
2022	7 November	Bon Iver	Tour
2022	10 November	The Cure	Tour Euro 22
2022	10 November	Volbeat	Servant of the Road World Tour
2022	12 November	Kase.O	Jazz Magnetism Tour
2022	14 November	Alt-J	The Dream Tour
2022	17 November	Lil Nas X	Long Live Montero Tour
2022	19 November	Trixie and Katya	Trixie & Katya Live
2022	24 November	Rigoberta Bandini	Rigotour
2022	25 November	Arnau Griso	Farewell Tour
2022	26 November	Sopa de Cabra	Gira 30 Anys Ben Endins
2022	26 November	Dorian	Gira Ritual
2022	29 November	Bastille	Give Me the Future Tour
2022	1 December	Antonio Orozco	Aviónica Tour
2022	3 December	Dani Martín	Gira Qué Caro Es El Tiempo
2022	3 December	Bomba Estéreo	Quién Viene Conmigo Tour
2022	5 December	Blackpink	Born Pink World Tour
2022	10 December	Zoo	Gira Llepolies
2022	20 December	Joan Manuel Serrat	El Vicio de Cantar (1965-2022)
2022	22 December	Joan Manuel Serrat	El Vicio de Cantar (1965-2022)
2022	23 December	Joan Manuel Serrat	El Vicio de Cantar (1965-2022)
2023	13 January	Fernando Costa	Tirititando Tour
2023	20 January	Dream Theater	Top of the World Tour
2023	27 January	Ayax	Solo Tour
2023	28 January	Ayax	Solo Tour
2023	28 January	Oques Grasses	La Gent Que Estimo
2023	1 February	Michael Bublé	Higher Tour
2023	3 February	Helloween	United Forces Tour
2023	11 February	Bad Gyal	La Joia Tour
2023	19 February	Bring Me the Horizon	A Day to Remember Tour
2023	24 February	Wos	—
2023	3 March	Duki	Desde el Fin del Mundo Tour
2023	4 March	Duki	Desde el Fin del Mundo Tour
2023	9 March	Pixies	Doggerel Tour
2023	12 March	André Rieu and his Johann Strauss Orchestra	Tour 2023
2023	12 March	Yungblud	Yungblud: the World Tour
2023	14 March	The Cat Empire	UK + Europe Tour
2023	17 March	Natos y Waor	Las voces de una generación
2023	21 March	Roger Waters	This Is Not a Drill
2023	24 March	Robbie Williams	XXV Tour
2023	25 March	Robbie Williams	XXV Tour
2023	2 April	Eros Ramazzotti	Battito Infinito World Tour
2023	11 April	Måneskin	Loud Kids Tour Gets Louder '22-23
2023	15 April	Ojete Calor	Pena de bofetón que no te dieron a tiempo Global Tour
2023	22 April	Companyia Elèctrica Dharma	Gira 50 Anys
2023	22 April	Danny Ocean	—
2023	12 May	Pablo López	Gira 2023
2023	12 May	Quevedo	DQE Tour
2023	13 May	Quevedo	DQE Tour
2023	13 May	Lola Índigo	El Dragón
2023	22 May	Elton John	Farewell Yellow Brick Road
2023	23 May	Elton John	Farewell Yellow Brick Road
2023	14 June	The Who	The Who Hits Back!
2023	16 June	Maroon 5	UK + Europe · 2023 Tour
2023	17 June	Alejandro Sanz	Sanz En Vivo
2023	25 June	Tini	Tini Tour
2023	29 June	India Martínez	Nuestro Mundo Tour
2023	30 June	Miki Núñez	Gira 2023
2023	2 July	Eufòria 2	Eufòria en concert
2023	3 July	Juan Luis Guerra	Entre Mar y Palmeras Tour
2023	4 July	Kany García	Tour España
2023	9 July	Feid	Nitrojam Tour
2023	15 July	Marco Antonio Solís	El Buki Tour
2023	18 July	Iron Maiden	The Future Past World Tour
2023	1 September	Rauw Alejandro	Saturno World Tour
2023	3 September	Helloween	United Forces Tour
2023	6 September	Bi-2	Tour 2023
2023	27 September	Joaquín Sabina	Contra Todo Pronóstico Tour
2023	29 September	Joaquín Sabina	Contra Todo Pronóstico Tour
2023	30 September	Hombres G	Gira 40 años y seguimos empezando
2023	4 October	Blink-182	World Tour 2023/2024
2023	6 October	Louis Tomlinson	Faith In The Future Tour
2023	7 October	Vanesa Martín	Gira Placeres y pecados
2023	7 October	Desakato	El año que vivimos intensamente
2023	10 October	Hauser	Rebel with a Cello
2023	12 October	Aitana	Alpha Tour
2023	13 October	Aitana	Alpha Tour
2023	15 October	Maka	Gloria Bendita Tour
2023	18 October	Marco Mengoni	Tour 2023
2023	21 October	Manuel Carrasco	Corazón y Flecha
2023	27 October	Jungle	Tour 2023
2023	28 October	Miguel Ríos	Gira 40 Aniversario
2023	29 October	Mora	Estela Tour
2023	31 October	Mora	Estela Tour
2023	1 November	Madonna	The Celebration Tour
2023	2 November	Madonna	The Celebration Tour
2023	4 November	El Barrio	Gira Atemporal
2023	4 November	La Pegatina	Gira 20 aniversario
2023	9 November	Jay Wheeler	Emociones World Tour
2023	10 November	Rels B	—
2023	11 November	Funzo & Babyloud	—
2023	17 November	Destripando la Historia	Loki Tour
2023	18 November	Pablo Alborán	Tour La Cua4rta Hoja
2023	22 November	Peso Pluma	Doble P Tour
2023	25 November	31 FAM	
2023	2 December	Raphael	Gira 2023
2023	3 December	Greta Van Fleet	Starcatcher World Tour
2023	7 December	Morat	Si Ayer Fuera Hoy
2023	9 December	Alejandro Sanz	Sanz en Vivo
2023	22 December	Ana Mena	Bellodrama Tour
2023	22 December	Melendi	20 Años Sin Noticias
2023	23 December	Melendi	20 Años Sin Noticias
2023	30 December	Isabel Pantoja	Gira 50 Años
2024	19 January	Morad	MDLR Tour
2024	20 January	Joan Dausà	Jo Mai Mai Tour
2024	20 January	Morad	MDLR Tour
2024	21 January	Morad	MDLR Tour
2024	22 January	Simple Plan	Hard As Rock Tour
2024	26 January	Kidd Keo	Bando Boyz Tour
2024	27 January	Soto Asa	999 Tour
2024	29 January	Laura Pausini	World Tour 2023-24
2024	3 February	Sen Senra	
2024	9 February	Bad Gyal	La Joia 24 Karats Tour
2024	9 February	Viva Suecia	
2024	10 February	Cultura Profética	
2024	17 February	Dreamcatcher	Luck Inside 7 Doors
2024	2 March	Idles	LOVE IS THE FING Tour
2024	8 March	Milo J	Milo J en España
2024	9 March	Los Chichos	Hasta Aquí Hemos Llegado
2024	16 March	Depeche Mode	Memento Mori World Tour
2024	17 March	Mother Mother	Europe 2024 Tour
2024	22 March	Nicki Nicole	Abre Su Alma Tour
2024	2 April	Jason Derulo	Nu King World Tour
2024	4 April	Fletcher	2024 Tour
2024	20 April	Nil Moliner	Libertad Tour
2024	21 April	Ha*Ash	Gira Mi Salida Contigo
2024	24 April	Hans Zimmer	The World of Hans Zimmer
2024	25 April	Parov Stelar	Theater Tour
2024	26 April	Andy & Lucas	Gira de Despedida
2024	27 April	Andy & Lucas	Gira de Despedida
2024	30 April	Andrea Bocelli	2024 Tour
2024	1 May	Andrea Bocelli	2024 Tour
2024	4 May	Saiko	Sakura Tour
2024	17 May	Raule	Zurdo Tour
2024	18 May	Manolo García	Gira 2024
2024	19 May	Tan Biónica	La Última Noche Mágica Tour
2024	20 May	Tate McRae	Think Later World Tour
2024	23 May	Eladio Carrión	Sol María Tour
2024	1 June	Operación Triunfo 2023	OT 2023 en Concierto
2024	2 June	Operación Triunfo 2023	OT 2023 en Concierto
2024	7 June	Ive	Show What I Have World Tour
2024	8 June	Galvan Real	Tour 2024
2024	9 June	Maná	México Lindo y Querido Tour
2024	13 June	Judas Priest	Europe Tour
2024	14 June	Marc Anthony	Historia Tour
2024	15 June	David Bisbal	Tour Volaré
2024	18 June	Olivia Rodrigo	Guts World Tour
2024	30 June	Eufòria	Eufòria en Concert
2024	3 July	Camilo	España Tour
2024	4 July	Myriam Hernández	Invencible World Tour
2024	6 July	Pearl Jam	Dark Matter World Tour
2024	8 July	Pearl Jam	Dark Matter World Tour
2024	12 July	Christian Nodal	Tour 2024
2024	14 July	Emilia	.MP3 Tour
2024	17 July	Luis Miguel	Luis Miguel Tour 2023-24
2024	18 July	Luis Miguel	Luis Miguel Tour 2023-24
2024	20 July	Ricky Martin	Ricky Martin Live
2024	5 September	Aventura	Cerrando Ciclos
2024	6 September	Aventura	Cerrando Ciclos
2024	14 September	Residente	Las Letras Ya No Importan Tour
2024	16 September	Girl in Red	Doing it Again Tour
2024	26 September	Jonas Brothers	Five Albums. One Night. The World Tour
2024	27 September	Okean Elzy	30th Anniversary Tour
2024	28 September	Niña Pastori	Camino Tour
2024	5 October	Melanie Martinez	The Trilogy Tour
2024	8 October	David Garrett	Alive Tour
2024	10 October	Meute	Meute Empor
2024	17 October	God Save the Queen	2024 Tour
2024	18 October	Estopa	Gira 25 Aniversario
2024	24 October	Nick Cave and the Bad Seeds	The Wild God Tour
2024	4 November	Jacob Collier	Djesse UK & Europe Tour
2024	9 November	La Casa Azul	Tour 2024
2024	12 November	Bryan Adams	So Happy It Hurts Tour
2024	15 November	The Tyets	Èpic Solete Tour
2024	16 November	The Tyets	Èpic Solete Tour
2024	23 November	Within Temptation	Bleed Out Tour
2024	30 November	Manolo Garcia	Gira 2024
2024	30 November	Pignoise	Gira 20 Aniversario
2024	13 December	Melendi	20 Años Sin Noticias
2024	14 December	Melendi	20 Años Sin Noticias
2024	27 December	Melendi	20 Años Sin Noticias
2024	27 December	Arde Bogotá	Tour 2024
2024	28 December	Arde Bogotá	Tour 2024
2025	3 January	Morad	Tour 2025
2025	10 January	Yung Beef	El Día de la Bestia
2025	11 January	María Becerra	
2025	17 January	Antoñito Molina	Tour 2025
2025	18 January	Milo J	La Vida Era Más Corta Tour
2025	24 January	Fermin Muguruza	
2025	25 January	Carolina Durante	Elige Tu Propia Aventura
2025	26 January	Carolina Durante	Elige Tu Propia Aventura
2025	7 February	Ateez	Towards the Light: Will to Power
2025	7 February	Sidonie	
2025	8 February	3 SUD EST	
2025	13 February	Alberto Plaza	
2025	13-16 February	Disney on Ice	Disney on Ice: Mickey y sus Amigos
2025	15 February	Dani Fernández	—
2025	16 February	Tiago PZK	
2025	21 February	Amaia	Si abro los ojos no es real
2025	22 February	Amaia	Si abro los ojos no es real
2025	28 February	Recycled J	
2025	1 March	Andy & Lucas	
2025	7 March	Rels B	A New Star World Tour
2025	8 March	Rels B	A New Star World Tour
2025	8 March	Trueno	
2025	14 March	Kidd Keo	
2025	15 March	Maluma	+Pretty +Dirty World Tour
2025	16 March	Jhay Cortez	Murci City Tour
2025	20 March	TXT	
2025	21 March	Mushkaa	Tour 2025
2025	22 March	Maka	Aura Tour
2025	March 27-April 6	Cirque du Soleil	Cirque du Soleil - Corteo
2025	28 March	Pole	KM0 Tour
2025	3 April	Dei V	
2025	4 April	Dei V	
2025	5 April	YSY A	
2025	12 April	Álvaro de Luna	
2025	22 April	Twenty One Pilots	The Clancy World Tour
2025	25 April	Paulo Londra	
2025	26 April	Cris MJ	Apocalipsis Tour
2025	29 April	Nicky Jam, Luis Fonsi, Arcángel	Energy Fest
2025	23 May	Young Miko	Baby Miko Tour
2025	27 May	Ca7riel & Paco Amoroso	Bañomaria Tour
2025	28 May	Myke Towers	Europe Tour
2025	29 May	Myke Towers	Europe Tour
2025	30 May	Cano	Triana Tour
2025	4 June	Chayanne	Bailemos Otra Vez Tour
2025	7 June	Erreway	Juntos Otra Vez Tour
2025	13 June	Amaral	
2025	14 June	Billie Eilish	Hit Me Hard and Soft: The Tour
2025	15 June	Billie Eilish	Hit Me Hard and Soft: The Tour
2025	26 June	Pablo López	360 Tour
2025	28 June	Rigoberta Bandini	Jesucrista Superstar Tour
2025	29 June	Ado	Hibana World Tour
2025	3 July	Miguel Bosé	Importante Tour
2025	5 July	Fito Páez	Gira España
2025	9 July	Marc Anthony	Marc Anthony en Vivo
2025	11 July	Rauw Alejandro	Cosa Nuestra World Tour
2025	12 July	Rauw Alejandro	Cosa Nuestra World Tour
2025	13 July	Juan Luis Guerra	
2025	15 July	Jennifer Lopez	Up All Night
2025	17 July	Camila	Regresa Tour
2025	26 July	Santana	
2025	8 September	Quevedo	Buenas Noches Tour
2025	9 September	Quevedo	Buenas Noches Tour
2025	17 September	Ke Personajes	
2025	18 September	Enrique Bunbury	
2025	20 September	Sebastián Yatra	Entre Tanta Gente Summer Tour
2025	21 September	Damiano David	DD World Tour
2025	23 September	Mora	Lo Mismo Otra Vez Tour
2025	2 October	Joaquín Sabina	Hola y Adiós
2025	4 October	Joaquín Sabina	Hola y Adiós
2025	4 October	Delaossa	La Madrugá Tour
2025	10 October	Manuel Carrasco	Tour Salvaje
2025	11 October	Saiko	Natsukashii Yoru
2025	11 October	Manuel Turizo	Tour 2025
2025	18 October	Los Planetas	
2025	18 October	Babasónicos	
2025	24 October	Duki	Ameri World Tour
2025	25 October	Vanesa Martín	Gira Casa mía
2025	25 October	Ojete Calor	Gira solo para gente guapa
2025	26 October	Los Pecos	Dos Voces y Una Historia
2025	26 October	Mala Rodríguez	Lujo Iberico Vivo
2025	28 October	Lady Gaga	The Mayhem Ball
2025	29 October	Lady Gaga	The Mayhem Ball
2025	31 October	Lady Gaga	The Mayhem Ball
2025	30 October	Volbeat	Greatest of All Tours
2025	1 November	The Hives	World Tour 2025
2025	2 November	Parkway Drive	European Tour
2025	6 November	Jamiroquai	The Heels of Steel Tour
2025	8 November	Belén Aguilera	
2025	8 November	Leiva	Gigante Tour
2025	9 November	Katy Perry	The Lifetimes Tour
2025	13 November	Till Lindemann	Meine Welt Tour
2025	14 November	Lágrimas de Sangre	Gira Comiat
2025	15 November	Lágrimas de Sangre	Gira Comiat
2025	16 November	Roxette	In concert 2025
2025	19 November	Latin Mafia	
2025	20 November	Haze	
2025	22 November	Anuel AA	Europe Tour 2025
2025	22 November	Él Mató a un Policia Motorizado	
2025	23 November	Mumford & Sons	The Rushmere Tour
2025	24 November	Turnstile	Never Enough Tour
2025	26 November	Anuel AA	Europe Tour 2025
2025	27 November	Crystal Fighters	
2025	28 November	Blessd	Blessd Tour
2025	28 November	Antonio Orozco	La Gira de Mi Vida
2025	29 November	Antonio Orozco	La Gira de Mi Vida
2025	29 November	Big Time Rush	In Real Life Worldwide Tour
2025	30 November	Tom Odell	Wonderful Life Tour
2025	19 December	Mónica Naranjo	Greatest Hits Tour
2025	20 December	Raphael	Raphaelísimo
2025	23 December	David Bisbal	Todo es Posible en Navidad
2025	27 December	Nil Moliner	Lugar Paraíso Tour
2025	28 December	Los Pecos	Dos Voces y Una Historia
2026	15 January	Rusowsky	
2026	16 January	Rusowsky	
2026	16 January	Fito & Fitipaldis	Aullidos Tour
2026	17 January	Fito & Fitipaldis	Aullidos Tour
2026	18 January	Milo J	La Vida Era Más Corta Tour
2026	22 January	Electric Callboy	2026 Tour
2026	24 January	Alcalá Norte	
2026	24 January	Eladio Carrión	Don Kbrn Tour
2026	31 January	André Rieu	
2026	13 February	Raye	This Tour May Contain New Music
2026	14 February	Nathy Peluso	Grasa Tour
2026	14 February	Fernando Costa	
2026	19-22 February	Disney on Ice	Disney on Ice: Mickey y sus Amigos
2026	20 February	Mikel Izal	
2026	22 February	Luis Cortés	
2026	25 February	Sombr	The Late Nights & Young Romance Tour
2026	26 February	Judeline	International Tour
2026	28 February	Maldita Nerea	15 Años y un Secreto
2026	8 March	Dei V	
2026	11 March	Cuarteto de Nos	Tour Puertas
2026	14 March	Dani Fernández	La Insurrección Tour
2026	14 March	Celtas Cortos	40 Años Contando Cuentos
2026	20 March	Marlena	
2026	20 March	Bad Gyal	Más Cara Tour
2026	21 March	Bad Gyal	Más Cara Tour
2026	21 March	La La Love You	Tour 2026
2026	22 March	Bad Gyal	Más Cara Tour
2026	27 March	Ralphie Choo	
2026	27 March	Hans Zimmer	The Next Level Tour
2026	2 April	Laura Pausini	Yo Canto World Tour
2026	8 April	Tame Impala	Deadbeat Tour
2026	10 April	Los Delinqüentes	El sentimiento garrapatero que nos traen las flores
2026	10 April	Luck Ra	
2026	11 April	En Tol Sarmiento	Bihotzen Konkista
2026	12 April	Louis Tomlinson	How Did We Get Here? World Tour
2026	13 April	Rosalía	Lux Tour
2026	15 April	Rosalía	Lux Tour
2026	17 April	Rosalía	Lux Tour
2026	18 April	Rosalía	Lux Tour
2026	21 April	Valery Meladze	Meladze Tour
2026	24 April	Rüfüs du Sol	
2026	25 April	Dani Martín	Gira 25 P*t*s Años
2026	25 April	Pau Vallvé	
2026	2 May	Eros Ramazzotti	Una Storia Importante
2026	8 May	La Plazuela	
2026	9 May	Pablo Alborán	Global Tour KM0
2026	10 May	Eric Clapton	European Tour
2026	12 May	Twice	This Is For World Tour
2026	14 May	Iván Ferreiro	Hoy x Ayer
2026	15 May	Natos y Waor	Hijos de la Ruina Tour
2026	16 May	Kidd Keo	
2026	17 May	Rawayana	
2026	26 May	Madison Beer	The Locket Tour
2026	31 May	Eufòria	Eufòria en concert
2026	16 June	Ludovico Einaudi	
2026	18 June	Kany Garcia	
2026	10 July	Operación Triunfo 2025	OT 2025 en concierto
2026	11 July	La Reina del Flow	La Reina del Flow en Concierto
2026	12 July	Carlos Rivera	Viva México! En concierto
2026	13 July	Molotov, Mala Rodríguez	Molotov Tour Europa 2026
2026	17 July	Yandel	Yandel Sinfónico
2026	22 July	Chayanne	Bailemos Otra Vez Tour
2026	4 September	Aitana	Cuarto Azul World Tour
2026	5 September	Aitana	Cuarto Azul World Tour
2026	7 September	Aitana	Cuarto Azul World Tour
2026	8 September	Aitana	Cuarto Azul World Tour
2026	10 September	Ca7riel & Paco Amoroso	Free Spirits World Tour
2026	2 October	Vetusta Morla	Gira de Vuelta, Canciones de Ida
2026	4 October	Hombres G	Los Mejores Años de Nuestra Vida
2026	13 October	Trueno	
2026	14 October	Leoni Torres	Gracias Por Tanto Tour
2026	16 October	Morat	Ya Es Mañana Tour
2026	17 October	Morat	Ya Es Mañana Tour
2026	16 October	La Fúmiga	Tot s'acaba
2026	17 October	La Fúmiga	Tot s'acaba
2026	18 October	La Fúmiga	Tot s'acaba
2026	19 October	Deep Purple	SPLAT! World Tour
2026	20 October	The Strokes	Reality Awaits the World, 2026 Tour
2026	21 October	Synthony	2026 Europe Tour
2026	22 October	Morgenshtern	Alisher World Tour
2026	23 October	Serko	125km Tour
2026	24 October	Fontaines D.C.	D.C. EU Tour
2026	25 October	Niall Horan	Dinner Party: Live on Tour
2026	26 October	Simple Plan	
2026	28 October	Jungle	
2026	29 October	Serko	125km Tour
2026	30 October	Valeria Castro	
2026	31 October	Jorge Drexler	
2026	31 October	Divididos	
2026	1 November	Melendi	Pop Rock Tour
2026	2 November	Melendi	Pop Rock Tour
2026	4 November	Pitbull	I'm Back!
2026	4 November	Medina Azahara	Hasta siempre Cataluña
2026	6 November	John Pollõn	La gira láctea
2026	6 November	La Oreja de Van Gogh	Tantas Cosas que Contar Tour
2026	7 November	La Oreja de Van Gogh	Tantas Cosas que Contar Tour
2026	7 November	Joe Bonamassa	Live in Concert
2026	12 November	Miranda!	Nuevo Hotel Miranda!
2026	13 November	Amon Amarth	
2026	13 November	Camela	Tour 2026
2026	14 November	Bryan Adams	Roll with the Punches
2026	14 November	Mälmo 040	
2026	26 November	Luck Ra	
2026	26 November	La Oreja de Van Gogh	Tantas Cosas que Contar Tour
2026	27 November	La Oreja de Van Gogh	Tantas Cosas que Contar Tour
2026	27 November	Los Fabulosos Cadillacs	
2026	28 November	Carolina Durante	Fin de la aventura
2026	28 November	Chiara Oliver	No Fue Real Tour
2026	29 November	Galván Real	10 Años Contigo
2026	18 December	Amaral	
2026	20 December	Amaia	Amaia Arenas Tour
2026	22 December	Antonio Orozco	
2026	30 December	OBK	
2027
2027	22 January	Tini	Futttura World Tour
2027	23 January	Tini	Futttura World Tour
2027	24 January	Tini	Futttura World Tour
2027	19 March	Dani Martín	Gira 25 P*t*s Años
2027	20 March	Dani Martín	Gira 25 P*t*s Años
2027	1 May	Olivia Rodrigo	The Unraveled Tour
2027	2 May	Olivia Rodrigo	The Unraveled Tour
2027	5 May	Olivia Rodrigo	The Unraveled Tour
2027	6 May	Olivia Rodrigo	The Unraveled Tour
2027	21 May	Pablo López	Hibakusha Tour
2027	27 May	Gracie Abrams	The Look at My Life Tour
2027	28 May	Gracie Abrams	The Look at My Life Tour
2027	31 May	Quevedo	El Baifo Tour
2027	1 June	Quevedo	El Baifo Tour
2027	11 June	David Bisbal	Tour Eternos
2027	1 July	Quevedo	El Baifo Tour
2027	2 July	Quevedo	El Baifo Tour
2027	3 July	Quevedo	El Baifo Tour
2027	5 July	Quevedo	El Baifo Tour
2027	6 July	Quevedo	El Baifo Tour
2027	7 July	Quevedo	El Baifo Tour
2028	30 April	Eros Ramazzotti	Una Historia Importante World Tour

==== Most performed concerts by artists ====
#	Performer(s)	Quantity	Year(s)
1	Alejandro Sanz	16	1998, 2001, 2004, 2007, 2010, 2013, 2015, 2016, 2023
2	David Bisbal	15 (Note: 4 as part of Operación Triunfo.)	2002, 2004, 2013, 2014, 2016, 2017, 2018, 2021, 2024, 2025, 2027
3	Joaquín Sabina	14	2000, 2006, 2009, 2010, 2014, 2015, 2017, 2020, 2023, 2025
3	Melendi	14	2013, 2015, 2017, 2018, 2022, 2023, 2024, 2026
4	Dani Martín	13 (Note: 7 as part of El Canto del Loco.)	2004, 2005, 2006, 2008, 2009, 2018, 2021, 2022, 2026, 2027
5	Aitana	12 (Note: 3 as part of Operación Triunfo 2017.)	2018, 2019, 2021, 2022, 2023, 2026
5	Quevedo	12	2023, 2025, 2027
6	Depeche Mode	11	1990, 1993, 1998, 2001, 2006, 2009, 2014, 2017, 2024
6	Estopa	11	2001, 2002, 2004, 2006, 2008, 2012, 2015, 2016, 2019, 2024
6	Fito & Fitipaldis	11	2005, 2006, 2007, 2009, 2014, 2015, 2018, 2022
6	Pablo Alborán	11	2013, 2015, 2018, 2023, 2026
7	Eros Ramazzotti	10	1990, 1991, 2004, 2010, 2013, 2016, 2019, 2023, 2026, 2028
8	Bryan Adams	9	1996, 1999, 2003, 2005, 2016, 2019, 2022, 2024, 2026
8	Luis Miguel	9	1998, 1999, 2002, 2004, 2007, 2018, 2024
9	Lady Gaga	8	2010, 2012, 2014, 2018, 2025
9	Madonna	8	2001, 2012, 2015, 2023
9	Rosalía	8	2019, 2022, 2026
9	Tini	8 (Note: 5 as part of Violetta.)	2013, 2015, 2023, 2027
10	Elton John	7	1993, 2003, 2009, 2014, 2017, 2023
10	Miguel Bosé	7	1990, 2000, 2005, 2010, 2012, 2015, 2025
10	Raphael	7	2009, 2017, 2018, 2019, 2021, 2023, 2025
10	Roger Waters	7	2002, 2007, 2011, 2018, 2023
10	U2	7	1992, 2001, 2015
11	Eric Clapton	6	1995, 1998, 2001, 2004, 2026
11	Hombres G	6	2003, 2005, 2009, 2015, 2023, 2026
11	Juan Luis Guerra	6	1993, 2008, 2015, 2019, 2023, 2025
11	La Oreja de Van Gogh	6	2001, 2006, 2026
11	Laura Pausini	6	1997, 2009, 2012, 2018, 2024, 2026
11	Shakira	6	1997, 2002, 2006, 2010, 2018
12	Bad Gyal	5	2023, 2024, 2026
12	Hans Zimmer	5	2019, 2024, 2026, 2027
12	Roxette	5	1994, 2001, 2011, 2015, 2025
12	Joan Manuel Serrat	5	2003, 2020, 2022
12	Maluma	5	2016, 2017, 2018, 2022, 2025
12	Manuel Carrasco	5	2016, 2019, 2022, 2023, 2025
12	Olivia Rodrigo	5	2024, 2027
12	Sopa de Cabra	5	1991, 2011, 2022
12	Pablo López	5	2018, 2021, 2023, 2025, 2027

== Sant Jordi Club ==
The 3,000-seat Sant Jordi Club opened in and is located behind the main building.

== See also ==
- Estadi Olímpic Lluís Companys
- List of indoor arenas in Spain
- List of tennis stadiums by capacity

== Notes ==
Preceded by SkyDome; Toronto	IAAF World Indoor Championships; Venue; 1995	Succeeded by Palais Omnisports; Paris
Preceded by Hong Kong Coliseum; Hong Kong	FIFA Futsal World Championship; Final Venue; 1996	Succeeded by Domo Polideportivo de la CDAG; Guatemala City
Preceded by Olympic Indoor Hall; Athens	FIBA EuroBasket; Final Venue; 1997	Succeeded by Palais Omnisports; Paris
Preceded by PalaEur; Rome	FIBA Euroleague; Final Four Venue; 1998	Succeeded by Olympiahalle; Munich
Preceded by Acropolis Exhibition Hall; Nice	Davis Cup; Final Venue; 2000	Succeeded by Rod Laver Arena; Melbourne
Preceded by PalaMalaguti; Bologna	EuroLeague; Final Four Venue; 2003	Succeeded by Yad Eliyahu Sports Hall; Tel Aviv
Preceded by Prefectural Pool; Fukuoka	World Aquatics Championships; Main Venue; 2003	Succeeded by Parc Jean-Drapeau; Montreal
Preceded by Polideportivo Islas Malvinas; Mar del Plata	Davis Cup; Final Venue; 2009	Succeeded by Belgrade Arena; Belgrade
Preceded by Palais Omnisports; Paris	EuroLeague; Final Four Venue; 2011	Succeeded by Sinan Erdem Dome; Istanbul
Preceded by Malmö Arena; Malmö	World Men's Handball Championship; Final Venue; 2013	Succeeded by Lusail Sports Arena; Lusail
Preceded by Shanghai Oriental Sports Center; Shanghai	World Aquatics Championships; Main Venue; 2013	Succeeded by Kazan Aquatic Sports Palace; Kazan
