= Sangtraït =

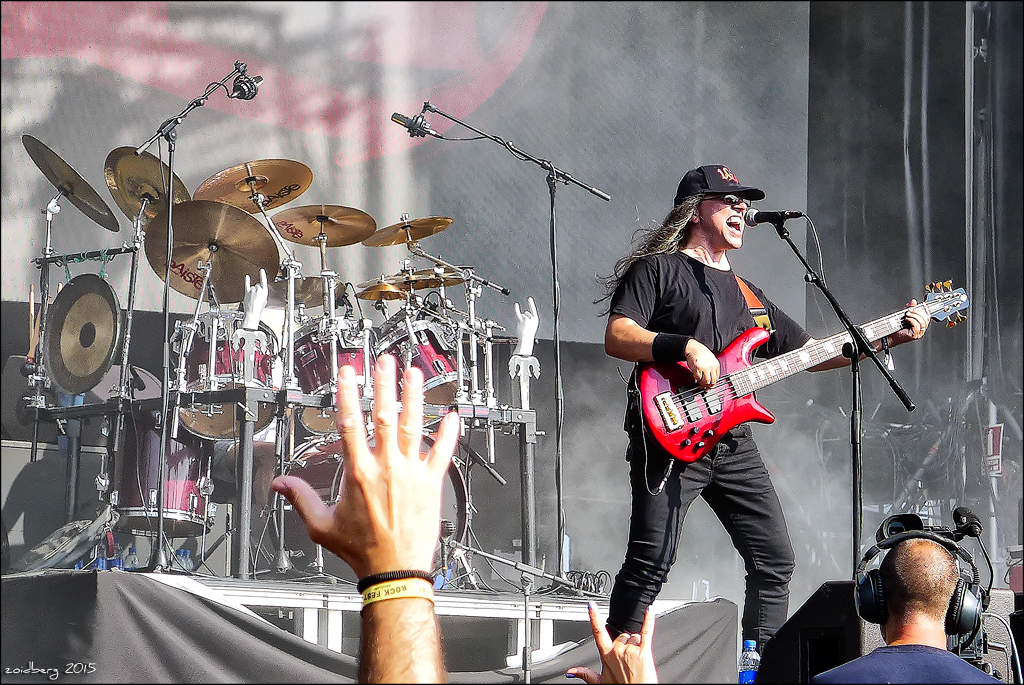
- Quim Mandado with LGP at Rock Fest Barcelona in 2015

Background information
- Origin: La Jonquera, Catalonia
- Genres: Hard rock, Heavy metal
- Years active: 1982–2002
- Labels: Picap
- Website: Official website

Sangtraït was a Catalan hard rock and heavy metal band with occasional fantasy and medieval influences, combined sporadically with contemporary themes. Formed in 1982 in La Jonquera, they stood out from other bands of their generation.

They achieved significant popularity in the late 1980s and throughout the 1990s, thanks to songs such as "El vol de l'home ocell" (*The Flight of the Bird-Man*), "Somnis entre boires" (*Dreams Amidst the Fog*), and "Els senyors de les pedres" (*The Lords of the Stones*).

The band disbanded on 20 December 2001 with a farewell concert at Razzmatazz in Barcelona.

== History ==
=== 1979–1988 ===
In the summer of 1979, the early band began forming at the home of Quim Mandado in La Jonquera. He started playing the piano, accompanied by Josep M. Coro on classical guitar. Both were 17 years old and shared musical interests such as blues and rock.

As rehearsals grew, other members joined: La Lupe, Papa Juls, Xavi Rodriguez, and an initial French drummer, Patrick. They often played blues and some Beatles covers. La Lupe decided to stay in Empordà after a joyful summer filled with friends and music.

To fund better instruments, some members became firefighters, hoping to have spare time to practice music while waiting for emergencies. After intense rehearsals, they performed publicly in Capmany as Los Bomberos Atómicos, covering rock'n'roll standards, including a Catalan version of "The House of the Rising Sun" by the Animals.

This early lineup laid the foundation for Sangtraït: La Lupe on guitar and vocals, Quim on bass, Josep M. on guitar, Xavier Rodríguez on keyboards, and his brother Víctor on drums. Papa Juls alternated between La Jonquera and Agullana for theatre projects, always carrying his harmonica. Other early collaborators included Valentín López, Emerio Marc, F. Solà, and Marc González, who would become the official singer.

=== 1988–1992 ===
In 1988, Marc Gonzàlez left the band, and Quim Mandado took over as singer. La Lupe and Martín Rodríguez presented a demo with three songs: "El Vol de l'home ocell" (*The Flight of the Bird-Man*), "Els senyors de les pedres" (*The Lords of the Stones*), and "Buscant una dona" (*Looking for a Woman*).

Picap eventually funded the recording of their first album, Els Senyors de les Pedres (*The Lords of the Stones*) at Aurha Studios in Esplugues. It sold around 10,000 copies and led to more than thirty concerts. They also contributed "Neu" (*Snow*) to the Christmas compilation Tocats del Nadal.

In 1990, they released their second album Terra de Vents (*Land of Winds*), featuring songs like "Sang en el fang" (*Blood in the Mud*), "Inqui-missió" (*Inquiry Mission*), and "Terra de vents" (*Land of Winds*). They played their first Barcelona concert at Studio 54 on 17 May.

In 1991, they recorded L'Últim Segell (*The Last Seal*), selling 90,000 copies and performing 120 concerts, including a historic show on 14 June at Palau Sant Jordi with Sopa de Cabra, Sau, and Els Pets, attended by 22,104 people. A live album and video, Sangtraït al Palau Sant Jordi, were released from this concert.

=== 1993–2000 ===
In 1993, they recorded their fifth album Contes i Llegendes (*Tales and Legends*) with contributions from Jordi Armengol and Lluís Llach, who sang a tribute to Freddie Mercury.

In 1994, the band did not record an album but participated in the 20th anniversary of Companyia Elèctrica Dharma with "Ciutats" (*Cities*) and performed in Madrid. In 1995, they released Eclipsi (*Eclipse*), reflecting the decline of the Catalan rock movement, and introduced a CD-ROM with information about the band.

At the end of 1996, Noctàmbulus (*Nightwalker*) was released with a controversial cover featuring an angel and a devil kissing. They also launched their official website, maintained by guitarist Josep M. Corominas.

In 1997, they recorded a Catalan version of Elvis Presley's "Burning Love" for the compilation Tributo al Rey. In 1999, they returned for a tribute to Carles Sabater at Palau Sant Jordi and released L'altre Cantó del Mirall (*The Other Side of the Mirror*), with the single "El bosc de formigó" (*The Concrete Forest*).

=== 2001: Farewell ===
Their farewell concert took place on 20 December 2001 at Razzmatazz in Barcelona. A live album, L'Últim Concert (*The Last Concert*), was released. Their final official gathering occurred on 5 September 2002 at Sala Mephisto in Barcelona, presenting the double album and DVD of the farewell concert.

Picap released the rarities album Entre Amics (*Among Friends*) in 2003, and a compilation of ballads, Crits de Silenci (*Silent Cries*), in 2005. Rumors of reunions persisted, but nothing was officially confirmed. In 2013, journalist Ivan Allué published a full biography of the band.

=== Post-band projects ===
- Martín Rodríguez released AM/FM with Rockson in 2003.
- Quim Mandado released a solo album, Eclosió (*Eclosion*) in 2003.
- Lupe Villar participated in Kcor D Rock (2008) with XII AMC, featuring translations of heavy metal songs into Catalan. In 2020, she released "Profanacció" (*Profanation*) with Lupe Villar & The Rejects.
- In 2009, Martín Rodríguez and Quim Mandado, with Joan Cardoner, formed "Los Guardianes del Puente" (later LGP), releasing two albums before disbanding in 2020 after Rodríguez's death.
- In 2012, Josep Maria Coromines and Martín Rodríguez formed Barbablanca.
- In 2011, Papa Juls created Papa Juls Blues Band.
- In 2023, Quim Mandado formed a new band with his sons and Joan Cardoner, performing songs from Sangtraït, LGP, and his solo work.

== Milestones ==
- 3 January 2020: Martín Rodríguez died in Figueres at age 64. He was born on 14 September 1955 in Cumbres Mayores (Huelva).

== Members ==
=== 1982–1984 ===
- Marc Gonzàlez – vocals
- Quim Mandado – bass
- Josep M. Corominas – guitar
- Lupe Villar – guitar
- Papa Juls – harmonica
- Víctor Rodríguez – drums

=== 1985–1988 ===
- Marc Gonzàlez – vocals
- Quim Mandado – bass
- Josep M. Corominas – guitar
- Lupe Villar – guitar
- Papa Juls – harmonica
- Martín Rodríguez – drums

=== 1988–2001 ===
- Quim Mandado – vocals, bass, keyboards
- Josep M. Corominas – guitar
- Lupe Villar – guitar
- Papa Juls – harmonica, sax
- Martín Rodríguez – drums

== Discography ==
=== Studio albums ===
- Els Senyors de les Pedres (1988)
- Terra de Vents (1990)
- L'Últim Segell (1991)
- Contes i Llegendes (1993)
- Eclipsi (1995)
- Noctàmbulus (1996)
- L'Altre Cantó del Mirall (1999)

=== Live albums ===
- Al Palau Sant Jordi (live) (1992)
- L'Últim Concert (2002)

=== Video albums ===
- Vídeos, concerts i rock&roll DVD (2002)

=== Compilations / other releases ===
- Entre amics (2003)
- Crits de Silenci (2005)

== Other recordings ==
- "Neu" (*Snow*), from Tocats del Nadal (Picap, 1988)
- "Ciutats!" (*Cities!*), live with Companyia Elèctrica Dharma (Picap, 1994)
- "Foc d'amor" (*Fire of Love*), Catalan version of Elvis Presley's "Burning Love" (Picap, 1997)
- "És inútil continuar" (*It Is Useless to Continue*), tribute to Carles Sabater (Picap, 2000)
- "La gran nit del Sant Jordi 14 de juny de 1991" (*The Great Night of 14 June 1991 at Sant Jordi*), documentary of the Palau Sant Jordi concert
