= Razzmatazz (club) =

Nightclub and concert hall in Barcelona, Spain

- Razz
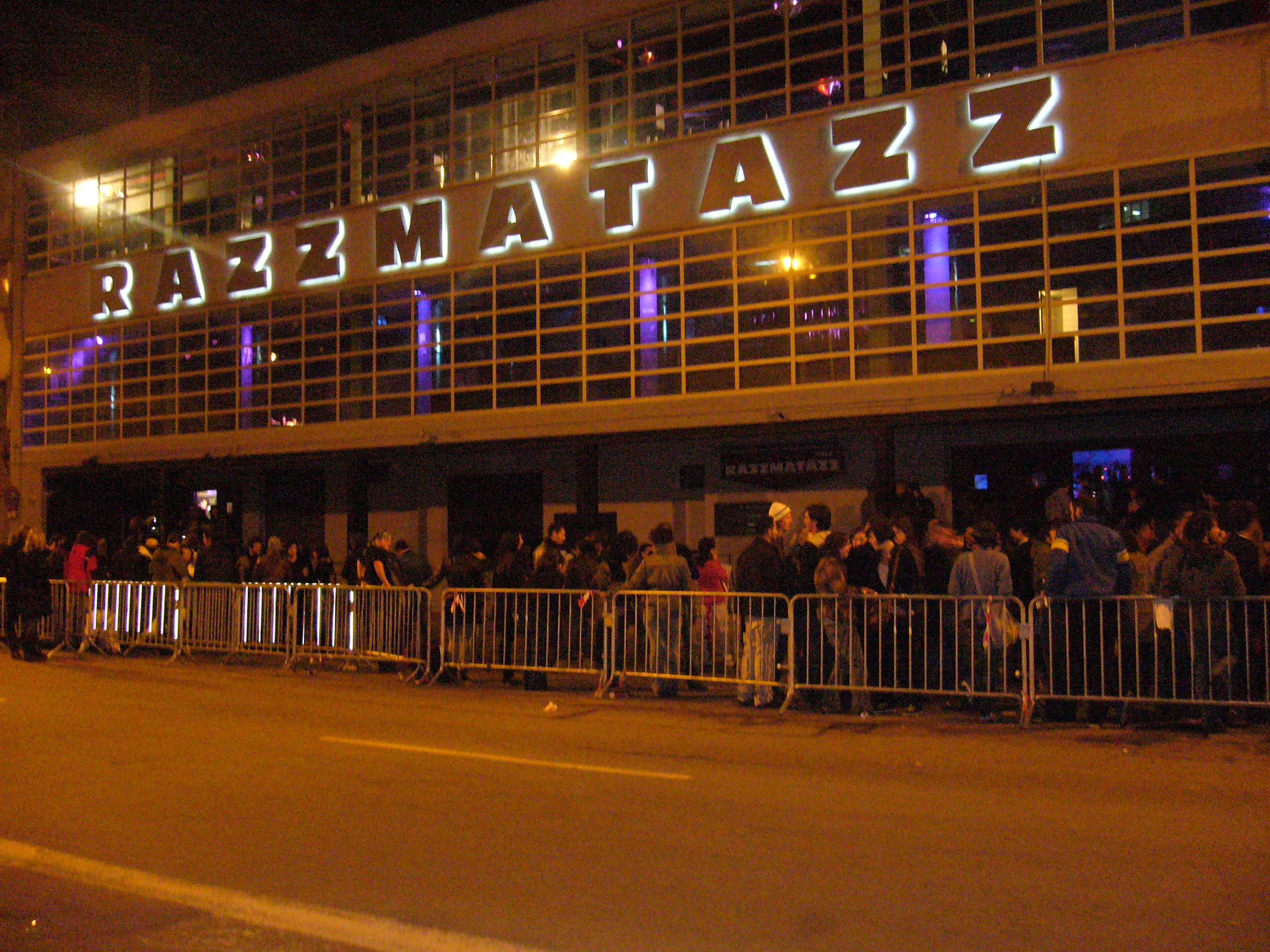
- Interactive map of Razzmatazz
- Location: Carrer Almogàvers, 122, 08018 Barcelona, Catalonia, Spain
- Coordinates: 41.39722°N 2.19111°E
- Owner: Daniel Faidella
- Operator: Associació de Sales de Concerts de Catalunya
- Capacity: 2,100 (Main Hall / Razzclub); 940 (Sala 2 / The Loft); 200 (Sala 3 / Lolita)
- Surface: 3.700 m^{2}
- Public transit: at Marina at Bogatell

Construction
- Built: 1986
- Opened: 2000

Razzmatazz (also known as Razz) is a nightclub and concert hall in the Poblenou neighbourhood in Barcelona, the capital of Catalonia, Spain. It is one of the city's biggest with a capacity of over 2,000 people in its main hall. The club is formed of five halls where different genres of music are played even though the most played are indie pop, alternative rock and electronic music. Razzmatazz is the "evolution" of the Sala Zeleste, which closed back in 2000 due to debts to the Social Security agency.

The club is named after the song "Razzmatazz" by Pulp. The Flaming Lips were the first artist to play the venue.

== History ==
In 1986, the historical Sala Zeleste at Carrer Platería was closed to open a new and much larger one at the Carrer Almogàvers in Poblenou. The new Sala Zeleste is located in the space previously occupied by two carpet and stamped factories. Then it maintains the appearance of a factory or loft, with three clear and very large rooms that can reach more than 3,000 people in total. The main hall had a capacity of 2,000 people, which turned Zeleste into one of the few major concert halls in Barcelona (without reaching the macro-concerts that can be done in the stadium, for example) and that therefore It offered the possibility of hosting concerts of highly successful formations. Some of those that have happened are Bad Gyal, Paul McCartney, Yoko Ono, James Taylor, Oasis, Europe, The Offspring, PJ Harvey, Tricky, Sugarcubes, Björk, Siouxie, Bauhaus, Juan Luis Guerra, Els Pets, Sopa de Cabra, Blur, Radiohead, Sangtraït, Phish etc.

The album "Loco Live" by The Ramones was recorded there in March 1991.

In the year 2000 the Sala Zeleste had a debt of about €780,000 with the Social Security plus a fairly small debt, of some €36,000, for rent, but sufficient to do them outside the premises. In the same year 2000, the room was renewed with new owners, a few cosmetic changes and a new name: the new Razzmatazz room was founded.
