= Sau (band) =

Catalonian music group (1986 to 1999)

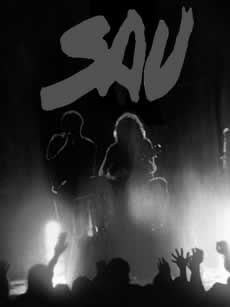

Background information
- Origin: Vilanova de Sau
- Genres: Pop rock
- Years active: 1986–1999
- Past members: Pep Sala; Carles Sabater; Carles Oliver; Joan Capdevila
- Website: carlessabater.com/sau

Sau was a music group from Catalonia, Spain, which rose to fame in the area in the 1990s, being among the first groups to write pop music with Catalan lyrics, known as rock català. The band's two main members were Carles Sabater, singer, and Pep Sala, who played guitar and sometimes keyboard. Sabater's death following a concert in 1999 ended the band's existence.

Pep Sala was the composer whilst lyrics were written together with Carles Sabater. No puc deixar de fumar (I cannot quit smoking) was their first album. Edited in 1988 by "Audiovisuals de Sarrià", the album contained the hits "Records d'Irlanda" ("Memories of Ireland") and the song "Deprimit" ("Depressed") which had an appearance on each subsequent album.

Two years later, the album What a night, recorded in London and Barcelona, confirmed the status of the group. That disc included Sau's most recognisable singles, "Boig per tu" ("Crazy for You") and "El Tren de Mitjanit" ("Midnight Train").

Sau participated in the historic concert on Palau Sant Jordi on June 14, 1991, together with Els Pets, Sopa de Cabra and Sangtraït. At the time, it had the European record for public attendance at a musical show held in a closed arena with 22,104 attending. Another of their most memorable concerts was held in the bullring La Monumental in July 1992 which was recorded for the album Concert de mitjanit (Midnight Concert).

== Discography ==
- No puc deixar de fumar (1987)
- Per la porta de servei (1989)
- Quina nit (1990)
- El més gran dels pecadors (1991)
- Concert de mitjanit (1992, live)
- Els singles (1992)
- Junts de nou per primer cop (1994)
- Cançons perdudes, rareses, remescles (1995, compilation album)
- Set (1996)
- Bàsic (1997, live)
- Amb la lluna a l'esquena (1998)
- Un grapat de cançons per si mai et fan falta (2003, a collection of three CDs containing a selection of Sala's 51 favourite songs)
