= Sopa de Cabra =

Catalan musical group

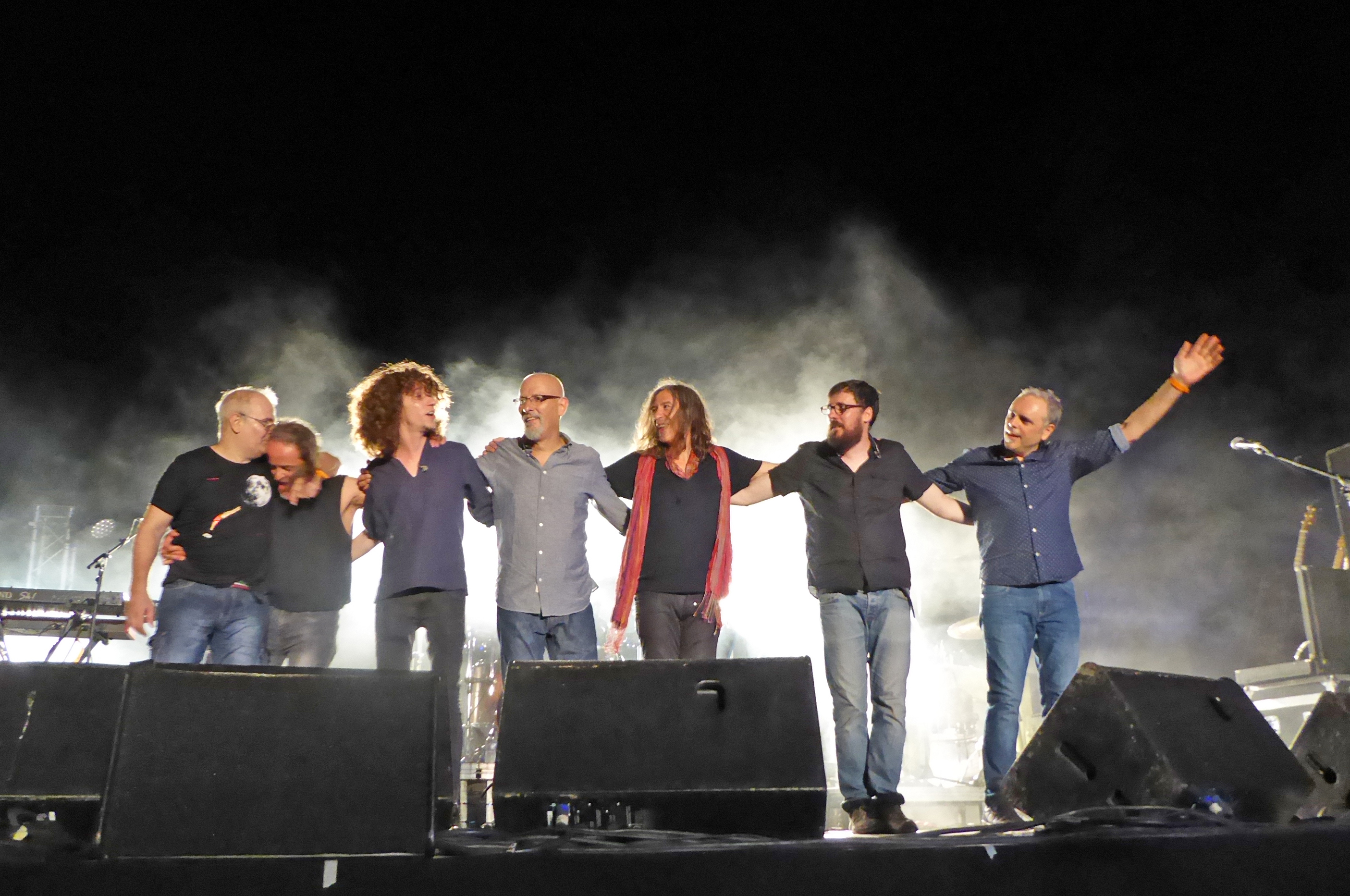
- Sopa de Cabra, July 2017. From left to right, Pep Bosch, Jaume Soler (Peck), Ricard Sohn, Francesc Lisicic (Cuco), Gerard Quintana, Valen Nieto, Josep Thió.

Background information
- Origin: Girona, Catalonia, Spain
- Genres: Rock, rock català
- Years active: 1986–2001 and September 2011; 2015–
- Labels: Salsetta Discos, BMG-Ariola, Música Global
- Members: Gerard Quintana; Josep Thió; Francesc 'Cuco' Lisicic; Josep Bosch; Jaume 'Peck' Soler; Ricard Sohn Colom; Valen Nieto
- Past members: Joan 'Ninyín' Cardona; Julio Lobos; Eduard Font; Xarim Aresté
- Website: www.sopadecabra.net

Sopa de Cabra ('Goat Soup') is a musical group from Girona, Catalonia, Spain, active from 1986 to 2002 and since 2015. They are considered to be one of the leading representatives of the rock català movement, though the band prefer not to be placed in the same category as other Catalan-language groups, some of whom had very different musical styles, simply on the basis of singing in Catalan. Sopa de Cabra's classic songs include L'Empordà, Camins ("Paths") and El Far del Sud ("The Southern Lighthouse").

In September 2011, the band reunited temporarily to mark the 25th anniversary of their formation and the tenth of their final performances with a tour of seven concerts. They reformed in 2015 and have since released two albums.

== History ==
=== Origins, 1979–1986 ===
Sopa de Cabra's origins can be traced to several bands formed in Girona in the early 1980s, and to the fact that all the members of what became Sopa de Cabra knew each other at that period. The band Copacabana, formed in 1979 by secondary school classmates, included Josep Thió, and was important because some of the early songs, including the classic L'Empordà, were originally written for Copacabana by its lead singer, Jaume Rufí, and Thió. This band dissolved in 1984 when Thió left to complete then-obligatory military service and Rufí went to study in Barcelona. Upon returning to Girona, Thió set about forming a new band, which would become Sopa de Cabra, recruiting bassist Francesc 'Cuco' Lisícic, guitarist Joan 'Ninyín' Cardona and drummer Josep 'Pep' Bosch. The line-up was completed with the addition of Gerard Quintana as lead singer. Cardona, Lisícic and Quintana had formerly worked together in 'Ninyín's Mine Workers Union Band', which may therefore also be seen as one of the direct progenitors of Sopa de Cabra. The name of the band ('Goat Soup'), was inspired by the 1973 Rolling Stones album Goat's Head Soup.

The basic line-up of the band as founded in 1986 remained virtually unchanged throughout its 15-year history. Julio Lobos became the regular keyboard player from 1994, and was succeeded in 1998 by Eduard Font. The guitarist Jaume Soler (‘Peck’) joined the group in 1997, because Joan Cardona's deteriorating state of health began to make it difficult for him to perform regularly. He was diagnosed with a genetically influenced form of colon cancer. Ninyín died on January 20, 2002, less than three months after the band's final concert in Barcelona, where he had managed to appear on stage for a few numbers. He was 42.

=== 1986–2001 ===
Sopa de Cabra's first album (Sopa de Cabra,) was released in 1989, and already included many songs that continued to be a regular part of the band's repertoire, such as L’Empordà, El boig de la ciutat, and El sexo, que me hace feliz (composed by ‘Ninyín’ Cardona and his brother Pau, with disarmingly joyful and explicit lyrics in Spanish). The second album, La Roda (‘The Wheel’) followed in 1990, by which time the group was well established as a significant force in Catalan popular music. Most of the band's material was original, with Quintana and Thió as the chief composers of lyrics and music.

In 1991, the live concert double album Ben Endins (‘Deep’) marked the first high point in the group's evolution. It includes many classic tracks and two interesting cover versions, respectively Led Zeppelin’s Rock’n’Roll (sung in English), and Bob Marley’s War, in a Catalan translation written by Quintana. 1991 also saw the band take part in a huge concert at the Palau Sant Jordi in Barcelona, which celebrated Catalan popular music and also featured the three other leading Catalan bands of the time, Sau, Els Pets and Sangtraït.

The decision to record an album entirely in Spanish was taken in a bid to widen the group’s appeal and sales further, but this experiment (Mundo Infierno, 1993) failed. The band had included some compositions in Spanish in their repertoire from the start (of the ten tracks on the first album, seven are in Catalan and three in Spanish), and were not at that time overtly political in their Catalan identity, but many fans saw the change of language as a betrayal, and made their opinions known. Mundo infierno was not a commercial success, and this period was a low point in the group's career. However, to anyone without partisan feelings about the linguistic and political landscape of Catalonia, the record is a fine one, with a darker and more haunting quality than its predecessors.

Six more albums followed between 1994 and 2001, during which time Sopa’s popularity and success recovered completely. The live album La nit des anys, 1997 (‘The night of the year’) moved away somewhat from the group's rock’n’roll roots, with the inclusion of additional singers and a wider range of instrumentation than the classic guitars, bass, drums and keyboards (strings, saxophone, harmonica, etc.). The final CD before the formal dissolution of Sopa de Cabra was Plou i fa sol (2001) (‘It is raining and sunny’). A tour culminated in three final concerts at the Razzmatazz club in Barcelona, in November 2001; a CD and DVD of this live performance came out in 2002, under the title of Bona nit, malparits! (‘Good night, bastards!’), a catch-phrase regularly used on stage by Quintana.

=== Since 2001 ===
All the members of the band have continued their musical careers, probably the most high-profile being that of Gerard Quintana, as a singer, writer, actor and radio presenter.

In 2003, another album, El llarg viatge (‘The long journey’), was released as a CD and DVD, based on recordings of the final 2001 tour. In 2006, five years after the formal disbanding of the group, other successful Catalan musicians compiled a tribute album, Podré tornar enrere. El tribut a Sopa de Cabra (‘I will be able to come back’), performing Sopa de Cabra's songs. Sopa de Cabra themselves came together again to record the final track, a new song with lyrics by Gerard Quintana and music by Josep Thió. Entitled seguirem somiant, (‘keep on dreaming’), it is a very moving and poignant piece in memory of Ninyín.

=== 2011 ===
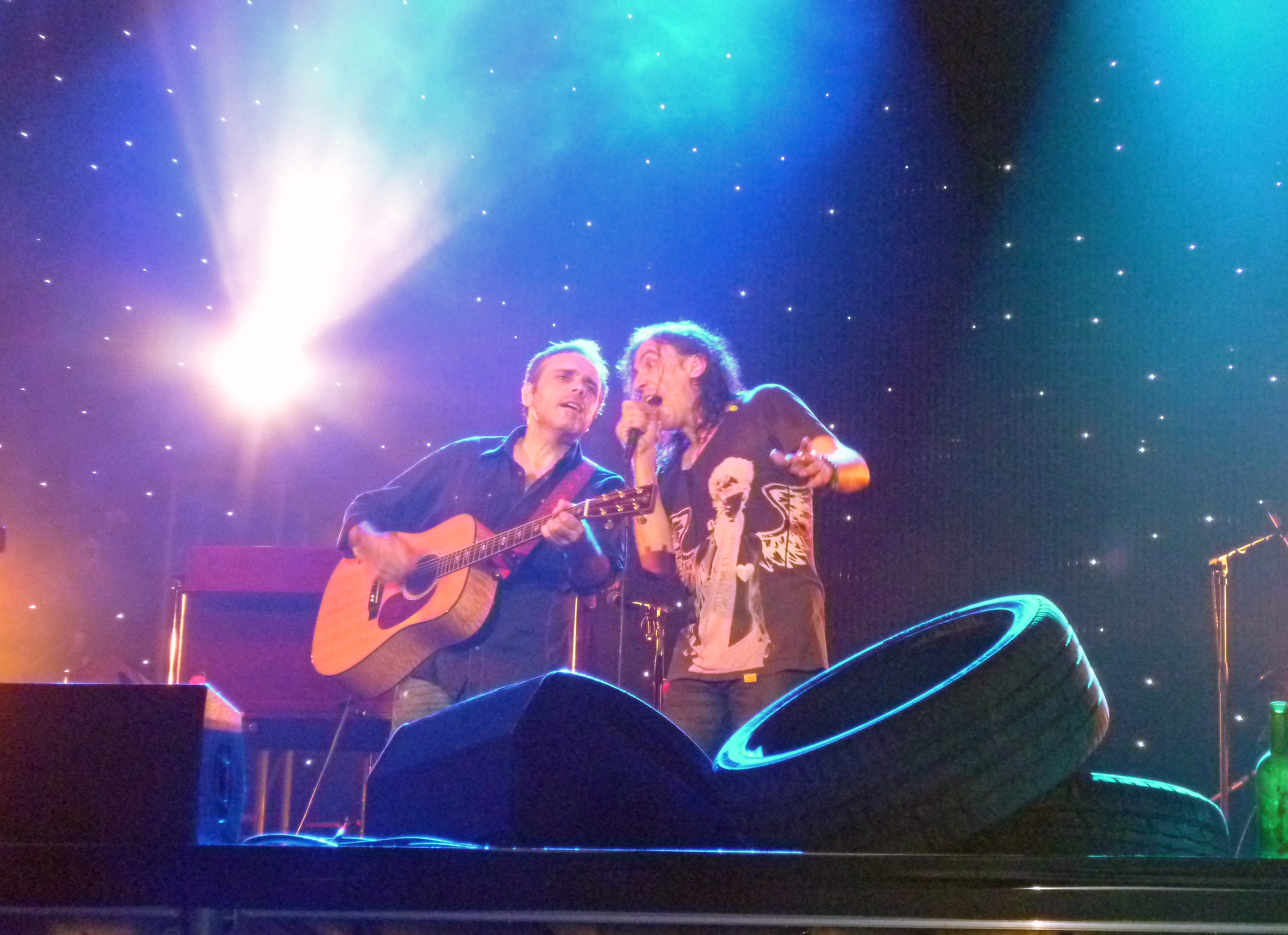
Josep Thió and Gerard Quintana on stage, October 1, 2011, in Girona

On March 2, 2011 Quintana, Thió, Lisicic, Bosch and Soler announced at a press conference that they would reunite for a single concert on September 9 at the Palau Sant Jordi in Barcelona. Subsequently, the high demand for tickets led to a second, and then a third, concert being arranged, for the three days 9, 10 and 11 September. The timing of this reunion in 2011 is significant, taking place twenty-five years after the formation of the band, twenty years after the major 1991 concert in Barcelona that featured all the leading elements in Catalan popular music, and ten years after Sopa's 'final concert' in 2001.

On July 5, the members of the group announced yet another concert in 2011, to be held in their home town of Girona on September 30, and two more concerts, in Palma and Tarragona, were announced later in July. A final, second concert in Girona on October 1 was announced in August, making seven gigs in all. The members of Sopa de Cabra in 2011 are the same as in 2001, including Eduard Font on keyboards, with the addition of one musician who belongs to a younger generation of Catalan music: Xarim Aresté, singer, guitarist and songwriter with the group Very Pomelo.

All seven concerts of the 2011 'anniversary' tour were sold out: over 65,000 tickets in all. The songs performed at the concerts were all from the original, 1980s-1990s repertoire of the group with the addition of Seguirem somiant, the haunting song written by Quintana and Thió in memory of their deceased friend and colleague, Joan Cardona. Ten years after the last public appearance of the band, their triumphant, albeit temporary, return demonstrates Sopa de Cabra's pre-eminent and lasting place in Catalan popular music.

=== 2015 Comeback ===
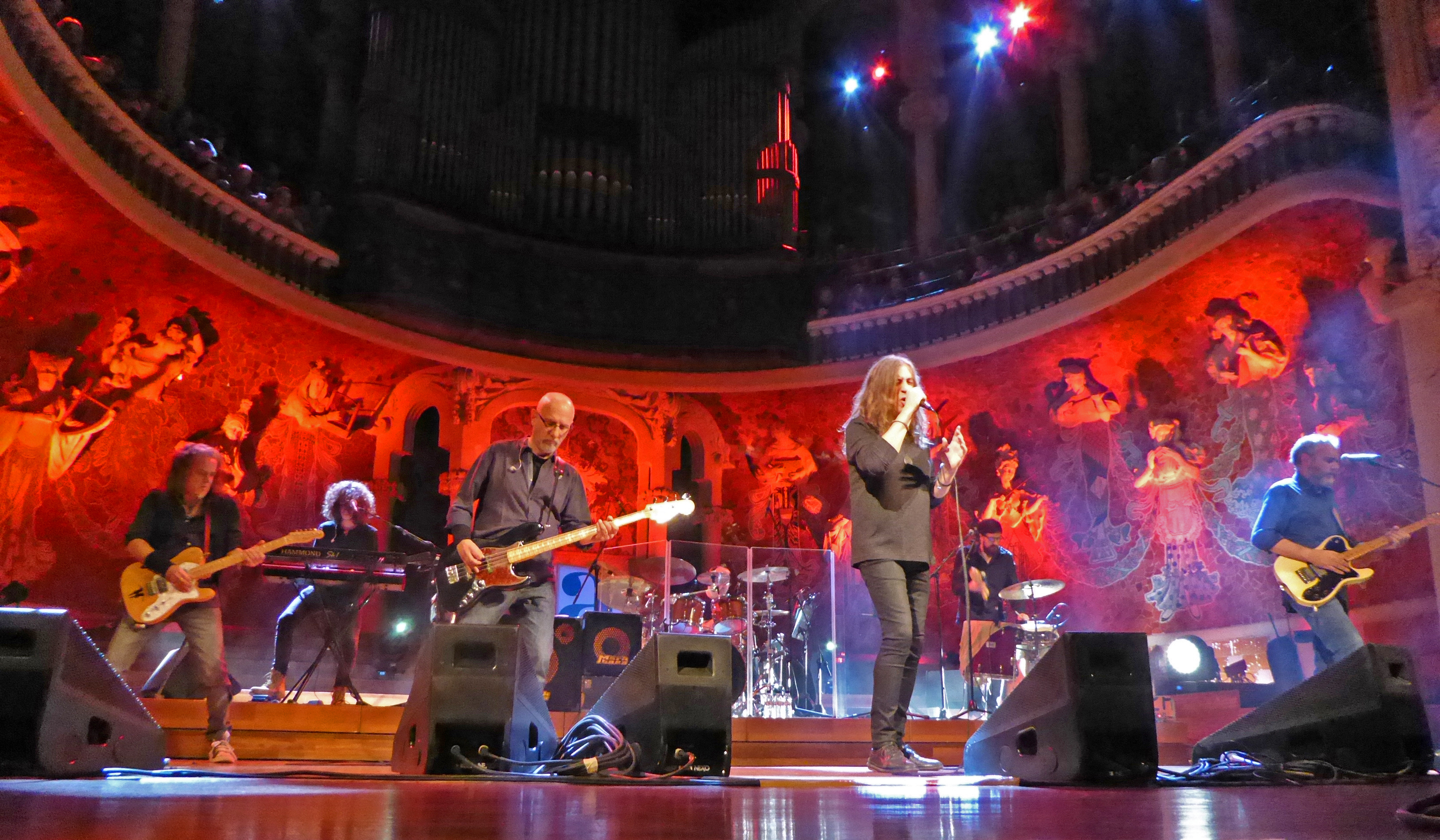
Sopa de Cabra on stage at the Palau de la Música Catalana, Barcelona, 27 November 2017. Left to right, Jaume Soler, Ricard Sohn, Francesc Lisicic, Pep Bosch (behind drums), Gerard Quintana, Valen Nieto, Josep Thió..

Following the success of the 'return' concerts in 2011, members of the band went back to own projects, but there were persistent rumours of a more permanent reincarnation. On 28 March 2015, the group played a surprise concert on the roof of Girona's tourist office, after dropping hints that something would occur during the preceding weeks. Singer Gerard Quintana announced that the group would be recording a new album. The album, entitled Cercles (Circles) came out in November 2015. This album was not another interpretation of the band's existing repertoire, but a selection of completely new songs by the well-established songwriting team, music by Josep Thió and lyrics by Gerard Quintana. An extensive promotional tour followed throughout 2016 (the thirtieth anniversary of the band's foundation) and 2017. There were two concerts outside Catalonia in 2016, in Madrid and London. At this stage, two new members of the line-up were established, Ricard Sohn on keyboards and Valen Nieto on percussion and guitar.

After a hiatus in 2018 to 2019, another studio album was released at the end of February 2020: La gran onada ('The great wave'). The tour planned for 2020 was naturally severely affected by the COVID-19 pandemic, although several concerts did take place.

== Discography ==
- Sopa de Cabra (1989)
- La Roda (1990)
- Ben endins (1991) (Live)
- Girona 83-87 "Somnis de Carrer" (1992)
- Mundo Infierno (1993)
- Al·lucinosi (1994)
- Sss... (1996)
- La nit dels anys (1997) (Live)
- Nou (1998)
- Dies de Carretera (2000)
- Plou i fa sol (2001)
- Bona nit, malparits! (2002) (Live)
- El llarg viatge (2003)
- Podré tornar enrere. El tribut a Sopa de Cabra (2006)
- Cercles (2015)
- La nit dels sopa (2018) (Live)
- La gran onada (2020)
