= Gavalda =

Gavalda, or Gavaldá, is a surname. Notable people with the surname include:

- Alberto Gavaldá (born 1992), Spanish sprinter
- Anna Gavalda (born 1970), French award-winning novelist
- Lluís Gavaldà (born 1963), Catalan-language singer
