= Lluís Gavaldà =

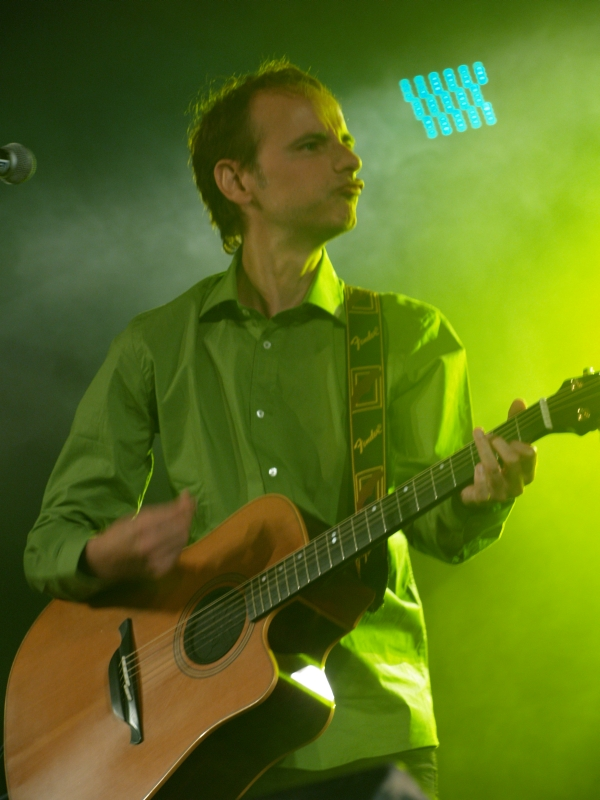
- Gavaldà playing guitar (2009)

Background information
- Born: Lluís Gavaldà; 15 April 1963 (age 62); Constantí, Spain
- Genres: Rock and roll Pop rock Rock agrícola
- Occupations: Musician, songwriter, media collaborator
- Instruments: Guitar, vocals
- Years active: 1985–present

Lluís Gavaldà i Roig (Constantí, Tarragonès, Spain, 15 April 1963) is the singer and main composer of the group "Els Pets". With a degree in Anglo-Germanic philology, Gavaldà is mainly known for being the singer, guitarist and composer of Els Pets, together with Falin Cáceres (bass) and Joan Reig (drums).

== Biography ==
After a period living in the United States, he returned to Catalonia, Spain, where he worked as an English teacher. It was at this time that the group Els Pets began a career that would make them one of the leading groups in Catalan rock. (Note: At their time Els Pets were one of the ‘four most popular rock bands singing in Catalan’.) Constantí's group has achieved countless awards, as for example Enderrock, the most represented and important of the Catalan music. Their recordings include such popular titles as Calla i Balla, Agost and Bon Dia, which continues to be the most successful record in the history of Catalan rock music with 100,000 copies.

In addition to his musical career, Gavaldà collaborates regularly with press, radio and television. He writes a weekly column for the newspaper Ara in the supplement Criatures. On the radio he participated in the program Eduqueu les Criatures (2006–2010, Catalunya Ràdio) with Carles Capdevila and presented the daily program El celobert an iCat. On television, he presented the contest Picalletres (2006, Televisió de Catalunya) and on 2019, he host a show dedicated to pop music: El celobert.

He has also published books such as "Estic prenyat", "El pare que et va matricular", "Valset" and "Lletres", the later being a commented collection of his songs.

== Bibliography ==
- Gavaldà, Lluís (2008). Estic prenyat (in Catalan). Edicions La Campana. ISBN 978-8496735170.
- Valset (2010) La Galera, with illustrations by Xavier Salomó, included a CD with an unpublished recording of the song Valset. ISBN 978-84-246-3573-2.
- Gavaldà, Lluís (2013). El pare que et va matricular (in Catalan). Editorial Columna. ISBN 9788466416207. Anecdotes about living with his son.
- Gavaldà, Lluís (2017). Lletres (in Catalan). Bridge. p. 152. ISBN 9788416670093.
