= Carles Sabater =

Catalan singer and actor

Carles Sabater i Hernández
- Born: 21 September 1962; Barcelona
- Died: 13 February 1999 (aged 36) Vilafranca del Penedès
- Genres: Pop rock; Rock català; Musical theatre
- Occupations: Singer; actor
- Instrument: Vocals
- Years active: 1984–1999 (acting); 1986–1999 (music)
- Formerly of: Sau
- Website: Official website

Carles Sabater i Hernández (21 September 1962 – 13 February 1999) was a Catalan singer and actor. Alongside an acting career in theatre, television and film, Sabater formed the group Sau with guitarist Pep Sala. Sau became the first rock band singing in Catalan to achieve major commercial success and were one of the key groups of the rock català movement.

== Biography ==
=== Acting career ===
Sabater originally planned to study biology at university, but decided to become an actor instead and was admitted to Barcelona's Institut del Teatre. In 1984 he made his debut as an actor in Una jornada particular with Josep Maria Flotats, with whom he subsequently worked on Cyrano de Bergerac. In 1988 he starred in Manuel Huerga's film Gaudí.

=== Musical career ===
Sabater met Pep Sala in 1986 while shooting a pilot for TV3.
