= Pep Sala =

Catalan musician (born 1960)

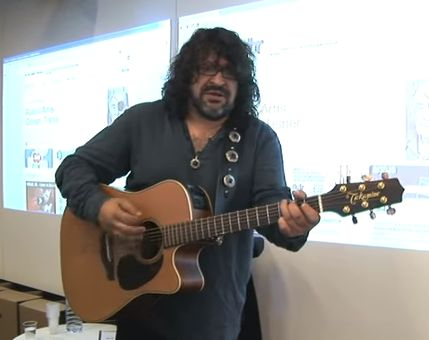
Pep Sala

Pep Sala (born 17 July 1960) is a Catalan musician, songwriter and record producer. With singer Carles Sabater, Sala formed the rock català group Sau, which achieved great popularity in the 1990s. He has performed and recorded with other musical groups including La Banda del Bar and since 1999 has pursued a solo career.

In the 2011, with the English singer Jack Lucien he wrote the song Be With You. .
