= Rock català =

Catalan music genre or scene

Rock català (Catalan pronunciation: [ˈrɔk kətəˈla], "Catalan Rock") is a type of music popular in the late 1980s and early 1990s involving Catalan lyrics and many different musical styles.

The last years of Spain under Franco were shattered by a generation of singers that claimed and called for democracy. In this context, La Nova Cançó is the protest song musical and political movement of artists singing in Catalan, like Lluís Llach, or Valencian artists like Raimon or Ovidi Montllor. In the late 1960s and during the 1970s, the Nova Cançó movement introduced lyrics in Catalan in contemporary music in order to reach wider audiences (until then, this language was only used in folk songs); then, by the 1980s and the return to democracy in Spain, their popularity was waning.

Then, in the late 1980s and early 1990s, the Generalitat de Catalunya, in the absence of a wide enough demand, offered grants for rock bands singing in Catalan. This made possible the formation of several bands singing in Catalan and, with them, the introduction of the then innovative concept of a rock music scene in Catalan.

The musical styles are diverse within the movement, being sole relation between these bands the use of the Catalan language in their lyrics.

Some representative bands of this movement include:

- Els Pets
- Sau
- Obrint Pas
- Sopa de Cabra
- Lax'n'Busto
- Sangtraït
