= Companyia Elèctrica Dharma =

Catalan band

Companyia Elèctrica Dharma is a Catalan band. Many of its members are brothers, from the district of Sants, in the city of Barcelona. They have performed in Europe, North and South America, and Africa at music festivals such as "Rock in Rio", Rio de Janeiro (Brasil) "Memphis In May" Memphis (USA) "Festival of Essakane" (Mali) "Awesome Africa Festival" and Durban (South Africa). Their albums are sold all over the world. The band's music is a fusion of Cobla, Rock, Jazz, Blues, Progressive music, and Symphonic rock.

== History ==
=== Early years ===
The three Fortuny brothers first played in the band "Els Llums". Their first concert was at Casal d'Horta in 1967. Josep was the drummer, Esteve played guitar and organ, and Joan was on bass. They sang The Beatles' songs, the obligatory rendition of The House of the Rising Sun and other traditional Catalan arrangements in rock versions. The rise in popularity of folk music prompted Els Llums to become La Roda and they began playing more acoustic sets. Josep played the twelve-string guitar, Esteve the double bass and Joan guitars and flute. They were joined by two new friends, Jordi Marigó, banjo; and Francesc Granell, guitar. They sang in Catalan and added some of their own work (El pescador, Tinc Fred, Mariner, Cors Humils, etc.), musical versions of popular songs and poems.

Changing their name once again to "Fang i Disbauxa", they abandoned folk music and went back to their electric roots, partly because they crashed their father's car, a tiny Seat 600, while the double bass was on the roof rack. They got into Blues, and wanted to play solos like John Lee Hooker and Big Bill Broonzy so they decided to turn their hands to instrumental pieces.

=== Dharma ===
1971, Josep, Esteve and Joan met a saxophonist called Leandro, who was a big fan of On the Road by Kerouac, the iconic book of the Beat Generation, which in Catalan was translated by Manuel de Pedrolo as "Els pòtols místics" or "Els pirats de la Dharma".

During these early years some new faces came and went: for example, Joan Bofill (flute) and Joan Albert, who inspired Joan Fortuny to play the saxo. They shared the scene with Màquina!, the band which was regarded as the best underground rock or progressive music band of its time, alongside groups such as Agua de Regaliz, Baf or Bueyes Madereros.

The first festival in which they took part was at Les Palmeres, in the district of Sants, on 30 June 1972. Also on the bill were other musicians who have become big stars such as Maria del Mar Bonet, Om, Baf, Fennech, Bueyes Madereros, Slo Blo, Jaume Sisa and Pau Riba.

At that time, Josep, Esteve and Joan really got into hippy culture, oriental philosophies, countercultural values and the underground.

Following the example of the K1 and K2 hippy communities from Berlin, Josep wrote a manifesto to organize an urban community as a first step towards a rural community. In this project they met Carles Vidal. 1973 was an important year for Dharma. The urban community was set up, Carles joined the band as bass player and Joan took up the saxo, which gave the band their special unmistakable identity.

=== Laietan Rock ===
May 10, 1973 Pepe Aponte and Victor Jou opened the celebrated Sala Zeleste in the old part of Barcelona, which became home to the musical movement Rock Laietà (Laietan Rock) one of the most fertile music initiatives that the country has ever had.

Companyia Elèctrica Dharma and Orquesta Mirasol were the main exponents of this musical style together with such musicians as Santi Arisa, Arrels, Jordi Sabatés, Sisa and Max Sunyer, to mention only a few.

The band had their first taste of stardom on November 10, 1973, when a short film they had written and acted in, La Dansa de Moloc, won the 12th National Film Contest organised by the Manresa Film Club.

Soon afterwards, they met Jordi Soley in Malla (Osona). He initially wanted to join the urban community, but by that time it was full. However, he got into the band as a piano player.

With Soley, Dharma rose to the challenge of composing the soundtrack for a tribute to Picasso in a multivision performance at the Picasso Museu on the occasion of the first anniversary of the artist's death, and playing as session musicians for the record Vetlles Al Voltant Del Foc by Jaume Arnella.

== Consolidation ==
Summer 1974, Josep, Esteve, Joan, Carles and Jordi, together with Frances Contra went to live in Casa Nova de Can Comas, a farm in the north of the country. They made handicrafts for a living and set up a rehearsal room, where they worked on their first album Diumenge, and received such well-known musicians as Jaume Sisa, Manel Joseph, Josep Maria París, the piano player Victor Ammann and the flute player Xavier Barenys. In January 1975, Josep's girlfriend left the Dharma Community to join the theatre group Els Comediants. The album, released in April, had a jazz, rock and free-jazz influences, the result of listening to musicians such as Miles Davis, Weather Report, John McLaughlin and Wayne Shorter. But less than a month later they decided that this was not what they were looking for. They wanted a more personal sound more rooted in the autochthonous musical tradition.

=== Success ===
The results of their search for their own sound were soon to come. The album L'Oucomballa was the first time they combined their own peculiar sound with more traditional music, and they matured and consolidated this experiment in Tramuntana. This album, presented at the Canet Rock Festival in 1976 and released the year after, led to the consecration of the band. They sold 30,000 copies almost immediately and were given excellent reviews. They went on tour and were a great success all over Spain, particularly in the final concert at the Real Madrid Sports Pavillian in the capital in December 1977.

In May 1978 they released their fourth album, L'àngel de la dansa, which they performed at Palau dels Esports in Barcelona in front of more than 9,000 people., The Dharma put on an extraordinary performance, but it was Jordi Soley's last gig before he left the band. They toured around Catalonia (Spain) and Italy. Meanwhile, L'Oucomballa and Tramuntana became the best-selling Catalan rock albums. They became big in Italy where they often appeared on magazine covers and TV programs. With L'àngel de la dansa, they closed what is regarded as the group's symphonic period.

== Towards a more "Pop"-type sound ==
Under Construction

== Collaboration with Cobla Mediterrània ==
Under construction

== The Tribal Age ==
=== Death of Esteve Fortuny ===
To be done, soon

== International projection ==
=== Paris ===
In September 1990, the band traveled to Paris to play at the Showcase of MARS, and they were made several offers by promoters from USA, Asia and Europe.

=== USA, April 1991 ===
Elèctrica Dharma crossed the Atlantic Ocean for the first time. They did a series of concerts in universities all over the country: Syracuse, Rochester, Ithaca, Watertown and Elmira.

The North American public reacted very positively. In the magazine Billboard, Carlos Agudelo wrote "The music o Companyia Elèctrica Dharma is mature, rich and powerful; it calls your attention and plays with your senses in a new, delicate and fascinating way. They ended this first tour at SOB's in Manhattan (NYC).

After they had returned from the states, on 11 January 1992 they presented Tifa Head at Zeleste in Barcelona. In March 1993 they released Que no es perdi aquest so, an album in which they used melodies from the Llibre Vermell de Montserrat. By going back to their roots, they re-encountered their original sound, closer to what had first made them popular. With this album they went back to the United States for a second tour in 1993.

In 1992, they were awarded the National Prize of Music by the Government of Catalonia.

=== USA 1993 ===
In 1993 they went back to the US for a tour of the Summer Festivals, playing a final gig at the Knitting Factory in Manhattan.

=== 20th Anniversary ===
1994 was their busiest year yet. They signed for the record label Picap and re-released Catalluna. The Fortuny brothers and Carles Vidal went back to the rehearsal studio, a house in Carrer de Sagunt street in the district of Sants, to prepare for the 20th anniversary of the foundation of the group. The activities were coordinated by Rosa Solsona, Esteve's girlfriend, who managed them until 1995. The most important event was a concert at the Palau Sant Jordi on 23 April, where they performed with 17 different bands and guest singers in front of an audience of up to 20,000 people.

=== Europe 2000 Decade ===
At the beginning of the first decade of the 20th century, Dharma went on tour several times in Europe. They played in countries such as Hungary, Croatia, Slovenia, Poland, Netherlands, Portugal and Sweden. They particularly remember the gigs in Croatia where they used to perform two or three times every year in Zagreb or Split, and in summer on the beach. The first time it didn't feel as if there had been a war. But the next time they went back in winter. They crossed the country and saw the devastation, abandoned towns and misery. When they got to Split, they once again performed on the beach but this time with snow and ice. It was their coldest concert ever, but they played to a full house.

Some of the most important concerts from these European tours were:

- Colliure Festival (France)
- Mediator (France)
- Mars Fair (France)
- Nuit Mediterranean (France)
- Matav Kalaka Folk Festival (Hungary)
- Ethno Ambient Festival (Croatia)
- Mediteran Festival (Slovenia)
- Teatr Polski Festival (Poland)
- International Folk Festival (Holland)
- De Oude Ulo Festival (Holland)
- Rock in Rio III (Brazil)
- Split Carnival Festival (Croatia)
- W. Ethno Amb. Fest. at Tvornica (Croatia)
- Festa do Avante in Lisbon (Portugal)
- Wrzesnia Jeleniogórskiego 2001 (Poland)
- Rhodes Summer Festival (Greece)
- Malmö festivalen (Sweden)
- Goteborgskalaset festival (Sweden)
- Ethno Ambient Festival’03 (Croatia)
- 13ème Fifres de Garonne (France)
- Kalaka Folk Festival (Hungary)

=== Brazil, January 2001 ===
They performed at the biggest festival in the world, with a total audience of around one million people.

They had been invited by Carlos de Andrade, owner of Visom Digital, a Brazilian-based record company, and a promoter who had discovered them at a WOMEX in Germany and decided to publish two compilations of their work in Brazil.

=== Memphis (2007–2008) ===
They played in Memphis (Tennessee- US) by the Mississippi River. There they put on two concerts in 2007 and 2008, as part of the Memphis In May International Festival.

=== Mali 2008 ===
Dharma were invited to play in Africa for a second time at the Festival Au Desert in Mali. They started a collaboration with the Tamasheq group Imarhane.

The festival featured the world music style, and was held in the middle of the Sahara desert. The camp for the festival covered a large area and consisted primarily of tents (locally referred to as haimas) divided into different camp areas according to nationality, with the stage located in the middle.

== Sound experiences ==
In 1996 they released the album El ventre de la bèstia, which expresses their frustration with how the system absorbs all the struggles for change.

Two years later, in 1998, they released Racó de món, all the songs on which were traditional, played and arranged by the present members, except for La filla del marxant, parts of which were arranged by Esteve Fortuny.

In the year 2000 the eighteenth Dharma record, Sonada, was released with influences from Romani music and new versions of previous songs. Three years later, they released Llibre Vermell in which they mixed rock and medieval music. The songs were traditional Catalan ones, but played in the contemporary style. The traditional sound of tenora was backed by African rhythms. So it was a mix of the old and the new.

In this period they went on two international tours, the first to Rock in Rio III, in Brazil, and the second to South Africa, where for the first time they managed to combine the tenora and the imbombo (Catalan and African instruments together). They also toured Europe, Hungary, Croatia, Slovenia, Poland, Netherlands, Portugal or Sweden.

== Albums ==
- Diumenge (1975)
- L'oucomballa (1976)
- Tramuntana (1977)
- L'àngel de la dansa (1978)
- Ordinàries aventures (1979)
- L'Atlàntida (1981)
- Al Palau de la Música amb la Cobla Mediterrània (1982)
- Catalluna (1983)
- Força Dharma! Deu anys de resistència (1985)
- No volem ser (1986)
- Homenatge a Esteve Fortuny (1987)
- Fibres del cor (1989)
- Tifa Head (1991)
- Que no es perdi aquest so (1993)
- 20 anys de Companyia Elèctrica Dharma (1994)
- El ventre de la bèstia (1996)
- Racó de món (1998)
- Sonada (2000)
- Llibre vermell (2002)
- Dharmasseria (2004)
- 30 anys, la Dharma l'arma! (2006)
- El misteri d'en Miles Serra i les musiques mutants (2008)
- Monpou's mood Mariagneta and Patum Jack Blues (2010)
- Nit Col.lectiva! (2012)
- Flamarada (2019)

== Other References ==
Antoni Batista, journalist in La Vanguardia (Spanish international newspaper)

José Luís Rubio, musical journalist at Cambio16 (Spanish newspaper)
