= Eufòria =

Catalan music talent show

- Directed by: Tono Hernández
- Presented by: Marta Torné; Miki Núñez
- Judges: Elena Gadel; Lildami; Marc Clotet; Carol Rovira; Albert Sala; Alfred Garcia; Mama Dousha; Queralt Lahoz
- Country of origin: Spain
- Original language: Catalan
- No. of seasons: 3
- No. of episodes: 16

Production
- Executive producers: Cristian Trepa & Mario Daza (TV3); Ignasi Comillas & Tono Hernández (Veranda TV)
- Producers: Roser Sancho (TV3); Sílvia Fortuny (Veranda TV)
- Production company: Veranda TV

Original release
- Network: TV3
- Release: March 3, 2022 – present

Eufòria (Catalan for "Euphoria") is a Catalan music talent show. It premiered on March 3, 2022, on the television channel TV3. In each season 16 finalists were selected to participate, after a series of auditions. The final prize of each season of the show is a record contract, singing with Miki Núñez in the Summer Song from TV3, and participate in the album of La Marató de TV3.

== Production ==
Eufòria is produced by TV3 and the production company Veranda TV, with the collaboration of the Department of Culture of the Generalitat de Catalunya. The show's four seasons have been presented by actress and presenter Marta Torné and singer Miki Núñez.

Each season has three judges who comment on the performances and choose who will be eliminated and who will stay in the show: in season 1 these were actors Elena Gadel and Marc Clotet and rap singer Lildami, in season 2 Gadel and Lildami returned, joined by Carol Rovira, interpretation coach of season 1. Season 3 saw choreographer Albert Sala, and singer Alfred Garcia join Rovira as new judges.

For season 4 Garcia was joined by new judges, singers Mama Dousha and Queralt Lahoz.

== Auditions ==
The audition process for the first season, consisted of two parts: the first one started with 1,500 candidates with 90 selected for part 2 (20 more than it was initially planned). The second part of the auditions happened in the span of three days and during these, the candidates were tested by their future coaches. At the end of the first day, 40 participants remained, after the second day the number reduced to 25 and on the third day, the 15 finalists of the show were chosen (this was changed and on the first episode a sixteenth contestant was introduced to the public).

For the second season 2,300 candidates auditioned, but only 72 reached the final stage, which was streamed on Twitch by Nadine Romero. This last phase of auditions was split in two parts and both were broadcast on TV3. During these two episodes the 16 finalists for season 2 were selected.

Season 3 saw over 1,000 people audition for the show, with a first online selection and the in person casting held in Placa de Catalunya in Barcelona, with 26 contestants reaching the final stage of the auditions.

In season 4, 400 people were selected after online auditions and performed in Placa de Catalunya again in front of Clara Luna, Jordi Cubino and Daniel Angles. 71 contestants were selected to take part in the second phase of auditions, held in the studios of TV3, with 15 chosen to participate in the programme. For the first time two additional contestants were also selected for the gala 1, where the public would vote for their favourite to remain in the programme as contestant n.16.

== Dynamic ==
=== Season 1 ===
TV3 aired episodes, called "gala", on Fridays. The contestants were each given a solo song, as well as the background voices for two or more other participants songs. During each episode the three judges decided whether to save or send to the "danger zone (zona de perill)" each of the contestants after their performances, and at the end of the night all those nominated would be up for elimination. As well as by the judges, the contestants' harmonies were also analysed by what is called the "musical VAR", led by producer Jordi Cubino, to identify mistakes and one or more singers were nominated for elimination depending on the findings of the VAR. The coaches, on the other end, were able to "save" a participant who had been nominated for elimination by Cubino or by the judges. The remaining two contestants at risk of elimination were then presented to the public, who will save one via online vote, with the unsuccessful leaving the show. After the gala 6 the public was either asked to save or eliminate a contestant, depending on the episode.

On the gala 2 the "favourite" was introduced, chosen by the judges together by pressing a button (similar to the concept of the "Golden Buzzer in the Got Talent show). The favourite however could change through the night, as the judges could press the button many times and for each performer. At the end of the night, the final favourite, as well as being "safe" and automatically move to the next episode, would also be able to choose the two contestants who will be their backing singers.

During the week, the contestants would prepare and rehearse their performances with the help of various coaches: Jordi Cubino (musical director), Daniel Anglès (singing/voice), Albert Sala and Aina Casanovas (choreography) and Carol Rovira (interpretation).

During the gala 6, Marta announced that the following show would be a rematch gala, in which one of the eliminated contestants would be able to come back to the show and the public would decide by voting.

On the gala 11 (first semifinal), the contestants sang a solo song as well as a duet with a fellow contestant and their backing vocals were supported by all the eliminated participants. The most voted singer (favourite) moved directly to the final, with the last 5 singers moving to the gala 12 (second semifinal) where they sang two songs each and the two most voted by the public moved to the final, as well.

=== Season 2 ===
The dynamic of the second season was similar to the first one, but the judges voted individually for each performance and, if a contestant had two or more positive votes, they were safe. For the second season, coaches Jordi Cubino (musical director), Daniel Anglès (voice) and Albert Sala and Aina Casanovas (choreography) continued to help prepare the contestants with new coach, Paula Malia, taking over as interpretation coach, replacing Carol Rovira, who became a judge. Pianist Clara Luna also coached the singers.

During the gala 3 it was announced that there would be double elimination, the first elimination would take place at the beginning and the other at the end of the episode as always. The first elimination would be put at risk the two contestants who finished in the danger zone during the second gala.

On the gala 5 the roles were reversed. The public, through voting, decided which contestants were to remain on the show and which ones went to the danger zone. The five with the most votes, would be automatically saved, the most voted would be the favourite of the night, and the remaining four contestants would go to the danger zone. On their side, the VAR was tasked with saving a contestant and the judges were the ones to choose the eliminated of the night.

During the gala 6, Marta announced that the following show would be a rematch gala, like in the previous season, and that two eliminated contestants would come back to the show.

=== Season 3 ===
The first gala of the new season saw all the contestants perform in groups of four, as soloist as well as doing the background vocals for the other three. After listening to the four performances, the judges will determine who was safe and who will be sent to the "danger zone" (in this new season there was an unlimited number of contestants who could be at risk of elimination. The public will then vote for their favourites, with the last two contestant having to leave the show.

The judges for this season were Alfred Garcia, choreographer Albert Sala and Carol Rovira, returning from the previous season. The show was presented again by Marta Torné and Miki Núñez.

As in previous seasons most galas would see contestants perform their solo songs, as well as background vocals for fellow contestants. The judges would decide for each of them whether they were "the favourite", safe or in the "danger zone". Before the final votes from the public the VAR would choose if any additional contestant were to be in danger of elimination, while the coaches would be able to save their favourites. The final two contestants in danger would be voted by the public, with one staying and one leaving the show.

Galas 4 and 8 were reversed, with the public voting their favourite contestants. The six most voted would be safe (with the top one being the favourite), while the remaining ones would be at risk of elimination. The VAR would be able to save two of the bottom contestants for excelling in supporting others with background vocals.

=== Season 4 ===
As during season 3, during the first gala the contestants performed in groups of four, with the judges choosing who was safe and who will be at risk of elimination. After all performances, the VAR (Cubino and Clara Luna) also sent the worst background vocalist in the "danger zone". The public was tasked with choosing their favourite, with the last two contestants leaving the show. The two additional contestants from the audition phase (Carla and Gerard) were also voted by the public, with the highest scorer, Gerard, joining the line-up for the show. During this gala it was revealed that if a contestant was episode Favourite 3 times, they will win a prize (to be revealed).

Gala 4 was reversed/backwards, with the public voting their favourite contestants as the previous year. The six most voted would be safe (with the top one being the favourite), while the remaining ones would be at risk of elimination. The VAR was able to save two of the bottom contestants for excelling in supporting others with background vocals and so were the coaches. The judges had then to decide which of the last two remaining contestants would continue and which would be eliminated from the show.

== Weekly statistics ==
=== Season 1 ===
	Gala 1	Gala 2	Gala 3	Gala 4	Gala 5	Gala 6	Gala 7	Gala 8	Gala 9	Gala 10	Gala 11		Gala 12			Final
Mariona	Saved	Saved	Saved	Favourite	Saved	Favourite	Exempt	Saved	Favourite*	Semifinalist		Saved	47%	Finalist		61%
Triquell	Nominated	Saved	Saved	Saved	Nominatedº	Nominated	Exempt	Favourite	Saved	Favourite	Semifinalist	Favourite*	Finalist			39%
Núria	Saved	Saved	Saved	Nominated	Favourite	66%	Exempt	Saved	Saved	Saved	Semifinalist	63%	24%	46%	Finalist	25%
Pedro	Saved	Saved	Saved	Saved	Saved	Saved	Exempt	Saved	Nominatedº	73%	Semifinalist	Saved	15%	29%		
Edu	Nominated	Saved	Favourite	Saved	Saved	34%	44%	Saved	75%	Saved	Semifinalist	Saved	14%	25%		
Scorpio	Nominated	Nominatedº	Saved	Nominated	Saved	Saved	Exempt	Saved	Saved	Saved	Semifinalist	37%				
Clàudia	Saved	48%					25%	52%	Saved	27%						
Joan	Saved	Saved	Saved	Saved	67%	Saved	Exempt	Nominated	25%							
Estela	Saved	Favourite	63%	56%º	Saved	Saved	Exempt	48%								
Chung-Man	20%º	Nominated	Saved	Saved	33%		20%									
Llum	25%	52%	Saved	44%			6%									
Laura	Saved	Saved	37%				4%									
Nerea	16%						11%									
Alvert	14%						1%									
Pep	13%						2%									
Looa	12%						2%									

=== Season 2 ===
	Gala 1	Gala 2	Gala 3		Gala 4	Gala 5	Gala 6	Gala 7	Gala 8	Gala 9	Gala 10	Gala 11		Gala 12			Final	
Jim	16%	Saved	Exempt	Favourite	Saved	Saved	69%	Exempt	Favourite	12 votes/ Saved	Saved	Semifinalist	Nominated	40%	40%	Finalist	44%	59%
Carla	Saved	Saved	Exempt	Saved	Saved	Saved	Saved	Exempt	Saved	2 votes/ 68%	Saved	Semifinalist	Saved (21%)	24%	33%	Finalist	33%	41%
Alèxia	Nominated	Saved	Exempt	54%	Nominatedº	Favourite	Favourite	Exempt	Saved	Saved (20%)	Saved	Semifinalist	Favourite* (22%)	Finalist			23%	
Sofia	Saved	Favourite	Exempt	Saved	Saved	Nominated	Saved	Exempt	Saved	Favourite (20%)	Semifinalist		Nominated	21%	27%			
Tomàs	Saved	Saved	Exempt	Nominated	Saved	Saved	Saved	Exempt	Saved	Saved (14%)	Favourite	Semifinalist	54%	15%				
Elena	Saved	Saved	Exempt	Saved	Favourite	Nominated	Saved	Exempt	Saved	17 votes/ Saved	67%	Semifinalist	46%					
Paula	8%							17 votes/ Returning	Nominated	13 votes/ Saved	31%							
Carlos	Nominated	Saved	Exempt	Nominated	Saved	1/3		7 votes/ 27%	58%	32%								
Clàudia	Saved	Saved	Exempt	Saved	86%º	Saved	Saved	Exempt	31%									
Jan	Saved	55%º	67%	Saved	Nominated	2/3	31%	16%										
Domènec	23%	Saved	Exempt	Saved	14%			2%										
Emmi	32%	Nominated	Exempt	46%º				23%										
Natàlia	Saved	31%	33%					7%										
Nei	Nominated	14%						20%										
Héctor	14%º							4%										
Ethan	8%							1%										

=== Season 3 ===
	Gala 1	Gala 2	Gala 3	Gala 4: al revés (backwards)	Gala 5		Gala 6	Gala 7	Gala 8: al revés (backwards)	Gala 9: de relleu		Gala 10: of the audience	Gala 11: First Semifinal		Gala 12: Second Semifinal			Gala 13: Final	
Lluís	Saved	Saved	Nominated	15%	Exempt	Saved	Saved	Nominated	13%	Favourite	Exempt	17%	Semifinalist	Nominated	35%	36%	Finalist	40%	58%
Maria	Saved	Saved	Saved	Nominated	Exempt	Saved	65%	Saved	15%	Saved	Exempt	14 votes/ Saved	Semifinalist	17%	27%	35%	Finalist	31%	42%
Julien	24%	Saved	Saved	10%	Exempt	Saved	Favourite	Saved	22%	Saved	Exempt	25%	Semifinalist	25%*	Finalist			29%	
Misty	Saved	Saved	Saved	8%	Exempt	Saved	Saved	Saved	14%	Nominated	Exempt	13 votes/ Saved	Semifinalist	Nominated	24%	29%			
Valeria	Saved	Nominated	Favourite	9%	Exempt	Favourite	Saved	Saved	2/3	Nominated°	Exempt	8 votes / Saved	Semifinalist	61%	14%				
Fredrik	Saved	Saved	Saved	18%	Exempt	Nominated	35%			Nominated	43%	6 votes / 54%	Semifinalist	39%					
Xavi	Saved	Nominated	Saved	Nominated	Exempt	Saved	Saved	Favourite	Nominated	66%	Exempt	7 votes / 46%							
Aina	Saved	Favourite	Saved	Nominated	Exempt	Saved	Saved	Saved	Nominated	34%									
Lluna	34%	Saved	Nominated°	Nominated	58%	66%º	Saved	55%º	1/3	Nominated	14%								
Bita	Saved	Saved	Saved	Nominated	Exempt	Saved	Nominated	45%		Nominated	19%								
Pau	34%	58%º	56%	12%	Exempt	34%				Nominated	6%								
Rangel	Saved	Nominated	Saved	Nominated	42%					Nominated	4%								
Yuk	25%	Saved	44%							Nominated	4%								
Dounia	Nominated	42%								Nominated	4%								
Tamara	23%									Nominated	2%								
Hugo	18%									Nominated	4%								

=== Season 4 ===
	Gala 1	Gala 2	Gala 3	Gala 4: al revés (backwards)	Gala 5	Gala 6	Gala 7: de relleu (rematch)		Gala 8: of the audience	Gala 9	Gala 10	Gala 11: First Semifinal			Gala 12: Second Semifinal			Gala 13: Final	
Aina Machuca	Saved	Saved	Saved	Nominated	Saved	Saved	Saved	Exempt	21%	Nominated	Nominatedº/ 2 votes	Semifinalist		32%*	Finalist			38%	63%
Monique	Saved	Favourite	Nominatedº	Nominated	Nominatedº	Saved	Favorite	Exempt	20%	Nominatedº	Saved	Semifinalist		29%	35%	28%	Finalist	32%	37%
Tura	Nominated	Saved	Saved	9%	Saved	Saved	69%	Exempt	6 votes/ saved	Saved	Saved	Semifinalist		73%	28%	52%	Finalist	30%	
Clara	Nominated	Saved	Favourite	Nominated	Saved	Saved	Nominatedº	Exempt	15 votes/ saved	Favourite	Nominated/ 1 vote	Semifinalist		Nominated	20%	20%			
Oliver	Saved	Saved	Saved	Nominated	Favourite	Nominated	Saved	Exempt	18 votes/ saved	Saved	Favourite	Semifinalist		Nominated	17%				
Daniela	Saved	Saved	Saved	23%	Saved	Saved	Nominated	Exempt	4 votes/ 77%	Saved	Nominatedº/ 0 votes	52%	Semifinalist	27%					
Aida	Saved	Nominated	Saved	9%	34%		Nominated	35%	14%	52%	Nominated/ 0 votes	48%							
Lluis	Saved	Saved	Saved	12%	66%	65%	Saved	Exempt	14%	48%									
Arian	Saved	Saved	Saved	2/3	Nominated	Favourite	Saved	Exempt	5 votes/ 23%										
Gerard	69%	60%	57%	9%	Saved	Saved	31%												
Noa	26%	Saved	Saved	9%	Nominated	35%	Nominated	26%											
Ian	Saved	Saved	Nominated	1/2			Nominated	8%											
Blasco	Saved	Nominated	43%				Nominated	12%											
Irene	32%	40%					Nominated	7%											
Emma	22%						Nominated	9%											
Pau	21%						Nominated	3%											
Carla	31%																		

Normal gala:
º: saved but nominated by the "musical VAR".
*: Favourite who will become semifinalist or finalist directly
the contestant is nominated for the «zona de perill», but saved by the coaches.
the contestant was nominated but saved.
the contestant is nominated all week and on the next episode it will be decided if they leave or not.
the contestant was nominated and eliminated.
the contestant has been on the favourite chair at some point of the night.
the contestant is the favourite of the night.
the contestant cannot be eliminated.
the contestant is saved by the coaches, VAR and judges, after being nominated by the public.
the contestant is a Semifinalist.
the contestant goes through a second scoring round to move to the final (in the semifinal) or to win the program (in the final)
the contestant is a Finalist.
Winner
Second finalist
Third finalist
Gala de relleu (rematch):
the contestant is a candidate to come back to the program.
the contestant comes back to the program.

== Performances ==
=== Season 1 ===
==== Solo performances ====
	Gala 1	Gala 2	Gala 3	Gala 4	Gala 5	Gala 6	Gala 7	Gala 8	Gala 9	Gala 10	Gala 11	Gala 12 (Note: For this gala, the contestants sang two different songs.)	Final gala
Mariona	«T'estimo» by Belén Aguilera	«Drivers License» by Olivia Rodrigo	«Bam Bam» by Camila Cabello ft. Ed Sheeran	«I Drove All Night» by Celine Dion	«Cheap Thrills» by Sia	«Me cuesta tanto olvidarte» by Mecano		«Seré Feliç (I Will Survive)» by Gloria Gaynor	«Crazy in Love» by Beyoncé	«La plaça del diamant» by Ramon Muntaner	«On aniré» from Moana	«Believe» by Cher; «Amor particular» by Lluís Llach	«La mare» by Dyango; «Physical» by Dua Lipa
Triquell	«Bad Guy» by Billie Eilish	«Jean-Luc» by Els Amics de les Arts	«Feeling Good» by Michael Bublé	«Si tothom calla» by Gertudris	«Massa bé» by Doctor Prats	«Never Gonna Give You Up» by Rick Astley		«Enemy» by Imagine Dragons	«Al vent» by Raimon	«Tobogan» by Zoo	«Grace Kelly» by Mika	«With or Without You» by U2	«Pump It» by Black Eyed Peas; «Ull per ull» by Adrià Puntí
Núria	«Io Canto» by Laura Pausini	«Ain't Your Mama» by Jennifer López	«The Climb» by Miley Cyrus (in Catalan	«El vol de l'home ocell» by Sangtraït	«So What» by Pink	«Què volen aquesta gent?» by Maria del Mar Bonet		«My Head & My Heart» by Ava Max	«Tu pots canviar-ho tot (has de viure)» by Irene Cara	«Suerte» by Shakira	«Only Girl (In the World)» by Rihanna	«Sobreviviré» by Mónica Naranjo; «Titanium» by David Guetta feat. Sia	«Who You Are» by Jessie J; «Història repetida» by Núria Feliu
Pedro	«Stay With Me» by Sam Smith (in Catalan)	«You Are the Reason» by Calum Scott	«No vull baixar» by Stay Homas	«Save Your Tears» by the Weeknd	«País Petit» by Lluís Llach	«Dynamite» by BTS		«Falling» by Harry Styles	«Hentai» by Rosalía	«Break Free» by Ariana Grande	«Tornarem» by Lax'n'Busto	«Someone You Loved» by Lewis Capaldi; «Tudo Bem» by Stay Homas	
Edu	«Locked Out of Heaven» by Bruno Mars	«Wake Me Up» by Avicii	«Beggin'» by Måneskin	«Vespre» by Els Pets	«Volcans» by Buhos	«Diamants» by Els Catarres	«Everybody» by Backstreet Boys	«El far del sud» by Sopa de Cabra	«Bad Habits» by Ed Sheeran	«El seu gran hit» by Els Amics de les Arts	«Sex Bomb» by Tom Jones	«El tren de Mitjanit» by Sau; «Can't Stop the Feeling!» by Justin Timberlake	
Scorpio	«Milionària» by Rosalía	«Easy on Me» by Adele	«In the night» by Oques Grasses	«The Edge of Glory» by Lady Gaga	«Ya no quiero ná by Lola Índigo»	«Back to Black» by Amy Winehouse		«Ay mamá» by Rigoberta Bandini	«Bang Bang» by Jessie J, Ariana Grande & Nicki Minaj	«ABCDEFU» by Gayle (singer)	«Fuego» by Eleni Foureira		
Clàudia	«La Vida és Bella» by Noa	«God Is a Woman» by Ariana Grande					«Beautiful» by Christina Aguilera	«Ironic» by Alanis Morissette	«Hold My Hand» by Lady Gaga	«Stronger (What Doesn't Kill You)» by Kelly Clarkson			
Joan	«L'Aguila Negra» by Maria del Mar Bonet	«Don't Be Shy» by Tiësto & Karol G	«Vaig Aprendre» from El Petit Príncep	«It's a Sin» by Elton John	«Ho Tenim Tot» by Joan Dausà	«I Kissed a Girl» by Katy Perry		«Disco Inferno» by The Trammps	«Sé que llutiaràs» by Kate Ryan				
Estela	«This Is Me» from The Greatest Showman (in catalan)	«It's Raining Men» by The Weather Girls	«All About That Bass» by Meghan Trainor	«Avui vull agrair» by Mónica Naranjo	«Highway to Hell» by AC/DC	«The Winner Takes It All» by ABBA		«Ara que tinc vint anys» by Joan Manuel Serrat					
Chung-Man	«Stay» by The Kid Laroi & Justin Bieber	«El cant de l'enyor» by Lluís Llach	«Escriurem» by Miki Núñez	«There's Nothing Holdin' Me Back» by Shawn Mendes	«All of Me» by John Legend		«La dels Manel» by Lildami						
Llum	«Like a Virgin» by Madonna	«Quina cua que tinc» from Super3	«Soy rebelde» by Jeanette	«Aviam què passa» by Rigoberta Bandini			«La la la» by Joan Manuel Serrat						
Laura	«Don't Start Now» by Dua Lipa	«Sense Tu» by Teràpia de Shock	«Foc» by Roser				«Baby One More Time» by Britney Spears						
Nerea	«Petar-ho» by Oques Grasses						«The Best» by Tina Turner						
Alvert	«Call Me by Your Name» by Lil Nas X						«La festa infinita» by Siderland						
Pep	«Compta amb mi» by Txarango						«Tacones Rojos» by Sebastián Yatra						
Looa	«Don't Go Yet» by Camila Cabello						«Mafiosa» by Nathy Peluso						
Guest		«Mar el poder del Mar» by Delafé y Las Flores Azules	«Eufòria» by Portobello	«Com dues gotes d'aigua» by Manu Guix	«Pur» by Suu	«Un lloc que recordi» by Mishima	«De Lao» by Sexenni	«Carpe Diem» by Ramon Mirabet	«A poc a poc» by Doctor Prats	«Queda't així» by Joan Dausà	«Vull saber de tu» by Ginestà	«Mr. Landlord» by The Excitements	«Fascinados» & «Me llamo Abba» by Sidoine

==== Performances in pairs ====
For the gala 11, and first semifinal, it was announced that, apart from their solo performances, the contestants would have to sing in pairs.

Performances
Gala	Contestants	Song
Gala 11	Edu & Mariona	«La gent que estimo» by Oques Grasses & Rita Payés
Gala 11	Núria & Scorpio	«Tell Him» by Barbra Streisand & Celine Dion
Gala 11	Pedro & Triquell	«Under Pressure» by Queen & David Bowie

=== Season 2 ===
==== Solo performances ====
	Gala 1	Gala 2	Gala 3	Gala 4	Gala 5	Gala 6	Gala 7	Gala 8	Gala 9	Gala 10	Gala 11	Gala 12	Gala 13
Jim	«Sweet Child o' Mine» by Guns N' Roses	«Sóc la d'ahir» by Samantha	«Toy» by Netta	«The Look» by Roxette	«No controles» by Olé Olé	«Estimar-te com la terra» by Ginestà		«It's Oh So Quiet» by Betty Hutton (Note: She sang Björk's version.)	«Xuculatina» by Figa Flawas	«It's My Life» by Bon Jovi	«Boig per tu» by Sau	«Tattoo» by Loreen; «Jugular» by Triquell	«Somnis entre boires» by Sangtraït; «I'm Outta Love» byAnastacia
Alèxia	«Can't Get You Out of My Head» by Kylie Minogue	«Hopelessly Devoted to You» from Grease	«Las 12» by Ana Mena	«Bona nit» by Els Pets	«Rise Like a Phoenix» by Conchita Wurst	«Waterloo» by ABBA		«Born This Way» by Lady Gaga	«Remena, nena» by Guillermina Motta	«I Wanna Dance with Somebody (Who Loves Me)» by Whitney Houston	«Release Me» by Agnes	«Memory» from the musical Cats	«One night only» from the musical Dreamgirls; «Vestida de nit» by Sílvia Pérez Cruz
Carla	«Never Enough» by Loren Allred	«Kings & Queens» by Ava Max	«És inútil continuar» by Sau	«Don't You Worry 'bout a Thing» by Tori Kelly	«Per la bona gent» by Manel	«When We Were Young» by Adele		«Girls Just Wanna Have Fun» by Cyndi Lauper	«Una cançó» by Julen	«River Deep – Mountain High» by Ike & Tina Turner	«Cara de cul» byOques Grasses	«When Loves Takes Over» by David Guetta; «La rosa» from the musical El Petit Príncep	«Don't rain on my parade» from the musical Funny girl; «Celebrem» by Miki Núñez
Sofia	«Flowers» by Miley Cyrus	«Et porto sota la pell» by Cole Porter	«Never Gonna Not Dance Again» by Pink	«Superfashion» by Macedònia	«Snap» by Rosa Linn	«Never Really Over» by Katy Perry		«És superfort» by Josmar Gerona	«Let's Get Loud» by Jennifer Lopez	«Thats What I Want» by Lil Nas X	«Eloïse» by Tino Casal	«Like a Prayer» by Madonna; «Perra» by Rigoberta Bandini	
Tomàs	«Suspicious Minds» by Elvis Presley	«Wake Me Up Before You Go-Go» by Wham!	«En Tres Minuts» by Manu Guix	«Radio Ga Ga» by Queen	«Umbrella» by Rihanna	«Felicità» by Al Bano and Romina Power		«Coti x Coti» by The Tyets	«It's Not Unusual» by Tom Jones	«Paraules d'amor» by Joan Manuel Serrat	«Run Boy Run» by Woodkid	«Radioactive» by Imagine Dragons; «Qualsevol nit pot sortir el sol» by Sisa	
Elena	«Shoop-shoop song» by Cher	«Vivir Así es Morir de Amor» by Camilo Sesto (Note: She sang Nathy Peluso's version)	«La Vie en rose» by Édith Piaf	«Illes dins d'un riu» by Tomeu Penya	«Hung Up» by Madonna	«The bright sight» by Stay Homas and Oques Grasses		«Mujer contra mujer» by Mecano	«Don't Call Me Up» by Mabel	«Halo» by Beyoncé	«Cabaret» by Liza Minnelli		
Paula	«Firework» by Katy Perry						«It's All Coming Back to Me Now» by Jim Steinman (Note: She sang Céline Dion's version.)	«Girl on Fire» by Alicia Keys	«Desátame» by Mónica Naranjo	«Ventiladors» by Zoo			
Carlos	«Que bonica la vida» by Nil Moliner	«We Don't Talk Anymore» by Charlie Puth	«Només vull amor» by Siderland	«Tu me dejaste de querer» by C. Tangana	«I'm Still Standing» by Elton John		«Ningú més que tu» by Pablo Alborán	«Les nits no moren mai» by Doctor Prats	«Bad» by Michael Jackson				
Clàudia	«Good 4 U» by Olivia Rodrigo	«LLYLM» by Rosalía	«Déjà vu» by Scorpio	«About Damn Time» by Lizzo	«Fil de llum» by Andreu Rifé	«Que passa nen» by Alizz		«Creu-me» by Beta					
Jan	«Another Love» by Tom Odell	«In My Blood» by Shawn Mendes	«Angels» by Robbie Williams	«Supermercat» by Lildami	«Som ocells» by Nil Moliner	«Sucker» by Jonas Brothers	«Que tinguem sort» by Lluís Llach						
Domènec	«De l'1 al què» by The Tyets	«I'm Not Here to Make Friends» by Sam Smith	«As It Was» by Harry Styles	«Sorry» by Justin Bieber			«Beso» by Rosalía & Rauw Alejandro						
Emmi	«Amor del bo» by Rozalén & Sílvia Pérez Cruz	«Holding Out for a Hero» by Bonnie Tyler	«Levitating» by Dua Lipa				«Wannabe» by Spice Girls						
Natàlia	«Toxic» by Britney Spears	«Tu juru ju» by Julieta	«Shake it Off» by Taylor Swift				«Into You» by Ariana Grande						
Nei	«Butter» by BTS	«Loviu Baby» by Doctor Prats					«Mamma Knows Best» by Jessie J						
Hèctor	«El Peu de Guerra» by Els Catarres						«I Wanna Be Your Slave» by Måneskin						
Ethan	«Elefants» by Oques Grasses						«S'ha acabat» by Els Pets						
Guest artists		«Primavera» by Judit Nedderman	«La nit sembla que serà nostra» by Els Amics de les Arts	«Jugular» & «CBD i esperdenyes» by Triquell	«La nit està que crema» by Buhos	«Nochentera» by Vicco	«New Orleans» by Koko Jean & The Tonics	«Girem-ho tot» by Núria López	«La cadena» by Edu Esteve	«Al ritme que jo canto» by Mariona Escoda	«Nenes presumides» by Scorpio	«Gelat» by Miki Núñez	Medley of «Som ocells» and «Dos primaveras» by Nil Moliner
Guest artists		«Primavera» by Judit Nedderman	«La nit sembla que serà nostra» by Els Amics de les Arts	«Jugular» & «CBD i esperdenyes» by Triquell	«La nit està que crema» by Buhos	«Nochentera» by Vicco	«New Orleans» by Koko Jean & The Tonics	«La nòria» by Stay Homas	«Eufòria» by Mazoni	«Al ritme que jo canto» by Mariona Escoda	«Ja no m'importa» by Sara Roy	«Gelat» by Miki Núñez	«Jo t'estimo igual» by Lildami and Jim

=== Season 3 ===
==== Solo performances ====
	Gala 1	Gala 2	Gala 3	Gala 4	Gala 5	Gala 6	Gala 7	Gala 8	Gala 9	Gala 10	Gala 11	Gala 12 (Note: For this gala, the contestants sang two different songs.)	Gala 13
Lluís	«Quan tot s'enlaira» by Txarango	«Angels like you» by Miley Cyrus	«Bailoteo» by The Tyets	«Lose control» by Teddy Swims	«Wa yeah!» by Antònia Font	«Baby» by Justin Bieber	«Massstimas» by Edu Esteve	«Corren» by Gossos and Macaco	«Beautiful things» by Benson Boone	«Satisfaction» by The Rolling Stones	«Grup de pop» by Sexenni and The Tyets	«Que esclati tot» by Siderland; «This is the last time» by Keane	«Que boig el món» by Lax'n'Busto; «Wrecking ball» by Miley Cyrus
Julien	«Benvolgut» by Manel	«Tu es foutu» by In-Grid	«It's a beautiful day» byMichael Bublé	«La gavina» by Marina Rossell i Figueras	«Hungry heart» by Bruce Springsteen	«Papaoutai» by Stromae	«Seguirem Ballant» by Doctor Prats and Stay Homas	«Go The Distance» by Michael Bolton	«Great balls of fire» by Jerry Lee Lewis	«Bon dia» byEls Pets	«Industry baby» by Lil Nas X	«Baby don't hurt me» by David Guetta, Anne-Marie and Coi Leray	«Uptown funk» by Mark Ronson and Bruno Mars; «Va com va» byOvidi Montllor
Maria	«Because the night» by Patti Smith	«No se ve» by Emilia	«Road trip» by Triquell	«Blank space» by Taylor Swift	«Hold me closer» by Cornelia Jakobs	«Clava't» by Duble Buble	«Dance alone» by Sia and Kylie Minogue	«Training Season» by Dua Lipa	«Llença't» by Lax'n'Busto	«Symphony» by Clean Bandit	«The show must go on» by Queen	«Creep» by Radiohead; «M'agrada» by Gertrudis, Macaco and David Ros	«Proud Mary» de Tina Turner; «La gran eufòria» by Joan Dausà
Misty	«Lokura» by Julieta	«Girl gone wild» byMadonna	«Torn» by Natalie Imbruglia	Opening by Cardcaptor Sakura	«Eternal flame» by The Bangles	«Anestèsia total» byAl·lèrgiques al Pol·len	«Diamonds» by Rihanna	«Hot n cold» by Katy Perry	«Xao xao» by Scorpio	«Judas» by Lady Gaga	«La revolució sexual» by La Casa Azul	«Sparkling diamonds» from Moulin Rouge; «Cal que neixin flors a cada instant» by Lluís Llach	
Valeria	«Me quedo contigo» by Los ChunguitosRosalía's version	«Padam padam» by Kylie Minogue	«Els teus ulls» byAlfred Garcia	«What was i made for?» by Billie Eilish	«I have nothing» by Whitney Houston	«Sobe son» by Melody	«Pare» by Joan Manuel Serrat	«Valerie» by Amy Winehouse and Mark Ronson	«Puntería» by Shakira and Cardi B	«El cant dels ocells»	«Lobo» by Elena Gadel	«Sort de tu» by Oques Grasses; «Single ladies» by Beyoncé	
Fredrik	«Rosó» by Josep Ribas and Gabriel and Miquel Poal-AregallObeses's version	«If I could turn back time» by Cher	«SOS» byABBA	«Grande amore» by Il Volo	«Medicina» by Siderland	«Always on My Mind» by Pet Shop Boys				«All by myself» by Céline Dion	«Sent amb mi» by A-ha		
Xavi Noms	«Maneater» by Daryl Hall and John Oates	«Dance the night» by Dua Lipa	«Envia'm un àngel» by Sau	«Don't leave me this way» by The Communards	«Jo mai mai» by Joan Dausà	«Versace on the floor» by Bruno Mars	«Arcade» by Duncan Laurence	«Ara» by Nil Moliner	«Nothing compares 2 U» by Sinéad O'Connor	«A poc a poc» by Doctor Prats			
Aina Da Silva	«S&M» by Rihanna	«Lxs Nxnxs» by Roba Estesa	«Starships» by Nicki Minaj	«Et deixo la mà» by Mariona Escoda and Sendra	«Million dollar baby» byAva Max	«Amor sagaç» by Clara Peya	«Dance again» by Jennifer Lopez	«Dancing in the Moonlight» by Toploader	«Today is the day» by Buhos and Mar Lucas				
Lluna	«Chandelier» by Sia	«4 vents» by Samantha	«Vampire» by Olivia Rodrigo	«Sembla mentida» by Mushkaa	«Girlfriend» by Avril Lavigne	«2 be loved» by Lizzo	«Quédate conmigo» by Pastora Soler	«Vull Estar Amb Tu» by Els Catarres					
Bita	«Sempre de nou hi ha un matí» by Pasión Vega	«Rich girl» by Gwen Stefani	«La Rosa» by Bette Midler and Manu Guix	«Love on top» by Beyoncé	«Cari» by Julieta	«Ja no ens passa» by Els Amics de les Arts	«Tant de bo» by Suu						
Pau Culleré	«This love» by Maroon 5	«Vinc d'un poble» by Judit Neddermann	«Rock DJ» by Robbie Williams	«La platja» by Stay Homas and The Tyets	«I don't care» by Justin Bieber and Ed Sheeran								
Rangel	«Rush» by Troye Sivan	«Llimona i sal» by Coco	«Maníaca» by Abraham Mateo	«Man in the mirror» by Michael Jackson	«La petita rambla del poble-sec» by Cesk Freixas								
Yuk	«Mussegu» by Figa Flawas	«These boots are made for walkin’» by Jessica Simpson	«I love it» by Icona Pop and Charli XCX										
Dounia	«Yes and?» by Ariana Grande	«Paraules paraules» by Núria Feliu											
Tamara	«La meva sort» by Ginestà												
Hugo	«Blinding lights» by The Weeknd												
Group songs	«Don't stop me now» by Queen								«Human» by The Killers				«Viva la vida» by Coldplay
Guest artists		«Hundred miles» by Gabriela Richardson	«Covards» by La Fúmiga	«Cada tren» by Flashy Ice Cream	«Todo cambia» by Dani Fernández	«La guspira» by La Pegatina	«Q no» by Sofia Coll	«Vine» by Jim	«Dins del meu cap» by Miki Núñez	«Llamas en el cielo» by Alfred García	«Pura geografia» by Maria Jaume	«Bon dia vida» by Gertrudis	«Que vinguis» by The Tyets
Guest artists		«Hundred miles» by Gabriela Richardson	«Covards» by La Fúmiga	«Cada tren» by Flashy Ice Cream	«Todo cambia» by Dani Fernández	«La guspira» by La Pegatina	«Sushi Shanghai» by Lal'ba	«Et confesso» by Elena Gadel	«Globus» by Renaldo & Clara	«Solucions i no problemes» by Figa Flawas	«Pura geografia» by Maria Jaume	«Bon dia vida» by Gertrudis	«Que vinguis» by The Tyets

==== Performances in pairs ====
Gala 11	Contestants	Song
Gala 11	Misty and Lluís	«Shallow» by Bradley Cooper and Lady Gaga
Gala 11	Maria and Valeria	«No more tears (enough is enough)» by Donna Summer and Barbra Streisand
Gala 11	Julien and Fredrik	«Don't let the sun go down on me» by Elton John and George Michael

=== Season 4 ===
==== Solo performances ====
	Gala 1	Gala 2	Gala 3	Gala 4	Gala 5	Gala 6	Gala 7	Gala 8	Gala 9	Gala 10	Gala 11	Gala 12	Gala 13
Aina Machuca	«Where Have You Been» by Rihanna	«Thelma & Louise» by Belen Aguilera	«Let it Be» by The Beatles	«End of Time» by Beyoncé	«Dama de Mallorca» by Maria Hein	«Vogue» by Madonna	«Noia de Porcellana» by Pau Riva	«El Temps» by Roger Padrós	«Televisio» by	«When I Grow Up» by The Pussycat Dolls	«Voilà» by Barbara Pravi	«Unholy» by Sam Smith & Kim Petras	«Show Me How You Burlesque» from Burlesque; «Flor de Nit» by Dagoll Dagom
Monique	«Virtual Insanity» by Jamiroquai	«Respect» by Aretha Franklin	«Carinyo» by Svetlana	«Tears» by Sabrina Carpenter	«Sax» by Fleur East	«Mireu com va, mireu com ve» by Núria Feliu	«Where is My Husband!» by Raye	«Dia i Nit» by Cole Porter	«One Way or Another» by Blondie	«Un núvol blanc» by Lluis Llach	«Rehab» by Amy Whinehouse	«Envidia» by Nathy Peluso; «Everybody's Changing» by Keane	«Goldfinger» by Shirley Bassey; «La Salsa»
Tura	«Birds of a Feather» by Billie Eilish	«Cançó de Matinada» by Joan Manuel Serrat	«Venus» by Shocking Blue	«I Just Might» by Bruno Mars	«La Clau del Foc» by Sisa	«No One» by Alicia Keys	«Pau» by Els Pets	«California Gurls» by Katy Perry	«El Vestir d'en Pasqual» by Nuria Feliu	«Hurt» by Christina Aguilera	«Si Vens» by	«Una Lluna a l'Aigua» by Txarango; «Without You» by Mariah Carey	«Tu Mou-Lo» by OKDW; «Marry the Night» by Lady Gaga
Clara	«No Tears Left to Cry» by Ariana Grande	«Tití Me Preguntó» by Bad Bunny	«A Margalida» by John Isaac	«Hallucinate» by Dua Lipa	«Tots els Botons» by Beth	«Samba do Brasil» by Bellini	«País estrany» by Lluis Llach	«Killing Me Softly» by Roberta Flack	«Midnight Sun» by Zara Larsson	«Superestrella» by Aitana	«Rhythm of The Night» by Corona	«Papi» by Jennifer Lopez; «Jo Vinc d'un Silenci» by Raimon	
Oliver	«Només Ho Faig Per Tu» by Sal	«Livin' on a Prayer» by Bon Jovi	«Olívia» by The Tyets	«I Promised Myself» by Nick Kamen	«Full Time Papi» by Guitarricadelafuente	«Let Me Love Ya» by Siderland	«La Incondicional» by Luis Miguel	«Ja Dormiré» by La Fúmiga & Figa Flawas	«Que Bonic» by Víctor Arbelo	«Livin' la Vida Loca» by Ricky Martin		«When I Was Your Man» by Bruno Mars; «A-Ba-Ni-Bi» by El Chaval de la Peca	
Daniela	«Over the Rainbow»	«Supersta» by Jamelia	«Només Viure» by Ginesta	«One Moment in Time» by Whitney Houston	«I will Love Again» by Lara Fabian	«Carinyu Meu» by Ginesta	«Price Tag» by Jessie J	«Se Fue» by Laura Pausini	«Diva» by	«Divinize» by Rosalía	«Fins Que Arribi l'Alba» by Els Catarres		
Aida	«Good Luck Babe!» by Chappell Roan	«Nenes de Ciutat» by Alosa	«Funk» by Earth, Wind & Fire	«Roses» by La Oreja de Van Gogh	«A La Fresca» by Figa Flawas			«Hold My Hand» by Jess Glynne	«Set Fire to the Rain» by Adele	«Camins» by Sopa de Cabra			
Lluis	«Com dues Gotes d'Aigua» by Manu Guix	«Good Luck Babe!» by Chappell Roan	«Mai Trobaràs» by Sopa De Cabra	«Roses» by La Oreja de Van Gogh	«Les Merdes» by Stay Homes	«Let Me Love Ya» by Siderland	«Sexy and I Know it» by LMFAO	«Fantastic Shine» by Love of Lesbian	«El Fin del Mundo» by La La Love You				
Arian	«Out of Body» by Khalid	«Et Prometo» by Ivan Herzog	«My Number One» by Helena Paparizou	«Roses» by La Oreja de Van Gogh	«El Temps» by Roger Padrós	«Festuk» by Markos Amb K	«Faith» by George Michael	«Serem Ocells» by Oques Grasses					
Gerard	«Rikiti» by Mama Dousha	«It's Gonna Be Me» by NSYNC	«Soda Pop» by Saja Boys	«Estrella» by Nicky Jam	«Sway» by Michael Buble	«Bicicletes» by Blaumut	«Together Forever» by Rick Astley						
Noa	«1 Cumbia Amb El Guillem» by Mushkaa	«The Fate of Ophelia» by Taylor Swift	«La Bachateta» by Tacho	«No EtFiis de la Calma» by Marina Rossell	«I Was Made For Lovin' You» by Kiss	«Alejandro» by Lady Gaga							
Ian	«Alors on Danse» by Stromae	«Per fer-te una idea» by Renaldo & Clara	«In Your Eyes» by Kylie Minogue	«Mon Cheri Go Home» by FADES and Maria Jaume									
Blasco	«4 Kissus» by Figa Flawas	«Love Yourself» by Justin Bieber	«I Don't Wanna Wait» by David Guetta & OneRepublic										
Irene	«La Perla» by Rosalía	«DMS» by Ouineta											
Emma	«Wonderwall» by Oasis												
Pau	«Com El Dia I La Nit» by Oques Grasses												
Carla													

==== Performances in pairs ====
Gala 11	Contestants	Song
Gala 11	Aina Machuca and Tura	«Beautiful Liar» by Beyonce and Shakira
Gala 11	Monique and Oliver	«Die With a Smile» by Lady Gaga and Bruno Mars
Gala 11	Daniela and Clara	«For Good» from Wicked
