= Vuit =

Catalan pop rock band

- Origin: Catalonia, Spain
- Genre: Pop rock
- Years active: 2009–present
- Labels: Blanco y Negro, Picap
- Members: Carlos Martíncez, Òscar Villoria, Llorenç Anguer
- Website: www.vuit.cat

Vuit is a Catalan pop rock band formed in 2009. The members of the group are Carlos Martínez, Òscar Villoria and Llorenç Anguer.

== Trajectory ==
Vuit was founded in 2009 by Carlos Martínez (singer and guitarist) and Ramon Hernández Moscoso (partner, electric guitarist and producer of the first disk of the band). But it wasn't until later that Òscar (drummer) and Llorenç (bass and chorus) entered the group. Finally the group consisted of three members: Martínez, Villoria, and Anguer. All of them, get record on 2009 its first model of the songs that later will be its first studio disk “Un dia qualsevol” (Any Other Day); a name that certainly, the same band explain it as follows: “...we started –the project– like any other day, for this reason we called this name at the disk. It was the day that we stayed in my home composing the first song of the disk, Julia. They uploaded Princesa at Myspace and Picap-discography.

Vuit is a Catalan pop-rock band whose music incorporates elements of alternative rock.

The name of the group (“Vuit”) usually wakes up the curiosity of the media, and the answer of this question is always the same “we met hardly all days at 8 o’clock to test, in fact, we did everything at 8 o’clock, and we decided to call us this”, Òscar in “Matins de TV3”. “...and Carlos said we will call VUIT, we look us and we knew that it was the perfect name, we felt identificate with it and we liked the strong of this name.”, interview in Adolescents.

In 2011, Vuit put out their second album 15 dies i una nit (15 days and a night) with which they consolidated their trajectory. The collaborations of the disk: Manu Guix, Mikel Iglesias and Nil Cardoner. Manu Guix is unveiled like a sing teacher in the “Operación Triumfo” academy, but in the last years has been in solitary, this like his collaboration for a lot of Catalan groups, like the production of this disk. Mikel Iglesias and Nil Cardoner are actors of the TV3 series called Polseres Vermelles that has achieved the especial interest of Steven Spielberg and Marta Kauffman, co-creator of the mythical series Friends. Polseres Vermelles has propulsated at the success Teràpia de Shock and "els Vuit" and it has been bought for the American channel ABC that it thinks to do an arrangement that will be called “The red band society” and it will be on TV for the rest of Spain by Antena 3 (without count a possible second emission of new chapters and it will be amited at the same time by TV3). Polseres Vermelles is about a group of boys and girls that they match in a hospital because they have illnesses. Without they exit of their especial circumstances that they are, the story about this six boys and teenagers shows as the anecdotes and situations of this boys and girls of the same age, but with the difference that their world is a hospital.

Their second single, “Dorm”, has the collaboration of Nil Cardoner and Mikel Iglesias and it has been nominated like other successful groups “Els Catarres”, “Obrint pas” or “Amelie” at the best “Videoclip of the Year” in the Enderrock Awards Enderrock Awards 2012.

== Discography ==
“Un dia qualsevol"(Any Other Day)

- 1. Cada cop
- 2. Tornarem
- 3. Júlia
- 4. Princesa
- 5. Crida
- 6. El teu moment
- 7. Sempre al teu costat
- 8. Ara
- 9. L'univers
- 10. Tu tens

“15 dies i una nit”(15 days and a night)

- 1. Dorm
- 2. Fuig
- 3. Què vols de mi?
- 4. Com un nen petit
- 5. Un dia més
- 6. Qui són
- 7. Per un instant
- 8. Les nits
- 9. Parla'm del vent
- 10. Per tu
- 11. Tan ràpid
- 12. Sempre igual
- 13. Dorm (with Mikel Iglesias and Nil Cardoner, actors of"Polseres Vermelles" of TV3)
- 14. Com un nen petit (with Manu Guix, exteacher of Operación Triunfo academy)

"Recorda que..."

- 1. La nostra funció
- 2. Un camí per tornar
- 3. Afaga'm la mà
- 4. Aigua
- 5. Barbie de ciutat
- 6. Increïbles
- 7. Respira
- 8. He après
- 9. Una resposta
- 10. Ja fa anys
- 11. Somiaré
- 12. Sóc com sóc

=== Singles ===
“Un dia qualsevol”(Any Other Day)

- Cada cop
- Júlia
- Princesa
- Crida
- Tu tens (Polseres Vermelles’ podcast)
- Tornarem (Polseres Vermelles’ podcast)

“15 dies i una nit”(15 days and a night)

- Què vols de mi?
- Dorm
- Com un nen petit
- Ven (song in Spanish of "Dorm")

"Recorda que..."

- Un camí per tornar
