= Maria Hein =

Spanish singer (born 2003)

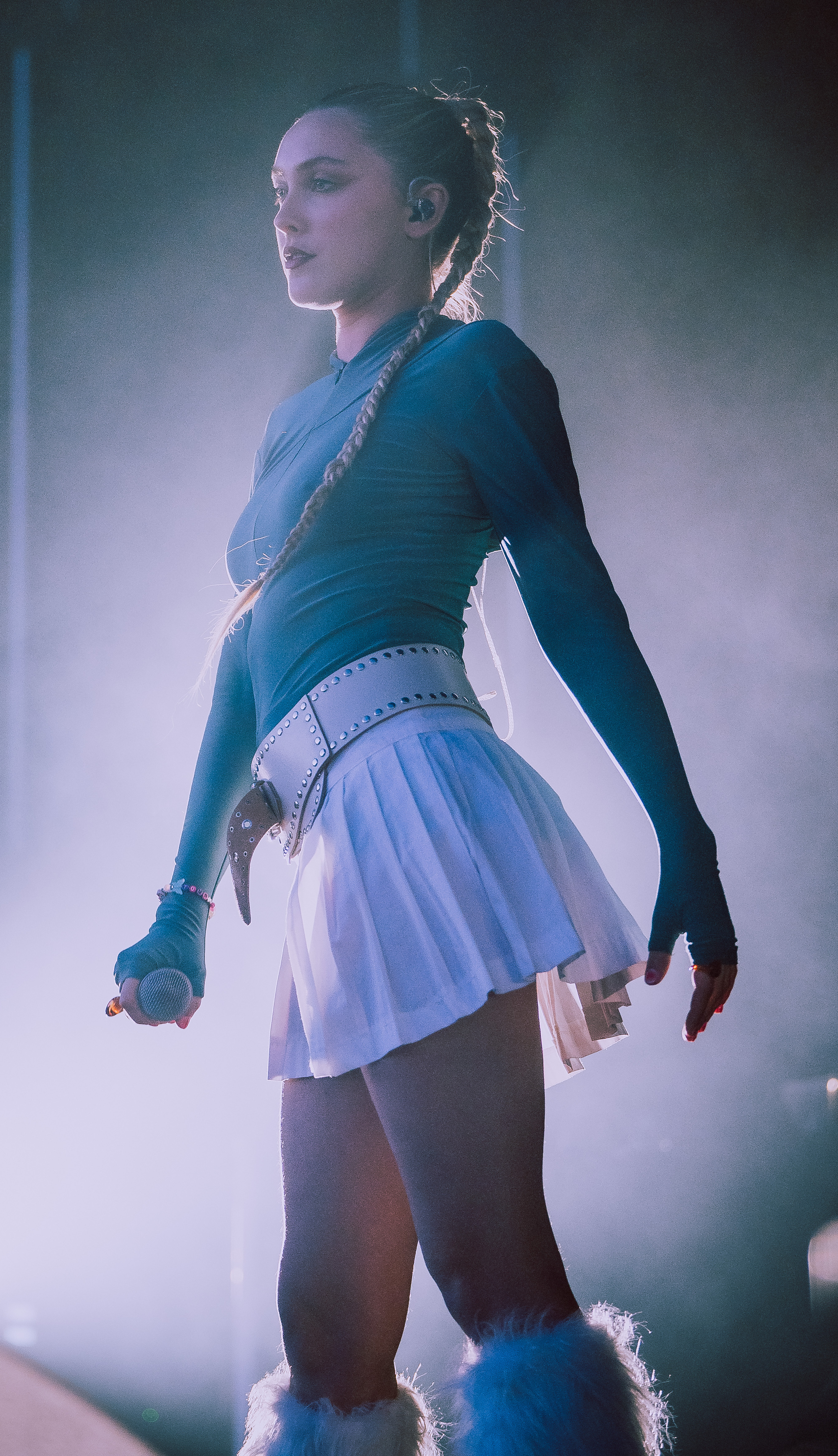
- At Òmnium Cultural's Festival Límbic 2024
- Born: Maria Hein Puig; 2 October 2003 (age 21); Felanitx, Balearic Islands, Spain
- Occupations: Singer; songwriter; producer
- Years active: 2020–present
- Musical career
- Instruments: Vocals; piano; guitar
- Labels: Primavera; Hidden Track

Maria Hein Puig (born 2 October 2003) is a Spanish singer, songwriter, and producer releasing music in Catalan language. She has released two studio albums, Continent i Contingut (2021) and Tot allò que no sap ningú (2023).

== Early life ==
Maria Hein Puig was born on 2 October 2003 in Felanitx, Balearic Islands, Spain, to a German father and Spanish mother. She began playing piano at the age of four. She continued her training as a pianist at the Liceu and later at the Taller de Músics in Barcelona. When she was in high school, she was a part of a cover group with four of her friends.

== Career ==
In 2020, Hein released her first song "Idò un cafe", then she was discovered by Hidden Track Records. She then signed a recording contract with the label. In September 2021, she performed at the annual festival La Mercè in Barcelona. In October 2021, she released her debut studio album Continent i Contingut. In November 2022, she won the fan-voted Best Singer-Songwriter Album for the album at the Enderrock Awards of Balearic Music. In February 2023, Hein released a collaborative single, "CLUB" with singer Julieta. In April 2023, she released new versions of her single "La Dama de Mallorca".

In mid-2023, she released two singles of her then-upcoming studio album, "FETS DE FIL" and "FIU FIUUU". She released her sophomore studio album Tot allò que no sap ningú in September 2023. She presented the album at the music event Mercado de Música Viva de Vich in 2023. In October 2023, she won another Enderrock Award of Balearic Music for Best Artist by Popular Vote. In November 2023, she embarked on a concert tour, Papallones Tour.

In February 2024, she released a single "HANA", her first release with Primavera Labels. In June 2024, she released a single with SOLUNA and MOED, "JUICY A MIDA".

== Artistry ==
Hein explores a variety of musical styles, ranging from traditional folk to pop music, with elements of electronica. Her debut album features acoustic and folk sounds, influenced by artists including Sílvia Pérez Cruz, Maria del Mar Bonet, and Joan Miquel Oliver. In contrast, her sophomore album incorporates a broader range of styles, including dancehall, hyperpop, and contemporary R&B, with influences from English music and K-pop.

== Discography ==
=== Studio albums ===
Title	Details
Continent i contingut	Released: 29 October 2021; Label: Hidden Track
TOT ALLÒ QUE NO SAP NINGÚ	Released: 29 September 2023; Label: Hidden Track, Pértiga

=== Singles ===
As lead artist

Title	Year	Album
"Idò un cafe"	2020	Non-album single
"Es teus ulls davant la mar"	2021	Continent i contingut
"No te veig"	2021	Non-album singles
"Sa teva presència"	2021	Continent i contingut
"CLUB" (with Julieta)	2023	Non-album single
"LA DAMA DE MALLORCA"	2023	Non-album single
"FETS DE FIL"	2023	TOT ALLÒ QUE NO SAP NINGÚ
"FIU FIUUU"	2023	TOT ALLÒ QUE NO SAP NINGÚ
"TEMPS" (featuring Mushkaa)	2023	TOT ALLÒ QUE NO SAP NINGÚ
"PEUS GELATS" (with Lluc and Galgo Lento)	2023	NADAL MIX 2023
"HANA"	2024	TBA
"MOCHI DE SAKURA" (featuring Aymí)	2024	TBA
"JUICY A MIDA" (featuring SOLUNA and Moed)	2024	TBA
"ALENAR" (featuring roots, Bexnil, Joan Lupi, and Camil Arcarazo)	2024	TBA

As featured artist

Title	Year	Album
"Gota Entre Gotes" (with Marga Rotger, Miquel Brunet, Júlia Colom, and Clara Fiol)	2022	Non-album single
"Els ocells" (Ginestà featuring Maria Hein)	2024	VIDA MEVA

=== Guest appearances ===
Title	Year	Other artist(s)	Album
"Morir d'un llamp"	2021	Marina Rossell, Ferran Palau	300 crits
"Ram"	2021	Ferran Palau	Joia
"Joia"	2021	Ferran Palau	Joia
"o"	2022	Salvatge Cor	CRUÏLLA
"SUPERGLUUU"	2022	Plan-ET	Kepler-454
"TU I JO"	2024	Ariox	ARIOX IS SUPER SAD
"NO ÉS REAL SI NO FA MAL"	2024	Xicu	SACRIFICIS
