= Stay Homas =

Spanish musical trio

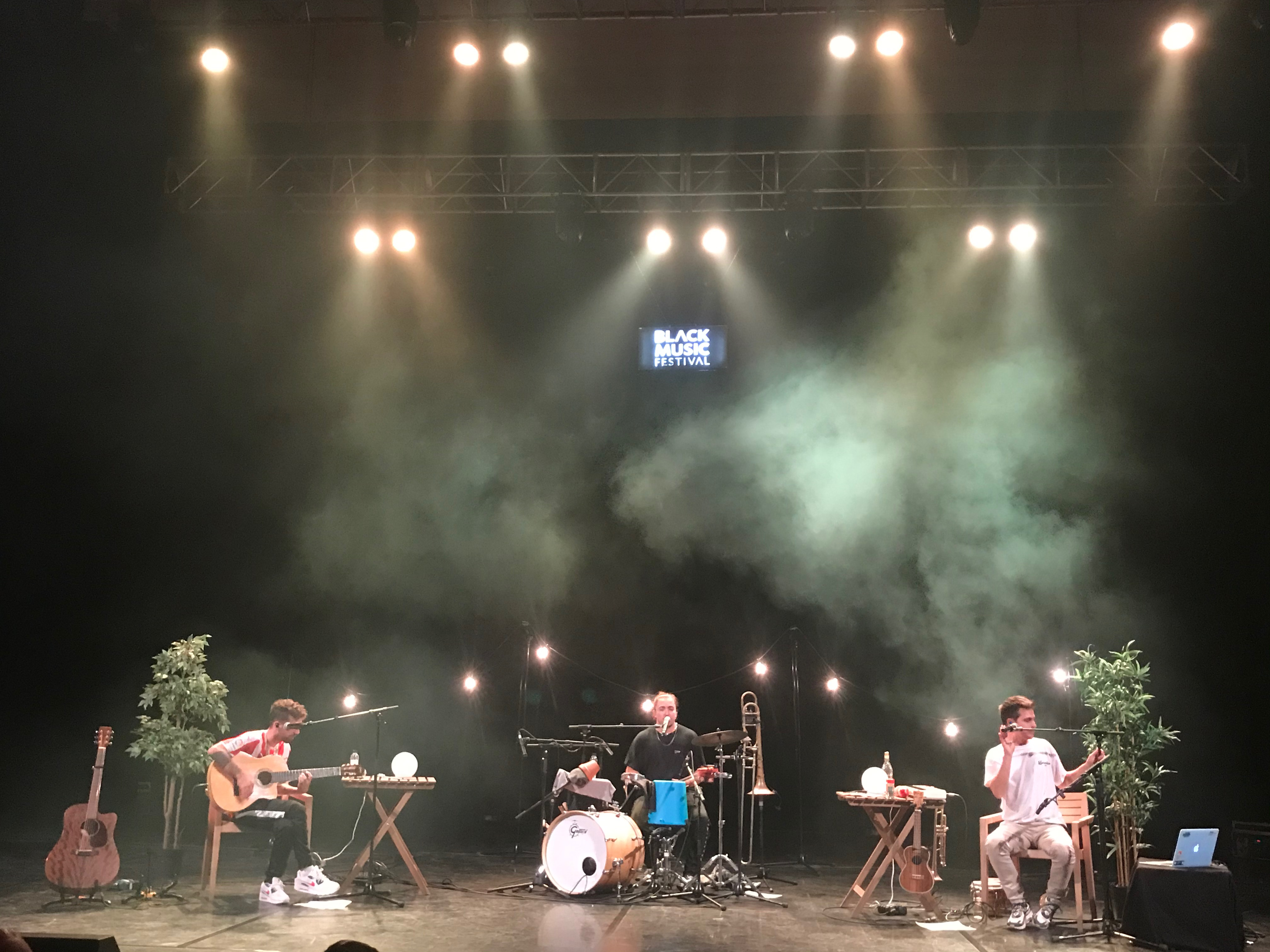
- Stay Homas at Girona's Auditorium in 2020

Background information
- Origin: Barcelona (Spain)
- Years active: 2020–present
- Label: Sony Music
- Members: Klaus Stroink Guillem Boltó Rai Benet
- Website: stayhomas.org

Stay Homas was a Catalan musical trio created due to the preventive lockdown to stop the spread of COVID-19 in the spring of 2020. Its members are: Klaus Stroink (trumpet player in Buhos, Nil Moliner, and Horny Section, and voice actor), Guillem Boltó (trombone player and singer in Doctor Prats) and Rai Benet (bass player in Buhos and Nil Moliner). They became roommates in a flat in the Eixample district of Barcelona a few months before the pandemic outbreak. The band's name, Stay Homas, comes from the English pandemic-era admonition to "stay home".

== History ==
=== Early days ===
Their first song, Confination I, was uploaded to Benet's Instagram account on March 14, 2020. They released their second song, Confination II, in Boltó's account the following day. Their third one, Del confineo III, was uploaded to Stroink's profile. Given the rapid success of the songs, they decided to create social media accounts with the band's name. Their songs, recorded on the balcony of their flat, use a humorous tone to talk about the preventive measures against COVID-19, life in self-isolation, and the feeling of frustration from not being able to leave the house. Their songs combine different languages: Catalan, English, Spanish and Portuguese.

The band members often invited other musicians to collaborate with them via mobile phone. Rubén Blades, Judit Neddermann, Sílvia Pérez Cruz, Macaco, Nil Moliner, Manu Chao, Oques Grasses, and Sr. Wilson made cameo appearances.

The quick spread of their music through social media made them known internationally. They were covered by several media outlets, including The New Yorker, CNN, and NPR. Their songs became cover versions around the world. Michael Bublé, for instance, adapted Gotta be patient with Barenaked Ladies and Mexican singer Sofía Reyes.

=== First releases ===
In early June 2020, they released the song XXIX: Let it out, the last one before taking a break that coincided with the end of the lockdown in Spain. They recorded three of their songs in a studio and released an EP at the beginning of July, with the title Desconfination. The members of Stay Homas announced in an Instagram Live that their first concert (on July 31, 2020) was sold out in 10 minutes. Given their success, they decided to organize more concerts.

In December 2020, they released their album Agua with Sony Music. Six of the twelve tracks were adaptations of songs they had previously sung on their balcony, while the rest were new. Stay Homas maintained the musical eclecticism, multiculturalism and multilingualism that had brought them fame.

To celebrate their first anniversary and prepare for their summer tour, Stay Homas released a second batch of ten songs in March 2021. Again, from their balcony, they kept their unique style, collaborating with Rita Payés, Juanito Makandé, Albert Pla, and Rubén Blades.

=== Agua tour ===
The release tour brought the band to forty different locations around Spain. Some of them, including Vida Festival and Canet Rock, were controversial due to their large audiences despite the alarming COVID-19 statistics. Another important concert was the one in Razzmatazz since it supposed to be re-opening of the venue. In December 2021, they were to visit Milan, Paris, Brussels, and London, with a Latin-American tour for 2022.

The group disbanded in 2025.

== Discography ==
- Desconfination (EP, 2020).
- Agua (LP, 2020).
- HOMAS (LP, 2023).

== Awards ==
- ARC Awards 2020:
  - Breakout artist
  - Innovative project during lockdown
- Enderrock Awards 2021:
  - Best pop-rock song, The bright side (amb Oques Grasses)
  - Best breakout artist
  - Best live performance
