= Oques Grasses =

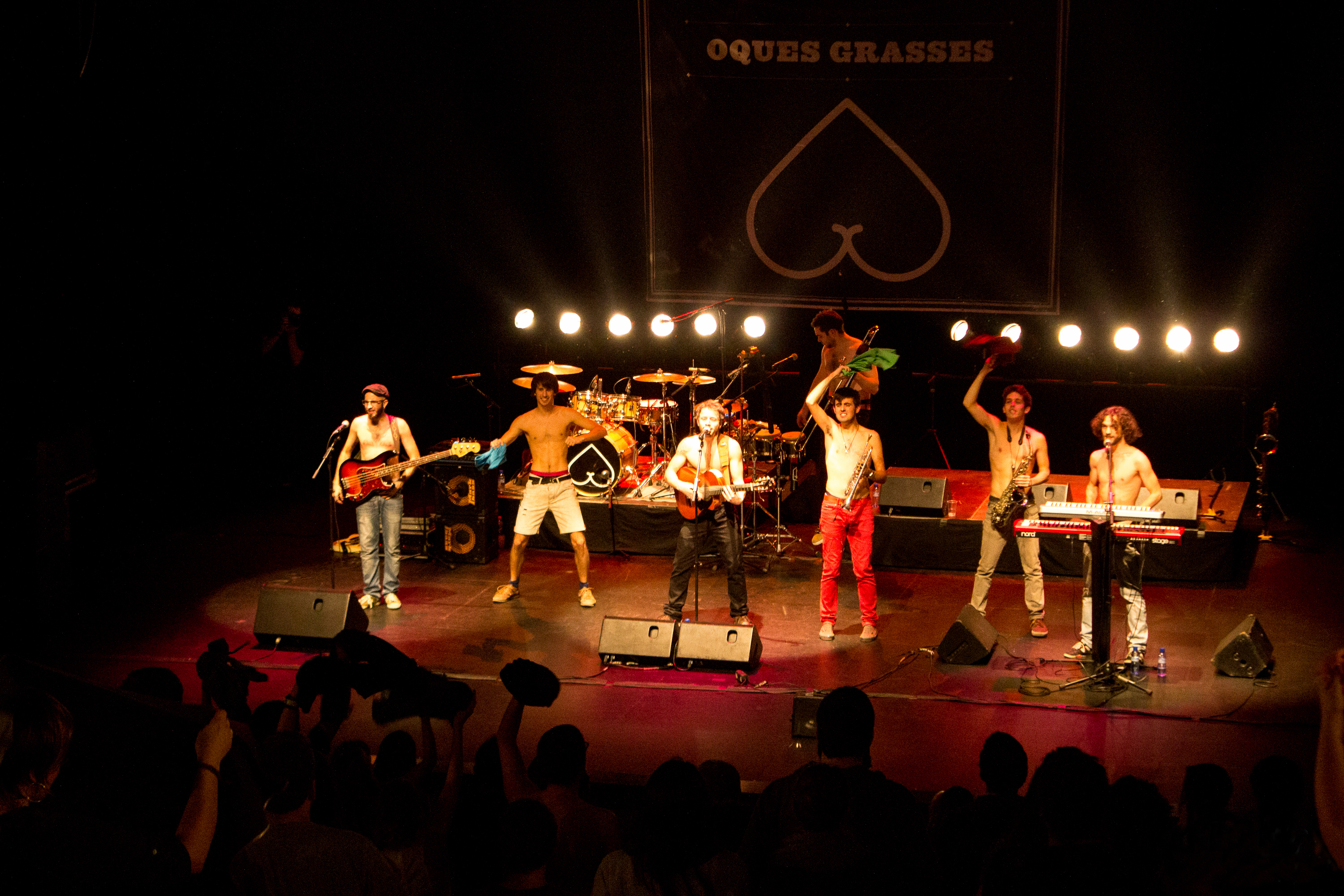
- Oques Grasses performing live

Background information
- Origin: Osona, Catalonia
- Genres: Pop, reggae, funk, dance, hip hop, folk, trap
- Years active: 2010–2026
- Labels: Chesapik, Beverly Hills Records, Halley Records

Oques Grasses was a Catalan music group formed in 2010 in the comarca of Osona, Catalonia. Their musical style is eclectic, mainly falling under pop. The band has been highly successful since its inception, performing numerous concerts throughout Catalonia and internationally, including appearances at Canet Rock and opening the Grec Festival in Barcelona in 2015.

== Career ==
Oques Grasses was formed in 2010, but they only became widely known after self-releasing their first album, Un dia no sé com, in 2012. The album was available for free download on their official website and was officially presented at a concert on 16 March 2013 at Sala Moscou in Torelló, featuring collaborations with Ernest Crusats (singer of La Iaia), Arnau Tordera i Prat of Obeses, and Ferran and Ricard of Strombers.

Their second album, Digue-n'hi com vulguis (2014), was released under the Chesapik label and maintained a distinctive reggae influence in five tracks. This work earned Oques Grasses the Enderrock Award for Best New Group, determined by popular vote. In June, they performed at the Summer Fest in Milwaukee and at the Summer Stage Festival in Central Park, New York. Their song «Així és el teu Nadal» was chosen as the Christmas song for TV3 and Catalunya Ràdio in the same year. On 26 March 2015, they won the Enderrock Award for Best Music Video for «Sexy», after five nominations.

The third album, You Poni (2016), produced by Marc Parrot and released by Beverly Hills Records, incorporated Jamaican, tropical, and funk sounds blended with the surrealistic imagination of singer and guitarist Josep Montero.

The fourth album, Fans del sol (2019), released by Halley Records, features tracks such as «In the night» and showcases musical quality, personality, and imagination. It contains a mix of funk, dance, hip-hop, folk, reggae, and trap. In early 2020, Oques Grasses received the Enderrock Award for Best Pop-Rock Album (popular vote) and the Critic’s Award for Best Artist. The band also received a Gold Record for sales of over 20,000 copies of Fans del Sol, a Platinum Record for over 40,000 digital sales of «In the night», and another Gold Record for over 20,000 digital sales of «Sta guai».

The fifth album, A tope amb la vida (2021), was conceived in a farmhouse in Muntanyola, with the single «Bye bye» released on 30 April and featuring collaborations with Rita Payés, Stay Homas, Santa Salut, and Doble.

On 28 January 2023, as the culmination of their 10th-anniversary tour, the band performed solo at the Palau Sant Jordi in Barcelona to a full house of 18,400 attendees, setting an attendance record.

Their sixth album, Fruit del Deliri (2024), represents a shift from previous albums, with no horns and much more use of synthesizers and samplers, including collaborations with Rita Payés, Al·lèrgiques al Pol·len, and Figa Flawas.

The band announced their farewell with a show at the Lluís Companys Stadium for October 10th, 2026. Tickets sold out in 21 minutes. Additional shows, which were sold-out, were programmed on October 5th, 7th and 9th, with the first of these being postponed to the 8th due to heavy rains affecting Barcelona.

== Style ==
Their musical style is varied; their first album lacked a strong definition as they preferred to avoid labels and surprise the audience. Their early work was mainly reggae-influenced with pop elements, later expanding to diverse genres in subsequent albums. Their lyrics often depict daily life events in a simple, direct manner, as if speaking to a friend.

== Members ==
Oques Grasses consists of seven members, most of whom studied at the Escola Superior de Música de Catalunya, except for singer Josep Montero and bassist Guillem Realp. The lineup is:

- Josep Montero – vocals, guitar
- Arnau Altimir – drums
- Joan Borràs – keyboards
- Guillem Realp – bass
- Miquel Biarnés – trombone
- Miquel Rojo – trumpet
- Josep Valldeneu – saxophone
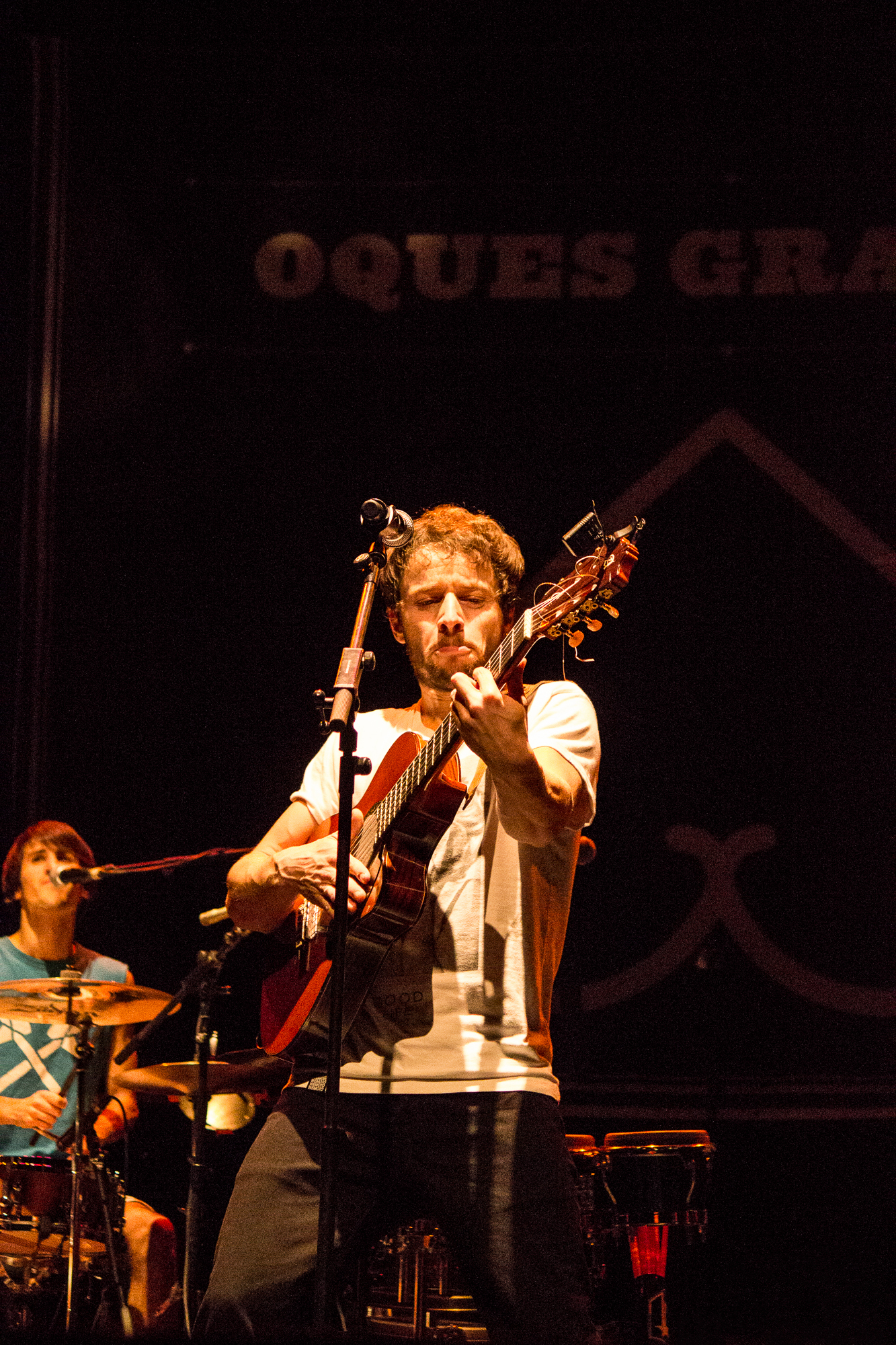
Josep Montero

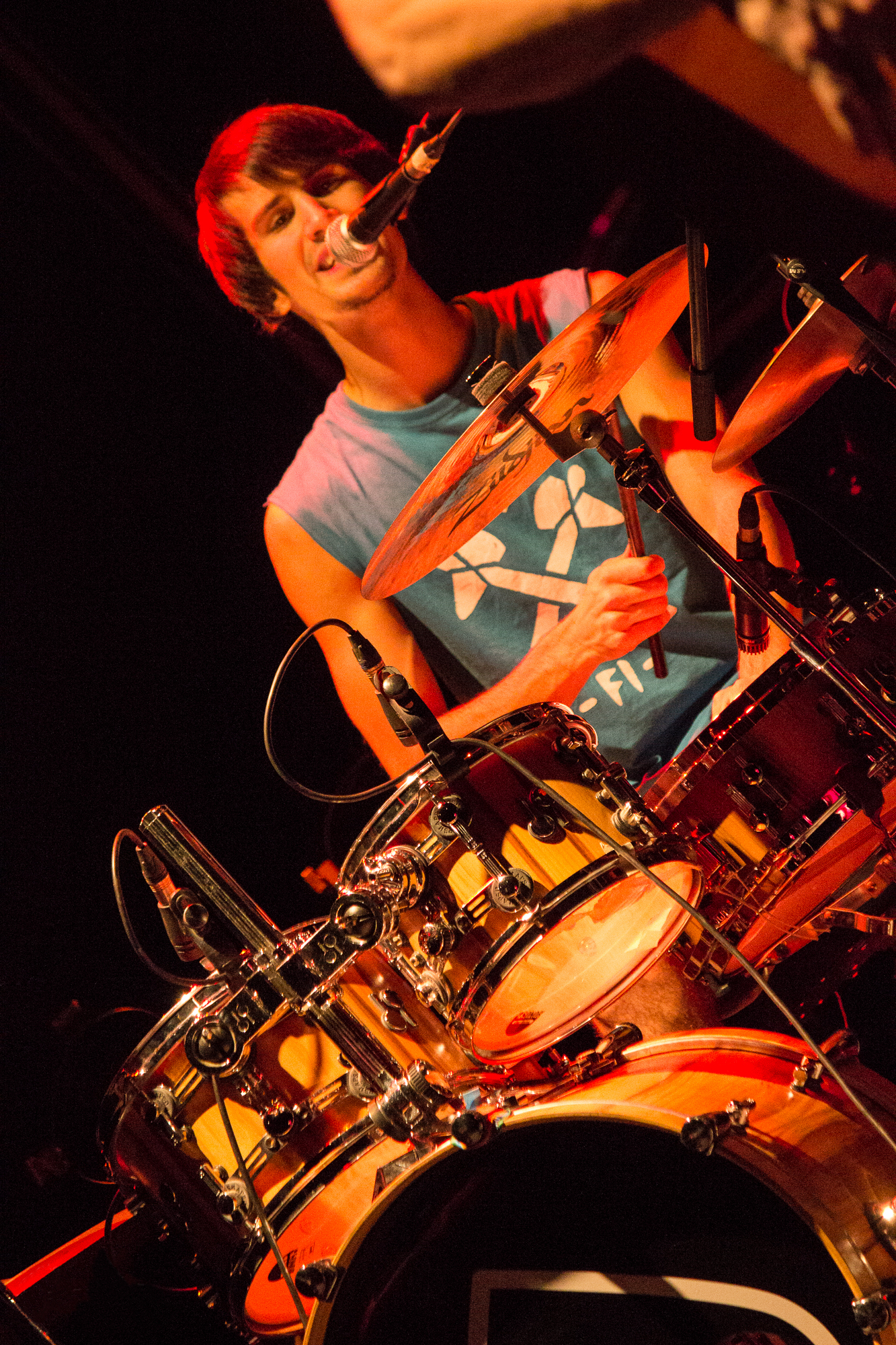
Arnau Altimir

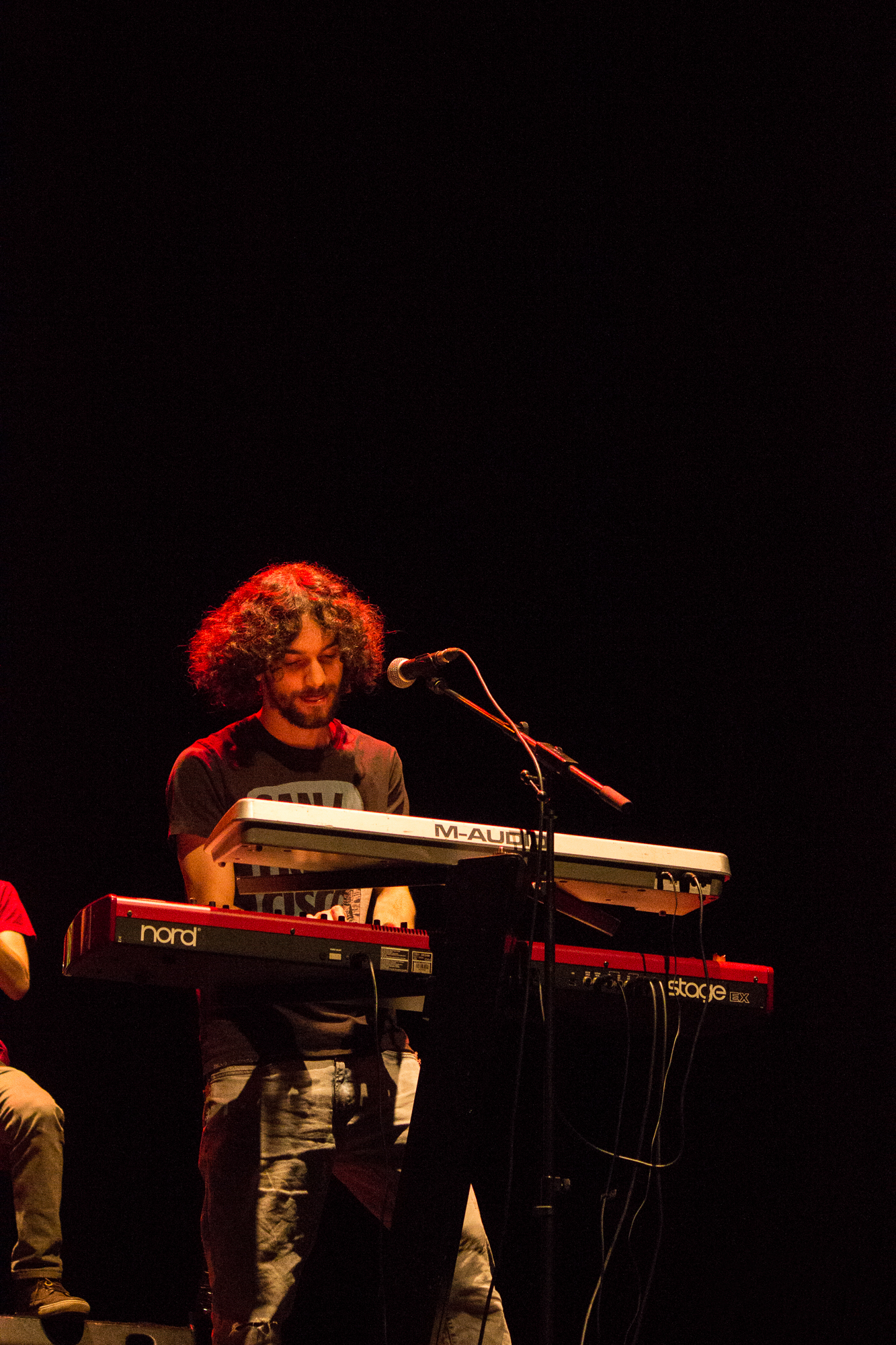
Joan Borràs

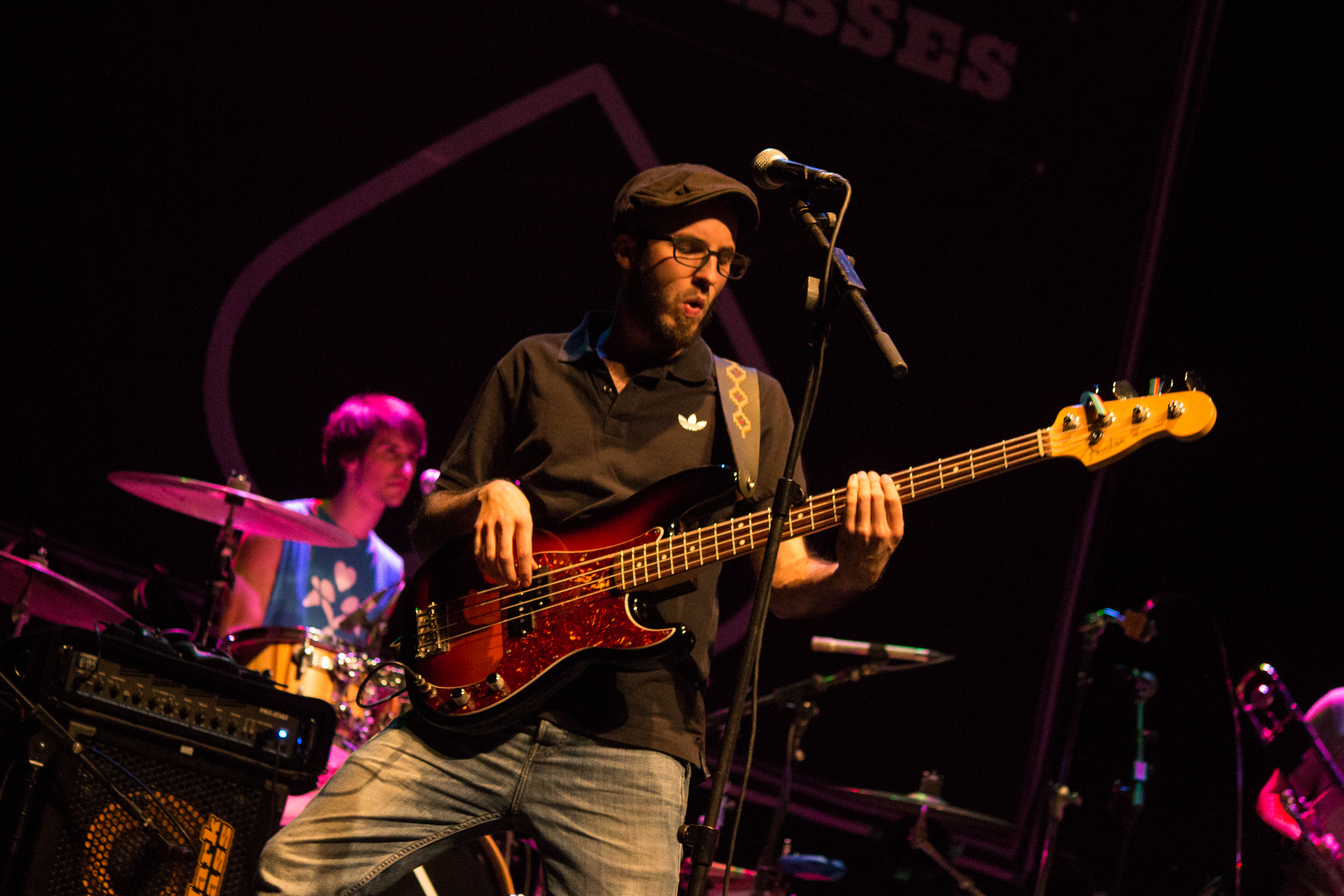
Guillem Realp

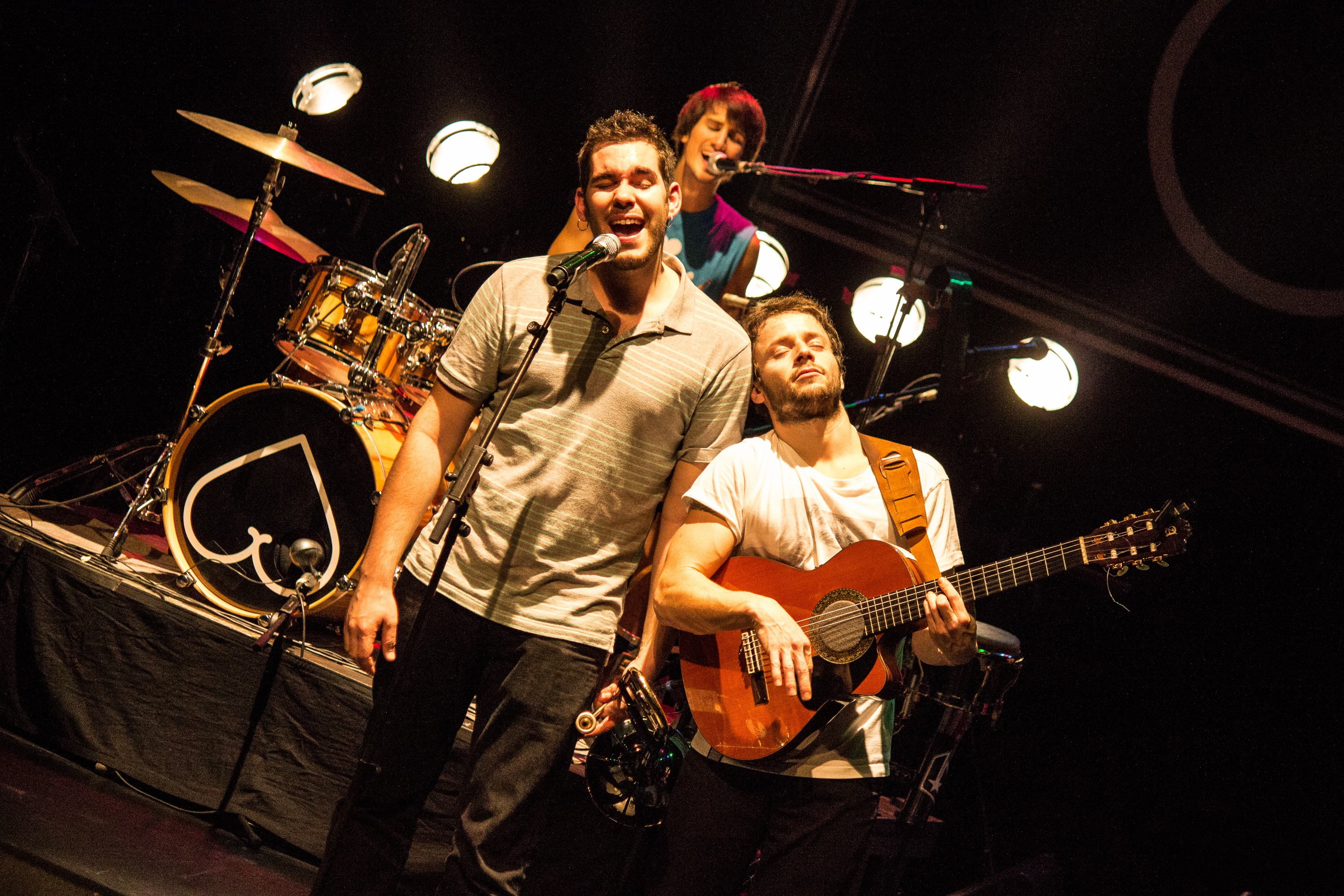
Miquel Biarnés

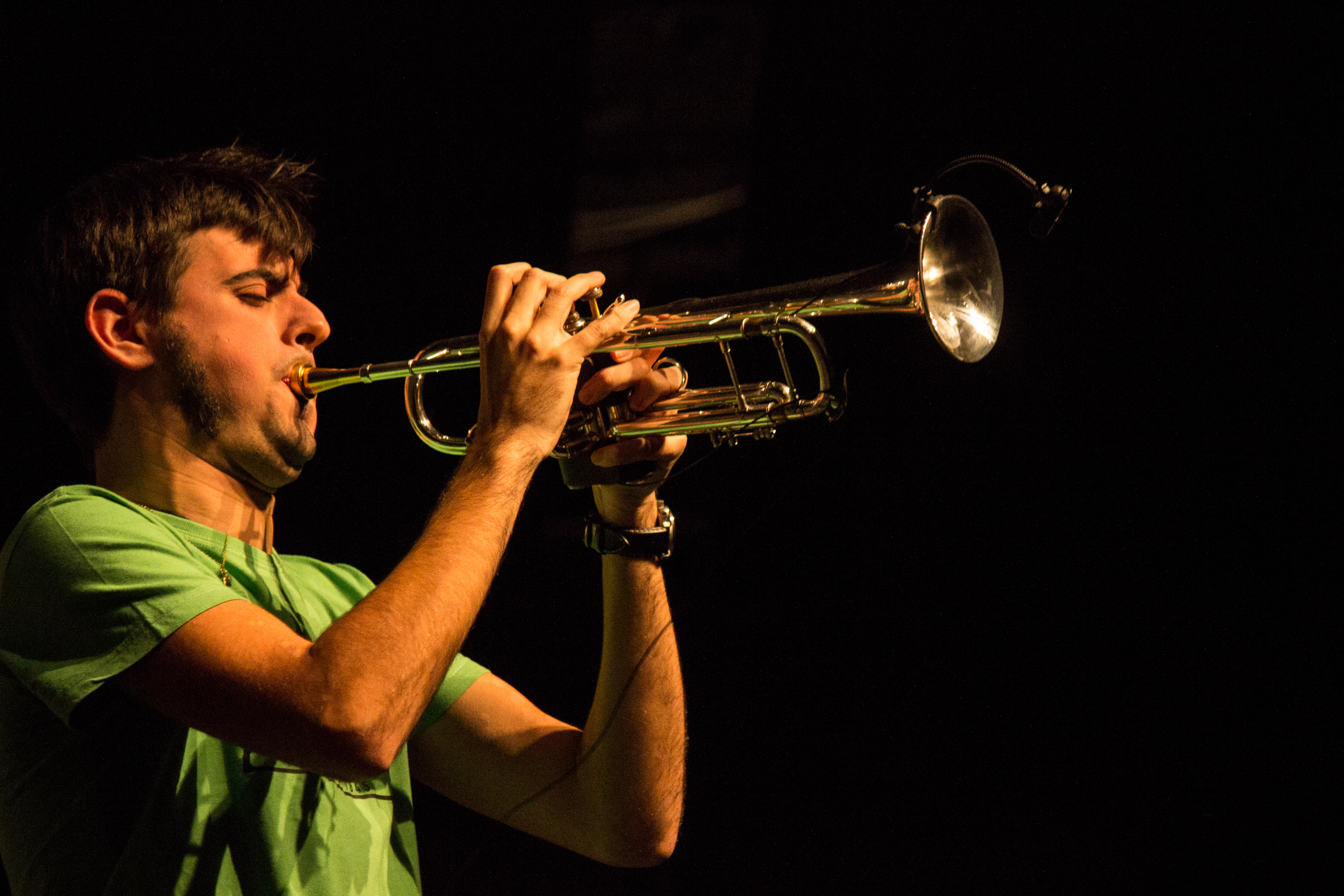
Miquel Rojo

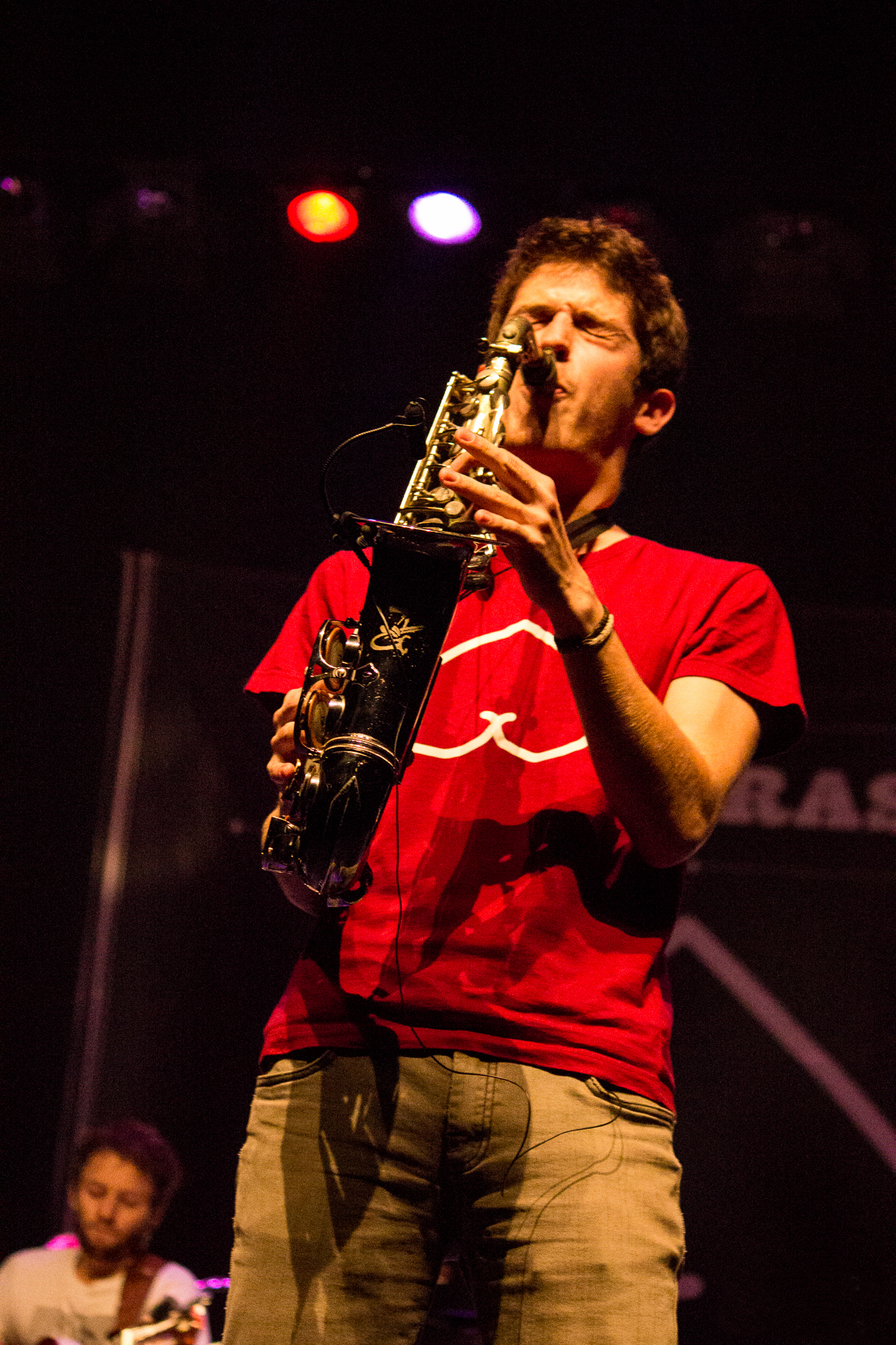
Josep Valldeneu

== Discography ==
- Un dia no sé com (2012)
- Digue-n'hi com vulguis (2014)
- You Poni (2016)
- Fans del sol (2019)
- A tope amb la vida (2021)
- Fruit del Deliri (2024)
