= The Tyets =

Catalan musical group

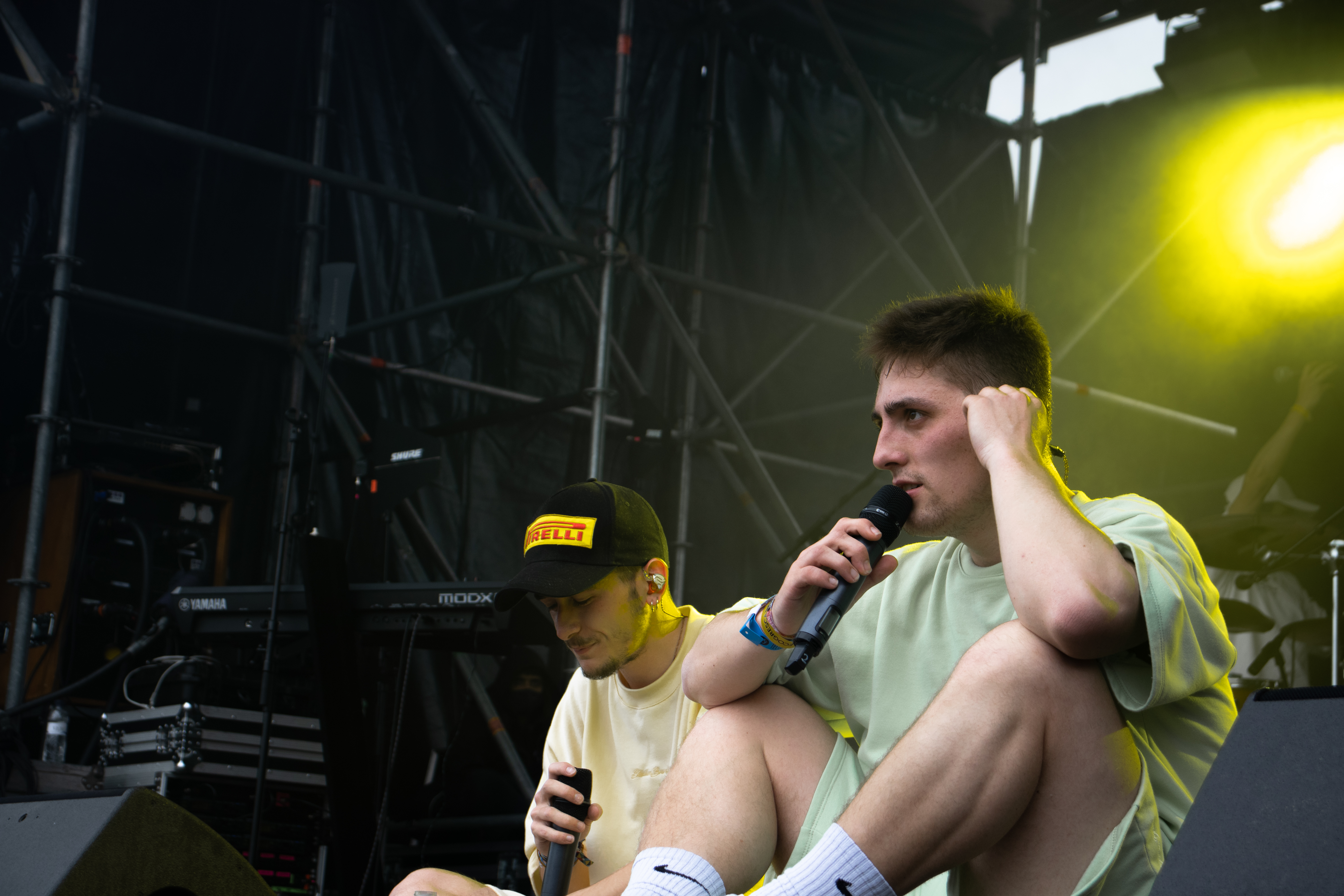
- The Tyets performing in 2021

Background information
- Also known as: Els Tiets
- Origin: Mataró, Catalonia, Spain
- Genres: Catalan urban; pop; reggaeton; trap
- Years active: 2019–present
- Label: Luup Records
- Members: Oriol Ramon; Xavier Coca
- Website: thetyets.com

The Tyets, also known as Els Tiets (IPA: [əls tiˈɛts]), are a Catalan music group. Their songs are primarily in Catalan, with a musical style that is a fusion of pop, Latin urban and trap. The two members of the group, Oriol Ramon and Xavier Coca, both grew up in Mataró.

They first gained recognition in 2019 with their debut EP, Trapetón (a portmanteau of "trap" and "reggaeton"), and became known for their lyrical style avoiding the typical subjects of either genre. Their 2023 single "Coti x Coti" was a major hit in Spain. Following the viral popularity on TikTok of "Coti x Coti", and the group's performance of the song at the Camp Nou stadium on Diada de Sant Jordi, The Tyets became the first Catalan-language group to achieve a million monthly streams on Spotify.

They have been credited with helping to create the genre of trapetón, a form of Latin trap, but with light-hearted, inoffensive lyrics.

The group's 2023 hit single "Coti x Coti" was notable for its novel incorporation of the traditional musical style of the sardana with contemporary popular music, and the song's popularity has been credited with an increase in interest in the traditional dance among young people in Catalonia. The group have explained that the idea for the song was inspired by watching the dancing of sardanes in Mataró and feeling that young people should be more involved in the tradition.

== Discography ==
=== Albums ===
- El Pipeig (Luup Records, 2020)
- Èpic Solete (Luup Records, 2023)
- Cafè pels més cafeteros (Luup Records, 2025)

=== EPs ===
- Trapetón (Self-released, 2018)
