= Queralt Lahoz =

Spanish singer (born 1991)

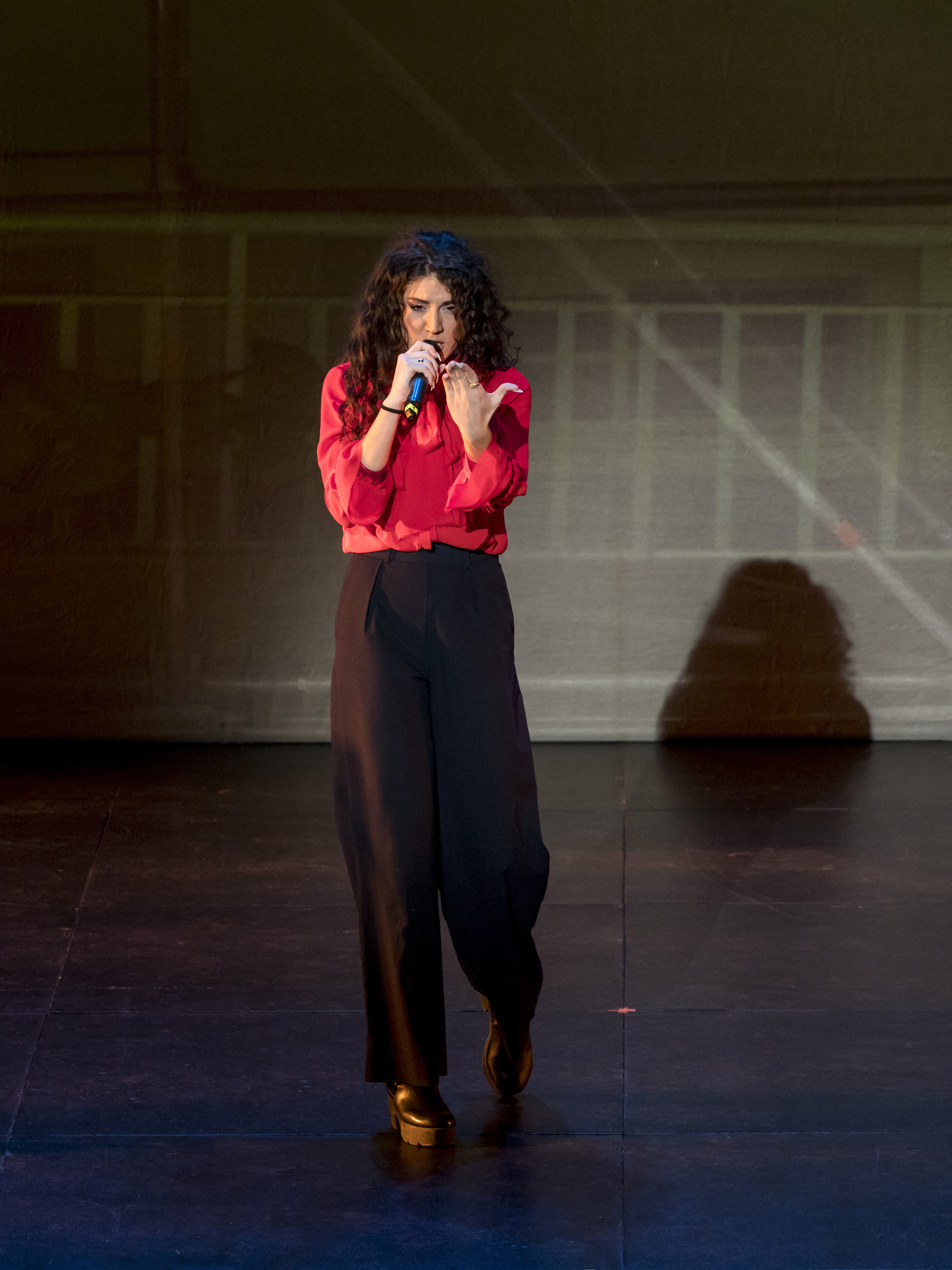

Background information
- Born: 17 November 1991 (age 34); Santa Coloma de Gramenet, Catalonia, Spain
- Genres: Hip hop; flamenco; soul; contemporary R&B; dancehall
- Occupation: Singer

Queralt Lahoz (born 17 November 1991) is a Spanish singer who mixes flamenco tradition and hip-hop music with poetry and social protest.

== Early life ==
Lahoz is the daughter of migrant parents from Guadix; she learned to speak by singing in the ear of her grandmother Maria, who asked her to sing coplas, flamenco and boleros at home, while her mother made her listen to Jimi Hendrix, The Doors and Janis Joplin.

== Career ==
In 2019, Lahoz released her first recording, 1917, a five-song EP dedicated to the women who have been a source of inspiration in her life, giving voice to their stories of courage and overcoming, and which was presented at La Nau in Barcelona, Es Claustre and Mercat de Música Viva de Vic, "exciting with pain and also with celebration". After the release of her first studio album, Pureza (2021), Lahoz went on a tour of more than eighty shows throughout the Iberian Peninsula that continued the following year with international concerts in Europe and the United States. In 2023, she was one of seven winners of the Music Moves Europe Award that honors emerging artists. Later that year she performed at the Gaudí Awards gala with Canción del fuego fatuo, by Manuel de Falla, alongside the Franz Schubert Philharmonia orchestra.

== Musical style ==
Stylistically, Lahoz considers La Niña de los Peines, Gata Cattana, Wu-Tang Clan and Enrique Morente as her main influences.

== Discography ==
=== Studio albums ===
- Pureza (Say It Loud Records, 2021)
- 9:30 PM (Say It Loud Records, 2025)

=== Extended plays ===
- 1917 (EP, Say It Loud Records, 2019)
- Alto Cielo (EP, Say It Loud Records, 2023)
