= Lax'n'Busto =

Catalonian pop-rock group

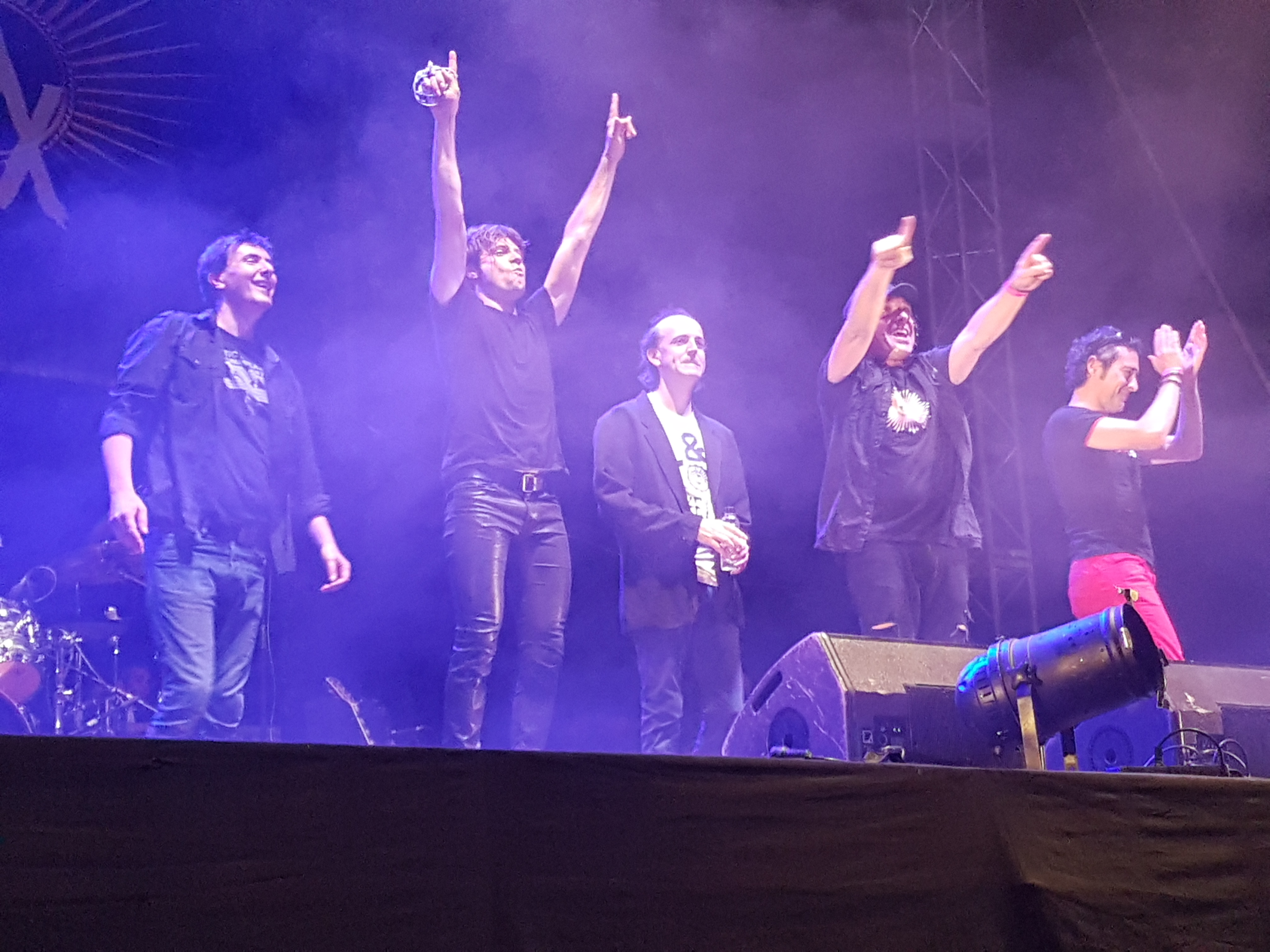
- Lax'n'Busto in concert (Valls, Catalonia) (25 June 2016): from left to right: Jesús Rovira, Salva Racero, Cristian Montenegro, Pemi Rovirosa and Jaume Piñol

Background information
- Origin: El Vendrell, Catalonia, Spain
- Genres: Rock; Pop
- Years active: 1986–present
- Labels: Zebra; DiscMedi; Divucsa; Música Global; LNB Música
- Members: Pemi Rovirosa; Jesús Rovira; Jimmy Piñol; Cristian Gómez Montenegro; Eduard Font
- Past members: Pemi Fortuny; Salva Racero
- Website: laxnbusto.com

Lax'n'Busto are a pop-rock group formed in 1986 in El Vendrell, Catalonia, Spain.

== History ==
In 1989 the group published their first album: Vas de punt?... o què!!! The album was re-released in both in 1992 and 1994, without the song "Carme Flavià!" This song was banned for insulting the titular individual.

Lax'n'Busto released their second album in 1991, including the single "Miami Beach." The following year, they released their third album, Qui ets tu? (Who are you?), which sold 20,000 copies in a few days.

In 1995 the band released their third album, La caixa que puja i baixa. One year later, they recorded this album live under the name A l'auditori. The band also changed managers during this year.

Lax'n'Busto's 1998 album is called Sí. Two years later, they released the album Llença't (Launch yourself). During the same year, they performed more than 50 concerts.

In 2004 they moved their discography archives from DiscMedi to Música Global.

Two years later, Pemi Fortuny Soler left the group, and Salva Racero replaced him as a singer. They recorded their new album, with help from Sylvia Massy, in California.

The album Relax, recorded in the United States and published in 2007, was the eighteenth-most-sold album of the year in Spain, according to the Promusicae ranking, which is the best such performance by a Catalan-language album. The following year, the album Objectiu: La Lluna (Destination: the Moon) was released. This album was recorded in the studios of La Casamurada between the August and September of the same year. Once again, Sylvia Massy produced the album.

In July 2010, they performed at the Teatre Àngel Guimerà in El Vendrell with the Orquestra de Cambra de l'Empordà. 18 songs were recorded live at these concerts, which comprise the tracks on the CD Simfònic.

In 2013, the CD Tot és més senzill was released. These songs have a more personal perspective, and the sound is closer to pop than to rock. The following year, they released Essencials & Rareses where they returned to their rock roots.

Salva Racero left the group in 2016, to focus on a solo career. In 2019 the album Polièdric was released, which featured a variety of singers – including ex-member Pemi Fortuny Soler.

== Discography ==
- 1989: "Vas de punt ...o què!!!"
- 1991: "Lax´N´Busto"
- 1992: "Vas de punt ...o què!!!" without banned song "Carme Flavià".
- 1993: "Qui ets tu?"
- 1995: "La caixa que puja i baixa"
- 1996: "A l'Auditori".
- 1998: "Sí".
- 2000: "Llença’t".
- 2002: Elèctric Tour.
- 2003: "Morfina".
- 2004: "Amb tu Tour".
- 2005: "Amb tu"
- 2006: Last Pemi Fortuny's concert.
- 2006: Lax'n'Busto incorpore the new singer, Salva Racero.
- 2007: "Relax"
- 2008: "Objectiu: La lluna"
- 2009: "A l'Apolo"
- 2013: "Tot és més senzill"
- 2019: "Polièdric"

== Members ==
- Jimmy Piñol Mercader: drums and chorus

Born in Vendrell on 20 July 1971.

- Jesús Rovira Costas: bass and chorus.

Born in Vendrell on 24 May 1968.

- Pemi Rovirosa guitar and chorus.

Born in Vendrell on 5 June 1969.

- Cristian G. Montenegro: guitar.

Born in Vilafranca del Penedès, on 15 October 1970.

- Eduard Font: keyboards.

Born in Torroella de Montgrí on 11 November 1975.
Before this he had been with Sopa de Cabra and Glaucs.

=== Former members ===
- Pemi Fortuny Soler: vocals and guitar.

Born in Vendrell on 16 September de 1965, he left Lax'n'Busto on 20 October 2006.

- Salva Racero Alberch: vocals.

Born in Manresa on 8 August 1976, he was the lead singer in the band from 2006 to 2016.
