= Teràpia de Shock =

Catalan pop-rock band

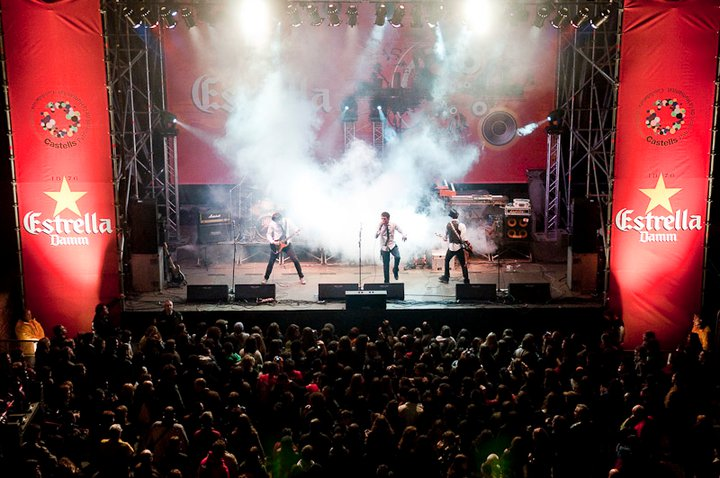
Teràpia de Shock in 2010

Teràpia de shock is a Spanish pop-rock band formed in 2006 by residents of les Preses in Garrotxa. The band's most famous song "Sense Tu" helped their rise to fame after it appeared on the TV3 series Polseres Vermelles.

== History ==
The band was formed in the summer of 2006. Ferran Massegú, who already sang in a band with friends, and Jaume Sucarrats, who played the guitar, met to play some songs together. It was through these sessions, that songs such as Carla and Sense tu began to surface. Gerard López joined the band at the young age of 13. Weeks later, the bassist Albert Parés, from Olot, also joined. Their first performance was at the student festival in Sant Tomàs, at Kratter's nightclub. On the 15th of August, the song Sense Tu was played at a contest in Salitja, where they picked up the award for best group.

=== 2008 ===
In 2008 Escapa't amb mi was released, and the band won the Premi Enderrock for the best new band, which they received for their performance at Sala Bikini in Barcelona.

=== 2010 ===
Two years after the release of their debut album escapa't amb mi, Tota la nit was released, showing their promising pop-rock style and youthful energy. Because of their first album, they already had a large following, mostly made up of adolescents, and a large following on social media.

The album "Tota la nit" contains 13 songs.

=== 2011 ===
During 2011, Sense tu reached over a million views on YouTube, a new record for a Catalan band. This was helped greatly by the popularity of Polseres Vermelles of TV3.
