= Ginestà =

Catalan musical dúo

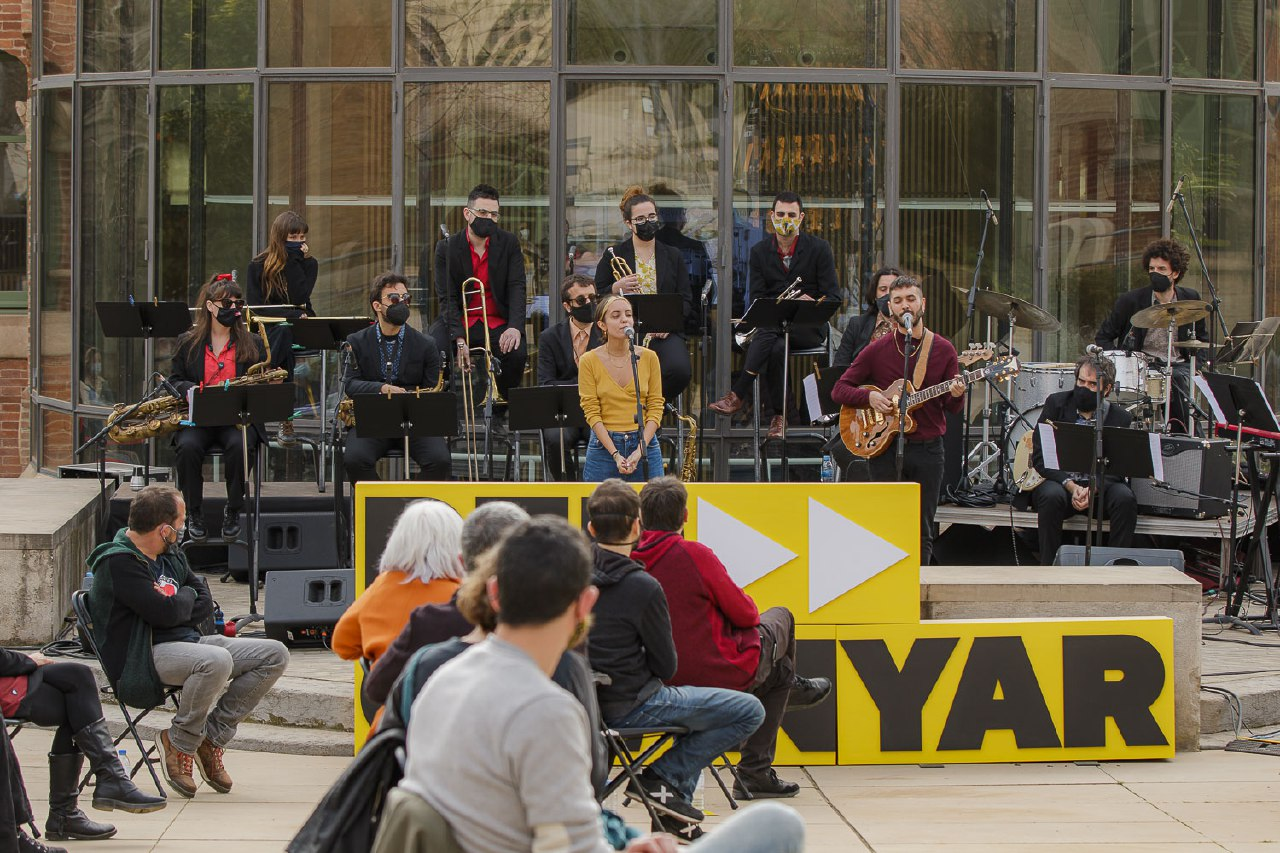

Background information
- Origin: Barcelona, Catalonia, Spain
- Genres: Pop; folk; experimental
- Years active: 2018–present
- Members: Júlia Serrasolsas; Pau Serrasolsas
- Website: ginestamusic.com

Ginestà is a Catalan musical dúo formed based in Barcelona, composed of siblings Júlia and Pau Serrasolsas despite initially being conceived as a quartet. Still independent artists, their musical style consists of a mix of pop, folk and experimental music. Formed in early 2018, the dúo released their debut studio album Neix to commercial failure the same year as its formation. Their following album, Ginestà (2019) received critical acclaim uppon the indie music scene and spawned the single "Estimar-te Com la Terra", which became quite popular in Catalonia. Ginestà has also become notable due to its advocacy for the preservation of the Catalan language.

== Discography ==
=== Studio albums ===
List of studio albums, with selected details and chart positions
| Title | Details |
|---|---|
| Neix | Released: 30 March 2018; Label: Independent; Formats: CD, digital download |
| Ginestà | Released: 15 November 2019; Label: Kasba Music; Formats: CD, digital download |
| Suposo que l'amor és això | Released: 2 April 2022; Label: Kasba Music; Formats: CD, digital download |

=== Singles ===
List of singles as lead artist, with chart positions and certifications, showing year released and album name
| Title | Year | Album |
|---|---|---|
| "Folk Tendre" | 2018 | Neix |
| "Bruixa" | 2018 | Neix |
| "Estimar-te Com la Terra" | 2019 | Ginestà |
| "Kilòmetre 3" | 2019 | Ginestà |
| "Molts Estius Queden Per Viure" | 2020 | Ginestà |
| "L'Eva i la Jana" | 2021 | Suposo que l'amor és això |
"—" denotes a recording that did not chart or was not released in that territory.
