= Manu Guix =

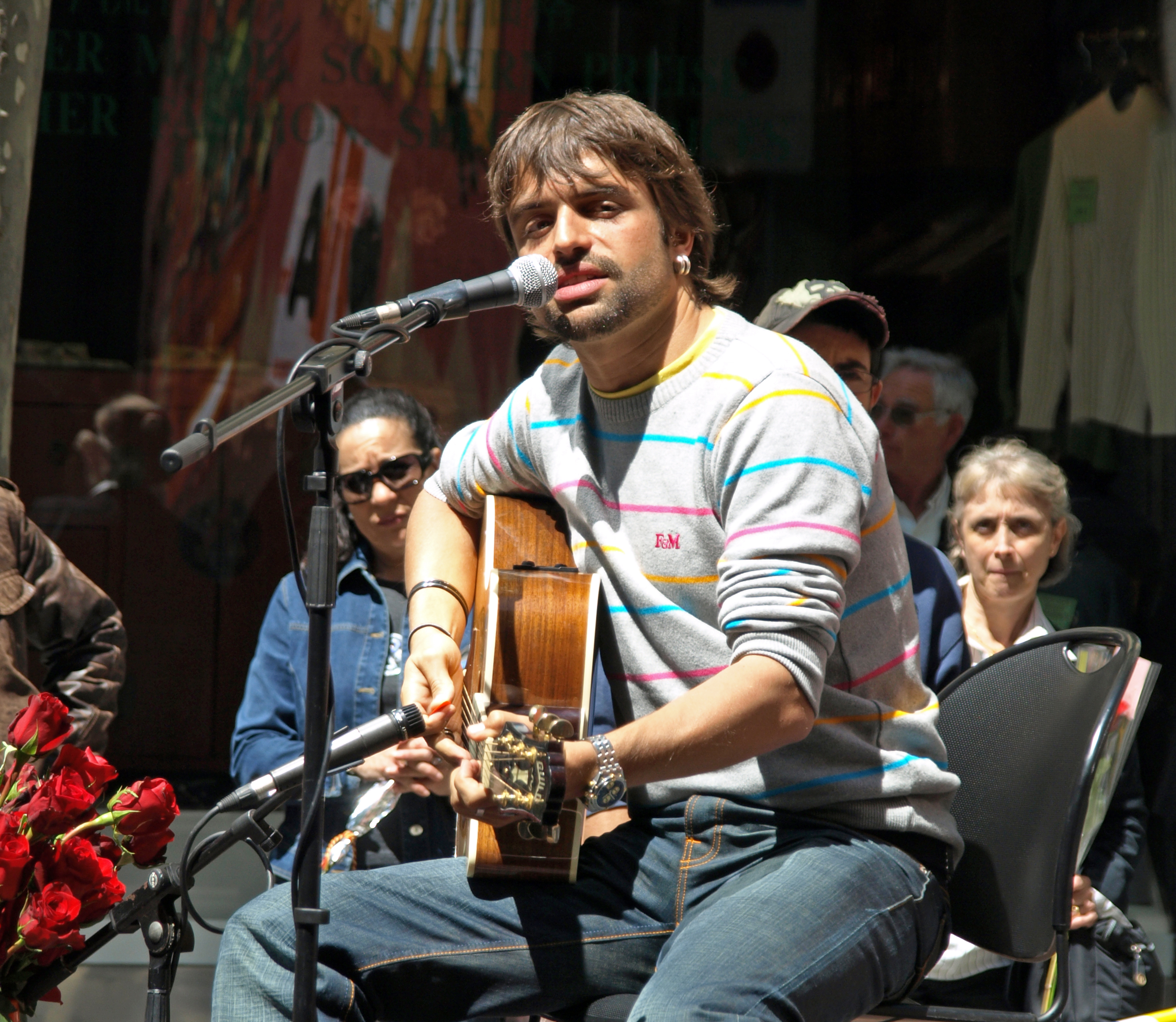
- Born: Manu Guix Tornos; December 8, 1979 (age 46); Barcelona, Spain
- Education: Liverpool Institute for Performing Arts
- Years active: 1987-present

Manu Guix Tornos (Catalan pronunciation: [ˈmanu ˈɣiʃ]; (Note: In isolation, Guix is pronounced [ɡiʃ].) born 8 December 1979, in Barcelona, Spain) is a composer, musical director and Spanish performer. He has been linked to Operación Triunfo since its inception in 2001 and has acted as a coach in every edition of the program. His career began in 1987 at the Municipal Conservatory of Music in Barcelona, and he also studied at the Liverpool Institute for Performing Arts.

He has recorded three works and participated in various musicals as a singer and musical director, including Grease.

Throughout, he has won various awards, including the Award Chair, received in 1997 for "You, Jo, Ell, Ella ... i ... i Schönberg Webber ..." at the revelation of the season show, and the same award granted in 1998 by "The Somni Mozart" as best musical director.

== Awards and recognition ==
- 1990: V Piano Competition Berga City (second prize)
- 1992: 25 º Concours of Young Pianist of Catalonia, in Vilafranca Penedès (second prize)
- 1997: Chair Award for the show "Yo, ho, ell, ella ... i ... i Schönberg Webber ..." the revelation of the season show
- 1998: Chair Award for the show "El somni de Mozart" as best musical director
- 1999: Scholarship from the Generalitat of Catalonia to study music abroad
- 2008: Nominated for the Max Awards (twelfth edition) by the musical direction of Grease, the musical of your life
- 2009: Nominated for Gran Via Musical Theater for the musical direction of Grease, the musical of your life
- 2009: Chair Award for the show What! The Nou Musical as best musical composition

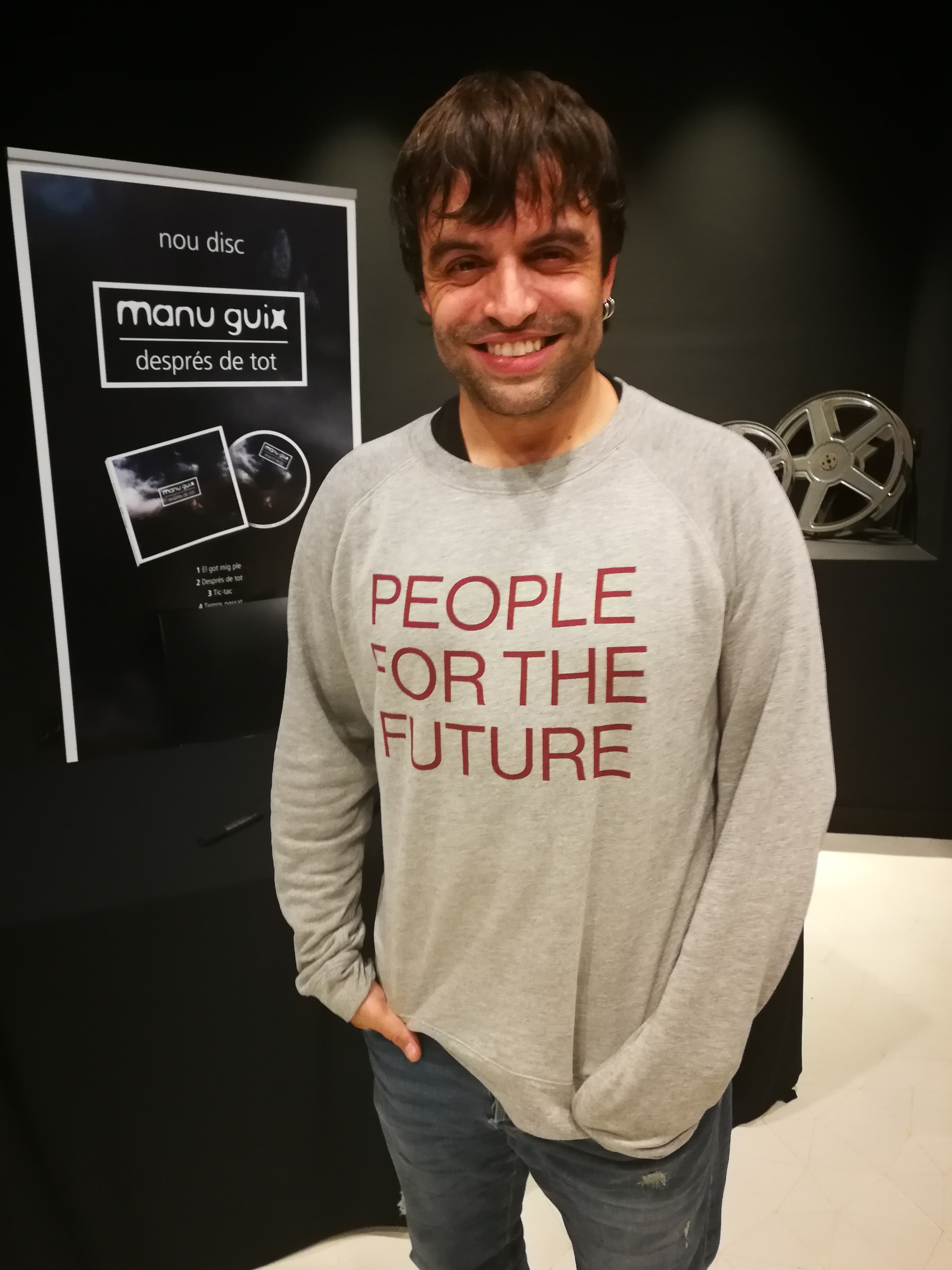
Manu Guix in the presentation of him album Després de tot in the Auditori Valentí Fuster de Cardona
