= Doctor Prats =

Music group from Catalonia, Spain

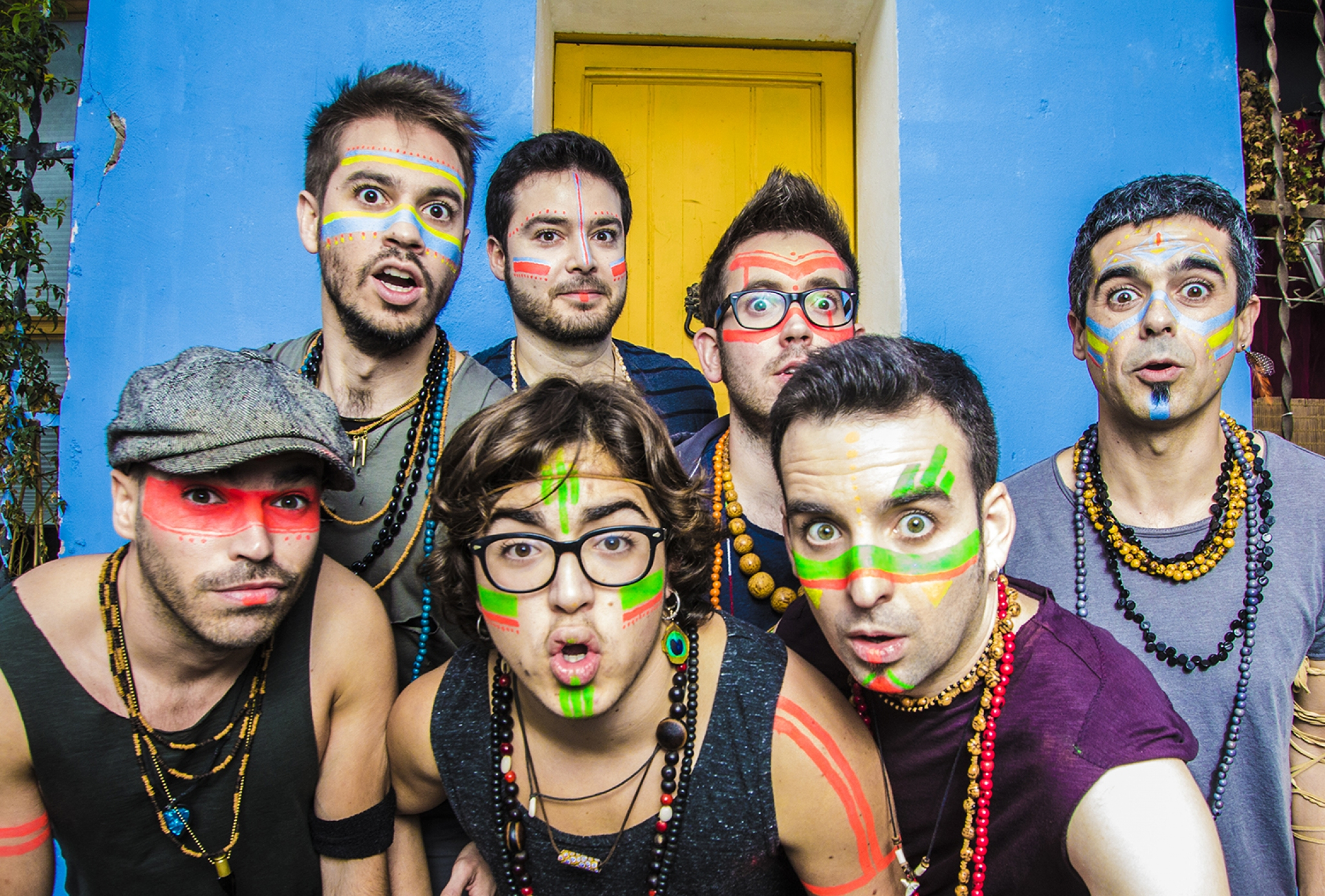
- Doctor prats

Background information
- Origin: Terrassa, Catalunya, Spain
- Genres: Ska, reggae, funk, electronic music
- Years active: 2014–present
- Members: Ramon Figueras (horn): Miki Santamaria (bass); Victor Martínez (keyboard); Josep Jaume Rey (electric guitar); Oriol Cors (percussion)
- Website: doctorprats.cat

Doctor Prats is a band from Terrassa in Catalonia, Spain that was formed in 2015.

== History ==
Doctor Prats was created in 2015, with the intent to be solely an online band. The same year, they released their first album, Patates amb peix (Potatoes with fish). On Saturday, April 11, they performed their first concert in the Faktoria d'Arts in Terrassa, in collaboration with various local artists.

In April 2016, just a year after the first album was released, a second single, called Aham Sigah, was released. They performed the new work at the Bikini Room in Barcelona. Thereafter, they toured Catalonia, performing at venues such as Clownia, the Acampada Jove, or the Barcelona annual festival La Mercè.

They began performing abroad in 2017, with concerts in France, Hungary, and Japan. They continued performing on tour in Catalonia, filling venues such as the Canet Rock Festival, the Acampada Jove, or the BioRitme Festival, among many others. On October 4, the two-year tour came to a close with a concert in the Apollo Room (Barcelona), but the political events surrounding the 2017 Catalan independence referendum at the time caused it to be canceled. The tour ended October 30 at the Sant Narcís fairs in Girona.

== Discography ==
- 2015: Patates amb peix (self-published)
- 2016: Aham Sigah (Música Global)
- 2018: Venim de lluny
- 2022: Pel Cantó Bo
- 2023: Pau Bela (Basquetbolista profesional)
- 2025: F5

== See also ==
- Buhos
- Music of Catalonia
- Catalan rumba
- World music
