= Els Catarres =

Catalan pop-folk band

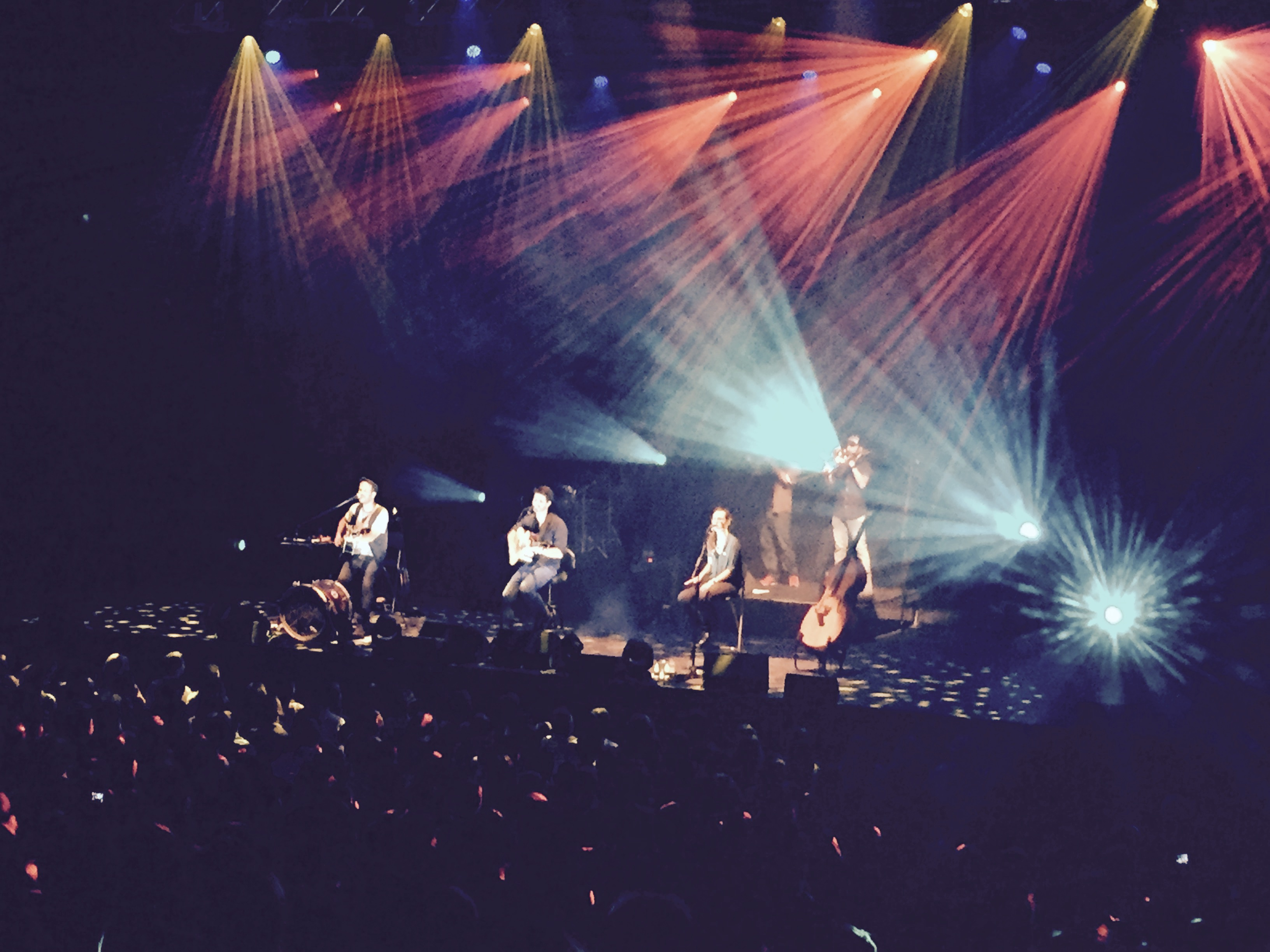

Background information
- Origin: Aiguafreda and Centelles, Catalonia, Spain
- Genres: Pop-folk
- Years active: 2010–present
- Labels: Discmedi Blau
- Members: Èric Vergés; Jan Riera Prats; Roser Cruells
- Website: Els Catarres

Els Catarres are a Catalan pop-folk band. The members of Els Catarres are Èric Vergés and Jan Riera Prats from Aiguafreda and Roser Cruells from Centelles. The band is famous for the song Jenifer that became a hit in the summer of 2011 in Catalan Countries.

The band formed towards the end of 2010, starting with small gigs in bars and at la Fira d'Artesania d'Aiguafreda.

Their first EP was released and made available online. Due to the popularity of their song "Jenifer", about a prohibited love between a patriotic Catalan man and a "xoni" from Castefa, they rose to fame in 2011. The word xoni is a slang term that in this context refers to young people in Spain, and therefore in Catalunya too, who are less culturally educated. By June 2011 the music video for "Jenifer" had received 200,000 views and by mid-September it reached 800,000. By the beginning of October it had reached over a million views and many covers were created of the song. By the summer of 2011, they had over 100 concerts planned around Catalunya. The band only released their music on CD, under the condition that it continued to be available online for free.

On 29 November 2011 their first album was released for general sale, Cançons 2011, consisting of 13 songs, four of which completely unedited. Under the company Discmedi Blau, the album was released in shops, though also available for free online. The first unedited song to be released was "Me'n vaig al camp", a parody of a "modernet" from Barcelona that decides to go and live in the countryside. The disc sold over 5,000 copies.

In March 2012 Els Catarres were awarded the "Enderrock 2012" prize for best lyrics, for the song "Jenifer".
