= Enderrock =

Catalan music magazine

- Director: Lluís Gendrau
- Frequency: Monthly
- Founded: 1993
- Company: Grup Enderrock
- Country: Spain
- Based in: Barcelona
- Language: Catalan
- Website: http://www.enderrock.cat
- ISSN: 1136-7393

Enderrock is a monthly musical magazine published in Catalan, since 1993. It specializes in the promotion of pop-rock music in the Catalan language and around Catalan speaking areas.

In 2004 it was awarded with a National Award for the social promotion of Catalan language by Government of Catalonia. Since 2001, Enderrock also organizes Sona 9 musical talent contest and the Enderrock awards. Magazine is published by Grup Enderrock, led by Lluís Gendrau. They also publish 440Clàssica.

The magazine's name is a play on words because "enderroc" can mean "demolition" or "overthrow" in Catalan, similar to how rock music can be seen as disruptive.
