= Concert for Freedom =

2013 concert in Barcelona, Spain

Concert for Freedom Concert per la Llibertat
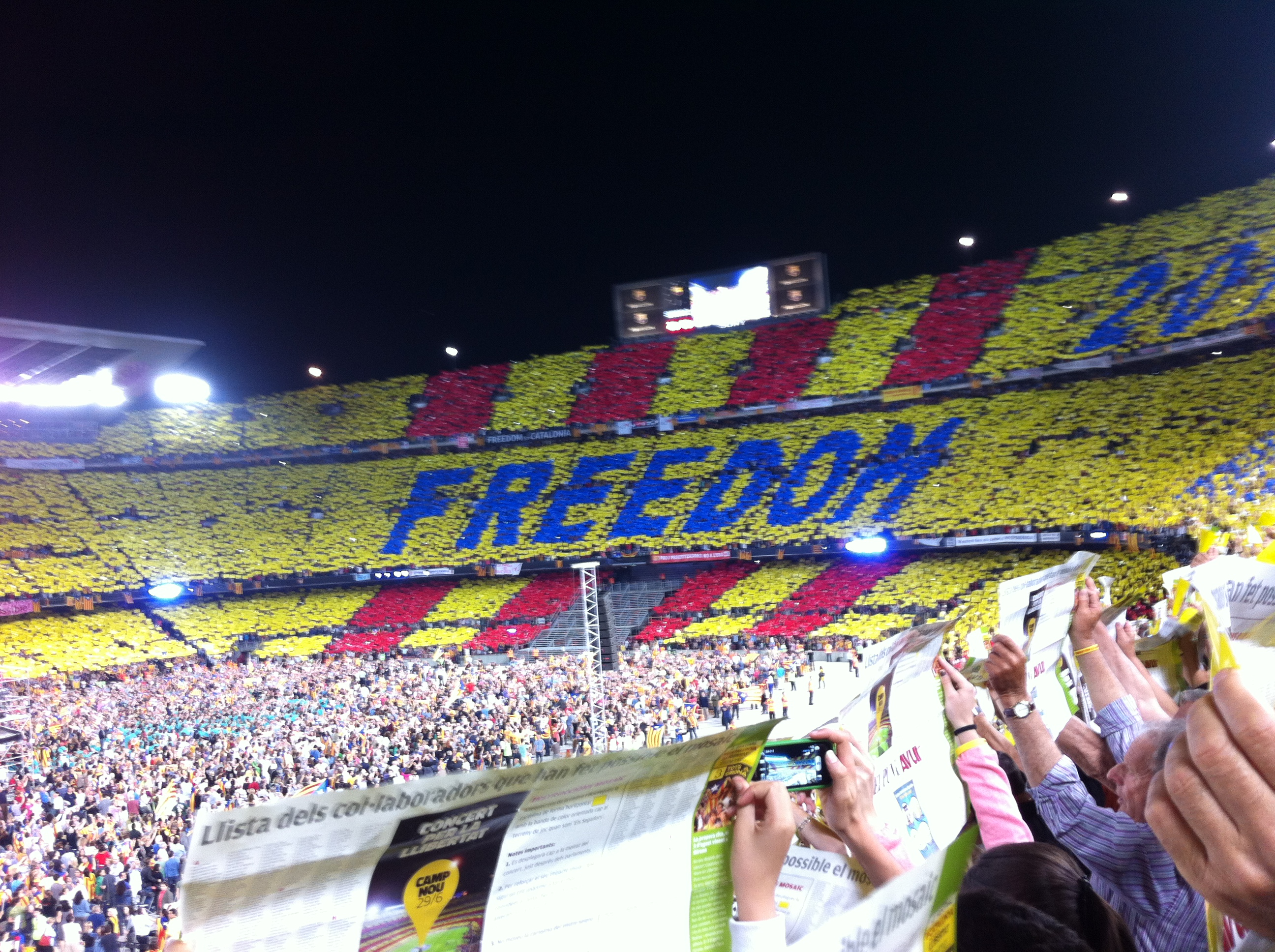
- Mosaic at the Concert for Freedom
- Genre: Concert in support of Self-determination; Catalan independence
- Date: 29 June 2013 (20:00h)
- Venue: Camp Nou
- Location: Barcelona
- Next event: 2014: Nosaltres decidim Freedom Catalonia 2014
- Participants: Òmnium Cultural and Assemblea Nacional Catalana
- Attendance: 90,000 people
- Website: www.concertperlallibertat.cat

The Concert for Freedom was a concert held at Camp Nou football stadium in Barcelona on 29 June 2013, organized by Òmnium Cultural in conjunction with other civil society organization such as the Assemblea Nacional Catalana and the Plataforma Pro Seleccions Esportives Catalanes with the goal using the universal language of music to demand the right of Catalonia and other nations of the world to freely and democratically decide their future. Some 90,000 people were in attendance. Between the 2012 Catalan independence demonstration and the Catalan Way, the concert was another social mobilization event in favor of independence. More than 400 artists performed, among them Lluís Llach, Sopa de Cabra, Miquel Gil, Pastora, Joana Serrat, Jofre Bardagí, Jordi Batiste, Lídia Pujol, Maria del Mar Bonet, Marina Rossell, Mercedes Peón, Nena Venetsanou, Orfeó Català, Paco Ibáñez, Pascal Comelade, Pau Alabajos, Pep Sala, Peret, Projecte Mut, Sabor de Gràcia, Ferran Piqué, Joan Enric Barceló & Eduard Costa from Els Amics de les Arts, and Brams. The artistic directors were Gerard Quintana and Lluís Danés, who was in charge of set design. The stage featured various steps symbolizing the path toward freedom.

Also present at Camp Nou were nine members of the Catalan government and representatives from the majority of Catalan political parties that support Catalonia's right to self-determination. Muriel Casals, the president of Òmnium Cultural, gave a speech affirming that "Catalonia's independence movement is not against anyone or anything" and requesting that politicians not delay the process toward a referendum.

== Background ==
Concert tickets went on sale on Monday, 3 June and almost all (60,000) were sold the same day, with online wait times to purchase tickets that exceeded six hours. This caused the organization to initially freeze ticket sales and then release 30,000 tickets for sale on the 17th, though these were for seats at the south goal post of the stadium, behind the stage.

When the singer Dyango announced his participation in the Concert for Freedom, some Spaniards were outraged. Dyango was not intimidated by the attitudes of the hosts on 13 TV, an ecclesiastic television channel that is one of the stalwarts of Spanish nationalism, in the face of his support for separatism. He affirmed that the current goal is to hold a Catalan referendum, and ultimately achieve full separation from Spain. Peret also denounced pressure and threats he has received for participating in the concert.

Singer-songwriter from the Canary Islands, Pedro Guerra, cancelled his participation in the concert alleging that the event had veered toward "purely separatist motivations that he doesn't share" and that "this is not his fight," while affirming that he was not pressured into withdrawing. Singer Mayte Martín also withdrew at the last minute for similar motives.

== Program ==
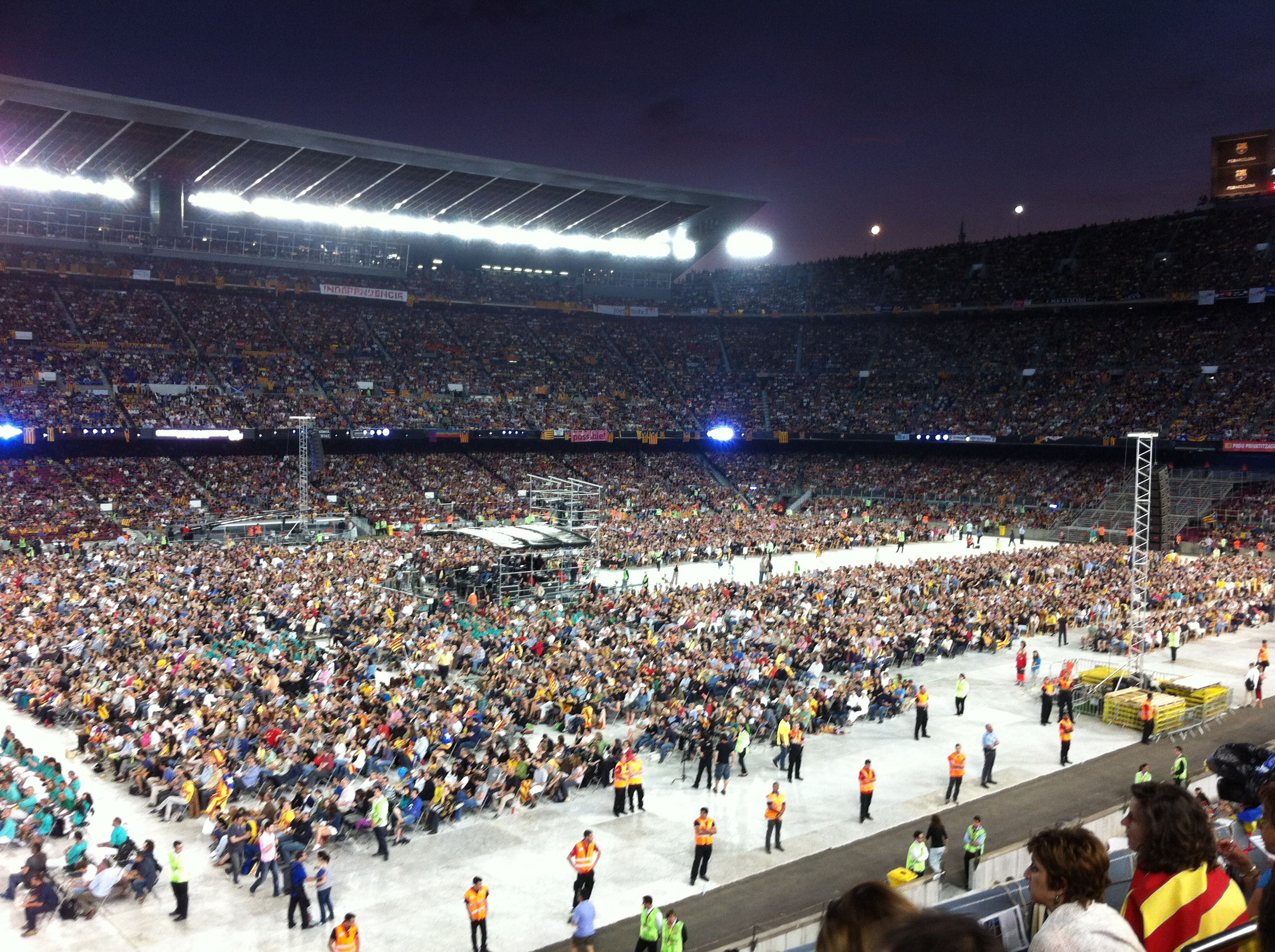
Partial view of Camp Nou during the concert.

Before the concert an information fair was set up outside Camp Nou and the local Food Bank established collection points to benefit the needy, collecting a total of 25 tons of food.

The event was divided in two halves. In the first half, various artists interpreted songs related to freedom and popular Catalan tunes such as "L'emigrant" (The Emigrant) sung by Peret; "Què volen aquesta gent?" (What do these people want?) sung by María del Mar Bonet and Companyia Elèctrica Dharma, and "Camins" (Paths) sung by Sopa de Cabra. The second half featured songs by Lluís Llach sung both by the artist himself and other artists such as Orfeó Català, Perros, Ramoncín, Pastora and Miquel Gil, in homage to Llach's concert at Camp Nou in 1985, remembered as a protest in supports of the rights of the Catalan nation. At halftime, the Castellers de Vilafranca orchestrated a 9 level high human tower called a 3 de 9 amb folre and they played the Catalan national anthem "Els segadors," while forming a giant mosaic reading "Freedom Catalonia 2014."

During the first half, readings were performed between songs by Cristina Plazas, Anna Sahun, Bonaventura Clotet, Manel Esteller, Miquel Casas, Pere Joan Cardona, Alícia Casals, Isona Passola, Ventura Pons, Joel Joan, Jordi Díaz, Josep Pedrals, Lluís Soler, Màrius Serra, Matthew Tree, Montserrat Carulla, Núria Feliu, Quim Masferrer, Roger Coma and Sílvia Bel.

Readings were written by Bertolt Brecht, Dolors Miquel, Enric Casasses, Jacint Verdaguer (La veu del Montseny), Joan Margarit, Joana Raspall (El vell vestit), Maria Àngels Anglada, Marià Villangómez, Miquel Martí i Pol, Montserrat Abelló, Salvador Espriu (El meu poble i jo), Vicent Andrés Estellés, Joan Brossa, Josep Maria de Sagarra (La campana de Sant Honorat).

Performers	Piece
First half
Cobla de Cambra de Catalunya	Juny
Cobla de Cambra, Pascal Comelade and Enric Casasses	Sense el ressò del dring
Pere Jou, Andreu Rifé, Joan Dausà and Jofre Bardagí	Qualsevol nit pot sortir el sol
Grup de Folk (Eduard Estivill, Jaume Arnella, Oriol Tramvia, Jordi Pujol and Isidor Marí)	Vull ser lliure
Sabor de Gràcia	Ningú no comprèn ningú
Projecte Mut	Jo tenc una enamorada
Pep Sala and Dyango	Boig per tu
Peret	L'emigrant / Ella té molt poder
Joan Isaac and Joan Amèric	A Margalida
Yacine Belahcene and Yannis Papaioannou	La mala reputació
Paco Ibáñez	Como tú
Mercedes Peón	Ben linda
Joana Serrat and Xavier Baró	Aquesta terra
Jordi Batiste and Meritxell Gené	Escolta-ho en el vent
Sopa de Cabra	Camins
Theo	Catalonia (Louisiana)
Fermin Muguruza	Gora Herria
Pau Alabajos and Cesk Freixas	Al vent
Brams	Vull per demà
Maria del Mar Bonet and Companyia Elèctrica Dharma	Què volen aquesta gent?
Companyia Elèctrica Dharma i Cobla de Cambra de Catalunya	La presó del rei de França
Carles Santos and Cobla per la Independència	Fanfàrria
Speech by Muriel Casals
Orfeó Català, Cobla de Cambra de Catalunya and the audience	Els Segadors
Castellers de Vilafranca	human tower "3 de 9 amb folre"
Second half
Lluís Llach	Venim del nord, venim del sud
Pastora	Tinc un clavell per a tu
Gwen Perry and Gisele Jackson	Que tinguem sort
Gossos	Bressol de tots els blaus
Lluís Llach	Un núvol blanc
Lídia Pujol	País petit
Miquel Gil	El jorn dels miserables
Franca Masu	Maremar
Nena Venetsanou	Vaixell de Grècia
Marina Rossell	Que feliç era, mare
Alessio Lega	Abril 74
David Alegret	Amor particular
Orfeó Català	Campanades a morts
Joan Isaac, Ferran Piqué, Joan Enric Barceló, Eduard Costa, Pere Jou, Andreu Rifé, Joan Dausà, Jofre Bardagí, Xavier Baró, Enric Hernàez, Orfeó Català	No és això, companys, no és això
Gerard Quintana and Pascal Comelade	I si canto trist
Cris Juanico	Viatge a Ítaca I
Gorka Knörr	Viatge a Ítaca II
Mercedes Peón	Com un arbre nu
Beth, Ivette Nadal i Bikimel	Laura
Maria del Mar Bonet	Alè
Manel Camp, Nabil Mansour, Masil, Yacine Belahcene, Ismael, Ramoncín i Cor per la Integració	L'estaca
Everyone	Tossudament alçats

== International reception ==
The Concert for Freedom was covered by several international media agencies (such as Reuters and The Associated Press) and various newspapers, television and radio stations from France, Germany, Italy, Poland, the Netherlands, Portugal, etc. One of the most talked-about images from the event by the media was the mosaic that unfolded in the stands during the playing of the national anthem of Catalonia.

Among the articles covering the event were:

- Le Figaro (France): Un stade sang et or pour l'indépendace de la Catalogne (Blood- and Gold-Colored Stadium for Catalan Independence)
- L'Indépendant (France): Grand concert pour l'indépendance catalane ce samedi soir au Camp Nou avec Lluis Llach (Huge Concert for Catalan Independence Saturday at Camp Nou with Lluís Llach)
- Wiener Zeitung (Austria): 90.000 fordern bei "Konzert für Freiheit" Unabhängigkeit Kataloniens (90,000 Call for Catalan Independence at Concert for Freedom)
- DS De Standaard (Flanders): 90.000 mensen op concert voor onafhankelijkheid Catalonië (90,000 People at Concert for Catalan Independence)
- RTBF Info (Wallonia): Quelque 90 000 personnes au “Concert pour la Paix” pour indépendance de la Catalogne (Some 90,000 People at "Concert for Peace" for Catalan Independence)
- Stol (South Tyrol): 90 000 fordern bei „Konzert für Freiheit“ Unabhängigkeit Kataloniens (90,000 Call for Catalan Independence at "Concert for Freedom")
- Zürcher Unterländer (Switzerland): 90 000 fordern bei „Konzert für Freiheit“ Unabhängigkeit Kataloniens (90,000 Call for Catalan Independence at "Concert for Freedom")
- Neue Luzerner Neitung (Switzerland): Katalonen fordern Unabhängigkei (Catalans Demand Independence)
- 7seizh.info (Britain): Barcelone : 90 000 personnes au « concert pour la liberté » de la Catalogne (Barcelona: 90,000 People at Concert for "Catalan Freedom")
- RTP Noticias (Portugal) - Catalães celebram luta pela independência da Catalunha (Catalans Celebrate Fight for Catalan Independence)
- Enikos (Greece): ”Πλημμύρισαν” το Καμπ Νου (Camp Nou, Filled to the Brim)
- Tanea (Greece): Συναυλία για την Ελευθερία της Καταλωνίας (Concert for Catalan Freedom)
- 24Sports (Cypress): «Πλημμύρισε» το Καμπ Νου για την ανεξαρτησία της Καταλονίας (Camp Nou: Full to the Brim for Catalan Independence)
- BBC Amèrica Latina: Multitudinario concierto por la independencia de Cataluña (Massive Concert for Catalan Independence)
