= Barony of La Llacuna =

Barony of La Llacuna Baronia de la Llacuna
- Barony of Crown of Aragon
- 1325–1831
- Coat of arms
- Capital: La Llacuna
- Government
- Baron
  - 1325: Guillem IV de Cervelló
  - 1454: Arnau Guillem de Cervelló
  - 16th century: Joana de Castre-Pinós (through marriage)
- Historical era: Middle Ages
  - Grant of merum imperium to Guillem IV de Cervelló: 1325
  - Abolished feudal jurisdiction: 1831
- Today part of: La Llacuna, Santa Maria de Miralles (Anoia), Pontils (Conca de Barberà)

The Barony of La Llacuna was a barony belonging to the Cervelló lineage, lords of Vilademàger, Anoia, Catalonia, Spain, who used this denomination around 1347. The barony comprised the present-day territories of La Llacuna, Santa Maria de Miralles (Anoia) and Pontils (Conca de Barberà), within which are included Rocamora and Santa Perpètua de Gaià. The current territories of these have an extension of approximately 145 km^{2}, but the lordship must have been somewhat smaller, since Vallespinosa, within the current municipality of Pontils, must be excluded, which implies leaving isolated Selmella (now within the municipality of Pont d'Armentera), which also belonged to the seigneury of the Cervelló.

From east to west, the seigneury extended between the small hill where the church of Sant Pere de Vilademàger stands, near the remains of the castle, and the Montclar hill, where the ruins of the old fortress and the Romanesque chapel of Sant Miquel are preserved, which was probably the church of the castle. Both places marked the east–west boundaries of the old seigneury.

== History ==
The Barony began to take shape at the end of the reign of James II, in 1325, which marks the starting point of the barony when King James granted Guillem (IV) de Cervelló the merum imperium over Vilademàger-Pontils, while recognizing that these castles were already in the possession of the Cervelló as royal fiefs. The foundational privilege was ratified by John I in 1387 in favor of Guerau (VIII) de Cervelló, grandson of the first grantee. Guerau had been imprisoned by the forces of the Infante of Spain James IV of Majorca at the time of the invasion —or attempted invasion, from Roussillon— of the Principality (1374). To pay his ransom, the king pawned in favor of said nobleman the jurisdiction, both merum and mixtum imperium, of his castles of Selmella, Rocamora, Foix and Santa Perpètua. This list of castles must be added, therefore, to the merum imperium that he already held over those of Vilademàger-Pontils, thus completing the jurisdictional scope that the future barony would end up having.

In 1397, the places of the barony, then in the hands of Elisenda de Queralt, widow of Guillem Ramon II, were the following:

- Vilademàger-La Llacuna.
- Miralles.
- Pontils.
- Rocamora.
- Santa Perpètua.
- Selmella.

It should be noted, however, that while the castles of Miralles, Rocamora and Selmella were allodial property of the Cervelló, those of Vilademàger, Pontils and that of Santa Perpètua were held as a fief of the king. The lordship of the castle of Santa Perpètua was disputed between the Cervelló branch of Santa Perpètua and Vallespinosa (originated by the illegitimate son —borda— of Guerau VII de Cervelló) and the Vilademàger-Pontils branch, although in the 1380s Santa Perpètua came to depend solely on the Barons of Vilademàger.

In 1454, Arnau Guillem de Cervelló donated the barony, still entitled of Vilademàger, to his emancipated son Berenguer Arnau (III). The donation included the following localities: the town of La Llacuna, as well as the castles and places of Miralles, Pontils, Rocamora, Santa Perpètua and Selmella; in addition, it also transferred the places of Miralcamp, Bellfort and Vilaplana (diocese of Lleida), of which he was also lord. However, the transfer did not take place until after the death of Arnau Guillem (which occurred after 1478).

Until then, the castle of Vilademàger had been the center of their domains. In the 15th century the Cervelló moved their residence near La Llacuna, in the so-called castle or house of Pujol. La Llacuna thus became the center of the barony (in the census of 1496–1497, the Baron of La Llacuna is recorded as registered in La Llacuna).

La Llacuna originated in a settlement separate from the castle of Vilademàger, around an ecclesiastical establishment or priory, to which a hospital was attached, founded in 1325, which soon had annexed the church of Santa Maria de Nazareth that occupied part of the site where the current parish church now stands. Through La Llacuna the commercial activity of the barony was channeled, first through the obtaining of a weekly market in 1319, and later (1335) through the obtaining of an annual fair. By the end of the 15th century La Llacuna had already taken all the prominence from the old territory of Vilademàger. The lords moved their residence there, hence it was more appropriate to refer to them as barons of La Llacuna rather than of Vilademàger.

In the 16th century, the Cervelló changed their name to those of Castre and Pinós following the marriage of Berenguer Arnau (III) with Joana de Castre-Pinós. At the end of that century, the barony passed to the Alagó, barons of Alfajarín, and later to the Montcada, marquises of Aitona, and to the Fernández de Córdoba, dukes of Medinaceli. In 1831 the jurisdiction was shared between the Marquess of Aitona (Duke of Medinaceli) and the Marquess of Moja.

== See also ==
- Spain in the Middle Ages
- Crown of Aragon
- History of Catalonia
- Feudalism
