= Obeses =

Catalan pop-rock band

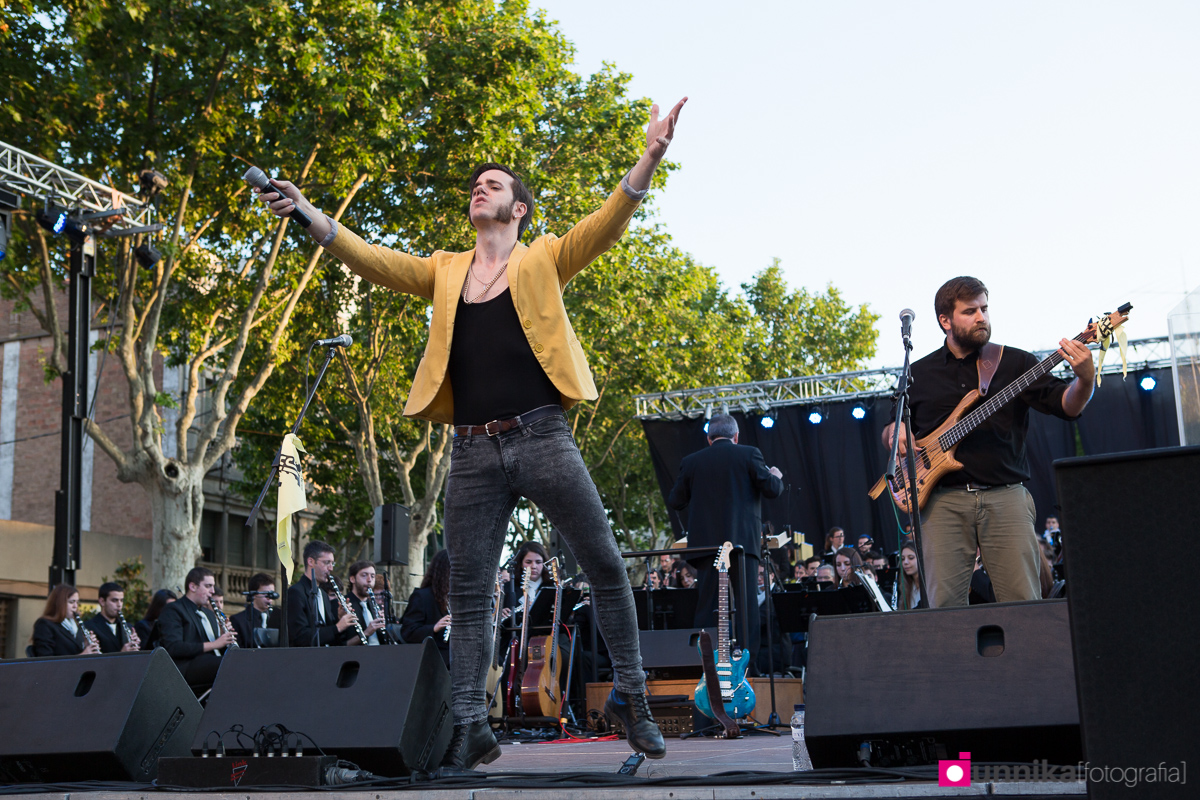
- Obeses performing in Badalona (2016)

Background information
- Origin: Tona, Catalonia
- Genres: Pop rock, rock opera
- Years active: 2010–present
- Label: Música Global
- Members: Arnau Tordera i Prat; Jaume Coll Mariné
- Website: www.obeses.cat

Obeses is a Catalan pop-rock band formed in 2010 in the town of Tona, in the Osona region of Catalonia.They released their first album, Obesisme Il·lustrat, in 2011. Later, they released Zel (2013), Monstres i Princeses (2015), Fills de les estrelles (2018), and Ai al Cor (2024). In 2013, they premiered a musical version of Salvador Espriu's poem El meu poble i jo to commemorate the centenary of the poet's birth.

== History ==
The band was formed in 2010 in Tona, with members from the Osona-based group Segle XIII, aiming to achieve creative freedom that would enable musical experiences and sonic journeys contributing to the listener's personal growth through the enjoyment of sound. They performed their first concert in Manlleu on 18 June 2010, alongside Anna Roig i L'ombre de ton chien and Mishima.

=== Obesisme Il·lustrat (2011) ===
The band's first album was presented on 25 February 2011 at the Sala Pasternak in Vic. This release puzzled critics, who struggled to define its style or grasp its essence. Nevertheless, renowned musicians such as composer Albert Guinovart, Miquel Abras, and Núria Feliu praised its content, and a large audience, disillusioned with the music offered by previous local bands, rallied behind the group. The promotional tour concluded at La Mirona venue in Salt on 16 November 2012.

=== Zel (2013) ===
On 22 February 2013, at the L'Atlàntida Theatre in Vic, the band presented their second album to overwhelming success. The program for that evening stated:

Is it possible to listen to a sardana, a symphonic work, a choral fugue, Rock & Roll, a havanera, and Gypsy Jazz all on the same album? Indeed, it is not possible. And that is precisely why Obeses has done it: because their musical feat operates in the realm of making the impossible possible. Any art that has already been made possible loses the value of creative allure and, ultimately, what constitutes it—its essence. Thus, only by following inscrutable paths can unattainable peaks be reached. Obeses walks along these paths.

This second album release sparked a strong confrontation within the Catalan specialized music criticism scene. While some hailed Obeses as unparalleled geniuses, others continued to regard their work as an oddity. One of the most celebrated comments came from Empar Moliner in the newspaper Ara:

"Obeses are one of the most original, ambitious, and talented bands in our country. They have very little to do with what others are doing. Trust me and listen to them. I’m not wrong."

— Empar Moliner in Ara.

Other prominent figures in Catalan culture, such as Jair Domínguez, Lluís Gavaldà, Valero Sanmartí, and Cesk Freixas, expressed their admiration for the quartet from Osona. This growing acceptance and recognition became evident throughout the promotional tour for their second album (culminating with a concert at the Teatre Àtrium in Viladecans), with an enthusiastic audience that grew with each performance.

=== Monstres i Princeses (2015) ===
After two years of work, on 18 March 2015 the band released a video teaser with small fragments of what would become the album, which was finally published on 21 April. On 21 May of the same year, Obeses presented the album live at the Auditori de Barcelona in a joint concert with the Banda Municipal de Barcelona, under the title Obeses 3D. The recital was nearly cancelled due to a strike by the venue's ushers. During the tour, titled Gira Llegendària, the band collaborated with other orchestras, such as the orchestra of the Teatre Conservatori de Manresa or the Banda EMVIC (Escola de Música i Conservatori de Vic). In some of the concerts of the tour, the Obeses Choir also participated. In August 2015, Obeses gathered their fans at the Castle of Tona to record the video clip of their song "Ens hem alçat". The result was released on social media on 11 February 2016. A few months later, they released the video clip for the song "Brindem, brindem".

The tour concluded on 8 October 2016 at the Teatre Nacional de Catalunya with a large-scale production lasting more than two hours, which the band titled Museu Obeses. The event featured the collaboration of comedian Peyu as presenter.

=== Verdaguer: Ombres i Maduixes (2017) ===
This rock opera premiered on 16 and 17 December 2016 at the Atlàntida Theatre in Vic, on the occasion of the closing of Vic's Catalan capital of culture year (VICCC2016). The show was a musical tribute to the life and work of Jacint Verdaguer, with a libretto based on his poems and music composed by Arnau Tordera. The opera was performed live by the members of the band, except for Tordera, who also acted on stage. In 2017, the production was staged again at the Romea Theatre in Barcelona between 1 and 5 March, and later that year in Girona and Torelló. On 22 May 2017, the full double CD recording of Verdaguer: Ombres i Maduixes was released.

=== Fills de les Estrelles (2018) ===
On 13 March 2018, Obeses announced the title and release date of their fifth album, Fills de les estrelles, on social media. On 28 March, they presented the single "Ens en sortirem", a hymn dedicated to the events of 1 October 2017 in Catalonia. Subsequently, the band released the rest of the tracks individually on their social media platforms, and the full album was published on 13 April 2018.

The band presented the album for the first time on 20 April 2018 at Sala BARTS as part of the Guitar Festival BCN, kicking off the Gira Estel·lar tour. The closing concert was scheduled for 28 November 2020 at the Teatre Condal, but was ultimately replaced by the online premiere of the videoclip for "Invasió Terrícola". On 14 September 2020, Obeses released the video for "Es compten les pigues". Due to restrictions caused by the COVID-19 pandemic, the band offered a unique online concert titled Obeses al taller to raise funds for the group's maintenance. It premiered on the band's YouTube channel on 26 December 2020.

=== L'Ai al cor (2024) ===
In 2022, Obeses announced the project and tour l'Ai al cor, which was initially intended to premiere new original songs as the tour progressed. Eventually, the band postponed the release of new material despite continuing the tour. At the end of 2023, the release date for the group's sixth album was announced, with the premiere concert held on 29 June 2024 at Paral·lel 62 in Barcelona. On 25 April 2024, six years after their previous album release, they published the videoclip for the new single Amor artificial. On 11 June 2024, Obeses announced the publication of the first part of l'Ai al cor, titled Sístole, on their social media accounts. Between 16 and 20 June 2024, the band released the songs individually, and finally on 21 June the full album was shared. The second part of the album, titled Diàstole, will be released once audiences have sufficiently enjoyed the first part, according to Arnau Tordera. On 9 May 2025, the group celebrated their 15th anniversary with a concert at the Atlàntida Theatre in Vic, where they performed in full their first two albums, Obesisme Il·lustrat and Zel.

=== Other projects and collaborations ===
Throughout their career, the musical group has taken part in various projects and collaborations. On 10 September 2016, Obeses performed «Venim del nord, venim del sud» by Lluis Llach as part of the events for the National Day of Catalonia at the CC El Born.

==== Corporació Catalana de Mitjans Audiovisuals ====
They were the authors of the 2013 Christmas song for TV3, «Regala Petons». In December 2016, as part of the 25th anniversary concert of the Club Super3, Arnau Tordera performed the theme of the animated series Dragon Ball Z. The group has collaborated on several occasions with La Marató de TV3. Among other songs, they performed «Ja comencem» (a version of «So, may we start») with The Feliuettes, «Ara per fi hi veig clar» with Geriona, «Mà amiga» with journalist Raquel Sans, and «Bricoheroes» (2020), as well as a version of the classic by La Trinca «La patata» (2021). In addition, in 2016 they participated in the charity album of the event with a version of the Catalan classic «Rosó». In 2020, they were the voice of the main theme of La Marató with a version of "The Show Must Go On" by Queen, performed from the rooftop of the Vall d'Hebron University Hospital. Obeses are also the authors and performers of the opening theme of the popular TV3 show Bricoheroes, which became one of the band's most recognizable mainstream contributions. They also created music for the Catalunya Ràdio and Canal 33 program La Renaixença, expanding their collaborations within the CCMA.

==== Anthems ====
The band has performed several anthems in major events in Catalonia. Among these, they have interpreted Els Segadors (the Catalan national anthem), the hymn of FC Barcelona, and other ceremonial music in institutional and sports contexts.

==== Performing arts ====
During the tour of the album Zel, Obeses took part in the charity concert Junts sumem where the leader of the band, Arnau Tordera, performed the aria Lascia ch'io pianga with tenor Jordi Domènech. During the 2014/2015 season they were part of the company that performed Dürrenmatt's work Frank V. Opereta d'una banca privada at the Teatre Lliure. The band's leader, Arnau Tordera, played the role of the waiter Guillaume and was one of those responsible for adapting the play, together with Sergi Belbel. The production was directed by Josep Maria Mestres.

== Recognition ==
=== Awards ===
Year	Award	Result	Reference
2015	Disc Xtrems from Ràdio Badalona	Winner	
2016	Enderrock Critics Award for Best Artist of 2015	Winner	
2016	Altaveu Award	Winner	
2016	Catalan Album of the Year from Ràdio 4	Winner	
2017	Enderrock Popular Vote Award for Best Artist of 2016	Nomination	
2017	Enderrock Popular Vote Award for Best Live Artist of 2016	Nomination	
2017	Miquel Martí i Pol Award, 10th Terra i Cultura Competition	Finalist	
2019	ARC Award for Best Tour for Artists or Bands in Catalan Venues	Winner	
2021	Capital of the Sardana Award for Artistic Proposals	Winner	

== Members ==
- Arnau Tordera: vocals and guitar (2010–present)
- Maiol Montané: drums (2010–present)
- Arnau Burdó "Burdi": keyboards (2010–present)
- Jaume Coll Mariné: electric bass and double bass (2010–present)

== Discography ==
=== Albums ===
- 2011 – Obesisme il·lustrat (Música Global).
- 2013 – Zel (Música Global)
- 2015 – Monstres i princeses (Música Global)
- 2017 – Verdaguer, ombres i maduixes (Música Global)
- 2018 – Fills de les estrelles (Música Global)
- 2021 – El resorgiment de l'Atlàntida (Música Global)
- 2024 – L'Ai al cor - Sístole (Música Global)

=== Singles ===
- 2020 – Bricoheroes (Música Global)
- 2024 – Amor Artificial (Música Global)

== See also ==
- Music of Catalonia
