= Castellet i la Gornal =

- Municipality
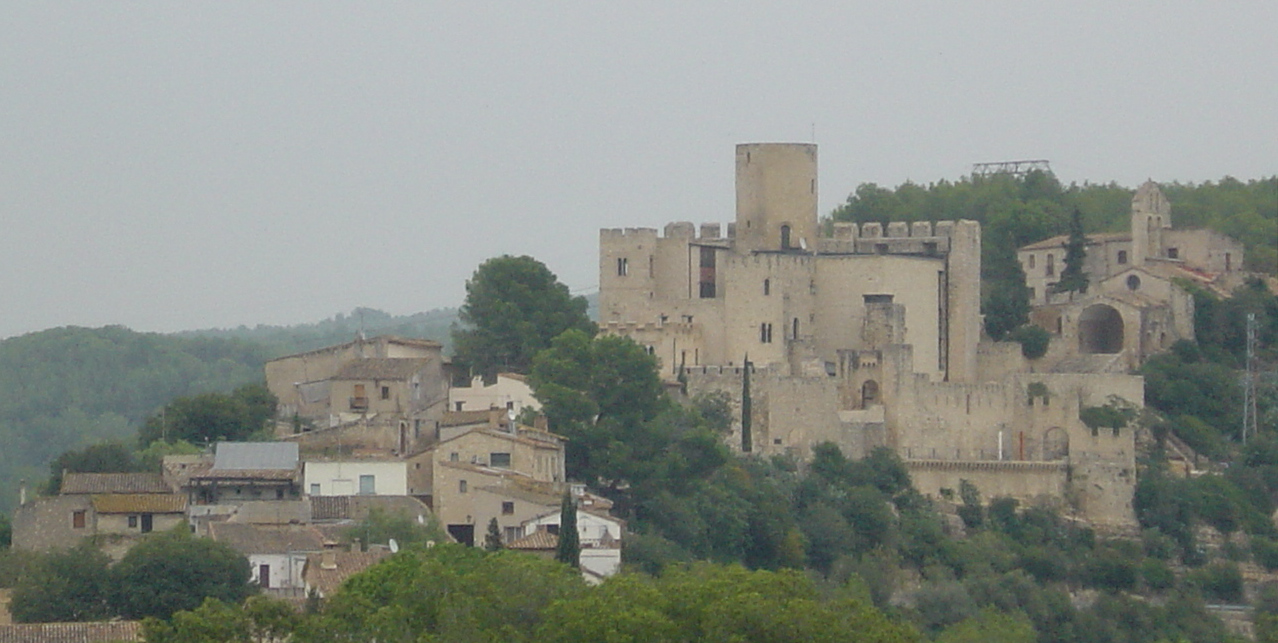
- Castle of Castellet and the Hermitage of St. Peter.

- Flag Coat of arms

- Location in Catalonia Castellet i la Gornal (Spain)
- Coordinates: 41.253°N 1.592°E
- Country: Spain
- Community: Catalonia
- Province: Barcelona
- Comarca: Alt Penedès

Government
  - Mayor: Miguel Delgado Almansa (2015)

Area
  - Total: 47.5 km^{2} (18.3 sq mi)
- Elevation: 137 m (449 ft)

Population (2025-01-01)
  - Total: 2,776
  - Density: 58.4/km^{2} (151/sq mi)
- Demonym: Castelletenc
- Postal code: 08058
- Website: www.castelletilagornal.net

Castellet i la Gornal (Catalan pronunciation: [kəstəˈʎɛt i lə ɣuɾˈnal]) is a municipality in the comarca of the Alt Penedès in Catalonia, Spain. It is situated in the valley of the Foix river at the point where it crosses the Coastal Range. The river is dammed to form the Foix Reservoir. The ajuntament (town hall) is in La Gornal. The municipality is served by the N-340 road, and by a local road to Vilanova i la Geltrú.

Population is dispersed among the villages of La Gornal, Les Cassettes, Castellet, Torrelletes, Les Masuques, Clariana, Sant Marçal i Masies de Sant Marçal, Rocallisa, Valldemar, Els Rosers, La Creu i els Àngels, and Trencarroques.

Castellet i la Gornal became part of the Alt Penedès in the comarcal revision of 1990: previously it formed part of the Garraf.

== Notable people ==
Singer Marina Rossell was born in the village of La Gornal.
