= Foix Reservoir =

Reservoir in Catalonia, Spain

- Embassament de Foix (Spanish)
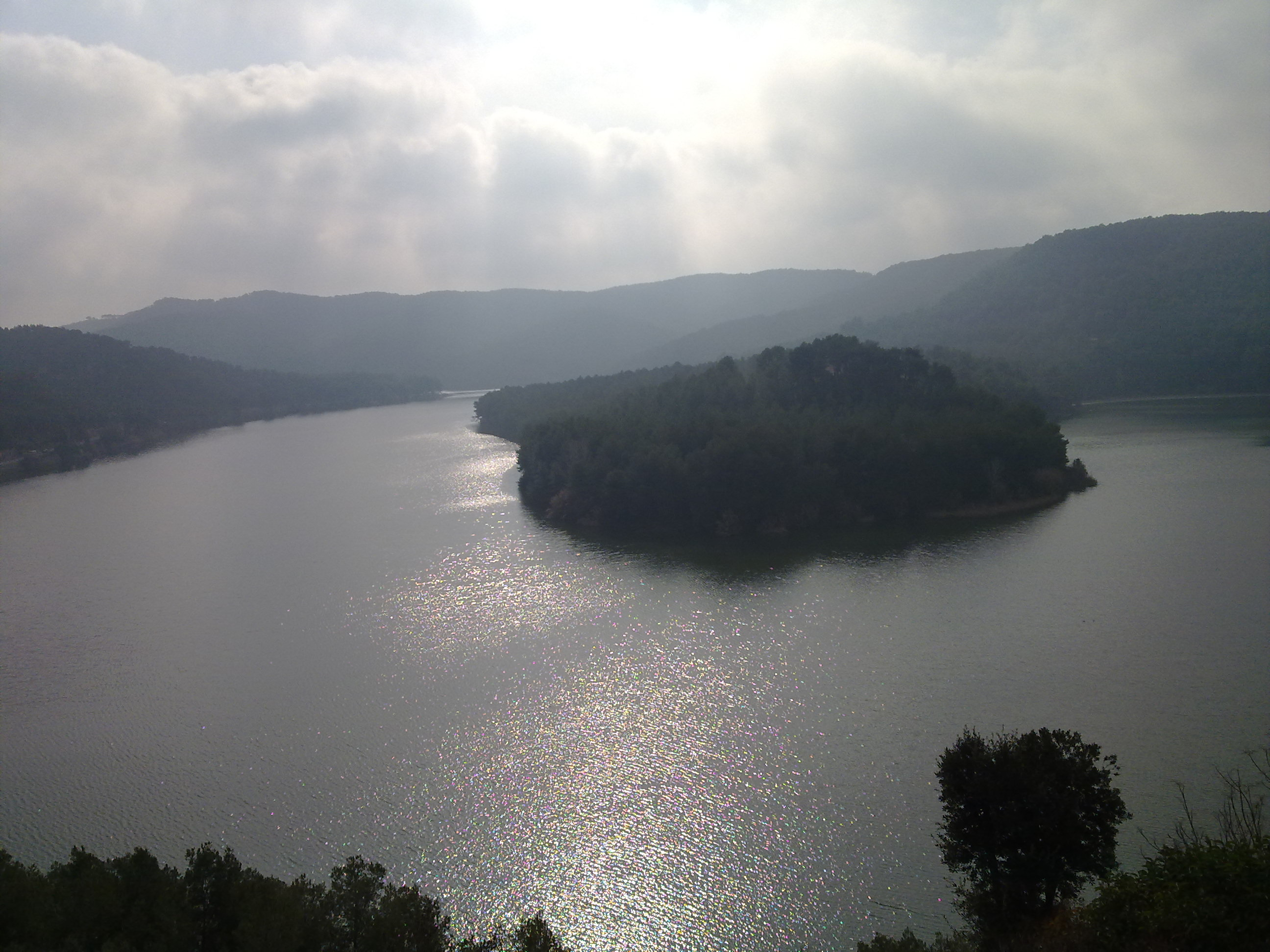
- The Foix Reservoir
- Interactive map of Foix Reservoir
- Location: Castellet i la Gornal, Alt Penedès, Barcelona, Catalonia, Spain
- Coordinates: 41°15′45″N 1°40′37″E
- River sources: Foix River
- Catchment area: Foix River
- Surface area: 66 ha (160 acres)
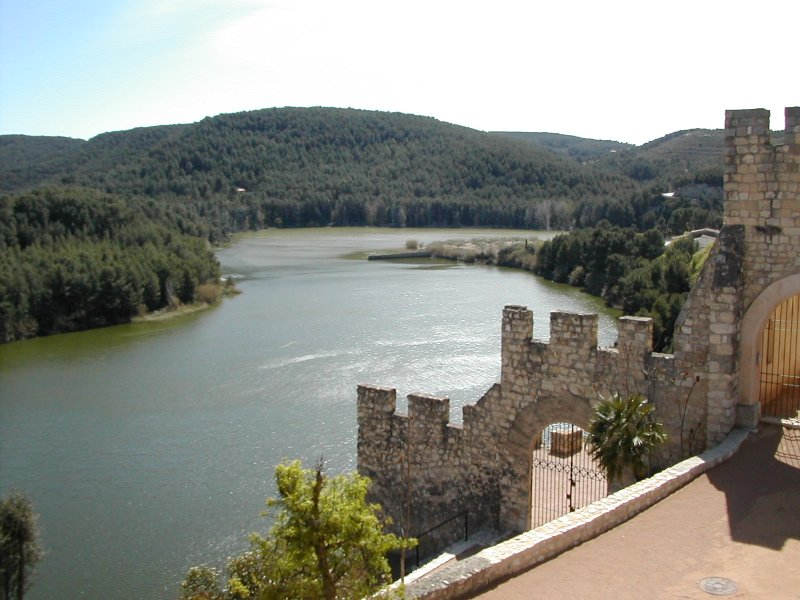
- Interactive map of Foix Reservoir
- Country: Spain
- Purpose: Irrigation
- Status: Operational
- Construction began: 1903
- Opening date: 1936

Dam and spillways
- Height: 38 m

The Foix Reservoir is a Spanish hydraulic infrastructure planned in 1901 and inaugurated in 1928. Located on the Foix River, a short river only 41 km long that originates in the Serra de la Llacuna, in the Anoia region. The dam is situated in the municipality of Castellet i la Gornal, in the comarca of Alt Penedès, bordering the Garraf region, in the province of Barcelona, Catalonia.

It covers 66 hectares, with an additional fluvial area incorporated into the reservoir, bringing its total area to 79 hectares.

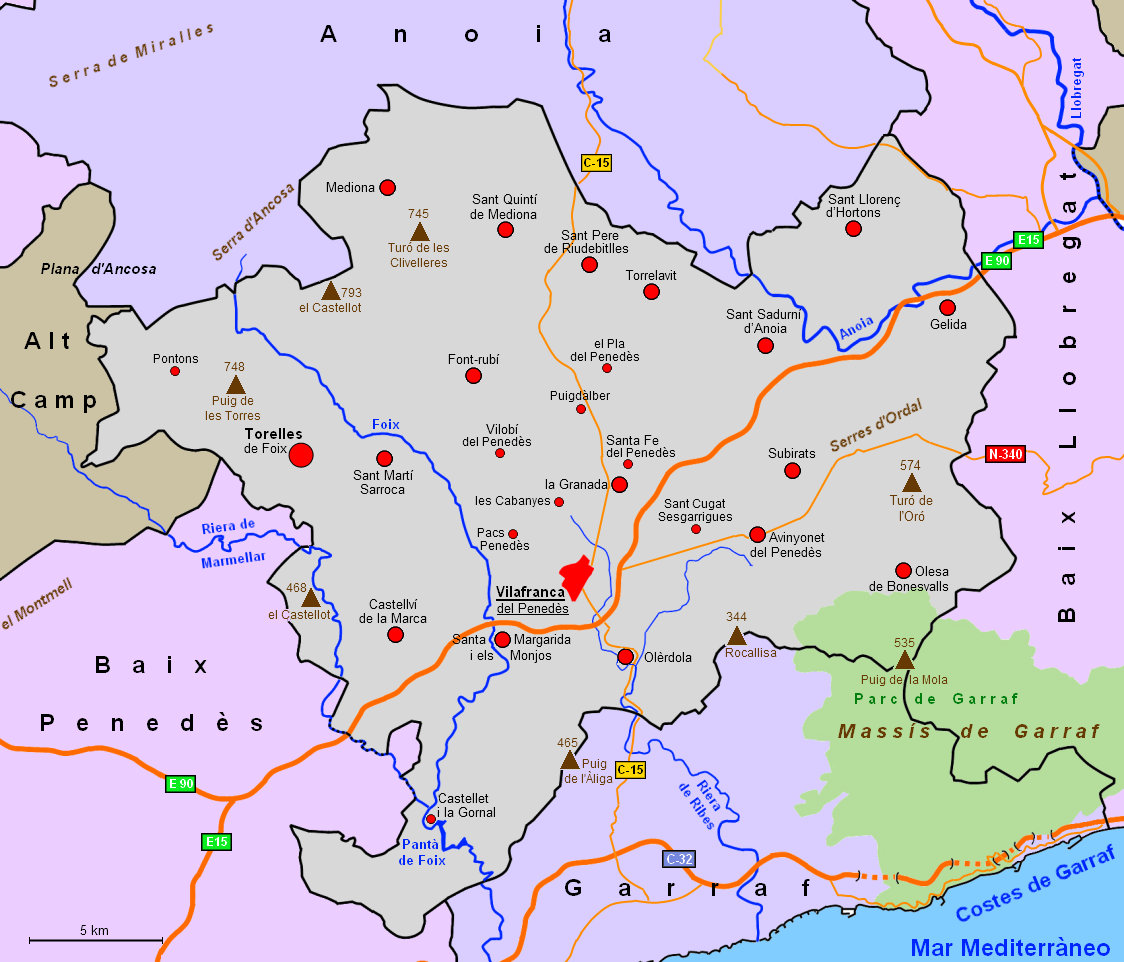
Alt Penedès.

It was built primarily to irrigate agricultural fields, as it is one of the few wetlands in the area.

Fishing was forbidden here due to presence of dangerous algae.

In recent years, the Foix River has become much cleaner, and the reservoir's water level has remained high, allowing for the growth of typical wetland and riverside vegetation (bulrush, reed canary grass, black poplars, etc.). Gradually, the area has been established as an ecological reserve, serving as a refuge for a wide variety of wildlife.

== History ==
The Foix reservoir was built in the early 20th century for agricultural purposes, mainly to irrigate vineyards in the area that had been severely affected by phylloxera pest.

The dam was completed in 1936, and irrigation began in 1937.

== Flora ==
The vegetation in the area is adapted to the Mediterranean climate, which is characterized by dry summers and porous soil that quickly absorbs rainwater. As a result, vegetation typical of xerophilous and calcicole communities is found here.

The Foix reservoir area features shrubland such as maquis dominated by lentisk and dwarf palm. In shadier areas, holm oak forests can be found, while elsewhere there are pinewoods and oak shrublands common to Mediterranean climates.

There is also riparian and freshwater vegetation, with ash trees, white poplars, and others scattered throughout. Reeds and riparian forests form a ring around the reservoir, complemented by pine forests surrounding the lake.

== Fauna ==
The reservoir is home to numerous bird species such as teal, mallards, and common moorhens, which feed on algae, seeds, and other aquatic plants. It also hosts many insectivorous birds that catch larvae, mosquitoes, and other invertebrates, such as little ringed plovers, great reed warblers, and nightingales. Other birds, like grey herons and little egrets, feed on fish, amphibians, and aquatic invertebrates.

Among the aquatic animals present in the Foix reservoir are carp, eels, and chub. Amphibians and reptiles such as toads, frogs, and salamanders also inhabit the waters.

However, birds are the most abundant fauna in the surrounding natural park, with over 150 catalogued species. During migration periods, up to 210 bird species can be observed.

=== Birds of the Foix Reservoir ===
Notable species include resident mallards, migratory ducks such as tufted ducks, marbled ducks, northern shovelers, common moorhens, little egrets, black-winged stilts, and occasionally the great cormorant. Other species include grey herons, black-crowned night herons, common kingfishers, little ringed plovers, great reed warblers, ospreys, common buzzards, long-tailed tits, barn swallows, reed buntings, purple herons, common coots, little grebes, white wagtails, and common nightingales.

=== Other species ===
The reservoir also has abundant carp and eels, reptiles like water snakes and turtles, and many bird species (about 150 species excluding seasonal migrants). Surrounding the lake are holm oak and stone pine forests.

=== Conservation of the Spanish pond turtle ===
There is an active conservation project for the Spanish pond turtle, which is a protected species. The release of exotic species such as the red-eared slider is prohibited, as it poses a threat to native turtles.

Access to the reservoir is via the BV-2115 road from Vilanova i la Geltrú to Castellet i la Gornal.

== Pollution ==
Water quality is a key factor directly affecting the flora and fauna of this ecosystem. Despite this, the waters of the Foix reservoir have been seriously degraded over the years due to agricultural, industrial, and residential activities.

Currently, water quality has declined due to eutrophication, the inflow of insufficiently treated wastewater, and contamination from various sources.

Nevertheless, the area is part of the PEIN protected natural space "El Foix" and the Natura 2000 site ES5110013 "Serralades Litorals Centrals." In 1993, a Special Protection Plan was approved, and the area is now managed by the Diputació de Barcelona through the Foix Park Consortium, formed by the municipalities of Castellet i la Gornal and Santa Margarida i els Monjos.

== See also ==
- List of dams and reservoirs in Catalonia
