= Serra de la Llacuna =

Mountain ridge in Anoia, Catalonia, Spain

Coordinates: 41°27′55″N 1°33′06″E

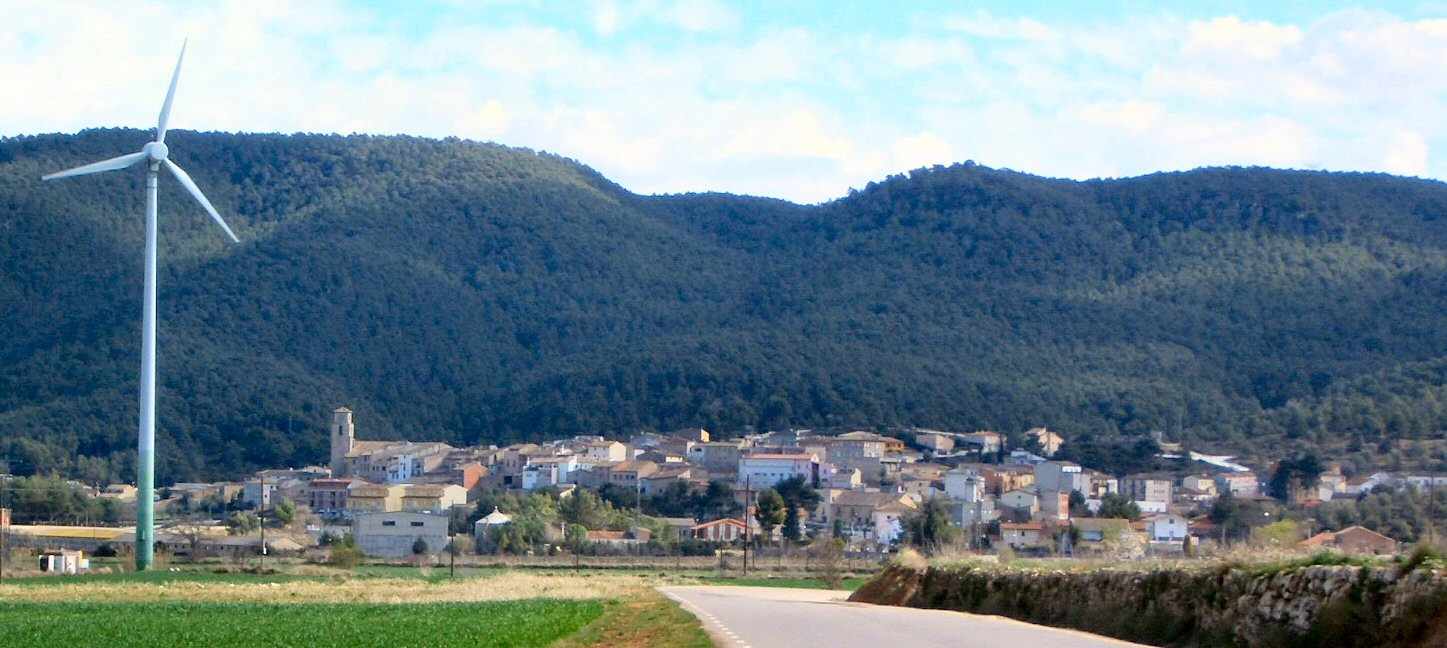
- Serra de la Llacuna rising behind the town of La Llacuna.

Highest point
- Elevation: 844 m (2,769 ft)

Geography
- Location: La Llacuna, Anoia, Catalonia, Spain
- Parent range: Catalan Pre‑Coastal Range

The Serra de la Llacuna (Catalan for "Small lake mountain range") is a modest mountain ridge located in the municipality of La Llacuna in the comarca of Anoia, Catalonia, Spain. Its highest point reaches approximately 844 metres above sea level.

== Geographic situation ==
The Serra de la Llacuna is part of the Catalan Pre-Coastal Range and belongs to the broader landscape unit known as the Serra d'Ancosa. This mountain ridge acts as a natural barrier between the valley carved by the Llacuna stream and the surrounding plains. It is situated in a transitional area where the elevated terrain of the Pre-Coastal Range gives way to the lower-lying lands of the Catalan Central Depression.

== Ecology ==
Forested with Mediterranean species such as holm oak, Aleppo pine, and shrubs like rosemary and heather, the Serra lies within a mosaic of forest and shrubland typical of the Anoia highlands. The ridge forms part of the rural landscape managed as forest reserve by local landowners, with pathways starting from La Llacuna and fountains such as Font Cuitora, Pla Novell, Font del Teix, and Font dels Horts frequently visited by hikers.

== Trails ==
Popular hiking and mountain‑bike routes cross the ridge, including several waymarked local loops.

== History and cultural significance ==
Visible from the ridge are the ruins of the medieval Castle of Vilademàger, first documented in 987 in a donation by Count Borrell II of Barcelona to the church of Sant Pere de Vic.

The ridge historically served as a rural boundary and grazing area for transhumant shepherds, contributing to local traditions of agro‑pastoral land use in La Llacuna.

== Nearby landmarks ==
- Castle of Vilademàger – medieval ruins perched atop a cliff on the Serra d’Ancosa ridge. The site offers commanding panoramic views over the plains and town of La Llacuna.
- Font Cuitora – a shaded natural spring and popular picnic area, serving also as a trailhead for routes into the ridge’s forest and the rocky outcrops known as “Roques de la Crida”.
- Puig Castellar – a 943 m summit in the same ridge system, visible from La Llacuna. It is included among the FEEC «100 cims» (Catalonia’s official list of highest peaks per comarca).
