= Castle of Vilademàger =

Coordinates: 41°28′22″N 1°33′01″E

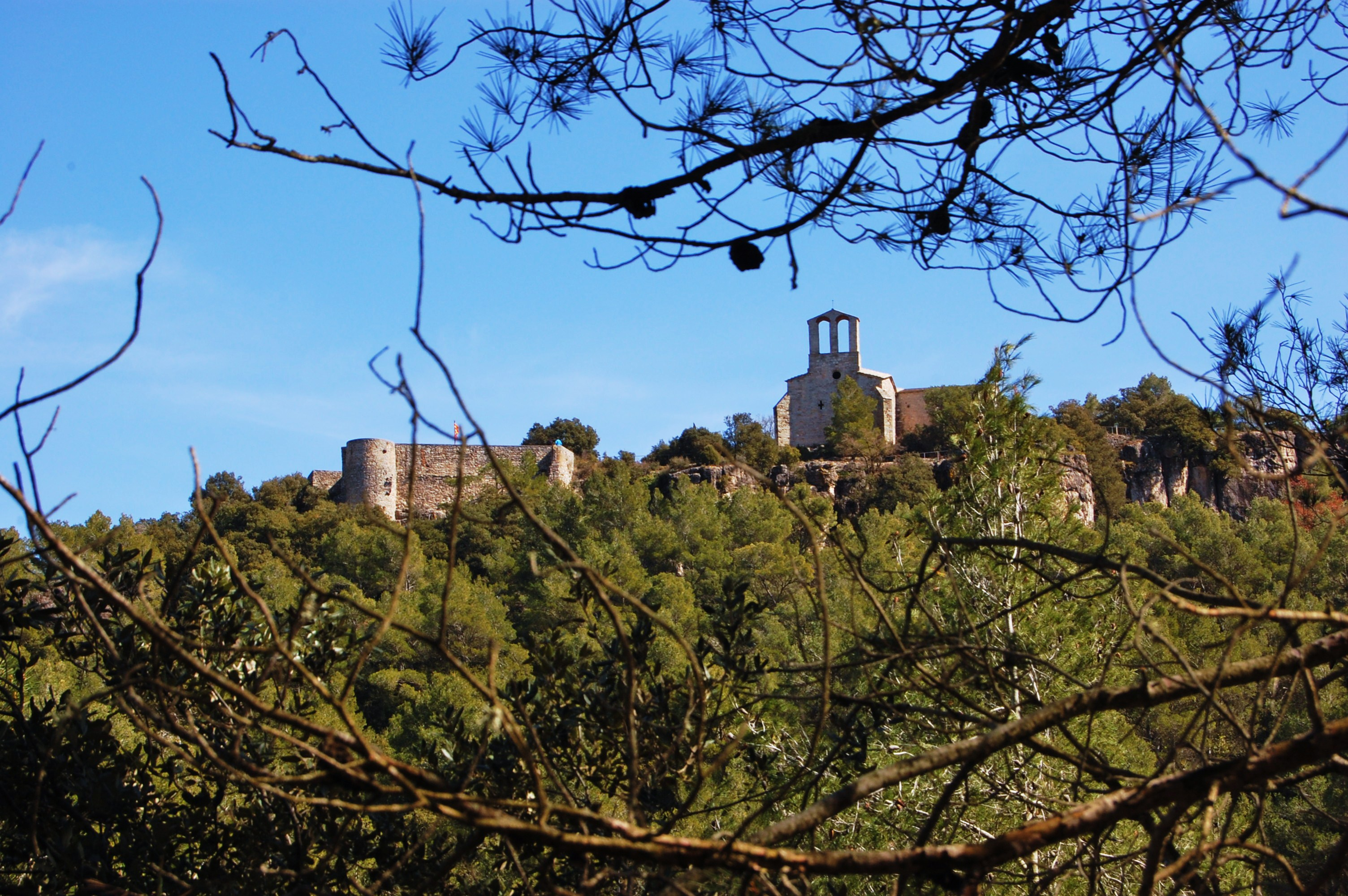
- View of the castle and the church
- Interactive map of the Castle of Vilademàger area

General information
- Architectural style: Gothic
- Location: Camí de can Marquet or del Castell, La Llacuna (Anoia)

The Castle of Vilademàger is a medieval fortification located in the municipality of La Llacuna (Anoia, Catalonia, Spain). It was constructed at the end of the 10th century and consists of an upper defensive complex and a lower enclosure containing the church of Saint Peter of Vilademàger.

Built during the early Middle Ages, the fortress served as a defensive and administrative center in the region. The site preserves parts of the main tower and walled enclosure, together with sections of ramparts and a gateway, which are thought to have once protected both the church and the original settlement that later expanded onto the surrounding plain.

The remains visible today include sections of the eastern tower and stretches of the surrounding walls, while to the west a gateway and additional wall fragments can still be identified. These elements suggest the existence of a second line of fortifications that not only enclosed the church but also provided protection for the first nucleus of the village, before the settlement gradually moved down onto the plain.

== Location ==
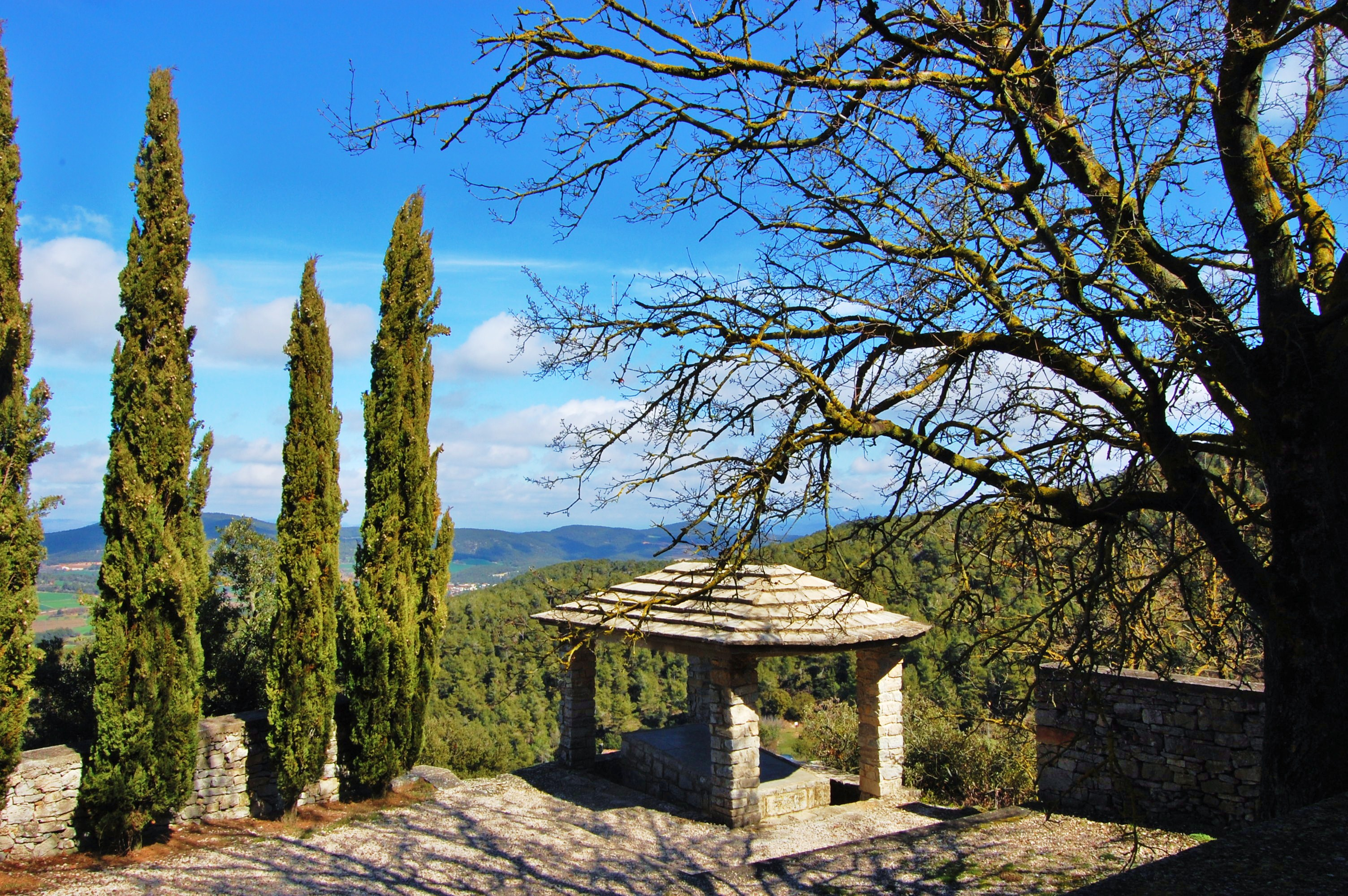
Mass grave of the castle

The ruins of the castle and the church rise atop a cliff, on the southeastern side of the plain of La Llacuna, from which one can enjoy a magnificent panoramic view of the town of La Llacuna and its surroundings.

Access is via a partially paved track that starts from the eastern end of La Llacuna. The path passes by the schools and the cemetery until reaching the esplanade below the castle. On the left, a small path climbs up to the castle from the west.

== History ==
The first records referring to the Castle of Vilademàger date from the year 987, when it is mentioned as one of the boundaries in the donation made by Count Borrell II to the Church of Saint Peter of Vic. In the 11th century, the domain belonged to the comital house of Barcelona, and in 1022 it was enfeoffed to Bernat Sendred of Gurb-Queralt, who was also lord of the Castle of Queralt. In 1079, it passed to the Cervelló lineage, who were related to the Queralt family, while maintaining vassalage to the Counts of Barcelona. The Cervelló family subinfeudated the castle to the Vilademàger.

Starting in 1347, the fortress became part of the Barony of La Llacuna, which held jurisdiction over it together with Miralles, Rocamora, and later, Santa Perpètua de Mogoda. In 1370, it was under the lordship of Guillem Ramon de Cervelló. Ownership passed from the Cervelló family to the Montcada lineage and later to the Dukes of Medinaceli. In 1831, ownership of the barony was shared by the Marquess of Aitona and the Marquess of Moja.

== Remains ==
The defensive complex was built between the 10th and 11th centuries, with some later modifications. What remains includes an entrance gate, part of the keep tower, and remnants of the enclosure, around the old parish church of Sant Pere de Màger.

It consists of a chimney-shaped tower that protected the most accessible part. Attached to it are walls from a room of the castle and remains of walls enclosing the more vulnerable parts of the complex, which, in the northern sector, is reinforced by small semicircular towers. On the eastern side, remains of the wall, the entrance gate, and the access path to the castle can be seen. The entrance gate of the walls is a semicircular voussoired arch, located near a buttress. The walls are made of ashlar with mortar, which in some sectors are neither hewn nor cut.

== See also ==
- Early Middle Ages
- 10th century

== Bibliography ==
- La Catalunya Romànica,vol. 3 L'Anoia i altres. Editorial Pòrtic. September 1999.
- Catalunya Romànica,vol. XIX El Penedès L'Anoia. Enciclopèdia Catalana. 1992.
