= Santa Perpètua de Gaià =

- Locality
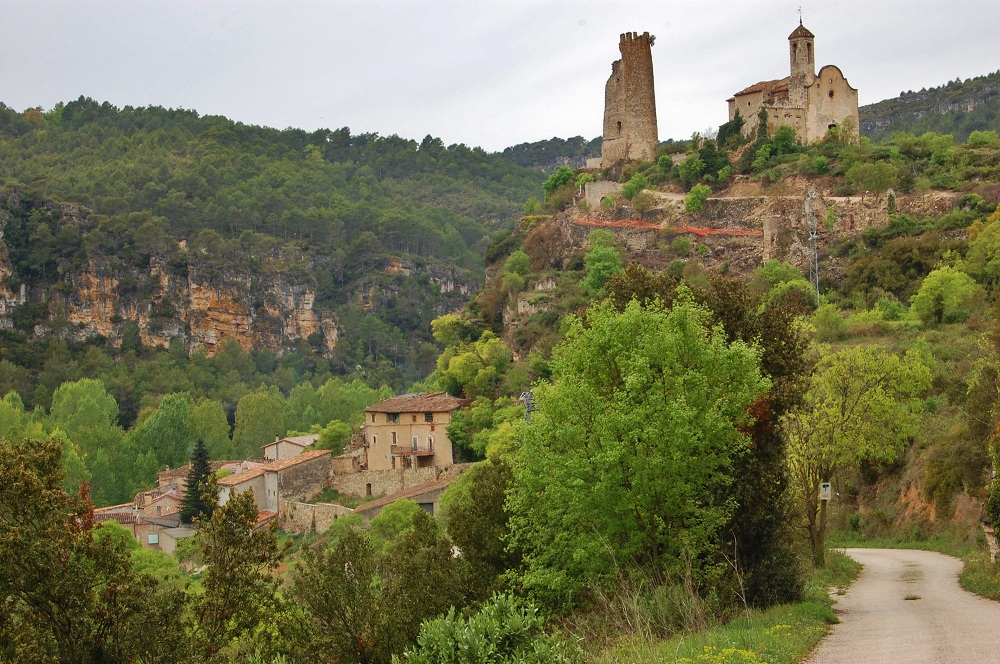
- The village, the castle and the church of Santa Maria
- Interactive map of Santa Perpètua de Gaià
- Location in Catalonia Santa Perpètua de Gaià (Spain)
- Coordinates (Village centre): 41.46275°N 1.39154°E
- Country: Spain
- Autonomous community: Catalonia
- Province: Tarragona
- Comarca: Conca de Barberà
- Municipality: Pontils
- Elevation: 578 m (1,896 ft)

Santa Perpètua de Gaià is a population center belonging to the municipality of Pontils, in the Conca de Barberà, Catalonia, Spain, which gave its name until 1995.

It is located at the foot of the hill from which the Castle of Santa Perpètua dominates part of the valley of the Gaià River, at an altitude of 578 m. Of the castle, the slender tower with a triangular interior is particularly noteworthy. Next to it stands the church of Santa Maria.

Its name gave rise to the Legend of Santa Perpètua de Gaià.

== History ==
The tax registers of the years 1365–70 record 37 families for Santa Perpètua and Guillem Ramon de Cervelló as lord. At the end of the 15th century the Cervelló, barons of La Llacuna, are documented, and according to the 1496 tax register the population experienced a sharp decline: only ten families are counted in the place.

In the modern era, in 1599, the lord is documented as the Count of Savallà, Bernat de Boixadors. In the late 18th century and until the end of the seigneuries it belonged to the Marquesses of Aitona; it was then, in the mid-19th century, when Santa Perpètua reached its maximum demographic peak, since the municipality as a whole had 1,030 inhabitants, about 400 of whom lived in the village.

In 1933, the municipality, until then known as Santa Perpètua, was renamed Santa Perpètua de Gaià.
