= Gerard Quintana =

Gerard Quintana i Rodeja
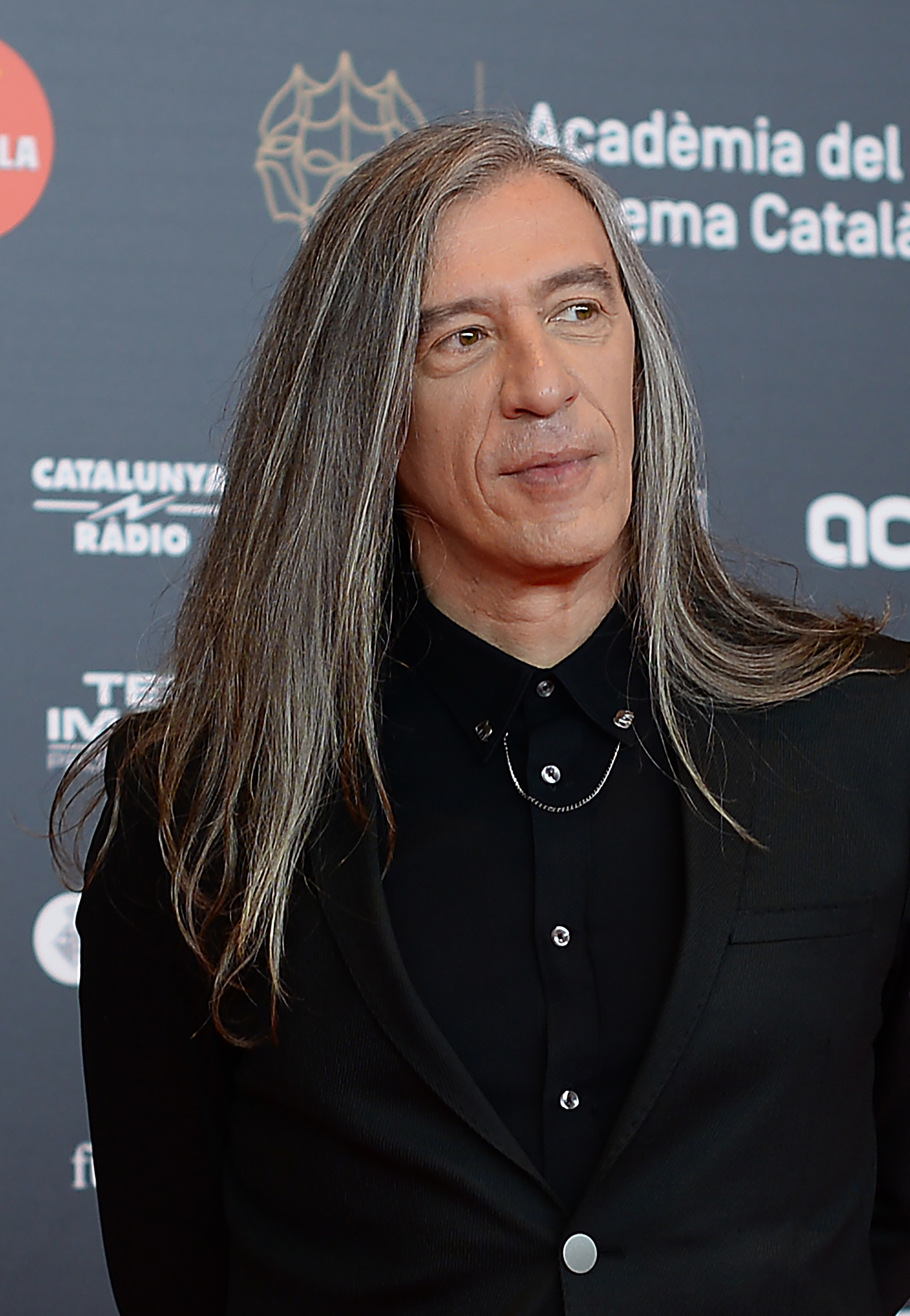
- Quintana in 2020

Background information
- Born: 27 November 1964 (age 61); Girona, Catalonia, Spain
- Genres: Rock, rock català, pop
- Occupations: Singer, songwriter, novelist, poet, actor
- Years active: 1986–present

Gerard Quintana i Rodeja (Catalan pronunciation: [ʒəˈɾaɾt kinˈtanə]; born 27 November 1964) is a Catalan singer, songwriter, poet, novelist, actor, and radio and TV personality. He first came to prominence in 1986-2001 as the lead singer of the rock band Sopa de Cabra. Sopa de Cabra was one of the leading bands of the rock català genre. Since the dissolution of the band in 2001, Quintana has pursued a successful solo career. As a singer-songwriter, he completed five albums between 2003 and 2010, together with three in collaboration with Jordi Batiste, and a recent album (2014) with Xarim Aresté. He also writes and publishes poetry, and has written regularly as a journalist for online Catalan newspapers and journals. He appeared in the short film Diogenes, the dog. Since the publication of his first novel in 2019 he is also establishing himself as a serious novelist.

During the temporary reunion of Sopa de Cabra in 2011 to celebrate 25 years since the band's formation and ten since its final appearances, Quintana returned to his original rock-star style of singing and performance, and the concerts were based solely on the band's extensive existing repertoire. Since then, the band has reformed and released two albums of new songs in 2015 and 2020.

Quintana is also a well-known figure in Catalan culture quite apart from his musicianship. In recent years he has expressed his personal political and ideological views, including his support for Catalan independence. He is currently the President of the Acadèmia Catalana de la Música, an organisation dedicated to the interests of musicians of all kinds in Catalonia.

== Musical career ==
=== Sopa de Cabra, 1986–2001 and 2011 ===
In the mid-1980s, Quintana was a member of a group of young musicians, writers and artists based on a squat in Girona. His role was initially more as a writer, both of poetry and in the journalistic sphere of producing fanzines, than as a singer and performer. Indeed, in a magazine interview published in 2010, Quintana revealed that in spite of his lifelong deep love of music, his initial youthful ambition was to be a writer, because as a child he was too shy to contemplate performing in public.

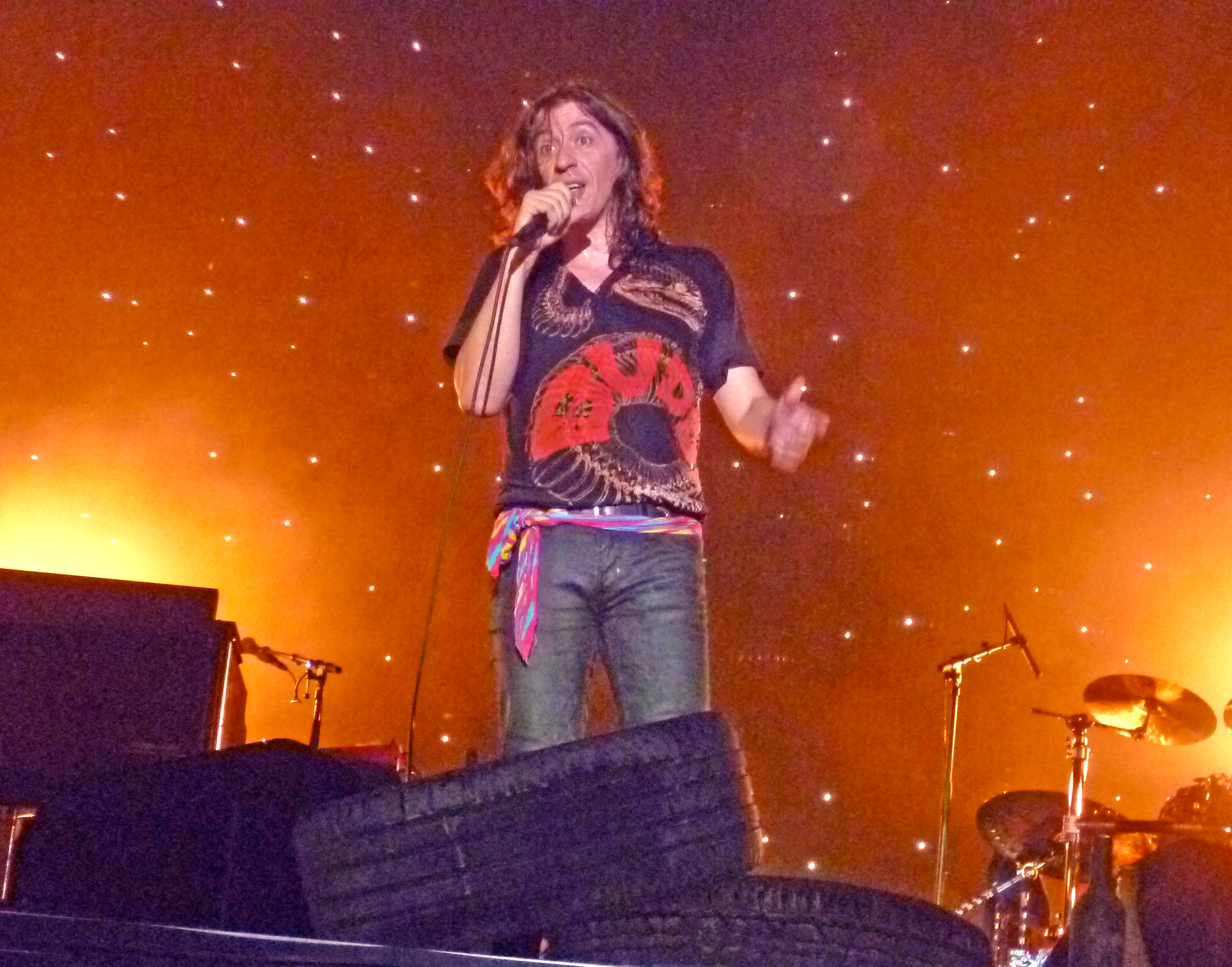
Gerard Quintana on stage in Girona, 1 October 2011, during the final concert of the Sopa de Cabra anniversary tour.

In March 2011, the surviving members of Sopa de Cabra announced a single anniversary reunion concert on 9 September 2011 to celebrate 25 years since the founding of the band, and ten years since its dissolution and final performances; the demand for tickets resulted in plans for a full tour of seven concerts, three in Barcelona, one each in Palma and Tarragona, and culminating with two, on 30 September and 1 October in the band's home town of Girona.

=== Solo career ===
In the late 1990s, while Sopa de Cabra was still actively touring and recording, Quintana also worked with Jordi Batiste, a respected Catalan musician of a slightly older generation, on Catalan covers of the work of Bob Dylan, one of Quintana's own major musical inspirations. As 'Miralls de Dylan' ('Mirrors of Dylan'), they released two albums (in 1998 and 2000), and in 2012, the collaboration continued with a series of concerts and a third CD.

Since the planned dissolution of Sopa in 2001–2002, Quintana has continued his career as a musician, writer, poet and actor. His first solo album was Senyals de fum ('Smoke signals'), in 2003. This was followed by another four successful albums and by many public performances, all in a personal and poetic style that contrasts in many ways with the traditional pop/rock music of Sopa. He has worked with many significant figures in Catalan music, including Francesc Bertran, Quimi Portet, Albert Pla, Pep Sala, Amadeu Casas, Pascal Comelade and the group Gossos. His 2010 album, De terrat en terrat ('From roof to roof') amounts to a personal musical portrait of the city of Barcelona and its lively, multicultural ambience.

One of Quintana's more high-profile activities in 2013 was the part he took both in organising (as artistic director, with Lluís Danés) and performing in the Concert per la Llibertat (Concert for Freedom) held at the Camp Nou, Barcelona Football Club's ground, on 29 June 2013. Though the keyword was 'freedom' rather than 'independence', the political sub-text was clear. In the first half of the concert, Quintana once again appeared with the old Sopa de Cabra line-up, performing Camins, one of the band's most famous songs. Towards the end of the concert, accompanied by Xarim Aresté and Pascal Comelade, he sang the powerful and dramatic Lluís Llach song I si canto trist ('if my song is sad').

=== 2015 onwards: the return of Sopa de Cabra ===
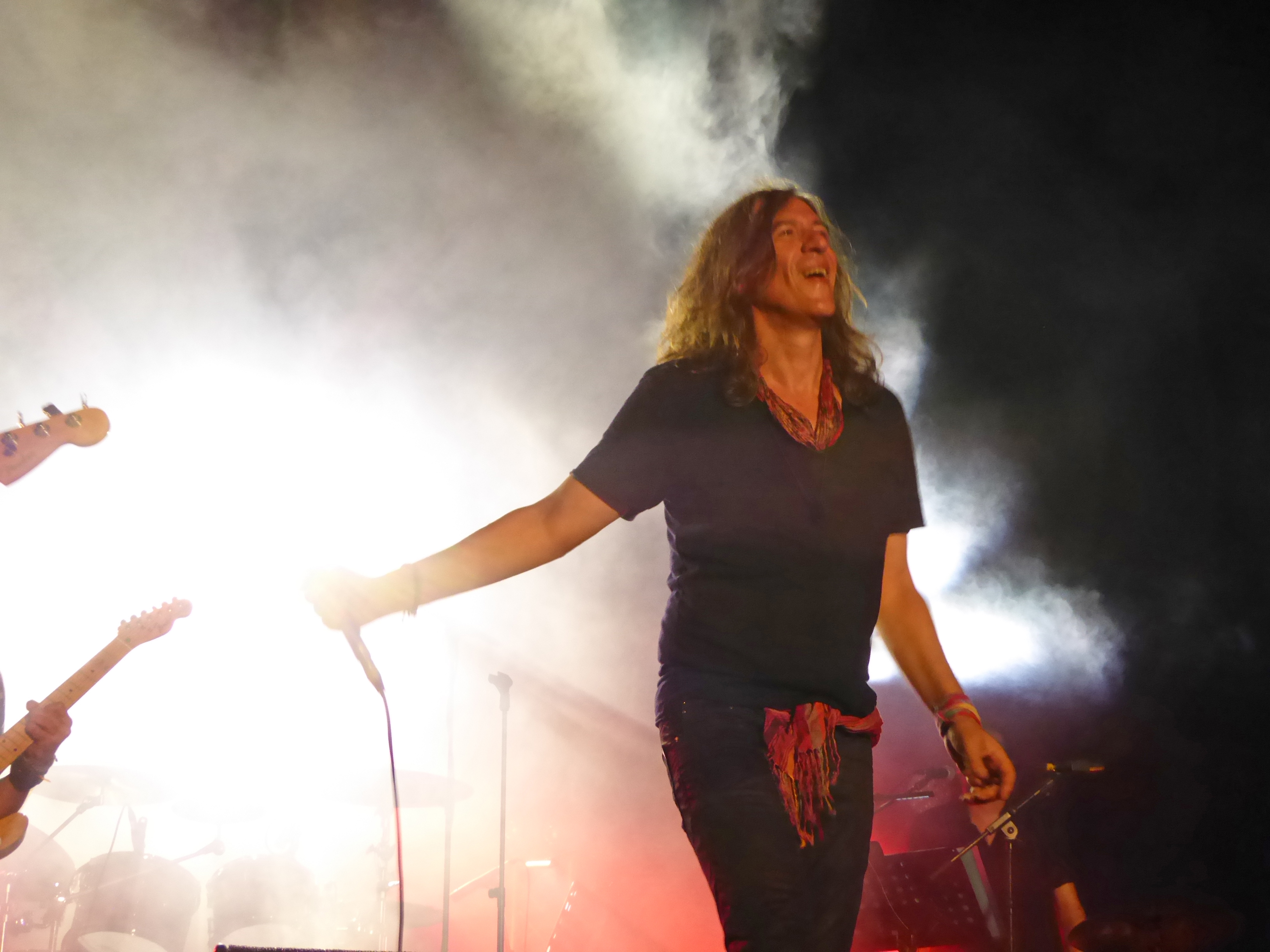
Gerard Quintana on stage, July 2017

After the successful reunion and tour of 2011, questions about a future return of the band were avoided by its members, all of whom had musical and other projects of their own. But early in 2015, rumours of another reunion became widespread. On 28 March 2015, a surprise concert on a rooftop in Girona heralded news of the return of the band with new songs and a new album.

Another two years elapsed before the release of another album, La gran onada (‘The great wave’) in February 2020. A special open-air concert for a small invited audience took place at the great Graeco-Roman site of Empúries a few days before the record went on sale, and was filmed by the Catalan television Channel TV3.

== Writing career ==
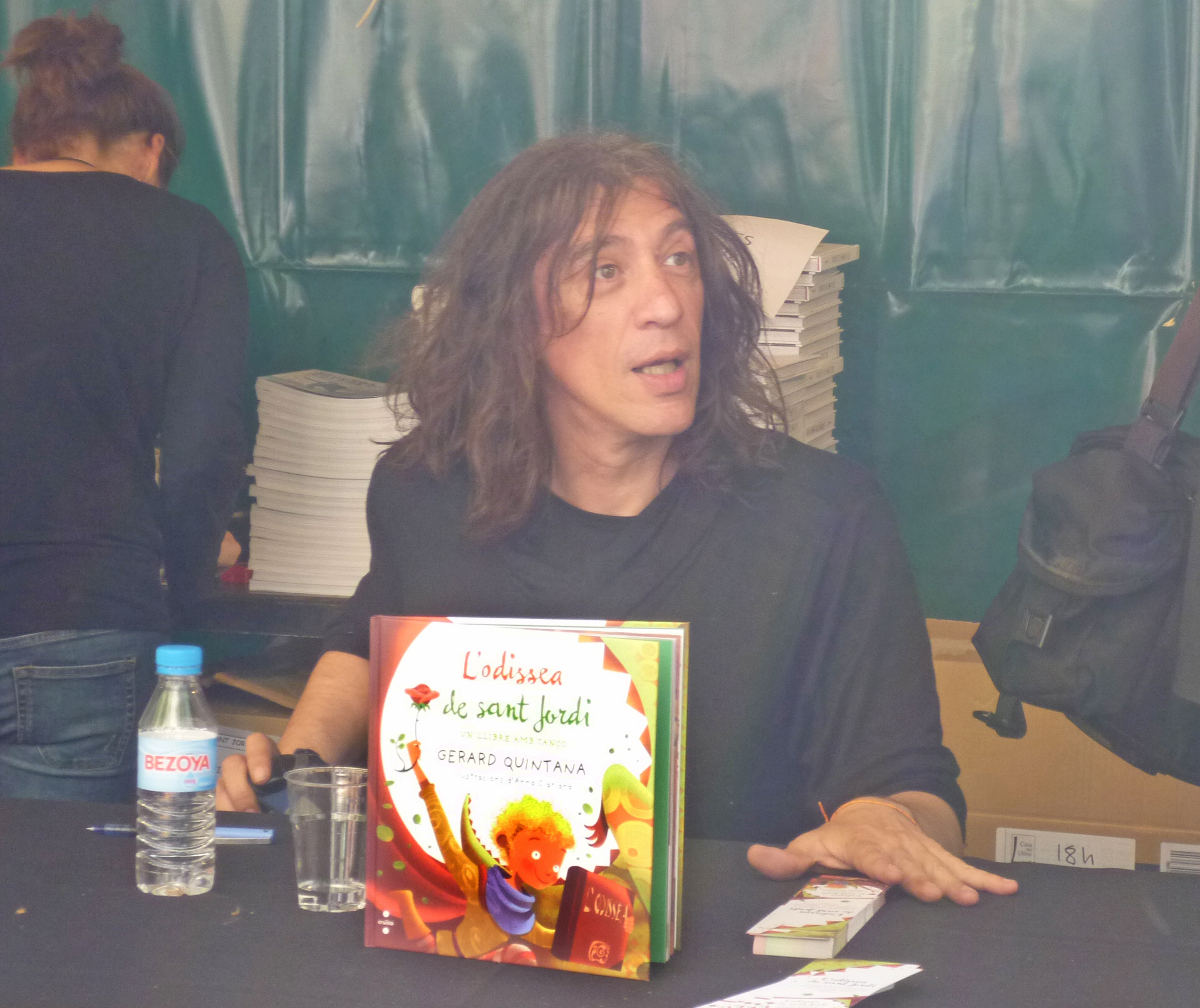
Gerard Quintana signing copies of his new book. Barcelona, 23 April 2015

Although Quintana had regularly published articles in newspapers, it was not until April 2012 that he published his first full-length book, Més enllà de les estrelles ('Beyond the stars'), a personal account of the 2011 tour. It includes many autobiographical insights, and paints a picture of the complex organisation and hard work behind a rock tour. The book is illustrated with photographs by David Julià.

His second book was published in February 2015, an unexpected departure into a completely different literary genre: a story for young children. L’odissea de sant Jordi ('The Odyssey of Saint George') is an original take on the legend of Saint George (the patron saint of Catalonia) with charming illustrations by Anna Clariana. The story blends the usual Catalan legend of the saint with elements of Greek mythology, such as a one-eyed giant and dangerously seductive Sirens. Quintana's Saint George is at first a very timid little boy who is continually frightened by the world around him. But he embarks on a journey alone to try to face up to his fears and conquer them, armed only with a book, symbolising knowledge, and a rose, symbolising love. The magical power of music also enters into the story, and the song that assists Jordi when he finally encounters the dragon is a real one, written and performed by Quintana and Aresté, that can be downloaded via the publisher’s website or by way of a QR code printed within and on the back cover of the book.

In March 2019, Quintana’s first full-length novel, Entre el Cel i la Terra (‘Between heaven and earth') was published. A second hardback edition was printed in the same year, and at present (2021), the work is available in hardback, paperback and in audio and e-book formats. It is an account of complex personal and family relationships set chiefly in Barcelona and Girona from 1952 to the end of the 20th century.

Quintana wrote his second novel in 2020, during the restrictions caused by the COVID-19 pandemic, which greatly affected the band's planned concert tour to promote their new album. The book, L’home que va viure dues vegades ('The man who lived twice') was published in March 2021, and is the recipient of the Ramon Llull Novel Award for 2021, a prestigious prize awarded each year for literary fiction in the Catalan language.

== Film ==
In 2014, Quintana took the lead part in a short film, written, directed and produced by Mateu Ciurana, entitled Diògenes, el gos (Diogenes, the dog). Filmed in Caldes de Malavella, the film transfers the legendary meeting between the 4th-century BC Greek philosopher Diogenes and the young Alexander the Great into a modern setting. The script incorporates many of the sayings of the Cynic philosopher and the anecdotes about him that have been passed down since antiquity.

== Discography ==
=== With Sopa de Cabra ===
- Sopa de Cabra (1989)
- La Roda (1990)
- Ben endins (1991) (live recording)
- Girona 83-87: Somnis de Carrer (1992)
- Mundo infierno (1993)
- Al∙lucinosi (1994)
- Sss… (1996)
- La nit dels anys (1997) (live)
- Nou (1998)
- Dies de carretera (2000)
- Plou i fa sol (2001)
- Bona nit, malparits! (2002) (live)
- El llarg viatge (2003) (live)
- El Retorn (2011) (CD and DVD of the anniversary tour)
- Les millors cançons (2011) (a 'best of' compilation)
- Re/Ebullació (2011) (the 14 Sopa de Cabra singles from 1989-1992, with a DVD of the 1991 concert at the Zeleste)
- Cercles (2015)
- La nit dels Sopa (2018) (live, recorded at concerts in Girona on 9 December 2017, and Porreres (Mallorca) on 12 August 2016)
- La Gran Onada (2020)

=== With Jordi Batiste ===
- Els miralls de Dylan (1998)
- Sense reina ni as (2000)
- Forever young / Per sempre jove (2012)

=== As solo artist ===
- Senyals de fum (2003)
- Les claus de sal (2004)
- Per un tros de cel (2005)
- Treu banya (2007)
- De terrat en terrat (2010)

=== With Xarim Aresté ===
- Tothom ho sap (2014)

== Books ==
- Més enllà de les estrelles (2012) (Account of the 2011 tour)
- L’odissea de sant Jordi (2015) (Children's book)
- Entre el Cel i la Terra (2019) (Novel)
- L’home que va viure dues vegades (2021) (Novel)
