= Foix (river) =

River in Catalonia, Spain

Coordinates: 41°25′20″N 1°33′55″E

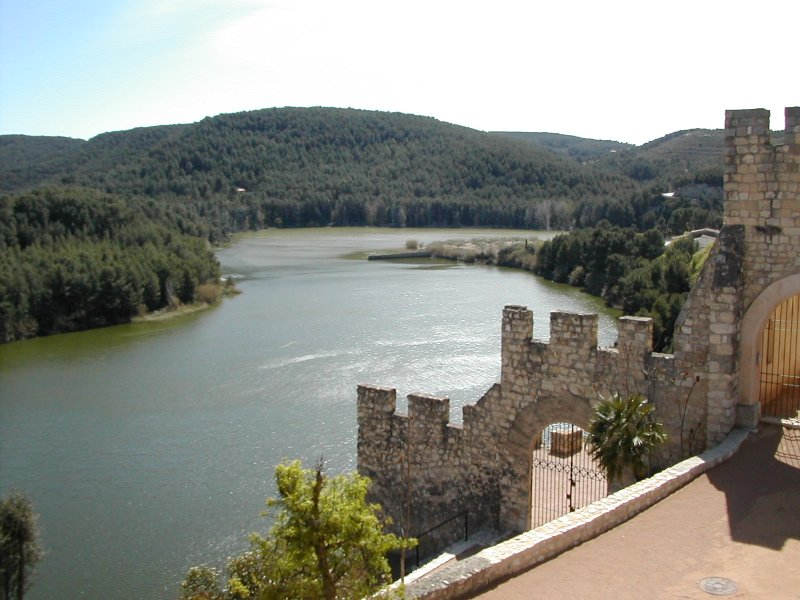
- Foix reservoir, view from Castellet

Location
- Country: Spain

Physical characteristics
- Source
  - elevation: 800 m (2,600 ft)
- Mouth
  - location: Mediterranean Sea
- Length: 41 km (25 mi)
- Basin size: 312 km^{2} (120 sq mi)
- Discharge
  - average: 0.28 m^{3}/s (9.9 cu ft/s)

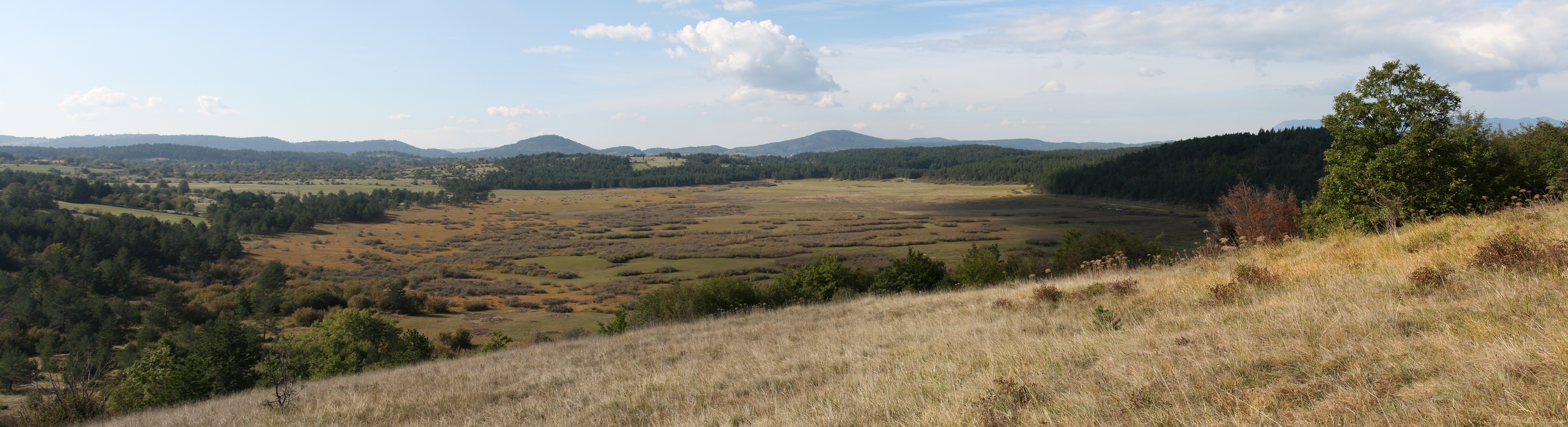

The Foix (Catalan pronunciation: [ˈfoʃ]) is a river in Catalonia in the province of Barcelona, northeastern Spain. Its source is near La Llacuna in the Comarca of Anoia 800m above sea level. Later it runs through the Comarca of Alt Penedès, where it feeds the Foix Reservoir in the nature reserve of Parc del Foix since 1928, which is highly important for the drinking water supply of the densely populated coastal plain between Barcelona and Tarragona. Then it goes through the Comarca of Garraf from north to the south where it ends into the Mediterranean Sea west of the village of Cubelles. This little delta became an important natural reserve and recreational area after the campground ″Camping Paradiso″ was removed in the late 1990s.

For most of the year, the river is dried up because of the dam and because of hot-summer climatical reasons. That can suddenly change in the winter months when heavy rain comes down in the mountains.

== See also ==
- List of rivers of Spain
- Dry lake
