= Peyu =

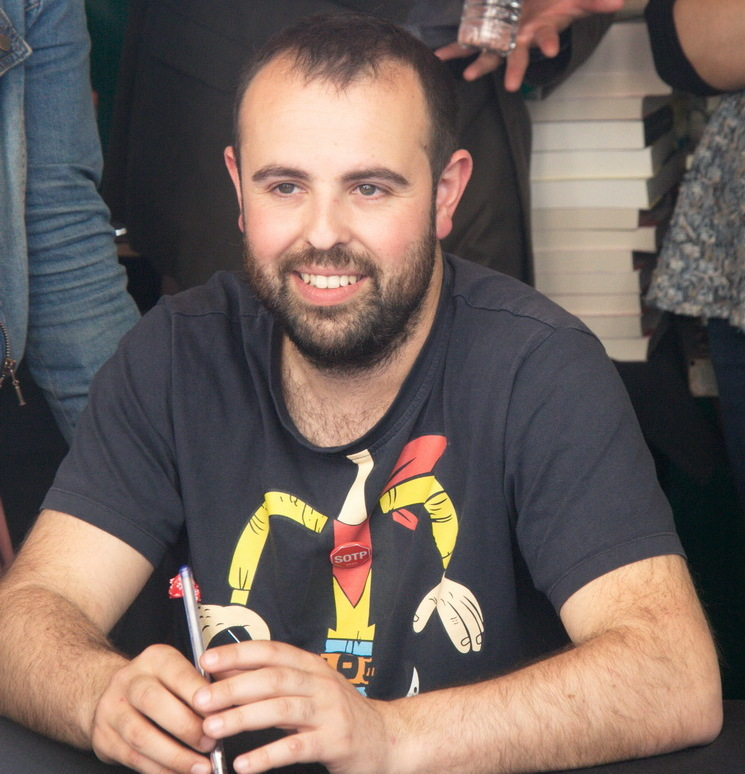
- Peyu in 2023
- Born: Lluís Jutglar Calvés; August 5, 1986 (age 39); Les Masies de Voltregà, Catalonia
- Occupation(s): Comedian, actor, scriptwriter, radio presenter
- Years active: 2002–present

Peyu (born 5 August 1986, Les Masies de Voltregà), stage name of Lluís Jutglar Calvés, is a Catalan comedian known for his appearances on radio, television and theatre.

== Career ==
At the age of sixteen, he created his first comedy theatre show together with Roger Codina, titled Kisca, kisca. He collaborated in television programmes such as Piscina comunitària (2009) and Working (2009) on Canal Català. As a radio broadcaster, he began his career on El matí i la mare que el va parir on Ràdio Flaixbac, Fricandó matiner on RAC 105 and Toni Clapés' Versió RAC 1. He also contributed to other programmes such as La tribu (2014) and El suplement on Catalunya Ràdio (2012–2013).

While studying audiovisual communication at the Autonomous University of Barcelona, he took a dubbing course at the Eòlia School of Dramatic Arts. He has dubbed some characters in Catalan, such as King Arthur in Shrek the Third, and also took part in the dubbing of Indiana Jones and the Kingdom of the Crystal Skull.

On television, he played a prominent role in the TV3 programme Alguna Pregunta Més? with a segment dedicated to highlighting urban planning blunders in Catalonia, titled Ole Tú!. Following this segment, in 2015 he published his first book, Oletú, els millors nyaps urbanístics catalans, released by Ara Llibres, which became the second best-selling non-fiction book on Sant Jordi in 2015. He also collaborated as a comedian on the programme Còmics Show, presented by Àngel Llàcer.

After working as a contributor in different shows, he eventually came to host his own, Natura sàvia. In this programme, produced and designed by himself through his production company Corral de l'humor, his most personal style could be seen. In 2019, together with Jair Domínguez, he premiered Bricoheroes, a parody of DIY shows, which was first broadcast on TVC’s digital channels. Since 2020, along with Domínguez and Neus Rossell, he has presented the satirical programme El búnquer on Catalunya Ràdio, which is broadcast daily from Monday to Friday from an undisclosed location. He has also appeared for several seasons as a contributor on TV3’s Està passant, providing a comic take on the most unlikely local news stories.

One of his most popular gags took place on RAC 105, when he prank-called the Civil Guard to inform them he had a pro-independence flag hanging on his balcony. He also gained notoriety with a viral video titled La puta i la Ramoneta ("The whore and the Ramoneta") and another addressed to Banc Sabadell during the 2015 Catalan election campaign.

In theatre, he has created and performed various humour shows, usually structured as theatrical plays rather than stand-up routines. In late 2022, he premiered the show L'Il·lusionista.

In June 2017, he made his first film appearance in Mil coses que faria per tu, directed by Dídac Cervera, playing a key role alongside Peter Vives.

Beyond his work as a comedian, in 2018 he created the goat cheese brand Les cabres d'en Peyu, marketed in several shops. Part of the profits go to the Osona Functional Diversity Association (AFGO).

Since 2025 he has been co-hosting the historical and cultural programme La Renaixença on Catalunya Ràdio and Canal 33, together with Arnau Tordera. In 2024, he also launched a music and comedy festival in Osona under the same name, focusing on Catalan heritage and satire.

He is the father of two daughters.
