= Cesk Freixas =

Spanish singer-songwriter

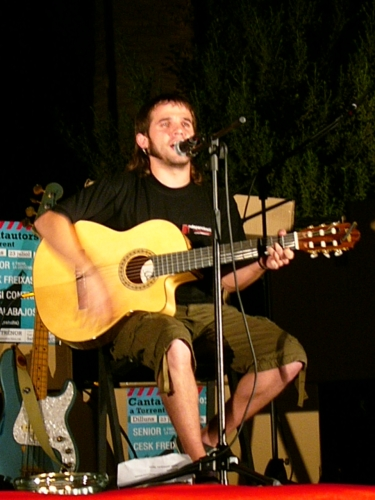

Background information
- Born: Francesc Freixas i Morros; Sant Pere de Riudebitlles, Catalonia
- Genres: singer-songwriter; protest; folk; Nova Cançó
- Occupations: Singer-songwriter, politician, writer
- Years active: 2004–present

Francesc Freixas i Morros (born 1984, Sant Pere de Riudebitlles, Alt Penedès, Catalonia, Spain) is a Catalan singer-songwriter. Freixas has released a sampler, seven albums, and a series of covers of international singer-songwriters as a contribution to the revitalization of the Protest song in the Catalan-speaking countries.

== Biography ==
Freixas started performing as a member of a Sant Sadurní d'Anoia based band called Pangea. They did mainly rock-song covers.

His first solo performance took place in January 2004 in Igualada. In April 2004, he performed alone for the second time and used the live recordings for the sampler.

Freixas' first album appeared a year later, in 2005: Set voltes rebel (Bullanga Records) (Seven Times a Rebel).

In 2005, together with members of the fairly well-known band called Inadaptats, Freixas created and performed a show to pay homage to the Valencian singer-songwriter Ovidi Montllor.

In 2006, Freixas uploaded a set of covers of international singer-songwriters including Silvio Rodríguez, Víctor Jara, Ovidi Montllor, Raimon, and Bob Marley, under the name of Les veus dels pobles lliures (The Voices of the Free Peoples).

The next two albums have a slightly more modern sound and include some pop-rock songs with a touch of electronic music: El camí cap a nosaltres (The Path Towards Us) (RGB Supports, 2007), and La mà dels qui t'esperen (The Hand of those who await you) (Temps Record, 2009).

The fourth album, Tocats pel foc (Touched by the fire) (Temps Record) appeared in 2012. It features a more live-like sound, with a significant presence of Acoustic guitars. Freixas described it as a homage to Manuel de Pedrolo.

In November 2013, Freixas published his first book: Paraules per a Gaeta (Words for Gaeta), thanks to the Publishing Cooperative Tigre de Paper.

Protesta, the fifth album appeared in May 2014: under two formats: a CD with unedited material and also a DVD of the concert marking a decade of performances. The concert had taken place just after the death of Freixas' father.

Freixas has so far performed over 1500 times. In 2015, he was awarded the Catalan Album of the Year Prize by the Radio Station Ràdio 4, as well as gaining popular recognition; he has won several Enderrock Awards including for Best DVD/Documentary.

The sixth of Freixas' albums, Proposta, was launched in 2017 when Freixas became a father.

In 2019 Freixas is presenting his seventh album: Festa Major.

Cesk Freixas has also contributed to several albums either cooperative or by other artists, such as Projecte Mut's 10 anys i bons, #paualpalau by Pau Alabajos, or En les nostres mans, by Andreu Valor.

== Political and cultural activities ==
Cesk Freixas is a member of two political organizations within the Catalan National Left: Candidatura d'Unitat Popular and Coordinadora Obrera Sindical. Cesk Freixas has also expressed his support to Palestinian activists, the Catalan culture and language, and tackling poverty among others.

His political engagement might explain why his concerts have attracted political criticism and allegedly boycott by Spanish Nationalists and Conservatives. In 2009, the Spanish Conservative Party and a Spanish Nationalist Party unsuccessfully tried to have his concert in Figueres cancelled.

Since 2005, he has worked in the production and organization of the Trobada de Cantautors dels Països Catalans, a Gathering or Meeting of Singer-songwriters from all over the Catalan-speaking Countries. Artists such as Quico Pi de la Serra, Jaume Arnella, Miquel Gil, Albert Fibla, Feliu Ventura, and Pau Alabajos have taken part.

In the elections to the Catalan Parliament Freixas has held symbolic responsibilities under the candidacy of CUP in 2012 and 2015. He has also contested or given active support to CUP in Local elections.

Since June 2016, Freixas has also appeared regularly in Catalunya Ràdio and is very active online.

== Discography ==
- 2004: Maqueta (self-edited)
- 2005: Set voltes rebel (Bullanga Records)
- 2006: Les veus dels pobles lliures (self-edited): cover album.
- 2007: El camí cap a nosaltres (RGB Supports)
- 2009: La mà dels qui t'esperen (Temps Record)
- 2012: Tocats pel foc (Temps Record)
- 2014: Protesta (Temps Record)
- 2017: Proposta (DMusical)
- 2019: Festa Major (u98)
- 2021: Memòria (u98)

== Books ==
- 2013: Paraules per a Gaeta (Tigre de Paper Edicions).
- 2016: Alè de taronja sencera (Tigre de Paper Edicions).
- 2020: El delta de les paraules.
- 2022: Llegendes i rondalles catalanes.
- 2022: Contes catalans d'avui i de sempre.

== Awards ==
- 2008: Enderrock Award Popular Vote Best Singer-Songwriter.
- 2010: Enderrock Award Popular Vote Best Singer-Songwriter.
- 2011: Enderrock Award Popular Vote Best Singer-Songwriter Live.
- 2013: Enderrock Award Popular Vote Best Singer-Songwriter, Best Album, and Best Live Singer-Songwriter Performance.
- 2015: Enderrock Award Popular Vote Best DVD/Documentary. Catalan Album of the Year according to Radio Station Ràdio 4.
- 2021: Language Associations Coordinator Joan Coromines National Award to people or organisations to work to defend, promote or normalise the Catalan language and culture.
