= Gisele Jackson =

American house music singer

Gisele Jackson is a house music singer known for international club hits "Me, Myself and I", "Make It on My Own", "Happy Feelings" and the Billboard charting No. 3 hit, "Love Commandments" (1997). The song was remixed by Danny Tenaglia, Loop Da Loop and Stonebridge and also found success in Europe, reaching No. 54 on the UK Singles Chart and No. 2 on the UK Dance Singles Chart in August 1997.

Jackson graduated from Howard University, performed in tours for a few years with Ray Charles and Donna Summer building her career from Brooklyn, New York City. Jackson appeared singing in the 1996 film The First Wives Club and has performed all over the world, including at the presidential inauguration of Bill Clinton. She has performed solo at Carnegie Hall, Madison Square Garden and Lincoln Center. She lent her voice to a worldwide commercial campaign by Johnnie Walker. She moved to Spain and toured with her 90-minute classic soul and disco show "JUMP!" throughout Europe, Scandinavia and the Middle East.
