= Pastora =

Spanish/Catalan electronic music group

Pastora are a Spanish electronic group from Barcelona, consisting of Dolo Beltrán (vocals), Caïm Riba Pastor (guitar, synthesisers and programming.) Pauet Riba Pastor (programming and visuals) was a member until 2017.

== Origins ==
After studying visual and digital arts and multimedia, the brothers Pauet and Caïm Riba Pastor formed the group as an audio-visual project in 1996. As a duo, they released the experimental electronic albums "Trip show audio visual tecno simfonic" (1998) and "Cosmossoma" (2000) with the latter featuring their father Pau Riba, a famous Catalan rock artist from the 1970s. However, neither album achieved commercial success.

In 2000, to strengthen the project, they added former professional actress Dolo Beltran as vocalist and songwriter and abandoned the experimental efforts in search of a more accessible sound.

== Breakthrough ==
The group achieved their breakthrough in 2004 with the track "Lola" reaching the Spanish top ten. The eponymous parent album "Pastora" achieved commercial success the following year, blending electronica, trip hop, Spanish guitars with techno beats. The album also contained the hits "Mirona", "Lunes" and "Mentira". Both the album and its follow-up earned the trio a gold record.

After a two-year gap, the group returned in 2006 with the album La Vida Moderna, a concept album backed by Pauet's striking and often psychedelic videos. The album earned the trio a 2006 Latin Grammy nomination for Best Alternative Music Album. The first single to be taken from the album was "Desolado" which reached number 1 on the Spanish radio playlists chart and also became the most requested song on Spanish music stations. 2008 saw the release of the "Circuitos de lujo" album which was seen as a change in musical direction from electronica to a more pop rock direction. Following a remix album, Pastora RMX ED, in 2009, the band returned in January 2011, with their fourth studio album featuring Dolo Beltran. The album Un viaje en noria, was described as "eclectic and fun, fusing electronic sounds with acoustic instruments."

== Split and Beltrán solo album ==
In May 2017, Beltrán released a solo album, Copilotos, and revealed that the Riba brothers had decided not to continue with the Pastora project.

== 2026 reunion ==
In 2026, Beltrán and Caïm Riba Pastor reformed the group as a duo and toured in Spain.

== Discography ==
Chart positions shown are for the Spanish charts.

=== Singles ===
- Lola, 2003 #13

=== Albums ===
- Pastora, 2003
- La vida moderna, 2005 #15
- Circuitos de lujo, 2008 #10
- Pastora RMX ED, 2009 #71
- Un viaje en noria, 2011 #5
- Una altra galàxia, 2012 #57

Pastora means shepherdess, the female counterpart of the Spanish term pastor. Pastores means a group of shepherds, male and female, who tend to their flock in the field. In the Bikol Region, this refers to the band of singers and dancers during the early and middle part of the 20th century who roamed the streets in colorful costumes and props spreading Christmas cheers in front of houses with their Spanish villacicos and their prepared song and dance program they called velada.
