= Gossos =

Spanish rock band

- Origin: Manresa, Barcelona, Spain
- Genres: Rock català, acoustic rock, pop
- Years active: 1993–present
- Members: Oriol Farré; Roger Farré; Juanjo Muñoz; Natxo Tarrés; Santi Serratosa
- Website: gossos.cat

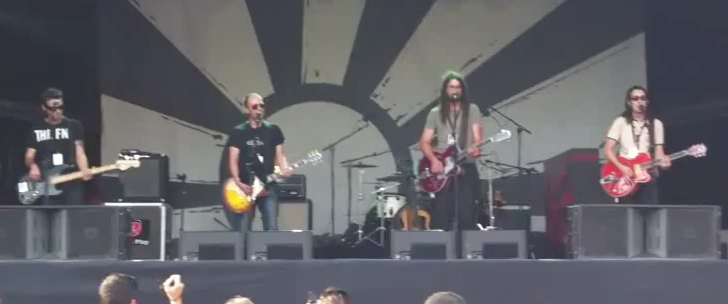
Gossos

Gossos ("Dogs" in Catalan) is a Spanish rock group from Manresa, Barcelona. Until 2002, their music stood out for being completely acoustic, with only guitars and bass. They later added drummer Santi Serratosa and began to electrify their sound.

== History ==
In the summer of 1993, Oriol Farré, Juanjo Muñoz, Natxo Tarrés and Roger Farré, all from Manresa decided to form a group to compose and write songs. After a few concerts, they entered two contests, and in the second they won the prize of having their first album produced. Their self-titled first album was released in 1994. Their acoustic style made them stand out from other Catalan rock groups of the era and they played an increasing number of concerts around Catalonia while preparing their second disc, En privat ("In Private"), released in 1996.

In 1997 they released their third album, Metamorfosi ("Metamorphosis"). The album cover does not include the title but rather an image of the four band members forming a Mandala. Their fourth album was the live disc Directament ("Directly", 1999), recorded at the Teatre Conservatori in their hometown of Manresa with guest appearances by Cris Juanico (Ja t'ho diré), Gerard Quintana (Sopa de Cabra) and Pemy Fortuny (Lax'n'Busto). In 2000 they decided to make an album in Spanish, De viaje ("On Holiday"), recorded in Madrid. The group then returned to recording in Catalan with their sixth release, Cares ("Faces", 2001).

In 2002 the group left behind the acoustic sound that had characterized their music and decided to incorporate electric guitars and a drummer. Their seventh album, El jardí del temps ("The Garden of Time", 2003), featured the group's new sound. They followed it with 8 (2005) and Oxigen ("Oxygen", 2007). The latter album included the group's best-known song, "Corren" ("They run"), which features Dani Macaco.

In 2008, Gossos celebrated their 15th anniversary with a concert in Barcelona and also played in the Netherlands and Germany. With the singer Berta, they wrote and recorded music for the TV3 show Ventdelplà.

Gossos' tenth album, Dia 1 ("Day 1"), was released in 2010. In the fall of 2011, the group announced they would be taking a break from touring in 2012, with the intention of presenting a new album in 2013. In April of that year they released Batecs ("Beats"), which contained the song "Res tornarà a ser igual" ("Nothing will be the same again"), the second in their series Polseres Vermelles ("Red Bracelets").

In 2015 they presented the tour 22 in which they played in the round. Afterwards they released the album, Zenit ("Zenith"), in which they displayed the full range of styles they had progressed through in the course of their career. In 2018, after playing a tour which included special 25th anniversary concerts in the Barcelona Auditorium (recorded live and released under the title Paraules que no s'esborren, imatges que no se'n van ("Words that won't be erased, images that won't go away")) and their hometown of Manresa, they announced that, although not breaking up, they would go on indefinite break.

== Members ==
- Natxo Tarrés - vocals and guitar
- Roger Farré - vocals and bass
- Juanjo Muñoz - vocals and guitar
- Oriol Farré - vocals and guitar
- Santi Serratosa - drums (since 2002)

== Discography ==
- Gossos (1994)
- En privat (1996)
- (Mandala) Metamorfosi (1997)
- Directament (Live) (1998)
- De viaje (2000)
- Cares (2001)
- El jardí del temps (2003)
- A L'Espai (Live) (2003)
- 8 (2005)
- Oxigen (2007)
- A L'Auditori - 15 Anys (Live) (2008)
- Dia 1 (2010)
- Batecs (2013)
- Zenit (2016)
