= Arnau Tordera i Prat =

Catalan composer and guitarist

Arnau Tordera
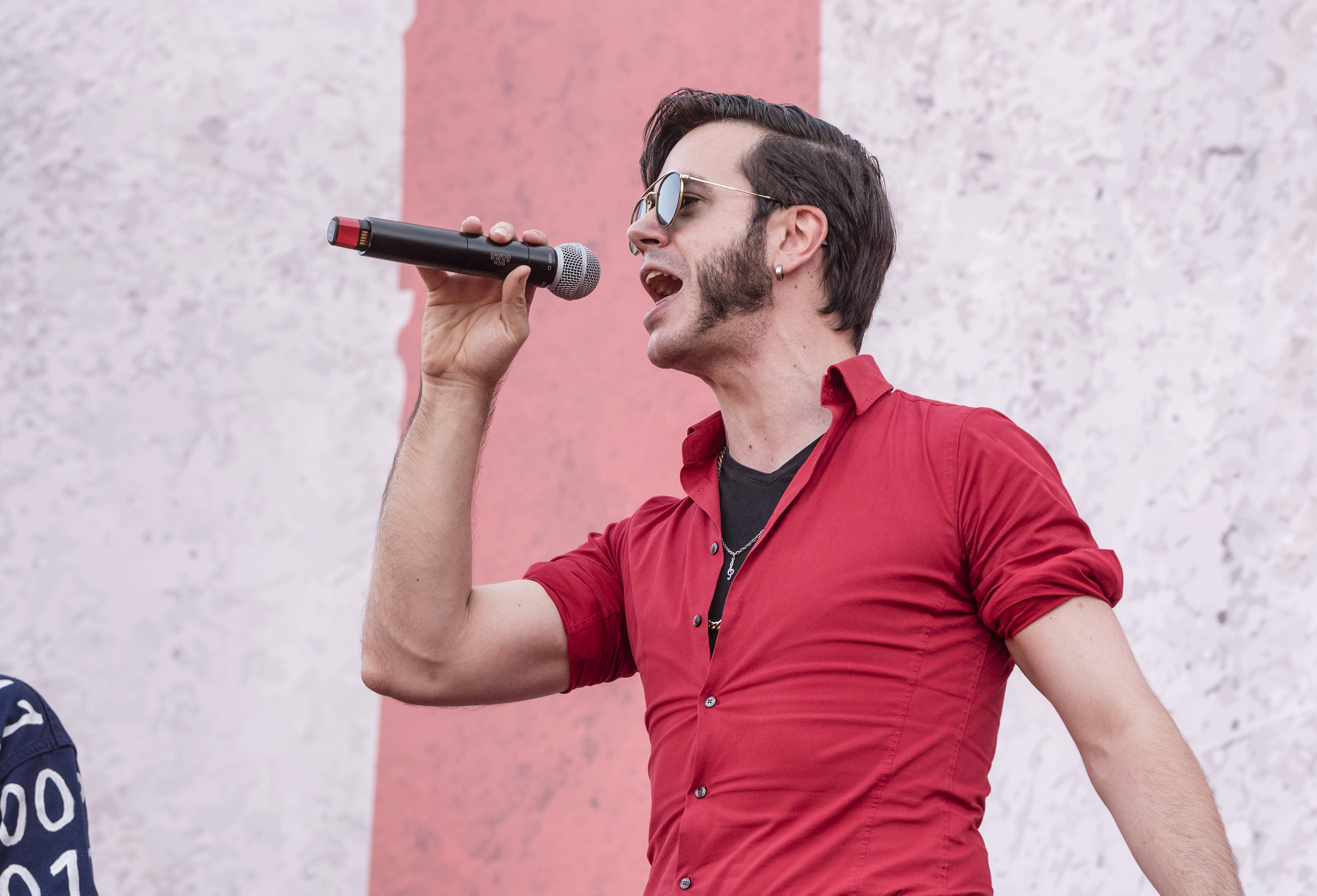
- Born: Arnau Tordera i Prat; 1986 (age 39–40); Tona, Osona, Catalonia
- Occupations: Composer, guitarist, singer, actor
- Known for: Lead vocalist and guitarist of Obeses

Arnau Tordera i Prat (born 1986 in Tona, Osona), also known by his stage name Arnau Tordera I, is a Catalan composer, guitarist, singer and actor. He is best known as the guitarist, lead vocalist and leader of the band Obeses.

== Biography ==
Tordera holds a degree in philosophy from the UAB. He studied composition at the ESMUC, modern music at the Taller de Músics in Barcelona, and classical guitar at the Conservatori de Vic.

In 2002 he founded the metal band Segle XIII, which became part of the Catalan progressive metal scene. With Obeses he has released the albums Obesisme Il·lustrat (2011), Zel (2013), Monstres i Princeses (2015), Verdaguer, ombres i maduixes (2017) and Fills de les estrelles (2018). His graduation project at ESMUC was the show Obeses 3D, which also served as the presentation of Monstres i Princeses, performed together with the Banda Municipal de Barcelona.

In his compositions, Tordera seeks to give equal importance to the meaning and the aesthetics of the song, resulting in stylistic diversity, refined elaborations, and a constant antagonism that reflects his different approach to music.

As a composer, Tordera has arranged works for theatre and film. Since 2011, he has been a contributor to the opinion section of Osona.com, where he offers critical reflections on the musical and artistic landscape in Catalonia. In 2014, he performed at the opening ceremony of the Tricentennial of 1714 with a version of El cant dels ocells. From 16 April to 17 May 2015 he played the role of Guillaume the waiter in Friedrich Dürrenmatt's Frank V at the Teatre Lliure, directed by Josep Maria Mestres. On September 10, 2016 he performed at the official ceremony of the National Day of Catalonia with Lluís Llach's song Venim del nord, venim del sud.

He hosts the radio segment El Secret de l'èxit on El món a RAC1 and presents the TV3 programme El bolo.

In 2022, he co-created the opera La gata perduda with librettist Victoria Szpunberg, staged at the Gran Teatre del Liceu in Barcelona, involving more than 400 local residents from the Raval district.

== Other projects ==
- El joglar (2023): a voice and guitar project setting poems by Jacint Verdaguer to music, in homage to medieval troubadours.
- Sardana Superstar (2023–): a contemporary reinterpretation of the traditional Sardana, premiered at the Temporada Alta Festival, later performed at the Fira Mediterrània and Teatre Condal in Barcelona as part of the Grec Festival (2–6 July 2025). The show combines sardana music with dystopian futurism and has been described as appealing both to those who love and those who dislike sardanes.
- Deixa't estar de romanços! (2023): a musical theatre piece created with young people from Osona as part of the project Fem un musical.
- La màquina del temps (2019): a children's cantata with the Secretariat de Corals Infantils de Catalunya, winner of the Premi Anselm Clavé.

== Recent projects and performances (2024–2025) ==
- La Renaixença (2025–): Tordera is part of the presenting and content team of *La Renaixença*, a new transmedia programme led by Peyu. It launched on 1 September 2025 and combines humour, culture and language. It is broadcast daily at 12:15 on Catalunya Ràdio, with audio/video versions on the 3Cat platform, and evenings on Canal 33.
- La gata perduda suite version (2025): The opera *La gata perduda* has been adapted into a suite for orchestra, soloists and choir and has been performed in Vic, Tarragona, Barcelona and Manresa with El Cor Canta, OSTO and soloists Anna Capmany, Mar Esteve, Joan Mas and Albert Cabero.
- Arnau Tordera Symphonic (2025): Among his large-format works are *Ovnis a Montserrat* and *Una veu feta de mil veus*, premiered with the Orquestra Simfònica del Vallès, Palau Vincles choirs and the Girls' Choir of the Orfeó Català at the Palau de la Música.
- In an April 2025 interview, Tordera declared: “If I were to die, Catalonia would lose a singular artistic piece that it is not capable of losing,” emphasising his view on culture’s role in national identity.

== Awards and recognition ==
- 3rd Premi Teresa Rebull (2018): for the project Les cançons seran sempre nostres, created with Magí Canyelles.
- Premi Rotllana (2019): awarded by the Federation of Sardana Associations of Lleida for his contribution to the diffusion of the sardana.
- Premi Anselm Clavé (2019): best musical production for La màquina del temps.
- Premi Capital de la Sardana (2021): for innovative initiatives, particularly his divulgative videos about sardanes.

== Discography ==
With Obeses

- Obesisme Il·lustrat (2011)
- Zel (2013)
- Monstres i Princeses (2015)
- Verdaguer, ombres i maduixes (2017)
- Fills de les estrelles (2018)

Solo and other projects

- La màquina del temps (2019), with the Secretariat de Corals Infantils de Catalunya.
- El joglar (2023)
- Sardana Superstar (2023–)
- Deixa't estar de romanços! (2023)
