= Marina Rossell =

Spanish singer in Catalan and Spanish (born 1954)

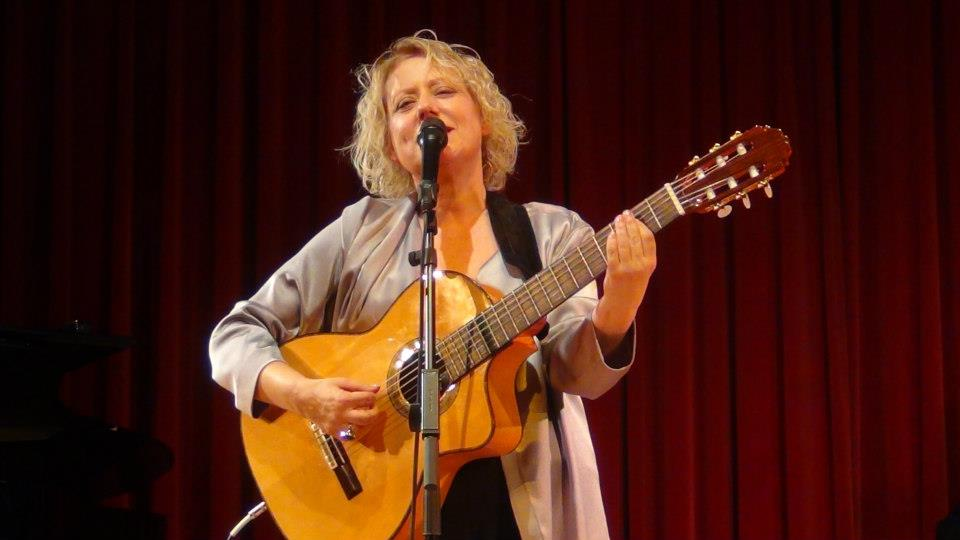
Marina Rossell

Marina Rossell i Figueras (born 17 January 1954 in Castellet i la Gornal,) is a Catalan singer who sings in Catalan and Spanish.

She's one of the most important singers in the modern Catalan language. She has sung traditional and revolutionary classical Catalan songs, habaneras and her own compositions.

Rossell has collaborated with such diverse artists as:Lluís Llach Georges Moustaki, Montserrat Caballé, Luis Eduardo Aute, Carlos Cano, Pedro Guerra or the flamenco guitarist Tomatito. She has made numerous tours by Europe, Latin America, northern Africa.

== Partial discography ==
- Penyora, 1978
- Cos meu recorda, 1982
- Barca del temps, 1985
- Cinema blau, 1990
- Marina, 1993
- Ha llovido, 1996
- Entre linies, 1997
- Y rodará el mundo, 2000
- Cap al cell, 2002
- Maritim, 2003
- Nadal, 2005
- Vistas al mar, 2006
- Sinfonía de mujeres (with Cristina del Valle and Rim Banna), 2007
- Clàssics catalans, 2007
- Marina Rossell al Liceu, DVD, 2008
- Inicis 1977-1990, 2011
- Marina Rossell canta Moustaki, 2011
