= Pontils =

- Municipality
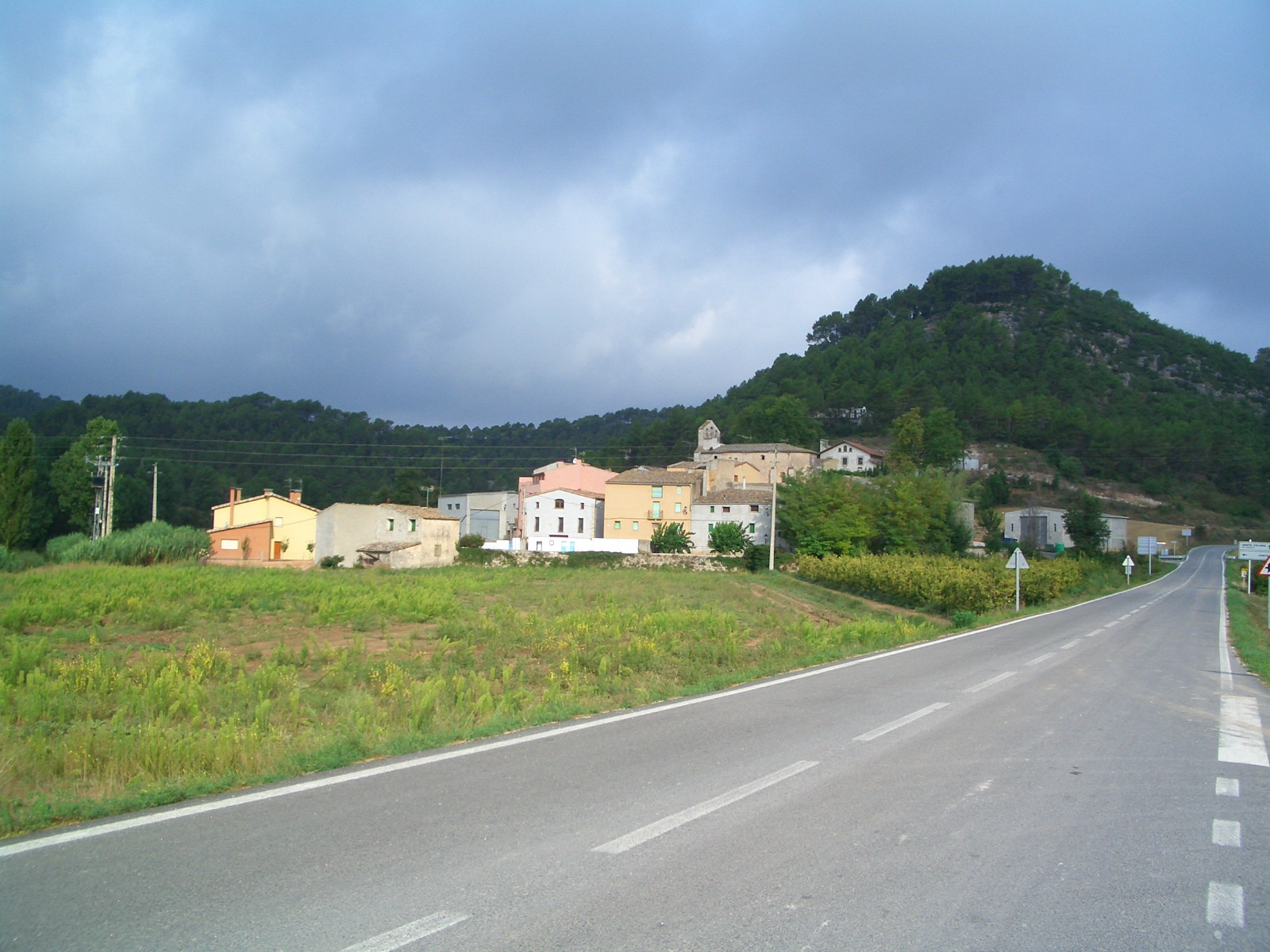

- Location in Catalonia
- Coordinates: 41.483°N 1.383°E
- Country: Spain
- Autonomous community: Catalonia
- Province: Tarragona
- Comarca: Conca de Barberà

Government
  - Mayor: Sara Janer Ferrando (2015)

Area
  - Total: 67.6 km^{2} (26.1 sq mi)
- Elevation: 511 m (1,677 ft)

Population (2025-01-01)
  - Total: 124
  - Density: 1.83/km^{2} (4.75/sq mi)
- Time zone: UTC+1 (CET)
  - Summer (DST): UTC+2 (CEST)
- Website: www.pontils.altanet.org

Pontils (Catalan pronunciation: [punˈtils]) is a village in the province of Tarragona and autonomous community of Catalonia, Spain. It has a population of 124 (register office, 2025).
