= Pau Alabajos =

Spanish politician

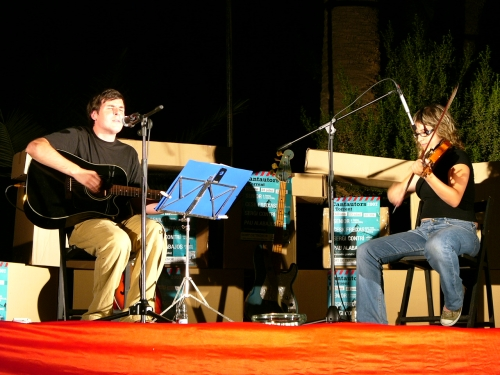

Background information
- Born: Pau Alabajos i Ferrer; Torrent, Valencian Country
- Genres: singer-songwriter; protest; folk; Nouvelle Chanson
- Occupations: Singer-songwriter, politician
- Years active: 2003–present

Pau Alabajos i Ferrer (born 1982 in Torrent, Horta Oest) is a Spanish singer-songwriter and politician. As of 2017 he has seven records. He is the current Secretary of the musicians and singers association in the Valencian Country Col•lectiu Ovidi Montllor (COM).

Since the 2015 local election he represents Compromís in the City Council of Torrent. The coalition holds a total of four seats.

== Career ==
Alabajos began his career performing on the streets of Valencia. His first record, Futur en venda (Future for Sale), was released in 2004. It included the song "Cançó Explícita" (Explicit Song) which won an award for its lyrics in 2006.

In 2008, his second album, Teoria del caos (Theory of chaos), was released.

In 2011, his third album, Una amable, una trista, una petita pàtria (a kind, sad, little homeland) was released.

Alabajos performed across Europe, the United States and other countries.

In September 2012, he celebrated ten years on stage with a concert at the Palau de la Música de València. He performed with an orchestra, artists and intellectuals from the Catalan Countries.

He released a live album in 2014: #PaualPalau.

In 2013, he presented a book/musical record called Pau Alabajos diu Mural del País Valencià de Vicent Andrés Estellés based on poems by the Valencian National poet from Burjassot.

One of the songs Alabajos created, based on a poem by Salvador Espriu, was chosen for the album launched in 2013 Amb música ho escoltaries potser millor ("With music you might listen to it better").

In 2016, he released L'amor i la ferocitat ("Love and ferocity"), recorded and produced in Nashville (Tennessee).

=== Politics ===
Alabajos is the Secretary of the Col•lectiu Ovidi Montllor, an association of Valencian singers and musicians. He is a local councillor in Torrent for Compromís and an activist who supports independence for the Catalan Countries and Palestine.

He took part in debates covering current affairs and wrote pieces for newspapers and magazines such as L'Accent, L'Avanç, L'informatiu, El Temps, Levante-EMV, El País, and VilaWeb). Alabajos has a degree in Catalan Philology.
