= La Llacuna =

- Municipality
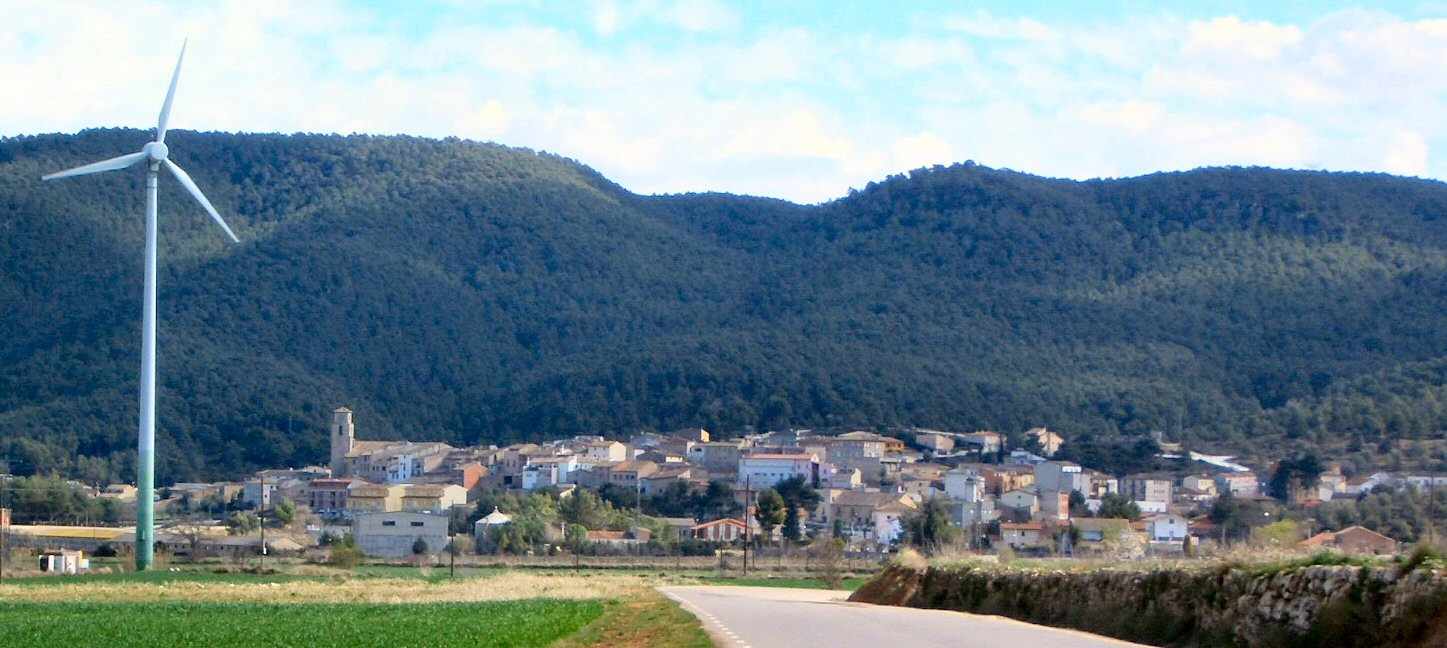
- La Llacuna

- Coat of arms

- Location in Catalonia La Llacuna (Spain)
- Coordinates: 41°28′27″N 1°32′3″E
- Country: Spain
- Community: Catalonia
- Province: Barcelona
- Comarca: Anoia

Government
  - Mayor: Josep Parera Tort (2015)

Area
  - Total: 52.2 km^{2} (20.2 sq mi)

Population (2025-01-01)
  - Total: 959
  - Density: 18.4/km^{2} (47.6/sq mi)
- Website: www.lallacuna.cat

La Llacuna (Catalan pronunciation: [lə ʎəˈkunə]) is a municipality of 884 inhabitants (2003), located in the comarca of Anoia, in the province of Barcelona, Catalonia, Spain.

It is a tourist town; nearby destinations include Igualada, the Vilafranca del Penedès wine route, and the Monastery of Montserrat.

== Geography ==
The town's altitude is 615 m, and the municipality has a surface area of 52,49 km².

== Annual events ==
Annual events include the Potada, whose date varies, but is usually in April; Aplec del Castell on the last Sunday of May; Fira de Sant Andreu on the first Sunday of December, and the pessebre vivent (living crib), a full-scale, live tableau of scenes from Bethlehem at the time of the birth of Jesus, on the second or third Sunday in December.

== Food ==
A local specialty is carquinyolis, a type of cookie.
