= Cap Roig Festival =

Annual music festival in Spain

- Genre: Various
- Dates: July - August
- Locations: Calella de Palafrugell, Spain
- Years active: 2001-present
- Attendance: James Blunt, Nile Rodgers, Sting, Luis Fonsi, Liam Gallager and The Vamps, various.
- Capacity: 2,118
- Website: Cap Roig Festival

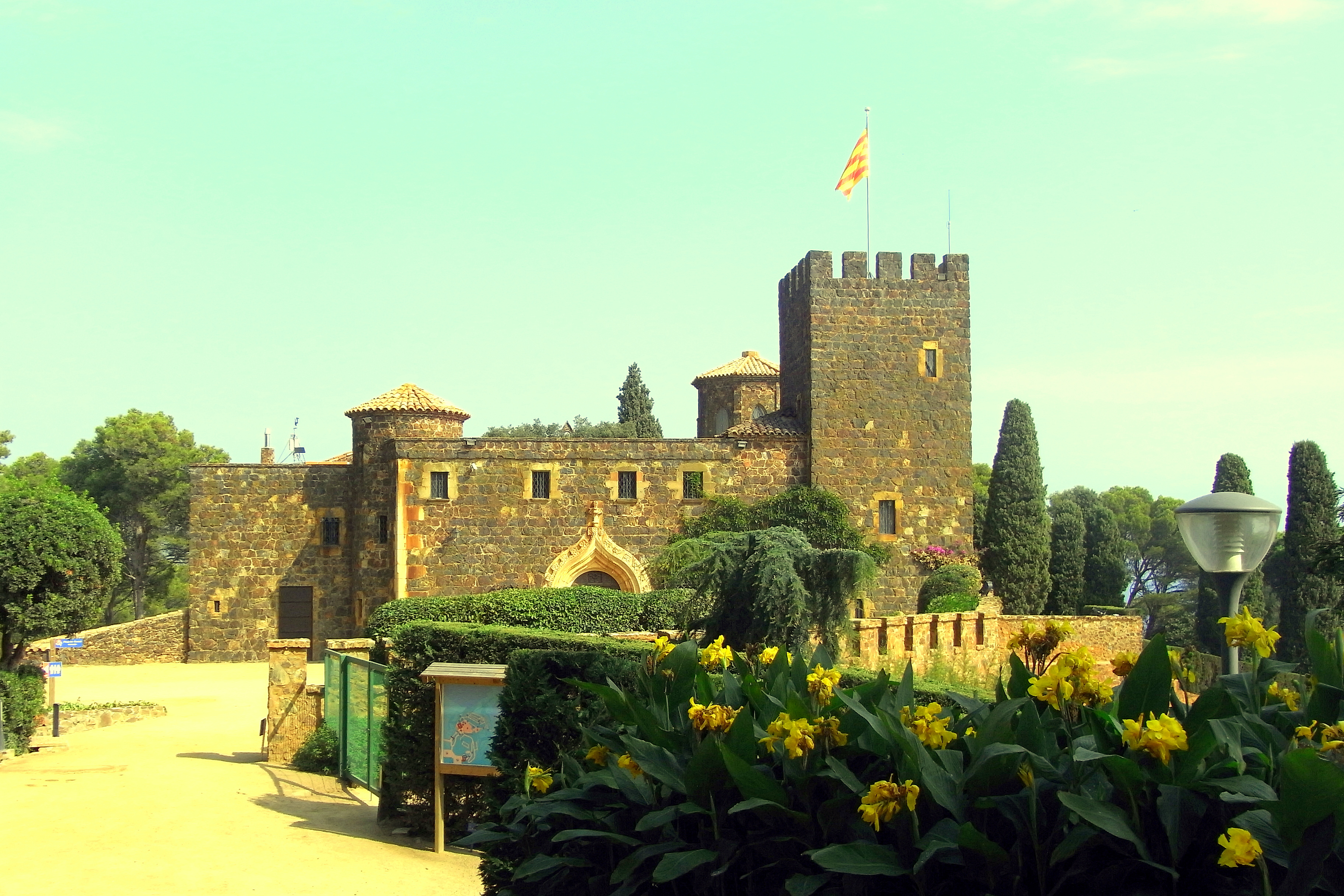
Cap Roig castle

The Cap Roig Festival is a music and dance festival held in the Cap Roig Gardens, located in Calella de Palafrugell, Catalonia, Spain. Since its inception in 2001, the festival has been celebrated annually, featuring a diverse lineup of national and international artists, such as Sting, Damien Rice and Andrea Bocelli.

The festival takes place on an open-air stage with a capacity of 2,118 seats. It is set within a 17-hectare natural area by the sea, adjacent to the gardens.

== History ==
The construction of the castle and the gardens began in 1931. It was designed and built by Nicolai Woevodsky and Dorothy Woevodsky.

As of 2001, the first edition of the festival began. The 17th edition, held in 2017, surpassed the previous attendance record with 46,316 viewers, which sold out 20 of the 27 scheduled concerts. The event generates over 15 million euros in revenue and creates 220 full-time summer jobs.

== Editions ==
Cap Roig Festival
| Edition | Artists |
| 2001 | - |
| 2002 | - |
| 2003 | - |
| 2004 | - |
| 2005 (16 July - 25 August) | Diana Ross, Woody Allen, José Carreras, Paco de Lucía, Noa, Ballet "Don Quijote", Susana Rinaldi, Madredeus, Ana y Víctor, Martirio y Chano, Igor Yebra, Sara Baras, Danza de "Romeo y Julieta", Pere i el Llop, Maceo Parker, Spirit of the Dance, Vallès Symphony Orchestra, Mélanie Hurel, Ricardo di Cosmo, Letizia Giuliani, Yat-Sen Chang |
| 2006 (6 July - 19 August) | Bob Dylan, José Carreras, Sara Baras, Dionne Warwick, George Benson, Diana Krall, Roberta Flack, American Gospel Singers, The Chieftains, Carlos Núñez, Gilberto Gil, Enrique Morente, Rosario, Russian traditional ballet Beriozka, Pink Floyd Ballet, Ballet of gala Nureyev, The opera by Carmen Bizet with Nancy Herrera, Los chicos del coro and Armando Manzanero |
| 2007 (13 July - 18 August) | José Carreras, The Blind Boys of Alabama, Chambao, The opera by Carmen Bizet with Nancy Herrera, Tamara Rojo, Enrique+Estrella Morente, Bobby McFerrin & Ferenc Snétberger trío, Lucie Silvas, Liza Minnelli, Joan Baez, Paul Anka, Salvatore Adamo, Elvis Costello & Allen Toussaint, Pat Metheny, Brad Mehldau, Jessye Norman |
| 2008 (11 July - 24 August) | Julio Iglesias, Return to Forever, Raimon, Franco Battiato, Pink Martini, Georges Moustaki, Ana y Víctor, Caetano Veloso, Paul Anka, Zarzuela in concert, Omara Portuondo, Kool & the Gang, Tamara Rojo, Chambao, Rosana, Joaquín Cortés, tribute to Maya Plisetskaya and Lorin Maazel |
| 2009 (5 July - 15 August) | Miguel Bosé, Michael Bolton, UB40, Facto delafé y las flores azules, Anastacia, Chic, Jamie Cullum, Raphael, Marina Rossell, Raimon, José Carreras, James Taylor, La Locomotora Negra+ Coral Sant Jordi, Sara Baras, Stars of lŽÒpera París, Paco Ibáñez, Luz Casal, Carlos Núñez, Julio Iglesias, Leonard Cohen |
| 2010 (2 July - 17 August) | Los Chicos del Coro+Els Virulets, Rufus Wainwright, The Beach Boys, Noa & Dorantes, Gotan Project+Guillamino, Youssou N'Dour, Màrius Carol, George Benson, Herbie Hancock, Rosana, Diana Krall, Sinéad O'Connor, Roger Hodgson, Antonio Orozco, Marlango, Julio Iglesias, Ainhoa Arteta, Sílvia Pérez Cruz, Macaco, Diego el Cigala, Pasión Vega, Charles Aznavour |
| 2011 (15 July - 21 August) | Chicago, Sting, B.B. King, Ana Belén, Manel, José Carreras, Roger Hodgson, Dúo Dinámico, Julio Iglesias, Antònia Font, Dani Martín, Miguel Ríos, La Fura dels Baus, David Bisbal, Raphael, Sílvia Pérez Cruz, Carlos Nuñez+Onca, Tamara Rojo, Tom Jones |
| 2012 (14 July - 18 August) | Bob Dylan, George Benson, Tony Bennett, Manolo García, Madeleine Peyroux, Els Amics de les Arts, Ben Harper, Kiri Te Kanawa, Paul Anka, Milow+Miquel Abras, Joaquín Cortés, James Morrison, Hombres G, Russian Red+Bigott, Miguel Bosé, Sergio Dalma, Chambao, Simple Minds, Mishima+Bremen, Rosario, Miguel Poveda, Bunbury, Alejandro Sanz |
| 2013 (20 July - 16 August) | Elton John, Manel, Diana Krall, SP3, Mark Knopfler, Vicente Amigo, Fito & Fitipaldis, Ainhoa Arteta, Keane+Pablo López, Melendi, Malú, Pablo Alborán, Antònia Font, Katie Melua, Gossos+Blaumut+Neus Mar, Rosario, Enrique Iglesias |
| 2014 (4 July - 15 August) | Elton John, SP3, Hombres G, Els Amics de les Arts, Geronimo Stilton, Placebo, Pet Shop Boys, David Bisbal, James Blunt, Duncan Dhu, Bryan Adams, Dani Martín, Luz Casal, La Iaia, Els Pets, Antonio Orozco, Geriona, DeuDeVeu, Sergio Dalma, Barbara Hendricks |
| 2015 (10 July - 17 August) | Sting, Ben Harper+The Innocent Criminals, Tony Bennett+Lady Gaga, James Arthur, Blaumut+Núria Graham, SP3, Rosario, Antonio Orozco, Gemeliers, Julieta Venegas, Miguel Bosé, Passenger, Els Amics de les Arts, Macaco, David Bustamante, Peppa Pig, Pablo Alborán, DeuDeVeu+In Crescendo, Joan Miquel Oliver+Mishima, Alejandro Sanz |
| 2016 (8 July - 17 August) | Manel, Rod Stewart, Rosario, Antonio Orozco, Carlos Santana, Super3, Kings of Convenience+Joan Dausà, Manuel Carrasco, Malú, Love of Lesbian, Sergio Dalma+Arte Final, Els Catarres, Amaral+Enric Verdaguer, Melendi, Ainhoa Arteta, Richard Ashcroft+Jacobo Serra, Alejandro Sanz, Tarzan el musical, The Corrs, Sopa de Cabra, Status Quo |
| 2017 (7 July - 22 August) | Wilco, Woody Allen, Anastacia, Passenger, The Pretenders, Blaumut+Paula Valls, Norah Jones+The Candles, Estopa, Sílvia Pérez Cruz, Melendi, Els Amics de les Arts, India Martínez, Alicia en el país de las maravillas, Luis Fonsi, Dani Martín, Iván Ferreiro+Ramon Mirabet, Sweet California, Miguel Bosé, Sidonie+La Iaia, Umberto Tozzi, Hombres G, Ben Harper, Andrea Bocelli, La sirenita, David Bisbal, Jason Derulo |
| 2018 (13 July - 22 August) | Luis Miguel, Bryan Ferry, Manolo García, Texas, Sting, Antonio Orozco, Luz Casal, Damien Rice, Maná, Jarabe de Palo, Juanes, Rosario, Joan Dausá, Mag Lari, James Blunt, Morat, Sergio Dalma, Els Catarres, Dámaris Gelabert, Macaco, Loquillo, Antonio José, Joan Baez, Hombres G, Taburete, Roger Hodgson, Pablo López, Andrea Bocelli |
| 2019 (12 July - 21 August) | Maluma, Nile Rodgers, Sting, Diana Krall, Silvia Pérez Cruz, Ben Harper, Liam Gallagher, Pastora Soler, Luis Fonsi, Rozalén, Jamie Cullum, Katie Mellua, Jorge Drexler, Taburete, Ramón Mirabet, The Vamps, Vanesa Martín, Álvaro Soler, David Bisbal, Morat, Aitana, Ara Marikilia, Ainhoa Arleta. |
