= Manel (band) =

Catalan musical group

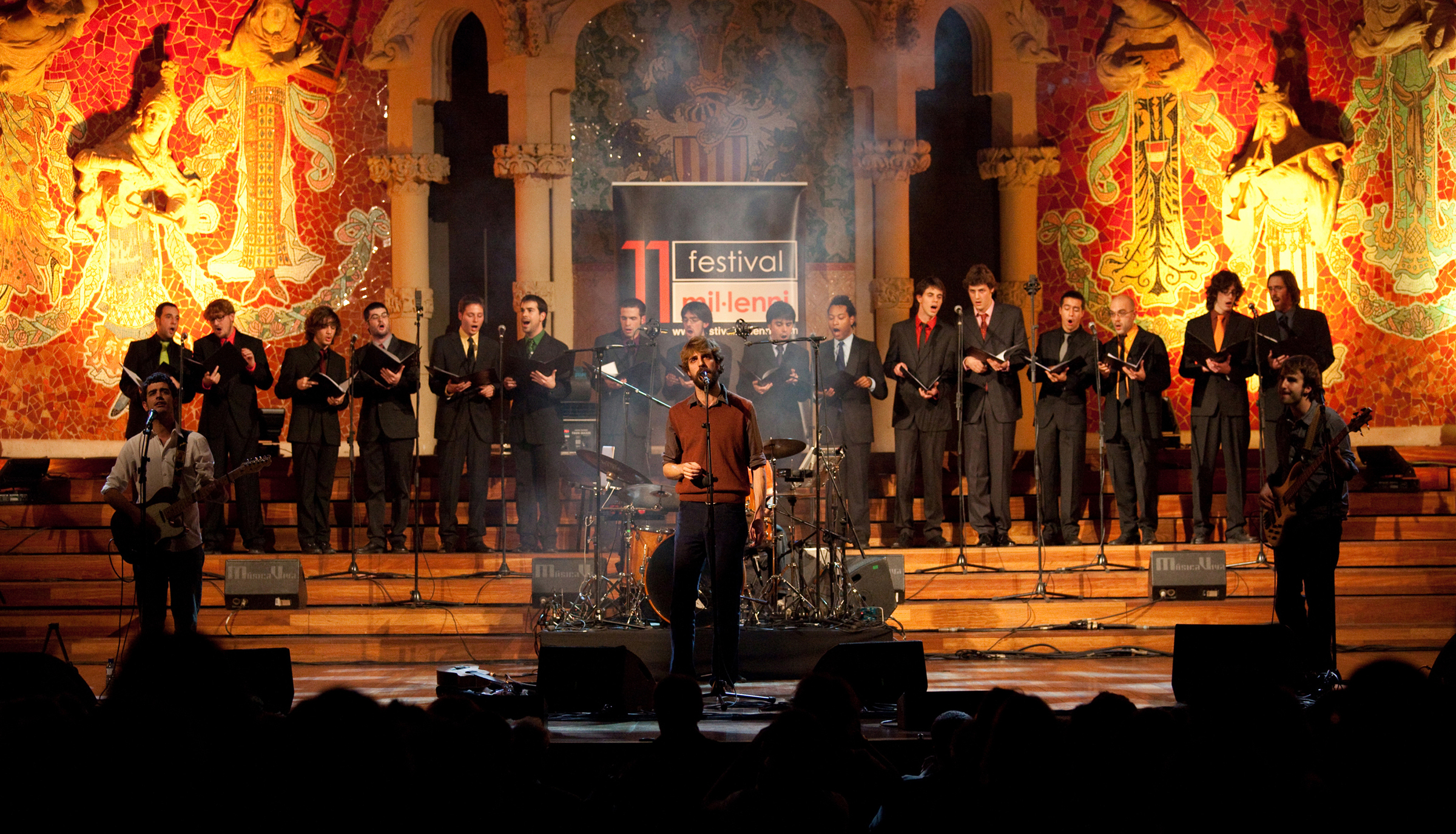
- Manel at the Palau de la música catalana in 2010

Background information
- Origin: Barcelona, Spain
- Genres: Pop; folk; indie
- Years active: 2007–2023
- Labels: Discmedi; Ceràmiques Guzmán
- Members: Arnau Vallvé; Martí Maymó; Roger Padilla; Guillem Gisbert
- Website: Official page

Manel was an indie pop band from Barcelona who sing in Catalan. They released their first album in 2008. They describe their musical style as a synthesis of pop and folk music. Critics have linked their style to that of other Catalan-speaking musicians such as Pau Riba, Jaume Sisa, and Antònia Font.

== History ==
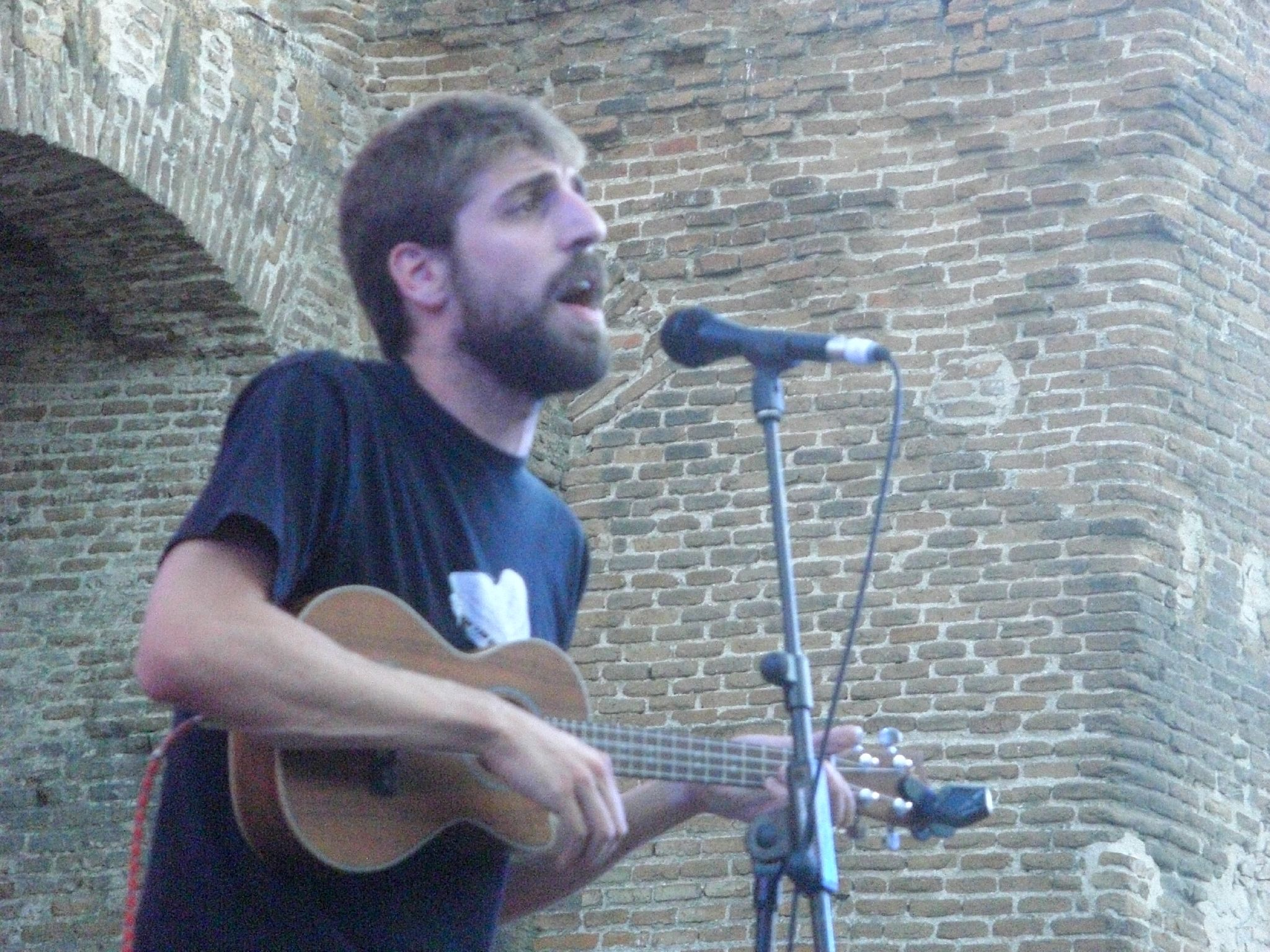
Guillem Gisbert.

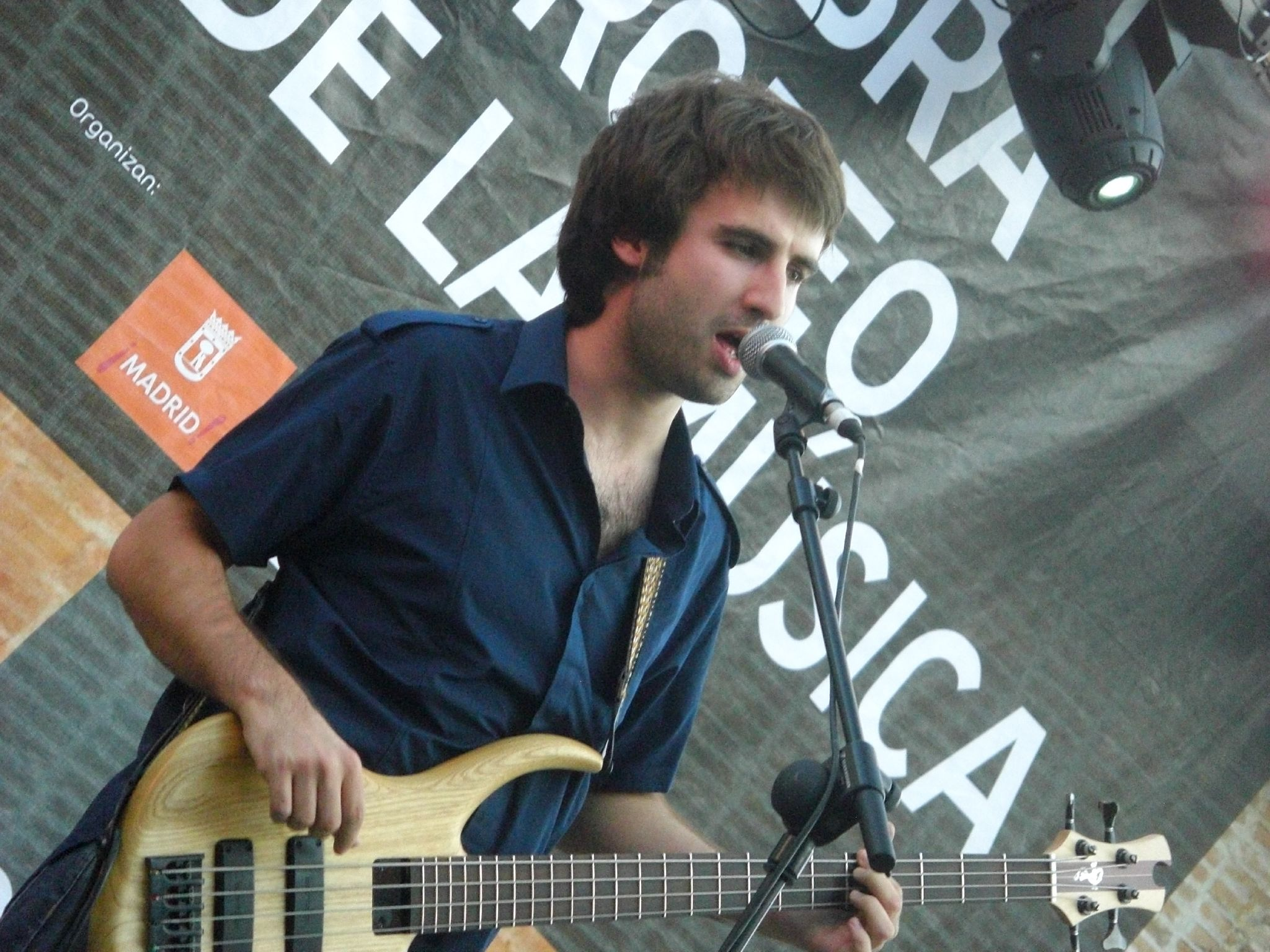
Martí Maymó.

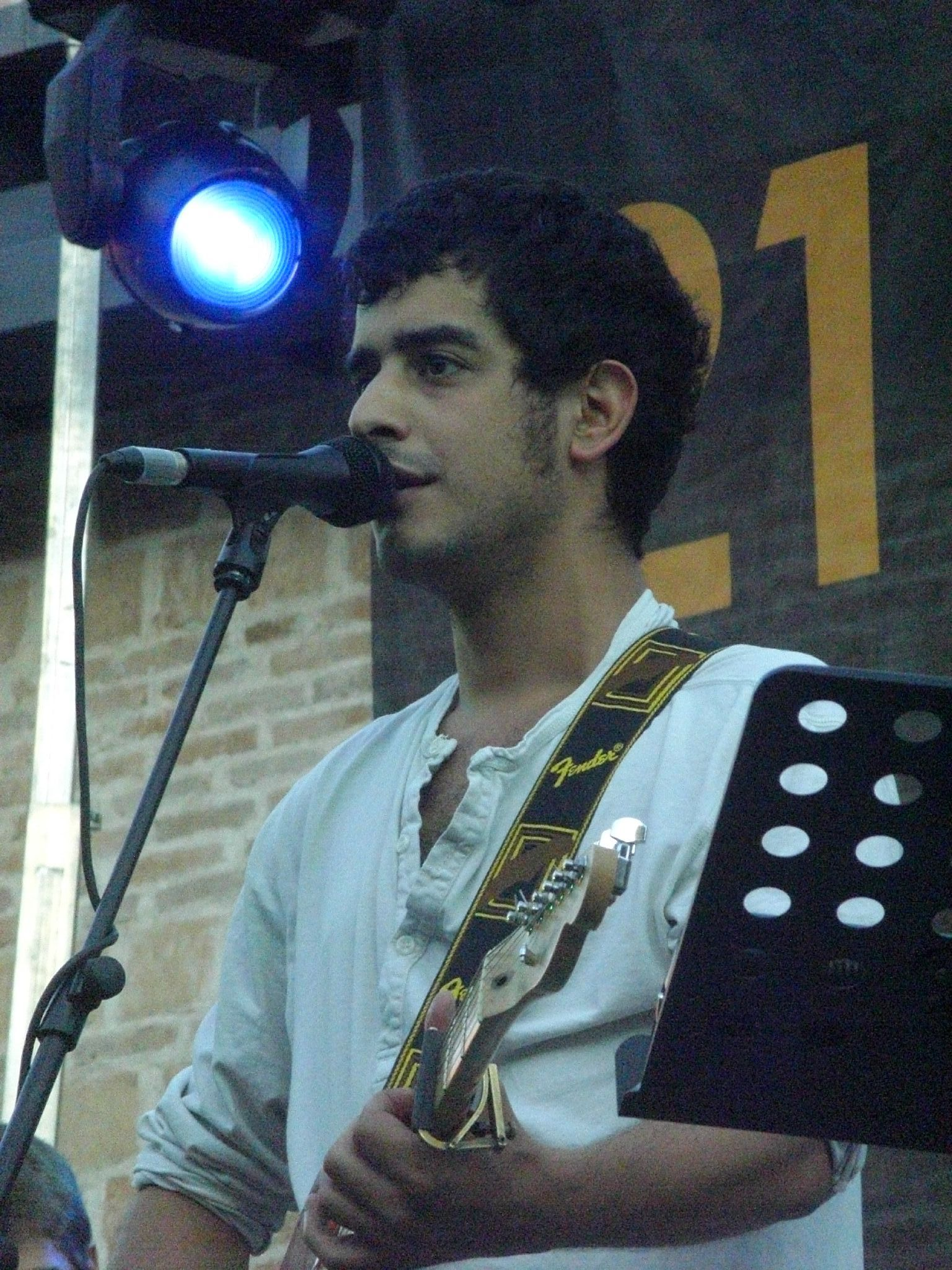
Roger Padilla.

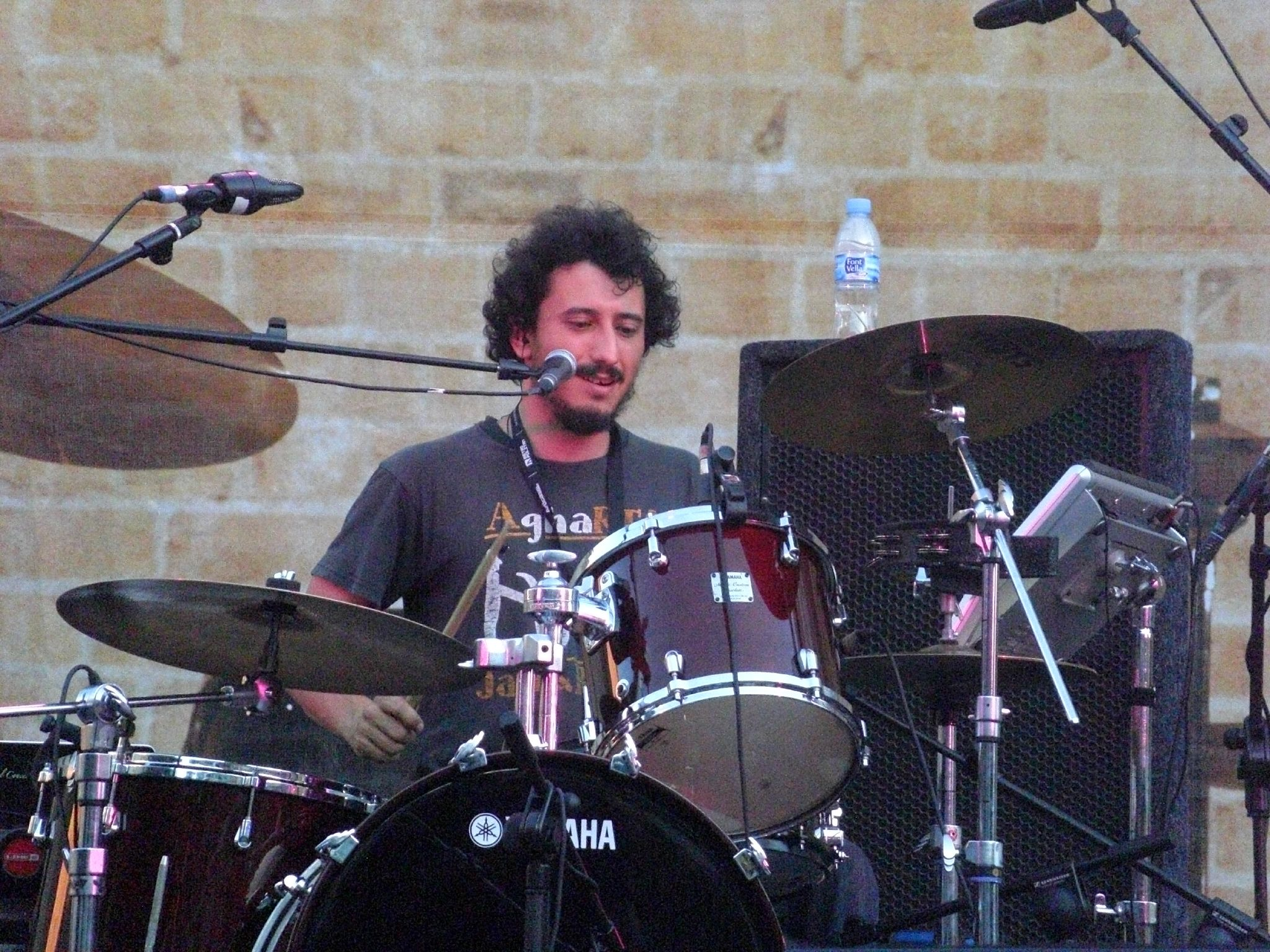
Arnau Vallvé.

The members of Manel met while attending Costa i Llobera school in Barcelona. They first came to public attention as finalists in the 2007 Sona9 music competition, in which they were awarded the Premi Joventut. With the prize money they were able to cover the production costs of their debut album,

=== Els millors professors europeus ===
Els millors professors europeus (The Best European Professors), whose title alludes to a lyric of the song Pla quinquennal. The album, recorded at Estudis Nòmada 57 between June and October 2007 and produced by Discmedi, was released the following year to critical acclaim.

The Catalan magazine Enderrock pronounced it the best pop-rock album of the year. In its issue of January 2009, Rockdelux described it as the third best Spanish album of the previous year, while the magazine MondoSonoro rated it the seventh-best.

The video for Dona estrangera, directed by Sergi Pérez, was awarded the prize for best video at the 2008 Cinemad festival.

Apart from the songs featured on Els millors professors europeus, the group's repertoire includes cover versions of No t'enyoro by Els Pets, La Tortura by Shakira, and Common People by Pulp.

It wasn't long until Manel became a sociocultural phenomenon in the Catalan-speaking world, giving rise to a considerable number of new Catalan-speaking pop groups, among whom, distinguished by the sales numbers they have achieved, are Els amics de les arts.

Els millors professors europeus went gold, selling more than 30 000 copies.

=== 10 milles per veure una bona armadura ===
Their second album, from which two songs (Aniversari and Boomerang) were released in February 2011, went on sale on 15 March 2011 titled 10 milles per veure una bona armadura. In ten days, it became the best-selling album in Spain. The title comes from a phrase pronounced by Kenneth Branagh in Much Ado about Nothing. In its first week, it sold more than 10,000 copies and reached number 1 on the CD sales chart in Spain, something which hadn't happened with a Catalan disc in more than 15 years. This second album was also released on vinyl.

=== Atletes, baixin de l'escenari ===
Manel's third studio album was Atletes, baixin de l'escenari (in English, Athletes, get off the stage), published by and distributed by Warner Music in CD, vinyl and digitally. The album was released on 16 April 2013. In its first week, the album reached number one on Promusicae billboards in Spain, selling more than 10,000 copies. The title refers to an incident at the 1992 Olympic Games where an announcer ordered a large number of dancing athletes to get off the stage as it was feared it would break.

=== Jo competeixo ===
On 1 March 2016, Manel announced through a press release the release of a fourth studio album, titled Jo competeixo, which was released on 8 April and consisted of eleven songs, recorded between November and December 2015.

=== Per la bona gent ===
On 12 September 2019, Manel announced the publication of their fifth studio album, titled Per la bona gent, which was released on 4 October and consisted of twelve songs. This work included collaborations with artists such as Jaume Sisa and María del Mar Bonet.

=== L'amant malalta and indefinite hiatus ===
On 11 March 2021, Manel released the single "L'amant malalta" ("The ill lover"). This was followed on 16 April by the release of a limited edition three-track EP, also titled L'amant malalta.

Two years later, in March 2023, Manel announced that they would be taking an indefinite break from performing together and that lead singer Guillem Gisbert would be pursuing solo projects. On 1 March 2024 he released the LP Balla la Masurca!.

== Members ==
- Arnau Vallvé: Vocals, percussion, and MIDI
- Martí Maymó: Vocals, bass guitar, contrabass, clarinet and sweet flute
- Roger Padilla: Vocals, guitar, banjo, melodica, mandola, ukulele and MIDI
- Guillem Gisbert: Main vocals, ukulele and guitar

== Discography ==
- Els millors professors europeus (2008)

No.	Title	Length
1.	"En la que el Bernat se't troba"	4:19
2.	"Avís per a navegants"	2:46
3.	"Ai, Dolors"	3:19
4.	"Pla quinquennal"	2:58
5.	"Roma"	3:45
6.	"Captatio benevolentiae"	4:19
7.	"Nit freda per ser abril"	4:21
8.	"Al mar!"	3:28
9.	"Els quapos són els raros"	3:38
10.	"Dona estrangera"	3:59
11.	"Ceràmiques Guzmán"	3:23
12.	"Corrandes de la parella estable"	7:15

- 10 milles per veure una bona armadura (2011)

No.	Title	Length
1.	"Benvolgut"	4:15
2.	"La cançó del soldadet"	3:57
3.	"El gran salt"	3:21
4.	"Boomerang"	5:07
5.	"La bola de cristall"	4:11
6.	"Aniversari"	4:29
7.	"Flor groga"	3:57
8.	"Criticarem les noves modes de pentinats"	6:06
9.	"El Miquel i L'Olga tornen"	3:39
10.	"Deixa-la, Toni, deixa-la"	6:22

- Atletes, baixin de l'escenari (2013)

No.	Title	Length
1.	"Ai, Yoko"	3:36
2.	"Vés, bruixot!"	4:10
3.	"Ja era fort"	2:59
4.	"Banda de rock"	3:08
5.	"Deixar-te un dia"	4:11
6.	"Mort d'un heroi romàntic"	5:26
7.	"Imagina't un nen"	2:35
8.	"Teresa Rampell"	5:30
9.	"A veure què en fem"	4:57
10.	"Desapareixíem lentament"	3:21
11.	"Quin dia feia, amics..."	3:59
12.	"Fes-me petons"	4:38
13.	"Un directiu em va acomiadar"	3:19

- Jo competeixo (2016)

No.	Title	Length
1.	"Les cosines"	4:18
2.	"Cançó del dubte"	3:42
3.	"Arriba l'alba a Sant Petersburg"	6:17
4.	"La serotonina"	4:13
5.	"Temptacions de Collserola"	5:39
6.	"M'hi vaig llançar"	3:40
7.	"L'espectre de Maria Antonieta"	3:11
8.	"BBVA"	5:45
9.	"Sabotage"	4:18
10.	"Avança, vianant"	5:38
11.	"Jo competeixo"	8:34

- Per la bona gent (2019)

== See also ==
- Music of Catalonia
