= Per la bona gent =

Studio album by Manel
- Released: 4 October 2019
- Length: 45:10
- Language: Catalan
- Label: Ceràmiques Guzmán
- Producer: Jake Aron

Manel chronology
Jo competeixo (2016)	Per la bona gent (2019)

Per la bona gent (English: For the good people) is the fifth album by Spanish indie pop band Manel, and their first to be released on their label Ceràmiques Guzmán. It was released on 4 October 2019 and produced by Jake Aron. Music videos were filmed for "Per la bona gent" and "Boy Band". The band toured in support of the album from November 2019. The album debuted at number one on the Spanish albums chart.

== Background ==
The band emphasised that each song was intended as a "small island" and disconnected from the rest of the album. On the album, they also began to incorporate the use of synthesizers and a "more electronic" sound, as well as to make extensive use of sampling—for example, the title track samples "Alenar" by Maria del Mar Bonet, and "Aquí tens el meu braç" samples "Vine a la festa" by Lluís Gavaldà.

== Critical reception ==
Professional ratings
Review scores
Source	Rating
El Periodico	4/5 stars
Mondosonoro	8/10

Joan S. Luna of Mondosonoro called the album "solid and remarkable" and noted the "ironic political connotations" of the title, writing that Manel's "lyrical and musical universe returns to throw splinters in very different directions" and that they have managed to find a new sound without "copying themselves". Writing for El Periodico, Juan Manuel Freire acclaimed the band's experimentation, noting that "there are injections of electronics, Latin stitching, a lot of rhythm diversity and imagination in the arrangements, but 'Per la bona gent' is really something else. Or twelve new things."

== Track listing ==
No.	Title	Length
1.	"Canvi de paradigma"	3:57
2.	"Per la bona gent"	3:50
3.	"Formigues"	5:13
4.	"Aquí tens el meu braç"	3:57
5.	"L'Adela i el marge"	2:04
6.	"Els entusiasmats"	4:03
7.	"Amb un ram de clamídies"	4:09
8.	"Les restes"	4:10
9.	"Tubs de ventilació"	2:31
10.	"Boy Band"	3:37
11.	"Les Estrelles"	5:17
12.	"El vell músic" (featuring Sisa)	2:22
Total length:		45:10

== Charts ==
=== Weekly charts ===
Weekly chart performance for Per la bona gent
Chart (2019)	Peak position
Spanish Albums (PROMUSICAE)	1

=== Year-end charts ===
Year-end chart performance for Per la bona gent
Chart (2019)	Position
Spanish Albums (PROMUSICAE)	76
