= Guillem Gisbert i Puig =

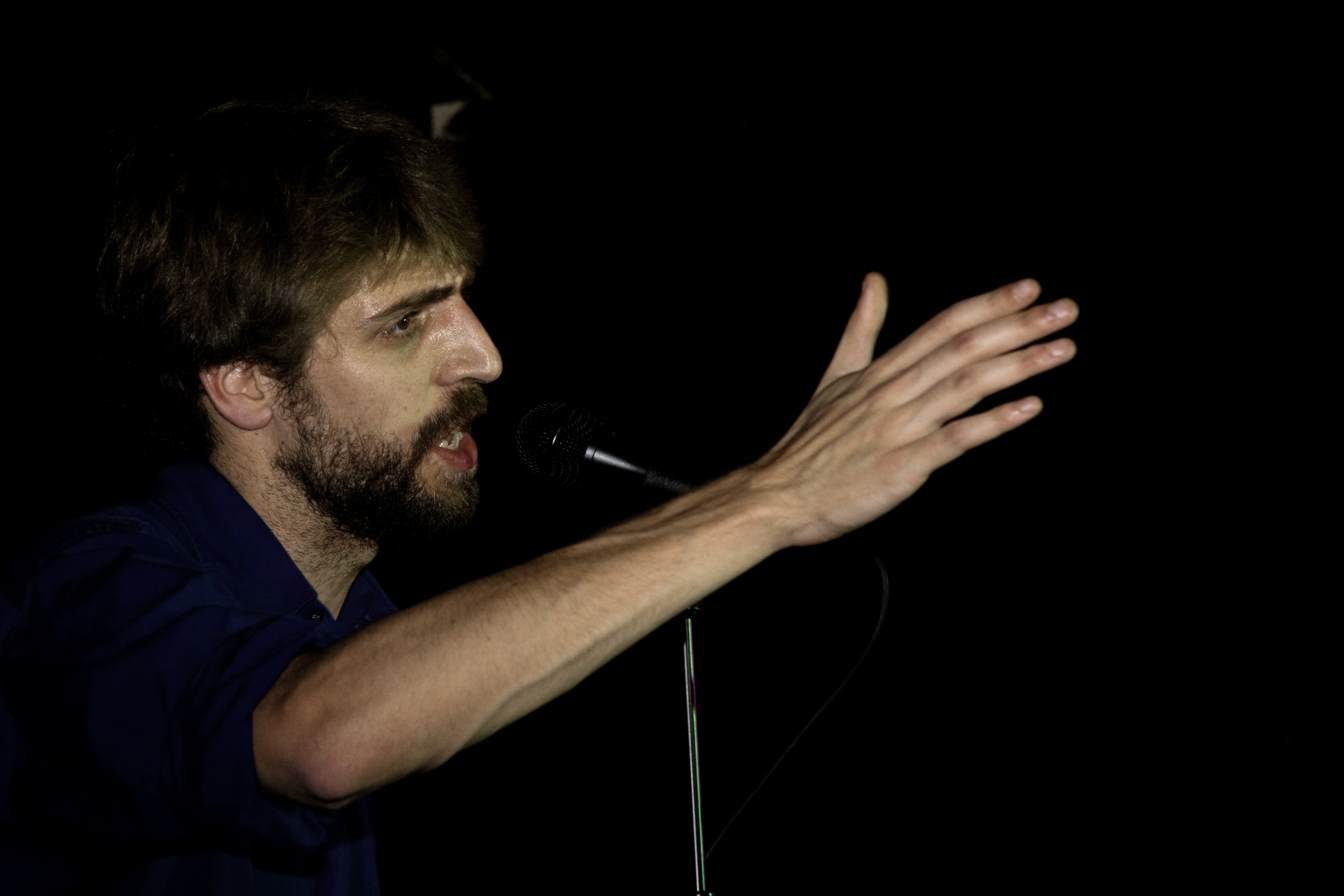
- València (abril 2009)
- Born: August 7, 1981 (age 44); Barcelona, Catalonia
- Occupations: Singer, songwriter
- Years active: 2007–present

Guillem Gisbert i Puig (Barcelona, 7 August 1981) is a Catalan-language singer who was a member of the musical group Manel. He wrote the lyrics for most of Manel's albums and is musical co-author on the majority of the songs. He plays guitar and the ukulele, an instrument that characterised his early career.

He studied at the Institut Costa i Llobera in Barcelona, later studied journalism at the Autonomous University of Barcelona, and worked in various publishing houses and as a cultural journalist before dedicating himself professionally to songcraft. He has also written articles in various media and served as a juror in a literary contest.

In 2023 the group Manel announced an indefinite halt to their activity, and subsequently Guillem Gisbert announced solo concerts in Barcelona and Girona He thus launched his solo career, which involved the release of the album «Balla la masurca!» on 1 March 2024.

== Discography (solo) ==
=== Singles ===
- «Les dues torres / Waltzing Matilda» (Ceràmiques Guzmán, 2023). Includes two songs produced by Jordi Casadesús and Anxo Ferreira respectively.

=== EP ===
- «Cantiga de Montse / Hauries hagut de venir» (Ceràmiques Guzmán, 2024). Contains two new songs produced by El Extintor and Jake Aron respectively, plus the previously released songs from «Les dues torres / Waltzing Matilda» (2023).
- «Un home realitzat» (Ceràmiques Guzmán, 2024). Presents the eponymous song, produced by Jordi Casadesús and premiered at the gala of the XVI Premis Gaudí; it also gathers previously released tracks from the 2023 and 2024 releases.

=== Albums ===
- «Balla la masurca!» (Ceràmiques Guzmán, 2024). Contains 11 songs produced by Jordi Casadesús, Anxo Ferreira, El Extintor, Jake Aron, Andreu Galofré, Pau Esteve, Roger Cassola, Gabriel Bosch and Joan Figueres. Includes the songs previously released in 2023 and 2024.

== Notes ==
- According to an interview in November 2023 he confirmed that Manel is on pause, not definitively disbanded: “We will make more albums and it won’t be in ten years.” - As of July 2025 he emphasised that the relationship between the Manel bandmates remains very good and that the solo phase is a new chapter.
