= Alicia en el país de las maravillas =

- Based on: Alice's Adventures in Wonderland and Through the Looking-Glass by Lewis Carroll
- Screenplay by: Eduardo Plá
- Directed by: Eduardo Plá
- Starring: Carlos Lorca; Evelyn Rodríguez; Marta Serrano; Mónica Von Reust; Ricardo Bouzas; Rubén Fraga
- Theme music composer: Gustavo Beytelman; Charly; García Enzo Gieco
- Country of origin: Argentina
- Original language: Spanish

Production
- Cinematography: Juan Carlos Siravegna
- Editor: Jorge Valencia
- Running time: 70 minutes

Alicia en el país de las maravillas (English: Alice in Wonderland) is an Argentinian live action 1976 Spanish language adaptation of Alice's Adventures in Wonderland.

== Cast ==
- Mónica Von Reust as Alice
- Carlos Lorca as White Rabbit
- Marta Serrano as Queen of Hearts
- Ricardo Bouzas as King of Hearts
- Evelyn Rodriguez as Duchess
- Nano Gruberg as Mad Hatter
- Rubén Fraga as Cheshire Cat
- Tina Write as Alice's Sister
- Raúl Indart Rougier as Dodo
- Ernesto Leal as Mouse
- Roberto Granados as Caterpillar
- Paulino Andrada as Gryphon
- Marta Larreina as Mock Turtle
- Eduardo Rosales as Fish Footman
- Sally Cutting as March Hare
- Angela Da Silva as Cook
- Bruno Llácer as Humpty Dumpty
