= Joan Miquel Oliver =

Spanish singer (born 1974)

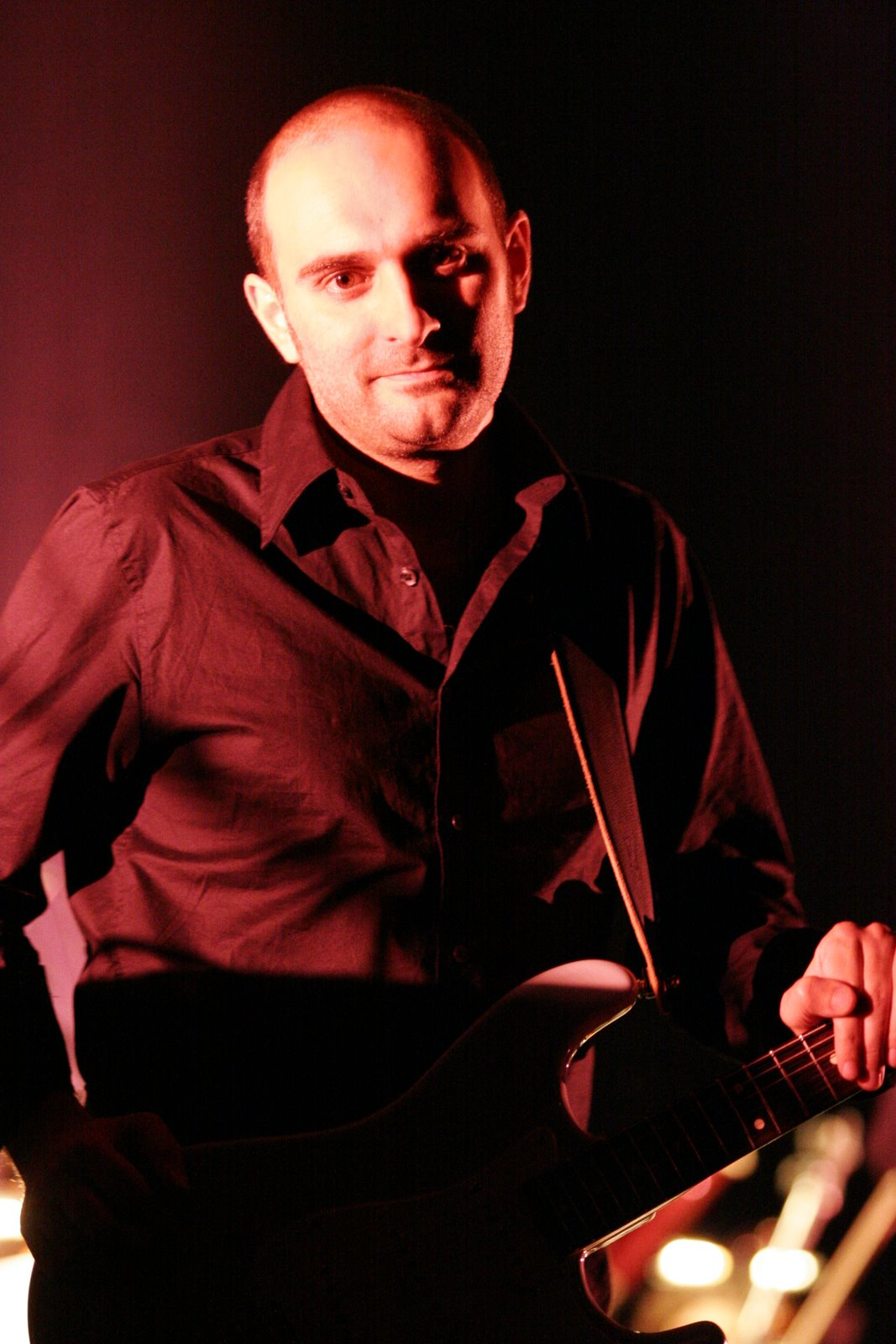
- Joan Miquel Oliver

Background information
- Born: Joan Miquel Oliver Ripoll; 1974 (age 51–52)
- Origin: Palma de Mallorca, Balearic Islands, Spain
- Genres: Pop, indie, lo-fi, electropop, experimental music
- Instruments: Vocals, guitar, others
- Years active: 1999 — present
- Label: Discmedi
- Formerly of: Antònia Font
- Website: Official site

Joan Miquel Oliver Ripoll (born 1974 in Sóller, Majorca) is a Majorcan musician who sings and writes songs in the Catalan language. As well as being the songwriter and guitarist of the group Antònia Font, he has also embarked on a solo musical career and has published a novel and a book of poetry.

== Discography ==
=== With Antònia Font ===
- Antònia Font (1999)
- A Rússia (2001)
- Alegria (2002)
- Taxi (2004)
- Batiscafo Katiuscas (2006)
- Coser i Cantar (2007)
- Lamparetes (2011)
- Vostè és aquí (2012)

=== Solo ===
- Droguería Esperança - Odissea 30 000 (2002)
- Joan Miquel Oliver - Surfistes en càmera lenta (2005)
- Joan Miquel Oliver - Live in Paris (2005)
- Joan Miquel Oliver - Sa núvia morta - Hansel i Gretel (single) (2007)
- Soundtrack of My Way (2008)
- Joan Miquel Oliver - Bombón Mallorquín (2009)
- Joan Miquel Oliver - Concert a París (false live with Albert Plà) (2011)
- Joan Miquel Oliver - Pegasus (2015)
- Joan Miquel Oliver - Atlantis (2017)
- Joan Miquel Oliver - Elektra (2018)

== Literary works ==
- Odissea trenta mil (poems), Palma de Mallorca, Lleonard Muntaner Editor, 2002.
- El misteri de l'amor (novel), Barcelona, Empúries, 2008.
- Un quilo d'invisible (theatre), Barcelona, Narrativa 433, Empúries, 2013.
- Setembre, octubre i novembre (novel), Barcelona, L'Altra Editorial, 2014.
