= Mishima (band) =

Catalan indie pop band

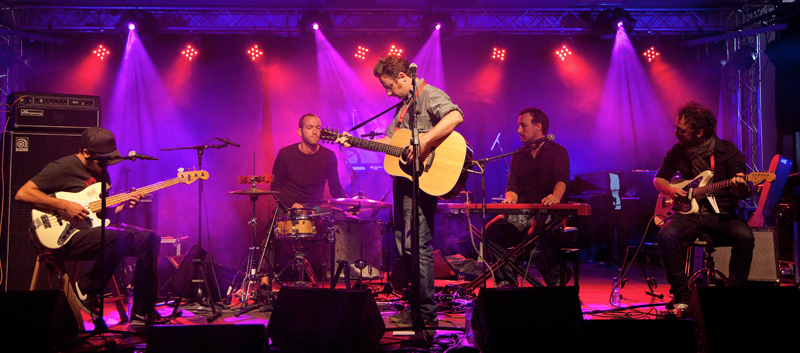
- Mishima, performing at Vic in 2009

Background information
- Origin: Barcelona, Catalonia, Spain
- Genre: Indie pop
- Years active: 1999–present
- Labels: Sones Records, Sinnamon Records, Discmedi Records, The Rest is Silence Records
- Members: David Carabén, Marc Lloret, Dani Vega, Xavi Caparrós, and Alfons Serra
- Website: www.mishima.cat

Mishima is a Catalan indie pop band from Barcelona, Spain. Formed in 1999, the band consists of David Carabén, Marc Lloret, Dani Vega, Xavi Caparrós, and Alfons Serra. The group's name refers to Japanese author Yukio Mishima.

Mishima's first two albums, recorded in English were well received by the critics, but their major success came in 2005, with the release of the third album, Trucar a casa. Recollir les fotos. Pagar la multa ("Call home. Pick up photos. Pay the fine"), in the Catalan language. Their subsequent albums have been in Catalan.

They released their fourth album in 2007. Titled Set tota la vida (Thirsty the whole life), it consists of nine stories written and sung by David Carabén. Spanish music magazine Rockdelux called it one of the best Spanish albums of the decade.

In 2010, their fifth album, Ordre i aventura (Order and adventure), was released in Barcelona. In 2011, they played at the Palau de la Música Catalana, a concert hall in Barcelona designated as a UNESCO World Heritage Site.

== Discography ==
=== Albums ===
- Lipstick traces (2000), The Rest Is Silence/Discmedi
- The fall of public man (2003), The Rest Is Silence/Discmedi
- Trucar a casa. Recollir les fotos. Pagar la multa (2005), Discmedi
- Set tota la vida (2007), Sinnamon
- Ordre i aventura (2010), Sones
- L'amor feliç (2012), The Rest Is Silence/Warner
- L'ànsia que cura (2014), The Rest Is Silence/Warner
- Ara i res (2017), The Rest Is Silence/Warner
- L'aigua clara (2022)

=== DVDs ===
- Palau (DVD + 2CDs) (2011)
