= Els Amics de les Arts =

Els amics de les arts
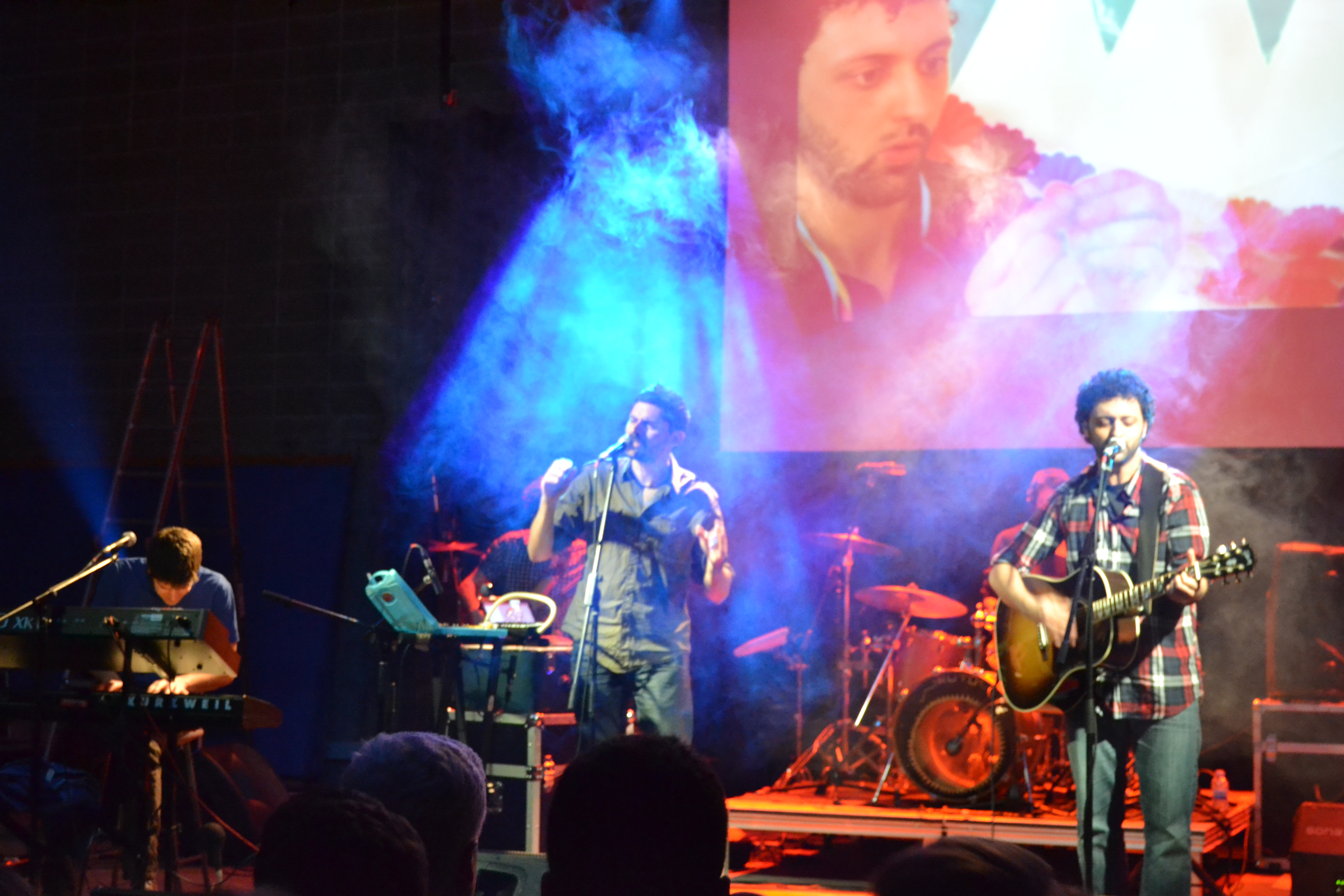
- Playing in Verges in 2011

Background information
- Origin: Barcelona, Catalonia
- Genres: Folk pop
- Years active: 2005–present
- Labels: Pistatxo Records, Discmedi
- Members: Dani Alegret; Joan Enric Barceló; Ferran Piqué
- Website: elsamicsdelesarts.cat and pistatxo.cat

Els Amics de les Arts is one of the best-known bands of what some have called the new wave of Catalan folk-pop. Their songs are short stories made with simple melodies, touches of electronic music, wordplay and much irony.

== History ==
Catalonautes (Pistatxo Records, 2005) was the band's first demo album. It contained their first four songs, recorded at home in one afternoon. This was the first and the last album they planned to make. However, as a result of feedback they decided to make a second demo.

Roulotte Polar (Pistatxo Records, 2006) was completed a year and a half later. They all went on an Erasmus exchange, each to a different place, but they wrote the songs together through Skype and recorded them in their winter holidays, in December 2007.

Castafiore Cabaret (Pistatxo Records, 2008) was the group's first recorded album, with six self-produced songs. They sent 8,000 copies to the magazine Enderrock and started making homemade videos: Déjà-vu and A vegades ("Sometimes"). They started the Castafiore Tour across Catalonia and their music spread by word of mouth. They considered, for the first time, recording a second album in a professional studio.

Bed&Breakfast (Discmedi, 2009) came out in 2009. They started touring, hiring five musicians for their gigs. The album has been awarded many prestigious prizes. It became a Double Gold Album (more than 45,000 copies sold) and spent 74 weeks among the top-selling albums. They rounded up the tour with a double concert at the Palau de la Música Catalana in Barcelona.

The new album Espècies per Catalogar (Discmedi, 2012) ("Species to be catalogued") represents a step forward both musically and lyrically. In the week of its release, the album reached number 1 in sales on iTunes and number 4 in the Spanish Promusicae Chart (Spain's official music chart). The twelve songs on the album are composed of melodies that blend organic instrumentation with electronic beats.

In March 2013, they were asked to write and produce the official song of the 2013 World Aquatics Championships being held in Barcelona.

In April 2014 they publish his third studio album "Només d'entrar hi ha sempre el dinosaure" (Discmedi, 2014). It definitely establishes them as one of the most important Catalan bands of the decade with unquestioned singles such as "Ja no ens passa" and "Preferiria no fer-ho". They tour around Catalonia, Spain, the UK and Ireland. They get their third Spanish Gold Record (more than 20.000 copies).

In 2015, to celebrate their tenth anniversary they performed three special shows in which they played with a Big Band. During their last concert they received on stage their first Platinum Record for the 45.000 copies of their debut album "Bed and Breakfast" (2009)

Currently, the band is composing new songs.

== Members ==
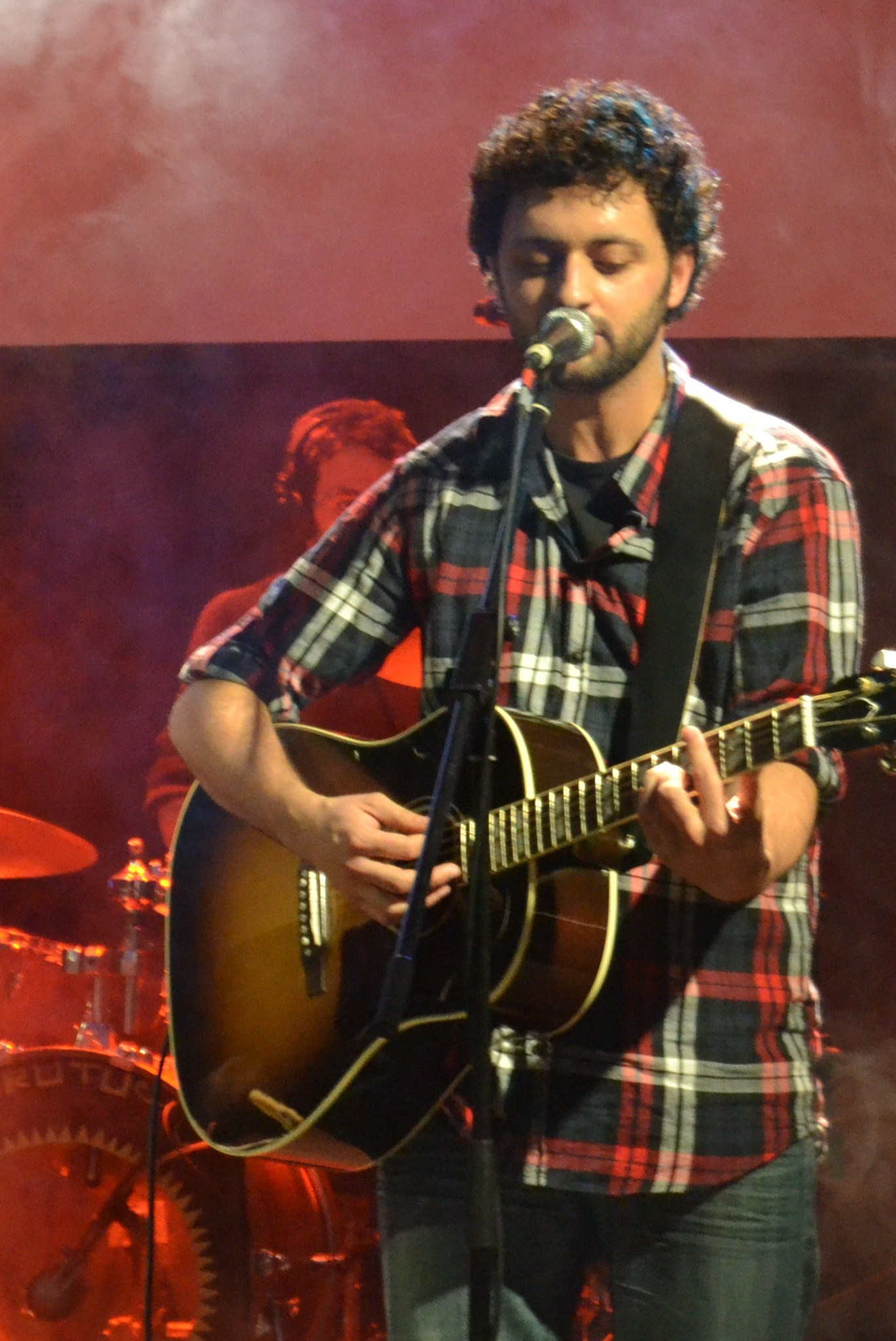
Joan Enric Barceló

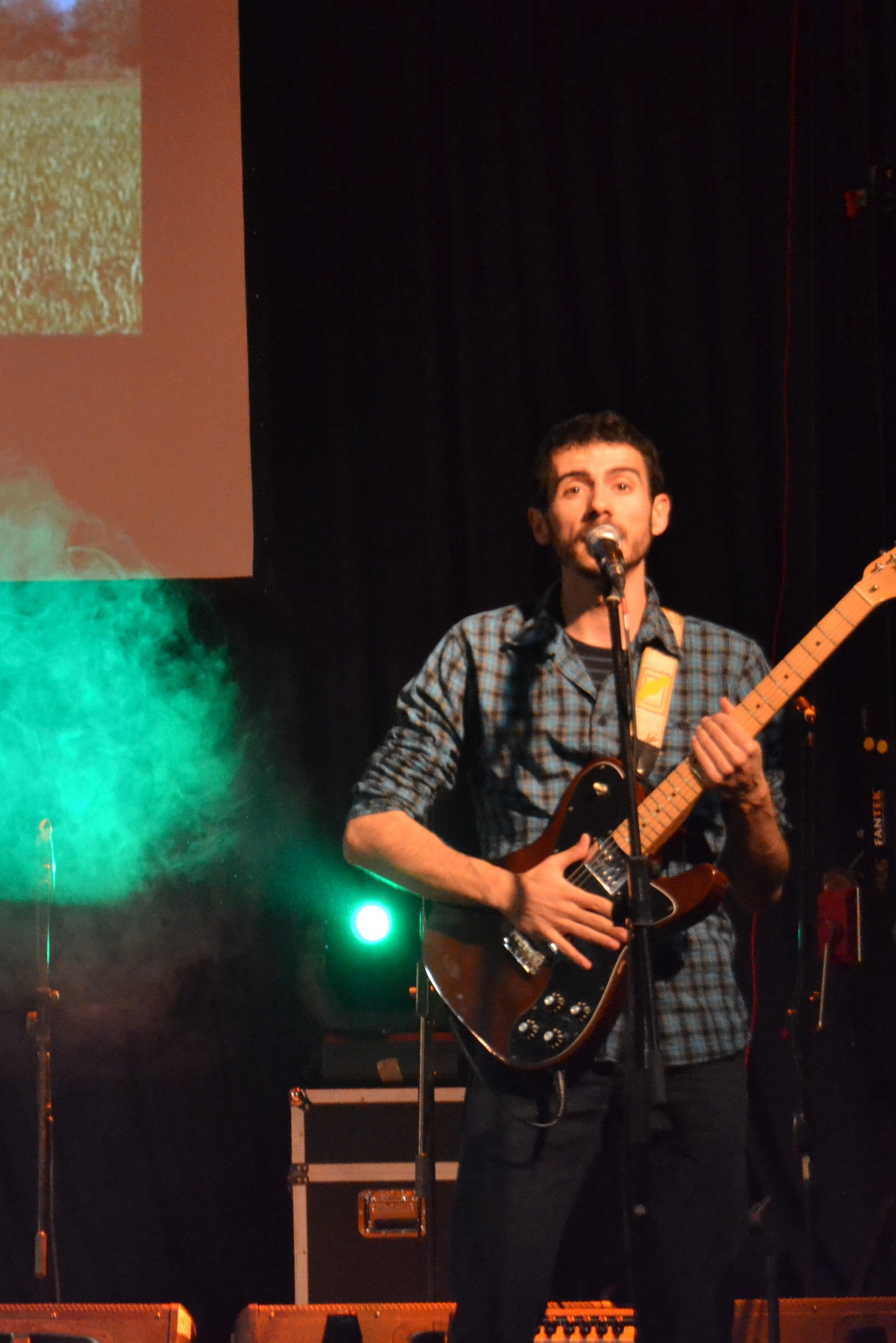
Ferran Piqué Fargas

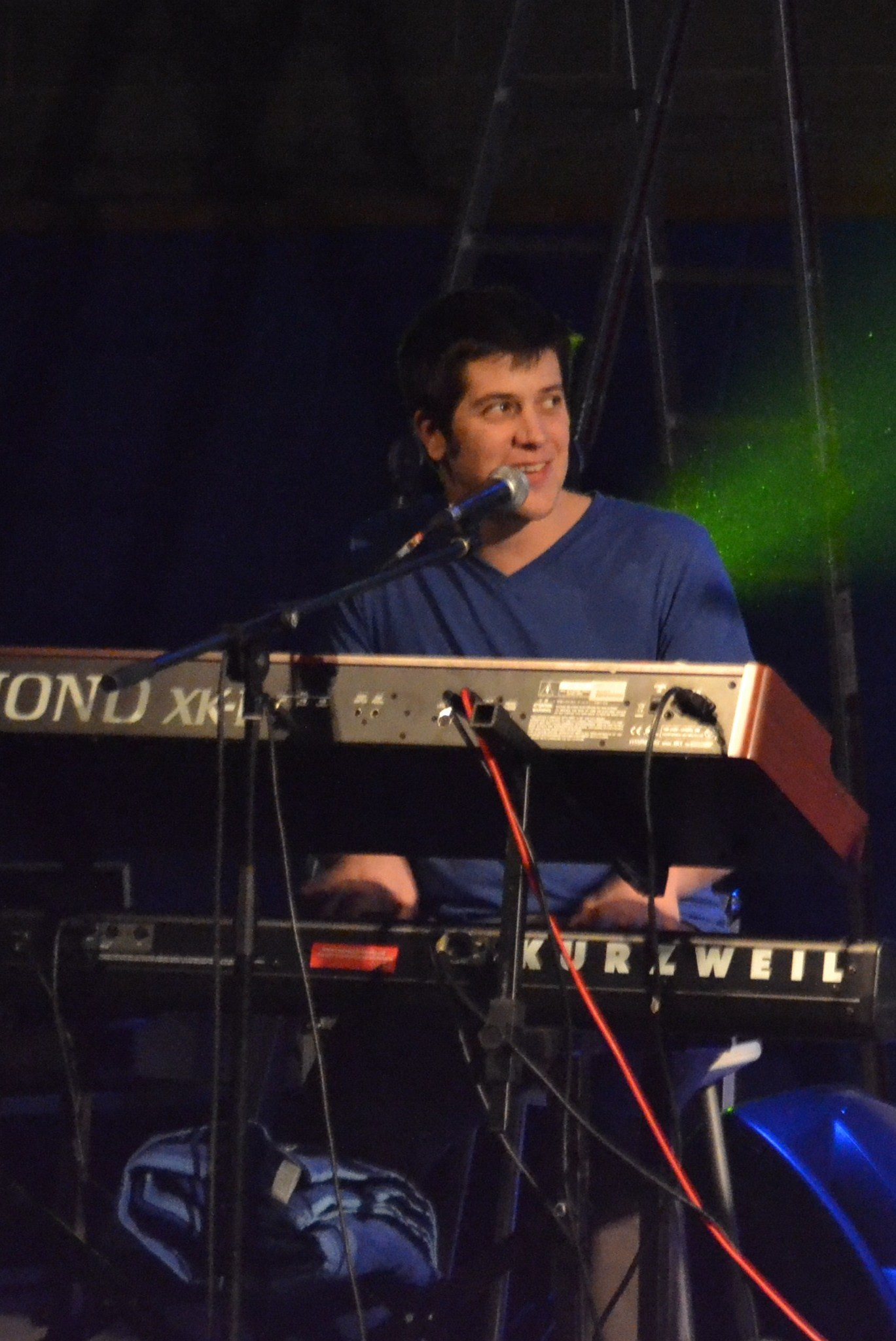
Dani Alegret Ruiz

=== Current members ===
- Joan Enric Barceló Fàbregas (2005–present): voice and acoustic guitar.
- Ferran Piqué Fargas (2005–present): voice and electric guitar.
- Dani Alegret Ruiz (2005–present): voice, piano and hammond organ.

=== Former members ===
- Eduard Costa (2005–2018): voice, melodica, moog synthesizer and xylophone.

== Discography ==
=== Studio albums ===
- Castafiore Cabaret (Pistatxo Records, 2008)
- Bed & Breakfast (Discmedi, 2009)
- Espècies per catalogar (Discmedi, 2012)
- Tenim dret a fer l'animal (CD+DVD live) (Discmedi, 2013)
- Només d'entrar hi ha sempre el dinosaure (Discmedi, 2014)
- La taula petita EP (Pistatxo Records / Clippers, 2015)
- 10 anys (CD+DVD Live) (Pistatxo Records, 2015)
- Un estrany poder (Sony, 2017)
- El senyal que esperaves (Música Global / Universal, 2020)
- Allà On Volia (Pistatxo Records, 2023)
- Les paraules que triem no dir (Pistatxo Records, 2024)
- 20 anys d'Amics (Pistatxo Records, 2025)

=== Demos ===
- Catalonautes (Pistatxo Records, 2005)
- Roulotte Polar (Pistatxo Records, 2007)

=== Special albums ===
- Càpsules Hoi-poi [Disc de rareses] (Pistatxo Records, 2009)
- Les mans plenes (Pistatxo Records, 2009) – Cooperation with the fanzine Malalletra
- Non-non (Pistatxo Records, 2009) – Cooperation with the fanzine Malalletra
- Submarí Pop. Tributo catalán a The Beatles (Grup Enderrock, 2010) – Compilation
- Bed & Breakfast Special Edition (Discmedi, 2010)

== Videos ==
- The city between blue and blue official song of the 15th FINA World Championships Barcelona 2013
- Monsieur Costeau official clip of his album Espècies per catalogar
- Making of Monsieur Costeau
- Microdocus. 16th European Balloon Festival Documentary series of the tour (1) Espècies per catalogar
- Microdocus. Cap Roig Festival Documentary series of the tour (2) Espècies per catalogar
- Microdocus. Grec Festival Documentary series of the tour (3) Espècies per catalogar
- Microdocus. Porta Ferrada Festival Documentary series of the tour (4) Espècies per catalogar
