= Big Brother: Reindeer Games =

American reality competition television series

- Also known as: Reindeer Games
- Genre: Reality competition
- Based on: Big Brother by John de Mol Jr.
- Presented by: Derek Xiao; Tiffany Mitchell; Jordan Lloyd
- Country of origin: United States
- Original language: English
- No. of seasons: 1
- No. of episodes: 6

Production
- Executive producers: Allison Grodner; Rich Meehan; Chris Roach
- Production companies: Our House Productions; Fly on the Wall Entertainment; Banijay Americas

Original release
- Network: CBS
- Release: December 11 – December 21, 2023

Related
- Big Brother

Big Brother: Reindeer Games (also known as Reindeer Games) is a reality competition television series and spin-off of the American version of Big Brother. It aired on CBS on December 11, 2023, to December 21, 2023, and hosted by former Big Brother HouseGuests Derek Xiao, Tiffany Mitchell, and Jordan Lloyd. The series features nine former Houseguests competing against each other across six episodes which aired over the course of two weeks. Big Brother: Reindeer Games was placed on hiatus in 2024, due to lack of scheduling availability on the network.

== House ==
The house used for Big Brother: Reindeer Games was renamed to the Santa's Lodge under the holiday-theme. The entryway of the house was decorated with flying reindeer, gold-wrapped presents, and a red flannel rug. The living room had a Christmas tree decorated with ornaments and wreaths. The kitchen, which in this season was named "Mrs. Claus Bakery", had red and green wallpaper with Christmas symbols, and gingerbread men on the counters.

== Format ==
Each episode consists of three games and ends in a "Santa's Showdown", the outcome of which determines the elimination of one HouseGuest. The players did not live in the Big Brother house or together, and there was no voting to evict other players. Four HouseGuest remained in the finale with one winning a $100,000 grand prize.

=== Format changes and additions ===
Unlike the previous seasons of Big Brother, Reindeer Games did not involve any nominations, house-voted evictions or live broadcasts. Instead, the nine houseguests from previous seasons would compete in a series of holiday-themed daily challenges.

==== Naughty and Nice Challenge ====
In this challenge, the houseguests would compete to gain an advantage for the next challenge, while simultaneously, giving a disadvantage for a houseguest of their choosing, also known as the Naughty List Punishment.

==== Jingle Bell Brawl Challenge ====
The winner, or winners, of this challenge, would receive safety from elimination.

==== Santa's Showdown ====
The nominees would compete against each other in various challenges to determine who would remain in the lodge and who would be eliminated from the game.

- The losing houseguest would get to choose a present under the Christmas tree that contains gifts from a fruit cake to $5,000.

=== Santa's gifts history ===
Episode	Eliminated HouseGuest	Santa's gift
1	Cameron	One-year Jelly of the Month Club subscription
2	Cody	Fruit cake
3	Danielle	$5,000
4	Josh	Ugly Christmas sweater
5	Britney	Pair of underwear and socks

== HouseGuests ==
The cast of Big Brother: Reindeer Games. L–R: Cody, Cameron, Britney, Josh, Nicole, Santa (host), Taylor, Danielle, Frankie, Derek (host), Tiffany (host), Jordan (host) and Xavier

The HouseGuests were revealed intermittently throughout December 6 and 7, 2023. The former HouseGuests were Nicole Franzel who was the 7th place finisher from Big Brother 16, the winner from Big Brother 18 and the 3rd place finisher from Big Brother 22: All-Stars, Taylor Hale who was the winner of Big Brother 24, the 5th place finisher from Big Brother 16, Frankie Grande who won Big Brother 23, Xavier Prather who was the 4th place finisher from Big Brother 12 and the 8th place finisher from Big Brother 14, Britney Haynes, who won Big Brother 19, Josh Martinez, the runner-up from Big Brother 3 and the 6th place finisher from Big Brother 7: All-Stars, Danielle Reyes who was the runner-up from Big Brother 16, Cody Calafiore who won Big Brother 22: All-Stars and Cameron Hardin who was the 9th place finisher and America's Favorite HouseGuest on Big Brother 25.

Name	Age	Occupation	Residence	Result
Nicole Franzel-Arroyo Big Brother 16, Big Brother 18 & Big Brother 22: All-Stars	31	Boutique owner	Ubly, Michigan	Winner; Episode 6
Taylor Hale Big Brother 24	28	Motivational speaker	Detroit, Michigan	Runner-up; Episode 6
Frankie Grande Big Brother 16 (Note: Frankie Grande also participated on the 18th series of Celebrity Big Brother UK.)	40	Actor	Los Angeles, California	Finalist; Episode 6
Xavier Prather Big Brother 23	29	Attorney	Milwaukee, Wisconsin	Finalist; Episode 6
Britney Haynes Big Brother 12 & Big Brother 14	36	Real estate agent	Tulsa, Oklahoma	Eliminated; Episode 5
Josh Martinez Big Brother 19	29	Content creator	Miami, Florida	Eliminated; Episode 4
Danielle Reyes Big Brother 3 & Big Brother 7: All-Stars	51	Real estate manager	San Francisco, California	Eliminated; Episode 3
Cody Calafiore Big Brother 16 & Big Brother 22: All-Stars	32	Software sales rep	Howell, New Jersey	Eliminated; Episode 2
Cameron Hardin Big Brother 25	34	Stay-at-home dad	Eastman, Georgia	Eliminated; Episode 1

=== Future appearances ===
In 2024, Josh Martinez competed on The Challenge 40: Battle of the Eras. Martinez competed on the second season of the Telemundo reality television series Los 50.

In 2025, Xavier Prather competed on season one of The Anonymous. Britney Haynes and Danielle Reyes competed on season three of The Traitors US. Martinez competed in season one of Destination X. Taylor Hale competed in The Amazing Race 38.

In 2026, Martinez competed on the sixth season of La casa de los famosos.

== Episodes ==
No.	Title	Original release date	U.S. viewers (millions)	Rating/share (18–49)
1	"Episode 1"	December 11, 2023	1.53	0.26/2
Nine All-Star HouseGuests entered the holiday-themed Big Brother house, which is referred to as Santa's Lodge.: Naughty and Nice Challenge: The HouseGuests must observe a series of clues that hint at the title of a famous Christmas song. The first person to name the song correctly in the Diary Room wins the Naughty and Nice power.; Britney was the first to guess the song correctly, "Up on the Housetop", to win the advantage. Britney would later learn that with the advantage comes a disadvantage, which she must grant to another contestant. After hearing the other HouseGuests, Britney decided to give Cody the Naughty stocking, as he is a threat in competitions.: Jingle Bell Brawl Challenge: The HouseGuests would walk across a balance beam, and when they reached the other side, they must put a letter in another HouseGuests' mailbox. The first person to deliver all their letters and re-deliver all the letters given to them wins the challenge. Britney started with an advantage of one fewer envelope in her mailbox, while Cody received an extra envelope. In the end, Frankie won the challenge.; Frankie had to decide which two HouseGuests would participate in the Santa's Showdown to determine who would be eliminated. He chose Cameron and Xavier.: Santa's Showdown: Both Cameron and Xavier had to complete a puzzle of an ugly Christmas sweater using a picture for reference. In the end, Xavier won the challenge and Cameron was eliminated. On his way out, Cameron received a gift for a one-year membership to the Jelly of the Month Club.
2	"Episode 2"	December 12, 2023	1.59	0.23/3
Naughty and Nice Challenge: There is a list of different Christmas songs and the carollers have torn their lyrics, notes etc. The houseguests must find which music is untorn. First houseguest to guess correctly gets a game changing advantage.; Cody correctly guess with the song "Deck the Halls" and gets to choose the teams for the next challenge and also gets to give disadvantage to one of the opposing team members. He chooses Frankie, Nicole and Xavier to be on his team and other four houseguests Danielle, Britney, Taylor and Josh forms the opposing team. Cody gives the disadvantage to Taylor.: Jingle Bell Brawl Challenge:Houseguests must balance different decorations on their tree one by one. First team whose all four houseguests had completed their trees wins immunity. Taylor must decorate a small tree before her team can start because of her disadvantage.; Nicole took a lot of time on her tree leading to Brothers Britney's team winning. Then the winning team have to choose to save someone from the losing team. They end up choosing Nicole because they wanted a big target to be eliminated.: Santa's Showdown:houseguests would read the demands of different children and then they would pack the toy fulfilling their demands in their respective gift boxes. Last house guest to complete will be eliminated.; Xavier completes first followed by Frankie. Cody Calafiore was eliminated.
3	"Episode 3"	December 14, 2023	2.04	0.30/3
Naughty and Nice Challenge: Jingle Bell Brawl Challenge: Santa's Showdown: Danielle Reyes was eliminated.
4	"Episode 4"	December 18, 2023	1.78	0.28/3
Naughty and Nice Challenge: Jingle Bell Brawl Challenge: Santa's Showdown: Josh Martinez was eliminated.
5	"Episode 5"	December 19, 2023	2.03	0.30/3
Naughty and Nice Challenge: Jingle Bell Brawl Challenge: Santa's Showdown: Britney Haynes was eliminated.
6	"Episode 6"	December 21, 2023	2.29	0.32/3
Naughty and Nice Challenge: Jingle Bell Brawl Challenge: Santa's Showdown:

== Competition history ==
The Houseguest won Big Brother: Reindeer Games and the $100,000 prize.
The Houseguest was the runner-up.
The Houseguest was eliminated in the finale.
The Houseguest won the Jingle Bell Brawl challenge, securing immunity and nomination power.
The Houseguest was nominated to compete in the Santa's Showdown challenge.
The Houseguest was eliminated from the Lodge after losing the Santa's Showdown challenge.

Progress of HouseGuests including competition and nomination history during each episode of the program.
HouseGuest	Episode 1	Episode 2	Episode 3	Episode 4	Episode 5	Episode 6
Naughty and Nice Challenge Winner	Britney	Cody	Taylor	Frankie	Nicole	Xavier
Naughty List Punishment Recipient(s)	Cody	Taylor	Josh	Nicole; Xavier	Xavier	Nicole
Jingle Bell Brawl Challenge Winner(s)	Frankie	Britney; Danielle; Josh; Taylor	Nicole (Note: For this episode's Santa Showdown, the Jingle Brawl Winner nominates one contestant into Santa's Showdown. If that contestant finishes the challenge in the allotted time, they then choose a contestant to go into Santa's Showdown. This contestant will have less time than the player who went before them. This process repeats until someone loses the challenge and is eliminated.)	Frankie; Taylor	Taylor; Frankie	(None)
Santa's Showdown Nominees	Cameron; Xavier	Cody; Frankie; Xavier	~~Frankie~~; ~~Xavier~~; ~~Britney~~; Danielle	Josh; Nicole	Britney; Xavier	(None)
Nicole	Safe	Safe	Brawl Winner	Showdown	Safe	Winner (Episode 6)
Taylor	Safe	Brawl Winner	Safe	Brawl Winner	Brawl Winner	Runner-up (Episode 6)
Frankie	Brawl Winner	Showdown	Showdown	Brawl Winner	Brawl Winner	Finalist (Episode 6)
Xavier	Showdown	Showdown	Showdown	Safe	Showdown	Finalist (Episode 6)
Britney	Safe	Brawl Winner	Showdown	Safe	Showdown	Eliminated (Episode 5)
Josh	Safe	Brawl Winner	Safe	Showdown	Eliminated (Episode 4)	
Danielle	Safe	Brawl Winner	Showdown	Eliminated (Episode 3)		
Cody	Safe	Showdown	Eliminated (Episode 2)			
Cameron	Showdown	Eliminated (Episode 1)				
Eliminated	Cameron; Lost Santa's; Showdown	Cody; Lost Santa's; Showdown	Danielle; Lost Santa's; Showdown	Josh; Lost Santa's; Showdown	Britney; Lost Santa's; Showdown	Xavier; Lost Semi-final Bracket
Eliminated	Cameron; Lost Santa's; Showdown	Cody; Lost Santa's; Showdown	Danielle; Lost Santa's; Showdown	Josh; Lost Santa's; Showdown	Britney; Lost Santa's; Showdown	Frankie; Lost Semi-final Bracket
Eliminated	Cameron; Lost Santa's; Showdown	Cody; Lost Santa's; Showdown	Danielle; Lost Santa's; Showdown	Josh; Lost Santa's; Showdown	Britney; Lost Santa's; Showdown	Taylor; Lost Final Bracket
Eliminated	Cameron; Lost Santa's; Showdown	Cody; Lost Santa's; Showdown	Danielle; Lost Santa's; Showdown	Josh; Lost Santa's; Showdown	Britney; Lost Santa's; Showdown	Nicole; Won Final Bracket

== Production ==
=== Development ===
In May 2023 Deadline Hollywood reported that CBS was considering an additional season of Big Brother in the 2023–24 television schedule, with "all-star contestants", to fill in gaps left by the 2023 Hollywood labor disputes. CBS had previously done the same with Big Brother 9 which aired in 2008, to combat the 2007–08 Writers Guild of America strike.

Prior to the Big Brother 25 finale in November 2023, host Julie Chen Moonves teased a "holiday surprise" from the "Big Brother universe". In an interview following the episode, Chen Moonves stated that a fourth season of Celebrity Big Brother was unlikely to happen, but noted the possibility of a shortened season with returning players. The Hollywood labor disputes ended with the 2023 Writers Guild of America strike ending in September, and the 2023 SAG-AFTRA strike ending two months after. With most scripted series set to begin filming shortened seasons in late-November and early-December, and most premiering in 2024, there were still empty slots in the schedule.

During the Big Brother 25 finale, it was announced that a new spin-off of Big Brother would air in December titled Big Brother: Reindeer Games. The series was produced by Fly on the Wall Entertainment and Banijay Americas (originally Endemol Shine North America) with Allison Grodner, Rich Meehan, and Chris Roach serving as executive producers, all returning from Big Brother.

In November 2024, it was announced that the series would not air a second season in December, with producers citing that they could not find airtime availability on CBS. Although they remained hopeful that it could return in the future.

=== Casting ===
The series did not feature Chen Moonves and was instead hosted by former Big Brother HouseGuests Derek Xiao, Tiffany Mitchell, and Jordan Lloyd, who were known as "Santa's Elf Ambassadors"; Xiao and Mitchell competed on Big Brother 23, while Lloyd was on both Big Brother 11 and Big Brother 13. Additionally, nine other former contestants, including one from Big Brother 25, would return to compete.

== Marketing and release ==
The series premiered on December 11, 2023, and was filmed in its entirety prior to its release. It did not feature any live feeds. Big Brother: Reindeer Games aired three episodes a week on Monday, Tuesday, and Thursday, over two weeks, totaling six episodes before its finale on December 21. A teaser trailer was aired during the Big Brother 25 finale featuring former competitors Frankie Grande, Britney Haynes, and Danielle Reyes, and was based off a similar teaser that aired to promote the twenty-fifth season. Episodes from the series also streamed on Paramount+.

== See also ==
- Big Brother UK Panto – A Christmas-themed spin-off of Big Brother UK in which former contestants reunited to produce the pantomime play.
