= Josh Martinez (television personality) =

American television personality

- Born: Joshua Martinez; January 4, 1994 (age 32); Miami, Florida
- Education: Everglades High School
- Alma mater: St. Thomas University
- Occupation: Television personality
- Years active: 2017–present
- Television: Big Brother 19 (winner); The Challenge: War of the Worlds; The Challenge: War of the Worlds 2; The Challenge: Total Madness; The Challenge: Double Agents; The Challenge: Spies, Lies & Allies; The Challenge: USA 2; Big Brother Reindeer Games; Los 50; The Challenge 40: Battle of the Eras; Destination X; La casa de los famosos 6
- Relatives: Maytee Martinez (sister)

Joshua "Josh" Martinez (born January 4, 1994) is an American television personality who has competed on season 19 of Big Brother and season 6 of the American-Spanish language Celebrity Big Brother version, La casa de los famosos, as well as multiple seasons of The Challenge: War of the Worlds (2019), War of the Worlds 2 (2019), Total Madness (2020), Double Agents (2020–2021), Spies, Lies & Allies (2021), USA (season 2, 2023), and The Challenge 40: Battle of the Eras (2024) as well as other reality TV shows.

== Early life and education ==
Martinez' parents came from Cuba to America and shortly after gave birth to him and his siblings. Martinez was born in Miami, Florida. Nine year before competing on Big Brother, he moved to Homestead, Florida. He attended Everglades High School and graduated from St. Thomas University.

== Career ==
Martinez has been cast on multiple television series, including Big Brother 19, Big Brother Reindeer Games and La casa de los famosos, the Spanish celebrity version of Big Brother. He also participated in multiple iterations of The Challenge as well as Los 50 and Destination X.

=== Big Brother ===
In Big Brother 19, Martinez was known for his close friendship with Christmas Abbott and returning player Paul Abrahamian, banging pots and pans while singing circus music, calling people "meatballs", and delivering loud Diary Room confessionals. Martinez would go on the make it to the final 2 and win the final Head of Household competition where he took Abrahamian to the end and narrowly won the season in a 5–4 jury vote.

In 2023, Martinez returned for his second appearance on special holiday theme game on Big Brother Reindeer Games. He built much smoother relationships with the rest of the cast this time around. He was not targeted until episode 4 when one of the Jingle Bell Brawl winners, Frankie Grande, chose him as his target for Santa's Showdown where he would eventually lose to the eventual winner, Nicole Franzel.

In 2026, Martinez returned to Big Brother when he was cast for the sixth season of the American Spanish-language version of Celebrity Big Brother, La casa de los famosos. He finished in 4th place.

=== The Challenge ===
Martinez has competed on seven seasons of The Challenge. He has never placed higher than fifth place, being just shy of making it to a final. He currently holds an elimination record of one win and seven eliminations.

=== Other television appearances ===
Following his Big Brother win, Martinez was cast to make a guest appearance on an episode of The Bold and the Beautiful where he played the role of Chef Josh. In 2024, he competed on the second season of Los 50 where he placed 34th. Later the following year, he appeared on the first season of Destination X where he was the first player eliminated.

== Personal life ==
Martinez is the brother of the Cuban American model Maytee Martinez. In an interview, Martinez said "I've never really felt the need to label myself or to say I'm this or I'm that. I'm just Josh" when discussing his sexuality.

== Filmography ==
=== Television ===
Year	Title	Role	Notes
2017	Big Brother	Contestant	Winner; season 19
2017	The Bold and the Beautiful	Chef Josh	
2018	Celebrity Big Brother	Guest	Season 1
2018	Big Brother	Guest	Season 20
2019	The Challenge: War of the Worlds	Contestant	20th place
2019	The Challenge: War of the Worlds 2	Contestant	14th place
2020	The Challenge: Total Madness	Contestant	12th place
2020–2021	The Challenge: Double Agents	Contestant	15th place
2021	The Challenge: Spies, Lies & Allies	Contestant	9th place
2023	The Challenge: USA 2	Contestant	5th place
2023	Big Brother Reindeer Games	Contestant	6th place
2024	Los 50	Contestant	34th place; season 2
2024–2025	The Challenge 40: Battle of the Eras	Contestant	6th place
2025	Destination X	Contestant	12th place; season 1
2026	La casa de los famosos	Contestant	4th place; season 6
2026	House of Villains	Guest	Season 3
2026	Big Brother	Guest	Season 28
2026	Big Brother: Unlocked	Guest	Season 2

== See also ==
- List of Big Brother (American TV series) houseguests
- List of The Challenge (TV series) contestants

Preceded by Nicole Franzel (18); Morgan Willett (BBOTT)	Winner of Big Brother; Season 19	Succeeded by Kaycee Clark
