= Los 50 season 1 =

Los 50
- Season 1
- No. of contestants: 50
- Winner: Ana Parra
- Runner-up: Fernando Lozada
- No. of episodes: 50

Release
- Original network: Telemundo
- Original release: July 18 – September 25, 2023

Season chronology
- Next → Season 2

The first season of the American reality competition television series Los 50 premiered on Telemundo on July 18, 2023. The season was announced on May 11, 2023, and follows fifty celebrities competing in a series of challenges to win up to $350,000 while isolated from the outside world.

The season concluded on September 25, 2023, with Ana Parra being crowned the winner of $347,560. Telemundo renewed the series for a second season.

== Contestants ==
Fifty celebrities were selected to compete in Los 50. The first group of celebrities was announced on June 21, 2023.

Name	Age	Hometown	Notability	Status	Ref
Ana Parra	28	Valle del Cauca, Colombia	Athlete / model	Winner on September 25, 2023	
Fernando Lozada	33	Colombia	Reality television star	Runner-up on September 25, 2023	
Lorenzo Méndez	36	Pittsburg, California	Musician	3rd place on September 25, 2023	
Douglas Castillo	29	Santa Ana, Costa Rica	Athlete / reality television star	4th place on September 25, 2023	
Brandon Castañeda	23	Guadalajara, Mexico	Influencer	5th place on September 25, 2023	
Luis "Potro" Caballero	30	Mexico City, Mexico	Singer / Reality television star	6th place on September 25, 2023	
Julia Gama	30	Porto Alegre, Brazil	Miss Brazil 2020 / first runner-up in Miss Universe 2020	Eliminated on September 22, 2023	
Macky González	34	Puebla, Mexico	Athlete	Eliminated on September 22, 2023	
Rafael Nieves	34	Hermosillo, Mexico	Actor	Eliminated on September 21, 2023	
Daniela "Bebeshita" Alexis	32	Mexico City, Mexico	Influencer / reality television star	Eliminated on September 20, 2023	
Manelyk González	34	Mexico City, Mexico	Reality television star	Eliminated on September 19, 2023	
Glenda Chapa	27	Mexico	Reality television star	Eliminated on September 18, 2023	
Lambda García	36	Mexico City, Mexico	Actor	Eliminated on September 14, 2023	
Kim Shantal	29	Tijuana, Mexico	YouTuber	Eliminated on September 11, 2023	
Polo Monárrez	44	Chihuahua, Mexico	Actor	Eliminated on September 11, 2023	
Rey Grupero	36	Mexico City, Mexico	Influencer	Eliminated on September 7, 2023	
Michelle Lando	23	Paraguay	Influencer	Eliminated on September 4, 2023	
Esteban Castillo	29	Santa Ana, Costa Rica	Athlete / reality television star	Eliminated on August 31, 2023	
Isa Castro	27	Mexico City, Mexico	Internet personality	Eliminated on August 31, 2023	
Suavecito	29	Mexico	Internet personality	Eliminated on August 29, 2023	
Julio Ron	37	Guadalajara, Mexico	Sportsman	Eliminated on August 29, 2023	
José Ramos	35	Dominican Republic	Flight attendant / dancer	Eliminated on August 29, 2023	
Karely López	33	Culiacán, Mexico	Boxer	Eliminated on August 24, 2023	
Dania Méndez	31	Ciudad Guzmán, Mexico	Influencer / reality television star	Eliminated on August 21, 2023	
Fernanda de la Mora	28	Mexico City, Mexico	Athlete	Eliminated on August 17, 2023	
Juan Pablo Llano	45	Medellín, Colombia	Actor	Eliminated on August 14, 2023	
Sebastián Caicedo	42	Cali, Colombia	Actor	Eliminated on August 14, 2023	
Beta Mejía	28	Medellín, Colombia	Athlete / Internet personality	Eliminated on August 10, 2023	
Daniela Tapia	36	Havana, Cuba	Actress	Eliminated on August 7, 2023	
Luisa Fernanda Cataño	30	Medellín, Colombia	YouTuber	Eliminated on August 7, 2023	
Salvador Zerboni	44	Mexico City, Mexico	Actor	Eliminated on August 3, 2023	
Jessica Coch	43	Puebla, Mexico	Actress	Eliminated on August 3, 2023	
Adriano Zendejas	27	Mexico City, Mexico	Actor	Eliminated on August 3, 2023	
Anahí Izali	32	Mexico	Reality television star	Eliminated on July 31, 2023	
Ojani Noa	49	Cuba	Actor	Eliminated on July 31, 2023	
Isabella Sierra	18	Neiva, Colombia	Actress	Eliminated on July 31, 2023	
Gianmarco Onestini	26	Castel San Pietro Terme, Italy	Reality television star	Eliminated on July 31, 2023	
Nicole Chávez	24	Mexico City, Mexico	Reality television star	Eliminated on July 27, 2023	
Thali García	33	Hermosillo, Mexico	Actress	Eliminated on July 27, 2023	
Asaf Torres	25	Vega Baja, Puerto Rico	TV personality	Eliminated on July 24, 2023	
Alan Slim	39	Mexicali, Mexico	Actor	Eliminated on July 24, 2023	
Aneudy Lara	N/A	Baní, Dominican Republic	Actor	Eliminated on July 24, 2023	
Fernando Noriega	44	León, Mexico	Actor	Eliminated on July 20, 2023	
Cecilia Ponce	41	Buenos Aires, Argentina	Actress	Eliminated on July 20, 2023	
Jessica Stonem	36	Mexico City, Mexico	Influencer / Reality television star	Eliminated on July 20, 2023	
Yuliana Peniche	41	Mexico City, Mexico	Actress	Eliminated on July 20, 2023	
Shirley Arica Valle	34	Lima, Peru	Influencer	Expelled on July 19, 2023	
Julieta Grajales	37	Tuxtla Gutiérrez, Mexico	Actress	Eliminated on July 18, 2023	
Samira Jalil	32	Argentina	Reality television star	Eliminated on July 18, 2023	
Juan Vidal	46	Santo Domingo, Dominican Republic	Actor	Eliminated on July 18, 2023	

== Elimination table ==
Place	Contestant	Elimination ceremonies																			Elimination challenges (Note: From the twentieth round onwards, whoever loses the Arena challenge will be automatically eliminated without a voting ceremony.)					Finale
Place	Contestant	1	2	3	4	5	6	7	8	9	10	11	12	13	14	15	16	17	18	19	20	21	22	23	24	Finale
1	Ana	Safe	Safe	Safe	Safe	Safe	Safe	Safe	Safe	Safe	Safe	Safe	Safe	Safe	Safe	Safe	Safe	Safe	Safe	Nominated	Safe	Safe	Safe	Safe	Safe	Winner
2	Fernando L.	Safe	Safe	Safe	Safe	Safe	Safe	Safe	Safe	Safe	Safe	Safe	Safe	Safe	Safe	Safe	Safe	Safe	Safe	Nominated	Safe	Safe	Safe	Safe	Safe	Runner-up
3	Lorenzo	Safe	Safe	Safe	Safe	Safe	Safe	Safe	Safe	Safe	Nominated	Nominated	Safe	Nominated	Nominated	Safe	Nominated	Safe	Safe	Safe	Safe	Safe	Safe	Safe	Safe	3rd place
4	Douglas	Safe	Safe	Safe	Safe	Safe	Safe	Safe	Nominated	Nominated	Safe	Safe	Safe	Safe	Safe	Safe	Safe	Safe	Safe	Safe	Safe	Safe	Safe	Safe	Safe	4th place
5	Brandon	Safe	Safe	Nominated	Safe	Safe	Safe	Safe	Safe	Safe	Safe	Safe	Safe	Safe	Safe	Safe	Safe	Safe	Safe	Nominated	Safe	Safe	Safe	Safe	Safe	5th place
6	Potro	Safe	Safe	Safe	Safe	Safe	Safe	Safe	Safe	Nominated	Safe	Safe	Nominated	Safe	Nominated	Nominated	Safe	Nominated	Nominated	Nominated	Safe	Safe	Safe	Safe	Safe	6th place
7	Julia	Safe	Safe	Safe	Safe	Safe	Nominated	Safe	Safe	Safe	Safe	Safe	Safe	Safe	Safe	Safe	Safe	Safe	Nominated	Safe	Safe	Safe	Safe	Safe	Eliminated	
8	Macky	Safe	Safe	Safe	Safe	Safe	Nominated	Safe	Safe	Nominated	Safe	Nominated	Safe	Nominated	Safe	Safe	Nominated	Safe	Safe	Safe	Safe	Safe	Safe	Eliminated		
9	Rafael	Safe	Safe	Safe	Safe	Safe	Safe	Nominated	Safe	Safe	Safe	Nominated	Safe	Safe	Nominated	Safe	Nominated	Safe	Nominated	Safe	Safe	Safe	Eliminated			
10	Bebeshita	Nominated	Safe	Safe	Safe	Safe	Safe	Nominated	Safe	Safe	Safe	Nominated	Nominated	Safe	Safe	Nominated	Safe	Nominated	Nominated	Safe	Safe	Eliminated				
11	Manelyk	Safe	Safe	Safe	Safe	Safe	Nominated	Safe	Safe	Safe	Nominated	Eliminated	Immune (Note: Manelyk was voted by Esteban, Isa and Rafael to re-enter the competition and received immunity in this round.)	Safe	Safe	Safe	Nominated	Safe (Note: Ana used her blue Joker to save Manelyk from elimination.)	Safe (Note: Manelyk lost the Arena challenge and was nominated for elimination, however Douglas used his green Joker to save her and named Lambda as the replacement nominee.)	Safe	Eliminated					
12	Glenda	Nominated	Safe	Safe	Safe	Safe	Safe	Nominated	Nominated	Safe	Safe	Safe	Safe	Safe	Safe	Nominated	Safe	Safe	Safe	Eliminated						
13	Lambda	Safe	Safe	Safe	Nominated	Safe	Safe	Safe	Safe	Safe	Safe	Safe	Safe	Safe	Safe	Safe	Safe	Safe	Eliminated							
14	Kim	Safe	Safe	Safe	Safe	Nominated	Safe	Safe	Safe	Nominated	Safe	Safe	Nominated	Safe	Safe	Safe	Safe	Eliminated								
15	Polo	Safe	Safe	Nominated	Safe	Safe	Safe	Safe	Safe	Safe	Safe	Safe	Safe	Safe (Note: Polo lost the Arena challenge and was nominated for elimination, however he used his green Joker to save himself and named Julio as the replacement nominee.)	Safe	Nominated	Safe	Eliminated								
16	Rey	Nominated	Safe	Nominated	Nominated	Safe	Safe	Safe	Safe	Safe	Nominated	Safe	Nominated	Safe	Safe	Nominated	Eliminated									
17	Michelle	Safe	Safe	Safe	Nominated	Safe	Safe	Safe	Safe	Safe	Safe	Safe	Safe	Safe	Safe	Eliminated										
18	Esteban	Safe	Safe	Safe	Safe	Safe	Safe	Safe	Safe	Safe	Safe	Safe	Safe	Safe	Eliminated											
19	Isa	Safe	Nominated	Safe	Safe	Safe	Safe	Nominated	Safe	Nominated	Nominated	Safe	Safe	Safe (Note: Fernando Lozada used his gold Joker to save Isa from elimination.)	Eliminated											
20	Suavecito	Safe	Safe	Safe	Nominated	Nominated	Nominated	Safe	Safe	Safe	Safe	Nominated	Nominated	Eliminated												
21	Julio	Safe	Safe	Safe	Safe	Safe	Safe	Safe	Safe	Safe	Safe	Safe	Safe	Eliminated												
22	José	Nominated	Nominated	Safe	Safe	Nominated	Safe	Safe	Nominated	Safe	Safe	Nominated	Safe	Eliminated												
23	Karely	Safe	Safe	Safe	Safe	Safe	Safe	Nominated	Safe	Safe	Safe	Safe	Eliminated													
24	Dania	Nominated	Safe	Safe	Safe	Nominated	Safe	Safe	Nominated	Safe	Safe	Eliminated														
25	Fernanda	Safe	Safe	Safe	Safe	Safe	Safe	Nominated	Safe	Safe	Eliminated															
26	Juan Pablo	Nominated	Safe	Safe	Safe	Safe	Nominated	Safe	Nominated	Eliminated																
27	Sebastián	Safe	Nominated	Safe	Safe	Safe	Safe	Nominated	Nominated	Eliminated																
28	Beta	Safe	Safe	Safe	Safe	Safe	Safe	Safe	Eliminated																	
29	Daniela	Safe	Safe	Nominated	Safe	Safe	Safe	Eliminated																		
30	Luisa	Safe	Nominated	Safe	Nominated	Safe	Safe	Eliminated																		
31	Salvador	Safe	Safe	Safe	Safe	Safe	Eliminated																			
32	Jessica C.	Safe	Safe	Safe	Safe	Safe	Eliminated																			
33	Adriano	Safe	Safe	Safe	Safe	Safe	Eliminated																			
34	Anahí	Safe	Safe	Safe	Nominated	Eliminated																				
35	Ojani	Safe	Safe	Safe	Safe	Eliminated																				
36	Isabella	Safe	Safe	Nominated	Nominated	Eliminated																				
37	Gianmarco	Nominated	Safe	Safe	Safe	Eliminated																				
38	Nicole	Safe	Safe	Safe	Eliminated																					
39	Thali	Safe	Safe	Safe	Eliminated																					
40	Asaf	Safe	Safe	Eliminated																						
41	Alan	Safe	Safe	Eliminated																						
42	Aneudy	Safe	Safe	Eliminated																						
43	Fernando N.	Nominated	Eliminated																							
44	Cecilia	Safe	Eliminated																							
45	Jessica S.	Safe	Eliminated																							
46	Yuliana	Safe	Eliminated																							
47	Shirley	Safe	Expelled																							
48	Julieta	Eliminated																								
49	Samira	Eliminated																								
50	Juan	Eliminated																								

Notes

The celebrity was nominated for elimination.
The celebrity was nominated, however, won the safety competition and was safe from elimination.
The celebrity was nominated for elimination, however, was saved by the green Joker.
The celebrity was eliminated from the competition.
The celebrity was expelled from the competition.

== Episodes ==
No. overall	No. in season	Title	Original release date	U.S. viewers (millions)
1	1	"Adrenalina pura"	July 18, 2023	0.96
The Lion welcomes the fifty celebrities to his estate and informs them that they must earn the grand prize of US$350,000 by winning a series of challenges. He gives them a starting amount of $20,000 and an opportunity to win $5,000. The celebrities are separated into two teams and each is given a challenge. The red team is given the task of lining up their members alphabetically but failed and lost $5,000. The blue team is challenged with finding ten coins hidden in chests inside a pool, they win the challenge and earn back the $5,000 lost by the red team, keeping the jackpot at $20,000.: The Arena: The celebrities are thrown paintballs by the Lion's assistants. The first twelve celebrities hit by a ball or that step off the game area are nominated for elimination.; Safety Competition: The nominated celebrities have to hang onto poles suspended over water and hold on as long as possible. Macky won the challenge and was safe from elimination.; Elimination: The celebrities voted on who they wanted to save from elimination, with each being allowed to vote for eight nominees. Dania received the most votes of the night. Juan Vidal received the fewest votes and is the first to be eliminated, with Samira being the second. A tie breaking vote is held between Gianmarco and Julieta, with the latter being the third eliminated celebrity.
2	2	"Estalla el drama"	July 19, 2023	0.85
¿Vas o no vas?: In the first stage, Fernando Lozada must hold up weight bars for 10 minutes without dropping them to earn $2,000. With one minute left, Fernando drops the bars and fails the challenge. In the second stage, Potro competed against The Fox to see who can build an arc the fastest using wooden blocks, Potro wins the challenge and earns $1,000. In the third stage, Fernanda competed against The Fox to fill a frame with different shaped pieces and none of the pieces being allowed stick out of the frame, she fails the challenge and lost $2,000. The game ends with the jackpot down to $17,000.; Locura del León: The celebrities are given 5 minutes to stuff one car with luggage and fit themselves inside four other cars. They passed the challenge and won $4,000, raising the jackpot to $21,000.; After a physical altercation with Thali in the bathroom, Shirley is expelled from the competition.: The Arena: The celebrities are asked to pair up and pick a platform with the same number on opposite sides. Afterwards, they competed against each other to retrieve a totem from a mud pool. Once a celebrity retrieves the totem they are safe from elimination. The final six celebrities left in the game are nominated for elimination.
3	3	"El poder de las alianzas"	July 20, 2023	0.75
¿Vas o no vas?: In the first stage, Lambda competed against The Fox to see who could solve a sliding puzzle the fastest, he beats The Fox and wins $2,000. In the second stage, Beta has 10 minutes to release a chain using different keys to unscrew the nuts holding the chain, he wins the challenge and earns an additional $2,000. In the final stage, Juan Pablo is given 5 minutes to duplicate three drawings without crossing lines or taking his marker off the paper, he fails the challenge and loses $2,000. The game ends with the jackpot at $23,000.; The Arena: The celebrities are shown colors on screens and must stand on the corresponding squares to stay safe. The final three players are nominated for elimination.; Safety Competition: The celebrities must change a rope from one reel to another without using their hands and then retrieve the coin located in front of their second reel. Bebeshita won the challenge and was safe from elimination.; Elimination: The celebrities are able to vote for four nominees they want to save and the four with the fewest votes are eliminated. José had the most votes and is safe, while Yuliana had the fewest and was the first to be eliminated. Jessica Stonem and Cecilia are also eliminated due to insufficient votes. Fernando Noriega is the fourth celebrity eliminated.
4	4	"La primera en negarse"	July 21, 2023	0.87
¿Vas o no vas?: In the first stage, Jessica Coch is given 7 minutes hang seven nails on a steel cable using only one hand, she fails the challenge and loses $3,000. Jessica picked Nicole to play the second stage, however, Nicole decided to pass on the challenge and lost $1,500 from the jackpot; she picked Macky as her replacement. Macky successfully completed a Tower of Hanoi puzzle and won $3,000. In the third stage, Asaf had to climb a rope and hold on for 90 seconds but could not use his feet to hold himself up, he failed the challenge and lost $4,000. The game ends with the jackpot down to $17,500.; Locura del León: The celebrities are seated in two rows and are given 15 minutes to transport buckets of water from the start tub to three end containers. The water can only be transported over their heads and they had to be blindfolded. They passed the challenge and won $8,000, raising the jackpot to $25,500.; The Arena: The celebrities are divided into two teams and must place three balls in their basket, passing the ball from one side of a wall to the other. If a person hits the ball twice or it falls on the ground, they will have to start over. The game starts with two teams of 21 players and continues until two teams of 6 compete against each other in the final round, where the losing team is nominated for elimination.
5	5	"Equilibrio por la permanencia"	July 24, 2023	0.86
Locura del León: The celebrities are divided into teams of five and must wear skies to collect fruits from the end bins and bring them back to the starting point. They win the challenge and earn $4,500, raising the jackpot $30,000.; The Arena: The Arena is filled with various objects of different colors, including pyramids, exercise bicycles, and ramps. The Lion calls out the name and color of an object and the celebrities must get on top of the object and hold on for ten seconds. The celebrities who are able to hold on are safe from elimination. The three celebrities who fail the challenge are nominated for elimination.; Safety Competition: The nominated celebrities use two ropes to propel a bar up a board to place a billiard ball in the hole. Lorenzo is the first to complete the challenge and is safe from elimination.; Elimination: The celebrities are able to vote for five nominees they want to save and the three with the fewest votes will be eliminated. Rey Grupero and Daniela received the most votes, each receiving 31 votes. Aneudy received the fewest votes and is the first elimination of the night. Alan is the second to be eliminated, with Asaf being the third eliminated celebrity.
6	6	"Es hora de amasar fortuna"	July 25, 2023	0.93
Fortuna: In the first challenge, one celebrity drags a cart to transport as many players as possible from the inner court to the finish line so that each player can take a pennant that is worth $1,000. After six minutes, they earned $18,000. In the second challenge, the celebrities have ten minutes to transfer fifteen balls across a board with holes and into the basket, they win the challenge and earn $9,000. In the third challenge, Glenda, Suavecito and Bebeshita are randomly picked to climb on to a raised platform and retrieve three batons. Glenda failed and lost $3,000, Suavecito retrieved his baton and earned $4,000, Bebeshita failed to retrieve the third baton and lost $6,000. The game ends with the jackpot at $52,000.
7	7	"El Joker"	July 26, 2023	0.91
Joker: In the first round, the celebrities are divided into three groups and each had to move a ball across their station to the finish line. The winning group played against each other in the final round. Fernando Lozada won the Gold Joker medal which can save him or another celebrity from elimination.; ¿Vas o no vas?: In the first stage, Manelyk and Thali play as a duo, where they have five minutes to assemble a chair, with Thali building and Manelyk reading the instructions. They win the challenge and earn $3,000. In the second stage, Adriano has one minute to move a crank handle using one hand and remove the flag from the reel, he fails and loses $2,000. In the third stage, Luisa Fernanda has five minutes to complete a circuit maze, she fails and loses $2,000. The game ends with the jackpot down to $51,000.; The Arena: The celebrities played a game of dodgeball. They must avoid getting hit or stepping out of the playing area, while randomly chosen ball throwers must hit someone in order to be safe from elimination. After three rounds, the bottom five celebrities are nominated for elimination.
8	8	"En pie de guerra"	July 27, 2023	0.85
Locura del León: Kim, Glenda and Juan Pablo are randomly chosen to throw hula hoops from an elevated platform to the other celebrities, who must catch four hoops without using their hands. They win the challenge and earn $4,000, raising the jackpot to $55,000.; The Arena: Five celebrities are chosen to become a blindfolded predator, while the rest of the group becomes the prey. The predator chooses a celebrity to identify and if they guess correctly, they are safe from elimination, but if they fail they are nominated. The five predators fail to identify any of the celebrities and are nominated for elimination.; Safety Competition: The nominees must slide a billiard ball down a course to get it to the end basket. They must build a path on the course rails and be the first to get two balls into their basket. Sebastián won the final round and safety.; Elimination: The celebrities vote for seven nominees they want to save and the two with the fewest votes will be eliminated. Isabella received the most votes and is safe. Thali received the fewest votes and is the first to be eliminated, with Nicole being the second elimination of the night.
9	9	"Sabotaje y tropiezos"	July 28, 2023	0.89
¿Vas o no vas?: In the first stage, Bebeshita had to touch and identify at least three items from five mystery boxes, she passed and won $2,000. In the second stage, Ana has two minutes to take out the key inside a block of ice and use it to free herself from the shackle, she passed and won $2,000. In the third stage, Douglas competed against The Fox to see who can untie ropes the fastest, he won and earned $2,000. The games ends with the jackpot up to $61,000.; Locura del León: The celebrities are tied together in groups by their shoelaces and have twenty minutes to collect all the balls in the yard. They passed the challenge and won $4,000, raising the jackpot to $65,000.; The Arena: In this challenge, teams have to cross the arena from one side to the other using one board as a bridge to move from block to block. They must hang on to a rope to reach the finish line without touching the ground. The game continues until four celebrities are nominated for elimination.
10	10	"El mal querido"	July 31, 2023	0.89
Locura del León: The celebrities, playing in pairs, have a broom that they must leave standing in its place and be fast enough to change places before it falls. They fail the challenge and lose $4,000, bringing down the jackpot to $61,000.; The Arena: In the first round, three teams have to crawl one by one through a maze to find the eleven medallions hidden in the sand. In the second round, the losing team compete against each other to find five balls of their assigned color. The first six celebrities to find their balls are safe from elimination, while the rest are nominated.; Safety Competition: The nominees must position eight coins in their slot without dropping them. To keep the balance of the bar of their station they have to put a foot on the footboard. Salvador won the competition.; Elimination: The celebrities vote for four nominees they want to save and the four with the fewest votes will be eliminated. Suavecito had the most votes and is safe, while Gianmarco had the fewest and is the first to be eliminated. Isabella and Ojani are also eliminated due to insufficient votes. Anahí is the fourth celebrity eliminated.
11	11	"Un esfuerzo conjunto"	August 1, 2023	0.80
Locura del León: The celebrities have 15 minutes to fill two containers with water until they overflow. They must enter the pool to carry water with their bodies and squeeze it onto the platform that drains into the container. They pass the challenge and won $3,000, raising the jackpot to $64,000.; Fortuna: In the first challenge, the celebrities are divided into groups of four and have one minute to collect as many $20 bills as possible before they fall on the floor. They manage to collect $8,660. In the second challenge, the celebrities are blindfolded and have 20 minutes to collect all the coins that are on the ground and carry them to the box, while being guided by two other celebrities. They fail the challenge and lose $5,000. In the third challenge, the celebrities have 8 minutes to retrieve The Lion's statue from a container. Douglas is chosen break the pieces of wood, while Macky removes the chains, and Rafael breaks the container to open the safe and retrieve the statue. They win the challenge and earn $20,000. The game ends with the jackpot at $87,660.
12	12	"Declaración de Amor"	August 2, 2023	0.83
¿Vas o no vas?: In the first stage, Lorenzo is given four sheets of paper of different sizes to make balls using only one hand, and fit them into containers without sticking out. He could not use his body or surface as a support, he fails and loses $2,000. In the second stage, Brandon has 2.5 minutes to fill a container with beads until the bead weight is 3,550 grams, he wins and earns $2,000. In the third stage, Karely has 3 minutes to blow three spinning tops from the starting line to their respective colored slot, she fails and loses $2,000. The game ends with the jackpot down to $85,660.; The Arena: The celebrities are divided into teams and must cross all their members from one side of the arena to the other by holding on to vines. The game continues until four celebrities are nominated for elimination.
13	13	"Jaque mate"	August 3, 2023	0.93
¿Vas o no vas?: In the first stage, Salvador has 2.5 minutes to fill one side of a seesaw with sand in order to balance The Fox who is sitting on the other side, he fails and loses $2,000. In the second stage, Rafael has 8 minutes to recreate three figures using geometric pieces, he fails and loses $2,000. In the third stage, Julia is blindfolded and has eight tries to step over three squares that are painted on a carpet, she wins and earns $2,000. The game ends with the jackpot down to $83,660.; The Arena: The celebrities, playing in teams, must find the correct path to reach the other side of the arena. The game continues until a team of five is nominated for elimination.; Safety Competition: The nominees must retrieve rocks from the pool and build a tower that reaches the mark. José wins the final round and is safe from elimination.; Elimination: The celebrities vote for five nominees they want to save and the three with the fewest votes will be eliminated. Julia received the most votes and is safe. Adriano received the fewest votes and is the first elimination of the night. Jessica Coch is the second to be eliminated, with Salvador being eliminated third.
14	14	"Bandos fracturados"	August 4, 2023	0.76
Locura del León: The celebrities, working in groups, must get inside a fabric and go around the Lion's estate to collect 25 coins. The last team must cross the finish line within 12 minutes. They fail the challenge and lose $4,000, bringing the jackpot down to $79,660.; ¿Vas o no vas?: In the first stage, Rey must wear a helmet that has eight pretzels hanging from it. He has 3 minutes to eat the pretzels without using his hands, he wins and earns $2,000. In the second stage, Julio has 2.5 minutes to free five chains by opening their respective locks, he fails and loses $2,000. In the final stage, Polo played a matching game against the Fox, he failed to beat the Fox and lost $2,000. The game ends with the jackpot down to $77,660.; The Arena: The celebrities, competing in teams, must move their ball from one side of the arena to the other by throwing smaller balls at it. The game continues until four celebrities are nominated.
15	15	"Todos contra todos"	August 7, 2023	0.90
Locura del León: The celebrities must lie on the knee of the person behind them and keep their balance while passing three balls to each other. They win the challenge and earn $5,000, raising the jackpot to 82,660.; The Arena: The celebrities must climb slippery stairs and ring the bell at the top of the pyramid. The game continues until six celebrities are nominated for elimination.; Safety Competition: The nominees must retrieve three apples from a tree and transport them to their basket using the hook on their helmet. Suavecito wins the final round and is safe from elimination.; Elimination: The celebrities vote for seven nominees they want to save and the two with the fewest votes will be eliminated. Karely received the most votes and is safe. Luisa Fernanda received the fewest votes and is the first to be eliminated, with Daniela being the second elimination of the night.
16	16	"Alegría fugaz"	August 8, 2023	0.91
Beta, Julia and Rafael are randomly chosen to play the third challenge of Fortuna, and are informed that they must nominate a celebrity for elimination.: Fortuna: In the first challenge, the celebrities have 6 minutes to pop balloons with a pick around their waists and collect the golden balls found inside the balloons, each worth $500. They manage to collect $7,000. In the second challenge, the celebrities have 4 minutes to climb to the top of the volcano and raise the flag, they win the challenge and earn $5,000. In the third stage, Beta, Julia and Rafael each have 2 minutes to cross two balls through a rope structure without touching the ground. They collect all six balls and win $9,000. The game ends with the jackpot up to $103,660.; Beta, Julia and Rafael nominate Fernando Lozada for elimination.
17	17	"Galán en fuga"	August 9, 2023	0.87
¿Vas o no vas?: In the first stage, José must hold a bar with his hands and every 30 seconds the Fox will add a five pound bag to the bar until he completes five bags. He is able to hold up the bar for 3 minutes and wins $2,000. In the second stage, Sebastián and the Fox must each roll a die that indicates the colored column they have to remove from the tower. The player that knocks down the tower is the loser. Sebastián wins and earns $2,000. In the third stage, Dania must put a coin in each of the four cups inside the fishbowls, she wins and earns $2,000. The game ends with the jackpot at $109,660.; Locura del León: The celebrities, playing in pairs, have 15 minutes to pass under the four rails along the path. They fail the challenge and lose $4,000, bringing down the jackpot to $105,660.; The Arena: The celebrities, playing in teams, must each shoot their ball into the basket. Their shot cannot be direct and must bounce their ball on a platform. The game continues until four celebrities are nominated for elimination.
18	18	"Contrapeso"	August 10, 2023	0.80
¿Vas o no vas?: In the first stage, Suavecito plays against the fox and has 3 minutes to turn over as many game pieces as possible with the white color facing up. Suavecito wins and earns $2,000. In the second stage, Kim has 3 minutes to make three baskets, using her head to carry balls from one backboard to the other. Kim fails and loses $2,000. In the third stage, Glenda plays against the Fox to see who can put all their magnets on the board, she wins and earns $2,000. The game ends with the jackpot at $107,660.; The Arena: The celebrities, playing in teams, must free puzzle pieces found in cages in order to complete their puzzle. Before starting, they have 2 minutes to place as many objects on their opponents' cages to make them difficult to open. The game continues until three celebrities are nominated for elimination.; Safety Competition: The nominees must keep their surface in balance while building a five-story tower. Fernando Lozada wins the final round and is safe from elimination.; Elimination: The celebrities vote for six nominees they want to save, the one with the fewest votes will be eliminated. Dania received the most votes and is safe, while Beta received the fewest votes and is eliminated.
19	19	"Una jugada muy sucia"	August 11, 2023	0.91
¿Vas o no vas?: In the first stage, Esteban played against the Fox to see who could pop their opponents ballon first by pumping them with a pedal, while also balancing a ball on a platform. Esteban wins and earns $3,000. In the second stage, Michelle is blindfolded and has 3 minutes to fill container with 40 grams of cotton balls, she fails and loses $2,000. In the third stage, Isa has 4 minutes to reassemble a puzzle by including an extra piece that was initially left out, she fails and loses $2,000. The game ends with the jackpot down to $106,660.; Locura del León: The celebrities are divided into three teams, and each have to carry a large tube through an obstacle course. They pass the challenge and earn $4,000, raising the jackpot to $110,660.; The Arena: The celebrities, playing in pairs, must place twelve boxes between their bodies. The two pairs that lose the final round are nominated for elimination.
20	20	"Advertido"	August 14, 2023	1.02
Locura del León: The celebrities have to kick ten balls through the hoops of the net. They fail and lose $4,000, bringing down the jackpot to $106,660.; The Arena: The celebrities, playing in teams, must tilt their mazes to place the four white balls in the baskets in the corners. The game continues until four celebrities are nominated for elimination.; Safety Competition: The nominees must memorize a color pattern and correctly replicate it. Julia wins the final round is saved from elimination.; Elimination: The celebrities vote for five nominees they want to save and the two with the fewest votes will be eliminated. Isa received the most votes and is safe. Sebastián did not receive any votes and is the first to be eliminated, with Juan Pablo being the second elimination of the night.
21	21	"Mujeres peligrosas"	August 15, 2023	0.98
Dania, Isa and Manelyk are randomly chosen to play the third challenge of Fortuna, and are informed that they must nominate a celebrity for elimination.: Fortuna: In the first challenge, the celebrities roll coins up a ramp and into the fountain. Each coin is worth $1,000 and they manage to accumulate $21,000. In the second challenge, six celebrities must lift planks that the others can step on to cross from the starting ladder to the platform at the end of the course. They win the challenge and earn $10,000. In the third stage, Dania, Isa and Manelyk each have 4 minutes to pull two chests out of the pool using a crane and place it on the platform. They fail to retrieve all six chests and lose $4,000. The game ends with the jackpot at $133,660.; Dania, Isa and Manelyk nominate Potro for elimination.
22	22	"Nada personal"	August 16, 2023	0.95
¿Vas o no vas?: In the first stage, Macky has 4 minutes to assemble three towers with the nuts and is only able to use the bar with her mouth to move the nuts, she wins the challenge and earns $3,000. In the second stage, Douglas plays against the Fox and each rolls the dice that determines the number of balls they must put into the urn, whoever drops a ball will lose. Douglas wins and earns $3,000. In the third stage, Isa and Potro have 5 minutes to build a tower with the discs and boards until they reach the indicated height. They fail the challenge and lose $3,000. The game ends with the jackpot up to $136,000.; Locura del León: The celebrities, in pairs, must put themselves inside sacks and have 10 minutes to go around the course to bring back all twelve sandbags. They win the challenge and earn $4,000, raising the jackpot to $140,660.; The Arena: In teams, the celebrities must search the arena to find the pieces to build the route of their map. In the final round, the losing team is nominated for elimination.
23	23	"Resistencia"	August 17, 2023	0.89
¿Vas o no vas?: In the first stage, Lozada puts his head inside a tank with cold water and must use mouth to remove the three pieces from the labyrinth, he wins and earns $3,000. In the second stage, Polo must arrange his board pieces so that each column has a single color, he fails and loses $2,000. In the third stage, Karely manages to solve two out of three matchstick puzzles and earns $3,000. The game ends with the jackpot at $144,660.; The Arena: Each player must cut a wooden log and place it in the structure to assemble the step that takes the players of their team to the other side. In the final round, the losing team is nominated for elimination.; Safety Competition: The nominees must hold a swing with one hand and with the other they must build a tower by placing six cubes on their base. Potro wins the final round and is saved from elimination.; Elimination: The celebrities vote for four nominees they want to save, the one with the fewest votes will be eliminated. Isa received the most votes and is safe, while Fernanda received the fewest votes and is eliminated.
24	24	"Entre lágrimas y risas"	August 18, 2023	0.87
¿Vas o no vas?: In the first stage, Rey must flip a bottle and let it fall down standing up until he beats the Fox, he fails and loses $3,000. In the second stage, Ana has 4 minutes to hammer the three nails to the indicated size on each nail, she fails and loses $3,000. In the third stage, Kim competed against the Fox to throw twenty discs and aim them at the different holes in the box. Kim earned the most points and won $3,000. The game ends with the jackpot down to $141,660.; Locura del León: The celebrities must make at least 15 baskets by jumping from the launching platform. They win the challenge and earn $6,000, raising the jackpot to $147,660.; The Arena: The celebrities, playing in teams, must get on a hexagon and roll it to the end line. Once they do so, the others must pull the ropes to return the hexagon and climb on it. In the final round, the losing team is nominated.
25	25	"Las cuentas no cuadran"	August 21, 2023	0.87
Locura del León: The celebrities have 13 minutes to transport balloons through spiky arches, with at least six balloons reaching the finish line intact. They win and earn $4,000, raising the jackpot to $151,660.; The Arena: One player from each team must shoot a ball in the basket. As the ball goes down the chute, the player in turn must run to collect the seven chips scattered in the sand. Then, they must return to the platform and pick up the ball before it hits the ground to run to the end of the course. In the final round, the losing team is nominated for elimination.; Safety Competition: The nominees must put together their puzzle the fastest. Esteban wins the final round and is safe from elimination.; Elimination: The celebrities vote for six nominees they want to save and the two with the fewest votes will be eliminated. Suavecito and Macky received the most votes, each receiving fifteen votes. Manelyk and Dania received the fewest votes, each receiving nine votes, and are eliminated.
26	26	"La Hacienda tiembla"	August 22, 2023	0.89
Esteban, Isa and Rafael are randomly chosen to play the third challenge of Fortuna, and are informed that they must vote for one competitor to re-enter the competition.: Fortuna: In the first challenge, the celebrities are divided into three wagons that have 14 coins, which have a value of $1,000 each. They must toss the coins into a box to counterbalance the barriers and unblock the path. Once the three barriers are lifted, the celebrities in the first wagon must pull the rope to reach the finish line. They manage to earn $3,000. In the second challenge, the celebrities have 10 minutes to get twenty-five balls into the basket at the end of the course using paddles to pass them to each other, they win and earn $15,000. In the third stage, Esteban, Isa and Rafael have four minutes each to must build a ladder using four steps and climb to retrieve their flag. Isa fails to retrieve her flag and loses $3,000. Rafael and Esteban manage to retrieve their flags and earn $9,000. The game ends with the jackpot up to $175,660.; Esteban, Isa and Rafael vote for Manelyk to re-enter the competition.
27	27	"Divide a ver qué pasa"	August 23, 2023	0.62
Joker: The celebrities must bounce a ping pong ball the indicated number of times. Polo won the Green Joker medal which gives him the power to exchange a nominated celebrity, including himself, for one who is safe. However, it must be used within the next two eliminations.; Locura del León: The celebrities form pairs and one of them wraps the other player completely in bandages. They must crawl across the field to cross the finish line in 5 minutes. They pass the challenge and win $4,000, raising the jackpot to $179,660.; The Arena: The celebrities must assemble a puzzle without leaving spaces on the board. They can only transfer one puzzle piece at a time. The game continues until four celebrities are nominated.
28	28	"Después del tornado"	August 24, 2023	0.89
¿Vas o no vas?: In the first stage, Esteban must hold a tray with 40 ping pong balls and in one jump get on the stack of boxes. At the end he is able to conserve at least 10 balls and wins $3,000. In the second stage, José must roll coins across a table so that they enter through the openings and land three of them, he fails and loses $3,000. In the third stage, Glenda competes against the Fox to throw their string to get the ring on the hook. Glenda fails and loses $3,000. The game ends with the jackpot at $176,660.; The Arena: The Lion calls out a color and the celebrities must stand on the corresponding squares to stay safe. The final three players left in the game are nominated for elimination.; Safety Competition: The nominees stand on their balance station and shoot three billiard balls into their basket. Brandon wins the final round and is safe from elimination.; Elimination: The celebrities vote for five nominees they want to save, the one with the fewest votes will be eliminated. Bebeshita and Potro received the most votes, each receiving 17 votes. A tie breaking vote is held between Karely and Kim, with the former being eliminated.
29	29	"Por tu culpa"	August 25, 2023	0.83
Macky does not sleep in her assigned room and is fined $5,000, bringing the jackpot down to $171,660.: ¿Vas o no vas?: In the first stage, Julio must hold onto the door frame, using only his legs and back without touching the floor, and has 3 minutes to collect 10 figures with a magnet. Julio wins and earns $3,000. In the second stage, Rafael has 4 minutes to build a five-story tower with a deck of cards, he fails and loses $3,000. In the third stage, Julia plays against the Fox to fit the eight swords of different sizes into the correct slots, she beats the Fox and earns $3,000. The game ends with the jackpot at $174,660.; Locura del León: The celebrities must line up holding hands and have six minutes to pass as many hula hoops from one end to the other. Afterwards, they must insert at least eight hula hoops towards the bars. They win the challenge and earn $4,000, raising the jackpot to $178,660.; The Arena: Each team selects a player to be a ball thrower, the square where the ball lands indicates how many places the player in turn will be able to advance on their path. The team that fails to cross their players is nominated for elimination.
30	30	"Al cuadrilátero"	August 28, 2023	0.87
Locura del León: The celebrities have 5 minutes to place the barrels in the correct order in order to get five balls inside the pipes to the end of the chute. They fail the challenge and lose $4,000, bring the jackpot down to $174,660.; The Arena: Divided into three groups, each player must follow the direction of the rope that is tied to their bodies through a hoop to move from one end of the arena to the other. The last player in each group is nominated for elimination.; Safety Competition: The nominees must free the knot blocking access to the trunk where their two balls are. Afterwards, they must carry those balls to the balance station and transfer each of the balls from the top of the seesaw to the basket at the bottom. Ana wins the final round and is safe from elimination.; At the elimination ceremony, Polo decides to use his Green Joker to save himself from elimination and names Julio as his replacement nominee.
31	31	"Las amazonas"	August 29, 2023	0.92
Elimination: The celebrities vote for three nominees they want to save, the three with the fewest votes will be eliminated. Fernando Lozada decides to use his Golden Joker to save Isa from elimination. Lorenzo received the most votes and is safe. José did not receive any votes and is the first elimination of the night. Julio is the second to be eliminated, with Suavecito being eliminated third.; Glenda, Julia and Macky are randomly chosen to play the third challenge of Fortuna and must nominate a celebrity for elimination.: Fortuna: In the first challenge, the celebrities climb into a cart and slide down a ramp to throw four coins and knock down twenty gold bars, each worth $1,000. They knock down all gold bars and earn $20,000. In the second stage, six celebrities must hold the end of a plank, while the others place bags of different weights on the opposite side. The six players must hold the weight deposited for 3 minutes. They fail the challenge and lose $8,000. Glenda, Julia and Macky get on a raised platform and each have ten balls to shoot into three baskets of different values. Julia earns $7,000, Glenda loses $8,000, and Macky loses $9,000. The game ends with the jackpot at $176,660.; Glenda, Julia and Macky nominate Esteban for elimination.
32	32	"Prueba de fe"	August 30, 2023	0.99
¿Vas o no vas?: In the first stage, Brandon and Michelle must take turns placing eight pillars on an unstable base, which can only be stabilized by tightening or loosening the rope. They win the challenge and earn $4,000. In the second stage, Manelyk must sit on a chair and has 3 minutes to spin around ten times without touching the floor, she wins and earns $4,000. In the third stage, Lambda competes against the fox and each one has three pieces and by turns they must move them on the board until they form a correct line of the same color. Lambda fails to beat the Fox and loses $4,000. The game ends with the jackpot at $180,660.; Locura del León: The celebrities must guess the object hidden in an urn in less than 20 yes–no questions. They correctly identify the object and earn $10,000, raising the jackpot to $190,660.; The Arena: In teams of three, one celebrity serves as a guide while the other two must advance on the platforms from the start to the finish line blindfolded. To finish the course, they will be supported only by a plank that will serve as a bridge.
33	33	"Acusaciones y llanto"	August 31, 2023	0.94
Locura del León: The celebrities are handcuffed and in a chain they must complete an obstacle course in less than 4 minutes. They win the challenge and earn $10,000, raising the jackpot to $200,660.; The Arena: The members of each team must put tube son their arms with which they will pick up a pitcher to collect water. Each player must cross the arena to deposit the water in the two containers located at the other end. The losing team of the final round is nominated for elimination.; Safety Competition: The nominees must get two eggs through a wire cage from one side of the cage to the other. Bebeshita won the final round and is safe from elimination.; Elimination: The celebrities vote for three nominees they want to save and the two with the fewest votes will be eliminated. Lorenzo received the most votes and is safe. Isa received the fewest votes and is the first to be eliminated, with Esteban being the second elimination of the night.
34	34	"Cada uno por su lado"	September 1, 2023	0.94
Locura del León: The celebrities have 6 minutes to line up six rows of buckets of the same color. They win the challenge and earn $10,000, raising the jackpot to $210,660.; ¿Vas o no vas?: In the first stage, Kim must stand on a balance beam and has 2 minutes to hook the 20 kg geometric objects one by one to fit them into their corresponding spot, she wins and earns $3,000. In the second stage, Bebeshita and the Fox take turns to place puzzle pieces on an unstable platform. The first one to drop the pieces is the loser. Bebeshita beats the Fox and wins $3,000. In the third stage, Brandon must insert two sticks through the holes of a basket to move five golden balls to the container next to him. He is only able to move four balls and loses $3,000. The game ends with the jackpot at $213,600.; The Arena: The celebrities are divided into three groups and individually must find five billiard balls of their assigned color in the maze. The loser of each group is nominated for elimination.
35	35	"El triunfo de la perseverancia"	September 4, 2023	0.98
Locura del León: The celebrities have 8 minutes to collect at least fifteen balls that are inside the balloons. The balloons must be moved from one side of the field to the other using sheets and can only be popped using the spike on the helmets. The win the challenge and earn $7,000, raising the jackpot to $220,660; The Arena: In a game of ring toss, each celebrity must use the rope to swing and throw their rings to the wooden tower. The celebrities are divided into four groups and the player of each group who has the least number of rings in their tower is nominated for elimination.; Safety Competition: The nominees must transport five balls across the table from the starting point to the basket while keeping the table in balance so that each ball dodges the holes and obstacles along the way. Brandon won the final round and is safe from elimination.; Elimination: The celebrities vote for five nominees they want to save, the one with the fewest votes will be eliminated. Glenda, Potro, Bebeshita and Rey received the most votes, each receiving 11 votes. Michelle received the fewest votes and is eliminated.
36	36	"Enviados al exilio"	September 5, 2023	0.94
Glenda, Kim and Rafael are randomly chosen to play the third challenge of Fortuna and must choose a female and male player to exile for 48 hours.: Fortuna: In the first challenge, each celebrity must catapult two sacks onto a board, the target where the sack lands indicates the amount of money earned. In the end, they manage to earn $11,900. In the second stage, the celebrities must find stones of different colors that correspond to their respective trunks. Afterwards, they must carry the trunks and put them in the same colored square to transport them to the top of the pit. They win the challenge and earn $7,000. In the third stage, Glenda, Kim and Rafael must untie the puzzle pieces attached to the raised structure one by one and cross the platform to place them on their respective frames. Kim builds her puzzle and wins $3,000. Glenda fails to build her puzzle and loses $4,000. Rafael builds his puzzle and wins $5,000. The game ends with the jackpot up to $243,560.; Glenda, Kim and Rafael choose to banish Ana and Polo, who must sleep outdoors, cannot enjoy the luxuries of the estate and can only come out of exile to play in the challenges.
37	37	"Donde más duele"	September 6, 2023	0.97
The Lion informs Douglas and Macky that they will not be able to play in the Joker competition due to removing their microphones to have a conversation, and that $10,000 will removed from the jackpot.: Joker: The celebrities must knock down the targets using a slingshot. If a players fails to hit a target they are eliminated from the challenge. Ana wins the blue Joker medal that can be used to save herself or another player in one of the next two eliminations.; ¿Vas o no vas?: In the first stage, Potro must use a hammer to hit the lever and make the bell of the tower ring at least three times, he wins and earns $4,000. In the second stage, Rey competes against the Fox to get his six billiard balls into the spots at the end of the table first. Rey fails to and loses $4,000. In the third stage, Ana has 6 minutes to fit six T-shaped pieces inside a container, she fails the challenge and loses $4,000. The game ends with the jackpot down to $229,560.; The Arena: The celebrities must pass through the ropes to the other end of the structure to knock down the three totem poles of their assigned colors. The loser of each group is nominated for elimination.
38	38	"Exigencia desesperada"	September 7, 2023	0.80
¿Vas o no vas?: In the first stage, Lambda and Lorenzo must hold up a wooden block with a press, while Lambda uses his other hand to roll sixteen coins to Lorenzo. They win the challenge and earn $4,000. In the second stage, Douglas pushes a billiard ball that will roll around the table and must land in the spot indicated by the markers, he fails and loses $4,000. In the third stage, Macky has 4 minutes to successfully complete an electric maze, she fails and loses $4,000. The game ends with the jackpot down to $225,560.; The Arena: Playing in pairs, one player retrieves puzzle pieces from the opposite side of the arena and carry them back through a tunnel, while the other builds the puzzle. The losing pair of each round is nominated for elimination.; Safety Competition: The nominees remove one by one the five tiles found in the maze at the bottom the pool and use them to build a tower. Potro wins the final round and is safe from elimination.; Elimination: The celebrities vote for four nominees they want to save, the one with the fewest votes will be eliminated. Lorenzo, Macky and Rafael received the most votes, each receiving 11 votes, and are safe. Rey received the fewest votes and is eliminated.
39	39	"Puñalada por la espalda"	September 8, 2023	0.96
Locura del León: Four players get on a raised structure and have to put balls between sticks to make them fall down to the other players, who will use their bodies to move the balls into the baskets. The celebrities successfully collect all 25 balls and win $10,000, raising the jackpot to $235,560.; ¿Vas o no vas?: In the first stage, Fernando Lozada must wrap a 260-pound chain around his shoulders and hold its weight for 2 minutes, he wins the challenge and earns $4,000. In the second stage, Manelyk has 3 minutes to send a billiard ball into the hole at least three times using a hanging bat, she fails and loses $4,000. In the third stage, Glenda and Julia have 4 minutes to build a path and roll down the ball to the end basket, they win the challenge and earn $4,000. The game ends with the jackpot at $239,560.; The Arena: The celebrities compete against each other to retrieve a ball from a mud pool. Once a celebrity retrieves the ball they are safe from elimination. The final two celebrities left in the game are nominated for elimination.
40	40	"Lo mío se respeta"	September 11, 2023	1.01
Locura del León: The Rabbits launch different colored balls and the celebrities have 6 minutes to collect them with the basket of the corresponding color. They win the challenge and earn $10,500, raising the jackpot $249,560.; The Arena: Six pairs are divided into two groups. Each member of a pair will be on one side of the wall and with a tray, they must bounce and pass ten balls through the holes until they reach the end of the course. The losing pair of each group is nominated for elimination.; Safety Competition: The nominees enter a rope structure to find three hoops and release them by following the colored ropes corresponding to the hoops. Lambda wins the final round and is safe from elimination.; Elimination: The celebrities vote for three nominees they want to save, the two with the fewest votes will be eliminated. Potro received the most votes and is safe. Polo received the fewest votes and is the first to be eliminated, with Kim being the second elimination of the night.
41	41	"Entre alimañas"	September 12, 2023	1.08
Fernando Lozada, Glenda and Julia are randomly chosen to play the third challenge of Fortuna and must nominate a celebrity for elimination. Fortuna: In the first challenge, the celebrities have 15 minutes to use a wheelbarrow to transport as many sacks through an obstacle course. Each sack is worth $1,500. They manage to collect $27,000. In the second stage, the celebrities have 8 minutes to transport twenty vases from one table to another using a giant hoop as means of transportation, they win the challenge and earn $10,000. In the third stage, Lozada, Glenda and Julia climb an 80-foot structure with a bag containing ten sacks and must land at least three of them to their assigned bases. Julia throws from 30-feet and fails to land any sacks and loses $4,000. Lozada throws from 50-feet and lands his three sacks and wins $5,000. Glenda throws from 65-feet and only lands two sacks and loses $6,000. The game ends with the jackpot at $281,560.
42	42	"Tácticas macabras"	September 13, 2023	1.04
Fernando Lozada, Glenda and Julia nominate Potro for elimination.: Joker: The celebrities throw a ball over a wavy platform and try to get it on the red mark. If a player fails to get the ball on the mark they are eliminated. Douglas wins the green Joker medal that can only be used in the next elimination.; ¿Vas o no vas?: In the first stage, Rafael has 3 minutes to free a chain locked by twelve padlocks by finding the correct keys, he fails and loses $4,000. In the second stage, Brandon competes against the Fox, each one has five chips that they must throw with an rubber band to send them into their opponent's side. Brandon wins and earns $4,000. In the third stage, Lozada has one minute to build a pyramid with two pieces of wood, he wins and earns $4,000. The game ends with the jackpot at $285,560.; The Arena: The celebrities, playing in teams, throw balls into the opposing team's goal to knock down the coins hanging from their structure. The losing team of the final round is nominated for elimination.
43	43	"La moneda de cambio"	September 14, 2023	0.91
Locura del León: The celebrities must launch themselves through the slide and reach the other side of the pool in a single boost. They win the challenge and earn $10,000, raising the jackpot to $295,560.; The Arena: The celebrities are divided into groups and each player is tied to a counterweight that they must lift to run to find the keys buried in the arena. With these keys they will be able to release the colored pennants that are attached to the structure. The two players who fail to release their flags the fastest in the final round will be nominated.; Safety Competition: The nominees have different pieces to build a track on the platform. Afterwards, they will have to slide three cars from the top of the track to the designated parking spots. Brandon wins the final round and is safe from elimination.; Elimination: The celebrities vote for four nominees they want to save, the one with the fewest votes will be eliminated. Potro, Bebeshita and Rafael received the most votes, each receiving eight votes. A tie breaking vote is held between Julia and Lambda, with the latter being eliminated
44	44	"Apoyos circunstanciales"	September 15, 2023	0.96
Locura del León: The celebrities must get 40 golden spheres out of the circle by shooting them with balls and each celebrity gets three shots. They fail the challenge and are punished to sleep without mattresses and pillows.; ¿Vas o no vas?: In the first stage, Ana has 2 minutes to break three shelves of a structure using only one hand to control the wrecking ball, she wins and earns $4,000. In the second stage, Lorenzo and the Fox take turns to put weight on a platform that is tied to a balloon, the first one to drop the balloon will be the loser. Lorenzo fails and loses $4,000. In the third stage, Manelyk uses a steering wheel to control a vertical maze and has 6 minutes to get two red and two purple balls to the holes corresponding to their color. She fails and loses $4,000. The game ends with the jackpot down to $291,560; The Arena: The celebrities are divided into four groups of three. Each player gets on an unstable platform and has 6 minutes to stack five coins on each of the corner bars. The loser of each group is nominated for elimination.
45	45	"Atados por la palabra"	September 18, 2023	1.04
¿Vas o no vas?: In the first stage, Bebeshita uses a hair dryer to transport three pong pong balls through four hoops and into a jar, she fails and loses $4,000. In the second stage, Glenda and the Fox each take turns drawing sticks from a ring, whoever makes the ring fall is the loser. Glenda beats the Fox and earns $4,000. In the third stage, Potro presses 24 switches until 12 bulbs are lit and has 4 minutes to find the correct combination, he fails and loses $4,000. The game ends with the jackpot down to $287,560.; The Arena: The celebrities are divided into two groups of four and they each have 5 minutes to stack 13 pieces on their base. The player in each group who has placed the fewest pieces is nominated for elimination.; Safety Competition: The nominees use three steps to build and climb a rope ladder. The player who takes down their flag first is the winner. Rafael wins the final round and is safe from elimination.; Elimination: The celebrities vote for four nominees they want to save, the one with the fewest votes will be eliminated. Potro received the most votes and is safe, while Glenda received the fewest votes and is eliminated.
46	46	"Decretar los sueños"	September 19, 2023	1.07
Locura del León: The celebrities search for objects that the Lion asks them to find and collect at least 6 of the 11 items requested. They win the challenge and earn $10,000, raising the jackpot to $297,560.; The Lion informs the celebrities that there will no longer be elimination ceremonies and that the Arena challenge will now be an elimination challenge, meaning that whoever loses the challenge will be automatically eliminated.: Safety Competition: The celebrities transport five balls from their starting basket to the tray at the end of a seesaw. They will carry them one by one while keeping their balance on the seesaw bar. The winner of each group is safe from elimination.; The Arena: The celebrities fill their buckets with water to carry them down the rope to the other side of the course. Afterwards, they drop the water to fill three containers and make the ball float from one container to the other until it lands in the sand. The losing player of each group competes in the final round. Manelyk loses the final round against Ana and is eliminated from the competition.
47	47	"Una justa injusta"	September 20, 2023	1.01
Locura del León: The top 10 celebrities have 5 minutes to exchange nine balls across a catwalk while the rabbits throw punching bags and splash water on them. They win the challenge and earn $10,000, raising the jackpot to $307,560.; Safety Competition: The celebrities drop a ball down a slide and calculate the exact moment to release a toy truck and get the ball to land on its open-box bed. The player in each group who fails to land two balls in their truck will be the loser and compete in the Arena.; The Arena: The celebrities must climb on one of the cubes to build a two-story path with the remaining 30 cubes. The path leads them to the launch area from where they must throw six hoops into the tubes. The losing player of each group competes in the final round. Bebeshita loses the final round against Brandon and is eliminated from the competition.
48	48	"Otro corazón roto"	September 21, 2023	0.91
¿Vas o no vas?: In the first stage, Macky sits on a structure to hold a bucket with her feet for 3 minutes in which sand will fall, she can relieve the weight by scooping sand out with a shovel full of holes. Macky wins and earns $5,000. In the second stage, Douglas must reproduce five sound sequences played by the Fox on glasses, he fails and loses $5,000. In the third stage, Fernando competes against The Fox to fill a frame with different shaped pieces, with the pieces being unable stick out of the frame. Fernando wins and earns $5,000. The game ends with the jackpot at $312,560.; Safety Competition: The celebrities must remove one by one the cubes that are on the rope to build a wall inside the frame. Afterwards, they have to maneuver the ropes to activate the demolition weight with which they demolish their wall. The winner of each group is safe from elimination.; The Arena: The celebrities use the letters that make up the phrase "Los Cincuenta" to form 12 words of at least four letters. In the final round, Ana and Rafael use the letters of the phrase "El Eliminado" to form 11 words of at least four letters. Rafael loses the round and is eliminated from the competition.
49	49	"Todo está por definirse"	September 22, 2023	1.01
Locura del León: The celebrities are locked in a cage and have 10 minutes to retrieve the three keys using a hook and free themselves. The win the challenge and earn $15,000. The final amount of the grand prize jackpot is $327,560.; Safety Competition: Playing in pairs, one celebrity enters a chest that fills up with water. After one minute, the other player can draw water with a bucket to prevent the level from rising too fast. Once the water overflows the grate, the player in the chest must submerge and whoever manages to stay underwater the longest wins. Julia and Potro win the final round and are safe from the first Arena challenge.; The Arena: In the first challenge, each celebrity builds a ten-story tower and once it is assembled, they will have to knock it down by launching balls at it with a slingshot. Macky loses the final round against Lorenzo and is eliminated from the competition. In the second challenge, the remaining seven celebrities throw a log to hit their totem and make it move forward until it crosses over the finish line. Julia's totem is the last to cross the finish line and she is eliminated.
50	50	"Guerreros a la expectativa"	September 25, 2023	1.30
The Arena: The Lion surprises the top six celebrities with a final opportunity to earn money for the jackpot. Each player has 4 coins, each worth $4,000, that they toss and try to land on a structure in the fountain. They manage to earn $20,000, ending the jackpot amount at $347,560.; Finale: Jacqueline Bracamontes interviews Ana, Brandon, Douglas, Lorenzo, Fernando Lozada, and Potro as they look back on their best moments throughout the competition. Ana is the most voted player by the audience and is crowned the winner of the season, with Lozada as runner-up.
