= Destination X (British TV series) =

British reality competition series

- Genre: Reality competition
- Based on: Destination X (Flanders)
- Written by: Scott Bennett; Christine Rose
- Directed by: Byron Archard
- Presented by: Rob Brydon
- Opening theme: The Golden Spoon by Bleeding Fingers
- Country of origin: United Kingdom
- Original language: English
- No. of series: 1
- No. of episodes: 10

Production
- Executive producers: Dan Adamson; David Clews; Saul Fearnley
- Production company: Twofour

Original release
- Network: BBC One
- Release: 30 July 2025 – present

Related
- Destination X (United States); Destination X (Netherlands)

Destination X is a British television game show created by the BBC. The series is hosted by Welsh actor and comedian Rob Brydon. The series debuted on 30 July 2025.

== Production ==
The series was an Albert Certified Production. A crew of 190 people was used to film the series, which involved two specially fitted-out coaches travelling more than 11,000 km (6875 miles).

The two coaches used in the series had opaque windows which could be briefly made transparent by the production team at the flick of a switch. One coach was used for day time travel with luxury seats (and a toilet). A second coach was fitted out as sleeping quarters for the contestants, with bunk beds. A third vehicle was used to transport portable toilets.

Great care was taken to avoid giving unplanned clues to the contestants. They were chaperoned between vehicles wearing blackout goggles.

== Contestants ==
The thirteen contestants competing in the first series of Destination X were revealed on 30 July 2025.

Ages, names and cities stated as of time of filming
Contestant	Age	Hometown	Occupation	Finish
Mahdi Nacer	22	London, England	Content creator	Walked (Episode 1)
Deborah Rayner	62	Lytham St Annes, England	Crime writer	Eliminated 1st (Episode 1)
Dawn McAllister	33	Derry, Northern Ireland	Care assistant	Eliminated 2nd (Episode 2)
James Martin-Harper	23	Manchester, England	E-commerce manager	Eliminated 3rd (Episode 3)
Ben Room	42	Swansea, Wales	Surf school director	Eliminated 4th (Episode 3)
Chloe-Anne Banks	27	Oxford, England	Historian	Eliminated 5th (Episode 4)
Ashvin Zacharia	23	London, England	Economics Graduate	Eliminated 6th (Episode 5)
Nick Butter	35	Cornwall, England	Endurance athlete	Eliminated 7th (Episode 7)
Claire Tidy	51	West Sussex, England	Retired detective sergeant	Eliminated 8th (Episode 8)
Daren Parr	58	London, England	Taxi driver	Eliminated 9th (Episode 9)
Saskia Hayman	25	Birmingham, England	Marketing executive	Third place (Episode 10)
Josh Martin	26	Dartford, England	Pilot	Runner-up (Episode 10)
Judith Magambo	27	Bristol, England	Nuclear engineer	Winner (Episode 10)

=== Progress ===
While only the contestant eliminated was announced on the show, the BBC Facebook account revealed detailed episode results after airing. Results are categorised as follows:

Legend:

The contestant won Destination X
The contestant finished as runner-up.
The contestant finished in third place.
WIN indicates that the contestant placed their X closest to the episode's destination.
WIN indicates that the contestant won a Golden X Pass from winning the challenge in Episode 6
HIGH indicates that the contestant was one of the three contestants closest to the episode's destination, but was not the closest.
IN indicates that the contestant was neither in the top, nor the bottom, and remained in the competition.
RTRN indicates the contestant returned to the competition.
BTM (Bottom) indicates the contestant's X was placed the second furthest from the destination, but they remained on the X Bus.
ELIM (Eliminated) indicates that the contestant was eliminated following a map room.
ELIM (Eliminated) indicates that the contestant was eliminated following a challenge.
QUIT indicates that the contestant voluntarily exited the X Bus.

Contestant	Episode									
Contestant	1	2	3	4	5	6 (Note: The sixth leg featured no elimination. Instead, contestants competed in a challenge for a dinner with their loved one, as well as a Golden X Pass.)	7	8	9	10
Judith	HIGH	BTM	HIGH	WIN	IN	WIN	IMM	BTM	BTM	WINNER
Josh	HIGH	IN	IN	IMM	WIN	IN	HIGH	WIN	WIN	RUNNER-UP
Saskia	BTM	IN	HIGH	IMM	HIGH	IN	WIN	HIGH	HIGH	THIRD PLACE
Daren	IN	HIGH	BTM	IMM	HIGH	IN	IMM	HIGH	ELIM	GUEST
Claire (Note: In episode 3, Ashvin, Chloe-Anne and Claire competed in a challenge to re-enter the competition alongside the current players. Following this challenge, all three re-entered, and James was eliminated.)	ELIM (Note: In episode 1, Ashvin, Chloe-Anne and Claire were eliminated after losing the starting challenge to earn a Boarding Pass)		RTRN	IMM	BTM	IN	IMM	ELIM		
Nick	IN	WIN	WIN	HIGH	IN	IN	ELIM			
Ashvin	ELIM		RTRN	BTM	ELIM					
Chloe-Anne	ELIM		RTRN	ELIM						
Ben	IN	IN	ELIM							
James	IN	HIGH	ELIM							GUEST
Dawn	WIN	ELIM								GUEST
Deborah	ELIM									
Mahdi	QUIT (Note: Madhi voluntarily exited the bus during episode 1.)									

== Destination summary ==
"Destination X" locations for series one (2025)

Episode	Distance travelled	"Destination X" location
1	698 km	Paris, France
2	794 km	Matterhorn, Swiss-Italian Border
3	691 km	Munich, Germany
4	328 km	Salzburg, Austria
5	548 km	Venice, Italy
6	0 km	Venice, Italy
7	279 km	Pula, Croatia
8	728 km	Pisa, Italy
9	834 km	Monte Carlo, Monaco
10	696 km	Spanish Steps, Rome, Italy

== Episodes ==
No.	Original release date	Viewers (millions)
1	30 July 2025	6.65
2	31 July 2025	5.21
3	6 August 2025	5.06
4	7 August 2025	4.50
5	13 August 2025	4.61
6	14 August 2025	4.49
7	20 August 2025	4.54
8	21 August 2025	4.36
9	27 August 2025	4.43
10	28 August 2025	4.53

== Reception ==
Lucy Mangan described the series as a blend of The Traitors and Race Across the World. She describes the challenges as "baffling" with it becoming "slightly hallucinatory and I truly do not know what is going on".
