= Maytee Martinez =

American model & designer (born 1992)

- Born: Maytee Zaray Martinez; March 7, 1992 (age 34); West New York, New Jersey, U.S.
- Occupations: Model; TV personality
- Height: 5 ft 11 in (180 cm)
- Partner(s): Rohan Marley (2024–present; engaged)

Maytee Zaray Martinez (born March 7, 1992) is a Cuban-American model, designer, and TV personality.

Maytee graduated from Miami International University for Art & Design with a bachelor's degree in Fashion Merchandise in 2010. In that year, she was featured on Tyra Banks' site as a finalist for America's Next Top Model.

Maytee was also a contestant on the second season of the E! Network's House of DVF.

== Career ==
=== Modeling ===
As a runway model, Martinez has worked for designers such as Dior, Guess, Valentino, Carolina Herrera, and Roberto Cavalli. She has also modeled at fashion weeks, including the Mercedes Benz Fashion Week, New York Fashion Week, and Miami International Fashion Week.

In March 2012, she was named the Queen (Reina) of New Jersey's annual Cuban American Parade. Maytee represented Cuba in the 2013 World Top Model competition in Hungary and the Top Model of the World competition in Egypt.

=== Designer ===
Maytee is currently working on a new fashion project for 2025.

== Philanthropy ==
Martinez has worked with organizations including Art Hearts Fashion, Aids Healthcare Foundation, Fashion Designers Expo/Let the Runway Meet the Cause, Susan G. Komen.

== Personal life ==
Martinez is the sister of Big Brother 19 winner and The Challenge veteran Josh Martinez.
