= Software business =

Software industry

Software Business is the commercial activity of the software industry, aimed at producing, buying and selling software products or software services. The business of software differs from other businesses, in that its main good is intangible and fixed costs of production are high while variable costs of production are close to zero.

== Types of software businesses ==
Cusumano and Nambisan divide software companies (supplier-side) into service and product companies according to how they conduct business. Popp and Meyer give a more detailed analysis of different types of business models of software companies.

=== Software product business ===
In the Software product business, Software is licensed for installation and execution on a user- or customer-supplied infrastructure. In the software product business, revenues typically originate from selling software upgrades to the customer.

=== Software service business ===
Software services business is a strategy of a software company whose offering consists mainly of services or consulting relating to software development.

==== Characteristics of software services business ====
Generally, business model of a software company can be categorized as a product company, services company or a hybrid between these two models. Software service business can also refer to offering Software as a Service.

Software services business can be categorized into the following categories:

- Companies that provide consultation services related to software business
- Companies that provide software development services as a subcontractor.

==== Service Operations ====
Characteristics of Service Operations that are relevant to software services industry:

- Intangibility: Service is produced instead of tangible product. Therefore, service innovations can be easily copied by competitors.
- Perishability: Human resource intensive services cannot be produced in advance, therefore demand and supply is difficult to manage. This also affects business scalability.
- Heterogeneity: Service encounters are unique and customer needs vary, therefore software services are difficult to standardize and productize. Therefore, service business is also difficult to scale.....

== See also ==
- Business models for open source software
