= Los 50 season 2 =

Los 50
- Season 2
- No. of contestants: 50
- Winner: Robbie Mora
- Runner-up: Roberto Valdez
- No. of episodes: 47

Release
- Original network: Telemundo
- Original release: October 15 – December 9, 2024

Season chronology
- ← Previous; Season 1

The second season of the American reality competition television series Los 50 premiered on Telemundo on October 15, 2024. The season was announced on September 25, 2023. The series follows fifty celebrities as they compete in a series of challenges to win up to $350,000 while isolated from the outside world.

The season concluded on December 9, 2024, with Robbie Mora being crowned the winner of $327,860.

== Twists ==
=== Nomination Event ===
In the Nomination Event, a select group of players participate in this event in which they have the opportunity to nominate other players, either from the same group participating in the event or from the non-participating players in the house.

=== Sunday Competition ===
In the Sunday competition, three players face off in a physical challenge and the players who lose will be nominated for elimination while the winner will have the power to nominate the player of their choice.

=== Monkey's Revenge ===
In the Monkey's Revenge competition, the players who were eliminated during the week compete against each other and the winner will return to the competition knowing who did not vote for them to stay.

=== ¿Vas o no vas? ===
This season in ¿Vas o no vas?, Double or Nothing is introduced where if a player fails a challenge another player can do it again for them and the money initially offered is doubled.

=== Elimination Challenge ===
During the final week, the elimination ceremony is replaced with the elimination challenge, where nominated players compete against each other to stay in the competition. In the previous season, the player who lost the Arena challenge in the final week was automatically eliminated.

== Contestants ==
Fifty celebrities were selected to compete in Los 50. The first group of celebrities was announced on September 18, 2024.

Name	Age	Hometown	Notability	Status	Ref
Robbie Mora	26	Guadalajara, Mexico	TV personality	Winner on December 9, 2024	
Roberto Valdez	36	Mexicali, Mexico	Actor	Runner-up on December 9, 2024	
Nahomi Mejía	37	Costa Rica	Model	Third place on December 9, 2024	
Paola Villalobos	28	Mexico	TV personality	Fourth place on December 9, 2024	
Miguel Arce	40	Lima, Peru	Actor	Fifth place on December 9, 2024	
Fabián Ríos	44	Curití, Colombia	Actor	Eliminated on December 9, 2024	
Jeni de la Vega	31	Mexico	Model	Eliminated on December 8, 2024	
William Mora	33	San Pablo, Costa Rica	Personal trainer	Eliminated on December 6, 2024	
Ana Lago	29	Monterrey, Mexico	Gymnast	Eliminated on December 5, 2024	
Eduardo Barquín	26	Toluca, Mexico	Actor	Eliminated on December 4, 2024	
Paola Peña	33	San Pedro Sula, Honduras	Athlete	Eliminated on December 3, 2024	
Kenta Sakurai	35	Mexico City, Mexico	Model	Eliminated on December 2, 2024	
Aleida Núñez	43	Lagos de Moreno, Mexico	Actress and singer	Eliminated on November 28, 2024	
Francisco Bolívar	39	Bogotá, Colombia	Actor	Withdrew on November 25, 2024	
Sebastián Villalobos	28	Bucaramanga, Colombia	Influencer	Eliminated on November 21, 2024	
Nievelis Gonzalez	25	Puerto Rico	Internet personality	Eliminated on November 21, 2024	
Ara Saldívar	31	Ciudad Victoria, Mexico	Singer & actress	Withdrew on November 21, 2024	
Johanna Fadul	39	Bogotá, Colombia	Actress	Withdrew on November 21, 2024	
Víctor Noriega	52	Mexico City, Mexico	Actor	Withdrew on November 21, 2024	
Jonathan Islas	42	Mexico City, Mexico	Actor	Eliminated on November 18, 2024	
Rogelio Martínez	47	Sinaloa, Mexico	Singer	Eliminated on November 17, 2024	
Ferny Graciano	28	Mexico City, Mexico	Actress	Eliminated on November 15, 2024	
Karishna Ayala	33	Puerto Rico	Model	Eliminated on November 14, 2024	
Ana Carolina Castillo	39	Dominican Republic	Influencer	Eliminated on November 13, 2024	
Leslie Gallardo	24	León, Mexico	Reality television star	Eliminated on November 8, 2024	
Athenea Pérez	28	Murcia, Spain	Beauty pageant titleholder	Eliminated on November 7, 2024	
Mati Álvarez	28	Puebla, Mexico	Athlete & businesswoman	Eliminated on November 7, 2024	
Yarishna Ayala	33	Puerto Rico	Bodybuilder	Eliminated on November 6, 2024	
Kelvin Noé Rentería	31	Dallas, Texas	Reality television star	Eliminated on November 4, 2024	
Luis Carpizo	30	León, Mexico	Fitness model	Eliminated on November 1, 2024	
Zelma "Curvy" Cherem	33	Mexico City, Mexico	TV personality	Eliminated on November 1, 2024	
Federico Díaz	47	Uruguay	Actor	Withdrew on November 1, 2024	
José Luis Verdugo	40	Tijuana, Mexico	MMA fighter	Eliminated on October 31, 2024	
Josh Martinez	30	Homestead, Florida	Reality television star	Eliminated on October 30, 2024	
Juanse Quintero	36	Bogotá, Colombia	Actor and singer	Eliminated on October 30, 2024	
Bruce Santillán	26	Guadalajara, Mexico	TV personality	Eliminated on October 28, 2024	
Alfredo Adame	66	Guadalajara, Mexico	TV host & producer	Eliminated on October 25, 2024	
Tostao Valencia	43	Quibdó, Colombia	Singer	Eliminated on October 25, 2024	
Carolina Tejera	48	Caracas, Venezuela	Actress	Eliminated on October 25, 2024	
Tefi Valenzuela	34	Arequipa, Peru	TV personality	Eliminated on October 24, 2024	
Fernando Alonso	45	Santiago de Querétaro, Mexico	Actor	Eliminated on October 24, 2024	
Emma Mizrahi	28	Miami, Florida	TV personality	Eliminated on October 21, 2024	
Romina Marcos	29	Yucatán, Mexico	Reality television star	Eliminated on October 18, 2024	
Rubén Díaz	33	Madrid, Spain	TV personality	Eliminated on October 18, 2024	
Elaine Haro	21	Mexico City, Mexico	Singer & actress	Eliminated on October 18, 2024	
Dennhi "La Bala" Callu	29	San Diego, California	TV personality	Withdrew on October 18, 2024	
Liz Gallardo	44	Guadalajara, Mexico	Actress	Eliminated on October 17, 2024	
Eduardo Antonio "El Divo"	54	Placetas, Cuba	Singer & actor	Eliminated on October 16, 2024	
Marcelia Figueroa	26	Mexico	Actress	Eliminated on October 15, 2024	
Marco Valdes	38	Mexico	Actor	Eliminated on October 15, 2024	

== Elimination table ==
Place	Contestant	Elimination ceremonies																			Elimination challenges							Finale
Place	Contestant	1	2	3	4	5	6	7	8	9	10	11	12	13	14	15	16	17	18	19	20	21	22	23	24	25	26	Finale
1	Robbie	Safe	Safe	Safe	Safe	Safe	Safe	Safe	Safe	Safe	Safe	Safe	Safe	Safe	Safe	Nominated	Nominated	Safe	Safe	Nominated	Nominated	Safe	Nominated	Safe	Safe	Safe	Immune	Winner
2	Roberto	Safe	Safe	Safe	Immune (Note: Karishna won the Sunday Competition and granted Roberto immunity in this round.)	Safe	Safe	Safe	Nominated	Safe	Safe	Eliminated		Safe (Note: Roberto won the Monkey's Revenge competition and returned to the competition.)	Safe	Safe	Safe	Safe	Safe (Note: Roberto was nominated for elimination in the Nomination Event, however he used his Transfer Joker on himself and transferred his nomination to Fabián.)	Safe	Safe	Safe	Safe	Safe	Safe	Safe	Safe	Runner-up
3	Nahomi	Safe	Safe	Safe	Safe	Safe	Safe	Safe	Safe	Safe	Safe	Safe	Safe	Safe	Safe	Safe	Safe	Safe	Safe	Safe	Safe	Nominated	Safe	Nominated	Safe	Safe	Immune	3rd place
4	Paola V.	Safe	Safe	Safe	Safe	Safe	Safe	Safe	Safe	Safe (Note: Paola lost the Arena challenge and was nominated for elimination, however Nievelis used her Safety Joker to save her.)	Safe	Safe	Safe	Safe	Nominated	Nominated	Nominated	Nominated	Safe	Safe	Safe	Safe	Safe	Nominated	Safe	Safe	Immune	4th place
5	Miguel	Safe	Safe	Safe	Safe	Safe	Safe	Safe	Safe	Safe	Nominated	Safe	Safe	Safe	Nominated	Safe	Safe	Safe	Nominated	Safe	Safe	Safe	Nominated	Safe	Nominated	Safe	Immune	5th place
6	Fabián	Safe	Safe	Safe	Safe	Safe	Nominated	Safe	Safe	Safe	Safe	Safe	Safe	Safe	Safe	Nominated	Eliminated		Safe (Note: Fabián won the Monkey's Revenge competition and returned to the competition.)	Safe	Safe	Safe	Safe	Safe	Nominated	Safe	Eliminated	
7	Jeni	Safe	Safe	Safe	Safe	Safe	Safe	Safe	Safe	Safe	Safe	Safe	Safe	Safe	Safe	Nominated	Safe	Safe	Eliminated		Safe (Note: Jeni won the Monkey's Revenge competition and returned to the competition.)	Nominated	Safe	Safe	Safe	Eliminated		
8	William	Safe	Safe	Nominated	Safe	Safe	Safe	Safe	Safe	Safe	Safe	Safe	Safe	Safe	Safe	Safe	Safe	Safe	Nominated	Safe	Safe	Safe	Safe	Safe	Eliminated			
9	Ana L.	Safe	Safe	Safe	Safe	Safe	Safe	Safe	Safe	Safe	Safe	Safe	Safe	Safe	Eliminated				Safe (Note: Ara used her Rescue Joker to bring Ana back to the competition.)	Safe	Safe	Safe	Safe	Eliminated				
10	Eduardo B.	Safe	Safe	Safe	Nominated	Safe	Safe	Safe	Safe	Safe	Safe	Nominated	Nominated	Safe	Safe	Safe	Safe	Safe	Nominated	Nominated	Nominated	Safe	Eliminated					
11	Paola P.	Safe	Safe	Safe	Safe	Safe	Nominated	Safe	Safe	Safe	Safe	Safe	Safe	Safe	Safe	Safe	Safe	Safe	Safe	Nominated	Safe	Eliminated						
12	Kenta	Safe	Safe	Safe	Safe	Nominated	Nominated	Safe	Safe	Safe	Safe	Safe	Safe	Safe	Nominated	Safe	Immune (Note: Kenta won the Sunday Competition and received immunity in this round.)	Safe	Safe	Safe	Eliminated							
13	Aleida	Safe	Safe	Safe	Safe	Nominated	Safe	Safe	Nominated	Safe	Safe	Safe	Safe	Safe	Safe	Nominated	Safe	Nominated	Nominated	Eliminated								
14	Francisco	Safe	Safe	Safe	Safe	Safe	Safe	Nominated	Safe	Nominated	Nominated	Safe	Nominated	Eliminated			Safe (Note: Francisco won the Monkey's Revenge competition and returned to the competition.)	Nominated	Withdrew									
15	Sebastián	Safe	Safe	Safe	Safe	Nominated	Safe	Safe	Safe	Nominated	Safe	Safe	Safe	Safe	Safe	Safe	Safe	Eliminated										
16	Nievelis	Safe	Safe	Safe	Safe	Safe	Safe	Safe	Safe	Safe	Safe	Safe	Safe	Safe	Safe	Safe	Safe	Eliminated										
17	Ara	Safe	Safe	Safe	Safe	Nominated	Safe	Eliminated			Safe (Note: Ara won the Monkey's Revenge competition and returned to the competition.)	Safe	Safe	Safe	Safe	Safe	Safe	Withdrew										
17	Johanna	Safe	Safe	Safe	Nominated	Safe	Safe	Safe	Safe	Safe	Safe	Safe	Safe	Safe	Safe	Safe	Nominated	Withdrew										
17	Víctor	Safe	Nominated	Safe	Eliminated			Safe (Note: Víctor won the Monkey's Revenge competition and returned to the competition.)	Safe	Safe	Safe	Nominated	Nominated	Nominated	Safe	Safe	Nominated	Withdrew										
20	Jonathan	Safe	Safe	Safe	Safe	Safe	Nominated	Safe	Nominated	Safe	Safe	Safe	Safe	Nominated	Safe	Safe	Eliminated											
21	Rogelio	Safe	Safe	Safe	Safe	Safe	Safe	Safe	Safe	Safe	Safe	Nominated	Safe	Nominated	Safe	Eliminated												
22	Ferny	Safe	Nominated	Safe	Safe	Safe	Nominated	Safe	Safe	Safe	Nominated	Safe	Safe	Safe	Nominated	Eliminated												
23	Karishna	Safe	Safe	Safe	Safe	Safe	Nominated	Safe	Nominated	Safe	Safe	Safe	Safe (Note: Karishna lost the Arena challenge and was nominated for elimination, however Francisco used his Exchange Joker to save her and named himself as the replacement nominee.)	Safe	Eliminated													
24	Ana Carolina	Safe	Safe	Safe	Safe	Safe	Nominated	Nominated	Safe	Safe	Nominated	Safe	Nominated	Nominated	Eliminated													
25	Leslie	Safe	Safe	Safe	Safe	Safe	Safe	Nominated	Safe	Nominated	Safe	Safe	Eliminated															
26	Athenea	Safe	Safe	Safe	Safe	Safe	Safe	Safe	Safe	Nominated	Nominated	Eliminated (Note: In the elimination ceremony, Athenea received eleven votes to remain in the competition. However, she wanted to be voted out due to her medical problem, as she refused to withdraw. The next day, the Lion gave the players who had voted to keep her the opportunity to change their vote. Every player changed their vote to eliminate her.)																
27	Mati	Safe	Safe	Safe	Safe	Safe	Safe	Safe	Safe	Safe	Safe	Eliminated																
28	Yarishna	Nominated	Eliminated		Safe (Note: Roberto used his Return Joker to bring Yarishna back to the competition.)	Safe	Safe	Safe	Safe	Nominated	Eliminated																	
29	Kelvin	Nominated	Safe	Safe	Safe	Safe	Nominated	Safe	Safe	Safe	Eliminated																	
30	Luis	Safe	Safe	Safe	Safe	Nominated	Safe	Safe	Safe	Eliminated																		
31	Curvy	Nominated	Safe	Safe	Nominated	Nominated	Safe	Safe	Safe	Eliminated																		
32	Federico	Safe	Nominated	Safe	Safe	Safe	Safe	Safe	Safe	Withdrew																		
33	José Luis	Safe	Safe	Safe	Safe	Safe	Safe	Safe	Eliminated																			
34	Josh	Safe	Safe	Safe	Safe	Safe	Safe	Safe	Eliminated																			
35	Juanse	Safe	Safe	Safe	Safe	Safe	Safe	Safe	Eliminated																			
36	Bruce	Safe	Safe	Nominated	Safe	Safe	Safe	Eliminated																				
37	Alfredo	Safe	Nominated	Nominated	Safe	Safe	Eliminated																					
38	Tostao	Safe	Safe	Safe	Safe	Safe	Eliminated																					
39	Carolina	Safe	Nominated	Safe	Safe	Safe	Eliminated																					
40	Tefi	Safe	Safe	Safe	Safe	Eliminated																						
41	Fernando	Safe	Safe	Nominated	Safe	Eliminated																						
42	Emma	Safe	Safe	Safe	Eliminated																							
43	Romina	Safe	Safe	Eliminated																								
44	Rubén	Safe	Safe	Eliminated																								
45	Elaine	Nominated	Safe	Eliminated																								
46	La Bala	Safe	Safe	Withdrew																								
47	Liz	Safe	Eliminated																									
48	Divo	Eliminated																										
49	Marcelia	Eliminated																										
50	Marco	Eliminated																										

Notes

The celebrity was nominated for elimination.
The celebrity was nominated, however, won the safety competition and was safe from elimination.
The celebrity was nominated for elimination, however, was saved by a Joker.
The celebrity was immune from elimination.
The celebrity was eliminated from the competition.
The celebrity withdrew from the competition.

== Episodes ==
No. overall	No. in season	Title	Original release date
51	1	"El León invita a una nueva aventura"	October 15, 2024
The Lion welcomes fifty new celebrities to his estate and gives them their first challenge to earn money for the jackpot, which started at $20,000. To restore the water supply of the estate, the celebrities had eight minutes to assemble a new piping system by finding pipes inside three mud pools. Fifteen players entered each pool to search for the pieces, while the renaming five players assembled the pipes. They won the challenge and earned $10,000, raising the jackpot to $30,000: The Arena: The celebrities were thrown balls by the Lion's assistants and the first eight to be hit by a ball or to step off the game area were nominated for elimination.; Safety Competition: Divided in two groups, the nominees built a tower using seven bins and climbed to activate their powder cannon. In the final round, Ara and Kelvin built a 7-level ladder with the bins and then threw a sack onto a platform. Ara won the challenge.; Elimination: The celebrities voted for four nominees they wanted to save and the three with the fewest votes were eliminated. Marco received the fewest votes and is the first to be eliminated, with Marcelia being the second elimination. The episode concludes on a cliffhanger on whether El Divo or Curvy will be eliminated.
52	2	"Las alianzas dividen la Hacienda"	October 16, 2024
Elimination: At the conclusion of the elimination ceremony, El Divo was the third eliminated celebrity from the competition.; Locura del León: The celebrities have ten minutes to collect tomatoes, squeeze the juice out with their feet, and fill eight containers with the juice. They passed and earned $8,000, raising the jackpot to $38,000. Afterwards, they each had to drink a cup of juice and the ten players to do it the slowest were sent to the Nomination Event.; ¿Vas o no vas?: In the first stage, Luis held a metal bar for three minutes while the Fox added weight to the buckets on the sides of the bar; he passed and won $3,000. In the second stage, Bruce and the Fox took turns removing daggers from the table. They could remove up to three daggers at a time and whoever took the last dagger lost the duel. Bruce failed to win any duels and lost $3,000 from the jackpot.; Nomination Event: The losers of the second part of Locura del León each drew a card that would determine who would nominate another player. Karishna drew the Nominate a Player at the Table card and nominated Yarishna. Carolina drew the Nominate a Player in the House card.
53	3	"Adame mueve sus piezas"	October 17, 2024
Following the Nomination Event, Carolina nominated Alfredo for elimination.: The Arena: The players walked around the game circle while the rabbits beat their drums. When the music stops the players passed through a rope structure to find a chair in the center of the circle. In the final round, the players started in the center of the circle and went out to find chairs while blindfolded. The six players left without a chair were nominated.; Safety Competition: The nominees rotated their platform to release six gears over their head. They used the gears to assemble the mechanism that raised their flag. Juanse won the challenge.; Elimination: The celebrities voted for five nominees they wanted to save and the two with the fewest votes were eliminated. Alfredo received the most votes of the night. Liz received the fewest votes and is eliminated. A tie breaking vote is held between Víctor and Yarishna.
54	4	"Las mujeres se empoderan"	October 18, 2024
Elimination: After a tie-breaking vote between Victor and Yarishna, the latter is eliminated from the competition.; The Arena: In each round, the Lion indicated how many players were to step on the barrels. The barrels that did not have the indicated number of players or those who did not get on a barrel went to the nomination round.; La Bala must withdraw from the competition for medical reasons.: Safety Competition: The nominees built a tower using cups and when instructed by the Lion they could knock down the tower of their opponents with a slingshot. The first player to complete their tower would be safe from elimination. Jeni won the challenge.; Elimination: The celebrities voted for four nominees they wanted to save and the three with the fewest votes were eliminated. William received the most votes and is safe. Elaine is the first elimination of the night. Rubén is the second to be eliminated, with Romina being eliminated third.
55	5	"Domingo de alto impacto"	October 20, 2024
Locura del León: Each player climbed the launching platform and rolled their ball down the ramp with the goal of landing in the marked holes with points. They scored 7,000 points in total and earned $10,000, raising the jackpot to $48,000. Alfredo, Karishna and Sebastián scored the most points, scoring 700 points each, and were able to compete in the Sunday Challenge.; Joker: The players shot a ball, dodged the rotating obstacle and made a basket. If a player failed to make a basket they were eliminated from the challenge. Roberto won the Return Joker which gave him the power to bring back an eliminated player to the competition.; Sunday Competition: Alfredo, Karishna and Sebastián competed for the power to grant immunity to the player of their choice. They were suspended at a height of fifteen meters and each threw forty hoops to insert them into the poles while the Lion's assistants spun them around. Karishna won and gave immunity to Roberto until the next elimination.; Roberto used the Return Joker to bring Yarishna back to the competition.
56	6	"Yarishna busca a los traidores"	October 21, 2024
The Arena: Players picked a number in the circle, with each number appearing twice. The players, upon hearing their number, took their baton, ran outside the circle until reaching their starting place and entered the center of the circle. The first player who managed to place their baton on the flagpole was safe from elimination. In the nomination round, the remaining players were blindfolded and the males searched for two hexagon figures and the females searched for two arrow figures, which were buried in the sand. The first two male and two female players to find their corresponding figures were safe.; Safety Competition: The nominees were suspended at a height of ten meters and had to release their banner, which was attached to the structure. The keys to release their banners were inside iron pieces on the ground that they retrieved using a hook. Alfredo won the challenge.; Elimination: The celebrities voted for three nominees they wanted to save and the two with the fewest votes were eliminated. Curvy received the most votes and is safe. With only eleven votes, Emma is the first to be eliminated. The episode concludes on a cliffhanger on whether Johanna or Víctor will be eliminated.
57	7	"Johanna y Víctor frente a frente"	October 22, 2024
Elimination: With only fifteen votes, Víctor is eliminated from the competition.; Locura del León: Players had fifteen minutes to find two rubber ducks each in the yard, pass the over the bridge in the pool and deposit the ducks in the spot with their names. They only collected 33 out of 80 ducks and lost $8,000, lowering the jackpot to $40,000.; ¿Vas o no vas?: In the first stage, Mati had three minutes to spin a hamster wheel thirty times. She only managed to spin it twenty-four times and the Lion offers a Double or Nothing where Robbie volunteered to re-do the challenge for $6,000; he passes the challenge. In the second stage, William launched a ball to bounce it off the walls and score at least three times in the moving goal in four minutes; he passes the challenge and earns $3,000. The game ends with the jackpot up to $49,000.; Nomination Event: Ten select male players were divided into two teams. Each team decided which player they wanted to nominate for elimination and the opposing team had to guess the identity of the chosen nominee by asking questions. If a team correctly identified the nominee, the player is effectively nominated.
58	8	"Hombres al borde de un ataque"	October 23, 2024
Nomination Event: In the first round, the red team wrongly guessed Luis as the purple team's nominee and Josh was nominated instead. In the second round, the purple team wrongly guessed Kelvin as the purple team's nominee and Luis was nominated instead. In the third round, the purple team guessed correctly that Sebastián was the purple team's nominee.; The Arena: In the first round, players were divided into three teams. Each team threw darts at the other side of a wall and popped their opponents' balloons. They were guided by their team captain, who was on the side of the wall with the balloons. The team with the most popped balloons were sent to the nomination round. In the nomination round, the remaining players were divided into two teams and the players of the team with the most popped balloons were nominated.; Safety Competition: The nominees used a gutter to score balls into their baskets. The player to do so the fastest was safe from elimination. Josh won the competition.
59	9	"Ha llegado la carta"	October 24, 2024
Elimination: The celebrities voted for six nominees they wanted to save and the two with the fewest votes were eliminated. Curvy received the most votes and is safe. With only ten votes, Fernando is the first to be eliminated. Tefi is the second to be eliminated.; ¿Vas o no vas?: In the first stage, Paola went on a swing and solved a sliding puzzle by placing the pieces in numerical order. The swing was held in the air with a rope by José Luis. They won $3,000. In the second stage, Peña and the Fox took turns placing wooden pieces on a board and whoever was unable to add another piece lost the round. Peña beat the Fox and earned $3,000. The game ends with the jackpot up to $55,000.; Locura del León: Players have ten minutes to clean two buses and find twenty-eight hidden words, arrange them to form two situation puzzles that will lead them to decipher a series of numbers that will open the locks on the bus doors and allow them to enter the buses. They earned $8,000, raising the jackpot to $63,000.; Nomination Event: Alfredo, Mati and Tostao each picked three players to save from nomination. Afterwards they each nominated two players for elimination. The cards of the six nominated players were then flipped over and three were randomly picked. Kelvin, Kenta and Paola Peña were nominated.
60	10	"Una Arena que nadie olvidará"	October 25, 2024
The Arena: The celebrities are divided into two teams. The players were tied to their opponents with a rope and had to pull to drag their opponents and reach the ball. The team that reached the ball first was entitled to take shots and the team that filled its column with seven balls was safe.; Safety Competition: The nominees began by removing the nut from the bolt using their tongues. The first four to free the nut advanced to the next stage of the competition. In the next stage, they put the nut on the golden hook using only their mouth. Afterwards, they took out four more nuts with their mouths to put on the same hook. Rogelio won the competition.; Elimination: The celebrities voted for eight nominees they wanted to save and the three with the fewest votes were eliminated. Kenta and Peña received the most votes and are safe. Carolina is the first to be eliminated, with Tostao being the second elimination of the night. A tie breaking vote is held between Alfredo and Jonathan, with the former being eliminated.
61	11	"Traición, lágrimas y revancha"	October 27, 2024
Joker: The players walk across a log that is over a lake to ring the bell at the other end. Nievelis won the Safety Joker which can save her or another celebrity from elimination.; Sunday Competition: Aleida, Leslie and Rogelio each picked a player to nominate and were suspended at a height of fifteen meters and made their balls move through the gutters and down to their basket. Leslie won and effectively nominated Ana Carolina, while Rogelio came in third and was nominated himself.; Locura del León: The players had fifteen minutes to find fourteen clocks hidden around the estate and break them using a hammer. They passed the challenge and won $10,000, raising the jackpot to $73,000.; Monkey's Revenge: The eliminated players of the week stacked blocks to form a single tower. Each player chose the block to be placed by their opponent and whoever knocked down the tower was eliminated. Carolina and Víctor compete in the final round.
62	12	"La daga negra"	October 28, 2024
Monkey's Revenge: In the final round, Víctor beats Carolina and he returns to the competition.; The Arena: In teams, players build a bridge by using the correct steps to reach the other side of the arena. In the nomination round, the team that fails to build their bridge is nominated for elimination.; Safety Competition: The players used balloons to make the basket that was underwater float. The first three players to retrieve their rings from the basket advanced to the second stage where they needed to insert ten rings in their pole. Rogelio won the competition.; Elimination: The celebrities voted for three nominees they wanted to save and the two with the fewest votes were eliminated. Francisco received the most votes and is safe. With only fifteen votes, Bruce is the first to be eliminated. The episode concludes on a cliffhanger on whether Ara or Leslie will be eliminated.
63	13	"Emociones al límite"	October 29, 2024
Elimination: With only fifteen votes, Ara is eliminated from the competition.; Locura del León: Players have fifteen minutes to learn a dance routine and win at least five of the eight dance battles against the Foxes. They fail the challenge and players were punished by being handcuffed in pairs or trios.; ¿Vas o no vas?: In the first stage, Curvy has five minutes to maneuver the rollers to push the ball and transport it to the basket; she fails the challenge and loses $3,000. In the second stage, Juanse has three minutes to find the correct path to move one by one the three game pieces to the end of the labyrinth, he wins and earns $3,000. The game ends with the jackpot at $73,000.; Nomination Event: Kenta received the safety chest, took a coin and passed the chest to the player of his choice so that they will also receive a coin and so forth until there are no more coins. Ana Carolina, Johanna and Juanse did not receive a coin and the Lion reveals that they are safe from elimination, in addition they are able to nominate two players of their choice; they nominated Aleida and Roberto.
64	14	"Engaño y traición"	October 30, 2024
The Arena: In each round, one blindfolded player is the tracker while the rest of the players are the prey. The tracker has two minutes to catch a player and identify them. In the last three rounds, the tracker names the player they want to identify and has three minutes to find them in the circle.; Safety Competition: The nominees are tied to a cylinder with a retractable rope that will spin the cylinder. They placed one by one ten billiard balls on the cylinder without knocking them down. The winning pair of the first round competed against each other in the final round. Leslie won the competition.; Elimination: The celebrities voted for four nominees they wanted to save and the three with the fewest votes were eliminated. Karishna and Roberto received the most votes and are safe. With only nine votes, Juanse is the first elimination of the night while Josh is the second to be eliminated. The episode concludes on a cliffhanger on whether Aleida or José Luis will be eliminated.
65	15	"Estrategia perfecta"	October 31, 2024
Elimination: With only fifteen votes, José Luis is eliminated from the competition.; Locura del León: Three players per round were spun on a platform and had to complete a task, each worth between $1,000 and $3,000. The game ends with the jackpot up to $76,000.; ¿Vas o no vas?: In the first stage, Kelvin must hang from a structure and spin it to wind the rope out of the barrel in less than four minutes; he wins and earns $5,000. In the second stage, Fabian competes against the Fox and in turns they selected a container to pour all their liquid into the vase. Each container had a different amount of liquid and whoever overflowed the vase was the loser; he failed to beat the Fox and lost $4,000. The game ends with the jackpot at $77,000.; Nomination Event: Nine select players each picked a card and they had to guess which player possessed the card with the word spy on it. Paola received the most votes but she was not the spy. Mati was the spy and received only two votes against her and was able to nominate a player of her choice; she nominated Paola.
66	16	"Renuncia inesperada"	November 1, 2024
Nomination Event: In the second round, Fabián received the most votes but he was not the spy. Yarishna was the spy and nominated Miguel.; The Arena: Four players per team used a sack to knock down their opponents as they run along a balance beam. In the nomination round, the remaining players carried balls while running along the beam. The team with the fewest balls collected was nominated for elimination.; Safety Competition: The nominees memorize a color pattern and then correctly replicate it. Miguel won the competition.; Elimination: The celebrities voted for six nominees they wanted to save and the two with the fewest votes were eliminated. Nievelis used her Safety Joker to save Paola from elimination. Francisco received the most votes and is safe. With only eight votes, Curvy is the first elimination of the night. A tie breaking vote is held between Luis and Sebastián, with the former being eliminated.
67	17	"Nuevas alianzas remecen la Hacienda"	November 3, 2024
Locura del León: The rabbits threw down twenty-eight sacks and players must retrieve at least fifteen of them. The collected all the sacks and won $12,000, raising the jackpot to $89,000.; Joker: Players must stay on the suspension bridge for as long as possible, while the Léon's assistants move it from side to side. In the final round, players must walk across the bridge without falling off. Francisco won the Exchange Joker which gives him the power to exchange a nominated player for a player that is safe before elimination.; Sunday Competition: Kelvin, Nievelis and Peña launch themselves down the zipline and throw bags to knock down their opponents' boards. Nievelis won and nominated William for elimination, while Kelvin came in third and was nominated himself.; Monkey's Revenge: In a fencing-like duel, each player is represented by a figure and whoever manages to pop their opponent's balloon wins the duel. In the final round, Ara defeated Juanse and she returned to the competition.
68	18	"La nueva Ara"	November 4, 2024
The Arena: In teams, players carry water balloons with their mouths, pop them into the container that another player is carrying on their head which they will pour into the tube to float the sticks. With the sticks they removed a disc from the recipient. The losing team was nominated for elimination.; Safety Competition: The nominees began the challenge tied to a pole with a rope. They must untangle themselves to make it across the line and the first four players to do so advanced through the tunnels. The first two players to go through the tunnels moved on to the final stage where they had to wave their ropes to get the four hoops out of the tube.; Elimination: The celebrities voted for five nominees they wanted to save and the two with the fewest votes were eliminated. Miguel received the most votes of the night. With only nine votes, Kelvin is the first elimination of the night.
69	19	"Robbie pide una segunda oportunidad"	November 6, 2024
Elimination: At the conclusion of the elimination ceremony, Yarishna was eliminated from the competition.; The Arena: In pairs, players dance and when the music stops they have ten seconds to get on the platform and imitate the Rabbits' pose, placing only one foot on the platform. In each round, the pair that lasts the longest on the platform is safe.; Safety Competition: The nominees carry six eggs one by one across a slippery platform. Once the eggs are at the end of the platform, they must swing on the beam to place four eggs in their lane. Johanna won the competition.
70	20	"Athenea y la hora de la verdad"	November 7, 2024
Elimination: The celebrities voted for four nominees they wanted to save and the two with the fewest votes were eliminated. Rogelio received the most votes and is safe. Mati is the first to be eliminated, with Roberto being eliminated second.; Locura del León: Players have fifteen minutes to water twelve pots and emerge the flowers. They win the challenge and earn $12,000, raising the jackpot to $101,000.; ¿Vas o no vas?: In the first stage, Ara has three minutes to transport two balls from the table to each basket using an upside down cup; she wins and earns $4,000. In the second stage, Eduardo Barquin played a matching game against the Fox; he beats the Fox and wins $4,000. The game ends with the jackpot up to $109,000.; The Lion gives the eleven players who voted in the previous elimination ceremony to keep Athenea in the game the opportunity to change their vote and eliminate her, as she has not been feeling well and does not want to withdraw. The players voted unanimously to eliminate her.
71	21	"El Joker de Francisco"	November 8, 2024
The Arena: Each team had five minutes to collect as many gold balls as possible while avoiding being hit by the larger balls thrown by the opposing team.; Safety Competition: The nominees used a hook to move a Rabbit figure across the sliding maze. Jonathan won the competition.; Elimination: The celebrities voted for four nominees they wanted to save and the player with the fewest votes was eliminated. Francisco used his Exchange Joker to save Karishna from elimination and named himself as the replacement nominee. Ana Carolina received the most votes and is safe, while Leslie received the fewest and is eliminated.
72	22	"Esperada venganza"	November 10, 2024
Joker: Players position themselves on a line and when the traffic light changes color they must move to the correct side of the line. Paola wins the Double Theft Joker which gives her the power to steal the votes of two players during the elimination.; Locura del León: Players have ten minutes to transport fifty newspapers, each worth $3,000, by riding a scooter down the ramp and placing the newspapers in the mailbox. They collected thirty-nine newspapers and earned $11,700, raising the jackpot to $120,700.; Sunday Competition: Jonathan, Rogelio and Víctor launch themselves from the top of a structure and swing as they throw three sacks at the target. The player with the most points after three rounds is the winner. Jonathan won and nominated Rogelio for elimination, while Víctor came in third and was nominated himself.; Monkey's Revenge: The eliminated players remove six shapes from a cube and whoever manages to do so in the shortest time advances in the competition. In the final round, Roberto defeated Kelvin and returned to the competition.
73	23	"Roberto y Fabián frente a frente"	November 11, 2024
The Arena: In each 5-minute round, one team chases their opponents to remove the handkerchiefs tied to their belts. The teams that collect the most handkerchiefs are safe.; Safety Competition: In the first round, the nominees started out entangled with their own team and find a way to unravel the knot until everyone's rope is free. Upon achieving this, they must balance to knock down the three barrels. The winning team competed against each other in the final round.; Elimination: The celebrities voted for four nominees they wanted to save and the player with the fewest votes was eliminated. With no votes, Francisco was eliminated from the competition.
74	24	"La drástica decisión de Francisco"	November 12, 2024
Locura del León: The players launch themselves with a punching bag to reach the platform located in the center of the pool. They failed the challenge and had to choose three players to be locked in a cage; Ara, Kenta and Robbie were chosen.; ¿Vas o no vas?: In the first stage, Nahomi had to use her feet to touch and identify at least five objects from seven mystery boxes; she wins and earns $5,000. In the second stage, Ana uses her hands and feet to hang on the walls and avoid touching the floor. She uses a pendulum hanging from her waist to transport three balls to the finish line; she wins and earns $5,000. The game ends with the jackpot up to $130,700.; Nomination Event: Six select players spun a roulette wheel that would determine whether they themselves would be nominated, nominate another player or save a player from nomination. The event concludes when three players are nominated. Robbie nominates Ferny, while Fabián saves Jeni.
75	25	"Triple eliminación"	November 13, 2024
Nomination Event: Roberto nominates Miguel for elimination, while Ara nominates Ana Lago.; The Arena: Two players compete against each other and must take the handkerchief when instructed by the Lion, with the loser going to the nomination round. In the nomination round, the remaining players must retrieve the handkerchief of the color indicated by the Lion and the player who fails to retrieve one is nominated.; Safety Competition: The nominees place themselves inside a tube and roll around the course, where they search for bags of different weights, which they place on a scale to balance it. Rogelio won the competition.; Elimination: The celebrities voted for four nominees they wanted to save and the three with the fewest votes were eliminated. With no votes, Ana Carolina was the first elimination. Ana Lago was eliminated second.
76	26	"El acumulado avanza lento"	November 14, 2024
Elimination: With only six votes, Karishna is eliminated from the competition.; ¿Vas o no vas?: In the first stage, Sebastián competes against the Fox to place five billiard balls in the holes of their tray, guiding the balls by steering the platform; he beats the Fox and wins $5,000. In the second stage, Jonathan memorizes a set of chess pieces in a specific order and must replicate it in the correct order; he fails and Lion offers a Double or Nothing, which the players reject. The jackpot remains at $130,700.; Locura del León: The players have ten minutes to go down a slide to the finish line. Before sliding, they pick up a card and imitate the pose it indicates while sliding down. They win and earn $15,000, raising the jackpot to $145,700.; Nomination Event: Six select players participate in the event in which two of them are nominated. Each player is represented by a different color of balls. In the safety round, players remove a number of balls, determined by the dice, from the lottery drum to reduce the chance of their competitors from winning safety. The Rabbits turn the lottery drum with the remaining balls and Fabián is safe.
77	27	"El Joker de Paola"	November 15, 2024
Nomination Event: At the end of the safety round, Peña is safe. In the nomination round, the four remaining players must take balls from their opponents' containers and place them in the lottery drum to increase their chances of being nominated. Paola and Ferny are nominated.; The Arena: In pairs, players build a tower of barrels using a pulley system. Afterwards they climb it and from the top throw sandbags into the baskets.; Safety Competition: The nominees walk the balance beams while knocking down totem poles placed on each side using a helmet with a ball hanging from it. Johanna wins the competition.; Elimination: The celebrities voted for five nominees they wanted to save and the two with the fewest votes were eliminated. Paola used her Joker to steal William and Sebastián's votes. Jeni and Paola received the most votes of the night. With only four votes, Ferny is eliminated.
78	28	"Jardín al límite"	November 17, 2024
Locura del León: In teams of three, players search for the Lion's treasure chests, filled with money, scattered across the property. They earn $13,660, raising the jackpot to $159,360.; Joker: The players must bounce a ping pong ball at least once on the steps to land it in the container. Ara won the Rescue Joker which gives her the power to rescue an eliminated player before they leave the elimination room.; Sunday Competition: Kenta, Nievelis and Robbie move a metal pole through the maze without touching the edges. Kenta won and received immunity from the next Arena challenge, while Nievelis came in third and nominated Ara.; Monkey's Revenge: The eliminated players place red marbles on one side of their board, leaving only the separate blue marble at the bottom. Francisco wins and returns to the competition.
79	29	"Traición y eliminación"	November 18, 2024
The Arena: In teams, each player throws a ball across the board to one of the colored areas indicated by the Lion. The team with the most balls within the colored area has the right to save a player. In the nomination round, the ten remaining players compete individually.; Safety Competition: The Lion calls out a category and in turn the nominees must go through the letters and choose one to say a word that begins with it. Ara won the competition.; Elimination: The celebrities voted for four nominees they wanted to save and the two with the fewest votes were eliminated. Paola and Robbie received the most votes and are safe. With four votes, Jonathan is eliminated.
80	30	"Sebas en el ojo del huracán"	November 19, 2024
Elimination: With only five votes, Fabián is eliminated from the competition.; ¿Vas o no vas?: In the first stage, Kenta must hold on to a wall with an increasing inclination for three minutes; he falls off and loses $5,000. In the second stage, Nievelis must remove three snakes of the color indicated by the die from the table before the Fox stops her with the cup; she wins and earns $3,000. The game ends with the jackpot down to $157,360.; Locura del León: The players move three beds through an obstacle course, while one player lies on each bed. They win and earn $15,000, raising the jackpot to $172,360.; Nomination Event: The players are divided into two groups and each group chooses a player that will have a chance to save themselves; Nahomi and Johanna are picked. With eleven votes, Nahomi is safe but must nominate a player for elimination; she nominates Sebastián.
81	31	"Todo por el acumulado"	November 20, 2024
¿Vas o no vas?: In the first stage, Miguel must catch ten sticks in the air that randomly fall from the tubes; he wins and earns $5,000. In the second stage, Roberto must counterbalance at one end of the beam and move Jeni from side to side so that she can reach the tiles and place them in the correct order; they earn $5,000. In the third stage, Aleida inflates balloons and throws them like a rubber band so that at least five of them cross the hoop; she wins and earns $5,000. The game ends with the jackpot up to $187,360.; Locura del León: Each player enters a giant inflatable sphere and has thirty seconds to knock down the bowling pins, each valued at $500. They manage to collect $28,000, raising the jackpot to $215,360; Nomination Event: The Lion asks a series of questions about the players' personal opinions of each other and the players write down what the majority of them believe. Those who get it right move up one square. The event ends when a player reaches the last square. Paola gets to the last square and nominates Miguel.
82	32	"Una inesperada noticia"	November 21, 2024
The Lion informs the players that Ara, Johana and Víctor have withdrawn from the competition for medical reasons.: The Arena: In pairs, one player is the wolf and the other the sheep. The sheep crosses the arena while wearing bells and when the gong sounds they must stop so that the blindfolded wolf can shoot them with balls. If a sheep is hit, they are sent to the nomination round, but if they manages to cross the arena, the wolf is sent instead. In the nomination, the six remaining players knock down the totems of their assigned color and the first two to do so are safe.; Safety Competition: The nominees are held in place by five ropes secured with nuts of different shapes. To free themselves they must find the keys by diving into the mud. Once they release a nut, they will also release a piece of the puzzle they have to put together. Miguel wins the competition.; Elimination: The celebrities voted for three nominees they wanted to save and the two with the fewest votes were eliminated. Paola received the most votes and is safe. With three votes, Nievelis is eliminated. Sebastián is eliminated second.
83	33	"Un Joker se activa"	November 22, 2024
The Lion informs the players that Ara used her Rescue Joker to bring back Ana Lago to the competition.: ¿Vas o no vas?: In the first stage, Francisco has two minutes to remove clothespins from his suit without using his hands; he wins and earns $5,000. In the second stage, Ana has five minutes to burn ropes with a candle until they are broken; she wins and earns $5,000. In the third stage, Barquín and the Fox use tongs to place wet marbles on paper, which weakens as the weight increases and whoever causes the paper to break will be the loser; Barquín wins and earns $5,000. The game ends with the jackpot up to $230,360.; Locura del León: Players are tied in pairs and have eight minutes to find thirteen numbers hidden in desserts, which will add up to a code that will set them free. They fail and are punished with drinking raw eggs.; Nomination Event: Jeni and Francisco are chosen to be spies and they must nominate a player by placing an X on them in the dark. When the lights are turned on, the nominees must guess which player was the spy that nominated them and if they succeed they will be saved and the spy will be the one nominated. Jeni nominates Miguel and Francisco nominates Roberto. Miguel incorrectly guesses Francisco as his spy and is effectively nominated. Roberto incorrectly guesses Jeni as his spy and is effectively nominated.
84	34	"Una revancha decisiva"	November 24, 2024
Locura del León: Each player has one minute to find the correct cables that open boxes containing coins, each valued at $1,000. They fail to find at least seven coins and lose $6,000, bringing down the jackpot to $224,360.; Joker: Players are placed in a spinning circle and the player who stays on top the longest or the last to fall wins the competition. Roberto wins the Transfer Joker which gives him the power to transfer his own nomination to a player who is safe.; Sunday Competition: Barquín, Francisco and William compete to banish a player of their choice from the estate for 24 hours. They must build a puzzle and when the Lion indicates it, the players chosen to be banished can knock down their puzzle with a slingshot. Barquín wins and banishes Nahomi. Francisco is also banished for coming in third place.; Monkey's Revenge: One by one the players throw a die with colored faces and place the piece of the indicated color on a scale. The first player to make the scale fall loses. In the final round, Fabián defeated Jonathan and returned to the competition.
85	35	"Arena al límite"	November 25, 2024
The Lion informs the players that Francisco quit the competition.: The Arena: The players catch discs thrown by the Lion's assistants. The last two male and two female players who catch five discs are nominated.; Safety Competition: Players must keep a rope tight to stabilize the surface while placing cubes to form a word on it.; Elimination: The celebrities voted for four nominees they wanted to save and the player with the fewest votes was eliminated. Barquín and William received the most votes and are safe, while Jeni received the fewest and is eliminated.
86	36	"Paola dando guerra"	November 26, 2024
Locura del León: Players have three minutes to identify which of their belongings have been stolen by the Rabbits. They manage to identify six items and earn $15,000, raising the jackpot to $239,360.; ¿Vas o no vas?: In the first stage, Paola must catch fifteen plates at the end of a ramp using a plunger; she wins $5,000. In the second stage, William has three minutes to move disks to the farthest pole without moving more than one disk at a time or placing a larger disk on top of a smaller one; he wins $5,000. In the third stage, Peña must place a group of objects in the correct order in less than fifteen turns; she wins $5,000. The game ends with the jackpot up to $254,360.; Nomination Event: Barquín, Fabian and Robbie receive sixteen cards each, while the Lion's assistant has a deck of cards that will indicate what they should do with their cards. When one of them runs out of cards, the player who has the card with the word nominated is effectively nominated. Robbie is left with the nomination card and is nominated.
87	37	"El pacto de las mujeres"	November 27, 2024
Locura del León: One at a time, each player must pop seven balloons with different body parts. The players are unable to complete the task in the time given and lose $7,000, bringing down the jackpot to $239,360.; ¿Vas o no vas?: In the first stage, Ana does a blind taste test and must identify six of the eleven dishes; she fails and loses $5,000. In the second stage, Roberto memorizes a sequence of colored balls and replicates it using the tiles that are in the maze; he fails and loses $5,000. In the third stage, Kenta has four minutes to slide three disks on the table to make them fit through the slots; he wins and earns $5,000. The game ends with the jackpot down to $234,360.; The Arena: The players memorize a game board and take turns to position themselves on a square to activate the trigger of the chosen square. If the square is empty, the player continues to play. If they get red smoke when triggering the square, they will be nominated. If they get gray smoke they will be able to rescue a nominated player once the game is over. Paola, Roberto and William are safe.
88	38	"Hasta el último aliento"	November 28, 2024
The Arena #1: Ana and Miguel rescue each other from nomination, while Fabián rescues Nahomi. In the nomination round, the remaining players must land five rings on the poles and the first two to do so are safe. Aleida, Kenta and Peña are nominated.; The Arena #2: In teams, players have a racquet attached to their waists with which they bounce a ball, passing it from player to player until they make a basket. In the nomination round, Miguel and Ana compete against each other and the latter is nominated.; Safety Competition: The nominees search through a maze in the pool for six pieces needed for their board. Ana wins the competition.; Elimination: The celebrities voted for three nominees they wanted to save and the player with the fewest votes was eliminated. Robbie received the most votes and is safe, while Aleida received the fewest and is eliminated.
89	39	"Risas y llantos"	November 29, 2024
Locura del León: The players face three challenges, each worth $5,000. In the first challenge, players ride a mechanical bull and the minutes they stay on the bull are added up; they surpass the three minutes required. In the second challenge, each player has thirty seconds to enter an inflatable burrow and recover up to three sacks; they collect twenty sacks and pass the challenge. In the third stage, players take turns entering a giant inflatable ball and cross the field to score a goal while the Rabbits try to stop them; they score enough goals and pass the challenge. The game ends with the jackpot up to $249,360; Nomination Event: The Lion asks players to write a letter naming three players they would like to reach the finale with and place it in the chest. Roberto's letter is pulled out and he must choose one of his three players to be eliminated from the competition. Roberto eliminates Peña and the Lion reveals that she is not eliminated but is nominated.; Monkey's Revenge: Aleida and Jeni build a nine-level tower. While building, they also have the opportunity to destroy their opponent's tower. Jeni finishes her tower first and returns to the competition.
90	40	"Una sorpresa inolvidable"	December 1, 2024
The Lion surprises the players with a visit from their friends and families.: ¿Vas o no vas?: Five players are selected to complete a challenge with their guest. Jeni and her friend Aldo maneuver rollers to push a ball and transport it to the basket; they are unsuccessful and lose $500. Kenta and his aunt Sonia manage to remove clothespins from their suits without using their hands and win $500. Barquín and his girlfriend Steph manage to collect 50 bills from the cash grab booth and win $500. Nahomi and her niece successfully place five billiard balls in the holes of their tray and win $500. Patricia, Robbie's mother, catches fifteen plates at the end of a ramp using a plunger and wins $500. The game ends with the jackpot up to $250,860.; Locura del León: The guests dress up as chickens and, guided by the players, have fifteen minutes find sixty eggs found throughout the estate. They win the challenge and earn $15,000, raising the jackpot to $265,860.
91	41	"Los 12 finalistas"	December 2, 2024
Locura del León: The players must knock down twenty vases by rolling a tire down the ramp. They fail the challenge and are punished with the closure of one of the bedrooms for 24 hours.; The Arena #1: In teams of four, the twelve finalists use bases to bounce balls into their baskets and the first two teams to do so are safe. In the nomination round, Jeni and Robbie competed against Paola and William, with the male player of the losing team being nominated. Robbie is nominated.; The Arena #2: In two groups of three, the male players use paddles to transport balls to the launch zone where they will score four balls. The first player in each group to do so is safe. In the nomination round, the remaining players must score two balls. Barquín and Kenta are nominated.; Elimination Challenge: Barquín, Kenta and Robbie launch sacks with a catapult onto the platform and must land at least three of them. Kenta comes in last place and is eliminated.
92	42	"Mujeres en riesgo"	December 3, 2024
The Arena #1: In teams, players cross the wall supported by wooden grips with geometric figures. Once the whole team has reached the other side, each player must knock down two of the supports that are positioned on the bases. Jeni and Paola compete in the nomination round in which they assemble the border of the wall in the form of a jigsaw puzzle. Jeni is nominated.; Locura del León: The players have eight minutes to find the eleven teddy bears with their name on them. They fail the challenge and lose $15,000. The Lion gives the players the chance to regain their money if they are able to carry around their bears for 24 hours.; The Arena #2: The players must stay on a wall for as long as possible and the first one to fall off is nominated. Miguel is nominated in the male round, while Nahomi is nominated in the female round.; Elimination Challenge: Jeni, Nahomi and Peña build a tower with the pieces of the color indicated by the die thrown by the Rabbit. Peña's tower falls down first and she is eliminated.
93	43	"Peligra el acumulado"	December 4, 2024
The Lion informs the players that they passed the previous Locura de León challenge and returns $15,000.: The Arena #1: Male players remove sticks holding balls in a basket while trying to get as few balls as possible to drop. Robbie removes the most balls and is nominated.; Locura del León: Players get on tricycles and have ten minutes to go around the circuit and complete the tasks in order to win $1,000 per task. They earn $9,000, raising the jackpot to $274,860.; The Arena #2: In teams, players inflate a balloon to pop on their opponents' turn. The team captain will use cards to indicate how many times the balloon should be blown up. The player who pops a balloon is out of the competition and the first team to lose all its players will go to the nomination round. In the nomination round, the player that pops their balloon first is safe. Paola and Barquín are nominated.; Elimination Challenge: Taking turns, Barquin, Miguel and Robbie control a machine to pull a piece of their assigned color and place it on their platform in the fastest time. Barquín takes the longest time and is eliminated.
94	44	"Emoción al límite"	December 5, 2024
Locura del León: Miguel is kidnapped by the Rabbits and the players have ten minutes to find a way through all the gates in the garden and complete the challenges behind them to rescue him. They win the challenge and earn $15,000, raising the jackpot to $289,860.; The Arena #1: The female players move seven different objects to the other side of the arena using a stand. Ana comes in last place and is nominated.; The Arena #2: In teams of three, one player throws balls that their teammates catch with the basket attached to their helmets. Nahomi's team loses and she is nominated, while Miguel and William compete in the nomination round in which the player who catches the most balls in three minutes is safe. Miguel is nominated.; Elimination Challenge: Ana, Nahomi and Paola insert pieces into a board and must prevent the pieces from going beyond the board border. Paola wins the first round. Ana and Nahomi compete in the final round, with the former being eliminated.
95	45	"La Arena más polémica"	December 6, 2024
The Arena #1: The male players pass a puck along the path using a cue. Robbie and William compete in the nomination round and the latter is nominated.; The Arena #2: Fabian, Robbie, and Roberto have their heads inside an urn while their female partners fill a bucket of water and deposit it in their opponents' urn. When the urn fills with water, the player inside has to hold his breath. The last player to remove his head from the urn is safe. Fabián and Roberto compete in the nomination round and the former is nominated.; Locura del León: Players have ten minutes to find up to thirty coins hidden in the furniture and bedrooms, winning $500 for each coin found. They find twenty coins and earn $10,000, raising the jackpot to $299,860.; Elimination Challenge: Fabián, Miguel and William are shown silhouettes and they use tiles to replicate them. Miguel is the first to win two rounds and is safe. William loses the final round and is eliminated.
96	46	"Los finalistas"	December 8, 2024
The Arena: The semifinalists search through a ball pit for the ball they need to advance to the finals. Female players search for a gold ball, while male players search for a silver ball. Miguel finds the silver ball and Paola the gold ball and they become finalists.; Qualification Challenge #1: Nahomi and Jeni roll out the fabric from the poles and wrap it around their bodies until they find their key. When they have the key, they must free themselves to reach the chest and get three balls out of it, which they will have to roll through the fabric and score in the basket. Nahomi qualifies for the finale.; Qualification Challenge #2: Fabián, Robbie and Roberto stand on their own platform and have to swing to light a fire using the torch to ignite six atoms and deposit them in the basket. Robbie qualifies for the finale.; Elimination Challenge: Fabián, Jeni and Roberto launch coins onto a platform and the two players with the most coins on it are safe. Jeni is eliminated.
97	47	"Solo uno gana"	December 9, 2024
Locura del León: The players have fifteen minutes to solve a combination puzzle. They win and earn $28,000, ending the jackpot amount at $327,860.; Elimination Challenge: Fabián and Roberto take turns to remove a piece from the tower and place it on top to continue building upwards. Fabián knocks down the tower and is eliminated.; Finale: Jacqueline Bracamontes returns to host the finale and interviews Miguel, Nahomi, Paola, Robbie, and Roberto as they look back on their best moments throughout the competition. Robbie receives the most votes from the audience and is crowned the winner of the season, with Roberto as runner-up.
