= Los 50 =

- Genre: Reality competition
- Based on: Les Cinquante
- Country of origin: United States
- Original language: Spanish
- No. of seasons: 2
- No. of episodes: 97

Production
- Executive producers: Pancho Calvo; María José Barraza
- Camera setup: Multi-camera
- Running time: 64–128 minutes
- Production company: Endemol Shine Boomdog

Original release
- Network: Telemundo
- Release: July 18, 2023 – December 9, 2024

Los 50 is an American reality competition television series that premiered on Telemundo on July 18, 2023. It is an adaptation of the French series Les Cinquante. The series follows a group of contestants living together and competing for the grand prize of US$350,000.

On September 25, 2023, the series was renewed for a second season that premiered on October 15, 2024.

== Format ==
Fifty celebrities live together in a luxurious estate that is isolated from the outside world, as they compete in a series of elimination challenges until one of them wins up to US$350,000. The competition is under the command of a mysterious game master, El León (The Lion), with the help of his assistants: foxes, dogs and rabbits. The series allows viewers to have the opportunity to be part of the game and win cash prizes by supporting their favorite celebrity.

== Competitions ==
=== The Arena ===
In the Arena competition, celebrities compete in the Lion's arena for their safety. Those who lose the competition will be nominated for elimination. This competition is physical in nature.

=== Safety Competition ===
In the Safety competition, the nominated celebrities compete for one last chance to save themselves from elimination. This competition is based on endurance or skill.

=== ¿Vas o no vas? ===
¿Vas o no vas? (Are You In or Out?) is an individual competition allows the celebrities to win money for the grand prize jackpot. The competition is played in three stages of mental and physical challenges, with each stage having a reward. If the celebrities fail a challenge, the money offered is deducted from the jackpot. Three celebrities are handpicked to compete, each doing a different stage. The Lion chooses the celebrity that will compete in the first stage, while the second and third stage competitors are chosen by the celebrity that played the previous stage. A celebrity can refuse the invitation to compete and choose a replacement, however they will lose money from the jackpot.

=== Locura del León ===
Locura del León (Lion's Madness) is a group competition where the celebrities must work together to accomplish a challenge and win money for the jackpot.

=== Fortuna ===
Fortuna (Fortune) is another competition where celebrities can win money for the jackpot. It consists of three challenges, two played as a group and one individually.

=== Nomination Event ===
Introduced in season 2, select players participate in which they draw a card to determine if they will nominate another player for elimination. The cards labeled as "Neutral" have no power. If a player draws the "Nominate a Player at the Table" card, they must nominate a player participating at the event. If a player draws the "Nominate a Player in the House" card, they must nominate a player from the house who is not part of the event.

=== Sunday Competition ===
Introduced in season 2, three players face off in a physical challenge and the players who lose will be nominated for elimination while the winner will have the power to nominate the player of their choice.

=== Revenge Competition ===
Introduced in season 2, the players who were eliminated during the week compete against each other and the winner will return to the competition knowing who voted for them to stay and who didn't.

== Series overview ==
Series overview
Season	Episodes	Originally released		Winner	Runner-up	Jackpot
Season	Episodes	First released	Last released	Winner	Runner-up	Jackpot
1	50	July 18, 2023	September 25, 2023	Ana Parra	Fernando Lozada	$347,560
2	47	October 15, 2024	December 9, 2024	Robbie Mora	Roberto Valdez	$327,860

== Adaptation ==
On 7 December 2025, during the season finale of Bigg Boss 19, it was confirmed that the show is set to air in India with its Hindi adaptation titled The 50 airing on Colors TV and JioHotstar.

== Reception ==
=== Ratings ===
Viewership and ratings per season of Los 50
Season	Timeslot (ET)	Episodes	First aired		Last aired		Avg. viewers (millions)
Season	Timeslot (ET)	Episodes	Date	Viewers (millions)	Date	Viewers (millions)	Avg. viewers (millions)
1	Mon–Fri 7:00 p.m.	50	July 18, 2023	0.96	September 25, 2023	1.30	0.92
2	Sun–Fri 7:00 p.m.	47	October 15, 2024	N/A	December 9, 2024	1.03	N/A

=== Awards and nominations ===
Year	Award	Category	Nominated	Result	Ref
2024	Produ Awards	Best Adapted Reality Competition Series	Los 50	Nominated	
2024	Produ Awards	Best Reality Show Host	Jacqueline Bracamontes	Nominated	
2025	Produ Awards	Best Adapted Skill and Knowledge Reality Series	Los 50	Nominated	
