= Destination X (TV series) =

American reality competition series

- Genre: Reality competition
- Directed by: Ben Archard
- Presented by: Jeffrey Dean Morgan
- Country of origin: United States
- Original language: English
- No. of seasons: 1
- No. of episodes: 10

Production
- Executive producers: Andy Cadman; Jeffrey Dean Morgan; Emanuel Vanderjeugd; Dan Adamson; David Clews
- Production companies: Twofour; Universal Television

Original release
- Network: NBC
- Release: May 27, 2025 – present

Destination X is an American reality competition television series that premiered on NBC on May 27, 2025. The series is hosted by Jeffrey Dean Morgan. In March 2026, the series was renewed for a second season.

== Production ==
On April 5, 2024, it was announced that NBC had ordered the series. On September 19, 2024, the host, Jeffrey Dean Morgan, was announced.

On April 24, 2025, it was announced that the series would premiere on May 27, 2025. The competitors were also announced. An exclusive sneak peek aired on May 3.

On March 3, 2026, it was announced that the series was renewed for a second season. The cast was announced on June 10, 2026 and is expected to be released in 2027.

== Format ==
In this competition series, contestants are sent to Europe and are transported by bus to various locations, while blindfolded. The primary objective is to guess the location to where they have been transported, and games are played along the way to gain clues. The contestant each week whose guess is farthest from their true location is eliminated, and the process is repeated. The last remaining contestant wins $250,000.

== Episodes ==
No.	Title	Original release date	U.S. viewers (millions)	Rating/share (18-49)
1	"Welcome to Destination X"	May 27, 2025	2.10	0.3/4
2	"Take It Up a Notch"	June 3, 2025	2.11	0.3/5
3	"Catching Feelings Changes Everything"	June 10, 2025	1.81	0.2/3
4	"Let the Deceit Begin"	June 17, 2025	1.90	0.2/3
5	"Moral Compass"	June 24, 2025	1.84	0.2/4
6	"The Most Haunted Castle in Europe"	July 1, 2025	1.61	0.2/3
7	"The Clues Were There All Along"	July 8, 2025	1.96	0.3/5
8	"The Knives Are Out"	July 15, 2025	1.93	0.2/4
9	"How's Your Poker Face?"	July 22, 2025	1.82	0.2/4
10	"The Grand Finale"	July 29, 2025	2.08	0.2/4

== Critical response ==
Decider recommended viewers to "stream it," praising the show's scenic locations, Jeffrey Dean Morgan's hosting, and the casting choices. However, they also mentioned that the gameplay could be frustrating and complicated. Reality Blurred criticized the show's focus on social strategy over analysis.

== International versions ==
Legend:

Currently airing franchise
Franchise with an upcoming season
Franchise no longer aired
Status unknown

Country/Region	Local title English title	Network(s)	Winners	Host(s)
Belgium (Flanders)	Bestemming X Destination X (Flagship/Original Edition)	VTM	Season 1, 2023: Gino Passchier; Season 2, 2025: Bart Fatan; Season 3, 2026: Tineke van Ginneken; Season 4, 2027: Upcoming season	Current; Aster Nzeyimana (2–); Former; Kevin Janssens (1–2)
Belgium (Flanders)	Bestemming X-mas; Destination X-mas	VTM	Season 1, 2024: Jef Neve	Kevin Janssens
Denmark	Destination X	DR1	Season 1, 2025: Daniel Madsbøll Steffensen	Søren Pilmark
France	Destination X: sauront-ils se repérer ? Destination X: Will They be Able to Find Their Way?	M6	Season 1, 2023–24: Hélène Bertin; Season 2, TBA: Upcoming season	Current; Olivier Minne (2–); Former; Philippe Bas (1); Jean-Pierre Michaël (Narrator, 1)
Germany	Destination X	ProSieben	Season 1, 2024: Philipp Boy	None
Hungary	Destination X – Hol a fenében vagyunk? Destination X – Where the hell are we?	TV2	Season 1, 2027: Upcoming season	László Palik
Netherlands	Bestemming X Destination X	RTL 4	Season 1, 2024: Julia de Dreu; Season 2, 2026: Iliass Ojja	Nasrdin Dchar
Ukraine	Destination X	Sweet.tv	Season 1, 2026–27: Current season	Dmytro Kadnay
United Kingdom	Destination X	BBC One	Series 1, 2025: Judith Magambo; Series 2, 2027: Upcoming series	Rob Brydon

=== British version ===
A British version of the show aired its first episode on July 30, 2025, with the final episode scheduled to air on August 28, 2025. It is hosted by Rob Brydon and is broadcast on the BBC, with two episodes releasing every week on Wednesday and Thursday. Episodes are available to watch on BBC iPlayer.

== See also ==
- GeoGuessr, a game in which players deduce locations from Google Street View imagery
