= List of Acapulco Shore cast members =

This is a list of cast members who have appeared in Acapulco Shore.

== Cast members ==
Cast member	Quote (Note: The quote shown below from the cast refers to their first season, although each season they change.)	Translation	Series	Episodes (Note: Only includes main seasons.)	Year
Karime Pindter	"No soy virgen pero tampoco soy zorra"	"I'm not a virgin, but I'm not a slut either"	1–10	136	2014–22
Luis "Jawy" Méndez	"Me gustan todas menos gordas"	"I like them all, Except fat"	1–4, 5–7, 10	94	2014–20, 2022
Luis "Potro" Caballero	"Soy súper seductor"	"I'm so seductor"	1–7	87	2014–20
Manuel Tadeo Fernández	"De niño era gordo, ya no soy tan gordo"	"When I was a kid, I was fat, Now I am not too fat"	1–3, 4–7	84	2014–20
Manelyk González	"Ah jejeje"	"Ah jejeje"	1–7	81	2014–20
Juan Fernando Lozada	"Soy el mejor divirtiéndome"	"I'm the best having fun"	1–3, 5–6, 10	61	2014–16, 2018–19, 2022
Talía Loaiza	"Me gusta mucho que me digan flaquita bonita"	"I really like it when they call me flaquita bonita"	1–2, 5–6, 7	43	2014–15, 2018–20
Joyce Islas	"Me encanta la fiesta, me gustan mucho los shots"	"I love the party, I like shots"	1	11	2014
Brenda Zambrano	"No tengo limites, ninguno aun"	"I don't have limits, None yet"	2, 4, 5–6	41	2015, 2017–19
Danik Michell	"Soy difícil pero no imposible"	"I'm hard, But not impossible"	3–4	26	2016–17
Tania Gattas Aranda	"Estas nalgas se defienden solas"	"This buttocks defend by themselve"	3, 4	18	2016–17
Nicole "Nikki" Olin	"Soy casi virgen"	"I'm almost virgin"	3, 4	13	2016–17
Víctor Ortiz	"A este lobo ninguna se le escapa"	"To this wolf none escapes"	NG–4, 5	18	2017–18
Eduardo "Chile" Miranda	"Soy un hippie del futuro"	"I am a hippie from the future"	NG, 5–11	103	2017–23
Alexya Larios	"Ya estoy aquí, te quedan dos deseos"	"I'm already here, you have two wishes left"	NG–4	16	2017
Christian Herrera	"¡Si hay, pero no para todas!"	"¡There is, but no for everyone!"	NG–4	16	2017
Gabriela "Gaby" Ruiz	"El que no se atreve se queda con las ganas"	"Who does not take the risk stays the desire"	NG–4	17	2017
Antonio "Tony" Tiburcio	"Me gustan las buchonas, me encantan las buchonas"	"I liked buchonas, i love buchonas"	NG–4	12	2017
Humbie Vallin	"Esto si esta "Heavy Metal""	"This is if this heavy metal"	NG	4	2017
Luisa Cavazos	"Siempre tiene que haber algo bonito"	"There always has to be something nice"	NG	4	2017
Marlen Martínez	"Me cagan las personas hipócritas y sin personalidad"	"I can not stand hypocritical people and shit people without personality"	NG	4	2017
Sofía Beltrán	"A toda acción corresponde una reacción"	"For each action, a reaction corresponds"	NG	4	2017
Leslie Gallardo	"Duraznito pa' ti, pa' mi, pa' todos"	"Peach for you, for me, for everyone"	5, 11	25	2018, 2023
Maria Usi	"Ah, so sexy"	"Ah, so sexy"	5	12	2018
Erick Sandoval	"¡Se puedo o no se puede!"	"¡Is this possible or not!"	5	7	2018
Jibranne "Jey" Bazán	"Pero de volada cariño"	"Hurry up, honey"	6–8, 9, 11	52	2019–23
Rocío Sánchez	"Las cosas se hacen de tres maneras, a la buena, a la mala y a mi manera"	"Things are done in three ways: Good, bad and my way"	6–7, 9, 10	40	2019–20, 2022
Xavier Meade	"Ya llego la emperatriz de la casa"	"The empress of the house has arrived"	6–7	27	2019–20
Dania Méndez	"Borracha, borracha, pero buena muchacha"	"Drunk, drunk, but good girl"	6–7	26	2019–20
Fernanda "Fer" Moreno	"Ya llegó la licenciada borracha, ¡se aguantan!"	"The drunk lawyer has arrived, you suck it up!"	7–10	52	2020–22
Isabel "Isa" Castro	"Y su lunch favorito está de regreso"	"And your favorite lunch is back"	7–10, 11	48	2020–23
Ignacia "Nacha" Michelson	"!Nunca tristes, siempre locos!"	"Never sad, always crazy!"	7–8	30	2020–21
Alba Zepeda	"¡Lechuga, pero no de cualquier ensalada!"	"Lettuce but not for any salad!"	8–11	56	2021–23
Jacky Ramirez	"No necesitas corona, cuando eres una diosa"	"You don't need a crown when you're a goddess"	8–10	42	2021–22
Jaylin Castellanos	"Ya llegó el rostro más caro de Guadalajara"	"The most expensive face of Guadalajara has arrived"	8–9, 10	26	2021–22
Beni Falcón	"Si vas a vibrar, que sea conmigo"	"If you're going to vibe, let it be with me"	8, 9	24	2021–22
Diego Garciasela	"Güey el after se puso raro y amanecí aquí"	"Dude, the after party went weird and I woke up here"	8–9	21	2021–22
Eduardo "Eddie" Schobert	"Ay noma' pa' lo' quequi"	—N/a	8	8	2021
Matheus Crivella	"E... ¿Você fala portugues?"	"And you speak Portuguese?"	8	6	2021
Charlotte Caniggia	"¿Donde queda Acapulco?"	"Where is Acapulco?"	8	5	2021
Carlos Pantoja	"Yo solo me dedico a hacer felices a las mujeres, jajaja"	"I only dedicate myself to making women happy, jajaja"	9	14	2022
José Rodriguez	"¿Pero quién pidió pollo?"	"But who ordered chicken?"	9	14	2022
Nati Peláez	"Aquí les llegó su paisita mi amor"	"Here comes your paisita my love"	9	14	2022
Santiago Santana	"¿Alguien llamó a la fábrica de muñecos?"	"Did someone call the doll factory?"	9	13	2022
Abel Robles	"¿Querían carnita?, ya llegó el abelón"	"Did you want carnita?, the abelón has arrived"	10–11	25	2022–23
Elizabeth Varela	"Sola, solicitada y soltera"	"Alone, solicited and unmarried"	10–11	24	2022–23
Ricardo "Ricky" Ochoa	"Me gustan todos, todas y todes"	"I like everyone, everyone"	10–11	25	2022–23
Roberto "Robbie" Mora	"Amado por todas, odiado por muchos"	"Loved by all, hated by many"	10–11	21	2022–23
Sebastián Galvez	"A la mujer como al mezcal, despacito y a besitos"	"A woman like mezcal, slowly and kisses"	10–11	22	2022–23
Andrés Cervantes	"Que que que pasho, ¿todo bien?"	"What what what happened, everything okay?"	10	11	2022
Andrea Otaola	"No, no, no, no, esto se acaba hasta que yo diga"	"No, no, no, no, this is over until I say"	11	13	2023
Jesús "Chuy" Esparza	"Acapulco, Jesús te ama"	"Acapulco, Jesus loves you"	11	13	2023
Regina "Rexx" Coquet	"Coqueta, cabrona, y sin filtros"	"Flirty, bastard, and no filterss"	11	13	2023
Abigail Salazar	"Yo soy como Santedupeje, buena por donde te fijes"	"I'm like santedupeje, good everywhere you look"	11	10	2023
Supporting cast
Cintia Cossio	—N/a	—N/a	5	3	2018
Elettra Lamborghini	—N/a	—N/a	5	3	2018
Anahí Izali	—N/a	—N/a	6	8	2019
Ramiro Giménez	—N/a	—N/a	7, 8	15	2020–21
José "Pepe" Arana	—N/a	—N/a	7	10	2020
Aarón "Capitán" Albores	—N/a	—N/a	8	6	2021
Diana Chiquete	—N/a	—N/a	8	6	2021
Andrés Altafulla	—N/a	—N/a	9	11	2022
Kelly Reales	—N/a	—N/a	9	4	2022
María Fletcher	—N/a	—N/a	9	4	2022
Kelly "Red" Medanie	—N/a	—N/a	9	3	2022
Alejandra Varela	—N/a	—N/a	10	7	2022
Claudia Ariz	—N/a	—N/a	11	3	2023
Javier Barrera	—N/a	—N/a	11	3	2023
Sofía Lozano	—N/a	—N/a	11	3	2023

== Duration of cast ==
Cast member	Series 1											Series 2												Series 3												NG				Series 4												Series 5												Series 6															Series 7																	Series 8															Series 9														Series 10												Series 11												
Cast member	1	2	3	4	5	6	7	8	9	10	11	1	2	3	4	5	6	7	8	9	10	11	12	1	2	3	4	5	6	7	8	9	10	11	12	1	2	3	4	1	2	3	4	5	6	7	8	9	10	11	12	1	2	3	4	5	6	7	8	9	10	11	12	1	2	3	4	5	6	7	8	9	10	11	12	13	14	15	1	2	3	4	5	6	7	8	9	10	11	12	13	14	15	16	17	1	2	3	4	5	6	7	8	9	10	11	12	13	14	15	1	2	3	4	5	6	7	8	9	10	11	12	13	14	1	2	3	4	5	6	7	8	9	10	11	12	1	2	3	4	5	6	7	8	9	10	11	12	13
Eduardo M																																																																																																																																																					
Leslie																																																																																																																																																					
Alba																																																																																																																																																					
Abel																																																																																																																																																					
Elizabeth																																																																																																																																																					
Ricardo																																																																																																																																																					
Sebastián																																																																																																																																																					
Roberto																																																																																																																																																					
Andrea																																																																																																																																																					
Jesus																																																																																																																																																					
Regina																																																																																																																																																					
Jibranne																																																																																																																																																					
Claudia																																																																																																																																																					
Isabel																																																																																																																																																					
Sofía L																																																																																																																																																					
Abigail																																																																																																																																																					
Javier																																																																																																																																																					
Alejandra																																																																																																																																																					
Jacky																																																																																																																																																					
Fernanda																																																																																																																																																					
Luis M																																																																																																																																																					
Karime																																																																																																																																																					
Andrés C																																																																																																																																																					
Jaylin																																																																																																																																																					
Rocío																																																																																																																																																					
Andrés A																																																																																																																																																					
Santiago																																																																																																																																																					
Carlos																																																																																																																																																					
José R																																																																																																																																																					
Nati																																																																																																																																																					
Beni																																																																																																																																																					
María F																																																																																																																																																					
Kelly R																																																																																																																																																					
Kelly M																																																																																																																																																					
Diego																																																																																																																																																					
Charlotte																																																																																																																																																					
Diana																																																																																																																																																					
Matheus																																																																																																																																																					
Eduardo S																																																																																																																																																					
Ramiro																																																																																																																																																					
Ignacia																																																																																																																																																					
Aarón																																																																																																																																																					
José A																																																																																																																																																					
Xavier																																																																																																																																																					
Luis C																																																																																																																																																					
Tadeo																																																																																																																																																					
Manelyk																																																																																																																																																					
Talía																																																																																																																																																					
Dania																																																																																																																																																					
Brenda																																																																																																																																																					
Fernando																																																																																																																																																					
Anahí																																																																																																																																																					
Erick																																																																																																																																																					
María U																																																																																																																																																					
Víctor																																																																																																																																																					
Elettra																																																																																																																																																					
Cintia																																																																																																																																																					
Alexya																																																																																																																																																					
Christian																																																																																																																																																					
Gabriela																																																																																																																																																					
Danik																																																																																																																																																					
Tania																																																																																																																																																					
Nicole																																																																																																																																																					
Antonio																																																																																																																																																					
Humbie																																																																																																																																																					
Luisa																																																																																																																																																					
Marlen																																																																																																																																																					
Sofia B																																																																																																																																																					
Joyce																																																																																																																																																					

=== Notes ===
Key: = Cast member is featured in this episode.
Key: = Cast member arrives in the house.
Key: = Cast member voluntarily leaves the house.
Key: = Cast member leaves and returns to the house in the same episode.
Key: = Cast member joins the series, but leaves the same episode.
Key: = Cast member returns to the house.
Key: = Cast member features in this episode, but outside of the house.
Key: = Cast member does not feature in this episode.
Key: = Cast member leaves the series.
Key: = Cast member returns to the series.
Key: = Cast member is removed from the series.
Key: = Cast member features in this episode despite not being an official cast member at the time.
Key: = Cast member returns to the series, but leaves same episode.

== Cast changes ==
The official cast members were revealed on 4 October 2014. They are Luis Caballero, Tadeo Fernández, Manelyk González, Joyce Islas, Talía Loaiza, Fernando Lozada, Luis Méndez, and Karime Pindter.

In April 2015, Joyce Islas announced that she had left Acapulco Shore and would not be returning for the second series. Brenda Zambrano had joined the cast for series two. On 28 July 2015 it was announced that Talía Loaiza had been sacked from the show. In March 2016, Zambrano announced that he would not be returning for the third season. It was confirmed that new cast members Danik Michell, Nicole Olin and Tania Gattas joined the cast. Olin leave show on 26 July 2016. After the third season, original cast members Fernando Lozada and Tadeo Fernández, in addition to Gattas, did not return for the show's fourth season.

In March 2017, the one-season special "Acapulco Shore: New Generation" was revealed, featuring ten potential new cast members. It was about Eduardo Miranda, who had previously appeared in the fourth season of Big Brother Mexico, Alexya Larios, Antonio Tiburcio, Christian Herrera, Gabriela Ruiz, Humbie Vallin, Luisa Cavazos, Marlen Martínez, Sofía Beltrán and Víctor Ortiz. Before the selection, Sofia Beltrán was fired. Alexya Larios, Antonio Tiburcio, Christian Herrera, Gabriela Ruiz, and Victor Ortiz were selected to become permanent for season four. It was later confirmed that Tadeo Fernández, who left during the previous series, returned for the fourth season. Alexya Larios, Antonio Tiburcio, Christian Herrera, Danik Michell, Gabriela Ruiz, Luis Méndez and Víctor Ortiz left the show and did not return in the fifth season. Brenda Zambrano, Nicole Olin and Tania Gattas appeared recurrently throughout this season.

On April 17, 2018, three former cast members Brenda Zambrano, Eduardo Miranda, and Fernanzo Lozada returned for the fifth season, which also includes new main cast members Erick Sandoval, Leslie Gallardo and María Usi, plus supporting cast Elettra Lamborghini from Super Shore. Cossio and Lamborghini left the show during the seventh and tenth episodes of the fifth season. Gallardo, Sandoval and Usi left the show after the fifth season. In addition, Luis Méndez, Talía Loaiza and Víctor Ortiz made brief returns.

Series sixth featured the return of original cast members Luis Méndez and Talía Loaiza, and featured new cast members Anahí Izali, Dania Méndez, Jibranne Bazán, Rocío Sánchez, and Xavier Meade. Izali was expelled in episode fourteen. Brenda Zambrano and Fernando Lozada did not appear in the following series. Season seventh featured new cast members Fernanda Moreno and Ignacia Michelson, as well as supporting cast Isabel Castro, José Arana and Ramiro Giménez.. Talía Loaiza made a unique return to the program after her last appearance during the previous season.. On August 11, 2020, Dania Méndez left the program. The original cast members Luis Caballero, Luis Méndez, Manelyk González, Tadeo Fernández and Talía Loaiza, as well as Rocío Sánchez and Xavier Meade, did not return to the program for the eighth season.

Series eight introduced twelve new members of the cast that initially included Alba Zepeda, Diego Garsiasela, Jacky Ramirez and Jaylin Castellanos, and later Charlotte Caniggia, Eduardo Schobert and Matheus Crivella joined, this figure also includes the supporting cast, Aarón Albores and Diana Chiquete, while Ramiro Giménez repeats as a supporting cast. During the seventh episode of this season, Aarón Albores was removed from the show after threatening to kill another cast member, later Beni Falcón left the series in episode ten. Ignacia Michelson announced her departure from the program to focus on her mental health. Matheus Crivella also did not return to the show after joining Rio Shore. Despite announcing her participation for one more season, Charlotte Caniggia did not return to the show, in addition to Diana Chiquete, Eduardo Schobert and Ramiro Giménez.

In December 2021, the return of Beni Falcón was announced for the ninth season of the program, in addition to the debut of Carlos Pantoja, José Rodríguez, Nati Peláez and Santiago Santana. Later, in January 2022, MTV announced the participation of Diego Garciasela and Jibranne Bazán, plus the return of Rocío Sánchez after having appeared for the last time in the seventh season and the incorporation of Andrés Altafulla. Diego decided to leave the show in the sixth episode to take a break and recover physically and mentally. Kelly Medanie, Kelly Reales, and Maria Fletcher joined the show in the seventh and ninth episodes, respectively. In June 2022, it was announced via social media that none of the rookies from the ninth season would be returning to the show for the tenth season. In August 2022, the return of the original member Luis Méndez was secured, as well as five new members, including Abel Robles, Andrés Cervantes, Elizabeth Varela, Ricardo Ochoa and Sebastián Gálvez. Jaylin Castellanos and Rocío Sánchez made a brief return to the show, while Roberto Mora and Alejandra Varela joined the show for the first time in the fifth and sixth chapters, respectively.

By the eleventh season, half the cast had declined, including Karime Pindter and Luis Mendez, this being the first season not to include an original cast member. Roberto Mora was promoted to full time member. Leslie Gallardo from season five returned to the show, while Abigail Salazar, Andrea Otaola, Jesús Esparza, and Regina Coquet joined the show. Javier Barrera, Claudia Ariz and Sofía Lozano and former cast member Jibranne Bazán joined the supporting cast. It also has the return of Isabel Castro who decided to leave voluntarily before the end of the season.

== Other appearances ==
As well as appearing in Acapulco Shore, some of the cast members have competed in other reality TV shows.

Member cast	Other(s) reality
Aarón Albores	Survivor Mexico (2023)
Abel Robles	Tentados por la fortuna (2024), La Venganza de los Ex VIP (2026)
Alba Zepeda	MTV RE$I$TIRÉ (2022), La Venganza de los Ex (2023), La Isla: Desafio Grecia y Turquía (2024)
Anahí Izali	Guerreros (2020), La casa de los famosos (2021), Los 50 (2023), La Isla: Desafió Turquía (2023)
Andrés Altafulla	Protagonistas de nuestra tele (2017), La casa de los famosos Colombia (2025)
Beni Falcón	La Venganza de los Ex VIP 3 (2023), Survivor Mexico (2024)
Brenda Zambrano	Mitad y Mitad (2014), Super Shore (2017), La Venganza de los Ex (2018), Guerreros (2020), Inseparables: amor al límite (2021), La casa de los famosos (2022), MTV RE$I$TIRÉ (2022), La Isla: Desafió Turquía (2023), Abandonados (2024)
Charlotte Caniggia	Bailando (2012, 2016, 2019, 2021, 2023), L'Isola dei Famosi (2015), Gran Hermano VIP 4 (2016), RE$I$TIRÉ (2019), Cantando 2020, MasterChef Celebrity Argentina (2021-2022), ¿Quién es la máscara? (2022), El hotel de los famosos (2023), Gran Hermano (2026)
Claudia Ariz	La Venganza de los Ex VIP (2025)
Dania Méndez	La casa de los famosos (2023), Los 50 (2023), Las estrellas bailan en Hoy (2023), La casa de los famosos (2025)
Danik Michell	Super Shore (2017)
Diego Garciasela	El Mundo Real (2019), La Isla: Desafio Grecia y Turquía (2024)
Eduardo Miranda	Big Brother México (2015), MTV RE$I$TIRÉ (2022), Survivor Mexico (2024)
Eduardo Schobert	La Venganza de los Ex VIP (2026)
Elettra Lamborghini	Super Shore (2016-2017), Geordie Shore (2017), Gran Hermano VIP (2017)
Elizabeth Varela	Are You the One? El Match Perfecto (2017), MTV RE$I$TIRÉ (2022), Survivor Mexico (2024)
Fernanda Moreno	La Venganza de los Ex VIP (2023), La Isla: Desafio Grecia y Turquía (2024)
Fernando Lozada	Super Shore (2016), Exatlón USA (2020), Exatlón USA: Torneo de Temporadas (2020), MTV RE$I$TIRÉ (2022), Los 50 (2023), La casa de los famosos (2024), La Isla: Desafio Grecia y Turquía (2024), Exatlón USA: Arena de Campeones (2025), La Granja VIP (2026)
Gabriela Ruiz	La Venganza de los Ex (2018)
Ignacia Michelson	Resistiré (2019), Gran Hermano Chile (2023), Mundos Opuestos (2025), La Venganza de los Ex VIP (2026)
Isabel Castro	Inseparables: amor al límite (2022), Los 50 (2023), All Star Shore (2023)
Jacky Ramirez	Survivor Mexico (2022), La Venganza de los Ex VIP (2025)
Jibranne Bazán	La Venganza de los Ex VIP (2023), Tentados por la fortuna (2025)
José Rodríguez	La casa de los famosos (2023), La casa de los famosos Colombia (2025)
Karime Pindter	Super Shore (2016-2017), All Star Shore (2022), La casa de los famosos México (2024), LOL: Last One Laughing (2024)
Leslie Gallardo	La Venganza de los Ex VIP (2023), La Ley de la Selva (2023), La casa de los famosos (2024), Los 50 (2024), Hoy soy el Chef (2025), MasterChef Celebrity Mexico (2025), Rio Shore (2026)
Luis Caballero	La Academia (2010), Super Shore (2016-2017), Guerreros (2020-2021), Inseparables: amor al límite (2021), La casa de los famosos (2022), Las estrellas bailan en Hoy (2021, 2022), All Star Shore (2022), Los 50 (2023), La casa de los famosos México (2024)
Luis Méndez	Super Shore (2016), Hotel VIP (2023), Exatlón México: La Nueva Era (2023), La Granja VIP (2025)
Manelyk Gonzalez	Super Shore (2016-2017), Resistiré (2019), La casa de los famosos (2021), Las estrellas bailan en Hoy (2022), Los 50 (2023), La casa de los famosos (2025)
María Fletcher	Mitad y Mitad (2014)
Matheus Crivella	De Férias com o Ex (2019), De Férias com o Ex (2020), Rio Shore (2021-23), De Férias com o Ex Caribe (2023), De Férias com o Ex Diretoria (2026)
Roberto Mora	La Venganza de los Ex VIP (2022), MTV RE$I$TIRÉ (2022), La casa de los famosos (2024), Los 50 (2024), La Venganza de los Ex VIP (2026)
Rocío Sáchez	La Venganza de los Ex (2018), La Isla: Desafio Grecia y Turquía (2024)
Santiago Santana	La Venganza de los Ex VIP (2025)
Tadeo Fernández	Super Shore (2017), Abandonados (2024), Survivor Mexico: Heroes vs. Villains (2025)
Talía Loaiza	Super Shore (2016), Are You the One? El Match Perfecto (2018), Abandonados (2024)
Víctor Ortiz	Super Shore (2017), Reto 4 elementos (2018), Tentados por la fortuna (2025)
Xavier Ulibarri	All Star Shore (2023)
