= Acapulco Shore series 10 =

Acapulco Shore
- Season 10
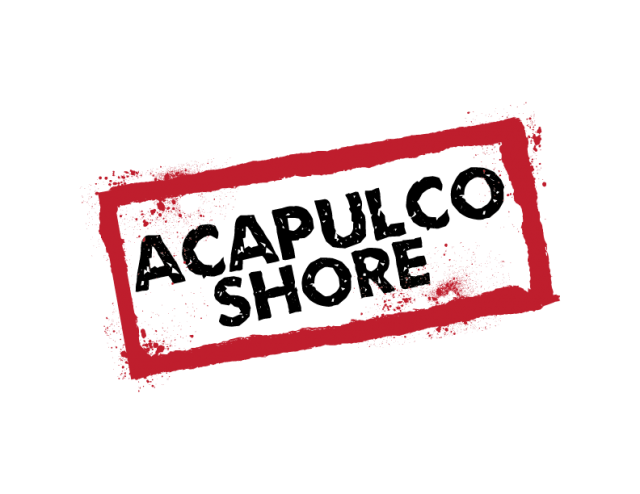
- No. of episodes: 12

Release
- Original network: MTV
- Original release: 27 September – 13 December 2022

Series chronology
- ← Previous; Series 9 Next → Series 11

The tenth season of Acapulco Shore, a Mexican television programme based in Acapulco was announced in August 2022 and premiered on September 27, 2022. Filming started in June 2022 in the coastal city of Puerto Vallarta, Jalisco, making this the second time the show is filmed in this city. Days after filming began rolling, a possible case of COVID-19 among cast members caused filming to be put on hold for a few days, before resuming. This season was announced in February 2022, via a Viacom press release. On August 28, 2022, the cast members were announced. This season marks the return of original cast member, Luis “Jawy” Méndez since his last appearance in Season 7. New cast members this season include Andrés Cervantes, Abel Robles, Elizabeth Varela, who previously participated in AYTO? and Resistiré, Ricardo “Ricky” Ochoa and Sebastián Gálvez, Alejandra Varela and Roberto Mora debuted later. The trailer of the season was released on September 12, 2022. Jaylin Castellanos and Rocío Sánchez were featured guests this season, while original castmember Fernando Lozada guest appeared in the final 2 episodes.

Ahead of the season premiere, during a press interview, original cast member Karime Pindter announced her engagement, plans for her upcoming wedding, and also revealed this was her final season on the show.

== Cast ==
- Abel Robles
- Alba Zepeda
- Andrés Cervantes (Episodes 1–11)
- Eduardo "Chile" Miranda
- Elizabeth “Eli” Varela
- Fernanda Moreno
- Isabel "Isa" Castro
- Jacky Ramírez
- Karime Pindter
- Luis "Jawy" Méndez
- Ricardo "Ricky" Ochoa
- Sebastián Galvez

=== Special Guest ===
- Alejandra Varela (Episodes 6–12)
- Jaylin Castellanos (Episodes 8–9)
- Roberto "Robbie" Mora (Episodes 5–12)
- Rocío Sánchez (Episodes 3–7)

=== Duration of cast ===
Cast members	Season 10											
Cast members	1	2	3	4	5	6	7	8	9	10	11	12
Abel												
Alba												
Alejandra												
Andrés												
Eduardo												
Elizabeth												
Fernanda												
Isabel												
Jacky												
Jaylin												
Karime												
Luis												
Ricardo												
Roberto												
Rocío												
Sebastián												

= Cast member is featured in this episode.
= Cast member arrives in the house.
= Cast member voluntarily leaves the house.
= Cast member leaves and returns to the house in the same episode.
= Cast member returns to the house.
= Cast member leaves the series.
= Cast member returns to the series.
= Cast member does not feature in this episode.
= "Cast member" is not a cast member in this episode.

== Episodes ==
Note: Some episode titles have been adapted to a more understandable English translation

No. overall	No. in season	Title	Duration	Original release date
125	1	"A New Family Was Born"	60 minutes	27 September 2022
126	2	"Just Maximum Partying"	60 minutes	4 October 2022
127	3	"Royal Rumble"	60 minutes	11 October 2022
128	4	"Evictions And Arrivals"	60 minutes	18 October 2022
129	5	"Your Ex Is Here"	60 minutes	25 October 2022
130	6	"Family Reunion"	60 minutes	1 November 2022
131	7	"A Very Shore Birthday"	60 minutes	8 November 2022
132	8	"Happy Pride!"	60 minutes	15 November 2022
133	9	"Surprise, We're Back Together"	60 minutes	22 November 2022
134	10	"Girl's Night Out"	60 minutes	29 November 2022
135	11	"An Anticipated Farewell"	60 minutes	6 December 2022
136	12	"The Final Party"	60 minutes	13 December 2022
