= Super Shore =

- Genre: Reality
- Created by: MTV
- Country of origin: Spain
- Original language: Spanish
- No. of seasons: 3
- No. of episodes: 43

Production
- Running time: 50/55 minutes
- Production companies: Magnolia (seasons 1–2); Bulldog TV (seasons 1–2); La Competencia (season 3)

Original release
- Network: MTV
- Release: February 2, 2016 – December 19, 2017

Related
- Acapulco Shore; Geordie Shore; Gandía Shore; All Star Shore

Super Shore is a reality television series broadcast on MTV Spain and MTV Latin America, which follows the daily lives of nine young people who intend to spend the summer living together in different parts of southern Europe, starting on the Greek island of Mykonos and later in the Spanish city of Madrid. It is an adaptation of the American program Jersey Shore featuring participants from Gandía Shore and Acapulco Shore, the Spanish and Mexican versions of that series, along with Brazilian Igor Freitas of reality Are You the One? Brasil and the Italian Elettra Lamborghini, granddaughter of Ferruccio Lamborghini.

== History ==
Two years after the end of Gandía Shore and several weeks after announcing the return of Alaska and Mario to MTV, the channel and producer Magnolia TV confirmed the return of the format to Spain with a second season, arising from an alliance between MTV South Europe and MTV Latin America. In this case, the recordings would be transferred to the island of Ibiza, changing the name of the program to Ibiza Shore.

In the new program there would be a group that would combine several participants from Gandía Shore and Acapulco Shore, Spanish and Mexican versions of the Jersey Shore format of US origin.

In this way, a new program would return for the start of the 2015/2016 television season.

Following the opposition by public institutions, such as the federation of SMEs and businessmen in Ibiza MTV announced its resignation to record the announced program Ibiza Shore in the locality of the Balearic Islands. The chain argued in a statement that "Due to a series Of circumstances that we can not control, the next program of the Shore franchise will not be recorded in Ibiza".

After the events, finally MTV and the producer Magnolia TV decided that the program would be filmed at various points of the Mediterranean coast and that it would be titled Super Shore.

== Seasons ==
Year	Season	Predominant location	Number of episodes
2016	Season 1	Mykonos, Greece & Madrid, Spain	15
2016	Season 2	Marbella, Spain	15
2017	Season 3	Rimini, Italy	13

=== Season 1 (2016) ===
The recording of Super Shore began at the end of August 2015 and details were known as the house in which the components in Madrid would be hosted and all the information about the participants. It was also known that the date for its premiere would be scheduled for February 2, 2016.

In this edition of the franchise, the shores would work in a recognized gym of Madrid and later like servers rollers of a service of fast food to be able to pay certain expenses of the house.

The show premiered simultaneously on February 2, 2016 on the MTV Latin America, MTV Spain and MTV France networks as originally planned.

In Latin America, through the MTV Latin America streaming platform called MTV Play, all episodes of Super Shore were broadcast two days before their television premiere (from the second episode) for free and at no extra cost.

=== Season 2 (2016) ===
June 16, 2016 announced the renewal of the program for a second season, due to the good results obtained with the first season. This was announced through the social networks of the networks MTV Spain and MTV Latin America. It premiered in Latin America on October 18, 2016 and in Spain on the October 23, 2016, while the recording venue was Marbella, Spain. In this season, cast member Karime Pindter was replaced by Talía Eisset.

=== Season 3: a la Italiana (2017) ===
In March 2017, a third season of the program was confirmed, its premiere is scheduled for October of the same year. On July 3, 2017, it was announced that the new season would be filmed in Rimini, Italy and subtitled a la Italiana. Elettra Lamborghini was the first to be confirmed as a cast member this season. The next cast members to be confirmed were Karime Pindter, Luis "Potro" Caballero and Igor Freitas. Danik Michell and Víctor Ortiz were later added to the cast for this season. MTV Spain held an open casting call, where new cast members Adela, Isaac, and Ferre were chosen online as the replacements for Abraham, Arantxa, and Esteban.

Also, previous cast members Manelyk "Mane" González, José Labrador and Talía Loaiza were later confirmed to not take part on this season. On July 5, 2017, Arantxa Bustos confirmed via her personal Instagram page that she was not returning to the show. On July 19, 2017, it was confirmed through social media that former cast members Abraham García, Brenda Zambrano and Tadeo Fernández were guests on this season. On July 29, 2017, it was leaked online that Arantxa was another of the guests to be featured in the upcoming season.

By September 18, 2017, MTV Spain announced the final cast member for the series, Eva from France. She was cast through a special event miniseries set by MTV France, Super Shore Ouvre-toi!: Les Français Arrivent, in order to choose their representative for this new season of Super Shore.

== Cast ==
=== Cast members ===
Cast member	Seasons	Episodes	Starting age	Origin	Franchise
Elettra Lamborghini	1–3	43	21	Bologna, Italy	—N/a
Igor Freitas	1–3	43	24	Minas Gerais, Brazil	Are You the One Brasil
Luis "Potro" Caballero	1–3	41	23	Mexico City, Mexico	Acapulco Shore
Karime Pindter	1–3	34	23	Mexico City, Mexico	Acapulco Shore
Arantxa Bustos	1–2	33	25	Madrid, Spain	Gandia Shore
Abraham García	1–2	32	25	Madrid, Spain	Gandia Shore
Manelyk González	1–2	30	26	Mexico City, Mexico	Acapulco Shore
Esteban Martínez	1–2	30	28	L'Eliana, Spain	Gandia Shore
Fernando Lozada	1–2	25	26	Mexico City, Mexico	Acapulco Shore
Talía Loaiza	2	15	28	Tepito, Mexico	Acapulco Shore
José Labrador	2	6	30	Sagunt, Spain	Gandia Shore
Adela Hernández	3	13	22	Madrid, Spain	—N/a
Danik Michell	3	13	21	Monterrey, Mexico	Acapulco Shore
Jaime "Ferre" Ferrera	3	13	23	Huelva, Spain	—N/a
Isaac Torres	3	13	21	Barcelona, Spain	—N/a
Víctor Ortiz	3	13	26	Chiapas, Mexico	Acapulco Shore
Eva Kiwirose	3	6	24	Toulouse, France	Super Shore Ouvre-toi!: Les Français Arrivent
Paula González	3	4	21	Madrid, Spain	—N/a

=== Special guests ===
Cast member	Seasons	Episodes	Starting age	Origin	Franchise
Jawy Méndez	1	3	26	Mexico City, Mexico	Acapulco Shore
Chloe Ferry	2	1	21	Newcastle upon Tyne, England	Geordie Shore
Kyle Christie	2	1	24	South Shields, England	Geordie Shore
Brenda Zambrano	3	3	24	Ciudad Victoria, Mexico	Acapulco Shore
Tadeo Fernández	3	3	29	Guadalajara, Mexico	Acapulco Shore

=== Duration of cast ===
Name	1	2	3	4	5	6	7	8	9	10	11	12	13	1	2	3	4	5	6	7	8	9	10	12	13	14	1	2	3	4	5	6	7	8	9	10	11	12	13
Elettra																																							
Igor																																							
Potro																																							
Karime																																							
Arantxa																																							
Abraham																																							
Esteban																																							
Mane																																							
Fernando																																							
Talía																																							
Labrador																																							
Adela																																							
Danik																																							
Ferre																																							
Isaac																																							
Víctor																																							
Eva																																							
Paula																																							
Special guests	Season 1													Season 2													Season 3												
Special guests	1	2	3	4	5	6	7	8	9	10	11	12	13	1	2	3	4	5	6	7	8	9	10	12	13	14	1	2	3	4	5	6	7	8	9	10	11	12	13
Jawy																																							
Chloe																																							
Kyle																																							
Brenda																																							
Tadeo																																							

=== Notes ===
Key: = Cast member is featured in this episode.
Key: = Cast member arrives in the house.
Key: = Cast member voluntarily leaves the house.
Key: = Cast member joins the series, but leaves the same episode.
Key: = Cast member leaves and returns to the house in the same episode.
Key: = Cast member returns to the house.
Key: = Cast member features in this episode, but outside of the house.
Key: = Cast member does not feature in this episode.
Key: = Cast member leaves the series.
Key: = Cast member returns to the series.
Key: = Cast member is removed from the series.
Key: = Cast member features in this episode despite not being an official cast member at the time.
Key: = Cast member returns to the series, but leaves same episode.

== Other appearances ==
As well as appearing on Super Shore, some of the cast members have also competed on other reality television shows.

- Campamento de Verano
  - Esteban Martínez – Season 1 (2013) – 10th evicted
- Supervivientes
  - Abraham García – Season 9 (2014) – Winner
  - Arantxa Bustos – Season 10 (2015) – 1st evicted
  - José Labrador – Season 10 (2015) – 2nd evicted
  - Jaime Ferrera – Season 19 (2020) – 5th evicted
- Doble tentación
  - Abraham García – Season 1 (2017) – Runner-up
- Gran Hermano VIP
  - Elettra Lamborghini – Season 5 (2017) – Fourth place
- Are You the One? El Match Perfecto
  - Talía Loaiza – Season 2 (2018)
- La casa de los famosos
  - Manelyk González – Season 1 & Season 5 (2021 & 2025) – Runner-up/14th evicted
  - Luis Caballero – Season 2 (2022) – 3rd evicted
- La casa fuerte
  - Jaime Ferreira – Season 1 (2020) – Third place
- La Isla de las Tentaciones
  - Isaac Torres – Season 3 (2021) – Finalist
- La ultima tentación
  - Isaac Torres – Season 1 (2021) – Finalist
- A Fazenda
  - Igor Freitas – Season 15 (2023) – Not Selected
