= Stranded with a Million Dollars =

2017 American reality television series

- Genre: Reality competition
- Country of origin: United States
- Original language: English
- No. of seasons: 1
- No. of episodes: 10

Production
- Executive producers: John Davis; Kevin Lee
- Production company: Tollbooth TV

Original release
- Network: MTV
- Release: February 21 – April 25, 2017

Stranded with a Million Dollars is a survival reality series that premiered on MTV on February 21, 2017, and concluded its run on April 25 of the same year.

== Format ==
Cast members have to survive for 40 days on a deserted island for their share of $1 million. They can purchase the survival supplies and amenities they want, but everything is very expensive and the total is deducted from the final cash prize.

== Cast ==
Cast member	Age	Hometown	Finish
Alex Apple	24	South Burlington, Vermont	$124,418
Alonzo Gordon	23	Buffalo, New York	$0
Ashley Mercer	24	Media, Pennsylvania	$0
Bria Fleming	20	Los Angeles	$0
Chris Lacerra	19	Watertown, Massachusetts	$0
Cody Dunlap	22	San Antonio	$124,418
Eilish Rodriguez	22	Bloomfield, New Mexico	$0
Gina Lam	25	San Diego	$124,418
Michael Schuur	18	Palo Alto, California	$0
Natalie "Makani" Paul	21	Venice, Los Angeles	$124,418

^1 Age at the time of filming.

== Episodes ==
No.	Title	Original release date	U.S. viewers (millions)
1	"Game of Drones"	February 21, 2017	0.42
2	"Group Bye"	February 28, 2017	0.38
3	"Stirring the Pot"	March 7, 2017	0.39
4	"In-Tents"	March 14, 2017	0.41
5	"Pizza, Burgers, and Cards Oh My!"	March 21, 2017	0.37
6	"Til Sickness Do Us Part"	March 28, 2017	0.38
7	"Lines in the Sand"	April 4, 2017	0.39
8	"No Money Mo Problems"	April 11, 2017	0.42
9	"Thrive Nugget"	April 18, 2017	0.41
10	"Forty Days and Forty Fights"	April 25, 2017	0.44

== International adaptation ==
A Latin American version titled Resistiré was produced in association with Chile's Mega Media in 2019.
