= MTV RE$I$TIRÉ =

- Genre: Reality competition
- Based on: Resistiré
- Presented by: Estefanía Ahumada; Omár Pérez Reyes "Faisy"
- Original language: Spanish
- No. of seasons: 1
- No. of episodes: 20

Production
- Production locations: Santa Marta, Colombia
- Running time: 60 minutes

Original release
- Network: MTV Latin America
- Release: March 21 – April 20, 2022

MTV Resistiré is a reality competition broadcast by MTV Latin America. It is an adaptation of the Chilean television series Resistiré.

It follows the same premise, the contest consists of bringing together a group of people, who will have to survive extreme situations, full of unbearable challenges, in addition to going hungry and overcoming the possible temptations that this implies, to win the final prize. In addition, the participants will compete every week so as not to be eliminated.

== Format ==
In Resistiré, the 16 participants will be abandoned in a shelter in the middle of nowhere with no beds, indoor toilets, prepared food or a supply of drinking water, but with half a million dollars corresponding to the final prize. With that money they will be able to buy the items they need to survive, but at an unusual value, and in a decision that requires a majority agreement to materialize. Survival, democracy and social struggle: all in one.

== Production ==
The production of the program began in February 2022, happening to be produced only by MTV and not by MEGA like last season. On February 22, MTV announced the premiere date and the participants. It premiered on March 21, 2022, and broadcast its last episode on April 20 of the same year.

== Contestants ==
Name	Notability	Team			Episode entered	Episode exited	Status
Fernando Lozada	Acapulco Shore	Orange		Individual	1	20	Winner
Guty Carrera	Guerreros	Blue	Orange	Individual	1	20	Runners-up
Samira Jalil	MyHyV	Orange		Individual	1	20	Runners-up
Eduardo "Chile" Miranda	Acapulco Shore	Blue		Individual	1	19	4th place
Osiris Orozco	MasterChef México		Blue	Individual	9	19	5th place
Yann Martín	Reto 4 Elementos	Blue		Individual	1	19	6th place
Alba Zepeda	Acapulco Shore	Orange		Individual	1	19	7th place
Elizabeth Varela	AYOMP	Blue		Individual	1	18	Evacuation
Kimberly Shantal	La Venganza de los Ex	Blue			1	17	4th eliminated
Brenda Zambrano	Acapulco Shore	Orange			1	13	Expelled
Miss Mickey	YouTuber	Orange			1	13	3rds eliminateds
Emilio Betancourt	Speaker	Blue			1	13	3rds eliminateds
Susana Rentería	Actress	Blue			1	9	Abandoned
Robbie Mora	La Venganza de los Ex	Orange			1	9	2nds eliminateds
Osiris Orozco	Returned to game	Orange			1	9	2nds eliminateds
Julio Camejo	Actor	Orange			1	5	1sts eliminateds
Diosa Quenzal	Professional wrestler	Blue			1	5	1sts eliminateds

== Nominations table ==
- Votes of the "Careo": Participants vote for a member of any team (except for the leaders and the first two nominees), whoever gets the most votes will become the third nominee.
  - In the Final, each participant votes individually and whoever obtains the most votes will be "blocked", that is, they will not be able to compete that week for a place in the final.
- Betrayed: Before "The Fight For Supremacy" each captain must choose one of his companions to betray them. The losing team will see their betrayed become the first betrayed.

	Nominations				
	Episode 4	Episode 8	Episode 12	Episode 16	Episode 18
Immune(s)	Brenda; Guty				
Fernando	Yann	Elizabeth	Emilio	Elizabeth	Yann
Guty	Julio	Fernando	Condemned	Elizabeth	Osiris
Condemned
Condemned Betrayed	Osiris; Brenda's decision				
Condemned Loser	Robbie; Guty's decision				
Condemned by Careo	Julio; 7/14 votes				
Condemned by the condemned	Diosa; Osiris, Robbie and Julio's decision				
Eliminated(s)	Diosa; Julio; Losers of the duel				

=== Summary statistics ===
	Episode											
	5	9	13	17	18			19				20
Fernando	Saved	Condemned	Leader	Saved	Winner	Loser	Winner	Finalist				Winner
Guty	Leader	Saved	Condemned	Leader	Winner	Loser	Loser	Semi-finalist			Finalist	Runner-up
Samira	Saved	Leader	Saved	Saved	Winner	Winner	Finalist					Runner-up
Osiris	Condemned	Eliminated	Saved	Saved	Loser	Inactive	Loser	Semi-finalist			Eliminated	
Chile	Saved	Saved	Leader	Condemned	Loser	Inactive	Loser	Semi-finalist		Eliminated		
Yann	Saved	Saved	Saved	Leader	Loser	Inactive	Blocked	Semi-finalist	Eliminated			
Alba	Saved	Saved	Saved	Condemned	Winner	Loser	Loser	Eliminated				
Elizabeth	Saved	Condemned	Saved	Condemned	Loser	Inactive	Evacued					
Kimberly	Saved	Leader	Condemned	Eliminated								
Brenda	Leader	Saved	Saved	Expelled								
Miss Mickey	Saved	Saved	Eliminated									
Emilio	Saved	Saved	Eliminated									
Susana	Saved	Saved	Abandoned									
Robbie	Condemned	Eliminated										
Julio	Eliminated											
Diosa	Eliminated											
