= Brenda Zambrano =

Mexican model and TV personality

- Born: Brenda Alicia Zambrano; África, Tamaulipas, Mexico
- Occupations: social media influencer, showgirl and media personality
- Years active: 2014–present
- Partner: Guty Carrera (2019–2023)

Brenda Zambrano is a Mexican model, social media influencer, showgirl and media personality.

== Biography ==
Brenda has five siblings on her mother's side and two on her father's side since her parents separated.

== Career ==
She participated in a reality show Mitad y Mitad where she was looking for a partner but she had no significance. What she managed to transcend is her Instagram account where she was traveling, and she showed her statuesque and beautiful figure. That is why she was called to participate in a new reality show, Acapulco Shore.

Thus began her career in the world of reality shows, Brenda was part of the main cast of Acapulco Shore during the second season and then returned for the fifth and sixth seasons. The success of this show led her and her castmates to become internet personalities, influencers with many followers.

She also participates in other reality shows such as Super Shore, and La Venganza de los Ex where Zambrano went to take revenge on her ex-boyfriends, Ernesto Leal and Johnatan Gutierrez.

After leaving Acapulco Shore, she decided to become a YouTuber, calling her channel, "Brenda, con límites, ahora sí" where she talked about her life, she showed her looks, fashion blogs, among others stuff.

In 2020 she returned to the world of reality shows, this time to Guerreros, integrating the Cobras team. Brenda's participation lasted only one month and one week, as she became the fourth eliminated, in her second nomination, by public vote.

In 2022 she participated in the second season of Resistire, it is produced by MTV, integrating the orange team, although only for four weeks since Brenda would be expelled for violating the program's rules after skipping the exit door. In May she joined La casa de los famosos, in her second season where on the fourteenth day Brenda is eliminated with 53% of the votes against Natalia Alcocer and Ignacio Casano

In August 2023, she confirmed her participation in the return of the reality show La Isla titling that edition "Desafio Turquía".

== Personal life ==
In 2017, she was attacked while at a club in Cancun, the incident went viral after Zambrano posted a video of herself bloodied.

During her stay on La Venganza de los Ex, she resumed her relationship with Jonathan Gutiérrez (known as John Guts), in June 2018 Gutiérrez proposed to her during the pink carpet at the MTV MIAW Awards, However, in September the couple separated.

She began a relationship with Guty Carrera in 2019. They announced their separation in February 2023.

== Filmography ==
=== Television ===
Year	Title	Role	Notes
2014	Mitad y Mitad	Contestant	Abandoned
2015, 2017–19	Acapulco Shore	Herself	Main cast (season 2, 5-6); 38 episodes Recurring cast (season 4); 3 episodes
2017	Super Shore: A la Italiana	Herself	Special guest (season 3); 3 episodes
2018	La Venganza de los Ex	Herself	Main cast (season 1); 10 episodes
2020	Guerreros 2020	Contestant	4th eliminated (season 1)
2021	Inseparables: amor al límite	Contestant	5th eliminated (season 2); 20 episodes
2022	MTV RE$I$TIRÉ	Contestant	Banished, 13 episodes
2022	La casa de los famosos	Herself	2nd eliminated (season 2)
2023	La Isla: Desafió Turquía	Contestant	6th eliminated; 30 episodes
2024	Abandonados, Asia: La Ruta del Dragón	Contestant	1st eliminated; 5 episodes
