= Are You the One? El Match Perfecto =

- Genre: Reality competition; Dating show
- Presented by: Roberto Carlo; Vadhir Derbez
- Opening theme: "Smooth Hand" by Heavy Young Heathens
- Country of origin: Mexico
- Original language: Spanish
- No. of seasons: 2
- No. of episodes: 70

Production
- Running time: 60 minutes (including commercials)

Original release
- Network: MTV
- Release: September 20, 2016 – May 6, 2018

Related
- Are You the One?; Are You the One? Brasil

Are You the One? El Match Perfecto is a Mexican reality television series on MTV Latin America. It is a Mexican version of the original American series. It follows 20 people who are living together in a tropical destination to find their perfect match. If the 10 men and 10 women are able to correctly choose all ten perfect matches in ten weeks, they will win $200 thousand to split among them. Each episode the cast will pair up with whoever they believe their perfect match is to compete in a challenge. The winners of the challenge will go on a date, and have a chance to test their match in the truth booth. The cast members will choose one of the winning couples to go to the truth booth to determine if they are a perfect match or not. This is the only way to confirm matches. Each episode ends with a matching ceremony where the couples will be told how many perfect matches they have, but not which matches are correct. It debuted in September 2016 on MTV Latin America.

== Season 1 ==
Season one premiered on September 20, 2016. Filmed in Dominican Republic.

=== Cast ===
Guys
Cast member	Age	Hometown
Andrés de la Mora	21	Guadalajara, Mexico
Cristian Moreno	27	Medellín, Colombia
Diego Contreras	27	Guadalajara, Mexico
Esteban López	29	Medellín, Colombia
Jesús J. Soto	24	Sinaloa, Mexico
Johnny Prado	25	Mexico City, Mexico
Juan C. Ramírez	29	Mexico City, Mexico
Roberto Grecco	26	Bogotá, Colombia
Rogelio Rodríguez	26	Monterrey, Mexico
Saulo Miralles	27	Mar del Plata, Argentina

Girls
Cast member	Age	Hometown
Aida Rojo	19	Hermosillo, Mexico
Daniela Pillot	27	Mexico City, Mexico
Edna Ferrin	25	Medellín, Colombia
Jenniffer Quintero	23	Medellín, Colombia
Katherine Mora	25	San José, Costa Rica
Marcela Abreu	28	Mexico City, Mexico
M. Fernanda Morales	20	Mexico City, Mexico
M. José Sánchez	27	Mexico City, Mexico
Natalia Catalá	24	Mexico City, Mexico
Rosita Arias	27	Medellín, Colombia

=== Progress ===
Guys	Week									
Guys	1	2	3	4	5	6	7	8	9	10
Andrés	Katherine	Katherine	Aida	Katherine	Katherine	Katherine	Jennifer	Edna	Daniela	Natalia
Cristian	Marcela	Natalia	Edna	Natalia	Natalia	Natalia	Katherine	Katherine	Katherine	Katherine
Diego	Jenniffer	Jenniffer	Marcela	María F	Jenniffer	Jenniffer	Aida	María José	Natalia	Edna
Esteban	María José	María José	María José	María José	María F	María José	María F	Natalia	Edna	Daniela
Julián	Daniela	Daniela	Daniela	Daniela	Daniela	Daniela	Edna	Jenniffer	Jenniffer	Jenniffer
Johnny	Natalia	Marcela	Katherine	Marcela	Marcela	Edna	Natalia	Marcela	Marcela	Marcela
Juan Carlos	Rosita	Rosita	Rosita	Rosita	Rosita	Rosita	Rosita	Rosita	Rosita	Rosita
Roberto	Aida	Aida	Natalia	Aida	Aida	Aida	María José	Aida	Aida	Aida
Rogelio	María F	María F	María F	Jenniffer	María José	María F	Daniela	María F	María F	María F
Saulo	Edna	Edna	Jenniffer	Edna	Edna	Marcela	Marcela	Daniela	María J	María J
Correct matches	3	4	2	3	3	3	2	6	7	10

Girls	Week									
Girls	1	2	3	4	5	6	7	8	9	10
Aida	Roberto	Roberto	Andrés	Roberto	Roberto	Roberto	Diego	Roberto	Roberto	Roberto
Daniela	Julián	Julián	Julián	Julián	Julián	Julián	Rogelio	Saulo	Andrés	Esteban
Edna	Saulo	Saulo	Cristian	Saulo	Saulo	Johnny	Julián	Andrés	Esteban	Diego
Jenniffer	Diego	Diego	Saulo	Rogelio	Diego	Diego	Andrés	Julián	Julián	Julian
Katherine	Andrés	Andrés	Johnny	Andrés	Andrés	Andrés.	Cristian	Cristian	Cristian	Cristian
Marcela	Cristian	Johnny	Diego	Johnny	Johnny	Saulo	Saulo	Johnny	Johnny	Johnny
María Fernanda	Rogelio	Rogelio	Rogelio	Diego	Esteban	Rogelio	Esteban	Rogelio	Rogelio	Rogelio
María José	Esteban	Esteban	Esteban	Esteban	Rogelio	Esteban	Roberto	Diego	Saulo	Saulo
Natalia	Johnny	Cristian	Roberto	Cristian	Cristian	Cristian	Johnny	Esteban	Diego	Andrés
Rosita	Juan C	Juan C	Juan C	Juan C	Juan C	Juan C	Juan C	Juan C	Juan C	Juan C
Correct matches	3	4	2	3	3	3	2	6	7	10

Notes

- Name Unconfirmed perfect match
- Name Confirmed perfect match

=== Truth Booths ===
Couple	Episode	Result
Andrés & María Fernanda	1	Not A Match
Cristian & Marcela	2	Not A Match
Diego & Jenniffer	3	Not A Match
Andrés & Katherine	4	Not A Match
Cristian & Natalia	5	Not A Match
Juan Carlos & Rosita	6	Perfect Match
Cristian & Daniela	7	Not A Match
Roberto & Aida	8	Perfect Match
Saulo & Daniela	9	Not A Match
Saulo & María José	10	Perfect Match

== Season 2 ==
In November 2017, a second season of Are You The One: The Perfect Match was announced. The second season was filmed in Trancoso, Bahia and premiered on MTV Latin America on February 12, 2018. It was hosted by Mexican actor Vadhir Derbez. Israel Rudovsky previously competed in Big Brother Mexico. Quetzalli Bulnes was part of the second season of Mexico's Next Top Model, while Talía Loaiza stands out for having been part of Acapulco Shore.

=== Cast ===
Guys
Cast member	Age	Hometown
Adolfo De La Fuente	27	Jalisco, Mexico
Adrian Bluper	27	Guadalajara, Mexico
Andres Gonzalez	23	Medellín, Colombia
Clovis Nienow	24	Guanajuato, Mexico
Cristobal Fuentes	23	Santiago, Chile
Dan Henry	23	Guadalajara, Mexico
Eduardo Rivera	26	Tamaulipas, Mexico
Israel Rudovsky	30	Guadalajara, Mexico
Kevin Caicedo	23	Barranquilla, Colombia
Mario Albornoz	26	Monterrey, Mexico
Michel Campos	23	San Luis Potosí, Mexico
Victor Sanchez	26	Mexico City, Mexico

Girls
Cast member	Age	Hometown
Andy Chavez	23	Chihuahua, Mexico
Angie Castro	23	Barranquilla, Colombia
Connie Moll	22	Chile
Diana Molina	24	Agua Prieta, Mexico
Dianey Sahagun	21	Guadalajara, Mexico
Elizabeth Varela	21	Tepic, Mexico
Frida Alarcón	20	Mexico City, Mexico
Mariana Delgado	22	Caracas, Venezuela
Patricia "Paty" Carbajal	24	Mexico City, Mexico
Quetzalli Bulnes	29	Mexico City, Mexico
Sharon Yañez	21	Cancún, Mexico
Talia Loaiza	28	Tepito, Mexico

=== Progress ===
Guys	Week											
Guys	1	2	3	4	5	6	7	8	9	10	11	12
Adolfo	Frida	Frida	Frida	Andy	Andy	Quetzali	Mariana	Quetzali	Paty	Quetzali	Quetzali	Quetzali
Adrian	Mariana	Mariana	Diana	Diana	Diana	Sharon	Diana	Diana	Diana	Elizabeth	Dianey	Frida
Andres	Quetzali	Quetzali	Quetzali	Quetzali	Quetzali	Talía	Dianey	Sharon	Elizabeth	Frida	Diana	Paty
Clovis	Angie	Angie	Angie	Angie	Angie	Paty	Angie	Angie	Angie	Talía	Angie	Angie
Cristobal	Talía	Talía	Talía	Talía	Connie	Mariana	Talía	Talía	Talía	Angie	Talía	Talía
Dan	Elizabeth	Elizabeth	Elizabeth	Elizabeth	Elizabeth	Angie	Frida	Dianey	Connie	Sharon	Paty	Diana
Eduardo	Sharon	Sharon	Paty	Paty	Paty	Frida	Paty	Mariana	Frida	Connie	Frida	Dianey
Kevin	Paty	Diana	Mariana	Mariana	Mariana	Diana	Sharon	Frida	Dianey	Mariana	Elizabeth	Elizabeth
Mario	Diana	Paty	Sharon	Sharon	Sharon	Connie	Elizabeth	Connie	Mariana	Dianey	Sharon	Sharon
Michell	Andy	Andy	Andy	Frida	Frida	Andy	Andy	Andy	Andy	Andy	Andy	Andy
Rudo	Connie	Connie	Connie	Connie	Talía	Elizabeth	Quetzali	Paty	Sharon	Diana	Mariana	Mariana
Victor	Dianey	Dianey	Dianey	Dianey	Dianey	Dianey	Connie	Elizabeth	Quetzali	Paty	Connie	Connie
Correct matches	3	3	4	3	2	2	4	4	3	2	8	12

Girls	Week											
Girls	1	2	3	4	5	6	7	8	9	10	11	12
Andy	Michell	Michell	Michell	Adolfo	Adolfo	Michell	Michell	Michell	Michell	Michell	Michell	Michell
Angie	Clovis	Clovis	Clovis	Clovis	Clovis	Dan	Clovis	Clovis	Clovis	Cristobal	Clovis	Clovis
Connie	Rudo	Rudo	Rudo	Rudo	Cristobal	Mario	Victor	Mario	Dan	Eduardo	Victor	Víctor
Diana	Mario	Kevin	Adrian	Adrian	Adrian	Kevin	Adrian	Adrian	Adrian	Rudo	Andres	Dan
Dianey	Victor	Victor	Victor	Victor	Victor	Victor	Andrés	Dan	Kevin	Mario	Adrian	Eduardo
Elizabeth	Dan	Dan	Dan	Dan	Dan	Rudo	Mario	Victor	Andrés	Adrian	Kevin	Kevin
Frida	Adolfo	Adolfo	Adolfo	Michell	Michell	Eduardo	Dan	Kevin	Eduardo	Andres	Eduardo	Adrian
Mariana	Adrian	Adrian	Kevin	Kevin	Kevin	Cristobal	Adolfo	Eduardo	Mario	Kevin	Rudo	Rudo
Paty	Kevin	Mario	Eduardo	Eduardo	Eduardo	Clovis	Eduardo	Rudo	Adolfo	Victor	Dan	Andres
Quetzalli	Andrés	Andrés	Andrés	Andrés	Andrés	Adolfo	Rudo	Adolfo	Victor	Adolfo	Adolfo	Adolfo
Sharon	Eduardo	Eduardo	Mario	Mario	Mario	Adrian	Kevin	Andrés	Rudo	Dan	Mario	Mario
Talía	Cristobal	Cristobal	Cristobal	Cristobal	Rudo	Andrés	Cristobal	Cristobal	Cristobal	Clovis	Cristobal	Cristobal
Correct matches	3	3	4	3	2	2	4	4	3	2	8	12

Notes

- Name Unconfirmed perfect match
- Name Confirmed perfect match

=== Truth Booths ===
Couple	Episode	Result
Adolfo & Elizabeth	3	Not A Match
Kevin & Paty	8	Not A Match
Michel & Frida	13	Not A Match
Dan & Elizabeth	18	Not A Match
Clovis & Connie	23	Not A Match
Victor & Sharon	28	Not A Match
Victor & Dianey	33	Not A Match
Eduardo & Paty	38	Not A Match
Mario & Quetzali	43	Not A Match
Michell & Andy	48	Perfect Match
Mario & Sharon	53	Perfect Match
Eduardo & Dianey	58	Perfect Match

==== After filming ====
Dianey Sahagún in 2018 appeared on the first season of the Mexican version of the reality show Ex on the Beach.

Clovis Nienow later participated in the first version of Resistiré in 2019, and in 2021 Jugando con Fuego Latino and Por amor o por dinero. In 2024 he entered La casa de los famosos, being eliminated in 13th place.

While Elizabeth Varela competed in the second version of Resistiré in 2021 and has been part of Acapulco Shore since 2022. In 2024 he competed in the fifth season of the Mexican version of Survivor.

Mario Albornoz appeared on the first season of De Férias com o Ex Caribe.
