= Acapulco Shore series 11 =

Acapulco Shore
- Season 11
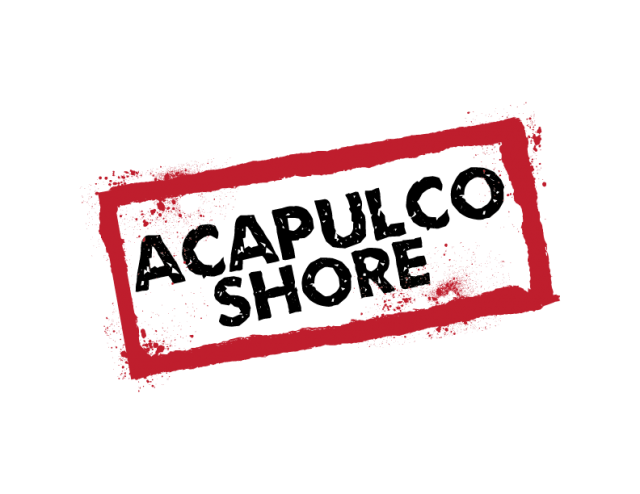
- No. of episodes: 13

Release
- Original network: MTV
- Original release: 5 September – 28 November 2023

Season chronology
- ← Previous; Series 10

The eleventh series of Acapulco Shore, a Mexican television program based in Acapulco, was announced in July 2023 and was released on September 5 of that same year. Filming took place in April 2023. The cast members attended the 2023 MTV MIAW Awards pink carpet, before being officially introduced a week later. It is the first season not to feature any original cast members. It marks the return of Leslie Gallardo, who only appeared in the fifth season, and also Isabel Castro, who left after last season. New cast members this season include Abigail Salazar, Andrea Otaola, Jesús Esparza, and Regina Coquet. The first trailer was released on August 6, 2023. Javier Barrera, Claudia Ariz and Sofía Lozano entered as a supporting cast. It also features the brief return of Jibranne Bazán.

== Cast ==
- Abel Robles
- Abigail Salazar
- Alba Zepeda
- Andrea Otaola
- Eduardo "Chile" Miranda
- Elizabeth Varela
- Isabel Castro (Episodes 9–11)
- Jesús "Chuy" Esparza
- Leslie Gallardo
- Regina "Rexx" Coquet
- Ricardo "Ricky" Ochoa
- Roberto "Robbie" Mora
- Sebastián Galvez

=== Special guest ===
- Claudia Ariz (Episodes 10–11)
- Javier "Javo" Barrera (Episodes 7–9)
- Jibranne "Jey" Bazán (Episodes 11–13)
- Sofía Lozano (Episodes 8–10)

=== Duration of cast ===
Cast members	Season 11												
Cast members	1	2	3	4	5	6	7	8	9	10	11	12	13
Abel													
Abigail													
Alba													
Andrea													
Claudia													
Eduardo													
Elizabeth													
Isabel													
Javier													
Jesús													
Jibranne													
Leslie													
Regina													
Ricardo													
Roberto													
Sebastián													
Sofía													

= Cast member is featured in this episode.
= Cast member arrives in the house.
= Cast member voluntarily leaves the house.
= Cast member leaves and returns to the house in the same episode.
= Cast member returns to the house.
= Cast member leaves the series.
= Cast member returns to the series.
= "Cast member" is not a cast member in this episode.

== Episodes ==
Note: Some episode titles have been adapted to a more understandable English translation

No. overall	No. in season	Title	Duration	Original release date
137	1	"Partying In Acapulco"	60 minutes	5 September 2023
138	2	"Bone of Contention"	60 minutes	12 September 2023
139	3	"Don't Take It Personal"	60 minutes	19 September 2023
140	4	"A Surprise Gift"	60 minutes	26 September 2023
141	5	"I Don't Give Warnings"	60 minutes	3 October 2023
142	6	"This Party Is Not Over!"	60 minutes	10 October 2023
143	7	"And Surprises Aren't Over"	60 minutes	17 October 2023
144	8	"Chapulineo"	60 minutes	24 October 2023
145	9	"Episode 9"	60 minutes	31 October 2023
146	10	"A difficult decision"	60 minutes	7 November 2023
147	11	"A lesbian in trouble"	60 minutes	14 November 2023
148	12	"the girl in trouble"	60 minutes	21 November 2023
149	13	"The holidays are over"	60 minutes	28 November 2023
