= Resistiré (Chilean TV series) =

Chilean reality TV series

- Genre: Reality competition
- Created by: Kevin Lee
- Based on: Stranded with a Million Dollars
- Presented by: Diana Bolocco; Facundo Gómez
- Countries of origin: Chile; Mexico
- Original language: Spanish
- No. of seasons: 1
- No. of episodes: 95

Production
- Executive producer: Ignacio Corvalán
- Production location: Andes
- Running time: 10 minutes

Original release
- Network: Mega; Azteca 7 MTV Latin America; MTV Spain; Unimas (United States)
- Release: March 17 – July 25, 2019

Related
- MTV RE$I$TIRÉ

Resistiré is a Chilean reality television series broadcast on Mega , Azteca 7, MTV Latin America and MTV Spain which will force a group of contestants to literally answer the question "How much would you pay to survive?". The series drops twenty four adventurers in a house with nothing but the clothes on their backs and $500,000 in cash.

Launched on March 17, 2019, with Diana Bolocco and Facundo Gómez hosting the show.

The season finale was aired on July 25, 2019, where Mario Sepúlveda was named the winner.

== Production ==
The program premiered on 17 March 2019 on Chilean television network Mega. The program's headquarters is an hour away from Santiago and, as a strategy, the network did not reveal the place in order to maintain the isolation of the members. The premise of the show is based on the MTV series Stranded with a Million Dollars, but with the addition of a large number of characters, children and foreigners, isolated over several months, and with the risk of being eliminated not because they were unable to tolerate extreme conditions as in the original show, but due to the program's traditional physical games.

In Resistiré , the 24 participants will be abandoned in a shelter -located in the Andes Mountains- in the middle of nowhere without beds, indoor bathrooms, food nor potable water supply, but with half a million dollars that corresponds to the final prize. With that money, they would buy the items they need to survive but with a higher price and through a decision that needs a majoritary consensus in order to be done.

== Contestants ==
List of Resistiré, ¿Cuánto estás dispuesto a transar por medio millón de dólares? contestants
Contestant	Occupation	Age	Original team	First switched team	Second switched team	Day entered	Day exited	Finish	Previously
Mario Sepúlveda	Miner	48	Orange	Orange	Orange	1	75	Winner	13th eliminated
Teresa Kuster	Model	30	Orange	Blue	Blue	1	75	Runner-up	
Federico Farrell	Model and singer	32	Orange	Orange	Orange	1	75	3rd place	13th eliminated
Aída Nízar	Lawer and communicator	43	Orange	Blue	Blue	1	75	Semifinalist	
Ariel Levy	Actor and wrestler	34	Orange	Orange	Blue	1	75	Semifinalist	
Manelyk González	Model and singer	28	Blue	Orange	Orange	1	75	Semifinalist	13th eliminated
Clovis Nienow	Actor and model	25	Orange	Blue	Blue	2	75	Semifinalist	
Laura Prieto	Model and actress	33	Blue	Blue	Blue	1	75	Semifinalist	
Sebastián Ramírez	Public relations	32	Blue	Blue	Blue	31	75	Semifinalist	
Isaac Torres	Spinning instructor	23	Blue	Blue	Blue	1	74	14th eliminated	
Jessica Pires	Model and receptionist	27	Orange	Orange	Orange	1	73	13th eliminated	
Keyla Caputo	Model	24	Orange	Orange	Orange	2	73	13th eliminated	
Luis "Sargento" Sánchez	Singer	28	Orange	Orange	Orange	1	73	13th eliminated	
Francisca Undurraga	Model	32	Orange	Orange	Orange	31	72	Evacued	
Ignacia Michelson	Law student	25	Blue	Orange	Orange	1 / 17	2 / 65	12th eliminated	1st eliminated
Gabriel Martina	Model and actor	36		Orange	Orange	45	59	11th eliminated	
Margot Corvalán	Model	30		Blue	Blue	50	59	10th eliminated	
Zuleidy Aguilar	TV Host and model	26	Orange	Blue	Orange	1	58	9th eliminated	
Boris Sánchez	Actor and dancer	29	Blue	Blue		2	51	8th eliminated	
Alexandra Monsalve	Businesswoman	31	Blue	Blue		1	47	Expelled	
Felipe "Fritanga" Urra	YouTuber	26	Blue	Blue		1	47	Abandonet	
Cass Zamorano	Veterinary medicine student	30	Blue	Blue		2 / 9	9 / 44	7th eliminated	2nd eliminated
Álex Caniggia	Singer	26	Orange	Orange		1 / 34	16 / 43	Abandonet	3rd eliminated
Charlotte Caniggia	TV Personality	26	Blue	Blue		34	43	Abandonet	
Sara Pimentel	Kinesiology student	26	Orange			1	37	6th eliminated	
Rodrigo "Dino" Inostroza	Accounting professor	30	Blue			1	35	Expelled	
Eleazar Gómez	Actor and singer	32	Blue			1	30	5th eliminated	
Carolina "Krespita" Rodríguez	Boxer	35	Blue			1	23	4th eliminated	
Erick "Ji-Hu" Sánchez	YouTuber	23	Blue			1	14	Abandonet	

== Nominations table ==
	Week 1		Week 2	Week 3	Week 4	Week 5	Week 6	Week 7	Week 8	Week 9		Week 10	Week 11			
	Day 2	Day 9	Week 2	Week 3	Week 4	Week 5	Week 6	Week 7	Week 8	Day 59	Day 65	Week 10	Day 73	Day 74	Day 75	Finale
Leaders	Krespita	Ariel	Laura	Eleazar	Dino	Sargento	Jessica	Ariel	Aída	(none)	~~Laura~~	Mario	(none)			
Leaders	Sargento	Manelyk	Mario	Jessica	Federico	Sebastián	Laura	Clovis	Federico	(none)	Manelyk	Teresa	(none)			
Winning team	Orange	Orange	Blue	Orange	Orange	Blue	Orange	Orange	Orange	(none)	Blue	Blue	(none)			
Betrayed by losing leader	Ignacia	Cass	Alexander	Alexandra	Cass	Mario	Alexandra	~~Alexandra~~	Zuleidy	(none)	Jessica	Francisca	(none)			
Nominated by winning team	Eleazar	Ji-Hu	Aída	Boris	Boris	Federico	Clovis	Boris	Clovis	(none)	Sargento	Federico	(none)			
Nominated in the bonfire of the betrayed	Isaac	Alexandra	Ariel	Cass	Eleazar	Sara	Cass	Isaac	Laura	(none)	Ignacia	Jessica	(none)			
Nominated by temptation	(none)				Jessica	Clovis	(none)			(none)	(none)	Isaac	(none)			
Nominated in the last trial	(none)	Alexander	Zuleidy	Krespita	Sara	Cass	Zuleidy	Laura	Jessica	(none)	Laura	Sargento	(none)			
Saved from going to duel	Eleazar	Alexander; Ji-Hu	Aída; Ariel	Alexandra; Cass	Cass; Jessica; Sara	Cass; Federico; Mario	Alexandra; Clovis	Laura	Jessica; Laura	(none)	Laura; Sargento	Isaac	(none)			
Final nominees	Ignacia; Isaac	Alexandra; Cass	Alexander; Zuleidy	Boris; Krespita	Boris; Eleazar	Clovis; Sara	Cass; Zuleidy	Boris; Isaac	Clovis; Zuleidy	(none)	Ignacia; Jessica	Federico; Francisca; Jessica; Sargento	(none)			
Mario	Ignacia	Alexander	Cass	Krespita	Ignacia	Cass	Boris	Laura	Margot	Not eligible	Laura	Laura	Losing team	Isaac	Teresa; Federico; Ariel	Winner (Day 75)
Teresa	Ignacia	Eleazar	Cass	Krespita	Ignacia	Cass	Manelyk	Ignacia	Margot	Not eligible	Mario	Sargento	Winning team	Manelyk	Federico; Mario; Aída	Runner-up (Day 75)
Federico	Ignacia	Alexander	Cass	Krespita	Ignacia	Cass	Boris	Laura	Margot	Not eligible	Laura	Laura	Losing team	Sebastián	Teresa; Mario; Aída	3rd place (Day 75)
Aída	Ignacia	Dino	Cass	Krespita	Zuleidy	Manelyk	Zuleidy	Jessica	Jessica	Gabriel	Federico	Sargento	Winning team	Sebastián	Mario; Teresa; Federico	Eliminated (Day 75)
Ariel	Ignacia	Aida	Cass	Aída	Fritanga	Cass	Bois	Sebastián	Jessica	Not eligible	Mario	Sargento	Winning team	Manelyk	Mario; Laura; Teresa	Eliminated (Day 75)
Manelyk	Ignacia	Aída	Zuleidy	Aída	Sara	Cass	Boris	Keyla	Margot	Margot	Laura	Laura	Losing team	Isaac	Teresa; Sebastián; Clovis	Eliminated (Day 75)
Clovis	Not in House	Alexander	Cass	Krespita	Fritanga	Cass	Zuleidy	Mario	Jessica	Not eligible	Mario	Sargento	Winning team	Isaac	Manelyk; Mario; Teresa	Eliminated (Day 75)
Laura	Ignacia	Alexander	Zuleidy	Aída	Sara	Alexandra	Zuleidy	Ignacia	Jessica	Not eligible	Mario	Sargento	Winning team	Isaac	Mario; Ariel; Aída	Eliminated (Day 75)
Sebastián	Not in House					Boris	Zuleidy	Gabriel	Gabriel	Not eligible	Isaac	Sargento	Winning team	Isaac	Manelyk; Federico; Mario	Eliminated (Day 75)
Isaac	Nominated	Alexander	Zuleidy	Aída	Sara	Jessica	Zuleidy	Ignacia	Jessica	Not eligible	Mario	Sargento	Winning team	Sebastián	Eliminated (Day 74)	
Jessica	Ignacia	Alexander	Cass	Krespita	Ignacia	Cass	Boris	Laura	Margot	Not eligible	Laura	Laura	Losing team	Eliminated (Day 73)		
Keyla	Not in House	Alexander	Boris	Laura	Ariel	Cass	Boris	Laura	Margot	Not eligible	Laura	Laura	Losing team	Eliminated (Day 73)		
Sargento	Ignacia	Alexander	Cass	Krespita	Fritanga	Cass	Boris	Laura	Jessica	Not eligible	Laura	Laura	Losing team	Eliminated (Day 73)		
Francisca	Not in House					Charlotte	Alexander	Sebastián	Jessica	Not eligible	Laura	Laura	Evacuated (Day 72)			
Ignacia	Nominated	Eliminated (Day 2)		Aída	Sara	Jessica	Boris	Laura	Jessica	Not eligible	Laura	Eliminated (Day 65)				
Gabriel	Not in House						No voting	Laura	Margot	Not eligible	Eliminated (Day 59)					
Margot	Not in House							Ignacia	Jessica	Not eligible	Eliminated (Day 59)					
Zuleidy	Ignacia	Alexander	Cass	Krespita	Ignacia	Cass	Isaac	Laura	Margot	Eliminated (Day 58)						
Boris	Not in House	Alexander	Zuleidy	Clovis	Sara	Cass	Sargento	Ignacia	Eliminated (Day 51)							
Alexandra	Ignacia	Aída	Zuleidy	Aída	Sara	Aída	Zuleidy	No voting	Walked (Day 48)							
Fritanga	None	Alexander	Zuleidy	Sargento	Sara	Zuleidy	Zuleidy	No voting	Walked (Day 47)							
Cass	Not in House	Alexander	Zuleidy	Sargento	Sara	Manelyk	Zuleidy	Eliminated (Day 44)								
Alexander	None	Fritanga	Fritanga	Eliminated (Day 16)		Cass	Francisca	Walked (Day 43)								
Charlotte	Not in House					Cass	Zuleidy	Walked (Day 43)								
Sara	None	Alexander	Cass	Krespita	Ignacia	Cass	Eliminated (Day 37)									
Dino	None	Aída	Zuleidy	Aída	Sara	No voting	Ejected (Day 35)									
Eleazar	None	Aída	Zuleidy	Aída	Sara	Eliminated (Day 30)										
Krespita	Ignacia	Alexander	Zuleidy	Aída	Eliminated (Day 23)											
Ji-Hu	None	Aída	No voting	Walked (Day 14)												
Notes	1	2	(none)	3	4	(none)	5	(none)	6	7	8	9	10	11	12	(none)
Departures	(none)		Ji-Hu	(none)		Dino	Charlotte; Alexander	Fritanga; Alexandra	(none)			Francisca	(none)			
Eliminated	Ignacia; 12 of 18 votes to eliminate	Cass; Lost duel	Alexander; Lost duel	Krespita; Lost duel	Eleazar; Lost duel	Sara; Lost duel	Cass; Lost duel	Boris; Lost duel	Zuleidy; Lost duel	Margot; Manelyk's vote to eliminate	Ignacia; Lost duel	Elimination cancelled	Federico; Lost challenge	Isaac; 5 of 10 votes to eliminate	Sebastián; 1 of 27 votes to be finalist	Federico; 17.79% to win
Eliminated	Ignacia; 12 of 18 votes to eliminate	Cass; Lost duel	Alexander; Lost duel	Krespita; Lost duel	Eleazar; Lost duel	Sara; Lost duel	Cass; Lost duel	Boris; Lost duel	Zuleidy; Lost duel	Margot; Manelyk's vote to eliminate	Ignacia; Lost duel	Elimination cancelled	Jessica; Lost challenge	Isaac; 5 of 10 votes to eliminate	Laura; 1 of 27 votes to be finalist	Federico; 17.79% to win
Eliminated	Ignacia; 12 of 18 votes to eliminate	Cass; Lost duel	Alexander; Lost duel	Krespita; Lost duel	Eleazar; Lost duel	Sara; Lost duel	Cass; Lost duel	Boris; Lost duel	Zuleidy; Lost duel	Margot; Manelyk's vote to eliminate	Ignacia; Lost duel	Elimination cancelled	Keyla; Lost challenge	Isaac; 5 of 10 votes to eliminate	Clovis; 1 of 27 votes to be finalist	Teresa; 27.05% to win
Eliminated	Ignacia; 12 of 18 votes to eliminate	Cass; Lost duel	Alexander; Lost duel	Krespita; Lost duel	Eleazar; Lost duel	Sara; Lost duel	Cass; Lost duel	Boris; Lost duel	Zuleidy; Lost duel	Gabriel; Aída's vote to eliminate	Ignacia; Lost duel	Elimination cancelled	Manelyk; Lost challenge	Isaac; 5 of 10 votes to eliminate	Manelyk; 2 of 27 votes to be finalist	Teresa; 27.05% to win
Eliminated	Ignacia; 12 of 18 votes to eliminate	Cass; Lost duel	Alexander; Lost duel	Krespita; Lost duel	Eleazar; Lost duel	Sara; Lost duel	Cass; Lost duel	Boris; Lost duel	Zuleidy; Lost duel	Gabriel; Aída's vote to eliminate	Ignacia; Lost duel	Elimination cancelled	Mario; Lost challenge	Isaac; 5 of 10 votes to eliminate	Ariel; 2 of 27 votes to be finalist	Mario; 55.16% to win
Eliminated	Ignacia; 12 of 18 votes to eliminate	Cass; Lost duel	Alexander; Lost duel	Krespita; Lost duel	Eleazar; Lost duel	Sara; Lost duel	Cass; Lost duel	Boris; Lost duel	Zuleidy; Lost duel	Gabriel; Aída's vote to eliminate	Ignacia; Lost duel	Elimination cancelled	Sargento; Lost challenge	Isaac; 5 of 10 votes to eliminate	Aída; 3 of 27 votes to be finalist	Mario; 55.16% to win

=== Notes ===
This contestant was the Leader of her/him team.
This contestant was nominated for elimination before the last trial.
This contestant was initially nominated, but was saved from going to duel and secured immunity for the week.

- ^Note 1: During day 2, they voted in an "Extraordinary Trial" if they wanted to eliminate Ignacia or Isaac to recover the lost money or none and not recover the money.
- ^Note 2: Cass was eliminated but reenters by decision of Boris in exchange for $20,000.
- ^Note 3: Ignacia was returned by decision of Eleazar in exchange for $20,000.
- ^Note 4: Alexander returned to the competition with his sister Charlotte.
- ^Note 5: During week 6, the teams were switched.
- ^Note 6: During week 8, the teams were switched.
- ^Note 7: Aída and Manelyk were voted as the favorites of the public, so both had to eliminate someone from the opposing team..
- ^Note 8: Laura lost her immunity, because Ignacia took that right away.
- ^Note 9: Due to Francisca's evacuation from the game, Week 10's elimination was cancelled.
- ^Note 10: During day 73, the orange team lost the competition, so they were eliminated from the game, but Federico, Manelyk and Mario were returned by the public.
- ^Note 11: During day 74, they voted in an "Extraordinary Trial" to eliminate one of them.
- ^Note 12: During day 75, the last nine contestants voted for the three contestants who wanted them to be the finalists.

== Summary statistics ==
- Entries in **bold text** indicates nominees who transformed into dualists

	Week 1		Week 2	Week 3	Week 4	Week 5	Week 6	Week 7	Week 8	Week 9		Week 10	Week 11			
	Day 2	Day 9	Week 2	Week 3	Week 4	Week 5	Week 6	Week 7	Week 8	Day 59	Day 65	Week 10	Day 73	Day 74	Day 75	Finale
Mario	Safe	Safe	Leader	Safe	Nominated	Safe	Safe	Safe	Safe	Safe	Safe	Leader	Loser	Safe	Finalist	Winner
Teresa	Safe	Safe	Safe	Safe	Safe	Safe	Safe	Safe	Safe	Safe	Safe	Leader	Win	Safe	Finalist	Runner-up
Federico	Safe	Safe	Safe	Safe	Leader	Nominated	Safe	Safe	Leader	Safe	Safe	~~**Nominated**~~	Loser	Safe	Finalist	3rd place
Aída	Safe	Safe	Nominated	Safe	Safe	Safe	Safe	Safe	Leader	Favorite	Safe	Safe	Win	Safe	**Not Chosen**	Eliminated
Ariel	Safe	Leader	Nominated	Safe	Safe	Safe	Safe	Leader	Safe	Safe	Safe	Safe	Win	Safe	**Not Chosen**	Eliminated
Manelyk	Safe	Leader	Safe	Safe	Safe	Safe	Safe	Safe	Safe	Favorite	Leader	Safe	Loser	Safe	**Not Chosen**	Eliminated
Clovis	Not House	Safe	Safe	Safe	Safe	**Nominated**	Nominated	Leader	**Nominated**	Safe	Safe	Safe	Win	Safe	**Not Chosen**	Eliminated
Laura	Safe	Safe	Leader	Safe	Safe	Safe	Leader	Nominated	Nominated	Safe	Nominated	Safe	Win	Safe	**Not Chosen**	Eliminated
Sebastián	Not House					Leader	Safe	Safe	Safe	Safe	Safe	Safe	Win	Safe	**Not Chosen**	Eliminated
Isaac	**Nominated**	Safe	Safe	Safe	Safe	Safe	Safe	**Nominated**	Safe	Safe	Safe	Nominated	Win	**Chosen**	Eliminated	
Jessica	Safe	Safe	Safe	Leader	Nominated	Safe	Leader	Safe	Nominated	Safe	**Nominated**	~~**Nominated**~~	Loser	Eliminated		
Keyla	Not House	Safe	Safe	Safe	Safe	Safe	Safe	Safe	Safe	Safe	Safe	Safe	Loser	Eliminated		
Sargento	Leader	Safe	Safe	Safe	Safe	Leader	Safe	Safe	Safe	Safe	Nominated	~~**Nominated**~~	Loser	Eliminated		
Francisca	Not House					Safe	Safe	Safe	Safe	Safe	Safe	~~**Nominated**~~	Evacued			
Ignacia	**Nominated**	Eliminated		Safe	Safe	Safe	Safe	Safe	Safe	Safe	**Nominated**	Eliminated				
Gabriel	Not House						Safe	Safe	Safe	**Chosen**	Eliminated					
Margot	Not House							Safe	Safe	**Chosen**	Eliminated					
Zuleidy	Safe	Safe	**Nominated**	Safe	Safe	Safe	**Nominated**	Safe	**Nominated**	Eliminated						
Boris	Safe	Safe	Safe	Nominated	**Nominated**	Safe	Safe	**Nominated**	Eliminated							
Alexandra	Safe	Nominated	Safe	Nominated	Safe	Safe	Nominated	~~Nominated~~	Abandoned							
Fritanga	Safe	Safe	Safe	Safe	Safe	Safe	Safe	Safe	Abandoned							
Cass	Not House	**Nominated**	Eliminated	Nominated	Nominated	Nominated	**Nominated**	Eliminated								
Álex	Safe	Nominated	**Nominated**	Eliminated		Safe	Safe	Abandoned								
Charlotte	Not House					Safe	Safe	Abandoned								
Sara	Safe	Safe	Safe	Safe	Nominated	**Nominated**	Eliminated									
Dino	Safe	Safe	Safe	Safe	Leader	Safe	Ejected									
Eleazar	Nominated	Safe	Safe	Leader	**Nominated**	Eliminated										
Krespita	Leader	Safe	Safe	**Nominated**	Eliminated											
Ji-Hu	Safe	Nominated	Abandoned													
