= MTV (Spanish TV channel) =

Spanish pay television channel

MTV Spain
- Logo used since 14 September 2021
- Country: Spain
- Broadcast area: Spain; Andorra
- Headquarters: Madrid, Spain

Programming
- Picture format: 1080i HDTV (downscaled to 16:9 576i for the SDTV feed)

Ownership
- Owner: Skydance Europe
- Sister channels: Nickelodeon; Comedy Central

History
- Launched: 10 September 2000; 26 years ago 15 September 2010; 16 years ago (DTT)
- Replaced: MTV Europe
- Closed: 7 February 2014; 12 years ago (DTT)

Links
- Website: mtv.es (redirects to mtv.com/global)

Availability

Streaming media
- Sky: Via OTT

MTV is a Spanish pay television channel which focused its programming on general entertainment and music. It was launched on 10 September 2000, as the Spanish version of the American cable television channel, replacing the Pan-European version of MTV, and was owned by Paramount Skydance. From 2010 to 2014, the channel was available on Spanish digital terrestrial television until the channel returned exclusively to pay television due to low viewership.

== History ==
MTV Spain launched on 10 September 2000, and aired localised content and content from MTV Europe. The channel launched with localised versions of MTV shows such as Hitlist España, MTV Select and MTV Hot. When it launched, the channel was available to all digital television viewers across Spain and the Canary Islands. MTV Spain was part of MTV Networks Southern Europe and often shared similar on-air identities as MTV Italy and MTV France. In 2010, after an agreement between Viacom and Vocento on 3 August 2010, MTV began broadcasting on digital terrestrial television on September 15.

On 1 July 2011, MTV Spain adapted its corporate image by removing the name "Music Television" under the logo and cutting it in half sharing a similar on-air identity to MTV's other global channels.

On 31 January 2014, it was announced that MTV would be removed from digital terrestrial television on 7 February 2014. While the channel returned exclusively to Canal+, in the rest of the paid operators the channel was replaced by another channel or completely removed from its programming offer. On 7 April 2014, the frequency where MTV broadcast disappeared due to the judgment of the Supreme Court of Justice, promoted by the Popular Party, to annul the free broadcasting concessions for nine channels because they were granted without proper licenses. For this reason, MTV was not replaced by another channel on DTT.

Despite having relegated music to the background, MTV continued to broadcast music daily, with programming blocks such as "100% MTV", composed entirely of music videos from genres such as R&B, Hip-Hop, EDM, Rock, and Indie. In early June 2016, this block was renamed "MTV Insomnia". In addition, the channel broadcast music on a block called "#MañanasMusicalesMTV" from morning to afternoon on weekends. Shortly after its return to Canal+, MTV began broadcasting concerts during central time.

After almost a year of exclusivity on Canal+, the channel joined Telecable on 7 January 2015, and on Movistar TV on 20 February. It continued to be part of Movistar+ after the merger of Canal+ and Movistar TV.

On 1 December 2015, the channel rejoined Vodafone TV on channel 37 after the channel's removal from DTT nearly two years earlier.

On 7 September 2016, MTV Spain's high definition signal was launched exclusively for Vodafone TV and Telecable subscribers.

On 17 September 2018, MTV launched My MTV, a customisable music television channel.

== Former presenters ==
- Johann Wald (Top20 MTV Hits, Top20 MTV Selection)
- Laura Hayden (Top20 MTV Hits, Top20 MTV Selection)
- Duo Kie (MTV Tuning España)
- Claudia González (Select MTV)
- Miguel Such (Select MTV)
- Artur Palomo Ramos (Select MTV)
- Deborah Ombres (MTV Hot)
- Guillem Caballé (MTV Kabuki, MTV Top 20 Spain)
- Mario Vaquerizo (MTV Video of the Year)
- Olvido Gara (MTV Video of the Year)
