= Fernando Lozada =

Mexico media personality (born 1989)

- Born: Juan Fernando Lozada Zuñiga; August 10, 1989 (age 37); México
- Occupations: Media personality; Host
- Years active: 2014–present
- Spouse: Triana Lion (m. 2020; separation 2025)
- Partner(s): Triana Lion (2016–2020)
- Children: 1

Fernando Lozada (born August 10, 1989) is a Mexican television personality of Mexican origin, known for being a cast member in the MTV reality series Acapulco Shore.

== Biography ==
Lozada is a descendant of a Colombian father Juan Carlos Lozada and his Mexican mother Benicia Zuñiga. At the time of birth he suffered from Itericia, bilirubin in the blood. In his early years he lived in countries like Colombia, United States and Panama. After his parents divorced in 1990, he settled primarily in Mexico City.

== Career ==
In 2014 he joined the first season of Acapulco Shore, being a prominent member during the first six editions of the program. In 2016 he joined Super Shore, another spin-off of MTV's Shore franchise.

Lozada hosted the dating show SwipeDate with Yoseline Hoffman in 2017. After voluntarily leaving both MTV shows, Lozada competed in the fourth season of Exatlón Estados Unidos, being eliminated a week before the final.

Since 2021 he has been the host of Acapulco Shock.

Lozada came in second place on the Telemundo show, Los 50. In January 2024, his participation in the fourth season of La casa de los famosos was confirmed. Later that year, he competed in La Isla: Desafío Grecia y Turquía.

== Personal life ==
He met Triana Lion in 2012 in Cuernavaca, and after dating intermittently, they began a relationship in 2016, after which he abandoned the filming of Super Shore. During a trip to Walt Disney World in 2017, Lozada proposed to León and they married in December 2020 in a private ceremony.

The couple's first child was born on July 2, 2020. In May 2025, the couple shared the announcement of their separation through their social media.

== Filmography ==
Year	Title	Role	Notes
2014–2016, 2018–2019	Acapulco Shore	Himself	Cast member (seasons 1–3, 5–6); 59 episodes
2016	Super Shore	Himself	Cast member (seasons 1–2); 25 episodes
2017	Acapulco Shore: Placer Sin Culpa	Himself	Television special; 4 episodes
2017	#SwipeDate	Himself	Host with Yoss Hoffman
2018–2021	Acaplay	Himself	Television special; 27 episodes
2020, 2025	Exatlón Estados Unidos	Himself	23rd Eliminated (season 4); Voluntary abandonment (season 10)
2020	Exatlón: Torneo de temporadas	Himself	Winner (television episode)
2021	Papi Shore	Himself	Main cast
2022–2023	Acapulco Shock	Himself	Host (season 2–4)
2022	MTV RE$I$TIRÉ	Himself	Winner; 20 episodes
2023	Los 50	Himself	Runner-up; 50 episodes (season 1)
2024	La casa de los famosos	Himself	3rd Eliminated (season 4)
2024	Sueltos en Los Cabos	Himself	Commentator
2024	La Isla: Desafío Grecia y Turquía	Himself	Winner (season 8)
2025	Al Extremo	Himself	Host
2026	La Granja VIP	Himself	Farmer (season 2)
