= La casa de los famosos season 2 =

American television reality program

La casa de los famosos
- Season 2
- Hosted by: Héctor Sandarti; Jimena Gallego
- No. of days: 91
- No. of houseguests: 17
- Winner: Ivonne Montero
- Runner-up: Salvador Zerboni
- No. of episodes: 77

Release
- Original network: Telemundo
- Original release: May 10 – August 8, 2022

Season chronology
- ← Previous; Season 1 Next → Season 3

The second season of the American Spanish-language reality television series La casa de los famosos premiered on May 10, 2022, with a live move-in on Telemundo. The show follows a group of celebrities living in a house together while being constantly filmed with no communication with the outside world as they compete to be the last competitor remaining to win the cash grand prize.

The season was announced on November 16, 2021. Héctor Sandarti and Jimena Gallego returned as hosts of the series. The panelists for Sunday episodes were previous season's winner Alicia Machado, alongside Omar Chaparro, Yolanda Andrade and Roberto Palazuelos.

The season concluded on August 8, 2022, after 91 days of competition with Ivonne Montero being crowned the winner, and Salvador Zerboni the runner-up.

== Format ==
The season follows 17 celebrities living in a house together with no communication with the outside world and are constantly filmed during their time in the house. During their stay the Housemates share their thoughts on events of the house inside a private room referred to as the Confesionario (Confession Room). Each week, the housemates compete in the Head of Household competition, with the winner being immune from eviction. Each housemate has three nomination points to give to two housemates, giving 2 points to one housemate and 1 point to the other. The housemates with the most nomination points are put up for eviction and the Head of Household must save one of the nominees. A change this season is that the four housemates with the most nomination points are put up for eviction, unlike the previous season where the top three were put up for eviction. The public at home is able to vote on which housemate to evict via the show's main website. Beginning the eighth week, the public had to vote on which housemate they wanted to stay in the house, with the least voted housemate being evicted. Each week the housemates are assigned tasks in order to win their allowance for food.

=== Twists ===
==== Spontaneous Nomination ====
During episode 6, the Spontaneous Nomination was introduced. The spontaneous nomination gives only one houseguest per week the advantage to give nomination points of 3 and 2 instead of the usual 2 and 1. The spontaneous nomination is open immediately after the eviction and closes before the regular nomination process. The spontaneous nomination phase concluded after week 6 nominations.

== Housemates ==
The seventeen HouseGuests were announced throughout April and May 2022.

Name	Age on entry	Notability	Status
Ivonne Montero	48	Actress	Winner; Day 91
Salvador Zerboni	43	Actor	Runner-up; Day 91
Ignacio "Nacho" Casano	41	Actor	3rd Place; Day 91
Toni Costa	38	Dancer & choreographer	4th Place; Day 91
Daniella Navarro	38	Actress	5th Place; Day 86
Laura Bozzo	70	Talk show host	Evicted; Day 84
Natalia Alcocer	33	Actress & TV personality	Evicted; Day 77
Juan Vidal	45	Actor	Evicted; Day 70
Lewis Mendoza	29	Model & TV personality	Evicted; Day 63
Rafael Nieves	33	Actor	Evicted; Day 56
Osvaldo Ríos	61	Actor	Evicted; Day 49
Niurka Marcos	54	Actress & TV personality	Evicted; Day 42
Julia Gama	28	Miss Brazil 2020, first runner-up in Miss Universe 2020	Evicted; Day 35
Eduardo Rodríguez	48	Actor	Evicted; Day 28
Luis "Potro" Caballero	29	Influencer & TV personality	Evicted; Day 21
Brenda Zambrano	28	Influencer & TV personality	Evicted; Day 14
Mayeli Alonso	37	Businesswoman	Evicted; Day 7

== Nominations table ==
Every week, each participant is called to nominate two of their housemates, with the exception of that week's Head of Household. The first person a housemate nominates is for 2 points, whilst the second nomination is for just 1 point. The three participants with highest points, are nominated for elimination and it is up to the public's vote through Telemundo.com who gets evicted that week.

This housemate was the Head of Household, and could not be nominated.
This housemate was immune from eviction.
This housemate was automatically put up for eviction.

	Week 1	Week 2	Week 3	Week 4	Week 5	Week 6	Week 7	Week 8	Week 9	Week 10	Week 11	Week 12	Week 13		
	Week 1	Week 2	Week 3	Week 4	Week 5	Week 6	Week 7	Week 8	Week 9	Week 10	Week 11	Week 12	Day 86	Finale	
Ivonne	Nacho; Osvaldo	Potro; Brenda	Eduardo; Daniella	Laura; Salvador	Rafael; Julia	Niurka; Lewis	Laura; Natalia	Daniella; Laura	Lewis; Toni	Natalia; Juan	Daniella; Nacho	Laura; Daniella	No; Nominations	Winner (Day 91)	
Salvador	Toni; Osvaldo	Nacho; Natalia	Lewis; Nacho	Natalia; Juan	Natalia; Juan	Lewis; Osvaldo	Osvaldo; Ivonne	~~Juan~~; ~~Nacho~~	Nacho; Lewis	Natalia; Juan	Toni; Natalia	Toni; Nacho	No; Nominations	Runner-up (Day 91)	
Nacho	Brenda; Niurka	Brenda; Natalia	Potro; Natalia	Laura; Eduardo	Rafael; Julia	Rafael; Salvador	Rafael; Salvador	Daniella; Rafael	Laura; Daniella	Salvador; Laura	Daniella; Salvador	Daniella; Salvador	No; Nominations	Third place (Day 91)	
Toni	Natalia; Eduardo	Niurka; Potro	Niurka; Laura	Laura; Salvador	Salvador; Nacho	Niurka; Daniella	Salvador; Laura	Salvador; Rafael	Nacho; Ivonne	Ivonne; Laura	Salvador; Laura	Salvador; Laura	No; Nominations	Fourth place (Day 91)	
Daniella	Nacho; Juan	Natalia; Niurka	Juan; Natalia	Juan; Natalia	~~Juan~~; ~~Natalia~~	Lewis; Osvaldo	Osvaldo; Ivonne	~~Ivonne~~; ~~Nacho~~	Nacho; Lewis	Juan; Natalia	Natalia; Toni	Nacho; Toni	No; Nominations	Fifth place (Day 86)	
Laura	Nacho; Eduardo	Natalia; Nacho	~~Niurka~~; ~~Ivonne~~	Natalia; Juan	Natalia; Juan	Osvaldo; Lewis	Ivonne; Toni	~~Nacho~~; ~~Ivonne~~	Nacho; Ivonne	Juan; Natalia	Natalia; Toni	Toni; Nacho	Evicted (Day 84)		
Natalia	Nacho; Osvaldo	Nacho; Laura	Eduardo; Nacho	Laura; Eduardo	Daniella; Julia	Salvador; Daniella	Rafael; Ivonne	Salvador; Rafael	Daniella; Laura	Laura; Salvador	Daniella; Laura	Evicted (Day 77)			
Juan	Nacho; Niurka	Natalia; Potro	Eduardo; Potro	Eduardo; Laura	Salvador; Daniella	Daniella; Rafael	Ivonne; Osvaldo	Ivonne; Salvador	Ivonne; Laura	Laura; Ivonne	Evicted (Day 70)				
Lewis	Potro; Laura	Natalia; Potro	Potro; Laura	Eduardo; Laura; Rafael	Rafael; Julia	~~Salvador~~; ~~Rafael~~	Rafael; Salvador	Rafael; Salvador	Laura; Daniella	Evicted (Day 63)					
Rafael	Nacho; Mayeli	Brenda; Ivonne	Nacho; Lewis	Juan; Ivonne	Natalia; Juan	Osvaldo; Lewis	Osvaldo; Ivonne	~~Juan~~; ~~Nacho~~	Evicted (Day 56)						
Osvaldo	Mayeli; Laura	Natalia; Laura	Eduardo; Laura	Eduardo; Laura	Daniella; Salvador	Daniella; Laura	Salvador; Rafael	Evicted (Day 49)							
Niurka	Osvaldo; Laura	Brenda; Potro	Daniella; Julia	Salvador; Laura	Rafael; Salvador	Daniella; Salvador	Evicted (Day 42)								
Julia	Nacho; Toni	Ivonne; Nacho	Juan; Nacho	Juan; Natalia	Juan; Natalia	Evicted (Day 35)									
Eduardo	Nacho; Juan	Brenda; Nacho	Nacho; Ivonne	Natalia; Ivonne	Evicted (Day 28)										
Potro	Nacho; Osvaldo	Nacho; Lewis	Lewis; Ivonne	Evicted (Day 21)											
Brenda	Nacho; Juan	Ivonne; Natalia	Evicted (Day 14)												
Mayeli	Nacho; Juan	Evicted (Day 7)													
Notes	1	2	3, 4	5, 6, 7	8, 9	10, 11	12	13, 14	15	16	none	17	none		
Head of Household	Rafael	Eduardo	Salvador	Niurka; Toni	Lewis	Ivonne	Nacho	Toni	Salvador	Daniella	Ivonne	None			
Nominated	Nacho; Osvaldo; Juan; Toni; Mayeli; Laura	Natalia; Brenda; Nacho; Potro	Eduardo; Nacho; Lewis; Potro	Laura; Natalia; Eduardo; Juan	Rafael; Natalia; Salvador; Daniella; Juan; Julia	Daniella; Lewis; Osvaldo; Salvador; Niurka	Ivonne; Osvaldo; Rafael; Salvador	Salvador; Rafael; Daniella; Ivonne	Nacho; Laura; Ivonne; Lewis	Juan; Laura; Natalia; Salvador	Daniella; Natalia; Toni	Toni; Nacho; Daniella; Laura; Salvador	None		
Saved by HoH	Juan	Potro	Eduardo	Juan	Natalia	Osvaldo	None	Ivonne	Laura	None					
Against public vote	Osvaldo; Toni; Mayeli; Laura	Natalia; Brenda; Nacho	Nacho; Lewis; Potro	Laura; Natalia; Eduardo	Rafael; Salvador; Daniella; Juan; Julia	Daniella; Lewis; Salvador; Niurka	Ivonne; Osvaldo; Rafael; Salvador	Salvador; Rafael; Daniella	Nacho; Ivonne; Lewis	Juan; Laura; Natalia; Salvador	Daniella; Natalia; Toni	Toni; Nacho; Daniella; Laura; Salvador	Daniella; Ivonne; Nacho; Salvador; Toni	Ivonne; Nacho; Salvador; Toni	
Evicted	Mayeli; 33.7% to evict	Brenda; 53% to evict	Potro; 60% to evict	Eduardo; 54% to evict	Julia; 42% to evict	Niurka; 48% to evict	Osvaldo; 53% to evict	Rafael; 27% to save	Lewis; 18% to save	Juan; 8% to save	Natalia; 32.1% to save	Laura; 10% to save	Daniella; 8.4% to win	Toni; 14.6% to win	Nacho; 19% to win
Evicted	Mayeli; 33.7% to evict	Brenda; 53% to evict	Potro; 60% to evict	Eduardo; 54% to evict	Julia; 42% to evict	Niurka; 48% to evict	Osvaldo; 53% to evict	Rafael; 27% to save	Lewis; 18% to save	Juan; 8% to save	Natalia; 32.1% to save	Laura; 10% to save	Daniella; 8.4% to win	Salvador; 32.6% to win	
Saved	Osvaldo; 28.3% Laura; 25% Toni; 13%	Nacho; Natalia; Fewest votes	Nacho; Lewis; Fewest votes	Natalia; Laura; Fewest votes	Juan; Daniella; Rafael; Salvador; Fewest votes	Daniella; Lewis; Salvador; Fewest votes	Salvador; Rafael; Ivonne; Fewest votes	Salvador; Daniella; Most votes	Nacho; Ivonne; Most votes	Natalia; Laura; Salvador; Most votes	Toni; Daniella; Most votes	Toni; Nacho; Daniella; Salvador; Most votes	Ivonne; Nacho; Salvador; Toni; Most votes	Ivonne; 33.8% to win	

- ^Note 1 : The housemates were able to vote on which of the nominees they wanted to save. Nacho received the most votes and was saved from eviction.
- ^Note 2 : Nacho used the spontaneous nomination to give Brenda 3 nomination points and Natalia 2 points instead of the usual points of 2 and 1.
- ^Note 3 : Laura used the spontaneous nomination to give Niurka 3 points and Ivonne 2 points.
- ^Note 4 : On Day 13, Niurka was asked to open one of three envelopes each containing the name of Week 2 final nominees. The chosen envelope contained Natalia's name and she was awarded the power of voiding the nominations of any housemate. Natalia chose to void Laura's nominations.
- ^Note 5 : The HoH competition was played in teams. Niurka and Toni won the competition and became Co-Head of Households. However, only one could move in to the HoH room and Niurka won a face-off competition against Toni for the room.
- ^Note 6 : Eduardo used the spontaneous nomination to give Natalia 3 points and Ivonne 2 points.
- ^Note 7 : On Day 20, Week 3 final nominees were given a deck of cards and the housemate who picked the Joker card won the power to give 5 nomination points to three housemates. Lewis picked the Joker card and was granted the advantage to give nomination points of 2, 2, and 1 instead of the usual points of 2 and 1.
- ^Note 8 : Lewis used the spontaneous nomination to give Rafael 3 points and Julia 2 points.
- ^Note 9 : On Day 27, Week 4 final nominees rolled dice three times, the houseguest with the highest number won the power of voiding the nominations of any housemate. Natalia won and chose to void Daniella's nominations.
- ^Note 10 : Laura used the spontaneous nomination to give Osvaldo 3 points and Lewis 2 points.
- ^Note 11 : On Day 34, Week 5 final nominees rolled dice, the houseguest with the highest number won the power of voiding the nominations of any housemate. Rafael won and chose to void Lewis' nominations.
- ^Note 12 : Due to discussing about which nominee to save, Nacho did not have the power to save one of the nominees.
- ^Note 13 : Daniella, Laura, Rafael and Salvador had their nominations voided due to conspiring about nominations to rig the results, which is against the rules.
- ^Note 14 : On Day 50, it was revealed that the public would now vote on who they wanted to save from eviction and not who they wanted to get evicted. The housemate with the fewest votes will be the one to get evicted.
- ^Note 15 : On Day 55, Daniella won the power of removing three nomination points against her.
- ^Note 16 : On Day 62, Ivonne won the power of removing three nomination points against her.
- ^Note 17 : Ivonne won the final competition, winning immunity from the final eviction and granting her a place in the finale.

== Total received nominations ==
	Week 1	Week 2	Week 3	Week 4	Week 5	Week 6	Week 7	Week 8	Week 9	Week 10	Week 11	Week 12	Week 13 Final	Total
Ivonne	0	5	2	3	0	0	8	2	4	3-3	0	0	Winner	24
Salvador	0	0	0	4	6	4	6	6	0	3	3	3	Runner-up	35
Nacho	22	9	7	0	1	0	0	0	8	0	1	4	3rd Place	52
Toni	3	0	0	0	0	0	1	0	1	0	4	5	4th Place	14
Daniella	0	0	3	0	5	8	0	4	4-3	0	6	3	5th Place	30
Laura	3	2	3	13	0	1	3	1	6	6	2	3	Evicted	43
Natalia	2	14	2	9	7	0	1	0	0	6	5	Evicted		46
Juan	4	0	4	8	5	0	0	0	0	6	Evicted			27
Lewis	0	1	5	0	0	8	0	0	4	Evicted				18
Rafael	0	0	0	1	9	3	7	5	Evicted					25
Osvaldo	6	0	0	0	0	7	7	Evicted						20
Niurka	2	3	2	0	0	4	Evicted							11
Julia	0	0	1	0	5	Evicted								6
Eduardo	2	0	8	8	Evicted									18
Potro	2	6	5	Evicted										13
Brenda	2	10	Evicted											12
Mayeli	3	Evicted												3

== Episodes ==
No. overall	No. in season	Title	Original release date	U.S. viewers (millions)	Rating (18–49)
Week 1
59	1	"Noche estelar"	May 10, 2022	1.08	0.3
The 17 celebrities enter the house and the hot topic of the evening is the feud between Laura Bozzo and Niurka Marcos. The two are expected to clash immediately but end up having a civil conversation. The celebrities dine together and learn about each other.
60	2	"Los famosos al límite"	May 11, 2022	1.09	0.3
The celebrities notice Nacho isolating himself from the group; he later gets into an argument with Niurka when she criticizes his vegan lifestyle. The contestants participate in the first Head of Household competition and Rafael wins.
61	3	"En la cuerda floja"	May 12, 2022	0.79	0.2
The celebrities nominate for the first time. Julia and Rafael start to get close, which sparks comments from Nacho. The houseguests think that Nacho is jealous because he likes Julia. Brenda tells Julia that Nacho said Rafael invited Julia into the Leader's Suite because he wants to sleep with her, which upsets Julia and leads to Laura confronting Nacho. Six nominees are revealed.
62	4	"Mala vibra"	May 13, 2022	0.88	TBA
Laura threatens to leave the house after finding out she's nominated. Nacho apologizes to Julia for his comments about her and Rafael.
63	5	"Panel de lujo"	May 15, 2022	0.90	TBA
64	6	"Noche de eliminación"	May 16, 2022	1.18	0.3
Week 2
65	7	"Veneno"	May 17, 2022	1.09	0.3
66	8	"Los cañones apuntan a Nacho"	May 18, 2022	0.96	0.3
67	9	"Una fiesta imparable"	May 19, 2022	0.96	0.3
68	10	"Viernes de salvación"	May 20, 2022	1.09	0.3
69	11	"A fondo con Salvador Zerboni"	May 22, 2022	1.00	TBA
70	12	"¿Quién abandona la casa?"	May 23, 2022	1.09	0.3
Week 3
71	13	"Una sorpresiva nominación"	May 24, 2022	1.02	0.3
72	14	"Amenaza de complot"	May 25, 2022	1.16	0.3
73	15	"Una carta bajo la manga"	May 26, 2022	1.01	0.3
74	16	"Lluvia de críticas"	May 27, 2022	0.96	TBA
75	17	"El análisis de los expertos"	May 29, 2022	0.83	TBA
76	18	"Uno menos"	May 30, 2022	1.04	0.3
Week 4
77	19	"Por partida doble"	May 31, 2022	1.27	0.4
78	20	"La pipa de la paz"	June 1, 2022	1.12	0.3
79	21	"La salida"	June 2, 2022	1.15	0.3
80	22	"Reacciones inesperadas"	June 3, 2022	1.15	0.3
81	23	"La otra cara de Osvaldo Ríos"	June 5, 2022	1.00	0.3
82	24	"Un paso al costado"	June 6, 2022	1.19	0.3
Week 5
83	25	"Las ventajas de ser líder"	June 7, 2022	1.20	0.4
84	26	"Lenguas que pican"	June 8, 2022	1.02	0.3
85	27	"Sacudón en La Casa"	June 9, 2022	1.18	0.3
86	28	"Corazones rotos"	June 10, 2022	1.14	0.3
87	29	"Natalia Alcocer al descubierto"	June 12, 2022	0.95	0.2
88	30	"Una eliminación explosiva"	June 13, 2022	1.35	0.4
Week 6
89	31	"Lágrimas de amor"	June 14, 2022	1.35	0.3
90	32	"Una alianza imposible"	June 15, 2022	1.20	0.3
91	33	"Entre dramas y locuras"	June 16, 2022	1.13	0.3
92	34	"Lanzan un salvavidas"	June 17, 2022	1.10	0.3
93	35	"Al mando de La Casa"	June 19, 2022	0.97	0.3
94	36	"Nada está garantizado"	June 20, 2022	1.39	0.4
Week 7
95	37	"Niurka Marcos da sus impresiones"	June 21, 2022	1.45	0.4
96	38	"La nueva patrona"	June 22, 2022	1.42	0.4
97	39	"Todos contra todos"	June 24, 2022	1.33	0.4
98	40	"Una trama indefinida"	June 26, 2022	1.20	0.3
99	41	"Ivonne está en la mira"	June 27, 2022	1.45	0.4
Week 8
100	42	"Nueva regla"	June 28, 2022	1.19	0.3
101	43	"Tras un pacto"	June 29, 2022	1.16	0.3
102	44	"Huele a eliminación"	June 30, 2022	1.16	0.3
103	45	"La Casa se pone ardiente"	July 1, 2022	1.16	0.3
104	46	"Rivales en escena"	July 3, 2022	0.92	0.2
105	47	"Los nervios acechan"	July 4, 2022	1.22	0.3
Week 9
106	48	"Plan fallido"	July 5, 2022	1.32	0.4
107	49	"El triunfazo de Zerboni"	July 6, 2022	1.20	0.3
108	50	"Traición a la vista"	July 7, 2022	1.30	0.4
109	51	"Una chance más"	July 8, 2022	1.20	0.3
110	52	"El lado humano de Juan Vidal"	July 10, 2022	1.00	0.2
111	53	"Se caldean los ánimos"	July 11, 2022	1.27	0.3
Week 10
112	54	"Reacciones que estremecen"	July 12, 2022	1.25	0.3
113	55	"Cambios drásticos"	July 13, 2022	1.24	0.3
114	56	"Nadie quiere ser nominado"	July 14, 2022	1.29	0.3
115	57	"Con garras y dientes"	July 15, 2022	1.13	0.3
116	58	"Ivonne y su viacrucis"	July 17, 2022	1.11	0.3
117	59	"Nervios de acero"	July 18, 2022	1.37	0.4
Week 11
118	60	"La tregua"	July 19, 2022	1.25	0.3
119	61	"Juntos y revueltos"	July 20, 2022	1.08	0.3
120	62	"Miedo a perder"	July 21, 2022	1.17	0.3
121	63	"Drama por partida triple"	July 22, 2022	1.21	0.3
122	64	"Banquete agridulce"	July 24, 2022	1.07	0.2
123	65	"Cara a cara"	July 25, 2022	1.33	0.4
Week 12
124	66	"Ansiosos por ganar"	July 26, 2022	1.33	0.4
125	67	"Gloria que enfurece"	July 27, 2022	1.27	0.3
126	68	"A cruzar de los dedos"	July 28, 2022	1.25	0.3
127	69	"La guerra por la supervivencia"	July 29, 2022	1.13	0.3
128	70	"Burbujas de envidia"	July 31, 2022	1.01	0.2
129	71	"Una cena de intolerantes"	August 1, 2022	1.63	0.5
Week 13
130	72	"Hipocresía de sobra"	August 2, 2022	1.45	0.4
131	73	"La arremetida de Zerboni"	August 3, 2022	1.41	0.4
132	74	"Marejada entre cuatro"	August 4, 2022	1.30	0.3
133	75	"Sin máscaras"	August 5, 2022	1.18	0.3
134	76	"Camino a la gran final"	August 7, 2022	1.17	0.3
135	77	"Extraordinario desenlace"	August 8, 2022	1.66	0.5
