= La casa de los famosos season 4 =

2024 reality show season

La casa de los famosos
- Season 4
- Hosted by: Jimena Gallego; Nacho Lozano
- No. of days: 119
- No. of houseguests: 27
- Winner: Maripily Rivera
- Runner-up: Rodrigo Romeh
- No. of episodes: 102

Release
- Original network: Telemundo
- Original release: January 23 – May 20, 2024

Season chronology
- ← Previous; Season 3 Next → Season 5

The fourth season of the American Spanish-language reality television series La casa de los famosos premiered on January 23, 2024, with a live move-in on Telemundo. The show follows a group of celebrities living in a house together while being constantly filmed with no communication with the outside world as they compete to be the last competitor remaining to win the grand prize of $200,000. This is the first season that rewards the second and third place celebrity, who will receive $100,000 and $50,000 respectively.

The season was announced on April 11, 2023. Jimena Gallego returned as co-host of the series. Héctor Sandarti did not return as co-host and was replaced by Nacho Lozano. This season, Manelyk González returns as panelist for Sunday episodes, joined by Horacio Villalobos, and Anette Cuburu. The season concluded on May 20, 2024, after 119 days of competition with Maripily Rivera being crowned the winner, and Rodrigo Romeh the runner-up.

== Format ==
The season follows 27 celebrities living in a house together with no communication with the outside world and being constantly filmed during their time in the house. Each week, the housemates compete in the Head of Household competition, with the winner being immune from eviction. Each housemate has three nomination points to give to two housemates, giving 2 points to one housemate and 1 point to the other. The housemates with the most nomination points are put up for eviction and the HoH must save one of the nominees. A change this season is that the five housemates with the most nomination points are put up for eviction, unlike the previous season where the top four were put up for eviction. The public at home votes for the housemate they want to keep in the house, with the least voted housemate being evicted. Each week the housemates are assigned tasks in order to win their allowance for food.

=== Twists ===
==== Power to Save Competition ====
This season, the housemates have the opportunity to challenge the HoH and steal their benefit of saving one of the nominees. The houseguests first compete against each other for the right to face-off against the HoH. The winner then goes head-to-head with the HoH for the power to save.

==== Dilemmas ====
Throughout the season, housemates are presented with dilemmas where they have to choose between sacrificing themselves or punishing everyone else in the house.

== Housemates ==
Name	Age	Occupation	Day entered	Status	Ref
Maripily Rivera	46	Model & TV host	1	Winner; Day 119	
Rodrigo Romeh	34	Athlete	1	Runner-up; Day 119	
Lupillo Rivera	51	Singer-songwriter	1	3rd Place; Day 119	
Alana Lliteras	20	Chef & TV personality	1	4th Place; Day 119	
Geraldine Bazán	41	Actress	51	5th Place; Day 119	
Aleska Génesis	33	Model	1	6th Place; Day 118	
Paulo Quevedo	49	Actor	55	7th Place; Day 115	
José Reyes "La Melaza"	40	Retired MLB player	1	Evicted; Day 112	
Patricia Corcino	35	TV personality	51	Evicted; Day 105	
Cristina Porta (Note: Cristina Porta previously participated on the first season of Secret Story Spain.)	33	Sports journalist	1	Evicted; Day 98	
Clovis Nienow	30	Actor & model	1	Evicted; Day 91	
Ariadna Gutiérrez (Note: Ariadna Gutiérrez previously participated on the first season of Celebrity Big Brother USA.)	30	Supermodel & actress	1	Evicted; Day 84	
Pedro Figueira "La Divaza"	25	Influencer	1	Walked; Day 78	
Isis Serrath	33	Actress	53	Evicted; Day 77	
Silvia "La Bronca" del Valle	46	Radio host	1	Evicted; Day 70	
Alfredo Adame	65	TV host & producer	1	Evicted; Day 63	
Guty Carrera	33	TV personality	1	Evicted; Day 56	
Robbie Mora	25	TV personality	1	Evicted; Day 49	
Daniela "Bebeshita" Alexis	33	Influencer	1	Evicted; Day 42	
Sophie Durand	20	Singer & actress	1	Evicted; Day 35	
Carlos Gómez "El Cañón"	31	Athlete & TV personality	1	Ejected; Day 34	
Gregorio Pernía	53	Actor	1	Walked; Day 30	
Mariana González	40	Influencer	1	Evicted; Day 28	
Thali García	33	Actress & TV host	1	Ejected; Day 23	
Fernando Lozada	33	Reality TV star	1	Evicted; Day 21	
Leslie Gallardo	24	TV personality	1	Evicted; Day 14	
Christian Estrada	34	Reality TV star	1	Evicted; Day 7	

== Nominations table ==
Every week, each housemate nominates for two and one points, shown in descending order in the table. The five housemates with the most points face the public vote.

This housemate was the Head of Household, and could not be nominated.
This housemate was immune from eviction.
This housemate was automatically put up for eviction.

	Week 1	Week 2	Week 3	Week 4	Week 5	Week 6	Week 7	Week 8	Week 9	Week 10	Week 11	Week 12	Week 13	Week 14	Week 15	Week 16	Week 17				
	Week 1	Week 2	Week 3	Week 4	Week 5	Week 6	Week 7	Week 8	Week 9	Week 10	Week 11	Week 12	Week 13	Week 14	Week 15	Week 16	Day 115	Day 118	Finale		
Maripily	Alana; Bebeshita	Carlos; Guty	Fernando; Guty	Mariana; Alana	Sophie; Carlos	Bebeshita; Bronca	~~Alana~~; ~~Guty~~	Guty; ~~Alana~~	Lupillo; Cristina	Romeh; Ariadna; Aleska	Romeh; Alana	Patricia; Geraldine	Paulo; Alana	Lupillo; Patricia; Melaza	Geraldine; Lupillo	Alana; Lupillo; Melaza	No nominations	No nominations	Winner (Day 119)		
Romeh	Mariana; Bronca	Carlos; Guty	Carlos; Guty	Mariana; Alfredo	Carlos; Sophie	Bebeshita; Bronca	~~Guty~~; ~~Alana~~	~~Alana~~; Guty	Alfredo; Cristina	Cristina; Aleska; Bronca	Patricia	Geraldine; Patricia	Paulo; Alana	Lupillo; Patricia; Melaza	Lupillo; Geraldine	Lupillo; Melaza; Alana	No nominations	No nominations	Runner-up (Day 119)		
Lupillo	Alfredo; Thali	Leslie; Fernando	Fernando; Carlos	Alana; Mariana	Carlos; Sophie	Robbie; Bronca	Guty; Melaza	Guty; Alana	Cristina; Alfredo	Cristina; Bronca; Aleska	Serrath; Paulo	Maripily; Clovis	Romeh; Clovis	Paulo; Maripily; Cristina	Patricia; Romeh	Paulo; Geraldine; Maripily	No nominations	No nominations	Third place (Day 119)		
Alana	Christian; Clovis	Thali; Maripily	Maripily; Thali	Gregorio; Ariadna	Romeh; Clovis	Ariadna; Bronca	~~Clovis~~; ~~Lupillo~~	Romeh; Lupillo	Lupillo; Maripily	Clovis; Cristina; Lupillo	Serrath; Maripily	Romeh; Clovis	Romeh; Clovis	Cristina; Maripily; Paulo	Romeh; Paulo	Maripily; Paulo; Geraldine	No nominations	No nominations	Fourth place (Day 119)		
Geraldine	Not in House							Exempt	Exempt	Exempt	Patricia; Divaza	Romeh; Clovis	Clovis; Romeh	Patricia; Cristina; Maripily	Romeh; Patricia	Aleska; Lupillo; Maripily	No nominations	No nominations	Fifth place (Day 119)		
Aleska	Sophie; Cristina	Lupillo; Gregorio	Maripily; Thali	Romeh; Clovis	Cristina; Ariadna	Cristina; Bronca	~~Clovis~~; ~~Lupillo~~	Cristina; Lupillo	Maripily; Lupillo	Cristina; Clovis; Divaza	Lupillo; Divaza	Romeh; Ariadna	Maripily; Romeh	Patricia; Cristina; Paulo	Paulo; Patricia	Geraldine; Paulo; Maripily	No nominations	No nominations	Sixth place (Day 118)		
Paulo	Not in House							Exempt	Head of Household	Exempt	Alana; Aleska	Maripily; Ariadna	Maripily; Clovis	Aleska; Geraldine; Lupillo	Melaza; Lupillo; Aleska	Melaza; Alana; Lupillo	No nominations	Seventh place (Day 115)			
Melaza	Thali; Cristina	Clovis; Romeh	Divaza; Thali	Romeh; Clovis	Ariadna; Cristina	Divaza; Bronca	~~Lupillo~~; ~~Clovis~~	Lupillo; Romeh	Maripily; Lupillo	Cristina; Clovis; Divaza	Paulo; Maripily	Ariadna; Clovis	Romeh; Clovis	Paulo; Maripily; Cristina	Paulo; Patricia	Paulo; Maripily; Geraldine	Evicted (Day 112)				
Patricia	Not in House							Exempt	Exempt	Exempt	Aleska; Alana	Maripily; Ariadna	Maripily; Clovis	Geraldine; Maripily; Aleska	Aleska; Melaza	Evicted (Day 105)					
Cristina	Christian; Aleska	Carlos; Thali	Thali; Divaza	Gregorio; Ariadna	Aleska; Carlos	Robbie; Bronca	Alfredo; Guty	Alfredo; Bronca	Bronca; Aleska	Alana; Aleska; Melaza	Aleska; Alana	Maripily; Ariadna	Maripily; Aleska	Aleska; Geraldine; Maripily	Evicted (Day 98)						
Clovis	Carlos; Mariana	Carlos; Guty	Carlos; Fernando	Mariana; Alfredo	Carlos; Sophie	Robbie; Bronca	~~Guty~~; ~~Alana~~	Guty; ~~Alana~~	Alfredo; Cristina	Cristina; Bronca; Aleska	Paulo; Maripily	Geraldine; Patricia	Melaza; Paulo	Evicted (Day 91)							
Ariadna	Christian; Clovis	Fernando; Guty	Fernando; Guty	Alfredo; Mariana	Sophie; Carlos	Bebeshita; Bronca	~~Alana~~; ~~Guty~~	Alana; Guty	Cristina; Alfredo	Cristina; Bronca; Aleska	Serrath; Maripily	Patricia; Geraldine	Evicted (Day 84)								
Divaza	Christian; Alfredo	Leslie; Cristina	Fernando; Guty	Mariana; Alfredo	Sophie; Carlos	Robbie; Bronca	~~Alana~~; ~~Alfredo~~	Alana; Melaza	Alfredo; Cristina	Cristina; Melaza; Bronca	Maripily; Paulo	Walked (Day 78)									
Serrath	Not in House							Exempt	Exempt	Exempt	Alana; Romeh	Evicted (Day 77)									
Bronca	Thali; Romeh	Thali; Clovis	Divaza; Romeh	Ariadna; Gregorio	Romeh; Clovis	Divaza; Cristina	~~Ariadna~~; Cristina	Romeh; Divaza	Lupillo; Cristina	Ariadna; Clovis; Cristina	Evicted (Day 70)										
Alfredo	Leslie; Robbie	Cristina; Maripily	Thali; Maripily	Clovis; Romeh	Ariadna; Maripily	Divaza; Bronca	Lupillo; Clovis	Cristina; Divaza	Cristina; Divaza	Evicted (Day 63)											
Guty	Clovis; Ariadna	Clovis; Romeh	Clovis; Thali	Romeh; Clovis	Romeh; Clovis	Ariadna; Bronca	~~Lupillo~~; ~~Ariadna~~	Romeh; Lupillo	Evicted (Day 56)												
Robbie	Christian; Alfredo	Alfredo; Thali	Maripily; Divaza	Romeh; Clovis	Ariadna; Cristina	Clovis; Bronca	~~Clovis~~; ~~Ariadna~~	Evicted (Day 49)													
Bebeshita	Divaza; Christian	Thali; Gregorio	Maripily; Divaza	Gregorio; Ariadna	Romeh; Clovis	Ariadna; Bronca	Evicted (Day 42)														
Sophie	Clovis; Divaza	Gregorio; Carlos	Maripily; Divaza	Ariadna; Gregorio	Clovis; Romeh	Evicted (Day 35)															
Carlos	Romeh; Clovis	Clovis; Gregorio	Maripily; Romeh	Romeh; Clovis	Cristina; Ariadna	Ejected (Day 34)															
Gregorio	Christian; Robbie	Carlos; Guty	Carlos; Sophie	Alfredo; Bebeshita	Walked (Day 30)																
Mariana	Thali; Melaza	Thali; Carlos	Romeh; Divaza	Gregorio; Ariadna	Evicted (Day 28)																
Thali	Romeh; Bronca	Leslie; Fernando	Fernando; Carlos	Ejected (Day 23)																	
Fernando	Carlos; Sophie	Clovis; Romeh	Clovis; Divaza	Evicted (Day 21)																	
Leslie	Thali; Alfredo	Thali; Gregorio	Evicted (Day 14)																		
Christian	Carlos; Robbie	Evicted (Day 7)																			
Notes	none			1	2, 3, 4	5	6	7, 8, 9, 10	none	11	12	13	14	11	15	16, 11, 17	none				
Head of Household	Guty	Ariadna	Lupillo	Lupillo	Bebeshita; Robbie	Lupillo	Romeh	Aleska	Paulo	Maripily	Melaza	Alana	Patricia	Romeh	Maripily	None					
Nominated	Christian; Thali; Clovis; Carlos; Alfredo; Romeh	Carlos; Thali; Clovis; Gregorio; Leslie	Maripily; Fernando; Divaza; Carlos; Thali	Romeh; Gregorio; Mariana; Ariadna; Alfredo; Clovis	Carlos; Romeh; Sophie; Ariadna; Clovis; Cristina	Bronca; Robbie; Divaza; Ariadna; Bebeshita	Alana; Aleska; Alfredo; Ariadna; Clovis; Cristina; Divaza; Guty; Lupillo; Maripily; Melaza; Robbie	Guty; Alana; Cristina; Romeh; Alfredo; Bronca	Cristina; Alfredo; Lupillo; Maripily; Bronca	Cristina; Clovis; Aleska; Bronca; Ariadna	Alana; Aleska; Maripily; Paulo; Serrath; Patricia	Maripily; Ariadna; Geraldine; Patricia; Romeh	Maripily; Romeh; Clovis; Paulo; Alana	Maripily; Patricia; Cristina; Paulo; Aleska; Geraldine; Lupillo	Lupillo; Patricia; Paulo; Romeh; Melaza	Paulo; Lupillo; Maripily; Geraldine; Alana; Melaza	None				
Power to Save Holder	Guty	Lupillo	Clovis	Gregorio	Bebeshita; Robbie	Lupillo	Lupillo	Divaza	Melaza	Bronca	Melaza	Aleska	Patricia	Alana	Lupillo	Paulo	None				
Saved	Carlos	Thali	Carlos	Ariadna	Carlos	Ariadna	Lupillo	Romeh	Bronca	Aleska	Alana	Geraldine	Paulo	Geraldine	Melaza	Paulo	None				
Against public vote	Christian; Thali; Clovis; Alfredo; Romeh	Carlos; Clovis; Gregorio; Leslie	Maripily; Fernando; Divaza; Thali	Romeh; Gregorio; Mariana; Alfredo; Clovis	Romeh; Sophie; Ariadna; Clovis; Cristina	Bronca; Robbie; Divaza; Bebeshita	Alana; Aleska; Alfredo; Ariadna; Clovis; Cristina; Divaza; Guty; Maripily; Melaza; Robbie	Guty; Alana; Cristina; Alfredo; Bronca	Cristina; Alfredo; Lupillo; Maripily	Cristina; Clovis; Bronca; Ariadna	Aleska; Maripily; Paulo; Serrath; Patricia	Maripily; Ariadna; Patricia; Romeh	Maripily; Romeh; Clovis; Alana	Maripily; Patricia; Cristina; Paulo; Aleska; Lupillo	Lupillo; Patricia; Paulo; Romeh	Lupillo; Maripily; Geraldine; Alana; Melaza	Alana; Aleska; Geraldine; Lupillo; Maripily; Paulo; Romeh	Alana; Aleska; Geraldine; Lupillo; Maripily; Romeh	Alana; Geraldine; Lupillo; Maripily; Romeh		
Ejected	None			Thali	Carlos	None															
Walked	None				Gregorio	None						Divaza	None								
Evicted	Christian; Fewest votes to save	Leslie; Fewest votes to save	Fernando; Fewest votes to save	Mariana; Fewest votes to save	Sophie; Fewest votes to save	Bebeshita; Fewest votes to save	Robbie; Fewest votes to save	Guty; Fewest votes to save	Alfredo; Fewest votes to save	Bronca; Fewest votes to save	Serrath; Fewest votes to save	Ariadna; Fewest votes to save	Clovis; Fewest votes to save	Cristina; Fewest votes to save	Patricia; Fewest votes to save	Melaza; Fewest votes to save	Paulo; 7th place	Aleska; 6th place	Geraldine; 5th place	Alana; 4th place	Lupillo; 3rd place
Evicted	Christian; Fewest votes to save	Leslie; Fewest votes to save	Fernando; Fewest votes to save	Mariana; Fewest votes to save	Sophie; Fewest votes to save	Bebeshita; Fewest votes to save	Robbie; Fewest votes to save	Guty; Fewest votes to save	Alfredo; Fewest votes to save	Bronca; Fewest votes to save	Serrath; Fewest votes to save	Ariadna; Fewest votes to save	Clovis; Fewest votes to save	Cristina; Fewest votes to save	Patricia; Fewest votes to save	Melaza; Fewest votes to save	Paulo; 7th place	Aleska; 6th place	Romeh; Runner-up		
Evicted	Christian; Fewest votes to save	Leslie; Fewest votes to save	Fernando; Fewest votes to save	Mariana; Fewest votes to save	Sophie; Fewest votes to save	Bebeshita; Fewest votes to save	Robbie; Fewest votes to save	Guty; Fewest votes to save	Alfredo; Fewest votes to save	Bronca; Fewest votes to save	Serrath; Fewest votes to save	Ariadna; Fewest votes to save	Clovis; Fewest votes to save	Cristina; Fewest votes to save	Patricia; Fewest votes to save	Melaza; Fewest votes to save	Paulo; 7th place	Aleska; 6th place	Maripily; Winner		

- ^Note 1 : On Day 23, Thali decided to escape the house and was ejected for breaking the isolation rule.
- ^Note 2 : The HoH competition was played in pairs. Bebeshita and Robbie won the competition and became Co-Head of Household.
- ^Note 3 : On Day 30, Gregorio walked out of the game because he missed his family and wanted to be with them.
- ^Note 4 : On Day 34, Carlos was ejected from the game due to violent behavior towards Romeh.
- ^Note 5 : In Week 6, Bronca, Clovis and Lupillo won the power to spin a wheel to determine the amount of points given to their nominations. The results were:
  - Bronca: 3 points to Divaza and 3 points to Cristina.
  - Clovis: 3 points to Robbie and 3 points to Bronca.
  - Lupillo: 3 points to Robbie and 3 points to Bronca.
- ^Note 6 : In Week 7, several housemates conspired and announced their nominations to rig the results, which is against the rules. If a housemate nominated at least one of their announced nominees, that nomination would be voided. If they nominated both of their announced nominees, those nominations would be voided and the housemate would be automatically put up for eviction. Romeh, the HoH of the week, also participated in the conspiracy, but since he had immunity, only his points were nullified.
- ^Note 7 : On Day 51, Geraldine and Patricia entered the house as new houseguests. They were immune from nomination and eviction and were ineligible to nominate for two weeks.
- ^Note 8 : In Week 8, nomination points for the second nominated housemate were randomly determined by small safes containing the points to be given. The results were:
  - Alana: -1 point to Lupillo.
  - Aleska: 0 points to Lupillo.
  - Alfredo: 1 point to Divaza
  - Ariadna: 3 points to Guty.
  - Bronca: -3 points to Divaza.
  - Clovis: -1 point to Alana.
  - Cristina: 2 points to Bronca.
  - Divaza: 0 points to Melaza
  - Guty: -2 points to Lupillo.
  - Lupillo: 1 point to Alana.
  - Maripily 0 points to Alana
  - Melaza: -2 points to Romeh.
  - Romeh: 2 points to Guty.
- ^Note 9 : Clovis, Maripily and Romeh had their points against Alana voided due to discussing about nominating her.
- ^Note 10 : On Day 53, Serrath entered the house as a new houseguest, followed by Paulo on Day 55. They were immune from nomination and eviction and were ineligible to nominate for two weeks.
- ^Note 11 : This week each housemate had six nomination points to give to three housemates, the first receiving 3 points, the second receiving 2 points, and the third receiving a single point.
- ^Note 12 : On Day 73, Ariadna, Paulo and Romeh won special powers for the nomination ceremony. Ariadna's power was to remove three nomination points against her. Paulo's power was to duplicate his nomination points, giving 4 points to Alana and 2 points to Aleska. Romeh's power was to automatically nominate a housemate of his choice, he chose to nominate Patricia.
- ^Note 13 : On Day 78, Divaza walked out of the game because he missed his family.
- ^Note 14 : On Day 87, Geraldine and Romeh won special powers for the nomination ceremony. Geraldine's power was to remove three nomination points against her. Romeh's power was to duplicate his nomination points, giving 4 points to Paulo and 2 points to Alana.
- ^Note 15 : On Day 101, Paulo won the power to give out six nomination points to three housemates, the first receiving 3 points, the second receiving 2 points, and the third receiving a single point.
- ^Note 16 : On Day 106, Romeh won the final competition, winning immunity from the final eviction and granting him a place in the finale.
- ^Note 17 : In the final Power to Save competition, the six nominees competed against each other to save themselves from elimination and become a finalist.

== Total received nominations ==
	Week 1	Week 2	Week 3	Week 4	Week 5	Week 6	Week 7	Week 8	Week 9	Week 10	Week 11	Week 12	Week 13	Week 14	Week 15	Week 16	Week 17 Final	Total
Maripily	0	2	13	0	1	0	0	0	5	0	6	8	8	10	0	8	Winner	61
Romeh	5	3	4	11	9	0	0	4	0	3	3	6	8	0	5	0	Runner-up	61
Lupillo	0	2	0	0	0	0	2	-1	8	1	2	0	0	7	5	8	3rd Place	35
Alana	2	0	0	3	0	0	0	5	0	3	9	0	3	0	0	6	4th Place	31
Geraldine	Not in House							0	0	0	0	6	-3	7	3	7	5th Place	23
Aleska	1	0	0	0	2	0	0	0	1	8	6	0	1	7	3	3	6th Place	32
Paulo	Not in House							0	0	0	6	0	7	8	5	10	7th Place	36
Melaza	1	0	0	0	0	0	1	0	0	3	0	0	2	2	4	6	Evicted	19
Patricia	Not in House							0	0	0	2	6	0	10	5	Evicted		23
Cristina	2	3	0	0	6	5	1	4	11	24	0	0	0	9	Evicted			65
Clovis	7	9	4	7	6	2	1	0	0	9	0	4	7	Evicted				56
Ariadna	1	0	0	8	8	6	0	0	0	5	-3	6	Evicted					34
Divaza	3	0	10	0	0	7	0	-2	1	2	2	Walked						25
Serrath	Not in House							0	0	0	6	Evicted						6
Bronca	2	0	0	0	0	18	0	2	2	8	Evicted							32
Alfredo	5	2	0	7	0	0	2	2	8	Evicted								26
Guty	0	5	4	0	0	0	3	11	Evicted									23
Robbie	3	0	0	0	0	10	0	Evicted										13
Bebeshita	1	0	0	1	0	6	Evicted											8
Sophie	3	0	1	0	9	Evicted												13
Carlos	6	12	8	0	10	Ejected												36
Gregorio	0	6	0	10	Walked													16
Mariana	3	0	0	10	Evicted													13
Thali	9	12	8	Ejected														29
Fernando	0	4	11	Evicted														15
Leslie	2	6	Evicted															8
Christian	13	Evicted																13

== Episodes ==
No. overall	No. in season	Title	Original release date	U.S. viewers (millions)	Rating (18–49)
Week 1
220	1	"Bienvenidos"	January 23, 2024	1.28 (Note: The ratings of this episode were split between the first hour and last two hours. The viewership data is a combined average of the ratings, with 1.26 million total viewers for the first hour and 1.30 million total viewers for the last two hours.)	0.3
221	2	"Retos y disyuntivas"	January 24, 2024	1.24	0.3
222	3	"Hora de hacer limpieza"	January 25, 2024	1.17	0.3
223	4	"Solo uno puede salvarse"	January 26, 2024	1.03	0.2
224	5	"No todo es color de rosa"	January 28, 2024	0.93	0.2
225	6	"Tensión en La Casa"	January 29, 2024	1.25	0.3
Week 2
226	7	"Adiós mi galán"	January 30, 2024	1.28	0.3
227	8	"Duchas en peligro"	January 31, 2024	1.10	0.3
228	9	"Crece la discordia"	February 1, 2024	1.18	0.2
229	10	"Quién llega más cerca"	February 2, 2024	1.26	0.3
230	11	"Candidatos al despido"	February 4, 2024	1.17	0.3
231	12	"Conmoción"	February 5, 2024	1.38	0.3
Week 3
232	13	"Jornada electrizante"	February 6, 2024	1.24	0.3
233	14	"El campo de batalla"	February 7, 2024	1.42	0.3
234	15	"Tensa calma"	February 8, 2024	1.32	0.3
235	16	"En defensa de los nuestros"	February 9, 2024	1.13	0.3
236	17	"El palacio de la hipocresía"	February 11, 2024	0.99	0.2
237	18	"Imperio en jaque"	February 12, 2024	1.44	0.3
Week 4
238	19	"De amores y despedidas"	February 13, 2024	1.31 (Note: The ratings of this episode were split between the first hour and last two hours. The viewership data is a combined average of the ratings, with 1.21 million total viewers for the first hour and 1.41 million total viewers for the last two hours.)	0.3
239	20	"Sentimientos alterados"	February 14, 2024	1.34	0.3
240	21	"El gran escape"	February 15, 2024	1.32	0.3
241	22	"Reacciones al veneno"	February 16, 2024	1.25	0.3
242	23	"Cupido busca la paz"	February 18, 2024	1.17	0.3
243	24	"Punto y aparte"	February 19, 2024	1.32	0.3
Week 5
244	25	"Guerra de titanes"	February 20, 2024	1.32	0.3
245	26	"Fuagua toma el poder"	February 21, 2024	1.30	0.3
246	27	"Abandono necesario"	February 22, 2024	1.21	0.3
247	28	"Convivencia en ebullición"	February 23, 2024	1.17	0.3
248	29	"Una habitante independiente"	February 25, 2024	1.26	0.3
249	30	"Y la cuerda se rompe"	February 26, 2024	1.51	0.4
Week 6
250	31	"Quejas por doquier"	February 27, 2024	1.38	0.3
251	32	"A la vista de todos"	February 28, 2024	1.31	0.3
252	33	"Decisiones por azar"	February 29, 2024	1.39	0.4
253	34	"Sálvese quien pueda"	March 1, 2024	1.40	0.4
254	35	"Posicionamiento rudo"	March 3, 2024	1.40	0.3
255	36	"La desafiante decisión de Lupillo"	March 4, 2024	1.39	0.3
Week 7
256	37	"Del desconcierto a la celebración"	March 5, 2024	1.30	0.3
257	38	"Jornada de sorpresas"	March 6, 2024	1.28	0.3
258	39	"Futuro incierto"	March 7, 2024	1.38	0.3
259	40	"Todos contra todos"	March 8, 2024	1.24	0.3
260	41	"Vacío de liderazgo"	March 10, 2024	1.13	0.3
261	42	"A merced de la audiencia"	March 11, 2024	1.46	0.3
Week 8
262	43	"Traslado perturbador"	March 12, 2024	1.32	0.3
263	44	"A la expectativa"	March 13, 2024	1.31	0.3
264	45	"Nuevas vibras"	March 14, 2024	1.31	0.3
265	46	"A la conquista"	March 15, 2024	1.23	0.3
266	47	"Sin careta"	March 17, 2024	1.13	0.2
267	48	"A preparar la maleta"	March 18, 2024	1.44	0.3
Week 9
268	49	"Sacudido"	March 19, 2024	1.26	0.3
269	50	"El encantador de serpientes"	March 20, 2024	1.19	0.3
270	51	"Se desata el huracán"	March 21, 2024	1.40	0.3
271	52	"Una jugada no tan maestra"	March 22, 2024	1.25	0.3
272	53	"Los recién llegados son el blanco"	March 24, 2024	1.25	0.3
273	54	"Víctimas de la incertidumbre"	March 25, 2024	1.45	0.4
Week 10
274	55	"Una sacudida insospechada"	March 26, 2024	1.31	0.3
275	56	"El Huracán Boricua sube de categoría"	March 27, 2024	1.32	0.3
276	57	"Sobresaltos, ocurrencias y lágrimas"	March 28, 2024	1.33	0.3
277	58	"La malquerida"	March 29, 2024	1.12	0.2
278	59	"La Casa se reorganiza"	March 31, 2024	1.19	0.2
279	60	"Dardos envenenados"	April 1, 2024	1.32	0.3
Week 11
280	61	"Malas energías"	April 2, 2024	1.24	0.2
281	62	"Juntos, pero no revueltos"	April 3, 2024	1.28	0.3
282	63	"A la caza del tesoro"	April 4, 2024	1.29	0.3
283	64	"A buen entendedor, pocas palabras"	April 5, 2024	1.19	0.2
284	65	"Se les rompió el amor"	April 7, 2024	1.18	0.2
285	66	"Inundación masiva"	April 8, 2024	1.51	0.4
Week 12
286	67	"Una doble partida"	April 9, 2024	1.37	0.3
287	68	"Las cosas cambian"	April 10, 2024	1.28	0.3
288	69	"El Tsunami"	April 11, 2024	1.47	0.3
289	70	"La cosa se pone difícil"	April 12, 2024	1.22	0.2
290	71	"Una mente enfocada"	April 14, 2024	1.43	0.3
291	72	"En el ojo de la tormenta"	April 15, 2024	1.51	0.4
Week 13
292	73	"Corazones rotos"	April 16, 2024	1.47	0.3
293	74	"Cambios de actitud"	April 17, 2024	1.27	0.3
294	75	"Alianzas en la cuerda floja"	April 18, 2024	1.30	0.3
295	76	"Con los nervios de punta"	April 19, 2024	1.30	0.3
296	77	"Se cierra el círculo"	April 21, 2024	1.20	TBA
297	78	"Con un pie en Agua y otro en Tierra"	April 22, 2024	1.43	0.3
Week 14
298	79	"Vulnerables"	April 23, 2024	1.28	0.3
299	80	"No todo está perdido"	April 24, 2024	1.21	0.3
300	81	"Sin garantías"	April 25, 2024	1.38	0.3
301	82	"Vencer para sobrevivir"	April 26, 2024	1.26	0.3
302	83	"Banderas blancas"	April 28, 2024	1.20	0.2
303	84	"¿Quién será el eliminado?"	April 29, 2024	1.51	0.3
Week 15
304	85	"Separaciones dolorosas"	April 30, 2024	1.22	0.3
305	86	"Jugadas peligrosas"	May 1, 2024	1.41	0.3
306	87	"La caída de un gigante"	May 2, 2024	1.34	0.3
307	88	"Error de cálculo"	May 3, 2024	1.34	0.3
308	89	"Sucesos inesperados"	May 5, 2024	1.32	0.3
309	90	"En suspenso"	May 6, 2024	1.48	0.3
Week 16
310	91	"Doble cara"	May 7, 2024	1.49	0.3
311	92	"Bien ganado"	May 8, 2024	1.37	0.3
312	93	"Votos y esperanzas"	May 9, 2024	1.44	0.3
313	94	"Y en la recta final, Agua fluye"	May 10, 2024	1.30	0.3
314	95	"Cuenta regresiva"	May 12, 2024	1.10	0.2
315	96	"Reina la tensión"	May 13, 2024	1.59	0.4
Week 17
316	97	"Todos en campaña"	May 14, 2024	1.40	0.3
317	98	"Buena vibra"	May 15, 2024	1.34	0.3
318	99	"Señales que hablan"	May 16, 2024	1.43	0.3
319	100	"Uno menos"	May 17, 2024	1.32	0.3
320	101	"A un paso de la victoria"	May 19, 2024	1.48	0.3
321	102	"Llega el gran día"	May 20, 2024	1.94	0.4
