= La Venganza de los Ex =

Mexican MTV reality show

- Genre: Reality
- Created by: MTV
- Country of origin: Mexico
- Original language: Spanish
- No. of series: 1
- No. of episodes: 12

Production
- Running time: 50 minutes (excluding adverts)

Original release
- Network: MTV
- Release: 21 August – 30 October 2018

Related
- La Venganza de los Ex VIP; Ex on the Beach; Acapulco Shore; Are You the One? El Match Perfecto

La Venganza de los Ex is a Mexican reality series that airs on MTV. The series premiered on August 21, 2018. It features eight single men and women enjoying a summer vacation in paradise as they search for love. However, their exes joined them to turn things around. Each ex was there for a painful revenge or to rekindle their love.

== Seasons ==
=== Season 1 (2018) ===
The first season of La Venganza de los Ex was announced by MTV Latin America in June 2018. It was confirmed that the show will take place in Tulum, Mexico. The official list of cast members was confirmed with a promotion and includes four guys singles: Oscar Plascencia, Ernesto Leal who appeared on the Mexican reality show Mitad y Mitad, Alejandro Martín, and Big Brother México star Luis Carlos Sánchez; as well as four single women: Renata Aragón, Norma Atúnez, Gina Segura and Monserrath Ávila. The show premiered on August 21, 2018. It was also confirmed that the cast members of Acapulco Shore, Brenda Zambrano and Gabriela Ruíz, as well as Dianey Sahagún, who participated in the second season of Are You the One? El Match Perfecto, will participate in the series as ex.

- **Bold** indicates original cast member; all other cast were brought into the series as an ex.

Episodes	Name	Age (Note: Age when first appearing on the show.)	Hometown	Exes
12	**Alejandro "Alex" Martín**	22	Guadalajara	Rocio Sanchez
12	**Ernesto Leal**	32	Monterrey	Brenda Zambrano
12	**Gina Segura**	28	Monterrey	Jorge Guzman
12	**Luis "Sargento" Sánchez**	27	Monterrey	Dianey Sahagun, Itzy Milan
12	**Monserrath "Monse" Ávila**	21	Mexico City	Spencer León
12	**Norma Antúnez**	22	Guadalajara	Pedro Castro
12	**Oscar Plascencia**	22	Guadalajara	Gabriela Ruiz
12	**Renata Aragón**	22	Querétaro	Elias Athie
12	Elias Athie	21	Mexico City	Renata Aragón
10	Brenda Zambrano	25	Monterrey	Ernesto Leal, Johnatan Gutierrez
10	Spencer León	32	Florida	Monserrath Ávila
9	Rocío Sánchez	20	Pto. Vallarta	Alejandro Martín
8	Dianey Sahagun	22	Guadalajara	Luis Sánchez, Jorge Guzman
5	Jorge Guzman	29	Guadalajara	Gina Segura, Dianey Sahagun
5	Johnatan "John" Gutierrez	33	Monterrey	Brenda Zambrano
5	Gabriela "Gaby" Ruiz	28	Guadalajara	Oscar Plascencia, Daniel Pinkus
4	Daniel Pinkus	27	Mexico City	Gabriela Ruiz
3	Pedro Castro	25	Guadalajara	Norma Antúnez
2	Itzy Milan	23	Mexico City	Luis Sánchez

==== Duration of cast ====
Cast member	Episodes											
Cast member	1	2	3	4	5	6	7	8	9	10	11	12
Alex												
Ernesto												
Gina												
Monse												
Norma												
Oscar												
Renata												
Sargento												
Elias												
Brenda												
Spencer												
Rocio												
Dianey												
Jorge												
John												
Gaby												
Pinkus												
Pedro												
Itzy												

Key: = "Cast member" is featured in this episode
Key: = "Cast member" arrives on the beach
Key: = "Cast member" has an ex arrive on the beach
Key: = "Cast member" arrives on the beach and has an ex arrive during the same episode
Key: = "Cast member" leaves the beach
Key: = "Cast member" does not feature in this episode
