= La casa de los famosos season 5 =

Reality show season

La casa de los famosos: All-Stars
- Season 5
- Hosted by: Jimena Gallego; Javier Poza
- No. of days: 119
- No. of houseguests: 23
- Winner: Carlos "Caramelo" Cruz
- Runner-up: Luca Onestini
- No. of episodes: 102

Release
- Original network: Telemundo
- Original release: February 4 – June 2, 2025

Season chronology
- ← Previous; Season 4 Next → Season 6

The fifth season of the American Spanish-language reality television series La casa de los famosos, also known as La casa de los famosos: All-Stars, premiered on February 4, 2025, with a live move-in on Telemundo. The show follows a group of celebrities as they compete to be the last competitor remaining to win the grand prize of $200,000, with the second and third place celebrity receiving $100,000 and $50,000 respectively.

The season was announced on May 9, 2024. A few days later, it was revealed that the season would be an All-Star season, featuring housemates from previous seasons. During the season premiere, it was revealed that the season would also feature eight new housemates, known as "New Generation" housemates. Jimena Gallego returned as co-host of the series. Nacho Lozano did not return as co-host and is replaced by Javier Poza. This season, Alicia Machado, Maripily Rivera and Sergio Mayer serve as panelists for Sunday episodes. The season concluded on June 2, 2025, after 119 days of competition with Carlos "Caramelo" Cruz being crowned the winner, and Luca Onestini the runner-up.

== Format ==
The season follows new and former housemates living together in a house with no communication with the outside world as they are constantly filmed during their stay in the house. Each week, the housemates must complete assigned tasks to earn their food allowance for the week. At the start of the week, they housemates in the Head of Household competition, with the winner being immune from eviction. Each housemate has three nomination points to give to two housemates, giving 2 points to one housemate and 1 point to the other. The housemates with the most nomination points are put up for eviction and can be saved by the winner of the Power to Save competition. The public votes for the housemate they want to keep in the house and the one with the least votes is evicted.

=== Twists ===
==== Positive Nomination ====
In Week 8, the housemates nominated for who they wanted to remain in the house and be saved from eviction. The five housemates with the least points faced the public vote.

==== Temptation Box ====
Starting in Week 9, the houseguests were offered the Temptation Box, which gave them the opportunity to reunite with a family member in exchange for nominating a housemate from their bedroom or themselves.

== Housemates ==
The housemates were revealed during the move-in premiere.

Name	Age	Occupation	Status	Ref
Carlos "Caramelo" Cruz	34	Influencer	Winner; Day 119	
Luca Onestini (Note: Luca Onestini previously participated on the second and seventh season of Grande Fratello VIP, first season of Secret Story Spain and second season of Gran Hermano Dúo.)	32	Influencer & reality TV star	Runner-up; Day 119	
Rey Grupero La casa de los famosos 3	37	Influencer	3rd Place; Day 119	
Rosa Caiafa	34	Athlete	4th Place; Day 119	
Paulo Quevedo La casa de los famosos 4	50	Actor	5th Place; Day 119	
Dania Méndez La casa de los famosos 3	32	Influencer & reality TV star	6th Place; Day 115	
Alfredo Adame La casa de los famosos 4	66	TV host & producer	Evicted; Day 112	
Niurka Marcos La casa de los famosos 2	57	Actress & TV personality	Evicted; Day 105	
Manelyk González La casa de los famosos 1	36	Reality TV star	Evicted; Day 98	
Patricia "Paty" Navidad La casa de los famosos 3	51	Actress & singer	Evicted; Day 91	
Lupillo Rivera La casa de los famosos 4	53	Singer-songwriter	Walked; Day 86	
Diego Soldano La casa de los famosos 3	56	Actor	Evicted; Day 84	
Carlos Chávez	34	Athlete	Evicted; Day 77	
Uriel del Toro La casa de los famosos 1	46	Actor & model	Evicted; Day 70	
Alejandra Tijerina	30	Model	Evicted; Day 63	
Laura Bozzo La casa de los famosos 2	73	Talk show host	Evicted; Day 56	
Julia Gama La casa de los famosos 2	31	Model & actress	Evicted; Day 49	
Erubey de Anda	32	Influencer & singer	Evicted; Day 42	
Aleska Génesis La casa de los famosos 4	33	Model	Evicted; Day 35	
Ignacio "Nacho" Casano La casa de los famosos 2	44	Actor	Evicted; Day 28	
Alvaro "Varo" Vargas	34	Model & actor	Evicted; Day 21	
Valentina Valderrama	28	Model and TV host	Evicted; Day 14	
Salvador Zerboni La casa de los famosos 2	45	Actor	Evicted; Day 7	

=== Housemate exchange ===
On April 7, 2025, a housemate exchange with La casa de los famosos Colombia was announced. Manelyk was swapped with Melissa Gate from La casa de los famosos Colombia 2 on Day 64, and returned to the house on Day 69.

== Nominations table ==
Every week, each housemate nominates for two and one points, shown in descending order in the table. On some occasions, housemates may nominate a third housemate for three points. The five housemates with the most points face the public vote.

This housemate was the Head of Household, and could not be nominated.
This housemate was immune from eviction.
This housemate was automatically put up for eviction.
This housemate was not eligible to nominate.
Positive Nomination

	Week 1	Week 2	Week 3	Week 4	Week 5	Week 6	Week 7	Week 8	Week 9	Week 10	Week 11	Week 12	Week 13	Week 14	Week 15	Week 16	Week 17			
	Week 1	Week 2	Week 3	Week 4	Week 5	Week 6	Week 7	Week 8	Week 9	Week 10	Week 11	Week 12	Week 13	Week 14	Week 15	Week 16	Day 115	Finale		
Caramelo	Julia; Paty	~~Varo~~; Nacho	Carlos; Nacho; Diego; Varo	~~Paulo~~; ~~Julia~~	Lupillo; Luca; Erubey	Erubey; Luca; Lupillo	Luca; Lupillo; Carlos	Rey; Niurka	Dania; Paty; Diego	Rosa; Diego; Uriel	Carlos; Caramelo; Rosa; Diego	Paulo; Rosa; Diego	Luca; Rosa; Dania	Paulo; Rosa; Dania	Rosa; Luca; Paulo	Rosa; Paulo	No nominations	Winner (Day 119)		
Luca	Alejandra; Nacho	Nacho; ~~Varo~~	~~Carlos~~; Diego	Rey; Niurka	Uriel; Paty; Alfredo	Manelyk; Alfredo; Uriel	Caramelo; Rey; Dania	Not eligible	Niurka; Alejandra; Rey	Caramelo; Niurka; Rey	Niurka; Caramelo; Rey	Alfredo; Luca; Rey; Niurka	Manelyk; Dania; Caramelo	Alfredo; Manelyk; Rey	Rey; Alfredo; Dania	Alfredo; Caramelo	No nominations	Runner-up (Day 119)		
Rey	Nacho; ~~Rosa~~	~~Varo~~; Nacho	Diego; Carlos	~~Paulo~~; ~~Julia~~	Luca; Lupillo; Julia	Erubey; Rosa; Lupillo	Carlos; Julia; Luca	Niurka; Manelyk	Dania; Paty; Diego	Rosa; Uriel; Paty	Niurka; Caramelo; Diego	Paulo; Rosa; Diego	Rosa; Luca; Dania	Paulo; Rosa; Dania	Paulo; Luca; Rosa	Rosa; Luca	No nominations	Third place (Day 119)		
Rosa	Rey; Caramelo	Erubey; Alejandra	Niurka; Alejandra	~~Alejandra~~; ~~Manelyk~~	Paty; Caramelo; Dania	Manelyk; Uriel; Alfredo	Rey; Dania; Caramelo	Carlos; Laura	Manelyk; Caramelo; Niurka	Manelyk; Rey; Caramelo	Alfredo; Caramelo; Rey	Niurka; Rey; Alfredo	Alfredo; Rey; Niurka	Paulo; Dania; Niurka	Rey; Alfredo; Dania	Caramelo; Rey	No nominations	Fourth place (Day 119)		
Paulo	Alfredo; Manelyk	Nacho; ~~Varo~~	Carlos; Diego	~~Rey~~; ~~Niurka~~	Caramelo; Alfredo; Rey	Alfredo; Manelyk; Rey	Caramelo; Dania; Alejandra	Rosa; Carlos	Niurka; Rey; Manelyk	Caramelo; Rey; Manelyk	Niurka; Rey; Caramelo	Alfredo; Rey; Niurka	Paty; Caramelo; Dania	Caramelo; Rey; Manelyk	Alfredo; Dania; Rey	Alfredo; Caramelo	No nominations	Fifth place (Day 119)		
Dania	~~Varo~~; Nacho	~~Rosa~~; Valentina	Rosa; Varo	Niurka; Rey	Luca; Aleska; Erubey	Luca; Diego; Erubey	Carlos; Lupillo; Diego	Paty; Uriel	Alejandra; Niurka; Rey	Manelyk; Niurka; Rey	Niurka; Caramelo; Rey	Diego; Rosa; Caramelo	Rosa; Luca; Niurka	Paulo; Rosa; Manelyk	Paulo; Rey; Luca	Rosa; Luca	No nominations	Sixth place (Day 115)		
Alfredo	Paulo; Aleska	Valentina; ~~Rosa~~	Nacho; Carlos	Paulo; Rosa	Luca; Lupillo; Erubey	Lupillo; Luca; Paulo	Lupillo; Luca; Carlos	Uriel; Paty	Niurka; Alejandra; Paty; Manelyk	Caramelo; Rey; Manelyk	Rosa; Carlos; Diego	Diego; Paulo; Rosa	Rosa; Luca; Dania	Paulo; Rosa; Niurka	Paulo; Luca; Rosa	Luca; Paulo	Evicted (Day 112)			
Niurka	Salvador; Uriel	~~Varo~~; Nacho	Diego; Carlos	~~Paulo~~; ~~Julia~~	Aleska; Erubey; Lupillo	Laura; Rosa; Dania	Dania; Paty; Julia	Rey; Manelyk	Paty; Dania; Diego	Uriel; Dania; Niurka; Rosa	Rosa; Carlos; Diego	Paulo; Rosa; Diego	Rosa; Luca; Dania	Manelyk; Dania; Alfredo	Rey; Rosa; Luca	Evicted (Day 105)				
Manelyk	Alejandra; Paulo	~~Rosa~~; Valentina	Varo; Rosa	~~Julia~~; ~~Nacho~~	Not eligible	Rosa; Lupillo; Diego	Carlos; Julia; Diego	Alejandra; Rey	Paty; Dania; Diego	Uriel; Rosa; Diego	Carlos; Rosa; Diego	Diego; Rosa; Paulo	Luca; Rosa; Dania	Paulo; Rosa; Dania	Evicted (Day 98)					
Paty	~~Varo~~; Caramelo	Valentina; Paulo	Nacho; Rosa; Varo	Julia; Nacho	Luca; Aleska; Paulo	Luca; Erubey; Lupillo	Diego; Carlos; Lupillo	Uriel; Dania	Niurka; Alejandra; Rey	Manelyk; Niurka; Rey	Niurka; Caramelo; Rey	Diego; Rosa; Caramelo	Luca; Rosa; Dania	Evicted (Day 91)						
Lupillo	Salvador; Alfredo	Nacho; ~~Varo~~	Rosa; Carlos; Diego	~~Rey~~; ~~Niurka~~	Niurka; Dania; Rey	Alfredo; Manelyk; Uriel	Dania; Rey; Uriel	Paulo; Luca	Niurka; Diego; Rey; Alejandra	~~Caramelo~~; ~~Niurka~~; ~~Rey~~	Rey; Caramelo; Niurka	Alfredo; Rey; Niurka	Walked (Day 86)							
Diego	Salvador; Alfredo	Luca; Alejandra	Lupillo; Alejandra	~~Manelyk~~; ~~Alejandra~~	Uriel; Caramelo; Alfredo	Alejandra; Manelyk; Alfredo	Rey; Dania; Alejandra	Rosa; Carlos	Rey; Alejandra; Niurka	Rey; Diego; Niurka; Caramelo	Alfredo; Niurka; Rey	Niurka; Rey; Alfredo	Evicted (Day 84)							
Carlos	Salvador; Manelyk	Luca; Erubey	Lupillo; Alejandra	~~Manelyk~~; ~~Alejandra~~	Luca; Lupillo; Caramelo	Caramelo; Manelyk; Alejandra	Rey; Dania; Alejandra	Rosa; Diego	Niurka; Alejandra; Rey	Caramelo; Niurka; Rey	Alfredo; Rey; Caramelo	Evicted (Day 77)								
Uriel	Paulo; Aleska	Valentina; ~~Rosa~~	Rosa; Varo	Julia; Nacho	Julia; Aleska; Luca	Luca; Lupillo; Erubey	Diego; Luca; Carlos	Alfredo; Dania	Niurka; Alejandra; Rey	Manelyk; Niurka; Rey	Evicted (Day 70)									
Alejandra	Paulo; Aleska	~~Rosa~~; Valentina	Varo; Rosa	~~Nacho~~; ~~Julia~~	Lupillo; Julia; Aleska	Rosa; Luca; Lupillo	Julia; Rosa; Carlos	Rey; Manelyk	Dania; Paty; Diego	Evicted (Day 63)										
Laura	Alejandra; Erubey	Alejandra; Erubey	Niurka; Alejandra; Alfredo; Nacho; Rey	Niurka; Alejandra	Alfredo; Luca; Uriel	Alfredo; Alejandra; Uriel	Caramelo; Rey; Dania	Lupillo; Luca	Evicted (Day 56)											
Julia	Alejandra; Uriel	Alejandra; Erubey	Niurka; Alejandra	Alejandra; ~~Manelyk~~	Rey; Alejandra; Uriel	Alejandra; Uriel; Rey	Rey; Dania; Alejandra	Evicted (Day 49)												
Erubey	Uriel; Laura	~~Varo~~; Nacho	Diego; Carlos	~~Niurka~~; ~~Rey~~	Caramelo; Alfredo; Uriel	Dania; Manelyk; Niurka	Evicted (Day 42)													
Aleska	Alfredo; Luca	Luca; Alejandra	Niurka; Alejandra; Nacho	~~Alejandra~~; Niurka	Paty; Uriel; Alfredo	Evicted (Day 35)														
Nacho	Manelyk; Uriel	Luca; Erubey	~~Lupillo~~; ~~Alejandra~~	~~Manelyk~~; ~~Alejandra~~	Evicted (Day 28)															
Varo	Luca; Caramelo	Luca; Erubey	Lupillo; Alejandra	Evicted (Day 21)																
Valentina	Caramelo; Uriel	Alejandra; Erubey	Evicted (Day 14)																	
Salvador	Aleska; Paulo	Evicted (Day 7)																		
Notes	1	1, 2	3	4	5	6	none	7, 8	9, 10	11, 12	13, 14, 15	16, 17	18	none	19, 20	21	none			
Head of Household	Carlos	Alejandra; Carlos	Julia	Alfredo	Manelyk	Carlos; Julia	Paulo	Caramelo	Rosa	Carlos	Luca	Dania	Paulo	Luca	~~Rosa~~; Caramelo	None				
Nominated	Alejandra; Paulo; Salvador; Alfredo; Uriel	Luca; Nacho; Alejandra; Valentina; Erubey	Diego; Carlos; Rosa; Niurka; Varo	Niurka; Julia; Alejandra; Rey; Nacho; Paulo	Luca; Lupillo; Uriel; Aleska; Caramelo; Paty	Manelyk; Luca; Alfredo; Lupillo; Erubey; Rosa	Rey; Carlos; Dania; Caramelo; Diego; Julia; Luca; Lupillo	Laura; Alfredo; Alejandra; Dania; Diego; Luca; Lupillo; Paulo	Niurka; Alejandra; Paty; Rey; Dania	Caramelo; Rey; Manelyk; Niurka; Rosa; Uriel	Niurka; Rey; Caramelo; Carlos; Rosa; Manelyk; Paulo	Diego; Rosa; Paulo; Alfredo; Rey	Rosa; Luca; Dania; Alfredo; Caramelo; Manelyk; Paty	Paulo; Rosa; Dania; Manelyk; Alfredo	Rey; Paulo; Luca; Alfredo; Rosa; Niurka	Rosa; Alfredo; Caramelo; Luca	None			
Power to Save Holder	Aleska	Uriel	Caramelo	Rosa	Dania	Julia	Carlos	Dania	Lupillo	Carlos	Lupillo	Diego	Paulo	Luca	Caramelo	Rosa	None			
Saved	Alejandra	Alejandra	Niurka	Julia	Uriel	Rosa	Carlos	Dania	Dania	Rosa	Paulo	Rosa	Luca	Paulo	Rey	Rosa	None			
Against public vote	Paulo; Salvador; Alfredo; Uriel	Luca; Nacho; Valentina; Erubey	Diego; Carlos; Rosa; Varo	Niurka; Alejandra; Rey; Nacho; Paulo	Luca; Lupillo; Aleska; Caramelo; Paty	Manelyk; Luca; Alfredo; Lupillo; Erubey	Rey; Dania; Caramelo; Diego; Julia; Luca; Lupillo	Laura; Alfredo; Alejandra; Diego; Luca; Lupillo; Paulo	Niurka; Alejandra; Paty; Rey	Caramelo; Rey; Manelyk; Niurka; Uriel	Niurka; Rey; Caramelo; Carlos; Rosa; Manelyk	Diego; Paulo; Alfredo; Rey	Rosa; Dania; Alfredo; Caramelo; Manelyk; Paty	Rosa; Dania; Manelyk; Alfredo	Paulo; Luca; Alfredo; Rosa; Niurka	Alfredo; Caramelo; Luca	Caramelo; Dania; Luca; Paulo; Rey; Rosa	Caramelo; Luca; Paulo; Rey; Rosa		
Walked	None												Lupillo	None						
Evicted	Salvador; Fewest votes to save	Valentina; Fewest votes to save	Varo; Fewest votes to save	Nacho; Fewest votes to save	Aleska; Fewest votes to save	Erubey; Fewest votes to save	Julia; Fewest votes to save	Laura; Fewest votes to save	Alejandra; Fewest votes to save	Uriel; Fewest votes to save	Carlos; Fewest votes to save	Diego; Fewest votes to save	Paty; Fewest votes to save	Manelyk; Fewest votes to save	Niurka; Fewest votes to save	Alfredo; Fewest votes to save	Dania; 6th place	Paulo; 5th place	Rosa; 4th place	Rey; 3rd place
Evicted	Salvador; Fewest votes to save	Valentina; Fewest votes to save	Varo; Fewest votes to save	Nacho; Fewest votes to save	Aleska; Fewest votes to save	Erubey; Fewest votes to save	Julia; Fewest votes to save	Laura; Fewest votes to save	Alejandra; Fewest votes to save	Uriel; Fewest votes to save	Carlos; Fewest votes to save	Diego; Fewest votes to save	Paty; Fewest votes to save	Manelyk; Fewest votes to save	Niurka; Fewest votes to save	Alfredo; Fewest votes to save	Dania; 6th place	Luca; Runner-up		
Evicted	Salvador; Fewest votes to save	Valentina; Fewest votes to save	Varo; Fewest votes to save	Nacho; Fewest votes to save	Aleska; Fewest votes to save	Erubey; Fewest votes to save	Julia; Fewest votes to save	Laura; Fewest votes to save	Alejandra; Fewest votes to save	Uriel; Fewest votes to save	Carlos; Fewest votes to save	Diego; Fewest votes to save	Paty; Fewest votes to save	Manelyk; Fewest votes to save	Niurka; Fewest votes to save	Alfredo; Fewest votes to save	Dania; 6th place	Caramelo; Winner		

- ^Note 1 : As they were not chosen to sleep in a bedroom by the Room Captains, Rosa and Varo received secret immunity for two weeks.
- ^Note 2 : The HoH competition was played in pairs. Alejandra and Carlos won the competition and became Co-Head of Household. However, only one could receive immunity and Carlos won a face-off competition for it.
- ^Note 3 : In Week 3, each housemate randomly chose a piggy bank containing an advantage or disadvantage inside:
  - Alejandra and Varo shared their nominations with the house.
  - Aleska was given an extra nomination point to use on a roommate; she nominated Nacho.
  - Alfredo's original nominations, 2 points for Rosa and a point for Varo, were annulled and he had to nominate two of his roommates.
  - Caramelo removed two nomination points against him.
  - Dania was allowed to view the nominations of the HoH, Julia.
  - Diego chose Caramelo to share his nominations with the house.
  - Erubey's nomination points were doubled, giving 4 points to Diego and 2 points to Carlos.
  - Julia had to lie about her nominations and say that she nominated two of her roommates.
  - Laura was given three extra nomination points, to be given to one housemate of each bedroom. She nominated Alfredo, Nacho and Rey.
  - Luca's points against Carlos were annulled.
  - Lupillo was given 3 extra nomination points and used them on Rosa.
  - Manelyk was able to accompany Nacho to the confession room and hear his nominations.
  - Nacho's nominations of Lupillo and Alejandra were annulled. Additionally, they were deducted two and one point respectively from their total received nomination points.
  - Niurka chose Caramelo to nominate again. He nominated Nacho for 2 points and Varo for a point.
  - Paulo's original nominations, 2 points for Alejandra and a point for Rey, were annulled and a housemate from another bedroom nominated in his place. Uriel nominated for him.
  - Rosa stayed in the confession room to hear the next housemate's nominations, which was Rey.
  - Rey and Rosa were unable to share Rey's nominations until after the Salvation.
  - Uriel chose the piggy bank of the next housemate to nominate.
- ^Note 4 : In Week 4, several housemates conspired and announced their nominations to rig the results. If a housemate nominated their announced nominees, that nomination would be voided.
- ^Note 5 : In Week 5, several housemates were punished with extra nomination points against them due to continued plotting over nominations. The extra points were assigned via a roulette wheel and ranged from one point to 4 points. As HoH, Manelyk could not receive nomination points and instead was unable to nominate. Alfredo and Caramelo were the only housemates not to be punished.
- ^Note 6 : The HoH competition was played in pairs. Carlos and Julia won the competition and became Co-Head of Household. However, only one could receive immunity, while the other defended their Power to Save. Paulo won a Coin of Destiny that allowed him to give Carlos the immunity and appoint Julia as the defender of the Power to Save.
- ^Note 7 : In addition to winning the HoH, Caramelo received a red and a blue token, each with an advantage for that week's nominations, to give to two housemates. He gave the blue token to Luca, preventing him from nominating that week. He gave the red token to Carlos, giving him the power to double his nomination points.
- ^Note 8 : In Week 8, the housemates voted for who they wanted to save from nomination. The five housemates with the fewest points were nominated.
- ^Note 9 : On Day 57, Alfredo, Lupillo and Rey were offered the Temptation Box in exchange for nominating with 2 points a housemate from their bedroom. Rey rejected the offer, while Alfredo nominated Paty and Lupillo nominated Diego.
- ^Note 10 : On Day 59, Caramelo won the power to spin a wheel to determine the amount of points given to his nominations. The results were -1 point to Dania, 2 points to Paty and -2 points to Diego.
- ^Note 11 : On Day 65, Diego, Niurka and Paty were offered the Temptation Box in exchange for nominating themselves with 2 points. They all accepted the offer.
- ^Note 12 : On Day 66, Caramelo, Luca and Paulo won a ticket to the Tunnel of Terror that allowed them to choose a special power for nominations. Caramelo annulled Lupillo's nominations, Luca removed 4 points against him, and Paulo doubled his nomination points, giving 6 points to Caramelo, 4 points to Rey and 2 points to Manelyk.
- ^Note 13 : On Day 72, Caramelo, Dania and Paulo were offered the Temptation Box in exchange for nominating themselves or a housemate from their bedroom with 2 points. Caramelo nominated himself, Dania nominated Paty and Paulo nominated Diego.
- ^Note 14 : On Day 72, Carlos and Rey each won an Envelope of Destiny that automatically nominated them for eviction. However, they passed a challenge that allowed them to automatically nominate another housemate. Carlos nominated Manelyk and Rey nominated Paulo.
- ^Note 15 : On Day 73, Dania, Diego, Paulo and Rey won the power to spin a wheel to determine the amount of points given to their nominations. The results were:
  - Dania: 3 points to Niurka, -1 point to Caramelo and 1 point to Rey
  - Diego:0 points to Alfredo, -1 point to Niurka and 1 point to Rey
  - Paulo: 3 points to Niurka, 3 points to Rey and 1 point to Caramelo
  - Rey: 1 point to Niurka, 1 point to Caramelo and 1 point to Diego
- ^Note 16 : On Day 78 Luca and Manelyk were offered the Temptation Box in exchange for nominating themselves with 2 points. They both accepted the offer.
- ^Note 17 : Day 80, Dania as HoH granted immunity to one member from each bedroom: Lupillo, Manelyk and Paty, however, only Manelyk and Paty were able to defend their immunity in the Elevator of Destiny.
- ^Note 18 : On Day 86, Lupillo chose to walk from the game due to medical reasons.
- ^Note 19 : On Day 97, Niurka was automatically nominated for eviction for having moved during a game of freeze.
- ^Note 20 : Rosa originally won this week's Head of Household competition. However, due to irregularities and violations of the rules of the competition, it was redone and won by Caramelo.
- ^Note 21 : On Day 106, Dania won the final competition, winning immunity from the final eviction and granting her a place in the finale.

== Total received nominations ==
	Week 1	Week 2	Week 3	Week 4	Week 5	Week 6	Week 7	Week 8	Week 9	Week 10	Week 11	Week 12	Week 13	Week 14	Week 15	Week 16	Week 17 Final	Total
Caramelo	5	0	-2	0	11	3	10	0	2	17	12	2	3	3	0	4	Winner	72
Luca	3	10	0	0	20+1	15	8	2	0	-4	0	2	17	0	8	4	Runner-up	90
Rey	2	0	1	3	5+1	2	18	7	12	16	13	10	2	3	12	1	3rd Place	108
Rosa	~~1~~	~~8~~	10	1	+1	10	2	8	0	9	10	13	18	10	7	6	4th Place	105
Paulo	8	1	0	2	1+1	1	0	2	0	0	0	12	0	18	10	2	5th Place	58
Dania	0	0	0	0	4+1	4	14	2	9	2	0	0	9	7	4	0	6th Place	56
Alfredo	6	0	1	0	9	13	0	2	0	0	6	11	3	4	7	4	Evicted	66
Niurka	0	0	8	6	3+4	1	0	3	25	14	13	9	2	2	0	Evicted		90
Manelyk	4	0	0	0	0	16	0	3	5	15	0	0	3	7	Evicted			53
Paty	1	0	0	0	8+3	0	2	3	14	3	2	0	3	Evicted				39
Lupillo	0	0	4	0	13+4	11	8	2	0	0	0	0	Walked					42
Diego	0	0	12	0	+2	3	8	2	4	5	7	15	Evicted					58
Carlos	0	0	11	0	+3	0	15	4	0	0	10	Evicted						43
Uriel	6	0	0	0	11+2	7	1	5	0	9	Evicted							41
Alejandra	8	9	6	3	2+1	9	4	2	16	Evicted								60
Laura	1	0	0	0	+2	3	0	1	Evicted									7
Julia	2	0	0	4	6+2	0	8	Evicted										22
Erubey	1	8	0	0	5+4	10	Evicted											28
Aleska	5	0	0	0	10+1	Evicted												16
Nacho	4	10	7	2	Evicted													23
Varo	~~4~~	~~11~~	8	Evicted														8
Valentina	0	9	Evicted															9
Salvador	8	Evicted																8

== Episodes ==
No. overall	No. in season	Title	Original release date
Week 1
322	1	"Arranca el juego"	February 4, 2025
323	2	"El primer líder"	February 5, 2025
324	3	"Las nominaciones sacuden La Casa"	February 6, 2025
325	4	"Una gala para salvar"	February 7, 2025
326	5	"Polémico posicionamiento"	February 9, 2025
327	6	"Velada de eliminación"	February 10, 2025
Week 2
328	7	"Desenlace impactante"	February 11, 2025
329	8	"El dinero está en juego"	February 12, 2025
330	9	"Nominaciones y estrategias"	February 13, 2025
331	10	"Salvación en la mira"	February 14, 2025
332	11	"Noche de posicionamiento"	February 16, 2025
333	12	"Eliminación inminente"	February 17, 2025
Week 3
334	13	"Un nuevo líder toma el control"	February 18, 2025
335	14	"Velada de película"	February 19, 2025
336	15	"Destino incierto, riesgo latente"	February 20, 2025
337	16	"En la mira"	February 21, 2025
338	17	"Al ritmo del beat"	February 23, 2025
339	18	"Sacudida total"	February 24, 2025
Week 4
340	19	"Liderazgo entre tensiones"	February 25, 2025
341	20	"Adame y Lupillo juntos en la suite"	February 26, 2025
342	21	"Juego de poder en las nominaciones"	February 27, 2025
343	22	"Robo crucial"	February 28, 2025
344	23	"Reproches, tensión y fiesta"	March 2, 2025
345	24	"Tiempo límite para un habitante"	March 3, 2025
Week 5
346	25	"Turbulenta eliminación"	March 4, 2025
347	26	"Niurka por Niurka"	March 5, 2025
348	27	"Puro fuego en las nominaciones"	March 6, 2025
349	28	"Duelo con Manelyk, un robo en juego"	March 7, 2025
350	29	"Posicionamiento en llamas"	March 9, 2025
351	30	"Adiós a otro famoso"	March 10, 2025
Week 6
352	31	"Reacciones en cadena"	March 11, 2025
353	32	"Lupillo sin filtros"	March 12, 2025
354	33	"Sorpresa en las nominaciones"	March 13, 2025
355	34	"Julia se defiende en un robo"	March 14, 2025
356	35	"Batallas de poder"	March 16, 2025
357	36	"Cuenta regresiva: nueva despedida"	March 17, 2025
Week 7
358	37	"Las secuelas de una despedida"	March 18, 2025
359	38	"Secretos y respuestas"	March 19, 2025
360	39	"Candente gala de nominaciones"	March 20, 2025
361	40	"Paulo se juega la salvación"	March 21, 2025
362	41	"Posicionamiento de alto voltaje"	March 23, 2025
363	42	"Momento crítico"	March 24, 2025
Week 8
364	43	"Sorpresiva eliminación"	March 25, 2025
365	44	"A punto de Caramelo"	March 26, 2025
366	45	"Con el agua al cuello"	March 27, 2025
367	46	"Nominados al ruedo"	March 28, 2025
368	47	"Gala de confesiones"	March 30, 2025
369	48	"Al filo de la octava eliminación"	March 31, 2025
Week 9
370	49	"Dramática eliminación"	April 1, 2025
371	50	"Decisiones que duelen"	April 2, 2025
372	51	"Giro en la suite en plena nominación"	April 3, 2025
373	52	"Rosa está en jaque"	April 4, 2025
374	53	"Posicionamiento explosivo"	April 6, 2025
375	54	"Crucial gala de eliminación"	April 7, 2025
Week 10
376	55	"Sorpresa internacional"	April 8, 2025
377	56	"Carlos brilla como líder"	April 9, 2025
378	57	"De la sorpresa a la emoción"	April 10, 2025
379	58	"Cara a cara"	April 11, 2025
380	59	"Nadie se queda callado"	April 13, 2025
381	60	"Décima eliminación en aguas turbias"	April 14, 2025
Week 11
382	61	"Aleska por Aleska"	April 15, 2025
383	62	"Luca es el nuevo líder"	April 16, 2025
384	63	"Sorpresas de la caja de tentaciones"	April 17, 2025
385	64	"Enfrentan a Luca por un robo"	April 18, 2025
386	65	"Descarga emocional"	April 20, 2025
387	66	"La Casa en vilo por la eliminación"	April 21, 2025
Week 12
388	67	"Sentimientos cruzados"	April 22, 2025
389	68	"Sorpresas bajo nuevo liderazgo"	April 23, 2025
390	69	"Cuando las puertas se cierran"	April 24, 2025
391	70	"El robo está en marcha"	April 25, 2025
392	71	"Noche de suspenso y confrontación"	April 27, 2025
393	72	"Al borde del colapso"	April 28, 2025
Week 13
394	73	"Un adiós que deja huella"	April 29, 2025
395	74	"Pantalla abierta al juego"	April 30, 2025
396	75	"Lupillo causa una tormenta emocional"	May 1, 2025
397	76	"Choque por la salvación"	May 2, 2025
398	77	"Juego revuelto"	May 4, 2025
399	78	"Un maletín endurece el juego"	May 5, 2025
Week 14
400	79	"Impacto tras la salida de Paty"	May 6, 2025
401	80	"Una noche con estrella invitada"	May 7, 2025
402	81	"Decisiones clave"	May 8, 2025
403	82	"Pelean por desafiar a Luca"	May 9, 2025
404	83	"Al borde de la eliminación"	May 11, 2025
405	84	"Las alianzas tambalean"	May 12, 2025
Week 15
406	85	"Eliminación de infarto"	May 13, 2025
407	86	"Noche intensa para Rosa y Caramelo"	May 14, 2025
408	87	"Ansiedad por las nominaciones"	May 15, 2025
409	88	"Camino al robo de salvación"	May 16, 2025
410	89	"Confesiones bajo presión"	May 18, 2025
411	90	"Eliminación que quema"	May 19, 2025
Week 16
412	91	"Niurka defiende sus acciones"	May 20, 2025
413	92	"Primera celebración rumbo a la final"	May 21, 2025
414	93	"Última ronda de nominaciones"	May 22, 2025
415	94	"Desafío de los últimos nominados"	May 23, 2025
416	95	"Suspenso al límite"	May 25, 2025
417	96	"Un adiós fulminante"	May 26, 2025
Week 17
418	97	"El gran debate entre finalistas"	May 27, 2025
419	98	"Visitas que estremecen"	May 28, 2025
420	99	"El camino termina para un habitante"	May 29, 2025
421	100	"Celebración a flor de piel"	May 30, 2025
422	101	"Se cantan las verdades"	June 1, 2025
423	102	"El cierre vibrante de La Casa"	June 2, 2025
