= Diego Soldano =

Argentine actor

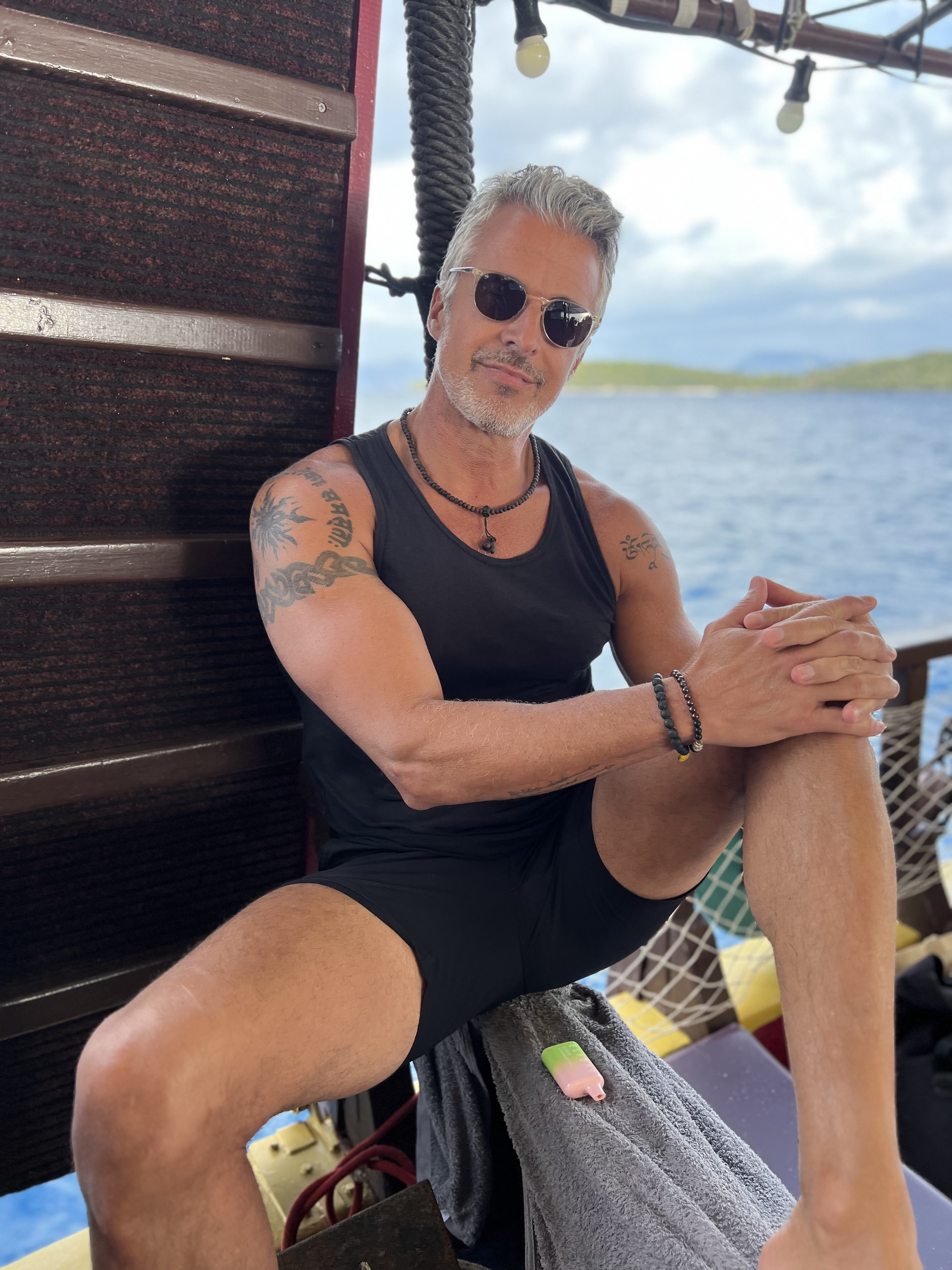
- Soldano in 2023
- Born: January 11, 1969 (age 57); Buenos Aires, Argentina
- Occupation: Actor
- Years active: 2012–present
- Spouse: Shiran Avraham Soldano (married 2024–present)

Diego Soldano, (born January 11, 1969) is an Argentine actor. Better known for his notable roles in the telenovelas, La Patrona, Las trampas del deseo, Los miserables and Señora Acero.

== Personal life ==
Diego Soldano was born in Buenos Aires, Argentina, he is the eldest of four and has three younger sisters.

Soldano married Shiran Avraham Soldano in March 2024.

Diego is father to Dante, Emma and Valentin from a previous relationship.

== Filmography ==
Television
Year	Title	Role	Notes
2012	Por ella soy Eva	Gabriel Ospina	2 episodes
2012	Amor bravío	Dante Barrientos	Recurring role; 14 episodes
2013	La Patrona	Comisionado Rodrigo Balmaceda	Also starring; 57 episodes
2013	Las trampas del deseo	Silvio Galiano	Recurring role
2014–2015	Los Miserables	Pablo Riobueno	Also starring
2015–2016	Señora Acero	Pedro Juárez	Recurring role (season 2); 54 episodes
2017–2020	La Doña	Daniel Llamas	Also starring; 195 episodes
2017–2018	Muy padres	Matías Montellano	Recurring role; 53 episodes
2018	Enemigo íntimo	Federico Montalvo	Recurring role (season 1)
2022	La madrastra	Gaspar Iglesias	Recurring role
2023–present	La casa de los famosos	Himself	Contestant (seasons 3 and 5)

== Awards and nominations ==
Year	Awards	Category	Recipient	Outcome
2013	Premios Tu Mundo	Best Supporting Actor	La Patrona	Nominated
2013	Premios Tu Mundo	The Perfect Couple (with Christian Bach)	La Patrona	Nominated
2015	Premios Tu Mundo	Best Supporting Actor: Novela	Los miserables	Nominated
