= Acapulco Shore series 6 =

Acapulco Shore
- Season 6
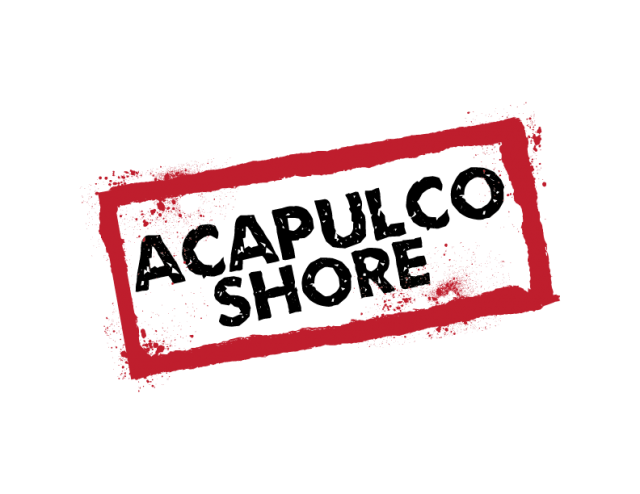
- No. of episodes: 15

Release
- Original network: MTV
- Original release: 30 April – 6 August 2019

Series chronology
- ← Previous; Series 5 Next → Carnival all life

The sixth series of Acapulco Shore, a Mexico television programme based in Acapulco, Mexico was filmed in January and February 2019 and began airing on April 30, 2019. The series was filmed in the Mexican capital Mexico City instead of Acapulco, making this the first series to be filmed here after the special season Acapulco Shore: Nueva Generación in 2017. Ahead of the series, it was announced that former original cast members Luis Méndez and Talía Loaiza would be returning to the show. It was also confirmed that five new cast members had joined the series, including Dania Méndez, Xavier Meade, Jibranne Bazán, Anahí Izali, and Rocío Sánchez who had previously appeared in La Venganza de los Ex, the Mexican version of Ex on the beach. It was also announced that former cast members Danik Michell, Gabriela Ruiz, and Tania Gattas would all be making guest appearances throughout the series. On July 30, 2019, it was announced that Anahí Izali had been expelled from the house by her companions, then she was removed from the program. This series also marks the end for Brenda Zambrano, and original cast member Fernando Lozada.

It is the first season to feature an openly LGBT male cast member.

== Cast ==
- Brenda Zambrano
- Dania Méndez
- Eduardo "Chile" Miranda
- Fernando Lozada
- Jibranne "Jey" Bazán (Episodes 4–15)
- Karime Pindter
- Luis "Jawy" Méndez
- Luis "Potro" Caballero
- Manelyk González
- Manuel Tadeo Fernández
- Rocío Sánchez (Episodes 10–15)
- Talía Loaiza
- Xavier Meade (Episodes 3–15)

=== Special guest ===
- Anahí Izalí (Episodes 7–14)

=== Duration of cast ===
| Cast members | Series 6 | | | | | | | | | | | | | | |
| Cast members | 1 | 2 | 3 | 4 | 5 | 6 | 7 | 8 | 9 | 10 | 11 | 12 | 13 | 14 | 15 |
| Anahí | | | | | | | | | | | | | | | |
| Brenda | | | | | | | | | | | | | | | |
| Dania | | | | | | | | | | | | | | | |
| Eduardo M | | | | | | | | | | | | | | | |
| Fernando | | | | | | | | | | | | | | | |
| Jibranne | | | | | | | | | | | | | | | |
| Karime | | | | | | | | | | | | | | | |
| Manelyk | | | | | | | | | | | | | | | |
| Luis C | | | | | | | | | | | | | | | |
| Luis M | | | | | | | | | | | | | | | |
| Rocío | | | | | | | | | | | | | | | |
| Tadeo | | | | | | | | | | | | | | | |
| Talía | | | | | | | | | | | | | | | |
| Xavier | | | | | | | | | | | | | | | |

= Cast member is featured in this episode.
= Cast member arrives in the house.
= Cast member voluntarily leaves the house.
= Cast member is removed from the house.
= Cast member leaves and returns to the house in the same episode.
= Cast member returns to the house.
= Cast member leaves the series.
= Cast member is removed from the series.
= Cast member features in this episode, but is outside of the house.
= Cast member does not feature in this episode.
= "Cast member" is not a cast member in this episode.

== Episodes ==
| No. overall | No. in season | Title | Duration | Original release date |
|---|---|---|---|---|
| 64 | 1 | "The Holidays Start" | 60 minutes | 30 April 2019 |
| 65 | 2 | "Episode 2" | 60 minutes | 7 May 2019 |
| 66 | 3 | "Episode 3" | 60 minutes | 14 May 2019 |
| 67 | 4 | "Episode 4" | 60 minutes | 21 May 2019 |
| 68 | 5 | "A very gay night" | 60 minutes | 28 May 2019 |
| 69 | 6 | "The Farewell" | 60 minutes | 4 June 2019 |
| 70 | 7 | "Episode 7" | 60 minutes | 11 June 2019 |
| 71 | 8 | "Party in Acapulco" | 60 minutes | 18 June 2019 |
| 72 | 9 | "Episode 9" | 60 minutes | 25 June 2019 |
| 73 | 10 | "Episode 10" | 60 minutes | 2 July 2019 |
| 74 | 11 | "The Polyamory" | 60 minutes | 9 July 2019 |
| 75 | 12 | "Episode 12" | 60 minutes | 16 July 2019 |
| 76 | 13 | "Episode 13" | 60 minutes | 23 July 2019 |
| 77 | 14 | "Episode 14" | 60 minutes | 30 July 2019 |
| 78 | 15 | "Talía's betrayal" | 60 minutes | 6 August 2019 |
