= Acapulco Shore: The family back in Acapulco =

- Season 8
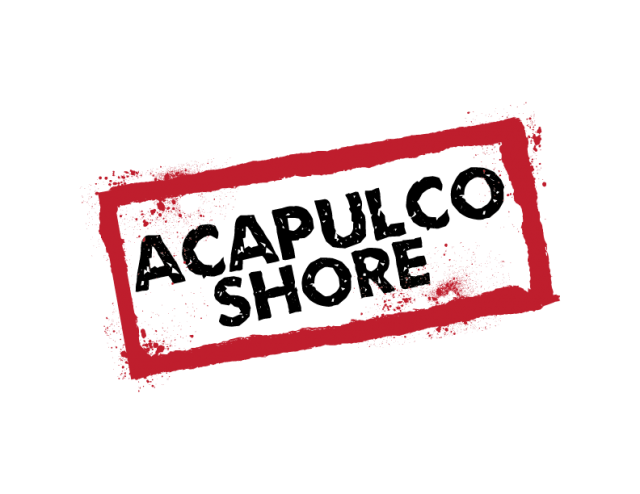
- No. of episodes: 15

Release
- Original network: MTV
- Original release: 27 April – 3 August 2021

Season chronology
- ← Previous; Carnival all life Next → Series 9

The eighth series of Acapulco Shore, a Mexican television programme based in Acapulco was confirmed on 19 January 2021. The eighth season began airing on 27 April 2021, as the show returned to the Acapulco area after 2 seasons, the season has been advertised with the subtitle: The family is back in Acapulco (Spanish: La familia de regreso en Acapulco). The season was filmed in Acapulco, in compliance with local CDC Guidelines related to the COVID-19 pandemic. This is the first series that does not include the original cast members Luis Caballero, Luis Méndez, Manelyk González, Tadeo Fernández and Talía Loaiza, as well as Rocío Sánchez and Xavier Ulibarrí. Prior to the series premiere, it was announced that twelve new cast members Aarón "Capitán" Albores, Alba, Zepeda, Beni Falcón, Charlotte Caniggia, Diana Chiquete, Diego Garciasela from El Mundo Real, Eddie Schobert, Fernanda "Fer" Moreno, Isa Castro, Ignacia "Nacha" Michelson, Jacky Ramírez, Jaylin Castellanos, and Matheus Crivella from De Ferias com o Ex had joined the cast.

It is the first season to feature two LGBT female cast members. Albores was removed by production after showing aggressive behavior and threatening to kill another cast member. Beni Falcón left the series in episode ten. Ignacia Michelson announced her departure from the program to focus on her mental health. Matheus Crivella also did not return to the show after joining Rio Shore.

== Cast ==
- Alba Zepeda
- Beni Falcón (Episodes 1–10)
- Charlotte Caniggia (Episodes 11–15)
- Diego Garciasela
- Eduardo "Chile" Miranda
- Eduardo "Eddie" Schobert (Episodes 8–15)
- Fernanda "Fer" Moreno
- Ignacia "Nacha" Michelson
- Isabel "Isa" Castro
- Jacky Ramirez
- Jaylin Castellanos
- Jibranne "Jey" Bazán
- Karime Pindter
- Matheus Crivella (Episodes 10–15)

=== Special Guest ===
- Aarón "Capitán" Albores (Episodes 1–7)
- Diana Chiquete (Episodes 10–15)
- Ramiro Giménez (Episodes 6–15)

=== Duration of cast ===
Cast members	Series 8														
Cast members	1	2	3	4	5	6	7	8	9	10	11	12	13	14	15
Aarón															
Alba															
Beni															
Charlotte															
Diana															
Diego															
Chile															
Eddie															
Fernanda															
Nacha															
Isa															
Jacky															
Jaylin															
Jey															
Karime															
Matheus															
Ramiro															

= Cast member is featured in this episode.
= Cast member arrives in the house.
= Cast member voluntarily leaves the house.
= Cast member is removed from the house.
= Cast member leaves and returns to the house in the same episode.
= Cast member returns to the house.
= Cast member leaves the series.
= Cast member is removed from the series.
= Cast member returns to the series.
= Cast member does not feature in this episode.
= "Cast member" is not a cast member in this episode.

== Episodes ==
Note: Some episode titles have been adapted to a more understandable English translation.

No. overall	No. in season	Title	Duration	Original release date
96	1	"Let The Holidays Begin"	60 minutes	27 April 2021
97	2	"An Eternal Party"	60 minutes	4 May 2021
98	3	"A Night of Passion"	60 minutes	11 May 2021
99	4	"Women on the Attack"	60 minutes	18 May 2021
100	5	"And The Fight Begins"	60 minutes	25 May 2021
101	6	"Team Tendo In Crisis"	60 minutes	1 June 2021
102	7	"Karime's XV Party"	60 minutes	8 June 2021
103	8	"It's A Burning House"	60 minutes	15 June 2021
104	9	"A Very Shore Pride"	60 minutes	22 June 2021
105	10	"Welcome And Farewell"	60 minutes	29 June 2021
106	11	"Brazilian Party"	60 minutes	6 July 2021
107	12	"The Trial"	60 minutes	13 July 2021
108	13	"The Expulsion"	60 minutes	20 July 2021
109	14	"Surprise Guests"	60 minutes	27 July 2021
110	15	"The Final Party"	60 minutes	3 August 2021

== Impact of the COVID-19 pandemic ==
Filming for the season was originally set to begin on February 13, 2021, but was not possible due to complications related to the COVID-19 pandemic. It was finally registered in Acapulco de Juárez between February 26 and March 20, 2021, amid the COVID-19 pandemic in Mexico, where precautions were taken to ensure the safety of the cast and production team. Both the cast and crew were screened for COVID-19 after being quarantined for two weeks prior to filming. During filming, the production wore personal protective equipment and stood 2 meters from the crew members. The health situation prevented the recordings from proceeding normally, preventing the cast from heading to locations commonly selected for production. Instead, the public spaces were replaced by a mansion that had a club, a restaurant, and a pier.
