= Dania Méndez =

Mexican model and TV personality

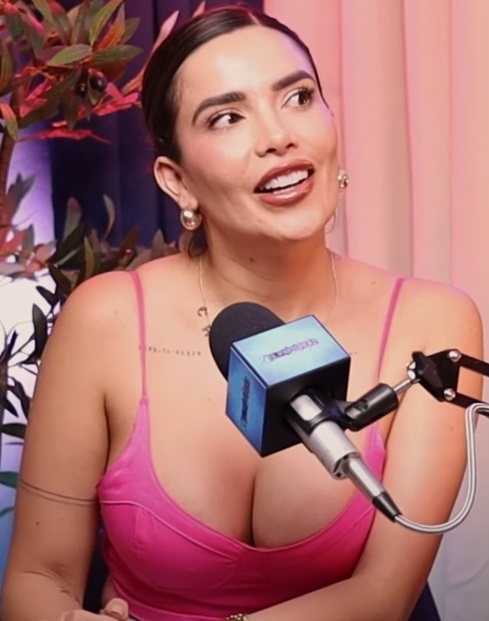
- Méndez in 2024
- Born: Dania Estefania Méndez Arredondo; 6 February 1992 (age 34); Ciudad Guzmán, Mexico
- Occupation: Television personality
- Years active: 2019–present
- Television: Acapulco Shore; La casa de los famosos

Dania Méndez (born 6 February 1992) is a Mexican personality of television, influencer and model. She is known for having participated in Acapulco Shore of MTV.

== Career ==
Her rise to fame came after, in 2019, she was introduced as a cast member on the sixth season of Acapulco Shore. Her time on the MTV show was mired in controversy after controversiales situations that ended in physical altercations with her then co-stars Luis Méndez and Manelyk González. This situation was harshly questioned by the press and the public.

In 2023, Méndez turned into one of the participants of La casa de los famosos, where afterwards of three nominations and 77 days of isolation turned into the ninth eliminated of the program. During her stay in The house of the famous, announced an exchange of famous with Big Brother Brasil. Méndez was selected and exchanged with Key Alves during four days, where her participation saw affected after having suffered sexual bullying by part of two of the Brazilian participants, what ended in the expulsion of both and Méndez decided to return to the American contest. The fact went back focus of attention in both countries.

This same year participated in the reality, The 50, during her stay she suffered an injury in her implants and after being deleted had to subject to a surgery. On 26 September 2023 it was confirmed for the fifth season of Las estrellas bailan en Hoy from Las Estrellas.

== Personal life ==
In 2019, had a romance with Lorduy, integral of Piso 21. The relation finished to ends of 2021, apparently by an infidelity of the urban singer.

== Filmography ==
| Year | Title | Role | Notes |
|---|---|---|---|
| 2019–2020 | Acapulco Shore | Main cast member | Seasons 6-7; 26 episodes |
| 2022 | Acapulco Shock | Panelist | Seasons 2-3 |
| 2023; 2025 | La casa de los famosos | Housemate | 11th evicted (season 3) 6th Place (season 5) |
| 2023 | Big Brother Brasil 23 | Housemate Exchange | |
| 2023 | Los 50 | Contestant | 26th eliminated; 25 episodes |
| 2023 | Las estrellas bailan en Hoy | Contestant with Marco León | Season 5; Runner-Up |

Videoclips

- Más de la una (2021) - Piso 21 & Maluma
- Bye (2023) - Peso Pluma

== Awards and nominations ==
| Year | Prize | Category | Nominated work | Result | Ref. |
|---|---|---|---|---|---|
| 2023 | MTV MIAW Awards | Reality of the Year | Herself | Nominated | |
