= Paty Navidad =

Mexican actress and singer (born 1973)

- Born: Ana Patricia Navidad Lara; May 20, 1973 (age 53); Culiacán, Sinaloa, Mexico
- Other name: Paty Navidad
- Occupations: Actress, singer
- Years active: 1990–present

Ana Patricia "Paty" Navidad Lara (Spanish pronunciation: [ˈana paˈtɾisja ˈpati naβiˈðað ˈlaɾa]; born May 20, 1973) is a Mexican actress and singer.

== Biography ==
Navidad developed an interest in music before acting, mainly influenced by her father, Jesús. She once was quoted as saying that his voice has been her inspiration since she was born. When she was nine years old, she sang to the public for the first time in a school festival, and at fifteen she made her professional debut.

Twitter suspended Navidad's account in January 2021 after she spread false information about the COVID-19 pandemic. In August 2021, her team confirmed she had tested positive for COVID-19 and was hospitalized. By late August, Navidad had recovered enough to return to television.

== Career ==
Navidad participated in the Señorita Sinaloa (Miss Sinaloa) contest which offered as a grand prize a scholarship to Televisa's renowned youth acting academy, the Centro de Educación Artística.

=== Singer ===
Navidad continued her musical career, releasing the album Instantes ("Instances") in 1998 which reached sales of over 100,000, it was awarded gold record. In May 2000 she released her second album entitled "Mexican", rescuing her Mexican roots.

=== Carnival ===
In 2000, Navidad was awarded Queen of the Banda in the Carnival of Mazatlán, Sinaloa for the recording of the disc Don Cruz Lizárraga presenta a Patricia Navidad: Raíces de mi tierra ("Don Cruz Lizárraga presents Patricia Navidad: Roots of my Homeland").

== Television ==
Year	Title	Role	Notes
1992	María Mercedes	Iris	
1993	Los parientes pobres	Esmeralda	
1994–2002	Mujer, casos de la vida real	Various roles	7 episodes
1993	Más allá del puente	Rosalía	
1994	Marimar	Isabel	
1995	Acapulco, cuerpo y alma	Clara	
1996	Cañaveral de pasiones	Mireya	
1997	El alma no tiene color	Sarita	
1997	Picardía mexicana	Herself	Television host
1998	Ángela	Ximena Chávez	
2001	El manantial	María Magdalena Osuna	
2002	Las vías del amor	Rocío Zárate	
2003–2004	Mariana de la noche	Yadira de Guerrero	
2005	Sueños y caramelos	Deborah	
2006–2007	La fea más bella	Alicia Ferreira	
2007	Amor sin maquillaje	Herself	
2008–2009	Juro que te amo	Antonia Madrigal	
2009	Mujeres asesinas	Concha Garrido	"Las Garrido, codiciosas" (Season 2, Episode 2)
2010	Zacatillo, un lugar en tu corazón	Zorayda Dumont de Zárate	Main role
2012	Por ella soy Eva	Mimí de la Rose	Main role
2013–2014	Como dice el dicho	Adela / Erminia	"Entre abogados te veas" (Season 3, Episode 15); "Después de la lluvia neblina..." (Season 4, Episode 1)
2015	Parodiando, noches de traje	Psicóloga	Guest star
2015–2016	Antes muerta que Lichita	Marlene	Guest star
2016	Señora Acero: La Coyote	Margarita Casanova	Recurring role
2017	Mi adorable maldición	Apolonia Ortega Galicia	Main role
2018	Por amar sin ley	Cecilia de Aguirre	Recurring role
2023; 2025	La casa de los famosos	Housemate	Runner-up (season 3) Participating (season 5)
2024	Top Chef VIP	Herself	Winner (season 3)
2026	Tierra de amor y coraje	Roxie	
