= Acapulco Shore =

Mexican television series

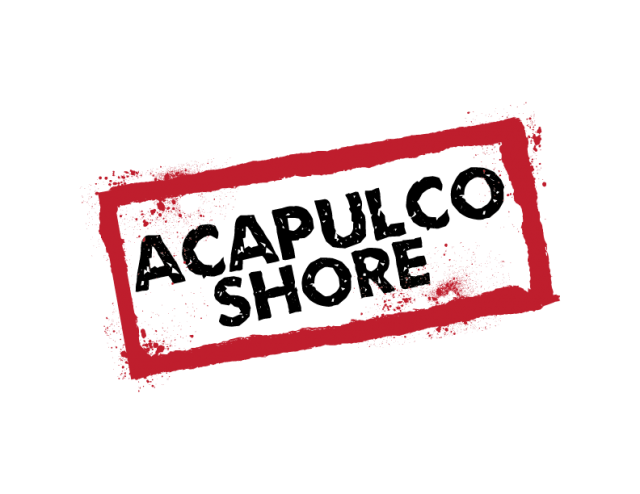
- Genre: Reality
- Created by: MTV
- Opening theme: Acapulco
- Composer: Salón Acapulco
- Country of origin: Mexico
- Original language: Spanish
- No. of seasons: 11 (+6 mini-series)
- No. of episodes: 148

Production
- Executive producers: Carlos Carrera; Ivan Aranda; Eva Borja 2016–17; Carlos Estrada 2017
- Producers: Ivan Aranda; Luis López; Deidra Magallon 2014; Laura Serra 2016–17
- Running time: 43/47 minutes 2014–18; 52/56 minutes 2019–23
- Production company: Litopos Producciones Nippur Media

Original release
- Network: MTV; TV Azteca Mundo
- Release: September 27, 2014 – November 23, 2023

Related
- Super Shore; Mazatlán Shore; Rio Shore; All Star Shore; La Venganza de los Ex

Acapulco Shore is a Mexican reality television series broadcast on MTV Latin America. It premiered on September 27, 2014, and is the Mexican adaptation of the American show Jersey Shore. The show follows the lives of eight participants who live in Acapulco, Mexico. The first season reached 7.2 million people in the Latin American region and was renewed for a second season, with the premiere airing on MTV on May 19, 2015. The tenth season premiered on September 27, 2022.

== History ==
Due to the success of the original American reality TV show Jersey Shore, MTV Latin America decided to produce its own version of the show together with Litopos Productions. "We trust that the Latin American version of the format will entertain and catch the audience in the same way as its previous versions around the world." Maria Iregui, MTVLA manager, said in a press release. Meanwhile, Eduardo Lebrija, vice president general of Viacom International Media Networks, said: "We are very proud to announce Acapulco as the production center for the first Mexican adaption to the Shore franchise, the energy of this place and its vibrant social life. Day and night make the perfect combination for the series."

Jersey Shore, and its adaptions Geordie Shore in the UK, and Gandia Shore in Europe, Now the Mexican adaption is under the creative supervision of Iregui and Federico Cuervo. MTV Latin America announced a casting call in March 2014 and asking to attend "if you consider yourself attractive and are not be afraid of cameras."

The production team had agreements with Acapulco "they simply said today I want to go to Baby (Baby'O), and then we went and we saw how it is. They have very adverse conditions because you have 100 people in a den and they are not going to be limited if there is a camera or not, "added the producer, adding that a den were going to about 40 people.

=== Cancellation ===
On November 3, 2023, during the 2024 Upfront event, Paramount confirmed the show's renewal through a slate of content for 2024. However, there was no announcement regarding the production of a new season; it was unclear until mid-2025 whether this was due to the legal issues of an active cast member or the difficulties Paramount Global faced in managing costs and widespread layoffs.

== Series ==
Year	Series	Predominant location	N# of episodes
2014	Series 1	Acapulco	12
2015	Series 2	Acapulco	13
2016	Series 3	Acapulco	14
2017	Series 4	Riviera Maya	12
2018	Series 5	Acapulco	12
2019	Series 6	Mexico City	15
2020	Series 7	Mazatlán	17
2021	Series 8	Acapulco	15
2022	Series 9	Cartagena, Colombia	14
2022	Series 10	Puerto Vallarta	12
2023	Series 11	Acapulco	13

=== Series 1 (2014) ===
Acapulco Shore began filming in July 2014 in Acapulco, Mexico and was broadcast throughout Latin America in September of that year. Acapulco Shore brings discussions, love triangles and scandalous moments of young people selected in the city.

On August 24, 2014, days before the official broadcast, the official cast of Acapulco Shore was revealed during the broadcast of the 2014 MTV Video Music Awards that took place at The Forum, in Inglewood, California, where they met Talia Loaiza, Luis Caballero, Fernando Lozada, Manelyk González, Tadeo Fernández, Jawy Méndez, Karime Pindter and Joyce Islas.

Acapulco Shore premiered on Saturday, September 27, 2014. The reality show brings together eight young strangers, with values centered on the obsession with the physical, the party and sex, which are recorded for 34 days without a script.

In addition, MTV announced that it would be one of the few programs broadcast without censorship, stating everything that these guys do, will be seen on TV.

=== Series 2 (2015) ===
On October 27, 2014, a second season of Acapulco Shore was announced to premiere in 2015, due to the major success and reception of Season 1.

The cast remained the same as Season 1, with the exception of Joyce Islas who left the program voluntarily in Season 1, and was replaced by Brenda Zambrano. Filming for this season took place in Acapulco and Cancún.

On March 3, 2015, the program premiered on MTV Spain.

This was the last season to feature Brenda Zambrano and Talía Loaiza as main members, making their comeback in the fifth and sixth seasons.

=== Series 3 (2016) ===
MTV Latin America announced the third season of Acapulco Shore in March 2016, and officially premiered on May 17, 2016. New female cast members would be included this season due to Talia Loaiza and Brenda Zambrano not coming back this season.

The new female cast members are Danik Michell, Tania Gattas, and Nicole Olin. This was the last season that featured Fernando Lozada, until his return in season five.

The season consisted of a total of 32 days of recording with the latest technology from 12 robotic cameras, four GoPro cameras and four hand-held cameras. Filming for this season took place in Acapulco, Guadalajara, Puerto Vallarta and Playa del Carmen.

=== Series 4 (2017) ===
The renewal of the program for the fourth season was announced through the official website of MTV Latin America on January 11, 2017. The season premiered on Tuesday, April 11, 2020.

This season, Karime Pindter and Luis "Potro" Caballero selected new house members to bring along for Season 4. Pindter and Caballero recruited new house members after a nationwide search to find new faces for Acapulco Shore. The finalists were chosen in a special titled Acapulco Shore: New Generation. After deliberating, the new group of Shores selected were Víctor Ortíz, Alexya Larios, Antonio Tiburcio, Gabriela Rodríguez and Christian Herrera. Tadeo Fernández returned after leaving at the end of the previous season. Brenda Zambrano, Nicole Olin and Tania Gattas made a brief comeback this season.

=== Series 5 (2018) ===
MTV announced that Season 5 was set to premiere on April 17, 2018. This seasons cast members were officially announced by MTV LA and it was confirmed that Luis "Potro" Caballero, Karime Pindter, Manelyk González, Tadeo Fernandez, Brenda Zambrano, Eduardo Miranda and Fernando Lozada would be participating. New cast members this season include Leslie Gallardo, Maria Usi, and Erick Sandoval. Cintia Cossio and Elettra Lamborghini made brief appearances this season. On June 10, it was confirmed that original cast members Luis "Jawy" Méndez and Talía Loaiza, as well as Víctor Ortíz of Season 4, would make brief appearances this season as well.

Lozada and González left the season but were credited. Brenda Zambrano also announced her exit. The three returned for the sixth season.

=== Series 6 (2019) ===
MTV announced the premiere of the sixth season for April 30, 2019. Luis "Jawy" Méndez and Talia Loaiza were both confirmed to return to the show. New cast members this season include Anahí Izali, Dania Méndez, Jibranne "Jey" Bazán, Xavier Meade and Rocío Sánchez. This was the last season to feature Brenda Zambrano and Fernando Lozada.

=== Series 7: Carnival all Life (2020) ===
On February 19, 2020, a new season was announced, which would be filmed in Mazatlán. The season premiered on June 2, 2020. and had a special theme based on the Mazatlán carnival. On March 4, 2020, MTV announced the official cast for Season 7. New house members this season include Fernanda Moreno, Ignacia Michelson, Isabel Castro, José Arana and Ramiro Giménez. Talía Loaiza returned as a member of the main cast. Brenda Zambrano was invited to return but declined citing she wanted to cut ties with the franchise. This was the last season that featured Dania Méndez, Rocío Sánchez and Xavier Meade, and the original members Manelyk Gonzalez, Luis Cabellero, Luis Méndez, Tadeo Fernández and Talía Loaiza.

=== Series 8: The family back in Acapulco (2021) ===
The eighth season was confirmed on January 18, 2021, through the show's official Instagram page. On March 10 it was announced that it would be filming would take place in Acapulco de Juárez, The season filmed from February 26 to March 20, 2021. The season officially premiered on April 27, 2021. This seasons cast members were made up of mostly an entire new cast, that consisted of Aarón "Capitán" Albores, Alba Zepeda, Beni Falcón, Charlotte Caniggia, Diana Chiquete, Diego Garciasela, Eduardo "Eddie" Schobert, Jacky Ramirez, Jaylin Castellanos and Matheus Crivella from the fourth and sixth season of De Férias com o Ex. along with previous cast members. Xavier Meade and Danik Michell were set to comeback but for unknown reasons did not appear on the season.

=== Series 9 (2022) ===
On July 8, 2021, during the broadcast of the eleventh episode of Acapulco Shock, the start of production of a new season of the show was confirmed. This series was filmed throughout September 2021 in Cartagena and the island of San Andrés both in Colombia. In August 2021, Charlotte Caniggia confirmed her appearance for the ninth season of Acapulco Shore in an interview for "Podemos Hablar" in Argentina, but for unknown reasons did not appear on the season. It is still unknown whether or not Caniggia would appear as a cast member or a special guest. On September 4, 2021, cast member Ignacia Michelson, who was originally set to appear in this season, announced on social media that she had resigned while she was in quarantine. Days later, she announced that the main reasons for her decision were her mental health and health concerns involving her father.

On December 14, 2021, MTVLA announced the Season 9 premiere date for January 18, 2022. Roció Sánchez and Beni Falcon made their return to the show. Carlos Pantoja, José Rodríguez, Nati Peláez García and Santiago Santana joined the main cast. Diego Garciasela, Jibranne Bazán, Kelly Reales, Kelly Medan, Maria Fletcher and Andrés Altafulla joined the house as special guests.

=== Series 10 (2022) ===
On February 15, 2022, Paramount+ unveiled its new lineup of unscripted series and renewals for MTV Entertainment Studios, including renewing the show's next season. The show's tenth season premiere date for September 27, 2022. Filming took place in Puerto Vallarta in June 2022. This would mark the first time the show is filming in public places since Season 7 due to strict regulations involving the COVID-19 pandemic. On August 28, 2022, during the 2022 MTV Video Music Awards broadcast, the official cast was announced, announcing the return of original cast member Luis Méndez, and new housemates Alejandra Varela, Andres Cervantes, Abel Robles, Elizabeth Varela, Ricardo Ochoa, Roberto Mora and Sebastián Galvez. Jaylin Castellanos and Rocío Sánchez made a brief return to the series. Prior to the premiere, Karime Pindter announced that this will mark her final season.

=== Series 11 (2023) ===
The eleventh season of Acapulco Shore premiered on September 5, 2023. It was filmed in April 2023 on the Acapulco shoreline. Half of the cast members from the previous season did not return to the show, following a cast restructuring. Leslie Gallardo, who only participated in the fifth season, returned to the program. For the first time, it features newcomers Abigail Salazar, Andrea Otaola, Jesús Esparza and Regina Coquet. Isabel Castro and Jibranne Bazán returned to the program in the role of guests.

== Cast ==
Cast members	Seasons										
Cast members	1	2	3	4	5	6	7	8	9	10	11
Luis "Potro" Caballero											
Tadeo Fernández											
Manelyk González											
Joyce Islas											
Talía Loaiza											
Fernando Lozada											
Luis "Jawy" Méndez											
Karime Pindter											
Brenda Zambrano											
Tania Gattas											
Danik Michell											
Nicole "Nikki" Olin											
Christian Herrera											
Alexya Larios											
Víctor Ortiz											
Gabriela "Gaby" Rodriguez											
Antonio "Tony" Tiburcio											
Leslie Gallardo											
Eduardo "Chile" Miranda											
Erick Sandoval											
Maria Usi											
Jibranne "Jey" Bazán											
Xavier Meade											
Dania Méndez											
Rocío Sánchez											
Isabel Castro											
Ignacia "Nacha" Michelson											
Fernanda Moreno											
Charlotte Caniggia											
Jaylin Castellanos											
Matheus Crivella											
Beni Falcón											
Diego Garciasela											
Jacky Ramirez											
Eduardo "Eddie" Schobert											
Alba Zepeda											
Andrés Altafulla											
Carlos Pantoja											
Nati Peláez											
José Rodríguez											
Santiago Santana											
Andrés Cervantes											
Sebastián Galvez											
Roberto "Robbie" Mora											
Ricardo "Ricky" Ochoa											
Abel Robles											
Elizabeth Varela											
Regina "Rexx" Coquet											
Jesús "Chuy" Esparza											
Andrea Otaola											
Abigail Salazar											

= Cast member features in this series as part of the main cast

= Cast member features in this series as recurring

= Cast member features in this series as a guest

= Cast member does not feature in this series

== Controversy and criticism ==
The show has caused controversy due to the limits crossed by its protagonists, shown with little censorship.

The Veracruz newspaper wrote a story about the program. "Leaving aside the type of values that the reality show transmits, what ends up being a problem for the cities where it is recorded is its reputation." "Although, at first they see it as an opportunity to promote themselves, the reality is that Jersey, Geordie and Gandía have become preferred destinations for tourism focused on unbridled partying, which causes their traditional tourists to flee the chaos of the young coasts."

The reality of the program and the naturalness of the cast has been questioned, this after several participants admitted on different occasions to simulating situations to generate content.

On June 2, 2020, after the premiere of the seventh season, a large number of criticisms and complaints began (both to the program and to MTV Latin America) through social networks, all this after Dania Méndez was attacked by Jawy Méndez. On June 5, 2020, MTV Spain aired the edition of the chapter and removed this scene, since the violent and explicit content is far from the editorial line of the channel. On June 8, after the broadcast of the second episode of the seventh season, criticism continues now for censorship. MTV Latin America decides to cut an altercation between Dania Méndez and Ignacia Michelson, in which the male participants again intervene against a woman. Part of the censored scene could be seen at the end of the first episode as a trailer for "Next Week". On July 21, during the eighth episode of the seventh season, after a heated argument, Dania Méndez threw a glass and a bottle at Manelyk González, an action that was considered dangerous by both the production and the housemates. The audience's reactions were divided in favor and against.

After what happened, since the eighth season the production has had a security team to avoid physical altercations. However, it is from the tenth edition that these scenes of violence are mostly censored, this due to Paramount's policies. In addition, the censorship since the tenth season has been harshly questioned by the public.

== Reception ==
The program has been MTV Latin America greatest continuous success. It has also served to promote destinations and tourist clubs in Northern Mexico.

The seventh season has a viewership rating of an average of 7,000,000,000 minutes watched. While the episode aired on July 21, 2020 (Season 7, Episode 8) is currently the episode with the most views.

Despite being Viacom International's most watched program, audience ratings have never been published during the seasons' broadcasts.

=== Specials ===
- Acapulco Shore: Pleasure Without Guilt –This special broadcast in 2017, presents all the participants of the first three seasons commenting on everything that happened within the program from 2014 to 2016.
- Acapulco Shore: New Generation – This special aired from March 14 to April 4, 2017, in which Karime Pindter and Luis Caballero introduced 10 new members: Alexya Larios, Antonio Tiburcio, Christian Herrera, Gabriela Rodriguez, Humbie Vallin, Luisa Cavazos, Marlen Martínez, Sofia Herrera and Víctor Ortíz, of which only five of them would be part of the fourth season, Alexya, Antonio, Christian, Gaby and Víctor were selected.
- Acaplay –The first season of this special premiered on January 9, 2018, it presents all the members of the cast until the fourth season except Luis Méndez, Joyce Islas and Nicole Olin. The second season premiered on January 15, 2019. The third season premiered on December 10, 2019, featuring the cast of the sixth season with the exception of Anahí Izalí, Brenda Zambrano and Manelyk González. The fourth season was confirmed on January 30, 2021, and being called "Acaplay Xtremo", being hosted for the first time by Omar Pérez "Faisy", it premiered on February 23, 2021.
- Estudio Shore – This program has been carried out from September 30, 2019, after the premiere of the sixth season, after the launch of each episode, the cast members are interviewed by the MTV Mexico video jockey Jimmy Sirvent. As of the third season released on April 27, 2021, hosted by Juanjo Herrera. The show was not renewed for another season with the airing of Season 10.
- Acapulco Shore: Their History – In this special the original members tell their experiences of having participated in the program, it was released on October 28, 2021. It is based on the special of the MTV UK program, Geordie Shore: Their Stories.
- Acapulco Shock

=== Spin-offs ===
- Mawy: Diario de una convivencia
- Mawy: Del Antro al Campo
- Papi Shore
- Mazatlán Shore
