= Acapulco Shore series 9 =

Acapulco Shore
- Season 9
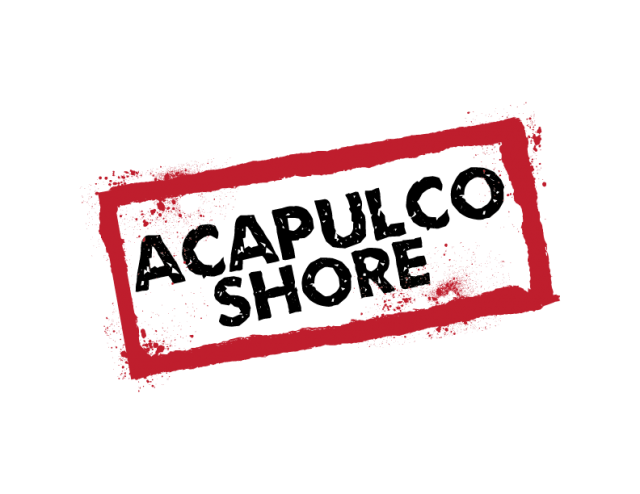
- No. of episodes: 14

Release
- Original network: MTV
- Original release: 18 January – 19 April 2022

Season chronology
- ← Previous; The family back in Acapulco Next → Series 10

The ninth series of Acapulco Shore, a Mexican television programme based in Acapulco was confirmed during the broadcast of one of the episodes of sideshow Acapulco Shock while the previous series aired in 2021. This series was filmed in Colombia throughout September 2021. This series will premiere on January 18, 2022, airing on MTVLA with episodes dropping on Paramount+ the same day.

This series cast and premiere date were announced on December 14, 2021, during that night's broadcast of La Venganza de los Ex VIP. Returning cast member Beni Falcón, and Rocío Sánchez. Debuting this season are Carlos Pantoja, José Rodríguez, Nati Peláez and Santiago Santana. Several guests will be featured in this series, are new cast members Andrés Altafulla, Kelly Reales, Kelly Medanie and María Fletcher.

Charlotte Caniggia and Ignacia Michelson were both confirmed and set to comeback this season as main cast members but for unknown reasons, Caniggia did not appear this season and Michelson arrived in Colombia but left prior to filming due to her father's health condition. None of the rookies from this season returned for the tenth season.

== Cast ==
- Alba Zepeda
- Beni Falcón
- Carlos Pantoja
- Diego Garciasela (Episodes 1–6)
- Eduardo "Chile" Miranda
- Fernanda Moreno
- Isabel "Isa" Castro
- Jacky Ramírez
- Jaylin Castellanos
- José Rodríguez
- Karime Pindter
- Nati Peláez
- Rocío Sánchez (Episodes 4–14)
- Santiago Santana (Episodes 2–14)

=== Special Guest ===
- Andrés Altafulla (Episodes 4–14)
- Jibranne "Jey" Bazán (Episodes 9–12)
- Kelly "Red" Medanie (Episodes 8–10)
- Kelly Reales (Episodes 7–10)
- María Fletcher (Episodes 10–13)

=== Duration of cast ===
Cast members	Series 9													
Cast members	1	2	3	4	5	6	7	8	9	10	11	12	13	14
Alba														
Altafulla														
Beni														
Carlos														
Diego														
Eduardo														
Fernanda														
Isabel														
Jacky														
Jaylin														
Jibranne														
José														
Karime														
Kelly M														
Kelly R														
María														
Nati														
Rocío														
Santiago														

= Cast member is featured in this episode.
= Cast member arrives in the house.
= Cast member leaves the series.
= Cast member returns to the house.
= Cast member returns to the series.
= Cast member does not feature in this episode.
= "Cast member" is not a cast member in this episode.

== Episodes ==
Note: Some episode titles have been adapted to a more understandable English translation.

No. overall	No. in season	Title	Original release date
111	1	"It's The Vacation After The Vacation"	18 January 2022
112	2	"Bad Decisions"	25 January 2022
113	3	"Surprise Date"	1 February 2022
114	4	"Love at First Sight"	8 February 2022
115	5	"Cheers to Polyamory!"	15 February 2022
116	6	"Chilangazo Time!"	22 February 2022
117	7	"Awkward Situations"	1 March 2022
118	8	"Bad Advice"	8 March 2022
119	9	"The Big Banquet"	15 March 2022
120	10	"Thank You For Coming"	22 March 2022
121	11	"A Wild Birthday Party"	29 March 2022
122	12	"Mirror Games"	5 April 2022
123	13	"Viva Cartagena!"	12 April 2022
124	14	"See You Later"	19 April 2022
