= Acapulco Shore: Carnival all life =

- Season 7
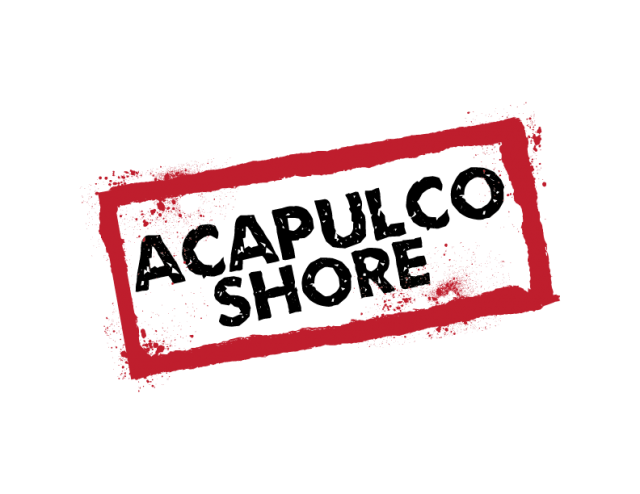
- No. of episodes: 17

Release
- Original network: MTV
- Original release: 2 June – 29 September 2020

Season chronology
- ← Previous; Series 6 Next → The family back in Acapulco

The seventh series of Acapulco Shore, a Mexican television programme based in Acapulco was confirmed on 19 February 2020. It was filmed in February and March. The show began on 2 June 2020. This is the first series to include new cast members Fernanda Moreno, Ignacia Michelson, Isabel Castro, José Arana and Ramiro Giménez. This series marks the return of Talía Loaiza as main cast member, who leaves at the end of the previous series. Ahead of the series it was confirmed that the series would be filmed in a Mexican seaside town Mazatlán.

In the 10th episode, Dania Méndez made an off-camera outing, then came back and announced her departure from the show. Fernanda was expelled by some of her companions from the house. This was the final series to include cast member original Luis Caballero, Luis Méndez, Manelyk González, Tadeo Fernández and Talía Loaiza, as well as Rocío Sánchez and Xavier Meade.

== Cast ==
- Dania Méndez (Episodes 1–11)
- Eduardo "Chile" Miranda
- Fernanda Moreno (Episodes 3–17)
- Ignacia "Nacha" Michelson
- Jibranne "Jey" Bazán
- Karime Pindter
- Luis "Jawy" Méndez
- Luis "Potro" Caballero
- Manelyk González
- Tadeo Fernández
- Talía Loaiza (Episodes 15–17)
- Rocío Sánchez
- Xavier Meade

=== Special guest ===
- Isabel Castro (Episodes 12–17)
- José "Pepe" Aran (Episodes 4–17)
- Ramiro Giménez (Episodes 10–17)

=== Duration of cast ===
Cast members	Series 7																
Cast members	1	2	3	4	5	6	7	8	9	10	11	12	13	14	15	16	17
Dania																	
Eduardo																	
Fernanda																	
Ignacia																	
Isabel																	
Jibranne																	
José																	
Karime																	
Luis C																	
Luis M																	
Manelyk																	
Ramiro																	
Rocío																	
Tadeo																	
Talía																	
Xavier																	

= Cast member is featured in this episode.
= Cast member arrives in the house.
= Cast member voluntarily leaves the house.
= Cast member is removed from the house.
= Cast member leaves and returns to the house in the same episode.
= Cast member returns to the house.
= Cast member leaves the series.
= Cast member returns to the series.
= Cast member features in this episode, but is outside of the house.
= Cast member does not feature in this episode.
= Cast member features in this episode despite not being an official cast member at the time.

= "Cast member" is not a cast member in this episode.

== Episodes ==
Note: Some episode titles have been adapted to a more understandable English translation

No. overall	No. in season	Title	Duration	Original release date
79	1	"It's the Start of the Vacations"	60 minutes	2 June 2020
80	2	"Courtesy Act"	60 minutes	9 June 2020
81	3	"Here's The One That Can't Make It Happen"	60 minutes	16 June 2020
82	4	"The Pitoflon Curse"	60 minutes	23 June 2020
83	5	"It Was Just Hot Dogs"	60 minutes	30 June 2020
84	6	"The Apology Tour"	60 minutes	7 July 2020
85	7	"The Exam"	60 minutes	14 July 2020
86	8	"Let's Go and Fight Again"	60 minutes	21 July 2020
87	9	"Mister Dead D***"	60 minutes	28 July 2020
88	10	"The Witches Are Here"	60 minutes	4 August 2020
89	11	"One First Goodbye"	60 minutes	11 August 2020
90	12	"Viva Carnival!"	60 minutes	18 August 2020
91	13	"Time For Witchcraft"	60 minutes	25 August 2020
92	14	"We Have to Talk"	60 minutes	1 September 2020
93	15	"A Very Steamy Kiss"	60 minutes	8 September 2020
94	16	"One Last Hurrah"	60 minutes	22 September 2020
95	17	"The Engagement"	60 minutes	29 September 2020

== Controversy, censorship and gender violence ==
The violence unleashed throughout the season was criticized for an incident in which a male participant assaulted a woman. For this reason, MTV decided to censor a large part of the scenes in which the cast members were in situations of physical violence.

On June 2, 2020 during the season premiere, in the middle of a physical altercation between Manelyk González and Dania Méndez, the latter was attacked by her co-star Luis Méndez, who in an attempt to end the confrontation between her partner and Dania, he rested his elbow on his Dania face for several seconds. Minutes later in the broadcast of the spin-off program Estudio Shore, Luis said: “I wanted to separate Dania from my girlfriend (Manelyk), what if I separated her and put my elbow on her? Yes I did and one and a million times more ", this caused a wave of claims on social networks, such a scene was edited in future reruns. On June 4, Luis Méndez published a statement on his Instagram in which he apologized for what happened.

Following the airing of the second episode on June 9, 2020, criticism now continues due to censorship. MTV Latin America decided not to broadcast a confrontation between Dania, Ignacia Michelson, Manelyk González and presumably Rocío Sánchez. Part of the censored scene could be seen as the closing of the first episode like the preview of "Next Week". The full showdown was leaked in April 2021.

On July 21, during the eighth episode, after a heated argument, Dania threw glass objects at Manelyk, an action that was deemed "dangerous" by both the production and the housemates. Later in an interview, Dania revealed that both she and Manelyk received a warning from the production.

Following Dania's departure on August 11 during the tenth episode, an off-camera outing as it was not televised, rumors spread that another altercation had broken out. Finally, in an interview with Gerardo Escareño from VayaVayaTV, Dania revealed that Luis Méndez had pushed her, an action that caused her to partially leave the program before permanently leaving the program on August 18, 2020.
