= La casa de los famosos season 3 =

American television reality program

La casa de los famosos
- Season 3
- Hosted by: Héctor Sandarti; Jimena Gallego
- No. of days: 98
- No. of houseguests: 21
- Winner: Madison Anderson
- Runner-up: Paty Navidad
- No. of episodes: 84

Release
- Original network: Telemundo
- Original release: January 17 – April 24, 2023

Season chronology
- ← Previous; Season 2 Next → Season 4

The third season of the American Spanish-language reality television series La casa de los famosos premiered on January 17, 2023, with a live move-in on Telemundo. The show follows a group of celebrities living in a house together while being constantly filmed with no communication with the outside world as they compete to be the last competitor remaining to win the grand cash prize.

The season was announced on August 8, 2022. Héctor Sandarti and Jimena Gallego returned as hosts of the series. The panelists for Sunday's episodes were season one runner-up Manelyk González, season two housemate Laura Bozzo and Mexican TV host Yordi Rosado.

The season concluded on April 24, 2023, after 98 days of competition with Madison Anderson being crowned the winner, and Paty Navidad the runner-up.

== Housemates ==
The first housemates were announced on December 6, 2022. In addition to the regular celebrity housemates, two civilian housemates were chosen by the public to become part of the cast, making this the first season to feature civilians living in the house.

Name	Age	Occupation	Day entered	Status	Ref
Madison Anderson	27	Model and actress	1	Winner; Day 98	
Patricia "Paty" Navidad	49	Actress and singer	1	Runner-up; Day 98	
Pepe Gámez	39	Actor	1	3rd Place; Day 98	
Yameiry "La Materialista" Infante	37	Singer	1	4th Place; Day 98	
José Rodriguez	26	Reality TV star	1	5th Place; Day 98	
Raúl García	35	Orchid arranger	1	Evicted; Day 91	
Diego Soldano	54	Actor	30	Evicted; Day 84	
Dania Méndez	30	Influencer	1	Evicted; Day 77	
Osmel Sousa	76	Beauty pageant entrepreneur	1	Evicted; Day 70	
Arturo Carmona	46	Actor	1	Evicted; Day 63	
Aylín Mújica	48	Actress	1	Evicted; Day 56	
Samira Jalil	31	Influencer	30	Evicted; Day 49	
Rey Grupero	35	Influencer	1	Evicted; Day 42	
Juan Rivera	44	Singer	1	Walked; Day 42	
Aleida Núñez	41	Actress and singer	1	Evicted; Day 35	
Osmariel Villalobos	34	Model and actress	1	Evicted; Day 28	
Aristeo Cázares	27	Athlete	1	Walked; Day 25	
Nicole "Nicky" Chávez	24	Actress	1	Evicted; Day 21	
Liliana Rodríguez	55	Actress	1	Evicted; Day 14	
Monique Sánchez	24	Model and influencer	1	Walked; Day 9	
Jonathan Islas	43	Actor	1	Evicted; Day 7	

=== Housemate Exchange ===
On March 13, 2023, a housemate exchange with Big Brother Brasil was announced. Dania was swapped with Key Alves from Big Brother Brasil 23 on Day 58, with her returning to the house on Day 62. However, Alves has already evicted from Big Brother Brasil. The choice to make the exchange for a housemate who had already been evicted was made due to the rules of the Brazilian's reality show not to bring outside information into the house.

=== Potential civilian housemates ===
On January 9, 2022, ten potential civilian housemates entered the house where the public voted for one man and one woman to join the celebrities. Samira Jalil was not chosen by the public to enter the house, however, she entered the house on Day 30 as a replacement for Monique, who withdrew from the house.

Name	Age	Status
Christopher Carrasco	25	Not Selected
Guillermina Ibáñez	50	Not Selected
Jairo Zapata	39	Not Selected
Miguel Ángel Álvarez	30	Not Selected
Monique Sánchez	24	Selected
Paola Villalobos	29	Not Selected
Raúl García	35	Selected
Romario Ariosa	27	Not Selected
Samira Jalil	31	Not Selected
Scarleth Hernández	24	Not Selected

== Nominations table ==
Every week, each participant is called to nominate two of their housemates, with the exception of that week's Head of Household. The first person a housemate nominates is for 2 points, whilst the second nomination is for just 1 point. The four participants with highest points, are nominated for elimination and it is up to the public's vote through Telemundo.com who gets evicted that week.

This housemate was the Head of Household, and could not be nominated.
This housemate was immune from eviction.
This housemate was automatically put up for eviction.

	Week 1	Week 2	Week 3	Week 4	Week 5	Week 6	Week 7	Week 8	Week 9	Week 10	Week 11	Week 12	Week 13	Week 14 Final		
Madison	Juan; Jonathan	Pepe; Aleida	Paty; Dania	Arturo; Paty	Pepe; Arturo	Samira; Diego	Dania; Arturo	Raul; Paty	Arturo; Dania	Yameiry; Dania; Paty	Dania; Raúl; Yameiry	Raúl; Yameiry; José	Yameiry; Raúl; José	Winner (Day 98)		
Paty	José; Jonathan	Madison; Osmariel	Nicky; Rey	Rey; Osmariel	Aleida; Madison	Samira; Diego	Samira; Madison	Madison; Diego	Osmel; Madison	Osmel; Diego; Madison	Madison; José; Yameiry	Madison; Diego; José	Madison; José; Yameiry	Runner-up (Day 98)		
Pepe	Raúl; Rey	José; Madison	Madison; Aristeo	Rey; Madison	Rey; Madison	Yameiry; Rey	Aylín; Madison	Aylín; José	José; Osmel	Raúl; Dania; Yameiry	Dania; José; Raúl	Raúl; José; Yameiry	Raúl; José; Yameiry	Third place (Day 98)		
Yameiry	Liliana; Paty	Liliana; Raúl	Raúl; Pepe	Dania; Arturo	Aleida; Pepe	Samira; Dania	Diego; Samira	Aylín; Diego	Madison; Osmel	Diego; Madison; Osmel	Madison; Pepe; Paty	Diego; Madison; Pepe	Paty; Raúl; Madison	Fourth place (Day 98)		
José	Paty; Liliana	Pepe; Raúl	Pepe; Nicky	Aleida; Aylín	Pepe; Aleida	Diego; Samira	Aylín; Diego	Diego; Aylín	Osmel; Pepe	Osmel; Pepe; Diego	Pepe; Paty; Madison	Raúl; Yameiry; Pepe	Raúl; Madison; Yameiry	Fifth place (Day 98)		
Raúl	Yameiry; Madison	Yameiry; Nicky	Nicky; Rey	Rey; Osmariel	Rey; Aleida	Rey; Diego	Diego; Pepe	Diego; Osmel	Pepe; Osmel	Diego; Pepe; Osmel	Pepe; José; Madison	Pepe; Diego; Madison	Yameiry; Paty; José	Evicted (Day 91)		
Diego	Not in House				Exempt	José; Dania	Arturo; Yameiry	Yameiry; José	Arturo; José	Yameiry; Raúl; Dania	Dania; Raúl; José	Yameiry; Raúl; José	Evicted (Day 84)			
Dania	José; Jonathan	Liliana; Raúl	Nicky; Rey	Rey; Aylín	Aleida; Rey	~~Rey~~; ~~Madison~~	Aylín; Madison	Madison; Aylín	Madison; Osmel	Pepe; Madison; Diego	Madison; Pepe; Yameiry	Evicted (Day 77)				
Osmel	Juan; Jonathan	José; Raúl	Aristeo; Pepe	José; Aristeo	Pepe; Juan	José; Diego	Pepe; Diego	José; Paty	José; Pepe	Paty; Yameiry; Raúl	Evicted (Day 70)					
Arturo	Jonathan; Osmariel	Raúl; Madison	Aristeo; Aleida	Rey; Aleida	Aleida; Rey	Diego; Paty	Diego; Samira	Diego; Madison	José; Osmel	Evicted (Day 63)						
Aylín	José; Nicky	Raúl; Pepe	Pepe; Aristeo	José; Aristeo	Dania; Yameiry	Samira; Dania	Dania; José	José; Yameiry	Evicted (Day 56)							
Samira	Not in House				Exempt	Paty; Rey	Aylín; Yameiry	Evicted (Day 49)								
Rey	Jonathan; Liliana	~~Pepe~~; Raúl	~~Paty~~; Raúl	Paty; Raúl	Pepe; Juan	Samira; Pepe	Evicted (Day 42)									
Juan	José; Osmariel	Pepe; Osmariel	~~Pepe~~; Osmariel	Osmel; Osmariel	Rey; Aleida	Diego; Rey	Walked (Day 42)									
Aleida	José; Jonathan	Madison; José	Paty; Raúl	José; Osmariel	José; Madison	Evicted (Day 35)										
Osmariel	José; Raúl	Paty; Liliana	Paty; Raúl	Dania; Paty	Evicted (Day 28)											
Aristeo	Jonathan; Dania	Pepe; Madison	Nicky; Pepe	Aylín; Osmel	Walked (Day 25)											
Nicky	Aleida; Osmariel	Raúl; Liliana	~~Paty~~; Raúl	Evicted (Day 21)												
Liliana	Osmel; Rey	Nicky; José	Evicted (Day 14)													
Monique	José; Pepe	Walked (Day 9)														
Jonathan	Madison; Rey	Evicted (Day 7)														
Notes	none	1, 2	3, 4, 5	6	7	8, 9, 10	none		11	12	none	13, 14	15, 16			
Head of Household	Aristeo	Rey	José	Pepe	Aylín	Aylín; Osmel	Raúl	Arturo	Raúl	José	Diego	José	None			
Nominated	José; Jonathan; Juan; Liliana	Raúl; Pepe; Madison; José; Liliana	Nicky; Pepe; Paty; Aristeo	Rey; José; Aylín; Dania; Osmariel; Paty	Aleida; Pepe; Rey; Madison	Samira; Diego; Rey; José	Aylín; Diego; Dania; Samira	Diego; Aylín; José; Madison	Osmel; José; Madison; Arturo; Pepe; Paty	Diego; Yameiry; Osmel; Pepe	Madison; Pepe; Dania; José	Raúl; Diego; Madison; José	Raúl; José; Paty; Yameiry	None		
Saved by HoH	José	José	None	Paty	Rey	Samira	Dania	José	Paty	Pepe	None	Raúl	None			
Against public vote	Jonathan; Juan; Liliana	Raúl; Pepe; Madison; Liliana	Nicky; Pepe; Paty; Aristeo	Rey; José; Aylín; Dania; Osmariel	Aleida; Pepe; Madison	Diego; Rey; José	Aylín; Diego; Samira	Diego; Aylín; Madison	Osmel; José; Madison; Arturo; Pepe	Diego; Yameiry; Osmel	Madison; Pepe; Dania; José	Diego; Madison; José	Raúl; José; Paty; Yameiry	José; Madison; Paty; Pepe; Yameiry		
Walked	None	Monique	None	Aristeo	None	Juan	None									
Evicted	Jonathan; 17% to save	Liliana; 18% to save	Nicky; 5% to save	Osmariel; 6% to save	Aleida; 19% to save	Rey; 23% to save	Samira; 23% to save	Aylín; 23% to save	Arturo; 12.4% to save	Osmel; 30% to save	Dania; 14% to save	Diego; Fewest votes to save	Raúl; Fewest votes to save	José; 5th place	Yameiry; 4th place	Pepe; 3rd place
Evicted	Jonathan; 17% to save	Liliana; 18% to save	Nicky; 5% to save	Osmariel; 6% to save	Aleida; 19% to save	Rey; 23% to save	Samira; 23% to save	Aylín; 23% to save	Arturo; 12.4% to save	Osmel; 30% to save	Dania; 14% to save	Diego; Fewest votes to save	Raúl; Fewest votes to save	Paty; Runner-up		
Saved	Juan; Liliana; Most votes	Raúl; Pepe; Madison; Most votes	Pepe; Paty; Aristeo; Most votes	Rey; José; Aylín; Dania; Most votes	Pepe; Madison; Most votes	Diego; José; Most votes	Aylín; Diego; Most votes	Diego; Madison; Most votes	Osmel; José; Madison; Pepe; Most votes	Diego; Yameiry; Most votes	Madison; Pepe; José; Most votes	Madison; José; Most votes	José; Paty; Yameiry; Most votes	Madison; Winner		

- ^Note 1: On Day 9, Monique walked out of the game for her mental health.
- ^Note 2: Due to conspiring about nominating Pepe, Rey's points against him were voided.
- ^Note 3: On Day 13, Raúl won the power of removing two nomination points against him.
- ^Note 4: Due to announcing their nominations to other houseguests, Juan, Nicky and Rey's points against Pepe and Paty were voided.
- ^Note 5: Due to discussing about which nominee to save, José did not have the power to save one of the nominees.
- ^Note 6: On Day 25, Aristeo walked out of the game for personal reasons.
- ^Note 7: On Day 30, Diego and Samira entered the house as new houseguests, replacing Aristeo and Monique. They were immune from nomination and eviction and were ineligible to nominate that week.
- ^Note 8: The HoH competition was played in pairs. Aylín and Osmel won the competition and became Co-Head of Households.
- ^Note 9: On Day 34, Madison won the power of voiding the nominations of any housemate. She chose to void Dania's nominations.
- ^Note 10: On Day 42, Juan walked out of the game.
- ^Note 11: On Day 53, Diego, Paty and Raúl failed a surprise challenge and as punishment they were automatically nominated. However, on day 55, Diego won immunity for the week, while Raúl won the HoH competition on Day 57 and became immunne.
- ^Note 12: Starting in Week 10, each housemate had six nomination points to give to three housemates, the first receiving 3 points, the second receiving 2 points, and the third receiving a single point.
- ^Note 13: José won the HoH competition but did not have immunity from nominations.
- ^Note 14: On Day 76, José won the power to spin a wheel to determine the amount of points given to his nominations. The results were -3 points to Pepe, -2 points to Yameiry, and 1 point to Raúl.
- ^Note 15: Pepe won the final competition, winning immunity from the final eviction and granting him a place in the finale.
- ^Note 16: On Day 83, José won the power to pick cards that would determine the amount of points given to his nominations. The results were -3 points to Yameiry, -2 points to Madison, and 2 points to Raúl.

== Total received nominations ==
	Week 1	Week 2	Week 3	Week 4	Week 5	Week 6	Week 7	Week 8	Week 9	Week 10	Week 11	Week 12	Week 13	Week 14 Final	Total
Madison	3	7	2	1	3	0	3	5	5	5	11	6	2	Winner	53
Paty	3	2	6	4	0	3	0	2	0	4	3	0	5	Runner-up	32
Pepe	1	9	7	0	9	1	3	0	4	7	10	1	0	3rd Place	52
Yameiry	2	2	0	0	1	2	2	3	0	9	3	4	5	4th Place	33
José	14	6	0	6	2	4	1	6	7	0	7	5	6	5th Place	64
Raúl	3	11	6-2	1	0	0	0	2	0	6	5	9	9	Evicted	50
Diego	Not in House				0	10	8	8	0	10	0	7	Evicted		43
Dania	1	0	1	4	2	3	4	0	1	5	9	Evicted			30
Osmel	2	0	0	3	0	0	0	1	9	8	Evicted				23
Arturo	0	0	0	3	1	0	3	0	4	Evicted					11
Aylín	0	0	0	4	0	0	8	6	Evicted						18
Samira	Not in House				0	11	4	Evicted							15
Rey	3	0	3	10	8	5	Evicted								29
Juan	4	0	0	0	2	0	Walked								6
Aleida	2	1	1	3	11	Evicted									18
Osmariel	3	2	1	4	Evicted										10
Aristeo	0	0	6	2	Walked										8
Nicky	1	3	9	Evicted											13
Liliana	4	6	Evicted												10
Monique	0	Walked													0
Jonathan	11	Evicted													11

== Episodes ==
No. overall	No. in season	Title	Original release date	U.S. viewers (millions)	Rating (18–49)
Week 1
136	1	"Bienvenidos"	January 17, 2023	1.39	0.4
137	2	"Reto y privilegio"	January 18, 2023	1.23	0.4
138	3	"Peligro inminente"	January 19, 2023	1.25	0.4
139	4	"En manos de Aristeo"	January 20, 2023	1.25	0.4
140	5	"Bajo la lupa"	January 22, 2023	1.02	0.3
141	6	"Comienzan las despedidas"	January 23, 2023	1.36	0.4
Week 2
142	7	"Uno menos"	January 24, 2023	1.16	0.4
143	8	"Dos en la suite"	January 25, 2023	1.17	0.3
144	9	"Entre abandonos y batallas"	January 26, 2023	1.23	0.3
145	10	"Solicitudes, ayudas y recursos"	January 27, 2023	1.14	0.3
146	11	"Vivencias de Aleida Núñez"	January 29, 2023	0.94	0.2
147	12	"Un viaje que llega a su fin"	January 30, 2023	1.21	0.4
Week 3
148	13	"La partida de una diva"	January 31, 2023	1.31	0.4
149	14	"La suite tiene nuevo dueño"	February 1, 2023	1.28	0.4
150	15	"Especulaciones"	February 2, 2023	1.24	0.3
151	16	"La Casa se fractura"	February 3, 2023	1.23	0.3
152	17	"Divas"	February 5, 2023	0.76	0.2
153	18	"Entre lágrimas y risas"	February 6, 2023	1.29	0.4
Week 4
154	19	"Nicole habla fuerte y claro"	February 7, 2023	1.02	0.3
155	20	"Seducción y flechazos"	February 8, 2023	1.14	0.3
156	21	"Suspicacias a diestra y siniestra"	February 9, 2023	1.24	0.2
157	22	"Gala de definiciones"	February 10, 2023	1.12	0.3
158	23	"El camino de Juan Rivera"	February 12, 2023	0.83	0.2
159	24	"Encuentros ardientes"	February 13, 2023	1.23	0.3
Week 5
160	25	"Es el turno de Osmariel"	February 14, 2023	1.15	0.3
161	26	"Caras frescas"	February 15, 2023	1.33	0.4
162	27	"Se caen las caretas"	February 16, 2023	1.23	0.3
163	28	"Con los nervios de punta"	February 17, 2023	1.23	0.3
164	29	"El rey de reinas"	February 19, 2023	0.94	0.2
165	30	"Unos vienen y otros se van"	February 20, 2023	1.28	0.3
Week 6
166	31	"Aleida Núñez se pone al día"	February 21, 2023	1.24	0.4
167	32	"Prueba superada"	February 22, 2023	1.19	0.3
168	33	"Arde el confesionario"	February 23, 2023	1.14	0.3
169	34	"Los más bellos de La casa"	February 24, 2023	1.23	0.4
170	35	"Confesiones de Paty Navidad"	February 26, 2023	1.05	0.3
171	36	"Resultado impredecible"	February 27, 2023	1.28	0.4
Week 7
172	37	"Todos quieren ganar"	February 28, 2023	1.21	0.3
173	38	"Secretos al descubierto"	March 1, 2023	1.21	0.3
174	39	"Se viene una hecatombe"	March 2, 2023	1.30	0.4
175	40	"Sentimientos encontrados"	March 3, 2023	1.22	0.3
176	41	"El recorrido del Rey"	March 5, 2023	1.10	0.3
177	42	"Alguien más se va"	March 6, 2023	1.27	0.3
Week 8
178	43	"A soltar prenda"	March 7, 2023	1.17	0.3
179	44	"Palpita el amor"	March 8, 2023	1.15	0.3
180	45	"Tensión ante las nominaciones"	March 9, 2023	1.20	0.3
181	46	"Batalla campal"	March 10, 2023	1.10	0.3
182	47	"Divididos"	March 12, 2023	0.90	0.2
183	48	"El amor está en el aire"	March 13, 2023	1.21	0.3
Week 9
184	49	"Nuevas alianzas"	March 14, 2023	1.24	0.3
185	50	"Dónde está Dania"	March 15, 2023	1.31	0.3
186	51	"Juntos de nuevo"	March 16, 2023	1.27	0.3
187	52	"Ante las cámaras"	March 17, 2023	1.12	0.3
188	53	"A ritmo de samba"	March 19, 2023	1.14	0.3
189	54	"Se va la invitada"	March 20, 2023	1.25	0.3
Week 10
190	55	"Una ruptura dolorosa"	March 21, 2023	1.24	0.4
191	56	"Buenos y malos recuerdos"	March 22, 2023	1.17	0.3
192	57	"Mirarse a los ojos"	March 23, 2023	1.29	0.3
193	58	"Cantos de sirena"	March 24, 2023	1.22	0.3
194	59	"Lobos solitaros"	March 26, 2023	1.03	0.2
195	60	"Pacto entre galanes"	March 27, 2023	1.27	0.3
Week 11
196	61	"Se acaba el reinado de "El Zar""	March 28, 2023	1.26	0.3
197	62	"De nominado a dueño de la suite"	March 29, 2023	1.25	0.3
198	63	"Con las cartas sobre la mesa"	March 30, 2023	1.37	0.4
199	64	"La historia de nuestras vidas"	March 31, 2023	1.08	0.3
200	65	"Guerra de titanes"	April 2, 2023	1.00	0.2
201	66	"Fidelidad a prueba"	April 3, 2023	1.42	0.4
Week 12
202	67	"Una experiencia compleja"	April 4, 2023	1.19	0.3
203	68	"Sin caretas"	April 5, 2023	1.32	0.3
204	69	"En dos mitades"	April 6, 2023	1.30	0.4
205	70	"En medio del dilema"	April 7, 2023	1.12	0.3
206	71	"Crece la contienda"	April 9, 2023	1.08	0.3
207	72	"Rupturas y mala vibra"	April 10, 2023	1.29	0.4
Week 13
208	73	"Momento decisivo"	April 11, 2023	1.20	0.3
209	74	"A un paso del triunfo"	April 12, 2023	1.15	0.3
210	75	"Los últimos nominados"	April 13, 2023	1.14	0.3
211	76	"En boca de todos"	April 14, 2023	1.14	0.3
212	77	"Llega la visita"	April 16, 2023	1.14	0.3
213	78	"Más persistencia que resistencia"	April 17, 2023	1.31	0.3
Week 14
214	79	"Nuevas repercusiones"	April 18, 2023	1.27	0.3
215	80	"Las opiniones no empañan la fiesta"	April 19, 2023	1.15	0.3
216	81	"En la recta final"	April 20, 2023	1.15	0.3
217	82	"Es hora de responder"	April 21, 2023	1.01	0.2
218	83	"A la expectativa"	April 23, 2023	1.02	0.2
219	84	"Termina el suspenso"	April 24, 2023	1.68	0.4
