= Mazatlán Shore =

- Genre: Reality
- Showrunner: Manuel Arias
- Country of origin: Mexico
- Original language: Spanish
- No. of seasons: 1
- No. of episodes: 12

Production
- Executive producer: Fernanda Huerta
- Producer: Helder Beltrán
- Editors: Alex Decker; Jorge Arango; Lorenzo Guerra; Ricardo Orozco; Veónica Sosa
- Production company: Ukkata Producciones

Original release
- Network: Paramount+
- Release: 21 April 2026

Related
- Shore franchise; Acapulco Shore

Mazatlán Shore is a Mexican reality television series that premiered on Paramount+ on April 21, 2026. It's the second Mexican version of the American television franchise Jersey Shore, after Acapulco Shore. The show follows the daily lives of ten housemates, all from northern Mexico, who live together for several weeks in Mazatlán, Sinaloa.

== Production ==
In February 2022, Paramount Global announced a new batch of unscripted series and renewals for MTV Entertainment Studios, including new versions of the Shore franchise.

Production on the show began in September 2023, with filming taking place in the state of Sinaloa. On November 3, 2023, during the 2024 Upfront event, Paramount first announced the show as part of its programming for that year. However, in the first half of 2024, several productions were indefinitely halted due to financial difficulties and mass layoffs at Paramount Global.

In March 2026, the show's premiere was confirmed for April 21 of that year.

== Cast ==
Although Paramount did not officially announce the cast, several media outlets confirmed its members. Irvin Villatoro competed in the fourth season of Reto 4 Elementos^{(es)}, and also participated in La Venganza de los Ex. Nancy Araiza was a contestant on the Mexican version of Tentados por la Fortuna (All these appearances took place after the filming of Mazatlán Shore).

Cast member	Age (Note: Ages reflect at the time of filming.)	Hometown	Description
Aldo Arturo	20	Guadalajara	"Flaquillo, sin culillo, pero con buen tornillo"
Alex Sepúlveda	23	Culiacán	"Del rancho a tu mesa princesa"
Brallan Martínez		Culiacán	"Ni muy feo ni muy guapo, ¡pero todas quieren de este plato chiquita!"
Hector Valdez	24	Coahuila	"Fuerza alcohol y mucha diversión"
Irvin Villatoro	27	Chihuahua	"El 'Withfather', rancho, corazón y desmadre"
Nancy Araiza	19	Guadalajara	"Una nena en cuerpo de diosa"
Nayelli Rodríguez	24	Monterrey	"A la orden pa' ti, pa' ti, pa' ti y pa'l desorden"
Roxana Gastélum	25	Monterrey	"Una reina en cuerpo, alma y peda"
Yaritza Lara	25	Zacatecas	"Llegó la potra que nunca podrán montar"
Yuliana Preciado	24	Mazatlán	"Y con ustedes, la perla del pacífico"

=== Duration of cast ===
Cast member	Episodes											
Cast member	1	2	3	4	5	6	7	8	9	10	11	12
Aldo												
Alex												
Brallan												
Hector												
Irvin												
Nancy												
Nayelli												
Roxana												
Yaritza												
Yuliana												

- = Cast member is featured in this episode.
- = Cast member arrives in the house.
- = Cast member voluntarily leaves the house.
- = Cast member returns to the house.
- = Cast member leaves the series.

== Episodes ==
No.	Title	Original release date
1	"Nace una familia shore" "A Shore family is born"	April 21, 2026
2	"El recuento de los daños" "Damage assessment"	April 21, 2026
3	"Las malagradecidas" "The ungrateful ones"	April 21, 2026
4	"Prometer hasta meter" "Promise until you put"	April 28, 2026
5	"Hoy se estrena el Colchadero" "The Colchadero opens its doors today"	April 28, 2026
6	"Despedida de solteros" "Bachelor party"	May 5, 2026
7	"Ellas contra ellos" "Them against them"	May 5, 2026
8	"Mujeres al ataque" "Women on the attack"	May 12, 2026
9	"Se rompió la maldición" "The curse was broken"	May 12, 2026
10	"La gran pelea" "The big fight"	May 19, 2026
11	"El Mazatlán Shore" "The Mazatlán Shore"	May 19, 2026
12	"La fiesta de fiestas" "The party of parties"	May 26, 2026
