= Maripily Rivera =

Puerto Rican actress, model and businesswoman

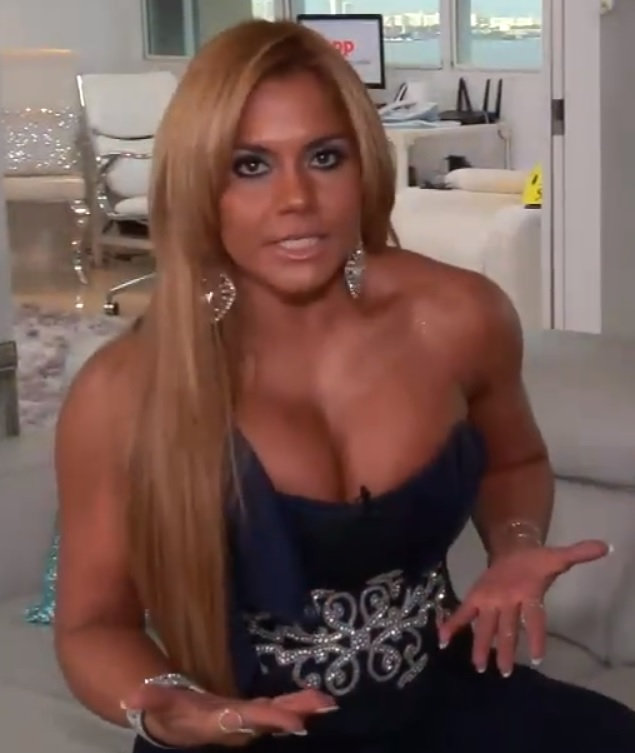
- Maripily Rivera on María Marín Live in 2017
- Born: María del Pilar Rivera Borrero; 15 June 1977 (age 49); Ponce, Puerto Rico
- Education: Interamerican University of Puerto Rico
- Known for: model, businesswoman, television host
- Children: 1
- Website: Pompis stores

María del Pilar "Maripily" Rivera Borrero (born 15 June 1977) is a Puerto Rican actress, model, and television presenter.

== Early years ==
María del Pilar Rivera Borrero was born on 15 June 1977 in Ponce, Puerto Rico. Her parents were Hector Rivera and Pilar Borrero. She earned a B.S. degree in journalism from the Interamerican University of Puerto Rico and for a short time worked as a reporter for Univision.

== Career ==
Rivera Borrero has been a model since 1995 when she took part in the Miss Puerto Rico Petite pageant. She was also a finalist in the 1999 Miss Puerto Rico Petite Pageant. She also starred in the reality show "Famosas VIP" in the Telefutura network. Rivera co-hosted "Eso vale" and "No te duermas" with Héctor Marcano in Puerto Rico's WAPA-TV. She also worked in JAM for Telemundo internacional. Rivera played a casino waitress in the 2009 Puerto Rican film Miente. She was expected to perform in a cameo role in a 2012 Orlando, Florida, charitable fundraising performance of the play Los Monologos de la Vagina (The Vagina Monologues), but backed out two days beforehand due to a contractual dispute and prior year's problem with expense compensation.

Rivera Borrero opened and operated a Guaynabo, Puerto Rico, fashion store for several years called Maripily Boutique, which burned down in 2007, and later reopened. Her current entrepreneurial endeavors include selling her own lines of jeans, swimwear, underwear, shoes, and handbags through the Puerto Rican chain Pompis Store (pompis is Spanish slang for buttocks). Her clothing design places special importance on flattering a range of body types, including plumper figures. In 2013, she launched her own fragrance, MP by Maripily.

== Personal life ==
Rivera Borrero has a son from a relationship with José Antonio García, named José Antonio García Jr., whom she nicknames "Joe Joe".

Rivera Borrero married baseball star Roberto Alomar on 1 June 2009. Rivera accused Alomar of domestic violence and a temporary injunction was granted but the charges against Alomar were later dismissed by the Court. Rivera has been called a "sex symbol", a "drama queen" and the "Paris Hilton of Puerto Rico".

In December 2013, Rivera Borrero became engaged to Alberto Rodríguez, businessman and Chief Operating Officer of Spanish Broadcasting System. The planned May 2014 wedding was to take place at the Ponce Cathedral, Puerto Rico, with a reception at Castillo Serrallés, with Shanira Blanco scheduled to be her maid of honor but was subsequently cancelled. The couple later got together again and continued to see each other for a while. Then later that year, Maripily Rivera made accusations of domestic violence against Rodriguez resulting in his arrest on 29 October 2014. The matter was brought before judge Deborah White-Labora of the Dade County Courthouse, but was dismissed as the prosecution did not have the necessary evidence. Rodriguez was encouraged to bring charges of defamation and slander against Maripily, but responded that he did not want to pursue the matter, wanted to return to his projects at SBS, and said he "wished [Maripily] the best in her life and her career" as he left the courthouse, thus ending their relationship.

== Business ==
Pompis stores is a company established in Puerto Rico in 1995 with affiliation agreements, they have a factory in Colombia and another in China. A certified full-service company dedicated to manufacturing, design, distribution and wholesale sales.

The company has its headquarters in the metropolitan area of Puerto Rico, with 18 stores around the island and online store.

== Filmography ==
Year	Title	Role	Notes
2012	Mira quién baila	Contestant	Season 3: 5th eliminated
2015	Top Chef Estrellas	Contestant	Season 2: 5th eliminated
2020–2021	Guerreros	Contestant of Cobras Team (season 1) Contestant reinforcement of Cobras Team (season 2)	Abandoned (season 1)
2024	La casa de los famosos	Contestant	Season 4: Winner

== See also ==
- List of Puerto Ricans
