= La casa de los famosos =

- Genre: Reality competition
- Created by: John de Mol Jr.
- Based on: Celebrity Big Brother
- Presented by: Héctor Sandarti; Jimena Gallego; Nacho Lozano; Javier Poza
- Country of origin: United States
- Original language: Spanish
- No. of seasons: 6
- No. of episodes: 521

Production
- Executive producers: Alejandro Rincón; Javier Pérez Teuffer; Pancho Calvo; Marcos Gorban
- Production location: Mexico City, Mexico
- Camera setup: Multi-camera
- Running time: 120 minutes
- Production companies: Telemundo Studios; Endemol Shine Boomdog

Original release
- Network: Telemundo
- Release: August 24, 2021 – present

Related
- Gran Hermano

La casa de los famosos (English: The House of the Famous) is an American Spanish-language version of the reality television franchise Celebrity Big Brother, adaptation of Big Brother. The show premiered on Telemundo on August 24, 2021.

This is the fifth adaptation of the international Big Brother format in the United States, after Gran Hermano which was also broadcast on Telemundo and English-language Big Brother broadcast on CBS.

In May 2025, the series was renewed for a sixth season that premiered on February 17, 2026. In May 2026, the series was renewed for a seventh season.

== History ==
The series was announced in early 2021 during the network's upfront presentation for the 2021–22 television season. On July 28, 2021, Telemundo confirmed the premiere of the show for August 24, 2021 with Gabriela Spanic announced as the first participant. On the same day, Hoy Día announced Héctor Sandarti and Jimena Gallego as the hosts of the show. It is co-produced by Telemundo and Endemol Shine Boomdog, a division of Banijay. Francisco "Cisco" Suárez serves as executive producer alongside Pancho Calvo, with Pablo Alonso as showrunner.

On November 16, 2021, the series was renewed for a second season, which premiered on May 10, 2022. On August 8, 2022, the series was renewed for a third season which premiered on January 17, 2023.

On April 11, 2023, Telemundo renewed the series for a fourth season which premiered on January 23, 2024. On September 13, 2023, it was announced Héctor Sandarti would not return as host for the fourth season and was replaced by Nacho Lozano. On May 9, 2024, Telemundo renewed the series for a fifth season. On May 20, 2024, during the fourth season finale, it was announced that the fifth season will be an "All-Stars" season. On December 19, 2024, it was announced that Javier Poza would replace Nacho Lozano as host of the series for the fifth season. The fifth season premiered on February 4, 2025. On May 8, 2025, Telemundo renewed the series for a sixth season. The sixth season premiered on February 17, 2026. On May 7, 2026, Telemundo renewed the series for a seventh season.

=== Cast timeline ===
Color key
Host
Housemate
Panelist

Cast Member	Seasons					
Cast Member	1	2	3	4	5	6
Host
Héctor Sandarti						
Jimena Gállego						
Nacho Lozano						
Javier Poza						
Panelists
Alicia Machado						
Omar Chaparro						
Yolanda Andrade						
Roberto Palazuelos						
Manelyk González						
Laura Bozzo						
Yordi Rosado						
Horacio Villalobos						
Anette Cuburu						
Maripily Rivera						
Sergio Mayer						
Cristina Porta						
René Franco						
Yina Calderón						

=== Companion show ===
La casa de los famosos sin censura (English: The House of the Famous Uncensored) is the companion program of the series where events of the game are discussed and former houseguests are interviewed. During the first two seasons, the program aired weekday mornings and was hosted by Jorge Bernal and Verónica Bastos. For the show's third season, Sin censura was moved to a segment of Hoy Día, with Bernal not returning as host.

== Format ==
Each season revolves around a group of celebrities living in a house together with no communication with the outside world as they compete for a $200,000 prize. They are constantly filmed during their time in the house and are not permitted to communicate with those filming them. Every week, viewers are able to vote on which participant to evict via the show's main website. Viewers can view inside the house at any time with the live feeds.

== Series overview ==
Season	Episodes	Originally released		Days	HouseGuests	Winner	Runner–up	Final vote
Season	Episodes	First released	Last released	Days	HouseGuests	Winner	Runner–up	Final vote
1	58	August 24, 2021	November 15, 2021	84	17	Alicia Machado	Manelyk González	65–14%
2	77	May 10, 2022	August 8, 2022	91	17	Ivonne Montero	Salvador Zerboni	33.8–32.6%
3	84	January 17, 2023	April 24, 2023	98	21	Madison Anderson	Paty Navidad	—N/a
4	102	January 23, 2024	May 20, 2024	119	27	Maripily Rivera	Rodrigo Romeh	—N/a
5 (Note: Also known as La casa de los famosos: All Stars)	102	February 4, 2025	June 2, 2025	119	23	Carlos "Caramelo" Cruz	Luca Onestini	—N/a
6	98	February 17, 2026	June 11, 2026	115	26	Fabio Agostini	Celinee Santos	—N/a

== Reception ==
=== Ratings ===
Viewership and ratings per season of La casa de los famosos
Season	Timeslot (ET)	Episodes	First aired		Last aired		Avg. viewers (millions)
Season	Timeslot (ET)	Episodes	Date	Viewers (millions)	Date	Viewers (millions)	Avg. viewers (millions)
1	Mon–Fri 7:00 p.m.	58	August 24, 2021	1.00	November 15, 2021	1.54	1.16
2	Sun–Fri 7:00 p.m.	77	May 10, 2022	1.08	August 8, 2022	1.66	1.17
3	Sun–Fri 7:00 p.m.	84	January 17, 2023	1.39	April 24, 2023	1.68	1.19
4	Sun–Fri 7:00 p.m.	102	January 23, 2024	1.28	May 20, 2024	1.94	1.31
5	Sun–Fri 7:00 p.m.	102	February 4, 2025	1.10	June 2, 2025	1.90	N/A
6	Sun–Fri 7:00 p.m.	TBA	February 17, 2026	1.30	June 11, 2026	1.80	N/A

=== Awards and nominations ===
Year	Award	Category	Nominated	Result	Ref
2023	Produ Awards	Best Adapted Coexistence Reality Series	La casa de los famosos	Nominated	
2024	Produ Awards	Best Adapted Coexistence Reality Series	La casa de los famosos	Nominated	
2025	Produ Awards	Best Adapted Coexistence and Relationships Reality Series	La casa de los famosos	Nominated	
2025	Produ Awards	Best Reality Show Host	Jimena Gallego	Nominated	
2025	Produ Awards	Best Reality Show Host	Javier Poza	Nominated	

== See also ==
- La Casa de los Mañosos, a web series parodying the reality show
