= Manelyk González =

Mexican TV personality

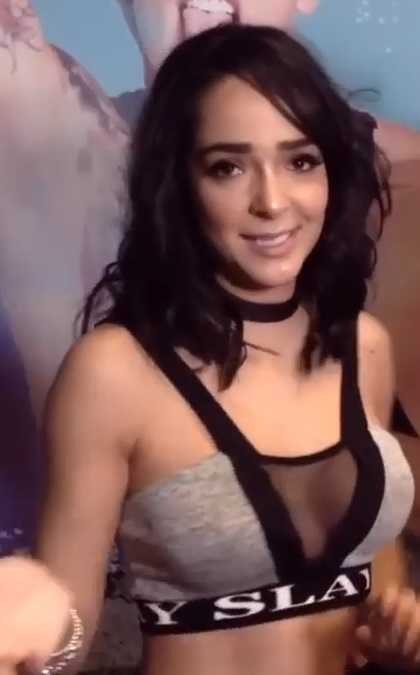
- Mane in 2017
- Born: 12 January 1989 (age 37); Mexico City, Mexico
- Occupation: Television personality
- Years active: 2014–present
- Television: Acapulco Shore; La casa de los famosos

Manelyk González (born January 12, 1989) is a Mexican television personality from Mexico City, known for being a cast member in the MTV reality series Acapulco Shore. She also took part in the first season of La casa de los famosos in 2021, and the fifth, All-Stars season in 2025.

== Career ==
She rose to fame after participating in the first season of the MTV reality show Acapulco Shore that aired for the first time in 2014, being part of the first seven seasons of said program. In 2016 she signed a contract with MTV Spain to participate in Super Shore.

Taking advantage of the fame that the project left her, González agreed to pose for Playboy and also launched herself as a singer, but his career in the music industry did not take off; However, the few singles she released became a reference for the LGBT community.

In 2019 Manelyk participated in the Chilean reality show Resistiré, she had an outstanding participation in said reality show because despite not having won she made it to the finals.

In 2020, during her stay on the Acapulco Shore, the influencer managed to stand out thanks to her constant fights, one of them starring her co-star Dania Méndez, the latter and González had been great friends, so their fight generated a wave of comments and rumors about her situation. In an interview for the program El Minuto Que Cambió Mi Destino, the influencer revealed that the situation got out of control and that thanks to the controversial fight she received death threats outside of the reality show. Today both influencers resumed their friendship.

In 2021, Manelyk became one of the contestants on La casa de los famosos, where after five nominations and 55 days of isolation she became runner-up of the program. In 2023 she was part of Los 50 TV show.

== Personal life ==
In early 2017, her ex-partner David García Ramírez was accused of murder and her relationship with the influencer harmed her. González spoke publicly about the allegations and stated that she no longer had contact with the man and that her relationship had ended 5 years earlier.

She had an on-off relationship with her Acapulco Shore castmate, Jawy Méndez. At the end of 2017 they announced their relationship, which they ended a year later. In July 2019, Méndez confirmed that they had resumed their relationship, and got engaged in January 2021. However, in September the couple split.

== Filmography ==
Year	Title	Role	Notes
2014–2020	Acapulco Shore	Herself	Cast member (seasons 1-7); 81 episodes
2016	Super Shore	Herself	Cast member (seasons 1–2); 26 episodes
2017	Acapulco Shore: Placer Sin Culpa	Herself	Television special; 4 episodes
2018–2019	Acaplay	Herself	Television special; 12 episodes
2018	MTV Millennial Awards 2018	Herself	Digital presenter
2019	RE$I$TIRÉ	Herself	Finalist; 95 episodes
2019	True Love or True Lies?	Herself	Commentator; 12 episodes
2019	Renta congelada	Herself	Special Guest;(seasons 2) Episode: "Hijo Pródigo"
2020	Mawy: Diario de una convivencia	Herself	Cast member; 8 episodes
2020	Veinteañera, divorciada y fantástica	Herself	Film Debut
2020	Acapulco Shore: Placer Sin Culpa	Herself	Television special; 6 episodes
2020	Mawy: Del Antro al Campo	Herself	Cast member; 8 episodes
2021–present	La casa de los famosos	Herself	Runner-Up (season 1) Panelist (seasons 3–4, 6–) Housemate (season 5)
2022	Las Estrellas Bailan en Hoy	Herself	Contestant with Carlos Speitzer; She retired
2022	Las Estrellas Bailan en Hoy: Campeón de Campeones	Herself	Contestant with Luis “Potro” Caballero; Runner-Up
2023	Bola de locos	Herself	Episode: "Ligando en la vecindad"
2023	Los 50	Herself	11th place (season 1)
2023	La Noche Del Diablito	Herself	Special guest (season 2)
2024	¿Quién es la máscara?	Dale Dale	Contestant (season 6)
2025	La casa de los famosos Colombia	Herself	Housemate exchange (season 2)
2025	Cómplices	Elsa	Recurring role
2026	La Granja VIP	Herself	Contestant (season 2)
TBA	El Capo	Manuela	TBA (season 4)
