= La casa de los famosos season 1 =

American television reality program

La casa de los famosos
- Season 1
- Hosted by: Héctor Sandarti; Jimena Gallego
- No. of days: 84
- No. of houseguests: 17
- Winner: Alicia Machado
- Runner-up: Manelyk González
- No. of episodes: 58

Release
- Original network: Telemundo
- Original release: August 24 – November 15, 2021

Season chronology
- Next → Season 2

The first season of the American Spanish-language reality television program La casa de los famosos premiered on August 24, 2021, with a live move-in on Telemundo. The show follows a group of celebrities living in a house together while being constantly filmed with no communication with the outside world as they compete to be the last competitor remaining to win a grand prize of $200,000. Telemundo renewed La casa de los famosos for a second season on November 16, 2021.

The season concluded on November 15, 2021, after 84 days of competition with Alicia Machado being crowned the winner, and Manelyk González the runner-up.

== Format ==
The series follows 16 celebrities living in a house together with no communication with the outside world as they compete for $200,000 prize. They are constantly filmed during their time in the house and are not permitted to communicate with those filming them. During their stay the Housemates share their thoughts on events of the house inside a private room referred to as the Confesionario (Confession Room). Each week, the housemates compete in the Head of Household competition. The winner is immune from eviction. Each housemate has three nomination points to give to two housemates, giving 2 points to one housemate and 1 point to the other. The housemates with the most nomination points are put up for eviction and the Head of Household must save one of the nominees. The public at home is able to vote on which participant to evict via the show's main website. The housemates are assigned tasks in order to win their weekly allowance for food.

== Production ==
=== Development ===
The series was announced at Telemundo's upfront for the 2021–22 television season. On July 28, 2021, it was announced that the series would be premiering on August 24, 2021.

== Housemates ==
16 housemates (Alicia, Anahí, Celia, Christian, Cristina, Daniel, Gabriela, Gisella, Jorge, Kelvin, Kimberly, Pablo, Roberto, Stephany, Uriel & Verónica) entered the game on Day 1. Manelyk González, influencer & reality TV star, was brought in on Day 30 to replace Kimberly Flores who walked out of the game on Day 18 for personal reasons following a conversation with her husband inside the house.

Influencer Christian Estrada was originally announced to enter the series in the weeks prior to broadcast, as one of the housemates to move in during the show's launch, however, for personal reasons, he withdrew from the show.

Name	Age	From	Notability	Day entered	Status
Alicia Machado	44	Maracay, Venezuela	Actress & Miss Universe 1996	1	Winner; Day 84
Manelyk González	32	Mexico City, Mexico	Reality TV star	30	Runner-up; Day 84
Kelvin Noe Rentería	30	Mexico / Dallas, USA	Former participant of Exatlón Estados Unidos	1	3rd place Day 84
Cristina Eustace	42	Chihuahua, México	Singer	1	4th place Day 84
Pablo Montero	47	Torreón, México	Singer & actor	1	5th place Day 84
Gisella Aboumrad	41	Mexico City, México	Actress	1	Evicted; Day 77
Verónica Montes	31	Lima, Perú	Actress	1	Evicted; Day 70
Christian de la Campa	39	Guadalajara, México	Actor	1	Evicted; Day 63
Gabriela Spanic	47	Caracas, Venezuela	Actress	1	Evicted; Day 56
Roberto Romano	31	Toluca, México	Actor	1	Evicted; Day 49
Celia Lora	37	Mexico City, Mexico	Playboy Playmate, daughter of Álex Lora	1	Evicted; Day 42
Jorge Aravena	51	Lima, Perú	Actor	1	Evicted; Day 35
Uriel del Toro	43	Mexico City, Mexico	Actor & model	1	Evicted; Day 28
Daniel Vargas	22	Bogotá, Colombia	Influencer	1	Evicted; Day 21
Kimberly Flores	32	Guatemala City, Guatemala	Fitness coach & model	1	Walked; Day 18
Anahí Izali	31	Acapulco, México	Reality TV star	1	Evicted; Day 14
Stephany "Tefi" Valenzuela	31	Lima, Perú	Model & ex-girlfriend of Eleazar Gómez	1	Evicted; Day 7

== Nominations table ==
Every week, each participant is called to nominate two of their housemates, with the exception of that week's Head of Household. The first person a housemate nominates is for 2 points, whilst the second nomination is for just 1 point. The three participants with highest points, are nominated for elimination and it is up to the public's vote through Telemundo.com who gets evicted that week.

This housemate was the Head of Household, and could not be nominated.
This housemate was immune from eviction.
This housemate was automatically put up for eviction.

	Week 1	Week 2	Week 3	Week 4	Week 5	Week 6	Week 7	Week 8	Week 9	Week 10	Week 11	Week 12 Final		
Alicia	Tefi; Christian	Kimberly; Celia	Celia; Kimberly	Celia; Uriel	~~Gabriela~~; ~~Celia~~	Celia; Verónica	Verónica; Gabriela	Gabriela; Verónica	Christian; Pablo	Verónica; Kelvin	Gisella; Kelvin	Winner (Day 84)		
Manelyk	Not in House				Exempt	Cristina; Christian	Verónica; Gabriela	Verónica; Gisella	Pablo; Christian	Verónica; ~~Pablo~~	Gisella; Pablo	Runner-up (Day 84)		
Kelvin	Daniel; Gisella	Anahí; Christian	Christian; Daniel	Christian; Veronica	~~Jorge~~; ~~Gabriela~~	Verónica; Gabriela	Verónica; Gabriela	Verónica; Gabriela	Alicia; Manelyk	~~Alicia~~; ~~Verónica~~	Manelyk; Cristina	Third place (Day 84)		
Cristina	Pablo; Verónica	Anahí; Alicia	Celia; Uriel	Uriel; Kelvin	Celia; Gabriela	Verónica; Manelyk	Kelvin; Verónica	Verónica; Manelyk	Manelyk; Kelvin	~~Verónica~~; Manelyk	Gisella; Manelyk	Fourth place (Day 84)		
Pablo	Tefi; Daniel	Anahí; Uriel	Daniel; Verónica	Celia; Kelvin	~~Celia~~; ~~Gabriela~~	Verónica; Celia	Manelyk; Verónica	Manelyk; Gabriela	Alicia; Manelyk	Manelyk; ~~Alicia~~	Cristina; Manelyk	Fifth place (Day 84)		
Gisella	Christian; Tefi	Anahí; Alicia	Christian; Alicia	Alicia; Pablo	Jorge; Roberto	Manelyk; Roberto	Manelyk; Roberto	Alicia; Manelyk	Alicia; Manelyk	~~Alicia~~; Manelyk	Manelyk; Kelvin	Evicted (Day 77)		
Verónica	Christian; Cristina	Anahí; Christian	Christian; Alicia	Alicia; Christian	Alicia; Christian	Roberto; Christian	Roberto; Manelyk	Alicia; Christian	Manelyk; Kelvin	Manelyk; Alicia	Evicted (Day 70)			
Christian	Jorge; Roberto	Roberto; Pablo	Pablo; Celia	Pablo; Alicia	~~Celia~~; ~~Gabriela~~	Manelyk; Verónica	Manelyk; Verónica	Alicia; Gabriela	Gisella; ~~Manelyk~~	Evicted (Day 63)				
Gabriela	Tefi; Alicia	Anahí; Kimberly	Daniel; Kimberly	Christian; Roberto	Alicia; Christian	Alicia; Roberto	Roberto; Pablo	Alicia; Christian	Evicted (Day 56)					
Roberto	Christian; Daniel	Anahí; Christian	Christian; Daniel	Uriel; Kelvin	~~Gabriela~~; ~~Celia~~	Celia; Verónica	Gabriela; Verónica	Evicted (Day 49)						
Celia	Christian; Daniel	Anahí; Jorge	Daniel; Christian	Pablo; Alicia	Alicia; Pablo	Alicia; Christian	Evicted (Day 42)							
Jorge	Celia; Kelvin	Cristina; Gisella	Celia; Gisella	Gisella; Kelvin	Cristina; Kelvin	Evicted (Day 35)								
Uriel	Verónica; Jorge	Christian; Anahí	Christian; Alicia	Christian; Celia	Evicted (Day 28)									
Daniel	Gisella; Pablo	Roberto; Pablo	Pablo; Celia	Evicted (Day 21)										
Kimberly	Daniel; Christian	Anahí; Christian	Alicia; Christian	Walked (Day 18)										
Anahí	Verónica; Roberto	Roberto; Celia	Evicted (Day 14)											
Tefi	Kelvin; Gisella	Evicted (Day 7)												
Notes	none				1, 2	none		3	4	5	6			
Head of Household	Anahí	Kelvin	Roberto	Gabriela	Verónica	Gisella	Gisella	Kelvin	Verónica	Gisella	None			
Nominated	Christian; Daniel; Tefi	Anahí; Roberto; Christian	Christian; Celia; Daniel	Christian; Alicia; Celia; Uriel; Pablo	Alicia; Celia; Jorge; Cristina; Christian	Verónica; Manelyk; Celia	Verónica; Manelyk; Roberto; Gabriela	Alicia; Verónica; Gabriela	Manelyk; Alicia; Christian; Pablo	Manelyk; Verónica; Alicia; Kelvin; Cristina; Pablo	Gisella; Manelyk; Cristina	None		
Saved by HoH	Christian	Roberto	Celia	Celia	Celia	Verónica	Gabriela	Alicia	Pablo	None				
Against public vote	Daniel; Tefi	Anahí; Christian	Christian; Daniel	Christian; Alicia; Uriel; Pablo	Alicia; Jorge; Cristina; Christian	Manelyk; Celia	Verónica; Manelyk; Roberto	Gabriela; Verónica	Manelyk; Alicia; Christian	Manelyk; Verónica; Alicia; Kelvin; Cristina; Pablo	Gisella; Manelyk; Cristina	Alicia; Cristina; Kelvin; Manelyk; Pablo		
Evicted	Tefi; 57% to evict	Anahí; 55% to evict	Daniel; 67% to evict	Uriel; 53% to evict	Jorge; Most votes to evict	Celia; 86% to evict	Roberto; 49% to evict	Gabriela; 51% to evict	Christian; 66% to evict	Verónica; 70% to evict	Gisella; 85% to evict	Pablo; 2% to win	Cristina; 6% to win	Kelvin; 13% to win
Evicted	Tefi; 57% to evict	Anahí; 55% to evict	Daniel; 67% to evict	Uriel; 53% to evict	Jorge; Most votes to evict	Celia; 86% to evict	Roberto; 49% to evict	Gabriela; 51% to evict	Christian; 66% to evict	Verónica; 70% to evict	Gisella; 85% to evict	Manelyk; 14% to win		
Saved	Daniel; 43%	Christian; 45%	Christian; 33%	Alicia; Christian; Pablo; Fewest votes	Alicia; Christian; Cristina; Fewest votes	Manelyk; 14%	Verónica; 48% Manelyk; 3%	Verónica; 49%	Manelyk; 25% Alicia; 9%	Pablo; 9% Kelvin; 8% Cristina; 6% Manelyk; 4% Alicia; 3%	Cristina; 10% Manelyk; 5%	Alicia; 65% to win		

- ^Note 1 : Alicia, Christian, Kelvin, Pablo, and Roberto had their nominations voided due to conspiring about nominations to rig the results, which is against the rules.
- ^Note 2 : On Day 30, Manelyk entered the house as a new houseguest, replacing Kimberly. She was immune from nomination and eviction and was ineligible to nominate that week.
- ^Note 3 : During Week 8's head of household competition, the houseguests had to find the four chips that each contained a code to open the briefcase the chip corresponded to. Manelyk opened briefcase #1 that granted her the advantage to give nomination points of 2 and 2 instead of the usual points of 2 and 1. Verónica opened briefcase #2 that granted her the advantage to remove one nomination point against her. Kelvin opened briefcase #3 and won the HoH. Christian opened briefcase #4 that gave him the disadvantage of one automatic point against him in the nominations.
- ^Note 4 : Due to conspiring about nominating Manelyk, Christian's point against her was voided.
- ^Note 5 : Cristina, Kelvin, Manelyk, and Pablo conspired and announced their nominations to other houseguests. As a result, they had their nominations voided, and were automatically put up for eviction along with Alicia and Verónica, who had the most nominations. Gisella also conspired about her nominations and her points against Alicia were voided, however, due to being Head of Household she was not automatically put up for eviction and instead did not have the power to save one of the nominees.
- ^Note 6 : Alicia won a competition to become the first finalist and was immune from nomination and eviction.

== Total received nominations ==
	Week 1	Week 2	Week 3	Week 4	Week 5	Week 6	Week 7	Week 8	Week 9	Week 10	Week 11	Week 12 Final	Total
Alicia	1	2	5	6	6	4	0	8	6	2	0	Winner	40
Manelyk	Not in House				0	5	7	4	7	6	6	Runner-up	32
Kelvin	3	0	0	4	1	0	2	0	2	1	2	3rd Place	15
Cristina	1	2	0	0	2	2	0	0	0	0	3	4th Place	10
Pablo	3	2	4	5	1	0	1	0	3	0	1	5th Place	20
Gisella	4	1	1	2	0	0	0	2	2	0	6	Evicted	18
Verónica	5	0	1	1	0	9	10	7-1	0	4	Evicted		32
Christian	10	6	12	7	2	3	0	2+1	3	Evicted			46
Gabriela	0	0	0	0	1	1	5	5	Evicted				12
Roberto	2	6	0	1	1	4	5	Evicted					19
Celia	2	2	8	5	2	5	Evicted						24
Jorge	3	1	0	0	2	Evicted							6
Uriel	0	1	1	5	Evicted								7
Daniel	7	0	8	Evicted									15
Kimberly	0	3	2	Walked									5
Anahí	0	19	Evicted										19
Tefi	7	Evicted											7

== Episodes ==
No. overall	No. in season	Title	Original release date	U.S. viewers (millions)	Rating (18–49)
Week 1
1	1	"El gran encuentro"	24 August 2021	1.00	0.3
2	2	"Noche de prueba del líder"	25 August 2021	0.91	0.2
3	3	"Gala de nominación"	26 August 2021	0.99	0.3
4	4	"Viernes de salvación"	27 August 2021	0.85	0.2
5	5	"Lunes de eliminación"	30 August 2021	1.03	0.3
Week 2
6	6	"La despedida de Teri Valenzuela"	31 August 2021	1.07	0.3
7	7	"Miércoles, la prueba del líder"	1 September 2021	0.98	0.3
8	8	"La tensión en la casa"	2 September 2021	1.15	0.4
9	9	"Los habitantes sacan las garras"	3 September 2021	0.99	0.3
10	10	"Anahí adandona la casa"	6 September 2021	1.01	0.3
Week 3
11	11	"Drama por partida doble"	7 September 2021	1.15	0.3
12	12	"Melodrama en la casa"	9 September 2021	0.99	0.3
13	13	"La salvación"	10 September 2021	0.97	0.3
14	14	"¿Por qué se fue Kimberly?"	13 September 2021	1.20	0.4
Week 4
15	15	"Kimberly y Edwin en el estudio"	14 September 2021	1.22	0.4
16	16	"Estalla un nuevo conflicto"	15 September 2021	1.20	0.4
17	17	"La pelea de Pablo y Celia"	16 September 2021	1.14	0.3
18	18	"¿A quién salva Gaby Spanic?"	17 September 2021	1.01	0.3
19	19	"¡Alicia explota contra Gaby!"	20 September 2021	1.15	0.4
Week 5
20	20	"Los dos bandos de la casa"	21 September 2021	1.18	0.4
21	21	"Nominación y traición"	22 September 2021	1.27	0.4
22	22	"Difícil decisión"	24 September 2021	1.11	0.3
23	23	"La tensa eliminación"	27 September 2021	1.16	0.4
Week 6
24	24	"La casa arde"	28 September 2021	1.18	0.4
25	25	"Cristina y Manelyk se enfentan"	29 September 2021	1.22	0.3
26	26	"Alta tensión"	30 September 2021	1.20	0.3
27	27	"Terrible equivocación"	1 October 2021	1.10	0.3
28	28	"El anuncio de una despedida"	4 October 2021	1.41	0.4
Week 7
29	29	"Actitud de ganadora"	5 October 2021	1.31	0.4
30	30	"Revelaciones"	6 October 2021	1.33	0.4
31	31	"La primera vez con Pablo"	7 October 2021	1.30	0.4
32	32	"El dilema de Gisella"	8 October 2021	1.20	0.3
33	33	"En la cuerda floja"	11 October 2021	1.22	0.4
Week 8
34	34	"Nuevo desafío"	12 October 2021	1.30	0.4
35	35	"Reto al ingenio"	13 October 2021	1.20	0.4
36	36	"Se calienta la "suite""	14 October 2021	1.19	0.4
37	37	"Mujeres al borde"	15 October 2021	1.10	0.3
38	38	"Adiós a la fuerza"	18 October 2021	1.30	0.4
Week 9
39	39	"El desahogo de Gaby"	19 October 2021	1.17	0.3
40	40	"La suerte del líder"	20 October 2021	0.96	0.3
41	41	"Aumenta la desconfianza"	21 October 2021	1.19	0.3
42	42	"Nominados en suspenso"	22 October 2021	1.15	0.3
43	43	"Boleto sin retorno"	25 October 2021	1.28	0.3
Week 10
44	44	"Sentimientos explosivos"	26 October 2021	1.23	0.3
45	45	"Las confesiones de Alicia"	27 October 2021	1.14	0.3
46	46	"Intriga al máximo"	28 October 2021	1.14	0.3
47	47	"La importante salvación"	29 October 2021	1.03	0.2
48	48	"Nominados a casa llena"	1 November 2021	1.22	0.3
Week 11
49	49	"Agridulce adiós de Verónica"	2 November 2021	1.18	0.3
50	50	"De nominada a finalista"	3 November 2021	1.12	0.3
51	51	"Alboroto por la suegra"	4 November 2021	1.15	0.3
52	52	"Celebración de finalistas"	5 November 2021	1.16	0.3
53	53	"Salida forzosa"	8 November 2021	1.21	0.3
Week 12
54	54	"Cinco famosos a la final"	9 November 2021	1.15	0.3
55	55	"Sorpresa para Alicia"	10 November 2021	1.17	0.3
56	56	"Las verdades de los habitantes"	11 November 2021	1.17	0.3
57	57	"Intenso rumbo a la final"	12 November 2021	1.15	0.3
58	58	"Sorprendente final"	15 November 2021	1.54	0.5
