= Juego de villanos =

- Genre: Reality competition
- Based on: House of Villains
- Showrunner: Hernán Huñis
- Presented by: Facundo Gómez
- Country of origin: United States
- Original language: Spanish
- No. of seasons: 1
- No. of episodes: 26

Production
- Executive producers: Juan Pablo Ybarra; Harold Sánchez
- Production company: Banijay Colombia

Original release
- Network: Telemundo
- Release: October 20, 2026 – present

Juego de villanos is an American reality competition series that premiered on Telemundo on October 20, 2026. It is a Spanish-language adaptation of House of Villains and features a cast of reality television's notorious villains. Contestants live in a house while competing in challenges for power and safety, voting to banish each other until the last villain remaining wins a $200,000 cash prize and the title of Villain Emperor. The series is hosted by Facundo Gómez.

== Format ==
Each cycle, contestants compete in a Battle Royale challenge to test the players physically, mentally, and emotionally. The winner of the Battle Royale challenge is named Supervillain and wins immunity for the cycle, a reward for themselves and two other villains, and the power to nominate two of their fellow players for elimination. Afterwards, the rest of the contestants compete in the Double Power challenge, where the winner receives immunity and the power to nominate a third player for elimination.

The three nominees then compete in the Redemption Challenge, with the winner saving themselves from elimination. At the Elimination Ceremony, the house votes to eliminate one of the two remaining nominees.

== Contestants ==
The first group of contestants was announced on September 28, 2026. The second group was announced on September 30.

Cast member	Notability/Debut series	Finish
Álex Caniggia	Caniggia libre	TBA
Alicia Machado	La casa de los famosos USA 1	TBA
Arleth Terán	Villain actress	TBA
Awilda Herrera	La isla: desafío extremo 1	TBA
David Ponce	Villain actor	TBA
Lis Vega	Big Brother VIP México 4	TBA
Luca Onestini	Grande Fratello VIP 2	TBA
Nahomi Mejía	Survivor México 3	TBA
Sergio Mayer	Big Brother VIP México 3	TBA
Hans Malpartida "Miguelito"	Tierra brava	10th place
Plutarco Haza	Villain actor	11th place
Julia Argüelles	La casa de los famosos USA 6	12th place
Yamil "Yam Yam" Arocho	Survivor 44	13th place
Aleska Génesis	La casa de los famosos USA 4	14th place
Salvador Zerboni	La casa de los famosos USA 2	15th place
Álex Ghita	Gran Hermano Dúo 3	16th place
Yina Calderón	La casa de los famosos Colombia 2	17th place
Sandra Itzel	La Granja VIP México 1	18th place

== Voting history ==
Color key:

Winner
Runner-Up
3rd Place
Supervillain
Double Power Winner
Nominee
Redemption Winner
Immune
Eliminated

	Episode									
	1/2/3	4/5	6/7/8	9/10/11	12/13	14/15/16	17/18/19	20/21/22	23/24/25	26
Supervillain	Alex G.	Aleska	Lis	Awilda	Plutarco	David	Plutarco	Luca	Alex C.	Lis
Double Power Winner	Alex C.	Salvador	Sergio	Sergio	—N/a (Note: There was no Double Power challenge this cycle. Instead, the Supervillain named the third nominee.)	Arleth	Luca	Sergio	Luca	
Nominees	Julia; Luca; Sandra	Alicia; Arleth; Yina	Alex C. Alex G. Alicia	Miguelito; Plutarco; Salvador	Aleska; Alicia; Awilda	Awilda; Julia; Yam Yam	Alicia; Julia; Nahomi	Alex C. Nahomi; Plutarco	David; Miguelito; Sergio	
Redemption Winner	Luca	Arleth	Alex C.	Miguelito	Alicia	Awilda	Nahomi	Nahomi	Sergio	
Alex C.	Double; Power	Alicia	Alicia	Salvador	Aleska	Julia	Julia	Nominated	Supervillain	
Alicia	Sandra	Nominated	Nominated	Plutarco	Aleska	Julia	Nominated	Plutarco	David	
Arleth	Sandra	Yina	Alex G.	Plutarco	Aleska	Double; Power	Alicia	Alex C.	David	
Awilda	Julia	Alicia	Alex G.	Supervillain	Nominated	Julia	Alicia	Plutarco	No Vote (Note: During the episode 23 Battle Royale challenge, Awilda pulled the "Betrayal Switch", which gave her immunity from nomination but was unable to vote in the elimination ceremony.)	
David	Julia	Yina	Alex G.	Plutarco	Aleska	Supervillain	Julia	Plutarco	Nominated	
Lis	Sandra	Yina	Supervillain	Salvador	Aleska	Yam Yam	Julia	Plutarco	Miguelito	Supervillain
Luca	Sandra	Yina	Alex G.	Salvador	Aleska	Yam Yam	Double; Power	Supervillain	Double; Power	
Nahomi	Sandra	Yina	Alex G. (Note: During the episode 6 Battle Royale challenge, Nahomi opened a box with the option to either become a candidate to be voted as Supervillain, or to receive immunity from nomination and pass the box to another contestant. She chose the Immunity.)	Salvador	Awilda	Yam Yam	Julia	Alex C.	Miguelito	
Sergio	Sandra	Yina	Double; Power	Double; Power	Aleska	Yam Yam	Julia	Double; Power	Miguelito	
Miguelito	Julia	Yina	Alex G.	Plutarco	Aleska	Yam Yam	Julia	Plutarco	Nominated	Eliminated (Episode 25)
Plutarco	Sandra	Yina	Alicia	Nominated	Supervillain	Yam Yam	Supervillain	Nominated	Eliminated (Episode 22)	
Julia	Nominated	Yina	Alex G.	Salvador	Aleska	Nominated	Nominated	Eliminated (Episode 19)		
Yam Yam	Julia	Alicia	Alicia	Salvador	Aleska	Nominated	Eliminated (Episode 16)			
Aleska	Julia	Supervillain	Alicia	Plutarco	Nominated	Eliminated (Episode 13)				
Salvador	Sandra	Double; Power	Alex G.	Nominated	Eliminated (Episode 11)					
Alex G.	Supervillain	Yina	Nominated	Eliminated (Episode 8)						
Yina	Julia	Nominated	Eliminated (Episode 5)							
Sandra	Nominated	Eliminated (Episode 3)								
Eliminated	Sandra; 8 of 14 votes to Eliminate	Yina; 10 of 13 votes to Eliminate	Alex G. 8 of 12 votes to Eliminate	Salvador; 6 of 11 votes to Eliminate	Aleska; 10 of 11 votes to Eliminate	Yam Yam; 6 of 9 votes to Eliminate	Julia; 6 of 8 votes to Eliminate	Plutarco; 5 of 7 votes to Eliminate	Miguelito; 3 of 5 votes to Eliminate	

== Episodes ==
No.	Title	Original release date
1	"Bienvenidos al infierno"	October 20, 2026
Battle Royale Challenge (Balls of Hell): Each round, contestants have a giant ball with their face on it in an arena. They must attempt to push their opponent's balls out of the arena while preventing their own ball from being pushed out. The last contestant to have their ball remain in the arena advances to the final round. The contestant that wins the final round becomes Supervillain.
2	"Villanos piratas"	October 21, 2026
Double Power Challenge (Pirate Villains): Played across four rounds. Contestants use a catapult to launch balls and attempt to land them in barrels of their team's color. The team with the most points at the end of the four rounds wins the challenge and must name one team member as the holder of the Double Power.
3	"Carrera por la supervivencia"	October 23, 2026
Redemption Challenge (Deadly Race): Contestants must drive a golf cart through a course while blindfolded, being directed by another contestant of their choice. The contestant with the fastest time wins.
4	"Manos sangrientas"	October 25, 2026
Battle Royale Challenge (Bloody Hands): Each round, one contestant opens a box to reveal two identical bags: one filled with blood and one filled with plasma. They must assign one bag to themselves and one for their opponent. Their opponent then has a minute to decide if they want to keep or switch the bags before they are opened. The contestant who opens the bag of plasma advances to the next round while the contestant with the blood is eliminated from the challenge. The contestant that wins the final round becomes Supervillain.; Double Power Challenge (Exterminator of Evil): Contestants fire balls out of a cannon to knock down cardboard images of their opponent's faces. Each contestants face is displayed four times, each representing a life. The contestant who remains with one life wins the Double Power.
5	"Revolcón inmundo"	October 26, 2026
Redemption Challenge (Filthy Tumble): Contestants start by searching for a scoop hidden in a pool of slime. Once they find their scoop they must use it to transport slime from the pool to their containers. The first contestant to finish wins.
6	"La venganza está en marcha"	October 27, 2026
Battle Royale Challenge: Host Facundo presents a box to the house and announces that three contestants will partake in an election to be voted as Supervillain. To determine these three contestants, the contestant who took the box opens it to reveal their outcome for the challenge, then passes the box to another contestant of their choice to open the next outcome, with this process continuing until three contestants are confirmed as candidates. Outcomes of boxes include being confirmed as one of the candidates, being eliminated from contention, immunity from elimination, or choosing another contestant to eliminate from contention. Afterwards, the three contestants confirmed as candidates have the afternoon to campaign to the remaining contestants before a vote is held to determine the Supervillain.
7	"Sin piedad ni remordimiento"	October 28, 2026
Double Power Challenge: The Supervillain selects a contestant to be handcuffed to a briefcase, who must then choose another contestant to be handcuffed to the briefcase in their place, with this selection process continuing until only one contestant has not been selected. The last contestant to remain unselected wins the contents of the case, which was revealed as the power to elect another contestant to win the Double Power. However, only the 7th, 9th, 11th and 13th contestant that received the briefcase could be eligible to win the Double Power.
8	"Piezas siniestras"	October 29, 2026
Redemption Challenge (Sinister Pieces): Contestants enter the pool to collect pieces of a puzzle and assemble it. The first contestant to finish wins.
9	"Tragos amargos"	October 30, 2026
Battle Royale Challenge (Bitter Drinks): Each round, contestants are blindfolded and one contestant is randomly selected to poison another contestant by placing a drink in front of them. Afterwards, the contestant with the drink tries to guess who placed it there. If they guess correctly, the contestant who assigned them the drink is eliminated from the challenge. However, they are eliminated if they guess incorrectly. Once two contestants remain, they have two minutes to decide the Supervillain among themselves.
10	"Colores en llamas"	November 1, 2026
Double Power Challenge (Colors in Flames): Contestants are divided into three groups that play three rounds. Each round, contestants have a board with six columns of different colors, each consisting of six chips. They must move the chips on their boards to replicate the example pattern. The winners of each round face off in a final round to determine who wins the Double Power.
11	"Curvas peligrosas"	November 2, 2026
Redemption Challenge (Dangerous Curves): Working with another contestant of their choice, contestants must maneuver a ring through a wire loop game. The first contestant to finish wins.
12	"Poder sin límites"	November 4, 2026
Battle Royale Challenge (Lies That Kill): Each round, one contestant takes two briefcases from the vault: one filled with explosive slime and one that is empty. They must assign one briefcase to themselves and one for their opponent. Their opponent then has a minute to decide if they want to keep or switch the briefcases before they are opened. The contestant who opens the empty briefcase advances to the next round while the contestant that is slimed is eliminated from the challenge. The contestant that wins the final round becomes Supervillain.
13	"La estrategia fracasa"	November 5, 2026
Redemption Challenge: Contestants must find six boxes hidden throughout the house, one of them containing a marked figurine. The boxes can only be opened once all six are found. The contestant that has the figurine in their box must save one of the nominees from elimination.
14	"Muerte súbita"	November 6, 2026
Battle Royale Challenge (Sudden Death): Contestants must use a shopping cart to push balls into their opponent's goal. Three goals against a contestant eliminates them from the challenge. The last contestant standing wins.
15	"Sobrevivir es la prioridad"	November 8, 2026
Double Power Challenge (Pirate Villains): Played across four rounds. Contestants use a catapult to launch balls and attempt to land them in barrels of their team's color. The team with the most points at the end of the four rounds wins the challenge and must name one team member as the holder of the Double Power.
16	"Los villanos sacan sus garras"	November 9, 2026
Redemption Challenge (Crazy Milkshakes): Contestants have to drink a milkshake made by non-competing contestants using "exotic" ingredients (tomato juice, pickled onions, cheese). The first contestant to finish wins.
17	"La cacería del traidor"	November 10, 2026
Battle Royale Challenge (Rodent Brain): Each contestant is given 50 nuts for the entire challenge. Each round, contestants privately choose to place a certain amount of nuts into a basket. The contestant(s) with the fewest nuts placed each round is eliminated from the challenge. The last contestant standing wins.
18	"El pacto de los malvados"	November 11, 2026
Double Power Challenge (Villainous Looting): Played in two teams of five. Two contestants first assemble a boat. Afterwards, one of them loads their balls at the port and the other deposits them in their chests on the other side of pool. Two other contestants are positioned at opposite ends to move the boat using ropes. The fifth contestant transports the balls on board. The first team to carry five balls from one end of the pool to the other wins the challenge and must name one team member as the holder of the Double Power.
19	"Escapar de la pesadilla"	November 12, 2026
Redemption Challenge (The Darkest Hour): Contestants enter a dark room and must stick their hands in enclosures of live animals including snakes, rats and roaches to search for tokens. After finding each token, they can assign it to an opponent; contestants are eliminated from the challenge once they are assigned ten tokens. The last contestant standing wins.
20	"Pactos de hielo"	November 13, 2026
Battle Royale Challenge (Cold and Calculating): Each contestant starts with a chest latched with three locks. Throughout the challenge, contestants break through ice cubes to obtain either a lock or key frozen inside. If they find a key, they can unlock one of their locks. If they find a lock, they can add it to an opponent's chest to slow them down. The first contestant to unlock all of their locks and open their chest wins.
21	"De aliados a enemigos"	November 15, 2026
Double Power Challenge (Colors in Flames): Contestants are divided into three groups that each play three rounds. Each round, contestants have a board with six columns of different colors, each consisting of six chips. They must move the chips on their boards to replicate the example pattern. The winners of each round face off in a final round to determine who wins the Double Power.
22	"Payasos del terror"	November 16, 2026
Redemption Challenge (Your Worst Nightmare): Contestants start by looking for two keys to free themselves from their collars and handcuffs. Once freed, they pop balloons to find the keys that open their opponents' boxes. The contestant whose box remains closed wins.
23	"Villanos en fuga"	November 17, 2026
Battle Royale Challenge (Villains on the Run): Played in two teams of five, each team member begins in one of five adjacent cells of their team's cell block. The team member in the first cell must complete a task to break into the second team member's cell. These two team members then break into the third team member's cell, with this process continuing until all five players break out of the fifth cell. Additionally, in each cell is a "Betrayal Switch". If any contestant pulls the switch, they receive immunity from elimination but cannot vote in the next elimination ceremony, and their team is penalized for one minute. The first team to break out of all five cells wins the ability to elect the Supervillain from their team.
24	"Un amigo, un traidor"	November 18, 2026
Double Power Challenge (Countdown): Each round, contestants are positioned at their own podium with a clock they can't see. The clocks start a countdown and contestants have to calculate the passage of time and press their button to stop it, trying to get as close to zero as possible. The player who is farthest from zero in each round is eliminated from the challenge. The last contestant standing wins.
25	"El pequeño gigante"	November 19, 2026
Redemption Challenge (Twisted): Contestants must hang on to spinning screws. The contestant who can hang on the longest over three rounds wins.
26	"Código de villanos"	November 20, 2026
Battle Royale Challenge (Deaf, Blind, and Mute): Played in three teams of three, with one team member gagged, one blindfolded, and one wearing deafening headphones. The gagged team member must mime provided instructions for three party-style challenges to the deafened team member, who then announces these instructions to the blindfolded team member so they can complete the challenges. The first team to finish then individually compete to become Supervillain, where they attempt to find three skull plushies in a bouncy castle while wearing the blindfold. The first contestant to find the skull plushies wins.

== Production ==
On February 23, 2026, it was reported that Telemundo would be producing a Spanish-language adaptation of House of Villains, featuring Latin American celebrities. In May 2026, Juego de villanos was announced as the shows title. Filming for the series began in late August 2026 in Anapoima, Colombia. On September 22, 2026, Facundo Gómez was announced as host of the series.
