= Big Brother México season 4 =

Big Brother México
- Season 4
- Presented by: Adela Micha
- No. of days: 88
- No. of housemates: 15
- Winner: Eduardo Miranda
- Runner-up: Luis Sánchez

Release
- Original network: Canal 5
- Original release: 21 September – 17 December 2015

Season chronology
- ← Previous; Big Brother 3R

Big Brother 2015 (also being marketed as Big Brother PM by the network) is the fourth regular season of Big Brother México, aired by Televisa through Canal 5. This is the show's revival in the country after being off the air for ten years, and its executive producer is Miguel Ángel Fox, one of the country's most recognized television producers. As soon as the announcement of the new season was made in June 2015, castings began both online and through open calls that took place between June and August 2015 all over Mexico.

After much speculation, on September 10, 2015 it was announced that Season 1 host Adela Micha will return to host Big Brother México and the premiered on September 21, 2015 on Canal 5. As they did with the first instalment, Sky will once again provide the 24/7 live coverage of the house.

== Format ==
According to Fox, this season is going to be a more ambitious project than it's ever been before. When asked by reporters about what will be the difference between this updated version of the show versus the ones aired more than ten years ago, Fox states that for this season all challenges will mix extreme and environmental-friendly elements, that it'll be a more psychological experience and also the interaction with viewers with social media.

== Housemates ==
During the press conference held to announce the show, its executive producer, Miguel Ángel Fox, confirmed that a total of 15 contestants will enter the house. Casting calls began on July 11, 2015 and were held in Guadalajara, Mérida, Tijuana, Culiacán, Monterrey & Mexico City.

=== Official Housemates ===
On Launch Night, host Adela Micha announced that on Day 1 (September 21, 2015), only 7 housemates (Ana, Israel, Lilian, Rossana, Shira & Sargento plus intruder Daniel) will actually enter the House that night, the other 7 official housemates (Chintro, Christopher, Danielle, Fanny, Jimena, Paito San & Taka Taka) will enter on Day 2 (September 22, 2015). The official housemates are:

Name	Age	Hometown	Occupation	Nickname	Day entered	Day exited	Status
Eduardo Miranda Romo	21	Estado de México	Public Relations student	El Chile	11	88	Winner
Luis Carlos Sánchez	24	Monterrey, Nuevo León	Rapper	Sargento Rap	1	88	Runner-up
Daniela "Danielle" Fernández Clyde	25	México D.F.	Student	Danielle Clyde	1	88	3rd Place
Ana Mireles Elizondo	27	Monterrey, Nuevo León	Make-up artist	Ana Mireles	1	80	Ejected
Sandra Casar del Carmen	30	Ciudad Victoria, Tamaulipas	Psychologist	Shira	1	80	Ejected
Martha Rossana Salgado Barrera	27	Guadalajara, Jalisco	DJ	Rox	1	80	Evicted
Francisco Vásquez	33	México D.F.	Entrepreneur	Paco Chintro	2	74	Evicted
Israel Rudovsky	29	Guadalajara, Jalisco	Model	El Rudo	1	67	Evicted
Germán Martínez	27	Guadalajara, Jalisco	Party goer	Taka Taka	2	60	Evicted
Andrew Benjamin Witchie González	27	Guadalajara, Jalisco	Bar owner	El Andrew	3	53	Evicted
Christopher Basteris Slocum	21	Mérida, Yucatán	Unemployed	Christopher	2	46	Evicted
Lilian Musi Iga	28	México D.F.	Bank executive	Sor Lili	1	39	Evicted
Francisco Martínez Acevedo	28	Estado de México	Entrepreneur & Vinestar	Paito San	2	32	Evicted
Jimena Longoria Peña	28	Monterrey, Nuevo León	Public Relations	Longoria	2	18	Evicted
Fanny Alejandra Corona	26	Guadalajara, Jalisco	Go-Go dancer	Fanny Coronita	2	11	Evicted
Guests
Name	Age	Hometown	Occupation	Reality Show			
Paula González	21	Barcelona, Spain	Shop assistant	Gran Hermano 15 (Spain)			
Daniel Vera	23	Sabadell, Spain	Kitchen helper	Gran Hermano 16 (Spain)			

Day 1's seventh and final housemate, Daniel Villareal, instead of being an actual housemate, he's the Audience Player, his stay won't be a long one, however he'll play under the audience's instructions during his stay in the house. His original place will be occupied by one of the 3 candidates. He left the House on Day 11, following Fanny's eviction and was replaced by Eduardo.

=== Secret Housemates ===
On September 19, 2015, three potential housemates entered a "Secret Room" inside the house, and they'll stay there for the upcoming 6 days and the public will vote on Canal 5's page on which one of them will become the 15th housemate of this season.

Name	Age	Hometown	Occupation	Nickname
Fernanda Navarro	21	Toluca, Estado de México	Vlogger & Model	Roxy Spiders

== Nomination table ==
	Week 1	Week 2	Week 3	Week 4	Week 5	Week 6	Week 7	Week 8	Week 9	Week 10	Week 11	Week 12 Final		Nominations received
Eduardo	Not in House		2-Francisco M, 2-Luís	1-Eduardo, 4-Danielle, 1-Martha	4-Christopher, 1-Danielle, 1-Israel	3-Christopher, 2-Luís, 1-Sandra	3-Martha, 2-Luís, 1-Shira	-3 -Francisco V	Sandra (3), Luís (2), Martha (1)	5-Luís, 1-Danielle	3-Luís, 2-Martha, 1-Sandra	Winner (Day 88)		44
Luis	Israel, Ana, Danielle	Israel, Lilian, Francisco M	2-Sandra	3-Lilian, 2-Christopher, 1-Danielle	4-Christopher, 1-Francisco V, 1-Germán	3-Israel, 2-Eduardo, 1-Sandra	3-Andrew, 2-Eduardo, 1-Shira	Famous nomination	Guest nomination	5-Francisco V, 1-Eduardo	3-Eduardo, 2-Ana, 1-Sandra	Runner-Up (Day 88)		51
Danielle	Germán, Luís, Martha	Germán, Sandra, Andrew	2-Sandra, 2-Andrew	3-Christopher, 1-Martha, 2-Andrew	3-Germán, 2-Christopher, 1-Sandra	3-Andrew, 2-Eduardo, 1-Sandra	3-Andrew, 2-Germán, 1-Eduardo	3-Eduardo, 2-Germán, 1-Sandra	Eduardo (3), Sandra (2), Luís (1)	3-Eduardo, 3-Francisco V	3-Martha, 2-Luís, 1-Sandra	Third Place (Day 88)		24
Ana	Germán, Francisco M, Fanny	Sandra, Andrew, Francisco V	Not eligible	1-Danielle, 2-Luís, 3-Lilian	6-Christopher	3-Paco, 2-Martha, 1-Sandra	1-Martha	3-Luís, 2-Martha, 1-Germán	Danielle (-3), Francisco V (-2), Eduardo (-1)	3-Martha, 3-Francisco V	3-Sandra, 2-Martha, 1-Luís	Ejected (Day 80)		27
Sandra	Francisco M, Germán, Israel	Ana, Martha, Francisco V	2-Germán	In; Safe Room	4-Germán, 1-Martha, 1-Francisco V	3-Christopher, 2-Germán, 1-Andrew	3-Germán, 2-Eduardo, 1-Luís	Autonomination	Ana (4), Francisco V (3), Eduardo (1)	5-Luís, 1-Eduardo	3-Ana, 2-Eduardo, 1-Danielle	Ejected (Day 80)		7
Rossana	Germán, Fanny, Israel	Sandra, Germán, Francisco V	2-Sandra	2-Lilian, 3-Christopher, 1-Germán	4-Sandra, 1-Sargento, 1-Germán	3-Ana, 2-Francisco V, 1-Christopher	1-Germán	6-Martha	Francisco V (6)	4-Eduardo, 2-Luís	3-Eduardo, 2-Ana, 1-Luís	Evicted (Day 80)		4
Francisco V	Germán, Fanny, Sandra	Sandra, Ana, Christopher	2-Sandra	4-Christopher, 1-Andrew, 1-Lilian	3-Christopher, 2-Germán, 1-Ana	3-Ana, 2-Martha, 1-Sandra	3-Martha, 2-Germán, 1-Luís	Evicted nomination	Sandra (3), Martha (2), Luís (1)	3-Luís, 3-Martha	Evicted (Day 74)			3
Israel	Germán, Fanny, Luís	Germán, Luís, Christopher	Not eligible	In; Safe Room	3-Christopher, 2-Germán, 1-Martha	3-Germán, 2-Christopher, 1-Luís	1-Germán	6-Germán	Nominated	Evicted (Day 67)				3
Germán	Sandra, Ana, Martha	Martha, Israel, Sandra	Not eligible	2-Danielle, 1-Eduardo, 3-Germán	6-Luis	3-Shira, 2-Israel, 1-Martha	3-Shira, 2-Israel, 1-Francisco V	3-Eduardo, 2-Luís, 1-Germán	Evicted (Day 60)					5
Andrew	Not in House	Ana, Sandra, Israel	1-Christopher, 1-Israel	2-Lilian, 1-Eduardo, 3-Luís	3-Christopher, 2-Israel, 1-Sandra	3-Christopher, 2-Danielle, 2-Sandra	1-Martha	3-Danielle, 2-Sargento, 1-Rossana	Evicted (Day 53)					3
Christopher	Israel, Francisco M, Fanny	Francisco V, Lilian, Andrew	4-Israel	3-Francisco V, 1-Ana, 2-Danielle	6-Danielle	3-Israel, 2-Eduardo, 1-Sandra	Evicted (Day 46)							2
Lilian	Israel, Fanny, Germán	Danielle, Sandra, Christopher	2-Eduardo	4-Christopher, 1-Danielle; 1-Lilian	3-Germán, 2-Christopher; 1-Israel	Evicted (Day 39)								2
Francisco M	Sandra, Fanny, Ana	Sandra, Ana, Andrew	3-Martha, 2-Eduardo, 1-Andrew	Nominated	Evicted (Day 32)									1
Jimena	Israel, Fanny, Germán	Germán, Sandra, Francisco V	Evicted (Day 18)											0
Fanny	Ana, Germán, Lilian	Evicted (Day 11)												8
Nomination note	1	2	3	4	5	none		6	7	none	8	9		
Against public vote	Fanny, Germán, Israel	Ana, Andrew, Francisco V, Germán, Jimena, Sandra	Andrew, Israel, Rossana, Sandra	Danielle, Eduardo, Francisco M, Lilian, Luis	Christopher, Danielle, Germán, Lilian, Luis, Sandra	Christopher, Eduardo, Germán, Israel, Sandra	Andrew, Eduardo, Rossana, Sandra	Germán, Luis, Rossana	Francisco V, Israel, Sandra	Ana, Eduardo, Francisco V, Sandra	Eduardo, Luis, Rossana	Danielle, Eduardo, Luis		
Ejected	none										Sandra, Ana	none		
Evicted	Fanny; Fewest votes to save	Jimena; Fewest votes to save	Israel; 25% to fake evict	Francisco M Fewest votes to save	Lilian; Fewest votes to save	Christopher; Fewest votes to save	Andrew; Fewest votes to save	Germán; Fewest votes to save	Israel; Fewest votes to save	Francisco V Fewest votes to save	Rossana; Fewest votes to save	Danielle; Fewest votes to win	Luis; 46.84% to win	
Evicted	Fanny; Fewest votes to save	Jimena; Fewest votes to save	Sandra; 38% to fake evict	Francisco M Fewest votes to save	Lilian; Fewest votes to save	Christopher; Fewest votes to save	Andrew; Fewest votes to save	Germán; Fewest votes to save	Israel; Fewest votes to save	Francisco V Fewest votes to save	Rossana; Fewest votes to save	Eduardo; 53.16% to win		

=== Notes ===
- ^Note 1 : Unbeknownst to the House, Daniel is not a real Housemate and is acting as the Audience's Player. In order to hide this fact from the other Housemates, Big Brother named Daniel the Head of Household. As a result, he could not nominate or be nominated. On Day 11, the public was given the option to make the Audience's Player, Daniel a full Housemate. The alternative was to allow Eduardo, one of the secret Housemates, to become a Housemate. With 61%, Eduardo was chosen, meaning Daniel had to leave the House.
- ^Note 2 : Housemates nominated face-to-face this week. The public voted on the Big Brother App on who should be nominated this week. Ana received the most votes but was already nominated. Jimena received the next highest number of votes and now faces the public vote as well.
- ^Note 3 : Germán won the power to save someone from nominations. He chose to save Eduardo. In addition, he was allowed to nominate two additional people for eviction. He chose Israel and Martha.
- ^Note 4 : Francisco M and Eduardo was directly nominated by Big Brother for breaking a house rule.
- ^Note 5 : The public voted on the Big Brother App on who should be nominated this week. Lilian received the most votes and she was nominated.
- ^Note 6 : Andrew nominated replacing Francisco V. The singer Yuri nominated 3-Francisco V, 2-Germán, 1-Rossana replace Luís.
- ^Note 7 : Vera nominated 3-Sandra, 2-Francisco V, 1-Eduardo replace Luís.
- ^Note 8 : Ana and Sandra were directly nominated by Big Brother for breaking a house rule.
- ^Note 9 : At the final week, the public voted for the winner.
