= Jorge Kahwagi =

Mexican businessman, politician and show business personality (1958–2026)

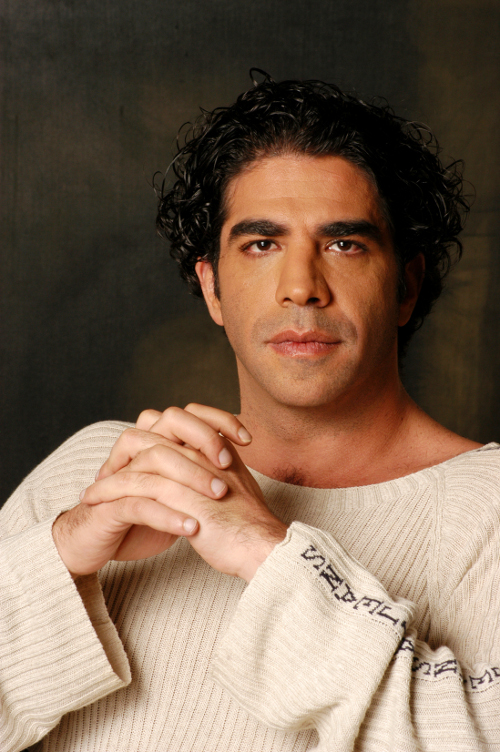

Personal information
- Born: Jorge Antonio Kahwagi Macari; 28 May 1968 Mexico City, Mexico
- Died: 30 September 2026 (aged 58)
- Height: 5 ft 10 in (178 cm)

President of New Alliance Party
- In office 28 August 2007 – 30 June 2011
- Preceded by: Tomás Ruiz González
- Succeeded by: Luis Castro Obregón

Deputy of the Congress of Mexico
- In office 1 September 2003 – 19 May 2004
- Constituency: Proportional representation
- In office 15 July 2004 – 31 August 2006
- Constituency: Proportional representation
- In office 1 September 2009 – 31 August 2012
- Constituency: Proportional representation

Personal details
- Party: New Alliance Party (2007–2018)
- Other political affiliations: Ecologist Green Party of Mexico (2001–2026)

Boxing career
- Reach: 73 in (184 cm)

Boxing record
- Total fights: 12
- Wins: 12
- Win by KO: 12
- Losses: 0
- Draws: 0

Jorge Antonio Kahwagi Macari (Note: In this Mexican name, the surname is Kahwagi and the second or maternal family name is Macari.) (Spanish pronunciation: [ˈxoɾxe kaˈwatʃi]; 28 May 1968 – 30 September 2026) was a Mexican businessman, politician, professional boxer and media personality.

As a boxer, he won 12 fights by knockout and remained undefeated. As a politician, he served as a member of the Chamber of Deputies and as president of the New Alliance Party (PANAL). He also appeared on Big Brother México, where he finished in third place.

== Early life ==
Jorge Antonio Kahwagi Macari was born in Mexico City, Mexico on 28 May 1968. He was the son of businessman Jorge Kahwagi Gastine and Sonja Macari Chalhub, and was part of a family of Lebanese origin established in Mexico.

He studied business administration of Universidad Iberoamericana and received his law degree from the National Autonomous University of Mexico (UNAM).

Kahwagi was the vice president for the tabloid newspaper La Crónica de Hoy, which belonged to his father.

== Career ==
=== Boxing ===
Kahwagi debuted professionally in the sport on 10 December 2001, knocking out newcomer Perry Williams in the first round, and ended his career in 2015 after establishing an undefeated record of 12 wins, all fights by knockout. Kahwagi is infamous amongst boxing fans for charges of manipulated fights, which increased significantly after the knockouts against boxers Roberto José Coelho in 2005 and against Ramon Alejandro Olivas on 11 September 2015, and became one of the reasons explaining his withdrawal from the sport. His fight against Olivas has been called "one of the most infamous fiascos in recent boxing history".

== Politics ==
Kahwagi was a member of the Ecologist Green Party of Mexico (PVEM) political party.

In 2006, he left the PVEM and joined the New Alliance Party (PANAL). He became president of the party, and also served as a deputy.

=== Media ===
Kahwagi asked to be excused from his seat in Congress in order to be a contestant on Big Brother México for Big Brother VIP 3 (Part 2). He was in the house for the full 50 days and ended up finishing in third place.

== Personal life and death ==
Kahwagi was engaged to Mexican actress Marlene Favela in 2009.

Kahwagi died on 30 September 2026, at the age of 58.
