= Big Brother México =

- International logo of Big Brother
- Genre: Entertainment; Reality television
- Created by: John de Mol Jr. Endemol
- Based on: Nineteen Eighty-Four by George Orwell
- Developed by: John de Mol Jr. Endemol
- Presented by: Adela Micha (Season 1, 2); Víctor Trujillo (Season VIP 1); Verónica Castro (Season 3, Season VIP 2, 3.1, 3.2, 4)
- Country of origin: Mexico
- Original language: Spanish
- No. of seasons: 9 (4 regular + 5 VIP edition)

Production
- Producer: Pedro Torres

Original release
- Release: March 3, 2002 – December 17, 2015

Big Brother México is a reality television series based on the international Big Brother format produced in the Netherlands by Endemol. Big Brother México was launched by Televisa in 2002. Before its debut, the idea of being watched twenty-four hours a day by a camera was shocking to some in Mexican society. The series was successful, and it was followed by a special edition called Big Brother VIP with Mexican celebrities from show business and even politics.

Congressman Jorge Kahwagi, minority whip of the Mexican Green Party in the Chamber of Deputies of Mexico's Congress, shocked and angered many people in Mexico when he asked to be excused from his post in Congress to be sequestered for months inside the Big Brother House. Critics among colleagues and the general public accused him of dereliction of duty, discrediting his office, and seeking personal gain. During the show, late-night variety-show host, comedian, and producer Adal Ramones, also from Televisa, made a send-up of Big Brother which he called "El Gran Carnal" or "Big Bro" in Mexican slang.

The show had returned after 10 years off the air on SKY and Canal 5, with a fourth season premiered on September 21, 2015. In 2023, the fifth celebrity season was ordered, titled La casa de los famosos México which premiered on June 4, 2023 on Las Estrellas.

== Series details ==
Big Brother

| Season | Launch Date | Finale Date | Housemates | Days | Winner | Host |
|---|---|---|---|---|---|---|
| Big Brother 1 | 3 March 2002 | 16 June 2002 | 12 | 106 | Rocío Cárdenas | Adela Micha |
| Big Brother 2 | 2 March 2003 | 29 June 2003 | 15 | 120 | Silvia Irabien | Adela Micha |
| Big Brother 3 | 27 February 2005 | 27 April 2005 | 19 | 60 | Evelyn Nieto | Verónica Castro |
| Big Brother 4 | 21 September 2015 | 17 December 2015 | 16 | 87 | Eduardo Miranda | Adela Micha |

Big Brother VIP

| Season | Launch Date | Finale Date | Housemates | Days | Winner | Host |
|---|---|---|---|---|---|---|
| Big Brother VIP 1 | 30 June 2002 | 28 July 2002 | 11 | 29 | Galilea Montijo | Víctor Trujillo |
| Big Brother VIP 2 | 28 September 2003 | 30 November 2003 | 14 | 65 | Omar Chaparro | Verónica Castro |
| Big Brother VIP 3.1 | March 14, 2004 | 16 May 2004 | 16 | 64 | Eduardo Videgaray | Verónica Castro |
| Big Brother VIP 3.2 | May 16, 2004 | 4 July 2004 | 18 | 50 | Roxana Castellanos | Verónica Castro |
| Big Brother VIP 4 | May 1, 2005 | 3 July 2005 | 22 | 64 | Sasha Sokol | Verónica Castro |

== Big Brother 1 ==
=== Housemates ===
| Housemates | Residence | Occupation | Age |
|---|---|---|---|
| Azalia Ojeda | Mexico City | Professional | 29 |
| Carla Chávez | Monterrey | Graphic communicator | 32 |
| Denisse Padilla | Guadalajara | Marketing student | 20 |
| Diego Jasso | Monterrey | Communication student | 21 |
| Eduardo Orozco | Guadalajara | Doctor | 34 |
| Eric Aurioles | Cancún | Hotel administration student | 28 |
| Gabriel Pontones | New Jersey, United States | Cinema student | 28 |
| Miguel Ángel Arnáis | Mexico City | Law student | 24 |
| Paola Olivera | Mexico City | Waitressing at Hooters | 26 |
| Patricio Zambrano | Monterrey | Family company employee | 36 |
| Rocío Cárdenas | Monterrey | Professional | 26 |
| Verónica de Ita Payró | Puebla | Singer | 24 |

=== Nominations ===
| | Week 3 | Week 5 | Week 7 | Week 9 | Week 11 | Week 13 | Week 14 | Week 15 | | | Nomination points received |
| | Week 3 | Week 5 | Week 7 | Week 9 | Week 11 | Week 13 | Week 14 | Day 102 | Final | | Nomination points received |
|---|---|---|---|---|---|---|---|---|---|---|---|
| Rocío | Azalia; Denisse | Diego; Azalia | Paola; Azalia | Paola; Miguel A. | Miguel A. Gabriel | Gabriel; Verónica | Gabriel; Eric | Gabriel; Eric | Winner (Day 106) | | 22 |
| Gabriel | Verónica; Eduardo | Verónica; Diego | Patricio; Carla | Eduardo; Verónica | Patricio; Verónica | Verónica; Patricio | Rocío; Eduardo | Rocío; Patricio | Runner-up (Day 106) | | 31 |
| Eric | Diego; Rocío | Diego; Miguel A. | Azalia; Miguel A. | Paolo; Miguel A. | Miguel A. Verónica | Patricio; Eduardo | Eduardo; Patricio | Patricio; Gabriel | Third place (Day 106) | | 19 |
| Carla | Denisse; Diego | Azalia; Diego | Azalia; Verónica | Patricio; Verónica | Miguel A. Verónica | Gabriel; Verónica | Gabriel; Patricio | Patricio; Gabriel | Fourth place (Day 106) | | 8 |
| Patricio | Denisse; Azalia | Miguel A. Diego | Gabriel; Azalia | Paola; Gabriel | Miguel A. Gabriel | Eduardo; Verónica | Eduardo; Gabriel | Rocío; Eric | Evicted (Day 102) | | 22 |
| Eduardo | Miguel A. Gabriel | Miguel A. Diego | Azalia; Gabriel | Gabriel; Paola | Gabriel; Verónica | Gabriel; Verónica | Gabriel; Rocío | Evicted (Day 95) | | | 13 |
| Verónica | Paola; Rocío | Diego; Rocío | Azalia; Paola | Paola; Gabriel | Eric; Gabriel | Eric; Gabriel | Evicted (Day 88) | | | | 20 |
| Miguel A. | Denisse; Eduardo | Eric; Rocío | Eric; Patricio | Eric; Carla | Eric; Patricio | Evicted (Day 74) | | | | | 18 |
| Paola | Carla; Verónica | Rocío; Patricio | Rocío; Eric | Patricio; Eric | Evicted (Day 60) | | | | | | 10 |
| Azalia | Carla; Eduardo | Rocío; Eric | Rocío; Eric | Evicted (Day 46) | | | | | | | 16 |
| Diego | Rocío; Denisse | Verónica; Rocío | Evicted (Day 32) | | | | | | | | 13 |
| Denisse | Carla; Patricio | Evicted (Day 18) | | | | | | | | | 8 |
| Notes | none | | | | | | none | | | | |
| Nominated | Carla, Denisse | Diego, Rocío | Azalia, Eric, Rocío | Gabriel; Paola, Patricio | Gabriel, Miguel A. | Carla, Gabriel, Rocío, Verónica | Eduardo, Gabriel | Gabriel, Patricio, Rocío | Carla, Gabriel, Eric, Rocío | | |
| Evicted | Denisse; 62.70% to evict | Diego; 66.73% to evict | Azalia; 83.64% to evict | Paola; 56.02% to evict | Miguel A. 60.48% to evict | Verónica; 66.27% to evict | Eduardo; 56.35% to evict | Patricio; 50.71% to evict | Carla; 17.13% to win | Eric; 18.88% to win | |
| Evicted | Denisse; 62.70% to evict | Diego; 66.73% to evict | Azalia; 83.64% to evict | Paola; 56.02% to evict | Miguel A. 60.48% to evict | Verónica; 66.27% to evict | Eduardo; 56.35% to evict | Patricio; 50.71% to evict | Gabriel; 31.52% to win | | |
| Survived | Carla; 37.30% | Rocío; 33.27% | Rocío; 12.86% Eric; 3.50% | Patricio; 26.54% Gabriel; 17.54% | Gabriel; 39.52% | Gabriel; 19.92% Carla; 8.18% Rocío; 5.63% | Gabriel; 43.65% | Gabriel; 34.00% Rocío; 15.29% | Rocío; 32.47% to win | | |

Notes:

- ^1 Carla and Rocío were automatically nominated by Big Brother for discussing nominations.
- ^2 Now, the audience had to vote for which housemate they would like to win the grand prize.

== Big Brother VIP 1 ==
=== Housemates ===
| Housemates | Residence | Age | Famous for... |
|---|---|---|---|
| Erick Ibarra Miramontes, "Alan" | Mexico City | 44 | Singer and actor |
| Alejandro Ibarra | Mexico City | 44 | Actor |
| Arath de la Torre | Cancún, Quintana Roo | 42 | Actor |
| Arleth Terán | Ciudad Victoria, Tamaulipas | 40 | Actress |
| Facundo Gómez | Mexico City | 39 | TV presenter |
| Galilea Montijo | Guadalajara, Jalisco | 29 | Actress and TV presenter |
| Laisha Wilkins | Mexico City | 41 | Actress |
| Lorena Herrera | Mazatlán, Sinaloa | 50 | Actress, singer and model |
| Luis Gatica | Veracruz | 56 | Actor |
| Nailea Norvind | Mexico City | 47 | Actress |
| Víctor Noriega | Mexico City | 45 | Singer, actor and model |

=== Nominations ===
| | Week 1 | Week 2 | Week 3 | Week 4 | | | Nomination points received |
| | Week 1 | Week 2 | Week 3 | Day 22 | Final | | Nomination points received |
|---|---|---|---|---|---|---|---|
| Galilea | Víctor; Facundo; Nailea | Nailea; Facundo; Aath | Arath; Facundo; Alejandro | Arleth; Facundo; Alejandro | Winner (Day 29) | | 16 |
| Facundo | Nailea; Laisha; Arath | Nailea; Alan; Galilea | Arleth; Alan; Alejandro | Alejandro; Arleth; Arath | Runner-up (Day 29) | | 27 |
| Arath | Víctor; Nailea; Luis | Lorena; Nailea; Facundo | Lorena; Facundo; Alejandro | Alejandro; Arleth; Facundo | Third place (Day 29) | | 18 |
| Alejandro | Laisha; Nailea; Víctor | Laisha; Alan; Galilea | Arath; Alan; Facundo | Arath; Galilea; Arleth | Evicted (Day 26) | | 22 |
| Arleth | Galilea; Facundo; Lorena | Galilea; Facundo; Alejandro | Lorena; Galilea; Alejandro | Alejandro; Arath; Facundo | Evicted (Day 26) | | 16 |
| Lorena | Nailea; Luis; Laisha | Nailea; Laisha; Lorena | Arleth; Alejandro; Facundo | Evicted (Day 22) | | | 19 |
| Alan | Luis; Arath; Nailea | Lorena; Arath; Alejandro | Facundo; Lorena; Galilea | Evicted (Day 22) | | | 9 |
| Nailea | Luis; Galilea; Alejandro | Glailea; Facundo; Alejandro | Evicted (Day 15) | | | | 27 |
| Laisha | Nailea; Alejandro; Arath | Lorena; Laisha; Nailea | Evicted (Day 15) | | | | 13 |
| Víctor | Facundo; Arleth; Galilea | Evicted (Day 8) | | | | | 10 |
| Luis | Víctor; Luis; Alan | Evicted (Day 8) | | | | | 11 |
| Nominated For Eviction | Luis, Nailea, Víctor | Laisha, Lorena, Nailea | Alan, Facundo, Lorena | Alejandro, Arath, Arleth | Arath, Facundo, Galilea | | |
| Evicted | Luis; 17.92% to save | Nailea; 21.61% to save | Alan; 17.70% to save | Arleth; 9.23% to save | Arath; 8.19% to win | Facundo; 25.38% to win | |
| Evicted | Víctor; 20.32% to save | Laisha; 27.84% to save | Lorena; 28.13% to save | Alejandro; 24.72% to save | Galilea; 66.43% to win | | |

== Big Brother 2 ==
=== Housemates ===
| Housemates | Residence | Occupation | Age |
|---|---|---|---|
| Alejandro Solís | Mérida, Yucatán | Businessman | 42 |
| Alfonso "Poncho" de Nigris | Monterrey, Nuevo León | Model | 26 |
| Ana Marcela Tourné | Mexico City | Saleswoman of cars | 28 |
| Carolina Rincón | Navojoa, Sonora | Acting Student | 19 |
| Eduardo Enrikez | Mexico City | Actor | 27 |
| Mauricio Buendía | Tecamac, Estado de México | Bricklayer | 28 |
| Óscar Ruiz D'Azua | Mexico City | Race car driver | 32 |
| Raquel Arroyo | Guadalajara, Jalisco | Lawyer | 43 |
| Rodrigo Gómez | Mexico City | Publicity worker | 28 |
| Sabina Bautista | Monterrey, Nuevo León | Publicity worker | 34 |
| Silvia Irabien | Mérida, Yucatán | Bar tender, bikini business | 29 |
| Tatiana Rodríguez | Ciudad del Carmen, Campeche | Acting student | 22 |
| Antonio José MacFarland, "Tony" | Puebla | Father's company employee | 20 |
| Vanessa Aguilar | Celaya, Guanajuato | Public Relations | 25 |
| Wendy Paola Arellano | Tepic, Nayarit | Worker | 23 |

=== Nominations ===
| | Week 2 | Week 4 | Week 6 | Week 8 | Week 10 | Week 12 | Week 13 | Week 14 | Week 15 | Week 16 | Week 17 | |
|---|---|---|---|---|---|---|---|---|---|---|---|---|
| Silvia | No; Nominations | Mauricio, Óscar | Muricio, Alejandro | Vanessa, Rodrigio | Alfonso, Raquel | Tony, Alfonso | Alfonso, Tony | Vanessa, Alfonso | Tony, Raquel | 3:Alfonso, 2:Tony, 1:Eduardo | Winner (Day 120) | |
| Tony | No; Nominations | Raquel, Wendy | Wendy, Raquel | Tatiana, Wendy | Wendy, Raquel | Silvia, Tatiana | Mauricio, Silvia | Raquel, Eduardo | Eduardo, Raquel | 3:Silvia, 2:Eduardo, 1:Alfonso | Runner-up (Day 120) | |
| Alfonso | No; Nominations | Raquel, Óscar | Alejandro, Raquel | Rodrigio, Vanessa | Tatiana, Wendy | Silvia | Mauricio, Silvia | Silvia, Eduardo | Exempt | 3:Eduardo, 2:Silvia, 1:Tony | Third place (Day 120) | |
| Eduardo | Not In; House | | | Tatiana, Mauricio | Tatiana | Tatiana, Mauricio | Mauricio, Silvia | Vanessa, Silvia | Raquel, Tony | 3:Alfonso, 2:Tony, 1:Silvia | Evicted (Day 117) | |
| Raquel | No; Nominations | Óscar, Mauricio | Mauricio, Wendy | Rodrigio, Tony | Tony, Wendy | Tony, Mauricio | Mauricio, Tony | Vanessa, Tony | Eduardo, Tony | Evicted (Day 112) | | |
| Vanessa | No; Nominations | Silvia, Tatiana | Wendy, Tatiana | Wendy, Tatiana | Wendy, Silvia | Tatiana, Mauricio | Mauricio, Silvia | Silvia, Tony | Evicted (Day 105) | | | |
| Mauricio | No; Nominations | Silvia, Raquel | Alejandro, Silvia | Raquel, Tatiana | Wendy, Raquel | Raquel, Eduardo | Raquel, Alfonso | Evicted (Day 98) | | | | |
| Tatiana | No; Nominations | Alejandro, Óscar | Wendy, Alejandro | Vanessa, Rodrigio | Alfonso, Tony | Silvia | Evicted (Day 86) | | | | | |
| Wendy | No; Nominations | Óscar, Raquel | Alejandro, Raquel | Vanessa, Rodrigio | Alfonso, Tony | Evicted (Day 77) | | | | | | |
| Rodrigo | No; Nominations | Mauricio, Raquel | Wendy, Alejandro | Alfonso, Tatiana | Evicted (Day 63) | | | | | | | |
| Ana | Not In; House | | | Vanessa, Tony | Walked (Day 54) | | | | | | | |
| Alejandro | No; Nominations | Óscar, Mauricio | Wendy, Mauricio | Evicted (Day 49) | | | | | | | | |
| Sabina | Head of the Household | Mauricio, Alejandro | Walked (Day 32) | | | | | | | | | |
| Óscar | No; Nominations | Silvia, Raquel | Evicted (Day 25) | | | | | | | | | |
| Carolina | No; Nominations | Evicted (Day 13) | | | | | | | | | | |
| Notes | | - | - | | | | | | | | | |
| Nominated For Eviction | Alejandro, Carolina | Mauricio, Óscar, Raquel | Alejandro, Wendy | Rodrigio, Vanessa | Tatiana, Wendy | Silvia, Tatiana | Eduardo, Maricio | Alfonso, Silvia, Vanessa | Eduardo, Raquel, Tony | Alfonso, Eduardo, Silvia | Alfonso, Siliva, Tony | |
| Evicted | Carolina; 60.32% to evict | Óscar; 46.64% to evict | Alejandro; 42.42% to save | Rodrigio; 45.41% to save | Wendy; 27.23% to save | Tatiana; 48.76% to save | Mauricio; 46.45% to save | Vanessa; 20.43% to save | Raquel; 15.10% to save | Eduardo; 11.85% to save | Alfonso; 10.71% to win | Tony; 35.65% to win |
| Evicted | Carolina; 60.32% to evict | Óscar; 46.64% to evict | Alejandro; 42.42% to save | Rodrigio; 45.41% to save | Wendy; 27.23% to save | Tatiana; 48.76% to save | Mauricio; 46.45% to save | Vanessa; 20.43% to save | Raquel; 15.10% to save | Eduardo; 11.85% to save | Alfonso; 10.71% to win | Silvia; 53.54% to win |

Notes:
^2 This Week there were no Nominations. Instead, Sabina won Head of Household and initially Nominated Alejandro and Óscar for Eviction, but Óscar's Nomination was Vetoed by Power of Veto winner Rodrigio, and Carolina was put up in his place.
^3 This Week Alfonso, Eduardo, Mauricio, Raquel, Rodrigio and Wendy were able to be nominated for 4 Points and 2 Points, instead of the usual 2 Points and 1 Point after winning a challenge.
^4 This Week the Housemate with the highest number of Nomination Points (Wendy) was Nominated and Eduardo, who was serving time in Gran Hermano Ecuador (Ecuador's version of Big Brother) Nominated one Housemate to join them - choosing Tatiana.
^5 Tatiana received the most Nominations and faced the Public Vote. After this Alfonso and Tatiana (challenge winners) had to choose the second Nominee, and chose Silvia.
^6 Mauricio received the most Nomination Points and was Nominated. This Week there were 2 groups; the first being Alfonso, Mauricio, Raquel and Silvia and the second Eduardo, Tony and Vanessa. The second group lost the competition and had to Nominate one member of their own group to join Mauricio, and they chose Eduardo.
^7 Silvia & Vanessa, the 2 nominated Housemates, had to nominate the third Housemate to be up for eviction, and they chose Alfonso.
^8 Alfonso won immunity so he couldn't nominate or be nominated.
^9 This Week the remaining four Housemates had to rank the other three Housemates in order of preference - their least favourite receiving three points, their next least favourite receiving two points and their favourite receiving just one point.
^10 All remaining Housemates face the vote to win.

== Big Brother VIP 2 ==
=== Housemates ===
| Housemates | Residence | Occupation | Age |
|---|---|---|---|
| Adrián Uribe | Mexico City | Actor and comedian | 45 |
| Jorge van Rankin, "El Burro" | Mexico City | Radio presenter | 54 |
| Gabriela Platas | Naucalpan | Actress | 43 |
| Isabel Madow | Mexico City | Model | 44 |
| José Luis Reséndez | Monterrey, Nuevo León | Model and actor | 39 |
| Karla Álvarez (†) | Mexico City | Actress | 41 |
| Marintia Escobedo | Mexico City | Journalist and TV presenter | 57 |
| Michelle Vieth | Marshalltown, Iowa | Actress | 37 |
| Omar Chaparro | Chihuahua, Chihuahua | Radio and TV presenter | 42 |
| Roberto Palazuelos | Acapulco, Guerrero | Actor | 50 |
| Jorge Arce, "El Travieso" | Los Mochis, Sinaloa | Boxer | 38 |
| Vica Andrade | San José, Costa Rica | TV presenter | 45 |
| Yolanda Andrade | Culiacán, Sinaloa | Actress and TV presenter | 46 |
| Yordi Rosado | Mexico City | Radio and TV presenter | 46 |

=== Nominations ===
| | Week 1 | Week 2 | Week 3 | Week 4 | Week 5 | Week 6 | Week 7 | Week 8 | | Week 9 | | |
| | Week 1 | Week 2 | Week 3 | Week 4 | Week 5 | Week 6 | Week 7 | Day 50 | Day 53 | Day 57 | Finale | |
|---|---|---|---|---|---|---|---|---|---|---|---|---|
| Omar | Michelle, Marintia | José Luis, Gabriela | José Luis, Gabriela | Michelle, Karla | Gabriela, Roberto | Karla, Yordi | Yolanda, Travieso | Karla, Yordi, Travieso | Karla (5), Travieso (3), Yordi (2) | Yordi (4), Adrián (3), Travieso (3) | Winner (Day 64) | |
| Yolanda | Vica, Michelleu | Vica, José Luis | José Luis, Yordi | Vica, Adrián | Omar, Adrián | Omar, Burro | Adrián, Omar | Vica, Adrián, Omar | Adrián (3), Travieso (3), Yordi (1) | Yordi (4), Adrián (3), Travieso (3) | Runner-up (Day 64) | |
| Travieso | Isabel, Marintia | Isabel, José Luis | José Luis, Vica | Michelle, Vica | Adrián, Roberto | Omar, Adrián | Roberto, Adrián | Vica, Omar, Adrián | Adrián (5), Omar (4), Karla (3) | Yordi (8), Omar (1), Yolanda (1) | Third place (Day 64) | |
| Adrián | Roberto, Isabel | Travieso, Isabel | José Luis, Roberto | Michelle, Travieso | Roberto, Gabriela | Karla, Travieso | Travieso, Yolanda | Karla, Travieso, Yordi | Karla (4), Travieso (3), Yordi (1) | Yordi (8), Omar (1), Yolanda (1) | Fourth place (Day 64) | |
| Yordi | Michelle, Marintia | Isabel, Vica | Roberto, Travieso | Roberto, Michelle | Roberto, Omar | Burro, Omar | Omar, Yolanda | Vica, Omar, Adrián | Adrián (5), Omar (5), Travieso (2) | Adrián (2), Omar (2), Travieso (1) | Evicted (Day 60) | |
| Karla | Isabel, Marintia | Isabel, Vica | Travieso, Roberto | Vica, Travieso | Roberto, Omar | Omar, Vica | Omar, Travieso | Vica, Adrián, Omar | Adrián (4), Omar (4), Yordi (3) | Evicted (Day 57) | | |
| Vica | Michelle, Marintia | Karla, Travieso | Karla, Gabriela | Roberto, Karla | Roberto, Yordi | Yolanda, Karla | Karla, Yolanda | Karla, Travieso, Yolanda | Evicted (Day 53) | | | |
| Roberto | Marintia, Michelle | José Luis, Travieso | José Luis, Michelle | Vica, Michelle | Gabriela, Yordi | Karla, Yordi | Yordi, Karla | Evicted (Day 50) | | | | |
| Burro | Marintia, Michelle | Travieso, Michelle | Travieso, José Luis | Michelle, Yordi | Gabriela, Yordi | Adrián, Yordi | Evicted (Day 43) | | | | | |
| Gabriela | Isabel, Travieso | Isabel, Roberto | Travieso, Vica | Roberto, Burro | Roberto, Omar | Evicted (Day 36) | | | | | | |
| Michelle | Marintia, Isabel | Yolanda, Omar | Roberto, Travieso | Burro, Karla | Evicted (Day 29) | | | | | | | |
| José Luis | Roberto, Travieso | Travieso, Roberto | Travieso, Roberto | Evicted (Day 22) | | | | | | | | |
| Isabel | Roberto, Michelle | Gabriela, Travieso | Evicted (Day 15) | | | | | | | | | |
| Marintia | Michelle, Travieso | Evicted (Day 8) | | | | | | | | | | |
| Notes | - | - | 11 | 12 | 13 | 14 | 15 | 16 | 17 | 18 | 19 | |
| Nominated For Eviction | Marintia, Michelle | Isabel, Travieso | José Luis, Travieso | Michelle, Vica | Gabriela, Roberto, Travieso | Adrián, Burro, Karla, Yordi | Omar, Roberto, Yolanda | Adrián, Karla, Omar, Vica | Adrián, Karla, Omar | Adrián, Travieso, Yordi | Adrián, Omar, Travieso, Yolanda | |
| Evicted | Marintia; 23.08% to save | Isabel; 29.52% to save | José Luis; 14.47% to save | Michelle; 48.45% to save | Gabriela; 13.09% to save | Burro; 20.45% to save | Roberto; 15.59% to save | Vica; 8.89% to save | Karla; 10.99% to save | Yordi; 26.77% to save | Adrián; 3.71% to win | Travieso; 10.35% to win |
| Evicted | Marintia; 23.08% to save | Isabel; 29.52% to save | José Luis; 14.47% to save | Michelle; 48.45% to save | Gabriela; 13.09% to save | Burro; 20.45% to save | Roberto; 15.59% to save | Vica; 8.89% to save | Karla; 10.99% to save | Yordi; 26.77% to save | Yolanda; 21.60% to win | Omar; 64.45% to win |

Notes:
^11José Luis received the most nominations and had to choose the 2nd Nominee, and chose Travieso.
^12Gabriela & Roberto received the most votes and had to choose the 3rd nominee, they chose Travieso.
^13Omar received immunity from Aída who was part of an exchange from Gran Hermano Spain.
^14Adrián, Burro, Karla Omar & Yordi are initially nominated for eviction but the public voted to save one of the nominees. With 71.56% of the vote Omar was saved, to Yordi's 9.73%, Burro's 7.78%, Karla's 6.23% and Adrián 4.70%. Therefore, Adrián, Borru, Karla and Yordi (not saved by the Public) will all face the Public Vote this Week.
^15 Omar and Yolanda were initially Nominated. Vica and Yordi won a competition and they had to choose the 3rd nominee, choosing Roberto.
^16 This Week Housemates Nominated for 3, 2 and 1 Points instead of the usual 2 & 1.
^17 Nomination points were won in a task. Adrián won 8 points, Karla won 11 points, Omar won 10 points, Travieso won 12 points, Yolanda won 7 points and Yordi won 12 points. They distributed them as stated above.
^18 This Week Housemates competed for Points again, but this time four of them were in teams of two. Adrián and Travieso won 10 Points (and Nominated together), Omar and Yolanda also won 10, and Nominated together. Yordi Nominated alone, with the 5 Points they won.
^19 All Housemates remaining automatically face the vote to win.

== Big Brother VIP 3 (Part 1) ==
=== Housemates ===
| Housemates | Residence | Famous for... | Age |
|---|---|---|---|
| Jorge van Rankin, "El Burro" | Mexico City | Radio host/BB VIP 2 contestant | 55 |
| Carlos Eduardo Rico | Mexico City | Actor | 46 |
| Claudia Lizaldi | Mexico City | TV presenter | 39 |
| Eduardo Videgaray | Mexico City | Radio and TV presenter | 48 |
| Elizabeth Álvarez | Mexico City | Actress | 40 |
| Fabián Lavalle | Mexico City | TV presenter | 58 |
| Johnny Lozada | Caguas, Puerto Rico | Singer and actor | 49 |
| José Manuel Figueroa | Juliantla, Guerrero | Singer | 42 |
| Juan José Ulloa | Mexico City | TV presenter | 39 |
| Julio Camejo | La Habana, Cuba | Actor and singer | 40 |
| Luz Elena González | Guadalajara, Jalisco | Model and actress | 43 |
| Manola Díez | Monterrey, Nuevo León | Actress | 43 |
| Mercedes Moltó | Panama | Actress | 43 |
| Ninel Conde | Toluca | Singer and actress | 43 |
| Reynaldo Rossano | México, D.F. | TV presenter | 43 |
| Roxana Martínez | México, D.F. | Actress and singer | 45 |

=== Nominations ===
| | Week 1 | Week 2 | Week 3 | | Week 4 | Week 5 | Week 6 | Week 7 | | Week 8 | | Week 9 | | |
| | Week 1 | Week 2 | Day 15 | Day 18 | Week 4 | Week 5 | Week 6 | Day 43 | Day 46 | Day 50 | Day 53 | Day 57 | Final | |
|---|---|---|---|---|---|---|---|---|---|---|---|---|---|---|
| Eduardo | Fabián; Julio | Fabián; Juan José | Ninel; Fabián | (2)Manola (2)Julio | Julio; Luz Elena | Fabián; José Manuel | Ninel Fabián | (3)Fabián (2)Manola | ? ? | Juan José(4); Fabián(1); Manola(1) | (3)Manola (2)Fabián (1)Mercedes | ? ? | Winner (Day 64) | |
| Claudia | Carlos; Roxana | Mercedes; Elizabeth | Fabián; José Manuel | (2)Mercedes (2)Johnny | Mercedes Manola | José Manuel; Reynaldo | Ninel; Luz Elena | (2)Burro (2)Eduardo (1)Luz Elena | ? ? | Fabián(1); Juan José(2); Mercedes(3) | (3)Mercedes (2)Fabián (1)Manola | ? ? | Runner-up (Day 64) | |
| Mercedes | Claudia; Manola | Claudia; José Manuel | Johnny; José Manuel | (2)Manola (2)Claudia | Burro; Manola | José Manuel; Burro | Claudia; Luz Elena | (2)Juan José (2)Reynaldo (1)Manola | ? ? | Burro(3); Claudia(1); Eduardo(2) | (3)Claudia (2)Burro (1)Eduardo | (2)Fabián (2)Mercedes (1)Eduardo | Third place (Day 64) | |
| Burro | Not in house | | | | Mercedes; Julio | Mercedes; Luz Elena | Ninel Manola | (3)Claudia (2)Eduardo | ? ? | Mercedes(3); Juan José(3); Fabián(1) | (3)Mercedes (2)Manola (1)Fabián | ? ? | Fourth place (Day 64) | |
| Fabián | Luz Elena; Johnny | Claudia; Manola | Eduardo; Mercedes | Claudia; Mercedes | Eduardo; Manola | Eduardo; José Manuel | Claudia; Luz Elena | (3)Juan José (2)Mercedes | ? ? | Eduardo(2); Claudia(2); Burro(2) | (3)Eduardo (2)Burro (1)Claudia | ? ? | Evicted (Day 60) | |
| Manola | Roxana; Mercedes | Julio; Carlos | Fabián ? | (3)Mercedes (1)Reynaldo | Mercedes; Juan José | Eduardo; Burro | Luz Elena; Claudia | (4)Fabián (1)Juan José | ? ? | Eduardo(1); Claudia(2); Burro(5) | (3)Burro (2)Eduardo (1)Claudia | Evicted (Day 57) | | |
| Juan José | Luz Elena; Roxana | Luz Elena; Ninel | Manola; Ninel | (3)Luz Elena (1)José Manuel | Manola; Eduardo | José Manuel; Luz Elena | Luz Elena; Mercedes | (3)Fabián (2)Manola | ? ? | Burro(3); Eduardo(1); Claudia(4) | Evicted (Day 53) | | | |
| Luz Elena | Roxana; Johnny | José Manuel; Ninel | Juan José; Eduardo | José Manuel Johnny | Burro; Julio | (3)Burro (2)José Manuel | Ninel; Manola | (2)Claudia (2)Eduardo (1)Burro | ? ? | Evicted (Day 50) | | | | |
| Reynaldo | Johnny; Roxana | Elizabeth; Julio | Elizabeth; Julio | Julio; Manola | Luz Elena; Manola | José Manuel; Claudia | Luz Elena; Manola | (3)Luz Elena (2)Claudia | Evicted (Day 46) | | | | | |
| Ninel | Elizabeth; Eduardo | Claudia; Carlos | Elizabeth ? | Johnny; Julio | Manola; Julio | (3)Eduardo (1)Claudia | Luz Elena; Claudia | Evicted (Day 43) | | | | | | |
| José Manuel | Mercedes; Carlos | Mercedes; Luz Elena | Elizabeth; Luz Elena | Johnny; Mercedes | Julio Mercedes | Claudia; Eduardo | Evicted (Day 36) | | | | | | | |
| Julio | Roxana; Manola | Manola; Luz Elena | ? ? | José Manuel Eduardo | Manola; Burro | Evicted (Day 29) | | | | | | | | |
| Johnny | Roxana; Carlos | Carlos; Elizabeth | Elizabeth Ninel | (2)José Manuel (2)Manola | Evicted (Day 22) | | | | | | | | | |
| Elizabeth | Johnny; Roxana | Claudia; Carlos | José Manuel; Reynaldo | Evicted (Day 18) | | | | | | | | | | |
| Carlos | Roxana; Johnny | Elizabeth; Juan José | Evicted (Day 15) | | | | | | | | | | | |
| Roxana | Julio; Manola | Evicted (Day 8) | | | | | | | | | | | | |
| Notes | - | | | - | 12 | 13 | 14 | 15 | 16 | 17 | | - | | - | |
| Nominated for eviction | Johnny; Roxana | Carlos; Claudia | Elizabeth; Fabián | Johnny; José Manuel; Manola; Mercedes | Claudia; Julio; Manola; Mercedes | Eduardo; Fabián; José Manuel | Burro; Luz Elena; Ninel | Claudia; Mercedes; Reynaldo | Burro; Claudia; Luz Elena; Manola | Claudia; Eduardo; Juan José | Burro; Eduardo; Manola | Claudia; Fabián | Burro; Claudia; Eduardo; Mercedes | |
| Evicted | Roxana; 44.89% to save | Carlos; 29.60% to save | Elizabeth; 38.39% to save | Burro; 78.06 to enter | Julio; 19.69% to save | José Manuel; 23.41% to save | Ninel; 32.76% to save | Reynaldo; 26.44% to save | Luz Elena; 17.86% to save | Juan José; 29.43% to save | Manola; 24.96% to save | Fabián; 47.21% to save | Burro; 3.88% to win | Mercedes; 10.92% to win |
| Evicted | Roxana; 44.89% to save | Carlos; 29.60% to save | Elizabeth; 38.39% to save | Johnny; 15.21% to save | Julio; 19.69% to save | José Manuel; 23.41% to save | Ninel; 32.76% to save | Reynaldo; 26.44% to save | Luz Elena; 17.86% to save | Juan José; 29.43% to save | Manola; 24.96% to save | Fabián; 47.21% to save | Claudia; 38.75% to win | Eduardo; 46.45% to win |

==== Notes ====
^1: Elizabeth and Fabián had won a task and they could save one of the nominees and nominate another one. They saved Elizabeth and nominated Carlos

^2: Eduardo and Mercedes won 3 extra points in this round. They choose Fabián

^3: Eduardo, Claudia, Mercedes, Manola, Juan José and Johnny won 1 extra point in this round

^4: Mercedes, Manola and José Manuel choose José Manuel to be immune. Also in this round Mercedes, Manola, José Manuel, Claudia, Reynaldo and Eduardo choose Claudia to have a directly nomination

^5: Gala started with -2 Claudia and -1 MercedesEduardo and José Manuel nominated directly to Fabián

== Big Brother VIP 3 (Part 2) ==
=== Housemates ===
| Housemates | Residence | Famous for... | Age |
|---|---|---|---|
| Carlos Espejel | Mexico City | Actor | 32 |
| Cecilia Gutiérrez | Monterrey, Nuevo León | TV presenter | 32 |
| Érika Zaba | Mexico City | Singer | 25 |
| Fabiola Campomanes | Mexico City | Actress | 30 |
| Héctor Sandarti | Guatemala | TV presenter | 35 |
| Jorge Kahwagi (†) | Mexico City | Politician, businessman and boxer | 36 |
| Juan Carlos Nava | Mexico City | TV presenter and producer | 35 |
| Mariana Ávila | Mexico City | Actress | 25 |
| Martha Julia | Culiacán, Sinaloa | Actress | 31 |
| Mauricio Castillo | Mexico City | Actor and TV presenter | 31 |
| Niurka Marcos | La Habana, Cuba | Actress and dancer | 36 |
| Patricio Borghetti | Buenos Aires, Argentina | Actor and singer | 30 |
| Patricia Muñoz, "Paty" | Mexico City | Singer, actress and model | 36 |
| Alfonso Vera, "Poncho" | Mexico City | Radio and TV presenter | 30 |
| Ramón Cabrer | Mexico City | Model | 23 |
| Roxana Castellanos | Mexico City | Actress and TV presenter | 31 |
| Sergio Mayer | Mexico City | Actor | 38 |
| Sharis Cid | Chihuahua | Actress | 33 |

=== Nominations ===
| | Week 1 | Week 2 | | Week 3 | | Week 4 | | Week 5 | | Week 6 | | Week 7 | | |
| | Week 1 | Day 8 | Day 11 | Day 15 | Day 18 | Day 22 | Day 25 | Day 29 | Day 32 | Day 36 | Day 39 | Day 43 | Final | |
|---|---|---|---|---|---|---|---|---|---|---|---|---|---|---|
| Roxanna | ? ? | ? ? | ? ? | Martha; Mariana | Exempt | (1)Mauricio (1)Héctor (1)Fabiola (1)Martha (1)Poncho | ? ? | (3)? (2)? (1)? | (3)? (2)? (1)? | (3)? (2)? (1)? | (3)? (2)? (1)? | (3)Sergio (1)? | Winner (Day 50) | |
| Sergio | ? ? | ? ? | ? ? | Sharis; Héctor | (3)? (2)? (1)? | (1)Fabiola (1)Martha (1)Mariana (1)Roxanna (1)Paty | Héctor ? | (3)? (2)? (1)? | (3)? (2)? (1)? | (3)? (2)? (1)? | (3)? (2)? (1)? | (3)Roxanna (1)? | Runner-up (Day 50) | |
| Jorge | ? ? | ? ? | No; Nomination | Sharis; Mariana | (3)? (2)? (1)? | (3)Poncho (2)Héctor | Nominated | (3)? (2)? (1)? | (3)? (2)? (1)? | (3)? (2)? (1)? | (3)? (2)? (1)? | (3)Fabiola (1)Roxanna | Third place (Day 50) | |
| Fabiola | ? ? | ? ? | ? ? | Mariana; Martha | Exempt | (2)Poncho (2)Roxanna (1)Paty | Héctor ? | (3)? (2)? (1)? | (3)? (2)? (1)? | (3)? (2)? (1)? | (3)? (2)? (1)? | (3)Héctor (1)Jorge | Fourth place (Day 50) | |
| Héctor | ? ? | ? ? | ? ? | Sharis; Sergio | (3)? (2)? (1)? | (2)Roxanna (2)Jorge (1)Patricio | ? ? | (3)? (2)? (1)? | (3)? (2)? (1)? | (3)? (2)? (1)? | (3)? (2)? (1)? | (3)Sergio (1)Fabiola | Evicted (Day 46) | |
| Paty | Not in House | | | | | (1)Roxanna (1)Fabiola (1)Mariana (1)Martha (1)Héctor | ? ? | (3)? (2)? (1)? | (3)? (2)? (1)? | (3)? (2)? (1)? | (3)? (2)? (1)? | Evicted (Day 43) | | |
| Carlos | ? ? | ? ? | ? ? | Sharis; Héctor | (3)? (2)? (1)? | (1)Fabiola (1)Jorge (1)Sergio (1)Ponchov (1)Roxanna | ? ? | (3)? (2)? (1)? | (3)? (2)? (1)? | (3)? (2)? (1)? | Evicted (Day 39) | | | |
| Patricio | ? ? | ? ? | ? ? | Mariana; Carlos | (3)? (2)? (1)? | (3)Carlos (2)Poncho | Héctor ? | (3)? (2)? (1)? | (3)? (2)? (1)? | (3)? (2)? (1)? | Evicted (Day 36) | | | |
| Martha | ? ? | ? ? | No; Nomination | Sharis; Borrego | Exempt | (3)Roxanna (2)Carlos | Héctor ? | (3)? (2)? (1)? | (3)? (2)? (1)? | (3)? (2)? (1)? | Evicted (Day 36) | | | |
| Mariana | ? ? | ? ? | ? ? | Sharis; Martha | Exempt | (2)Martha (1)Carlos (1)Poncho (1)Roxanna | Héctor ? | (3)? (2)? (1)? | Evicted (Day 32) | | | | | |
| Poncho | ? ? | ? ? | ? ? | Mariana; Martha | (3)? (2)? (1)? | (3)Roxanna (2)Fabiola | Nominated | Evicted (Day 29) | | | | | | |
| Mauricio | ? ? | ? ? | ? ? | Sharis; Jorge | (3)? (2)? (1)? | (2)Roxanna (2)Mariana (1)Carlos | Evicted (Day 25) | | | | | | | |
| Borrego | ? ? | ? ? | ? ? | Sharis; Martha | (3)? (2)? (1)? | Evicted (Day 22) | | | | | | | | |
| Sharis | ? ? | ? ? | ? ? | Mariana; Borrego | Evicted (Day 18) | | | | | | | | | |
| Érika | ? ? | ? ? | ? ? | Evicted (Day 15) | | | | | | | | | | |
| Niurka | ? ? | ? ? | ? ? | Ejected (Day 15) | | | | | | | | | | |
| Cecilia | ? ? | ? ? | Evicted (Day 11) | | | | | | | | | | | |
| Ramón | ? ? | Evicted (Day 8) | | | | | | | | | | | | |
| Notes | 1 | 2 | 3, 4 | 5 | 6, 7 | 8 | 9 | 10 | 11 | 12 | 13 | 14 | 15 | |
| Nominated for eviction | Érika; Niurka; Ramón | Cecilia; Niurka; Sergio | Érika; Patricio; Niurka | Héctor; ~~Mariana~~; Sharis | Borrego; Jorge; Patricio | Mauricio; Patricio; Paty; Sergio | Héctor; Jorge; Poncho | ~~Carlos~~; Héctor; Mariana; Paty; ~~Roxanna~~; Sergio | Martha; Patricio; Paty; Sergio | Carlos; Héctor; Jorge; ~~Roxanna~~ | Fabiola; Jorge; Paty; Sergio | Fabiola; Héctor; Roxanna; Sergio | Fabiola; Jorge; Roxanna; Sergio | |
| Ejected | none | | Niurka | none | | | | | | | | | | |
| Evicted | Ramón; 31.39% to save | Cecilia; 30.95% to save | Érika; 23.73% to save | Sharis; 24.79% to save | Borrego; 13.20% to save | Mauricio; 17.91% to save | Poncho; 11.99% to save | Mariana; 12% to save | Martha; 12.20% to save | Carlos; 32.25% to save | Paty; 9.01% to save | Héctor ?% to save | Fabiola ?% to win | Jorge ?% to win |
| Evicted | Ramón; 31.39% to save | Cecilia; 30.95% to save | Érika; 23.73% to save | Sharis; 24.79% to save | Borrego; 13.20% to save | Mauricio; 17.91% to save | Poncho; 11.99% to save | Mariana; 12% to save | Patricio; 19.48% to save | Carlos; 32.25% to save | Paty; 9.01% to save | Héctor ?% to save | Sergio ?% to win | Roxanna ?% to win |

==== Notes ====
^1: Patricio won a competition and got some privileges. He obtained immunity and chose Borrego to be immune too. Patricio had to choose a 3rd nominee. He chose Niurka.
^2: The Housemates had to nominate in pairs. The pairs were made by chance. Each pair had 8 points to split between a maximum of three Housemates. Carlos & Mariana won a dancing competition and they got some privileges. They obtained immunity. Carlos & Mariana had to choose a third nominee. They chose Sergio.
^3: The Housemates made two teams and played dominos. Each Housemate had to take a tile and give the points of the tile to the Housemates. Martha & Jorge took the double blank tile and did not nominate. Martha & Jorge had to choose a third nominee. They chose Patricio.
^4: Niurka is ejected from the house because she broke the isolation rule of Big Brother.
^5: The Housemates with less points (Fabiola, Mauricio, Patricio, Poncho & Roxanna) had to save one of the Housemates. They saved Mariana. The saved Housemate (Mariana) had to nominate another Housemate. She chose Héctor.
^6: The females were immune from nominating and being nominated. The females had to choose the third nominee. They chose Borrego.
^7: Paty entered the house as a replacement for Niurka.
^8: Each Housemate had five positive points (to save) to split between two nominations at least. They had to choose who they wanted to stay in the house. Mauricio (1), Patricio (1) & Sergio (1) received the fewest votes and are nominated. Roxanna received the most votes and had to choose a fourth nominee. She chose Paty.
^9: The Housemates made two teams and played a competition. The winners were Mariana, Carlos, Martha Julia, Paty, Sergio & Patricio and the losers were Héctor, Poncho, Fabiola, Roxanna & Jorge. The winners had to nominate one of the losers. They chose Poncho. The losers had to nominate one of them. They chose Jorge.
^10: Paty (10), Roxanna (10) & Sergio (9) were initially nominated. Then the winners of the weekly task had to guess who nominated them in order to subtract points from their count. Roxanna was the luckiest and she had 3 points subtracted (10-3=7). Paty (10), Sergio (9), Carlos (8) & Mariana (8) were the revised nominees. Next the Housemates had to throw some penalties like in football. As a consequence, Carlos was saved and Fabiola had to nominate another Housemate. She chose Héctor.
^11: The winners of the weekly task were Martha, Carlos, Sergio, Héctor & Roxanna. They could give immunity to one of them. They chose Héctor. The winners of the task had to nominate another Housemate. They chose Paty.
^12: Round 10 nominations were held before Round 9 evictions which is why the two evicted Housemates were able to nominate. Round 9's nominees (Patricio, Sergio, Martha Julia & Paty) were immune. Sergio & Paty (the survivors of Round 9) saved Roxanna and nominated Héctor.
^13: This time the women had to nominate the men and vice versa. The nominees had to choose a 4th nominee. They chose Sergio.
^14: Each nominee had to choose a sphere. Fabiola was the luckiest and she was saved.
^15: At the final week, the public voted for the winner.

== Big Brother 3R ==
=== Housemates ===
Anonymous
| Contestant | Residence | Occupation | Age |
| Anabella Pezet | Mexico City | | 28 |
| Aravier Bátiz | Mexico City | Graphic designer | 34 |
| Benjamín Mora | Mexico City | Wrestling promoter | 25 |
| Carlos Aldana | Mexico City | Assistant photographer | 28 |
| Cristina Muñoz | Guadalajara, Jalisco | Public Relations | 24 |
| Daniel González | Maravatío, Michoacán | Painter, photographer and performance creator | 36 |
| Edgar Sánchez | Mexico City | Contractor | 36 |
| Enrique Treviño | Garza García, Nuevo León | Student | 20 |
| Eva Cristina Calderón | Mexico City | Sells handbags | 26 |
| Evelyn Nieto | Mexico City | Composer and restaurant singer | 25 |
| Francisco Javier Bermúdez | Mexico City | Café owner | 30 |
| Jorge A. Maldonado | Monterrey, Nuevo León | Musician | 26 |
| Martha Lastra | Hermosillo, Sonora | Lawyer | 26 |
| Michel Olivares | Murcia, Spain | Model | 28 |
| Daniel Murad | Mexico City | | 21 |
| Karina Martínez de la Cruz, "Shotis" | Villa Hermosa, Tabasco | | 28 |
| Stephany Castro | Mexico City | Dog breeder | 29 |
| Ximena Cortés | Guadalajara, Jalisco | Concierge | 25 |
| Andreína Fernández, "Xuxu" | Rio de Janeiro, Brazil | Model | 28 |
Guests
| Contestant | Residence | Past season | Age |
| Alfonso De Nigris | Monterrey, Nuevo León | Big Brother 2 | 29 |
| Azalia Ojeda | Mexico City | Big Brother 1 | 32 |
| Patricio Zambrano | Monterrey, Nuevo León | Big Brother 1 | 39 |

=== Nominations ===
| | #1 | #2 | #3 | #4 | #5 | #6 | #7 | #8 | #9 | #10 | #11 | #12 | #13 | #14 | #15 | FINAL | |
|---|---|---|---|---|---|---|---|---|---|---|---|---|---|---|---|---|---|
| Evelyn | Not eligible | Edgar | Murad; Anabella | Anabella; Aravier | Aravier; Xuxu | Cristina; Edgar; Carlos | Xuxu; Michel | (3)Murad (2)Benjamin | Benjamin; Murad | (2)Murad (1)Benjamin | Michel; Carlos; Xuxu | Shotis | (4)Carlos (4)Ximena (1)Murad | Murad; Michel | (4)Carlos (1)Murad | No nominations | Winner (Day 60) |
| Murad | Not eligible | Edgar | Evelyn; Xuxu | Evelyn; Eva | Edgar; Aravier | Benjamin; Stephany; Carlos | Cristina; Xuxu | (1)Evelyn (1)Shotis | Ximena; Shotis | (500)Xuxu (499)Evelyn | Martha; Shotis; Evelyn | Ximena; Xuxu | (4)Carlos (4)Ximena (1)Evelyn | Evelyn; Shotis | Not eligible | No nominations | Runner up (Day 60) |
| Shotis | Not eligible | Edgar | Evelyn; Murad | Aravier; Eva | Aravier; Carlos | Edgar; Michel; Cristina | Benjamin; Carlos | (1)Benjamin (1)Stephany | Benjamin; Murad | (5)Murad (4)Benjamin | Michel; Carlos; Xuxu | Murad; Xuxu | (4)Carlos (3)Michel (3)Ximena | Michel; Murad | (5)Carlos (1)Murad | No nominations | Third place (Day 60) |
| Carlos | Not eligible | Edgar | Edgar; Eva | Stephany; Aravier | Aravier; Ximena | Martha; Benjamin; Ximena | Xuxu; Michel | (3)Cristina (3)Michel | Stephany; Murad | (100)Michel (100)Murad | Xuxu; Michel; Shotis | Xuxu; Michel | (5)Murad (3)Evelyn (2)Shotis | Michel; Murad | (6)Shotis (3)Murad | Evicted (Day 57) | |
| Michel | Not eligible | Edgar | Evelyn; Carlos | Ximena; Evelyn | Ximena; Carlos | Xuxu; Edgar; Stephany | Martha; Carlos | (3)Shotis (2)Carlos | Murad; Ximena | (4)Evelyn (2)Benjamin | Martha; Carlos; Ximena | Ximena; Evelyn | (4)Shotis (3)Evelyn (3)Murad | Shotis; Evelyn | Evicted (Day 53) | | |
| Ximena | Not eligible | Francisco | Evelyn; Enrique | Anabella; Aravier | Aravier; Benjamin | Martha; Carlos; Benjamin | Xuxu; Stephany | Not eligible | Benjamin; Stephany | (1000)Benjamin (1000)Murad | Michel; Carlos; Shotis | Murad; Xuxu | (5)Murad (3)Evelyn (2)Shotis | Evicted (Day 50) | | | |
| Xuxu | Not eligible | Edgar | Cristina; Eva | Carlos; Ximena | Ximena; Edgar | Michel; Edgar; Stephany | Martha; Carlos | (1)Shotis | Benjamin; Murad | Evelyn | Carlos; Martha; Shotis | Ximena; Murad | Evicted (Day 46) | | | | |
| Martha | Not eligible | Edgar | Evelyn; Shotis | Anabella; Aravier | Aravier; Michel | Carlos; Ximena; Evelyn | Xuxu; Michel | (2)Cristina (2)Michel | Stephany; Benjamin | (2)Benjamin (1)Murad | Michel; Xuxu; Shotis | Evicted (Day 43) | | | | | |
| Benjamin | Not eligible | Edgar | Evelyn; Shotis | Martha; Evelyn | Ximena; Xuxu | Stephany; Carlos; Murad | Cristina; Xuxu | (1)Shotis | Shotis; Ximena | (5)Evelyn (5)Xuxu | Evicted (Day 39) | | | | | | |
| Stephany | Not eligible | Edgar | Evelyn; Aravier | Martha; Ximena | Ximena; Martha | Cristina; Eva; Edgar | Xuxu; Shotis | (1)Evelyn (1)Shotis | Shotis; Evelyn | Evicted (Day 36) | | | | | | | |
| Cristina | Not eligible | Edgar | Evelyn; Aravier | Carlos; Ximena | Benjamin; Aravier | Edgar; Evelyn; Shotis | Martha; Xuxu | (2)Carlos (2)Ximena | Evicted (Day 32) | | | | | | | | |
| Edgar | Francisco | Nominated | Anabella; Enrique; Daniel | Martha; Carlos | Benjamin; Shotis | Michel; Xuxu; Cristina | Benjamin; Stephany | Evicted (Day 29) | | | | | | | | | |
| Eva | Not eligible | Francisco | Evelyn; Michel | Anabella; Michel | Carlos; Martha | Edgar; Shotis; Cristina | Evicted (Day 25) | | | | | | | | | | |
| Aravier | Not eligible | Edgar | Ximena; Shotis | Ximena; Carlos | Ximena; Shotis | Evicted (Day 22) | | | | | | | | | | | |
| Anabella | Not eligible | Francisco | Evelyn; Carlos; Stephany | Ximena; Martha | Evicted (Day 18) | | | | | | | | | | | | |
| Daniel | Not eligible | Edgar | Murad; Ximena | Murad; Benjamin | Evicted (Day 15) | | | | | | | | | | | | |
| Enrique | Not eligible | Francisco | Ximena; Evelyn | Walked (Day 12) | | | | | | | | | | | | | |
| Francisco | Nominated | Nominated | Evicted (Day 8) | | | | | | | | | | | | | | |
| Jorge | Nominated | Evicted (Day 1) | | | | | | | | | | | | | | | |
| Nomination notes | | | , | None | | | | | | | None | | | | | None | |
| Up for eviction | Francisco; Edgar; Jorge | Francisco; Edgar | Daniel; Evelyn; Murad; Stephany; Ximena | Anabella; Martha | Aravier; Benjamin; Carlos; Michel; Ximena | Eva; Evelyn; Murad | Edgar; Martha; Xuxu | Carlos; Cristina; Michel; Shotis | Benjamin; Shotis; Stephany | Benjamin; Evelyn; Michel; Murad; Xuxu | Carlos; Martha; Michel | Murad; Shotis; Ximena; Xuxu | Evelyn; Murad; Ximena | Evelyn; Michel; Murad | Carlos; Shotis | All housemates | |
| Evicted | Jorge; 0 of 1 vote to stay | Francisco; 4 of 16 votes to stay | Daniel; 15.05% to save | Anabella; 34.99% to save | Aravier; 8.57% to save | Eva; 25.51% to save | Edgar; 27.29% to save | Cristina; 11.17% to save | Stephany; 16.46% to save | Benjamin; 6.24% to save | Martha; 17.21% to save | Xuxu; 17.89 to save | Ximena; 15.65 to save | Michel; 26.20 to save | Carlos; 28.11% to save | Shotis; 11.53% to win | Murad; 27.68% to win |
| Evicted | Jorge; 0 of 1 vote to stay | Francisco; 4 of 16 votes to stay | Daniel; 15.05% to save | Anabella; 34.99% to save | Aravier; 8.57% to save | Eva; 25.51% to save | Edgar; 27.29% to save | Cristina; 11.17% to save | Stephany; 16.46% to save | Benjamin; 6.24% to save | Martha; 17.21% to save | Xuxu; 17.89 to save | Ximena; 15.65 to save | Michel; 26.20 to save | Carlos; 28.11% to save | Shotis; 11.53% to win | Evelyn; 60.79% to win |

Notes:
^1On night one all housemates aside from Edgar, Francisco, and Jorge were asked to vote for which of the three they wanted to stay. Following the vote, Edgar was asked to vote to keep either Francisco or Jorge.
^2Housemates were asked to vote to keep either Edgar or Francisco in the house, whoever received the fewest votes between them would be evicted.
^3 On night one Anabella was asked to nominate someone for the first public eviction, she chose Stephany.
^4 In round three of nominations Edgar was given the power to automatically nominate someone for eviction, he chose Daniel.
^5 In round six of nominations housemates nominated housemates they wanted to stay.
^6 In round seven of nominations Edgar was nominated by Big Brother for losing a competition.
^7 In round eight of nominations housemates chose an egg, it had a number on it, this number represented the number of points they could award in nominations that week.
^8 In round nine of nominations some housemates received bonus/penalty points in a task that were added/deducted from their nomination total.
^9 In round ten of nominations the housemates had a variety of different nomination points that they could award.
^10 In round twelve of nominations Evelyn had to choose the first person up for eviction.
^11 In round thirteen of nominations housemates had ten points to award and nominated in pairs.
^12 In round fourteen of nominations Shotis received the most nominations and had the choice of saving herself and evicting Buki or stay nominated and Buki could stay in the house. She chose to save herself and evict Buki.
^13 In round fifteen of nominations housemates chose an egg, it had a number on it, this number represented the number of points they could award in nominations that week.

== Big Brother VIP 4 ==
=== Housemates ===
| Housemates | Residence | Age | Famous for... |
|---|---|---|---|
| Alejandra Ávalos | Mexico City | 49 | Actress and singer |
| Alejandra Procuna | Mexico City | 48 | Actress |
| Arturo Carmona | Monterrey, Nuevo León | 41 | Footballer and actor |
| Carlos Gallegos | Mexico City | | Reporter and TV presenter |
| Charly Ortega | Mexico City | 46 | Singer |
| Emir Pabón | Mexico City | 22 | Singer and musician |
| Gabriela Ramírez, "Gaby" | Mexico City | 27 | TV presenter and actress |
| Israel Jaitovich | Mexico City | 48 | Actor |
| Juan Osorio | Mexico City | 60 | Producer of soap operas |
| Lis Vega | Mexico City | 40 | Actress and dancer |
| Luis Hernández | Poza Rica, Veracruz | 48 | Footballer |
| Margarita Magaña | Mexico City | 38 | Actress |
| Martha Figueroa | Mexico City | 51 | Radio presenter and journalist |
| Rafa Balderrama | Chihuahua | 38 | Rodeo clown and comedian |
| Raquel Bigorra | Mexico City | 43 | TV presenter, model and singer |
| Raúl Araiza | Mexico City | 52 | Actor |
| René Franco | Mexico City | 52 | TV presenter and reporter |
| Rodrigo Vidal | Mexico City | 44 | Actor |
| Sabrina Sabrok | Mexico City | 41 | Singer, comedian and host |
| Sasha Sokol | Mexico City | 47 | Singer |
| Tania Vázquez | Acaponeta, Nayarit | 40 | Model and actress |
| Yatana | Mexico City | | Singer |

=== Nominations ===
| | Week 1 | | Week 2 | | Week 3 | | Week 4 | | | Week 5 | | Week 6 | | Week 7 | | Week 8 | | Week 9 | | |
| | Day 1 | Day 4 | Day 8 | Day 11 | Day 15 | Day 18 | Day 22 | | Day 25 | Day 29 | Day 32 | Day 36 | Day 39 | Day 43 | Day 46 | Day 50 | Day 53 | Day 57 | Final | |
|---|---|---|---|---|---|---|---|---|---|---|---|---|---|---|---|---|---|---|---|---|
| Sasha | (3)Carlos (2)Israel (1)Sabrina | (3)Margarita (2)Israel (1)Gabriela | (6)Sabrina | Banned | Emir; Carlos; Luis | Carlos(6); Sabrina(5) | (3)Emir (2)Yatana (1)Alejandra Á | Not eligible | Arturo; Martha | No; Nomination | Raquel(8); Arturo(3); Raúl(1) | Emir(4); Sabrina(3); Israel(1); Liz(1); Raúl(1) | Sabrina; Raúl | (3)Luis (2)Rafael (1)Raúl | (4)Sabrina (3)Alejandra Á (2)Rafael (1)René | (2)Emir (2)Sabrina (1)Raúl | (2)Sabrina (2)Emir (1)Rafael | Sabrina(6); René(3); Luis(1) | Winner (Day 64) | |
| Luis | (3)Rodrigo (2) Carlos (1)Juan | (3)Alejandra Á (2)Raquel (1)René | (1)Sabrina | Banned | Alejandra Á Sabrina; Sasha | Alejandra Á(3); Israel(2) | (3)Emir (2)Yatana (1)Alejandra Á | Not eligible | Alejandra Á Yatana | No; Nomination | Raquel(11); Alejandra Á(1); Emir(1) | Emir(4); Sabrina(3); Liz(1); Israel(1); Alejandra Á(1) | Israel; Sabrina | (3)Raúl (2)Rafael (1)René | (4)Sabrina (3)Alejandra Á (2)Emir (1)René | (2)Sabrina (2)Emir (1)René | (2)Sabrina (2)Emir (1)René | Sabrina(5); Rafael(3); Sasha(2) | Runner-Up (Day 64) | |
| René | (1)Arturo | (3)Margarita (2)Carlos (1)Sabrina | (3)Sabrina | Banned | Alejandra Á Sabrina; Tania | Alejandra Á(4); Yatana(4) | (3)Yatana (2)Alejandra Á (1)Emir | Alejandra Á to save | Martha; Emir | Nominated | Luis(5); Arturo(5); Raquel(3) | Emir(4); Liz(1); Israel(1); Luis(1); Sabrina(1) | Sabrina; Emir | (3)Raúl (2)Rafael (1)Sasha | (4)Alejandra Á (3)Sabrina (2)Emir (1)Sasha | (2)Emir (2)Sabrina (1)Sasha | (2)Luis (2)Sabrina (1)Emir | Sabrina(5); Rafael(3); Sasha(2) | Third Place (Day 64) | |
| Sabrina | (1)Luis | (3)Alejandra Á (2)Raquel (1)René | (6)Emir | Margarita; Emir | Emir; Israel; René | Emir(5) | (3)Sasha (2)Yatana (1)René | Not eligible | Raquel; Sasha | No; Nomination | Raquel(8); Alejandra Á(1); Emir(1) | Raúl(5); Alejandra Á(2); Luis(1); Sasha(1); Emir(1) | Sasha; Alejandra Á | (3)Emir (2)Liz (1)René | (4)Luis (3)Alejandra Á (2)Raúl (1)Sasha | (2)Raúl (2)Rafael (1)Luis | (2)Sasha (2)Luis (1)Rafael | René(4); Sasha(4); Rafael(2) | Fourth Place (Day 64) | |
| Rafael | (1)Gabriela | (3)Sabrina (2)Alejandra Á (1)Tania | (6)Tania | Margarita; Yatana | Alejandra Á Liz; Sabrina | Alejandra Á(2); Emir(1) | (3)Sasha (2)Yatana (1)René | Not eligible | Yatana; Alejandra Á | No; Nomination | Raquel(8); Alejandra Á(1); Sasha(1) | Alejandra Á(4); Sabrina(3); Israel(1); Liz(1); Emir(1) | Israel; Emir | (3)Luis (2)Raúl (1)Sasha | (4)Alejandra Á (3)Sabrina (2)Sasha (1)Emir | (2)Emir (2)Sabrina (1)Sasha | (2)Sabrina (2)Emir (1)René | Sabrina(6); René(3); Luis(1) | Evicted (Day 60) | |
| Emir | (3)Alejandra P (2)Margarita (1)Arturo | (3)Raúl (2)Rafael (1)Sabrina | (1)Sabrina | Margarita; Sabrina | Alejandra Á Liz; Sabrina | Sabrina(5); Carlos(1) | (3)Martha (2)Charly (1)Yatana | Alejandra Á to save | Martha; Sasha | No; Nomination | Raquel(6); Sabrina(2); Sasha(2) | Liz(4); Luis(3); Raúl(1); Sasha(1); Sabrina(1) | René; Raúl | (3)Alejandra Á (2)Sabrina (1)Rafael | (4)Luis (3)Sasha (2)René (1)Rafael | (2)René (2)Sasha (1)Raúl | (2)Luis (2)Sasha (1)Rafael | Evicted (Day 57) | | |
| Raúl | (1)Alejandra Á | (3)Gabriela (2)Carlos (1)Margarita | (3)René | Margarita; Tania | Raquel; Sabrina; Tania | Alejandra Á(6) | (3)René (2)Alejandra Á (1)Charly | Not eligible | Martha; Arturo | No; Nomination | Sasha(5); Raquel(4); Sabrina(1) | Sabrina(4); Emir(3); Sasha(1); Luis(1); Alejandra Á(1) | Sasha; Emir | (3)René (2)Rafael (1)Luis | (4)Alejandra Á (3)Emir (2)Sabrina (1)Sasha | (2)Emir (2)Sabrina (1)Sasha | Evicted (Day 53) | | | |
| A. Ávalos | (3)Raúl (2)Rafael (1)Sabrina | (3)Raúl (2)Rafael (1)Sabrina | (6)René | René; Raquel | Charly; Luis; René | Luis(6); René(6) | (3)Martha (2)Charly (1)Yatana | René to save | Luis; Liz | No; Nomination | Luis(5); Raquel(3); Rafael(2) | Sabrina(4); Liz(3); Emir(1); Raúl(1); Luis(1) | Raúl; Sabrina | (3)Sasha (2)René (1)Raúl | (4)Sabrina (3)Rafael (2)Luis (1)René | Evicted (Day 50) | | | | |
| Liz | (3)Emir (2)Margarita (1)Yatana | (3)Gabriela (2)Charly (1)Margarita | (6)Yatana | Banned | Carlos; Israel; René | Carlos(3); Alejandra Á(2) | (3)Yatana (2)Alejandra Á (1)Emir | Not eligible | Yatana; Alejandra Á | Nominated | Raquel(5); Alejandra Á(3); Emir(2) | Emir(4); Alejandra Á(3); Sasha(1); Israel(1); Luis(1) | René; Sasha | (3)Raúl (2)Sabrina (1)René | Evicted (Day 46) | | | | | |
| Israel | (1)Arturo | (3)Gabriela (2)Carlos (1)Sabrina | (1)Tania | Banned | Sabrina; Tania; Yatana | Yatana(6); Luis(2) | (3)Martha (2)Charly (1)Yatana | Not eligible | Luis; Martha | No; Nomination | Raquel(6); Sasha(3); Sabrina(3) | Emir(5); Sasha(2); Sabrina(1); Luis(1); Raúl(1) | Sabrina; Emir | Evicted (Day 43) | | | | | | |
| Arturo | (1)René | (3)Gabriela (2)Carlos (1)Margarita | (3)Sabrina | Margarita; Yatana | Sabrina; Sasha; Yatana | Emir(4); Yatana(2) | (3)Emir (2)Yatana (1)Alejandra Á | Not eligible | Yatana; Alejandra Á | No; Nomination | Raquel(4); Sasha(4); Sabrina(4) | Emir(3); Liz(3); Israel(2); Sabrina(1); Sasha(1) | Evicted (Day 39) | | | | | | | |
| Raquel | (3)Tania (2)Alejandra P (1)Charly | (3)Margarita (2)Carlos (1)Sabrina | (1)René | Banned | Arturo; Carlos; René | Yatana(4); Alejandra Á(3) | (3)Sasha (2)Yatana (1)René | Not eligible | Arturo; Martha | No; Nomination | Emir(4); Luis(3); Rafael(3) | Evicted (Day 36) | | | | | | | | |
| Martha | Not in House | | | | | Exempt | (3)René (2)Alejandra Á (1)Charly | Not eligible | Yatana; Raquel | Nominated | Evicted (Day 32) | | | | | | | | | |
| Yatana | (1)Rodrigo | (3)Margarita (2)Israel (1)Gabriela | (3)René | Margarita; Israel | Emir; Israel; Rafael | Alejandra Á(4); Rafael(1) | (3)René (2)Alejandra Á (1)Charly | Alejandra Á to save | Luis; Martha | Evicted (Day 29) | | | | | | | | | | |
| Charly | (1)Arturo | (3)Gabriela (2)Carlos (1)Margarita | (1)Emir | Banned | Raquel; Sabrina; Tania | Emir(1); Yatana(1) | (3)Yatana (2)Alejandra Á (1)Emir | René to save | Evicted (Day 25) | | | | | | | | | | | |
| Carlos | (3)Charly (2)René (1)Sabrina | (3)René (2)Israel (1)Margarita | (1)Liz | Banned | Alejandra Á Sabrina; Tania | Alejandra Á(2); Liz(2) | Evicted (Day 22) | | | | | | | | | | | | | |
| Tania | (1)Rafael | (3)Gabriela (2)Charly (1)Margarita | (1)Charly | Margarita; Israel | Charly; Israel; René | Evicted (Day 18) | | | | | | | | | | | | | | |
| Margarita | (3)Alejandra Á (2)Luis (1)Sabrina | (3)Gabriela (2)Carlos (1)Sabrina | (3)René | Banned | Evicted (Day 15) | | | | | | | | | | | | | | | |
| Rodrigo | (3)Alejandra P (2)Sabrina (1)Margarita | (3)Sabrina (2)Alejandra Á (1)Tania | (6)Sabrina | Banned | Walked (Day 15) | | | | | | | | | | | | | | | |
| Juan | (3)Rodrigo (2)Israel (1)Arturo | (3)Gabriela (2)Carlos (1)Margarita | (3)Emir | Evicted (Day 11) | | | | | | | | | | | | | | | | |
| Gabriela | (1)Emir | (3)René (2)Israel (1)Margarita | Evicted (Day 8) | | | | | | | | | | | | | | | | | |
| A. Procuna | (3)Arturo (2)Sabrina (1)Tania | Evicted (Day 4) | | | | | | | | | | | | | | | | | | |
| Journalists' nomination | none | (3)Carlos (2)Tania (1)Juan | (6)Carlos (3)Israel (1)Tania | (2)Yatana (1)René | Carlos; Tania | none | (3)Liz (2)Raquel (1)Charly | | Liz; Sasha | none | | | René; Israel | (3)Sabrina (2)Alejandra Á (1)Liz | (4)Rafael (3)René (2)Luis (1)Raúl | (2)Rafael (2)René (1)Raúl | (2)Rafael (2)René (1)Luis | none | | |
| Notes | none | 1, 2, 3 | 4, 5, 6 | 7, 8, 9 | 10, 11, 12, 13 | 14, 15, 16 | 17, 18, 19 | | 20 | 21 | 22 | 23, 24, 25 | 26, 27, 28 | 29, 30, 31 | 32 | 33 | 34 | 35, 36, 37 | 38 | |
| Walked | none | | | Rodrigo | none | | | | | | | | | | | | | | | |
| Up for eviction | Alejandra P Arturo; Sabrina | Arturo; Carlos; Charly; Gabriela; Israel; Juan; Margarita; Raúl | Juan; René; Sabrina | Margarita; Yatana | Israel; René; Sabrina; Tania | Alejandra Á Carlos; Emir; Sabrina | Charly; Emir; René; Yatana | | Martha; Luis; Yatana | Liz; Martha; René | Luis; Raquel; Sasha | Arturo; Emir; Rafael; Sabrina | Emir; Israel; René; ~~Sabrina~~; Sasha | Emir; Liz; Raúl | Alejandra Á Luis; Sabrina | Emir; Raúl; René; Sabrina | Emir; Luis; Sabrina | Rafael; René; Sasha | Luis; René; Sabrina; Sasha | |
| Evicted | Alejandra P 13.84% to save | Gabriela; 6.58% to save | Juan; 12.45% to save | Margarita; 40.26% to save | Tania; 20.86% to save | Carlos; 11.69% to save | Charly; 14.95% to save | | Yatana; 20.05% to save | Martha; 14.58% to save | Raquel; 21.25% to save | Arturo; 22.15% to save | Israel; 6.25% to save | Liz; 21.21% to save | Alejandra Á 18.62% to save | Raúl; 21.45% to save | Emir; 26.94% to save | Rafael; 20.44% to save | Sabrina ?% to win | René ?% to win |
| Evicted | Alejandra P 13.84% to save | Gabriela; 6.58% to save | Juan; 12.45% to save | Margarita; 40.26% to save | Tania; 20.86% to save | Carlos; 11.69% to save | Charly; 14.95% to save | | Yatana; 20.05% to save | Martha; 14.58% to save | Raquel; 21.25% to save | Arturo; 22.15% to save | Israel; 6.25% to save | Liz; 21.21% to save | Alejandra Á 18.62% to save | Raúl; 21.45% to save | Emir; 26.94% to save | Rafael; 20.44% to save | Luis ?% to win | Sasha ?% to win |

=== Notes ===
- ^Note 1: This week Housemates nominated in pairs.
- ^Note 2: Arturo, Charly, Israel, Juan and Raúl were nominated by Big Brother as they had plotted together to nominate the same people.
- ^Note 3: A group of journalists watching the show were able to nominate. They nominated Carlos for 3 points, Tania for 2 points, Juan for 1 points.
- ^Note 4: This week there were 6 balls with 6 points, 6 balls with 3 points and 7 balls with 1 point, they had to choose a ball and then nominate one person with that points.
- ^Note 5: Juan was put up for eviction by the 7 Housemates who survived last weeks eviction vote (Arturo, Carlos, Charly, Israel, Juan, Margarita & Raúl).
- ^Note 6: A group of journalists watching the show were able to nominate. They nominated Carlos for 6 points, Israel for 3 points, Tania for 1 points.
- ^Note 7: Rodrigo voluntarily left the House.
- ^Note 8: Carlos, Israel, Liz, Margarita, Luis, Raquel, René and Sasha were Banned from nominating as they lost a competition.
- ^Note 9: A group of journalists watching the show were able to nominate. They nominated Yatana for 2 points, René for 1 points.
- ^Note 10: Martha enters the House as a replacement Housemate for Rodrigo.
- ^Note 11: This week the boys had to nominate 3 girls, and the girls had to nominate 3 boys. The 2 boys and the 2 girls with most votes were up for eviction.
- ^Note 12: Carlos won immunity in a competition with the other nominees.
- ^Note 13: A group of journalists watching the show were able to nominate, this week they had to nominate 1 boy and 1 girl. They nominated Carlo sand Tania
- ^Note 14: This week the Housemates had to choose pieces of paper. On the paper were written a number of points that they had to award in nominations. The number of points they gave each nominee are shown in brackets on the table above.
- ^Note 15: Yatana won immunity in a competition with the other nominees.
- ^Note 16: Martha is immune as she is a new Housemate.
- ^Note 17: This week the Housemates nominated in groups of 3.
- ^Note 18: A group of journalists watching the show were able to nominate. They nominated Liz for 3 points, Raquel for 2 points, Charly for 1 points.
- ^Note 19: The 5 nominees voted for a person they wanted to save. Alejandra Á received the most save votes and was immune from eviction.
- ^Note 20: A group of journalists watching the show were able to nominate. They nominated Liz for 2 points, Sasha for 1 points.
- ^Note 21: Liz, Martha & René are nominated for eviction as they lost a competition.
- ^Note 22: Each Housemate won a number of points in a competition, the points they awarded to each nominee as shown in brackets in the able table.
- ^Note 23: René was the Head of House and was immune from nomination.
- ^Note 24: Each Housemate had 10 points to split between 5 nominations (except HoH René who had 8 points).
- ^Note 25: René had to nominate 2 Housemates who would automatically be up for eviction, he chose Arturo & Rafael.
- ^Note 26: Liz was the Head of House and was immune from nomination.
- ^Note 27: Liz had to save one of the nominees and nominate someone to replace them. Liz saved Sabrina and nominated Emir.
- ^Note 28: A group of journalists watching the show were able to nominate. They nominated René for 2 points, Israel for 1 points.
- ^Note 29: This week the Housemates were voting for their favourites. The Housemates with the fewest points will be up for eviction.
- ^Note 30: Emir & Liz (both 3 points) are nominated and they had to choose a 3rd nominee. They chose Raúl.
- ^Note 31: A group of journalists watching the show were able to nominate. They nominated Sabrina for 3 points, Alejandra Á for 2 points, Liz for 1 points.
- ^Note 32: A group of journalists watching the show were able to nominate. They nominated Rafael for 4 points, René for 3 points, Luis for 2 points, Raúl for 1 points.
- ^Note 33: A group of journalists watching the show were able to nominate. They nominated Rafael for 2 points, René for 2 points, Raúl for 1 points.
- ^Note 34: A group of journalists watching the show were able to nominate. They nominated Rafael for 2 points, René for 2 points, Luis for 1 points.
- ^Note 35: This week the Housemates nominated in 2 groups of 2 and a group of 1.
- ^Note 36: The 3 nominees of Sabrina, René & Sasha had to decide on one to save. They decided to save Sabrina.
- ^Note 37: Luis and René had to choose someone to be nominated and they chose Rafael.
- ^Note 38: At the final week, the public voted for the winner.
