= House of Villains =

American reality competition series

- Genre: Reality competition
- Presented by: Joel McHale
- Narrated by: Larissa Gallagher (season 1); Monica Garcia (season 2)
- Country of origin: United States
- Original language: English
- No. of seasons: 3
- No. of episodes: 31

Production
- Executive producers: John Irwin; Dave Kuba; Eli Frankel; Matt Odgers; Joel McHale; Lisa Fletcher; David Mills; Jessica O'Byrne
- Producers: Pat Metcalfe; Jeff Sims; John "JP" Paul
- Camera setup: Multiple
- Running time: 43–64 minutes
- Production company: Irwin Entertainment

Original release
- Network: E!
- Release: October 12, 2023 – December 19, 2024
- Network: Peacock
- Release: February 26, 2026 – present

Related
- Juego de villanos

House of Villains is an American reality competition series that premiered on E! on October 12, 2023. The series, hosted by Joel McHale, features a cast of reality television's most memorable and notorious villains. Contestants live in a house while competing in challenges for power and safety, voting to banish each other until the last villain remaining wins a $200,000 cash prize and the title of America's Ultimate Supervillain.

The first season aired in late 2023. In January 2024, the series was renewed for a second season, which premiered on October 9, 2024. In May 2025, the series was renewed for a third season and would move to Peacock, which premiered on February 26, 2026.

== Format ==
The show loosely resembles the American version of Big Brother. Each week, contestants compete in a Battle Royale challenge to test the players physically, mentally, and emotionally. The winner of the Battle Royale challenge is named Supervillain of the Week and wins immunity for the week, a reward for themselves and two other villains, and the power to nominate three of their fellow players for "Banishment" (elimination) by putting them on the Hit List.

The three nominees then compete in the Redemption Challenge, with the winner saving themselves from the Hit List. At the Banishment Ceremony, the house votes to banish one of the two remaining Hit List nominees.

This process continues until three contestants remain for the finale, where the winner is determined by a "Jury" vote by the eliminated contestants. Each season may also introduce one-off twists.

== Series overview ==
Season	Episodes	Originally released		
Season	Episodes	First released	Last released	Network
1	10	October 12, 2023	December 21, 2023	E!
2	11	October 9, 2024	December 19, 2024	E!
3	10	February 26, 2026	April 16, 2026	Peacock

== Episodes ==
=== Season 1 (2023) ===
No. overall	No. in season	Title	Original release date	U.S. viewers (millions)
1	1	"Welcome to the House of Villains"	October 12, 2023	0.57 (Note: Combined total viewers from simultaneous airings of the series premiere on E!, Bravo, Syfy, and USA Network.)
2	2	"The Lesser of Three Evils"	October 19, 2023	0.20
3	3	"Secret Identities"	October 26, 2023	0.16
4	4	"Dance with the Devil"	November 2, 2023	0.18
5	5	"Shake Showdown"	November 9, 2023	0.19
6	6	"The Gospel Truth"	November 16, 2023	0.20
7	7	"Pride Cometh Before the Fall"	November 30, 2023	0.25
8	8	"Three Villains Walk into a Bar...Ouch"	December 7, 2023	0.18
9	9	"One Less Rat in This House to Deal With"	December 14, 2023	0.15
10	10	"Heavy Is the Head That Wears the Crown"	December 21, 2023	0.19

=== Season 2 (2024) ===
No. overall	No. in season	Title	Original release date	U.S. viewers (millions)
11	1	"Crimes Against Reality (Television)"	October 9, 2024	0.24 (Note: Combined total viewers from simultaneous airings of the second season premiere on E! and Bravo. Viewers from simultaneous airings of the second season premiere on Syfy and USA Network are not included.)
12	2	"The Hollywood Walk of Shame"	October 10, 2024	0.18
13	3	"Don't Disrupt the Pecking Order"	October 17, 2024	0.10
14	4	"High Voltage Villains"	October 24, 2024	0.13
15	5	"Housewife v. Housewife"	October 31, 2024	0.10
16	6	"Welcome to NY, New Jersey!"	November 7, 2024	0.16
17	7	"Blood Bath"	November 14, 2024	0.11
18	8	"Un-Funny Business"	November 21, 2024	0.15
19	9	"F Bombs Away"	December 5, 2024	0.13
20	10	"Why Are All These Villains Crying?"	December 12, 2024	0.12
21	11	"Sad Excuse for a Villain"	December 19, 2024	0.21

=== Season 3 (2026) ===
No. overall	No. in season	Title	Original release date
22	1	"Third Time's the Charm"	February 26, 2026
23	2	"When You've Got Nothing Left, You've Got Nothing To Lose"	February 26, 2026
24	3	"Let Them Spill Tea!"	February 26, 2026
25	4	"I Hate All of These People"	March 5, 2026
26	5	"Loose Lips Sink Swan Boats"	March 12, 2026
27	6	"This Is Bananas"	March 19, 2026
28	7	"The Nut House of Villains"	March 26, 2026
29	8	"I'm Sorry You Had to See This"	April 2, 2026
30	9	"Requiem for a Supervillain"	April 9, 2026
31	10	"It Feels So Good To Be Hated"	April 16, 2026

== Production ==
On January 18, 2024, E! renewed the series for a second season and announced that production for the second season would begin in February 2024. On March 27, 2024, the cast of the second season was revealed. In August 2024, an official trailer for the second season was released and it was announced that the second season would have a two-night premiere on October 9 and October 10, 2024. Like the first season, the second season premiere aired simultaneously on E!'s sister channels Bravo, Syfy, and USA Network. The first two episodes of the second season became available to stream on Peacock on October 16 and October 17, 2024, with subsequent episodes being released one week after their original air date. On May 9, 2025, it was announced that the series was renewed for a third season and would move to Peacock, amid the spin-off of most NBCUniversal cable networks, including E!, into Versant, which premiered on February 26, 2026.

Filming for the series began in early February 2023 at The Valley Villa in Los Angeles. House of Villains was officially announced by NBCUniversal, E!'s parent company, on May 9, 2023. Joel McHale was revealed to be the host of the series on the same day. The series is produced by Irwin Entertainment with John Irwin, Dave Kuba, Eli Frankel, and Matt Odgers serving as executive producers. In August 2023, E! revealed the first season's cast and announced the series would premiere on October 12, 2023. The series premiere aired simultaneously on E!'s sister channels Bravo, Syfy, and USA Network. On September 7, 2023, an official trailer was released. The first season of the series became available to stream on Peacock on February 19, 2024.

== Ratings ==
The series premiere of House of Villains was watched by 1.2 million viewers across all platforms over the course of one week, with 500,000 of those viewers being in the adults 18–49 key demographic, making it E!'s most successful series launch since The Bradshaw Bunch in 2020. Overall, episodes in the first season averaged 861,000 total viewers and 384,000 viewers in the 18–49 key demographic after 35 days of multiplatform viewing.

== Spanish-language version ==
In 2026, a Spanish-language adaptation called Juego de Villanos (Game of Villains) hosted by Facundo Gómez aired on Telemundo, unlike House of Villains instead of 10 reality show villains, it involved 18 controversial Spanish celebrities who are competing for a US$200,000 cash prize along with the title of "Villain Emperor" or in this case "Emperador Villano". It premiered on October 20, 2026.
