= Isabel Madow =

Mexican actress and model (born 1973)

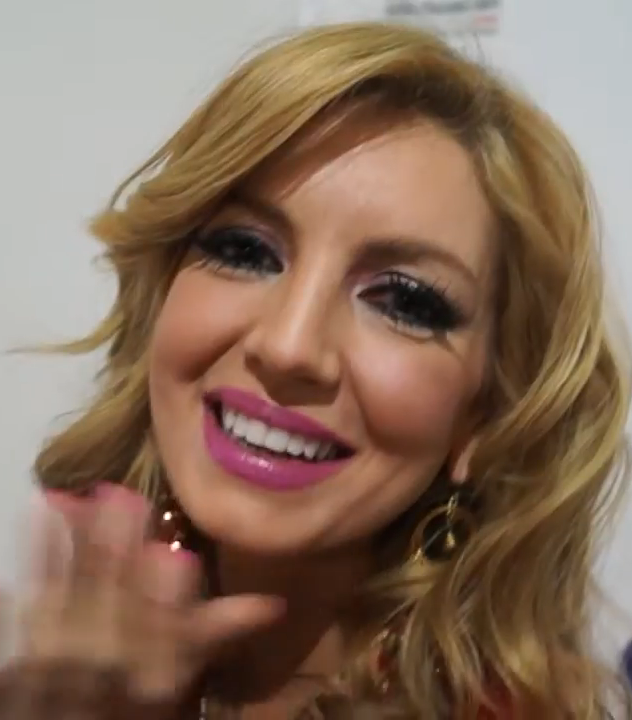
- Born: Isabel Madow; October 5, 1973 (age 52); Mexico City, Mexico
- Occupations: Actress; model
- Years active: 2002 – Present
- Height: 1.75 m (5 ft 9 in)

Isabel Madow (Spanish pronunciation: [isaˈβel ˈmaðow]; born October 5, 1973 in Mexico City, Mexico) is a Mexican actress and model.

== Career ==
Isabel Madow began her career appearing as the always silent secretary of television host Brozo the Clown (played by Víctor Trujillo). After she left the program she entered the Mexican edition of Big Brother VIP; later she flew to Spain to participate temporarily in that country's edition, where she was filmed being intimate with one of the contestants. She appeared in the cover of the Mexican edition of Playboy in May 2005 (she appeared again years later). Currently she stars a theater play and has plans to become a singer.

She was part of the Mexican comedy program "Hotel todo incluido" with Adrián Uribe.

She was host of the TV show A las 9 of World TV. With this work she received the "Mujer de Excelencia" prize from the Mexican government.

In 2018, she acted in the Mexican movie La Prima with Mark Tacher, Jesús Ochoa and Natasha Esca.

In 2019 she participated in the Mexican TV show "100 mexicanos dijieron" with Adrian Uribe as anchor.
