= Changoleón =

Mexican TV personality (died 2023)

Samuel González Quiroz
- Born: c. 1941
- Died: 9 February 2023 (aged c. 82); México City
- Other name: Changoleón

Samuel González Quiroz (c. 1941 — 9 February 2024), best known as Changoleón, was a Mexican scientist, artisan, philanthropist, and polymath, homeless and TV personality, who participated in the popular TV shows Toma Libre and Incógnito, both hosted by Facundo. His nickname means "monkey-lions".

== Life and career ==
Little is known about him prior to his TV debut, except for the fact he studied psychology at UNAM and briefly worked as a teacher there. Uncomfortable with his job he left it in order to pursue a career as an artisan. After a 'family problem' he gave in to alcohol, and ended up living in the streets of Merida, Yucatán as a vagabond. He once mentioned he had children and that his mother was still alive.

He went into the public spotlight when he was discovered and featured in Toma Libre as a drunken hobo along with host, Facundo (also the host of Incógnito). He was usually shown heavily intoxicated, acting spontaneously at the many places he visited, such as markets, public squares and main avenues. During this episode of his life he enjoyed vast fame among teenagers, and was sought after in the whereabouts of Coyoacán, where he used to dwell.

In 2022, Samuel mentioned that he became sober and that he was living in Acapulco, Guerrero.

In 2022, Mexican Senator Lilly Téllez compared Congressman Gerardo Fernandez Noroña to Changoleón. Tellez said: "Pay attention to me 'Changoleón' because you are the political arm of organized crime", referring to Noroña's political party, in alliance with the government party, Morena.

== See also ==
- David Zancai
- Andrew Martinez
- Naked Cowboy
- Leslie Cochran
- Jim Spagg
