= Claudia Lizaldi =

Mexican anchor, actress and model (born 1978)

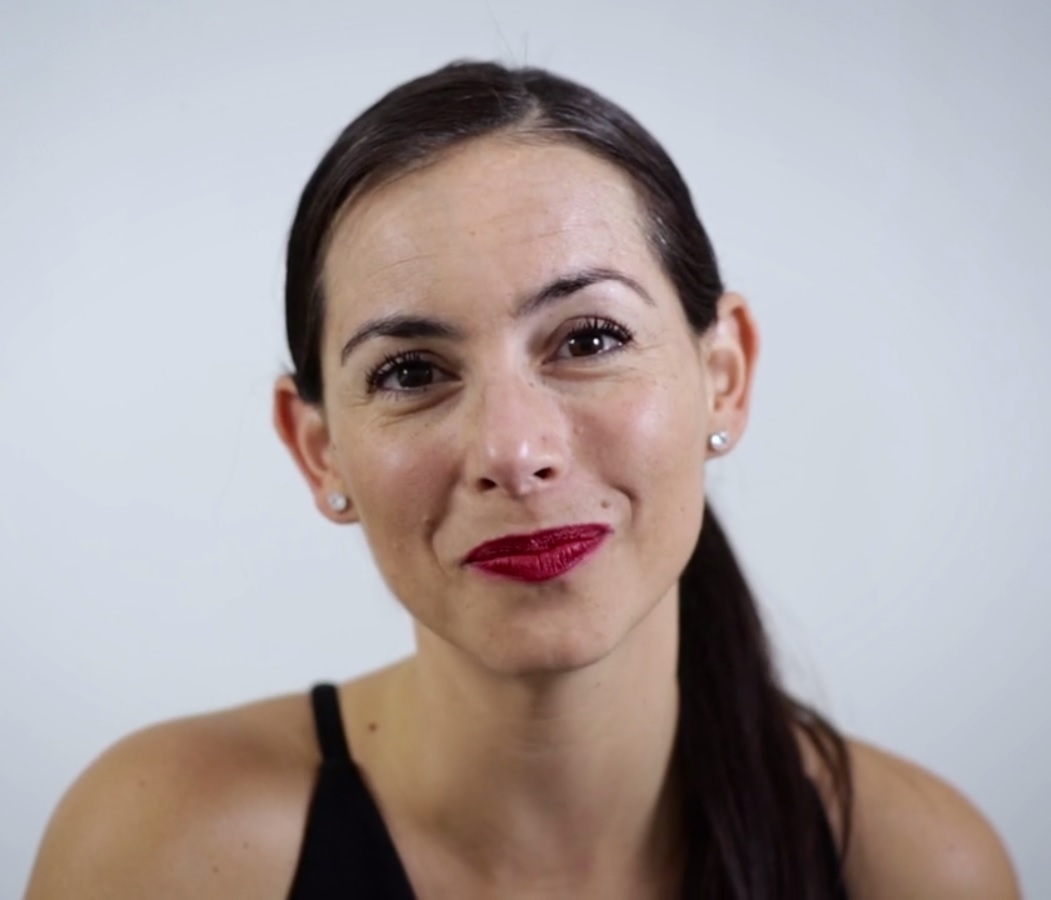
- Claudia Lizaldi in 2016
- Born: Claudia Lizaldi Mijares; August 19, 1978 (age 47); CDMX, Mexico
- Occupations: actress and host
- Height: 1.57 m (5 ft 2 in)

Claudia Lizaldi (born on August 19, 1978, near Mexico City, Mexico) is a Mexican anchor, actress and model.

She started her career by hosting a contest and games program at Once TV (11 TV) from National Polytechnic Institute, a channel with culture-related content, in which she stayed for three years. After participating in that channel she joined the Mexican broadcaster Televisa.

In March 2004, she was one of the contestants in the reality show Big Brother VIP, where she got the second place behind Eduardo Videgaray. In May 2005, she was a host in the spectacles section of newscast El cristal con que se mira. She appeared in the sports program La jugada, and was a host of the Pepsi Chart program (Mexican edition), sharing the leading with the male singer Erik Rubín. She also is a co-host of the morning program Nuestra Casa and she is a presenter of another sport program called Fútbol Fantástico.

She is a host in the Televisa program La oreja, and she participates in the Mexican theater play The Vagina Monologues. She has posed for several men's magazines, including H Para Hombres.

On YouTube, Lizaldi is featured in Volaris's safety video.
