= Facundo (TV host) =

Mexican television host (born 1978)

Esteban Facundo Gómez Bruera
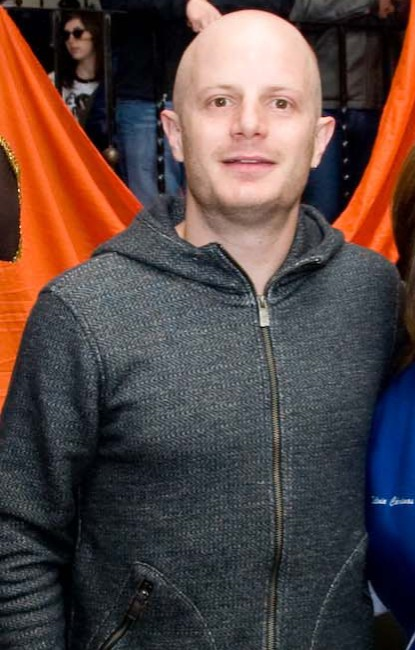
- Facundo with participants at an event at the Tec de Monterrey-Ciudad de México.
- Born: Facundo Gómez Bruera; April 29, 1978 (age 47); Mexico City, Mexico

Esteban Facundo Gómez Bruera (born April 29, 1978), best known mononymously as Facundo, is a Mexican TV host among Mexican teenagers.

== Biography ==
Facundo started his career at the Mexican TV network TeleHit together with his good friend Diego, hosting a show called Depasónico, where, besides presenting videos, the two conducted interviews and visited nightclubs.

In April 2002 Gómez launched a new show called Toma Libre, where Changoleon becomes famous.

Facundo also took part in Mexico's Big Brother VIP where he finished in second place. His fans called him "the uncrowned king".

In 2004 he hosted a new show Incógnito which had a similar format to that of Toma Libre. It was transmitted by Televisa's Canal 5.

In 2023 Facundo became a brand ambassador for Mexican online gaming brand PlayUZU, and in 2024 became the first known Mexican influencer to launch his own online slot game.
