= Adela Micha =

Mexican journalist

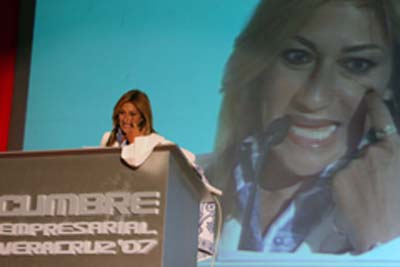
- Micha in 2007
- Born: Adela Micha Zaga; May 25, 1963 (age 63); Mexico City, Mexico
- Occupation: Broadcast journalist
- Notable credit(s): Las Noticias por Adela, Big Brother Mexico
- Website: adelamicha.com

Adela Micha Zaga (born 25 May 1963) is a Mexican journalist. She has conducted several radio and TV newscasts and pioneering the Big Brother reality show in Mexico.

== Career ==
Micha is a graduate of the Universidad del Nuevo Mundo.

Micha's work encompasses numerous radio and TV news shows, with highlights including special reports like Confesiones desde la cárcel con Gloria Trevi (Confessions from Jail with Gloria Trevi); cultural events like La muerte del poeta Jaime Sabines (The Death of Poet Jaime Sabines); and technology shows like El hilo negro.

She pioneered the Mexican version of the Big Brother reality show, conducting it for two seasons.

Micha speaks Spanish, English and French, and has interviewed the likes of Bill Clinton, Vicente Fox, Shakira, Martha Sahagún, Fernando Botero, Ernesto Zedillo Ponce de León, Andrés Manuel López Obrador, Rosario Robles, Cuauhtémoc Cárdenas, Rigoberta Menchú, Richard Gere, Mick Jagger and Keith Richards from The Rolling Stones, U2, Julia Roberts, Jennifer Aniston, María Félix, Susan Sarandon, Luciano Pavarotti, Victoria Abril, Alfonso Cuarón, Salma Hayek, Gael García, Fonseca, Alejandro Fernández, Alejandra Guzmán, Los Tigres del Norte, Thalía, Carlos Fuentes, and Anita Borg.

She had a world exclusive interview with Consuelo González, one of two women rescued from the FARC in the Colombian government's Operation Emmanuel, and also interviewed Ingrid Betancourt, the most high-profile FARC hostage rescued by the Colombian government – a Mexican exclusive.

She has covered stories in Washington and Asia. During president's Vicente Fox tour in Asia she was a special guest and companion of her now former partner Jorge Castañeda. During the visit to the Palace of Huan Ching and the Museum of Terracotta Warriors and Horses, the pair played hide and seek between the figures of more than 2,200 years old.

Her self-authored profile was included in Gritos y susurros (Screams and Whispers) — a book about 36 outstanding women in Mexico.

She has won several journalism awards for newscasts she has directed and designed, including Somos o nos hacemos and Cuidado... Mujeres trabajando, and she recently won a New York Latin ACE Award.

On September 30, 2012, Adela Micha received a Honoris Causa degree from the Autonomous and Popular University of Veracruz for "being an example of journalism. Her image and voice are recognized by millions of Mexicans who choose her as an informative option". The "Award" as Micha called the honorary title, was given by the rector of the UPAV, Guillermo Zúñiga Martínez. Other guests at the ceremony were the government secretary of Veracruz, Gerardo Buganza Salmeron and the director of social communication of the government of Veracruz, Georgina Domínguez Colio. It is worth noticing that the degree was given at a time when the governor of that state, Javier Duarte de Ochoa (PRI) has been strongly criticized by the murder of eight journalists in the state since the beginning of his mandate.

At the ceremony Adela Micha was met with discontent by members of the university who demonstrated against her and the way she conducts her daily work by throwing two eggs, one of which struck her shoulder. Both the outgoing president, Felipe Calderón (PAN) and the incoming Enrique Peña Nieto (PRI), condemned the protest in their Twitter accounts.

She has also hosted two radio newscasts (Imagen Informativa Segunda Emisión and Mujeres eligiendo) for Grupo Imagen's Imagen Informativa radio network, conducting and producing a TV newscast (Las Noticias por Adela for Televisa's FOROtv), and writing for the Excélsior Mexican nationwide newspaper.
