= Amanda Cerny =

American internet personality (born 1991)

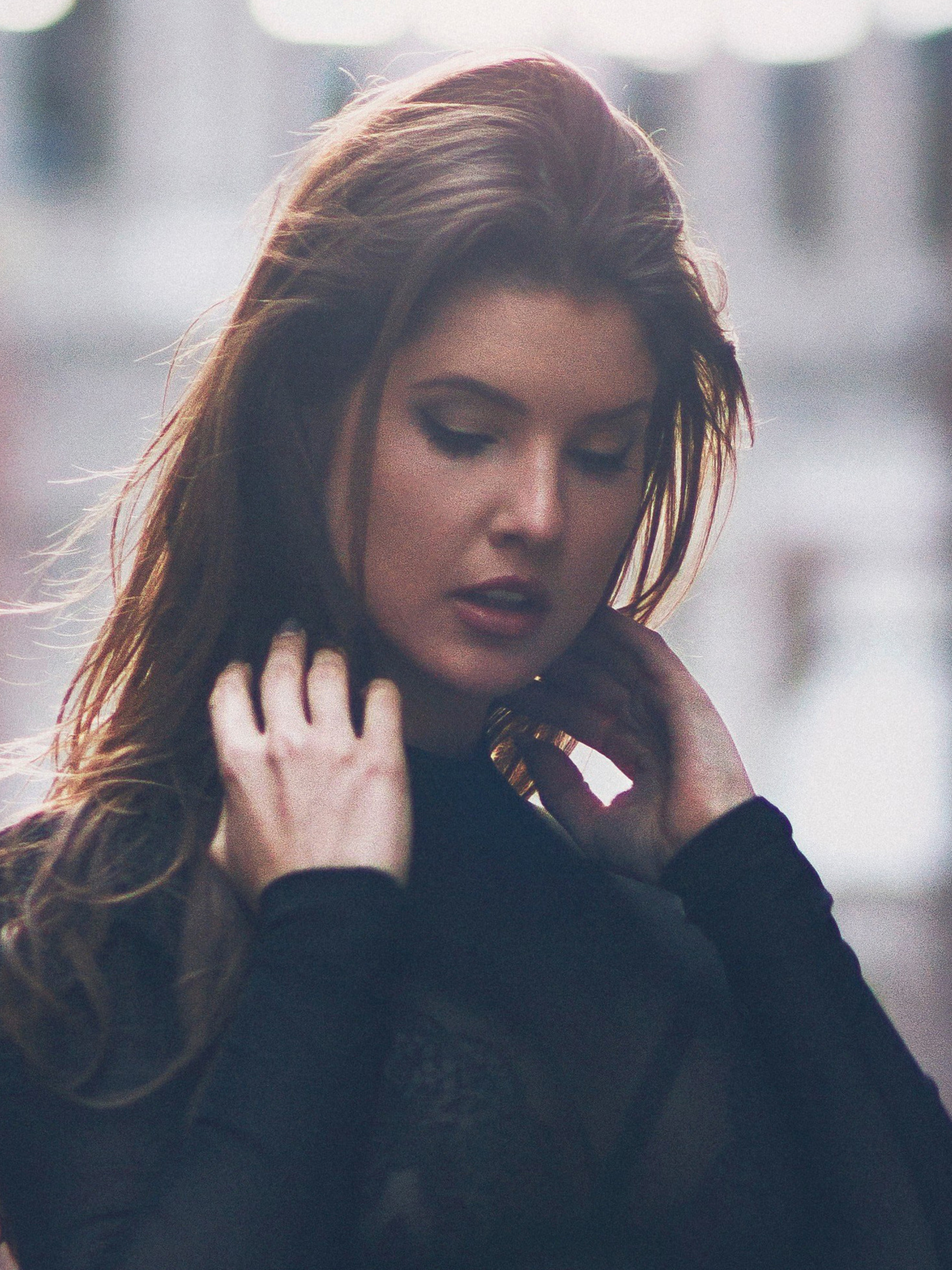
- Cerny in 2018
- Born: Amanda Rachelle Cerny; June 26, 1991 (age 35); Pittsburgh, Pennsylvania, U.S.
- Other name: Mandy
- Education: Florida State University
- Occupations: Actress; model
- Years active: 2013–present
- Children: 2

YouTube information
- Channel: Amanda Cerny
- Years active: 2016–present
- Genres: Comedy; travelling; vlogs
- Subscribers: 2.56 million
- Views: 244 million
- Last updated: November 4, 2026
- Website: amandacerny.com

Signature
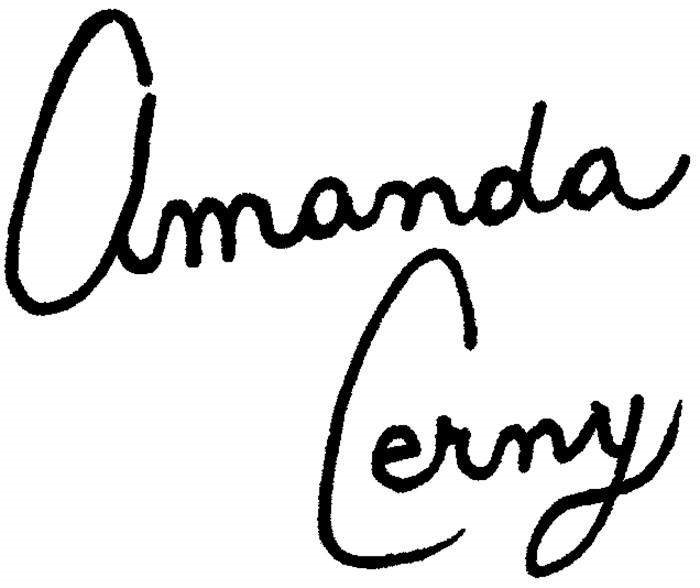

Amanda Rachelle Cerny (born June 26, 1991) is an American internet personality. She is best known for her YouTube channel and formerly her Vine profile on which she had over 4 million followers. She was Playboy magazine's Playmate of the Month for October 2011.

== Early life and background ==
Amanda Rachelle Cerny was born on June 26, 1991, in Pittsburgh, Pennsylvania.

== Career ==
At the age of 15, Cerny began working as a model at the time, as a hobby. At the age of 20, she was featured in Playboy as the Playmate of the Month in the October 2011 edition. Cerny began posting content on Vine, and had over 4.6 million followers. She has since also started a YouTube channel an amassed 2.6 million subscribers on it.

In August 2017, Cerny was named head of music streaming platform LiveXLive's newly formed Digital Talent Division.

In July 2018, Cerny helped create the entertainment subscription network Zeus Network along with King Bach, DeStorm Power and television producer Lemuel Plummer.

== Personal life ==
In October 14, 2025, Cerny announced on her Instagram that she was expecting twins with her boyfriend, Johannes Bartl. On December 18, 2025, they welcomed fraternal twins.

== Filmography ==
Film

Year	Title	Role	Notes
2013	Pain & Gain	Actress	Uncredited role
2014	Just Girly Things		Short
2016	Things Guys Should Be Cool With	Amanda	Short
2016	Internet Famous	Amber Day	
2016	My Big Fat Hispanic Family	Amanda	Short film
2016	The Bet	Mrs. McDoogle	
2016	Mr. and Mrs. Smith Parody	Mrs. Smith	TV Movie
2018	211	Sarah	
2018	Public Disturbance	Rose Farmhouse	
2018	Creed II	Actress	Uncredited role
2019	Airplane Mode	Self	
2019	Rim of the World	Lucy	
2020	Deported	Ashley	
2020	The Babysitter: Killer Queen	Violet	

Television

Year	Title	Role	Notes
2013	Hello Ladies	Melanie	Uncredited role
2016	The Coach Who Clothed Them	Player	TV Movie
2016	Adam Devine's House Party	Leilani	10 episodes
2016	Keeping Up with the Powerpuff Girls	Blossom	Web series; 3 episodes
2016	Lele Pons	Paola, Girl	Web mini-series
2016	The Deleted	Breeda	Web series
2016–2018	King Bachelor's Pad	Self	2 episodes
2017	Dead House	Pretty Zombie Girl #1	
2017	Workaholics	Colleen	Episode: "Bill & Tez's Sexcellent Sexventure"
2018	BB Ki Vines	Lisa	Episode: "Maakichu Mere Bete"
2019	Sober Coach	Aarona	3 episodes
2019	Ryan Hansen Solves Crimes on Television	Self	Episode: "Like and Subscribe"
2021	Trish & Scott	The Ex	Web series; Episode: "Foreign Dad in Town"
2021	iCarly	Harmony	Episode: "iNeed Space"

Music videos

Year	Title	Artist(s)	Refs.
2014	"Homeless in Heathrow"	Fartbarf	
2014	"I Want You"	Bob Sinclar ft. CeCe Rogers	
2016	"Don't Wanna Know"	Maroon 5	
2017	"Boom Boom"	RedOne ft. Daddy Yankee, French Montana, Dinah Jane	
2018	"Prom Queen"	Lil Kloroxxx	
2020	"Where Baby Where"	Gippy Grewal	

Miscellaneous

Year	Title	Type	Role	Notes
2022	Zaya	Podcast	Diane	Episode: "The Plan"
