= Dan Lagana =

American television writer and producer

- Born: Boston, Massachusetts, U.S.
- Occupations: Writer, Producer
- Known for: Co-creator of Zach Stone Is Gonna Be Famous and American Vandal
- Spouse: Emily Kapnek (m. 2008)
- Children: 2

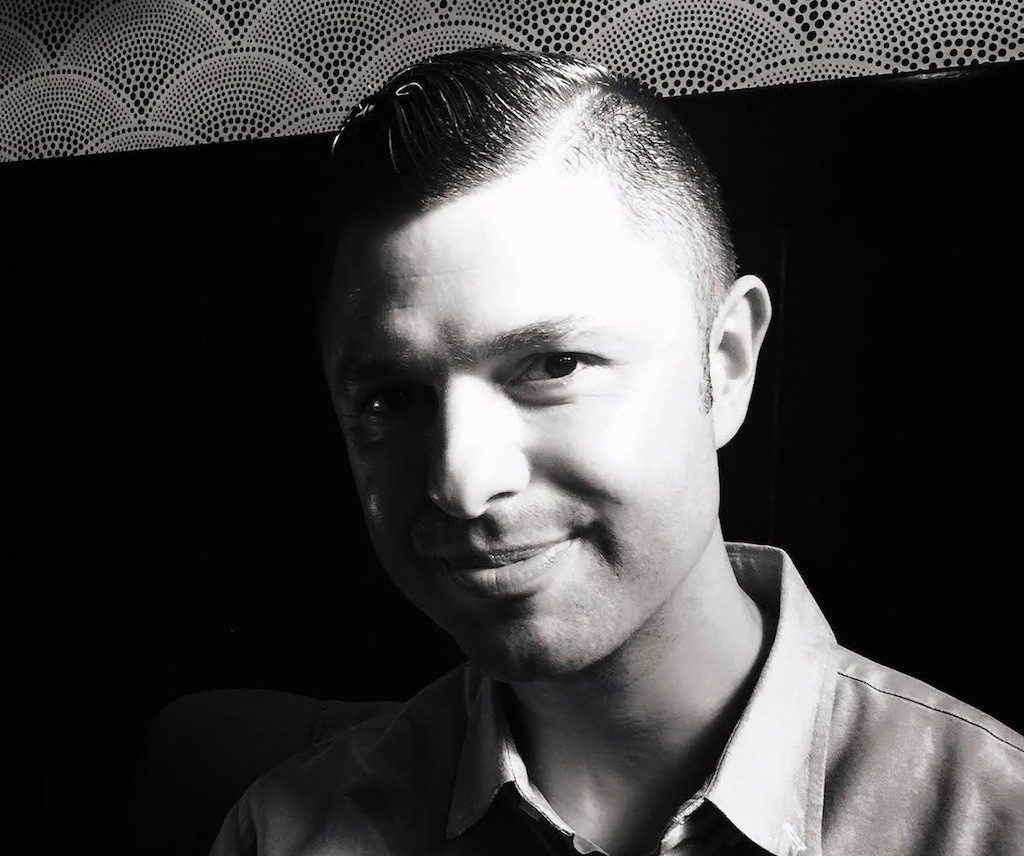
Dan Lagana

Dan Lagana is an American television writer and producer. He is best known for creating the TV series Zach Stone Is Gonna Be Famous on MTV and for serving as showrunner on the Netflix series American Vandal. He has won a Peabody Award.

== Career ==
Lagana served as showrunner (and co-creator) on Zach Stone Is Gonna Be Famous with Bo Burnham on MTV as well as showrunner on Seasons 2 and 3 of Deadbeat, a Hulu comedy TV series. He has developed projects for Fox, CBS, NBC, and a web series for Lionsgate Television. He began his career as a production assistant on the Fox show Malcolm in the Middle.

In 2019, Lagana co-wrote the script for The Babysitter: Killer Queen (2020) for Netflix, starring Judah Lewis, Hana Mae Lee, Robbie Amell, Bella Thorne, Andrew Bachelor, Leslie Bibb, Ken Marino, and Jenna Ortega.

== American Vandal ==
Lagana was the showrunner on Season 1 of American Vandal and returned for Season 2. Vandal was Netflix's most binge-watched show of 2017. On April 19, 2018, American Vandal won a 2017 Peabody Award for Entertainment. In July 2018, it was nominated for a Primetime Emmy Award.

== Personal life ==
Lagana is married to actress, television producer, and writer Emily Kapnek. They have two children, Guy Lagana and Oszkar Nosek.
