= Brian Duffield =

American filmmaker

- Born: November 5, 1985 (age 40); Pennsylvania, United States
- Occupation: Filmmaker
- Years active: 2010–present

Brian Duffield (born November 5, 1985) is an American filmmaker. He wrote and directed the 2020 dark comedy coming-of-age film Spontaneous (2020), the sci-fi horror film No One Will Save You (2023), and the survival thriller film Whalefall (2026). He has also written the screenplays for several films, including The Divergent Series: Insurgent (2015), The Babysitter (2017), Love and Monsters, and Underwater (both 2020). He has had several spec scripts featured on The Black List, an industry log of highly regarded but unproduced screenplays, including Jane Got a Gun (2015) and Your Bridesmaid is a Bitch.

== Early life ==
Duffield was born on November 5, 1985, the son of Brenda and Brian Duffield. He has two sisters and one brother and spent the first nine years of his life in Harrisburg, Pennsylvania. In 1995, he moved with his family to rural Ireland when his parents decided to become evangelical missionaries. He later described the surroundings of the area in which they settled as being completely remote and lacking in popular culture. He attended school in County Kildare; in one classroom, three separate grades were being taught by one teacher, which he described as "very Little House on the Prairie-esque". He moved back to the U.S. upon graduating from high school in 2004.

Duffield graduated from both Temple University and Messiah College in 2008. After graduation, he moved to Universal City, California for a summer internship through Temple University at the Oakwoods apartments prior to the 2007–08 Writers Guild of America strike and at the beginning of the Great Recession. From there, he worked various jobs before becoming a professional screenwriter. His first job in Los Angeles was at the now defunct Storyopolis, a children's book store/art gallery, in Studio City, where he worked with writer Blake Harris. He has also worked as an assistant and script reader within the film industry for several years. Prior to selling his first spec screenplay, Duffield was a temporary employee at the Lucky Brand Jeans factory in nearby Vernon, California.

== Career ==
=== 2012–2020: Screenwriter ===
Duffield's first spec script sale was for Your Bridesmaid is a Bitch to Skydance Media. The story is partially based on his personal experience with his friends' weddings and a slew of failed relationships. His friend from college had sent a copy to a contact at Circle of Confusion management company, who later offered to be Duffield's manager. Several days later, they got a meeting with Skydance, who bought the script. Duffield said: "(It) was something like my tenth script. It was the first one people paid attention to and I haven’t really shown the earlier scripts to anyone in LA." Eli Craig was last attached to direct and rewrite the film in May 2015. Black List Live!, a live monthly stage reading of scripts featured on the Black List, did a performance of Your Bridesmaid is a Bitch in 2014.

Duffield sold his script for Monster Problems to Paramount Pictures in 2012. The film underwent some rewrites by Matthew Robinson and was renamed Love and Monsters before being released in October 2020.

Duffield's first writing assignment was for the film adaptation of the second book in the Divergent trilogy, Insurgent (2015), in 2013.

The script for The Babysitter (2017) was sold to McG's company, Wonderland Sound and Vision, at auction. McG also directed the film, which later premiered on Netflix in October 2017. In 2020, the thriller Underwater starring Kristen Stewart was released. The screenplay was by Duffield and revised by Adam Cozad.

=== 2020–present: Writer-director ===
Later in 2020, Duffield made his writer-director debut with the dark comedy Spontaneous. His next film as a writer-director, No One Will Save You, was released straight-to-streaming in 2023. In 2025, he performed uncredited rewrites of Predator: Badlands and Tron: Ares.

In 2026 he directed an adaptation of Whalefall, the script for which he co-wrote with the novel's writer Daniel Kraus; It was released on October 16, 2026.

He is also set to write and direct Crumble, a film about a married couple who go on a world-traversing adventure in the hope of finding a cure to an ancient curse, for Laika LLC. In 2026, it was announced that Duffield would direct and co-write with Zach Cregger a film based on Trevor Henderson's internet phenomenon Siren Head.

== Personal life ==
Duffield is married. His parents still reside in Ireland.

== Filmography ==
Year	Title	Director	Writer	Producer	Notes
2014	Quarantine	No	Yes	No	Short film
2015	The Divergent Series: Insurgent	No	Yes	No	
2015	Jane Got a Gun	No	Yes	No	
2017	The Babysitter	No	Yes	Executive	
2020	Underwater	No	Yes	No	
2020	Love and Monsters	No	Yes	No	
2020	Spontaneous	Yes	Yes	Yes	
2023	Skull Island	No	Yes	Executive	Animated series (Also creator)
2023	No One Will Save You	Yes	Yes	Yes	
2026	Whalefall	Yes	Yes	Yes	
2027	Skeletons	No	Yes	Executive	

Producer only

- The Babysitter: Killer Queen (2020) (Executive producer)
- Cocaine Bear (2022)
- Borderline (2025)

Additional literary material

- Predator: Badlands (2025)
- Tron: Ares (2025)
