= The Babysitter (2017 film) =

Teen horror-comedy film by McG

- Official release poster
- Directed by: McG
- Written by: Brian Duffield
- Produced by: McG; Mary Viola; Zack Schiller
- Starring: Samara Weaving; Judah Lewis; Hana Mae Lee; Robbie Amell; Bella Thorne
- Cinematography: Shane Hurlbut
- Edited by: Peter Gvozdas; Martin Bernfeld
- Music by: Douglas Pipes
- Production companies: Boies / Schiller Film Group Production; Wonderland Sound and Vision
- Distributed by: Netflix
- Release date: October 13, 2017 (United States)
- Running time: 85 minutes
- Country: United States
- Language: English
- Box office: $404,923

The Babysitter is a 2017 American teen black comedy slasher film directed by McG and written by Brian Duffield. It stars Samara Weaving, Judah Lewis, Hana Mae Lee, Robbie Amell and Bella Thorne. The film follows a lonely 12-year-old boy "Cole" (played by Lewis) who discovers that his babysitter "Bee" (played by Weaving) is part of a satanic cult that wants to kill him. The film was released by Netflix on October 13, 2017, and received mostly positive reviews from critics. A sequel, The Babysitter: Killer Queen, was released on September 10, 2020.

== Plot ==
Freshman high school student Cole is bullied by his neighbor Jeremy, but his babysitter Bee, who is one of his only two friends, stands up for him and scares Jeremy off. The following day, when his parents go out for an overnight stay at a hotel, Bee and Cole spend quality time together until he has to go to bed. Bee offers him some liquor to drink, but he secretly pours it out when she is not looking.

Cole is encouraged by a text from his neighbor and other friend Melanie to go see what Bee gets up to after he goes to sleep. He sees Bee and several of her high school friends (Max, John, Allison, Sonya, and Samuel) playing a game of truth or dare formatted as a game of spin the bottle. However, as Bee kisses Samuel on a dare, she pulls two daggers from behind her back and stabs him in the skull. The others collect Samuel's blood, revealing themselves to be members of a demonic cult. Cole hurries to his room where he calls 911, puts on his shoes, and finds his pocket knife. He pretends to be asleep as Bee and the cult members enter his room to draw a sample of his blood. After they leave, he tries to escape out the window, but Bee secretly hides in his room and waits until Cole passes out from the exhaustion and loss of blood.

Bee and her cult tie Cole to a chair and question him, while fending off his questions by saying they needed his blood for a science project. When two police officers arrive, Max kills one with a poker, causing him to accidentally shoot Allison while Bee slits the other officer's throat. Cole is forced to give the cult the police code to call off the other officers. While Allison cries over being shot, Cole cuts himself free and runs up the stairs; John pursues him, but is pushed over the banister, landing on a trophy that impales his neck, leading him to die from blood loss.

Cole escapes out his bedroom window and hides in the crawlspace under his house. Although Sonya finds him, he traps her in the basement and ignites a firework rocket with bug spray, burning her to death. Max runs into Cole and shows appreciation for his ingenuity, then hears Jeremy egging Cole's house. Max urges Cole to start standing up for himself, which results in Cole getting punched in the face by Jeremy. Max then chases Cole up a tree house; Max is killed when he falls and is hanged by the rope swing. Cole escapes to Melanie's house, but Bee follows him. While hiding in a room, Cole apologizes to Melanie for dragging her into this situation and assures her that he is going to take care of things. He asks Melanie to call the police, then she kisses Cole before he leaves.

Cole returns to his house to find that the evidence of the night's events has been cleaned up. He also finds Allison pretending to be dead; before she can stab Cole with a kitchen knife, Bee kills her with a police officer's shotgun. Bee explains to Cole that she was once insecure like him until she made a deal with the Devil to get whatever she wanted by sacrificing innocent people and spilling their blood on an ancient book while reciting its verses. Since then, she has been traveling from town to town, preying on young boys like him. Although she offers to let him join her cult, Cole refuses and burns the spell book. He rushes to Melanie's house to take her dad's car, and drives it into his house while Bee is distracted by the burning book. After he crashes the car into her, they have one last emotional farewell before Cole climbs out of the wreckage and leaves her to die. As the police and emergency crew arrive, Cole tells his parents that he no longer needs a babysitter.

Later, a firefighter going through Cole's house is attacked by Bee.

== Cast ==
- Samara Weaving as Bee, Cole's attractive babysitter and secret leader of a devil-worshipping cult
- Judah Lewis as Cole, a 12-year-old boy whose parents hire a babysitter when they go out. He lacks self-confidence and is often picked on, but learns to fight back when the cult tries to kill him.
- Hana Mae Lee as Sonya, Bee's goth friend who is part of her cult
- Robbie Amell as Max, Bee's jock friend who is part of her cult
- Bella Thorne as Allison, Bee's cheerleader friend who is part of her cult
- Andrew Bachelor as John, Bee's wisecracking friend who is part of her cult
- Emily Alyn Lind as Melanie, Cole's neighbor and friend, who secretly has a crush on him and encourages him to spy on Bee
- Leslie Bibb as Mom, Cole's mother
- Ken Marino as Dad, Cole's father
- Doug Haley as Samuel, an unfortunate victim of Bee and her cult
- Miles J. Harvey as Jeremy, Cole's bullying neighbor
- Chris Wylde as Juan, Melanie's annoying father
- Carl McDowell as "Big" Carl Davis, school nurse

== Production ==
On November 24, 2014, it was announced that Brian Duffield's horror comedy script The Babysitter had been bought by McG's Wonderland Sound and Vision, with McG and Mary Viola producing the film. The project was brought in by executive producer Steven Bello. In December 2014, the script appeared on the 2014 Black List of the best unproduced scripts in Hollywood. Joe Lynch and Jason Eisener were both in talks to direct the film. On September 10, 2015, McG was attached to direct the film for New Line Cinema, while Wonderland co-financed the film, along with the Boies/Schiller Film Group. Principal photography began on October 27, 2015, in Los Angeles.

== Release ==
In December 2016, Netflix acquired distribution rights to the film from New Line Cinema. It premiered on the service on October 13, 2017.

== Reception ==
On Rotten Tomatoes, the film has an approval rating of 71% based on 28 reviews, with an average rating of 6.6/10. The website's critics consensus reads: "Enjoyable if not particularly original, The Babysitter makes the most of its familiar genre ingredients with energetic direction and a killer cast."

Felix Vasquez Jr. of Cinema Crazed called it: "A great horror comedy with a genuinely touching tale of growing up tucked underneath the buckets of blood, and Satanism." Matt Donato of Dread Central gave it 4 out of 5 and wrote: "McG's hilarious and gruesome occult comedy proves Samara Weaving's worth seventy-billion times over, turning her into the new genre 'it' girl overnight."

William Bibbiani at IGN gave the film 4.8 out of 10, saying "Netflix's The Babysitter doesn't really work as either a horror film or a comedy." Blake Goble at Consequence of Sound panned the film, saying "McG's hyper-referential slasher comedy fails as a horror movie and meta-commentary alike." Furthermore, he called the film "heinous" and suggested various other insults to describe the film, concluding with, "It can't be stated emphatically enough – stay away from The Babysitter."

== Music ==
The film score is composed by Douglas Pipes, who has scored many other horror films. The title song, "The Babysitter", is performed by American singer-songwriter Betty Wright.

== Sequel ==
On September 26, 2019, Netflix announced a sequel to The Babysitter was being produced with McG returning as director and producer. Shortly after the announcement, it was reported that McG, Dan Lagana, Brad Morris and Jimmy Warden would write the screenplay for the sequel. Original cast members Lewis, Weaving, Thorne, Amell, Lee, Bachelor, Lind, Marino, and Bibb also returned. The film was released on Netflix on September 10, 2020.
