= Xiaolong Liu =

Cinematographer

- Born: China
- Occupation: Cinematographer
- Years active: 2013–present

Xiaolong Liu is a cinematographer based in Los Angeles. In 2024, he was featured on Variety's list of 10 Cinematographers to Watch and named one of the "Rising Stars of Cinematography" by the American Society of Cinematographers.

== Early life and career ==
Liu was born in China and raised in Stuttgart, Germany. Early in his career, he worked for one year as a camera production assistant on the German television series SOKO Stuttgart for the network ZDF. He has worked on music videos for Lady Gaga, Beyoncé, Billie Eilish, Kendrick Lamar, Olivia Rodrigo, Travis Scott, the Weeknd, and more.

== Selected filmography ==
=== Film ===
- 2024: Uglies

=== Music video ===
- 2019: 21 Savage: "A Lot"
- 2019: Charlie Puth: "Cheating on You"
- 2021: The Weeknd: "Save Your Tears"
- 2021: Foo Fighters: "Waiting on a War"
- 2021: Justin Bieber: "Hold On"
- 2021: The Weeknd: "Take My Breath"
- 2022: Fivio Foreign, Kanye West, and Alicia Keys: "City of Gods"
- 2022: Sting: "Redlight"
- 2022: The Weeknd: "Out of Time"
- 2023: SZA: "Kill Bill"
- 2023: Olivia Rodrigo: "Get Him Back!"
- 2024: Travis Scott: "Fein"
- 2024: Kendrick Lamar: "Not Like Us"
- 2024: Childish Gambino: "Lithonia"
- 2025: Lady Gaga: "Abracadabra"
- 2025: Haim: "Relationships"
- 2025: Nine Inch Nails: "As Alive as You Need Me to Be"

== Awards and nominations ==
Year	Result	Award	Category	Work	Ref.
2013	Nominated	La Jolla Fashion Film Festival	Best Cinematography	Anatomy of Gravity	
2014	Nominated	La Jolla Fashion Film Festival	Best Cinematography	Source	
2020	Nominated	Camerimage	Best Cinematography	GoldLink: "Joke Ting"	
2021	Nominated	Camerimage	Music Videos Competition	The Weeknd: "Save Your Tears"	
2022	Nominated	Camerimage	Music Videos Competition	The Weeknd: "Out of Time"	
2025	Won	MTV Video Music Awards	Best Cinematography	Kendrick Lamar – "Not Like Us"	
2025	Nominated	MTV Video Music Awards	Best Cinematography	Lady Gaga – "Abracadabra"	
