= Way of the Warrior Kid =

- Promotional poster
- Directed by: McG
- Screenplay by: Will Staples
- Based on: Way of the Warrior Kid by Jocko Willink
- Produced by: McG; Mary Viola; Chris Pratt; Ben Everard; Jocko Willink
- Starring: Chris Pratt; Jude Hill
- Cinematography: Shane Hurlbut
- Music by: Steven Price
- Production companies: Apple Studios; Skydance Media; Wonderland Sound and Vision; Everard Entertainment; Indivisible Productions; FilmNation Entertainment
- Distributed by: Apple TV
- Release date: November 25, 2026
- Running time: 106 minutes
- Country: United States
- Language: English

Way of the Warrior Kid is an upcoming American drama film directed by McG and written by Will Staples. It is based on the 2017 children's novel of the same name by Jocko Willink. It stars Chris Pratt, who also serves as a producer, alongside Jude Hill. In the film, a bullied 11-year-old named Marc (Hill) learns to find his inner warrior over one summer with the help of his Navy SEAL uncle Jake (Pratt).

Way of the Warrior Kid is scheduled to be released on Apple TV on November 25, 2026.

== Premise ==
A bullied 11-year-old named Marc learns to find his inner warrior over one summer with the help of his Navy SEAL uncle Jake.

== Cast ==
- Chris Pratt as Uncle Jake, a Navy SEAL and Sarah's younger brother
- Jude Hill as Marc, Sarah's son
- Linda Cardellini as Sarah, Marc's mom and Jake's older sister
- Levi McConaughey as Kenny
- Ava Torres as Nora
- Darien Sills-Evans as Commander Barnes
- Carl McDowell as Principal Lanzetta
- Parker Young as Kyle
- Timothy Flood as Sketchy Gamer
- Arlan Ruf

== Production ==
In April 2024, a movie adaptation of the novel Way of the Warrior Kid by Jocko Willink was in development, with McG directing and producing, and Will Staples writing the screenplay. Chris Pratt was cast in the lead role. In June, Skydance Media acquired worldwide rights to the film for $80–85 million, also joining it as a production company with distribution rights going to Apple Studios as part of their overall deal with Skydance. In August, Linda Cardellini and Jude Hill joined the cast. In September, Levi McConaughey and Ava Torres were added. In October, Arlan Ruff and Ellis Hobbs IV rounded out the cast.

=== Filming ===
Principal photography and filming began on August 19, 2024 in Los Angeles but largely happened at RSI Locations in Pomona and also some occurred in San Diego. Filming wrapped on October 18, 2024.

== Release ==
Way of the Warrior Kid is scheduled to be released on November 25, 2026. The film was originally scheduled to be released on November 20.
