= The Babysitter: Killer Queen =

2020 comedy horror film by McG

- Official release poster
- Directed by: McG
- Written by: Dan Lagana; Brad Morris; Jimmy Warden; McG
- Based on: Characters by Brian Duffield
- Produced by: McG; Mary Viola; Zack Schiller
- Starring: Judah Lewis; Emily Alyn Lind; Jenna Ortega; Robbie Amell; Andrew Bachelor; Leslie Bibb; Hana Mae Lee; Bella Thorne; Samara Weaving; Ken Marino
- Cinematography: Scott Henriksen
- Edited by: Martin Bernfeld
- Music by: Bear McCreary
- Production companies: Wonderland Sound & Vision; Boies/Schiller Film Group
- Distributed by: Netflix
- Release date: September 10, 2020
- Running time: 101 minutes
- Country: United States
- Language: English

The Babysitter: Killer Queen is a 2020 American black comedy slasher film directed and produced by McG, from a screenplay he wrote with Dan Lagana, Brad Morris, and Jimmy Warden. It is a sequel to the 2017 film The Babysitter and stars Judah Lewis, Emily Alyn Lind, Jenna Ortega, Robbie Amell, Andrew Bachelor, Leslie Bibb, Hana Mae Lee, Bella Thorne, Samara Weaving, and Ken Marino. The film continues the story of Cole Johnson, two years after the events of the first film, who must again fight to ensure his survival after a secret is unburied, as he is hunted by demonic enemies, both old and new. The film was released on September 10, 2020, on Netflix, receiving generally negative reviews from critics. As of November 2023, a sequel was still in development.

== Plot ==
Two years after a satanic cult led by his former babysitter, Bee, tried to kill him, (Note: As depicted in The Babysitter (2017)) Cole Johnson is a junior in high school. He is unable to convince anyone, except for his best friend Melanie, of Bee's life-threatening plot; his parents and most others think he had a psychotic break. After he discovers that his parents have enrolled him in a psychiatric school, he escapes with Melanie, her new boyfriend Jimmy, and their friends Boom-Boom and Diego to attend a lake party.

At the party, Cole witnesses the arrival of new student Phoebe Atwell. Later, Cole's friends play a party game on a boat when Melanie suddenly kills Boom-Boom with a boathook and saves her blood. Melanie, Jimmy, and Diego are revealed as cult members; with Boom-Boom's blood as a sacrifice, they need Cole's blood as an offering of an "innocent" to make their wishes come true. Original cultists Sonya, Allison, Max, and John also appear, having been resurrected so they could partake in the ritual by sunrise. However, Phoebe suddenly appears, looking for gas for her jet ski, and provides Cole with some time to evade the cult members and escape with Phoebe on her jet ski.

Once on land, Cole explains everything to Phoebe, who believes him, while the cultists give chase. Sonya makes the first attempt to kill them, but they end up running her over with a car left by a stranger and decapitate her with a surfboard. The cult gets into an argument after finding Sonya's body and splits into two groups: Allison, Max, and John; Melanie, Jimmy, and Diego. Max and John leave while Allison takes a break. She finds Cole and Phoebe, but they trap her between a narrow wedge of rocks and rip her head off. The two board a boat and drive off, but Max catches the raft attached to the back of the boat and is able to pull himself onto the boat. However, Phoebe sets him on fire with a can of silly string and a lighter, then Cole shreds him with the boat's propeller. Diego and Jimmy supernaturally disintegrate when they attempt to back off from their pursuit of Cole.

Cole and Phoebe arrive at her old family cabin, where they take refuge and hope to wait out the night. In the cabin bunker, Phoebe reveals to Cole that her parents died because she crashed into them in a fatal car accident. Cole comforts her, and the two have sex. Melanie calls Cole's father Archie, who has been searching for him alongside Melanie's father Juan, and fakes being drunk so that he can pick them up, hoping to lure Cole out. Cole and Phoebe come out of the bunker armed with crossbows and John accidentally kills himself when a chandelier crashes on him. Archie gives Cole a sleeping drug so he can take him to his car while Melanie kills Juan with a machete and captures Phoebe.

While stopping for gas, Cole regains consciousness, locks Archie out of the car, and drives back to the lake to save Phoebe. In a cove, Melanie holds Phoebe hostage before Cole shows up and volunteers to be sacrificed. Bee emerges from the water and is revealed to be Phoebe's babysitter who was responsible for the car accident that killed her parents; she made a deal with the Devil to save Phoebe's life in exchange for her soul. Sonya, Allison, Max, and John are resurrected again; the four and Melanie drink Cole's blood mixed with Boom-Boom's blood. However, since Cole has had sex with Phoebe and is therefore no longer "innocent", the ritual backfires and the five melt and disintegrate. Bee, who did not drink the blood, reveals that she orchestrated everything so Phoebe and Cole could unite and defeat the cult, having had a change of heart from Cole's love confession after her initial defeat. However, since Bee is still technically a demon, she drinks the blood and disintegrates to save the two. Archie shows up and, having witnessed Bee's death, finally believes Cole. As the sun rises, Cole and Phoebe embrace and kiss while Archie looks on proudly.

== Cast ==
- Judah Lewis as Cole Johnson, a high school student. He is bullied by his entire school because he tried to convince his classmates about the mysterious incident that happened at his house involving a satanic cult two years ago, which led people to think he is crazy. He also suffers from PTSD and takes multiple medications on a daily basis.
- Emily Alyn Lind as Melanie Cyrus, Cole's best friend and later his arch-enemy.
- Jenna Ortega as Phoebe Atwell, a new student attending Cole's school and the current love interest of Cole.
- Robbie Amell as Max, a resurrected cult member
- Andrew Bachelor as John, a resurrected cult member
- Hana Mae Lee as Sonya, a resurrected cult member
- Bella Thorne as Allison, a resurrected cult member
- Samara Weaving as Bee, secret leader of a devil-worshipping cult and Cole's former babysitter.
- Ken Marino as Archie Johnson, Cole's father
- Leslie Bibb as Phyliss Johnson, Cole's mother
- Chris Wylde as Juan Cyrus, Melanie's father
- Carl McDowell as "Big" Carl Davis
- Maximilian Acevedo as Jimmy, Melanie's boyfriend and fellow cult member
- Juliocesar Chavez as Diego, Melanie and Jimmy's friend and fellow cult member
- Jennifer Foster as Boom-Boom, Melanie, Jimmy and Diego's friend.
- Raymond Patterson as Mr. Nordy, a schoolteacher
- Helen Hong as Principal Highbridge
- Jason Rogel as Officer Phil
- Scott MacArthur as Leeroy, a drifter
- Amanda Cerny as Violet, a store cashier

== Production ==
=== Development ===
In September 2019, it was announced Judah Lewis, Hana Mae Lee, Robbie Amell, Bella Thorne, Andrew Bachelor, Emily Alyn Lind, Leslie Bibb and Ken Marino would reprise their roles from the first film in the sequel, with McG directing from a screenplay by McG, Dan Lagana, Brad Morris and Jimmy Warden, and Wonderland Sound and Vision and Boies/Schiller Film Group co-financing and producing. McG described the story as being based on Faust but with ridiculous jokes like in a Mel Brooks film. In October 2019, Jenna Ortega joined the cast in one of the lead roles.

The corduroy suit worn by Lewis is an homage to Wes Anderson.

=== Filming ===
Principal photography took place on location in Los Angeles, California, in 2019.

== Music ==
Bear McCreary composed the score for the film.

== Release ==
The film was released on Netflix on September 10, 2020. In its debut weekend, the film was the second-most watched item on Netflix.

== Reception ==
Early reviews for The Babysitter: Killer Queen were "leaning negative", with critics calling the film "uninspired" and "embarrassing". On Rotten Tomatoes, the film had an approval rating of 48% based on 42 reviews, with an average rating of 4.9/10. On Metacritic, it has a weighted average score of 22 out of 100, based on reviews from 6 critics, indicating "generally unfavorable" reviews.

Dennis Harvey of Variety wrote: "Fans of the original will no doubt tune-in expecting more high-grade guilty-pleasure fun, only to get way too much of a no-longer-very-good thing instead." Felix Vasquez Jr. of Cinema Crazed called it "flawed but a lot of fun, and has a good time with its gore and grue as the original did".

David Gelmini of Dread Central awarded it a score of 4.5 out of 5, calling it a "worthy sequel with a decent amount of gore and suspense", and praising the performances of the lead actors.

== Sequel ==
In September 2020, McG stated that he had plans for a third and final film to conclude the series, stating that it would depend on the success of Killer Queen. He reiterated that he had a story ready for a third movie but that there was no confirmation from Netflix that a third movie will actually be made.

In November 2023, McG stated that a third movie is still in development and that he is still searching for a "third star" to be in the movie.
