= Playing It Cool =

- Promotional poster
- Directed by: Justin Reardon
- Written by: Chris Shafer; Paul Vicknair
- Produced by: Nicolas Chartier; Craig J. Flores; McG; Mary Viola
- Starring: Chris Evans; Michelle Monaghan
- Cinematography: Jeff Cutter
- Edited by: Catherine Haight
- Music by: Jake Monaco
- Production companies: Voltage Pictures; Wonderland Sound and Vision
- Distributed by: Vertical Entertainment
- Release dates: September 26, 2014 (Estonia); May 14, 2015 (United States)
- Running time: 91 minutes
- Country: United States
- Language: English
- Box office: $1.3 million

Playing It Cool is a 2014 American romantic comedy film directed by Justin Reardon and written by Chris Shafer and Paul Vicknair. The film stars Chris Evans and Michelle Monaghan. The film was released on video on demand on March 31, 2015 before a limited release on May 8, 2015 by Vertical Entertainment. It received generally negative reviews from critics.

== Plot ==
L.A.-based screenwriter Me wants to write action flicks, but his agent insists he write a rom-com first. Having been abandoned by his mother as a child, Me does not believe in love and finds writing about romance difficult. His buddy Scott is obsessed with romantic books and movies. He has long had a crush on a guy who works at a bookshop, hoping his feelings will one day be reciprocated.

His group of friends are all writers. Lyle is still unpublished, Samson is a married graphic novelist, Mallory writes and performs one-woman shows, which she makes them attend. Most are cynical about marriage and love; only Scott is supportive.

Whenever women tell Me they love him, he says he does not think he would be able to reciprocate. Then Me meets Her at a charity event, where they immediately strike up an easy conversation. Me finds himself drawn to Her, but she gets whisked away by her boyfriend ‘Stuffy’. He tries to get her out of his head by hooking up with other women, but for the first time this does not work. He returns to the venue to get her name, but there is no one left to ask. Desperate, he steals the guest book.

Me goes to see his granddad, who tells him to search like Columbo. Me and Scott attend numerous charity events, hoping to run into Her. On one occasion, he is embarrassed when the host puts him on the spot to talk about charity work he claimed to have done. Her happens to be in attendance, and he gets her to agree to a ‘friend date’. When he gives her a lift home, she mentions an upcoming charity event. The next day, Scott is again the only friend who encourages Me to believe in love. The others try to dissuade him, and Mallory is openly hostile.

Me shows up for the event, only to find it is actually her yoga class. Their connection continues to strengthen. Chatting in a café, he asks her about ‘Stuffy.’ She describes him as stable, safe and liked by her family and friends. Her dream wedding is at one of the heart sculptures in San Francisco. Me finally confesses that he ‘likes’ her, but she says this will not change her plan. At home, Me takes out his shoebox and looks at the goodbye post-it note his mother had left him. At handball the next day, his granddad and Scott convince him not to give up on Her. That evening, when he convinces her to go out, she opens up about her dad’s suicide when she was young, and they kiss.

Her calls Me up because she cannot get him out of her head, and before long they end up in bed together. For the first time, he does not feel guilty. Her, on the other hand, leaves feeling bad. She calls again, and everything is going well until his dishonesty about his charity work surfaces and she storms away. Mallory confesses she loves Me when he asks her for help. The next morning, Her wakes him with a call, only to confess she is already engaged.

After his granddad dies, Me gets back on track. He gets over his writer's block and finishes the rom-com. Scott finally gets a date with his crush. Me realizes he has to try to stop the wedding. After a flight to San Francisco, a dash through the airport and a hectic taxi ride to check all of the city's heart sculptures, Me finds Her.

== Cast ==
- Chris Evans as Me
- Michelle Monaghan as Her
- Topher Grace as Scott
- Ioan Gruffudd as Stuffy
- Aubrey Plaza as Mallory
- Martin Starr as Lyle
- Philip Baker Hall as Granddad
- Luke Wilson as Samson
- Anthony Mackie as Bryan

In addition, Ashley Tisdale and Matthew Morrison make cameo appearances as themselves.

== Production ==
=== Pre-production ===
The script for the film was originally titled A Many Splintered Thing and was first on The Black List and was a 2011 finalist for the Nicholl Fellowship.

=== Filming ===
Filming began in late 2012 in Los Angeles and completed in early 2013. The ending scenes were shot in San Francisco. The film was produced by Voltage Pictures and Wonderland Sound and Vision.

== Release ==
The international trailer was released on September 17, 2014.

The film was released in Estonia on September 26, 2014, Latvia on October 17, 2014, South Korea on October 23, 2014 and Romania on December 26, 2014.

On November 5, 2014 it was announced Vertical Entertainment had acquired US distribution rights for the film with a planned 2015 release. In February 2015, the film was released exclusively on DirecTV Cinema. In Canada, on February 27, 2015, the film received a limited release in theatres and was released on video on demand. The film was released on video on demand on March 31, 2015 before a limited release on May 8, 2015.

The film premiered at the Dallas International Film Festival on April 11, 2015.

== Reception ==
=== Critical response ===
On the review aggregator website Rotten Tomatoes, 15% of 27 critics' reviews are positive, with an average rating of 4.1/10. The website's consensus reads: "Playing It Cool pits Chris Evans and Michelle Monaghan's easy chemistry against a screenplay that tries too hard to be quirky and clever, and the results are disappointingly lukewarm." Metacritic, which uses a weighted average, assigned the film a score of 30 out of 100, based on 10 critics, indicating "generally unfavorable" reviews.

=== Box office ===
Playing It Cool grossed $1.3 million at the box office.
