= Uglies (film) =

2024 film by McG

- Release poster
- Directed by: McG
- Screenplay by: Jacob Forman; Vanessa Taylor; Whit Anderson
- Based on: Uglies by Scott Westerfeld
- Produced by: John Davis; Jordan Davis; Robyn Meisinger; Dan Spilo; McG; Mary Viola
- Starring: Joey King; Keith Powers; Chase Stokes; Brianne Tju; Jan Luis Castellanos; Charmin Lee; Laverne Cox
- Cinematography: Xiaolong Liu
- Edited by: Martin Bernfeld; Brad Besser
- Music by: Edward Shearmur
- Production companies: Davis Entertainment; Anonymous Content; Industry Entertainment; Wonderland Sound and Vision
- Distributed by: Netflix
- Release date: September 13, 2024
- Running time: 102 minutes
- Country: United States
- Language: English

Uglies is a 2024 American science fiction drama film directed by McG and written by Jacob Forman, Vanessa Taylor, and Whit Anderson. Based on the novel of the same name by Scott Westerfeld, the plot centers around a future post-apocalyptic dystopian society in which people are considered "ugly" until they become "pretty" by enduring extensive cosmetic surgery at the age of 16. The film stars Joey King, Keith Powers, Chase Stokes, Brianne Tju, Jan Luis Castellanos, Charmin Lee, and Laverne Cox. Uglies was released by Netflix on September 13, 2024, and received negative reviews from critics.

== Plot ==
In the future, the world has fallen into chaos after exhausting all natural resources. To keep humanity alive, scientists first create genetically modified orchids that are a new energy source, and second, a surgical procedure to enhance human beings in both appearance and fitness to prevent prejudice and discrimination. The surgery is performed on "Uglies" when they are sixteen before allowing them to go to the city, where celebrations occur among the "Pretties."

Tally and her best friend Peris are Uglies, but Peris, being three months older, leaves for his surgery first. The two share scars on their hands, which they vow to keep despite the procedure. They also promise to remain friends and meet again.

Tally, anxious to see Peris again, sneaks into the city. She confronts him but discovers that he has become careless, and the scar they vowed to keep is gone. When Tally is discovered, she is chased by the Wardens back to the Uglies' dormitories. Later, she befriends Shay, a rebellious Ugly who tells her about "The Smoke", a land of freedom in tune with nature based on the book Walden by Henry David Thoreau. Shay encourages Tally to come with her, reject the surgery, and seek out The Smoke and its leader, David. Tally refuses.

On her sixteenth birthday, Tally is denied her procedure until she tells Dr. Cable, the operations leader, where Shay is. She is told that David is dangerous, will hurt Shay, and that he is also building a weapon to destroy the city. Tally is sent as a spy into The Smoke, reunites with Shay, and meets David.

The Smoke reveals the orchid energy source is toxic to nature, so "The Smoke" rebels set them on fire to wipe them out. Tally and David share a moment, and she tosses her tracker into the fire after renouncing the system and rejecting her chance to become a Pretty.

As she begins to grow close with David, he and his family reveal the truth about the surgeries: they limit human free will and thought, so the Pretties are easily controlled. A select few are given a cure to become the scientists surrounding the scheme. David's parents worked as some of those scientists until they discovered the truth and fled. Ever since, they have been working to develop the cure.

Her active tracker signals Dr Cable, who arrives with troops to round up the rebels. Peris, modified to be an enhanced soldier, kills David's father by rapidly snapping his neck, and Tally is revealed to The Smoke to be the traitor. Despite David's initial anger at her, Tally is successful in convincing David to take her with him to free the captured rebels, who are held in a lab facility.

Tally, David, and some of Tally's friends make a plan to rescue the captured rebels. Tally's friends create a diversion that allows Tally and David to arrive where the rebels are held. Everyone is liberated except Shay, who has already undergone her procedure. Completely changed and oblivious to her previous cause, she is taken with the rebels to a safe spot. When Peris confronts the team, Tally tries to get through to his true personality. Although Peris shows promise, as Peris touches Tally's face, David, recalling how Peris killed his father, throws Peris off a building into rubble to his death.

While escaping, David's mother reveals she stole the final piece of her cure. Yet, she does not want to administer it to Shay as she's unwilling. Tally volunteers to undergo the surgery and test the cure. She swears she will not let being Pretty change her drive for justice. She bids David and her friends goodbye.

Later, Tally is seen living as a Pretty in the city with all comforts, but she has kept her promise, as her scar still remains.

== Cast ==
- Joey King as Tally Youngblood
- Brianne Tju as Shay
- Keith Powers as David
- Chase Stokes as Peris
- Laverne Cox as Dr. Cable
- Charmin Lee as Maddy
- Jay DeVon Johnson as Az
- Jan Luis Castellanos as Croy

== Production ==
In 2006, a feature film adaptation of Uglies was announced to be in development when 20th Century Fox purchased the film rights to the novel, with John Davis attached as producer. In September 2020, the project re-entered development with Joey King signing on to star in the lead role as Tally Youngblood and serve as executive producer for the film. King signed onto the project, after previously being a fan of the Uglies novels.

McG signed on to direct, while Krista Vernoff was hired to write the script. John Davis, Jordan Davis, Robyn Meisinger, Dan Spilo, McG, and Mary Viola produced. The project is a joint-venture production between Davis Entertainment Company, Anonymous Content, Industry Entertainment, and Wonderland Sound and Vision. Later that year, Keith Powers, Brianne Tju, Chase Stokes, and Laverne Cox joined the supporting cast. In February 2022, King revealed that production had already finished, and had taken place in Atlanta in December 2021.

== Release ==
Uglies was released on Netflix on September 13, 2024. The film amassed 20 million views in its first three days (September 13–15).

== Reception ==
On the review aggregator website Rotten Tomatoes, 14% of 56 critics' reviews are positive, with an average rating of 3.5/10. The website's consensus reads: "It's what's on the inside that counts, but unfortunately Uglies doesn't have much going on in there, either." Metacritic, which uses a weighted average, assigned the film a score of 34 out of 100, based on 15 critics, indicating "generally unfavorable" reviews.

The A.V. Club's Jacob Oller gave the film a D− grade, writing, "Though the book came out before your Divergents and your Hunger Games and your Maze Runners, Uglies' adaptation suffers from being nearly two decades too late. It would be like taking your mining equipment to California now, promising your concerned loved ones that there's still gold in them thar hills. Even if Uglies was watchable, its tropes have been worn down to nubs and its themes wrung dry." Adrian Horton of The Guardian gave it 1/5 stars, writing, "Though it supposedly argues against human beings turned into synthetic quasi-droids, Uglies feels like just another throwaway product."

Frank Scheck of The Hollywood Reporter wrote, "It's all about as familiar-feeling as it sounds, but it goes down easily thanks to McG's skillful, fast-paced direction, the imaginatively lavish CGI-enhanced visuals, and King's impressive performance." The Wall Street Journal's John Anderson said, "It feels a bit infantile, never mind petty, to go looking for literary-theological heft in a project so clearly directed at the blushingly young, or to begrudge them an indulgence like Uglies."

== Future ==
In September 2024, author Scott Westerfeld expressed interest in the realization of sequel movies. Confirming the potential for an ongoing film series, the author stated that adaptations of the Uglies and its follow-up series Imposters are optioned to the associated studios.
