= When We First Met =

- Film release poster
- Directed by: Ari Sandel
- Written by: John Whittington
- Produced by: Adam Saunders; Mason Novick; Mary Viola; Michelle Knudsen; McG
- Starring: Adam DeVine; Alexandra Daddario; Shelley Hennig; Andrew Bachelor; Robbie Amell
- Cinematography: David Hennings
- Edited by: Jeffrey Wolf
- Music by: Eric V. Hachikian
- Production companies: Footprint Features; MXN Entertainment; Wonderland Sound and Vision
- Distributed by: Netflix
- Release date: February 9, 2018
- Running time: 97 minutes
- Country: United States
- Language: English
- Budget: $9.5 million

When We First Met is a 2018 American romantic comedy film directed by Ari Sandel, written by John Whittington, and starring Adam DeVine, Alexandra Daddario, Shelley Hennig, Andrew Bachelor and Robbie Amell.

Noah Avery meets Avery Martin at a Halloween party and falls in love at first sight, but soon gets friend-zoned. So, upon inadvertently discovering a type of time machine on her engagement three years later, he gets into a time loop trying to win her heart.

It was released worldwide on Netflix on February 9, 2018.

== Plot ==
Noah Ashby is in love with beautiful Avery Martin after meeting her at a 2014 Halloween party, but she regards him as a friend. Avery meets her fiancé Ethan the day after she and Noah met. Three years later, Noah remains distraught at not having been able to win her over.

When he becomes intoxicated at Ethan and Avery's engagement party, Noah winds up in the photo booth he used with her on their first meeting and drunkenly operates it before falling asleep. Awakening in bed, Noah discovers the photo booth brought him back to the day they met and he resolves to change the events of the day to ensure he and Avery end up together.

Noah uses his pre-existing knowledge of Avery to his advantage in his first attempt to win her over, but she and her roommate Carrie Grey suspect him of being a stalker, and he returns to a new version of 2017 where he and Avery do not know each other. For his second attempt traveling back to 2014, Noah follows his friend Max's advice of being a rude alpha male and successfully beds Avery, but he develops a self-absorbed personality and when he returns to the present, his relationship with Avery is purely sexual.

Recognizing that Avery and Ethan are still attracted to each other, Noah has a conversation with Carrie and deduces that Avery is attracted to stable and dependable men. Noah gets a job at Max's company and presents himself in a more mature manner to Avery for his third attempt. When he returns to 2017, he and Avery live in a big house and are engaged.

However, his friendship with Max has soured because he took the senior vice president position that Max was working towards, his job commitments prevent him from spending time with Avery, and Ethan is now distraught over her marrying someone else. Following another conversation with Carrie, Noah recognizes that Avery does not love him and she is meant to be with Ethan. He also realizes that, having bonded with Carrie during his time travel adventures, he is meant to be with her.

Traveling back to 2014 for a fourth time, Noah arranges for Avery and Ethan to meet at the Halloween party while he pursues Carrie, whom he discovers he has more in common with than Avery. His actions restore Ethan and Avery's engagement and his friendship with Max, but he learns that he did not win Carrie's love and she resumed dating her ex-boyfriend Phil.

Noah finally realizes that he needed to first become friends with Avery in order to meet Carrie. So, he travels back one last time to meet Avery the way he did originally. With the present fully restored, Noah initiates a conversation with Carrie at the engagement party and the two begin their own relationship.

== Cast ==
- Adam DeVine as Noah Ashby
- Alexandra Daddario as Avery Martin
- Shelley Hennig as Carrie Grey
- Andrew Bachelor as Max
- Robbie Amell as Ethan
- Dean J. West as Josh
- Tony Cavalero as the Angus Young partygoer
- Chris Wylde as Mr. Costigan
- Noureen DeWulf as Margo

== Production ==
In May 2016, Ari Sandel was set to direct the film from a script by John Whittington and Adam DeVine, while producers on the film are Adam Saunders of Footprint Features, Mason Novick of MXN Entertainment, with Mary Viola and McG of Wonderland Sound and Vision.

Principal photography on the film began in mid-July 2016 in New Orleans.

== Reception ==
On the review-aggregation website Rotten Tomatoes, the film has an approval rating of 43% based on 23 reviews, with an average rating of 5/10. The critical consensus reads: "Much like its protagonist, When We First Met struggles in the cinematic 'friend zone' -- and will face a slew of viewer breakups before finding much in the way of true love." On Metacritic, the film has a weighted average score of 36 out of 100, based on six critics, indicating "generally unfavorable reviews".

Decider writer Lea Palmeri said, "DeVine's ability to be charming and endearing shouldn't be underestimated here and you'll be rooting for him before you know it." Ravi Teja of Age of the Nerd stated that he "carries the whole movie on his shoulders with perfection."

== See also ==
- List of films featuring time loops
- List of films set around Halloween
