= Emily Alyn Lind =

American actress (born 2002)

- Lind in 2026
- Born: May 6, 2002 (age 24); New York City, U.S.
- Occupation: Actress
- Years active: 2008–present
- Mother: Barbara Alyn Woods
- Relatives: Natalie Alyn Lind (sister); Alyvia Alyn Lind (sister)

Emily Alyn Lind (born May 6, 2002) is an American actress. She began her career as a child actress, when she was known for her recurring role as young Amanda Clarke on the ABC series Revenge, and for her role as Ariel on the CBS medical drama Code Black. Lind has also starred in the Netflix original films The Babysitter and The Babysitter: Killer Queen as Melanie, the theatrical film Doctor Sleep as Snakebite Andi, and Ghostbusters: Frozen Empire as Melody. From 2021 to 2023, she starred as Audrey Hope in the HBO Max teen drama series Gossip Girl. In 2025 she starred as Cady Sinclair Eastman in the Prime teen prestige drama series We Were Liars.

== Early life and education ==
Emily Alyn Lind was born on May 6, 2002, in Brooklyn, the daughter of producer and assistant director John Lind and actress Barbara Alyn Woods. Her older sister, Natalie Alyn Lind, and younger sister, Alyvia Alyn Lind, are also actresses.

== Career ==
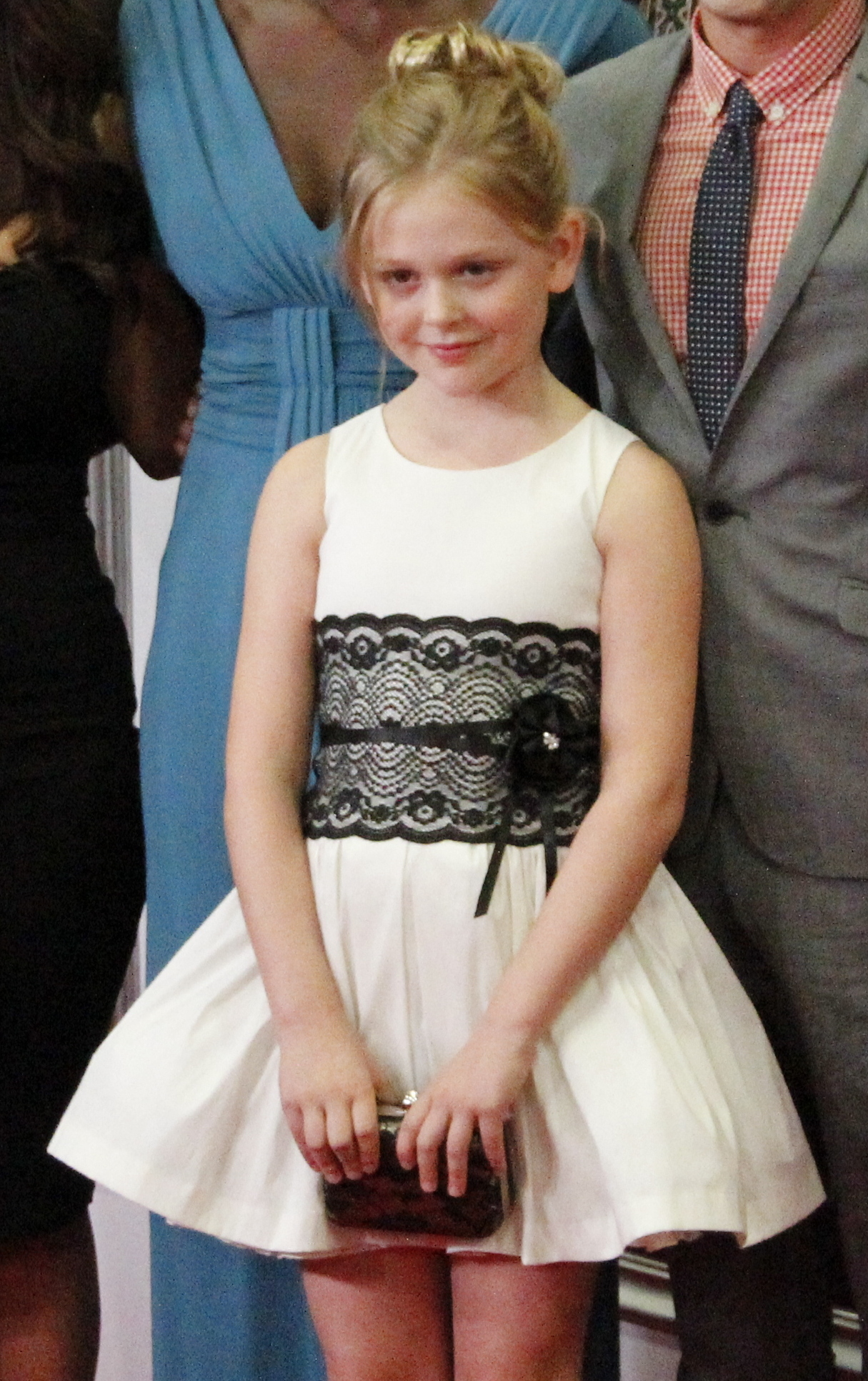
Emily at the Won't Back Down NYC premiere (2012)

Lind made her film debut as a child actress in 2008 in The Secret Life of Bees. Since then she has appeared in such films as Dear Dumb Diary, Enter the Void, J. Edgar, The Haunting in Connecticut 2: Ghosts of Georgia, and Movie 43. She has played Emma Lavery in the soap opera All My Children.

Lind has had recurring roles in the ABC television series Revenge as young Amanda Clarke, as well as in the ABC television series Eastwick as Emily Gardener. She has also appeared in such series as Days of Our Lives, Medium, Flashpoint, Criminal Minds, Suburgatory, and Hawaii Five-0. In 2017, Lind was promoted to a starring role on the CBS medical drama Code Black for the series' third season, after appearing as the character of Ariel during the show's first two seasons.

Lind starred as Melanie in the comedy horror film, The Babysitter, which was released on Netflix in 2017. She reprised her role in the sequel, The Babysitter: Killer Queen. In 2018, Lind was cast as Snakebite Andi in the 2019 film Doctor Sleep, based on the 2013 Stephen King novel and sequel to The Shining.

In March 2020, it was announced that Lind was set to star in the HBO Max teen drama Gossip Girl, which debuted in 2021 and ran for two seasons. She also played ghost girl Melody in Ghostbusters: Frozen Empire released in 2024.

On May 30, 2024, it was announced that she was cast as Cadence Sinclair Eastman, the protagonist of the series We Were Liars, adapted from E. Lockhart's book of the same name.

== Filmography ==
=== Film ===
Key
†	Denotes films that have not yet been released

Year	Title	Role	Notes
2008	The Secret Life of Bees	Young Lily Owens	
2009	Enter the Void	Little Linda	
2010	Blood Done Sign My Name	Julie Tyson	
2011	J. Edgar	Shirley Temple	
2012	Won't Back Down	Malia Fitzpatrick	
2013	The Haunting in Connecticut 2: Ghosts of Georgia	Heidi Wyrick	
2013	All American Christmas Carol	Young Cindy	
2013	Movie 43	Birthday Girl	Segment: "Beezel"
2014	Jackie & Ryan	Lia	
2014	Mockingbird	Abby	
2015	Hidden	Zoe	
2016	Lights Out	Teen Sophie	
2017	The Babysitter	Melanie Cyrus	
2018	Replicas	Sophie Foster	
2019	Doctor Sleep	Snakebite Andi	
2020	The Babysitter: Killer Queen	Melanie Cyrus	
2021	Every Breath You Take	Daphne Fragg	
2024	Ghostbusters: Frozen Empire	Melody	
2025	Chapter 51	Effy Mankiewicz	
2026	Pretty Babies	Marie	
2026	Company		
	The Further Mis-Adventures of Cliff Booth		
TBA	Speed-the-Plow †	Karen	Post-production

=== Television ===
Key
†	Denotes television productions that have not yet been released

Year	Title	Role	Notes
2009	Days of Our Lives	Grace	1 episode
2009	Eastwick	Emily Gardener	Recurring role, 5 episodes
2010	Who Is Clark Rockefeller?	Reigh "Snooks" Boss	Television film
2010	Medium	6-year-old Girl	Episode: "There Will Be Blood... Type B"
2010	All My Children	Emma Lavery	Recurring role
2010	Flashpoint	Young Alexis	Episode: "Jumping at Shadows"
2010	Criminal Minds	Ana Brooks	Episode: "Into the Woods"
2010	November Christmas	Vanessa Marks	Television film
2010	Sundays at Tiffany's	Young Jane Claremont	Television film
2011	Prep & Landing: Naughty vs. Nice	Grace Goodwin	Voice role; television short
2011–2015	Revenge	Young Amanda Clarke	Recurring role, 17 episodes
2012	Beautiful People	Tina	Television film
2012	Hawaii Five-0	Lucy	Episode: "Huaka'i Kula"
2013	Untitled Larry Dorf/Ben Falcone Project	Hannah	Unsold television pilot
2013	Dear Dumb Diary	Jamie Kelly	Television film
2014	Suburgatory	Nadia Nergen	Episode: "No, You Can't Sit with Us"
2014	Mind Games	Della	Episode: "Embodied Cognition"
2015–2018	Code Black	Ariel	Recurring role (seasons 1–2); main role (season 3)
2016	Rush Hour	Cristin Sanders	Episode: "Prisoner of Love"
2021–2023	Gossip Girl	Audrey Hope	Main role
2025–present	We Were Liars	Cadence "Cady" Sinclair Eastman	Main role

== Awards and nominations ==
Year	Association	Category	Title	Result	Ref
2011	National Youth Arts Awards	Outstanding Supporting Actress – Junior Division (Film & Television)	November Christmas	Won	
2012	Young Artist Awards	Best Performance in a TV Series – Recurring Young Actress Ten and Under	Revenge	Won	
2012	Young Artist Awards	Best Performance in a Voice-Over Role – Young Actress	Prep & Landing: Naughty vs. Nice	Nominated	
