= 3 Days to Kill =

2014 international action thriller film by McG

- Theatrical release poster
- Directed by: McG
- Screenplay by: Luc Besson; Adi Hasak
- Story by: Luc Besson
- Produced by: Ryan Kavanaugh; Marc Libert
- Starring: Kevin Costner; Amber Heard; Hailee Steinfeld; Connie Nielsen
- Cinematography: Thierry Arbogast
- Edited by: Audrey Simonaud
- Music by: Guillaume Roussel
- Production companies: EuropaCorp; Wonderland Sound and Vision
- Distributed by: EuropaCorp Distribution (France); Relativity Media (United States)
- Release dates: 12 February 2014 (Los Angeles); 21 February 2014 (United States); 19 March 2014 (France)
- Running time: 117 minutes
- Countries: France; United States; Serbia
- Languages: English; French; German
- Budget: $28 million
- Box office: $53.3 million

3 Days to Kill is a 2014 action thriller film directed by McG and written by Luc Besson and Adi Hasak. Starring Kevin Costner, Amber Heard, Hailee Steinfeld, and Connie Nielsen, the film tells the story of a dangerous international spy (Costner) dying of brain cancer who is determined to retire and rebuild his relationship with his estranged wife (Nielsen) and daughter (Steinfeld). Offered an experimental drug that could save his life in exchange for completing one last job, he finds himself having to juggle his two toughest assignments yet: hunting down the world's most ruthless terrorist and looking after his teenage daughter for the first time in ten years while his wife is out of town.

The movie was released on 21 February 2014, received mixed reviews, and grossed $53.3 million against its $28 million budget.

== Plot ==
American CIA agent Ethan Renner works with a team to capture the Albino, the lieutenant to an arms trafficker (called the Wolf) who is selling a dirty bomb to terrorists in a hotel in Belgrade. The Albino deduces the trap when he recognizes one of Renner's fellow agents (disguised as a chambermaid), whom he kills. Renner, suddenly dizzy as he pursues the Albino, only manages to cripple him by shooting him in the leg, then blacks out, allowing the Albino to escape. Meanwhile, elite CIA assassin Vivi Delay, a "Top Shelf agent", has been personally assigned by the Director to kill the Wolf. Vivi monitors the operation and suspects Renner has unknowingly seen the Wolf.

Renner is nearly disabled by an extreme cough, which is diagnosed as terminal glioblastoma cancer that has spread to his lungs. He is only given a few months to live and will not survive until the following Christmas. For decades he has kept his dangerous career a carefully guarded secret from his wife Christine and daughter Zooey, at the cost of losing them. He decides to spend his remaining time trying to fix his relationship with his estranged daughter, and if possible, his ex-wife. He returns to Paris, where he and his family live separately, to find the African family of Jules is squatting in his apartment. The police tell him that he is not permitted to evict indigent squatters until after the winter. He makes an awkward reconnection with Christine and tells her of his terminal illness. She allows him to reconnect with Zooey, and when she has to go out of the country on business, she agrees to let him look after Zooey.

Vivi recruits him to find and kill the Wolf, in exchange for an experimental drug that could extend his life significantly. Renner reluctantly accepts, to get more time with his family. Vivi tells him the way to trap the Wolf is by getting the Albino, in turn by getting his accountant, and in turn by kidnapping the gang's limousine driver. All the while Renner is fighting the hallucinogenic effect of the medicine, which occurs whenever his heart rate goes too high, and which he can only control by consuming alcohol. He must also deal with Zooey's school problems, including her habit of lying so she can sneak out partying. He manages to keep her out of trouble and slowly reestablishes a father/daughter relationship with her, which impresses his wife.

He tracks the Wolf and the Albino into the subway. However, they gain the upper hand when he is disabled by the hallucinations. The Albino attempts to kill him by pushing him in front of an oncoming train, but Renner manages to push the Albino on the track instead. The Wolf escapes and contacts a business partner who can help him to flee the country.

The family is invited to a party thrown by Zooey's boyfriend's father who happens to be the Wolf's business partner. Renner manages to protect Christine and Zooey, kill all the Wolf's men, and trap the Wolf in an elevator before breaking the cables, causing the cabin to free-fall to the ground. The Wolf survives, severely injured, but Renner is again disabled and, also feeling guilty for all the damage his work has done to his family, he is suddenly unable to pull the trigger, and drops his gun where the Wolf can get it. Vivi intervenes and kicks the gun back to Renner, telling him to finish the job and kill the Wolf, but he decides not to, because "I promised my wife I'd quit." Vivi then kills the Wolf.

At last retired, Renner survives to Christmas, which he spends at a beach house with Zooey and Christine. He discovers a small, red-wrapped gift package containing another vial of the cancer medicine. Vivi is seen on a hill behind the house smiling as Renner opens the package.

== Cast ==
- Kevin Costner as CIA Agent Ethan Renner
- Amber Heard as CIA Agent Vivi Delay, an elite CIA agent
- Hailee Steinfeld as Zooey Renner, Ethan's estranged sixteen-year-old daughter
- Connie Nielsen as Christine Renner, Ethan's ex-wife
- Richard Sammel as Wolfgang "The Wolf" Braun, German arms trafficker
- Marc Andréoni as Mitat Yilmaz
- Eriq Ebouaney as Jules, an African man whose family squats in Ethan's apartment
- Tómas Lemarquis as "The Albino", the Wolf's lieutenant
- Raymond J. Barry as The CIA Director
- Jonathan Barbezieux as Louis
- Jonas Bloquet as Hugh, Zooey's boyfriend
- Rupert Wynne-James as Hugh's Father

== Production ==
On 7 August 2012, Deadline reported that Kevin Costner had been offered the role of Ethan Renner, a government assassin in the McG-directed film. The film, set in France, was scripted by Luc Besson and Adi Hasak, with EuropaCorp having produced while Relativity Media had North American rights. On 2 October 2012, it was confirmed that actor Costner had closed the deal to star as the lead in the film. On 29 November 2012, Hailee Steinfeld joined the cast of the film as the female lead, and the film began production in early 2013. On 13 December, Amber Heard also joined the cast. Later, on 7 January 2013, Connie Nielsen was added to the cast.

=== Filming ===
On 7 January 2013, crews were filming scenes in Paris and Belgrade, and shooting wrapped in April. Some scenes in Paris were filmed in the studios and in the central nave of the Cité du Cinéma, founded by Luc Besson in Saint-Denis. Scenes in Belgrade were filmed in front of Hotel Jugoslavija.

== Release and reception ==
On 31 January 2013, photos from the film set were released. In November 2013, stills from the film were released. On 17 December 2013, the studio released the first trailer and the poster for the film. On 30 January 2014, Relativity released a new Super Bowl 2014 spot.

On 28 May 2013, Relativity set a release date of 14 February 2014 for the film. Later, on 30 October, the film's date was shifted back a week, to 21 February 2014.

=== Box office ===
3 Days to Kill grossed $12.2 million in its opening weekend across 2,872 theaters, finishing in second place behind The Lego Movie ($31.3 million). The film grossed a domestic total of $30.7 million and an international total of $22.6 million, bringing its total gross to $53.3 million.

=== Critical response ===
3 Days to Kill holds a 27% approval rating on Rotten Tomatoes, based on 124 reviews with an average rating of 4.6/10. The site's consensus states: "3 Days to Kill uneasily mixes technically accomplished action sequences with an underdeveloped family conflict." On Metacritic, the film has a score of 40 out of 100, based on 30 critics, indicating "mixed or average" reviews. Audiences surveyed by CinemaScore gave the film a grade B on a scale of A to F.

Geoff Berkshire of Variety wrote: "The lukewarm family dynamics sit awkwardly alongside equally underwhelming action sequences."

Mark Kermode in The Guardian gave the film one star out of five, describing it as "pitiful".
