= True Lies (TV series) =

American action television series

- Genre: Action; Comedy drama
- Created by: Matt Nix
- Based on: True Lies by James Cameron; La Totale! by; Claude Zidi; Simon Michaël; Didier Kaminka
- Starring: Steve Howey; Ginger Gonzaga; Mike O'Gorman; Erica Hernandez; Annabella Didion; Lucas Jaye; Omar Miller
- Country of origin: United States
- Original language: English
- No. of seasons: 1
- No. of episodes: 13

Production
- Executive producers: Anthony Hemingway; Matt Nix; James Cameron; Rae Sanchini; McG; Mary Viola; Corey Marsh; Josh Levy
- Running time: 43 minutes
- Production companies: Flying Glass of Milk Productions; Lightstorm Entertainment; Wonderland Sound and Vision; Anthony Hemingway Productions; 20th Television

Original release
- Network: CBS
- Release: March 1 – May 17, 2023

True Lies is an American action/comedy drama television series created by Matt Nix, based on the 1994 film of the same name by James Cameron, itself based on the 1991 French film La Totale! by Claude Zidi, Simon Michaël, and Didier Kaminka. It was produced by Lightstorm Entertainment, Wonderland Sound and Vision, Anthony Hemingway Productions and 20th Television and aired from March 1 to May 17, 2023, on CBS. In May 2023, after proving to be a ratings bomb for CBS, the series was canceled after one season.

== Premise ==
The series revolves around a suburban housewife who discovers her computer consultant husband is a skilled international spy, which leads them to saving the world and their marriage.

== Cast ==
=== Main ===
- Steve Howey as Harry Tasker
- Ginger Gonzaga as Helen Tasker
- Mike O'Gorman as Luther Tenet
- Erica Hernandez as Maria Ruiz
- Annabella Didion as Dana Tasker
- Lucas Jaye as Jake Tasker
- Omar Miller as Albert "Gib" Gibson Jr.

=== Guest ===
- Carlo Rota as Francois
- Andy Martin as Mikkel Rand
- Beverly D'Angelo as Director Susan Trilby
- Andrea Laing as Cherry
- Deneen Tyler as Mrs. Myers
- Liann Pattison as Donna
- Ray Gaspard as Lawrence
- Franco Castan as Taxi Driver
- Christian Juru as Valet
- John Jabaley as Fred
- Jenny Mercein as Professor Gilpin
- Jeremy Dean as Construction Crew Leader
- Jackson Hurst as Harold
- Matthew Lillard as Nathan "The Wolf"
- Tom Arnold as Arnie Orwig, Retired Omega Operative
- Keith David as Albert "Al" Gibson Sr.
- Tom Connolly as Ian Young
- Vanessa Lengies as Quinn, OMEGA Engineer
- Kate Vernon as Sharon Heinz, Retired Omega Operative
- Jacqueline Grace Lopez as Eva
- Alex Fernandez as Lance Dale
- Charlie Nix as Max, a teen hacker & Dana's Boyfriend

== Episodes ==
No.	Title	Directed by	Written by	Original release date	Prod. code	U.S. viewers (millions)
1	"Pilot"	Anthony Hemingway	Matt Nix	March 1, 2023	1HJC01	3.23
Harry Tasker has spent years away from home as a computer salesman for Telonyx Solutions, while in reality, he's been moonlighting as a top-tier government operative for a clandestine U.S. counter-terrorism unit, Omega Sector. When his wife, Helen Tasker suspects he's been cheating, Harry invites her to Paris, France, for a date to prove he isn't cheating on her until unexpected circumstances force him to reveal his spy life.
2	"Public Secrets"	Robert McNeill	Matt Nix	March 8, 2023	1HJC02	2.60
Now aware of her husband's double life, Helen is automatically recruited to Omega Sector and soon deployed on her first mission: finding a female cryptographer or codebreaker who can decode encrypted information about a planned bio-terrorist attack, and who turns out to be Harry's former fling.
3	"Separate Pairs"	Anna Mastro	Matt Nix	March 15, 2023	1HJC03	2.58
4	"Rival Companions"	Scott Peters	Kathryn Price & Nichole Millard	March 22, 2023	1HJC04	2.58
5	"Unrelated Parents"	David Barrett	John Swetnam	March 29, 2023	1HJC06	2.60
6	"Working Vacation"	Ryan Zaragoza	Jim Garvey	April 5, 2023	1HJC05	2.36
7	"Independent Dependents"	Jay Karas	Minoti Vaishnav & Kris Crenwelge	April 12, 2023	1HJC08	2.68
8	"Honest Manipulations"	Mary Lou Belli	Kathryn Price & Nichole Millard	April 19, 2023	1HJC09	2.62
9	"Bitter Sweethearts"	Aprill Winney	Justice Hardy & Yancey Wang	April 26, 2023	1HJC10	2.75
10	"Friendly Enemies"	Gina Lamar	Valentina L. Garza	May 3, 2023	1HJC07	2.14
11	"Unfamiliar Partnerships"	Geoff Shotz	John Swetnam	May 10, 2023	1HJC11	2.07
12	"Lying Truths"	Mary Lou Belli	Valentina L. Garza	May 17, 2023	1HJC12	2.03
13	"Waking Dreams"	Matt Nix	Matt Nix	May 17, 2023	1HJC13	2.03

== Production ==
=== Development ===
In September 2010, multiple websites reported that James Cameron, writer/director of the 1994 film, was developing and executive producing with Rae Sanchini, through Lightstorm Entertainment and 20th Television, a True Lies television series with Dark Angel producer René Echevarria serving as showrunner and producer. In 2017, Fox planned to do a pilot of the series, with Marc Guggenheim as screenwriter, McG as executive producer and possible director. In May 2019, McG announced on Collider Live that the television series would air on Disney+.

On February 10, 2021, CBS announced a pilot order for the second attempt at a True Lies series adaptation, with Matt Nix writing the pilot and producing with Josh Levy via Flying Glass of Milk Productions. Mary Viola of Wonderland Sound and Vision executive produced, with Corey Marsh of Wonderland co-executive producing. McG was set to direct the pilot and executive produce via Wonderland. In March 2021, CBS moved the pilot "off cycle" to give the series producers more time to film the pilot later in the year.

By May 2022, the series was revived, with Anthony Hemingway replacing McG as the director of the pilot and subsequent episodes, before CBS picked up the series to air in the 2022–2023 broadcast season. Steve Howey and Ginger Gonzaga were cast in the lead roles, while Erica Hernandez, Omar Miller, Mike O'Gorman, Annabella Didion, and Lucas Jaye round out the supporting roles.

By February 2023, Matthew Lillard, Keith David, Jackson Hurst, and Tom Connolly were confirmed to have guest roles, while Tom Arnold returned from the 1994 film.

On May 8, 2023, CBS canceled the series after one season.

== Release ==
Promotional poster for the first season.

True Lies premiered on March 1, 2023, and ended on May 17, 2023, on CBS. It was previously set to premiere on February 23, 2023. It aired in Canada on CTV the same day as its US release. Overseas, True Lies was released on Disney+.

== Reception ==
=== Critical response ===
The review aggregator website Rotten Tomatoes reported a 42% approval rating with an average rating of 4.3/10, based on 19 critic reviews. The website's critics consensus reads, "Bland as gruel, True Lies might borrow the name of a cinematic blockbuster but retains none of the personality that would differentiate it from the crowded field of espionage romances." Metacritic, which uses a weighted average, assigned a score of 49 out of 100 based on 14 critics, indicating "mixed or average reviews".

Tania Hussain of Collider gave the series a negative review, writing "CBS is no stranger to adapting previous material for success, but True Lies falls flat in carving out its own identity". Tim Surette of TV Guide also gave a negative review, summarizing that "CBS's commitment to making True Lies such an easy-breezy, network-friendly series means that it will have to face some hard truths: The idea that we want everything adapted into a TV show is a lie." Fred Topel of United Press International similarly gave a negative review, concluding that the series "skips over some of the best parts of the True Lies story. The creative decision to make Helen a spy right away deprives the viewer of the fun of Helen figuring it out and Harry desperately trying to cover up his missions." Neal Justin of Star Tribune gave the series a lukewarm review, speculating that "those who crave their action without the blood will be tempted to give it a try. And they'll be back."

=== Ratings ===
Viewership and ratings per episode of True Lies
No.	Title	Air date	Rating (18–49)	Viewers (millions)	DVR (18–49)	DVR viewers (millions)	Total (18–49)	Total viewers (millions)
1	"Pilot"	March 1, 2023	0.3	3.23	—N/a	—N/a	—N/a	—N/a
2	"Public Secrets"	March 8, 2023	0.3	2.60	—N/a	—N/a	—N/a	—N/a
3	"Separate Pairs"	March 15, 2023	0.3	2.58	—N/a	—N/a	—N/a	—N/a
4	"Rival Companions"	March 22, 2023	0.2	2.58	—N/a	—N/a	—N/a	—N/a
5	"Unrelated Parents"	March 29, 2023	0.2	2.60	—N/a	—N/a	—N/a	—N/a
6	"Working Vacation"	April 5, 2023	0.2	2.36	—N/a	—N/a	—N/a	—N/a
7	"Independent Dependents"	April 12, 2023	0.2	2.68	—N/a	—N/a	—N/a	—N/a
8	"Honest Manipulations"	April 19, 2023	0.3	2.62	—N/a	—N/a	—N/a	—N/a
9	"Bitter Sweethearts"	April 26, 2023	0.2	2.75	—N/a	—N/a	—N/a	—N/a
10	"Friendly Enemies"	May 3, 2023	0.2	2.14	—N/a	—N/a	—N/a	—N/a
11	"Unfamiliar Partnerships"	May 10, 2023	0.2	2.07	—N/a	—N/a	—N/a	—N/a
12	"Lying Truths"	May 17, 2023	0.2	2.03	—N/a	—N/a	—N/a	—N/a
13	"Waking Dreams"	May 17, 2023	0.2	2.03	—N/a	—N/a	—N/a	—N/a
