= Speed-the-Plow (film) =

- Directed by: David Mamet
- Screenplay by: David Mamet
- Based on: Speed-the-Plow by David Mamet
- Produced by: Vince Jolivette; Richie Hill; Tyler Payne; Douglas Riggs; Jiarui Guo; Anthony Short
- Starring: Anthony Mackie; Ben Mendelsohn; Emily Alyn Lind; Sharon Stone
- Production companies: Filmopoly; Steak & Rosé
- Country: United States
- Language: English

Speed-the-Plow is an upcoming American drama film written and directed by David Mamet, based on his 1988 stage play. It stars Anthony Mackie, Ben Mendelsohn, Emily Alyn Lind, and Sharon Stone.

== Premise ==
A film producer and his associate plan to pitch a project to a studio with a big time movie star attached until they're side-tracked by the producer's attractive secretary.

== Cast ==
- Anthony Mackie as Bob Grant
- Ben Mendelsohn as Charlie Fox
- Emily Alyn Lind as Karen
- Sharon Stone as Gemma Speed
- Rebecca Pidgeon as Georgia Cornchuk-Stein
- Chris Bauer as Mickey

== Production ==
On September 28, 2016, it was announced that David Mamet would direct the film adaptation of his own play Speed-the-Plow, replacing Michael Polish who was previously attached to direct. Mamet also wrote the screenplay, and the film would be produced by Emmett/Furla/Oasis Films' Randall Emmett and George Furla, and Irwin Winkler of Winkler Films.

Principal photography began on February 18, 2026, in Atlanta, with Anthony Mackie, Ben Mendelsohn, Emily Alyn Lind, Sharon Stone, Rebecca Pidgeon, and Chris Bauer joining the cast. Filming wrapped on March 13. In May 2026, it was reported that the film would be among the first to use an A.I. powered platform named "New Hollywood", developed by producer Alan Pao, which its system aims to make it easier for filmmakers to develop, produce, and post-produce movie projects, as well as connect with potential backers. However, several crew members who worked on the film have denied that the platform was used during production.
