= Lifeline (2025 film) =

2025 film directed by Feras Alfuqaha

- Directed by: Feras Alfuqaha
- Written by: Brian Price; Brady Morell
- Production company: Basma Pictures
- Distributed by: Dark Sky Films
- Release date: February 21, 2025
- Running time: 80 minutes
- Country: United States
- Language: English

Lifeline is a 2025 mystery thriller film directed by Feras Alfuqaha starring Josh Stewart, Judah Lewis, Craig Stark, Charlene Amoia, Luke Benward, August Maturo, Casey Simpson, and Brecken Merrill.

== Premise ==
During a late night shift, a suicide hotline operator receives a call where the caller claims to be him.

== Release ==
The film received a limited theatrical release by Dark Sky Films on February 21, 2025, followed by a digital release on the same day.

== Reception ==
On Dread Central, Tyler Doupe rated it 4/5 stars, writing that "Lifeline succeeds thanks to a strong script and a capable cast." On Film Threat, Bradley Gibson scored the film as 10 out of 10, writing in his review consensus section: "[Stewart] turns in a career-defining performance."

== See also ==
- List of American films of 2025
- List of thriller films of the 2020s
- List of mystery films
