= Holidate =

2020 romantic comedy film by John Whitesell

- Official release poster
- Directed by: John Whitesell
- Written by: Tiffany Paulsen
- Produced by: McG; Mary Viola
- Starring: Emma Roberts; Luke Bracey; Jake Manley; Jessica Capshaw; Andrew Bachelor; Frances Fisher; Manish Dayal; Kristin Chenoweth
- Cinematography: Shane Hurlbut
- Edited by: Emma E. Hickox
- Music by: Dan the Automator
- Production company: Wonderland Sound and Vision
- Distributed by: Netflix
- Release date: October 28, 2020
- Running time: 104 minutes
- Country: United States
- Language: English

Holidate is a 2020 American romantic comedy film directed by John Whitesell and written by Tiffany Paulsen. It stars Emma Roberts, Luke Bracey, Jake Manley, Jessica Capshaw, Andrew Bachelor, Frances Fisher, Manish Dayal and Kristin Chenoweth.

Sloane Benson, tired of familial pressure for being single on holidays, bumps into Australian stranger Jackson, who is also fed up with pressure on those dates, so they agree to platonically be each other's plus-ones all year long, inadvertently ending up mutually developing actual romantic feelings.

The film was released on Netflix on October 28, 2020 and the film's title is a reference to contemporary American cultural practice of coining sniglets.

== Plot ==
Workaholic Sloane Benson hates the holidays due to familial judgement she receives for being single. Having recently broken up with her boyfriend, her mother Elaine is constantly trying to set her up with a new man, much to Sloane's annoyance.

At Sloane's family's Christmas dinner, her younger brother York gets engaged to Liz, his girlfriend of three months, so Sloane is now the only single adult left in the family. Meanwhile, Jackson, an Australian golfer, is stuck spending the holidays with Carly, a woman he has no interest in, and her parents. His date becomes angry with him for not getting her a Christmas present although they had agreed not to exchange gifts, so he leaves in frustration.

After Christmas, Sloane and Jackson have a chance encounter at the mall when both are returning presents they received. Jackson suggests to avoid crazy and clingy dates, they should make a pact to be Holidates (dates only for Holidays). Though initially reluctant, she decides to take him up on his offer and they end up spending New Year's Eve together, but have no further contact.

However, on Valentine's Day, both have another chance encounter where Jackson pretends to be her boyfriend in front of her ex and his young and beautiful girlfriend. They slowly become friends after spending various holidays together.

After Sloane and Jackson become closer when he loses a finger on July 4th, he fears he is not good enough for her, so he tries to set her up with a better date. This leads to a fight at her brother's wedding on Labor Day, where her date, Faarooq, and his date, Sloane’s aunt Susan, hook up.

While at a Halloween party together, Sloane becomes unwell after unknowingly taking laxatives. Jackson takes care of her until they end up falling asleep together. They then have sex the morning after, until Sloane's married sister, Abby, arrives panicking about kissing Jackson’s friend, Neil, the night before at the party. Sloane uses it as an excuse to shove Jackson out, much to his dismay.

At Thanksgiving, they fight after Jackson opens up to Sloane and tells her how he feels about them. In the store when Sloane says "Ryan Gosling would never do his own shopping" there is a blurred customer in the background who looks like the actor. Both break off contact afterwards. Abby’s husband, Peter, finds out about her kissing Neil at Halloween. Susan’s holidate, Wally, has a heart attack, and the doctor treating him is Faarooq, who Susan had a brief but intense romance with over Halloween, before breaking it off. Susan confesses to Faarooq that she made a mistake in ending things and asks him for another chance. They kiss and reconcile.

In the days leading to Christmas, Sloane visits Jackson's place but loses her nerve, still unable to speak to him. When shopping at the mall, they have another chance encounter. In front of hundreds of people, she finally confesses her love for Jackson and the two embrace.

The end credits reveal that all of the couples are still together. Sloane and Jackson travel to Australia for the holidays, Abby and Peter get remarried, Susan and Faarooq get engaged, Elaine and Wally are together, and Neil and Carly (Jackson's date from the beginning of the film) spend Christmas with her family.

== Cast ==
- Emma Roberts as Sloane Benson
- Luke Bracey as Jackson Piretti
- Andrew Bachelor as Neil
- Jessica Capshaw as Abby
- Manish Dayal as Faarooq
- Alex Moffat as Peter
- Jake Manley as York
- Cynthy Wu as Liz
- Frances Fisher as Elaine
- Kristin Chenoweth as Aunt Susan
- Dan Lauria as Wally
- Carl McDowell as Scruffy Santa
- Nicola Peltz as Felicity
- Julien Marlon as Luc
- Mikaela Hoover as Annie
- Aimee Carrero as Carly
- Meeghan Holaway as Carly's Mom
- Savannah Reina as Daisy
- Billy Slaughter as Barry
- Carlos Lacamara as Carly's Dad

== Production ==
In March 2019, it was announced Emma Roberts had joined the cast of the film, with John Whitesell directing from a screenplay by Tiffany Paulsen. McG and Mary Viola would serve as producers on the film under their Wonderland Sound and Vision banner, while Netflix would distribute. In May 2019, Luke Bracey, Jake Manley, Jessica Capshaw, Andrew Bachelor, Frances Fisher, Manish Dayal and Kristin Chenoweth joined the cast of the film. In June 2019, Alex Moffat joined the cast of the film.

=== Filming ===
Principal photography began in May 2019 in Atlanta, Georgia.

=== Music ===
The film's original score was composed by Dan the Automator.

== Release ==
Holidate was digitally released by Netflix on October 28, 2020. It was the top-streamed item in its debut weekend. On November 4, Variety reported the film was the 25th-most watched straight-to-streaming title of 2020 up to that point. In January 2021, Netflix reported 68 million households had watched the film.

== Reception ==
On review aggregator Rotten Tomatoes, the film holds an approval rating of 45% based on 60 reviews, with an average rating of 5.2/10. The website's critics consensus reads, "Holidate's self-aware approach to rom-com formula is refreshing, but it's offset by a questionable premise and unnecessarily vulgar jokes." On Metacritic, it has a weighted average score of 44 out of 100, based on 15 critics, indicating "mixed or average" reviews.

== See also ==
- List of Christmas films
