= Rim of the World =

2019 American science fiction film

- Promotional release poster
- Directed by: McG
- Written by: Zack Stentz
- Produced by: McG; Mary Viola; Susan Solomon-Shapiro; Matt Smith
- Starring: Jack Gore; Miya Cech; Benjamin Flores Jr.; Alessio Scalzotto; Andrew Bachelor; Annabeth Gish
- Cinematography: Shane Hurlbut
- Edited by: Vincent Tabaillon
- Music by: Bear McCreary
- Production companies: Wonderland Sound and Vision; Circle Of Confusion
- Distributed by: Netflix
- Release date: May 24, 2019
- Running time: 98 minutes
- Country: United States
- Language: English
- Budget: $19 million

Rim of the World is a 2019 American apocalyptic science fiction adventure film directed by McG and written by Zack Stentz. It stars Jack Gore, Miya Cech, Benjamin Flores Jr. and Alessio Scalzotto.

The film, which was Stentz's modern take on the kid-centered action films of the 1980s, was streamed on Netflix on May 24, 2019. It was the most watched content in the SVOD service in the UK the week it was released, overtaking the series Dead to Me and Riverdale.

== Plot ==
Alex, a socially reclusive boy whose father recently died in a fire, reluctantly attends the southern Californian summer camp "Rim of the World". He meets two other "misfits" - Zhen Zhen, a non-verbal orphan girl from China, and the wealthy, outspoken Dariush.

One afternoon, while waiting to canoe, Zhen Zhen wanders off seeking the view from the camp poster, so Alex follows. He bumps into Dariush, who tries to 'cure' Alex's fear of heights by forcing him near a cliff edge. Gabriel, a boy not from camp, intervenes. Zhen Zhen, comes upon hearing the commotion. Suddenly, they simultaneously receive warning texts to immediately evacuate the area.

Hurrying back, they discover the camp bus has left without them, and they witness alien ships invading the valley. Returning to camp, they find everyone gone - except for camp counselor Conrad. Suddenly, a Dragon spacecraft fleeing the International Space Station lands nearby.

The dying astronaut inside gives Alex a key, with instructions to take it to NASA's Jet Propulsion Lab (JPL) facility in Pasadena, as it is the only way to destroy the aliens. One appears with its "dog", killing the astronaut. The kids hide, Conrad gets killed, then they manage to elude the aliens and escape the camp.

Making their way to the deserted sheriff's office, they find inmate Lou, who was left behind in a cell. He claims to have a son waiting for him, so the empathetic Alex releases him before the group continues on to JPL. Later, they encounter Marines who are evacuating civilians.

The commander gratefully takes the key and puts the children on a bus to safety. However, alien ships attack the convoy, the soldiers are killed, so Alex retrieves the key from the dying commander and the group again heads for JPL. During the night, after briefly resting in Gabriel's old house, Gabriel confesses he escaped from a juvenile hall, where he was unjustly placed due to a customer at his mother's store wrongly accusing him of intentionally retaining his change at the deposit box, unaware of his dyscalculia.

Sometime after, a gang of masked individuals attacks them led by Lou, who reveals himself as a murderous thief who had tricked them into releasing him. He offers to free them in exchange for the key, which he wants to sell on the black market. Alex refuses, so Lou is about to stab him when the alien from the camp attacks. Lou and his men are killed, but the kids manage to escape after trapping it.

While walking in the forest, Dariush and Gabriel fight and Dariush reveals that his father lost their car dealership, so is going to jail, which is why he was sent to camp. Suddenly, they receive an SOS from the doctor at JPL they are to give the key to, encouraging them to hurry along.

The kids walk into a mall to change clothes. Afterwards, they take a Ford Mustang from the parking lot, which Zhen Zhen can drive, to speed to JPL, but they are again attacked by the alien. They abandon the vehicle while trying to escape it, but realize they left the key behind. Dariush retrieves the key alone, getting injured by the alien in the process.

They finally arrive to the JPL facility, but find the doctor dead. The SOS message was caused by his blood dripping onto his transmitter. Making radio contact with a general at NORAD, he explains that the key can be used to destroy the alien mothership in orbit via the Cold War defense project Excalibur.

Zhen Zhen goes to the basement to start the emergency generators, and is attacked by an alien dog. Alex goes to the roof to realign the communication dish, where the alien attacks him. Zhen Zhen locks the dog in the basement, returning to the command room to help Gabriel and the injured Dariush insert the keys to launch the Excalibur weapon.

Zhen Zhen, Dariush, and Gabriel evacuate the JPL building, while Alex lures the alien into an engine test room, killing it with the engine's exhaust. The teens watch as the alien mothership explodes. Alex is reunited with his mother and the children are celebrated as heroes.

== Cast ==
- Jack Gore as Alex
- Miya Cech as ZhenZhen
- Benjamin Flores Jr. as Dariush
- Alessio Scalzotto as Gabriel
- Andrew Bachelor as Logan
- Annabeth Gish as Grace
- Scott MacArthur as Lou

== Production ==
In March 2018, it was reported that McG would direct Rim of the World for Netflix from a screenplay by Zack Stentz. In an interview, Stentz revealed that he started working on the script as early as 2017 and the deal with Netflix was closed a year later. Principal production commenced in May 2018 in Los Angeles, California. In June 2018, the cast was announced.

Principal photography began in June 2018 and reportedly lasted 40 days.

== Reception ==
The film received generally negative reviews from critics. On the review aggregator website, Rotten Tomatoes, 31% of 13 critics' reviews are positive, with an average rating of 4.20/10. The website's critical consensus reads, "Rim of the World is too bland to live up to the 80s teen adventures it references, and too full of clichés to be able to set itself apart from them."
