= Wonderland Sound and Vision =

American media production company

- Type: Motion Picture; Television
- Founded: 2000
- Founder: Joseph McGinty Nichol
- Headquarters: United States
- Key people: McG (Founder); Mary Viola (President); Steven Bello (Vice President)
- Website: wonderlandsoundandvision.com

Wonderland Sound and Vision, Inc., or simply known as Wonderland, Inc., is an American production company founded by director and producer Joseph McGinty Nichol in 2001. It independently develops, produces and finances its own slate of feature films, television and digital projects. The company is responsible for television series The O.C., Chuck, and Supernatural, alongside films Terminator Salvation, We Are Marshall, The DUFF and The Babysitter.

== History ==
The company was originally formed after the success of Charlie's Angels, setting up Wonderland with a two-year motion picture deal at Columbia Pictures to set up projects on November 3, 2000. Wonderland set up its own television shop on October 8, 2001, with its first gig, Fastlane, with John McNamara, whose by that time, received an exclusive production pact with Warner Bros. Television themselves.

On July 16, 2002, the company received a two-year production contract at Warner Bros. Television to produce their television projects. On September 9, 2004, Peter Johnson joined Wonderland Sound and Vision as television president of the studio.

On August 2, 2007, the company signed a first look deal with Warner Bros., whose television contract was already renewed, to develop film projects for the studio.

== Filmography ==
=== Television ===
Year	Title
2002–2003	Fastlane
2003–2007	The O.C.
2004–2005	The Mountain
2005–2013	Supernatural
2007–2012	Chuck
2010–2011	Human Target
2010–2013	Nikita
2015	Kevin from Work
2021	Turner & Hooch
2022–2023	The Winchesters
2023–2024	Not Dead Yet
2023	True Lies
2023	Average Joe

=== Film ===
Year	Title
2003	Charlie's Angels: Full Throttle
2006	Stay Alive
2006	We Are Marshall
2009	Terminator Salvation
2014	3 Days to Kill
2014	Before We Go
2014	Mercy
2015	The DUFF
2015	Playing It Cool
2017	The Babysitter
2018	When We First Met
2018	I Feel Pretty
2019	Rim of the World
2019	Tall Girl
2020	The Babysitter: Killer Queen
2020	Holidate
2021	Love Hard
2022	Tall Girl 2
2023	Family Switch
2024	Música
2024	Uglies
2026	Way of the Warrior Kid
TBA	Clashing Through the Snow

=== Internet television ===
Year	Title
2008	Sorority Forever
2009	Terminator Salvation: The Machinima Series
2011–2013	Aim High
