= King Bach =

Canadian-American internet personality and actor (born 1988)

- Born: Andrew Byron Bachelor; June 26, 1988 (age 38); Toronto, Ontario, Canada
- Education: Florida State University (BS)
- Occupations: Internet comedian; actor
- Years active: 2006–present
- Website: andrewbachelor.com

Andrew Byron Bachelor (born June 26, 1988), better known by his stage name King Bach (/bætʃ/ BATCH), is a Canadian-American Internet comedian and actor who rose to fame on the now-defunct video sharing service Vine, on which he was the most-followed user with 16.2 million followers.

Bachelor ventured into acting, first receiving recognition for starring on the Adult Swim series Black Jesus (2014–2015). He rose to mainstream prominence for his roles in the comedy films Meet the Blacks and Fifty Shades of Black (both 2016), the teen romance films When We First Met and To All the Boys I've Loved Before (both 2018), the horror comedy films The Babysitter (2017) and The Babysitter: Killer Queen (2020), and the disaster film Greenland (2020).

Bachelor also has a TikTok account with 28.3 million followers and runs a YouTube channel with over 3.5 million subscribers.

== Early life and education ==
Bachelor was born in the neighbourhood of Rexdale in Toronto, Ontario to Jamaican parents, accountants Ingrid Mourice and Byron Bachelor. He has one younger sister named Christina. He was two years old when he moved with his family to United States and grew up in West Palm Beach, Florida. His strict parents raised him in a Christian household.

He attended Coral Springs Charter School for both middle school and high school. After graduating, Bachelor enrolled at Florida State University, where he competed in the high jump. While a student, he was a member of 30in60, a sketch comedy troupe. He graduated from Florida State University in 2010, with a degree in business management. While at Florida State, Bachelor pledged and became a member/brother of Phi Beta Sigma. Afterwards, he enrolled in a graduate program at the New York Film Academy, but dropped out in his last semester and moved to Los Angeles. He then studied improvisational theatre at The Groundlings.

== Career ==
Bachelor earned 16.2 million followers and over 6.1 billion loops on Vine, ranking first on the app for number of followers. He took the title of most-followed person on Vine in March 2015. Though best known for Vine, Bachelor is also known for his YouTube channel, BachelorsPadTv. Bachelor has stated that he turned down most requests to upload sponsored Vines.

Bachelor's Vine stardom led to him signing with UTA, and landing a recurring role in House of Lies. In addition, he was a recurring cast member on Wild 'n Out on MTV2. He was also on a series regular on the Adult Swim series Black Jesus, and had a recurring role on The Mindy Project. Bachelor also had a role in the spoof comedy film Fifty Shades of Black, and was a special guest host for the revived version of Punk'd on BET. He appeared as a fictional version of himself in the 2015 film We Are Your Friends.

Bachelor was introduced to Vine by Brittany Furlan, before uploading his first Vine video on April 19, 2013. He starred in several of Bart Baker's parodies of music videos, portraying Big Sean in "Problem" and "Break Free", Pharrell Williams in "Happy", Juicy J in "Dark Horse", and Tupac Shakur in the parody for Sia's "Big Girls Cry".

Bach co-starred in McG's horror film The Babysitter. He reprised his role in the sequel The Babysitter: Killer Queen.

Bach released his debut album, "Medicine", on August 31, 2019. He released two singles from the album. "Say Daddy" was released on February 14, 2019, and "HTH" was released on May 31, 2019.

Bach also has made several songs, including "See Me Now" which he released on February 21, 2021. Bach sent a TikTok telling people to use the sound of a song and that he would duet the best ones. Bach later posted the song onto YouTube, Spotify and SoundCloud. In 2023, Bach was featured in the music video for "TRUCK BED" by country artist HARDY.

== Filmography ==
=== Film ===
Year	Title	Role	Notes
2015	We Are Your Friends	Himself	Cameo
2016	Fifty Shades of Black	Jesse	
2016	Meet the Blacks	Freezee	
2017	Grow House	Andy	
2017	Shot Caller	Tony	Cameo
2017	The Babysitter	John	
2017	Where's the Money	Del Goodlow	Executive Producer
2017	Angry Angel	Leonard	
2018	When We First Met	Max	
2018	Game Over, Man!	Hotel Guest	Uncredited Cameo
2018	To All the Boys I've Loved Before	Greg	
2019	Rim of the World	Logan	
2019	Airplane Mode	Himself	
2020	Coffee & Kareem	Rodney	
2020	The F**k-It List	Jasper Zim	
2020	Greenland	Colin	
2020	The Babysitter: Killer Queen	John	
2020	Holidate	Neil	
2020	Love, Weddings & Other Disasters	Captain Ritchie	
2021	The House Next Door: Meet the Blacks 2	Freezee	
2021	Vacation Friends	Gabe	
2021	National Champions	Taylor Sheridan	
2023	Fear	Benny	
2023	Family Switch	Glen	
2023	Float	Jesse	
2023	In Deep	—N/a	Director; won Best Action Film
2026	Violent Night 2	TBA	Post-production
TBA	Legend of the White Dragon	U.R.I.	Post-production
TBA	Road House 2	TBA	Post-production
TBA	Goodbye Girl	TBA	Filming
TBA	Tap Twice	TBA	Also director; post-production

=== Television ===
Year	Title	Role	Notes
2012	House of Lies	Chris	4 episodes
2014–2015	Wild 'n Out	Himself	18 episodes
2014–2015	The Mindy Project	Dr. T.J. Gigak	5 episodes
2014–2015	Black Jesus	Trayvon	21 episodes
2015	Key & Peele	Buddy #1	Episode: "MC Mom"
2015	The Soul Man	Travis Fontana	Episode: "Oh Snow You Didn't"
2015	Punk'd	Himself	Co-host
2015	Resident Advisors	Sam Parker	7 episodes
2016	TripTank	Various voices	Episode: "The D.O.N.G."
2016	Easy	Andrew	Episode: "Art and Life"
2017	Workaholics	Colt	Episode: "Trainees' Day"
2017	Angie Tribeca	Aaron McLaren	Episode: "Brockman Turner Overdrive"
2017	Dead House	Frank Shabazz	Episode: "Human Lives Matter"; Writer, director, executive producer: 6 episodes
2020	The Walking Dead	Bailey	Episode: "What We Become"
2020	The Real Bros of Simi Valley	Himself	Episode: "Back in High School"
2020	Home Movie: The Princess Bride	Vizzini	Episode: "Chapter Four: Battle of the Wits"
2020	Sneakerheads	Bobby	6 episodes
2021	Creepshow	Jackson	Episode: "Familiar"
2022	Black-ish	Isaiah	Episode: "Hoop Dreams"
2023	Dhar Mann	Peter	Episode: "Spider-Man Fights Bullies Inside School ft. King Bach"
2024	The Walking Dead: The Ones Who Live	Bailey	Episode: "Gone"

=== Video games ===
Year	Title	Role	Notes
2018	Madden NFL 19	Tito Flavors	Longshot: Homecoming Mode
