= Leslie Bibb =

American actress and model (born 1973)

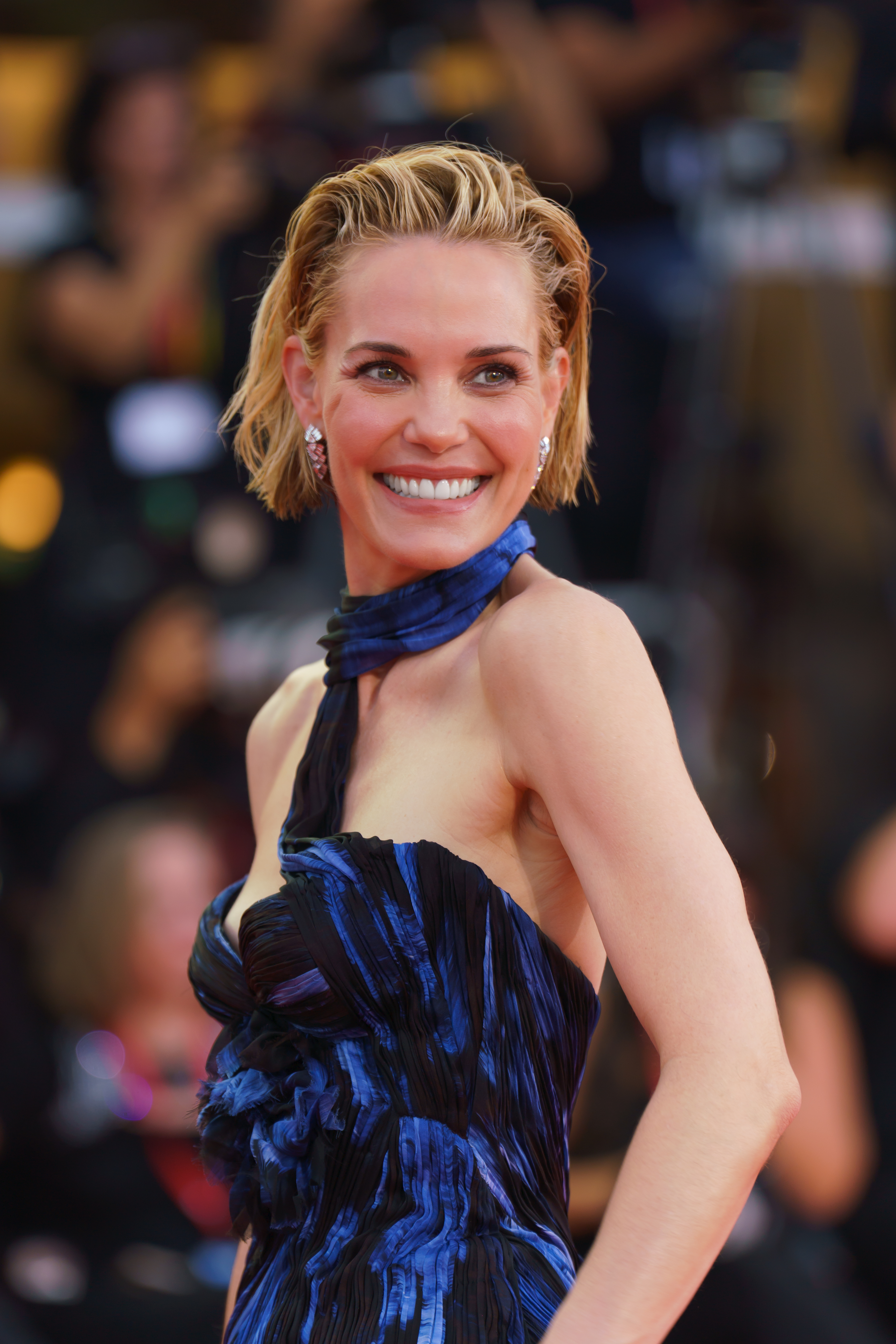
- Bibb in 2026
- Born: November 17, 1973 (age 52); Bismarck, North Dakota, U.S.
- Education: William Esper Studio
- Occupations: Actress, model
- Years active: 1996–present
- Spouse: Rob Born (m. 2003; div. 2004)
- Partner: Sam Rockwell (2007–present)

Leslie Bibb (born November 17, 1973) is an American actress and former model.

Bibb first gained recognition for playing Brooke McQueen on the WB teen series Popular (1999–2001). She portrayed journalist Christine Everhart in Marvel Cinematic Universe projects, including Iron Man (2008) and Iron Man 2 (2010). Her other television work includes Grace Sampson on Netflix's Jupiter's Legacy (2021), Dinah Donahue on Apple TV's Palm Royale (2024), and Kate in season three of HBO’s The White Lotus (2025). For her guest role in the comedy series Hacks (2026), she received her first nomination for a Primetime Emmy Award for Outstanding Guest Actress in a Comedy Series.

== Early life ==
Bibb was born in Bismarck, North Dakota, and raised in Lovingston, Virginia. Her father died when she was 3 years old. Bibb subsequently moved to Richmond, Virginia with her mother and three older sisters, where she attended the all-girls Catholic private school Saint Gertrude High School.

She attended the University of Virginia for one semester, before leaving for New York once she discovered she wanted to pursue acting. She then attended a 2-year acting program at William Esper Studio.

== Career ==
=== Modeling ===
In 1990, when Bibb was 16, The Oprah Winfrey Show and the Elite Agency held a nationwide modeling search. The celebrity judges – John Casablancas, Naomi Campbell, Linda Evangelista, and Iman – chose Bibb as the winner.

=== Acting ===
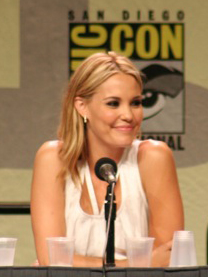
Bibb at San Diego Comic-Con promoting The Midnight Meat Train in 2007

Bibb first appeared on television in 1996, playing in episodes of Pacific Blue and Home Improvement. Her first film role came in the Howard Stern comedy Private Parts. This was followed by her first television series, where she replaced the departed Susan Walters as the female lead in the second season of The Big Easy. It was canceled months later after low ratings. She appeared in the romantic drama Touch Me (1997) and had a supporting role in the film This Space Between Us (1999). In 1999, Bibb had her big break appearing as a lead character on the WB Network television series Popular. Her role was Brooke McQueen, the most popular girl at Kennedy High School who is beautiful, a straight-A student, and a cheerleader. The show garnered her a Teen Choice Award for Television Choice Actress and a Young Hollywood Award nomination for Exciting New Face – Female. During the series, she filmed the psychological thriller The Skulls (1999), as the classmate, friend and love interest of one of the main characters. The Skulls received a negative reception from critics but was a box-office success. She received a role in the 2001 comedy See Spot Run, playing a single mother who spends most of the film on her own Planes, Trains and Automobiles–style adventure.

Bibb was cast in a recurring role on the series ER and played the lead character on the television series Line of Fire. Bibb joined the cast of Crossing Jordan as Detective Lu Simmons until Season 6. She appeared as Desiree in the independent film Wristcutters: A Love Story (2006). Wristcutters revolved around two characters who fall in love in purgatory after committing suicide. The film was nominated for the Sundance Film Festival's Grand Jury Prize, two Independent Spirit Awards and the Humanitas Prize. That year, she played Will Ferrell's character's wife Carley in the comedy feature film Talladega Nights: The Ballad of Ricky Bobby. Recalling acting with Ferrell during an interview with TV Guide, she said he was "just funny. And he has no qualms about making something funnier for you, even at his expense."

Bibb also starred in the unaired sitcom Atlanta as Jessica. She was cast as Dr. Miranda Storm in Sex and Death 101, a black comedy, which was released direct-to-video in 2007. She appeared as a Vanity Fair reporter named Christine Everhart in the action film Iron Man (2008). In an interview, Bibb said about her character in the film: "she has a very strong sense of right and wrong, of good and evil, and I loved her passion." In 2008, Bibb starred as Maya Jones in the Ryuhei Kitamura–directed horror film The Midnight Meat Train (2008), based on Clive Barker's 1984 short story of the same name.

In the comedy Confessions of a Shopaholic (2009), she portrayed the rival of the main character. Confessions of a Shopaholic was panned by film critics but was a success at the box office. She had a pivotal recurring role on the NBC series Kings as Katrina Ghent and played Sarah Lowell in the thriller film Law Abiding Citizen (2009), which was released on October 16, 2009. The film was poorly received by critics.

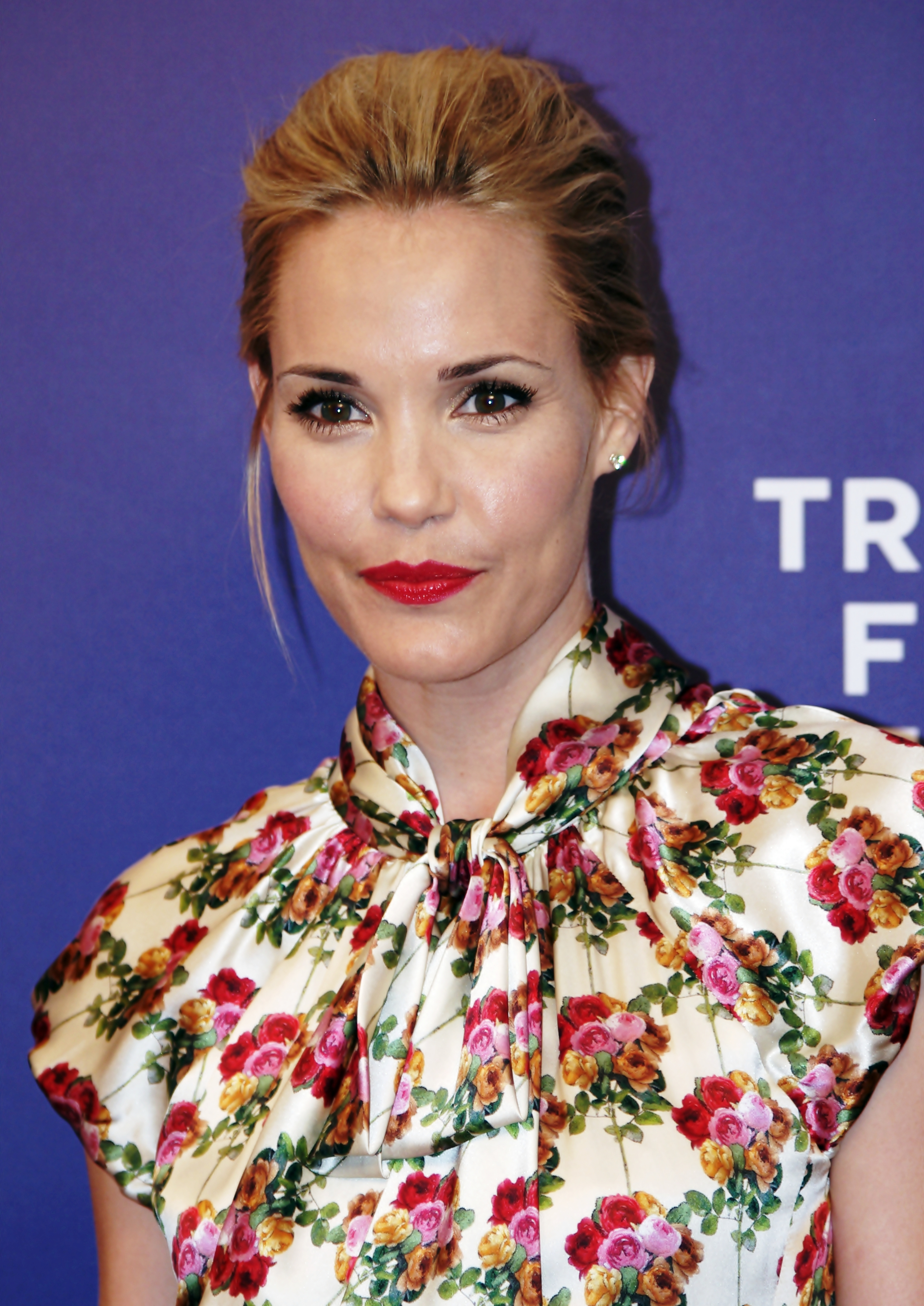
Bibb in 2011

In 2010, she reprised her role as Everhart in the sequel to Iron Man, Iron Man 2. The film is Bibb's biggest box-office success, with a worldwide gross of $621.8 million. Later in 2010, she starred in the independent comedy Miss Nobody, for which she also served as co-producer. For her performance, she won the Best Actress Award at the 26th Boston Film Festival. She was praised by critic Alissa Simon of Variety, who wrote "as she proved in Goran Dukic's Wristcutters: A Love Story, statuesque star Bibb is a smart actress willing to give herself totally to a role. As the sweetly goofy murderess, she takes pratfalls, suffers endless groping and sports unbecoming attire." Bibb also appeared in Kevin James' The Zookeeper, released in 2011. In 2012, Bibb starred as Amanda Vaughn on the ABC series GCB, which debuted on March 4, 2012, but the show was cancelled after 10 episodes.

In 2016, Bibb starred in the first season of YouTube Red original show Rhett & Link's Buddy System. She also appeared in an episode of the show's second season, which was released in 2017. She began recurring on ABC's American Housewife in 2016, playing the divorced next-door neighbor Viv. In 2017, Bibb starred in the Netflix comedy-horror film The Babysitter. She reprised her role in its 2020 sequel The Babysitter: Killer Queen. Also in 2017, she was cast as Susan Rollins in the comedy film Tag. In February 2019, it was announced that Bibb had been cast as Grace Sampson in the Netflix superhero series Jupiter's Legacy. In December 2020, she was cast in horror thriller The Inhabitant.

Bibb joined Netflix's workplace comedy series God's Favorite Idiot as Satan in March 2021. In September 2021, she was tapped to play Ellie in comedy film About My Father.

In 2024, she starred as Dinah Donahue in the Apple TV+ series Palm Royale. In 2025, she starred as Kate in the third season of HBO's The White Lotus.

In 2026, she guest starred in an episode of the HBO series Hacks, for which she received a nomination for a Primetime Emmy Award for Outstanding Guest Actress in a Comedy Series.

In 2026, it was announced that she will serve as an executive producer and star in the dark comedy series The Rush Whisperer, in development at HBO.

== Philanthropy and advocacy ==
Bibb has supported Friends of El Faro, a grassroots group that raises funds for Casa Hogar Sion orphanage in Tijuana, appearing at multiple benefit events in the mid-2000s.

In 2008, Revlon announced that its Almay brand had signed Bibb as its ambassador. She has acted as a spokeswoman for Revlon's new and existing cosmetics collections and has appeared in global multi-media campaigns.

In 2010 she served as national spokesperson for Life Insurance Awareness Month, partnering with the nonprofit LIFE Foundation.

She posed nude for the May 2012 issue of Allure magazine – alongside Maria Menounos, Debra Messing, Taraji P. Henson, and Morena Baccarin.

== Personal life ==
Bibb married investment banker Rob Born in 2003, and they divorced in 2004.

She has been in a relationship with actor Sam Rockwell since 2007, having met in Los Angeles while he was filming Frost/Nixon. They have both appeared in Iron Man 2, Don Verdean, and The White Lotus. They have stated that they do not intend to get married. Bibb has also said that she does not want to have children. Bibb and Rockwell live in New York.

== Filmography ==
Key
†	Denotes works that have not yet been released

=== Film ===
Year	Title	Role	Notes
1997	Private Parts	WNBC Tour Guide	
1997	Touch Me	Fawn	
1999	This Space Between Us	Summer	
2000	The Young Unknowns	Cassandra	
2000	The Skulls	Chloe Whitfield	
2001	See Spot Run	Stephanie	
2006	Wristcutters: A Love Story	Desiree Randolph	
2006	Talladega Nights: The Ballad of Ricky Bobby	Carley Bobby	
2007	My Wife Is Retarded	Julie	Short film
2007	Sex and Death 101	Dr. Miranda Storm	Direct-to-video
2008	Iron Man	Christine Everhart	
2008	The Midnight Meat Train	Maya Jones	
2008	Trick 'r Treat	Emma	Direct-to-video
2009	Confessions of a Shopaholic	Alicia Billington	
2009	Law Abiding Citizen	Sarah Lowell	
2010	Iron Man 2	Christine Everhart	
2010	Miss Nobody	Sarah Jane McKinney	Also executive producer
2011	Zookeeper	Stephanie	
2011	A Good Old Fashioned Orgy	Kelly	
2012	Meeting Evil	Joanie	
2013	Movie 43	Wonder Woman	Segment "Superhero Speed Dating"
2013	Hell Baby	Vanessa	
2014	No Good Deed	Meg	
2014	Flight 7500	Laura Baxter	
2014	Take Care	Frannie	Also producer
2015	Don Verdean	Joylinda Lazarus	
2017	To the Bone	Megan	
2017	Awakening the Zodiac	Zoe Branson	
2017	The Babysitter	Mom	
2018	Tag	Susan Rollins	
2019	Running with the Devil	Agent in charge	
2020	The Lost Husband	Libby Moran	Also producer
2020	The Babysitter: Killer Queen	Mom	
2022	The Inhabitant	Emily Haldon	
2023	About My Father	Ellie	
2024	Juror #2	Denice Aldworth	

=== Television ===
Year	Title	Role	Notes
1996	Pacific Blue	Nikki	Episode: "Wheels of Fire"
1996	Home Improvement	Lisa Burton	Episode: "No Place Like Home"
1997	Just Shoot Me!	Nikki	Episode: "Secretary's Day"
1997	Fired Up	Lana	Episode: "The Rules"
1997	The Big Easy	Janine Rebbenack	Main role (season 2)
1998	Astoria		TV pilot
1998	Something So Right	Tina	Episode: "Something About a Double Standard"
1998	Early Edition	Emily Harrigan	Episode: "Lt. Hobson, U.S.N."
1999	Sons of Thunder	Nancy Jones	Episode: "Daddy's Girl"
2000	Grosse Pointe	Herself	Episode: "Mommy Dearest"
1999–2001	Popular	Brooke McQueen	Main role
2002–2003	ER	Erin Harkins	Recurring role (season 9)
2003–2004	Line of Fire	Paige Van Doren	Main role
2004	Capital City	Paige Armstrong	TV pilot
2004	Nip/Tuck	Naomi Gaines	Episode: "Naomi Gaines"
2005	Hitched	Emily	TV pilot
2005–2007	Crossing Jordan	Det. Tallulah "Lu" Simmons	Main role (seasons 5–6)
2007	CSI: Miami	Beth Selby/Cayla Selby/Ashley Whitford	Episode: "Triple Threat"
2007	Entourage	Laurie	Episode: "Gotcha"
2007	Atlanta	Jessica	TV pilot
2009	Kings	Katrina Ghent	Recurring role
2009–2010, 2015	The League	Meegan Eckhart	Recurring role
2012	GCB	Amanda Vaughn	Main role
2014	The Following	Jana Murphy	2 episodes
2014–2015	About a Boy	Dakota	Recurring role
2015	The Odd Couple	Casey	Recurring role
2015	Salem Rogers: Model of the Year 1998	Salem Rogers	Main role
2016–2017	Rhett & Link's Buddy System	Aimee Brells	Recurring (season 1); guest (season 2)
2016–2020	American Housewife	Viv	Recurring role
2017–2018	Nobodies	Sam	12 episodes
2020	Home Movie: The Princess Bride	Princess Buttercup	Episode: "Chapter Five: Life Is Pain"
2021	Jupiter's Legacy	Grace Sampson	Main role
2021	What If...?	Christine Everhart (voice)	2 episodes: "What If... Doctor Strange Lost His Heart Instead of His Hands?" & What If... Killmonger Rescued Tony Stark?"
2021	Love Life	Becca Evans	Recurring role (season 2)
2022	Robot Chicken	Giuliana Rancic / Millie Tabootie (voice)	Episode: "May Cause Indecision... Or Not"
2022	God's Favorite Idiot	Satan	Main role
2024–2026	Palm Royale	Dinah Donahue	Main role
2025	The White Lotus	Kate Bohr	Main role (season 3)
2026	Hacks	Monica	Episode: "Montecito"

=== Web ===
List of performances by Leslie Bibb on the web
Year	Title	Role	Notes
2013	Burning Love	Bevarly	Southern party girl
2015–2016	WHIH Newsfront	Christine Everhart	Main role

== Awards and nominations ==
Year	Award	Category	Work	Result	Ref.
2000	Teen Choice Awards	Television Choice Actress	Popular	Nominated	
2001	Young Hollywood Awards	Exciting New Face – Female	Popular	Nominated	
2010	Boston Film Festival	Best Actress Award	Miss Nobody	Won	
2026	Actor Awards	Outstanding Performance by an Ensemble in a Drama Series	The White Lotus	Nominated	
2026	Primetime Emmy Awards	Outstanding Guest Actress in a Comedy Series	Hacks	Nominated	
