= McG =

American film director and producer (born 1968)

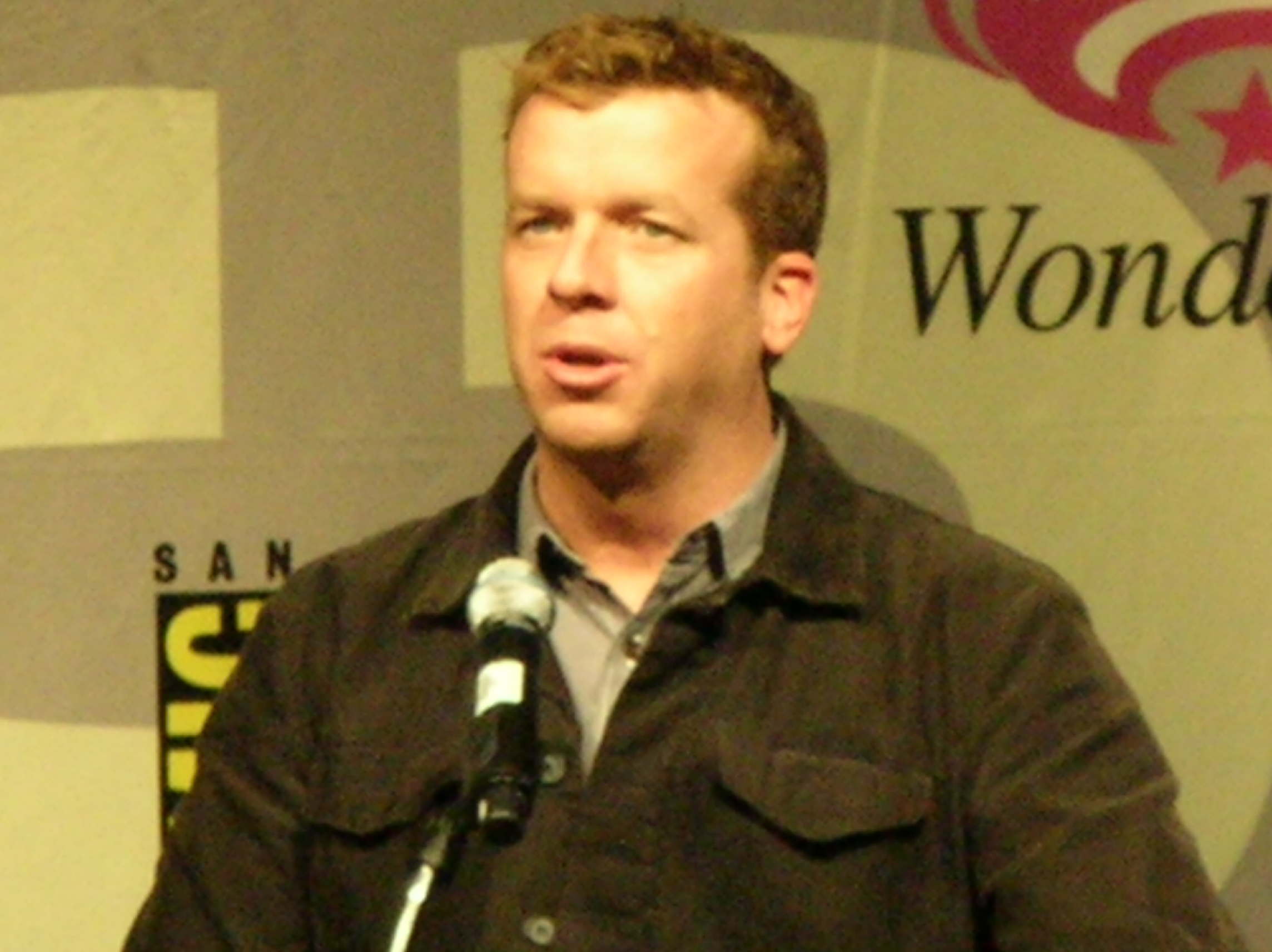
- McG at WonderCon in 2009
- Born: Joseph McGinty Nichol; August 9, 1968 (age 58); Kalamazoo, Michigan, U.S.
- Education: UC Irvine (BA)
- Occupations: Director; producer
- Years active: 1993–present
- Notable work: Charlie's Angels; We Are Marshall; Terminator Salvation; This Means War; The Babysitter
- Television: Fastlane; The O.C. Supernatural; Chuck

Joseph McGinty Nichol (born August 9, 1968), known professionally as McG, is an American film director, film producer, and former record producer.

McG began his career in the music industry, directing music videos and producing various albums. He later rose to prominence with his debut theatrically released narrative feature, Charlie's Angels, which had the highest-grossing opening weekend for a directorial debut at the time. Since then, he has directed several other films, including Terminator Salvation, This Means War, and The Babysitter. On television, McG co-created Fastlane with John McNamara and executive produced The O.C., Supernatural, and Chuck.

McG also owns a production company, Wonderland Sound and Vision, founded in 2001, which has overseen the production of the films and television shows he has worked on since Charlie's Angels: Full Throttle.

== Early life ==
Joseph McGinty Nichol was born in Kalamazoo, Michigan, and grew up in Newport Beach, California. As his uncle and grandfather were also named Joe, his mother nicknamed him "McG" to avoid confusion.

McG attended Corona del Mar High School, where he met Mark McGrath. Initially he wanted to become the lead singer of a band he formed with McGrath. However, he failed as a front man and persuaded McGrath to take over. Instead he worked behind the scenes as producer and marketer for the band until he was 22. He then obtained a Bachelor of Arts in psychology from UC Irvine. McG thought of attending medical school afterwards, but tired of studying, he formed a record label known as G Recordings in 1993, working on his hobby as a still photographer, shooting local bands and musicians, along with earning money driving a delivery truck. He eventually brought to the latter job McGrath, who had been in a state of depressive apathy after graduating, and decided to again try his hand fronting a band. The band had several hit singles as Sugar Ray, signed with a label, and went on tour. McGrath has said McG has been a "psychologist, therapist and [musical] collaborator" to him, including convincing him to record "Fly", which would become Sugar Ray's breakout hit, given McGrath previously did not feel he had the singing voice to perform the song well.

== Career ==
=== Early work ===
In 1995, McG produced Sugar Ray's first album and co-wrote several songs on their second. He borrowed $3,500 from his father to make a music video for the song "Caboose", which helped the band get signed with Atlantic Records and started his career as a music video director. His work doing the first three Korn music videos led to a stint with Cypress Hill, and afterwards McG became highly sought with over fifty music video credits such as Sublime's "Santeria", Smash Mouth's "All Star", and The Offspring's "Pretty Fly (For a White Guy)", along with documentaries on Korn and Sugar Ray. In 1997, he was awarded the Billboard's Pop Video of the Year Award for Smash Mouth's "Walkin' on the Sun" and the Music Video Production Association's Pop Video of the Year Award for Sugar Ray's "Fly". Eventually, this landed him in the television commercial business, directing advertisements for Major League Baseball and Coca-Cola. A notable one was a commercial for Gap, which was honored at the 1999 London International Film Festival.

=== 2000–2007 ===
Impressed with McG's music videos, Drew Barrymore approached him about directing a film adaptation of Charlie's Angels. He accepted, wanting to take on bigger projects, and pitched the movie to the studio executives, who were initially reluctant but later approved the project after much persistence. The film, for which he was paid $350,000, was released in 2000 and went on to gross over $250 million worldwide with mixed critical reception from critics and fans alike. However, he won the Hollywood Breakthrough Award at the 6th Annual Hollywood Film Festival held in 2002. Sony paid him $2.5 million to direct the military action-drama Dreadnought for Red Wagon Entertainment. He was also set to develop a sequel to Charlie's Angels and present his film producing debut with Airshow, the latter of which has yet to be made.

In February 2002, Jon Peters and Lorenzo di Bonaventura attached him onto the fifth installment in the Superman film series that was in development hell, thus putting his previous projects on hold. McG and Peters hired J. J. Abrams to pen a new script for the film entitled Superman: Flyby, which was submitted in July 2002. Bailing out of the project in favor of Charlie's Angels: Full Throttle in September 2002, McG was replaced by Brett Ratner. Meanwhile, he developed and co-created a television series with John McNamara called Fastlane (2002), which was eventually canceled after one season due to the high costs of each episode. Josh Schwartz approached him and his producing partner, Stephanie Savage, about another television series as well, The O.C. (2003), which revolved around the lives of several teenagers based in McG's hometown of Newport Beach. McG was set to direct the pilot, but because of scheduling conflicts with Charlie's Angels: Full Throttle, he was replaced by Doug Liman. The show ended after four seasons in 2007.

The sequel to Charlie's Angels followed in 2003, and although not as successful as the first, Charlie's Angels: Full Throttle (2003) also made over $250 million worldwide. Shortly thereafter, Sony extended its first-look production deal with Wonderland Sound and Vision for an additional three years, with Hot Wheels, Airshow, and Radiant on their film slate. Since then, none of those films have been developed with the former, which was previously supposed to be a directing vehicle for him in 2003 (he later chose to produce instead in 2006), being put into turnaround in 2009.

Warner Bros., still satisfied with his bankability, re-hired him to direct Superman: Flyby in April 2003 after Ratner had dropped out due to casting and pre-production difficulties. During his tenure, McG and the producers spent more than $15 million planning storyboards, concept art, and locations, as well as having script revisions and the film completely pre-visualized. However, McG later left the project, citing his fear of flying to Sydney. This eventually brought Bryan Singer on board in July 2004, resulting in Superman Returns. McG produced the television series, The Mountain (2004), on the same year, also getting canceled after one season.

His next television work was Supernatural (2005), for which he served as an executive producer until 2013. The following year saw Warner Bros. allowing McG, who "looked to improve as a storyteller and wanted to get more substantial material," to direct We Are Marshall (2006), a sports drama film. Although the film received mixed critical reception, McG was complimented for his ability of emotional storytelling. Jessica Reaves of the Chicago Tribune noted that "McG shows new maturity. Scenes that could have been played for ghoulish effect, like the plane crash and its fiery aftermath, are handled with skillful efficiency." At a budget of $35 million, the film only made $43.5 million. He had also produced the horror film Stay Alive (2006), which received largely negative reviews.

Along with Adam Brody, McG was next set to produce a remake of the cult comedy hit Revenge of the Nerds, planned for a release in 2007 with a budget of $12.5 million and filming to begin at Emory University. However, after reviewing the script, university officials backed out two weeks before filming, citing it as "too bawdy." This led the film to be shot at Agnes Scott College for two weeks, but producers Fox Atomic shelved it due to the "lack of wide open space Emory's campus would have afforded them and [the fact that] winter was fast approaching making the prospect of shooting the movie's many outdoor scenes problematic." Furthermore, studio executive Peter Rice was disappointed with the dailies.

In 2007, McG worked mostly on television, producing Pussycat Dolls Present: The Search for the Next Doll (2007) and Chuck (2007). Co-created by Josh Schwartz, his partner on The O.C., he directed the latter's pilot and remained an executive producer throughout the series. Fox had also given a script commitment to Invisible, a television pilot written by Ari Eisner about a criminal who becomes invisible he was supposed to produce, and We Are Marshall writer Jamie Linden was working with him on a TV pilot called Flash Back. However, as of 2011, there have been no updates on these shows.

=== 2007–present ===
On August 2, 2007, McG signed a three-year first-look production deal for his Wonderland Sound and Vision company with Warner Bros., planning to "produce three movies a year" and directing "one of them every year." The first four films set up were Nightcrawlers (now known as Monster Squad), an untitled spy project, Yucatan, and Maintenance. The former, about an aberrant father who must confront his childhood tormentor to rid of his fear of monsters and the dark, was arranged to start in November 2007, but McG dropped out and was later replaced by Mike Mitchell; the untitled spy project was rewritten by Phil Alden Robinson and was to be produced by Basil Iwanyk; Yucatan, based on Steve McQueen's leftover notes and storyboards of his passion project, is an epic adventurous heist film, though Warner Bros. has now placed the project under Team Downey; and Maintenance was a film adaptation of Jim Massey's comic book series of the same name about two janitors who work for a weapons manufacturer that supply to the world's most evil super villains, but the rights of the film have moved to DreamWorks Animation. As a result, none of them will feature the involvement of McG.

On October 30, 2007, Fox approved a pilot for an American remake of the British cult show Spaced, which McG served as an executive producer, even though Simon Pegg and fans were outraged at the prospect of having a remake without the original creators' involvement. Nonetheless, the pilot, written by Adam Barr, was panned before its airing, resulting in Fox scrapping the series. McG then executive produced Pussycat Dolls Present: Girlicious (2008). The Pussycat Dolls Present series was canceled afterward. He was the executive producer for the WB Television Network's online series, Sorority Forever (2008) and Exposed (2010), as well.

McG's next film project was Terminator Salvation (2009), the fourth installment of the Terminator film series that introduces the future war fought between humanity and Skynet. After the Halcyon Company purchased the rights, they signed McG onto the project, for which he was paid $6 million. Although he promised fans that he would bring back credibility to the saga, with the casting of Christian Bale and a personal talk with James Cameron, the film, released on May 21, 2009, in the United States and Canada, received mixed reviews. It grossed $371 million worldwide, well below industry expectations considering its high budget. In promotion of Terminator Salvation, at a Wondercon event, McG harassed actress Moon Bloodgood, asking the audience, “Do you want to see Moon’s boobs?”

Following Terminator Salvation, he was expected to direct a remake of 20,000 Leagues Under the Sea for Disney, for which he was interested in casting Sam Worthington for Captain Nemo. However, after spending nearly $10 million on pre-production work, Walt Disney Studios' movie chief Rich Ross put the project on hold indefinitely due to creative concerns, and McG is no longer attached. Subsequently, he went into negotiations with 20th Century Fox to direct This Means War, a spy comedy project about two best friends who go to war against each other after falling for the same girl. Though initially troubled with numerous casting dropouts, including Bradley Cooper, Seth Rogen, and Sam Worthington, the film was finally filmed in Vancouver and was released in 2012. Since then, he has been in negotiations for the directing duties for Universal Pictures' Oujia (a film based on the Hasbro board game of the same name,) and has been attached to Lorene Scafaria's pitch based on a Rolling Stone article about the true life events of Esther Reed named "The Girl Who Conned the Ivy League," along with Amanda Seyfried, and a high-profile untitled space adventure project written by David Callaham for 20th Century Fox. McG was also in discussions to supervise development and direct the fifth installment of the Terminator film series, having made a $10 million right-of-first-refusal deal with the Halcyon Company, but with the rights of the series transferred to hedge fund Pacificor, his further involvement became unlikely. The film adaptation of Peter M. Lenkov's graphic novel series R.I.P.D. was another project he was circling, but because of his commitment to This Means War, he was replaced by Robert Schwentke. He produced The Duff (2015), a teen comedy based on a book.

McG has also delved into comics with Wonderland set to publish the original Haunted City, written by Chap Taylor, that will expand into a feature film, which he plans to direct, a television show, and a video game.

He has been actively developing a film adaptation of the rock musical Spring Awakening, planning to independently produce and film it in six weeks for $25 million, with additional producing duties for: a film adaptation of Jon Stock's Dead Spy Running novel; I Am A Genius of Unspeakable Evil and I Want to be Your Class President, a film adaptation of the book of the same name by Josh Lieb; Medieval, a film he was previously set to direct but is now being helmed by Rob Cohen; Elysium, a modern retelling of a classic Greek myth written by Matt Cirulnick for New Regency; Medallion, an action thriller starring Nicolas Cage about a former master thief on the search for his kidnapped daughter; Tink, a live action romantic comedy based on Disney's Tinkerbell; and CBS Films' Face It. Other projects he has expressed interest in include a World War II film and an adaptation of Do Androids Dream of Electric Sheep?, which was previously filmed by Ridley Scott as 1982's Blade Runner.

For his television work, Wonderland Sound & Vision sold three pilots for the 09–10 season: Thunder Road, a reality show described as an automobile version of Wipeout, for CBS; Limelight, a contemporary version of Fame based on the life of Pharrell Williams, who was also executive producing, for ABC; and Human Target, loosely based on the comic book of the same name about a bodyguard hired to protect his clients, for Fox. Only the latter ended up airing on network TV, debuting on January 17, 2010, and ending after two seasons. On the same year, The CW gave a series order to Nikita, a remake of La Femme Nikita, which premiered on September 9.

Since 2009, McG and Wonderland Sound & Vision have been lined up to produce numerous shows for a variety of networks: the Josh Friedlander-developed Camp Morningwood; Our Show, an NBC comedy project co-developed with Larry Charles about "a disparate group of people who begin making episodes of their favorite sci-fi show after it ends"; the Danny Comden-penned The Intruders; an untitled space Western conceived by Scott Rosenbaum; and Clive Barker's Hotel for ABC, about "a series of ghoulish incidents at a haunted hotel." However, like the majority of shows that get green-lit every season, none of them has actually aired or picked up for a full season.

As of the early 2010s, the line-up of shows he's been attached to are Zombies vs. Vampires, a buddy cop series about two officers, one of whom is a vampire, that deal with "zombie crimes"; a private eye series named I, PI he co-developed with Paul Scheuring; and the web series Aim High, premiered on October 18, 2011, on Facebook.

On December 11, 2008, he was awarded the Kodak filmmaker of the year by CineAsia.

Takashi Murakami and McG directed short Akihabara Majokko Princess, where Kirsten Dunst sings a cover of The Vapors' 1980 song "Turning Japanese". This was shown at the "Pop Life" exhibition in London's Tate Modern museum from October 1, 2009, to January 17, 2010. It shows Dunst dancing around Akihabara, a shopping district in Tokyo, Japan.

In October 2011 McG was set to direct Puzzle Palace for the Summit Entertainment.

On January 22, 2016, Deadline reported that McG will direct the reboot film for Masters of the Universe and will also oversee a rewrite of the script. It was announced on April 26, 2017, that McG would no longer be directing or involved with the film.

In 2015, McG directed the horror comedy film The Babysitter starring Samara Weaving, Judah Lewis, Hana Mae Lee, Robbie Amell and Bella Thorne. The film was released on Netflix on October 13, 2017. In 2019, McG helmed a sequel, The Babysitter: Killer Queen, which was released on September 10, 2020.

In March 2018, it was reported that McG would direct Rim of the World for Netflix from a screenplay by Zack Stentz. The film was released on May 24, 2019.

== Personal life ==
McG has suffered from agoraphobia. He was unable to board a plane going to Australia to shoot Superman: Flyby and dropped from the film as a result. McG told people he suffered from fear of flying despite the issue being persistent agoraphobia. "It was easier to say it was a fear of flying because, while it might make me look weak, people can understand it and I don't have to say, 'Well, I'm kind of crazy,'" he told Fast Company.

His brother died of a cocaine overdose in 2007, which he says has kept him grounded and reminds him not to take life for granted.

He and actress Bridget Moynahan met on an airplane and dated for a time, starting in late 2010.

McG received an honorary doctorate of fine arts from York College of Pennsylvania on May 14, 2022.

== Filmography ==
=== Film ===
Year	Title	Director	Producer
2000	Charlie's Angels	Yes	No
2003	Charlie's Angels: Full Throttle	Yes	No
2006	We Are Marshall	Yes	Yes
2009	Terminator Salvation	Yes	No
2012	This Means War	Yes	No
2014	3 Days to Kill	Yes	No
2017	The Babysitter	Yes	Yes
2019	Rim of the World	Yes	Yes
2020	The Babysitter: Killer Queen (Note: Also credited as writer)	Yes	Yes
2023	Family Switch	Yes	Yes
2024	Uglies	Yes	Yes
2026	Way of the Warrior Kid	Yes	Yes
TBA	Spy Duo	Yes	

Producer only

- Stay Alive (2006)
- Fantasyland (2010)
- Stolen (2012) – executive producer
- Before We Go (2014)
- Playing It Cool (2014)
- Mercy (2014)
- The DUFF (2015)
- When We First Met (2018)
- I Feel Pretty (2018)
- Tall Girl (2019)
- Holidate (2020)
- Love Hard (2021)
- Tall Girl 2 (2022)
- Música (2024)
- Clashing Through the Snow (TBA)

=== Television ===
Year	Title	Director	Executive producer	Notes
2002	Fastlane	Yes	Yes	Episode: "Pilot"
2007–2012	Chuck	Yes	Yes	Episode: "Pilot"
2013	Guilty	Yes	No	TV movie
2013	Westside	Yes	Yes	ABC pilot
2014	The Mysteries of Laura	Yes	Yes	Episodes: "Pilot" and "The Mystery of the Dead Date"
2015	Kevin From Work	Yes	Yes	Episodes: "Pilot" and "Gossip from Work"
2016–2019	Shadowhunters	Yes	Yes	Episode: "Pilot"
2016–2018	Lethal Weapon	Yes	Yes	Episodes: "Pilot" and "Surf N Turf"
2017	Behind Enemy Lines	Yes	Yes	Unsold pilot
2021	Turner & Hooch	Yes	Yes	Episode: "Forever and a Dog"

Executive producer only

Year	Title	Notes
2003	The Dan Show	TV movie
2003–2007	The O.C.	
2004	The Mountain	
2005–2020	Supernatural	Also executive consultant (seasons 9–15)
2006	The Danny Comden Project	TV movie
2006	Jump	TV movie
2007	Pussycat Dolls Present: The Search for the Next Doll	
2007	Skyler's Revolution	TV movie
2008	Pussycat Dolls Present: Girlicious	
2008	Sorority Forever	Web series
2009	Terminator Salvation: The Machinima Series	Web series
2009	Limelight	TV movie
2010	Exposed	Web series
2010	Thunder Road	TV movie
2010	Our Show	TV movie
2010–2011	Human Target	
2010	Ghostfacers	Web series
2010–2013	Nikita	
2011–2013	Aim High	Web series
2020	Kirby Jenner	
2021	The Winchesters	
2023	True Lies	
