= Judah Lewis =

American actor (born 2000/2001)

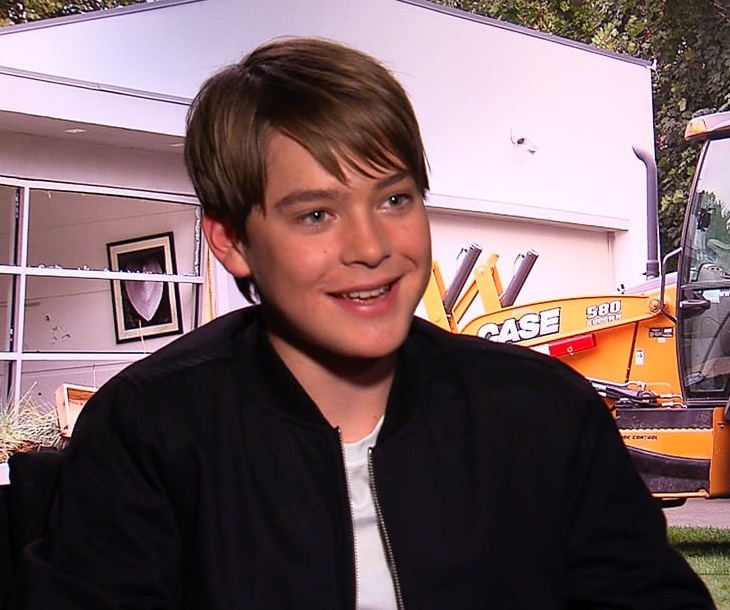
- Lewis in 2016
- Born: 2000/2001 (age 24–25)
- Occupation: Actor
- Years active: 2014–present

Judah Lewis (born 2000 or 2001) is an American actor. He is known for his roles in the films Demolition (2015), The Babysitter (2017), its sequel The Babysitter: Killer Queen (2020), The Christmas Chronicles (2018) and its sequel The Christmas Chronicles 2 (2020).

== Life and career ==
Lewis is the son of Hara and Mark Lewis, who are acting teachers. He is Jewish.

In 2014, Lewis played in the Lifetime television film Deliverance Creek.

In May 2015, Lewis was among the six actors who screen tested for the lead role (which went to Tom Holland) in the 2017 reboot film Spider-Man: Homecoming.

In 2015, Lewis played a supporting role in the comedy-drama film Demolition. He also played in the action thriller remake Point Break, appearing briefly as the young version of the lead character Johnny Utah.

In 2015, Lewis filmed the role of a boy hunted by his babysitter in the comedy horror film The Babysitter. The finished film was acquired by Netflix in December 2016 and was released on October 13, 2017.

In 2018, Lewis co-starred in the Canadian horror mystery film Summer of 84. Lewis played a supporting role in the Netflix family film The Christmas Chronicles. In 2019, he co-starred in the thriller film I See You.

In 2020, he reprised his main role in the comedy horror sequel film The Babysitter: Killer Queen on Netflix. He also reprised his role as Teddy in the sequel film The Christmas Chronicles 2.

In 2023, Lewis starred in the Shudder film Suitable Flesh as Asa Waite. In 2025, he played a younger version of Steven Thomas in the film Lifeline.

== Filmography ==
=== Film ===
Year	Title	Role
2015	Demolition	Chris Moreno
2015	Point Break	Young Johnny Utah
2017	The Babysitter	Cole Johnson
2018	Summer of 84	Tommy "Eats" Eaton
2018	The Christmas Chronicles	Teddy Pierce
2019	I See You	Connor Harper
2020	The Babysitter: Killer Queen	Cole Johnson
2020	The Christmas Chronicles 2	Teddy Pierce
2023	Suitable Flesh	Asa Waite
2025	Lifeline	Young Steven Thomas
2025	The Floaters	Jonah

=== Television ===
Year	Title	Role	Notes
2014	Deliverance Creek	Caleb Barlow	Television film
2015	CSI: Cyber	Denny Metz	1 episode
2016	Game of Silence	Young Gil Harris	5 episodes
