= Sam Shahidi =

American businessman

- Born: August 1, 1983 (age 43)
- Occupations: Software developer, CCO, CPO
- Years active: 2009–present
- Known for: Shots Studios
- Website: shots.com

Sam Shahidi (born August 1, 1983) is a businessperson and co-founder of Shots Podcast Network and CEO of Happy Dad Hard Seltzer. Also, a partner of the popular YouTube group, Nelk Boys.

In 2009, he and his brother John Shahidi started the video game development company RockLive, where they developed mobile games for athletes such as Cristiano Ronaldo and Mike Tyson. In 2013, RockLive became Shots Mobile before becoming Shots Podcast Network.

== Early life ==
He and his older brother John Shahidi grew up in Southern California. He is of Kurdish origin. They were raised by their mother and grandmother.

== Career ==
=== RockLive ===
John and Sam Shahidi started developing iOS apps in 2009 and started out as a video game development company called Rock Software, later renamed RockLive. Their first commercial app was RunPee.

The Shahidis were childhood friends of football players Carson and Jordan Palmer. The Shahidis ran Chad "Ochocinco" Johnson's social media, and developed his two apps, Chad Ochocinco Experience, and its follow-up, MadChad.

Between 2009 and 2012, they developed additional apps for celebrity athletes, including Usain Bolt, Terrell Owens, Ronaldo and Mike Tyson. To promote the game Mike Tyson Main Event in 2011, Shahidi rented a boxing ring during the festival South by Southwest in Austin, Texas, with Tyson making an appearance.

=== Shots app ===
RockLive was rebranded to Shots Mobile. Shots, a selfie photo sharing app, was released in November 2013. It was intended as an anti-bullying social media network. The inspiration for the app came after Facebook was forced take down a page that attracted cyberbullying. As a child, Shahidi had been bullied due to his Iranian Kurdish heritage. In Shots, photos had to be taken real-time, without the use of filters or other editing material and users could not comment on pictures or see how many "likes" other people received. "Your social status doesn't matter inside Shots. It's about expressing your feelings in a picture, which is why we don't allow comments. We never want our users hurt, harmed or bullied by what they read about themselves on social media — it's about signaling what you're feeling inside", Shahidi's brother John said.

Shots had a user base of 10 million people. At one point, Twitter was in talks to buy the app for US$150 million.

Shots raised $15.2 million in funding. Investors included boxer Floyd Mayweather and singer Justin Bieber, who, through involvement in Shots, became friends with the Shahidis. Bieber lost to Shahidi in a drinking contest in September 2015.

In its first 18 months, Shots gained 1.8 million daily active users. Due to the strong competition from other photo and video sharing apps like Instagram and Snapchat, its number of users dropped from 7 million in March 2016 to 2.5 million in October 2016. Notable users included Snoop Dogg, Shaquille O'Neal and future Shots Studios artists Rudy Mancuso and Lele Pons.

=== Shots Studios ===
With the number of Shots users dropping, the Shahidis changed focus from software to content. Following the success of Awkward Puppets, they saw an opportunity in helping development of short form comedy and music videos. Shots was rebranded to Shots Studios, a talent agency and production studio for social media personalities, predominantly on YouTube.

Shahidi is the chief product officer (CPO), chief creative officer (CCO), and head of the engineering division. He often analyzes viewer data on their videos, looking at whether viewers liked or disliked a video, or when a viewer decides to comment. Shahidi said, "Views are nice and our creators get a ton of them, but that's not the metric we look at. Our team really breaks down engagement and watches 'through rates'. We want to make sure our videos are watched until the end because that's what's going to trigger someone to share it". Shots Studios labels itself as a "family" as much as a talent agency and production company.

Videos created by Shots Studios are viewed 40 million minutes per day on YouTube. They created more than 1,000 YouTube videos in two years' time, and they plan on expanding to Spotify, Apple Music, Netflix and YouTube Red. Justin Bieber is an investor and active business partner in Shots Studios.

Shahidi was a co-executive producer on Vai Anitta, a Netflix original docu-series that followed Anitta.

Both Shahidi brothers were honored by Billboard as Latin Power Players for their success in developing the Latin American music careers of Brazilian singer Anitta and Venezuelan-Italian artist Lele Pons.

Along with his brother, Shahidi executive produced The Secret Life of Lele Pons, a Shots Studios-produced YouTube Originals docuseries offering a behind-the-scenes look at the titular star's previously-unknown relationship with various mental health conditions. They also produced "Best Kept Secrets with Lele Pons," a Spotify-exclusive podcast hosted by Pons that invites guests to share deeply personal experiences.

=== Full Send ===
In 2020, Shahidi joined the Full Send / Nelk team when his brother John became President of the company.

In May 2021, Shahidi helped brother John and Nelk launch Happy Dad|Happy Dad Hard Seltzer. Shahidi is the CEO.

== Other endeavors ==
Shahidi was part of the unveiling of the new uniforms of the Golden State Warriors in September 2014. A selfie with Harrison Barnes was retweeted 4,700 times.
