= Música (soundtrack) =

Música (Original Motion Picture Soundtrack)

Soundtrack album by Rudy Mancuso
- Released: April 4, 2024
- Recorded: 2022–2023
- Genre: Film score; film soundtrack
- Length: 32:01
- Label: Milan
- Producer: Rudy Mancuso

Música (Original Motion Picture Soundtrack) is the soundtrack album to the 2024 film Música directed, written and composed by Rudy Mancuso who also stars in the film alongside Camila Mendes. The soundtrack featured 18 songs composed by Mancuso and fellow screenwriter Dan Lagana serving as co-composer and the album was released through Milan Records on April 4, 2024, the same day as the film.

== Background and development ==
Mancuso composed the film's music besides his stint to acting, directing and screenwriting with Lagana who served as the co-composer. In a reverse engineering method, Mancuso wrote and composed the music even before the film was in scripting stage so that he envisions the sounds he intended while making the film, so that he could avoid re-recordings or overdub and mostly used live recording for the music and sound design. His experiences on directing and enacting in music videos often helped him to provide an insight on the musical setpieces. Mancuso considered the film an "anti-musical" where unlike most musical films where characters break into songs, the music had been woven into the narrative.

The significance of synesthesia in the narrative prompted Mancuso to utilize objects as sounds. The executive music producer Jamie Rise brought pots and pans from a supply store in Newark which had been utilized as musical instruments. Furthermore, the team brought stompers and street drum corps to create rhythms using miscellaneous objects and more than 90 microphones were hidden in the objects used in diner sequence to capture the rhythmic sounds.

Mancuso's earlier experience on joining a percussion troupe in school had influenced him to use percussions and drums, as well as guitar and piano for the instrumentation. The soundtrack had been influenced by bossa nova and samba genres owing to Mancuso's Brazilian heritage. Several Brazilian instruments had been used in the score. Mancuso composed a central melody that has been slowed down for romantic moments and sped up for rhythmic sequences. The editing process went on for months, as Mancuso had to sync those scenes with the music.

Andy Muschietti who appeared in a cameo role, also featured in performing three of the songs with the fictional band in the film. The puppet Diego, which appeared in Mancuso's Awkward Puppets channel had also performed two songs for the film's soundtrack.

== Release ==
The soundtrack was released on April 4, 2024, coinciding with the Prime Video release. It was distributed by Milan Records.

== Reception ==
Carlos Aguilar of Variety added that "musical numbers rarely feature any lyrics [and] instead play out like a whimsical whirlwind". Rafael Motamayor of IndieWire wrote "most of the music is composed of mundane, diegetic sounds like a broom sweeping, a door opening, or even footsteps, and yet they still make for an entertaining and compelling soundtrack." Johnny Loftus of Decider wrote "the film's traditional coming-of-age, rom-com beats are heightened by the actual beats and melodies in the music that constantly flows through it". Nadira Goffe of Slate complimented Mancuso's "astronomical musical talent", which was reminiscent of musician Jacob Collier, being the heart of the film with its music and soundtrack. Ferdosa Abdi of Screen Rant wrote "The musical interludes are used sparingly and never outstay their welcome".

== Track listing ==
No.	Title	Artist(s)	Length
1.	"Diner"		1:34
2.	"Change Your Ways"	Rudy Mancuso and the Música Band feat. Andy Muschietti	1:07
3.	"Shit"		0:50
4.	"Fish Market"		1:01
5.	"Ironbound Fair"		1:16
6.	"The Park"		1:06
7.	"Bus Rides"		1:02
8.	"Change Is Good"	Rudy Mancuso and the Música Band feat. Andy Muschietti	1:08
9.	"Maria's Salon"		0:47
10.	"Hospital"		0:47
11.	"Rhythm of Lies"		4:24
12.	"Isabella"		1:42
13.	"Change the Change"	Rudy Mancuso and the Música Band feat. Andy Muschietti	1:25
14.	"Loser Montage"		1:03
15.	"I'm a Bitch"	Rudy Mancuso and the Música Band feat. Diego the Puppet	1:53
16.	"Isabella" (Reprise)		2:13
17.	"Why Is Everyone Annoying?"	Rudy Mancuso and the Música Band feat. Diego the Puppet	2:37
18.	"Musica"		6:06
Total length:			32:01

== Accolades ==
Awards	Date of ceremony	Category	Recipient(s) and nominee(s)	Result	Ref.
Imagen Awards	September 8, 2024	Best Music Composition for Film or Television	Rudy Mancuso	Nominated	
