= 2019 Premios Juventud =

Premios Juventud 2019
- Date: July 18, 2019
- Location: Watsco Center, Coral Gables, Florida
- Country: United States (US)
- Hosted by: Lali; CNCO; Alejandra Espinoza

Highlights
- Most awards: Anuel AA (3); Bad Bunny (3); Cardi B (3)
- Most nominations: Maluma (8)

Television/radio coverage
- Network: Univision
- Viewership: 1.93 million

The 2019 Premios Juventud ceremony was held on July 18, 2019. Univision broadcast the show live from the Watsco Center in Coral Gables, Florida. Argentine singer and actress Lali, boy band CNCO and Mexican-American TV presenter Alejandra Espinoza hosted the ceremony.

Premios Juventud aims to inspire, motivate and empower Latino youth to become leaders for change. The awards celebrate the current trends in pop culture, music, digital, fashion, television and social media. Maluma had the most nominations with eight, followed by Bad Bunny behind with seven. Bad Bunny, Anuel AA and Cardi B won the most awards of the night, with three each.

Maluma and Jesse & Joy were the first artists to receive the Agente de Cambio Award honoring their humanitarian work. Two young Latinos, Alondra Toledo and Carlos Osuna, were also honored with the trophy for their leadership and positive contributions to the community.

== Performers ==
Artist(s)	Song(s)
Pre-show
Daniel El Travieso	"Seguimos Siendo Panas"
Camilo	"No Te Vayas"
Amara La Negra	"What A Bam Bam"
Tito El Bambino	"Pega Pega"
Main show
Karol G	"Ocean"
Mau y Ricky; Sebastian Yatra; Camilo	"Ya No Tiene Novio" "La Boca" "Desconocidos"
Sech	"Otro Trago"
Myke Towers	"Si Se Da"
Guaynaa	"Rebota"
Rauw Alejandro	"Que Le De"
Lunay; Daddy Yankee; Chris Jedi; Gaby Music	"Soltera (Remix)"
Christian Nodal	"De Los Besos Que Te Di"
Anuel AA	"Por Ley" "Amanece"
Natti Natasha	"Oh Daddy"
Dalex; Sech; Cazzu; Feid; Rafa Pabön	"Pa Mi (Remix)"
Farruko; Anuel AA	"Delincuente"
Christian Nodal; Ángela Aguilar; Pipe Bueno	"Volver Volver" "Sombras"; Mi Gusto Es" "Cielito Lindo"
CNCO	"De Cero"
Silvestre Dangond; Cedric Gervais	"El Santo Cachón (Remix)" "Summertime Sadness (Remix)"
Sebastián Yatra; Tini	"Cristina"
Maluma; Sech; Farruko; Lenny Tavarez; Dalex	"HP" "Qué Más Pues (Remix)"
Cazzu	"Visto a Las 00:00"
Eladio Carrion	"Mi Error"
Amenazzy	"Baby"
Lyanno	"Pa Que Vuelvas"
Pitbull; Daddy Yankee; Natti Natasha	"No Lo Trates"
Jesse & Joy	"Mañana Es Too Late"
Romeo Santos; El Chaval de la Bachata; Frank Reyes	"Payasos" "Masoquismo"
Pedro Capó; Farruko; Lali	"Calma (Remix)"
Reykon; Maluma	"Latina"
Miky Woodz; Chencho Corleone	"Impaciente"
R.K.M & Ken-Y	"Cuando Lo Olvides"

== Presenters ==
- Isabela Moner, Eugenio Derbez, Eva Longoria and Jeff Wahlberg – presented Singer + Songwriter + Composer award
- Renata Notni and Sebastián Rulli – introduced Dalex, Sech, Cazzu, Feid and Rafa Pabön
- Sebastián Yatra – presented Best LOL Award
- Pepe Aguilar – introduced Christian Nodal, Ángela Aguilar and Pipe Bueno
- Sebastián Villalobos – introduced CNCO
- Karol Sevilla – introduced Silvestre Dangond and Cedric Gervais
- Mané de la Parra and Michelle Renaud – introduced Sebastián Yatra and Tini
- Cierra Ramirez – introduced Cazzu, Eladio Carrion, Amenazzy and Lyanno
- Maite Perroni – presented Regional Roots 2.0 award
- Amara La Negra and Gerardo Ortiz – introduced Romeo Santos, El Chaval de la Bachata and Frank Reyes
- Jesse & Joy – introduced Daniel Habif
- Pabllo Vittar, Emilia and Chesca – introduced Pedro Capó, Farruko and Lali
- Emilio Osorio and Joaquín Bondoni – introduced Reykon and Maluma

== Nominations ==
The official nominees were revealed on May 21, 2019. Maluma had the most nominations with eight, followed by Bad Bunny and Daddy Yankee behind with seven each, and Becky G, Anuel AA, J Balvin and Karol G all with six. Anuel AA, Bad Bunny and Cardi B had the most wins of the night, taking home three awards each, followed by Daddy Yankee, Karol G and Maluma, who won two each.

=== Music ===
Best Song: Can't Get Enough of This Song	Best Song: Singing in the Shower
"Calma (Remix)" – Pedro Capó and Farruko; "Ella Quiere Beber" – Anuel AA and Romeo Santos; "Mia" – Bad Bunny featuring Drake; "A Través del Vaso" – Banda Los Sebastianes; "Por Siempre Mi Amor" – Banda MS; "Por Qué Cambiaste de Opinión" – Calibre 50; "Adictiva" – Daddy Yankee and Anuel AA; "Con Calma" – Daddy Yankee featuring Snow; "Créeme" – Karol G and Maluma; "Un Año" – Sebastián Yatra and Reik	"Secreto" – Anuel AA and Karol G; "Por Siempre Mi Amor" – Banda MS; "Con Calma" – Daddy Yankee featuring Snow; "Con Todo Incluido" – La Adictiva; "Imposible" – Luis Fonsi and Ozuna; "Sola" – Manuel Turizo; "Desconocidos" – Mau y Ricky, Manuel Turizo and Camilo; "Me Gusta" – Natti Natasha; "Calma (Remix)" – Pedro Capó and Farruko; "El Lujo de Tenerte" – Regulo Caro
Best Song: The Traffic Jam	Sick Dance Routine (Best Choreography)
"Ella Quiere Beber" – Anuel AA and Romeo Santos; "Mia" – Bad Bunny featuring Drake; "No Te Contaron Mal" – Christian Nodal; "Con Calma" – Daddy Yankee featuring Snow; "Reggaetón" – J Balvin; "Calma (Remix)" – Pedro Capó and Farruko; "Baila, Baila, Baila" – Ozuna; "Aerolínea Carrillo" – T3R Elemento featuring Gerardo Ortiz; "Reggaetón en Lo Oscuro" – Wisin & Yandel; "Un Año" – Sebastián Yatra and Reik	"Con Calma" – Daddy Yankee featuring Snow; "La Respuesta" – Becky G and Maluma; "Pretend" – CNCO; "Punto G" – Karol G; "Caliente" – Lali featuring Pabllo Vittar; "Con Altura" – Rosalía and J Balvin featuring El Guincho; "HP" – Maluma; "Me Gusta" – Natti Natasha; "Baila, Baila, Baila" – Ozuna; "RIP" – Sofía Reyes featuring Rita Ora and Anitta
Singer + Songwriter + Composer (Best Singer-Songwriter)	New to the US, but big at home (Best New Artist)
Daddy Yankee; Bad Bunny; Espinoza Paz; Maluma; Ozuna	Rosalía; Cazzu; Lali; Paulo Londra; TINI
Producer You Know by Shout-Out (Best Producer)	The New Urban Generation (Best New Urban Artist)
DJ Luian and Mambo Kingz; Chris Jedi; Gaby Music; Hi Music Hi Flow; Ovy on the Drums; Play-N-Skillz; Saga WhiteBlack; Sergio George; Sky; Tainy	Amenazzy; Camilo; Dalex; DaniLeigh; Eladio Carrión; Lyanno; Paloma Mami; Rombai; Sech
Regional Roots 2.0 (Best Regional Mexican Artist)	The New Regional Mexican Generation (Best New Regional Mexican Artist)
Christian Nodal; Álex Fernández; Ángela Aguilar; El Bebeto; Pipe Bueno	T3R Elemento; El Fantasma; Fuerza Regida; Kanales; Lenin Ramírez
Best Reality Show Break-Out Artist	This Is a BTS (Best Behind the Scenes)
Cardi B; Amara La Negra; Carlos Rivera; CNCO; Greeicy	"Taki Taki" – DJ Snake featuring Selena Gomez, Ozuna and Cardi B; "I Can't Get Enough" – Benny Blanco, Tainy, Selena Gomez and J Balvin; "Temes" – iLe; "La Plata" – Juanes featuring Lalo Ebratt; "Lost in the Middle of Nowhere" – Kane Brown featuring Becky G; "Créeme" – Karol G and Maluma; "Desconocidos" – Mau y Ricky, Manuel Turizo and Camilo; "Tu Vida en La Mía" – Marc Anthony; "Lindo Pero Bruto" – Thalía and Lali; "Atado entre Tus Manos" – Tommy Torres and Sebastián Yatra

=== Social ===
Can't Get Enough... (Best Social Artist)	Best Scroll Stopper
Bad Bunny; Ángela Aguilar; Anuel AA; Becky G; Chiquis Rivera; Luis Coronel; Natti Natasha; Nicky Jam; T3R Elemento; Ulises Chaidez	Bad Bunny; Becky G; Chiquis Rivera; Christian Nodal; J Balvin; Jennifer Lopez; Mau y Ricky; Nicky Jam; Thalía; Will Smith
Couples that Fire Up My Feed (Best Couple)	Triple Threat (Best Influencer)
Anuel AA and Karol G; Becky G and Sebastian Lletget; Chiquis Rivera and Lorenzo Méndez; Jennifer Lopez and Alex Rodriguez; Prince Royce and Emeraude Toubia	Lele Pons; Baby Ariel; Camila Mendes; Rudy Mancuso; Sebastián Villalobos
On The Rise (Best New Influencer)	Name a Better Duo (Best Influencer Duo)
Lunay; Ángela Aguilar; Cierra Ramirez; Isabela Moner; Ryan Garcia	Catherine Paiz and Austin McBroom; Juanpa Zurita and Rudy Mancuso; Karina García and Mayra García; Niki and Gabi; Sebastián Villalobos and María Laura
Best LOL Award (Best Comedy-Creator Influencer)	Living Your Best Life (Best Committed Influencer)
Daniel El Travieso; Eric Ochoa; Jiapsi Yañez; Mario Aguilar; The Crazy Gorilla	Juanpa Zurita; Ana Alvarado; Bella Thorne; Jaden Smith; Lin-Manuel Miranda

=== Fashion ===
High Fashion	Street Style
Maluma; Daddy Yankee; Natalia Jiménez; Ricky Martin; Sofia Carson	Bad Bunny; J Balvin; Jennifer Lopez; Karol G; Nicky Jam
Shoe-Aholic	Hair Obsessed
Cardi B; Becky G; Maluma; Paulina Rubio; Wisin	J Balvin; Bad Bunny; Jennifer Lopez; Maluma; Thalía

=== Agentes de Cambio Award ===
Winners:

- Maluma
- Jesse & Joy
- Alejandra Toledo
- Carlos Osuna

== Multiple nominations and awards ==
The following received multiple nominations:

Eight:

- Maluma

Seven:

- Bad Bunny
- Daddy Yankee

Six:

- Anuel AA
- Becky G
- J Balvin
- Karol G

Five:

- Ozuna

Four:

- Jennifer Lopez
- Snow

Three:

- Ángela Aguilar
- Camilo
- Cardi B
- Chiquis Rivera
- Christian Nodal
- Farruko
- Lali
- Manuel Turizo
- Mau y Ricky
- Natti Natasha
- Nicky Jam
- Pedro Capó
- Sebastián Yatra
- T3R Elemento
- Thalía

Two:

- Banda MS
- CNCO
- Drake
- Juanpa Zurita
- Reik
- Romeo Santos
- Rosalía
- Rudy Mancuso
- Sebastián Villalobos
- Selena Gomez
- Tainy

The following won multiple awards:

Three:

- Anuel AA
- Bad Bunny
- Cardi B

Two:

- Daddy Yankee
- Karol G
- Maluma
