= Anwar Jibawi =

Palestinian-American internet personality (born 1991)

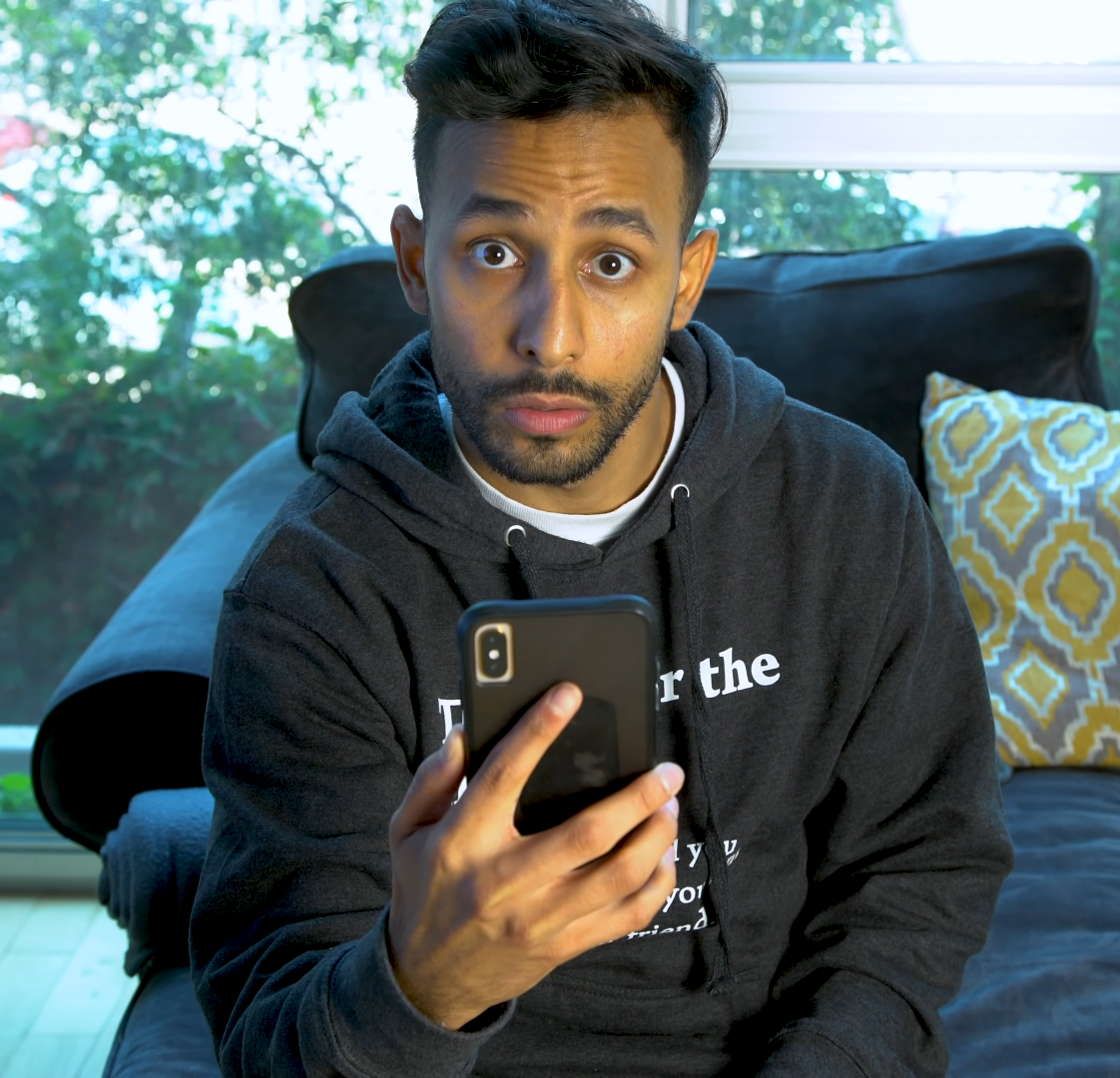
- Jibawi in 2019
- Born: August 9, 1991 (age 35); Chicago, Illinois, U.S.
- Occupation: YouTuber

YouTube information
- Channel: Anwar Jibawi
- Years active: 2013–present
- Genres: Comedy; acting
- Subscribers: 15.6 million
- Views: 9.4 billion
- Last updated: November 10, 2026

Anwar Jibawi (Arabic: أنور جباوي; born August 9, 1991) is an American YouTuber notable for his comedy acting videos on YouTube, formerly on the Vine app.

Jibawi mostly creates comedic content and has over 14 million subscribers on YouTube and over 20 million followers on Instagram. He is managed by John Shahidi of Shots Podcast Network.

== Career ==
Jibawi started his Internet career on Vine. He partnered with John Shahidi to create videos and launched his YouTube channel July 2016. In January 2017, Jibawi helped launch Mike Tyson's YouTube page and he and Tyson have frequently collaborated on one another's channels. Jibawi had a role in the movie Keys of Christmas with Rudy Mancuso, Mariah Carey and DJ Khaled. Jibawi is managed by John Shahidi of Shots Podcast Network, a company that also produces his YouTube content. He was invited by Dolce & Gabbana to walk in their Milan Men's Fashion Week Spring/Summer 2018 show on June 17, 2017.

In February 2018, Jibawi directed a music video for Anitta's Vai Malandra (Remix) by Alesso and KO:YU. The video featured Jibawi and friends dancing to the remix in a farm setting.

Working alongside his friends Hannah Stocking, Lele Pons, and Rudy Mancuso he appeared in the company's Amigos comedy series.

Working with comedic star Marlon Wayans, they created two YouTube videos, one for each of their channels, with production by Shots Studios. Jibawi featured wrestling legend Ric Flair in his "Best Excuse Ever" video.

In November 2018, Jibawi directed the music video for Aitana and Lele Pons' Teléfono (Remix), which has reached over 35 million views on YouTube. In June 2018, he launched a new series, One Star with Anwar, on Instagram's new IGTV platform where he reviews terrible items found online shopping. Jibawi has produced sponsored videos working with companies such as Universal Studios Orlando and The Walking Dead. He appeared in a video for Brita water filters with basketball star Stephen Curry.

== Filmography ==
Year	Title	Role	Notes
2019	Airplane Mode	Himself	
2023	Family Switch	Thunder	
