= Hannah Stocking =

American Internet personality (born 1992)

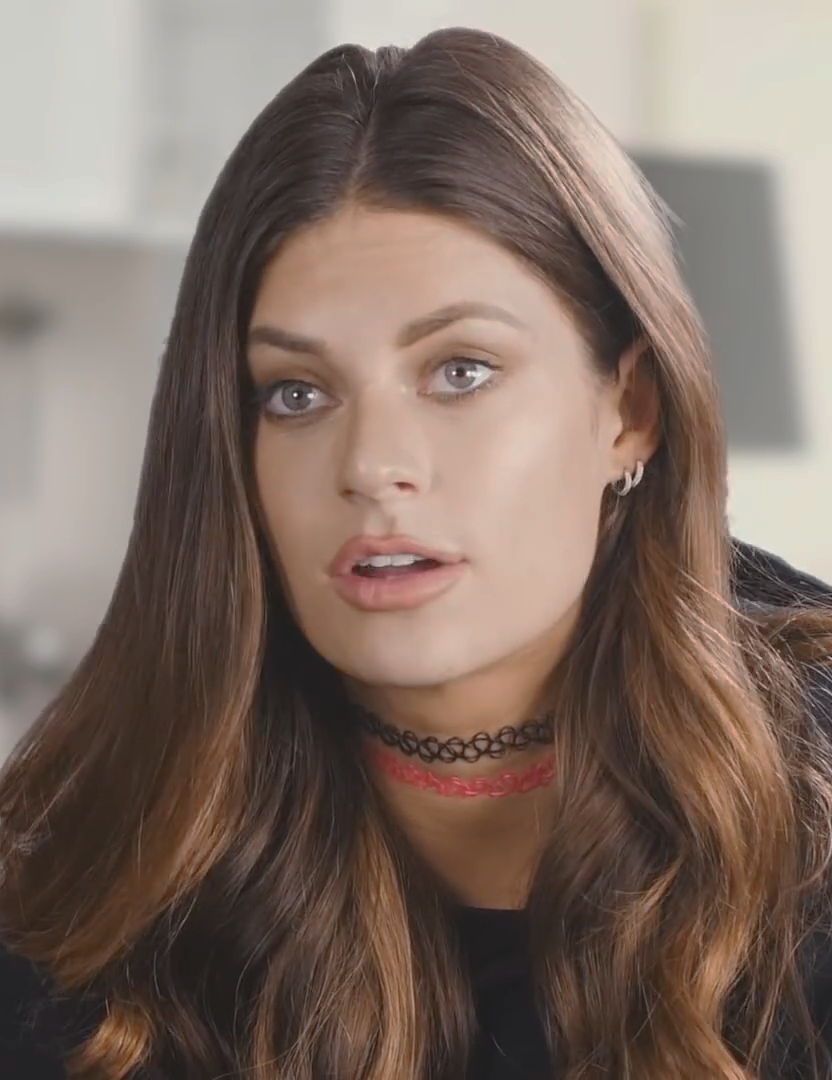
- Stocking in 2019
- Born: 1992 or 1993 (age 33–34)
- Education: Ashland High School; Dominican University of California
- Occupations: Internet personality; actress; comedian
- Years active: 2013–present

YouTube information
- Channel: Hannah Stocking
- Genres: Comedy; vlogs
- Subscribers: 10.4 million
- Views: 5.022 billion
- Last updated: 23 April 2026

Hannah Stocking is an American comedian and internet personality who first gained recognition from the social media platform Vine. She later became known for her comedy videos on YouTube.

Stocking has over 10.4 million subscribers on YouTube, 26.4 million followers on Instagram, and 27.9 million followers on TikTok. She is the host of Mindie, a YouTube Music talk show produced by Shots Studios.

== Life and career ==
Hannah Stocking is the daughter of Jon Stocking and Holly, née Siagkris. She has a sister, Ruby. She is of mainly Greek, but also of Armenian, Ukrainian and Hungarian descent. She attended Ashland High School in Ashland, Oregon, where she was a three-year varsity volleyball player. Afterward, Stocking moved back to California to attend Dominican University of California in San Rafael, where she studied biology and chemistry and continued playing volleyball.

She appeared in G-eazy's music video "Tumblr Girls" in 2015 and starred in Blink-182's "She's Out of Her Mind" video in 2016 with Lele Pons and Vale Genta. She also played the role of Anna in Tyler Perry's horror-comedy sequel Boo 2! A Madea Halloween.

Stocking partnered in February 2018 with ATTN, a media company focused on creating content surrounding important societal topics, to create science-based videos for her YouTube channel. In April 2018, she created and starred in the official lyric video for Poo Bear, Justin Bieber, and Jay Electronica's single "Hard 2 Face Reality", which also featured Lele Pons. In June 2018, she launched the educational series The Science of Beauty on Instagram's IGTV platform.

== Filmography ==
Film

Year	Title	Role	Notes
2017	Boo 2! A Madea Halloween	Anna	
2019	Satanic Panic	Kristen Larson	
2021	Vanquish	Galyna	
2023	Family Switch	Lightning	
2025	Skillhouse	Lauren Swick	
2025	The Wrong Paris	Eve	

Television

Year	Title	Role	Notes
2019–2020	The Set Up	Mia Weber	Main role
2022–2023	iCarly	Sunny Johnson	2 episodes
2023	Dhar Mann	Hannah	Episode: "KID PRANKS Babysitter GOES TOO FAR Ft. @HannahStocking and @AdamW"
2026	Unwell Winter Games	Contestant	YouTube series; 3 episodes
2026	Special Forces: World's Toughest Test	Contestant	Contestant; Season 5

== See also ==
- Anwar Jibawi
- Dhar Mann
