= The Secret Life of Lele Pons =

2020 web series

- Genre: Documentary
- Directed by: Alicia Zubikowski
- Starring: Lele Pons
- Country of origin: United States
- Original language: English
- No. of seasons: 1
- No. of episodes: 5

Production
- Executive producers: John Shahidi; Sam Shahidi
- Production company: Shots Studios

Original release
- Network: YouTube
- Release: May 19, 2020

The Secret Life of Lele Pons is a biographical docuseries about YouTube star Lele Pons, produced by Shots Studios, directed by Emmy-award winner Alicia Zubikowski. The first episode was released on Pons' YouTube channel on May 19, 2020.

== Synopsis ==
The five-episode series follows Venezuelan-American entertainer Lele Pons' battles with mental health issues, specifically centering on her Tourette syndrome and obsessive–compulsive disorder (OCD). Pons was first diagnosed with OCD in 2010 when she was thirteen and living in Miami, Florida. Since then, Pons has risen to prominence through comedy and music.

The series focuses on her day-to-day struggles with her conditions behind her online persona, capturing intimate moments of the Internet personality with her family and friends. The series explores some of the most emotional points of her journey—going behind-the-scenes as Pons broke down in tears during a record session in the studio—as she has tried to juggle her conditions, fame, and a personal life.

== Production and release ==
Variety announced the series on April 22, 2020, and Pons shared a trailer on her YouTube channel. The series premiered on YouTube on May 19, 2020. The docuseries was filmed over the course of two years, starting in 2018.

The series is part of a slate of YouTube Originals launched during the COVID-19 pandemic to support the platform's Stay Home #WithMe movement, an effort to encourage social distancing through informative and entertaining content by notable creators.

== See also ==
- Notable individuals with Tourette syndrome
