= Mike Majlak =

American YouTuber and author (born 1985)

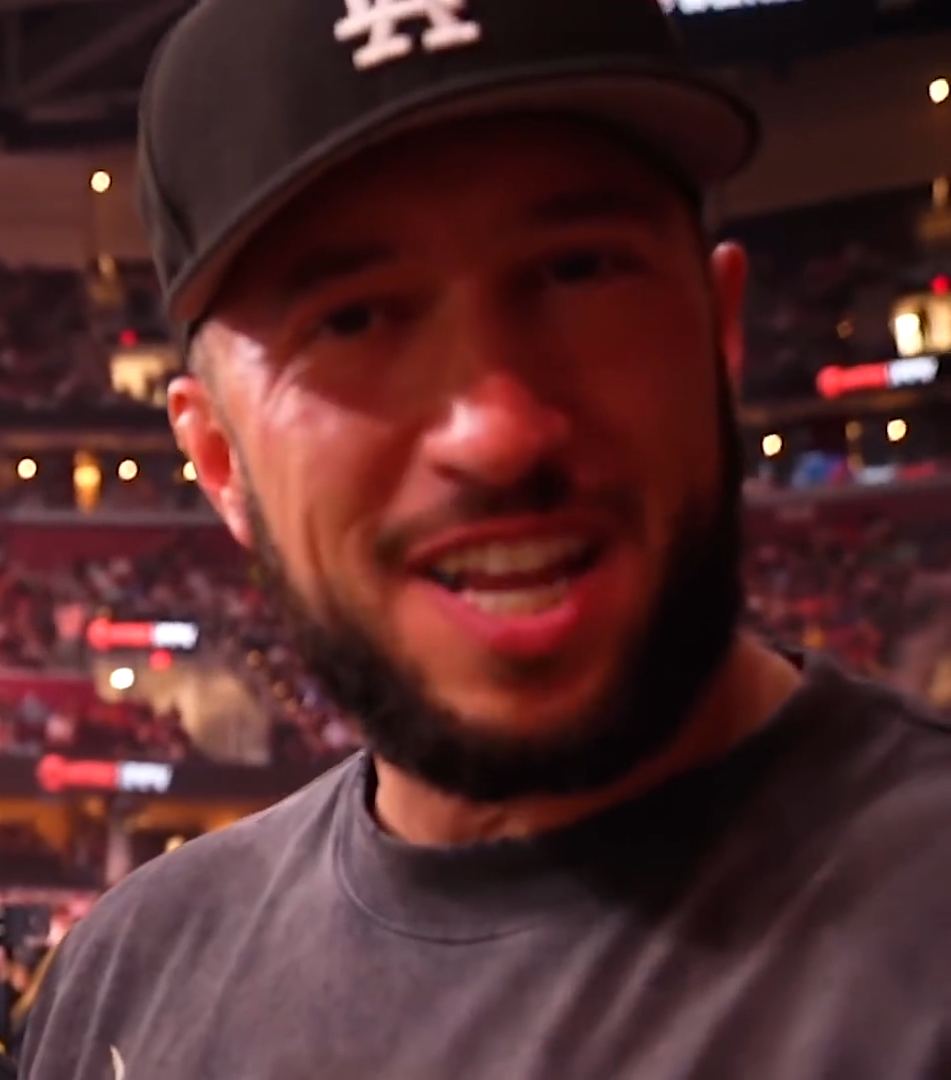
- Majlak in 2021
- Born: Michael Majlak; January 13, 1985 (age 41); Milford, Connecticut, U.S.
- Occupations: YouTuber; author

Instagram information
- Page: heybigmike
- Followers: 1.5 million

YouTube information
- Channels: Mike Majlak; IMPAULSIVE
- Genre: Vlog
- Subscribers: 2.75 million
- Views: 541 million
- Last updated: March 19, 2026

Mike Majlak (born January 13, 1985) is an American YouTuber and author. He is best known as the co-host of the Impaulsive channel alongside Logan Paul. He also co-authored the USA Today–bestselling memoir The Fifth Vital.

== Early life ==
Majlak was born and raised in Milford, Connecticut, the son of Michael and Robin Majlak. After he spent his late teens and early twenties addicted to OxyContin and heroin, he overcame substance abuse in 2010.

== Career ==
Majlak began his career in marketing, working as the marketing manager for furniture retailer LoveSac, where he met social media personality Logan Paul. According to The Verge, after Paul's suicide forest scandal in Japan, he hired Majlak to "babysit" him, causing Majlak to buy a house in Los Angeles and move there. Majlak found success through his work with Impaulsive, where he is an executive partner and co-hosts with Paul. In addition to Impaulsive, Majlak maintains his own YouTube channel and has a social media following of over 6 million followers. In 2020, he co-authored his USA Today–bestselling memoir The Fifth Vital with Riley J. Ford. In his book, he details his experiences with opioid addiction and recovery.

== Filmography ==
=== Television ===
Year	Show	Role	Platform	Episode/Title
2019	Flat Earth: To The Edge And Back	Himself	YouTube Premium	1 -
2020	Ridiculousness	Himself	MTV	28; Bustedness
2020	Ridiculousness	Himself	MTV	29; Bustedness II
2020	Best Kept Secrets with Lele Pons	Himself	Spotify	10; Mike Majlak's Best Kept Secret
2022	Crown Jewel	Himself	WWE	4 Crown Jewel Riyadh

== Personal life ==
He was in a relationship with former adult film actress Lana Rhoades.
