= 2017 MTV MIAW Awards =

Annual Latin American music awards 2017

MTV MIAW Awards 2017
- Date: June 3, 2017
- Location: Palacio de los Deportes, Mexico City
- Hosted by: Lele Pons; Juanpa Zurita
- Website: miaw.mtvla.com

Television/radio coverage
- Network: MTV Latin America

The 5th Annual MTV MIAW Awards were held on June 3, 2017 at the Palacio de los Deportes in Mexico City, and was broadcast on June 4, 2017 through MTV Latin America. The awards celebrate the best of Latin music and the digital world of the millennial generation. The ceremony was hosted by Lele Pons and Juanpa Zurita. J Balvin and Sebastián Yatra led nominations with five each, while Lali was the biggest winner of the night, with two awards. Furthermore, Lady Gaga received the UNHCR's Change Agent Award.

== Performances ==
Artist(s)	Song(s)
Maluma	"Cuatro Babys" "Chantaje"
Morat	"Como Te Atreves"
Natalia Lafourcade; Café Tacvba	"Tu Sí Sabes Quererme" (Natalia Lafourcade) "Futuro" "Las flores" (Cafe Tacvba)
Lali	"Soy" "Boomerang"
Ed Sheeran	"Castle on the Hill"^{[a]}
Sebastián Yatra; Nacho	"Traicionera" "Alguien Robo"
Iggy Azalea	"Mo Bounce" "Switch"

Notes

- ^{^[a]} Sheeran's performance was pre-recorded.

== Presenters ==
- Anitta and Sebastian Villalobos — presented Mexican Instagrammer of the Year
- Rudy Mancuso and Mario Ruiz — presented Colombian Artist of the Year
- Alex Strecci and Lola Club — presented Best YouTube Collaboration
- La Divaza and Juana Martinez — presented Best Pop Artist
- Chumel Torres — presented Male Instagrammer of the Year and Female Instagrammer of the Year
- Tessa Ía and Axel Muñiz — introduced Natalia Lafourcade
- CD9 — introduced War for the Planet of the Apes trailer
- Los Polinesios — presented Freshest Face
- Acapulco Shore cast — presented Viral Bomb
- Facundo — presented UNHCR's Change Agent Award
- YosStop and Fernando Lozada — introduced Sebastián Yatra
- Nath Campos — presented Video of the Year
- Rudy Mancuso — presented International Hit of the Year
- Mario Bautista — presented MIAW Icon of the Year

== Winners and nominees ==
Nominees were announced on April 24, 2017. Winners are listed in bold.

=== Music ===
Video of the Year	Hit of the Year
"Futuro" – Cafe Tacvba; "Los Angeles" – Illya Kuryaki and the Valderramas; "Safari" – J Balvin ft. Pharrell, BIA and Sky; **"Ego" – Lali**; "Amárrame" – Mon Laferte ft. Juanes; "La China" – Porter; "Somos Anormales" – Residente; "Tarde" – Siddhartha	**"Reggaetón Lento (Bailemos)" – CNCO**; "Duele el Corazón" – Enrique Iglesias ft. Wisin; "Dueles" – Jesse & Joy; "El Perdedor" – Maluma; "Cómo Te Atreves" – Morat; "Me Llamas" – Piso 21; "Traicionera" – Sebastián Yatra; "Otra Vez" – Zion & Lennox ft. J Balvin
International Hit of the Year	Collaboration of the Year
"24K Magic" – Bruno Mars; "Let Me Love You" – DJ Snake ft. Justin Bieber; "One Dance" – Drake; "Shape of You" – Ed Sheeran; **"Perfect Illusion" – Lady Gaga**; "Green Light" – Lorde; "I Feel It Coming" – The Weeknd ft. Daft Punk; "Heathens" – Twenty One Pilots	"This Is What You Came For" – Calvin Harris ft. Rihanna; "Despacito" – Luis Fonsi ft. Daddy Yankee and Justin Bieber; "Safari" – J Balvin ft. Pharrell, BIA and Sky; "Cold Water" – Major Lazer ft. MØ and Justin Bieber; "Amárrame" – Mon Laferte ft. Juanes; "Chantaje" – Shakira ft. Maluma; "Closer" – The Chainsmokers ft. Halsey; **"I Don't Wanna Live Forever" – ZAYN and Taylor Swift**
Best Party Anthem	Best Pop Artist
"La Bicicleta" – Carlos Vives and Shakira; "Me Rehúso" – Danny Ocean; **"Despacito" – Luis Fonsi ft. Daddy Yankee**; "Llamame Más Temprano" – Mano Arriba; "El Amante" – Nicky Jam; "Me Llamas" (Remix) – Piso 21 ft. Maluma; "Vente Pa' Ca" – Ricky Martin ft. Maluma; "Vacaciones" – Wisin	CD9; CNCO; Lali; Morat; Piso 21; Sebastián Yatra; **Sofía Reyes**
Best DJ	Argentine Artist of the Year
Alok; Calvin Harris; DJ Snake; Major Lazer; **Martin Garrix**; The Chainsmokers; Tom & Collins; Zedd	Airbag; Carajo; **Lali**; Turf; Será Pánico
Colombian Artist of the Year	Mexican Artist of the Year
J Balvin; **Maluma**; Manuel Medrano; Piso 21; Sebastián Yatra	Cafe Tacvba; Jesse & Joy; León Lárregui; **Mon Laferte**; Natalia Lafourcade

=== Movies and Television ===
Movie of the Year	TV series of the year
Fifty Shades Darker; La La Land; Logan; Star Wars: Rogue One; **Suicide Squad**	Club de Cuervos; Legends of Tomorrow; **Stranger Things**; The Walking Dead; Vikings

=== Digital world ===
MIAW Icon of the Year	Best Performance in an App
Chummel Torres; Fernanfloo; **Juanpa Zurita**; Los Polinesios; Lucas Castel; Luisito Comunica; Mario Ruiz; Yosstop	**Caeli**; CNCO; Eiza González; Harold Azuara; J Balvin; Jimena Sanchez; Sebastian Villalobos
Worldwide Instagrammer of the Year	Argentine Instagrammer of the Year
Amanda Cerny; Ariana Grande; Cameron Dallas; **Camila Cabello**; Lele Pons; Martin Garrix; Selena Gomez	Cande Tinelli; Charlotte Caniggia; Franco Masini; Flor Vigna; Julián Serrano; Lali; Lucas Castel; **Mica Viciconte**
Colombian Instagrammer of the Year	Mexican Instagrammer of the Year
Sebastián Yatra; Anlella Sagra; J Balvin; **Juana Martinez**; Maluma; Mario Ruiz; Sebastian Villalobos	**Danna Paola**; DebRyanShow; Eiza González; Juanpa Zurita; Mario Bautista; Paty Cantú; Poncho Herrera; Werevertumorro
Female Instagrammer of the Year (#Instacrush)	Male Instagrammer of the Year (Perfect Match)
Dhazia Wezka; Esmeralda Pimentel; **Juana Martinez**; Mica Suarez; Mon Laferte; Sofía Reyes; Yosstop	Beto Pasillas; Brandon Peniche; DebRyanShow; Diego Luna; Fede Dosogas; Sebastian Arango; **Sebastian Villalobos**; Sebastián Yatra
Best Athlete on Instagram (Crack on Instagram)	Freshest Face
Canelo Álvarez; Checo Pérez; Chicharito; James Rodríguez; **Lionel Messi**; Neymar; Cristiano Ronaldo	Esau Marujoz; Gieslle Kuri; Jan Carlo Bautista; **Kika Nieto**; La Divaza; Pepe y Teo
Celebrity Challenge	Best YouTube Collaboration (Supercollab)
**CD9**; Cristiano Ronaldo and Portugal national football team; Enchufe TV; Fernanfloo; Los Polinesios; Mario Bautista, Caballeros & Amigos	Alejo Igoa ft. La Divaza and Juan Pablo Jaramillo; Berth Oh ft. Luisito Comunica; **Caeli ft. Yosstop**; Daiana Hernández ft. Los Polinesios; Escorpión Dorado ft. Karla Souza; Lele Pons, Juanpa Zurita and Anwar Jibawi; Juanpa Zurita ft. Julián Serrano y Mario Ruiz
Addiction of the Year	Videogame of the Year
Clash; Facebook; **Instagram Stories**; Musical.ly; Pokémon Go; Snapchat; Super Mario Run	FIFA 17; Halo 5: Guardians; Mario Sports Superstars; Overwatch; Rocket League; The Legend of Zelda: Breath of the Wild
Parody of the Year	Ridiculous of the Year
"Cuatro Babys" – Werevertumorro; "Chantaje en 7 Estilos Musicales" – Palomitas Flow; **"Puro Maquillaje" – Jonatan Clay**; "Ese Gringo" – Werevertumorro ft. Fichis	La La Land and the Oscar; Dvicio and the Grammy for Juan Gabriel; Luna Bella se retracta; Mariah Carey at New Year's Eve; **Justin Bieber's playback in Mexico**; Kanye West meets Donald Trump
Styler of the Year	Pranker of the Year
Whathechicc; **PPMusas**; Pau Tipsc; Marialec	DebRyanShow; Skabeche; Escorpión Dorado; Pláticas Polinesias
