= MTV MIAW Awards =

Latin American music awards (est. 2013)

- Previous: 2024 MTV MIAW Awards
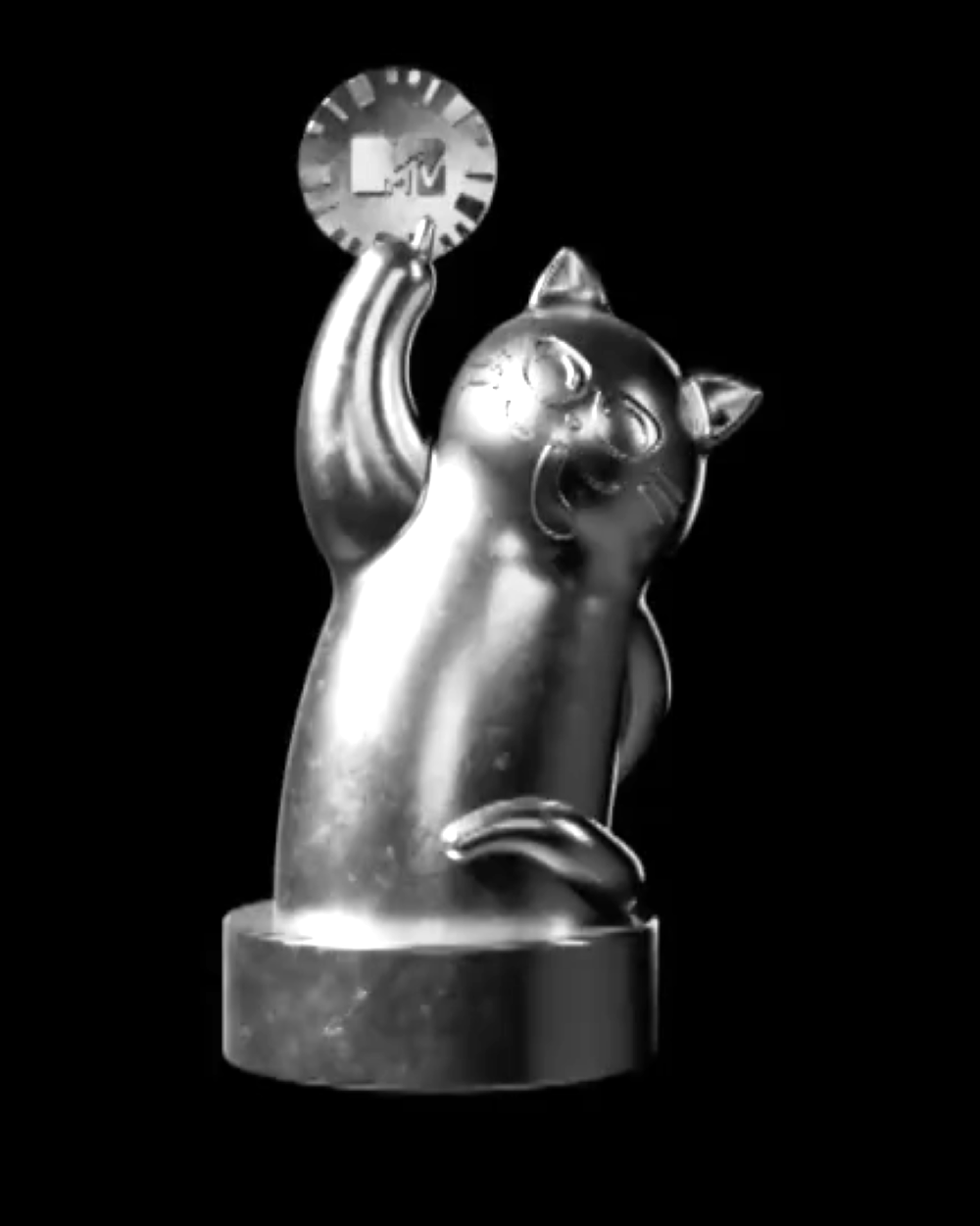
- Trophy of the ceremony since 2013.
- Awarded for: the best of the millennial generation
- Country: Mexico
- Presented by: MTV Latin America
- Formerly called: MTV Millennial Awards
- First award: July 16, 2013; 13 years ago
- Website: miaw.mtvla.com

The MTV MIAW Awards (formerly known as the MTV Millennial Awards) were an annual Latin American award show presented by the Latin American MTV to honor the best of youth internet pop culture and Latin music. Winners receive a cat-shaped statuette, referencing cat memes as a symbol of internet culture.

The ceremony has been held in Mexico City since its inaugural edition on July 16, 2013. The 2020 edition was cancelled due to the COVID-19 pandemic. In February 2025, Bruce Gillmer, of Paramount International Networks, announced an indefinitive pause for several events scheduled for 2025, including the MTV MIAW Awards, as Paramount seeks "to reimagine and optimize [its] events slate going forward".

== List of ceremonies ==
Year	Date	Venue	Host city	Host(s)	Ref.
2013	July 16	Corona Forum	Mexico City	Karla Souza and Werevertumorro	
2014	August 12	Pepsi Center	Mexico City	Eiza González	
2015	June 10	Pepsi Center	Mexico City	Tessa Ia and El Diablito	
2016	June 12	Pepsi Center	Mexico City	Maluma and YosStop	
2017	June 3	Palacio de los Deportes	Mexico City	Lele Pons and Juanpa Zurita	
2018	June 3	Mexico City Arena	Mexico City	La Divaza and Mon Laferte	
2019	June 23	Palacio de los Deportes	Mexico City	Luis Gerardo Méndez and Calle y Poché	
2020	No ceremony held due to the COVID-19 pandemic				
2021	July 13	Quarry Studios	Mexico City	Kali Uchis and Kenia Os	
2022	July 10	Pepsi Center	Mexico City	Becky G and Jimena Jiménez	
2023	August 6	Pepsi Center	Mexico City	Guaynaa and Domelipa	
2024	July 13	Pepsi Center	Mexico City	Young Miko and Ricky Limón	
2025	No ceremony held due to Paramount International Networks pause of several MTV events				

== Award categories ==
=== Current award categories ===
Music

- Video of the Year
- Hit of the Year (awarded as Catchiest Hit of the Year in 2013)
- Best Pop Artist (awarded as Pop Explosion of the Year)
- International Hit of the Year
- Party Anthem
- Best DJ (awarded as Beat Guru)
- Argentine Artist of the Year
- Colombian Artist of the Year
- Mexican Artist of the Year
- Collaboration of the Year

Digital

- MIAW Icon of the Year (awarded as Digitial Icon of the Year until 2016)
- Best New Artist (awarded as The Newest Face)
- Best Worldwide Instagrammer (2014-2015, 2017–present)
- Best Argentine Instagrammer (2013, 2017–present)
- Best Colombian Instagrammer (2013, 2017–present)
- Best Mexican Instagrammer
- Best Performance in an App
- Celebrity Challenge
- Instacrush (awarded as Bizcocho of the Year in 2013 and Sexiest Millennial in 2014)
- Instacrack (2013-2015, 2017–present, awarded as Bombón of the Year in 2013 and Hottest Millennial in 2014)
- Supercolab
- Digital Addiction of the Year
- Ridiculous of the Year (awarded as Epicfail in 2014 and 2015)
- Viral Bomba

Miscellaneous

- Film of the Year
- Series of the Year (2013, 2015–present)
- Videogame of the Year (awarded as Legendary Game; 2013–2014, 2017–present)
- Pranker of the Year
- Perfect Match
- Styler of the Year
- Best Parody
- Lord & Ladies
- Mami Acashore
- Papi Acashore

=== Past award categories ===
- Buzz Artist (2015–2016)
- Gamer Master (2015–2016)
- Best Argentine Snapchatter (2016)
- Best Colombian Snapchatter (2016)
- Best Mexican Snapchatter (2016)
- Twitstar of the Year (2013, 2015; awards for individual regions were created in 2015)
- Viner of the Year (2015)
- Celebrity Dubsmash (2015)
- Couple on Fire (2015)
- Best Latin Instagrammer (2014; awards for individual regions were created in 2015)
- Best Instagrammer (2013; awards for individual regions were created in 2014)
- Argentine Twitstar of the Year (2014)
- Colombian Twitstar of the Year (2014)
- Mexican Twitstar of the Year (2014)
- Best Athlete (2013)
- Social Network of the Year (2013)
- Best Instagrammer (2013)
- Best Fan Army (2013)

== Most wins ==
Artist	Number of awards	Categories
Kenia Os	7	Viral Anthem (2023); MIAW Artist (2023); Best Mexican Artist (2022); Best Fandom (2022); Coreo Crack (2022); MIAW Icon (2021); Instastories (2019)
Lali	7	Argentine + Flame of the Year (2019); Latin Video of the Year (2017); Argentine Artist of the Year (2017); Argentine Artist of the Year (2016); Argentine Instagramer of the Year (2015); Dubsmash Celebrity (2015); Argentine Twittstar of the Year (2014)
Juanpa Zurita	6	Change Agent (2018); Digital Icon of the Year Best (2017); Performance in an App (2016); Mexican Snapchatter of the Year (2016); Viner of the Year (2015); Digital Icon of the Year (2015)
Sebastian Villalobos	5	Instagramer Nivel Dios Colombia (2018); Male Instagrammer of the Year (2017); Instacrack (2016); MIAW Icon of the Year (2015); Colombian Twitstar of the Year (2014)
Mon Laferte	4	Video of the Year (2019); Mexican Artist of the Year (2017); Buzz Artist (2016); Video of the Year (2016)
J Balvin	4	Collaboration of the Year (2018); Hit of the Year (2018); Colombian Artist of the Year (2018); Hit of the Year (2016)
Mario Aguilar	4	Risadictos (2019); Parody (2018); Colombian Snapchatero of the Year (2016); Colombian IInstagrammer of the Year (2015)

== Most nominations ==
Artist	Number of nominations	Categories
Kenia Os	13	Viral Anthem (2023); MIAW Artist (2023); Music Ship of the Year (2023); Best Mexican Artist (2022); Motomami of the Year (2022); Coreo Crack (2022); Best Fandom (2021-2022); MIAW Icon (2021); MIAW Stories (2021); Instastories (2019); Styler of the Year (2018); The Newest Face (2018)
J Balvin	12	Video of the Year (2017); Hit of the Year (2015–2016); Collaboration of the Year (2017); Colombian Artist of the Year (2014–2017); Best Colombian Instagrammer (2015, 2017); Best Colombian Snapchatter (2016); Best Performance in an App (2017)
Maluma	12	Hit of the Year (2016–2017); Colombian Artist of the Year (2014, 2016–2017); Best Latin Instagrammer (2014); Best Colombian Instagrammer (2015, 2017); Best Colombian Snapchatter (2016); Best Performance in an App (2016); Instacrack (2014); Perfect Match (2016)
Lali	11	Video of the Year (2017); Best Pop Artist (2016–2017); Argentine Artist of the Year (2016–2017); Best Argentine Instagrammer (2015; 2017); Dubsmash Celebrity (2015); Best Performance in an App (2016); Argentine Twittstar of the Year (2014); Instacrush (2016)
Juanpa Zurita	8	MIAW Icon of the Year (2015–2017); Viner of the Year (2015); Best Mexican Instagrammer (2017); Mexican Snapchatter of the Year (2016); Best Performance in an App (2016); Supercolab (2017)
Maurio Bautista	8	Best Pop Artist (2016); MIAW Icon of the Year (2015–2016); Buzz Artist (2015); Viner of the Year (2015); Best Mexican Instagrammer (2017); Instacrack (2014); Celebrity Challenge (2017)
Werevertumorro	7	MIAW Icon of the Year (2013–2014, 2016); Best Mexican Instagrammer (2017); Twitstar of the Year (2013); Best Parody (2 in 2017)
Belinda	6	Best Latin Instagrammer (2014); Best Mexican Instagrammer (2015); Twitstar of the Year (2013, 2015); Instacrush (2013–2014)
Dulce Maria	6	Hit of the Year (2015); Best Latin Instagrammer (2014); Best Mexican Instagrammer (2015); Twitstar of the Year (2013); Mexican Twitstar of the Year (2014); Best Fan Army (2013)
Jesse & Joy	6	Hit of the Year (2013, 2016–2017); Collaboration of the Year (2016); Mexican Artist of the Year (2016–2017)
Mon Laferte	6	Video of the Year (2016–2017); Collaboration of the Year (2017); Mexican Artist of the Year (2017); Buzz Artist (2016); Instacrush (2017)
Sebastian Villalobos	6	MIAW Icon of the Year (2016); Best Colombian Instagrammer (2017); Colombian Twittstar of the Year (2014); Best Performance in an App (2017); Instacrack (2015); Perfect March (2017)

== See also ==
- MTV Video Music Awards
- MTV Europe Music Awards
- MTV Movie & TV Awards
- MTV Video Music Brasil
- Los Premios MTV Latinoamérica
- MTV MIAW Awards Brazil
