= Airplane Mode (2019 film) =

2019 American parody film

- The film's poster, which parodies the 1980 film Airplane! and features a plane dabbing.
- Directed by: David Dinetz; Dylan Trussell
- Written by: David Dinetz; Dylan Trussell; Logan Paul; Jake Paul
- Produced by: Andrew Alter; Jeff Levin
- Starring: Logan Paul; Juanpa Zurita; Andrew Bachelor; Amanda Cerny; Nick Bateman; Vitaly Zdorovetskiy; Brittany Furlan; David Dobrik; Casey Neistat; Nick Swardson; Chloe Bridges
- Cinematography: Colt Seman
- Edited by: Mitch Rosin
- Music by: Martin Wilund; 2WEI
- Production company: Culprit Creative
- Distributed by: Gravitas Ventures
- Release dates: February 2019 (Mammoth Film Festival); August 2, 2019
- Running time: 80 minutes
- Country: United States
- Language: English

Airplane Mode is a 2019 American surreal action comedy film directed by David Dinetz and Dylan Trussell, and written by Dinetz, Trussell, Logan Paul and Jake Paul. Logan Paul portrays the main character, a fictionalized version of himself, who is put in a situation where he has to overcome his fear of flying in order to land a plane containing a group of famous social media influencers. Chloe Bridges, Stephen Guarino, Arielle Vandenberg, Kevin Heffernan, Nick Swardson, Mikaela Hoover, Chris Wylde and Erik Griffin have supporting roles in the film, and it was also the final screen credit for Beverly Polcyn, who died 16 days after the film's release, at the age of 90.

== Plot ==
YouTuber Logan Paul is videocalling his Australian girlfriend, Ariel, with whom he has an online relationship. They attempt to have cybersex, but are interrupted first by Logan's foreign exchange brother Juanpa Zurita and then by Lele Pons, who tries to film Logan while he is masturbating. Logan learns about "Hashtagacon," a social media influencer convention in Sydney, where he plans to meet Ariel in person. However, he must confront his fear of flying, triggered ten years earlier by a stunt involving Juanpa.

Logan, Juanpa, and King Bach head to the airport. Andrew informs Logan that prankster Vitaly Zdorovetskiy will be on the same flight, being extradited to Australia for an incident involving dingoes. At immigration, Juanpa is mistaken for an illegal immigrant and is initially deported to Mexico, but persuades officials to send him to Australia instead, hoping to lose his virginity. Logan passes customs smoothly but struggles to board the plane due to his fear of flying. He is calmed by Jenna, a woman seated next to him who shares similar femur scars, and she holds his hand as the plane prepares for takeoff.

Despite pilots' instructions, passengers refuse to switch their phones to airplane mode, which causes electrical interference that electrocutes the pilots. Flight attendant Clarice mistakenly assumes the pilots are engaged in oral sex when she peers into the cockpit. Logan tries to get Jenna's Instagram handle, but she reveals she’s not on social media, although she recognizes him from the "Hashtagacon" group. Logan downplays his influencer status, explaining he is meeting his girlfriend for the first time. Jenna challenges his faith in Ariel, demonstrating humor by making a sleeping passenger snort with laughter, then rests her head on Logan's shoulder.

After hours, Clarice discovers the dead pilots and calls the air marshal to the cockpit, leaving Vitaly alone. Logan overhears the crisis and is shocked to find the pilots dead. Vitaly kills the air marshal by breaking his neck, causing Clarice and Logan to faint. Logan awakens in the cockpit, finds Juanpa incapable of helping, and wakes Jenna to assist him. Jenna panics while Logan attempts to rescue the bound flight attendants held captive by Vitaly in the cargo hold but initially chickens out until Jenna reproaches him. Logan contacts Sydney air traffic controller Benji, who suggests using the autopilot—unusable because Logan had broken the stick in panic. Benji, frustrated, goes on lunch break.

Vitaly searches for the emergency oxygen supply, feeding a dog cat food as a trick before throwing Clarice out of the plane and shouting his catchphrase, "It's just a prank, bro!" He also ejects Andrew, who was distracted filming himself. Nick Bateman, a junior pilot, rallies passengers with a speech but is stabbed by Vitaly upon entering the cockpit.

Logan, who can read the minds of gay people, prevents Jenna from using an oxygen mask laced with chloroform by the male flight attendant Bruce. Logan and Vitaly fight; Vitaly reveals "Hashtagacon" is an elaborate prank and knocks Logan out. Upon regaining consciousness, Logan learns Vitaly has the only parachute and plans to escape by opening the cargo door. Logan and Jenna are saved by Logan’s pet parrot Maverick. Bruce advises using the autopilot; Logan laughs awkwardly because he had broken the control stick.

Vitaly takes control of the plane, but Jenna, despite her hands being tied, passes Logan the autopilot stick, which he throws into Vitaly's chest. Vitaly's parachute deploys, killing him after he is flung into the engine. Logan watches a YouTube instructional video on landing a plane, echoing advice from Benji and Bruce: use the autopilot. Benji calls to mock Logan but instructs him to land straight and hope the plane doesn't explode. The plane lands on the runway but fails to stop, forcing Logan to slam the brakes last minute. The engine explodes as Logan and Jenna nearly kiss.

After evacuation, Logan headbutts Benji in frustration and reunites with Juanpa, who spent the flight drunk and pursuing Brittany Furlan. Logan and Jenna part ways; Logan realizes he has feelings for Jenna, not Ariel. Driving to Ariel’s house, Logan plans to put Juanpa in his place. Ariel quickly realizes Juanpa is not Logan but decides to have sex with him due to his accent. Juanpa is caught by Ariel’s adoptive father, who chases him naked as Juanpa flees by jumping out a window.

Logan visits Jenna’s hotel, assumes she reconciled with her boyfriend Richie, but quickly discerns Richie is gay via his thoughts. Logan kicks Richie out and makes out with Jenna, leading to sex.

In a mid-credits scene, Juanpa runs naked chasing a kangaroo on a beach. Logan kicks down the door of the instructional video creator’s home, knocking out the boy’s sister. Andrew is shown surviving, washing ashore another beach, and making out with a sex doll.

== Cast ==
- Logan Paul as Logan
  - Rocco Piazza as Little Logan
- Juanpa Zurita as Juanpa
  - Liam Ramos as Little Juanpa
- Chloe Bridges as Jenna
- Stephen Guarino as Bruce
- Arielle Vandenberg as Clarice
- Kevin Heffernan as Gary
- Nick Swardson as Esteban
- Mikaela Hoover as Claire
- Lauren Swickard (as Lorynn York) as Ariel
- Hal Alpert as Eugene
- Beverly Polcyn as Old Lady
- Chris Wylde as Co-Pilot Penis/Benji
- Erik Griffin as Co-Pilot Trussell
- Antoine Dodson as Head TSA Agent
- Timothy Brennan as Old TSA Agent
- Casey Neistat as Snoring TSA Agent
- Roman Atwood as Airport Security Guard
- James Frey as Customs Officer/Evil voice of "Jerkins"
- Stacey Scowley as Mrs Marx
- Cassie Brennan as Becky Marx
- Jake Brennan as Connor Marx
- Richard Whiten as Cedric
- James Pulido as Richie

The following social media personalities play fictionalized versions of themselves: Lele Pons, Andrew Bachelor, Brittany Furlan, Jeremy Jahns, Nick Bateman, Jon Paul Piques, Jimmy Carr, Vitaly Zdorovetskiy, Chris Stuckmann, David Dobrik, Alex Wassabi, Anwar Jibawi, Amanda Cerny, Kyle Myers, Lauren Elizabeth, Jerry LaBranche and Paige Ginn.

== Reception ==
Eric D. Snider of Crooked Marquee gave the film a D+, concluding, "We may think that as a society we have done nothing to deserve the image of a lactating Nick Swardson, but we are fooling ourselves. This is who we are."

== Lawsuit ==
Filming for Airplane Mode began in 2016, and it was supposed to be released a year later. However, the film was shelved due to the controversy surrounding Logan Paul and his suicide forest video, and it was eventually released on August 2, 2019 on iTunes. In December 2020, Logan Paul was sued by the production company, Planeless Pictures, for upwards of $3 million after his suicide forest video led to the company's exclusive publishing deal with Google to be suspended. The company alleged that Paul uploaded the suicide forest video in a deliberate attempt to sabotage the film's production, claiming that Paul should have been held responsible for paying back the production company's losses. The lawsuit was settled in May 2024.
