= Nelk =

Entertainment company and YouTube channel

- Occupation: Online entertainment

YouTube information
- Channel: NELK
- Years active: 2010–present
- Genres: Pranks; lifestyle
- Subscribers: 8.43 million
- Views: 1.9 billion
- Last updated: December 7, 2025
- Website: fullsend.com

Nelk (stylized as NELK), also referred to as the Nelk Boys, is a Canadian–American YouTube channel and entertainment company. Known for their prank videos, vlogs, and their brand Full Send Entertainment, they have also begun promoting right-wing political causes. A Canadian outlet has referred to the group's founders, Kyle Forgeard and Jesse Sebastiani, as "two of the most recognizable personalities for young people in North America". They also have a strong following in the Philippines, Israel, and Brazil.

== History ==
In 2010, Kyle Forgeard created the NELK YouTube channel. At the time the channel was called NelkFilmz, along with other founding members Lucas Gasparini, Elliot Slater and Nick Porter. In August 2014, Forgeard met Jesse Sebastiani at an MTV Canada conference, who would soon after become a prominent member of the group. Kyle and Jesse would upload their first YouTube video together titled "YOU LIT ME ON FIRE!!!" on August 26, 2014.

On August 4, 2021, NELK uploaded the first episode of Full Send Podcast with Dana White, exclusive to YouTube and Apple Podcasts. On September 8, 2021, NELK did an audio only exclusive podcast that was not uploaded to YouTube with Jason "905shooter" Pagaduan in Toronto. In February 2022, Forgeard was officially added to the Forbes 30 under 30 list for social media influencers.

In October 2020, members of the group met with President Donald Trump on Air Force One during one of his 2020 presidential election rallies. They were also seen dancing to "Y.M.C.A." with Trump onstage following his rally. They met Trump again in July 2021 at UFC 264, and he appeared on Full Send Podcast in March 2022. The episode went viral, receiving 5 million views in 24 hours, at which time it was removed by YouTube. Following the podcast, Full Send Podcast became the second most popular podcast in the United States on Spotify. Nelk supported Trump's campaign in the 2024 United States presidential election, during which Forgeard spoke at a number of campaign rallies.

On July 8, 2025, Forgeard and Aaron "Steiny" Steinberg of NELK interviewed the prime minister of Israel, Benjamin Netanyahu, on Full Send Podcast, which was then released to the public on July 21. Following the release of the interview with Netanyahu, NELK hosted a discussion about the interview with several influencers, including Sneako, Myron Gaines, Hasan Piker, and Nick Fuentes. The pro-Zionist publication the Times of Israel categorised the commonality between all those influencers as all holding anti-Semitic views. In the days following the Netanyahu interview, Forgeard and Steinberg admitted that they had been supplied with scripted questions from Netanyahu's staff. Amid a wave of backlash from NELK's own fans, Steinberg stated that he regretted not being more critical of Netanyahu during the interview. Specifically, Netanyahu was not asked about the allegations of genocide in the Gaza Strip and West Bank. Steinberg agreed and told fans, "Sure, we're probably not the best at asking questions. We're not the best journalists, we never claimed to be, so we might not be the best at pressing them, but in my opinion, it's up to the viewer to form their own educated opinion".

== Content and brand ==
Nelk's videos, in addition to pranks, are themed around North American college culture. The group's videos combine vlogs of their party lifestyle and travel, as well as footage of their actual pranks. Nelk is known for popularizing and later trademarking the slang term "Full Send" (stylized as FULL SEND) which Forgeard defined as meaning "any activity you do, give it your absolute best". The group has also popularized a number of other terms, including "Rona Season," a reference to the group's constant consumption of Corona beer. Sebastiani has referred to the group's trademark words as "Canadian-influenced slang".

Nelk operates the Full Send clothing brand. The clothing is sold in one-time Supreme-style "drops", where each style of clothing has limited availability and is only available once. Once the entire drop is sold out, no Full Send clothing can be purchased until the next drop, when new styles will become available. Nelk sells almost $100 million worth of apparel every year.

Nelk, along with partners, created a hard seltzer brand in June 2021 called Happy Dad, which is produced and packaged at Minhas Breweries & Distillery in Monroe, Wisconsin. In 2023, Happy Dad became a top five hard seltzer brand at Total Wine according to IRI data. The group also hosts a podcast called Full Send Podcast. Notable guests have included Donald Trump, Mike Tyson, Elon Musk, Andrew Tate, O. J. Simpson, Ben Shapiro, Tucker Carlson, Benjamin Netanyahu and others. The podcast was created in partnership with Shots Podcast Network.

=== Subsidiaries ===
Subsidiary	Type
Full Send	Main brand
NELK	Main YouTube channel
SalimtheDream	YouTube channel
SteveWillDoIt	Rumble channel
Full Send Podcast	Podcast and YouTube channel
Full Send Golf	YouTube channel
Full Send MMA	YouTube channel
FullSend.com	Merchandise and exclusive content website
Happy Dad	Hard seltzer brand
Full Send Supplements	Health and Fitness Supplement brand
Full Send Metacard	NFT
The Dream Squad	Instagram brand
Girls Love Artists	Merchandise

==== YouTube channels ====
YouTube Channel	Subscriber Count
NELK	8,400,000
Full Send Podcast	2,170,000
SalimTheDream	876,000
Full Send Podcast Clips	538,000
Full Send MMA	452,000
Full Send Golf	338,000
Nelk 2	294,000
One Night With Steiny	160,000
Happy Dad	126,000
Full Send Metacard	27,300

==== Rumble channels ====
Rumble Channel	Subscriber Count
SteveWillDoIt	1,643,000

==== Most-viewed podcasts ====
Guest	Views
Elon Musk	22,965,789
Mike Tyson	13,162,205
Donald Trump	8,853,336

== Members ==
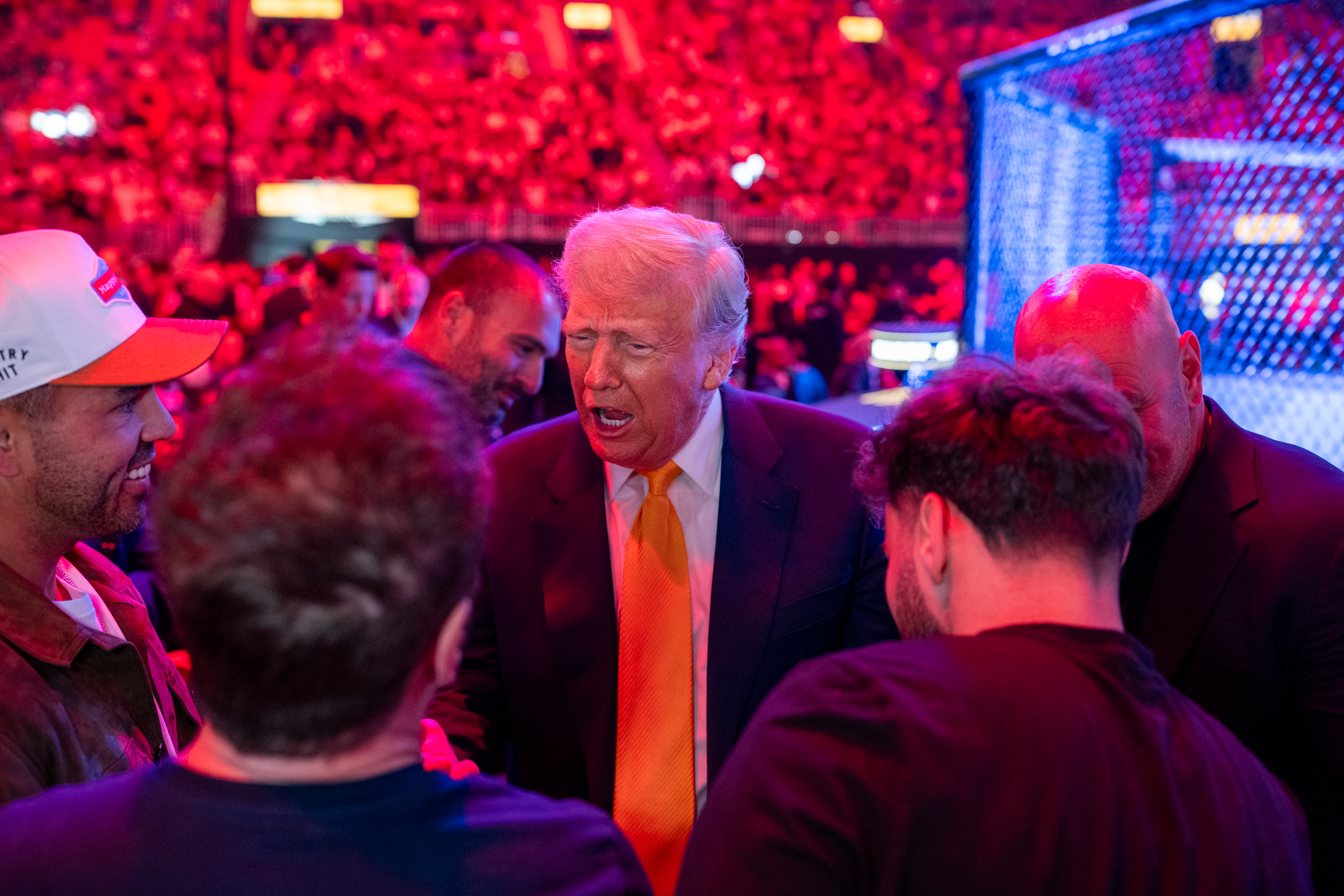
Forgeard (left) speaking to President Donald Trump at UFC 314

Current and recurring members include Kyle Forgeard, Stephen "SteveWillDoIt" Deleonardis, Salim Sirur, Gabriel Poncio, Aaron "Steiny" Steinberg, "Jimmy Gambles" (Arthur Kulik), Jason "905shooter" Pagaduan and "Cousin Jay" (Jordan Nwanne). Happy Dad Headquarters is located in Newport Beach, California. NELK relocated to Miami, Florida, from Orange County, California. The group previously resided in Ontario and Los Angeles.

Jesse Sebastiani was a founding member of the group. Prior to joining NELK, was known for his self-published documentary, Saved by the Status, and his role in the MTV show Careless Teens. Years after joining, he expressed his displeasure with his and the group's lifestyle. In a tweet posted on January 29, 2020, he wrote, "I hate fame... I've lost almost everything I use to love about life." He eventually became less active in Nelk videos, and in late 2020, he began primarily working on the Full Send brand. In 2022, he officially took distance from the group, bought out of the company, and started his own brand called "Sunday".

Other former members of the group include Niko and Marko Martinovic, Lucas Gasparini, and Jason Pagaduan. The Martinovic twins were members of NELK in the early development. On July 20, 2014, NELK would upload their first YouTube video with the twins titled "Fake House Party Prank on Mom!!". The Martinovic twins later left the group sometime in 2015 to pursue YouTube independently. Gasparini left in February 2017 citing concerns of his association with the channel's content, which consisted of public misconduct which would affect his career outlook, as well as the pursuit of educational studies as a plumber. Lucas then returned in 2021 joining the rest of the team in Los Angeles before leaving the group again in 2022 after speculation regarding a gambling scam scandal. Pagaduan, who was known by his Instagram handle "905shooter" or simply "9-0," joined NELK in September 2017. Pagaduan was withdrawn from the group in October 2019 for behavioural misconduct from sexual harassment allegations stemming from him sending direct messages of a graphic and sexual nature to fans, as well as not meeting standards. Pagaduan has since returned to the channel and resumed a minor role in videos as well as coordinating photography and video with the team. Pagaduan's first appearance back on the NELK YouTube channel since leaving was in a YouTube video titled "Confronting old NELK members" on August 28, 2023.

=== Nelk Boys ===
Member	Hometown	Role
Kyle Forgeard	Mississauga, Ontario, Canada	Nelk Co-Founder and Owner; Co-Host of Full Send Podcast
Jason "905shooter" Pagaduan	Mississauga, Ontario, Canada	Member, Photographer and Videographer
Stephen "SteveWillDoIt" Deleonardis	Oviedo, Florida	Member; CEO of SteveWillDoIt LLC
Salim "Salim the Dream" Sirur	San Jose, California	Member; CEO of SalimTheDream
Aaron "Steiny" Steinberg	Denver, Colorado	Co-Host of Full Send Podcast
Sean Haney	Thousand Oaks, California	Videographer and Editor
Arthur "Jimmy Gambles" Kulik	Mississauga, Ontario, Canada	Content Creator

=== Crew ===
Member	Hometown	Role
Gabriel Poncio	Almores, Brazil	Executive Assistant
Jordan "Cousin Jay" Nwanne	Sacramento, California	Content Creator

==== Former ====
Member	Hometown	Role
Jesse Sebastiani	Orangeville, Ontario, Canada	Nelk Co-Founder
Lucas Gasparini	Mississauga, Ontario, Canada	Content Creator
Niko Martinovic	Erin, Ontario, Canada	Content Creator
Marko Martinovic	Erin, Ontario, Canada	Content Creator

=== Corporate ===
Member	Hometown	Role
Kyle Forgeard	Mississauga, Ontario, Canada	Owner
John Shahidi	Orange County, California	President of all Ventures
Sam Shahidi	Orange County, California	CEO of Happy Dad Hard Seltzer
Austin "AusGod" Ermes	Oshawa, Ontario, Canada	Director of Content/Lead Editor
Drew Hill	Toronto, Ontario, Canada	Nelk Manager

=== Full Send Podcast ===
Member	Hometown	Role
Kyle Forgeard	Mississauga, Ontario, Canada	Lead Podcast Host
Aaron "Steiny" Steinberg	Denver, Colorado	Podcast Host
Salim Sirur	Sacramento, California	Occasional Podcast Host
Gabriel Poncio	Almores, Brazil	Producer and Portuguese Translator

=== Dream Squad ===
Member	Hometown	Role
Salim Sirur	Sacramento, California	Chief Executive Officer
Jordan "Cousin Jay" Nwanne	Sacramento, California	Lead Videographer; CEO of Girls Love Artists
Nick Nayersina	Chicago, Illinois	Content Creator
Tyler Chafee	San Jose, California	Bird Coordinator
Jason Mejia	Los Angeles, California	Editor

=== Full Send MMA ===
Member	Hometown	Role
Shawny "The OG" Mack	Las Vegas, Nevada	Head Reporter
Sean "Suga Sean" O'Malley	Phoenix, Arizona	Ambassador
Dana White	Las Vegas, Nevada	Honorary Nelk BigBoy

== Legal issues and controversies ==
Throughout Nelk's career, they have been the subject of various legal issues and controversies. In January 2015, Nelk posted a video titled "Coke Prank On Cops" in which they told police officers in Los Angeles that they had "coke" in the back of the car, leading the officers to think that they were referring to cocaine, when in actuality, they were referring to Coca-Cola. The group received a warning, and the Los Angeles Police Department released a statement informing the public that the prank was illegal and warning potential copycat pranksters against doing so. The video has received 49 million views and is currently their most viewed, having almost three times as many views as their second-most viewed video. It is also notably regarded as the video that sparked their global popularity.

In January 2019, Sebastiani was arrested during a prank in which he walked into a Barnes & Noble store with fake blood smeared on a white jumpsuit and asked workers for books on covering up a crime scene. He was charged by Columbus, Ohio, police department, and found guilty of disorderly conduct in the Ohio Court of Common Pleas. In August 2019, Nelk participated in a "spin the globe challenge", and ended up in Europe. In Ireland, Nelk planned a meetup in a public park, but failed to notify the local police. The meetup got out of control, with large mobs of fans swarming the area in an unsafe manner, causing the meetup to be cut short. In May 2020, Forgeard, Deleonardis and Sirur, along with several other members, were arrested for disturbing the peace while filming a prank at a Target store in Mississippi. They were later released on bond.

In September 2020, the police department in Normal, Illinois, announced an investigation into Nelk after they hosted a flash mob of about 200 people on-campus at Illinois State University in violation of COVID-19 regulations. Following this, YouTube announced a decision to totally demonetize the Nelk YouTube account in addition to most of their specific videos, so that no money could be earned from YouTube. They attributed the decision to the platform's Creator Responsibility Policy, which mandates that creators do not engage in "on- and/or off-platform behavior [that] harms our users, community, employees or ecosystem", claiming that Nelk had harmed YouTube users by hosting a group of people and thereby violating COVID-19 regulations. Chris Koos, the town's mayor, also stated that he intended to pursue legal action against Nelk. A week later, police in Seaside Heights, New Jersey, broke up a gathering of about 1,500 people at a house being rented by Nelk, which violated New Jersey's COVID-19 restrictions. Nelk, despite no intentions to draw a crowd, was eventually kicked out of the house by the landlord and 8 fans were arrested. Governor Phil Murphy called the event "knucklehead behavior".

On March 23, 2021, Nelk was unable to upload a video due to suggestions by their attorney in relation to an arrest warrant filed against Forgeard in Texas. That same month, CBS reported that Nelk was responsible for a series of physical assaults at a group meet in Fort Worth, Texas, on March 15, 2021.

In July 2025, the official Nelk Boys channel uploaded an interview with Israeli Prime Minister Benjamin Netanyahu. The interview drew widespread controversy due to the ongoing Gaza War, in which 64,000 children have been killed or injured, with international organizations labelling the ongoing Israeli actions against Palestinians as genocide. Instead of asking questions about the ongoing conflict, claims of genocide, and current political unrest in Israel as a result, the interviewers asked Netanyahu whether he prefers Burger King or McDonald’s.

== Awards and nominations ==
=== Streamy Awards ===
The YouTube Streamy Awards, or commonly referred to as the Streamy's, are presented annually to recognize and honor excellence in online video, including directing, acting, producing, and writing.

Year	Category	Nominated work	Result	Ref(s)
2021	Creator Product	Happy Dad Hard Seltzer	Won	
