= Shots Podcast Network =

Podcast network company

SHOTS
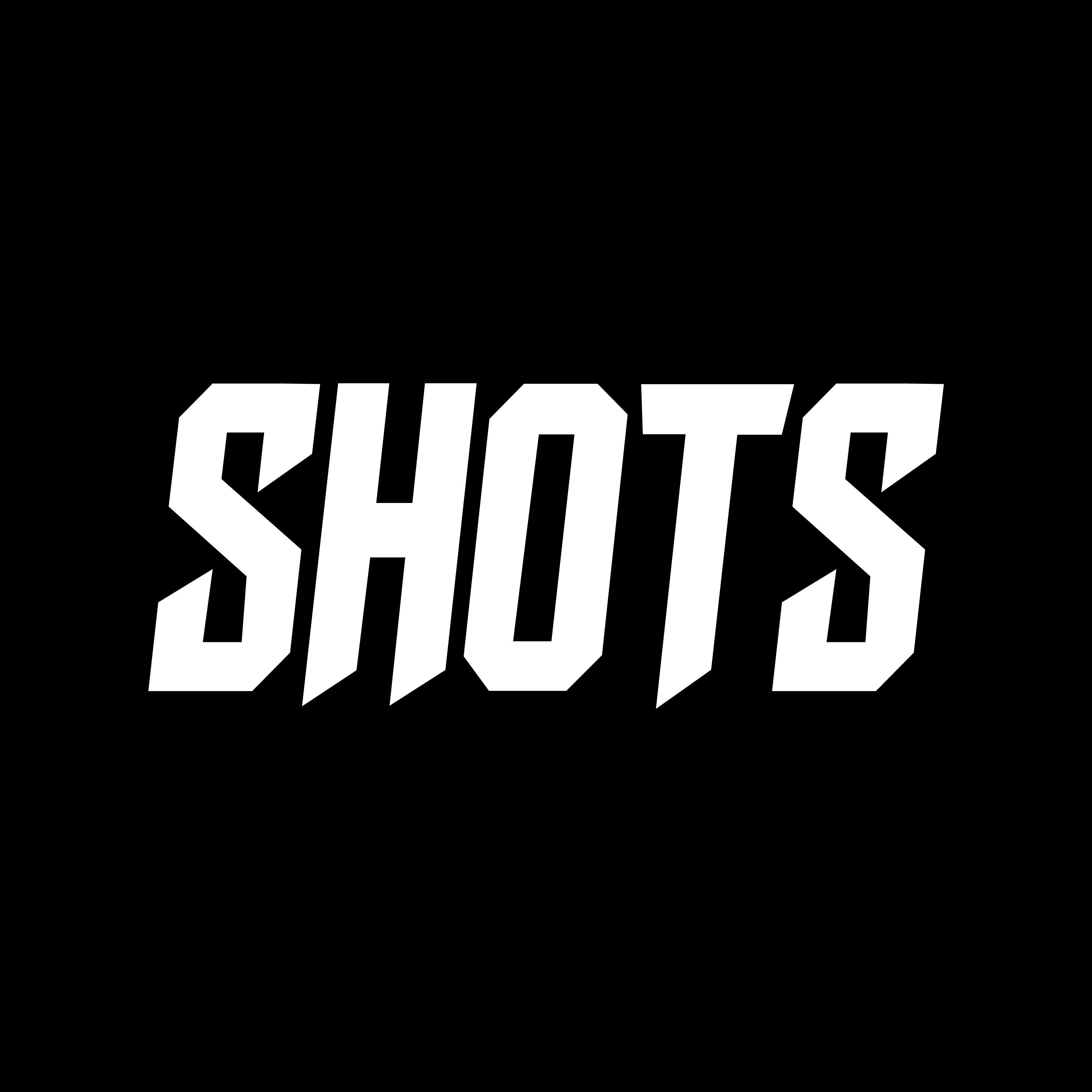
- Formerly: Rock Software, Inc. (2009-2011); RockLive, Inc. (2011-2013); Shots Studios (2013–2020); Shots Podcast Network, Inc. (2020–2025); SHOTS (2025–Present
- Type: Private
- Industry: Multimedia
- Founded: January 4, 2008; 18 years ago
- Founders: John Shahidi; Sam Shahidi
- Headquarters: Costa Mesa, California, U.S.
- Key people: John Shahidi; Sam Shahidi; Justin Bieber; Nelk Boys
- Website: shots.com

SHOTS is a media company founded in 2008 by brothers John and Sam Shahidi.

The company was originally founded as a software development company named Rock Software in 2009, creating mobile games along with YouTube channels with celebrities. The first iPhone game and YouTube channel was created in partnership with Mike Tyson.

With the support of a team of investors including Justin Bieber, podcasts under the Shots Podcast Network include Full Send Podcast, The Pivot and Hotboxin with Mike Tyson.

== Podcast Network and YouTube ==
In November 2019, Spotify announced a suite of podcasts and included a partnership with Shots Podcast Network for a podcast hosted by Lele Pons. "Best Kept Secrets with Lele Pons" debuted exclusively on Spotify on August 19, 2020.

In 2020, Shots released 2 podcasts, I Am Athlete with Brandon Marshall and Hotboxin with Mike Tyson.

In 2021, Shots released Full Send Podcast with the Nelk Boys.

In 2022, after parting ways with I Am Athlete, Shots released The Pivot Podcast.

== Shots & Consumer Goods ==
Shots Podcast Network has expanded to consumer goods and merchandise.

In August 2020, Shots became a retailer of NRG Esports merchandise after forming a partnership with the gaming company.

On April 3, 2020, WWD announced a partnership between Shots Podcast Network and Syllable, a beauty product company, to create Loops Beauty, a line of sustainable face masks. Shots Studios creators model and promote the product.

In June 2021, Shots helped launch Happy Dad Hard Seltzer with the Nelk Boys.

== Company History ==
=== Rock Software: 2009 - 2011 ===
The company launched as Rock Software in 2009 by brothers John and Sam Shahidi in Southern California. They started as a mobile gaming company focused on iOS and Android apps, with its first commercial release being RunPee, an app which gives users the best time to use the restroom during a movie. The app was featured on The Today Show. Through a mutual friend on the Cincinnati Bengals, the Shahidi brothers met star wide receiver Chad Ochocinco which led to a partnership and creation of two apps, the Chad Ochocinco Experience and MadChad.

=== RockLive: 2011 - 2013 ===
During this time the company continued to grow and rebranded as RockLive. They expanded their focus on mobile gaming apps and created apps for celebrities and athletes including Mike Tyson, Usain Bolt, and Cristiano Ronaldo. In 2011, the company launched a mobile game called Mike Tyson's Main Event. Across their various platforms, RockLive saw more than 3 million active users.

=== Shots App: 2013 - 2017 ===
In 2013 the company began moving away from mobile games and working on a new social media app. With a large investment from Justin Bieber earlier that year, they released the Shots app on November 12, 2013. The app was a selfie picture sharing app with a focus on anti-bullying. Other investors include Floyd Mayweather, King Bach, Marlon Wayans, Omar Epps, Shervin Pishevar, Ben Parr, WI Harper, Upfront Ventures and DCM Ventures. This led to the move of the company headquarters to San Francisco.

After Twitter CEO Anthony Noto accidentally tweeted a message about an acquisition for Twitter, a source close to the company confirmed that Twitter was looking to acquire Shots for $150 million. CEO John Shahidi stated to Fox News that the company was not for sale at the time.

By 2015 the Shots app had over 7 million active users. During this time, the company began partnering with digital content creators including Rudy Mancuso to explore delivering original content to its users. This led to the development of the Awkward Puppets series.

In 2017, the Shots mobile app was removed from the App Store as the company shifted focus towards producing original content for YouTube and other social platforms.

=== Shots Studios: 2013 - 2020 ===
The Shots app launched Shots Studios and became a full-time digital studio in 2016. After the companies transition to digital entertainment, the Shots app was removed from the App Store (iOS) in 2016.

Shots Studios channels have tens of millions of followers combined, tapping into an increasingly digital world with online comedy, music, and other video content. The company has landed partnerships with companies such as Netflix, Google, and many Fortune 500 brands for branded content.

In addition to its core YouTube channels, Shots Studios has since launched a music division, a kid-friendly "edutainment" channel, an apparel line, and beauty products.

Shots Studios creators have partnered with companies such as Google, Target, Tarte Cosmetics, AXE, EA Sports, Budweiser, COVERGIRL, and many others to produce branded content.

In October 2015, Shots Studios launched Awkward Puppets, an original series created by Rudy Mancuso, thus launching the recently re-branded company's first foray into content production.

In 2016, Shots Studios partnered with Mike Tyson to launch a YouTube channel for the boxer to share sketch comedy on. The company began to manage other creators, assembling a roster of Rudy Mancuso, Lele Pons, Anwar Jibawi, Hannah Stocking and Jake Paul, in order to produce content on their own YouTube channels.

Shots Studios previously partnered and collaborated with other entertainers such as Alesso, Anitta, Marlon Wayans, Mike Tyson, Inanna Sarkis, and Loren Gray.

In July 2017, Shots Studios signed Brazilian megastar Anitta.

On September 3, Anitta released her first English-language single, a collaboration with Grammy Award-winning producer and songwriter Poo Bear titled "Will I See You." The video earned over 10 million views in its first two days on YouTube.

On October 7, 2017, Mancuso released his first single titled “Black & White” with Poo Bear.

On November 19, 2017, Anitta released "Downtown," a Spanish-language collaboration with Colombian singer J Balvin. The song was nominated for "Best Urban Song" at the Latin GRAMMYs.

Shots Studios also produced music videos for Grammy Award nominated Swedish producer Alesso, including the visuals for 2017's “Is That For Me” with Brazilian star Anitta, 2018's Mancuso-directed “Remedy” with Conor Maynard, and 2019's “Sad Song” with Tini. In September 2017, Alesso and American artist Hailee Steinfeld released "Let Me Go" featuring Florida Georgia Line and Watt. The record was certified Platinum and amassed over 1 billion streams across streaming platforms.

In July 2018, Variety announced that Shots Studios partnered with Netflix to produce a six-episode docuseries that followed the life of Brazilian pop star Anitta. The series, titled Vai Anitta, was exclusively released on Netflix on November 16, 2018.

In March 2018, Billboard named Shots Studios one of Dance music's "Internationalists," a company that is "leading dance music's global expansion." John and Sam Shahidi were named to Billboard's Latin Power Players list for their and their artists' success in the Spanish-speaking market in November 2018.

In late November 2018, Alesso released "Tilted Towers," a collaborative project with Fortnite streamer and YouTuber Ninja, which debuted live on the gamer's Twitch stream. The song appeared on Ninja's first music endeavor, a compilation project titled "Ninjawerks (Vol. 1).

In August 2018, Shots Studios Music was formed in partnership with Universal Music Group and Lele Pons released her first solo single, “Celoso.” Pons would perform the record at the Latin American Music Awards after it was certified 3× Platinum.

On March 13, 2019, Tubefilter announced that Shots Studios would join a handful of other creative studios and content creators to produce new original programming for Facebook Watch. Shots Studios’ slate of programs was headlined by projects from Rudy Mancuso, Juanpa Zurita and Lele Pons.

On June 12, 2019, Shots Studios released a series of Mancuso-written and directed shorts titled "Stories From Our Future" in collaboration with Netflix's Emmy Award winning series Black Mirror.

On August 14, 2020, it was announced that social media superstar Jake Paul signed with Shots Studios.

On April 22, 2020, Variety announced Shots Studios’ YouTube Original docuseries titled The Secret Life of Lele Pons. The first episode of the five-part docuseries premiered on May 19, 2020, on Lele Pons’ YouTube channel.

On August 24, Tubefilter announced that Shots Studios had entered a new partnership with NRG Esports for content production, social strategy, and apparel.
