= Música (2024 film) =

2024 film by Rudy Mancuso

- Release poster
- Directed by: Rudy Mancuso
- Written by: Rudy Mancuso; Dan Lagana
- Produced by: McG; Mary Viola
- Starring: Rudy Mancuso; Camila Mendes; J.B. Smoove
- Cinematography: Shane Hurlbut
- Edited by: Melissa Kent
- Music by: Rudy Mancuso
- Production companies: Amazon MGM Studios; Wonderland Sound and Vision; Big Indie Pictures; Shots Studios
- Distributed by: Amazon Prime Video
- Release dates: March 14, 2024 (SXSW); April 4, 2024 (Prime Video)
- Running time: 91 minutes
- Country: United States
- Languages: English; Portuguese

Música (transl. Music) is a 2024 American coming-of-age romantic comedy film starring and directed by Rudy Mancuso in his feature film directorial debut. Mancuso also co-wrote the screenplay with Dan Lagana and composed the film’s original soundtrack. Camila Mendes and J.B. Smoove co-star.

Música had its world premiere at South by Southwest on March 14, 2024, and was released by Amazon Prime Video on April 4, 2024. It is based in part on Mancuso's personal experience.

== Plot ==
Rudy is a young man plagued by synesthesia in his head. He gets distracted from his relationships and studies due to symphony of everyday sounds and noises.

He struggles to balance his artistic pursuits, like puppetry and music, with the expectations of his mother Maria to embrace his Brazilian heritage in Newark, New Jersey and find a more stable career path.

When Rudy's long-term girlfriend breaks up with him, his mother sets him up with other Brazilian women. However, Rudy ends up meeting and falling for Isabella, a fellow Brazilian American who understands and values his synesthetic experience.

The film follows Rudy as he navigates through a love triangle, seeking a balance between his artistic dreams and his commitment to his family and cultural heritage.

== Cast ==
- Rudy Mancuso as Rudy
- Camila Mendes as Isabella
- Francesca Reale as Haley
- J.B. Smoove as Anwar
- Maria Mancuso as Maria
- Gabriela Amerth as Jill
- Andy Grotelueschen as Professor
- Camila Senna as Luana
- Regina Schneider as Claire Dombeck

Additionally, Andy Muschietti appears as a Subway Busker.

== Production ==
In April 2022, it was announced that a romantic comedy film written and directed by Rudy Mancuso titled Música was in development, with Mancuso, Camila Mendes, J.B. Smoove, Francesca Reale, and Maria Mancuso rounding out the cast. The film was a semi-autobiographical based on Mancuso's own experiences of being plagued by synesthesia where he would perceive everyday sounds as rhythmic musical patterns in his head, where the film "takes place at a time when Rudy does not know how to tune it out".

Mancuso had the idea of Música for 10 years as he envisioned to make a film based on his experiences on how he sees and hears things being different from the normal people, who never experience that, and this idea remained consistent as Mancuso explored these themes through short-form content on Vine and YouTube during his college days. His experience as a content creator thereby laid the foundation for Música as he adopted a self-sufficient guerilla makeshift production of filmmaking utilzing practical effects and editing styles through Vine. Mancuso also composed the music even before they began shooting as he wanted how the film to sound as intended.

Mancuso shot the film in real-life locations at New Jersey in his childhood to maintain the authenticity of a semi-autobiography. Some of the portions were filmed at Mancuso's childhood home in Glen Ridge, and several locations in The Ironbound of Newark served as the principal location, as it represented the Brazilian–American community where he grew up. These included the Brasilla Grill, Opa Fish Market and other local parks and streets in this vicinity. Other principal locations included Hoboken, Clifton, Harrison, and Rutgers University. For a sequence to be shot in a single take, Mancuso utilized a live theatrical approach were sets and backdrops move out of frame in real time over montage cuts and editing. This scene was shot at a warehouse stage in New Jersey, where the actors required half a day of rehearsal and half a day of shooting, taking over 14 days.

Mancuso avoided studio overdubs and instead went ahead with practical rhythmic sounds being created by the actors and environment during the actual takes. Though filming was completed, the editing process took several months to ensure each frame were in sync with the music. The ending was left to be ambiguous as Mancuso said he was allergic to "buttoned-up endings" and knew in his earlier scripts that his character would not get the girl, as he was dealing with the self-perpetuated obstacles and lies to himself while trying to figure what he wants, and he did not want the character to end up with the girl as he felt it not authentic to his actual experience.

== Release ==
Música had its world premiere at South by Southwest on March 13, 2024. It was released in the United States on April 4, 2024 through Amazon Prime Video.

== Reception ==
On the review aggregator website Rotten Tomatoes, 96% of 48 critics' reviews are positive, with an average rating of 7.8/10. The website's consensus reads: "Rudy Mancuso's use of magical realism elevates Música, infusing its familiar narrative framework with a bracingly personal touch." Metacritic, which uses a weighted average, assigned the film a score of 74 out of 100, based on 7 critics, indicating "generally favorable" reviews.

Amy Nicholson of The New York Times added that "the film also honors small acts of ingenuity, including song fragments that quit after a stanza" though the ending was bit incomplete, "perhaps that fits a young talent bubbling over with so much invention that he can’t predict what’s next." Lovia Gyarkye of The Hollywood Reporter wrote "aesthetic flourishes are thrilling [...] but they can sometimes feel like pageantry to mask an often too thin narrative" as she felt the screenplay "struggles to maintain the same charm as the visuals." Monica Castillo of RogerEbert.com added that the film explores Mancuso's connection to the Brazilian culture more than the romantic plot, thereby providing a unique experience on screen. Carlos Aguilar of Variety noted that despite being saccharine in places, the film boasts "'anything goes' spirit that makes it easier to forgive those more formulaic bits".

Rafael Motamayor of IndieWire wrote "Música heralds the arrival of a filmmaker, an actor, and a musician worth paying attention to, while also delivering a winning and visually inventive musical comedy." Nadira Goffe of Slate said, "Música stomps its way into some cheesy pitfalls, but it’s also an unusually refreshing rom-com." Ashley Hajimirsadeghi of MovieWeb described it as "a lot of fun to watch, making it a unique and necessary addition to the romantic comedy genre that feels fitting for this day and age". Ferdosa Abdi of Screen Rant wrote "From its compelling topic choice, a star-making lead role, stellar ensemble cast, and crafty execution, Música is a must-see." Laura Bradley of The Daily Beast said "The film frequently makes music out of Rudy’s surroundings, a compelling trick that gives the film its irrepressible rhythm".

== Accolades ==
Awards	Date of ceremony	Category	Recipient(s) and nominee(s)	Result	Ref.
ADG Excellence in Production Design Awards	February 15, 2025	Excellence in Production Design for a Television Movie	Neslihan Arslan (set designer), Ann Calhoun (art director), Jeff Errico (storyboard artist), Keri Lederman (set decorator), Gonzalo Cordoba (art director), Patrick M. Sullivan Jr. (production designer) and Eva Imber (graphic designer)	Nominated	
Astra TV Awards	December 8, 2024	Best Television Movie	Música	Nominated	
Critics' Choice Awards	February 7, 2025	Best Movie Made for Television	Música	Nominated	
Hollywood Professional Association	November 7, 2024	Outstanding Sound – Theatrical Feature	Christopher S. Aud, Aaron Glascock, Eliza Pollack Zebert, Mitch Osias, Rob Young and Jennifer Barak	Nominated	
Imagen Awards	September 8, 2024	Best Special or TV Movie	Música	Won	
Imagen Awards	September 8, 2024	Best Actor – Drama (Television)	Rudy Mancuso	Nominated	
Imagen Awards	September 8, 2024	Best Actress – Drama (Television)	Camila Mendes	Nominated	
Imagen Awards	September 8, 2024	Best Director – Drama (Television)	Rudy Mancuso	Nominated	
Imagen Awards	September 8, 2024	Best Music Composition for Film or Television	Rudy Mancuso	Nominated	
Motion Picture Sound Editors	February 23, 2025	Outstanding Achievement in Sound Editing – Non-Theatrical Feature	Christopher Aud (supervising sound editor), Mitch Osias (sound effects editor), Eliza Pollack-Chalfant Zebert (supervising adr editor), Alyson Dee Moore, Christopher Moriana and Nancy Parker (foley artists)	Nominated	
NAACP Image Awards	February 22, 2025	Outstanding Writing in a Television Movie, Documentary or a Special	Rudy Mancuso and Dan Lagana	Nominated	
