= Lele Pons =

Venezuelan–American YouTuber (born 1996)

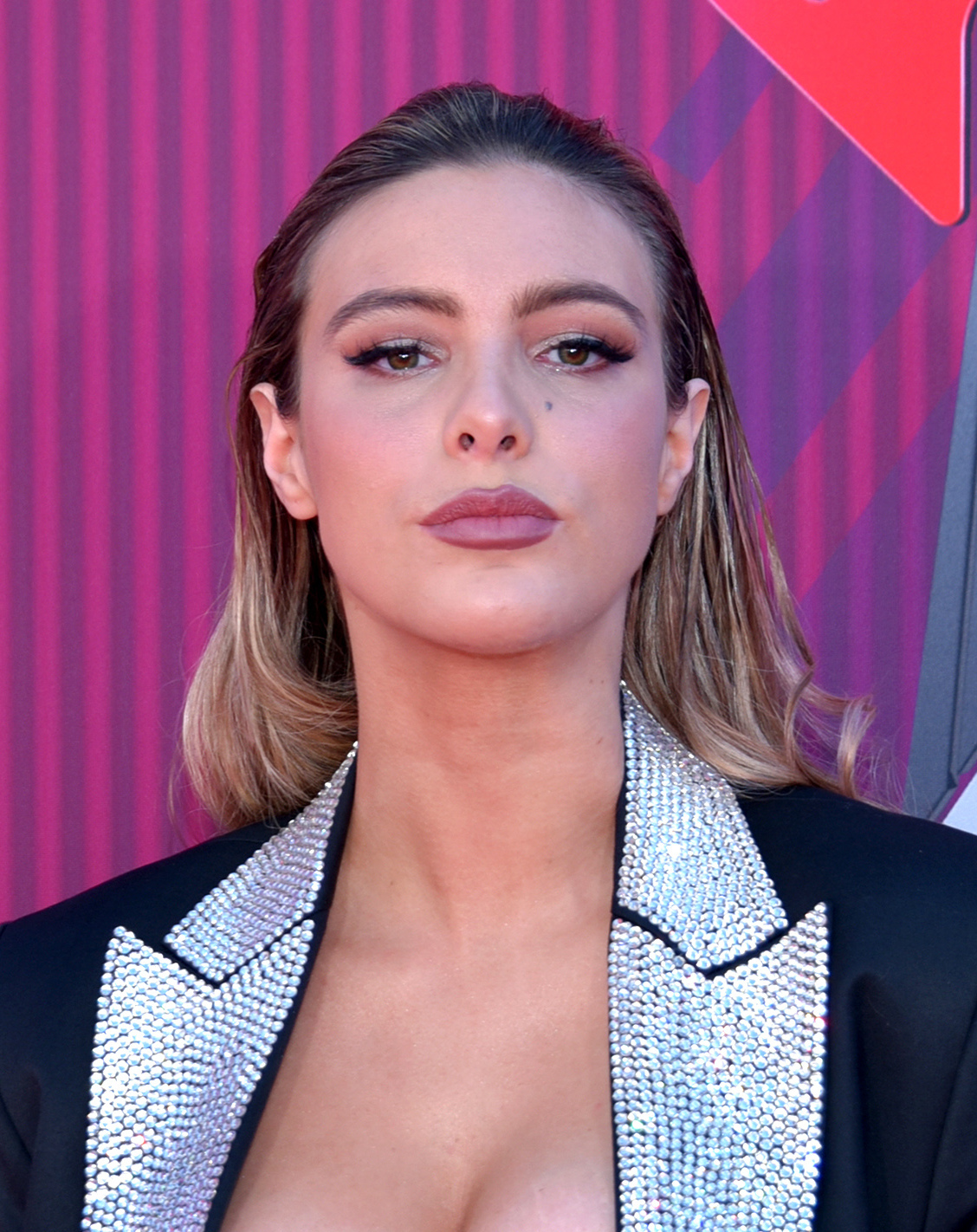
- Pons in 2019
- Born: Eleonora Pons Maronese; 25 June 1996 (age 30); Caracas, Republic of Venezuela
- Citizenship: Venezuela; United States
- Occupations: YouTuber; actress; singer
- Years active: 2013–present
- Spouse: Guaynaa (m. 2023)
- Children: 1
- Relatives: Chayanne (uncle by marriage)

YouTube information
- Channel: LelePons
- Years active: 2013–present
- Genres: Comedy; pranks; music; vlogs
- Subscribers: 17.9 million
- Views: 5.66 billion
- Last updated: April 25, 2026

Eleonora "Lele" Pons Maronese (/ˈlɛleɪ/ LEL-ay; born June 25, 1996) is a Venezuelan and American YouTuber, actress, and singer. She came to prominence on Vine before the platform was shut down in 2016 where she was the most followed woman and the third most followed Viner with 11.5 million followers. She then expanded into creating comedy sketches for YouTube, where she has over 17 million subscribers as of September 2026.

Pons has since acted in film, television, and music videos; released her own music; and co-authored a novel. In 2020, she starred in The Secret Life of Lele Pons, a YouTube Original docuseries providing a look at her personal life, and began hosting a podcast on Spotify called Best Kept Secrets with Lele Pons.

== Early life ==
Eleonora Pons Maronese was born in Caracas, the daughter of pediatrician Anna Maronese Pivetta and architect Luis Guillermo Pons Mendoza. When she was a child, her parents separated after her father realized that he was gay. She is of Spanish and Italian descent, and is the niece of Puerto Rican singer Chayanne. She moved to the U.S. at the age of five and was raised in Miami. She graduated from Miami Country Day School in 2015 and moved to Los Angeles. She has said that she had trouble making friends in high school and would thus "get hurt to make them laugh". She has also described being bullied in high school: "I'm not like the cool girls—I'm the other girl. The one that's basically a nerd, but proud of that."

== Career ==
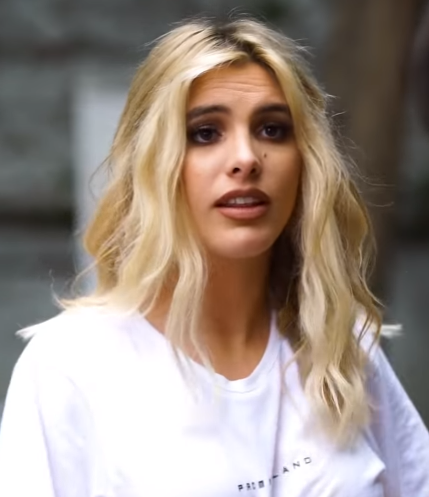
Pons in 2017

Pons began her career on the video platform Vine. She has said she used Vine to showcase the creative things she was already doing. Speaking to Teen Vogue, Pons said, "I started with my friends, and I started becoming bad. At first it was just being really creative - it wasn't even funny stuff." Her follower base continued to grow and Pons has said that it "got to the point where a lot of people depended on me to make them... just so they could get a laugh." She became the first "Viner" to reach one billion loops. Among her collaborators are Inanna Sarkis, Rudy Mancuso, Anwar Jibawi and Hannah Stocking

Writing in The Cut, Allie Jones described Pons' comedy as "universal, physical, and complete with a twist ending". Pons' comedic style has also been criticised. For instance, former Viner, Cody Ko, critically viewed one her sketches, saying, "This was written by a four-year-old." Pons cites, among her inspirations, several Latin American female stars such as Sofía Vergara, Gaby Espino, and Shakira. In 2016, she was signed with entertainment company Shots Studios.

Pons has used her success in Internet comedy to launch a number of enterprises. In 2015, she launched a jewelry collection called UNO Magnetic. In 2016, Pons co-authored a novel based on her own high school experiences, Surviving High School, co-authored with Melissa de la Cruz. Pons starred as Callie in the 2016 romantic comedy We Love You, released on YouTube Red. In the movie, characters played by Yousef Erakat and Justin Dobies both fall for Pons, who is "cool enough" to date both of them at the same time. The movie was produced by YouTube and AwesomenessTV.

Pons appeared in the first episode of MTV's horror TV series, Scream, in which she was the season's first victim of Ghostface. She has starred in a number of music videos, including "Havana" by Camila Cabello, and "Downtown" by Anitta and J Balvin. In May 2018, Pons released her debut single, a Spanish-language duet with Matt Hunter titled "Dicen". The YouTube music video amassed 10 million views in just four days. Pons has also had success in modelling.

In February 2017, she became a brand ambassador for CoverGirl. The same month, Pons walked in a Dolce & Gabbana show in Milan. Babe criticised the move as seeming "a bit hackneyed and past-it". In August, Pons released her first single and music video for her song "Celoso", which was directed by fellow creator Rudy Mancuso. The song was certified 10× Diamond and earned a nomination for the Premios Lo Nuestro nomination for the video.

On March 29, 2019, Lele released her English-language debut, and her first country song with the Jake Owen duet "Señorita" from his album Greetings from... Jake.

Pons took over hosting of La Voz... México on October 14, 2018. She presented the 19th Annual Latin Grammy Awards with Aitana.

On December 6, 2019, Pons released her new single and music video "Vete Pa La". The music video was self-directed and edited by Pons and produced by Shots Studios.

In December 2019, Pons was a co-host on the red carpet alongside Chelsea Briggs for the 2019 Billboard Women in Music.

Pons was a guest speaker at the 2020 CES conference held in Las Vegas. As a digital media mogul and global entertainer, Pons was asked to be a speaker on the Spotify panel alongside Spotify's Chief Content Officer Dawn Ostroff. She talked about how Spotify revolutionized music and impacted her career and how she plans on using that same model for her upcoming podcast with Spotify.

On August 19, 2020, Pons released the first episode of Best Kept Secrets with Lele Pons, a podcast on Spotify in which anonymous callers share "eyebrow raising experiences they don't dare share with friends and family".

In 2022, Pons competed in season four of ¿Quién es la máscara? as "Pulpo" (which is Spanish for "Octopus"). She was the first to be eliminated.

In 2023, Pons competed in season nine of The Masked Singer as "Jackalope". She was eliminated on "Sesame Street Night" alongside Malin Akerman as "Squirrel".

Later in 2023, Pons was announced as a contestant on the 32nd season of Dancing with the Stars, partnered with professional dancer Brandon Armstrong.

== Personal life ==
Although Pons was raised in Miami from the age of five, she remained solely a Venezuelan citizen until acquiring US citizenship at the age of 23.

Pons began dating Puerto Rican rapper Guaynaa in December 2020. They got engaged in July 2022 and married on March 4, 2023. On March 9, 2025, Pons and Guaynaa announced that they are expecting their first child together. On July 26, 2025, Pons welcomed a daughter.

Pons has attention deficit hyperactive disorder, Tourette syndrome and severe obsessive–compulsive disorder.

== Filmography ==
=== Films ===
Year	Title	Role	Note
2016	My Big Fat Hispanic Family	Lele	Short film
2016	Insane Kids	Lele	Short film
2017	The Walking Dead: No Man's Land	Lele	Short film
2017	The Space Between Us	Tulsa's classmate	Cameo
2017	Scooby Doo Is Back	Daphne	Short film
2017	Latino Hunger Games	Herself	Short film
2019	Airplane Mode	Herself	Main role
2025	Larissa: The Other Side of Anitta	Herself	Documentary film

=== Television ===
Year	Title	Role	Note
2016	We Love You	Callie	TV film
2016	Keeping Up with the Powerpuff Girls	Bubbles	Web series; 3 episodes
2016	Scream	Leah	Episode: "I Know What You Did Last Summer"
2016	Escape the Night	The Hustler	Main role (season 1)
2017	Caught the Series	Clean Up Man	Guest star
2018	La Voz México	Leading	FOX EST
2019	Lip Sync Battle	Herself	Episode: “Prince Royce vs Lele Pons”
2020	The Secret Life of Lele Pons	Herself	Docu-series produced by herself
2021	Nickelodeon's Unfiltered	Herself	—
2021	Cooking with Paris	Herself	Guest
2022	¿Quién es la máscara?	Pulpo	1st unmasked (season 4)
2022	Dance Monsters	Herself / Host	8 episodes
2023	The Masked Singer	Jackalope	8th unmasked (season 9)
2023	Dancing with the Stars	Herself	Season 32 contestant
2025	The Worst Trip Around the World	Herself	Episode 3
2025	Fraggle Rock: Back to the Rock	Herself	Episode: “The First Snow of Fraggle Rock”

=== Music videos ===
Year	Title	Artist(s)	Role
2016	"She's Out of Her Mind"	Blink-182	Mark Hoppus
2017	"Summer"	Marshmello	Dorky girl
2017	"Havana"	Camila Cabello	Bella
2017	"Downtown" (lyric video)	Anitta and J Balvin	Dancer
2018	"The Middle"	Zedd, Maren Morris, and Grey	Dancer
2018	"Dicen"	Lele Pons	Singer/Lead
2018	"Celoso"	Lele Pons	Singer/Lead
2018	"Teléfono (Remix)"	Aitana and Lele Pons	Singer/Lead
2019	"Bloqueo"	Lele Pons and Fuego	Singer/Lead
2020	"Se te Nota"	Lele Pons and Guaynaa	Singer/Lead
2021	"Hit It"	Black Eyed Peas, Saweetie, and Lele Pons	Singer/Lead
2021	"Let it Snow (Navidad, Navidad, Navidad)"	Lele Pons	Singer/Lead
2024	"BBA"	Paris Hilton featuring Megan Thee Stallion	Herself
2024	"Soltera"	Shakira	Friend

== Discography ==
=== Studio albums ===
Title	Details
Capitulaciones (with Guaynaa)	Released: April 20, 2023; Label: Shots, Interscope; Formats: Digital download, streaming

=== Singles ===
==== As lead artist ====
List of singles as lead artist, with selected chart positions and certifications, showing year released
Title	Year	Peaks							Certifications	Album
Title	Year	US Latin	ARG	COL	ECU	ITA	SPA	VEN	Certifications	Album
"Dicen" (with Matt Hunter)	2018	29	—	—	—	—	84	—	RIAA: 2× Platinum (Latin)	Non-album singles
"Celoso"	2018	11	32	—	77	—	7	13	RIAA: 3× Platinum (Latin); AMPROFON: Diamond; PROMUSICAE: Platinum	Non-album singles
"Teléfono (Remix)" (with Aitana)	2018	—	—	46	—	—	—	75		Tráiler
"Bloqueo" (with Fuego)	2019	42	—	84	11	—	—	56		Non-album singles
"Los Puti (Shorts)" (with Favian Lovo and Lyanno)	2019	—	—	—	—	—	—	—		Non-album singles
"Vete Pa La"	2019	—	—	—	—	—	—	—		Non-album singles
"Volar" (featuring Susan Díaz and Victor Cardenas)	2020	—	—	—	—	—	—	—		Non-album singles
"Se Te Nota" (with Guaynaa)	2020	33	18	24	7	62	17	— (Note: "Se Te Nota" did not enter the Monitor Latino Venezuelan Airplay chart, but peaked at number six on the Venezuelan Pop Airplay chart.)	RIAA: 3× Platinum (Latin); AMPROFON: 2× Diamond; FIMI: Gold; PROMUSICAE: Platinum	Non-album singles
"Sucio y Lento" (with Mariah Angeliq)	2020	—	—	—	—	—	—	—		Non-album singles
"Bubble Gum" (with Yandel)	2021	—	—	—	—	—	—	—		Non-album singles
"Al Lau"	2021	—	—	—	—	—	—	—		Non-album singles
"Abajo y Arriba" (with Juhn)	2021	—	—	—	—	—	—	—		Non-album singles
"Let It Snow (Navidad, Navidad, Navidad)"	2021	—	—	—	—	—	—	—		Non-album singles
"Restart" (with Vf7 and Ninow y Candy)	2022	—	—	—	—	—	—	—		15
"Piketona" (with Kim Loaiza)	2022	—	—	—	—	—	—	—		Non-album single
"Abajito" (with Guaynaa)	2023	—	—	—	—	—	—	—		Capitulaciones
"De Party En Party" (with Guaynaa)	2023	—	—	—	—	—	—	—		Capitulaciones
"Las Burbujas del Jacuzzi" (with India Martínez and Greeicy)	2024	—	—	—	—	—	—	—		Non-album single
"—" denotes a recording that did not chart or was not released in that territory.

==== As featured artist ====
List of singles as featured artist, showing year released
Title	Year	Album
"Hit It" (Black Eyed Peas featuring Saweetie and Lele Pons)	2021	Non-album single

== Guest appearances ==
List of non-single guest appearances, with other performing artists, showing year released and album name
Title	Year	Other artist(s)	Album
"Señorita"	2019	Jake Owen	Greetings from... Jake
"Rendezvous"	2022	Florida Georgia Line	Greatest Hits

== Awards and nominations ==
Award	Year	Nominated work	Category	Result	Ref.
Eres Awards Mexico	2019	Herself	Queen of Instagram	Nominated	—
iHeartRadio Music Awards	2019	Herself	Social Star Award	Nominated	
iHeartRadio Music Awards	2019	Herself	Best New Latin Artist	Nominated	
Lo Nuestro Awards	2019	"Celoso"	Video of the Year	Nominated	
MTV Millennial Awards	2017	Herself	Worldwide Instagrammer of the Year	Nominated	
MTV Millennial Awards	2017	Herself (with Juanpa Zurita, Anwar Jibawi)	Best YouTube Collaboration (Supercollab)	Nominated	
MTV Millennial Awards	2018	Herself	Worldwide Instagrammer of the Year	Won	—
MTV Millennial Awards	2018	Herself	Instastories of the Year	Nominated	—
MTV Millennial Awards	2018	Herself	Dance Cover	Nominated	—
MTV Millennial Awards	2021	Herself	Global Creator	Nominated	
Nickelodeon Mexico Kids' Choice Awards	2018	Herself	Favorite YouTuber	Nominated	
People's Choice Awards	2016	Herself	Favorite Social Media Star	Nominated	
People's Choice Awards	2018	Herself	The Social Star of 2018	Nominated	
Premios Juventud	2016	Herself	6 Segundos de Fama	Nominated	
Premios Juventud	2019	Herself	Triple Threat	Won	
Shorty Awards	2015	Herself	Choice Viner	Nominated	
Shorty Awards	2018	Herself	YouTuber of the Year	Nominated	
Streamy Awards	2015	Herself	Best Viner	Nominated	
Streamy Awards	2016	Escape the Night	Best Ensemble Cast	Won	
Teen Choice Awards	2014	Herself	Choice Viner	Nominated	
Teen Choice Awards	2015	Herself	Choice Viner	Nominated	
Teen Choice Awards	2015	Herself	Choice Web Star: Female	Nominated	
Teen Choice Awards	2016	Herself	Choice Viner	Won	
Teen Choice Awards	2017	Herself	Choice Web Star: Comedy	Nominated	
Teen Choice Awards	2018	Herself	Choice Web Star: Comedy	Nominated	
Teen Choice Awards	2018	Herself	Choice Female Web Star	Nominated	
Teen Choice Awards	2018	Herself	Choice YouTuber	Nominated	
Tu Awards Mexico	2018	Herself	Queen of Instagram	Nominated	
