= Vai Anitta =

Biographical documentary series about Anitta

- Genre: Documentary
- Countries of origin: Brazil; United States
- Original languages: Portuguese; English
- No. of seasons: 1
- No. of episodes: 6

Production
- Executive producers: Anitta; John Shahidi; Sam Shahidi
- Production locations: Rio de Janeiro; Salvador; Miami; New York City
- Production company: Shots Studios

Original release
- Network: Netflix
- Release: November 16, 2018

Related
- Anitta: Made in Honório

Vai Anitta (English: Go Anitta) is a biographical docu-series produced by Shots Studios and released on Netflix.

== Synopsis ==
The six-episode first season follows Brazilian artist Anitta as she steps into the international spotlight, going behind-the-scenes at performances, studio sessions, and video shoots all over the world. In addition to giving an up-close view of Anitta, the artist, the series also provides an intimate look at Anitta as a then-24-year-old balancing the stress of stardom, the entertainment industry, and a personal life.

== Production and release ==
Variety announced the series in July 2018 and it aired, on Netflix, on November 16, 2018, days after Anitta released her EP Solo.

Initially a second season of the series was confirmed. However, in October 2020, Netflix announced the launch of the series Anitta: Made in Honorio in place of a second season.

== See also ==
- List of original programs distributed by Netflix
