= Best Kept Secrets with Lele Pons =

Presentation
- Hosted by: Lele Pons
- Language: English

Production
- Production: Shots Studios

Publication
- Original release: August 19, 2020
- Provider: Spotify

Best Kept Secrets with Lele Pons is a weekly podcast produced by Shots Studios and exclusively distributed by Spotify. Hosted by American YouTuber Lele Pons, the podcast invites anonymous callers to share deeply personal and intimate secrets that they have kept from family and friends. The podcast debuted on August 19, 2020.

== Background ==
In November 2019, The Hollywood Reporter announced that Pons signed an exclusive deal with Spotify to create an original podcast. Pons was one of a handful of high-profile celebrities and figures—including former President Barack Obama, former First Lady Michelle Obama, and actors Jordan Peele and Mark Wahlberg—to reach agreements with the Swedish streaming giant as a part of Spotify's quest to produce an impressive slate of podcasts to compete with other streaming services.

Pons joined actor and filmmaker Paul Feig and Spotify's Chief Content Officer Dawn Ostroff at CES in January 2020. As reported by Variety, Pons told attendees "I haven't been this excited since I did my first YouTube video" in regards to the podcast.

On August 12, 2020, Pons released a 58-second introductory snippet, providing insight into the format, notably that each episode would feature two callers joining her. The Hollywood Reporter noted that Pons serves as a "sounding board" for her guests.

The first episode—titled "Sex Clubs & Evil Stepmoms"—debuted on August 19, 2020.

Best Kept Secrets with Lele Pons is produced by Shots Studios, the creative studio that also manages Pons.

== Episodes ==
Episode	Title	Release date	Length
1	"Sex Clubs & Evil Stepmoms"	August 19, 2020	31:55
2	"Orgies & Fake Graduations"	August 26, 2020	24:56
3	"Cousin Sex & Hidden Bananas"	September 2, 2020	26:03
4	"Cheating Fiancé & Sex Barber"	September 9, 2020	24:52
5	"Secret Marriage & BFF Sabotage"	September 16, 2020	23:31
6	"The Seven Year Crush"	September 23, 2020	29:05
7	"Dads, Dolls, & The New Normal"	September 30, 2020	33:02
8	"How To Silence Your Bullies"	October 7, 2020	21:50
9	"My Secret Surgery"	October 14, 2020	28:11
10	"Mike Majlak's Best Kept Secret"	October 21, 2020	44:06
11	"My Secret Hookup"	October 28, 2020	23:33
12	"Facing My Fears"	November 4, 2020	33:57
13	"Im Living A Double Life!"	November 11, 2020	25:49
14	"Family Secrets Revealed"	November 18, 2020	27:33
15	"Life As A Sugar Baby"	November 25, 2020	30:54
16	"Holiday Horror Stories"	December 2, 2020	29:33
17	"Beginners Guide To Fetishes"	December 9, 2020	25:32
18	"Naughty Or Nice Special, Pt. 1"	December 16, 2020	21:51
19	"Naughty Or Nice Special, Pt. 2"	December 23, 2020	23:45
20	"Money Moves"	December 30, 2020	23:23
21	"The Undercover Exorcist"	January 6, 2021	23:15
22	"The Lonely Hearts Club"	January 13, 2021	25:56
23	"Bad Hair Day"	January 20, 2021	23:26
24	"Father's Worst Nightmare"	January 27, 2021	21:16
25	"To Pee Or Not To Pee?"	February 3, 2021	22:52
26	"Lets Talk About Love"	February 10, 2021	29:16
27	"Sickest Episode Ever"	February 17, 2021	26:10
28	"Food For Thought"	February 24, 2021	29:23
29	"Rough Day Remedies"	March 3, 2021	20:00
30	"Friendship Rules"	March 10, 2021	23:51
31	"True Crime Confessions"	March 17, 2021	28:33
32	"Hidden Fortunes"	March 24, 2021	25:08
33	"Threat Level: Orange"	March 31, 2021	26:21
34	"Married To The Wrong Man"	April 7, 2021	23:25
35	"Invasion Of Privacy"	April 14, 2021	22:09
36	"Fleshlight VS "The Real Thing""	April 21, 2021	29:05
37	"Sex, Lies, and Cosplay"	April 28, 2021	28:23
38	"Period Drama"	May 5, 2021	22:38
39	"Take This To Your Grave"	May 12, 2021	23:40
40	"The Dating Game"	May 19, 2021	22:20
41	"My Own Best Friend"	May 26, 2021	19:39
42	"Flirting With Disaster"	June 2, 2021	22:38
43	"OCD Dissected with Jazzmyne Jay"	June 9, 2021	39:39
44	"Religious Differences"	June 16, 2021	22:12
45	"The Truth Is In Her Eyes"	June 23, 2021	29:49
46	"Choose Before You Lose"	June 30, 2021	31:55
47	"Cheap Tricks"	July 7, 2021	35:20
48	"Whats In Your Pants"	July 14, 2021	27:39
49	"No Business Like Heaux Business"	July 21, 2021	34:24
50	"Lele and Guaynaa's Guide to Love"	July 28, 2021	43:04

A total of 50 episodes were released as of January 2022, with the last episode released on July 28, 2021.
