= Rudy Mancuso =

American internet personality

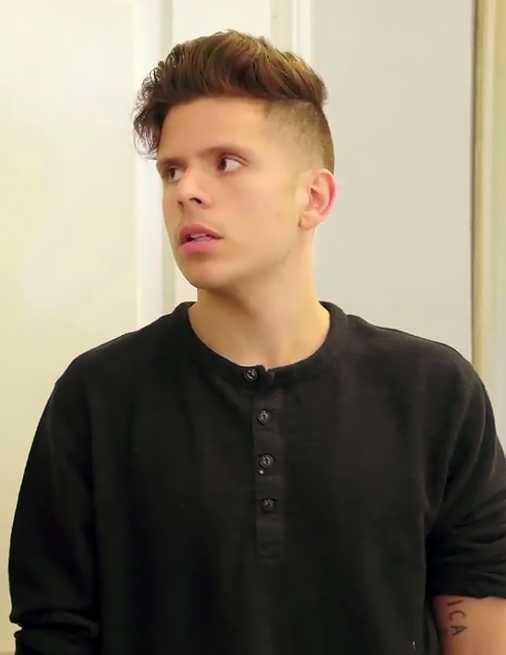
- Mancuso in 2019
- Born: Rodolfo Mancuso; February 28, 1992 (age 34); Glen Ridge, New Jersey, US
- Education: Glen Ridge High School
- Occupations: Internet personality; musician; filmmaker; actor
- Years active: 2013–present
- Partner(s): Camila Mendes (2022–present; engaged)

YouTube information
- Channels: Rudy Mancuso; Awkward Puppets
- Genre: Comedy
- Subscribers: 7.37 million (Rudy Mancuso); 2.7 million (Awkward Puppets)
- Views: 1.08 billion (Rudy Mancuso); 337 million (Awkward Puppets)

Rodolfo Mancuso (born February 28, 1992) is an American Internet personality, musician, filmmaker, and actor. He is known for making comedy skits with his friends on YouTube and Vine as well as for being behind many voices in the YouTube channel Awkward Puppets. He made his filmmaking debut in 2024 with Música.

== Early life ==
Rodolfo Mancuso was born and grew up in Glen Ridge, New Jersey, the son of an Italian-American father and a Brazilian mother, along with a sister, Marianna. Rudy attended Glen Ridge High School and Rutgers University Newark. He lived in Rio de Janeiro for a while and speaks Portuguese fluently. He started playing the piano at the age of five.

== Career ==
Rudy Mancuso - "Mama" (Official Music Video)

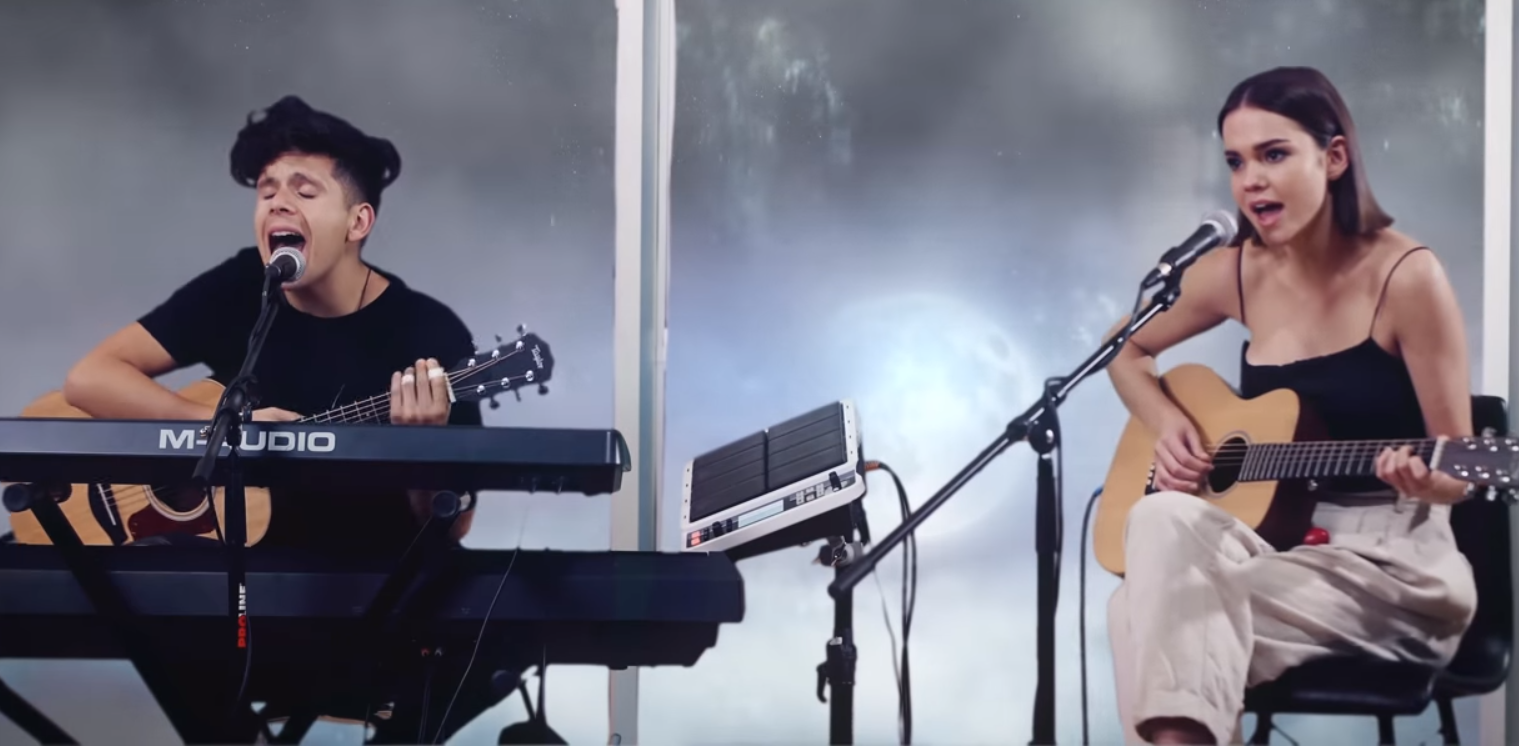
Mancuso and Maia Mitchell in 2018

Mancuso started his Vine channel in 2013. He was often known for his Latino characters as well as his IRL videos. Mancuso's partnered with Shots Studios to create videos and launched his YouTube channel in 2016.

He has been featured on Comedy Central's Drunk History and HBO's Outpost. He also starred in YouTube Red's Keys of Christmas along with Mariah Carey and DJ Khaled.

Awkward Puppets, a puppet series on the YouTube platform, is owned by Mancuso and Shots Studios. He was the opener for Justin Bieber's Purpose World Tour in Brazil's section of his Latin America shows in 2017.

Dolce & Gabbana invited Mancuso to walk in their Milan Men's Fashion Week Spring/Summer 2018 show on June 17, 2017. He performed and presented an award at the 2017 MTV Millennial Awards in Mexico.

In July 2017, Mancuso performed at Villa Mix, in Goiânia for two consecutive days. On October 6, 2017, he released his first single, "Black & White," in collaboration with songwriter/producer Poo Bear. On October 7, 2017, Mancuso performed at the Villa Mix festival in São Paulo.

Mancuso's next single, "Mama", was his first video single without a featured artist. The video, which he directed, featured Chantel Jeffries and according to Billboard evoked "odd nostalgia". He also released an original song coloration with Alesso on the latter's channel. In 2018, Mancuso directed the music video for Lele Pons' debut solo single "Celoso" and the music video for Alesso's single "REMEDY." Mancuso also directed the music video for O.A.R.'s single "Miss You All The Time" which was released in October 2018.

Mancuso collaborated with fellow comedian and musician Simon Rex for the video "Storytelling" which was released on his channel July 2018.

In September 2018, Mancuso joined O.A.R. at Red Rocks Amphitheater in Colorado for a performance. He and fellow Shots Studios artist Lele Pons hosted the 2018 Hispanic Heritage Foundation Awards show. The two performed Pons' "Celoso," with Mancuso playing the instrumental on the piano.

In September 2018, Mancuso released his fourth single, "Lento." In October 2018, he released "Superhero Therapy" with Lele Pons, Anwar Jibawi, and King Bach. The video is the most recent installment of his super hero series, which has over 68 million views total.

In November 2018, Mancuso both performed and received an award at the 2018 ALMAs. The award was presented by fellow Shots Studios star Alesso. He also performed a cover of Queen's You're My Best Friend in support of Netflix's Bohemian Rhapsody (film) and the Mercury Phoenix Trust which was released to his YouTube channel. He also hosted the 'Concert for Tommy's Field', a charity event held at the Orpheum Theater in Los Angeles. Performances included Lele Pons, Bryce Vine, and others.

Mancuso has produced sponsored videos working with companies such as Target and Clif bar which blend music and comedy. He also appeared in a video with basketball star Stephen Curry for Brita water filters.

=== Filmmaking ===
In 2022, Mancuso was working on his directorial debut Música, starring himself, Camila Mendes, Francesca Reale, & JB Smoove and premiered on Prime Video in April 2024. After the premiere, Mancuso was reportedly set to direct the thriller "Stand-In" for Amazon MGM Studios & "Bob the Musical" for Walt Disney Pictures.

== Personal life ==
From 2015 to early 2022, Mancuso was in a relationship with Australian actress Maia Mitchell.

As of 2020, Mancuso lives in Studio City, Los Angeles.

In July 2022, Mancuso began dating actress Camila Mendes. The two first met on the set of Música. They became engaged on October 24, 2025.

== Discography ==
=== Studio albums ===
List of studio albums, with selected details
Title	Album details
bored at home	Released: April 23, 2020; Labels: Shot Studios Music; Formats: digital download

=== Singles ===
Year	Title	Album
2017	"Black & White" (with Poo Bear)	non-album singles
2018	"Magic" (with Maia Mitchell)	non-album singles
2018	"Mama"	non-album singles
2018	"Lento"	non-album singles
2019	"Anda Pal Carajo (APC)" (with XAXO and Mau y Ricky)	non-album singles
2019	"Circle of Love"	non-album singles
2019	"I Think I'm Cool"	non-album singles
2024	Various	Upgraded (Original Motion Picture Soundtrack)

== Filmography ==
=== Music videos ===
Year	Title	Character
2017	"Black and White"	Himself
2018	"Magic"	Himself
2018	"Everything is Alright"	Himself
2018	"Mama"	Himself
2018	"Lento"	Himself
2019	"I Think I'm Cool"	Himself

=== Film ===
Year	Title	Character	Notes	Ref.
2016	The Keys of Christmas	Himself		
2016	Petting Scorpions	Leader		
2019	Rim of the World	Wes		
2020	A Celebration of the Music from Coco	Himself		
2023	The Flash	Albert Desmond		
2024	Música	Rudy	Directorial debut, also writer, executive producer, and composer	

Key
†	Denotes films that have not yet been released

=== Series ===
Year	Title	Character	Ref.
2015	Drunk History	Manuel Bonilla	
2016	Outpost	Corresponding	
2025	It: Welcome to Derry	Captain Pauly Russo	

=== Television ===
Year	Title	Role	Notes	Ref.
2017	2017 MTV Millennial Awards	Presenter	Presented International Hit of the Year	
2018	Vai Anitta	Himself	6 episodes	
