= Juanpa Zurita =

Mexican YouTuber (born 1996)

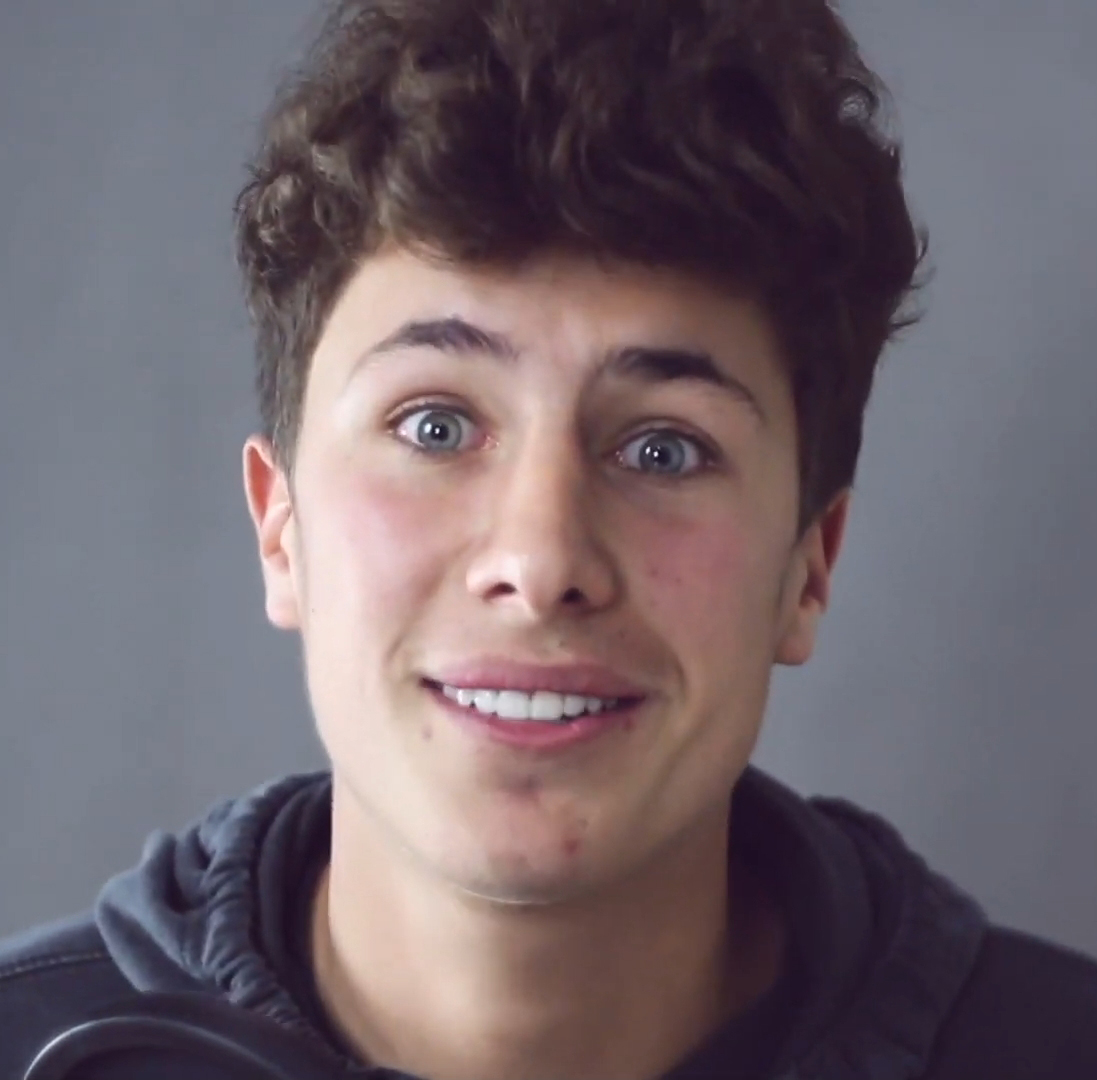
- Zurita in 2019
- Born: Juan Pablo Martínez-Zurita Arellano; 29 March 1996 (age 30); Mexico City, Mexico
- Occupations: Internet personality; actor; model
- Years active: 2013–present

Juan Pablo Martínez-Zurita Arellano (born 29 March 1996), commonly known as Juanpa Zurita, is a Mexican internet personality, actor and model. He became known in 2013 through making comedy videos on the Vine app. Later, he diversified his activities by publishing vlogs and entertainment videos on the YouTube platform, and most recently he started his own water company in the middle of a drought, exploiting the resources of his own country. He created various campaigns in favor of humanitarian aid, in one of which he raised 25 million Mexican pesos through donations to make houses to several victims of an earthquake in Mexico City, in September 2017. In 2016, he began modelling for fashion brands including Pull&Bear, Louis Vuitton, Dolce & Gabbana and Calvin Klein.

In 2015, he was chosen for the first time as "icon of the year" by MTV Latin America. He has acted in secondary roles in short films. In 2018, he played the role of Alex Basteri the Luis Miguel's brother in the Luis Miguel TV series.

He has 25.5 million followers on Instagram, more than 10 million on YouTube, six million on Facebook, and five million on Twitter.

In 2017, he was on the Forbes 30 Under 30 list of people in Hollywood and the entertainment industry.

== Early life ==
Juan Pablo Martínez-Zurita was born on 29 March 1996, in Mexico City, Mexico, to Fernando Martínez-Zurita Reed and Teresa Arellano. He has two brothers and one sister: Fernando Zurita, Andrés Zurita, and Paola Zurita.

His family moved to the United States during his youth following his father's appointment as a political counselor at the Mexican Embassy in Washington, D.C. Zurita now lives in Los Angeles.

He posted his first Vine on 11 June 2013, which was named "That dog killed chuck norris and was after me." This first short video featuring his dog, Puca, received thousands of views in a few days. His subsequent vines were often created with his brother, Andrés Zurita.

== Career ==
Zurita began his career as a content creator on his Vine account, which attracted followers from around the world. He published content in both Spanish and English. When the Vine application closed in 2017, he had more than 1.8 million followers. He continued his online presence through his Instagram account, where he has more than 25 million followers, and created a YouTube channel with videos almost exclusively in Spanish.

=== Modeling ===
Zurita began modelling in 2016, being the frequent image of the firm Pull&Bear in its events, as a model and as a guest artist in the openings of the new sites of the Inditex brand or in the launch of new collections of men's clothing. Later, in October of that same year, he was photographed to promote Calvin Klein in Mexico. In 2017 he collaborated in the Paris fashion show with Louis Vuitton, paraded for Dolce & Gabbana on the Fashion Week runway in Milan and appeared on the cover of the July–August 2017 edition of GQ Italia with Luka Sabbat, Austin Mahone and Rafferty Law.

=== Acting ===
Juanpa Zurita has participated in some audiovisual projects, films and TV series. In May 2017 Netflix announced that it would make a series about the life of Luis Miguel, with Juanpa Zurita playing Alex, the singer's brother.

=== TV appearances ===
On 3 June 2017 Juan Pablo Zurita and Lele Pons hosted the 2017 MTV Millennial Awards at the Palacio de los Deportes in Mexico City. It was broadcast on 4 June 2017 throughout MTV Latin America. During the ceremony, he was named 'Digital Icon of the Year'. In 2020, Zurita joined the cast of season 4 Mexican singing competition, Pequeños Gigantes as a judge. On 23 October 2020, it was announced that Zurita would be the host of Nickelodeon's The Substitute in its second season.

=== Business ===
In March 2018 he became a partner in the Mexican alternative fashion brand Acapella and reached an agreement with the Spanish accessories firm Hawkers.

According to some media, Juan Pablo Zurita earnings exceeds or is close to one million dollars per year.

== Other activities ==
In March 2017, Juan Pablo Zurita, Chakabars, Jérôme Jarre, Casey Neistat and Ben Stiller campaigned against famine in Somalia. The movement, called Love Army For Somalia, has collected more than 2 million dollars. In May, Juan Pablo Zurita went to Somalia, with a plane lent by Turkish Airlines, in order to distribute the food bought with the money collected by the Love Army, to Somali families.

== Filmography ==
Year	Title	Role	Notes
2016	My Big Fat Hispanic Family	Juanpa	Short
2017	Alexander IRL	Bob esponja	Film
2017	Next Top Model	Juanpa	Short
2017	Fight of the Living Dead	Himself	TV series
2018–2021	Luis Miguel	Alex Basteri	TV series
2018	The Last Jotita	Jackson	Film
2019	Airplane Mode	Himself	Film
2020	Mainstream	Juanpa	Film
2024	Una pequeña confusión	Film	

== Nominations and awards ==
Year	Award	Category	Results
2015	MTV Millennial Awards	Digital Icon of the Year	Won
2015	MTV Millennial Awards	Viner of the Year	Won
2015	Eliot Awards	Viner of the Year	Won
2016	MTV Millennial Awards	Digital Icon of the Year	Nominated
2016	MTV Millennial Awards	Mexican Snapchatter of the Year	Won
2016	MTV Millennial Awards	Best Performance in an App	Won
2016	Premios Juventud	6 Segundos de Fama	Nominated
2016	Premios Juventud	Mi Artista Tropical	Nominated
2016	Melty Future Awards	Cool is everywhere México	Won
2016	GQ Awards	Digital Man of the Year	Won
2017	MTV Millennial Awards	Digital Icon of the Year	Won
2017	MTV Millennial Awards	Best YouTube Collaboration with Lele Pons and Anwar Jibawi	Nominated
2017	MTV Millennial Awards	Best YouTube Collaboration with Julián Serrano and Mario Ruiz	Nominated
2017	MTV Millennial Awards	Mexican Instagrammer of the Year	Nominated
2017	Nickelodeon Kids' Choice Awards	Favorite Latin Star	Nominated
2018	Shorty Awards	YouTuber of the Year	Nominated
2023	Children's and Family Emmy Awards	Outstanding Host – Elmo's Mindfulness Spectacular!	Nominated
