= List of La Venganza de los Ex cast members =

The following is a list of cast members who have appeared in the Mexican reality television programme La Venganza de los Ex VIP.

== Cast ==
- **Bold** indicates original cast member; all other cast were brought into the series as an ex
- Ages at the time the cast member appeared in the series

Key: = "Cast member" returns to the beach for the second time
Key: = "Cast member" returns to the beach for the third time.

N°	Cast member	Age	Exes
1	**Aylin Criss**	22	Michelle Lando, Ricky Arenal
1	**Brandon Castañeda**	20	Diana Zambrano
1	**Daphne Montesinos**	29	—N/a
1	**Esteban Martínez**	33	Carolina Lima
1	**Frida Urbina**	26	Daniel Fraga
1	**Ian García**	28	Diana Zambrano, Juanita Alvis
1	**Juan Camilo Pulgarín**	25	Andres Restrepo, David Segura
1	**Kelly Medan**	22	Karen Saldaña
1	**Kimberly "Kim" Shantal**	25	Luis Guillén
1	**Roberto "Robbie" Mora**	27	Diana Zambrano
1	Diana Zambrano	24	Brandon Castañeda, Ian García, Roberto Mora
1	Luis "Suavecito" Guillén	23	Kimberly Shantal
1	Karen Saldaña	26	Kelly Medanie
1	Christian David Segura	22	Juan Camilo Pulgarin
1	Michelle Lando	21	Aylin Criss
1	Ricky Arenal	19	Aylin Criss
1	Daniel Fraga	24	Frida Urbina, Mariana Ayala
1	Andres Restrepo		Juan Camilo Pulgarin
1	Mariana Ayala	19	Daniel Fraga, Helian Evans
1	Carolina Lima	27	Esteban Martínez
1	Juanita Alvis	19	Ian García
1	Helian Evans	23	Mariana Ayala
2	**Ana Cisneros**	22	Jibranne Bazán
2	**Brandon Meza**	24	Carolina Godoy
2	**Christian Renaud**	22	—N/a
2	**Diana Estrada**	25	Jay Castro
2	**Isaac Torres**	26	Andrea Gasca
2	**Leslie Gallardo**	22	Eduardo Martínez
2	**Lizbeth Rodríguez**	28	Ali
2	**Pedro "La Divaza" Figueira**	23	Andrés Aron Carruyo, Eliot Liendo
2	**Rafael "Rufas" Delgado**	26	Michelle Lando, Yesica, Olivieri
2	**Yurgenis Aular**	27	—N/a
2	Andrea Gasca	28	Isaac Torres
2	Jay Castro	24	Diana Estrada, Kaly Aispuro
2	Andrés Aron Carruyo		Pedro Figueira
2	Michelle Lando	22	Rafael Delgado, Jibranne Bazán
2	Eduardo "Lalo" Martínez	26	Leslie Gallardo
2	Ali	25	Lizbeth Rodríguez
2	Carolina Godoy	24	Brandon Meza
2	Eliot Liendo		Pedro Figueira
2	Jibranne "Jey" Bazán	30	Ana Cisneros, Michelle Lando
2	Yesica "Yess" Olivieri		Rafael Delgado
2	Kaly Aispuro	20	Jay Castro
3	**Aldo Tamez De Nigris**	24	—N/a
3	**Alejandro "Alex" Flores**	26	Kevin Achutegui
3	**Ana Ovalle**	26	Fano
3	**Asaf Torres**	25	Valeria Salinas, Genesys Martinez
3	**Daniela "Queen" Buenrostro**	26	Cédric Mejía, Brandon Castañeda
3	**Diana Zambrano**	26	Bryan Macedo, Brandon Castañeda
3	**Fernanda "Fershy" Moreno**	25	Beni Falcón, Alba Zepeda
3	**José "Fraag" Sánchez**	29	Yasmila Mendeguía
3	**Lilian Durán**	29	Salvador García
3	**Valentino Lázaro**	27	Brayan Varón
3	Beni Falcón	29	Fernanda Moreno
3	Brayan Varón		Valentino Lázaro, Nina
3	Valeria Salinas		Asaf Torres
3	Kevin Achutegui	25	Alejandro Flores, Delmy
3	Alba Zepeda	28	Fernanda Moreno
3	Salvador "Shava" García		Lilian Durán
3	Fano	28	Ana Ovalle
3	Yasmila Mendeguía	26	José Sánchez
3	Bryan Macedo	25	Diana Zambrano, Daniela Alexis
3	Nina	23	Brayan Varón
3	Cédric Mejía		Daniela Buenrostro
3	Daniela "Bebeshita" Barceló	32	Bryan Macedo, Brandon Castañeda
3	Delmy	27	Kevin Achutegui
3	Brandon Castañeda	22	Daniela Buenrostro, Diana Zambrano, Daniela Barceló
3	Genesys Martinez	27	Asaf Torres
4	**Claudia "Clau" Ariz**	21	Ana Cisneros
4	**Crystal Meza**	28	César Díaz
4	**Dennis Arana**	26	Adrián Andrés, Konrad Montero, Farley Ortiz
4	**Fernanda Arriella**	22	Roger Guerra
4	**Irvin Villatoro**	28	Yesenia Canales
4	**Jacky Ramírez**	27	—N/a
4	**Jose "La Jose" Santos**	30	Konrad Montero
4	**Luis "Suavecito" Guillén**	29	Kimberly Shantal
4	**Matías Ochoa**	26	Yurgenis Aular
4	**Samantha "Sami" Herrera**	31	Diego Castellanos
4	Adrián Andrés	30	Dennis Arana
4	César "Ken" Díaz		Crystal Meza
4	Yurgenis Aular	26	Matías Ochoa, Simone Coppola
4	Ana Cisneros		Claudia Ariz, Melisa Ruiz
4	Simone Coppola	29	Yurgenis Aular
4	Kimberly "Kim" Shantal	28	Luis Guillén
4	Konrad Montero	27	Dennis Arana, Jose Santos
4	Roger Guerra		Fernanda Arriella
4	Diego Castellanos	30	Samantha Herrera
4	Melisa Ruiz	22	Ana Cisneros
4	Yesenia Canales	27	Irvin Villatoro, Santiago Santana
4	Santiago Santana		Yesenia Canales
4	Farley Ortiz	29	Dennis Arana
5	**Abel Robles**	30	Frida Urbina
5	**Cami Pulgarín**	29	Santiago Uribe
5	**Henry Jimenez**	28	Pedro Figueira
5	**Ignacia Michelson**	32	Diego Venegas
5	**Joako Fabrega**	31	—N/a
5	**Michel "It's Michhh" Chávez**	24	Eduardo Schobert
5	**Pedro "La Divaza" Figueira**	27	Henry Jimenez, Freyder Cantillo
5	**Roberto "Robbie" Mora**	27	Camila Khusrevi, Aurora Sogo
5	**Rodolfo "Rodel" González**	27	Janice Betancurt
5	**Ximena Nazor**	23	Rodrigo Villegas
5	**Yesenia Canales**	28	Asaf Torres
5	Janice Betancurt	36	Rodolfo González
5	Asaf Torres		Yesenia Canales
5	Frida Urbina	30	Abel Robles
5	Eduardo "Eddie" Schobert	31	Michel Chávez
5	Camila Khusrevi	24	Roberto Mora
5	Diego Venegas	21	Ignacia Michelson
5	Freyder Cantillo	26	Pedro Figueira, Sebastián Reyes
5	Santiago "Tiago" Uribe	21	Cami Pulgarín, Xiomara Vélez
5	Aurora Sogo	28	Roberto Mora
5	Rodrigo Villegas	28	Ximena Nazor
5	Xiomara Vélez		Santiago Uribe
5	Sebastián Reyes	25	Freyder Cantillo
