= 2024 MTV MIAW Awards =

Annual Latin American music awards

- Date: July 13, 2024
- Location: Pepsi Center WTC, Mexico City
- Hosted by: Young Miko and Ricky Limón

Highlights
- Most wins: Natanael Cano, Karol G & Cry (3)
- Most nominations: Young Miko (7)
- Website: Official site

Television/radio coverage
- Network: MTV; TikTok; Paramount+; Pluto TV; Facebook

The 11th Annual MTV MIAW Awards took place on July 13, 2024, at the Pepsi Center WTC in Mexico City, to recognize the best in Latin American pop culture of 2024. It was broadcast live on MTV Latin America, as well as on TikTok and Paramount+, with the red carpet being available on Pluto TV. The ceremony was hosted by Puerto Rican rapper Young Miko and Mexican YouTuber Ricky Limón.

The nominations were announced on June 11, 2024. Host Young Miko led the nominations with seven, followed by Mexican singers Danna and Natanael Cano (both with six each). The categories for Regional Artist, Pop Explosion, Reggaeton Artist, Epic Kiss, Event of the Year, and Top Gamer were introduced while K-POP Domination, Mexican Artist, Global Hit of the Year, Embarrassment of the Year, and Global Creator were dropped. Singers Natanael Cano and Karol G (including Event of the Year), and influencer Cry were the main winners of the ceremony with three wins each.

== Performers ==
Artist(s)	Song(s)	Ref
Young Miko	"Tamagotchi"	
Michelle Maciel	"CCC"	
Gabito Ballesteros	"Neta" "Perfecta"	
Danna	"The Fall" "Blackout" "Platonik" "Atari" "VTR3"	

== Winners and nominees ==
Winners are listed first and highlighted in bold. Some categories are followed with their name in Spanish for clarity.

=== Music ===
MIAW Artist (Artista MIAW)	Artist to Watch (Artista en la Mira)
**Natanael Cano**; Young Miko; Peso Pluma; Feid; Danna; Karol G; Fuerza Regida; Bizarrap	**El Bogueto**; Los Esquivel; Delilah; Sofía Castro; Nsqk; Emjay; Pink Pablo; Elena Rose
Flow Artist (Artista + Flow)	Pop Explosion (Explosión Pop del Año)
**Young Miko**; Rels B; Charles Ans; Trueno; La Joaqui; Duki; Nicki Nicole; Yandel	**Danna**; Emilia; Humbe; Tini; Lagos; Aitana; Danny Ocean; Camilo
Regional Artist (Artista + Belicón)	Reggaeton Artist (Reggaetonero del Año)
**Natanael Cano**; Fuerza Regida; Gabito Ballesteros; Junior H; Xavi; Chino Pacas; Peso Pluma; Marca Registrada	**Yeri Mua**; Bellakath; El Malilla; El Bogueto; Yng Lvcas; Ghetto Kids; Yeyo; Uzielito Mix
Viral Anthem (Himno Viral)	Bellakeo Supremo
**"La Diabla" – Xavi**; "Lollipop" – Darell; "Patadas de Ahogado" – Latin Mafia & Humbe; "Lala" – Myke Towers; "Gata Only" – FloyyMenor & Cris MJ; "Ride or Rie, Pt.2" – Sevdaliza, Villano Antillano & Tokischa; "Harley Quinn" – Fuerza Regida & Marshmello; "Be de Bellako" – El Malilla, Yeyo & Dj Rockwel Mx	**"Línea del Perreo" – Yeri Mua, Uzielito Mix, El Jordan 23 & DJ Kire**; "Fecha" – Feid & Yandel; "Bellakeo" – Peso Pluma & Anitta; "Offline" – Young Miko & Feid; "La Falda" – Myke Towers; "Qlona" – Karol G & Peso Pluma; "Bota Niña" – Bad Gyal & Anitta; "Gata Only" – FloyyMenor & Cris MJ
Collaboration of the Year (Junte del Año)	Video of the Year (Video del Año)
**"Madonna" – Natanael Cano & Oscar Maydon**; "Patadas de Ahogado" – Latia Mafia & Humbe; "Young Miko: Bzrp Music Sessions, Vol. 58" – Bizarrap & Young Miko; "300 Noches" – Belinda & Natanael Cano; "AQYNE" – Aitana & Danna; "Offline" – Young Miko & Feid; "El Boss" – Gabito Ballesteros & Natanael Cano; "Igual que un Ángel" – Kali Uchis & Peso Pluma	**"Contigo" – Karol G & Tiësto**; "Atari" – Danna; "Cactus" – Belinda; "El Jefe" – Shakira & Fuerza Regida; "Curita" – Young Miko; "No Me Quiero Casar" – Bad Bunny; "313" – Residente, Sílvia Pérez Cruz & Penélope Cruz; "Nada por Hecho" – Siddhartha featuring Leiva

=== Digital ===
MIAW Icon (Ícono MIAW)	Creator of the Year (Creador del Año)
**Yeri Mua**; El Mariana; Nicolle Figueroa; Ricky Limón; Esen Alva; Un Tal Fredo; Chingu Amiga; Turbulence & Burrita Burro	**Cry**; Doris Jocelyn; Spreen; Alexis Omman; Melissa Navarro; Jair Sánchez; Sonrixs; Los del Ñam
Styler GRWM	Trend Master
**Kunno**; Domelipa; Aaron Mercury; Millos999; Tammy Parra; Karen Torres; Bruses; Tini	**Juve3DStudio**; Dualupita; Ese Pérez; Ara y Fer; Dafne Zúñiga; Supersayiachamp; Marian Krawstor; Gaby Meza
Celebrity Crush	MIAWdio of the Year (MIAWdio del Año)
**Cry**; Nicki Nicole; Bad Gyal; El Malilla; Danna; Natanael Cano; Enzo Vogrincic; Kenia Os	**"Pedro Pedro Pedro" (performed by Raffaella Carrà)**; "Traka" (by Yeri Mua); "Llegué de la barbería"; "Goku? Te refieres a Magaly Chávez?"; "Me caes mal"; "Un Marciano, un marciano sentado..."; "Saltando por Marta en su cumple"; "Chipi Chipi Chapa Chapa" (performed by Christell)
Fandom	Couple Goals
**"Cryboyers" (Cry)**; "Pinkylovers" (Pinky Promise); "Swifties" (Taylor Swift); "Anitters" (Anitta); "Lilianitas" (Lily García); RBD fans; Checo Pérez fans; Los Furiosos	**Checo Pérez & Max Verstappen**; Ricardo Pérez & Susana Zabaleta; Nicolle Figueroa & Augusto Giménez; Emilio Osorio & Leslie Gallardo; Carolina Díaz & Bryan Skabeche; Zach & Dayanara; Ian Lucas & Domelipa; Aitana & Sebastián Yatra
Viral Bomb (Bomba Viral)	Crack Artist (Artista Crack del Año)
**"Doris Jocelyn - Trend Mexa"**; "Karely Ruiz cumple sueño de fan"; "Error de Cartier por 200 pesos"; "Furor de los Ternurines"; "Critican a Lucero Mijares"; "J Balvin & Reggeatoneros Mexas"; "Patitos en la cabeza"	**El Malilla**; Bad Gyal; Latin Mafia; Milo J; Michelle Maciel; Gabito Ballesteros; Xavi; Emilia
Podcast Boss (Amo de Podcast)	Comedy Boss
**Clase Libre**; Más Allá del Rosa; Par de Tres; Seis de Copas; Seres Cromáticos; El Podcast del Momento; Doble G; Karime Kooler	**Trío de Tres**; Soleon; SoyAldooo; Iram Mendiola; Ricky Limón; Dos Rayos; Wilson Alcaraz (SPITERMAN); Juli Savioli
Top Gamer EXP	IRL Streamer of the Year
**Rivers**; The Donato; ElXocas; Missasinfonia; Roier; Spreen; Jelty; Quackity	**El Mariana**; Alana Flores; Staryuuki; Franco Escamilla; Kun Agüero; AriGameplays; Germán Garmendia; Aldo_Geo
"La Patrona" of the Year	Epic Kiss
**Karol G**; Emilia; Danna; Young Miko; Rivers; Wendy Guevara; Dhasia Wezka; Xochitl Gomez	**Anitta & Peso Pluma**; La Divaza & Alfredo Adame; Madonna & Tokischa; Karely Ruiz & her fan; Manuel Turizo & his mom; La Joaqui & Luck Ra; Zendaya & Mike Faist & Josh O'Connor; Taylor Swift & Travis Kelce

=== Entertainment ===
Reality Royalty (Realeza del Reality)	Killer Series / Movie
**Chingu Amiga – LOL: Last One Laughing 6**; C-PHER – La Más Draga: Solo Las Más; Queen Buenrostro – La Venganza de los Ex VIP (Season 3); Valentino – La Venganza de los Ex VIP (Season 3); Thali García – La casa de los famosos (Season 4); Laura Bozzo – Master Chef Celebrity México; Lucero Mijares – Juego de voces; Stéfani Bays – De Férias com o Ex	**Dune: Part Two**; Mean Girls; Baby Reindeer; Bridgerton; Society of the Snow; Saltburn; South Park: The End of Obesity; Robot Dreams
Event of the Year
**Mañana Será Bonito Latam Tour**; La Velada del Año; Final Kings League; Rels B colapsa CDMX; Madonna in Río; Soy Rebelde Tour; Return of CD9; The Eras Tour
