= MTV Europe Music Award for Best Latin America North Act =

Category of MTV Europe Music Awards

The following is a list of winners and nominees for the MTV Europe Music Award for Best Latin America North Act. The category has been predominantly won by Mexican artists, also including special cases between 2017 and 2019, when Chilean-Mexican singer Mon Laferte received the award, and in 2018, when the Mexican-American duo Ha*Ash was honored with it.

== Winners and nominees ==
=== 2010s ===
Year	Artist	Nationality	Ref
2012
2012	Panda	Mexico	
2012	Danna Paola	Mexico	
2012	Jesse & Joy	Mexico	
2012	Kinky	Mexico	
2012	Ximena Sariñana	Mexico	
2013
2013	Paty Cantú	Mexico	
2013	Danna Paola	Mexico	
2013	Jesse & Joy	Mexico	
2013	León Larregui	Mexico	
2013	Reik	Mexico	
2014
2014	Dulce María	Mexico	
2014	Pxndx	Mexico	
2014	CD9	Mexico	
2014	Camila	Mexico	
2014	Zoé	Mexico	
2015
2015	Mario Bautista	Mexico	
2015	Enjambre	Mexico	
2015	Ha*Ash	United States Mexico	
2015	Kinky	Mexico	
2015	Natalia Lafourcade	Mexico	
2016
2016	Paty Cantú	Mexico	
2016	CD9	Mexico	
2016	Jesse & Joy	Mexico	
2016	León Larregui	Mexico	
2016	Mon Laferte	Chile Mexico	
2017
2017	Mon Laferte	Chile Mexico	
2017	Café Tacuba	Mexico	
2017	Caloncho	Mexico	
2017	Natalia Lafourcade	Mexico	
2017	Sofia Reyes	Mexico	
2018
2018	Ha*Ash	United States Mexico	
2018	Mon Laferte	Chile Mexico	
2018	Sofía Reyes	Mexico	
2018	Reik	Mexico	
2018	Molotov	Mexico	
2019
2019	Mon Laferte	Chile Mexico	
2019	Ed Maverick	Mexico	
2019	Jesse & Joy	Mexico	
2019	Reik	Mexico	
2019	Ximena Sariñana	Mexico	

=== 2020s ===
Year	Artist	Nationality	Ref
2020
2020	Danna Paola	Mexico	
2020	Matisse	Mexico	
2020	Jesse & Joy	Mexico	
2020	Sofía Reyes	Mexico	
2020	Zoé	Mexico	
2021
2021	Alemán	Mexico	
2021	Danna Paola	Mexico	
2021	Gera MX	Mexico	
2021	Humbe	Mexico	
2021	Sofía Reyes	Mexico	
2022
2022	Kenia Os	Mexico	
2022	Danna Paola	Mexico	
2022	Kevin Kaarl	Mexico	
2022	Santa Fe Klan	Mexico	
2022	Natanael Cano	Mexico	
2023
2023	Kenia Os	Mexico	
2023	Danna Paola	Mexico	
2023	Kevin Kaarl	Mexico	
2023	Siddhartha	Mexico	
2023	Natanael Cano	Mexico	
2024
2024	Yeri Mua	Mexico	
2024	Danna	Mexico	
2024	El Malilla	Mexico	
2024	Gabito Ballesteros	Mexico	
2024	Natanael Cano	Mexico	

== See also ==
- MTV Video Music Award for Best Latin Artist
- MTV VMA International Viewer's Choice Award for MTV Latin America
- MTV VMA International Viewer's Choice Award for MTV Internacional
- Los Premios MTV Latinoamérica
  - Los Premios MTV Latinoamérica for Best Artist — North
