= La Venganza de los Ex VIP season 5 =

Fourth series of La Venganza de los Ex VIP

La Venganza de los Ex VIP
- Season 5
- No. of episodes: 13

Release
- Original network: Paramount+
- Original release: February 10, 2026 – 28 April 2026

Season chronology
- ← Previous; VIP 4

The fifth season of La vengaza de los ex VIP, a Mexican television series from Paramount+, premiered on February 10, 2026. The series was confirmed on January 5, 2026. Filming took place between September and October 2025, in the same villa as previous seasons, on Isla Barú, Colombia.

It includes the first transgender participant, Cami Pulgarín (formerly known as Juan Camilo Pulgarín), who was part of the first VIP season still using his birth name.

== Cast ==
The official cast list was released on January 9, 2026, and includes ten reality TV and social media celebrities: Abel Robles, Cami Pulgarín, Henry Jimenez, Joako Fabrega, Ignacia Michelson, Michel Chavez, Pedro Figueira, Roberto Mora, Rodolfo González, Ximena Nazor and Yesenia Canales.

The singles gathered for a beach party, Pulgarín and Mora participated in the first season, Figueira participated in the second season, while Canales was part of the fourth season. During the second episode, Rodel's ex, Janice, arrived at the villa. Asaf, from the third season, arrived at the beach in the third episode as Yesenia's ex. In the fourth episode, all the inhabitants were sent to the beach, where Frida Urbina, from the first season, arrived as Abel's ex-partner, even though they are legally married. In the fifth episode, Eddie, a former participant of Acapulco Shore, arrived at the beach. Camila Khusrevi arrived at the beach as Roberto's ex. In the seventh episode, Diego Venegas, Ignacia's ex, showed up on a jet ski while the singles were at a beach party. In the eighth episode, Freyder, Pedro's ex, arrived.

During the ninth episode, Santiago and Aurora arrived at the beach, where they were greeted by Cami and Robbie, their respective ex-boyfriends. In the tenth episode, the "Tablet of Terror" sent Janice, Joakon, and Pedro to greet a supposed ex on the beach. Simultaneously, the remaining singles were instructed to vote on which of their number would leave the villa; as a result, Joakon and Pedro were sent home. In the eleventh episode, Rodrigo, Ximena's ex-boyfriend, arrived at the beach. While a party was being held at the villa in the twelfth episode, Xiomara, Santiago's ex-girlfriend, arrived; later, Sebastián, Freyder's ex-boyfriend, also arrived at the beach.

- **Bold** indicates original cast member; all other cast were brought into the series as an ex.

#Ep	Name	Age (Note: Age when first appearing on the show.)	From	Notability	Exes
13	**Abel Robles**	30	Mexico	Former Acapulco Shore cast member	Frida
13	**Cami Pulgarín** (Note: Cami Pulgarín is the first transgender participant, however she appeared with her birth name (Juan Camilo Pulgarín) in the first VIP season, before her sex change.)	29	Colombia	Internet personality	Tiago
13	**Henry Jimenez**	28	Mexico	Photographer	Pedro
10	**Joako Fabrega**	31	Panama	Singer and Internet personality	—N/a
13	**Ignacia "Nacha" Michelson**	32	Chile	Reality television star	Diego
13	**Michel "It's Michhh" Chávez**	24	Mexico	Internet personality	Eduardo
10	**Pedro "La Divaza" Figueira**	27	Venezuela	YouTuber	Freyder, Henry
13	**Roberto "Robbie" Mora**	31	Mexico	Reality television star	Camila, Aurora
13	**Rodolfo "Rodel" González**	27	Mexico	Reto 4 elementos contestant^{es}	Janice
13	**Ximena Nazor**	23	Mexico	Internet personality	Rodrigo
13	**Yesenia Canales**	28	Mexico	La Venganza de los Ex VIP star	Asaf
12	Janice Betancurt	36	Puerto Rico	Reality television star	Rodolfo
11	Asaf Torres		Puerto Rico	Reality television star	Yesenia
10	Frida Urbina	30	Mexico	Actress	Abel
9	Eduardo "Eddie" Schobert	31	Mexico	Former Acapulco Shore cast member	Michel
8	Camila Khusrevi	24	Argentina	—N/a	Roberto
7	Diego Venegas	21	Chile	Mundos Opuestos 3 contestant	Ignacia
6	Freyder Cantillo	26	Colombia	Internet personality	Pedro, Sebastián
5	Santiago "Tiago" Uribe	21	Colombia	Internet personality	Cami, Xiomara
5	Aurora Sogo	28	Mexico	—N/a	Roberto
3	Rodrigo Villegas	28	Venezuela	—N/a	Ximena
2	Xiomara Vélez		Colombia	—N/a	Santiago
2	Sebastián Reyes	25	Colombia	Internet personality	Freyder

=== Duration of cast ===
Cast members	Episodes												
Cast members	1	2	3	4	5	6	7	8	9	10	11	12	13
Abel													
Cami													
Henry													
Nacha													
La Divaza													
It's Michhh													
Joako													
Robbie													
Rodel													
Ximena													
Yesenia													
Janice													
Asaf													
Frida													
Eddie													
Camila													
Diego													
Freyder													
Tiago													
Aurora													
Rodrigo													
Xiomara													
Sebastián													

Key: = "Cast member" is featured in this episode
Key: = "Cast member" arrives on the beach
Key: = "Cast member" has an ex arrive on the beach
Key: = "Cast member" has two exes arrive on the beach
Key: = "Cast member" arrives on the beach and has an ex arrive during the same episode
Key: = "Cast member" leaves the beach
Key: = "Cast member" does not feature in this episode

== Episodes ==
No. overall	No. in season	Title	Original release date
50	1	"Episode 1"	10 February 2026
51	2	"Episode 2"	10 February 2026
52	3	"Episode 3"	17 February 2026
53	4	"Episode 4"	24 February 2026
54	5	"Episode 5"	3 March 2026
55	6	"Episode 6"	10 March 2026
56	7	"Episode 7"	17 March 2026
57	8	"Episode 8"	24 March 2026
58	9	"Episode 9"	31 March 2026
59	10	"Episode 10"	7 April 2026
60	11	"Episode 11"	14 April 2026
61	12	"Episode 12"	21 April 2026
62	13	"Episode 13"	28 April 2026
