= Kim Su-ji =

Kim Su-ji or Suji Kim (김수지) might refer to:

== Sports ==
- Kim Su-ji (golfer), South Korean golfer, born 1996
- Kim Su-ji (volleyball), South Korean volleyball player, born 1987
- Kim Su-ji (diver), South Korean diver, born 1998
- Kim Su-ji (curler), South Korean curler, born 1993

== Arts ==
- Suji Kwock Kim, Korean-American-British poet and playwright

== See also ==
- Suki Kim, Korean-American journalist and writer, born 1970
- Sujin Kim, South Korean social media influencer, born 1991
- Kim So-jin, South Korean actress, born 1979
