= La Venganza de los Ex VIP season 1 =

First series of La Venganza de los Ex VIP

La Venganza de los Ex VIP
- Season 1
- No. of episodes: 12

Release
- Original network: MTV
- Original release: 9 November – 16 December 2021

Season chronology
- Next → VIP 2

The first season of La Venganza de los Ex VIP began airing on 9 November 2021.

The filming of the program took place in August and September 2021 in Colombia during the COVID-19 pandemic, for which the cast had to remain in quarantine for ten days before entering, however the production was not affected due to that the format originally kept cast members without outside access.

== Cast ==
The official list of cast members was confirmed with a promotion and includes four five singles: Brandon Castañeda, Camilo Pulgarin (Now Cami Pulgarín), Esteban Martínez, Ian García, and Roberto Mor; as well as five single women: Aylin Criss, Daphne Monasterios, Frida Urbina, Kelly Medan and Kimberly Shantal.

All the bachelors arrived at the villa during the first episode and immediately the Tablet of Terror announced the arrival of their exes, shortly after Diana Zambrano, Ian's ex-girlfriend arrived at the beach, however this is also Brandon and Robert's ex. El Suavecito and Karen Saldaña arrived at the villa in the second episode, being the ex-boyfriends of Kimberly and Kelly respectively. During the third episode, Camilo's ex, David Segura, came to the villa. Michelle Lando and Ricky Arenal, Aylin's ex, arrived at the beach simultaneously in the fifth episode. In the sixth episode, Daniel Fraga, Frida's ex-boyfriend, arrives at the villa. Andrés Restrepo, Camilo's ex, arrived at the beach in the seventh episode. During the eighth episode, Daniel's ex, Mariana Ayala, arrived at the villa. The Brazilian Carolina de Lima came to the beach during the ninth episode as Esteban's ex. Daphne was expelled in the tenth episode for her aggressive behavior, then Ian's ex Juanita Alvis arrived at the village while he and Kim went on a date. The last ex to arrive at the villa was Helian Evans, Mariana's ex.

- **Bold** indicates original cast member; all other cast were brought into the series as an ex.

#Ep	Name	Age (Note: Age when first appearing on the show.)	From	Notability	Exes
12	**Aylin Criss**	22	Peru	Internet personality	Michelle, Ricky
12	**Brandon Castañeda**	20	Mexico	Reality television star	Diana
10	**Daphne Montesinos**	29	Mexico	Reality television star and actress	—N/a
12	**Esteban Martínez**	33	Spain	Gandía Shore and Super Shore star	Carolina
12	**Frida Urbina**	26	Mexico	Actress and Internet personality	Daniel
12	**Ian García**	28	Mexico	Model and presenter	Diana, Juanita
12	**Juan Camilo Pulgarin** (Note: Now Cami Pulgarín, after her sex change.)	25	Colombia	Tiktok star	Andres, David
12	**Kelly Medan**	22	Mexico	Influencer	Karen
12	**Kimberly "Kim" Shantal**	25	Mexico	Internet personality	Luis
12	**Roberto "Robbie" Mora**	27	Mexico	Model	Diana
12	Diana Zambrano	24	Mexico	—N/a	Brandon, Ian, Roberto
11	Luis "Suavecito" Guillén	23	Mexico	YouTuber	Kimberly
11	Karen Saldaña	26	Mexico	—N/a	Kelly
10	Christian David Segura	22	Mexico	—N/a	Juan Camilo
8	Michelle Lando	21	Paraguay	—N/a	Aylin
8	Ricky Arenal	19	Mexico	—N/a	Aylin
7	Daniel Fraga	24	Mexico	Tiktok star	Frida, Mariana
6	Andres Restrepo	20	Colombia	—N/a	Juan Camilo
5	Mariana Ayala	19	Mexico	—N/a	Daniel, Helian
4	Carolina Lima	27	Brazil	—N/a	Esteban
3	Juanita Alvis	19	Mexico	—N/a	Ian
2	Helian Evans	23	Mexico	—N/a	Mariana

== Future Appearances ==
After filming the show, Kimberly Shantal and Roberto Mora participated in the competition show MTV Resistiré in 2022. Kelly Medanie joins the ninth season of Acapulco Shore, and Roberto Mora joins in tenth season. Michelle Lando returned for the show's second season, again in the role of the ex.

Brandon Castañeda, Kimberly Shantal, Luis Guillén and Michelle Lando participated in the first season of Los 50 in 2023. Diana Zambrano and Brandon Castañeda returned for the third season VIP, in the roles of bachelorette and ex respectively.

In 2024, Roberto Mora entered La casa de los famosos, and after being eliminated, he filmed the second season of Los 50, where he was proclaimed the winner. Diana Zambrano competed as a duo alongside her sister Brenda Zambrano (from the first season of civiles) in Abandonados, Asia: La Ruta del Dragón^{(es)}, the Mexican version of The Amazing Race. Brandon Castañeda competed on La Isla 2024: Desafío Grecia y Turquía^{(es)}.

In 2025, Kimberly Shantal and Luis Guillen returned to the fourth season VIP. Kimberly also participated in the second season of Tentados por la fortuna. Frida Urbina participated in Survivor Mexico: Heroes Vs Villains^{(es)}. Shantal participated in La Granja VIP, finishing in fourth place.

Frida Urbina, Cami Pulgarín (formerly known as Juan Camilo Pulgarín) and Roberto Mora returned for the fifth season VIP.

== Duration of cast ==
Cast members	Episodes											
Cast members	1	2	3	4	5	6	7	8	9	10	11	12
Aylin												
Brandon												
Camilo (Note: Juan Camilo is mostly attributed his middle name at birth, however on some occasions he is credited as María José, a character for which he is recognized on social networks.)												
Daphne												
Esteban												
Frida												
Ian												
Kelly												
Kim												
Robbie												
Diana												
Suavecito												
Karen												
David												
Michelle												
Ricky												
Daniel												
Andres												
Mariana												
Carolina												
Juanita												
Helian												

Key: = "Cast member" is featured in this episode
Key: = "Cast member" arrives on the beach
Key: = "Cast member" has an ex arrive on the beach
Key: = "Cast member" has two exes arrive on the beach
Key: = "Cast member" arrives on the beach and has an ex arrive during the same episode
Key: = "Cast member" leaves the beach
Key: = "Cast member" does not feature in this episode

== Episodes ==
No. overall	No. in season	Title	Original release date
1	1	"Episode 1"	9 November 2021
2	2	"Episode 2"	11 November 2021
3	3	"Episode 3"	16 November 2021
4	4	"Episode 4"	18 November 2021
5	5	"Episode 5"	23 November 2021
6	6	"Episode 6"	26 November 2021
7	7	"Episode 7"	30 November 2021
8	8	"Episode 8"	2 December 2021
9	9	"Episode 9"	7 December 2021
10	10	"Episode 10"	9 December 2021
11	11	"Episode 11"	14 December 2021
12	12	"Episode 12"	16 December 2021
