= Roast Yourself =

Roast Yourself may refer to:

- "Roast Yourself", a 2017 song by La Divaza
- "Roast Yourself", a 2018 song by Gabbie Hanna
- "Roast Yourself", a 2019 song by Fede Vigevani
