= La Granja VIP (Mexican TV series) season 1 =

La Granja VIP
- Season 1
- Hosted by: Adal Ramones
- No. of days: 71
- No. of contestants: 16
- Winner: Alfredo Adame
- Runner-up: Eleazar Gómez
- No. of episodes: 61

Release
- Original network: Azteca Uno
- Original release: 12 October – 21 December 2025

Season chronology
- Next → Season 2

The first season of the Mexican reality television series La Granja VIP premiered on Azteca Uno on 12 October 2025. The show follows a group of celebrities who live together on a farm with no communication with the outside world as they compete to win the cash grand prize. They must complete the daily tasks of a typical farmer while being continuously monitored during their stay by live television cameras.

The season concluded on 21 December 2025, after 71 days of competition with Alfredo Adame being crowned the winner, and Eleazar Gómez the runner-up.

== Format ==
The season follows a group of 16 celebrities, known as Farmers, living together on a farm and isolated from the outside world. The celebrities work as normal farmers, caring for animals, milking cows, planting and harvesting food, cleaning stables, and carrying firewood. Every day, the farmers face competitions and activities such as the Foreman competition, The Duel, Assembly Wednesday, the Salvation competition, and Betrayal Friday. Each week, the audience have the opportunity to vote to decide who leaves the farm, until the winner is chosen.

== Contestants ==
Name	Age	Notability	Result	Ref
Alfredo Adame	67	TV host, actor & producer	Winner; Day 71	
Eleazar Gómez	39	Actor	Runner-up; Day 71	
César Doroteo	36	Influencer	3rd Place; Day 71	
Kim Shantal	29	Influencer	4th Place; Day 71	
Tania González "La Bea"	33	Comedian	5th Place; Day 71	
Alberto Del Rio	48	Professional wrestler	Eliminated; Day 69	
Sergio Mayer Mori	27	Actor	Eliminated; Day 64	
Fabiola Campomanes	53	Actress	Eliminated; Day 57	
Lis Vega	47	Actress	Eliminated; Day 50	
Enrique "Kike" Mayagoitia	39	Model & TV host	Eliminated; Day 43	
Manola Diez	51	Actress	Eliminated; Day 36	
Luis "Jawy" Méndez	37	Reality TV star	Eliminated; Day 29	
Lola Cortés	54	Singer & actress	Walked; Day 29	
Omar Maldonado "Omahi"	30	Internet personality	Eliminated; Day 22	
Sandra Itzel	31	Singer & actress	Eliminated; Day 15	
Carolina Ross	30	Singer	Eliminated; Day 8	

== Voting history ==
	Week 1	Week 2	Week 3	Week 4	Week 5	Week 6	Week 7	Week 8	Week 9	Week 10		
	Week 1	Week 2	Week 3	Week 4	Week 5	Week 6	Week 7	Week 8	Week 9	Day 69	Finale	
Foreman	Sergio	Sergio	Bea	Sergio	Kike	Fabiola	César	Alberto	Alfredo	None		
Nomination (Eliminated farmer)	none	Eleazar	Lis	Lola	Eleazar	Kim	Fabiola	Fabiola	None			
Duel winner	Alberto	César	Jawy	César	Alfredo	Kike	Alfredo	Kim	Eleazar (1); Kim (2)	Kim (1); Alfredo (2)	None	
Nomination (Duel)	Alfredo	Lis	Sergio	Alberto	Lis	Alberto	Kim	César	Sergio (1); Eleazar (2)	Bea (1); César (2)	None	
Nomination (Farmers)	Eleazar; Bea	Sandra; Alberto	Manola; Eleazar	Eleazar; Alfredo	Manola; Sergio	Sergio; Alfredo	Alberto; Lis	Kim; Alfredo	Kim; César	Alberto; Eleazar	None	
Nomination (Betrayal)	Carolina	Alfredo	Kike; Omahi	Jawy	Alfredo; César	Eleazar; César	Alfredo; Sergio	Sergio; Bea	César	None		
Alfredo	Omahi	Fabiola	Manola	César	Fabiola	César; Sergio	Sergio; Lis	Eleazar; Kim	Kim; Bea	Alberto; Bea	Winner (Day 71)	
Eleazar	Bea	Sandra	Manola	Kike	Fabiola	César; Sergio	Alberto; Lis	Alfredo; Kim	César; Kim	~~Alberto~~; Bea; César	Runner-up (Day 71)	
César	Eleazar	Omahi	Eleazar	Eleazar	Manola	Alfredo; Sergio	Alberto; Lis	Alfredo; Kim	Bea; Kim	Alfredo; ~~Eleazar~~; Alberto	Third place (Day 71)	
Kim	Eleazar	Kike	Eleazar	Eleazar	Sergio	Alfredo; Sergio	Alberto; Lis	Alfredo; Bea	César; Bea	~~Alfredo~~; Eleazar	Fourth place (Day 71)	
Bea	Eleazar	Alberto	Manola	Eleazar	Manola	Alfredo; Sergio	Alberto; Lis	Alfredo; Kim	César; Kim	~~Alfredo~~; Eleazar; Alberto	Fifth place (Day 71)	
Alberto	Bea	Alfredo	Manola	Alfredo	Manola; Sergio	Alfredo; Sergio	Sergio; Alfredo	Alfredo; Kim	César; Kim	~~Alfredo~~; Eleazar	Eliminated (Day 69)	
Sergio	Manola	Lola	Manola	Eleazar	~~Manola~~; Alfredo	Alfredo; Lis	Alberto; Alfredo	Eleazar; Kim	Kim; César	Eliminated (Day 64)		
Fabiola	Kike	Alfredo	Manola	Manola	Manola	Alfredo; Sergio	Sergio; Eleazar	Eleazar; Kim	Eliminated (Day 57)			
Lis	Manola	Sandra	Manola	Alfredo	Manola	Alfredo; Sergio	Sergio; Alfredo	Eliminated (Day 50)				
Kike	Bea	Kim	Manola	Eleazar	Sergio	Alfredo; Sergio	Eliminated (Day 43)					
Manola	Omahi	Sandra	Eleazar	Alfredo	Fabiola	Eliminated (Day 36)						
Jawy	Bea	Sandra	Eleazar	Eleazar	Eliminated (Day 29)							
Lola	Fabiola	Alberto	Omahi	Alfredo	Walked (Day 29)							
Omahi	Manola	Alfredo	Manola	Eliminated (Day 22)								
Sandra	Eleazar	Jawy	Eliminated (Day 15)									
Carolina	Eleazar	Eliminated (Day 8)										
Notes	1	2	3	4	5, 6, 7, 8	9	none		10, 11, 12	13, 14, 15		
Nominated	César; Alfredo; Eleazar; Bea	Eleazar; Lis; Sandra; Alberto	Lis; Sergio; Manola; Eleazar	Lola; Alberto; Eleazar; Alfredo; Manola	Eleazar; Lis; Manola; Sergio	Kim; Alberto; Sergio; Alfredo; Kike	Fabiola; Kim; Alberto; Lis	Fabiola; César; Kim; Alfredo	Alberto; Sergio; Eleazar; Kim	Alberto; Eleazar; Bea; César	None	
Salvation	Eleazar	Alberto	Sergio	Eleazar	Sergio	Sergio	Kim	Kim	Kim	César	None	
Salvation by betrayal	Alfredo	Lis	Manola	Manola	Lis	Alberto	Alberto	Alfredo	Alberto	None		
Against public vote	César; Bea; Carolina	Eleazar; Sandra; Alfredo	Lis; Eleazar; Kike; Omahi	Lola; Alberto; Alfredo; Jawy	Eleazar; Manola; Alfredo; César	Kim; Alfredo; Kike; Eleazar; César	Fabiola; Lis; Alfredo; Sergio	Fabiola; César; Sergio; Bea	Sergio; Eleazar; César	Alberto; Eleazar; Bea	Alfredo; Bea; César; Eleazar; Kim	
Walked	None			Lola	None							
Eliminated	Carolina; Fewest votes to save	Sandra; Fewest votes to save	Omahi; Fewest votes to save	Jawy; Fewest votes to save	Manola; Fewest votes to save	Kike; Fewest votes to save	Lis; Fewest votes to save	Fabiola; Fewest votes to save	Sergio; Fewest votes to save	Alberto; Fewest votes to save	Bea; Fewest votes to win	Kim; Fewest votes to win
Eliminated	Carolina; Fewest votes to save	Sandra; Fewest votes to save	Omahi; Fewest votes to save	Jawy; Fewest votes to save	Manola; Fewest votes to save	Kike; Fewest votes to save	Lis; Fewest votes to save	Fabiola; Fewest votes to save	Sergio; Fewest votes to save	Alberto; Fewest votes to save	César; Fewest votes to win	Eleazar; Fewest votes to win
Eliminated	Carolina; Fewest votes to save	Sandra; Fewest votes to save	Omahi; Fewest votes to save	Jawy; Fewest votes to save	Manola; Fewest votes to save	Kike; Fewest votes to save	Lis; Fewest votes to save	Fabiola; Fewest votes to save	Sergio; Fewest votes to save	Alberto; Fewest votes to save	Alfredo; Most votes to win	

=== Notes ===
- ^Note 1: On Day 1, the public voted for their favorite farmer from three groups. Alberto, Sergio, and Lola were the winners of their respective groups. Of these three, Lola received the most votes and began a Chain of Salvation, where each farmer named one player to save from nomination. The chain ended with Manola nominating César for elimination.
- ^Note 2: On Day 11, Lis won the Golden Egg, which gave her the power to remove two nomination points from a nominated farmer of her choice. She chose Alfredo, leaving him with a single point and nominating Alberto in his place.
- ^Note 3: On Day 20, Adal informed Sergio that he could only nominate a farmer from the Stall as part of the Betrayal. This was a punishment because they broke several rules during week. Since Sergio did not want to choose between Kike and Omahi as the Betrayal nominee, the production team decided that both farmers would be nominated.
- ^Note 4: On Day 25, Fabiola won the Golden Egg, which gave her the power to nominate a fifth farmer. She nominated Manola.
- ^Note 5: On Day 29, Sergio was offered a sacrifice in exchange for receiving 2 nomination points. He accepted the offer.
- ^Note 6: In Week 6, the farmers were presented with the Nomination Roulette, which affected the nominations. The results of the spins were:
  - Alberto: extra vote, nominating Sergio
  - Alfredo, Bea, César, Eleazar, Fabiola, Kim: vote remained the same
  - Kike: double vote for Sergio
  - Lis: double vote for Manola
  - Manola: double vote for Fabiola
  - Sergio: swap his vote for another farmer
- ^Note 7: On Day 32, César won the Golden Egg, which gave him the power to give immunity to a farmer for the remainder of the week. He chose Fabiola.
- ^Note 8: In Week 6, the Double Betrayal was introduced. The betrayed farmer also has the opportunity to nominate another farmer, with the exception of a farmer who had been previously saved.
- ^Note 9: On Day 39, Lis won the Golden Egg, which gave her the power to nominate a fifth farmer. She nominated Kike.
- ^Note 10: On Day 57, Alberto was automatically nominated for elimination by production after he had had an altercation with Eleazar in previous days and attempted to physically assault him.
- ^Note 11: In Week 9, two duels were held. On Day 58, Eleazar won the first duel of the week, with Sergio being nominated. On Day 59, Kim won the second duel of the week, with Eleazar being nominated.
- ^Note 12: On Day 60, Sergio won the Golden Egg, which gave him the power to save one of the two farmers (Kim or César) nominated at the Assembly. He saved César.
- ^Note 13: In Week 10, the farmers were presented with the Nomination Roulette, which affected the nominations. The results of the spins were:
  - Alberto: swap his vote for Alfredo for another farmer; 1 vote for Bea
  - Alfredo:-1 vote for Alberto and Bea
  - Bea: swap her vote for Alfredo for another farmer; 1 vote for Alberto
  - César:-1 vote for Alfredo; swap his vote for Eleazar for another farmer
  - Eleazar: swap his vote for Alberto for another farmer; 1 vote for César
  - Kim: vote for Alfredo annulled; -1 vote for Eleazar
- ^Note 14: On Day 65, following a four-way tie between Alberto, Bea, César, and Eleazar, the final foreman, Alfredo, was able to select the two assembly nominees. He chose Alberto and Eleazar.
- ^Note 15: In Week 10, two duels were held. On Day 66, Kim won the first duel of the week, with Bea being nominated. On Day 67, Alfredo won the second duel of the week, with César being nominated.

== Episodes ==
No.	Title	Original release date	Mexico viewers (millions)
Week 1
1	"La gala #1"	12 October 2025	2.16
2	"El capataz #1"	13 October 2025	1.75
3	"El duelo #1"	14 October 2025	1.61
4	"La asamblea #1"	15 October 2025	1.77
5	"Salvación #1"	16 October 2025	1.75
6	"Traición #1"	17 October 2025	1.66
7	"La gala #2"	19 October 2025	1.70
Week 2
8	"El capataz #2"	20 October 2025	1.88
9	"El duelo #2"	21 October 2025	1.66
10	"La asamblea #2"	22 October 2025	1.74
11	"La salvación #2"	23 October 2025	1.70
12	"Traición #2"	24 October 2025	1.78
13	"La gala #3"	26 October 2025	2.05
Week 3
14	"El capataz #3"	27 October 2025	1.85
15	"El duelo #3"	28 October 2025	1.84
16	"La asamblea #3"	29 October 2025	1.89
17	"La salvación #3"	30 October 2025	1.80
18	"Traición #3"	31 October 2025	1.89
19	"La gala #4"	2 November 2025	2.08
Week 4
20	"El capataz #4"	3 November 2025	1.82
21	"El duelo #4"	4 November 2025	1.87
22	"La asamblea #4"	5 November 2025	1.84
23	"La salvación #4"	6 November 2025	1.85
24	"Traición #4"	7 November 2025	1.87
25	"La gala #5"	9 November 2025	2.14
Week 5
26	"El capataz #5"	10 November 2025	1.87
27	"El duelo #5"	11 November 2025	1.86
28	"La asamblea #5"	12 November 2025	1.80
29	"La salvación #5"	13 November 2025	1.88
30	"Traición #5"	14 November 2025	1.80
31	"La gala #6"	16 November 2025	2.03
Week 6
32	"El capataz #6"	17 November 2025	1.87
33	"El duelo #6"	18 November 2025	1.82
34	"La asamblea #6"	19 November 2025	1.86
35	"La salvación #6"	20 November 2025	1.82
36	"Traición #6"	21 November 2025	1.89
37	"La gala #7"	23 November 2025	2.04
Week 7
38	"El capataz #7"	24 November 2025	1.88
39	"El duelo #7"	25 November 2025	1.83
40	"La asamblea #7"	26 November 2025	1.86
41	"La salvación #7"	27 November 2025	1.82
42	"Traición #7"	28 November 2025	1.88
43	"La gala #8"	30 November 2025	2.15
Week 8
44	"El capataz #8"	1 December 2025	1.88
45	"El duelo #8"	2 December 2025	1.83
46	"La asamblea #8"	3 December 2025	1.86
47	"La salvación #8"	4 December 2025	1.88
48	"Traición #8"	5 December 2025	1.82
49	"La gala #9"	7 December 2025	2.13
Week 9
50	"El capataz #9"	8 December 2025	N/A
51	"El duelo #9"	9 December 2025	1.82
52	"La asamblea #9"	10 December 2025	1.88
53	"La salvación #9"	11 December 2025	1.75
54	"Traición #9"	12 December 2025	1.83
55	"La gala #10"	14 December 2025	1.95
Week 10
56	"La asamblea #10"	15 December 2025	1.84
57	"El duelo #10"	16 December 2025	1.89
58	"El duelo #11"	17 December 2025	1.87
59	"La salvación #10"	18 December 2025	N/A
60	"Traición #10"	19 December 2025	N/A
61	"La gala #11"	21 December 2025	N/A
