= La Venganza de los Ex VIP season 4 =

Fourth series of La Venganza de los Ex VIP

La Venganza de los Ex VIP
- Season 4
- No. of episodes: 13

Release
- Original network: MTV; Paramount+
- Original release: 18 March – 3 June 2025

Season chronology
- ← Previous; VIP 3 Next → VIP 5

The fourth season of La Venganza de los Ex VIP, a Mexican television series from MTV and Paramount, premiered on March 18, 2025. It documents a group of singles (social media and civic media celebrities) enjoying a vacation while competing one-on-one with their exes in each episode.

== Cast ==
On February 19, 2025, Paramount released a video showing the main cast members. Luis Guillén (from the first season), Ana Cisneros, Kimberly Shantal and Yurgenis Aular returned to the program.

In the first episode, the singles met in the villa during a night out. Adrán Andrés, Dennis's ex, appeared on the scene. Ken and Yurgenis (from the second season) arrived at the villa during the second episode, but on different occasions. Ana (from the second season) arrived in the third episode as Crystal's ex. Yurgenis's ex, Simone, arrived at the villa in the third episode. Kim Shantal, who participated in the first season, returned as Suavecito's ex and immediately argued with Jacky and Ana, who were dating Suavecito. Konrad arrived at the villa as Dennis and La Jose's ex. In the seventh episode, the entire cast attended a beach party. There, the terror tablet ordered Dennis to send one of her two ex-boyfriends home, forcing Adrián Andrés to leave the villa. Upon returning home, Fernanda's ex, Roger, welcomed them. In episode eight, Diego Castellanos and Melisa Ruiz arrived at the beach, as Ana and Samantha's exes. In the ninth episode, Roger voluntarily left the show after an altercation with several cast members. That same morning, Ana was evicted after a massive vote. Later, Yesenia, Irving's ex, arrived at the beach. Santiago arrived at the beach in the eleventh episode as Yesenia's ex. In the twelfth episode, while Konrad and Dennis were celebrating their engagement, Dennis's ex, Farley, arrived at the villa.

- **Bold** indicates original cast member; all other cast were brought into the series as an ex.

Ep	Name	Age (Note: Age when first appearing on the show.)	From	Notability	Exes
13	**Claudia Ariz**	21	Mexico	Former Acapulco Shore cast member	Ana
13	**Crystal Meza**	28	Mexico	DJ	César
13	**Dennis Arana**	26	Guatemala	La Academia contestant	Adrián, Konrad, Farley
13	**Fernanda Arriella**	22	Mexico	Podcaster	Roger
13	**Irvin Villatoro**	28	Mexico	Exatlón Mexico contestant	Yesenia
13	**Jacky Ramírez**	27	Mexico	Former Acapulco Shore cast member	—N/a
13	**Jose "La Jose" Santos**	30	Venezuela	Internet personality	Konrad
13	**Luis "Suavecito" Guillén**	29	Mexico	YouTuber	Kimberly
13	**Matías Ochoa**	26	Argentina	Combate Guatemala contestant	Yurgenis
13	**Samantha "Samii" Herrera**	31	Mexico	YouTuber	Diego
7	Adrián Andrés	30	Mexico	La Ley de la Selva contestant	Dennis
12	César "Ken" Díaz		Mexico	—N/a	Crystal
12	Yurgenis Aular	26	Venezuela	La Venganza de los Ex VIP star	Matías, Simone
7	Ana Cisneros		Mexico	La Venganza de los Ex VIP star	Claudia, Melisa
10	Simone Coppola	29	Italy	Temptation Island Spain star	Yurgenis
9	Kimberly "Kim" Shantal	29	Mexico	Reality television star	Luis
8	Konrad Montero	27	Venezuela	—N/a	Dennis, Jose
3	Roger Guerra		Mexico	—N/a	Fernanda
6	Diego Castellanos		Mexico	Soccer player	Samantha
6	Melisa Ruiz	22	Mexico	—N/a	Ana
5	Yesenia Canales		Mexico	—N/a	Irvin, Santiago
3	Santiago Santana		Mexico	Former Acapulco Shore cast member	Yesenia
2	Farley Ortiz	29	Venezuela	—N/a	Dennis

=== Duration of cast ===
Cast members	Episodes												
Cast members	1	2	3	4	5	6	7	8	9	10	11	12	13
Claudia													
Crystal													
Dennis													
Fernanda													
Irvin													
Jacky													
La Jose													
Suavecito													
Matías													
Samii													
Adrián Andrés													
Ken													
Yurgenis													
Ana													
Simone													
Kim													
Konrad													
Roger													
Diego													
Melisa													
Yesenia													
Santiago													
Farley													

Key: = "Cast member" is featured in this episode
Key: = "Cast member" arrives on the beach
Key: = "Cast member" has an ex arrive on the beach
Key: = "Cast member" has two exes arrive on the beach
Key: = "Cast member" arrives on the beach and has an ex arrive during the same episode
Key: = "Cast member" leaves the beach
Key: = "Cast member" does not feature in this episode

== Episodes ==
No. overall	No. in season	Title	Original release date
37	1	"Episode 1"	18 March 2025
38	2	"Episode 2"	18 March 2025
39	3	"Episode 3"	25 March 2025
40	4	"Episode 4"	1 April 2025
41	5	"Episode 5"	8 April 2025
42	6	"Episode 6"	15 April 2025
43	7	"Episode 7"	22 April 2025
44	8	"Episode 8"	29 April 2025
45	9	"Episode 9"	6 May 2025
46	10	"Episode 10"	13 May 2025
47	11	"Episode 11"	20 May 2025
48	12	"Episode 12"	27 May 2025
49	13	"Episode 13"	3 June 2025
