= Humbe (singer) =

Mexican singer and songwriter (born 2000)

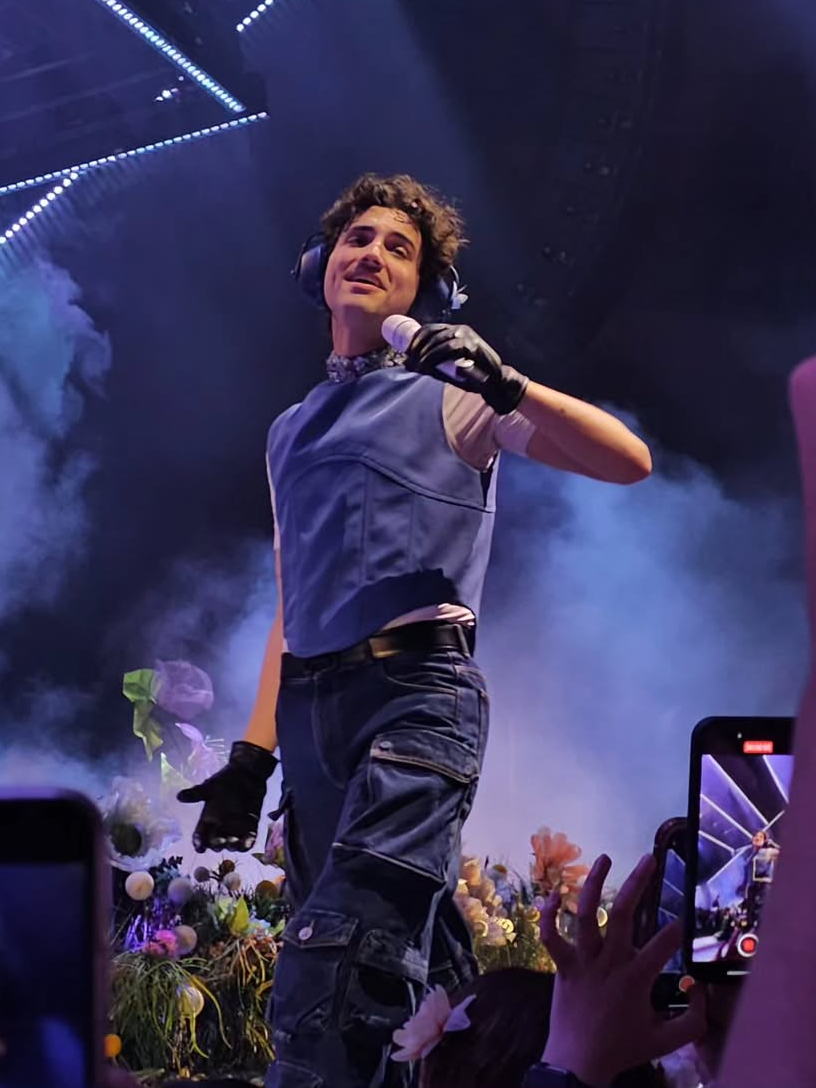
- Humbe in 2024

Background information
- Born: Humberto Rodríguez Terrazas; 11 November 2000 (age 25); Monterrey, Nuevo León, Mexico
- Genres: Latin pop; contemporary R&B; alternative pop; pop urbano
- Occupations: Singer; songwriter; record producer
- Instruments: Vocals; piano; guitar; ukulele
- Years active: 2017–present
- Labels: Sony Mexico; PARASIEMPRE.wav
- Website: humbe.co

Humberto Rodríguez Terrazas (Note: In this Mexican name, the surname is Rodríguez and the second or maternal family name is Terrazas.) (born 11 November 2000), known professionally as Humbe (Spanish pronunciation: [ˈumβe]), is a Mexican singer-songwriter. He first gained attention through self-released music, leading to his signing with Sony Music Mexico in 2021. That year, he released the albums Entropía and Aurora, earning a nomination for the Latin Grammy Award for Best New Artist at the 22nd ceremony.

In 2023, he released his fourth album, Esencia, supported by the Esencia Tour, which sold out venues across Mexico. After leaving Sony, he independently released his fifth album, Armagedón, in 2024. That same year, Humbe was named by Rolling Stone en Español as one of its 25 artists that define the future of music. By November 2025, he had accumulated more than 2.14 million album-equivalent units as certified by AMPROFON.

== Life and career ==
=== 2000–2019: Early life and career beginnings ===
Humberto Rodríguez Terrazas was born on 11 November 2000 in Monterrey, Nuevo León, and spent part of his childhood between Chihuahua City and Monterrey. At the age of nine, he developed an interest in music and began learning to play the piano at his father's encouragement. He also plays guitar and ukelele. This experience led him to perform a song by Journey, further strengthening his passion for music. Influenced by rock bands such as Aerosmith and Journey, as well as Mexican pop groups including Reik and Camila, he began songwriting his own songs and experimenting with various genres.

In 2017, he self-released his debut studio album, Sonámbulo, which features thirteen tracks and marked his formal entry into the music industry. That same year, he received the "Youth Revelation Award" from the Plaza de las Estrellas Cultural Foundation in Mexico City. He performed at the Billboard Latin Music Showcase in Mexico City in November 2019.

=== 2020–2022: Breakthrough with Entropía and Aurora ===
Humbe continued his career by releasing another independent EP, Soy Humbe, on 21 May 2020. By early 2021, he signed a recording contract with Sony Music Mexico, and on 12 March released his second studio album, Entropía, through the label. Entirely written and produced by himself, the record combined elements of pop and R&B and earned him a nomination for Best New Artist at the 22nd Annual Latin Grammy Awards.

Its single "El Poeta" was certified gold in Mexico by AMPROFON. In July 2021, he received the Emerging Artist award at the 2021 MTV MIAW Awards. Later that year, on 11 November—coinciding with his 21st birthday—he released his third studio album, Aurora, which continued his introspective and emotional musical style. To promote his recent works, he embarked on the El Poeta Tour, which took place between June and December 2022.

=== 2023–2024: ESENCIA and ARMAGEDÓN ===
On 22 March 2023, Humbe released his fourth studio album, Esencia, comprising eleven tracks inspired by personal experiences and reflections on humility and self-love. In November 2023, he released the standalone single "Fantasmas", conceived as a tribute to the Day of the Dead. That same month, he attended the inaugural edition of the Rolling Stone en Español Awards, where he performed "Cómo Respirar?", a song from Aurora. Later in 2023, he collaborated with the indie pop group Latin Mafia on the single "Patadas de Ahogado".

In 2024, he released "Kintsugi", a single inspired by the namesake Japanese art, and launched his sold-out Esencia Tour on 15 March 2024, performing across Mexico, Peru, Colombia, Guatemala, and Argentina. In June, he released "Malbec" in collaboration with Reik. The Esencia Tour concluded on 28 November 2024, coinciding with the release of his fifth studio album, Armagedón, his first independent record following his departure from Sony Music. The album explores sensual and conceptual themes centered on an "intergalactic travel within a relationship" and was listed by Rolling Stone en Español among the best Spanish-language albums of 2024. Humbe was named to the Rolling Stone en Español list of "25 Artists That Define the Future of Music".

=== 2025–present: Dueño del Cielo ===
On 1 April 2025, Humbe became an official ambassador for Cartier, and the following month attended the Met Gala after-party. On 30 July, he collaborated with Sebastián Yatra on the single "Templo de Piceas". On 27 November, he appeared on the cover of Mexico's Vogue Hombre for its December issue. On 30 November, he performed at the Palacio de los Deportes as part of a promotional event for his sixth album, Dueño del Cielo, which was released on 6 December. Its lead single, "Morfina", was released on 11 November. The album was ranked number 20 on Rolling Stone's list of the 50 best Latin and Spanish-language albums of 2025.

In 2026, Humbe embarked on the Dueño del Cielo Tour, his most extensive to date, featuring dates across Europe, Oceania, and Japan—the latter including a performance at the Summer Sonic Festival. He performed "Morfina" at the Grammy Museum's Clive Davis Theater in February, and in September, the song won Best Pop Song – New Generation at the 2026 Premios Juventud.

== Discography ==
=== Studio albums ===
- Sonámbulo (2017)
- Entropía (2021)
- Aurora (2021)
- Esencia (2023)
- Armagedón (2024)
- Dueño del Cielo (2025)

=== Extended plays ===
- Soy Humbe (2020)

== Tours ==
- El Poeta Tour (2022)
- Esencia Tour (2024)
- Dueño del Cielo Tour (2026)

== Awards and nominations ==
Name of the award ceremony, year presented, nominee(s) of the award, award category, and the result of the nomination
| Award ceremony | Year | Category | Nominee(s)/work(s) | Result | Ref. |
|---|---|---|---|---|---|
| Éxito SACM | 2025 | Independent Hit | "Fantasmas" | Won | |
| Latin Grammy Awards | 2021 | Best New Artist | Humbe | Nominated | |
| Lo Nuestro Awards | 2023 | Male Breakthrough Artist | Humbe | Nominated | |
| MTV Europe Music Awards | 2021 | Best Latin America North Act | Humbe | Nominated | |
| MTV MIAW Awards | 2021 | Emerging Artist | Humbe | Won | |
| MTV MIAW Awards | 2022 | Styler of the Year | Humbe | Nominated | |
| MTV MIAW Awards | 2024 | Pop Explosion of the Year | Humbe | Nominated | |
| MTV MIAW Awards | 2024 | Viral Anthem | "Patadas de Ahogado" | Nominated | |
| MTV MIAW Awards | 2024 | Collaboration of the Year | "Patadas de Ahogado" | Nominated | |
| Nickelodeon Mexico Kids' Choice Awards | 2021 | New Artist | Humbe | Won | |
| Premios Juventud | 2026 | Best Pop Song – New Generation | "Morfina" | Won | |
| ZYN Rolling Stone en Español Awards | 2023 | Promising Artist of the Year | Humbe | Nominated | |
| ZYN Rolling Stone en Español Awards | 2023 | Public's Choice | Humbe | Nominated | |
| ZYN Rolling Stone en Español Awards | 2026 | Singer-Songwriter Album of the Year | Dueño del Cielo | Pending | |
| ZYN Rolling Stone en Español Awards | 2026 | Public's Choice | Dueño del Cielo Tour | Pending | |
