= Chupón =

Single by Yeri Mua, El Gudi, Jey F, Alan Dazmel, and Oviña
- Language: Spanish
- Released: August 26, 2023
- Genre: Latin urban
- Length: 3:27
- Label: Fullbrand Music
- Songwriters: Yeri Cruz Varela; Alan Morales; Alfredo Oviña; Diego Gudiño; Jean Franco de la Vega
- Producers: Alfredo Oviña; Edgar Pioquinto

Yeri Mua singles chronology
"Chupón" (2023)	"Con To" (2023)

Music video
- "Chupón" on YouTube

"Chupón" (lit. 'sucker') is the debut single by Mexican singer Yeri Mua, featuring singers El Gudi, Jey F, Alan Dazmel, and Oviña. The song was released on August 26, 2023. Mua co-wrote the song with El Gudi, Jey F, Alan Dazmel, and its producer, Oviña.

Chupón is Mua's biggest hit, with over 108 million views on YouTube and 75 million streams on Spotify.

== Background and promotion ==
In July 2023, Mua announced that she would be making her singing debut, in collaboration with her friends. In early August 2023, she posted hints on her social media where she posted fragments where the song "Yeri Mua, the one who brings the chakales from behind" could be heard. Finally, in August, she released the song "Chupón" on YouTube, Apple Music, and Spotify after it was leaked on social media. The song was well and poorly received by critics.

In September 2023, Mua announced the Chupón Tour in Mexico in promotion of her debut singe among other songs along with El Gudi, Jey F and Alán Dazmel.

== Awards and nominations ==
Nominations for Chupón
Year	Award	Category	Result	Ref.
2023	Socialteen Awards	Viral Hit of the Year	Nominated	

== Certifications ==
Region	Certification	Certified units/sales
Mexico (AMPROFON)	Gold	70,000^{‡}
^{‡} Sales+streaming figures based on certification alone.
