= 2018 MTV MIAW Awards =

Annual Latin American music awards 2018

MTV MIAW Awards 2018
- Date: June 3, 2018
- Location: Palacio de los Deportes, Mexico City
- Website: miaw.mtvla.com

Television/radio coverage
- Network: MTV Latin America
- Produced by: MTVla

The 5th Annual MTV MIAW Awards were held on June 2, 2018 at the Palacio de los Deportes in Mexico City, and was broadcast on June 3, 2018 through MTV Latin America. The awards celebrate the best of Latin music and the digital world of the millennial generation. The ceremony was hosted by Mon Laferte and La Divaza.

== Performances ==
- Anitta
- J Balvin
- Becky G
- Liam Payne
- Mon Laferte
- Sofía Reyes
- Jason Derulo
- De La Ghetto
- Natti Natasha
- Paty Cantú
- Jesse Baez
