= La Venganza de los Ex VIP season 3 =

Third series of La Venganza de los Ex VIP

La Venganza de los Ex VIP
- Season 3
- No. of episodes: 12

Release
- Original network: MTV
- Original release: 5 December 2023 – 20 February 2024

Series chronology
- ← Previous; VIP 2 Next → VIP 4

The third season of La Venganza de los Ex VIP, a Mexican television series from MTV and Paramount. It was originally scheduled to premiere in 2024 after being announced on November 3, 2023, during the Upfront 2024 event, where Paramount confirmed the show's release date via a content slate for 2024. However, the date was brought forward to December 5, 2023. It was filmed in September 2023 on an island in Cartagena, Colombia. It documents a group of singles (social and civic media celebrities) enjoying a vacation while in each episode they compete one-on-one with their ex-partners.

== Cast ==
The list of cast members was announced alongside the release date of November 8, 2023, including five men: Aldo Tamez De Nigris, Alex Flores, Asaf Torres, José Sánchez known as "Fraag" and Valentino Lázaro, and five women: Ana Ovalle, Diana Zambrano, Fernanda Moreno, Lilian Durán, and Daniela Buenrostro.

All the bachelors arrived at the villa on the first day. During the first psychedelic party, Beni Falcón, Fernanda's ex, arrived. In the second episode Brayan Varón arrived at the beach as Valentino's ex. Later, Asaf's ex, Valeria Salinas, arrived at the beach. During the third episode, Alejandro's ex, Kevin Achutegui, arrived at the beach. Later, Beni, Fernanda and Lilian went to the beach to meet a new ex, who arrived was Alba Zepeda, Fernanda's ex, however thanks to the "Tablet of Terror", Fernanda had to choose which of her two exes sent home, so Bení had to leave the program. Then everyone was sent to the "Tornado Room" where they had the opportunity to send one person home, Fernanda had the majority of votes, so she had to leave the program.

In the fifth episode, Lilian's ex, Salvador García, entered the villa. He later arrived at the beach of Fano, Ana's ex-boyfriend. Big Brother Argentina star Yasmila Mendeguía hit the beach in the sixth episode as Fragg's ex. During the next episode, Macedo, Diana's ex-boyfriend, arrived at the beach. In the eighth episode, during a date between Ana, Fano and Bryan, the latter's ex, Nina, arrived. Than the entire cast was sent to a beach party, where Cedric, Queen's ex, arrived. Daniela "Bebeshita" Barceló from Los 50, arrived at the beach as Macedo's ex in the ninth episode.

Delmy arrived at the beach in the tenth episode, as Kevin's ex. The next day, half of the cast was sent to a party on a boat, the other half who stayed in the villa had to vote to get one of the exes off the boat: as a result Cecrid and Macedo were sent home. Meanwhile, Brandon Castañeda from the first VIP season arrived at the villa (he is the ex-boyfriend of Bebeshita, Diana and Queen). During that night, Bebeshita and Queen, as well as Alejandro and Kevin, were involved in physical altercations; Then in episode eleven Bebeshita and Kevin were kicked out of the show. The last ex to arrive was Asaf's ex, Genesys Martinez, who was evicted the next morning after a physical altercation with Delmy.

- **Bold** indicates original cast member; all other cast were brought into the series as an ex.

#Ep	Name	Age (Note: Age when first appearing on the show.)	From	Notability	Exes
12	**Aldo Tamez De Nigris**	24	Mexico	Exatlón Estados Unidos 7 contestant	—N/a
12	**Alejandro "Alex" Flores**	26	Mexico	Internet personality	Kevin
12	**Ana Ovalle**	26	Venezuela	Internet personality	Fano
12	**Asaf Torres**	25	Puerto Rico	Reality television star	Valeria, Genesys
12	**Daniela "Queen" Buenrostro**	26	Mexico	Internet personality	Cédric, Brandon
12	**Diana Zambrano**	26	Mexico	La Venganza de los Ex VIP star	Bryan, Brandon
4	**Fernanda "Fershy" Moreno**	25	Mexico	Former Acapulco Shore cast member	Beni, Alba
12	**José "Fraag" Sánchez**	29	Spain	YouTuber	Yasmila
12	**Lilian Durán**	29	Mexico	Jugando con Fuego: Latino star	Salvador
12	**Valentino Lázaro**	27	Colombia	Internet personality	Brayan
4	Beni Falcón	29	Mexico	Former Acapulco Shore cast member	Fernanda
11	Brayan Varón		Colombia	—N/a	Valentino, Nina
11	Valeria Salinas		Colombia	—N/a	Asaf
9	Kevin Achutegui	25	Mexico	—N/a	Alejandro, Delmy
10	Alba Zepeda	28	Mexico	Former Acapulco Shore cast member	Fernanda
8	Salvador "Chava" García		Mexico	—N/a	Lilian
8	Fano	28	Mexico	Singer	Ana
7	Yasmila Mendeguía	26	Argentina	Gran Hermano 9 housmate	José
4	Bryan Macedo	25	Mexico	—N/a	Diana, Bebeshita
5	Nina	23	Colombia	—N/a	Brayan
3	Cédric Mejía		Mexico	—N/a	Queen
3	Daniela "Bebeshita" Barceló	32	Mexico	Reality television star	Bryan, Brandon
3	Delmy	27	Mexico	—N/a	Kevin
3	Brandon Castañeda	22	Mexico	Reality television star	Bebeshita, Diana, Queen
2	Genesys Martinez	27	Colombia	—N/a	Asaf

== Future Appearances ==
After filming, Daniela Barceló entered La casa de los famosos in 2024. Alba Zepeda and Fernanda Moreno competed on La Isla 2024: Desafío Grecia y Turquía.

In 2025 Beni Falcón was a castaway on Survivor Mexico^{(es)}. Aldo Tamez De Nigris joined La casa de los famosos Mexico, and emerged as the winner.

Valentino Lázaro entered La casa de los famosos Colombia in 2026. Daniela Barceló joins the second season of La Granja VIP Mexico.

=== Duration of cast ===
Cast members	Episodes											
Cast members	1	2	3	4	5	6	7	8	9	10	11	12
Aldo												
Alex												
Ana												
Asaf												
Diana												
Fershy												
Fraag												
Lilian												
Queen												
Valentino												
Beni												
Bryan												
Valeria												
Kevin												
Alba												
Shava												
Fano												
Yasmila												
Macedo												
Nina												
Cedric												
Bebeshita												
Delmy												
Brandon												
Genesys												

Key: = "Cast member" is featured in this episode
Key: = "Cast member" arrives on the beach
Key: = "Cast member" has an ex arrive on the beach
Key: = "Cast member" has two exes arrive on the beach
Key: = "Cast member" arrives on the beach and has an ex arrive during the same episode
Key: = "Cast member" leaves the beach
Key: = "Cast member" does not feature in this episode

== Episodes ==
No. overall	No. in season	Title	Original release date
25	1	"Episode 1"	5 December 2023
26	2	"Episode 2"	12 December 2023
27	3	"Episode 3"	19 December 2023
28	4	"Episode 4"	26 December 2023
29	5	"Episode 5"	2 January 2024
30	6	"Episode 6"	9 January 2024
31	7	"Episode 7"	16 January 2024
32	8	"Episode 8"	23 January 2024
33	9	"Episode 9"	30 January 2024
34	10	"Episode 10"	6 February 2024
35	11	"Episode 11"	13 February 2024
36	12	"Episode 12"	20 February 2024
