= El Bogueto =

Mexican rapper (born 1997)

- Also known as: B.O.G.
- Born: Armando Antonio Toledo Rosas; 27 December 1997 (age 28); Nezahualcóyotl, State of Mexico, Mexico
- Genre: Reggaeton
- Occupations: Rapper; singer; songwriter; musician
- Instrument: Vocals

Armando Antonio Toledo Rosas (born 27 December 1997), known professionally as El Bogueto, is a Mexican reggaeton rapper, singer and songwriter. He has positioned himself as one of the most popular reggaeton artists in Mexico.

== Early life ==
Armando Antonio Toledo Rosas was born on 27 December 1997 in Nezahualcóyotl. Prior to his musical debut, El Bogueto explored various academic options, including degrees in law, investigative police, and business administration, before finally giving up and choosing to dedicate himself to music.

== Career ==
During the COVID-19 pandemic, Candela Music, Uzielito Mix's record label, adopted El Bogueto, and for three years he attempted to produce R&B, trap, and commercial reggaeton, but it didn't work out. At the time, he went by the name B.O.G. (pronounced in English), but decided to change it because people had trouble pronouncing it. El Bogueto has collaborated with artists such as Big Metra, Mujer Luna Bella, Dani Flow, El Malilla, Yeri Mua, and Bellakath and has performed on national stages such as the Coca-Cola Flow Fest in 2023 and 2024 and the MEXCLA Spotify also in 2024. Furthermore, in December 2024, along with Uzielito Mix, he participated in the halftime show of the semifinal between Cruz Azul and Club América.

== Artistry ==
=== Musical style ===
El Bogueto's musical style is called Mexican reggaeton, in which, according to Eme Malafe, he described it as "born from the neighborhoods, places where it authentically emerges. This music is more than a genre; It is a representation of their environment and the experiences they live, something with which the public can deeply identify".

=== Influences ===
El Bogueto was influenced by Almighty, Héctor & Tito, Daddy Yankee, Tego Calderón, Don Omar, Nicky Jam and Plan B in his career.

== Discography ==
- Reggaetoñerito (2023)
- No hay loco que no corone (2024)
