= La Granja VIP (Mexican TV series) season 2 =

La Granja VIP
- Season 2
- Hosted by: Adal Ramones
- No. of contestants: 20
- No. of episodes: 65

Release
- Original network: Azteca Uno
- Original release: 6 September 2026 – present

Season chronology
- ← Previous; Season 1

The second season of the Mexican reality television series La Granja VIP premiered on Azteca Uno on 6 September 2026. The show follows a group of celebrities who live together on a farm with no communication with the outside world as they compete to win the cash grand prize. They must complete the daily tasks of a typical farmer while being continuously monitored during their stay by live television cameras.

The season was announced on 21 December 2025. Adal Ramones returned as host. Linet Puente, Flor Rubio, Ferka and Rey Grupero returned to the panel of critics.

== Format ==
The season follows a group of celebrities, known as Farmers, living together on a farm and isolated from the outside world. The celebrities work as normal farmers, caring for animals, milking cows, planting and harvesting food, cleaning stables, and carrying firewood. Every day, the farmers face competitions and activities such as the Foreman competition, The Duel, Assembly Wednesday, the Salvation competition, and Betrayal Friday. Each week, the audience have the opportunity to vote to decide who leaves the farm, until the winner is chosen.

== Contestants ==
Name	Age	Notability	Day entered	Day exited	Status	Ref
Daniela "Bebeshita" Alexis	35	Influencer	1		Participating	
Guillermo Kunno	26	Influencer	1		Participating	
Ivonne Montero	52	Actress	1		Participating	
Julio Camejo	55	Actor	1		Participating	
Kevyn Contreras	30	Comedian	1		Participating	
Manelyk González	37	Reality TV star	1		Participating	
Mario "Mono" Osuna	38	Professional footballer	1		Participating	
Niurka Marcos	58	Actress & TV personality	1		Participating	
Rafael Mercadante	53	TV personality	1	71	Eliminated	
Fernando Lozada	37	Reality TV star	1	64	Eliminated	
Natalia Alcocer	37	TV personality	1	64	Walked	
Pablo Montero	52	Singer and actor	15	57	Eliminated	
Azalia Ojeda	53	TV personality	1	50	Eliminated	
Pimpinela Escarlata	57	Professional wrestler	1	43	Eliminated	
Mónica Escobedo	47	Comedian	1	43	Expelled	
Pascal Nadaud	36	Professional rugby player	1	36	Eliminated	
Kenny Avilés	71	Singer	1	29	Eliminated	
Carlos Trejo	63	Paranormal investigator	1	22	Eliminated	
María Karunna	52	Singer	1	15	Eliminated	
Abigail Pak "La Coreañera"	22	Musician	1	8	Eliminated	

== Voting history ==
	Week 1	Week 2	Week 3	Week 4	Week 5	Week 6	Week 7	Week 8	Week 9	Week 10	Week 11	Week 12	Week 13	Week 14	Week 15
Foreman	Julio	Pascal	Mono	Mono	Kunno	Pablo	Julio	Bebeshita	Rafael	Manelyk	Julio				
Nomination (Eliminated farmer)	none	Manelyk	Manelyk	Bebeshita; Julio	Pimpinela	Kevyn	Fernando	Rafael	Bebeshita	Ivonne	Mono				
Duel winner	Coreañera	Rafael	Carlos	Natalia; Pablo	Pascal	Mono	Azalia	Ivonne	Mono	Rafael	Niurka				
Nomination (Duel)	Kevyn	Azalia	Kenny	Fernando; Kenny	Ivonne	Azalia	Manelyk	Niurka	Julio	Kevyn	Kevyn				
Nomination (Farmers)	Rafael; Mónica	Niurka; Mónica	Carlos; Julio	Azalia; Natalia	Mónica; Julio	Mono; Julio	Rafael; Azalia	Pablo; Julio	Ivonne; Natalia	Niurka; Julio	Niurka; Ivonne				
Nomination (Betrayal)	Manelyk; Coreañera	Carlos	Bebeshita	Rafael	Mónica; Rafael	Niurka; Mónica	Natalia; Kunno	Mono	Kevyn; Fernando	Bebeshita					
Bebeshita	Mónica	Mónica	Rafael	Pablo	Julio	Ivonne	Rafael	Pablo	Ivonne	Niurka; Julio	Ivonne; Niurka				
Ivonne	Coreañera	Natalia	Julio	Kunno	Mónica	Mono	Mono	Pablo	Fernando	Niurka; Julio	Kunno; Niurka				
Julio	Mónica	María	Ivonne	Rafael	Mónica	Mono	Azalia	Pablo	Fernando	Niurka; Rafael	Niurka; Kunno				
Kevyn	Pascal	Bebeshita	Azalia	Mónica	Mónica	Mono	Mono	Mono	Fernando	Julio; Niurka	Niurka; Manelyk				
Kunno	Rafael	Niurka	Rafael	Natalia	Julio	Julio	Rafael	Pablo	Ivonne	Julio; Niurka	Ivonne; Niurka				
Manelyk	Rafael	Niurka	Carlos	Natalia	Julio	Ivonne	Rafael	Pablo	Ivonne	Niurka; Julio	Niurka; Ivonne				
Mono	Niurka	Niurka	Carlos	Pablo	Julio	Ivonne	Rafael	Pablo	Ivonne	Julio; Niurka	Niurka; Ivonne				
Niurka	Azalia	Bebeshita	Julio	Natalia	Mónica	Mono	Azalia	Julio	Fernando	Mono; Bebeshita	Bebeshita; Manelyk				
Rafael	Coreañera	Bebeshita	Julio	Azalia	Mónica	Mono	Azalia	Julio	Fernando	Niurka; Mono	Eliminated (Day 71)				
Fernando	Rafael	Mónica	Carlos	Natalia	Niurka	Kunno	Kunno	Julio	Ivonne	Eliminated (Day 64)					
Natalia	Rafael	Carlos	Carlos	Azalia	Fernando	Mono	Mono	Julio	Fernando	Walked (Day 64)					
Pablo	Not in the Farm		Carlos	Azalia	Mono	Mono	Mono	Julio	Eliminated (Day 57)						
Azalia	Mónica	Niurka	Carlos	Pablo	Julio	Ivonne	Rafael	Eliminated (Day 50)							
Pimpinela	Pascal	Carlos	Julio	Azalia	Mónica	Mono	Eliminated (Day 43)								
Mónica	Rafael	Bebeshita	Julio	Azalia	Mono; Rafael	Ivonne	Expelled (Day 43)								
Pascal	Coreañera	Mónica	Carlos	Rafael	Kevyn	Eliminated (Day 36)									
Kenny	Rafael	Niurka	Rafael	Natalia	Eliminated (Day 29)										
Carlos	Pimpinela	Mónica	Azalia	Eliminated (Day 22)											
María	Pimpinela	Kevyn	Eliminated (Day 15)												
Coreañera	Mono	Eliminated (Day 8)													
Notes	1, 2, 3	4, 5	6, 7	8, 9, 10	11, 12, 13, 14, 15	16, 17, 18	19, 20, 21	22, 23, 24	25, 26, 27	28, 29, 30	31				
Nominated	María; Kevyn; Rafael; Mónica	Manelyk; Azalia; Niurka; Mónica; Kevyn; María	Manelyk; Kenny; Carlos; Julio; Azalia; Kevyn	Bebeshita; Julio; Fernando; Kenny; Azalia; Natalia; Kunno; Manelyk	Pimpinela; Ivonne; Julio; Natalia; Pascal; Kevyn	Kevyn; Azalia; Mono; Julio	Fernando; Manelyk; Rafael; Azalia; Mono	Rafael; Natalia; Niurka; Kevyn; Pablo; Julio	Bebeshita; Julio; Mono; Ivonne; Natalia	Ivonne; Kevyn; Niurka; Julio; Rafael	Mono; Kevyn; Niurka; Ivonne; Kunno				
Salvation	María	Azalia	Kevyn	Bebeshita; Julio	Ivonne	Azalia	Fernando	Julio	Bebeshita	Julio	Ivonne				
Salvation by betrayal	Mónica	Manelyk	Azalia	Kunno	Natalia	Mono	Mono	Natalia	Julio	Kevyn					
Against public vote	Kevyn; Rafael; Manelyk; Coreañera	Niurka; Mónica; Kevyn; María; Carlos	Manelyk; Kenny; Carlos; Julio; Bebeshita	Fernando; Kenny; Azalia; Natalia; Manelyk; Rafael	Pimpinela; Julio; Pascal; Kevyn; Mónica; Rafael	Kevyn; Julio; Pimpinela; Niurka; Mónica	Manelyk; Rafael; Azalia; Natalia; Kunno	Rafael; Niurka; Kevyn; Pablo; Mono	Mono; Ivonne; Natalia; Kevyn; Fernando	Ivonne; Niurka; Rafael; Bebeshita					
Eliminated	Coreañera; Fewest votes to save	María; Fewest votes to save	Carlos; Fewest votes to save	Kenny; Fewest votes to save	Pascal; Fewest votes to save	Pimpinela; Fewest votes to save	Azalia; Fewest votes to save	Pablo; Fewest votes to save	Fernando; Fewest votes to save	Rafael; Fewest votes to save					

- ^Note 1: On Day 1, the public voted for their favorite farmer from four groups. Pimpinela, Mono, Ivonne and Manelyk were the winners of their respective groups. Of these four, Manelyk received the most votes and began a Chain of Salvation, where each farmer named one player to save from nomination. The chain ended with Ivonne nominating María for elimination.
- ^Note 2: On Day 4, due to a tie between Coreañera and Mónica with 3 votes each, foreman Julio had to choose which of the two to nominate. He nominated Mónica.
- ^Note 3: On Day 6, foreman Julio won a draw that allowed him to betray a farmer. He nominated Coreañera.
- ^Note 4: On Day 11, due to a tie between Bebeshita and Mónica with 4 votes each, foreman Pascal had to choose which of the two to nominate. He nominated Mónica. Additionally, Manelyk won the Golden Egg, which gave her the power to nominate a fifth farmer. She nominated Kevyn.
- ^Note 5: On Day 12, María was automatically nominated for elimination for repeatedly removing her microphone.
- ^Note 6: On Day 18, Azalia and Kevyn were automatically nominated for elimination due to a physical altercation. Additionally, Manelyk won the Golden Egg, which gave her the power to prevent a nominee from being saved. She chose Carlos.
- ^Note 7: On Day 20, a draw determined that the betrayal would be carried out through the Chain of Betrayal. As the winner of the Salvation, Kevyn started the chain in which each farmer betrayed a player. The chain ended with Pascal nominating Bebeshita for elimination.
- ^Note 8: In Week 4, the farmers, participated in the "Opposites Match!" dynamic, where they were tied together in pairs throughout the week. If one farmer is nominated for elimination, their partner is automatically nominated as well and together face the public vote. The pairs were: Azalia and Niurka, Bebeshita and Julio, Fernando and Kenny, Ivonne and Manelyk, Kevin and Pascal, Kunno and Pimpinela, Mónica and Rafael, Natalia and Pablo. Foreman Mono was exempt from the dynamic.
- ^Note 9: On Day 25, Natalia and Pablo won the Golden Egg, which gave them the power to nominate two farmers. Natalia nominated Kunno, while Pablo nominated Manelyk.
- ^Note 10: On Day 29, Kevyn, Kunno, Mónica, and Pimpinela accepted a temptation to reunite with a family member in exchange for receiving two penalty votes at the next Assembly.
- ^Note 11: On Day 30, the farmers searched for six horseshoes that provided advantages in the game. Bebeshita found the blue horseshoe which gave her safety from the Betrayal. Manelyk found the green horseshoe which gave her the power to automatically nominate a farmer; she nominated Natalia. Mónica found the silver horseshoe that gave her three extra nomination votes; she divided her votes, giving two to Mono and one to Rafael. Mono found the red horseshoe which gave him the power to duplicate his nomination vote. Pablo won the golden horseshoe that gave him immunity from elimination. Pimpinela won the yellow horseshoe and had the power to exchange Pablo for Kevyn as a stall farmer.
- ^Note 12: On Day 31, Natalia purchased a Golden Egg using $5,000 of the weekly budget, which gave her the power to nominate a farmer who could not be saved from elimination.
- ^Note 13: On Day 32, Mono won the Golden Egg, which gave him the power to save one of the five nominees (Pimpinela, Ivonne, Mónica, Julio, Natalia) at the end of the Assembly; he saved Mónica. Afterwards, Natalia used her Golden Egg to nominate Pascal.
- ^Note 14: On Day 33, Julio and Kevyn were punished for breaking the confidentiality agreement. Julio lost the ability to save himself from elimination, while Kevyn was nominated but was still able to compete in the Salvation competition. The same day, Azalia used $10,000 of the weekly budget to buy the power to nominate a second farmer by betrayal.
- ^Note 15: On Day 34, Ivonne nominated Mónica through a regular betrayal, while a draw determined that Azalia's purchased betrayal would be carried out through the Chain of Betrayal. The chain ended with Azalia nominating Rafael for elimination.
- ^Note 16: On Day 39, Kevyn won the Golden Egg, which gave him the power to swap one of the Assembly nominees (Mono or Ivonne) with a farmer of his choice. He replaced Ivonne with Julio.
- ^Note 17: On Day 41, Pimpinela was automatically nominated for elimination due to his comments about Manelyk. Additionally, a draw determined that there would be a double betrayal, with Azalia nominating Niurka, and the latter nominating Mónica.
- ^Note 18: On Day 43, Mónica was expelled from the farm for violating the rules of coexistence by hitting Niurka on the back on day 41.
- ^Note 19: In Week 7, the farmers were divided into four teams, with the exception of foreman Julio. The teams were named after classical elements and each had an extra nomination vote at the Assembly. Team Fire (Bebeshita, Manelyk, Niurka) and Team Air (Azalia, Fernando, Pablo) nominated Ivonne, Team Earth (Ivonne, Kunno, Mono) nominated Rafael, and Team Water (Kevyn, Natalia, Rafael) nominated Azalia.
- ^Note 20: On Day 46, due to a tie between Azalia and Mono with 4 votes each, foreman Julio had to choose which of the two to nominate. He nominated Azalia. However, Fernando won the Golden Egg, which gave him the power to nominate a fifth farmer, and he decided to nominate Mono.
- ^Note 21: On Day 48, a draw determined that there would be a double betrayal, with Fernando nominating Natalia, and the latter nominating Kunno.
- ^Note 22: On Day 50, Mono won a horseshoe that gave him the power to nominate a farmer. The following day, he nominated Natalia.
- ^Note 23: On Day 53, Kevyn was automatically nominated for elimination for sabotaging his team in the Golden Egg challenge.
- ^Note 24: On Day 55, a draw determined that the betrayal would be carried out through the Chain of Betrayal. As the winner of the Salvation, Julio started the chain that ended with Manelyk nominating Mono for elimination.
- ^Note 25: On Day 60, Mono was automatically nominated for elimination for his treatment of Tlacoyo, the farm's dog. Additionally, Kevyn won the Golden Egg, which gave him the power to swap one of the Assembly nominees (Fernando or Ivonne) with a farmer of his choice. He replaced Fernando with Ivonne.
- ^Note 26: On Day 62, a draw determined that there would be a double betrayal, with Bebeshita nominating Kevyn, and the latter nominating Fernando.
- ^Note 27: On Day 64, Natalia walked from the competition to focus on her mental health.
- ^Note 28: Starting in Week 10, each farmer had to nominate two farmers for elimination. Their first nomination is for 2 points, while their second nomination is for 1 point.
- ^Note 29: On Day 67, Mono won the Golden Egg, which gave him the power to nominate a fifth farmer. He nominated Rafael.
- ^Note 30: On Day 69, a draw determined that there would be a double betrayal, with Julio nominating Mono, and the latter nominating Bebeshita. Afterwards, Kunno used a horseshoe he had won on Day 64 to save Mono from elimination.
- ^Note 31: On Day 74, Bebeshita won the Golden Egg, which gave her the power to nominate a fifth farmer. She nominated Kunno.

== Episodes ==
No. overall	No. in season	Title	Original release date	Mexico viewers (millions)
Week 1
62	1	"La gala #1"	6 September 2026	2.25
63	2	"El capataz #1"	7 September 2026	1.68
64	3	"El duelo #1"	8 September 2026	1.59
65	4	"La asamblea #1"	9 September 2026	1.60
66	5	"La salvación #1"	10 September 2026	1.63
67	6	"La traición #1"	11 September 2026	1.55
68	7	"La gala #2"	13 September 2026	1.89
Week 2
69	8	"El capataz #2"	14 September 2026	1.64
70	9	"El duelo #2"	15 September 2026	1.32
71	10	"La asamblea #2"	16 September 2026	1.86
72	11	"La salvación #2"	17 September 2026	1.67
73	12	"La traición #2"	18 September 2026	1.44
74	13	"La gala #3"	20 September 2026	1.81
Week 3
75	14	"El capataz #3"	21 September 2026	1.79
76	15	"El duelo #3"	22 September 2026	1.62
77	16	"La asamblea #3"	23 September 2026	1.84
78	17	"La salvación #3"	24 September 2026	2.07
79	18	"La traición #3"	25 September 2026	1.75
80	19	"La gala #4"	27 September 2026	1.89
Week 4
81	20	"El capataz #4"	28 September 2026	1.86
82	21	"El duelo #4"	29 September 2026	1.70
83	22	"La asamblea #4"	30 September 2026	1.84
84	23	"La salvación #4"	1 October 2026	2.13
85	24	"La traición #4"	2 October 2026	1.67
86	25	"La gala #5"	4 October 2026	1.88
Week 5
87	26	"El capataz #5"	5 October 2026	1.65
88	27	"El duelo #5"	6 October 2026	1.72
89	28	"La asamblea #5"	7 October 2026	2.09
90	29	"La salvación #5"	8 October 2026	1.94
91	30	"La traición #5"	9 October 2026	1.65
92	31	"La gala #6"	11 October 2026	2.51
Week 6
93	32	"El capataz #6"	12 October 2026	1.97
94	33	"El duelo #6"	13 October 2026	2.10
95	34	"La asamblea #6"	14 October 2026	N/A
96	35	"La salvación #6"	15 October 2026	2.47
97	36	"La traición #6"	16 October 2026	2.28
98	37	"La gala #7"	18 October 2026	2.18
Week 7
99	38	"El capataz #7"	19 October 2026	1.77
100	39	"El duelo #7"	20 October 2026	1.86
101	40	"La asamblea #7"	21 October 2026	2.19
102	41	"La salvación #7"	22 October 2026	2.21
103	42	"La traición #7"	23 October 2026	2.11
104	43	"La gala #8"	25 October 2026	2.23
Week 8
105	44	"El capataz #8"	26 October 2026	2.38
106	45	"El duelo #8"	27 October 2026	2.20
107	46	"La asamblea #8"	28 October 2026	2.23
108	47	"La salvación #8"	29 October 2026	2.28
109	48	"La traición #8"	30 October 2026	2.07
110	49	"La gala #9"	1 November 2026	2.12
Week 9
111	50	"El capataz #9"	2 November 2026	2.36
112	51	"El duelo #9"	3 November 2026	2.12
113	52	"La asamblea #9"	4 November 2026	2.17
114	53	"La salvación #9"	5 November 2026	2.35
115	54	"La traición #9"	6 November 2026	2.25
116	55	"La gala #10"	8 November 2026	2.40
Week 10
117	56	"El capataz #10"	9 November 2026	2.22
118	57	"El duelo #10"	10 November 2026	2.25
119	58	"La asamblea #10"	11 November 2026	2.13
120	59	"La salvación #10"	12 November 2026	2.08
121	60	"La traición #10"	13 November 2026	2.09
122	61	"La gala #11"	15 November 2026	2.23
Week 11
123	62	"El capataz #11"	16 November 2026	2.11
124	63	"El duelo #11"	17 November 2026	1.88
125	64	"La asamblea #11"	18 November 2026	TBD
126	65	"La salvación #11"	19 November 2026	TBD
