= La Venganza de los Ex VIP season 2 =

Second series of La Venganza de los Ex VIP

La Venganza de los Ex VIP
- Season 2
- No. of episodes: 12

Release
- Original network: MTV
- Original release: 24 January – 4 April 2023

Season chronology
- ← Previous; VIP 1 Next → VIP 3

The second season of La Venganza de los Ex VIP began airing on 24 January 2023. The series was confirmed in December 2022 when it was announced that filming had begun and would feature another full cast of celebrities rather than civilians.

== Cast ==
The list of cast members was released in January 2023. They include five men; Brandon Meza, Christian Renaud, Isaac Torres, Pedro Luis Figueira known as "La Divaza", Rafael Delgado known as "Rufas" and five women: Ana Cisneros, Diana Estrada, Leslie Gallardo, Lizbeth Rodríguez and Yurgenis Aular.

All the singles joined in the first episode, Andrea Gasca, Isaac's ex, was the first to arrive. In the second episode, Diana's ex Jay Castro came to the beach. During the fourth episode, Andrés Carruyo, Pedro's ex, came to the beach. Later, Michelle Lando arrived at the house as Rafael's ex, who was part of the previous season. In the sixth episode, Leslie's ex, Lalo, arrived at the beach, and later Ali, Lizbeth's ex, also arrived. Carolina Godoy arrived at the beach as Brandon's ex. In the eighth episode, "Tablet of Terror" asked Pedro to expel one of his exes, this after Eliot Liendo arrived at the beach, as a result Andrés was eliminated from the villa. Acapulco Shore star Jibranne Bazán hit the beach as Ana and Michelle's ex. In the tenth episode, Rafael's ex, Yesica Olivieri, arrived at the beach; During a party, Kaly Aispuro, Jay Castro's ex, arrived at the villa.

- **Bold** indicates original cast member; all other cast were brought into the series as an ex.

#Ep.	Name	Age (Note: Age when first appearing on the show.)	From	Notability	Exes
12	**Ana Cisneros**	22	Mexico	Actress and Internet personality	Jibranne
12	**Brandon Meza**	24	Mexico	Internet personality	Carolina
12	**Christian Renaud**	22	Mexico	Tiktok star	—N/a
12	**Diana Estrada**	25	Mexico	YouTuber	Jay
12	**Isaac Torres**	26	Spain	Former Super Shore cast member	Andrea
12	**Leslie Gallardo**	22	Mexico	Former Acapulco Shore cast member	Eduardo
12	**Lizbeth Rodríguez**	28	Mexico	Influencer and announcer	Ali
12	**Pedro "La Divaza" Figueira**	23	Venezuela	YouTuber	Andrés, Eliot
12	**Rafael "Rufas" Delgado**	26	Venezuela	Tiktok star	Michelle, Yesica
12	**Yurgenis Aular**	27	Venezuela	Internet personality	—N/a
12	Andrea Gasca	28	Spain	Temptation Island Spain star	Isaac
11	Jay Castro	24	Mexico	—N/a	Diana, Kaly
5	Andrés Aron Carruyo		Venezuela	—N/a	Pedro
9	Michelle Lando	22	Paraguay	La Venganza de los Ex VIP star	Rafael, Jibranne
7	Eduardo "Lalo" Martínez	26	Mexico	—N/a	Leslie
7	Ali	25	Mexico	—N/a	Lizbeth
6	Carolina Godoy	24	Argentina	—N/a	Brandon
5	Eliot Liendo		Venezuela	—N/a	Pedro
4	Jibranne "Jey" Bazán	30	Mexico	Former Acapulco Shore cast member	Ana, Michelle
3	Yesica "Yess" Olivieri		Colombia	—N/a	Rafael
3	Kaly Aispuro	20	Mexico	—N/a	Jay

== Future Appearances ==
After filming, Michelle Lando participated in the first season of Los 50. La Divaza and Leslie Gallardo entered La casa de los famosos in 2024. In 2025, Leslie Gallardo joined MasterChef Celebrity Mexico. Jibranne Bazán competed in the second season of Tentados por la fortuna. Ana Cisneros and Yurgenis Aular returned for the fourth season VIP in the role of exes.

== Duration of cast ==
Cast members	Episodes											
Cast members	1	2	3	4	5	6	7	8	9	10	11	12
Ana												
Brandon												
Christian												
Diana												
La Divaza												
Isaac												
Leslie												
Lizbeth												
Rufas												
Yurgenis												
Andrea												
Jay C												
Andrés												
Michelle												
Lalo												
Ali												
Carolina												
Eliot												
Jey B												
Yess												
Kaly												

Key: = "Cast member" is featured in this episode
Key: = "Cast member" arrives on the beach
Key: = "Cast member" has an ex arrive on the beach
Key: = "Cast member" arrives on the beach and has an ex arrive during the same episode
Key: = "Cast member" leaves the beach
Key: = "Cast member" does not feature in this episode

== Episodes ==
No. overall	No. in season	Title	Original release date
13	1	"Episode 1"	24 January 2023
14	2	"Episode 2"	24 January 2023
15	3	"Episode 3"	31 January 2023
16	4	"Episode 4"	7 February 2023
17	5	"Episode 5"	14 February 2023
18	6	"Episode 6"	21 February 2023
19	7	"Episode 7"	28 February 2023
20	8	"Episode 8"	7 March 2023
21	9	"Episode 9"	14 March 2023
22	10	"Episode 10"	21 March 2023
23	11	"Episode 11"	28 March 2023
24	12	"Episode 12"	4 April 2023
