= Chingu Amiga =

South Korean social media influencer

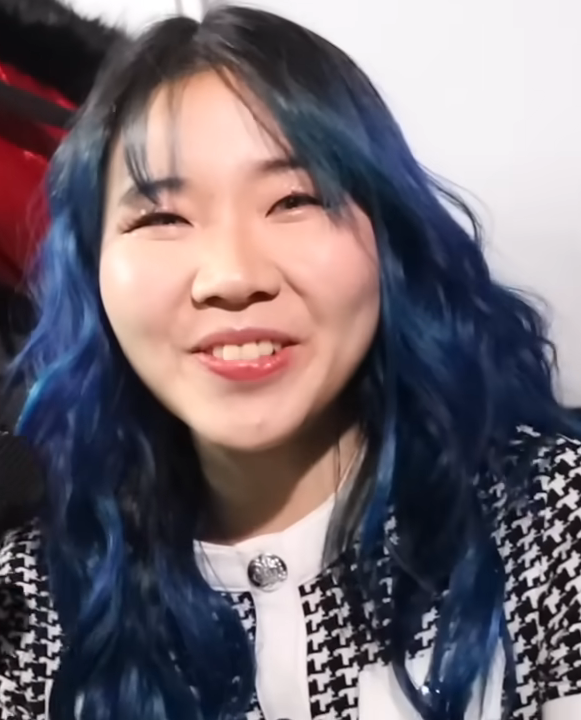
- Chingu Amiga in 2022
- Born: Sujin Kim; April 3, 1991 (age 35); Busan, South Korea
- Education: Myongji University; Autonomous University of Nuevo León

YouTube information
- Channel: Chingu amiga
- Years active: 2021–present
- Genre: Vlog
- Subscribers: 15.2 million
- Views: 12.3 billion
- Last updated: October 21, 2025

Sujin Kim (Korean: 김수진, born April 3, 1991), known online as Chingu Amiga, is a South Korean social media influencer based in Mexico.

== Life and career ==
In 2021, Kim rose to prominence on social media by sharing short videos about her life and experiences as a Korean living in Mexico. She has since amassed over 28 million followers on TikTok and 15 million subscribers on YouTube.

Sujin Kim was raised in Seoul, South Korea, and graduated with a degree in Business Administration from Myongji University. After experiencing workplace mistreatment, she briefly lived in Canada and Brazil participating in work-study programs before settling in Mexico in 2018.

Kim initially moved to Monterrey in 2016 to work as an administrator at Mexican branches of Korean companies. She later studied International Relations at the Faculty of Political Science and International Relations at the Autonomous University of Nuevo León. Alongside her studies, she taught Korean both at the university and through her own website.

In 2021, Kim gained prominence on social media by sharing short videos about her life and experiences as a Korean living in Mexico. Since 2021, Kim has public relationship with Rodrigo Vázquez, a biotechnology engineer from Oaxaca, Mexico. She obtained the Mexican citizenship and is a permanent resident of Mexico.

== Awards and nominations ==
Name of the award ceremony, year presented, nominee(s) of the award, award category, and the result of the nomination
Award ceremony	Year	Category	Nominee(s)/work(s)	Result	Ref.
MTV MIAW Awards	2023	MIAW Icon	Herself	Nominated	
MTV MIAW Awards	2023	Comedy Boss	Herself	Won	
MTV MIAW Awards	2024	MIAW Icon	Herself	Nominated	
Nickelodeon Mexico Kids' Choice Awards	2023	Funniest Creator	Herself	Nominated	

== See also ==
- Koreans in Mexico
