= Spreen =

Argentine YouTuber, Kick streamer

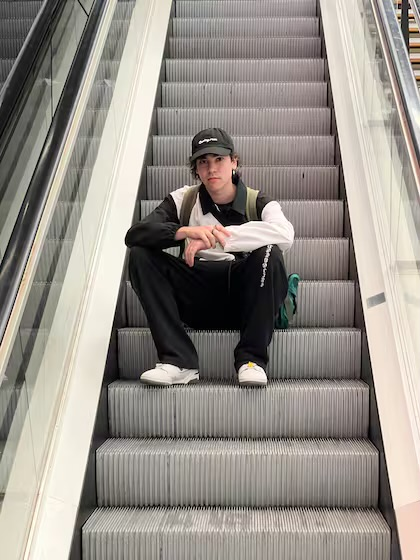
- Spreen in 2024
- Born: Iván Raúl Buhajeruk Fernández; 11 October 2000 (age 26); Santo Tomé, Santa Fe, Argentina
- Occupations: YouTuber; Online streamer

Kick information
- Channel: Spreen
- Years active: 2024–present
- Followers: 1.4 million

Twitch information
- Channel: ElSpreen
- Years active: 2017–2024
- Followers: 9.61 million

YouTube information
- Channel: Spreen
- Years active: 2016–present
- Subscribers: 8.02 million (2 July 2025)
- Views: 1.92 billion (2 July 2025)
- Website: spreen.com.ar

Iván Raúl Buhajeruk Fernández (born 11 October 2000), better known as Spreen, is an Argentine streamer, YouTuber and former professional footballer.

== Career ==
Spreen began his online career in 2012, initially on YouTube and later expanding to Twitch. His content includes gaming, tutorials, and vlogs, with a focus on creating a community feel with his audience.

In 2023, Spreen was nominated Content Creator of the Year, and surpassed streamers such as ElRubius and IlloJuan. As of July 2022, Spreen's Twitch channel had over 6,700 paid subscribers, and his YouTube channel had 4.4 million subscribers.

On 22 September 2024, Spreen made the switch to the new streaming platform Kick. Spreen stated that the move was motivated by better financial terms, claiming he could earn in a single livestream on Kick what he previously made in a month on Twitch.

== Football controversy ==
In November 2024, Spreen made his professional football debut as a striker for Deportivo Riestra, before being substituted after less than a minute, in their Argentine Primera División match against Velez Sarsfield in a 1–1 draw. The debut drew criticism in Argentine media, with Estudiantes de la Plata president Juan Sebastián Verón describing it as a "stunt" and a "lack of respect for football and footballers." Neither Spreen nor Deportivo Riestra issued a public comment at the time. Following the incident, the Argentine Football Association announced an ethics investigation, reportedly in connection with the circumstances of the match.
