= El Malilla =

Mexican rapper (born 1999)

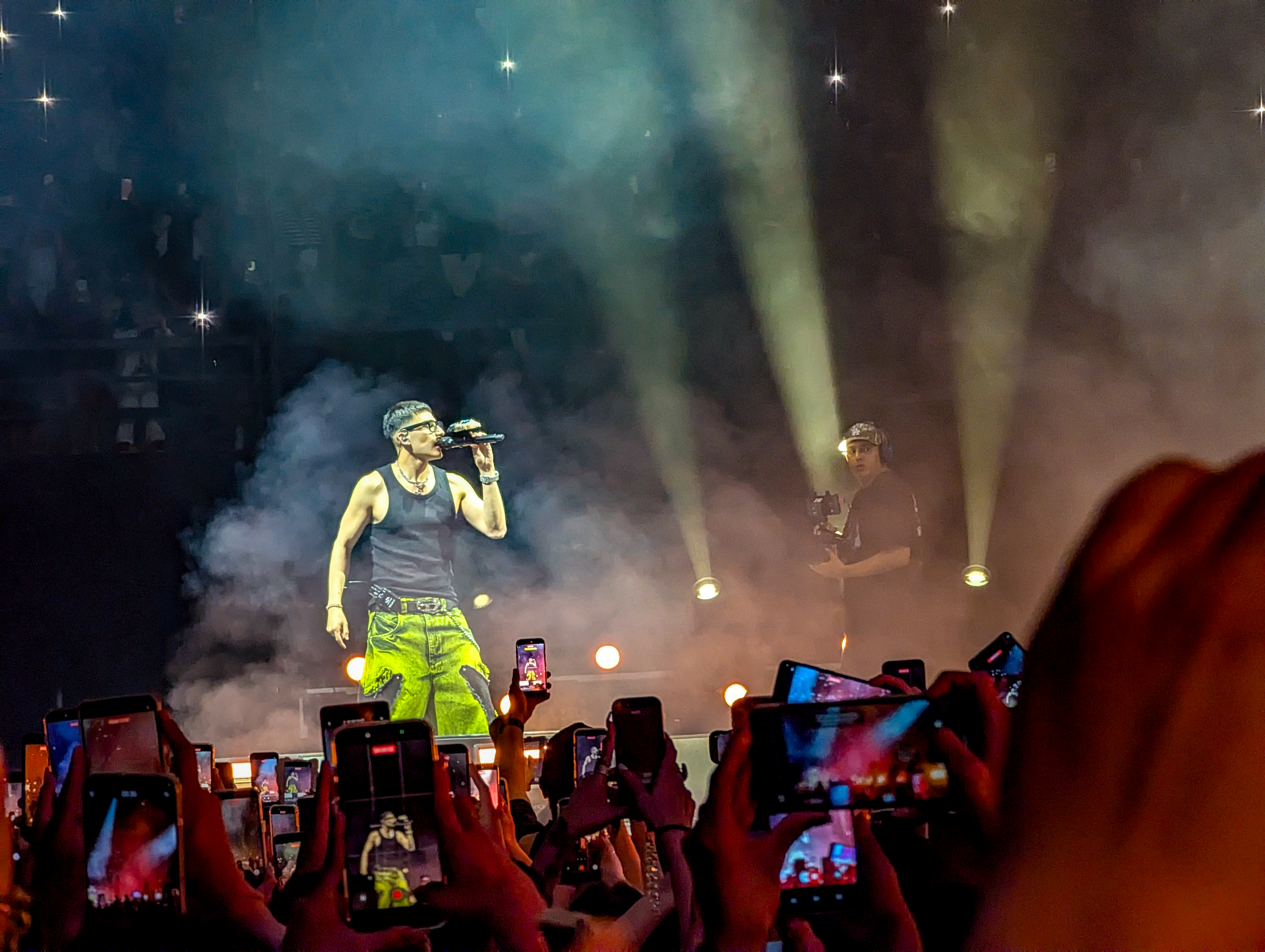

Background information
- Born: Fernando Hernández Flores; 26 August 1999 (age 26); Valle de Chalco, State of Mexico, Mexico
- Genres: Reggaeton
- Occupations: Rapper; singer; songwriter; musician
- Instrument: Vocals
- Label: Universal Music Group

Fernando Hernández Flores (born 26 August 1999), known professionally as El Malilla, is a Mexican reggaeton rapper, singer and songwriter.

== Career ==
El Malilla initially began his career as a hobby in the hip-hop scene, but during the pandemic, he decided to dedicate himself to the urban genre. His stage name comes from a producer calling him "vato malilla" in the recording studio. By October 2024, he had amassed 8 million monthly listeners on Spotify, being recognized as a representative of Mexican reggaeton. El Malilla performed daily at festivals and fairs such as the 2024 Chimalhuacán Metropolitan Fair, the Coca-Cola Flow Fest, and La Santa Fiesta at the Foro Sol. However, he has also had solo concerts, such as the three sold-out dates in August 2024 at the BB Auditorium in Mexico City or his performance at Axe Ceremonia in 2023.

El Malilla has collaborated with several artists of the same genre such as J Balvin, Dani Flow, El Bogueto, Uzielito Mix, Ms Nina, Bellakath, and Yeri Mua.
