= Diego Castellanos =

Mexican footballer (born 1993)

Diego Castellanos Sánchez (born March 14, 1993, in Guadalajara, Jalisco), known as Diego Castellanos, is a former Mexican professional football player who last played as a forward.
