= Adal Ramones =

Mexican television presenter (born 1961)

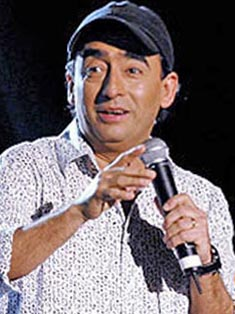
- Born: Adalberto Javier Ramones Martínez; 3 December 1961 (age 64); Monterrey, Nuevo León, Mexico
- Occupation: Actor
- Spouse: Gaby Valencia (1998–2013)
- Website: http://adalramones.net/

Adalberto Javier Ramones Martínez (born 3 December 1961) is a Mexican television presenter and comedian, known for his commentary on Mexican and international social life. Ramones was the host of the popular Mexican television show Otro Rollo, which was produced by Televisa and broadcast in 53 other countries, including the United States, where it aired on Univision.

== Biography ==
Ramones was born in Monterrey, Nuevo León. He suffered from heart disease for a long portion of his life, but after several operations, he managed to recover. He earned his communication degree from Universidad Regiomontana. Since 1998, Ramones is romantically involved with Gaby Valencia. Their first child, Paola Ramones, was born in 2001.

In 1998, Ramones was a victim of kidnapping one month before his wedding. His kidnappers locked him in a closet, blindfolded with his hands and feet bound. He lost 7 kilos during those seven days, only allowed to drink minimum water and constantly threatened by the criminal gang. Three chapters of his autobiography, to be published by the Planeta publishing house, cover this kidnap episode.

On 10 October 2002, he suffered an accident where he caught fire during the "Reto Burundis" in Otro Rollo.

In February 2003, Ramones suffered burns to several parts of his body as he was shooting his show, requiring hospitalization. He had to wear glasses for some time after this.

On 30 July of that year, American pop star Britney Spears sang at his show, and on September of that year, he led the La pesera del amor contest, where a man chose among a number of women to pick a future wife. Ramones promised the man and the contest winner that the show would pay for their wedding and he would broadcast it live. La pesera del amor was later kept as a regular feature and more contestants participated for the chance to meet someone.

In November 2003, Sylvester Stallone became the second American superstar to participate in the show that year.

Other international stars that have appeared in the show through the years are: Ricky Martin, t.A.T.u., Will Smith (three times), Sylvester Stallone, Arnold Schwarzenegger, Kevin James, Sylvia Saint, Diego Maradona, Christina Aguilera, David Copperfield, Drew Barrymore, Cameron Díaz, Lucy Liu, Chris Rock, Chayanne, John Leguizamo, N*SYNC, The Backstreet Boys, Gloria Gaynor, Shakira and The Rock. Worthy of note, although Paris Hilton was scheduled to appear on the show, she did not show up, leaving him to wait live in front of millions of viewers.

In March 2004 he suffered an accident, breaking an ankle and requiring crutches.

In 2005, he was also nominated for a Mexican MTV Movie Award, being Favorite Actor (for his role in Puños rosas). He was also the host of the TV reality show Cantando por un sueño and Bailando por un Sueño.

In December 2006 he participated in the Mexican production of the Mel Brooks musical The Producers in the role of Leo Bloom.

On 8 May 2007 the series Otro Rollo con: Adal Ramones was broadcast for the last time.

He most recently began co-hosting the television series La vida es mejor cantando.

== Television appearances ==
=== As host ===
- 1995–2007 Otro rollo con: Adal Ramones
- 2000 - No contaban con mi astucia
- 2003 - La pesera del amor
- 2003 - Nuestra Navidad 2003
- 2004 - Premio lo Nuestro a la música Latina 2004
- 2005 - Otro rollo... Historia en diez
- 2005 - Bailando por un sueño
- 2006 - Cantando por un sueño
- 2006 - Los reyes de la pista
- 2007 - Primer Campeonato Internacional de Baile
- 2008 - Premios Casandra Dominican Republic
- 2008 - El Show de los Sueños: Sangre de mi Sangre
- 2011 - La Vida es Mejor Cantando
- 2018–present La Academia
- 2025 - La Granja VIP

=== As actor ===
- 1998 - Bug's Life (Spanish voice of Francis the ladybug)
- 1999 - Stuart Little (Spanish voice of Stuart Little)
- 2001 - Cats & Dogs (Lou's Spanish Voice)
- 2002 - El Gran Carnal (as Plutarco Urquidi)
- 2002 - El Gran Carnal 2 (as Tizok)
- 2002 - Stuart Little 2 (Spanish voice of Stuart Little)
- 2003 - Amor real (as a circus owner)
- 2004 - Puños rosas (as Álvaro)
- 2004 - Santos peregrinos (as Nicandro)
- 2005 - 3 episodes of Bajo el mismo techo (as Gerry)
- 2006 - Los Productores (as Leo Bloom)
- 2007 - Y Ahora Qué Hago? (as himself)
- 2009 - Martin al Amanecer (Martin)
- 2010 - Pocoyo (narrator)
- 2011 - Saving Private Perez (as Benito Garcia)
- 2014 - Maikol Yordan de viaje perdido (as Malavassi)
- 2016 - El Americano: The Movie (as Trueno)
- 2018 - Marcianos vs. Mexicanos (as El Chacas)
- 2021 - The Mighty Victoria (as Raúl Martínez)
