= La Granja VIP (Mexican TV series) =

- Genre: Reality competition
- Created by: Strix Television
- Based on: The Farm
- Showrunner: Fito Maña
- Presented by: Adal Ramones; Kristal Silva; Alex Garza
- Country of origin: Mexico
- Original language: Spanish
- No. of seasons: 2
- No. of episodes: 126

Production
- Executive producers: David Ortíz Marquet; Leonel Arteaga
- Production location: Mexico City, Mexico
- Camera setup: Multi-camera
- Production companies: TV Azteca; Fremantle

Original release
- Network: Azteca Uno
- Release: 12 October 2025 – present

La Granja VIP is a Mexican reality competition television show based on the Swedish show The Farm created by producer Strix in 2001. It premiered on Azteca Uno on 12 October 2025.

The show broadly follows the premise of other versions, in which a group of contestants live together on a farm that is isolated from the outside world and compete for a cash prize. They must complete the daily tasks of a typical farmer while being continuously monitored during their stay by live television cameras. Throughout the competition, contestants are eliminated by public vote.

In December 2025, the series was renewed for a second season that premiered on 6 September 2026.

== Format ==
La Granja VIP puts a group of 16 celebrities, known as Farmers, living together on a farm and isolated from the outside world. The celebrities must work as a normal farmer, caring for animals, milking cows, planting and harvesting food, cleaning stables, and carrying firewood. The audience can view the celebrities inside the farm with the live feeds. Every day, the celebrities face competitions and activities such as the Foreman competition, The Duel, Assembly Wednesday, the Salvation competition, and Betrayal Friday. Each week, the audience will have the opportunity to vote to decide who leaves the farm, until the winner is chosen.

Foreman Competition

The farmers compete for leadership of the week, which gives them immunity, privileges within the game, and they are able to make decisions about the tasks of others.

The Duel

The Foreman selects two farmers to face off in a duel, and the loser is automatically nominated for elimination.

Assembly

In the assembly, the farmers have a face-to-face nomination.

Salvation Competition

The nominees compete in a skill or endurance challenge to save themselves from elimination.

Betrayal Friday

The farmers face unexpected twists that can cause betrayals and alliances to break.

The Golden Egg

The farmers compete for the Golden Egg, which gives the winner an advantage to use at the end of the Assembly. The advantages include: automatically nominate a farmer, add or subtract votes from the nominees, or grant immunity to a farmer.

== Series overview ==
Series	Episodes	Originally released		Days	Farmers	Winner	Runner–up
Series	Episodes	First released	Last released	Days	Farmers	Winner	Runner–up
1	61	12 October 2025	21 December 2025	71	16	Alfredo Adame	Eleazar Gomez
2	TBA	6 September 2026	TBA	TBA	20	TBA	TBA

== Production ==
On 18 July 2025, it was announced that TV Azteca acquired the rights to The Farm and would produce a celebrity version of the series titled La Granja VIP. On 26 August 2025, Adal Ramones was announced as host of the series. On 2 September 2025, Kristal Silva and Alex Garza were announced as co-hosts. Linet Puente, Flor Rubio, Ferka and Rey Grupero form the panel of critics, who observe and give their opinions on the contestants. Lola Cortés was initially announced as a critic, however, on the premiere episode she was revealed as the surprise sixteenth farmer. The series is filmed on a rural property in Ajusco, south of Mexico City.

On 21 December 2025, TV Azteca renewed the series for a second season.

== Broadcast ==
La Granja VIP premiered on Azteca Uno on 12 October 2025. Disney+ provides access to 24/7 live feeds. The second season premiered on 6 September 2026.

== Ratings ==
Viewership and ratings per season of La Granja VIP
Season	Timeslot (CT)	Episodes	First aired		Last aired		Avg. viewers (millions)
Season	Timeslot (CT)	Episodes	Date	Viewers (millions)	Date	Viewers (millions)	Avg. viewers (millions)
1	Sunday 8:00 p.m. Mon–Fri 9:00 p.m.	57	12 October 2025	2.16	21 December 2025	N/A	1.86
2	Sunday 8:00 p.m. Mon–Fri 8:30 p.m.	62	6 September 2026	2.25	TBA	TBD	1.98
