= La Divaza =

Venezuelan YouTuber and singer

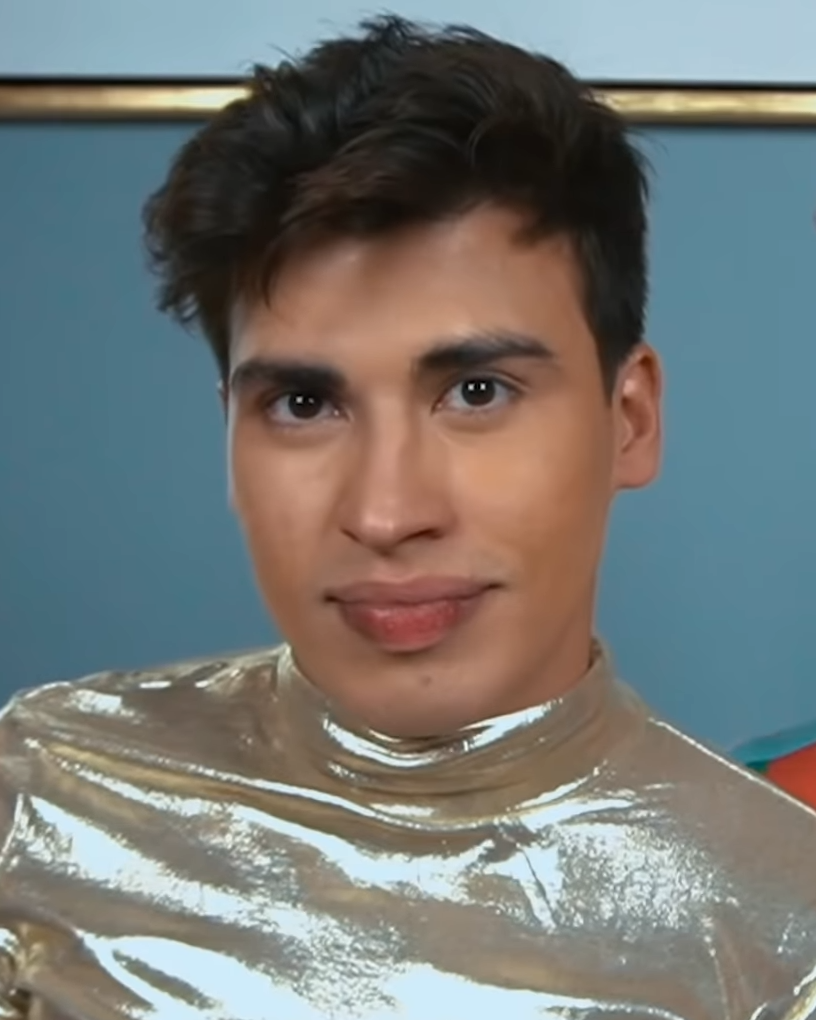
- Born: Pedro Luis Joao Figueira Álvarez; 18 June 1998 (age 28); Maracay, Aragua, Venezuela

YouTube information
- Channel: LA DIVAZA
- Years active: 2012–present
- Genres: Gaming; comedy; vlog; Let's play
- Subscribers: 10.5 million
- Views: 936.67 million
- Last updated: 2 February 2026

Pedro Luis Joao Figueira Álvarez (born 18 June 1998), known as La Divaza, is a Venezuelan YouTuber and singer. He is the second YouTuber from Venezuela to reach one million subscribers, after Dross.

== Biography and career ==
Pedro Luis Joao Figueira Álvarez was born in Maracay, Aragua, Venezuela. He studied at Instituto Escuela Maracay, where he graduated in 2015. Figueira began creating content on YouTube in late 2012, initially focusing on commentary videos about the situation in Venezuela. His online persona, La Divaza, quickly gained attention for its distinctive and flamboyant style, generating both national and international controversy. Before adopting this persona, he had posted videos related to the social network Habbo in 2011, but discontinued that content in 2012 when his new channel began to grow in popularity.

La Divaza serves as his online alter ego, a self-described "diva", and the channel features a wide range of content, including vlogs, gameplays, reviews, parodies, and discussions of social issues. He also produces annual videos reviewing major pop culture events such as the MTV Video Music Awards, American Music Awards, MTV Europe Music Awards, Billboard Music Awards, Miss Universe, the Met Gala, and the Grammy Awards. He frequently collaborates with fellow friend José Gregorio Santos Terrasi, known as La José, with whom he currently resides in Mexico City.

In December 2017, Figueira released the single "Roast Yourself" as part of a viral YouTube challenge of the same name. The accompanying music video quickly became a hit, reaching one million likes and six million views within 24 hours. It later peaked at number one on iTunes in Mexico and several Latin American countries. By June 2020, the video had accumulated over 115 million views and 3.5 million likes, becoming one of the most successful releases by a YouTuber in the region. Figueira performed the song live at the 2018 MTV MIAW Awards, which he co-hosted with singer Mon Laferte, winning the awards for Icon of the Year and Roasted of the Year. On 15 November 2019, he released his first single under Warner Music Group, titled "Cachete al Suelo". Subsequent releases include "D.I.V.A." (2020) and "La Noche" (2022). In 2020, he also participated in a challenge video with Colombian singer Karol G.

In 2023, Figueira joined the cast of the reality show La Venganza de los Ex, broadcast by MTV Latin America and available on the streaming platform Paramount+. He also maintains a secondary YouTube channel, Keeping Up With La Divaza, where he co-hosts the podcast Radio Divaza with La José. The program is also distributed through audio platforms.

== Filmography ==
=== TV ===
Year	Program	Role	Notes
2018	MTV Millennial Awards	Host	
2023, 2026	La Venganza de los Ex VIP	Herself	Main cast (season 2 and 5); 22 episodes
2024	La casa de los famosos	Contestant	13th place
2026	Top Chef VIP	Contestant	19th place; 11 episodes

== Awards and nominations ==
Year	Event	Category	Result	Ref.
2016	MTV MIAW Awards	Styler of the year	Nominated	
2017	MTV MIAW Awards	The freshest face	Nominated	
2017	MTV MIAW Awards	Supercolab of the year	Nominated	
2018	MTV MIAW Awards	Miaw icon of the year	Won	
2018	MTV MIAW Awards	Roast of the year	Won	
2019	MTV MIAW Awards	Miaw icon	Nominated	
2019	MTV MIAW Awards	Instastories	Nominated	
2021	MTV MIAW Awards	God of the Podcast	Won	
