= Yeri Mua =

Mexican singer and songwriter (born 2001)

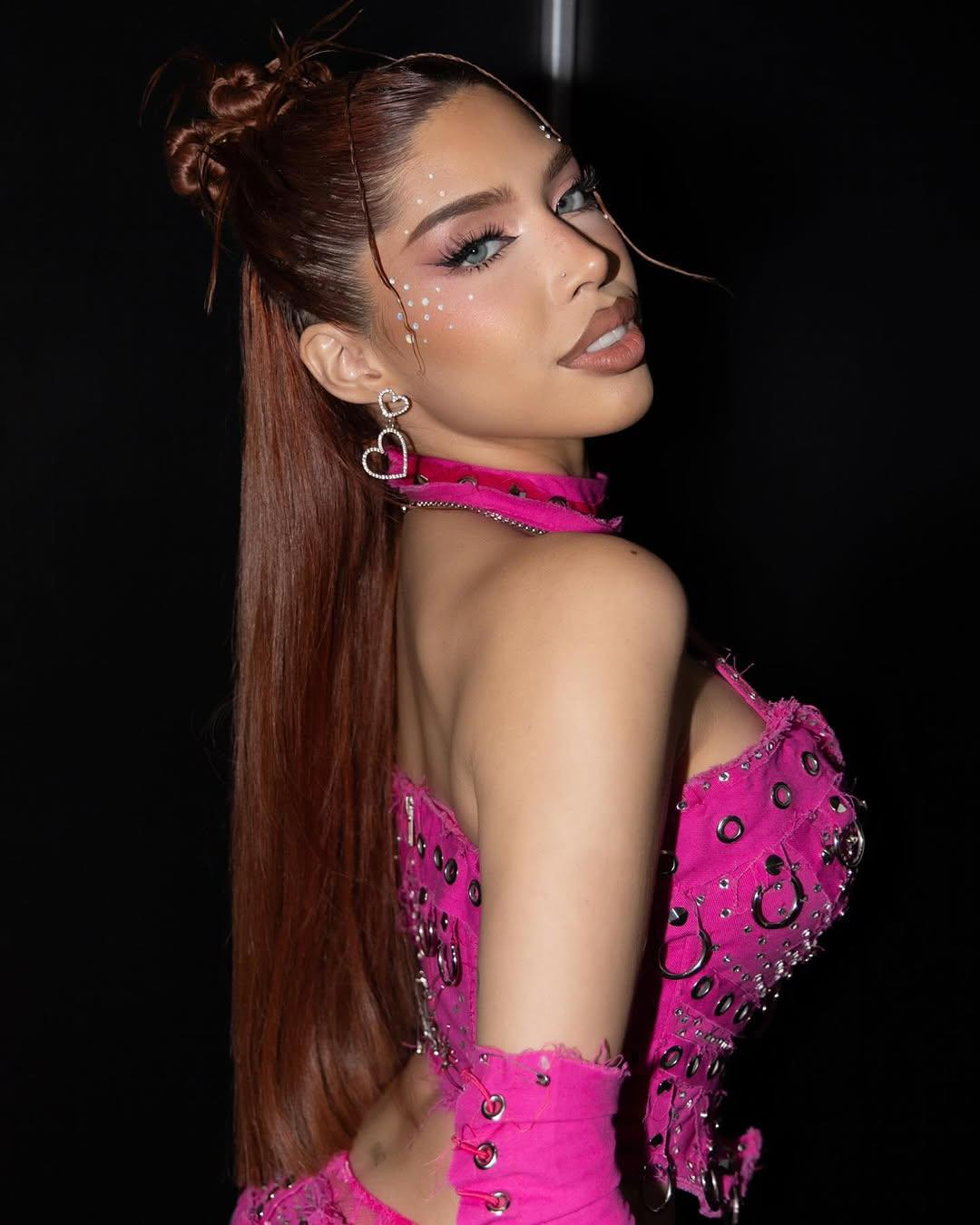

Background information
- Born: Yeri Cruz Varela; 17 December 2001 (age 24); Veracruz, Veracruz, Mexico
- Genres: Reggaeton; neoperreo; Latin pop
- Occupations: Singer; songwriter; internet personality; entrepreneur
- Instrument: Vocals
- Years active: 2017–present
- Label: Sony Mexico (2024—present)

Yeri Cruz Varela (born 17 December 2001), known professionally as Yeri Mua, is a Mexican internet celebrity, singer, songwriter, and entrepreneur. She rose to popularity in 2018 for her live streams of makeup and cosmetics on Instagram and Facebook. In 2023, she embarked on a career as a reggaeton artists, notable for singles such as "Chupón" and "Línea Del Perreo."

In 2024, Yeri Mua signed a recording contract with Sony Music Mexico, and in May 15, 2025, she released her studio album, "De Chava", accompanied by a deluxe version on July 3.

== Early life ==
Born on 17 December 2001, in Veracruz, Mexico, Cruz Varela has a brother named Joshua. Her parents are Silvio, better known as Papá Bratz, and Yahel, better known as Mamá Bratz, who also stream on Facebook. Mua took her first steps into the world of social media at the age of sixteen, when she opened her Instagram account.

== Career ==
Mua began her foray into the world of streaming on Facebook, where she initially shared her makeup routine and beauty tutorials. Over time, her broadcasts went viral, making her the most recognized Spanish-speaking streamer on Facebook today. She later expanded her social media presence by joining TikTok, where she participated in dance trends and shared GRWM (Get Ready With Me) content.

In 2022, Mua participated in the Veracruz Carnival with her then-partner, Brian Villegas. Together, they were chosen as kings of the Carnival, receiving more than two million votes. Additionally, in that same year, she was the host of the Pink Carpet at the 2022 MTV MIAW Awards. Then, in 2023, the influencer took on the role of presenter on the MTV program La venganza de los ex VIP.

In May 2023, Mua launched her own cosmetics line in collaboration with Beauty Creations, making her the first Mexican influencer to partner with this brand. Her line was available in renowned stores such as Sephora, marking a milestone in her career as an entrepreneur in the beauty industry.

In August 2023, Mua began her musical career with the release of her first single, "Chupón", reaching more than ninety-five million views on YouTube. Later, in October of the same year, she released her second single, "Con to'". In November 2023, she made her singing debut at Flow Fest, an event sponsored by Coca-Cola, before an audience of more than thirty thousand spectators. This achievement made her the first Mexican influencer and singer to perform at the Flow Fest event.

In June 2024, Mua signed a contract with Sony Music Mexico for the recording of her first album. Later, she participated in the Mexican program ¿Quién es la máscara?, playing the character Tutupotama. She reached the semifinals of the program before being eliminated.

== Public image and controversies ==
In March 2023, Yeri Mua sparked controversy for a Women's Day Instagram post featuring a black-and-white photo in lingerie with the slogan "Puta pero libre" (i.e., "slut but free") painted across her body. The post divided public opinion, drawing criticism for being perceived as tone-deaf in its approach to a serious commemorative day.

In May 2025, Mua generated significant controversy after publicly admitting in an interview that she had paid for a witchcraft ritual (amarre) using black magic to "tie" her ex-partner. She further described the details of the ritual and later claimed it had negative consequences on her life. The revelation went viral on social media and was covered by national press in Mexico.

In July 2025, Mua again attracted media attention after declaring in a livestream that she considered her skin tone to be "blanca Veracruz" (white Veracruz). The statement generated backlash, with critics describing it as a form of colorism and classism, while others mocked the phrase on social media.
