= La Venganza de los Ex VIP =

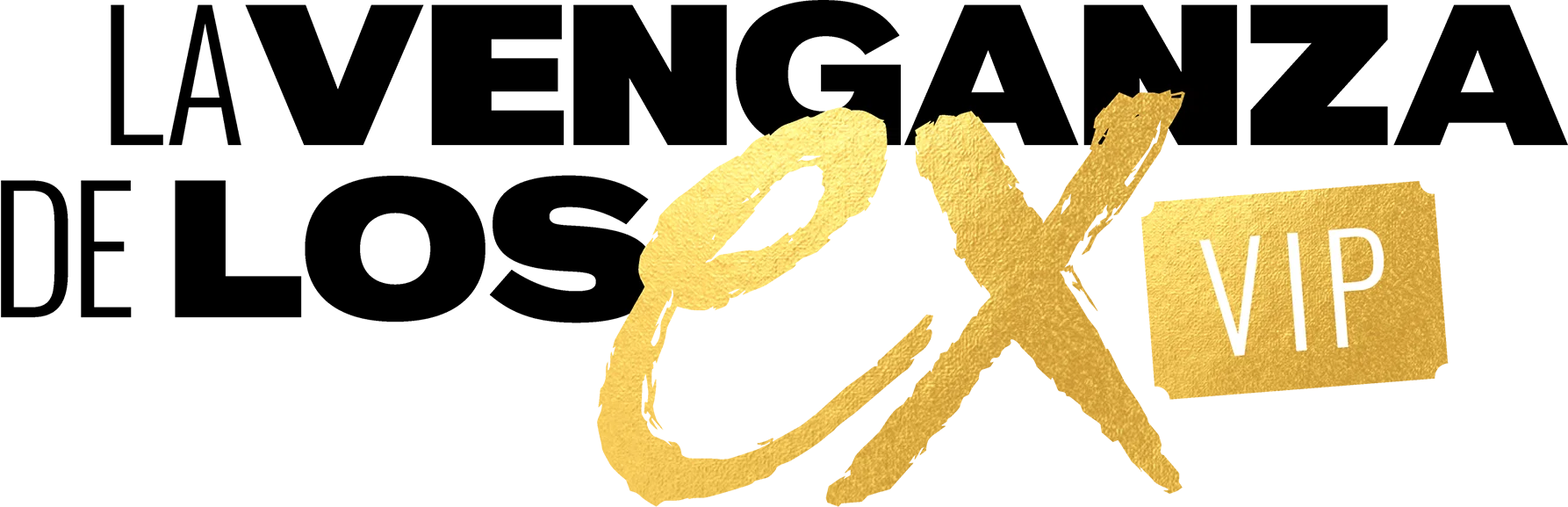
- Genre: Reality
- Created by: MTV
- Country of origin: Mexico
- Original language: Spanish
- No. of series: 5
- No. of episodes: 62

Production
- Running time: 50 minutes (excluding adverts)

Original release
- Network: Paramount+ MTV (until 2025)
- Release: 9 November 2021 – present

Related
- Ex on the Beach; Acapulco Shore; La Venganza de los Ex

La Venganza de los Ex VIP is a Mexican reality show that airs on Paramount+. The series was first announced in September 2021 and premiered on November 9, 2021. Follows the format of celebrities staying at a villa for a singles vacation while starting relationships, which are often interrupted by the arrival of their exes at different points in the series.

== Series overview ==
Series	Cast	Location	Episodes	Originally released	
Series	Cast	Location	Episodes	First released	Last released
1	22	Isla Barú, Colombia	12	9 November 2021	16 December 2021
2	21	Isla Barú, Colombia	12	24 January 2023	4 April 2023
3	25	Isla Barú, Colombia	12	5 December 2023	20 February 2024
4	23	Isla Barú, Colombia	13	18 March 2025	3 June 2025
5	23	Isla Barú, Colombia	13	10 February 2026	28 April 2026

== Seasons ==
=== Season 1 (2021) ===
On September 12, 2021, MTV Latin America announced a new edition of the show, which was filmed in Colombia, and premiered on 9 November 2021. This series is billed as "La Venganza de los Ex VIP" as, for the first time, it features a set of famous cast members.

=== Season 2 (2023) ===
The second season of the VIP version of the program premiered on January 24, 2022.

=== Season 3 (2023–2024) ===
In October 2023, MTV released the first teaser for the third season. On November 3, 2023 during the Upfront 2024 event, Paramount confirmed the show's premiere date through a content slate for 2024. However, He advanced the release date to December 5. 2023.

=== Season 4 (2025) ===
The fourth season of La Venganza de los Ex VIP premiered on March 18, 2025.

=== Season 5 (2026) ===
The fifth season of Ex on the Beach VIP premiered on February 10, 2026.
