= Josh Brolin =

American actor (born 1968)

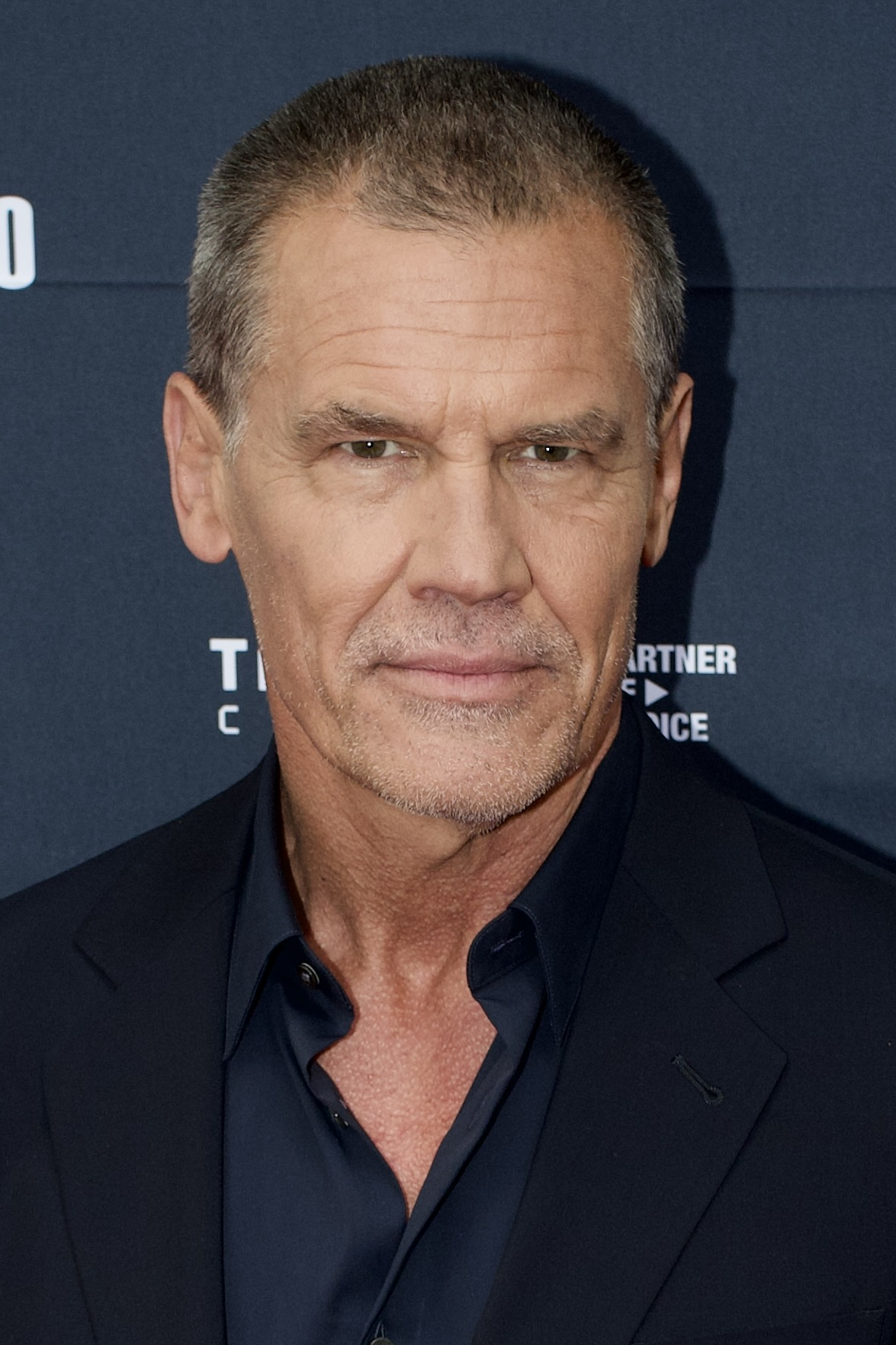
- Brolin at the 2025 Toronto International Film Festival
- Born: Josh James Brolin; February 12, 1968 (age 58); Santa Monica, California, U.S.
- Occupation: Actor
- Years active: 1977–present
- Works: Full list
- Spouses: Alice Adair (m. 1988; div. 1994); Diane Lane (m. 2004; div. 2013); Kathryn Boyd (m. 2016)
- Children: 4, including Eden Brolin
- Father: James Brolin
- Relatives: Barbra Streisand (stepmother); Jason Gould (stepbrother); Jan Smithers (former-stepmother)
- Awards: Full list

Josh James Brolin (/ˈbroʊlɪn/; born February 12, 1968) is an American actor. A son of actor James Brolin, he gained fame in his youth for his role in the adventure film The Goonies (1985). Brolin had a resurgence with his starring role in the crime film No Country for Old Men (2007). Brolin received a nomination for the Academy Award for Best Supporting Actor for portraying Dan White in the biopic Milk (2008).

Brolin's career progressed with roles in W. (2008), True Grit (2010), Wall Street: Money Never Sleeps (2010), Men in Black 3 (2012), Oldboy (2013), Inherent Vice (2014), Everest (2015), and Hail, Caesar! (2016). He gained wider recognition for playing Thanos in the Marvel Cinematic Universe (MCU), including in the films Avengers: Infinity War (2018) and Avengers: Endgame (2019), as well as Cable in Deadpool 2 (2018). Brolin also collaborated with filmmaker Denis Villeneuve in the action thriller Sicario (2015) and in the science fiction films Dune (2021), Dune: Part Two (2024), and Dune: Part Three (2026), in which he played Gurney Halleck. In 2019, he founded the production company Brolin Productions, whose first project was the crime comedy film Brothers (2024). He published his memoir From Under the Truck: A Decidedly Un-Celebrity Memoir from the Enigmatic Actor in 2024 through HarperCollins.

== Early life ==
Brolin was born on February 12, 1968, in Santa Monica, California, the son of actor James Brolin and Jane Cameron Agee, a casting director and wildlife activist. Brolin was raised on a ranch in the Adelaida area of Paso Robles, attending elementary and middle school in Templeton, California. Brolin moved to the Santa Barbara area around the age of 11, where he attended Santa Barbara High School. Brolin had little exposure to his father's acting career.

Brolin said in a 2014 interview that during his youth, he was a member of a surfing friendship group who called themselves the "Cito Rats". In his description of the group, Brolin said, "It was Santa Barbara. It was the '80s. It was punk rock. You either had the children of rich, neglectful parents or children of poor, so it was a mix. But we basically grew up the same way. I've never seen a group like that before or since." He admitted to stealing cars to pay for his drug use, which included heroin, a drug that he explained he did not like: "I mean, I never got into it and I never died from it, which is a good thing. I've had 19 friends who died. Most of those guys I grew up with, they're all dead now." Brolin later said: "The group of guys that I grew up with, 36 of them are dead. Twelve are in jail. Four are in jail and also dead. I keep careful count, all 36 dead guys. I'm from a tough environment, ya know?"

In a 2012 New York Times interview, he claimed to have been a member of Montecito hardcore band Rich Kids on LSD. He later gave more detail about this in a radio interview, stating "Things have gotten confused in interviews and all that. And I said that I was a part of RKL, which is Rich Kids on LSD, which was a big punk band back then. And it was - I was part of the garage band that first started playing. And then they went to be known with other drummers and other musicians as RKL. And they actually became a fairly well-known punk rock band.". On the podcast WTF with Marc Maron, he said Jason Sears was his best friend and has also stated "Rich Kids on LSD was the band that I helped start."

== Career ==
=== Early work and breakthrough (1980s) ===
Brolin started his career in TV films and guest roles on TV shows before landing a more notable role as Brandon Walsh in the Richard Donner-directed film The Goonies (1985). Brolin was considered for the role of Tom Hanson in the series 21 Jump Street; Brolin and Johnny Depp were the finalists for the role, and the two became close and remained friends. The role ultimately went to Depp. Brolin guest-starred in an episode of the show in its first season.

=== Career decline (1990–2006) ===
Brolin has implied that he turned away from film acting for years after the premiere of his second film, Thrashin', due to what he called his "horrendous" acting. As Brolin said later, "Flirting With Disaster (1996) was the first movie where I thought, 'Oh, thank God I got to do that one.' It's the first movie of mine where I wasn't watching my performance at all. I was just loving the movie." For several years, Brolin appeared in stage roles in Rochester, New York, often alongside mentor and friend Anthony Zerbe. One of Brolin's more prominent roles early in his career was that of Wild Bill Hickok in the ABC Western TV series The Young Riders, which lasted three seasons (1989–92). Two other TV series in which Brolin was involved include the Aaron Spelling production Winnetka Road (1994) and Mister Sterling (2003), both of which were cancelled after a few episodes.

=== Career resurgence and stardom (2006–2016) ===
By 2006, Brolin was trading stocks full time when he booked the lead role in the Coen brothers' Academy Award-winning film No Country for Old Men (2007). The film became a critical and commercial success. Brolin went on to book a part in the similarly successful Ridley Scott film American Gangster (2007).

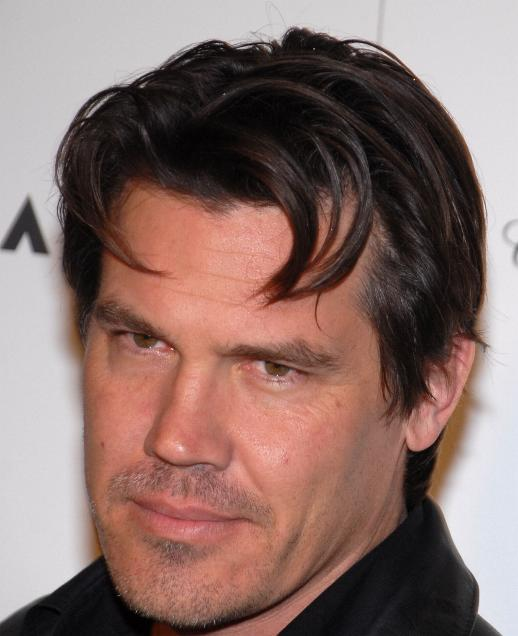
Brolin in 2007

In 2008, Brolin starred in the Oliver Stone film, W., a biopic about key events in the life of George W. Bush. Stone pursued an initially hesitant Brolin for the role. He said of his decision to cast Brolin in the leading role:

It always seemed to me that he was the right person. Although classically handsome, I think he would consider himself a character actor first and foremost, and it was in this context that I thought of him as W. Josh certainly has star appeal and could be a leading man, but I don't think he necessarily wants to be that. I think he really enjoys disappearing into a character.

Brolin received an Oscar nomination for Best Supporting Actor for his role in Gus Van Sant's biopic Milk as city supervisor Dan White, who assassinated San Francisco Supervisor Harvey Milk and Mayor George Moscone. He made news by wearing a White Knot to the Academy Awards ceremony to demonstrate solidarity with the same-sex marriage movement. Brolin told an interviewer that co-star Sean Penn, who portrayed Milk, decided to dispel any nerves the actors had about playing gay men by "grabbing the bull by the horns". At the first cast dinner, which included castmates James Franco, Emile Hirsch, and Diego Luna, "[Penn] walked right up and grabbed me and planted a huge one right on my lips", Brolin said. Brolin has received critical acclaim for his performance, and in addition to his Oscar nomination, received New York Film Critics Circle and National Board of Review awards for Best Supporting Actor and a nomination for a Screen Actors Guild Award for Outstanding Performance by a Male Actor in a Supporting Role.

Also in 2008, Brolin hosted Saturday Night Live, the same night as musical guest Adele. He hosted again in April 2012 and March 2024.

In 2009, Brolin executive produced and performed in The People Speak, a documentary feature film that uses dramatic and musical performances of the letters, diaries, and speeches of everyday Americans, based on historian Howard Zinn's A People's History of the United States. The next year, Brolin wrote and directed the short film X as his directorial debut. The film is about an inmate who escapes prison to reunite with his daughter and searches for her murdered mother. It was the opening film at the first annual Union City International Film Festival in Union City, New Jersey, in December 2010.

In the early 2010s, Brolin appeared in a variety of big-budget studio films. He portrayed the titular character in Jonah Hex (2010), based on the DC Comics' character with the same name. Brolin later admitted that he hated the experience making the film, stating that at one point they had to "[reshoot] 66 pages in 12 days", implying that the filming schedule was hectic. Brolin later blamed the film's failure on studio interference in the film's postproduction and on director Jimmy Hayward, whom he called "inexperienced" and a "bad choice (of director)." Brolin also appeared in the Coen Brothers' film True Grit (2010) and in Oliver Stone's Wall Street: Money Never Sleeps (2010).

In 2012, Brolin played the younger version of Tommy Lee Jones's character Kevin Brown/Agent K in Men in Black 3, which reunited both Brolin and Jones after their initial collaboration in No Country for Old Men and In the Valley of Elah, both in 2007. Brolin later starred in the 2013 film Gangster Squad, portraying a fictional World War II veteran named John O'Mara. Later that year, Brolin also portrayed Joe Doucett in Oldboy, a remake of the 2003 South Korean film of the same name. He went on to various roles in other films including Paul Thomas Anderson's comedy-drama Inherent Vice (2014), the crime film Sicario (2015), the survival film Everest (2015), and the Coen brothers' comedy film Hail, Caesar! (2016). In 2014, Brolin was announced to play Thanos within the Marvel Cinematic Universe. He portrays the character through motion capture performance and voice acting. Brolin cameoed as the character in Guardians of the Galaxy (2014) and Avengers: Age of Ultron (2015).

=== Franchise roles (2016–present) ===
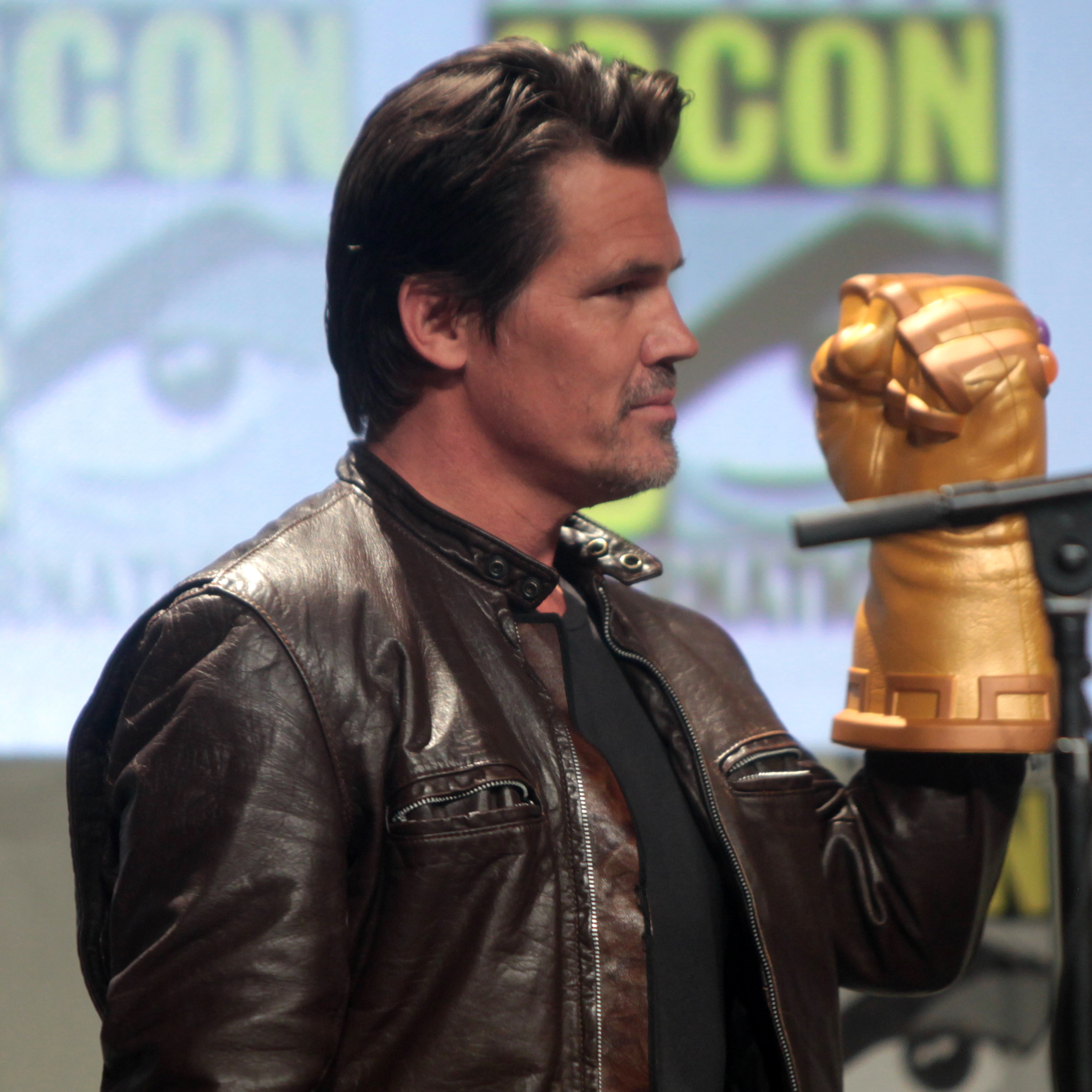
Brolin promoting the film Avengers Age of Ultron at the 2014 San Diego Comic-Con

Brolin reprised his role as Thanos in a starring role in Avengers: Infinity War (2018) and 2019's Avengers: Endgame, which were filmed back-to-back. His performance in the role was critically acclaimed. Writing for Variety, critic Owen Gleiberman called Brolin's motion-capture performance in Infinity War "supremely effective" and said, "Brolin infuses Thanos with his slit-eyed manipulative glower, so that the evil in this movie never feels less than personal." Writing for the Hollywood Reporter, critic Todd McCarthy similarly said, "Brolin's calm, considered reading of the character bestows this conquering beast with an unexpectedly resonant emotional dimension, making him much more than a thick stick figure of a supervillain."

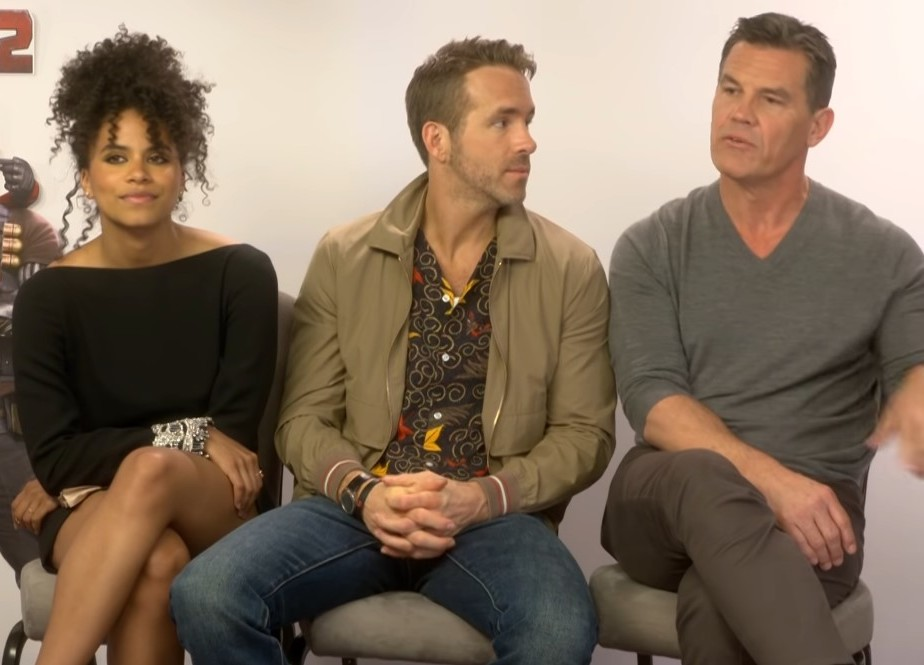
Zazie Beetz, Ryan Reynolds, and Brolin during an interview in 2018

In April 2017, Brolin signed a four-film contract with 20th Century Fox studios to portray the Marvel Comics character Nathan Summers/Cable in the X-Men film series. Deadpool 2 (2018) was his first installment within that contract. He was set to reprise his role in Fox's planned X-Force movie until the acquisition of 20th Century Fox by Disney. In February 2019, Brolin joined the cast of Denis Villeneuve's Dune as Gurney Halleck.

In 2021, Brolin voiced an alternate Thanos in What If...? series. In October of that year, Dune premiered to generally positive reviews. In April 2022, Brolin starred as Royal Abbot in the Amazon Prime Video series Outer Range. He also served as an executive producer.

In March 2024, Dune: Part Two premiered to rave reviews. The second season of Outer Range appeared on May 16, with Brolin reprising his role and directing an episode. In 2025, Brolin starred in a leading role in Zach Cregger's horror film Weapons, replacing Pedro Pascal; the film released in August to critical acclaim. Later in the year, he is starring as the antagonist in Edgar Wright's The Running Man, an adaptation of Stephen King's 1982 novel, as well as Rian Johnson's Wake Up Dead Man: A Knives Out Mystery.

Brolin has been cast in Ridley Scott's The Dog Stars, as well as Brian Duffield's film adaptation of Daniel Kraus' 2023 novel Whalefall, the latter reuniting him with Weapons costar Austin Abrams. He will also reprise his role as Gurney Halleck in Villeneuve's third and final Dune film. All three projects are slated for release in 2026.

== Personal life ==
=== Marriages and children ===
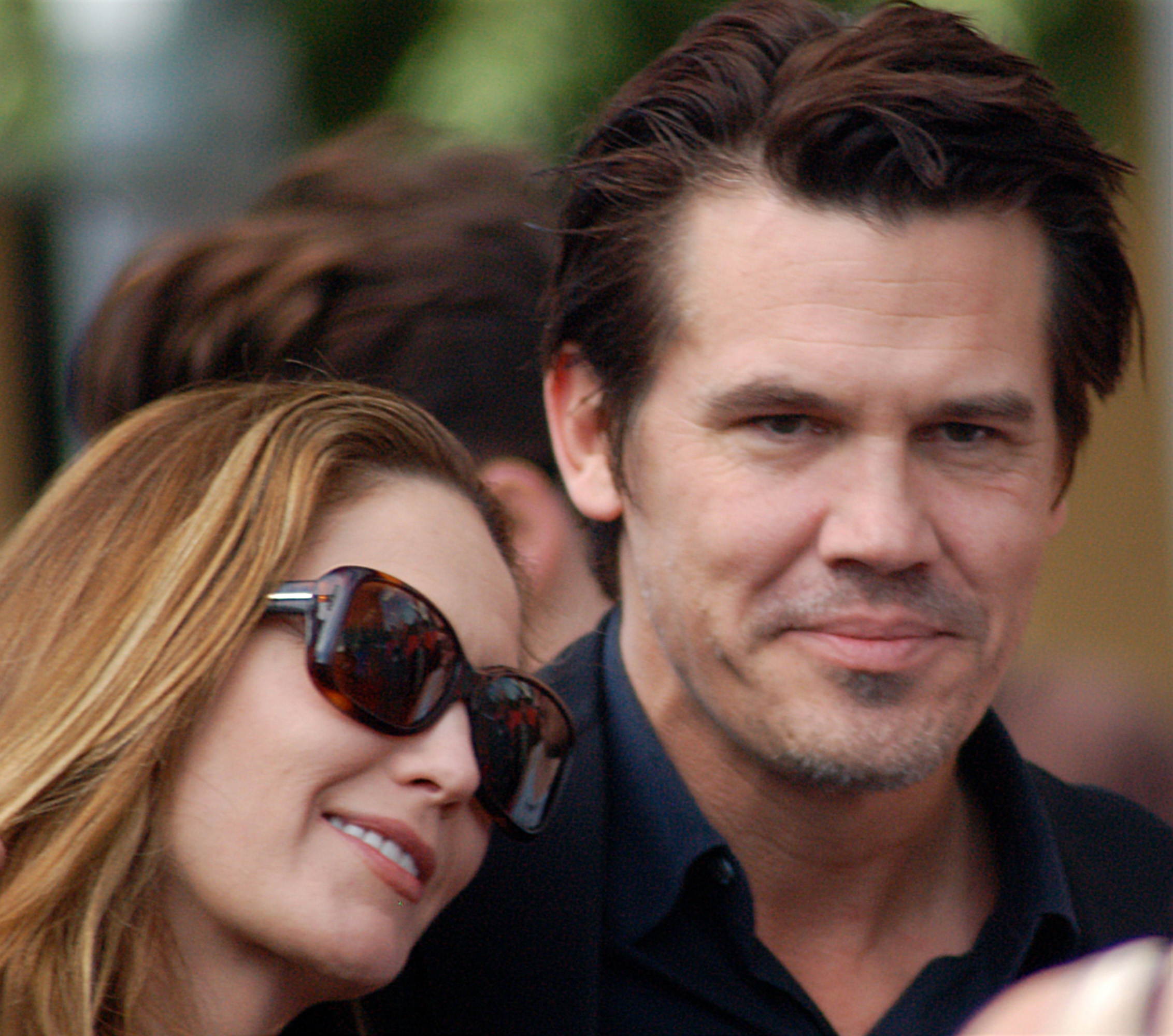
Brolin and his then-wife Diane Lane in 2009

Brolin was married to actress Alice Adair from 1988 until 1994; they have two children, including Eden. He was engaged to actress Minnie Driver for six months. Brolin married actress Diane Lane on August 15, 2004. They divorced in 2013.

In March 2013, Brolin began dating his former assistant and model Kathryn Boyd. They became engaged in March 2015. The couple married on September 24, 2016, and announced on May 29, 2018, that they were expecting their first child. Brolin announced through Instagram on November 4, 2018, that Boyd had given birth to a daughter. Their second daughter was born on December 25, 2020.

=== Arrests ===
On December 20, 2004, Brolin's wife at the time, Diane Lane, called the police after an altercation with him, and Brolin was arrested on a misdemeanor charge of domestic battery. Lane declined to press charges and the couple's spokesman characterized the incident as a misunderstanding.

On July 12, 2008, Brolin was arrested after an altercation at the Stray Cat Bar in Shreveport, Louisiana, along with actor Jeffrey Wright and five other men who were crew members of W. Brolin was released after posting a cash bond of $334. He said to a reporter, "It was nice to be in jail knowing that I hadn't done anything wrong. And it was maddening to be in jail knowing that I hadn't done anything wrong." Charges against all seven men were later dropped by Shreveport prosecutors.

Brolin was arrested for public intoxication on New Year's Day 2013 in Santa Monica, California. The remainder of 2013 proved very difficult for him, and Brolin later explained: "Well, it was another turning point. It made me think of a lot of things. My mom dying when I was in my 20s. All the impact that had on me that I hadn't moved past; I was always such a mama's boy. But I realized that I was on a destructive path. I knew that I had to change and mature." Brolin has been sober from alcohol since 2013.

=== Business interests ===
Brolin started stock trading in his mid-20s and considered quitting acting. In 2014, Brolin explained that he made a large amount of money over a three-year period: "Fear and greed, that's all that there is. And I traded very specifically. I found momentum stocks that had room to breathe and I just grab a little of the breath." Brolin was also co-founder of a now-defunct stock-trading website called MarketProbability.

== Bibliography ==
- Brolin, Josh J. (2024). From Under the Truck: A Memoir. New York, USA: HarperCollins Publishers. ISBN 978-0063382183.
