= Josh Brolin filmography =

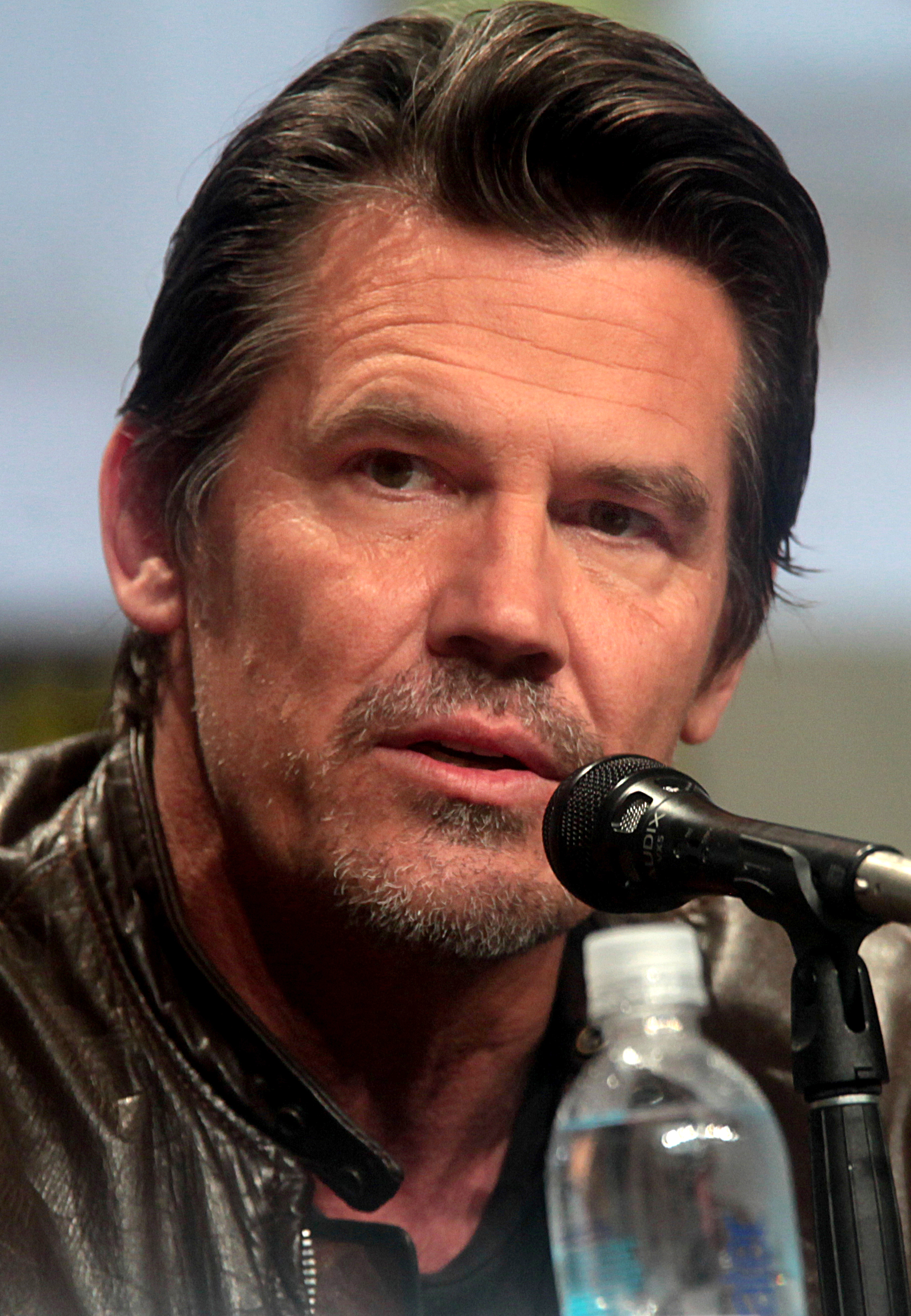
Brolin at the 2014 San Diego Comic-Con

Josh Brolin (born 1968) is an American actor. Brolin has appeared in films such as The Goonies (1985), Mimic (1997), Hollow Man (2000), Coastlines (2002), Grindhouse (2007), No Country for Old Men (2007), American Gangster (2007), W. (2008), Milk (2008), Jonah Hex (2010), True Grit (2010), Men in Black 3 (2012), Oldboy (2013), Labor Day (2013), Inherent Vice (2014), Sicario (2015), Hail, Caesar! (2016), Only the Brave (2017), Avengers: Infinity War (2018), Deadpool 2 (2018), Avengers: Endgame (2019), Dune (2021), Dune: Part Two (2024), Weapons (2025), Wake Up Dead Man (2025), The Running Man (2025), The Dog Stars (2026), Whalefall (2026).

== Film ==
Key
†	Denotes productions that have not yet been released

Year	Title	Role	Notes	Ref.
1985	The Goonies	Brandon "Brand" Walsh		
1986	Thrashin'	Corey Webster		
1987	Prison for Children	Boise	Television film	
1989	Finish Line	Glenn Shrevelow	Television film	
1994	The Road Killers	Tom		
1996	Bed of Roses	Danny		
1996	Flirting with Disaster	Tony Kent		
1997	Mimic	Josh		
1997	My Brother's War	Pete		
1997	Nightwatch	James Gallman		
1997	Gang in Blue	Keith DeBruler	Television film	
1999	The Mod Squad	Billy Waites		
1999	Best Laid Plans	Bryce		
1999	It's the Rage	Tennel		
2000	Picnic	Hal Carter	Television film	
2000	Hollow Man	Matthew Kensington		
2000	Slow Burn	Duster	Direct-to-DVD	
2002	Coastlines	Sheriff Dave Lockhart		
2003	Milwaukee, Minnesota	Gary		
2004	Melinda and Melinda	Greg		
2005	Into the Blue	Bates		
2006	The Dead Girl	Tarlow		
2007	Grindhouse	Dr. William Block	Segment: Planet Terror	
2007	In the Valley of Elah	Chief Buchwald		
2007	No Country for Old Men	Llewelyn Moss		
2007	To Each His Own Cinema	Cowboy	Segment: "World Cinema"	
2007	American Gangster	Detective Trupo		
2008	W.	George W. Bush		
2008	Milk	Dan White		
2009	Women in Trouble	Nick Chapel		
2009	The People Speak	Himself	Documentary; also producer	
2010	Jonah Hex	Jonah Hex		
2010	The Tillman Story	Narrator	Documentary	
2010	You Will Meet a Tall Dark Stranger	Roy		
2010	Wall Street: Money Never Sleeps	Bretton James		
2010	True Grit	Tom Chaney		
2012	Men in Black 3	Young Agent K		
2012	Radioman	Himself	Documentary	
2013	Gangster Squad	Sgt. John O'Mara		
2013	Oldboy	Joe Doucett		
2013	Labor Day	Frank		
2013	Hawaiian: The Legend of Eddie Aikau	Narrator	Documentary	
2014	Sin City: A Dame to Kill For	Dwight McCarthy		
2014	Guardians of the Galaxy	Thanos	Uncredited	
2014	Inherent Vice	Lt. Det. Christian F. "Bigfoot" Bjornsen		
2015	Avengers: Age of Ultron	Thanos	Cameo; uncredited	
2015	Sicario	Matt Graver		
2015	Everest	Beck Weathers		
2016	Hail, Caesar!	Eddie Mannix		
2016	Unchained: The Untold Story of Freestyle Motocross	Narrator	Documentary	
2017	Suburbicon	Baseball Coach	Deleted scenes	
2017	Only the Brave	Eric Marsh		
2018	The Legacy of a Whitetail Deer Hunter	Buck Ferguson		
2018	Avengers: Infinity War	Thanos		
2018	Deadpool 2	Nathan Summers/Cable		
2018	Sicario: Day of the Soldado	Matt Graver		
2019	Avengers: Endgame	Thanos		
2021	Flag Day	Uncle Beck		
2021	Dune	Gurney Halleck		
2024	Dune: Part Two	Gurney Halleck		
2024	Brothers	Moke Munger	Also producer	
2025	Weapons	Archer Graff	Also executive producer	
2025	Wake Up Dead Man	Msgr. Jefferson Wicks		
2025	The Running Man	Dan Killian		
2026	The Dog Stars	Bangley		
2026	Whalefall	Mitt Gardiner		
2026	Dune: Part Three †	Gurney Halleck	Post-production	

== Television ==
Year	Title	Role	Notes
1986	Highway to Heaven	Josh Bryant	Episode: "A Special Love - Part 2"
1987–1988	Private Eye	Johnny Betz	12 episodes
1987	21 Jump Street	Taylor Rolator	Episode: "My Future's So Bright, I Gotta Wear Shades"
1989–1992	The Young Riders	James Butler Hickok	67 episodes
1994	Winnetka Road	Jack Passion	6 episodes
1995	The Outer Limits	Jack Pierce	Episode: "Virtual Future"
2003	Mister Sterling	Senator Bill Sterling	10 episodes
2005	Into the West	Jedediah Smith	Episode: "Wheel to the Stars"
2008–2024	Saturday Night Live	Himself / Host	3 episodes
2012	Mankind: The Story of All of Us	Narrator	12 episodes
2021–2024	What If...?	Thanos	Voice role; 3 episodes: "What If... T'Challa Became a Star-Lord?", "What If... Iron Man Crashed Into the Grandmaster?", "What If... Howard the Duck Got Hitched?"
2022–2024	Outer Range	Royal Abbott	Lead role, Director (episode: "Do-Si-Do")
2025	The American Revolution	General George Washington	Voice; miniseries

== Stage ==
Year	Title	Role	Venue	Notes	Ref(s)
2000	True West	Austin (replacement)	Circle in the Square Theatre	Replaced Philip Seymour Hoffman (June 21 – July 29)	
