= Angel Down =

Angel Down may refer to:

- Angel Down (album), a 2007 album by Sebastian Bach
- "Angel Down" (song), a 2016 song by Lady Gaga
- Angel Down (novel), a 2025 novel by Daniel Kraus

== See also ==
- Angel, Angel, Down We Go, a 1969 American film
