= Angel Down (novel) =

2025 World War I novel by Daniel Kraus

- 2025 book jacket
- Author: Daniel Kraus
- Audio read by: Kirby Heyborne
- Genre: Paranormal fiction, Thrillers
- Set in: Meuse–Argonne offensive, France
- Published: July 2025
- Publisher: First Atria Books
- Publication place: United States
- Media type: Print, E-book, Audio
- Pages: 304
- Awards: See "Awards" section below
- ISBN: 9781668068458
- OCLC: 1460930642
- Website: Official website

Angel Down (2025) is a World War I novel, written as a single unbroken sentence, by American author Daniel Kraus. The protagonist is a draft dodger and then an army private who encounters an angel on the battlefield. It was published by Atria Books, an imprint of Simon & Schuster, in July 2025. It won the 2026 Pulitzer Prize for Fiction.

== Premise ==
Five American soldiers near the end of World War I, during the Meuse-Argonne offensive, are on a bloody battlefield in France. Major General Reis, who is focused on his own advancement, orders an infantryman, Private First Class Cyril Bagger to investigate an unearthly shrieking sound that is causing the troops to go insane. Bagger is sent out with four other soldiers, a group of misfits. First there is Arno, who is young and innocent. Next is Popkin who is very much a brute. Then there is Goodspeed who is nervously "squirming," and Veck, who is suffering from severe shell shock.

The five men discover the source of the sound is an angel, and she looks like women that each of the men recognize. She is tangled in barbed wire and emitting a very bright aura. They believe Major General Reis will try to exploit the angel for his own benefit and career advancement. Determined to keep her away from Reis, the soldiers desert their post. They carry the angel, dodging artillery fire while arguing with each other. Each man tries to gain favor with the angel hoping she will grant their personal wishes.

== Writing style ==
According to Publishers Weekly, Kraus builds the tension with the rhythm of his writing, creating a sense of non-stop action because the entire story is a single sentence. Despite the pacing, the writing is also poetic, as there are lyrical passages like "Bagger sits up with vision aswirl and shoos away the filthy pelt of air, the pigeon-gray smoke and eyeball-white fog". Ben H. Winters of The New York Times says that this novel starts at the outset in the middle of a sentence and in the middle of a battle, while the narrative ends in a comma indicating that there is no conclusion, only continuation.

Winters also says that the text shows an exemplary example of the "additive style", in which the "writer's prose is associative and spontaneous, piling up new facts and ideas without necessarily spelling out their relationships. The additive style — as distinct from the precise and ordered subordinating style — suggests that the relationship between events, their quote-unquote 'meaning,' is as uncertain in stories as it is in life."

According to Kirkus Reviews, Kraus structured the entire novel as one extended run-on sentence, broken up only by paragraph indentation. This structure works by "giving the story a relentless and intense rhythm."

== Themes ==
Kirkus Reviews says that in the realm of horror, the novel vividly portrays the violence, and blood and guts of the battlefield. This continuous run-on sentence structure is applied to "keep a story moving." According to Kirkus Reviews, the latter part of the book asks philosophical questions about: Why people seem naturally inclined to wage war. What force or idea might be strong enough to stop this cycle of conflict. Charlie Jane Anders, reviewing the book for The Washington Post said, "...Angel Down jabs at the relationship between religion and patriotism, and the ways they combine to drive people into the meat-grinder of war.

== Reception ==
According to Publishers Weekly, the novel is a vigorous and fresh take on the war novel genre. Winters, of The New York Times says, "Angel Down, mysterious and full of grace, may work a similar power on its readers, even as it walks the fields of death." In awarding the novel the Pulitzer Prize for Fiction, the Pulitzer Board described it as a "breathless novel of World War I, a stylistic tour-de-force that blends such genres as allegory, magical realism and science fiction into a cohesive whole, told in a single sentence."

== Awards ==
In 2025, this received recognition from the following publications:

- New York Times Top 10 Books of 2025
- People Magazine Best Books of 2025
- New York Times Notable Book of 2025
- Vulture Magazine's Best Books of 2025
- New York Times Editors' Choice
- Financial Times Best Book of 2025
- Vulture – The 16 Best Horror Books of 2025
- Chicago Review of Books – 12 Must-Read Books of July 2025
- Pulitzer Prize for Fiction (2026)

== Film adaptation ==
In January 2026, a film adaptation was announced to be in development at Imagine Entertainment, who produced a film adaptation of Kraus's previous novel Whalefall.

== See also ==
- Ducks, Newburyport
- The Gates of Paradise (novel)
- Dancing Lessons for the Advanced in Age
