= List of awards and nominations received by Josh Brolin =

Josh Brolin awards and nominations
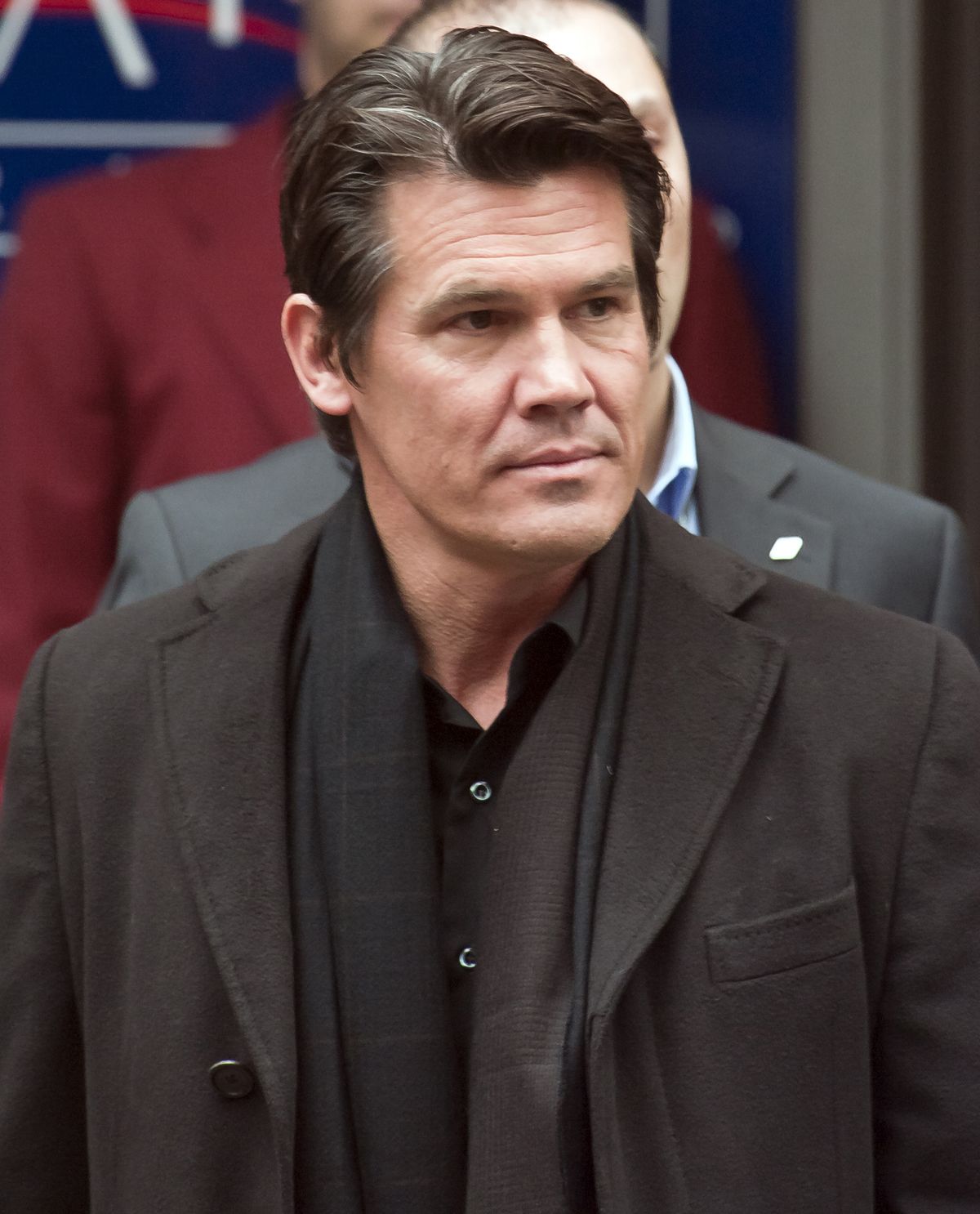
- Brolin at the 2011 Berlin International Film Festival
Awards and nominations
Award	Wins	Nominations
Academy Awards	0	1
Actor Awards	1	4
Critics' Choice Awards	1	4
Film Independent Spirit Awards	1	1

Totals (Note: Certain award groups do not simply award one winner. They acknowledge several different recipients, have runners-up, and have third place. Since this is a specific recognition and is different from losing an award, runner-up mentions are considered wins in this award tally. For simplification and to avoid errors, each award in this list has been presumed to have had a prior nomination.)
- Wins: 19
- Nominations: 57

Josh Brolin is an American actor who has received various awards and nominations throughout his career.

In 2007, Brolin won an Actor Award for Outstanding Performance by a Cast in a Motion Picture for the neo-Western thriller film No Country for Old Men. In 2008, he portrayed the American politician Dan White in the movie Milk, which earned him an Academy Award nomination for Best Supporting Actor, as well as wins for a Critics' Choice Award for Best Acting Ensemble, and for a National Board of Review Award and a New York Film Critics Circle Award for Best Supporting Actor. His performance as the U.S. president George W. Bush in the film W. (2008) earned him nominations at the London Film Critics' Circle Awards and Satellite Awards. In 2014, he collaborated with Paul Thomas Anderson in the film Inherent Vice, for which he received an Independent Spirit Robert Altman Award shared with the cast and crew, and a nomination for the Critics' Choice Movie Award for Best Supporting Actor.

From 2014 to 2019, Brolin portrayed Thanos in the Marvel Cinematic Universe, for which he won a Saturn Award, an MTV Movie & TV Award, and two Washington D.C. Area Film Critics Association Awards among others.

== Awards and nominations ==
Awards and nominations received by Josh Brolin
Award	Year	Nominated work	Category	Result	Ref.
Academy Awards	2009	Milk	Best Supporting Actor	Nominated	
Actor Awards	2008	American Gangster	Outstanding Performance by a Cast in a Motion Picture (Note: shared with the cast of the respective film)	Nominated	
Actor Awards	2008	No Country for Old Men	Outstanding Performance by a Cast in a Motion Picture	Won	
Actor Awards	2009	Milk	Outstanding Performance by a Male Actor in a Supporting Role	Nominated	
Actor Awards	2009	Milk	Outstanding Performance by a Cast in a Motion Picture	Nominated	
Austin Film Critics Association Awards	2019	Avengers: Infinity War	Best Motion Capture/Special Effects Performance	Won	
Austin Film Critics Association Awards	2020	Avengers: Endgame	Best Motion Capture/Special Effects Performance	Won	
Blockbuster Entertainment Awards	2001	Hollow Man	Favorite Supporting Actor – Science Fiction	Nominated	
Chicago Film Critics Association Awards	2014	Inherent Vice	Best Supporting Actor	Nominated	
Critics' Choice Awards	2008	No Country for Old Men	Best Acting Ensemble	Nominated	
Critics' Choice Awards	2009	Milk	Best Supporting Actor	Nominated	
Critics' Choice Awards	2009	Milk	Best Acting Ensemble	Won	
Critics' Choice Awards	2015	Inherent Vice	Best Supporting Actor	Nominated	
Critics' Choice Super Awards	2026	Weapons	Best Actor in a Horror Movie	Pending	
Dallas–Fort Worth Film Critics Association Awards	2008	Milk	Best Supporting Actor	Nominated	
Detroit Film Critics Society Awards	2008	W.	Best Actor	Nominated	
Detroit Film Critics Society Awards	2014	Inherent Vice	Best Supporting Actor	Nominated	
Dublin Film Critics' Circle Awards	2008	W.	Best Actor	Nominated	
Film Independent Spirit Awards	2015	Inherent Vice	Robert Altman Award	Won	
Golden Raspberry Awards	2011	Jonah Hex	Worst Screen Couple (Note: shared with Megan Fox)	Nominated	
Hollywood Critics Association Awards	2019	Avengers: Infinity War	Best Animated or VFX Performance	Won	
Hollywood Critics Association Awards	2020	Avengers: Endgame	Best Animated or VFX Performance	Nominated	
Hollywood Film Awards	2008	W.	Best Actor	Won	
Houston Film Critics Society Awards	2008	Milk	Best Supporting Actor	Nominated	
Houston Film Critics Society Awards	2015	Inherent Vice	Best Supporting Actor	Nominated	
IFTA Film & Drama Awards	2009	W.	Best International Actor	Nominated	
International Cinephile Society Awards	2009	Milk	Best Supporting Actor	Nominated	
London Film Critics' Circle Awards	2009	W.	Actor of the Year	Nominated	
MovieGuide Awards	2017	Hail, Caesar!	Most Inspiring Performance for Movies	Nominated	
MTV Movie & TV Awards	2018	Avengers: Infinity War	Best Villain	Nominated	
MTV Movie & TV Awards	2019	Avengers: Endgame	Best Villain	Won	
MTV Movie & TV Awards	2019	Avengers: Endgame	Best Fight (Note: shared with Chris Evans)	Nominated	
National Board of Review Awards	2008	No Country for Old Men	Best Cast	Won	
National Board of Review Awards	2009	Milk	Best Supporting Actor	Won	
National Society of Film Critics Awards	2009	Milk	Best Supporting Actor	Nominated	
New York Film Critics Circle Awards	2009	Milk	Best Supporting Actor	Won	
Online Film Critics Society Awards	2014	Inherent Vice	Best Supporting Actor	Nominated	
Satellite Awards	2007	No Country for Old Men	Best Actor in a Motion Picture – Drama	Nominated	
Satellite Awards	2008	W.	Best Actor in a Motion Picture – Comedy or Musical	Nominated	
Satellite Awards	2026	Wake Up Dead Man	Best Cast – Motion Picture	Won	
Saturn Awards	2015	Inherent Vice	Best Supporting Actor	Nominated	
Saturn Awards	2019	Avengers: Infinity War	Best Supporting Actor	Won	
Saturn Awards	2025	Dune: Part Two	Best Supporting Actor	Nominated	
Seattle Film Critics Society Awards	2018	Avengers: Infinity War	Best Villain	Nominated	
St. Louis Gateway Film Critics Association Awards	2007	No Country for Old Men	Best Supporting Actor	Nominated	
St. Louis Gateway Film Critics Association Awards	2008	Milk	Best Supporting Actor	Nominated	
St. Louis Gateway Film Critics Association Awards	2014	Inherent Vice	Best Supporting Actor	Nominated	
Teen Choice Awards	2012	Men in Black 3	Choice Chemistry (Note: shared with Will Smith)	Nominated	
Teen Choice Awards	2018	Avengers: Infinity War	Choice Villain	Nominated	
Teen Choice Awards	2019	Avengers: Endgame	Choice Villain	Won	
Toronto Film Critics Association Awards	2008	Milk	Best Supporting Actor	Runner-up	
Toronto Film Critics Association Awards	2014	Inherent Vice	Best Supporting Actor	Runner-up	
Vancouver Film Critics Circle Awards	2009	Milk	Best Supporting Actor	Nominated	
Washington D.C. Area Film Critics Association Awards	2018	Avengers: Infinity War	Best Motion Capture Performance	Won	
Washington D.C. Area Film Critics Association Awards	2019	Avengers: Endgame	Best Motion Capture Performance	Won	
Western Heritage Awards	2011	True Grit	Theatrical Motion Picture	Won	
