= The Living Dead (novel) =

2020 novel by George A. Romero and Daniel Kraus

- Author: George A. Romero; Daniel Kraus
- Language: English
- Genre: Horror
- Publisher: Tor Books
- Publication date: August 4, 2020
- Publication place: United States
- Media type: Print (hardcover)
- Pages: 656
- ISBN: 9781250305121

The Living Dead is a 2020 horror novel written by George A. Romero and Daniel Kraus. The book was unfinished at Romero's death in 2017 and Kraus was hired to complete it using Romero's notes and incorporating an old short story by Romero.

== Plot ==
In San Diego, medical examiners Luis Acocella and Charlie Ratajkowski perform an autopsy on a Jane Doe who suddenly comes back from the dead. Luis contacts his superior, J.T., who tells them that the dead are rising across the country before committing suicide. A man named Richard Lindhof answers the phone, whose callous reaction disturbs Luis and Charlie. Meanwhile, Missourian teenager Greer Morgan watches the events unfold outside her mobile home, and Atlantan news producer Nathan Baseman and anchor Chuck Corso reveal what's happening globally.

Off the coast of California, Navy officer Karl Nishimura, who hopes to reunite with his family in Buffalo, escapes a crazed chaplain who commandeers a aircraft carrier after the carrier's crew commits suicide. Karl escapes in an airplane and lands in Mexico. Back in Atlanta, a deranged survivor group infiltrates the news studio and cause it to be overrun by the dead, which leads to Baseman committing suicide on air.

Etta Hoffman, a survivor in Washington D.C., stakes out in a fortified government facility where she alters government websites to receive information on humanity's survival. In San Diego, Luis and Charlie survive in Luis' home, where Luis is bitten by his undead mother. Sometime later, Greer, now in Canada, survives with her lover Muse King, a formerly famous musician who lives a pacifistic life. The two become known as "the Lion and the Dove", inspired by Greer's archery skills and Muse's pacifism used to overthrow abhorrent survivor colonies. Corso, who survived the attack, begins going by "the Face" due to the horrible facial wounds suffered and moves to Canada.

Some years later, Anita Taylor, a zombie and one of Etta's former coworkers, has shambled west to reach Tonda Mayhew at the La Brea Tar Pits. Etta is noticed by a faction in Toronto, led by Charlie, now known as "Snoop." Charlie takes Etta to their non-violent, vegetarian community in Fort York. After Luis' death, Charlie and Luis' wife, Rosa, travelled together before being captured by a group of violent survivalists with an extreme misogynistic philosophy. She had escaped to Fort York, where she leads the community alongside Karl Nishimura. Fort York, which relies on enslaved zombie labor, allows older zombies to live in a fortified section of the city called Slowtown. Other residents of Fort York include Greer, Muse, and the Face.

Fort York falls into a state of unrest and dissent due to the recent arrival of Richard Lindholf, who begins advocating for a harsher existence. Greer, Etta, Charlie, Karl, and the Face patrol Slowtown for old zombies they can transfer to hospice care, formed to practice mercy after years of violence. Greer abandons the patrol to look for Muse, who has gone missing. A docile zombie leads Greer to Muse, and Muse tells her that the zombies are becoming peaceful. Charlie finds the docile zombie, whom she believes to be her mother, and is bitten. She is rushed back to Fort York, where they find Lindholf inciting a mob to kill four prisoners that Karl pushed to release. Lindholf intends to lead the decimation of Slowtown, but Greer kills him.

The Face and Greer find Karl dying, having been thrown in a well by the mob. The Face and Greer meet the mob at Slowtown, where Muse leads the zombies in a non-violent protest. Despite the zombies peacefully following Muse, the mob brutally slaughters him, the horde, and Greer. Etta and Charlie escape Fort York to Lake Ontario, where they see men from Fort Drum coming to conquer Fort York.

Annie Taylor makes her way to the Tar Pits, where she reunites with Tonda Mayhew. Together, they sink into the tar and die.

== Reception ==
Kirkus Reviews gave the novel a positive review calling it "a spectacular horror epic". The Times called the book "everything you could have hoped for".
