= Whalefall (film) =

2026 film by Brian Duffield

- Theatrical release poster
- Directed by: Brian Duffield
- Screenplay by: Brian Duffield; Daniel Kraus
- Based on: Whalefall by Daniel Kraus
- Produced by: Brian Grazer; Brian Duffield; Jeb Brody; Allan Mandelbaum
- Starring: Austin Abrams; Josh Brolin; Elisabeth Shue; John Ortiz
- Cinematography: Aaron Morton
- Edited by: Pietro Scalia
- Music by: Joseph Trapanese
- Production companies: Imagine Entertainment; Jurassic Party Productions
- Distributed by: 20th Century Studios
- Release dates: October 5, 2026 (London); October 16, 2026 (United States)
- Running time: 106 minutes
- Country: United States
- Language: English
- Budget: $60 million
- Box office: $39.7 million

Whalefall is a 2026 American survival thriller film directed and produced by Brian Duffield, based on the 2023 novel by Daniel Kraus, who co-wrote the script with Duffield. The film follows a scuba diver (Austin Abrams) who, while searching for the remains of his estranged father (Josh Brolin), is swallowed alive by a sperm whale and attempts to escape. Elisabeth Shue and John Ortiz also star in supporting roles.

Whalefall premiered on October 5, 2026 at Cineworld in Leicester Square, London, and was theatrically released in the United States by 20th Century Studios on October 16. The film received middling reviews from critics and has grossed $39.7 million at the box office.

== Plot ==
Mitt Gardiner, a local dive-boat captain, is diagnosed with terminal mesothelioma. Refusing to succumb to the disease, he opts to commit suicide by drowning at Central California's Monastery Beach. Leaving sealed farewell letters for his wife and three children in a cooler aboard his boat, he attaches diving weights to himself and jumps into the ocean. His body is never recovered, and his family holds a funeral with an empty casket.

One year later, Mitt's youngest child, Jay Gardiner, returns to California from university in Iowa. Struggling with his father's death, Jay reflects on their strained relationship and his refusal to speak with Mitt before his death or read the letter he left behind. Hoping to obtain his father's remains for burial and find closure, Jay undertakes an unauthorized solo scuba dive to search for the body, carrying a tank with approximately one hour of air. Near the edge of a submarine canyon, Jay encounters a giant squid fighting a sperm whale. As he attempts to reach the surface, the squid entangles his diving equipment and the whale finally swallows both Jay and the squid.

Jay regains consciousness inside one of the whale's four stomach chambers. He fights the squid, which is subsequently crushed by the stomach's muscular contractions. While searching for an escape route, Jay enters an adjacent chamber, where digestive fluids begin damaging his skin and equipment, and the partially digested squid's beak stabs his hand. Jay returns to the first chamber, but his diminishing oxygen supply causes him to experience panic, delirium, and memories of his childhood.

Using the squid's beak and the faint illumination of a recently swallowed bioluminescent jellyfish, Jay attempts to climb through the whale's esophagus toward its mouth. When the whale surfaces to breathe, he tries to attract the attention of a nearby tour boat, which fails to notice him. The whale subsequently dives, and the rapid change in pressure causes Jay to suffer injuries and eventually lose consciousness. Upon regaining consciousness, Jay discovers that his oxygen supply is nearly depleted. Unable to find an exit, he attempts to force the whale to regurgitate him by stabbing its stomach wall with the squid's beak, but is unsuccessful. The whale is then attacked by a pod of orcas, before a nearby group of sperm whales intervenes and drives the orcas away. Jay's whale is mortally wounded and begins ascending toward the surface.

As his condition deteriorates, Jay experiences hallucinations involving his father. Recalling a survival lesson Mitt taught him during childhood, he concludes a means of escape. Using methane from the stomach chamber, oxygen from his remaining scuba supply, and steel wool and batteries carried as part of his diving equipment, Jay constructs an improvised explosive device. He uses the squid's beak to cut an opening in the stomach wall and positions the device inside it. The resulting explosion ruptures the whale's stomach and body, propelling Jay into the ocean. Jay reaches the surface as the whale's body sinks. A nearby tour boat rescues him and applies a tourniquet to his left arm. Later, Jay reunites with his family aboard Mitt's former boat. He finally reads the letter his father left for him and reacts emotionally, crying and laughing as he processes its contents.

== Cast ==
- Austin Abrams as Jay Gardiner, Mitt and Zara's son
- Josh Brolin as Mitt Gardiner, Jay's estranged father
- Elisabeth Shue as Zara Gardiner, Jay's mother
- John Ortiz as Hewey, Mitt's friend, a retired dentist
- Jane Levy as Eva Gardiner, Mitt and Zara's eldest daughter
- Emily Rudd as Nan Gardiner, Mitt and Zara's youngest daughter and middle child

== Production ==
=== Development ===
In August 2023, just before the book's publication, Imagine Entertainment announced that it had struck a pre-emptive film rights deal for Whalefall. In March 2024, 20th Century Studios won a bidding war for distribution for Daniel Kraus' novel and set Brian Duffield as director and co-writer. The following year, Austin Abrams was cast as the lead, with Josh Brolin entering negotiations to join. Brolin would be confirmed by June, with Elisabeth Shue, John Ortiz, Jane Levy, and Emily Rudd also added to the cast.

=== Filming ===
Production was granted a tax credit to film in California, with principal photography beginning in Los Angeles on June 9, 2025. Filming lasted 62 days, and a practical 12-foot-tall, 18-feet-wide whale was constructed for the shoot. The production received $10.4 million in tax credits off $48.7 million spent on-location. Aaron Morton serves as cinematographer, having previously collaborated with Duffield on No One Will Save You and Spontaneous. Scenes were shot at Monterey Peninsula on June 17. Producers debated shooting in Louisiana, where the tax incentives are slightly higher, but opted to film around Los Angeles to have the cast and crew able to remain close to their homes during filming.

=== Music ===
Joseph Trapanese composed the score for the film.

== Release ==
Whalefall premiered at Cineworld in Leicester Square, London on October 5, 2026, and it was theatrically released in the United States on October 16, by 20th Century Studios. It was also screened in Sitges Collection on October 14, 2026 at the 59th Sitges Film Festival, and in the Grand Public section of the 21st Rome Film Festival in October 2026.

== Reception ==
=== Box office ===
As of November 15, 2026, Whalefall has grossed $17.6 million in the United States and Canada, and $22 million in other territories, for a worldwide total of $39.7 million.

In the United States and Canada, Whalefall was released alongside Street Fighter, You Can See Everything, and Sense and Sensibility, and was projected to gross $10–12 million from 3,065 theaters in its opening weekend. The film made $3 million on its first day, including $900,000 from Thursday night previews. It went on to underperform, debuting to just $8 million and finishing in fourth.

=== Critical response ===
On the review aggregator website Rotten Tomatoes, 75% of 200 critics' reviews are positive, with an average rating of 6.5/10. The website's consensus reads: "Unforgettably visceral whenever it isn't getting mired in flashbacks, Whalefall's freaky concept requires suspension of disbelief that is rewarded with some of the most unusual set pieces the survival thriller genre has to offer." Metacritic, which uses a weighted average, assigned the film a score of 59 out of 100, based on 38 critics, indicating "mixed or average" reviews. Audiences polled by CinemaScore gave the film an average grade of "B" on an A+ to F scale.

Zachary Lee of RogerEbert.com gave Whalefall three and a half stars out of four, and praised it for its claustrophobic suspense, imaginative visual spectacle, and exploration of grief and spirituality. Lee highlighted Duffield's ability to combine a high-concept survival thriller with deeper existential themes, describing the film as a "mind-bending joyride" that takes audiences to "uncharted cinematic depths." Nikki Baughan of Screen Daily gave the film a positive review, praising Abrams' lead performance, the intense visuals, and the emotional depth underlying its unusual survival premise. Baughan noted that Abrams carries much of the film through its increasingly outlandish developments, while the story's emotional core elevates it beyond its high-concept premise. Phil de Semlyen of Time Out awarded the film four out of five stars, describing it as a fast-paced and effective underwater thriller. He praised Duffield's direction, the claustrophobic atmosphere, and the film's body-horror sequences, noting that the whale's interior provides a distinctive setting for a tense race against time. Financial Times praised the film's striking visual effects, imaginative depiction of the whale's interior, and Abrams' performance, but criticized the emotional storyline involving Jay's relationship with his deceased father as overly sentimental. Johnny Oleksinski, of the New York Post criticized the movie's inability to engage with the audience, but praised Abrams' performance.
