= Whalefall (novel) =

2023 novel by Daniel Kraus

- Book cover
- Author: Daniel Kraus
- Audio read by: Kirby Heyborne (Simon & Schuster Audio)
- Cover artist: Will Staehle
- Language: English
- Genre: Thriller
- Publisher: MTV Entertainment Books (US)
- Publication date: August 8, 2023
- Publication place: United States
- Media type: Print (hardcover); E-book; Audiobook
- Pages: 336
- ISBN: 9781665918169

Whalefall is a 2023 survival thriller novel by Daniel Kraus about a teenage scuba diver who is swallowed by a sperm whale. Its cover art is by Will Staehle.

== Plot summary ==
Jay Gardiner is a teenager living in the California Central Coast who is struggling over the recent death of his father, Mitt Gardiner. Mitt was a well-known figure in the local scuba diving community who worked a variety of jobs that drew on his diving and nautical skills. While he was well-liked by local divers, he had a strained relationship with Jay. After an incident in which Mitt gets drunk and pressures Jay to cut himself, Jay moves out and begins staying with friends. Not long after, Mitt is diagnosed with advanced mesothelioma. Despite pressure from his mother and sisters, Jay never visits his father to make amends. Mitt later kills himself by jumping off a boat off the coast of Monastery Beach near Monterey, California, while weighed down with diving weights. Feeling shame over his inability to live up to Mitt's expectations and guilt over his culpability in the suicide, Jay decides to scuba dive at Monastery Beach to retrieve his father's remains.

Partway through this dive, Jay encounters a giant squid, which is being attacked by a sperm whale. As the whale is attempting to eat the squid, Jay's diving gear gets caught on the squid, and he is swallowed. Jay, seriously injured, attempts a number of strategies to escape, including crawling deeper into the whale's digestive tract, using a squid beak to cut himself out of the whale's stomach, and climbing out of the stomach into the whale's throat using a jellyfish's bioluminescence to illuminate handholds. While navigating these physical challenges, Jay confronts what he perceives to be his role in Mitt's suicide. Throughout the ordeal, he communicates with the disembodied voice of his father, which seems to be connected to the whale, and the two make amends. Jay escapes by creating an explosion in the whale's stomach using steel wool and batteries and is rescued.

== Characters ==
- Jay Gardiner, a teenager from Monterey, California whose father taught him to scuba dive
- Mitt Gardiner, a gruff professional scuba diver and whale watching boat captain who resents his son's sensitive nature
- Hewey, Mitt's friend, a retired dentist
- Mom, Jay's mother
- Nan, one of Jay's two sisters
- Eva, one of Jay's two sisters

== Reception ==
Whalefall received generally positive reviews and was included in a list of the "Best Thrillers of 2023" by the New York Times. Sarah Lyall of the New York Times described the book as a "crazily enjoyable, beat-the-clock adventure story about fathers, sons, guilt and the mysteries of the sea," and compared the book to the survival film 127 Hours. Lyall also suggested that the psychological explorations of Jay's and Mitt's relationship can sometimes feel "a bit heavy-handed." A positive review in Paste suggested that the book plays with readers' expectations through its similarity to archetypal stories about people being swallowed by marine animals, such as the Biblical story of Jonah. NPR's Up First podcast described the book as a "page-turning thriller" and a "deep meditation on fathers, sons and loss." The novel won a 2024 Alex Award from YALSA. It was a finalist for the 2023 Los Angeles Times Book Prize in Science Fiction, Fantasy, and Speculative Fiction.

== Film adaptation ==
On August 1, 2023, just before the book's publication, Imagine Entertainment announced that it had struck a pre-emptive film rights deal. On March 7, 2024, it was reported that 20th Century Studios won a bidding war for the theatrical distribution rights to the adaptation, co-written by Kraus with director Brian Duffield.

On March 5, 2025, Austin Abrams was announced to star in the film, while on March 27, Josh Brolin was announced to co-star with Abrams. Elisabeth Shue, John Ortiz, Jane Levy, and Emily Rudd were announced to star on June 5. The film is scheduled to be released in the United States on October 16, 2026, by 20th Century Studios.

== See also ==
- Angel Down, 2025 novel also by Daniel Kraus
