= Daniel Kraus (author) =

American author (born 1975)

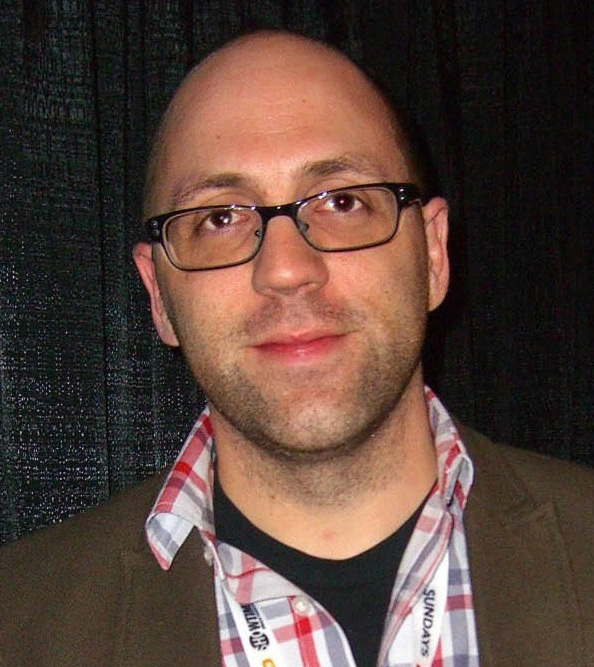
- Kraus in 2012
- Born: June 7, 1975 (age 51); Midland, Michigan, U.S.
- Education: University of Illinois, Urbana-Champaign
- Notable work: The Living Dead (2020); Whalefall (2023); Angel Down (2025)
- Awards: Bram Stoker Award (2022); Pulitzer Prize (2026)
- Website: danielkraus.com

Daniel Kraus (born June 7, 1975) is an American author known for his collaborations with George A. Romero and Guillermo del Toro. As of November 2025, he has published 22 novels, including The Living Dead (2020, co-authored with George A. Romero), Whalefall (2023), and Angel Down (2025). He has also authored three graphic novels and the nonfiction book Partially Devoured (2026).

In 2012, Kraus became the Booklist Books for Youth editor at the American book review magazine, Booklist.

Kraus was awarded the 2026 Pulitzer Prize for Fiction for his novel Angel Down.

== Selected books ==
=== The Monster Variations (2009) ===
Kraus's debut novel, The Monster Variations, was published with Delacorte Press on August 11, 2009. The New York Public Library included the novel on their list of "100 Best Stuff for Teens" in 2010.

=== Rotters (2011) ===
Kraus's second novel, Rotters, was published by Delacorte in on April 5, 2011. The novel was well received by critics. It won the Parents' Choice Award Gold Award, and was a finalist for a Bram Stoker Award. Booklist and The Bulletin of the Center for Children's Books named it among the year's best books. The audiobook narrated by American actor Kirby Heyborne won the 2012 Odyssey Award. The Young Adult Library Services Association (YALSA) included it on their list of Amazing Audiobooks for Young Adults.

=== Scowler (2013) ===
Scowler was published by Delacorte in March 2013. Booklist included the novel on their list of the year's "Top 10 Horror Fiction for Youth", and YALSA included on their list of the year's Best Fiction for Young Adults. The audiobook narrated by Kirby Heyborne was also well received. Booklist included it among their 2013 "Booklist Editors' Choice: Audio for Youth" and 2014 list of the "Top 10 SF, Fantasy, and Horror Audiobooks for Youth", and YALSA named it among their 2014 Amazing Audiobooks for Young Adults. It also won the 2014 Odyssey Award.

=== Trollhunters (2015) ===
Kraus co-authored Trollhunters with Mexican filmmaker Guillermo del Toro, publishing the novel with Disney/Hyperion in July 2015. The Association for Library Service to Children named the audiobook narrated by American actor Kirby Heyborne on their 2016 list of Notable Children's Recordings; YALSA also included it on their top ten list of Amazing Audiobooks for Young Adults.

The novel was adapted into the Netflix animated series of the same name.

=== Death and Life of Zebulon Finch (2015–16) ===
The Death and Life of Zebulon Finch duology, consists of At the Edge of Empire (2015) and Empire Decayed (2016). Entertainment Weekly included the first volume on their list of the best books of 2015.

=== Whalefall (2023) ===
Whalefall was published by MTV Entertainment Studios in August 2023. Booklist included the novel on their list of the year's "Top 10 SF/Fantasy & Horror", and Shelf Awareness named it among the ten best adult novels of the year. It also won a 2024 Alex Award from YALSA. Whalefall was a finalist for the 2023 Los Angeles Times Book Prize in Science Fiction, Fantasy, and Speculative Fiction.

The novel has been adapted into a film of the same name, directed by Brian Duffield, who co-wrote the screenplay with Kraus.

=== Angel Down (2025) ===
Angel Down was published by Atria in July 2025. The audiobook is narrated by American actor Kirby Heyborne. The New York Times included the novel on their list of the year's "100 Notable Books", and Booklist included it on their list of the year's "Top 10 SF/Fantasy & Horror". In December 2025, The New York Times named Angel Down one of the 10 Best Books of 2025.

In January 2026, a film adaptation was announced. It will be the second feature film adaptation of Kraus' to partner with Imagine Entertainment.

The novel was awarded the 2026 Pulitzer Prize for Fiction.

== Personal life ==
Kraus was born in Midland, Michigan, and grew up in Fairfield, Iowa. He lives in Chicago with his wife.

== Awards and honors ==
Three of Kraus's books are Junior Library Guild selections: Scowler (2013), The Shape of Water (2018), and Bent Heavens (2020).

Awards for Kraus's books
Year	Title	Award	Result	Ref.
2011	Rotters	Bram Stoker Award for Best Young Adult Novel	Nominee	
2012	Rotters	Odyssey Award	Winner	
2012	Rotters	Parents' Choice Award	Gold	
2014	Scowler	Odyssey Award	Winner	
2019	The Shape of Water	Scribe Award for Adapted Novel	Winner	
2020	Bent Heavens	Bram Stoker Award for Best Young Adult Novel	Nominee	
2022	They Stole Our Hearts	Bram Stoker Award for Superior Achievement in a Middle Grade Novel	Winner	
2023	Whalefall	Los Angeles Times Book Prize in Science Fiction, Fantasy, and Speculative Fiction	Finalist	
2024	Whalefall	Alex Awards	Winner	
2026	Angel Down	Pulitzer Prize for Fiction	Winner	

== Publications ==
=== Novels ===
==== Standalone ====
- Kraus, Daniel (2009). The Monster Variations. New York: Delacorte Press. ISBN 978-0-385-73733-3.
- Kraus, Daniel (2011). Rotters. New York: Delacorte Press. ISBN 978-0-385-73857-6.
- Kraus, Daniel (2013). Scowler. Westminster: Random House Children's Books. ISBN 978-0-385-74309-9.
- Kraus, Daniel (2019). Blood Sugar. London: Titan Books. ISBN 978-1-78909-193-9.
- Kraus, Daniel (2020). Bent Heavens. New York: Henry Holt and Company. ISBN 978-1-250-15167-4.
- Moalem, Sharon; Daniel Kraus (2022). Wrath. Union Square & Co. ISBN 978-1-4549-4522-2.
- Kraus, Daniel (2022). The Ghost That Ate Us: The Tragic True Story of the Burger City Poltergeist. Bowie: Raw Dog Screaming Press. ISBN 978-1-947879-55-3.
- Kraus, Daniel (2023). Whalefall. New York: MTV Entertainment Books. ISBN 978-1-6659-1816-9.
- Kraus, Daniel (2025). Angel Down. New York: Atria Books. ISBN 978-1-6680-6845-8.
- Kraus, Daniel (2026). The Sixth Nik. Saga. ISBN 978-1-6680-7947-8.

==== Death and Life of Zebulon Finch duology ====
- Kraus, Daniel (2016). The Death and Life of Zebulon Finch, Volume 1: At the Edge of Empire. New York: Simon & Schuster. ISBN 978-1-4814-1139-4.
- Kraus, Daniel (2016). The Death and Life of Zebulon Finch, Volume 2: Empire Decayed. New York: Simon & Schuster. ISBN 978-1-4814-1142-4.

==== Filmmaker collaborations ====
- Toro, Guillermo del; Kraus, Daniel (2015). Trollhunters. Los Angeles: Hyperion. ISBN 978-1-4231-2598-3.
- Toro, Guillermo del; Kraus, Daniel (2018). The Shape of Water. New York: Feiwel and Friends. ISBN 978-1-250-16534-3.
- Romero, George A.; Kraus, Daniel (2020). The Living Dead. New York: Tor. ISBN 978-1-250-30512-1.
- Romero, George A.; Kraus, Daniel (2024). Pay the Piper. New York: Union Square & Co. ISBN 978-1-454-95089-9.

==== The Graveyard Girls trilogy ====
The Graveyard Girls trilogy is co-authored by Canadian writer Lisi Harrison.

- Harrison, Lisi; Kraus, Daniel (2022). 1-2-3-4, I Declare a Thumb War. New York: Union Square Kids. ISBN 978-1-4549-4454-6.
- Harrison, Lisi; Kraus, Daniel (2023). Scream for the Camera. New York: Union Square Kids. ISBN 978-1-4549-4456-0.
- Harrison, Lisi; Kraus, Daniel (2024). Season's Eatings. New York: Union Square Kids. ISBN 978-1-4549-4458-4.

==== The Teddies Saga ====
The Teddies saga is illustrated by Australian artist Rovina Cai.

- Kraus, Daniel (2020). They Threw Us Away. Illustrated by Rovina Cai. New York: Henry Holt Books and Company. ISBN 978-1-250-22440-8.
- Kraus, Daniel (2021). They Stole Our Hearts. Illustrated by Rovina Cai. New York: Henry Holt Books and Company. ISBN 978-1-250-22442-2.
- Kraus, Daniel (2022). They Set the Fire. Illustrated by Rovina Cai. New York: Henry Holt Books and Company. ISBN 978-1-250-22444-6.

=== Graphic novels and comics ===
- Kraus, Daniel (2021). Wassel, Adrian F. (ed.). Autumnal: The Complete Series. Illustrated by Chris Shehan, lettered by Jim Campbell, and colored by Jason Wordie. Chicago: Vault Comics. ISBN 978-1-939424-79-2.
- Kraus, Daniel (2023). Year Zero Vol. 0. Illustrated by Goran Sudžuka. Artists, Writers & Artisans. ISBN 978-1-953-16545-9.
- Kraus, Daniel (2023). Trojan. Illustrated by Laci. Artists, Writers & Artisans. ISBN 978-1-953-16549-7.
- Kraus, Daniel (2024). Wassel, Adrian F. (ed.). The Cemeterians. Illustrated by Maan House, colored by Kurt Michel Russell, and lettered by Jim Campbell. Chicago: Vault Comics. ISBN 978-1-638-49205-4.
- Kraus, Daniel; Dani (2025). Athanasia. Vault. ISBN 978-1-63849-281-8.

=== Nonfiction ===
- Kraus, Daniel (2026). Partially Devoured: How Night of the Living Dead Saved My Life and Changed the World. San Francisco: Counterpoint. ISBN 978-1-64009-715-5.
